= Absolute Midnight =

2011 fantasy novel by Clive Barker

- First edition
- Author: Clive Barker
- Illustrator: Clive Barker
- Cover artist: Clive Barker
- Language: English
- Series: Abarat
- Genre: Fantasy; Young adult fiction
- Publisher: Joanna Cotler Books / HarperCollins
- Publication date: 27 September 2011
- Publication place: United States
- Media type: Print (hardcover)
- Pages: 592
- ISBN: 978-0-06-029171-6
- Preceded by: Days of Magic, Nights of War
- Followed by: Kry Rising

Absolute Midnight, also published as Abarat: Absolute Midnight, is a 2011 fantasy novel written and illustrated by British author Clive Barker. It is the third novel in Barker's Abarat series, following Abarat (2002) and Days of Magic, Nights of War (2004).

The novel continues the story of Candy Quackenbush, a teenager from Chickentown, Minnesota, whose connection to the fantastical archipelago of Abarat places her at the centre of a struggle between the forces of light and the armies of Mater Motley. As Motley attempts to plunge the islands into permanent darkness, Candy's allies and enemies are drawn into a large-scale conflict that threatens the survival of Abarat itself.

Like the previous books in the series, Absolute Midnight is extensively illustrated with paintings by Barker.

== Plot ==
After the events of Days of Magic, Nights of War, Candy Quackenbush visits the enchantress Laguna Munn to separate the soul of Princess Boa from her body. Once freed, Boa turns against Candy and later sets out in search of Christopher Carrion.

Candy briefly returns to the human world, where her father attempts to exploit her memories of Abarat. After returning to the archipelago, she reunites with her allies and gradually forms an uneasy connection with Christopher Carrion and his father, Zephario.

As Mater Motley consolidates her power, Candy becomes romantically involved with a boy named Gazza while Malingo remains devoted to her. The conflict escalates when Mater Motley releases the Sacbrood, darkening the skies over Abarat and creating the "absolute midnight" of the title. She also allies herself with the Nephauree, otherworldly beings intent on dominating or destroying the archipelago.

During the climactic battle, Candy uses a fragment of the Abarataraba, Abarat's supreme book of magic, to free prisoners held by Mater Motley. Christopher Carrion and Malingo prevent Motley from killing Candy, while Carrion's imprisoned siblings are released.

Candy, Malingo and Gazza are ultimately cast beyond the boundaries of Abarat into another world, leaving their fate unresolved.

== Background and publication ==
Absolute Midnight was published by Joanna Cotler Books, an imprint of HarperCollins, on 27 September 2011. The American hardcover edition was listed at 592 pages and carried the ISBN 978-0-06-029171-6.

The book arrived seven years after Days of Magic, Nights of War. It continued Barker's practice of integrating his own paintings directly into the narrative and visual design of the Abarat books.

Contemporary descriptions marketed the novel as the third instalment in Barker's planned multi-volume Abarat sequence. Bibliographic listings have varied over time in describing the intended total number of volumes, so it is safer to identify Absolute Midnight simply as the third published novel in the series.

== Critical reception ==
Gina McIntyre of the Los Angeles Times praised Candy Quackenbush as a strong contemporary fantasy heroine, comparing her literary role to characters such as Dorothy and Alice while emphasizing her resourcefulness, bravery and willingness to sacrifice herself for others.

McIntyre also described the novel as significantly darker than its predecessors, with a large-scale war at its centre and Mater Motley serving as the dominant villain. The review praised Barker's detailed creation of creatures, landscapes and supernatural settings, arguing that the world of Abarat remained one of the book's strongest elements.

Kirkus Reviews offered a more mixed assessment. It praised Barker's illustrations and acknowledged moments of genuine horror, but criticised the characterisation of Candy and Mater Motley as comparatively thin and found some of the romantic and comic dialogue unconvincing. The review also noted that Barker's elaborate prose and visual imagination remained central strengths of the series.

The Los Angeles Times later included the book in its 2011 holiday recommendations for children and young adults, describing it as the third instalment in a lavish fantasy series for readers aged 13 and older.
