= Kim Mai Guest =

American television and voice actress (born 1969)

- Born: Kim Mai Angela Guest; 5 August 1969 (age 56); Indianapolis, Indiana, U.S.
- Other names: Kim Guest, Kim Mai Nguyen, Kim Nguyen, Therese Nguyen
- Occupations: Television and voice actress
- Years active: 1991–present
- Notable credit(s): .hack//SIGN as Subaru; Dirge of Cerberus -Final Fantasy VII- as Shalua Rui; Metal Gear Solid as Mei Ling; Tales of Symphonia as Martel/Tabatha; Jade Empire as Dawn Star
- Children: 1
- Website: http://www.kimmai.com/

Kim Mai Guest is an American television and voice actress. She is well known for her role as Mei Ling in Metal Gear series.

== Early life ==
She was born in Indianapolis, Indiana, U.S. She was interested in acting from childhood and took part in school plays after she went to college, where she worked in theatre plays.

== Career ==
After graduating from college, she moved to Los Angeles, where she joined a children's theatre group. She later took a voice acting class with Kris Zimmerman, who hired her for Metal Gear Solid to voice the character Mei Ling. She learned a Chinese accent for the role in just three days.

== Personal life ==
She lives in Los Angeles and she has a daughter.

== Filmography ==
=== Television series ===
Year	Title	Role	Notes
1998	One World	Kendra	Episode: "Crushes, Lies & Zuckerman"

=== Animation ===
List of voice performances in animation
Year	Title	Role(s)	Notes	Source
2002–2004	Rocket Power	Noelani, Pinkie Pixie, Kid, Girl, Shoobie, Crackling voice, various voices	5 episodes	
2003	Justice League	Katma Tui, Landlady	Episode: "Hearts and Minds"	
2003	Rugrats	Girls, Toddler 2, Braniac Girl	2 episodes	
2004-2006	Hi Hi Puffy AmiYumi	Ms. Patience, Granny, Myrna, Salesperson, Woman, Clerk	3 episodes	
2005	All Grown Up!	Seymour, Joni	Episode: "Yu-Gotta-Go"	
2005	Danger Rangers	Angela, Girl	Episode: "Where the Fun Never Stops"	
2005-2006	Justice League Unlimited	Silver Banshee, Linda Park, Supergirl fan, Earleen, Hologram Girl, Little Girl, Siobhan McDougal, Jennifer Morgan	2 episodes	
2005-2006	Codename: Kids Next Door	Numbuh 10, Numbuh 888	2 episodes	
2006	Avatar: The Last Airbender	Song, Ying	2 episodes	
2006	Ben 10	Pinky, Andy, Kid 1, Elsgood, Grand Kid, Kid	3 episodes	
2006	Holly Hobbie & Friends: Best Friends Forever	Devon	Episode: "Best Friends Forever"	
2008	Ben 10: Alien Force	Lucy, Zombie Girls	Episode: "All That Glitters"	
2009	Batman: The Brave and the Bold	Katana	Episode: "Inside the Outsiders!"	
2010–2011	G.I. Joe: Renegades	Jinx, Kimi Arashikage, Young Jinx	3 episodes	
2012	Randy Cunningham: 9th Grade Ninja	Costume children, Additional voices	2 episodes	
2023	What If...?	Additional voices	Episode: "What If... Captain Carter Fought the Hydra Stomper?"	

=== Anime series ===
List of English dubbing performances in animation
Year	Title	Role	Notes	Source
1997–1998	Battle Athletes	Announcer	English version	
1997-1998	Battle Athletes Victory	Ladies, Girls, Additional voices	English version	
1999	Fist of the North Star	Airi, Tamira, Girl with Knife, Madara's Victim C, Sacrificed Villager D	5 episodes	
1999	Black Heaven	Additional voices	Credited as Kim Nguyen	
2000	Gate Keepers	Teacher, Student	Credited as Kim Mai Nguyen	
2001	Geneshaft	Fumi	Episode: "Hoshi Wo Tsugu Mono"	
2002	.hack//Liminality	Narumi	Credited as Kim Guest	
2002	.hack//SIGN	Subaru	25 episodes	
2002-2003	The Twelve Kingdoms	Nyosen	Credited as Therese Nguyen	
2003	Gad Guard	Melissa, Sayuri	Credited as Therese Nguyen	
2003	.hack//Unison	Subaru	English version	
2003	Submarine 707	Ayumi Hayami	Credited as Therese Nguyen	
2003	Scrapped Princess	Audrey	Episode: "Serenade of the Fake Princess"	
2003	Please Twins!	Haruko Shidou	Credited as Therese Nguyen	
2003	Saiyuki Reload	Yunfa	Credited as Therese Nguyen	
2004	Witch Hunter Robin	Minori Nakayama	English version	
2004	Heat Guy J	Mauro's granddaughter	Credited as Therese Nguyen	
2004	Last Exile	Holly Mad-thane	Episode: "First Move"	
2004	Hanaukyo Maid Team	Ichigo, Sango and Ringo	Credited as Therese Nguyen	
2005	Ghost in the Shell: Stand Alone Complex	Nurse	English version	
2006	Black Jack	Mariko	Episode: "The Carbuncle with a Human Face"	
2008	Code Geass	Nina Einstein, Sayoko Shinozaki		
2011	Marvel Anime: Blade	Makoto, Stan Davis's wife		
2024	Code Geass: Rozé of the Recapture	Nina Einstein	English version	

=== Film ===
List of voice performances in direct-to-video and films
Year	Title	Role	Notes	Source
1991	Where the Night Begins	Sybil		
1999	Street Fighter Alpha: The Animation	Rose		
2000	Mirror Mirror 4: Reflections	Annika		
2001	Ticker	Therese Nguyen		
2003	The Wacky Adventures of Ronald McDonald: The Monster O' McDonaldland Loch	Kids		
2003	Asterix and the Vikings	Additional voices		
2006	Choose Your Own Adventure: The Abominable Snowman	Old Woman		
2006	Hellboy: Sword of Storms	Additional voices		
2006	Holly Hobbie and Friends: Christmas Wishes	Devon		
2006	Holly Hobbie & Friends: Secret Adventures	Devon		
2007	Chill Out, Scooby-Doo!	Minga Sherpa		
2007	Holly Hobbie and Friends: Surprise Party	Devon		
2007	Holly Hobbie & Friends: Best Friends Forever	Devon		
2008	Metal Gear Solid: Digital Graphic Novel	Mei Ling	English version	
2008	Metal Gear Solid 2: Bande Dessinee	Karen Hojo	English version	
2010	The Legend of Secret Pass	Qui Qui		
2011	Dead Space: Aftermath	Lana		
2019	Code Geass: Lelouch of the Re;surrection	Sayoko Shinozaki, Nina Einstein		
2020	Kung Fu Mulan	Mulan		
2021	Words Bubble Up Like Soda Pop	Tsubasa Fujiyama		
2021	New Gods: Nezha Reborn	Ms. San		
2022	Turning Red	Additional voices		

=== Podcast series ===
List of voice performances in podcast
Year	Title	Role(s)	Notes
2018	Fresh Ink an Anthology	Narrator	Audio book
2019	Aurora Rising	Auri	Audio book
2020	Aurora Burning	Auri	series
2021	Aurora's End	Auri	series

=== Video games ===
List of voice performances in video games
Year	Title	Role	Notes
1998	Metal Gear Solid	Mei-Ling	PlayStation / PC
1999	Metal Gear Solid: Integral	Mei-Ling	PC
1999	Metal Gear Solid: VR Missions	Mei-Ling	PlayStation Vita
1999	Barbie Super Sports	Announcer, Teresa, Christie	PlayStation
2000	Grandia II	Tio, High Priestess Selene, Client's Daughter	PlayStation 2
2001	Maximo: Ghosts to Glory	Sophia, Queen, Aurora Lee	PlayStation 2
2001	Throne of Darkness	Ninja / Additional voices	PC
2001	JumpStart SpyMasters: Unmask the Prankster	Sally	PC
2001	Metal Gear Solid 2: Sons of Liberty	Mei Ling	Xbox 360
2002	Dark Chronicle	Lin	PlayStation 2
2002	Eternal Darkness: Sanity's Requiem	Ellia the Dancer, Xel'lotath	PC
2002	.hack//Outbreak	Subaru	PlayStation 2
2002	Metal Gear Solid 2: Substance	Mei Ling	PlayStation 2
2002	.hack//Mutation	Subaru	PlayStation 2
2002	EOE: Eve of Extinction	Zera	PlayStation 2
2003	Fatal Frame II: Crimson Butterfly	Mayu Amakura / Sae Kurosawa / Chitose Tachibana	PlayStation 2
2003	Command & Conquer: Generals	Black Lotus	PC
2003	Everybody's Golf 4	Misaki / Sakaru / Lin	PlayStation 2
2003	Tales of Symphonia	Martel, Tabatha	GameCube
2003	.hack//Quarantine	Subaru	PlayStation 2
2003	Ratchet & Clank: Going Commando	Trailer PA	PlayStation 2
2003	Ghosthunter	Redneck Girl, Ghost Girl	PlayStation 2
2003	Lineage II	Human Mage	PC
2003	Gladius	Ejii, Kareema	PlayStation 2
2003	Command & Conquer: Generals – Zero Hour	Black Lotus	PC
2004	Metal Gear Solid: The Twin Snakes	Mei Ling	GameCube
2004	Syphon Filter: The Omega Strain	Lian Xing	PlayStation 2
2004	Xenosaga Episode II	Juli Mizrahi, Nephilim, Newscaster, Announcer	PlayStation 2
2004	X-Men Legends II: Rise of Apocalypse	Lady Deathstrike, Shadowcat	Xbox
2004	Galleon	Mihoko	Xbox
2004	Shark Tale	Additional Tenant Fish	PlayStation 2
2004	Shellshock: Nam '67	Hookers #3, Vietnamese Soldiers, Prisoners, Civilians #1	PlayStation 2
2004	Gurumin	Pino, Chucky, Pamela	PC
2004	World of Warcraft	Additional voices	Mac OS X
2004	EverQuest II	Rachele Clothspinner, Armsdealer Shiba, Jezranaz Rottingskin, Chrna, Bizrihn Clamorclang, Merch. Qwergo Togglesmeet	PC
2004	The Lord of the Rings: The Battle for Middle-earth	Eowyn	PC
2005	Kingdom of Paradise	Sui Lin	PlayStation Portable
2005	Predator: Concrete Jungle	Additional voices	PlayStation 2
2005	Rise of the Kasai	Tati	PlayStation 2
2005	Fatal Frame III: The Tormented	Miku Hinasaki	PlayStation 2
2005	Jade Empire	Dawn Star, Additional voices	Xbox
2005	Warhawk	Commander Shayla Jassic	PlayStation
2005	Twisted Metal: Head-On	Angel, Jamie Roberts	PlayStation 2
2005	Perfect Dark Zero	Mai Hem	Xbox 360
2005	Yakuza	Civilians, Club Girls	PlayStation 3
2005	SOCOM 3 U.S. Navy SEALs	Marcy Raines	PlayStation 2
2005	Dungeons & Dragons: Dragonshard	Champions / Wizards / Rogues	PC
2005	Scooby-Doo! Unmasked	Nikki Starlight, Maggie Xi, Kung-Fu Maiden, Fire-Breathing Groupie	PlayStation 2
2006	Syphon Filter: Dark Mirror	Lian Xing	PlayStation Portable
2006	Xenosaga Episode III	Juli Mizrahi, Nephilim	English version
2006	X-Men: The Official Game	Kitty Pryde, Shadowcat	Xbox 360
2006	The Lord of the Rings: The Battle for Middle-earth II	Eowyn of Rohan	Xbox 360
2006	Marvel: Ultimate Alliance	Crystal, Psylocke	PlayStation 3
2006	Dirge of Cerberus: Final Fantasy VII	Shalua Rui	PlayStation 2
2006	Baten Kaitos Origins	Pieda	PC
2006	Red Steel	Additional voices	Wii
2006	Need for Speed: Carbon	Yumi	PlayStation 3
2006	Titan Quest	Worshippers, Civilians	PC
2006	Dead Rising	Isabela Keyes, Additional voices	Xbox 360
2006	The Lord of the Rings: The Battle for Middle-earth II: The Rise of the Witch-king	Eowyn	Xbox 360
2007	Power Rangers: Super Legends	Mighty Morphin Pink Ranger, Trakeena, Blue Wild Ranger	Nintendo DS
2007	Empire Earth III	Additional voices	PC
2007	Syphon Filter: Logan's Shadow	Lian Xing	PlayStation 2
2007	Spider-Man 3	Additional voices	PlayStation 3
2007	Lost Odyssey	Sarah Sisulart	Xbox 360
2007	TMNT	Additional voices	Nintendo DS
2007	No More Heroes	Holly Summers	Wii
2007	Titan Quest: Immortal Throne	Worshippers, Ladies	PC
2007	Mass Effect	Hana Murakami, Maeko Matsuo	Xbox 360
2008	Metal Gear Solid 4: Guns of the Patriots	Mei Ling, Body of Armor, Satisfied Customer A	English version
2008	Tom Clancy's EndWar	Announcer, Additional voices	PlayStation Portable
2008	Aion	Wizards	PC
2008	Metal Gear Online	Mei Ling	PlayStation 3
2008	Tom Clancy's EndWar	Computer voice, Announcer	Nintendo DS
2008	Super Smash Bros. Brawl	Mei Ling	Wii
2009	The Lord of the Rings: Conquest	Eowyn, Young Female Hobbit, Old Female Hobbit	Xbox 360
2009	Halo Wars	Professor Ellen Anders, Panicked Mob	Xbox 360
2009	Infamous	Female Pedestrian	PlayStation 3
2009	Wet	Tarantula, Opera Singer	Xbox 360
2009	Ninja Blade	Female High School Student	Xbox 360
2009	Naruto Shippuden: Ultimate Ninja Heroes 3	Tsukino	PlayStation Portable
2009	Final Fantasy XIII	Cocoon Inhabitants	Xbox 360
2009	Dragon Age: Origins	The Warden, Wise Dwarf Female	Xbox 360
2010	Tom Clancy's H.A.W.X 2	Additional voices	PlayStation 3
2010	Dragon Age: Origins – Awakening	The Warden, Wise Dwarf Female	Xbox 360
2011	Final Fantasy XIII-2	Alyssa Zaidelle	Xbox 360
2011	F.E.A.R. 3	Jin Sun-kwon	PlayStation 3
2011	Driver: San Francisco	Driver, Girls, Ladies, Announcer	Xbox 360
2011	Dead Island	Xian Mei	Xbox 360
2011	Saints Row: The Third	Pedestrian, Character voices	Xbox 360
2011	The Lord of the Rings: War in the North	Silanna	PlayStation 3 / Xbox 360
2012	Project Zero 2: Wii Edition	Mayu Amakura	Wii
2012	Diablo III	Additional voices	Xbox 360
2012	Dead Island: Ryder White	Xian Mei	Xbox 360
2012	Anarchy Reigns	Sasha Ivanoff, Jeannie Caxton, Announcer	PlayStation 3
2013	Saints Row IV	The Voices of Virtual Steelport, Additional voices	PlayStation 4
2013	Lightning Returns: Final Fantasy XIII	Woman in Love, Additional voices	PlayStation 3
2013	Dead Island: Riptide	Xian Mei	Xbox 360
2014	Hearthstone	Wizards, Witches, Additional voices	macOS
2014	Diablo III: Reaper of Souls	Additional voices	PlayStation 4
2015	Heroes of the Storm	Li Li Stormstout	macOS
2015	Final Fantasy Type-0 HD	Celestia	Xbox One
2016	World of Warcraft: Legion	LiLi Stormstout, Thisalee Crow	OS X / PC
2018	Super Smash Bros. Ultimate	Mei Ling	Nintendo Switch
2020	Final Fantasy VII Remake	Additional voices	PlayStation 5
2020	Ghost of Tsushima	Additional characters	PlayStation 5
2021	Mass Effect Legendary Edition	Hana Murakami, Captain Maeko Matsuo	PlayStation 4
2022	Ghostwire: Tokyo	Woman A, Woman C	Xbox Series X/S / PlayStation 5
2023	Diablo IV	Additional voices	PlayStation 4
2024	Like a Dragon: Infinite Wealth	Additional voices	PlayStation 5
2024	World of Warcraft: The War Within	Thisalee Crow	macOS
2025	Metal Gear Solid Delta: Snake Eater	Mei Ling	PlayStation 5

== Audiobooks ==
- God Gave Us You by Lisa T. Bergren
- Anna and the French Kiss by Stephanie Perkins
- Their Fractured Light by Amie Kaufman & Meagan Spooner
- One of Us Is Lying by Karen M. McManus
- Flamecaster by Cinda Williams Chima
- Shadowcaster by Cinda Williams Chima
- Stormcaster by Cinda Williams Chima
- Deathcaster by Cinda Williams Chima
- Dragon Pearl by Yoon Ha Lee
- Wait for Me by An Na
- Each Little Bird that Sings by Deborah Wiles
- Starry River of the Sky by Grace Lin
- Brutal by Michael Harmon
- Incarceron by Catherine Fisher
- Song of the Crimson Flower by Julie C. Dao
- Two Nights by Kathy Reichs
- The year of the dog by Grace Lin
- Sour Heart by Jenny Zhang
- Orphan Island by Laurel Snyder
- Born to Fly: The First Women's Air Race Across America by Steve Sheinkin
- What's Left Of Me by Kat Zhang
- Once We Were by Kat Zhang
- Steel Crow Saga by Paul Krueger
- Last Night I Dreamed of Peace: The Diary of Dang Thuy Tram by Đặng Thùy Trâm
