= Characters of Xenosaga =

The following is a list of Xenosaga characters.

== Development ==
After Xenosaga I, the character models were redesigned for Xenosaga II. MOMO's and Jr.'s designs became "...taller, slimmer and less child-like", which made MOMO appear slightly older. Shion lost her glasses and had a different outfit, while KOS-MOS gained blue highlights in her hair. When the first two episodes of Xenosaga were remade in Xenosaga I+II for the Nintendo DS, they were altered to two-dimensional computer graphics with sprites and visual novel-style dialogue sequences.

== Playable characters ==
=== Ziggy ===
Voiced by (English): Richard Epcar (Episodes II & III)
Voiced by (Japanese): Masashi Ebara

As revealed in Xenosaga: Pied Piper, which takes place in T.C. 4667, 100 years prior to the events of Xenosaga Episode I, Jan Sauer was a Captain in the 1875th Special Operations detachment of the Federation Police Bureau. He and his squad were deployed to the planet Abraxas to investigate murders in the U.M.N network committed by an individual known as "Voyager".

During their investigations, he met the widow Sharon Rozas, with whom he fell in love and later married, and her son Joaquin, and learned that Yuriev was providing funding for Voyager's murders. Soon after, Dimitri used his connections within the government to remove Sauer and his team from the investigation, but he continued his investigation even after he and some of his subordinates were arrested.

Following the death of his subordinate Mikhail Ortmann, Sauer discovered that Erich Weber, a member of his team, was Voyager. Erich explained to him his connection with U-DO before he transformed into the Black Testament and killed Sharon and Joaquin before giving him an ultimatum: either he killed him and consumed his soul, or he joined him as a Testament to live forever. However, Sauer refused either option and committed suicide, being reactivated two years later as the cyborg Ziggurat 8. Though he is implied to understand some of the events surrounding the Zohar, his past is generally not explored, except for in Xenosaga I+II, where he reveals more of his past to the party.

In Episode I, the S.O.C.E. sends him to infiltrate a U-TIC organization base and rescue M.O.M.O., who gives him the name Ziggy, and he becomes a father figure to her. After escaping on a spacecraft, the Elsa saves them from being destroyed by the U.M.N. column walls and they meet with the party, with him joining as a support party member. In Cathedral Ship, when Cherenkov diffuses into the Zohar emulator and begins his transformation into a Gnosis, Ziggy states that it is "the same, just like that day.", as Voyager transformed into the Black Testament through the same method. Following the destruction of Proto Merkabah, he helps rescue KOS-MOS after Shion loses hold of her.

In Episode II, Ziggy continues to protect M.O.M.O., even beyond his assigned mission, and bonds with Juli Mizrahi after revealing to her that he committed suicide because of Joaquin's death, as the loss of their children caused painful memories for them. She also asks him to consider life extension, which he does for M.O.M.O.'s sake. However, despite her sympathy for him, most employees of the U.M.N. Control Center regard him as old property. Within Labyrinthos, he sacrifices his cybernetic arm by breaking through a wall to help the party escape from the Ω System. At the end of Episode II, he is to be stationed at the Kukai Foundation and remain on call as a bodyguard for M.O.M.O.

=== M.O.M.O. ===
Voiced by (English): Sherry Lynn (Episode I), Christina Puccelli (Episodes II & III)
Voiced by (Japanese): Rumi Shishido

MOMO Mizrahi (M.O.M.O. being an acronym for Multiple Observative Mimetic Organicus) is a Realian, a class of artificial humans. Specifically, she is a prototype 100-series Observational Realian who Joachim Mizrahi and Juli Mizrahi created using genetic engineering to combat the Gnosis and resurrect U-DO. They created her in the likeness of their deceased daughter, Sakura, and with the appearance and personality of a twelve-year-old girl, and she does not show signs of aging. Despite being capable of thought and emotion, she and Juli had a strained relationship, as she saw her as a reminder of Sakura and nothing more than an artificial human. After Joachim's death, MOMO was rescued from her birthplace during the Miltian Conflict and sent to live with Juli on the planet Fifth Jerusalem, the hub of the Galaxy Federation. She is motivated by a desire to fulfill Joachim's wishes and gain Juli's approval as something more than a replacement for Sakura.

She wields short magical rods in Episode I and an Ether-based composite bow in Episodes II and III. When wielding the rods, she can fight at close range or from a distance by physically attacking enemies or shooting laser beams. When wielding the bow, all of her attacks are long-range. Among her Ether skills is the ability to transform into a more powerful version of herself through a transformation sequence. The costume she wears determines the ether-based abilities she can access for a duration. In Episode III, she gains the ability to immobilize enemies by filling up their "Break meter".

In Episode I, S.O.C.E and Juli assign Ziggy to rescue MOMO from the U-TIC Organization and protect her until her safe return. Throughout the series, she is central to the story because she contains the Y-Data. This makes her the target of kidnappings by Albedo and U-TIC and causes U.M.N. to manipulate her and her friends in order to obtain the Data. When Albedo attempts to extract the Y-Data from her body, which nearly kills her, she attempts to stop him by destroying her mind, but he obtains it after threatening Jr., after which she asks Juli for permission to assist in the investigation of Old Miltia. Following the events at Michtam, MOMO begins working with everyone to rebuild the world, believing that a new network will help to reunite those who have died.

=== chaos ===
Voiced by (English): Joshua Seth (Episodes II & III)
Voiced by (Japanese): Hoshi Soichiro

chaos (ケイオス, keiosu), also known as Yeshua, joined the crew of the Elsa two years prior to the events of Episode I, tasked with ensuring the safety of the crew during their travels and assisting in tasks such as in-flight functions and transporting cargo. chaos appears to be unaffected by physical aging, as he has the same physical appearance during the main story of Xenosaga as well as during the time of the Miltian Conflict, when he served under the Galaxy Federation fourteen years ago, and in Pied Piper, which takes place one hundred years earlier.

6,000 years ago, when he was known as Yeshua, he was one of the disciples of a man whom Ormus would come to worship as their Lord and Messiah and helped to teach humanity and perform miracles in his place. According to Wilheim and the database, chaos died physically during this time, leaving behind the "Word of Yeshua", also known as Lemegeton, with the Song of Nephilim being an incomplete translation of it. Lemegeton is a wavelength energy that is represented in the material world as words that can only be understood and spoken by chaos (Anima), and. when recited, allows them to access and control the Zohar and access energy from the Higher Domain of U-DO. Although humans are unable to speak these "words", ancient people and future researchers, such as Grimoire Verum, created programs from Lemegeton to control the Zohar. These programs were used in the Relics of God that harnessed the Zohar's energy, such as Zarathustra and Omega. People of the Zohar, whose wills resonated strongly with Anima due to their bloodline, could also control the Zohar, with the strongest being able to communicate with U-DO.

Episode III reveals that chaos is the human incarnation of Anima, a power derived from humanity's collective unconscious that has been present since the beginning of the universe, when certain wills of humanity resonated purely with Anima; according to the database, these were past incarnations of consciousnesses capable of becoming Testaments, including the party members. These wills set off a chain reaction throughout the collective consciousness, resulting in the dispersal of consciousnesses that rejected the collective consciousness and became Gnosis in the real world. Eventually, the dispersal of the collective consciousness would cause the universe to collapse.

To counter this, Anima possessed a failsafe function that would cause the imaginary number domain to collapse if the Gnosis exceeded critical mass, which in turn would cause the collapse of the universe as well as the real number domain and the upper domain. To save chaos' life and prevent destruction, Mary used her power of Animus to seal away the power of Anima into the twelve Anima Vessels by separating his soul into the Anima power, which was divided into the twelve Anima Vessels, and the Will of Anima, which is the failsafe. When separated from his Anima power, chaos' failsafe ability could not activate. However, as long as Anima existed, the consciousnesses would continue to disperse. To prevent this and the destruction of wills, Wilhelm chose eternal recurrence, using Zarathustra to rewind time in an eternal cycle that caused people to live the same lives repeatedly.

At the end of Episode III, chaos rejects the eternal recurrence and trusts the wills of humanity to change the future. Realizing that his power can be used to save the universe with the help of human wills who wish for it, he instructs Shion and her friends to lead humanity back to Lost Jerusalem, which holds the key to saving the universe. After the awakened KOS-MOS restores his power, chaos believes that he will disappear after releasing his power to slow the destruction of the universe and give humanity more time to find Lost Jerusalem. However, his consciousness lives on, as the consciousnesses of the universe desire his existence. After saving the Elsa by holding open an U.M.N. gate to allow them to escape the shockwave of the dimensional shift, he is last seen speaking to KOS-MOS as she drifts through space.

=== Gaignun Kukai Jr. (Rubedo) ===
Voiced by (English): Brianne Siddall (Episodes II & III)
Voiced by (Japanese): Eriko Kawasaki

U.R.T.V. #666 and the leader of the U.R.T.V.'s, Jr., also known as Rubedo, was a survivor of the U.R.T.V. (U-DO Retro Virus) unit that the scientist Dr. Yuriev created to combat U-DO, a mysterious waveform that threatened to destroy the galaxy. He and his twin brother, Albedo, U.R.T.V. #667, were born conjoined twins, with Albedo being attached to him through the heart until they were separated; Gaignun Kukai was the last brother, known as Nigredo. He possesses the unique abilities of the U.R.T.V.'s, including telepathy and telekinetic powers, and is said to have the perfect anti-U-DO wavelength, which is generated when in his "Red Dragon" mode.

Along with Albedo, Nigredo, and Citrine, Jr. is one of the "variants," U.R.T.V.'s who undergo a stimulated mutation, which caused his hair to turn bright red and his eyes to turn deep blue. It also gave him the ability to pause his cellular development and the power of the "Red Dragon" mode, which allows him to amplify the anti-U-DO waves emitted by himself and Standard U.R.T.V.'s, increasing his power but also risking causing him to go berserk. He has a tattoo of a red Chinese dragon on his left upper arm, which symbolizes this mode; as a result of subconsciously suppressing it, his aging is also suppressed. Despite his youthful appearance and impulsiveness, his maturity allows him to make tough decisions and cutting observations. He also has a fondness for guns, action movies, and classic novels, such as The Adventures of Robinson Crusoe, The Wonderful Wizard of Oz, and Twenty Thousand Leagues Under the Seas. Because of his hobbies, Jr. is a master of gunplay, especially with pistols, and enjoys fighting akimbo. He wields dual Rook Company pistols at the beginning of Episode I, and dual antique Makalov pistols in Episode II.

During the Miltian Conflict, Jr. and the other U.R.T.V.'s fought against U-DO before the planet disappeared into the Abyss. As leader of the U.R.T.V.'s, Jr. was responsible for keeping them connected through a spiritual link that protected them from U-DO's destructive powers. Before the U.R.T.V.'s could destroy U-DO, Jr. had a vision of the Old Miltian planet being destroyed as a monster emerged from within. Jr., fearing for the lives of his companions, broke the Spiritual Link, allowing U-DO to kill or drive mad the standard U.R.T.V.'s before Canaan and chaos rescued Jr. and Nigredo on the E.S. Asher. They were the only documented surviving U.R.T.V.'s, though Albedo and Citrine also survived.

Over the course of Episode I and Episode II, Jr. and M.O.M.O. bond due to Jr.'s past with Sakura Mizrahi, whom MOMO was modeled after, as when they were children, he promised Sakura that he would protect her mother and "little sister".

In Episode III, Jr. comes to terms with issues surrounding the remains of his "family"; his brothers Albedo and Gaignun, his sister Citrine and his father Yuriev. After the party confronts Dr. Sellers on the Tactical Warship Merkabah, he reveals that Yuriev is alive due to inhabiting the body of his "son", Nigredo. The party heads to the Durandal to confront Yuriev, where they discover that its crew, except for Mary and Shelly Godwin and the cruisers' guests, Juli Mizrahi and Canaan, were murdered by Yuriev soldiers, and are confronted by U.R.T.V. #668, Citrine.

Jr. tries to convince Citrine that what she and Yuriev are doing is wrong, but her dedication to her father's ideals has caused her to be willing to fight her own "brother" and die if need be, and dies after being defeated by the party. In the Isolation Area, Jr. confronts Yuriev as he removes the Zohar Emulators from their containment units and reveals his plan to conquer his fear of God (U-DO) by ascending to the realm of the gods and killing him. Before the party can stop him, the Durandal's engines activate and it leaves on a collision course with Abel's Ark as Yuriev disappears into the inner recesses of Isolation Area and the party flees before the ship is absorbed by the Ark.

In Abel's Ark, Jr. defeats Yuriev and Ω Res Novae/Ω Metempyschosis when Albedo, as the White Testament, arrives and takes the Zohar and Abel away from Yuriev before confronting Jr. While he orders Jr. to link with him and use their anti-U-DO waves to destroy Yuriev, Gaignun's consciousness emerges from Yuriev's and tells Jr. that it was Albedo's plan to transfer Gaignun's consciousness into Jr.'s body, but Gaignun instead took over Albedo's body and transferred Albedo's consciousness into Jr. Gaignun shifts himself and Yuriev into a higher dimension and Jr. and Albedo merge back into a single person. From there, he follows the party to Michtam to stop Zarathustra and Wilhelm and accompanies Shion and Allen to find Lost Jerusalem.

Jr.'s adult form was meant to appear in Episode II. In the original script written by Soraya Saga, partway through the game Jr. would unpause his growth and age to adulthood. His adult self would be a playable character and be part of several key sequences in the later sections of the game, such as a reunion with U.R.T.V. #668 Citrine and a three-way battle between KOS-MOS, U-DO, and him and Albedo. While cut from the script, the concept was reused in Episode III as a representation of Jr.'s true self.

=== Jin Uzuki ===
Voiced by (English): Michael Gough (Episodes II & III)
Voiced by (Japanese): Hideyuki Tanaka

Shion's brother, who, during the Miltian Conflict, stole information from Margulis about the true nature of the Miltian Conflict—the Y-Data. After joining chaos and Canaan in their search for the U.R.T.V.s, Margulis challenged Jin to a duel which ended in him receiving a gash over his right eye that left a permanent scar.

While in the military, he was ranked under Margulis and was Pellegri's superior. Both Jin and Margulis trained under his grandfather, the swordmaster Ouga Uzuki, who also taught Shion martial arts abilities. After learning of Margulis' treachery during the Miltian Conflict, Jin received information from his father Suou and secret intelligence activities under General Helmer, who was then a lieutenant, and became acquainted with chaos. While he was close to Pellegri during his time in the military, they took different paths in life due to differences in their relative stations.

At the end of Episode III, Jin is killed by the Armaros Gnosis while defending chaos and Nephilim within Zarathustra, though his spirit—his consciousness—travels with Nephilim to Lost Jerusalem (Earth).

=== Canaan ===
Voiced by (English): Beng Spies (Episode II); Steve Blum (Episode III)
Voiced by (Japanese): Hiroshi Kamiya

Canaan (カナン, Kanan) is a special Realian created by Vector Industries, who, like M.O.M.O., can pilot an E.S., specifically E.S. Asher. He is not designed like the other Realians and is referred to as an "Enhanced Memory Model" by M.O.M.O. when they first meet in Helmer's office.

During the Miltian Conflict, Lieutenant General Helmer sent him and chaos on a mission to retrieve the U.R.T.V.s and the Y-Data, during which the U-TIC Organization activated the Song of Nephilim, which nearly affected Canaan and caused Federation Soldiers in A.M.W.S. to attack him and chaos. Jin Uzuki saved them and led them to U.R.T.V.s location at Labyrinthos, headquarters of U-TIC. After he and Margulis fought, he entrusted Canaan with information regarding the Miltian Conflict, which is also a fragment of the Y-Data, but something happened that made this data inaccessible to him. Some time later, they found and rescued the variant U.R.T.V.s Jr. and Nigredo (Gaignun Kukai).

Fourteen years later, Canaan is still unable to read the data and experiences occasional blackouts accompanied by data loss, and has spent time at Vector's 2nd Division on Second Militia attempting to extract the Y-Data from his head. Representative Helmer asks him to save Jr., chaos, Ziggy, and M.O.M.O. from being attacked by U-TIC A.W.M.S. Units and he joins the party as they return to Old Milita to extract and analyze the data.

After being antagonised by Doctus throughout the first half of Episode III, Canaan realizes his true identity after analyzing data corresponding to 'Program Canaan' and that he had been a spy for Wilhelm. In Episode III, the special characteristics of Program Canaan allow Canaan to secure a bypass route to Wilhelm's power and convinces him that he could die after his power as a Testament fades and connects Voyager's consciousness with the Compass of Order and Chaos. He and Voyager are then sent into phase space, destroying their bodies.

Canaan is a playable character in the first dungeon of Episode III and wields an energy knife.

=== Miyuki Itsumi ===
Voiced by (English): Heather Hogan (Episodes II & III)
Voiced by (Japanese): Emi Uwagawa

Miyuki Itsumi (ミユキ・イツミ) is a mechanic and systems programmer in Vector Industries First R&D Division involved in the KOS-MOS project under Chief Engineer Shion Uzuki, who created the M.W.S. Mk. I and Mk. II. While she is good friends with Miyuki, Shion is often annoyed by her constant requests for patent authorization so she can build new products under the pretense of the K-PX Project, though it is unknown how many of her inventions have authorized patents. She is romantically involved with her fellow Vector employee Togashi.

After the Woglinde is destroyed by the Gnosis, Miyuki transfers to Second R&D Division, which Shion, who was separated from her team as a result of the incident, does not learn about until later. In Episode I, she comes to aid the party when the Gnosis attack the Kukai Foundation after being drawn to Second Miltia by Albedo and the Song of Nephilim, supplying Shion and KOS-MOS with a Phase Transfer cartridge, which KOS-MOS could integrate into her present armament and use to reveal what was drawing the Gnosis to Second Miltia. In Episode II, she welcomes Shion and Allen home on the Dämmerung after the events at Old Miltia.

When Shion leaves her job at Vector after the events of Xenosaga: A Missing Year, Miyuki keeps in touch with her and offers to help her when she begins to work with the anti-Vector organization Scientia. At the start of Episode III, she joins in on a mission to break into Vector's top secret S-Line Division databank and steal classified data on the Zohar control program Lemegeton, later helping the party break into the Project Zohar weapons testing facility in Fifth Jerusalem and rescue KOS-MOS. In both instances, she is a playable guest character.

=== Allen Ridgeley ===
Voiced by (English): Dave Wittenberg (Episodes II & III)
Voiced by (Japanese): Hiroaki Hirata

Allen is an assistant to Shion Uzuki and the former vice chief of Vector Industries' First R&D Division's KOS-MOS Project Joint Operation Systems Development, who is implied to come from a wealthy family. After graduating from Bormeo University, Allen joined Vector Industries' First R&D Division in T.C. 4764 and was placed on the KOS-MOS development project under then Chief Engineer Kevin Winnicot and Junior Chief Engineer Shion Uzuki. After Kevin was killed in an incident when the KOS-MOS Archetype was prematurely activated by U-TIC, Shion was promoted to Chief Engineer and continued her mentor/fiancé's work while Allen was promoted to Shion's former position as Junior Chief Engineer. While he is in love with Shion, he struggles to confess his feelings and feels that trying to approach her on a romantic level would be harmful to her until she can move on from Kevin's death.

In Episode II, he accompanies Shion in the interior of the Dämmerung and helps her find E.S. Dinah, which they pilot to reach Old Milita and break the Federation quarantine. When Shion leaves Vector to join Scientia, Allen is promoted to the position of Chief Engineer of the First R&D Division and the KOS-MOS project shortly before it is canceled in favor of Roth Mantel's T-elos project. However, Allen struggles with being addressed as "Chief" and uses the term to refer to Shion, who has no title after quitting working for Vector.

At the end of Episode III, Allen, along with Jr., accompanies Shion to find Lost Jerusalem. In Episode III, Allen is a playable character after Shion is captured by Margulis and the U-TIC Organization on the Past Miltia, and wields a futuristic crossbow.

== Other characters ==
=== Albedo ===
Voiced by (English): Crispin Freeman (Episodes II & III)
Voiced by (Japanese): Koichi Yamadera

Albedo Piazzolla (アルベド・ピアソラ, Arubedo Piasora) is U.R.T.V. Unit #667 and one of the few surviving U.R.T.V.s from the Miltian Conflict. He is highly educated in several subjects, including philosophy, science, language and religion, particularly ancient Christianity, and is skilled in strategic planning. Albedo also possesses the ability to regenerate his own limbs, which granted him immortality but also caused his mental instability, as the thought of outliving his friends and family caused him despair. He is the main antagonist of Episode I and Episode II before becoming the White Testament in Episode III.

=== Elsa Crew ===
Six men who own and operate the passenger/cargo cruiser Elsa Von Brabant, also known as the Elsa. Despite their humble status as a small tramp freighter, they are privately employed by the Kukai Foundation due to Matthews' debt to Gaignun Kukai and are often called upon for dangerous missions. However, this does not stop Captain Matthews from involving the Elsa in shady side jobs in an attempt to pay off his debt.

==== Captain Matthews ====
Voiced by (English): Kirk Thornton (Episodes II & III)
Voiced by (Japanese): Unshou Ishizuka

Captain Matthews (マシューズ, Mashūzu) is the Captain of the Elsa, who is in debt to Gaignun Kukai, allegedly because of his spending habits, and previously served as a Galaxy Federation Marine with current Ormus Society A.M.W.S. pilot Hermann. He is an avid fan of the Seraphim Sisters and dreams of attending their concert once the debt is paid. He is also fond of the droids that serve on board the ship and named them after his favorite drinks.

==== Hammer ====
Voiced by (English): Jason Spisak (Episodes II & III)
Voiced by (Japanese): Taiki Matsuno

Hammer (ハマー, Hamā) is the navigator of the Elsa, who possesses vast knowledge of the U.M.N. net. This got him into trouble when he was a teenager, when he hacked into a criminal organization's database, and Captain Matthews rescued him. Since then, his genius and engineering skill has caused Vector to unsuccessfully try to recruit him. At times, his opinion on how to pilot the Elsa clashes with that of Tony, his childhood friend.

Despite it being his job, Hammer seemingly dislikes scavenging the wreckage of starship disasters, like the wreck of the Woglinde, but is dedicated to his job. In Episode I, he made chaos' A.G.W.S. unit from A.G.W.S. parts scavenged from battlefields.

==== Tony ====
Voiced by (English): Henry Dittman (Episodes II & III)
Voiced by (Japanese): Takehito Koyasu

Tony (トニー, Tonī) is the helmsman of the Elsa, who enjoys piloting, but can be egotistical about his piloting skills. Although quite normal and pleasant most of the time and implied to be spiritual and philosophical, his personality completely changes while piloting. Tony's piloting skills come into play several times throughout the series; he outruns a squad of U-TIC Auto-Techs by riding the column wall in Hyperspace, gets Shion and her companions into and out of Proto Merkabah and guides the Elsa through a maze of Ormus Society warships. At the end of Episode II, Tony ferries Jin Uzuki back to Second Miltia on the Elsa. In Episode III, Tony returns as the pilot of the Elsa and provides transportation for the party. When Voyager invades the hangar of the Elsa seeking to abduct KOS-MOS Ver. 3's remains and return them to Wilhelm, Tony participates in the battle to save her, wielding dual pistols.

==== Professor ====
Voiced by (English): Steve Blum
Voiced by (Japanese): Takeshi Aono

Haksheen White (ハカセ, Hakase), also known as The Professor, is an eccentric old scientist who designed and built the Elsa Evolution and is obsessed with creating an "Indestructible Giant Robot." In Episode I, he lives on the Kukai Foundation and, with help from the party, creates Erde Kaiser, a giant combiner-robot made from old parts found in Segment Addresses. In Xenosaga: The Animation, he has a prominent role in the episodes which take place on the Foundation. He oversees Shion's Encephalon dive when she dives into KOS-MOS' mainframe in order to retrieve evidence that proves the Kukai Foundation's innocence in the Woglinde disaster.

In Episode II, he relocates his Robot Academy onto the Elsa and defeats the Dark Professor and Dark Erde Kaiser with help from the party. In Episode III, he, along with Scott and Allen, rebuild KOS-MOS after she is destroyed by T-elos on Rennes-le-Chateau.

==== Assistant Scott ====
Voiced by (English): Brian Chase
Voiced by (Japanese): Kazuya Nakai

Assistant Scott (スコットクン, Sukotto-kun) is the assistant of the Professor and member of the Elsa Crew, who goes along with his nickname due to being overjoyed to be assistant to the Professor he idolizes. He assists the Professor in building the Erde Kaiser in Episode I and Episode II and the party in hacking KOS-MOS in the anime.

Though they often argue and Scott sometimes feels that the Professor does not appreciate him, they share an interest in building giant robots. In the anime, Scott seemingly finds a kindred spirit in Allen, which is also echoed by Scott in Episode II when he is happy to learn that Allen came aboard the Elsa.

=== Febronia ===
Voiced by (English): Kari Wahlgren (Episode III)
Voiced by (Japanese): Mariko Kouda

Febronia (フェブロニア, Feburonia), was a Realian belonging to the Uzuki family who ran a small church near the U-TIC HQ on Old Miltia and was Shion's caretaker. Her sisters, Cecily and Cathe, were part of a machine that kept the original Zohar in power within Labyrinthos. No longer a "living being," she was killed at her church fourteen years prior to the events of Episode I. In Episode I, she helps Shion confront her past, and in Episode II lures Shion to Old Miltia to "save" Cecily and Cathe and is key to the destruction of the Patriarch. In Episode III, it is revealed that during the Miltian Conflict, Febronia took in Virgil after he was injured and they fell in love. However, when rampant Realians attacked her church, Febronia sacrificed herself to protect Virgil and Shion and was killed before being cannibalized. Virgil was traumatized by this incident, which caused his hatred of all Realians and his DME addiction.

=== Gaignun Kukai ===
Voiced by (English): Crispin Freeman (Episodes II & III); Jennifer Hale (child, Episode II); Wendee Lee (child, Episode III)
Voiced by (Japanese): Koichi Yamadera; Mikako Takahashi (child)

Gaignun Kukai (ガイナン・クーカイ, Gainan Kookai) is the chairman of the Kukai Foundation, an organization based in Miltia, whose older brother Jr. poses as his son while he is claimed to be the first son and heir to the industrialist Soze Kukai.

He is later revealed to be U.R.T.V. Unit #669, a biological weapon designed to combat U-DO and nicknamed Nigredo (ニグレド, Niguredo) due to his black hair, with Kukai being a persona created by the Second Miltian government to pool their special operation funds. He has the ability to telepathically communicate with Jr. and Albedo and can use his voice to hypnotically manipulate people, and if necessary, can telekinetically destroy a person. Following the Miltian Conflict and Helmer's rescue of Gaignun and Jr., they adopted the Kukai surname to justify and establish the Kukai Foundation and allow the U.R.T.V. units to live a more normal life. The name Gaignun was derived from one of Nigredo's pet cats that died during the Conflict.

In Episode I, the party first encounters Gaignun when they enter the Kukai Foundation. Soon after, Roman arrests most of the party along with Gaignun on charges of treason until the main party proves the Kukai Foundation's innocence through KOS-MOS's triple A data recordings. When Albedo uses the Song of Nephilim, only Gaignun, chaos & Jr. can hear it, though Shion faintly hears it. During the ending credits, Gaignun discusses the status quo with Helmer over a video link, commenting that Albedo is being drawn into it.

In Episode II, Gaignun's past relationships with Albedo and Jr. are explored. Upon arriving on Miltia with M.O.M.O., Helmer requests that he obtain reconnaissance information to gain insight into Albedo's plans. Later on, flashbacks during the party's dive into Sakura's mind show how a rift grew between the trio of U.R.T.V. units and how Albedo went insane after coming into contact with U-DO. At the end of Episode II, Gaignun suffers from a double personality; one part is Gaignun, the other is Yuriev, his father, who transmigrated into his body following his "death" in TC 4753, when Gaignun, as Nigredo, had apparently shot and killed Yuriev when he was a child. Yuriev awakened in Gaignun's body during the events of Episode II and reveals his presence to Pellegri on a video link, instructing her with telling her superiors that he has returned.

Throughout the series, Gaignun struggles with the fact that he will eventually have to kill his own brother Jr. and the fact that his existence was to monitor Jr. and kill him if necessary; to this end, Yuriev secretly implemented a second Red Dragon drive inside of him to equal Jr.'s power.

In Episode III, Gaignun comes to terms with himself as Albedo arrives as a Testament during Yuriev's power bid after kidnapping Abel. The Zohar sheds some light on the fact that Gaignun presumably allowed Yuriev to take control of his body during the takeover in order to make him proud. As Albedo and Jr. initiate a link in order for Gaignun to be sent into Jr.'s body and Albedo in his Testament form to be sent into another dimension with Yuriev, who is in Gaignun's body. However, Gaignun attempts to switch their minds around, resulting in Albedo's mind being transferred into Jr.'s body. Saying his farewells to Jr. in Albedo's Testament body, Gaignun shows him his true form and tells him that his duty to keep watch over him has ended before being sent into another dimension.

The name Nigredo is derived from the philosophic beliefs of Carl Jung, who believed that the process of self-realization has three major steps that he named using terms derived from alchemy, which he studied prior to developing his theories. These three steps are Nigredo, the death of the old, perceived self, Albedo, the discovering of one's inner identity, and Rubedo (Jr.), the process of living a self-aware life.

=== Vanderkam ===
Voiced by (English): Keith Szarabajka (Episode II); George Manley (anime)

Vanderkam is a Lieutenant Commander working for the U-TIC Organization and a covert operative of the Federation Military.

=== Mary Godwin ===
Voiced by (English): Ali Hillis (Episodes II & III)
Voiced by (Japanese): Rie Kugimiya; Ryōko Shiraishi (anime)

Mary Godwin (メリィ・ゴドウィン, Meri Godowin) is the sister of Shelley Godwin. Although she holds no true rank in the Kukai Foundation organization, Mary functions as Jr.'s second-in-command on board the Durandal and the Chief of the Kukai Foundation's Strategy Division, and is well respected, with members of the Kukai Foundation starting the "Mary & Shelley Fan Club", at the suggestion of Jr. She was born on Miltia, but speaks with an unknown planetary accent. Her name, along with Shelley's, is derived from Mary Shelley.

Mary is temporarily playable in Episode I. She appears in Jr.'s introduction when he has to infiltrate the U-TIC battleship and, along with another Kukai Foundation soldier, are in A.G.W.S. during battle sequences, with Mary piloting a pink Vector A.G.W.S.

=== Shelley Godwin ===
Voiced by (English): Ali Hillis (Episodes II & III)
Voiced by (Japanese): Yumi Takada; Wakana Yamazaki (anime)

Shelley Godwin (シェリィ・ゴトウィン, Sherii Godowin) is the navigator and helmsman of the Durandal, who is idolized by many of the Kukai Foundation through the "Mary & Shelley Fan Club". Shelley possesses a genius IQ, and is capable of performing and excelling in many complicated tasks while navigating Durandal. She was once part of a group of people illegally "owned" by a pharmaceutical company that used them as guinea pigs until Gaignun saved her and Mary twelve years prior to the events of the series and they made the Foundation their new home.

=== Helmer ===
Voiced by (English): Stuart Robinson (Episode II); Keith Szarabajka (Episode III)
Voiced by (Japanese): Masaru Ikeda

Helmer (ヘルマー, Herumā) was once a Lieutenant General in the Federation military, who gave orders to chaos and Canaan to secure the U.R.T.V.s. Following the incident, he entered politics and eventually became Second Miltia's representative in the Galaxy Federation Government. Along with former U.R.T.V.s Jr. (#666) and Nigredo (#669) he co-established the Kukai Foundation to investigate the Miltian Conflict and monitor the U-TIC Organization.

Besides knowing Canaan, chaos, Jr., Gaignun, Dr. Juli Mizrahi, and Jin Uzuki, he is on good terms with Vector Industries' CEO Wilhelm. The Patriarch of the Ormus Society is not fond of him, a sentiment shared by Commander Margulis.

In Xenosaga Episode I, Helmer gets in trouble with Galaxy Federation after an Ormus/U-TIC insider in the Federation helps in a plot that frames Second Miltia and the Kukai Foundation for the destruction of the Woglinde. Helmer and the Federation showed no signs of improving relations after Xenosaga Episode I, although they are not enemies. Outside of the Miltian Conflict, he helps in various political matters and handling the "framing incident", as well as arranging to save Shion and her allies on numerous occasions. He is also implied to have knowledge of U-DO.

In Episode III, during the Planetary Disappearance Phenomenon, he gives an update on the situation to Jr. and the party before the Durandal loses signal from Second Miltia. In the ending, he communicates with Mary and Shelley on the Elsa.

=== Juli Mizrahi ===
Voiced by (English): Kim Mai Guest (Episodes II & III)
Voiced by (Japanese): Naomi Shindou

Dr. Juli Mizrahi (ユリ・ミズラヒ, Yuri Mizurahi), original maiden name Niwashiro, heads investigations into the appearances of the Gnosis. She formed the Subcommittee on Close Encounters, also known as the S.O.C.E., in T.C. 4754. Based in Federation Capital Fifth Jerusalem, she is the ex-wife of Joachim Mizrahi, creator of M.O.M.O. and founder of U-TIC. She hires Ziggurat 8 to transport M.O.M.O. to the Miltian star system instead of bringing her back to the Federation Capital in order to analyze the Y-Data hidden within her subconscious.

In Episode I, Juli, despite legally being M.O.M.O.'s mother, she has a strained relationship with her due to being unable to see her as more than a replacement for her daughter Sakura. After speaking with Ziggy, however, her view of M.O.M.O. started to change. Ziggy, who came to know M.O.M.O. as a real person since he rescued her, suggested that Juli not see M.O.M.O. as an attempt to replace her daughter but as a second daughter, after which she began to realize that she was her own person. After the events of Episode II, she decides to live with M.O.M.O. and accepts her role as her mother, with Ziggy on standby should a crisis arise.

=== Nephilim ===
Voiced by (English): Kim Mai Guest (Episodes II & III)
Voiced by (Japanese): Yumi Tōma

Nephilim (ネピリム, Nepirimu) is a mysterious girl who appears before Shion in the Encephalon and when she sees the Zohar Emulator for the first time on the Woglinde, later appearing in her dreams to warn her about Cherenkov's condition. Shion is initially the only one able to see her until the party arrives at Encephalon, where she warns them about U-DO and the awakening of the "true form of KOS-MOS."

She was alive during the era of Lost Jerusalem, when the Zohar was excavated from Lake Turkana and shipped to Toronto, Canada, where analysis on it began. After it was discovered that the Zohar produced tremendous energy in response to a specific brainwave wavelength, systems programmer Grimoire Verum completed the control program Lemegeton based on the ancient language unearthed from the same ruins where the Zohar was found.

However, the system went out of control during a control experiment, and Nephilim, who participated in the experiment, disappeared along with Earth, which was erased from dimensional space. The Song of Nephilim is the result of amplifying the wavelength created by the Lemegeton through the use of a giant tuning fork, a system designed and built by Joachim Mizrahi.

During the ending clip of Episode III, Nephilim is seen absorbing the Gnosis and transforming into an adult version of herself that resembles Elly.

=== Wilhelm ===
Voiced by (English): Jason Spisak (Episode II and III); Vic Mignogna (anime)

Wilhelm is the CEO of the Vector Industries and the overarching antagonist of Xenosaga.

In reality, Wilhelm is an immortal being as old as the beginning of time, who was created to prevent the destruction of the Lower Domain of the universe, except he has been doing so through eternal recurrence.

=== Testament ===
The Testaments are Wilhelm's closest assistants and servants, who each possess an E.S., a special kind of spacecraft that contains a Vessel of Anima. Four Testaments exist by the end of Episode II: red, blue, black, and white.

== Appearances in other media ==
Shion, KOS-MOS and M.O.M.O., have also appeared in Namco × Capcom for the PlayStation 2 as playable characters.

KOS-MOS and T-elos have also appeared in the Nintendo DS game Super Robot Taisen OG Saga: Endless Frontier and alongside M.O.M.O. in its sequel Super Robot Taisen OG Saga: Endless Frontier EXCEED, in the Nintendo 3DS game Project X Zone and its sequel Project X Zone 2, and as obtainable Blades in Xenoblade Chronicles 2, which later added M.O.M.O. as well

== Merchandise ==
The three female protagonists: Shion, KOS-MOS and MOMO, have had a figurine set released for them.

== Reception ==
The Episode I versions of the characters have been criticized for being too doll-like. However the reviews of later character designs were more positive. 1UP said at the "Tokyo Game Show", Episode II's redesigns were among "...some of the prettiest pictures on the show floor..." specifically naming Shion, KOS-MOS and MOMO.

1UP comments on the replacement of most of the English voice cast being a "surprising move", especially as some other major cast members keep their voice actors, particularly Commander Margulis's voice actor is praised. Later they admit that the change in voice actors is not particularly jarring due to the different character designs.

MOMO Mizrahi

In a review by Edge for Episode III, the site claims that the reason the game scored two 9s by Famitsu, one of which was that "[t]here's a little girl robot [MOMO] whose panties are visible 99% of the time." Another review by the same site criticizes the character, calling her "designed by...a pervert." The reviewer goes on to theorize that much of the gaming world was "enthralled" enough by trying to figure out why this was the case that they were able to play through the game.

The more realistic redesign of MOMO's figure in Episode II plays down her magical school-girl nature. GameSpot criticized her beret, which did not appear in the original game, labeling it "jaunty" and deploring its "unfortunate" return in Xenosaga III.
