= The Oracle (novel) =

2003 young adult fantasy novel by Catherine Fisher

- First edition UK (publ. Hodder & Stoughton)
- Author: Catherine Fisher
- Language: English
- Series: Oracle Prophecies #1
- Publisher: Hodder Children's Books
- Publication date: 1 January 2003
- Pages: 368
- ISBN: 9780340843765 (1st ed. UK paperback)
- OCLC: 59361196
- Followed by: The Archon

The Oracle is a 2003 young adult fantasy novel by Catherine Fisher, which was published in the United States as The Oracle Betrayed.

The Oracle is the first of the Oracle Prophecies Trilogy. The others are The Archon (2004) and The Scarab (2005); with the US titles The Sphere of Secrets and The Day of the Scarab, respectively.

The book was shortlisted for the 2003 Whitbread Awards.

== Plot summary ==
The Oracle is set in a fictional world, in the middle of a terrible drought. The Archon, the god-on-earth, has been called by the god to die, in order to bring rain to the land. Mirany is the bearer-of-the-god, one of the Nine priestesses who attend the god and his various incarnations. Her duty as Bearer is to hold the god in scorpion form in a bronze bowl. The god is fickle, and occasionally claims the Bearer's life. This terrifies Mirany.

As the procession taking the Archon to his death reaches the final destination, the top of a Ziggurat in the City of the Dead, the Archon slips Mirany a note, telling her that the Oracle of the god is being betrayed, and the Speaker is corrupt. The Speaker is the most senior member of the Nine, and relays messages from the god, which he delivers via the Oracle. The Archon is killed by the scorpion the god inhabits, carried by Mirany.

Secretly, Mirany does not believe in the god. She sees him as a lie, used by the Nine to gain favor. However, this changes when he begins to speak directly into her mind.

Mirany discovers a plot by Hermia, the Speaker, and the General Argelin, to control the land, and that the Archon's death was arranged by the two so that they could choose the new Archon, a young boy, and use him as a puppet. Mirany, with the help of the previous Archon's musician Oblek, and Seth, an ambitious scribe, must find the new Archon, and instate him before Hermia and Argelin can.

== Characters ==
- Mirany – The Bearer-of-the-god. Roughly sixteen, brown-haired, dark-eyed and brown-skinned. At the beginning of the series she is timid and shy, some of the other Nine calling her "Mousy Mirany from Mylos". She has a soft spot for Seth.
- Seth – An ambitious scribe, thief and tomb robber with two conflicting personalities. About seventeen. He is tall, dark-haired and handsome, and often acts cocky and arrogant when nervous. He is very loyal to the people he cares about, and works immensely to better their life. He has a soft spot for Mirany.
- Alexos – The 10-year-old god on earth, tall and wise for his age. Dark-haired and dark-eyed, loves music and animals. As the god and himself, he can speak to Mirany (and later Seth) inside their heads.
- Kreon – The 'shadow' or 'brother' of the god-on-earth, in this case, Alexos. He is the King of the places where the light doesn't reach.
- Oblek – The fat, alcoholic musician and closest friend of the previous Archon, protective and caring.
- The Jackal – A tomb thief and self described King of Thieves, previously known as Lord Osarkon. The Jackal is tall and elegant with long fair hair, and almond-shaped eyes. He is haunted by nightmares of his troubled past.
- The Fox – The Jackal's henchman and closest friend. One-eyed and red-haired, he is brusque and tough.
- Argelin – General of the Port's army, obsessed with becoming King. Consumed by love, lust and passion for Hermia.
- Hermia – The Speaker who speaks words of her own and betrays the god. Argelin's lover and co-conspirator. She is described as being in her mid-twenties, tall, dark-haired, dark-eyed.
- Rhetia – The god's Cupbearer, tall, brave and strong. Rhetia is very ambitious, and wishes to be Speaker. She is ruthless, and will use whoever she needs to achieve her ends.
- Chryse – Taster for the god. Mirany's ex-best friend, Chryse is blonde and pretty, and often assumed to be brainless. However, she is sly and self-serving, managing to do what is best for herself, including repeatedly switching sides.

== Awards ==
Awards for The Oracle
Year	Award	Result	Ref.
2003	Whitbread Children's Book Award	Shortlisted	
2003	Bram Stoker Award for Best Work for Young Readers	Shortlisted	
