= Ai Maeda (voice actress) =

Japanese voice actress (born 1975)

- 前田 愛
- Ai Maeda singing at the convention Anime Oasis Reborn in Boise, Idaho on May 23 2015
- Born: April 19, 1975 (age 51); Kobe, Hyōgo Prefecture, Japan
- Other name: AiM
- Occupations: Voice actress, singer
- Years active: 1996–present
- Agent: Aoni Production
- Notable credit(s): Digimon Adventure as Mimi Tachikawa; Sailor Moon Crystal as Setsuna Meioh/Sailor Pluto; Yes! PreCure 5 as Karen Minazuki/Cure Aqua
- Spouse: Ryōtarō Okiayu (m. 2013)

Ai Maeda (前田 愛, Maeda Ai; born April 19, 1975 in Kobe, Hyōgo, Japan) is a Japanese voice actress and singer associated with Aoni Production. As a singer, Maeda releases music under the stage name AiM and is credited as a songwriter under the name Ai.

== Filmography ==
=== Anime ===
Year	Title	Role	Source
1996	GeGeGe no Kitarō (4th Series)	Child / Student B / Boy B	
1997	Detatoko Princess	Wife	
1998	Sentimental Graffiti	Emiru Nagakura	
1999	Digimon Adventure	Mimi Tachikawa	
2000	Digimon Adventure 02	Mimi Tachikawa	
2000–01	Baby Felix	Marin	
2000	Mushrambo	Sanju	
2001	Angelic Layer: Battle Doll	Torimaki B	
2001	Super Gals! Kotobukiran	Yukie Mochida	
2001	Najica Blitz Tactics (episode 4)	Haruka	
2003	F-Zero Falcon Densetsu	Kate Allen	
2003	Zatch Bell!	Megumi Oumi	
2004	Samurai Champloo	Koza	
2004	Beet the Vandel Buster	Poala	
2005	Xenosaga The Animation	Shion Uzuki	
2005	Beet the Vandel Buster Exerion	Poala	
2006	Gaiking: Legend of Daiku-Maryu	Abeya Kyoko	
2006	Kamisama Kazoku	Kumiko Komori	
2006	La Corda d'Oro: Primo Passo	Mai Tsugawa	
2007	Strait Jacket	Nerin Simmons	
2007–08	Yes! PreCure 5	Karen Minazuki/Cure Aqua	
2007	Ge Ge Ge no Kitarou (5th Series)	Chigusa Kataoka	
2007	Hatara Kizzu Maihamu Gumi	Mizuki Kotobuki	
2007	Artificial insect KABUTO BORG Victory by Victory	Amelia	
2008–09	Yes! PreCure 5 GoGo!	Karen Minazuki/Cure Aqua	
2008	Ge Ge Ge no Kitarou (5th Series)	Midori	
2009–10	Kaidan Restaurant	Kazuyo Ohzora / Ako's Mother	
2009	Sasameki Koto	Noe Hayasumi	
2009	One Piece	Elizabeth (Fantasy)	
2010	Nurarihyon no Mago	Yura Keikain	
2014	M3 the dark metal	Kasane Agura	
2015	Pretty Guardian Sailor Moon Crystal Season II	Sailor Pluto	ONA, Black Moon arc
2016	Pretty Guardian Sailor Moon Crystal Season III	Setsuna Meioh/Sailor Pluto	TV Anime, Death Busters arc
2016	Tiger Mask W	Queen Elizabeth	
2017	One Piece	Charlotte Galette	
2020	Digimon Adventure:	Valdurmon	
2023	Power of Hope: PreCure Full Bloom	Karen Minazuki/Cure Aqua	

=== Film ===
Year	Title	Role	Notes
2000	Digimon Adventure: Our War Game!	Mimi Tachikawa	
2000	Digimon Adventure 02: Digimon Hurricane Landing!! / Transcendent Evolution!! The Golden Digimentals	Mimi Tachikawa	
2001	Digimon Adventure 02: Revenge of Diaboromon	Mimi Tachikawa	
2003	Kill Bill: Volume 1	O-Ren Ishii	animated sequence
2004	Kill Bill: The Whole Bloody Affair	O-Ren Ishii	animated sequence
2005	Zatch Bell!: Attack of Mechavulcan	Megumi Ooumi	
2007	Yes! PreCure 5 The Movie: Great Miraculous Adventure in the Mirror Kingdom!	Karen Minazuki/Cure Aqua	
2008	Yes! PreCure 5 GoGo! The Movie: Happy Birthday in the Sweet Kingdom!	Karen Minazuki/Cure Aqua	
2009	Pretty Cure All Stars DX: Everyone's Friends - the Collection of Miracles!	Karen Minazuki/Cure Aqua	
2010	Pretty Cure All Stars DX2: Light of Hope - Protect the Rainbow Jewel!	Karen Minazuki/Cure Aqua	
2011	Pretty Cure All Stars DX3: Deliver the Future! The Rainbow-Colored Flower That Connects the World	Karen Minazuki/Cure Aqua	
2014	Pretty Cure All Stars New Stage 3: Eternal Friends	Karen Minazuki/Cure Aqua	
2015	Persona 3 The Movie: No. 3, Falling Down	Chihiro Fushimi	
2016	Persona 3 The Movie: No. 4, Winter of Rebirth	Chihiro Fushimi	
2018	Hug! Pretty Cure Futari wa Pretty Cure: All Stars Memories	Karen Minazuki/Cure Aqua	
2021	Pretty Guardian Sailor Moon Eternal The Movie	Setsuna Meioh/Super Sailor Pluto	2-Part Film, Season 4 of Sailor Moon Crystal (Dead Moon arc)
2021	Healin' Good Pretty Cure the Movie: GoGo! Big Transformation! The Town of Dreams	Karen Minazuki/Cure Aqua	
2023	Pretty Guardian Sailor Moon Cosmos The Movie	Setsuna Meioh/Eternal Sailor Pluto	2-Part Film, Season 5 of Sailor Moon Crystal (Shadow Galactica arc)

=== Television ===
Year	Title	Role	Notes
2009–11	Kid vs. Kat	Wanda	

=== OVA ===
- Spectral Force 2 ~Eien naru Kiseki~ Range (2001)
- Halo Legends (Odd One Out) Cortana (2010)

=== Video games ===
- Kemono Friends, Tamama (Girl Type)
- Real Sound: Kaze no Regret, Girls (1997)
- Xenosaga Episode I, Shion Uzuki (2002)
- Zatch Bell! video games, Megumi Oumi (2003)
- Xenosaga Episode II, Shion Uzuki (2004)
- Samurai Warriors series, Oichi and Samurai Woman (2004-current)
- Namco × Capcom, Shion Uzuki (2005)
- Azumi2 Death Or Love (2005)
- Xenosaga Episode III, Shion Uzuki (2006)
- Tokimeki Memorial Girl's Side 2nd Kiss, Haruhi Nishimoto (2006)
- Warriors Orochi series, Oichi (2007–19)
- Yggdra Union: We'll Never Fight Alone (PSP version), Nietzsche and Eudy (2008)
- Rune Factory 2, Yue/Aria (2008)
- Persona 4, Chihiro Fushimi (2008)
- Dark Escape 4D, Courtney Wall (2012)
- Digimon Adventure PSP, Mimi Tachikawa (2013)
- Puyopuyo!! Quest, Setsuna Meioh/Super Sailor Pluto (2013)
- Deception IV: Another Princess, Valgyrie (2014)
- Digimon Story: Cyber Sleuth, Sayo (2015)
- Dragon Ball Legends, Yurin (2018)
- Counter:Side, Serina (2021)

== Discography ==
=== Singles ===
Release date	Title	c/w	Notes	Catalogue No.:	Peak Chart Position
April 23, 1999	I Wish	Itsudemo Aeru Kara	Digimon Adventure - First Ending	NEDA-10002	---
June 25, 1999	Ashita e no Jumon	Aozora no Yuku Kumo no you ni THE ETERNAL MIRACLE: Eien naru Kiseki	Muhou - Ending Theme and Spectral Wars Aishiki Jaaku - Theme	NEDA-10003	---
August 6, 1999	BREAK OUT!	---	---	NEDA-10007	---
October 8, 1999	Keep On	On the Hill: Kaze wo Kanjite	Digimon Adventure - Second Ending	NEDA-10009	---
October 8, 1999	LIKE A CANDLE	Fallin' Angel	Junjou de Karen Meimai Kishidan Spectral Wars Seishojo Gaiden - Theme	NEDA-10010	---
April 26, 2000	Sakuhin No. 2 "Haru" Ichocho: Bokura no WarGame	Akiramenaide (lit. Don't Give Up)	Digimon Adventure: Bokura no WarGame - Ending	NEDA-10020	85
April 26, 2000	Ashita wa Atashi no Kaze ga Fuku	Now is the Time!	Digimon Adventure 02 - First Ending	NEDA-10022	50
July 5, 2000	Stand by Me: Hito Natsu no Bouken	Fired Out / Sun Goes Down	Digimon Adventure 02: Hurricane Jouriku!! Chouzetsu Shinka!! Ougon no Digimental - Ending	NEDA-10024	90
October 25, 2000	Itsumo Itsudemo	Eien no Kagayaki	Digimon Adventure 02 - Second Ending	NECM-12001	93
February 21, 2001	Friend: Itsumademo Wasurenai	Party	Digimon Adventure 02: Diablomon no Gyakushu - Ending	NECM-12003	94
April 25, 2001	My Tomorrow	Himawari (lit. Sunflower)	Digimon Tamers - First Ending	NEDA-10028	70
May 23, 2001	Go!Go!Ready?Go?!	Go!Go!Ready?Go?! (ParaPara Version); Go!Go!Ready?Go?! (Trance Version)	Ask Dr. Rin! - Opening Theme	NECM-12008	---
May 23, 2001	Dareyori	Kitto	Ask Dr. Rin! - First Ending	NECM-12009	---
July 4, 2001	Moving On!	Fragile Heart	Digimon Tamers: Boukensha Tachi no Tatakai - Ending	NECM-12010	95
October 10, 2001	Days: Aijou to Nichijou	Let's Get Dream!	Digimon Tamers - Second Ending	NECM-12015	68
November 29, 2001	Kimi no Mirai	Never Be The Same	Ask Dr. Rin! - Second Ending	NECM-12020	---
March 6, 2002	Yuhi no Yakusoku	My Place	Digimon Tamers: Bousou Digimon Tokkyu	NEDA-10024	---
November 22, 2002	an Endless Tale	Harukana Okurimono	Digimon Frontier - Second Ending; Duet with Kōji Wada	NECM-12038	---
March 5, 2003	my Light	Friend: Itsumademo Wasurenai	Theme of AiM no Igai to Iyashimasu!	NECM-10001	169
December 3, 2003	Resolution	Forever	F-Zero Falcon Densetsu - Insert & Ending Theme	NECM-12064	---
November 25, 2015	I Wish: Tri. Version	---	Digimon Adventure tri. - First Ending	NECM-10233	71
February 22, 2017	Keep On: Tri. Version	Kimi no Hikari	Digimon Adventure tri. - Fourth Ending	NECM-13027	61
September 27, 2017	Ai Kotoba	P T G	Digimon Adventure tri. - Fifth Ending; Duet with Ayumi Miyazaki	NECM-90015	16
February 21, 2020	Hanarete ite mo	---	Digimon Adventure: Last Evolution Kizuna - Ending	NECM-13034	---
December 20, 2023	Various Colors	---	Digimon Adventure 02 The Beginning - Ending	NECM-13037	---

=== Compilation albums ===
Release date	Title	Catalogue No.:	Peak Chart Position
April 23, 2014	Ichigo	Limited Ed.: NEZA-90010; Regular Ed. NECA-30307	284
April 23, 2014	15	Limited Ed.: NEZA-90012; Regular Ed. NECA-30308	254
