= Bram Stoker Award for Best Work for Young Readers =

The Bram Stoker Award for Best Work for Young Readers is a discontinued award presented by the Horror Writers Association (HWA) for "superior achievement" in horror writing for young readers.

== Winners and nominees ==
Nominees are listed below the winner(s) for each year.

Bram Stoker Award for Best Work for Young Readers
| Year | Recipient | Title | Citation |
|---|---|---|---|
| 1998 | Nancy Etchemendy | Bigger than Death | Winner |
| 1998 | Mike Ford | The Dollhouse that Time Forgot | Nominee |
| 1998 | Nancy Holder | The Angel Chronicles | Nominee |
| 1998 | Ellen Steiber | Hungry Ghosts | Nominee |
| 1999 | J.K. Rowling | Harry Potter and the Prisoner of Azkaban | Winner |
| 1999 | Joe R. Lansdale | Something Lumber This Way Comes | Nominee |
| 1999 | Angus Oblong | Creepy Susie and 13 Other Tragic Tales for Troubled Children | Nominee |
| 2000 | Nancy Etchemendy | The Power of Un | Winner |
| 2000 | J.K. Rowling | Harry Potter and the Goblet of Fire | Nominee |
| 2000 | Edo van Belkom, editor | Be Afraid! | Nominee |
| 2000 | F. Paul Wilson | The Christmas Trilogy | Nominee |
| 2001 | Yvonne Navarro | The Willow Files 2 | Winner |
| 2001 | Christopher Golden | Prowlers | Nominee |
| 2002 | Neil Gaiman | Coraline | Winner |
| 2002 | Clive Barker | Abarat | Nominee |
| 2002 | Nancy Etchemendy | Cat in Glass and Other Tales of the Unnatural | Nominee |
| 2002 | Richard Matheson and William Stout | Abu and the 7 Marvels | Nominee |
| 2003 | J.K. Rowling | Harry Potter and the Order of the Phoenix | Winner |
| 2003 | Steve Burt | Even Odder: More Stories To Chill The Heart | Nominee |
| 2003 | Catherine Fisher | The Oracle | Nominee |
| 2003 | Neil Gaiman and Dave McKean | The Wolves in the Walls | Nominee |
| 2003 | Nina Kiriki Hoffman | A Stir of Bones | Nominee |
| 2004 | Clive Barker | Abarat: Days of Magic, Nights of War | Winner |
| 2004 | Steve Burt | Oddest Yet | Winner |
| 2004 | Dean Koontz | Robot Santa: The Further Adventures of Santa's Twin | Nominee |
| 2004 | Jeff Mariotte | Fall (Witch Season series) | Nominee |
