= Incarceron =

2007 novel by Catherine Fisher

- First edition 2007
- Author: Catherine Fisher
- Language: English
- Genre: Young adult, dystopian future, Science fiction
- Published: 3 May 2007 Hodder (UK); January 26, 2010 Dial Books (US)
- Publication place: United Kingdom; United States
- Media type: Hardcover, Paperback, Ebook
- Pages: 442
- ISBN: 978-0-340-89360-9 (UK); 9780803733961 (US)
- LC Class: PZ7.D2587Maz 2009
- Followed by: Sapphique

Incarceron (2007) is a young-adult fantasy and science fiction novel written by Catherine Fisher that was first released on May 3, 2007. Published by Hodder Children's Books, it is the first in a line of novels centered on Finn and Claudia, two adolescents individually confined by the Warden of Incarceron. A sequel to the book, entitled Sapphique, was published in 2008. Incarceron was first released in the United States in 2010 and appeared on the New York Times children's bestseller list. 20th Century Fox owns the film rights to the novel. The book has been released in paperback and as an audio book, read by Kim Mai Guest.

== Inspiration and origins ==
Catherine Fisher "wanted to write a book about a prison" and conceived Incarceron, an automated world controlled by a personified mechanical power. Incarceron is vast and expands through whole villages, forests, cells and corridors.

== Setting ==
Incarceron is a futuristic prison and an artificial world—a living artificial world run by Incarceron, an artificial intelligence. This tireless, inhuman "overlord" controls all life as it monitors inmates by means of cameras that appear as glowing red lights and dispenses punishment and death on a daily basis without mercy. Escape from Incarceron is a concept which few believe in, except those who insist that Sapphique, the legendary Sapient, has in fact achieved this very act.

Initially, the intent of Incarceron’s creators, the Sapienti, was to incarcerate all the criminals in the world and repair their morals to form a perfect society, controlled with the help of the Prison entity "Incarceron". The prisoners and seventy Sapienti inside were sealed off from the world in order to control all variables in this experiment, with the exception of the prison Warden to oversee the project. However, after years of isolation and the failure of the perfect society, those inside have no way to seek help or escape when the Warden abandons the experiment’s aims.

=== The Realm ===
The Sapienti created Incarceron during a time of advanced technology and discovery. However, since then, King Endor released a royal decree that Time would be "stopped" in order for humanity to survive, and now the Realm is trapped in the 17th century. The King justified that they were making a world “free from the anxiety of change.” The Protocol prevents the development of science and evolution, and has since hindered Sapienti, and provided problems against freeing those in Incarceron. Change is not allowed which angers many nobles and they plot against the Queen.

== Characters ==
- Finn: One of the two main protagonists of the book. He is a Prisoner inside Incarceron and also a "cell-born", which means child of the prison. He claims he came from Outside. He has a tattoo of an eagle on his wrist. Throughout the book he has seizures where he sees a young boy living in a distant place. He believes these to be memories he had of Outside. He receives a crystal key adorned with an eagle, the same design of the tattoo on his wrist. Oath-brother of Keiro.
- Claudia: The second protagonist; A young girl living in the Realm. Fed up with the secrecy of her father, the Warden of Incarceron, she sneaks into his office and finds a crystal key adorned with a holographic eagle. This key has a direct connection to the key within Incarceron, allowing Finn and Claudia to communicate and devise Finn's Escape.
- Keiro: Finn's Oath-brother within the Comitatus, a band of ruthless thieves and bandits. He's described as having a perfect appearance. Ever since Finn's induction into the Comitatus, they have been looking out for each other, even if it means crossing the Comitatus' leader Jormanric.
- Attia: A Prisoner who follows Finn devoutly after he saved her life when she was Jormanric's dog-slave.
- Gildas: A descendant of the original Sapienti who entered the Prison on the day of its opening. He fervently believes that Finn is a Starseer, one who communicates with Sapphique and will lead the people within Incarceron.
- Jared: The youngest known man to become a Sapient and was hired by the Warden for this. He helps Claudia in discerning the mechanisms of the crystal key and provides advice to Finn and his group. He and Claudia share a very close relationship, oftentimes it is hinted as something more.
- Incarceron: The living prison was created to house all the undesirables of the world. It is a closed system, nothing can get in nor out save for those who use the crystal key. It was designed and intended to be a utopian paradise, giving free education, healthcare and protection to those within. However, over time, the negative aspects of the people inside it became too much and corrupted it, turning it into the ruthless jailor the book presents.
- John Arlex: The Warden of Incarceron. He is the father of Claudia. Like the Wardens before him, he has kept the true state of the Incarceron experiment from the Realm, instead saying that the experiment is a success.
- Queen Sia: The Queen of the Realm. She is described as having an ageless appearance. The mother of Caspar.
- Caspar: The Earl of Steen and Crown Prince of the Realm, son of Queen Sia. He is spoiled, arrogant and dimwitted. He is betrothed to Claudia.
- Maestra: A member of the Civicry. She is the one who finds the crystal key within the Prison that sets the events of the book in motion.
- Jormanric: The Winglord of the Comitatus. He is described as being a big and burly man. He is rarely seen without eating ket.
- Sapphique: Also called the Nine Fingered One, is a man of legend. He is believed to have been a Sapient that escaped the Prison. Characters within the book often refer to him when talking about Outside or Escape. He is also worshipped by a small number of people.
- Lord Jason Calliston: First prisoner of Incarceron. He was a member of the Steel Wolves.

== Cover ==
The cover is an image of the key, “a small cylindered artifact” with the hologram of the Realm’s royal eagle. Created by Lord Calliston, the "Steel Wolf", who was the first Prisoner to be sent into Incarceron, it can communicate with other keys of the same design, provide a blind spot from Incarceron’s security system, and allow one human to leave Incarceron. Lord Calliston died before he could use it.

== Critical reception ==
The book had received largely positive reviews from book critics. Amanda Craig from The Times praised the novel for its “imaginative scale and gobsmacking finale”, naming the book as “one of the best fantasy novels written for a long time.” In agreement is Independent, calling the plot “a deliciously dark and scary ride,” as well as identifying Fisher as one of the best fantasy writers of today. Fisher’s accomplished skills and depth of feeling was recognised by The Bookseller, who described the novel as “imaginative, rich in texture and vividly realised.”

Junot Diaz from The Wall Street Journal labelled the book as a thriller of the highest order and said that “Fisher could give the show '24' a run for its money,” while Mary Quattlebaum from The Washington Post praised “this eerie, elegant fantasy”, highlighting the intricate plot, fictitious universe and likening the relationship of the book and readers to Incarceron and its prisoners.

In agreement was the Booklist, who labelled the book as a “must have,” and Publishers Weekly, certain that the “complex and inventive” book would be a resounding success. The Horn Book praised “Fisher's dystropic future, in which technology and decay coexist in a dazzling kaleidoscope of images and time periods.”

=== Awards ===
- The Times Children's Book of the Year

ALA Best Books For Young Adults 2011
