= The Books of Abarat =

Novel series by Clive Barker

- Abarat; Days of Magic, Nights of War; Absolute Midnight; Kry Rising; Until The End of Time
- Author: Clive Barker
- Illustrator: Clive Barker
- Cover artist: Clive Barker
- Country: United States
- Language: English
- Genre: Fantasy literature, young adult fiction
- Publisher: HarperCollins

The Books of Abarat are a series of young adult fantasy novels written and illustrated by English writer and visual artist Clive Barker. The series is intended to contain five books, three of which have been published from 2002 to 2011. The series takes place on the Abarat, a fictional archipelago consisting of twenty-five islands, one for each hour of the day (and one extra).

== Series ==
- Abarat (2002)
- Days of Magic, Nights of War (2004)
- Absolute Midnight (2011)
- Kry Rising (forthcoming; working title)
- Until The End of Time (forthcoming; working title; intended as final volume)

== History ==
Barker began painting illustrations for the first book in the series, Abarat, in 1995. He had originally intended for these paintings to be used in a 25-story "Book of Hours". As the number of paintings increased and the plot idea expanded, he decided the series would require four books (later increased to five) to fully contain the plot and characterisation.

== Islands of the Abarat ==
The series is set on the "Islands of Abarat", of which each is based on a time of day (except the last island, which is based on the 25th hour). These islands are mounted in the Sea of Izabella, an ocean sometimes personified by the characters. Together, they compose what is described as "a limitless world" encompassing "chaotic diversity", called Abarat. Below are descriptions based on statements attributed to the character Samuel Hastrim Klepp, author of the popular tour-guide Klepp's Almenak:

=== 1:00 a.m. The Pyramids of Xuxux ===
"There is no quieter place in the Abarat than at One o'Clock in the morning, where the six Pyramids of Xuxux rise out of the dark and uncannily placid waters of the Izabella". Some have suggested that these pyramids and the Ziggurat of Soma Plume at 5:00 p.m. were "designed by the same hand and built by the same masons". The writer of Klepp's Almenak, the omnipresent traveller's guide to the Abarat, disagrees, claiming that "the tombs at Soma Plume are calm and curiously reassuring places" whereas the six pyramids at Xuxux are "sites of mystery and tragedy". The character Christopher Carrion uses the pyramids as a breeding-ground for the diverse, monstrous insects known as the Sacbrood.

=== 2:00 a.m. Idjit ===
Klepp, who never visited it while sober, described Idjit as an island of "immense charm", saying that it "encourages excesses, a kind of happy foolishness". It shares with neighbouring Gorgossium a "spiky, barren topography, [while] storms rage perpetually about the landscape. It has been calculated [Klepp adds] that a visitor to Idjit is more likely to be struck by lightning than a man on the roosts of Efreet is to be hit by bird excrement". The result is either instant death (as in the human world) or euphoria.

=== 3:00 a.m. Pyon ===
Pyon is described as having been "once a quiet island, but no longer. The work of an entrepreneur by the name of Rojo Pixler has transformed the island utterly. It was Pixler's dream (some have said folly) to build the biggest city in the archipelago on Pyon, its light so bright that the darkness of the Hour would be a grand irrelevance". This is Commexo City, a Las Vegas-like tourists' paradise whose image Pixler seeks to impose on the entire archipelago, and whose site was formerly occupied by a mansion associated with the Carrion family.

=== 4:00 a.m. Isle of the Black Egg ===
Here "lie the Pius Mountains, a range of needle-sharp crags that are the tallest natural phenomenon on the islands". These are the home of peaceful, mountain-dwelling villagers, but are also the origin named of the character Geneva Peachtree, who is once described as a "revolutionary". Klepp claims to have "discovered to date two hundred and seventeen explanations for the name [of the island], each contradicting the next. As I cannot distinguish the value of any one explanation over any other, and it seems arbitrary to simply pick one for retelling here", and adds, "I'd prefer to simply state that nobody knows how the island got its name and leave it at that".

=== 5:00 a.m. Speckle Frew ===
Speckle Frew is "geographically an uneventful island; the earth is sandy and covered with fine, sharped-edged grass, while the wind is always howling. Though the terrain is scarcely varied, the island is home to a wide variety of species, most of them dangerous". Being the habitat of such animals, Speckle Frew is called "a bestiary" and "not to be trespassed lightly". Despite this, it is suggested to be a quiet landing-point by a seafaring character called a "Sea-Skipper", and a mystic named Mariah Cappella is said to have lived there. Mariah's son is Finnegan Hob, a figure of some importance to the story.

=== 6:00 a.m. Efreet ===
"Unlike its neighbour, Speckle Frew, which has always been a wild spot, Efreet was once an island of great sophistication. The city of Koy, considered to have been the most cultured city in the Abarat, was built on the lower steppes of the island. Opinions vary as to how long it stood and why it fell, but what remains of the city – rows of pillars, archways, and frescoes – testifies to a site of elegance and learning". Efreet is also home to five infamous monsters: the armoured, orange Waztrill; the Thrak, a purple beast with a small head and huge compound eyes; the serpentine Vexile; the shaggy, blue, lice-infested Sanguinius; and the bipedal Fever Gibe.

=== 7:00 a.m. Autland ===
Autland is "joined to Efreet by the Gilholly Bridge. There is a palace on Autland, built for Queen Muzzel McCray, to a design that appeared to her in a dream, or so local legend dictates. The Queen's husband was a creature called Nimbus, Lord of the Tarrie-cats. Nimbus still lives in McCray's palace, inside the dream – so to speak – of the woman he loved".

=== 8:00 a.m. Obadiah ===
This is "an island of extraordinary flora. Here a visitor will find strange and sometimes aggressive plants growing in virtually inexhaustible profusion. Some have called Obadiah the Elegiac's Garden, and suggested it may have been a laboratory in which the mythic Creators of Abarat, A'zo and Cha, experimented with [the evolution of life]".

=== 9:00 a.m. Qualm Hah ===
This is "a puzzling place to explore, because it has two distinct faces. At the western edge of the island stands the busy seaport of Tazmagor, where the food is good, the people happy, and the air filled with the din of extemporised songs". "Toward the eastern end of the island", nothing is built, and no one gives a reason for not doing so; this, says Klepp, is peculiar, given overpopulation in Tazmagor.

=== 10:00 a.m. Spake ===
This is a mountainous island having many cypress trees on its lower slopes: "On its heights, above the trees, stands a simple stage, which has been used for performances of every kind – circuses, slapsticks, and High Tragedy – since the beginning of known time". By a consequence of the island's location, its Theatre "is every three days shrouded in a mist that blows from the southeast", surrounding the hill, and both fog and Theatre are illuminated by "tiny flames" therein.

=== 11:00 a.m. Nully ===
"Topographically speaking, the island merits little study, but it is the location of one of the Abarat's most extraordinary buildings: the Repository of Remembrance", which is described as the Abarat's most famous museum. "The toys of emperors, the rag dolls of queens", and other now useless but historically and sentimentally valuable objects are kept here.

=== 12:00 noon Yzil ===
The island of Yzil is a "lush and temperate" forest. Here lives the Princess Breath, a figure of Abaratian legend who by her exhalations creates live things, which are then wafted through the air until they arrive at some suitable habitat. She is mentioned in the first book and seen in the second book by characters Malingo and Candy.

=== 1:00 p.m. Hobarookus ===
Hobarookus is a small, rocky, swampy island inhabited by pirates and buccaneers. The food produced there is prepared by the best cooks in the Abarat, because of the hour's use as a lunch time. Kalukwa birds, a species of bird whose eggs "hatch downy human babies every ninth year", are common throughout the swampy areas, called the Sinks. These babies are commonly taken and raised by the pirates.

=== 2:00 p.m. Orlando's Cap ===
Orlando's Cap is a small, ill-favored island. It is here that an insane asylum is located, because the founder believed that the 2:00 hour promotes healing in the soul. Patients are apparently allowed the run of the islands, and have been given permission to follow artistic disciplines, which means that there are many weird and wonderful sculptures and objects created by the patients.

=== 3:00 p.m. The Nonce ===
The Nonce is a beautiful, drowsy island. Most people who visit fall asleep quickly, and dream about the beginning of the world. This implies that the Nonce is the site of that event. It is also notable for its torrential rainstorms, which wreak havoc on the native plants before becoming the water supply of new growth. This new growth takes the form of a rainforest so biologically diverse that there is often little separation between plants and animals. The name "nonce" means "the immediate" or "the moment at hand".

=== 4:00 p.m. Gnomon ===
This island is riddled with the ruins of temples and Oracles. On many parts of the island, the air is full of "whispering voices", all sounding at once. Many roads on the island lead nowhere; thus leading to the speculation that Gnomon was once part of the island of Soma Plume. Whether this would violate the accepted correspondence of hours to islands is not revealed.

=== 5:00 p.m. Soma Plume ===
Soma Plume is a large island, twice the size of Gnomon. It houses the Great Noahic Ziggurat, a place that has been used for burial of the dead for many generations.

=== 6:00 p.m. Babilonium ===
This island consists of a single, immense carnival, encompassing rides, comedic plays, freak shows, and all other manners of entertainment.

=== 7:00 p.m. Scoriae ===
Scoriae is the meeting place of night and day, also known as the 'Island of Lengthening Shadows'. It has on it a live volcano known as Galigali, as well as the Twilight Palace, which once belonged to King Claus of Day. Galigali has destroyed three great cities in its time: Gosh, Divinium, and Mycassius, without leaving survivors. Ruins of the cities, as well as the Twilight Palace, still remain.

=== 8:00 p.m. Yebba Dim Day ===
This island, also known as the Great Head, is a sort of "informal capital" of the islands. It is fashioned in the shape of a giant humanoid head and shoulders in the likeness of its late owner Gorki Doodat. It is a labyrinth of tunnels on the inside, and the outside is mostly covered by shabby dwellings, save for the half-dozen high towers atop the statue's cranium. Some of these towers are said to contain individuals of immeasurable age. This island is Candy's first destination in the Abarat, but is destroyed in the third book.

=== 9:00 p.m. Huffaker ===
Huffaker is a large island, peppered with huge rock formations resembling "natural cathedrals", the largest of which being Hap's Vault. Lydia Hap, after whom this cavern was named, claims that the Vault (which she refers to as the Chamber of the Skein) is the origin of the so-called Abaratic Skein, a thread of light which connects everything in every world to everything else.

=== 10:00 p.m. Ninnyhammer ===
This island has almost no "noteworthy" characteristics, save for the town known as High Sladder, inhabited by the "tribe of feral tarrie-cats". On the northeast side of the island is the wizard Kaspar Wolfswinkel's house, which some, upon seeing the glass observatory in the roof, have mistaken for a giant eye or temple. This house has traditionally been inhabited by wizards or magicians, but little else is said of it. Its dome is broken early on in the story, but the remnants retain the power of magnifying both the image of the viewer inside and the objects he sees outside.

=== 11:00 p.m. Jibarish ===
This is a mostly barren island, on which the rock is fluid, fire is cold, water is like iron, and the air changes any spoken word into complete gibberish; hence the name. Jibarish is a place of paradoxes and confusion. The island is occupied by a tribe of women, who cause the changes. Nearby is a smaller island inhabited by the enchantress Laguna Munn, consulted by Candy and Malingo in the third book.

=== 12:00 midnight Gorgossium ===
The island of Midnight is a dark mountain cloaked in red mists. On top is the fortress Iniquisit, a palace of thirteen towers. The Carrion clan has occupied this Hour long before the emergence of any written record. Rumored features on the island include a forest of gallows and a garden of flesh-eating plants. This island is, until the second book, home to the Prince of Midnight, Christopher Carrion. He is generally known as the most evil person in all of the islands of the Abarat, though his cruelty is surpassed by that of his grandmother, Mater Motley, who in the third book replaces the fortress with a single tower of her own.

=== The 25th Hour/Odom's Spire ===
The Twenty-Fifth Hour is also commonly called by other names including "Odom's Spire", "Whence", "Lud", and "the Time Out of Time". It is the home of Diamanda, Joephi, and Mespa, the three 'sisters of the Fantomaya'. The Fantomaya are three powerful, wise enchantresses, who immerse themselves in the constant stream of memories that permeate the Spire. They are the guardians of this stream of memories, which encompass all histories of the universe. The island is also home to Abraham Hollow, a territorial warden, and to his assistants Tempus and Julius, who are called the Fugit Brothers. It has a reputation for leaving only insane survivors, as the Fugits drive any intruder they capture insane before killing them.

=== Others ===
Though there are other small landmasses amongst the larger Islands of the archipelago, few of them are large enough to be considered "islands". Few of these landmasses have names. Most notable is the small, desolate collection of boulders known as Vesper's Rock. As the Rock is near Gorgossium and small enough not to be obvious, it is used by Christopher Carrion to perform various magical acts away from the sight of Mater Motley. Another "rock of distinction" is Alice Point, a now defunct viewing station from which people were formerly able to catch glimpses of the Time Out of Time.

== Character histories ==
=== Candy Quackenbush ===
Candy Quackenbush is a teenage girl who is the main character in The Books of Abarat (2002–2011), and is partially based on Barker's former stepdaughter Nicole. The heroine of the series, she is a sixteen-year-old misfit (notably with heterochromia; her left eye is brown, while the right is blue) from Chickentown, a small township located in Minnesota. Chickentown is devoted to the chicken industry, which sickens Candy; and her teachers and peers mock her for this. In addition, her verbally and physically abusive father fails to understand her and is absorbed in his own misery after losing his job at the chicken factory. Her mother also fails to sympathise with her, and feels trapped in Chickentown with her alcoholic husband and three children. After a quarrel with her schoolteacher, Miss Schwartz, Candy leaves the classroom and enters a field of grass outside the town. Here, her encounter with John Mischief and his brothers begins the series of events which eventually leads her to the Islands of the Abarat, to whose future she becomes vital.

=== John Mischief ===
John Mischief and his seven brothers share a single body: that of Mischief, who has antlers on his head supporting seven smaller heads, each having its own personality. Their names are John Fillet, John Sallow, John Moot, John Drowze, John Pluckitt, John Serpent, and John Slop. Together, the eight of them are "master thieves", and as such are wanted for grand larceny on several Hours. They are the first Abaratians Candy meets. Later they join the search for the missing Finnegan Hob to escape the island of Yebba Dim Day.

=== The Fantomaya ===
The Fantomaya are three old women who dwell on Odom's Spire, the 25th Hour. They are Diamanda, an old wise-woman; Joephi, who appears subtly "feral"; and Mespa, who is dark-skinned and has eyes the color of the night sky. Little is known about them, other than the implication that they have the power and will to aid Candy in her inadvertent quest to save the Abarat from Christopher Carrion and his grandmother and the statement that they constantly study and protect the history of the universe. Diamanda is revealed eventually to have been an ordinary woman dwelling in Chickentown (then called "Murkitt" after her husband's ancestors), who left the human world and joined the sisterhood some time after her marriage. This may mean that the Fantomaya are mortals who have chosen their positions voluntarily and undergone change in the process. Diamanda's mortality is confirmed by her death on the isle of Efreet, where she is killed by the monster 'Sanguinius'.

=== Laguna Munn ===
An enchantress living under the island of Jibarish, on a smaller island of her own. She is consulted by Candy in the release of Princess Boa from the latter's mind, but having accomplished this release, drove Boa from the island. She is the mother of two sons, of whom she created one from the virtue and the other from the vice in her own psyche.

=== Princess Boa ===
Boa was the daughter of King Claus, who is implied to be the last ruler of the Islands of Day. Until her death, Princess Boa is said to have been the Abarat's hope for conciliation between Day and Night, the two warring factions of the Abarat. She was set to marry Finnegan Hob but was murdered on her wedding day by a dragon sent by Christopher Carrion, whose offer of marriage she had earlier rejected. Shortly after this event, the Fantomaya transferred her soul into the unborn Candy, giving her immense magical abilities. When released from Candy's mind, Boa attempts to use Candy's body to fuel reconstruction of her own; but fails in this, and instead turns to Jollo B'gog, Laguna Munn's younger son. Having reconstructed herself, Boa attempts rendezvous with Christopher Carrion; and failing that, with Finnegan Hob.

=== Christopher Carrion ===
Also known as the Prince of Midnight or the "Nightmare Man", Christopher Carrion is the chief villain of the first two books, but is later eclipsed in this by his grandmother, Thant Yeyla Carrion, hitherto his guardian. The latter once sewed his lips shut for saying the word "love", leaving distinctive scars. His nightmares take physical shape as serpentine creatures residing in a fishbowl-like tank surrounding his neck and the lower half of his face. Tubes attached to his skull allow the nightmares free passage from his mind to the bluish fluid which fills this tank. These nightmares are used to punish and torture others, and seem to respond intelligently to his commands. As is revealed over the course of the first and second books, he possesses a deep self-loathing and remorse over the way his temper drives him to evil and reckless actions, and in Absolute Midnight resolves to become a better person after realizing Princess Boa's true nature as an arrogant and malevolent schemer.

=== Thant Yeyla Carrion ===
Commonly known as Mater Motley or the Hag, Thant Yeyla is Christopher Carrion's paternal grandmother. She is immensely intelligent, and often knows of events occurring in Abarat before her grandson does. In addition to this she commands a cabal of seamstress-witches. She spends her time sewing stitchlings – animated figures of leather and cloth, filled with a substance known as Todo mud ("living mud" from the mines of Todo) – whereby to lay siege to the Islands of Day. Until the third book, she and Christopher were believed the only members of the Carrion clan to have survived the fire that destroyed their mansion on Pyon. In the second book, Mater Motley is revealed to have started the fire so that she might "save" Christopher and raise him alone. When he rejects her control, she attacks him and assumes dictatorship of Gorgossium. She is an ally of the 'Nephauree', a race of extraterrestrial beings desirous to "dictate the nature of magic [until] the end of time".

=== Zephario Carrion ===
Son of Mater Motley, and father of Christopher Carrion, Zephario was titular head of the family until the fire on Pyon, wherein Zephario himself received severe deformities and injuries. Driven mad by the death of his children and the sorcery of his mother, he blinds himself and leaves Christopher to her care. He later lived as a tarot reader on the island of Idjit, until his readings led him to seek Candy and through her to reconcile with his son. He is a keeper of the Abarataraba, the story's supreme book of magic.

=== Finnegan Hob ===
The son of a Prince of Day and a witch from Speckle Frew, Finnegan was a young would-be hero engaged to marry Princess Boa, before she was killed at the altar by a dragon at Christopher Carrion's orders. Finnegan set out to interrogate the dragon's family, hoping to discover the truth behind the assassination; but later exterminated whole families of dragons in revenge for the loss of Boa. He is discovered by several former companions of his and persuaded to join their search to rescue Candy. He is described as a young man having dark skin, red hair, and green eyes; illustrations of him corroborate this and show the hair radiating around his face.

=== Malingo ===
Malingo is a geshrat: an orange-skinned humanoid with prehensile feet, four small horns on the top of his head, yellow eyes, and fan-shaped ears. He appears in the story as a slave to the magician Kaspar Wolfswinkel, who beats him daily, before Candy arrives on Ninnyhammer. He and Candy thereafter travel together until separation on Babilonium. Malingo later becomes captain of a ship crewed by Candy's allies. He is a skilled magician, though slow to reveal it, and this skill has rescued him on several occasions.

=== Kaspar Wolfswinkel ===
Wolfswinkel is a magician dwelling on the island of Ninnyhammer; formerly one of six magicians based on the Nonce before his vow of loyalty to Christopher Carrion, on whose orders Wolfswinkel murdered his colleagues. Because their magical powers were set into the hats they wore, Wolfswinkel must wear all these hats simultaneously when working magic. Wearing these hats, he is able to perform several feats of psychokinesis, including manipulation of objects, ignition of fires, and the creation of artificial life. Upon the removal of the hats, he loses control of his magic. Wolfswinkel is an alcoholic and is most often clad in a bright yellow suit. He is frequently made to seem ridiculous, both in person and as the villain of a play lampooning his fights with Candy Quackenbush, whom he attempted to give as a prisoner to Christopher Carrion. In the second book, Kaspar accompanies Carrion to the human world and reveals to Candy that she is the reincarnation of Princess Boa. Moments later, Kaspar goes into cardiac arrest and dies.

=== Rojo Pixler ===
Pixler is an entrepreneur living on the island of Pyon, which he purchased from Christopher Carrion. He is described as a small man with orange hair and suspicious eyes, and is shown in an illustration to have an orange mustache and goatee. He acquired Pyon and began its commercialisation after some time spent as a travelling peddler of toys; during this time, he purchased a triptych stolen by John Mischief that displayed an image of the entire Abarat as seen from above. It is suggested that he used this as a blueprint for his later plans, which include the transformation of Pyon and a similar transformation of the entire Abarat. At the time of the story, Pixler has, with the aid of various magicians and scientists, created a commercial empire and near-monopoly of the Abaratian economy, making his megacorporation one of the Abarat's greatest political figures and causing some characters to believe him a threat to social diversity. In Absolute Midnight, he investigates the resting place of the Requiax only to be possessed by its power and used as its emissary to the surface world.

=== Commexo Kid ===
Rojo Pixler's mascot, resembling a small, round-faced boy, created by Pixler in secret at Commexo City. He is captured by Mater Motley in the attack thereon.

=== Requiax ===
A mysterious life-form dwelling deep in the ocean surrounding the Abarat, wherein it is discovered by Rojo Pixler. Having encountered Pixler the Requiax takes control of his body, establishing telepathic communication with him in the process, and attacks Mater Motley when she invades Commexo City.

=== Jimothi Tarrie ===
Described in the second book as "the most humanoid of the tarries", Jimothi is the leader of the anthropomorphic felines known as "tarrie-cats", who live on Ninnyhammer. Jimothi is Candy's friend and a longtime, perhaps hereditary enemy of the forces of Gorgossium. He is described and portrayed as a human-sized, catlike creature with dark orange fur and luminous eyes, and an illustration shows him clad in a blue-green shirt. He is learned in the history and antiquity of the Abarat, and is therefore one of the figures who fear and distrust Rojo Pixler. Until the second book, wherein Ninnyhammer is overrun by Mater Motley, Jimothi and the other tarrie-cats prevent Kaspar Wolfswinkel from leaving the island and are therefore his constant source of frustration. In the first book, Jimothi assists Candy's escape from Carrion's bounty hunter, Otto Houlihan, by distracting him until Candy is out of reach. He is shown in the third book to be one of the Council of Hours, wherein he represents Ninnyhammer.

=== Legitimate Eddie ===
A stage-actor and former monster-hunter introduced in the second book, Eddie is the last surviving of three brothers who formerly made their career of hunting down the monstrous 'Ziaveign'. He is shown on Babilonium as a performer in the play parodying Candy and Malingo's escape from Kaspar Wolfswinkel, and later as a fighter on Candy's behalf during the voyage to Scoriae against Mater Motley.

=== Otto Houlihan ===
Otto Houlihan, called the "Criss-Cross Man", presumably on account of the checkered pattern marked on his cheek, is Christopher Carrion's bounty hunter. He pursues Candy and Malingo until the second book, wherein he is killed after Candy releases the beings called "Totemix" from the "Cabinet of Wonders" where they had been kept.

=== Filth the Munkee ===
Filth, introduced in the second book, is a primate-like creature described as "a monkey... with a distinctly human cast to his crooked face". He is said to have been jester to King Claus of Day until the death of Princess Boa and still lives in the Twilight Palace, where Candy encounters him after her escape from Otto Houlihan on the island of Babilonium. There, Filth reveals the history of Princess Boa and the existence of King Claus's "Cabinet of Wonders" to Candy. Later, he re-appears as a member of the Kalifee, the secret society designed to resist Mater Motley.

=== Prince Quiffin ===
The brother of Princess Boa, Quiffin is the Prince of Day and his sister's confidante until her death. He is known to have advised her in favour of marriage to Christopher Carrion.

=== Samuel Hastrim Klepp ===
This is the inherited name of the author of Klepp's Almenak, the travellers' guide to the Abarat published in Yebba Dim Day, Tazmagor, and two other cities. The Almenak's founder is Samuel the First, and its current publisher is Samuel the Fifth, who appears briefly in the first book and serves in part to reveal the history of the Abarat's interaction with the human world and some of its geography. Both are described essentially human in appearance, though the illustration of Samuel the Fifth may leave this unclear. He (Samuel the Fifth) is shown to be amiable and generous, though untidy, and outspoken against Rojo Pixler's operations. He does not appear in the second book except in relation to his ancestral publication, which is consulted by travellers throughout the Abarat.
