= Sapphique =

2008 novel by Catherine Fisher

- First edition paperback cover
- Author: Catherine Fisher
- Language: English
- Genre: Young adult, dystopian future, Science fiction
- Publisher: Hodder (UK); Dial Books (US)
- Publication date: 18 September 2008 (UK) 28 December 2010 (US)
- Publication place: United Kingdom United States
- Media type: Paperback, Hardcover
- Pages: 480
- ISBN: 978-0-340-89361-6
- Preceded by: Incarceron

Sapphique (/sæˈfiːk/ saf-EEK) is a young-adult fantasy and science fiction novel written by Catherine Fisher, first published in 2008 in the UK. It is the sequel to Incarceron and concludes the story of Finn's quest for freedom. Sapphique was released in the US in December, 2010.

Sapphique is also the name of the legendary prisoner who journeyed to escape from Incarceron.

== Plot summary ==
The setting of Sapphique is divided between two main locations: "The Realm", a place of artificial harmony, and "Incarceron", a microscopic prison that contains a vast world, all controlled and monitored by an artificial intelligence. There is little advanced technology in The Realm, as the rulers of The Realm set humanity back to the 17th century. Finn, who escaped from Incarceron, believes The Realm is little different from Incarceron.
The story starts off with Attia, who helped Finn while unable to escape herself. She acts as the assistant to a magician named the Dark Enchanter, whose real name is "Rix". She follows him on his tour before turning on him, leaving him to die, although he does survive. She originally became his assistant in order to acquire his glove, having previously belonged to Sapphique, the legendary Sapient who escaped from Incarceron. She then travels with Keiro, Finn's Oath Brother.
During this journey, the duo fight a twelve-headed monster. They are then summoned by the A.I. running Incarceron to go to a location that contains a humanoid shell for the A.I. While traveling to this location, they encounter a nursery that allows them to contact Finn. The A.I. wants to escape itself in order to see the stars. Doing so, however, will leave the millions of prisoners inside to die.
In The Realm, Finn is told by Claudia that he was originally Giles, a prince thought dead. He has flashes of memories but is unable to entirely remember. Following this, another person claims that they are Giles. The two are called before a council in order to determine who is actually Giles, where the council decides that the pretender is actually Giles and that Finn is to be executed for lying, despite Finn being the true Giles. The two engage in a duel, but Finn misses his stab for the imposter's heart.
Finn and Claudia run away to the wardenry, which acts as a portal into Incarceron. From within this room, the two fend off the army of the Queen. Jared, Claudia's mentor, meets the two in the wardenry, having nearly been killed by an assassination plot. Jared knows more about the portal than them and begins working on getting it working.
During this period, Rix, who survived his betrayal by Attia, takes on Keiro as an apprentice, after which Keiro reaches the humanoid shell. Rix attempts to kill Attia in revenge but is stopped by Keiro. Keiro decides to not give the glove to the A.I., putting it on himself. This results in Keiro trading places with Claudia, who is still in the wardenry. The A.I. running Incarceron recognizes Claudia as the Warden removed her from Incarceron so she could become Queen. Keiro, now on the outside, is caught in the middle of a battle.
The group captures Queen's son, forcing her to stop her assault. Some of the Queen's soldiers manage to get in by following a Steel Wolf, who act as the guards to the Warden. but fail to dislodge Finn and his group. The Realm is suddenly revealed to an illusion covering a decaying world following the machine that maintained the illusion losing power. Jared then takes the glove from Keiro and realizes that he was Sapphique. Jared, now Sapphique, opens a permanent portal between The Realm and Incarceron. Attia steps out of Incarceron through the portal for the first time and is awed by the stars. Finn and Sapphique then pledge to reform both the Realm and Incarceron.

== Inspiration and origins ==
Fisher said that as she was completing Incarceron, she knew that another book would be necessary to complete the story.

As I neared the end of Incarceron I realised there would be a sequel, but I didn’t think it would make a trilogy. A pair of books was something I hadn’t done before, so I was happy with that. Sapphique picks up a few months after the earlier book ends, and I can’t say too much about the plot without giving things away. But maybe escape is not the same thing as freedom, and inside the prison a crazy king claims to own Sapphique’s Glove, an object of great power that everyone, including the Prison itself, desperately wants. "Catherine Fisher". catherine-fisher.com.

== Setting ==
As with the previous novel, the book is set over two areas: Incarceron and The Realm.

=== Incarceron ===
Incarceron is a futuristic prison - a living building that tortures the inhabitants inside. Its futuristic technology oversees all the inmates inside through glowing, red eyes, and tortures them with the hope of escape, an unattainable goal only a legendary figure has attained. Initially, the intent of Incarceron's creators, the Sapienti, was to incarcerate all the criminals in the world and repair their morals to form a perfect society, controlled with the help of the Prison entity 'Incarceron'. The prisoners and Sapienti inside were sealed off from the world in order to control all variables in this experiment, with the exception of the prison Warden to oversee the project. However, after years of isolation and the failure of the perfect society, those inside have no way to seek help or escape when the Warden abandons the experiment's aims.

=== The Realm ===
The Sapienti created Incarceron during a time of advanced technology and discovery. However, since then, King Endor released a royal decree that Time would be "stopped" in order for humanity to survive, and now the Realm is trapped in the 17th century. The King justified that they were making a world "free from the anxiety of change". The Protocol prevents the development of science and evolution, and has since hindered Sapienti, and provided problems against freeing those in Incarceron.

== Characters ==
- Finn (Keiro's Oath-Brother) (Giles)
- Claudia Arlexa (Step-daughter of the Warden)
- John Arlex (Warden of Incarceron)
- Keiro (Finn's Oath-Brother)
- Attia
- Rix (Dark Enchanter)
- Jared (Sapphique)
- Queen Sia (Queen of the Realm)
- Incarceron (The living prison)
- Caspar (Sia's Son) (Earl of the Realm)

=== The Sapienti ===
The Sapienti are the learned people in the Realm and in Incarceron. Incarceron was created by the Sapienti. Several of the creators entered Incarceron with the intent of passing knowledge to the inhabitants and ensuring the success of the experiment. Outside of Incarceron, the Sapienti are greatly respected for their knowledge and often are allowed to breach protocol. They have a mother tongue, which only Sapients can speak. It is also the mother-tongue of the prison. They wear special robes to distinguish themselves from others. Within Incarceron, there are very few Sapienti remaining.

== Cover ==
The hardback cover shows an ornate golden keyhole. Through the keyhole, stars can be seen. This is a reference to Finn's escape from the prison to the outside world where he could see the stars. The paperback shows two golden swans attached by chains around their necks and decorated with diamonds.

== Critical reception ==
Reception so far has been mostly positive, although many reviews say that this sequel is not as good as its predecessor. One review said:

Fisher concludes her high-intensity, mind-bending duology in this sequel to Incarceron. She further explores themes of reality, illusion, and freedom without losing her intensely original world-building and authentic characters. The bittersweet conclusion fits perfectly...
