= Beng Spies =

American voice actor

- Occupation: Voice actor
- Years active: 2002–present

Beng Spies is an American voice actor.

== Roles ==
=== Television ===
Year	Title	Role	Notes
2002	What's New, Scooby-Doo?	Murph the Mechanic, Randy Dinwiddie	Episode: "It's Mean, It's Green, It's the Mystery Machine"
2004–2011	E! True Hollywood Story	Narrator	36 episodes

=== Video games ===
Year	Title	Role	Notes
2004	Xenosaga Episode II: Jenseits von Gut und Böse	Canaan, U-TIC Soldiers	English Dub
2004	Medal of Honor: Pacific Assault		Credited as Ben Spies
2004	Full Spectrum Warrior	Silverman	Credited as Ben Spies
2005	Area 51	Lt. Chew	
2006	Champions: Return to Arms		
2006	Baten Kaitos Origins	Gibari	English Dub
2006	Full Spectrum Warrior: Ten Hammers		
2006	God Hand	Gene / Villagers	English Dub
2006	Scooby-Doo! Who's Watching Who?	Dr. Scott O'Mulligan	Credited as Ben Spies
2006	The Sopranos: Road to Respect		
2007	Command & Conquer 3: Tiberium Wars		
2008	Command & Conquer 3: Kane's Wrath		
2008	Metal Gear Solid 4: Guns of the Patriots	Johnny 'Akiba' Sasaki	
2008	Rise of the Argonauts		
2009	Tom Clancy's H.A.W.X		
2010	Lost Planet 2	Additional voices	
