= Days of Magic, Nights of War =

2004 fantasy novel by Clive Barker

- First edition
- Author: Clive Barker
- Illustrator: Clive Barker
- Cover artist: Clive Barker
- Language: English
- Series: Abarat
- Genre: Fantasy; Young adult fiction
- Publisher: Joanna Cotler Books / HarperCollins
- Publication date: 21 September 2004
- Publication place: United States
- Media type: Print (hardcover)
- Pages: 512
- ISBN: 978-0-06-029170-9
- OCLC: 54205854
- Dewey Decimal: [Fic] 22
- LC Class: PZ7.B25046 Day 2004
- Preceded by: Abarat
- Followed by: Absolute Midnight

Days of Magic, Nights of War, also published as Abarat: Days of Magic, Nights of War, is a 2004 fantasy novel written and illustrated by British author Clive Barker. It is the second novel in Barker's Abarat series, following Abarat (2002) and preceding Absolute Midnight (2011).

The novel continues the story of Candy Quackenbush, a teenager from Chickentown, Minnesota, who has entered the archipelago of Abarat, a fantastical world in which most islands correspond to a different hour of the day. As Candy discovers that she possesses unexplained magical abilities, Christopher Carrion, ruler of the island of Midnight, prepares for war against the forces of Day.

Like the first novel in the series, Days of Magic, Nights of War is extensively illustrated with paintings by Barker. The book won the 2004 Bram Stoker Award for Best Work for Young Readers, tying with Steve Burt's Oddest Yet.

== Plot ==
Following the events of Abarat, Candy Quackenbush travels through the islands of Abarat with her Geshrat companion Malingo while attempting to evade bounty hunter Otto Houlihan. Candy begins to manifest magical abilities and gradually discovers that her connection to Abarat is much deeper than she had previously believed.

Meanwhile, Christopher Carrion, the Lord of Midnight, prepares to impose permanent darkness across the archipelago. He breeds creatures known as Sacbrood and plans to use them as part of an assault that will allow the monstrous Requiax to emerge from beneath the Sea of Izabella.

Candy and Malingo are separated while visiting the carnival island of Babilonium. Malingo joins several of Candy's allies, who seek the missing adventurer Finnegan Hob, formerly betrothed to Princess Boa. Candy is eventually captured and taken to Carrion's stronghold.

In Chickentown, events in Abarat begin to affect the human world. The spirits of Diamanda and her husband Henry attempt to prepare the town for a convergence between the two worlds.

Candy's companions rescue her, but she subsequently learns that Princess Boa's soul was magically placed within her by the Fantomaya. The revelation places Candy at the centre of the struggle over Abarat's future. Carrion confronts his grandmother, Mater Motley, after discovering that she concealed the truth about Candy from him, and is badly wounded.

Following the confrontation, Mater Motley takes control of Gorgossium and begins consolidating her power, setting the stage for the events of Absolute Midnight.

== Background and publication ==
Days of Magic, Nights of War was published by Joanna Cotler Books, an imprint of HarperCollins, in September 2004. Publishers Weekly described it prior to publication as a continuation of the adventures begun in Abarat.

Barker wrote and illustrated the novel. The first American hardcover edition contains numerous full-colour paintings integrated into the narrative, continuing the visual approach established in the first Abarat volume.

The first edition was published with the ISBN 0-06-029170-2 and was catalogued by the Library of Congress as the second volume of the Abarat series.

== Reception ==
Kirkus Reviews described the novel as more plot-driven than its predecessor and praised the climax as large-scale and cinematic, while criticising some of the characterisation and Barker's tendency to explain emotional responses rather than allow them to emerge from the narrative. The review nevertheless predicted strong demand for the sequel and highlighted the book's elaborate fantasy imagery and Barker's illustrations.

The novel was recognised by several genre awards. It tied with Steve Burt's Oddest Yet for the 2004 Bram Stoker Award for Best Work for Young Readers. It was also nominated for the 2005 British Fantasy Award for best novel, then known as the August Derleth Award.

In the 2005 Locus Award poll, Days of Magic, Nights of War placed fifth in the young-adult book category.

== Awards and nominations ==
Year	Award	Category	Result
2004	Bram Stoker Awards	Work for Young Readers	Won (tie)
2005	British Fantasy Awards	August Derleth Award	Nominated
2005	Locus Award	Young Adult Book	5th place
