= Shion Uzuki =

- Xenosaga character
- Shion as she appears in Xenosaga Episode III
- First game: Xenosaga Episode I: Der Wille zur Macht
- Created by: Tetsuya Takahashi
- Voiced by: English: Olivia Hack (Episode II) Lia Sargent (Episode I, Episode III); Japanese: Ai Maeda

Shion Uzuki (シオン・ウヅキ, Shion Uzuki) is the main protagonist of the Xenosaga trilogy for the PlayStation 2. In addition, she was in the DS game Xenosaga I & II, Xenosaga Freaks, as well as the anime Xenosaga: The Animation.

== Character design ==
Shion Uzuki is the main character of the three episodes of Xenosaga, which have been referred to as "Shion's Arc" by Namco Bandai. While her role is less prominent in Xenosaga Episode II, which focuses on the character Jr., she is the lead character again in the DS remake Xenosaga I & II. While Shion's surname is "Uzuki", Takahashi has stated that she is not meant to be a distant relative of the character Citan Uzuki from Xenogears. She does, however, share his liking for science.

Shion is portrayed as a girl who tries to overcome the tragic events of her past by "looking away from reality and truth". Takahashi compared the character's instinctive tendency to run away from things with his very own personality and mindset. A particular point he wanted to explore in the series was Shion "looking back at herself […] wondering how she should live her life". When he created Xenosaga, Takahashi made "life and death" a central theme of the story and gave each character a different outlook on it; Shion and Albedo were conceived as the two characters that eventually develop the "ideal compromise towards death".

Xenosaga Episode I has an anime-like art style, while Episode II and III use a more realistic style, and thus she appears differently. She wears glasses in the first and third games. If the player loads a save file from Episode II in Episode III, Shion will obtain special armor that will change her outward appearance.

Shion's main theme in Episode I is the ending song "Kokoro"(heart) performed by Joanne Hogg. The tracks "Shion's Crisis", "Shion ~Memories of the Past~" and "Shion ~Emotion~" were also written for scenes focusing on her. "Fighting KOS-MOS" plays during a scene that showcases KOS-MOS' power, but composer Yasunori Mitsuda chose to write the track from Shion's perspective for a twist. "Shion ~Emotion~" was first released on the "Kokoro" maxi-single as "Kokoro Piano Version", but Mitsuda changed the track's title in the Xenosaga Original Soundtrack as it fitted Shion best.

== Appearances ==
=== Xenosaga ===
Shion Uzuki was assigned to Vector Industries' First R&D Division at the young age of 18 in T.C. 4763. Her official title is "Chief Engineer of the KOS-MOS Project General Operation System Research Center, Vector Industries First R&D Division". She has a bright, cheerful personality and is ever the optimist, perhaps to hide the scars of losing both her parents as a child and her fiancé two years ago. In Episode I, it was revealed that she suffers from astraphobia, the result of two traumatic incidents which happened during lightning storms; losing her parents and later her fiancé, Kevin. She does not get along well with her brother, Jin Uzuki, who is thirteen years her senior. Shion ends up being swept, along with KOS-MOS and her co-worker Allen Ridgeley, into a conspiracy concerning the very fate of mankind itself.

In addition to her intellect (a key factor in her usage of nanotechnology), she learned the same martial arts that Jin and Margulis are masters of as taught by her grandfather. However, unlike Jin and Margulis, she primarily focuses on hand-to-hand combat with the use of her M.W.S.

Throughout the series, Shion has exhibited abilities unbecoming of most humans. During the Gnosis' assault on the Woglinde, she was caught near an FAE (fuel air explosion), which no ordinary human could possibly survive. Shion, however, was blown back by the explosion and left otherwise unscathed. Shion has also demonstrated the peculiar ability to hear the Song of Nephilim, something which only Realians and U.R.T.V.s should be capable of (chaos has also demonstrated this ability, but his status as a "human being" remains ambiguous at best). During a Gnosis assault on the Woglinde, Shion was caught by a Gnosis in its immaterial state, which was able to grip her. She was able to escape crystallization and mysteriously avoided the fate of those who did not survive such an encounter with a Gnosis, as those that come into physical contact with Gnosis usually transformed into one. Andrew Cherenkov, for instance, suffered such a fate. This could be due to her status as the "Maiden" or her possession of what Wilhelm referred to as the "Shining Will", which is a prerequisite to becoming a Testament; it is said that those with the Shining Will will not Gnosify.

Shion can link to U-DO and can communicate with it, with U-DO responding to her through this power. During the Miltian Conflict (as a child), after seeing her parents killed by berserk realians she summons the Gnosis from her distress through the Zohar. When she once again experiences this as an adult she loses control and summons Abel’s Ark (a giant Gnosis). Shion also suffers from the same illness as her mother, which Kevin reveals is caused by communication with U-DO. Kevin confirms in Episode III that KOS-MOS is gradually killing Shion since KOS-MOS uses the Zohar and U-DO as an energy source. Had U-DO not chosen to let humanity live on, Shion would have ultimately died due to the extreme stress caused by these communications.

She has also experienced several unusual perceptions, seeing visions of the young girl named "Nephilim" and of her deceased Realian nanny Febronia. It is also revealed in Xenosaga I & II and the database of III that she has the natural ability to see into the "Realm of Imaginary Numbers", where the Gnosis hail from. Her glasses inhibit this ability and allow her to experience relatively normal perceptions. However, as this sense of hers is not active all the time, and as she "has gotten used to it," she removes the glasses when they present an inconvenience to her daily life.

Her consciousness has existed since the time of Lost Jerusalem as the maiden and close acquaintance of Mary Magdalene; her brief vision of the distant past was not through KOS-MOS' memory, but through her own. It can be deduced from KOS-MOS' last words that Shion's former self died as a result of being caught up in some larger occurrence and that KOS-MOS (Mary) had been unable to protect her.

After discovering Allen's feelings for her on Michtam, Shion took the first step towards her independence. Shion, so caught up in the memories shared with Kevin Winnicot, had not truly realized the extent of Allen's love for her. Because Allen differs from Kevin in every conceivable way, including attitude, disposition, and personal history, Shion felt as though he would be the one able to offer comfort for her sorrowful heart. Thus begins Shion's journey to Lost Jerusalem, wherein humanity's collective consciousness awaits guidance and salvation.

=== Other appearances ===
Shion makes an appearance in Namco × Capcom, when she, M.O.M.O., and KOS-MOS appear in the middle of Shibuya during a series of dimensional disturbances, in time to help the main characters against a Gnosis attack. In the game, Shion is paired with MOMO as a single unit. Bandai has released Shion figurines as part of the Xenosaga Legend toy set.

== Reception ==
Shion as seen in Xenosaga Episode I has been called "cute" and "likable" by critics. IGN also praised the more realistic character designs seen in Episode II, noting that Shion's design became "more flattering", having "been injected with ye old 'Babe Serum.'" RPGamer also praised the design change, though they felt that Shion's lack of glasses in that episode was "amusing". In a review of the first volume of Xenosaga: The Animation, GameSpot compared Shion and KOS-MOS to "the ultimate fanboy fan-service pair", feeling that Shion was an example of a "cute, yet smart glasses girl".

Personalitywise, Shion has been described by GameSpot as being "pretty straightforward as a heroine, though maybe a little ditzy for someone who's supposedly one of the best scientists in the galaxy". On the other hand, IGN felt that the character was "more complicated than she first lets on". In a review of the Xenosaga anime, another reviewer from IGN noted that Shion's idealism and naivety were out of place considering her tragic past, and that it was annoying "since it seems to happen a lot with anime heroines". GameSpy echoed this concern, stating that Shion was "often naïve to the point of unbelievability". On voice acting, GameSpy felt Shion in Episode I was "excellent" despite the game not having "Hollywood-quality" acting. The site called the character a "calm center" around which the rest of the game is built.
