= Catherine Fisher =

Welsh children's writer (born 1957)

- Born: 1957 (age 68–69); Newport, Wales
- Occupation: Author
- Writing career
- Period: 1990-present
- Genres: Young adult, science fiction, fantasy
- Website: catherine-fisher.com

Catherine Fisher (born 1957) is a poet and novelist for children and Young Adults. Best known for her internationally bestselling novel Incarceron and its sequel, Sapphique, she has published over 40 novels and 5 volumes of poetry. She has worked as an archaeologist, and as a school and university teacher, is an experienced broadcaster and adjudicator and has taught at the Arvon Foundation and Ty Newydd Writers' Centres. She lives in Wales, UK.

== Personal life ==
Fisher was born in Newport, in the Welsh county of Gwent. She graduated from the University of Wales with a degree in English Literature and Education.

== Work experience ==
Catherine Fisher has worked as a primary-school teacher and as an archaeologist. She also taught writing for children at the University of South Wales. She has been a full-time writer of fiction and poetry since 2002.

== Writing ==
Since the late 1980s, Fisher has been writing children's fantasy, both Young Adult and Middle Grade. These novels have been translated into over 30 languages, and many of her works have won or been shortlisted for literary awards. She has twice won the Welsh Books Council Tir na n'Og prize for fiction in English, with The Candle Man (2000) and The Clockwork Crow (2015). Her young adult fantasies Incarceron and Sapphique were New York Times bestsellers and Times Book of the Year. The Oracle, the first volume of a trilogy mixing Egyptian and Greek myth, was shortlisted for the Whitbread Prize. The Clockwork Crow, first of an acclaimed trilogy for middle grade, an enchanting reworking of Welsh fairylore and Victorian Gothic, was shortlisted for the Blue Peter Prize. Fisher's work mixes myth, legend and folktale, with vibrant characters and language that is precise and evocative. She has written several well-received re-tellings of Welsh myth and legend, including The Cat With Iron Claws, and Culhwch and Olwen.

In addition to her writing for children, Fisher has published four poetry collections with Seren Books: Immrama (1988), The Unexplored Ocean (c. 1994), Altered States (1999) and The Bramble King (2019). She has also published a pamphlet, Folklore (2003), with Smith/Doorstop Books, and many poems in magazines and anthologies, including Poetry Wales, Poetry Now, The Poetry Review and the Forward Book of Poetry. The collection Immrama won the Welsh Arts Council Young Writers' Prize in 1989. She won the Cardiff International Poetry Competition in the same year with her poem 'Marginalia'.

== Awards and honors ==
Awards for Fisher's writing
Year	Title	Award	Result	Ref.
1996	The Candle Man	Tir na n-Og Award for Best English-Language Book	Winner	
2003	The Oracle	Whitbread Children's Book Award	Shortlist	
2003	The Oracle	Bram Stoker Award for Best Work for Young Readers	Nominee	
2007	Corbenic	Mythopoeic Fantasy Award for Children's Literature	Winner	
2011	Incarceron	Mythopoeic Fantasy Award for Children's Literature	Finalist	
2019	The Clockwork Crow	Blue Peter Book Award	Nominee	
2019	The Clockwork Crow	Tir na n-Og Award for Best English-Language Book	Winner	

== Publications ==
=== Poetry ===
- Immrama (1988) Seren Books ISBN 1854110039
- The Unexplored Ocean (1994)Seren Books ISBN 185411106X
- Altered States (1999) Seren Books ISBN 1854112732
- Folklore (2003) Smith/Doorstop Books ISBN 1902382501
- The Bramble King (2019) Seren Books. ISBN 9781781725078

=== Prose ===
==== Standalone books ====
- The Conjuror's Game (1990) The Bodley Head ISBN 0370314123

The Conjuror's Game (1991) Red Fox ISBN 0099859602

- Fintan's Tower (1991) The Bodley Head ISBN 0370315979

Fintan's Tower (1992) Red Fox ISBN 0099935201

- Saint Tarvel's Bell (1992) Chivers Press ISBN 0862208998
- The Candle Man (1994.) The Bodley Head ISBN 0370318897

The Candle Man (1994) Red Fox ISBN 0099301393.

- The Hare And Other Stories (1994) Pont books
- Belin's Hill (1997) The Bodley Head ISBN 0370322711

Belin's Hill (1997) Red Fox ISBN 0099539810

- The Lammas Field (1999) Hodder Children's ISBN 0340736992
- Darkwater Hall (2000) Hodder Children's ISBN 0340743832
- Corbenic (2002) Red Fox ISBN 9780099438489
- Darkhenge (2005) The Bodley Head ISBN 0370328590
- The Weather Dress (2005) Pont Books ISBN 1843235935
- Crown of Acorns (May 2010) Hodder Children's Books. ISBN 9780340970072

==== The Snow-Walker trilogy ====
- The Snow-Walker's Son (1993) The Bodley Head ISBN 0370317963 Red Fox pb ISBN 9780099251927
- The Empty Hand (1995) The Bodley Head ISBN 0370323106 Red Fox pb ISBN 0099251825
- The Soul Thieves (1996) The Bodley Head ISBN 0370324900 Red Fox pb ISBN 0099539713

==== The Book of the Crow series ====
(US title: Relic Master series)

- The Relic Master Bodley Head 1998 ISBN 0-370-32426-9 Red Fox paperback 1998 ISBN 0099263939 (US title: The Dark City, 2011)
- The Interrex (1999) Bodley Head ISBN 0370324366 Red Fox paperback 2000 ISBN 0099263947 (US title: The Lost Heiress, 2011)
- Flain's Coronet (2000) Bodley Head ISBN 0370326024 Red Fox paperback ISBN 0-09-940306-4 (US title: The Hidden Coronet, 2011)
- The Margrave (2001) Red Fox paperback ISBN 0-09-940487-7 (US title: The Margrave, 2011)

==== The Oracle trilogy ====
- The Oracle Hodder Childrens 2003 ISBN 0340843764 ' (US title: The Oracle Betrayed Greenwillow Books, 2003)
- The Archon Hodder Childrens 2004 ISBN 0340843772 (US title: The Sphere of Secrets Greenwillow Books, 2004)
- The Scarab Hodder Childrens 2005 ISBN 0340878940(US title: Day of the Scarab, Greenwillow Books 2005)

==== Incarceron series ====
- Incarceron (2007) Hodder Childrens ISBN 9780340893609 2007 US Dial Penguin.
- Sapphique (2008) Hodder Childrens ISBN 9780340893616 2008 US Dial Penguin.

==== Chronoptika series ====
- Obsidian Mirror (2012) Hodder Childrens ISBN 9780340970089 US Dial Penguin
- The Box of Red Brocade (2013) Hodder Childrens ISBN 9781444912630 (US title: Slanted Worlds, 2013 Dial Penguin).
- The Door in the Moon (2015) Hodder Childrens ISBN 9781444912647 (2016 US Dial Penguin)
- The Speed of Darkness (2016) Hodder Childrens ISBN 9781444912647

The Clockwork Crow series

- The Clockwork Crow (2018) Firefly Press ISBN 978-1-910080-84-9
- The Velvet Fox (2019) Firefly Press ISBN 978-1-913102-08-1
- The Midnight Swan (2020) Firefly Press ISBN 978-1-913102-37-1
- Re-tellings.
- The Magic Thief (2010) Barrington Stoke.ISBN 9781842998212
- The Cat with Iron Claws. (2012) Pont Books. ISBN 9781848513174
- Culhwch and Olwen (2024) Graffeg Press ISBN 9781802586459

Short Stories.

The Red Gloves and Other Stories (2021) Firefly Press. ISBN 9781913102685
