= KOS-MOS =

Fictional character from Xenosaga series

- Xenosaga character
- KOS-MOS as she appears in Namco × Capcom
- First appearance: Xenosaga Episode I: Der Wille zur Macht (2002)
- Created by: Tetsuya Takahashi; Soraya Saga
- Designed by: Kouichi Mugitani; Kunihiko Tanaka
- Voiced by: English: Colleen O'Shaughnessey (Episode II) Bridget Hoffman (Episode I, III) Caitlin Thorburn (Xenoblade Chronicles 2); Japanese: Mariko Suzuki

KOS-MOS (Japanese: コスモス) (recursive acronym for Kosmos Obey Strategical Multiple Operation System) is a fictional character from the Xenosaga role-playing video game series by Monolith Soft and Bandai Namco Entertainment. KOS-MOS also appears as a major character in the anime Xenosaga: The Animation and in several crossover video games.

== Conception and design ==
KOS-MOS's various iterations. Archetype in particular was meant to inspire a "grotesque" feel due to the implied nudity and unnatural look

Created for the Xenosaga series by Monolith Soft, KOS-MOS was conceived by Tetsuya Takahashi. According to his wife and Xenosaga writer Soraya Saga, due to how they often depicted human characters in their works as "strong will in a fragile flesh and blood", KOS-MOS was meant to be the opposite, "the delicate pieces of soul in an unbreakable vessel". While she acknowledge she was unable to show the character's story fully within the games, she stated "I think it must be left veiled for now." When writing the game, religious themes were added due to Saga's "deep interest in the power of belief people have". Meanwhile the name KOS-MOS in part came from Takahashi's thoughts on Nietzsche's philosophy regarding the "will of power".

Her design was created by artists Kouichi Mugitani and Kunihiko Tanaka. Several of their designs went unused, however Mugitani would later recycle some of them for his own doujin work. Prior to Mugitani's involvement, the development team had tried to create her design "in-house". However, Takahashi was unsatisfied with the submitted work. When Mugitani was hired to create the mecha designs for the game, Takahashi asked him to also create a "robo girl in a bondage-type outfit". In Takahashi's eyes, while normally he would stand by his convictions, he instead felt KOS-MOS "should swing whichever way the wind was blowing" and wanted to aim for an extreme, even providing Mugatani with pictures of one of his favorite pornographic film actresses. While Mugatani designed her body, her head and face were designed by Tanaka. Tanaka, who was an artist for the Xenosaga project as a whole, not only created her face and headgear, but finalized the design as a whole. Upon seeing the earliest draft, Takahashi felt they have achieved the design he was after, particularly with the abdominal muscles he had given her.

Other influences for KOS-MOS' design, particularly her "Archetype" body, came from artist Hans Bellmer's doll creations, an artistic direction Takahashi wanted to maintain through her various iterations. Each iteration of KOS-MOS took into account criticisms towards the previous designs. Takahashi noted that while the "Ver. 4.0" design of her character is considered the most popular with fans, he himself felt it was the farthest away from the concept he had envisioned, as human influences had started to manifest in her appearance. Though he acknowledged it was created by the design team's consensus, he felt she was too "human-like", stating "A vessel is a vessel and shouldn't mean anything more than that, you shouldn't be fooled into thinking it's anything more than that." Mugatani on the other hand appreciated the artistic opportunities her mechanical design afforded, stating "For those of us who find the inner workings of the female body stimulating, KOS-MOS is a porn star [...] She shows us a beautiful structure of the human body in a different way from the grotesque, with a cool look on her face."

KOS-MOS's appearance in Xenoblade Chronicles 2 was designed by Tanaka. He wanted to keep the design similar to the original "Ver.1" appearance of the character, and something that would represent "Xenosaga" in the game as a whole. One significant change they did from previous versions of KOS-MOS was to have her main laser attack come from her visor instead of her chest at Takahashi's suggestion, and he added temporary "cat ears" to the sides of it to act as heat sinks. Originally he had considered giving her a "dress" of shorts around her shoulders and hips for a "Gravity Drive" attack, taking inspiration from magical girl anime Pretty Cure, but the development team felt it was excessive and he agreed. The finalized design was named "KOS-MOS Re:", as Tanaka intended it to be a refrain of Mugitani's work on the character.

== Appearances ==
KOS-MOS is an armored female android developed by the interstellar conglomerate, Vector Industries. She is made entirely of mechanical parts and nanomachines. She is programmed based on the tenets of logic, probability, and the completion of her assigned mission. However, threats to the physical safety of her co-creator, Shion Uzuki, cause KOS-MOS to temporarily ignore these parameters. She is equipped with a "Simulated Personality OS" to aid in communication, although she appears incapable of emotion.

KOS-MOS has significant powers believed to be superior to all other party members. In addition to superhuman strength and speed, the nanomachines her body is formed from allow her to morph parts of her body (specifically her arms) into various energy projectile and melee weapons. Her body is also able to self-repair and is very durable though not indestructible, and she is also protected by a force shield. She also possesses the ability to summon weapons such as the F-GSHOT chainguns and her famous F-SCYTHE and equipment from another location via U.M.N. transport. She also has a long-range sensory array, the D.S.S.S. system, and CPU that exceeds even those possessed by Observational Realians. She also possesses a Hilbert Effect projector whose power is thousands of times greater than that achieved by even the largest spaceships.

KOS-MOS possesses several black box components left behind by Kevin Winnicot. Each of these black box features is found in each of her skeletons, Version 1, Version 2, Version 3 and Version 4. One of these is her potent X-BUSTER weapon, a powerful burst of energy beams from her abdomen that absorbs the Gnosis. Others are related to her "simulated personality" OS and her self-awareness. KOS-MOS also has some form of energy manipulation tied to the Zohar. KOS-MOS has another weapon system called the "Tertiary Weapon System", which is seen periodically throughout the series. They consist of a set of energy wings, a pair of energy cannons and other attachments meant to be fitted onto her. While she is programmed to protect Vector personnel unconditionally, her highest priority is to protect Shion specifically.

An almost human alternate persona tends to come out from time to time in the form of a blue-eyed KOS-MOS. This blue-eyed KOS-MOS is far more powerful than red-eyed KOS-MOS and talks in a more empathetic human-sounding voice. This alternate KOS-MOS is in fact KOS-MOS' true personality that partially awakens at times when Shion is in extreme danger.

KOS-MOS has made several appearances outside of the Xenosaga series. She is one of many playable characters in the tactical role-playing game Namco × Capcom (2005), along with its successors Project X Zone (2012) and Project X Zone 2 (2015). She also appeared as a playable character in the role-playing game Super Robot Taisen OG Saga: Endless Frontier (2008) and its sequel Super Robot Taisen OG Saga: Endless Frontier Exceed (2010). KOS-MOS makes a cameo appearance in the role-playing game Tales of Hearts (2008) as one of many supporting attack characters for the player. In a later Xeno series entry, Xenoblade Chronicles 2 (2017), KOS-MOS appears as one of the Rare Blades, an in-game anthropomorphic weapon obtainable via Core Crystals.

== Promotion and merchandise ==
Cosmetic accessories based on KOS-MOS have been added to a few video games. Soulcalibur III (2005) included items for its custom character creator to recreate her appearance. The PlayStation 3 version of Tales of Vesperia (2008) offered a KOS-MOS costume for the character Judith as downloadable content. Outside of games, numerous figures and figurines of KOS-MOS in various scales have been released in Japan, several of them produced by the company Bandai and cited as being in high demand. In 2013, Volks released a licensed 60 cm fashion doll of KOS-MOS Version 4, which was only available for purchase by a limited preorder.

One particular figure included with the limited edition release of Xenosaga: Episode II was of such poor quality that mockery of it went viral. Jokingly dubbed "Jashin MOK-KOS" or "Evil God MOK-KOS" by collectors, the name has since become synonymous within the figure collecting community with poorly made merchandise. Monolith themselves made a self-deprecating reference to the figure in another game, Baten Kaitos Origins, via a boss called "Wicked Gawd". Takahashi himself commented on the figure, noting that part of the problem was due to his vision of how the "Ver.2" KOS-MOS iteration the figure represented was meant to look, particularly due to his insistence to use a gel-like substance to simulate artificial muscles. While he didn't blame the sculptor, he did blame mass production and the limitations of such at the time, and his belief that Monolith at the time did not have a clear target audience or understand his "extremely obscure niches".

== Critical reception ==
Since her introduction, KOS-MOS was well received. The staff of UGO.com described her as "widely regarded as one of the most awesome characters to ever come out of Monolith's design department", praising her as single-handedly making the game a pleasure to play due to her "sheer badassitude". Matt Miller of Game Informer stated that "Amid the strange philosophical and religious overtones" of the series, KOS-MOS stood out as a character that "can't be forgotten", and appreciated the air of mystery around her. Alex Williams of DieHard GameFan described her as "easily one of the coolest characters I’ve seen", further describing her as a "bad ass" and praising the depth of her character. Charles de Clercq in his book Les Légendes Xenogears et Xenosaga: Monolithes brisés called her a "true muse", praising the effect of Namco's heavy marketing of her image and how it benefited the Xenosaga series' visibility, and stated that the series could not exist without "the image of KOS-MOS, for better or worse". Meanwhile, Stephen Harris of RPGFan praised the symmetry of her appearance and how well she stood out amongst the cast, though did concede that her "scantily clad android" design "will raise more than a few eyebrows the first time she struts her stuff on screen."

Robert Mejia in the book 100 Greatest Video Game Characters stated that while many characters in the Xenosaga franchise warranted discussion, KOS-MOS stood out due to how "she speaks to the question if a robot can have a soul". He further described her design and narrative as one of the "evolution of posthumanism" through her various changes across the series. Mejia enjoyed how as the series progressed, her dialogue became less robotic and more human, reflecting her own awakening consciousness, and despite being seen as antiquated in the Xenosaga universe due to being an android, she represented the pursuits of attempting to create life strictly from artificial intelligence. He further suggested her role in the story suggested that analytical and physical superiority does not make a better "human", as her adherence towards a purely logical mindset is impacted by the presence of the "soul" within her teaching her the value of a human life. He further added that through KOS-MOS' portrayal, it provided an argument that for "posthuman perfection is contingent upon being infected with human imperfection."

Andrew B.R. Elliott and Matthew Wilhelm Kapell in the book Playing with the Past saw her relationship with T-elos as an interpretation of Gnosticism, in particular describing the outcome as a "radical reinterpretation of Christian myth", with Mary Magdalene being the one resurrected in the future to protect the universe. Through this they felt it presented the Gnostic principle of rejecting a material body to strengthen one's soul. While KOS-MOS throughout the series had gradually developed a more thoughtful and caring personality, T-elos was represented by her passion, pride and anger, due to her biological components. Despite physically being closer to Mary due to these components, Mary embracing KOS-MOS displayed a desire to remain with a more calm and collected mind. They additionally praised how this conclusion reflected the series themes of connecting divinity with technological controls or devices.

RPGFan's Tyler Trosper considered her one of the most amazing women in roleplaying games, describing her as having "a legacy that outlives her games". He elaborated further by citing the large amount of merchandise and visibility Namco had provided to KOS-MOS, despite the abrupt end to her story. He additionally pointed out that while she fits the "stoic android learns how to be human" archetype commonly seen in science fiction, her journey through the games helped set her apart, and particularly emphasized how her emotions gave her greater power. Trosper also pointed out that her relationship with Shion could be interpreted in different ways, and was crucial in her character growth.
