= Abarat =

2002 young adult novel by Clive Barker

- First edition cover
- Author: Clive Barker
- Illustrator: Clive Barker
- Cover artist: Clive Barker
- Language: English
- Series: The Books of Abarat
- Genre: Fantasy novel
- Publisher: HarperCollins
- Publication date: 1 September 2002
- Publication place: United Kingdom
- Media type: Print (hardback & paperback)
- Pages: 418
- ISBN: 0-06-028092-1
- OCLC: 49001992
- Dewey Decimal: [Fic] 21
- LC Class: PZ7.B25046 Ab 2002
- Followed by: Days of Magic, Nights of War

Abarat (2002) is a fantasy novel written and illustrated by Clive Barker, the first in Barker's The Books of Abarat series. It is aimed primarily at young adults. The eponymous Abarat is a fictional archipelago which is the setting for the majority of the story.

The title image contains an ambigram, which may indicate that it is derived from the Russian word 'наоборот' commonly meaning 'the other way around'. The paintings in the book are done with oils. Barker had already completed 300 paintings before he started working on the first book. By most accounts, Barker realised early that the story he wanted to tell could not be contained in one book. The American Library Association picked Abarat as one of its Best Books for Young Adults.

== Plot ==
Abarat focuses on Candy Quackenbush, a teenage girl frustrated with her life in Chickentown, Minnesota. After an argument with her teacher over a school project and the doodling Candy has done in her school workbook, Candy leaves the school and goes to the edge of town, where she sees the remains of a lighthouse. She finds this incredibly strange because Chickentown is thousands of miles from the ocean.

She then encounters a master thief named John Mischief who looks human except for the antlers on his head. Mischief's seven brothers live on these horns, appearing only as heads. Because he is pursued by a sinister humanoid being named Mendelson Shape, Mischief sends Candy to light the lamp in the lighthouse, which summons an ocean known as the Sea of Izabella from a parallel world. Candy climbs the rotting lighthouse stairs while the brothers distract Shape. When she reaches the top, she finds an inverted pyramid with a cup on top. As Shape gets away from Mischief and his brothers and begins to climb the stairs, Candy searches for the ball that goes in the cup and will light the lamp. She finds it and is surprised to see it is covered in swirling lines exactly like the ones she doodled in her school book. After giving her a key to protect and extinguishing the light, Mischief and Candy ride the seas to Abarat. A group of creatures carry them to a nearby island where Candy is separated from him. On the island, Candy learns that the Abarat consists of twenty-five islands, each occupying a different hour of the day, and was formerly connected to Candy's world before the harbour's destruction by Abaratian authorities. Thereafter the story follows her adventures as she discovers the crises affecting the Abarat, and gains intimations that she may be destined to conclude these. The story also introduces her chief antagonists: the sorcerer known as Christopher Carrion, his grandmother Mater Motley, and the industrialist Rojo Pixler, all of whom seek to dominate the Abarat.

== Critical reception ==
=== Awards and nominations ===
In 2001, Abarat won the International Horror Guild Award in the "Graphic Narrative" category, and was nominated in 2002 for the Bram Stoker Award for Best Work for Young Readers. In 2003 it won 2nd place in the Locus Award for the Best Young Adult Book. The American Library Association picked Abarat as one of its Best Books for Young Adults.

=== Reviews ===
Publishers Weekly reviewed it as "the author's imagination runs wild as he conjures some striking imagery ("Dark threads of energy moved through her veins and leaped from her fingertips" says one of the three women in the opening scene) and cooks up a surreal stew of character portraits (rendered in bold colours and brushwork, they resemble some of Van Gogh's later work). But much of the novel feels like a wind-up for the books to follow and, after this rather unwieldy 400-page ride, readers may be disappointed by so many unresolved strands of the plot".

School Library Journal said "Barker is obviously more comfortable in the Abarat than he is in our more mundane world; the chapters that take place in Chickentown don't seem fully developed. Once Candy is safely in the fantastical realm, however, the story takes off. The rendering of the Abarat's locales, cultures, and mythology, combined with the author's own full-color illustrations and well-realized characters, allows readers to become quickly immersed in this beautiful and frightening world. In spite of a less-than-credible, almost preternatural calm in the face of the bizarre, Candy makes a fine protagonist, displaying strength, vulnerability, and a lack of the forced spunkiness displayed by some adventurous heroines. This first book in a series of four sets the stage nicely for what is sure to be a rollicking, epic ride".

== Proposed adaptations ==
Before the first book was published, Disney bought full rights to the series for $8 million, intending to produce a film series to rival Warner Bros.' Harry Potter series. There were also preliminary plans for theme parks based on the Babilonium island from the books.
