= Nancy Etchemendy =

American novelist

- Born: Nancy Elise Howell; February 19, 1952 (age 73); Reno, Nevada, U.S.
- Education: University of Nevada, Reno (BA); Clarion Workshop
- Genres: Science fiction; fantasy; horror fiction
- Notable awards: Bram Stoker Award (x3); Golden Duck Award (2001); International Horror Guild Award
- Spouse: John Etchemendy

Website
- www.etchemendy.com/index.htm

Nancy Elise Howell Etchemendy (born February 19, 1952) is an American writer of science fiction, fantasy, and horror including four children's novels.

== Life ==
Nancy Elise Howell was born in Reno, Nevada. Her novels, short fiction, and poetry have appeared regularly since 1980, both in the United States and abroad. Her work has earned a number of awards, including three Bram Stoker Awards (two for children's horror), a Golden Duck Award for excellence in children's science fiction, and an International Horror Guild Award. Her fourth novel, The Power of Un, a sci-fi thriller, was published by Front Street/ Cricket Books in March 2000. Cat in Glass and Other Tales of the Unnatural, her collection of short dark fantasy for young adults, was published in 2002, also by Front Street/ Cricket Books and appears on the ALA Best Books for Young Adults list for 2002. She holds a B.A. in Fine Arts and English Literature from the University of Nevada, Reno. She is a former officer of the Horror Writers Association, and currently serves on the board of the Clarion Foundation. She attended the Clarion Science Fiction and Fantasy Writers' Workshop in 1982 at Michigan State University in East Lansing, Michigan. She lives and works in Northern California and is married to John Etchemendy, former Provost of Stanford University.

== Bibliography ==
=== Novels ===
- The Watchers of Space (Avon Books, 1980), illustrated by Andrew Glass
- Stranger from the Stars (Avon, 1983), illus. Teje Etchemendy
- The Crystal City (Avon, 1985) – sequel to The Watchers
- The Power of UN (Cricket Books, 2000)
- IL POTERE DI UNDO
- Das große Weihnachtsbuch der Phantasie. ( Paperback).

=== Short fiction ===
Collections

- Etchemendy, Nancy (2002). Cat in glass. Cricket.

Short stories

Title	Year	First published	Reprinted/collected	Notes
Dave Dickel's historic interview with the father of the Hart Cart, transcribed and annotated by Debbie Jean Locust	2000	Etchemendy, Nancy (Jul 2000). "Dave Dickel's historic interview with the father of the Hart Cart, transcribed and annotated by Debbie Jean Locust". F&SF. 99 (1): 92–103.		
Demolition	2001	Etchemendy, Nancy (April 2001). "Demolition". F&SF. 100 (4): 77–98.		
Honey in the wound	2007			
