= Adam Howden =

English actor

- Born: 1 July
- Occupation: Actor
- Years active: 2005–present
- Agent(s): Brown, Simcocks and Andrews

Adam Howden (/ˈhaʊdən/; born 1 July) is an English actor who has worked in video games, television, theatre, film, and audiobooks.

In video games, Howden's most notable roles are as Shulk in the Xenoblade series, Anders in Dragon Age II, Tintin in The Adventures of Tintin: The Secret of the Unicorn, Pipin in Final Fantasy XIV, and Fenton Paddock in Lost Horizon. In television, he has most notably portrayed Steven Lilwall on the BBC One series New Tricks. Howden has also appeared in, written, and produced short films.

In theatre, Howden has most notably played Stu in a revival of Anthony Neilson's play Stitching at the House of Wolf, and Dickie Greenleaf for the play adaptation of Patricia Highsmith's The Talented Mr. Ripley at New Diorama Theatre, for the latter nominated for the 2016 Offie for Best Supporting Male.)

== Early life and education ==
Howden was fond of acting since his early school years. He chose the subject for his GCSE studies, then his A Levels at the Strode College in 1999. He studied Drama, Film Studies, and English Literature until his 2001 graduation.

Howden went on to audition at drama schools for further experience. Eventually, he was accepted at the Drama Centre, a location he appreciated for its welcoming atmosphere and its rich acting pedigree (e.g. Colin Firth, Michael Fassbender). He studied alongside other alumni such as Ryan Gage, Rolan Bell, Gwendoline Christie, Jodie McNee, and Joseph MacNab. Howden studied multiple acting techniques, including some involving his voice. He stated, "Working on your voice is very important in all areas of acting, not just voice-overs."

== Career ==
Following his 2005 graduation, Howden's first TV role was as a student during "Slow Bomb", the finale of the action series Ultimate Force. For that role, Howden took his breaks inside a trailer with Simon Lenagan, another guest-star. There, he discussed with Lenagan how he wanted to do voice-over, and Lenagan encouraged him to present his voice reel at Just Voices, a voice-over agency he had co-founded. Howden did so, which started his career in voice-overs, first doing commercials and corporate voice-overs. He moved on to video games, with additional voices in Dragon Age Origins and Dragon Age: Origins – Awakening, then as Fenton Paddock in Lost Horizon, a main role which Howden says he still has "a soft spot for".

=== BioWare games ===
His first roles in the video game industry were as a part of BioWare's Dragon Age franchise. He auditioned for Dragon Age: Origins at the voice studio Side UK, reading and obtaining a couple of roles. Directed by Caroline Livingstone, he recorded various voices such as the Ostagar prisoner, which Howden has said he was "quite fond of" and "the first time I'd ever seen myself as a computer sprite." For the Dragon Age: Origins – Awakening add-on, he voiced the Constable Aidan.

Howden's breakthrough came in 2011's Dragon Age 2 as Anders. Originally played by Greg Ellis in Dragon Age: Origins – Awakening, BioWare offered Howden the part when Ellis couldn't return for unspecified reasons. Howden recorded with the guidance of Caroline Livingstone, who advised him on Anders's progression, as voice actors do not receive a complete script for secrecy reasons, and checked over his voice tone. Howden listened to Greg Ellis's performance but "followed his instincts" and didn't copy it entirely, claiming that, due to narrative progression, the character "is written quite differently. He maintains a sense of humor but you learn so much more about him in DA2 and you see a much darker side to him."

Howden has stated that he is very proud to have been involved in those projects, praising their diverse storytelling opportunities and branching narration. He credits his role as Anders as a major factor in his rise in popularity, and has mentioned that it was the most frequent character fans asked him to pull out when meeting him. Concerning the controversy over Anders's actions in the game, Howden expressed his entire support for him, explaining that he was his actor and, as he learned at his acting lessons, actors must not judge their characters and must deal with their actions. On an episode of the MCMBuzz Podcast, Howden denounced the homophobia some fans exhibited over a gay romance storyline between Anders and Garrett Hawke, the hero of the game. Howden defended the storyline and denied the idea that playing a gay character was difficult for him, citing the fact that he has voiced gay characters before (e.g. Hanschen Rilow in Frank Wedekind's Spring Awakening).

=== Shulk (Xenoblade and Super Smash Bros) ===
After a successful November 2010 audition for an unidentified Nintendo role-playing game, Howden was offered the role of the protagonist, Shulk, in the English dub of Xenoblade Chronicles. Thus, his recording, helmed by Justin Villier at Side UK, happened over four straight weeks—as opposed to the Dragon Age and Tintin recordings, which occurred in separate stages set according to their productions' situations.

Howden's performance had to correspond to the character's design and the casting director's desires: a bold and intelligent young adult who slowly becomes more mature during his quest, with, as Howden was told, "a neutral English voice, not posh sounding, but should sound educated." So Howden applied a tone which, as he says, "is not completely different from my own voice, it's a variation of my own voice. How I was when I was 19, probably!" To ensure his acting corresponded well to Tetsuya Takahashi's intentions, he listened to the original Japanese performance by Shintarō Asanuma to match the emotion for each scene. The recording team worked with a translator and Nintendo producer to create a faithful localization of the storyline, adjusting the translation as issues arose. For instance, if a character's mouth animation didn't match with the voice actor's performance, the crew would either shorten or lengthen the dialogue while keeping fidelity with the original's intent. And if the crew had questions over certain lines or terms, the translator would help them.

Howden described it as "a philosophical game. It explores our place in the universe, do we really exist, God, do we make our own fate or are we on a set course, as well as love, revenge, and friendship." He stated that he was proud of Xenoblade and wished the game had gotten more recognition for its merits. His performance was applauded and the entire voice cast earned a "Best Vocal Ensemble in a Video Game" nomination in 2013 at the BTVA Video Game Voice Acting Award.

Howden has reprised his role as Shulk for Super Smash Bros. for Nintendo 3DS and Wii U (2014), the Challenge Battle downloadable content (DLC) for Xenoblade Chronicles 2 (2017), Super Smash Bros. Ultimate (2018), Xenoblade Chronicles: Future Connected (2020), and Xenoblade Chronicles 3: Future Redeemed (2023). He has also voiced other characters in the Xenoblade series, including the "Classic" Male Avatar in Xenoblade Chronicles X (2015), the Architect and Tantalese Knights in Xenoblade Chronicles 2 (2017), and the Nopon Archsage in the Challenge Battle DLC for Xenoblade Chronicles 3 (2022).

=== Tintin (The Adventures of Tintin: The Secret of the Unicorn) ===
When Side UK passed video game auditions for the hero's voice, Howden was excited at the idea of performing as Tintin, claiming to have been a fan of the comics from a young age. Although one audition employee expressed doubts that Howden would obtain the role, as the character is sixteen years old and Howden was in his late twenties, Howden obtained the role. This was his third time working with Phil Evans, who had voice-directed him on Lost Horizon and Star Wars: The Old Republic.

Howden described the game as a platformer inspired by Steven Spielberg and Peter Jackson's production, stating that "they've taken two of the Tintin books and combined them for the film, and the game sort of follows that story of the film, but will also go on other adventures as well, so that you can do other things." Unlike Xenoblade Chronicles and Dragon Age where he recorded alone in the booth, Howden performed alongside other actors this time. Among them was Lewis MacLeod, who Howden described as "just so confident and he can just do it. He just turns it on, he can change his voice, turn on a sixpence, and it's brilliant."

== Writing interests ==
Howden has expressed a love for writing stories, stating it's "a good way to stay sharp when I'm not acting." Among those projects came "Bin Men" and "Dogging", two 2011 comedic shorts he shot with Jamie Baughan, a Drama Centre colleague, and the director Sankar Jayaraman, who filmed him in 2010 on "Bubble Burst".

Howden has stated that he wishes to someday make a biographical film about his mother's family life in 1960s East Africa and play his grandfather. As he explains, "I've been told so many amazing stories of their time there and having visited there myself I want others to see what a beautiful place it is. It's all in my head, I just need to write the bugger."

== Stage work ==
List of roles in theatre plays
Year	Title	Role	Director	Company	Source
2001	Twelfth Night	Antonio	Andrew Harries	Bath Theatre Royal	
2002	Fathers and Sons	Arkady	John Bechizza	Drama Centre	
2003	Pains of Youth	Alt	Georgina Sowerby	Drama Centre	
2003	Le Cid	Le Cid	Marguerite Forsythe	Drama Centre	
2003	Artists & Admirers	'Arry Brown	Di Trevis	Drama Centre	
2004	Romeo and Juliet	Romeo	Jon Lee	Drama Centre	
2004	Mary Stuart	The Earl of Leicester	Annie Tyson	Drama Centre	
2005	The Duchess of Malfi	Pescara	Di Trevis	Drama Centre	
2005	Mephisto	Hendrik	James Kemp	Drama Centre	
2006	Spring Awakening	Hanschen Rilow	Aoife Smyth	Union Theatre, London	
2011	The Malcontent	Malevole	Rae McKen	Custom/Practice at White Bear Theatre	
2014	Richard III	Buckingham	Rae McKen	Custom/Practice at White Bear Theatre	
2015	Romeo and Juliet	Benvolio	Rachel Valentine Smith	The Faction	
2015	Joan of Arc	La Hire/Montgomery	Mark Leipacher & Rachel Valentine Smith	The Faction	
2015	The Talented Mr. Ripley	Dickie Greenleaf	Mark Leipacher	The Faction	
2015	Stitching	Stu	Pip Minnithorpe	House Of Wolf	
2017	Beautiful: The Carole King Musical	Donnie Kirshner	Marc Bruni	U.K. Tour Cast	

== Filmography ==
=== Film ===
==== Feature films ====
Year	Title	Role	Director	Source
2011	The Comedian	Adam	Tom Shkolnik	
2011	Scar Tissue	Rupert Drummond	Scott Michell	
2012	Delicious	Suited Man	Tammy Riley-Smith	

==== Short films ====
Year	Title	Role	Director	Notes	Source
2005	Dancing with Lucy	Harry	Laerke Vindhal		
2006	Toast	Dave	Aneta Challis		
2006	Dirty Work	Special Agent 1	Carl Allegard		
2007	The Death Certificate	Mark Samson	Carl Allegard		
2010	Bubble Burst	Philip Mann	Sankar Jayaraman		
2011	Bin Men	Junior Bin Man	Sankar Jayaraman	Also writer and producer	
2011	Dogging	Junior Doggie	Sankar Jayaraman	Also writer and producer	
2012	The New Start	Tommy	David Elliot		
2015	Towers	Evan	Azhur Saleem		

=== Television ===
List of live-action performances in television
Year	Title	Role	Episode(s)	Notes	Source
2005	Ultimate Force	Student	Ep.: "Slow Bomb" (Series 4, episode 5)		
2007	Holby City	Jason 'Bilf' Travers	Ep.: "Countdown" (Series 9, episode 37)		
2008-2009	New Tricks	Dr. Steven Lilwall	2 episodes: "Couldn't Organise One" (Series 5, episode 5) & "Death of a Timeshare Salesman" (Series 6, episode 5)		
2008	Doctors	Martin Rivers	Ep.: "The Ticking Clock" (Series 10, episode 32)		
2011	Whitechapel	Stuart	Third series role.	Howden's scenes were cut in the final edit.	
2012	Dark Matters: Twisted But True	Fred/Jack Parsons (rocket engineer)	Fred: "Pavlov's Children, Raining Aliens, Glow Girls" (Season 2, episode 12) / Jack Parsons (rocket engineer): "Magical Jet Propulsion, Missing Link Mystery, Typhoid Mary"(Season 2, episode 13)		
2013-2015	Doctors	Ben Hardwick	Ep.: "Crossing the Line" (Series 14, episode 220)		
2013-2015	Doctors	DC Gerrard Norcroft	Ep.: "Best Laid Plans" (Series 17, episode 126)		
2013	The Intern	Lawrence Wright	Ep.: "Jess, Will and Andy" (Series 1, episode 4)		
2023	Changing Ends	Waiter	Ep.: "Stud" (Series 1, episode 4)		

=== Video games ===
List of voice performances in video games
Year	Title	Role	Voice Director	Game Studio	Notes	Source
2009	Dragon Age: Origins	various roles (Ostagar Prisoner, Ostagar Officer, and Ostagar Soldier)	Caroline Livingstone	BioWare		
2010	Dragon Age: Origins – Awakening	various roles (Constable Aidan)	Caroline Livingstone	BioWare		
2010	Lost Horizon	Fenton Paddock	Phil Evans	Deep Silver		
2010	Fable III	various roles	Kate Saxon	Lionhead Studios		
2011	Dragon Age II	Anders and Brekker	Caroline Livingstone	BioWare		
2011	The Secret of the Unicorn	Tintin	Phil Evans	Ubisoft		
2011	Xenoblade Chronicles	Shulk, Zanza	Mark Healy	Monolith Soft		
2011	Star Wars: The Old Republic	various roles (Overseer Prithor, etc.)	Phil Evans	LucasArts, BioWare		
2012	Inazuma Eleven 2	various roles (Prime Minister Stuart Vanguard, team members)	Mark Healy	Nintendo		
2013	Soul Sacrifice	Player Character Male	Kate Saxon	Sony		
2013	Soul Sacrifice Delta	Player Voice	Side UK	Sony		
2013	Company of Heroes 2: The British Forces	Tommy Atkins	Side UK	Sega & Relic Entertainment		
2014	Super Smash Bros. for Nintendo 3DS / Wii U	Shulk	Justin Villiers	Nintendo		
2014	Assassin's Creed Unity	various roles (Le Peletier, etc.)	Justin Villiers	Ubisoft		
2015	Final Fantasy XIV: Heavensward	Pipin Tarupin, various roles	Matt Delamere	Square Enix		
2015	Xenoblade Chronicles X	Male Avatar (Classic)	Mark Healy & Justin Villiers	Monolith Soft		
2015	XCOM 2	UK Soldier		Firaxis Games		
2016	Battlefleet Gothic: Armada	Solar Admiral Spire	Side UK	Sony		
2016	Battlefield 1	Pilot, various roles	Justin Villiers	EA DICE		
2016	FIFA 17	various roles	Aaron McHardy	EA Canada		
2016	Horizon Zero Dawn	various roles	Jo Green	Guerrilla Games, Sony		
2017	Final Fantasy XIV: Stormblood	Pipin Tarupin	Matt Delamere	Square Enix		
2017	Xenoblade Chronicles 2	The Architect, Tantalese Knights, Shulk	Jimmy Livingstone & Matt Roberts	Monolith Soft	Shulk via Challenge Battle DLC	
2018	Ni no Kuni II: Revenant Kingdom	Leander	Mark Healy	Level-5		
2018	Super Smash Bros. Ultimate	Shulk	Mark Healy	Nintendo	Voice clips recycled from 3DS / Wii U, briefly reprised role in Pyra and Mythra's reveal trailer	
2019	Trials Rising	Male Player		Ubisoft		
2019	Final Fantasy XIV: Shadowbringers	Thaffe		Square Enix		
2020	Xenoblade Chronicles: Definitive Edition	Shulk, Zanza	Jimmy Livingstone	Monolith Soft	English dub, includes new "Future Connected" epilogue	
2021	Final Fantasy XIV: Endwalker	A-Ruhn-Senna	Jason Baughan	Square Enix		
2022	Lego Star Wars: The Skywalker Saga	various roles		Traveller's Tales		
2022	Xenoblade Chronicles 3	Nopon Archsage	Jimmy Livingstone, Mark Healy, Rosie Jones	Monolith Soft	Challenge Battle DLC	
2023	Xenoblade Chronicles 3: Future Redeemed	Shulk	Jimmy Livingstone	Monolith Soft		
2023	Blasphemous 2	The Witness	Roni Yosko	The Game Kitchen		
2024	Metaphor: ReFantazio	Roger Ward		Studio Zero		
2025	Final Fantasy XIV: Dawntrail	Eald'narche		Square Enix	Echoes of Vana'diel Alliance Raid	

=== Audiobooks ===
List of voice performances
Year	Author	Title	Publisher	Award	Source
2012	Susanne Saville	Wicked Beloved	Ignition Studios		
