= Anders (Dragon Age) =

- Dragon Age character
- Anders as he appears in Dragon Age II (2011)
- First appearance: Dragon Age: Origins – Awakening (2010)
- Voiced by: Greg Ellis (Awakening); Adam Howden (Dragon Age II)

In-universe information
- Home: Ferelden
- Class: Mage
- Specialization: Spirit Healer

Anders is a fictional character in BioWare's Dragon Age franchise. The character made his debut in Dragon Age: Origins – Awakening as a human mage pursued by members of the Templar Order, the military arm of the Chantry, which is the dominant religious organization in the Dragon Age series. He joins the player character as a party member. He appears again as a companion character in 2011's Dragon Age II.

Although the character is initially depicted in Origins – Awakening to be only concerned about his own personal freedom, by Dragon Age II he has developed a zealous passion to help other mages who are oppressed by the Chantry. He later reveals to Hawke, the player character of the second game, that he has allowed himself to be possessed by a spirit prior to his relocation to Kirkwall, whose rigid belief in moral absolutes influenced his predominantly lighthearted and carefree disposition. Anders later orchestrates the destruction of the Kirkwall Chantry; with his actions, the Circles of Magi across Thedas began to rebel against the Templar Order and the Chantry, leading to all-out conflict across the regions of Thedas which later led to the Mage-Templar War in Dragon Age: Inquisition.

Anders' depiction in Dragon Age II has proven divisive among video game journalists and fans. Some found merit and nuance in his changed personality and antagonism against the templars, while others have disapproved of his darker characterization and suggested that his fanaticism lacked depth. His overt flirtation with Hawke, specifically a male player character, generated controversy as well as substantial discussion on the issue of LGBT themes in the Dragon Age series.

== Character overview ==
Anders is a wise-cracking human apostate mage who has escaped the Circle of Magi multiple times, only to be captured and brought back by the templars. Born and raised in Ferelden, his father was originally from the Anderfels, a kingdom in northwestern Thedas. He was brought to the Circle of Magi at Ferelden's Kinloch Hold after his magical powers manifested when he turned twelve. Anders initially refused to speak when he arrived there, not even to tell other apprentices his name. They began calling him "the Ander", referring to his Anders heritage; "Anders" would become the only name he'd use for the rest of his life. Having known friends, a loving family, and a life free of constant supervision during his childhood, the young mage was keenly aware of what he'd lost and constantly rebelled against the Circle's rules and restrictions, and eventually the very structure of the Circle itself. In Dragon Age II, Anders is depicted as very compassionate and eager to help the downtrodden, and he detests Kirkwall's Templar Order for their treatment of the local mages. Anders has an affinity for cats, and kept a stray kitten he found in the Vigil's Keep whom he named "Ser Pounce-a-lot".

Anders is a potential romance option for Hawke of either gender, whom he will usually develop feelings for even if the player do not flirt with him first. Unlike other companions in Dragon Age II, Anders is noted for being aggressive and proactive in his romantic pursuit for Hawke, who may respond by allowing or firmly rejecting any further flirtation. Rejecting his advances will yield rivalry points, which may be interpreted by some players as a measurable consequence on the avatar-NPC relationship, even though high rivalry scores unlock bonuses that can't be obtained through a friendship path and inspire companion loyalty just as effectively as high friendship scores. In Origins – Awakening, Anders presents himself as heterosexual. If Hawke is male, Anders will reveal that he and Karl were once lovers; if Hawke is female, Anders will omit any mention of his romantic past with Karl.

== Creation and development ==
Jennifer Hepler, the writer for Anders in Dragon Age II, had intentionally written the character to be a polarizing figure, who would be deeply loved by some players and intensely despised by others. She drew inspiration from the "cursed romance" between Buffy Summers and Angel from Buffy the Vampire Slayer when writing the romance subplot for Anders and Hawke, noting that it was something Bioware had not done up until Dragon Age II.

Anders is voiced by Greg Ellis in Origins – Awakening, and by Adam Howden in Dragon Age II. Howden used his regular speaking voice for the role, with a slight "angsty" inflection. He did his voice recordings with Caroline Livingstone as the voice director. In preparation for the role, Howden also listened to Ellis' performance from Origins – Awakening, and he recognized that they both have a similar vocal quality. Noting that Anders had evolved from the previous installment where he was more carefree and easygoing, Howden explained that he went his own way with the character, as he "is written quite differently. He maintains a sense of humor but you learn so much more about him in DA2 and you see a much darker side to him."

Matt Rhodes, who is employed at Bioware as Art Director, uploaded unused concept art he completed during the development cycle of Dragon Age: Inquisition on his personal website, which depicts a disheveled Anders living in a cave as a hermit. Lead writer David Gaider also revealed in a Tumblr post that Anders wasn't always the character who was going to return from Awakening, and that it was originally set to be elven mage Velanna.

== Appearances ==
Anders is first encountered in Origins – Awakening fending off darkspawn on his own when the Warden-Commander arrives in the midst of an assault on Vigil's Keep, with several templars lying dead around him; Anders denies his culpability in the templars' demise. He revealed that he was in the midst of being taken back to the Ferelden Circle when darkspawn attacked Vigil's Keep, but offers to help repel the darkspawn attack. At the conclusion of the siege, the Warden-Commander has the option of conscripting him into the Grey Wardens in order to save him from the templars, who has accused him of murder. During this time he met Justice, a spirit from the metaphysical realm known as the Fade, who is stranded in the decomposing body of a dead Warden named Kristoff. The spirit struggled to understand the real world and its inhabitants, leading him to engage Anders in some in-depth discussions about the world's problems, and eventually about the plight of mages throughout Thedas. For his personal quest, he asks the Warden-Commander to help him find his phylactery, which allows the templars to trace his whereabouts, and destroy it.

Dragon Age II reveals that Anders becomes a Grey Warden and survives the events of Origins – Awakening regardless of the player's choices, but he deserted from the order not long afterwards. He also agreed to host Justice as his new vessel, transferring the spirit from Kristoff's corpse into his own body, and relocated to the city of Kirwall in order to help mages fight for freedom from the Chantry. Hawke first meets Anders after Varric directs them to seek out a Grey Warden who possesses knowledge of the Deep Roads. He is found at his clinic in Kirkwall's Darktown giving aid to refugees, healing them free of charge. He convinces Hawke to help rescue his friend Karl from the templars in return for maps of the Deep Roads, but finds that he has been rendered Tranquil, effectively a form of lobotomy which renders the victim unable to feel any emotions. It is then revealed that the spirit of Justice now manifests itself as a spirit of Vengeance, an unintentional side effect of Anders' anger and hatred towards the templars. As a result, Anders struggles to maintain control of his own body and mind, and is eventually driven to become a terrorist in the name of mage rights. During the climax of Act III, Anders destroys the Kirkwall Chantry, killing the Grand Cleric and several others. This in turn gives Knight Commander Meredith the opportunity to invoke the Rite of Annulment, an order to kill all the mages in the Kirkwall Circle, without official sanction from a Grand Cleric or the Divine. Hawke has the option of executing Anders for his crime, banishing him, or ordering him to fight and make amends. Each companion will react to how Hawke chooses to deal with Anders' fate in their own way, positive or negative. Meredith's actions in response to Anders' terrorist act sparked the Kirkwall Rebellion, which eventually escalates into the Mage-Templar War observed in Dragon Age: Inquisition, the sequel to Dragon Age II.

== Critical reception ==
Anders is a divisive character. Mattie Brice, writing for PopMatters, observed that Anders' actions intertwines anger and sympathy "in an uncomfortable knot", and that the general reception of his actions has been negative. Writing for Kotaku, Hayley Williams placed the character last on her 2015 list which ranked 51 companions from the Mass Effect and Dragon Age games. She complained that his "terrible characterization in Dragon Age II was only made worse by the fact that he was genuinely likable and interesting in his first appearance in Awakening", and insisted that there was no resemblance between the two iterations of the Anders character "aside from his odd feathery shoulders". John Walker from Rock, Paper, Shotgun contrasted the character's different characterization in Dragon Age II from his original appearance as "the formerly fantastically grumpy character from Awakenings", claiming "they emasculated him to become such a weedy drip". On the other hand, Ligman argued that Dragon Age II delivered "some of the strongest character-driven storytelling that we've seen out of a Bioware title" in spite of its limitations, noting that she would accept "poorer production values as a more than acceptable trade off" if she gets characters "even half as dynamic as Anders". PC Gamer's Chris Thursten empathized with Anders, appreciating the moments when his sense of humor "surfaces above the broody spirit of vengeance that inhabits him"; by contrast, "the final, tragic, explosive expression of his frustration at the treatment of mages" is considered a highlight by Thursten of Hawke's decade-long exploration of relationships with their companions in Kirkwall.

Gieson Cacho, in a 2011 post for Mercury News' arts and entertainment blog, was of the view that Anders is the most fascinating aspect of Dragon Age II with regards to "how he sets up the conflict that’s central to the game". Cacho drew a comparison to Quentin Tarantino’s Inglourious Basterds, drawing attention to the similarity between both works where the narrative "turns the table on our perceptions of moral and immoral acts" over the notion that "protagonists can act like terrorists in certain circumstances and be justified". Cacho concluded that while BioWare's approach is flawed as they glossed over the results of the player's actions if they choose to sympathize with Anders, he considered the developers' attempt to be "brave" as they "broach the subject better than Infinity Ward did with Call of Duty: Modern Warfare 2".

Some sources compared Anders to Alistair, noting a resemblance in physical appearance and personality traits between both characters. Natania Barron of Wired commented that she "settled" for Anders and most likely chose him as her character's romance option for Dragon Age II because he reminded her of Alistair on a superficial level.

During an interview with Red Carpet News TV at the London Comic Con MCM Expo in October 2012, Howden noted that Anders was the role he was most recognized for at the time, and that he was the most frequent character fans would ask him to make an impression of when meeting him in person.

=== Analysis ===
Brice provided an in-depth analysis of Anders' destruction of the Kirkwall Chantry and by extension, BioWare's statement on contemporary social issues. She suggests that a gut reaction shared by most players would be to reprimand Anders, with the notion that pushing back against violent oppressors until the oppressed themselves get violent. To compare mages to a contemporary social minority, Brice suggested, would lend a perspective which complicates the player's thinking of both Anders and social change. Brice concluded that what the game really compels the player to consider is whether "blowing up the Chantry is what’s necessary for the oppression to end", and that it is "a testament to the social relevance that games can have by its blurring of the players’ sense of right and wrong and by its translation of that new understanding into actual activism for issues that exist in reality".

Anders is cited as the most notable example of a character providing gendered responses in the Dragon Age series. Jessica Hylton interpreted this as Bioware's attempt to allow players to "use Anders' bisexuality to include LGBTQIA content or to eliminate it from their gameplay entirely", and suggested that BioWare attempted to overcompensate for the perceived discomfort with male-male romance in Origins by having Anders not only pursuing the player character aggressively, but also offering different versions of Anders' past relationship with Karl depending on the player character's gender. Evaluating that the relationship between Anders and Karl is not conditional but the revelation of its nature is contingent on the player character being female, Hylton called this approach "a strange way to hide homosexuality". Heather Alexandra, writing for Kotaku, notes that there is a clear parallel between real-world queer experiences and the narrative of Dragon Age II. They discuss how this illustrates how mainstream society of Thedas treats individuals born with magical talent, which led to Anders' path to violent revolution. Alexandra stressed that "it speaks volumes that Anders’ struggle, which borrows heavily from real world queer suffering to pack its emotional punch, requires that his gay lover die — perhaps even by Anders’ own hand". Kris Ligman from PopMatters noted that Anders makes multiple references within in-game dialog to the freeness of sexuality that he was used to in his youth, but in pursuing a romance with him, the player becomes keenly aware how closely the game's writing is in linking the gift of magical powers and sexuality".

=== Response from players on flirting ===
Some players have made open objections towards Anders' unsolicited expression of romantic interest in a male player character. In early 2011, shortly after the release of Dragon Age II, one player made a forum post on Bioware's then-active social forums expressing their distaste for unwanted homosexual advances. The post, which is now inaccessible after EA shut down Bioware's forums, criticized the game's diversity in romances, and asked for a much bigger focus on straight male gamers as well as an option to remove homosexual content. Gaider responded to the forum post by saying the game is designed for everyone, ending his note with saying that "the person who says that the only way to please them is to restrict options for others is, if you ask me, the one who deserves it least." Other notable examples include a Ctrl+Alt+Del comic strip which lampoons Anders' alleged seduction of an unaware Hawke, and an open petition from a self-described gay player which called for Gaider's dismissal from Bioware over what they perceived to be negative representations of openly gay individuals.

Greg Armstrong-Morris from Xtra was annoyed by what he perceived to be overreaction by some gamers due to their inability to cope with Anders' flirting, and sarcastically proposed that a Kinsey scale which allows players to determine their in-game avatars' sexual orientation should be introduced to keep everyone happy. Ligman observed that Anders does not retaliate with insulting remarks when a protagonist spurns his advances; noting that even "rivals in the game respect Hawke", she contrasted this to the misogynistic treatment women may experience in the real world when placed in the same situation. Queerty staff approved of the game's same sex romances and singled out a potential romance scene between Anders and a male Hawke as a highlight, but also questioned whether aspects of his characterization as a bisexual man could be misconstrued as a sexual predator trope. Similarly, Hylton stated that Anders is an example of a "problematic bisexual character" and that the game's presentation played into the trope as a result of his writers' approach towards male-to-male flirtation.

Reflecting on her writing work for Anders in the 2016 publication Women in Game Development: Breaking the Glass Level-Cap, Hepler expressed bemusement that some players objected more fervently to Anders proactively flirting with a male player character compared to him "murdering a nun in order to start a religious war", noting that the character "has probably succeeded in being the most controversial character in BioWare history" from her perspective.
