= Xenoblade Chronicles (video game) =

2010 video game

- Cover art, featuring the sword Monado in the foreground and the Mechonis, one of the two titans featured in the game, in the background
- Developer: Monolith Soft (Note: Produced by Nintendo Software Planning & Development. The New Nintendo 3DS port, titled Xenoblade Chronicles 3D, was developed by Monster Games. The Nintendo Switch enhanced version, titled Xenoblade Chronicles: Definitive Edition, Additional work, development support, and produced by Nintendo Entertainment Planning & Development.)
- Publisher: Nintendo
- Directors: Koh Kojima; Genki Yokota
- Producers: Shingo Kawabata; Takao Nakano
- Designer: Koh Kojima
- Programmer: Katsunori Itai
- Artist: Norihiro Takami
- Writers: Tetsuya Takahashi; Yuichiro Takeda; Yurie Hattori
- Composers: Manami Kiyota; ACE (Note: Music group consisting of Tomori Kudo and Hiroyo "CHiCO" Yamanaka); Kenji Hiramatsu; Yoko Shimomura; Yasunori Mitsuda
- Series: Xenoblade
- Platforms: Wii; New Nintendo 3DS; Nintendo Switch; Nintendo Switch 2
- Release: 10 June 2010: Wii; JP: 10 June 2010; EU: 19 August 2011; AU: 1 September 2011; NA: 6 April 2012; New Nintendo 3DS (Note: Released for the New Nintendo 3DS as Xenoblade Chronicles 3D.); JP/PAL: 2 April 2015; NA: 10 April 2015; Nintendo Switch (Note: Released for the Nintendo Switch as Xenoblade Chronicles: Definitive Edition.); WW: 29 May 2020; Nintendo Switch 2 (Note: Released for the Nintendo Switch 2 as Xenoblade Chronicles: Definitive Edition – Nintendo Switch 2 Edition.); WW: 9 June 2026
- Genre: Action role-playing
- Mode: Single-player

Xenoblade Chronicles (Note: Known in Japan as Xenoblade (Japanese: ゼノブレイド, Hepburn: Zenobureido)) is an action role-playing game developed by Monolith Soft and published by Nintendo for the Wii. Initially released in Japan in 2010, it was later released in the PAL regions in 2011 and in North America in 2012. A port for the New Nintendo 3DS was released in 2015. A remaster for the Nintendo Switch, titled Xenoblade Chronicles: Definitive Edition, was released in May 2020. The Switch version was ported to the Nintendo Switch 2 in 2026 as Xenoblade Chronicles: Definitive Edition – Nintendo Switch 2 Edition. Xenoblade Chronicles is the first entry in the Xenoblade series, a subseries which forms part of the larger Xeno metaseries. Although it lacks direct narrative connections to previous Xeno games, like them, it incorporates aesthetic and narrative elements from both fantasy and science fiction. The game features navigation through an open world split into zones, side-quests tied to party members' affinity, and a real-time action-based battle system which incorporates Shulk's ability to see brief glimpses of the future.

Xenoblade Chronicles takes place on the frozen bodies of two warring titans, the Bionis and the Mechonis. The people of the Bionis, including the human-like Homs, are at perpetual war with the Mechon, a mechanical race of the Mechonis. Key to the Homs' efforts in fighting against the Mechon is the Monado, a sword said to have once been wielded by the Bionis. During an attack on his colony, the main protagonist Shulk discovers his ability to wield the Monado and sets out on a quest for revenge with his best friend, Reyn, with others joining in as the game progresses.

The concept for Xenoblade Chronicles originated in June 2006, when the game's executive director and lead writer, Tetsuya Takahashi, visualized and constructed a model of two giant titans frozen in place, with people living on their bodies. Development began in 2007 under the title Monado: Beginning of the World, though it was eventually rebranded with its current title to honor Takahashi's previous work on the Xeno series. The script was worked on by Takahashi, anime writer Yuichiro Takeda, and Nintendo writer Yurie Hattori. The music was handled by six different composers, including first-timer and lead composer Manami Kiyota and industry veterans Yoko Shimomura and Yasunori Mitsuda, with the latter also writing the ending theme, "Beyond the Sky".

The game was announced in 2009 under its original title and released in Japan the following year. Despite releasing in Europe and in Oceania, its North American release remained unconfirmed until December 2011, when a fan campaign called Operation Rainfall drew attention to the game. Upon release, the game was critically acclaimed as one of the best recent role-playing games, while its New Nintendo 3DS port was praised for successfully re-creating the game in a portable form. It was particularly praised for its story, which critics called innovative and surprisingly complex, and was commercially successful in both Japan and the West. In the years since its release, it has been considered one of the best video games of all time. A spiritual successor by the same development team for the Wii U, Xenoblade Chronicles X, was released in April 2015. A sequel for the Nintendo Switch, Xenoblade Chronicles 2, was released in December 2017. A third entry, Xenoblade Chronicles 3, was released in July 2022, also on the Nintendo Switch.

== Gameplay ==
Shulk (middle) and Reyn on the Bionis' Leg. Xenoblade Chronicles features large, expansive environments that afford the player a high degree of freedom to explore.

Xenoblade Chronicles is an action role-playing video game (RPG), in which the player controls one character out of a party of three using the Wii Remote and Nunchuk or the Classic Controller. The game employs an open world design, where players can freely navigate seamlessly interconnected environments. The game has a day-and-night time cycle, which often affects in-game events, quests, enemy strength, and item availability: for instance, stronger enemy types appear at night. While time flows automatically and a day cycle repeats about every ten minutes in real time, players can adjust the in-game clock to the desired time at any point. Additionally, while the game is about exploration, areas called "Landmarks" aid in traversing the land by serving as warp points that allow the player to instantly return to that point at any time. The game also supports a "save anywhere" feature, where players can save at any point outside of battle. The game has a New Game+ mode, which maintains much of the player's progress from their initial playthrough into future playthroughs.

Exploration, quest completion, and item collection are large parts of the gameplay. The player is encouraged to explore the large environments, which generally allow them to visit whatever can be seen on the horizon. While exploring, the player can take on side quests from various non-player characters that inhabit the game's world, which commonly involve obtaining certain items or killing a certain number of enemy characters. When the necessary requirements are fulfilled, some quests are completed automatically without the player having to return to the quest giver. Item collection plays a role in the game in the form of the "Collectopaedia". Scattered across the game are glowing blue orbs, and upon collecting them, the player is awarded with a random item that they can add to the Collectopaedia; when a certain number are collected, the player is rewarded with new items. Aside from the Collectopaedia, ether crystals can be obtained from fallen enemies or ether crystal deposits, which are used in the "Gem Crafting" mini-game to craft gems that offer various benefits when equipped.

Many in-game systems affect the general flow of gameplay. The "Affinity" system tracks the relationships between characters and locations in the game. "Location Affinity" tracks the interpersonal relationships between the game's named characters and how they get along with one another, as well as a town's general perception of the player's controllable party. Completing quests can change perception of the characters and open up additional story sequences and quests. There is also "Party Affinity", which is the level of affection between each party member and ranges from indifference to love. Affinity between party members can be raised by having them participate in battle together, giving gifts, or using the "Heart-to-Heart" system. "Heart-to-Hearts" are intimate moments between two characters that show more of a character's personality, history, or thoughts, and can be initiated by having a certain level of Affinity between them. The Affinity system affects how characters work together in battle, as well as gem crafting. The game also has an extensive customization system, which includes changing the characters' outfits and weapons. These changes are directly reflected in the game, appearing in the field and during scripted cutscenes.

=== Battle system ===
A battle between Shulk (the player), Reyn, and Fiora against hostile wildlife in Xenoblade Chronicles

Xenoblade Chronicles has a real-time action-based battle system, where the player controls the current lead character in real-time, and party members will "auto-attack" when enemies enter their attack radius. Manually input attacks, called "Arts", may also be performed by the player, but in a limited fashion. Battle Arts are only available after a "cooldown" period that occurs after they are used, while character-specific "Talent Arts" become available after enough auto-attacks are executed. Both party members and enemies have a finite amount of health points, and attacks deplete this value. Combat is won when all enemies lose their HP, but is lost if the player character loses all their HP and is unable to be revived. Health may be restored by the player by using healing Arts in battle, and regenerates automatically outside of battle. Winning battles earns the player experience points, which allows the characters to grow stronger as they level up and learn new Arts. Arts for each character must be set by the player on their respective setup, called a "Battle Palette", outside of battle.

Several other systems are present which affect the flow of battle. The "Party Gauge" slowly fills as party members successfully land hits on enemies, and filling the gauge allows the player to perform a Chain Attack for extra damage. All party members have an "aggro ring" around them as well; it grows larger as a character performs more actions. Larger aggro rings lead enemies to focus their efforts on that respective character, leading to a strategic aspect of luring and diverting the attention of enemies. Each character has a "Tension" gauge, which represents their morale: at its highest point, characters have increased accuracy and a higher chance to deal critical hits. The game's "Vision" system, where the main character Shulk can see glimpses of enemies' future attacks, also factors into battles. With knowledge of an enemy's potentially dangerous attack, the player can prevent it from happening by alerting a teammate, allowing the player to activate one of their Arts, or by using an Art of their own to stop the attack. The Vision system is tied to the "Party" gauge, which is filled by boosting team morale, using Arts with special effects, and avoiding or dealing critical hits. The three-tiered gauge gradually depletes outside of battle, and one tier is needed to either revive characters or alert a teammate to a vision. When all three tiers are full, the party can execute a Chain Attack.

== Synopsis ==
=== Setting and characters ===
The setting of Xenoblade Chronicles originates from a world that was nothing but an endless ocean until two titans, the Bionis and the Mechonis, (Note: Respectively called the Kyoshin (巨神; lit. "Giant-God") and Kishin (機神; lit. "Machine-God") in the Japanese version.) came into existence and battled each other until only their frozen corpses remained. In the eons following their battle, they became the home for multiple forms of life. The Bionis is home to organic lifeforms, most prominently the humanoid Homs, who are virtually identical to humans in appearance and biology; the diminutive and furry Nopon; and the avian humanoid High Entia, whose lives span centuries. Conversely, the Mechonis is home to the mechanical humanoid Machina, whose lifespans span several millennia. Life forms emit a substance known as ether, which can be used both as a form of magic and as a source of fuel. The Monado – the namesake of Xenoblade – is a mystical ether-controlling sword that the Homs wield in the battle against the Mechonis, which grants visions of the future to its wielder when fully controlled.

The game's main character is Shulk, a young Homs mechanic who lives in Colony 9 on Bionis. During an attack on the Colony by Machina creations called Mechon, Shulk becomes the Monado's new wielder. During his journey, he is joined by Reyn, one of his childhood friends and a headstrong member of the Defence Force; Fiora, Shulk's childhood friend and love interest; Dunban, Fiora's brother and the Monado's previous wielder; Sharla, a medic and sniper from Colony 6; Melia Antiqua, a High Entia-Homs hybrid and princess of the High Entia; and Riki, a Nopon chosen as the hero of his village. Other important characters include Zanza, the god of the Bionis and the game's main antagonist; Lady Meyneth, the goddess of the Mechonis; Shulk's mentor Dickson; Mumkhar, a cowardly soldier who fought alongside Dunban and wished to wield the Monado for himself; Egil, the self-proclaimed leader of the Machina; and Alvis, a mysterious man who aids Shulk on his journey.

Xenoblade Chronicles: Definitive Edition adds a new storyline, Future Connected, which is set one year after the events of the main story and takes place on the Bionis's Shoulder, an area not explored in the original game. Future Connected follows Shulk, Melia, and Riki's daughter Nene and adopted son Kino as they seek to reclaim the High Entia city of Alcamoth. The story also prominently focuses on Melia's relationship with her half-sister Tyrea, who was a minor character in the main story.

=== Plot ===
The game's opening details events one year past, when Dickson, Dunban and Mumkhar were fighting a Mechon army and Mumkhar deserted them. In the process of defeating the Mechon, the Monado paralyzed Dunban's right arm. In the present, Shulk studies the Monado in Colony 9, where Dunban and Fiora live. A group of Mechon soon attack Colony 9 along with their leader, a special Faced Mechon called Metal Face. Dunban is injured when he attempts to use the Monado again, prompting Shulk to use it. He wields it with ease, and receives visions of the future from it. While the Mechon are driven back, Metal Face is immune to the Monado and seemingly kills Fiora before running out of energy and fleeing. Shulk sets out with Reyn to seek revenge and kill Metal Face, and soon Sharla, Dunban, Riki, and Melia join the party. After Shulk receives another vision, the group travels to the High Entia capital to gain entry to Prison Island. Along the way, Shulk meets Alvis, who shares his ability to wield the Monado. Upon gaining entry to Prison Island, they encounter Zanza, a giant being who is the Monado's creator and offers to improve it so that Shulk can destroy the Face Mechon, who are revealed to have Homs inside. Shulk accepts and Zanza improves the Monado, but during an attack on the capital Metal Face and another Mechon called Face Nemesis kill Zanza. In the ensuing battle, Face Nemesis is damaged to reveal an amnesiac Fiora controlling it.

Although he is initially disheartened, Shulk's comrades rally him and he sets out in pursuit of Metal Face and Fiora. During a peaceful encounter with Face Nemesis, Metal Face attacks the party and reveals himself to be Mumkhar. Egil, the leader of the Mechonis, intervenes and spirits Fiora away. On their way to the Mechonis, the party defeats Mumkhar, then faces off against Egil and Face Nemesis. After the fight, Shulk and Fiora are separated from the group, and during their time together Shulk learns that Fiora had been awake inside Face Nemesis, but another being was controlling her actions. Upon reuniting with the group, they meet a friendly Machina named Vanea, who reveals that the Bionis and Mechonis were initially at peace before the Bionis' god Zanza launched an unprovoked attack and possessed a friend of Egil, the giant who was imprisoned on Prison Island and killed. Since the battle a year ago, Egil had been working to infuse the Mechon with people from the Bionis to create Face units who would be impervious to the Monado. While going to face Egil, the other presence takes over Fiora and is revealed to be the Machina goddess Meyneth. They reach Egil as he reactivates the Mechonis and begins attacking the Bionis, seeking to prevent the Bionis from using its population as food and saving the Mechonis from another attack. Despite fighting him, Shulk manages to make him see that they both wish for a return to peace. Dickson appears and shoots Shulk, who Zanza, Dickson's master, was using as a vessel. Zanza reawakens and uses the Monado to destroy the Mechonis and steals Meyneth's Monado from Fiora's body before killing her. The party narrowly escapes with Shulk's body, with Egil sacrificing himself so they can escape.

In the aftermath of the Mechonis' destruction, pure-blooded High Entia begin transforming into Telethia, beings who exist to purge Bionis of life. While the party is initially helpless before the Telethia, Shulk awakens and manages to defeat a Telethia raid on Colony 6. Although Alvis is revealed to be a disciple of Zanza, Shulk believes there is more to him than he lets on. While making their way to Prison Island, they defeat a High Entia disciple named Lorithia, then Dickson. The party then travels to face Zanza, who declares the life of Bionis as his food and vessels and offers Shulk the chance to become his disciple. Shulk rejects the offer, and during the ensuing battle produces a new Monado. With the encouragement of Alvis, who is revealed to be the spirit of the Monado, Shulk kills Zanza. Alvis then shows Shulk Zanza's origins: both Zanza and Meyneth were originally human scientists working to create a bubble universe from the Earth, and Alvis was originally the artificial intelligence aboard the space station. However, the experiment ended in disaster, obliterating the universe and causing Zanza and Meyneth to be reborn as gods. After the new universe's birth, Zanza and Meyneth created life in their image, and Zanza created the cycle of the Bionis out of fear that he would eventually fade from existence as his creations forgot him and sought life beyond Bionis. Zanza then attacked the Mechonis, believing that Meyneth and the Machina had become insolent to him as a god and towards his vision of the world he created. With the current universe threatened with death, Alvis asks Shulk to remake the universe as its new god. Shulk declines and wishes for a world without gods, where everyone can decide their own fates. In the new universe, the survivors of Bionis and Mechonis build a new settlement and live peacefully together. Fiora is restored to her Homs form, and she and Shulk look forward to meeting the people of their boundless new world.

==== Future Connected ====
One year later, with the world's restoration underway, Shulk and Melia set out together to the remnant of Bionis's shoulder after reports that the High Entia capital Alcamoth has reappeared, with Riki's children Kino and Nene tagging along as stowaways. An energy beam from a black fog on Alcamoth attacks their ship, and they learn from a local High Entia outpost that the Fog King, a being from outside the current reality, is attacking the land. Shulk and Melia help to resolve ethnic tensions between the garrison and a local township housing Machina, while Melia makes peace with Tyrea, who is in the area researching the Fog King. Shulk and Melia find a way to weaken the Fog King, and manage to defeat it and reclaim Alcamoth with help from surviving Telethia. The scenario ends with Melia being crowned as Empress of the High Entia.

== Development ==
A model depicting two giant gods frozen in mid-combat, created by Tetsuya Takahashi and Yasuyuki Honne from a concept by Takahashi. This model became the starting point for the development of Xenoblade Chronicles.

Xenoblade Chronicles was developed by Japanese development company Monolith Soft, with Tetsuya Takahashi forming the original concept and serving as the game's executive director. In the 1990s, Takahashi had previously worked on Xenogears, then on the Xenosaga trilogy after founding Monolith Soft in 1999. Xenosaga was intended to be a six-part series, but low commercial performances caused the series to be halved. After these events, the entire development team was in a state of low morale. The initial concept for Xenoblade Chronicles, of people living on the bodies of gigantic gods, came to Takahashi in June 2006. Struck by his idea, he immediately committed it to paper and showed the draft to other senior staff, who were favorably impressed. One of the staff, Yasuyuki Honne, thought that it would make a good 3D model and bought materials to create it. Construction began in July: during this period, younger staff acted as models so that Takahashi could establish which parts of the gods' bodies could be used as habitable and navigable environments in various poses.

After the model's construction, Takahashi decided to combine the model's concept with an unrelated story idea, which became the basis for a new game after positive feedback from staff. Takahashi later said that one of the main reasons for developing the game was to bolster team morale after the commercial failure of the Xenosaga games. The team first showed their proposal to Nintendo prior to the final development stages of Disaster: Day of Crisis. Development began over four years prior to its release, with the first prototypes for the game being developed in April 2007. Co-director Genki Yokota was brought in by Nintendo to handle any system-related issues because of his previous experience with RPGs. After being contacted regarding both Xenoblade Chronicles and fellow Wii JRPG The Last Story, head of Nintendo's licensing department Shinji Hatano said that the games should be made for a wide audience and using a "romanticist approach". Takahashi was involved in every aspect of the game's development, from its initial concept to the debugging stage. At the beginning of development, the game was going to be a stand-alone title unrelated to the Xeno series, originally being titled Monado: Beginning of the World. Later, then-Nintendo president Satoru Iwata had the title changed to its current one to honor both Takahashi's previous titles and the effort he was investing in Xenoblade Chronicles. According to Takahashi, the "Xeno" designation was more along the lines of a symbol, calling back to the previous works of Monolith Soft. When describing the title's meaning, Takahashi described "Xeno" as meaning "different nature" or "uniqueness", while the "Blade" part was closely tied to the narrative, particularly the game's ending.

A key element of the game for Takahashi was creating an ideal balance between gameplay and story, something that he felt was lacking in other JRPGs which focused too much on story. Takahashi's previous experiences with the Xenosaga games and Baten Kaitos: Eternal Wings and the Lost Ocean, which had been called out for being old-fashioned when compared to other RPGs of the day, influenced his work in this regard. The mechanic of Shulk getting glimpses of the future became the foundation of the entire battle system. Takahashi briefly experimented with a turn-based battle system that incorporated the feature, but it did not work out. In a separate issue, Takahashi decided against a transition between the environment and a battle arena as he felt such a transition would negatively interrupt the flow of gameplay. The game features a fully open world, which was described by Takahashi as "overwhelming, like an MMORPG", describing the world size as being roughly equivalent to the Japanese archipelago. The scale of the world was derived from Takahashi's wish to showcase the grandeur of the experience. In addition to this, the number and length of cutscenes was cut down significantly from those present in the Xenosaga games, with Takahashi considering such a development method as having become a "dead end". The wish for an expansive world also became tied up with the wish to reward players for exploration, which entailed creating a large amount of content, such as items and accessories. The gameplay was influenced both by previous Japanese RPGs and Western RPGs. When the team ran into difficulties, Takahashi went to Nintendo in a "deflated" state to suggest numerous means of meeting the game's projected deadline. Nintendo producer Hitoshi Yamagami rejected all of Takahashi's proposals and instead insisted the team persist with their vision, saying he would persuade Nintendo to continue supporting them.

=== Scenario ===
The scenario was created by Takahashi, Yuichiro Takeda, and Yurie Hattori. Takahashi was responsible for creating the main concept, but as he was going to be director and executive producer, he was unable to also take on full script-writing duties, so he asked Takeda to be his partner in creating the scenario. Takeda was a writer for anime, and had previously collaborated with Takahashi on adaptations of the first Xenosaga game, in addition to writing the script for Xenosaga I & II, the Nintendo DS remake of Xenosaga and its sequel. Takahashi deliberately chose someone outside the video game industry as he wanted a different perspective on the story's pacing. Hattori was brought in during the early development stages due to her experience with scenarios for Nintendo games, which enabled her to look at Takahashi and Takeda's scenario from an objective viewpoint. A key element in the scenario was contrasting senses of scale, which Takahashi described as "contrasting the realms of the micro and the macro", while the main story themes were characters embarking on a great and evolving journey, and overcoming a predetermined future. Despite multiple fantasy elements, Xenoblade Chronicles is based within a science fiction premise, although such elements were kept low-key during the first part of the game.

Despite their earlier work together, it was the first time Takahashi and Takeda were so intimately involved in a project. Takeda found working on the project more difficult than he initially anticipated: his standard writing form was for the anime series format, which was limited to episodes of 20–25 minutes. With Xenoblade Chronicles, the volume of story and writing work was much larger and offered more freedom for dramatic expression. Conversely, his previous experience enabled Takahashi to easily plan the structure and scheduling for the game. During the initial writing stages, Takahashi did not give precise instructions to Takeda: he instead gave a rough outline that they worked on together, then they passed the developing script between themselves, along with producers Shingo Kawabata and Koh Kojima, to iron out rough elements. Takahashi compared it to playing a game of catch, something he was unused to doing for his game scenarios. The ending underwent revisions: while Takahashi and Takeda felt they had created a fairly explanatory ending, Hattori still felt unsatisfied. After a second look, Takahashi and Takeda realized that it would appear perplexing for someone outside the writing process, so they rewrote it to be more player-friendly. The final script contained a large amount of dialogue: the sheer volume, which included dialogue spoken in battle, made for a difficult experience while recording. Due to all the effort, Takahashi was emphatic that as much of it as possible be used, although he sometimes felt that there was too much. In the end, some dialogue needed to be cut as testers felt that the characters talked too much. Takahashi's overall writing style was made deliberately more mature and subdued than other games within the genre.

One of the elements that was of great concern to both Takahashi and Takeda was the main protagonist Shulk. Takahashi had noticed that, in the majority of RPGs, the main protagonist was all too easily disliked even if other characters became fan favorites. Consequently, one of the main priorities was to make Shulk as appealing as possible to players. During this process, it was suggested that Shulk be a silent protagonist, but there was a general wish from the staff for him to speak. In addition to this, Takahashi needed to confront the problem faced in any RPG with voiced characters, which was developing them suitably and writing appropriate dialogue between them. The companion character Riki was cited by Takeda as a favorite of his: on paper Riki sounded an unlikable character, but his voice and appearance acted as a counterbalance to his remarks. One of the scenes where Hattori had input was a scene between Shulk and Fiora which showcased their connection: the original scene had Shulk touching Fiora's cheek, which Hattori felt would look "creepy" coming out of the blue. The scene was altered so Shulk touched her hand instead. One of the early concepts Takeda suggested was that one of the main protagonist's party would betray them and become the final boss, but Takahashi rejected this idea as he felt it would run counter to player expectation. During the course of its development, the story underwent so many revisions that Takahashi forgot what his original concept was, although the basic framework remained intact throughout.

=== Music ===
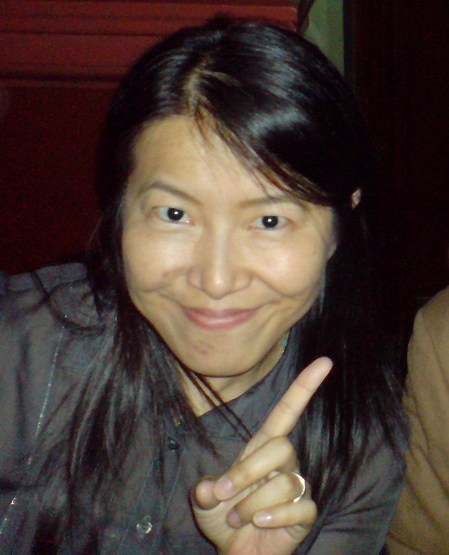
Yoko Shimomura, one of the game's many composers

The original score for Xenoblade Chronicles was composed by Manami Kiyota, ACE+ (a musical production group composed of Tomori Kudo, Hiroyo "CHiCO" Yamanaka, and Kenji Hiramatsu), and Yoko Shimomura. As with other parts of development, Takahashi was deeply involved, constantly rejecting pieces due to what he felt was not fitting for the game. He admitted that this was due to early samples he had given the team for his vision for the music, which they had followed too faithfully for his liking. At Takahashi's request, Nobuo Uematsu's record label Dog Ear Records assisted with production.

The music team was led by Shimomura, who was initially confused by the odd naming of tracks, along with getting the opportunity of using sounds not normally used in compositions in her other projects, such as electric guitars. Kiyota had only previously done superficial work on video game titles; she accepted Dog Ear Records' offer for her to compose music. ACE+ was recommended to Takahashi by Dog Ear Records. Kiyota handled environmental tracks, while ACE+ was in charge of battle tracks in addition to other musical pieces. The team's main goal was to create music that went beyond the typical sound of RPGs. In hindsight, Yamanaka attributed the harmony of the six composers' works to Takahashi's organization and overall direction. The final score contained around ninety tracks. One of the hardest tracks for Shimomura was a nine-minute track that Takahashi requested to match with a movie scene. Later, he said the track needed to change midway through, essentially necessitating the creation of two conjoined themes. The majority of the game's music was written by Kiyota and ACE+, with Shimomura writing eleven tracks. The music was recorded at Burnish Stone Recording Studios in Tokyo. The chorus work was provided by Yamanaka, Kiyota, and Masao Koori.

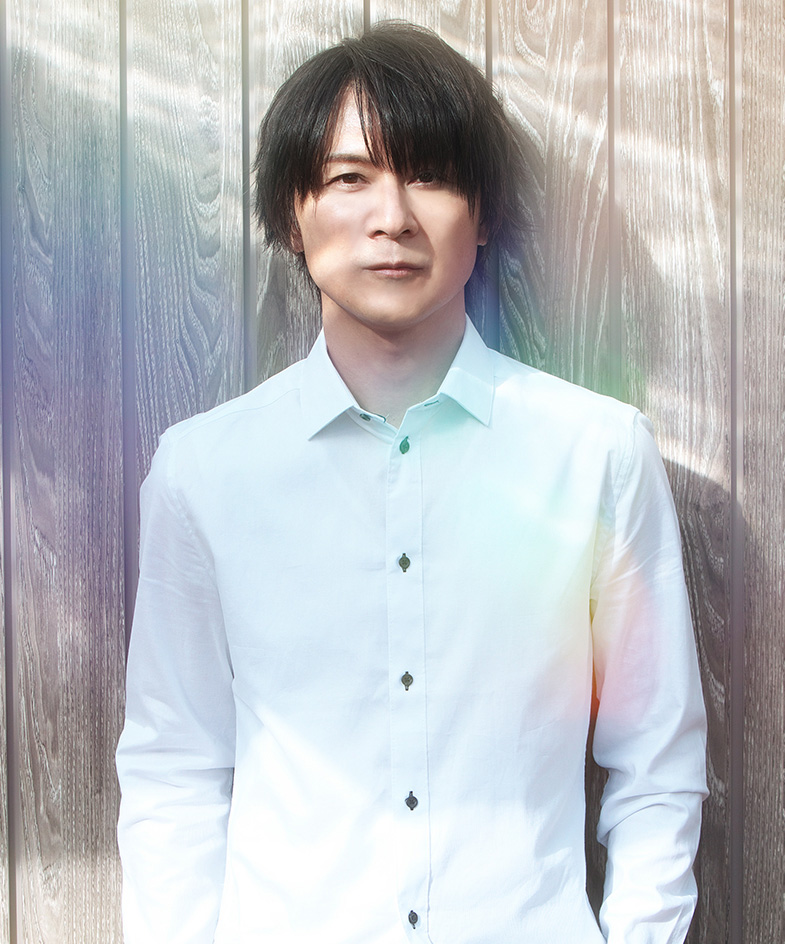
Yasunori Mitsuda composed the game's ending theme, "Beyond the Sky".

The game's ending theme, "Beyond the Sky", was composed by Yasunori Mitsuda and performed in English by Australian singer Sarah Àlainn. Mitsuda was brought in to the music team due to his previous experience with the soundtracks of Xenogears and the first Xenosaga game, and due to Takahashi's long working relationship with him. Takahashi himself personally wrote the original Japanese lyrics for the track, which were translated into English by Lisa Gomamoto. When Mitsuda was contacted, the project was nearing completion, with very little development and composition work left. Despite this, before creating the main theme, Mitsuda asked if he could read the script, which was much larger than he anticipated. The track caused much stress to Mitsuda, who was tasked to create the game's most important song, which needed to incorporate both the diversity of the entire rest of the soundtrack, and mesh with Takahashi's grand vision for the ending of the game.

An official soundtrack album for the game, Xenoblade Original Soundtrack, was released by Dog Ear Records on 23 June 2010. It entered the Oricon charts at #80, and remained in the charts for five weeks. Upon release, the album received praise from critics: while multiple critics were surprised that Shimomura and Mitsuda's contributions were less substantial than originally thought, they found the majority of the music composed by Kiyota and ACE+ to be enjoyable. "Beyond the Sky" also received unanimous praise.

A second soundtrack album featuring the remastered tracks used in Xenoblade Chronicles: Definitive Edition was released on 2 August 2023. It was revealed alongside the soundtrack for Xenoblade Chronicles 3 and the Xenoblade Chronicles Original Soundtrack Trinity Box, a limited edition package featuring the soundtracks for all three numbered games in the series. The album spans 99 tracks across 5 discs, and also features the new music used in the additional campaign, Future Connected.

== Release ==
Xenoblade Chronicles was announced during E3 2009. Its official title and release window were not announced until the beginning of 2010, alongside the announcement of The Last Story. The game released in Japan on 10 June 2010. Nine months after its Japanese release, it was confirmed for release in European territories under the title Xenoblade Chronicles. This version included both the English and Japanese voice tracks. According to Adam Howden, Shulk's English voice actor, he was not given much information prior to his audition, and was never given the full script during recording. According to him, the translated script needed to be altered as some lines came out as longer or shorter than the Japanese originals, and he was told to give Shulk a neutral British-accented voice. Concerning the game's localization, Takahashi stated that while some minor changes were made in the English versions of the game, like bug fixes, minor adjustments to gameplay balance, and slight rewriting of some written content, none of the changes led to any significant differences. Initially planned for release on 2 September 2011, it was released two weeks early on 19 August. In addition to the standard edition, a special edition with a Red Wii Classic Controller Pro was also released. It was later re-released in Europe on the Wii U's Nintendo eShop on 5 August 2015.

Despite being confirmed for a European release, Xenoblade Chronicles was not confirmed for a North American release. Additionally, although the project was announced at E3 2009, the finished game was absent from E3 2011. In an interview on the French television station Nolife, Mathieu Minel, the marketing manager of Nintendo France, stated that Nintendo of Europe had desired to show the game there, but Nintendo of America would not allow it, sparking speculation that it would not be released in North America. In response to this, a dedicated fan campaign was launched called Operation Rainfall. Its goal was to raise fan awareness of the situations felt by three Wii RPGs: Xenoblade Chronicles, The Last Story and Pandora's Tower. Among the campaign tactics used by Operation Rainfall were emails, organized campaigns, online petitions, phone calls, and messages on Nintendo's Facebook and Twitter accounts. One of the most notable efforts was a call to pre-order the game via the original "Monado: Beginning of the World" placeholder on Amazon.com. Their efforts resulted in Xenoblade Chronicles becoming #1 in the site's pre-order gaming charts, beating The Legend of Zelda: Ocarina of Time 3D and the PlayStation 3 bundle for Call of Duty: Black Ops. The campaign also received support from Mistwalker, the developers of The Last Story, and Xenogears and Xenosaga writer Soraya Saga. Takahashi later stated that Monolith Soft developed the game assuming that it would be released overseas.

In the months following these activities, Nintendo of America officially stated that there were no current plans to release the three games in North America, despite acknowledging the great demand for the titles. Rumors eventually emerged that the title would see a North American release when it was listed on the website of gaming retailer GameStop. Soon after this, Nintendo officially announced that the game would be released in the region. In a 2013 interview, Nintendo of America president Reggie Fils-Aimé revealed that Nintendo were considering an American release for Xenoblade Chronicles while Operation Rainfall was active, and that while the campaign did not factor into their decision, they were aware of it and took it into account while deciding whether the release would make a profitable release. Xenoblade Chronicles eventually released in North America on 6 April 2012. It was released in North America as an exclusive to Nintendo's American online store, and GameStop's website and stores. The eShop version released for North America on 28 April 2016.

=== Xenoblade Chronicles 3D ===
A port for the New Nintendo 3DS, titled Xenoblade Chronicles 3D, was released worldwide in April 2015. It features StreetPass functionality, as well as compatibility with the Shulk amiibo. The port was originally announced in August 2014 alongside the New Nintendo 3DS. The port was co-developed by Monster Games, a frequent collaborator with Nintendo on well-received ports. They were requested for the job by Nintendo as the staff at Monolith Soft were already working on the next Xenoblade title. Development on the port started between Autumn and Winter 2013 initially for the original Nintendo 3DS, but initial testing showed that the original platform lacked the memory and power to effectively run the game, since the Wii's processing capabilities were greater than the regular 3DS. Hearing about the New 3DS, it was decided to use its increased processing power to realize the game's ambition. Its increased power made the port possible, and its button layout, with the inclusion of the ZL and ZR shoulder buttons and the C-Stick, meant that the original Wii Classic Controller button layout could be used without adjustment. As part of the alterations made to the title, much of the on-screen information was moved down to the bottom Touch screen so as to de-clutter the top screen, while the layout was carefully arranged so as to maintain the feel of the original as much as possible.

To maintain a steady frame rate and the seamless transitions between environments, unspecified "technical tricks" were used. They also worked hard to include 3D capacity despite the resultant technical difficulties. The most difficult part of the development was getting the game's scale to work within the new hardware. This entailed the creation of a new graphics engine with a custom visibility culling and complex level of detail systems. All of the environments were rebuilt and optimized for the new system while keeping the original aesthetic intact. The reason given for porting the game to the New 3DS rather than the Wii U home console was that the length of the game could be intimidating for the average gamer, who may not have enough free time to sink large amounts of time into home console games.

=== Xenoblade Chronicles: Definitive Edition ===
An expanded remaster of the original game, Xenoblade Chronicles: Definitive Edition, was announced in September 2019 during a Nintendo Direct presentation. It includes enhanced visuals, remastered music, an updated user interface, and other quality-of-life improvements, such as utilizing an art style and graphics similar to Xenoblade Chronicles 2. It also includes a new epilogue scenario titled Future Connected, set one year after the main game's events and focuses on Melia. It was released worldwide for the Nintendo Switch on 29 May 2020.

On 9 June 2026, during a Nintendo Direct presentation, Nintendo announced updated releases of the Xenoblade Chronicles trilogy for Nintendo Switch 2. Xenoblade Chronicles: Definitive Edition – Nintendo Switch 2 Edition was released the same day following the end of the presentation, with a physical release on 30 July. The port features support for higher framerate and resolution, including in cutscenes, and adds several new features, including additional cosmetics, new voice acting for all Heart-to-Heart conversations, and an unlockable "Ether Jet" vehicle for participating in races and quickly traversing the environment.

== Reception ==
Reception

Aggregate scores
Aggregator	Score			
Aggregator	3DS	NS	NS2	Wii
Metacritic	86/100	89/100	86/100	92/100
OpenCritic	N/A	97% recommend	N/A	N/A

Review scores
Publication	Score			
Publication	3DS	NS	NS2	Wii
4Players	85/100	90/100	N/A	N/A
Destructoid	N/A	9.5/10	N/A	8/10
Easy Allies	N/A	9/10	N/A	N/A
Edge	N/A	N/A	N/A	9/10
Electronic Gaming Monthly	8/10	N/A	N/A	3/5
Eurogamer	N/A	Recommended	N/A	9/10
Famitsu	N/A	36/40	N/A	36/40
G4	N/A	N/A	N/A	4.5/5
Game Informer	9/10	N/A	N/A	9.5/10
GamePro	N/A	N/A	N/A	5/5
GameRevolution	4/5	N/A	N/A	N/A
GameSpot	8/10	9/10	N/A	9/10
GamesRadar+	4.5/5	N/A	N/A	4/5
GamesTM	9/10	N/A	N/A	9/10
GameTrailers	N/A	N/A	N/A	9.3/10
Hardcore Gamer	4.5/5	5/5	N/A	N/A
Hyper	80/100	N/A	N/A	N/A
IGN	8.7/10	8/10	N/A	9/10
Jeuxvideo.com	N/A	18/20	N/A	N/A
Joystiq	N/A	N/A	N/A	5/5
NGamer	N/A	N/A	N/A	93%
Nintendo Life	9/10	9/10	N/A	9/10
Nintendo Power	N/A	N/A	N/A	9/10
Nintendo World Report	9/10	9.5/10	N/A	9.5/10
Official Nintendo Magazine	N/A	N/A	N/A	92%
PALGN	N/A	N/A	N/A	9.5/10
Pocket Gamer	4/5	N/A	N/A	N/A
Polygon	8/10	N/A	N/A	N/A
RPGamer	4.5/5	N/A	N/A	5/5
USgamer	3/5	4/5	N/A	N/A
VentureBeat	90/100	N/A	N/A	82/100
VG247	N/A	5/5	N/A	N/A

Since its release, Xenoblade Chronicles has received critical acclaim with praise directed at its story, characters, themes, combat, music, voice acting, and scale, earning perfect scores from Digital Spy, Joystiq, GamePro and RPGamer, and near-perfect scores from most other video gaming websites and magazines. (Note: Edge, Eurogamer, Famitsu, Game Informer, GameSpot (for Wii), GamesRadar (for Wii), GamesTM, GameTrailers, IGN (for Wii), PALGN, and RPGFan.) The game received "universal acclaim", according to review aggregator website Metacritic.

The story was cited by many as being innovative and enjoyable despite a fairly standard premise, while its open nature was seen as a welcome change for the genre: IGN critic Keza MacDonald said that she had been shocked out of expecting Japanese RPGs to be similar to the linear and story-driven Final Fantasy XIII. Its battle system and handling of quests also received praise, with the latter being seen as a great improvement for the genre due to its user-friendly workings. The one point that generally drew criticism were the graphics, with multiple critics disappointed that they lacked the polish of other contemporary consoles. (Note: Edge, Eurogamer, Famitsu, Game Informer, GamePro, GameSpot (for Wii), GamesRadar (for Wii), GamesTM, GameTrailers, Joystiq, PALGN, Digital Spy (for Wii), RPGamer (for Wii), and RPGFan.) IGN, Eurogamer and Edge Magazine cited the game as a triumphant comeback for the JRPG, and a prime example of the genre. The battle system, and to a degree its general gameplay, was favorably compared by multiple critics to that used in Final Fantasy XII.

The New 3DS port also received "generally positive" reviews, according to Metacritic. The port was generally received similar praise to the original Xenoblade Chronicles: many points of praise regarding its gameplay and story were shared with its original release, while new praise was given to the fact that an RPG of its scale had been successfully ported to the platform at all. Despite this, critics cited the graphical downgrade and lackluster implementation of 3D effects as detrimental factors, generally resulting in lower scores for the port when compared to the original game. (Note: Game Informer (for New 3DS), GameSpot (for New 3DS), GamesRadar (for New 3DS), IGN (for New 3DS), Digital Spy (for New 3DS), and RPGamer (for New 3DS).)

=== Awards ===
At the 2011 Japan Game Awards, Xenoblade Chronicles received the "Excellence" award. In IGN's "Best of 2012" awards, the game was named "Best Wii/Wii U Game" and awarded with "Best Wii/Wii U Story". It was also nominated in the "Best Overall Role-playing Game" and "Best Overall Story" categories. In RPGFan's "Game of the Year" awards that same year, it was named "Best Traditional RPG", and was a runner-up for "Best Combat" and "Best RPG", losing both to Mass Effect 3. It was also awarded the site's "Reader's Choice Best RPG" award, with 24% of readers' votes going to Xenoblade Chronicles, beating Persona 4 Golden to the award. In RPGamer's "Best of 2012" awards, it was named as the year's best RPG, along with earning awards for "Best Story" and "Best Music". At the 2012 Golden Joystick Awards, the game was nominated in the "Best RPG" category, although it lost to The Elder Scrolls V: Skyrim. Slant Magazine named it as "Game of the Year" in 2012.

=== Sales ===
During its opening week, Xenoblade Chronicles reached the top of Japan's gaming charts, selling 80,000 units. By the end of 2010, the game had sold over 161,000 copies, making it the eighth best-selling Wii game of the year, and eventually reached almost 200,000 units by the end of 2013. In the UK charts, Xenoblade Chronicles debuted at #7, and reached #2 in the dedicated Wii charts despite stock shortages. According to Gamasutra, it was the fourth best-selling game in the UK during its first week. In the US gaming charts, the game was excluded from the NPD Group's monthly assessment due to it being a retailer exclusive. Investment banking firm Piper Jaffray estimated it to be one of the best-selling games in the United States during the month of April 2012, along with Mass Effect 3 and Prototype 2. In a later interview, it was stated that the game sold better in the West than in Japan.

Xenoblade Chronicles 3D fared worse, selling 56,932 copies in its first week in Japan. Roughly 78,000 Japanese copies had been sold by the end of June 2015. In the UK charts, the game debuted at #27, becoming the third best-selling Nintendo product of that week. According to NPD Group figures, the game sold under 75,000, failing to enter the top ten. However, Nintendo stated that the game was the fifth best-selling platform exclusive that week.

As of December 2020, Xenoblade Chronicles: Definitive Edition had sold 1.52 million copies. The 2023 CESA Games White Papers revealed that Xenoblade Chronicles: Definitive Edition had sold 1.88 million units as of December 2022.

== Legacy ==
=== In other media ===
Shulk has been featured as a playable character in the Super Smash Bros. crossover fighting game series, appearing in its Nintendo 3DS and Wii U and Ultimate installments. Gaur Plain, a location in the game, appears as a stage along with several music tracks; one of the game's recurring antagonists, Metal Face, appears as a hazard on said stage; Dunban and Riki accompany Shulk during his Final Smash, with Fiora appearing as part of the Final Smash in Ultimate. Additionally, Riki appears as an Assist Trophy, using his own Arts to disrupt opponents. Fiora was later featured as a playable character in the crossover game Project X Zone 2, representing the Xeno series alongside Xenosaga character KOS-MOS, opposite Metal Face as an enemy character.

=== Sequels ===
By using experience gained during development of Xenoblade Chronicles and listening to feedback on the game, Takahashi and the team began work on a spiritual successor for the Wii U. Titled Xenoblade Chronicles X, it was released worldwide in 2015. A parallel story for the Nintendo Switch, Xenoblade Chronicles 2, was released worldwide in December 2017, and Shulk and Fiora appear as optional Blades to recruit via the DLC expansion pass. Both Xenoblade Chronicles and Xenoblade Chronicles 2 received a sequel, Xenoblade Chronicles 3, in 2022. There are many allusions to the first two games throughout the third installment, with certain characters serving major supporting roles in the story and various gameplay aspects as well. Shulk and Alvis reappear in the DLC story expansion Future Redeemed, which takes place after the events of the first two games and some time before the events of the third. Shulk is a playable character, and he and Fiora's implied son, Nikol, is also playable.
