= Shulk =

Fictional character in the Xenoblade Chronicles series

- Xenoblade character
- Shulk as depicted in Xenoblade Chronicles: Definitive Edition
- First game: Xenoblade Chronicles (2010)
- Created by: Tetsuya Takahashi
- Voiced by: EN: Adam Howden; JP: Shintarō Asanuma

In-universe information
- Occupation: Mechanic
- Affiliation: Colony 9 Defence Force
- Significant other: Fiora
- Children: Nikol

Shulk (Note: Japanese: シュルク, Hepburn: Shuruku) is a character and the protagonist of Monolith Soft's 2010 role-playing video game Xenoblade Chronicles, part of the Xenoblade series of video games. The game centers around Shulk mastering the mystical Monado sword and protecting his home from the Mechon, an invading race of mechanical beings. Shulk gained an increase in attention and popularity upon his inclusion in Nintendo's 2014 crossover fighting games Super Smash Bros. for Nintendo 3DS and Wii U. While future Xenoblade entries are not centered around Shulk, he was featured in supporting roles in downloadable content (DLC) for Xenoblade Chronicles 2 and Xenoblade Chronicles 3.

Tetsuya Takahashi, the game's creator, wanted to make Shulk a more likable and sympathetic protagonist than those seen in most Japanese role-playing video games. Takahashi thought that because JRPGs take such a large emotional commitment to finish, the more pessimistic and cynical main character type makes the player detest them.

The character has received a mixed reception from video game publications. Although he has received recognition for his vision and convictions among his friends, he has also faced criticism for lacking personality.

== Conception and creation ==
Tetsuya Takahashi, creator of the Xeno series, Xenoblade Chronicles, and Shulk, states that his primary motivation in creating Shulk was to make a more likeable and relatable protagonist than in most Japanese role-playing video games. Xenoblade featured a prolonged, four-year development cycle dating back to 2006, with Takahashi stating that although the game went through many changes, the overarching plot following Shulk remained largely the same. Takahashi believed that the more negative and jaded JRPG main character type leads the player to resent them due to the emotional investment required to complete such long games. Takahashi worked with anime writer Yuichiro Takeda on Shulk's creation, with Takeda feeling that the easiest way to make Shulk likeable would be to make him a silent protagonist. However, Takahashi rejected this idea, feeling that it hurt the character's ability to "resonate with the player". Ultimately, Takahashi went in the opposite direction, making Shulk's positive interactions and words of encouragement a focus of the game. Takahashi tried to make Shulk react to in-game events as much as he thought game players would react to them. Nintendo's team of debuggers, the "Super Mario Club", assured Takahashi that he was on the right track for his goal. Takashi stated that in Xenoblade Chronicles, there was no character design artwork; instead, there were costume drawings for the characters' outfits. This meant that they had to construct CG character models to match the costume ideas. Furthermore, the only artwork produced featuring those characters were altered versions of the CG models; there was no concept art. During the interview, co-producer Genki Yokota stated that Shulk debuting in the Super Smash Bros. series helped to attract new eyes to the brand and emphasized the importance of introducing these characters to an audience unfamiliar with RPGs.

In English, Shulk is voiced by Adam Howden. He was given instructions on how to portray Shulk, largely that he should have a neutral English accent, which was intelligent, "not posh", and fierce when necessary. Howden was never given a full script of the game so he could more realistically sound surprised at the game's plot twists, but was informed of the story progression shortly before he would have to voice it so he would not sound baffled. In Japanese, Shulk is voiced by Shintarō Asanuma. Having not played the character on a regular basis for many years, Asanuma admitted to feeling anxious when recording for the Future Connected story. Furthermore, he stated that he believed he had evolved as a performer during the previous ten years, acquiring voice acting skills and altering his breathing pattern. He thought that he had purposefully adjusted several aspects of his lines in Xenoblade Chronicles 2 to give them a more "senior feel". During his portrayal of Shulk, he made a particular effort to highlight his innocence.

== Appearances ==
Shulk debuted in Xenoblade Chronicles (2010) as the game's primary protagonist, portrayed as favoring "brains over brawn". He lost his parents 14 years prior to the game's events during an expedition for the Monado, a powerful sword that only a select few can wield. Shulk lives in the Colony 9 settlements where he works as an engineer and studies the Monado. The colony is attacked by an invading mechanical race called the Mechon, and his childhood friend and love interest Fiora is killed. During the attack, Shulk becomes the Monado's chosen wielder, which allows him to glimpse the near future. The game follows Shulk's quest to stop the Mechon and avenge Fiora and his struggle to understand his visions and change the future for the better, while uncovering the Monado's origin and hidden capabilities. Optional side missions cover smaller quirks in Shulk's personality, such as a distaste for vegetables and fear of caterpillars.

In August 2014, a handheld port of Xenoblade Chronicles, titled Xenoblade Chronicles 3D, was announced for Nintendo's New Nintendo 3DS system, with Shulk reprising his role as the main character. In Xenoblade Chronicles: Future Connected (2020), an epilogue campaign added to the Definitive Edition release of the game, Shulk assists his friend Melia in retaking Alcamoth, the capital city of the birdlike High Entia race.

Shulk, along with Fiora, appears in Xenoblade Chronicles 2's "Challenge Mode" downloadable content (DLC) (2017), where they are playable as "Blades" — side characters directed during battle. An older version of Shulk appears as one of the playable party members in Xenoblade Chronicles 3's Future Redeemed (2022) story expansion. Set between the events of Future Connected and Xenoblade Chronicles 3, Shulk joins Xenoblade Chronicles 2 protagonist Rex in founding the Liberators, a rebel group that opposes the Moebius organization threatening the newly-merged world of Aionios. Nikol, the son of Shulk and Fiora, also appears as a playable party member.

Outside of the Xenoblade series, Shulk has been featured in Nintendo's crossover fighting game Super Smash Bros. for Nintendo 3DS and Wii U (2014). Shulk reappears in the series' 2018 entry Super Smash Bros. Ultimate. In November 2014, it was announced that Shulk would receive his own amiibo figure, which can be used in conjunction with Super Smash Bros. for Nintendo 3DS, Wii U and Ultimate, Super Mario Maker (2015), Yoshi's Woolly World (2015), and Xenoblade Chronicles 3D and 3.

== Reception ==
Shulk received a mixed reception from critics. According to Katharine Byrne of Nintendojo, Monolith Soft's handling of Shulk's previously revealed ability to glimpse into the future is one aspect that deserves special recognition. She also noted that the players are given a careful and nuanced analysis of Shulk's challenges in coping with these visions, and the themes behind this capability are deeply embedded into the overall story, making it more than just a clever fighting technique. Phil Kollar of Game Informer said that the voice acting gives this game a significant advantage over the typical stereotype-heavy JRPG, even though the characters may not deviate from well-worn tropes. He said that throughout the narrative, Shulk has the potential to come across as cloyingly hopeful or whining at different moments, and Xenoblade skillfully avoids that usual issue because of the writing and voice acting. Hope Pisoni of Paste stated that one of the main features of Xenoblade Chronicles is the narrative centered around Shulk's visions. She went on to say that he has a power that lets him see the future and uses it to stop the deaths of his friends and allies.

Tom Regan of VG247 said that many may recognize the game's protagonist as "that weird naked guy from Smash," but stated that there are more JRPG cliches than you can shake a potion at thanks to Shulk's almost overly positive outlook, faith in his allies, and will to overcome obstacles. Engadget's Kat Bailey stated that she is a fan of Shulk and said that "It's not that his voice actor is better than average, or the fact that he's on a roaring rampage of revenge. It's that he has real friends." According to the book EDGE Special Edition: The 100 Greatest Videogames (2015), Shulk is an orphan who yields a legendary sword and carries an otherworldly power, but "he's not a cocksure, reckless, or headstrong teenager." They stated that "he's an unusually thoughtful and compassionate youngster, brave but not foolhardy, with a poise beyond his years." Conversely, some reviewers complained of him being too plain. Destructoid reviewer James Stephanie Sterling complained that Shulk lacked personality, stating that he was little more than a "vanilla reactionar[y] with only vague snatches of individuality," and otherwise blended into the rest of the cast too much. Similarly, Jason Schreier of Kotaku referred to Shulk as a "personality-less, unequivocally bland warrior" who "makes other JRPG heroes look like Marlon friggin' Brando."

In comparison, Shulk also received a mixed reception in Super Smash Bros. series. Heavy, TechnoBuffalo and GamesRadar+ felt that his Monado, particularly the carryover of its "Arts" customization mechanics from Xenoblade Chronicles, made him a strong choice to play as. However, USGamer felt that Shulk "can be a tricky fighter" due to the Monado's Arts being accompanied by kanji, and suggested that non-native speakers should first practice utilizing the Arts to become familiar with each one. Jeremy Parish of Polygon criticized by stating as "sorry, Shulk. It's nice that Nintendo is letting you rep Xenoblade, but I'm afraid I'm not really feelin' it.", while Gavin Jasper of Den of Geek also criticized him by calling Shulk "as not too shabby, but being overshadowed by the rest of the Smash 4 roster".

In Student Independent Projects Historical Studies 2017: Human Freedom: Existential Philosophy in Video Games, Anthony J. Eisner from University of Newfoundland compared Shulk with Tidus from Final Fantasy X, seeing both as messiah figures who find their purpose to fight and protect a society despite both coming from nearly blank states. Like Tidus, Shulk wants humanity to be free from people who force their ideals on others, resulting in the creation of a new status quo.
