= Nicola Bertram =

British actress

- Born: 13 January 1966 (age 60); Ardwick, Manchester, England
- Occupation: Actress
- Years active: 1995–present
- Website: nicolabertram.com

Nicola Bertram (born 13 January 1966) is a British actress, best known for her roles in British television's longest running soap opera Coronation Street, ITV's The Bill, the BBC's Eastenders, Panorama, and the film, Green Street Hooligans 2 among other roles. Voiceover credits include Pirates of the Caribbean: On Stranger Tides and the role-playing video game Dragon Age Origins. She has also performed numerous television and film roles in her native United Kingdom as well as the United States.

Bertram was born in Manchester, England. She and her husband moved to California in 2007.
