= Dragon Age: Origins =

2009 video game

- Developer: BioWare (Note: Ported to PlayStation 3 and Xbox 360 by Edge of Reality. Ported to Mac OS X by TransGaming via the Cider engine.)
- Publisher: Electronic Arts
- Directors: Dan Tudge; Mark Darrah
- Producers: Derek French; Vanessa Kade; Kevin Loh; Kyle Scott
- Designers: Brent Knowles; Mike Laidlaw; James Ohlen
- Programmer: Ross Gardner
- Artist: Dean Andersen
- Writer: David Gaider
- Composer: Inon Zur
- Series: Dragon Age
- Engine: Eclipse Engine
- Platforms: Windows; Xbox 360; PlayStation 3; Mac OS X
- Release: November 3, 2009: Windows, Xbox 360; NA: November 3, 2009; AU: November 5, 2009; EU: November 6, 2009 PlayStation 3; NA: November 3, 2009; EU: November 6, 2009; AU: November 19, 2009 Mac OS X; NA: December 21, 2009
- Genre: Role-playing
- Mode: Single-player

Dragon Age: Origins is a 2009 role-playing video game developed by Canadian studio BioWare and published by Electronic Arts. It is the first game in the Dragon Age franchise. Set in the fictional kingdom of Ferelden during a period of civil strife, the game puts the player in the role of a warrior, mage, or rogue coming from an elven, human, or dwarven background. The player character is recruited into the Grey Wardens, an ancient order that stands against monstrous forces known as "Darkspawn", and is tasked with defeating the Archdemon that commands them and ending their invasion. The game is played from a third-person perspective that can be shifted to a top-down perspective. Throughout the game, players encounter various companions, who play major roles in the game's plot and gameplay.

BioWare described Dragon Age: Origins as a "dark heroic fantasy" set in a unique world, and a spiritual successor to their previous Baldur's Gate and Neverwinter Nights franchises. Development of the game began in 2002 and BioWare employed more than 144 voice-actors, and hired Inon Zur to compose the game's music. While BioWare decided early that it will be a fantasy game, dragons were added late in the game's development after the team used a name generator to create the game's title. The development of the game's console versions was outsourced to Edge of Reality. Origins was released for Microsoft Windows, Xbox 360, and PlayStation 3 in November 2009, and for Mac OS X in December 2009.

Origins received critical acclaim upon release, with praise mostly directed at its story, setting, characters, music and combat system. It sold more than 3.2 million copies and 1 million pieces of downloadable content. It won multiple year-end accolades including Game of the Year and Best Role-playing awards from several gaming publications, and has widely been considered to be one of the greatest video games ever made. BioWare released several instances of downloadable content after the game's initial launch, an expansion pack for the game titled Awakening in March 2010, and three sequels, Dragon Age II, Dragon Age: Inquisition, and Dragon Age: The Veilguard, were released in 2011, 2014 and 2024 respectively.

== Gameplay ==
Dragon Age: Origins is a role-playing game played from a third-person perspective. The player is a Grey Warden, part of an order of elite fighters, whose task is to defeat the Archdemon and save the world from a disastrous event called the Blight. Players create their own Grey Warden character, customizing gender and appearance as well as choosing a race and class. The available classes are warriors, who perform strong physical attacks and protect their allies; rogues, who carry out stealth attacks and steal items from other characters; and mages, who cast spells on enemies, create combo spells, and support other party members. The three choices of race are human, elf, and dwarf. The combination of class and race determines which of six different origin stories the player experiences: Dalish Elf, Dwarf Commoner, City Elf, Mage, Human Noble, or Dwarf Noble. This affects the way other in-game characters perceive the player's character; for instance, a Dwarven Commoner would receive hatred and discrimination from other dwarves. However, all classes follow the same plot after the completion of the origin story.

Example of a user-created dwarf character in combat with an Ogre, a powerful Darkspawn creature

During gameplay, the player encounters a variety of enemies, including giant spiders, Darkspawn, ghosts, walking trees, and dragons. They also recruit companions, who accompany them and provide assistance in battle. These companions are normally controlled by artificial intelligence, with behaviour that the player can adjust through the "Tactics" menu, but the player also has the option to switch between characters and is able to issue orders to them in real-time or pause the game to queue up actions. The player and any companions in their party engage in combat with the weapons they have equipped when the player targets or is noticed by a hostile enemy. Players can swap weapons and perform special attacks during combat, but most of these attacks have a recharge time. The point of view can be shifted from the third-person view to a top-down view, where friendly and hostile units are labelled with different colours to distinguish them. At the end of a battle the characters' health and stamina, which powers a character's skills, are automatically refilled. When an enemy is defeated, the player collects any items or loot from its corpse. Companions who are not in the player's active party stay in the base camp, a hub where the player can talk to their party members as well as purchase new weapons, armour, and gear. In addition to the main story, the player can learn more about the world of Thedas by collecting the codices scattered throughout the game.

The player can level up their Warden character by earning experience points through exploring new areas, completing quests, and defeating enemies. Each time the player levels up, they receive three points to spend on the character's six attributes. Strength inflicts more damage, Dexterity helps evade attacks more often, Willpower increases stamina (or mana for Mages), Magic increases spell damage and magic defence, Cunning improves combat tactics, and Constitution increases the character's health. Special skills, which are divided into four different aspects for each class, and specialization options, which offer class-specific skills, can also be unlocked by levelling up.

The player can talk and interact with both party members and other non-playable characters. A dialogue tree offers several dialogue options for the player to select. Through conversation, the player can unlock unique quests and dialogue revealing the lore of Dragon Age. It can also be used to persuade or intimidate other characters. The player often must choose between morally ambiguous options, which result in consequences that affect the game's world and progression and can even lead to the death of a potential companion. Companions react to the player's choices through an "approval system". When they dislike or object to the player's decisions, their approval drops, which can result in a companion leaving the party or even attacking the Warden. Approval points can also be influenced by gifts, which will improve any companion's approval but are each intended for a specific companion. Some gifts, if given to the right character, start a cutscene and can even unlock a quest. A high approval rating improves a companion's morale and gives bonuses to their combat abilities. A significant approval rating also makes it possible for the Warden to pursue a romantic relationship with certain companions. The game's "interaction reactivity" system means that the way a player treats one companion affects the approval rating of other companions as well.

== Synopsis ==
=== Setting ===
The game is set in Ferelden, one of several countries in the fictional world of Thedas. Savage creatures called the Darkspawn dwell within the Deep Roads, an underground highway system created by the dwarves long ago, deep beneath the surface of Thedas. Every few hundred years, the Darkspawn swarm the surface world in a movement known as a Blight. Ever since the first Blight, Thedas has relied on the legendary order of warriors known as the Grey Wardens to drive the Darkspawn back. Dragon Age: Origins begins on the eve of Thedas's fifth Blight.

Thedas is a world in which race and class combine to determine social class and political dynamics. Elves are often viewed as second-class citizens by humans, while human nobles are treated with respect. Mages, on the other hand, are cloistered by the Chantry: they have access to the Fade, the unconscious realm that is the home of spirits, and a single lapse in vigilance could cause them to be possessed by demons. Apostate mages, who live outside the Chantry's control, are considered extremely dangerous, and the Chantry has a military wing, the Templars, to seek out and subdue them by any means necessary. Dwarves live in the Deep Roads; their kingdom a shadow of what it once was before the first Blight, and their society is rooted in tradition and a rigid caste system. Dalish Elves live a nomadic lifestyle away from most cities, proudly attempting to preserve and reclaim the ancient Elven heritage that was mostly wiped out long ago when the Elven empire that ruled most of the lands mysteriously collapsed.

Two prequel novels released in 2009, Dragon Age: The Stolen Throne and its direct sequel Dragon Age: The Calling, provide context for the game's lore as well as the backstories of several characters and their relevant conflicts in Origins.

=== Characters ===
A selection of character concept art. From left to right: Sten, Oghren, Wynne, Zevran, Nathaniel Howe, Loghain Mac Tir, Maric Theirin, Alistair.

The chief protagonist of Dragon Age: Origins is the player-controlled character, whose biography and combat specialization are determined by the race and class chosen at the start of the game. While the player can choose his or her avatar's first name, the character is usually referred to as "The Warden" by other characters and the game's narration.

Many of the game's non-player characters (NPCs) are companion characters, who appear throughout the game and may volunteer their services. Companions include Alistair, a reluctantly heroic Grey Warden with a sarcastic wit; Morrigan, a spiteful apostate mage who has little regard for authority or social mores; Leliana, a lay sister of the Ferelden Chantry whose optimistic and virtuous demeanor belies an aptitude for espionage and combat; Sten, a proud but stoic warrior of the deeply regimented Qunari people who often questions the ways of other races; Oghren, an unkempt dwarven warrior whose love of alcohol is only matched by his penchant for physical violence and loyalty to his friends; Wynne, a senior member of the Ferelden Circle of Magi, a maternal figure to the party and a powerful healer; Zevran, a rakish elven assassin who is fond of treasures, sex and innuendo; and a loyal Mabari War Hound, which the player can name and use for scouting and combat. With the DLC The Stone Prisoner installed, Shale, a sarcastic Golem with a mild ornithophobia who was a female dwarf in her prior life, is also available as an optional companion.

Outside of companion characters, NPCs significant to the Origins plot include Duncan, the Grey Warden who recruits the player; Arl Eamon Guerrin of Redcliffe, the uncle of Ferelden's naive but courageous King Cailan Theirin; Bann Teagan Guerrin, the brother of Arl Eamon; Queen Anora, Cailan's politically savvy wife, with a commanding personality that is somewhat offset by her ambition and ruthlessness; and Flemeth, Morrigan's mother, who appears to be a harmless old woman, but in truth is an infamous dark witch of Fereldan legend.

The rampaging Darkspawn horde is led by the Archdemon Urthemiel, supposedly one of the Old Gods of the Tevinter Imperium incarnated in the form of a powerful and corrupted dragon with total control over the Darkspawn. The game's other main antagonists are Loghain Mac Tir, Teyrn of Gwaren and father of Queen Anora, a once-respected war hero gone mad with ambition and paranoia; and Rendon Howe, the amoral and corrupt Arl of Amaranthine who allies with Loghain to further his own ambitions.

=== Plot ===
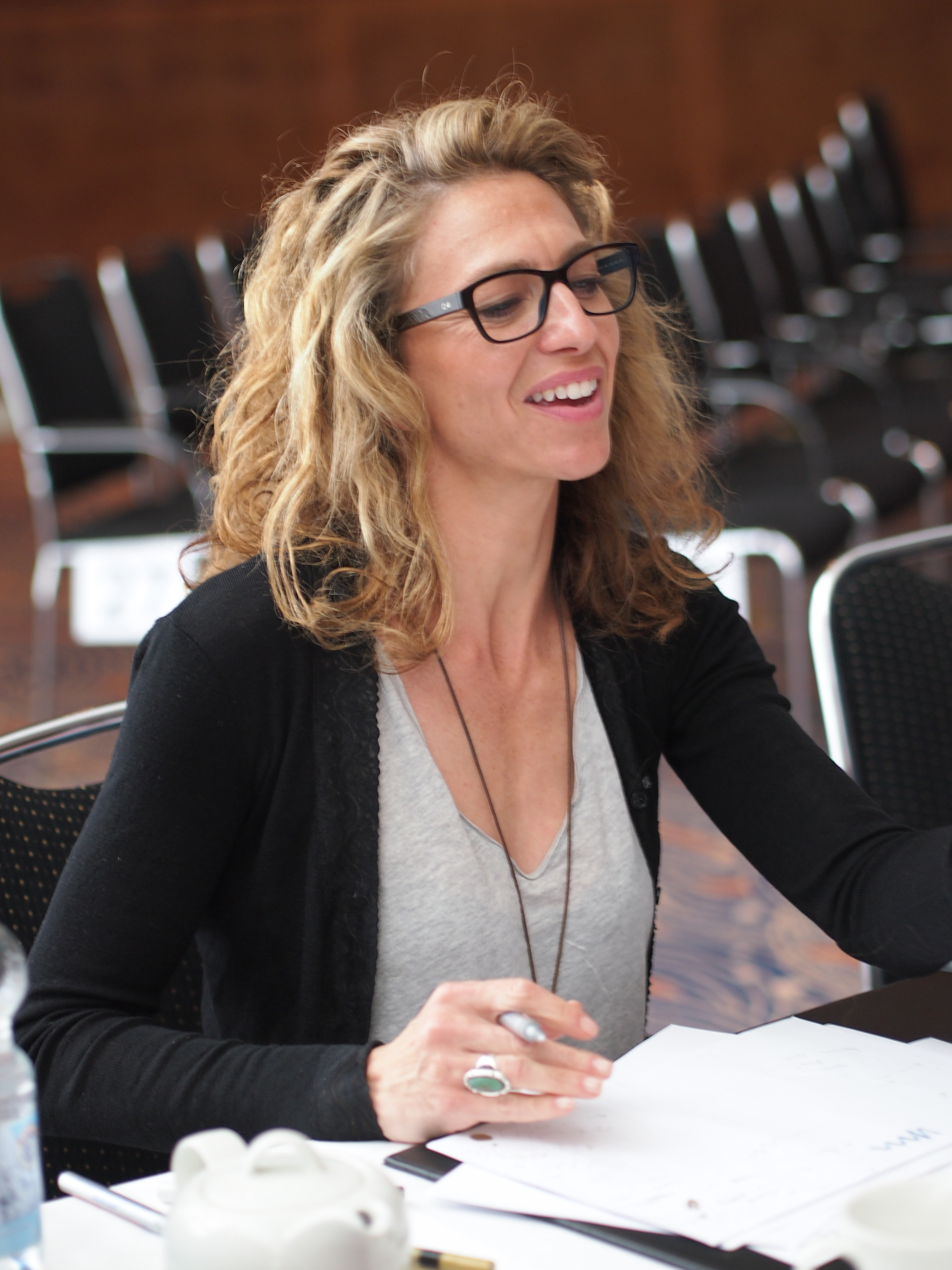
Claudia Black voiced Morrigan, a human mage companion.

One of six predetermined origin stories begins the game, depending on the player character's race and class. Each story ends with the player leaving with Duncan, the commander of Ferelden's Grey Wardens who is seeking new recruits and selects the player as a candidate. The two journey to Ferelden's southern fortress, Ostagar, to join Cailan, the King of Ferelden, and his father-in-law Loghain, a legendary general and close friend of Cailan's late father, King Maric. The three leaders plan to attack the encroaching Darkspawn to stop a new Blight from overwhelming Ferelden. Duncan senses the influence of an Archdemon, a god-like Dragon that commands the Darkspawn, and emphasizes the importance of defeating the Blight before it can threaten the rest of Thedas.

Duncan initiates the player into the Grey Wardens via a ritual called the Joining, which involves imbibing Darkspawn blood. The recipient, if they survive, is granted the Taint, a connection into the Darkspawn hive mind to sense them. After surviving, the player (now nicknamed "The Warden") and fellow Grey Warden Alistair are tasked with lighting a beacon at the top of the fortress to signal Loghain's men into charging the Darkspawn horde flank. However, upon arriving, Loghain abandons the battlefield, leaving Cailan, Duncan, and their army to be slain by the Darkspawn, who seize control of Ostagar and begin advancing into southern Ferelden.

The Warden and Alistair are saved by Flemeth, a powerful witch who lives in seclusion. Flemeth sends her daughter Morrigan to accompany the Warden and Alistair in gathering a new army to combat the Archdemon and stop the Blight. Using ancient Grey Warden treaties, the Warden travels across Ferelden to enlist the aid of the Circle of Magi, the Dalish Elves, the Dwarves of Orzammar, and soldiers in Redcliffe loyal to Arl Eamon. In addition, Alistair reveals that he is a bastard son of King Maric, making him a contender for the now vacant throne. Meanwhile, Loghain returns to Ferelden's capital city, Denerim, to inform his daughter, Queen Anora, of Cailan's death. Loghain scapegoats the Grey Wardens for the defeat at Ostagar and demands the deaths of any survivors. While Anora inherits her husband's authority, Loghain declares himself her regent and seizes control of the kingdom, becoming a tyrannical ruler determined to retain power. Ferelden's nobility rebel against him, igniting a civil war which ends in an inconclusive stalemate and allows the Darkspawn to advance further into Ferelden unopposed.

Eamon then calls a Landsmeet among the nobles of Ferelden to rally the kingdom against the Darkspawn, where the Warden or a party member defeats Loghain in a duel. If Alistair defeats Loghain, he will then execute him. Otherwise, the Warden can either have Loghain executed or recruited into the Grey Wardens and the party in place of Alistair (who quits both in turn). Dependent on this and other past decisions, the Warden then settles who assumes Ferelden's throne (Alistair and/or Anora), with the option of marrying the one of opposite gender if a Human Noble.

Before the final battle, the Warden learns that a Grey Warden must slay the Archdemon to prevent it from releasing a demonic essence which finds a new host in the nearest Darkspawn. The essence will be drawn to the Taint, killing the Warden in the process. Morrigan meets with the Warden and proposes a ritual that will see her conceive a child with a Warden. The Archdemon, upon death, will instead be drawn to the child, born as a demigod with the Taint, sparing the Warden who slays it. Morrigan agrees to conceive the child on the condition that she raise it alone. The Warden can accept Morrigan's offer (if male), convince Alistair/Loghain to take part instead, or refuse the proposal (which causes Morrigan to leave the party).

The next day, the Warden and the newly assembled army gather in Denerim. They repel the Darkspawn horde and vanquish the Archdemon. If Morrigan's ritual was performed, the Warden slays the Archdemon. If not, they must decide whether they or Alistair/Loghain does so and perishes in the process. The remaining Darkspawn retreat from Denerim, marking the end of the Fifth Blight. The story ends with a ceremony attended by Ferelden citizens, where the Warden and their companions are honoured for saving the kingdom. An epilogue details the ramifications of the Warden's choices, including the future of Ferelden, any rumours, and the fates of his or her companions.

== Development ==
=== Design ===
Dragon Age: Origins was created by the Edmonton studio of BioWare, the developer of Neverwinter Nights and Jade Empire. Development of the game's first demo began in November 2002. It was officially revealed at E3 2004 as simply Dragon Age and was re-revealed as Dragon Age: Origins in July 2008, alongside a new trailer for the game. According to BioWare, they kept any information about the game hidden from the public, to further the game's design and technology. More than 180 people worked on the game, and full-scale production began three years after the game's initial development. The subtitle "Origins" was chosen to represent the six origins storyline, BioWare's return to PC role-playing games, and the beginning of a new franchise. Origins is a spiritual successor to Baldur's Gate and Neverwinter Nights, as an attempt to build a similar fantasy RPG without any licensing restrictions or issues. The similarities are mostly present in gameplay elements, such as real-time tactical combat; the game does not share the Dungeons & Dragons setting of the Baldur's Gate series and is instead set in a period where dragons are prevalent. While the game was initially built with the engine that powered Neverwinter Nights, the team switched to use the Eclipse Engine midway during the game's development. The shift in engine slowed down the game's development significantly.

David Gaider, the lead writer for Origins, built the game's world first before writing the plot. The team chose a "fantasy" setting because Dan Tudge, the game's director, thought that BioWare was at its best in the fantasy genre. In the first draft, there were no Darkspawn or Grey Wardens, and mages were not allowed to use magic in cities. There were twelve different origin stories, including Human Commoner and Avvar, a barbarian origin. However, most of them were scrapped for being "ridiculous", leading to six stories being finalized. Loghain was the first character to be created, while an Ogre, nicknamed "Fluffy", and a human with medium armour were the first enemies designed. The concepts of Alistair and Morrigan were the next to be created, as they play the largest role in the game's plot. Their creation also took far longer than other characters. Morrigan was originally conceived to be similar to Flemeth, speaking whimsically. However, Gaider was not satisfied and decided to completely rewrite her personality. As a result, she was designed as a "blunt" person who always resists her mother. Finding a suitable voice actor for Morrigan took the most time of any character. The game's final version features 68,260 lines of dialogue; the quality assurance testers for the game enabled a cheat to automatically skip these cutscenes and dialogues during test runs. Dragons were added into the game after its title was created using a random name generator.

Ray Muzyka, co-founder of BioWare, said that the team wanted to try something that would be new but familiar to most players. They hoped that Origins would redefine the genre to become The Lord of the Rings of video game franchises. Greg Zeschuk, another co-founder of BioWare, described the fantasy of Dragon Age as in between the high fantasy of J. R. R. Tolkien's works and the low fantasy of works by George R.R. Martin. The goal was a "dark heroic fantasy" that would suit the taste of any fan of the genre. Thus, while the game has the typical races of human, elf, and dwarf, they are slightly altered from the usual nature of the three races, and a new race called the Qunari was introduced. Some of the alterations they made included flipping how certain races, like elves, are treated in other fictional worlds. While elves are often described as a race of high prestige in fiction, Dragon Age: Origins presents them as slaves of humans, labelled as second-class citizens who resent the human race. This extended to the gameplay, where the player can choose to discriminate against other races and can experience discrimination from others based on their choices.

BioWare recognized that non-linear choices are an element unique to video games in the entertainment industry. Zeschuk called the sheer number of choices in the game "big" and "impactful", and the team designed many of those to be emotional and create a more personal experience for the player. They intentionally avoided adding a karma system, as the choices are designed to be ambiguous, with only the player to judge whether they are good or bad. According to Muzyka, their goal was to make players sympathize with events and characters, connecting with them to feel true emotions. This vision challenged the team to balance many key aspects, such as the amount of dialogue and animation in each cutscene, to create a believable scenario for players. The team also hoped to handle romance in a more "mature" and "complicated" way, with a true reflection on human relationships and reactions rather than "adolescent titillation". The game has sex scenes, but no nudity. Muzyka added that it was an artistic choice and a decision made by the team, not the publisher Electronic Arts.

While Origins is a single-player-only game, Muzyka described it as a "social experience", considering the narrative and its variety of paths as an integral part of the gameplay. The characters a player meets, items they collect, and quests they receive and complete may be different, leading to a completely different experience. He also considered the ways a player explores the world and discovers new areas as an exploration narrative. As each player had a different experience, they hoped that those players would collaborate to expand upon their knowledge of the world. To that effect, the team built a community site as an online social environment for players to communicate. Players could share stats and automatically generated screenshots with the community.

=== Sound ===
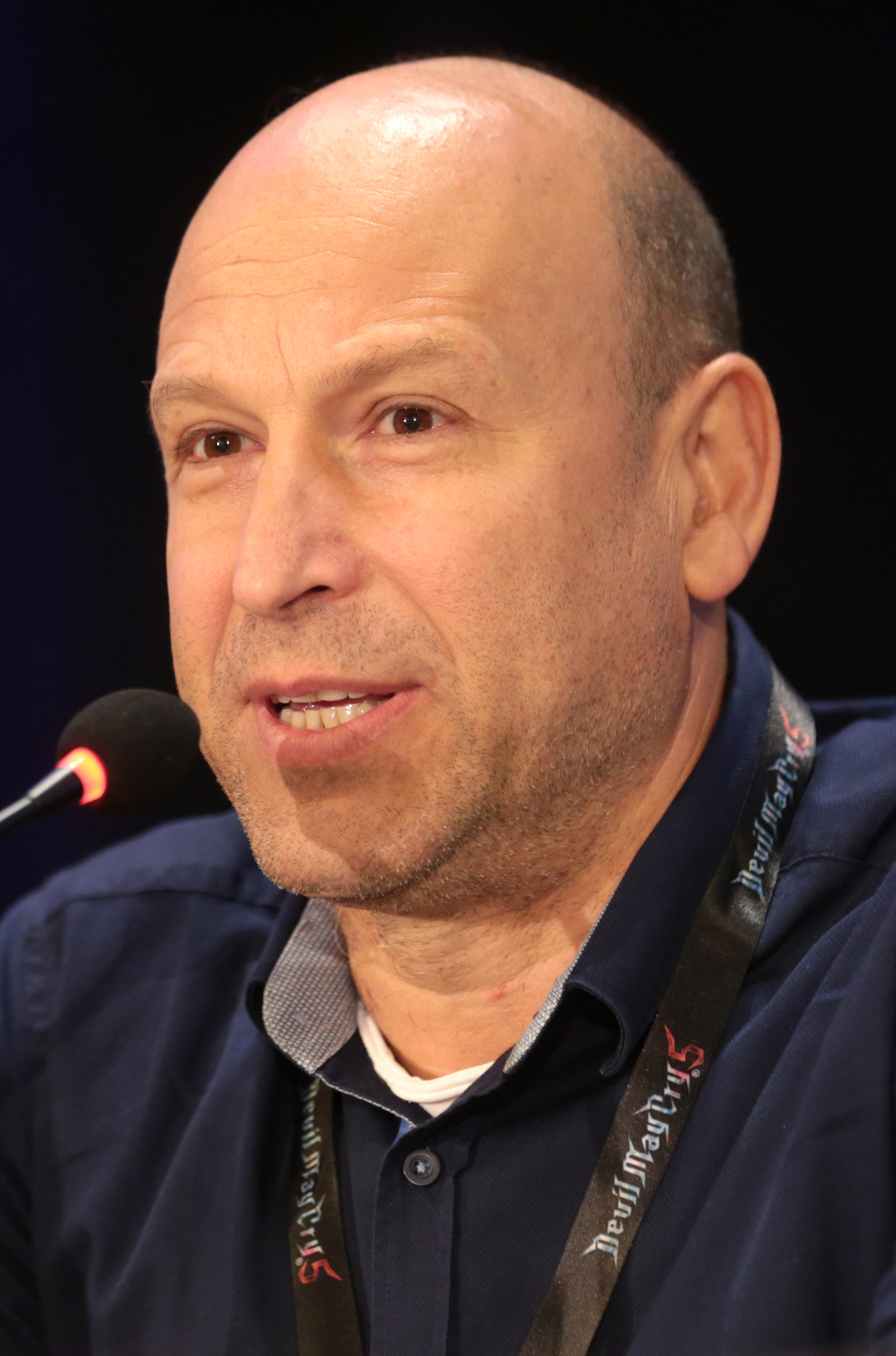
Inon Zur served as the game's composer.

The game features an orchestral soundtrack with a choir, used both in-game and during cutscenes. The soundtrack was recorded by the performance of a 44-piece orchestra, recorded twice and merged to sound like an 88-piece orchestra. The soundtrack was described by a press release issued by Electronic Arts as a collaboration between composer Inon Zur, vocalist Aubrey Ashburn, and BioWare Audio Director Simon Pressey, and performed by the Northwest Sinfonia. According to Zur, he intentionally made most of the soundtrack feel "dark", combining low brass and bass string instruments with ancient drums to express a feeling that is both heroic and demonic. The soundtrack was presented at a panel in the Hollywood Music in Media Interactive Conference in 2009 and was performed as part of the September 26 "A Night in Fantasia 2009" concert in Sydney, Australia, by the Eminence Symphony Orchestra. The song "I Am The One", written by Inon Zur and Aubrey Ashburn and performed by Aubrey Ashburn, won "Best Original Song – Video Game" in the Hollywood Music in Media Awards & Conference show held on November 19, 2009. Pressey also won the 2009 Hollywood Music in Media Award for "Outstanding Music Supervision - Video Game".

Origins contains a large amount of voice acting recorded in the US and the UK. Actors include Tim Russ, Steve Valentine, Kate Mulgrew, Simon Templeman, Mark Rolston, Tim Curry, Adam Howden, Nicola Bertram, and Claudia Black. In total, 144 voice actors worked on the game. A large part of these recordings became the ambient dialogue that takes place between non-player characters in the adventuring party, adding to their backstories and lending more credibility to the characters. Mark Darrah, the executive producer of BioWare, described the cast of characters the largest of any of their games at that time and hoped that using celebrities would add a layer of depth and complexity to the characters. The main protagonist is not voice-acted, as the team hoped that players would "reflect their own inner voice" when making decisions.

== Marketing and release ==
While the game was originally intended for PC, a console version was announced in 2008 by gaming magazine Game Informer. Prior to the announcement, Zeschuk suggested that the entire franchise has a "console future". The decision was made to bring the game to consoles to introduce it to a wider audience. Mike Laidlaw, the game's lead designer, considered creating the console versions' interface a challenge, as they had to convert the long and complex quickbar from the PC version to a more streamlined interface that could use the same actions with only few button presses. To that end, the team decided to map six different actions together, and allow players to customize the arrangement. Also, the console version does not allow the top-down view possible in the PC version.

The game was originally set to be released in early 2009 for Microsoft Windows, and later for PlayStation 3 and Xbox 360. The team partnered with Edge of Reality to develop the console versions of the game. However, its release date was pushed to the latter half of that year in order to have a simultaneous launch. BioWare announced that the game would be released on October 20, 2009, but pushed it back again to November 6, 2009, as the team wanted additional time to finalize some last-minute decisions. The PlayStation 3 version was at one point delayed to November 17 but did end up launching alongside the other versions. A Mac version of the game, developed by TransGaming, was released on December 21, 2009.

The Dragon Age Character Creator was released on October 13, 2009, allowing players to create a character in advance and import it into the full game upon release. BioWare also released a "developer-grade" toolset to allow extensive modification and customization of the game's PC version. Players can use these tools to craft new campaigns, quests, cinematics, and lip-syncing. On November 26, 2009, Electronic Arts announced a competition called Dragon Age: Warden's Quest. Contestants formed groups of four people and competed to adventure through the game's world, with the winning group receiving $12,500. The representatives from Hungary won the contest. The December 2009 issue of PC Gamer was bundled with a DVD copy of A Tale of Orzammar, a promotional campaign module for Origins. It explores the actions of a mercenary, the player character of the module, who is contracted by a dwarven nobleman to retrieve a valuable artifact from a ruined thaig within the Deep Roads.

In addition to the standard version, other editions of Origins were made available for purchase. The Collector's Edition came in a SteelBook with different artwork. Like the standard edition, the Collector's Edition included a redemption code to obtain the Stone Prisoner and Blood Dragon Armor downloadable content (DLC) for free, but also featured three additional exclusive in-game items, a bonus disc containing a making-of documentary, concept art, trailers, the game's original soundtrack, and a cloth map of Ferelden. Dragon Age: Origins supports released several DLC packs for the game. The content ranged from single in-game item packs to entirely new plot-related campaigns, which include The Stone Prisoner, Warden's Keep, Return to Ostagar, The Darkspawn Chronicles, Leliana's Song, The Golems of Amgarrak, and Witch Hunt. An expansion, titled Awakening, which is set in a new area called Amaranthine and introduces five new party members, was released on March 16, 2010. The "Ultimate Edition", which includes the base game, the Awakening expansion pack, and all 9 DLC packs, was released on October 26, 2010.

On March 9, 2011, Electronic Arts announced that players who pre-ordered Darkspore would receive a free copy of Origins. In 2012, to celebrate the first anniversary of Electronic Arts' own digital distribution software Origin, the game was made free to download alongside Battlefield: Bad Company 2 and Spore for a limited time. On October 8, 2015, it became free to download again for a limited time as part of Origin's On the House program.

== Reception ==
=== Critical reception ===
Reception

Aggregate score
Aggregator	Score
Metacritic	(PC) 91/100 (X360) 86/100 (PS3) 87/100

Review scores
Publication	Score
1Up.com	A
Game Informer	9/10
GameRevolution	A−
GameSpot	9.5/10
GameSpy	4.5/5
GamesRadar+	4.5/5
Giant Bomb	5/5
IGN	9/10
VideoGamer.com	8/10

Dragon Age: Origins received critical acclaim from major video game critics upon its release. While the game is considered to be virtually identical across all platforms, differences in user interface, graphical performance, and online content delivery have led the PC version to be reviewed more favorably than the PlayStation 3 and Xbox 360 versions; Metacritic ranks the PC, PlayStation 3, and Xbox 360 versions of the game with scores of 91, 87, and 86, respectively. ' The game's setting was well received by critics. Dave Snider from Giant Bomb thought that the setting felt traditional due to the presence of dwarves and elves, but that the world was beautifully executed. He also appreciated the small touches BioWare added to the world, noting the "French-tinged accent" of the Orlesian Empire humans. He added that the six origin stories and their unique dialogue and referencing throughout the game make the world feel cohesive. Kevin VanOrd from GameSpot made similar comments, stating that the new ideas added to a familiar world make it feel original and new. However, Jeff Haynes from IGN said that the origin stories were inconsistent, with missteps that make the world, while "rich and vivid", feel less believable. Joe Juba from Game Informer wrote that the world was well-realized with a deep history, which makes the game addicting, as players can sense their Warden's importance in the world.

The game's story and characters also received praise. Snider said that the story is driven by the characters and that the choices presented in the game were difficult, making him regret some choices for weeks after completing the game. He added that the game's main quest was well written, and its quality boosted by excellent voice acting; he called the performance of Claudia Black as Morrigan one of the best in the game. VanOrd commended the game's story, saying that it was memorable and crafted with care, successfully making players care about the game's world and characters. He added that the deep character development made every choice "momentous". GamesRadar thought that the story and the Warden's appearance felt generic, but that the story became more and more engrossing as it progressed. Nick Tan from GameRevolution liked the banter between companions as a humorous change of pace within the game. Gerald Villoria from GameSpy praised the exclusion of the moral system for making the characters feel more complex. Juba wrote that the story was good but predictable, not straying far from standard fantasy stories. Wesley Yin-Poole from VideoGamer.com called the story memorable, saying that it "leaves an itch in your mind", and has attracted players to return to the game "like an addict seeking a hit of relief." In commemoration of the 10th anniversary of Origins, Eric Van Allen of USGamer observed that companion relationships are more tense in Origins, and that most of the companions do not follow the Warden out of blind loyalty. Van Allen notes that the underlying tensions resulted in a game that "reveled in the moral grays", encouraging players to make decisions that aligns with their own feelings, unlike in Mass Effect.

As for the game's combat, Snider called it streamlined but said that players who do not want to use the pause mechanic would not be able to appreciate the game, as the combat requires both patience and strategy. He liked the game's third-person view more than the top-down view, saying that being able to view the sky made environments feel more complicated, and praised the high difficulty of boss battles, which task players to manage their stamina carefully. His conclusion was that Origins "feels like a real throwback to the good old days of PC role-playing epics." VanOrd said that the combat system was easily recognizable for players who have played other RPGs developed by BioWare. He added that players can have a lot of fun switching between characters, and agreed that the game had created thrilling boss battles. He praised the choice to have health and stamina replenish immediately after battles, as it sped up combat pace and flow. Tan also commended the combat, finding it a better system than other BioWare RPGs, but disliked the fact that characters can't step into water. Juba praised the amount of space for players to experiment with new skills and abilities, adding that the required focus and attention make combat very satisfying.

The game's graphics received mixed reviews. VanOrd was not impressed, stating that the environments do not look as good viewed from a top-down perspective, but he praised the art style and some of the game's "eye-catching" landmarks. Tan liked that the environments were varied and unique, saying that each level felt "vast" and filled with details. Villoria found its visual quality lacking when compared with that of Mass Effect 2, adding that the facial animation can feel wooden at times. However, he found the combat animation rewarding and satisfying. He further criticized the sex sequences as "off-putting". Yin-Poole said that the game's graphics were boring and generic, and called the sex scenes "anticlimactic" and poorly-executed. Both Villoria and Yin-Poole felt that the six-year development time was too long, considering the game's mediocre graphics.

GamesRadar estimated that there are more than 80 hours of content available in the game. Villoria called the world engaging, and its replay value very high, as players can play the story over and over again with a different origin. Juba agreed, as did Yin-Poole, who added that the way companions react to the player's decisions, as well as the six origin stories, significantly expand the game's longevity. John Walker, writing for Eurogamer, notes that the game's most frequent theme is the line between acculturation and enculturation. He praised the level of depth on display in Origins, calling it one of the most extraordinary gaming achievements he had seen up to that point.

=== Sales ===
Dragon Age: Origins topped Steam's sales chart on November 10, 2009. The Digital Deluxe version of the game was ranked first place, while the standard edition ranked second. The Xbox 360 version of the game was the ninth-best-selling game in the US according to the NPD Group, selling approximately 362,100 copies. According to John Riccitiello, CEO of Electronic Arts, the company is very satisfied with the sales of Origins; more than 1 million DLC packs for the game were sold before the end of 2009. In February 2010, Electronic Arts announced that more than 3.2 million copies of the game had been shipped.

=== Accolades ===
Origins gained recognition from several gaming publications for its achievements. At the AIAS' 13th Annual Interactive Achievement Awards (now known as the D.I.C.E. Awards), the game was honored as 2009's "Role-Playing/Massively Multiplayer Game of the Year", along with receiving a nomination for 2009's "Game of the Year". At the 2009 Spike Video Game Awards, Dragon Age: Origins received the Best PC Game and Best RPG awards. It was chosen as the PC Game of the Year, Best Xbox 360 RPG of the Year, Best Story of the Year, and Best PC Role-Playing Game of the Year by IGN. The game also received Giant Bomb's Best PC Game of 2009 award and Game of the Year 2009 and RPG of the Year awards from U.S. PC Gamer. At the inaugural Canadian Videogame Awards in 2010, it was crowned Game of the Year. In 2010, the game was included as one of the titles in the book 1001 Video Games You Must Play Before You Die.

== Legacy ==
The team did not expect the game to become successful and had never planned for sequels. Nonetheless, Origins spawned a franchise consisting of video games, comics, and novels. The game's sequel, Dragon Age II, which features a new protagonist and is set in the city of Kirkwall, was released in 2011. Players are able to transfer save data from Origins into the sequel; decisions that the player made during the course of Origins may impact the narrative of Dragon Age II. The third installment of the series, Dragon Age: Inquisition, was released in November 2014. Decisions made in Origins are also referenced in Inquisition; players may revisit the plot points from Origins by selecting their choices on the Tapestry feature on the online application Dragon Age Keep.

According to Eurogamer's Richard Cobbett, Origins marked the point at which western RPGs properly moved into the spotlight. He stated that the success of Origins proved that "a hardcore, older-fashioned game could still find a devoted audience", and that it "established a new baseline for the genre in much the same way as the original Baldur's Gate back in 1998".
