= Xenoblade Chronicles 2 =

2017 video game

- Icon artwork, featuring the protagonists Rex (left) and Pyra (right) looking at the Urayan Titan
- Developer: Monolith Soft (Note: Additional work, development support, and produced by Nintendo Entertainment Planning & Development)
- Publisher: Nintendo
- Directors: Koh Kojima; Genki Yokota
- Producers: Koh Kojima; Hitoshi Yamagami
- Designer: Koji Hayashi
- Programmer: Toshiaki Yajima
- Artists: Eiji Takahashi; Masatsugu Saito; Tetsuya Nomura
- Writers: Tetsuya Takahashi; Yuichiro Takeda; Kazuho Hyodo; Mamoru Ohta
- Composers: Yasunori Mitsuda; ACE (Note: Music group consisting of Tomori Kudo and Hiroyo "CHiCO" Yamanaka); Kenji Hiramatsu; Manami Kiyota
- Series: Xenoblade
- Platforms: Nintendo Switch; Nintendo Switch 2
- Release: Nintendo Switch: WW: December 1, 2017; Nintendo Switch 2: WW: July 30, 2026
- Genre: Action role-playing
- Mode: Single-player

Xenoblade Chronicles 2 (Note: Known in Japan as Xenoblade 2 (Japanese: ゼノブレイド2, Hepburn: Zenobureido Tsū)) is a 2017 action role-playing game developed by Monolith Soft and published by Nintendo for the Nintendo Switch. It is the third installment in the Xenoblade series and the sixth main entry in the Xeno series, and was released on December 1. Plans for the game began shortly before the launch of Xenoblade Chronicles X in 2014. Key developers from previous games returned, including franchise creator Tetsuya Takahashi and directors Koh Kojima and Genki Yokota. The team wanted to develop a story-driven game in the style of the original Xenoblade Chronicles. The game was announced in 2017 and was released worldwide the same year. As with Xenoblade Chronicles, the game was localized by Nintendo of Europe.

Xenoblade Chronicles 2 has gameplay that is similar to previous entries, but with an added summoning mechanic. It features a different setting and characters than the first Xenoblade Chronicles and marks the series' return to being story-driven, unlike the previous installment Xenoblade Chronicles X, which was focused on gameplay and open world exploration. Xenoblade Chronicles 2 takes place in Alrest, a world covered in a sea of clouds where humans live atop and inside large living creatures known as Titans. Some people known as Drivers can summon powerful beings known as Blades from crystals. After he is hired for a salvaging mission, a young salvager named Rex meets a legendary Blade named Pyra, indirectly becoming her Driver, and promises to take her to a fabled paradise called Elysium. Throughout their journey, Rex and his party are pursued by Torna, an organization who seeks Pyra's power for their own means.

The game received generally positive reviews. It was praised for its story, characters, themes, combat, music, environments, and scale; however, it was criticized for its gacha system, maps, tutorials, and technical issues. As of December 2020, it had sold over two million copies worldwide, making it the best-selling title in the Xeno series and Monolith Soft's most commercially successful game. Downloadable content was released throughout 2018, and a story-focused expansion was released in September of that year. This side story, Torna – The Golden Country, is set 500 years before the main game and features new gameplay mechanics. An updated port of Xenoblade Chronicles 2 for Nintendo Switch 2 was released in July 2026. A sequel, Xenoblade Chronicles 3, was released in July 2022.

== Gameplay ==
Xenoblade Chronicles 2 is an action role-playing game, and similar to previous games, the player controls a main character out of a party of three. The game is open world and has a day-and-night time cycle that affects in-game events, including quests, enemy strength, and item availability. Unlike the two previous titles, which consisted of a cohesive open world, the game takes place on several different Titans which the player travels between using fast travel.

Unlike previous entries, characters in the party also control additional beings known as Blades and can have three Blades active at a time, which determines their class. The game's Blades and skills are based on eight elements: Fire, Water, Wind, Ice, Electric, Earth, Light, and Dark. There are a total of 40 unique Rare Blades in the base game, with 11 being obtainable through downloadable content and New Game Plus. Most of the game's Blades are optional and not obtainable through the main story; among them are KOS-MOS and T-ELOS from the Xeno sub-series Xenosaga. The game's Challenge Mode, added through downloadable content, features Shulk and Fiora from Xenoblade Chronicles and Elma from Xenoblade Chronicles X as obtainable Blades.

=== Battle system ===
Xenoblade Chronicles 2 has an action-based battle system, where the player controls the current lead character in real-time and party members will "auto-attack" when enemies enter their attack radius. Each character has skills called "Arts" that can deal damage or inflict status effects. Both party members and enemies have a finite amount of health points, which is depleted by attacks. Combat is won when all enemies lose their HP, but is lost if the player character loses all their HP and is unable to be revived. Health can be restored through using healing Arts in battle and regenerates automatically outside of battle. Winning battles earns the player experience points, which strengthens characters as they level up. They also earn Skill Points, which are used to upgrade their stats and skills, and Weapon Points, which are used to power up their Arts. Losing a battle respawns the party at the most recently visited Landmark. Using Arts repeatedly allows use of special moves called Blade Specials, which when used in order creates a Blade Combo that does large amounts of damage and seals one of the enemy's abilities. A Driver Combo requires the party to inflict four status conditions on an enemy in a specific order: Break, Topple, Launch, and Smash. Finishing a Driver Combo does massive damage and causes the enemy to drop items. Performing a Driver Combo and a Blade Combo simultaneously creates a Fusion Combo, which greatly increases damage dealt and the Blade Combo's effects.

A "Party Gauge" fills up as party members attack. When full, the player can perform a Chain Attack, where characters perform attacks in succession. The Chain Attack can be made more effective by destroying elemental Orbs created by previously used Blade Specials, which deals additional damage and gives one additional Chain Attack round. The three-tiered gauge gradually depletes outside of battle, and one tier is used to revive incapacitated characters. An "aggro ring" around a character denotes they have gained aggro from enemies by attacking, leading to a strategic aspect of luring and diverting attention of enemies.

The player directly controls one of the Drivers in the party, who wields one of their Blades' Blade Weapons to auto-attack and perform Arts. Pressing an Art's button as an auto-attack connects allows them to "cancel" the ending animation of the auto-attack and use the Art immediately. After a cooldown, the Driver can Blade Switch to change their active Blade. Each Blade gives their Driver a different set of Arts, which is determined by the Blade's weapon type and the specific Driver.

== Plot ==
=== Setting and characters ===
The game is set in the fictional land of Alrest, a sea topped with clouds called the Cloud Sea, which is inhabited by massive creatures called Titans on which humanity lives. Legends claim that humanity once lived atop the World Tree, a massive tree at Alrest's center, in a paradise called Elysium with their creator, the Architect. However, they were exiled for unknown reasons and given the Titans to live on. Blades are powerful beings summoned from Core Crystals who channel power into their weapons through a force called Ether. Their masters are called Drivers; when a Driver dies, their Blade reverts to a Core Crystal and loses their memory. After some time, another Driver can awaken them if the crystal is intact. Due to the close spiritual bond between Driver and Blade, the personality of the former influences that of the latter. Two nations, Mor Ardain and Uraya are on the brink of war throughout the story.

The main character is Rex (Japanese: Hiro Shimono; English: Al Weaver), who is the Driver of the Aegis, a powerful and legendary Blade. The Aegis has two personalities, Pyra and Mythra (Japanese: Shino Shimoji; English: Skye Bennett), who share the same consciousness but have different abilities. As an orphan, Rex grew up in Fonsett Village on the Leftherian Archipelago, a place with several Titans that are close together and connected by bridges and other structures. Rex became very accustomed to the Cloud Sea and became a salvager to salvage parts found beneath it. He is very close with Azurda, a Titan whom he calls "Gramps" and lived a portion of his life upon. A group of Drivers called Torna set out to destroy the Aegis, leading Rex and the party to flee and find a way to the World Tree. Other important characters include Malos, another Aegis and the main antagonist; Jin, a Blade from Torna who aids Malos; Nia, a rebel from Torna, and her Blade Dromarch; Tora, a Nopon specializing in artificial Blades, and his Blade Poppi; Mòrag, a feared Driver from Mor Ardain, and her blade Brighid; and Zeke, the prince of the hermit country of Tantal, and his Blade Pandoria.

The downloadable content Torna – The Golden Country adds a new story, set 500 years before the game's events. It focuses on Lora and her Blade Jin, as well as their allies, in their battle against Malos in Torna, a country that is inaccessible in the main game.

=== Story ===
Rex, an orphaned salvager who collects treasure from below the Cloud Sea for money, is hired by Argentum Trade Guild Chairman Bana to aid the Drivers Jin, Malos, and Nia in the salvage of an ancient ship. In the ship, they find Pyra, a legendary Blade known as the Aegis. When Rex reaches out to touch Pyra's sword, Jin fatally stabs him. Rex awakens on a field with Pyra, who reveals they are in a memory of her old home Elysium. She asks him to bring her to Elysium and in exchange gives him half of her Core Crystal to revive him. With help from his Titan companion Azurda and Nia, who defects, Rex escapes to the Titan Gormott, but Azurda is wounded and reverts to his larval stage. Soon after, they arrive in Gormott's capital Torigoth and are joined by the Nopon Driver Tora and his artificial Blade Poppi. The group try to get to Elysium, but are stopped by the artifice Ophion and swallowed by the Titan Uraya.

After the group battles the mercenary Driver Vandham while escaping Uraya's stomach, he joins the party and Rex begins to look to him as a mentor. The group later learns that Jin and Malos are the leaders of Torna, a terrorist group named after a Titan destroyed in the Aegis War 494 years ago. Jin, an embittered veteran Blade of the Aegis War, and Malos, later revealed as the other Aegis, seek to destroy humanity by unleashing the artifice Aion on Elysium. During a battle with Malos and fellow Torna member Akhos, Vandham is killed and Pyra unveils her true form, Mythra. They have shared memory and consider themselves sisters, switching back and forth as needed.

The group's search for a way past Ophion leads them to join forces with Mòrag, special inquisitor of Mor Ardain and elder sister of the Ardainian Emperor, Niall, and Zeke, prince of Tantal. In Tantal, the group battles Jin, who forces Pyra to surrender. While Azurda leads the group to the third Aegis sword to save Pyra, Malos siphons Pyra's power to regain his full strength. After the group finds the third sword, phantoms of Pyra's former Driver nearly kill Rex, but he is deemed worthy of the third sword. The group confronts Jin and Malos at the Cliffs of Morytha, during which Rex unlocks Pyra and Mythra's true form, Pneuma. Rex, now matched with Jin's power, forces Malos to summon Ophion, who knocks the group into Morytha, the devastated land beneath Cloud Sea.

In Morytha, the group is forced to work with a weakened Jin. Malos' Driver, Amalthus, attacks by controlling various Titans. The group severs his connection to the Titans, only for him to kill all Torna members except Malos and Jin, with Jin defeating Amalthus as he dies. The group arrives in Elysium, which is revealed to be a long-dead wasteland, and meet the Architect, a scientist named Klaus who explains that he had discovered a device called the Conduit that sends objects into different dimensions, the use of which split his body in two and destroyed the old world. (Note: The Architect's other half was sent to an alternate dimension, the setting of the first Xenoblade Chronicles, where he became known as Zanza.)

Sensing that his other half is about to die, (Note: Klaus's other half, Zanza, is killed during the events of Xenoblade Chronicles.) which will result in his own death, Klaus sends the group to stop Malos, who was corrupted by Amalthus's malice and has obtained Aion. After Malos's defeat and death, Klaus dies, but not before granting Rex and the party a "final gift". Klaus's death causes Elysium to begin crumbling. Pneuma helps the group escape, but sacrifices herself to detonate the World Tree, preventing its debris from destroying Alrest. The group barely survives when Azurda, thanks to Pneuma, returns to his adult form and flies everyone down to Alrest. On returning to Alrest, the Cloud Sea fades to reveal a rejuvenated world, with the Titans merging to form a new landmass. Pyra and Mythra are revived in separate bodies and reunite with Rex.

== Development ==
The game was developed for the Nintendo Switch by Monolith Soft and is the third entry in their Xenoblade series, following the original Xenoblade Chronicles and Xenoblade Chronicles X. Plans for the game began in July 2014, during the latter half of development of Xenoblade Chronicles X. While the original Xenoblade Chronicles followed the typical structure of a general story-driven JRPG, Xenoblade Chronicles X received far less emphasis on story, and was organized in more of a mission-based structure, focused primarily on exploring the game's massive open world. The development team were unhappy upon hearing the fanbase complain about the changes, and started work on another story-driven title. Because the gameplay was more of a continuation of the first game, they decided to title it Xenoblade Chronicles 2. Xenoblade Chronicles 2 took shorter to develop than previous games, although development was difficult in the beginning due to a lack of finalization of the Switch's technical specifications. The architecture of Xenoblade Chronicles X was used for Xenoblade Chronicles 2 to speed up development. Another motivating factor was the agreement made by the team with Nintendo specifically to deliver the game early on in the Nintendo Switch's lifecycle.

One of Monolith Soft's objectives for the game was to give the characters a wider range of facial expressions compared to past Xenoblade titles. The lead character designer was Masatsugu Saito, who was designing characters for a video game for the first time. The developers chose him to give the protagonists a more expressive anime-like art style than prior Xenoblade entries, which featured a more realistic type of modeling that they found a bit too stiff. Square Enix artist Tetsuya Nomura was responsible for the characters within the Torna organization. Takahashi had wanted to work with Nomura, but as he was busy with other games at Square Enix, he hesitantly approached the company with the hopes of letting him work as a guest artist. To Takahashi's surprise, they accepted the negotiation. Other guest artists also contributed, such as Xeno series veterans Kunihiko Tanaka and Soraya Saga, who designed some of the game's Blades, weapon-like life forms. Tanaka designed a Blade version of KOS-MOS, one of the protagonists of the Xenosaga trilogy. The game's story was conceived by Takahashi, with assistance from screenwriters Yuichiro Takeda and Kazuho Hyodo. Takeda, who also worked as a writer on the last two Xenoblade games, stated that the writing techniques and workflow for Xenoblade Chronicles 2 was similar to that of a movie. While it is a sequel to Xenoblade Chronicles, it features a new world and cast of characters.

=== Music ===
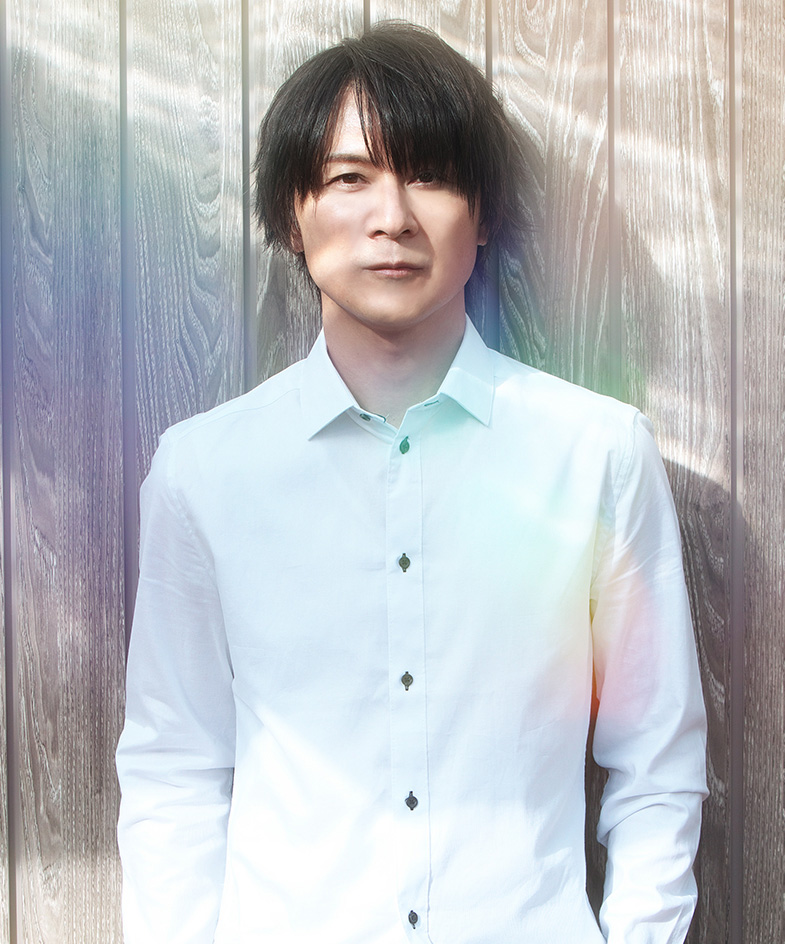
Composition of the game's soundtrack was led by Yasunori Mitsuda.

The game's original score was written by Yasunori Mitsuda, Kenji Hiramatsu, and Manami Kiyota and the duo of ACE (Tomori Kudo and Hiroyo Yamanaka). Mitsuda, who was also in charge of the audio budget, musician booking, schedule management, and sheet music proofreading, was first invited to the project by Takahashi in December 2014. Throughout the following year, Mitsuda and Takahashi held numerous meetings discussing the overall direction of the music, eventually inviting musical group ACE and Kenji Hiramatsu, who had also worked on the first Xenoblade Chronicles. At the meetings, each composer's contribution to the soundtrack was decided, with ACE primarily handling the field music, and Hiramatsu handling the battle music. According to Mitsuda, it was done in a way that would satisfy the fans, as they did not want to "ruin the image" that was set by the first Xenoblade Chronicles. With contributions from over 300 total musicians and 20,000 sheets worth of music, Mitsuda considered it the largest project he had ever worked on, with files and data from Pro Tools, his music production software, surpassing one terabyte in size. Overall, there were approximately 120 tracks recorded for the game, with around 25 of them being from Mitsuda.

The soundtrack features performances from the Slovak Bratislava Symphony Choir, as well as the Irish chamber choir Anúna. Mitsuda, who had always wanted to work with Anúna after becoming a fan in the 1990s, claimed that their performances for the game made him cry. Two tracks, including the ending theme written by Mitsuda, were sung by Jennifer Bird of the English acoustic duo Tomorrow Bird. Before recording, Mitsuda and Bird corresponded so that she could properly convey the characters' emotions through her singing. While recording, Bird was able to improvise melodic elements of her singing, something that did not usually happen with Mitsuda's arrangements.

== Release ==
The game was announced in January 2017 as part of Nintendo's detailed reveal of the Nintendo Switch, with a gameplay trailer being released on the same day. Similar to the original Xenoblade, the title was announced as Xenoblade 2 in Japan, but had Chronicles added to its name in English-speaking regions. The game was also a part of Nintendo's presentation at E3 2017, where it was reconfirmed for release by the end of 2017.

Like the original Xenoblade Chronicles, Nintendo's European division took up the reins for the English localization, who regularly communicated with Nintendo's Japanese and American divisions about decisions that could prove controversial, something that was previously an issue with Xenoblade Chronicles X. Unlike the first two games, the localization process took place during development rather than after and was ready in time for a simultaneous worldwide launch on December 1, 2017. Days before the game's launch, a promotional music video featuring a vocal track from the game by Mitsuda, "Shadow of the Lowlands", was uploaded onto Nintendo's official YouTube accounts. The video features a performance by Anúna, and was filmed and directed by Michael McGlynn, leader of the group. An official soundtrack, consisting of over a hundred tracks, was released in both physical and digital formats on May 23, 2018. Additional content was added through an expansion pass which released through 2018. Added content includes new items, quests, recruitable Blades, and a challenge battle mode. New story-based content, Xenoblade Chronicles 2: Torna – The Golden Country, was released digitally as part of the expansion pass on September 14, 2018, and as a standalone retail release a week later.

A costume based on Rex was added to The Legend of Zelda: Breath of the Wild a few weeks ahead of the game's launch. Characters from Xenoblade Chronicles 2 were considered for a position as a playable fighter in Super Smash Bros. Ultimate's initial roster, but they were ultimately passed over due to poor timing. According to director Masahiro Sakurai, this was because the game was announced to the public far too late in the development of Ultimate. Pyra and Mythra were eventually added to the roster as a 2-in-1 fighter via downloadable content in March 2021, along with a new stage and several music tracks. While Rex was considered, Sakurai deemed it unfeasible to control both of them at the same time, likening the situation to that of the Ice Climbers, so he was reduced to supportive roles in Pyra and Mythra's moveset.

On June 9, 2026, during a Nintendo Direct presentation, Nintendo announced updated releases of the Xenoblade Chronicles trilogy for Nintendo Switch 2. Xenoblade Chronicles 2 — Nintendo Switch 2 Edition was released on July 30, 2026, with a physical release set to follow on October 1. The port features support for higher framerate and resolution, including in cutscenes, and adds several new features, including new cosmetics for Pyra and Mythra, MOMO from the Xenosaga series as an additional Blade, and a new action battle mode titled "Merc Assault" in which players control up to six of their Blades at a time. The standalone version of Torna – The Golden Country received a free update on the same day adding the framerate and resolution enhancements.

== Reception ==
=== Pre-launch ===
Some critics called the initial reveal of the game "unexpected", with Jeremy Parish of USGamer favorably comparing it to Chrono Cross. At the Gamescom event in August 2017, the game received positive early hands-on impressions from gaming sites, being praised for its streamlined combat system and environments.

=== Post-launch ===
Reception

Aggregate scores
Aggregator	Score
Metacritic	83/100
OpenCritic	80% recommend

Review scores
Publication	Score
4Players	90%
Destructoid	8/10
Edge	7/10
Electronic Gaming Monthly	7/10
Eurogamer	4/5
Famitsu	35/40
Game Informer	7.5/10
GameRevolution	4.5/5
GameSpot	7/10
GamesTM	80%
Hardcore Gamer	3.5/5
IGN	8.5/10
Nintendo Life	9/10
Nintendo World Report	9.5/10
USgamer	4.5/5

Upon release, Xenoblade Chronicles 2 received "generally favorable reviews" according to review aggregator website Metacritic, which gave it an overall score of 83% on 93 reviews. The game's story, characters, complex combat system, soundtrack, amount of content, and the beauty and size of the environments were largely praised. John Rairdin of Nintendo World Report considered the game "one of the finest JRPGs of the generation and perhaps of all time" and was highly praising the music, "diverse world", "fresh and engaging combat", and "thrilling storyline". He also expressed doubt that there would be a better JRPG for the Switch. Game Revolution's Jason Faulkner called the game "a joy to review", stating that it was "full of wonder, exploration, and character". Hiroshi Noguchi writing for IGN Japan gave a very positive review, stating that it "offers a timeless tale of adventure and an incredibly deep battle system." Alex Fuller for RPGamer was enthusiastically supportive of the game, saying "2017 has been one of the greatest years in RPG history; Xenoblade Chronicles 2 caps that off in mesmerising fashion by being one of the finest titles of the year".

Nadia Oxford of USgamer stated that Xenoblade Chronicles 2 "captures nearly everything that made the first game great, borrows the best elements from Chronicles X, and then improves on much of it. Though Blades change up how you fight in Chronicles 2, the game spills over with the traits that make the first Chronicles game a stand-out experience. More story, more enemies to scrap with, more landscapes to tread across. Chronicles 2 is a dialogue-heavy game, but there are many points where Monolith Soft lets its environments narrate the seriousness of Alrest's plight." She highly praised the game's story, stating "The narrative explores patriotism, war, environmental decline, refugees, and examines the little people who get caught in the crush when big powers scrap with one another. There are also a number of moral and philosophical questions raised about Blades [...] Are Blades humanity's partners, or their slaves?" GamesTM called the game the "apex of open-world design", and the exploration made up for any minor issues.

Leif Johnson of IGN praised the game and called it a "standout RPG that manages to keep its story, combat, and exploration interesting over the course of at least 70 hours of adventure through an impressively varied and rich world", though conceded a few frustrations with the game, including a confusing minimap that sometimes led to the reviewer getting lost. Shubhankar Parijat of GamingBolt called it ""A must-play for all Nintendo Switch owners"" and "one of the best JRPGs of this generation" and calling its world "vast and beautiful", its story "complex and layered", and its combat "intricate and addictive", while also noting that the game was occasionally held back by "obtuse design choices" and "a simple lack of polish".

However, the game did have its criticisms. Jason Schreier of Kotaku, who had also disliked the original Xenoblade Chronicles, gave a largely negative review, calling the game "dull, dreary, overly complicated, and unconcerned with wasting the player's time". He heavily criticized the writing, technical issues, pacing, as well as the gameplay, which he considered overly extensive and complicated as well as the "clunky" menus. He was also critical of the story, calling it "an unsubtle script that stomps all over even the most interesting story scenes". However, he praised the "spectacular" music and "beautifully realized" environments. Noguchi of IGN Japan criticized some of the game's mechanics not being well explained and the amount of bugs found in the game at launch, but was looking forward to the early patch of the game to fix many of these issues. Jed Pressgrove, however, writing for Slant Magazine was highly critical of the large amount of tutorials found in the game, stating "It's very difficult, if not impossible, to feel like you're in a different world, much less experiencing a story, when such elements call attention to the contrived nature of the whole shebang." Pressgrove did approve of the game's "rousing soundtrack", however. Washington Post's Harold Goldberg found the "intricate, unfriendly gameplay" inaccessible, saying "A wondrous game lies in there somewhere.. it's too often too difficult to swim through", and that he wouldn't play the game again after completing it.

Xenoblade Chronicles 2 won awards for excellence at both the 2019 Japan Game Awards and the 2018 Famitsu Awards. The game was also nominated for "Best RPG" at IGN's Best of 2017 Awards, and a nomination for game engineering at the National Academy of Video Game Trade Reviewer Awards in 2018.

=== Sales ===
The game sold nearly 98,000 copies in its first week in Japan, and 168,000 after a month. In the United Kingdom, the game positioned itself at number 19 overall in its first week, which made it debut 9 places higher over Xenoblade Chronicles X. In the United States, it charted at number 16 for the month of December. Within a month, the game had sold over a million copies worldwide.

By April 2018, Xenoblade Chronicles 2 had become the best selling game in the Xeno franchise, and the best-selling game of Monolith Soft altogether. In September 2018, Takahashi stated: "Xenoblade Chronicles 2 exceeded my expectations. We really saw more people pick the game up and experience it in the North American and European territories than we thought would do so... the sales of the Torna DLC are exceeding our expectations as well." In an interview with 4Gamer, Takahashi revealed that Xenoblade Chronicles 2 had sold 1.73 million units worldwide as of March 2019. The 2023 CESA Games White Papers revealed that Xenoblade Chronicles 2 had sold 2.70 million units worldwide, as of December 31, 2022.
