= Dragon Age: Origins – Awakening =

- Developer(s): BioWare
- Publisher(s): Electronic Arts
- Producer(s): Fernando Melo
- Designer(s): Ferret Baudoin
- Programmer(s): Owen Borstad
- Artist(s): Dean Andersen; Alistair McNally
- Writer(s): David Gaider; Sheryl Chee
- Composer(s): Inon Zur
- Series: Dragon Age
- Engine: Eclipse Engine
- Platform(s): Mac OS X; PlayStation 3; Windows; Xbox 360
- Release: NA: March 16, 2010; PAL: March 18, 2010
- Genre(s): Role-playing
- Mode(s): Single-player

Dragon Age: Origins – Awakening is the expansion for the role-playing video game Dragon Age: Origins. Awakening adds a new campaign that takes place during the aftermath of Dragon Age: Origins. The game features new class specializations and skills for the player to develop. Awakening was released for Microsoft Windows, OS X, PlayStation 3 and Xbox 360 on March 16, 2010, in North America, March 18 in Europe, and March 19 in the United Kingdom. It was released for the Mac on August 31, 2010.

== Gameplay ==
The player has the option to either import their character from the main game or start over as a Warden from Orlais, starting a new origin story. If a new character is created, the story from the main game is set to a default ending. If the character is imported, the story in Awakening will continue from that determined by the player in Origins and the character will retain their attributes, skills, spells etc. as well as certain equipment. The expansion continues the story, including five new recruitable party members and Oghren from Dragon Age: Origins, new spells and abilities, a raise in the level cap, new enemies such as the Inferno Golem and the Queen of the Blackmarsh, and new items. There are no romances available.

== Synopsis ==
=== Plot ===
Set six months after the events of Dragon Age: Origins in the land of Amaranthine, Dragon Age: Origins - Awakening places the player in the role of a Grey Warden trying to rebuild the order while also dealing with political matters as the Arl of Amaranthine.

Named the Warden Commander, the player travels to Vigil's Keep to assume command of the Grey Wardens there. However, the keep is discovered to have been assaulted by Darkspawn, and something amiss is noticed as such an organized attack would have taken an intelligent leader to direct, something thought impossible without the presence of an Archdemon. The player is able to clear the keep with the aid of Mhairi, an able female warrior and prospective Grey Warden, and two others: Anders, an apostate mage who seeks refuge away from the Tower of Magi, and Oghren, a Dwarven berserker returning from Dragon Age: Origins. A new, talking Darkspawn, a Disciple, is discovered to have been the leader of the enemy forces and is defeated. With the keep secured, the player then sets forth on a journey to help garner support for the Grey Wardens and new recruits to join the order's ranks while also looking for clues as to solve the mystery of the intelligent Darkspawn. Mhairi, Anders and Oghren all undergo the Joining - Mhairi dies while the other two survive.

Throughout the game, the player journeys to several locations and recruits party members who may undergo the Joining ritual to become Grey Wardens. These members are: Nathaniel Howe, an assassin and son of Arl Rendon Howe from Origins; Velanna, a Dalish Mage exiled from her clan; Sigrun, a dwarf and member of the Legion of the Dead; and Justice, a spirit trapped in the body of a deceased Grey Warden. Along his or her travels, the player meets the "Architect", a strange darkspawn figure whose intentions remain unclear until the end of the game, and learns about the "Mother", who is a sentient broodmother, a breed of darkspawn capable of spawning thousands of other darkspawn.

After recruiting all available party members, the player learns of an oncoming war, as Darkspawn advance towards the city of Amaranthine. The player travels to the city with a small band of allies, but soon learns of another Darkspawn force that is headed for Vigil's Keep. Depending on his or her decisions, the player may either order Amaranthine to be burned down after deeming it too late to be saved, causing all the Darkspawn and civilians inside to die, and head back to the Keep, or stay and fight to rid Amaranthine of Darkspawn forces, thus forcing Vigil's Keep to be on its own against the Darkspawn attack there.

Regardless of his or her choice, the player aids in the destruction of the enemy forces and then travels to Drake's Fall, where the "Mother" is presumed to be residing. The player meets the "Architect" once again, and learns of his intention to free the Darkspawn from the impulse to commence a Blight and annihilate the corrupted "Mother." The player may either ally with the "Architect" or kill him. He or she then locates the "Mother", where he or she learns of the ongoing antagonism between the "Architect" and the "Mother" and finds out that the "Architect" had been the one who had awakened the archdemon from the main game after a failed experiment. Ultimately, the player kills the "Mother."

After the Mother is defeated a slideshow detailing the outcomes of the player's choices will be shown, which includes the states of Vigil's Keep and Amaranthine, the fates of each of the companions, and the ultimate fate of the Warden Commander.

== Reception ==
Reception

Aggregate score
| Aggregator | Score |
|---|---|
| Metacritic | PC: 82/100; PS3: 80/100; X360: 80/100 |

Review scores
| Publication | Score |
|---|---|
| GameSpot | 8.0/10 |
| IGN | 8.5/10 |

Dragon Age: Origins – Awakening received mostly positive reviews. It received a score of 8.0 out of 10 from GameSpot, complimented for its combat and questing but criticized for its "disappointing story" and less memorable characters. IGN gave the expansion a score of 8.5 out of 10 stating that the game has "an epic story that has loads of surprises and lots of momentum, but too bad it doesn't feel that good compared to the original."
