= Xeno (series) =

- The logo of the Xenoblade series. Each series in the Xeno franchise has a stylistically distinct logo.
- Genre: Role-playing video game
- Developers: Square, Monolith Soft
- Publishers: Square, Bandai Namco, Nintendo
- Creators: Tetsuya Takahashi, Soraya Saga
- Platforms: PlayStation, PlayStation 2, Mobile, Nintendo DS, New Nintendo 3DS, Wii, Wii U, Nintendo Switch, Nintendo Switch 2
- First release: Xenogears; February 11, 1998
- Latest release: Xenoblade Chronicles X: Definitive Edition; March 20, 2025
- Spin-offs: Xenosaga; Xenoblade

Xeno (Note: Japanese: ゼノ, Hepburn: Zeno) is a Japanese science fantasy video game franchise created by Tetsuya Takahashi. The first entry was developed by Square, and subsequent entries have been developed by Monolith Soft, a company founded by Takahashi after he left Square in 1999. While the various games have no direct story connections, they have common thematic links and all sport the "Xeno" prefix, which Takahashi has variously described as a means of identifying his games and a symbolic representation of the series. All the games in the Xeno meta series take place within a science fiction setting with some fantasy elements, with its stories frequently featuring psychological, philosophical, and religious themes.

The first title, Xenogears, was originally proposed as a storyline for Final Fantasy VII, as well as a sequel to the 1995 RPG Chrono Trigger; however, it was allowed to be developed as its own project. After Square shifted its focus onto the Final Fantasy series, Takahashi and several other Xenogears staff founded Monolith Soft and began work on the Xenosaga games. Both Xenogears and Xenosaga were intended to be six-part series, but differing circumstances caused plans to be cut down. After the premature end of the Xenosaga series, Monolith Soft began developing Xenoblade, initially intended to be an original title. The games of the Xeno franchise have generally sold well and received positive press worldwide.

== Games ==
Release timeline
1998	Xenogears
1999–2001
2002	Xenosaga Episode I
2003
2004	Xenosaga Freaks
2004	Xenosaga Episode II
2004	Xenosaga: Pied Piper
2005
2006	Xenosaga I & II
2006	Xenosaga Episode III
2007–2009
2010	Xenoblade Chronicles
2011–2014
2015	Xenoblade Chronicles X
2016
2017	Xenoblade Chronicles 2
2018	Xenoblade Chronicles 2: Torna – The Golden Country
2019
2020	Xenoblade Chronicles: Definitive Edition
2021
2022	Xenoblade Chronicles 3
2023–2024
2025	Xenoblade Chronicles X: Definitive Edition
2026
2027	Xenoblade Genesis

Xenogears was released for the PlayStation in 1998 in Japan and North America. Set in an alien world with warring rival human empires, the protagonist Fei Fong Wong is drawn into the battle against Deus, an ancient machine weapon worshiped as a god. The gameplay features turn-based combat on foot and inside large bipedal mechs called "Gears". Originally planned as part of a six-episode story, Xenogears represented the fifth episode in the saga. Xenogears is owned by Square Enix.

The Xenosaga series consists of a main trilogy of role-playing games for the PlayStation 2, as well as spin-off titles that form part of the main narrative. The games were released between 2002 and 2006. The Xenosaga trilogy boast similar gameplay to Xenogears, although the balance of story and gameplay underwent drastic revisions for the second game. As with Xenogears, Xenosaga was planned as a six-episode story, but was cut down to a trilogy due to various factors. Xenosaga is not a direct continuation or prequel to Xenogears despite similarities, instead being a spiritual successor. The Xenosaga series is owned by Bandai Namco Entertainment.

Xenoblade currently spans four games: Xenoblade Chronicles (2010), the spiritual successor Xenoblade Chronicles X (2015), Xenoblade Chronicles 2 (2017), and Xenoblade Chronicles 3 (2022), as well as expansions for the latter two titles. A fifth game, Xenoblade Genesis (2027), is in development. The games employ an action-based battle system, incorporating cooldown abilities and quick-time commands. Xenoblade Chronicles X also incorporates traversal using giant mechs known as Skells. While Xenoblade Chronicles adopts a story-driven design, Xenoblade Chronicles X uses a non-linear structure within an open world. The Skells were also a deliberate callback to the Gears of Xenogears. The Xenoblade series is owned by Nintendo and its subsidiary Monolith Soft.

== Themes ==
The "Xeno" prefix, which means something strange or foreign to a group, was used in connection with the game's themes. The Xeno title has been repeated throughout the series: in an interview concerning Xenoblade Chronicles, director Tetsuya Takahashi said that the prefix had become a symbol referencing the previous works of Monolith Soft. Later still, the Xeno title was described as a means of distinguishing Takahashi's work, phrased by the interviewer as a "director's signature". All of the games in the series have made use of a science fiction premise, although this has sometimes been placed in the background within settings more common to the fantasy genre.

According to Takahashi, each game in the series revolves around different themes. Xenogears, Xenosaga, and Xenoblade series make extensive use of various religious and philosophical themes. Xenogears incorporated concepts from the works of Friedrich Nietzsche, Sigmund Freud and Carl Jung. A particular reference is protagonist Fei, whose personality is split into multiple parts, one of which is a violent persona known as "Id". In addition, Xenogears uses motifs and references to abrahamic belief systems, along with other concepts such as reincarnation. During the development stage, main antagonist Deus' Japanese name was to have been "Yahweh", but the team were convinced by localization lead Richard Honeywood not to use it, and instead made the name a pun on a piece of Japanese slang.

The Xenosaga series made heavy use of biblical elements, particularly the New Testament. There are also extensive references to Gnosticism, Judaism and Jungian psychology. The games' principal writer said that the themes also paralleled many other world religions. The works of Nietzsche were also referenced in the Xenosaga games: the first Xenosaga drew its main theme from the "Will to power", a concept coined by Nietzsche to describe the driving motivation of humanity. The subtitles of each main Xenosaga also reference the ideas and works of Nietzsche.

The themes of Xenoblade focused on the main characters overcoming a pre-determined fate and finding the meaning of human existence, along with what Takahashi described as "contrasting the realms of the micro and the macro". Xenoblade Chronicles X was a deliberate move away from this style of storytelling and the incorporation of philosophical themes: according to Takahashi, the concept was to create a solid gameplay foundation on which to base a future work which would feature a stronger story. Despite this, it covered similar thematic ground to Xenoblade Chronicles.

== Development ==
Xenogears, the first entry in what would become the Xeno series, was first proposed to Square by Tetsuya Takahashi and his wife, known under the pseudonym Soraya Saga, as a potential storyline for Final Fantasy VII. While it was considered too mature for the Final Fantasy series, Takahashi was allowed to create an original work based on the premise. After initially attempting to create a sequel to Chrono Trigger, Takahashi made the project entirely unique, beginning development approximately two years prior to its release. While a second Xenogears game was being planned, Square decided to focus on the Final Fantasy series, a decision that Takahashi did not agree with. Leaving Square, he established Monolith Soft in 1999 along with multiple other Xenogears staff. Monolith Soft was founded so that Takahashi could continue developing the concepts of Xenogears, and with funding from Namco, the team began development on the first Xenosaga.

The development cycle of the Xenosaga games was troubled: after the first game commercially underperformed, the development staff was changed, the proposed six-part series was cut down by half, and the second installment shifted focus from its story to its gameplay. After outcry, the third game shifted again in an attempt to balance story and gameplay while bringing the Xenosaga story to a close. After the failure of Xenosaga, staff at Monolith Soft were in a state of low morale. During the development of Disaster: Day of Crisis, Takahashi was struck with the idea of setting a game on the bodies of two frozen gods. After constructing a concept model for it with another member of staff, Monolith Soft began development. While originally intended to be an original title called Monado: The Beginning of the World, Nintendo's then-CEO Satoru Iwata had the title changed to reflect Takahashi's previous games and hard work on the title, bringing the new game into the Xeno series. Working within deliberate restrictions and moving away from the previous cutscene-heavy style of Xenogears, Monolith Soft worked hard to make the game a balance between gameplay and story. For Xenoblade Chronicles X, the developers focused on the gameplay aspect, in particular creating an open world and online elements within a new set of self-imposed restrictions.

Near the release date of Xenoblade Chronicles X, Takahashi stated that, if he were given the opportunity to make another game in the Xenoblade series, he would hope to create another traditional JRPG-style video game similar to Xenoblade Chronicles. He stated that he hoped to continue the series by exploring many different settings instead of being confined to a specific genre. He also stated that he would like to use the core system set up in Xenoblade Chronicles X to further expand on the story and thematic elements for their next project. Two years later, Xenoblade Chronicles 2 was released which returned to the story-driven JRPG style found in Xenoblade Chronicles. This was continued in Xenoblade Chronicles 3, released in 2022, which concluded the story arc established in Xenoblade Chronicles.

=== Overseas release ===
At the time of its development, Square said that Xenogears would likely not release in the west due to the religious content. The localization proved especially challenging, with the original translators either quitting the project or requesting transferral to other projects. This meant that Honeywood was under heavy pressure to render the game into English while both keeping it faithful to the original and stepping round some of the sensitive religious issues the title evoked. Although all three main Xenosaga entries were released in Japan and North America, the first and the third game did not release in Europe, and the spin-offs remained exclusive to Japan.

Xenoblade Chronicles was originally not announced for an overseas release, and despite being announced for release in Europe, its North American release was doubtful enough that a fan campaign dubbed Operation Rainfall began working to have the game, along with two other Wii role-playing games, released overseas. Later, during the run-up to the release of Xenoblade Chronicles X, Takahashi stated that Xenoblade Chronicles was designed with an international audience in mind, and that he was pleased Xenoblade Chronicles X was receiving a western release in the same year as Japan.

The games have also undergone censorship. A sexually explicit scene featured in Xenosaga was toned down for its western release. The first and third Xenosaga games also received changes for their western release: in the first game, a scene between main antagonist Albedo and the character MOMO was toned down significantly; and the third game had all visible blood removed, which ended up making some scenes confusing. Xenoblade Chronicles X also received censorship in the form of the character Lin, who had her clothing made less sexually provocative.

== In other media ==
An anime was produced by Namco and Monoliftsoft based on Xenosaga, titled Xenosaga: The Animation, premiered on TV Asahi in Japan in January 2005. The story is based on Episode I: Der Wille zur Macht. The series was licensed by ADV Films in June 2007 for $120,000.

Several characters from the Xeno series have been featured in the Project X Zone games, namely KOS-MOS and T-elos from the Xenosaga series and Fiora and Metal Face from the Xenoblade series.

Shulk, the main protagonist of Xenoblade Chronicles, is a playable character in Super Smash Bros. for Nintendo 3DS and Wii U, an entry in Nintendo's crossover fighting game series Super Smash Bros.. He later returned in the sequel Super Smash Bros. Ultimate. Additionally, Shulk is available as a Mystery Mushroom costume in Super Mario Maker and as a color palette in Yoshi's Woolly World.

The outfit of Xenoblade Chronicles 2's protagonist, Rex, is available as an extra costume for Link in The Legend of Zelda: Breath of the Wild. It also appears as a wearable outfit for a Mii Fighter in Super Smash Bros. Ultimate as DLC. Pyra and Mythra from Xenoblade Chronicles 2 were released as DLC characters for Super Smash Bros. Ultimate in March 2021.

Songs from Xenogears would appear as DLC for Theatrhythm Final Bar Line.

== Reception ==
Aggregate review scores
Game	Metacritic
Xenogears	(PS1) 84
Xenosaga Episode I	(PS2) 83
Xenosaga Episode II	(PS2) 73
Xenosaga Episode III	(PS2) 81
Xenoblade Chronicles	(Wii) 92
Xenoblade Chronicles 3D	(3DS) 86
Xenoblade Chronicles X	(WIIU) 84
Xenoblade Chronicles 2	(NS) 83
Xenoblade Chronicles 2: Torna – The Golden Country	(NS) 80
Xenoblade Chronicles: Definitive Edition	(NS) 89
Xenoblade Chronicles 3	(NS) 89
Xenoblade Chronicles 3: Future Redeemed	(NS) 92
Xenoblade Chronicles X: Definitive Edition	(NS) 87

The Xeno series has been very highly reviewed and praised by critics. IGN described Xenogears as the "hands-down best RPG" of the year, praising the storyline, gameplay, graphics, presentation, and soundtrack. The game placed 16th in Famitsu’s 2006 poll and 32nd in IGN’s poll of the greatest games of all time. Famitsu praised the world and character development of Xenosaga Episode I, while GamePro stated that the story and characters "[rivaled] that of a good, hard, science-fiction novel or the best anime series available". Xenosaga Episode II was the least praised title of the series, with Eurogamer still praising its characters and plot, but finding the story uncomfortably long and complicated, requiring too much foreknowledge of the original game to be enjoyable for series newcomers. GamePro believed that Episode 2 had changed game mechanics to make the title less approachable than the previous game, and GameSpot felt that the character growth system was simplified too much and made the game shorter as well. Xenosaga Episode III was met with divided feelings, as some such as Simon Parkin of Eurogamer, felt that the sheer number of philosophical and religious elements in the story both stifled any relatable narrative and robbed the characters of any personality; despite this he felt the ending successfully tied up remaining narrative threads from previous games. Famitsu enjoyed the narrative's presentation, but noted the lack of a focused narrative due to the number of story threads needing addressing. IGN enjoyed the combat system and its blending of elements from past games, but was disappointed that no new elements had been added. After lower sales and still mixed reception, the Xenosaga development team's morale was low. To help revive their spirit, they started making a new game that eventually became Xenoblade Chronicles.

Xenoblade is thus far the highest praised series title by critics, earning perfect scores from Digital Spy, Joystiq, GamePro and RPGamer, and near-perfect scores from most other video gaming websites and magazines. (Note: Edge, Eurogamer, Famitsu, Game Informer, GameSpot (for Wii), GamesRadar (for Wii), GamesTM, GameTrailers, IGN (for Wii), PALGN, and RPGFan.) The game received "universal acclaim", according to review aggregator Metacritic. It was also nominated for many awards, such as the 2011 Japan Game Awards where the title received the "Excellence" award. It was also nominated for many “Best RPG” and Best Wii/Wii U Game”. It was also nominated by IGN in the "Best Overall Role-playing Game" and "Best Overall Story" categories. Xenoblade Chronicles X also had its admirers, with Japanese gaming publication Dengeki giving the game a positive review, referring to it as a masterpiece; they praised the gameplay, detailed world, story direction, and music, and said it has a "very high degree of perfection". Nintendo Life praised the game's battle system, deep upgrade pathways, vast world size, and graphics, but criticized the occasional difficulty spike and fetch quest. GameSpot stated that, of "all the open-world games to come out this year, Xenoblade Chronicles X may be the most formidable" as a "truly enormous game, both in scale and scope," praising the landscapes, creature design, unlockables and quests, combat, and character progression and customization, but criticizing the inconsistent soundtrack, ambiguous systems, and disappointing story. Xenoblade Chronicles 2 received wide acclaim. John Rairdin of Nintendo World Report, who gave a 9.5 rating out of 10 to the title, considered the game "one of the finest JRPGs of the generation and perhaps of all time" and highly praising the music, "diverse world", "fresh and engaging combat", and "thrilling storyline", stating: "Washing over any minor issues is one of the most engaging stories I’ve ever played, a vastly improved and fun combat system, and an out-of-this-world soundtrack. It sets a precedent for JRPGs on the Switch that I doubt will be topped." IGN Japan gave a very positive review, stating that it "offers a timeless tale of adventure and an incredibly deep battle system." However, they criticized the fact that "its mechanics are not always well explained". Its expansion, Xenoblade Chronicles 2: Torna – The Golden Country, was positively received, with some critics expressing enthusiasm for the story expansion. Other critics cited endearing, relatable characters, interesting story, and an improved battle system.

=== Sales ===
Xenogears shipped over one million copies worldwide by March 2003, with 910,000 being shipped in Japan and 280,000 overseas. The first Xenosaga was a commercial success in Japan, selling 450,000 units. It was also reported by Namco as one of their better-selling games overseas. The second Xenosaga sold over 256,000 copies in Japan by the end of 2004, and like its predecessor was considered commercially successful overseas. The third Xenosaga sold 343,000 units in all territories by the third quarter of 2006. Ultimately, the Xenosaga series was considered a commercial disappointment for Namco. Xenoblade Chronicles met with strong sales in Japan despite being released near to the end of its console's life cycle, and was commercially successful in the UK and North America. Despite low sales compared to other console titles, Xenoblade Chronicles X was also successful, with the majority of its sales coming from outside of Japan. Xenoblade Chronicles 2 would become one of the highest selling games for the Nintendo Switch for 2017 and the highest selling Xeno series title of all time, with 1.53 million units sold by 2018. As of December 2022, Xenoblade Chronicles 3 has sold 1.86 million units.
