= Pyra and Mythra =

Fictional characters

- Xenoblade characters
- Pyra (left) and Mythra (right) as they appear in Super Smash Bros. Ultimate
- First game: Xenoblade Chronicles 2 (2017)
- Designed by: Masatsugu Saito
- Voiced by: EN: Skye Bennett; JA: Shino Shimoji

In-universe information
- Race: Blade (Aegis)
- Weapon: Sword
- Children: Glimmer (Pyra); Shimmer (Mythra)

Pyra and Mythra, known in Japan as Homura (Japanese: ホムラ, lit. 'flame') and Hikari (Japanese: ヒカリ, lit. 'light'), are characters from the 2017 action role-playing game Xenoblade Chronicles 2, developed by Monolith Soft and published by Nintendo. In the game, Pyra and Mythra are described as two forms of the Aegis Blade sharing one body. The characters were designed by Masatsugu Saito, and voiced by Skye Bennett in English and Shino Shimoji in Japanese.

Pyra and Mythra were later featured as a DLC character in 2018's crossover fighting game Super Smash Bros. Ultimate as a joint playable fighter, able to be switched with each other during battles, with Pyra specializing in slower, high-damage fire-based attacks and Mythra in faster, combo-oriented light-based abilities. For the game, their designs were revised to be less revealing under the direction of game director Masahiro Sakurai.

Critical opinions on Pyra and Mythra have been diverse, with some critics appreciating them for their narrative role and gameplay mechanics, and others disliking their character designs.

== Appearances ==
Pyra and Mythra are introduced as the deuteragonists of Xenoblade Chronicles 2. They are two forms of the Aegis, a special and particularly powerful type of Blade - autonomous beings summoned from Core Crystals, with those who wield their power being known as Drivers. Five hundred years after Pyra was sealed away, Rex, the game's main character, is a salvager who first encounters her after being hired to join an expedition to retrieve her from a sunken ship brought up from underwater. When Rex attempts to examine the container Pyra is in, he is stabbed and mortally wounded by fellow expedition member Jin. Pyra reaches out to Rex and bonds with him, implanting part of her Core Crystal in his chest; he subsequently becomes her Driver. Mythra is introduced later in the story, awakening from within Pyra during a battle with Jin's allies Malos and Akhos. Pyra and Mythra exist as two personalities sharing one body; Mythra is the original persona, while Pyra was created later as an alternative to limit Mythra's power. The division is not permanent, and the two switch control of the body at different points in the narrative. Temperamentally, Pyra is calm and gentle, while Mythra is more impulsive and outspoken.

At the end of Xenoblade Chronicles 2, Pyra and Mythra merge into a single being, Pneuma, and sacrifice themselves to prevent the World Tree space station from destroying the world of Alrest as it collapses. They are later resurrected in separate bodies. Monolith Soft executive producer Tetsuya Takahashi stated that Pyra and Mythra were originally not supposed to return, with the game ending on an ambiguous note with Rex's Core Crystal glowing. Instead, the two were brought back to give the game a more conclusive ending. Pyra and Mythra appear in a photograph near the end of Xenoblade Chronicles 3, where they are shown to have both had a child with Rex: Pyra's daughter Glimmer appears in the Future Redeemed expansion, while Mythra's daughter Shimmer appears in the game's Nintendo Switch 2 Edition.

In March 2021, Pyra and Mythra were added to Super Smash Bros. Ultimate as playable fighters via downloadable content, following continued fan demand for additional representatives of the Xenoblade Chronicles series. Their inclusion drew some attention, as Rex was expected to be chosen instead. Because Xenoblade Chronicles 2 had a higher age rating in Japan, partly due to the characters' sexualized nature, adjustments were made for their appearance in Ultimate, which targets a larger audience. In the original game, their designs emphasize exposed skin and stylized proportions. For Ultimate, Pyra was given black leggings that reduced how much of her thighs are visible, while Mythra's design was altered more significantly, including additional covering around the chest and legs. Game director Masahiro Sakurai said these changes were necessary to align with the game's all-ages rating. Gameplay-wise, Pyra's moveset emphasizes powerful fire-based attacks, while Mythra's focuses on quick light-based abilities.

== Development ==
Character designer Masatsugu Saito described Pyra as a "protective presence" for Rex, with her design drawing on the image of a flame with a burning core. Her design also mirrors a sense of incompleteness, suggesting her connection to Mythra. This is conveyed through intentional asymmetrical details, including uneven glowing elements and parts of her outfit, particularly the back, left partially uncovered. Throughout the games, Pyra and Mythra are voiced in English by Skye Bennett and in Japanese by Shino Shimoji.

In Japan, Pyra is named Homura (meaning "flame" or "blaze"), and Mythra is named Hikari (meaning "light"), with their respective red and white color schemes reflecting these meanings. For the English localization of Xenoblade Chronicles 2, their names were adapted to retain these associations: Homura was rendered as Pyra, derived from "pyre" to evoke fire, while Hikari was rendered as Mythra, referencing Mithra, a light-associated figure in ancient Indo-Iranian mythology.

Sakurai explained that, early on in the development of Super Smash Bros. Ultimate, Rex and Pyra were considered for inclusion as playable characters, with the idea of both appearing simultaneously on screen, but this approach was quickly deemed difficult due to technical and processing limitations. He said that, unlike the Ice Climbers, playable characters who shared identical models and actions, Rex and Pyra would have required distinct behaviors and data, exceeding system constraints. An alternative concept, in which Rex functioned as the primary fighter while Pyra assisted him, was also considered too complex to implement effectively. As a result, the development team instead pursued a design centered on switching between Pyra and Mythra, allowing both characters from Xenoblade Chronicles 2 to be represented within technical constraints.

== Promotion and reception ==
Good Smile Company has produced multiple 1/7 scale figures of Pyra and Mythra, with the first figure released being of Pyra in December 2018 and then Mythra's in March 2019. The company made figures again for both characters in 2022. Later in 2023, amiibo figures based on the characters' design in Super Smash Bros. Ultimate were released, featuring compatibility with Xenoblade Chronicles 3. The figures were reprinted in 2025, synchronizing with the release of Xenoblade Chronicles X: Definitive Edition.

Following the announcement of Pyra and Mythra's inclusion in Super Smash Bros. Ultimate, fans of deceased streamer Etika noted that he had previously expressed fondness for the characters, referring to them as his "waifus". The announcement prompted increased discussion on Twitter, where his name trended as users referenced his past reactions to his favourite characters and speculated on how he might have responded to the reveal. Additionally, according to Kate Gray of Nintendo Life, the reveal of Pyra and Mythra in Super Smash Bros. Ultimate also caused a significant increase in Xenoblade Chronicles 2 sales, with copies of the game selling out quickly across American and Japanese Amazon stores.

=== Analysis in Xenoblade Chronicles 2 ===
Nadia Oxford of USgamer discussed Pyra's depiction from Xenoblade Chronicles 2 as an example of the disconnect between character writing and visual design in Japanese role-playing games. Oxford criticized Pyra's revealing outfit, calling it a "dumb costume" having features such as skin-tight top and "booty shorts", as representative of persistent fan service trends that can overshadow characterization and create awkwardness for players trying to defend the medium. At the same time, she emphasized that Pyra herself is written with a calm demeanor, emotional maturity, and a grounded presence, making her a character she found easy to appreciate despite her design. Conversely, she said that backlash to Pyra's design led some audiences to dismiss the game outright, a reaction she viewed as disproportionate and dismissive of Pyra's narrative qualities. Similarly, The A.V. Club's Garrett Martin criticized Pyra's character for prioritizing visual appeal over characterization, describing the approach as an instance of fan service aimed at attracting a presumed young male audience, reducing her to just an aesthetic element.

In an article for Rice Digital, Conor Evans wrote that Pyra and Mythra are a major part of what makes Xenoblade Chronicles 2 engaging, reasoning their strength as characters and their importance to the story. He focused on how their relationship with Rex develops over time, describing it as one of the more memorable aspects of the narrative. Evans noted Pyra's caring and affectionate personality, while describing Mythra as more guarded at first but gradually showing a softer side. He also praised their designs and how they differ yet complement each other, viewing their bond as similar to that of sisters. Overall, he saw the story as a straightforward "boy meets girl" narrative, but one shaped by the fact that Pyra and Mythra hold immense power, which influences both their character arcs and the emotional tone of the plot.

=== Analysis in Super Smash Bros. Ultimate ===
Ethan Gach of Kotaku said that he was initially skeptical toward the inclusion of Pyra and Mythra in Super Smash Bros. Ultimate, showing lack of interest as the game already features a large number of sword-wielding fighters. Following hands-on experience, however, he classified the duo as among his preferred additions, praising their unique playstyles: Pyra's slow, high-damage attacks and Mythra's faster, combo-oriented moves, as well as the fluidity of their transformation mechanic, which he compared to earlier characters such as Princess Zelda and Sheik. Gach also noticed similarities to switching between heavier and faster sword fighters like Ike and Marth, while spotlighting the pair's distinctive animations, visually elaborate attacks, and overall accessibility. He considered their moveset both satisfying and versatile, with certain abilities encouraging repeated use despite tactical drawbacks. While observing that their inclusion increased representation from Xenoblade Chronicles 2 within the roster, he concluded that they justified their addition through their design and gameplay.

Ayuo Kawase from Automaton Japan discussed the ambiguity surrounding character design standards in Super Smash Bros. Ultimate by utilizing the adjustments that were made to Pyra and Mythra from their original designs as a point of comparison. He questioned where the line is crossed in terms of acceptable character exposure, noting that while Pyra and Mythra were altered to reduce visible skin on their thighs in certain contexts, other fighters in the game still appear in outfits that expose their legs. Kawase suggested this indicates there is no consistent restriction on leg exposure. He further argued that visible cleavage appears to be largely absent among the roster, aside from brief or incidental cases, implying a stricter guideline in that area. At the same time, he observed that jiggle physics was added to Pyra and Mythra themselves, challenging the idea of a blanket prohibition on such animation.

In coverage by Olivia Richman of Inven Global, the reveal of Pyra and Mythra in Super Smash Bros. Ultimate was met with backlash over their inclusion as sword fighters, but she argued that much of the community response instead fixated on their bodies, especially their breasts. She noted widespread discussion about perceived censorship of Mythra's design compared to Xenoblade Chronicles 2, and placed this within a broader pattern of sexualization in the Super Smash Bros. community, referencing similar behavior toward characters such as Zero Suit Samus, Inkling, Isabelle, and Princess Peach, including sexualized fan art, voyeuristic gameplay clips, and discussions focused on specific body parts. Drawing on responses from women in gaming spaces, Richman reported that such behavior was often viewed as reinforcing the male gaze and contributing to discomfort or exclusion, even when framed as jokes. She also discussed a related controversy involving Juan DeBiedma (known professionally as "Hungrybox"), whose apology for a "tone-deaf" joke about Pyra and Mythra's breasts led to backlash from parts of the community, which she interpreted as resistance to acknowledging the impact of objectification. Richman concluded that these reactions reflect a broader issue within gaming culture, where the normalization of sexualized commentary about female characters can shape how women are treated and how welcome they feel in these spaces.
