= Xenoblade Chronicles 2: Torna – The Golden Country =

2018 video game

Xenoblade Chronicles 2: Torna ~ The Golden Country
- Icon artwork used internationally, featuring the protagonists Jin (left) and Lora (right) looking at Auresco
- Developer: Monolith Soft
- Publisher: Nintendo
- Directors: Koh Kojima; Genki Yokota
- Producers: Koh Kojima; Hitoshi Yamagami
- Programmer: Toshiaki Yajima
- Artists: Eiji Takahashi; Masatsugu Saito; Tetsuya Nomura
- Writers: Tetsuya Takahashi; Yuichiro Takeda; Mamoru Ohta
- Composers: Yasunori Mitsuda; ACE (Note: Music group consisting of Tomori Kudo and Hiroyo "CHiCO" Yamanaka); Kenji Hiramatsu; Manami Kiyota
- Series: Xenoblade
- Platforms: Nintendo Switch; Nintendo Switch 2
- Release: WW: September 14, 2018; Nintendo Switch 2: WW: July 30, 2026
- Genre: Action role-playing
- Mode: Single-player

Xenoblade Chronicles 2: Torna – The Golden Country (Note: Known in Japan as Xenoblade 2: Ōgon no Kuni Īra (Japanese: ゼノブレイド２ 黄金の国イーラ, Hepburn: Zenobureido Tsū Ōgon no Kuni Īra; lit. 'Xenoblade 2: Ira – The Golden Country')) is a 2018 action role-playing game developed by Monolith Soft and published by Nintendo for the Nintendo Switch console. It is a story expansion to the 2017 game, Xenoblade Chronicles 2, and was released both as downloadable content and as a standalone title on a physical cartridge.

== Gameplay ==
Torna – The Golden Country expands on Xenoblade Chronicles 2 by introducing a new combat system. The battle system and other gameplay systems were changed from the base game because Tetsuya Takahashi had a strong desire to make it easy for players to engage with the game. Since the game was designed as a separate DLC experience, the team incorporated as many new gameplay elements as possible to go along with its story and characters.

In comparison to the base game, Torna – The Golden Country made improvements to the user interface and tutorials. One such example is the ability to switch characters and entire teams with a single button when out in the field. The collectible items in the field are now sorted into categories to make them easier to collect. Monolith Soft also added a "Tips" section to the game, allowing players to review previous tutorials. Regarding the battle system, there are three members in a team, and a maximum of three teams, making the total amount of playable characters at nine. When in battle, only one team can be in direct control while the other teams are controlled by the CPU. The battle composition for the active team includes the Vanguard and the Rear Guard. The character in the frontline and rear line is represented by the Vanguard and Rear Guard respectively. Unlike in the main game, the Rear Guard is an active participator in the battle. The way that Blade combos and chain attacks work have also been revamped.

The team streamlined the sidequests, implementing a new "Community" system. "Community" is a more straightforward version of the "Affinity Chart" in Xenoblade Chronicles and Xenoblade Chronicles X. Compared to the base game, there is more of an emphasis on how the sidequest characters relate to the main characters. Monolith Soft integrated a new system called "Camping", which is an amalgamation of the main game's crafting, Inn, and Heart-to-Hearts.

== Synopsis ==
=== Setting and characters ===
Xenoblade Chronicles 2: Torna – The Golden Country features a brand-new story and environments, taking place 494 years before the events of Xenoblade Chronicles 2. It explores the pasts of several main characters from the base game, such as Jin, Mythra, Malos, and Praetor Amalthus, and introduces characters such as Lora and Addam as playable party members.

=== Plot ===
494 years prior to the events of Xenoblade Chronicles 2, the Aegis Malos has been awakened by the misanthropic Quaestor Amalthus of Indol and embarked on a campaign of destruction. The mercenary Lora and her trusted partner Jin are recruited by Addam Origo, fourth prince of Torna and Driver of Malos' counterpart Mythra, to battle Malos. Together with Addam's young attendant Milton, the group detours to Gormott to track down Lora's mother, who has been killed in a bandit attack. In Gormott, the group is joined by Emperor Hugo Ardanach of Mor Ardain and attacked by Gort, Lora's abusive stepfather who stole Jin's Core Crystal from the Tornan royal family and tried to kill her when she bonded to it 17 years prior. Lora defeats Gort, who unbeknownst to her is captured by Amalthus' men. The party returns to Torna, and learn that Malos is targeting the Tornan capital Auresco.

When they arrive in Auresco, Malos besieges the city and declares his intention to destroy the Tornan titan by overloading it with ether energy. The party pursues Malos to the Titan's core and battles him, but Malos launches an attack on Auresco that kills Milton. A distraught and enraged Mythra unleashes her full power to drive off Malos, but loses control and accidentally kills Hugo and destroys Torna. Devastated over the destruction that she caused, Mythra retreats into a split personality named Pyra. Addam departs for Leftheria to seal Pyra away, while Jin takes Lora and the others to a militia camp in Spessia to meet up with Tornan survivors. In Spessia, Lora is again attacked by Gort, whom Amalthus has transformed into a monstrous Blade Eater, and is forced to kill him in self-defense. Amalthus launches a coup to take control of Indol, becoming the nation's Praetor. Some time later, after Lora has been killed in an attack on the Tornan survivors by Amalthus and Jin has consumed her heart to become a Flesh Eater, Jin burns the remnants of his old life and embarks on a quest for revenge against Amalthus. In a post-credits scene, Rex discovers the room where Pyra was sealed by Addam, leading into the events of the main game.

== Development ==
In 2015, Torna – The Golden Country was one of the potential story candidates in the initial prototype for Xenoblade Chronicles 2. According to series creator Tetsuya Takahashi, Monolith Soft quickly decided against showing the prototype to Nintendo because they knew it would significantly inflate the budget and development time of the main game. As a result, they shelved the concept and stored it on Takahashi's computer hard drive. Later on, they went back and revived the scenario as a story expansion pass. Additionally, the story was originally planned to be in between chapters seven and eight of the base game's story, but they opted to keep them separate so that they could expand the scope of the story. The game boasts a new rendering engine which is slightly graphically enhanced compared to the base game. Takahashi specifically pointed out the difference between the fields of Gormott between both games.

According to Takahashi, they received a ton of feedback from new players regarding the gameplay systems in general. He noted that a lot of new players found the base game's battle system to be a bit intimidating. As a result, Monolith Soft designed this entry to be easier to pick up for the first time. There are more tutorials in the early stages to explain some of the more complex aspects of battle and character development, and the map had been streamlined so they are easier to understand. For Takahashi, who is used to working on games lasting at 80 hours at minimum, he said that the biggest challenge the development team faced was balancing the actual game work and flow in a way that felt right into a 20-hour-long RPG.

Xenoblade Chronicles 2: Torna – The Golden Country was released digitally as a part of the game's expansion pass on September 14, 2018, and physically at retail on September 21.

=== Music ===
Yasunori Mitsuda and the other music composers returned to write music, a total of eleven new tracks, for the DLC. According to Takahashi, the arrangers deliberately used acoustic instruments to match the more somber and mature tones of the story. Jen Bird also returned to perform the ending theme, titled "A Moment of Eternity". A digital soundtrack was released on December 14, 2018.

=== Release ===
The game was released on September 14, 2018. It was available digitally as part of the Xenoblade Chronicles 2 DLC season pass and can be accessed through the in-game menu after purchasing and downloading the expansion. One week later, on September 21, 2018, it was also released as a standalone physical Nintendo Switch game cartridge. The physical edition also included a code for the original game's DLC season pass, which included "Helpful Items Pack", "New Quest Pack", "New Rare Blade Pack", and "New Challenge Mode Pack".

Nintendo Switch 2 enhancements for Torna – The Golden Country were released on July 30, 2026. For players who originally purchased the expansion as part of Xenoblade Chronicles 2's season pass, the expansion's upgrade is included with the paid Nintendo Switch 2 Edition upgrade pack for the base game. Those who purchased the standalone version of the expansion instead received the enhancements via a free update for the Nintendo Switch version released the same day.

== Reception ==
Reception

Aggregate scores
Aggregator	Score
Metacritic	80/100
OpenCritic	85% recommend

Review scores
Publication	Score
Destructoid	8/10
Famitsu	35/40
Game Informer	7/10
Nintendo Life	9/10
Nintendo World Report	8.5/10
Pocket Gamer	4/5

Upon its announcement, Xenoblade Chronicles 2: Torna – The Golden Country was positively received, with some critics expressing enthusiasm for the story expansion. Others cited endearing, relatable characters, interesting story, and an improved battle system. The game holds an 80/100 rating on Metacritic, a video game review aggregator, indicating "generally favorable reviews".

The game was nominated for the G.A.N.G. / MAGFEST People's Choice Award at the 2019 G.A.N.G. Awards.

As of November 2020, combined sales of the original game and Torna – The Golden Country had exceeded 2.05 million. Monolith Software's executive director Tetsuya Takahashi stated that "It's still early days for the Torna DLC, but from what we've seen in Japan, the sales of the Torna DLC are exceeding our expectations as well."
