= Xenoblade Genesis =

- Developer: Monolith Soft
- Publisher: Nintendo
- Artists: Mai Yoneyama; PALOW.
- Composers: Yasunori Mitsuda; Manami Kiyota; Mariam Abounnasr
- Series: Xenoblade
- Platform: Nintendo Switch 2
- Release: 2027
- Genre: Action role-playing
- Mode: Single-player

Xenoblade Genesis (Note: Japanese: ゼノブレイド ジェネシス, Hepburn: Zenobureido Jeneshisu) is an upcoming action role-playing game developed by Monolith Soft and published by Nintendo for the Nintendo Switch 2, slated for release in 2027. It is the fifth installment in the Xenoblade series, and introduces a new storyline following the conclusion of the Chronicles trilogy.

== Plot ==
=== Setting and characters ===
The story takes place in the world of Anshar. The main character Eleanor goes on a journey to become a Vesselai, warriors who wield the power of Anima which flows through the land. A portion of the story begins at an academy named Leukos, which is where Eleanor learns to use a Crystone to amplify her power over Anima.

== Development ==
After the conclusion of the Xenoblade Chronicles saga, series director and producer Genki Yokota reaffirmed that the series would go on. Executive director Tetsuya Takahashi teased that those who played Xenoblade Chronicles 3 and its Future Redeemed expansion will be able to imagine the future of Xenoblade. Xenoblade Genesis was initially revealed in the June 2026 Nintendo Direct.

The character designs are handled by Mai Yoneyama and PALOW.

=== Music ===
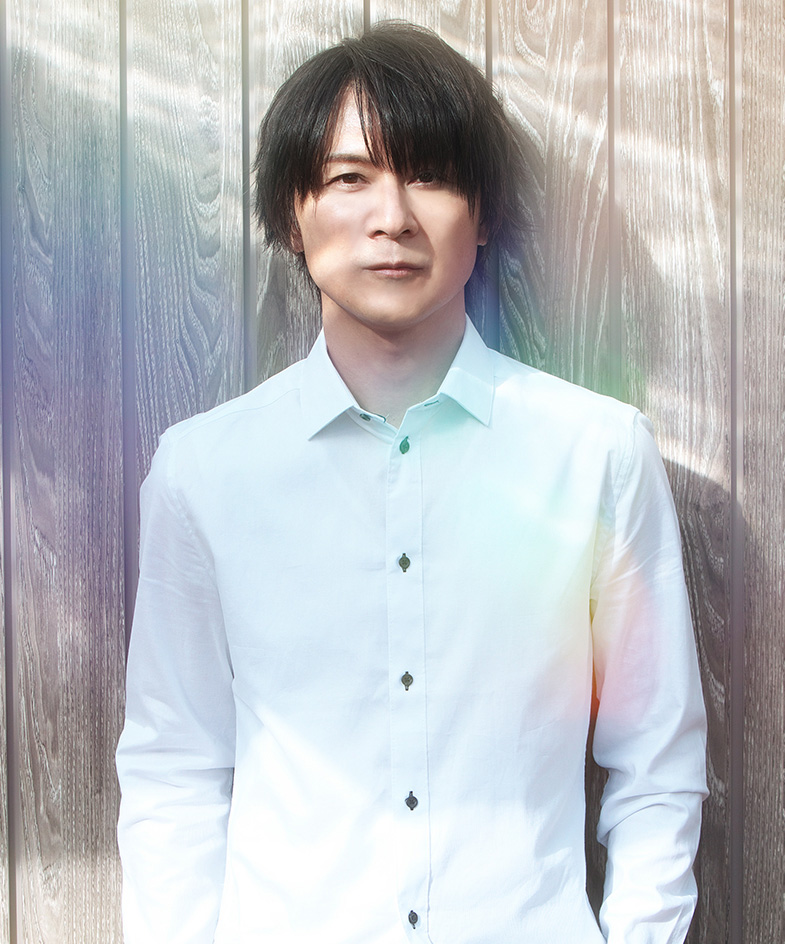
Composition of the game's soundtrack was led by Yasunori Mitsuda.

The soundtrack is composed by Yasunori Mitsuda, Manami Kiyota, and Mariam Abounnasr, all of whom composed for previous series entries. The Irish choral ensemble Anúna also return for the game's soundtrack.
