= Xenoblade =

Video game franchise

- Official series logo
- Genre: Action role-playing
- Developer: Monolith Soft
- Publisher: Nintendo
- Creators: Tetsuya Takahashi; Koh Kojima
- Producers: Shingo Kawabata; Takao Nakano; Koh Kojima; Hitoshi Yamagami; Toyokazu Nonaka; Genki Yokota
- Artists: Norihiro Takami; Kunihiko Tanaka; Masatsugu Saito; Eiji Takahashi
- Writers: Tetsuya Takahashi; Yuichiro Takeda; Kazuho Hyodo; Yurie Hattori; Mamoru Ohta
- Composers: ACE (Note: Music group consisting of Tomori Kudo and Hiroyo "CHiCO" Yamanaka); Manami Kiyota; Kenji Hiramatsu; Yasunori Mitsuda; Mariam Abounnasr; Yoko Shimomura; Hiroyuki Sawano
- Platforms: Wii; New Nintendo 3DS; Wii U; Nintendo Switch; Nintendo Switch 2
- First release: Xenoblade Chronicles; June 10, 2010
- Latest release: Xenoblade Chronicles 2 – Nintendo Switch 2 Edition; July 30, 2026
- Parent series: Xeno

Xenoblade (Note: Japanese: ゼノブレイド, Hepburn: Zenobureido) is a series of action role-playing games developed by Monolith Soft and published by Nintendo. It is a part of the Xeno metaseries, from which it receives its namesake; the series is also co-created and directed by Tetsuya Takahashi.

The series began with Xenoblade Chronicles, published for the Wii in 2010 in Japan, and released in Europe and Oceania the following year. Nintendo originally had no plans for a North American release, but after a fan campaign named Operation Rainfall showed sufficient interest, the game was eventually released in the region in 2012 to critical success. It was followed by Xenoblade Chronicles X (2015) for the Wii U, and Xenoblade Chronicles 2 (2017) and Xenoblade Chronicles 3 (2022) for the Nintendo Switch. A fifth game, Xenoblade Genesis, is set to be released in 2027. Certain entries have received DLC story expansions, and remastered editions have also been released on newer platforms.

Xenoblade has been well-received for its world design, music, stories, and themes. It has been commercially successful, selling more than 8.74 million copies worldwide. The series has been represented in other gaming franchises, including the Super Smash Bros. and Project X Zone series.

== Gameplay ==
Gameplay in the Xenoblade series uses a real-time action-based battle system, where the player manually moves a character in real-time, and party members "auto-attack" when enemies enter their attack radius. Manually input attacks, called "Arts", may also be performed, but in a limited fashion. Battle Arts are only available after a "cool down" period that occurs after every use, while character specific "Talent Arts" only become available after enough auto-attacks are executed. Both party members and enemies have a finite number of health points, and attacks deplete this value. Combat is won when all enemies lose their HP, but the game is lost if the player's character loses all their HP and has no means of being revived. Health may be restored by the player by using healing Arts in battle, or the player may let characters' HP regenerate automatically outside of battle. Winning battles earns the player experience points, which allows the characters to grow stronger by leveling up and learning new Arts. Arts for each character must be set by the player on their respective set up, called a "Battle Palette", outside of battles.

Another defining aspect of the Xenoblade games is exploration. In each game, players are encouraged to freely explore the open world environments. Players can discover locations and landmarks, which in turn grants them experience points. Once landmarks are discovered, players can use them as fast travel points.

=== Audio ===
The Xenoblade series has been praised and highly regarded for the wide variety of music across all of the games' soundtracks. The main composers are Yoko Shimomura, Hiroyuki Sawano, and Yasunori Mitsuda. Other composers who have contributed to the soundtracks include Manami Kiyota, ACE (a musical duo consisting of Tomori Kudo and Hiroyo "CHiCO" Yamanaka), Kenji Hiramatsu, and Mariam Abounnasr.

== Plot ==
=== Story ===
Although the stories are largely self-contained in each game in the Xenoblade series, the Chronicles games are linked through the origins of their fictional universes. Dismayed by the state of the Earth, the scientist Klaus desired to reboot the world and create a new universe. His coworker Galea attempted to reason with him to prevent the world from collapsing. Ultimately, she failed to change his mind as he initiated the experiment to harness the Conduit, an alien artifact that acted as an unlimited energy source and dimensional gateway. This process resulted in the formation of the worlds of Xenoblade Chronicles and Xenoblade Chronicles 2.

Some time after the events of Xenoblade Chronicles and Xenoblade Chronicles 2, the two worlds were on a collision course known as the Intersection. Fearing the total oblivion of their respective universes, the people of both worlds communicated and each began the construction of one half of Origin, a structure containing the memories and souls of both worlds, designed to rebirth the collective people and safely reboot the worlds. Origin's A.I. was corrupted by the fearful desires for security and stability of the digitized souls it contained, however, which led to the events of Xenoblade Chronicles 3.

In the series's fictional chronology, Xenoblade Chronicles is the first game to take place. Its epilogue, Xenoblade Chronicles: Future Connected is set one year after the events of the main game. Xenoblade Chronicles 2 takes place in a parallel universe, occurring simultaneously to the events of Xenoblade Chronicles. Its prequel, Xenoblade Chronicles 2: Torna – The Golden Country is set 500 years before the events of the game. Xenoblade Chronicles 3 takes place an unspecified amount of time after the previous games, and depicts the future of the worlds of Xenoblade Chronicles and Xenoblade Chronicles 2. Its downloadable story, Future Redeemed, is a prequel that serves to bridge the stories of Xenoblade Chronicles 3 and the previous games, set centuries before Xenoblade Chronicles 3. According to Tetsuya Takahashi, Xenoblade Chronicles 3 is the conclusion of the story that began with Klaus's experiment but not the end of the series.

The events of Xenoblade Chronicles X take place in a separate universe removed from those of the Chronicles trilogy; however, it is indirectly linked to the others through the existence of the Conduit, which acts as a gateway between the various universes in Xenoblade's multiverse.

=== Setting ===
While the Xenoblade games do not share any setting directly, its universes are directly linked. Two colossal titans known as the Bionis and the Mechonis serve as the setting for Xenoblade Chronicles; with the Future Connected epilogue taking place in a smaller area, the Bionis's shoulder. Xenoblade Chronicles 2 and its prequel Torna – The Golden Country take place in the world of Alrest, which contains several titans that house many different nations. Xenoblade Chronicles 3 takes place in the world of Aionios, a large continent made up of areas from Bionis and Alrest.

The lone exception is Xenoblade Chronicles X, which is regarded as a spiritual successor to the first game and does not directly connect to the Chronicles trilogy. It takes place on Mira, an alien planet colonized by humanity.

=== Characters ===
To make each individual title in the series accessible for newcomers, a new cast of characters is introduced each time. Contrary to the developers' claim of making the games standalone experiences, a few characters have returned as part of the overarching narrative. Shulk and Rex, the main protagonists of Xenoblade Chronicles and Xenoblade Chronicles 2 respectively, reappear for the Xenoblade Chronicles 3 DLC campaign, Future Redeemed. Similarly, Melia Antiqua and Nia return as the Queens of Keves and Agnus in Xenoblade Chronicles 3.

There are a few recurring character themes, with no narrative ties to previous games in the series. Much like Cid in the Final Fantasy series, Vandham is a recurring character name who has been in every Xenoblade game, even tracing back to its roots in earlier Xeno games. Jack Vandham, Vandham, and Guernica Vandham appeared in Xenoblade Chronicles X, Xenoblade Chronicles 2, and Xenoblade Chronicles 3 respectively. Vandham also has a version in Xenoblade Chronicles that was renamed to Colonel Vangarre in the English localization.

The Nopon are a recurring type of creature found in every entry in the series. They are a race of small winged hamster-like creatures. Despite their cute appearance, many Nopon have cunning or greedy behavior. Each game typically has a Nopon character who is either a playable party member or a travel companion. Another recurring character theme is a creature resembling a gorilla, typically named Territorial Rotbart at or around level 81. Territorial Rotbart or any other variation of a level 81 Unique Monster, is typically found in an early starting zone who terrorizes players once encountered.

== Development ==
Release timeline
2010	Xenoblade Chronicles
2011–2014
2015	Xenoblade Chronicles 3D
2015	Xenoblade Chronicles X
2016
2017	Xenoblade Chronicles 2
2018	Xenoblade Chronicles 2: Torna – The Golden Country
2019
2020	Xenoblade Chronicles: Definitive Edition
2021
2022	Xenoblade Chronicles 3
2023–2024
2025	Xenoblade Chronicles X: Definitive Edition
2026	Xenoblade Chronicles X: Definitive Edition – Nintendo Switch 2 Edition
2026	Xenoblade Chronicles: Definitive Edition – Nintendo Switch 2 Edition
2026	Xenoblade Chronicles 2 – Nintendo Switch 2 Edition
2026	Xenoblade Chronicles 3 – Nintendo Switch 2 Edition
2027	Xenoblade Genesis

=== 2006–2015: Xenoblade Chronicles and X ===
The staff at Monolith Soft was left in a state of low morale after the commercial failure of the Xenosaga series, which ultimately led to its premature end. In July 2006, Tetsuya Takahashi was struck by the idea of people living on top of enormous titans, so he wrote the concept down and turned it into a 3D model. Following this, Monolith Soft began development of what would become Xenoblade Chronicles, an action role-playing game for the Wii. The project was initially called Monado: Beginning of the World, but was changed to Xenoblade in Japan to honor Takahashi's previous work on the Xeno series and for his hard work on the game. The game's story follows Shulk and his friends as they embark on a quest for revenge against the Mechon for the assault on their home. As they journey along the backs of the titans, they unravel the secrets of a powerful weapon known as the Monado.

Xenoblade Chronicles was released in Japan on June 10, 2010. Nintendo of Europe announced that they were publishing the game, adding Chronicles to Xenoblade. The game was released in Europe and Australia on August 19, 2011, and September 1, 2011, respectively. Originally, Nintendo had no plans to release the title in North America. In response, fans launched a campaign known as Operation Rainfall to convince Nintendo to bring Xenoblade Chronicles to North America along with The Last Story and Pandora's Tower. After months of silence, Nintendo of America confirmed that the title was headed for North America in April 2012. It was released in North America as a GameStop exclusive on April 6, 2012. It was later ported to the New Nintendo 3DS by Monster Games as Xenoblade Chronicles 3D in 2015, and was remastered as Xenoblade Chronicles: Definitive Edition on the Nintendo Switch in 2020.

Following the completion of Xenoblade Chronicles, Takahashi's team began development of a new game for Nintendo's then in-development Wii U system. Originally announced under the working title X in 2013, the game was renamed to Xenoblade Chronicles X and released in 2015. Set in a separate universe from the rest of the Xenoblade Chronicles series, an interstellar war forces humanity to flee a destroyed Earth. After crashing on the uncharted planet Mira, Elma and her team race against time to retrieve the Lifehold, a structure that contains thousands of lives. It was released on the Wii U in 2015.

=== 2016–2018: Xenoblade Chronicles 2 ===
Development on a new Xenoblade Chronicles game began in 2014, during the latter half of development of Xenoblade Chronicles X. The game was released in 2017 for the Nintendo Switch. Taking place in a world of dying titans, Rex meets the living weapon Pyra and promises to bring her to the fabled paradise Elysium.

Xenoblade Chronicles 2: Torna – The Golden Country is set 500 years before the events of Xenoblade Chronicles 2. In the game's story Lora and Jin fight against Malos and his army before the inevitable fall of their kingdom, Torna. It was released in 2018 on the Nintendo Switch as both a standalone game and as an expansion for Xenoblade Chronicles 2.

=== 2019–2025: Nintendo Switch remasters and Xenoblade Chronicles 3 ===
Xenoblade Chronicles: Future Connected is set one year after the events of the main story in the original Xenoblade Chronicles. Taking place on the Bionis' Shoulder, an area not explored in the original game, Future Connected follows Melia, Shulk, and Riki's daughter Nene and adopted son Kino as they seek to reclaim the city of Alcamoth. It was released in 2020 on the Nintendo Switch as part of the remaster Xenoblade Chronicles: Definitive Edition.

Xenoblade Chronicles 3 takes place in the world of Aionios, with two warring nations: Keves and Agnus. It features a narrative depicting the respective futures for the worlds of Xenoblade Chronicles and Xenoblade Chronicles 2. Main protagonists Noah from Keves and Mio from Agnus must put aside their differences in order to face a larger threat. It was released in 2022 on the Nintendo Switch.

Xenoblade Chronicles 3: Future Redeemed is a major story expansion for Xenoblade Chronicles 3, released in 2023. Its story takes place centuries before Xenoblade Chronicles 3 and serves to bridge the stories of 3 and the previous games in the series. Monolith Soft compared the size of Future Redeemed to Xenoblade Chronicles 2: Torna – The Golden Country.

Xenoblade Chronicles X: Definitive Edition is a remaster of the original Xenoblade Chronicles X, released for the Nintendo Switch in 2025. It adds multiple quality of life changes and a new story epilogue.

=== 2026–present: Nintendo Switch 2 editions and Xenoblade Genesis ===
In a 2022 interview, series director and producer Genki Yokota ensured that the series will go on and that they would like to keep it going for as long as possible. Xenoblade Chronicles 3 is the conclusion to the story arc of Xenoblade Chronicles and Xenoblade Chronicles 2. Nonetheless, Tetsuya Takahashi indicated that it is not the end of the series. He suggested that those who play the game and Future Redeemed can imagine what lies ahead for the series. Series director Koh Kojima expressed an interest in making Xenoblade Chronicles X2.

Upgraded Nintendo Switch 2 ports of all four Xenoblade Chronicles games were released over the course of 2026. During a Nintendo Direct presentation in June 2026, Nintendo announced a fifth Xenoblade game, Xenoblade Genesis, scheduled for release in 2027.

== Reception ==
Sales and aggregate review scores As of July 29, 2025.
Game	Year	Units sold	Metacritic
Xenoblade Chronicles	2010	-	92/100
Xenoblade Chronicles 3D	2015	-	86/100
Xenoblade Chronicles X	2015	-	84/100
Xenoblade Chronicles 2	2017	2.70 million	83/100
Xenoblade Chronicles 2: Torna – The Golden Country	2018	-	80/100
Xenoblade Chronicles: Definitive Edition	2020	1.88 million	89/100
Xenoblade Chronicles 3	2022	1.86 million	89/100
Xenoblade Chronicles 3: Future Redeemed	2023	-	92/100
Xenoblade Chronicles X: Definitive Edition	2025	-	87/100

Xenoblade Chronicles sold nearly 200,000 units in Japan by the end of 2013. In a later interview, it was revealed that the game sold better in the west than in Japan. As of December 2015, Xenoblade Chronicles X sold roughly 377,000 units between Japan, France, and the United States. Xenoblade Chronicles 2 sold 1.42 million copies as of June 2018, which became the best-selling title ever developed by Monolith Soft. Its sales performance exceeded the company's expectations in western territories. Xenoblade Chronicles 2: Torna – The Golden Country was also noted for surpassing their sales expectations in Japan as well. As of December 2022, Xenoblade Chronicles 3 has sold 1.86 million units

== Legacy ==
=== In other games ===
The Xenoblade series has been represented in different mediums. Shulk appears as a playable fighter in Super Smash Bros. for Nintendo 3DS and Wii U and Super Smash Bros. Ultimate. Pyra and Mythra also appear as a dual character as downloadable content for Super Smash Bros. Ultimate. In addition to Shulk, Dunban from the original Xenoblade Chronicles as well as Rex and Nia from Xenoblade Chronicles 2 appear as Mii Fighter costumes in Ultimate. Fiora from the original Xenoblade Chronicles appears as a playable character in Project X Zone 2. The Legend of Zelda: Breath of the Wild features the outfit worn by Rex in Xenoblade Chronicles 2.

A Shulk amiibo figure was released in February 2015, which functions as an NPC opponent in Super Smash Bros. and unlocks costumes based on Shulk in Yoshi's Woolly World and Super Mario Maker. Amiibo figures of Pyra and Mythra were released on July 21, 2023, and function similarly to Shulk's amiibo in Super Smash Bros. Ultimate as an NPC opponent. Amiibo figures of Noah and Mio from Xenoblade Chronicles 3 were released on 19 January 2024. Good Smile Company has released several figures based on characters from the series, including Pyra, Mythra, KOS-MOS, Melia, and Nia.
