= Xenoblade Chronicles 3 =

- Icon artwork, featuring the game's protagonists (from left to right: Sena, Lanz, Mio, Noah, Taion and Eunie)
- Developer: Monolith Soft (Note: Additional work, development support, and produced by Nintendo Entertainment Planning & Development)
- Publisher: Nintendo
- Directors: Koh Kojima; Genki Yokota
- Producers: Koh Kojima; Genki Yokota; Katsuya Eguchi; Toyokazu Nonaka; Tomohiro Hagiwara
- Programmer: Toshiaki Yajima
- Artists: Eiji Takahashi; Masatsugu Saito; Koichi Mugitani
- Writers: Tetsuya Takahashi; Yuichiro Takeda; Kazuho Hyodo
- Composers: Yasunori Mitsuda; ACE (Note: Music group consisting of Tomori Kudo and Hiroyo "CHiCO" Yamanaka); Kenji Hiramatsu; Manami Kiyota; Mariam Abounnasr; Yutaka Kunigo
- Series: Xenoblade
- Platforms: Nintendo Switch; Nintendo Switch 2
- Release: Nintendo Switch: WW: July 29, 2022; Nintendo Switch 2: WW: December 3, 2026
- Genre: Action role-playing
- Mode: Single-player

Xenoblade Chronicles 3 (Note: Known in Japan as Xenoblade 3 (Japanese: ゼノブレイド3, Hepburn: Zenobureido Surī)) is a 2022 action role-playing game developed by Monolith Soft and published by Nintendo for the Nintendo Switch. It is an installment in the open-world Xenoblade series, itself a part of the larger Xeno franchise. Xenoblade Chronicles 3 depicts the futures of the worlds featured in Xenoblade Chronicles (2010) and Xenoblade Chronicles 2 (2017) and concludes the trilogy's narrative.

The development team wanted to develop a story-driven game in the style of the first two entries in the series, while featuring content and combat from previous Xeno entries. The gameplay and world combines elements from the first and second entries. Like the first two entries, the game was localized by Nintendo of Europe, utilizing a cast of primarily British voice actors.

Xenoblade Chronicles 3 takes place in Aionios, where two warring nations, Keves and Agnus, engage in perpetual war fought by soldiers with ten-year lifespans. The story follows Noah and his two childhood friends, Eunie and Lanz, who are from Keves, and Mio and her two fellow servicemen, Taion and Sena, who are from Agnus. The six gain the power to fuse together in pairs, known as Ouroboros, and decide to cooperate to uncover the mystery behind the perpetual war and the true nature of their world.

Xenoblade Chronicles 3 was received positively by critics, who praised its story, themes, gameplay, music, characters, and scale, but criticized its technical and graphical issues at launch. The game had sold 1.86 million copies by March 2023. A downloadable content expansion taking place before the events of the game, Future Redeemed, was released in April 2023. An updated port for Nintendo Switch 2 is scheduled for a December 3, 2026 release.

== Gameplay ==
Xenoblade Chronicles 3 is an action role-playing game with a large open world. Unlike previous Xenoblade games, the game allows for up to seven party members to participate in battles at once, including the main party of six controllable characters plus an additional character known as a "Hero". Up to 19 Heroes are available in the base game, each with different skills and abilities, and can be recruited to the party through story events or sidequests. In addition, four heroes were added in the DLC. Party members also have the ability to change their character class, granting them access to different abilities; raising a Hero's affinity with the party will unlock their class for use. Like the previous entries, the game has an open world design, with a day-and-night time cycle that affects in-game events, such as the availability of quests and items. The game takes place in a continuous open world that is the largest map featured in the series to date. It also features a fast travel option for quicker traversal, as well as the option to activate navigation to assist in quests.

Combat in Xenoblade Chronicles 3. The picture shows the party fighting one of the hostile wildlife spread throughout the game world.

Xenoblade Chronicles 3 has an action-based battle system, where the player controls the current lead character in real-time, and party members "auto-attack" when enemies enter their attack radius. Unlike past entries, players have the ability to swap between all six main party characters during combat. Party members use abilities called "Arts", which can deal bonus damage or inflict status ailments depending on a character's position in relation to the enemy.

Each character has a starting moveset based on a Class, which consist of different styles of fighting and abilities, but all fall under one of three main roles: "Defenders", who draw enemy aggro towards them and tank attacks by blocking or evading them; "Attackers", who deal damage and utilize positional Arts to deal increased damage or trigger certain effects, such as combos or status effects; and "Healers", who support the party with heals, buffs and debuffs. By performing actions that correspond to a character's class, the Talent Gauge will fill up and allow the character to unleash a Talent Art when full. Talent Arts are special moves unique to a class that amplifies their class' potency, such as dealing massive area-of-effect damage, forcing all enemies to target the user, or fully healing the party. In addition to experience points gained by defeating enemies, characters also gain Class Points (CP), which increase their class' Mastery level. Reaching a certain Mastery level unlocks Master Arts that can be used on other classes of opposing factions. The player can also fuse Master Arts and Class Arts into Fusion Arts, which combine the properties of both Arts into one.

The defining battle feature added in Xenoblade Chronicles 3 is the Interlink system. Early on in the game, specific pairs of characters—Noah and Mio; Eunie and Taion; and Lanz and Sena—gain the ability to fuse into Ouroboros, larger forms that are invincible and have stronger Arts. Ouroboros forms are limited by the Heat Gauge, which fills up as the form is used. When the Gauge is full, the Interlink is canceled and the pair cannot Interlink again until the Heat Gauge empties. Heat Gauge consumption is reduced with higher Interlink Levels, which increase by using Fusion Arts up to Level 3. Certain Arts only have their effects active when the Interlink Level is at 3, which encourages the player to hold off Interlinking until then.

Similar to previous Xenoblade games, the game features the "Chain Attack" mechanic. The Gauge slowly fills as party members attack, and increases further with the use of Master Arts. Filling it allows the player to chain multiple attacks together for extra damage. The Chain Attack consists of several rounds; at the start of each round, the player chooses one of three randomly available "Chain Orders". Each character's Chain Order applies a specific effect upon its completion, such as Taion's Chain Order lowering the target's physical defense. After a player selects an Order, the round begins. The goal of each round is to get over 99 TP (Tactical Points), which is rewarded on each move used during the round and increases based on certain factors, such as the current Class the character has equipped and how many times the character has been used during the Chain Attack. By achieving over 99 TP during the turn, the attack ends for that round, which applies the selected Chain Order's effects for each round after the current round. There are three different ratings that can be obtained after crossing 99 TP. These are "Amazing" (over 200 TP), "Bravo" (over 150 TP), and "Cool" (over 99 TP). The ratings determine how many selected characters are "reactivated" and available to be used in the next round and also increases the damage multiplier. The attack goes on until the Party Gauge is empty. (Note: Or when the target is defeated, if "Overkill" is set to "off" in the settings) Later in the game, Ouroboros Orders are unlocked; these orders feature both members of an Ouroboros pair attacking the enemy at once. Ouroboros Orders are activated during the Chain Attack by using both of the respective Chain Orders of an Ouroboros pair or by activating a Chain Attack while at level 3 of an Interlink. Using an Ouroboros Order automatically ends the Chain Attack.

== Plot ==
=== Setting and characters ===
Set over 1,000 years after the events of Xenoblade Chronicles (2010) and Xenoblade Chronicles 2 (2017), Xenoblade Chronicles 3 takes place in Aionios, a world made up of merged locations from the Bionis and Mechonis, the world of Xenoblade Chronicles, and Alrest, the world of Xenoblade Chronicles 2, where the nations of Keves and Agnus are at constant war. The world is divided into Colonies, each with their own giant mecha called a Ferronis, fueled by the life force of fallen enemy soldiers trapped in a Flame Clock. Each Colony is home to engineered soldiers with artificially limited lifespans of only ten years, referred to as Terms. They fight to fuel their Colony's Flame Clock and survive to the end of their tenth Term in hopes of receiving a Homecoming ceremony. Among both forces are "off-seers", soldiers who play flutes in rituals to send off the dead. The game features six main characters who have the power of Ouroboros, including two protagonists: Noah, a Kevesi off-seer accompanied by his childhood friends Lanz and Eunie; and Mio, an Agnian off-seer accompanied by her fellow soldiers Sena and Taion. The two groups are joined by their Nopon support members: Kevesi mechanic Riku and Agnian chef Manana. Other major characters include the Vandham family, who lead a faction called the Lost Numbers that consists of Guernica, his daughter Monica, and granddaughter Ghondor; Melia Antiqua from Xenoblade Chronicles and Nia from Xenoblade Chronicles 2, who are the queens of Keves and Agnus; and Moebius, an organization led by Z that manipulates the war between Keves and Agnus and is made up of powerful beings called Consuls that oversee the colonies.

The downloadable story expansion Future Redeemed is set centuries before the main game's story and takes place in the Cent-Omnia region, an area of Aionios not explored in the main game. It follows a previous group of Ouroboros that was formed after Consul N destroyed the original City. Like the main game, Future Redeemed features six party members: Matthew Vandham, a City resident searching for his sister Na'el; A, a mysterious being who travels with Matthew; Shulk and Rex, the respective protagonists of Xenoblade Chronicles and Xenoblade Chronicles 2 who now lead the Liberators to oppose Moebius; and Nikol and Glimmer, the respective children of Shulk (with Fiora) and Rex (with Pyra), who are unaware of their parentage and fight for Keves and Agnus respectively. Other major characters include Panacea and Linka, Shulk's and Rex's respective protégés; and Alpha, a being born from Alvis from Xenoblade Chronicles.

=== Story ===
Kevesi soldiers Noah, Lanz, and Eunie, as well as the Nopon Riku, are tasked with intercepting a mysterious airship and destroying its cargo. Upon reaching the target area, they encounter an Agnian squad consisting of Mio, Sena, Taion, and the Nopon Manana. A fight breaks out between the two groups, but then Guernica Vandham, the airship's sole survivor, intervenes to stop the fighting and claims he knows their "real enemy". However, when Consul D attacks him and the two groups, it forces him to activate the Ouroboros Stone he was smuggling and imbue Noah and Mio's teams with its power. D is forced to retreat, and a mortally wounded Guernica instructs the teams to head for the City at Swordmarch to find answers.

With the Consuls having ordered Keves and Agnus to hunt them down, Noah and Mio's teams band together to reach Swordmarch, liberating Colonies along the way by destroying their Flame Clocks. The Queen of Keves attacks the party with a weapon of mass destruction called the Annihilator and threatens to destroy the liberated Colonies with it. This forces the party to detour to Keves Castle, where they destroy the Annihilator and discover that the soldiers of Keves and Agnus are clones created to fight each other. They are then confronted by the Queen and Consul N, a man physically identical to Noah. The party defeats the Queen, who is revealed to be a robotic imposter.

After escaping, the party encounters the Lost Numbers, a group led by Guernica's daughter Monica. She leads them to the City, whose population consists of humans with regular lifespans who also oppose Moebius. Monica explains that Moebius orchestrated the war to harvest life energy in an endless cycle, and that the true Queens created the power of Ouroboros to oppose them before going into hiding. Monica tasks the party with infiltrating the prison underneath Agnus Castle to rescue her daughter Ghondor, who knows the Queens' location. The group stages a prison break, but is betrayed by Shania of the Lost Numbers and ambushed by N and his partner Consul M, a woman physically identical to Mio. The party is captured and taken to Agnus Castle for execution, and only Ghondor escapes. There, Noah lives through N's memories and learns that N and M lived countless lives trying and failing to stop Moebius. When his Mio died, it led N to accept a Faustian bargain with Moebius' leader Z to revive M and spend eternity with her in exchange for both of them becoming Moebius; in the process, he killed the people of the previous City. Noah and Mio are reincarnations of N and M, who split off from them and embody their hope.

On the day of the execution, it is revealed that M used her psychic powers to switch bodies with Mio and die in her place. The party drives off N, destroys the false Queen of Agnus, and awakens the true Queen of Agnus, Nia. D ambushes them and wounds Nia, but the party kills him in battle. Nia explains that in the past, the world was split into the parallel worlds of Bionis and Alrest, which would inevitably merge back together in an event called the Intersection and destroy all life in the process. Melia, Nia, and the inhabitants of both worlds established communication and collaborated to create Origin: an ark to store both worlds' data and memories and their inhabitants' souls and reboot them once they merged. However, Z captured Melia and hijacked Origin for his own ends, creating Aionios. The party storms Origin, defeating N and freeing Melia. They confront Z, who is a manifestation of humanity's fear of the future and desire to stay in the 'endless now'. N and M, whose spirits remained inside Noah and Mio, sacrifice themselves to permanently destroy Z.

With Origin reactivated, the reconstruction process for both worlds proceeds, requiring the people of Keves and Agnus to be separated and returned to their respective worlds. The party members part ways and Noah and Mio share a kiss before the worlds separate, promising to reunite one day. Everyone is restored in the new world at the moment Bionis and Alrest merged, with no memories of their experiences within Aionios. As he heads for a fireworks show, Noah hears the sound of Mio's flute playing and decides to follow the music, disappearing into the crowd.

==== Future Redeemed ====
Centuries before Moebius is defeated by Noah and his comrades, the first City is destroyed by N. Matthew Vandham, a young resident of the City who received the power of Ouroboros from his grandfather, escapes the City and encounters a mysterious woman named A. They team up to search for City survivors and kill several Consuls before finding two soldiers, Nikol and Glimmer, who are the sole survivors of their respective armies. Matthew intervenes in their battle, granting Nikol and Glimmer the power of Ouroboros and convincing them to cease hostilities against each other. Later, they encounter Shulk and Rex, the leaders of a resistance group called the Liberators who are sheltering City survivors and those who seek to escape from Moebius' rule, along with their students Panacea and Linka and their mechanic Riku.

Rex and Shulk explain that they have currently formed a truce with Moebius to fight their common foe, Alpha: an artificial intelligence derived from Alvis that is controlling Origin. When Moebius rose to power and created Aionios, Alpha concluded that Moebius, Keves, Agnus, and the original worlds should be exterminated, planning to create an entirely new world using the City survivors as its foundation. The Liberators and Moebius had previously clashed with Alpha, leaving both sides heavily weakened, and Alpha subsequently chose Matthew's sister Na'el as his vessel to regain his strength. Alpha clashes with Matthew and his comrades and attempts to convince Matthew to join his side when N intervenes. Alpha retreats and challenges Matthew to come to Origin to settle their differences. Matthew learns that N is his great-grandfather, whose destruction of the City was an unintended consequence of attempting to kill Alpha, and that A is Alpha's "conscience", having split off as a separate entity who has Alvis' memories.

Matthew and his comrades journey to Origin to confront Alpha. N attempts to stop them since he believes Alpha has a reason for luring Matthew to Origin, but is defeated. Inside Origin, Matthew finds Na'el inside a reconstruction of Earth before it was split in two by Klaus's experiment. Na'el explains that Alpha promised her a world without violence, but Matthew counters that because Alpha does not understand human emotion, any world he tries to build is doomed to fail. Alpha challenges Matthew and his party once again, and they work with N to call upon the power of Ouroboros and defeat Alpha. Afterwards, A, Shulk, and Rex enter Origin's core to replace Alpha and keep Origin operational. Before they leave, Shulk and Rex use their newfound authority to extend Nikol and Glimmer's lifespans and tell the party that they are confident Moebius will eventually be defeated, and they will return once Origin fulfills its purpose. Origin is hidden away once again, and in the process the Cent-Omnia region is destroyed.

In the aftermath, Matthew, Na'el, Nikol, Glimmer, Panacea, Linka and Riku become the future Founders of the new City, leading the City survivors and Liberators in rebuilding it and upgrading the Ouroboros Stone. Matthew decides to leave on a journey to recruit more members to join the City. Centuries later, after Origin is reactivated by Noah and his friends, the two worlds of Bionis and Alrest are merged back into one world as a single bright light approaches it from space.

== Downloadable content ==
Xenoblade Chronicles 3 featured an "Expansion Pass" available for purchase at the game's launch, which provides access to four volumes of downloadable content that were released over the following year. The first volume released alongside the game on July 29, 2022, and includes several consumables, accessories, and alternate outfit colors. The second volume released on October 13, 2022, and includes a new Challenge Mode, as well as a hero quest to unlock a new hero, Ino. The third volume was released on February 15, 2023, and includes new Challenge Mode battles, new character outfits, and a hero quest to unlock the hero Masha. The fourth and final volume was released on April 26, 2023, and includes a new story scenario, Future Redeemed, which takes place centuries before the events of the main game and follows a new cast. Completing Future Redeemed unlocks an additional challenge battle, through which the player can earn Shulk and Rex as heroes in the main game.

Amiibo figures of Noah and Mio were released on January 19, 2024. Noah's Amiibo unlocks the Consul N outfit for Noah and 'Leisure Time' outfits for him, Eunie, and Lanz, while Mio's Amiibo unlocks the Consul M outfit for Mio and 'Leisure Time' outfits for her, Taion, and Sena.

== Development ==
The first ideas for the plot of Xenoblade Chronicles 3 came prior to the development of Xenoblade Chronicles 2. According to Tetsuya Takahashi, creator of the Xenoblade series, the Mechonis sword featured on the cover of Xenoblade Chronicles and the Titan of Uraya featured on the cover of Xenoblade Chronicles 2 is what sparked the idea of Xenoblade Chronicles 3. Bringing the two worlds together, the broken sword of the Mechonis going through the wounded Titan of Uraya is the visual key of Xenoblade Chronicles 3, indicating war between the two worlds, and thus the starting idea for this game. In May 2018, Takahashi pitched Xenoblade Chronicles 3 as a new game concept to Nintendo. The first production group of Monolith Soft, known for their work on the Xenoblade series, started development on the game in August 2018 after Xenoblade Chronicles 2: Torna – The Golden Country went gold.

=== Music ===
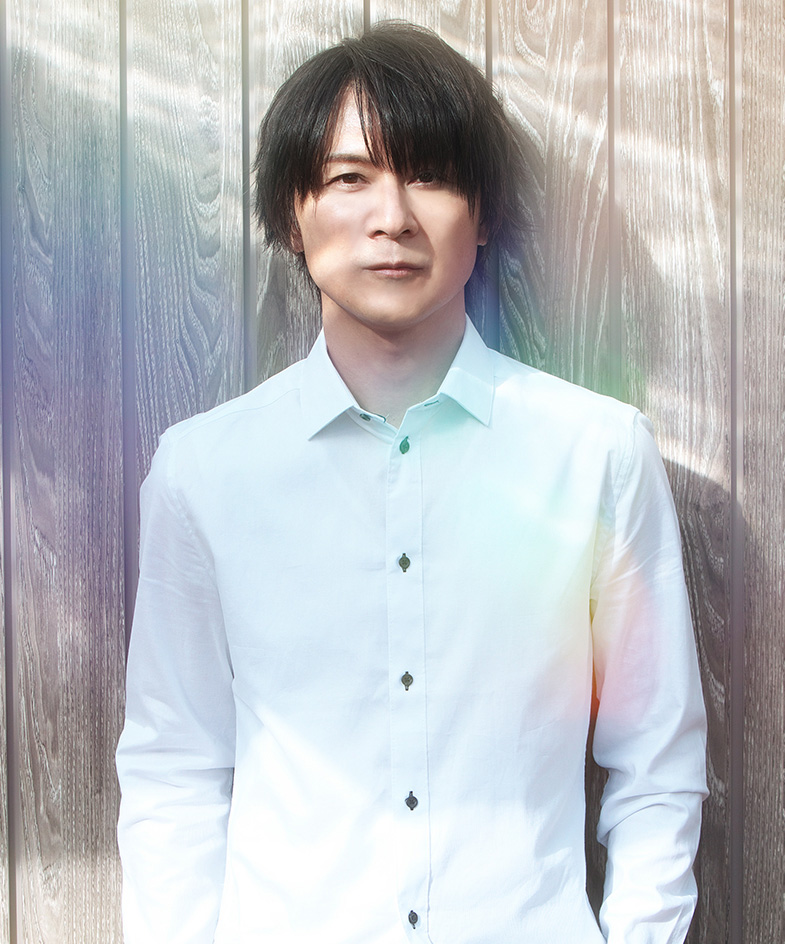
Composition of the game's soundtrack was led by Yasunori Mitsuda.

As with previous numbered games in the series, the game's soundtrack was written by Yasunori Mitsuda, Manami Kiyota, ACE (Tomori Kudo and Hiroyo "CHiCO" Yamanaka), and Kenji Hiramatsu. They were joined by Mariam Abounnasr, who arranged tracks for Xenoblade Chronicles 2, and Yutaka Kunigo. In order to create a sound that had not been heard before, Monolith Soft had custom flutes created in different sizes and tuned to different scales resembling flutes from the game. The first track Mitsuda worked on for the game was "A Life Sent On", its main theme. Takahashi told Mitsuda in advance to interweave the two melodies of Noah and Mio into a single piece of music, and Mitsuda seemed to have thought that creating the flutes would enable him to express himself easier. As with Xenoblade Chronicles 2, the Irish choral ensemble Anúna assisted in recording vocals for the game. Members Aisling and Lauren McGlynn provided vocals for tracks themed around Ouroboros and Moebius respectively, while Sara Weeda sung "A Step Away" and the ending theme, "Where We Belong". The Future Redeemed expansion features a new ending theme, "Future Awaits", sung by Joanne Hogg, who previously sang the ending themes of Xenogears and Xenosaga Episode I.

An original soundtrack was released on August 2, 2023. It was revealed alongside the soundtrack to Xenoblade Chronicles: Definitive Edition and the Xenoblade Chronicles Original Soundtrack Trinity Box, a limited edition package featuring the soundtracks for all three mainline games in the series. The Xenoblade Chronicles 3 Original Soundtrack was announced to be available in a regular edition and a limited edition containing 1/3 scale replicas of the flutes used by Noah and Mio throughout the game's story, as well as an 80-page deluxe booklet with liner notes and interviews with the composers. The limited edition was revealed to be releasing sooner than the regular edition on July 29, 2023, exactly one year after the game's original release. Both editions also contain the music for Xenoblade Chronicles 3: Future Redeemed.

== Release ==
Xenoblade Chronicles 3 was announced in February 2022, and was initially set for release in September. It was later shifted to an earlier release date of July 29. The game is described as featuring a narrative that depicts the respective futures for the worlds of the previous two entries. Following the announcement, a blog post on the official Nintendo website revealed preliminary details about the game's development. Takahashi was confirmed to be working on the game in an executive director position, while various other returning staff members from previous Xenoblade games were revealed to be reprising their duties, including the composing team behind the first two entries and Xenoblade Chronicles 2 lead character designer Masatsugu Saito, returning to work on the game's art alongside Xenosaga and Xenoblade Chronicles artist Koichi Mugitani.

=== Special edition ===
A collector's edition was announced on April 19, 2022, to be sold exclusively on My Nintendo Store, following the announcement of the July 29th release date. The collector's edition contains an art book, a steelbook case, and an outer collectible packaging. Preorders opened on June 7, but due to unforeseen demand, the My Nintendo Store crashed on that day, logging various users out, leaving many unable to preorder the game. Furthermore, as a result of the release date being moved up in the year, production for the collector's edition ended up being hindered, causing certain Nintendo stores to sell the contents of the collector's edition, minus the game, as a separate item in the UK, while the extra contents of the North American special edition were delayed to ship in Fall 2022.

=== Artbook ===
An artbook, Xenoblade 3 Official Artworks: Aionios Moments, was released on April 1, 2024 and published by Kadokawa.

=== Nintendo Switch 2 Edition ===
On June 9, 2026, during a Nintendo Direct presentation, Nintendo announced updated releases of the Xenoblade Chronicles trilogy for Nintendo Switch 2. Xenoblade Chronicles 3 – Nintendo Switch 2 Edition is scheduled to be released on December 3, 2026. The port features support for higher framerate and resolution, including in cutscenes, and adds voice acting for event scenes. The port also adds Rex and Mythra's daughter Shimmer as a new hero and a Vampire Survivors–like game mode called "Heroes' Vault".

== Reception ==
Reception

Aggregate scores
Aggregator	Score
Metacritic	89/100
OpenCritic	93% recommend (Note: Based on 131 reviews); 100% recommend(Future Redeemed) (Note: Based on 19 reviews)

Review scores
Publication	Score
Destructoid	9.5/10
Digital Trends	4/5
Eurogamer	Essential
Famitsu	9/10, 9/10, 9/10, 9/10
Game Informer	7.25/10
GameSpot	8/10
IGN	8/10
Nintendo Life	10/10
Nintendo World Report	9/10
PCMag	3.5/5
Shacknews	9/10
TechRadar	4.5/5
Video Games Chronicle	5/5
Trusted Reviews	4/5

Xenoblade Chronicles 3 received "generally favorable reviews" according to review aggregator website Metacritic.

Nintendo Life enjoyed the changes to the combat system, specifically praising the new ability to combine character abilities, "Interlinking is a slick addition to the action here, it adds real drama and excitement to battles and is, most importantly, easy to get your head around." Destructoid liked the visuals, saying they were impressive despite the Switch's constraints, "Xenoblade Chronicles 3 is impressive looking by any standard. I took a ton of screenshots of this gorgeous world for fun." While feeling the ending did not adequately resolve the story, Nintendo World Report wrote the game had the best balanced combat in the series, "It is challenging yet excellently paced. I rarely found myself over or underleveled." IGN criticized the pacing of the game, saying the included filler was unnecessary with the 150-hour runtime, "one section that has you go undercover to perform menial tasks, or another that has you trotting across the world to collect pieces of metal, and I often felt like my time wasn't being respected." GameSpot praised the new Master Arts for continuously evolving the combat system, "I am well over 120 hours in now and I am still unlocking new Master Arts, leveling up different classes, and uncovering powerful new tactics." Game Informer felt the open-world zones were lifeless and generic, lacking the memorable landmarks and vistas of earlier entries, "Beyond challenging monsters, collecting respawnable drops, and recruiting heroes at Keves or Agnus settlements, there's not much to do or see."

PCMag wrote that the Switch seemed unable to keep up with the game's large vistas and combat, "here are noticeable resolution drops and object pop-in abounds. The frame rate isn't particularly steady, either, and the game can chug at times." Eurogamer praised the game for capturing the sense of freedom found in older JRPGs, "the sensation of running through endless fields of long grass with your companions, facing impossible odds with a spring in your step." Polygon liked the new optional content, feeling it was some of the series' best, "There are well over 100 side quests, and though their objectives could be rote, each told me something about how one lives in this world. It made me care about Aionios as an amalgamation of the land and its peoples."

=== Sales ===
Xenoblade Chronicles 3 was the bestselling retail game during its first week of release in Japan, with 112,728 physical copies being sold. It was also the bestselling physical game during its first week of release in the UK, where it had the biggest launch for the entire Xeno franchise in terms of copies sold. As of March 2023, it has sold 1.86 million copies.

=== Accolades ===
Xenoblade Chronicles 3 received multiple end-of-year accolades, including "Game of the Year" nominations at the New York Game Awards, Golden Joystick Awards, and The Game Awards. At IGN's "Best of 2022" awards, Xenoblade Chronicles 3 won the category of "Best RPG".

Awards and nominations for Xenoblade Chronicles 3
Year	Award	Category	Result	Ref.
2022	Golden Joystick Awards	Ultimate Game of the Year	Nominated (Note: Voted #4 out of twelve nominees for Ultimate Game of the Year)	
2022	Golden Joystick Awards	Best Audio	Nominated	
2022	Golden Joystick Awards	Nintendo Game of the Year	Nominated	
2022	The Game Awards 2022	Game of the Year	Nominated	
2022	The Game Awards 2022	Best Score/Music	Nominated	
2022	The Game Awards 2022	Best Role Playing Game	Nominated	
2023	New York Game Awards	Big Apple Award for Best Game of the Year	Nominated	
2023	26th Annual D.I.C.E. Awards	Role-Playing Game of the Year	Nominated	
2023	Famitsu/Dengeki Game Awards 2022	Best Scenario	Nominated	
2023	Famitsu/Dengeki Game Awards 2022	Best Music	Nominated	
2023	Famitsu/Dengeki Game Awards 2022	Best RPG	Won	
2023	Famitsu/Dengeki Game Awards 2022	Best Voice Actor (Minami Tsuda as Mio)	Nominated	
2023	Japan Game Awards	Award for Excellence	Won	
