= Tetsuya Takahashi =

Japanese video game designer

- 高橋 哲哉
- Born: November 18, 1966 (age 59); Shizuoka Prefecture, Japan
- Occupations: CCO and Director of Monolith Soft
- Employer(s): Nihon Falcom (1988–1990); Square (1990–1999); Monolith Soft (1999–present)
- Known for: Xeno series
- Spouse: Soraya Saga

Tetsuya Takahashi (高橋 哲哉, Takahashi Tetsuya) (born November 18, 1966) is a Japanese video game designer, writer and director. Takahashi worked at Square in the 90s as a graphic designer and graphic director, participating on some of their most well-received titles such as Final Fantasy V, Final Fantasy VI and Chrono Trigger, before directing and co-writing Xenogears. He left Square in 1999 to co-found Monolith Soft, where he would develop the Xenosaga and Xenoblade series with Namco and Nintendo respectively, being the executive director of Xenoblade since the first entry in the series.

He is married to Soraya Saga, who also worked with him at Square Enix, as well as on Xenosaga and Soma Bringer.

Takahashi is one of the founders of Monolith Soft, senior director and chief creative officer at the company, as well as part of its board of directors.

== Biography ==
Takahashi was born on November 18, 1966, in Shizuoka Prefecture, Japan. He began his career in video games in the 1980s working with Nihon Falcom.

=== Squaresoft ===
Takahashi worked on Final Fantasy VI, including the design of the Magitek armor from the opening scene of the game. He also was the graphics director on Chrono Trigger.

In 1995 he married his Squaresoft coworker Kaori Tanaka, better known by her pen name Soraya Saga.

=== Xenogears ===
Originally submitted as a potential plot for Final Fantasy VII, it was made into its own project after being judged too dark and complicated for a fantasy game by others at Squaresoft.

=== Monolith Soft ===
While at Squaresoft, Takahashi realized that the company intended to focus on the Final Fantasy series, and that sequels to the Xenogears series were becoming unlikely. He then decided to leave and start his own software development company. In October 1999 he left Squaresoft to start a new company, Monolith Soft, together with Hirohide Sugiura.

=== Xenoblade Chronicles ===
Following a meeting about the game Soma Bringer, Takahashi imagined what a game would be like where the world was actually the body of a "giant god". Takahashi attempted a more "mature" writing style for the game, and said he expects to continue in the same vein in the future. The game references both Japanese and Western RPG styles, referring to the western style in some cases "without thinking about it". In this way, the game is designed to appeal to fans of "text-based" JRPGs and western RPGs at the same time. Minor localizations were made for the American and European release, as well as bug fixes and game balancing. Originally Takahashi tried a more traditional turned based combat system, but he later incorporated a battle system where the protagonist can see into the future as a gameplay mechanic.

=== Xenoblade Chronicles X ===
Takahashi and Monolith Soft were revealed to be working on a new game for the Wii U in September 2012. It was later revealed in the January 2013 Nintendo Direct under the tentative title X, and shown further at E3 2013. For E3 2014, it was announced with the title Xenoblade Chronicles X.

== Video games ==
Year	Title	Role
1989	Ys III: Wanderers from Ys	Monster graphics
1989	Dragon Slayer: The Legend of Heroes	Artist
1991	Final Fantasy IV	Battle graphics
1992	Romancing SaGa	Field map design
1992	Final Fantasy V	Field map
1994	Final Fantasy VI	Graphic director
1995	Front Mission	Graphic design
1995	Chrono Trigger	Graphic director
1995	Seiken Densetsu 3	Graphic design: BG
1998	Xenogears	Director, scenario, lyricist
2002	Xenosaga Episode I	Director
2004	Xenosaga Episode II	Original author, supervisor
2004	Xenosaga: Pied Piper	Story writer
2006	Xenosaga I & II	Scenario, original author
2006	Xenosaga Episode III	Author, music coordinator, supervisor of scenario and database
2008	Soma Bringer	Producer, game designer
2008	Super Robot Wars OG Saga: Endless Frontier	Staff
2010	Xenoblade Chronicles	Executive director, scenario, concept, original lyrics
2015	Xenoblade Chronicles X	Executive director, concept
2015	Project X Zone 2	Supervision & cooperation
2017	Xenoblade Chronicles 2	Executive director, scenario, original lyrics
2018	Xenoblade Chronicles 2: Torna – The Golden Country	Executive director, scenario, original lyrics, japanese voice direction
2020	Xenoblade Chronicles: Definitive Edition	Executive director, original lyrics, japanese voice direction
2022	Xenoblade Chronicles 3	Executive director, scenario, original lyrics, japanese voice direction
2023	Xenoblade Chronicles 3: Future Redeemed	Executive director, scenario, original lyrics, japanese voice direction
2025	Xenoblade Chronicles X: Definitive Edition	Executive director, scenario
2027	Xenoblade Genesis	Executive director
