= Monolith Soft =

Japanese video game developer

Monolith Software Inc.

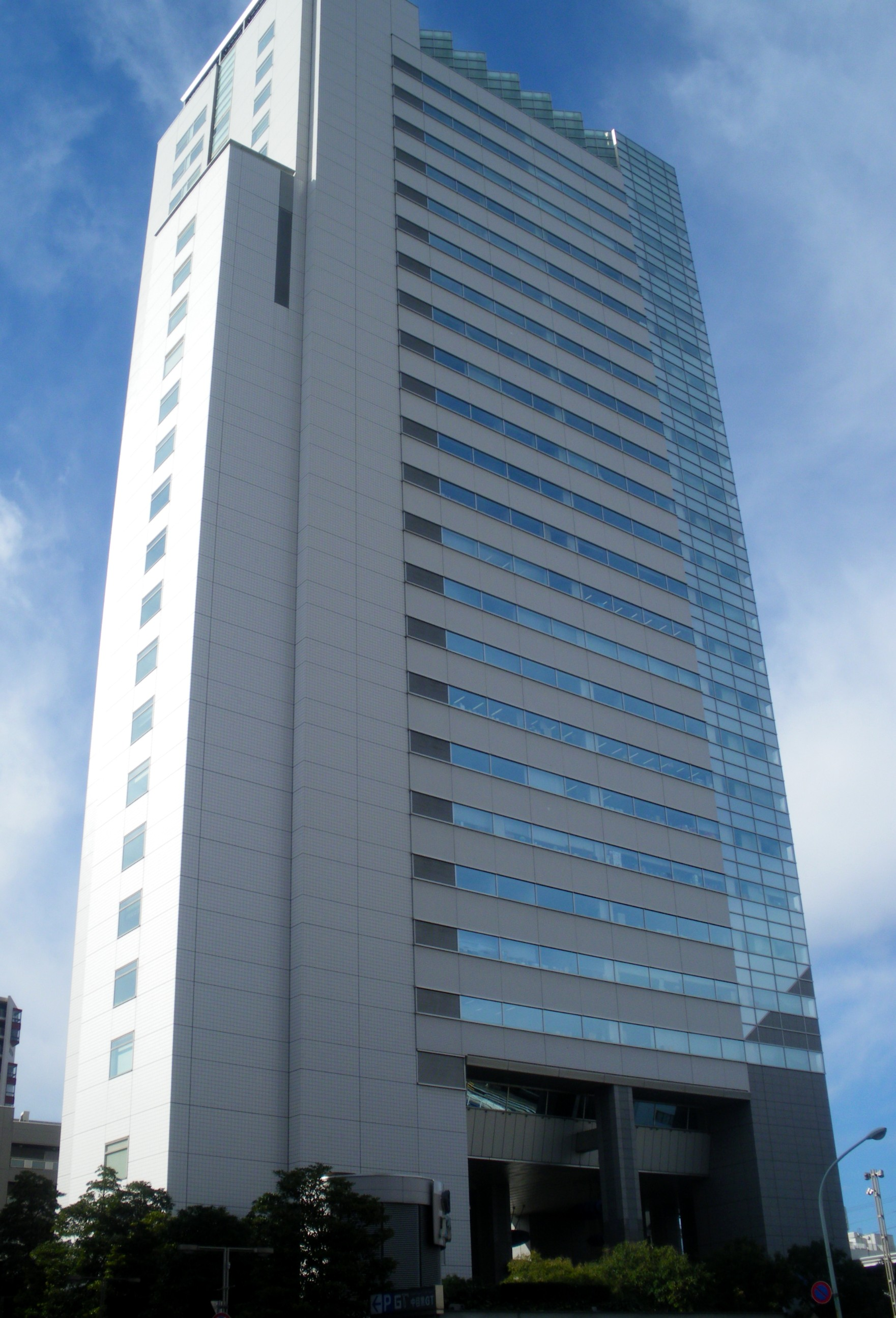
- Headquarters in Nakameguro GT Tower's 12th floor in Meguro, Tokyo, Japan
- Trade name: Monolith Soft
- Native name: 株式会社モノリスソフト
- Romanized name: Kabushiki gaisha Monorisu Sofuto
- Type: Subsidiary
- Industry: Video games
- Genre: Video game developer
- Founded: 1 October 1999; 27 years ago in Tokyo, Japan
- Founders: Hirohide Sugiura; Tetsuya Takahashi; Yasuyuki Honne
- Headquarters: Meguro, Tokyo, Japan
- Number of locations: 3 (Note: As of 2022, Monolith Soft has 3 studios in the following locations: one studio in Meguro, Tokyo, one studio in Shinagawa, and one studio in Minami-ku, Kyoto.) (2022)
- Key people: Representative Director and CEO; Hirohide Sugiura; Directors; Tetsuya Takahashi; Tadashi Nomura; Tomohiro Hagiwara; Yasuyuki Honne
- Products: Games
- Brands: Xenosaga series; Baten Kaitos series; Xenoblade series; Project X Zone series
- Net income: ▲¥491 million (US$3.1 million) (2020)
- Number of employees: 344 (2025)
- Parent: Namco (1999–2006); Namco Bandai Games (2006–2007); Nintendo (2007–present)
- Website: www.monolithsoft.co.jp

Monolith Software Inc., (Note: Japanese: 株式会社モノリスソフト, Hepburn: Kabushiki gaisha Monorisu Sofuto) trading as Monolith Soft, is a Japanese video game developer based in Tokyo. It is best known for creating the Xeno series. Originally founded in 1999 by Square alumnus Tetsuya Takahashi as a studio under Namco (later Namco Bandai Games), it was bought out by Nintendo in 2007. Their first project was the Xenosaga series, a spiritual successor to the Square-developed Xenogears. With Nintendo, they developed the Xenoblade series in addition to developmental assistance on Nintendo-developed games. Multiple Square alumni would join Takahashi at Monolith Soft, including Hirohide Sugiura and Yasuyuki Honne.

In addition to the Xeno series, Monolith Soft worked on other projects including Baten Kaitos and Namco × Capcom, the precursor to their later Project X Zone series, along with assisting on projects from other developers. While several of its games have released on the PlayStation 2, all of its games have released on Nintendo platforms following the acquisition.

As of 2022, Monolith Soft operates in three locations in Japan; its main office in Meguro, Tokyo and the secondary Osaki Studio similarly based in Tokyo, who produce the company's original video game properties; and a studio in Kyoto with mainly artists as its employees, which acts as an assisting developer for both Monolith Soft Tokyo and for some Nintendo internal franchises. According to an interview published on the website of the company in February 2022, Monolith Soft's Kyoto studio has over 30 employees, which would leave the Tokyo studios with roughly 230 staff in total.

The design approaches of Monolith Soft have shifted over its lifetime, with early games such as Xenosaga and Baten Kaitos being distinguished by a narrative-heavy approach, while later games have focused more on gameplay. The company's stated goals are to create projects with wide creative freedom and to allow younger developers to contribute to these projects. The company is also notable for its focus on promoting a comfortable working environment with little to no overtime in contrast to the majority of other Japanese game developers, alongside collaborating with other studios and companies.

== History ==
=== Origins ===
Monolith Soft was founded by Tetsuya Takahashi, a developer who had previously worked at Nihon Falcom and later at Square, in which the latter was merged into Enix in 2003 to form Square Enix. While at Square, he and his wife Kaori Tanaka (also known as Soraya Saga) would contribute to the development of multiple games including entries in the Final Fantasy series. Following their work on Final Fantasy VI, Takahashi and Tanaka created a proposal for Final Fantasy VII; while deemed too dark for the Final Fantasy series, they were allowed to develop it as their own project titled Xenogears. Takahashi's ambition and drive prompted Final Fantasy creator Hironobu Sakaguchi, then Executive Vice President at Square, to appoint him as director. Takahashi also wrote the script with Tanaka. Following the release of Xenogears, Takahashi became dissatisfied with Square's business approach at the time, which prioritized their major intellectual properties including Final Fantasy. This left Takahashi with no funding or creative room to develop further independent projects or continue his planned Xenogears series.

In 1999, Takahashi talked with Hirohide Sugiura, who had likewise worked at Square and was beginning to feel frustrated due to a lack of creative freedom. After discussing the matter, the two decided to create their own company and pursue projects they wanted to create. When planning their new company, Takahashi and Sugiura decided that they needed a publisher with substantial market presence to help them rather than being an independent studio. Takahashi and Sugiura approached multiple companies for support, but most of the companies they contacted outright rejected their offer as they believed that Monolith Soft should be an independent company. However, Namco were interested in investing into Monolith Soft as a dedicated subsidiary, while handling logistics and marketing so that the core staff could focus on game development. An important supporter of Monolith Soft was Namco's founder Masaya Nakamura, who shared many of Takahashi and Sugiura's goals and ideals. Monolith Soft is noted as being one of a group of video game companies—alongside Sacnoth, Love-de-Lic and Mistwalker—founded by Square staff who had worked on notable games produced during the 1990s. The company was officially founded on 1 October 1999 by Takahashi, Sugiura, and Yasuyuki Honne, who had worked at Square on both the Chrono series and with Takahashi on Xenogears. The company's offices were originally based in Yokohama.

=== 2000s ===
==== Namco era ====
Monolith Soft's first project was Xenosaga Episode I, a role-playing game (RPG) for the PlayStation 2. Xenosaga was a spiritual successor to Xenogears; development began in 2000 when enough staff had been gathered, lasting approximately two years. As with Xenogears, the game was scripted by Takahashi and Tanaka, who planned out the Xenosaga series as a hexalogy. In 2001, Namco producer Shinji Noguchi and Monolith Soft's Tadashi Nomura conceived a new IP for the GameCube unconnected to Xenosaga. Titled Baten Kaitos: Eternal Wings and the Lost Ocean, development began six months after the concept was formed, with Honne acting as director. The game development staff of the company was now divided between the Xenosaga series and Baten Kaitos, the latter a project driven by the younger developers at Monolith Soft. Baten Kaitos was co-developed with tri-Crescendo, which came about due to both submitting designs to Namco, which suggested they work together on the project. In 2003, Honne was approached by then-CEO of Nintendo Satoru Iwata about developing a new entry in the Mother series for GameCube. Honne created a pitch themed around a "felt-style recreation of 80s America", but the idea was firmly rejected by series creator Shigesato Itoi.

Following the release of the first Xenosaga game, Takahashi and Sugiura reassessed the internal structure of Monolith Soft, determining that the current lead developers were too old, clashing with their intended goals for the company to foster young talent. With this mindset, Takahashi stepped down from his lead role in the Xenosaga series. He continued to work for the company in a supervisory role by providing the series' scenario drafts, while younger staff continued the series development. This move also allowed Takahashi a greater degree of creative freedom in a number of projects as opposed to being tied to a single series. In May 2002, Monolith Soft moved from Yokohama to their current offices in Meguro, Tokyo. The next entry in the Xenosaga series, Xenosaga Episode II, began development under a new team following the release of Episode I. While developing Episode II, the staff shifted their focus from the main series to help tell the story through multiple media. Among these additional projects was Xenosaga: Pied Piper, a spin-off title for mobile devices co-developed with Tom Create and Namco Mobile. Pied Piper was Tanaka's last work on the Xenosaga series. Beginning in 2003, Monolith Soft also developed Namco × Capcom, a PlayStation 2 crossover game featuring characters from various Namco and Capcom video games. The idea was proposed by Monolith Soft, with development lasting two years.

In 2006, Monolith Soft was involved in four released games; Dirge of Cerberus: Final Fantasy VII, Xenosaga I & II, Xenosaga Episode III and Baten Kaitos Origins. Dirge of Cerberus was primarily developed by Square Enix with Monolith Soft providing development support. Xenosaga I & II was an expanded re-imagining of the first two games for the Nintendo DS, and is notable for being Monolith Soft's first title for handheld game consoles. The game was co-developed by Tom Create in collaboration with multiple staff who had worked on the anime adaptation for the first Xenosaga. Xenosaga Episode III began development in 2004. While Xenosaga was planned as a hexalogy, the new team decided to restructure the series as a trilogy. Episode III was the last planned entry in the series, with further games depending on its commercial success. The mixed commercial and critical performance of the Xenosaga series left Monolith Soft's development staff in a state of low morale. Baten Kaitos Origins, again co-developed with tri-Crescendo, was released late in the lifespan of the GameCube shortly before the release of Nintendo's new home console the Wii. A Baten Kaitos game for the DS was also in development at Monolith Soft, but Namco, which by this point had merged with Bandai to become Namco Bandai Games, cancelled the project. A third Baten Kaitos game was in early development for "a long time" according to Honne, but was cancelled due to unspecified circumstances. Future efforts with the series depended upon both fan demand and the cooperation of IP owners Namco.

==== Nintendo era ====
According to Sugiura, Monolith Soft's relations with Namco soured considerably after Nakamura retired as head of Namco in 2002, three years before the merger with Bandai. The company underwent changes and Monolith Soft felt they were being given less creative freedom, and the newly created Namco Bandai was less willing to take creative risks. The company then received consultation from Shinji Hatano, an executive director at Nintendo, who advised them to continue creating innovative projects. Spurred on by Hatano's supportive attitude, Monolith Soft decided to break away from Namco Bandai to become a Nintendo subsidiary; this provided Monolith Soft creative freedom in exchange for software development exclusivity for Nintendo platforms. Nintendo's purchasing of the majority of Monolith Soft's shares from Namco Bandai Holdings was publicly announced in April 2007. Nintendo became the majority shareholder of Monolith Soft with 80% of shares, while Namco Bandai retained 16% and remained as a development partner. Namco Bandai stated that the exchange of Monolith Soft shares would strengthen their relationship with Nintendo. The remaining shares were divided between Takahashi, Sugiura and Honne. By the beginning of April 2011, Namco Bandai had sold its remaining 400 shares in Monolith Soft to Nintendo, getting Nintendo 96% of the shares. By December 2024, Nintendo fully acquired 100% of Monolith Soft's shares. In a statement on the matter, Iwata said that the deal was initiated due to the positive relations between Sugiura and Nintendo, and the two companies' parallel design and development philosophies.

Monolith Soft's first releases following its acquisition by Nintendo were Soma Bringer and Super Robot Wars OG Saga: Endless Frontier for the Nintendo DS and Disaster: Day of Crisis for the Wii, all released in 2008. Soma Bringer was the company's first portable title to be developed entirely in-house, it was designed as an experience driven by gameplay rather than narrative. Multiple returning staff from the Xenosaga series including Takahashi and Tanaka contributed to the game. Super Robot Wars OG Saga: Endless Frontier, a crossover RPG, was co-developed with Namco Bandai and featured cameo appearances from Monolith Soft's Xenosaga series. Disaster: Day of Crisis, Monolith Soft's first and to-date only non-RPG game, was intended as a showcase for the capabilities of the Wii. Due to quality concerns and Monolith Soft's unfamiliarity with the Wii hardware, it was delayed from its planned 2006 release by two years. Monolith Soft was also chosen to develop Dragon Ball Z: Attack of the Saiyans due to their pedigree at developing RPGs. During this period they assisted in the development of Super Smash Bros. Brawl.

From mid 2006, Takahashi was working on a separate project; struck by an idea of rival civilizations emerging on the frozen bodies of two warring gods, he and Honne constructed a model of the two gods to better visualize the idea. After bringing their idea to Nintendo producer Hitoshi Yamagami, the team began development in 2007. Takahashi later stated that the game's development acted as a means of boosting company morale after the failure of the Xenosaga series. The director, Koh Kojima, started his directorial debut with this game, having previously written the scenario for Baten Kaitos Origins. This game also saw a shift away from the narrative-heavy approach of Monolith Soft's earlier work, which Takahashi stated had been called out as old-fashioned. In contrast to many earlier Monolith Soft projects, the game was designed with an international release in mind. The intended scale of the game caused problems, and Takahashi reluctantly went to Yamagami with a list of proposals to cut down the game to a suitable size as he was accustomed to doing for previous projects. Yamagami rejected all of Takahashi's suggestions, instead persuading Nintendo to keep supporting the project and allow the team to complete their work as envisioned. Originally titled Monado: Beginning of the World, Iwata had the title changed to honor Takahashi's previous work on Xenogears and the Xenosaga franchise. The new title was Xenoblade, localized as Xenoblade Chronicles outside of Japan.

=== 2010s ===
Xenoblade Chronicles released in 2010 in Japan, and after multiple delays, also released worldwide to unexpected critical and commercial success. Also released that year was Super Robot Wars OG Saga: Endless Frontier Exceed, a sequel to the original game co-developed with Namco Bandai Games that expanded upon the mechanics of the original and featured further Xenosaga cameos. In 2011, Monolith Soft founded a new studio in Kyoto, closer to Nintendo's home base so the two companies could better interact with each other. Despite some initial reservations, the staff quickly settled into their new offices and the studio became a lauded place of work. Rather than original projects, the Kyoto branch acts as a supplementary studio, providing support for Monolith Soft and on Nintendo's in-house projects. The Kyoto branch has provided support for The Legend of Zelda: Skyward Sword (2011), Animal Crossing: New Leaf (2012), Pikmin 3 (2013), The Legend of Zelda: A Link Between Worlds (2013), Splatoon, (2015), Animal Crossing: Happy Home Designer (2015), Splatoon 2 (2017), and Animal Crossing: New Horizons (2020).

The next game released from Monolith Soft, again in collaboration with Namco Bandai Games, was Project X Zone for the Nintendo 3DS. A successor to Namco × Capcom, the game received development support from and featured characters from franchises owned by Namco Bandai, Capcom and Sega. Following the release of Xenoblade Chronicles, Monolith Soft was also working on a follow-up titled Xenoblade Chronicles X for the Wii U. A spiritual successor to the first game, and the company's first high-definition video game title, Xenoblade Chronicles X shifted from a story-driven to an open world gameplay-driven structure. The incorporation of an extensive multiplayer element resulted in its release being delayed and the narrative being substantially altered. Monolith Soft also developed a sequel to Project X Zone, Project X Zone 2. In addition to changing the character roster selected from Sega, Capcom and Bandai Namco, the game introduced characters from Nintendo's Fire Emblem Awakening in addition to characters from Xenoblade Chronicles.

During the last development stages of Xenoblade Chronicles X, Monolith Soft began work on a new Xenoblade title for the Nintendo Switch. Titled Xenoblade Chronicles 2, the game returned to the story-driven structure of Xenoblade Chronicles while building upon the gameplay and technology of Xenoblade Chronicles X. One of the game's story prototypes was later turned into an expansion titled Xenoblade Chronicles 2: Torna – The Golden Country, released in 2018. In addition to this, Monolith Soft also began development of an action game, hiring new staff for the project. The company opened new studios in Nakameguro and Iidabashi during 2017 and 2018. The 1st Production team, known for their work on the Xenoblade series, started hiring staff for development of a new RPG project in October 2018. In March 2019, the 2nd Production team started hiring staff for a new project in The Legend of Zelda franchise. Between 2018 and 2019, the Iidabashi studio closed. In April 2019, in the wake of high revenue during the 2018–2019 fiscal period, the company opened a new studio in Ōsaki, Tokyo.

=== 2020s ===
In 2020, Monolith Soft released Xenoblade Chronicles Definitive Edition for the Nintendo Switch, a remaster to the original title released in 2010. In 2022 Monolith Soft released Xenoblade Chronicles 3. In 2023, the studio also provided development support to The Legend of Zelda: Tears of the Kingdom.

Nintendo acquired full ownership of Monolith Soft by December 2024. In 2025, the studio released a remastered version of Xenoblade Chronicles X on the Nintendo Switch.

== Development organization ==
Monolith Soft currently has three different buildings in Japan dedicated to development: two in Tokyo and one in Kyoto. The company has shared the organization of its divisions over the years, being organized as the following:

- Monolith Soft Tokyo, 1st Production Team: Headed by Tetsuya Takahashi, this is the group responsible for the development of the Xenoblade franchise and the games lead in development by Monolith Soft, being the largest team in the studio with over 140 staff.
- Monolith Soft Tokyo, 2nd Production Team: This group consists of the Monolith Soft staff in Tokyo that assisted on the development of The Legend of Zelda: Breath of the Wild and The Legend of Zelda: Tears of the Kingdom as a support studio in game design, programming, and graphics, with around 50 employees working on Breath of the Wild and after hiring more staff over the years for the group, having around 110 employees working on Tears of the Kingdom, in both cases supporting over 400 developers from the lead developer Nintendo EPD Production Group No. 3. Staff in this group previously worked on Xenoblade Chronicles, The Legend of Zelda: Skyward Sword, and Xenoblade Chronicles X before the team was created to work as support for the Nintendo Switch mainline Zelda titles. The team also consists of newer staff who were recruited following the completion of Breath of the Wild, including artists, programmers, planners, designers, and project managers who began working in the company during the development of Tears of the Kingdom.
- Monolith Soft Kyoto: Founded in 2011, Monolith Soft's Kyoto studio is a branch dedicated to support other titles, having no lead development roles since it has been established. It has assisted in projects worked on by the Tokyo studio like the Xenoblade series, as well as Nintendo EPD projects the Tokyo studio was not involved with, such as Pikmin 3, The Legend of Zelda: A Link Between Worlds, the Splatoon series, the Animal Crossing series and Mario Kart World. The staff at the Kyoto Studio is mainly focused in art, graphics and asset creation, having around 30 employees.

== Games ==
=== Lead development ===
This list is for games to which Monolith Soft contributed substantially, being either a major co-developer or the main developer.

List of games developed by Monolith Soft
Year	Title	Platform	Publisher	Ref.
2002	Xenosaga Episode I	PlayStation 2	Namco	
2003	Baten Kaitos: Eternal Wings and the Lost Ocean (Note: Co-developed with tri-Crescendo.)	GameCube	Namco	
2004	Xenosaga Freaks	PlayStation 2	Namco	
2004	Xenosaga Episode II	PlayStation 2	Namco	
2004	Xenosaga: Pied Piper (Note: Co-developed with Namco Mobile.) (Note: Co-developed with Tom Create.)	Mobile devices	Namco	
2005	Namco × Capcom	PlayStation 2	Namco	
2006	Baten Kaitos Origins	GameCube	Nintendo	
2006	Xenosaga I & II	Nintendo DS	Namco	
2006	Xenosaga Episode III	PlayStation 2	Namco Bandai Games	
2008	Soma Bringer	Nintendo DS	Nintendo	
2008	Super Robot Wars OG Saga: Endless Frontier (Note: Co-developed with Banpresto.)	Nintendo DS	Namco Bandai Games	
2008	Disaster: Day of Crisis	Wii	Nintendo	
2009	Dragon Ball Z: Attack of the Saiyans	Nintendo DS	Namco Bandai Games	
2010	Super Robot Wars OG Saga: Endless Frontier Exceed	Nintendo DS	Namco Bandai Games	
2010	Xenoblade Chronicles	Wii	Nintendo	
2012	Project X Zone	Nintendo 3DS	Namco Bandai Games	
2015	Xenoblade Chronicles X	Wii U	Nintendo	
2015	Project X Zone 2	Nintendo 3DS	Bandai Namco Entertainment	
2017	Xenoblade Chronicles 2	Nintendo Switch; Nintendo Switch 2	Nintendo	
2018	Xenoblade Chronicles 2: Torna – The Golden Country	Nintendo Switch; Nintendo Switch 2	Nintendo	
2020	Xenoblade Chronicles: Definitive Edition	Nintendo Switch; Nintendo Switch 2	Nintendo	
2022	Xenoblade Chronicles 3	Nintendo Switch; Nintendo Switch 2	Nintendo	
2025	Xenoblade Chronicles X: Definitive Edition	Nintendo Switch; Nintendo Switch 2	Nintendo	
2027	Xenoblade Genesis	Nintendo Switch 2	Nintendo	

=== Support development ===
This list is for titles where a studio of Monolith Soft acted in a lesser supporting role to the main developer. Refers to development organization for more information about the groups responsible for support development.

List of games with assistance by Monolith Soft
Year	Title	Platform	Publisher	Additional notes	Ref.
2006	Dirge of Cerberus: Final Fantasy VII (Note: Development cooperation for Square Enix.)	PlayStation 2	Square Enix	Monolith Soft Tokyo	
2008	Super Smash Bros. Brawl (Note: Development cooperation for Nintendo's ad-hoc development team for Super Smash Bros. Brawl.)	Wii	Nintendo	Monolith Soft Tokyo	
2011	The Legend of Zelda: Skyward Sword (Note: Development cooperation for Nintendo Entertainment Analysis & Development.)	Wii	Nintendo	Monolith Soft Tokyo	
2012	Animal Crossing: New Leaf	Nintendo 3DS	Nintendo	Monolith Soft Kyoto	
2013	Pikmin 3	Wii U	Nintendo	Monolith Soft Kyoto	
2013	The Legend of Zelda: A Link Between Worlds	Nintendo 3DS	Nintendo	Monolith Soft Kyoto	
2015	Splatoon	Wii U	Nintendo	Monolith Soft Kyoto	
2015	Animal Crossing: Happy Home Designer	Nintendo 3DS	Nintendo	Monolith Soft Kyoto	
2017	The Legend of Zelda: Breath of the Wild (Note: Development cooperation for Nintendo Entertainment Planning & Development.)	Nintendo Switch	Nintendo	Monolith Soft Tokyo 2nd Production Team	
2017	The Legend of Zelda: Breath of the Wild	Wii U	Nintendo	Monolith Soft Tokyo 2nd Production Team	
2017	Splatoon 2	Nintendo Switch	Nintendo	Monolith Soft Kyoto	
2020	Animal Crossing: New Horizons	Nintendo Switch	Nintendo	Monolith Soft Kyoto	
2022	Splatoon 3	Nintendo Switch	Nintendo	Monolith Soft Kyoto	
2023	The Legend of Zelda: Tears of the Kingdom	Nintendo Switch	Nintendo	Monolith Soft Tokyo 2nd Production Team	
2025	Mario Kart World	Nintendo Switch 2	Nintendo	Monolith Soft Kyoto	
2026	Splatoon Raiders	Nintendo Switch 2	Nintendo	Monolith Soft Kyoto	
2026	The Legend of Zelda: Ocarina of Time	Nintendo Switch 2	Nintendo	Monolith Soft Kyoto	

== Philosophy ==
From the company's inception, Takahashi and Sugiura wanted to give creative freedom to pursue projects outside genre standards, in addition to hiring young staff. An early aim was to encourage younger developers to make their mark in the industry, which at the time was dominated by people in the late 30s and up. This outlook was the reason why younger staff were given charge of the Xenosaga series. Kojima stated that younger developers were preferred as they could bring interesting ideas to a project. According to Sugiura, a major element during the period in which Monolith Soft was under Namco was the focus on creativity. They wanted to balance this with the financial logistics of game design rather than having budgetary concerns stifle the creative flare of the staff. When talking about their Wii U projects in 2012, Monolith Soft staff member Michihiko Inaba stated that the company wanted to show that Japan could keep up with the Western market in terms of ambitious games that pushed the industry forward, comparing Monolith Soft to Bethesda Softworks in this desire.

Speaking about the move from Namco Bandai to Nintendo, Sugiura commented that it was a challenge to only be developing games for a single group of consoles. Nintendo endorsed the challenge to Monolith Soft with incentives such as making a particular game within given hardware specifications, providing the company time and resources to accomplish that. Another factor that changed within Monolith Soft's development process was Nintendo's increased quality control, which would moot any project that did not have the desired quality for their systems. This sense of challenge was also echoed by Takahashi, who described both Xenoblade Chronicles and Xenoblade Chronicles X as being defined by self-imposed challenges to the development team when creating the environments on limited gaming hardware. Monolith Soft's scope and goals are often attributed to Takahashi's drive and ambition. While commonly associated with Japanese role-playing games (JRPGs), Monolith Soft focuses more on making role-playing games for a worldwide audience.

Rather than a fixed development structure, Monolith Soft chooses to freely assign staff based on the direction a project takes, in addition to believing in collaborations with other companies on projects rather than developing entirely in-house. According to a 2012 interview with Takahashi, a prerequisite for working at Monolith Soft is a deep passion for games in addition to general knowledge outside the field. As opposed to many other Japanese and Western studios which have come under criticism for excessive overtime and poor working conditions, Monolith Soft strives for a friendly working environment and reasonable hours for its staff. Overtime is also negotiated with the management and receives payment, a rarity in Japanese business. Speaking in relation to this approach, Honne recited the company's motto; "Zero overtime and creative work allowed". Despite the gaming industry's workforce being dominated by men, Monolith Soft has a notably high proportion of female developers working at the company, with more than a quarter of its workforce in total.
