= Xenoblade Chronicles X =

2015 video game

- International cover art
- Developer: Monolith Soft (Note: Additional work, development support, and produced by Nintendo Software Planning & Development. The Nintendo Switch and Nintendo Switch 2 enhanced versions, titled Xenoblade Chronicles X: Definitive Edition, Additional work, development support, and produced by Nintendo Entertainment Planning & Development.)
- Publisher: Nintendo
- Directors: Koh Kojima; Genki Yokota
- Producers: Shingo Kawabata; Hitoshi Yamagami
- Designer: Koh Kojima
- Programmer: Toshiaki Yajima
- Artists: Norihiro Takami; Kunihiko Tanaka; Koichi Mugitani; Takayuki Yanase
- Writers: Yuichiro Takeda; Kazuho Hyodo; Mamoru Ohta; Tetsuya Takahashi
- Composer: Hiroyuki Sawano
- Series: Xenoblade
- Platforms: Wii U; Nintendo Switch; Nintendo Switch 2
- Release: Wii U: JP: April 29, 2015; NA/EU: December 4, 2015; AU: December 5, 2015; Nintendo Switch: WW: March 20, 2025; Nintendo Switch 2: WW: February 19, 2026
- Genre: Action role-playing
- Modes: Single-player, multiplayer

Xenoblade Chronicles X (Note: Known in Japan as Xenoblade X (Japanese: ゼノブレイドクロス, Hepburn: Zenobureido Kurosu; stylized as XenobladeX, pronounced "Xenoblade Cross")) is a 2015 action role-playing game developed by Monolith Soft and published by Nintendo for the Wii U. The game is part of the Xenoblade series, itself forming part of the wider Xeno metaseries. Carrying over several gameplay elements from the original game, players explore the open world planet Mira, completing a variety of quests and unlocking new regions to explore and gather resources from across its five continents. The story follows a surviving human ship after escaping an alien battle which destroys Earth, with the player character joining the BLADE unit to defend the human survivors and uncover Mira's secrets.

Production began in 2010 after work finished on Xenoblade Chronicles. Returning staff included series creator Tetsuya Takahashi as executive director and co-writer, director and designer Koh Kojima, and co-writer Yuichiro Takeda. Xenosaga artists Kunihiko Tanaka and Kouichi Mugitani contributed to the art and character design. The team set themselves the challenge of creating an expansive world for players to explore despite a tight development budget. The implementation of online multiplayer both proved challenging due to the team's inexperience, and required a comprehensive story rewrite to recast the protagonist as a player-created avatar. The music was created by anime composer Hiroyuki Sawano.

Xenoblade Chronicles X was first announced in 2013 under the working title "X". It was set to release in 2014; however, its release was later delayed to 2015. The game's localization was handled by Nintendo Treehouse and 8-4, undergoing changes for its Western release. Upon release, Xenoblade Chronicles X was praised for its combat and world design, but saw criticism for its narrative and lack of explanation for its systems. Journalists have also ranked it among the best releases on the Wii U. The game engine and foundation work of Xenoblade Chronicles X was used in the team's next Xeno game, Xenoblade Chronicles 2.

An expanded remaster, Xenoblade Chronicles X: Definitive Edition, was released in 2025 for the Nintendo Switch. The remaster included gameplay and interface adjustments, new story content and characters, and graphical enhancements. It met with positive reviews from journalists, with praise going to its gameplay and visual enhancements, though there were mixed opinions on its new story content. A Nintendo Switch 2 edition of the remaster was released in February 2026.

== Gameplay ==
Xenoblade Chronicles X tasks the player-created avatar with exploring Mira and fighting its indigenous life; the battle system relies on command-based actions which trigger both attack types and battle interactions with the rest of the party.

Xenoblade Chronicles X is an action role-playing video game in which the player controls a customizable avatar; they can adjust the avatar's gender, facial features, build, and voice. Working from the home hub of New Los Angeles (NLA), the avatar explores the five continents of the open world planet Mira alongside a party of companions. Quests are divided into story quests that advance the main narrative, affinity quests which strengthen bonds between the avatar and their comrades, small-scale missions which reward in-game money and additional features, and side quests taken from NLA's citizens. Accessible quests are limited based on the amount of Mira explored, which is tied to the main story's completion percentage. Completing quests and fighting enemies grants the character several types of experience points (EXP); standard EXP raises a character's general statistics, while Class EXP raises a character's assigned Class.

The avatar can adopt different roles within BLADE, each of which grants different advantages; Pathfinders open up new locations, Interceptors defend research teams from hostile lifeforms, Harriers actively seek hostile lifeforms, including powerful monsters called Tyrants; Reclaimers retrieve wreckage from the White Whale, Curators explore new locations and collect data for BLADE, Prospectors collect rare resources, Outfitters develop gear, and Mediators resolve conflicts among NLA's people. The avatar initially explores Mira on foot, but gains access to the transformable Skell mechs during the later half of the game after completing a specific set of quests. (Note: Called Dolls (ドールス, Dōrusu) in the Japanese version.) Skells initially come with a bipedal walking mode and a vehicle-form driving mode. Each Skell has a limited amount of fuel, and when depleted, it cannot be used until the fuel is replenished. Skells are kept at a special hangar in NLA, where they can be customized and fitted with new weapons or loaned to another party member. There are three Skell types, with increasing armor quality and fuel levels, allowing further travel and greater battle efficiency. Skells have "Insurance", used to repair and maintain the Skells. Multiple Skell models can be bought and upgraded over the course of the game.

Aside from standard enemies from among the game's antagonistic force, the party can also battle Mira's indigenous wildlife. While some creatures are docile until attacked, others will attack if they hear or see the player. Upon entering battle, each character attacks with their assigned automatically to a set rhythm based on their assigned weapons; each character has health points (HP) and Tension points (TP), and a morale gauge which determines their effectiveness in battle. Attack strength varies depending on a party member's position upon attacking. Healing the party in-battle can be done with types of Arts, but is mainly done using a quick-time event (QTE) tied to the Soul Voice system, a line-up of commands which trigger a Soul Challenge QTE, healing the party or granting positive effects. Successfully completing a Soul Challenge raises the party's morale. If a battle is successfully completed, knocked-out party members will revive and the party will recover HP. If the avatar is knocked out, they can either teleport to a safe location or be revived if the other party members defeated all engaged enemies within thirty seconds.

The party consists of the avatar and up to three party members controlled by artificial intelligence. Each character has a melee weapon, a ranged weapon, and a selection of abilities called Arts. After raising a character's level from gaining EXP, new Arts are unlocked, with Class-based Arts unlocking upon raising a Class' rank. EXP portions can also be used to strengthen Arts. Arts have different abilities, ranging from standard or powerful attacks, supporting the party, and inflicting or lifting status ailments. Once used, each Art has a cool-down timer, taking a variable amount of time depending on the Art used. A secondary cool-down timer activates when the ability becomes available, triggering additional effects if the timer is allowed to refill. TP rise with each normal attack, and are used to trigger special Arts ranging from powerful attacks to reviving fallen allies. When their TP meter is high enough, a character enters "Overdrive", which increases attack power and decreases cool-down time. Skell battle mechanics are identical to those of the avatar and party, with additional abilities including raising the defense of party members not equipped with Skells. If the Skell is defeated, it is evacuated to NLA for repair, with the status of both party and Skell determined by a final QTE triggered at the end of an unsuccessful battle, with a perfect trigger resulting in additional status buffs to the party.

In addition to the single-player campaign, Xenoblade Chronicles X features a multiplayer element. After connecting online, players can loan their avatars for other player's parties in their games, forming units dubbed Squads. These Squads can be up to 32-players strong, enabling the sharing of reports and active participation in battles in other player's worlds. Squads can take part in "Tasks", time-limited random missions where players collect a set number of resources from Mira's environment. Completing Tasks is rewarded with items and equipment. Some multi-player missions pit parties against a Global Nemesis, an exceptionally powerful monster. Fast travel options are unlocked when new areas are discovered, accessed through both special red seats in the environment and BLADE outposts.

In the original release, functions related to mapping Mira, fast travel points, adjusting character equipment and messages related to single-player and multi-player components were handled through the Wii U GamePad. The game is also compatible with the console's Off TV Play function. The 2025-released Definitive Edition includes a number of gameplay adjustments and alterations. Elements of combat are streamlined to require fewer inputs, there are improved quest guidance options, the level cap is raised, Wii U Gamepad-specific functions are incorporated into the game itself, party members can be changed at any time outside battle, and party members outside combat will still gain experience.

== Synopsis ==
=== Setting and characters ===
Xenoblade Chronicles X is unconnected to any previous game in the Xeno metaseries, although there are thematic and aesthetic references. After Earth is caught in the crossfire of an alien war, humanity escapes on spaceships — only a few ships make it off the planet, one of them being the White Whale, containing the city New Los Angeles (NLA). The game takes place on Mira, an uncharted world far away from Earth where the White Whale crash-lands: NLA becomes the center of human activity and commerce. Mira is divided into five continents — Primordia, which has the most Earth-like environment; Noctilum, covered by forests and filled with bioluminescent lifeforms; Oblivia, dominated by desert and ancient ruins; Sylvalum, a pale landscape clouded in mist and dominated by large plants and rock formations; and Cauldros, a volcanic land controlled by the Ganglion, the aliens responsible for Earth's destruction.

The main character is a player-created avatar whose body type, appearance, and voice can be chosen from a variety of options. The avatar becomes a member of BLADE (Builders of the Legacy After the Destruction of Earth). Joining the avatar on their missions is Elma, the leader of BLADE and Colonel of NLA's Skell forces; Lin Lee Koo, BLADE's engineer and a girl genius who created and maintains NLA's Skell mechs; and Lao Huang, a former US Army officer with a cool manner.

=== Plot ===
In the year 2054, to escape the impending destructive crossfire between two warring alien races, humanity evacuates Earth aboard interstellar arks, with only few escaping the destruction, including the White Whale. After traveling for two years, the White Whale is attacked by forces of one of the races who caused Earth's destruction and subsequently transported to Mira. During the crash-landing, the Lifehold—a device containing the majority of the human colonists—is separated from the White Whale, with lifepods containing colonists being scattered across Mira. The avatar is awoken from a lifepod by Elma and brought back to New Los Angeles. While suffering from amnesia, the avatar joins BLADE, working with Elma and Lin to recover more lifepods and search for the Lifehold. During their missions across Mira, BLADE encounters multiple alien races, learning that those attacking them are part of the Ganglion coalition, an alliance of races led by the Ganglion race, who are intent on destroying humanity.

During one mission, the avatar is wounded, revealing their body is robotic. All the people of NLA are in robot bodies called Mimeosomes, with their true bodies held within the Lifehold. The Lifehold's internal power is depleting, meaning the Mimeosomes will eventually shut down, killing the human population. BLADE fight off multiple attempts to destroy the White Whale and the Lifehold, eventually dissolving the alliance between the Ganglion and their allies. Due to his bitterness against NLA's leaders for abandoning his family on Earth, Lao attempts to betray the White Whale to the Ganglion. Lin stops Elma from executing him, and Lao is persuaded to give them the information needed to find the Lifehold. Other missions reveal that humanity are descended from the Samaarians, an other-dimensional alien race who originally founded the Samaar Federation that was the other faction that caused Earth's destruction, and once controlled the Ganglion.

Within the Lifehold, BLADE discovers a pool of genetic material for recreating Earth's lifeforms and restoring humanity. Elma explains their human bodies were destroyed with Earth, but their consciousnesses are preserved in the Lifehold for transfer into new bodies. Due to the plan's questionable ethics, this was kept secret from the general population. The Ganglion's leader Luxaar attacks the group, until Lao attacks from behind, making the two fall into the genetic material, where they merge into a monster that BLADE is forced to kill. Before dying, Lao reveals from Luxaar's memories that humanity's Samaarian-based DNA can destroy the Ganglion using a genetic failsafe. Though Lao dies, Elma assures the group the Lifehold can revive him. With the Lifehold power restored, Elma deactivates her Mimeosome and reveals her true form as an alien. A narration by Lin reveals that Elma visited Earth thirty years before the Ganglion arrived, giving humanity their means of escape. In a post-credits scene, a team led by Elma discover that the Lifehold's databases containing humanity's memories were destroyed upon impact with Mira. Elma speculates that Mira is somehow preserving humanity. Lao is then seen unconscious on a beach, waking when approached by a cloaked figure.

In the Definitive Edition story, Mira starts being consumed by a spreading phenomenon accompanied by Ghosts, the alien beings who fought the Samaar Federation and Ganglion and destroyed Earth and Elma's homeworld. Two key figures surrounding the White Whale's escape also reappear; Alois "Al" Bernholt, presumed-dead pilot of the alien Skell unit Ares and Elma's former partner; and Void, creator and leader of the Ganglion. As surviving Ganglion join Void, Elma and Alois gradually reveal the full truth. Elma was from another dimension, and her people's Samaarian heritage prompted Void's attack, triggering the Ghosts to appear and destroy first her dimension, then the dimension of Earth; Mira exists in a further dimension. Alois survived in the Ares by entering an interdimensional realm, seeing glimpses of other universes and communicating with Lao's spirit before he passed on. He believes humanity can jump into a new universe to escape the Ghosts and Ganglion. Alois further believes that a "universal mechanism" tied to the interdimensional realm preserved humanity in their Mimeosome forms.

A new ship dubbed White Whale 2 is created so humanity, allied aliens, and Mira's genetic data can escape. During their missions, Void steals the Ares's cores, which are needed together with Alois' still-organic body to power the dimensional jump. A team led by the avatar and including Elma, Lin and Alois go to retrieve the Ares cores from his continent base Volitaris. Upon confronting Void, Alois is briefly absorbed into him, learning that he is a former Samaarian scientist who used an ancient artifact dubbed the Conduit to create the Ares, (Note: Implied to be the same artifact present in the other Xenoblade games.) which caused the Ghosts to manifest; he was imprisoned within Volitaris, eventually becoming disillusioned with existence and longing to experience death using the Ganglion, triggering the prolonged war with the Ghosts. The avatar retrieves the Ares cores, using them to tap into the wills of the dead from all dimensions, and destroys Void. White Whale 2 successfully jumps to a new dimension, and the game ends as it approaches a new world.

== Development ==
Xenoblade Chronicles X was developed by Monolith Soft, with company founder Tetsuya Takahashi forming the original concept and serving as the game's executive director. Production was supported by Nintendo Software Planning & Development. Following the completion of Xenoblade Chronicles for the Wii in 2010, Takahashi approached Nintendo producer Hitoshi Yamagami and asked if he could develop a new science fiction-themed role-playing game built upon the systems of Xenoblade Chronicles. Yamagami and Nintendo were willing, and talks turned towards what Takahashi and Monolith Soft could do on Nintendo's upcoming Wii U console. Xenoblade Chronicles directors Genki Yokota of Nintendo and Koh Kojima of Monolith Soft returning in their original roles. The producers were Shingo Kawabata of Monolith Soft and Hitoshi Yamagami of Nintendo. Discussions about how to realize Xenoblade Chronicles X went on for around six months. While planned for release early in the Wii U's life cycle, the planned release date was pushed back due to development issues. They later commented that it was a challenge fitting the entire game onto a single Wii U game disc, with Kawabata commenting that the game "barely fits" onto the 32 gigabyte disc. Xenoblade Chronicles X was Monolith Soft's first high-definition video game. To help cope with this first, the team decided against using cutting-edge technology. The team used the lessons and experience from their time developing Xenoblade Chronicles, in addition to setting limits upon what they did during production; a specified self-imposed limitation was not using middleware to speed up the production process.

The battle system was based upon the basic mechanics of that used in Xenoblade Chronicles, but with an increased sense of speed to make it feel more like an action game. Takahashi described creating the battle system one of the main challenges of development. The complete removal of "healer" classes from the system was because Takahashi felt people quickly grew tired of this role, which partly served as inspiration for the command-based "Soul Voice" system. Another goal for Takahashi was to encourage active criticism from players that he could use to improve his later work, as it felt he had received too little criticism for Xenoblade Chronicles. While many role-playing games tried to be accessible, Xenoblade Chronicles X was tailored towards the hardcore players of the genre, while also presenting the many layers of information to players an understandable and manageable way. The online functionality initially used very "basic" technology due to the team's inexperience with high-definition and online development, but with development help from Nintendo the current online multiplayer structure was created. The multiplayer segments also helped counteract the feeling of isolation players would experience exploring the game's world. The online functions were only incorporated halfway through development. The team focused on making the online mode "loosely connected" so that players can feel the presence of others. However, due to the game's role-playing elements, they also consciously made it for players to focus on playing alone without any disruption.

=== Design ===
Creating Mira was the first priority when full development on the game began, mirroring the design of Xenoblade Chronicles. The team initially envisioned the story taking place over several different planets, but this was discarded as stretching out the possible content over several worlds would limit the experience for players. After evaluating their content plans, they settled on a single planet with five continents. Creating an open world game was part of the team's goal when designing the game. A key part of creating Mira's continents was using a limited number of assets to create varied environments. When conceiving the game structure, Takahashi drew inspiration from role-playing games from Europe and North America. When designing the open world structure, the team did not install the entire space on the hard disk as the Wii U did not allow for direct installation, instead tuning the open world so it ran smoothly without installing. The game used an extensive library of sound effects, for which the team brought in external company Sound Racer, who had worked on multiple video game franchises including Xenosaga and Final Fantasy. Sound effect work was produced by Shojiro Nakaoka.

The game map was an estimated five times larger than that of Xenoblade Chronicles, which proved problematic especially during the debugging phase. The open world was proving so problematic that at one point the team were considering scrapping it completely. The hexagonal map structure, with unlockable information points, was designed to solve the problem of players making their way through large fields. The restrictive nature of the main story quests was designed so players could be eased into the expansive nature of Mira. The choice of Los Angeles as the model for the game's hub city was inspired by Takahashi's liking for the city; his initial idea of modelling the hub after New York City was scrapped due to budgetary constraints in creating the necessary tall buildings. Creating the environment of NLA proved problematic due to the console's memory limitations, and the team worked especially hard on decreasing load times and ensuring collision detection worked properly.

The artwork and character designs for the game was worked on by a number of different artists. The avatar templates and main cast were created by Kunihiko Tanaka, the main artist for the Xenosaga games. Tanaka was brought on board to bring out the Xeno elements of the game. A core part of the art team was Kouichi Mugitani, who provided character illustrations for Xenosaga Episode III and worked as production designer for all three Xenosaga titles. Allied mecha designs were handled by Takayuki Yanase, who had previously worked on the anime Ghost in the Shell: Arise and Mobile Suit Gundam 00, along with the video game Metal Gear Rising: Revengeance. Enemy mechs were designed by Yasushi Suzuki, who had previously worked on Sin and Punishment and its sequel Star Successor. Alien NPC characters were designed by Raita Kazama, who also helped design Mira's fauna. Yoko Tsukamoto, an artist for Lord of Vermilion and Xenoblade Chronicles, was brought in to add fantasy elements to the world, while additional designs for enemies native to Mira were created by Takashi Kojo. Weapons were designed by Hideyuki Matsumoto, who had worked on both the Xenosaga and Front Mission series. Background art design was outsourced to Kusanagi, a company whose previous art-based work included Ni no Kuni: Dominion of the Dark Djinn. The large number of artists ensured diversity among the alien races. The game's art director was Norihiro Takami.

Creating the large flora and fauna of Mira was difficult as the team required both passive and combat situations for them. While designing each creature and race to be alien to lifeforms from Earth, they also wanted to create familiar silhouettes so they would appear "familiar and exotic at the same time in a way that [is] unsettling". The human armor designs and the alien Wrothian race drew inspiration from samurai and their armor. The concept for the Skell mechs was a machine switching between a humanoid and vehicular form. Their designs consciously drew influence from the Gundam franchise. The size of the Skells (between nine and ten meters high in-game) was calculated as the best human-to-robot size ratio when taking the game's combat scenarios into account. The Skells were an intentional callback to the mechs featured in Takahashi's first Xeno title Xenogears, with the mechanics present in Xenoblade Chronicle X echoing scrapped gameplay ideas from Xenogears. Another design callback featured in the game were the Lifehold pods, shaped similarly to monolith objects from earlier Xeno titles.

=== Scenario ===
Takahashi created most of the main scenario himself, working on the script alongside Xenoblade Chronicles co-writer Yuichiro Takeda and Gundam series writer Kazuho Hyodo. Takahashi and Takeda decided they could not write the entire story, estimated at the time as substantially larger than Xenoblade Chronicles. On advice from Takeda, he brought in Hyodo. Due to Hyodo's extensive involvement in science fiction stories, Takahashi felt confident leaving much of the work to him. The choice of a science fiction setting was influenced by Takahashi's wish to do something different from the fantasy setting of Xenoblade Chronicles. Xenoblade Chronicles X was the first time Hyodo had worked on a video game. One of the main goals for Takahashi was having humans and the robot Skells coexisting and functioning in the world. Due to the scale and experimental nature of the game, the Monolith Soft team made an effort to move away from the philosophical storylines their company had become known for with previous titles. Speaking about his goals for the game, Takahashi felt that he had finally created what he had wanted to since first founding Monolith Soft in 1999.

After foundation work had been completed for Mira, the main focus turned towards creating the game's scenario. From there, Takahashi and Kojima had several meetings about the story with Takeda, Hyodo and Yokota. Takahashi had already written a large amount of the plot beforehand, with its size being compared to a novel by Kojima. Hyodo was commented as creating a number of young female characters with important story roles, contrasting Takeda's preference for middle-aged male characters. Takeda carefully picked out the stories that fit with the game's content and scale and turned them into scripts. As Hyodo wrote several quest scenarios, he was approved by the staff members to create additional characters for them. According to Takeda, the scenario including the main story and quests took about a year and a half to write. For the cast, the team gathered what they described as an "exceptional" voice cast, who were highly professional during recording despite the high work load of recording the lengthy script. The team felt the game should continue the tradition from Xenoblade Chronicles of having characters talk during battle as it made the original game stand out. Compared to 3,000 battle lines from the original, the number of battle dialogues increased to 11,000 lines for this game; Kojima thought that it was a misprint when he first saw the word count. The total voice work was four times that of Xenoblade Chronicles, resulting in some of the actors losing their voices during recording of battle lines.

The scenario initially had a set main character with their own narrative, but midway through development the online mode was introduced, and the team decided to rework the story to accommodate a player-created avatar. Takeda said it was a challenge to adjust the story from a pre-defined protagonist to avatars as the main character, which drastically changed the flow of the story. The changes resulted in several proposed characters, including the original lead and a proposed villain dubbed the "Black Knight" being cut; the Black Knight made a minor cameo in the final game during the post-credits ending. The game's title had multiple meanings, which varied between regions. Despite carrying the "Xenoblade" title, Xenoblade Chronicles X was not a sequel, but instead a spiritual successor carrying over the basic themes of the original Xenoblade Chronicles. For this reason, it was not titled as a numerical sequel. The "X" designation stands for "cross" in the Japanese release, which stood for both the meeting of different races in the game's story and the interaction of players online during gameplay. For the English version, the "X" symbol stood for the unknown, and also represented alien life and the unknown planet of Mira, in addition to the interaction in battle between humans and the Skells.

=== Music ===
The game's soundtrack was handled by Hiroyuki Sawano. Known for his work on anime soundtracks including Attack on Titan and Kill la Kill, Sawano was brought on by Takahashi, who was a longtime fan. When they first met, Takahashi showed Sawano a concept video for the game, which provided the inspiration for Sawano's subsequent work. Sawano created the music based on the musical selections and resources provided by Monolith Soft staff, before working on the music in his own studio. Once he had finished work on the theme demos, Sawano created the score for orchestra and band. He created the broader orchestral elements on his computer, adding the smaller layers and elements himself so he had complete control over how the score evolved. To help with this, he went to a music copyist and had them create scores for each individual instrument. After creating the main theme and the core musical themes, he then moved on to the rest of the soundtrack—estimated at over ninety tracks—over three different periods during production. Due to Takahashi's liking for Sawano's music, Sawano had the freedom to stick to his musical style. The score was directed and co-produced by Legendoor's Yasushi Horiguchi, who was brought on board the project alongside Sawano.

While Xenoblade Chronicles featured only one vocal theme, Xenoblade Chronicles X featured enough that it was considered rather high for genre standards. During early discussions about the game's music, Sawano and Takahashi thought it would be fun to include a large number of vocal themes. Sawano brought in several vocalists to create these tracks. The vocalists included rapper David Whitaker, singers Mika Kobayashi, Yumiko Inoue, Aimee Blackschleger, Cyua, mpi, and Sayulee. The ending theme, "Your Voice", was sung by Kobayashi. The lyrics for all vocal tracks were written by Whitaker, mpi and Rie. They had all worked with Sawano on previous projects. Sawano said that Xenoblade Chronicles X had the highest number of vocal tracks of any project to date.

An official soundtrack album, Xenoblade X Original Soundtrack, was released on May 20, 2015. It was published by Defstar Records and distributed by Sony Music Entertainment Japan. The game's music was arranged into 55 tracks. The album received mixed reviews from music critics.

== Release ==
Nintendo confirmed in 2012 that Monolith Soft was developing a new title for the Wii U. The game was officially announced in a Nintendo Direct in January 2013 under the working title "X". At E3 2013, it was announced that it was scheduled for a 2014 release. The game's official title and updated release window of 2015 was announced at E3 2014. In an interview following the game's Japanese release, Kojima expressed sorrow at the amount of work the game had provided for Mario Club, Nintendo's in-house testing group. Then-CEO Satoru Iwata commented that he froze for a moment when he first saw the group's testing fee for the game.

By November 2014, the game was entering the final stages of production. While Nintendo had decided not to create an official website at that point, Monolith Soft decided to create their own website for the game. While they initially thought Nintendo would object, they were allowed to go ahead with creating and maintaining the website. Monolith Soft also created an official Twitter account for the game alongside the new website. Xenoblade Chronicles X was published in Japan by Nintendo on April 29, 2015. The Japanese version came with standard and a hardware bundle featuring a version of the game with a reversible cover, black Wii U console and gamepad, and an artbook. Alongside the game's release, downloadable content (DLC) was made available for purchase, featuring four new characters with accompanying stories split between three quests, and optional data packs to speed loading times. The data packs were provided so that when flying Skells portions of the world could be loaded from storage to make for a smoother playing experience.

=== Localization ===
A worldwide release for Xenoblade Chronicles X was confirmed at E3 2013. Its Western release dates were announced at E3 2015, the month following its Japanese release. In contrast to other prominent Wii U titles Nintendo had scheduled for that year, Xenoblade Chronicles X was not prominently advertised. This was due to the game having an established audience among both role-playing fans in general and fans of the Xeno series. Xenoblade Chronicles X was released in North America and Europe on 4 December 2015. In Australia and New Zealand, the game was released on 5 December. The additional characters released as paid DLC in Japan were released as part of the game in the West. Following its release, Xenoblade Chronicles X received software updates via download: the first was minor adjustments to in-game text, while the second added Spanish and French subtitles.

The Western localization was handled collaboratively by Nintendo Treehouse and 8-4, a company whose previous localization credits include Fire Emblem Awakening and Tales of Vesperia. Due to the substantial size of the game and its voice acting, localization proved challenging for Nintendo. As with the Japanese version, external studio Sound Racer worked on the sound environment. For its Western release, the game received multiple changes; the mech's names were changed from "Dolls" to "Skells", a character customization slider for altering breast size of female avatars was completely removed, and character Lin's bikini outfit was removed. In an interview, Lin's voice actress Cassandra Lee Morris said that Lin was given an older voice compared to her Japanese counterpart as the team felt a young-sounding voice would grate on players over the course of the game. In the wake of fan criticism following the game's release, both Morris and Takahashi defended the changes as necessary parts of the localization process.

=== Definitive Edition ===
In 2018, Takahashi stated that he wanted to bring the game to Nintendo Switch, but cited difficulties with both funding and its scale. In October 2024, Nintendo announced a remaster of the game for the Switch, being released worldwide on March 20, 2025, titled Xenoblade Chronicles X: Definitive Edition. The remaster, which is based on the Western version incorporating the DLC, includes remastered graphics, a continuation of the original narrative, a new area related to that, and two new companion characters. Sawano returned to co-compose new music with anime composer Misaki Umase. On February 19, 2026, a Nintendo Switch 2 Edition of the game was digitally released, with an upgrade available to existing owners for a small fee, which upgrades the graphics to support 4K visuals and a 60 FPS framerate. A physical version for Nintendo Switch 2 was released on April 16, 2026.

== Reception ==
Reception

Aggregate scores
Aggregator	Score		
Aggregator	NS	NS2	Wii U
Metacritic	87/100	79/100	84/100
OpenCritic	97%		88%

Review scores
Publication	Score		
Publication	NS	NS2	Wii U
Destructoid			9/10
Electronic Gaming Monthly			7.5/10
Eurogamer	4/5		Essential
Famitsu			34/40
Game Informer			7.25/10
GameSpot			8/10
GamesRadar+			3.5/5
IGN	9/10		8.2/10
Nintendo Life	10/10		9/10
Nintendo World Report			9.5/10
Polygon			7/10
RPGamer			4.5/5
VentureBeat			90/100
Video Games Chronicle	4/5		

Xenoblade Chronicles X saw generally positive reviews, earning an aggregated review score of 84/100 at Metacritic. Donald Theriault of Nintendo World Report enjoyed the storyline and plot twists, giving special praise to the affinity missions and localization. Matt Miller of Game Informer enjoyed the scale and tension of opening missions, Thomas Whitehead of Nintendo Life found the narrative both nuanced and deep. Eurogamer's Simon Parkin praised the writing and overall pacing, while Alex Fuller of RPGamer noted the worldbuilding done through the side quests and environments. Japanese gaming magazine Famitsu noted pacing issues, and Destructoid's Chris Carter described the story as "serviceable, yet sometimes drawn-out". Jose Otero of IGN enjoyed the premise and positively compared its structure to an anime, but faulted the presentation and felt the dialogue "fell flat". GameSpot's Peter Brown felt the main story was mostly forgettable, an opinion shared by David Roberts of GamesRadar+ while praising the side quest stories. Polygon's Philip Kollar faulted the characters as shallow and lacking engaging personalities to balance the silent protagonist. Heidi Kemps, writing for VentureBeat, noted that the story became interesting but was impeded by slow initial pacing. Jeff Landa of Electronic Gaming Monthly was fairly negative about the story and characters, faulting the lack of a compelling narrative or the Xeno series' previous philosophical elements.

Parkin praised the varied visuals found across the in-game world, while Fuller lauded the visual design as "excellent throughout". Otero noted the cinematic cutscenes, but felt most story scenes were boring to watch, and felt the music "just sounds like noise". While Miller praised the voice acting and felt the graphics were among the console's best, but disliked the soundtrack. In direct contrast, Whitehead was mixed on the voice acting but praised the science fiction tone of the music. Theriault lauded its technical performance, and praised the soundtrack despite noting it did not match the original game's variety. Carter echoed the praise of the game's technical performance. Brown praised the creature designs while describing the music as "dotted with low-rent tracks that make you reach for the mute button."

Brown was overall positive, praising the combat design and the focus on exploration of the large world. Carter lauded the expansive world design as fun to explore, and noted the combat system was entertaining and challenging. Landa lauded the diversity of the game's enemies and the scope of its world, though he felt its complex design would intimidate players. Parkin enjoyed the lack of direct explanation in the world's design and the challenges he ran into as a consequence. The Famitsu reviewers mostly enjoyed the world design, though one reviewer felt the world was too large for comfortable exploration. Kollar noted difficulty spikes, but otherwise praised the combat system and exploration. Miller praised the overall gameplay and exploration, but noted its pacing became poor in later areas. Otero praised the combat and explorations as the best and most engaging parts, additionally praising the class system and Skells despite the long quest to unlock them. Roberts disliked elements of the quest design, but gave praise to the depth of systems. Both Theriault and Whitehead shared praise of the expansive world design, depth of combat systems, and the incorporation of Skells. Fuller generally enjoyed exploration and combat, and Kemps gave praise to the open exploration and the customization options in the class system. A recurring complaint from reviewers was a lack of explanation with the combat and other mechanics that were already complex.

The Definitive Edition release also met with generally positive reviews, earning an aggregated review score of 87/100 at Metacritic. PJ O'Reilly of Nintendo Life−giving the game a perfect score−lauded the changes as improving and enhancing already-great gameplay and world design, and recommended it to both new and returning players. In an online Famitsu review, writer Nishikawa praised the gameplay additions and graphical upgrades, saying it was a perfect starting point for the Xenoblade series, but found the story dull. IGN's George Yang felt that the Definitive Edition enhancements increased the overall quality of the game, cutting down on the original release's tedious elements. Catherine Castle of Eurogamer described the game as a solid experience on its own, with the gameplay and technical enhancements improving it further for new players despite the weakness of its story. Chris Scullion, writing for Video Game Chronicle, was unimpressed by most of the graphical and story additions, but felt the gameplay was solid and enjoyable enough to recommend it to new players. Opinions on the new story content were mixed; O'Reilly and Yang were generally positive about it, while Nishikawa, Castle and Scullion felt it overlengthened the game or did not add anything new.

=== Sales and accolades ===
The game was the third best-selling game during its release week in Japan, selling around 85,000 copies. During its second week and third week, it sold over 11,000 and 2,000 copies respectively. By the end of the year, the game had sold over 114,600 units in Japan. Upon its release in the United Kingdom, the game managed to secure 28th place in the charts. Despite its modest position, the game's launch sales was 73% higher than its predecessor had been in the same region. In the United States, the game sold over 200,000 physical copies during the month of December, nearly doubling the game's then-lifetime sales in Japan.

At the 2015 NAVGTR Awards, it received nominations in the "Game, Franchise Role-Playing" "Performance in a Comedy, Supporting" categories, the latter for Chris Cason's performance as Tatsu. The game was also nominated for Best RPG at The Game Awards 2016. Several journalists for websites including IGN, Polygon, Eurogamer, RPGFan, Digital Trends and Video Games Chronicle, ranked the game as both one of the better and rarer titles for the Wii U console.

== Legacy ==
The foundation work for Xenoblade Chronicles X provided a base architecture upon which the staff were able to build for the next Xeno game for the Switch, resulting in a far shorter development time than the previous Xenoblade titles. The next game, titled Xenoblade Chronicles 2 and released worldwide on December 1, 2017, acts as a thematic sequel to Xenoblade Chronicles, shifting back to a story-driven approach after the focus on gameplay for Xenoblade Chronicles X. Elma was released as a recruitable "Blade" for the expansion pass of Xenoblade Chronicles 2. Both Kojima and Takahashi have voiced their wish and willingness to develop a sequel to Xenoblade Chronicles X.
