= Masashi Ebara =

Japanese actor (born 1953)

- 江原 正士
- Born: Masashi Ehara; May 4, 1953 (age 73); Kanagawa Prefecture, Japan
- Occupations: Actor; voice actor; narrator
- Years active: 1973–present
- Agent: Aoni Production

Masashi Ehara (江原 正士, Ehara Masashi; born May 4, 1953), better known as Masashi Ebara (江原 正士, Ebara Masashi), is a Japanese actor, voice actor and narrator from Kanagawa Prefecture. He is affiliated with Aoni Production.

He had roles in the Initial D series (as Jōshima Toshiya "God Hand"), Naruto (as Might Guy), Eat-Man (as Bolt Crank), the Shakugan no Shana series (as Alastor the Flame of Heavens), Bakusō Kyōdai Let's & Go!! (as Doctor Tsuchiya), Buso Renkin (as Captain Bravo), The Transformers (as Ratchet) and Final Fantasy XIII (as Sazh Katzroy). He is also the official dub-over artist of Tom Hanks, Bill Murray, Wesley Snipes, Bruce Campbell and Robin Williams. He was also the first dubbing voice actor of Andy García and Alec Baldwin in their early days. Much of his roles are occupied by Koichi Yamadera in different editions of the films.

== Background ==
Ebara graduated from Tōkyōtoritsu Chitosegaoka Senior High School. He initially did not aspire to be an actor, but he chose to attend the Toho Performing Arts Academy to learn the trade because he admired the work of Charlie Chaplin as a student. After previously working with Gekidan Subaru, he affiliated himself with 81 Produce, but he is now affiliated with Aoni Production.

== Filmography ==
=== Television animation ===
Year	Title	Role	Notes
1987	Transformers: The Headmasters	Spike Witwicky, Scattershot/Computron, Pounce	
1990	Robin Hood no Daibōken	Baron Alwyn	
1991	Soreike! Anpanman	Unadonman, Pineappleman, Princess Dorian, Crayonman	
1992	O~i! Ryoma	Yamauchi Yōdō	
1992	The Laughing Salesman	Kenzō Warii (episode 93), Shokudō no Oyaji (December 26, 1992 special)	
1993	Nintama Rantarō	Young Ryūōmaru, Heishirō Kusai	
1994	Pretty Soldier Sailor Moon R	Chiral	
1994	Yu Yu Hakusho	Yomi	
1996	Baketsu de Gohan	Zubrofsky	
1996	Bakusō Kyōdai Let's & Go!!	Doctor Tsuchiya	
1996	Raideen the Superior	Kraken	
1997	Eat-Man	Bolt Crank	
1998	Eat-Man '98	Bolt Crank	
1999	Cowboy Bebop	Andy Von de Oniyate	
1999	Master Keaton	Robert Fenders	
1999	Pocket Monsters	Jangō	
2000	Love Hina	Kōji Maehara	
2000	Platinumhugen Ordian	Baltoro	
2000	Shūkan Storyland	Leader, narration	
2001	PaRappa Rappa	Boxy Boy	
2001	Shaman King	Dōen	
2001	The SoulTaker	Richard Vincent	
2002	Tottoko Hamtaro	Lion-sensei	
2003	Astro Boy: Mighty Atom	Archer	
2003	Gad Guard	Jack Bruno	
2003	Gunslinger Girl	Hilshire	
2003	Mugen Senki Potorisu	Black-clothed man	
2003	Naruto	Might Guy	
2004	Agatha Christie's Great Detectives Poirot and Marple	George Challenger	
2004	Fullmetal Alchemist	Hohenheim Elric	
2004	Kaiketsu Zorori	Gaon, Husky	
2005	Majime ni Fumajime: Kaiketsu Zorori	Gaon, Husky	
2005	Shakugan no Shana	Alastor	
2005	Shinshaku Sengoku Eiyūdensetsu Sanada Ten Braves The Animation	Kuroda Nagamasa	
2005	Xenosaga: The Animation	Ziggurat 8	
2006	Demashita! Powerpuff Girls Z	Mojo Jojo	
2006	Ergo Proxy	MCQ	
2007	El Cazador de la Bruja	Shop Manager	
2007	Naruto: Shippuden	Might Guy, Might Duy	
2007	Nodame Cantabile	Sebastiano Viella	
2007	Shakugan no Shana Second	Alastor	
2008	Michiko to Hatchin	Old Gentleman	
2008	Negibōzu no Satarō	Aona no Shakimi	
2011	Shakugan no Shana Final	Alastor	
2012	Sword Art Online	Godfree	
2013	Magi: The Kingdom of Magic	Shambal Ramal	
2013	Space Battleship Yamato 2199	Osamu Yamanami	
2014	Future Card Buddyfight	Hitotaba Neginoyama/Captain Answer, Vlad Dracula	
2014	Tokyo ESP	Shin Kakuno	
2014	Nisekoi	Adlet Wogner Kirisaki	
2016	One Piece	Raizō	
2017	Space Battleship Yamato 2202: Warriors of Love	Osamu Yamanami	
2017	Vatican Miracle Examiner	Archbishop Saul	
2018	Pop Team Epic	Popuko (Series 1 Episode 1-A, Series 1 Remix Episode 12-B), Daddy (live-action portrayal) (Series 2 Episode 1)	
2019	No Guns Life	Christina Matsuzaki	
2021	Baki Hanma	Bob McCarthy	
2022	Life with an Ordinary Guy Who Reincarnated into a Total Fantasy Knockout	Narrator	
2023	Dark Gathering	Nankobo	
2026	The Ghost in the Shell	Handa Seiki President	
Unknown	Black Jack	Myū	
Unknown	Buso Renkin	Captain Bravo, Narrator	
Unknown	Crayon Shin-chan	Majī Di Gamecchini	
Unknown	Deltora Quest	Fallow, Prandine	
Unknown	Detective Conan	Keigo Endō, Yūji Mikasa	
Unknown	Fushigi no Umi no Nadia	Gonzales	
Unknown	Hakaba Kitarō	Johnny the Vampire	
Unknown	Initial D	—	series (Jōshima Toshiya)
Unknown	Jungle King Tar-chan	Alan	
Unknown	Kamisama Kazoku	Osamu Kamiyama	
Unknown	Kasumin	Haruo Kirima	
Unknown	Kekkaishi	Kouya	
Unknown	Kodomo no Omocha	Rick, narration	
Unknown	Legendz: Tale of the Dragon Kings	Yul Hepburn	
Unknown	Love Get CHU ~Miracle Seiyū Hakusho~	Kuroiwa	
Unknown	Madlax	Friday Monday	
Unknown	Magical Princess Minky Momo	Papa	
Unknown	Mashin Eiyūden Wataru	Thunder Blue	
Unknown	Obake no Horry	Nyangirasu, Mukimukin	
Unknown	Onegai My Melody ~ Kurukuru Shuffle!~	Flat-kun's papa	
Unknown	Pokonyan	Papa (Shigeru Konoha), Chanpuku	
Unknown	PoPoLoCrois Monogatari	White Knight	
Unknown	Robin Hood no Daibōken	Lord Alwine	
Unknown	Soreike! Uchū Senkan Yamamoto Yōko	Meo-Toroll no Fūrigā	
Unknown	Yokoyama Mitsuteru Sangokushi	Xun Yu	

=== OVA ===
Year	Title	Role
1990	Iczer Reborn	Rob
1991	Legend of the Galactic Heroes	Rockwell
1994	Armored Trooper Votoms: Kakuyakutaru Itan	Godiba
1997	Vampire Hunter: The Animated Series	Bishamon
1998	Detatoko Princess	Healthy three siblings
2004	Le Portrait de Petit Cossette	Marchello Orlando
Unknown	.hack//Liminality	Jun'ichirō Tokuoka
Unknown	FAKE	Berkeley Rose
Unknown	Genocyber	Captain
Unknown	Giant Robo The Animation – The Day the Earth Stood Still	Professor Go Gakujin
Unknown	The Hakkenden	Chudai, Daisuke Kanamari
Unknown	Jigoku Dō Reikai Tsūshin	Ghost
Unknown	Kidō Senshi SD Gundam Hakobiya Rigazi no Kiseki	Gerugugu
Unknown	Kidō Senshi SD Gundam SD Gundam Mō Race	Kozaku
Unknown	Kidō Senshi SD Gundam Yume no Maron Sha	Sazaby
Unknown	Sakura Taisen Gōka Kenran	Shigeki Kanzaki
Unknown	SD Sengokuden Musha Shichinin Shuu Hen	Kozaku
Unknown	Shakugan no Shana SP: Koi to Onsen no Kōgai Gakushū!	Lord of the Crimson Realm Alastor
Unknown	Soreike! Uchū Senkan Yamamoto Yōko	Meo-Toroll no Fūrigā

=== Theatrical animation ===
Year	Title	Role	Notes
1998	Perfect Blue	Murano	
2001	Metropolis	Ham Egg	
2002	One Piece: Chopper's Kingdom on the Island of Strange Animals	Count Butler	
2002	Pokémon Heroes	Latios	
2003	Crayon Shin-chan: Fierceness That Invites Storm! Yakiniku Road of Honor	Chōkurō Shimoda	
2006	Bleach: Memories of Nobody	Ganryu	
2012	Road to Ninja: Naruto the Movie	Might Guy	
2016	Kizumonogatari II Nekketsu-hen	—	
2021	The House of the Lost on the Cape	—	
Unknown	Resident Evil: Degeneration	Frederic Downing	
Unknown	Shakugan no Shana	Lord of the Crimson Realm Alastor	
Unknown	A Tree of Palme	Gariko	

=== Video games ===
Year	Title	Role	Notes
1999	Ace Combat 3	Abyssal Dision	
2004	Ace Combat 5: The Unsung War	Seryozha Viktrovich Nikanor	
2005	Kingdom Hearts II	Lumiere	
2009	Final Fantasy XIII	Sazh Katzroy	
2011	Final Fantasy XIII-2	Sazh Katzroy	
2013	Metal Gear Rising: Revengeance	Monsoon	
2013	Lightning Returns: Final Fantasy XIII	Sazh Katzroy	
2018	Soulcalibur VI	Azwel	
2020	Dragon Ball Z: Kakarot	Mr. Satan	
Unknown	Aba Renbō Princess	Henry Orion	
Unknown	Asura's Wrath	Deus	
Unknown	Atelier Viorate ~Alchemist of Gramnad 2~	Offen Schwach	
Unknown	Beyond: Two Souls	Cole Freeman; Japanese dub	
Unknown	Brave Fencer Musashi	Yami no Majin, Reigando, Rento, Rūmu	
Unknown	Dairantō Smash Brothers X	Latios	
Unknown	Dark Sector	Robert Mezner	
Unknown	Dengeki Gakuen RPG: Cross of Venus	Alastor	
Unknown	Initial D Arcade Stage	—	series (Jōshima Toshiya)
Unknown	Heart of Darkness	Amigo, Servant	
Unknown	JoJo's Bizarre Adventure: All-Star Battle	Mohammed Avdol	
Unknown	Kabu Trader Shun	Tōru Narasaki	
Unknown	The Legend of Xanadu	—	series (Daimos)
Unknown	Nanatsuiro Drops Pure!!	Lord of the Crimson Realm Alastor	
Unknown	PoPoLoCrois Monogatari II	White Knight	
Unknown	Remember 11: The Age of Infinity	Seiji Yomogi	
Unknown	Sakura Taisen 2 ~Kimi, Shinitamō koto Nakare~	Shigeki Kanzaki	
Unknown	Scandal	Ryō	
Unknown	Shadow Hearts: From the New World	Ricardo Gomez	
Unknown	Shakugan no Shana	Lord of the Crimson Realm Alastor	
Unknown	Sly 3: Honor Among Thieves	Dr. M; Japanese dub	
Unknown	Sonic and the Secret Rings	Erazor Djinn	
Unknown	Sō Raku Toshi Osaka	Iwai Sanjan	
Unknown	Spider-Man	Shocker, J. Jonah Jameson; Japanese dub	
Unknown	Tales of Eternia	Fog, Shadow	
Unknown	Tales of Fandom Vol.1	Fog	
Unknown	Tales of the World: Narikiri Dungeon 2	Fog	
Unknown	Tales of the World: Narikiri Dungeon 3	Fog	
Unknown	Tropico	Minister's secretary	
Unknown	Warriors Orochi 4	Ujiyasu Hojo; replacing Unsho Ishizuka	
Unknown	Xenosaga I & II	Ziggurat 8	
Unknown	Xenosaga Episode I: Der Wille zur Macht	Ziggurat 8	
Unknown	Xenosaga Episode II: Jenseits von Gut und Böse	Ziggurat 8	
Unknown	Xenosaga Episode III: Also sprach Zarathustra	Ziggurat 8	
Unknown	Xenosaga Freaks	Ziggurat 8	
Unknown	Zone of the Enders	Nōman	

=== Puppetries ===
Year	Title	Role
2009–2010	The Three Musketeers	Aramis, M. de Tréville, Cardinal Richelieu
2014	Sherlock Holmes	Deputy Headmaster Moriarty, Barnicot

=== TV drama ===
Year	Title	Role
1977	Kashin	Issei Maebara
1979	Kusa Moeru	Follower
1980	Shōgun	Suga
1983	Tokugawa Ieyasu	Attendant

=== Tokusatsu ===
Year	Title	Role
1988	Kamen Rider Black RX	—
1996	Gekisou Sentai Carranger	PP Rappa (ep. 11)
2011	Kaizoku Sentai Gokaiger	Dyrandoh (ep. 41 – 44, 49 – 51)
2019	Rider Time Shinobi	Yami Shinobi

=== Radio drama ===
Year	Title	Role
2006	Kerberos Panzer Jäger	Captain Deisler

=== CD ===
Year	Title	Role
????	Buso Renkin	Captain Bravo
????	The Legend of Xanadu II: Heroine-tachi no Tanjōbi	Daimos
????	Xenosaga Outer File	Ziggurat 8

=== Dubbing roles ===
==== Live-action ====
Actor	Year	Title	Version	Role	Notes
Tom Hanks	1993	Sleepless in Seattle	1997 Fuji TV edition	Sam Baldwin	
Tom Hanks	1994	Forrest Gump	VHS/DVD and 2000 Fuji TV editions	Forrest Gump	
Tom Hanks	1995	Apollo 13	VHS/DVD and 2003 Fuji TV editions	Jim Lovell	
Tom Hanks	1998	Saving Private Ryan	VHS/DVD edition	Captain John H. Miller	
Tom Hanks	1998	You've Got Mail	2001 Fuji TV edition	Joe Fox	
Tom Hanks	1999	The Green Mile	VHS/DVD and 2002 Fuji TV editions	Paul Edgecomb	
Tom Hanks	2002	Road to Perdition		Michael Sullivan, Sr.	
Tom Hanks	2002	Catch Me If You Can		Carl Hanratty	
Tom Hanks	2004	The Ladykillers		G.H. Dorr, Ph. D	
Tom Hanks	2004	The Terminal	VHS/DVD and Fuji TV editions	Viktor Navorski	
Tom Hanks	2006	The Da Vinci Code	DVD/BD and 2009 Fuji TV editions	Robert Langdon	
Tom Hanks	2007	Charlie Wilson's War		Charlie Wilson	
Tom Hanks	2009	Angels & Demons		Robert Langdon	
Tom Hanks	2011	Extremely Loud & Incredibly Close		Oskar Schell	
Tom Hanks	2013	Captain Phillips		Richard Phillips	
Tom Hanks	2015	Bridge of Spies		James B. Donovan	
Tom Hanks	2016	Inferno		Robert Langdon	
Tom Hanks	2016	A Hologram for the King		Alan Clay	
Tom Hanks	2016	Sully	2020 The Cinema edition	Chesley "Sully" Sullenberger	
Tom Hanks	2017	The Circle		Eamon Bailey	
Tom Hanks	2017	The Post		Ben Bradlee	
Tom Hanks	2019	A Beautiful Day in the Neighborhood		Fred Rogers	
Tom Hanks	2020	Greyhound		Captain Ernest Krause	
Tom Hanks	2020	Brain Games		Tom Hanks	
Tom Hanks	2021	News of the World		Captain Jefferson Kyle Kidd	
Tom Hanks	2021	Finch		Finch Weinberg	
Tom Hanks	2022	Elvis		Colonel Tom Parker	
Tom Hanks	2022	Pinocchio		Geppetto	
Tom Hanks	2022	A Man Called Otto		Otto Anderson	
Bill Murray	1981	Stripes		John Winger	
Bill Murray	1988	Scrooged		Francis Xavier "Frank" Cross	
Bill Murray	1989	Ghostbusters II	1992 Fuji TV edition	Doctor Peter Venkman	
Bill Murray	1993	Mad Dog and Glory		Frank Milo	
Bill Murray	1994	Ed Wood		Bunny Breckinridge	
Bill Murray	1996	Kingpin		Ernie McCracken	
Bill Murray	1996	Larger than Life		Jack Corcoran	
Bill Murray	1996	Space Jam		Bill Murray	
Bill Murray	1997	The Man Who Knew Too Little		Wallace Ritchie	
Bill Murray	1998	Wild Things	DVD edition	Kenneth Bowden	
Bill Murray	1999	Cradle Will Rock		Tommy Crickshaw	
Bill Murray	2000	Charlie's Angels		John Bosley	
Bill Murray	2003	Lost in Translation		Bob Harris	
Bill Murray	2007	The Darjeeling Limited		The Businessman	
Bill Murray	2014	The Monuments Men		Sgt. Richard Campbell	
Bill Murray	2014	St. Vincent		Vincent MacKenna	
Bill Murray	2020	On the Rocks		Felix Keane	
Bill Murray	2022	The Greatest Beer Run Ever		The Colonel	
Bill Murray	2023	Ant-Man and the Wasp: Quantumania		Lord Krylar	
Robin Williams	1987	Good Morning, Vietnam	1993 Fuji TV edition	Adrian Cronauer	
Robin Williams	1989	Dead Poets Society	1994 Fuji TV edition	John Keating	
Robin Williams	1993	Mrs. Doubtfire	1998 Fuji TV edition	Daniel Hillard	
Robin Williams	1995	Jumanji	VHS/DVD/Blu-ray, 1998 Fuji TV and 2000 TV Asahi editions	Alan Parrish	
Robin Williams	1995	Nine Months		Dr. Kosevich	
Robin Williams	1996	Jack	2001 Fuji TV edition	Jack Powell	
Robin Williams	1999	Jakob the Liar		Jakob	
Robin Williams	1999	Bicentennial Man	VHS/DVD edition	Andrew Martin	
Robin Williams	2002	Insomnia	2006 TV Tokyo edition	Walter Finch	
Robin Williams	2002	One Hour Photo		Sy Parrish	
Robin Williams	2004	House of D		Pappas	
Robin Williams	2006	Man of the Year		Tom Dodds	
Robin Williams	2006	RV		Bob Munro	
Wesley Snipes	1993	Demolition Man		Simon Phoenix	
Wesley Snipes	1994	Drop Zone	1998 TV Asahi edition	Pete Nessip	
Wesley Snipes	1995	Money Train	VHS/DVD and 2001 TV Asahi editions	John	
Wesley Snipes	1996	The Fan	1998 TV Asahi edition	Bobby Rayburn	
Wesley Snipes	1997	Murder at 1600	1999 TV Asahi edition	Detective Harlan Regis	
Wesley Snipes	1997	One Night Stand		Maximilian Carlyle	
Wesley Snipes	1998	Futuresport		Obike Fixx	
Wesley Snipes	1998	U.S. Marshals	2001 TV Asahi edition	Mark J. Sheridan/Warren/Roberts	
Wesley Snipes	2000	Disappearing Acts		Franklin Swift	
Wesley Snipes	2002	Undisputed		Monroe "Undisputed" Hutchen	
Wesley Snipes	2014	The Expendables 3		Doctor Death	
Wesley Snipes	2019	Dolemite Is My Name		D'Urville Martin	
Wesley Snipes	2021	Coming 2 America		Gen. Izzi	
Eddie Murphy	1984	Best Defense		Lieutenant T.M. Landry	
Eddie Murphy	1994	Beverly Hills Cop III	VHS/DVD edition	Detective Axel Foley	
Eddie Murphy	1995	Vampire in Brooklyn	VHS edition	Maximillian, Preacher Pauly, Guido	
Eddie Murphy	1996	The Nutty Professor	VHS/DVD edition	Professor Sherman Klump, Buddy Love, Cletus 'Papa' Marcellus Klump, Anna Pearl 'Mama' Jensen Klump, Ida Mae 'Granny' Jensen, Ernie Klump Senior	
Eddie Murphy	1998	Dr. Dolittle	VHS/DVD edition	Doctor John Dolittle	
Eddie Murphy	1999	Bowfinger		Kit Ramsey/Jiffrenson 'Jiff' Ramsey	
Eddie Murphy	1999	Life		Ray Gibson	
Eddie Murphy	2000	Nutty Professor II: The Klumps	VHS/DVD edition	Professor Sherman Klump, Buddy Love, Cletus 'Papa' Marcellus Klump, Anna Pearl 'Mama' Jensen Klump, Ida Mae 'Granny' Jensen, Ernie Klump Senior, Lance Perkins	
Eddie Murphy	2001	Dr. Dolittle 2	VHS/DVD edition	Doctor John Dolittle	
Eddie Murphy	2008	Meet Dave		Dave Ming-Chang, The Captain	
Eddie Murphy	2009	Imagine That		Evan Danielson	
Will Smith	1997	Men in Black	VHS/DVD edition	Agent J	
Will Smith	2002	Men in Black II	VHS/DVD edition	Agent J	
Will Smith	2006	The Pursuit of Happyness	DVD edition	Chris Gardner	
Will Smith	2007	I Am Legend		Lieutenant Colonel Robert Neville	
Will Smith	2008	Hancock	DVD edition	John Hancock	
Will Smith	2012	Men in Black 3		Agent J	
Will Smith	2019	Gemini Man		Henry Brogan	
Andy García	1987	The Untouchables	1990 Fuji TV edition	George Stone	
Andy García	1989	Black Rain	1996 Fuji TV edition	Detective Charlie Vincent	
Andy García	1990	The Godfather Part III	1994 Fuji TV edition	Vincent Mancini-Corleone	
Andy García	1992	Hero	VHS/DVD and 1997 NTV editions	John Bubber	
Andy García	1995	Steal Big Steal Little		Ruben Partida Martinez, Robert Martin, Narrator	
Andy García	1995	Things to Do in Denver When You're Dead		Jimmy 'The Saint' Tosnia	
Alec Baldwin	1990	The Hunt for Red October	1999 TV Asahi edition	Jack Ryan	
Alec Baldwin	1993	Malice	1996 TV Tokyo edition	Doctor Jed Hill	
Alec Baldwin	1994	The Getaway		Doc McCoy	
Alec Baldwin	1994	The Shadow		Lamont Cranston / The Shadow	
Alec Baldwin	1998	Mercury Rising	VHS/DVD edition	Lieutenant Colonel Nicholas Kudrow	
Alec Baldwin	2000	Thomas and the Magic Railroad		Mr. Conductor	
Bruce Campbell	2002	Spider-Man		Ring announcer	
Bruce Campbell	2004	Spider-Man 2		Snooty usher	
Bruce Campbell	2007	Spider-Man 3		French maître d'	
Bruce Campbell	2007	Burn Notice		Sam Axe	
Bruce Campbell	2015	Ash vs Evil Dead		Ash Williams	
Bruce Campbell	2022	Doctor Strange in the Multiverse of Madness		Pizza Poppa vendor	
Willem Dafoe	1997	Speed 2: Cruise Control		John Geiger	
Willem Dafoe	1999	The Boondock Saints		Agent Paul Smecker	
Willem Dafoe	2002	Auto Focus		John Henry Carpenter	
Willem Dafoe	2009	The Boondock Saints II: All Saints Day		Agent Paul Smecker	
Willem Dafoe	2009	Daybreakers		Lionel "Elvis" Cormac	
Vince Vaughn	2004	Dodgeball: A True Underdog Story		Peter LaFleur	
Vince Vaughn	2005	Mr. & Mrs. Smith	2010 TV Asahi edition	Eddie	
Vince Vaughn	2006	The Break-Up		Gary Grobowski	
Vince Vaughn	2012	The Watch		Bob McAllister	
Vince Vaughn	2020	Freaky		The Butcher	
Michael Moore		Bowling for Columbine		—	
Michael Moore		Fahrenheit 9/11		—	
Michael Moore		Sicko		—	
Michael Moore		8mm		Tom Welles (Nicolas Cage)	
Michael Moore		16 Blocks	2009 TV Asahi edition	Edward Bunker (Mos Def)	
Michael Moore		The Absent-Minded Professor		Professor Shelby Ashton (Elliott Reid)	
Michael Moore		The Abyss	1991 Fuji TV edition	Lieutenant Hiram Coffey (Michael Biehn)	
Michael Moore		Ace Ventura: Pet Detective		Ace Ventura (Jim Carrey)	
Michael Moore		Ace Ventura: When Nature Calls		Ace Ventura (Jim Carrey)	
Michael Moore		Alien vs. Predator		Graeme Miller (Ewen Bremner)	
Michael Moore		Aliens	VHS/DVD edition	Private William Hudson (Bill Paxton)	
Michael Moore		Aliens	1988 TBS edition	Private Mark Drake (Mark Rolston)	
Michael Moore		Aliens	2004 TV Asahi edition	Carter J. Burke (Paul Reiser)	
Michael Moore		Alive		Roberto Canessa (Josh Hamilton)	
Michael Moore		Ally McBeal		John Cage (Peter MacNicol)	
Michael Moore		Always		Ted Baker (Brad Johnson)	
Michael Moore		The Animal		Marvin Mange (Rob Schneider)	
Michael Moore		Anne of Green Gables		Mister Phillips (Paul Brown)	
Michael Moore		Annie: A Royal Adventure!		Rupert Hogbottom (Crispin Bonham-Carter)	
Michael Moore		Armageddon		2002 Fuji TV edition	(Colonel Lev Andropov (Peter Stormare)
Michael Moore		Armageddon	2004 NTV edition	Lieutenant General Kimsey (Keith David)	
Michael Moore		Armour of God II: Operation Condor	1995 TV Asahi edition	Frank the Guard	
Michael Moore		Around the World in 80 Days		Inspector Fix (Ewen Bremner)	
Michael Moore		As Good as It Gets		Frank Sachs (Cuba Gooding Jr.)	
Michael Moore		Assassins	1999 Fuji TV edition	Miguel Bain (Antonio Banderas)	
Michael Moore		Babe	2001 NTV edition	Ferdinand the Duck (Danny Mann)	
Michael Moore		Baby's Day Out		Edgar "Eddie" Mauser (Joe Mantegna)	
Michael Moore		Back to the Future Part II		Goldie Wilson III (Donald Fullilove)	
Michael Moore		Bad Boys	VHS/DVD edition	Captain Howard (Joe Pantoliano)	
Michael Moore		Bad Boys II	DVD edition	Captain Howard (Joe Pantoliano)	
Michael Moore		Bad Boys for Life		Captain Howard (Joe Pantoliano)	
Michael Moore		Bad Boys: Ride or Die		Captain Howard (Joe Pantoliano)	
Michael Moore		Batman	1995 TV Asahi edition	Alexander Knox (Robert Wuhl)	
Michael Moore		Bean	2000 Fuji TV edition	David Langley (Peter MacNicol)	
Michael Moore		Beethoven	1995 NTV edition	Vernon (Stanley Tucci)	
Michael Moore		Bella Martha		Mario (Sergio Castellitto)	
Michael Moore		Big		Paul Davenport (John Heard)	
Michael Moore		The Big Hit		Cisco (Lou Diamond Phillips)	
Michael Moore		Big Momma's House		Malcolm Turner (Martin Lawrence)	
Michael Moore		Big Momma's House 2		Malcolm Turner (Martin Lawrence)	
Michael Moore		Big Mommas: Like Father, Like Son		Malcolm Turner (Martin Lawrence)	
Michael Moore		Big Night		Secondo (Stanley Tucci)	
Michael Moore		Blood Simple		Ray (John Getz)	
Michael Moore		Boomerang	1996 Fuji TV edition	Tyler (Martin Lawrence)	
Michael Moore		Born on the Fourth of July	VHS edition	Steve Boyer (Jerry Levine)	
Michael Moore		The Bourne Identity	2006 Fuji TV edition	The Professor (Clive Owen)	
Michael Moore		The Cable Guy		Chip Douglas (Jim Carrey)	
Michael Moore		Casper: A Spirited Beginning		Tim Carson (Steve Guttenberg)	
Michael Moore		Category 6: Day of Destruction		Craig Shilts (Christopher Shyer)	
Michael Moore		Cedar Rapids		Dean Ziegler (John C. Reilly)	
Michael Moore		Cellular	2007 TV Asahi edition	Lawyer (Rick Hoffman)	
Michael Moore		Charlie's Angels: Full Throttle		Jimmy Bosley (Bernie Mac)	
Michael Moore		Charlie's Angels (2019) (Edgar "Bosley" Dessange (Djimon Hounsou))		—	
Michael Moore		Chasing Sleep		Ed Saxon (Jeff Daniels)	
Michael Moore		Cinema Paradiso		Ignazio	
Michael Moore		City Slickers II: The Legend of Curly's Gold		Mitch Robbins (Billy Crystal)	
Michael Moore		The Client		Barry "The Blade" Muldano (Anthony LaPaglia)	
Michael Moore		Constantine	2008 TV Asahi edition	Balthazar (Gavin Rossdale)	
Michael Moore		Contact	2001 TV Tokyo edition	Kent Cullers (William Fichtner)	
Michael Moore		Copycat		Daryll Lee Cullum (Harry Connick Jr.)	
Michael Moore		The Counselor		Reiner (Javier Bardem)	
Michael Moore		Crash Dive	1999 Fuji TV edition	James Carter (Michael Dudikoff)	
Michael Moore		Crash Dive 2	2001 Fuji TV edition	James Carter (Michael Dudikoff)	
Michael Moore		Creepshow		Harry Wentworth (Ted Danson)	
Michael Moore		CSI: Cyber		Simon Sifter (Peter MacNicol)	
Michael Moore		Cutthroat Island	1998 Fuji TV edition	Ainslee (Patrick Malahide)	
Michael Moore		The Dark Knight	2012 TV Asahi edition	Anthony Garcia (Néstor Carbonell)	
Michael Moore		The Day After Tomorrow	2006 TV Asahi edition	Jack Hall (Dennis Quaid)	
Michael Moore		Dead Ahead: The Exxon Valdez Disaster		Dan Lawn (John Heard)	
Michael Moore		Desperate Housewives		Peter McMillian (Lee Tergesen)	
Michael Moore		Die Hard		1990 TV Asahi edition	(Argyle (De'voreaux White)
Michael Moore		Die Hard	VHS/DVD edition	Richard Thornburg (William Atherton)	
Michael Moore		Die Hard 2	VHS/DVD and 1994 TV Asahi editions	Richard Thornburg (William Atherton)	
Michael Moore		Double Dragon		Koga Shuko (Robert Patrick)	
Michael Moore		Eat Pray Love		Felipe (Javier Bardem)	
Michael Moore		Escape from L.A.	2000 Fuji TV edition	Snake Plissken (Kurt Russell)	
Michael Moore		Exit Wounds	2004 NTV edition	Henry Wayne (Tom Arnold)	
Michael Moore		The Exorcist III	1994 Fuji TV edition	The Gemini Killer (Brad Dourif), Patient X (Jason Miller)	
Michael Moore		The Exorcist III	VHS edition	Dr. Bruno (Clifford David), Altar Boy (Kevin Corrigan)	
Michael Moore		Face/Off	2000 Fuji TV edition	Sean Archer (John Travolta)	
Michael Moore		The Fall Guy		Howie Munson (Douglas Barr)	
Michael Moore		Farewell My Concubine		Duan Xiaolou (Zhang Fengyi)	
Michael Moore		Father of the Bride		Franck Eggelhoffer (Martin Short)	
Michael Moore		Father of the Bride Part II		Franck Eggelhoffer (Martin Short)	
Michael Moore		Fire Birds	1993 TV Asahi edition	Jack Preston (Nicolas Cage)	
Michael Moore		Firelight		Charles Godwin (Stephen Dillane)	
Michael Moore		Firestorm		Jesse Graves (Howie Long)	
Michael Moore		The Flash		Henry Allen (John Wesley Shipp)	
Michael Moore		Freddy vs. Jason	VHS/DVD edition	Freddy Krueger (Robert Englund)	
Michael Moore		Frequency	2003 NTV edition	Satch DeLeon (Andre Braugher)	
Michael Moore		The Freshman		Victor Ray (Bruno Kirby)	
Michael Moore		Friends		Benjamin Hobart (Greg Kinnear)	
Michael Moore		The Full Monty		Lomper (Steve Huison)	
Michael Moore		Geronimo: An American Legend		Charles B. Gatewood (Jason Patric)	
Michael Moore		Get Smart	2011 TV Asahi edition	Maxwell Smart (Steve Carell)	
Michael Moore		Ghost	VHS/DVD and 1993 Fuji TV editions	Sam Wheat (Patrick Swayze)	
Michael Moore		G.I. Jane	2000 Fuji TV edition	Command Master Chief John Urgayle (Viggo Mortensen)	
Michael Moore		The Glimmer Man	DVD edition	Jim Campbell (Keenen Ivory Wayans)	
Michael Moore		Glory	1994 NTV edition	Robert Gould Shaw (Matthew Broderick)	
Michael Moore		Grace of My Heart		Joel Millner (John Turturro)	
Michael Moore		Guarding Tess		Doug Chesnic (Nicolas Cage)	
Michael Moore		The Grinch		Lou Lou Who (Bill Irwin)	
Michael Moore		Hank Zipzer		Mr. Rock (Henry Winkler)	
Michael Moore		Hard Boiled	VHS/DVD edition	Inspector "Tequila" Yuen (Chow Yun-fat)	
Michael Moore		Harry Potter		—	series (Lord Voldemort (Ian Hart / Ralph Fiennes))
Michael Moore		Hellboy II: The Golden Army		Johann Krauss (Seth MacFarlane)	
Michael Moore		Home Alone	1994 Fuji TV edition	Marv Murchens (Daniel Stern)	
Michael Moore		Home Alone 2: Lost in New York	1997 Fuji TV edition	Marv Murchens (Daniel Stern)	
Michael Moore		Home Alone 3	2001 Fuji TV edition	Burton Jernigan (Lenny Von Dohlen)	
Michael Moore		I Now Pronounce You Chuck & Larry		Captain Phineas J. Tucker (Dan Aykroyd)	
Michael Moore		Identity	2007 TV Tokyo edition	Doctor Malick (Alfred Molina)	
Michael Moore		Interview with the Vampire	1998 Fuji TV edition	Lestat de Lioncourt (Tom Cruise)	
Michael Moore		It Could Happen to You		Charlie Lang (Nicolas Cage)	
Michael Moore		It Takes Two		Roger (Steve Guttenberg)	
Michael Moore		The Jackal	2000 NTV edition	Ian Lamont (Jack Black)	
Michael Moore		Jerry Maguire	VHS/DVD edition	Rod Tidwell (Cuba Gooding Jr.)	
Michael Moore		JFK	1994 TV Asahi edition	David Ferrie (Joe Pesci)	
Michael Moore		Jingle All the Way	DVD edition	Ted (Phil Hartman)	
Michael Moore		Judge Dredd	1997 Fuji TV edition	Fergie (Rob Schneider)	
Michael Moore		Jungle 2 Jungle		Richard Kempster (Martin Short)	
Michael Moore		Jurassic Park		Mister DNA	
Michael Moore		Jurassic World		Mr. DNA	
Michael Moore		Jurassic World	2017 NTV edition	Simon Masrani (Irrfan Khan)	
Michael Moore		Kindergarten Cop	1995 TV Asahi edition	Cullen Crisp (Richard Tyson)	
Michael Moore		A Knight's Tale		Geoffrey Chaucer (Paul Bettany)	
Michael Moore		L.A. Confidential	2001 Fuji TV edition	Jack Vincennes (Kevin Spacey)	
Michael Moore		Lara Croft: Tomb Raider – The Cradle of Life	2006 TV Asahi edition	Terry Sheridan (Gerard Butler)	
Michael Moore		Last Action Hero	1996 Fuji TV edition	Benedict (Charles Dance)	
Michael Moore		The Last Boy Scout		1996 NTV edition	(James Alexander "Jimmy" Dix (Damon Wayans)
Michael Moore		The Last Boy Scout		1995 Fuji TV edition	(Milo (Taylor Negron)
Michael Moore		The Last Boy Scout	VHS/DVD edition	Chet (Kim Coates), Billy Cole (Billy Blanks)	
Michael Moore		The Living Daylights	1998 TV Asahi edition	General Georgi Koskov (Jeroen Krabbé)	
Michael Moore		Lock, Stock and Two Smoking Barrels		Tom (Jason Flemyng)	
Michael Moore		The Long Kiss Goodnight	2000 Fuji TV edition	Mitch Henessey (Samuel L. Jackson)	
Michael Moore		A Love Song for Bobby Long		Bobby Long (John Travolta)	
Michael Moore		Made in America		Hal Jackson (Ted Danson)	
Michael Moore		The Man Who Invented Christmas		John Dickens (Jonathan Pryce)	
Michael Moore		Mandela: Long Walk to Freedom		Nelson Mandela (Idris Elba)	
Michael Moore		Martin	2018 Blu-ray edition	Arthur (Tom Savini)	
Michael Moore		The Matrix Reloaded	2006 Fuji TV edition	Merovingian (Lambert Wilson)	
Michael Moore		The Matrix Revolutions	2007 Fuji TV edition	Merovingian (Lambert Wilson)	
Michael Moore		The Matrix Resurrections		Merovingian (Lambert Wilson)	
Michael Moore		Mission: Impossible	2003 TV Asahi edition	Eugene Kittridge (Henry Czerny)	
Michael Moore		Mission: Impossible – Dead Reckoning Part One		Eugene Kittridge (Henry Czerny)	
Michael Moore		Much Ado About Nothing		Don John (Keanu Reeves)	
Michael Moore		The Mummy Returns	Fuji TV edition	Jonathan Carnahan (John Hannah)	
Michael Moore		The Muppets Take Manhattan		Fozzie Bear	
Michael Moore		Muppets Tonight		Fozzie Bear, Doctor Bunsen Honeydew, Snooky	
Michael Moore		The Muppets' Wizard of Oz		Fozzie Bear, Doctor Bunsen Honeydew	
Michael Moore		Murder, She Wrote		Brian East (Bryan Cranston)	
Michael Moore		Mystery Date		Craig McHugh (Brian McNamara)	
Michael Moore		The Naked Gun		Lt. Frank Drebin Jr. (Liam Neeson)	
Michael Moore		Nanny McPhee		Cedric Brown (Colin Firth)	
Michael Moore		Natural Born Killers		Jack Scagnetti (Tom Sizemore)	
Michael Moore		The Negotiator	2001 TV Asahi edition	Lieutenant Danny Roman (Samuel L. Jackson)	
Michael Moore		Nemesis		Alex Raine (Olivier Gruner)	
Michael Moore		The Net		Dr. Alan Champion (Dennis Miller)	
Michael Moore		The NeverEnding Story II: The Next Chapter	TV Asahi edition	Barney Bux (John Wesley Shipp)	
Michael Moore		A Night in the Show		Mr. Pest and Mr. Rowdy (Charlie Chaplin)	
Michael Moore		Night Watch	1999 Fuji TV edition	Michael 'Mike' Graham (Pierce Brosnan)	
Michael Moore		A Nightmare on Elm Street	1988 Fuji TV edition	Freddy Krueger (Robert Englund)	
Michael Moore		Panic Room		Raoul (Dwight Yoakam)	
Michael Moore		The Pelican Brief	1996 TV Asahi edition	Fletcher Coal (Tony Goldwyn)	
Michael Moore		Platoon	1989 TV Asahi edition	Junior	
Michael Moore		Powder		Donald Ripley (Jeff Goldblum)	
Michael Moore		Predator	DVD edition	Rick Hawkins (Shane Black)	
Michael Moore		Predator 2		Jerry Lambert (Bill Paxton)	
Michael Moore		Prêt-à-Porter		Joe Flynn (Tim Robbins)	
Michael Moore		The Punisher		Terrone (Todd Boyce)	
Michael Moore		Red Dwarf		Arnold Rimmer (Chris Barrie)	
Michael Moore		Resident Evil	VHS/DVD edition	Spence Parks (James Purefoy)	
Michael Moore		Resident Evil: Apocalypse	2007 Fuji TV edition	Carlos Oliveira (Oded Fehr)	
Michael Moore		Robin Hood: Prince of Thieves	1996 Fuji TV edition	Robin Hood (Kevin Costner)	
Michael Moore		RoboCop	1990 TV Asahi edition	Leon Nash (Ray Wise)	
Michael Moore		RoboCop 2	1993 TV Asahi edition	Mayor Kuzak (Willard E. Pugh)	
Michael Moore		The Rocky Horror Picture Show	2010 Blu-ray edition	Doctor Frank-N-Furter (Tim Curry)	
Michael Moore		Rollerball	2005 TV Tokyo edition	Marcus Ridley (LL Cool J)	
Michael Moore		Roman Holiday	1994–2000 Fuji TV edition	Mario Delani (Paolo Carlini)	
Michael Moore		Romy and Michele's High School Reunion		Sandy Frink (Alan Cumming)	
Michael Moore		Rules of Engagement		Major Mark Biggs (Guy Pearce)	
Michael Moore		The Running Man	1990 TV Asahi edition	Harold Weiss (Marvin J. McIntyre)	
Michael Moore		Scent of a Woman		Charlie Simms (Chris O'Donnell)	
Michael Moore		School of Rock		Dewey Finn (Jack Black)	
Michael Moore		Screamers	2000 Fuji TV edition	Private Ross (Charles Powell)	
Michael Moore		Seed of Chucky		Redman	
Michael Moore		Shaft		Peoples Hernandez (Jeffrey Wright)	
Michael Moore		The Shawshank Redemption		Heywood (William Sadler)	
Michael Moore		Single White Female		Graham Knox (Peter Friedman)	
Michael Moore		Sleepers	VHS/DVD edition	Sean Nokes (Kevin Bacon)	
Michael Moore		Sleepers	1999 Fuji TV edition	Lorenzo "Shakes" Carcaterra (Jason Patric)	
Michael Moore		Snow Queen		Polar bear	
Michael Moore		The Specialist		Tomas Leon (Eric Roberts)	
Michael Moore		Species II	2002 Fuji TV edition	Dennis Gamble (Mykelti Williamson)	
Michael Moore		Speed	1997 Fuji TV edition	Jack Traven (Keanu Reeves)	
Michael Moore		Spielberg on Spielberg		Steven Spielberg	
Michael Moore		Step Brothers		Dale Doback (John C. Reilly)	
Michael Moore		Street Fighter		Ryu Hoshi (Byron Mann)	
Michael Moore		Supernatural		Crowley (Mark Sheppard)	
Michael Moore		S.W.A.T.	2006 NTV edition	Captain Thomas Fuller (Larry Poindexter)	
Michael Moore		Target		Chris Lloyd (Matt Dillon)	
Michael Moore		Telling Lies in America		Billy Magic (Kevin Bacon)	
Michael Moore		Tequila and Bonetti		Nico "Nick" Bonetti (Jack Scalia)	
Michael Moore		Terminal Velocity		Kerr (Christopher McDonald)	
Michael Moore		Terminator 2: Judgment Day	1993 Fuji TV edition	T-1000 (Robert Patrick)	
Michael Moore		The Thomas Crown Affair	VHS/DVD edition	Thomas Crown (Pierce Brosnan)	
Michael Moore		Three Fugitives		Ned Perry (Martin Short)	
Michael Moore		Thunderbirds Are Go	VHS edition	Doctor Tony Grant (Bud Tingwell)	
Michael Moore		Titanic	2001 Fuji TV edition	Caledon Hockley (Billy Zane)	
Michael Moore		Tomorrow Never Dies	2001 Fuji TV edition	James Bond (Pierce Brosnan)	
Michael Moore		Top Gun	1989 Fuji TV edition	LTJG Nick "Goose" Bradshaw (Anthony Edwards)	
Michael Moore		True Lies	VHS/DVD edition	Simon (Bill Paxton)	
Michael Moore		Twin Peaks		Albert Rosenfield (Miguel Ferrer)	
Michael Moore		Ultraman: The Ultimate Hero		Rick Sanders	
Michael Moore		Ultraviolet		Daxus (Nick Chinlund)	
Michael Moore		The Usual Suspects		Michael McManus (Stephen Baldwin)	
Michael Moore		V.I. Warshawski		Murray Ryerson (Jay O. Sanders)	
Michael Moore		Virus	2002 NTV edition	Hiko (Cliff Curtis)	
Michael Moore		Walk Hard: The Dewey Cox Story		Dewey Cox (John C. Reilly)	
Michael Moore		Wall Street	1991 Fuji TV edition	Bud Fox (Charlie Sheen)	
Michael Moore		Wedding Crashers		United States Secretary of the Treasury William Cleary (Christopher Walken)	
Michael Moore		White Noise		Jonathan Rivers (Michael Keaton)	
Michael Moore		Windtalkers	VHS/DVD edition	Private Pappas (Mark Ruffalo)	
Michael Moore		A Woman		Gentleman (Charlie Chaplin)	
Michael Moore		XXX	2007 TV Asahi edition	Xander Cage (Vin Diesel)	
Michael Moore		The Yellow Handkerchief		Brett Hanson (William Hurt)	

==== Animation ====
Title	Role	Notes
WALL-E	AUTO	
Space Jam: A New Legacy	Sylvester	
Thomas & Friends	James (succeeding Katsuji Mori), The Thin Clergyman	
Brother Bear	Ram #2	
