= Xenosaga I & II =

2006 video game

- Developer(s): Monolith Soft; Tom Create
- Publisher(s): Namco
- Director(s): Hagiwara Tomohiro
- Producer(s): Hagiwara Tomohiro; Okamoto Shinichiro
- Artist(s): Hiroshi Takeuchi
- Writer(s): Yuichiro Takeda; Tetsuya Takahashi
- Composer(s): Kousuke Yamashita
- Series: Xenosaga
- Platform(s): Nintendo DS
- Release: JP: March 30, 2006
- Genre(s): Role-playing
- Mode(s): Single-player

Xenosaga I & II (Note: Zenosāga Wan & Tsū (ゼノサーガ I&II, stylised as Xenosaga I・II)) is a 2006 role-playing video game co-developed by Monolith Soft and Tom Create, and published by Namco for the Nintendo DS. A spin-off of the Xenosaga trilogy and forming part of the Xeno metaseries, Xenosaga I & II retells the events of Xenosaga Episode I and Xenosaga Episode II while expanding on its characters and narrative. Displayed from an angled two-dimensional perspective, Xenosaga I & II makes use of a turn-based battle system with elements carried over from the main Xenosaga games.

Monolith Soft's first portable game, Xenosaga I & II began development in 2005 following the completion of Xenosaga: The Animation. The scenario, drafted and supervised by series creator Tetsuya Takahashi, was intended to retell the story of the two games while incorporating events that had originally been cut. The game was released exclusively in Japan in March 2006, receiving generally positive reviews from critics but was not commercially successful.

== Gameplay ==
A battle in Xenosaga I & II; carrying over several mechanics from the main Xenosaga games, the game also has several unique mechanics.

Xenosaga I & II is a role-playing video game which retells the events of Xenosaga Episode I and its direct sequel Episode II. Cutscenes and the in-game environments and character sprites are displayed on the Nintendo DS (DS) console's top screen, with events outside still animated cutscenes taking place from an angled top-down perspective using two-dimensional graphics. Additional information is displayed on the DS's bottom screen. Environments can be freely explored, with breakable chests holding consumable items and accessories. Shops within the levels can be used to purchase items and equipment using in-game currency. Special EVA structures within the environment can be used to recover health points (HP) and a type of skill point called ether points (EP). Characters are able to both roam around open environments and enter story-based dungeons. During the course of the story, the player receives emails through the U.M.N. service, which is also used to store the game's glossary, a store of information on the world and characters.

Unlike the original versions, Xenosaga I & II features random encounters within the environment, with enemies only appearing in the battle arena. During battle, the battle arena is displayed on the DS's top screen while commands and party status is displayed on the bottom screen. Battles are governed by a turn-based battle system similar to the main Xenosaga games. Battles take plates on a 5x6 grid divided between the main party and the enemy party. During their turn, a character can move to any part of their half of the grid.

The party's statistics are divided between HP, EP which is drained by using Ether abilities, attack points (AP) when a party member performs an attack, and a boost count gauge which is filled when an enemy attacks. Each character is given two actions per turn, with one physical and one magical attack per character. When a character has three AP available, they can attack twice and trigger a special cinematic attack which deals high damage. The Boost meter, once filled, grants either side additional turns.

In addition to independent movements, the party can create formations, with specific formations triggering different status buffs such as regenerating HP or AP. New formations are acquired through the course of the game, and are specific to characters. Following each battle, characters gain both experience points and ability points; the former raises their experience level and general statistics, while the latter are used as currency to unlock more or upgrade existing abilities. Each character's equipment can be enhanced through the combined effects of assigning types of equipment and items or accessories to a particular character, strengthening their abilities. In addition to standard battles, characters have access to mechs with their own move sets and abilities, with basic mechanics shared with normal battles.

== Development and release ==
Early development work for Xenosaga I & II began following the completion of Xenosaga: The Animation in 2005, although plans existed while the anime was in development. Xenosaga I & II was co-developed by Xenosaga series developer Monolith Soft and external studio Tom Create. It was Monolith Soft's first time developing a portable game, as they had previously only worked on home console titles. The script was written by Yuichiro Takeda, whose previous work included both Xenosaga: The Animation and Xenosaga CD dramas. The script was based on drafts by series creator Tetsuya Takahashi, who supervised the writing process. Staff related to multiple video game and anime projects took part, with their previous work including Xenosaga: The Animation. Character designs were redrawn by Hiroshi Takeuchi, who had done artwork for Cowboy Bebop and My-HiME. The drawing director was Ai Kikuchi, who had worked on the anime adaptation of the Star Ocean: The Second Story manga. Cutscene director Hiroyuki Okawa had worked on both Xenosaga: The Animation and Mobile Suit Gundam SEED. Coloring for cutscene artwork was done by Studio Deen. The music was composed by Kousuke Yamashita, who had previously worked on both Xenosaga: The Animation and the Nobunaga's Ambition series. Due to the size of the narrative, the game used a 2D art style so minimal story content was cut. Voice acting was limited to victory quotes after successful battles, with the rest of the story communicated solely with text.

Takeda was first shown the project while still working on Xenosaga: The Animation, a work load he estimated at six months. Once work on the anime had finished, Takeda and Takahashi began work on the script. Takahashi created the draft based on his original plans for the Xenosaga storyline, which had needed substantial alteration for the original Episode I and Episode II due to both design and time limitations. The scenario for Episode I required little alteration as it was relatively unaltered from Takahashi's initial draft. For Episode II, more substantial alterations were made such as rearranging flashback sequences so the story would maintain an uninterrupted flow, and greatly expanding information concerning the Immigrant Fleet faction and the origins of central character Jr.. During the "beta" period of script development, the scenario for Episode II only made up 30% of the whole game, which was seen as a drastic imbalance requiring rewrites to address it. To better connect the two storylines, characters from Episode II were given minor cameos within the events of Episode I. A major change was the shift to the viewpoint of main protagonist Shion Uzuki, as Episode II originally portrayed events from the perspective of Jr., a concession that enabled events to be fleshed out. Despite these changes, keeping the narrative consistent with the in-development Xenosaga Episode III was a necessity. Ultimately the scenario came close to what Takahashi originally intended for Episode I and Episode II. The total writing work on Xenosaga I & II lasted over six months, with Takeda needing to visit Monolith Soft's offices once a week to discuss the script.

The game was first announced in December 2004 under the working title Xenosaga DS alongside a DS game in the Baten Kaitos series. The game's official title and release window were announced in September 2005 alongside reveal of Xenosaga Episode III and Baten Kaitos Origins. The game released on March 30, 2006; it was the fourth video game release in the Xenosaga franchise. Along with the mobile spin-off Xenosaga: Pied Piper, Xenosaga I & II remains exclusive to Japan.

== Reception ==
Reception

Review scores
Publication	Score
Famitsu	31/40
RPGamer	4/5
RPGFan	82%

During its debut week on sale in Japan, the game debuted outside the top ten, reaching fifteenth place with sales of over 17,000 units. These low sales were noted as disappointing for a game within the Xenosaga series, which was still popular in Japan. By the end of 2006, the game had sold 38,500 units.

While Japanese magazine Famitsu praised the game's storyline, with one reviewer saying the story was the main reason for playing the game, another reviewer found the technical terminology slowed the pace. RPGFan writer Neal Chandran felt that the story was lacking despite the additions and supplementary material, although he found that the story delivery struck a better balance with gameplay than the original games. RPGamer's Michael Baker positively compared the story to "a particularly well-organized season of Star Trek: The Next Generation" in spite of the need to read the in-game encyclopedia to keep up with its terminology, but noted that the amount of text could be off-putting, also citing the game being in Japanese as a barrier to importing the title.

In its review, one Famitsu reviewer found elements of the gameplay quite challenging despite it being an "orthodox" role-playing game. Chandran enjoyed the additions to saving and navigation, and praised the battle system despite some pacing issues and annoying mechanics. Baker praised the streamlining of general gameplay and the battle system, lauding the removal of the more convoluted mechanics of the original games. His main complaint was the mini-games, which he found lacked substance. Bethany Massimilla of GameSpot compared the battle system to the mainline Xenosaga titles, positively noting the battle system mechanics.
