= Xenosaga =

Role-playing video game series

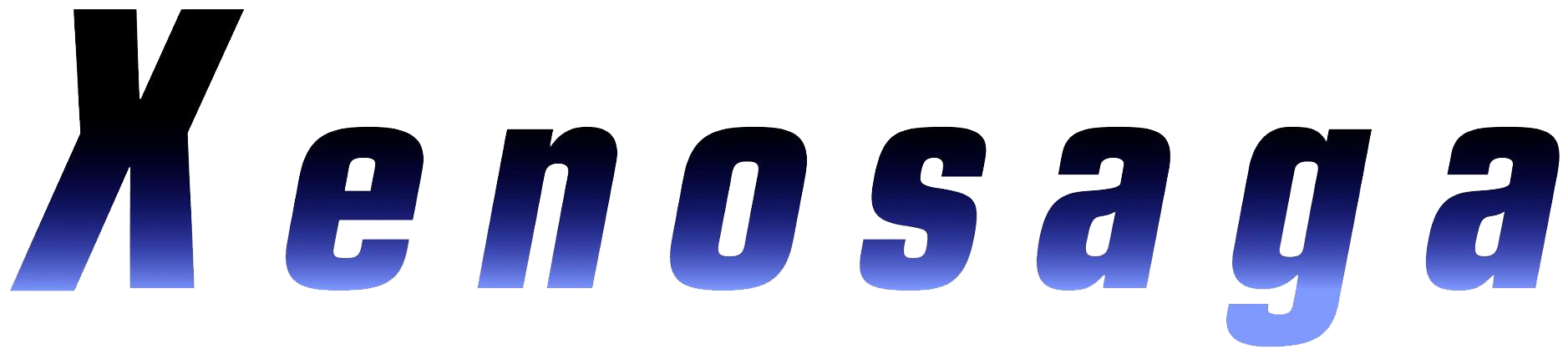
- Genre: Role-playing
- Developers: Monolith Soft; Tom Create (I & II, Pied Piper); Namco Mobile (Pied Piper)
- Publishers: JP: Namco; NA: Namco Bandai Games; EU: Sony Computer Entertainment
- Creator: Tetsuya Takahashi
- Platforms: PlayStation 2, Mobile, Nintendo DS
- First release: Xenosaga Episode I February 28, 2002
- Latest release: Xenosaga Episode III; July 6, 2006
- Parent series: Xeno

Xenosaga (Note: Zenosāga (Japanese: ゼノサーガ)) is a role-playing video game series developed by Monolith Soft and primarily published by Namco. Forming part of the wider Xeno metaseries, Xenosaga is set in a science fiction universe and follows a group of characters as they face both a hostile alien race called the Gnosis and human factions fighting for control of the Zohar, an artifact connected to a god-like energy called U-DO. Gameplay across the series is similar, with the characters being guided through a linear narrative and fighting enemies using a turn-based combat system. The party fights both on foot and in a variety of mechs.

Tetsuya Takahashi created Xenosaga as a spiritual successor to the Square-produced Xenogears, for which he founded Monolith Soft with help from Namco; multiple Xenogears staff returned, including co-writer Soraya Saga. Following the release of the first game, the Xenosaga series was given over to new staff with Takahashi both supervising the project and providing the draft scripts. Under the new staff, the original script saw several changes and its planned six-part structure cut down by half. The series made considerable use of Biblical imagery and elements of the works of Carl Jung and Friedrich Nietzsche, with the subtitles of the main trilogy drawing from the works of Nietzsche.

Reception of individual titles has been positive, although journalists have commented that the series was too ambitious. While the first game met with strong sales, the series as a whole was a commercial disappointment. The first game also received both a manga and an anime adaptation, the latter being dubbed and released in North America. Following the end of the Xenosaga series, Takahashi and other team members started a new project to rebuild morale, which became Xenoblade Chronicles. Characters from Xenosaga would go on to appear in multiple crossover games.

== Titles ==
=== Games ===
Xenosaga spans five different games sharing a single continuity; the three mainline games for the PlayStation 2, a spin-off and prequel for mobile devices, and a remake of the first two entries in the trilogy for the Nintendo DS. Each title in the trilogy features a subtitle taken from the published work of German philosopher Friedrich Nietzsche.

Release timeline
2002	Episode I: Der Wille zur Macht
2003
2004	Episode II: Jenseits von Gut und Böse
2004	Pied Piper
2005
2006	I & II
2006	Episode III: Also sprach Zarathustra

- Xenosaga Episode I (Note: Zenosāga Episōdo Wan: Chikara e no Ishi (Japanese: ゼノサーガ エピソードI 力への意志)) was first released in Japan on February 28, 2002, for the PlayStation 2 (PS2). Its North American release came on February 25, 2003. An international version titled Xenosaga Episode I Reloaded was released in Japan on November 20, 2003. The game's subtitle, Der Wille zur Macht, was taken from the native title of The Will to Power, a posthumously published collection of notes written by Friedrich Nietzsche.
- Xenosaga Episode II (Note: Zenosāga Episōdo Tsū: Zen'aku no Higan (Japanese: ゼノサーガ エピソードII 善悪の彼岸)) was released on June 24, 2004, in Japan for the PS2. The game was released in North America on February 15, 2005. In Europe, the game was published by Sony Computer Entertainment Europe on October 28, 2005. It is the only game to have been released in Europe. The subtitle, Jenseits von Gut und Böse, is taken from the native title of Nietzsche's philosophical novel Beyond Good and Evil.
- Xenosaga: Pied Piper (Note: Zenosāga: Paido Paipā (Japanese: ゼノサーガ パイド パイパー)) was released across three episodes between July and October 2004 for Vodafone mobile devices. A version for NTT DoCoMo's i-mode service was released on July 5, 2006. Pied Piper remains exclusive to Japan. Its subtitle is inspired by the German fable of the Pied Piper of Hamelin.
- Xenosaga I & II (Note: Zenosāga Wan & Tsū (ゼノサーガ I&II; stylised as Xenosaga I・II)) was released in Japan on March 30, 2006, for the Nintendo DS. The game is a remake of Episode I and Episode II, with redrawn artwork, gameplay adjusted for a portable platform, and additional story elements based on cut content from the home console versions. Like Pied Piper, Xenosaga I & II remains exclusive to Japan.
- Xenosaga Episode III (Note: Zenosāga Episōdo Surī: Tsaratusutora wa Kaku Katariki (Japanese: ゼノサーガ エピソードIII ツァラトゥストラはかく語りき)) was released in Japan on July 6, 2006, for the PlayStation 2 console. It was released in North America on August 29 of the same year, published by the then-rebranded Namco Bandai Games. The game is the last entry to have been released in the Xenosaga series to date. The subtitle, Also Sprach Zarathustra, is taken from Nietzsche's novel Thus Spoke Zarathustra.

=== Additional media ===
Following the release of Episode I, a supplementary disc titled Xenosaga Freaks (Note: Zenosāga Furīkusu (Japanese: ゼノサーガ フリークス)) was released on April 28, 2004. The disc features a visual novel segment featuring multiple characters from the game, a minigame dubbed XenoPitten, a dictionary that explains the game's terminology, and a demo for Episode II. Freaks was part of a movement with the Xenosaga series to turn it into a multimedia franchise, with the project growing substantially larger than previously planned. Xenosaga Episode I was adapted as a manga by Atsushi Baba and published through Monthly Comic Zero Sum. It was later released in three volumes by publisher Ichijinsha between 2004 and 2006. Additionally an anime adaptation titled Xenosaga: The Animation, which adapted the events of the first game, was produced by Toei Animation. Originally broadcast on TV Asahi between January and March 2005. the anime was later licensed and dubbed for a North American release; originally licensed by A.D. Vision, the North American rights are currently held by Funimation Entertainment. Multiple staff from Xenosaga: The Animation later worked on Xenosaga I & II.

== Common elements ==
=== Gameplay ===
Gameplay in the Xenosaga series feature similar gameplay across its various entries. The core gameplay revolves around the player controlling a party of characters navigating different environments including dungeons, with combat initiated when exploring environments and touching sprites representing enemy groups. Combat makes use of a traditional turn-based battle system, with basic mechanics involving the spending or conserving of Action Points (AP). Battles feature combat using both human party members, and in mecha known under different titles in each game. Episode I introduces the basic gameplay and combat systems. Episode II incorporates multiple levels of attack types which different enemies are weak to, combined with alterations to the performance of mechs. Episode III further expands upon the system, and mechs have expanded functions including dedicated dungeon environments. Xenosaga I & II reworks the gameplay systems; combat takes place during random encounters while exploring, and characters are arranged and have elements of their combat dictated by their placement on a grid. Pied Piper incorporates gameplay systems similar to Episode I adjusted for mobile devices, with navigation separate from battles which take place in a virtual zone tied to the narrative.

=== Setting ===
The Xenosaga series takes place within a single science fiction universe. In the year "20XX", humanity discovers the Zohar—a primordial artifact which connects to the realm of a god-like energy dubbed U-DO—is discovered on Earth and allows travel beyond the Solar System. A disaster causes Earth's location to be lost, becoming known as "Lost Jerusalem". By the game's events, humanity has adopted a new calendar system dubbed "Transcend Christ" (T.C.), with the series' events beginning in T.C. 4768—equivalent to A.D. 7278, with humanity forming a Galaxy Federation. Planets are connected through a warp travel network called the Unus Mundus Network (U.M.N.), managed by Vector Industries, which also controls interests in the Federation's military. Existing alongside humans are Realians, synthetic humans who hold equal status with natural humans. The Federation is attacked by the Gnosis, an ancient species revealed to be formed of souls who rejected U-DO. Vector develops two different weapon systems to fight the Gnosis: humanoid mecha dubbed AGWS (Anti Gnosis Weapon System), and the similar but more powerful KOS-MOS battle androids. There also exist more advanced AGWS models called E.S., powered by Lost Jerusalem artifacts called Vessels of Anima. A key backstory event is the Miltian Conflict, which occurred fourteen years before the events of Episode I. Beginning as a war between the U-TIC Organization and the Federation, it escalated when a group of Realians went berserk when an experiment to suppress U-DO's energies went wrong. Miltia was lost in a space-time anomaly. Key organizations include the Federation government; the Kukai Foundation, a group that acts as a shelter for enhanced humans including U.R.T.V.s; Vector Industries, a megacorporation controlling the U.M.N.; a splinter faction called the U-TIC Organization; religious cult Ormus, which funds U-TIC; and the Testaments, a group of men who have been granted a form of immortality following their original deaths.

The first game follows series protagonists Shion Uzuki and prototype battle android KOS-MOS escaping a Gnosis attack and traveling to Second Miltia aboard the passenger freighter Elsa, where they meet a young man called chaos. Together with U.R.T.V. and Kukai co-founder Jr., the group thwart the plans of Albedo Piazzolla, Jr.'s biological brother. In Episode II, Albedo uses information gathered during the events of Episode I to open the way to the original planet Miltia, which becomes the focus of a conflict between the Federation and Ormus. Ormus' leader Sergius gains control of a powerful mech called Proto Omega, destroying Miltia in the process. He is then killed by the Testaments, who give Albedo control of Proto Omega, forcing Jr. to kill him. In Episode III, Shion, KOS-MOS, chaos and the rest of their group confront both the Testaments—which includes a resurrected Albedo—and Vector CEO Wilhelm. Wilhelm is revealed to be an immortal being stopping the universe's destruction through eternal recurrence. The group defeats him, then KOS-MOS and chaos help banish the Gnosis to the region of Lost Jerusalem. Shion and Jr. set off to find Lost Jerusalem and save the universe. Pied Piper follows the character Jan Sauer—later known as the cyborg Ziggurat 8 (Ziggy for short)—as he investigates the crimes of a cyberspace-based serial killer a century before the events of Episode I.

== History ==
=== Concept and development ===
The creator of Xenosaga was Tetsuya Takahashi, who had previously worked at Square on multiple projects including entries in the Final Fantasy series. Together with his wife Soraya Saga, Takahashi created a proposal for Final Fantasy VII; while rejected, they were allowed to develop the proposal as its own project, titled Xenogears. A sequel to Xenogears was allegedly in the planning stages, but it was never released. Wanting to create his own project, unable to get suitable funding from Square, and disagreeing with Square's focus on its major franchises such as Final Fantasy, Takahashi left Square and founded Monolith Soft with a number of staff from Xenogears. Creating the proposal for Xenosaga during 1999 as a six-part series, development began on the first game in 2000 under the codename "Project X", taking two years to develop with a staff of between 60 and 100 people, with around 20 of them being veterans of Xenogears. The team were helped by Namco, who provided funding and acted as the publisher. The scenario was written by Takahashi and Saga. The Xenosaga series, while carrying over thematic and design elements from Xenogears, is an unconnected spiritual successor to that game.

Following the release of Episode I, Takahashi and other Monolith Soft staff reassessed the series and the general structure of Monolith Soft. Takahashi, who had acted as the first game's director, stepped down to allow the Xenosaga series to grow. He gave the development of Episode II and future Xenosaga projects to a team of younger developers. The new team decided to shift the game's focus based on player feedback and expand the series into other media. Takahashi continued to act as a supervisor to ensure the series remained true to the original overall plan. The draft, created by Takahashi and Saga, was turned into a script by Norihiko Yonesaka, who needed to condense and even cut several events from the original draft to fit it into a single game. Saga later commented that these changes resulted in the planned scenario for Episode III also being changed. A portion of the intended narrative of Episode II was turned into the plot of Pied Piper. Pied Piper was co-developed by Monolith Soft, Namco Mobile and Tom Create. Following the completion of Episode II and Pied Piper, Saga left the series.

Episode I and Episode II were remade as Xenosaga I & II, which was Monolith Soft's first portable title and co-developed with Tom Create. Takahashi worked with scenario writer Yuichiro Takeda on the scenario, which was to both include the original games' events and incorporate elements and scenarios cut from the original versions. While doing this, Takahashi and Takeda needed to keep the scenario consistent with the in-development Episode III. The volume of the game's scenario and Takahashi's wish to cut as little story as possible resulted in the game being given a two-dimensional artstyle. Episode III, which began development during the last development stages for Episode II, was designed to be the last entry in the Xenosaga series. In addition to up the story of Shion while also leaving room for further entries if there was enough demand, further adjustments were made to both gameplay and graphics based on combined staff comments and fan feedback. Takahashi supervised the project and created the draft, with the script again being written by Yonesaka.

The Xenosaga series incorporates multiple references to Biblical mythology, Jewish mysticism and Gnosticism; several character, object and place names (such as Nephilim, Zohar, Gnosis, Merkabah) are taken from sources within these belief systems. The universal structure incorporates elements of Zen, with the names of central characters KOS-MOS and chaos being deliberate homages to the universal concepts of order and chaos. It additionally draws on the philosophy and literature of Carl Jung and Nietzsche. Nietzsche in particular is heavily referenced throughout the Xenosaga trilogy, with each entry taking its subtitle from the native title of one of his famous works; for Episode I and Episode II, the subtitles tied directly into the story themes and characters. The subtitle of Pied Piper likewise tied to the game's narrative.

=== Music ===
The score for Episode I was composed by Yasunori Mitsuda, who had created the music for Xenogears. Mitsuda worked with Takahashi to create tracks based upon specific locations and scenario elements rather than general recycled tracks for segments of the game. For Episode II, the music was composed by three people: Yuki Kajiura, who had found fame as a composer for anime series; Shinji Hosoe, who worked on Street Fighter EX and the Ridge Racer series; and Ayako Saso, who had composed for Galaxian and Street Fighter EX. Kajiura worked on tracks which played during cinematic cutscenes, while Hosoe and Saso composed other cutscene music and gameplay tracks. Hosoe and Saso worked together as part of the Super Sweep music group, but they did not collaborate with Kajiura on any tracks, or even meet with her during the game's production. Kajiura returned to create the entire score for Episode III, drawing upon the game's concept art and scenario when creating the music. All three games have received album releases, although both Episode II and Episode III saw large portions of their scores go unreleased due to varying factors.

== Reception ==
In an article for 1UP.com about video game series that had ended prematurely, Scott Sharkey felt that no-one was surprised when the series ended with Episode III as he deemed the series far too ambitious. Jeremy Parish, writing for USGamer, felt that Takahashi managed to "[come] through" despite his planned six-part series being cut down by half, with Episode III being a satisfactory conclusion to the series' storyline. He also noted that Xenosaga showed a trend with Takakashi's work of being ambitious to the point of needing to compromise the original plan due to external limitations. Blake Peterson, in a feature on the Xenosaga series, felt that the success of later Xeno titles—which took a different approach and had met with critical and commercial success—meant that the Xenosaga series would not be continued.

=== Individual titles ===
Japanese and Western review scores As of July 26, 2017.
Game	Famitsu	Metacritic
Xenosaga Episode I	33/40	83/100 (35 reviews)
Xenosaga Episode II	33/40	73/100 (45 reviews)
Xenosaga I & II	31/40	—
Xenosaga Episode III	33/40	81/100 (34 reviews)

Episode I received positive reviews upon release. The narrative was generally praised for its complex structure and cinematic approach, while its gameplay was seen as enjoyable despite initially being complicated even by genre standards and the mech segments not feeling consequential. The graphics and music were generally praised, although the latter was felt to be too sparse. Episode II, which had seen its gameplay and graphics reworked from Episode I, received praise from critics for both these adjustments and the refocusing of its narrative despite the latter's short length. The replacement of some of the original English voice actors also came in for criticism.

Episode III received praise for its narrative and the way it concluded the series' overarching plot, but many felt that there was too much need for knowledge of the original games for it to be enjoyable for newcomers. The battle system and character customization also saw praise, although other gameplay aspects such as side activities divided opinion. Xenosaga I & II was generally praised by critics; while some more technical elements of the story slowed the pace, the narrative was generally seen as the game's strongest feature, while the general gameplay and battle system were also praised for removing the more convoluted elements from the mainline titles. In import reviews, it was commented that the extensive amount of Japanese text would be the largest barrier for those who wished to import the game from Japan.

=== Sales ===
Episode I managed a strong debut, selling over 240,000 units within three days of its release, and becoming the seventh best-selling game in Japan during 2002. It was also a commercial success internationally, going on to sell over one million copies. Episode II debuted at #2 in sales charts, going on to sell 280,000 in Japan during 2004. It also saw commercial success in North America, although no sales figures were revealed. Despite this, Episode II underperformed commercially, reaching just over 50% of Namco's projected sales target. Xenosaga I & II met with poor sales, with its debut being seen as disappointing for the still-popular series, and going on to sell over 38,000 units during 2006. Episode III debuted with sales approaching 124,000, noted as being the lowest debut for the main trilogy. Selling over 181,000 copies in Japan during 2006, it went on to sell 343,000 units across Japan, mainland Asia and North America by February 2007. Takahashi later stated that the series as a whole had underperformed.

== Legacy ==
The initial success of Xenosaga turned Monolith Soft into a popular developer, with Namco placing the company alongside Namco Tales Studio as a valuable development partner. Following the release of Episode III, and the mixed reception received by the series as a whole, the entire development team were in a state of low morale. Partly to boost team morale and create a game players would enjoy, the team developed a new RPG for the Wii. Originally titled Monado: Beginning of the World, its title was eventually changed to Xenoblade Chronicles. During its development, the team moved away from the narrative and design techniques used for the Xenosaga games, which were considered old-fashioned. The success of Xenoblade Chronicles led to the development of further Xenoblade titles. In a later interview, Takahashi stated that he would be willing to develop further titles in the Xenosaga series if funding was provided.

The character KOS-MOS was included as part of the playable cast of Namco × Capcom for the PlayStation 2, a crossover title developed by Monolith Soft featuring characters from both Namco and Capcom-owned game franchises. KOS-MOS and her rival from Xenosaga Episode III T-elos appeared in Super Robot Taisen OG Saga: Endless Frontier. Supporting character MOMO was later introduced alongside KOS-MOS and T-elos in the game's sequel Super Robot Taisen OG Saga: Endless Frontier Exceed. Both KOS-MOS and T-elos starred in Project X Zone for the Nintendo 3DS, a spiritual successor to Namco × Capcom from the same development team. KOS-MOS also appeared in its sequel Project X Zone 2 alongside Xenoblade Chronicles heroine Fiora. KOS-MOS and T-elos made cameo appearances as titular blades in Xenoblade Chronicles 2; the game's Nintendo Switch 2 port adds MOMO as an unlockable blade. KOS-MOS's head armor from Xenosaga I makes a late game appearance in Tales of Arise as part of its artifacts system. KOS-MOS was added as a playable character during a limited-time event in Tales of the Rays, additionally, costumes based on MOMO, T-elos and chaos were added for other playable characters.
