= Xenosaga Episode III =

2006 video game

- North American version cover art
- Developer: Monolith Soft
- Publisher: Namco Bandai Games (Note: Published under the Namco brand in Japan.)
- Director: Koh Arai
- Producer: Tomohiro Hagiwara
- Artist: Kouichi Mugitani
- Writer: Norihiko Yonesaka
- Composer: Yuki Kajiura
- Series: Xenosaga
- Platform: PlayStation 2
- Release: JP: July 6, 2006; NA: August 29, 2006
- Genre: Role-playing
- Mode: Single-player

Xenosaga Episode III: Also sprach Zarathustra (Note: Zenosāga Episōdo Surī: Tsaratusutora wa Kaku Katariki (Japanese: ゼノサーガ エピソードIII ツァラトゥストラはかく語りき)) is a role-playing video game developed by Monolith Soft and published by Namco Bandai Games for the PlayStation 2 in 2006. It is the final entry in both the Xenosaga trilogy and the larger Xenosaga series, which forms part of the Xeno franchise. Concluding the narrative of Xenosaga Episode I and Episode II, Episode III sees Shion Uzuki and the battle android KOS-MOS search out the origins of the hostile alien Gnosis while being hunted by Shion's former employers and four powerful humans called the Testaments. Gameplay is carried over from the first two games, featuring exploration of environments through a linear narrative, while battles follow a turn-based system featuring multiple leveling systems and combat with both a human party and mecha.

Concept work for Xenosaga Episode III began during the later development of Xenosaga Episode II in 2004. The development team's aim was to address issues raised by fans and staff with the previous two Xenosaga games, along with bringing the story to a satisfactory conclusion. Due to the decision to turn the intended six-part series into a trilogy, the original draft for Episode III was substantially reworked. As with previous Xenosaga titles, the subtitle was drawn from the work of German philosopher Friedrich Nietzsche.

Upon release, the game was praised by critics, and went on to sell over 340,000 copies worldwide. The mixed response to the Xenosaga series left Monolith Soft staff in a state of low morale, partially leading to the development of Xenoblade Chronicles.

== Gameplay ==
A battle in Xenosaga Episode III, featuring Jin Uzuki attacking a group of enemies during a battle

Xenosaga Episode III is a role-playing video game where players take control of a party of characters; during the game they explore a variety of environments from towns and cities to dungeons. During the course of the game, a Database is filled out which holds entries on terminology, characters, story events and earlier events from past Xenosaga games. The game features a variety of quests including the main narrative and side quests accepted from non-playable characters. The party can purchase items and equipment from shops found in friendly environments throughout the game. Gameplay segments are separated by story sequences, which are told through both traditional full-motion cutscenes and segments with voiced text boxes within the game environments. Enemies such as monsters can be seen in environments, to be avoided or engaged as wished; the party can also place traps which temporarily immobilize an enemy unit. When the party makes contact with a monster, the battle is initiated. Triggering a battle with a trapped enemy grants a boost in battle. Combat is split into two types; one with the human party members, and one using combat mechs dubbed E.S. units.

When battle begins, the player and enemy parties fight in a dedicated combat arena. The combat is governed by a turn-based battle system. The player party is restricted to three members, but at the cost of one turn an active character can be switched out for a reserve character. Each character has a certain number of health points (HP) and Ether points (EP). If all HP is depleted, a character is defeated. Turn order is governed by a character's "Agility" statistic. Each character can take a variety of actions, ranging from attacking, performing special attacks called "Arts" and using Ether abilities that each consume EP, using items, taking defensive positions that reduce damage, and escaping the battle. Both the player party and enemies have Break gauges, which fill up when either side successfully lands an attack. When the gauge fills, that character is stunned and cannot act for two turns, in addition becoming more vulnerable to a high-damage Critical attack. The Break gauge can be reduced by using Ether abilities, which can also be used along with items to recover HP.

Each player character has a "Boost" gauge that builds up during battle, which can be used to either perform two actions in a single turn, or deliver character-specific special attacks. If an enemy is killed with a special attack—an action labelled "Finish Strike"—at the end of a battle, they are granted a boost to their experience points (EXP), in-game money and skill points (SP) used to upgrade abilities. EXP raises a character's health and basic statistics. SP are invested in skill trees for each character, with each tree having a different emphasis in its skills to unlock; some trees include powerful Ether attacks, others Break damage, and others defensive or supportive abilities.

Combat in E.S. mecha is governed by similar mechanics to normal battle. Some dungeons in the game are only navigable with mechs, while others enable the player to switch between navigating on foot or in mechs. Three mechs can be active at any one time, with a fourth in reserve to replace one which is knocked out in battle. Mechs can perform standard and special attacks, with the type of attacks available determined by that mech's equipped weapon. Each mech has a finite energy level, which their equipped weapon draws upon to perform an action. Each time a mech strikes an enemy with an attack, their Anima gauge will fill up. When full, the mech can enter "Anima Mode", a temporary state where attack power is raised and energy costs for actions are lowered. E.S. units are customized and upgraded in five different areas, with each area granting different status buffs to the mech, such as raising health regeneration during charging periods or increasing EXP awarded at the end of a battle.

== Synopsis ==
=== Setting ===
Like the rest of the series, Xenosaga Episode III takes place in a science fiction universe. In the year "20XX", the Zohar—an artifact dating from the beginning of the universe which connects to the realm of a god-like energy dubbed U-DO—was unearthed by an archeological expedition in Kenya; the Zohar is key to enabling humanity to travel in space beyond the Solar System. Over 4,000 years in the future, humanity has left Earth behind to colonize the galaxy following a terrible event. This resulted in Earth's location being lost and the planet being dubbed "Lost Jerusalem"; by the game's events, humanity has adopted a new calendar system dubbed "Transcend Christ" (T.C.), with the game's events taking place in T.C. 4768—equivalent to A.D. 7278. Humanity is now spread across 500,000 planets, with their governments forming the Galaxy Federation. Planets are connected through a warp travel network called the Unus Mundus Network (U.M.N.). The U.M.N. is managed by Vector Industries, which also controls interests in the Federation's military. Existing alongside humans are Realians, synthetic humans who hold equal status with natural humans. The Federation has come under attack from an ancient alien race called the Gnosis, which begins decimating Federation worlds. As normal weapons are ineffective, Vector develops two different weapon systems designed to fight them: humanoid mecha dubbed A.G.W.S. (Anti Gnosis Weapon System), and the similar but more powerful KOS-MOS battle androids. There also exist more advanced AGWS models called E.S., powered by Lost Jerusalem artifacts called Vessels of Anima. Important organizations include the Kukai Foundation, a group that acts as a shelter for enhanced humans; the U-TIC Organization, a once-scientific group that now wishes to gain control of the Zohar; and Ormus, a secretive cult from Lost Jerusalem which secretly funds U-TIC and operates through a political faction called the Immigrant Fleet.

A key episode in the game's backstory is the Miltian Conflict, which occurred fourteen years before the events of Episode I on the planet Miltia; beginning due to a war between U-TIC and the Federation, it escalated due to a group of Realians going berserk and attacking people indiscriminately. The planet of Miltia was lost in a space-time anomaly when an experiment involving U.R.T.Vs—an army of 669 genetically modified children designed to combat U-DO's energies—goes horribly wrong. During the events of Xenosaga Episode I, main protagonist Shion Uzuki and her creation the anti-Gnosis android KOS-MOS are forced to escape a Gnosis attack triggered by the discovery of a Zohar Emulator, a manmade copy of the Zohar. During their journey to Second Miltia aboard the passenger freighter Elsa, they are pursued by U-TIC forces; encounter more Gnosis seeking the Zohar Emulator; and Shion experiences visions of a young girl named Nephilim. Sheltering with the Kukai Foundation, they are eventually forced to confront Albedo Piazzolla, an unhinged U.R.T.V. determined to reach Miltia, when he threatens Second Miltia with a powerful weapon called the Proto Merkabah. The group destroy the Proto Merkabah, but Albedo escapes with data that could open the way to Miltia. During Xenosaga Episode II, Albedo succeeds in accessing Miltia, using the conflict between Ormus and the Federation to access a powerful mech called the Proto Omega. The Testaments grant him access to the Zohar, forcing party member and fellow U.R.T.V. Jr. to kill him. Following the defeat of the Proto Omega, the Zohar is absorbed by a giant ship dubbed "Abel's Ark". Over the next year, Shion discovers that Vector and her father were directly involved in the U-TIC's activities, resigning from Vector following a series of Gnosis attacks dubbed the "Gnosis Terrorism".

=== Characters ===
The main protagonists are Shion Uzuki, a former employee of Vector Industries; and KOS-MOS, a prototype anti-Gnosis battle android. They are accompanied on their journey by Jr., a U.R.T.V. survivor who runs the Kukai Foundation with his brother Gaignun and commands both the Elsa and the ship Durandal; Jin Uzuki, Shion's brother and a veteran of the Miltian Conflict; chaos, a melancholy young man with mysterious powers; MOMO, a prototype Realian created by U-TIC scientist Joachim Mizrahi and modeled after his dead daughter; Ziggy—short for Ziggurat 8—a cyborg who acts as MOMO's guardian; and Canaan, a combat Realian who worked with chaos during the Miltian Conflict. Other characters include Allen Ridgeley, a former co-worker of Shion; Wilhelm, CEO of Vector and the main antagonist; T-elos, an anti-Gnosis battle android similar to KOS-MOS; Margulis, a high-ranking officer in U-TIC; Dmitri Yuriev, creator and biological father of the U.R.T.Vs who has survived through possessing Gaignun's body; Nephilim, a young girl who appears to Shion in visions; and Abel, a young man connected to U-DO. Serving Wilhelm are the Testaments, resurrected men with supernatural abilities; they are the Red Testament Kevin Winnicot, Shion's former love interest; the Blue Testament Luis Virgil, a former Federation officer; the Black Testament Voyager, an old adversary of Ziggy; and the White Testament Albedo, the U.R.T.V. "brother" of Jr. and Gaignun.

=== Plot ===
Following her resignation from Vector in the wake of her discoveries and the Gnosis Terrorism, Shion allies with underground group Scientia to investigate. Her former co-worker Allen takes her place looking after KOS-MOS. Meanwhile, Canaan, Jr., Jin, chaos, MOMO and Ziggy are investigating a landmass that originated from Lost Jerusalem. They are attacked by Margulis, then the landmass is swallowed with the Elsa in an inverted pocket of hyperspace. Shion meanwhile visits Allen, and sees the demonstration of two new weapons for fighting the Gnosis—T-elos, a battle robot meant to replace KOS-MOS; and Omega, a mech created from the Proto Omega's remains and piloted by Abel. After the test, T-elos' creator Roth Mantel informs Allen that KOS-MOS will be scrapped so development can focus on T-elos. As KOS-MOS's weaponry is the only way to break into the hyperspace pocket and save the Elsa, Shion leads the group into the facility and rescues KOS-MOS, guided at one point by Abel. During this time, Shion has frequent visions of the girl Nephilim, and has blackouts where she is contacted by U-DO. Events are also observed by Wilhelm, who is working with the Testaments to find both Abel and Abel's Ark.

Entering the hyperspace pocket, the group find the Elsa and investigate the area, encountering both Albedo and Virgil and learning that the Vessels of Anima powering their E.S. mecha are key to the Testaments' plans. They are then confronted by Mantel—who reveals himself as the Red Testament—and T-elos. T-elos almost kills KOS-MOS, but Shion's pendant activates, apparently transporting them to the planet Miltia fifteen years into the past, in reality a world within Shion's subconscious. They are attacked by Voyager, who is beaten back by a redesigned KOS-MOS. During the group's time there, Shion learns the true events that caused Miltia's fall; her father, Kevin, Margulis and Mizrahi were attempting to control the Zohar through experiments involving both Shion and her mother, but when U-TIC and Federation forces clashed, Kevin and Margulis released unstable combat Realians which slaughtered nearly everyone in the battle. The trauma caused the young Shion to resonate with the Zohar, summoning the Gnosis and awakening U-DO; it was only Mizrahi's self-sacrifice in sealing away Miltia which stalled U-DO's spread. The group fight Virgil before he is calmed by the spirit of Febronia—who tended him when he was injured on Miltia and with whom he formed an attachment prior to her death—and follows her into the afterlife. The Red Testament also appears, revealing his true identity as Kevin and asking Shion to join him.

Evading Kevin and T-elos, the group escape from Shion's subconscious back into the normal world, but following this Shion becomes emotionally unstable. During their absence, the Federation government is manipulated by Yuriev into assaulting Ormus in search of an artifact called Zarathustra. Abel's Ark, summoned by the events in Shion's subconscious, appears in the real world and begins causing planets to vanish as it pursues Zarathustra. Nephilim asks Shion to free Abel from Yuriev's control, then Yuriev leads the Federation fleet and Omega to capture the Durendal. Yuriev activates the Zohar Emulators stored in the Durandal, intent on using them in combination with Omega and Abel's Ark to defeat U-DO by rising to godhood. The group successfully infiltrate Abel's Ark, where Jr. kills Yuriev with help from Albedo. Albedo then teleports Abel and the Zohar away. The conflict results in Albedo's consciousness merging with Jr., while Gaignun dies along with Yuriev. The group follow Abel and the Zohar to the planet Michtam, the holy land of Ormus. There they kill a disillusioned Margulis, and Canaan sacrifices himself to destroy Voyager.

Descending deeper into Michtam, Shion experiences visions of Lost Jerusalem, seeing chaos under the name "Yeshua" alongside a previous incarnation of herself, KOS-MOS's physical template Mary Magdalene, and Jesus prior to his death. In a final confrontation with T-elos, they learn that T-elos and KOS-MOS were both designed by Wilhelm and the Testaments to resurrect Mary Magdalene, with KOS-MOS holding her spirit and T-elos being made from her body. The group are then confronted by Kevin, who asks KOS-MOS and Shion to join him. Shion, blinded by her love, joins him until Allen convinces her otherwise, voicing his own long-held love. The group then confront Wilhelm at Zarathustra's resting place. Wilhelm reveals that he has been preserving the universe from ending due to human wills that reject connection with U-DO; by capturing U-DO's "eyes" Abel and Abel's Ark and using eternal recurrence, Wilhelm has trapped the universe in a time loop with the power of Zarathustra and the Zohar. The Gnosis are revealed to be spawned from the wills that reject U-DO and escape from U-DO's realm. Shion, whose necklace and will are key to activating Zarathustra, is tortured by Wilhelm in an attempt to make her wish for recurrence. KOS-MOS shatters the necklace, preventing the recurrence from ever happening. A redeemed Kevin then sacrifices himself to destroy Wilhelm, allowing the group to cripple Zarathustra.

Abel, Nephilim, KOS-MOS and chaos choose to stay on Michtam, drawing all Gnosis to them and using a dimensional shift to move that region of space to Lost Jerusalem. Their actions and the release of chaos's Anima energy—which is accelerating the universe's death—will delay the universe's destruction, giving Shion time to find Lost Jerusalem and discover the key to changing humanity's will and saving the universe. During the escape, Jin returns to help chaos and KOS-MOS and dies fighting off the Gnosis. The resultant explosion of energy from the dimensional shift destroys the U.M.N., rendering faster-than-light travel impossible. Shion goes with Jr. and Allen on the Elsa to find Lost Jerusalem, while MOMO stays behind with Ziggy to reconstruct a new travel network with Scientia's help. In the mid and post-credit scenes, a badly damaged KOS-MOS floats through space and is contacted by chaos, saying they will both awake when they are needed. KOS-MOS is last seen drifting towards Lost Jerusalem.

== Development ==
Development of Xenosaga Episode III began in 2004 during the final development stages of Episode II. While Xenosaga was initially planned as a six-part series, changes at developer Monolith Soft resulted in series creator Tetsuya Takahashi giving guidance of the series to younger developers within the company. During this period, the team decided to turn the Xenosaga series into a trilogy, resulting in changes to the planned scenario and some elements being turned into side projects such as Xenosaga: Pied Piper. The director was Koh Arai, who had previously directed Episode II. Takahashi drafted and supervised the scenario, which was written by Episode II writer Norihiko Yonesaka. One of the main goals when developing Episode III was not only to bring a satisfactory end to the Xenosaga storyline up to that point, but to address criticism of the short length of Episode II's story, while also addressing general problems noticed with both Episode I and Episode II. Namco Bandai later stated in an interview that the game's final form was based on both fan feedback and the wishes of internal staff, with the final game being "something very close to what [they believed] to be the original ideal".

According to original Xenosaga writer Soraya Saga, the changes to the original narrative plan for Episode II resulted in several narrative shifts within Episode III, deviating from Takahashi and Saga's original draft. The scenario for Episode III includes narrative elements Takahashi originally created for Episode II, which had been cut from Episode II due to time constraints. As with the rest of the trilogy, the game made heavy use of Biblical mythology. The game's subtitle was taken from the native title of Thus Spoke Zarathustra, a novel by German philosopher Friedrich Nietzsche. The use of Nietzsche's works and concepts was a recurring element in the series. The original character artist for Xenosaga, Kunihiko Tanaka, was replaced by Kouichi Mugitani, who also acted as production designer as he had for the previous Xenosaga games. The character designs were adjusted to balance between the designs of Episode I and Episode II, expressing both realism and an exaggerated "cute" artstyle. While most of the designs were adaptions of Tanaka's earlier work, Mugitani also designed a new version of KOS-MOS and multiple new mechs. Mugitani's mech and armor designs drew from both the Gundam franchise and the 1997 film adaptation of Starship Troopers.

Xenosaga Episode III was officially announced in 2005, alongside Xenosaga I & II—a Nintendo DS remake of the first two Xenosaga episodes—and Baten Kaitos Origins. With its announcement, it was widely confirmed that it would be the last installment in the Xenosaga series. While Episode III was intended as the conclusion of Shion's story arc and potentially the series, the team were willing to continue the series if the game was a commercial success. As part of its promotion, a Flash-based visual novel titled A Missing Year was released through the series website. The game was announced for a western release in April 2006. For its western release, all scenes where blood was visible were censored: the blood was removed, but all other elements remained unchanged, resulting in visual and audio inconsistencies. The game released in Japan on July 6, 2006 by Namco; in North America, the game released on August 29 of that year by Namco Bandai Games. The game was localized for the West by Namco Bandai and 8-4; Xenosaga Episode III was one of 8-4's earliest projects. English dubbing was handled by Cup of Tea Productions, who had previously worked on Episode II. Several original voice actors from Episode I, including KOS-MOS's original English actress Bridget Hoffman, were brought back after the recasting for Episode II. Unlike Episode II, Episode III was not released in Europe.

=== Music ===
The music for Episode III was composed by Yuki Kajiura. Having previous contributed to the score of Episode II by composing the cimenatic tracks, Kajiura was brought back to compose the entire score. Despite the increased work load of handling an entire game's soundtrack, Kajiura found the difficulty similar to the work she did on Episode II. She drew inspiration from the game's artwork and impression of the setting when creating the score. Takahashi, in addition to his other roles in production, acted as coordinator for the score. A soundtrack album titled Xenosaga Episode III: Also Sprach Zarathustra Original Sound Best Tracks, featuring selections from the game's score, was published by Victor Entertainment on July 12, 2006. The album's brevity was due to the fact that the full soundtrack would have taken up six CDs, and so Kajiura was asked by sound producer Keiichi Nozaki to create samples for a two-disc release.

== Reception ==
Reception

Aggregate score
Aggregator	Score
Metacritic	81/100 (34 reviews)

Review scores
Publication	Score
Eurogamer	7/10
Famitsu	33/40
GamePro	4/5
GameSpot	8/10
GameSpy	3.5/5
IGN	8/10
RPGamer	4.5/5

During its debut week, Xenosaga Episode III reached number 2 in the charts behind New Super Mario Bros. with sales approaching 124,000 units. While its sales were stronger than Xenosaga I & II, it was a lower debut than the previous entries in the trilogy. It sold over 181,000 copies in Japan by the end of 2006. During Q3 of 2006, the game sold a total of 343,000 across Japan, mainland Asia and North America.

Simon Parkin, in an import review for Eurogamer, felt that the sheer number of philosophical and religious elements in the story both stifled any relatable narrative and robbed the characters of any personality; despite this he felt the ending successfully tied up remaining narrative threads from previous games. Famitsu enjoyed the narrative's presentation, but noted the lack of a focused narrative due to the number of story threads needing addressing. GamePro said the story came to an "intriguing conclusion", but felt that the cutscenes were too long. GameSpot's Bethany Massimilla enjoyed the story and character conclusions, but felt that understanding the story and terminology required too much referral to the in-game encyclopedia. Eduardo Vasconcellos of GameSpy found the story long-winded, while IGN's Jeremy Dunham found the narrative to be one of the best aspects of the game. RPGamer's Josh Martz called the story a "triumphant conclusion to Shion's arc of the series". Both Parkin and Massimilla criticized the censoring of blood and its negative effects on the story's more dramatic moments.

Parkin enjoyed the battle system's mechanics, but found the rest of the gameplay "extremely straightforward" due to a lack of complex environments or side activities. GamePro gave high praise to the combat system and lack of random encounters, in addition to calling the mini game "practically its own entire game, and fun, too". Massimilla praised the balanced mechanics of the battle system and customization options. Vasconcellos also enjoyed the customization options available to the player, in addition to the battle system. Dunham enjoyed the combat system and its blending of elements from past games, but was disappointed that no new elements had been added. Martz also enjoyed the varied systems and strategy within combat, despite noting a lack of overall challenge.

Parkin praised the "middle ground" balance in the character designs between the deformed look of Episode I and the realism of Episode II. Famitsu praised the shortened loading times, and GamePro praised the graphics and art design while criticizing the voice acting quality. Massimilla positively noted the game's art design, cutscene animation, and music and sound design. Both Dunham and Martz praised both music and voice acting.

== Legacy ==
Xenosaga Episode III was the last property to be released in the Xenosaga series. Following the release of Episode III, and the mixed reception received by the series as a whole, the entire development team were in a state of low morale. Partly to boost team morale and create a game players would enjoy, the team developed a new RPG for the Wii; originally titled Monado: Beginning of the World, its title was eventually changed to Xenoblade Chronicles. During its development, the team moved away from the narrative and design techniques used for the Xenosaga games, which were considered old-fashioned. The success of Xenoblade Chronicles led to the development of further Xeno titles. In a later interview, Takahashi stated that he would be willing to develop further titles in the Xenosaga series if funding was provided.
