= Xenosaga: Pied Piper =

2004 video game

- Developers: Monolith Soft; Namco; Tom Create
- Publisher: Namco
- Director: Gouda Tsutomu
- Writers: Tetsuya Takahashi; Soraya Saga
- Series: Xenosaga
- Platforms: Vodafone, i-mode
- Release: Vodafone: JP: July 14, 2004; i-mode: JP: July 5, 2006; Nintendo Switch/Steam: JP: April 30, 2026
- Genre: Role-playing
- Mode: Single-player

Xenosaga: Pied Piper (Note: Zenosāga: Paido Paipā (Japanese: ゼノサーガ パイド パイパー)) is a 2004 role-playing video game co-developed by Monolith Soft, Namco, and Tom Create and published by Namco in 2004 for mobile devices. A spin-off of the Xenosaga trilogy and part of the Xeno metaseries, the story follows the human life of cyborg Ziggurat 8—a key character in the Xenosaga trilogy—a century before the events of Xenosaga Episode I. Gameplay follows a similar system to the mainline Xenosaga games, but adapted for mobile devices.

The storyline of Pied Piper was planned from an early stage and was incorporated as a mobile title after Monolith Soft was approached by Namco's mobile division. Originally released through Vodafone Live, it would later be released through NTT Docomo's i-mode. The storyline was written by series creators Tetsuya Takahashi and Soraya Saga; Pied Piper was Saga's last project for the Xenosaga series. The game's title is a reference to the German legend of the Pied Piper of Hamelin.

== Gameplay ==
A battle in Xenosaga: Pied Piper; while adjusted for mobile devices, several mechanics were carried over from the main Xenosaga games.

Similar to the Xenosaga series, Xenosaga: Pied Piper is a role-playing video game in which the player controls a party of characters to progress through environments linked to the main narrative. The player, taking the role of main protagonist Jan Sauer, explores environments from a 2D overhead perspective, with a combination of conversations and cinematic cutscenes advancing the narrative; battles take place in a virtual space tied to the story. Enemies encountered during exploration are fought using a turn-based battle system carrying over mechanics from Xenosaga Episode I; characters can save "Boost" points to interrupt an enemy's turn and perform an early action. Each character has specific actions they are specialized at, such as Jan being skilled with knife-based attacks. Actions include standard attacks and special attacks triggered using points accumulated from death blows dealt to enemies in previous battles.

== Synopsis ==
Pied Piper is set a century before the events of Xenosaga Episode I; taking place 4,000 years in the future, humanity has left Earth and established civilization in another part of the Milky Way galaxy under the rule of the Galaxy Federation. The story follows Federal Police Special Operations member Jan Sauer as he investigates a series of terrorist attacks on the Federation's hyperspace transport network U.M.N. by the mysterious Voyager, whose U.M.N.-based crimes are accompanied by cruel attacks on civilian women and children. As he investigates, Jan navigates sensitive political negotiations between the Federation and the Immigrant Fleet theocracy, who worship an ancient artifact called the Zohar. Jan's investigations reveal Voyager's identity as Erich Webster, a member of their team whose addiction to information led him to search for the godlike entity U-DO. On the verge of death after his Congress contact Dmitri Yuriev stops providing him with the drugs necessary to counter U-DO's influence, Erich manipulates the Immigrant Fleet into communicating with U-DO through the Zohar. Rejected by U-DO, he is granted new life as a being called a Testament by Wilhelm, the immortal CEO of Vector Industries. Having killed everyone close to Jan, including his wife and son, Voyager asks him to choose between eternal life as a Testament or being killed by him; Jan instead shoots himself. Jan is later resurrected as the cyborg Ziggurat 8, playing a key role in the events of the Xenosaga trilogy.

== Development and release ==
The story of Ziggy was always part of series creator Tetsuya Takahashi's plan for the Xenosaga project, but Monolith Soft had yet to decide in what form it should be presented. Takahashi later stated that Ziggy's story was originally part of the planned scenario for Xenosaga Episode II. The team was contacted by the mobile development division of series publisher Namco, asking whether Monolith Soft could work with them on a mobile property, and agreed to the collaboration, using the mobile game to tell Ziggy's story; Namco Mobile developed the game, while Monolith Soft handled story development. External studio Tom Create helped develop the game. The creation of Pied Piper formed part of a move by the newly-established lead developers of Xenosaga to expand the series into other media following the release of Episode I. The game's script was co-written by series creators Tetsuya Takahashi and his wife Soraya Saga. Pied Piper was Saga's last contribution to the Xenosaga series prior to leaving the project in 2005. The game's title is a reference to the German fable of the Pied Piper of Hamelin. Pied Piper was first announced in July 2004. The game was originally published exclusively for Vodafone devices, with a version for NTT Docomo's i-mode service released on 5 July 2006. The third video game release in the Xenosaga series, the game is one of two games to remain exclusive to Japan. A fan-translated video walkthrough was created in 2023. In 2025, a copy of Pied Piper, along with the mobile RPG Lost Chronicle, was found by an anonymous donor and preserved online; an English fan translation is in development.

On April 16, 2026, G-Mode announced in their sixth-anniversary stream that they would re-release the game on Nintendo Switch and Steam under their G-Mode Archives+ label on April 30, 2026.

Chapter	Release date
Chapter 1 (第1章, Dai Isshō)	Part 1: July 14, 2004; Part 2: August 2, 2004
Chapter 2 (第2章, Dai Nishō)	Part 1: September 1, 2004; Part 2: September 15, 2004
Chapter 3 (第3章, Dai Sanshō)	Part 1: October 1, 2004; Part 2: October 13, 2004
