= Xenosaga: The Animation =

2005 Japanese anime series

- Key artwork featuring main protagonists Shion Uzuki and KOS-MOS.

ゼノサーガ THE ANIMATION (Zenosāga: Za Animēshon)
- Genre: Mecha
- Anime television series
- Directed by: Shigeyasu Yamauchi; Tsuyoshi Kouga (chief director)
- Written by: Yuichiro Takeda
- Music by: Kousuke Yamashita
- Studio: Toei Animation
- Licensed by: NA: A.D. Vision (2007–2008) Funimation Entertainment (2008–present)
- Original network: TV Asahi
- English network: US: Anime Network
- Original run: January 5, 2005 – March 23, 2005
- Episodes: 12

Xenosaga: The Animation (Japanese: ゼノサーガ THE ANIMATION, Hepburn: Zenosāga: Za Animēshon) is a mecha anime produced by Toei Animation. The 12-episode series ran from January to March 2005 on TV Asahi, while it was licensed for release on DVD overseas first by A.D. Vision and later by Funimation Entertainment. The anime is based on the narrative of Xenosaga Episode I, a role-playing game for the PlayStation 2 developed by Monolith Soft and published by Namco. Set 5000 years in the future, it tells of the adventures of scientist Shion Uzuki and the battle android KOS-MOS as they fight the threat of the alien Gnosis.

The anime was created mostly without the involvement of Namco following the success of the first game, though any new characters were created with Namco's permission. The characters were redrawn for the anime by Nobuteru Yūki, while the script was written by Yuichiro Takeda. The music, composed by Kousuke Yamashita, was designed to emulate the original game's orchestral score. The anime has received mixed to positive reviews from journalists, with many commenting that only those familiar in the game would understand it. Both Yamashita and Takeda were later involved in the production of Xenosaga I & II, a Nintendo DS re-imagining of the first game and its direct sequel.

== Plot ==
The story of Xenosaga: The Animation is based on the narrative of Xenosaga Episode I, a game developed for the PlayStation 2 by Monolith Soft and Namco. Set in a science fiction reality thousands of years in the future, humanity lives in multiple planets forming the Galaxy Federation after being forced to abandon Earth following a disaster tied to a mystical artifact called the Zohar; Earth has since become known as Lost Jerusalem. Humanity has come under attack from a hostile alien race called the Gnosis, which is immune to normal weapons. The narrative follows Shion Uzuki, a scientist working for Vector Industries, and the anti-Gnosis battle android KOS-MOS. The two are driven from their ship the Woglinde by a Gnosis attack triggered after the Woglinde picked up the Zohar. The anime roughly follows the plot of Episode I, although some events are altered or condensed.

== Production ==
An anime adaptation of Xenosaga was initially unplanned, but after the game's commercial success worldwide, an anime adaptation was commissioned. The anime was produced by Toei Animation, in association with TV Asahi and under supervision from Namco and the Xenosaga production team. The series was directed by Tsuyoshi Koga and co-produced by Satoko Matsuda and Takao Yoshizawa. The supervising director was Shigeyasu Yamauchi, who had acted as a director for the Ojamajo Doremi and Saint Seiya series. The script was written by Yuichiro Takeda, an anime scriptwriter who had worked on Banner of the Stars and The King of Braves GaoGaiGar. Character designs were handled by Nobuteru Yūki, whose previous work included Record of Lodoss War. Mech designs were created by Hiroyuki Taiga, who had worked on Beast Wars: Transformers. The character designs were meant to emulate the artstyle of Episode I while adjusting them to be distinct from the originals.

No staff from the original game's production were involved in creating the anime. While all the original characters were included, some original characters were created and incorporated by Toei under approval from the game's developers. Due to the twelve-episode run, some elements of the plot of Xenosaga Episode I needed to be altered, or were changed by the staff of the anime as long as they did not stray too far from the source material. Some aspects were also incorporated based on future developments in Xenosaga Episode II. Character roles were shifted around, such as Shion's brother Jin Uzuki being introduced and featured in a larger role, and supporting character Luis Virgil being given a much larger role in the overall narrative. Other minor characters such as Miyuki were removed entirely. A major scene from the game, the discovery of the Zohar on Earth, was left out of the anime. Despite this, the policy was to keep in as much of the original game's plot and scenes as possible, right down to the unresolved mysteries presented in the game.

The anime's soundtrack was composed by Kousuke Yamashita, who had notably worked on the Nobunaga's Ambition series. To emulate the original orchestral soundtrack of the game, the anime's soundtrack featured a full orchestra, with an orchestrated opening. The ending theme, "In This Serenity" performed by Mayumi Gojo, was written by Yamashita and lyrics by Roland Lennox. Like the rest of the score, the ending theme was performed using a full orchestra. The original game's Japanese cast, including Ai Maeda as Shion and Mariko Suzuki as KOS-MOS, reprised their roles for the anime. Maeda found returning to the scenario of Episode I an unnerving experience due to the passage of time and the need to recapture her performance. Suzuki found returning to the scenario nostalgic, enjoying the faster pace of work in relation to the anime's style. Japanese dubbing began in December 2004, a month before the series began broadcasting.

== Release ==
Xenosaga: The Animation was first announced in November 2004. The anime was broadcast on TV Asahi during the channel's late night slot between January 5 and March 23, 2005. Following the anime's broadcast, it was released across six DVD volumes between April and September 2005. Also released were an original soundtrack album in March, and an art book containing artwork and staff interviews related to the series. The anime was first licensed and dubbed for North America by A.D. Vision in 2007. The series originally premiered on Anime Network on August 30, 2007. The rights to the anime's Western distribution was later picked up by Funimation Entertainment in 2008 as one of many anime licenses acquired from ADV's parent company. The anime was made available in dubbed and subtitled form through Funimation's site starting in 2009, and all episodes were released in DVD as Xenosaga Complete Series S.A.V.E. on September 13, 2011.

== Reception ==
The anime received generally mixed to positive reviews from critics. In his review of the first English DVD release for Newtype USA, Kevin Gifford said; "If you're a Xenosaga player, you'll probably get more out of this show (which skips a lot of the games' exposition out of necessity) than someone unfamiliar with the basic plot—but it's precisely those gamers who might have a few issues with the new designs and compressed storyline.".

== Legacy ==
Following the end of production on the anime, Takeda was asked by series creator Tetsuya Takahashi to write the script for Xenosaga I & II, a re-imagining of the first two Xenosaga games for the Nintendo DS. Multiple staff involved in the anime's production, including Yamashita, were involved in the game's production. Xenosaga I & II released on March 30, 2006.
