= Xenosaga Episode II =

2004 video game

- North American cover art
- Developer: Monolith Soft
- Publishers: WW: Namco; EU: Sony Computer Entertainment
- Director: Koh Arai
- Producer: Tomohiro Hagiwara
- Designer: Norihiro Takami
- Programmer: Toshiaki Yajima
- Artists: Kouichi Mugitani; Junya Ishigaki; Norihiro Takami
- Writers: Norihiko Yonesaka; Tetsuya Takahashi; Soraya Saga
- Composers: Yuki Kajiura; Shinji Hosoe; Ayako Saso
- Series: Xenosaga
- Platform: PlayStation 2
- Release: JP: June 24, 2004; NA: February 15, 2005; PAL: November 4, 2005
- Genre: Role-playing
- Mode: Single-player

Xenosaga Episode II: Jenseits von Gut und Böse (Note: Zenosāga Episōdo Tsū: Zen'aku no Higan (Japanese: ゼノサーガ エピソードII 善悪の彼岸)) is a 2004 role-playing video game developed by Monolith Soft for the PlayStation 2. It was published in Japan (2004) and North America (2005) by Namco, and in Europe by Sony Computer Entertainment Europe (2005). It is the second entry in the Xenosaga trilogy, and forms part of the wider Xeno metaseries. Continuing directly from the events of Xenosaga Episode I, Xenosaga Episode II sees protagonists Shion Uzuki and Jr. continuing to combat the plots of the U-TIC Organization and the insane Albedo Piazzolla. Gameplay is carried over from the first game, featuring exploration of environments through a linear narrative, while battles follow a turn-based system featuring a system of button combinations, multiple leveling systems, and combat featuring both the characters on foot and piloting large mecha called "E.S.".

Development of Xenosaga Episode II began following the completion of Episode I. Series creator Tetsuya Takahashi gave control of the Xenosaga series to a new development team, resulting in a number of changes. The gameplay system was redesigned based on feedback from Episode I. The scenario, written by Norihiko Yonesaka, was based on the original draft by Takahashi and Soraya Saga, with Episode II being Saga's last contribution to the main trilogy. The music was composed by Yuki Kajiura and Shinji Hosoe, who worked separately on the cinematic and gameplay soundtracks respectively.

Upon release, the game received praise from critics, with the majority of criticism going towards some of its altered gameplay mechanics. Despite strong sales in both Japan and North America, it failed to meet projected sales targets. Alongside Episode II, the staff expanded the Xenosaga series into other projects. A portion of the planned Xenosaga narrative by Takahashi and Saga was made into Xenosaga: Pied Piper, released in 2004 for mobile devices. The game was remade along with Episode I as part of Xenosaga I & II for the Nintendo DS. The final Xenosaga game, Xenosaga Episode III, was released in 2006.

== Gameplay ==
A battle in Xenosaga Episode II, featuring main character KOS-MOS performing a "Boost" move

Xenosaga Episode II is a role-playing video game; the player controls a party of characters that expands during the course of the game, navigating them through a variety of environments tied to the progression of the story. Gameplay segments are separated by story sequences, which are told mainly through traditional full-motion cutscenes. Exploring environments, the party can collect a variety of items from destroying objects; some items can be used in gameplay to boost a character's statistics or restore health. Most areas can be navigated on foot, but some require the use of mechs. In addition to the main campaign, the party can engage in side quests which vary from finding items to completing difficult battles, and unlock optional dungeon environments in which players can fight enemies and obtain rare items.

During navigation, the party can see enemy units in the field, choosing whether or not to engage them. When an encounter is triggered, the party and enemy fights in a dedicated arena. The combat is governed by a turn-based battle system. Any of the three-member player party can be swapped out in battle at the cost of a turn. Each character has access to melee and ranged standard attacks, and can use items to affect the party or enemies. The player party's attacks are determined through button combinations, with different combinations triggering different attack sequences that can have secondary effects on the party and neighboring enemies. Actions taken by characters are governed by their available Stocks, which can be saved using the "Stock" option in battle.

A character can perform a special attack with their accumulated Stocks, with some "Boost" attacks ignoring turn order to allow a character who has yet to move to steal an enemy's turn and perform an action. A character's position on the battlefield can be shifted, which directly affects what attacks they perform and how they interact with neighboring party members. Characters have three level of attacks; A (high), B (mid) and C (low). Each enemy is vulnerable to a particular sequence of attacks. Upon completing a sequence of attacks an enemy is weak to, the enemy is knocked out, rendering them unable to move. When knocked out, a party member can perform a special attack which deals high damage. Two characters can also cooperate on a Dual attack, which deals high damage to enemies.

In addition to battling on foot, mecha specific to a character can be summoned. While each mech has a fixed main pilot, the sub-pilot can be changed, which alters the types of attacks the mech can perform. After defeating the enemy, the party receives experience points which raise their basic statistics, and skill points which are used to upgrade each character's skill tree, unlocking new skills. New items and accessories can only be gathered either through searching the environment or defeating enemies, as currency and shops are not present.

== Synopsis ==
=== Setting ===
Like its predecessor, Xenosaga Episode II takes place in a universe based around science fiction. In the year "20XX", the Zohar—an artifact dating from the beginning of the universe which connects to the realm of a god-like energy dubbed U-DO—was unearthed by an archeological expedition in Kenya; the Zohar is key to enabling humanity to travel in space beyond the Solar System. Over 4,000 years in the future, humanity has left Earth behind to colonize the galaxy following a terrible event. This resulted in Earth's location being lost and the planet being dubbed "Lost Jerusalem"; by the game's events, humanity has adopted a new calendar system dubbed "Transcend Christ" (T.C.), with the game's events taking place in T.C. 4767—equivalent to A.D. 7277. Humanity is now spread across 500,000 planets, with their governments forming the Galaxy Federation. Planets are connected through a time warp travel network called the Unus Mundus Network (U.M.N.). The U.M.N. is managed by Vector Industries, which also controls interests in the Federation's military. Existing alongside humans are Realians, synthetic humans who hold equal status with natural humans. The Federation has come under attack from an ancient alien race called the Gnosis, which begin decimating Federation worlds. As normal weapons are ineffective against them, Vector develops two different weapon systems designed to fight them: humanoid mecha dubbed AGWS (Anti Gnosis Weapon System), and the similar but more powerful KOS-MOS battle androids. There also exist more advanced AGWS models called E.S., powered by Lost Jerusalem artifacts called Vessels of Anima. Important organizations include the Kukai Foundation, a group that acts as a shelter for enhanced humans; the U-TIC Organization, a once-scientific group that now wishes to gain control of the Zohar; and Ormus, a secretive cult who worship Lost Jerusalem which secretly funds U-TIC and operations through a political faction called the Immigrant Fleet.

A key episode in the game's backstory is the Miltian Conflict, which occurred fourteen years before the events of Episode I on the planet Miltia; beginning due to a war between U-TIC and the Federation, it escalated due to a group of Realians going berserk and attacking people indiscriminately. The planet of Miltia was lost in a space-time anomaly when an experiment involving U.R.T.Vs—an army of 669 genetically modified children designed to combat U-DO's energies—goes horribly wrong. Following the apparent destruction of Miltia, new settlements and a new government are established on a neighboring planet named Second Miltia. During the events of Episode I, main protagonist Shion Uzuki and her creation the anti-Gnosis android prototype KOS-MOS are forced to escape a Gnosis attack triggered by the discovery of a Zohar Emulator. During their journey to Second Miltia aboard the passenger freighter Elsa, they are pursued by U-TIC forces; encounter more Gnosis seeking the Zohar Emulator; and Shion experiences visions of a young girl named Nephilim and a deceased friend Febronia, the latter of whom asks her to "free" her sisters Cecily and Cathe. Sheltering with the Kukai Foundation, they are eventually forced to confront Albedo Piazzolla, an unhinged U.R.T.V. determined to reach Miltia, when he threatens Second Miltia with a powerful weapon called the Proto Merkabah. The group destroy the Proto Merkabah, but Albedo escapes with data that could lead the way to Miltia. Episode II picks up immediately after the ending of Episode I, when the Elsa arrives on Second Miltia.

=== Characters ===
The main protagonists are Shion Uzuki, a scientist for Vector Industries; and Jr., a U.R.T.V. survivor of the U-DO experiment who runs the Kukai Foundation with his brother Gaignun. The main party includes Jin Uzuki, Shion's estranged brother; KOS-MOS, a prototype anti-Gnosis battle android; chaos, a melancholy young man with mysterious powers; MOMO, a prototype Realian created by U-TIC scientist Joachim Mizrahi and modeled after his dead daughter; Ziggy—short for Ziggurat 8—a cyborg who acts as MOMO's guardian; and Canaan, a combat Realian who worked with chaos during the Miltian Conflict. Other characters include Allen Ridgeley, a co-worker of Shion; main antagonist Albedo Piazzolla, the insane brother of Jr. and Gaignun; Margulis, a high-ranking officer in U-TIC; Sergius, the apparent leader of both Ormus and the Immigrant Fleet; Dmitri Yuriev, creator and biological father of the U.R.T.Vs; Wilhelm, CEO of Vector; and Nephilim, a young girl who appears to Shion in visions.

=== Plot ===
Episode II begins fourteen years prior to the opening of Episode I during the Miltian Conflict. Canaan and chaos are sent to investigate, discovering that Realians are being driven insane by the "Song of Nephilim", a harmony that affects the mind. They are saved from an ambush by Jin, who has stolen data implicating the people using the Song. After fending off an attack by Margulis that leaves Margulis scarred, Jin transfers the data into Canaan's mind to keep it safe. Fourteen years later, the data remains locked, with the key to unlocking it still being on Miltia. Now based on Second Miltia, Canaan is assigned to protect the crew of the Elsa following their arrival. Upon arrival, Shion reluctantly hands KOS-MOS over to Vector officials while instructing Allen to keep an eye on her, while Ziggy prepares to escort MOMO to have the data implanted by Joachim Mizrahi retrieved. During her stay, Shion receives a vision from Nephilim, asking her to help Cecily and Cathe as she promised.

While on Second Miltia, MOMO, Ziggy, chaos and Jr. are attacked by U-TIC agents in powerful mechs, only being saved by Canaan's intervention. Shion meanwhile has an uncomfortable reunion with Jin, as she blames his absence for the deaths of their parents during the Miltian Conflict. In the hours leading up to MOMO's scan, both Jr. and his brother Gaignun are telepathically tormented by Albedo, who still cannot decode the data he stole from MOMO. During the procedure, a virus implanted in MOMO by Albedo activates, and MOMO fragments her own personality to keep Mizrahi's data secure. Shion Jr. and the rest of the group enter MOMO's subconscious to save her. During this period, Jr. reveals that he and his brothers were part of an experiment by Dmitri Yuriev: Yuriev's wish was to create an existence which would neutralize U-DO. The three were close, but Albedo became despondent when he discovered his ability to survive any injury was unique to him, meaning he could outlive his brothers. During an experiment, Jr. broke the circuit containing a portion of U-DO, resulting in everyone except himself, Albedo and Gaignun being killed. Albedo was touched by U-DO and went insane, while Gaignun remained unaffected. As they save MOMO, Albedo hacks in and tricks MOMO into releasing the decoded data to him. Using the data, Albedo opens the way to Miltia.

With Miltia accessible, the Federation, U-TIC, and the Immigrant Fleet fight each other for control of the Zohar hidden on the planet. Shion and Allen attempt to reach Miltia, but are almost destroyed by U-TIC forces and only saved due to KOS-MOS's spontaneous activation and intervention. With help from Gaignun and the Second Miltia government, the group then launch an assault with the Elsa, destroying the Immigrant Fleet mothership before being rescued by Gaignun as the space-time distortion around Miltia vanishes. Joined by Jin and Canaan, they unlock the data within Canaan, revealing that the Immigrant Fleet has funded U-TIC since its inception, and that MOMO's father Mizrahi sacrificed himself to seal Miltia away after Albedo released the U-DO energy. After a skirmish with Margulis, the group find the Zohar and two deformed comatose Realians used to control its energy: these are Cecily and Cathe. Shion reluctantly allows KOS-MOS to kill Cecily and Cathe. The Zohar is claimed by Sergius on behalf of Ormus and the Immigrant Fleet. He installs the Zohar into the Proto Omega, a giant machine built within the structure of Miltia, with the intent of destroying the Gnosis and Federation so Ormus will be free to rediscover Lost Jerusalem. Shion's group escape on the Elsa as the Proto Omega activates, destroying both Miltia and the surrounding armies of the Federation and Ormus.

As the group launch an assault on the Proto Omega, Gaignun—who had previously killed Yuriev after refusing to kill Jr. as ordered—is possessed by the spirit of Yuriev, who takes over the Federation government and launches his own attack on the Proto Omega. When the group face Sergius, they are aided by Albedo, but Albedo is apparently killed by Sergius. After their battle, Sergius is killed by a group of cloaked men dubbed the "Testaments" due to exceeding his role in their plans. The Testaments then resurrect Albedo and give him control of the Zohar, which immediately unleashes U-DO's energy. Jr. is forced to kill Albedo, dispersing the U-DO energy, but is comforted by Nephilim. Before the Zohar can be retrieved, a massive ship dubbed "Abel's Ark" appears and absorbs the Zohar. Wilhelm, who has been observing events, speaks telepathically with chaos while calling him "Yeshua", praising his decision to become an active player in events. In a post-credits scene, Wilhelm confers with the Testaments about recent events while welcoming a new white-cloaked member.

== Development ==
Following the release of Episode I in 2002, the Xenosaga project was reevaluated and staff reshuffled to allow newer staff members a chance to handle the series. Series creator and Monolith Soft co-founder Tetsuya Takahashi stepped down as director, taking on other responsibilities within the company in addition to being given wider creative input on projects. Takahashi's explanation was that he did not want to limit the scope and direction of the Xenosaga series, and that his style of direction as seen for Episode I could result in the development period becoming extended exponentially. During this period the Xenosaga series, originally planned by Takahashi as a six-part series, was rearranged into a trilogy, with the possibility of further episodes should the series meet continued success. The new director was Koh Arai, while Tomohiro Hagiwara became lead producer, both of whom had worked on Episode I in minor roles; Takahashi on an executive role overseeing Episode II, in addition to keeping the staff informed with the lore of Xenosaga.

Development on Episode II took approximately two years, worked on by a staff of 60 to 100 people. The staff was divided into three teams; "scene", "battle" and "quest". During production, Hagiwara and the other new staff aimed to turn Xenosaga into an evolving series rather than a static one. The gameplay was mainly carried over from Episode I, but with adjustments and additions designed to streamline the system and increase playability. The battle system was adjusted based on feedback that the first game's battle system was too complicated. The art director for the game was Norihiro Takami. While the character designs of Episode I were stylized, the cast were redesigned for Episode II to appear much more realistic. This was done to increase the expressiveness of the characters during cutscenes. The graphics engine was completely rebuilt for the second game. The new E.S. mecha were designed by Kouichi Mugitani and Junya Ishigaki; each wanted to emulate the design choices of Episode I while also creating something unique to Episode II. Mugitani also resumed his role from Episode I as production designer.

The concept and scenario draft was written by Takahashi and his wife Soraya Saga. Episode II was the last main Xenosaga game worked on by Saga prior to her leaving the project in 2005. Their draft was then turned into the game's full script by Norihiko Yonesaka, who was allowed by Takahashi to handle the storyline of the Xenosaga series following Episode I using his extensive notes. According to Takahashi, Yonesaka's role was to take his and Saga's notes and turn them into a workable game script, something which required parts of the planned scenario to be condensed or cut. According to Arai, the changes were made in consultation with Takahashi, with them treating his plan as a novel and the game as its movie adaptation. In a later interview, Saga said the changes made to the overall scenario for Episode II resulted in subsequent changes to the planned Xenosaga plotline. The game's subtitle is taken from the native title of Beyond Good and Evil, a novel written by German philosopher Friedrich Nietzsche. The use of Nietzsche's works and concepts was a recurring element in the series; in the context of Episode II, the subtitle was said to represent the blurring of boundaries between concepts of right and wrong, in addition to symbolizing the complex relations between Jr. and Albedo. As with the other Xenosaga titles, the game made heavy use of Biblical mythology.

Xenosaga Episode II was first announced in July 2003 during a special event dedicated to the productions of Monolith Soft. It was announced alongside the international version of the first game Xenosaga Episode I Reloaded, and the company's new title Baten Kaitos: Eternal Wings and the Lost Ocean. The game was released by Namco in Japan on June 24, 2004. The game was first shown off internationally at the 2004 Electronic Entertainment Expo, with its release window being announced by Namco in August of that year. Episode II was released in North America on February 15, 2005. The game was localized by Namco's internal localization department. Dubbing was handled by Cup of Tea Productions; Xenosaga Episode II was the company's very first project. For Episode II, several actors were recast including the voice actress for KOS-MOS. While Episode I was not released in Europe, Namco partnered with Sony Computer Entertainment Europe to release Episode II on November 4, 2005. A Special Edition exclusive to Europe released alongside the normal version, containing a movie DVD detailing the events leading up to Episode II. It is the only Xenosaga title to be released in the region.

=== Music ===
The music for Xenosaga Episode II was composed by Yuki Kajiura and Shinji Hosoe. The two worked respectively on the cinematic and gameplay tracks; they did not collaborate on any tracks, or even meet during the game's production. The original game's composer Yasunori Mitsuda refused to return to the series due to both a busy schedule and a clash of interests with Namco over the direction of the game. Hosoe, whose previous work included Street Fighter EX and the Ridge Racer series, was forced to greatly restrict his compositions' quality due to working with the limited sound hardware on the PS2. He felt that both the sound quality and overall direction of the soundtrack were faulted because of this. Kajiura, whose previous work consisted mostly of anime scores, felt that the game's soundtrack was different from her earlier work due to the different pieces linking with each other, although some tracks were split up by the production team when she composed them to merge as a single melody. She also found it easier working from Mitsuda's rather than creating a completely original score. The realistic art design also influenced Kajiura's work, as she wished to complement it. Aside from the English ending theme, the song lyrics were written and performed in a made-up language jokingly referred to by the choir as "Yukilish". Another composer was Ayako Saso, who was credited in an interview as a co-composer and in-game as a sound designer. Saso worked with Hosoe on the quest and battle tracks as part of the team from SuperSweep. She played the original Xenosaga as a reference, with her contributions taking around a year to create. Kajura's compositions were released on a two-disc album in July 2004, while some of Hosoe's music was released on a promotional disc as part of the North American strategy guide. The rest of Hosoe's music for the game has yet to receive an album release.

== Reception ==
Reception

Aggregate score
Aggregator	Score
Metacritic	73/100 (45 reviews)

Review scores
Publication	Score
Eurogamer	7/10
Famitsu	33/40
GamePro	4/5
GameSpot	7.8/10
GameSpy	3.5/5
IGN	7.9/10

During its first week on sale in Japan, Xenosaga Episode II reached second place in gaming charts, selling around 186,000 units. The following week the game dropped to the third place with further sales of over 32,000 units, contributing to a general decline in game sales during that period. Within two weeks of its release, the game had sold nearly 219,000 units in Japan. According to Namco's fiscal report in February 2005, the game had sold 280,000 units in Japan by that time. According to their later 2005 fiscal year report, Episode II was one of Namco's better-selling titles in North America, although no exact sales figures were given. According to a later report, Episode II underperformed commercially, reaching just over 50% of Namco's projected sales target.

Japanese magazine Famitsu felt that the characters and world view was enjoyable, but felt that some scenes were "forced" and the cutscenes ran too long. Simon Parkin of Eurogamer praised its characters and plot, but found the story uncomfortably long and complicated, requiring too much foreknowledge of the original game to be enjoyable for series newcomers. GamePro, while noting that the cinematics might be too long for some, enjoyed the story and its continuation of the first game's narrative. Bethany Massimilla of GameSpot enjoyed both the narrative and its focus on the cast, and GameSpy's Christian Nutt praised the narrative's revelations despite pacing issues and a lack of meaningful progress with the overarching narrative. Jeremy Dunham of IGN found the shift from Shion to Jr.'s narrative to be jarring, but generally enjoyed the overarching narrative and the new characters.

Parkin noted that the character models were "sexed-up" from the previous game, while GamePro generally praised the overhaul to the game's graphics and character design. Massimilla praised the more realistic character designs and polished visuals. Dunham noted that the increased visual quality and redone character designs helped in the game's presentation, though he found the soundtrack lacking when measured against the first game's score. He also criticized the replacement of some characters' English voices.

Famitsu enjoyed the higher speed of battle compared to Episode I. Parkin echoed these sentiments while also noted how mechanics such as Boost and the addition of side quest content made the game better than its predecessor. GamePro positively noted that the first game's mechanics had been made more approachable for series newcomers, while Massimilla felt that the simplified nature of the character growth system brought down the experience in addition to being shorter than other RPGs available at the time. Nutt felt that the alterations made battles far more enjoyable despite the character growth system lacking any meaningful customization options. Dunham echoed other reviewers' opinions on both the upgrades to battle and the reworked character progression system, in addition to the lack of in-game currency to buy items.

== Legacy ==
Development of Xenosaga Episode III began while work was finishing on Episode II. While the team were open to further entries based on the game's commercial performance, it was designed to be the last entry in the series. Arai and Yonesaka returned respectively as director and scriptwriter. Takahashi provided the scenario draft and supervised the writing. Episode III released in 2006 in Japan and North America. Episode III was the last game released in the Xenosaga series.

A part of the planned narrative for Episode II was incorporated into Xenosaga: Pied Piper. Released in July 2004 for mobile devices, the game was co-developed by Monolith Soft, Namco Mobile and Tom Create as part of a move to make Xenosaga a multimedia franchise accessing a wide audience. Both Episode II and Episode I were remade for the Nintendo DS as Xenosaga I & II, released in March 2006. Co-developed by Monolith Soft and Tom Create, the scenario was supervised by Takahashi and included material which needed to be cut from the original releases of the first two Xenosaga games. Both Pied Piper and Xenosaga I & II remain exclusive to Japan.
