= Xenosaga Episode I =

2002 video game

- North American box art featuring one of the main characters KOS-MOS
- Developer: Monolith Soft
- Publisher: Namco
- Director: Tetsuya Takahashi
- Producer: Hirohide Sugiura
- Artists: Kunihiko Tanaka; Kouichi Mugitani; Junya Ishigaki; Yasuyuki Honne
- Writers: Tetsuya Takahashi; Soraya Saga
- Composer: Yasunori Mitsuda
- Series: Xenosaga
- Platform: PlayStation 2
- Release: JP: February 28, 2002; NA: February 25, 2003
- Genre: Role-playing
- Mode: Single-player

Xenosaga Episode I: Der Wille zur Macht (Note: Zenosāga Episōdo Wan: Chikara e no Ishi (Japanese: ゼノサーガ エピソードI 力への意志), the international title "Der Wille zur Macht" is German for "the will for power") is a role-playing video game developed by Monolith Soft and published by Namco for the PlayStation 2; the game was released in 2002 in Japan and 2003 in North America. It is the first entry in the Xenosaga trilogy and forms part of the wider Xeno metaseries. Gameplay features exploration of environments through a linear narrative, while battles use turn-based combat with the player characters fighting both on foot and piloting large mecha dubbed A.G.W.S.; in turn, combat features a system of button combinations for attack types, and multiple leveling systems.

Set far in the future when humanity has left Earth, the plot follows Shion Uzuki, an employee of Vector Industries; and KOS-MOS, a battle android designed to fight the hostile alien Gnosis. Forced to escape a Gnosis attack and head for the planet of Second Miltia, Shion and KOS-MOS are pulled into a fight between the Galaxy Federation and the hostile U-TIC Organization. With others who join them as they head to safety, they face a deeper mystery surrounding U-TIC's goals and the plans of the immortal Albedo Piazzolla.

Development began in 2000 under the codename "Project X" following the founding of Monolith Soft. Intended as a spiritual successor to the 1998 video game Xenogears, multiple staff were carried over including director and co-writer Tetsuya Takahashi, co-writer Soraya Saga, character designer Kunihiko Tanaka, and composer Yasunori Mitsuda. The game received generally positive reviews from critics and sold over one million copies worldwide. Its direct sequel, Xenosaga Episode II, was released in 2004 in Japan and 2005 overseas. The final Xenosaga game, Xenosaga Episode III, was released in 2006. The game received an anime adaptation which aired in 2005, and was re-imagined along with Episode II as part of Xenosaga I & II for the Nintendo DS.

== Gameplay ==
A battle in Xenosaga Episode I; the party faces off against a group of enemies, with one performing a special ability.

Xenosaga Episode I is a role-playing video game; the player controls a party of characters, navigating them through a variety of environments tied to the progression of the story. Gameplay segments are separated by story sequences told mainly through traditional full-motion cutscenes. Exploring environments, the party can collect a variety of items, some of which can be used in gameplay to boost a character's statistics or restore health. During the course of the game, a database is unlocked that documents the game's story events and terminology. The player can access several mini-game "plug-in" systems through Shion's portable console, and an e-mail system that allows players to make playful decisions that have little significance to the main plot. The console can also be used to access to cleared areas of the game; these grant access to side quests separate from the main storyline.

While navigating environments, enemies are visible within the environment, with engagement being optional. If the player chooses to engage, some environmental elements such as combustible objects can be used to alter an enemy's statistics and grant the player an advantage in battle. When battle begins, the three-character player party and the enemy party fight in a dedicated combat arena. The combat is governed by a turn-based battle system. Each character has access to melee and ranged standard attacks, can use items to affect the party or enemies, and guard against attacks. The player party's attacks are determined through button combinations, with different combinations triggering different attack sequences that can have secondary effects on the party and neighboring enemies. Attack combinations can be customized by the player between battles.

Each attack uses Action Points (AP), with AP remaining after each turn carried over to the next turn. Special moves for each character are unlocked by building up AP over several turns. When a minimum of three AP are available, a character can perform an exclusive action which deals high damage to their opponent. More powerful attacks can be performed with higher amounts of AP. In addition, characters can perform Ether moves, powerful attacks and support actions which drain their Ether Points (EP). Both player and some enemy party members also have a "Boost" meter, which when full allows that character to perform an additional action while taking away an opponent's turn.

The party has access to mecha, which can be equipped by surrendering a turn. Mecha have their own set of moves and boast more powerful attacks than the main party, but also carry over damage between battles. Following the victory, the party is awarded with in-game currency which can be used to purchase items and accessories at shops. The party is also awarded experience points which raise a character's experience level, along with a variety of skill points. These are divided into EP to fuel Ether abilities, along with Skill Points (SP) and Tech Points (TP). SP are assigned to activate passive effects drawn from different accessories, while Tech Points raise the effectiveness and power of Tech attacks unlocked as the character's experience level rises.

== Synopsis ==
=== Setting ===
Xenosaga Episode I takes place in a universe based around science fiction. In the year "20XX", the Zohar—an artifact dating from the beginning of the universe which connects to the realm of a god-like energy dubbed U-DO—was unearthed by an archeological expedition in Kenya; the Zohar is key to enabling humanity to travel in space beyond the Solar System. Over 4,000 years in the future, humanity has left Earth behind to colonize the galaxy following a terrible event. This resulted in Earth's location being lost and the planet being dubbed "Lost Jerusalem"; by the game's events, humanity has adopted a new calendar system dubbed "Transcend Christ" (T.C.), with the game's events taking place in T.C. 4767—equivalent to A.D. 7277. Humanity is now spread across 500,000 planets, with their governments forming the Galaxy Federation. Planets are connected through a time warp travel network called the Unus Mundus Network (U.M.N.). The U.M.N. is managed by Vector Industries, which also controls interests in the Federation's military. Existing alongside humans are Realians, synthetic humans who hold equal status with natural humans. The Federation has come under attack from the ancient alien Gnosis, which begin decimating Federation worlds. As normal weapons are ineffective against them, Vector develops two different weapon systems designed to fight them: humanoid mecha dubbed A.G.W.S. (Anti Gnosis Weapon System), and the similar but more powerful KOS-MOS battle androids. Another hostile faction is the U-TIC Organization, a once-scientific group that now wishes to gain control of the Zohar. A key episode in the game's backstory is the Miltian Conflict, a war between U-TIC and the Federation which triggered the Gnosis' arrival and caused Miltia to be swallowed in a space-time anomaly.

=== Characters ===
The main characters are Shion Uzuki, a human scientist employed by Vector Industries, and her creation the prototype anti-Gnosis battle android KOS-MOS. She is assisted on the project by Allen Ridgeley, and during her time on the Federation ship Woglinde interacts with Federation officers Andrew Cherenkov and Luis Virgil. As the story progresses, Shion and KOS-MOS meet the crew of the passenger freighter Elsa, a ship associated with the Kukai Foundation run by Gaignun Kukai and "Jr.", the latter captaining the Durandal; both Gaignun and Jr. are artificial beings dubbed U.R.T.Vs, with Jr.'s gifts meaning his body has not aged beyond childhood. Among the crew of the Elsa is chaos, a melancholy young man with a mysterious past. The group are joined by the cyborg Ziggy—short for "Ziggurat 8"—and the prototype Realian MOMO. The main antagonists are Margulis, the leader of the U-TIC Organization; and Albedo Piazzolla, Jr. and Gaignun's brother. Events are monitored by Wilheim, CEO of Vector; and Nephilim, a young girl connected to the Zohar.

=== Plot ===
Shion is running final tests on KOS-MOS aboard the Woglinde when the crew retrieve a Zohar Emulator, one of thirteen replicas of the Zohar. Cherenkov monitors Shion's progress, but is also a U-TIC spy furthering their goal of finding the original Zohar. Following the Zohar Emulator's retrieval, the Woglinde is attacked by Gnosis. KOS-MOS self-activates and protects Shion's team, in the process killing Virgil with friendly fire to save Shion and Allen. KOS-MOS brings them and Cherenkov on board the Elsa, which is heading to their destination of Second Miltia. When a Gnosis attacks, chaos' ability to dispel them saves Cherenkov's life. The attack begins mutating Cherenkov, tormenting him with visions of his past as a soldier who failed to adjust to civilian life and killed many people including his wife. During these periods, Shion becomes concerned about KOS-MOS's behavior, and Allen worries about Shion's emotional state. Alongside these events, the cyborg Ziggy is dispatched to rescue the Realian MOMO from U-TIC, as data stored inside her could open the way to the original planet Miltia, lost in a disaster for which her creator Joachim Mizrahi is blamed. Ziggy rescues MOMO and narrowly escapes, fending off attacks by Margulis. Albedo, who is working with U-TIC for his own goals, sets out in pursuit of MOMO.

The Elsa is pulled out of hyperspace and swallowed by a giant Gnosis. During their attempts to escape Cherenkov transforms into a Gnosis. The group are forced to kill the transformed Cherenkov before escaping on the Elsa and being rescued by Jr.. During the subsequent battle, KOS-MOS activates previously-unseen weaponry and absorbs the attacking Gnosis. While traveling with Jr., the group learn that the Kukai Foundation are gathering and storing the Zohar Emulators created by Mizrahi. Meanwhile, U-TIC uses agents within the Federation to doctor footage of Jr.'s battle with U-TIC and implicate the group in the destruction of the Woglinde. The group travel to the Kukai Foundation base above Second Miltia, operated by Jr.'s brother Gaignun. They are subsequently held hostage by Federation troops due to U-TIC's influence. With help from an ally of Gaignun, the group retrieve evidence from within KOS-MOS's memory center which can exonerate them.

While inside KOS-MOS's memory, the group are guided through a dream-like realm constructed from their repressed bad memories, all the way observed by Nephilim, with whom chaos is acquainted. Shion also meets a vision of Febronia, a Realian woman killed in the Miltian Conflict, who asks Shion to "free" her sisters Cecily and Cathe for the sake of both humans and Realians. Before fulfilling their mission, Nephilim tells them that KOS-MOS was designed to stop the energies of U-DO from entering their reality, an event which caused the original planet Miltia to vanish into a space-time void and could potentially destroy the universe. Due to surviving a Gnosis encounter and remaining human, Shion has the capacity to change the future for the better. During these events, Albedo captures and psychologically tortures MOMO before triggering the "Song of Nephilim", a song which attracts swarms of Gnosis.

The Federation fleet try to destroy the Kukai base as it appears to be the source of the Song, but Wilhelm—who has been secretly observing events—arrives with a private fleet that destroys the Gnosis and protects the base. KOS-MOS then uses an advanced weapon to detect the Song's source in a cloaked spaceship. Boarding the spaceship, the group rescue MOMO and fight Albedo, but are stopped by a blue-cloaked man who allows Albedo to escape with a piece of data extracted from MOMO that could grant access to Miltia. Albedo then summons Proto Merkebah, a research ship created by Mizrahi to summon U-DO, and destroys the Federation fleet before aiming Proto Merkebah's weapons at Second Miltia's capital. The blue-cloaked man—revealed to be a resurrected Virgil—observes events before being summoned away. Shion's group infiltrates Proto Markebah and destroys its core while Albedo flees. Escaping Proto Merkebah as it self-destructs, KOS-MOS shields the damaged Elsa as it enters Second Miltia's atmosphere.

== Development ==
Xenosaga Episode I was the debut game title of Japanese developer Monolith Soft. Company founder Tetsuya Takahashi acted as director and co-writer. Takahashi had previously worked at Square on the PlayStation RPG Xenogears. Initially planned as a six-part series and despite there being concept work for a sequel, Xenogears was left as a standalone project while Square decided to focus on their established franchises such as Final Fantasy. Another stated reason was that Square said they did not have the money available to invest in his concept. Following his departure from Square due to disagreeing with their strategy, Takahashi searched for another company which could help him create the game he and others from the Xenogears project envisioned. According to producer Hirohide Sugiura, most of the companies they contacted suggested forming Monolith Soft as an independent developer, with only Namco suggesting that they become a subsidiary, and was willing to both fund the production and manage the logistics and marketing, allowing Monolith Soft staff to focus solely on creating the game. Following this agreement, Namco helped in the development and marketing of the game. While production of the game began following the foundation of Monolith Soft in 2000, Takahashi had been working on the game's concept since 1999, intending it as a spiritual successor to Xenogears rather than a remake or sequel. Production at Monolith Soft took two years. The development budget apparently reached ¥1 billion—approximately US$7,700,000.

Xenosaga Episode I was developed by a core team of between 60 and 80 people, expanding to over 100 people at its most active development period. Among the staff, twenty of them had previously worked on Xenogears. The biggest issue faced when building the team was that they were developing for the PlayStation 2, a console with far more power than any previous console they had worked on. A major improvement in Takahashi's view over his work on Xenogears was that he was able to make the entire game using 3D graphics, something he had been unable to do with Xenogears. Due to the amount of preparatory work and getting accustomed to the new hardware, actual development did not start until 2000, lasting approximately a year. Namco provided development support with the motion capture technology. CGI sequences and backgrounds were created by Buildup Entertainment. Takahashi later noted that the sheer number of young and inexperienced developers in Monolith Soft negatively impacted development, with the graphics engine being completed only six months before the game's release. Prior to its announcement, the game was developed under the working title "Project X".

Character designs were cooperatively handled by Kunihiko Tanaka and Kouichi Mugitani, while mecha designs were handled by Mugitani and Junya Ishigaki. Mugitani also worked on the game as production designer. The art director was Yasuyuki Honne, who had previously worked on both Xenogears and Chrono Cross, while character motion was handled by Norihiro Takami. Honne collaborated with Takami in creating the character motions for cutscenes. When creating the designs, Tanaka was given an outline of a character by Takahashi in addition to comparisons with real-life actors, and then created the designs from that. Tanaka's art style—which gave characters large eyes dominating their faces—provided a challenge for the team as Takahashi wanted to be as close to the original artwork as possible, but the expressive power of the large-eyed facial design could easily be "destroyed" by the wrong lighting. Takami worked hard on character models to make sure the large eye styling was preserved without upsetting the model's balance. Mugitani and Ishigaki respectively handled the designs for Vector staff and the Federation. KOS-MOS was initially designed by Tanaka, but he had considerable trouble finalizing her design. Mugitani then contributed, creating something close to KOS-MOS's final design, which was then polished by Tanaka. Tanaka also had difficulty creating Shion's design, giving her glasses as an easy way of showing her personality.

The scenario for Episode I was co-written by Takahashi and his wife Soraya Saga. To ensure development of the game remained focused, Takahashi consulted the entire staff on the script's direction before the main production began. Takahashi initially planned Xenosaga to span six games, with a narrative divided into three parts all featuring the dual figures of KOS-MOS and chaos. The character of KOS-MOS was created by Takahashi. While human characters created by Takahashi and Saga were typically shown as strong despite having fragile bodies, KOS-MOS was designed to be the opposite; an "unbreakable" person with a fragile spirit. The names of KOS-MOS and chaos were deliberate plays on the philosophical concepts of order and chaos in the universe, tying into elements of Zen incorporated into the world structure. The game made heavy use of Biblical mythology, a trait shared with later entries in the series. The game's subtitle is taken from the native title of The Will to Power, a collection of notes by German philosopher Friedrich Nietzsche. The use of Nietzsche's works and concepts was a recurring element in the series; within the context of Episode I, the subtitle directly reflects the game's characters and the strength of their will. The Federation's military structure was based on the United States Army with some elements from the Imperial Japanese Army mixed in. In addition to references to Nietzsche, Takahashi incorporated references to Richard Wagner such as the ship name Woglinde due to Wagner's historic association with Nietzsche.

Xenosaga Episode I was first announced in June 2001, scheduled for release later that year. In September of that year, it was confirmed that the game had been delayed into February the following year. The game was released in Japan on February 28, 2002. In an interview, Takahashi confirmed that Western localization would begin following the game's Japanese release. The game was localized for the West by Interone Inc, with English dubbing handled by ZRO Limit Productions and Animaze. The localization process took over a year. While all blood, gore, religious references and adult language were retained in the Western release, one scene between the adult Albedo and the childlike MOMO had its more erotic elements toned down for the Western release. The game released in North America on February 25, 2003. This version, with the English voice work and additional costumes and bonus features, was later released in Japan under the title Xenosaga Episode I Reloaded on November 20, 2003.

=== Music ===
The music was composed by Yasunori Mitsuda, who had previously worked with Takahashi on the score of Xenogears. Mitsuda worked as both composer and orchestrator. Mitsuda was almost unable to collaborate on the project due to a tight schedule, but they were able to bring him in. As opposed to most RPG scores at the time, Mitsuda collaborated with Takahashi to create tracks for specific scenes in the game rather than a smaller number of repeating tracks. Due to the game's religious references, the score incorporated Gregorian chants. The score was performed by the London Philharmonic Orchestra. The vocal themes "Pain" and "Kokoro" were sung by Joanne Hogg, who had worked with Mitsuda on earlier projects. Multiple soundtrack albums were released, first from DigiCube and later through Mitsuda's own label Sleigh Bells. A single was released for the game's theme song "Kokoro".

== Reception ==
Reception

Aggregate score
Aggregator	Score
Metacritic	83/100 (35 reviews)

Review scores
Publication	Score
Famitsu	33/40
GamePro	4.5/5
GameSpot	8.1/10
GameSpy	4.5/5
IGN	8.8/10
RPGamer	7/10

Xenosaga Episode I reached the top of sales charts, selling over 240,000 units within three days of its release. By the end of the year, the game was the seventh best-selling game of 2002, with sales of near 340,000 units. While no exact figures were given, Namco reported that Episode I was one of their games that had seen commercial success internationally. In July 2003, Namco announced that the game had sold over one million copies worldwide.

Japanese magazine Famitsu positively noted the world and character development, while GamePro stated that the story and characters "[rivaled] that of a good, hard, science-fiction novel or the best anime series available". Greg Kasavin of GameSpot enjoyed the narrative, but felt that the Biblical elements were only there for shock value rather than being meaningful additions. Christian Nutt of GameSpy felt that the strong characters helped support the narrative. IGN's Jeremy Dunham was highly positive about the story and the development of characters, but noted that some might be dissatisfied with the unresolved story elements held over to later games. Jake Alley of RPGamer called the story "interesting", while Eurogamer's Rob Fahey praised the complexity and depth of the narrative. Multiple journalists noted the high number and length of cutscenes, with some enjoying them while others felt there were too many.

GamePro noted that the game was enjoyable despite it appearing "convoluted at first, even for RPG [veterans]". Kasavin appreciated the lack of random encounters and enjoyed the strategic flow of battle, while Nutt appreciated both the game's challenge and its deep mechanics. Dunham praised both the ease of gameplay following its introductory stages and the customization options available. He was less positive about most of the mini-games available. Fahay felt that the game had "excellent" gameplay, and like Sasavin praised the removal of random encounters. The A.G.W.S. mechs were seen by several reviewers as a lackluster addition to the gameplay. The mechanic used to enable the player to revisit dungeons was also frequently seen as contrived.

Kasavin called Episode I "a great-looking game" despite some lip-synching issues, and praised the cinematography and graphics used in cinematics. Nutt called the environments "pure visual pleasure" and the character models "both varied and uniformly excellent". Dunham praised the cinematography and gave particular praise to the animations of facial movements and expressions. Fahay, while generally finding the graphics excellent, praised the merging of cinematic and real-time graphics to create a smooth experience while playing the game. The music was generally praised by reviewers, although Kasavin and Alley felt that it was too scarce during gameplay segments. The English voice earned contrasting opinions from reviewers; while Alley and Nutt gave praise to the English cast, Dunham and Kasavin were less impressed by the overall performances, with Dunham comparing the dub to an average dub of a Japanese anime.

At the first Spike Video Game Awards in 2003, Xenosaga Episode I was nominated for the "Best Fantasy Game" and "Best Animation" categories, but lost to Star Wars: Knights of the Old Republic and Dead or Alive Xtreme Beach Volleyball respectively. During the 7th Annual Interactive Achievement Awards, the Academy of Interactive Arts & Sciences nominated Xenosaga for "Console Role-Playing Game of the Year", which was ultimately awarded to Star Wars: Knights of the Old Republic.

== Legacy ==
The international success of Xenosaga Episode I prompted Namco to offer developer MonolithSoft more support, with Namco's then-Vice President Yoichi Haraguchi to name the company as a valuable development partner alongside Namco Tales Studio. A manga adaptation was written by Atsushi Baba and published through Monthly Comic Zero Sum. The manga was released by the comic's publisher Ichijinsha across three volumes between 2004 and 2006. Following the release of Episode I, a supplementary disc was created titled Xenosaga Freaks. (Note: Zenosāga Furīkusu (Japanese: ゼノサーガ フリークス)) Released on April 28, 2004, Freaks is split into four segments; a visual novel segment featuring multiple characters from the game, a minigame dubbed XenoPittan, a dictionary that explains the game's terminology, and a demo for the game's official sequel. Freaks was part of a movement with the Xenosaga series to turn it into a multimedia franchise, with the project growing substantially larger than previously planned.

The sequel, Xenosaga Episode II, was developed by a new team with Takahashi overseeing the project so the series could be taken in a new direction by younger staff members within Monolith Soft. The scenario, written by Norihiko Yonesaka based on the initial draft by Takahashi and Saga, ended up leaving out a lot of the originally planned content. Episode II was released in Japan in June 2004, while it was released in North America in February 2005. The sequel was also published in Europe by Sony Computer Entertainment Europe in October of that year. Both Episode I and Episode II were re-imagined for the Nintendo DS as Xenosaga I & II, released in March 2006. Co-developed by Monolith Soft and Tom Create, the scenario was supervised by Takahashi and included material which needed to be cut from the original releases of the first two Xenosaga games. Xenosaga I & II remains exclusive to Japan.

Development of Xenosaga Episode III began while work was finishing on Episode II. While the team were open to further entries based on the game's commercial performance, it was designed to be the last entry in the series. Arai and Yonesaka returned respectively as director and scriptwriter. Takahashi provided the scenario draft and supervised the writing. Episode III released in 2006 in Japan and North America. Episode III was the last game released in the Xenosaga series.

=== Xenosaga: The Animation ===
Following the success of the game, a twelve-episode anime adaptation titled Xenosaga: The Animation was produced by Toei Animation; while no staff from the game were involved in the anime's production, the staff wanted to keep the anime as close to the game's events as possible. First announced in 2004, the anime was first broadcast on TV Asahi between January and March 2005. The anime was first licensed and dubbed by A.D. Vision. The license was later picked up by Funimation Entertainment. Multiple staff from Xenosaga: The Animation would later take part in the production of Xenosaga I & II.
