= New Allegiances =

- Spooks episode
- Episode no.: Series 7 Episode 1
- Directed by: Colm McCarthy
- Written by: Neil Cross & Ben Richards
- Original air date: 27 October 2008
- Running time: 59 minutes

Guest appearances
- Ian Virgo as Private Andy Sullivan; Shane Zaza as Aaqib Faris; Gus Gallagher as Boscard; Stuart Wilson as Arkady Kachimov; Guy Williams as Henry Wyndham; Tex Jacks as Kid at memorial; James Dicker as Wes Carter

Episode chronology
← Previous "The School"	Next → "Split Loyalties"
- Spooks (series 7)

"New Allegiances" is the series seven premiere and 57th episode of the British espionage television series Spooks. It was originally broadcast on BBC One on 27 October 2008. The episode was written by Neil Cross, with additional writing by Ben Richards, and directed by Colm McCarthy. The episode is considered the first of a two-part story, which concludes with following episode "Split Loyalties".

In the episode, Private Andy Sullivan (Ian Virgo) is kidnapped by an Al-Qaeda cell, who demand Remembrance Sunday be cancelled or he will be executed. Adam Carter (Rupert Penry-Jones) and recently returned Lucas North (Richard Armitage), who spent the past eight years in a Russian prison, work together to find him, only to realise the kidnapping was a diversion to bomb a Remembrance ceremony. Adam drives the rigged car to safety, but dies in the explosion. Knowing FSB head of operation in London Arkady Kachimov (Stuart Wilson) withheld the bomb plot, Harry Pearce (Peter Firth) plots revenge.

Before the episode was broadcast, it was announced that Rupert Penry-Jones would leave the series after playing Adam Carter for four years, while afterwards, another announcement was made introducing a new lead character, Lucas North. Inspiration towards the plot for the episode, and the remainder of the series, came from the resurgence of Russia, which the producers felt would in subtle ways threaten the security of the West. The episode was partially filmed on location in Moscow, the first time in series history where filming took place outside the United Kingdom.

After its original broadcast, the episode attracted almost six million viewers; although it won its time slot, the episode was down by over one million viewers from the last series premiere. The episode received generally positive reactions for its plot, as well as the introduction of Lucas and death of Adam.

== Plot ==
The episode is set six months after the series six finale, where Jo Portman (Miranda Raison) and Adam Carter were kidnapped by the Redbacks, a mercenary group known for kidnapping intelligence officers and selling them to be tortured. At the end of the episode, Jo appears to have been killed by Adam to spare her from the torture before they could be rescued. However, in a flashback it is revealed Jo played dead before rescue teams arrived, and later beats her kidnapper, Boscard (Gus Gallagher), to death. At first undecided, towards the end of the episode Jo returns to duty. In the meantime, Sir Harry Pearce secures the release of MI5 officer Lucas North, who was imprisoned in Russia for eight years.

In the main plot, British Army Private Andy Sullivan, on leave from Afghanistan, is kidnapped by members of an Al-Qaeda cell while on his way home to see his wife and newborn daughter. From an Internet broadcast, they demand Britain cancel the ceremonies during Remembrance Sunday or Sullivan will be executed. Lucas feels determined to help, much to Harry's reluctance, as he believes Lucas should be properly rested, but eventually allows him to work until they find Sullivan. Malcolm Wynn-Jones (Hugh Simon) voice matches one of the terrorists to Aaqib Faris (Shane Zaza), and learns he works under a Munzir Hatem, a known cell leader. In the middle of the night, Adam and Lucas silently break into Hatem's home and gather intelligence from his mobile phone. On the morning of Remembrance Sunday, the team find that Hatem sends out messages to a man codenamed "Firefly" to relay it to Faris. Ben Kaplan (Alex Lanipekun) follows Firefly to a payphone, and Malcolm traces where he is calling. Adam and Lucas arrive at the house Sullivan is being held and successfully rescues him.

As this transpires, Ros Myers (Hermione Norris) is stationed in Moscow under the codename "Rangefinder". There she finds intelligence on Tranquility, a codename of a Chechen assassin working with Al-Qaeda. After arriving back in London, Ros discovers Sullivan's kidnapping was a diversion; Tranquility is going to bomb a St. Augustus War Memorial ceremony at 11 am. Adam and Lucas arrive at the ceremony; while Lucas follows Tranquility, Adam discovers the bomb in her car that can only be defused by a code. When Tranquility kills herself, Adam must drive the car to an unpopulated zone. Adam makes it, but the car explodes just as he exits, killing him.

Harry realised earlier that FSB head of operations in London Arkady Kachimov purposely withheld the bomb plot when he announces chatter between Chechnya and Al-Qaeda, and plans to commit revenge. Kachimov meanwhile, is on the phone, and asks "is it enroute?" to the person on the other end, and appears pleased to the response. In the next episode, it is revealed to be a Russian submarine planning a cyber attack on a submarine communications cable. In the end, Harry visits Wes Carter, Adam's son, to tell him his father died.

== Production ==
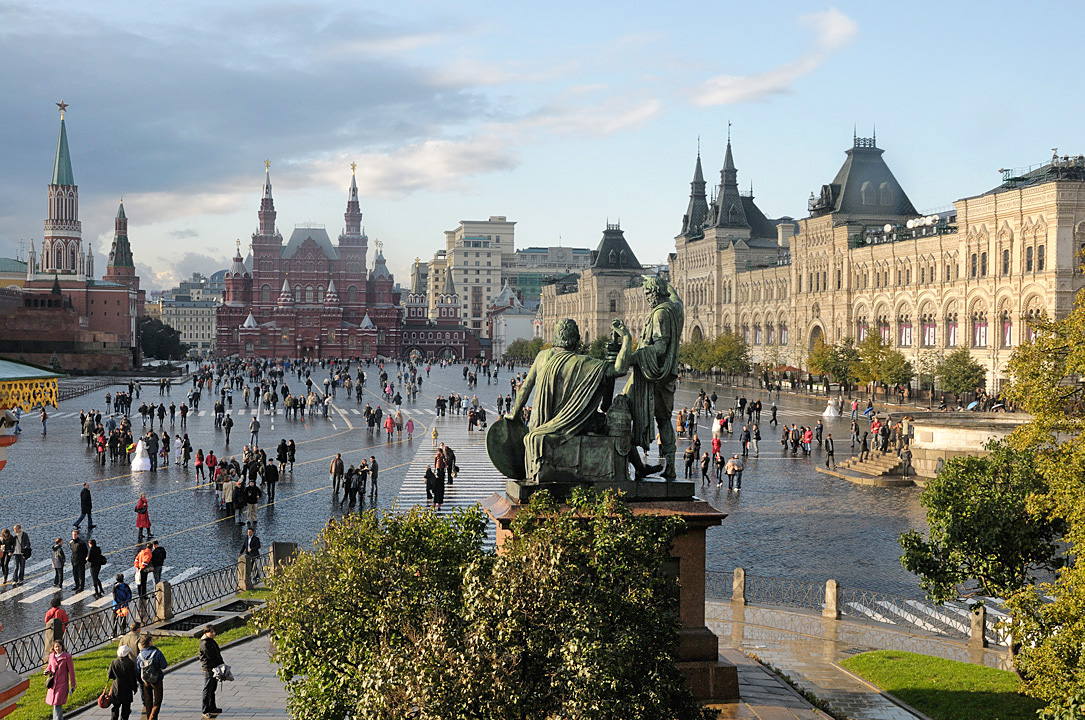
Filming partially took place in Moscow, Russia. It was the first time in series history where filming took place outside the United Kingdom.

After portraying Adam Carter for four years, Rupert Penry-Jones felt his character had run its course over the series and wanted to explore other venues, stating he was "getting to the point where I needed to move on." In December 2007, before the sixth series finale was shown, Penry-Jones announced he would leave the series sometime during its seventh year, and revealed the character would leave in what he believed to be "one of the best" Spooks exits. To keep the series in general fresh, the producers wanted to tease the audience into thinking whether or not Adam would escape his fate in time, and even after he is killed, wanted to surprise them and make them think "Oh my God, I can't believe they just did that." Penry-Jones found that his last days on Spooks was generally upsetting and "welled up" on his final day.

Afterwards in March 2008, another announcement was made, where a new character was revealed to be in development; Lucas North. The producers wanted to create Lucas to become a "new heroic figure." They focused on casting Richard Armitage in the early stages as they felt he could carry the mystery of the character. Armitage was approached following the completion of the second series of Robin Hood, for which he portrayed the regular part of Sir Guy of Gisbourne. He was initially hesitant to join the series because of the "tall order" for replacing Penry-Jones. To keep with the description that Lucas is malnourished on his first appearance, Armitage lost a stone in weight, but also had to keep physically fit in order to perform a fight sequence during his first week of filming. Hermione Norris also returns to the series as Ros Myers, having previously left the series in the eighth episode of the sixth series because of her pregnancy.

With regards to the plot, the producers wanted to repeat the same style as the previous sixth series and include another story-arc in the seventh. The writers and producers got together to think about what is to become a big political story that will affect the United Kingdom in twelve to eighteen months time. They decided on using the resurgence of power in Russia following the end of the Cold War, which the producers felt in subtle ways, is threatening the security of the West. The new storyline would allow the series to return to the world of spying, truth, and who the character should trust. The episode was written by Neil Cross. It was also additionally written by Ben Richards.

Filming in London commenced at the start of March 2008. The car explosion was filmed at Finsbury Square. Because it was a large explosion, much of the filming crew present recorded the shot on their mobile phones for the cast to view. Miranda Raison believed the explosion was the "biggest bang" on British television. In August of the same year, production moved to Moscow to film scenes for this episode, as well as the penultimate episode of the seventh series. It was the first time in series history where filming took place outside the United Kingdom; filming Spooks took place in London, and producer Katie Swinden noted the filming the series was very "London-orientated," and do not usually film outside the M25 motorway, which circles the city. On that occasion however, the producers were able to afford a shoot in another country. Only Armitage and Hermione Norris, along with a small crew including director Sam Miller and Swinden, could film in Moscow. One of the troubles of filming the scenes in Moscow was because the episode was set in November, Norris had to wear a winter coat during 32 degree heat.

== Broadcast and reception ==
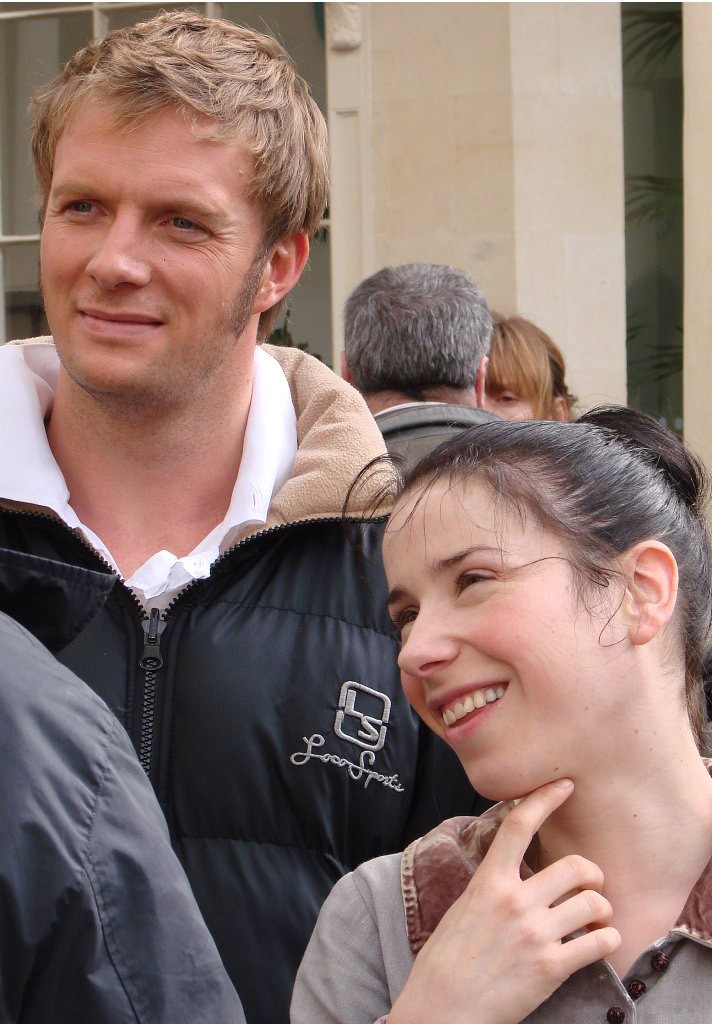
Fans and critics displayed shock towards the death of Adam Carter, portrayed by Rupert Penry-Jones (pictured).

The episode was originally broadcast on BBC One, during the 9 pm to 10 pm time slot on Monday, 27 October 2008, except in Northern Ireland, where it was withheld until 10:35 pm. After its original broadcast, the episode received unofficial overnight viewing figures of 5.5 million and an audience share of 23.4 per cent. Spooks won its time slot against other terrestrial channels, including the final episode of ITV1's Wired, which attracted only 3.1 million viewers. However, the episode was down by 1.1 million from the series six premiere. According to the Broadcasters' Audience Research Board, the episode received final viewing figures of 5.91 million, placing Spooks the 12th most seen programme on BBC One, and the 28th most seen programme overall during the week the episode was broadcast.

The episode received generally positive reviews from television critics. The Guardian published three separate reviews. Gareth McLean stated "rare is the returning British drama that gets you giddy but, back for its seventh series and resolving last year's big cliffhanger, Spooks returns triumphant," adding "it's no secret that Ros is back, Adam is leaving and new boy Lucas North has been rescued from a Russian prison, but how it all plays out is a delight." Vicky Frost from the media blog Organgrinder felt that although the storyline was decent, "it did seem to be about three different episodes stuffed into one." She also noted that it was generally "ridiculous, but it isn't nearly as ridiculous – or ridiculously bad – as its spin-off [Spooks: Code 9] was." Leigh Holmwood however, believed "it was good to see the spy drama return for a seventh series with a high octane episode mixing Islamic terrorism and Russian counter espionage, even if it did overdo the 'for Queen and country' bit." Holmwood also stated he was "tempted to watch the second episode," which was broadcast a day after the first episode on BBC One.

Wayne Storr of On the Box stated the series premiere is "another cracking episode," and "truly wonderful that Spooks still pulls it together to be one of the best British shows on telly." Storr also stated the episode is an "absolute must watch for anyone who has ever been a fan. For those who aren't, now is a good time to start." Whilst also reviewing the second episode, as both episodes are considered a two-parter, Greg O'Keefe of the Liverpool Echo stated it was "packed with great action sequences, razor-sharp writing and the usual quota of twists and turns. We were also treated to some excellent scenes, shot in Moscow, as the pesky Russians were established as the villains of the series." John Beresford of TV Scoop stated that although he found "two dodgy moments" in the episode, it "didn't mar what was otherwise an excellent opener to the new series."

Lucas North's introduction was met with general praise. Sky TV described his introduction as a "refreshing change" for the series. The Bromsgrove Advertiser noted that Armitage "certainly has the looks needed for the part" with "classic leading man presence," and while comparing past main actors of the series, Matthew Macfadyen and Rupert Penry-Jones, the author believed that "the eye candy quota is being kept high." Fans and critics have also both displayed shock towards Adam Carter's death. Fans voted Adam's death as the fourth most shocking death scene in the series according to a poll on LastBroadcast. The Radio Times stated the shock factor of his death was "spectacular" and said that "driving a primed car bomb to a safe place is so run-of-the-mill for the spooks they wouldn't normally break a sweat. This time, however, it went off." Hilary Rose of The Times noted that fans will remember Adam's "dramatic exit," and said that "the nation's women duly went into mourning," regarding that "pretty much every woman with a pulse seems to fancy Rupert." She then noted that some would find "consolation in the shape of new Spooks totty Richard Armitage."
