= Split Loyalties =

- Spooks episode
- Episode no.: Series 7 Episode 2
- Directed by: Colm McCarthy
- Written by: Neil Cross & Ben Richards
- Original air dates: 27 October 2008 (BBC Three); 28 October 2008 (BBC One)
- Running time: 58 minutes

Guest appearances
- Robert East as Richard Dolby; Stuart Wilson as Arkady Kachimov; Marcia Ashton as Mrs. Moore; Paloma Baeza as Elizabeta Starkova; Georg Nikoloff as Alexander Beletsky; Guy Williams as Henry Wyndham

Episode chronology
← Previous "New Allegiances"	Next → "The Tip-Off"
- Spooks (series 7)

"Split Loyalties" is the second episode of series seven of the British espionage television series Spooks, and the 58th episode overall. It was originally broadcast on BBC Three on 27 October 2008, and repeated on frontline channel BBC One the following day. The episode was written by head writer Neil Cross; with additional writing by Ben Richards; and directed by Colm McCarthy. The episode is considered the second of a two-part story, following preceding episode "New Allegiances".

In the episode, Sir Harry Pearce (Peter Firth) is determined to carry out his revenge on London's FSB head of operations Arkady Kachimov (Stuart Wilson), who in the previous episode purposely withheld intelligence that caused the death of Adam Carter. However, the MI5 team discover he is overseeing a cyber attack in progress, and returned officer Lucas North (Richard Armitage) may be involved. In the end, MI5 stop the attack, and Harry kills Kachimov.

"Split Loyalties" include four deleted scenes, which were not included in the final episode, but placed in the series' official website. The episode attracted over five million viewers after its broadcast, as well as receiving generally positive reviews from television critics.

== Plot ==
Eight hours following the death of Adam Carter, Ros Myers (Hermione Norris) and Sir Harry Pearce (Peter Firth) discuss how they are to get back at FSB head of operations in London Arkady Kachimov (Stuart Wilson). Afterwards, Ros returns to her hotel room, and destroys it in a fit of rage. The next morning, Harry asks Richard Dolby (Robert East) to go after Kachimov, but is refused. However, Harry decides to disobey and go after Kachimov anyway, and promotes Ros to chief of Section D, a position previously held by Adam. Harry calls Lucas North (Richard Armitage) to meet with him for information on Kachimov. Before Lucas arrives, he calls Kachimov to warn him Harry is coming after him. Later, Lucas is appointed a handler from the FSB, and is shocked to find it is his ex-wife, Elizabeta Starkova (Paloma Baeza).

Meanwhile, Malcolm Wynn-Jones (Hugh Simon) discovers a communication burst coming from the North Sea, believing a Russian submarine is entering British waters unannounced to carry out a mission. After learning that Alexander Beletsky (Georg Nikoloff), a man with connections to Kachimov, is going to shut down his company's servers, Malcolm confirms his suspicions; the Russians are planning a cyber attack against Britain by breaking into a submarine communications cable and shutting down every computer system in the country. Harry urges Dolby to temporarily shut down the Internet, but is once again denied. Later, Ros breaks into Lucas' flat while he is away, and discovers Lucas is a double agent, feeding the Russians news that MI5 know about their planned attack. Ros tasers Lucas and brings him back to Thames House. Lucas admits he is spying for the Russians because Kachimov promised he would be released from prison sooner if he would, but also reveals he intends to bring Kachimov down by making him trust Lucas.

Although sceptical, Harry sends Lucas to Kachimov to learn which cable the submarine will attack so Malcolm can launch a counterattack. Lucas is able to turn Kachimov by forging evidence that he is an MI5 mole. They both go to the Russian embassy and find the submarine's location, after which Malcolm launches the counterattack with seconds to spare. Kachimov is later arrested. Lucas visits Elizabeta at her home, which was also their married home and he asks her to become an asset to MI5 to save her from arrest because of her association with Kachimov. In the end, Kachimov is with Harry and Ros in a field. Kachimov states his admiration for Adam's sacrifice, but then callously says he was a replaceable resource. In the final moments, Ros hands Harry a gun and Harry kills Kachimov with a shot to the chest.

== Production ==
The episode was written by head writer Neil Cross. It was also additionally written by Ben Richards. The plot of the episode was influenced by the resurgence of power in Russia following the end of the Cold War, which the producers felt in subtle ways is threatening the security of the West. The producers also included scenes that would show Lucas adjusting to the outside world following eight years of imprisonment, to show how emotionally damaged the character is, and make the audience realise he is struggling. One of the scenes include Lucas struggling to sleep on a bed, and soon resorts to lying on the floor instead.

The episode includes four deleted scenes, which feature more on Adam's past. In the scenes Harry tells Ros that he was looking for Adam's mother, but could not find her because before his death, Adam altered her records on where she lived. Harry visits a wealthy estate where she worked and is told she is currently in Blackpool. In the last scene, Harry and Ros toast to Adam. Those scenes have been included on BBC iPlayer on the Spooks website.

== Broadcast and reception ==
The episode was originally broadcast on digital channel BBC Three from 10:30 pm on Monday, 27 October 2008, the same day as the BBC One viewing of the first episode. The episode would be repeated on the frontline BBC One a day later, during the 9 pm to 10 pm time slot. The BBC Three broadcast was viewed by 827,000 and a 7.3% audience share. It was the second most seen multichannel of the night, beaten by the first episode of Dead Set from E4. The BBC One repeat was seen by 5.06 million viewers with a 22.2 per cent; though it was down by 450,000 from the previous episode, it still won its time slot; and both broadcasts achieved a total reach of 5.89 million. According to the Broadcasters' Audience Research Board, the episode received final viewing figures of 0.93 million on BBC Three, and 5.63 million on BBC One; together they add up to 6.56 million.

The Daily Telegraph stated "after yesterday's shock demise of series pin-up Rupert Penry-Jones as Adam, fans of the spy drama may be forgiven for approaching the second episode of the new series with trepidation. Fear not, though, there are no star deaths [...] only one rather welcome one [Lucas]." John Beresford of TV Scoop praised the entire episode, stating "the pace didn't let up from start to finish, the whole thing looked awesome, the acting was pitch perfect," and the dialogue "never drops into the realms of trite, or hyperbole, or parody. Each phrase is like a diamond. Tight, bright and sparkling. And able to cut deep," adding "this series is already shaping up to be a classic." Beresford also noted Armitage's performance, although this was only his second appearance, "Armitage looks and sounds like he's been here all along." Greg O'Keefe of the Liverpool Echo, who also reviewed the first episode, as both episodes are considered a two-part story, stated it was "packed with great action sequences, razor-sharp writing and the usual quota of twists and turns. We were also treated to some excellent scenes, shot in Moscow, as the pesky Russians were established as the villains of the series."
