= Ros Myers =

Fictional character from Spooks

- Spooks character
- Hermione Norris as Ros Myers
- First appearance: "Gas and Oil, Part 1"
- Last appearance: "Series 8, Episode 8"
- Portrayed by: Hermione Norris

In-universe information
- Title(s): Senior Case Officer, Section D (5.2–6.8); Chief of Section D (7.2–8.8)
- Occupation: MI5 officer
- Family: Sir Jocelyn Myers (father)
- Nationality: English

Rosalind Sarah Myers is a fictional character from the BBC television series Spooks, which follows the exploits of Section D, a counter-terrorism division in MI5.

She is portrayed by British actress Hermione Norris. The character was a former MI6 officer who joins MI5 in the fifth series.

== Role in Spooks ==
Ros Myers is introduced in the first episode of the fifth series as an MI6 officer working under Michael Collingwood. In the same episode, Section D learns that Collingwood is plotting a conspiracy to overrule the Prime Minister, and launch measures to combat terrorism, at the cost of several civil liberties.

In the second episode, Ros learns that her father, Sir Jocelyn Myers, is funding the conspiracy, and she persuades him out of it, as the rest of the team stop Collingwood. At the end of the episode, Adam Carter (Rupert Penry-Jones) offers her a position in Section D, which she takes. In the fourth episode, she is angered to learn that despite Harry Pearce's (Peter Firth) promise of going easy on her father, he is instead sentenced to 20 years imprisonment.

She was succeeded as Chief of Section D by Lucas North who had previously served as Chief of Section D in the late 1990s before Tom Quinn.

== Reception ==
The character has been well received by critics; Guardian journalist Gareth McLean wrote during the broadcast of Spooks' seventh series that "Not only is Ros Myers the best character that Spooks has ever had [...] she's also the best female character currently on television." On the website of The Stage, Scott Matthewman concurred with McLean, writing, "She is indeed one of the hottest female characters on television at the moment."

For her part in the series, Hermione Norris won the Best Actress award at the inaugural Crime Thriller Awards in 2008. She was nominated in the same category the next year.
