= Series 8, Episode 8 (Spooks) =

- Spooks episode
- Episode no.: Series 8 Episode 8
- Directed by: Alrick Riley
- Written by: Ben Richards
- Original air date: 23 December 2009
- Running time: 58 minutes

Guest appearances
- Tobias Menzies as Andrew Lawrence; Mark Aiken as Russell Price; Roger Yuan as Heng; James Weber Brown as Summit Journalist; Ben Peel as MI5 Officer; Nicholas Khan as President Mudasser

Episode chronology
← Previous "Series 8, Episode 7"	Next → "Series 9, Episode 1"
- Spooks (series 8)

The series eight finale of the British espionage television series Spooks was originally broadcast on BBC One on 23 December 2009, and is the 72nd episode in the overall series. The episode was written by Ben Richards and directed by Alrick Riley. The episode continues the "Nightingale" story-arc, a shadow organisation bent on changing the geopolitical map. In the finale, Nightingale attempt to provoke a nuclear war between India and Pakistan, and Section D have a week to prevent it.

The episode was based on actual reports of conflict between the two nations. Hermione Norris made her final appearance as Ros Myers; the producers intended to leave her fate open in order for the audience to debate whether or not she survived the hotel explosion at the end of the episode. It was viewed by under six million viewers after its original broadcast, and received overwhelmingly positive reviews, particularly due to the reveal of Nightingale's plot and the cliffhanger, questioning whether or not Ros survived the hotel explosion.

== Background ==
The finale continues the story-arc involving a multinational shadow organisation bent on changing the geopolitical map. Referred to as "Nightingale", actor Richard Armitage has said that "India, Pakistan and China feature heavily. But everyone, including Russia, America and Britain have a finger in the pie." In the sixth episode it is revealed that CIA liaison and Lucas North's (Armitage) lover Sarah Caufield (Genevieve O'Reilly) is part of the organisation, and flees when Lucas confronts her. In the previous episode, Section D discover that Nightingale is manipulating Hindus and Muslims to attack each other in an attempt to further tarnish relations between India and Pakistan; Section D is able to prevent the attacks in the British, but it is later revealed that Nightingale succeeded in setting up similar attacks throughout the rest of Europe and the United States.

== Plot ==
An Indian submarine is forced into port at Karachi by the Pakistan Navy. Knowing it is a Nightingale plot – Pakistani General Azim Ali is a member – Section D learn they have a week to stop a nuclear war between India and Pakistan. News of this shocks the team, particularly Tariq Masood (Shazad Latif), who has family in Lahore. Ruth Evershed (Nicola Walker) discovers the name of a prominent Nightingale operative, Hans Lindemann. While Lucas North and Ros Myers work to bug Lindemann's office, Sarah Caufield returns, having been ordered by CIA Head of European Operations Russell Price (Mark Aiken), also a Nightingale member, to kill Lucas. Instead, Sarah warns him to leave the country before escaping.

Ruth meets a Chinese contact, Heng (Roger Yuan), who tells her that both countries will fail the negotiations and that war is inevitable. He is shot dead by an assassin in front of her. Tariq finds Sarah staying at a hotel under an assumed name. Lucas and Ros apprehend her after Lucas distracts her and Ros shoots her in the leg. At a hospital, Sarah reveals to Lucas that Nightingale wants India and Pakistan to go to war in order to "contain" the future, where Nightingale believes the Taliban will take over Pakistan and gain control of nuclear weapons, though the war will kill several million innocent lives in the process. As Lucas leaves the room momentarily to call Ros, an assassin kills Sarah; Lucas captures him and learns that Price arranged the hit.

To prevent negotiations from succeeding, Price rigs the Summit hotel with explosives. To prevent Pakistani President Mudasser (Nicholas Khan) and Home Secretary Andrew Lawrence (Tobias Menzies) from escaping, he paralyses both of them. Learning Price is in the hotel, Lucas and Ros arrive and capture him. Since disarming the bomb is impossible, Ros threatens to leave Price behind when the bomb explodes unless he divulges the room both politicians are held. Although Price eventually discloses the room number, Ros leaves him in the room where the bomb is anyway. Lucas is able to carry Mudasser safely out of the hotel, where he recovers and orders the release of the Indian submarine, preventing the war. However, Ros is still in the hotel, struggling to pull Lawrence to safety. As Lucas runs back to aid her, the hotel explodes, killing Lawrence, Price and Ros.

== Production ==
=== Writing and pre-production ===
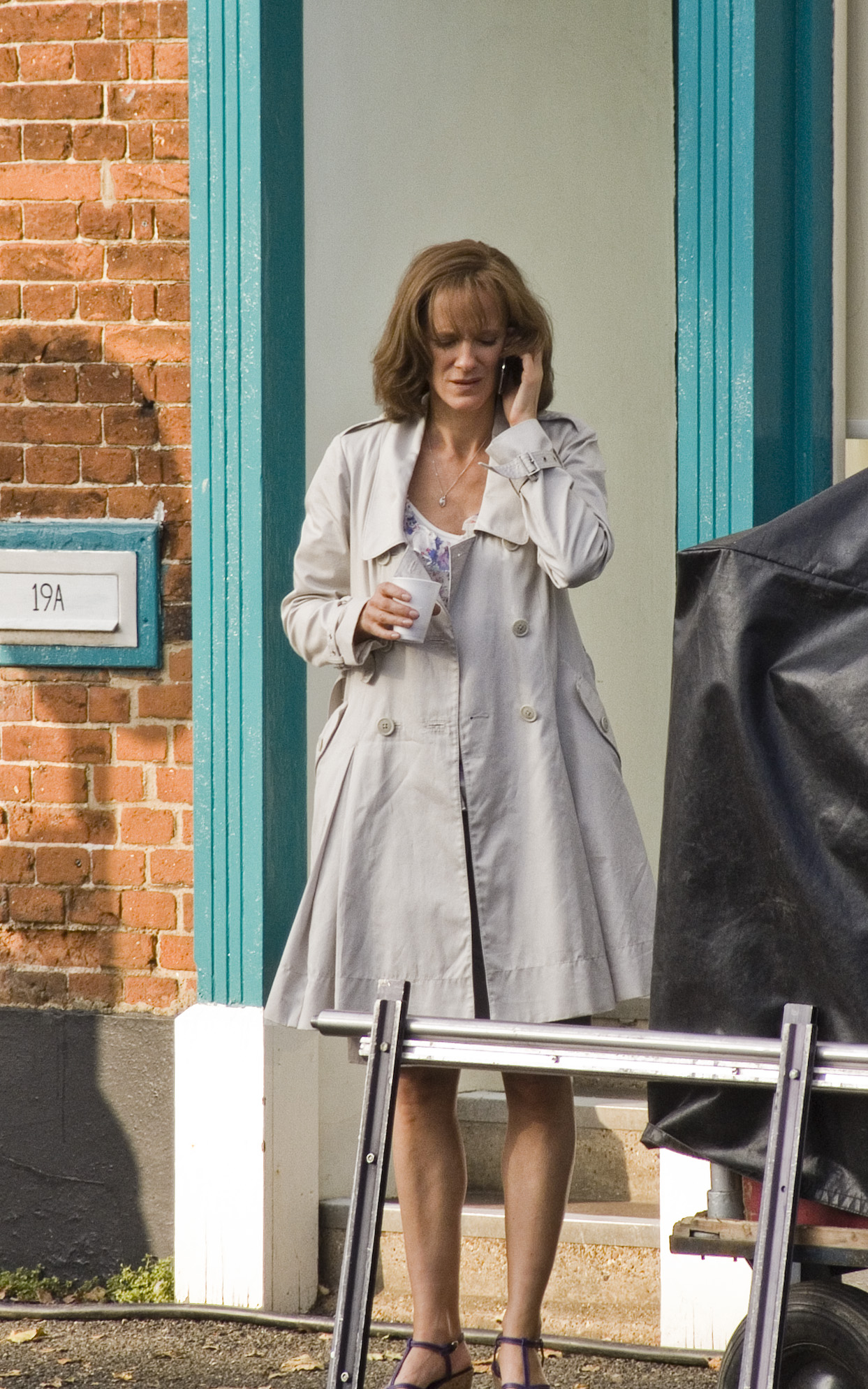
The episode is Hermione Norris' last as Ros Myers.

Before the episode aired there was speculation that Hermione Norris will leave the series following the "explosive finale explosive cliffhanger." When questioned whether she will leave the series, Norris would not comment. In June 2010, co-star Richard Armitage confirmed that Norris has left the series, meaning the series eight finale was her final episode as Ros. The producers left the episode end with a cliffhanger to have the audience debate whether or not Ros and Lawrence survived the hotel explosion. Casting an actor as Russell Price was initially a problem for the producers, but they decided to cast Mark Aiken for the role following his work in American television. An actual news reporter was cast to record a news story. The reporter runs the dialogue with the producers at 4:30 in the morning, and then record the story before 6am, the time reporters start their work on actual news stories.

The episode was written by Ben Richards. The general plot of India and Pakistan on the verge of nuclear war is based on actual reports of conflict between the two nations. The beginning was not originally in the script; Richards wanted to feature a submarine crisis, but the producers were not sure what the crisis would be. They eventually decided to have an Indian submarine "taken hostage" by the Pakistanis. They wanted to add a personal stake towards Tariq, by revealing that members of his family live in Pakistan. The intent was to include and develop a potential relationship between Ros and Lawrence to the point where they bond during their final scenes before the hotel explosion. They also wanted to touch up on the Harry/Ruth relationship, which was not in the original script; so Ben Richards added the scenes as additional dialogue.

Despite the seriousness of the episode, Richards included some wit and humour. For instance, the scene where Lucas bugs Lindemann's office and "small talks" Ros; the producers wanted the scene to be different from similar scenes from movies involving secret agents planting bugs in offices and homes. The producers also wanted to have Ruth return her confidence in her work, back to how she was before her departure. The finale also includes Lucas being confused over Sarah. The writing team wanted him to despise her as a villain, but at the same time, still maintain feelings for her. Following her death, they did not want Lucas to be calm and calculating when confronting the assassin, but instead make him "lose it" and then have him broken afterward.

=== Filming ===
A scene in the pre-title sequence was filmed during the same block as episodes three and four, which were directed by Sam Miller. The rest of the finale was filmed several weeks later. The inside of a surveillance van used in a few scenes were shot at a set right next to the Grid set; using a set would be more manageable for the filming crew. A military school in Belgravia was used to film two separate locations; the Home Office and Lindemann's office. Other scenes at the Home Office were filmed in a separate building in Roehampton.

The hospital Sarah was held was filmed at a new private hospital in Hammersmith that was closed down at the time. A Radisson Edwardian Hotel in the London Docklands served as the filming location for the Summit Hotel; the management of the hotel were cooperative and allowed the filming crew access to several rooms and facilities. The scene where Ruth meets Heng was filmed at Dollis Hill; it was the last scene of the episode to be shot, and was completed in one afternoon. In the fight scene between Ros and Sarah at Lindemann's office, Hermione Norris played herself, and a stunt double stood in for Genevieve O'Reilly, because her character was getting "thrown about a lot". The fight scene between Lucas and Sarah's assassin were performed by Armitage and stunt coordinator Crispin Layfield respectively.

The scene where the Pakistanis take control of the Indian submarine were archival footage taken from the BBC Motion Gallery. Split screen sequences were placed towards the end more than the rest of the episode to show the audience there is a bomb at the hotel with several police officers outside the building and Lucas and Ros looking around the hotel for Lawrence and Mudasser. The sequence where the hotel exploded was made through the medium of visual effects, produced by Darkside Animation.

== Broadcast and reception ==
The episode originally aired on BBC One at 9pm on 23 December 2009, and later repeated on BBC Three at 12:45am on 24 December. After its original broadcast, the series finale drew 5.5 million viewers, earning the series a 23% audience share during its time slot. It won the time slot against BBC Two's Grumpy Guide to Christmas, ITV1's Bridget Jones: The Edge of Reason, and Channel 4's The Family. According to the Broadcasters' Audience Research Board, the episode received final viewing figures of 5.91 million, placing Spooks the 25th most seen programme on BBC One, and the 36th most seen programme overall during the week it aired.

Reviews of the episode were very positive. In a preview for the episode, Vicky Power of The Daily Telegraph said that "as usual there's a large body count and fist-fights, but these are tempered by scenes of high emotion", and if the episode were Ros' last, "it is a fitting send-off". David Chater of The Times was positive towards the episode, stating "just in case you think you're having an exhausting time in the run-up to Christmas, spare a thought for Lucas North [who found out] his lover is a liar, a murderer and a traitor", and also noted that "the great thing about Spooks is that they will always stop and explain how serious things are".

The Guardian published two separate reviews for the episode. Sam Wollaston started by saying "they never listen", noting the "prisoner either disappears or is killed" and that Section D "need to rethink the whole prisoner thing, or hire less rubbish guards"; however, Wollaston also noted that since it was Sarah who was killed, "mo one's really going to miss snaky Sarah much". Plot-wise, Wollaston liked the phrase "getting pretty Finding Nemo about it", and said that Ros "better had" survived the cliffhanger, claiming "Spooks without Ros would be like Christmas without presents". Vicky Frost called the episode a "cracking finale", stating that after "weeks of build-up, it feels almost a relief to have the Nightingale plot finally revealed". In regards to the cliffhanger, Frost commented that Spooks has "passed its peak but not sunk so low as to be embarrassing, it still goes out on something of a high, and it's remembered as a decent example of its type". She was also receptive of Norris' portrayal as Ros in her likely final appearance, but felt the Harry and Ruth relationship was "wolly".
