= List of Spooks episodes =

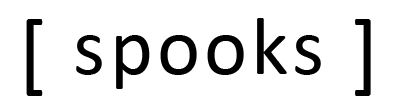

Spooks (known as MI-5 in certain countries) is a British spy drama television series, created by David Wolstencroft. It debuted on BBC One on 13 May 2002. The series follows the activities of the intelligence officers of Section D in MI5. In 2003 it won the British Academy Television Award for Best Drama Series.

From its debut until its finale on 23 October 2011, 86 episodes were aired across ten complete series. The first series has six episodes, and series two through six have 10 episodes each. Series seven through nine have eight episodes each. The ninth series aired between September and November 2010. The tenth and final series, which began airing on 18 September 2011, consists of six episodes. The individual episodes have no official titles, though there are internal working titles. The USA versions air with titles, which sometimes, but not always, match the working titles.

== Series overview ==
Series	Episodes	Originally released		Average viewership (in millions)
Series	Episodes	First released	Last released	Average viewership (in millions)
1	6	13 May 2002	17 June 2002	7.49 (Note: Based from the consolidated ratings from the first series for BBC One.)
2	10	2 June 2003	11 August 2003	7.19 (Note: Based from the consolidated ratings from the second series for BBC One, with the exception of the sixth episode which are not available.)
3	10	11 October 2004	13 December 2004	5.77 (Note: Based from the consolidated ratings from the third series for BBC One.)
4	10	12 September 2005	10 November 2005	6.05 (Note: Based from the consolidated ratings from the fourth series for BBC One.)
5	10	17 September 2006	13 November 2006	5.97 (Note: Based from the consolidated ratings from the fifth series for BBC One.)
6	10	16 October 2007	18 December 2007	5.57 (Note: Based from the consolidated ratings from the sixth series for BBC One.)
7	8	27 October 2008	8 December 2008	5.46 (Note: Based from the consolidated ratings from the seventh series for BBC One.)
8	8	4 November 2009	23 December 2009	5.34 (Note: Based from the consolidated ratings from the eighth series for BBC One, with the exception of the seventh episode which are not available.)
9	8	20 September 2010	8 November 2010	6.33 (Note: Based from the consolidated ratings from the ninth series for BBC One.)
10	6	18 September 2011	23 October 2011	5.41 (Note: Based from the consolidated ratings from the final series for BBC One.)

== Episodes ==
=== Series 1 (2002) ===
No. overall	No. in series	Title	Directed by	Written by	Original release date	UK viewers (millions)
1	1	"Thou Shalt Not Kill"	Bharat Nalluri	David Wolstencroft	13 May 2002	9.60
2	2	"Looking After Our Own"	Bharat Nalluri	David Wolstencroft	20 May 2002	8.10
3	3	"One Last Dance"	Rob Bailey	Simon Mirren	27 May 2002	7.30
4	4	"Traitor's Gate"	Rob Bailey	Howard Brenton	4 June 2002	5.99
5	5	"The Rose Bed Memoirs"	Andy Wilson	Howard Brenton	10 June 2002	6.75
6	6	"Lesser of Two Evils" "Mean, Dirty, Nasty"	Andy Wilson	David Wolstencroft & Howard Brenton	17 June 2002	7.21

=== Series 2 (2003) ===
No. overall	No. in series	Title	Directed by	Written by	Original release date	UK viewers (millions)
7	1	"Legitimate Targets"	Bharat Nalluri	David Wolstencroft	2 June 2003 (BBC One)	8.16
8	2	"Nest of Angels"	Bharat Nalluri	Howard Brenton	2 June 2003 (BBC Three) (Note: "Nest of Angels" was broadcast on 9 June 2003 on BBC One; the rest of the series (apart from the finale) would usually rebroadcast on BBC One seven days after the BBC Three broadcast.)	7.87
9	3	"Spiders" "Hackers"	Rob Bailey	Matthew Graham	9 June 2003 (BBC Three)	7.18
10	4	"Blood and Money"	Rob Bailey	Howard Brenton	16 June 2003 (BBC Three)	7.38
11	5	"I Spy Apocalypse"	Justin Chadwick	Howard Brenton	23 June 2003 (BBC Three) (Note: "I Spy Apocalypse" was rebroadcast on BBC One two weeks after its original BBC Three broadcast, on 7 July 2003.)	6.30
12	6	"Without Incident" "President's Visit"	Justin Chadwick	David Wolstencroft	7 July 2003 (BBC Three)	6.00 (Note: Official data for the consolidated viewing figures for that week was not made available on the BARB website, only overnight ratings data would be available)
13	7	"Clean Skin"	Ciaran Donnelly	Simon Mirren	14 July 2003 (BBC Three)	6.90
14	8	"Strike Force" "Military Strikes"	Ciaran Donnelly	Steve Bailie	21 July 2003 (BBC Three)	6.68
15	9	"The Seventh Division" "A Very Corporate Coup"	Sam Miller	Ben Richards	28 July 2003 (BBC Three)	6.92
16	10	"Smoke and Mirrors" "Pit of Secrets"	Sam Miller	Howard Brenton	11 August 2003 (BBC One)	7.32

=== Series 3 (2004) ===
No. overall	No. in series	Title	Directed by	Written by	Original release date	UK viewers (millions)
17	1	"Project Friendly Fire"	Jonny Campbell	Howard Brenton	11 October 2004 (BBC One)	6.77
18	2	"The Sleeper"	Jonny Campbell	Howard Brenton	16 October 2004 (BBC Three) (Note: "The Sleeper" on 18 October 2004 on BBC One; the rest of the series would continue on BBC One two days after the BBC Three broadcast.)	6.48
19	3	"Who Guards the Guards?"	Cilla Ware	Rupert Walters	23 October 2004 (BBC Three)	6.49
20	4	"A Prayer for My Daughter"	Cilla Ware	Ben Richards	30 October 2004 (BBC Three)	6.33
21	5	"Love and Death"	Justin Chadwick	David Wolstencroft	6 November 2004 (BBC Three)	5.00
22	6	"Persephone"	Justin Chadwick	Ben Richards	13 November 2004 (BBC Three)	5.46
23	7	"Outsiders"	Bill Anderson	Raymond Khoury	20 November 2004 (BBC Three)	5.74
24	8	"Celebrity"	Bill Anderson	Howard Brenton	27 November 2004 (BBC Three)	5.19
25	9	"Frequently Asked Questions"	Alrick Riley	Rupert Walters	4 December 2004 (BBC Three)	4.92
26	10	"The Suffering of Strangers"	Alrick Riley	Ben Richards	13 December 2004 (BBC One)	5.33

=== Series 4 (2005) ===
No. overall	No. in series	Title	Directed by	Written by	Original release date	UK viewers (millions)
27	1	"The Special (Part 1)"	Antonia Bird	Ben Richards	12 September 2005 (BBC One)	6.63
28	2	"The Special (Part 2)"	Antonia Bird	Ben Richards	13 September 2005 (BBC One)	6.84
29	3	"Divided They Fall"	Alrick Riley	Ben Richards	15 September 2005 (BBC Three) (Note: "Divided They Fall" was broadcast on 22 September 2005 on BBC One; the rest of the series (apart from the finale) would usually rebroadcast on BBC One seven days after the BBC Three broadcast.)	6.50
30	4	"Road Trip"	Alrick Riley	Howard Brenton	22 September 2005 (BBC Three)	5.21
31	5	"The Book"	Jeremy Lovering	Raymond Khoury	29 September 2005 (BBC Three)	5.20
32	6	"The Innocent"	Jeremy Lovering	David Farr	6 October 2005 (BBC Three)	5.83
33	7	"Syria"	Omar Madha	Raymond Khoury	13 October 2005 (BBC Three)	5.74
34	8	"The Russian"	Omar Madha	Howard Brenton	20 October 2005 (BBC Three)	6.34
35	9	"The Sting"	Julian Simpson	Rupert Walters	27 October 2005 (BBC Three)	5.98
36	10	"Diana"	Julian Simpson	Howard Brenton	10 November 2005 (BBC One)	6.18

=== Series 5 (2006) ===
No. overall	No. in series	Title	Directed by	Written by	Original release date	UK viewers (millions)
37	1	"Gas and Oil (Part 1)"	Omar Madha	Ben Richards	17 September 2006 (BBC One)	6.31
38	2	"Gas and Oil (Part 2)"	Omar Madha	Ben Richards	17 September 2006 (BBC Three) (Note: "Gas and Oil (Part 2)" was broadcast on 18 September 2006 on BBC One; the rest of the series (apart from the finale) would usually rebroadcast on BBC One seven days after the BBC Three broadcast.)	5.75
39	3	"The Cell"	Julian Simpson	Ben Richards	18 September 2006 (BBC Three)	6.12
40	4	"World Trade"	Kenny Glenaan	David Farr	25 September 2006 (BBC Three)	5.79
41	5	"The Message"	Kenny Glenaan	Zinnie Harris	2 October 2006 (BBC Three)	5.89
42	6	"Hostage Takers (Part 1)"	Andy Hay	Raymond Khoury	9 October 2006 (BBC Three)	6.05
43	7	"Hostage Takers (Part 2)"	Andy Hay	Raymond Khoury	16 October 2006 (BBC Three)	5.53
44	8	"Agenda"	Julian Simpson	Julian Simpson	23 October 2006 (BBC Three)	5.97
45	9	"The Criminal"	Julian Holmes	Neil Cross	30 October 2006 (BBC Three)	5.80
46	10	"Aftermath"	Julian Holmes	David Farr	13 November 2006 (BBC One)	6.47

=== Series 6 (2007) ===
No. overall	No. in series	Title	Directed by	Written by	Original release date	UK viewers (millions)
47	1	"The Virus (Part 1)"	Omar Madha	Neil Cross	16 October 2007 (BBC One)	6.61
48	2	"The Virus (Part 2)"	Omar Madha	Neil Cross	16 October 2007 (BBC Three) (Note: "The Virus, Part 2" airs right after "Part 1" on BBC Three; The series would continue on BBC One a week after the BBC Three broadcast)	5.78
49	3	"The Kidnap"	Charles Beeson	Rupert Walters	23 October 2007 (BBC Three)	6.12
50	4	"The Extremist"	Charles Beeson	David Farr	30 October 2007 (BBC Three)	5.62
51	5	"The Deal"	Brendan Maher	Zinnie Harris	6 November 2007 (BBC Three)	5.58
52	6	"The Courier"	Brendan Maher	George Tiffin	13 November 2007 (BBC Three)	5.30
53	7	"The Broadcast"	Stefan Schwartz	David Farr	20 November 2007 (BBC Three)	4.94
54	8	"Infiltration"	Stefan Schwartz	Neil Cross	27 November 2007 (BBC Three)	5.26
55	9	"Isolated"	Alrick Riley	Neil Cross	4 December 2007 (BBC Three)	4.84
56	10	"The School"	Alrick Riley	Ben Richards	18 December 2007 (BBC One)	5.68

=== Series 7 (2008) ===
No. overall	No. in series	Title	Directed by	Written by	Original release date	UK viewers (millions)
57	1	"New Allegiances"	Colm McCarthy	Neil Cross & Ben Richards	27 October 2008 (BBC One)	5.91
58	2	"Split Loyalties"	Colm McCarthy	Neil Cross & Ben Richards	27 October 2008 (BBC Three) (Note: "Split Loyalties" on 28 October 2008 on BBC One; the rest of the series would continue on BBC One a week after the BBC Three broadcast)	5.63
59	3	"The Tip-Off"	Peter Hoar	Russell Lewis & Ben Richards	28 October 2008 (BBC Three)	5.59
60	4	"A Chance for Peace"	Peter Hoar	Richard McBrien	3 November 2008 (BBC Three)	5.29
61	5	"On the Brink"	Edward Hall	Christian Spurrier	10 November 2008 (BBC Three)	5.21
62	6	"Accidental Discovery"	Edward Hall	David Farr	17 November 2008 (BBC Three)	5.14
63	7	"The Mole"	Sam Miller	James Moran & Christian Spurrier	24 November 2008 (BBC Three)	5.00
64	8	"Nuclear Strike"	Sam Miller	Neil Cross	8 December 2008 (BBC One)	5.95

=== Series 8 (2009) ===
No. overall	No. in series	Title	Directed by	Written by	Original release date	UK viewers (millions)
65	1	"Episode 1"	Alrick Riley	Story by : Zinnie Harris and Ben Richards; Teleplay by : Ben Richards	4 November 2009 (BBC One)	6.55
66	2	"Episode 2"	Alrick Riley	Story by : Zinnie Harris and Ben Richards; Teleplay by : Ben Richards	6 November 2009 (BBC Three) (Note: "Series 8, Episode 2" onward would air from 11 November 2009 onwards on BBC One)	5.11
67	3	"Episode 3"	Sam Miller	Christian Spurrier and Sean Reilly	13 November 2009 (BBC Three)	5.26
68	4	"Episode 4"	Sam Miller	David Farr	20 November 2009 (BBC Three)	5.18
69	5	"Episode 5"	Alrick Riley	Richard McBrien	27 November 2009 (BBC Three)	4.39
70	6	"Episode 6"	Edward Hall	Dennis Kelly	4 December 2009 (BBC Three)	5.11
71	7	"Episode 7"	Edward Hall	James Dormer	11 December 2009 (BBC Three)	3.99 (Note: The episode did not appear in the top 30 viewings on the BARB website, only overnight ratings data would be available)
72	8	"Episode 8"	Alrick Riley	Ben Richards	23 December 2009 (BBC One)	5.91

=== Series 9 (2010) ===
No. overall	No. in series	Title	Directed by	Written by	Original release date	UK viewers (millions)
73	1	"Episode 1"	Paul Whittington	Jonathan Brackley & Sam Vincent	20 September 2010	6.74
74	2	"Episode 2"	Michael Caton-Jones	David Farr	27 September 2010	6.27
75	3	"Episode 3"	Michael Caton-Jones	Richard McBrien	4 October 2010	6.04
76	4	"Episode 4"	Paul Whittington	Jonathan Brackley & Sam Vincent	11 October 2010	6.37
77	5	"Episode 5"	Julian Holmes	Jonathan Brackley & Sam Vincent & Oliver Brown	18 October 2010	6.35
78	6	"Episode 6"	Julian Holmes	Jonathan Brackley & Sam Vincent	25 October 2010	6.36
79	7	"Episode 7"	Edward Hall	Anthony Neilson	1 November 2010	6.10
80	8	"Episode 8"	Edward Hall	Jonathan Brackley & Sam Vincent	8 November 2010	6.40

=== Series 10 (2011) ===
No. overall	No. in series	Title	Directed by	Written by	Original release date	UK viewers (millions)
81	1	"Episode 1"	Alrick Riley	Jonathan Brackley & Sam Vincent	18 September 2011	5.63
82	2	"Episode 2"	Alrick Riley	Jonathan Brackley & Sam Vincent	25 September 2011	5.12
83	3	"Episode 3"	Julian Homes	Jonathan Brackley & Sam Vincent	2 October 2011	5.15
84	4	"Episode 4"	Julian Holmes	Sean Cook	9 October 2011	5.31
85	5	"Episode 5"	Bharat Nalluri	Jonathan Brackley & Sam Vincent & Anthony Neilson	16 October 2011	5.27
86	6	"Episode 6"	Bharat Nalluri	Jonathan Brackley & Sam Vincent	23 October 2011	5.95

== Ratings ==
Spooks : UK viewers per episode (millions)

Season	Episode number									
Season	1	2	3	4	5	6	7	8	9	10
1	9.60	8.10	7.30	5.99	6.75	7.21	–			
2	8.16	7.87	7.18	7.38	6.30	6.00	6.90	6.68	6.92	7.32
3	6.77	6.48	6.49	6.33	5.00	5.46	5.74	5.19	4.92	5.33
4	6.63	6.84	6.50	5.21	5.20	5.83	5.74	6.34	5.98	6.18
5	6.31	5.75	6.12	5.79	5.89	6.05	5.53	5.97	5.80	6.47
6	6.61	5.78	6.12	5.62	5.58	5.30	4.94	5.26	4.84	5.68
7	5.91	5.63	5.59	5.29	5.21	5.14	5.00	5.95	–	
8	6.55	5.11	5.26	5.18	4.39	5.11	3.99	5.91	–	
9	6.74	6.27	6.04	6.37	6.35	6.36	6.10	6.40	–	
10	5.63	5.12	5.15	5.31	5.27	5.95	–			

Audience measurement performed by Broadcasters' Audience Research Board

== Home video releases ==
Series	DVD release dates		
Series	Region 1	Region 2	Region 4
1	13 January 2004	16 June 2003	18 August 2003
2	11 January 2005	20 September 2004	21 March 2004
3	31 January 2006	5 September 2005	23 May 2005
4	9 January 2007	4 September 2006	21 May 2007
5	8 January 2008	10 September 2007	19 May 2008
6	20 January 2009	6 October 2008	4 August 2008
7	26 January 2010	12 October 2008	1 April 2009
8	25 January 2011	20 September 2010	3 November 2010
9	12 July 2011	28 February 2011	31 May 2011
10	6 March 2012	28 November 2011	4 April 2012
