= Roger Yuan =

American stuntman and actor

- Born: Roger Winston Tzi-Chun Yuan; January 25, 1961 (age 65); Carbondale, Illinois, U.S.
- Occupations: Martial artist, stunt coordinator, stunt performer, actor
- Years active: 1982–present
- Relatives: Ron Yuan (brother)

Chinese name
- Chinese: 袁之正
Transcriptions
Standard Mandarin
- Hanyu Pinyin: Yuán Zhīzhèng

Roger Winston Tzi-Chun Yuan (born January 25, 1961) is an American martial artist, stuntman, actor, and fight choreographer. He won an Actor Award for Outstanding Action Performance by a Stunt Ensemble in a Motion Picture for his work on the James Bond film Skyfall (2012), with four additional nominations. He has also worked on films such as Black Dynamite (2009), Jason Bourne (2016), Dune (2021) and its sequels.

== Early life ==
Yuan was born in Carbondale, Illinois, to Taiwanese parents Theresa and Joseph Yuan, who were in the United States to study at the Southern Illinois University Carbondale. Yuan was sent back to Taiwan as an infant to live with his grandparents, before moving back to America at the age of 5, living with his parents in New York City. He was inspired to pursue martial arts after seeing Bruce Lee on The Green Hornet.

Though he taught himself karate and judo from manuals, he did not begin a formal martial arts education until the age of 17, when he enrolled in a Kyokushin Karate class. After moving to Los Angeles for college, he enrolled in a Chun Kuk Do dojo under the direction of Chuck Norris' United Fighting Arts Federation (UFAF), eventually attaining a fourth dan black belt. He subsequently studied American kickboxing under Benny Urquidez, where he was a sparring partner for Pete "Sugarfoot" Cunningham, and also trained with Bill Wallace and Don "The Dragon" Wilson.

Yuan has also trained in Wing Chun, Muay Thai, taekwondo, and qigong, as well as gymnastics and yoga. He has a blue belt in Brazilian Jiu-Jitsu.

== Career ==
As of 2024, Yuan has performed stunts in over 40 films, including: Rapid Fire, Escape from L.A., Spawn, Blade, Warcraft, Jason Bourne, John Wick: Chapter 3 – Parabellum, Dune, and Dune: Part Two.

In 2011, he trained Jennifer Lawrence and Jason Flemyng in X-Men: First Class as well as Henry Cavill in Immortals. He also trained Keanu Reeves in 47 Ronin.

Yuan's first stunt double stint came in the 1986 film House. His first role as a professional actor is in The Perfect Weapon (1991), Yuan's first credited acting debut is in Red Corner (1997), alongside Richard Gere. He also appeared in Lethal Weapon 4, which is Jet Li's American film debut, as the role of Chu, a Chinese Triad gangster. In 2000, he played the main antagonist in the Western action-comedy Shanghai Noon alongside Jackie Chan, as the corrupt Imperial Guard Lo Fong; this role helped him become popular with audiences. In 2003, he appeared in the beginning of Bulletproof Monk, playing Chow Yun-fat's master. In Batman Begins, he appeared as the Hazmat Technician alongside Gary Oldman and as the Chinese Engineer in Syriana. In Skyfall, he also trained Daniel Craig and had a role as Sévérine's bodyguard. Yuan also appeared in many TV series, including Walker Texas Ranger, where he played multiple characters, with his most famous role being Lazarus in the episodes 'The Winds of Change' and 'Lazarus'.

In 2016, he starred in Crouching Tiger, Hidden Dragon: Sword of Destiny, the sequel of the successful 2000 film Crouching Tiger, Hidden Dragon. Besides working in the film industry, he also was invited by Country singer Tim McGraw to get him in shape for his 2012 Brothers of the Sun Tour.

== Personal life ==
Yuan's brother, Ron Yuan, is also a martial artist and stuntman.

Yuan was based in Ireland for 15 years.

== Filmography ==
Key
†	Denotes films that have not yet been released

=== Film ===
Year	Title	Contributed to		Role	Notes
Year	Title	Acting	Stunts	Role	Notes
1985	House	No	Yes	—N/a	Stunt performer
1991	American Kickboxer	Yes	Yes	Howard	Assistant fight choreographer
1991	The Perfect Weapon	Yes	No	Diamond	
1991	Showdown in Little Tokyo	Yes	No	Kickboxer	
1991	No Secrets	No	Yes	—N/a	Martial arts advisor
1992	American Streetfighter	Yes	No	Ito	
1992	Rapid Fire	No	Yes	—N/a	Stunt performer
1992	Rage and Honor	Yes	No	Dave	
1993	Ulterior Motives	Yes	No	Yakuza	
1993	Shootfighter: Fight to the Death	Yes	No	Po	
1993	Son of the Pink Panther	No	Yes	—N/a	Martial arts trainer
1994	Ring of Steel	Yes	No	Ninja	
1994	Death Match	Yes	No	Fighter	
1994	Double Dragon	Yes	Yes	Ninja Wraith	Stunt performer
1995	Mighty Morphin Power Rangers: The Movie	No	Yes	—N/a	Stunt double: David Yost
1996	Space Truckers	No	Yes	—N/a	Stunt performer
1997	Once Upon a Time in China and America	Yes	No	Dick	
1997	Beverly Hills Ninja	No	Yes	—N/a	Stunt performer
1997	Drive	No	Yes	—N/a	Stunt performer
1997	Spawn	Yes	Yes	North Korean Soldier	Stunt performer
1997	Red Corner	Yes	No	Huan Minglu	
1998	Blade	No	Yes	—N/a	Stunt performer
1998	Lethal Weapon 4	Yes	No	Chu	
2000	Shanghai Noon	Yes	No	Lo Fong	
2001	The Silent Force	Yes	No	Jimmy Thai	
2003	Bulletproof Monk	Yes	No	Master Monk	
2004	Ella Enchanted	No	Yes	—N/a	Stunt performer / fight choreographer
2004	Home on the Range	Yes	No	Additional Voice	
2005	Batman Begins	Yes	No	Hazmat Technician	
2005	Syriana	Yes	No	Chinese Engineer	
2005	Vampires: The Turning	Yes	No	Kiko	
2007	Strength and Honour	No	Yes	—N/a	Fight coordinator
2008	The Fifth Commandment	Yes	No	Z	
2009	Blood and Bone	No	Yes	—N/a	
2009	Chandni Chowk to China	Yes	No	Inspector Chiang Kohung	
2009	Black Dynamite	Yes	Yes	Fiendish Dr. Wu	Fight coordinator
2010	Shanghai Blue	Yes	No	Husband	
2011	X-Men: First Class	No	Yes	—N/a	Stunt performer
2011	Immortals	No	Yes	—N/a	Trainer: Henry Cavill
2012	Skyfall	Yes	Yes	Severine's Bodyguard	Fight trainer
2013	Once Upon a Time in Vietnam	Yes	Yes	General Long	Action consultant
2013	47 Ronin	No	Yes	—N/a	Fight trainer
2016	Warcraft	No	Yes	—N/a	Fight coordinator / associate stunt coordinator
2016	Jason Bourne	No	Yes	—N/a	Fight coordinator
2016	Crouching Tiger, Hidden Dragon: Sword of Destiny	Yes	No	Iron Crow	
2017	American Assassin	No	Yes	—N/a	Fight trainer
2018	Accident Man	Yes	No	Swordmaster	
2018	Blindsided	Yes	No	Gordon	Short film
2018	Venom	Yes	No	Village Eel Shop Owner	
2019	John Wick: Chapter 3 – Parabellum	Yes	Yes	Huang	Stunt performer
2020	Mulan	Yes	No	Duba Tegin	
2020	The Paper Tigers	Yes	No	Sifu Cheung	
2021	Dune	Yes	Yes	Lieutenant Lanville	Fight coordinator
2023	Outlaw Johnny Black	Yes	No	Lee	
2023	The Machine	No	Yes	—N/a	Stunt coordinator
2024	Dune: Part Two	Yes	Yes	Lieutenant Lanville	Fight coordinator / stunt coordinator
2026	Dune: Part Three †	No	Yes	—N/a	Fight coordinator Post-production

=== Television ===
Year	Title	Functioned as		Role	Notes
Year	Title	Acting	Stunts	Role	Notes
1993–2000	Walker, Texas Ranger	Yes	No	Various	5 episodes
1994	Vanishing Son	Yes	Yes	Button Man	TV movie Fight choreographer / stunt performer
1994	Vanishing Son II	No	Yes	—N/a	TV movie Fight choreographer / stunt performer
1994	Vanishing Son III	No	Yes	—N/a	TV movie Fight choreographer / stunt performer
1994	Vanishing Son IV	No	Yes	—N/a	TV movie Fight choreographer / stunt performer
1994	Renegade	Yes	No	Glen Kawahowa / The Black Wind	Episode: "Black Wind"
1995	Vanishing Son: The Series	No	Yes	—N/a	9 episodes Fight coordinator
1997	Tracey Takes On...	Yes	No	Guard at Palace	Episode: "Childhood"
1998	Brimstone	Yes	No	Da Ming Po	Episode: "Poem"
1999	Nash Bridges	Yes	No	Mr. Lee	Episode: "Girl Trouble"
2001	The District	Yes	No	Tuan Tran	Episode: "New World"
2002	Red Skies	Yes	No	Zhao Lo	TV movie
2003	Angel	Yes	No	Wo-Pang	Season 4; 2 episodes
2008	Fifth Street	Yes	No	Vincent	Short film
2009	Spooks	Yes	No	Heng	Series 8, Episode 8
2010	CSI: Miami	Yes	No	Takashi Yamada	Episode: "Die by the Sword"
2011	Camelot	No	Yes	—N/a	Episode: "Homecoming"; Stunt performer
2018	Hawaii Five-O	Yes	Yes	Kang	Episode: "Ka ‘owili’oka’i"
2023	The Continental: From the World of John Wick	No	Yes	—N/a	Miniseries; Fight coordinator

== Awards and nominations ==
Institution	Year	Category	Work	Result
Actor Awards	2012	Outstanding Action Performance by a Stunt Ensemble in a Motion Picture	X-Men: First Class	Nominated
Actor Awards	2013	Outstanding Action Performance by a Stunt Ensemble in a Motion Picture	Skyfall	Won
Actor Awards	2017	Outstanding Action Performance by a Stunt Ensemble in a Motion Picture	Jason Bourne	Nominated
Actor Awards	2022	Outstanding Action Performance by a Stunt Ensemble in a Motion Picture	Dune	Nominated
Actor Awards	2025	Outstanding Action Performance by a Stunt Ensemble in a Motion Picture	Dune: Part Two	Nominated
Austin Film Critics Association	2025	Best Stunt Work	Dune: Part Two	Nominated
Denver Film Critics Society	2025	Best Stunts	Dune: Part Two	Nominated
Houston Film Critics Society	2025	Best Stunt Coordination	Dune: Part Two	Nominated
Seattle Film Critics Society	2024	Best Action Choreography	Dune: Part Two	Nominated
Washington D.C. Area Film Critics Association	2024	Best Stunts	Dune: Part Two	Nominated
