= Whitechapel (TV series) =

Television series

- First series titlecard
- Genre: Police procedural Thriller
- Written by: Ben Court, Caroline Ip and Steve Pemberton.
- Directed by: S.J. Clarkson; David Evans; John Strickland; Richard Clark; Jon East; Daniel Nettheim
- Starring: Rupert Penry-Jones; Phil Davis; Steve Pemberton
- Composer: Ruth Barrett
- Country of origin: United Kingdom
- Original language: English
- No. of series: 4
- No. of episodes: 18 (list of episodes)

Production
- Executive producer: Sally Woodward Gentle
- Producers: Marcus Wilson; David Boulter
- Cinematography: Balazs Bolygo; Kieran McGuigan
- Editors: Liana Del Giudice; Anthony Combes
- Running time: 45 minutes (excluding adverts)
- Production company: Carnival Films

Original release
- Network: ITV
- Release: 2 February 2009 – 9 October 2013

Whitechapel is a British police procedural, produced by Carnival Films for ITV and distributed by BBC Worldwide, in which detectives in London's Whitechapel district deal with murders which replicated historical crimes. The first series was broadcast in the UK on 2 February 2009 and depicted the search for a modern copycat killer replicating the murders of Jack the Ripper.

A second series was commissioned by ITV in September 2009 with the focus on the Kray twins. The first episode of this second series was broadcast on 11 October 2010.

A third series was commissioned by ITV in March 2011, which was extended to six episodes as three two-part stories.

The first and second series were broadcast in the United States on six consecutive Wednesday evenings beginning 26 October 2011 on the BBC America cable network. The third was broadcast in the US starting on Wednesday 28 March 2012, also on BBC America.

On 24 September 2012, ITV renewed Whitechapel for a fourth and final series consisting of six episodes. The first episode was broadcast on 4 September 2013.

On 16 November 2013, lead actor Rupert Penry-Jones confirmed that ITV had decided not to recommission the show.

== Main cast ==
The show's main cast: Phil Davis, Rupert Penry-Jones and Steve Pemberton

- Rupert Penry-Jones as D.I. Joseph Chandler
- Phil Davis as D.S. Ray Miles
- Steve Pemberton as Edward Buchan
- Christopher Fulford as D.C. Fitzgerald (Series 1)
- Johnny Harris as D.C. Sanders (Series 1)
- Sam Stockman as D.C. Emerson Kent
- George Rossi as D.C. John McCormack (Series 1–2)
- Alex Jennings as Commander Anderson (Series 1–2)
- Claire Rushbrook as Dr Caroline Llewellyn
- Ben Bishop as D.C. Finlay Mansell (Series 2–4)
- Hannah Walters as D.C. Megan Riley (Series 3–4)

=== Connections to the Whitechapel murders case ===
The names of some of the characters are drawn from real people associated with the Whitechapel murders case committed by Jack the Ripper. Joseph Chandler was a Police Inspector who was the first officer to arrive at the scene of the death of Annie Chapman. Edward Buchan was a contemporary suspect for the murders who committed suicide on the day of Mary Jane Kelly's funeral. Mary Bousfield was Martha Tabram's landlady. John McCormack was the lover of suspected ripper victim Alice McKenzie. A Dr Llewellyn was called to the scene of the murder of Mary Ann Nichols. The Assistant Commissioner of the Metropolitan Police, and head of the Criminal Investigation Department at the time of the murders was named Robert Anderson, he was the highest ranking officer to work on the cases. John Fitzgerald confessed to the murder of Annie Chapman which was later proved untrue.

== Series overview ==
Series	Episodes	Originally released	
Series	Episodes	First released	Last released
1	3	2 February 2009	16 February 2009
2	3	11 October 2010	25 October 2010
3	6	30 January 2012	27 February 2012
4	6	4 September 2013	9 October 2013

== Episode list ==
=== Series 1 (2009) ===
Guest starring;

- Paul Hickey as David Cohen, a doctor at the local hospital.
- Sally Leonard as Frances Coles, one of the intended murder victims.
- Simon Tcherniak as John Phillips, Frances' boyfriend.
- Branko Tomović as Antoni Pricha, one of the main suspects in the new Jack the Ripper case.
- Sophie Stanton as Mary Bousfield, a police officer and victim of the new Ripper.
- Jane Riley as Sarah Smith, a key witness in the enquiry.
- Ben Loyd-Holmes as Private John Leary, the first suspect in the Ripper case.

Series one and two were broadcast as a single six-episode season on BBC America, and were subsequently released on DVD as such. For the BBC America DVD release, the two stories were given individual titles, with series one being entitled: The Walk of Terror (Parts 1–3) respectively.

No.	Title	Directed by	Written by	Original release date	Viewers (millions)
1	"Part 1"	S. J. Clarkson	Ben Court and Caroline Ip	2 February 2009	9.26
As the final step before promotion, fast-tracker DI Joseph Chandler is posted to Whitechapel by Commander Anderson to lead the investigation into the murder of a woman. However, the case does not turn out as straightforward as Chandler had hoped. The victim, Cathy Lane, is found by CSO Mary Bousfield, bleeding to death with her throat cut in the yard of a Board School, with the killer watching only a short distance away. The Whitechapel squad—front-line, hard-bitten DS Ray Miles and DCs Kent, McCormack, Sanders and Fitzgerald—arrive at the scene after Cathy is pronounced dead and are less than pleased to hear of the imminent arrival of yet another new DI, a 'plastic', a 'paper policeman' who has no idea what he is doing. Chandler arrives, armed with the knowledge of his courses and text books, ready to solve his first murder.
2	"Part 2"	S. J. Clarkson	Ben Court and Caroline Ip	9 February 2009	8.20
As it is clear this case is no longer a straightforward murder that Chandler can wrap up quickly, he is summoned to see Commander Anderson and his superiors who are very concerned that London may have a Jack the Ripper copycat – especially the impact of this leaking to the press. They tell Chandler he is on his own and that he must solve this case quickly. Having earned a small degree of grudging respect, Chandler leads his squad as they begin researching Jack the Ripper, reading books and looking at DVDs, in an attempt to discover who the new Ripper may be. It is a race against time before he strikes again and they have nothing to go on, except what history tells them, and matters are not helped when one of the team, trying to oust Chandler, leaks details of the case to the press.
3	"Part 3"	S. J. Clarkson	Ben Court and Caroline Ip	16 February 2009	8.72
Chandler has a close encounter with the murderous impostor but fails to catch or follow him; only the timely appearance of a passer-by allows him to escape with his life. His attacker's home, however contains enough clues for the final hunt to begin after the team find the Ripper's apartment. There, finding out that he assumed numerous disguises throughout their case to undermine them incognito, they deduce his most startling alias: David Cohen. With time running out fast, Chandler and Miles manage to find and stop the Ripper before he completes his recreation of the murder of Mary Jane Kelly. However, Chandler remains to look after a seriously wounded Miles while the Ripper escapes and later commits suicide.

=== Series 2 (2010) ===
Guest starring;

- Peter Serafinowicz as DCI Cazenove, the corrupt Head of the Organised Crime Division.
- Craig Parkinson as Jimmy and Johnny Kray, the heirs to the legacy of the original Kray twins.
- Chrissie Cotterill as Angie Brooks, mother of the Kray twins.
- Andrew Tiernan as Steven Dukes, a local gangster who helped the Krays rise to power.

Series one and two were broadcast as a single six-episode season on BBC America, and were subsequently released on DVD as such. For the BBC America DVD release, the two stories were given individual titles, with series two being entitled: The Legend Rising (Parts 1–3) respectively.

No.	Title	Directed by	Written by	Original release date	Viewers (millions) (Note: Sourced by BARB; figures include ITV1 HD)
1	"Part 1"	David Evans	Ben Court and Caroline Ip	11 October 2010	7.00
Since the events of the Ripper case, Chandler is now permanently stationed at Whitechapel with Miles, McCormack and Kent. Fitzgerald has been demoted to PC with his position taken over by DC Finley Mansell. Deemed failures as a result of their inability to catch the Ripper, they are low down in the pecking order in comparison to the Organised Crime Division (OCD) run by DCI Cazenove, lauded for reducing street crime to negligible. The team bemoan the fact that there are no murders. Chandler's interest is piqued, however, when Anderson informs him another big case will find him soon. A dead body is soon discovered floating in the Thames, and a series of horrific attacks follow which appear to echo the Kray twins' infamous crimes of the 1960s. Despite Buchan's timely advice, Chandler suspects the local gangster Steven Dukes to be the mastermind, only to realise that he is facing a criminal duo seeking bloody revenge for the Krays' incarceration.
2	"Part 2"	David Evans	Ben Court and Caroline Ip	18 October 2010	6.52
A man is murdered in an old haunt of the Kray Twins, a pub called 'The Blind Beggar' in Whitechapel, the scene of a similar murder by Ronnie Kray in 1966. The barmaid says that the killer was Jimmy Kray and that he lives down the road with his mother, Angie Brooks. Chandler and Miles interview Angie, who reveals she visited Ronnie Kray in Broadmoor and he provided her with a sperm sample with which she became pregnant with identical twins, Jimmy and Johnny Kray. Dr Llewellyn explains forensics will not show which twin is the killer, so they need to investigate the Krays the old-fashioned way. Chandler's investigations rattle the twins and he's bundled into a car for a meeting, learning that Jimmy is clearly insane and Johnny is finding it hard to control him when he turned down their offer of backing off. The team's perseverance leads them into personal danger; Miles' son is threatened and Kent is terrorized by uniformed officers on the twins' payroll. Mansell receives a wreath delivered at his home, McCormack has a gun pointed at his head and Chandler is beaten before being dumped in Epping Forest. At rock bottom, Chandler asks for Buchan's help and takes his advice to use Jimmy's insanity to separate the twins. However, learning that Fitzgerald is on the twins' payroll, the meeting with Johnny goes awry while he and his brother rake the pub with automatic fire. Inside, Chandler spots a gun and fires back. When their ammunition is spent, the twins leave. Fitzgerald is arrested soon after while warning Chandler that he is the only one trying to stop the twins and is on borrowed time.
3	"Part 3"	David Evans	Ben Court and Caroline Ip	25 October 2010	6.03
After the shooting, Chandler instructs Miles to drive to Anderson's house. While Anderson and Chandler talk, Miles becomes worried when the only person he can't reach is McCormack. Racing to his house, they find him hanging in his garden shed. Llewellyn rules that the death is a suicide. McCormack's death appears to mark the end of the inquiry, but it's all for show. The investigation moves to a secret location, Buchan's house, which will be the new incident room. Anderson can only hold the Krays off for three days and they are only too aware that they have no witnesses, no evidence and no leads. They link Ronnie Kray's liking for young boys with Jimmy Kray's "Blond Boy". When the "Blond Boy" reveals himself as a girl, the team wonder what else is fake about these twins. Managing to obtain DNA of Ronnie and Jimmy, Chandler's group manages to confirm that their Kray twins are not related to the originals. Using this information to coax Dukes' support in exposing their organization, the Krays are arrested while it is revealed that only their mother Angie knew the truth and lied to them about Ronnie being their father. However, the Krays are assassinated while in custody with Anderson taking advantage of the resulting power vacuum within the police department. Soon after, Anderson accepts Chandler's request to set up a special team.

=== Series 3 (2012) ===
Whitechapel was commissioned for a third series in March 2011, but unlike the previous two series, which were each based on a single event, the new series was split into three separate two-part stories, which each focused on a different case. For the BBC America DVD releases, the three stories were given individual titles: The Murder in Darkness, The Hunger for Mercy and The Sins of Betrayal respectively.

No.	Title	Directed by	Written by	Original release date	Viewers (millions) (Note: Sourced by BARB; includes ITV1 HD and ITV1 +1)
1	"Case One:Part 1"	John Strickland	Ben Court and Caroline Ip	30 January 2012	7.35
2	"Case One:Part 2"	John Strickland	Ben Court and Caroline Ip	6 February 2012	6.88
Part One: Chandler and Miles investigate the slaughter of four people at a tailor's fortified workshop. Buchan, retained by Chandler as the team's historical adviser, believes that the huge archive at Whitechapel station will provide the necessary insight into the baffling crime, that appears to echo the Ratcliff Highway murders two-hundred years earlier. However, with no obvious point of access, both Chandler and Miles are puzzled as to how the killer would have committed the crimes without being seen. Part Two: When a second mass murder occurs, the M.O. matches the first case - again there was no obvious break-in and no forensic evidence to identify the killer. Chandler and Miles then discover that in both cases, food and drink was known to have been disappearing from the fridge days before the murders, and work out that the killer must have been hiding in the underbelly of the murder scenes, ready to pick the perfect moment to commit the crime. But can they identify the location of his next spree in time? Guest starring: Christina Chong as Lizzie Pepper; David Schneider as Marcus Salter; Caroline O'Neill as Trisha Ingall and Shaun Evans as Sly Driscoll
3	"Case Two:Part 1"	Richard Clark	Ben Court and Caroline Ip	13 February 2012	7.12
4	"Case Two:Part 2"	Richard Clark	Ben Court and Caroline Ip	20 February 2012	6.95
Part One: As Chandler and Miles attend the christening of Miles's daughter, a fox runs through the streets of Whitechapel with a human arm in its mouth. Soon, more body parts from the same victim are washed up by the river, all containing evidence of a fatal poisoning. When limbs of a second victim are uncovered, Buchan believes the crimes echo the Thames torso murders of the 1880s - can the team, with the help of a female DI from South of the river, attractively like Chandler in her habits, crack the gruesome case? Part Two: When traces of the aphrodisiac Spanish fly are found in the bodies of the two murder victims, Chandler and Miles question what kind of killer they could be up against. As further victims come to light, the team are taken to the heart of a dark obsession where they discover that romance and love haven taken a sinister turn, and that the killer is picking his victims based on the appearance of his 'lost love', the driving force behind the murders. But can they catch him before he becomes out of control and strikes again? Guest starring: Camilla Power as DI Mina Norroy; Paul Chequer as Nathan Merceron
5	"Case Three:Part 1"	Jon East	Ben Court and Caroline Ip	27 February 2012	6.78
6	"Case Three:Part 2"	Jon East	Ben Court and Caroline Ip	5 March 2012	7.11
Part One: When a babysitter is murdered, the post mortem reveals that her mobile phone had been thrust down her throat. Shortly afterwards, a second victim is discovered, having had his blood used to cover a wall which he was graffiting on. Chandler, Miles and the team suspect a dangerous patient and former Whitechapel resident, who has recently escaped from a psychiatric unit, and is obsessed with Lon Chaney and the film London After Midnight, where the sins of the victims are used against them during their murder. Part Two: With the body count rising following the murder of a young boy in a police firefight, Miles and Chandler clash over the direction of the investigation. Having already survived the killer's wrath once, Morgan Lamb is of particular interest to the team - especially Chandler. When she is attacked again, miraculously surviving the killer's advances a second time, Miles is certain of her involvement. As the chase escalates, will the team be able to put their differences aside in the face of their toughest adversary yet? Guest starring: Lydia Leonard as Morgan Lamb; Alistair Petrie as Simon Mortlake

=== Series 4 (2013) ===
Whitechapel was commissioned for a fourth series in October 2012, and follows the same format as the third series, featuring three individual cases. For the BBC America DVD releases, the last three stories were given the titles The Real Enemy, The Force of Injustice and To This End, respectively.

No.	Title	Directed by	Written by	Original release date	Viewers (millions) (Note: Sourced by BARB and Broadcast magazine; includes ITV HD and ITV +1)
1	"Case One:Part 1"	Jon East	Ben Court and Caroline Ip	4 September 2013	5.55
2	"Case One:Part 2"	Jon East	Ben Court and Caroline Ip	11 September 2013	4.71
Part One: Chandler and Miles investigate the gruesome murder of an apparent tramp when they discover that the victim was a former spy, forcing the team to cross paths with MI6 as they attempt to discover whether an old adversary of the deceased is responsible. The murder, they discover, is a 16th-century torture, the peine forte et dure, and after a second body is found – an elderly woman burnt at the stake – they realise that someone has started a witch hunt and is now killing suspected witches in Whitechapel. Part Two: As the witch-hunt continues, the team discover that a third victim has disappeared and could be hours from death. They discover that a common link to known witch hunts is ergot poisoning, where the victim has to appease all of those he believes to be responsible for cursing him. Kent and Mansell come to blows during the investigation. Chandler is dissatisfied at the thought he may once again catch the killer on their deathbed. Miles suspects that something is going on in the bowels of the police station. Guest starring: Daisy Beaumont as Stella Knight; David Gant as Alexander Zukanov; Brian Protheroe as Crispin Wingfield
3	"Case Two:Part 1"	Daniel Nettheim	Steve Pemberton	18 September 2013	4.62
4	"Case Two:Part 2"	Daniel Nettheim	Steve Pemberton	25 September 2013	4.26
Part One: The discovery of a flayed face in a Whitechapel gallery sparks the start of a killing spree where the victims are being found with no faces, fingerprints and the skin having been sliced from their back. The first victim, a Russian gangster, was in the midst of attacking a young girl when he was murdered, but the girl describes the killer as having an elderly female appearance. Could the killer really be an old lady? Or is the killer disguising himself with masks of his previous victims, or possibly even something more sinister? Part Two: The team discover that the motives behind the killings lie in criminal cases where the accused have escaped justice. When a fourth victim is discovered barely alive, the team are led to a young boy whose mother was killed in a hit-and-run incident by the victim. Convinced that he is the killer, both Chandler and Miles are shocked when they discover that the only crime he is responsible for is that of a tirade of abuse against the victim. Meanwhile, Buchan's research puts him in danger, and in the midst of the killer. Guest starring: Angela Pleasence as Louise Iver; Mandeep Dhillon as Sabima Masud; John Hodgkinson as Sid Walden
5	"Case Three:Part 1"	Jon East	Ben Court and Caroline Ip	2 October 2013	3.51
6	"Case Three:Part 2"	Jon East	Ben Court and Caroline Ip	9 October 2013	4.13
Part One: Chandler has to pull the team together after an abysmal team-building exercise. Meanwhile, a disembowelled body is discovered in a sewer. The team must establish whether a killer is at large, or if feral swine have returned to London's sewers. When a second victim is pulled into the dreary depths on the way home from work, the team realise that the killer is targeting local 'heroes', all of whom have been interviewed for the local paper. However, they find the journalist's choice of dinner holds a clue to the investigation. Part Two: As further victims emerge, Chandler is forced to take desperate measures when Buchan suggests that the lack of discovery of the victims' missing organs could suggest that cannibals are operating in Whitechapel. When a priest is brutally murdered, a link to a doomsday cult is uncovered, where members of the group believe that eating the organs of innocent souls will save them from an oncoming apocalypse. Will Chandler and the team finally manage to round up the killers before he or she meet their unexpected fate? Guest starring: Angela Pleasence as Louise Iver

== Production ==
The first series was written by Ben Court and Caroline Ip. ITV Director of Drama Laura Mackie said "Whitechapel is a very modern take on the detective genre which combines the Victorian intrigue of the original case with the atmospheric backdrop of a contemporary East End of London. This is not simply about bloodthirstily recreating the Ripper murders, but rather focusing on the three main characters at the heart of the story and the black humour that binds the team together."

== Reception ==
Whitechapel debuted on 2 February 2009 at 9 pm with 8.13 million viewers on the overnight ratings. Series one received positive reviews, and holds a Metacritic score of 75 out of 100, indicating "generally favourable" reviews.

A review in the Leicester Mercury said that it was "Life on Mars, without the time-travel" adding "what Whitechapel lacked in originality, it more than made up for with atmosphere and enthusiasm." After Episode 2 was broadcast on 9 February, Andrew Billen in The Times said that he had warmed to it more and more, adding, "slowly, the show is making Ripperologists of us all, as Jack's 'canonical' murders are separated from the ones he actually committed. It is all in the worst possible taste and bloody good fun." However, The Daily Telegraph was less impressed, writing "The premise was feeble, the script imbecilic, the acting on autopilot, the direction lacking in any glimmer of tension."

Series two received favourable reviews, and holds a Metacritic score of 69 out of 100, indicating "generally favourable" reviews.
