= Adam Carter =

Fictional character from Spooks

- Spooks character
- Rupert Penry-Jones as Adam Carter
- First appearance: "Project Friendly Fire"
- Last appearance: "New Allegiances"
- Portrayed by: Rupert Penry-Jones

In-universe information
- Alias: Ted Baxter; Luke Chivers; Ami Tlass; Roger Thornhill; Nick Harding; Adam Morgan
- Gender: Male
- Title: Chief of Section D
- Occupation: MI5 officer
- Spouse: Fiona Carter (deceased)
- Children: Wes Carter (son)
- Nationality: English

Adam Henry Carter is a fictional character from the BBC espionage television series Spooks, which follows the exploits of Section D, a counter-terrorism division of MI5.

He is portrayed by British actor Rupert Penry-Jones. The character is a former MI6 officer who takes charge as the chief of Section D, and hence the head protagonist following the departure of Tom Quinn in series three.

Adam Carter was created with the knowledge that Matthew Macfadyen, who played Tom Quinn, would leave the series. The intention was that Adam would be different from Tom; the producers wanted a character who was a husband with an MI6 background. Rupert Penry-Jones was cast after three auditions.

Before the sixth series finale aired, it was announced that Penry-Jones would leave the series. In the premiere episode of series seven, Carter is killed in a car bomb. His death was voted the fourth most shocking death in the series. Rupert Penry-Jones was awarded "Best Actor" at the Crime Thriller Awards for his portrayal of Adam Carter.

== Role in Spooks ==
Before joining Section D, Adam Carter was an MI6 officer who served in Serbia, Yemen and specialised in the Middle East. Oliver Mace (Tim McInnerny), chairman of the Joint Intelligence Committee, describes Carter as a "loose cannon". He is a fluent Arabic speaker and has good countersurveillance skills.

In one past operation, Adam worked a case in Damascus to recruit Syrian intelligence officer Farook Sukkarieh as a double agent to work with the Israelis and stop a string of suicide attacks. He used Farook's wife, Fiona (Olga Sosnovska), as a way in. Fiona and Adam subsequently fell in love and started an affair. When Farook discovered this, he had Adam brutally tortured. After he escaped, Adam framed Farook, persuading the Syrians that he was a traitor, and Farook was supposedly hanged for this. Adam subsequently married Fiona and together they had a son, Wes.

Adam first appears in the series three opening episode "Project Friendly Fire", hired by head of Section D Harry Pearce (Peter Firth) to help clear Tom Quinn (Matthew Macfadyen) who has been framed for the assassination of the Chief of the Defence Staff. Ultimately Tom is cleared and returns to duty, only to be decommissioned in the following episode after sabotaging an operation. Harry decides to have Adam transferred to MI5, replacing Tom as head of Section D.

== Conceptual history ==
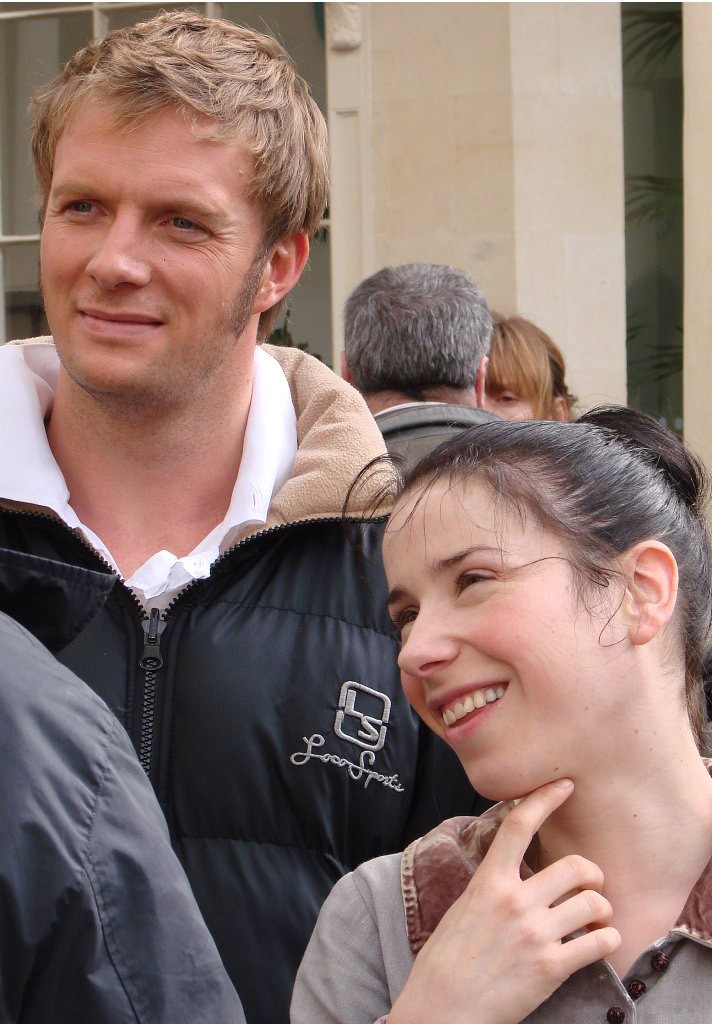
It took the producers months to choose Rupert Penry-Jones as Adam Carter.

The producers were aware that Matthew Macfadyen would leave the series after playing Tom Quinn for two years, and they did not know whether he would return for the first two episodes. An eight- to nine-member team came up with the new character of Adam Carter. They wanted Adam to have a different dynamic than Tom; the producers set up a girlfriend/boyfriend storyline in the first series – with Adam, they wanted him to have a wife (Fiona Carter) who works in the Security Service, since married couples working in that environment are common. They wanted Adam to be more animated and energetic than Tom. Writer Howard Brenton wanted him to have an MI6 background, and have something awful happen to him in the past. Brenton invented the backstory of Syria early on into the third series, which he wanted to revisit in the fourth series.

Early on in the development process, the producers wanted to cast a "brilliant actor" with a strong screen presence. They discussed casting Rupert Penry-Jones for the role of Adam Carter early in the process, though it took months to finally decide to cast him. Though Penry-Jones was aware of Spooks and its success, he had never seen any episodes. To be interested in the role, he spent a weekend catching up on the entire first and second series. He did not take long to decide, since his last leading role was four years previously, in 2000 in the Channel 4 drama North Square. Adam was originally meant to be older, and more "street." When he found acting "street" was too difficult, Penry-Jones acted more like himself. He had to audition three times before the producers included him, four months before filming commenced.

On his first day for filming series three, Penry-Jones participated in a fight scene in the middle of the first episode. He felt a little wary replacing Matthew Macfadyen. After two months of filming, Penry-Jones began to feel more at ease with the role. He felt especially so after he started working for the fourth series. He returned to the fourth series because he thought his character took off by the end of the last series, and wanted to see which direction he would go to next. The crew wanted Adam to go from a "happy-go-lucky" figure to wanting him to deal with things that would make it hard for Adam to be jokey towards the end of the fourth series; this involved Fiona's death.

Before the sixth series finale aired in December 2007, it was announced that Rupert Penry-Jones would leave the series sometime in series seven. He wanted to leave the series as he felt the character had run its course, as well as wanting to explore other venues. He also stated that working in Spooks was "great," but felt he was "getting to the point where I needed to move on." Before the seventh series aired, Penry-Jones revealed his character would leave in what he believed was "one of the best" Spooks exits. He found that his last days on Spooks was generally upsetting and "welled up" on his final day. Penry-Jones did not envisage lasting as long as he did, because he believed the series would not last as long as it has.

== Reception ==
It did take a while for the fans to accept me. I read the blogs, for my sins, and they weren't happy about it.

— Rupert Penry-Jones, on the initial fan reaction towards the character

Rupert Penry-Jones noted that the initial fan reaction towards Adam Carter was negative, "because Matthew [Macfadyen] was so successful and loved." It took a while for fans to accept him. Penry-Jones also felt that his role in Spooks, "definitely took my profile up several notches." In the "best of drama" viewer polls at BBC Online, Penry-Jones was voted third in the "Best Actor" category, beating co-stars Matthew Macfadyen, who was fifth, David Oyelowo, who was seventh, and Peter Firth, who was tenth. He was later voted fifth in 2005, and ninth in 2006.

In a DVD review of the third series of Spooks, Michael Mackenzie of Home Cinema had mixed views of Adam's introduction, stating "despite ardent protests from both cast and crew, Tom and Adam are almost exactly the same character." In the fifth series, Mackenzie felt more open towards Adam, stating Adam Carter "isn't exactly James Bond [...] he doesn't jet around the world, bedding multiple women and engaging in fisticuffs atop precarious construction rigs, but he does rush around London with a gun in his hand and occasionally ends up on the receiving end of the odd beating." David Blackwell of Enterline Media was receptive of Adam in the fourth series, as he felt Adam became "more fleshed out and interesting." However, Blackwell was critical of Adam's role in the following fifth series, stating it is "too much" about him.

Fans and critics alike displayed shock towards the character's death in the first episode of the seventh series. Fans voted Adam's death as the fourth most shocking death scene in the series. The Radio Times stated the shock factor of his death was "spectacular" and said that "driving a primed car bomb to a safe place is so run-of-the-mill for the spooks they wouldn't normally break a sweat. This time, however, it went off. Me-Me-Me.tv has said that Adam's death was "bound to happen" and stated "just when we've formed a deep, meaningful and totally healthy relationship with the lead gentleman [...] they go and blow him up", adding "It's just not fair." The Times's Hilary Rose noted that fans will remember Adam's "dramatic exit", and said that "the nation's women duly went into mourning", regarding that "pretty much every woman with a pulse seems to fancy Rupert." She then noted that some would find "consolation in the shape of new Spooks totty Richard Armitage."

In 2008, Rupert Penry-Jones won a Crime Thriller Award for "Best Actor" for his portrayal as Adam Carter. Penry-Jones won the award against Ashes to Ashes' Philip Glenister, Midnight Man and Murphy's Law's James Nesbitt, The Wire's Dominic West, and Criminal Justice's Ben Whishaw. In the same ceremony, co-star Hermione Norris won "Best Actress".
