= Rupert Penry-Jones =

English actor (born 1970)

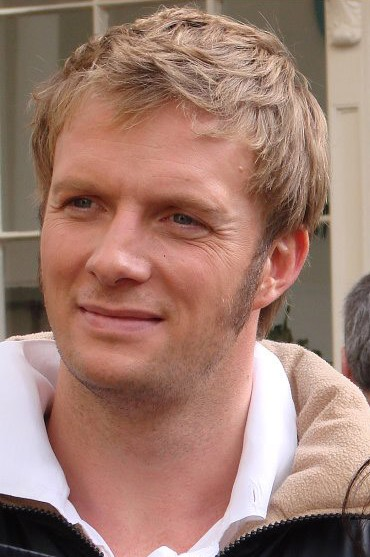
- Penry-Jones in 2006
- Born: Rupert William Penry-Jones; 22 September 1970 (age 55); London, United Kingdom
- Education: Dulwich College; Bristol Old Vic Theatre School
- Occupation: Actor
- Years active: 1994–present
- Spouse: Dervla Kirwan (m. 2007)
- Children: 2
- Parents: Peter Penry-Jones (father); Angela Thorne (mother)

Rupert William Penry-Jones (born 22 September 1970) is an English actor from London. He is known for his performances as Adam Carter in Spooks, Clive Reader in Silk, DI Joseph Chandler in Whitechapel, and Mr. Quinlan in the American horror series The Strain.

== Early life ==
Penry-Jones was born in London on 22 September 1970, the son of Welsh actor Peter Penry-Jones and English actress Angela Thorne. His brother, Laurence Penry-Jones (born in London, 1977), is an actor turned paramedic who is married to actress Polly Walker.

On BBC One's Who Do You Think You Are?, broadcast in August 2010, it was revealed that Penry-Jones' maternal grandfather, William, had served with the Indian Army Medical Corps at the Battle of Monte Cassino and that his earlier ancestors had a long-standing connection with the Indian Army. Penry-Jones also discovered that he had Indian ancestry from the early 19th century.

Penry-Jones was educated at Dulwich College in Dulwich, London, until the age of 19 when he was enrolled at Bristol Old Vic Theatre School. In 2012 he said that he was thrown out of Bristol Old Vic "for having a bad attitude".

== Career ==
In 1995 Penry-Jones appeared with his mother on television in Cold Comfort Farm.

Penry-Jones made his London stage debut at the Hackney Empire theatre in 1995 playing Fortinbras to Ralph Fiennes's Hamlet in an Almeida production of Hamlet. He was cast as Richard in the premiere staging of Stephen Poliakoff's Sweet Panic at Hampstead Theatre in 1996. The following year he appeared in both The Paper Husband at Hampstead Theatre, and as the upper-class Pip Thompson in a revival of Arnold Wesker's Chips with Everything on the Lyttelton stage at the Royal National Theatre.

In 1998 he created the role of the Boy in Edward Albee's The Play About the Baby at the Almeida Theatre. In 1999, he joined the Royal Shakespeare Company at Stratford-upon-Avon, playing the title role in Don Carlos at The Other Place theatre, and Alcibiades in Timon of Athens at the Royal Shakespeare Theatre. Both productions transferred to the Barbican Centre in London, where his performance as Don Carlos won the 1999 Ian Charleson Award.

in 2001 he was cast as Robert Caplan in J.B. Priestley's thriller "time-play" Dangerous Corner opposite Dervla Kirwan, who played Olwen Peel at the West Yorkshire Playhouse, Leeds. The production then transferred for a four-month run at the Garrick Theatre in London's West End. From July to October 2003 at the National's Cottesloe Theatre he played the leading role of Louis XIV in Nick Dear's historical drama Power. Penry-Jones returned to the theatre at the end of 2009 playing the role of Carl in Michael Wynne's new play The Priory at the Royal Court Theatre, London, from 19 November 2009 to 16 January 2010.

On television Penry-Jones has played barrister Alex Hay in C4's ten-part serial North Square in 2000; Donald Maclean in the BBC's four-part production of Cambridge Spies in 2003; and Grimani in Russell T Davies' production of Casanova in 2005. In 2004, he joined the cast in series 3 of the BBC's BAFTA-winning series Spooks. He played the lead role of section leader Adam Carter for four series before leaving the show in 2008. He won a ITV3 Crime Thriller Award for his role in Spooks in 2008. He also went on to play the role of Captain Wentworth in ITV's adaptation of Persuasion.

In 2008 he starred with Bradley Whitford and Neve Campbell in Burn Up playing an oil executive who becomes embroiled in the politics surrounding global warming and oil stocks. He played Richard Hannay in the 2008 BBC adaptation of The 39 Steps.

In February 2009 Penry-Jones took the lead in an ITV drama, Whitechapel, a three-part thriller based on the copycat killings of Jack the Ripper. Whitechapel was the highest-performing new drama in 2009. A second series of the show based around the Kray twins was broadcast in autumn 2010; the third series began in January 2012. The fourth and last series aired in September 2013.

From 2012 to 2014 Penry-Jones was also cast opposite Maxine Peake in a legal drama Silk created by Peter Moffat. The show revolves around two barristers, played by Penry-Jones and Peake who are competing to become QCs. Series 2 aired in 2012 and Series 3 premiered on 24 February 2014. He also joined the cast of the film A Little Chaos with Kate Winslet as Antoine. The film was directed by Alan Rickman.

From 2014 to 2017 he joined the cast of Guillermo del Toro's The Strain, playing a main role as Mr.Quinlan, a vampire-human hybrid (on the side of humans), intent on killing his father... The Master. Playing Mr.Quinlan involved wearing prosthetics and a lot of make-up, for 29 episodes over 3 seasons, something Penry-Jones admitted he would not consider again in television.

In 2020 the release of the first trailer for The Batman revealed that he had an as-yet unannounced role in the film, later reported to be that of Gotham City Mayor Don Mitchell, Jr.

In 2022 Penry-Jones starred as Mike/Toby in ITV 1's drama Our House alongside Martin Compston and Tuppence Middleton.

== Personal life ==
Penry-Jones married Irish actress Dervla Kirwan in August 2007, following a four-year engagement. They had met in 2001 at a production of J. B. Priestley's Dangerous Corner. They have two children.

== Filmography ==
Key
†	Denotes projects that have not yet been released

=== Film ===
Year	Title	Role	Notes
1994	Black Beauty	Wild-Looking Young Man	
1997	Bent	Guard on Road	
1997	Food of Love	Head office staff	
1998	The Tribe	Dietrich	
1998	Hilary and Jackie	Piers Du Pré	
1998	Still Crazy	Young Ray	
1999	Virtual Sexuality	Jake	
2001	Charlotte Gray	Peter Gregory	
2002	The Four Feathers	Tom Willoughby	
2002	A Family Man	Tarquin	Short film
2005	Match Point	Henry	
2011	Manor Hunt Ball	Laurence	
2012	Red Tails	Campbell	
2014	A Little Chaos	Antoine Nompar de Caumont	
2015	In Vitro	Max	Short film
2017	Pegasus Bridge	Richard Geoffrey Pine-Coffin	
2018	Vita & Virginia	Harold Nicolson	
2020	Getting to Know You	Luke Manning	
2020	Love Sarah	Matthew	
2020	Miss Fisher and the Crypt of Tears	Jonathon Lofthouse	
2022	The Batman	Mayor Don Mitchell, Jr.	
2025	Ambleside	George Huyton	
TBA	Prisoners of Paradise †	TBA	Post-production
TBA	Hello & Paris †	TBA	Filming

=== Television ===
Year	Title	Role	Notes
1994	Fatherland	Hermann Jost	Television film
1994	French and Saunders	Stage Manager	Episode: "French and Saunders' Christmas Carol"
1995	Cold Comfort Farm	Dick Hawk-Monitor	Television film
1995	Absolutely Fabulous	Boy at Party	Series 3; episode 6: "The End"
1996	Kavanagh QC	Lt. Ralph Kinross	Series 2; episode 3: "The Burning Deck"
1996	Cold Lazarus	Policeman / Militiaman	Mini-series; episodes 3 & 4
1996	The Ring	Gerhard von Gotthard	Television film
1996	Faith in the Future	Sam	Series 2; episodes 3 & 4: "The Big Test" & "A Knight Out"
1997	The Moth	Stanley Thorman	(unknown episodes)
1997	Jane Eyre	St. John Rivers	Television film
1997	The Student Prince	The Prince	Television film
2000	North Square	Alex Hay	Episodes 1–10
2003	Cambridge Spies	Donald Maclean	Mini-series; episodes 1–4
2003	Agatha Christie's Poirot	Roddy Winter	Series 9; episode 2: "Sad Cypress"
2004–2008	Spooks	Adam Carter	Series 3–7; 41 episodes. Known as MI-5 in some countries
2005	Casanova	Grimani	Mini-series; episodes 1–3
2006	Krakatoa: The Last Days	Willem Beijerinck	Television film
2007	Persuasion	Captain Wentworth	Television film
2007	Joe's Palace	Richard Reece	Television film
2008	Burn Up	Tom	Mini-series; episodes 1 & 2
2008	The 39 Steps	Richard Hannay	Television film
2009–2013	Whitechapel	DI Joseph Chandler	Series 1–4; 18 episodes
2011–2014	Silk	Clive Reader QC	Series 1–3; 18 episodes
2012	Treasure Island	Squire Trelawney	Mini-series; episodes 1 & 2
2012	The Last Weekend	Ollie	Mini-series; episodes 1–3
2014–2017	The Strain	Mr. Quinlan	Series 2–4; 29 episodes
2015	Life in Squares	Duncan Grant (older)	Mini-series; episodes 1–3
2015	Crown for Christmas	King Maximillian	Television film
2015, 2017	Black Sails	Thomas Hamilton	Series 2; episodes 1–5, & series 4; episode 10
2018	Stan Lee's Lucky Man	Samuel Blake	Series 3; episodes 1–8
2019	The Commons	Dom Boulay	Mini-series; episodes 1–8
2020	Wizards: Tales of Arcadia	Sir Lancelot (voice)	Mini-series; episodes 1–3 & 5–7
2021	The Drowning	Mark	Main role; mini-series; episodes 1–4
2022	Our House	Toby / Mike	Episodes 2–4
2024	Those About to Die	Marsus	Episodes 1–10
2025	The Feud	John	Episodes 1–6
2026	Marble Hall Murders	Jonathon Crace / Jeffrey Chalfont	Episodes 1–6
