= Ben Richards (writer) =

English writer

- Born: 1964 (age 61–62); England, UK
- Occupations: Novelist, screenwriter and television producer.
- Writing career
- Period: 1996–present
- Genres: Drama, adventure, science fiction

Ben Richards (born 1964) is a British screenwriter and novelist. He was the lead writer on Spooks and is the writer/creator of Party Animals, Outcasts, COBRA and Showtrial. He also created The Tunnel from the Scandinavian original of “The Bridge” as well as adapting “The Cuckoo’s Calling," the first in Robert Galbraith’s Strike series for BBC1.

== Career ==
Before writing novels and TV dramas, he worked for three years as a housing officer in Newham and Islington, London. As a research student at UCL's Department of Geography he spent a year investigating public housing in Chile and on his return to Britain began his first novel "to alleviate the boredom of analysing questionnaires" for his PhD thesis. Richards was a lecturer at the University of Birmingham and at University College London, where he taught development studies, specialising in South America. He is now a full-time writer.

His novels are Throwing the House out of the Window (1996), Don't Step on the Lines (1997), The Silver River (1999), A Sweetheart Deal (2001), The Mermaid and the Drunks (2004) and Confidence (2006). He also contributed to the New Puritans anthology of 2000.

As a screenwriter, Richards has written for the BBC (Spooks and Party Animals), ITV (The Fixer) and Channel 4 (No Angels). He has also written for the British-French crime drama television series The Tunnel, an adaption of The Bridge (Danish-Swedish).

== Writing credits ==
Production	Notes	Broadcaster
Spooks	16 episodes (2003–2006, 2008–2009)	BBC One
No Angels	3 episodes (2004–2005)	Channel 4
Party Animals	6 episodes (2007)	BBC Two
The Fixer	9 episodes (2008–2009)	ITV
Outcasts	8 episodes (2011)	BBC One
The Tunnel	12 episodes (2013-2016)	Sky Atlantic; Canal+
Fortitude	"Episode #1.7" (2015)	Sky Atlantic
Strike	3 episodes (2017)	BBC One; HBO
COBRA	18 episodes (2020-2023)	Sky One; Altice Studio
Showtrial	10 episodes (2021–present)	BBC One
The Diplomat	6 episodes (2023)	Alibi
