= Lucas North =

Fictional character from Spooks

- Spooks character
- Richard Armitage as Lucas North
- First appearance: "New Allegiances"
- Last appearance: "Series 9, Episode 8"
- Portrayed by: Richard Armitage

In-universe information
- Title: Chief of Section D (before imprisonment, Series 9); Senior Case Officer, Section D (Series 7–9)
- Occupation: MI5 officer
- Spouse: Elizabeta Starkova (ex-wife)
- Nationality: English

Lucas North, formerly known as John Bateman, is a fictional character from the BBC espionage television series Spooks (known in the United States as "MI5"), which follows the exploits of Section D, a counter-terrorism division of MI5. North is portrayed by British actor Richard Armitage. The character is introduced in Spooks' seventh series as the former head of Section D, who was captured and imprisoned during an operation in Russia. He returns to the UK after eight years and is eventually reinstated into MI5. He is described as having once been the best in his field, and he is now trying to regain his former brilliance.

Lucas North is a main character in the seventh, eighth, and ninth series; the ninth series reveals that Lucas "isn't who you think he is." Following the creation of the character by the show's writers, Armitage was chosen early in the casting process, since the producers believed he could carry the mystery of the character. A tentative viewer of Spooks, he was approached for the role following the completion of the second series of Robin Hood, in which he portrayed series regular Sir Guy of Gisbourne. After agreeing to appear in Spooks, Armitage learned how to speak fluent Russian and lost a stone in weight in order to fit the description of his character.

With regard to the show's notorious habit of killing off major characters, Armitage said he had no preference as to Lucas' possible exit. He has performed his own stunts on the series, which have included a waterboarding scene, although the character becomes less physical in the ninth series. The Lucas North character and his portrayal by Armitage met with unanimous praise from cast, crew, and reviewers.

== Role in Spooks ==
=== Character arc ===
Born John Bateman, the character later known as Lucas North was raised in rural Cumbria, where his father was a Methodist minister. During his time at Leeds University he lived with Maya Lahan (Laila Rouass). While enrolled at Leeds he visited Dakar, Senegal, where he engaged in shipping cannabis to Hamburg in exchange for money.

When he was caught the authorities took the shipment and his money, stranding him in Dakar. To gain enough money to get back to the UK, he worked in a casino. While working there John Bateman was approached by Vaughn Edwards (Iain Glen), who persuaded him to deliver packages for him. One of the packages delivered by Bateman was a bomb that exploded at a British Embassy, killing 17 people.

To escape the country Bateman killed a friend of his named Lucas North. North had just made it past the first battery of tests for admission to MI5. Bateman assumed North's identity and left Maya behind. Bateman/North would later suppress these memories, believing that Vaughn was solely responsible for the bombing and for his friend's death. He would later join MI5 in place of the real Lucas North and become head of Section D. He was also once married to Elizabeta Starkova (Paloma Baeza).

During an operation in Russia, Lucas North was captured and imprisoned for eight years, during which time he was often subjected to torture.

=== Characteristics and relationships ===
Eight years in a Russian prison has had a profound effect on him. His personality is divided between who he was before he was imprisoned, the prisoner, and the person he has become. He was once the best in his field, and now he is trying to regain his former brilliance.

— —Richard Armitage

Lucas North appears to be a person divided between who he was prior to his incarceration and who he has become since. Richard Armitage has described Lucas as "very ambiguous, but quite open with everybody" and "a bit of a double-edged sword, so he's not completely white. He's a bit of a dark horse." He is also described as having "no knowledge of how damaged he is emotionally, until memories start to work their way to the surface." Following his release from prison, glimpses of him adjusting to the outside world—such as a scene in episode two in which Lucas lies on the floor rather than in a bed in order to sleep—reveal to the audience how much he is struggling, though he keeps it hidden from his teammates. Lucas also fights very hard to be accepted and to regain Harry's trust, but he does not always play by the rules. In the series seven finale, Lucas admits to having blamed Harry for his ordeal. However, in series nine, Lucas also believed he deserved being tortured, as penance for bombing the British Embassy in Dakar.

Lucas is an admirer of English poet and painter William Blake; Elizabeta reveals that Lucas' admiration of Blake is based on their common distrust of systems. Lucas decorates his flat with some of Blake's paintings, and has a chest tattoo resembling The Ancient of Days, one of Blake's watercolour paintings. Though no longer married to Elizabeta, he maintains strong feelings towards her throughout the first half of series seven.

The eighth series sees the return of Oleg Darshavin, one of Lucas's former interrogators during his imprisonment. During his interrogations, Lucas had developed Stockholm syndrome, and his interrogator had managed to deconstruct him almost to the point of being turned and wanting to die. Lucas also becomes involved with CIA liaison officer Sarah Caufield. The initial power struggle between them ends up in a "torrid love affair," which is monitored by the team. When Ruth Evershed (Nicola Walker) returns in the series, Lucas "really takes control of her position", in a similar manner to Harry and Ros's actions during Lucas's return. Armitage described Lucas's friendship with Ros as a "good combo"; while Lucas likes to play the "maverick" with "all guns blazing" Ros would "slip around the back and silently slit a throat."

Following Ros's death in the series eight finale, Lucas "sees the team's been slightly shattered by it" and responds by "trying to pull the team together and aiming to be a strong figure for Harry." The ninth series reveals a dark secret in Lucas's past. Armitage said that Lucas "isn't quite who you think he is." It sees the introduction of a character named Maya, played by Laila Rouass, who is Lucas's old flame and possible first love; she is involved in Lucas's secret. Lucas states that Maya means more to him than his job and reputation. Vaughn would use Maya as a way of controlling him. Armitage also revealed Lucas goes off the radar "quite a lot this series" and behaves "quite strangely."

== Conceptual history ==
=== Creation and casting ===
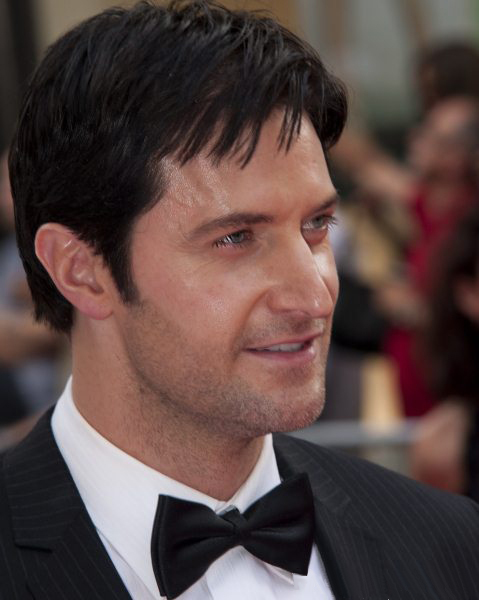
Richard Armitage was approached for the role after the completion of Robin Hood series two.

The character of Lucas North and his background was first revealed in March 2008, shortly after filming the seventh series began. The producers wanted to create a new character to be a part of the team. They came up with a "new heroic figure" that they wanted to "put as much distance between [the] previous hero," Adam Carter. The producers focused on Richard Armitage early into the casting suggestions, because they felt he could carry the mystery of Lucas North. Writer Neil Cross felt that Armitage would bring the entire tortured history of North on screen.

The producers approached Armitage in November 2007, following the completion of the second series of Robin Hood, for which he played the regular part of Sir Guy of Gisbourne. Though interested in appearing on Spooks, he was initially somewhat worried and hesitant to join the series, citing replacing Rupert Penry-Jones, which he thought was a "tall order," and fears of bringing the series down. He agreed to appear on the series upon reading the rough outline of the script. He and the producers discussed about the potential and direction for the character, as well as where he would fit in the world of Spooks. A tentative viewer of the Spooks, he spent two days catching up on the series before starting.

=== Development ===
To research for his role, Armitage read novels from authors including John le Carré, Frederick Forsyth and Robert Ludlum. He tried to inspire his acting style for Lucas by Jason Bourne, a character created by Ludlum. He also lost a stone in weight in order to keep with the description that Lucas is malnourished, but also had to keep physically fit in order to perform a fight sequence during his first week of filming. Since Lucas is a fluent Russian speaker, Armitage had to learn it phonetically, which he found "pretty impossible." He originally tried to learn it from a disc, but found it too basic and had since moved on to a language coach.

Though interested, yet frustrated about the writing style and not knowing what is going to happen next, upon starting, Armitage was told by co-star Peter Firth to learn to run with it, as well as learn the lines and political jargon quickly. He also thought the scripts are "quite a workout for the brain." Armitage was also coached on his "serious face" and the "Spooks lean" by Rupert Penry-Jones. The numerous tattoos on Lucas's torso were actually transfers planted on Armitage, and took a couple of hours to apply. However, he was often told not to move much, as they could rub off quite easily. Armitage was also one of only two actors, along with Hermione Norris, who plays Ros Myers, who went to Moscow, Russia in the series' first overseas shoot in August 2008.

When questioned regarding Spooks's notoriety of killing off main characters, and the chances of Lucas meeting his demise, Armitage stated;

To be honest I haven't thought about it too much. However, on judging the way characters tend to get killed off, I think when Lucas's time comes I'll welcome it. When Spooks characters are killed off, or disappear, it's usually the most memorable moment of the episode, or even series. There are moments in this series that take your breath away.

— Richard Armitage

Armitage believes that when it is Lucas's turn to leave the series, he would "leave in style," and has no preference how he would exit, whether "sending Lucas to Manchester or severing his head," he believes the producers would owe him a "brilliant exit." In an interview with Lorraine Kelly on GMTV in May 2010, Armitage revealed that in the ninth series, "[Lucas] is not who you thought he was. He's not who I thought he was." He admitted to being surprised at the development while reading the script. With the series theme being "deception", Armitage felt that playing another side of Lucas was "interesting," "quite exciting to play" and like "working in reverse because we've already established his background and then we've had to go and establish a much deeper background." Writers Jonathan Brackley and Sam Vincent (both head writers of the ninth series, having written five of the episodes) made the decision about Lucas' story-arc in the series during the initial meetings with the producers. Throughout the process of developing Lucas' arc, they worked through "a bazillion different versions." For example, in the series finale, they considered that Lucas would release the Albany weapon on the Grid. Both writers admitted that they were "not-half" concerned with possible negative reactions from fans of both Armitage and the character. In September 2011, co-star Peter Firth confirmed Lucas was killed off in the ninth series finale. He stated that the character "was always going to die." At some point the producers considered having Harry shoot him at the top of the building where he would fall to his death. However, this changed to have Lucas just jumping off the building instead.

=== Stunt work and on-screen violence ===
Armitage performs his own stunts. When performing fight scenes, they would be choreographed carefully so Armitage could take part rather than a stunt double. For series eight, Armitage performed a fight scene in a swimming pool, which he thought was "fun," but also thought it was difficult as it was "like acting and punching in slow motion." In another sequence, he injured a stuntman with a hospital trolley. He was only given a short lesson on how to handle firearms, since he was already accustomed to using them whilst working on Ultimate Force. While discussing the shootout at the end of series seven, Armitage noted that he is "not a violent person but when you put a gun in somebody's hands [...] it's like a little animal comes out of you that wants to fire the gun again."

In a flashback sequence in one of his early episodes, Lucas is subjected to waterboarding, a method of psychological torture. In order to ensure the authenticity of the sequence, Armitage was himself subjected to the actual torture while shooting. He agreed to perform the sequence after he was convinced by consultants for the FSB and CIA. Armitage was only subjected to it for a short time, and was filmed in slow motion to make it appear he was on for longer. The ambient temperature of the room was also raised to make him as comfortable as possible. However, after the sequence was shot, Armitage changed his opinion entirely, stating; "I only lasted five to ten seconds, and the sound of my voice crying out to stop isn't me acting." Armitage shot more interrogation scenes during production of the eighth series, but only some were added into the episodes. He was "less physical" in the ninth series.

== Reception ==
The reaction towards the character and Armitage's portrayal were met with unanimous praise. In a viewer poll on their favourite character played by Armitage on RichardArmitageNet, Lucas North was voted third behind Sir Guy of Gisbourne, and winner John Thornton in North and South. Spooks producer Katie Swinden described Armitage's addition as "fantastic", as he "has that dark and brooding quality which make him perfect for the role." Co-star Hermione Norris thought Lucas was a "really fantastic character" and has brought "a completely different vibe and quality" to the series.

John Beresford of TV Scoop thought the acting of the cast in the beginning of the seventh series, including Armitage's was "pitch perfect", and noted he "looks and sounds like he's been here all along, already, and having only seen him briefly in Robin Hood I've been quite astonished by how good he is in this." Sky TV described Lucas North's character as a "refreshing change" for the series. The Bromsgrove Advertiser noted that Armitage "certainly has the looks needed for the part" with "classic leading man presence," and while comparing past main actors of the series, Matthew Macfadyen and Rupert Penry-Jones, the author believed that "the eye candy quota is being kept high." Leigh Holmwood of The Guardian reacted positively towards the introduction of Lucas after Adam's departure, believing the change has "more than made amends." David Blackwell of Enterline Media liked Lucas "better than Adam Carter or Tom Quinn" and felt that his "dark and conflicted persona adds to the story and makes him a more interesting character than Adam or Tom ever were." Blackwell also believed that Armitage's portrayal gives the character "real intensity and mystery." In the ninth series Metro's Lewis Bazley believed that Lucas "continues to give a violent, powder-keg edge to proceedings – thank heaven for small mercies as his continual scowl never convinces in comparison with his predecessors Matthew McFadyen and Rupert Penry-Jones."

Critics reacted positively towards Lucas' development in the ninth series. Metro's Keith Watson said that the scene had a "touch of Don Draper about it," one of the factors that "Spooks has still got its hooks in." Catherine Gee of The Daily Telegraph reflected on the "dramatically provided" twist, stated "just as we were finally beginning to trust him." Vicky Frost of The Guardian stated that Spooks was "looking a bit lacklustre," but now "seems to have raised its game" because of several developments for series nine, including the closing scenes involving Lucas and Vaughn, and his relationship with Dimitri Levendis.
