= Spooks (TV series) =

British television drama series (2002–2011)

- Spooks title sequence
- Also known as: MI-5
- Genre: Spy drama; Action-adventure; Mystery
- Created by: David Wolstencroft
- Starring: Peter Firth; Matthew Macfadyen; Keeley Hawes; David Oyelowo; Hugh Simon; Rory MacGregor; Nicola Walker; Rupert Penry Jones; Olga Sosnovska; Raza Jaffrey; Miranda Raison; Hermione Norris; Gemma Jones; Richard Armitage; Shazad Latif; Sophia Myles; Max Brown; Lara Pulver; Geoffrey Streatfeild; William Hope; Simon Russell Beale; Tim McInnerny; Jenny Agutter
- Theme music composer: Jennie Muskett
- Composers: Jennie Muskett (Series 1–4); Paul Leonard-Morgan (Series 5–10)
- Country of origin: United Kingdom
- Original language: English
- No. of series: 10
- No. of episodes: 86 (list of episodes)

Production
- Running time: 60 minutes

Original release
- Network: BBC One; BBC Three
- Release: 13 May 2002 – 23 October 2011

Related
- Spooks: Code 9; Spooks: The Greater Good

Spooks (known as MI-5 in some countries) is a British television spy drama series that originally aired on BBC One from 13 May 2002 to 23 October 2011, consisting of 10 seasons. The title is a colloquialism for spies, and the series follows the activities of the intelligence officers of Section D in MI5, based at the service's Thames House headquarters, in a highly secure suite of offices known as The Grid. In the United States, the show is broadcast under the title MI-5. In Canada, the programme originally aired as MI-5, but later aired on BBC Canada as Spooks.

The series continued with a film, Spooks: The Greater Good, which was released on 8 May 2015.

== Series synopses ==
Series	Episodes	Originally released		Average viewership (in millions)
Series	Episodes	First released	Last released	Average viewership (in millions)
1	6	13 May 2002	17 June 2002	7.49 (Note: Based from the consolidated ratings from the first series for BBC One.)
2	10	2 June 2003	11 August 2003	7.19 (Note: Based from the consolidated ratings from the second series for BBC One, with the exception of the sixth episode which are not available.)
3	10	11 October 2004	13 December 2004	5.77 (Note: Based from the consolidated ratings from the third series for BBC One.)
4	10	12 September 2005	10 November 2005	6.05 (Note: Based from the consolidated ratings from the fourth series for BBC One.)
5	10	17 September 2006	13 November 2006	5.97 (Note: Based from the consolidated ratings from the fifth series for BBC One.)
6	10	16 October 2007	18 December 2007	5.57 (Note: Based from the consolidated ratings from the sixth series for BBC One.)
7	8	27 October 2008	8 December 2008	5.46 (Note: Based from the consolidated ratings from the seventh series for BBC One.)
8	8	4 November 2009	23 December 2009	5.34 (Note: Based from the consolidated ratings from the eighth series for BBC One, with the exception of the seventh episode which are not available.)
9	8	20 September 2010	8 November 2010	6.33 (Note: Based from the consolidated ratings from the ninth series for BBC One.)
10	6	18 September 2011	23 October 2011	5.41 (Note: Based from the consolidated ratings from the final series for BBC One.)

The show consists of 86 episodes, beginning in May 2002 and ending in October 2011. Most episodes end with the final scene freezing and changing to a black-and-white negative image that then compresses with a distinctive sound effect into a flat white line against a black screen.

=== Series 1 ===
Starring Matthew Macfadyen, Keeley Hawes, David Oyelowo, Jenny Agutter, and Peter Firth, the initial series of six one-hour episodes premiered 13 May 2002.

Due to its combination of stylistic photography with fast-paced storylines, the series was a critical and popular success, averaging 7.5 million viewers over its six episodes.

The second episode gained notoriety for the violent killing of character Helen Flynn (Lisa Faulkner), which drew the largest number of complaints to the Broadcasting Standards Commission in 2002. During an undercover operation Helen and Tom were captured by race riot instigator Robert Osborne, played by Kevin McNally, who tortured Helen with a deep fryer in an attempt to make Tom reveal classified information. He refused and she was killed. This provoked an angry reaction from many viewers who jammed BBC phone switchboards with complaints, despite the show airing after the 9 pm watershed.

=== Series 2 ===
With the success of the first series, a second, longer series of ten episodes was commissioned and aired in 2003. New regular characters Sam Buxton (Shauna Macdonald) and Ruth Evershed (Nicola Walker), were introduced in the first and second episodes respectively, while the series finale ended with a dramatic cliffhanger. The series averaged 7.1 million viewers.

=== Series 3 ===
A third series of ten episodes was transmitted on BBC One in the autumn of 2004 and concluded on 13 December. The first episode features Rupert Penry-Jones as Adam Carter, who was drafted in from MI6 to help investigate Tom's disappearance. He later takes over Tom's position as Section Chief after the latter jeopardised an important operation.

In episode six, Zoe is taken to court for misconduct during an operation and is forced to leave MI5 and assume a new identity in Chile. She is replaced by Adam's wife, Fiona (Olga Sosnovska). In the series finale, Danny is killed while he and Fiona are being held hostage. Audience figures dropped to a series average of 5.8 million viewers.

=== Series 4 ===
The fourth series of Spooks began airing on Monday 12 September 2005 on BBC One at 9 pm with the first instalment of a two-part story. The next day the second episode was shown. The following week Spooks began airing in the Thursday 9 pm slot, a change from the Monday 9 pm slot that the previous three series had occupied. Once again, the series ran for ten episodes. It averaged 6.05 million viewers per episode, notably more than the previous series.

The opening two-part episode introduces two new characters to the series, Zafar Younis (Raza Jaffrey, whose character had first appeared in the final episode of series three), and Juliet Shaw (Anna Chancellor). The storyline involves a terrorist bombing in central London, something that, in reality, took place on 7 July, two months before the episode was due to air, but after it had already been filmed.

According to The Guardian newspaper, the day the first episode aired, "The similarities were sufficient to cause head of drama, Jane Tranter and new BBC One controller Peter Fincham to agonise over whether to drop the episodes." The episodes were eventually aired unedited, although before both instalments of the two-parter the BBC One continuity announcer warned viewers that they featured scenes of terrorist bombing in London which some viewers might find disturbing.

In episode seven, the character Fiona Carter gets killed off because the actress portraying her, Olga Sosnovska, was pregnant during filming and chose to leave the programme. In that story arc, Fiona attempts to kill her deranged ex-husband, who she thought had been hanged several years earlier. However, her ex-husband ultimately abducts her and later shoots her dead in Adam's presence during her attempted escape. Fiona is replaced at MI5 by Jo Portman (played by Miranda Raison), a character who had been recruited by Adam Carter in a previous episode.

=== Series 5 ===
The fifth (ten-part) series of Spooks aired its first episode in two parts, the first appearing on 17 September 2006. In it, elements within the British Government, MI6 and the British media conspire in an attempt to overthrow Parliament and the Prime Minister. These elements agree that for Britain to survive the threats posed by modern-day terrorism, democracy had to be replaced with rule by committee. The second part followed the next day, marking Spooks's return to BBC One's Monday night schedule. These episodes introduced Ros Myers (Hermione Norris).

This series's storylines include a fake home-grown Al-Qaeda cell that plans an attack on London; the British government selling nuclear technology to Saudi Arabia; and the US administration selling arms to African dictators.

The ratings for this series remained consistent with those of the previous series, averaging six million viewers.

=== Series 6 ===
The sixth series was commissioned by Jane Tranter, Head of Drama Commissioning at the BBC, by the time series 5 was announced. The series returned on 16 October 2007 at 9 pm on BBC One, and concluded on 18 December. The series averaged 5.68 million viewers (the lowest to date) The sixth series was different in certain respects from the previous five because it had a dominant storyline running through the entire season and the show contained end credits for the first time. There was also a less frequent use of the soundtrack composed by Jennie Muskett.

The primary storyline of Series 6 follows Iran seeking the ability to manufacture its own nuclear weapons and searching for sellers of nuclear armaments components. The governments of several nations (principally the United States and its CIA, Russia's FSB, and a shadowy third organisation composed of disenfranchised members of other agencies, including MI5) are woven throughout the plot. Simon Abkarian plays the Iranian Special Consul liaising with the various governments. Agni Scott as his wife, Matthew Marsh as the CIA station chief, and Robert Glenister as the British Home Secretary, all have recurring roles throughout the series.

A new website called "Spooks Interactive" was created to coincide with the launch of the series. In April 2008, the Spooks production team won the BAFTA Award for Interactivity for their work on Spooks Interactive.

=== Series 7 ===
Series seven of Spooks began airing on 27 October 2008 for an eight-episode run. Peter Firth returns as Harry Pearce, along with Alex Lanipekun as Ben Kaplan, Hugh Simon as Malcolm Wynn-Jones, Miranda Raison as Jo Portman and Gemma Jones as Connie James.

In the first episode, central character Adam Carter (portrayed by Rupert Penry-Jones) dies in a car explosion set by terrorists, and the character Ros Myers (played by Hermione Norris) returns to the show as a deep-cover agent in Moscow. Richard Armitage joins the cast as Lucas North, an agent who has been held in a Russian prison for the past eight years and released as part of a spy exchange. Following Adam's death, Ros is made the section leader and Lucas assumes Ros's previous position as senior case officer.

The series eight recommission press release announced that there would be a twist in the final episode of series 7. In that episode, a nuclear bomb is set to explode, triggered by a Russian sleeper agent who is part of Operation Tiresias. As Parliament and the Royal Family are evacuated, the nuclear threat to London is eliminated when Ros and Lucas are able to turn Connie James and elude an FSB kill squad. While defusing the bomb, Connie is killed by its conventional explosives. Seconds before the bomb explodes, Connie reveals it had not been Harry who sold Lucas North out to the Russians as Lucas had always believed but, rather, herself. The episode concludes with Harry, conscious but with his mouth taped shut, in the boot of a car being zipped up in a body bag by Viktor Sarkisian, head of the FSB's London station.

=== Series 8 ===
In December 2008, the BBC announced that series 8 would start filming in March 2009 and air in late 2009, and that both Hermione Norris (Ros) and Richard Armitage (Lucas) would be returning. Series 8 started on Wednesday 4 November 2009, at 9 pm on BBC One, with episode 2 broadcast on Friday 6 November at 9 pm on BBC Three. The opening episode of series 8 drew 6 million viewers, a 25% share of audience numbers between 9 pm and 10 pm.

The first episode of the series picks up the story from where it left off in a cliffhanger at the end of series 7, with Harry Pearce being held captive by the Russians. During this episode, Ruth Evershed is reintroduced, having spent her time since series 5 in Cyprus. The only character other than Harry who has been in the programme since its inception, Malcolm Wynn-Jones, departs, stating simply that he is "too old". His replacement comes in the form of much a younger technician, Tariq Masood (Shazad Latif).

The series again revolves around one major plot arc, focused on a mysterious organisation known only as "Nightingale". Over the course of the series, Lucas North's loyalty is continually called into question, for the most part because of his ongoing relationship with CIA agent Sarah Caulfield, who is connected to Nightingale.

Jo Portman also briefly returns, but is killed by Ros in a dramatic act of martyrdom after being captured by a terrorist. Ros is haunted by the memory of this event for the remainder of this series.

At the end of the series, Section D does not appear to have made much progress in tackling Nightingale, and Ros Myers is killed in an explosion, along with the new Home Secretary, Andrew Lawrence.

=== Series 9 ===
Spooks returned for a ninth series on Monday 20 September 2010 for an eight-episode run.

New cast members in this series include Sophia Myles and Max Brown as MI5 officers and Simon Russell Beale as the Home Secretary. Iain Glen and Laila Rouass also joined the series, playing Vaughn Edwards and Maya Lahan – figures from Lucas's mysterious past.

The series ends with the death of Lucas's lover Maya Lahan, following the death of Lucas's blackmailer, Vaughn, at the climactic end of the penultimate episode. Lucas had kidnapped Ruth, binding and gagging her, and was attempting to get a top-secret computer file for the Chinese. The climactic scene is a showdown between Harry and Lucas on top of a tower block in London. After Harry reveals that the file never actually worked, and that Lucas had apparently betrayed his MI5 colleagues and stolen another man's identity, "Lucas" (whose "real" name is apparently John Bateman) orders Harry to turn around. Harry anticipates execution, but no shots come. Hearing a car alarm and screams from the ground many seconds later, Harry turns around to find Lucas no longer on the roof. Forty-eight hours later, the Home Secretary calls Harry to inform him that a full investigation will be made into his actions at MI5 and to "prepare for life after MI5". The series ends with Harry looking out over the London skyline at night. A caption reveals that a 10th series is planned for 2011.

=== Series 10 ===
Production on the six-episode series reportedly began during March 2011, with Lara Pulver joining the series as an "ambitious, hungry" new spook "determined to make her mark". Also joining the series were Geoffrey Streatfeild, Alice Krige and Jonathan Hyde, while Peter Firth, Nicola Walker, Max Brown, Shazad Latif and Simon Russell Beale reprised their roles, as did Matthew Macfadyen in a cameo appearance in the final episode. Sophia Myles did not return as Beth Bailey.

This series concludes with the revelation of a plot to force Britain and Russia into war. Harry manages to thwart the plot and decides to leave the service to live a normal life with Ruth Evershed. But when a vengeful Sasha Gavrik attempts to take revenge on him, Ruth takes the blow for Harry and dies in his arms. Harry then decides to return to MI5, since the prospect of a normal life, whatever that would mean without Ruth, no longer appeals to him.

Kudos and the BBC announced in a joint statement in August 2011 that Series 10 would be the last series. It began airing on BBC One on Sunday 18 September 2011 at 9:00 pm, moving from its former weekday evening slot, with the final episode airing on 23 October 2011.

=== Spooks: The Greater Good ===
A feature-length film, Spooks: The Greater Good, known in the US as MI-5, was released in May 2015. Peter Firth reprises his role as Harry Pearce. Also returning from the TV series are Tim McInnerny as Oliver Mace, Lara Pulver as Erin Watts, Hugh Simon as Malcolm Wynn-Jones, and Geoffrey Streatfeild as Calum Reed. Kit Harington and Jennifer Ehle star as new characters in leading roles.

== Characters ==
=== Main ===
==== The Grid (surviving) ====
- Sir Harry Pearce KBE (Peter Firth; 2002–2011) Head of Counter-Terrorism Department ("Section D") MI5.
- Tom Quinn (Matthew Macfadyen; 2002–2004; 2011) Chief of Section and Senior Case Officer, Section D. Decommissioned after jeopardising a key mission and took early retirement. Became a private contractor after leaving MI5. In the final episode of the series, Quinn is hired by Harry as an 'outside source' to kill a double agent for both MI5 and the FSB.
- Tessa Phillips (Jenny Agutter; 2002–2003) Senior Case Officer, Section K. Left the Grid after being discovered by Harry running "ghost" agents. Fled the country after sabotaging an operation.
- Dimitri Levendis (Max Brown; 2010–2011) Piracy and Terrorism Case Officer, Section D. Also ex–Special Boat Service.
- Zoe Reynolds (Keeley Hawes; 2002–2004) Junior Case Officer, Section D. Hidden "off-the-books" in Chile after she was caught making a mistake on an undercover mission in Series 3, Episode 6.
- Beth Bailey (Sophia Myles; 2010) Junior Case Officer, Section D. Decommissioned by Erin Watts in the time between series 9 and 10.
- Sam Buxton (Shauna Macdonald; 2003–2004) Administrative Officer, Section D. Reassigned to GCHQ following Danny's demise.
- Malcolm Wynn-Jones (Hugh Simon; 2002–2009; 2010) Technician and Data Analyst, Section D. Retired.

==== The Grid (status unknown) ====
- Jed Kelley (Graeme Mearns; 2002) Administrative Officer, Section D. Status unknown.

==== The Grid (deceased) ====
Arranged in approximate order of seniority and, among equals, most recent last.

- Adam Carter (Rupert Penry-Jones; 2004–2008) Chief of Section and Senior Case Officer, Section D. Killed by a car bomb in Series 7, Episode 1.
- Ros Myers (Hermione Norris; 2006–2009) Chief of Section and Senior Case Officer, Section D. Killed in an explosion while attempting to rescue the Home Secretary in Series 8, Episode 8.
- Lucas North/John Bateman (Richard Armitage; 2008–2010) Chief of Section and Senior Case Officer, Section D. Jumped from a rooftop to his death after a showdown with Harry Pearce in Series 9, Episode 8.
- Erin Watts (Lara Pulver; 2011) Section Chief, Section D; former acting Head of Counter-Terrorism Department, MI5. Killed herself after being captured by a terrorist cell in Spooks: The Greater Good.
- Fiona Carter (Olga Sosnovska; 2004–2005) MI6 Officer, Section D. Shot by Syrian ex-husband during an operation in Series 4, Episode 7.
- Danny Hunter (David Oyelowo; 2002–2004) Junior Case Officer, Section D. Executed during a terrorist hostage situation in Series 3, Episode 10.
- Zafar Younis (Raza Jaffrey; 2004–2007) Junior Case Officer, Section D. Tortured and killed by a rogue cell called The Redbacks sometime after being abducted in Series 6, Episode 1.
- Ben Kaplan DSO (Alex Lanipekun; 2007–2008) Junior Case Officer, Section D. Throat cut by FSB mole Connie James in Series 7, Episode 7.
- Jo Portman (Miranda Raison; 2005–2009) Junior Case Officer Section D. Shot by Ros Myers while restraining a terrorist during a hostage situation in Series 8, Episode 3.
- Calum Reed (Geoffrey Streatfeild; 2011) Junior Case Officer, Section D. Killed by the terrorist Qasim during the takeover of the Grid in Spooks: The Greater Good.
- Ruth Evershed (Nicola Walker; 2003–2006 and 2009–2011) Former Senior Intelligence Analyst, Section D, later Security Advisor to Home Secretary William Towers. Stabbed by Sasha Gavrik, Series 10, Episode 6.
- Connie James (Gemma Jones; 2007–2008) Former Senior Analyst Section D. Arrested as an FSB mole. Killed while defusing a nuclear bomb in Series 7, Episode 8.
- Helen Flynn (Lisa Faulkner; 2002) Administrative Officer, Section D. Tortured and shot by a right-wing terrorist in Series 1, Episode 2.
- Colin Wells (Rory MacGregor; 2002–2006) Technician and Data Analyst, Section D. Hanged by corrupt MI6 officers during their attempted coup d'état in Series 5, Episode 1.
- Tariq Masood (Shazad Latif; 2009–2011) Technician and Data Analyst, Section D Assassinated with a hydrogen cyanide-related compound after discovering vital intel at his bugged home in Series 10, Episode 2.

==== Other (surviving) ====
- The Rt Hon William Towers MP (Simon Russell Beale; 2010–2011) British Home Secretary, serving as part of a coalition government.
- Ilya Gavrik (Jonathan Hyde; 2011) Russian Minister for International Development former KGB Operative and old adversary of Harry during the cold war.
- Oliver Mace (Tim McInnerny; 2004–2006) Chairman of the Joint Intelligence Committee. Forced to resign after being exposed as the mastermind behind illegal torture of terror suspects.
- Sir Richard Dolby (Robert East; 2008) Director General of MI5.
- Bob Hogan (Matthew Marsh; 2007) Former CIA London station chief. Dismissed from CIA for working with mercenaries against MI5.
- Dariush Bakhshi (Simon Abkarian; 2007) Iranian Special Consul.
- Jools Siviter (Hugh Laurie; 2002) MI6 Section Chief. Reassigned out of the country.
- Christine Dale (Megan Dodds; 2002–2004) CIA agent and MI5 liaison officer. Resigned following her involvement in Tom's investigation and apprehension.
- Sasha Gavrik (Tom Weston-Jones, 2011) FSB officer and son of Elena Gavrik and Ilya Gavrik.
- Elisavieta Starkova (Paloma Baeza; 2009) Lucas North's ex-wife and a double agent. Dropped as an asset on Lucas's request.
- Wes Carter (James Dicker; 2004–2008) Son of Adam and Fiona. Sent to live with his grandmother after being orphaned following his father's death.

==== Other (status unknown) ====
- Juliet Shaw (Anna Chancellor; 2005–2007) Former National Security Coordinator, exposed as Head of Yalta.
- Alton Beecher (Colin Salmon; 2010) The head CIA liaison officer stationed in London.
- Bernard Qualtrough (Richard Johnson; 2008) Harry's former mentor and retired SIS officer. Exposed as an FSB mole after the Sugarhorse incident.

==== Other (deceased) ====
- The Rt Hon Nicholas Blake MP (Robert Glenister; 2006–2010) – Former British Home Secretary. Forced to resign after allegations of corruption. Later exposed by Ruth as a senior member of Nightingale who ordered the hotel bombing that killed Home Secretary Andrew Lawrence and Ros Myers. Poisoned by Harry, who had learned from Ruth that Blake was a traitor.
- The Rt Hon Andrew Lawrence MP (Tobias Menzies; 2009) – Former British Home Secretary. Killed in an explosion alongside Ros Myers, though his body was never seen.
- Sam Walker (Brian Protheroe; 2009) – CIA's London station chief. Murdered by Nightingale operative Sarah Caulfield for investigating Nightingale.
- Viktor Sarkisian (Peter Sullivan; (2008–2009) – Former head of the FSB's London station. Murdered early in series 8 episode 1 by the man to whom he had intended to sell a kidnapped Harry Pearce. Viktor's killer was himself killed at the end of the 1st episode by Lucas when he and Ros rescued Harry and Ruth, who had returned from Cyprus.
- James 'Jim' Coaver (William Hope, 2011) CIA Deputy Director and an old friend of Harry Pearce; helped turn Elena Gavrik in the 1980s. Suspected of being behind the attacks on MI5 and Gavrik as well as the death of Tariq Masood, but apparently set-up for Harry to believe this. Beaten and fatally injured by mercenaries posing as CIA agents, died minutes later.
- Sarah Caulfield (Genevieve O'Reilly; 2009) – CIA agent and MI5 liaison officer. Lucas North's lover. Assassinated by a hitman for Nightingale after being captured by MI5 and exposed as a traitor.
- Vaughn Edwards (Iain Glen; 2010) – Lucas North/John Bateman's blackmailer and his apparent employer in relation to the Dakar Bombings. Died from blood loss received from a knife wound after a confrontation with Lucas/John.
- Elena Gavrik (Alice Krige, 2011) Wife of Ilya Gavrik and former asset and lover of Harry Pearce during the cold war. Killed by Ilya Gavrik after being revealed to be a Russian ultra-nationalist double-agent.
- Maya Lahan (Laila Rouass; 2010) – Lucas North/John Bateman's ex-girlfriend. Died from gunshot wounds during a shoot out with Alec, Beth and Dimitri while attempting to flee the country with Lucas/John.

== Production ==
The programme was created by writer David Wolstencroft, and produced by Kudos for the BBC. A trademark style, coupled with the series' popularity, attracted a large number of high-profile guest stars. These included Martine McCutcheon, Hugh Laurie, Haluk Bilginer, Robert Hardy, Tim McInnerny, Bruce Payne, Reece Dinsdale, Ian McDiarmid, Ewen Bremner, Jimi Mistry, Andy Serkis, Benedict Cumberbatch, Kevin McNally, Rupert Graves, Andrew Tiernan, Anton Lesser, Anupam Kher, Alexander Siddig, and Anthony Head.

=== Locations ===
The availability and iconic status of certain London landmarks made them popular locations throughout production. Exterior shots of Thames House, the headquarters of MI5 were used in many episodes to establish the location. However, due to the security risks involved with filming such a location, London's Freemasons' Hall was used for scenes where actors were entering or leaving the building, and for some internal locations. This same location was later used as Thames House in Torchwood: Children of Earth. Establishing shots of the SIS Building were also used for scenes involving members of the Secret Intelligence Service or MI6. Other landmarks commonly used included the London Underground, and the Millennium Bridge. Many scenes are filmed in and around the Docklands, especially Canary Wharf, Rotherhithe, London Bridge and Greenwich (including The Old Royal Naval College), as well as the More London development. Some of the army barracks were filmed at Merchant Taylors' School, Northwood.

== Broadcast and release ==
The series was filmed on Super 16, rather than the more commonly used digital alternatives. Episodes were originally aired with no credits on BBC One, a choice made to maintain an atmosphere of the anonymity of real-life spies and the drama of each episode. Prior to series nine, each subsequent episode was aired on BBC Three one week ahead of its BBC One showing (the first and last episode were shown only on BBC One). BBC Three airings included a brief credit sequence following the trailer and before the Kudos and BBC logos. The entire 86 episodes were made available free-to-view on the BBC iPlayer in April 2020.

=== International broadcast ===
The series is a popular export, syndicated to more than 26 countries. However, it has struggled for popularity in some, notably the United States: two of the three channels to have broadcast Spooks in the US pulled the show during the fourth series due to low viewing figures. Because of the potentially racist connotations of the term Spooks in some countries, international broadcasts are often renamed.

=== Home media ===
Series	Region 1	Region 2	Region 4	Extras
Series One	13 January 2004	16 June 2003	18 August 2003 2006 (Slimline)	Deleted scenes, a guide to Spooks terminology, character biographies, image galleries, interviews and commentaries with the cast and crew, PDF scripts.
Series Two	11 January 2005	20 September 2004	21 March 2004 21 March 2005 (Collector's Edition) 2006 (Slimline)	Outtakes, cast interviews and commentaries, featurettes, including PDF scripts.
Series Three	31 January 2006	5 September 2005	23 May 2005	Audio commentaries, "behind the scenes" featurettes, deleted scenes and DVD ROM content, including PDF scripts, wallpapers and image gallery.
Series Four	9 January 2007	4 September 2006	19 May 2007	Audio commentaries, a "behind the scenes" documentary and interviews with the series producer and the director of episodes 9 and 10.
Series Five	8 January 2008	10 September 2007	19 May 2008	Two audio commentaries, cast interviews and Miranda Raison's video diary for series 6.
Series Six	20 January 2009	6 October 2008	2 August 2008	Two audio commentaries from the location managers, two audio commentaries with the producer and writer, a "behind the scenes" documentary on episode 6.8, series 6 trailers, four cast interviews and Miranda's video diary.
Series Seven	26 January 2010	12 October 2009	18 March 2009	Two audio commentaries, a "behind the scenes" in Russia with Richard Armitage and Hermione Norris, cast interviews.
Series Eight	25 January 2011	20 September 2010	3 November 2010	Two audio commentaries with the producer and director, two brief featurettes of the Colleville explosion and Walker's murder. This DVD set does not include a Dolby Digital 5.1 which all other sets have. Only a 2.0 soundtrack was included.
Series Nine	12 July 2011	28 February 2011	1 June 2011	Two audio commentaries, and two mini-featurettes, "The Cost of Being a Spy" and "The Downfall of Lucas North".
Series Ten	6 March 2012	28 November 2011	4 April 2012	Harry's Game – Feature, Top Ten Spooks Moments
The Complete Collection	N/A	N/A	31 October 2012	Same as individual seasons.

All series of Spooks (most episodes cut down to 50 minutes) are available on iTunes, with series 7, 8, 9 and 10 becoming available to download one week after original broadcast. Series 1–8 have been released on DVD by Contender Home Entertainment with its successor Entertainment One then taking over; series 9 was released by Universal Playback.

== Awards and nominations ==
Year	Award	Category	Nominee(s)	Result
2002	Royal Television Society Craft & Design Awards	Sound - Drama	Julian Slater, Nigel Heath, Michael Fentum, Dan Morgan	Nominated
2003	British Academy Television Awards	Best Drama Series		Won
2003	British Academy Television Awards	Original Television Music	Jennie Muskett	Nominated
2003	British Academy Television Awards	Editing in Entertainment	Colin Green	Nominated
2003	Broadcast Awards	Best Drama Series		Won
2003	Royal Television Society Awards	Best Drama Series		Nominated
2003	Royal Television Society Awards	Best Writing	David Wolstencroft and Howard Brenton	Nominated
2003	BBC Drama Awards	Best Drama		Won
2003	BBC Drama Awards	Best Drama Website		Won
2004	Royal Television Society Awards	Best Drama Series		Won
2005	British Academy Television Awards	Best Drama Series		Nominated
2006	British Academy Television Awards	Best Drama Series		Nominated
2007	Royal Television Society Craft & Design Awards	Photography - Drama	Damian Bromley	Nominated
2007	Royal Television Society Craft & Design Awards	Sound - Drama	Rudi Buckle, James Feltham, Darren Banks	Nominated
2008	British Academy Television Awards	Interactivity		Won
2008	Crime Thriller Awards	Best Actor	Rupert Penry Jones	Won
2008	Crime Thriller Awards	Best Actress	Hermione Norris	Won
2008	Crime Thriller Awards	Crime Drama		Nominated
2008	Royal Television Society Craft & Design Awards	Lighting, Photography & Camera - Photography - Drama	Damian Bromley	Won
2008	Royal Television Society Craft & Design Awards	Tape & Film Editing - Drama	Jamie Pearson	Nominated
2009	British Academy Television Awards	Best Drama Series		Nominated
2009	British Academy Television Awards	Original Television Music	Paul Leonard-Morgan	Nominated
2009	Crime Thriller Awards	The TV Dagger		Nominated
2009	Crime Thriller Awards	Best Actress	Hermione Norris	Nominated
2010	British Academy Television Awards	Best Drama Series		Nominated
2011	Royal Television Society Craft & Design Awards	Judges' Award		Won
2012	British Academy Television Awards	Best Drama Series		Nominated

== Music ==
The music for series one to four and theme tune was composed by Jennie Muskett. Music for series five to ten was composed by Paul Leonard-Morgan. Four soundtracks have been released for the show, the first includes music from series one and two, the second (currently and perhaps only ever available on iTunes) featuring music from series five and six (Two additional tracks are available on the composer's website). The third and fourth soundtracks (containing tracks from series seven & eight, and nine & ten respectively) were released on iTunes in November 2011. The track listings contain spoilers to the episode content.

Broadcast editions of the episodes have been known to feature alternate music to that found on the commercially available DVD releases. In the final episode of Series two, music from the film score Spy Game was used—composed by Harry Gregson-Williams. The tracks used are "Beirut, a War Zone" and "Operation Dinner Out". Both are available on the official soundtrack release for the film.

== Wider universe ==
=== Spooks: Code 9 ===
Following the success of Torchwood (the BBC Three Doctor Who spin-off series) the controller of BBC Three, Julian Bellamy, announced in December 2006 a Spooks spin-off entitled Spooks: Code 9 (working titles: Rogue Spooks and Spooks: Liberty). The show started filming in Bradford in 2008 and the first and second episodes were broadcast on 10 August 2008. It was not well received by critics, who said "the script is poor and the acting little better" (The Sunday Times) and the production "utterly uninspired and stale" (Digital Spy), "daft and unconvincing" (The Telegraph), "an utterly cynical venture" that "given its patronising awfulness ... actually damages the Spooks brand" (The Guardian).

=== Books ===
- Sangster, Jim: Spooks Confidential: The Official Handbook (2003), Contender Books (London) ISBN 1-84357-069-6
  - Episode guide to the first two series, and background information on MI5 and the making of the series
- Spooks: The Personnel Files (2007), Headline Publishing Group (London) ISBN 978-0-7553-3397-4
  - Detailed MI5 personnel files of eight of the show's main characters: Adam Carter, Danny Hunter, Zoe Reynolds, Tom Quinn, Ruth Evershed, Harry Pearce, Zafar Younis and Malcolm Wynn-Jones, presented through a compilation of transcripts, reports and forms.
- Spooks: Behind the Scenes (2006), Orion Books (London) ISBN 0-7528-7610-4
  - Background information on British intelligence and episode guides for the first four series
- Spooks: Harry's Diary: Top Secret (2007), Headline Publishing Group (London) ISBN 978-0-7553-3398-1
  - The untold stories of Spooks, and MI5, as seen from the perspective of Harry Pearce, the Spooks team leader
- Adam Carter: Revealed (2008), Headline Publishing Group (London) ISBN 978-0-7553-3401-8
  - Revealing the truth about Adam Carter after his death, explaining the true details of his childhood, the extraordinary responsibilities he took on as a teenager, and how he nearly betrayed his country but never betrayed the people he loved.

=== Video games ===
Video games based on the show were created by Preloaded for promotional purposes. In 2005, the video game The Grid (a promotion for Spooks series 3) was nominated for a Webby Award under the category of Best Game.

On 19 February 2004, BBC Worldwide announced that a video game based on the show would be released for the PlayStation 2, Xbox and Microsoft Windows for a fall 2004 release, developed by their in-house video game development studio Gamezlab. and would have run on a new game engine. It was not released, after BBC Worldwide closed Gamezlab and exited the video game publishing market.

== See also ==
- The Sandbaggers
