= Spooks series 3 =

Third series of the British spy drama television series Spooks

Spooks
- Season 3
- DVD cover art of Spooks series three
- No. of episodes: 10

Release
- Original network: BBC One; BBC Three
- Original release: 11 October – 13 December 2004

Season chronology
- ← Previous; Series 2 Next → Series 4

The third series of the British spy drama television series Spooks (known as MI-5 in the United States) began broadcasting on 11 October 2004 on BBC One, and ended on 13 December 2004. It consists of ten episodes which continue to follow the actions of Section D, a counter-terrorism division of the British Security Service (MI5). It also sees the departure of three principal characters: Tom Quinn (Matthew Macfadyen) is decommissioned in the second episode, Zoe Reynolds (Keeley Hawes) is exiled to Chile in the sixth episode, and Danny Hunter (David Oyelowo) is killed in the series finale. In addition to Macfadyen, Hawes and Oyelowo, Peter Firth, Rupert Penry-Jones, Nicola Walker, Hugh Simon, Shauna Macdonald and Rory MacGregor are listed as the main cast.

The producers knew that Macfayden was leaving, and were "99% sure" that he would not appear at all in Series 3. The first two episodes were therefore initially written without him, but the producers later heard he wanted to appear in them and he was written back in. Because of his departure, the producers created a new character, Adam Carter. The producers took information from advisors who were ex-MI5 officers during their detailed research, and many of the story lines are based on fact. The series was directed in five blocks of two episodes in each. Filming started in January 2004 and took place over six to seven months. Shooting took place almost entirely in London, England, with some scenes shot on a North Sea ferry in the fifth episode.

The third series was seen by an average of 5.77 million viewers, a decline in ratings from the second series with viewership dropping below five million at one point. However, the BBC had renewed Spooks for a fourth series before the third had begun broadcasting. Critical reaction was generally positive, though reviewers believed it did not perform as well as its preceding seasons. It was nominated for seven British Academy Television Awards (BAFTA), winning one. The third series was released on DVD on 23 May 2005 in Region 4, 5 September 2005 in Region 2, and 31 January 2006 in Region 1.

== Episodes ==
No. overall	No. in series	Title	Directed by	Written by	Original release date	UK viewers (millions)
17	1	"Project Friendly Fire"	Jonny Campbell	Howard Brenton	11 October 2004 (BBC One)	6.77
Taking place just after "Smoke and Mirrors", Tom Quinn is framed for assassinating the Chief of the Defence Staff, who was actually murdered by (believed-to-be-dead) CIA agent Herman Joyce as revenge for ruining his daughter's life. Chairman of the Joint Intelligence Committee Oliver Mace conducts an investigation into Section D, intending to fire them all as traitors in support of a senior UK political conspiracy to take direct control of MI5 and MI6. Harry Pearce recovers from Tom's shooting of him and brings in MI6 officer Adam Carter to prove Tom's innocence. Tom tracks Joyce to his daughter's church and kills him, before delivering the body to Thames House. Though it proves Joyce faked his death, it does not prove Tom's innocence. Later, Section D learns that Joyce's wife, Carmen (Frances Tomelty), plans to meet Joyce in London. The team follows her to a flat, where Adam pays her a visit. Through recording devices, Adam has Carmen confess to framing Tom, before allowing her to kill herself, which prevents Mace from making her change her story. Tom is cleared and reinstated, Harry keeps his job despite being completely duped by Joyce and refusing to believe Tom, and Tom's CIA girlfriend Christine Dale resigns. She warns Tom to leave his work before it will "destroy" him.
18	2	"The Sleeper"	Jonny Campbell	Howard Brenton	16 October 2004 (BBC Three) (Note: "The Sleeper" on 18 October 2004 on BBC One; the rest of the series would continue on BBC One two days after the BBC Three broadcast.)	6.48
Harry activates his first sleeper agent, university professor Fred Roberts for "Operation Flytrap". Section D detonates a bomb in an abandoned council house and spreads a rumour that two terrorists died while tampering with hypothetical red mercury created by Roberts to develop nuclear weapons. Section D proceed to ruin Roberts's life by arresting him, make his family leave him and put him in debt to make any potential buyers believe he would be selling the red mercury for financial security. He is later approached by Lawrence Sayle of Al–F Command, a Kyrgyzstan-based terrorist group. Over time, Tom becomes more concerned with Roberts's mental state. He ultimately undergoes an "exploding conscience" and sabotages the operation by attempting to take Roberts to his family. However, he is stopped and is decommissioned from MI5 as a result. The operation continues and MI5 are able to arrest Sayle and kill his accomplices who attempt to kill Roberts's family. Meanwhile, Zoe Reynolds starts a relationship with photographer Will North.
19	3	"Who Guards the Guards?"	Cilla Ware	Rupert Walters	23 October 2004 (BBC Three)	6.49
Danny Hunter is assigned to protect controversial Pakistani novelist Zuli when they are attacked by two gunmen, resulting in the wounding of bookseller Harakat. However, Adam notes that an assassin had a clear shot at Zuli but did not take it. As Zuli organises his own security, Danny befriends Harakat. Later, Section D find an aerial photograph of Mace talking with Muhammed Khordad, the head of terrorist group the Path of Light in Hebron, West Bank. Adam decides to meet the source of the image. However, Mace sends MI6 watchers to shadow him and intercept the meeting. Because Adam is an expert in countersurveillance, he eventually loses them. The source reveals that Harakat worked with the Path of Light until he betrayed them by becoming an MI6 asset to help stop them, and years later Khordad agrees to co-operate with the West, on the condition that they kill Harakat, who was the intended target all along. Harakat is killed by a hidden sniper of Mace's when Danny drives him to a safe house. Meanwhile, Zoe and Will's relationship flourishes. Harry has Adam transferred to Section D to fill in for Tom's position.
20	4	"A Prayer for My Daughter"	Cilla Ware	Ben Richards	30 October 2004 (BBC Three)	6.33
Influential United Nations negotiator Patricia Norton, of whom Adam is fond, is kidnapped and later found murdered. Adam discovers that a far-right pro-Israeli group called the November Committee, in which media mogul David Swift is a key member, was involved as they wanted her to cease any peace talks between Israel and the Palestinian territories. Section D finds evidence that the next target could be pro-Palestinian MP Nicholas Ashworth. Knowing that Catherine Townsend, Harry's estranged daughter, works with Ashworth, Danny is sent in to befriend her as she may be an agent with the November Committee, though it is later revealed she is trying to expose it. Ashworth's boyfriend Richard Hollins turns out to be the committee agent. When Adam finds that Swift was complicit in Norton's death, he blackmails him into leaving the country by having his wife, Fiona, an MI6 officer, fake a sexual assault case against him. Meanwhile, Will proposes to Zoe. However, Danny also learns that Will's brother Andy leaked photographs of the episode's investigation to the press. In fact, Will's brother got copies of the photographs without Will's knowledge.
21	5	"Love and Death"	Justin Chadwick	David Wolstencroft	6 November 2004 (BBC Three)	5.00
Danny and Zoe are assigned to follow rogue scientist Eric Newland, an expert in plague bacteria, to a North Sea ferry, with the hopes of dissuading him from selling biological weapons to North Korean buyers. However, Government Communications Headquarters (GCHQ) learn a deal has already been made, and the two are now ordered to kill Newland by overdosing him on insulin, as he is a diabetic. Zoe is unable to perform the task as she is suffering from seasickness, so Danny reluctantly carries it out with some persuasion and support from Adam. As this transpires, Ruth Evershed is interested in a man she was spying on, but could not bring herself to start a relationship with him. Later, Danny tells Zoe about Will's brother leaking the photographs. Feeling Will betrayed her trust, Zoe breaks off their engagement.
22	6	"Persephone"	Justin Chadwick	Ben Richards	13 November 2004 (BBC Three)	5.46
Zoe is put on trial for involuntary manslaughter of undercover police officer Hasan Doyan while she was undercover to stop the Turkish Mafia from transporting weapons to the UK. Zoe allegedly talked member Sevilin Ozal into killing his boss Emre Celenk, which also resulted in the murder of Doyan. Before the jury makes a decision, Zoe confides in Danny in a development that should not be disclosed to the public; Harry and Adam believed Celenk had connections with Al-Qaeda. When this was confirmed, Zoe did talk Ozal into killing him, but did not expect Doyan's death. Later, despite assurances from Attorney General Lord Young that Zoe would only get away with a "slapped wrist", she is found guilty and sentenced to ten years imprisonment. Angered, Harry accuses Young of running a show trial for Doyan's family. Harry arranges for Zoe to escape to Chile with a new identity while a stand in would serve the sentence, but she refuses to go. Danny, who earlier admitted to being in love with her, convinces her to go, and the two tearfully say goodbye.
23	7	"Outsiders"	Bill Anderson	Raymond Khoury	20 November 2004 (BBC Three)	5.74
Nine people die after taking paracetamol. Section D finds that a computer hacker breached the database of a pharmaceutical company and tainted select batches of the drug with a poison. Later, the hacker wipes out several bank accounts. Section D and the National Hi-Tech Crime Unit (NHTCU) trace the hacking to a mosque. However, when a special forces team storm it, they find nothing. The hacker strikes again, manipulating traffic lights and redirecting 999 calls to sex chat lines. Adam later realises Islamic extremists are not involved when he hears the hacker demanding £100 million in diamonds. Ruth has dinner with NHTCU officer Andrew Forrestal when she realises he is the hacker, and is kidnapped. He reveals his motives: he invented a universal decryption algorithm, which allows the user to hack into any computer system; however, his colleagues took all the credit for it. He is given the diamonds, but dies later because they were coated with synthetic cobra venom. Meanwhile, Danny has trouble dealing with Zoe's departure. Will confronts him about her whereabouts. Despite being under Harry's orders not to reveal her location to him, Danny eventually tells Will she is in Chile. Later, Danny learns from a postcard that Zoe and Will are back together.
24	8	"Celebrity"	Bill Anderson	Howard Brenton	27 November 2004 (BBC Three)	5.19
Knighted rock star Riff and his supermodel wife B request MI5's assistance when their infant son, Alfie, is kidnapped. Mace transfers Fiona to MI5 to work undercover and befriend B. However, Adam grows concerned with her cocaine use during the operation. When the kidnappers eventually demand £3 million, Section D plants the money with tracking devices, which are disabled when the kidnappers put them under magnets in a scrapyard. Furthermore, Alfie is found dead outside the couple's house. Fiona learns B arranged the kidnapping with the help of Italian drug running friend Rudolphino Ponti for publicity. What she did not anticipate was Alfie's death, which has been ruled as an accident. When Riff learns of this, he wounds Ponti, kills B and then himself. Meanwhile, politician John Sylvester, on Mace's suggestion, takes the opportunity to cover up the accidental murder of a young woman he had an affair with by resigning his post. However, Harry and Adam know the truth, and they leak it to the press, which would result in his arrest.
25	9	"Frequently Asked Questions"	Alrick Riley	Rupert Walters	4 December 2004 (BBC Three)	4.92
British Army officer turned mercenary Robert Morgan is arrested after he is found digging on a Soviet weapons cache near a Royal Air Force base, containing a missing laser designated missile. Knowing an attack is imminent in 72 hours, Danny and Adam play "good cop, bad cop" using the latter's interrogation methods to extract the information. However, Danny grows concerned with Adam's methods after learning that Adam himself was tortured in Yemen. They later find Morgan has a daughter needing a liver transplant. At the same time, Fiona discovers he is working with the Anglo-West Africa oil company, who plan to attack the headquarters of a rival company. After threatening to leave his daughter behind in the building, Morgan reveals the location of his accomplices. Meanwhile, Harry has been shortlisted to replace the Director General of MI5, who is retiring. He asks Ruth to prepare him for an interview, even though he does not want the promotion; the position would be awarded to another candidate.
26	10	"The Suffering of Strangers"	Alrick Riley	Ben Richards	13 December 2004 (BBC One)	5.33
"Butterfly", an asset of Danny and Fiona, informs MI5 of a possible sarin gas attack against the London Underground during a speech the Prime Minister will make regarding the Iraq War. However, "Butterfly" is killed by an Iraqi terror cell led by Ahmed. On Fiona's birthday, the cell leads Danny and Fiona into a trap, revealing that the threat was a distraction to capture the two; Ahmed threatens to kill them unless the Prime Minister withdraws forces from Iraq. Adam learns of this when a female cell member, Khatera Abuzeid, is assigned to handle him. Danny and Fiona attempt to escape but are caught. Because Danny killed a guard in the attempt, Ahmed gives Adam an ultimatum; choose which of the two must die as retribution. Danny, in a bid to save Fiona, provokes Ahmed and is executed as a result. Khatera forces Adam to send her to the function the Prime Minister will attend. By then, Khatera reveals she has a bomb inside her stomach that will release a chemical agent when the Prime Minister enters. No longer wanting to die, Khatera surrenders and reveals Fiona's location to MI5. Special forces arrive in time to kill Ahmed and his men before they can burn Fiona alive. As Adam and Fiona reunite, Ruth grieves over Danny's demise.

== Cast ==
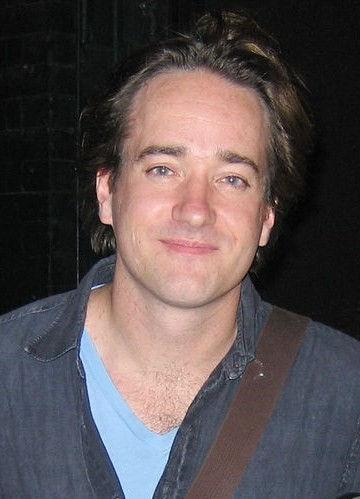
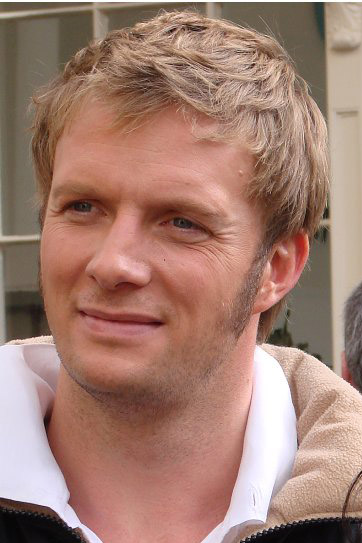
Matthew Macfadyen (left) returns as Tom Quinn. Macfadyen wanted to leave the series after two episodes. Rupert Penry-Jones (right) plays Adam Carter, a character who would take over Tom's position after the third episode.

The third series includes nine main cast members. Matthew Macfadyen returns as Tom Quinn in the first two episodes. Macfadyen intended to leave the series as he felt "your senses get dull doing a long-running TV show." As the producers were storylining the third series, they were "99 per cent sure" Macfadyen would not return until they heard he wanted to come back for two episodes because he did not want to leave the series so soon. Keeley Hawes also returns in the series as Zoe Reynolds. Hawes wanted to leave the series also after the first six episodes. David Oyelowo makes a return as Danny Hunter. After Tom's exit, it allowed Danny's character to develop further. Oyelowo also announced his intention to leave the series, after the finale episode. Peter Firth returns as superior Harry Pearce. After two seasons, Firth attempted to lighten Harry up "a little bit" after his mother suggested the character "smile more," despite the fact that Harry is a serious man. Nicola Walker returns as Ruth Evershed. First appearing in the second series, Walker felt more like the "new girl," but felt more experienced upon her return to the third. Shauna Macdonald also returns as Sam Buxton. The five-month filming gap between series two and three left Macdonald "a bit de-Spookified" as she was more focused on her film career. Hugh Simon and Rory MacGregor return as Malcolm Wynn-Jones and Colin Wells, respectively.

When the producers knew Macfadyen would leave, the producers decided to introduce new cast members, one of which was Rupert Penry-Jones as Adam Carter, the new protagonist. Early on in the creation of Adam, the producers had an interest in casting Penry-Jones for the role; however, it took the actor three auditions until the producers finally decided to cast him. Unlike Tom, Adam would have a different character dynamic; he has an MI6 background, and is married. A change from the girlfriend/boyfriend storyline for Tom and Ellie Simm in the first series, the producers noted it is common for secret service officers to be in a relationship with others in the same field of work. This led to the introduction of Fiona Carter, portrayed by Olga Sosnovska. Sosnovska was previously approached to appear in the second series, but was unavailable. She later auditioned for Fiona, and was later told she won the part when she was in New York City. The actress was only given a brief on her character—a ball breaker, ultimate professional, cold and calculated—which did not give her much to work with. Sosnovska initially found Fiona irritating in the fourth episode, but later opened up to the character after her return in the seventh.

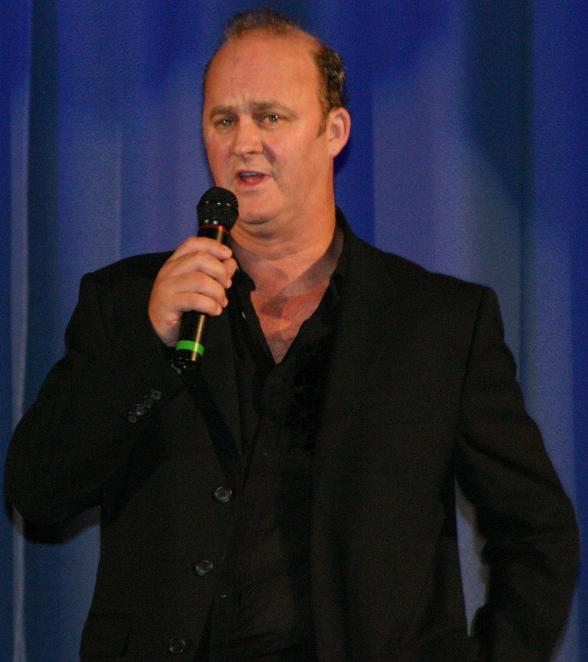
Tim McInnerny guest stars as JIC chairman Oliver Mace in three episodes.

The third series also sees a number of recurring characters and guest appearances. Megan Dodds returns as CIA liaison Christine Dale in the first episode. Tim McInnerny recurs as JIC chairman Oliver Mace. McInnerny was better known as a comedic actor, particularly for his role in Blackadder, but the producers felt that quality made Mace a more menacing character. Richard Harrington plays Will North, Zoe's boyfriend turned fiancé. Ian McDiarmid guest stars as Fred Roberts. The producers noted that McDiarmid played Roberts with the right amount of vulnerability, strength and stubbornness. Indian actor Anupam Kher appears as Harakat in "Who Guards the Guards?". Oyelowo stated that Kher had an "instant quality of likeness," which can make the audience sympathise with Danny after Harakat is killed in the episode.

"Love and Death" sees two guest stars who were personally involved with the cast and crew. Dermot Crowley, portrayer of Eric Newland, was the husband of one of the series' casting directors, though Crowley still had to earn his role. Barnaby Kay plays Ruth's potential love interest; Kay was Nicola Walker's real-life boyfriend, now her husband. Andy Serkis guest stars as Riff in "Celebrity". Created as an eccentric character, the producers believed it would fit in with Serkis' acting. Owen Teale appears as Robert Morgan in "Frequently Asked Questions". Producer Andrew Woodhead stated that Teale has a "strong physicality" that would make him a suitable equal for Adam. The series finale, "The Suffering of Strangers", saw the introduction of two new characters that would receive expanded roles in the fourth series. Raza Jaffrey portrays Zafar Younis. Jaffrey's first day of filming required him to perform a difficult speech he had to "launch into." In addition James Dicker portrays Wes Carter, Adam and Fiona's seven-year-old son. The producers held discussions whether to introduce Wes in the finale or in the fourth series; they eventually chose the former.

== Production ==
=== Crew ===
The third series of Spooks was produced by Kudos Film and Television for the BBC. Much of the production crew from the first two series returned. New crew members were brought in with the requirement that they were fans of the series and have ambition, so that they can understand Spooks. Andrew Woodhead was the series producer, with Jane Featherstone, Simon Crawford Collins and Gareth Neame as executive producers. Collins, who was the producer for the first two series, had to step back to executive producer, as he was overcommitted producing Kudos crime series Hustle. Woodhead replaced him as he was accustomed to the show, but also added more vitality to the show. Christopher Aird was the assistant producer. The third series included five writers. Howard Brenton wrote the first, second and eighth episodes. Rupert Walters wrote the third and ninth episodes. Ben Richards wrote the fourth, sixth and tenth episodes. Richards previously wrote the ninth episode of series two, and accepted the offer to return. His script in the second series was his first script for television; he found writing easier as time went by. Raymond Khoury wrote the seventh episode. Series creator David Wolstencroft wrote the fifth episode. Wolstencroft was poised to write the next episode, but found himself committed to other projects.

There were five directors, each directing two episodes; Jonny Campbell, Cilla Ware, Justin Chadwick, Bill Anderson, and Alrick Riley. Featherstone wanted Campbell to direct for Spooks after they worked together producing the television series Glasgow Kiss. He was drawn to directing the first two episodes because of Brenton's writing and the fact he would give Tom a send off. Faith Penhale was the series script executive. Simon Chaudoir, Jake Polonsky, Kieran McGuigan, Sue Gibson and Baz Irvine were the directors of photography. Barney Pilling and Paul Knight were the series editors. Stevie Herbert and Robert Foster were production designers. Jennie Muskett and Sheridan Tongue composed the original music. David Myers was the make-up designer, whilst Iain Macauley was the costume designer. Mark Doman designed the on-screen computer graphics, films surveillance shots and television footage from the series' point of view. On occasion, crew members appeared as extras. For instance, pictures of every crew member were used as students and faculty for a university database in "The Sleeper". In "Love and Death", the crew members present on the ferry appeared as extras in a bar scene. Collins also voiced a florist on a telephone message at the end of the same episode.

=== Writing ===
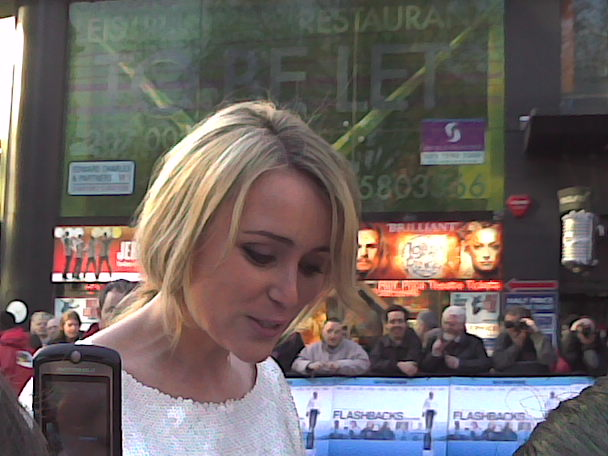

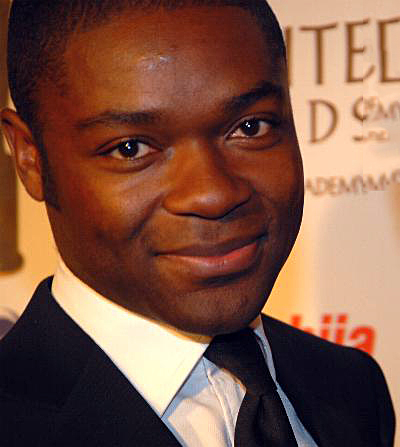
Following the example of Matthew Macfadyen, by the end of the third series, actors Keeley Hawes (above) and David Oyelowo (below) leave Spooks. Oyelowo requested that Danny be killed off.

In producing the third series, the goal was to "raise the bar" higher to satisfy and surprise the audience. The second series finale, "Smoke and Mirrors", ended on a cliffhanger which left Tom's fate open. The producers were unsure whether Macfadyen would return at the time they began storylining. Brenton had already written the first two episodes as if he was not coming back. When Macfadyen announced his return for those episodes, they had to be rewritten. Brenton went through a "nightmare" rewriting the first episode as he "dug this enormous hole, and [he] had no idea how to get out of it." It became a long process of growing the story where Tom turns the tables against Joyce. To make a suitable send off to the character, Brenton did not want Tom to be disillusioned; instead he wanted him to "sort of [become] a human being," as there have been real life instances where spies are attracted to the idea that "the world's a stage to them all the time," but later on they start to unravel.

Tom's exit allowed the writers to pull the focus on the other characters, namely Danny and Zoe, to give the show more of an ensemble feel. Overall, the producers made the third series more character driven. Raymond Khoury felt that because the length of a Spooks episode is one and half times longer than the average American television episode, the writers could use the extra time to flesh out the characters. Khoury also noted another difference between Spooks and American television is that most American seasons usually consists of 22 episodes, much of those episodes are more plot driven, while Spooks series three only had 10 and hence all of them contain some character development. The main character developments include Zoe's relationship with Will, which Danny did not like because he was in love with her. The writers initially wanted to expand on the potential Danny and Sam Buxton relationship which began in the second series, but the idea was dropped in favour of his affection towards Zoe, as the producers believed that was delivering more. Harry was given more depth by introducing his estranged daughter in "Who Guards the Guards?". Through the daughter's introduction, Harry would appear more human as opposed to the boss who "barks orders" to his officers. When Hawes announced she wanted to leave, Richards decided to write a "big episode" to give Zoe a decent send off. Richards did not want to kill off the character, as he deemed it predictable. Oyelowo eventually decided to leave the series as well between filming episodes four and five; by then the finale was not yet written. The actor wanted Danny to be killed off, reasoning that since Tom and Zoe left as disgraced officers, having Danny leave a disgraced officer also would be "one time too many" for a series that is meant to second guess the audience. In addition, Oyelowo did not want the "lingering thought" of a possible return. The producers wanted to use Danny's death as a powerful end to the series.

"The Sleeper" sees the MI5 team in a different light, going to great lengths to get the sleeper agent, Fred Roberts, to do what they want him to do so that the producers can make the audience sympathise with the character, as well as despise the main characters on some level for their methods. There were other instances of the main character going through great lengths to solve the case, including Adam's interrogation methods, brinking on torture, in "Frequently Asked Questions". "Love and Death" sees Danny and Zoe ordered to carry out an assassination. Wolstencroft did not want to do it lightly, as he wanted somebody like Danny going through "something dreadful." He previously did it before with the death of Helen Flynn in "Looking After Our Own", but "Love and Death" did this in the point of view of the killer, not the victim. "Celebrity" introduces a new plot style, which does not involve terror threats. Brenton wrote it as a more light-hearted episode that saw the characters emmeshed in a world they cannot handle. Despite this, Collins stated that MI5 do other duties other than fighting terrorism, though they would not gain as much media attention. Penhale also stated MI5 in the episode are in a way protecting the country, as if a national icon is under threat, the country's morale could drop. "Who Guards the Guards?" and "Frequently Asked Questions" were considered for the second series, but because there was not room for them, the producers bumped the episodes back to the third series.

==== Research and realism ====
One of the difficult things about looking at these organisations is it's very hard to find out what the successful operations were. You always hear about what went wrong, and you know think of the IRA in the 80s with the Brighton bombing or the mortaring of number 10. Obviously nobody tells you; "Well, we stopped ten other of those," otherwise because they reveal their sources.

— Rupert Walters

Although the series fictionalises the world of MI5, several storylines are based on truth. The series had advisors who were ex-MI5 officers. The producers wanted to use world events that Britain and America were directly or indirectly responsible for, where the consequences of an operation are worse than the problems they were intended to resolve, known as blowback. One example is the two powers aiding the Afghan Mujahideen in 1989 before pulling out of the country; this ultimately led to the rise of Al-Qaeda.

Brenton modelled Fred Roberts in "The Sleeper" on the weapons scientist David Kelly, who committed suicide in July 2003 after he was outed as the source of BBC journalist Andrew Gilligan's story alleging the British government "sexed up" the September Dossier about weapons of mass destruction in Iraq. "Who Guards the Guards?" sees a rivalry between MI5 and MI6. According to the producers, there have been documented rivalries between the two organisations. The episode also referenced a true story of a man joining a militant group who was paid with a Russian army helicopter, as the group could not afford to pay him in cash. "A Prayer for My Daughter" deals with the Israeli–Palestinian conflict. Because the topic is controversial, it was a difficult area to work with without offending people from both sides. The producers made the episode as neutral as possible by consulting with experts from both sides of the conflict. Richards also wanted to fairly represent it by addressing the issue as political and not religious.

The producers learned from an ex-MI5 officer that it is common for intelligence gatherers who spend most of their work listening in to other people to fall in love with civilians through just their voices. This story was the basis of Ruth wanting to go out with John in "Love and Death". Khoury based "Outsiders" on Internet security. He already knew the area, as he once worked for an internet company. Although the story is dramatised, Khoury did research on what was feasible, such as if one man and a laptop could theoretically bring Britain to its knees. "Frequently Asked Questions" deals with interrogation and torture. Walters realised that torture is counterproductive as the suspects can say anything the interrogators want to hear, but rationalises that Adam is an expert in that field. To get the interrogation as true to life as possible, the producers consulted with ex-Army advisors who were trained in questioning terror suspects. As the episode was first broadcast, a prison abuse scandal in Iraq was in the news. In response to this, Kudos director Stephen Garrett stated "Spooks is really well researched and sometimes we look like we're ahead of the game. It's just we know stuff that's happening, and it'll come out in the news a bit later on." In the same episode, the weapons caches came from a true story that the Russians hid weapons in Britain during the Cold War, according to Collins.

=== Filming and editing ===
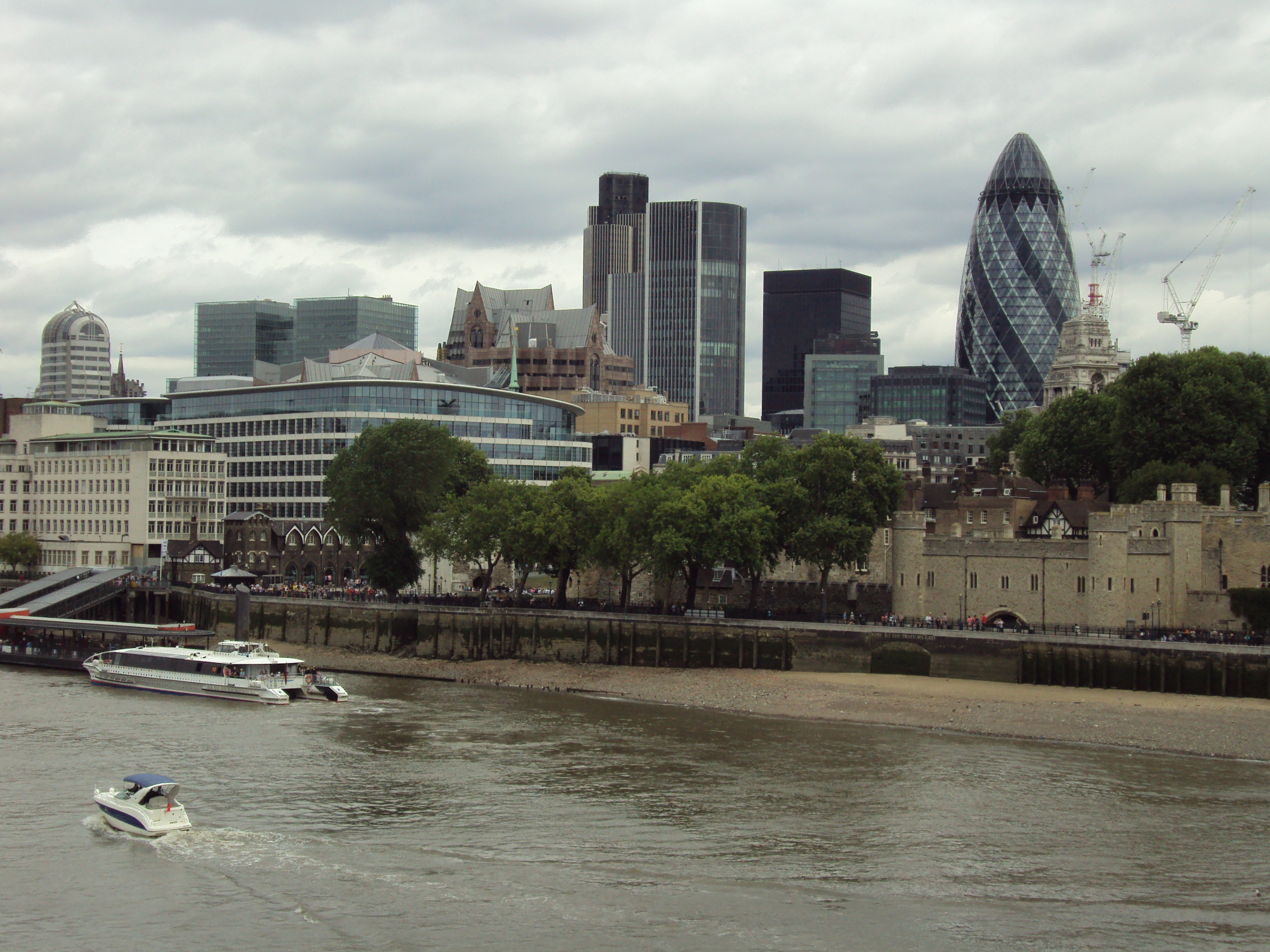
The series was almost entirely filmed throughout London

The third series was filmed across five blocks of two episodes, with a director in each block. Filming began in London in January 2004, and took up to 140 days spanning seven months. Each filming day typically lasted eleven hours. Scheduling was often tight throughout the shoot; sometimes the production crew had to "double up" on locations, and the cast often had to learn six pages of dialogue a day. The majority of cameras were handheld, and the filming crew used a variety of lenses, including long-focus lenses, fisheye lenses, and swing and tilt lenses. The first two series was shot with a Fujifilm stock. The third series saw a switch to a new type of Kodak stock, becoming the first television series to use this model.

Filming began in the middle of winter, which presented problems for the cast and filming crew. Some scenes were delayed because of bad weather, even snow at one point, and as a result scheduling became tighter. Another problem was the cold temperatures. The beginning scene in "Who Guards the Guards?", where Mace and Khordad meet in Hebron, was filmed on a roof garden in below zero temperatures; however, McInnerny and Paul Bhattacharjee wore summer clothes. To prevent hypothermia a heater was placed near them. The cameras used light-coloured filters to make the environment look warmer. However, winter did have an advantage of longer nights, making night scenes easier; summer nights would last as little as five hours. The producers hired real news presenters from Sky News and the programme London Tonight to present the news of the events from some episodes. All episodes begin with a recap from past episodes, which the producers regard as "an art in themselves" in terms of editing. The opening title sequence went through three changes over the course of the series. More split screen sequences were also added to create more tension for the audience. Overall, each episode took approximately six weeks to prepare, and would take approximately six weeks to edit.

==== Sets and locations ====
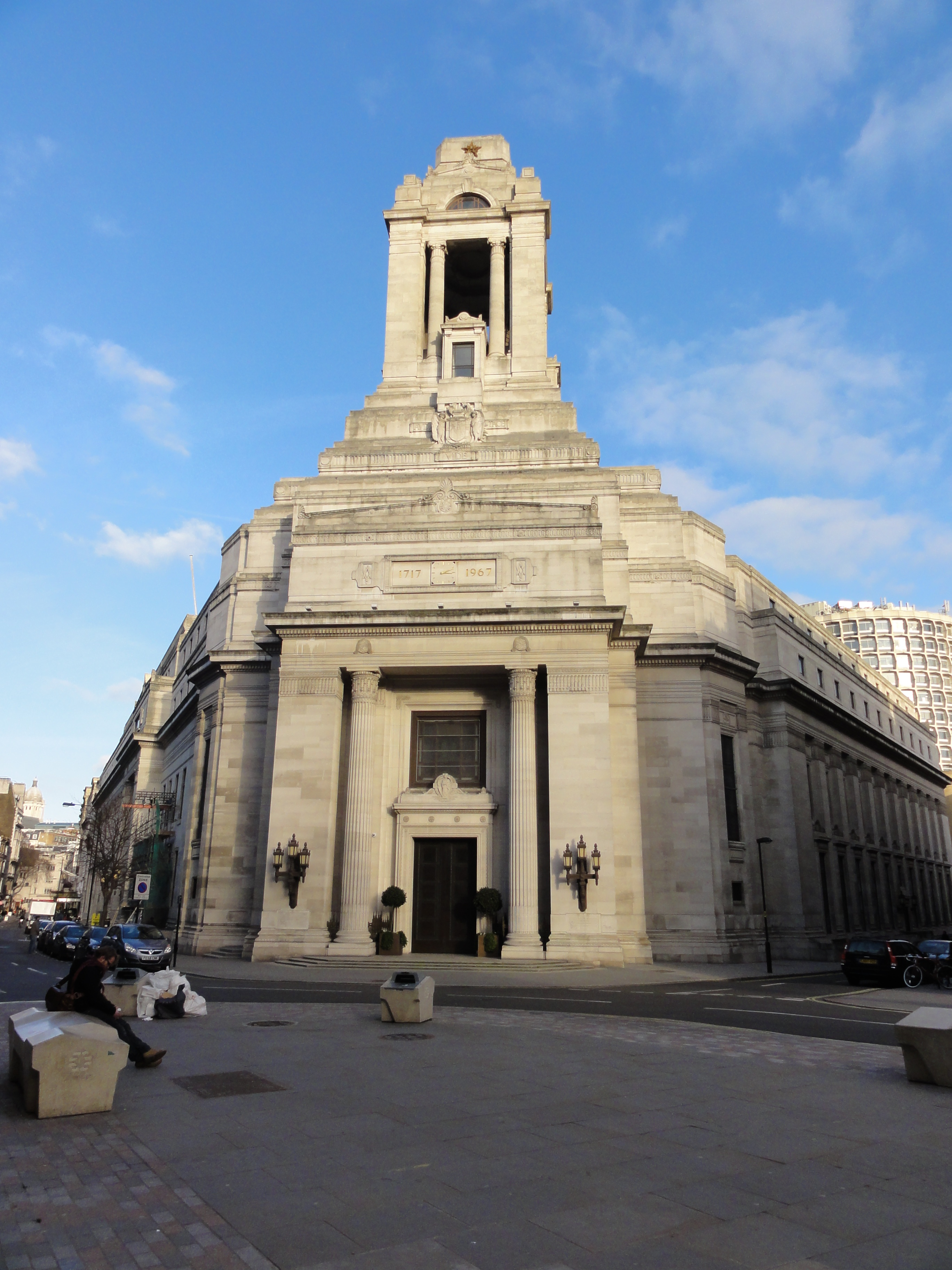
Freemasons' Hall doubled as Thames House, the headquarters of MI5. The Grid set was filmed in a separate location.

Shooting took place almost entirely in London. The directors somewhat followed the filming style of Bharat Nalluri, the director of the first two episodes of series one and two, who used London and the River Thames as characters in themselves. The exterior and interior of Freemasons' Hall continued to be a stand-in for Thames House, the headquarters of MI5. However, the Grid, the base of operations of Section D, was a set constructed at the fifth floor in another building. Danny's apartment was also filmed in the same building. Another constructed set was the back of mobile surveillance vans, which was housed near the Grid set.

Director Jonny Campbell helped search for several "interesting locations" for the first block to draw the audience with interesting visuals. This included a church in Smithfield and the Natural History Museum; in the latter's case, Campbell believed the location was "harking back" to traditional spy films. Filming there was expensive and management of the museum only allowed the crew to film for a few hours. The club Mace frequents was filmed at the Royal Automobile Club in Pall Mall. "The Sleeper" included scenes filmed at the University College London; a lecture room in the college was where the third series started filming. The explosion scene at the beginning of the episode was filmed at a council estate in Peckham. The estate was condemned for demolition, which proved to be a suitable location for a big explosion. The crew returned there again a month later to gather footage of the demolition work. Several exterior shots where Harry meets with government officials and his officers were filmed on walkways outside the Houses of Parliament. The upper-class home of Riff and B in "Celebrity" was filmed in a house in Kensington that was for sale for approximately £27 million at the time. Filming in public locations often took place on weekends, when they were closed off to the public. However, there were exceptions. Some scenes in "The Suffering of Strangers" were filmed outside the National Film Theatre in South Bank, a popular tourist destination. Shooting there became difficult as the crew had no control over the tourists. Other known London landmarks that were filmed at included Lord's Cricket Ground, St Martin-in-the-Fields, Tate Modern, the Old Bailey criminal court, Waterloo station, Empress State Building, and 30 St Mary Axe (the Gherkin).

"Love and Death" was filmed in an actual Stena Line ferry that travelled from Harwich to the Hook of Holland, Netherlands; Stena allowed the producers to film in the ferry, though the cabins were filmed in a constructed studio set. The two actors present, Hawes and Oyelowo took precautions to avoid seasickness before boarding. After filming on board concluded, both actors had to re-record some of the dialogue that was overshadowed by noises of the waves and engines.

=== Stunts and effects ===
The series' stunts were coordinated by Andy Bradford. Several cast members participated in stunt work. The first scene Penry-Jones filmed was a fight scene between three of Mace's men, which the actor performed himself. Macfadyen held a special driving licence allowing him to perform some stunt driving, such as skidding a car outside the Freemasons' Hall to drop off Joyce's body in "Project Friendly Fire". The sequence was considered for rescheduling due to snowfall before filming it, but the producers felt the icy road would become an advantage, and went ahead with it anyway. Several actors handled firearms during the shoot. One of scenes included Oyelowo and McGregor spent up to five hours firing guns at a shooting range for the beginning of "Love and Death", which Oyelowo stated was "the most fun" he ever had in the series. However, Penry-Jones was disappointed he was not given a gun at all throughout the third series.

In "Outsiders" a scene required a lorry crashing into a car in front of Danny. Oyelowo had to stand ten feet away from the crash. The production crew considered having Oyelowo wearing sunglasses to shield his eyes from any possible glass shards, but they later chose against it. There were scenes where some of the characters snorted cocaine. The "cocaine" was in actuality glucose powder that the actors did have to snort. Elsewhere, the crew used vegetable soup as vomit. The alcohol used in the series were made from non-alcoholic drinks; the production crew used fruit juices as wine, ginger ale as brandy, and cold tea as beer.

== Broadcast and reception ==
=== Broadcast and ratings ===
The series began broadcasting on 11 October 2004 on BBC One during the 9 to 10 pm timeslot, and continued on every Monday night until 13 December 2004. The second to ninth episodes were pre-empted on Saturday nights, starting 16 October 2004, on digital channel BBC Three. In the United States the series began broadcast on the A&E Network, where it is known as MI-5, from the start of 2005. However, because each episode last approximately an hour, 15 minutes had to be edited out on each to accommodate for advert breaks. However, the DVD release of the series in the United States included the episodes unedited.

The third series faced a decline in viewership from the second series. The season premiere received an overnight figure of six million viewers and a 25 per cent audience share. It was down almost two million from the series two premiere in June 2003, which was seen by 7.8 million. Ratings declines further as the series continues. The fifth episode dropped to five million. The penultimate episode dropped further to 4.5 million, though the finale rose slightly back to five million. However, it was also down from the seven million who saw the series two finale in August 2003. With consolidated figures factored in, the third series was seen by an average of 5.77 million viewers. (Note: See the ratings on the episode table above. Look up the top 30 weekly programmes from weeks ending 17 October to 19 December 2004 from the Broadcasters' Audience Research Board website.) Despite the ratings decline, the BBC already commissioned a fourth series of Spooks before the third series even began broadcasting.

=== Critical reception ===
Contender have once again delivered a fine package for Spooks' third season, and if this collection of episodes is not quite up to the level of those that preceded it, the quality of the presentation and exhaustive nature of the bonus materials almost make up for this.

— Michael Mackenzie of Home Cinema

The third series received generally favourable reviews. In review of the DVD release of the series, Michael Mackenzie of Home Cinema was disappointed by the "complete decimation of the group around which the show effectively revolved," and had reservations for the introductions of the new characters, stating "despite ardent protests from both cast and crew, Tom and Adam are almost exactly the same character. The same goes for his wife Fiona, who more or less steps into Zoe's shoes (they even look similar!), and in the final episode, it becomes abundantly clear that, in the next season, Zafar Younis (Raza Jaffrey) will be taking Danny's place while ensuring that the "minority" checkbox remains ticked." However, at the same time, Mackenzie thought "the psychology surrounding cast changes like these is extremely interesting." In terms of the storylines, the reviewer stated "Spooks' third season […] is something of a step down from both its predecessors," although the series "has a number of fine moments." Mackenzie ended up rating the series eight stars out of ten.

David Blackwell of the American review site Enterline Media said, "MI-5 really impressed me with the first two seasons. The third season does start out for the first three episodes before it reaches some highs and lows until it stabilizes with the last two episodes of season 3." He felt that Tom Quinn's exit was his favourite moment in the first two episodes, and that Adam is "just [as] cold" as Tom. He also praised the character development, stating "character development is excellent in this season. Danny receives great moments as he is brought into the spotlight from his feelings for Zoe to his conflicted feelings about things he does in the name of Queen and Country, but Danny doesn't break and let his emotions become a crutch like Tom did (when Tom wanted a sleeper agent not to do the job MI-5 wanted the sleeper to do)." Blackwell concluded by saying "sometime MI-5 fails as a show this season, but it still reaches levels of greatness. It will be interesting to see what they have in store for season 4."

=== Accolades and viewer polls ===
The third series was nominated for a total of seven British Academy Television Awards (BAFTAs). It was nominated for Best Drama Series, but lost out to the Channel 4 comedy-drama series Shameless. It also was nominated for four BAFTA Craft Awards, for Original Television Music, Photography & Lighting: Fiction/Entertainment, Production Design, and Graphic Design, none of which resulted in a win for Spooks. In addition it was nominated for two BAFTA Interactive Awards, with Spooks Interactive winning one of them. The interactive service, which provided Spooks viewers with an "extra dimension to the television experience" by allowing users to go through mock training sessions via remote control, also won an International iTV Awards.

The series was generally well received by fans; the BBC released a "Best of" viewer polls at the end of 2004, where Spooks was voted the second best drama, beaten only by the period drama series North and South. However, it was also voted number eight in the "Worst Drama" category. Firth, Oyelowo, Macfadyen and Penry-Jones were listed in the "Best Actor" category, being voted tenth, seventh, fifth, and third, respectively. Meanwhile, in the "Best Actress" category, Walker, Sosnovska and Hawes were voted ninth, fifth and fourth, respectively. Also, Hawes, Macfadyen, Sosnovska and Penry-Jones were voted a respective seventh, sixth, fifth and third most desirable star. Oliver Mace was voted the fifth best villain. The scene in which Danny is killed in the finale was voted the third "Favourite Moment".

== Home video release ==
The series was first released on DVD in Australia (Region 4) on 23 May 2005. It was later released in the United Kingdom (Region 2) on 5 September 2005, and in the United States (Region 1, where it is known as MI-5: Volume 3) on 31 January 2006. The box set consists of all 10 episodes of the third series on a five-disc set (three in Region 4) and 1.78:1 Anamorphic PAL screen format. The box set includes an array of special features. Each episode has its own audio commentary and behind the scenes featurette. In addition there are numerous interviews with the cast and crew of the series, including separate featurettes on Adam and Fiona Carter, as well as their portrayers. There are also deleted scenes, a featurette on the fourth series, image galleries, series credits (Spooks is a programme that does not include credits in its episodes), and scripts of the episode, the latter of which are found on DVD-ROM. In the United Kingdom, the box set was released with a "15" British Board of Film Classification (BBFC) certificate (unsuitable for viewers under the age of 15 years).
