= Spooks series 2 =

2nd series of the British television show Spooks

Spooks
- Season 2
- DVD cover art of Spooks series two
- No. of episodes: 10

Release
- Original network: BBC One; BBC Three
- Original release: 2 June – 11 August 2003

Season chronology
- ← Previous; Series 1 Next → Series 3

The second series of the British spy drama television series Spooks (known as MI-5 in the United States) began broadcasting on 2 June 2003 on BBC One, ending on 11 August 2003. It consists of ten episodes. Spooks centres on the actions of Section D, a counter-terrorism division of the British Security Service (MI5). Matthew Macfadyen, Keeley Hawes, David Oyelowo, Peter Firth, Hugh Simon, Shauna Macdonald, Rory MacGregor, Natasha Little, Nicola Walker, Megan Dodds, Jenny Agutter and Enzo Cilenti are listed as the main cast.

The second series was seen by an average of 7.19 million, and received generally favourable reviews from critics. The second episode attracted controversy for depicting a plot where a mosque is used to recruit suicide bombers; the controversy attracted near a thousand complaints and negative responses from key figures of Muslim groups across the United Kingdom. It was nominated for a British Academy Television Award (BAFTA) and a Royal Television Society Award, winning the latter. The second series was released on DVD on 20 September 2004 in Region 2, 11 January 2005 in Region 1, and 21 March 2005 in Region 4.

== Cast ==
=== Main ===
- Matthew Macfadyen as Tom Quinn
- Keeley Hawes as Zoe Reynolds
- David Oyelowo as Danny Hunter
- Shauna Macdonald as Sam Buxton
- Hugh Simon as Malcolm Wynn-Jones
- Rory MacGregor as Colin Wells
- Nicola Walker as Ruth Evershed
- Peter Firth as Harry Pearce

=== Guest ===
- Megan Dodds as Christine Dale
- Natasha Little as Vicki Westbrook
- Enzo Cilenti as Carlo Franceschini
- Jenny Agutter as Tessa Phillips
- Esther Hall as Ellie Simm
- Lorcan Cranitch as Patrick McCann
- Heather Cave as Maisie Simm
- Tomas Arana as Herman Joyce
- Benedict Cumberbatch as Jim North
- Sophie Okonedo as Amanda Roke
- Ruth Gemmell as Miranda
- Roshan Seth as Fazul Azzam

== Episodes ==
No. overall	No. in series	Title	Directed by	Written by	Original release date	UK viewers (millions)
7	1	"Legitimate Targets"	Bharat Nalluri	David Wolstencroft	2 June 2003 (BBC One)	8.16
Following "Lesser of Two Evils", the bomb in Tom Quinn's house fails to detonate, but another device goes off elsewhere, killing the Secretary of State for Northern Ireland. Patrick McCann is killed by his group for collaborating with Tom. Section D are then focused on a bombing at a secret military base in Longcross, when it has emerged that wanted Serbian war criminal Miroslav Gradic has entered Britain. Gradic's group has stolen munitions from Longcross and a military convoy to attack the British. Zoe Reynolds goes undercover to befriend Radovan (Rado) Petcovic, a Serbian embassy employee and Gradic's nephew. Following the uncovering of a MOD mole, Jim North (Benedict Cumberbatch), Section D learn that Rado is communicating with Gradic via newspaper classifieds. Malcolm Wynn-Jones decodes the next target, the Cabinet Office Briefing Rooms (COBRA) meeting Harry Pearce is attending; the team prevent the attack and arrest Gradic. Ellie Simm breaks up with Tom, realising that he will always prioritise work over her.
8	2	"Nest of Angels"	Bharat Nalluri	Howard Brenton	2 June 2003 (BBC Three) (Note: "Nest of Angels" was broadcast on 9 June 2003 on BBC One; the rest of the series (apart from the finale) would usually rebroadcast on BBC One seven days after the BBC Three broadcast.)	7.87
Section D investigate the activities of radicalised mullah Mohammed Rachid, and learn he is using a Birmingham mosque to recruit young suicide bombers. After the section's last asset is discovered and tortured, recent transfer from Government Communications Headquarters (GCHQ) Ruth Evershed finds another potential asset, Algerian agent Muhammed Ibhn Khaldun who faked his death to his agency and smuggled himself to the UK to defect. His defection soon attracts the attention of the Central Intelligence Agency (CIA), who also wish to use him. Khaldun infiltrates the cell and gains Rachid's trust, ultimately resulting in the mullah's arrest after the team find hidden bomb vests in his prayer room. Khaldun attempts to stop a 16-year-old boy from blowing himself up, but he fails and sacrifices himself to prevent any nearby casualties. Meanwhile, in an effort to get over Ellie, Tom starts a relationship with a doctor, Vicky Westbrook, who was introduced in the previous episode.
9	3	"Spiders" "Hackers"	Rob Bailey	Matthew Graham	9 June 2003 (BBC Three)	7.18
A computer hacker threatens to breach MI5's firewalls, putting the lives of two cornered agents in Pakistan at risk. When Section D suspect Gordon Blaney, a member of the Socialist Freedom Movement, an anti-government group, Zoe is tasked to go undercover as a teacher in the same comprehensive school Blaney teaches. Meanwhile, Danny Hunter works to infiltrate a left-wing newspaper where the socialists operate. It is later revealed that Blaney and the socialists were elaborately framed by the hacker, pupil Noah Gleeson. Noah is the son of Victor Gleeson, a former MI5 officer stationed in Greece; the boy underwent a psychotic break after witnessing Victor's murder. Now guided by the hallucinations of his dead father, Noah occupies Section D with a threat against the school as a diversion to gather Malcolm's access codes for MI5's "inner sanctum" (its mainframe). Tom and Zoe are able to stop him from succeeding, and Noah is apprehended and sent to a psychiatric hospital.
10	4	"Blood and Money"	Rob Bailey	Howard Brenton	16 June 2003 (BBC Three)	7.38
Banker Sir Richard Bowman and government advisor Amanda Roke request Harry's help when stock trader John Lightwood steals $1 billion from Bowman's bank and goes missing. When Lightwood is found literally crucified, Danny goes undercover as his replacement and learns Lightwood was laundering money for the Russian mafia, who stole $20 billion of aid money from the Americans, to a highly secure Swiss bank, and was killed for stealing from them. When Zoe is found to be having an unauthorised fling with a banker from the Swiss bank, Carlo Franceschini, Tom blackmails him to reveal the name of the mafia account holder; Victor Shvitkoy. Bowman and Roke admit they are in league with Shvitkoy, but planned to subvert him and steal the money back to the Americans. When Bowman tells Section D the account number of the remaining $19 billion, Danny manages to recover it. Danny is later kidnapped by fellow trader Maxim Baxter, revealed to be Shvitkoy's daughter. MI5 track and rescue him, and arrest Shvitkoy. Meanwhile, Tom discovers that Ruth is leaking information to GCHQ in exchange for her transfer to MI5, which jeopardised the operation. Tom decides to put her on probation.
11	5	"I Spy Apocalypse"	Justin Chadwick	Howard Brenton	23 June 2003 (BBC Three) (Note: "I Spy Apocalypse" was rebroadcast on BBC One two weeks after its original BBC Three broadcast, on 7 July 2003.)	6.30
The Grid (the team's offices) is in lockdown for an EERIE (Extreme Emergency Response Initiative Exercise) drill of a hypothetical terrorist attack in London. With Tom as the emergency executive officer, the team is told that VX nerve gas has been released and is spreading across the city, and conclude that the attack is real. The Grid loses power, and the trapped team try to make contact with the outside world. They soon exhibit signs of cabin fever, especially after they find out that Harry is infected. Some of the team believe the gas has leaked itself into the Grid, and two Home Office executives, Bridget Macy and Mark Woolley, attempt to escape. After Tom is forced to shoot them, it is revealed that the threat was a drill all along, and Tom receives top marks for his leadership skills (the guns were loaded with dummy rounds). Tom decides to break up with troublesome Vicky.
12	6	"Without Incident" "President's Visit"	Justin Chadwick	David Wolstencroft	7 July 2003 (BBC Three)	6.00 (Note: Official data for the consolidated viewing figures for that week was not made available on the BARB website, only overnight ratings data would be available)
When United States President George W. Bush is making a brief unannounced visit to the UK, CIA liaison Christine Dale works with MI5 to ensure the visit goes smoothly. Vicky, bitter over the break up, releases Tom's address and phone numbers on personal advertisements, falsely promoting him as a call boy, on telephone boxes and nightclubs throughout Soho, garnering him some unwanted attention. He has Sam Buxton find and destroy all copies of the ads, while Christine confronts Vicky to make her stop the harassment when the latter is jeopardising the operation. The team find a suspicious microlight flying towards Chequers, the Prime Minister's country retreat, as a credible threat is made, but it is revealed to be a false alarm. At the end of the episode, Tom and Christine begin seeing each other.
13	7	"Clean Skin"	Ciaran Donnelly	Simon Mirren	14 July 2003 (BBC Three)	6.90
Harry's house is burgled by small time thieves, with a briefcase among the items stolen. The briefcase contains files relating to "Firestorm", a specialist electromagnetic pulse weapon developed by rogue French scientist Henri Durand, who is selling the weapon to Chinese buyers. Harry and Tom find the thieves, among them 14-year-old Jason James "JJ" Franks, and discover that they burned the files, including the codes needed to steal Firestorm. When it is revealed that JJ knows the codes thanks to his eidetic memory, Tom decides to use him as a clean skin, a deniable asset to steal Firestorm from Durand's labs before Jean-Luc Goyon of the Directorate-General for External Security (DGSE) can steal it first. JJ reluctantly agrees to the mission despite reservations that MI5 would deny his existence should he be caught. The boy succeeds and steals the laptop with the Firestorm files while Jean-Luc has Durand assassinated. JJ hands over the laptop to Tom, who offers him a future with MI5. However, JJ turns down the offer.
14	8	"Strike Force" "Military Strikes"	Ciaran Donnelly	Steve Bailie	21 July 2003 (BBC Three)	6.68
Running on a tip from Corporal Eric Woods that Samuel Curtis, a decorated British Army Major, is plotting a mutiny to get the government to make improvements to the military, Tom goes undercover as a soldier to uncover the plot. After two weeks, an increasingly frustrated Tom finds no evidence that Curtis is planning such an action, only that he is starting a petition instead. However, during an interrogation exercise, Woods unintentionally reveals the MI5 operation to Curtis, who is indeed plotting a mutiny. Curtis captures Tom and Danny and has his platoon hijack a shipment of radioactive waste. The major gives the government an ultimatum; start improving the military within one hour, or he would blow the waste. As Tom gets Curtis to stand down, Harry orders a sniper to kill him. This action angers Tom, who begins to be disillusioned by his work. Harry orders Tom to end his relationship with Christine. Meanwhile, Ruth fears she will be transferred back to GCHQ as they put her under review. Harry gets Ruth a secondment in order for her to stay.
15	9	"The Seventh Division" "A Very Corporate Coup"	Sam Miller	Ben Richards	28 July 2003 (BBC Three)	6.92
Eight Customs & Excise officers are killed by the Chala, a ruthless Colombian cartel led by Rafa Morrientes, who is in England to meet with powerful businessman Ross Vaughan. Tom and Zoe go undercover to befriend Mariela Hernandez, Rafa's girlfriend, while Danny spies on Rafa's meetings. There, Section D learns that Rafa is trading cocaine for surface-to-air missiles with Vaughan's help. Meanwhile, Sam unknowingly spies on the team for former officer Tessa Phillips, who was fired for running phantom agents for monetary gain, under the guise that she is Harry's superior. Tessa offers to supply the team with information needed to stop Rafa from her Spanish contacts. However, Harry decides to suspend her contacts. After Tom and Zoe turn Mariela to seduce Vaughan for information, Tessa exposes Mariela's treachery to Rafa, who murders her. After the deal for the missiles is intercepted, an unidentified party kills Rafa, while Tessa flees the country to escape Harry's reprisal. Tom is disgusted to hear from Harry that they will not pursue Vaughan any further, placing the two at further odds. Tom continues to see Christine behind Harry's back.
16	10	"Smoke and Mirrors" "Pit of Secrets"	Sam Miller	Howard Brenton	11 August 2003 (BBC One)	7.32
Christine hands Tom a CIA document indicating that a terrorist cell is hiring Michael Karharias, an American assassin, to kill a member of the British Cabinet. Tom enlists the help of Danny and Zoe to catch Karharias. Danny follows Tom and finds he is creating a legend, something Tom denies. When they follow CIA agent Zeigler, the three are captured, where it appears their captors are working with Tom. Danny and Zoe are left to escape and inform Harry of what they believe; that Tom has become a traitor. Tom, meanwhile, learns that Zeigler is, in fact, Herman Joyce, a legendary CIA agent who holds Tom responsible for ruining his daughter's life—Tom recruited the daughter for an operation that went wrong, she is now at a psychiatric hospital—and is framing him for a planned assassination; Karharias was in fact killed by Joyce. Joyce's team tricks Tom into handling a Gepard M1 sniper rifle, which is later used to kill the Chief of the Defence Staff. Supposedly expert agents Harry, Danny, and Zoe are easily duped, ignore Tom's claims of being set up, and inform him that Joyce has been dead for five years. Harry is about to call for back-up, but Tom shoots him and disappears into the North Sea.

== Broadcast and reception ==
=== Broadcast and ratings ===
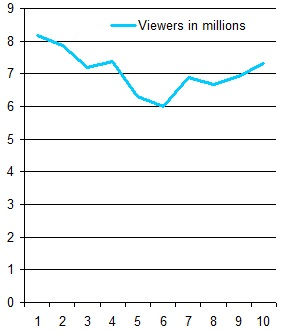
Ratings for the second series.

The second series began broadcasting on 2 June 2003 on BBC One during the 9 to 10 pm timeslot, and continued on every Monday night until 11 August 2003, although there was a week break in the schedule midway through the series due to an overrun of a Wimbledon tennis match on 30 June. The second to ninth episodes were pre-empted to BBC Three a week before they are repeated on BBC One. In the US, the second series aired on A&E, though each episode had approximately fifteen minutes edited out to accommodate for advert breaks. The DVD release of the series in America contained the uncut episodes. It was later repeated on BBC America, alongside the first series from July 2007.

The second series began with overnight viewing figures of 7.8 million. The second episode lowered slightly to 7.6 million viewers, which was about a third of the television audience, while the third episode dropped to 6.9 million viewers, and the fourth rose slightly to 7.2 million, often winning its timeslot against repeats of ITV1's The Darling Buds of May. Following the week interruption from Wimbledon, the fifth episode slipped to 6.1 million, and to six million for the sixth episode, before the seventh episode rose to 6.6 million. Overnight ratings rose to seven million for the second series finale. With consolidated figures factored in, the second series was seen by a per-episode average of 7.19 million viewers. (Note: See the ratings on the episode table above. Look up the top 30 weekly programmes from weeks ending 8 June to 17 August 2003 from the Broadcasters' Audience Research Board website. Consolidated ratings for the sixth episode is unavailable however)

=== Critical reception ===
The second series received generally favourable reviews. Gord Lacey of TVShowsOnDVD called the second series "such a fun series", a "plausible spy show" and "a great show, [...] another solid BBC release." Dennis Landmann of MovieFreak stated that the season "rules" as it "tells complex, dangerous, and relevant stories that creates high octane, powerful drama", and the producers "create top notch work, from the excellent cinematography to the great-looking sets and locations, and from well researched and sweet scripts to solid acting by the principal actors." Landmann noticed the main focus towards Tom throughout the series that builds until he "becomes somewhat of a haunted soul" with the final minutes being "so powerful they affected how I felt for the next couple of days; I kept thinking about the character and the tragic events that happened to him". The reviewer summed up by stating "the second season improves on the first" and rated it nine out of ten.

Anyone who has seen the first season of [Spooks] figured out very fast that the show has absolutely no problem doing the unexpected, or doing terrible, terrible, oh-god-so-terrible things to its main characters. If you have seen it, you know exactly what I mean. There is nothing worse than the cynical disbelief of an action/drama show where you know the main characters are going to escape without any harm, because hey, they're the good guys, and they have to come back and make a new season. Absolutely nothing in [Spooks] is so clear-cut. It keeps you on your toes.

— Adam Arseneau of DVD Verdict

Michael Mackenzie of The Digital Fix commented that "the chain events leading up to the chaotic final episode" was "extremely set up", even though he opined that Macfadyen had "always been the weakest actor in the ensemble". He also felt that there were instances where stories "go nowhere", including the Zoe and Carlo storyline. However, Mackenzie felt it was the strongest series out of the first three, saying it "remains some of the best television to be produced on this blighted isle in years" and rated it an eight out of ten. Adam Arseneau of DVD Verdict compared the series to 24 and The Wire. Arseneau stated that it clicks "on nearly every level required: great acting performances, fantastic story lines, well-written dialogue, gritty authenticity, and most importantly, unpredictability," summing the series as "sleek, stylish, tense, and compelling—some of the best television I have had the pleasure to watch".

Not all reviews were positive. Holly E Ordway of DVD Talk disliked the series, stating "I'd heard that it was a gripping, intelligent series that told great spy-thriller stories with gritty realism [...] Well, it seems [Spooks] and I are not meant to be together; I bounced off the show on the very first episode and never succeeded afterwards in bringing myself to like it any better." Ordway further felt it was "poorly acted", the rapid cuts and frantic editing "doesn't work" to make it more entertaining, and that the attempts for complexity were "painful".

=== Muslim controversy ===
The second series attracted controversy for its second episode, which depicted Islamic extremism at a mosque as a base of operations. The episode attracted around 800 complaints following its original BBC Three broadcast, with many appealing not to repeat it on BBC One. It was repeated, and attracted a further 150 complaints. The Broadcasting Standards Commission dismissed some of the complaints as the episode was presented as a drama and not a factual account. After the episode aired, a Muslim student in Birmingham was assaulted, and the Birmingham Central Mosque was vandalised, allegedly as a result of the show. The BBC denied that the episode had any influence on the incidents however, and the West Midlands Police ruled that there was no evidence linking the attacks to the programme.

The episode also received negative reactions from key members of many Muslim organisations across the country. Inayat Bunglawala of the Muslim Council of Britain stated "the programme, which was of a very sensational nature, unfortunately only serves to reinforce many negative stereotypes of British Muslims. Instead of being a well-informed piece of film-making, this episode of Spooks pandered to grossly offensive and Islamophobic caricatures of imams, Muslim students and mosques." Ahtsham Ali of the Islamic Society of Britain claimed that the episode "adds fuel to the fire of already negative perceptions of Muslims and fans the flames of British National Party rhetoric." Muslim Parliament of Great Britain's Ghayasuddin Siddiqui said "It is sad the BBC is doing this, [...] We are trying to condemn this kind of involvement in our community...to keep on making us look responsible for these crimes is just manipulation."

The producers and the BBC responded to the controversy by citing Muslim involvement towards the research and making of the episode, including Muslim sources, and depicting the Muslim characters who stood against the terrorists. The producers stated that the episode was not meant to offend anybody, and that it did not imply that all Muslims are terrorists, only that "some fanatics" can give "millions of good people a bad name."

=== Accolades and viewer polls ===
The second series was nominated for two awards, winning one of them. Paul Knight and Barney Pilling were nominated for a British Academy Television (BAFTA) Craft award for Editing in Fiction/Entertainment, but lost out to Mark Day for his work on the 2003 serial State of Play. However it won a Royal Television Society award for Best Drama Series, beating At Home with the Braithwaites and Teachers.

The second series was well received by viewers. The BBC released a "Best of" viewer polls at the end of 2003 on its website. Spooks was voted the best drama for the year. However, it was also voted tenth in the "Worst Drama" category. The series was also voted first for "Best Drama Website". Macfadyen was awarded fourth in the "Best Actor" category, while Hawes was voted the second best actress, beaten only by Julie Walters for her roles in The Canterbury Tales, in which Hawes also starred, and The Return. Macfadyen and Hawes were also listed in the "Most Desirable Star" category, having voted seventh and third, respectively. Tessa Phillips was voted 13th for "Best Villain". The second series cliffhanger was the public's second favourite moment in television, beaten only by the surprise return of "Dirty Den" Watts from the soap opera EastEnders.

== Home video release ==
The second series was first released on a DVD box set in the United Kingdom (Region 2) on 20 September 2004. It was later released in the United States (Region 1) on 11 January 2005, and in Australia (Region 4) on 21 March 2005. The box set consists of all 10 episodes of the second series over five discs in 16:9 widescreen format. The box set includes an array of special features. Five of the episodes contain audio commentary tracks, and all (with the exception of the second) include their own behind-the-scenes featurettes. In addition there are numerous other featurettes including many cast and crew members of the series, discussing various main characters and their cast members, resolving the cliffhanger from series one, and addressing the controversy the second episode attracted. An edited 50-minute showing of the first series finale that aired in the United States is also included. There were also deleted scenes, image galleries, trailers, series credits (Spooks is a programme that does not include credits in its episodes), and scripts of the episodes, the latter of which are found on DVD-ROM. In the United Kingdom, the box set was released with a "15" British Board of Film Classification (BBFC) certificate (meaning it is unsuitable for viewing by those under the age of 15 years).
