= Spooks series 1 =

1st series of the British television show Spooks

Spooks
- Season 1
- DVD cover art of Spooks series one
- No. of episodes: 6

Release
- Original network: BBC One
- Original release: 13 May – 17 June 2002

Season chronology
- Next → Series 2

The first series of the British spy drama television series Spooks (known as MI-5 in the United States) began broadcasting on 13 May 2002 on BBC One, and ended on 17 June 2002. It consists of six episodes. Spooks follows the actions of Section D, a counter-terrorism division of the British Security Service (MI5). Matthew Macfadyen, Keeley Hawes, David Oyelowo, Peter Firth, Jenny Agutter, Lisa Faulkner, Esther Hall, Heather Cave, Hugh Simon and Greame Mearns are listed as the main cast.

Kudos Film and Television developed Spooks after releasing Channel 4 medical drama Psychos in 1999, though the company initially faced friction from television networks, which saw no potential in a post-Cold War spy show. The producers later successfully pitched the series to the BBC after the network's commissioning teams were replaced. Four episodes were being written when the September 11 attacks took place, and the some scenes were rewritten to take the event into account to show the audience Spooks's goal of fighting terrorism. The producers were advised by former intelligence officers from the Security Service, KGB and Central Intelligence Agency. Filming took place from November 2001 to March 2002.

The first series was seen by an average of 7.49 million viewers, and received generally favourable reviews, with some critics comparing it to American espionage-based series such as 24. The second episode attracted controversy after a scene that depicted the brutal death of main character Helen Flynn (Lisa Faulkner) attracted more than 250 complaints. As a result of the series, MI5's website saw a surge in applications to join the organisation. The first series was awarded a British Academy Television Awards (BAFTA) for Best Drama Series, and was nominated for two other BAFTAs and three Royal Television Society Awards. The series was released on DVD on 16 June 2003 in Region 2, 18 August 2003 in Region 4, and 13 January 2004 in Region 1.

== Episodes ==
No. overall	No. in series	Title	Directed by	Written by	Original release date	UK viewers (millions)
1	1	"Thou Shalt Not Kill"	Bharat Nalluri	David Wolstencroft	13 May 2002	9.60
Section D of MI5 investigates a car bomb in Liverpool, that has killed family planning doctor Sarah Lynott (Karen Westwood). The agents determine that it is the work of an extremist pro-life movement, led by American terrorist Mary Kane (Lisa Eichhorn), who smuggled herself and 20 bombs into the country to set up cells. Zoe Reynolds (Keeley Hawes) poses as a sympathiser, and uncovers Kane's next intended target. Zoe then poses as the target, Diane Sullivan, and lures Kane to a trap, and she is arrested. After Kane informs team leader Tom Quinn (Matthew Macfadyen) of the location of every cell she set up in the United Kingdom, he sends her to the Central Intelligence Agency, which returns her to Florida to be executed. Meanwhile, Tom enters a relationship with a civilian, Ellie Simm (Esther Hall) after an unrelated operation, going under the pseudonym Matthew Archer, a civil servant.
2	2	"Looking After Our Own"	Bharat Nalluri	David Wolstencroft	20 May 2002	8.10
Tom and junior case officer Helen Flynn (Lisa Faulkner) are sent to expose right-wing leader Robert Osbourne (Kevin McNally), who is planning a race war in the UK. MI5 previously attempted to bug his home, only to find high-end security equipment. Tom and Helen pose as a married couple to befriend Claire, Osbourne's wife, who is being abused by him. MI5 believe that Osbourne intends to choke the asylum system, incite a race war, and have Member of Parliament Bill Watson raise the issue of asylum seekers. After they recruit Claire to help, Tom and Helen are kidnapped by Osbourne's gang to be interrogated. When Tom refuses to divulge any information, Osbourne forces Helen's hand, then head, into a deep fryer, before having her shot in the head. Claire then causes a distraction to allow Tom's escape, by throwing a cigarette into the fryer, igniting it. Although pressured by the government to continue tailing Osbourne, superior Harry Pearce (Peter Firth) has him assassinated as retribution for Helen's death.
3	3	"One Last Dance"	Rob Bailey	Simon Mirren	27 May 2002	7.30
Zoe is sent on a bugging operation at the Turkish consulate. Whilst there, the consulate is raided by Kurdish rebels, who hold everybody hostage and demand the release of their captured comrades. Tessa Phillips (Jenny Agutter) recognises Johnny Marks (Christopher Fulford), a former MI5 agent and lover of Tessa's, who was believed to have been killed in a car bomb in Northern Ireland several years before. It is revealed that Marks is handling the Kurdish rebels as a distraction, to break into a nearby bank to obtain the identities of every MI5 and MI6 agent. Tom is assigned to negotiate the hostage situation, while Danny Hunter (David Oyelowo) and a team arrive at the bank to engage Marks's men. MI5 fakes a news report detailing the "release" of the captured rebels. Tom is shot and wounded by a rebel, before CO19 armed police take back the consulate. Marks escapes and visits Tessa that evening. Marks learns Tessa was once pregnant with his child; after a change of heart, he only takes the stolen money, leaving behind the files with the agents' identities.
4	4	"Traitor's Gate"	Rob Bailey	Howard Brenton	4 June 2002	5.99
While observing an anti-globalisation rally in anticipation of the United States’s President George W. Bush's visit, Danny and Zoe recognise Peter Salter (Anthony Head), a legendary MI5 officer and Tom's recruiter. Salter is undercover as part of a joint MI5/6 operation to bring down an anarchist group led by Istvan Vogel (Jules Werner), which intends to attack Bush. However, Tom believes Salter may have defected to Vogel when it emerges that he is in love with one of the members, Andrea Chambers (Bronwen Davies). This is confirmed when Salter evades his superiors. He and Vogel break into a university campus to tamper with an Air Traffic Control system in an effort to bring down Bush's plane. After Salter is captured, he hangs himself before revealing what he did. However, Danny realises his intentions, and Bush's plane is redirected to Paris. Meanwhile, Zoe realises Tessa is running phantom agents for monetary gain, and is bribed £10,000 (equivalent to £18,500 in 2025) to keep quiet. Tom is forced to reveal to Ellie that he is a spy.
5	5	"The Rose Bed Memoirs"	Andy Wilson	Howard Brenton	10 June 2002	6.75
Disgraced MP and born-again Christian Hampton Wilder (Tim Pigott-Smith) is released from prison after a sentence for embezzlement. He reveals to Harry that he wrote memoirs, which implicate fellow MP Richard Maynard (Nicholas Farrell) and himself of performing illegal arms deals. However the memoirs have been stolen. Through the investigation behind Maynard, it is revealed that MI6 stole the memoirs; Jools Siviter (Hugh Laurie) hands them over, but as MI5 review them, they find nothing significant. Maynard suddenly resigns to teach at Harvard University, as Jools reveals to Harry that Maynard is a CIA asset. Meanwhile, Tom's relationship with Ellie is strained when her daughter Maisie's (Heather Cave) father returns. When the father digs into Tom's professional life, he is confronted by MI5 officers. Zoe is struggling to deal with Tessa's corruption, and Danny attempts to convince her to tell Harry.
6	6	"Lesser of Two Evils" "Mean, Dirty, Nasty"	Andy Wilson	David Wolstencroft & Howard Brenton	17 June 2002	7.21
Tom upgrades the security systems in his home to keep Ellie and Maisie safe. Meanwhile, the head of an Irish splinter group, Patrick McCann (Lorcan Cranitch), demands to see an MI5 officer. When Tom sees him, McCann reveals that a Sudanese terrorist group called Asabiyah will attack the Sefton B nuclear power station, but McCann will only disclose the details if his group goes unwatched for 30 hours. Harry vetoes McCann's proposal; however, Tom, believing the threat is credible, asks the Director General of MI5 to override Harry. McCann's group takes the opportunity to plant a bomb at Broad Street Station. MI5 is able to prevent any casualties in the attack and fool McCann, and he gives Tom details of the attack via a laptop; special forces are able to kill two Asabiyah terrorists before they can fire a rocket at Sefton B. Zoe finally reveals Tessa's corruption to Harry, who fires Tessa. McCann calls Tom to reveal that his group rigged the laptop with C4 explosive with the hopes of disabling MI5. However, Tom has stored the laptop in his home. The security measures at his home malfunction, and the series ends with Ellie and Maisie trapped in the home, and Tom outside helpless to save them.

== Cast ==
The cast for series one (from left to right): Keeley Hawes as Zoe Reynolds, Matthew Macfadyen as Tom Quinn, Jenny Agutter as Tessa Philips, Peter Firth as Harry Pearce, David Oyelowo as Danny Hunter, Lisa Faulkner as Helen Flynn.

Ten main cast members are listed in the first series. Matthew Macfadyen plays primary protagonist and senior case officer Tom Quinn. Creator David Wolstencroft found Tom to be the most fun, yet hardest character to write for due to him being the main character. When portraying the character, Macfadyen did what he was told to do; he did not want to create a backstory for the character as he did not find merit in doing so. Keeley Hawes plays junior case officer Zoe Reynolds. Hawes was attracted to the parallels between acting and spying. The actress described Zoe as "a feisty little number. She can be quite cold and you don't really know her," and the series sees "flashes of how she can be". David Oyelowo plays fellow junior case officer Danny Hunter. Oyelowo first became aware of the show when his agent brought him the script, and was quickly intrigued by the project, and wanted a part to play in it. He downplayed his enthusiasm to get the part. Macfadyen, Hawes and Oyelowo were initially wary of playing the lead characters even though the actors were in their mid-twenties, but eventually felt that they earned the right to be in the series.

Peter Firth plays the head of the counter-terrorism department, Harry Pearce. Firth was interested in the series after hearing of Brenton's involvement in the project, and thought Spooks was "special" and "different" from British television at the time. Firth would "pepper" the dialogue with quotations from famous classical works, with moral and religious philosophies. Jenny Agutter plays Tessa Philips, senior case officer for Section K. The actress described Tessa as "hard edged" and "not a nice person", but straightforward and not initially expected to be corrupt. She realised that although Tessa would start off as a peripheral character, her role would build as the series continued. Tessa's story was described by a BBC press release as being about "the dangers of corruption from within". Lisa Faulkner portrays admin support officer Helen Flynn. Esther Hall plays Tom's girlfriend and restaurant owner Ellie Simm, while Heather Cave plays her eight-year-old daughter, Maisie. Hall felt that Ellie was the character the audience could identify with. The producers created Maisie because they believed that children are often "the best spies of all". Hugh Simon plays technical officer Malcolm Wynn-Jones, and Greame Mearns plays MI5 officer Jed Kelley.

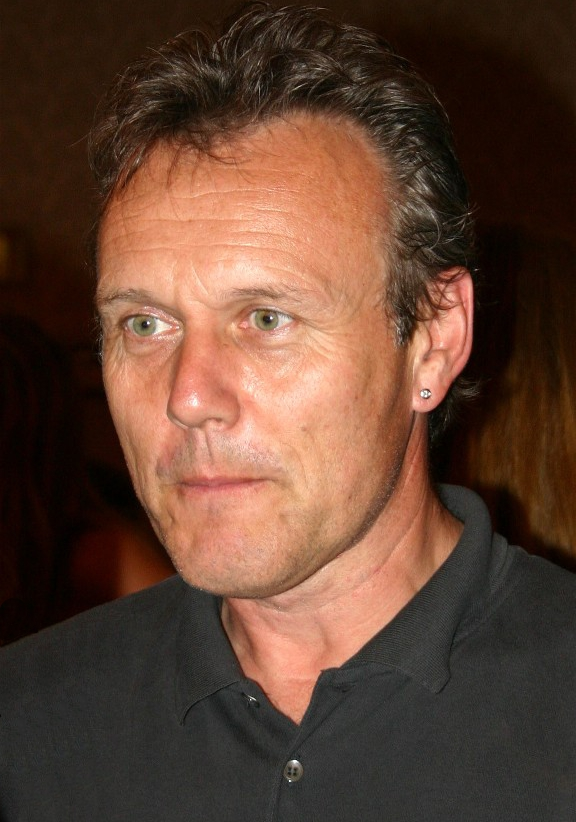
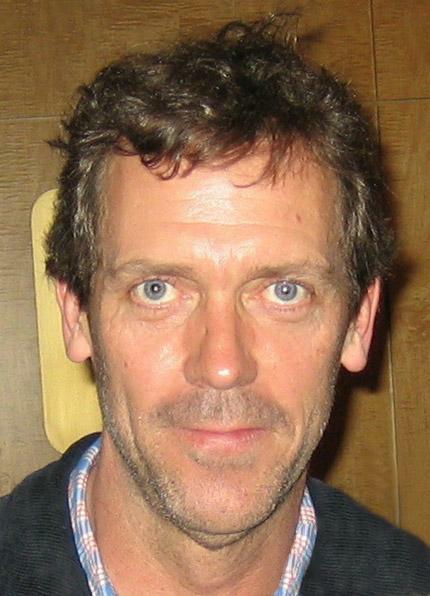
Guest appearances in the first series include Anthony Head (left) and Hugh Laurie.

The first series also sees a number of recurring characters and guest appearances. Rory MacGregor appears in two episodes as Colin Wells, an MI5 technical officer. American actress Megan Dodds appears in the first episode as CIA liaison Christine Dale. The producers were impressed enough by Dodds' performance that they wished to see her return in the second series. Kevin McNally appears as Robert Osbourne, the antagonist of the second episode. The producers felt the actor was suitable for the role, as was the case with Debra Stephenson, who played his wife Claire. In the fourth and fifth episodes, Hugh Laurie appears as Jools Siviter, a department head of MI6, an organisation depicted as "old school" compared with MI5. Laurie based his performance on Barry Foster's portrayal of the head of MI6 in Sweeney!. Meanwhile, also in episode four, Anthony Head, best known for his work on Buffy the Vampire Slayer at the time, played Peter Salter. Despite his status as a former Buffy regular, Head still had to earn the role from his audition.

In episode five, Tim Pigott-Smith plays Hampton Wilder, a character who was based on Richard Nixon and Jeffrey Archer. In the same episode, Naoko Mori appeared as a lover of Danny's; Mori previously appeared in Psychos, another series produced by Kudos. In the finale, Irish actor Lorcan Cranitch plays Irish splinter group terrorist Patrick McCann. Cranitch had previously appeared in several other dramas as Provisional Irish Republican Army (IRA) operators.

== Production ==
=== Crew ===
The first series of Spooks was produced by Kudos Film and Television for the BBC. David Wolstencroft was credited as creator, Simon Crawford Collins as the producer, and Jane Featherstone as the series producer. The executive producers of the first series were Kudos director Stephen Garrett and Head of Independent Drama Commissioning for the BBC, Gareth Neame. The series includes three screenwriters, and three directors. Wolstencroft wrote the first two episodes and finale of series one. Simon Mirren wrote the third episode. Howard Brenton wrote the last three episodes, co-writing the finale with Wolstencroft. The producers hired Brenton for his "radical" and "provocative" style. By the time he was hired it had been sixteen years since he last wrote for television.

The producers from Kudos spent up to three months meeting several potential directors to work on the show, but none shared their views about the show's style until Bharat Nalluri. The style the director used was inspired by Bollywood films, as well as American television. According to Wolstencroft, Nalluri "directs as I see." Three directors were chosen, each working on two episodes; Nalluri directed the first two episodes, Rob Bailey directed the next two episodes, and Andy Wilson directed the last two episodes. Sue Gibson and Sean Bobbitt served as the directors of photography, with Mark Goddard and Francesco Reidy serving as first assistant directors. Colin Green and Soren B. Ebbe were the series editors, while David Crozier and Andrew Sissions served as sound recordists. Leila Kirkpatrick was the line producer and Linda Stefansdottir was the production designer, while Andrea Galer was the costume designer, and Alison Davies was the make-up designer. The casting director for the first series was Gail Stevens. Karen Wilson was the script editor, and Ralph Cameron and Malcolm Treen were the location managers.

=== Conception ===
Kudos began to develop the show after producing the Channel 4 medical drama series Psychos in 1999. Kudos wished to explore series ideas that saw beyond typical "precinct-based dramas" (crime and medical). Stephen Garrett decided on developing a spy drama after coming across John le Carré novels at a Waterstone's bookstore, and came to realise that MI5 or MI6 had not been featured as the setting for shows before. He felt the benefit of a spy show is that rather than in a crime drama where the protagonists take their work home with them, spies are given the added dimension that they cannot reveal their work even to their loved ones. In the meantime, Wolstencroft, who wrote Psychos, was also developing a spy drama, albeit as a film. When Kudos contacted him, they agreed they should work together to create a television series based on his idea, which was not to glamourise the world of spies, instead showing the audience that spies work in a "shitty job". Kudos later pitched the show to all the major British television networks; however none of them were as enthusiastic as Kudos, as they did not see the potential of a post-Cold War spy series. After the commissioning teams from the networks were replaced, Kudos again pitched the show, albeit reinvented, and as a result Lorraine Heggessey, controller of BBC One, commissioned the show after planning to introduce "braver", "dynamic" and "pacier" shows to attract a younger audience for the channel.

=== Writing ===
The two main writers, Brenton and Wolstencroft, had different styles and influences in their scripts. Wolstencroft was influenced by American television to make the episodes pacier. His chosen writing style was a mixture of the "grittyness" of le Carré's works and James Bond-like fantasies. While writing the series, the writer introduced a set of "MI5 terminology", terms used by the main characters in the series. According to Oyelowo, Wolstencroft's scripts included more spy terms, stating "we curse David Wolstencroft often. His dialogue tends to be the most chewy," and the actors had to learn them as if they spoke as such on a daily basis. Brenton, meanwhile, adopted the same writing style based on early episodes of Taggart, a Scottish-based crime drama; the writer was impressed by the show's ability to add more to the plot halfway through. He also took inspirations from novels including le Carré's Tinker, Tailor, Soldier, Spy. Mirren wrote "One Last Dance", which he felt was difficult to write as he had to tie two main storylines together. Brenton and Wolstencroft collaborated to write "Lesser of Two Evils" due to timing constraints. Wolstencroft pitched the story, and then each writer wrote 30 pages of dialogue.

The pilot originally underwent thirty rewrites and four separate story ideas before the BBC was satisfied. Similarly, the second episode went through four rewrites. After four episodes were written, the September 11 attacks took place, resulting in three thousand deaths in the United States. As a result, the episodes were rewritten to take account of the events to assure the audience that the show is about fighting terrorism. According to Wolstencroft, the attacks "sidewinded" the show, "perversely made it as relevant as can be", and "commuted a great sense of responsibility" on Spooks.

Throughout both the writing and filming, the writers were advised by ex-MI5 officers who gave insight into how the characters operate and how their personal lives would be affected. Among them were Nick Day, who worked in counter-terrorism in the Security Services, Viktor Abramkin, a UK-based former KGB officer, and Mike Baker, an ex-CIA agent. When including terrorists, the BBC often has the responsibility to portray people with as much balance as possible for both sides. The first series's finale was heavily researched, as the episode was based on real life instances in which terrorists had agreed to work with the authorities in Colombia. Meanwhile, a scene in which Tom and Patrick strip naked to ensure they are not bugged came from the producers' sources, who also advised the producers how to tail targets without being spotted.

"Imagine moving in with the man you love and then discover you don't even know his real name? It's the ultimate betrayal. Suddenly you're in a relationship with a complete stranger. You discover your partner has always been acting in some way, that he's always been at an emotional distance. If someone's lied that much, how can there ever be any trust in your relationship again?"

— Esther Hall describing the Tom/Ellie relationship from Ellie's point of view.

The second episode included the death of a main character. This was originally going to be used in the series finale. However, the producers did not know how to fill in episode two, so the death was moved up. According to Wolstencroft, the inclusion of Helen's death was to give the audience the message that "the world of Spooks isn't the world where the cavalry always arrive, because in reality these people [MI5] do risk their lives on our behalf and they do get into sticky situations with genuinely nasty people". The producers wanted main characters to die on occasion rather than on a weekly or bi-weekly basis; otherwise it would show MI5 officers as not doing their jobs properly. Although Spooks is a serious show, the writers add occasional humour from the characters. According to Wolstencroft, he felt that anybody who works in such an occupation with high responsibilities tends to have humour around, and that those people make jokes even though they have seen "heinous things". This became the basis for creating Jools Siviter.

Among the storylines of the series were Danny's obsession with money and spending, by hacking into a credit card database to fool it to give him a better credit rating, and the discovery that Tessa is running phantom agents to pocket their money. These were intended by Brenton and Wolstencroft to show the audience that the MI5 officers are tempted by money. A principle story arc is Tom dealing with the complexities of his relationship with Ellie, who at first does not know he is a spy. This storyline was based on Mike Baker, whose wife did not know he was a spy for the first six months they were together. As the series progressed, there were more difficulties with the relationship; Brenton wrote Tom's position as if the character did not see the problem. The same episode also introduced the sexual tension between Danny and Zoe.

=== Filming ===
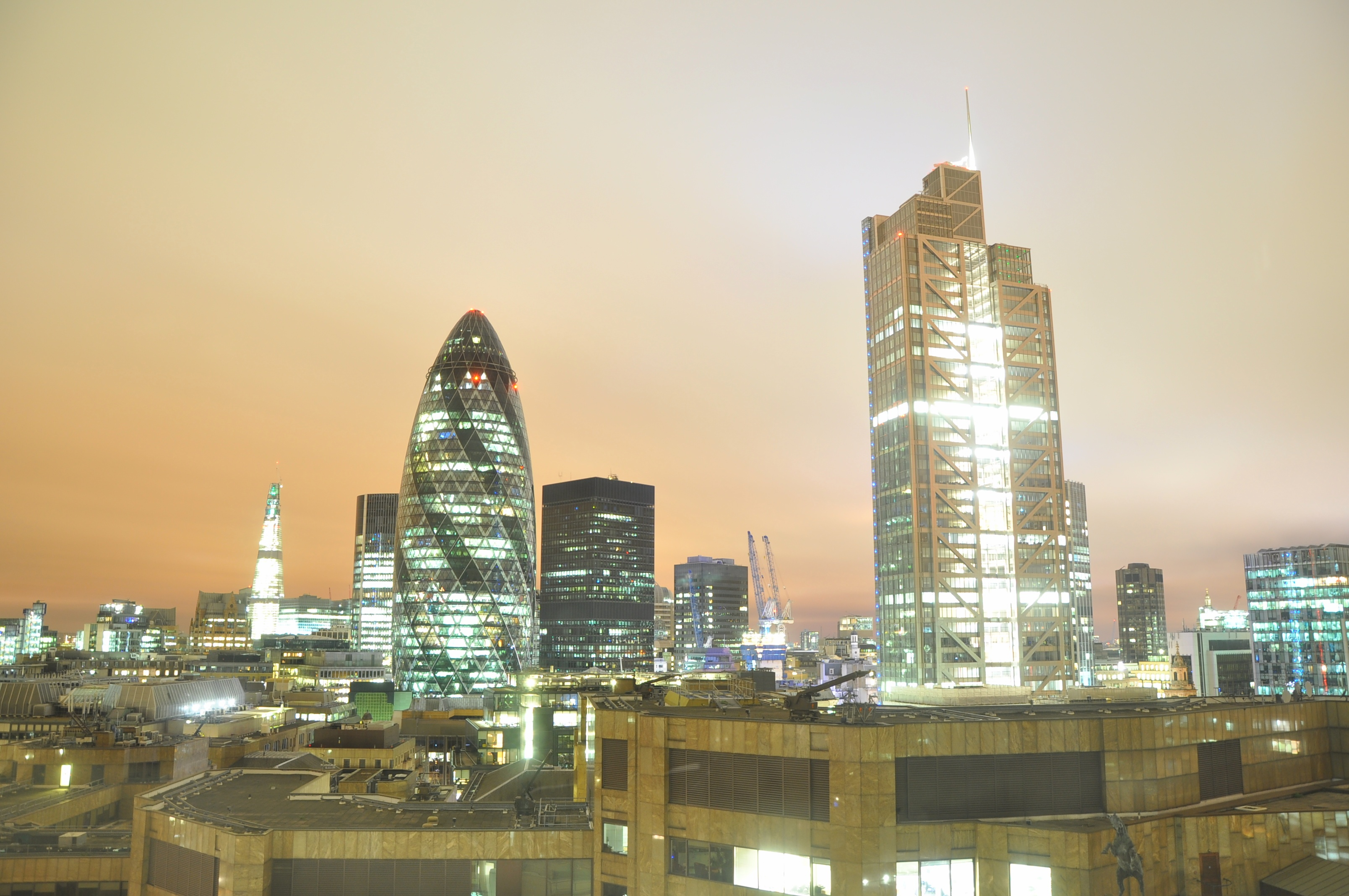
Filming took place in London, Britain's capital city and Spooks' general setting.

The first series began filming in November 2001, and continued until March 2002. Shooting took place mostly in London, with many rural scenes filmed around South East England. Each episode took approximately 12 to 14 days to shoot, although they do not follow on the order of the script; the production crew would film all scenes set at a certain location first, and then move on to the rest. Between 40 and 50 cuts were made in the first 10 minutes of the pilot episode to quickly introduce the main characters. Filming was usually done with long lens cameras, which proved difficult for the crew as many filming location were short on space. The scenes where Tom reveals he is a spy to Ellie in "Traitor's Gate" were filmed using hand-held cameras, the first time they were used in the series. By the time the crew filmed the series finale, hand-held cameras were mostly used. The cameras allowed for more intimate filming as opposed to shoulder-operated cameras. The downside to the hand-held cameras was that they can only shoot four minutes worth of footage from each film stock. In addition, the operators at first hated using the cameras.

The episodes of the first series were not filmed in the order they were broadcast; "Traitor's Gate" was the third episode to be filmed, while "One Last Dance" was the fourth. While filming "One Last Dance" and "The Rose Bed Memoirs", Macfadyen had a bloodshot left eye. To cover it, sometimes Macfadyen had to hide the left side of his face from the camera. At other times, the actor wore sunglasses. The series made use of real firearms that were decommissioned from service. Certain cast members, including Oyelowo, handled firearms; to maintain gun safety, two weapons experts were on hand to train the actors.

The producers chose the exterior and some interior of Freemasons' Hall in Holborn as the stand-in for Thames House, the real-life headquarters of MI5, as they felt both buildings shared a similar architecture. However the Grid set, the offices of the protagonists, was filmed in a closed medical school in Kensington. Sometime after filming concluded for the first series, the building was demolished. Several other locations around London were used. The scenes leading up to Mary's apprehension in "Thou Shalt Not Kill" were filmed at Borough Market in Southwark. The same episode made use of Covent Garden. "One Last Dance" had scenes filmed in Roehampton and New Zealand House. In the latter case, the actors were filmed on the top floors, where the wind forced them to raise their voices so the sound unit could hear. Scenes were filmed in Hampstead Heath at "Traitor's Gate", while one scene was filmed in Trafalgar Square and at London Bridge for "The Rose Bed Memoirs". The last two episodes had several scenes filmed at a high-end house in Highgate owned by a silk merchant, in particular the opera house and bar Jools frequents, and the DG's (Director General of MI5) office. Rural scenes were filmed across South East England, including in Surrey, and outside Maidstone in Kent. In the finale, the exterior of Sizewell nuclear power stations in Suffolk was used as a double for the fictional Sefton B power station.

=== Post-production ===
Each episode took approximately two months to edit, and editing usually began while the episodes were still being shot. The editors would work on two episodes simultaneously. Following completion, Muskett added the score. The episodes include split screen sequences. Although these were presented in a similar vein to the American series 24, the split screen idea did not come from that show; Nalluri thought of it independently, after visiting a pub one night after filming. The series also introduced the premise of not including any production credits, which the producers saw as a waste of time, with viewers paying no attention to them. However, they also saw this as an opportunity: as Spooks is a spy show, Wolstencroft thought it would be "cool" to have a show that was anonymous, which would fit the spirit of the series.

== Broadcast and reception ==
=== Broadcast, ratings and impact ===
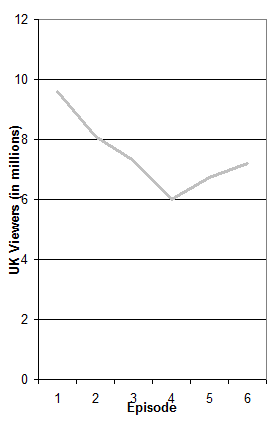
Final ratings for the first series

The BBC initially considered airing the show on a Saturday night, as its research found that potential viewers were less likely to watch television on Saturdays; the BBC hoped that Spooks would boost that timeslot. However, the series instead broadcast on Mondays, beginning on 13 May 2002 on BBC One during the 9 to 10 pm timeslot, and continued every Monday night until 17 June, with the exception of the fourth episode, which was viewed on Tuesday 4 June starting at 10 pm, due to an overrun of the coverage of Elizabeth II's Golden Jubilee. The episodes were also repeated on the digital channel BBC Choice. In the US, the first series aired in mid-2003 on A&E. However, each episode had approximately ten minutes edited out to accommodate for advert breaks. The DVD release of the series in America contained the British, uncut, episodes. The first series was later repeated on BBC America, alongside the second series from June 2007.

The Spooks producers were hoping the ratings for the pilot would achieve at least six million viewers; at the time this was considered acceptable by the BBC, as it would allow them to further consider Spooks' future. The first episode ended up with an overnight rating of 9.2 million viewers, with a 41 per cent audience share, easily winning its time slot, and nearly double the numbers of ITV1's Helen West in the same slot. The second episode dropped to 7.8 million, but was still the most viewed series in the timeslot. Although the series won its timeslot again in the third episode, "One Last Dance" faced competition from The Kumars at No. 42 on BBC Two, and dropped to seven million. The different timeslot for episode four meant that it dipped below six million; however, ratings recovered to over seven million by the finale. With consolidated figures factored in, the first series was seen by an average of 7.49 million viewers. (Note: See the ratings on the episode table above. Look up the top 30 weekly programmes from weeks ending 19 May to 24 June 2002 from the Broadcasters' Audience Research Board website.) After two episodes aired, the BBC began considering renewing the show for a longer second series as it had proved popular among the key demographics of viewers aged 16 to 34. The renewal was officially announced by the BBC's Head of Drama Commissioning Jane Tranter in December 2002.

Within the fortnight of launch, MI5 noted a surge in a number of applications to the organisation. Out of the 10,000-plus applications per week to MI5's website, more than 2,500 people applied following the end of a Spooks episode, while before the episodes broadcast, only a handful of new applications were received. MI5 welcomed the show's impact, despite its officers' views that Spooks was "unrealistic and far-fetched", and could give viewers a false impression of how the organisation operates.

=== Critical reception ===
"This new series looks like it's going to be great fun, but it's presumably not meant to be taken too seriously, because surely life in MI5 can't be this exciting? Of if it were, we'd all be queueing up to talk in clipped and meaningful tones while striding down official-looking corridors."

— Alison Graham of the Radio Times

The first series received generally favourable reviews. Joe Joseph of The Times stated that it "bears a closer resemblance [to] 24", which "shaded the pleasure of this opening episode", but felt that by the end of the episode, Spooks had "established a voice of its own". Gerard O'Donovan of The Telegraph thought that the series "proved thoroughly entertaining", and praised Wolstencroft's writing, which O'Donovan felt was "confident enough to be playful with its subject – especially regarding Britain's poor-relation relationship with America". Alison Graham of the Radio Times called the first series "a tremendous pieces of hokum, which is only slightly po-faced (but in a knowing kind of way) and which manages to stay just on the right side of self-parody". Thomas Sudcliff of The Independent felt it was a "different kind of spy drama" with "a literal description, derived from the sort of rueful story you could imagine being told at an MI5 staff social", and "a lot of bullshit too, naturally. This is one of those dramas where colleagues never make small talk but instead launch straight into an urgent purposive shorthand."

Nancy Banks-Smith of The Guardian stated that it was "one of those shiny and insubstantial series", adding that "all that leaping out of bed at dawn on the pretext that you have to go and sell a house tends to wear thin". Banks-Smith also called the story "slightly unexpected" and stated, "Spooks appears to plume itself on its authenticity, and there are moments, well one moment, so stupid it has to be true." Fellow Guardian reviewer Gareth McLean stated that Spooks is "so good it makes you want to be a spy." Dennis Landmann of MovieFreak rated the series eight out of ten, calling it "thrilling, dramatic, and fast", while "much more concise" than many American series. Landmann added, "Each story is complex and convincing, plus the scripts are very well written. A lot goes on in each episode, and it's detrimental for a show like this to keep the action and tension going as fast as possible." The reviewer also noted that having only six episodes worked as an advantage over American television, stating "while this seems incredibly short, the idea is actually very good. This ensures that each episode is strong in content and execution. American shows tend to run for 20–25 episodes a season, and while developments occur, there are always the filler episodes. With [Spooks] there is nothing like it, no filler material at all. In fact, the first season sees a lot of development."

Matthew Millheiser of DVD Talk agreed. Millheiser called it a "great show," with "plotlines that are fast-paced and gripping throughout", adding, "It lacks the slick, candy-coated escapism and romanticism of Alias, or the white-knuckled, thrill-a-minute intensity of 24. [Spooks] is its own beast altogether: a smart, thrilling series that pulls no punches and maintains a consistent level of quality and intelligence throughout its running time." Bryan Byun of DVD Verdict had an issue with the storylines, stating, "At times it takes the entire length of an episode to figure out precisely what's going on. While that frenetic pace makes for challenging viewing, it might prevent the show from reaching a broader audience." However, Byun thought the first series was a "solid, gripping entertainment that pulls few punches. While it's a little talkier and more reliant on suspense and mystery than trigger-happy American action shows, [Spooks] should please any fan of cloak-and-dagger antics." Michael Mackenzie of The Digital Fix rated the series eight out of ten, stating that although Spooks "may not be perfect", "it is an imaginative and intriguing series".

=== Helen Flynn controversy ===
The first series attracted controversy for its second episode, which saw the demise of a main character after her hand and head were forced into a deep fryer. The scene attracted more than 250 complaints, 154 of them to the television watchdog, the Broadcasting Standards Commission, the highest number of complaints for a television programme in 2002. Following the complaints, the BBC admitted that the scene "clearly disturbed" several viewers, but defended it as it was showing the audience "the kind of threat which might be faced by agents engaged in the fight against terrorism". The Broadcasting Standards Commission stated the scene was shocking, but "in the context was acceptable and important for the later narrative". However the watchdog still criticised the BBC for failing to warn viewers of the violence to come. The controversy sparked a response from comedian Charlie Brooker in his Guardian column, stating: "The moment her head was forced into the deep-fat-fryer, viewers reared on the formulaic, it'll-be-alright-in-the-end blandness of cookie-cutter populist dramas like Casualty and Merseybeat sat up and blinked in disbelief: here was a major BBC drama series that actually had the nerve to confound expectation."

=== Accolades and viewer polls ===
The series was nominated for six awards, one of which it won. It was nominated for three British Academy Television Awards (BAFTA) awards, two of which were Craft nominations, and won the Best Drama Series category over Clocking Off, Cutting It and Teachers. Colin Green was nominated for his editing, and Jennie Muskett for Original Television Music in the Craft awards, but they lost to Daniel Deronda and The Forsyte Saga respectively. The series was also nominated for three Royal Television Society Awards, including Drama Series, although it lost out to Clocking Off. Howard Brenton and David Wolstencroft were nominated for the Writer award, but lost to Peter Bowker's work on television film Flesh and Blood. In the Craft awards, Julian Slater, Nigel Heath, Michael Fentum and Dan Morgan were nominated for Best Sound in Drama.

The series was well received by fans. At the end of 2002, the BBC released a "Best of" viewer polls on its website. Spooks was voted the third best drama, beaten only by lesbian period drama Tipping the Velvet, which starred Keeley Hawes, and American action series 24. However, Spooks was also voted the third worst drama. Firth and Macfadyen were listed in the "Best Actor" category, being voted twenty-first, and fifth, respectively. Macfadyen was also voted the sixth "hunkiest male". Meanwhile, in the "Best Actress" category, Agutter and Hawes were voted twenty-sixth and second, respectively. Agutter, Faulkner and Hawes were also respectively voted the thirtieth, sixteenth and second "most fanciable females". The Tom and Ellie relationship was seen by viewers as the fourth best couple in television for the year, and Patrick McCann as the sixth best villain. The closing scenes of the series finale were voted the second "Favourite Moment", behind the reveal of Nina Myers as a mole in 24.

== Home video release ==
The series was first released on DVD in the United Kingdom (Region 2) by the Contender Entertainment Group on 16 June 2003. It was later released in Australia (Region 4) by Universal Pictures on 18 August 2003, and in the United States (Region 1, where it is known as MI-5: Volume 1) by BBC Video/Warner Home Video on 13 January 2004. The box set consists of all six episodes of the first series over three discs and 1.78:1 Anamorphic PAL widescreen format. The box set includes an array of special features. Each episode has its own audio commentary. In addition there are interviews with the cast and crew members, discussing the origins and development of the show and the purpose of the main characters. There are also deleted scenes, image galleries, an explained list of MI5 terms, series credits (Spooks is a programme that has no credits), and scripts, the latter found on DVD-ROM. In the United Kingdom, the box set was released with a "15" British Board of Film Classification (BBFC) certificate (meaning it is unsuitable for viewing by those under the age of 15).
