= List of Spooks characters =

This is a list of characters in the television series Spooks (known as MI-5 in some countries), a British television spy drama series. It originally aired its first run on BBC One, for 10 series, from 13 May 2002 to 23 October 2011.

Character	Actor	Series									
Character	Actor	1	2	3	4	5	6	7	8	9	10
Sir Harry Pearce KBE	Peter Firth	Main	Main	Main	Main	Main	Main	Main	Main	Main	Main
Malcolm Wynn-Jones	Hugh Simon	Main (Note: Hugh Simon only appeared in the first episode of Series 8.)	Main	Main	Main	Main	Main	Main	Main	Guest	
Tom Quinn	Matthew Macfadyen	Main (Note: Matthew Macfadyen only appeared in the first two episodes of Series 3.)	Main	Main							Guest
Zoe Reynolds	Keeley Hawes	Main (Note: Keeley Hawes only appeared in the first six episodes of Series 3.)	Main	Main							
Danny Hunter	David Oyelowo	Main	Main	Main							
Tessa Phillips	Jenny Agutter	Main	Guest								
Ellie Simm	Esther Hall	Main	Guest								
Maisie Simm	Heather Cave	Main	Guest								
Jed Kelley	Graeme Mearns	Main									
Helen Flynn	Lisa Faulkner	Main (Note: Despite being credited as part of the main cast in Series 1, Lisa Faulkner's character is very notably killed in the second overall episode, "Looking After Our Own", and does not appear again.)									
Colin Wells	Rory MacGregor	Recurring	Main (Note: Rory MacGregor only appeared in the first episode of Series 5.)	Main	Main	Main					
Ruth Evershed	Nicola Walker		Main (Note: Nicola Walker only appeared in the first five episodes of Series 5.)	Main	Main	Main			Main	Main	Main
Sam Buxton	Shauna Macdonald		Main	Main							
Adam Carter	Rupert Penry-Jones			Main (Note: Rupert Penry-Jones only appeared in the first episode of Series 7.)	Main	Main	Main	Main			
Fiona Carter	Olga Sosnovska			Recurring	Main (Note: Olga Sosnovska left in episode 7 of Series 4.)						
Zafar Younis	Raza Jaffrey			Guest	Main (Note: Raza Jaffrey only appeared in the first episode of Series 6.)	Main	Main				
Jo Portman	Miranda Raison				Main (Note: Miranda Raison only appeared in the first three episodes of Series 8.)	Main	Main	Main	Main		
Ros Myers	Hermione Norris					Main (Note: Hermione Norris only appeared in the first eight episodes of Series 6 before returning in Series 7.)	Main	Main	Main		
Connie James	Gemma Jones						Main	Main			
Ben Kaplan DSO	Alex Lanipekun						Main (Note: Alex Lanipekun did not join until the fifth episode of Series 6.)	Main			
Lucas North / John Bateman	Richard Armitage							Main	Main	Main	
Tariq Masood	Shazad Latif								Main (Note: Shazad Latif only appeared in the first two episodes of Series 10.)	Main	Main
Dimitri Levendis	Max Brown									Main	Main
Beth Bailey	Sophia Myles									Main	
Erin Watts	Lara Pulver										Main
Calum Reed	Geoffrey Streatfeild										Main

== Final series leads ==
Main characters for Series 10:

- Sir Harry Pearce KBE (Peter Firth) (2002–2011) – Head of Counter-Terrorism Department, MI5
- Dimitri Levendis (Max Brown) (2010–2011) – Piracy & Terrorism Case Officer Section D
- Erin Watts (Lara Pulver) (2011) – Chief of Section & Senior Case Officer, Section D
- Calum Reed (Geoffrey Streatfeild) (2011) – Junior Case Officer, Section D
- William Towers (Simon Russell Beale) (2010–2011) – Home Secretary
- Ruth Evershed (Nicola Walker) (2003–2006, 2009–2011) – Section D Intelligence Analyst, Home Secretary's Assistant (two episodes), originally seconded to MI5 from GCHQ

== Former characters ==
=== MI5 staff ===
- Tariq Masood (Shazad Latif) (2009–2011) – Technician & Data Analyst, Section D
- Beth Bailey (Sophia Myles) (2010) – Junior Case Officer, Section D
- Lucas North (Richard Armitage) (2008–2010) – Chief of Section & Senior Case Officer, Section D
- Ros Myers (Hermione Norris) (2006–2009) – Chief of Section & Senior Case Officer, Section D; formerly Senior Case Officer at MI5 and MI6
- Jo Portman (Miranda Raison) (2005–2009) – Junior Case Officer, Section D
- Malcolm Wynn-Jones (Hugh Simon) (2002–2009, 2010) – Technician & Data Analyst, Section D
- Adam Carter (Rupert Penry-Jones) (2004–2008) – Chief of Section & Senior Case Officer, Section D; formerly Senior Case Officer at MI6
- Connie James (Gemma Jones) (2007–2008) – Senior Analyst, Section D
- Ben Kaplan DSO (Alex Lanipekun) (2007–2008) – Junior Case Officer, Section D
- Zafar Younis (Raza Jaffrey) (2004–2007) – Junior Case Officer, Section D
- Colin Wells (Rory MacGregor) (2002–2006) – Technician & Data Analyst, Section D
- Sam Buxton (Shauna Macdonald) (2003–2005) – Administrative Officer, Section D
- Fiona Carter (Olga Sosnovska) (2004–2005) – Seconded MI6 Officer, Section D
- Zoe Reynolds (Keeley Hawes) (2002–2004) – Junior Case Officer, Section D
- Tom Quinn (Matthew Macfadyen) (2002–2004) – Chief of Section & Senior Case Officer, Section D
- Danny Hunter (David Oyelowo) (2002–2004) – Junior Case Officer, Section D
- Tessa Phillips (Jenny Agutter) (2002–2003) – Chief of Section & Senior Case Officer, Section K
- Jed Kelley (Graeme Mearns) (2002) – Administrative Officer, Section D
- Helen Flynn (Lisa Faulkner) (2002) – Junior Case Officer, Section D

=== Other officers ===
- Vaughn Edwards (Iain Glen) (2010) – Deniable intelligence operative who seemed to work for the highest bidder
- Sarah Caulfield (Genevieve O'Reilly) (2009) – CIA agent
- Viktor Sarkisian (Peter Sullivan) (2008–2009) – Head of the FSB's London office
- Bob Hogan (Matthew Marsh) (2007) – Senior CIA liaison
- Oliver Mace (Tim McInnerny) (2004, 2006) – Chairman of the Joint Intelligence Committee, later Director-General of MI5
- Juliet Shaw (Anna Chancellor) (2005–) – National Security Co-ordinator; status uncertain following end of Series 6
- Christine Dale (Megan Dodds) (2002–2004) – CIA agent
- Jools Siviter (Hugh Laurie) (2002) – MI6 Section Chief

=== Significant others ===
- Maya Lahan (Laila Rouass) (2010) – Lucas's ex-girlfriend
- Elizabeta Starkova (Paloma Baeza) (2008) – Lucas's ex-wife
- Ana Bakshi (Agni Scott) (2007) - Iranian diplomat's wife, Adam's lover
- Will North (Richard Harrington) (2004) – Zoe Reynolds' fiancé
- Ellie Simm (Esther Hall) (Main cast Series 1, 2002–2003) – Tom's ex-girlfriend
- Maisie Simm (Heather Cave) (Main cast Series 1, 2002–2003) – Ellie's young daughter
- Vicki Westbrook (Natasha Little) (2003) – Tom's ex-girlfriend
- Carlo Franceschini (Enzo Cilenti) (2003) – Zoe's ex-boyfriend

== UK Ministers ==
These fictional UK cabinet ministers managed the team or have been characters in some episodes.

- Nicholas Blake – Home Secretary – (Robert Glenister) (2006–2009); killed 2010
- Rachel Beauchamp – Foreign Secretary – (Jill Baker) (Series 7, Episode 6)
- Gillian Calderwood – Chancellor of the Exchequer – (Selina Cadell) (Series 7, Episode 5)
- Caroline Fox – Deputy Prime Minister – (Cheryl Campbell) (Series 5, Episode 10)
- James Allan – Foreign Secretary – (Alex Jennings) (2006)
- Ruth Chambers – Foreign Secretary – (Angela Bruce) (2007)
- unnamed Home Secretary – (Jeff Rawle) (2005)
- Alan Taylor – Cabinet Secretary – (2006)
- Richard Maynard – Defence Secretary – mentioned but resigned later
- Daniel Wise – Foreign Trade Minister – (Ian Bartholomew) (2006)
- Andrew Lawrence – Home Secretary – (Tobias Menzies) (2009)
- William Towers – Home Secretary – (Simon Russell Beale) (2010–2011)

== Other guest stars ==
=== Series 1 ===
- Anthony Head – Traitor's Gate (1#4)
- Tim Pigott-Smith – (1#5)

=== Series 2 ===
- Alexander Siddig – Series 2, Episode 2
- Roshan Seth – Series 2, Episode 2

=== Series 3 ===
- Anton Lesser – Series 3, Episode 4
- Andy Serkis – Series 3, Episode 8

=== Series 4 ===
- Martine McCutcheon – Series 4, Episode 2
- Andrew Tiernan – Surreal World and The Possibility of a Mole (4#1 and 4#2)
- Jimi Mistry – Series 4, Episode 6

=== Series 5 ===
- Gugu Mbatha-Raw as Jenny

=== Series 7 ===
- Paul Rhys as Alexis Meynell – Episode 5
