= Spooks series 4 =

4th series of the British television show Spooks

Spooks
- Season 4
- No. of episodes: 10

Release
- Original network: BBC One
- Original release: 12 September – 10 November 2005

Series chronology
- ← Previous; Series 3 Next → Series 5

The fourth series of the BBC espionage television series Spooks began broadcasting on 12 September 2005 before ending on 10 November 2005. The series consists of ten episodes.

== Cast ==
=== Main ===
- Rupert Penry-Jones as Adam Carter
- Olga Sosnovska as Fiona Carter
- Raza Jaffrey as Zafar Younis
- Miranda Raison as Jo Portman
- Hugh Simon as Malcolm Wynn-Jones
- Rory MacGregor as Colin Wells
- Nicola Walker as Ruth Evershed
- Peter Firth as Harry Pearce

=== Guest ===
- Anna Chancellor as Juliet Shaw
- James Dicker as Wes Carter
- William Armstrong as Alex Roscoe
- Phyllis Logan as Diana Jewell
- Lindsay Duncan as Angela Wells

== Episodes ==
No. overall	No. in series	Title	Directed by	Written by	Original release date	UK viewers (millions)
27	1	"The Special (Part 1)"	Antonia Bird	Ben Richards	12 September 2005 (BBC One)	6.63
A bomb detonates near to Danny's funeral. Section D's investigation leads to an American-based eco-terrorist group called Shining Dawn, which believes that the human race ought to be culled; they demand the release of their leader from British custody, threatening to detonate a bomb in public places every ten hours. Ruth visits a sympathiser having doubts, Curtis, who is targeted, while Adam and Zaf follow leads. They discover there is a mole in MI5, as both suspects end up dead. They do eventually find the next bomb in a mainline railway station and defuse it. Adam also tracks down a witness, Natasha Scott. Zaf is captured by Shining Dawn members.
28	2	"The Special (Part 2)"	Antonia Bird	Ben Richards	13 September 2005 (BBC One)	6.84
Adam locates and frees Zaf also learning the location of the next bomb, which they defuse. In response Shining Dawn sets the next bomb to only be deactivated with a code. Newcomer Juliet Shaw plays politics by blackmailing Harry, who comes clean about it to the Home Secretary. The mole is identified by Shaw as American liaison to MI5 Richard Boyd. He is soon captured, which leads to the capture of the bomb maker, although Boyd is killed by the American secret service. The bomb is found at a nearby hospital, and Natasha has been captured and strapped to it, forming part of the circuit. After evacuating the hospital, Adam remains behind with Natasha until Curtis assists MI5 by profiling the bomb maker and successfully guessing the deactivation code, ending the threat.
29	3	"Divided They Fall"	Alrick Riley	Ben Richards	15 September 2005 (BBC Three) (Note: "Divided They Fall" was broadcast on 22 September 2005 on BBC One; the rest of the series (apart from the finale) would usually rebroadcast on BBC One seven days after the BBC Three broadcast.)	6.50
Far right political party "The British Way", who are connected to a number of attacks against minority groups, worries the government when they gain support and publicity. Section D is tasked in bring down the party from the inside. Adam poses as a convict to deal with party leader James Moran, while Harry and Fiona deal with William Sampson, an MP who has resigned to force a by-election on defecting to the British Way. They record a meeting with Sampson to replace Moran with MP Pergerine Howard-Davies; Ruth provides Moran with the recording. The plan is successful, but Moran becomes aware of Adam's deception, and has him and Ruth captured and used as quarry in a hunt; they manage to stop and arrest him.
30	4	"Road Trip"	Alrick Riley	Howard Brenton	22 September 2005 (BBC Three)	5.21
Adam goes undercover as a Circassian from Aleppo, Syria in a people-smuggling operation from Istanbul, Turkey to London in an attempt to turn the leader of a terrorist sleeper cell, Mohammed Yazdi and stop a planned terrorist attack against the Houses of Parliament. He seems to have turned Yazdi, when he implicates a Middle-Eastern Prince, Hakim. However, it is revealed that the plan all along was for Yadzi to assassinate the prince, which unfortunately succeeds after they are brought face to face.
31	5	"The Book"	Jeremy Lovering	Raymond Khoury	29 September 2005 (BBC Three)	5.20
Journalist Gary Hicks witnesses the murder of Clive McTaggart, a high-ranking retired intelligence officer and friend of Harry's who was about to publish his memoirs, which contain government secrets. While MI5 investigate and Hicks attempts to publish the story, a group of people from the government is sent to kill him. Meanwhile, aspiring journalist Jo Portman follows the investigation, and Adam, impressed by her skills that lead to a major break in the case, recruits her by the end of the episode. The finale reveals that Taggart mailed Harry the memoirs in the event of his death.
32	6	"The Innocent"	Jeremy Lovering	David Farr	6 October 2005 (BBC Three)	5.83
An Algerian army deserter and terror suspect, Nazim Malik is freed after two years in a British prison. Although he is found to be innocent, MI5 follow his activities, where they discover that he is being forced to conduct an assassination of an Algerian banker on British soil to guarantee the safety of his family. The team save his family, who were held hostage, just before Malik could carry out the assassination and surrenders. By the end of the episode he and his family have been granted asylum in Ireland.
33	7	"Syria"	Omar Madha	Raymond Khoury	13 October 2005 (BBC Three)	5.74
Fiona takes on a case when the Syrian Foreign Minister, Riyad Barzali, contacts MI5 for help, though his own secret service will kill him if he is to talk with the British. She does so because she learned that Farook Sukkarieh, her first husband who was thought to have been hanged for treason, actually survived. He kills Barzali, and captures Fiona to take back to Syria. Adam desperately tries to find Fiona when he loses track of her. He eventually finds her at a small airport, where Fiona is able to wound Farook and escape, but is shot by Farook before he himself is killed by Adam; Fiona later dies in Adam's arms.
34	8	"The Russian"	Omar Madha	Howard Brenton	20 October 2005 (BBC Three)	6.34
After the death of Fiona, Adam is taken off the case to investigate a Russian billionaire Oleg Korsakov, who plans to buy the National Health Service, and then dismantle it. Eventually, Adam convinces Harry to be let back in. They use Hugo Ross, a double agent for the Russians during the Cold War and Zaf for an operation to work with him. MI5 is able to work around Oleg's counter-surveillance measures and expose his plans. In the end, Adam comes to terms with his wife's death and finally tells her parents and Wes about it.
35	9	"The Sting"	Julian Simpson	Rupert Walters	27 October 2005 (BBC Three)	5.98
Juliet dismisses Harry after he stops the CIA from extraditing a British citizen, who turns out to be a terrorist, and is believed to have killed two MI5 officers. While Harry is under surveillance, the rest of the team work to stop the terrorist, where it is revealed that Nick Pollard, an American with counter surveillance skills may actually be involved. In fact, he arranges for the released terrorist to take part in an attack, which is revealed to be a surface-to-air missile against a flight heading for Heathrow, to push the UK and US into going to war against Iran. The attack is stopped and Pollard is arrested. Harry is reinstated.
36	10	"Diana"	Julian Simpson	Howard Brenton	10 November 2005 (BBC One)	6.18
After former MI5 officer Angela Wells visits Ruth, she comes to the Grid and holds everyone hostage, demanding that the service reveals evidence that Harry and MI5 conspired to kill Diana, Princess of Wales, or she will detonate a bomb. The team thinks it has found evidence that Harry sat on a secret committee discussing such a plot, but he reveals this was just a gamed scenario to help increase Diana's security. Ruth tricks Angela and is able to end her threat. The team decides to let Angela go because she was distraught over Peter Haigh's death. However, Angela’s true plan is to blow up the royal family. The team is able to defuse a large bomb in time. When the team returns to Thames House, Angela awaits and uses a sniper rifle to gravely wound Adam, and she then prepares to shoot Harry.
