= Looking After Our Own =

- Spooks episode
- Episode no.: Series 1 Episode 2
- Directed by: Bharat Nalluri
- Written by: David Wolstencroft
- Editing by: Colin Green
- Original air date: 20 May 2002
- Running time: 59 minutes

Guest appearances
- Lisa Faulkner as Helen Flynn; Kevin McNally as Robert Osbourne; Debra Stephenson as Claire Osbourne; Daniel Chenery as Sammy Osbourne; Shane Attwooll as Bryan Lyndon; Tom Goodman-Hill as Nick Thomas/Kieran Harvey; Jasper Jacob as Bill Watson; Rod Hallett as Andrew Dorland; Dominic Kinnaird as Burglar Two; Jonathan Lomas as Burglar Three; Tonya Kerins as Runner; Rory MacGregor as Colin Wells; Eleanor McCready as Rosie; Julian Wadham as Derek Morris

Episode chronology
← Previous "Thou Shalt Not Kill"	Next → "One Last Dance"
- Spooks (series 1)

"Looking After Our Own" is the second episode of the British espionage television series Spooks. It first aired on BBC One in the United Kingdom on 20 May 2002. The episode was written by series creator David Wolstencroft, and directed by Bharat Nalluri. The episode focuses on MI5's efforts in bringing down right-wing leader Robert Osbourne (Kevin McNally), who is believed to be planning a series of race riots across the UK.

The storyline was originally slated for the finale of the first series, but was pushed forward when the producers were pressured to deliver the story to the BBC. Filming took two weeks, around December 2001. After its original broadcast, the episode was viewed by more than eight million Britons, a decline of one million from the first episode, but was still the strongest performer in its time slot. The episode marked the death of a main character, Helen Flynn (Lisa Faulkner), which was met with considerable controversy due to its perceived violence; at 250 complaints, it marked the highest number of complaints for a television programme in 2002.

== Plot ==
MI5 suspect that right-wing leader Robert Osbourne is planning a series of race riots in the UK. A team led by Danny Hunter (David Oyelowo) attempts to bug his home, only to find it impossible because of the home's high-tech countersurveillance equipment. What MI5 does find is that Osbourne abuses his wife Claire (Debra Stephenson); believing Claire is vulnerable for recruitment, Harry Pearce (Peter Firth) appoints Tom Quinn (Matthew Macfadyen) and junior administrative officer Helen Flynn (Lisa Faulkner) to pose as a married couple who are substitute tutors at the same Romford community college Claire is attending.

The two initially succeed, and are invited to dinner with Osbourne at his home. However, during their visit, Osbourne catches Helen out by addressing Tom as her boyfriend rather than husband; Helen's improvising makes Osbourne more suspicious of the two. Later, one of Osbourne's contacts, Nick Thomas (Tom Goodman-Hill), is revealed to be freelance journalist Kieran Harvey. When Osbourne discovers this, he has Harvey murdered. Tom and Helen gain Claire's trust and recruit her; she agrees to help the two in exchange for a £600-a-week account and transport to anywhere in the world.

In the meantime, a cargo of illegal immigrants from Chechnya is intercepted by HM Customs and Excise; the traffickers throw their cargo overboard, drowning them. Believing the traffickers will change their routes, Tessa Phillips (Jenny Agutter) and Zoe Reynolds (Keeley Hawes) investigate and discover that Osbourne intends to choke the asylum system by overcrowding the holding centres, and after his followers stir up the race riots, Osbourne would encourage independent Member of Parliament (MP) Bill Watson (Jasper Jacob) to raise the issue of asylum seekers in the House of Commons.

Tom and Helen prepare to move out, but are kidnapped by Osbourne's gang and taken to the kitchen of his waste management plant for interrogation. Knowing they are MI5 officers, Osbourne demands everything Tom knows about their operation; when he fails to co-operate, Osbourne forces Helen's hand and then head into a deep fryer, then has her executed. Before Tom can suffer the same fate, Claire throws a cigarette into the vat, which ignites, buying Tom time to escape and return to Thames House. However, Tom and Harry are disgusted to hear that the powers-that-be are happy about Helen's murder and Osbourne's plans, since it discredits the far right, and enables the government to gain a political victory and gain consensus on an immigration policy. Additionally, they refuse to take any action against Osbourne, in order to track the movements of all far-right groups, until the surveillance has finished. At the end of the episode, Harry has Osbourne assassinated, and Claire and her son are in an airport about to catch a flight abroad. Bill Watson receives photographs of the dead refugees washed up on a beach, along with a note reading "are you happy with your wash?"

== Production ==
=== Writing and pre-production ===
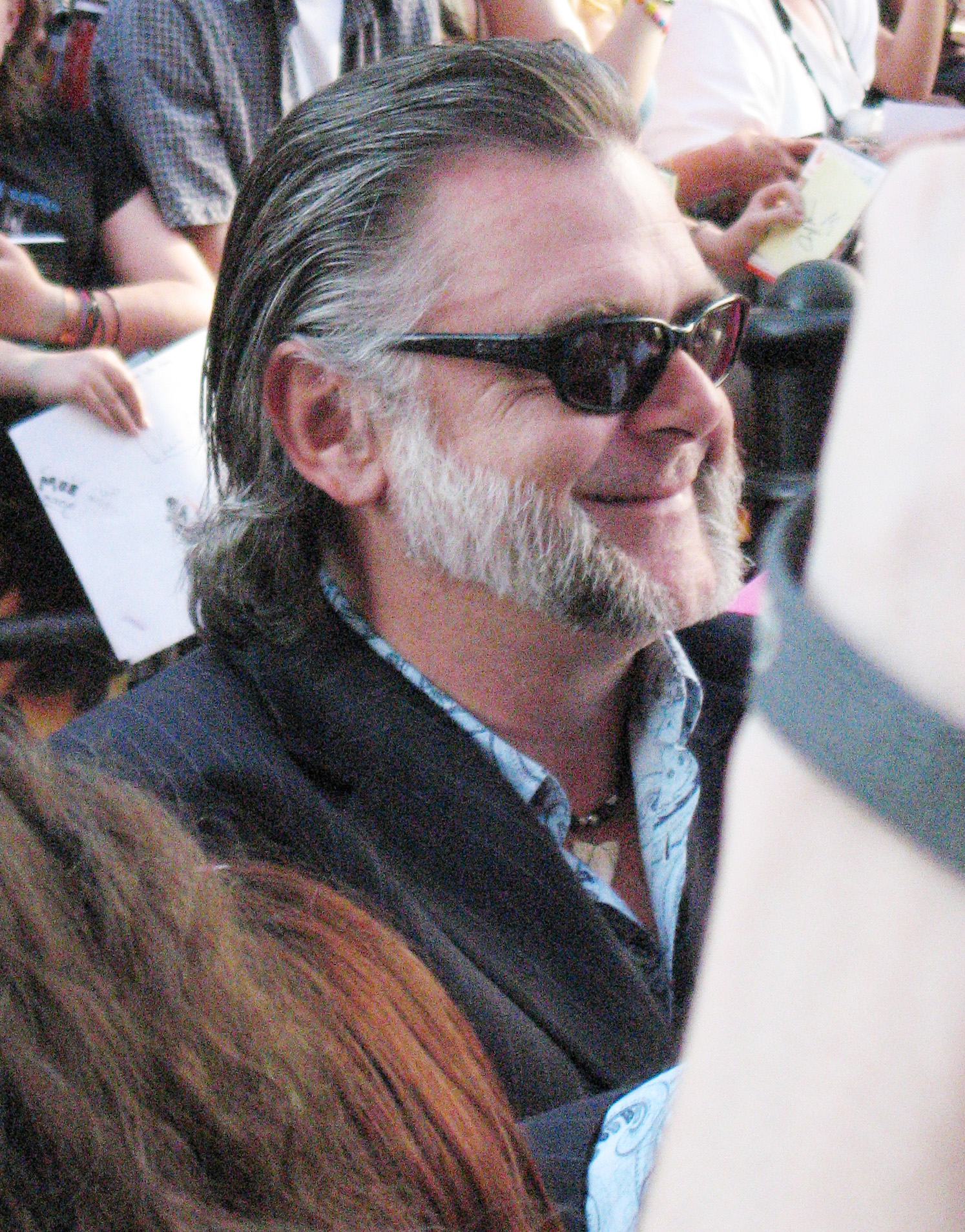
Kevin McNally guest stars as antagonist Robert Osbourne.

The episode's storyline, including Helen's death, was meant to be in the first series finale. However, by then, the second episode was not yet written, and series producer Kudos were due to deliver the story to the BBC in one month. As a result, the episode was brought forward to the second slot. Since the first episode began Spooks "with a bang", series creator and writer David Wolstencroft, was under pressure to top the efforts of the first episode with the second, but not by much. During the writing stage, he introduced a story arc involving Danny Hunter and his obsession with money and spending, apparently mirroring the writer; the arc was created for the temptations that the officers may have. In the original screenplay, Danny was to spend on his mother.

Wolstencroft included some suggestions from his friends and girlfriend. An early scene was to take place in a shower room, but was rewritten when the producers thought it would be "too racy" for a 9:00 p.m. audience. In another instance, a long sequence would take place at sea concerning the smugglers dropping off illegal immigrants into the water; the scenes were cut before filming due to time constraints. Also, before deciding on waste disposal, Osbourne was originally going to head a security company. The funeral scene towards the end of the episode was inspired by The Godfather II. In the end, the script was rewritten four times before the BBC took the final version of the episode.

Kevin McNally was cast as the antagonist Robert Osbourne; McNally was chosen because the producers thought he would be perfect to play the part, as is the case with Debra Stephenson, who portrayed his wife. Child actor Daniel Chenery, who played the part of their son, Sammy, was chosen due to his likeness of a younger version of McNally. Also, Simon Crawford Collins's wife made a cameo appearance as a BT operator.

=== Filming ===
Filming took place over a 13 to 14 days period in December 2001. It was not filmed on order of the script; the scenes set around the Osbourne residence for instance, were all filmed at once, during two to three days, though during the episodes, the scenes took place in separate parts of the episode. Parts of the introduction scenes, where Danny's team break into Osbourne's house, was actually filmed on the Grid set. Parts of the sequence were originally filmed without sound; the sound would later be added during post production. The footage of the drowned immigrants found at the shore were shot by the second unit headed by producer Simon Crawford Collins on a pebbled courtyard in Kensington to double as a beach.

Some of the exterior scenes at night were filmed with the street wet down so that the lights could kick off the ground. Also in the episode, the editing suite, where the series was edited, was used as a set. The West12 shopping centre in Shepherd's Bush, London was used in one scene as an airport, as well as the shopping centre itself in another. The Chadford Community College was filmed at a rugby club. The safe house Tom and Helen were appointed to was filmed in two separate locations. One of those locations was used before in the Mary Kane interrogation scene in the pilot episode "Thou Shalt Not Kill". In one scene where Tom was driving to the operation the car was in fact towed; an error was made in the episode where the car looked taller than the other cars on the road during the shoot.

=== Helen Flynn death scene ===
"I really wanted to make sure that the audience got the message that the world of Spooks isn't the world where the cavalry always arrive, because in reality these people [MI5] do risk their lives on our behalf and they do get into sticky situations with genuinely nasty people."

— Series creator David Wolstencroft

Wolstencroft wrote the death scene with the intention of giving the audience the impression that no one in the series is safe. According to producer Jane Featherstone, the idea to kill off a main character involved a female getting "her head set on fire" later in the series, but she decided "let's move the most dramatic thing you've got to episode two and kill off the only actress the audience recognise [Faulkner was considered the only recognisable cast member when the series was introduced] and then you've got them hooked." Matthew Macfadyen stated that the shooting of the death scene, although not emotionally draining, was gruelling to perform.

Director Bharat Nalluri wanted as little of the torture to be seen as possible, because he wanted the sequence to be more psychological to make it easier to frighten the audience, since they know the physicality of being burnt, whereas if Helen was shot, not as many would. Producer Stephen Garrett wanted to show a more realistic sense of violence, rather than a fantastical "cartoon violence" "in which blows to the head with iron bars leave small bruises rather than crushed skulls, gunshot wounds leave neat abrasions in conveniently fleshy parts of the anatomy rather than eviscerating their victims; and fights that would hospitalise Mike Tyson are walked away from with barely a mark."

== Broadcast, reception and controversy ==
The episode was first broadcast on 20 May 2002, during the 9 to 10 pm time slot. It achieved overnight viewing figures of 7.8 million, with a 35 per cent audience share. Ratings were down over one million from the pilot episode the previous week. Regardless "Looking After Our Own" won its time slot; the finale episode of ITV1 drama Helen West came second, with 4.9 million viewers and a 21 per cent share. The final numbers posted on the Broadcasters' Audience Research Board website went up slightly to 8.1 million viewers, making the episode the ninth most viewed BBC One broadcast, and the nineteenth most viewed broadcast in total the week it aired.

The episode attracted controversy following the demise of Helen Flynn after her hand and head were forced into a deep fryer. The death scenes attracted more than 250 complaints, 154 of them to the television watchdog, the Broadcasting Standards Commission, the highest number of complaints for a television programme in 2002. In the wake of the complaints, BBC insiders had admitted that the scenes "clearly disturbed" some of the viewers, but also defended their decision to show the scene as it would show the audience "the kind of threat which might be faced by agents engaged in the fight against terrorism." The Broadcasting Standards Commission stated that the content "in the context was acceptable and important for the later narrative"; however, the watchdog still criticised the BBC for failing to warn viewers of the violence to come. Garrett rejected this, stating: "Not only was there a clear warning before the programme began, but for anyone who missed that, the subject matter of the episode (a conspiracy to stir up inter-racial violence perpetrated by a man who clearly beat his wife) was hardly the stuff of which chirpy little bucolic fantasies are made."

Wolstencroft stated that after watching the episode with his friends, they both commended and criticised his work: "I got some angry phone calls from my friends the next day saying 'how could you, but well done, but how could you, but she was so nice, but how could you, but well done'." Oyelowo also responded to the controversy, believing that it came from a result of Faulkner's male fans. Comedian Charlie Brooker however, commended the scene, as well as the series in general, stating in his Guardian column: "The moment her head was forced into the deep-fat-fryer, viewers reared on the formulaic, it'll-be-alright-in-the-end blandness of cookie-cutter populist dramas like Casualty and Merseybeat sat up and blinked in disbelief: here was a major BBC drama series that actually had the nerve to confound expectation." In a January 2010 poll, fans of the show voted Helen's death as the "most shocking death scene" in the series, drawing 49% of the votes.
