= Wynn-Jones =

Wynn-Jones is a Welsh surname. Notable people with the surname include:

- Malcolm Wynn-Jones, fictional character in the British television series Spooks
- Michael Wynn-Jones (born 1941), Welsh writer, editor, and joint majority shareholder of Norwich City F.C.
