= Smoke and Mirrors (Spooks) =

- Spooks episode
- Episode no.: Series 2 Episode 10
- Directed by: Sam Miller
- Written by: Howard Brenton
- Original air date: 11 August 2003
- Running time: 60 minutes

Guest appearances
- Tomas Arana as Herman Joyce/Zeigler; Samantha Coughlan as Lisa Joyce; Bruce Payne as Michael Karharias; Mac McDonald as Hard Faced Man; Elizabeth Chambers as Woman

Episode chronology
← Previous "The Seventh Division"	Next → "Project Friendly Fire"
- Spooks (series 2)

"Smoke and Mirrors", known as "Pit of Secrets" in the United States, is the tenth and final episode of the second series, and the 16th episode overall of the British television series Spooks. It first aired on BBC One on 11 August 2003. The episode was written by Howard Brenton, and directed by Sam Miller. In the episode, Tom Quinn (Matthew Macfadyen) is being framed by thought-to-be-dead CIA agent Herman Joyce (Tomas Arana), as revenge for what happened to his daughter. After its original broadcast, the finale was seen by seven million people, a third of the television audience during its time slot. The episode, particularly due to its cliffhanger, received critical acclaim.

== Plot ==
The episode begins in Miami, Florida, where three masked men break into the apartment of hitman Michael Karharias (Bruce Payne), who is under house arrest. The head of the group employs Karharias to kill an Englishman, but on the condition that he "do it dead". The leader then shoots Karharias to death.

Later, in London, Tom Quinn (Matthew Macfadyen) and CIA liaison Christine Dale (Megan Dodds) meet at a hotel, where Christine hands Tom a telex from the CIA office where they receive intelligence of Karharias (not knowing he is dead) travelling to London to assassinate a member of the British Cabinet. Because Christine has no clearance reading the file, and that the CIA does not intend to inform MI5 of the threat, Tom appoints a reluctant Danny Hunter (David Oyelowo) and Zoe Reynolds (Keeley Hawes) to run a secret operation to intercept the assassin without the knowledge of their superior Harry Pearce (Peter Firth). The trio try, and fail, to apprehend "Karharias" before the CIA does. Danny later decides to follow Tom as the latter is chasing a lead. There, Danny comes across a fake passport with Tom's picture on it, indicating that he is creating a legend without MI5's knowledge. Harry soon becomes aware of the trio's activities.

Tom, meanwhile, follows CIA agent Herb Zeigler (Tomas Arana) to a dead drop, leading to a countryside farm house. The trio are captured. After Danny is beaten, the group take Zoe. In that time, Danny confronts Tom about the legend he is creating, but Tom insists he is not making one. Danny's suspicion is solidified when the masked men act as if Tom was on their side, by letting him go. They sedate Danny and Zoe and leave them to escape when they regain consciousness. They report back to Harry, where they all reluctantly agree that Tom is setting up the legend to escape the country after the assassination; Karharias was found dead in Miami, and there is no record to suggest the CIA even had intelligence of an assassination plot.

As this transpires, Tom is tricked into handling a Gepard M1 sniper rifle in order to get his fingerprints on the weapon. Zeigler reveals himself to be Herman Joyce, a legendary CIA agent who has a grudge against Tom. It is revealed that Tom recruited Joyce's daughter Lisa to infiltrate an anarchist group. The mission went wrong and as a result, Lisa is in a mental hospital in Maine. Joyce has been planning to elaborately frame Tom for an assassination. Joyce and his team leave Tom, who runs to a nearby house to report to his team. By this time, he learns that Sir John Stone, the Chief of the Defence Staff, was killed, with a sniper rifle left with his fingerprints on it. Supposedly expert agents Danny, Zoe and Harry are fully duped, meet Tom to inform him that Joyce was killed in a car accident five years ago, and resoundingly refuse to believe Tom's claim of being set up. Harry is going to call for back-up, forcing Tom to shoot Harry with a shotgun. Tom disappears into the North Sea.

== Production ==
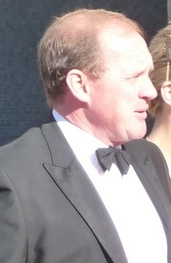
In an interview, Rupert Penry-Jones and Peter Firth (pictured) joked that the latter's character was nearly killed off due to punishment for asking the BBC for a pay rise.

Writer Howard Brenton found writing the end difficult because the producers knew Matthew Macfadyen would leave the series, but not whether he'd return in the beginning of the third series. He stated that the producers "didn't know whether Matthew was going to return to the series or not. We knew there'd be a third series, but we didn't know whether he'd be in it. So I said 'well, is he going to be in it, or isn't he'. And for some times it was, 'oh he's not going to be', so I kill him. And then he said he is gonna be in it, so I unkill him." Because of this, Brenton wrote twelve drafts of the episode. In the end, he wrote a "big cliffhanger, in which he could be dead, could be gone forever, or what." The character Herman Joyce was created by Brenton to become a worthy opponent to Tom. Joyce's creation was inspired from the "great criminal minds" such as Karla from John le Carré and Moriarty from Sherlock Holmes. Brenton thought the addition of Joyce would be a fitting end, so that if Tom was defeated, it would be by a master who would later be undone in some way with or without him.

Brenton chose the name of an assassin, Mickey Karharias, because "Karharias" is Greek for Shark; the producers thought that Karharias was a "real villain name." Having him killed in the beginning to set up the episode was influenced by The Man Who Never Was. The episode also included Zoe being untrusting towards Tom, because Brenton wanted her to be resentful towards his affair with Dale, and placing allegiance with her rather than his team. In an interview on Top Gear in June 2008, Rupert Penry-Jones and Peter Firth commented on the near-death experiences on the characters. Regarding Harry's shooting, Penry-Jones joked to Jeremy Clarkson, "Every time [Peter Firth] asks for more money or five day weeks, they start giving him scenes where he might die."

The love scene between Christine Dale and Tom Quinn were one of actress Megan Dodds' favourite to film because she was relaxed. There was a discussion beforehand on how much clothing each of the actors are comfortable with removing. The scenes set in Miami took place in Peckham. Also, one scene where a shop owner props up water from the shelter and almost missing Macfadyen was not in the script, and was shot by accident. However, it was decided the incident would be useful.

== Broadcast and reception ==
"Smoke and Mirrors" was initially broadcast on Monday, 11 August 2003 on BBC One. The finale was seen by a third of the television audience during its time slot, receiving overnight viewership of seven million. The episode beat Diamonds Are Forever on ITV1, which received 4.6 million viewers in the same time slot. According to the Broadcasters' Audience Research Board, the finale received final ratings of 7.32 million viewers, making Spooks the sixth most seen broadcast on BBC One, and is the 16th most seen broadcast in total the week it aired.

In the "Best of Drama" viewer polls at BBC Online, the cliffhanger was voted the second in the most "Favourite Moment" category. The scene was beaten only by the return of "Dirty Den" Watts in EastEnders. Whilst reviewing the seventh series, Leigh Holmwood of The Guardian's Organ Grinder blog named "Smoke and Mirrors" his "favourite Spooks episode." In review of the DVD boxset of the second series boxset, Dennis Landmann of MovieFreak reacted very positively to the finale, noting that the drama and intensity of the second series builds until the last episode. Landmann stated, "the last thirty or so minutes had me on the edge of my bed, [...] and the last five minutes were so powerful they affected how I felt for the next couple of days; I kept thinking about [Tom Quinn] and the tragic events that happened to him." Michael Mackenzie of Home Cinema called the finale "chaotic", and that the chain of events leading to the ending was "extremely well set up."
