= Esther Hall =

English actress (born 1970)

- Born: 28 August 1970 (age 55); Manchester, Lancashire, England

Esther Jane Hall (born 28 August 1970) is an English actress who has appeared in a number of television dramas. She is most notable for her performance in Black Mirror “Hated in the Nation”.

== Early life ==
Born in Manchester in 1970 and brought up in Cheshire, she took A levels in Manchester before training in theatre arts for three years at the University of Leeds's Bretton Hall College, where she gained a Bachelor of Arts degree.

== Career ==
Hall's first high-profile role was as Romey Sullivan in the television drama Queer as Folk (1999–2000), in which she played one half of a lesbian couple who conceive a baby with the help of their gay best friend. In 2001 she appeared in the award-winning TV drama Men Only as Katie, the wife of Mac (Marc Warren). Roles in Always and Everyone (2000–01), Serious and Organised (2003) and an adaptation of D.H. Lawrence's Sons and Lovers (2003) followed. Hall played Ellie Simm, the girlfriend of main character Tom Quinn in Spooks from 2002 to 2003.

In 2004 Hall starred in the second episode of the seventh series of Midsomer Murders ("Bad Tidings") as Cassie Woods, a school friend of Cully Barnaby. In 2005 Hall joined the main cast of Waking the Dead as Felix Gibson, replacing Holly Aird in the cast as the resident team pathologist, but the character lasted only one series. Subsequent roles included BBC dramas Rome (2005–2007) and True Dare Kiss (2007). She also spoke to Nelson Mandela about Iraq.

Hall is also known for co-starring in the high-profile BT advertisements opposite Kris Marshall from 2005 to 2011, in which she played a single mother with two children who started a relationship with Marshall's character and later moved in with and married him. In 2014, Hall appeared in the BBC daytime soap Doctors as Toni Macpherson. Also in 2014, she appeared as Lady Macbeth in Macbeth at The Mercury Theatre, Colchester.

In 2016, Hall appeared in the Black Mirror episode "Hated in the Nation" and as DI Nina Ryman in “Flight: Parts 1 and 2” S19:E3&4 of Silent Witness. In 2017 she played Cindy Watson (editor of The Weatherfield Gazette) in Coronation Street (a role she later reprised in February 2020), and also appeared in rival soap EastEnders in 2019 playing the role of Dr Elinor Waters. Her most recent roles have been as Cat Barling in BBC drama Casualty, and a brief cameo appearance in an episode of Killing Eve.
