= Zoe Reynolds =

Fictional character from Spooks, created 2002

- Spooks character
- First appearance: "Thou Shalt Not Kill" (Series 1)
- Last appearance: "Persephone" (Series 3)
- Portrayed by: Keeley Hawes

In-universe information
- Gender: Female
- Occupation: Former: Junior Case Officer, Section D
- Spouse: Will North (fiancé)
- Children: Unnamed daughter

Zoe Reynolds is a fictional case officer in the counterterrorism department of MI5, featured in the British television series Spooks, also known as MI5 in the United States. The character is played by Keeley Hawes.

One of the character's main talents in the show is linguistics, and she is shown translating Serbian dialogue in the first episode of series two.

Zoe is a junior case officer in Section D, which she joined shortly before September 1997, and is part of the original leading trio of field agents (along with Tom Quinn and Danny Hunter). At the end of the second episode of the show, she moves in with Danny and the two young spooks form a very strong, though platonic, bond.
