= Hugh Simon =

British actor

Hugh Simon is a British actor, best known for his portrayal of the character Malcolm Wynn-Jones in the television series Spooks. His other TV credits include Shackleton, Attachments, Cold Feet, North Square, Big Bad World, and "Unusual Suspects" (an episode of Highlander: The Series).

He has also appeared on stage in the 2005 London revival of Epitaph for George Dillon, and in the film Possession. In January 2022, he portrayed the role of Adrian Walker in the BBC soap opera Doctors.
