= Rory MacGregor =

British actor

- Born: Widnes, England
- Education: Rose Bruford College

Rory MacGregor is a British actor, who has played a variety of roles on television, generally in the 2000s.

MacGregor was born in Widnes, England. He trained at Rose Bruford College of Speech and Drama, graduating in 1999.

He is best known as Colin Wells in the BBC television series Spooks, a part he performed from 2002 to 2006.
