= Harry Pearce =

Fictional character from spooks

Sir Harry Pearce KBE
- Spooks character
- First appearance: Series 1, Episode 1
- Last appearance: Spooks: The Greater Good
- Portrayed by: Peter Firth

In-universe information
- Gender: Male
- Occupation: Head of MI5 counter-terrorism department - "Section D" (1994–2015)
- Family: Ben Pearce (brother)
- Spouse: Jane Townsend (1977–1986; divorced)
- Children: Catherine Townsend (daughter); Graham Pearce (son)

Sir Henry James Pearce, KBE (born 1 November 1953) is a fictional character, head of the counter-terrorism department ("Section D") of MI5 as featured in the British television series Spooks. He was played by Peter Firth during the whole run of the series from 2002 to 2011, and reprised for the 2015 film, Spooks: The Greater Good.

== Career ==
After attending the University of Oxford, Pearce went to the Royal Military Academy Sandhurst before joining the Light Blue Dragoons. Upon leaving the army he joined MI5 where he completed his training in June 1977.

Pearce was then seconded to the Secret Intelligence Service (aka MI6), where he was stationed in Paris, under Juliet Shaw. During this time he worked in Iran, where he had an affair with Shaw.

On his return to MI5, Pearce was assigned to Section D, the counter-terrorism department (then at Gower Street), where he was a junior field officer, then senior field officer, and during the events of the series head of department.

In Series 6, Episode 3, Harry received a letter from 10 Downing Street, informing him that The Queen wished to bestow a knighthood upon him. He was already a Commander of the Order of the British Empire, the grade immediately below that of Knight Commander, which he now is.

== Personal life ==
In Series 3, Pearce was revealed to be divorced, with two children. It had been previously mentioned that he had not told his wife what his profession was until their wedding day (15 June 1977). He met his wife, Jane, an English teacher, during their studies at Oxford. They had a daughter, Catherine, on 25 April 1980, followed by a son, Graham, on 18 June 1983, before "Jane filed for divorce, citing irreconcilable differences" in October 1986.

While his ex-wife and son have never appeared on screen, Pearce's daughter, portrayed by Caroline Carver, appeared in Series 3, Episode 4 – at the start of the episode he regarded her as emotional and as one to "spot a bird with a broken wing", but in the course of the episode's events, he shows how deeply he cares for her and has grown to respect her intelligence.

Harry had an ongoing relationship with Ruth Evershed, another one of the main characters. Over the years, it appears that they formed a strong bond. In Series 4, the two became closer, forming a good working relationship as well as an unsaid personal connection. At the very beginning of series 5, he realized that he was in love with her. Their relationship was brought to a head in series 5, when he worked up the courage to ask her to dinner. However, Ruth, upset by what her colleagues thought of the relationship, called it off at the end of the episode.

== Reception ==
This character was considered by many fans to be the pillar of the show, providing both a backbone to the team and was often the cause of many of the comic relief situations present in the series, most notably in his exchanges during series 1 with Jools Siviter, played by Hugh Laurie. Another comic theme includes Harry getting annoyed every time someone would enter his office without knocking. This grew so much that in the series three finale, when Ruth came to warn him that something was wrong, Harry guessed it because she had knocked.

He is well respected by his colleagues and survives four cliffhangers where it appears he is about to be killed (series 2, series 4, series 7 and series 9) and the tenth series is a plotline that revolves around Harry; his past and his relationship with Ruth.

He was the only character to have appeared in every single episode in the show.

Benji Wilson of The Daily Telegraph in describing Harry and Ruth's relationship commented that "(Ruth's) scenes with Peter Firth, another fine player, have become self-contained little bubbles of weltschmerz within every recent episode".
