= Malcolm Wynn-Jones =

Fictional character from Spooks

- Spooks character
- First appearance: Series 1, Episode 1
- Last appearance: Spooks: The Greater Good
- Portrayed by: Hugh Simon

In-universe information
- Gender: Male
- Occupation: Former: Technician and Data Analyst, Section D
- Family: Mother

Malcolm Wynn-Jones is a character played by Hugh Simon in British television series Spooks, known as MI5 in the United States.

The character's role is MI5 analyst and according to the fictional accompaniment material released by the BBC his full name Malcolm Peregrine Geoffrey St. John Wynn Jones.

The character retires at the start of Series 8 (2009) but returns in Series 9 (2010) and in the feature film Spooks: The Greater Good.
