= Danny Hunter =

Fictional character from spooks

- Spooks character
- David Oyelowo as Danny Hunter
- First appearance: Series 1, Episode 1
- Last appearance: Series 3, Episode 10
- Portrayed by: David Oyelowo

In-universe information
- Gender: Male
- Occupation: Junior Case Officer, Section D

Danny Hunter is a fictional character appearing in the first three seasons of the BBC television series Spooks, known as MI5 in the United States. The character, played by British actor David Oyelowo, is a Junior Case Officer in Section D, the counter-terrorism department of MI5. According to the fictional Spooks: Harry's Diary—one of several spin-off books created by Kudos, the series' production company—Hunter joined Section D in June 2000.

The BBC website created for the show characterises Danny Hunter as young, sharp, and good at his job, commenting that "no-one could touch him for surveillance skills." He has expensive taste and is chewed out by department head Harry Pearce after it is discovered that he has been using MI5 resources to increase his credit limit. Nevertheless, he is able to make good decisions in high-pressure environments, as shown in the fourth episode of series 2, when he works undercover as a trader at a bank.

The character dies in the last episode of series 3. A BBC source commented to the Mirror (London) that actor David Oyelowo "decided this was as far as he could take his character, Danny Hunter--who certainly doesn't see his departure coming in the show."
