= Fingercuffs =

Fingercuffs may refer to:

- Chinese finger trap, a practical joke device
- Thumbcuffs, a restraint device

== See also ==
- Fingercuff Productions, a British film production company
