= Francesca Fowler =

British actress

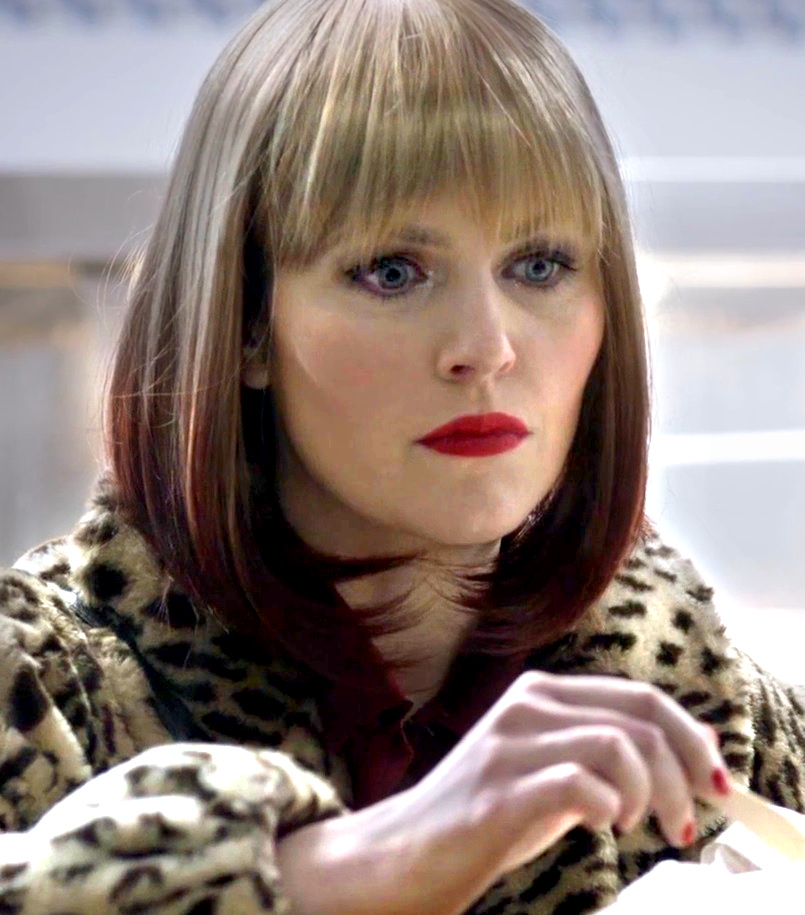
- Fowler in 2016
- Born: 1985; Hammersmith, London, England
- Occupation(s): Actress, screenwriter

Francesca Fowler (born 1985, Hammersmith, London) is a British actress and screenwriter. She appeared in the 2007 thriller film Straightheads alongside Gillian Anderson and Danny Dyer, and has also appeared in Rome HBO, and various BBC TV series. In 2019 she won BAFTA Rocliffe TV Comedy.

== Career ==
Fowler made her acting debut in the British TV film, Like Father Like Son for ITV. Going on to further appear in HBO/BBC Rome opposite Ray Stevenson

She appeared in the fourth new series of Doctor Who alongside David Tennant, Catherine Tate, Peter Capaldi, Phil Davis and Karen Gillan. In 2014 starred in the Vegan horror film The Herd, from Melanie Light.

Her debut short film 28 Years Later was nominated for Best Comedy at Portobello Film Festival. Her screenplay Pitfall won the award for best screenwriter at the 2012 Underwire Film Festival.

In 2016 she starred in the crime thriller Red opposite Branko Tomovic and Dervla Kirwan, playing the role of young prostitute Mia for which she was nominated for a Maverick Movie Award.

In 2017 her directorial debut short film Away From Me premiered at BFI Flare Film Festival and comedy short film Pull, written and starring, premiered at LOCO Film Festival.

She is a BAFTA Rocliffe and John Brabourne Award Winning screenwriter.

== Filmography ==
- Like Father Like Son (2005), Bethan Milne
- Last Rights (2005), Liz
- Bad Girls (2005), Laura Canning – TV series, 1 episode, Series 7 - Episode 4
- Can You Take It? (2005), Annie
- Rome (2005), Egeria – TV series, episode "Egeria"
- The Golden Hour (2005), Lillian Harris / Coma Patient – TV series, 4 episodes
- Straightheads (2007), Sophie
- Doctor Who (2008), Evelina – TV series, episode "The Fires of Pompeii"
- Commitment (2009), Sasha – Fingercuff Productions
- Doctors (2009), Lauren Reeve – TV series, 2 episodes
- Forest of the Damned 2 (2009), Lucy
- Casualty (2011), Victoria
- Red (2016), (Mia)
