= Red (2016 film) =

- Directed by: Branko Tomovic
- Written by: Branko Tomovic; Paul D. Clancy
- Produced by: Adrian Carswell; Branko Tomovic; Dina Vickermann; Khaled Kaissar; Tobias Huber
- Release date: 13 September 2016 (Naperville Independent Film Festival)
- Running time: 20 minutes
- Countries: United Kingdom, Germany
- Language: English

Red is a short dark thriller set in the underground world of illegal organ smuggling, the so-called red market. It's the directing debut of Branko Tomovic who is probably best known in the US for playing Jack Bauer's sidekick in the recent 24: Live Another Day series and stars British actress Francesca Fowler with Irish actress Dervla Kirwan as the sadistic and cruel crime boss.

== Synopsis ==
A damaged and guilt-ridden man who works in the underground world of illegal organ smuggling is looking for a way out.

== Plot ==
Niklas, a surgeon who lives a life of solitude and is tormented by self-hatred, performs regular illegal surgeries for the red market. He works together with Mia, a young prostitute who lures her clients in and drugs them. Niklas is looking for a way out of this dark world, but owes his life to their violent crime boss Ed, who would rather kill him then let him go.

== Cast ==
- Branko Tomovic as Niklas
- Francesca Fowler as Mia
- Dervla Kirwan as Ed

=== Awards ===
- 4th Kraljevski Filmski Festival, Serbia 2016 – Winner – Best Short Film
- 13th Maverick Movie Awards, USA 2016 – Winner – Best Actor
- 4th Fort Worth Indie Film Showcase, USA 2017 – Winner – Best International Short
- 8th Underground Cinema Awards, Ireland 2017 – Winner – Best International Film
- 2nd Unrestricted View Film Festival, UK 2017 – Winner – Best Actor, Best Screenplay
- 3rd Flagship City International Film Festival, USA 2017 – Winner – Best Actress
- 6th Carmarthen Bay Film Festival, UK 2017 – Nominated – Best Short Film (Bafta Qualifying)
- 9th Naperville Independent Film Festival, USA 2016 – Nominated – Best Short Film
- 5th Winchester Short Film Festival, UK 2016 – Nominated – Best British Short Film
- 4th North Hollywood Cinefest, USA 2017 – Nominated – Best Thriller Short
- 2nd Uk Screen One International Film Festival, UK 2017 – Nominated – Best Short Film
- 1st Jim Thorpe Independent Film Festival, USA 2017 – Nominated – Best Actor
- 3rd Flagship City International Film Festival, USA 2017 – Nominated – Best Director, Best Short Film, Best Actor
- 13th Maverick Movie Awards, USA 2016 – Nominated – Best Picture, Best Director, Best Actress, Best Supporting Actress, Best Ensemble Performance, Best Cinematography, Best Special Effects
- 4th Fort Worth Indie Film Showcase, USA 2017 – Nominated – Best Genre Short
- 2nd Unrestricted View Film Festival, UK 2017 – Nominated – Best Art Direction, Best Make Up/Costume
- 15th San Diego International Film Festival, USA 2016 – Official Competition
- 22nd International Short Film Festival In Drama, Greece 2016 – Official Competition (European Film Award Qualifying)
- 8th Berlin Independent Film Festival, Germany 2017 – Official Competition
- 40th Grenzland-Filmtage Selb, Germany 2017 – Official Competition
- 9th Tangier International Film Festival, Morocco 2016 – Official Competition
- 11th Scenecs International Film Festival, Netherlands 2017 – Official Competition
- 7th Kaohsiung Film Festival, Taiwan 2017 – Official Competition
- 20th Long Island International Film Expo, USA 2017 – Official Competition
- 7th Itsa Film Festival, USA 2016 – Official Competition
- 17th International Izmir Short Film Festival, Turkey 2016 – Official Selection
- 1st Cardiff International Film Festival, UK 2017 – Official Competition
- 32nd Wv International Film Festival, USA 2017 – Official Selection
- 2nd Los Angeles Cinefest, USA 2016 – Official Competition
- 4th Fly Film Festival, USA 2017 – Official Competition
- 6th Showroom Shorts, UK 2016 – Official Selection
- 3rd Nassau Film Festival, USA 2017 – Official Competition
- 2nd Vault Film Festival, UK 2017 – Official Selection
