= Dervla Kirwan =

Irish actress (born 1971)

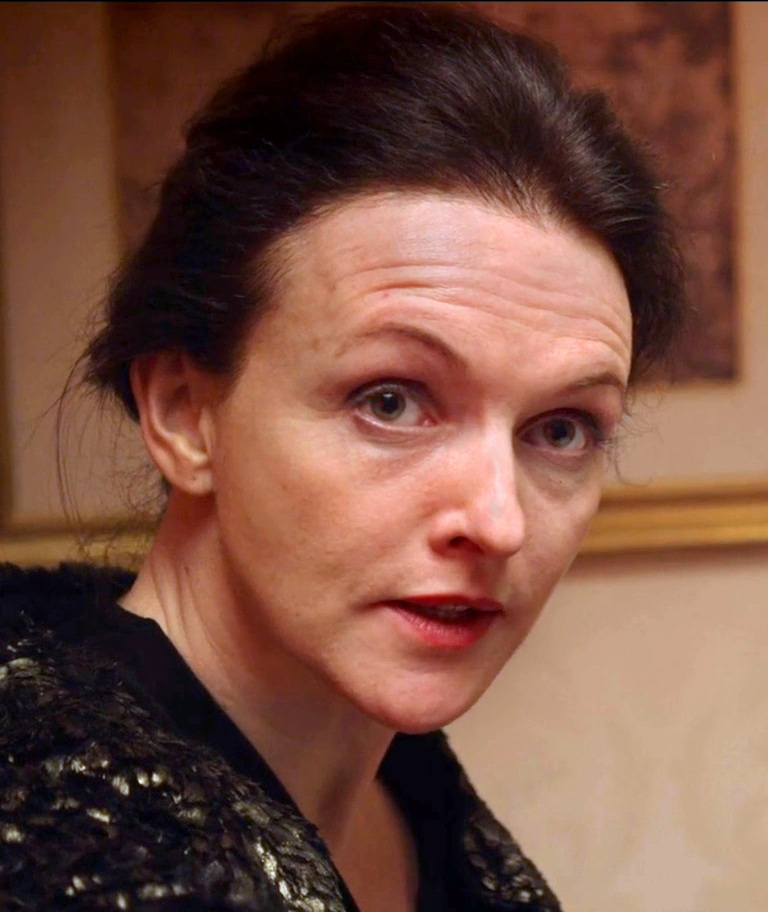
- Kirwan in Red
- Born: 24 October 1971 (age 55); Churchtown, Dublin, Ireland
- Occupation: Actress
- Years active: 1986–present
- Spouse: Rupert Penry-Jones (m. 2007)
- Children: 2

Dervla Kirwan (born 24 October 1971) is an Irish actress. She has received a number of accolades, including two IFTA Awards for her performances in the film Ondine (2009) and the RTÉ thriller series Smother (2021–2023).

Kirwan began her career in the BBC series Goodnight Sweetheart (1993–1996) and Ballykissangel (1996–1998), the latter of which won her a National Television Award. This was followed by further BBC roles in Hearts and Bones (2000–2001), 55 Degrees North (2004–2005), True Dare Kiss (2007), and Material Girl and The Silence (both 2010). She guest-starred in the Doctor Who Christmas special "The Next Doctor" (2008).

== Early life ==
Dervla Kirwan was born on 24 October 1971 in the affluent Churchtown suburb of Dublin, Ireland. Her father, Peter Kirwan, was an insurance broker, and her mother, Maureen O'Driscoll, was a language teacher. She is the youngest of three daughters. She attended Loreto Beaufort, a Catholic school for girls in Rathfarnham, until the age of 16, when she was asked to leave as her career as an actress started to progress. Kirwan completed secondary school at the now-defunct non-denominational Sandymount High School in Sandymount.

During an episode of Who Do You Think You Are? that aired in 2010, Kirwan learned more about her ancestors. One of her great-grandmothers was Margaret Collins-O'Driscoll, sister of Irish nationalist leader Michael Collins. Her maternal grandfather, Finian O'Driscoll, was Collins's nephew, and spent three years with the Irish Republican Army (IRA).

One of her paternal great-grandfathers, Henry Kahn, was a Polish Jewish immigrant who had married her grandmother, Teresa O'Shea, a Catholic, in Ireland. In 1902, judge Frederick Falkiner sentenced Kahn to a year in prison for breaking a shop window. The trial was known as a "notorious miscarriage of justice" and likely inspired a passage in James Joyce's novel Ulysses.

== Career ==
=== Television ===
Kirwan's first credited TV roles were in the TV series Troubles in 1988 and The Lilac Bus in 1990 alongside Stephanie Beacham based on Maeve Binchy's novel. Her breakthrough television role was as Bernadette Kennedy in the 1991 BBC Scotland production of A Time To Dance, adapted by Melvyn Bragg from his own novel. Kirwan briefly appeared in Casualty, and starred in the first three seasons of Goodnight Sweetheart alongside Nicholas Lyndhurst. For 23 episodes, from 1996 to 1998, she featured in Ballykissangel in the role of Assumpta Fitzgerald, the landlady of the village's only pub, Fitzgerald's. She reprised this role for a Comic Relief special of The Vicar of Dibley, and for a Father Ted special. In 1999, she appeared in another BBC production, a made-for-TV Christmas film called The Greatest Store in the World. She played the single mother of two girls who are made homeless a few days before Christmas. The show ran for two seasons. She starred in the Sky TV series The Bombmaker as a former IRA bomb-maker, and in 2001, she played Emma Rose in the BBC series Hearts and Bones. She appeared in the BBC1 crime drama series 55 Degrees North with Don Gilet, which aired in 2004. She returned for a second season in 2005. The series was shown in the US under the title The Night Detective. In 2007, she appeared in the BBC drama True Dare Kiss. Kirwan appeared as the villain Miss Mercy Hartigan in The Next Doctor, the 2008 Christmas special of Doctor Who.

In 2009, Kirwan was in the BBC drama Moving On, in the episode "Dress To Impress". She guest-starred in Law & Order: UK, playing the role of Beatrice McArdle. Kirwan appeared in the BBC drama series Material Girl, which aired in January 2010. She was cast in the role of Bundle in Agatha Christie's Marple. Kirwan appeared in the four-part BBC drama The Silence in 2010. She played the role of Maggie, the warm-hearted aunt of a young deaf girl who witnessed a murder. In 2011, Kirwan starred as Jane Travers, wife of the main character Will Travers, in Injustice, a five-part psychological thriller on ITV, written by Anthony Horowitz. In June 2012, Kirwan appeared as Alex Demoys in the three-part BBC1 drama miniseries Blackout. In 2018, she guest-starred in one episode of Sky's Strike Back: Retribution. She played Rachel Sheridan, who helped design Guantanamo and may have built the black site where a jihadi leader was being held. In the same year, Kirwan appeared in the ITV drama Strangers (originally titled White Dragon) in which she played the deceased wife of the titular character Jonah Mulray.

In 2019, she appeared as a guest star in the long-running BBC series Silent Witness, playing the role of pathologist Amanda Long. In 2020, she appeared in Netflix miniseries The Stranger as Corinne Price.

In 2020, Kirwan began work on the Irish thriller series Smother, for RTÉ Television. Production began in early 2020 but was halted in mid-March, due to the introduction of COVID-19 restrictions in Ireland. It recommenced in August 2020 and finished in late October. The series debuted on RTÉ One and RTÉ Player in early March 2021. The series was broadcast in the UK on Alibi in autumn 2021.

=== Stage ===
At the age of sixteen, Kirwan moved to London when she was cast in a play at the Bush Theatre. She won acclaim in 1988 for her performance as the factory girl Linda in A Handful of Stars, the Bush Theatre premiere of the first play in Billy Roche's Wexford Trilogy. In 1992, again at the Bush, she starred in a revival of the complete trilogy. In 1991, she appeared in the play Water Music at the Cockpit Theatre, written by award-winning playwright Lyndon Morgans (singer-songwriter with the Welsh folk noir band Songdog). In 1992, she starred in Hush by April De Angelis at the Royal Court Theatre, while January 1994 found her playing in Peter Hall's seasonal production of Georges Feydeau's farce An Absolute Turkey at the Globe Theatre.

In 2001, she appeared in a stage production of Dangerous Corner by JB Priestley in Leeds alongside Rupert Penry-Jones, to whom she is now married. Kirwan again appeared on stage with Penry-Jones in Les Liaisons Dangereuses at the Bristol Old Vic directed by Samuel West in 2003. In 2005, she appeared on the Lyttelton stage at the National Theatre in the role of Alice in Brian Friel's Aristocrats. In 2006, she played Bertha in Exiles at the National Theatre. In 2007, she appeared on stage in Harold Pinter's Betrayal at the Donmar Warehouse.

From April to May 2012, Kirwan appeared on stage at the Chichester Festival Theatre in a Jeremy Herrin production of Uncle Vanya. Kirwan played Sonya alongside an exceptional cast which included Roger Allam (as Vanya), Timothy West and Lara Pulver. The play received warm reviews and response to Kirwan's performance was generally positive. In April 2013, Kirwan was cast as Valerie in Josie Rourke's revival of The Weir by Conor McPherson at the Donmar Warehouse. Kirwan appeared alongside Brian Cox, Ardal O'Hanlon, Risteard Cooper and Peter McDonald. Critics lauded the play and gave it four- and five-star ratings. The Weir later transferred to the West End, playing at Wyndham's Theatre from January 2014 to April 2014. In 2014, Kirwan made her second stint at the Chichester Festival Theatre as Frankie in Frankie and Johnny in the Clair de Lune, a play by Terrence McNally about the relationship between waitress, Frankie and short-order cook, Johnny played by Neil Stuke. It was warmly received by critics who gave mostly four-star reviews. It ran from November 2014 to December 2014 at the Minerva theatre.

She appeared on stage in the Chichester Festival Theatre production of King Lear in 2017, directed by Jonathan Munby, where she played Goneril to Ian McKellen's Lear.

=== Film ===
In 1998, she starred alongside Christopher Eccleston in the Michael Winterbottom film With or Without You as Belfast girl Rosie Boyd. In 2004, Kirwan starred in School for Seduction. In 2009, Kirwan appeared in the Irish film Ondine alongside Colin Farrell and Stephen Rea. She played Maura, the alcoholic bitter ex-girlfriend of Farrell's character, Syracuse.

In 2007, Kirwan began filming the fantasy film Luna by Dave McKean, starring alongside Ben Daniels, Stephanie Leonidas and Michael Maloney. However, due to budget setbacks, filming did not resume until 2011 and was finally completed in 2013. It premiered at the Toronto International Film Festival in 2014. The film was positively received by critics and Kirwan's performance was highly praised. Luna was awarded the Best British Film at the 2014 Raindance Film Festival.

She starred in an independent thriller, Entity as Ruth Peacock. The film premiered in 2013 at selected cinemas and DVD and won Best Horror film at the London Independent Film Festival 2013. In 2016, she starred as the violent and cruel crime boss Ed in Branko Tomović's directorial debut Red. In 2017, Kirwan appeared in the film Interlude in Prague, taking on the role of Frau Lubtak alongside Adrian Edmondson and Morfydd Clark.

=== Other ===
In 1997, Kirwan sang with Dustin the Turkey on his cover of "Fairytale of New York" for his album Faith of Our Feathers. She provided the voiceovers for the "This is not just food" television advertising campaign for UK retailer Marks & Spencer and a string of three UK public information films about good food hygiene for the Food Standards Agency.

== Personal life ==
In 2007, Kirwan married actor Rupert Penry-Jones after a four-year engagement. They have two children. They met in 2001 while working on stage together in a West Yorkshire Playhouse, Leeds, production of JB Priestley's Dangerous Corner, when he played Robert Caplan to her Olwen Peel. Kirwan again appeared on stage with Penry-Jones in Les Liaisons Dangereuses in 2003. They both appeared in the television show Casanova in 2005, although they did not share any scenes.

== Filmography ==
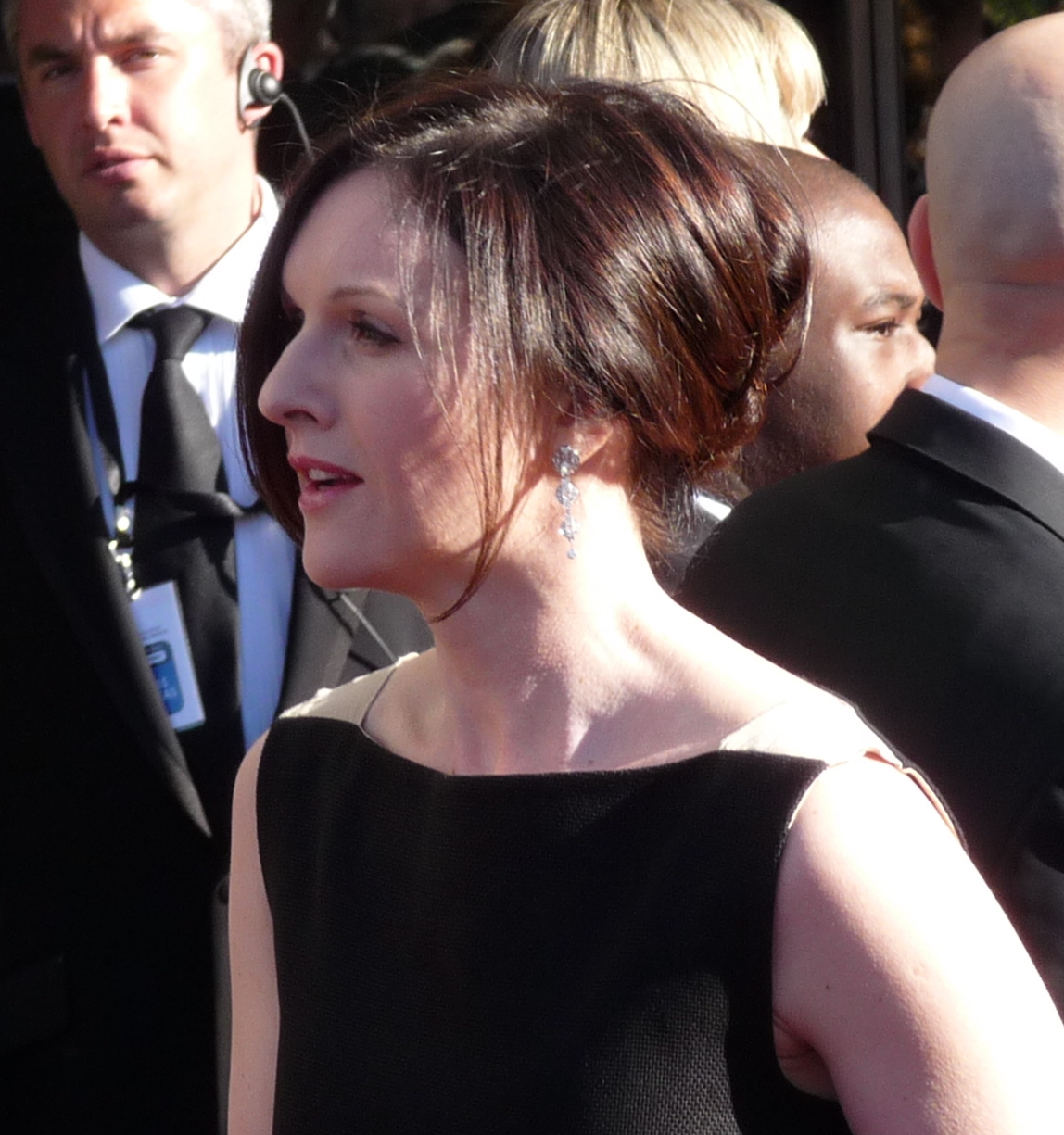
Kirwan at the 2009 BAFTAs

=== Film ===
Year	Title	Role	Notes
1986	The Fantasist	Fiona	
1990	December Bride	Young Martha	
1994	War of the Buttons	Marie	Voice role
1998	Pete's Meteor	Carmel	
1999	With or Without You	Rosie Boyd	
2000	Bee Stung Wasp		Short film
2004	School for Seduction	Clare	
2007	Dangerous Parking	Mum	
2009	Ondine	Maura	
2010	When the Rain Comes	Anna	Short film
2012	Entity	Ruth Peacock	
2014	Luna	Christine	Short film
2015	Silent Hours	DI Jane Ambrose	
2016	Red	Ed	Short film
2017	Interlude in Prague	Frau Lubtak	
2018	The Keeper	Clarice Friar	
2021	Last Call	Leticia	Voice role

=== Television ===
Year	Title	Role	Notes
1988	Troubles	Viola O'Neill	2 episodes
1990	Casualty	Anna	Episode: "Penalty"
1990	The Lilac Bus	Celia	Television film
1991	4 Play	Morna	Episode: "In the Border Country"
1992	A Time to Dance	Bernadette Kennedy	Miniseries
1993	A Handful of Star		Television film
1993	Poor Beast in the Rain	Eileen	Television film
1993–1996	Goodnight Sweetheart	Phoebe Sparrow / Bamford	Main role (series 1–3)
1996	Father Ted	Assumpta Fitzgerald	Christmas Special: A Christmassy Ted
1996–1998	Ballykissangel	Assumpta Fitzgerald	Main role (series 1–3)
1997	The Vicar of Dibley	Assumpta Fitzgerald	Comic Relief special
1997	Mr White Goes to Westminster	The Ferret	Television film
1999	The Dark Room	Jinx	2 episodes
1999	Eureka Street	Aoirghe	Miniseries
1999	The Flint Street Nativity	Jaye Dackers / Angel Gabriel	Television film
1999	The Greatest Store in the World	Mum	Television film
2000	Happy Birthday Shakespeare	Kate Green	Television film
2000–2001	Hearts and Bones	Emma Rose	Main role
2001	The Bombmaker	Andrea Hayes	2-part drama
2001	Shades	Maeve Sullivan	Miniseries
2001	Randall & Hopkirk (Deceased)	Petra Winters	Episode: "Painkillers"
2002	Dalziel and Pascoe	Rye Pomona	2 episodes
2003	A Tale of Two Good Wives	Charlie Goodman	Television film
2004	The Deputy	Terri Leonard	Television film
2004–2005	55 Degrees North	Claire Maxwell	Main role
2005	Casanova	Mother	1 episode
2007	True Dare Kiss	Phil Tyler	Main role
2008	Doctor Who	Miss Hartigan	Christmas special: "The Next Doctor"
2009	Moving On	Laura	Episode: "Dress to Impress"
2009	Law & Order: UK	Beatrice McArdle	2 episodes
2010	Material Girl	Davina Bailey	Main role
2010	Agatha Christie's Marple	Bundle	Episode: "The Secret of Chimneys"
2010	The Silence	Maggie Edwards	Miniseries
2011	Injustice	Jane Travers	Miniseries
2012	Blackout	Alex Demoys	Miniseries
2017	Safe House	Elizabeth Ellroy	2 episodes
2018	Strike Back	Rachel Sheridan	2 episodes
2018	Strangers	Megan Emilia Harris	Also known as White Dragon; main role
2019	Silent Witness	Amanda Long	2 episodes
2020	The Stranger	Corinne Price	Main role
2021–2023	Smother	Val Ahern	Main role
2022	The Reunion	Annabelle Degalais	Miniseries
2024	True Detective	Kate McKitterick	Recurring role
2025	House of Guinness	Aunt Agnes Guinness	

== Awards and nominations ==
Year	Award	Category	Work	Result	Ref.
1996	National Television Awards	Most Popular Actress	Ballykissangel	Won	
1997	Irish Post Awards	Best Irish Entertainer	Ballykissangel	Won	
1998	National Television Awards	Most Popular Actress	Ballykissangel	Nominated	
2010	Irish Film & Television Awards	Supporting Actress – Film	Ondine	Won	
2010	Crime Thriller Awards	Best Supporting Actress	The Silence	Won	
2011	Irish Film & Television Awards	Supporting Actress – Television	The Silence	Nominated	
2013	London Independent Film Festival	Best Sci-Fi / Horror Feature	Entity	Won	(Note: Shared with cast and crew.)
2013	London Independent Film Festival	Best Low Budget Film	Entity	Won	(Note: Shared with cast and crew.)
2016	Maverick Movie Awards	Best Supporting Actress: Short	Red	Nominated	
2016	Maverick Movie Awards	Best Ensemble Acting: Short	Red	Nominated	
2017	Flagship City International Film Festival	Best Actress	Red	Won	
2021	Irish Film & Television Awards	Lead Actress – Drama	Smother	Won	
2022	Irish Film & Television Awards	Lead Actress – Drama	Smother	Nominated	
2023	Irish Film & Television Awards	Lead Actress – Drama	Smother	Nominated	
