= Hard Landing (novel) =

2004 novel by Stephen Leather

- First edition
- Author: Stephen Leather
- Language: English
- Series: Dan ‘Spider’ Shepherd
- Genre: Thriller
- Publisher: Hodder & Stoughton
- Publication date: 2004
- Publication place: United Kingdom
- Media type: Print
- Pages: 384

Hard Landing is a 2004 thriller novel by British author Stephen Leather. Published in 2004 by Hodder & Stoughton, it is the first book in the Dan ‘Spider’ Shepherd series. Hard Landing is an international bestseller and is available in ebook and paperback.

== History ==
Stephen Leather, a former journalist, spent time in Belmarsh Prison in South London and in Durham Prison to research for Hard Landing. He learned about the high security accommodations, daily regimes, and the special supervision processes for disruptive inmates. In 2004, Hodder & Stoughton published the original version of the novel in hardback and paperback. In 2010, Hodder & Stoughton released the Kindle version of Hard Landing. The novel is popular in prisons.

Hard Landing has been translated into over ten languages.

== Plot ==
Hard Landing is about an elite undercover cop, Dan ‘Spider’ Shepherd, assigned to foil an imprisoned, ruthless UK drug dealer, Gerald Carpenter, who has threatened witnesses, destroyed evidence, and murdered police to regain his freedom. Shepherd goes undercover in a high-security prison to learn how Carpenter is orchestrating his plans through contacts around the world. Shepherd's mission is to find Carpenter’s contacts and stop them before they destroy the case and murder Shepherd's family.

== Awards and recognition ==
- In 2004, the Crime Writer’s Association nominated Hard Landing for the Ian Fleming Steel Dagger for best adventure/thriller novel.
- In 2011, Hard Landing was the fourth best-selling e-book in the U.K.
