= Stephen Leather =

British author (born 1956)

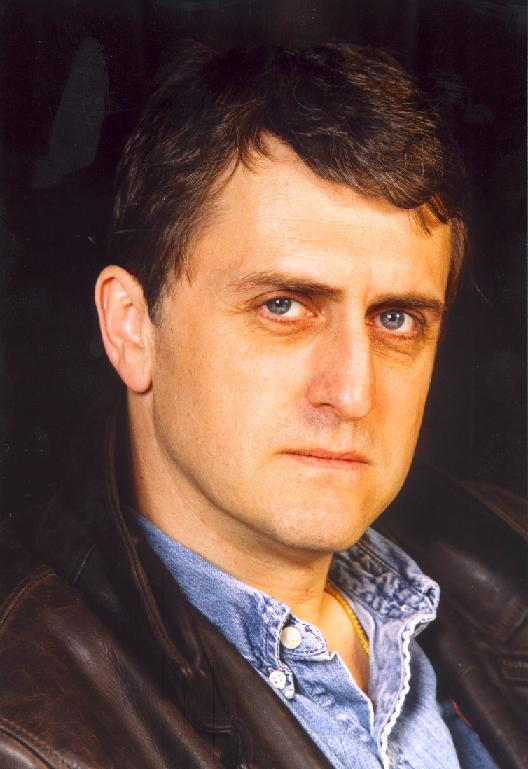
- Leather in 2012
- Born: 25 October 1956 (age 70); Manchester, Lancashire, England
- Education: University of Bath (BSc)
- Occupation: Author
- Years active: 1987–present
- Known for: Thriller books: Dan Shepherd Mystery and Nightingale Series
- Website: Official website

Stephen Leather (born 25 October 1956) is a British thriller author whose works are published by Hodder & Stoughton. He has written for television shows such as London's Burning, The Knock, and the BBC's Murder in Mind series. He is one of the top selling Amazon Kindle authors, the second bestselling UK author worldwide on Kindle in 2011.

== Biography ==
=== Early life ===
Leather was born in Manchester. He grew up in Sale and Chorlton-cum-Hardy, and attended Manchester Grammar School. He attended Bath University, where he obtained a BSc in Biochemistry in 1980.

=== Early career ===
Leather was employed as a biochemist for ICI, shovelled limestone in a quarry, worked as a baker, a petrol pump attendant, a barman, and worked for the Inland Revenue. He began his writing career as a journalist, working for newspapers such the Glasgow Herald, Daily Mirror, The Times, Daily Mail, and the South China Morning Post in Hong Kong.

=== Writing career ===
Leather began writing when he was in college; however, he "never managed to get beyond a few pages," and did not begin writing full-time until he had worked as a journalist for more than ten years.

His first novel, Pay Off, was written while he was still employed at The Daily Mirror. It was published from the "slush pile" at HarperCollins. The novel is a thriller about a merchant banker who takes revenge on two gangsters who killed his father. The book is set in Scotland, where Leather worked for five years on The Glasgow Herald as a business writer.

His second novel, The Fireman, was written while he was working as the business editor of the South China Morning Post. In The Fireman, a British tabloid journalist travels to Hong Kong to discover why his sister committed suicide. Both novels, and his third, Hungry Ghost, were published by HarperCollins.

Leather wrote his fourth novel, The Chinaman, while working as night news editor on the business desk of The Times in London. At the time, the Provisional Irish Republican Army's bombing campaign was at its height, and in The Chinaman, a Sino-Vietnamese man loses his family in an attack loosely based on the bombing of the Harrods department store in London. Having been turned away by the authorities, the man, a highly decorated Special Forces fighter in the Vietnam War, travels to Ireland and hunts down the people responsible. The book was used as the basis for the 2017 thriller The Foreigner.

=== Published works ===
Leather's novels frequently include themes of crime, imprisonment, military service, and terrorism. Settings are typically London and the Far East. Leather writes different series in slightly different genres. The main character of one series, Dan 'Spider' Shepherd, is a former Special Air Service soldier who becomes an undercover policeman. Another series, Jack Nightingale, is about a former police negotiator who becomes a private investigator; this supernatural detective series is also published by Hodder & Stoughton and includes the books Nightfall, Midnight, Nightmare, Nightshade and Lastnight, San Francisco, New York Night, Tennessee Night, The Whisper Man, Witch Hunt, New Orleans Night, Las Vegas Night, Rio Grande Night.

Leather has written screenplays for London's Burning, The Knock, and the BBC's Murder in Mind series. Two of his novels, The Stretch and The Bombmaker, were screened for made for TV movies and filmed for Sky Television. The Stretch starred Leslie Grantham and Anita Dobson, two popular soap opera stars from the U.K.

==== Amazon Kindle releases ====
Leather became successful in the Amazon Kindle market in 2010. Amazon UK opened an eBook store that year. As reported in The Guardian, Leather anticipated that people buying eBooks would be seeking bargains, and he priced his books at the minimum price for independent writers in order to get his books into the top ten. He then marketed the books on various forums online.

Early in 2011, Leather's books The Basement, Hard Landing, and the vampire novella Once Bitten occupied the top three places in the UK Kindle bestseller list, a feat matched only by Stieg Larsson with his The Girl with the Dragon Tattoo trilogy. That same year, Leather was the second bestselling UK author on the Kindle worldwide, beaten only by Lee Child.

== Awards and recognition ==
In 2002, Leather's book Tango One was nominated for the inaugural CWA Ian Fleming Steel Dagger, awarded by the Crime Writers' Association. His book Hard Landing was nominated for the award in 2004.

His book Cold Kill was nominated for Best Novel in 2007 by International Thriller Writers Inc. In 2011, Leather sold over 500,000 eBooks and was voted by The Bookseller magazine as one of the 100 most influential people in the UK publishing world.

== 2012 Harrogate Crime Writing Festival ==
On 5 August 2012, journalist Nick Cohen wrote in The Observer that Leather had created phony Twitter accounts in the name of another writer, and used those accounts to praise Leather's own books. Cohen quoted Leather's response to a question, as a panelist, at the Harrogate Crime Writing Festival, which was recorded for BBC Radio 4:

"As soon as my book is out I'm on Facebook and Twitter several times a day talking about it. I'll go on to several forums, the well-known forums, and post there under my name and under various other names and various other characters. You build up this whole network of characters who talk about your books and sometimes have conversations with yourself."

Leather's comment was widely reported, and, on 3 September 2012, forty nine other British authors issued a group statement in which they "unreservedly condemn" the use of sockpuppets, or paid reviews.

Jeremy Duns and Steve Mosby have alleged that Leather has harassed them online.

== Bibliography ==
=== Novels ===
| Publication year | Title | Series | Original publisher | ISBN | Notes |
|---|---|---|---|---|---|
| 1987 | Pay Off | | St. Martin's Press | ISBN 0312014872 | Hardcover (1988), Paperback (2002), Audio Book (2011), and eBook (2009) |
| 1989 | The Fireman | | St. Martin's Press | ISBN 0312038313 | Hardcover (1990), Paperback (1996), Audio Book (2011), and eBook (2008) |
| 1991 | Hungry Ghost | | HarperCollins | ISBN 0002236370 | Hardcover (1991), Paperback (2008), Audio Book (2008), and eBook (2008) |
| 1992 | The Chinaman | Mike Cramer #1 | Pocket Books | ISBN 0671743015 | Hardcover (1992), Paperback (1992), Audio Book (2007), and eBook (2008). Also published as The Foreigner (2017) |
| 1992 | The Double Tap | Mike Cramer #3 | Hodder & Stoughton | ISBN 9780340628393 | Hardcover (1996), Paperback (1997), and Audio Book (2006) |
| 1993 | The Vets | | Pocket Books | ISBN 0671743031 | Hardcover (1993), Paperback (1994), and eBook (2004) |
| 1994 | The Long Shot | Mike Cramer #2 | Hodder & Stoughton | ISBN 9780340632376 | eBook (2009) |
| 1996 | The Birthday Girl | | Hodder & Stoughton | ISBN 0340632364 | Hardcover (1995), Paperback (2006), Audio Book (2007), and eBook |
| 1997 | The Solitary Man | | Ulverscroft | ISBN 0340628375 | Hardcover (2004), Paperback (1997), and Audio Book (2010) |
| 1997 | The Tunnel Rats | | Ulverscroft | ISBN 0753170655 | Hardcover (2004), Paperback (2006), Audio Book (2009), and eBook (2009) |
| 1999 | The Bombmaker | | Hodder & Stoughton | ISBN 0340689552 | Hardcover (1999), Paperback (2005), Audio Book (2003), and eBook (2009) |
| 2000 | The Stretch | | Hodder & Stoughton | ISBN 0340770325 | Hardcover (2000), Paperback (2001), Audio Book (2001), and eBook (2009) |
| 2002 | Tango One | | Hodder & Stoughton | ISBN 0340770341 | Hardcover (2002), Paperback (2006), Audio Book (2004), and eBook (2009) |
| 2003 | The Eyewitness | | Hodder & Stoughton | ISBN 034082400X | Hardcover (2003), Paperback (2003), Audio Book (2004), and eBook (2008) |
| 2005 | Private Dancer | | Three Elephants | ISBN 9810539169 | Paperback and eBook |
| 2006 | Confessions of a Bangkok Private Eye | | Monsoon Books | ISBN 981054832X | With Warren Olson |
| 2010 | Dreamer's Cat | | Three Elephants | ASIN B00486U6VU | eBook |
| 2010 | The Basement | | Amazon Encore | ISBN 1612181481 | Paperback (2011), Audio Book (2012), and eBook (2011) |
| 2011 | Once Bitten | | Amazon Encore | ISBN 1455871702 | Paperback (2011), Audio Book (2012), and eBook (2011) |
| 2011 | Bangkok Bob and The Missing Mormon | | Monsoon Books | ISBN 9810877765 | Paperback (2011) and eBook (2010) |
| 2016 | First Response | | Hodder & Stoughton | ISBN 978-1473604605 | Hardcover (2016), and eBook (2016) |
| 2018 | The Shout | | Hodder & Stoughton | ISBN 978-1473671782 | |
| 2019 | The Bag Carrier | | Independently published | ISBN 978-1794095274 | |
| 2019 | Rogue Warrior | | | ASIN B07XQ3M13B | Novella |
| 2020 | The Runner | | Hodder & Stoughton | ISBN 978-1529345155 | |

=== Dan 'Spider' Shepherd Novels ===
| Publication year | Title | Series | Original publisher | ISBN | Notes |
|---|---|---|---|---|---|
| 2004 | Hard Landing | Dan 'Spider' Shepherd #1 | Hodder & Stoughton | ISBN 0340734116 | Hardcover, Paperback, Audio Book, and eBook |
| 2005 | Soft Target | Dan 'Spider' Shepherd #2 | Hodder & Stoughton | ISBN 0340834072 | Hardcover (2005), Paperback (2005), Audio Book (2005), and eBook (2008) |
| 2006 | Cold Kill | Dan 'Spider' Shepherd #3 | Hodder & Stoughton | ISBN 0340834102 | Hardcover, Paperback, Audio Book, and eBook |
| 2007 | Hot Blood | Dan 'Spider' Shepherd #4 | Hodder & Stoughton | ISBN 0340921692 | Paperback and eBook |
| 2008 | Dead Men | Dan 'Spider' Shepherd #5 | Hodder & Stoughton | ISBN 0340921706 | Hardcover (2008), Paperback (2008), Audio Book (2008), and eBook (2008) |
| 2009 | Live Fire | Dan 'Spider' Shepherd #6 | Hodder & Stoughton | ISBN 0340921730 | Hardcover (2009), Paperback (2010), Audio Book (2009), and eBook (2009) |
| 2010 | Rough Justice | Dan 'Spider' Shepherd #7 | Hodder & Stoughton | ISBN 0340924934 | Hardcover (2010), Paperback (2010), Audio Book (2010), and eBook (2010) |
| 2011 | Fair Game | Dan 'Spider' Shepherd #8 | Hodder & Stoughton | ISBN 0340924969 | Hardcover (2012), Paperback (2012), Audio Book (2011), and eBook (2012) |
| 2012 | False Friends | Dan 'Spider' Shepherd #9 | Hodder & Stoughton | ISBN 1444736779 | |
| 2013 | True Colours | Dan 'Spider' Shepherd #10 | Hodder & Stoughton | ISBN 978-1444736564 | |
| 2014 | White Lies | Dan 'Spider' Shepherd #11 | Hodder & Stoughton | ISBN 978-1444736588 | Hardcover (2014), and eBook (2014) |
| 2015 | Black Ops | Dan 'Spider' Shepherd #12 | Hodder & Stoughton | ISBN 978-1444736656 | Hardcover (2015), and eBook (2015) |
| 2016 | Dark Forces | Dan 'Spider' Shepherd #13 | Hodder & Stoughton | ISBN 978-1473604063 | Hardcover (2016), and eBook (2016) |
| 2016 | The Sandpit | Dan 'Spider' Shepherd: SAS #1 | CreateSpace | ISBN 978-1532959394 | Novella |
| 2017 | Light Touch | Dan 'Spider' Shepherd #14 | Hodder & Stoughton | ISBN 978-1473604131 | |
| 2018 | Tall Order | Dan 'Spider' Shepherd #15 | Hodder & Stoughton | ISBN 978-1473604179 | |
| 2018 | Moving Targets | Dan 'Spider' Shepherd: SAS #2 | CreateSpace | ISBN 978-1985232051 | |
| 2019 | Short Range | Dan 'Spider' Shepherd #16 | Hodder & Stoughton | ISBN 978-1473671928 | |
| 2020 | Slow Burn | Dan 'Spider' Shepherd #17 | Hodder & Stoughton | ISBN 978-1473671973 | |
| 2021 | Fast Track | Dan 'Spider' Shepherd #18 | Hodder & Stoughton | ISBN 978-1473672031 | Hardcover, Paperback, and eBook |
| 2021 | Russian Roulette | Dan 'Spider' Shepherd: SAS #3 | | ISBN 979-8748541510 | |
| 2022 | Dirty War | Dan 'Spider' Shepherd #19 | Hodder & Stoughton | ISBN 978-1529367409 | Hardcover, Paperback, and eBook |
| 2022 | Drop Zone | Dan 'Spider' Shepherd: SAS #4 | | ISBN 979-8664535594 | |
| 2023 | Clean Kill | Dan 'Spider' Shepherd #20 | Hodder & Stoughton | ISBN 978-1529367423 | Hardcover, Paperback, and eBook |
| 2024 | First Strike | Dan 'Spider' Shepherd #21 | | ISBN 979-8329422894 | Hardcover, Paperback, and eBook |
| 2024 | Baltic Black Ops | Dan 'Spider' Shepherd: SAS #5 | | ISBN 979-8860492264 | |

=== Jack Nightingale Novels ===
| Publication year | Title | Series | Original publisher | ISBN | Notes |
|---|---|---|---|---|---|
| 2010 | Nightfall | Jack Nightingale #1 | Isis Large Print | ISBN 1612182291 | Hardcover, Paperback, Audio Book, and eBook (2012) |
| 2011 | Midnight | Jack Nightingale #2 | Hodder & Stoughton | ISBN 1444700669 | Hardcover (2011), Paperback (2012), Audio Book (2012), and eBook (2012) |
| 2012 | Nightmare | Jack Nightingale #3 | Hodder & Stoughton | ISBN 1455866792 | Hardcover (2012), Paperback (2012), Audio Book (2012), and eBook (2012) |
| 2013 | Nightshade | Jack Nightingale #4 | Hodder & Stoughton | ISBN 9781444740684 | Hardcover (2013), Paperback (2013), Audio Book (2013), and eBook (2013) |
| 2014 | Lastnight | Jack Nightingale #5 | Hodder & Stoughton | ISBN 1444742655 | Hardcover (2014), and eBook (2014) |
| 2014 | San Francisco Night | Jack Nightingale #6 | Three Elephants | ISBN 978-0-9566203-9-2 | Hardcover (2015), and eBook (2014) |
| 2015 | New York Night | Jack Nightingale #7 | Three Elephants | ISBN 978-0956620378 | Hardcover (2015), and eBook (2015) |
| 2018 | Tennessee Night | Jack Nightingale #8 | Independently published | ISBN 978-1717751133 | Paperback (2018), and eBook (2018) |
| 2021 | New Orleans Night | Jack Nightingale #9 | | ISBN 979-8524367082 | Paperback, and eBook |
| 2022 | Las Vegas Night | Jack Nightingale #10 | | ISBN 979-8816697385 | Paperback, and eBook |
| 2022 | Rio Grande Night | Jack Nightingale #11 | | ISBN 979-8363325410 | Paperback, and eBook |

=== Lex Harper Novels ===
| Date | Show title | Notes | | | |
|---|---|---|---|---|---|
| 2016 | Takedown | Lex Harper #1 | Hodder & Stoughton | ISBN 978-1473605596 | Hardcover (2017), and eBook (2017) |
| 2019 | Plausible Deniability | Lex Harper #2 | Independently published | ISBN 978-1075865565 | Novella |

=== Matt Standing Novels ===
| Publication year | Title | Series | Original publisher | ISBN | Notes |
|---|---|---|---|---|---|
| 2018 | Last Man Standing | Matt Standing #1 | Hodder & Stoughton | ISBN 978-1473671867 | |
| 2022 | Standing Alone | Matt Standing #2 | | | |
| 2023 | Still Standing | Matt Standing #3 | | | |
| 2024 | Standing Strong | Matt Standing #4 | | | |

=== Inspector Zhang Short stories ===
| Publication year | Title | Series | Collection | Notes |
|---|---|---|---|---|
| 2011 | "Inspector Zhang Gets His Wish" | Inspector Zhang #1 | The Eight Curious Cases of Inspector Zhang (2014) | Novella |
| 2011 | "Inspector Zhang and the Falling Woman" | Inspector Zhang #2 | The Eight Curious Cases of Inspector Zhang (2014) | Novella |
| 2011 | "Inspector Zhang and the Dead Thai Gangster" | Inspector Zhang #3 | The Eight Curious Cases of Inspector Zhang (2014) | Novella |
| 2011 | "Inspector Zhang and the Disappearing Drugs" | Inspector Zhang #4 | The Eight Curious Cases of Inspector Zhang (2014) | Novella |
| 2012 | "Inspector Zhang and the Perfect Alibi" | Inspector Zhang #5 | The Eight Curious Cases of Inspector Zhang (2014) | Novella |
| 2012 | "Breaking" | Inspector Zhang #6.1 | Short Fuses (2012) | |
| 2012 | "Strangers on a Train" | Inspector Zhang #6.2 | Short Fuses (2012) | |
| 2012 | "Inspector Zhang and the Hotel Guest" | Inspector Zhang #6.3 | Short Fuses (2012), The Eight Curious Cases of Inspector Zhang (2014) | |
| 2012 | "Cat's Eyes" | Inspector Zhang #6.4 | Short Fuses (2012) | |
| 2012 | "Inspector Zhang Goes To Harrogate" | Inspector Zhang #7 | The Eight Curious Cases of Inspector Zhang (2014) | Novella |
| 2013 | "Inspector Zhang and the Island of the Dead" | Inspector Zhang #8 | The Eight Curious Cases of Inspector Zhang (2014) | Novella |

=== Dan 'Spider' Shepherd Short Stories ===
| Publication year | Title | Series | Collection | Notes |
|---|---|---|---|---|
| 2012 | "Friendly Fire" | Dan 'Spider' Shepherd | Spider Shepherd Short Stories (2013), Spider Shepherd: SAS: Volume 2 (2014) | |
| 2012 | "Dead Drop" | Dan 'Spider' Shepherd | Spider Shepherd Short Stories (2013), Spider Shepherd: SAS: Volume 2 (2014) | |
| 2013 | "Hard Evidence" | Dan 'Spider' Shepherd | Spiders Web (2013) | |
| 2013 | "Hiatus" | Dan 'Spider' Shepherd | Spiders Web (2013) | |
| 2013 | "Hard Targets" | Dan 'Spider' Shepherd | Spiders Web (2013), Spider Shepherd: SAS: Volume 1 (2014) | |
| 2013 | "Kill Zone" | Dan 'Spider' Shepherd | Spider Shepherd Short Stories (2013), Spider Shepherd: SAS: Volume 2 (2014) | |
| 2013 | "Natural Selection" | Dan 'Spider' Shepherd: SAS | Spider Shepherd: SAS: Volume 1 (2014) | |
| 2013 | "Warning Order" | Dan 'Spider' Shepherd: SAS | Spider Shepherd: SAS: Volume 1 (2014) | |
| 2013 | "Hostile Territory" | Dan 'Spider' Shepherd: SAS | Spider Shepherd: SAS: Volume 1 (2014) | |
| 2013 | "Rough Diamonds" | Dan 'Spider' Shepherd: SAS | Spider Shepherd: SAS: Volume 1 (2014) | |
| 2014 | "Narrow Escape" | Dan 'Spider' Shepherd: SAS | Spider Shepherd: SAS: Volume 1 (2014) | |
| 2014 | "Personal Protection" | Dan 'Spider' Shepherd: SAS | Spider Shepherd: SAS: Volume 2 (2014) | |
| 2014 | "The Rope" | Dan 'Spider' Shepherd: SAS | Spider Shepherd: SAS: Volume 2 (2014) | |
| 2014 | "Planning Pack" | Dan 'Spider' Shepherd: SAS | Spider Shepherd: SAS: Volume 2 (2014) | |
| 2014 | "Remote Control" | Dan 'Spider' Shepherd | | |

=== Jack Nightingale Short Stories ===
| Publication year | Title | Series | Collection | Notes |
|---|---|---|---|---|
| 2011 | "Cursed" | Jack Nightingale #1.5 | Nightingale - A Short Story Collection (2017) | |
| 2012 | "Still Bleeding" | Jack Nightingale #4.4 | Nightingale - A Short Story Collection (2017) | |
| 2014 | "My Name Is Lydia" | Jack Nightingale #2.5 | Nightingale - A Short Story Collection (2017) | |
| 2014 | "Blood Bath" | Jack Nightingale #4.5 | Nightingale - A Short Story Collection (2017) | |
| 2014 | "Tracks" | Jack Nightingale #5.5 | Nightingale - A Short Story Collection (2017) | |
| 2015 | "I Know Who Did It" | Jack Nightingale #4.6 | Nightingale - A Short Story Collection (2017) | |
| 2015 | "The Whisper Man" | Jack Nightingale | | Novella |
| 2016 | "Children of the Dark" | Jack Nightingale #5.6 | Nightingale - A Short Story Collection (2017) | |
| 2017 | "The Cards" | Jack Nightingale #3.5 | Nightingale 2 - A Short Story Collection (2018) | |
| 2017 | "The Creeper" | Jack Nightingale #5.7 | Nightingale - A Short Story Collection (2017) | |
| 2017 | "The Asylum" | Jack Nightingale #5.8 | Nightingale 2 - A Short Story Collection (2018) | |
| 2017 | "The Undead" | Jack Nightingale #5.9 | Nightingale - A Short Story Collection (2017) | |
| 2017 | "The Doll" | Jack Nightingale #5.10 | Nightingale 2 - A Short Story Collection (2018) | |
| 2017 | "The Mansion" | Jack Nightingale #5.11 | Nightingale 2 - A Short Story Collection (2018) | |
| 2017 | "Possession" | Jack Nightingale #5.12 | Nightingale 2 - A Short Story Collection (2018) | |
| 2017 | "Devilzone - A Jack Nightingale Screenplay" | Jack Nightingale | | |
| 2017 | "Wrong Turn" | Jack Nightingale | Nightingale 2 - A Short Story Collection (2018) | |
| 2018 | "The House on Gable Street" | Jack Nightingale | | |
| 2018 | "Knock Knock" | Jack Nightingale | Nightingale 2 - A Short Story Collection (2018) | |
| 2018 | "Watery Grave" | Jack Nightingale | Nightingale 2 - A Short Story Collection (2018) | |
| 2018 | "Claws" | Jack Nightingale | Nightingale 2 - A Short Story Collection (2018) | |

=== Others Stories ===
| Publication year | Title | Series | ASIN | Notes |
|---|---|---|---|---|
| 2012 | Banging Bill's Wife | Asian heat #1 | ASIN : B007R5LPYQ | |
| 2012 | The Alphabet Game | Asian heat #2 | ASIN : B0085BEJMG | |
| 2012 | The Pregnant Wife | Asian heat #3 | ASIN : B0089G45Q2 | |
| 2012 | The Threesome | Erotic short story | ASIN : B00AD6NOGI | |

=== Screenplays ===
| Date | Show title | Notes |
|---|---|---|
| 2001–2003 | Murder in Mind | Wrote two of the first series episode (2001) and two episodes of the second series (2002). Also wrote an episode for the 2003 series. |
| 2000 | The Bombmaker | Made for TV movie based on the book written by Leather |
| 2000 | The Knock (Series 5) | Episode 2. 90-minute special |
| 2000 | The Stretch | Made for TV movie based on the book written by Leather. Movie created, written, and produced by Leather |
| 1999 | London's Burning | Episode 9 & 10. Screened March 2000 |
| 1998 | The Knock (Series 4) | Episode 4, 5, and 6. Screened in 1999 |

== Adaptations ==
- The Stretch (2000), mini-series directed by Frank W. Smith, based on novel The Stretch
- The Bombmaker (2001), mini-series directed by Graham Theakston, based on novel The Bombmaker
- The Foreigner (2017), film directed by Martin Campbell, based on novel The Chinaman
- Tango One (2018), film directed by Sacha Bennett and Helena Holmes, based on novel Tango One
