= The Chinaman (novel) =

1992 novel by Stephen Leather

- First edition
- Author: Stephen Leather
- Language: English
- Genre: Thriller
- Publisher: Hodder & Stoughton
- Publication date: 1992
- Publication place: United Kingdom
- Media type: Print
- Pages: 320
- ISBN: 978-0671743017
- Preceded by: Hungry Ghost
- Followed by: The Vets

The Chinaman is a thriller novel written by Stephen Leather, first published in 1992. It is Leather's fourth novel. Its plot concerns a London-based Vietnamese restaurateur and skilled Vietnam War veteran who travels to Ireland to hunt the people responsible for a bombing that killed his family.

The book was adapted into The Foreigner, a 2017 feature film, starring Jackie Chan and Pierce Brosnan.

== Plot ==
Nguyen Ngoc Minh is a Vietnamese restaurateur based in London. He is also a Vietnam War veteran who was trained as an assassin by both the Viet Cong and the US Army. One day, his wife and daughter are killed in a bombing by the Irish Republican Army (IRA).

Nguyen seeks justice, first by going to London Chief Inspector Richard Bromley, who is investigating the bombings, but he rebuffs Nguyen. In the meantime, a rogue cell of IRA continues to commit bombings throughout London. Ian "Woody" Wood, a freelance journalist, is assigned to investigate the IRA. He is approached by the desperate Nguyen, who offers him money for the names of the bombers. Lacking any information, Woody suggests that Nguyen talk to Sinn Féin member and former IRA operator Liam Hennessey. Nguyen sells his restaurant to his best friend and decides to travel to Belfast to talk to Hennessey.

Hennessey has his former weapon dumps investigated, believing a rogue cell is using Semtex from those dumps to create the explosives, but when confronted by Nguyen, he claims ignorance of the bombers' identities. Nguyen reacts to this by setting off a homemade bomb in the bathroom of Hennessey's office. By phone, Nguyen threatens further reprisals if he is not given the names of the bombers.

Hennessey, secretly having ordered the bombings to boost his political needs, is in fact enraged that civilians were killed and that the bombings came without warnings. He summons Sean Morrison, his associate in the United States, to travel to London to talk to Bromley about a plan to take down the bombers. Morrison tells Bromley about their plan, of which only the two of them will have knowledge.

Nguyen sets off bombs on Hennessey's farm, prompting him to send his wife Mary (who is secretly having an affair with Sean) to London. Hennessey sends men after Nguyen, who is positioned in the forest surrounding the farm. As Nguyen is lethally skilled in jungle warfare, he disables Hennessey's men with traps and fights them before escaping into the forest.

When another bombing occurs, Hennessey's plan fails to identify the bombers. Elsewhere, Woody is writing about his meeting with Nguyen. Maggie, a member of the rogue cell, seduces Woody in order to plant a bomb on his laptop without his knowledge before he flies to a press conference.

Desperate to neutralize Nguyen, Hennessey hires a tracker named Kerry, who is the daughter of his close friend and former IRA associate Micky Geraghty. Hennessey discovers that the mastermind behind the bombings is his political enforcer Hugh McGrath. He also discovers Sean and Mary's affair, deducing that Mary and McGrath were responsible for the rogue cell, but decides to let Morrison off the hook to help in hunting down Nguyen.

Morrison and Hennessey interrogate McGrath for the names of the bombers before executing him. In flashback, the story reveals that Nguyen fought for the Viet Cong during the Vietnam War before joining the United States Army, which trained him in unarmed combat and jungle warfare. He was refused asylum in America before deciding to escape to Hong Kong, witnessing his eldest daughters raped and killed by Thai pirates.

Morrison, Kerry, and Hennesey's right-hand man Kavanaugh hunt for Nguyen, but during this effort Kavanagh and three other enforcers are killed by Nguyen. Nguyen confronts Kerry and Sean, the latter of which stops the former from shooting him (since he spared her life when he had an earlier opportunity to kill her) and gives up of the bombers location and names to Nguyen.

Hennessey gives the identities of the bombers to Bromley. A Special Air Service (SAS) team led by The Colonel and an operative codenamed Joker converge on the apartment building in which the bombers are residing. Nguyen manages to enter first, disguised as a delivery man, and he ambushes the bombers.

At the airport, Woody boards the plane, not knowing about the bomb in his laptop. The SAS team bursts into the apartment and guns down everyone, including Nguyen, though not Maggie. They fail to stop the bomb in time, which detonates, killing Woody and everyone aboard. Bromley, wanting no loose ends, has Maggie executed.

During a meeting about taking down the IRA, Hennessey and Morrison's names are mentioned. Bromley decides not to mention Nguyen, knowing the life and death of the Chinaman will always be a mystery.

== Film adaptation ==
On 5 June 2015, it was announced that Jackie Chan would star in a feature film adaptation of the novel, titled The Foreigner. Directed by Martin Campbell, the film also stars Pierce Brosnan. It was distributed by STX Entertainment.

There were several changes made to the book's plot in the film adaptation. First of all, the main protagonist's name was changed to "Ngoc Minh Quan", and only his youngest daughter Fan was killed in the bombing, while Quan's wife died giving birth to Fan before the events of the novel. Commander Bromley was shown to be more polite and sympathetic in the film when Quan met him and sought his help to pursue justice for his daughter. The Quan family fled from Vietnam to Singapore before relocating to Britain instead of the United States and Hong Kong en route, although Quan's two oldest daughters were also murdered during the journey by Thai pirates like in the novel. Also, the bombing of the plane was averted due to timely intervention and discovery of the plan, saving the life of reporter Ian Wood and other passengers. Unlike the novel, Quan did not die alongside the terrorists from the police shooting, as he escapes before the police's arrival and at the end of the film, he survives and reunited with his longtime partner Lam at his restaurant after avenging his daughter.
