= Brendan Coyle =

British and Irish actor (born 1962)

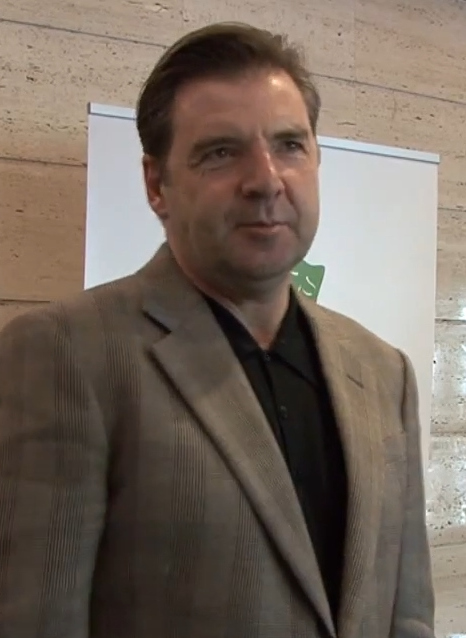
- Coyle in June 2012
- Born: David Coyle; 2 December 1962 (age 63); Corby, Northamptonshire, England
- Occupation: Actor
- Years active: 1992–present
- Relatives: Matt Busby (great-uncle)

Brendan Coyle (born 2 December 1962) is a British-Irish actor. He won the Olivier Award for Best Performance in a Supporting Role for The Weir in 1999. He also played Nicholas Higgins in the miniseries North & South, Robert Timmins in the first three series of Lark Rise to Candleford, and more recently Mr Bates, the valet, in Downton Abbey, which earned him a nomination for a Primetime Emmy Award for Outstanding Supporting Actor in a Drama Series and a BAFTA nomination for Best Supporting Actor.

== Early life ==
Brendan Coyle was born David Coyle in Corby, Northamptonshire, on 2 December 1962, the son of a Patrick B. Coyle and Bedelia M. B. Anderson. He has an older brother, Shaun. Due to his British birth and Irish heritage (through his father), he holds both British and Irish citizenship. He is the great-nephew of football manager Sir Matt Busby. He studied drama in Dublin in 1981 and received a scholarship to Mountview Academy of Theatre Arts in London in 1983.

== Career ==
Coyle received a Laurence Olivier Award in 1999 for his performance in Conor McPherson's The Weir and won a New York Critics Theater World Award for Outstanding Broadway Debut for the same play in its New York production. In 2001, Coyle appeared in the film Conspiracy as Gestapo Chief Heinrich Müller. He played Kaz Sweeney in the British drama True Dare Kiss, and Nicholas Higgins in North & South for the BBC.

From 2008 he played Robert Timmins in three BBC series based on the Lark Rise to Candleford novels, written by Flora Thompson. In 2010, he began playing John Bates, valet and former British Army batman to the Earl of Grantham in Julian Fellowes's period drama series, Downton Abbey. Fellowes wrote the part for Coyle, and it won him nominations for a BAFTA and IFTA, as well as a nomination for the Primetime Emmy Awards as Outstanding Supporting Actor in a Drama Series in 2012. He also won three Screen Actors Guild Awards 2013–16. Coyle also played the character of Terry Starling in the short-lived Sky comedy series Starlings.

== Personal life ==
Coyle divides his time between London and Norfolk. He is a fan of the football team Manchester United FC, which was managed by his great-uncle Matt Busby.

== Filmography ==
=== Film ===
Year	Title	Role	Notes	Ref.
1994	Ailsa	Miles Butler		1995 The glass virgin Manuel Mendoza
1997	The Last Bus Home	Steve Burkett		
1997	The Cull		Short film	
1997	Tomorrow Never Dies	Leading Seaman – HMS Bedford		
1998	The General	UVF Leader		
1998	Soft Sand, Blue Sea	Gerry		
1998	Happy Birthday to Me		Short film	
1999	I Could Read the Sky	Francie		
2001	Mapmaker	Robert Bates		
2005	The Jacket	Damon		
2005	Allegiance	Michael Collins		
2006	Offside	Duncan Miller		
2007	Alice in the City	Mr. Sinclair	Short film	
2009	Perrier's Bounty	Jerome		
2012	The Raven	Reagan		
2014	Noble	Gerry Shaw		
2014	The Tea Break	Bob	Short film	
2016	Me Before You	Bernard Clark		
2016	Unless	Casper Brown		
2016	Bare	Mick 'The Irish Hammer'	Short film	
2018	Mary Queen of Scots	Earl of Lennox		
2019	Downton Abbey	John Bates		
2022	Downton Abbey: A New Era	John Bates		
2025	Downton Abbey: The Grand Finale	John Bates		

=== Television ===
Year	Title	Role	Notes
1990	London Calling	Kevin Cahill	Television film
1990	He-Play	Mike	Episode: "The Loser"
1992	The Bill	Chris Bailey	Episode: "Radio Waves"
1992	Fool's Gold: The Story of the Brink's-Mat Robbery	Det. Sgt. Benwell	Television film
1995	The Glass Virgin	Manuel Mendoza	Mini-series (3 episodes)
1995	Dangerfield	David Walsh	2 episodes: "Victim of Rape: Parts 1 & 2"
1995–1996	Thief Takers	DS/DI Bob 'Bingo' Tate	Series 1 & 2 (17 episodes)
1996	Silent Witness	Liam Slattery	2 episodes: "Darkness Visible: Parts 1 & 2"
2000	McCready and Daughter	Donal McCready	Television film (pilot for series)
2000	Paths to Freedom	Jeremy Fitzgerald	6 episodes
2001	Rebel Heart	Michael Collins	Mini-series (4 episodes)
2001	The Inspector Lynley Mysteries	Richard Tey	Episode: "A Great Deliverance"
2001	The Bombmaker	George McEvoy	2-part drama
2001	Conspiracy	SS Maj Gen Heinrich Müller	Television film
2001	McCready and Daughter	Donal McCready	5 episodes
2002–2003	Rockface	Douglas McLanaghan	Series 1 & 2 (14 episodes)
2003	Waking the Dead	Martin Corgan	2 episodes: "Multistorey: Parts 1 & 2"
2003	Single	Paul Barton	6 episodes
2004	Amnesia	DC Ian Reid	Mini-series (2 episodes)
2004	Omagh	Det. Sgt. John White	Television film
2004	North & South	Nicholas Higgins	Mini-series (4 episodes)
2005	Shameless	Father Polish	Episode: "The Big Day"
2005	Jericho	Christie	Mini-series (3 episodes)
2005	The Ghost Squad	Sgt. Ralph Allan	Episode: "Heroes"
2006	The Commander: Blacklight	Carl Dirkwood	Television film
2006	New Tricks	Hanson Henchman with Short Hair	Episode: "Congratulations" (uncredited role)
2006	Soundproof	DI Dave Cox	Television film
2006	Prime Suspect: The Final Act	DCS Mitchell	Mini-series (2 episodes)
2006	Perfect Parents	Ed	Television films
2007	The Mark of Cain	Davey Gulliver	Television films
2007	Wedding Belles	Father Henry	Television films
2007	The Good Samaritan	Lewis Farrell	Television films
2007	Damage	Aidan Cahill	Television films
2007	True Dare Kiss	Kaz Sweeney	6 episodes
2008–2010	Lark Rise to Candleford	Robert Timmins	Series 1–3 (31 episodes)
2009	Inspector George Gently	Patrick Donovan	Episode: "Gently in the Night"
2009	Blue Murder	Derek Jowell	2 episodes: "Private Sins: Parts 1 & 2"
2010–2015	Downton Abbey	John Bates	Series 1–6 (52 episodes); Screen Actors Guild Award for Outstanding Performance by an Ensemble in a Drama Series; Nominated – BAFTA Television Award for Best Supporting Actor; Nominated – Primetime Emmy Award for Outstanding Supporting Actor in a Drama Series (2012)
2012–2013	Starlings	Terry Starling	Series 1 & 2 (16 episodes)
2013	Common Ground	DCI Cockburn	Episode: "Sunshine Simon"
2015	Spotless	Nelson Clay	10 episodes
2015	Murdoch Mysteries	Mr. Rankin	Episode: "A Merry Murdoch Christmas"
2016	12 Monkeys	Dr. Benjamin Kalman	Episode: "Year of the Monkey"
2018	Requiem	Stephen Kendrick	Mini-series (6 episodes)
2022	Riches	Gideon Havelock	6 episodes
2024	Finders Keepers	Denys Elland	Mini-series (1 episode)
2025	Toxic Town	Roy Thomas	Mini-series (4 episodes)
2026	Hit Point	TBA	Upcoming thriller

== Anderson Shelter Productions ==
In July 2014, Brendan Coyle and Joy Harrison formed Anderson Shelter Productions Limited with the mission to "find talented young filmmakers" and assist in funding their short film projects. On 14 September 2014, Coyle announced via Twitter his involvement with Council Child Production's short film, Starcross.

#	Title	Release date	Notes	Ref.
1	Starcross (short film, Council Child Productions)	2014	Associate Producer	
2	The Loneliest Time (short film, Time Bomb Pictures Ltd.)	2015	Associate Producer	
3	Bare (short film, Council Child Productions)	2016	Executive Producer	
3	Margie's Garden (short film, Council Child Productions)	2016	Executive Producer	
4	Emerald City (feature film, Colin Broderick)	2016	Associate Producer	
