= The Foreigner (2017 film) =

Film by Martin Campbell

- Theatrical release poster
- Directed by: Martin Campbell
- Screenplay by: David Marconi
- Based on: The Chinaman by Stephen Leather
- Produced by: Jackie Chan; Wayne Marc Godfrey; Arthur Sarkissian; Qi Jian Hong; Claire Kupchak; John Zeng; Scott Lumpkin; Jamie Marshall; Cathy Schulman
- Starring: Jackie Chan; Pierce Brosnan
- Cinematography: David Tattersall
- Edited by: Angela M. Catanzaro
- Music by: Cliff Martinez
- Production companies: STXfilms; Sparkle Roll Media; Wanda Pictures; H. Brothers; TMP; Jackie and J J; The Fyzz Facility; Orange Corp.
- Distributed by: Wuzhou Film Distribution (China); STX Entertainment (United States); Netflix (United Kingdom)
- Release dates: 24 September 2017 (Beijing); 30 September 2017 (China); 13 October 2017 (United States); 15 December 2017 (United Kingdom)
- Running time: 114 minutes
- Countries: United Kingdom; China; United States
- Language: English
- Budget: $35 million
- Box office: $145.4 million

The Foreigner is a 2017 action thriller film directed by Martin Campbell from a screenplay by David Marconi, based on the 1992 novel The Chinaman by Stephen Leather. A British-Chinese-American co-production, starring Jackie Chan, Pierce Brosnan, Michael McElhatton, Liu Tao, Charlie Murphy, Orla Brady, and Katie Leung. The film follows a London-based Chinese Nùng restaurateur and ex-soldier who seeks vengeance for the death of his daughter.

The Foreigner was released in China on 30 September 2017 by Wuzhou Film Distribution, in the United States on 13 October 2017 by STX Entertainment, and in the United Kingdom on 15 December 2017 on Netflix. It received mixed reviews from critics with praise for its action sequences, musical score, and against type performances of Chan and Brosnan, but criticized its formulaic plot. The film grossed $145 million at the worldwide box office and was one of 2018's top ten most-watched Netflix original films in the UK.

== Plot ==
Ngoc Minh Quan, a Chinese-Vietnamese-British widower, Vietnam War veteran, and former special forces operator, runs a Chinese restaurant in London. He lost two daughters to pirates when he escaped Vietnam, and his wife died when his daughter, Fan, was born. Fan and 11 other people are killed in a terrorist bombing in Knightsbridge; an IRA splinter group dubbing itself the "Authentic IRA" claims responsibility. Quan visits Scotland Yard daily for information and offers Commander Bromley £20,000 for the names of the bombers. Though sympathetic, Bromley tells him that he is hindering the investigation. Quan leaves the restaurant with his friend and partner, Lam. Later, Quan travels to Belfast and meets deputy First Minister of Northern Ireland and Sinn Féin political advisor Liam Hennessy, a former Provisional IRA leader who has renounced violence. Quan demands the names of the bombers, but Hennessy denies any knowledge, so Quan sets off a homemade bomb in Hennessy's building and leaves a fake explosive on Hennessy's car as a warning.

Hennessy orders IRA weapons dumps searched for missing Semtex and tells his right-hand enforcer, Jim Kavanagh, to get Quan out of the city. Hennessy's men track Quan, but he fights them off and escapes. Later, Quan photographs Hennessy kissing his mistress, Maggie Dunn, and threatens to blackmail him. Hennessy enlists his nephew Sean Morrison, a former Royal Irish Regiment soldier and skilled tracker, to meet with Bromley. Morrison tells Bromley that each IRA cell will change code words to identify the rogue bombers; Bromley agrees to assist on condition that the British take them out, not the IRA. Quan follows Hennessy to his farmhouse and attacks it with more bombs. As Hennessy's men search for him, Quan maims them with traps before he is wounded by Kavanagh, forcing him to flee. Hennessy's former IRA commander, Hugh McGrath, confronts him about the searches, accusing Hennessy of caring more about his position within the British government than the IRA's cause. Soon after, Quan also confronts Hennessy, threatening him and giving him 24 hours to reveal the names of the bombers. A double-decker bus is blown up in London, killing 16 more people, but no code word is given, creating distrust between Hennessy and Bromley. Afterwards, Bromley notifies Hennessy that they have discovered the bomber's identity and tracked McGrath to his farm. Bromley threatens to raid the farm unless Hennessy forces McGrath to reveal who and where the terrorists are. Hennessy tortures McGrath and gets the names, including his mistress Maggie, whose real name is Sara McKay.

Hennessy learns that his own wife, Mary, masterminded the attacks because her brother was murdered by a UVF death squad. She hates both the British and her husband for allowing his killers to be incarcerated rather than executed. Hennessy kills McGrath and shares the information with Morrison. Morrison finds Quan's hideout, but Quan subdues him and gets the names of the killers and their location. After Morrison is released and returns to the farm, Hennessy reprimands him for unintentionally leaking information to Mary, with whom he is having an affair, and orders him to bury McGrath's body. Quan enters the bombers' London flat disguised as a gasman. He kills all of them except Sara, who is wounded in the scuffle. Quan escapes just before MI5 and SO15 storms the flat. They torture Sara into disclosing the location of the next bomb, which is planted in a reporter's laptop to be detonated on a plane carrying British dignitaries to a conference. Airport police locate the reporter and throw the laptop into an air bridge, which explodes without any casualties. McKay is executed to tie up loose ends.

British cabinet minister Katherine Davies, who was scheduled to be on the targeted flight, calls Hennessy to tell him she knows of his involvement, but having helped prevent the attack, he can remain as deputy First Minister, albeit under her control. Meanwhile, Morrison kills Mary, effectively eliminating the terrorist cell. Quan confronts Hennessy with a picture showing him kissing Maggie. He forces Hennessy to post the photo online, publicizing his links to the terrorists. Quan returns to the restaurant and reunites with Lam. Realizing Quan's role, Bromley decides not to take further action against Quan and keeps him under surveillance for the time being.

== Cast ==
- Jackie Chan as Quan Ngoc Minh
- Pierce Brosnan as Liam Hennessy
- Orla Brady as Mary Hennessy, Liam's wife
- Dermot Crowley as Hugh McGrath, former IRA commander
- Ray Fearon as Commander Richard Bromley who investigates the bombings
- Rory Fleck Byrne as Sean Morrison, Liam Hennessy's entrusted Nephew
- Michael McElhatton as Jim Kavanagh, Liam Hennessy's right hand man
- Charlie Murphy as Maggie Dunn / Sara McKay, Liam Hennessy's mistress
- Liu Tao as Lam
- Lia Williams as Katherine Davies, Cabinet Minister
- Caolán Byrne as McCormick
- John Cronin as Denis Fisher
- Stephen Hogan as Christy Murphy
- Rufus Jones as Ian Wood
- Katie Leung as Fan
- Niall McNamee as Patrick O'Reilly
- Aaron Monaghan as Pat Nugent
- David Pearse as Billy McMahon

== Production ==
On 5 June 2015 it was announced that Jackie Chan would star in the action thriller film The Foreigner, for STX Entertainment, and based on Stephen Leather's novel The Chinaman. Nick Cassavetes initially signed to direct the film, which was adapted from Leather's novel by David Marconi, while Wayne Marc Godfrey was one of the producers. The film is partially set in Walworth, London. On 15 July 2015, Deadline reported that Martin Campbell was instead in talks to direct the film, while Relativity Media would finance. Campbell was paid $2 million for the film. Pierce Brosnan joined the cast alongside Chan in November. Brosnan previously starred in the 1995 film GoldenEye directed by Campbell. Co-stars Liu Tao and Chan attended the Shanghai Film Festival on 11 June 2016 to promote the film.

Principal photography commenced in January 2016. The filming in London of a scene involving the explosion of a bus on Lambeth Bridge caused some alarm, as people were not aware that it was a stunt. Scenes were shot at the Walters & Cohen designed Regent High School in Camden and on Churton Street in Pimlico on 18 February 2016. Cliff Martinez composed the score.

== Release ==
The Foreigner was released theatrically in China on 30 September 2017 by Wuzhou Film Distribution and in the United States on 13 October 2017 by STX Entertainment. In the Philippines, the film was distributed by Viva International Pictures on 18 October 2017.

=== Box office ===
The Foreigner grossed $34.4 million in the United States and Canada, and $111 million in other countries for a worldwide total of $145.4 million, against a production budget of $35 million. In the United States and Canada, the film opened alongside Happy Death Day, Marshall and Professor Marston and the Wonder Women, and was expected to gross $10–15 million from 2,555 theaters in its opening weekend. It made $4.8 million on its first day, including $855,000 from Thursday night previews. It went on to open to $15.5 million, finishing third at the box office behind Happy Death Day and Blade Runner 2049.

=== Home media ===
In the United Kingdom, the film was released on 15 December 2017 on Netflix. It became one of the UK's top ten most-watched Netflix original films of 2018, with a 0.37% share of the total Netflix content consumed in the UK that year. The film was released on DVD and Blu-ray in the United States on 9 January 2018 and in Canada and the rest of the world on 23 January. The film was released on DVD & Blu-Ray on 19 May 2025 in the United Kingdom.

=== Critical response ===
On the review aggregator website Rotten Tomatoes, the film holds an approval rating of 66% based on 127 reviews, with an average rating of 6/10. The website's critics' consensus reads, "The Foreigner adheres strictly to action thriller formula, but benefits from committed—and out of character—performances from its talented veteran stars." On Metacritic, the film has a weighted average score of 55 out of 100, based on 23 critics, indicating "mixed or average reviews". Audiences polled by CinemaScore gave the film an average grade of "A−" on an A+ to F scale, while PostTrak reported 78% of filmgoers gave it a positive score.

Peter Travers of Rolling Stone gave the film three out of four stars and praised Chan's performance, saying: "It's the most dramatic role Chan has ever tackled, and he plays it with coiled intensity and raw emotional power." Clarence Tsui of The Hollywood Reporter also praised Chan, writing, "It's good to see Chan swapping his happy-go-lucky persona for two hours for some gravitas as a tragic rogue with a marked past." John Berra of Screen Daily praised the action sequences, Cliff Martinez's score and the direction, stating "Campbell's unfussy style works well with Chan’s choreography. The star’s willingness to look at his 63 years makes the falls look like they hurt and creates a sense of jeopardy when Quan finds himself outnumbered." He also observed that the film "never commits the cinematic sin of suggesting that terrorism is a threat [that] can be readily dispatched with a few one-liners." Ignatiy Vishnevetsky for The A.V. Club described the film as "good, lean cut of meat—in other words, a typical Martin Campbell movie, expeditious and cold-blooded in its cross-cut, cloak-and-dagger plotting and violence." The Chicago Reader also commended the performances of Chan and Brosnan and called The Foreigner a "twisty, bracing political thriller, giving Chan room to display his dramatic ability." The Times of India gave a positive review of Campbell's direction and the film's suspense, stating that it can keep viewers "engrossed."

In more mixed reviews, Peter Debruge of Variety wrote "The Foreigner amounts to an above-average but largely by-the-numbers action movie in which Chan does battle with generic thugs and shadowy political forces." Glenn Kenny writing in The New York Times stated Chan "doesn’t deliver the action pizazz here that he used to," criticised the plot as "convoluted" and felt that the use of the IRA as antagonists were outdated about current events.

== Potential sequel ==
In January 2016, The New Yorker quoted Jackie Chan in conversation with then-STX chairman Adam Fogelson as having suggested that a female character in The Foreigner who had been killed off in the script had been kept alive so-as to "save her for No. 2. Now the IRA goes after her—and that's the story." On said meeting with Chan and the concept of The Foreigner No. 2 sequel, Fogelson then remarked, “A few years ago, thinking about the sequel that way would be characterized as a lazy, greedy bastardization of the creative process. If you said that now, you'd be telling the entire world that they're wrong. Sequels have become a duty—a form of storytelling that, thanks to great television, audiences have grown accustomed to. You can aspire to create six two-hour movies that develop your concept across multiple resolutions, which makes movies easier to sell and creates a more predictable business model. Half the films we'll say yes to will have sequelable potential."
