= The Weir =

1997 play by Conor McPherson

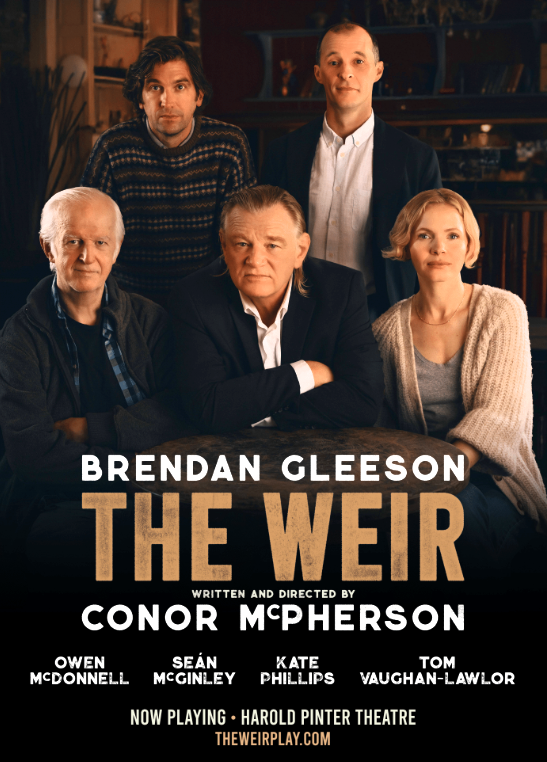
- Promotional poster for 2025 London revival
- Original language: English
- Written by: Conor McPherson
- Characters: Valerie; Finbar; Jack; Brendan; Jim
- Subject: A publican and three of his regulars attempt to spook a newcomer from Dublin but end up themselves frightened
- Genre: Drama
- Setting: A pub in County Leitrim, mid-1990s

Premiere
- Date: 1997
- Place: Royal Court Theatre Upstairs, London

The Weir is a play written by Conor McPherson in 1997. It was first produced at The Royal Court Theatre Upstairs in London, England, on 4 July 1997. It opened on Broadway at the Walter Kerr Theatre on 1 April 1999. As well as several other locations in the UK and the U.S., the play has been performed in Ireland, Germany, the Czech Republic, Slovenia, Australia and Canada.

== Plot summary ==
The play opens in a County Leitrim pub with Brendan, the publican, and Jack, a car mechanic and garage owner. These two begin to discuss their respective days and are soon joined by Jim. The three then discuss Valerie, a pretty young woman from Dublin who has just rented an old house in the area.

Finbar, a businessman, arrives with Valerie, and the play revolves around reminiscences and banter. After a few drinks, the group begin telling stories with a supernatural slant, related to their own experience or those of others in the area, and which arise out of the popular preoccupations of Irish folklore: ghosts, fairies and mysterious happenings.

After each man (except Brendan) has told a story, Valerie tells her own: the reason why she has left Dublin. Valerie's story is melancholy and undoubtedly true, with a ghostly twist which echoes the earlier tales, and shocks the men who become softer, kinder, and more real. There is the hint that the story may lead to salvation and, eventually, a happy ending for two of the characters. Finbar and Jim leave, and in the last part of the play, Jack's final monologue is a story of personal loss which, he comments, is at least not a ghostly tale but in some ways is nonetheless about a haunting.

The building of a hydroelectric dam, or weir, on a local waterway many years before is mentioned early in the conversation.

== Characters ==
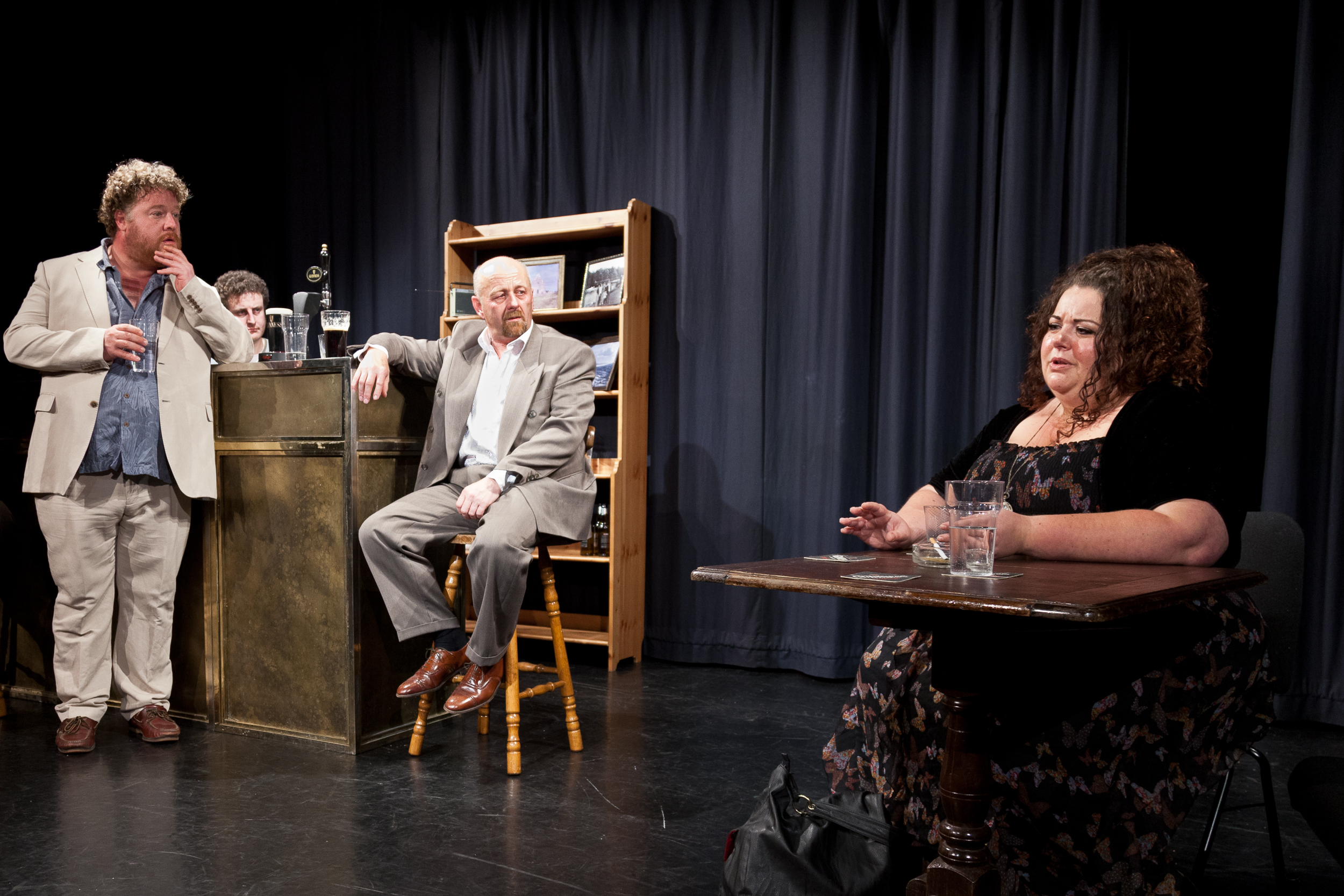
Valerie tells her tale in a 2011 production by OVO theatre company, St Albans, UK

- Jack, a mechanic and garage owner in his fifties.
- Brendan, the owner of the pub in which the play is set. He is in his thirties.
- Jim, Jack's assistant, in his forties.
- Finbar Mack, a local businessman in his late forties.
- Valerie, a Dublin woman in her thirties.

== Productions and cast ==
Royal Court Theatre Upstairs, UK (Original cast)

- Finbar, Dermot Crowley
- Jim, Kieran Ahern
- Jack, Jim Norton
- Brendan, Brendan Coyle
- Valerie, Michelle Fairley

National Theatre, Prague, Czech Republic (2000)

- Finbar, Václav Postránecký
- Jim, Jan Hartl
- Jack, Alois Švehlík
- Brendan, Alexej Pyško
- Valerie, Miluše Šplechtová

Ljubljana National Drama Theatre, Slovenia (performing continuously since April 2001)

- Finbar, Aleš Valič
- Jim, Igor Samobor
- Jack, Ivo Ban
- Brendan, Branko Šturbej
- Valerie, Saša Pavček

The Gate Theatre, Dublin (2008)

- Finbar - Denis Conway
- Jim - Mark Lambert
- Jack - Sean McGinley
- Brendan - David Ganly
- Valerie - Genevieve O'Reilly

Cape Ann Theatre Collaborative at Gloucester Stage Company, Gloucester, MA (2010)

- Michael McNamara
- Rory O’Conner
- David McCaleb
- Michael O’Leary
- Kristen Searcy

Irish Repertory Theatre, Off-Broadway (2013)

- Finbar, Sean Gormley
- Jim, John Keating
- Jack, Dan Butler
- Brendan, Billy Carter
- Valerie, Tessa Klein

Donmar Warehouse, London (2013 Revival)

- Finbar, Risteárd Cooper
- Jim, Ardal O'Hanlon
- Jack, Brian Cox
- Brendan, Peter McDonald
- Valerie, Dervla Kirwan

Rover Rep Theatre, Hamburg

- Finbar, Roger Graves
- Jim, Jeff Caster
- Jack, John Kirby
- Brendan, Dave Duke
- Valerie, Valerie Doyle

Melbourne Theatre Company, Melbourne, Australia (2015)

- Finbar, Greg Stone
- Jim, Robert Menzies
- Jack, Peter Kowitz
- Brendan, Ian Meadows
- Valerie, Nadine Garner

Abbey Theatre, Dublin (2022–2023)

- Finbar, Peter Coonan
- Jim, Marty Rea
- Jack, Brendan Coyle
- Brendan, Sean Fox
- Valerie, Jolly Abraham

Nantwich Players Theatre, Nantwich (2023)

- Jack, Don Hirst
- Brendan, Adam Goode
- Jim, Simon Porter
- Finbar, Chris Ridge
- Valerie, Megan Goode

Olympia Theatre, Dublin and Harold Pinter Theatre, London (2025 Revival)

- Finbar, Tom Vaughan-Lawlor
- Jim, Seán McGinley
- Jack, Brendan Gleeson
- Brendan, Owen McDonnell
- Valerie, Kate Phillips

== Critical response ==
Reviews of The Weir have been positive. It won the 1999 Laurence Olivier Award for Best New Play. In addition, McPherson won the Critics' Circle Award as the most promising playwright in 1998 as a direct result of the success of The Weir. The play has received lofty praise, such as "beautifully devious," "gentle, soft-spoken, delicately crafted work," and "this is my play of the decade...a modern masterpiece."

The Weir was voted one of the 100 most significant plays of the 20th century in a poll conducted by the Royal National Theatre, London. It tied at 40th place with Eugene O'Neill's The Iceman Cometh, Samuel Beckett's Endgame and Arthur Miller's A View From The Bridge. The Guardian critic Michael Billington listed The Weir as one of the 101 greatest plays of all time in his 2015 book The 101 Greatest Plays: From Antiquity to the Present.

=== Awards ===
- 1999 Laurence Olivier Award for Best New Play

== Adaptations ==
In February 2026, it was announced that principal photography had begun in Ireland on a feature film adaptation of the play, directed by the playwright and featuring the cast of the 2025 Dublin/London revival.
