= Branko Tomović =

German-Serbian actor (born 1980)

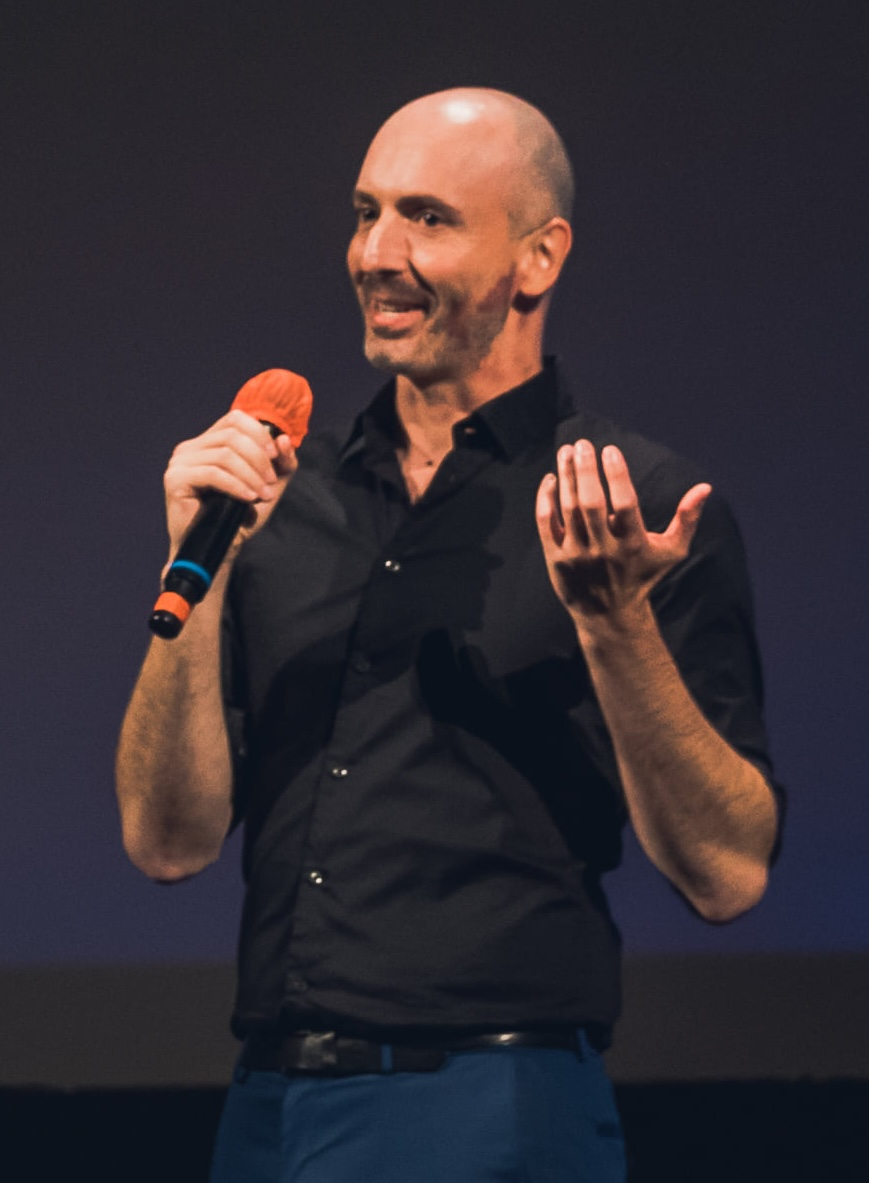
- Tomović in Red
- Born: June 17, 1980 (age 45); Münster, North Rhine-Westphalia, West Germany
- Occupation: Actor

Branko Tomović (Serbian: Бранко Томовић; born June 17, 1980) is a German-Serbian actor and filmmaker.

== Career ==
He was born in Münster, Germany, though his actual origin is from the Carpathians in Serbia. His parents emigrated in the '70s from the Golubac Fortress area on the Danube and Tomović was raised between Germany and Serbia before he studied acting at the prestigious Lee Strasberg Theatre Institute in New York City.

Tomović was first seen on the big screen in the lead role in the American Film Institute/Sundance drama Remote Control, for which he received the OmU-Award at the Potsdam Film Festival. Currently settled in London, with his dark, brooding looks he has appeared in striking roles on British Television. He played the creepy main suspect Antoni Pricha, the Morgue Man, in Jack the Ripper thriller Whitechapel, the pyromaniac Junky-Henchman Marek Lisowski in the final episodes of A Touch of Frost and Polish fighter pilot Miroslaw Feric in the World War II drama The Untold Battle of Britain. Tomovic has worked with internationally respected film directors as Ken Loach, Sönke Wortmann and Paul Greengrass.

He was named "One to Watch" by Moviescope Magazine in 2008 and recent film credits include The Bourne Ultimatum opposite Matt Damon (Dir. Paul Greengrass), It's a Free World... (Dir. Ken Loach), The Wolf Man (Dir. Joe Johnston), Pope Joan (Dir. Sönke Wortmann) and Interview with a Hitman (Dir. Perry Bhandal). In 2010, he won the 'Best Actor' Award at the San Francisco Short Film Festival and at The Accolade Film Awards for his performance as a Serbian soldier who is tormented by grief and guilt after being a witness of war crimes in the drama Inbetween.

He also stars opposite Debbie Harry in Jimmy Cauty's Road movie Believe the Magic and Steve Stone's ghost thriller Entity with Dervla Kirwan and Charlotte Riley. Entity won two awards at the London Independent Film Festival 2013 and Best Film at the British Horror Film Festival where Branko was also nominated for Best Actor. The British Filmmakers Alliance honoured him as Best International Actor for his role and he was also chosen as a Rising Star by Icon Magazine.

In 2014, he played Jack Bauer's right-hand man, the mysterious and dangerous Belcheck, next to Kiefer Sutherland in 24: Live Another Day. He was also seen in David Ayer's WWII drama Fury.

In 2016, Tomović made his directorial debut with Red, a short dark thriller set in the underground world of illegal organ trade. Branko stars in the lead role Niklas alongside Dervla Kirwan and Francesca Fowler. The film has won numerous awards and nominations on the international film festival circuit, incl. BAFTA and European Film Award qualifying festivals.

His second film as a writer/director, The Smell of Petrol, deals with human trafficking and the current refugee crisis. It world premiered at Oldenburg Film Festival in 2018 and won Best UK Short Film Special Mention at Winchester Film Festival and the Grand Prix Festival Award at Jahorina Film Festival and several selections and nominations at BFI Future Film, BAFTA and European Film Award qualifying festivals.

Tomović starred in the 2021 European arthouse horror film Vampir, which he also wrote and directed.

== Writer / Director ==
Tomović's short films as a writer/director (Red (2016 film), a dark thriller set in the underground world of illegal organ smuggling starring Dervla Kirwan, and The Smell of Petrol, which deals with human trafficking) have won numerous awards and nominations at major prestigious festivals, including qualifying festivals for Oscar, BAFTA and the European Film Awards.

His feature debut as a writer/director is the European arthouse horror film Vampir. It had the world premiere at Sigtes International Film Festival October 2021 in the New Visions competition, followed by the UK premiere at Raindance Film Festival and Trieste Science+Fiction where it was nominated for a Silver Melies Award as Best European Fantastic Film. Tomovic won the Oscull Award for his special contribution to film art at the Festival of Serbian Fantastic Film and was nominated for the German Cinema New Talent Award (Förderpreis Neues Deutsches Kino) as well as for the Hof Gold Prize (Hofer Goldpreis) at the prestigious 56th Hof International Film Festival in Germany.

== Awards ==
- Grenzland-Filmtage Selb 2023 - Winner Indie-Award for "VAMPIR"
- 56th Hof International Film Festival / Hofer Filmtage 2022 - Hof Gold Prize / Hofer Goldpreis Nomination for "VAMPIR"
- 56th Hof International Film Festival / Hofer Filmtage 2022 - German Cinema New Talent Award / Förderpreis Neues Deutsches Kino Nomination for "VAMPIR"
- Sitges International Film Festival 2021 - New Visions Award Nomination for "VAMPIR"
- Trieste Science+Fiction Festival 2021 - Silver Melies Award Nomination for Best European Film for "VAMPIR"
- Raindance Film Festival 2021 - Screamdance "VAMPIR"
- Festival of Serbian Fantastic Film 2021 - Winner Oscull Award for special contribution to film art for "VAMPIR"
- Unrestricted View Film Festival 2017 - Best Actor for "Red"
- Jim Thorpe Independent Film Festival 2017 Nomination - Best Actor for "Red"
- Flagship City International Film Festival 2017 Nomination - Best Actor for "Red"
- Maverick Movie Awards 2016 - Best Actor for "Red"
- Kraljevski Filmski Festival 2016 - Best Short Film for "Red"
- Naperville Independent Film Festival 2016 - Best Short Film Nomination for "Red"
- Icon Magazine 2013 - "Rising Star"
- British Horror Film Festival Award 2013 Nomination - Best Actor for "Entity"
- The British Filmmakers Alliance Award 2013 - Best International Actor for "Entity"
- Philadelphia Documentary & Fiction Film Festival 2011 - Best Actor for "The Crossmaker"
- Goldie Film Awards 2010 - Special Award for Best Actor for "The Crossmaker"
- San Francisco Short Film Festival Award 2010 - Best Actor for "Inbetween"
- The Accolade Film Awards 2010 - Best Leading Actor for "Inbetween"
- MovieScope Magazine 2008 - "One to Watch"
- Potsdam Film Festival 2002 - OmU-Award for "Remote Control"

== Filmography ==
- Killing Eve (2022)
- DEUS: The Dark Sphere (2022)
- Die Jägerin - Nach eigenem Gesetz (2021)
- Vampir (2021)
- Luna (2017)
- Red (2016)
- City of Tiny Lights (2016)
- 24: Live Another Day (2014)
- Fury (2014)
- Law and Order UK (2013)
- Silent Witness (2013) as Darek (episode: "Greater Love")
- Ein Fall für zwei – Adams Sünde (2013)
- Entity (2012)
- Believe the Magic (2012)
- Interview with a Hitman (2012)
- Strike Back (2011, TV)
- Coming Up - Home (2011, TV)
- Will (2011)
- Tatort (2011, TV)
- Polizeiruf 110 (2010, TV)
- The Untold Battle of Britain (2010, TV)
- A Touch of Frost (2010, TV)
- Pope Joan (2009)
- The Wolfman (2010)
- Whitechapel (2009, TV)
- Inbetween (2008)
- Into the Woods (2008)
- Taximan (2008)
- Casualty (2008, TV)
- The Bourne Ultimatum (2007)
- It's a Free World... (2007)
- The Bill (2007, TV)
- Amor Fati (2005)
- Dirty Seed (2005)
- Casualty (2005, TV)
- Siska (2003, TV)
- Bella Block (2002, TV)
- Remote Control (2001)
