= Straightheads =

- Film poster
- Directed by: Dan Reed
- Written by: Dan Reed
- Produced by: Damian Jones; Kevin Loader
- Starring: Gillian Anderson; Danny Dyer
- Cinematography: Chris Seager
- Edited by: Ewa J. Lind
- Music by: Ilan Eshkeri
- Production companies: DJ Films; Free Range Films; Verve Pictures; Ingenious Film Partners
- Distributed by: Verve Pictures
- Release date: 27 April 2007
- Running time: 80 minutes
- Country: United Kingdom
- Language: English

Straightheads (titled Closure in the United States) is a 2007 British revenge/thriller film, featuring brutal sexual violence, which follows a couple who seek revenge against a group of men. It was written and directed by Dan Reed, who made his directorial debut, and features Gillian Anderson and Danny Dyer.

The film went straight-to-video in the United States on 18 September 2007.

== Plot ==
Adam, a 23-year-old self-employed security technician, is hired by businesswoman Alice Comfort to set up a security system in her flat. After finishing the work, Adam falls asleep on her roof-garden. When Alice arrives home and finds him there, she impulsively asks him to accompany her to a housewarming party for her boss. He is unsure, but eventually agrees. Whilst at the party, Alice and Adam have passionate sex.

Driving home from the party Alice overtakes a slow-moving vehicle, while Adam shouts an obscenity at the driver. Shortly after, Alice accidentally hits a stag. While she and Adam are dragging the animal off the road, the car that Alice overtook earlier pulls up. Three men get out, who proceed to beat up Adam, who suffers an eye injury and extensive facial scarring, and proceed to gang-rape Alice, laughing as they do so.

A month passes, during which Adam and Alice physically improve but remain emotionally wounded. On returning to work, Alice receives notification that, while she was hospitalised following the assault, her father had died. Alice drives out to his country house to put his affairs in order, and discovers a locked chest that she recognises from her childhood. Driving home, she narrowly averts colliding with a group of horse riders, one of whom abuses her as a result, and she recognises as one of the rapists. She gets his name – Heffer – from another rider.

Alice contacts Adam, and he makes his way to her father's house where she tells him that she is found one of the men responsible for attacking them and knows where he lives as she followed him home. Alice shows Adam the contents of her father's locked chest: a sniper rifle and silencer that her father apparently smuggled home after being discharged from the army. Alice says that she intends to avenge herself against Heffer.

They stake out Heffer's home with the intent to kill him. Alice shoots their dog, an Alsatian, as it would never allow them near the house without barking. But a young woman (later identified as Heffer's daughter, Sophie) comes out of the house looking for the dog. Alice deliberately crosses paths with her and Sophie unhappily tells her the dog was the only thing making life bearable. Alice and Adam, disturbed by having to confront the fact that their attacker is a human being with a family, return home.

Over the next few days the couple try to decide if they should go ahead with their plan. Adam, who has been impotent since the attack, steadily becomes more aggressive and committed to the idea of murdering Heffer. Alice, while beginning to have second thoughts about it, sends Adam to set up security equipment in Heffer's house to try to determine the layout and activities of any occupants.

Adam succeeds in breaking into Heffer's house and ends up in Sophie's room after her father and friends return home unexpectedly; initially, he merely attempts to keep her quiet so that he can get out of the house, but he has a sudden fit of rage and begins raping her. In the middle of the attack, she escapes from his grasp. Adam returns home, able to maintain an erection for the first time since the attack. However, Alice fights him off when he becomes too violent.

The next day Alice uses a laptop computer that controls the security cameras and watches Heffer in his house. She realises his intention is to kill himself, and after grabbing her rifle rushes to his house. Alice finds Heffer in his garage, sitting in his car with the engine running and a hosepipe attached to the exhaust pipe. She gets him out of the car and into fresh air, saving his life. Heffer, who does not recognise Alice but thanks her for saving him, in remorseful mood now confesses that while out with his friends a month ago they had wanted to rape his daughter after picking her up walking by the road, but he wanted to distract them from that by committing the attack on the couple, confirming that he alone raped Alice after telling Sophie to leave.

Just then, Alice and Heffer hear Adam calling from outside, and Heffer suddenly turns violent, grabbing her roughly, but Alice hits him and frees herself. Adam then bursts into the house, beats Heffer, duct-tapes him to the kitchen table, and holds him down while Alice sodomises him with the barrel of the rifle that she has fetched from her car; once she is finished, she prepares to kill him, but – now pitying him because of the circumstances surrounding the rape – she decides not to pull the trigger. Adam, infuriated, takes out a hunting knife and carves out Heffer's eye, claiming "an eye for an eye". Horrified, Alice runs away; driving back to her father's home, Alice spots Sophie hitch-hiking, and invites her into her car. When Sophie realises she is not being taken home, she asks Alice where they are headed. Alice replies, "Somewhere safe."

Back at Heffer's house, Adam taunts Heffer until he hears a car pulling up; as one of the attackers approaches the house, Adam fatally shoots him in the head before pursuing the remaining attacker through the grounds. Adam shoots the man in the leg as he flees, causing him to fall to the ground. He then bludgeons the wounded man to death with the butt of the rifle.

In the final shot of the film, Adam walks away from his victim, tosses the rifle aside into some undergrowth, and approaches the screen for a close-up shot, looking directly at the camera. The viewer is left to reflect on the violent revenge that has just been exacted, and whether or not he kills Heffer.

== Cast ==
- Gillian Anderson as Alice Comfort
- Danny Dyer as Adam
- Adam Rayner as Jago
- Antony Byrne as Misha
- Anthony Calf as Heffer
- Ralph Brown as Jamie
- Steven Robertson as Bill
- Gugu Mbatha-Raw as PA
- Francesca Fowler as Sophie

== Critical reception ==
Rotten Tomatoes reported that 43% of 21 listed film critics gave the film a positive review. The film was negatively received by The Guardian reviewers Philip French and Steve Rose, as well as Donald Clarke of The Irish Times. Reviews by Empire and Digital Spy were mixed. Weird Wild Realm reviewer Paghat described the Closure title as banal and the film as a "cheesy British thriller", adding that in UK English, the term "straighthead" is slang for a gang member not ordinarily involved in committing crime.

== Home media ==
Ahead of its UK retail release, Straightheads became available on DVD for rental on 24 August 2007. It went on general retail release on 24 September 2007. Dan Reed reported in his blog that he, Anderson and Dyer recorded an audio commentary in December 2006. The commentary forms part of the special features for the Region 2 DVD, which also included deleted scenes with commentary (again by Reed, Anderson and Dyer), behind-the-scenes cast interviews, and the theatrical trailer.

For its US release, Straightheads was retitled Closure and released direct to DVD by Sony Pictures. As per the date reported by the website DVD Times, the Region 1 DVD was released on 18 September 2007.

A Blu-ray version of the film debuted in the UK in 2010. It contains a feature commentary, deleted scenes, and trailers. The disc is Region B-locked.

The film was released on Blu-ray in the US for the first time on 4 April 2017 by Mill Creek Entertainment. It is included as part of a 3-pack with Perfect Stranger (2007) and Wind Chill (2007).

The film is regularly screened on Channel 4 channels in the UK, always after the watershed.
