= Vampir (2021 film) =

2021 British-Serbian-German film

- Promotional movie poster
- Directed by: Branko Tomović
- Written by: Branko Tomović
- Produced by: Jean Louis-Alexandre; Branko Tomović; Miloš Z. Vučkoviić; Dina Vickermann
- Starring: Branko Tomović; Gorica Regodić; Joakim Tasić; Eva Ras
- Cinematography: Heath McWater
- Edited by: Abolfazl Talooni
- Music by: Mark Ashworth
- Production companies: Red Marked Film; Dinaric Alps Productions; Vickermann Films
- Release date: 13 October 2021 (Sitges)
- Running time: 95 minutes
- Countries: United Kingdom; Serbia; Germany
- Languages: English; Serbian

Vampir is a 2021 European arthouse horror film. It was premiered at the 2021 Sitges Film Festival.

== Plot ==
The story takes place in rural central Serbia, from where the vampire myth originates.

After witnessing a crime in London and looking for a place to hide for a while, Arnaut is offered a job by the charming yet ruthless local Vesna to look after a cemetery in a small remote village in Serbia. He soon starts to have nightmarish visions and is frequently visited by the mysterious older woman Baba Draga who guides him into the darkness. Only the village priest seems to be trying to keep him safe from the sinister intentions of the villagers.

== Cast ==
Branko Tomović	Arnaut
Gorica Regodić	Vesna
Joakim Tasić	Father Radosav
Eva Ras	Baba Draga
Judith Georgi	Biljana
Nemanja Bajić	Zoran
Zorica Krunić	Dragana
Dušan Jović	Taxi driver

== Production ==
The movie was set for production in June 2020, but it was postponed due to COVID-19 restrictions. Filming took place in September 2020.

The movie is a British-Serbian-German co-production.

It was shot in the municipality of Trstenik and it was the first time for Tomović to shoot in Serbia. Vampir is the first horror movie for the Yugoslav and Serbian actress Eva Ras.

== Director's statement ==
"Vampir is inspired by the real vampire cases that occurred in Serbia in the early 1700s. Those were the origins of vampires. Though our film is set in modern times it's based on those myths, superstitions and folk elements. I wanted to show a more mysterious side of Serbia."

The film also serves as an allegory of an immigrant child who was raised abroad and comes back to his ancestry's country, where he is confronted with the local habits, traditions and way of life which are hard to accept at first.
