= The Stretch (novel) =

2000 novel by Stephen Leather

- Author: Stephen Leather
- Language: English
- Genre: Thriller
- Publisher: Hodder & Stoughton
- Publication date: 2000
- Publication place: Great Britain
- Media type: Print
- Pages: 406
- Preceded by: The Bombmaker
- Followed by: Tango One

The Stretch is a thriller written by Stephen Leather, published in 2000. The novel, his twelfth, was based on the script for his television miniseries of the same name.

== History ==
Leather originally wrote The Stretch as a two-part miniseries for Sky One. Filmed in the United Kingdom and Spain in 1999, it aired in 2000. His previous television experience was writing for the program The Knock. Leather's editor at Hodder & Stoughton encouraged him to turn the screenplay into a book. The publication of the novel was timed to coincide with the TV broadcast.

== Novel ==
=== Publication ===
The Stretch was published by Hodder & Stoughton in hardcover in 2000, followed by a paperback edition in 2001.

=== Plot summary ===
Career criminal Terry Greene is sentenced to life in prison for the murder of low-level drug dealer Preston Snow. Greene, who claims to be innocent, wants his estranged wife, Samantha “Sam” Greene to take over his illegal activities, which include money counterfeiting and drug and alcohol trafficking. Terry had previously hidden his illegal activities from Sam. She believes him to be innocent, and testifies on his behalf at his trial. Sam and Terry have three children, one of whom, the teenaged Trisha, lives with Sam in London. After some initial hesitation, Sam agrees to do as her husband wishes, in order to replenish the family's weakened finances. With help from Terry's driver/bodyguard Andy McKinley, Sam quickly becomes a capable, respected crime boss. Detective Chief Inspector Frank Welch is out to nab Sam, who, along with her husband, insultingly refers to him as Raquel. After another prisoner, Sean Kelly, confesses to Snow's murder, Terry is released from prison. Sam is conflicted as to whether or not she can trust Terry after his years of infidelity and lying about his criminal activities. Despite her hesitations, she allows Terry to move back in. Meanwhile, their daughter, Laura, is being abused by her husband, Jonathan Nichols. Sam's threats to Jonathan do nothing to halt the abuse; later, Terry beats him up and threatens him with murder unless he leaves the country, which Nichols does.

As Welch continues to investigate the Greenes, Sam implores Terry to retire from the criminal world. Terry convinces her to assist him on a big heroin score, which he plans to bring in from Spain and sell to North London gangster and distributor Geoff Donovan for 10 million pounds. Sam learns that Terry had a daughter with Snow's estranged wife, Alicia; that Terry did indeed murder Snow; and that Kelly only confessed to the murder because he was paid off and dying of cancer. When she confronts Terry, he admits to murdering Snow, but claims that it was in self-defense. Nevertheless, Sam helps Terry with the heroin deal, which appears to go off without a hitch, until they’re confronted by masked gunmen who steal the money and drugs and appear to murder Andy and Sam. Terry flees, only to realize that something's not right. He returns to the warehouse, finding nobody there, and no dead bodies. He finds a note from Sam stating that she and members of a rival criminal group tricked him, with Sam, Andy and her daughters planning to move to Spain to start over.

== Television miniseries ==
The two-part miniseries, also called The Stretch, was filmed in the UK and Spain in 1999 and broadcast in the UK on Sky One in 2000. It was the channel's “Event of the Week” on November 12, 2000. It starred Leslie Grantham and Anita Dobson as Terry and Sam Greene; the duo were reunited for the first time since they portrayed a married couple on the British soap opera EastEnders from 1985 to 1988. The Guardian called their chemistry in The Stretch “magical” and also praised “some tasty cameos and supporting performances.” Leather wrote the script, with an original score by Dobson's husband, guitarist Brian May of Queen.

== Characters ==
- Terrence William “Terry” Greene – A suave, good-looking, 52-year-old career criminal involved in numerous business ventures, some legal, others illegal.
- Samantha “Sam” Greene – Separated from her husband Terry, she is a former singer who gave up her dreams to become a housewife. 48 years old and still beautiful, she is conflicted about helping Terry with his illegal activity, which she was blind to when they were together.
- Trisha Greene – Terry and Sam's 15-year-old daughter. In school and living with Sam, she is suspicious of her father and his motives in regards to her mother.
- Jamie Greene – Terry and Sam's son, he is studying law at the University of Exeter.
- Laura Nichols – Terry and Sam's adult daughter. She is in an abusive marriage with Jonathan.
- Jonathan Nichols – Laura's abusive husband, he is first confronted by Sam and then by Terry, who threatens to murder him unless he leaves Laura alone.
- Grace Greene – Terry's mother, she has Alzheimer's and lives at Oakwood House, a home for the elderly. Sam visits her often, and feels close to Grace despite her deteriorating mind. Grace dies under suspicious circumstances, wondering out of the home and being hit by a car.
- Andy McKinley – Strong and silent, Terry's driver, he becomes Sam's driver while Terry is in prison. As he and Sam grow closer, his loyalties slowly shift from Terry to Sam.
- Preston Snow – A low-level drug dealer murdered by Terry Greene.
- Luke Snow – Preston's brother. He unsuccessfully tries to get revenge on Sam for lying in court to protect Terry.
- Alicia Snow – Preston's wife, who had a child with Terry while she was separated from Preston. The baby is kept secret from Sam, who does ultimately learn of the child.
- Frank “Raquel” Welch – London's Detective Chief Inspector, he has a long-time rivalry with Terry, who derisively calls him “Raquel” in reference to the actress Raquel Welch. He has a thing for Sam. It's not mutual.
- Mark “Blackie” Blackstock – A corrupt detective who is on Terry's payroll. He gives Welch false information and assists Sam with her plan to swindle her husband.
- Richard Asher – Terry's accountant. He doesn’t care for Sam.
- Laurence Patterson – Terry's lawyer. He and Asher convey Terry's message to Sam, that he wants her to take over his criminal activities while he's in prison.
- George Kay – One of Terry's business partners, he and Terry co-own the club Lapland, which Kay runs day-to-day. He betrays Terry and tries unsuccessfully to have him killed in prison.
- Warwick Locke – A modeling agent, and one of Terry's business partners.
- Micky Fox – Another of Terry's business partners, he flees London and hides out in Spain after a four-ton marijuana deal goes belly up.
- Zoran Poskovic – Leader of the Kosovan crew that steals from Terry. He and Sam have a mutual respect, and ultimately team up to pull one over on Terry.
- Geoff Donovan – The North London gangster who agrees to be the distributor for Terry's heroin deal.
