= True Dare Kiss =

British television drama series

- Genre: Drama
- Created by: Debbie Horsfield
- Directed by: Declan O'Dwyer; Jeremy Webb
- Starring: Dervla Kirwan; Lorraine Ashbourne; Pooky Quesnel; Esther Hall; Brendan Coyle; Paul McGann; Paul Hilton
- Composer: Ruth Barrett
- Country of origin: United Kingdom
- Original language: English
- No. of series: 1
- No. of episodes: 6

Production
- Executive producers: Kate Harwood; Debbie Horsfield
- Producer: Marcus Wilson
- Production locations: Manchester, England
- Editor: Jamie McCoan
- Running time: 60 minutes

Original release
- Network: BBC One
- Release: 28 June – 2 August 2007

True Dare Kiss is a six-part British television drama series, created by screenwriter Debbie Horsfield, that first broadcast on BBC One on 28 June 2007. The series follows the reunion of four sisters and a brother following the death of their estranged father, as they embark on a long journey to uncover the truth, revealing secrets surrounding a cataclysmic event in the past. The series, produced by Marcus Wilson, is set in the city of Manchester in the North-West of England. Filming began on 8 January 2007. The series featured a high-profile cast including Pooky Quesnel, Lorraine Ashbourne, Paul McGann, Dervla Kirwan, David Bradley and Paul Hilton. The complete series was released on DVD on 3 September 2007. Horsfield was interviewed about how the Manchester-based story came to life in the Manchester Evening News.

== Cast ==
=== Main cast ===
- Pooky Quesnel as Nita McKinnon
- Lorraine Ashbourne as Beth Sweeney
- Paul Hilton as Dennis Tyler
- Paul McGann as Nash McKinnon
- Dervla Kirwan as Phillipa Tyler
- Esther Hall as Alice Tyler
- Brendan Coyle as Kaz Sweeney
- Ciarán McMenamin as Bryce Waghorn
- David Bradley as Stanley Tyler

=== Supporting cast ===
- Elliott Tittensor as JJ
- Samantha Blakey as Lola
- Helen Moon as Nancy
- Nick Fletcher as Dougie
- Nicky Bell as Ethan
- Carlton Dickinson as Georgie
- Anji Kreft as Lois
- Martin Wenner as Sven

== Episodes ==
No.	Title	Directed by	Written by	British air date	UK viewers (million)
1	"Episode 1"	Jeremy Webb	Debbie Horsfield	28 June 2007	4.67
Businesswoman Nita McKinnon is anxious to tear down a row of old houses to make way for a property development but Stan, the last householder, an old man who lives in virtual squalor with his gay son Dennis and their dogs, will not sell; and Nita resorts to getting her drink-loving sister Beth and her brood to harass him. When he drops down dead, Nita bribes everyone to say nothing – for Stan was her father. At the funeral, Phillipa, the sister who went to work in London, turns up and clearly has a history with Nita's husband Nash. Alice, the shy youngest sister who has not seen her father in years, brings along Bryce, a young therapist she met by chance.
2	"Episode 2"	Jeremy Webb	Debbie Horsfield	5 July 2007	3.61
It's Nita's birthday, but she is concerned that her husband and Phillipa may be resuming old business – as well as saving Beth's job, when Beth, who works with Alice in catering for Nita, insults a workman. At the will reading, the house is left to Dennis and all property to Evie, Stan's wife, who left years ago. Alice is charged with finding her, but Phillipa, who seems to know where she is, is not keen to tell her. Nita offers to buy the house from Dennis and Alice is pleased with her first therapy session.
3	"Episode 3"	Jeremy Webb	Debbie Horsfield	12 July 2007	3.34
Nita has to prepare a banquet in order to gain an important catering contract and asks all the sisters, Philippa included, to help her. Dennis however, still keeps her hanging on as regards the house sale. Beth considers leaving Manchester to move to London with Phillipa, but, after Phillipa has spoken to her, she has a heart-to-heart with her husband Kaz. Beth admitted that she blinded him by accident years earlier in their courting days during a ruck with Liverpool football fans and married him out of duty. He tells her that he knew. Alice wakes from hypnosis during a session to find Bryce too close for comfort. Nita is sure she has seen Stan alive.
4	"Episode 4"	Declan O'Dwyer	Debbie Horsfield	19 July 2007	N/A
Nita's 'challenge' banquet comes to grief when Beth gets into a ruck with one of the guests and the managing director ends up with his dinner down him. Dennis plays Phillipa against Nita by saying he has an outside buyer, and invites them over to the house where there is a digger in the garden – and somebody plainly watching the sisters. Alice realises that Bryce is molesting her whilst she is in a trance.
5	"Episode 5"	Declan O'Dwyer	Debbie Horsfield	26 July 2007	N/A
Stan is alive and has video evidence of the attack that caused his 'death' but when Dennis, who is agoraphobic, tells his sisters, Stan locks him out of the house. Nita, afraid that Nash is sleeping with Phillipa, goes on an eating binge: but the upshot is that she and Nash have good sex for the first time in years. Although Alice sacks Bryce as a charlatan, he tells her that her subconscious reveals that she was once party to a violent crime. Phillipa tells her that her mother Evie, having left Stan, returned and, in an argument over ownership of the house, fell and cracked her skull. Stan buried her in the cellar. Alice obviously saw it but had blanked it out until now and later has a nightmare about her mother.
6	"Episode 6"	Declan O'Dwyer	Debbie Horsfield	2 August 2007	3.26
Stan gets his own back on Nita by 'haunting' her. She goes to see Bryce, who is about to assault her sexually whilst she is in a trance; but Alice stops him and has him arrested. After Kaz and Beth have had another good chat and decide to stay with each other, all the family is summoned to the house where they meet Evie, very much alive and back from living abroad. Stan is shocked to think his daughters believe him capable of murder and admits everything was a ploy to re-unite them. They celebrate his birthday, but he is terminally ill and some months later they attend his real funeral. Nita has won her contract and is pregnant by Nash, as is Phillipa, though she introduces her female partner to the family. Beth agrees to drink less and Nash buys the house from Dennis, who will be running a home for dogs, along with Alice.
