= Injustice (British TV series) =

British drama television series

- DVD cover
- Genre: Crime drama
- Created by: Anthony Horowitz
- Written by: Anthony Horowitz
- Directed by: Colm McCarthy (director)
- Starring: James Purefoy; Robert Whitelock; Lisa Diveney; Dervla Kirwan; Nathaniel Parker; Charlie Creed-Miles; Obi Abili
- Composer: Magnus Fiennes
- Original language: English
- No. of series: 1
- No. of episodes: 5

Production
- Producer: Eve Gutierrez
- Cinematography: Ruairi O'Brien
- Editor: St. John O'Rorke
- Running time: 45 minutes
- Production company: Injustice Films

Original release
- Network: ITV
- Release: 6 June – 10 June 2011

Injustice is a British drama television series about criminal defence barrister William Travers, who has lost faith in the legal system following a traumatic series of events. Episode one of the five-part drama premiered on 6 June 2011 on ITV. The series was released on DVD on 13 June 2011 via Acorn Media UK.

== Plot ==
Barrister Will Travers (James Purefoy), his wife, Jane (Dervla Kirwan), who teaches at a Young Offenders' Centre, and their young daughter live in the Suffolk countryside. Natalie Chandra (Sasha Behar), a London solicitor, asks Will to defend Martin Newall (Nathaniel Parker), an old friend, accused of murdering his secretary and lover but protesting his innocence. Jane is not happy when Will takes the brief on as they had left London years earlier after his last murder case, with Jane leaving behind a successful career as a publisher.

The killing of a reclusive farm worker, John Jarrold, takes place near to the Travers' home, and the investigation is led by the hard-nosed D.I. Wenborn (Charlie Creed-Miles), who strongly dislikes Will after the barrister showed that one of his men lied in court to get a false conviction.

== Cast ==
- James Purefoy as William "Will" Travers
- Charlie Creed-Miles as DI Mark Wenborn
- Dervla Kirwan as Jane Travers
- Robert Whitelock as Philip Spaull
- Lisa Diveney as Kate Travers
- Nathaniel Parker as Martin Newall
- Jayne Wisener as Lucy Wilson
- Sasha Behar as Natalie Chandra

== Episode list ==
No.	Title	Directed by	Written by	Original release date	UK viewers (millions)
1	"Episode 1"	Colm McCarthy	Anthony Horowitz	6 June 2011	6.12
Barrister Will Travers, his wife, Jane, who teaches at a Young Offenders' Centre, and their younger daughter live in the Suffolk countryside. Natalie Chandra, a London solicitor, asks Will to defend Martin Newall, an old friend, accused of murdering his secretary and lover but protesting his innocence. Jane is not happy when Will takes the brief on as they had left London years earlier after his last murder case, with Jane leaving behind a successful career as a publisher. The killing of a reclusive farm worker, John Jarrold, takes place near to the Travers' home, and the investigation is led by the hard-nosed D.I. Wenborn, who strongly dislikes Will after the barrister showed that one of his men lied in court to get a false conviction.
2	"Episode 2"	Colm McCarthy	Anthony Horowitz	7 June 2011	4.95
Martin tells Will of his affair with Lucy, the victim. During one of their hotel room visits, Martin found her dead when he came back from picking up a takeaway. His computer, with information about his employer Qestrel, an oil trading firm, was stolen. His loyal wife, Caroline, believes the theft was the reason for the murder. Will finds himself being stalked by two men trying to dissuade the Qestrel investigation and who are aware the word Agadir was typed into the computer. In Suffolk, Jane is impressed by a story written by Alan, her stand-out pupil. When her former employer makes a strong effort to woo her back into her former senior position at the publishing house, Jane asks that he read Alan's manuscript and consider it for publication which he agrees to do because he badly wants her to come back. D.I. Wenborn gets it into his head that Jarrold was executed, especially once he learns he was really animal rights activist Philip Spaull.
3	"Episode 3"	Colm McCarthy	Anthony Horowitz	8 June 2011	4.66
Will, Natalie and her junior, David, find 'Agadir' several times with various dates on Lucy's mobile phone. Martin, now on bail, is also quizzed by his boss, Renner, as to why the Agadir file was keyed into his computer. Natalie and Will establish that a hotel chambermaid saw the computer before Martin went out. Wenborn's wife, suffering from post-natal depression, is arrested for shop-lifting, infuriating and embarrassing her unsympathetic husband. The grumpy detective later learns that Will successfully defended Spaull when the activist was accused of killing a little boy, the very murder case that later prompted Will's family to leave London. Will is non-committal when Wenborn quizzes him about the trial; however, as it turns out, Spaull had later confessed his guilt to Will, prompting Will's meltdown and move away from London. Jane, meanwhile, visits Alan's mother and learns that he was imprisoned for shooting another boy who was bullying him at school.
4	"Episode 4"	Colm McCarthy	Anthony Horowitz	9 June 2011	5.03
Will and Natalie find out that Lucy had a previous conviction for blackmail; also, she was making phone calls to Jameel Khan, a journalist investigating Qestrel's possible exploitation of its African locations. To the horror of his kindly sergeant, D.S. Taylor, Wenborn bullies a terrified Alan into revealing who provided him with the gun, the same supplier of the gun that shot Spaull. The trail leads to Mickey Bankes, Alan's mother's boyfriend, who sold it to John Slater, a dock worker. However, Slater admits that he was only a go-between and does not know the true identity of his client. An angry Wenborn punches his wife after she accuses him of infidelity. In the meantime, Jane is shocked to find that Alan has committed suicide, thanks to Wenborn's bullying.
5	"Episode 5"	Colm McCarthy	Anthony Horowitz	10 June 2011	5.28
Jameel Khan comes forward to say that he deliberately planted Lucy in the Qestrel office and encouraged her affair to get evidence of the firm's illegal dumping of toxic waste in Africa, collected by a ship called the Agadir. Will makes full use of this at Martin's trial. Will and Jane plan on returning to London after the end of the trial. This especially pleases Jane, who feels guilty over Alan's suicide. Wenborn attempts to blackmail John Slater by offering to let him go if he will falsely name Will as the man he sold the gun to. Wenborn's wife, after years of domestic abuse, ensures that his triumph is short-lived and ultimately more than one injustice is avenged as wrong-doers who have escaped the law are punished.

== Reception ==
Catherine Gee of The Telegraph called Injustice a "nicely complex and multi-layered drama – even if it does resort to the occasional cliché."
