= The Bombmaker =

- Genre: Thriller
- Screenplay by: Stephen Leather
- Directed by: Graham Theakston
- Starring: Dervla Kirwan; Mark Womack; Ciara Lyons; David Hunt; Angeline Ball; Marc Warren; Francis Magee; Daragh O'Malley; Brendan Coyle; Samantha Bond
- Music by: Mike Moran
- Country of origin: United Kingdom
- Original language: English
- No. of series: 1
- No. of episodes: 2

Production
- Executive producers: Keith Evans; Mark Freeland
- Producer: Paul Knight
- Cinematography: Lukas Strebel
- Editor: Nigel Parkes
- Running time: 90 minutes
- Production company: Paul Knight Productions

Original release
- Network: Sky One
- Release: 8 April – 15 April 2001

The Bombmaker is a two-part British television drama serial, written and created by Stephen Leather, and directed by Graham Theakston. It first broadcast on Sky One on 8 April 2001, with the second and final episode following a week later on 15 April. The series, based upon Leather's novel of the same name, stars Dervla Kirwan as Andrea Hayes, a former IRA bombmaker who is forced to come out of retirement when her daughter is kidnapped and held to ransom.

Mark Womack stars as Andrea's husband Martin, while Ciara Lyons plays the role of her daughter, Katie. David Hunt, Angeline Ball, Marc Warren, Francis Magee, Daragh O'Malley, Brendan Coyle and Samantha Bond are also credited as principal members of the cast. Filming on the series commenced in September 2000. Notably, the series has yet to be released on DVD.

== Production ==
Dervla Kirwan said of her role as Andrea Hayes; "Graham Theakston, with whom I worked on The Dark Room (a BBC1 adaptation of the Minette Walters novel), was directing The Bombmaker and asked me if I was interested. I could see all the pitfalls in the script, but female characters who dominate like Andrea are few and far between. Whatever flaws there are, you owe it to yourself to do it. I've made a lot of mistakes in my career but the biggest mistake I've made is to turn down work. And I read Stephen Leather's book on which it was based, knew it was a bestseller and I think my commercial head took over."

Stephen Leather said of writing the series; "There are several major twists the audience won't see coming...it's not a run-of-the-mill kidnapping, but you don't find out until the end why the kidnappers have taken the little girl. You think it's an IRA story, but... it constantly keeps you guessing."

== Cast ==
- Dervla Kirwan as Andrea Hayes
- Mark Womack as Martin Hayes
- Ciara Lyons as Katie Hayes
- David Hunt as Egan
- Angeline Ball as Lydia McCracken
- Marc Warren as Quinn
- Francis Magee as O'Keefe
- Daragh O'Malley as Mick Canning
- Brendan Coyle as George McEvoy
- Samantha Bond as Patsy
- Brian Doherty as DI Fitzgerald
- Keith Duffy as DS Power
- Maria McDermottroe as Miss O'Mara
- Barry Barnes as Padraig
- Scott Maslen as Captain Payne
- Andrew Pleavin Captain Crosbie
- Fiona Kember-Smith as Agent Gannon
- Lyn Fullerton as Nuala

== Episodes ==
| No. | Title | Directed by | Written by | Original release date | UK viewers (millions) |
|---|---|---|---|---|---|
| 1 | "Part 1" | Graham Theakston | Stephen Leather | 8 April 2001 | 0.86 |
Expert IRA bomb-maker turned police informant Andrea Hayes retires and starts a new life after four school-children are killed by one of her bombs. Ten years later, her blissful home life shattered when her daughter, Katie, is abducted from her bedroom in the dead of night. Andrea later discovers a ransom note, instructing her to leave her husband Martin and fly to London by herself. It also states that if the police are contacted, she and Martin will never see Katie again. In the hope of being reunited with Katie, Andrea obeys orders and follows instructions to meet with the kidnappers. Back in Dublin, Martin is powerless to help and becomes frantic with worry when he learns from Andrea that no ransom demand has been made, and that the kidnappers' request is something much more dangerous.
| 2 | "Part 2" | Graham Theakston | Stephen Leather | 15 April 2001 | N/A |
Having successfully hidden her past as a terrorist bombmaker, Martin is shocked to the discover Andrea's true identity. Meanwhile, the kidnappers instruct Andrea to construct a giant bomb in the City of London, which, if detonated, will cause widespread devastation and death. They inform her that refusal to undertake their commands will result in Katie's death. While Martin works with the police and the SAS to locate and free his family, Andrea is forced to make the horrendous choice of losing her only child or causing the deaths of hundreds of innocent people. With time running out, Andrea has no choice but to follow the kidnappers' demands.
