= Fingercuff Productions =

Fingercuff Productions aka Fingercuff was a British film production company specialising in short films and corporate promos. Their work was broadcast on numerous channels such as MTV, ITV, Channel AKA, Propeller TV, Channel 4, screened at BAFTA and also shown at film festivals around the world. The company was founded in 2000 by filmmakers James Webber and Jamie Hooper.

== Filmography ==
Year	Title	Screenings/Awards
2014	Terry and Brenda	N/A
2014	Soror	N/A
2013	Plastic Love	Cannes Short Film Corner: Official Selection; Bootleg Edinburgh: Best Short Film, Best Actor in a Short; Strangers in a Cinema: Best Director, Best Actress (Runner Up); International Film Festival of Cinematic Arts LA: Official Selection; CineKink New York: Official Selection; Gloucestershire Showcase Short Film Festival: Official Selection
2012	Driftwood	Cannes Short Film Corner 2013: Coup de Coeur; British Independent Film Festival 2013: Winner – Best Cinematography, Nominated – Best Short Film; Rob Knox Film Festival 2013: Winner – Best Film, Best Screenplay; NOFI International Film Festival 2013: Winner – Best Film, Best Actor, Best Editing; Sunset Film Festival LA 2013: Winner – Best Foreign Film; Buxton Film Open Shorts 2013: Winner – Best Film; Cluj International Short Film Festival 2013: Nominated – Best Film & Best Director; London Independent Film Festival 2013: Official Selection; London Short Film Festival 2013: Official Selection; East End Film Festival 2013: Official Selection; Newport Beach Film Festival 2013: Official Selection; Pittsburgh Independent Film Festival 2013: Official Selection; Salento Finibus Terrae Film Festival 2013: Official Selection; Edinburgh Short Film Festival 2013: Official Selection; Loch Ness Film Festival 2013: Official Selection; UK Film Festival 2013: Official Selection; Bootleg All-Stars New York 2013: Official Selection
2011	The Halloween Kid	Completed
2011	Three	Red Carpet Screenings: The Matthew Hook Award
2011	Peanut Butter Lips	FilmsShort.com Competition: Best Film; Virgin TiVo, Comedy Shorts: Official Selection; Rotoreliefs: Official Selection
2010	Dancer	Guernsey Lily International Film Festival: Best Film, Best Fiction; American Film & Video Festival (AMPS): Best Film, Best Script, Best Editing, Best Cinematography; Austrian Golden Diana: Gold Award; BIAFF: Best British Film, Best Story, Diamond Award; Estonia Tallinn: First Place; Canadian International Film & Video Festival: Bronze Award; UNICA Luxembourg: Bronze Medal; Portobello Film Festival: Official Selection; London Film Makers Convention: Official Selection
2010	Side by Side	WorldKids International Film Festival: Official Selection; The Strawberry Shorts Film Festival: Official Selection; The Peddler Contest – Network Releasing: Finalist; Dark Carnival underneath Waterloo Station: Official Selection; Our Indie Cinema: Official Selection; The Antelope Sunday Screenings: Official Selection; The Book Club (Brain Wash): Official Selection
2010	Vision	Guernsey Lily International Film Festival 2010: Best Sound; Fantastic Fest: Official Selection; Coney Island Film Festival: Official Selection; Oklahoma Horror Film Festival: Official Selection; Eerie Horror Film Festival: Official Selection; Chungmuro International Film Festival: Official Selection; Crystal Palace International Film Festival: Official Selection; Razor Reel Fantastic Film Festival: Official Selection; Dark Carnival Film Festival: Official Selection; Grimmfest – Grimm Up North 2: Official Selection; HorrorFind Weekend Film Festival: Official Selection; Brain Wash Halloween New York: Official Selection; Portobello Film Festival: Official Selection; 1UP Microcinema: Official Selection; Knoxville Horror Fest: Official Selection; A Night of Horror International Film Festival: Official Selection; Red Carpet Screenings: Official Selection; The Book Club (Brain Wash): Official Selection; X Fest South Africa: Official Selection; London Filmmakers Convention: Official Selection
2009	Commitment	American International Film & Video Festival: Best Film, Best Story; Canadian International Film & Video Festival: Star Award; British International Film Festival: Best British Film; Estonia Tallinn: Special Prize Winner; 71st World Independent Film Festival UNICA: Bronze Medal Winner; Surrey Film Festival: Best Film; Guernsey Lily International Film Festival: Very Highly Commended
2009	Edge	Canadian International Film & Video Festival: Star Award; Guernsey Lily International Film Festival: Very Highly Commended

== Collaborations ==
Fingercuff collaborated on short films with actors such as Kate Dickie, Neil Maskell, Derek Jacobi, Julian Glover, Anna Walton, Sian Breckin, James Alexandrou, Sam Gittins, Tim Blackwell, Debra Baker, Charlotte Mounter, Ben Wigzell, Olivia Chappell, Stuart Sessions, David Avery, Paula Gilbert, Harry Macqueen and Francesca Fowler. Fingercuff co-produced with Neil Marshall the short film The Halloween Kid (dir. Axelle Carolyn). Fingercuff have created promos for Clogau Gold, Amnesty International, Disney, Oakley Photography and the Film4 London FrightFest Film Festival.
