= Songdog =

Welsh folk noir trio

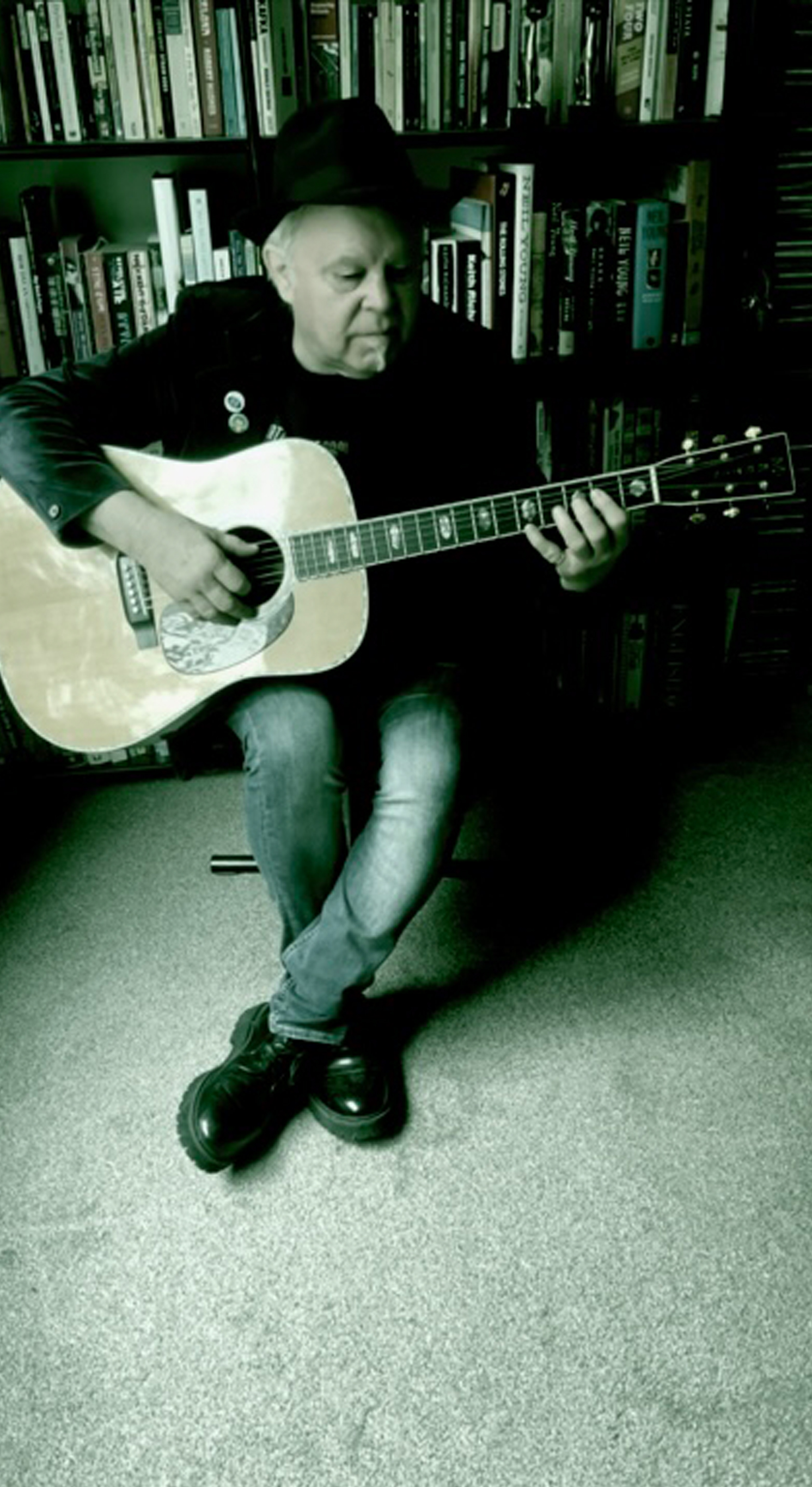
- Green-tinted full colour photograph of Songdog's songwriter and lead vocalist Lyndon Morgans, playing acoustic guitar at the home of Songdog's keyboard player Karl Woodward in 2025.

Background information
- Origin: Blackwood, Caerphilly, Wales
- Genres: Folk Noir, acoustic
- Years active: 2000–present
- Labels: Evangeline Records, One Little Indian Records, Junkyard Songs
- Members: Lyndon Morgans; Karl Woodward; Bethan Frieze
- Past members: Dave Paterson (2000-2021)
- Website: songdog.co.uk

Songdog are a Welsh folk noir trio who formed in 2000. As of January 2026, current members are Lyndon Morgans (vocals, acoustic guitar, songwriting/arrangement), Karl Woodward (keyboards, mandolin, banjo, harmonica, electric guitar) and newest member Bethan Frieze (violin, backing vocals), who joined in 2022.

Songdog's latest album, Mirabilia Mundi was released on 28 March 2025 via Junkyard Songs and received 4 and 5* reviews from Uncut, Mojo and RnR magazines, amongst others.

The band’s debut album, The Way of the World, was self-released in June 2001. In 2003 the band’s second album, Haiku, was released on Evangeline Records. The album received a four (out of five) star review in Uncut. By the time of the third album in 2006 the band had signed with One Little Indian Records. 2008’s A Wretched Sinner's Song was a double album released to mixed reviews. Their fifth album isA Life Eroding Mojo awarded the album four (out of five) stars. Songdog's sixth album Last Orders at Harry's Bar was released in 2013. Joy Street, their seventh, was released in late summer 2017 on Junkyard Songs (trailered earlier by single "It's Not A Love Thing"), produced by Nigel Stonier (who also worked with Fairport Convention and Joan Baez). A Happy Ending, was released in March 2020 on Junkyard Songs, receiving 9/10 from Uncut magazine (Allan Jones), 4 stars from The Mirror (Gavin Martin), 4 stars from Rock n Reel (Nick Toczek) and 9/10 from Americana UK (Tim Martin)."Songdog "A Happy Ending" (Junkyard Songs, 2020)". 3 April 2020.. Songdog's 2022 album ‘Of Gods And Men’ was released under Lyndon Morgans's own name.

== Discography ==
- The Way of the World (Album, Zara Records, 2001)
- Haiku (Album, Evangeline Records, 2003)
- The Time of Summer Lightning (Album, One Little Indian Records, 2005)
  - Janie Jones (cover of The Clash original) (A side) / Cold Coffee and Ava Gardner (B side) (7" vinyl single, One Little Indian Records, 2005)
  - Janie Jones (cover of The Clash original) / Cold Coffee and Ava Gardner/ Fairylights (CD maxi single, One Little Indian Records, 2005)
  - Childhood Skies (A side) / Filipino Girls (Lip-Synching Dusty Springfield Songs) (B side) (7" vinyl single, One Little Indian Records, 2005)
  - Childhood Skies / Tarot (CD maxi single, One Little Indian Records, 2005)
- A Wretched Sinner's Song (Album, One Little Indian Records, 2008)
  - Pilgrim Hill (CD promo and DL only, One Little Indian Records, 2008)
- A Life Eroding (Album, One Little Indian Records, 26 Apr. 2010)
- Last Orders at Harry's Bar (Album, Junkyard Songs, 7 Oct. 2013)
- Joy Street (Album, Junkyard Songs, July 2017)
- A Happy Ending (Album, Junkyard Songs, March 2020)
- Of Gods And Men (Album, Junkyard Songs, October 2022)
- Mirabilia Mundi (Album, Junkyard Songs, March 2025)
