= Spooks series 10 =

10th series of the British television show Spooks

Spooks
- Season 10
- DVD cover art of the Spooks series ten
- No. of episodes: 6

Release
- Original network: BBC One
- Original release: 18 September – 23 October 2011

Series chronology
- ← Previous; Series 9 Next → The Greater Good

The tenth and final series of the BBC espionage television series Spooks (known as MI-5 in the United States) began broadcasting on 18 September 2011 on BBC One, and continued until 23 October. It consists of six episodes. The series continues the actions of Section D, a fictional counter-terrorism division of the British Security Service (MI5). In August 2011, Kudos Film and Television, the production company behind Spooks, announced that the tenth series will be its last, as they wanted the show to end "in its prime".

In this series, former Russian spy-turned-politician Ilya Gavrik (Jonathan Hyde), Harry Pearce's (Peter Firth) opposite during the Cold War, proposes a strategic partnership between Russia and the United Kingdom. Also with Gavrik is his wife Elena (Alice Krige), with whom Harry had an affair during the 1980s. However, over the course of the series Section D must stop those who intend to sabotage the partnership. As well as Firth, Nicola Walker, Max Brown, Shazad Latif, Simon Russell Beale, Lara Pulver and Geoffrey Streatfeild are included as the main cast. The final episode includes a cameo appearance of Matthew Macfadyen, who headlined the first two years of the show.

Ratings for the series generally struggled as it went against Downton Abbey, a highly successful period drama series from ITV1, which was seen by nearly twice the audience; the series attained a per-episode average ratings of 5.41 million viewers. Reviews of the final series were polarised between positive and negative, with critical opinions ranging from "as impressive as ever" to looking "tattered and tired". The DVD box set of the tenth series was released on 28 November 2011 in Region 2, on 6 March 2012 in Region 1, and on 4 April 2012 in Region 4.

== Cast ==
=== Main ===
- Peter Firth as Harry Pearce
- Nicola Walker as Ruth Evershed
- Max Brown as Dimitri Levendis
- Shazad Latif as Tariq Masood (episodes 1–2)
- Lara Pulver as Erin Watts
- Geoffrey Streatfield as Calum Reed

=== Guest ===
- Simon Russell Beale as Home Secretary William Towers
- Jonathan Hyde as Ilya Gavrik
- Alice Krige as Elena Gavrik
- Matthew Macfadyen as Tom Quinn

== Episodes ==
No. overall	No. in series	Title	Directed by	Written by	Original release date	UK viewers (millions)
81	1	"Episode 1"	Alrick Riley	Jonathan Brackley & Sam Vincent	18 September 2011	5.63
Two months after trading Albany, a state secret, for Ruth Evershed, Sir Harry Pearce is on garden leave until a tribunal can determine his future with MI5, however Home Secretary William Towers arranges for Harry to return on a provisional basis until its conclusion. Harry learns that Towers has smuggled his Russian opposite, Ilya Gavrik, into the country to propose a strategic partnership between Russia and the United Kingdom without the knowledge of the United States government. It has also emerged that a friend of Harry's, Max Witt, was murdered because he knew somebody is posing as Harry using his old coded messages from the Cold War; the imposter made contact with Elena, Gavrik's wife, and Harry's former asset. After Section D learns of an assassination plot against Gavrik during a function, new Section D Chief Erin Watts manages to stop and kill the assassin. Despite this, the assassin's handlers deem the mission a success. Later, Harry reveals to Ruth that he and Elena were lovers, and that FSB officer Sasha Gavrik is their son.
82	2	"Episode 2"	Alrick Riley	Jonathan Brackley & Sam Vincent	25 September 2011	5.12
A laptop containing the identities of five high level assets is stolen when Calum Reed is attacked. Several attempts to find the thieves are unsuccessful as they are highly resourceful. The identity of the first asset is later leaked to the Internet and he is found apparently murdered by his Iranian targets. Furthermore another one of the assets is Martha Ford, who is working for one of Gavrik's companies. When her name is leaked next, Erin rescues her and brings her to a safe house. However under pressure from Gavrik, Harry orders Erin to break all ties with her. Meanwhile, after Harry meets with Elena to warn her of the imposter, he asks Ruth to look up CIA deputy director and Cold War colleague Jim Coaver, believing he is the imposter. After returning home Tariq Masood discovers the identity of one of the muggers. However, he realises they are on to him, and tries to return to Thames House. He is then injected with poison en route, and dies as he arrives to meet Calum.
83	3	"Episode 3"	Julian Homes	Jonathan Brackley & Sam Vincent	2 October 2011	5.15
Section D learns that known anarchist Johnny Grier is in London, and is believed to be making a dirty bomb after trace amounts of radioactive material was detected at Heathrow Airport. To get close to Grier, Dimitri Levendis is assigned to honeytrap his sister, Natalie, via Internet dating. Section D follows him to a cell, who plans to attack the Velanon Group, a financial company who made millions from a nuclear disaster. When Dimitri confronts him, Grier reveals he thought he was smuggling heroin to the country, and is unaware of the bomb plot. After he reluctantly agrees to help, the team find that Grier has double crossed them so that he could assassinate Velanon's CEO with radioactive powder; Dimitri fails to stop him, and the building is evacuated. Meanwhile, Towers offers Ruth a promotion as his security advisor. Harry's suspicion into Coaver has been solidified, especially after Calum found what Tariq found before his death; one of the muggers was also present during Gavrik's assassination attempt, and is also a deniable CIA asset.
84	4	"Episode 4"	Julian Holmes	Sean Cook	9 October 2011	5.31
Imprisoned Islamic extremist leader Zubier Al-Saad appoints two recently released inmates to commit a suicide attack. One of the released is Ashur Mohali, an asset from the prison who passed intelligence to Section D; he agrees to help stop the attack on the condition that his daughter be given British citizenship. However his handlers already kidnapped her to ensure the attack succeeds, and Ashur is now committed to the cause for his daughter's safety. Section D later learns that the attack will take place in Trafalgar Square. When Erin confronts him, she learns the handlers also have her daughter, Rosie. If the attack fails, she will die; Dimitri is able to kill the handler as Ashur is killed by CO19. Meanwhile, Harry must find incontrovertible proof against Coaver. He and Ruth use Elena and Sasha as bait to get to Coaver, but find the mysterious woman instead. However, they find evidence that Coaver was linked. Later, Ruth tells Harry about the offer from Towers; he encourages her to take it, as he does not want her involved in what he plans against Coaver.
85	5	"Episode 5"	Bharat Nalluri	Jonathan Brackley & Sam Vincent & Anthony Neilson	16 October 2011	5.27
Harry, Erin and Dimitri kidnap Coaver. However, during the interrogation, he insists he is not attempting to derail the talks between Gavrik and the British. A CIA team later arrives to recover Coaver, but after they depart another CIA team arrives; realising the first team were imposters, the MI5 agents give chase. The imposters throw a beaten Coaver from their vehicle, and a dying Coaver tells Harry that his laptop contains the answers he seeks. Harry later meets with Elena, confiding that he now believes her husband to be the mole. When Gavrik visits Harry later, he reveals he always knew Harry ran Elena, but has no interest in killing his wife. Harry convinces Ruth to steal Coaver's laptop from the United States Embassy, but she is intercepted by Sasha before she can give it to Harry, and Sasha learns from it that Harry is his biological father. Meanwhile, Section D believe that the fake CIA agents are part of a mercenary group with ties to Gavrik (the ring leader was once his personal bodyguard). The mercenaries detonate a car bomb, injuring Towers. The next day, the CIA demands Harry's extradition, and Towers agrees, handing Harry over into their custody.
86	6	"Episode 6"	Bharat Nalluri	Jonathan Brackley & Sam Vincent	23 October 2011	5.95
After Elena claims she has information about an upcoming attack that she will only disclose to Harry, the Section D team breaks him out of CIA custody and hides at an abandoned Ministry of Defence site. Elena reveals she was involved in the subterfuge against the UK/Russia partnership talks, and is planning an attack meant to push Britain and Russia into war, with the help of Russian politicians who view the partnership as embarrassing to them. Furthermore she reveals Sasha is not Harry's son. The team learns that Pavel Zykov will commit a suicide mission on a London-bound aeroplane. However, Ruth becomes convinced that Elena is lying, and that Zykov is trying to have the British shoot down the plane. When the Home Secretary receives a call from Gavrik (who has watched Elena's confession) convincing him the attack is fake, he aborts the mission, after which Gavrik kills Elena. Ruth sees Harry and convinces him to leave the service with her. However, Sasha blames Harry for allowing his father to kill his mother and attempts to stab him, only for Ruth to step in, take the hit and die. Elena's colleagues are then brought to justice with the help of former MI5 officer Tom Quinn, now a private security contractor. Harry visits a memorial in Thames House honouring the MI5 officers killed on duty, some of whom were characters from previous episodes, with Ruth's being the latest name added. The episode ends with Harry answering the phone in his office, having decided to stay in the service.

== Casting ==
The cast for series ten (from left to right): Max Brown as Demitri Levendis, Nicola Walker as Ruth Evershed, Peter Firth as Harry Pearce, Geoffrey Streatfield as Calum Reed, Lara Pulver as Erin Watts.

Peter Firth returned as Harry Pearce. The tenth series began with Harry on "gardening leave" after trading Albany, a state secret, for Ruth's safety. Also, Harry recalls an operation during the 1980s where he fell in love with Russian double agent Elena. Firth said that Harry would not be killed off in the series. Sam Reid will play a younger version of Harry. Nicola Walker returned as Ruth Evershed and Max Brown reprises his role as Dimitri Levendis. Brown said of his return to Spooks; "I couldn't wait to get back under the skin of Dimitri and see what new challenges he faced this year. He's a bit more senior now because he's been on the Grid for a year." Shazad Latif also reprised his role as Tariq Masood for the first two episodes, and Simon Russell Beale returned as Home Secretary William Towers.

The series also introduced several new characters. Lara Pulver was cast as the new Chief of Section D, Erin Watts. Pulver described Erin as "young", "feisty", and has got "something to prove... but she has a maturity and a delicacy with the matters she's handling that makes her really good at her job". The character is also a single mother. The actress returned to London from Los Angeles to participate in other projects in the UK. When the Spooks casting directors heard of her arrival, they approached her. She was back in Los Angeles when she was told she won the part. Geoffrey Streatfeild was cast as Calum Reed, an information technology (IT) expert. Streatfeild researched his role before starting. The actor was a fan of Spooks and found it "weird to join a group of people when you know their characters". Jonathan Hyde and Alice Krige also had special guest roles in the series; Krige portrayed Elena, with Jenni Herzberg playing the younger version of Elena.

Two main characters from the ninth series did not return: Richard Armitage did not return as Lucas North. Firth has stated that Lucas "was always going to die" at the end of the ninth series. At the time, Armitage was filming for The Hobbit film project. Also, Sophia Myles did not return as Beth Bailey as the character was decommissioned between the ninth and tenth series. Myles wanted to pursue other projects in America. Matthew Macfadyen, who starred in the first three series as protagonist Tom Quinn, returned for a cameo appearance in the series finale.

== Production ==
=== Crew ===
Jonathan Brackley and Sam Vincent, who have been the head writers for the previous ninth series of Spooks, returned to their writing duties for the tenth series. Sean Cook and Anthony Neilson are also writers of the series. Alrick Riley, Julian Holmes and Bharat Nalluri are the series directors, with Nalluri directing the last two episodes. Chris Fry is the series producer, and Jane Featherstone, Simon Crawford Collins and Howard Burch are the executive producers.

=== Development ===
Early on in the series's developmental stage, it was decided that it would only consist of six episodes, likely because of budget cuts at the BBC. The series featured a mix of standalone stories, and a "big old arc" that runs through it. The arc focuses on Harry, the only remaining original lead character from the first series. The Harry/Ruth storyline continued, as Firth believed it is "too delicious to stop". The series also saw the pair's relationship enter a new phase, though it may probably be "too late for them to proceed any further". Brackley and Vincent realise that there are fans of the show who will be "immensely cheesed off if they get anything less than Ruth riding in on a unicorn to marry Harry in a white suit", but at the same time know other fans "love the uncompromising toughness of Spooks. And both viewpoints were always well represented around the table".

The storyline also features Harry and the Section D team forging new relationships with different countries, including Russia, which in the series has a better image in the Middle East. Because of this, the writers storyline a deteriorating "Special Relationship" between Britain and the United States. For the finale episode, the writers went through "countless" ideas for how it would end. Some of the dropped ideas lasted for weeks, one of them being Harry detonating a nuclear weapon in Siberia. Other characters had their own stories as well. Dimitri was the "chief action man", with his very own centric episode, where he was to honeytrap a young woman in the third episode. Though Myles left the series, there were plans to explore her character's past further should Myles remain on board. On the other hand, it allowed the writers to introduce Erin Watts and Calum Reed. Real world events were often written into Spooks episodes, though they do not alter their main plots. Episodes of the tenth series made references to such world events in 2011 such as the 2011 Libyan civil war, and the death of Osama bin Laden. Filming took place from March to June 2011.

=== Series conclusion ===
In August 2011, Kudos announced that the tenth would be the final series. Executive producer Jane Featherstone decided to end the series during its writing stage, stating "It's very tempting to keep going, and we have had ongoing conversations with our partners at the BBC about it, but the heart of the show has become those two characters [Harry and Ruth] and I feel they own it. We've followed the arc of their personal story and I think they've brought us to a natural end, which you will all see played out later this year." It was also intended to end the series "in its prime". Writers Brackley and Vincent noted "there was always a strong possibility of it being the end, so throughout the [writing] process we were looking for ways to infuse it with a sense of finality. We'd done a fair bit of writing before it was made definite by Kudos – but had plenty of time to plot a true conclusion. And crucially, by the time we began to write the final ep, we knew it would be the last." They also stated; "When Kudos asked for our opinion, we said we'd hate to see it cancelled on a cliffhanger – it just wouldn't be right, or fair on the fans. Call us suck-ups, but you have to really admire Kudos for having the confidence to kill off a very successful show – purely because it's the right thing creatively." Firth believed the series was getting to a point where the producers were starting to run out of story ideas, as virtually every type of antagonist has been featured.

== Broadcast and reception ==
=== Trailers ===
A number of trailers were produced before the broadcast of the tenth series. A first look trailer was first released in July 2011 on the BBC, which also consists clips from other BBC programmes including The Body Farm, Doctor Who, The Hour, Merlin and Page Eight. In early September a short teaser trailer was released, which includes clips of the series with the tagline "This is the end." This was followed by a full 30-second trailer a week later.

=== Broadcast and ratings ===
The tenth series began broadcast on Sunday, 18 September 2011, during the 9 pm to 10 pm timeslot, on BBC One. It was considered a move as previous series were often broadcast on a Monday. The move would make the finale series a "special event" by placing it on a Sunday night. However, it emerged that the final series would face off against the second series of the highly successful ITV1 period drama series Downton Abbey, which averaged nine million viewers in its first year. The BBC however, defended the position by saying that "Downton and Spooks are very different shows and offer a real alternative for audiences."

After the broadcast of the first episode, Spooks received overnight viewing figures of 4.62 million with a 17 per cent audience share. It lost out to Downton Abbey which received almost twice the viewers, with nine million and a 34.6 per cent share. Overnight ratings for the series ten premiere was down from the 5.58 million that tuned in for the series nine premiere episode. By the second week, overnight figures for Spooks went down nearly half a million to 4.15 million, as Downton ratings increased. However, despite being trounced by Downton Abbey, Spooks saw a gradual increase in viewership over the subsequent weeks, leading up to a boost of up to 5.13 million viewers for the final episode on 23 October 2011. With consolidated ratings factored in, the last series of Spooks was given a per-episode average of 5.41 million viewers. (Note: See the ratings on the episode table above. Look up the top 30 weekly programmes from weeks ending 18 September to 23 October 2011 from the Broadcasters' Audience Research Board website.)

=== Critical reception ===
Critical reactions were polarised. Among the positive reviews, Peter Sharples of CultBox rated the series five out of five, commending it for looking "more cinematic than in previous years", adding "any reduction in budget certainly doesn't show, with the action scenes as impressive as ever". Sharples was also appreciative of the "pretty strong" new cast, including Pulver for "making a big impression as a tough action girl juggling responsibilities as section head with those of a single parent", and Streatfeild for being "amusingly cocky and insubordinate". Sharples also commented that "ultimately Series 10 belongs to Peter Firth and Nicola Walker (more so than ever in the final, heartrending moments), confirming that it is they who held Spooks together and, pushed even more to the fore, elevate the series to a new level". Sam Wollaston of The Guardian's review was mostly a response to John le Carré who branded Spooks as "crap" for its lack of a true representation of MI5; "Lighten up J le C, no one thinks it is actually like that, it's just a bit of fun. And it is fun, exciting too. Plus it deals with important social issues...Spooks sends out positive messages about work and single-parenting; you don't get that in Tinker Tailor ... OK, it is crap, but good crap". Morgan Jeffery of Digital Spy listed the final series of as "Best of the Rest" for 2011, television shows that failed to make the website's top 25 television series. Jeffery however, gave the series a favourable review, stating that although the show "waxed and waned over the years”, the tenth series "saw Spooks back on top form", adding "the final run unfolded with a great deal of pace, excitement and emotion".

Adam Sweeting of The Arts Desk however, said that the tenth series "hadn't been the finest, partly because the death of Richard Armitage's Lucas North at the end of Series nine" left an unfilled "void". He suggested that "Lara Pulver never seemed comfortable as Erin Watts, Section D's new head, because she looked as if she'd been seconded from a modelling agency, while promoting Dimitri …merely allowed him to become more faceless by the hour". Andrew Pettie of The Daily Telegraph believed that Spooks is looking "tattered and tired", with a plot that is "about as up-to-date as the Berlin Wall". Pettie was also critical of the "motion analysis filter", a series-adopted technique for matching people by the way they walk. Pettie "The rare moments of intrigue were dredged from Harry's past affair with a Russian double agent. There will no doubt be more double-dealing to come. But in recent years the most enjoyable bits of Spooks have also been the least plausible, as the scriptwriters really let their hair down and do something silly", he rated the premiere episode two out of five. Tom Sutcliff of The Independent also rated the premiere episode two out of five, stating "Spooks isn't even true to its own account of the world, let alone the one the rest of us inhabit. At one moment, a senior Russian minister was described as virtually unfollowable because of his wily knowledge of tradecraft. At the next, one of Harry's boys was sauntering past the boot of his car to clip on a tracker, in full view of the target and his security men".

== Home video release ==
The tenth series was first released on DVD on 28 November 2011 in the United Kingdom (Region 2), and was later released in the United States (Region 1) on 6 March 2012, and in Australia (Region 4) on 4 April 2012. The box set includes all six episodes on three discs, with two of them containing optional audio commentaries from the writers and directors. Other special features include two featurettes; Spooks' Top 10 Moments, which comprise cast and crew members picking their favourite Spooks scenes, and Harry's Game, which features interviews concerning the story arc of the tenth series. It was released with a "15" British Board of Film Classification (BBFC) certificate (unsuitable for viewers under the age of 15 years).
