= Series 10, Episode 6 (Spooks) =

- Spooks episode
- Episode no.: Series 10; Episode 6
- Directed by: Bharat Nalluri
- Written by: Jonathan Brackley; Sam Vincent
- Original air date: 23 October 2011
- Running time: 59 minutes

Guest appearances
- Andrew Byron as Pavel Zykov; Nicola King as Estate Agent; Matthew Macfadyen as Tom Quinn; Jeffry Wickham as Mikhail Levrov; David Cann as Chief of Airstaff; Sam Reid as Young Harry; Jenni Herzberg as Young Elena; Irena Michi as X-ray Operator; Leemore Marrett as CIA Officer; Ursula Valentinovich as Flight Attendant; Vincent Montuel as FSB Officer

Episode chronology
← Previous "Series 10, Episode 5"	Next → —
- Spooks (series 10)

The series ten finale of the British spy drama television series Spooks was originally broadcast on BBC One on 23 October 2011. It is the show's sixth episode of the tenth series and the 86th and final episode of Spooks. The episode was written by Jonathan Brackley and Sam Vincent, and directed by Bharat Nalluri. The series finale concludes the "Tourmeline" story-arc that ran through the final series. Section D tries to prevent a terrorist attack from a Russian ultranationalist that will disrupt a partnership between Russia and the United Kingdom, and push both nations into war.

The episode sees the return of Tom Quinn, a main character from the first three series portrayed by Matthew Macfadyen. The finale was seen by over five million viewers, a series high, though in the same timeslot it was again beaten by ITV1 period drama Downton Abbey. It was met with generally positive reactions from television critics.

== Background ==
The episode sees the conclusion of the "Tourmeline" story arc for series ten. Russian Interior Minister Ilya Gavrik (Jonathan Hyde) arrives in the United Kingdom to propose a strategic partnership between the two nations. Gavrik's wife, Elena (Alice Krige), was a former MI5 spy codenamed "Tourmeline" run by Harry Pearce (Peter Firth). Harry and Elena were lovers in the early 1980s, and Harry believes that Sasha Gavrik is his son. While the talks take place, MI5 uncovers a number of attempts to derail the agreement: An attempt made on Gavrik's life, MI5 analyst Tariq Masood (Shazad Latif) is killed after discovering the identity of the person who reactivated Elena, and an assassin attempts to shoot Elena.

Harry becomes convinced that Jim Coaver (William Hope), deputy director of the Central Intelligence Agency (CIA) and Harry's partner during 1982, is responsible for the attacks. Harry abducts and interrogates Coaver, who denies any knowledge of the attacks. Coaver is surrendered to a group posing as CIA personnel, who drive away with him moments before the actual CIA officers arrive. When the MI5 team realise their mistake, they give chase. Coaver is pushed out of the rear of the speeding van during the pursuit and subsequently dies on the street. The CIA applies pressure on Home Secretary William Towers (Simon Russell Beale), as they believe Harry to be directly responsible for Coaver's death. They demand Harry be handed over to CIA custody for extradition to the United States. Harry urgently requests that Towers bring the signing of the agreement forward as quickly as possible.

== Plot ==
Elena approaches Towers's security advisor Ruth Evershed (Nicola Walker), claiming knowledge of an impending attack, the details of which she will only divulge to Harry Pearce. However, he is scheduled for immediate deportation to the United States. Ruth relays this information to her former teammates at Section D. Section chief Erin Watts (Lara Pulver), case officer Dimitri Levendis (Max Brown) and analyst Calum Reed (Geoffrey Streatfeild) decide to illegally break Harry out of CIA custody and escape to an abandoned Ministry of Defence bunker, where they meet with Ruth, Elena and Sasha. Harry interrogates Elena, who admits she does not know the details, but it has been planned by her handlers, Russian politicians who view their government is becoming too weak, and that a partnership with the UK would be embarrassing. However Elena does recall a telephone number, leading Dimitri and Erin to an address. There they find a picture of a man in a jammed paper shredder. Elena recognises the man as Pavel Zykov (Andrew Byron), a Russian ultranationalist.

Zykov is on board a flight from Moscow bound for London. It is believed he will carry out a suicide mission by exploding the plane over London. Such an action may push Russia and the UK into war. Using a device smuggled onto the aircraft, Zykov jams all communications from the plane, and with no other choice Harry and Towers decide to shoot down the plane before it can reach UK airspace, where debris could cause civilian casualties on the ground. However Ruth suspects Elena is lying about the bomb. In further interrogations Elena admits that during the time Harry ran her in the 1980s, she was already working for the KGB, and in fact recruited Harry without him knowing it by making him fall in love with her, and by falsely claiming that Sasha is his son.

Ruth becomes convinced Elena wants the plane to be shot down, since it is a Russian airline flight full of civilians, and a British air strike upon it would infuriate the Russian government, ending the partnership negotiations. As Towers meets with the Cabinet Office Briefing Room (COBRA) and sends Eurofighters to intercept the plane, Ruth persuades Harry to make Elena tell him the truth. Harry resorts to threatening to kill Sasha in order to gauge her reaction. It becomes clear that Elena is willing to sacrifice her son to complete her mission. Convinced it was her plan to force the shooting down of the passenger plane, Henry instructs Towers to abort the mission, however Towers is not convinced. Harry solicits the help of Gavrik, who agrees but only on the condition that he be put in the same room as Elena. When this is granted, Gavrik threatens Towers with military action against the UK unless the attack is aborted. With seconds to spare, Towers complies, averting disaster. The plane goes on to land safely at Heathrow Airport with Zykov arrested.

After confronting his wife, Gavrik locks the door and strangles Elena to death. Sasha is unable to stop it. Meanwhile, Ruth joins Harry outside the bunker, and they both decide to leave the intelligence service and live together. However Sasha, armed with a large piece of broken glass and blaming Harry for his mother's death, tries to stab him. Ruth intervenes and is stabbed instead. She dies from her injuries before help can arrive, leaving Harry to mourn the loss of his love. In a telephone conversation with Towers sometime later, it is evident that Harry is considering leaving the service. It also becomes clear that Harry has engaged an outside agency to assassinate Mikhail Levrov (Jeffry Wickham) and his co-conspirators. Towers requests he not be informed of the details of these actions. Tom Quinn (Matthew Macfadyen) is shown walking into Levrov's house for an appointment with him. Harry is then seen entering the memorial area of Thames House with the names of all the MI5 officers who died in service, some of whom were characters who were killed during the series (Helen Flynn, Danny Hunter, Fiona Carter, Colin Wells, Zafar Younis, Ben Kaplan, Adam Carter, Jo Portman, Ros Myers, Tariq Masood, Ruth Evershed). He then walks onto the Grid, sits down at his desk and answers the phone, indicating he intends to continue working in the service.

== Production ==
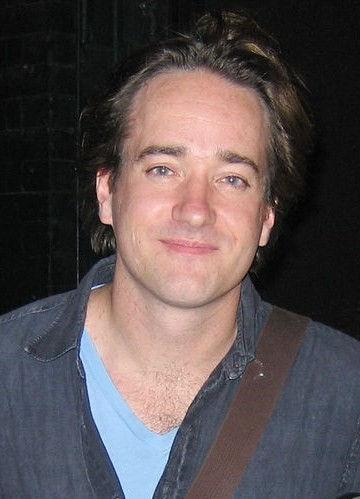
Matthew Macfadyen returns as Tom Quinn, a previous main character who left the show in its third year in 2004.

During the writing stage of the tenth series, lead writers Jonathan Brackley and Sam Vincent knew of the strong possibility it was going to be the last series, so the two were looking for ways to infuse their scripts with a sense of finality. When the decision to end the show was made definite by Kudos Film and Television, the production company behind Spooks, Brackley and Vincents were given enough time to plot a true conclusion to the show. They stated "by the time we began to write the final ep, we knew it would be the last".

They also felt that writing the final episodes of a popular programme was "an exciting responsibility, a daunting honour". They also did not want to end it on a cliffhanger, as doing so wouldn't be right or fair to the fans. The writers also concluded the Ruth/Harry arc in the series. They were concerned that there were fans of the show "who will be immensely cheesed off if they get anything less than Ruth riding in on a unicorn to marry Harry in a white suit", but noted there were "plenty of viewers who love the uncompromising toughness of Spooks. And both viewpoints were always well represented around the table". When it came to writing the final scenes, both writers went through "countless" ideas, some of which were pondered for weeks before making their final decision. In an interview, both writers admitted that the finale "can't please everyone", but that they tried to create an ending that was faithful to the spirit of Spooks. When filming concluded, cast and crew members were "bagsying" items from the Grid set, including a large "Regnum Defende" insignia.

In the week before the broadcast of the episode, the newspaper the Daily Mirror revealed that Matthew Macfadyen would return in a cameo appearance as Tom Quinn. Tom was the head of Section D in the first two series and then was decommissioned from MI5 in series three, after which he started a private security firm. A series insider said that the character would only be seen "fleetingly" in the episode. The insider also said "It will bring back all the memories of Tom and what the character endured in those first few series." However, at the time it was not revealed why the character returns

== Broadcast and reception ==
=== Broadcast and ratings ===
The series ten finale was first transmitted on BBC One on Sunday, 23 October 2011 from 9 pm. According to preliminary overnight figures, the finale was seen by 5.13 million viewers, with an 18.4 per cent audience share. As far as overnights are concerned, ratings for Spooks saw a significant increase of 750,000 from episode five, and over half a million higher from the series premiere. However, as in other episodes of the last series, the final episode was again trounced in the same slot by an episode of the ITV1 period drama Downton Abbey, which was seen by almost nine million.

=== Critical reception ===
"Some will undoubtedly be disappointed that the ending wasn’t a happy one, but as the lead writers hinted in our recent interview, such a climax just wouldn’t have been in keeping with the show’s legacy; it wouldn’t have been Spooks. We’re just gutted that it has to end at all."

— Jonathan Angwin, CultBox

The series finale received generally positive reactions from critics. Susie Boniface of the Daily Mirror called the finale "worth tuning in", stating the series "played a blinder with their swan song". She said that "there's everything you'd expect - terrorist threats, Harry being quietly furious, Ruth being loyal and a Home Secretary who makes you shout at the telly as Britain comes close to annihilation again", although "sadly it's also got the things I've come to hate in Spooks", citing the "duller-than-a-day-old-sandwich" Dimitri, and "ridiculous lady spook Erin Watts in her four-inch heels". Despite this, Firth's acting was praised, and she stated that the finale was "brilliant because it goes back to what it was always best at... looking at the lives of the people who became spooks". Jonathan Angwin of CultBox rated the finale five out of five, calling it a "spectacular tour de force of an episode, never before has the ending of a British television programme been so perfectly executed". Angwin however noted that Elena's false confession was a "terrible move" and did not get the point of Sasha's role despite the actor's strong performance, as he was "impossible to sympathise with" and was "a little irritating". Despite this the reviewer believed that the terror plot, Elena's interrogation, and the realisation Harry and Ruth would not have a happy ending proved "the final hour of Spooks is easily one of its finest".

The Guardian published two separate reviews. Vicky Frost found the plane plot "less compelling" than the rest of the episode, though she "particularly likes" the idea of Dimitri and Erin breaking Harry out of CIA custody despite believing that this development rendered much of the fifth episode "largely pointless". Frost also praised Walker's performance as Ruth throughout the episode, but admitted to seeing her demise coming, though she felt the circumstances that led to Ruth's death "did give the far more satisfying ending" and the moments between Ruth and Harry were "excellently done". She also opined on Macfadyen's cameo return as Tom Quinn, "it made no sense at all. Obviously it was super cheesy. But obviously I completely loved it – despite knowing it was coming". Sam Wollaston stated the episode "was like the climax of an indulgent 70s heavy metal track, all banging drums and screaming guitars, licks and twists, and you think that's it, but then there's a bit more, all turned up to 11". Wollaston enjoyed the "incessant high action – stabbing, strangling, scrambling, unscrambling", as well as "revelation after revelation, fired from an automatic weapon". He also said to have been "physically and emotionally drained" watching the episode, concluding the review with "If Spooks is "crap", as John le Carré says, then crap doesn't get much better".

"It all ended in double-dares, unblinking poker-faces trying to out-bluff each other and, where all else failed, a big jab with a bit of glass. Along with Harry, we were left to gaze at a conveniently placed memorial to all those lost over a decade of service to BBC primetime drama, and ruminate once again on the dilemma that is the backbone of this fine, sometimes silly, but always well-intended drama - that of the increasingly distant prospect of ever being both a good spy, and a happy man."

— Caroline Frost, The Huffington Post

Rob McLaughlin of Den of Geek called it "one of the most gripping and compelling finales to a series since Ashes To Ashes" as it was "brimmed with character moments, some superb action, and a conclusion that really was both shocking and heart breaking", McLaughlin has said he will "mourn the passing of one of BBC's best dramas". Benji Wilson of The Daily Telegraph rated the episode three and a half out of five, stating "there was so little solid ground to stand on that things started getting a little Electric Kool-Aid", though "normality returned with the death of Ruth". Wilson also praised Walker's performance. Tom Sutcliff of The Independent stated "Spooks has often relished the pleasure of a good explosion in the past, but it declined to go out on one", adding "instead, almost wistfully, it added one last victim to its long roster of in-house sacrifices". Caroline Frost in The Huffington Post said "in many respects, Spooks finally did what it has forgotten to do recently, and something it always used to do best [...] deal with an unprecedented random and enormous threat".

Nick Bryan of Dork Adore found that the tension was built well enough, but found himself "wishing for more scale and heart-stopping drama in the finale". Furthermore, Bryan believed that the series nine finale would have made a more fitting end to the series. Christopher Hootan stated "it was with great trepidation that I sat down to watch the show's finale, which promised to put you so far on the edge of your seat as to find your nose touching the TV screen. And it did not disappoint". Hootan added "as ever this was suitably peril-ridden with plenty of last minute airstrikes and time-sensitive interrogations, but the real tension lay with the fate of everyone's favourite po-faced head of operations, Harry Pearce". With the Harry and Ruth storyline, the reviewer noted that the non-happy ending "will annoy some", but found Ruth's death "a captivating bit of TV as Harry was left with the deaths of two past loves on his conscience".
