= Sean Bobbitt =

British cinematographer

- Born: Sean Francis Bobbitt; Corpus Christi, Texas, U.S.
- Occupation: Cinematographer
- Years active: 1988–present

Sean Francis Bobbitt, B.S.C. is a British cinematographer, known for his collaborations with directors Steve McQueen and Nia DaCosta. He was nominated for the Academy Award for Best Cinematography for his work on Judas and the Black Messiah (2021). For Sense & Sensibility (2008), he was nominated for the Primetime Emmy Award for Outstanding Cinematography for a Limited or Anthology Series or Movie.

== Filmography ==
=== Film ===
Year	Title	Director	Notes
1999	Wonderland	Michael Winterbottom	
2001	Lawless Heart	Tom Hunsinger; Neil Hunter	
2002	Summer Things	Michel Blanc	
2006	Cargo	Clive Gordon	
2006	The Situation	Philip Haas	
2007	The Baker	Gareth Lewis	
2007	Mrs Ratcliffe's Revolution	Bille Eltringham	
2008	Hunger	Steve McQueen	
2010	Africa United	Debs Gardner-Paterson	
2011	Shame	Steve McQueen	
2011	Hysteria	Tanya Wexler	
2012	Everyday	Michael Winterbottom	With Annenarie Lean-Vercoe, James Clark, Simon Tindall and Marcel Zyskind
2012	The Place Beyond the Pines	Derek Cianfrance	
2012	Byzantium	Neil Jordan	
2013	12 Years a Slave	Steve McQueen	
2013	Oldboy	Spike Lee	
2014	Kill the Messenger	Michael Cuesta	
2015	Rock the Kasbah	Barry Levinson	
2016	Queen of Katwe	Mira Nair	
2017	On Chesil Beach	Dominic Cooke	
2017	Stronger	David Gordon Green	
2018	Widows	Steve McQueen	
2020	The Courier	Dominic Cooke	
2020	The Rhythm Section	Reed Morano	
2021	Judas and the Black Messiah	Shaka King	
2023	The Marvels	Nia DaCosta	
2025	Hedda	Nia DaCosta	
2026	28 Years Later: The Bone Temple	Nia DaCosta	

Documentary film

Year	Title	Director
2012	Trashed	Candida Brady

=== Television ===
Miniseries

Year	Title	Director	Notes
1994	Watergate	Mick Gold	Documentary series
1998	Ancient Inventions	Daniel Percival; Phil Grabsky	Documentary series
2003	Canterbury Tales	Marc Munden; Julian Jarrold	Episodes "The Knight's Tale" and "The Man of Law's Tale"
2004	The Long Firm	Bille Eltringham	
2008	Sense and Sensibility	John Alexander	
2009	Unforgiven	David Evans	
2016	Codes of Conduct	Steve McQueen	

TV movies

Year	Title	Director
2001	The Life and Adventures of Nicholas Nickleby	Stephen Whittaker
2001	Sweet Revenge	David Morrissey
2002	Jeffrey Archer: The Truth	Guy Jenkin
2003	Second Generation	Jon Sen

TV series

Year	Title	Director	Note
2002	Spooks	Rob Bailey	Episodes "One Last Dance" and "Traitor's Gate"

== Awards and nominations ==
Year	Title	Awards/Nominations
2013	12 Years a Slave	Independent Spirit Award for Best Cinematography; St. Louis Gateway Film Critics Association Award for Best Cinematography; Nominated – ASC Award for Outstanding Achievement in Cinematography; Nominated – BAFTA Award for Best Cinematography; Nominated – Chicago Film Critics Association Award for Best Cinematography; Nominated – Critics' Choice Movie Award for Best Cinematography; Nominated – Dallas–Fort Worth Film Critics Association Award for Best Cinematography; Nominated – Houston Film Critics Society Award for Best Cinematography; Nominated – National Society of Film Critics Award for Best Cinematography; Nominated – Online Film Critics Society Award for Best Cinematography; Nominated – San Francisco Film Critics Circle Award for Best Cinematography; Nominated – Satellite Award for Best Cinematography; Nominated – Washington D.C. Area Film Critics Award for Best Cinematography
2021	Judas and the Black Messiah	Nominated – Academy Award for Best Cinematography; Nominated – BAFTA Award for Best Cinematography; Nominated – Black Reel Award for Outstanding Cinematography
