= Nest of Angels =

- Spooks episode
- Episode no.: Series 2 Episode 2
- Directed by: Bharat Nalluri
- Written by: Howard Brenton
- Original air dates: 2 June 2003 (BBC Three); 9 June 2003 (BBC One)
- Running time: 59 minutes

Guest appearances
- Jenny Agutter as Tessa Phillips; Qarie Marshall as Mohammed Rachid; Alexander Siddig as Muhammed Ibhn Khaldun; San Shella as Johnny Patel; Roshan Seth as Fazul Azzam; Taahir Husain as Abu Hassan; Praveen Sond as Aminah; Sam Bond as Vinny; Lucy O'Connell as Doctor; Simon Snashall as CID Officer; Kammy Darweish as Mr Hussain

Episode chronology
← Previous "Legitimate Targets"	Next → "Spiders"
- Spooks (series 2)

"Nest of Angels" is the second episode of the second series of the British espionage television series Spooks, and the eighth episode overall. It was originally broadcast on BBC Three on 2 June 2003, and repeated on frontline channel BBC One on 9 June. The episode was written by Howard Brenton, and directed by Bharat Nalluri. The episode centres on MI5's actions in stopping Muhammed Rachid (Qarie Marshall), a radicalised mullah in a mosque and community centre in Birmingham, who they believe is recruiting young suicide bombers. After their previous asset is discovered and brutally expelled, the team turn to Muhammed Ibhn Khaldun (Alexander Siddig), an Algerian agent who left his country to work with the British.

Brenton came up with the idea to show an episode dealing with a Muslim hero set out to stop a group of Islamic terrorists. Brenton and the producers researched elements of Islam in order to provide a balanced view towards the religion, as well as the nature of the plot and to show Muslims in the episode who oppose the extremists among their religion. Although much of the episode was set in Birmingham, it was filmed entirely in London. The episode sees the introduction of regular character Ruth Evershed (Nicola Walker), and the return of Christine Dale (Megan Dodds), who first appeared in the first episode and returned so that the character's role can be expanded.

The episode was seen by 7.87 million following its broadcast on BBC One, however, despite the measures used to provide the balanced view, it was met with considerable controversy from Muslims, among them the Muslim Council of Britain, for fear that the episode would incite Islamophobia. Nearly a thousand complaints were made, although cast and crew members argued that the Muslims who opposed the episode did not understand the context.

== Plot ==
MI5 plant an asset Johnny Patel (San Shella) at the Parkmount mosque and community centre in Birmingham to follow Muhammed Rachid, an Afghan-born mullah who is acting more hostile to the West. Johnny however, is discovered to be a spy, and is thrown to the surveillance van outside as a result. Tom Quinn (Matthew Macfadyen) questions him in hospital, learning that the mullah is recruiting suicide bombers, however the stress of the questioning results in a cerebral hemorrhage. Superior Harry Pearce (Peter Firth) pressures Tom to find another agent. He turns to Tessa Phillips (Jenny Agutter), now a manager at a security firm since she was fired in the first series finale for running phantom agents for monetary gain. However, she refuses to help.

Later, new officer Ruth Evershed, transferred from Government Communications Headquarters (GCHQ), informs the team that Metropolitan Police have arrested Muhammed Ibhn Khaldun, an Algerian secret service agent. After his release Khaldun reveals that since the death of his family, he desired to leave Algeria to work for British intelligence, so he fooled his agency into believing he was killed while stopping a jihadist group in France, before smuggling himself into England via a Channel Tunnel freight train. The team allow him to work undercover in Parkmount, posing as a labourer at the local university, where he quickly gains Rachid's trust. Beforehand however, Khaldun removes all the surveillance equipment on him. Furthermore, news of Khaldun's arrival also gains the interest of the Central Intelligence Agency (CIA), who also wish to use him.

In the meantime, Danny Hunter (David Oyelowo) persuades Tom to go on a date with Vicky Westbrook (Natasha Little), a nurse introduced in the previous episode, in order to get over Ellie Simm, Tom's previous girlfriend who broke up with him. Although Tom asks her out for dinner, the two end up having sex. Zoe Reynolds (Keeley Hawes) continues seeing Carlo Franceschini (Enzo Cilenti), also introduced in the previous episode, at a bar.

When Khaldun fails to meet with Tom, the team worry that he had deceived them. However, that night, Khaldun sneaks into Tom's bedroom at the university campus, and warns him that Rachid is keeping explosives, and a suicide attack will take place the next day, but will not disclose where. Tom turns to Parkmount's imam Fazul Azzam Roshan Seth, who opposes Rachid's radicalised views. After learning Fazzul's daughter Aminah (Praveen Sond) is involved, he forces her into revealing the location of the planned attack. Rachid is placed under arrest when explosives are found in his prayer room. Khaldun meanwhile, kills Rachid's men in an empty building, and attempts to disarm the bomber, young Abu Hassan (Taahir Husein), but he runs away into a playground. As Tom's team and local police surround the playground, Khaldun attempts to talk Abu out of the attack. However, when he fails, Khaldun throws himself as Abu detonates the bomb, in order to avoid further casualties. Later, CIA liaison Christine Dale voices disappointment towards Khaldun's death, but appears grateful that Tom is unharmed.

== Production ==
=== Writing ===
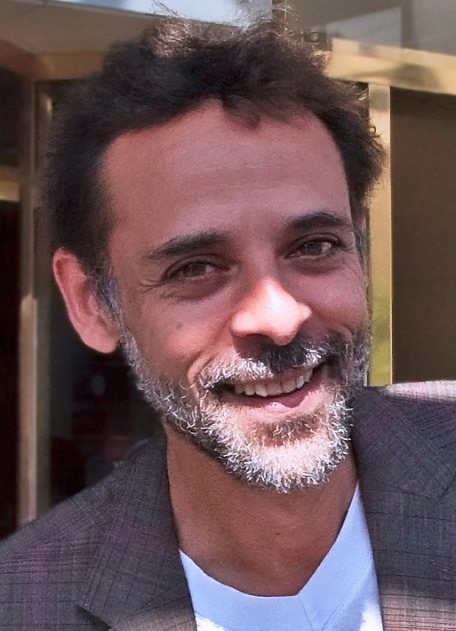
Alexander Siddig plays the Muslim hero, Muhammed Ibhn Khaldun.

The story idea came from writer Howard Brenton, who wanted to delve into the world of suicide bombings, a significant issue in national security. It became the first episode in Spooks that explicitly portrays Islamic extremism, which Oyelowo described as a "hot potato" because of this sensitive issue. The actor was also worried that the plot may "put ideas into people's heads" after the audience would watch the episode. Brenton heavily researched the episode to provide a balanced view. He included characters, such as innocent Muslims who opposed the Islamic extremists, as well as a "Muslim hero" who would thwart the terrorists. The writer still wrote "Nest of Angels" as a classic spy story, where an operative goes undercover to subvert a villainous operation. Director Bharat Nalluri felt that making the hero a Muslim exemplified the balanced view. Series creator David Wolstencroft meanwhile, emphasised that the episode not only showed Islamic extremism, but a more peaceful side of the religion as well, and that the producers should not shy away from those issues.

To further provide the fair and balanced view of the topic, script editor Karen Wilson furthered her research by consulting with a Muslim advisor throughout the scripting and filming stages, as well as consulting the Muslims who played extras in the episode. Although Wilson does not usually talk to cast members beforehand, it was the first time she became aware of the research and advice behind a storyline, and felt that the advice she was given was useful in staging the scenes. It was also based on real life instances, something that Brenton considered a hallmark of the series, as many episodes are based on such events. News stories detailing similar instances to the plot came out sometime after the episode's broadcast, and the producers believed it justified the episode. The ending was written to be melancholic, in which there were no winners.

In writing the pre-title sequence of the episode, Brenton wanted to include a "frightening thriller set up" where spies would listen in as an agent is undercover, and be absolutely helpless to aid the agent when he is in trouble, yet be nearby as this happens. He also wanted the audience to admire the villains, especially from the conversation between Tom and Rachid. Furthermore, the episode exemplifies Tom's brutality in his professional life; in one scene Tom questions Johnny who is recovering in hospital, but came to want the information more than care for his wellbeing.

The episode also further explores the Grid characters' private lives, however some of the ideas had to be dropped due to the amount of plot towards the main storyline. "Nest of Angels" continues the relationship between Tom and Vicky Westbrook which began in the previous episode. Vicky was included more in the episode, and it further delved into her personality, namely she differs vastly from Ellie Simm, Tom's previous girlfriend, who was depicted as more of a normal human being; Vicky was portrayed as more "flakey" and "insane" who would often wrongfoot Tom. The producers also decided to introduce a potential relationship between Danny and Sam Buxton (Shauna Macdonald). However, the idea was dropped later in the series as it "never seemed to click."

=== Casting ===
"That was the beginning of a particular crusade of mine. The first of a series of characters in which I have tried to explore that element of academic Arabs who are disenfranchised by the modern militant wave, whose ideas of Islam have been completely usurped by a much more vocal youth and the various clerics. To me, [Khaldun] represents old Islam, where you can shake someone's hand or have a whiskey and talk about whatever."

— Alexander Siddig describing the character

The episode included a guest appearance from Alexander Siddig, who played the "Muslim hero" Muhammed Ibhn Khaldun. Siddig was already well known as playing regular character Julian Bashir in Star Trek: Deep Space Nine. The producers viewed Siddig as a "noble" actor when he was playing the character. Siddig described the role as a "godsend" to him, because it enabled him to "portray various aspects of an Arab man who was readily credible. He came out of a new identity I was looking for, trying to take a snapshot of this guy before he disappears. He was my father. He was your father. He was the father of all the generations that had a liberal upbringing and didn't make a lot of money." Roshan Seth played imam Fazul Azzam; he was cast because Brenton wanted him to appear in the episode. Meanwhile, Taahir Husain played the bomber Abu Hassan. The producers felt that the child actor was "a find" for them; it was his first television appearance, but they believed his performance "carried it off."

The episode also marks the return of American actress Megan Dodds, who first appeared in a handful of scenes in the first episode of the first series. The producers enjoyed the actress' company, and wanted her to return where the character would appear more often and developed throughout the second series. Jenny Agutter returns as Tessa Philips; it allows the audience to see what happens to her since her sacking in the first series finale. The episode introduces new regular character Ruth Evershed, played by Nicola Walker. The producers needed another "interesting, strong" member of the team following Tessa's departure. The character also came from GCHQ in the series; the producers were aware that the organisation employs 70,000 people, and the producers did not want to ignore this aspect of British intelligence gathering. Describing Walker's casting, producer Jane Featherstone recalled "Nicola is extraordinary in it. I think she's completely brilliant. And she's developed that and I think once Nicola became that role that writers had just loved writing for that part, and she's really made it her own." The character was created by Brenton. Her introduction depicted her as clumsy, mirroring the writer.

=== Filming and soundtrack ===
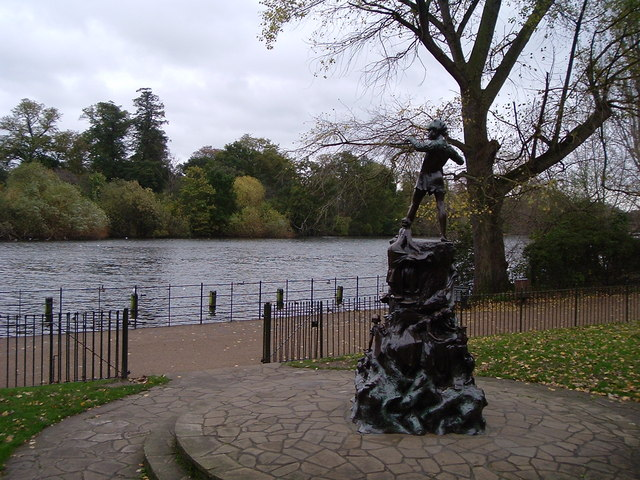
The Peter Pan statue in Kensington Gardens was used in a scene in the episode.

The episode was directed Bharat Nalluri; he continued to portray a balanced approach towards Muslims during filming. Although much of the episode was set in Birmingham, it was all filmed in London. The mosque interior was shot at the basement of a building in Portland Place, while another street of terraced houses was used to double a typical residential street in the city. One of its most best looking houses doubled the home of Fazul and Aminah. Other scenes were shot in Kensington Gardens, with one of them being filmed in front of the park's Peter Pan statue. The scenes leading up to Abu's suicide attack was filmed at a playground. The scenes were originally set to be shot at a shopping centre, but it was deemed "unfilmable." Producers later considered using a bus, but they thought that too was impractical. The final scenes of the episode were shot at the shore of the River Thames near the National Film Theatre, which houses a beach during low tide. The shootout scene between Khaldun and Rachid's men was among the last to be shot. In addition, the producers made use of actual news footage following a suicide attack in Israel, in order to show the audience the consequences of such attacks.

Filming the pre-title sequence went through some alterations. One of the scenes saw Johnny being foot whipped, however the shot where the stick struck the soles of the feet was cut out due to its brutality. Also, when discussing how Johnny would be expelled from the mosque afterwards, Nalluri suggested using the idea where he is thrown to the top of the surveillance van, which would give the audience the impression that the antagonists were on to them. Later on in the episode, Nalluri wanted to include some exposition shots, which shows Khaldun's actions while he narrates them to MI5. In one scene, Tom observes Khaldun inside a prison cell by opening a slide view at the prison door. However one had to be made because no such doors exist in the United Kingdom. Following the broadcast of the episode, the producers were surprised to hear that the BBC were unhappy with a scene showing Harry holding a Costa Coffee cup, as the corporation believed it was done out of product placement. They were also surprised to learn that they did not take notice in a scene with Malcolm Wynn-Jones delightfully eating a piece of chocolate from a Black Magic chocolate box, which they thought was a more obvious example. Portraying actor Hugh Simon had to spit out the chocolate after the take as he disliked the confectionery.

The episode's soundtrack was composed by Jennie Muskett, who also composed for the series. When reviewing the scenes leading to the conclusion she felt sympathetic towards the suicide bomber, and wanted to portray the background music through the bomber's point of view. Muskett also hired vocalist Paul Gladstone-Reed to become the voice behind his emotions. In addition, regular pieces of the soundtrack were reused throughout much of the episode. Muskett saw the episode as among the most rewarding she worked on.

== Broadcast and reception ==
"Nest of Angels" was first broadcast on digital channel BBC Three from 10:30 p.m. on 2 June 2003, following the first episode of the second series on BBC One. The BBC One repeat of the episode was broadcast on 9 June, between 9 and 10 p.m. According to overnight figures, ratings were down by 200,000 from the previous episode, with an average of 7.6 million viewers and a third of the audience share for BBC One, peaking at 7.8 million. Spooks won its timeslot against the other terrestrial channels. The final numbers posted on the Broadcasters' Audience Research Board website went up slightly to 7.87 million viewers, making the episode the fifth most viewed BBC One broadcast, and the thirteenth most viewed broadcast in total the week it aired.

=== Controversy ===
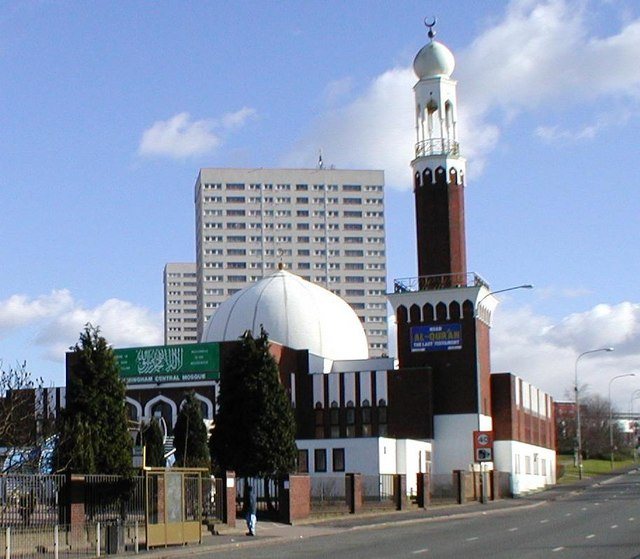
After the episode's broadcast, the Birmingham Central Mosque was vandalised with the slogan "suicide bombers inside" in graffiti, allegedly as a result to the episode's subject matter. In response, the BBC stated "We haven't received any information that this incident is in any way related to the transmission of Spooks."

The episode gained a considerable amount of controversy, largely by Muslims who believed the episode showed Islam in a negative light, and that it could incite Islamophobia. Following the broadcast of the episode on BBC Three, the BBC received around 800 complaints, of which 500 of them were telephone calls, and 300 were emails, and a further 150 complaints were made after the BBC One repeat, totalling nearly one thousand complaints. The complaints made on its original broadcast appealed to the BBC not to repeat it on BBC One. The corporation chose not to drop the episode from the schedules. However, since fewer complaints were made after the repeat, members of the broadcasters believed that viewers realised the content was not as bad as expected. Inayat Bunglawala, the media secretary for the Muslim Council of Britain, stated "We can't deny that the BBC have a right to screen a drama about this – it is topical," but "It is the treatment of the subject that will lead to attacks."

Following the episode, a Muslim student in Birmingham was assaulted by two attackers, who said "you have been spooked." Furthermore, the Birmingham Central Mosque was vandalised, with the slogan "suicide bombers inside – kill the bombers" in graffiti. The BBC however denied that the episode had influence on the incidents, and West Midlands Police ruled that there was no evidence linking the attacks to the programme. The BBC further defended the episode, by stating the Muslim involvement towards making it, and that it does not suggest that mosques breed terrorists. In July 2003, the Broadcasting Standards Commission dismissed some of the complaints as the episode was presented as a drama and not a factual account.

In the Friday before the BBC One repeat, Bunglawala wrote to Lorraine Heggessey, the BBC One controller, stating "the programme, which was of a very sensational nature, unfortunately only serves to reinforce many negative stereotypes of British Muslims. Instead of being a well-informed piece of film-making, this episode of Spooks pandered to grossly offensive and Islamophobic caricatures of imams, Muslim students and mosques," and warned that the "increased amount of Islamophobia that is sure to result from the broadcasting of this programme at peak-time is wholly unacceptable and a gross violation of your responsibilities as a public service broadcaster." Heggessey however, argued that the episode presented a balance view and that it fell "legitimately within the story lines of Spooks." Also, Ahtsham Ali of the Islamic Society of Britain claimed that the episode "adds fuel to the fire of already negative perceptions of Muslims and fans the flames of British National Party rhetoric."

The controversy invoked responses from some cast and crew members from the series. Gareth Neame, the executive producer for the BBC was glad that the episode provoked debate, and the producers would adequately defend the episode from their research into making the story. That said Neame was also surprised by some of the responses, rationalising that those responders did not understand the context, and that it was not intended to offend anybody. Stephen Garrett, the director of Kudos Film and Television, the producer of Spooks agreed, further stating that the episode "deals with very real stuff that's happening in the world. It touches nerves on a regular basis, and deals with uncomfortable truths." Brenton meanwhile stated that "people are free to make what they want of drama," and believed the audience did not like the villains as they portrayed something disturbing in their culture, religion, world or profession. Oyelowo had said that the episode did not say that all Muslims are terrorists, only that some fanatics can give "millions of good people a bad name." The actor also believed that the Muslims who were "up in arms" about the story did not see the episode, but merely heard the basis of the plot and did not consider the Muslims in the episode who tried to stop the antagonists.
