= Sond =

Sond may refer to:

- Sensor (a.k.a. detector or probe)
- SOND, abbreviation for Strengthening Our Nation's Democracy, movement motivated by the 1984 book, Strong Democracy
- Tarunpreet Singh Sond (fl. 2020s), Indian politician
- Praveen Sond, actress in "Nest of Angels", a 2003 episode of the TV series Spooks
- Sond., taxonomic author abbreviation of Otto Wilhelm Sonder (1812–1881), German botanist

== See also ==
- Sound (disambiguation)
