= One Last Dance (Spooks) =

- Spooks episode
- Episode no.: Series 1 Episode 3
- Directed by: Rob Bailey
- Written by: Simon Mirren
- Editing by: Colin Green
- Production code: 103
- Original air date: 27 May 2002

Guest appearances
- Christopher Fulford as Johnny Marks; Katie Jones as Leyla Bakhuri; Karzan Krekar as Serka; Ray Panthaki as Chalak Bakhuri; Oliver Haden as Sonay; Kevork Malikyan as Ozan Cosar; Fisun Burgess as Selin Cosar; Donald Pirie as PC Steven Burrows; Ralph Ineson as Sam Walker; Steven Gartie as Stan; Rory MacGregor as Colin Wells; Jeremy Bulloch as Roger Welks; Beth Vyse as Tara Welks

Episode chronology
← Previous "Looking After Our Own"	Next → "Traitor's Gate"
- Spooks (series 1)

"One Last Dance" is the third episode in the first series of the British television series Spooks. It first aired on BBC One in the United Kingdom on 27 June 2002. It was written by Simon Mirren, and directed by Rob Bailey. In the episode, Kurdish rebels raid a Turkish Consulate while Zoe Reynolds (Keeley Hawes) is performing a routine bugging operation there. The raid is later revealed to be a distraction by a rogue faction group. The episode's plot is based on the Iranian Embassy Siege in 1980. After the original broadcast, it was seen by over 7 million viewers in the UK.

== Plot ==
The episode begins with Tessa (Jenny Agutter) being followed by Johnny Marks (Christopher Fulford), a former asset and lover of Tessa who was thought to have been killed in a car bomb in Northern Ireland. Marks then visits his group, who are running Kurdish rebels. Zoe goes to the Turkish Consulate on a routine bugging operation, by posing as a date for a Turkish travel agent. During the operation, Marks's men and the rebels seize the consulate; Zoe is able to warn Section D of the threat, and the team are called in, including Tom (Matthew Macfadyen), who is to celebrate his birthday with Ellie (Esther Hall). The rebels strap the Turkish Consul with explosives on a balcony, and demand the release of their imprisoned paramilitaries from the Turkish government in exchange for the hostages.

While Tom plays negotiator, Tessa recognises Marks from CCTV and comes forward to Harry (Peter Firth). There, he learns that Marks once followed Harry to a secret bank containing the identities of every MI5 and MI6 officer, and is using the consulate raid as a distraction to break into the bank, which is in the same row of buildings. Furthermore, Tara Welks, the daughter of bank owner Roger Welks (Jeremy Bulloch), is kidnapped. While Malcolm (Hugh Simon) and Colin (Rory MacGregor) create a fake news report detailing the release of the paramilitaries to the rebels, the Consul gets an asthma attack. The rebel leader, Leyla Bakhuri (Katie Jones) agrees to release Zoe in exchange for an inhaler. During the exchange, a team led by Danny (David Oyelowo) break into the vault and engage in a firefight with Marks's men; the gunfire alerts the rebel, who shoots Tom in the abdomen, wounding him, before the rebel is killed by a sniper. Tara is found, but Marks disappears. In the meantime, armed Police enter the consulate and arrest the rebels.

Marks reappears in Tessa's house, and learns that during their time together, Tessa became pregnant with his child, until the baby died from a miscarriage. They then receive a phone call from Harry, who asks Marks to meet with him in the street below; Marks, who claims to have never broken his word, promises not to release the identities if MI5 do not stop him. Before leaving, it is revealed that it was his brother who died in the car bomb and that Harry had been the one to set the bomb intended for him. Although he agrees to the deal, Harry warns Marks that, should any of the names be compromised, he would find him and kill him. At the end of the episode, Tessa finds that Marks has left the disc with the identities behind.

== Production ==
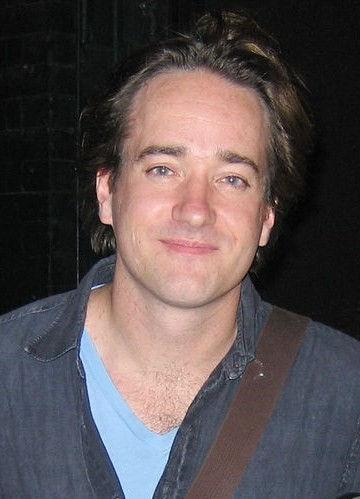
Matthew Macfadyen suffered from red eye during the filming of the episode.

The storyline to "One Last Dance" was somewhat based on the Iranian Embassy Siege, which took place in London in May 1980. Writer Simon Mirren noted the episode was hard to write, since he had to add two main storylines and tie them together - the Consulate siege and the bank robbery. Mirren was concerned that adding too much dialogue explaining certain aspects of the storyline would make the episode "silly". In the original pitch of the consulate siege, the terrorists were to abseil down from the roof, but was changed in favour of a ground assault. The police officer in the consulate, Steven Burrows, was originally written to conceal a gun, and feeling guilty about never using it, but was cut.

Katie Jones was cast as Leyla, one of the episode's primary antagonists; Jones was cast because the producers were impressed by her performance, and the accent she used during the audition. Some of the opening scenes were to involve the rebels speaking Kurdish, but out of the cast members who play the rebels, Karzan Krekar was the only one who could speak it; Krekar taught the other members how to speak their lines in Kurdish. There was some concern that too much Kurdish was spoken in the scenes, which the producers feared would draw away the audience; some of the dialogue was cut down for filming. Furthermore, some of the additional scenes with Kurdish being spoken was actually improvised. An actual news anchor from London Today was cast for the news reports in the background; the producers used an actual anchor to make the report more believable.

The episode was filmed after the following episode, "Traitor's Gate". Filming took two weeks to complete. The methods of Marks following Tessa in the beginning of the episode was suggested by an ex-MI5 officer, who was a source for the series. Director Rob Bailey taught Keeley Hawes how to lockpick a door for Zoe's operation. Parts of the episode was filmed where Matthew Macfadyen wore sunglasses. The reasoning is that Macfadyen burst a blood vessel on one of his eyes, and the sunglasses were used to hide it; they would be used again for episode 5, "The Rose Bed Memoirs". The Turkish Consulate were filmed in two separate locations; the interior was mainly filmed in a local council building, while the exterior was filmed in a building in Roehampton. Three camera crews were used on the exterior shots.

Three hours of filming was dedicated on the top floor of New Zealand House with Macfadyen, Firth and Jeremy Bulloch. However, they filmed the scene at the top of the building, where heavy wind took place; the actors on set had to raise their voices in order for the sound unit to hear them. This is the first episode in which David Oyelowo used a gun. All guns used in the episode are real, but decommissioned from service. In order to maintain gun safety, at least two weapons experts were on hand to train the actors during rehearsal. The moment where the rebel is killed by the sniper was meant to include blood spatter for realism, but was cut because the producers thought it would be too violent.

== Reception ==
The episode was originally broadcast on BBC One, during the 9 pm to 10 pm time slot on Monday, 27 May 2002. After its original broadcast, the episode received unofficial overnight viewing figures of 7 million, and was the best performer in prime-time. However, ratings were down over two million from the series premiere, due to competition from The Kumars at No. 42 on BBC Two and film premieres on Channel 5. According to the Broadcasters' Audience Research Board, the episode received final viewing figures of 7.3 million, placing Spooks the eighth most seen programme on BBC One, and the eighteenth most seen programme overall during the week the episode was broadcast. On 28 May 2002, one day after the episode was broadcast, Gareth McLean of The Guardian just said of the previous night's episode, "so good it makes you want to be a spy."
