= Traitor's Gate (Spooks) =

- Spooks episode
- Episode no.: Series 1 Episode 4
- Directed by: Rob Bailey
- Written by: Howard Brenton
- Editing by: Colin Green
- Production code: 104
- Original air date: 4 June 2002

Guest appearances
- Anthony Head as Peter Salter; Bronwen Davies as Andrea Chambers; Jukka Hiltunen as Horst; Hugh Laurie as Jools Siviter; Jules Werner as Istvan Vogel; Patrick Kennedy as Radio Operator; Robert Finan as Jeff Catty; Christopher Jupe as Waiter; Matthew James Thomas as Demonstrator; Freddie Stuart as Drunk Man; Gurdial Sira as Mr. Patel; Gabrial Crosse as Policeman; Sarah Goodchild as Cheeky Girl 1; Joanne Baxter as Cheeky Girl 2; Richard Armitage as Armed Police Officer

Episode chronology
| ← Previous "One Last Dance" | Next → "The Rose Bed Memoirs" |

"Traitor's Gate" is the fourth episode in the first series of the British television series Spooks. It first aired on BBC One in the United Kingdom on 4 June 2002, on a Tuesday; the other first series episodes aired on Mondays. The episode was written by Howard Brenton, and directed by Rob Bailey. The episode focuses on MI5 and 6's efforts in taking down a terrorist cell before they can succeed in attacking 43rd President of the United States George W. Bush. The episode guest stars Anthony Head and Hugh Laurie, who play their respective characters Peter Salter and Jools Siviter. After its first broadcast, "Traitor's Gate" was seen by 6 million viewers, the lowest ratings in the first series.

== Plot ==
After getting shot during the Turkish consulate raid in the previous episode, Tom Quinn (Matthew Macfadyen) is on sick leave until he recovers. When Ellie (Esther Hall) notices Tom's wound, he feels compelled to tell her that he is a spy. Over the course of the episode, Ellie threatens to leave Tom unless he also explains his job to her daughter, Maisie (Heather Cave). After he does, Ellie begins to forgive him for having lied to her ever since they met.

Danny (David Oyelowo) and Zoe (Keeley Hawes) observe an anti-globalisation rally before Bush's visit, where a riot ensues led by a man in a flaming helmet, who spots the two and flees with a young woman, Andrea Chambers. When they are surrounded by riot police, the man reveals himself as Peter Salter (Anthony Head), a legendary MI5 officer who recruited Tom. They contact Tom after they weren't briefed about the situation. Harry Pearce (Peter Firth) admits that Salter is working with Harry and Jools Siviter (Hugh Laurie) at MI6 in a joint operation to take down a European anarchist terror group led by Istvan Vogel. In order to get into the cell, Salter has been sleeping with Andrea. Upon meeting him, Tom questions Salter's allegiance after learning he is in love with Andrea; Tom reluctantly allows the operation to continue, but displays his concern to Harry.

Tom's concerns are revealed to be correct, as Salter and Andrea evade Danny and Zoe. Zoe is sent to meet up with one of Tessa's (Jenny Agutter) contacts, who may have information on where Salter is. However, upon waiting, Tessa arrives; Zoe works out that Tessa is running several phantom agents and pockets their money. In order to keep Zoe quiet, Tessa bribes her £10,000. Salter meets with Vogel in Wales. There, Salter offers his plan to take down the President; they break into a University researching Geographic Topography. There, Salter breaks into the database and manipulates the flightpath of Bush's plane, and the nearby topography to cause the plane to crash. By the time all but Salter leave, Armed Police arrive and arrest Salter, who is brought to Thames House.

After reluctantly telling Tom where Vogel's group are hiding, Salter hangs himself before revealing what he did in the campus. Harry learns about Danny hacking his way into improving his credit rating, and destroys his credit cards. As punishment, Danny is to train new staff. There, he learns of Salter's intentions; the plane is diverted to Paris. In the end when Ellie asks Tom about his day, he replies; "a man, who believed in a cause, killed himself for love, totally pointless."

== Production ==
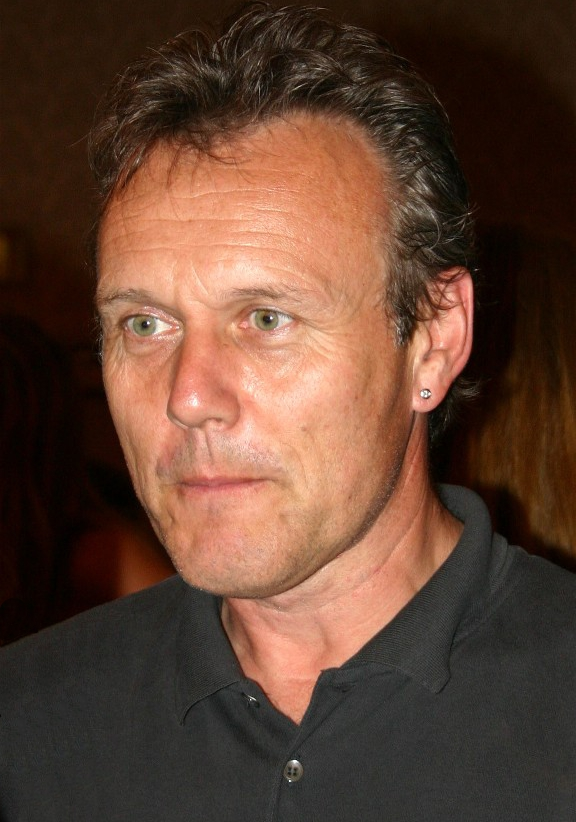
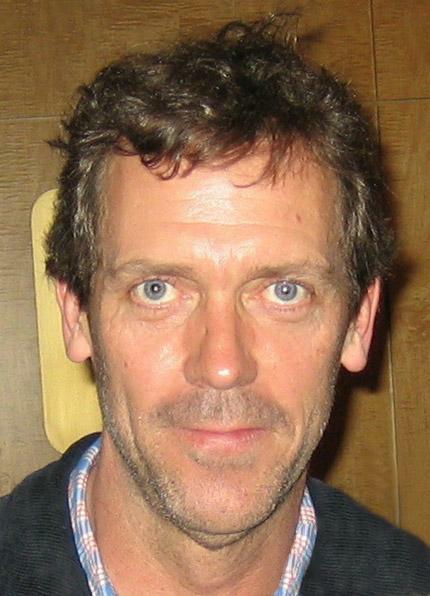
Anthony Head (left) and Hugh Laurie guest star in the episode.

"Traitor's Gate" was written by Howard Brenton. He was pleased to be chosen to write the episode, as he got to write the pivotal part of the episode when Tom reveals to Ellie that he is a spy. During the writing, Brenton was simply told in a note that "he tells her", and had to work out how. Brenton chose to adopt the same writing style based on the early episodes of Taggart; Brenton was impressed by the way the episodes seemed to have more to the plot half way through. The location where Tom and Salter meet in the middle of the episode was to be set in the Millennium Dome; this would later change to North Greenwich tube station. The scene had to be rewritten several times to reflect Tom questioning Salter's allegiance. Much of the scene was actually automated dialogue replacement. Later on, Brenton wanted to figure out how Salter would evade Danny and Zoe; when he could not figure it out, he asked a source for help, who simply suggested him to have Salter call the police about Zoe and Danny having sex in their car and there are children about. The introduction of Tessa being corrupt by running phantom agents was allegedly based on real life situations. In the series, the idea was made on the concept that MI5 officers have temptations to make money. The written scenes where Salter confesses to Tom was somewhat inspired by Tinker, Tailor, Soldier, Spy. The scene was for the two to act as friends rather than interrogator and suspect.

The character of Peter Salter was written in a way that for most of the episode, the viewing audience would guess which side Salter was really on. Anthony Head, who was well known for his role as Rupert Giles in Buffy the Vampire Slayer, was cast as Peter Salter; during the audition, producer Simon Crawford Collins noted that Head performed it so well, that he would be perfect for the role, and was hired. Hugh Laurie was cast as Jools Siviter; the character was created because of bringing in a lighter element to a generally serious series. The character was also created this way as, according to David Wolstencroft, some people in intelligence and military are generally "funny people", although they have been through "some pretty heinous things". It also became the first episode to feature MI6; the service was depicted as more "old school" compared with MI5, which the series sources confirmed.

The episode was filmed before the third episode, "One Last Dance". The first day of filming involved the scenes between Head and Brownen Davies (Andrea), which was filmed in an art house. Due to timing constraints, part of the sequence had to be cut down. A few of the scenes where Tom reveals to Ellie were filmed with a hand-held camera; this is the first time such a technique was used in Spooks. The anti-globalisation riots in the teaser of the episode were originally going to be staged, but due to budget constraints most of the riot was edited from several pieces of real-life news footage - although part of the riot, particularly involving Salter, was staged. The scene was filmed by two separate units. The building Danny and Zoe used to observe overlooked the filmed riot.

The scene where Tessa explains her treachery to Zoe was filmed at the women's public swimming baths of Hampstead Heath. The scene called for the baths to be empty; every time anyone would want a swim, the filming crew would have to halt. But because it was filmed in a cold winter's day, nobody from the public went. The setting for the terror group in the abandoned Ministry of Defence base in Wales was based on one of Brenton's friends, who lived in Mid Wales near a vast training base. The forest was filmed in an army training base in Surrey, south of London.

== Reception ==
After its original airing on BBC One, "Traitor's Gate" was seen by 5.99 million viewers in the UK, making Spooks the seventeenth most viewed broadcast on BBC One, and the thirty-second most viewed broadcast in total during the week; the episode became the lowest rated episode in the entire first series. As of April 2010, members of the user-contributed television review sites the Internet Movie Database and TV.com rated the episode at 7.9 and 9.1 (rated "Superb") out of 10 respectively.
