= Spooks series 9 =

9th series of the British television show Spooks

Spooks
- Season 9
- No. of episodes: 8

Release
- Original network: BBC One
- Original release: 20 September – 8 November 2010

Season chronology
- ← Previous; Series 8 Next → Series 10

The ninth series of the BBC espionage television series Spooks began broadcasting on 20 September 2010 before ending on 8 November 2010. The series consists of eight episodes.

== Cast ==
=== Main ===
- Richard Armitage as Lucas North
- Sophia Myles as Beth Bailey
- Max Brown as Dimitri Levendis
- Shazad Latif as Tariq Masood
- Nicola Walker as Ruth Evershed
- Peter Firth as Harry Pearce

=== Guests ===
- Iain Glen as Vaughn Edwards
- Simon Russell Beale as William Towers
- Laila Rouass as Maya Lahan
- Colin Salmon as Alton Beecher
- Hugh Simon as Malcolm Wynn-Jones
- Hi Ching as Yimou
- Robert Glenister as Nicholas Blake

== Episodes ==
No. overall	No. in series	Title	Directed by	Written by	Original release date	UK viewers (millions)
73	1	"Episode 1"	Paul Whittington	Jonathan Brackley & Sam Vincent	20 September 2010	6.74
At Ros's funeral, Harry proposes to Ruth, who turns him down. She produces evidence that former Home Secretary Blake worked with Nightingale and ordered the bombing that killed Ros (Blake's resignation had been a distraction). Harry visits Blake and poisons him making it appear he has had a heart attack. One month later, Lucas boards a freighter in Tangier to assassinate Somali terrorist Hussein Abib. Harry visits the new Home Secretary, William Towers, and submits a letter of resignation. Towers will not immediately accept it. Before Lucas can complete his mission, the ship is hijacked by soldiers working for Abib. Dimitri Levendes, an MI-5 agent posing as captain, discovers Abib has loaded the ship with explosives, with the apparent intent of sailing into Plymouth. With the help of security contractor Beth Bailey, who has been masquerading as a passenger, Lucas and Beth escape the ship. Dimitri kills Abib. Beth tells Harry that she recognised a South American among the Somali terrorists; because he worked with submersibles to smuggle drugs, it is likely that submersibles were on board, confirmed when Dimitri reports that he heard two boats go overboard while he was held in a container. When he checked for the explosives, they were gone. MI-5 deduces that the submersibles, laden with explosives, are heading up the Thames toward the Houses of Parliament. Discovering that "Talwar", Abib's contact, is in the UK, Lucas tries to force her to abort the mission by threatening to kill her mother. When this fails, Harry approves the launch of an EMP bomb underneath the Houses, which disables the subs’ electrical systems. Harry calls the Home Secretary, and instructs him to tear up the letter of resignation. Beth applies successfully to join the MI-5 team, while Lucas is paid an unexpected visit by Vaughn Edwards from Lucas's past, who is now partially disabled by a stroke; Vaughn leaves Lucas with a briefcase.
74	2	"Episode 2"	Michael Caton-Jones	David Farr	27 September 2010	6.27
Beth is tasked with protecting an oil baron, Robert Westhouse, after receiving intelligence that he may be assassinated by Nigerian agents. In a London hotel, potential oil industry contacts, including an undercover Beth, are subject to a machine gun attack in the hotel lift. Beth and another contact, Jacob Chapman, drop to the floor just before the attackers open fire. Beth and Chapman survive unharmed. Lucas, particularly about Beth's role. Dimitri Levendis and Lucas penetrate Westhouse's mansion, and plant a bug. It becomes clear that the Nigerians want Westhouse dead because he plans to launch a chemical weapon attack against Lagos and precipitate a coup to monopolise the country's oil reserves. Beth appears to work with Chapman, who turns out to be the hired assassin. Beth explains her subterfuge as "the way we used to work", and avoids any damage. Meanwhile, Harry takes Westhouse on, face-to-face, and leaves him with a no-win situation. Leaving, Nigerian agents mistake Harry for Westhouse, and attempt to assassinate him. Beth pushes Harry out of the line of fire, saving him. Lucas gives Beth another chance after he is promoted to Section D chief. Meanwhile, he looks into the briefcase he has been given by Vaughn and finds Maya Lahan, his first love. However, she does not want to be involved with him after he left her 15 years earlier.
75	3	"Episode 3"	Michael Caton-Jones	Richard McBrien	4 October 2010	6.04
After a discussion with Home Secretary Townes, it becomes clear to Harry that one of the last remaining specimens of a deadly biological agent, Paroxocybin, is stored in Azakstan; it is likely to fall into the hands of a rogue nationalist. A joint MI5-FSB operation succeeds in seizing the agent, and rendering it harmless. However, Azis Aibek, an Azakstan terrorist, learns the whereabouts of the other specimen, in London; its exact whereabouts are known to Prof Kirby, a chemistry professor. The Home Secretary forces Section D to take FSB officer Viktor Barenshik onto the Grid to help track down Aibek. While following Aibek across London, it is revealed that one of the original scientists who worked on the agent kept a sample. Aibek discovers that Kirby's daughter Meg knows where the agent is, and subjects her to water torture. When Lucas, Beth, Dimitri, and Viktor arrive, Aibek flees. But Viktor continues the torture, and extracts the location from Meg, killing her to prevent her from talking. Viktor wants to take the agent to the Russians to justify their invasion of Azakstan. With his daughter dead, Harry gets Kirby to reveal the location of the Paroxocybin to MI5. Aibek is captured but the capture is kept from Viktor. Section D gives Aibek a deal to trick Viktor, which involves faking theft of the Paroxocybin. Viktor kills Aibek; Beth kills Viktor, and Tariq forges a video that makes it seem as if it was Aibek who killed Viktor and got away. With the Russians thinking that Azakstan nationalists have the Paroxocybin, they withdraw from Azakstan. Vaughn approaches Lucas again, asking him for an MI5 file named "Albany".
76	4	"Episode 4"	Paul Whittington	Jonathan Brackley & Sam Vincent	11 October 2010	6.37
Chinese agents arrive in the UK to kidnap and assassinate Dr Jiang, a scientist developing new desalination technology. Beth turns Kai, a Chinese diplomat, into an asset. Lucas and Dimitri break into the embassy to steal information regarding the agents. Ruth goes undercover in the company's building to access their computers. Kai informs MI-5 of a bomb in the same building. MI-5 jams radio to prevent remote detonation. Ruth tries to get Jiang out of the building, but she is in the custody of CIA agents. They are informed of a CIA safe house as they drive there with Jiang, Ruth, and Lucas. The CIA agents were set up; the Chinese, knowing that MI-5 would prevent remote detonation, tricked the CIA with a fake broadcast, and kidnap Jiang. In response, MI-5 lets the Chinese intercept false intel through Kai indicating that the Home Secretary will authorise a breach of the embassy to rescue Jiang. The Chinese take the bait, and move Jiang, and Kai who is under arrest, to the airport. The Section D team intercepts and seizes them both. The UK head of Chinese intelligence informs Harry that if they do not hand Jiang back, they will detonate a bomb in London. Dimitri finds the bomb and disarms it with Tariq's help. Jiang is transferred to the CIA. Kai, who can have freedom in London, misses his homeland, and turns himself in to the Chinese embassy. Lucas obtains the Albany file by logging into the network using the ID of Stephen Owen, another agent. He then transfers money into Owen's bank account, and delivers the file to Vaughn. He believes this will allow him to restart his relationship with Maya. Owen is identified and arrested. The Chinese agents reveal that their true mission is to track and kill Lucas.
77	5	"Episode 5"	Julian Holmes	Jonathan Brackley & Sam Vincent & Oliver Brown	18 October 2010	6.35
While Beth and Dimitri go undercover during the US President's visit to chair secret peace talks between Israel and Palestine, a plot to assassinate him is uncovered. Believing it is the work of Lebanese militant Muatt Hutri, Lucas tracks him. Hutri slips out of Lucas's grasp, and traps Lucas but does not kill him. Lucas visits Maya, telling her that now they can be together. Hutri gives himself up to MI-5; he says that he is in London to stop the assassination, and that the actual assassin is Baltasar Jad, a Syrian. Jad captures Beth, and secures her in his workshop. He cuts himself in the thigh, and goes to the emergency entrance of a hospital near the hotel. He retrieves a gun in the basement, and goes to the roof. Beth escapes, and reports Jad's wound. From the roof, Jad is attempting to take a shot from a mile and a half away, through the windows of a building between him and the hotel. The President is rerouted to the back of the hotel, and a wild shot wounds Raed Elwan of the Palestinian delegation. Lucas gets to the roof, and kills Jad. They realise that the sniper is a diversion; the actual assassin is Israeli Anna Cohen, who plans to blow herself up with the president as revenge for her father's deserting her when she was captured by Palestinians. Her father, Levi Cohen and Dimitri are able to talk her out of the plan. In the end, Lucas visits Maya's home but her boyfriend is there. The boyfriend turns out to be Vaughn, looking smarter than before. Lucas realises Vaughn has no intention of leaving him alone.
78	6	"Episode 6"	Julian Holmes	Jonathan Brackley & Sam Vincent	25 October 2010	6.36
After an American drone is hacked by enemies in Afghanistan, the head of CIA London, Alton Beecher, pressures the Grid into installing the new advanced "Cybershell" system. Lucas, who is pressed by Vaughn to find the Albany file, is tasked with transporting CIA cyber-expert Danielle Ortiz, who has the codes for Cybershell. However, Tariq discovers the Grid is bugged by a coalition of Russian and Chinese agents, who plan on sabotaging Cybershell. During a faked power shortage, Harry lets the team know. Meanwhile, Vaughn orders Lucas to bring the file immediately. Lucas pretends he is being followed, and drives to a garage where he and Danielle switch to an untraceable car and lose her CIA bodyguards. Lucas then detours to Malcolm's home to get the Albany file. Danielle, who is suspicious, walks to a window and overhears part of the conversation. Malcolm digs up a box containing the file. Lucas receives a call from Harry about a new rendezvous point, but it is from the hackers who are fabricating Harry's voice. After the hackers lock down the Grid, Harry has no way to contact Lucas; the hackers, using Harry's voice again, order Lucas to assassinate Danielle, though he eventually realises it is being faked. With Danielle locked in the boot, they are ambushed; Lucas kills the attackers, but Danielle is shot in the neck. When Danielle mentions that she will not disclose anything about Albany, revealing that she knows about it, Lucas fakes a 999 call, but lets her bleed out and die. At the Grid, the team tries to find a way to escape; Dimitri uses bomb components to blow open a door to the street. Using the information Tariq has acquired, they determine the hackers' location. A fabricated Harry talks to the hackers over the Internet, playing for time while Dimitri and armed police storm the building and apprehend them. Ruth reveals to Harry that she has been bugging Lucas and believes he cannot be trusted because of inconsistencies in his reports. Meanwhile, Vaughn reprimands Lucas for giving him a fake file. Lucas returns to Malcolm's home to get the real one, only to find the house cleaned out.
79	7	"Episode 7"	Edward Hall	Anthony Neilson	1 November 2010	6.10
Ruth looks into a suspected dead drop witnessed by council employee Keith Deery; colleagues are sceptical that Deery has real evidence. Having tracked Lucas's keyboard, Ruth tells Harry that she suspects Lucas of treachery. Harry says she is being "overzealous". Dimitri joins the police as they pick up a Mafia boss who is giving himself up and makes a connection to Deery's evidence. Ruth goes to Deery's council flat to investigate. Meanwhile, two Chinese operatives who are in Vaughn's apartment tell him that if he does not deliver the Albany file, they will rape and kill Maya. Vaughn kidnaps Maya to force Lucas to get the file. Harry, having revisited the 1995 bombing of the British Embassy in Dakar, realises that Lucas was involved. He orders Beth to follow Lucas. Vaughn holds Maya in a basement. Lucas tracks Vaughn; Vaughn tells Lucas not to show his gun but insists on obtaining the file. Lucas stabs Vaughn in the thigh, and forces Vaughn to reveal Maya's whereabouts. But Beth pulls a gun on Lucas, and Vaughn escapes. Meanwhile, at Deery's flat, a French assassin targeting the Mafia boss ties Ruth to a chair. Ruth uses a hot iron to break free. She frees Deery; together they kill the assassin. When Lucas is apprehended, he reveals to Harry that he is actually John Bateman, who unknowingly sent the bomb Vaughn had given him to the Dakar Embassy, killing 17 people. Lucas also recounts that Vaughn later killed the real Lucas North; Bateman had taken his identity. He convinces Harry to release him and rescue Maya. Lucas frees Maya. After their ordeal, Ruth and Deery are in hospital. Deery is on suicide watch. When Harry visits, Ruth tells him she is fine and is ready to return to work. When they are both back at Thames House, Malcolm comes to tell Harry about Lucas's visit.
80	8	"Episode 8"	Edward Hall	Jonathan Brackley & Sam Vincent	8 November 2010	6.40
Harry leads a manhunt for Lucas, and hires former officer Alec White to help. With Vaughn dead, Lucas makes a deal with Chinese agents for Albany. Lucas arranges to meet the MI-5 team, but gets a man in a hooded sweatshirt to run, tricking the agents into thinking it is him and mistakenly shooting him. Meanwhile, Lucas kidnaps Ruth. He threatens to kill her using an anaesthetic drip unless Harry gives him Albany, which is revealed to be a blueprint for a genetic weapon that can target a specific ethnic group. Harry gives in. The team finds Maya; Alec tells her about Lucas's past actions, and Maya turns against Lucas. Alec gets Maya to wear a tracker, and as Lucas gets away she insists he tell Harry where Ruth is. The two escape from Beth and Dimitri, but Maya is mortally wounded. After handing Albany to the Chinese, Lucas threatens to destroy London Bridge station unless he can meet Harry alone. Ruth tells Harry her life was not worth trading a state secret that could lead to so much destruction. Although the bomb is revealed to be a fake, Harry sees Lucas, knowing Lucas intends to kill him. On the roof of a tower, Harry reveals to Lucas that Albany never worked but that this was kept from the outside world. Lucas realises that he has nothing to live for, points a gun at Harry and tells Harry to turn around. Harry encourages Lucas to shoot him quickly. When no shot is fired, and hearing a car alarm below, Harry looks down, and sees that 'Lucas' has jumped to his death, which upsets his colleagues. Home Secretary Towers reveals to Harry that, because he gave away a state secret, there will now be a full inquiry into his career.

== Production ==
The series introduces Jonathan Brackley and Sam Vincent as the new head writers, having written five of the eight episodes together. Both writers got into the series after sending a script of an original thriller to Kudos Film and Television. The production company responded by offering them a position to write for Spooks. Because both were fans of the series since the beginning, they accepted and felt it was "a bit of a dream job." Both writers were mostly influenced by the works of Joss Whedon to write their scripts. Because they wrote their scripts together, they tried various ways to write them, but found the most productive method was for one to write five pages, then have the other edit it and write the next five pages, as it would keep both voices consistent.

== Home video release ==
The ninth series was released on DVD in the United Kingdom on 28 February 2011. The box set consists of all eight episodes from the series. Extras include two featurettes entitled The Cost of Being a Spy and The Downfall of Lucas North, as well as episode audio commentaries by Jonathan Brackley, Anthony Neilson, Sam Vincent, Nicola Walker, and Andrew Woodhead.
