= Maya Lahan =

Fictional character from television series Spooks

- Spooks character
- Laila Rouass as Maya Lahan
- First appearance: "Series 9, Episode 2"
- Last appearance: "Series 9, Episode 8"
- Portrayed by: Laila Rouass

In-universe information
- Occupation: Doctor
- Significant other: Lucas North
- Nationality: British

Doctor Maya Lahan is a fictional character from the British espionage television series Spooks, which follows the exploits of Section D, a counter-terrorism division in MI5. She is portrayed by British actress Laila Rouass. Maya is introduced in the ninth series of the programme as the first love and former girlfriend of John Bateman (who changed his name to Lucas North) fifteen years before the events of the series.

Rouass' involvement in the series was first announced in March 2010, with her character name revealed later in May. Because Maya was only a background character, Rouass's role was limited, did not perform any stunts and had time to perform other projects. The actress liked working with Richard Armitage, who played Lucas, as she knew him for some years prior to working on Spooks. The character was met with generally mixed reviews from critics.

== Role in Spooks ==
=== Character arc ===
Maya Lahan was born in York on 20 September 1975. She became the girlfriend of John Bateman (Richard Armitage) whilst attending Leeds University. Maya was once aspired to open her own Tapas bar. When John became stuck in Dakar, he worked with Vaughn Edwards (Iain Glen) as a courier in order to get back home, but Maya remained unaware of his activities. Vaughn remembered that during their time, John would talk to him about Maya for hours at a time. However, after he was involved in the bombing of a British Embassy in 1995, John was forced to leave Maya and murder friend Lucas North, and since started masquerading as him. In the belief that John died, Maya got on with her life, becoming a doctor and enters a relationship with Vaughn (whom she knows as Michael).

Fifteen years later, in the first episode of the ninth series, Vaughn visits Lucas and leaves him with several mementos of his former life, including pictures of him and Maya. Lucas finds the hospital where she works to meet her. However, Maya coldly rejects him, stating she moved on with somebody else, and that she no longer needs him. By the end of the third episode however, Lucas invites her to his home and the two have sex on a kitchen table, thus restarting their relationship. However, over the course of the series, Vaughn has been manipulating Lucas, by giving him Maya back into his life, in order to get his hands on an MI5 file named "Albany", which contain blueprints for a genetic weapon. To further force Lucas' hand in getting the file, Vaughn abducts Maya, though he was possibly doing this in order to protect her from Chinese agents who wish to acquire Albany, and threatening to rape then behead Maya should Vaughn fail to deliver. Later, Lucas finds Maya after mortally wounding Vaughn. Having confessed his past crimes to his MI5 superior, Harry Pearce (Peter Firth), Lucas intends to flee the country with Maya, and agrees to give the Chinese Albany in exchange for money, and new identities for the couple. However, Maya is approached by hired specialist, Alec White (Vincent Regan), who tells her of Lucas's past crimes. By doing so, Maya turns against Lucas, and attempts to get him to surrender. However, when Beth Bailey (Sophia Myles) and Dimitri Levendis (Max Brown) arrive, Lucas takes Maya to his car and evades them. When Beth and Demitri open fire, a bullet hits Maya in the torso, and she dies. Because a GPS tracker was placed on Maya, Lucas leaves her body behind.

=== Characteristics and relationships ===
They [Maya and Lucas] make decisions and they want to be together forever. Because of that there's trouble, but it's not because of her. It's just the circumstances that they're in and the fact that they have a strong desire to be with each other.

— Laila Rouass

Maya is depicted as the first love of Lucas North. Laila Rouass stated "she's the love of his life and he's the love of hers." When he is forced to disappear, it "completely rocks her world." Armitage meanwhile believed that Maya had an effect with every relationship Lucas had since, and having failed them all, Lucas hangs onto thinking about Maya. When Lucas returns, Maya's life is turns "upside down," and she is angry at him because she feels betrayed by him. Armitage stated that Lucas was "just compelled to see her" after looking at photographs of them both together, and really shapes his future. Both characters go on "quite an interesting journey" because Maya moved on with her life without Lucas, and he has to fight to get her to listen to him. However, when they start to restart their relationship, Vaughn gets in the way and "throws water over it." Rouass believes that Lucas "definitely" trusts Maya without question, and that their relationship is "dynamic and explosive" and makes them "question certain things." Neither of them can control their relationship, which scares Maya. Iain Glen believed that Maya is also Lucas' central weakness, and his love for her becomes instrumental to his downfall.

== Conceptual history ==
I'd watched the first couple of series, dipped in and out of it, but I think everyone's a fan of Spooks even if they don't watch it all the time. Every time I tell someone that I'm doing Spooks, they're like, 'Wow!' That's a guaranteed reaction. It's such a high-end show, it's so sexy and slick and smooth. It's got a great cast as well, so I'm chuffed to be on it.

— Laila Rouass

In March 2010, it was announced that Laila Rouass has joined the cast of the ninth series of Spooks, along with Max Brown and Sophia Myles, however at the time Sarah Brandist from the BBC refused to reveal details of the character, including the name, citing "we don't want to give too much away as intrigue and betrayal are at the heart of the storylines." Later in May of the same year, co-star Richard Armitage announced Rouass would play a character named Maya, described as "an old flame of Lucas's, possibly his first love."

Rouass was acquainted with the series, having viewed the first two series and "dipped in and out of it." She also stated that Maya is only a background character throughout the series, meaning her role is limited, and does not play a spy or becoming "part of this mafia or that mafia." Due to her limited appearance, the actress was available to perform other projects, including The Sarah Jane Adventures and Conan the Barbarian, as well as spending the free time with her daughter. Rouass does not participate in any stunt work, but does appear in "a lot of passionate scenes." Having gotten used to filming sex scenes in Footballers' Wives, Rouass noticed that while humour was involved in Footballers' Wives, Spooks was more passionate and very choreographed. In an interview with the Daily Mirror, Rouass recalled one of the scenes; "there's one scene where we get together in the kitchen and the director was like, 'Come on, let's be honest, you haven't seen each other for years, you're not going to get all romantic, you're going to shag her on the table.'"

Rouass liked working with Armitage during her duration on the series, having met him in Los Angeles a few years prior, as well as Iain Glen, who plays Vaughn Edwards, although she was worried that should "Maya let anything happen to [Lucas] I'll be one of the most hated women in the country." She also admitted she had "no idea" if her character would be killed off, but said in an interview with Digital Spy, "at the end of the day, you just know what the show's about. You know there's a chance that you could go, but you have to embrace that."

== Reception ==
The character was met by generally mixed reactions from critics. Nick Bryan of Dork Adore was not convinced of the Lucas and Maya storyline, stating "I keep forgetting she exists whenever she's off-screen. Vicky Frost of The Guardian had mixed reactions towards the character, writing "let's hope that Maya turns out to be more than just a device for us to find out about Lucas' past," but adds that she is not "holding my breath." For the finale, Frost criticised the writing behind the line where Maya admits she always believed Lucas' actions when she was told "seemed almost giddily optimistic."
