= Kylie Morris =

Australian journalist

Kylie Morris is an Australian journalist who was the Washington, D.C. correspondent for the UK's Channel 4 News until August 2019. She moved to the United Kingdom in 1998 after working with the Australian Broadcasting Corporation. She began working for the BBC in 2000 as a foreign correspondent. During her time there she covered the second intifada in Gaza, and post-war Afghanistan. She was based in Thailand at the time of the Indian Ocean tsunami and has reported from wartime Iraq. Morris interviewed disgraced British glam rock singer Gary Glitter inside his Vietnamese prison in 2006, Morris joined Channel 4 News as its Asia correspondent.

Morris quit Channel 4 News in August 2019 and returned to Newcastle, New South Wales with her family. She was replaced in her position by Siobhan Kennedy. From 2020 to 2023, Morris reported for ABC News from Newcastle before moving to work as a producer and occasional fill-in host on ABC RN in 2024.

Morris is married to British film director Bharat Nalluri.
