= Spooks: The Greater Good =

2015 British film directed by Bharat Nalluri

- Film poster
- Directed by: Bharat Nalluri
- Written by: Jonathan Brackley; Sam Vincent
- Produced by: Jane Featherstone
- Starring: Peter Firth; Kit Harington; Jennifer Ehle; Elyes Gabel; Lara Pulver; Tim McInnerny; Eleanor Matsuura; David Harewood; Elliot Levey; Tuppence Middleton; Michael Wildman; Hugh Simon; Geoffrey Streatfeild
- Cinematography: Hubert Taczanowski
- Edited by: Jamie Pearson
- Music by: Dominic Lewis
- Production companies: Pinewood Pictures; Isle of Man Film; Kudos Film and Television; Shine Pictures; Altitude Film Entertainment; BBC Films; Creative England
- Distributed by: 20th Century Fox (United Kingdom); Altitude Film Sales (Worldwide)
- Release date: 8 May 2015
- Running time: 104 minutes
- Country: United Kingdom
- Language: English
- Budget: $1.1 million
- Box office: $5.3 million

Spooks: The Greater Good (known as MI-5 in some countries) is a 2015 British spy film, continuing from the 2002–2011 British television spy series Spooks. Jonathan Brackley and Sam Vincent wrote the script, with Bharat Nalluri directing. Peter Firth reprises his role as Harry Pearce, who appeared in all ten series of the programme. Also returning from the TV series are Tim McInnerny as Oliver Mace, Lara Pulver as Erin Watts, Hugh Simon as Malcolm Wynn-Jones, and Geoffrey Streatfeild as Calum Reed. Kit Harington and Jennifer Ehle star as new characters in leading roles.

The film was released on 8 May 2015. Upon its release, it received generally mixed reviews from critics.

== Plot ==
Harry Pearce is head of the counter-terrorism department (Section D) at MI5. Harry's team is transporting terrorist Adem Qasim through London when the convoy is attacked, allowing Qasim to escape and a CIA operative to be killed. Realising that the CIA will demand a scapegoat and that he is soon to be fired, Harry fakes suicide by jumping off Lambeth Bridge into the Thames. He then tracks down Qasim and offers him a deal: he will get Qasim "what he wants" if he gives him the MI5 contact who helped him escape.

Will Holloway is picked up in Moscow by MI5 operative Hannah Santo and taken to London to meet MI5 Director General Oliver Mace, JIC Chairman Francis Warrender, MI5 Head of Counter-Intelligence Emerson and MI5 Deputy Director General Geraldine Maltby. Will's father had worked closely with Harry until he was killed in action. Will worked with Harry for several years, until Harry decommissioned him citing poor performance. The intelligence officials were not fooled by Harry's suicide and want Will to bring him in.

Harry contacts Will and organises a meeting. Harry reveals his suspicions about an MI5 traitor, asking for Will's help. Will refuses to trust Harry, but starts investigating the theory without notifying MI5. He meets June, a section D officer involved in the botched prisoner transport, and they investigate the flat of operation lead Robert Vass. They find incriminating evidence, but Vass arrives home, and June kills him in a fight.

British intelligence chiefs are attending a concert with NATO officials where a suicide bomber kills Warrender and five other officials. Qasim takes credit, citing it as a targeted attack on the elite rather than the public, but he is dissatisfied with the government response so starts to plan an attack on Oxford Circus that will kill hundreds of civilians.

Qasim wants, in exchange for the traitor, his wife, whom MI5 traded to the Russian FSB. Harry meets the FSB in Berlin, but Will and June intervene and attempt to capture Harry. Harry realises June is working against them and convinces Will she intends to kill them. They capture June, who has been unknowingly following the traitor's orders. They leave her in Berlin, and meet the FSB team. They learn that Qasim's wife died, so they arrange to meet Qasim in London, claiming she is alive.

Harry and Will recruit Hannah to their cause, and she pretends to be Qasim's wife. However, when the operation is botched, Harry meets Qasim alone, confirms that his wife is dead, and makes a new deal. Fearing what deal Harry might have made, Will demands Hannah call in SCO19, who arrest Harry and Will and take them to MI5 headquarters.

Qasim has given Harry the location of his terrorist cell, allowing MI5 to neutralise the pending attack and apprehend most of Qasim's men. While Mace, Emerson and Maltby are interrogating Harry, Qasim bursts into the room with armed men, killing several personnel including Calum Reed. To their horror, Harry had given Qasim the knowledge necessary to infiltrate headquarters. Mace offers his life if Qasim spares the others, but when Emerson proclaims credit for sabotaging the transport, Qasim kills him instead. Will works with June to kill Qasim and his thugs.

Now aware that Harry was right about the traitor, Mace lets him escape. Will catches up to Harry and demands an explanation; Harry explains it was the only way to stop the attack and kill the traitor, and that the deaths of some MI5 agents were preferable to the deaths of hundreds of civilians.

A week later, Harry meets Maltby at a seaside home. Harry tells her that he knows she was the one who sabotaged the prisoner transport, and that Emerson claimed sole credit only to protect her. When Maltby refuses to accept any consequences, Harry reveals that he poisoned her lunch and she has only two hours left to live.

Harry meets Will and explains that the real reason he decommissioned him was not because he was not good enough, but to protect him out of respect for his father. Harry then leaves.

== Cast ==
- Peter Firth as Harry Pearce
- Kit Harington as Will Holloway, a former MI5 officer with an estranged relationship with Pearce
- Jennifer Ehle as Geraldine Maltby, the Deputy Director-General of MI5
- Elyes Gabel as Adem Qasim, a charismatic terrorist leader
- Lara Pulver as Erin Watts, a former MI5 Section Chief
- Tim McInnerny as Sir Oliver Mace, the Director General of MI5
- Hugh Simon as Malcolm Wynn-Jones, a retired MI5 analyst
- Eleanor Matsuura as Hannah Santo, an MI5 officer
- David Harewood as Francis Warrender, chairman of the Joint Intelligence Committee
- Tuppence Middleton as June Keaton, an MI5 officer
- Geoffrey Streatfield as Calum Reed, an MI5 analyst
- Elliot Levey as Emerson, the Head of MI5 Counter Intelligence
- Michael Wildman as Robert Vass, an MI5 officer
- Cosmo Jarvis as Dani Tasuev

== Production ==
Plans of the film were first revealed to be 'in the works' by Firth in March 2013, with a script in development. Firth stated that although "they should make it", he also thought it would cost a lot, "and there's not a lot of money to go round at the moment". The film was officially announced on 1 November 2013. Jonathan Brackley and Sam Vincent, who took over as head writers for the last two years of the Spooks television series, wrote the script. It would be directed by Bharat Nalluri, who previously directed the first episodes of the programme. Jane Featherstone and Stephen Garrett of Kudos, and Ollie Madden of Shine Group would produce the film.

Principal photography commenced in March 2014 at locations including Berlin, Moscow, Isle of Man and London as well as Pinewood Studios. A trailer for the film was released on 27 March 2015.

== Reception ==
The film received mixed reviews. On Rotten Tomatoes it has an approval rating of 63% based on 41 reviews, with an average rating of 5.5/10. The website's critical consensus states: "MI-5 (Spooks: The Greater Good) is a stylish, albeit rather perfunctory, adaptation of a spy thriller perhaps best left on the small screen." On Metacritic, the film holds a score of 47 out of 100, based on 13 critics, signifying "mixed or average reviews".
