= Thou Shalt Not Kill (Spooks) =

- Spooks episode
- Episode no.: Series 1 Episode 1
- Directed by: Bharat Nalluri
- Written by: David Wolstencroft
- Original air date: 13 May 2002
- Running time: 59 minutes

Guest appearances
- Lisa Faulkner as Helen Flynn; Lisa Eichhorn as Mary Kane; Megan Dodds as Christine Dale; Ken Bones as Keith Burns; Adam Kotz as Mike Lynott; Karen Westwood as Karen Lynott; Alexandra Robinson as Sarah Lynott; Anni Rademacher as Claire Lynott; Rachel Power as Rachel; Paul Haigh as Rob; Derek Riddell as Steven; Nick Lamont as John; Paul Broughton as Paul; Matt Delamere as Ringo; Kelly Rolfe as "Osprey"; Louisde Ludgate as Female PR; Oliver Fox as Clive; Tara Moran as Guest 1; Stephen Hudson as Hack; Royce Mills as Toby McInnes; George Eggay as Male Nurse; Kay Noone as Elderly Woman; William Buckhurst as Exposal Expert; Jon Huyton as "Foxtrot"

Episode chronology
← Previous —	Next → "Looking After Our Own"
- Spooks (series 1)

"Thou Shalt Not Kill" is the premiere episode of the British television series Spooks. It first aired on BBC One in the United Kingdom on 13 May 2002. The episode was written by series creator David Wolstencroft and directed by Bharat Nalluri. "Thou Shalt Not Kill" focuses on MI5's activities in stopping an anti-abortion group who have smuggled 20 explosive devices to be used against family planning doctors. The episode title is a reference to the sixth Commandment.

The pilot went through 30 rewrites and four separate story changes before the BBC were satisfied with the plot. It would be rewritten again following the September 11 attacks, with the purpose of acknowledging the series premise as battling terrorism. Filming took place mostly in London, England using a long lens camera. The idea of using split screen, regularly used by the series, came from Nalluri after filming wrapped up for the episode, and was not inspired by the American television series 24.

Following its broadcast, the pilot was seen by over nine million viewers, easily winning its time slot, having nearly doubled viewership from ITV1 at the same time; the ratings went beyond the producers' expectations. However, critics gave varied responses towards the episode.

== Plot ==
When a car bomb detonates in the Liverpool suburb of Allerton, killing family planning doctor Karen Lynott (Karen Westwood) and severely injuring her young daughter Sarah, Section D of MI5 is on the case. Danny Hunter (David Oyelowo) learns from one of his assets, "Osprey" (Kelly Rolfe), that the group responsible have smuggled 20 bombs into the country from Ireland. After following her, the team learn that the terrorist responsible for smuggling the bombs and killing Lynott is Mary Kane (Lisa Eichhorn), an American anti-abortion extremist; she smuggled herself into the country under an assumed name and has been setting up cells across the UK. Section D also learn that Kane may be setting up the attacks in tribute to her husband, who is on death row in Florida following a series of attacks on abortion clinics. Upon tracking the movements of one cell, the Central Intelligence Agency pressure MI5 to extradite Kane back to the United States; such an action will seriously hinder their efforts to find the cells and a put a stop to them. By the time Harry Pearce (Peter Firth) signs the extradition forms, Kane has evaded MI5.

In the meantime, Zoe Reynolds (Keeley Hawes) goes undercover to pose as a sympathizer to the cell. She lures a member, Rachel (Rachel Power) to the same hospital Sarah Lynott is being treated; Sarah later dies from the extent of her injuries. Senior case officer and team leader Tom Quinn (Matthew Macfadyen) attempts to persuade her to stop Kane, believing she has little regard for any life. Rachel leaves in haste, but unbeknownst to her, MI5 bug her mobile phone and record a phone conversation she makes to the cell regarding their next target, Diane Sullivan, a doctor living in London. Tom's team are able to take Sullivan to safety whilst Zoe poses as the target. The team see Kane deliver a bomb to Zoe's car, and prepares to detonate it via mobile phone. To counter the attack, a Bomb Squad jams the signal long enough for Tom to arrest her. During the interrogation, Tom promises to send her to a state in the US where the death penalty does not apply in exchange for the locations of every cell she runs in the UK. After she cooperates, Tom goes back on the deal and delivers Kane to CIA liaison Christine Dale (Megan Dodds), who returns her to Florida to be executed.

Over the course of the episode, Tom enters a relationship with civilian Ellie Simm (Esther Hall) following an unrelated operation before the events of the episode, going by the pseudonym of civil servant in IT "Matthew Archer".

== Production ==
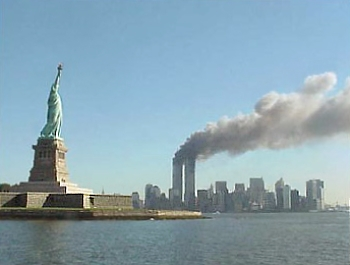
The script was partly rewritten to acknowledge the September 11 attacks, which took place after the scripting was passed; it was made in order to acknowledge the series' genre of battling terrorism.

The script for the episode went through 30 drafts, and four separate stories before the BBC were satisfied and ordered the series. Writing the pilot was completed before the September 11 terrorist attacks; after the attacks took place, the producers decided to add mention of the events into the episode in order to acknowledge the fact that the series is about fighting terrorism.

Writer David Wolstencroft decided that Tom Quinn would use IT as his cover story for Ellie Simm, because IT has, according to Wolstencroft, "something that has an enormous amount of thought and technical fact behind it that nobody would really understand," and according to series producer Jane Featherstone, has people reluctant to be asking questions about. A scene where a cat escaped during Zoe's operation to bug Kane's cottage, and the ensuing search in the rain mirrored an experience during Wolstencroft's early career. It was also intended that the episode established that although spies plan heavily before operations, things can go wrong. Among the main cast, Peter Firth was attracted to appearing on Spooks after hearing of Howard Brenton's involvement in the series. The cast were advised by ex-MI5 officers in order to help give insight into how the characters operate in the spy world and how their personal lives would be affected by it. The character Maisie Simm (Heather Cave), Ellie's daughter, was created because Featherstone believed that "children are the best spies of all"; Maisie is often seen "spying" on Tom throughout the episode and first series. Megan Dodds guest starred as Christine Dale; the producers were sufficiently impressed with her performance that she would later return as Dale in the second series.

Principal photography took place in November and December 2001. The majority of filming was done with a long lens, which proved difficult as many filming location were short on space. 40 to 50 cuts were made in the first 10 minutes of the episode to quickly introduce the main characters. Filming took part almost entirely in London; some London locations doubled as Liverpool locations, including the hospital, which was filmed in Covent Garden. The hospital scenes were first in the episode to be shot. The scenes set in a cottage in The Wirral were filmed in Surrey; the cottage was dubbed the "cottage from hell" according to director Bharat Nalluri because of its small size. The Freemasons' Hall in London served as the filming location for Thames House, the headquarters for MI5. The Hall was chosen as the producers felt that both buildings were similar in architecture. The Grid set was filmed in a Kensington medical school. Borough Market was located to film the scenes where Kane is arrested; filming proved to be difficult as they had to reset the scene several times.

The idea for split screening came to Nalluri after visiting a pub one night after filming wrapped up. In the audio commentary for the episode, Nalluri stated he was not inspired by the American series 24, which also uses split screen, as he was not yet aware of the show. The news report covering Mary and Paul Kane's past activities were snippets of real-life news from the United States, which were edited together. The music was composed by Jennie Muskett, who spent just two to three hours putting several pieces of background music together. One part of the episode centred on Zoe posing as target Diane Sullivan. Some publicity shots of Keeley Hawes in the series were shots of her with long brunette hair, though in fact she has short blonde hair.

== Broadcast and reception ==
The pilot was first broadcast on Monday 13 May 2002, during the 9 to 10 pm time slot. The Spooks producers were hoping the ratings for the pilot would achieve at least six million viewers, with a 30 per cent audience share; at the time this would be considered acceptable ratings by the BBC, as it would allow them to further consider Spooks' future. The episode ended up with an overnight rating of 9.2 million viewers, with a 41 per cent audience share, easily winning its time slot, and nearly doubling the numbers of ITV1's Helen West, which was viewed by 4.8 million with 22 per cent share in the same slot. The final numbers posted on the Broadcasters' Audience Research Board website was up slightly to 9.6 million viewers, making the Spooks pilot the seventh most viewed BBC One broadcast, and the tenth most viewed broadcast in total the week it aired.

Nancy Banks-Smith of The Guardian called it "one of those shiny and insubtantial series," adding that "all that leaping out of bed at dawn on the pretext that you have to go and sell a house tends to wear thin." Banks-Smith also called the story "slightly unexpected." She also stated "Spooks appears to plume itself on its authenticity, and there are moments, well one moment, so stupid it has to be true." Thomas Sudcliff of The Independent felt it was a "different kind of spy drama" with "a literal description, derived from the sort of rueful story you could imagine being told at an MI5 staff social," and "a lot of bullshit too, naturally. This is one of those dramas where colleagues never make small talk but instead launch straight into an urgent purposive shorthand." Joe Joseph of The Times stated that it "bears a closer resemblance [...] 24," which "shaded the pleasure of this opening episode," but felt that by the end of the episode, Spooks had "established a voice of its own." Gerard O'Donovan of The Telegraph thought that the episode "proved thoroughly entertaining," and praised Wolstencroft's writing, which O'Donovan felt was "confident enough to be playful with its subject - especially regarding Britain's poor-relation relationship with America." Alison Graham of the Radio Times said that after the episode, the series "looks like it's going to be great fun," but "it's presumably not meant to be taken too seriously, because surely life in MI5 can't be this exciting?"
