= Lara Pulver =

English actress (born 1980)

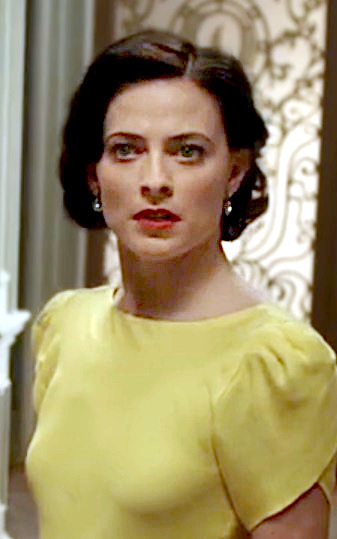
- Pulver in Fleming: The Man Who Would Be Bond, 2013
- Born: 1 September 1980 (age 46); Southend-on-Sea, Essex, England
- Education: Bird College
- Occupation: Actress
- Years active: 2000–present
- Spouses: Josh Dallas (m. 2007; div. 2011); Raza Jaffrey (m. 2014)
- Children: 2

Lara Pulver (born 1 September 1980) is an English film, television, and stage actress. She won the 2016 Laurence Olivier Award for Best Supporting Actress in a Musical in the West End's revival of Gypsy.

Pulver's screen credits include True Blood (2010), Sherlock (2012–2014), Da Vinci's Demons (2013–2015), Fleming: The Man Who Would Be Bond (2014), Spooks (2015), Underworld: Blood Wars (2016), The Alienist: Angel of Darkness (2020), The Witcher: Nightmare of the Wolf (2021), Dota: Dragon's Blood (2021–2022), The Split (2022), Maternal (2023), Blood of Zeus (2024–2025), and MobLand (2025).

== Early life and education ==
Pulver was born in the town of Leigh-on-Sea in Southend-on-Sea, Essex, on 1 September, 1980, and grew up in a village near Sevenoaks, Kent. Her father is from a Jewish family; her mother converted to Judaism when they married. She has a sister, Erika, who is four years older and works as a teacher.

Pulver attended the National Youth Music Theatre between 1994 and 1998, as well as The Liz Burville Dance Centre, Bexley. In 1997, she began studying at the Doreen Bird College of Performing Arts, graduating in 2000.

== Career ==
Pulver was nominated for the 2008 Olivier Award for Best Actress in a Musical for the role of Lucille Frank in the first West End production of the musical Parade at the Donmar Warehouse. She reprised the role in the Los Angeles production at the Mark Taper Forum opposite T.R. Knight.

In 2008, Pulver recorded a song for the CD Act One – Songs from the Musicals of Alexander S. Bermange. Pulver joined the cast of the BBC's Robin Hood in 2009 as Isabella, the sister of Guy of Gisbourne.

In 2010, Pulver joined the cast of the third series of HBO's True Blood as Sookie Stackhouse's fairy godmother, Claudine Crane.

Pulver played Erin Watts, the new chief of Section D, in the tenth and final series of BBC spy drama Spooks, a role she reprised in the 2015 feature film Spooks: The Greater Good

Pulver played Irene Adler in "A Scandal in Belgravia", the first episode of the second series of Sherlock. Her appearance caused an "enormous" response, with the Evening Standard calling the scene where she greets Sherlock Holmes nude "infamous". To The Telegraph, Pulver called the scene "empowering". The BBC received over 100 complaints about the footage. The episode was the most-watched programme on BBC iPlayer from January to April 2012.

In 2012, she joined the cast of Da Vinci's Demons as the "seductive and politically-minded" Clarice Orsini, a series regular and wife of Elliot Cowan's character Lorenzo Medici.

In 2014, she played Louise in a revival of Gypsy at the Chichester Festival Theatre. The production transferred to the West End in April 2015. Pulver won the 2016 Olivier Award for Best Supporting Actress in a Musical for the same role in the Savoy Theatre production of Gypsy. Louise is actually the title role, as "Louise" becomes the real-life early-20th-century American strip-tease sensation Gypsy Rose Lee, on whose memoirs the musical is based. Pulver's co-star in the Savoy production, Imelda Staunton, won the 2016 Olivier Award for Best Actress in a Musical for her role as the larger-than-life Mama Rose.

In 2025, Pulver starred in the Guy Ritchie directed Paramount+ British crime drama television series MobLand, in a cast which includes Tom Hardy, Pierce Brosnan, Paddy Considine, Joanne Froggatt, Helen Mirren, and Geoff Bell. She plays the role of Bella Harrigan, Kevin Harrigan's wife.

== Personal life ==
In 2003, Pulver met American actor Josh Dallas while he was in the UK studying at the Mountview Academy of Theatre Arts. They married in December 2007 in Devon. In an interview on 2 December 2011, Dallas stated they had divorced.

Pulver began dating fellow Spooks actor Raza Jaffrey in 2012 and married on 27 December 2014. The couple have two children.

== Acting credits ==
=== Film ===
Year	Title	Role	Notes
2010	Legacy	Diane Shaw	
2011	Language of a Broken Heart	Violet	
2014	Edge of Tomorrow	Karen Lord	Non-speaking role
2015	A Patch of Fog	Lucy	
2015	Spooks: The Greater Good	Erin Watts	
2016	Underworld: Blood Wars	Semira	
2021	The Witcher: Nightmare of the Wolf	Tetra	Voice role
TBA	The Riders		Filming

=== Television ===
Year	Show	Role	Notes
2009	Robin Hood	Isabella	TV series (8 episodes in Series 3)
2010	The Special Relationship	Intern	TV movie
2010	True Blood	Claudine Crane	TV series (5 episodes)
2011	Spooks	Erin Watts	TV series (main cast in Series 10)
2012, 2014	Sherlock	Irene Adler	"A Scandal in Belgravia" and "The Sign of Three"
2012	Coming Up	Annette	"Camouflage"
2013–2015	Da Vinci's Demons	Clarice Orsini	TV series; main role
2013	Skins: Fire	Victoria	TV series; minor role
2014	Fleming: The Man Who Would Be Bond	Ann O'Neill	TV series (4 episodes); Main role
2015	Spooks: The Greater Good	Erin Watts	Reprising her role from the series
2016–2017	Quantico	Charlotte Bishop	Episodes: "ODENVY" and "EPICSHELTER"
2017	Philip K. Dick's Electric Dreams	Paula	Episode: "Real Life"
2018	The City and the City	Katrynia	TV series
2020	The Alienist: Angel of Darkness	Karen Stratton	TV series
2021–2022	Dota: Dragon's Blood	Princess Mirana	TV series; main voice role
2022	The Split	Kate Pencastle	Main role (series 3)
2022	Pantheon	News Anchor, Olivia	Guest voice role; Episodes: "The Gods Will Not Be Slain", "Olivia & Farhad"
2023	Maternal	Catherine MacDiarmid	TV series; main role
2024–2025	Blood of Zeus	Persephone	11 episodes
2025–present	MobLand	Bella Harrigan	Main role; 10 episodes

=== Stage ===
- Parade (Lucille Frank), Donmar Warehouse, nominated for Laurence Olivier Award for Best Actress in a Musical and WhatsOnStage Award
- Into the Woods (Lucinda), Royal Opera House
- The Last Five Years (Cathy), Menier Chocolate Factory
- Honk! (Henrietta), Royal National Theatre (Laurence Olivier Award for Best New Musical, 2000) and National Tour
- Miss Saigon (Ellen)
- High Society
- A Chorus Line (Bebe)
- The Darling Buds of May
- The Boy Friend
- Gypsy (Louise)
- Chicago
- Grease
- 42nd Street
- The Wizard of Oz
- (Adverts) Smirnoff Vodka Range – Hatter's Summer Night Dream with Smirnoff
- Uncle Vanya
- Guys and Dolls (Sarah Brown), Royal Albert Hall
- Fiddler on the Roof (Golde), Regent's Park Open Air Theatre

=== Other ===
- Game of Thrones (2014; Video Game), as Lady Elissa Forrester
- Sherlock Series By Intouch Games And Slot Factory, as Irene Adler
- Dota 2, as the "Mirana of Nightsilver" persona item, reprising her role from Dragon's Blood

== Awards and nominations ==
=== Television ===
Year	Award	Category	Work	Result	Ref.
2012	Critics' Choice Television Award	Best Actress in a Movie/Miniseries	Sherlock	Nominated	
2012	Online Film Critics Society	Best Supporting Actress in a Motion Picture or Miniseries	Sherlock	Nominated	
2012	Gold Derby TV Awards	TV Movie/Mini Supporting Actress	"A Scandal in Belgravia"	Nominated	
2016	National Film Awards UK	Best Supporting Actress	A Patch of Fog	Nominated	

=== Theatre ===
Year	Award	Category	Work	Result	Ref.
2008	Laurence Olivier Awards	Best Actress in a Musical	Parade	Nominated	
2016	Laurence Olivier Awards	Best Actress in a Supporting Role in a Musical	Gypsy	Won	
2025	Laurence Olivier Awards	Best Actress in a Musical	Fiddler on the Roof	Nominated	
