= Geoffrey Streatfeild =

British actor (born 1975)

- Born: 1975 (age 50–51); London, England
- Years active: 2001–present
- Spouse: Nikki Amuka-Bird (m. 2003; div. 2010)
- Partner: Anna Madeley

Geoffrey Streatfeild (born 1975) is an English actor in film, television, stage and radio.

== Career ==
His notable film and TV roles include The Other Boleyn Girl and Kinky Boots. He also appeared in the Royal Shakespeare Company's "Histories" company in 2007–08 as Prince Hal/Henry V (Henry IV Part One, Henry IV Part Two and Henry V), Suffolk (Henry VI Parts I and II), Rivers (Henry VI Part III and Richard III).

His elder brother Richard Streatfeild, as a serving major in The Rifles, advised Geoffrey on military life for his roles in Henry V and Journey's End. Streatfeild joined the cast of Spooks for its final series in 2011, playing the character of Calum Reed, a Junior Case Officer at MI5 until its end. In 2012 Streatfeild joined the cast of the BBC2 political satire The Thick of It as the "Inbetweener" junior minister in DoSac. In 2015 he reprised his role as Calum Reed in the spy film Spooks: The Greater Good.

In 2026, he is to appear in Helen Edmundson's new play, Some Woman at the National Theatre.

== Personal life ==
Streatfeild was married to the actress Nikki Amuka-Bird from 2003 to 2010. His partner is actress Anna Madeley.

== Selected credits ==
=== Stage ===
- Eigengrau (Bush Theatre) by Penelope Skinner
- The History Boys (National, tour) by Alan Bennett
- Bacchai (National Theatre)
- Mountain Language (Royal Court)
- Journey’s End, as Stanhope (Comedy Theatre) by R. C. Sherriff
- Nathan the Wise (Chichester)
- Merchant of Venice (Chichester) by William Shakespeare
- Macbeth (Sheffield Crucible) by William Shakespeare
- My Night with Reg (Donmar Warehouse and Apollo Theatre) by Kevin Elyot
- The Beaux' Stratagem (National Theatre) by George Farquhar
- Young Chekhov Ivanov (National Theatre) by Anton Chekhov
- Young Chekhov The Seagull (National Theatre) by Anton Chekhov
- Cell Mates (Hampstead Theatre) by Simon Gray in December 2017
- A Mirror (Almeida Theatre (2023), Trafalgar Theatre (2024)) by Sam Holcroft
- Some Woman (National Theatre, 2026) by Helen Edmundson

=== TV ===
- Sword of Honour (2001)
- Love in a Cold Climate (2001)
- The Other Boleyn Girl (2003)
- Elizabeth I (2005)
- Twenty Thousand Streets Under the Sky (2005)
- Midsomer Murders (2005)
- Ashes to Ashes (2009) – As 'New Arrival'
- Spooks (2011)
- The Thick of It (2012)
- Endeavour (2013) As Dr. Daniel Cronyn (in Series 1, Episode 2 'Fugue')
- The Hollow Crown (2016) – as Edward IV, (in 2 episodes: Henry VI part II and Richard III)
- Life (2020)

=== Film ===
- Match Point
- Kinky Boots
- City Slacker
- Spooks: The Greater Good (2015)
- Consent (2023)

=== Radio ===
- The Officers' Ward
- David Copperfield, BBC Radio 4 Woman's Hour Drama, 5–30 December 2005
- Brideshead Revisited
- The Waterbucks, BBC Radio 4 Afternoon Play, 23 November 2005
- Marks
- Richard III
- Much Ado About Nothing
- Nathan The Wise
- The History Boys
- The Pallisers
- The Ballad of Shane O’Neill
- Shylock
- Success Story, BBC Radio 4 Afternoon Play, 6 March 2009
- Modesty Blaise – A Taste for Death, BBC Radio 4 15 Minute Drama, 17–21 December 2012
