= Tom Quinn (Spooks) =

Fictional character from Spooks

- Spooks character
- Matthew Macfadyen as Tom Quinn
- First appearance: "Thou Shalt Not Kill"
- Last appearance: "Series 10, Episode 6"
- Portrayed by: Matthew Macfadyen

In-universe information
- Aliases: Matthew Archer; Steve Wilkes; Davy Crockett; Mr Anderson; John Steadman; David Ghetty; Jack; Mike
- Title: Former Chief of Section D
- Occupation: Former MI5 officer
- Spouse: Christine Dale
- Significant other: Ellie Simm (former)
- Nationality: British (Irish descent)

Tom Quinn is a fictional character portrayed by British actor Matthew Macfadyen in the BBC espionage television series Spooks (called MI-5 in the United States). In the first two series, Tom is the chief of Section D, a counter-terrorism division of MI5.

During the second series, the producers were unsure whether Macfadyen would return for the third; because of this, Tom was originally killed in the second series finale. However, when Macfadyen decided to appear in the first two episodes of the third series, series writer Howard Brenton had to "unkill him." Reaction towards the character by fans were positive, though critics were mixed about Macfadyen's portrayal.

Tom Quinn would later appear again as a cameo on the final episode of Spooks; his brief return was met with generally positive reactions.

== Role in Spooks ==
=== Character arc ===
Tom Quinn joined Section D in 1996, where he eventually became Head of Section D following the imprisonment of predecessor Lucas North (Richard Armitage) during an operation in Russia. Throughout the first series, Tom engages in a relationship with Ellie Simm (Esther Hall), who knows him as "Matthew Archer", a civil servant in IT. In the second episode, Tom performed an undercover operation with fellow officer Helen Flynn (Lisa Faulkner) to recruit the wife of right-wing businessman, Robert Osbourne, who was believed to incite race riots throughout the country.

Osbourne discovers they are spies and attempts to get his hands on information regarding MI5 operations. When Tom fails to cooperate Osbourne tortured Flynn with a deep fryer before killing her. Tom is able to escape and works with Harry to have Osbourne assassinated in retribution. When Tom is shot during a Turkish Consulate raid in the third episode, Tom is forced to admit his true identity and profession, which temporarily puts a strain on their relationship.

In the series one finale, Tom has his home protected in order to keep Ellie and her daughter Maisie safe. However, in the end of the finale, he inadvertently brings home a laptop rigged with C4; Ellie and Maisie become trapped in the house with the bomb. The bomb fails to detonate. However, by the end of the second series premiere, Ellie leaves Tom, claiming that he will always choose his job over her.

=== Characteristics ===
Tom Quinn is depicted as "serious, focused and popular" with his team, as well as "deeply intelligent", with "impeccable instincts." Throughout the first series, Tom has a relationship with Ellie Simm. In the first few episodes, Tom deals with keeping his true identity secret, but not being truthful to Ellie is "eating away at him." Ultimately, Tom tells her the truth, and she later leaves him in the beginning of the second series as a consequence.

Throughout the second series, Tom's "journey" has evolved slowly, where his attitude to his work has changed, and his conscience has "kicked in", finding himself questioning the world he is in. In Tom's final episode, writer Howard Brenton described Tom as not disillusioned, but "sort of becomes a human being."

== Conceptual history ==
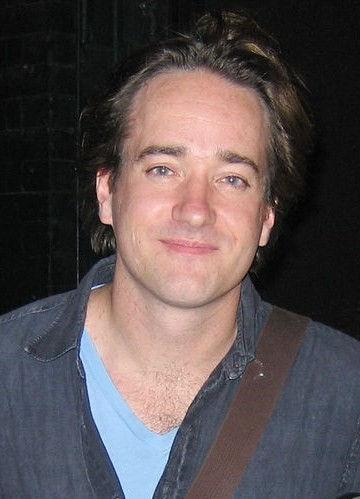
Matthew Macfadyen plays Tom Quinn.

Series creator David Wolstencroft believed that writing Tom was the most fun, yet the hardest work compared with other characters, because he was Spooks' primary protagonist. Wolstencroft chose a job in Information Technology (IT) as the cover story Tom used in his relationship with Ellie, because he felt that in real life people are reluctant to ask questions about IT work. To portray the character, actor Matthew Macfadyen followed the scripts, and did not want to deviate from them, as he did not believe doing so would be useful. Macfadyen was also keen to explore parts of Tom from within him for influence.

During production of the first series, Macfadyen, along with co stars Keeley Hawes and David Oyelowo were wary of playing the lead characters in their mid-twenties, but since felt they earned the right to be in the series. During production of episodes three and five of the first series, Macfadyen burst a blood vessel on one of his eyes. Macfadyen compensated by wearing sunglasses in order to hide it. Halfway through filming series two, Macfadyen got to carry a gun for the first time in the series; he was disappointed in not carrying one in the first series.

Though Macfadyen enjoyed working in the series, he began to feel "very sluggish and fed up" with playing the same character for two years. When the producers knew Macfadyen planned to leave, they did not know whether or not he would appear in the beginning of the third series. Howard Brenton, who wrote the series two finale, originally killed Tom off by drowning him while trying to escape onto the North Sea, while labouring under the impression that he was not to return.

The producers would have continued the third series without Tom, however when they heard the actor would be prepared to return for the first two episodes of the third series, they were rewritten to include his character Tom. Brenton had to "unkill him." After a seven-year absence, in October 2011, it was announced that Macfadyen was to make a "fleeting" cameo appearance in the final episode of the series. A Spooks insider stated that his scene "will bring back all the memories of Tom and what the character endured in those first few series."

== Reception ==
The character gained Matthew Macfadyen recognition during his tenure on Spooks, but since his departure, Macfadyen stated that "no one notices me now." Fan reaction of the character proved positive. In the "Best of Drama" viewer polls at BBC Online, Macfadyen was voted fifth in the "Best Actor" category in 2002, ahead of co-star Peter Firth, who was voted 21st. He would later be voted fourth in 2003, and then fifth again in 2004; co-star Rupert Penry-Jones was voted third in the same category. Furthermore, the scene entitled "Tom's death (or was it?)" in the cliffhanger of series two, was voted second in the "Favourite Moment" category in 2003, beaten only by the return of "Dirty Den" Watts in EastEnders.

Critical reaction towards the character was generally mixed. In a DVD review of the first series, Michael Mackenzie of Home Cinema thought Macfadyen was not a very good actor and believed "he seems to be in some sort of contest with Keanu Reeves to see how long he can maintain the same lifeless facial expression," but thought the character himself, particularly his personal life, mostly worked well for the most part as it continues "as a standard soap opera."

In review of the second series, Dennis Landmann of MovieFreak praised the "drama and intensity that builds around his character," noting Tom's somewhat "haunted soul" and the last five minutes of the last episode "were so powerful they affected how I felt for the next couple of days; I kept thinking about the character and the tragic events that happened to him." In the third series, Mackenzie praised the episode where Tom tries to clear his name, but thought his exit was "not particularly satisfying." However, David Blackwell of Enterline Media thought that his farewell scene was "one of [his] best moments of the first two episode (in addition to the way Tom acts in the opening episode)."

Critical reaction toward Tom's cameo appearance was met with generally positive reviews. Christopher Hootan of Metro opined "the return of Tom Quinn as a hired assassin in the final few seconds was a nice nod to early series of show." Rob McLaughlin of Den of Geek noted that Tom's return among the final few minutes of the show was "a welcome return from an old friend," while Dork Adore reviewer Nick Bryan called it "a nice touch," also reflecting that it "nailed home the central moral: no-one ever escapes from the horror. (Especially since that guy was written out of the show due to an attack of conscience, yet is now doing Harry’s dirty work.)" Vicky Frost of The Guardian meanwhile, felt the cameo "made no sense at all. Obviously it was super cheesy," but she "obviously" "completely loved it – despite knowing it was coming."
