= Bharat Nalluri =

British-Indian director

- Born: 1965 (age 60–61); Repalle, Andhra Pradesh, India
- Education: Royal Grammar School; Northern Film School
- Occupations: Film director, television director
- Years active: 1994–present
- Spouse: Kylie Morris
- Children: 2

Bharat Nalluri (born 1965) is a British–Indian film and television director.

== Personal life ==
Nalluri was born in India. He moved to England at a young age with his family and grew up in Newcastle upon Tyne, where he attended the Royal Grammar School, Newcastle. He has an MA in Film from The Northern School of Film and Television.

He is married to journalist Kylie Morris, the former Washington correspondent for the UK's Channel 4 News.

== Career ==
Nalluri directed a miniseries for HBO called Tsunami: The Aftermath, for which he was nominated for a Primetime Emmy. This two-part drama starring Chiwetel Ejiofor, Sophie Okenedo, Tim Roth, Hugh Bonneville and Toni Collette, told the story of the tragic events that occurred in Thailand in December 2004. Ejiofor and Okenedo garnered NAACP nominations for best supporting actor and best actress, which Okenedo went on to win. Toni Collette was nominated for a Golden Globe for best supporting actress.

In 2014, he directed the pilot for Emmy nominated TV series The 100 for Warner Bros and The CW. It ran for seven seasons.

In addition to his television work Nalluri has worked extensively in film. In 2007, Nalluri directed the feature film Miss Pettigrew Lives for a Day starring Amy Adams and Frances McDormand which had a successful theatrical release in the U.S. In 2014 he returned to Spooks (aka MI-5), which had by this time finished its ten-season run, to direct the feature film spin-off Spooks: The Greater Good. It starred Kit Harington. His latest film is The Man Who Invented Christmas, starring Dan Stevens, Christopher Plummer and Jonathan Pryce and was released by Bleecker Street in November 2017.

== Filmography ==
Film

- Downtime (1997)
- Killing Time (1998)
- The Crow: Salvation (2000)
- Miss Pettigrew Lives for a Day (2008)
- Spooks: The Greater Good (2015)
- The Man Who Invented Christmas (2017)
- Flavia (2026)

Television

- New Voices (1994–1995, two episodes)
- Shockers (2001, Episode: "Cyclops")
- Spooks (2002–2011, six episodes)
- Hustle (2004, three episodes)
- Life on Mars (2006, two episodes)
- The Hunters (2006, TV movie)
- Tsunami: The Aftermath (2006, miniseries)
- Cupid (2009, pilot episode)
- Outcasts (2011, two episodes)
- Torchwood: Miracle Day (2011, Episode: "The New World")
- Emily Owens, M.D. (2012–2013, five episodes)
- The 100 (2014, pilot episode)
- The Player (2015, pilot episode)
- Mars Project (2016, unaired pilot)
- Little America (2020, episode: "The Cowboy")
- Professionals (2020–2022, three episodes)
- Shantaram (2022, three episodes)
- Boy Swallows Universe (2024)
- Last Days of the Space Age (2024)
