= Dragon Age II =

2011 video game

- Developer: BioWare (Note: Ported to Mac OS X by TransGaming)
- Publisher: Electronic Arts
- Director: Mark Darrah
- Designer: Mike Laidlaw
- Programmer: Jacques Lebrun
- Artist: Matthew Goldman
- Writer: David Gaider
- Composer: Inon Zur
- Series: Dragon Age
- Engine: Lycium Engine
- Platforms: Mac OS X; PlayStation 3; Windows; Xbox 360
- Release: NA: March 8, 2011; AU: March 10, 2011; EU: March 11, 2011
- Genre: Action role-playing
- Mode: Single-player

Dragon Age II is a 2011 action role-playing video game developed by BioWare and published by Electronic Arts (EA). It is the second major game in the Dragon Age series and the successor to Dragon Age: Origins (2009). Set in the world of Thedas, players assume the role of Hawke, a human mage, rogue, or warrior who arrives in the city of Kirkwall as a lowly refugee, and becomes its legendary champion over a turbulent decade of political and social conflict. In the game, players explore and engage in combat from a third-person perspective. Players encounter various companions, who play major roles in the game's plot and gameplay. Depending on players' decisions and dialogue, a companion will either recognize Hawke as a friend or a rival.

BioWare began the game's development during the production of Origins's expansion pack Awakening. EA gave them only 16 months to finish the game's development, thus forcing the team to crunch for an extended period and cut a significant number of quests. Nearly the entirety of the game is set in a single city, so BioWare can reuse existing assets to extend the game's length. They were inspired by Eternal Darkness, in which players can see how the city changes over the years. BioWare looked at players' feedback and reviews of Origins, and decided to improve its gameplay, making it more action-oriented. They improved the Eclipse Engine, renaming it Lycium, to enhance the game's visuals and lighting, and accommodate a new art style inspired by movies like Yojimbo and Conan. Mike Laidlaw, David Gaider and Inon Zur returned to their roles as lead designer, writer and composer respectively.

Announced in July 2010, the game was released for Microsoft Windows, PlayStation 3, Xbox 360 and OS X in March 2011. The game received generally positive reviews from critics, who praised its gameplay, companions and writing; although changes to the storytelling structure and the combat system had a more mixed reception. The limited setting and reused assets were widely criticized. It received a more polarized response from players, though more than one million copies were sold in less than two weeks, a faster sales pace than its predecessor. Upon launch, BioWare supported the game with several downloadable content packs. A sequel, Dragon Age: Inquisition was released in November 2014.

== Gameplay ==
In this gameplay screenshot, the player character Hawke and his companions combat a dragon from a third-person perspective.

Dragon Age II is an action role-playing game played from a third-person perspective. In the game, players control a human named Hawke, a refugee during the Fifth Blight, who eventually becomes the Champion of Kirkwall. Hawke's sex and appearance can be customized, and players need to select their class at the beginning of the game. There are three class types: a mage (who wields a magical staff to cast spells), a rogue (who wields a dagger or bow and arrow), or a warrior (who wields a melee weapon in both hands, or with a shield). Players can incorporate choices they made in Origins to the game by importing their saved game, or choosing a background at the starter menu, which bring modifications to the game's narrative.

During combat and exploration, players are accompanied by different companions, who can be recruited into Hawke's party. Hawke can only bring three companions with them, while others stay in different home bases in Kirkwall. Though players can directly control these companions and switch between them freely, they are usually controlled by artificial intelligence, which can be modified by players using the "Tactic" menu. For instance, players can customize a companion's stance to be aggressive, and set their behaviors like consuming health potions when they get injured. During battles, players may pause the game and issue commands to both Hawke and party members separately. Players can also move the camera freely in the PC version. However, commands cannot be queued, meaning that players can only issue a new command after the previous one is completed. In addition to basic attacks, players can utilize different talents. For instance, warriors can stun enemies with the "Tremor" ability while mages can unleash fireballs to burn enemies, though some talents drain the character's stamina or mana. Skills can be used to supplement each other to create combos, which further enhance combat efficiency. Defeated companions are automatically revived after all enemies are eliminated, but they will suffer from injuries.

The game features an inventory system that acts as an item storage. There are several types of items: weapons and armors, crafting recipes, runes, plot items and consumables. Players must micro-manage the inventory system. A player can only carry a certain amount of equipment, though extra inventory space can be purchased. In the game, players encounter different containers and loot, as well as merchants who sell different items. Some items give players perks that improve their statistics. Only Hawke can equip armors found in the game's world. Companions' armors cannot be changed, but players can collect armor upgrades for them, and customize them with rings, amulets, and belts. Weapons can be enchanted using runes which introduce new properties to the weapon on which they are inscribed. Upon discovering crafting recipes, Hawke can contact craftsmen to create new items like potions, poisons, bombs, and runes. In the game, players may also collect different junk items that can be sold to merchants.

As players complete quests and kill enemies, players earn experience points. After earning enough experience points, they will level up. In addition to having more health, stamina and mana, players can also unlock new talents and upgrade the character's attributes. These are divided into six categories: Strength, Dexterity, Magic, Cunning, Willpower and Constitution. A skill tree is present for players to unlock talents in a non-linear manner. Unlocked talents can be upgraded further to enhance their effectiveness. On reaching a certain level, Hawke can specialize in a sub-class. Each companion has talents that are exclusive to them, and can be upgraded as players progress. Skills such as crafting and lockpicking are unlocked automatically when players' attributes are high enough.

Outside combat, players engage in dialogue, asking or answering questions. A dialogue tree offers several dialogue options for players to select. There are three main personality types: diplomatic, humorous, or aggressive. The most chosen option becomes Hawke's core personality type. Hawke can also tell lies, bribe or extort money from others, and flirt with non-playable characters. In the game, players will make many decisions that lead to different consequences for both Hawke's party and the game's world. The approval system from Origins has been adjusted into a friendship/rivalry system. Depending on players' decisions and dialogue choices, a companion will either recognize Hawke as a friend or a rival. A companion who consistently agrees with Hawke's views considers them a friend, while a companion who consistently disagrees with Hawke forms a tense but respectful rivalry with them. Full friendship unlocks bonuses which generally benefit Hawke or the party, while full rivalry boosts combat ability for companions to help them outdo Hawke in competition. To improve the relationship with a companion, certain items can be gifted to them. Up to five companions are romance options for Hawke regardless of friendship and rivalry.

== Synopsis ==
=== Setting ===
The player selects a preset or imported story to determine the events of Dragon Age: Origins. This forms the background story of Dragon Age II. The main story has a linear frame narrative, unfolding through flashbacks from the perspective of the game's unreliable narrator, a dwarf rogue named Varric Tethras (Brian Bloom) with a humorous though caring personality. The protagonist is Hawke (voiced by either Nicholas Boulton or Jo Wyatt), whose sex, first name, appearance, and class type is player-determined. During the events of Origins, Hawke fled the nation of Ferelden as a refugee to the city-state of Kirkwall. There they eventually grew in power and influence to become the legendary "Champion of Kirkwall", and the center of events that change the course of history. Varric, Hawke's companion, relates the Champion's "true story" to his interrogator Cassandra Pentaghast (Miranda Raison), mainly based on the protagonist's choices. The story is told in three acts, with each act separated by a gap of almost three years. Although the story remains unaltered until the two endings, it is greatly influenced by the player's decisions.

Hawke can recruit up to eight companions, each of whom can be player-controlled. Along with Varric, mandatory companions include Anders (Adam Howden), a proud but mercurial mage and former Grey Warden determined to defend the mages in Kirkwall from the Templars; Aveline Vallen (Joanna Roth), a pragmatic and strict warrior who rises up the ranks of the Kirkwall City Guard to become its leader; and Merrill (Eve Myles), a soft-hearted but socially awkward Dalish elven mage shunned by her clan due to her obsession with a dangerous ancient artifact as well as her use of blood magic. As well, one of Hawke's two siblings serves as a companion for the story's first act: their sister Bethany (Rebekah Staton), a kind though timid mage who has a loving relationship with her sibling; or their brother Carver (Nico Lennon), a prideful and abrasive warrior who cares for Hawke but feels overshadowed by them.

Optional companions include Fenris (Gideon Emery), a powerful elven warrior seeking revenge on his former slaver; and Isabela (Victoria Kruger), a confident and promiscuous pirate captain searching for a coveted relic. Sebastian Vael (Alec Newman), a master archer and pious layman of the Kirkwall Chantry, can be recruited via the downloadable content, The Exiled Prince. Anders, Fenris, Isabela and Merrill are romance options for Hawke of either sex, with Sebastian a chaste love interest for a female Hawke.

=== Plot ===
Cassandra seeks out Hawke, the "Champion of Kirkwall", with the Seekers, an offshoot of the Templars. She captures and interrogates Varric, demanding to know how Hawke started a war between the mages and Templars. Varric complies and tells her how the war started. The story starts shortly after the Battle of Ostagar, with the Hawke family escaping their home village of Lothering in Ferelden with a darkspawn horde in pursuit. Either Bethany or Carver (Hawke's siblings) are killed in the process. Flemeth, a witch who can assume the form of a dragon, helps the party escape to Kirkwall, a city across the sea, provided Hawke completes a task for her. Hawke enters the service of a mercenary band or smuggler group to enter Kirkwall, after which the family takes up residence in the city's Lowtown with Hawke's uncle Gamlen.

A year later, a prosperous opportunity presents itself to Hawke; Varric and his brother Bartrand are planning a treasure hunting expedition into the perilous region of the Deep Roads. Varric partners with Hawke to acquire funding and knowledge of the region. Hawke enlists the aid of Anders, a former Grey Warden with knowledge of the Deep Roads. However, a magical red lyrium idol corrupts Bartrand's mind and causes him to betray Hawke and Varric. Additionally, Hawke's surviving sibling is either killed by the darkspawn taint, or conscripted into the Grey Wardens if they are brought along. If not, then they are conscripted either into the Circle of Mages or the Templar Order, depending on the sibling who survives. Despite this, Hawke and Varric are able to escape back to the surface, and the proceeds from the expedition make Hawke famous and wealthy, enabling them to buy back their family mansion in Hightown.

Three years later, the Viscount of Kirkwall summons Hawke to help resolve a political situation caused by the foreign military forces of the Qunari. The Qunari, shipwrecked in Kirkwall three years earlier, neither obey Kirkwall's laws nor seem willing to leave, escalating tension between them and the inhabitants of Kirkwall. Hawke's mother, Leandra, is murdered by a blood mage serial killer preying on Kirkwall's women. Hawke resolves to uncover "O", the identity of the serial killer's accomplice, but eventually discovers the reason the Qunari refuse to leave Kirkwall is because Isabela stole a coveted artifact from them, which they are not allowed to return to their homeland of Par Vollen without. When she flees Kirkwall with the artifact, the Qunari leader, the Arishok, decides to attack Kirkwall and executes the Viscount. Hawke's party successfully retakes Kirkwall and, if Hawke chooses, eliminates the Arishok. Hawke is declared the Champion of Kirkwall in the aftermath.

After another three years, Kirkwall is turned into a police state under the tyrannical rule of the Templars. Under the command of Knight-Commander Meredith, they aim to oppress mages for their use of blood magic. Meredith is challenged by First Enchanter Orsino, the Circle of Magi leader in Kirkwall, who tries to topple her with public support. Constant violence between the two sides forces the Champion of Kirkwall to intervene, during which a group of anti-Meredith rebels kidnap Hawke's surviving sibling/closest friend. Fearing for their loved ones' safety, Hawke attempts to get away from the conflict. However, Anders orchestrates an explosion that levels the Chantry and kills Grand Cleric Elthina. This triggers a battle between the mages and templars across the city, forcing Hawke to choose a side. They end up killing both Orsino, who is surmised to have been "O", and Meredith, who bought the lyrium idol from Bartrand, which has corrupted her mind and convinced her to go through a mass extermination of mages. Afterwards, Hawke either leaves Kirkwall as a hero to mages, or is elected the city's Viscount.

Varric concludes the story, saying that eventually, Hawke's companions drifted apart, and Hawke left Kirkwall. The Circles of Magi all over Thedas have followed Kirkwall's example and rebelled, with the Templars breaking away from the Chantry to fight them. Cassandra lets Varric go and leaves with Leliana and fellow Seekers, believing that since both Hawke and the Warden have disappeared, they must be found to stop the war.

== Development ==
BioWare's Edmonton office began development of Dragon Age II during the production of Dragon Age: Origins - Awakening. Publisher Electronic Arts gave BioWare only 14 to 16 months to finish the game's development, forcing the team to crunch for an extended period. Mike Laidlaw, David Gaider and Inon Zur returned to their roles as lead designer, writer and composer respectively. The game's development was completed on February 11, 2011, with BioWare confirming it had been declared gold, indicating it was being prepared for duplication and release. The game was ported to Mac OS X by TransGaming via the Cider engine.

=== Game design ===
One of BioWare's core goals when creating the game was to improve the formula established in Origins. According to Laidlaw, the team evaluated Origins different gameplay components, especially its overly complex mechanics, and studied players' feedback. After learning most players never finished the early hours of Origins, the team's goal was to make Dragon Age II more accessible to new players, and appeal to more players. They decided to streamline some of the game's mechanics, while retaining many conventional elements of a role-playing game. The team also looked at reviews of Origins, and realized that one of the common criticisms, especially of the console versions, focused on the game's slow combat. As a result, the team looked at gameplay of action games and sped up its combat so it would be more responsive and give more immediate responses without latency. The game's combat animation was made to be more reactive and "stylish" to reflect this. While it became more action-orientated, the team did not completely remove the tactical aspect of Origins as they felt that would alienate its fan base. Despite this, the bird's-eye view from Origins was removed as the team wanted to create more varied scenery for players without needing to "slice off" the top of a room. Laidlaw added the gameplay is more tactical in nature as the team overhauled the combo system which prompts players to make use of all the classes' talents. According to Robyn Theberge, the game's development manager, the team hoped players could "think like a general" using Tactic, and "fight like a spartan" with the game's faster combat.

The works of Pieter Bruegel, Sergio Leone and Akira Kurosawa, as well as the 1982 film, Conan the Barbarian, inspired the game. The team aimed to create art that was "memorable" and stylistic as they addressed a shortcoming of Origins where locales looked largely unremarkable. The team also aimed to have consistent graphic designs throughout the game to rectify Origins's visual inconsistencies. The game's races featured redesigns so they look more distinctive. For instance, the Qunari now have a pair of horns, as opposed to their hornless counterparts in Origins. Due to the game's short development cycle, BioWare set the game in a single city so they could reuse many art assets. Laidlaw added the team drew inspiration from Eternal Darkness where players get to see the city evolve as time progresses. This meant the team only had to modify the assets and did not need to create new ones.

While Origins was developed mainly for personal computers, BioWare developed Dragon Age II for both PCs and consoles, hoping players of both machines could enjoy the same experience. The game's controls, including the Tactic menu and commands, as well as its story are identical across all the versions, though there are differences in their user interfaces. Laidlaw described porting Origins to the PlayStation 3 as a terrible experience. Learning from it, the team redesigned all of their art assets to make the game look better graphically. The game was powered by an improved version of the Eclipse Engine. Renamed Lycium, it was designed to accommodate the game's new art style. Neil Thompson, BioWare's art and animation director, revealed in 2013 the team was disappointed by the game's visuals as the Eclipse Engine had become outdated by the time the game was released, leading to mediocre visuals. The game's lighting was largely improved by the introduction of global illumination in the game's engine. New tools for sky editing and water rendering were introduced to further enhance the game's visuals.

=== Production ===
Gaider and five other writers penned the game's narrative. The team hoped to move away from Origins' narrative formula. It was criticized for being a predictable and formulaic hero journey. As a result, the team decided to make the narrative more "personal", focusing on one character over the course of several years with a framed structure that allows the story to skip periods that do not interest players. To offer a more focused experience, the team decided to ditch players' origin stories. Inspired by Planescape: Torment, Hawke is fully voiced as opposed to the Warden (the silent player character in Origins). The story's tone was also considered darker than its predecessor. Gaider believed this approach introduced new opportunities for storytelling, as consequences of a player's decisions can be highlighted further, and the state of the game's world can be radically changed. Laidlaw added that with choices having more impact, Dragon Age II would be BioWare's "most reactive game". There were different types of choices in the game, namely flavors, local choices and global choices. Some have little effect on the game's narrative, while others may affect the story dramatically. As players have no knowledge of the extent of the impact a choice will bring, the team hoped they had created a more individualized experience. Like its predecessor, the choices presented were not "black or white", so players are motivated to do what they deem is appropriate.

The team used an approach called a "one-pager", where the general overview of the story was produced; then the writers expanded the smaller components. The team also used a wiki to store the game's lore to keep it consistent. All story content was reviewed twice. The first, named a "white box" interview, was used to evaluate its pacing and the choices presented, while the second, named an "orange box" interview, was used to flesh out the details of each quest. Though players can import saves from Origins into the game, the narrative was not changed significantly because the team wanted to acknowledge players' choices and pay homage to certain characters, without having to create "obligatory cameos" of characters. The team also felt that new players would be alienated if Origins' story arc continued in the sequel. Laidlaw added that unlike Mass Effect, Dragon Age is more about the place and the setting than the characters. According to Gaider, the game was about "freedom versus security", as reflected by the conflicts between the mages and the Templars. The game had 103 minutes of cutscenes, and nearly half a million lines of dialogue.

In 2021, Gaider said that the game was originally planned as an expansion pack to Origins. He also said that there's "a fantastic game hidden under a mountain of compromises, cut corners, and tight deadlines" and if he could redo parts of the game, some of the changes would include an expanded opening, a romance with Varric, the restoration of act three plot points, and an endgame option to avoid choosing sides. In 2026, David Gaider revealed that BioWare had planned for Dragon Age II to be a major title during its first four months of development. However, as EA rushed production, Gaider and his writing team had to cut half of the game's quests. To meet the tight deadline, Gaider also lacked time to thoroughly review his writers' work, resulting in a writing style he described as "raw".

=== Music ===
As the game focuses on Hawke's family and their adventures in the world, Zur used a string quartet to play the solo, while the orchestra had a supporting role. He introduced Middle-eastern sounds for the city of Kirkwall, since it was foreign to the Hawke family. Zur collaborated with Aubrey Ashburn, who sang the main title and several songs in the game, an Israeli songwriter, and Florence and The Machine, whose song "I'm Not Calling You a Liar" was reimagined for the game. Like its predecessor, the game's music is a cross between "heroic" and "demonic". According to Zur, he was given more creative freedom by BioWare since the style of the game's music had already been established in Origins.

== Marketing and release ==
Ahead of the game's release producer Fernando Melo said he wanted to draw a larger audience for the game than Origins: "We have data that shows there are a lot of people that enjoy playing RPGs although they won't necessarily call them RPGs. They'll play Fallout, Assassin's Creed and even Call of Duty, which have these progression elements – you're putting points into things – but they don't necessarily associate that as an RPG. So we think that if we expand that out we'll attract a much bigger audience."

Electronic Arts announced Dragon Age II in July 2010. They released a public demo of the game, which was available from February 22 to March 1, 2011. Players who pre-ordered the game received two exclusive weapons. Players who had pre-ordered the game before January 11, 2011 also had access to the "BioWare Signature Edition", which included new items and missions, a new companion, and a digital version of the game's original soundtrack. BioWare partnered with Razer to launch a gaming periphery product line called the "Collector's Edition Product Line". A Facebook tie-in game called Dragon Age Legends, a 2D role-playing strategy game, was announced in November 2010 for release in March 2011. Players of Dead Space 2 received an exclusive armor in the game modeled after Dead Space's protagonist Isaac Clarke.

Dragon Age II went on sale in North America and Europe on March 8 and 11, 2011, respectively. The game was removed from the digital Steam storefront by the Valve in July 2011. According to EA, the reason was they had breached Valve's policy, which "[limits] how developers interact with customers to sell downloadable content (DLC)". About a month after the game's release, EA rewarded early adopters of the game with a free download code for Mass Effect 2, another BioWare title. The game became a backward compatible title on Xbox One on May 3, 2018.

Six downloadable content packs for Dragon Age II were released between March 2011 and October 2011. The content ranges from minor in-game item packs to more significant plot-driven campaign modules. Major packs include Legacy and Mark of The Assassin, which advance the narrative of the Dragon Age series as a whole. In Legacy, Hawke investigates a prison constructed by the Grey Wardens, which holds a powerful and ancient darkspawn. In Mark of The Assassin, Hawke must infiltrate an estate outside Kirkwall and steal a precious relic. An expansion pack entitled The Exalted March had been in development, but was cancelled as the studio decided to focus on tweaking the Frostbite engine, which would be used for their future games.

A mini-series titled Dragon Age: Redemption, which features Felicia Day in the lead role of Tallis was announced in February 2011. Peter Winther directed the series, John Bartley served as its cinematographer, and Day was involved in its scriptwriting. The six-part webseries premiered on October 10, 2011, one day before the release of the Mark of The Assassin DLC pack where Tallis appears as a guest companion.

== Reception ==
=== Critical reception ===
Reception

Aggregate score
Aggregator	Score
Metacritic	(PC) 82/100 (PS3) 82/100 (X360) 79/100

Review scores
Publication	Score
Destructoid	7/10
Eurogamer	8/10
Game Informer	(X360) 8.25/10 (PC) 7.75/10
GameSpot	8/10
GameSpy	4/5
GamesRadar+	4/5
IGN	8.5/10
PC Gamer (US)	94/100

The game received received "generally favorable" reviews according to review aggregator website Metacritic. Laidlaw admitted the team never expected the game to perform as well as Origins, but he thought the title would score higher.

Several critics praised the game's combat noting it was faster than its predecessor. Joe Juba of Game Informer praised it for being "responsive" and believed the new system suited the game. IGN's Kristine Steimer praised the combat, which integrated action elements and tactical features together well, for being "entertaining" and "versatile". However, she found issues with the console controls' imprecision and AI weaknesses. Mike Sharkey of GameSpy described the gameplay as "smooth". He noted its improved user interface, and felt it was a "great fusion" of both action and strategic elements, though he remarked that deploying strategy is not as necessary as before. GamesRadar's Eric Neigher was disappointed by the "cumbersome" strategy system, which made the combat excessively straightforward. Rich McCormick of PC Gamer liked the game's talents and abilities, saying they are "exciting" to use. VanOrd appreciated its flexibility, though he thought it was streamlined, alongside the inventory management system. Both GameSpot's VanOrd and Juba noted there were issues with the third-person gameplay in the PC version.

The game's storytelling attracted mixed responses. The use of an unreliable narrator was applauded for holding the story together in a cohesive manner by McCormick, and being entertaining by Steimer. Sharkey liked the three-act structure, comparing it to "historical fiction reads" that explores a "tumultuous period in a fully realized fantasy world". Neigher thought the three-act structure delivered a "compelling" story, and appreciated the game's writing, calling it a step-up from Origins. VanOrd disliked the game's storytelling, however, calling it a "downward turn" from Origins as it lacked a central goal that engaged players, thus making the story less epic than it should be. However, he remarked that there were "heartfelt moments", mostly associated with the game's sidequests and companions. Juba agreed with VanOrd on the story's shortcomings, saying that there was little tension or consequences in the main story, and it felt like several side-quests stitched together. However, he praised the scenarios for being creative and inventive. Both VanOrd and Eurogamer's Dan Whitehead noted the game drew inspiration from real-life events when the writing team created the setting and its cultural and political conflicts. Whitehead called it "a political game".

Critics had varied opinions on the game's dialogue system. McCormick felt the lack of a morality system enabled players to pick different dialogue stances depending on different circumstances, as opposed to being funneled to role-play a certain personality. He praised the game's three-act structure for making choices consequential. Decisions made earlier may result in a significant difference several years later in the game. McCormick called this "impressive". Sharkey and Whitehead liked the choices presented, and felt they were impactful and often morally ambiguous. VanOrd agreed, and attributed it to the setting's unstable political climate. He was disappointed that some choices were merely illusions, but felt there were more impactful decisions in the game than in Origins. However, Steimer felt there were not a lot of impactful choices in the game, and criticized the cliffhanger ending. Joseph Leray of Destructoid commented on the game's pacing, saying that "Act I is too long, Act III is too short, and Act II feels like the climax of the game but is largely tangential to the main plot".

Critics praised the companions featured in the game. Steimer liked the background banter between the companions, saying they are "heartwarming" and "hilarious". Sharkey felt the characters were exceptional, calling them BioWare's best, though he was disappointed by the fact their armor could not be customized. Neigher also liked the companions, saying they were more fleshed out and less "expository". Both Whitehead and VanOrd felt the companions were not as interesting as the original game, though VanOrd noted their personalities are "vivid" nonetheless, and all the companions were excellently voiced and their lines were well-written. Juba, however, found the companions superior to those in Origins. Leray liked the companion quests, singling out Merill's and Aveline's as two of the best. However, he lamented the game did not offer enough opportunities to interact with its cast of companions. Revisiting Dragon Age II in 2015, Chris Thursten of PC Gamer praised the game's handling of its roster of companions, noting that "they have their own homes, jobs and opinions". Thrusten also praised the complex relationships they have with each other. He noted that Hawke's decade in Kirkwall is primarily an exploration of these relationships and concluded that "BioWare has not created a narrative with this much nuance since, nor so many clever moments...".

Reused assets and the game being set entirely in Kirkwall were criticized. Some critics felt the game confined players to a very small city. Steimer felt the rich lore featured in the game was wasted. McCormick felt the small world helped players become more thoroughly engaged in it, able to understand its culture and politics due to its small scale. Sharkey called certain areas in the game "carbon-copy dungeon crawls", and was disappointed by the excessive reuse of areas. Neigher added that the backtracking featured in the game gave the impression it was more linear than its predecessor. Juba felt the game's locations were "painfully limited", and players would get tired of them after a while. Leray criticized the assets for being "bland", saying that reusing them made the issue even worse. Like Juba, he felt that locations would become "stale" as players progress and that the city has too few people of interest or missions for players to complete.

Before the game's release, players of Dragon Age: Origins were worried the sequel would be streamlined like Mass Effect. Head writer David Gaider assured fans of Origins this was not the case. While BioWare expected fan criticism over the changes implemented in the sequel, they were surprised by the polarized response from players. EA acknowledged the game's reception among fans, saying that they "lost some [Origins] fans" with the game's release. Much of the player criticism was directed at the game's reusing of environments and the single city setting.

The Academy of Interactive Arts & Sciences nominated Dragon Age II for "Outstanding Achievement in Connectivity" at the 15th Annual Interactive Achievement Awards.

=== Controversies ===
A BioWare employee was caught posting as a consumer on Metacritic. The employee, Chris Hoban, gave the game score of 10/10. An EA representative responded after much online controversy saying it is normal for people who work on a game to like and support it, though it is unclear if Hoban acted on his own or at the behest of the company.

The game was criticized for allegedly using SecuROM digital rights management software, though BioWare refuted the allegations and added they merely used a release date checker (made by the company that produced SecuROM) that deletes itself after the game is released.

In early 2011, shortly after the release of Dragon Age II, one player made a forum post on BioWare's then-active social forums expressing their distaste for unwanted homosexual advances, and asked for a much bigger focus on straight male gamers as well as an option to remove homosexual content. Gaider replied by saying the game is designed to be inclusive and for everyone, and that making romances for both sexes was less costly than creating new ones. Ultimately, this culminated in a harassment campaign against Dragon Age II writer Jennifer Hepler, culminating in death threats against her.

=== Sales ===
Dragon Age II was the best-selling retail game in the UK in its week of release according to Chart-Track, outselling competitors including Pokémon Black and White. Worldwide, the game sold more than one million copies in less than two weeks, a faster sales pace than its predecessor when it was released in 2009. By May 2011, it has sold over two million copies.

== Sequel ==
The aftermath of the game's ending is explored in the 2011 tie-in novel, Dragon Age: Asunder. A sequel, Dragon Age: Inquisition, was released for Microsoft Windows, PlayStation 4 and Xbox One in November 2014. The villain from the Legacy DLC, Corypheus, returns as the primary antagonist in Inquisition, and Hawke appears as a non-playable support character.
