= Ostagar =

Ostagar may refer to:

- a fortress in the 2009 video game Dragon Age: Origins.
- Dragon Age: Origins – Return to Ostagar, a downloadable content pack for Dragon Age: Origins.
- 13 Feku Ostagar Lane, a 1966 Bangla film.
