= List of Dragon Age II characters =

Playable characters in Dragon Age II. From left to right: Fenris, Isabela, Varric, Aveline, "Hawke" (the player character), Carver, Merrill, Anders, Bethany, Sebastian. Not pictured: Tallis, who only appears in the DLC pack Mark of the Assassin.

Dragon Age II, the second main video game in BioWare's Dragon Age series, features an ensemble cast of characters. Several returning characters from its predecessor Dragon Age: Origins may appear in a major or minor capacity, including Flemeth, Anders, Merrill, Isabela, Alistair, Zevran, Leliana, Marethari, Bodahn and Sandal Feddic.

The player character is Hawke, a human who lived in the Ferelden village of Lothering prior to the Fifth Blight. The overarching narrative of Dragon Age II chronicles Hawke's rise from an impoverished refugee of the Blight to become the Champion of the city-state of Kirkwall in the Free Marches. The plot of Dragon Age II is a character-driven narrative which is more concerned with examining the interior worlds of distinct personalities instead of an epic, save-the-world storyline seen in other RPG games, and unfolds within a smaller chunk of the world of Thedas compared to the Warden's story in Origins.

Although Dragon Age II was affected by the game's compressed development schedule, the game's companion cast has received an overall favourable reception, with retrospective coverage discussing the game's greater emphasis on a smaller cast and a more character-driven story compared to Origins,

== Concept and creation ==
Former BioWare producer Mark Darrah characterized Dragon Age II as a game whose strengths lay in its character building, serialized structure, and depiction of Kirkwall over a decade rather than in a conventional world-saving plot. Charlotte Reber, author of Boss Fight Books' volume on Dragon Age II, described the game as unusually dependent on its character writing. She noted that its appeal comes from its player character Hawke, its narrator Varric Tethras, and the rest of the companion cast rather than from an epic fantasy plot.

Dragon Age II implements a friendship-rivalry continuum for Hawke's relationships with his or her companions, which can be described as a system of evaluative continua by which Hawke's actions are assessed. These continua are specific to each companion, and often contradicts those of other companions, requiring the player to make gameplay decisions that may have the potential to cause conflicting and sometimes severe consequences. Unlike the approval-disapproval meters for companions in Origins, incurring rivalry points with a companion does not lead to the character leaving the party or turning on Hawke, although it is still possible for companions to leave the party as a result of certain decisions made by the player character throughout the game's narrative. A companion who is on a rivalry path with Hawke gets unique gameplay bonuses that cannot be obtained if they are on a friendship path, and vice versa. Former Dragon Age lead writer David Gaider explained that the friendship-rivalry meter is expressive, not something that a player needs to fill up in order to be playing the game correctly. Gaider later explained that the game's companions were intended to provoke strong reactions from players, because the writing team wanted each companion's worldview to be internally justifiable rather than neutral or broadly agreeable.

Dragon Age II uses an updated version of Origins' Eclipse engine, internally called the "Lycium engine", with some graphical improvements. The artstyle was intended to be more distinct and "stylized yet still realistic". Dragon Age II has improved "facial topology" in order to make emoting more expressive, improved facial texture density, and a more realistic eye shader. The compression settings for textures were also altered, allowing for "higher visual quality per asset". ZBrush was used for characters in Dragon Age II, and proved useful in creating head variations. Every character head in Dragon Age II is based from a single mesh with a morph applied, which allowed the mesh to be "stretched and pulled" in different ways to create a unique character.

With the exception of Sebastian Vael, who is the sole heterosexual love interest, all other potential love interests in Dragon Age II are bisexual and available for either a male or female Hawke. Gaider admitted that making a romance available for both genders is far less costly than creating an entirely new one.

=== Cut character concepts ===
In a 2021 interview with Kotaku, lead writer David Gaider said that a hypothetical revised version of Dragon Age II would restore contextual dialogue in which non-player characters remembered whether they had previously met Hawke, whether Hawke was a mage, or whether they had interacted with a player character in Dragon Age: Origins. He also identified a cut storyline in which a mage Hawke would nearly become possessed while trapped inside their own mind, a plot he regretted losing because Hawke is otherwise unusual among mages in the series for never having to confront possession directly. Gaider further said that he would have liked an expanded opening that gave players more time with the siblings of their player character, Bethany and Carver, before the Darkspawn attack, a romance path with Varric, and a final option allowing Hawke to side with neither the mages nor the templars.

In a 2026 interview with TheGamer, Gaider revealed that BioWare had initially considered bringing multiple companions forward from Dragon Age: Origins – Awakening, including Anders, Justice, and Velanna. According to Gaider, Anders was not originally conceived as Justice's host; the idea that Anders would carry Justice, whose nature had changed into Vengeance, emerged later in development. Velanna was also considered, but Gaider said she was cut because the team felt players had been too ambivalent toward her in Awakening. Gaider recalled that Velanna would more likely have occupied the role that was ultimately filled by Merrill, rather than competing with Anders for the Justice storyline.

== Hawke ==
Voiced by: Nicholas Boulton (Male) and Jo Wyatt (Female)

Hawke is the family name of the main protagonist of Dragon Age II. Hawke's father Malcolm was an apostate mage who died three years before the beginning of the game, while their mother Leandra is a former noblewoman from Kirkwall. Hawke has two younger twin siblings, Carver and Bethany, who are mutually exclusive potential companions in Dragon Age. The Hawke family and Aveline Vallen were rescued from the Darkspawn hordes by Flemeth, who helped them to arrange for travel to Kirkwall; in return, Hawke has to travel to Sundermount at some point in time to deliver an amulet to Marethari of the Sabrae clan. In Kirwall, players experience Hawke's relationships with their mother, siblings, lovers and other characters develop over the length of a decade.

== Companions ==
=== Varric Tethras ===
Voiced by: Brian Bloom

Varric is a surface dwarf, a member of Dwarven merchant's guild and a known associate of Hawke. The video game's introduction shows him captured and interrogated by Cassandra Pentaghast, a Seeker of the Chantry; thus Varric becomes the narrator of the Dragon Age II story. Varric first meets Hawke roughly a year after the Hawke family has arrived in Kirkwall and makes them a partner in an expedition into the perilous region of The Deep Roads. They remain close friends or frenemies until the end of the game, when they are inevitably separated.

Varric wields Bianca, a unique repeating crossbow. He likes storytelling, and often takes liberties from factual accuracy to make his stories more detailed.

=== Bethany Hawke ===
Voiced by: Rebekah Staton

Bethany is a mage and one of the Hawke twins. She fled Lothering to escape the Blight with his family, and travels arrives to Kirkwall, where the City Guard is denying access to all Fereldan refugees.

If Hawke is a mage, instead of Carver, Bethany will die protecting their mother from an Ogre as they flee the Darkspawn onslaught of Lothering. If Bethany survives and is taken to the Deep Roads, she dies from contracting the Taint unless Anders is also in the party. To save Bethany's life, Anders will implore Hawke to search for a nearby group of Grey Wardens and persuades their leader, Stroud, to recruit her into the Grey Wardens. If left behind, Bethany is captured and forced into the Kirkwall Circle of Magi, though she will excel in her position as a Circle Mage. In either case, Bethany will not be available until the end of the game or during certain DLCs.

Bethany employs magic in combat. Her specialty is Force Magic which involves the use of telekinesis to hurl, knock down, stun and harm enemies.

=== Carver Hawke ===
Voiced by: Nico Lennon

Carver is the elder of the Hawke twins and a warrior. Carver tends to have an antagonistic relationship with his elder sibling, due to their having taken over their father's role as head of the household after his death, and possibly due to Carver being the only non-magical child in the family. He fled Lothering to escape the Blight with his family, and travels to Kirkwall, where the City Guard is denying access to all Fereldan refugees.

If Hawke is a rogue or warrior, instead of Bethany, Carver will die protecting their mother from an Ogre as they flee the Darkspawn onslaught of Lothering. If Carver survives and is taken to the Deep Roads expedition, he will contract the Taint and die unless Anders is also in the party. To save Carver's life, Anders will implore Hawke to search for a nearby group of Grey Wardens and persuades their leader, Stroud, to recruit him into the Grey Wardens. If he is left behind, he joins Kirkwall's Templar Order and remains resentful of his elder sibling. In either case, Carver will not be available until the end of the game or during certain DLC campaigns. Carver favours wielding two-handed weapons, and has access to the anti-magic combat specialization of the Templars, allowing him to prevent enemies from using special techniques.

=== Aveline Vallen ===
Voiced by: Joanna Roth

Aveline is the daughter of an exiled chevalier from Orlais who was born in Fereldan and served in the army of King Cailan before his death. She and her Templar husband Wesley meet the Hawkes on their flight from Lothering; Wesley dies during their escape in a mercy killing by either Hawke or Aveline to stop the Darkspawn taint from turning him into a ghoul. Aveline joins the Hawkes in escaping to Kirkwall, where she eventually becomes a member of city guard. She is later promoted to the Captain of the Guard after exposing the former Captain's corruption. During the course of the game, she falls in love with Donnic, a guardsman under her command, and can marry him with Hawke's encouragement. Donnic may appear as an ally in the final battle against Meredith, if Aveline is in the active party and if they are married. Aveline adopts her husband's shield during the Prologue and remains such throughout the game. Her specialization is Guardian, serving as a tank, attracting and absorbing hostile fire.

Aveline is a companion with whom Hawke cannot initiate a romance. Gaider explained that he likes characters "that play against type, and Aveline was a female character who was strong and independent yet also vulnerable, and at the same time she didn’t exist simply to be romanced".

Aveline was very well received by multiple commentators. Cory Banks from PC Gamer named her as his favourite companion, as did Hayley Williams from Kotaku. Kris Ligman from PopMatters was amused by her adversarial relationship with Isabela, calling it part of an evolving rapport between two well-written female characters. Aveline's voice actress, Joanna Roth has received praise for her performance.

=== Anders ===
Voiced by: Adam Howden

A former Grey Warden, Anders left the Order prior to the events of Dragon Age II, and agreed to host the spirit of Justice to help mages fight for freedom from the Chantry. Hawke first meets Anders at his clinic in Kirkwall's Darktown. He convinces Hawke to help rescue his friend Karl from the templars in return for maps of the Deep Roads, but finds that he has been rendered Tranquil, effectively a form of lobotomy which renders the victim unable to feel any emotions. It is then revealed that the spirit of Justice now manifests itself as a spirit of Vengeance, an unintentional side effect of Anders' anger and hatred towards the templars. As a result, Anders struggles to maintain control of his own body and mind, and is eventually driven to become a terrorist in the name of mage rights. During the climax of Act III, Anders destroys the Kirkwall Chantry, killing the Grand Cleric and several others. Hawke has the option of personally executing Anders for his crime, banishing him, or ordering him to fight and make amends. Each companion will react to how Hawke chooses to deal with Anders in their own way, positive or negative. The spirit's final fate is unknown should Hawke choose to execute Anders during the climax of Act III.

In Dragon Age II, Anders gains the ability channels the power of Vengeance to boost his own destructive power.

=== Merrill ===
Voiced by: Eve Myles

Merrill is the "First", or apprentice, to the Keeper of the Dalish Sabrae clan, Marethari. She first appears in the Dalish Elf origin story in Dragon Age: Origins, at a time when her clan was traveling through Ferelden. She joins the Dalish player character's party as a temporary companion. Shortly after Duncan recruits the Dalish player character, Merrill and her clan traveled north of Ferelden to escape the Blight and settled at Sundermount, a mountain peak to the north of Kirkwall.

In Dragon Age II, Merrill is a potential love interest for Hawke and joins the party when Marethari, whom Hawke was dealing with due to a debt owed to Flemeth, requests that Hawke escort her to Kirkwall. Merrill's obsession with restoring an ancient magical mirror known as an Eluvian, believing it to be an artifact which could help the Dalish regains their lost history and culture, and her use of blood magic to do so have caused a rift between her and her clan, resulting in her desire to leave. Ignorant of the world beyond her rich knowledge and expertise of Dalish history and magic, Merrill's personal quest involve her asking Hawke for favours to assist her with restoring the Eluvian.

Merrill uses magic in combat, and her specialization is "Dalish Pariah", a combination of nature magic and blood magic.

=== Isabela ===
Voiced by: Victoria Kruger

Isabela is the former captain of the pirate ship The Siren's Call, who is stranded in Kirkwall after being shipwrecked. She is an optional companion and potential love interest in Dragon Age II. It is later revealed that Isabela is the main reason behind the Qunari's presence in Kirkwall, as she had stolen an important artifact known as the Tome of Koslun. Depending on the player's choices, she may return to Hawke's side and hand the artifact back to the Arishok, supreme leader of the Qunari army. The Arishok will then demand that she be taken prisoner back to their homeland Par Vollen. Hawke can either hand Isabela over to him, duel the Arishok in single combat, or engage the entire Qunari force in combat.

Isabela's specialization is Swashbuckler, which improves her defensive abilities as well as effectiveness as an occasional tank.

=== Fenris ===
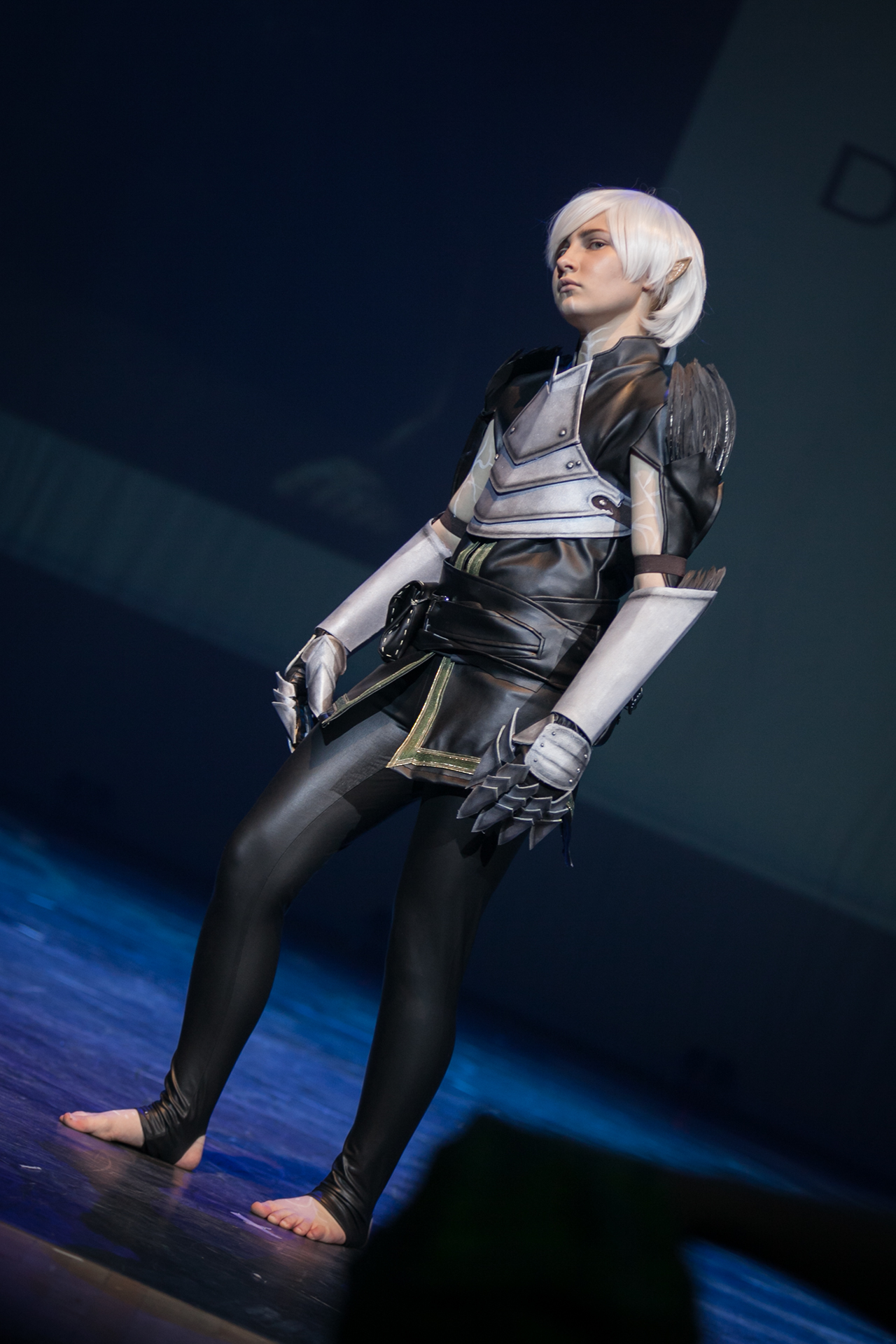
Cosplay of Fenris

Voiced by: Gideon Emery

Fenris is a Tevinter city elf and former slave; he is an optional companion and potential love interest. He lost his memory due to lyrium, a hazardous liquid substance with magical properties, being infused into his flesh, rendering him averse to physical contact but also giving him superhuman combat abilities. He escaped his master, a Tevinter magister named Danarius, and has been hunted by him ever since. Fenris is a brooding pessimist who is unable or unwilling to live a happy life; he has no memory of his past name, and resents mages due to the suffering he endured under Danarius. Over the course of Dragon Age II, he lives alone in an abandoned dilapidated mansion whose roof is in tatters and its floor strewn with corpses. His personal quest involves reconnecting with his sister Varania, and dealing with his former master's pursuit.

Fenris employs two-handed melee weapons in combat. His specialization, Tevinter Fugitive, involves channeling the power of the imbued lyrium in his body to improve combat efficiency, allowing Fenris to move faster and do more damage as he gets hurt.

Fenris appears as a major character in Dragon Age: Blue Wraith, a three-part limited comic series published by Dark Horse Comics in 2020.

=== Sebastian Vael ===
Voiced by: Alec Newman

Sebastian Vael is an optional companion introduced in Dragon Age II via the DLC pack, The Exiled Prince. An archer of noble birth, Sebastian was a cloistered brother of the Kirkwall Chantry until his family was murdered. Depending the player's choices throughout the three acts, Sebastian may remain as a Chantry brother or renounce his vows to attend political concerns. Sebastian is a romantic interest for a female Hawke only, but the relationship is chaste due to his vows to the Chantry. Following the destruction of the Kirkwall Chantry by Anders in Act III, Sebastian insists that Anders has committed mass murder and must be executed. If Hawke spares Anders, an enraged Sebastian leaves the party in protest, promising vengeance. If Hawke acquiesces, Sebastian stays as a party member. Sebastian uses bow and arrows as weapon. His specialization, Royal Archer, increases his combat effectiveness in one-on-one fights.

Sebastian appears as a supporting character in Dragon Age: Knight Errant, a five-part limited comic series published by Dark Horse Comics in 2017.

=== Tallis ===
Voiced by: Felicia Day

Tallis is a temporary companion in the Dragon Age II DLC, Mark of the Assassin. She was an elven slave in the Tevinter Imperium until the Qunari liberated her and she converted to the Qun, where she was given several names before being assigned to the Ben-Hassrath as Tallis (Qunlat for "To Solve"). Tallis is a rogue character and uses daggers in combat. Unlike Isabela, Tallis also employs unique throwing knives for ranged attacks. Her combat specialty called Infiltrator allows her to win close quarter encounters with a single foe. Tallis only appears in main campaign of Mark of the Assassin DLC pack as a mandatory party member, and she leaves Hawke's party permanently after the DLC pack is completed.

Tallis is voiced by and modeled after Felicia Day, who also stars as Tallis in the webseries Dragon Age: Redemption, a six-part webseries.

== Antagonists ==
=== Bartrand Tethras ===
Voiced by: Keith Szarabajka

Bartrand Tethras is Varric's elder brother, a merchant prince who organizes an expedition into the Deep Roads in Act I of Dragon Age II. He later betrays Varric and Hawke, abandoning them to their fates in the Deep Roads while he escapes to the surface. He is later driven insane by the red lyrium idol he recovered from the Deep Roads.

=== The Arishok ===
Voiced by: Rick D. Wasserman

The Arishok is the leader of the Qunari military branch, who is stranded in Kirkwall with his men, after their ship was wrecked in a storm chasing after the thief who stole their relic. Despite the Qunari's history as foreign occupiers, he states he has a demand to satisfy of their religion, the Qun and claims he has no intention of conquering Kirkwall. He is eventually sickened by the people who inhabit Kirkwall and after tensions between the Qunari and the residents of Kirkwall boil over, he decides to take the city by force and beheads its Viscount. Hawke must deal with the Arishok, and earns the title of Champion of Kirkwall after resolving the Qunari crisis on behalf of the embattled city state.

The Arishok's visual design was the favourite of the character artist team; team member Jae Keum was credited for designing the Qunari and their leader in such a way which captures the intensity of their stare as well as their essence as stern and noble warriors.

=== Petrice ===
Voiced by: Christine Roberts

Petrice is a Chantry Sister who ascends to the title of Mother by Act II of Dragon Age II. A religious extremist, she attempts to drive the Qunari out of Kirkwall by any necessary means; her schemes include setting Hawke up with a Qunari Saarebas mage named Ketojan, and murdering the Viscount's son Saemus Dumar who had converted to the Qun.

=== First Enchanter Orsino ===
Voiced by: Jim Ward

Orsino is the First Enchanter of the Circle of Magi in Kirkwall. He constantly clashes with Meredith over her treatment of mages and growing power in the city. Their most consistent topic of unrest is the thought that the mages use blood magic in secret. After Meredith invokes the Rite of Annulment, Orsino admits that he had ties to the deranged necromancer Quentin, who murdered Hawke's mother and several other women in Kirkwall. In desperation from the advancing Templars, he uses blood magic to use the dead bodies surrounded him to transform into a monstrous Harvester. He must be fought and killed by Hawke, regardless of which faction Hawke sides with.

Reflecting on Orsino's role in the narrative of Dragon Age II, Gaider felt that it was a lost opportunity as Orsino ended up getting less screen time than necessary for his side of the story to be properly told.

=== Knight-Commander Meredith Stannard ===
Voiced by: Jean Gilpin

Meredith is the Knight-Commander of the Templar Order in Kirkwall and the chief antagonist of Dragon Age II. She holds extremist views on the control of magic, and is the ruler of Kirkwall in all but name; the Viscount of Kirkwall, Marlowe Dumar, dare not oppose her. Following Dumar's death, Meredith assumes direct control over the city, and prevents any vote to elect a new Viscount to proceed. Kirkwall quickly becomes a police state that Meredith rules with an iron fist, giving free rein to her cronies amongst the Order to do as they please in abusing the mages and dominating the civilian population of the city. As the game progresses, she suffers from paranoid delusions that all members of the Circle of Magi are blood mages and all who defy her are under their influence. During the climax of the game, Anders blows up the Kirkwall Chantry and openly announces his culpability. The destruction of the Chantry gave her the opportunity to unilaterally invoke the Rite of Annulment, an order to kill every member of the Kirkwall's Circle of Magi, without official sanction from a Grand Cleric or the Divine. Her action sparked the Kirkwall Rebellion, which eventually escalates into a regional war between the Templar Order and the Circle mages. Meredith later reveals that she has purchased an idol made of red lyrium previously recovered by Hawke and Varric in the Deep Roads in Act I, which was taken by Varric's brother, Bartrand. The red lyrium has granted her superhuman abilities, but has also caused her insanity, as it did to Bartrand. Hawke is forced to fight Meredith as the game's final boss and kill her.

=== Corypheus ===
Voiced by: David Sterne

Corypheus is the main antagonist of the Dragon Age II DLC pack Legacy. Corypheus is one of the original Magisters Sidereal: magic-wielding magisters from the Tevinter Imperium in ancient times, who broke into the Maker's Golden City centuries ago to claim it for their own selfish, power-hungry reasons. The Andrastrian Chantry teaches that the magisters' actions and hubris turned the city black and transformed them into the first Darkspawn. Corypheus, also known as The Conductor of the Choir of Silence, is mentioned in the Chantry's Chant of Light as collaborating with the high priest of Urthemiel, known as the Architect of the Works of Beauty. In Legacy, Corypheus is released from a prison deep within the Vimmark Mountains and seemingly killed by Hawke; unbeknownst to Hawke, his soul transferred to a nearby Grey Warden, who then take their leave. Corypheus would return as the central antagonist of Dragon Age: Inquisition.

=== Duke Prosper de Monfort ===
Voiced by: Philippe Smolikowski

Duke Prosper de Monfort is the main antagonist of the Dragon Age II DLC pack Mark of the Assassin. He is a high-ranking Orlesian nobleman, and a cousin of Empress Celene I's mother. Tallis enlists Hawke's aid to infiltrate Duke Prosper's home, the Château Haine, and steal the "Heart of the Many", a gem which he supposedly has no right to possess. Upon his death at the conclusion of the DLC pack, his son Cyril de Montfort inherits his holdings and titles.

== Supporting characters ==
=== Cassandra Pentaghast ===
Voiced by: Miranda Raison

Cassandra Pentaghast is a member of the Seekers of Truth, a secretive and powerful faction within the Andrastian Chantry answering directly to the Divine in Val Royeaux. She kidnaps Varric to extract information regarding Hawke. Varric responds by spinning a tale about Hawke's life story, framing the narrative for the events of Dragon Age II.

=== Leandra Amell ===
Voiced by: Deborah Moore

Leandra Amell is the mother of Hawke, Bethany, and Carver. She was a noblewoman from a prominent family in Kirkwall. She is the widow of Malcolm Hawke, a mage who was originally from the Kirkwall Circle of Magi; they first met at a ball thrown in honour of the visiting Grand Duchess Florianne de Chalons by then-Viscount of Kirkwall Perrin Threnhold. She defied her family by eloping with Malcolm; the couple fled to his native Ferelden, where they settled down in Lothering and started a family together. Shortly after the Battle of Ostagar, Leandra escapes with her family from Lothering's destruction, where they had lived for several years, fleeing with portions of the Darkspawn horde in pursuit. Leandra suggests travelling to Kirkwall and seek her younger brother Gamlen's aid to enter the city. During their flight through the Blightlands, one of the twins is killed by an Ogre. Leandra and her surviving children, along with Aveline Vallen, travel to Gwaren with the aid of Flemeth, and from there they take a ship to Kirkwall. She reunites with Gamlen, who reveals that he lost the estate some years earlier. In order to get his relatives in, Gamlen commits Hawke and their sibling to work with either a mercenary company or a smuggling group for a year, during which time the Hawke family live at Gamlen's hovel in Lowtown. Upon Hawke's profitable return from the Deep Roads expedition at the conclusion of Act I, the family regains control of the old Amell estate from the slavers. When Hawke investigates the mystery of missing women in Act II, Leandra is abducted and murdered by an insane serial killer while en route to visit Gamlen, as her face resembles his deceased wife.

Leandra is included in a list of notable RPG mothers compiled by RPGFan; her abduction and death is noted as one of the more emotional scenes in Dragon Age II as she had been a constant presence at Hawke's side.

=== Flemeth ===
Voiced by: Kate Mulgrew

Flemeth is the legendary "Witch of the Wilds", an ancient, transcendent and apparently immortal shape-shifting mage affecting the appearance of an eccentric old woman or a high dragon depending on the situation. Flemeth appears at the beginning of Dragon Age II to save Hawke and their party from Darkspawn while sporting a new, more menacing look. Later in the game it is revealed that regardless of what happened in Dragon Age: Origins, she survived by putting a part of her soul in a medallion that she then gave to Hawke in exchange for safe passage to Kirkwall. The Dalish elves living near Kirkwall then use the amulet to restore her. She warns Hawke and company that the world is about to change before departing.

=== Gamlen Amell ===
Voiced by: Timothy Watson

Gamlen Amell is Leandra Amell's brother and the last lord of the Amell family. After gambling away the family fortune and losing the ancestral Amell estate, Gamlen relocated to the squalor of Lowtown. He is estranged from his daughter, Charade Amell, who is a member of the notorious Friends of Red Jenny.

=== Marethari ===
Voiced by: Kate Binchy

Marethari is the Keeper of the Dalish Sabrae clan, whose members include her First (apprentice) Merrill and potentially a Warden of Dalish elf origin. As a Keeper, she is the political and spiritual leader of her clan. The Keepers are also the mages of the Dalish, though each clan will seldom have more than two fully trained mages, namely the Keeper and the Keeper's First. In Origins, Marethari is preparing her clan to flee Ferelden, and venture north into the Free Marches, both in response to warnings from Duncan about the impending Blight and tensions with a neighboring human settlement.

The clan occupies Sundermount, a mountain peak to the north of Kirkwall by the events of Dragon Age II. Hawke delivers an amulet on Flemeth's behest to Marethari, and the latter will ask Hawke to perform a ritual involving Merrill as well. The ritual involved summoning and/or reviving Flemeth, in the event that she meets her death at the hands of the Warden. After the ritual is done, Marethari asks Hawke to take Merrill back to Kirkwall but does not specify why. It is later revealed that Marethari sent Merrill away because the latter had been insistent on trying to repair the elven artifact which sickened two members of the Sabrae clan. But since the fragment she kept contained the Darkspawn taint, Merrill learned blood magic from a demon imprisoned at the top of Sundermount, in order to purify it. Marethari would continue to discourage Merrill from her attempts to fix the artifact due to the potential danger.

=== Cullen ===
Voiced by: Greg Ellis

Cullen is the Knight-Captain and second-in-command to Knight-Commander Meredith by the events of Dragon Age II, after he was transferred from the Ferelden Circle and received a promotion. While he is traumatized by his experiences from Origins, he is presented as a tough but fair arbiter of his duties as a templar. He eventually encounters and becomes a recurring associate of Hawke, the Champion of Kirkwall. During the final confrontation with Meredith, Cullen orders her to step down when she orders Hawke to be executed, stating that they had agreed only to arrest the Champion. Meredith will accuse him and the rest of the templars of being blood mage thralls and then attack. Cullen will fight alongside Hawke.

Other members of the Templar Order who showed dissent against Meredith's leadership of the Templar Order, openly or otherwise, includes Ser Thrask, a moderate member of the Templar Order who believes that mages and templars can co-exist in harmony, and Raleigh Samson, a former templar turned beggar who is caught up in a conspiracy to oust Meredith from her position as Knight-Commander of the Kirkwall Templar Order. Depending on player choices, Samson may be reinstated as a templar and aids Hawke in the final battle against Meredith.

=== Bodahn and Sandal Feddic ===
Voiced by: Dwight Schultz and Yuri Lowenthal

Bodahn Feddic is a surface dwarf merchant, who is assisted by his adopted son, Sandal. In Dragon Age II Bodahn and Sandal journey to Kirkwall in the aftermath of the Fifth Blight, providing provisions for the Deep Roads expedition organised by House Tethras. He proudly boasts about his association with the Warden to Hawke, who had managed to become business partner to Bartrand and Varric. During the expedition, Bodahn alerts Hawke that Sandal has gone missing. Whether or not Hawke agrees to look for him, Bodahn is extremely grateful when Sandal returns to him unharmed. After the Deep Roads expedition, he sets up in the Amell Estate as servants in the Amell estate in Hightown along with Bodahn, who can craft any rune Hawke requires. Sandal also occasionally takes on cooking duties for the estate, his specialty being "Enchantment Soup". By Act 3, due to the rising tensions between templars and mages, Bodahn decided that it would be time that he and Sandal leave Kirkwall. He mentions that the Orlesian Empress is very interested in Sandal's enchantments and would like an audience with him.

=== Grand Cleric Elthina ===
Voiced by: Rachel Atkins

Elthina is the Grand Cleric of Kirkwall in the Free Marches, and is one of the city state's most powerful people. As the Grand Cleric, she tried and imprisoned Marlowe Dumar's predecessor who attempted to expel the Templar Order from Kirkwall, and indirectly undermined the political office of Viscount by allowing Kirkwall's Templar Order under Knight Commander Meredith Stannard to grow too powerful. She personally appointed Meredith to the position of the Knight-Commander of Kirkwall, and Sister Petrice to the rank of Mother in the Kirkwall Chantry. She refuses to openly take sides in the conflict between Meredith and First Enchanter Orsino of the Kirkwall Circle of Magi, claiming that she is seeking to balance the needs of everyone. By the climax of Act III, Anders blows up the Kirkwall Chantry, killing Elthina and everybody else inside. Meredith unilaterally invokes and executes the Rite of Annulment in response, sparking the Kirkwall Rebellion.

=== Viscount Marlowe Dumar ===
Voiced by: Christopher Godwin

Marlowe Dumar is the Viscount of Kirkwall, officially the most powerful political office in the city-state, though in practice Dumar holds power only at the sufferance of Kirkwall's Templar Order, despite his efforts to gain more relevance amongst Kirkwall's nobility. During his reign as viscount, the Templar Order has grown extremely powerful in Kirkwall: it has become the center of Chantry strength in eastern Thedas and holds its Circle of Magi in an iron grip. He is assisted by Seneschal Bran, who advises Dumar and is responsible for managing Kirkwall's bureaucratic establishment.

During Hawke's first year in Kirkwall, Dumar put out a bounty for the safe return of his son, Saemus. He was under the impression that Saemus was kidnapped by the Qunari. When it turned out that Saemus befriended the Qunari, Dumar was concerned how scandalous it would be if it was found out that a Qunari influenced his family. Three years later, Dumar summoned Hawke to help with the matter of the Qunari. However, events culminated with the death of Saemus, who was murdered by Chantry fanatics desperate to set the whole city against the Qunari. By this point, Dumar grieves for his son and no longer has the resolve to lead his city. Dumar was later killed by the Arishok during the Qunari attack on Kirkwall and his head was tossed about his own throne room. After his death, Knight Commander Meredith tightened her stranglehold on the city, and deliberately leaves the position of Viscount vacant. Following Dumar's death, Bran becomes the de facto administrator of Kirkwall and was eventually elected Provisional Viscount, while Meredith took up stewardship of the city-state.
