= Dragon Age: Origins downloadable content =

Additional gameplay for 2009 video game

Downloadable content for Dragon Age: Origins, a role-playing game developed by BioWare and published by Electronic Arts, was announced prior to the game's release in late 2009 along with a commitment from BioWare to support two years of content. Up to seven major content packs were released: The Stone Prisoner, Warden's Keep, Return to Ostagar, The Darkspawn Chronicles, Leliana's Song, The Golems of Amgarrak, and Witch Hunt. The downloadable content (DLC) packs were distributed via Xbox Live, PlayStation Network, and BioWare's website for the PC platform.

Both The Stone Prisoner and Warden's Keep were released on the launch date of the base game. The Stone Prisoner adds Shale as a fully voice acted companion character, along with a new location, items and quests. Warden's Keep adds the fortress of Soldier's Peak as a potential base of operations for the player, and explores the history behind the exile of the Grey Wardens from the kingdom of Ferelden generations ago. Return to Ostagar, released on various platforms between January and March 2010, features a return to the ruined fortress of Ostagar to recover the personal effects of the recently deceased king of Ferelden. The Darkspawn Chronicles, released on May 18, 2010, explores an alternate "what-if" scenario to the base game's narrative where Ferelden falls to the monstrous Darkspawn hordes. Leliana's Song, released on July 6, 2010, explores the backstory of Leliana, a companion character from the base game. The Golems of Amgarrak, released on August 10, 2010, follows the investigation of a missing dwarven expedition in search for the lost secret behind the construction of golems within the subterranean network of the Deep Roads. Witch Hunt, released on September 7, 2010, provides some closure to the storyline of the witch Morrigan, another companion character from the base game. All download packs offered unlocks of achievements and rewards upon their completion.

A version containing the aforementioned DLC along with Origins and its expansion pack Dragon Age: Origins - Awakening, Dragon Age: Origins - Ultimate Edition, was released on October 27, 2010. Many smaller content items in Origins were given away for promotional purposes as pre-order bonuses, platform exclusives and as rewards from special events.

== The Stone Prisoner ==
The Stone Prisoner, released on November 3, 2009, adds the golem Shale, voiced by Geraldine Blecker, as a recruitable companion character to the game. The Stone Prisoner was intended to be complimentary for players who purchase a new copy of any edition of Origins, though it is available as a standalone purchase.

To access its contents, players must interact with a merchant who offers a control rod for a rogue golem, which is found as a solitary statue in the middle of a village which have been overrun with Darkspawn. To recruit Shale, players will need to assist the surviving villagers against the Darkspawn, solve a tile-puzzle, and deal with the level's main antagonist, a demon-possessed cat. Like other companion characters, Shale is a fully voice-acted character with unique interactions, an approval rating system, and a personal quest that ties in with the main plot. As a golem, Shale has a distinct set of abilities as well as a unique customization system with attendant loot drops added across the game.

Originally planned for the base game, Shale was initially cut due to technical constraints of the game engine, as her character model was too large to fit into doorways, and the camera would not display the character properly when the team raised the conversation system as a lot of it was procedural in nature. When the release date of Origins was delayed from early 2009 to November 2009, the development team had the time and opportunity to rework Shale, along with her backstory and personal quest as launch day DLC for the base game. To resolve the technical issues surrounding Shale, the team reduced the size of her model, and as a result she is smaller compared to other golem characters in Origins.

=== Reception ===
Oli Welsh from Eurogamer praised The Stone Prisoner as an "amazingly well-integrated" DLC pack with the base game, with its location and scripting superior in quality to the base game's side quests. Welsh found that in this instance, the developer succeeded in creating DLC that can meaningfully enrich the entire game players buy it for. For Welsh, Shale's humorous edge and sarcasm helps balance the game's "stuffy tone".

== Warden's Keep ==
Warden's Keep, released on November 3, 2009, adds the fortress of Soldier's Peak to the game world and an associated quest which could be completed in under an hour. The pack adds a variety of equipment and weapons encountered in Soldier's Peak which are superior in quality to items that can be purchased, as well as powerful new abilities and spells for player characters who consume a specific potion in the keep. Following the completion of the quest, the player can set up a base of operations in Soldier's Peak with two merchants and an area to store the surplus equipment of party members.

The story of Warden's Keep explores why the Grey Wardens were exiled from Ferelden a few generations prior to their return on the invitation of King Maric as depicted in the 2009 novel Dragon Age: The Calling. To access its contents, the player must interact with the merchant Levi Dryden, whose grandmother Sophia Dryden was a Grey Warden commander who lost the order's base in Soldier's Peak over a dispute with a tyrannical ancestor of King Maric. His family disgraced as a result of her actions, Dryden asks the Wardens to reclaim the fortress and clear her name. In Soldier's Peak, the player's party encounter ghostly apparitions which recount past events from three decades ago and put the infestation of monsters within the keep in context. At the story's conclusion, players are presented with multiple options to deal with Sophia, who is now a demon-possessed version of her former self, and Avernus, a blood mage who devise new ways to counter the Darkspawn Blight through often unethical means.

=== Reception ===
Oli Welsh from Eurogamer found Warden's Keep to be "an encouraging start for Dragon Age DLC in quality terms - but not quantity", and while the pack represented the best of Dragon Age's combat and storytelling in a more compact form, its main quest is "an unsatisfying meal for the money" which is best played as early as possible for an optimal gameplay experience.

== Return to Ostagar ==
Return to Ostagar features a return to the ruined fortress of Ostagar, where the Grey Wardens were nearly wiped out by the Darkspawn invasion early in Origins. The player character is allowed the opportunity to further explore the backstory for King Cailan Theirin and Teryn Loghain Mac Tir, recover the arms and armor of the fallen king as well as the last Commander of the Grey, Duncan, and recruit a Mabari War Hound as a party member. Noted for its troubled release schedule, Return to Ostagar received mixed or average reviews following its release.

== The Darkspawn Chronicles ==
The Darkspawn Chronicles, released on May 18, 2010, is a standalone module which allows players to experience an alternate history scenario for the final battle at the Ferelden capital city of Denerim. In this version of the game's plot, the player's Grey Warden did not survive the Joining, and the Ferelden army is led by Alistair who rules as king. The player assumes the role of a hurlock vanguard, who is tasked by the Archdemon, the leader of the Darkspawn hordes, to capture the Ferelden capital city of Denerim and eliminate the remaining Grey Wardens. Players advance through straightforward combat encounters throughout the city's districts, and occasionally undertake quest objectives such as killing a fixed number of opponents, setting fire to landmarks, or sneaking a unit past an enemy checkpoint. Players have the ability to recruit other Darkspawn creatures by selecting and enthralling any allied units they encounter. Once a Darkspawn thrall is brought into the party and under the player's command, they will have the opportunity to improve the thrall's approving rating, which enhances their combat abilities and unlock status-boosting effects. Players may clear up a spot in the party at any time by targeting the desired thrall unit to be executed and discarded. Unlike the base game, playable characters do not gain experience or level up. Darkspawn Chronicles includes several achievements and trophies for players to unlock. One achievement will unlock a sword called Blightblood which could be transferred into the campaigns of the base game as well as Awakening.

Rob Bartel, lead designer of Darkspawn Chronicles, described it as "a story of loss and of absence" which turns "history on its head". He believed that putting the player into the role of a Darkspawn unit and showing the capture and fall of Denerim from the Darkspawn's perspective is "an interesting thread that players would want to experience". Bartel positioned the Darkspawn Chronicles as a powerful visceral experience which is light on dialogue and predominantly revolves around its distinct combat mechanics.

=== Reception ===
The Darkspawn Chronicles

Aggregate score
Aggregator	Score
Metacritic	PC: 66/100; X360: 56/100

Review scores
Publication	Score
Eurogamer	4/10
IGN	6.5/10
Eurogamer Italy	5/10
Pelit (Finland)	6.5/10

According to the review aggregator Metacritic, the Microsoft Windows and Xbox 360 versions of The Darkspawn Chronicles received "mixed or average reviews" from video game publications.

Charles Onyett from IGN assessed The Darkspawn Chronicles with a passable rating, citing a lack of satisfaction in spite of its novel concept and inexpensive pricing. While he liked the idea of roleplaying as the villain, in particular an Ogre or a Shriek who massacre familiar characters from the main Origins story, he found the overall experience too straightforward to be especially memorable, and cited its "short length, lack of customization options, and absence of any real character interaction" as the pack's major weaknesses.

Dan Whitehead from Eurogamer gave a negative review and found the overall experience to be disappointing. To Whitehead, the title of The Darkspawn Chronicles is a misnomer, as it "offers the bare minimum of gaming" which lasts for about an hour as opposed to an epic, ongoing saga its name might suggest. Whitehead concurred that the idea of a "Dragon Age monster squad is appealing" on a conceptual level as the initial stages of the DLC was competently executed as a "bloodthirsty evil simulator". However, he criticized the pack's later stages as a "deathly grind" which lacked meaningful dialogue, character interaction and room for sophisticated combat tactics, elements which he considered were the base game's best aspects and which he had expected from a "narrative powerhouse like BioWare". Other criticisms included the story's thoughtless treatment of familiar characters, as well as numerous technical glitches and bugs which Whitehead considered to be unforgivable as the pack clearly recycled existing assets from the base game which had been updated by multiple patches.

== Leliana's Song ==
Leliana's Song, released on July 6, 2010, is a standalone module set several years before the events of the base game. Players assume the role of Leliana when she was an agent working for the Orlesian bard Marjolaine, and experience the events that led her to settle down in Ferelden and join the Chantry. Leliana is joined by three companions for the module: Sketch, an apostate city elven mage; Tug, a surface dwarven warrior; and Silas Corthwaite, A Ferelden warrior. All playable characters may gain experience, level up, and are customizable to a degree. The pack adds a set of armor called Battledress of the Provocateur which could be transferred into Origins and Awakening campaigns upon completion of the DLC.

French actress Corinne Kempa reprised her role as Leliana, which she described in a 2010 interview as her biggest role to date.

=== Reception ===
Leliana's Song

Aggregate score
Aggregator	Score
Metacritic	PC: 66/100; PS3: 67/100

Review scores
Publication	Score
GameSpot	7/10
IGN	7/10
Play	6/10

According to the review aggregator Metacritic, the Microsoft Windows and PlayStation 3 versions of Leliana's Song received "mixed or average reviews" from video game publications.

Both Charles Onyett from IGN and Kevin VanOrd from GameSpot recommended Leliana's Song for players who wanted more of the base game's experience or fans of the Leliana character. Onyett felt that while Leliana is not a particularly compelling character, Leliana's Song is a "decent" content pack and a "solid addition" to the series: short in length but filled with plot twists, fully voiced cut scenes and interesting conversations. VanOrd felt that while overall the pack offered nothing extraordinary, particularly with its combat sequences and the fact that the party is capped at three instead of the usual four in the base game, the well-written dynamic between Leliana and Marjolaine and as well as quality story moments were worthy of praise. VanOrd liked the voice acting and the effective storytelling which frames Leliana's origin story from a darker perspective, though her companions are duller by comparison. VanOrd also praised the new music for the pack, highlighting the "crooked tunes" heard during the first hour which is appropriate for the "gleeful malevolence" of Marjolaine's games of political intrigue, and the emotional resonance invoked by the somber music which accompanies multiple scenes later in the story.

Former creative director Mike Laidlaw noted that player feedback for Leliana's Song, while mostly positive, often focused on how disconnected players felt from its narrative structures as it did not feature their player character Warden from the base game.

== The Golems of Amgarrak ==
The Golems of Amgarrak, released on August 10, 2010, follows the player's Warden-Commander on a campaign in the Deep Roads to investigate the fate of a missing dwarven expedition. The Warden-Commander, who is either an existing character imported from Origins or Awakening or a newly created character, is recruited by a dwarven ranger named Jerrik Dace in search for his brother Brogan Dace, who was a member of the aforementioned expedition. The player learns that the expedition was searching of the lost secret behind the construction of golems, especially new techniques to modify old golems in an effort to make a new generation of golems, with rumors leading to the lost Halls of Amgarrak.

The Golems of Amgarrak is noted for its high level of game difficulty. While the player may recruit a golem with healing abilities, the composition of available party companions lack magic-using support character types. A noteworthy sequence involve a puzzle section deep in the caverns, which is resolved by throwing switches to change the color of gas vapours to enable access to different rooms with more switches, culminating in a difficult final boss fight against a grotesque creature called the Harvester. The pack also allows players to claim rewards, and unlock achievements which grant multiple special items that can be transferred into the campaigns of the base game as well as Awakening.

BioWare's Ferret Baudoin explained in an interview that combat in The Golems of Amgarrak is very challenging as golems make for tough opponents, although he also described Jerrik and his bronto (a rhino-like beast) mount Snug as powerful supporting companions in difficult fights. Baudoin claimed that the hardest achievement for the DLC is a "real badge of honor". The Harvester reappears in Dragon Age II; according to Lead Character Artist for Dragon Age II Shawn Hawco, DLC modules like The Golems of Amgarrak served as a proving ground for the development team to not only "test the creative waters" but also provide players with a preview of BioWare's sequel plans.

=== Reception ===
The Golems of Amgarrak

Aggregate score
Aggregator	Score
Metacritic	PC: 57/100

Review scores
Publication	Score
Eurogamer	4/10
Eurogamer Italy	7/10

According to the review aggregator Metacritic, the Microsoft Windows version of The Golems of Amgarrak received "mixed or average reviews" from video game publications.

Dan Whitehead from Eurogamer said some players may be interested in the "ferocity" of the pack's challenging combat sequences, but otherwise labelled it as "another quest-by-numbers effort" with a narratively inert campaign. For Whitehead, the actual gameplay challenge is from the repetitive use of "cheap enemies" boosted with artificial resilience, which exposes one of the base game's weaknesses in its inherently unbalanced difficulty modes. Whitehead also criticized the new characters as bland and forgettable, and the story lacked depth. Conversely, the Italian edition of Eurogamer gave The Golems of Amgarrak a positive review, assessing it as a short but intense gaming experience.

Chris Thursten from PC Gamer suggested that The Golems of Amgarrak is a notable example of DLC which is not entirely made of filler material, but is certainly missable. He described the gameplay experience as "new healthbars to whittle and new gear to find with companions whose voices are notably absent", with a plotline that adds little of substance or consequence.

== Witch Hunt ==
Witch Hunt, released on September 7, 2010, follows the Warden-Commander's investigation into reports that Morrigan has returned to Ferelden sometime after her disappearance at the end of Origins. Similar to The Golems of Amgarrak, players may create a new Warden-Commander for the module, or import an existing character from Origins or Awakening. Witch Hunt is meant to provide closure to Morrigan's storyline from the base game, with rewards that transfer into Origins and Awakening.

In Witch Hunt, the Warden-Commander and their Mabari war hound companions encounters the Dalish elf warrior Ariane in the witch Flemeth's old residence in the Korcari Wilds while searching for Morrigan. Believing that Morrigan has stolen an ancient book from her tribe, Ariane and the Warden-Commander travel to the Ferelden Circle of Magi, where they learn that Morrigan is seeking a magic mirror artifact known as an Eluvian after investigating its library. Joined by an Elf mage named Finn, the group traveled to various locations to assemble a collection of artifacts, before traveling to the Dragonbone Wastes to fight a Strider, the pack's final boss which resembles a cross between a bat, a spider, and a tree branch. The player is then presented with multiple conversations options on how to deal with Morrigan upon meeting her, with the option to leave with her dependent on a prior decision imported from the base game.

Like the Harvester from The Golems of Amgarrak, the Strider (also known as a Stryder or Varterral) from Witch Hunt is repurposed for an appearance in Dragon Age II as an adversary.

=== Reception ===
Witch Hunt

Aggregate score
Aggregator	Score
Metacritic	PC: 56/100; PS3: 61/100; X360: 56/100

Review scores
Publication	Score
Eurogamer	6/10
GameSpot	5/10
IGN	6.5/10
Official Xbox Magazine (US)	5/10
PC PowerPlay	6/10
Eurogamer Italy	7/10

Witch Hunt received generally "mixed or average reviews" on all released platforms from video game publications.

Dan Whitehead from Eurogamer said Witch Hunt emulates the structure of a decent Dragon Age quest, though it fails to provide a compelling reason as to why the player character is determined to pursue Morrigan. Whitehead formed a view that Witch Hunt is satisfactory in terms of quality when compared to Return to Ostagar and The Darkspawn Chronicles, but he compared it unfavorably to the Lair of the Shadow Broker DLC for Mass Effect 2, which was released around the same time period. Kevin VanOrd said the story of Morrigan's return in Witch Hunt is a disappointing experience, as it had amounted to a cameo appearance which served as a mere plot device within a narrative that VanOrd called a "simple fetch quest" that is "explained with as little dialogue as possible". Both Whitehead and VanOrd thought the actual voice acting was competent, but were dismissive of the companion characters introduced in Witch Hunt as they were considered poor substitutes of the fully realized party members from the main campaign.

Charles Onyett from IGN gave Witch Hunt a "passable" rating, and was of the view that it is difficult to recommend unless the player is willing to spend money to reunite with Morrigan "for about five minutes and get an unsatisfactory explanation". On the other hand, Onyett found the characterization of Ariane and Finn to be quite strong based on their regular banter, and he considered the tale of how the player finds a "sparsely clothed mage" to be "a decent one filled with personality and humor". Onyett considered the pack's combat encounters to be short but fun, as the pack employs some interesting mechanics to keep the action from becoming stale.

== Ultimate Edition ==
Downloadable content for Dragon Age: Origins was announced in October 2009 before the game's release for Microsoft Windows, PlayStation 3, and Xbox 360 in November 2009, and for Mac OS X in December 2009. DLC content for Origins include additional characters, story missions, in-game items, and four standalone narrative modules. Although BioWare intended to support the game with downloadable content for at least two years, the final DLC for Origins, Witch Hunt, was released on September 7, 2010.

Announced for PC, PlayStation 3, and Xbox 360 in September 2010, Dragon Age: Origins - Ultimate Edition is a compilation which collects Dragon Age: Origins, its expansion Dragon Age: Origins - Awakening and seven of the DLC content packs listed in this article in a single release: The Stone Prisoner, Warden's Keep, Return to Ostagar, The Darkspawn Chronicles, Leliana's Song, The Golems of Amgarrak, and Witch Hunt. Ultimate Edition was released for all platforms on October 27, 2010. A PC version without digital rights management (DRM) was first released outside of EA's digital distribution platform Origin in July 2016.

Physical copies of the European release of Ultimate Edition's PlayStation 3 port were known for the erroneous omission of Return to Ostagar, which had to be downloaded from PlayStation Store using vouchers provided by EA customer service representatives. In April 2011, some players encountered issues with Bioware's DRM authorization servers, where they received error messages stating that the downloadable content bundled with Ultimate Edition were not registered as authorized when attempting to load a game save, leaving them unable to play the game.

== Other content ==
- A crossover promotion with Mass Effect 2, the Blood Dragon armor was available without extra cost to players who purchased a new copy of Dragon Age: Origins. In addition, unlocking the Blood Dragon armor set in Origins will unlock it for use in Mass Effect 2 and Dragon Age II.
- Feastday Gifts and Feastday Pranks, released on April 1, 2010, each include ten unique Feastday gift and prank items, one for each companion, as well as two generic items that can be given to any companion. Each item can be downloaded separately or as part of the combined Feastday Gifts and Pranks pack. It is bundled with Dragon Age: Origins - Ultimate Edition.
- Prior to December 7, 2012, certain in-game items were only available through limited promotional opportunities. From December 7, 2012, onwards, with the exception of the Blood Dragon armor as well as the Collector's Edition exclusive items, players may unlock all promotional and exclusive items in Origins and its expansion pack for free.
