= Dragon Age: Origins – Return to Ostagar =

2010 video game content

- Developer: BioWare
- Publisher: Electronic Arts
- Producer: Fernando Melo
- Designer: Rob Bartel
- Programmer: Owen Borstad
- Writer: Rob Bartel
- Series: Dragon Age
- Engine: Eclipse Engine
- Platforms: Xbox 360; Windows; PlayStation 3
- Release: Xbox 360 (initial release); January 13, 2010; Xbox 360 (re-release), Windows; January 29, 2010; PlayStation 3; March 11, 2010
- Genre: Role-playing
- Mode: Single-player

Dragon Age: Origins – Return to Ostagar is a downloadable content (DLC) pack for the 2009 fantasy role-playing video game Dragon Age: Origins developed by BioWare and published by Electronic Arts. It was digitally released for Xbox 360, PlayStation 3, and Microsoft Windows between January and March 2010. The pack follows the surviving members of the Grey Warden branch in the kingdom of Ferelden in Thedas, the setting of the Dragon Age franchise. The Wardens return to the ruined fortress of Ostagar in the aftermath of a great battle between its defenders and an invading force of monstrous Darkspawn which takes place during an early sequence in Origins, which resulted in the deaths of Ferelden's king as well as the entirety of the Grey Warden leadership.

Return to Ostagar is the first post-launch single-player narrative content pack for Dragon Age: Origins. It received a mixed reception from video game publications, with praise for the exploration of backstory and lore around the Battle of Ostagar, a pivotal moment in the franchise's in-universe narrative, as well as criticism for its perceived lack of value for money and shallow gameplay content. The content pack's troubled release schedule have also received significant coverage.

== Contents ==
A gameplay screenshot showing Cailan's defiled corpse as discovered by the player's party.

Dragon Age: Origins – Return to Ostagar is a downloadable content (DLC) pack for the 2009 role-playing video game Dragon Age: Origins. The player assumes the role of a member of an order of warriors called the Grey Wardens, who are sworn to oppose the monstrous Darkspawn from overrunning the world of Thedas. Early in the story of Origins, the player character survived the disastrous Battle of Ostagar, an event considered to be an important or unforgettable moment in the franchise's history by commentators. Josh Straub from Game Informer said the outcome of the battle, which resulted in the deaths of the majority of the Wardens based in Ferelden and the unchallenged spread of the Darkspawn Blight throughout the kingdom, became the "lynchpin" that has shaped the narrative direction of the entire Dragon Age series.

In Return to Ostagar, the player character learns of another survivor of the battle, a former guard in service of the recently deceased King Cailan Theirin, who is seeking help from the Wardens. When encountered, the man reveals that Cailan had wanted the Grey Wardens to claim some of his possessions in the event of his death. The objectives for the return trip to the ruins of Ostagar in the southern part of Ferelden involve the retrieval of important classified documents as well as Cailan's arms and golden armor set. The final fate of King Cailan is an important plot element of Return to Ostagar as the player's party become involved in the search and disposal of his body.

Players may explore the backstory of major characters such as Loghain Mac Tir, Cailan's father-in-law who commanded a contingent of reinforcements to abandon the Ferelden army to the Darkspawn hordes. Players are also given the opportunity to salvage the weaponry of the last Grey Warden Commander, Duncan, who mentored the player character, and recruit a Mabari War Hound as a party member if they have not already done so. Return to Ostagar includes several achievements, which mostly involve the killing of Darkspawn enemies.

== Development and release ==
Mark Darrah, a producer who worked with the developmental team of Origins, explained in an interview that the team would decide on the content of a DLC pack by assessing storytelling opportunities that could strengthen the player character's involvement within the setting. The team chose to revisit Ostagar as there were many unanswered questions in the base game about the Battle of Ostagar, which he identified as the pivotal moment when the player character "truly becomes a Grey Warden", and thus it made sense to develop a content pack which investigates the aftermath of the conflict and explore its emotional power.

The release schedule for Return to Ostagar went through numerous delays and disruptions. It was originally intended for release on the Xbox 360 and PC on January 5, 2010. By January 4, 2010, BioWare announced that the content pack would not be released on the scheduled date, after a problem was spotted at the last minute during certification. Return to Ostagar was later released on January 13, 2010, for Xbox 360 on Xbox Live, but was removed from the service the following day on January 14, 2010, due to a previously undetected issue. BioWare staff explained that the issue was a technical complication created by a title update that had launched simultaneously with the Xbox Live release, which affected gameplay mechanics of specialization classes for player characters and prevented level progression, and recommended that players do not download the title update. BioWare co-founder Ray Muzyka later suggested that it was the result of a communication error with BioWare distribution's partners, which meant that the developers had to spend time fixing the software bug introduced by the title update, and the DLC pack had to be re-certified in preparation for a re-release. According to producer Fernando Melo, BioWare updated their test plans across all platforms to take edge cases into account and implemented more detailed test passes as preventative measures in response to the issue.

Return to Ostagar was released for Microsoft Windows on January 29, 2010, and was re-released on Xbox Live Marketplace on the same date. To access the re-released content for Xbox 360, another title update had to be downloaded. The PlayStation 3 version was released on the PlayStation Network (PSN) on March 11, 2010. Along with other downloadable content packs for Origins, Return to Ostagar was bundled and released as part of the compilation called Dragon Age: Origins – Ultimate Edition, released on October 26, 2010. Copies of the European release of the PlayStation 3 port of Ultimate Edition was known for its erroneous omission of Return to Ostagar. Melo explained in an announcement that while there is a DLC listed with the same name on the package, it "appears to be the contents of one of the other DLCs". As a solution, EA Customer Support representatives offered vouchers for affected customers to download the content pack directly from the PSN Store.

== Reception ==
Dragon Age: Origins – Return to Ostagar

Aggregate score
Aggregator	Score
Metacritic	PC: 69/100; X360: 54/100

Review scores
Publication	Score
Eurogamer	4/10
GamePro	5/10
GameRevolution	2.5/10
GameZone	7/10
IGN	8/10
PC Gamer (UK)	3/10
Pelit (Finland)	7.5/10

According to the review aggregator Metacritic, the Microsoft Windows and Xbox 360 versions of Return to Ostagar received "mixed or average reviews" from video game publications.

Among the reviewers who responded positively to Return to Ostagar included Steve Butts from IGN, who summarized the overall gameplay experience as the opportunity to get closure over a prior defeat and earn worthwhile loot at the same time. He remarked while the pack does not add anything innovative to the Dragon Age experience, the story content is as good as the base game's while conveniently tying up one of its campaign's loose ends. Similarly, Darren Arquette from GameZone said that while it does not offer anything new in terms of gameplay, it was unnecessary for the developers to attempt the implementation of new features into what is otherwise an excellent battle system from the base game. Return to Ostagar was summarized as an "interesting side attraction" and "entertaining for what it was", though an unfavorable comparison was drawn to Dragon Age: Origins – Awakening as the more worthwhile purchase. The Finnish video game publication Pelit formed the view that the pack's pricing is in line with the length and depth of its content.

Conversely, Return to Ostagar has received criticism for its short length and a perceived lack of meaningful content. Dan Whitehead from Eurogamer said the pricing and overall quality of Return to Ostagar does not provide any satisfactory answers to contemporary issues, such as the appropriate inclusion or segregation of content for paid DLC, or the value for money that DLC's were supposed to represent at a time when these features were not yet standard offerings in the video game industry. Whitehead summarized the pack as a "feeble half-baked" effort which is "a step in the wrong direction" for the developers, and the potential of Ostagar itself as a significant location for the setting remains untapped. Mitchell Dyer from GamePro disparaged the DLC pack's poor value for money and remarked that while five dollars is not a costly expense for extra content, it is hard for him to recommend a "bare-bones" content pack like Return to Ostagar for anyone who is not already emotionally invested in the characters and story events of Origins like Duncan's death. GameRevolution was highly critical of the pack and criticized its storytelling, combat, class-specific loot and variety of opponents, praising only its "excellent re-imagining of Ostagar".

The problematic software release life cycle of Return to Ostagar had attracted commentary. Florian Totu from Softpedia observed the development and release for Return to Ostagar to be troubled by unwanted events and strange delays, while Owen Good from Kotaku compared the situation to "BioWare letting Charlie Brown kick the DLC football". Dyer said the long wait he endured due to the unexpected delays and product recall from Xbox Live made his disappointing gameplay experience "taste even more bitter". Andy Griffiths from GamerZines suggested that the mishaps throughout January 2010 were the result of "growing pains associated with digital content" and that such mistakes should become less frequent once the relevant distribution channel become accustomed to such methods. Logan Westbrook from The Escapist commented that while the omission of Return to Ostagar for the European edition of Dragon Age: Origins Ultimate Edition was embarrassing for the developer and publisher, the issue is easily fixable with the caveat that affected customers have ready access to the internet for their PS3 consoles.
