= Isabela (Dragon Age) =

Fictional character in Dragon Age

- Dragon Age character
- Concept art of Isabela's appearance for Dragon Age II, as published in Dragon Age: The World of Thedas Volume 2 (2015)
- First appearance: Dragon Age: Origins (2009)
- Created by: BioWare
- Voiced by: Mika Simmons (Dragon Age: Origins only); Victoria Kruger

In-universe information
- Species: Human
- Occupation: Pirate captain

Isabela is a character in BioWare's Dragon Age series. First appearing as a minor non-player character in Dragon Age: Origins, Isabela returns in Dragon Age II as an optional party member and potential love interest to the player character. A pirate captain from Rivain, a nation located in the north of the world of Thedas, the setting of the Dragon Age series, her actions prior to the events of Dragon Age II directly led to the political crisis between the city of Kirkwall and the large humanoid species known as Qunari that drove much of the game's plot.

Isabela appears as a playable character in Dragon Age: Inquisition through the free Dragonslayer multiplayer expansion. In Dragon Age: The Veilguard, she becomes associated with a major faction in the game called the Lords of Fortune.

Outside of the video games, Isabela is a major character of the following digital comic series: Dragon Age: The Silent Grove, Dragon Age: Those Who Speak and Dragon Age: Until We Sleep. Those Who Speak explores her background story and complicated past interactions with the Qunari in detail.

The character has been discussed by critics for her sexuality, self-possession, romance path, and treatment by the game's writing and fandom. Critics have variously praised her as a confident and nuanced female character, while also criticizing the series' reliance on sexualized jokes and stereotypes in the way she is depicted in most of her appearances.

== Concept and characterization ==
Isabela is characterized as a flirtatious, irreverent pirate captain who values personal freedom and resists authority. In Dragon Age II, she is written with a strongly sexual public persona; her companion dialogue and romance path gradually reveal insecurity, fear of attachment, and a capacity for loyalty. Her banter with Aveline Vallen contrasts Isabela's libertine attitudes with Aveline's social conservatism and sense of duty, with their initially antagonistic exchanges developing into a more affectionate rapport. In an interview with Boss Fight Books for its volume about Dragon Age II, writer Lukas Kristjanson revealed to author Charlotte Reber he had written a line of dialogue so raunchy that it left the writing team speechless, prompting lead writer David Gaider to ask lead designer Mike Laidlaw for an official decision on whether it could remain in the game. Reber identified it as part of the late-game banter in which Isabela teases Aveline about married life with her husband, and noted that the line was ultimately retained.

BioWare described the character's multiplayer incarnation as "Isabela, the Duelist", a swashbuckling dual-dagger rogue who also uses a crossbow to pin down enemies. The character's design in Inquisition was built around new mechanics rather than a direct corresponding role to one of the companion characters from the single-player campaign. In an EA interview about the expansion, BioWare staff explained that Isabela builds "Vendetta" stacks during combat, which modify her other abilities, while her "Elusive" mechanic gives her an evasion-focused playstyle. The same interview identified abilities such as Blinding Shot and Broadsides as examples of her new multiplayer kit.

== Appearances ==
=== Dragon Age: Origins ===
Isabela first appears in Dragon Age: Origins as a minor non-player character encountered by the player character, the Warden, in the city of Denerim. She can teach the Warden the Duelist specialization after the player completes an encounter involving her.

=== Dragon Age II ===
Isabela returns in Dragon Age II as an optional companion and romance option for Hawke, the game's player character. She is a rogue whose combat style emphasizes mobility, dual-wielding, and swashbuckling. At the beginning of the game, she is stranded in Kirkwall after losing her ship. She joins Hawke's group while attempting to recover an object connected to her past. Dragon Age II expalores her background story as a notorious pirate captain.

Isabela's personal storyline is central to the second act of Dragon Age II. It is eventually revealed that she stole the Tome of Koslun, a sacred Qunari text, causing the Qunari to remain in Kirkwall and intensifying tensions between them and the city's authorities. Depending on the player's relationship with her and earlier choices, Isabela may flee Kirkwall with the relic or return to give it to the Arishok, the leader of the Qunari forces. Hawke may then surrender her to the Qunari, duel the Arishok, or fight the Qunari directly.

=== Dragon Age: Inquisition ===
Released for supported platforms in May 2015, the Dragonslayer multiplayer expansion for Inquisition added Isabela, now known by the "Raider Queen of the Eastern Seas" as her sobriquet, as a playable character.

=== Dragon Age: The Veilguard ===
Isabela appears in Dragon Age: The Veilguard as a senior figure among the Lords of Fortune, a Rivaini treasure-hunting faction. In the Hall of Valor quest, the game's player character Rook is to travel to the Lords of Fortune arena, speak with Isabela, and complete a series of ten combat matches; after each victory, the player returns to Isabela to continue the challenge.

Isabela is also involved in Taash’s companion storyline. In one notable scene at a tavern, she accidentally misgenders Taash while recounting one of their exploits to Rook. After correcting herself, Isabela performs press-ups and explains the practice as "pulling a Barv", a Lords of Fortune custom in which a person who has made a mistake performs a brief physical act of atonement rather than centering the apology on their own guilt.

=== Comics and other media ===
Isabela appears with Alistair and Varric Tethras in a trilogy of Dragon Age comics published by Dark Horse Comics: Dragon Age: The Silent Grove, Dragon Age: Those Who Speak, and Dragon Age: Until We Sleep. The comics continue the stories of several major characters after the events of Dragon Age II, with Those Who Speak exploring parts of Isabela's background in detail.

== Reception and analysis ==
=== Critical reception ===
Kris Ligman of PopMatters praised Isabela's depiction in Dragon Age II, arguing that the character's frank sexual attitudes function not merely as titillation but as a means of humor, self-expression, and character development. Ligman focused particularly on Isabela's conversations with Aveline, writing that their exchanges begin from a rivalry based on Isabela's sexual libertinism and Aveline's conservatism but develop into a more nuanced depiction of insecurity, self-knowledge, and female friendship. Ligman argued that Isabela's confidence is not simply a performance for others, but is connected to her own insistence that other people's judgments do not define her.

Aimee Hart of Gayming Magazine described Isabela as one of the best characters in Dragon Age, emphasizing her attraction to women, desire for personal freedom, protectiveness toward vulnerable women, and reluctance to accept love because of her past trauma. Hart argued that Isabela's warning to a female Hawke about predatory men in the Hanged Man, and her disapproval of cruelty toward abused or vulnerable women, made her protective instincts a recurring part of her characterization rather than an isolated moment. Hart compared Isabela's return at the end of the Qunari storyline to Han Solo's return in Star Wars, interpreting it as a heroic moment that reframes her selfishness and emotional guardedness. On the other hand, Hart also criticized parts of the game's writing for relying on sexist jokes about Isabela's sexuality, arguing that the game sometimes undermines its own more complex characterization of her. Hart additionally noted racist responses to the character within parts of the modding community.

Reber said in an interview about the Dragon Age II edition for Boss Fight Books that she would include Isabela as part of her usual adventuring party, partly because she found the character to be a comparatively easygoing companion and that she enjoyed the banter she would have with Merrill, another party member. She also pointed to Isabela's late-game teasing of Aveline about married life as an example of the game's raunchy companion dialogue and comic writing which she found to be entertaining.

Writing for Boing Boing, Tanya DePass identified Isabela as one of the few characters of color in the early Dragon Age games, using her as part of a broader critique of racial representation in the series' fantasy world.

=== Analysis ===
F. Schönberg and Miriam Scuderi discussed Isabela in Paidia as part of a broader analysis of gender, sexuality, and claims of historical verisimilitude in the Dragon Age franchise. They identified Isabela as one of the series' overtly LGBTQ+ characters, but argued that such characters are often framed through suspicion, sexualization, or instability. Their analysis described Isabela's design and introduction as strongly sexualized, and noted that her bisexuality and sexual availability are repeatedly made objects of commentary within the series.

Hart separately discussed Isabela within the broader reception of Dragon Age II's bisexual romance options, noting that the game's major romanceable companions, except Sebastian Vael, can be romanced by Hawke regardless of gender. Hart argued that the backlash to the game's bisexual romance structure reflected wider resistance to bisexual representation in games, while also acknowledging that Isabela's portrayal relied more heavily on overt sexualization than the other bisexual companions.

Writing for The Beat, Kelas Lloyd observed that her appearance in The Veilguard recontextualizes her earlier role in Dragon Age II; in the game, the Lords of Fortune are presented as treasure hunters who use cultural consultants and avoid keeping important artifacts from the cultures to which they belong. Lloyd connected this to Isabela's theft of the Tome of Koslun in Dragon Age II, which contributed to the Qunari crisis in Kirkwall, and argued that the change could be read as plausible character growth. However, Lloyd criticized the game for not explicitly acknowledging that earlier incident, arguing that a single line connecting the Lords' new practice to Isabela's past would have strengthened the continuity for returning players.

Commentators have discussed the tavern scene between Rook, Isabela, and Taash in relation to The Veilguard's handling of pronouns, apology, and non-binary representation. As part of a broader critique of The Veilguard's trans and non-binary representation, Harvey Randall of PC Gamer argued that the game made a sincere and sometimes effective attempt at inclusion, but that its use of modern queer terminology often felt insufficiently embedded in the cultures and history of Thedas. In that context, Randall treated Isabela's explanation of the Lords of Fortune's physical act of apology as an example of the game's wider difficulty in making queer language and social practices feel culturally situated within its fantasy setting.
