= List of Dragon Age: Origins characters =

The Warden's party in Dragon Age: Origins. From left to right: Oghren, Leliana, Morrigan, Sten, "The Warden" (the player character), "Dog", Alistair, Wynne, Zevran and Shale.

The Warden-Commander's party in Dragon Age: Origins – Awakening. From left to right: Velanna, Nathaniel, Oghren, "The Warden-Commander" (the player character), Anders, Sigrun, and Justice.

Dragon Age: Origins is a story-driven role-playing game set in a world called Thedas, where the player usually assumes control of one primary character as the protagonist of the story. Throughout the course of the story, player characters in Origins are continually presented with choices for how to deal with major game events, and any decisions made usually influence the overarching narrative. While the player does retain control over forks in the narrative, the overarching narrative in each game follows a specified path, and the player's influence is confined to certain pre-ordained events in the game rather than the entire narrative itself.

The supporting characters of the Dragon Age series have motivations and agendas that carry the narrative progression with an exposition, climax, and resolution; the player character is important, but often not the focal point of the progression of events in the plot. While both player characters and other characters carry narrative progression, companion characters are a pivotal feature of the series, who help create a richer and engaging narrative experience through their actions as well as their reactions to the player character's actions and choices. Companions tend to have a very particular world view, and the nature of the player character's actions will have a positive or negative effect on their companions.

This article describes player characters, important party companions, notable supporting characters, and major antagonists who appear in the video game Dragon Age: Origins, its expansion Dragon Age: Origins - Awakening, and associated DLC's. Certain characters have names chosen by the player. These characters are designated the name they are addressed by in-game. In the case of party members, personal quests are also noted as these explore the characters' background.

== Player characters ==
=== The Warden ===
Race: Player's choice Gender: Player's choice Class: Player's choice

The player character and main protagonist of Origins, whose visage, hairstyle, voice, race, first name, origin, gender, and class are chosen by the player. There are six possible origin stories: Human Noble, Circle Mage (Human or Elf), City Elf, Dalish Elf, Dwarf Noble and Dwarf Commoner. The player character's surname is dependent on the origin story chosen, which also affects how other characters within the game react to the player's actions. Regardless of origin, the player character is presented as an individual of exceptional strength, skill, and significance. Multiple characters, unique to each of the origin stories, will join the player character's party temporarily as part of the ongoing narrative.

After a brief trial depicted in their origin story, the player character is ultimately recruited to join the Grey Wardens, a mystical organization of warriors created to fight the Darkspawn, a race of evil, tainted creatures. The character is henceforth referred to simply as The Warden, and occasionally by surname in the games dialogue. Upon the conclusion of the Warden's origin story, the narrative resumes a single strand for all players, where the Warden travels to Ostagar, the site of an upcoming major battle with the Darkspawn. The Warden is guided by their recruiter Duncan, who sets in motion the Warden's initiation into their organization. The Warden and two other candidates, Daveth and Ser Jory, are tasked with travelling into the forest near Ostagar to procure some ancient Grey Warden treaties and vials of blood obtained by killing Darkspawn. Duncan then conducts an initiation ritual called the Joining which involving the imbibing of Darkspawn blood by the ritual candidates; only the Warden survives the process.

The Warden would be directed to aid the war effort at the Battle of Ostagar, where the Ferelden army under the leadership of King Cailan Theirin attempts to push back the Darkspawn along with the Grey Wardens. The Warden lights a beacon to signal for reinforcements led by Teyrn Loghain, but Loghain responds by ordering his forces to retreat and leaving the entire Ferelden and Grey Warden contingent led by Cailan to die on the battlefield. The Warden and Duncan's protege Alistair are rescued by the Witch of the Wilds, Flemeth, becoming one of the few surviving Grey Wardens left in Ferelden. The Warden's goal for the rest of Origins is to utilize the treaties that compel the nations of Thedas to cooperate with their order to stop the fifth coming of the Darkspawn Blight led by an Archdemon, a terrifying and deranged draconic monster who controls the Darkspawn hordes. This involves traveling across Ferelden's lands to secure an alliance with the dwarves of Orzammar, the Dalish elves near the Brecilian Forest (or a pack of werewolves), and the Ferelden Circle of Magi (or the Ferelden Templar Order), as well as rallying the support of the Ferelden nobility against Loghain and unite the kingdom under a new ruler against the Darkspawn hordes.

After the Archdemon is slain, the Warden will gain renown as the "Hero of Ferelden" regardless of their final fate. While the Hero of Ferelden does not appear in Dragon Age II, the character has an effect in the storyline, and depending on origin will actually have connections to some of the party members: for example, the Human Circle Mage is a relative of Dragon Age II protagonist Hawke from the maternal side, and the Dalish Elf is a member of Merrill's clan.

=== The Warden-Commander ===
Race: Player's choice Gender: Player's choice Class: Player's choice

The Warden-Commander is the Commander of the Grey in Ferelden, the ruler of Vigil's Keep and the arling of Amaranthine, and the player-controlled protagonist of the expansion for Origins, Dragon Age: Origins - Awakening. The Warden-Commander can be either a Warden imported from Origins, now known as the Hero of Ferelden, with any origin story and decision making from that game intact. Six months after the conclusion of the Fifth Blight, the Hero of Ferelden has been promoted to Commander of the Grey and assigned as Ferelden's new Warden-Commander. In the alternative, if the Warden of Origins has sacrificed themselves to slay the Archdemon or if the player starts a new game without importing an existing character, a new Grey Warden from Orlais will be made Ferelden's new Warden-Commander as part of the narrative. An Orlesian Warden-Commander will start at Level 18, and the people of Amaranthine will treat an Orlesian Warden-Commander with suspicion, as opposed to respect towards the Hero of Ferelden.

The Warden-Commander is also the player-controlled protagonist of the standalone downloadable content (DLC) packs, The Golems of Amgarrak and Witch Hunt, and are assisted by party companions who are exclusive to the aforementioned DLC content packs.

=== Hurlock Vanguard ===
A player-controlled Hurlock Vanguard is the protagonist of the Origins DLC, The Darkspawn Chronicles. The Darkspawn Chronicles takes a look at an alternate history in the Dragon Age universe, allowing the player to see what might have happened if the Warden had died during the Joining ceremony, and the assembled forces marched under Alistair's command instead. The player-controlled Hurlock Vanguard is summoned by the Archdemon to lead the Darkspawn to victory at The Battle of Denerim, and receives directives through the Archdemon's whispers. The Hurlock Vanguard has the power to enthrall, or forcibly recruit, its fellow Darkspawn and drive them into the heat of battle. Various Darkspawn creatures that may be enthralled to serve as the Vanguard's companions include Genlocks, Hurlocks, Shrieks, spellcasting Emissaries, and Ogres.

=== Leliana ===
Voiced by: Corinne Kempa

Leliana is the protagonist of the Origins DLC Leliana's Song, a prequel to the main campaign for Origins which details her complicated past. She is a former bard from the Orlesian Empire, where she often undertook work on the side as an assassin and spy for her patrons.

Following the events of Leliana's Song, Leliana is encountered early on in Origins as an optional party member. She had settled down in the Ferelden village of Lothering as a lay sister of the Andrastrian Chantry, and after breaking up a brawl at the local tavern, she insists on joining the Ferelden Wardens after receiving what she believes was a vision from the Maker, the deity venerated by the Chantry. She is bisexual, and thus a possible romance option for both male and female player characters. Leliana is highly religious and believes in doing the right thing. This means if the player-controlled Warden chooses to commit a morally reprehensible act like defiling the fabled Urn of Sacred Ashes, she may attack the Warden and dies in the attempt, though Leliana continues to appear in the Dragon Age series regardless of her fate in Origins. Leliana's personal quest involves dealing with Marjolaine, her old mentor and lover.

== Dragon Age: Origins companions ==
=== Alistair ===
Voiced by: Steve Valentine

Alistair is a young warrior with a wry and irreverent sense of humor, who was initiated into the Grey Wardens by Duncan prior to the player character's own recruitment. Prior to joining the Wardens, Alistair trained with the Chantry to become a templar, the military branch of the Chantry trained to hunt apostate mages and supervise the Circle mages under their watch. As such, he is hesitant to trust blood mages (also known as "maleficar") or any mages who operate outside of the Circle. He is a mandatory companion in Origins, and only leaves the party if the Warden allows Loghain to undergo the Joining ritual to become a Grey Warden during the Landsmeet. Alistair is a romance option for female characters, and depending on the choices and origin of the Warden, they can potentially become the King and Queen of Ferelden. The Warden has the opportunity to motivate Alistair, helping him develop his potential as a leader figure, and grow as an individual into becoming mature enough to accept the call to be king should the Warden support him as heir to the Ferelden throne.

Depending on the player's choices during the events of Dragon Age: Origins, Alistair may make cameo appearances in subsequent installments of the Dragon Age series. He is also a major protagonist in the digital comic series The Silent Grove, Those Who Speak and Until We Sleep, whose plot follows BioWare's own canon in which Alistair is king of Ferelden.

=== Morrigan ===
Voiced by: Claudia Black

Morrigan is a shapeshifting apostate mage, raised and taught by her mother, Flemeth, in the wilds of Ferelden. Morrigan joins the Warden's party early in the game shortly after Flemeth's rescue from the battle at Ostagar. She is a romance option for male player characters. Near the end of the game before the slaying of the Archdemon, she reveals that a Grey Warden need not die in order to slay the Archdemon as long as the Warden, Alistair, or Loghain if he has replaced Alistair, impregnates Morrigan with a child who will then carry the soul of the Old God upon the Archdemon's death, and thus spare the life of the Grey Warden who dealt the final death blow. If the Warden refuses to sleep with Morrigan, or is female and does not ask Alistair or Loghain to do the deed, she will become infuriated and leaves the party permanently. Morrigan appears as the central focus of the Witch Hunt DLC pack; the Warden-Commander tracks Morrigan down two years after the Blight's end.

=== Dog ===
Mabari war hounds, a powerful breed of dog which play an essential role in the Fereldan military, make recurring appearances in the Dragon Age series. These trained hounds are able to break lines of pikemen, pull knights off of horses, and, when in a pack, are capable of stirring panic in the most hardened of soldiers.

"Dog" is the default name for the Warden's Mabari companion in Origins. Dog always has a maximum approval rating, is unconditionally loyal, and does not leave the Warden under any circumstances. If the player character is a Human Noble, Dog joins the player character's party in their origin story during a small side quest. If the player character is not a Human Noble, or if they did not complete the side quest during the Human Noble origin, then the player character has a chance to acquire a different Dog through another side quest at Ostagar. The "Return to Ostagar" DLC offers a second chance (third for a Warden of Human Noble Origin) to recruit Dog.

Dog is a warrior and capable of equipping unique collars and warpaints that serve as substitutes for weapons and armor. He also has a set of dog-specific skills to learn. He has no personal quest; however, having him "mark his territory" at certain landmarks in different areas affords him a "Mabari Dominance" buff, augmenting his strength, willpower and constitution attributes while remaining in that area. He also has the unique ability to fetch random items when asked to do so.

A Mabari war hound is also featured as a companion of the Warden-Commander in the Witch Hunt DLC. It may be the same Dog the player character recruited during Origins, or a different one. Codex entries will reflect this for each version, respectively.

=== Sten ===
Voiced by: Mark Hildreth

Sten is a hornless Qunari warrior and an optional companion. He is found imprisoned in a cage at Lothering for murdering a family of farmers. The Warden may choose to persuade the Revered Mother of the Lothering Chantry to release the Qunari into their custody, thus freeing Sten. If the Warden's lockpicking skill is high enough, the cage door lock may be picked, allowing him to join without the Revered Mother's permission. If the Warden chooses not to free Sten, the Warden will not be able to recruit him once they complete at least one major quest in the main questline, as Lothering will be overrun by the Blight after the Warden does so. Sten's personal quest involves a search for his lost sword, Asala. It is revealed that he was the only survivor of his scouting party, and had panicked when he found his sword missing, and murdered the family that had rescued him in grief.

In the digital comic Dragon Age: Those Who Speak, which follows Bioware's canon where Alistair is king of Ferelden and that Hawke killed the Arishok in Dragon Age II, Sten is revealed to be the new Arishok.

=== Oghren ===
Voiced by: Steve Blum

Oghren is a dwarf from House Branka (formerly House Kondrat) and was once a promising member of the Warrior Caste. He is the ex-husband of the only living Paragon as of Origins, Branka, and meets the Warden in Orzammar, one of only two remaining dwarven cities at the time the story of Origins takes place. Oghren joins the Warden's party as they are about to embark for the Darkspawn-infested Deep Roads, a series of paths and crossroads connected to a network of now-abandoned thaigs or dwarven cities in a search for the Anvil of the Void. Oghren's personal quest involves a past relationship with a female dwarf, Felsi, who eventually moved to the surface world and is currently employed at the Spoiled Princess tavern near Lake Calenhad.

Oghren returns in Origins – Awakening as a party member. After the events of Origins, he had settled down with Felsi and had a child with her. Eventually, he made his way to Vigil's Keep in order to join the Grey Wardens, only to find it overrun with Darkspawn. Felsi may eventually arrive at Vigil's Keep and get into an argument with Oghren for abandoning his family.

=== Wynne ===
Voiced by: Susan Boyd Joyce

Wynne is a Senior Enchanter of the Ferelden Circle of Magi and a powerful spirit healer. The Warden may first meet Wynne at the army camp at Ostagar, near the mage tents. She survives the Battle of Ostagar and is later encountered at Kinloch Hold, where the Circle of Magi is based, as an optional companion. If the Warden is accompanied by Morrigan while recruiting her in the Circle Tower, Wynne may attack the Warden, depending on how the Warden responds to Morrigan when she expresses disgust for the Circle. Following the liberation of the Circle Tower from demons and abominations, Wynne will offer to continue traveling with the Warden to help end the Fifth Blight. Wynne is a firm believer in all that is righteous and does not tolerate any morally objectionable actions, especially those involving blood magic or the indiscriminate killing of innocents; she may attack the Warden or leave the party if the Warden commits any such actions. Wynne's personal quests involve two events that will trigger after the Warden speaks to Wynne about her tiring easily and needing rest. The Warden will eventually have the opportunity to obtain an ability upgrade for Wynne, and help her reconcile with her former apprentice.

Wynne makes an appearance in Origins – Awakening as a quest giver if she survives the events of Origins. She also makes her final appearance as a major character in the novel Dragon Age: Asunder, which takes places several months before Cassandra Pentaghast's interrogation of Varric in Kirkwall.

=== Zevran Arainai ===
Voiced by: Jon Curry

Zevran Arainai is an Antivan city elf and member of the Antivan Crows, a guild of thieves and assassins notorious in all of Thedas. Zevran and his men were hired with the intention of killing any Grey Warden survivors of Ostagar; he will be encountered during a random event in which the Antivan Crows have set up a trap for the Wardens. He will be the sole survivor of the failed attempt to assassinate the Warden, forcing the Warden to either kill him, let him go or recruit him. Zevran's personality is practical to the point of ruthlessness, and will generally approve if the Warden does whatever it takes to gain the strongest possible allies against the Blight. While Zevran has no personal quest, there will be a point before the Landsmeet where the Warden meets Taliesen, an Antivan Crow and former lover of Zevran. Depending on Zevran's approval rating and relationship with the Warden, he may remain loyal to the Warden or defect and ally with Taliesen. Zevran is bisexual, and thus a possible romance option for both male and female Warden.

=== Shale ===
Voiced by: Geraldine Becker

Shale is an optional companion who is introduced in Origins via the DLC content, The Stone Prisoner. Shale is a stone golem who has a negative perception of humans and living beings after a life of servitude to a former master and having been stuck in place in the village for a long duration, as well as a hatred of birds due to being a frequent target of avian defecation. In order to recruit Shale, the Warden must first complete a quest in the Village of Honnleath and learn an activation code for the golem. Later in the story, the golem will attack the Warden if they choose to side with Branka in a quest pertaining to the Anvil of the Void. If Shale is not in the active party, it will confront the Warden upon their return to the party camp and will leave the party unless persuaded otherwise. Shale's personal quest involves a search for answers to its past. The quest leads the Warden to a long-forgotten dwarven city, where they find a monument. Upon observation of such monument, the Warden finds out that Shale was formerly Shayle of House Cadash, a female dwarf who had volunteered herself, amongst other volunteers, to become a golem to fight the Darkspawn threat.

=== Teyrn Loghain Mac Tir ===
Voiced by: Simon Templeman

Loghain Mac Tir is one of the main antagonists of Dragon Age: Origins. He was King Maric's right hand during Ferelden's war against the Orlesians. First seen at Ostagar, he is introduced as the general who provides strategies for Maric's son, Cailan, in the defense of the realm from the Blight. However, during the battle, after the signal is given for Loghain to launch an attack on the Darkspawn's flank, he strays from the plan and retreats from the field, along with his army, leaving both the King and the Grey Wardens to their deaths. For the majority of the game from then on, Loghain takes up residence in Denerim and appoints himself regent to his daughter, Queen Anora and seizes power as the de facto ruler of Ferelden. He is served by his loyal right-hand woman Ser Cauthrien, and is in league with Uldred and Arl Howe.

Loghain may join the Warden's party as a warrior very late in the game, during the Landsmeet. After the Warden and Loghain duel each other, the Warden may choose to either have Loghain executed for his crimes or inducted into the Grey Wardens. Allowing Loghain to live will force Alistair to leave the party in disgust and will allow Loghain to join the Warden's party as a new Grey Warden.

Loghain makes a small cameo appearance in Dragon Age: Origins – Awakening should he survive in Dragon Age: Origins where he informs the Warden he is being sent by the Grey Wardens to Orlais for aid, and commands the Warden to treat his daughter well if he married Anora.

== Dragon Age: Origins - Awakening companions ==
=== Anders ===
Voiced by: Greg Ellis

Anders is a wise-cracking human apostate mage who has escaped the Circle of Magi multiple times, only to be captured and brought back by the templars each time. When the Warden-Commander arrives during the assault on Vigil's Keep in the beginning of Origins - Awakening, Anders is encountered fending off Darkspawn on his own, with several templars lying dead around him. At the conclusion of the siege, the Warden-Commander conscripts him into the Grey Wardens in order to save him from the templars. Anders uses magic in combat and his specialization is a variation of Spirit Healer; he has the ability to heal wounded allies and revive fallen allies in battle.

=== Justice ===
Voiced by: Adam Leadbeater

Justice is a Fade spirit who accidentally possessed the body of the dead Grey Warden, Kristoff in Origins – Awakening. He is presented as a benevolent spirit that aspires to justice as its only attribute, knowing and caring little for the world outside the fade beyond viewing everyone who does inhabit it with condescending pity. He opposes the Baroness of the Blackmarsh, a now-deserted marshland along the northeastern shores of the city of Amaranthine. If the Warden-Commander recruits him, he begins to experience Kristoff's memories, and after a particularly distressing visit from the wife of the late Kristoff, he starts questioning his identity. The Warden-Commander may choose to help Justice track down Kristoff's wife to seek closure.

=== Nathaniel Howe ===
Voiced by: Simon Chadwick

The son of the late Rendon Howe, traitor to Teyrn Bryce Cousland of Highever and the Grey Wardens. He is skilled in archery, and knows how to bypass traps and pick locks. Nathaniel is found in the dungeons of Vigil's Keep following the initial Darkspawn attack, awaiting the Warden's judgment. He snuck into the Keep, which was part of his family's former arling, with the intention of assassinating the Warden-Commander. However, once inside, he had a change of heart and decided only to try steal back some of his family's belongings. The Warden-Commander may decide to have him executed, let him go, or conscript him into the Grey Wardens. If released, he later tracks down the Warden-Commander and asks to join the Grey Wardens.

He initially blames the Grey Wardens for his father's death and his family's fall from grace, claiming that his father was merely on the wrong side of the war. During the events of Origins, he was away at the Free Marches, and has lost contact with most of his surviving family members. He learns that his sister still lives and is now living in the city of Amaranthine. If he finds his sister she will confront him about his blind love for their father. She explains that their father brought things down on himself and his family, and that he was a lying, traitorous murderer all along. After meeting with Delilah, he no longer blames the Grey Wardens for the downfall of his family and his father's death.

=== Sigrun ===
Voiced by: Natalia Cigliuti

Sigrun is a Legionnaire Scout and member of the Legion of the Dead, an independent branch of the dwarven army that answers directly to the monarchy of Orzammar and sworn to fight the Darkspawn to the death. The Warden-Commander finds her in the thaig Kal'Hirol, which is accessible via a giant chasm which had opened up in the ground, caused by the Blight or other Darkspawn activity. Her entire squad was killed during their investigation of the Darkspawn incursion in this thaig, but she ran away and survived, which she repeatedly expresses guilt over throughout the game, as the Legionaries are considered already dead and therefore should not value their lives anymore. The Warden-Commander may offer to accompany her into the thaig and help defeat their common enemy. After the Warden kills the Broodmothers breeding beneath the thaig, the Warden-Commander may choose to let her be on her way, or offer her a place in the Grey Wardens. She will accept after some minimal encouragement, and survives the Joining, which must be initiated by talking to Seneschal Varel at Vigil's Keep. Once her approval rating is high enough, her personal quest is triggered in Amaranthine where she bumps into someone from her roguish past.

=== Velanna ===
Voiced by: Grey DeLisle

Velanna is a Dalish Keeper who is the sole survivor of a small group of Dalish dissidents that had been wiped out by the Darkspawn. The Warden-Commander encounters Velanna in the Wending Wood, where she is behind the mysterious attacks on the human-run caravans passing through the area. It is revealed that she was manipulated by the Darkspawn into believing that it was humans who attacked her tribe and kidnapped her sister, not the Darkspawn themselves. The Warden-Commander later confronts her at her camp, with the choice of killing Velanna in retribution for the murders she has committed, or attempt to reason with her. She may lead the Warden-Commander into a nearby mine to find her sister, where they meet the Architect, who reveals that Velanna's sister had joined him of her own free will. Once the Warden-Commander makes it through the mine, Velanna demands that the Warden-Commander induct her into the Grey Wardens so she is better able to fight the Darkspawn and save her sister. If her approval rating is high enough, a random encounter on the world map will trigger and more of her past actions will come to light.

== Recurring antagonists ==
=== Arl Rendon Howe ===
Voiced by: Tim Curry

Rendon Howe is the Arl of Amaranthine, and later the self-appointed Teyrn of Highever and Arl of Denerim. Howe is described as "cultured and charming, with an insatiable lust for power, who never hesitates to harm anyone who gets in his way". He is Loghain's closest advisor, providing a shrewd and calculating political aid to Loghain, and serves as a secondary antagonist to the Warden. Howe is notorious for using any means to achieve his desires, including mass murdering the Cousland family and their associates to usurp the title of Teryn of Highever, authorizing torture, and slavery. He meets his downfall when he takes Queen Anora hostage to stop her speaking out at the Landsmeet: the Warden breaks into Howe's Denerim estate to rescue her, and Howe is killed in the process.

For his work as Arl Howe in Origins, Tim Curry was nominated for the Supporting Performance In A Drama award for The National Academy of Video Game Trade Reviewers's 2009 annual awards program honoring video game art, technology, and production.

=== Uldred ===
Voiced by: Barry Dennen

Uldred is an ambitious mage of the Ferelden Circle of Magi at Kinloch Hold. He is first seen at the war council prior to the Battle of Ostagar. He contends that lighting the beacon at the Tower of Ishal is unnecessary and that the Circle of Magi can contribute instead of dispatching Grey Wardens to light a signal fire, but is dismissed by a Chantry Revered Mother. After the Battle of Ostagar, Uldred returned to Kinloch Hold, where he nearly convinced senior members of the Circle to support Loghain Mac Tir, though his treachery is uncovered by Wynne. He tried to take over the Circle by force and summons a Pride Demon, but he is quickly possessed and becomes an abomination. Uldred is eventually stopped and killed by the Warden.

=== The Archdemon ===
The Archdemon leading the Fifth Blight is the central antagonist of Dragon Age: Origins. During the course of Origins, the Archdemon unleashed the Darkspawn hordes on Ferelden, causing untold death and destruction before finally being slain at the battle of Denerim. With the archdemon's death, the Darkspawn are routed and the Fifth Blight ended. The Archdemon's soul has two paths to take - it can transfer into the body of the nearest Grey Warden (killing both in the case of the latter), or it can transfer into Morrigan's unborn child if the dark ritual is performed. It is revealed in Origins - Awakening that the Archdemon in Origins was Urthemiel, once worshipped as one of the Old Gods of the Tevinter Imperium as the "Dragon of Beauty", the patron deity of artists, musicians and poets.

The Archdemon, along with the High Dragon, were the most complex character models in Origins. They measure around the 27,000 polygon mark, and took about five to six weeks to complete. By comparison, most of the other character models in Origins are about 10,000–12,000 polygons including the head and weapons, and would be finished in about three weeks.

=== The Architect ===
Voiced by: Jamie Glover

The Architect appears to be a uniquely intelligent and sentient Darkspawn emissary who does not suffer from a compulsion to find the Old Gods and corrupt them into Archdemons. Lead Character Artist Shane Hawco states that the character was a full collaboration between Origins - Awakening's design team and the character artists. The team were aiming for more than a visual threat; they wanted to emphasize "on his sadistic personality which physically masks his grotesqueness". Haweco revealed that the Architect's in-game mesh is approximately 11,000 polygons, and that the most challenging thing was to use his appearance to showcase his personality and character. The character is described as "highly intelligent, decisive, cold, manipulative and he has little understanding of humanity" and is completely devoid of morality.

The Architect first appears in Dragon Age: The Calling. He wishes to free his Darkspawn brethren from their compulsion by killing the Old Gods; however, he believed the mortal races and Darkspawn would never see eye-to-eye even were they freed from the Old Gods. Viewing the Grey Wardens, who share the same taint as the Darkspawn, as a middle ground, the Architect planned to spread the taint across Thedas in order to create a similar state among the mortal races, even knowing that thousands of people worldwide would die and the survivors would be tainted; he believed the chance of peace between humanity and Darkspawn was worth the high cost. Several of the Grey Wardens agreed with his ideas and allowed their taint to be "quickened", turning them into ghouls. The Grey Wardens, including a young Duncan and King Maric, thwarted the scheme, but the Architect escaped.

In the opening sequence of Origins - Awakening, one of The Architect's "Disciples", a fully sentient awakened Darkspawn known The Withered, led an assault on the Grey Wardens of Vigil's Keep. The Architect is first encountered by the Warden-Commander at a silverite mine in the Wending Wood, where he captures the party and experiments on them. He flees the mine after the Warden-Commander break out of their cell and slays a pair of dragons under his thrall. The Architect is encountered again in the Mother's lair, where he offers an alliance with the Warden-Commander: he explains his research has shown him that by exposing the Darkspawn to the blood of a Grey Warden, the Darkspawn are freed from the call of the Old Gods, preventing them from starting a Blight. The Warden-Commander must decide whether to ally with the Architect in their common interest of stopping the Blights, or kill him and his Warden companion Utha. If they ally with him, the Mother will reveal that prior to the events of Origin, The Architect found the Old God Urthemiel and used Grey Warden blood in an experiment deep below the earth; this backfires and Urthemiel was tainted as an Archdemon, setting in motion the beginning of the Fifth Blight.

=== The Mother ===
Voiced by: Dee Dee Rescher

The Mother was originally a human woman who was corrupted into a monster called a Broodmother, for the sole purpose of breeding Darkspawn. Unlike a previous Broodmother encountered by the Hero of Ferelden in Origins which was a tainted corruption of a dwarven woman, the Mother's upper body has a more slender build with less grotesque features at first glance. The character artist repurposed the old base mesh of the Broodmother encountered in "Origins" to help create a new and improved version, and she is added into the conversation system so that she could converse with the player character. She has the ability to birth monstrous worm-like Darkspawn called "the Children", grubs which hibernate in cocoons after they have been birthed, only emerging when they sense another living being nearby to attack and devour their unfortunate prey. The Mother is designed with a visual link to her Children with her split face and the extra limbs coming out of her back.

Like other awakened Darkspawn known as "Disciples", she is freed from the call of the Old Gods by the Architect. Driven insane by the self-realization of what she had become and the loss of her purpose to find the Old Gods, she mobilizes her forces to ravage both the city of Amaranthine and the Deep Roads, fighting against the forces of the Grey Wardens as well as the Disciples loyal to the Architect.

=== Marjolaine ===
Voiced by: Kath Soucie

Marjolaine is an Orlesian bard, and Leliana's former lover and mentor who trained her in the skills of combat, manipulation, subterfuge. She appears as the main antagonist of Leliana's Song, which explores Leliana's final days as a mercenary and spy under Marjolaine's tutelage, where she tasked Leliana and two other employees to plant a stolen document bearing Orlesian military seals as part of a conspiracy plot, but later framed her protege for the act of treason. Marjolaine's appearance in Origins is conditional upon Leliana's approval with the Warden; a high approval rating unlocks her personal quest.

== Supporting characters ==
=== Duncan ===
Voiced by: Peter Renaday

Duncan is the narrator of the opening cinematic in Origins and leader of the Grey Wardens in Ferelden. He is seen recruiting the player character to join the Wardens under six different scenarios, and serves as their mentor early in the game. He inducts the player character into the Grey Wardens, before perishing shortly afterwards at the battle of Ostagar. Duncan also appears in The Calling, where he and his fellow Grey Wardens first encountered The Architect, a uniquely sentient Darkspawn mage who presents himself as different from the rest of his kind in that he has free will, and that his goal is to release the Darkspawn race from the compulsion to search for the Old Gods by any means necessary.

IGN's Christian Holt noted that the death of Duncan is particularly painful because "no matter what origin story you went with, he played a role as a steady but firm hand that not only saved your life, but initiated you into the Grey Wardens".

=== Cullen ===
Voiced by: Greg Ellis

Cullen is a Ferelden member of the Templar Order. Cullen may be encountered three times in Origins. In the Mage Origin, he is the templar assigned to execute the player character if they were to fail their Harrowing and become an abomination. If the Warden is a female mage, Cullen will reveal his infatuation with her, as he hated the idea of having to be the one to potentially execute her. He will be found once again as the last surviving templar in the upper levels of the Circle Tower during the Broken Circle quest. When the Warden meets him trapped inside a magical prison, he dismisses the Warden as another illusion. Once Cullen has calmed down, he will attempt to convince the Warden to kill all the mages in the Harrowing Chamber, not just the villainous Uldred and the abominations, as he fears they may be blood mages in hiding. The Warden, upon defeating the last of the demons, has a choice to either pardon the surviving mages, or kill all of them to prevent the worst from happening yet again. Before the Warden ascends to the final floor, Cullen implores them to choose the second option. The third time is immediately after that choice is made, where Cullen expresses his opinion on said choice.

=== Flemeth ===
Voiced by: Kate Mulgrew

Flemeth is the legendary "Witch of the Wilds", an ancient, transcendent and apparently immortal shape-shifting mage affecting the appearance of an eccentric old woman or a high dragon depending on the situation. At the start of the game, she returns a set of ancient Grey Warden treaties to the Warden's party and offers them advice for their future. She later rescues the Warden and Alistair from Ostagar, and commands her daughter Morrigan to accompany them on their subsequent journeys. As part of Morrigan's personal quest, the Warden may choose to attack Flemeth and fight her in her High Dragon form, or simply allowing her to leave in peace and take her grimoire.

=== Queen Anora ===
Voiced by: Mika Simmons

Anora Theirin (née Mac Tir) is the current Queen Consort of Ferelden and Loghain's daughter. Unlike her husband, Anora is a heavy player in politics and wants to protect the kingdom and its people, though it is clear she believes herself entitled to the position of Queen. When Loghain takes over the kingdom and appoints himself as regent, she supports him at first. However, after witnessing his disastrous and paranoid political choices, she starts doubting him and confronts him about Cailan's death. After learning that her father left Cailan to die at Ostagar on purpose, thus triggering the Ferelden civil war and leaving the nation extremely vulnerable to the Darkspawn Blight, she opposes her father but is kidnapped by Arl Rendon Howe to prevent her involvement at the Landsmeet. After the Warden rescues her, Anora will support the Grey Warden against her father during the Landsmeet as long as her position as Queen of Ferelden is secured by supporting her right to rule, either as queen regnant, as Alistair's queen or by marrying a male Warden if he is a Human Noble. If Anora is deposed, her fate is not revealed.

=== Bodahn and Sandal Feddic ===
Voiced by: Dwight Schultz and Yuri Lowenthal

Bodahn Feddic is a surface dwarf merchant, who is assisted by his adopted son, Sandal. In Origins, Bodahn and Sandal are rescued by the Warden from Darkspawn upon leaving Lothering, after which they will offer their services along to the Ferelden Grey Wardens. He provides a venue at the party camp through which to sell and buy goods. According to Bodahn, Sandal may be lyrium-addled due to his possible exposure to lyrium in the Deep Roads. He also claims that the Circle of Magi declared Sandal a savant and may have desired to keep Sandal for study or in order to enchant for them. Sandal excels at enchanting and runecrafting; he is, however, unable to care for himself and has a limited mental capacity for common tasks, such as conversation where he usually replies with one-word answers. Prior to the Battle of Denerim, Bodahn and Sandal can be found Redcliffe Castle to assist with any final preparations before the Warden travels to Denerim. Sandal will next be encountered at Fort Drakon by himself, surrounded by dead Darkspawn and covered in blood. When asked what happened, he will simply say, "Enchantment?".

=== Bann Teagan Guerrin ===
Voiced by: Timothy Watson

Teagan Guerrin is the bann of Rainsfere and Eamon's younger brother. He is the brother of Arl Eamon Guerrin, and the uncle to King Cailan Theirin. Immediately after the battle at Ostagar, Teagan is shown confronting Loghain Mac Tir at the Landsmeet, highly suspicious of Loghain's self-appointment as regent after his withdrawal from Ostagar. When the Warden arrives in Redcliffe Village, it is besieged by undead hordes, and its ruler Arl Eamon is locked away in his own castle nearby, with no word from it at all. Bann Teagan is in charge of the village's defense, and he pleads with the Warden to help them defend the village. Once the Urn of Andraste is found and Eamon recovers, Teagan stays with his brother at Redcliffe Castle. Later, Eamon orders Teagan to stay with the Redcliffe garrison while he and the Warden go to participate in the Battle of Denerim. He later arrives with reinforcements and was not far behind the main body of the Fereldan army when the Archdemon perishes at Fort Drakon, and leads a final attack on the routed Darkspawn as the horde flees Denerim.

=== Arl Eamon Guerrin ===
Voiced by: Graham McTavish

Eamon Guerrin is the Arl of Redcliffe, husband of Arlessa Isolde, brother of Bann Teagan, and father of Connor Guerrin. He is first mentioned in Lothering as deathly sick from an incurable illness; in truth, he has been poisoned by an assassin of Loghain's. He is also the maternal uncle of King Cailan and therefore Alistair. He is later revived by the Warden by giving him the Urn of Sacred Ashes and becomes instrumental in helping the Warden rally support for his cause, both against Loghain at the Landsmeet and the Darkspawn.

=== Riordan ===
Voiced by: Stéphane Cornicard

Riordan is an Orlesian Grey Warden who was sent as an advance scout by the Orlesian support forces when they were turned away by Loghain. Riordan was a friend of Duncan, having gone through their Joining together. Riordan plays a pivotal role by revealing that an Archdemon is only slain permanently by a Grey Warden who makes the ultimate sacrifice, and later assisting the Warden with planning for the final assault against the Archdemon and its hordes. During the final battle in Denerim, he confronts the Archdemon alone and succeeds in wounding it enough to give the Warden a chance to slay it, though Riordan perishes before he can join the final fight.

=== Seneschal Varel ===
Voiced by: Robin Sachs

Varel is the Seneschal of Vigil's Keep. When the Grey Wardens took over Amaranthine, they appointed Varel as Seneschal. He is privy to many secrets of the order, despite not being a Grey Warden himself. He is first encountered in Origins - Awakening during the opening quest to regain Vigil's Keep, being held on the roof of the keep by the Withered, an awakened Darkspawn who has gained full sentience and follows the Architect. Following his rescue by the Warden-Commander, Varel runs the day-to-day operations of Vigil's Keep. He can be found in the throne room of the Vigil where he keeps the Warden-Commander informed of the political events that are taking place in the arling. He is also in charge of the Joining ritual for each of the Warden-Commander's companions.

== Other characters ==
- Brother Genitivi is a Chantry scholar and expert on the Urn of Sacred Ashes; he is based in Denerim during the events of Origins. His writings are quoted in numerous codex entries found throughout the game.
- Connor Guerrin is the son of Arl Eamon and Arlessa Isolde. Possessed by a Desire Demon shortly before the arrival of the Warden in Redcliffe Village, he seizes control of Redcliffe Castle and unleashing an undead horde that soon began attacking the village. If Connor survives the events of Origins and is no longer demon-possessed, he appears in Redcliffe Village in Dragon Age: Inquisition.
- First Enchanter Irving is the First Enchanter of the Ferelden Circle of Magi, based in Kinloch Hold. Depending on player choice, Irving and the Circle Mages may be recruited for the Battle of Denerim.
- Jowan is a fugitive apostate and blood mage on the run from the templars. He is first encountered as a temporary companion of the Warden during the Mage Origin story. He is later recruited by Loghain, and assigned to infiltrate Redcliffe Castle and poison Arl Eamon on his behest.
- Kardol is a high-ranking member of the Legion of the Dead. Depending on player choice, Kardol and his legionnaires may be recruited for the Battle of Denerim.
- King Cailan Theirin is the king of Ferelden at the start of Origins. He is killed by an Ogre at the battle of Ostagar toward the beginning of the game. The DLC, Return to Ostagar, involves the Warden dealing with Cailan's corpse and belongings from the battlefield, and also reveals insight that may have contributed to Loghain's betrayal of Cailan.
- Knight-Commander Greagoir is the Knight-Commander of Ferelden's Templar Order, responsible for watching over the Circle of Magi based in Kinloch Hold. Depending on player choice, Greagoir and his templars may be recruited for the Battle of Denerim.
- Lady of the Forest: A mysterious spirit who guides the werewolves living in the Brecilian Forest.
- Lord Pyral Harrowmont is a High-General of Orzammar, and King Endrin Aeducan's friend and confidant. He is one of two major contenders claiming the throne of Orzammar after the death of King Endrin.
- Mhairi is a temporary companion who serves as the Warden-Commander's escort to Vigil's Keep in the beginning of Awakening. She is a Ferelden warrior who is recently recruited to the Wardens but has yet to undertake the Joining. After Vigil's Keep is secured, she will partake in the Joining, but does not survive the process.
- Paragon Branka is a contemporary Paragon from Orzammar and Oghren's estranged wife. She is searching for the long lost Anvil of the Void, a powerful artifact which can be used to create golems. The Warden will have to choose between siding with her or Paragon Caridin, the creator of the Anvil who opposes its use.
- Prince Bhelen Aeducan is the third child of King Endrin Aeducan, member of the Council of Dwarves, and also younger brother to a Dwarf Noble Warden. He is the main rival to Pyral Harrowmont's claim to the throne of Orzammar after the death of his father.
- Rica Brosca is the casteless mistress of Prince Bhelen, and the half-sister of the Dwarf Commoner, one of six potential candidates for the Warden. Both work for Beraht, the Carta crime boss.
- Swiftrunner is the leader of the werewolves living in the Brecilian Forest. Depending on player choice, Swiftrunner and his pack of werewolves may be recruited as allies for the Battle of Denerim.
- Wade and Herren are the co-owners of Wade's Emporium in Denerim City. Wade is a master smith who specializes in handling rare and exotic crafting materials, while Herren runs the business.
- Zathrian is the supposedly-immortal Keeper of a clan of Dalish Elves living near the Brecilian Forest. He recruits the Warden's party to eliminate a pack of werewolves and their leader, Witherfang to undo a curse. Depending on player choice, Zathrian's clan may be recruited as allies for the Battle of Denerim and/or he may be succeeded as Keeper of his clan by his apprentice, Lanaya.

== Reception and analysis ==
The Dragon Age series is notable for its varied depiction of LGBT characters, being one of the few video game franchises which feature a non-tokenistic portrayal of openly queer characters. The series feature the relationships of openly queer characters as important to the narrative, and also openly depict same-sex couples engaging in sexual activity, starting with Origins. Same-sex relationships appears to be largely free of stigmatization by society and are consistently nuanced in its depiction; for example, neither Leliana nor Zevran, the bisexual love interests in Origins, are portrayed with clichéd stereotypes like the butch lesbian, the flamboyant gay man, or the tragic gay. (Note: A homosexual character often killed at the end of the narrative, or sentenced to live alone after the death(s) of their lover or friends, as defined by Kate Reynolds in her essay titled Conventions of Fantasy: Sex and Relationships in Dragon Age: Origins published in the anthology book titled Popular Culture in the Twenty-First Century.) The same-sex relationships with Leliana and Zevran are depicted as stable and revolve around love as opposed to sex, and neither relationship leads to a tragic end unless the player sacrifices their Warden at the game's ending.

== Bibliography ==
- Dragon Age: The World of Thedas, Volume 1. Milwaukie, Oregon: Dark Horse Books. April 2013. ISBN 978-1-61655-115-5.
- Dragon Age: The World of Thedas, Volume 2. Milwaukie, Oregon: Dark Horse Books. May 2015. ISBN 978-161655-501-6.
