= Leliana =

Fictional character

- Dragon Age character
- Render of Leliana based on her character design from the Sacred Ashes promotional trailer for Dragon Age: Origins.
- First appearance: Dragon Age: Origins (2009)
- Voiced by: Corinne Kempa

In-universe information
- Class: Rogue
- Specialization: Bard

Leliana is a fictional character from BioWare's Dragon Age media franchise, first appearing as a party member in the 2009 role-playing game Dragon Age: Origins. A bard who is originally from the nation of Orlais, she came to Ferelden prior to the events of the Dragon Age series. Following the events of Leliana's Song, a DLC pack which serves as a prequel to the base game, she encounters the surviving Grey Wardens of Ferelden in the town of Lothering, and accompanies them to stop the monstrous Darkspawn from overrunning the world of Thedas. Leliana has appeared as a supporting character in subsequent video game sequels to Origins as well as other expanded media. She is voiced by French actress Corinne Kempa.

Leliana is generally well received. The character was featured prominently in promotional material and advertisements released by Bioware's parent company EA leading up to the release of Dragon Age: Origins and Dragon Age: Inquisition.

== Concept and design ==
Leliana is conceived as a devout and religious layperson from Orlais, a human empire which is culturally inspired by Renaissance-era France. She used to work as a bard, a type of musician who often undertakes work on the side as assassins and spies for patrons in her homeland's games of intrigue. Due to the nature of her profession as a professional storyteller, the developers considered Leliana to be a natural fit as the protagonist of the DLC that would become Leliana's Song, which explores Leliana's past and how she came to the Kingdom of Ferelden in detail.

Leliana's video game appearances are written by Sheryl Chee. According to Chee, while she has a good grasp of their arc and personality, her characters’ voices do not really establish themselves firmly until she has written a few conversations around them as part of her creative process. Chee described her playlist when writing for Leliana to be generally dominated by feminine voices, its tone "sweetly melancholic, with occasional moments of self-indulgent gloom and anger". For Leliana's iteration in Inquisition, Chee said she is no longer a "carefree, optimistic youngster", as she has a lot of responsibilities to bear as the Left Hand of the Divine following the events of Origins. Chee explained that though Leliana's role in Inquisition was "a little tricky" to handle because of how she could be affected by a player's choices from Origins, she made sure that the character's core nature is respected and that she remains true to herself regardless of what happened to her, while also making sense with the role she plays within the story of Inquisition. Chee noted that the events depicted in the previously released novels, Asunder and Masked Empire, have also contributed to Leliana's backstory for Inquisition.

Former Dragon Age project director Mike Laidlaw described her iteration in Inquisition as a character who is somewhat morally ambiguous; depending on the player's choice to influence her in Inquisition, her outlook may either "soften" and become "a joyful note amid a lot of darkness", or become even more hardened. Laidlaw noted that she ultimately is "capable of incredible resilience despite hardship", as she had grown from the naive and inexperienced young woman in Leliana's Song to someone who has mastered her field of expertise but remains fundamentally optimistic in Inquisition, even though she understands what is happening in the wider world. To Laidlaw, Leliana character's arc and the iterations of her personality represents the turbulent developmental history of the Dragon Age intellectual property as recounted in an interview with Eurogamer.

As the Inquisition's "ruthless spymaster" who handles the organization's covert operations, the character has to present herself in a certain way for the organization's sake. Her armor is redesigned and streamlined to "evoke maximum intrigue", while her scarf hood communicates two sides of her character: the devout believer and the rogue. Leliana wears an ashen purple hood to help obscure her face, and her choice of armor reflects her need to remain discreet and incongruous. Her leather tunic is lined with chain mail mesh, which affords essential protection with no compromise on mobility. She wears plate greaves and leg guards to protect herself from low swinging blows. The heraldry of the Inquisition, displayed on the front of her tunic, serves to remind the organization's opponents that "their secrets are never safe".

Leliana's face in Dragon Age: Origins is based on an adult model named Alleykatze. In a 2010 interview, French actress Corinne Kempa considered Leliana to be her biggest video game role to date. Kempa described Leliana as a "mix of strength and vulnerability, sexy at times, and also has a sense of humor. According to Kempa, to competently perform voice work in a video game means having to be able to simulate talking to someone or respond to a hypothetical situation and emotion, all the while being led by a voice director who puts the sentences she is asked to verbalize within the appropriate emotional context.

== Appearances ==
Early on in Origins, Leliana is encountered in the Ferelden village of Lothering as an optional party member. She introduces herself as a lay sister of the Andrastrian Chantry, and after breaking up a brawl at the local tavern, she insists on joining the Ferelden Wardens after receiving what she believes was a vision from the Maker, the deity venerated by the Chantry. She is bisexual, and thus a possible romance option for both male and female player characters. Leliana is highly religious and believes in doing the right thing. This means if the player-controlled Warden chooses to commit a morally reprehensible act like defiling the fabled Urn of Sacred Ashes, she may attack the Warden and die in the attempt. Leliana continues to appear in the Dragon Age series regardless of her fate in Origins. Leliana's personal quest involves dealing with Marjolaine, her old mentor and lover. Leliana is the protagonist of the Origins DLC Leliana's Song, a prequel to the main campaign for Origins which details her complicated past and her pivotal meeting with Mother Dorothea, who is eventually appointed as Divine Justinia V within series lore.

Leliana appears in a cameo appearance at the ending of Dragon Age II, where she confers with her colleague Cassandra Pentaghast following the conclusion of the latter's interrogation of Varric Tethras. In The Exiled Prince DLC pack, she is encountered by Hawke's party at the Viscount's Keep in Kirkwall. Revealing herself as Sister Nightingale, a special agent who is known as the Left Hand of the Divine, she asks Hawke to persuade Grand Cleric Elthina to flee the city out of concern for her safety. In the Mark of the Assassin DLC, Leliana makes a brief appearance at the estate of the Orlesian nobleman Prosper de Montfort, where she appears to be well-acquainted with the Qunari spy Tallis.

In Dragon Age: Inquisition, Leliana is appointed as the organization's spymaster who deals in secrets and is quick to move amongst the shadows when diplomacy fails and when a deft touch is needed instead. She is presented as "suspicious and deliberate" who carefully chooses her allies to protect against betrayal and deception, and someone who is emotionally hardened due to her time working as an agent of the Divine due to her many enemies. If a world state is configured where Leliana had a relationship with the Hero of Ferelden during the events of Origins, this will be acknowledged within in-game dialogue. Leliana is depicted as having become ruthless and unforgiving due to experiencing a crisis of faith following the untimely death of Divine Justinia V. the Inquisitor has the option of accepting her emergent personality, or attempt to reach the idealistic part of her seen in Origins. Mid-way through Inquisition's narrative, Leliana will emerge as a potential candidate for election as the next Divine of the Andrastrian Chantry, potentially succeeding Justinia V as Divine Victoria.

=== In other media ===
In the 2011 novel Dragon Age: Asunder, Leliana is presented as an agent of Divine Justinia V who attempts to mediate between the warring Mage and Templar factions. She later participates in a raid on the White Spire to free some captive mages, but her presence convinces the Templar Order that Divine Justinia is conspiring against them. In the 2014 novel Dragon Age: The Masked Empire, Leliana appears as an envoy to Empress Celene on behalf of Divine Justinia V. Among the topics of discussion between the characters include the ongoing Mage-Templar War, as well as a rebellion led by elves in the city of Halamshiral.

Leliana makes a brief appearance in the 2015 comic book miniseries Dragon Age: Magekiller. She assigns Dorian Pavus and the Bull's Chargers on a mission to help the main characters of Magekiler, Marius and Tessa Forsythia, defeat the Venatori. She greets them upon their return to Caer Bronach, an old Ferelden military outpost in the Crestwood area.

== Critical reception ==
Leliana is described by GamesRadar as a popular and well received companion character. Kimberley Wallace described her as a wild card and her return in the then-upcoming Inquisition to be most exciting, as her motivations and true loyalties are shrouded in an aura of mystery. In an article written in commemoration of International Women’s Day 2020, Jamie Sharp from Power Up Gaming praised Leliana for representing the virtue of strength and persistence, who has been through a lot of opposition and struggles in her life and yet retains her semblance of self and eventually becomes "the person she wants to be". On the other hand, Charles Onyett from IGN took the view that Leliana was hardly the most compelling character from the Dragon Age universe. Hayley Williams from Kotaku did not find her change in personality from Origins to Inquisition convincing and called her accent "terrible".

The presentation of Leliana's romance arc in Origins has been of some interest to commentators. In her essay published by the 2015 book Game Love: Essays on Play and Affection, Annika Waern discussed Leliana along with the other romanceable characters of Origins within the context of the "bleed" concept, an emotional transfer between the player-controlled character and a non-player character; during the course of her research where she examined player feedback to the romance options, Waern found that Leliana is written to fall in love and maintains her feelings for the player character throughout Origins with equal ease in comparison to the other characters. Nathan Grayson from Kotaku was drawn to the game's even-handedness on religion as a subject, and to Leliana as a romance option since he could relate to her on the topics of "faith, the nature of it, and how much good it had done for her". The potential same sex relationship between her and the player character is noted for its stability, revolves around love as opposed to sex, and does not lead to a tragic end unless the player sacrifices their player character at the game's ending. Corin Bae from TheGamer credits her experience of replaying Origins in 2017 and interacting with Leliana for aiding her to come to terms with her traumatic personal experiences. She believes that the greatest thing she took away from experiencing Leliana's story, is "the willingness to let myself want".

For her work as Leliana in Inquisition, Corinne Kempa was nominated for the Supporting Performance In A Drama award for the National Academy of Video Game Trade Reviewers' 14th annual awards program honoring video game art, technology, and production in 2015.
