= Mike Laidlaw =

Canadian video game developer

- Occupation: Game developer
- Known for: Jade Empire; Dragon Age series Eternal Strands

Mike Laidlaw is a Canadian video game developer best known for his work at BioWare as the creative director for the Dragon Age fantasy role-playing video game franchise, and the lead designer and director on the first three games.

== Early life ==
Laidlaw grew up on a dairy farm. His parents bought him a Commodore 64 when he was seven years old, and he found himself creating his own levels in Lode Runner, leading his parents to buy him a disk drive to support his passion. His favourite games before entering the game industry were Star Control II, Wasteland, and Neuromancer. He later described Star Control II as his favourite game of all time. Laidlaw earned a Bachelor of Arts in English from the University of Western Ontario.

== Career ==
Laidlaw reviewed video games at The Adrenaline Vault for three years. His early career included working at Bell Canada working in their call centre, eventually leading a team before he quit. Soon after, he applied for a job at BioWare after seeing an advertisement for a writing position.

Mike Laidlaw joined BioWare in 2003. Working on the action role-playing game Jade Empire, he was promoted to co-lead writer after one year due to his ability to organize other writers. He was ultimately credited as the lead story developer and designer when it was released in 2005. He then became a writer on Mass Effect. Working under Drew Karpyshyn, he contributed writing to several pieces of the game, including two locations and three alien races. He briefly worked on a prototype for a sequel to Jade Empire before the project was cancelled.

Laidlaw's next role was lead designer for Dragon Age: Origins. The core game design had been implemented, but the writing needed improvement to make it into a viable series. His work earned him a nomination for a British Academy Video Games Award for Best Story in 2010 (with BioWare cofounders Ray Muzyka and Greg Zeschuk). His success on Dragon Age earned him a promotion to creative director and then senior creative director for the franchise. However, Laidlaw credits other writers for coming up with the series lore and detail, including Dave Gaider and Ben Gelinas. Laidlaw participated extensively in promotional efforts for Dragon Age II, where he has been interviewed about developmental information for the sequel to Origins. Laidlaw was the director for an unreleased fourth entry in the Dragon Age series, code-named Joplin, before the project was cancelled to reallocate staff to Anthem's development. As the fourth Dragon Age project was rebooted under the code name Morrison, Laidlaw and several veteran Dragon Age staff decided to leave the company. Laidlaw formally announced his departure on October 13, 2017. Laidlaw felt this was the right time to minimize any disruptions to the development, and left the project in the hands of producer Mark Darrah.

In 2018, Laidlaw joined Ubisoft Quebec as creative director on an unspecified project. He ultimately left the company in early 2020 after 14 months. Later, details surfaced that Laidlaw worked on a now-cancelled project codenamed Avalon, based on the fantasy of King Arthur and the Knights of the Round Table. The project faced conflicting visions with UbiSoft's Chief Creative Officer Serge Hascoët over the setting and themes. By late 2020, Laidlaw announced he was forming a new indie game studio called Yellow Brick Games, at which he serves as chief creative officer. The studio's debut title, Eternal Strands, was revealed in April 2024.
