= Nuclear Strike (Spooks) =

- Spooks episode
- Episode no.: Series 7 Episode 8
- Directed by: Sam Miller
- Written by: Neil Cross
- Original air date: 8 December 2008
- Running time: 59 minutes

Guest appearances
- Kevin Fuller as Walter Crane; Kenneth Bryans as George Redman; Robert Glenister as Nicholas Blake; Anastasia Hille as Marina Connolly; Peter Sullivan as Viktor Sarkisiian; Michael Klesic as Andre Borodin; Charlotte Pyke as Komorov; Amelda Brown as Bag Lady

Episode chronology
← Previous "The Mole"	Next → "Series 8, Episode 1"
- Spooks series 7

"Nuclear Strike" is the series 7 finale and 64th episode of the British espionage television series Spooks. It was originally broadcast on BBC One on 8 December 2008. The episode was written by Neil Cross, and directed by Sam Miller. In the episode, Tiresias, the Russian equivalent of Sugarhorse, awakens a sleeper agent to detonate a nuclear suitcase bomb in central London. The Section D team use Connie James (Gemma Jones), an FSB mole who helped set up Tiresias, to help them stop the bomb. However, the team find themselves targeted by an FSB kill squad, who are unaware of the bomb threat.

The idea behind the episode came from an earlier series three episode about a series of Russian weapons caches throughout the United Kingdom set up during the Cold War. Cross also felt it gratifying to kill off Connie, a character he created in the sixth series. Filming took place during the summer of 2008, with much of it taking place in disused tunnels of the London Underground. The series seven finale was seen by six million viewers and a quarter of the television audience, a large increase of 900,000 viewers and four share points from the previous week. Critics reacted to the episode with near universal acclaim, for being a "superb season closer", "exciting" and "thrilling".

== Plot ==
In Faversham, Kent, Walter Crane (Kevin Fuller) receives the message "rain from heaven" in Russian from a numbers station. Upon hearing this, Crane unburies a cache. Section D, having heard "Tiresias wakes 3 pm tomorrow" the previous episode, work on what the message means. Lucas North (Richard Armitage) and Harry Pearce (Peter Firth) discover Tiresias is the Russian equivalent of Sugarhorse, but "bigger and better;" while Sugarhorse placed pro-western Russians to infiltrate its government, Tiresias does the opposite; recruit spies to infiltrate the British Government. Ros Myers (Hermione Norris) believes Connie James (Gemma Jones), a mole from the FSB, might know what Tiresias is planning. Ros and Lucas release Connie from custody by posing as masked Russian agents. Later, it is revealed that FSB officers have been assigned to assassinate her. FSB head Viktor Sarkisiian (Peter Sullivan) orders a kill squad to search every MI5 safehouse, provided by Connie, to kill her and the Section D team who are harbouring her.

At the safe house "Ottawa Bravo", Connie reveals she helped set up Tiresias over two decades ago and will give all sleeper agents and operations in exchange for safe passage to New Zealand. After listening to the numbers station broadcast, she reveals Tiresias has awakened a sleeper agent to a specific task; detonating a nuclear suitcase bomb in central London by 3 pm. The only way to know where it would detonate is a locker at London Bridge station, which contain all Tiresias members and codes. When they start their journey however, they encounter the kill squad. They and Lucas engage in a shootout, and after evading them, the team decide to split up and regroup in Catherine Wheel Alley, while Harry returns to Thames House.

After returning, Harry warns Home Secretary Nicholas Blake (Robert Glenister) of the threat and tells him that if he receives a call from MI5 at 2:45 pm, he should order the evacuation of Parliament. Lucas, Ros and Connie regroup and head towards a London Underground station, but Lucas is wounded by a sniper; though not seriously wounded, the kill squad could follow Lucas' blood trail. To slow them down, Lucas sets up rudimentary traps and the three venture through empty tunnels towards the station. Later, the kill squad send in a runner to find the three; Lucas is able to trip and kill him. Back in Thames House, Harry believes the FSB are not aware of the bomb threat, and decides to meet with Sarkisiian face-to-face. In order to get there alive, Harry uses the emergency "handshake protocols" and reasons with Sarkisiian that he would turn himself into the FSB if he stops the kill squad. Meanwhile, Lucas attempts to draw off the squad by splitting up, but at the confrontation, his gun jams and is cornered. Before he can be killed, Sarkisiian calls the team off and orders them to help stop the bomb.

Ros and Connie find the locker with the bomber's name and location, Grosvenor Square. An FSB sniper kills Crane, and at Connie's request, the bomb is sent to her, as she is the only person with the expertise to disarm it. Connie defuses the bomb, but by doing so a secondary countdown is initiated. While seemingly experiencing an episode of mania or insanity, she removes the nuclear material before calmly describing the device as “just a bomb”, as the uranium is no longer present and that she isn't scared of them, but it will still detonate in her face as she is the one disarming it. In her last words, Connie admits that she set up Lucas in Moscow eight years ago, which resulted in his imprisonment. Lucas and Ros then run to safety as the bomb detonates, killing Connie. With disaster averted, Lucas calls Harry, but receives no answer. In the end, it is revealed Sarkisiian has him locked up in the boot of his car.

== Production ==
=== Writing ===
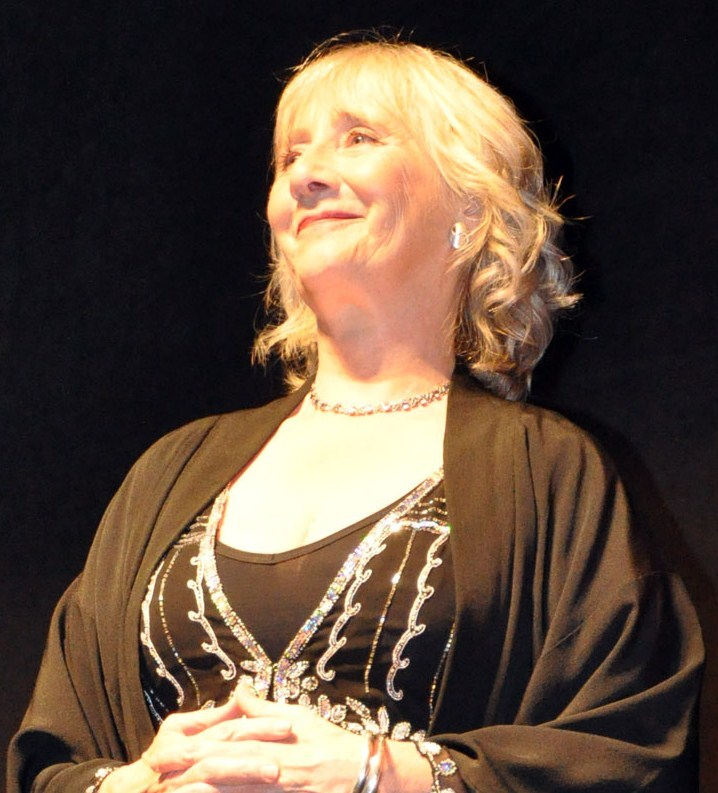
Neil Cross liked killing off Connie James, portrayed by Gemma Jones (pictured), a character he created in the sixth series.

The episode was written by Neil Cross. Before he started writing Cross did not know Connie was the mole from the previous episode, so he included it to help with the storyline. The character was originally intended to be killed by the end of the last episode, but Cross kept her alive until the end of the finale. He wanted her killed off at this episode, as he was the one who created Connie in the sixth series, and felt it gratifying to kill off a character he created. In writing the plot, Cross was inspired by the Rupert Walters script for "Frequently Asked Questions" from the third series, which revealed a series of weapons caches throughout the United Kingdom set up by the Russians during the Cold War; Cross wanted to use that as a way to introduce the nuclear suitcase bomb. The bombs design from the episode was based from actual designs, but invented its failsafes.

The producers also intended to tease the audience that after the brutal killing of Ben Kaplan (Alex Lanipekun) from the previous episode, they would think that things could not get worse for the team, until the nuclear threat in the finale. The scene where the team breaks Connie out was intended to show the audience that the protagonists are willing to go to extreme measures to stop serious threats. Cross wanted to make it a very pure Spooks episode by setting up the entire plot in one scene, and then include a chase throughout London between FSB officers and the main characters. Cross enjoyed creating the FSB team featured in the episode, especially as he created them as a Russian version of the Spooks protagonists, but also make their base much more lit with windows. The bomb defusal scene was originally set at a graveyard, but the producers decided it would be best to set it underground. Though it took several rewrites, the script remained "fundamentally the same" throughout the writing process.

The part where Connie asks for safe passage to New Zealand was a "sly personal reference" to Cross, as the writer himself resides in the country. In one scene, Lucas can be seen breaking into a car and getting his hands on various items that would be useful to help set up traps against the FSB officers. Throughout the episode's development, the items kept changing. There were also staff discussions about what they could get away with in terms of the protagonists killing FSB officers. The most prominent discussions included Harry strangling one officer with his necktie, and Lucas shooting another in the head in cold blood despite being unarmed and subdued.

=== Casting ===
Kevin Fuller was cast as Walter Crane, the man with the bomb. The character did not say a word throughout the entirety of the episode, yet had such a strong presence, which the producers felt was unique for a guest star in the series. Fuller did "a lot of getting into the part," director Sam Miller felt that Fuller was one of the most influential actors he ever worked with. Elsewhere, Peter Sullivan, who plays Sarkisiian, never spoke Russian before. Since most of his dialogue would be in Russian, Sullivan was trained how to speak it phonetically before he would play the part.

=== Filming ===
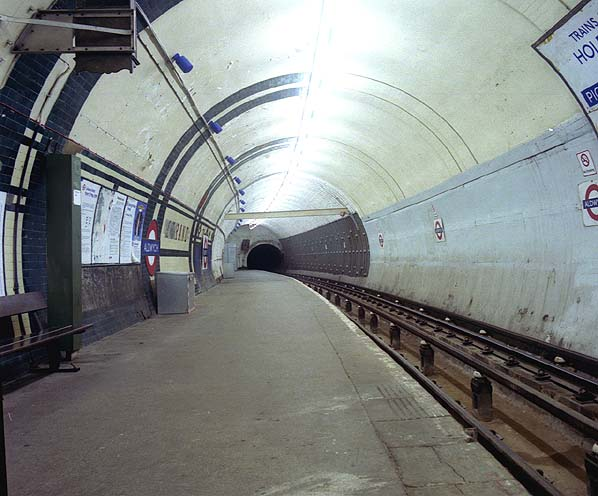
Five days of filming took place in the disused tunnels of the London Underground.

The episode was filmed sometime during Summer 2008. Miller wanted to style the filming as if the cameras are following the team like in a documentary. The first day was spent in the "Ottawa Bravo" safe house set, where Connie reveals the threat. Throughout the shoot, Gemma Jones had hip problems. Concerned, the producers set up a body double on hand. However, Jones insisted she could do everything herself, and in the end the double was not used. During the first shootout scene in the episode, Miller wanted to make the sequence as real as possible by having the camera film as if it was under attack. Richard Armitage recalled the shootout sequence; "There was a shoot-out in the final episode where I surprised myself about the amount of rounds I could pull off and how quickly. It's a weird thing. I'm not a violent person but when you put a gun in somebody's hands something strange happens. It's like a little animal comes out of you that wants to fire the gun again."

Filming did face some disruptions. The sequence where Lucas breaks into a car for some supplies was filmed at a street near Hyde Park. On one end of the street was an event in the park, while on the other end a wedding took place. Elsewhere, Fuller carried a mock-suitcase bomb to film in Grosvenor Square. However, because the American Embassy is situated next to the square, shortly after Fuller and the filming crew arrived, they found themselves surrounded by five armed American security officers who believed Fuller was about to commit an attack. Fortunately, location manager Patrick Stuart was able to "sweet-talk" the American officials, and they were allowed to film in the area.

Five days of filming were spent at the London Underground tunnels. Filming took place on actual tube tunnels, albeit disused ones. As the crew were scouting the disused Aldwych tunnels, they found the ex-Northern line 1972 stock train stabled in the tunnel for maintenance, training, and filming purposes. When Sam Miller called Cross about the development, the writer included it as a last minute addition to the script, and the sequence was shot the next day. As a way to scare the audience, Cross included a homeless woman living in the train. The filming crew present disliked filming the Underground sequences because while filmed during the summer, it became hot locations to work in. The crew were prohibited from bringing food or drink into the tunnels, as it would attract rats. Furthermore, break times had to be longer than usual because it would take a while for a crew member to leave the tunnels, have a break and then return. The FSB base was filmed in the London Docklands, near the ExCeL London, at 1000 Dockside Rd, London E16 2QU.

== Cultural references ==
Though the series in general does not note many cultural references, Neil Cross decided to include some into this particular episode. The phrases "rain from heaven" and "it is twice blest" from the numbers station was taken from "The Quality of Mercy" speech from the William Shakespeare play The Merchant of Venice. The speech begins; "The quality of mercy is not strain'd, it droppeth as the gentle rain from heaven. Upon the place beneath: it is twice blest; it blesseth him that gives and him that takes..."

The coded message ( "2.5.0.0.2.5. Finland Red, Egypt White. It is twice blest. It is twice blest. Rain from Heaven") also contains several references to the 1986 album Gift by The Sisterhood. "Finland Red, Egypt White" and "Rain From Heaven" are titles of songs on this album, and the first track "Jihad" begins with the words "two-five-zero-zero-zero".

Later in the episode, Lucas tells Connie about Bridget Driscoll, the first person in the United Kingdom to be run over and killed by a car, which, while big news back in her time, becomes forgotten over time and is now only "a single moment," much like Connie's contributions to her country during the Cold War. When Jo asks Malcolm to evacuate his mother, he explains she is busy watching A Place in the Sun, a television programme about Britons buying property abroad, followed by Countdown, a game show on Channel 4.

== Broadcast and reception ==
The episode was originally broadcast on BBC One, during the 9 pm to 10 pm time slot on Monday, 8 December 2008. However, it was held back to 10:40 pm in Northern Ireland, and did not broadcast in Scotland on the day all together. The finale attracted 6 million viewers on its original broadcast, earning a 25% audience share. Ratings were up by 900,000 viewers and four share points from the previous episode which aired against I'm a Celebrity, Get, Me Out of Here! on ITV1. On the next week, the Spooks finale beat Taggart on ITV1 in the same time slot. "Nuclear Strike" ended being the ninth most seen broadcast on BBC One, and the 24th most seen broadcast overall the week it aired.

The episode attracted near universal acclaim. The Spooks producers regard "Nuclear Strike" as one of their favourites in the series. Sam Wollaston of The Guardian reacted positively to the episode, stating "it's nice to see MI5 locking horns with the Russians again. Maybe the Spooks people just got bored with Islamic terrorism, so they did what they had to do: they restarted the cold war. A bold move, but an admirable one." Gerard O'Donovan of The Daily Telegraph placed the episode as a "critic's choice," calling it a "superb season closer," and "all terrifically exciting." O'Donovan also said of the episode's settings; "the streets and Underground tunnels of London have rarely been used to such climactic effect – with great performances from everyone involved." He also complimented it for setting up a "great cliffhanger ending that will leave fans absolutely gagging for the next series."

Andrew Billen of The Times however, felt the finale was "not [a] very exciting episode," and "conducted with a minimum of acting." Mof Gimmers of TV Scoop praised the episode, saying "Neil Cross knows a thing or two about ratcheting up the tension, and in the finale of the seventh series of Spooks he used both of them. And then, from somewhere, he found a third thing. And a fourth," and "pressure piled on pressure relentlessly throughout this brilliant finale as each new success only led to the next, even bigger problem." Gimmers called the chase sequence in the episode "one of the most thrilling traditional chase sequences ever seen on British TV," the interplay between the characters "was handled expertly," and ended with "already I can't wait for the next series!"
