= On the Brink (Spooks) =

- Spooks episode
- Episode no.: Series 7 Episode 5
- Directed by: Edward Hall
- Written by: Christian Spurrier
- Original air dates: 10 November 2008 (BBC Three); 17 November 2008 (BBC One)
- Running time: 58 minutes

Guest appearances
- Selina Cadell as Gillian Calderwood; Simon Williams as Francis Denham; Paul Rhys as Alexis Meynell; Stephen Noonan as Asa Darlek; Gus Gallagher as Boscard; Paloma Baeza as Elizabeta Starkova

Episode chronology
← Previous "A Chance for Peace"	Next → "Accidental Discovery"
- Spooks series 7

"On the Brink" is the fifth episode of series seven of the British espionage television series Spooks, and the 60th episode overall. It was originally broadcast on digital channel BBC Three on 10 November 2008, and repeated on frontline channel BBC One on 17 November. The episode was written by Christian Spurrier, his first writing credit for the series, and directed by Edward Hall. Set during the 2008 financial crisis, in this episode, Section D chief Ros Myers (Hermione Norris) works undercover to stop Alexis Meynell (Paul Rhys), a banker who is attempting to bankrupt the country. Later, Ros discovers Meynell's motive.

The idea behind the episode came from the Nationalisation of Northern Rock in late 2007; the producers wanted to set up a story about a bank collapse so severe it could result in an economic collapse. The episode was filmed in May 2008, with a lot taking place in London's Blue Fin building. About six million viewers saw the episode from both BBC One and Three broadcasts; the BBC One ratings were steady despite heavy competition from I'm a Celebrity, Get Me Out of Here! on ITV1. Critical reactions towards the episode were positive for including a change in plot.

== Plot ==
Section D believes banker Alexis Meynell is trying to bankrupt the country. Sir Harry Pearce (Peter Firth) asks the Chancellor of the Exchequer Gillian Calderwood (Selina Cadell) to freeze Meynell's assets, but is turned down due to lack of evidence. To get the evidence they need, Ros is sent undercover to the London Stock Exchange, where Meynell is targeting the bank Highland Life. After starting a rumour about the bank, he starts betting against it. When the chairman of Highland Life, Francis Debham (Simon Williams), attempts to keep the bank afloat, Meynell doubles his position, bankrupting Highland Life. Ros uses the opportunity to swipe a memory card from Meynell's mobile phone, containing his secure email account that could prove his guilt. However, they find nothing relevant. Lucas North (Richard Armitage) relays this to Ros and tells her to get closer to Meynell.

Ben Kaplan (Alex Lanipekun) breaks into Meynell's office to learn of deals between Highland Life and Salma, a Russian bank that according to Elizabeta Starkova (Paloma Baeza), has connections with the Russian mafia. It is also revealed Highland Life owes Salma £65 billion. It was this reason that earlier in the episode, Denham committed suicide. In order to get Meynell to trust her to become part of his plan, Ros sleeps with him. Later, Calderwood receives a call from Asa Darlek (Stephen Noonan), Meynell's associate from Salma, and threatens to either have the £65 billion paid back, or he will go public to inform the country the true extent of its debts. Ros presents a third option; have Calderwood announce she will back Highland Life, while at the same time she will convince Meynell to bet against it. Such a plan would financially ruin Meynell. The next morning however, Darlek realises she is MI5 and threatens to kill her if Calderwood does not back down. Ros fights the gun off and Calderwood goes ahead with her statement. Later, Lucas releases Elizabeta as an asset. Meanwhile, Jo Portman (Miranda Raison) believes Boscard (Gus Gallagher), her captor from the end of series six, is still alive after seeing several hallucinations of him. Later, Ros puts her mind at rest when she shows Jo photographic evidence Boscard is indeed dead, and it was Jo who killed him.

Running on a tip that Connie James (Gemma Jones) may have leaked the top secret Sugarhorse to the Russians due to her affair with Hugo Prince, one of only five people to know about the operation, Harry has officers search her home. Harry later finds a tape left by Prince in a Big Ben souvenir. Prince left a message that there is a leak in Sugarhorse, but Connie is not responsible. Later, Harry admits to Lucas that in "The Tip-Off" he was lying about not knowing what Sugarhorse and asks him to recall anything during his interrogations. Lucas eventually recalls the word "Pilgrim" uttered several times. He did a background check and informs Harry that "Pilgrim" is the codename for Bernard Qualtrough, the same man apparently helping Harry find the mole.

== Production ==
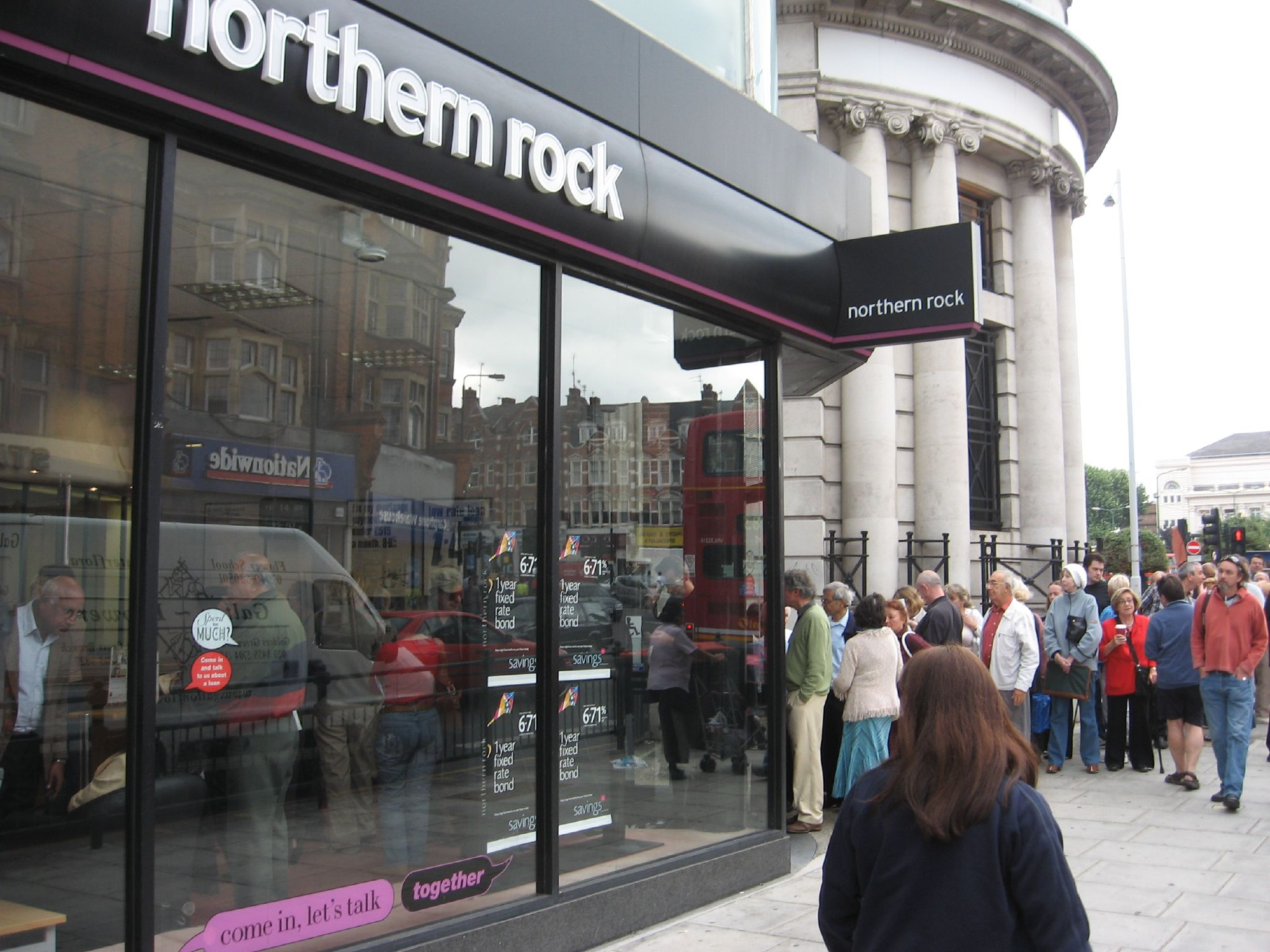
The episode was based on the Nationalisation of Northern Rock

The episode was written by Christian Spurrier, his first writing credit for the series. He joined the Spooks writing staff in January 2008. Producer Katie Swinden wanted to base an episode on the economy, which at the time was facing the Great Recession following the Nationalisation of Northern Rock just months before. After trying a few different stories, the producers settled on a story about a bank collapse that is so severe it could result in an economic collapse. Spurrier did research on banking climate in the City of London in March 2008, and realised the economy was going down, but also wanted to exaggerate the numbers for the episode. Ros was chosen to lead because the character had a background in business. In some of the original drafts of the episode, John Castle would return as Jocelyn Myers, Ros' father, but later on the producers realised they did not need him. The producers also wanted to include some jeopardy in the climax, namely adding a gun to a head or a bomb, which created the scenes where Darlek threatened to kill Ros. Spurrier felt he had a "lot of juggling" in writing three separate storylines; the main plot, the Sugarhorse subplot and Jo; but did a lot of learning how to write a Spooks script as he wrote it.

The character of Alexis Meynell was inspired by Howard Brenton's writing for "The Russian" in the fourth series. Spurrier wanted him to always suspect Ros, but at the same time be intrigued by her. The producers enjoyed casting Paul Rhys for the role as his performance was "fantastically scary." In playing Asa Darlek, Stephen Noonan had to abandon his Liverpudlian accent and sport a Russian one, which Noonan worked hard on. Director Edward Hall provided the voice for Hugo Prince.

The episode was filmed throughout May 2008. The helicopter shots of the city were filmed before principal photography of the seventh series started. Almost all scenes were shot during the day, including the scenes set during the night. The second day of the shoot for the episode took place at a house not belonging to the crew, used as the home of Connie James. The Blue Fin building in London provided several locations for the episode, mostly the stock exchange room. Real life traders were used to film scenes set in the floor. Swinden noted that the traders were "interesting guys" to work with, and told the producers the story was "very close to home." The producers borrowed two expensive cars, more prominently an Aston Martin DB9 convertible, which were driven by Armitage and Norris. Armitage was asked to drive the car for only 10 yards, but the actor ended up getting carried away by wheel-spinning and driving the car around a city block. Another car was a Bentley used for Denham's suicide. Because it was on loan, Firth's options on acting as if he was trying to save Denham was very limited without having to damage the car.

== Broadcast and reception ==
The episode was originally broadcast on the digital channel BBC Three from 10:30 pm on Monday, 10 November 2008, after the broadcast of the fourth episode on BBC One. The episode would later be repeated on BBC One the next week on 17 November 2008 during the 9 pm to 10 pm time slot, except in Northern Ireland, where it was withheld until 10:35 pm. According to overnight figures, the first look on BBC Three was seen by 691,500, a 6.1 per cent share on its timeslot. The BBC One repeat was viewed by 4.95 million, with a 20.3% audience share. Though it went against I'm a Celebrity, Get Me Out of Here! on ITV1, which attracted over eight million viewers, Spooks ratings remained steady from the previous week. According to the final numbers from the Broadcasters' Audience Research Board, the episode was viewed by 0.79 million from BBC Three, and later 5.21 million from BBC One, together adding up to 6 million.

The episode received positive reactions from television critics. Gerard O'Donovan of The Daily Telegraph called it "another pertinent, brilliantly written episode" and reacted positively towards the episode's "new kind of threat: the economic terrorist." O'Donovan also praised Paul Rhys' acting for "giving his villainous all." Mof Gimmers of TV Scoop praised the episode for having "a refreshing change from the usual theme of this series", with Rhys' performance and the sub plot of the Sugarhorse story arc adding "definitely one of the best stories so far in what has been an impressive series, if a little heavy on the Islamic terrorist side at times. With three episodes to go the Sugarhorse story is building nicely to a crescendo."

== See also ==
- Nationalisation of Northern Rock
- Late-2000s recession
