= Spooks series 6 =

6th series of the British television show Spooks

Spooks
- Season 6
- No. of episodes: 10

Release
- Original network: BBC One; BBC Three
- Original release: 16 October – 18 December 2007

Season chronology
- ← Previous; Series 5 Next → Series 7

The sixth series of the BBC espionage television series Spooks began broadcasting on 16 October 2007 and ended on 18 December 2007. The series, consisting of ten episodes, was serialised - a first for the programme. Appearing as recurring characters are CIA Agent, Bob Hogan, and Iranian Special Consul, Dariush Bakhshi, and his wife, Ana.

== Production ==
In June 2007 production visited Cliffe in Rochester in Kent to film various rural scenes, including a scene on a railway bridge for Episode 8 “Infiltration”.

== Cast ==
=== Main ===
- Rupert Penry-Jones as Adam Carter
- Hermione Norris as Ros Myers (episodes 1–8)
- Miranda Raison as Jo Portman
- Alex Lanipekun as Ben Kaplan (episodes 5–10)
- Raza Jaffrey as Zafar Younis (episode 1)
- Hugh Simon as Malcolm Wynn-Jones
- Gemma Jones as Connie James (episodes 2–10)
- Peter Firth as Harry Pearce

=== Guests ===
- Matthew Marsh as Bob Hogan
- Simon Abkarian as Dariush Bakhshi
- Agni Scott as Ana Bakhshi
- Claire Cox as Anne Beuchet
- James Laurenson as Sholto
- Robert Glenister as Nicholas Blake
- Alex Dee as Agent Bill
- Ofo Uhiara as Michael Johnson
- Anna Chancellor as Juliet Shaw
- Sam Spruell as Jason Belling
- Guy Gallagher as Boscard

== Episodes ==
No. overall	No. in series	Title	Directed by	Written by	Original release date	UK viewers (millions)
47	1	"The Virus (Part 1)"	Omar Madha	Neil Cross	16 October 2007 (BBC One)	6.61
Section D receives intelligence that an Iranian agent, Mehan Asnik, is planning to attack London during a peace deal between Iran and the UK. The Home Secretary directs Harry to deal with Asnik before he arrives; Adam's team travel to Tehran to kill him using a bomb, so it will look like an internal struggle within the Iranian security forces. The bomb is detonated, but Asnik escapes unharmed and arrives at the British Embassy to defect. It is revealed that Asnik is working under instructions from someone with a British accent, known only as "Copenhagen". They bring him to the UK, but shortly after they land, mercenaries ambush the team and capture Mehan and Zaf, who is wounded. Mehan has been infected with a weaponised virus and has just entered a contagious phase, after an 18-hour incubation period. The team realise that they have been fed false information, so that a plague will be released in Iran. A deal is made to exchange Zaf for money, but the mercenaries break the deal and kidnap Adam as well during the exchange. Before Adam escapes, having to leave Zaf behind, the mercenaries release an already contagious Asnik into the public.
48	2	"The Virus (Part 2)"	Omar Madha	Neil Cross	16 October 2007 (BBC Three) (Note: "The Virus, Part 2" airs right after "Part 1" on BBC Three; The series would continue on BBC One a week after the BBC Three broadcast)	5.78
Quarantine is imposed on St Edwin's Hospital where Mehan sought help and on members of the public. Adam is now infected and will continue working, but is instructed by Harry to go into quarantine before the end of the incubation period. After determining that either France, India, Russia, or the US has a vaccine for the virus, the team kidnaps a senior spy from each country, including CIA agent Bob Hogan. They bring them to the bunker of former MI5 officer Connie James and threaten them with the virus. The Russian, Edik Kuznetzov reveals his country has the vaccine. Jo and Adam take Kuznetzov to a rendezvous with Russian agents to seize the vaccine. By then, Adam starts showing symptoms. Jo and Kuznetzov stay behind to stall the agents who have returned, while Adam takes the vaccine to the hospital. Kuznetzov is shot multiple times while pleading for Jo's life. Despite nearly losing the vaccine again, it is delivered to St Edwin's and the plague is halted. Jo is shaken by her response to the events of the day and the requirements of the job. Ros learns that French intelligence may know the whereabouts of Zaf, but before following up on possible leads, she is shot with a stun dart in her home.
49	3	"The Kidnap"	Charles Beeson	Rupert Walters	23 October 2007 (BBC Three)	6.12
Ros is abducted and tortured by Magritte, a French security officer, as part of a recruitment test for Yalta. Sholto, a Yalta representative, explains that the world-wide shadow organisation is named after the treaty that ended World War II and its aim is to stop the Americans from taking strategic actions that destabilise the world. Ros is given his clothing as evidence that Zaf is dead. Meanwhile, a cargo plane crashes near a US base. The Ministry of Defence has established a cordon around the crash site, allegedly because the plane was carrying toxic chemicals, which later proves to be false. Adam and Malcolm infiltrate a UFO enthusiast group camped outside the base as a cover to break in. The two realise that the crash was caused by a prototype stealth plane "Aurora", which followed MI5 during their operation in Tehran, leading Adam to conclude the Americans are running "Copenhagen". Ros's anger at the Americans' latest actions in Tehran, Zaf's death, and now Aurora, leads her to co-operate with Yalta.
50	4	"The Extremist"	Charles Beeson	David Farr	30 October 2007 (BBC Three)	5.62
Algerian extremist Abdul Kahrami, breaks out of house arrest to launch a bomb attack. The target is unknown, but the Iranian Special Consul, Dariush Bakhshi is involved. Adam asks Bakhshi's wife, Ana, whom Adam had an affair with, to spy on her husband. While recording a conversation, Ana inadvertently kills a consulate guard to maintain her secret. Adam instructs her to stage an attempted rape as a cover. The recording of the meeting reveals only a simple business meeting and plan to have dinner at a hotel later. While following an informant who has been recruited as Kahrami's driver, Jo is captured. She is put in the boot of a car rigged with a bomb. Ros uses intelligence provided by Yalta to help the team realise that Bakhshi is the target, not a co-conspirator. Adam alerts Bakhshi about the bomb and escapes, whilst freeing Jo just before the bomb goes off. Kahrami is arrested again, along with his cell. Bakhshi reveals to Ana that he knows that she is working for the British government.
51	5	"The Deal"	Brendan Maher	Zinnie Harris	6 November 2007 (BBC Three)	5.58
A Russian is selling the Iranians blueprints for missile firing triggers so they can gain nuclear capability. Adam kills a journalist who disguises himself as a mugger, and as a consequence, reporter Ben Kaplan publishes the story and Adam is on the run. Ros receives intelligence from Yalta about the Russian, and in exchange she agrees to bug the Grid. Ana gives Adam a tip, which helps the team learn when and where the delivery will take place. The Grid follows the Russian, and are able to switch the blueprints with fake ones. With Kaplan's help, Adam and Harry learn that the sale to the Iranians was secretly orchestrated by the Americans, and that the plans contain a flaw so the Iranian nuclear programme will be set back. They make a deal to allow the sale to go through and in return Hogan would help clear Adam's name. Adam has a final tryst with Ana at a hotel, where she tries to kill him under instruction from her husband; Ros stops this and learns that Bakhshi knows the blueprints are fake and was able to obtain a real firing trigger. Ros fires her gun, presumably killing Ana.
52	6	"The Courier"	Brendan Maher	George Tiffin	13 November 2007 (BBC Three)	5.30
Acting on the information from Ana, the team learns that a courier with the firing trigger is boarding a flight to Tehran. Section D receives an email warning that if the courier does not arrive in Iran, a bomb will release a toxic chemical into the water supply. The email reinforces Harry's suspicions that there is a mole within the Grid and orders a sweep for bugs. Ros is conflicted about her participation in Yalta, when she learns that they arranged the sale of the trigger to Iran to limit American power. Adam and Ros go undercover on the flight to find the courier. They must identify the courier, but cannot stop the flight until the threat to the water supply is eliminated. After clearing three suspects, they discover there is an extra passenger on the flight. After Jo and Malcolm prevent the chemicals from leaving the pumping station, the extra passenger is subdued and handcuffed to his seat. But the man dies later when the plane depressurises and he cannot reach his oxygen mask. After the plane lands, it is revealed that the extra passenger is a CIA agent and that the pilot is the courier. Adam and Ros are too late to stop the transfer of the trigger into Iranian hands. Ros's last bug on the Grid is found on the sweep by an officer who is also working for Yalta. Sholto is disappointed, but still wants to keep Ros around— for now.
53	7	"The Broadcast"	Stefan Schwartz	David Farr	20 November 2007 (BBC Three)	4.94
To prevent Iran from announcing that they are a nuclear power after acquiring the firing trigger, Harry and Hogan approach Bakhshi with a peace accord between their three countries. It is to be announced on a live BBC current affairs programme with Bakhshi, Hogan, and a senior UK cabinet member participating. Ben is asked to write a favourable story in exchange for being included in the audience. In turn, Ben asks Adam for help identifying a woman in a photo, who unbeknownst to them is Magritte. When Iran asks for too much, Harry persuades Bakhshi to accept more reasonable terms by offering to give Ana a new identity and a new life in Vancouver - unbeknownst to Adam, Ros had faked shooting her. In a meeting where Ros tries to convince Yalta to back down, Magritte plants a bug and follows her to the safe house where Ana is being held. However, the TV show is hijacked by armed terrorists, who want the participants to confirm on-air that Iran is now a nuclear state, and threaten to shoot the hostages if broadcasting is cut or interrupted. Harry and Connie learn that the man who let the gunmen in was an MI5 agent, who was part of the Yalta network. The agent also reveals that Yalta had been ineffectual for years, but only recently came to life thanks to a new well-placed mole inside the security services. With Ben Kaplan's help, Adam and Ros stop the gunmen. Bakhshi is shot, but will survive. Adam discovers that Ana is still alive. He and Ros rush to save Ana from Yalta kidnappers. In the end, Adam and Ros confront each other about their respective deception and embrace.
54	8	"Infiltration"	Stefan Schwartz	Neil Cross	27 November 2007 (BBC Three)	5.26
After learning of Yalta during the hostage-taking in the previous episode, Hogan assassinates several members. Hostilities between Iran and America are escalating in the Gulf. Kaplan is watching Magritte and follows her to a meeting with Ros, who is asked to obtain codes to initiate an attack against the Americans. Realising that Kaplan has video of the meeting and that she has been exposed as a mole, Ros asks to be pulled, but Yalta insists that she carries out her assignment. In a last-ditch effort to save herself and to avert a war in the Gulf, Ros shows up at Thames House and claims that she infiltrated Yalta to use them as an intelligence asset. Harry and Adam do not trust her, but decide to use her, so they can take down Yalta and prevent the attack on the Americans. They follow Ros to a rendezvous with Yalta, where they learn that Juliet Shaw is the mastermind behind Yalta and the code is to launch a computer attack on the US satellite network. Malcolm is able to end the attack, but there has been enough damage that the Americans cannot go ahead with missile launches against the Iranians. However, in the process, Juliet gives Ros a lethal injection. Fortunately, Adam was able to switch the injection with a paralysing agent beforehand, faking her death. During her funeral, Adam revives Ros and gives her a new identity to hide from Hogan.
55	9	"Isolated"	Alrick Riley	Neil Cross	4 December 2007 (BBC Three)	4.84
Disgusted by recent events, Adam gives Kaplan the story of MI5's involvement in the Tehran train bomb. Unbeknownst to Adam, his conversation was recorded by agents working for Bakhshi. Before Adam has a chance to hand over the proof, Section D is closed down pending an inquiry into Yalta's infiltration. Davie King, one of Harry's former assets from the IRA and now sworn enemy, has been sent to assassinate the team. King contacts Harry, and tells him that he has planted a bomb in London; the entire team must approach the car containing the bomb or else he will detonate it, killing nearby civilians. The team deduces that well-placed officials must be involved to get King into the country. Connie confronts Hogan and realises that it was not the Americans, leaving Whitehall as the prime suspect. With their wits, and a little help from Hogan, the team find King and stop him. Harry confronts the Home Secretary regarding the plot and discovers that it was part of a peace deal with Bakhshi. The UK would sell to Tehran a nuclear reactor that uses fuel that cannot be made into weapons. As part of the deal, Bakhshi demands the members of Section D be eliminated to protect himself and Ana. Harry reluctantly understands, because the deal was in the best interests of British security.
56	10	"The School"	Alrick Riley	Ben Richards	18 December 2007 (BBC One)	5.68
The Israelis bomb the Gaza Strip and a girls' school is collateral damage. Bakhshi warns Harry of a revenge attack, as a parting gift: Al Qaeda has a British school under surveillance in advance of an attack. Zaf is found tortured to death in Pakistan. Adam learns from Hogan that Zaf was kidnapped from the Yalta operatives by a group called the Redbacks, mercenaries who capture spies, torture them for information while their clients listen, then sell them on. Harry learns that the visiting Venezuelan President is targeted for assassination by the Americans using a deniable asset. In exchange for stopping the assassin, the Venezuelan embassy intelligence officer will give Section D the name of the British school being targeted. The Redbacks have returned to London and kidnap Jo. While Adam attempts to retrieve her, he is betrayed by Hogan, who is revealed to be working for the Redbacks. Hogan is captured by the Americans, who refuse to let him give more information to Harry unless he gives them their failed assassin - but the Venezuelans would then not give the name of the targeted school. While being held, Jo begs Adam to kill her, because she is afraid of being tortured and will reveal intelligence. Harry deceives the Americans and does a deal with the Venezuelans to prevent the bombing and to learn the location of the security officers. When tactical forces arrive at the house where they are being held, it appears that Adam has killed Jo.
