= Spooks series 5 =

5th series of the British television show Spooks

Spooks
- Season 5
- No. of episodes: 10

Release
- Original network: BBC One
- Original release: 17 September – 13 November 2006

Series chronology
- ← Previous; Series 4 Next → Series 6

The fifth series of the BBC espionage television series Spooks began broadcasting on 17 September 2006 before ending on 13 November 2006. The series consists of ten episodes. Ruth Evershed left after the fifth episode, not returning until Series 8; the actor playing the part, Nicola Walker was expecting her first child.

== Cast ==
=== Main ===
- Rupert Penry-Jones as Adam Carter
- Hermione Norris as Ros Myers
- Raza Jaffrey as Zafar Younis
- Miranda Raison as Jo Portman
- Hugh Simon as Malcolm Wynn-Jones
- Rory MacGregor as Colin Wells (episode 1)
- Nicola Walker as Ruth Evershed (episode 1–5)
- Peter Firth as Harry Pearce

=== Guest ===
- Gugu Mbatha-Raw as Jenny
- James Dicker as Wes Carter
- Anna Chancellor as Juliet Shaw
- Robert Glenister as Nicholas Blake (episodes 1 & 2)
- Lindsay Duncan as Angela Wells (episode 1)
- Ofo Uhiara as Michael Johnson
- Tim McInnerny as Oliver Mace
- Saskia Reeves as Sally Bernard
- Matt Day as Neil Sternin
- Phyllis Logan as Diana Jewell

== Episodes ==
No. overall	No. in series	Title	Directed by	Written by	Original release date	UK viewers (millions)
37	1	"Gas and Oil (Part 1)"	Omar Madha	Ben Richards	17 September 2006 (BBC One)	6.31
After shooting Adam, Angela jumps off the roof and kills herself. While Adam recovers, a gas and oil depot is attacked, followed by assassinations of some MPs. At first, MI5 suspect Al-Qaeda, but they discover that a group of influential businessmen, politicians and members of MI6 led by Jocelyn Myers are responsible, in an attempt to take control of the UK. Jo is tasked with protecting the Prime Minister's son. Colin is abducted and murdered by the conspirators. They launch another attack, taking over air traffic control and attempting to cause a mid-air collision over the heart of London. Jocelyn's daughter, Ros Myers warns Juliet, Adam and Harry that their cars are rigged with bombs.
38	2	"Gas and Oil (Part 2)"	Omar Madha	Ben Richards	17 September 2006 (BBC Three) (Note: "Gas and Oil (Part 2)" was broadcast on 18 September 2006 on BBC One; the rest of the series (apart from the finale) would usually rebroadcast on BBC One seven days after the BBC Three broadcast.)	5.75
While Zaf is able to prevent the collision, the car bombs leave Juliet paralysed from the waist down. The conspirators manage to coax the PM to give in to their plan, including detaining citizens without trial, and to have armed police officers shoot people attending a protest to oppose their new plans. Harry is arrested and sent to a detention facility by the new rules, to prevent him from stopping them. However, the rest of the team are able to convince Ros that her father is the ringleader, and they force him to surrender. They are informed of Harry's location, and Zaf manages to stop Collingwood from setting fire to the entire detention centre, by activating the sprinkler system beforehand. Adam offers Ros a position on the Grid.
39	3	"The Cell"	Julian Simpson	Ben Richards	18 September 2006 (BBC Three)	6.12
Zaf goes undercover to infiltrate an Al-Qaeda cell, who are preparing to attack London with a thermobaric weapon. Ros also tasks Zaf to try to turn one of the members, who broke up with his girlfriend after converting to Islam. Jo and Adam pose as mercenaries to try to buy the weapon before it reaches the cell; the operation is cut short after the arms dealer assaults Jo and reveals the weapon has already been sold. By the time the weapon arrives in England, Adam is able to commandeer the weapon, but he discovers that someone is planning to detonate it remotely. Armed units are able to take the terrorist down. Meanwhile, Harry and Ruth start a brief romance, which Ruth ends after learning everyone on The Grid knows about it.
40	4	"World Trade"	Kenny Glenaan	David Farr	25 September 2006 (BBC Three)	5.79
Section D is tasked to ensure a successful "Addressing Africa" summit for the British Foreign Secretary. Adam and the team soon uncover a plot to assassinate an attending African president. After they successfully capture the would-be female assassin, Adam and the team find evidence that, after the summit, the president will buy weapons of mass destruction to commit a genocide against his own poverty-stricken people. Adam advises the assassin to escape, allowing her to successfully assassinate the president. Despite Adam disarming her, the Foreign Secretary orders a member of his security team to kill her. When the Foreign Secretary later threatens Harry's job, the team's embarrassing audio of his closed door comments from a previous conversation at the summit convinces him to back off.
41	5	"The Message"	Kenny Glenaan	Zinnie Harris	2 October 2006 (BBC Three)	5.89
Ruth witnesses the Head of Security for Cotterdam prison commit suicide in an Underground station; the prison had recently suffered a fire that reportedly killed seven terrorist suspects. Ros, not yet comfortable within the team, is duped into helping frame Ruth for the guard's death (she later helps Ruth find the truth). Harry takes the rap for Ruth, but not wanting that to happen, Ruth is able to incriminate herself and works with the team to have Harry released, and fake her own death. It is eventually revealed that Oliver Mace faked the terrorists' deaths, and sent them to Egypt to be tortured. With this evidence, the team force Mace to resign. Harry says goodbye to Ruth, who then leaves the country.
42	6	"Hostage Takers (Part 1)"	Andy Hay	Raymond Khoury	9 October 2006 (BBC Three)	6.05
After a group of terrorists are discovered smuggling themselves into England, MI5 know a series of suicide attacks will happen during negotiations for the government to sell nuclear power to Saudi Arabia. During the operation to stop the attacks, Ros goes undercover seducing and drugging members of the Saudi Arabian royal family to get information. Meanwhile, Adam starts an affair with Wes' babysitter after she wakes him from a nightmare about losing Wes. One of the new members of Section D is a mole for the terrorists, who are using the suicide bombers as a distraction. Zaf and Adam stop a suicide bomber, only to find the "bomb" is just putty. At the same time, gunmen attack the Saudi Trade Centre, and tie up the hostages, including Ros who is present.
43	7	"Hostage Takers (Part 2)"	Andy Hay	Raymond Khoury	16 October 2006 (BBC Three)	5.53
The gunmen demand the release of al Qaeda prisoners, or they'll execute a hostage every hour. MI5 uncover the mole, who when caught, commits suicide so as to not divulge any information. Eventually, MI5 discover that the hostage situation is not al Qaeda's style. It is revealed that the hostage takers are in fact Mossad agents trying to stop the nuclear deal. After Ros provides some needed intel, SAS is able to storm the Trade Centre and kill all but one of the gunmen; Adam subdues the leader, who is then handed over to the Americans.
44	8	"Agenda"	Julian Simpson	Julian Simpson	23 October 2006 (BBC Three)	5.97
Two fundamentalist Islamic clerics are murdered by the "Sons of Phinehas", a radical Christian group led by Steven Paynton, who runs a homeless charity where he recruits his group members. Adam goes undercover as a prospective investor to uncover the identities of his "soldiers". Wes runs away, trying to get to Adam who he thinks is abroad on a work trip. This causes Adam to have a panic attack at a crucial point in the operation: Mossad, who have interests in Paynton's operation, has sent a kill squad into its headquarters. After they kill Paynton, Harry talks the Mossad leader into backing down before the squad corners Adam. Wes is found by the end of the episode.
45	9	"The Criminal"	Julian Holmes	Neil Cross	30 October 2006 (BBC Three)	5.80
MI5 are assigned to protect Niko Grecic, a Serbian war criminal who is testifying against his former commander at the Hague. A former MI6 officer, Richard Dempsey, is believed to be targeting him. Dempsey and Adam are old friends, but while undercover Dempsey let Adam be tortured and it is believed Dempsey has defected. Dempsey contacts Adam and wants his help clearing his name, but Harry orders Jo and Zaf to kill him. Adam and Dempsey are able to prove that Dempsey is not the one trying to kill Grecic, whose evidence convicts the former commander. However, six months later in Rio de Janeiro, Dempsey does kill Grecic.
46	10	"Aftermath"	Julian Holmes	David Farr	13 November 2006 (BBC One)	6.47
When a North Sea tidal surge threatens to flood London, an eco-terror group, Divine Earth take control of the Thames Barrier, rig it with explosives and threaten to blow it unless the government publishes a report, "Aftermath", which states that the government will build in economic and military strength so that Britain and America can control the remaining resources from global warming. Meanwhile, Harry learns that Adam is becoming suicidal and has gone into a complete breakdown during the operation. To prevent the group from destroying the barrier, MI5 must flood part of it to counter the threat. However, Adam and Ros are in those sections. After stopping Divine Earth, the two narrowly escape drowning.
