= Spooks series 7 =

7th series of the British television show Spooks

Spooks
- Season 7
- DVD cover art of the Spooks series seven
- No. of episodes: 8

Release
- Original network: BBC One; BBC Three
- Original release: 27 October – 8 December 2008

Season chronology
- ← Previous; Series 6 Next → Series 8

The seventh series of the BBC espionage television series Spooks (known as MI-5 in the United States) began broadcasting on 27 October 2008 on BBC One before ending on 8 December 2008 on the same channel, and consists of eight episodes, two fewer than previous series. It follows the actions of Section D, a counter-terrorism division in MI5. The primary storyline involves Sugarhorse, a top secret operation set up by MI5 during the final years of the Cold War, and a mole working for the FSB who intends to leak the operation to the Russians. Peter Firth, Rupert Penry-Jones, Hermione Norris, Richard Armitage, Miranda Raison, Gemma Jones, Hugh Simon and Alex Lanipekun are credited as the main cast.

Penry-Jones announced his intention to leave the series in December 2007, while it was later announced Armitage would join. Norris and Raison were both asked back after their characters were left open to return at the end of the last series. In developing the series, the producers wanted to repeat the serialised style from series six, and settled on using the resurgence of Russia as the primary storyline as they felt it was, at the time, subtly threatening the security of the West. The producers also participated in several meetings with the writers to discuss the purpose of Sugarhorse. Filming started in London in March 2008, and finished in August 2008 in Moscow, the first time in series history where Spooks was filmed outside the United Kingdom.

The seventh series received healthy ratings, with both BBC One and BBC Three ratings together achieving 6.13 million viewers per episode. The series also attracted critical acclaim, with some reviewers considering it to be the best series of Spooks so far. Both factors allowed the BBC to commission an eighth series of the programme for 2009. The seventh series was released on DVD on 12 October 2009 in the United Kingdom, 30 March 2009 in Australia, and 26 January 2010 in the United States.

== Episodes ==
No. overall	No. in series	Title	Directed by	Written by	Original release date	UK viewers (millions)
57	1	"New Allegiances"	Colm McCarthy	Neil Cross & Ben Richards	27 October 2008 (BBC One)	5.91
Six months following "The School" it is revealed Jo Portman played dead and then killed her captor Boscard. Private Andy Sullivan is kidnapped by an Al-Qaeda cell, who demand Remembrance Sunday be cancelled or Sullivan will be executed. Harry Pearce finally secures the release of Lucas North, an MI5 officer who was imprisoned in Russia for eight years. He and Adam Carter work together to rescue Sullivan. Meanwhile, Ros Myers is stationed in Moscow and learns that a Chechen assassin codenamed "Tranquility" has planted a car bomb to be detonated at 11 am in a memorial service. With too little time to defuse it, Adam drives the rigged car to an unpopulated zone, but is killed when it explodes as he gets out. Realising FSB head of operations in London Arkardy Katchimov withheld this intelligence, Harry vows revenge.
58	2	"Split Loyalties"	Colm McCarthy	Neil Cross & Ben Richards	27 October 2008 (BBC Three) (Note: "Split Loyalties" on 28 October 2008 on BBC One; the rest of the series would continue on BBC One a week after the BBC Three broadcast)	5.63
Harry asks his superior, Richard Dolby, to pursue Katchimov, but is denied. However, Harry pursues him anyway. Malcolm Wynn-Jones believes there is a Russian submarine in British waters, and deduces its intention to carry out a cyber attack via a submarine communications cable. Lucas meanwhile is revealed to be a double agent for the Russians and is being handled by Elizabeta Starkova, his ex-wife who works in the FSB. After learning of his involvement, Ros brings Lucas in; Lucas claims he is actually stopping Katchimov by earning Katchimov's trust. Lucas forges evidence to make Katchimov appear to his bosses to be working for MI-5, which helps Lucas to convince Katchimov to identify the specific cable to be attacked. With knowledge of the cable, Malcolm foils the cyber attack, disabling the submarine's computer systems. The submarine would have sunk except for a rescue by the Royal Navy, which sends a message to Moscow. Katchimov is later arrested. In revenge for Adam Carter's death, Harry kills Katchimov with a shot to the chest. Harry appoints Ros to succeed Adam as Chief of Section D. Lucas turns Elizabeta into an asset for MI5.
59	3	"The Tip-Off"	Peter Hoar	Russell Lewis & Ben Richards	28 October 2008 (BBC Three)	5.59
Ben Kaplan is on his first undercover assignment to infiltrate an Al-Qaeda cell that plans to launch suicide attacks after making threats on the Internet. There is to be a dry run first. During the operation, Ben becomes close to fellow cell member Jawad. Later, Ben learns the attacks have been moved forward to take place during the dry run. MI5 and CO19 disarm three of the bombs, and a fourth detonates with no civilian casualties. Section D discover that the "Mr. Big" behind the operation is the same man who warned MI5 of the attacks, Marlin, who kills himself after admitting he was forced to help following the kidnap of his family. Meanwhile, Lucas recalls that during his imprisonment in Russia, he was tortured for information relating to "Sugarhorse", MI5's "best kept secret" that only five people know of. Lucas knew nothing about it, but Harry clearly does. Fearing there is a high level mole working in MI5, Harry appoints retired spycatcher Bernard Qualtrough to discover the mole's identity.
60	4	"A Chance for Peace"	Peter Hoar	Richard McBrien	3 November 2008 (BBC Three)	5.29
Section D are stunned to learn that Mohammed Khordad, Al-Qaeda's number three, wants to talk with MI5, with intelligence on a planned attack in London in exchange that two Guantanamo Bay prisoners be released and have Home Secretary Nicholas Blake announce this on live television. When this is carried out, however, Khordad is arrested by a CIA team, much to Harry's frustration. After getting him released, Khordad discloses the location of the planned attack; a restaurant. However, Lucas learns from Elizabeta that the FSB is involved and has moved up the detonation time by ten minutes; if Lucas informs Harry and stops it earlier, the FSB will realise Lucas is not a double agent and will kill him. As a third option, Lucas disarms the bomb and plants a fake one to fool them. Before leaving, Khordad hands Harry intel on a new weapon being developed in Iran. After the meeting, Khordad's plane is shot down by the Americans over the Ural Mountains. Meanwhile, Qualtrough learns that Connie James may be the leak after learning that she had an affair with the late Hugo Prince, one of the few people who knows about Sugarhorse. Jo believes Boscard is still alive after seeing hallucinations of him.
61	5	"On the Brink"	Edward Hall	Christian Spurrier	10 November 2008 (BBC Three)	5.21
Ros goes undercover to stop Alexis Meynell, who is trying to bankrupt the United Kingdom. He starts by ruining rival bank Highland Life. As the case unfolds the chairman of Highland Life commits suicide after it is revealed the bank owes £65 billion pounds to Salma, a Russian bank with Russian mafia connections. Meynell's right hand man, Asa Darlek wants the £65 billion paid back, or he will release a statement letting the country know the full extent of its debts. Ros presents a third option; have Chancellor of the Exchequer Gillian Calderwood announce the government's intention to back Highland Life, while Ros convinces Meynell to continue betting against the bank. The plan works and Meynell is ruined. Meanwhile, Ros proves to Jo that Boscard is dead. Harry has a team search Connie's home for evidence linking her as the mole, but later finds a tape from Hugo Prince who tells Harry that she is not the leak. Harry asks Lucas to recall what happened when he was questioned on Sugarhorse; Lucas recalls the word "Pilgrim," who is later revealed to be Qualtrough's codename.
62	6	"Accidental Discovery"	Edward Hall	David Farr	17 November 2008 (BBC Three)	5.14
Lucas has to protect Dean Mitchell, a teenager in possession of a prototypical weapon that is capable of shutting down all electrical systems in a vehicle. Dean admits he witnessed somebody using the gun to assassinate a paparazzo and then stole it and a backpack. Furthermore, the team that are after Dean are MI6 led by Michael Sands. The paparazzo unknowingly took pictures of a meeting between Sands and UN diplomat Claude Denizet, where Denizet was threatened to resign from peace talks between Israel and Gaza. To protect Dean and his mother, Lucas sends them to Spain; Dean refuses to leave, and is assassinated by Sands as a consequence. Meanwhile, Harry reveals to Lucas and Ros the nature of Sugarhorse; he recruited several pro-Western Russians in the final years of the Cold War to infiltrate its government. Harry meets "Asset K" during the peace talks about the identity of the mole, only to discover somebody is setting him up as the leak.
63	7	"The Mole"	Sam Miller	James Moran & Christian Spurrier	24 November 2008 (BBC Three)	5.00
Moments after realising he has been framed and before being arrested, Harry phones Lucas and instructs him to meet Sugarhorse asset Maria Korachevsky in Moscow, who should know who the mole is. Harry is tortured to divulge the names of his Sugarhorse assets; if he tells the names, the mole will relay them to the FSB and they will be killed, preventing MI5's chance to learn what Russia intends to do against an American defence base in Poland. Two assets are already dead, and Malcolm believes the mole is within Section D. Lucas gets the information he needs and discovers Connie is the mole; he calls Ben, but when Connie realises Ben knows, she slits his throat. When Harry coughs the names of his assets, the rest of the team learn of Connie's treachery, and she is arrested. After he is released, Harry reveals he gave out the wrong names. In the end, Ros learns that a Sugarhorse asset is warning Harry "Tiresias wakes 3 pm tomorrow."
64	8	"Nuclear Strike"	Sam Miller	Neil Cross	8 December 2008 (BBC One)	5.95
Section D learn that Tiresias is Russia's own version of Sugarhorse, but "bigger and better". Tiresias activates sleeper agent Walter Crane to detonate a nuclear suitcase bomb in Grosvenor Square at 3 pm. The team find themselves forced to turn to Connie for assistance, as she helped set up Tiresias. After Lucas, Ros and Harry break her out, they journey to a locker Connie owns containing everything on Tiresias. However, they find themselves hunted by an FSB kill squad assigned to assassinate Connie and her team, unaware of the threat. While Lucas, Ros and Connie try to outrun them through disused London Underground tunnels, Harry visits FSB head of London Viktor Sarkisiian and explains to them that the entire FSB team and their family members living in London will die if the bomb goes off. The team is called off and ordered to aid Lucas. Connie finds the locker and Crane's location. The bomb is brought to Connie, who removes the nuclear material. However, the conventional detonator still explodes, killing Connie, who admits that she set Lucas up to the Russians eight years ago. In the end, Harry is seen bound and gagged in the boot of Sarkisiian's car.

== Cast ==
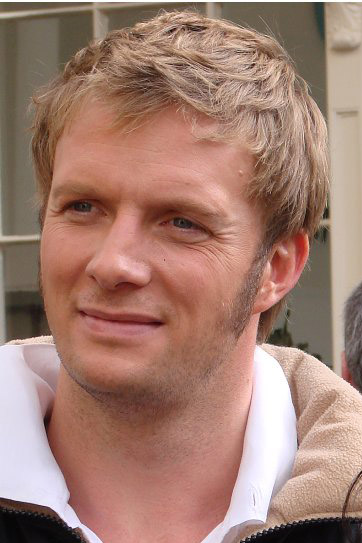
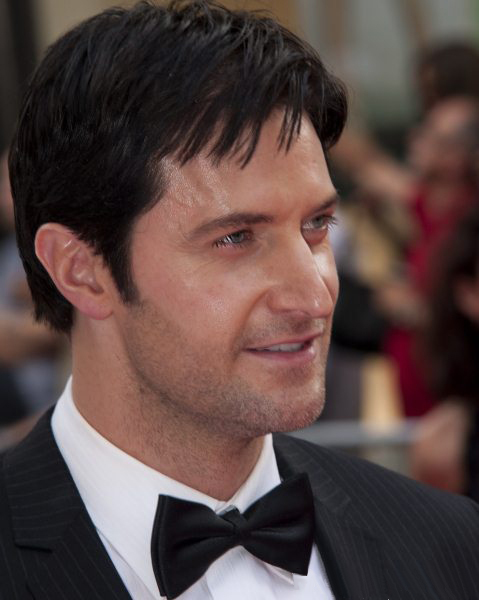
In December 2007, it was announced that Rupert Penry-Jones (left) would leave the series in its seventh year. Afterwards in March 2008, it was announced that Richard Armitage (right) would join the series.

The series consists of eight main cast members. Rupert Penry-Jones returned as Adam Carter for the first episode. In December 2007 Penry-Jones announced his intention to leave the series after appearing on the show for four years, because he felt his character had run its course and "getting to the point where I needed to move on," adding he would like to explore other avenues in his career. To keep the series fresh, the producers still wanted Adam's exit to be a shock to the audience. The actor found that his last days on Spooks were generally upsetting and "welled up" on his final day.

In March 2008 the BBC announced that Richard Armitage would join the series as Lucas North. The character was designed by the producers to become a "new heroic figure", and to become much more distant than Adam. Armitage was chosen early in the casting process as the producers believed he could carry the mystery of the character. Armitage was approached by the producers after he finished work on the second series of Robin Hood in which he portrayed the regular part of Sir Guy of Gisbourne. He accepted the role but was initially hesitant to join because of the "tall order" of replacing Penry-Jones. Armitage lost a stone in weight in preparation to keep with the description that Lucas is malnourished in the first episode, but still kept physically fit.

Elsewhere, Hermione Norris returns as Ros Myers. The character was initially written off after the eighth episode of the sixth series due to the actress's pregnancy; however, when the seventh series entered pre-production, Norris was asked to return and she accepted. Miranda Raison also returned as Jo Portman. The cliffhanger of the sixth series finale, where Jo was apparently killed, was to leave the audience wondering whether she survived. Raison stated that she realised the producers wanted her to return, as did she. Alex Lanipekun returned as Ben Kaplan, and was upgraded to a series regular. Lanipekun believed that the seventh series was "kind of for Ben," adding that there was an episode that would see his coming of age by dealing with his first undercover operation and the burden of getting close to someone who is involved with the group he was sent to stop. Peter Firth, Gemma Jones and Hugh Simon returned as Harry Pearce, Connie James and Malcolm Wynn-Jones, respectively.

== Production ==
=== Writing ===
The writers and producers got together to discuss what direction they would take for the seventh series. They wanted to repeat the same style for series six, which was to add a serial element to be carried throughout the duration of the series. They got together to think about what they would believe to be a big political story that would affect politics in the United Kingdom in within twelve to eighteen months after their initial meetings early in 2008. They settled on using Russia, which was facing a resurgence in power after the Cold War, which the producers felt, in subtle ways, would threaten the security of the west. Sometime through the writing process, the producers set up a story-arc, Sugarhorse, to be a threat throughout the series and have it resolved by the finale. The writers enjoyed making the Sugarhorse storyline because it was one of the instances that "really brings Harry to the edge" and causing him to doubt everything he has done or achieved. The writing team took several meetings together to discuss what it is and how it should work into the storyline. Christian Spurrier noted it was "kind of a headache" to figure out how to "weave it in" to the series and work out what parts would be used in which episodes. The producers wanted to use a scene relating to Sugarhorse as the finale scene of every episode it was featured in, as the producers believed it would provide a "right hook" to the audience. Adding the new storyline would allow the series to return to the world of spying, truth, and who the characters should trust.

Throughout the writing process, several cast members would give suggestion notes to the writers on how to improve some scenes. The writers were frequently annoyed with Armitage, who gave out more notes than any other cast members; however, the writers also liked some of his ideas and included them in the scripts. The producers believed that the seventh series was among the more brutal than the others, citing the violent death of Ben.

=== Filming ===
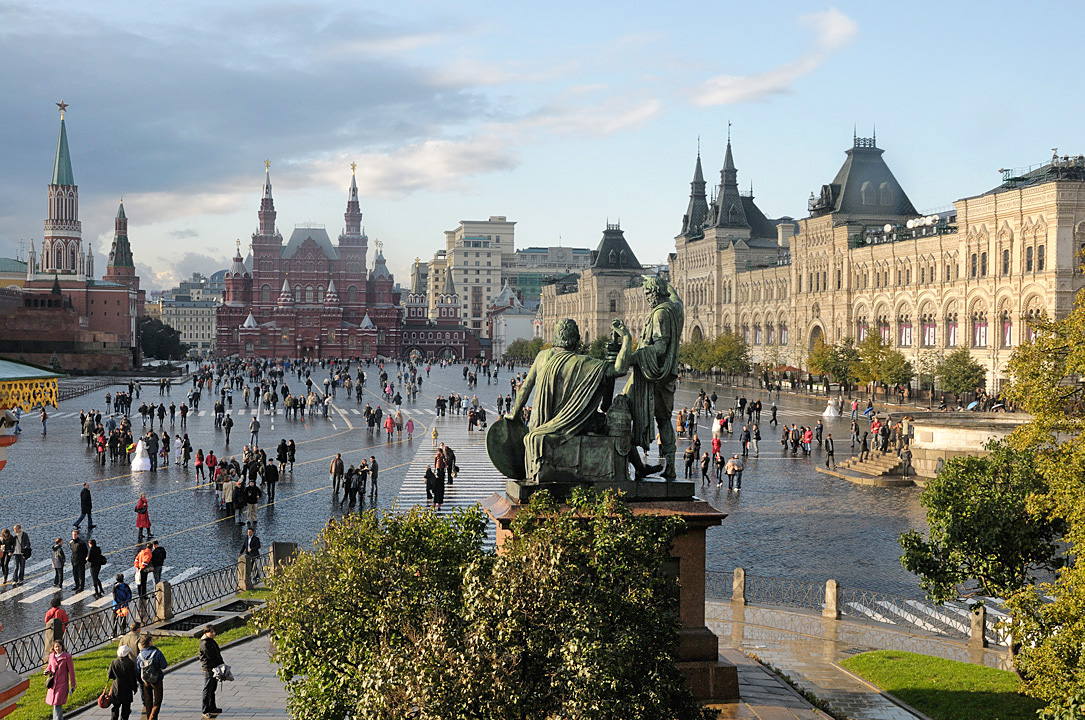
Filming partially took place in Moscow, Russia for the first and seventh episodes. It was the first time in series history where filming took place outside the United Kingdom.

Filming started in March 2008, and finished in August of the same year. Before principal photography commenced, director Colm McCarthy participated in helicopter shots over London. In each block of episodes, the cast and crew would often film all scenes held in certain locations at once, for instance all scenes set on the Grid, although taking place in different parts of each episodes, would all be filmed together before moving on to another set. However, the cast had trouble following the storylines with this method. A different Director of Photography was hired in each episode. Because of this, the filming style inside the Grid set changed in every episode. To film public shots, a small film crew was used so as to not attract too much attention from passers by. However, by using the small crew, they and the actors generally film the scenes unnoticed by the public, which the producers felt gave the characters such gravitas.

Filming finished in August 2008 in Moscow, Russia; it was the first time in series history where filming took place outside the United Kingdom; producer Katie Swinden stated that Spooks is usually "London-orientated," including when it comes to filming scenes set in other countries, and it usually does not take place outside the confines of the M25, the orbital motorway which encircles the UK's capital. However, the producers were able to afford to shoot in another country. A small crew was used to save costs. Armitage and Norris were the only two of the main actors who participated in the shoot. However, the main problem with filming in Moscow was the 30 °C (86 °F)-plus heat, and the actors had to wear winter coats because the episodes were set during the colder months.

=== Stunts ===
The producers allow the cast to perform many of their own stunts. In filming fight sequences, they were carefully choreographed beforehand so the actors could participate themselves. The guns featured on the series are real. In scenes where guns are included, an armourer is on hand throughout the entirety of the sequence to see if the actors are handling them properly and gives out the guns to the actors at the last possible second before filming. After the sequence is shot, the guns have to be returned and locked in a case to prevent anybody from playing with them, even if the guns are not loaded. Among other stunt work, Armitage was asked to be subjected to an actual waterboarding scene to ensure the authenticity of the sequence. The actor agreed after he was convinced by consultants from the FSB and CIA. Kudos film and television, the production company behind Spooks, had to follow several health and safety provisions from an advisor to ensure the sequence strictly adheres to the advice. The advisor and a medic were present during filming. Armitage was only waterboarded for a short time, and was filmed in slow motion to make it appear as if he was on for longer. The ambient temperature of the room was also raised to make Armitage as comfortable as possible. Following the sequence, Armitage stated "I only lasted five to ten seconds, and the sound of my voice crying out to stop isn't me acting."

== Broadcast and reception ==
=== Broadcast and ratings ===
The series was broadcast every Monday from 27 October to 8 December 2008 on BBC One, with the exception of the second episode, which aired on a Tuesday, the day after the first episode. However, the second through to the seventh episodes were repeated on BBC Three sometime after the BBC One broadcasts of the previous episode. The first episode "New Allegiances" was seen by 5.5 million and was given a strong audience share of 23.4 per cent. Although ratings were high, the premiere was down from the 6.6 million seen by the premiere of the previous sixth series. Some of the later episodes faced heavy competition from I'm a Celebrity, Get Me Out of Here! on ITV1; despite this, ratings for Spooks remained steady. The finale "Nuclear Strike" gave the seventh series its strongest ratings, with six million viewers. Combining both BBC One and BBC Three viewings, viewing figures for the seventh series averaged 6.13 million per episode. The series also became the ninth most watched series from BBC iPlayer, an Internet television service, of 2008.

=== Critical reception ===
Really? Yes, really. For a show to be in its seventh season, to maintain healthy ratings and audience share, and to be able to pull out a run of eight episodes that are as good as, if not the better, than the first couple of seasons, is quite a startling achievement.

— Mark Wright of The Stage

The seventh series attracted critical acclaim, with some reviewers considering it to be the best series of Spooks. Leigh Holmwood of The Guardian feared that the death of Adam "would have cast a long shadow", but barely noticed his absence given the pace of the episodes. Holmwood also believed that Lucas's introduction "more than made amends" for replacing Adam, and also felt the return of Ros Myers and her promotion was "a genius move". Mark Wright of The Stage thought that it was "stunning" with the last three episodes in particular "hitting new heights of tension and storytelling for the series," adding it is "as good as, if not the better, than the first couple of seasons". Wright also believed the series performed well with a reduced series length of eight as opposed to the ten episodes from the last few series, which he said allowed for "tighter, more focussed storytelling". He also felt the cast changes "always felt naturally organic", and praised Adam's exit, Lucas's introduction, and the "fantastic, strong female role model" of Hermione Norris's portrayal. Wright ended by saying "Spooks has been my favourite show of the last few months and indeed of 2008".

Mof Gimmers of TV Scoop named Spooks series seven as the best television show of 2008 out of 50 programmes. Gimmers felt the seventh series performed better than the previous, as it "lost its way slightly" with the concentration of Islamic extremists. The seventh series, however, was praised for bringing back the more traditional enemy, the Russians. With the introduction of Lucas North, Gimmers stated "the possibilities for double-blinding the audience were legion and every single one was exploited to the max". Gimmers also cited the more "pacy" plots due to a shorter series as another factor of the series's success, and also said "the only problem with having a series as good as this in the bag is how they will match it next year?". David Blackwell of Enterline Media said that the series's storylines "have a grain of truth reflecting today's climate" and also "more deeply rooted in gritty realism and preying on the real dangers that terrorists and other countries pose to the UK". Blackwell also posed the storylines also "keeps the characters human and show what they go through" and reacted positively towards Lucas's introduction, stating "I like Lucas North better than Adam Carter or Tom Quinn. His dark and conflicted persona adds to the story and makes him a more interesting character than Adam or Tom ever were". Blackwell summed up the series as "as great as the first six seasons. The show maintains a high standard of quality".

Following the end of the eighth series, Last Broadcast held a poll for the top five most shocking death scenes in Spooks. Two of them were deaths from the seventh series. Adam Carter's death was voted the fourth most shocking, while Ben Kaplan's death was voted third. Connie's death, however, was not listed. The featuring of an actual waterboarding scene drew criticism from Guardian columnist Zoe Williams, who wrote "it's really unpleasant, [Armitage] concurred. 'I only lasted five to 10 seconds, and the sound of my voice crying out to stop isn't me acting.' Pal, that's nice that you're not showing off but this is all wrong and despicable: it's like locking yourself and 10 friends into a loo on a commuter train, to see what it would be like on the train to Auschwitz. If you can make it stop whenever you like, you're learning nothing and kicking people in the face while you're at it".

=== Award nomination and renewal ===
The seventh series was nominated for a British Academy Television Award (BAFTA) for "Best Drama Series" in 2009, but lost to Wallander. Because of the strong ratings and positive feedback from fans and critics, the BBC announced they would recommission Spooks for an eighth series for 2009 on 4 December 2008, just days before the finale was set to air.

== Home video release ==
The series has been released on DVD in the United Kingdom (Region 2) on 12 October 2009. It was also released in the United States (Region 1) on 26 January 2010, and in Australia (Region 4) on 30 March 2009. The set consists of four discs and contain all eight episodes, as well as a few special features, including a Behind the Scenes documentary, which contain cast and crew interviews covering the characters and storylines of the series, "Spooks in Russia", a featurette behind the scenes of filming in Russia, "Action Sequence", which covers filming a chase sequence in episode six, and audio commentaries for episodes five and eight. The box set also contains the original trailer for the series, while the Region 1 release also contains trailers for other British television programmes, including Doctor Who, Torchwood and Primeval.
