= The Tip-Off (Spooks) =

- Spooks episode
- Episode no.: Series 7 Episode 3
- Directed by: Peter Hoar
- Written by: Russell Lewis & Ben Richards
- Original air date: 28 October 2008
- Running time: 58 minutes

Guest appearances
- Emilio Doorgasingh as Marlin; Ariyon Bakare as Nadif Abdelrashid; Tariq Jordan as Jawad; Robert East as Richard Dolby; Robert Glenister as Nicholas Blake; Richard Johnson as Bernard Qualtrough; Leon Jan as Faisal

Episode chronology
← Previous "Split Loyalties"	Next → "A Chance for Peace"
- Spooks (series 7)

"The Tip-Off" is the third episode of series seven of the British espionage television series Spooks, and the 59th episode overall. It was originally broadcast on digital channel BBC Three on 28 October 2008, and repeated on frontline channel BBC One on 3 November. The episode was written by Russell Lewis; with additional writing by Ben Richards; and directed by Peter Hoar. In the episode, Ben Kaplan (Alex Lanipekun) goes undercover to infiltrate an Al-Qaeda cell in London during a dry run before an expected attack. However, it later becomes apparent the terrorists are going to attack during the dry run.

Actor Alex Lanipekun believed the episode became a sort of "coming of age" for his character, as he had to deal with issues dealing with undercover operations including not to get close to a terrorist. The episode introduces the "Sugarhorse" story arc, which continues through to the series finale. In making the scene where Lucas North was waterboarded, Richard Armitage who portrays him was subjected to the actual torture to ensure the scene's authenticity. It was seen by over five million viewers after its original broadcast, and was given generally positive reviews. However, it received criticism for featuring the waterboarding scene.

== Plot ==
Chief of Section D Ros Myers (Hermione Norris) introduces Lucas North (Richard Armitage) to one of Adam Carter's assets, Pakistani intelligence officer Marlin (Emilio Doorgasingh). Marlin has information about a planned attack by Al-Qaeda; a cell intends to create Internet chatter, followed by a dry run, after which they will commence a series of suicide attacks. The ringleader behind this is Nadif Abdelrashid (Ariyon Bakare) who was previously responsible for similar attacks in Turkey and Somalia. Ben Kaplan is in his first undercover operation disguised as a recent convert to Islam and becomes part of the cell. As part of his cover, Ben shares a flat with Jawad (Tariq Jordan), another member. However, over the course of the operation Ben becomes close to Jawad, which Ben's handler Lucas advises against, as Jawad is not an innocent.

When Malcolm Wynn-Jones (Hugh Simon) discovers the chatter, Ben relays to the team that the dry run will commence the following day. On the day, Ben finds that Abdelrashid intends to carry out the attack ahead of schedule and during the dry run after Ben, Jawad, and two other men are given bombs. Ben relays this message to Lucas. Ros dispatches CO19 to apprehend Abdelrachid in his office, who intends to remote detonate the bombs. Another CO19 squad, as well as Lucas and Jo Portman (Miranda Raison) follow the cell members to a street market, which they will use to maximise civilian casualties. Ben admits he is MI5 to Jawad, who runs in panic and attempts to manually detonate his bomb; this results in getting gunned down by CO19 officers, much to Ben's dismay. After stopping another two bombs, Jawad's mobile phone rings, revealing Abdelrashid is not the "Mr. Big"; it is Marlin. He remote detonates the last bomb, killing the terrorist and the two CO19 officers holding him.

Although one bomb did detonate, Harry Pearce (Peter Firth) views the operation a success, as the other three did not, and no civilians were killed. Ben tells Lucas he was right about Jawad; he chose to become a bomber over seeing his family. Lucas receives a call from Marlin, who asks to meet with him. During the confrontation, Marlin admits he was forced to become Mr. Big when terrorists kidnapped his family. Now knowing he has failed, he commits suicide.

In a subplot, rainwater falls onto Lucas's face, which triggers a flashback where he was tortured by FSB interrogators during his eight-year imprisonment in Russia. The interrogators question him on "Sugarhorse." Lucas relays this to Harry, who claims not knowing what Sugarhorse is. However, he later visits a retired spycatcher Bernard Qualtrough (Richard Johnson) believing there is high level mole within MI5. He only reveals that Sugarhorse is MI5's "best kept secret" that only five people, including Richard Dolby (Robert East), the Director General, and himself, know the details of. Harry later returns to Qualtrough's bookstore to find out who the mole might be, starting by looking into Dolby's file.

== Production ==
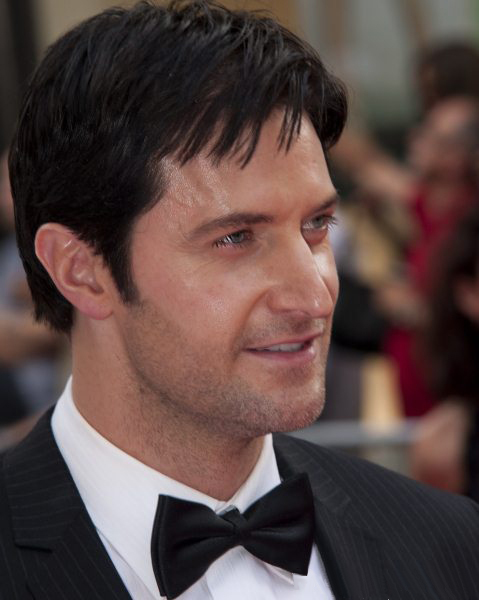
To ensure the authenticity of the waterboarding scene, Richard Armitage was subjected to the actual torture with several provisions.

The episode was written by Russell Lewis, with additional writing by Ben Richards. Ben Kaplan became the central character of the episode. Actor Alex Lanipekin, who portrays Ben, stated that "The Tip-Off" was a "kind of a coming of age" for the character, dealing with his first undercover operation. Lanipekun expanded:

First time he went undercover in episode three, and having to deal with death, with Adam, and then also in [the episode] with someone where he goes undercover with to try and infiltrate a cell, and then he gets close to the person that he is supposed to be watching. And there's that kind of duality there and that borderline, and Ben stepping over the line, and having coming to terms to what the agenda is at the end of episode three; we don't have to understand [the terrorists], we have to stop them and that is actually an important moment for the character.

— Alex Lanipekun

The episode also introduces a story-arc, about Sugarhorse, that would be resolved by the end of the seventh series. Hermione Norris describes Sugarhorse as "a group of spies who were brought together after the ending of the cold war to infiltrate, at the highest level, all forms of Russian intelligence so that if a nuclear power ever came into being and was at the hands of the Russian people, MI5 and MI6 could infiltrate it and stop it." The cast read the brief on Sugarhorse, but were then told to shred it in order to maintain its secrecy from fans.

In a flashback sequence of the episode, Lucas is subjected to waterboarding, a method of torture. In order to ensure the authenticity of the sequence, Armitage was subjected to the actual torture. He agreed to perform the sequence after he was convinced by consultants from the FSB and CIA. Armitage was only waterboarded for a short time, and was filmed in slow motion to make it appear as if he was on for longer. Kudos film and television, the production company behind Spooks, had to follow several health and safety provisions from an advisor to ensure the sequence strictly adheres to the advice. The advisor and a medic were present during filming. The ambient temperature of the room was raised to make Armitage as comfortable as possible. However, after the sequence was shot, Armitage changed his opinion entirely, stating; "I only lasted five to ten seconds, and the sound of my voice crying out to stop isn't me acting."

== Broadcast and reception ==
The episode was originally broadcast on the digital channel BBC Three from 11 pm on Tuesday, 28 October 2008, after the broadcast of the second episode on BBC One. The episode would later be repeated on BBC One on Monday, 3 November 2008 during the 9 pm to 10 pm time slot, except in Northern Ireland, where it was withheld until 10:35 pm. There is no ratings data available for the BBC Three broadcast. On the BBC One broadcast, the episode was seen by 5.2 million viewers, an improvement of 140,000 from the previous episode, with a 21.6 per cent audience share, winning its time slot against the return of detective series Taggart on ITV1, and other terrestrial channels. According to the Broadcasters' Audience Research Board, the episode received final viewing figures of 5.59 million, making the episode the 17th most seen broadcast on BBC One, and 32nd in overall television the week it was shown.

Mof Gimmers of TV Scoop was positive towards the episode, calling it "a tense week for Section D" and added "our guys did a pretty good job." Gimmers also thought Ben "did well on his first undercover mission too, didn't you think? Apart from verging on sympathy for the young brainwashed bombers. Still, he's young. He'll get over it." On Ros' role in the episode, Gimmers said "I don't think I'll ever be able to say I'm "warming" to such an ice queen as Ros, but I will admit to a growing admiration." Scott Matthewman of The Stage stated "the seventh series of the spy show continues apace," and praised the episode for "the superb performance of Hermione Norris as Ros Myers, fast becoming the twisted moral centre of the show. Both she and Peter Firth's Harry Pearce get some great dialogue every week, so it's a shame that the rest of the cast aren’t afforded the same luxury."

The Guardian columnist Zoe Williams criticised the actual waterboarding in the torture scene, saying "it's really unpleasant, [Armitage] concurred. 'I only lasted five to 10 seconds, and the sound of my voice crying out to stop isn't me acting.' Pal, that's nice that you're not showing off but this is all wrong and despicable: it's like locking yourself and 10 friends into a loo on a commuter train, to see what it would be like on the train to Auschwitz. If you can make it stop whenever you like, you're learning nothing and kicking people in the face while you're at it."
