= Spooks series 8 =

8th series of the British television show Spooks

Spooks
- Season 8
- No. of episodes: 8

Release
- Original network: BBC One; BBC Three
- Original release: 4 November – 23 December 2009

Series chronology
- ← Previous; Series 7 Next → Series 9

The eighth series of the BBC espionage television series Spooks began broadcasting on 4 November 2009 before ending on 23 December 2009. The series consists of eight episodes.

== Cast ==
=== Main ===
- Hermione Norris as Ros Myers
- Richard Armitage as Lucas North
- Miranda Raison as Jo Portman (episodes 1–3)
- Shazad Latif as Tariq Masood
- Hugh Simon as Malcolm Wynn-Jones (episode 1)
- Nicola Walker as Ruth Evershed
- Peter Firth as Harry Pearce

=== Guests ===
- Genevieve O'Reilly as Sarah Caulfield
- Robert Glenister as Nicholas Blake
- Brian Protheroe as Samuel Walker
- Tobias Menzies as Andrew Lawrence
- Peter Sullivan as Viktor Sarkisian

== Episodes ==
No. overall	No. in series	Title	Directed by	Written by	Original release date	UK viewers (millions)
65	1	"Episode 1"	Alrick Riley	Story by : Zinnie Harris and Ben Richards; Teleplay by : Ben Richards	4 November 2009 (BBC One)	6.55
Harry, who has been kidnapped by Viktor Sarkisiian and his (ex-)FSB agents, is sold to Indian intelligence officers disguised as an Islamic terror group. The terror group murders Sarkisiian and his men, then release staged footage of Harry's apparent execution. Section D uncovers the deception and resolves to find Harry. Group leader Amish Mani, a former Indian intelligence officer, wants Harry to divulge the location of a uranium shipment Harry had prevented from being planted in Iraq to justify the war. The group targets Ruth Evershed, who lives in Cyprus with her husband and stepson; she is the only other person to know the location of the uranium. After returning to London, she and her family are kidnapped from an MI-5 safehouse, and Ruth's partner is killed to get her to talk. Lucas and Ros track an MI-6 agent, Stephen Hillier, and the retiring CIA liaison officer, Libby McCall, who were part of the uranium planting scheme. Hillier is assassinated by McCall before Hillier can tell Ros the location of Harry. Lucas persuades Sarah Caulfield, McCall's successor at the London CIA station, to plant a tracker on McCall. The MI-5 team tracks McCall to the warehouse where Mani is holding Harry and Ruth. Lucas kills the leader. Malcolm saves Ruth's stepson. Harry returns to the Grid. Malcolm retires.
66	2	"Episode 2"	Alrick Riley	Story by : Zinnie Harris and Ben Richards; Teleplay by : Ben Richards	6 November 2009 (BBC Three) (Note: "Series 8, Episode 2" onward would air from 11 November 2009 onwards on BBC One)	5.11
When a gas processing plant explodes, the UK allies itself with Tazbekstan to buy its gas. Caulfield tells Lucas that the US and Russian governments are opposed. However, with supplies dwindling, Rustam Urazov, the Tazbek minister in charge of negotiation, is stalling. The minister orders the assassination of Matthew Plowden, a British journalist critical of Tazbek human rights violations. MI-5 arrives too late to save him. The minister also orders a hit on Bibi Saparova, a Tazbek human rights activist whose sister had been tortured and murdered by Urazov. Malcolm's replacement, Tariq Masood, develops sophisticated eavesdropping equipment hidden in a book of matches that Lucas uses to overhear the Tazbeks discussing their plans at a club. Jo tries to get Ruth to talk to Harry; she thinks this will help him manage his stress. Tariq figures out Urazov is planning to strike against his own country to become Prime Minister. Jo recruits Saparova to kill Urazov. Although she succeeds, the Russians have recorded the actions and use the photos to disrupt negotiations. The Russians, however, are willing to sell the UK the gas in exchange for intelligence to be used against Tazbekstan. A romance between Lucas and Caulfield develops. Blake, the Home Secretary, informs Harry of a top secret meeting in Basel, Switzerland regarding a new world order, codenamed "Nightingale".
67	3	"Episode 3"	Sam Miller	Christian Spurrier and Sean Reilly	13 November 2009 (BBC Three)	5.26
Ros is undercover at a secret meeting of some of the world's most wealthy businessmen. Armed terrorists seize the meeting, which is taking place at Russian billionaire Leon Gevitsky's London mansion. Harry gets the Home Secretary to resolve Ruth's legal troubles, and has her rejoin MI-5. The terrorists take the hostages to an underground basement, and put them on "trial" for their abuses of power, streaming this over the Internet. They also release CIA documents showing embarrassing agreements between the businessmen and the US government. Internet viewers who observe the first trial vote on the businessman's guilt. He is convicted, and shot. The Home Secretary is pressured by the CIA to end the siege or the US (or Russians or Chinese) will bomb the site to stop further damaging revelations. Harry does not want an armed response because everyone held hostage will die, including Ros. The Home Secretary overrules Harry. Tracing Internet connections and documents, Tariq and Ruth link the terrorists to a corrupt lawyer who works for Vadim Robinov, a Russian billionaire who is a business rival of Leon Gevitsky, one of the captured businessmen. Robinov is underwriting the anti-capitalist terror group to advance his business interests in Russia. Lucas visits Robinov's home, and forces him to call the leader of the terror cell to end the siege, but the leader initially refuses. Ros persuades Nina Gevitsky, a young, unstable member of the terror group and the niece of Leon, to reactivate the lift. Harry orders Jo to attempt to stop the incident. She descends, unarmed, into the bunker, to negotiate an end to the siege. The action gets out of control. She grabs hold of the leader before he can detonate C4 explosives while Ros, using a gun wrestled from the niece, shoots. The bullet passes through him, and into Jo, killing them both.
68	4	"Episode 4"	Sam Miller	David Farr	20 November 2009 (BBC Three)	5.18
Lucas's interrogator/torturer, Darshavin, escapes from a British immigration centre and demands to speak with Lucas regarding an attack planned by Sudanese terrorists backed by the FSB. They meet, and Darshavin informs Lucas about the attack without the detail. Darshavin demands a British passport and $1 million in unmarked notes in exchange for information on the exact location. Harry displays doubts, believing Lucas developed Stockholm syndrome from his capture. Samuel Walker, Caulfield's CIA boss, tells her to continue her affair with Lucas for intelligence. Lucas goes off-grid to get the target, meeting Darshavin at Lucas's flat, but Caulfield interrupts. After Darshavin leaves, he hides in her car, and abducts her as she phones Walker. Tariq and Ruth discover the location of the bombs from an asset who left a clue on the Web. Harry learns that Darshavin let a Sudanese terrorist go when interrogating him in Russia, only for him to join the terrorist plot. Ros tracks a terrorist to a room in a squat but he is killed by his own men, who escape. Lucas negotiates with Darshavin and gets the trigger code so Ros cam disarm the explosives. Darshavin tells Lucas that there was recently a secret meeting in Basel attended by rogue Western intelligence agents and agents from China. MI-5 hand Darshavin back to the FSB. Before Walker can reveal details of "Nightingale", Caulfield throws him over a railing to his death.
69	5	"Episode 5"	Alrick Riley	Richard McBrien	27 November 2009 (BBC Three)	4.39
Walker's death is suspected as suicide. Harry is sceptical, because Walker had set up a meeting with him just before the "suicide", and Michael Braydon, a second CIA officer, unexpectedly dies. It is revealed Ros's mentor, Jack Colville, is responsible for the death of the second officer and suspected of killing Walker. In the guise of giving Ros his memoirs, Colville plants a bug, and becomes able to access MI-5 records. He identifies his next target, former MI-6 agent Roger Maynard. Caulfield exploits the presence of Colville to cover up her murder of Walker. After Ros and Lucas fail to save Colville's next target, they realise that two of the targets, Braydon and Maynard, are connected to a Balkans operation that led to the death of Colville's girlfriend. Tariq creates a mirror of the MI-5 database, allowing Ros to fool Colville into thinking she sanctioned the girlfriend's death. After a showdown between the two, he kills himself realising it is the system, not the officers, at fault. Lucas discovers that Sarah murdered Walker.
70	6	"Episode 6"	Edward Hall	Dennis Kelly	4 December 2009 (BBC Three)	5.11
In a safe house, MI-5 are questioning Ryan Baisley about his former employer Dewitts Bank, whose depositors include corrupt government officials (including money for the Basel conspirators). Baisley is smoking outside when assassins invade, killing the MI-5 officers. Baisley escapes, and thinks he can make a deal with the bank; but unknown to him the assassins were hired by the bank and have murdered his wife and young son. The Home Secretary, Blake, informs Harry that the government must seize accounts at Dewitts to make an interest payment, otherwise the economy may collapse. Lucas, posing as a Russian oligarch, visits Irvin Perrot, the bank's president, and plants a bug in his highly secure computer. While Ros pursues Baisley, Ruth and Harry question her mental state after Jo's death. She finds Baisley and attempts to bring him in; however, two assassins interfere. In the cross-fire, Baisley escapes. Ros seizes Perrot, and suspends him on a noose to get him to disclose where the assassins, who are ex-intelligence agents, have learned that Baisley is headed. She finds him at Liverpool Street Station. Two assassins make another attempt on his life. Ros and armed police protect him. As he is about to enter an MI-5 car, he hears on the radio that his wife and child are dead. He is brought to Thames House, and gives up the corrupt accounts. Meanwhile, in her apartment Lucas confronts Caulfield about her involvement in Basel. He sees one of the assassins approaching, surprises him and takes him prisoner; Caulfield, however, kills him. She disarms Lucas, and holds a gun to his head. She says she must kill him or be killed by the Nightingale organisation. But she escapes before explaining anything. After money is transferred to the Treasury, Blake is forced to resign on account of set-up evidence that identifies him as having $4 million in Dewitts. Tariq discovers that the money involved in Basel and deposited in Dewitts has disappeared to Pakistan.
71	7	"Episode 7"	Edward Hall	James Dormer	11 December 2009 (BBC Three)	3.99 (Note: The episode did not appear in the top 30 viewings on the BARB website, only overnight ratings data would be available)
After a Pakistani intelligence officer is murdered, Harry and Ros learn from the UK chief of Pakistani intelligence (ISI) of a radical Hindu group preparing to attack Muslims in London. Harry tells the chief that the matter is now MI-5's job, and has the chief identify the ISI asset that infiltrated the cell as Ashok Veerkal, a 17-year-old ethnically Indian Muslim with a Hindu name. He had befriended the group at football training. Lucas contacts the lad for help. Harry and Ros tell the new Home Secretary Andrew Lawrence about the cell but withhold much information in case the Home Secretary is linked to Nightingale. The cell's leader, Harish Dhillon, has a sister who has been comatose since a Muslim-initiated attack, and is planning a revenge assault on a Mosque. Searching the vanished Caulfield's apartment, Lucas finds a flash drive that Tariq partially deciphers, learning that the cell's handler, Victor Chatterjee, is running Dhillon as well as a Muslim cell planning to attack Hindus, to pit both groups against each other. They suspect Chatterjee is likely to be a Nightingale operative. Just as the plan is about to go into effect, Chatterjee changes the target from the mosque to a girls' school. With MI-5 having traced Chatterjee's calls, Ros finds him in an empty garage, and under threat of sending him to jail and torture in Pakistan, finds out the attack locations. CO-19 officers (Metropolitan Police Service Specialist Firearm Command) stop the Muslim cell. The Home Secretary, wanting to avoid a bloodbath involving Muslim girls, orders MI-5 not to interfere, preferring to negotiate. Lucas disregards the Home Secretary's order. Dhillon pours petrol on the floor of the room in which the hostages are being held, but Lucas enters the room, and stops Dhillon. Section D piece together that Nightingale is planning to provoke India and Pakistan into war.
72	8	"Episode 8"	Alrick Riley	Ben Richards	23 December 2009 (BBC One)	5.91
Pakistan seizes an Indian submarine. Home Secretary Lawrence arranges for a meeting in London between President Mudasser of Pakistan and the president of India. Because of the risk of a nuclear exchange, the British Prime Minister and the American secretary of state meet at Chequers. Section D has a week to stop the potential nuclear war, and is also investigating links with "Nightingale". Unclear as to why Nightingale orchestrated Home Secretary Blake's departure, Harry tests the new Home Secretary by having Ros give him a flash drive that will pass to President Mudasser; if it is given to a Nightingale operative, Tariq will be able to trace it. Lucas breaks into the home of a Nightingale money man to plant a bug, but is intercepted by Sarah; Russell Price, head of CIA in Europe had ordered Sarah to kill Lucas. Sarah offers Lucas a deal to escape to another country where they can reunite but Ros enters; after a fray, Sarah escapes. A Chinese diplomat who is in the pragmatist camp meets Ruth to give her information on their disagreement with hardliners; he is assassinated. Tariq traces Sarah's whereabouts; she is brought in after Ros shoots her in the leg, and put under guard. She explains that the nuclear exchange Nightingale is precipitating will eliminate Al-Qaeda and the Taliban from Pakistan, and make India a greatly weakened state. A Nightingale agent kills her guard, and assassinates her. After a fight, Lucas and Ros capture the agent alive. Tariq puts a trace on the agent's phone, who must, as instructed, call in the kill. They learns that Price is the lead Nightingale operative. Nightingale kills an Indian officer, and plant a bomb in her room at the hotel where Mudasser and the Home Secretary are meeting. When Ros and Lucas find the two, they discover that Nightingale has paralysed them. Lucas evacuates the President, who recovers and orders the release of the submarine. However, Ros fails to evacuate Lawrence in time, and the hotel blows up.
