= Series 8, Episode 1 (Spooks) =

- Spooks episode
- Episode no.: Series 8 Episode 1
- Directed by: Alrick Riley
- Story by: Ben Richards & Zinnie Harris
- Teleplay by: Ben Richards
- Original air date: 4 November 2009
- Running time: 59 minutes

Guest appearances
- Robert Glenister as Nicholas Blake; Peter Sullivan as Viktor Sarkisiian; Ace Bhatti as Amish Mani; Andrew Scarborough as Stephen Hillier; Luke Tzortzis as Nico; Daniel Rabib as George; Paul Birchard as Libby McCall

Episode chronology
← Previous "Nuclear Strike"	Next → "Series 8, Episode 2"
- Spooks (series 8)

The series eight premiere is the first episode in the eighth series of the British espionage television series Spooks, and the 65th episode in total. It was originally broadcast on BBC One on 4 November 2009. The episode was written by Ben Richards and directed by Alrick Riley. It continues from the seventh series finale, where Sir Harry Pearce (Peter Firth) is willingly captured by Viktor Sarkisiian (Peter Sullivan). In this episode, Harry is taken by Amish Mani (Ace Bhatti), a former Indian intelligence officer, who wants Harry to reveal the location of a secret uranium shipment he knows the location of, in order to build nuclear weapons.

The episode marks the return of Nicola Walker as Ruth Evershed, who departed in the fifth series. Although there was media coverage on her return months before the broadcast of the episode, the producers were confident that only the "die hard" fans would be aware of this. It also marked the last regular appearance of Hugh Simon as Malcolm Wynn-Jones. The episode was filmed in April 2009 and was partially shot on location in Deià, Majorca. The episode was seen by over six million viewers in the United Kingdom, a quarter of the television audience during its time slot. Critics praised Ruth's return, though reactions towards the overall episode were mixed.

== Plot ==
Following his abduction, Viktor Sarkisiian sells Harry to Amish Mani in order to start a new life outside the FSB. However, Mani does not hold his end of the deal and kills Sarkisiian and his team. His men then pose as members of extremist group, the Sacred Army for Righteous Vengeance, and supposedly execute him. When MI5 later intercepts the footage of his execution from the Internet, the team are divided between those who believe it is genuine, and those who believe it is faked. Malcolm later discovers that one of the "terrorists" said a curse word in Malayalam, the language of the Indian state of Kerala. Because there is no history with SARV from that particular region, the team question whether or not the terrorists are from SARV. Furthermore, when they find the house where the execution was filmed, forensics find several traces of blood, none of which match Harry's DNA, indicating he is still alive.

Meanwhile in Polis, Cyprus, Ruth is living at peace with husband George (Daniel Rabib) and stepson Nico (Luke Tzortzis). When she notices men are out to capture her, she and her family flee to London. Upon returning to the Grid, Ruth believes Harry was kidnapped because of a secret operation in which he, MI6 officer Stephen Hillier (Andrew Scarborough), former CIA liaison Libby McCall (Paul Birchard) and Mani intend to vindicate the Iraq War by planting weapons-grade uranium in Baghdad and later "discover" it, though Harry would later pull the operation and safeguard the shipment at a secret location only he and Ruth know; those who kidnapped Harry wish to acquire the uranium to create nuclear weapons. Soon, while being transferred to a safe house, Ruth is captured and brought to Harry, while George and Nico are taken to the safe house unaware of what is happening. To save them, Ruth reveals the uranium is at a base in Norfolk, however Mani reveals he searched the base and it is no longer there, and hence orders George's execution.

Ros Myers (Hermione Norris) confronts Hillier, but the latter is assassinated by McCall before he can divulge the location of the safe house. Malcolm finds the safe house and arrives there, offering himself in exchange for Nico. Meanwhile, Lucas North (Richard Armitage) persuaded McCall's replacement, Sarah Caufield (Genevieve O'Reilly), to have a tracker implanted on McCall. The team follow him to the warehouse and arrest him. Witnessing this, Mani tells his man to kill Nico, though Malcolm is able to talk him out of it. As Mani prepares to kill Ruth, Lucas arrives in time to kill him. In the end, Malcolm wishes to retire, telling Harry he is "dog tired"; Harry allows it.

== Production ==
=== Writing and casting ===
I walked through the doors onto the grid and thought it would be exactly the same, but of course everything has changed, I kept walking into rooms thinking they were cupboards or toilets but they've become other rooms since I left.

— Nicola Walker on her return to Spooks

The episode marks the return of Ruth Evershed since her departure halfway through series five. Actress Nicola Walker left the series to raise her baby. When Walker was asked to return, she took "about half a second to say yes." Upon returning, she noticed that the Grid set changed since her initial departure. Because there was media coverage reporting Walker's return, the producers believed that the shock of her return would be hindered somewhat, but also believed only the "die hard" fans of the series would be aware of it. Ace Bhatti, who portrayed the episode's primary antagonist Amish Mani, was cast because the producers were impressed by his highly convincing and relaxed acting style, which they felt would establish his role in the episode.

Paul Birchard was cast as Libby McCall because the producers believed he acted like a "dinosaur" from the former Bush administration. Child actor Luke Tzortzis was cast as Nico since they were impressed with his intelligence and the fact he is a "strong" actor; children are often hard to work with in the series, but in Tzortzis' case, he would ask the production crew several questions between takes in order to do understand what he is to do in the episode. It was also Tzortzis' first performance as an actor, having no past experiences.

Ben Richards wrote the episode. The main focus for the first ten minutes of the episode was the debate of whether Harry would be dead or alive. The producers decided to tease the audience by showing Harry alive, but then show him apparently executed before the main title sequence, which would make them question whether or not he survived. The producers also wanted to reflect this to the characters, and divide them between if the execution was real or fake. This development was not originally included in the script, and filming was already completed at the time. However, according to director Alrick Riley, Richards was quickly able to write those new scenes "seamlessly" into the rest of the episode, which is usually a difficult task to perform. Richards also added hints in the script that Malcolm would be leaving by the end. The primary plot of the episode were hard to do, but producer Chris Fry noted that Richards was able to execute the plot very well. Elsewhere, the episode would show Ruth living happily in Cyprus and then be quickly drawn back into the world of MI5 back at a "dark" and "grim" London. The conversations between Malcolm and Ruth were all automated dialogue replacement. Following the writing, Walker and Peter Firth were highly looking forward to play their scenes together again.

=== Filming and post-production ===
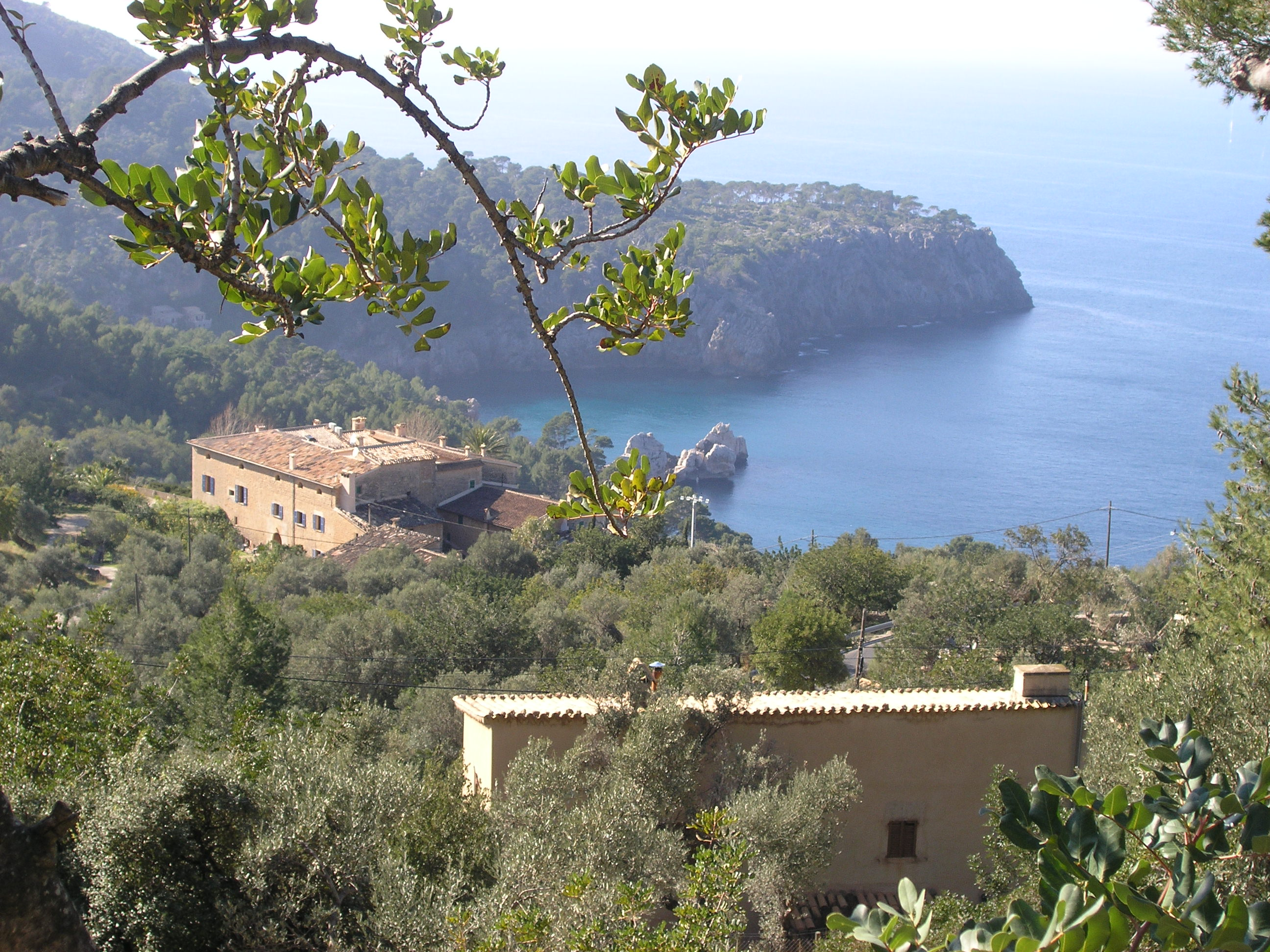
A few scenes were shot on location in Deià, Majorca, which the producers believed was a suitable surrogate for Cyprus.

Filming took place throughout April 2009. Before it began, production designer Anthony Ainsworth partly reconstructed the Grid set to give it more of a concrete, underground bunker, feel. Though more television series in the UK are adopting high-definition cameras, the Spooks producers decided to continue using hand held standard-definition ones, which were more compact and flexible; the producers felt that using high-definition cameras would sacrifice the filming style of the series. For instance, a hand held camera would allow the crew to film one long take following cast members through tight spaces, like an average London flat. High-definition cameras would lose that ability.

Two days were dedicated towards shooting the pre-title sequence. It was filmed on location at Hedsor House in Buckinghamshire. The helicopter scenes took place inside an actual helicopter taking flight with some cast members on board, which would make the sequence more genuine as opposed to having the cast members sitting inside next to a green screen. The fight sequences between Sarkisiian's and Mani's men were orchestrated and performed by stunt coordinator Chrispin Leyfield and his stunt team, as there was very little time to train conventional actors. Director Alrick Riley wanted the fight sequences to be performed in the same style as in the Jason Bourne films. The abandoned warehouse used to hold Harry and Ruth were filmed in an abandoned leather factory near London Bridge. One of the meetings between Lucas and Sarah Caufield were originally intended to be shot on the London Eye, a location the producers had never used before. However, due to restrictions the filming crew felt they could not follow, it was shot in South Bank, opposite the Houses of Parliament, instead.

The scenes set in Cyprus were filmed on location in Deià, a coastal village in the island of Majorca. Previously working on a film using the same location, producer Chris Fry chose the village because he felt it was the closest to the UK the crew can get to mimic the hot, Mediterranean feel of Cyprus, although Ruth is seen driving a left-hand drive car on the right hand side of the road, whereas Cyprus drives on the left. Because filming abroad tend to be costly for a BBC budget, the producers kept costs down as much as possible by using a limited crew with some local help. Much of the original script was to take place inside a house, but because there were no gaffers responsible for lighting, and that the weather was decent, filming took place primarily outside because of the natural sunlight. The filming crew spent four days at the end of April shooting in Majorca.

Jamie Pearson was responsible for editing the episode. The sequence where Lucas rescues Harry and Ruth near the end were made in slow motion, because the producers felt it would add to the tension. The incidental music was composed by Paul Leonard-Morgan. The computer graphics on the episode were designed by Mark Doman. The producers ended up being receptive of both Morgan and Doman's work, because of their ability to help interpret the story via the music, and computers, respectively.

== Broadcast and reception ==
=== Broadcast and ratings ===
The episode was originally broadcast on BBC One, during the 9 pm to 10 pm time slot on Wednesday, 4 November 2009, and later repeated on BBC Three at 12:15 am on 5 November. Upon its original broadcast, the episode received unofficial overnight viewing figures of 6 million and an audience share of 25 per cent. Spooks won its time slot against ITV1's UEFA Champions League game, which attracted 5.1 million viewers. According to the Broadcasters' Audience Research Board, the episode received final figures of 6.549 million viewers, placing Spooks the sixth most seen programme on BBC One the week it aired. The repeat on BBC Three attracted 602,000 viewers. In addition, 446,900 viewed the episode from BBC iPlayer, an Internet television service; as a result the episode became the seventeenth best performed iPlayer broadcast of 2009.

=== Critical reception ===
Gerard O'Donovan of The Daily Telegraph lamented the eleven months that passed since the series seven cliffhanger, and stated that "for all its square-jawed silliness and bonkers conspiracies, Spooks still delivers high-class escapism at its slickest, most glamorous and entertaining." Adam Sweeting of The Arts Desk felt that the episode's plot was "mere background noise," and that the series "is about hilariously artificial encounters between the characters, clumsily manufactured dramatic tension, and a denouement involving someone being prevented in the nick of time from detonating something/killing somebody/triggering a global economic collapse." Andrea Mullaney of The Scotsman said that the plot was "all gibberish," but cited the episode was really about the return of Ruth, a development Mullaney praised, stating Ruth "has been much missed since she was framed and sent into faked-death exile." Mullaney also praised the performance of the cast, including "Walker's gulping hysteria when Ruth's husband was executed," which was "perfectly done," and Malcolm's "doughty attempts to comfort a small boy in danger were touching."

Robert McLaughlin of Den of Geek believed that it is "equivalent to 24," "far more engaging than the last James Bond movie," and that it is "good to see [Ruth Evershed] again," seeing how "the re-introduction of an old character will work with the new additions." While also reviewing Channel 4's The Family, Tom Sutcliff of The Independent stated that family values were "relevant in Spooks too," citing Ruth being "on the rack," after having her see her husband killed and adoptive son threatened. Though Sutcliff did not see the series with "great diligence recently," he thought the intelligence was "not the quality you would attribute to some of the strategies employed" in the episode. Vicky Frost of The Guardian was overly critical of the episode, criticising it for the reunion between Ruth and Harry, which she stated "wasn't quite the romantic occasion [I would have] liked," and Malcolm's method to convince a "trained killer not to shoot Nico." Overall, Frost thought the episode was "medium" and rated it five out of ten on the "ridiculous-o-meter".
