= Tip-off =

Tip-off may refer to:

- Tip-off, jump ball starting a period in basketball
- Tip Off, 1991 basketball video game

== See also ==
- The Tip-Off (disambiguation)
