= Qualtrough =

Qualtrough is a surname. Notable people with the surname include:

- Carla Qualtrough (born 1971), Canadian politician and swimmer
- Joseph Davidson Qualtrough (1885–1960), Manx politician

== Fictional characters ==
- Bernard Qualtrough, a spy on the television drama Spooks

== Other ==
- R M Qualtrough, assumed name of a telephone caller to William Herbert Wallace
