= Nuclear strike (disambiguation) =

Nuclear strike may refer to:

- Nuclear warfare, a military conflict or political strategy in which nuclear weaponry is used to inflict damage on the enemy
- Nuclear Strike, an installment in the Strike series of video games
- "Nuclear Strike" (Spooks), a 2008 episode of the BBC television series Spooks
