= Uhiara =

Uhiara is a surname. Notable people with the surname include:

- Ofo Uhiara (born 1975), British actor of Nigerian descent
- Ony Uhiara (born 1978/79), English actress of Nigerian descent
