= Series 8, Episode 4 (Spooks) =

- Spooks episode
- Episode no.: Series 8 Episode 4
- Directed by: Sam Miller
- Written by: David Farr
- Original air dates: 20 November 2009 (BBC Three); 25 November 2009 (BBC One)
- Running time: 59 minutes

Guest appearances
- Emil Hoștină as Oleg Darshavin; Brian Protheroe as Samuel Walker; Gerard Murphy as Boris Gulyanov; Victoria McCumiskey as Receptionist; Laura Pyper as Young Woman

Episode chronology
← Previous "Series 8, Episode 3"	Next → "Series 8, Episode 5"
- Spooks (series 8)

The fourth episode of series eight of the British espionage television series Spooks is the 69th episode in the overall series. It was originally broadcast on BBC Three on 20 November 2009, later repeated on BBC One on 25 November. The episode was written by David Farr, and directed by Sam Miller. In the episode, one of Lucas North's (Richard Armitage) former interrogators, FSB officer Oleg Darshavin (Emil Hoștină), approaches Lucas regarding an upcoming terrorist attack. The episode also continues the story-arc of "Nightingale", a shadow organisation bent on a New World Order, and reveals that CIA liaison Sarah Caufield is a part of it. A little over five million people tuned in to watch the episode following its BBC One broadcast. It was met with generally positive reviews.

== Plot ==
The episode begins with Ros Myers (Hermione Norris) haunted by the death of Jo Portman (Miranda Raison) from the previous episode; Jo held a terrorist long enough for Ros to shoot him, though the bullet passed through him and entered her chest. Meanwhile, Oleg Darshavin breaks out of an immigration detention facility following a riot. As Section D review the CCTV footage, Lucas quickly recognises Darshavin, who mouths Lucas' name, indicating he intends for them to meet. Lucas reminisces that during his imprisonment in Russia, he developed a bond with Darshavin and mentioned wanting to go birdwatching in the Thames Estuary. During the meeting alone, Darshavin reveals he knows of a planned terrorist attack by Sudanese extremists and will reveal the time and location in exchange for a passport and one million pounds in mixed currencies.

Throughout the episode, Harry Pearce (Peter Firth) believes Lucas developed Stockholm syndrome during his capture. His suspicions are solidified when Lucas takes off his wire and goes off the radar while walking to meet him again with the passport. The two meet in Lucas' flat, where Darshavin reveals the leader of the cell goes by Omar Salim al Khaled. Their meeting is then disrupted when his girlfriend, CIA liaison Sarah Caufield (Genevieve O'Reilly), enters. Lucas is angered to discover she is attempting to bug his flat and pushes her out; Darshavin would later kidnap her. Ruth Evershed (Nicola Walker) and Tariq Masood (Shazad Latif) look into this and find a link between al Khaled and Onelight, a charity front he used to recruit members. One of Malcolm Wynn-Jones' former assets, who is in hiding out of fear from the terrorist, left Ruth subtle clues leading to the time and location of the attack.

Ros locates al Khaled's residence but witnesses him getting killed by a sniper. The bug in his flat revealed that in a phone conversation just before the hit, Lucas discovers that Darshavin was the killer, and is a part of the cell. He later receives a call from Darshavin, threatening to kill Sarah if he does not deliver the money. As Ros races to stop the bomb going off at the Square Mile, Lucas meets up with Darshavin back at the Estuary, and is able to break him into revealing the disarming code, before Lucas delivers him back to the FSB. Before he is delivered however, Darshavin attempts to bargain his way out by revealing details of a secret meeting in Basel, Switzerland from "Nightingale", something Harry is already aware of in a previous episode.

In a secondary story, Harry asks London's CIA director Samuel Walker (Brian Protheroe) for help on looking into the meeting. During his investigation, he discovers that one of his officers is involved. Before he can find out who, Sarah kills Walker by pushing Walker off the top floor of the building. This reveals that Sarah is a member of Nightingale.

== Production ==
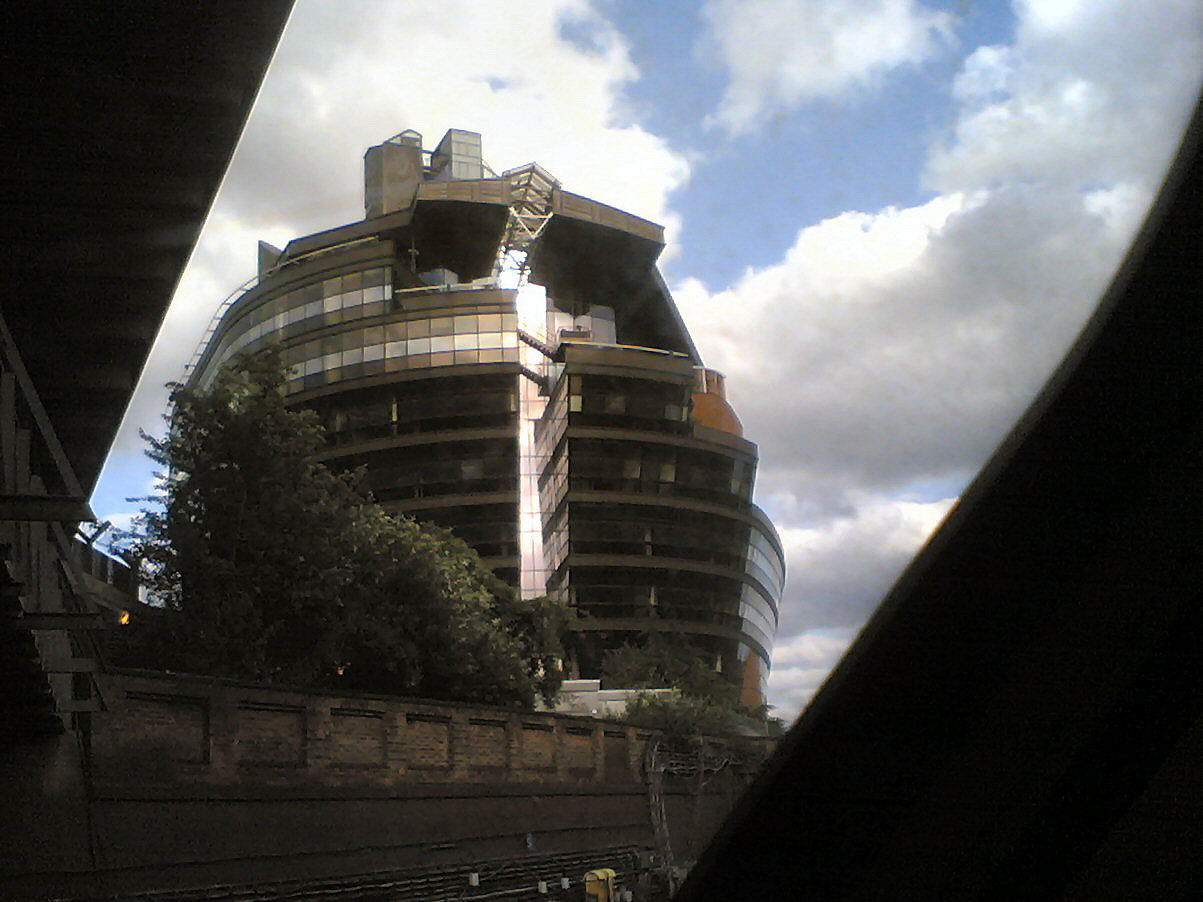
The stunt where Walker fell to his death was filmed at the London Ark.

The episode includes more shots of Richard Armitage wearing tattoos, which took two hours to apply "on a good day". However, they tend to "break up if you sweat". Armitage was told to stand still and "not touch anything", and they "rub off on the sheets". Several scenes were filmed involving Lucas's interrogation, although only some were included within the final episode.

The scene where Sarah pushed Walker was filmed at the top floor of the London Ark. The stunt took three hours to set up. To use Protheroe as much as possible, a breakaway balcony was used. The stunt was performed by Gordon Seed, who performed an 80-foot fall before, but onto water. Because of the building's layout, it was impractical to use wires, so Seed had to perform a free fall onto an air bag at the bottom. Beforehand, weights were dropped down until the crew were satisfied Seed would survive the fall. Four separate camera angles were used to shoot the scene.

== Broadcast and reception ==
I did [...] very much enjoy the classic spying methods in evidence in Waterstones; the economy with which the tension between Harry and Ruth is being played out; the moment when Sarah let herself into Lucas's flat – and threw her boss over the stairwell when he came close to uncovering her.

— Vicky Frost of The Guardian

The episode originally aired on BBC Three on 20 November 2009, and later repeated on frontline channel BBC One on 25 November, both cases airing during the 9pm to 10pm timeslot. Though there is no available data concerning the ratings following the BBC Three broadcast, the BBC One broadcast received total viewing figures of 5.18 million, making Spooks the thirteenth most seen programme for BBC One, and 34th overall in British television the week it aired

Vicky Frost of The Guardian thought the introduction was "a relatively tame start to proceedings", and that the episode was "tightly plotted, deft and exciting", and the final twist was "marvellous", but believed that there were "one too many plots for an hour of Spooks", and that the backstory of Lucas "all seemed rather a missed opportunity." Robert McLaughlin of Den of Geek noted that Lucas "spends a lot of this episode in a state of undress", and that while it was "a more personal episode, there are some huge implications set up and executed for the rest of the series, and while it might seem a waste of momentum to re-tread the imprisonment of Lucas from the beginning of last season, all the flashbacks, dabs of information and the entire setup are all relevant", concluding by stating that "Spooks continues to be one of the best shows the Beeb currently offers."
