= The Tip-Off =

The Tip-Off may refer to

- The Tip-Off (film), 1931 American comedy film
- "The Tip-Off" (Spooks), 2008 episode of the BBC television series Spooks
- The Tip Off, 1929 American silent crime drama film
