= Ofo Uhiara =

British actor

Ofo Uhiara (born 13 December 1975) is a British actor of Nigerian descent, known for his role as Police Constable Lance Powell in the British police procedural television series The Bill.

== Early life ==
Uhiara was born in East London to EJ and Jinna. He has a twin sister, while his younger sister is actress Ony Uhiara. When his father began working abroad, Uhiara attended a boarding school in Essex. He studied for a BTEC in Performing Arts, before attending the Guildhall School of Music and Drama where he studied drama.

== Career ==
Uhiara has appeared in a number of theatre and screen roles. His made his film debut in the 2001 crime comedy Lucky Break. He then appeared in Inside I'm Dancing (2004), followed by a guest role in an episode of Holby City.

Uhiara joined the main cast of The Bill as PC Lance Powell in April 2004. During his time in The Bill, Uhiara shared a flat with his co-star Natalie J. Robb. Lance was part of The Bill's first gay marriage. He was written out after a year and made his exit in November 2005.

In 2006, Uhiara played Michael Johnson in the fifth series of the BBC drama Spooks.
