= Zoe Williams (writer) =

Welsh writer (born 1973)

- Born: Zoe Abigail Williams; 7 August 1973 (age 53); Hounslow, London, England
- Education: Lincoln College, Oxford (BA)
- Occupations: Journalist, columnist, author
- Employer: The Guardian
- Children: 2

Zoe Abigail Williams (born 7 August 1973) is a British columnist, journalist, and author.

== Early life ==
Zoe Abigail Williams was born on 7 August 1973 in Hounslow, London. Williams was educated at the independent Godolphin and Latymer School for girls in London and read modern history at Lincoln College, Oxford. Her father, Mark Williams, was a forensic psychologist; he worked at Wandsworth Prison in London. Her mother was a set designer for the BBC. Her parents separated in 1976 and divorced 20 years later. Williams has an older sister and half- and step-siblings from her father's marital and extramarital relationships. Williams said her father was a petty criminal because he committed insurance fraud.

== Writing ==
Williams is a lifestyle, wellness and political journalist for The Guardian, with her Fitness in your 40s, family and political columns. Her work has also appeared in other publications, including the New Statesman, The Spectator, Now, the London Cycling Campaign's magazine London Cyclist, and The Times Literary Supplement. She is also a columnist for the London Evening Standard, for which she was a diarist writing about being a single woman in London. She reviewed restaurants for The Sunday Telegraph magazine.

In May 2011, Williams wrote about fare dodging when in her 30s while travelling on London buses. She wrote: "I actually had a lot of affection for bendy buses, mainly because evading your fare was so easy that to pay was almost missing the point. We used to call it freebussing."

=== Political ===
In 2014, Williams defended the social policy legacy of former Labour prime minister Tony Blair and denounced those calling him a war criminal. Following the death of Fidel Castro, Williams condemned his rule in Cuba, while imploring her readers to ignore his policies. In August 2015, Williams endorsed Jeremy Corbyn's campaign in the Labour Party leadership election. She wrote in The Guardian: "The point is, Corbyn doesn't have to be right about everything; he doesn't have to be certain, and fully costed about everything; he doesn't even have to be responsive and listening to everything. This political moment is about breaking open the doors and letting the 21st century in."

=== Feminism ===
Williams writes about her personal life from a feminist perspective, such as her marriages, motherhood, and her abortion.

She wrote Bring It On, Baby: How to have a dudelike pregnancy, a 2010 book of advice for mothers-to-be, which was republished in 2012 as What Not to Expect When You're Expecting.

=== Awards ===
Williams was longlisted for the Orwell Prize in 2012, and was named Columnist of the Year 2010 at the WorkWorld Media Awards.

== Broadcasting ==
Williams has appeared as a guest on television. Clive James praised her appearance in documentary Teenage Kicks: the Search for Sophistication: "The brilliant journalist Zoe Williams did a short piece to camera that was almost an aria." She has presented a radio documentary, Inside the Academy School Revolution, which Miranda Sawyer found one-sided and "tame", and hosted BBC Radio 4's What The Papers Say. She has been a panellist on the BBC's Any Questions and Question Time.

== Criticism ==
In February 2020, Williams was criticised online and in Nation.Cymru for her comments about the Welsh language. Her article on exercise criticised a particular Canadian fitness regime as "hard and existentially pointless", continuing: "all that energy spent, no distance covered: it's like eating cottage cheese or learning Welsh." Williams had previously praised the language on Twitter for giving Welsh speakers "a more international outlook".

In 2020, Kent Live reported criticism of Williams following an altercation that resulted in Williams being told to leave a Wetherspoons pub in Ramsgate, on the basis that she had broken the COVID-19 lockdown rules then in force. Williams had written about the incident in The Guardian, describing the incident as 'shameless non-compliance with rules that were introduced to protect all of us'. In 2026, she wrote about the incident again, without contrition.

== Personal life ==
Williams lives in South London with her second husband, Will Higham, and his daughter from another marriage, as well as her son and daughter who were fathered by her first husband before she married him. Williams married the father, a geologist, of her son and daughter in 2013, after ten years together, and wrote about the wedding from a feminist perspective in her column for The Guardian. In 2018, after a divorce, Williams married for the second time.

Williams became a trustee of the Butler Trust—which was established to recognise the achievements of prison service staff—in November 2013.

She is a patron of Humanists UK.
