= Peter Sullivan (actor) =

English actor (born 1964)

- Born: 26 July 1964 (age 62); Hoddesdon, Hertfordshire, England
- Website: http://www.petersullivan.tv/

Peter Sullivan (born 26 July 1964) is an English film and television actor.

== Life and career ==
Sullivan was born in Hoddesdon, Hertfordshire. In 1982, he joined the National Youth Theatre, where he played Edmond in King Lear, and then joined the Old Vic Youth Theatre playing the title role in Macbeth. He studied at Central School of Speech and Drama from 1983 to 1986 and then in New York under Uta Hagen at HB Studio.

In 1988 he joined the Catalan performance group La Fura dels Baus and toured the world with them in their trilogy of spectacles Accions, Suz/O/Suz and Tier Mon. In 1990 he was asked by Deborah Warner to join the National Theatre in London to tour King Lear and Richard III, directed by Richard Eyre, staying on to play in Napoli Millionaria as part of the Lyttelton Theatre company. He also worked extensively at the National Theatre Studio with Simon Usher and there formed The Actors' Group. He left the National to work with David Freeman, playing Pentheus in Opera Factory's Bacchae at the Queen Elizabeth Hall, before moving into television to play the lead in Dick Clement and Ian La Frenais' sit-com Over The Rainbow.

He was nominated for the Evening Standard Best Newcomer award for his portrayal of Ray in Simon Bennet's Drummers directed by Max Stafford-Clark at the New Ambassadors in London's West End. He also played SS Colonel Karl Schoengarth in the multi-award-winning B.B.C./H.B.O film Conspiracy written by Loring Mandel and directed by Frank Pierson. He then played Jack the Ripper in Jonathan Kent's revival of Wedekind's Lulu in a new version by Nicolas Wright that started at the Almeida Theatre before transferring to the Kennedy Center in Washington, D.C.

He has worked extensively for Peter Gill, appearing in both Way of the World and Certain Young Men at the Almeida Theatre, as well as in a number of plays at the Royal Court Theatre, contributing to their recent book Inside Out. At the Court he played The Husband in Debbie Tucker Green's Stoning Mary directed by Marianne Elliott, originated the role of Ferdinand in Tom Stoppard's Rock n Roll directed by Trevor Nunn, which transferred to the West End and Broadway, as well as playing Cash in Dominic Cooke's first play as artistic director, The Pain and The Itch by the American writer Bruce Norris. He played Mortensgaard in Antony Page's acclaimed revival of Ibsen's Rosmersholm in a new version by Mike Poulson, once again at the Almeida. He has played JPW for Garry Hynes in Tom Murphy's The Gigli Concert at Druid in Galway and has returned to the National to do two plays with Angus Jackson; David Hare's financial crash piece The Power of Yes and a revival of Clifford Odets' Rocket to the Moon. Most recently he has played Sir Robert Morton in Lindsey Posner's acclaimed revival of The Winslow Boy at The Old Vic and was critically acclaimed for his rediscovery of the role of Sir William Collier in The Deep Blue Sea, his seventh play at the National.

He played Cardinal Sforza in The Borgias and was Commander Laurence Stern in Abi Morgan's award-winning The Hour for the BBC. He played the leads in Sky TV's Critical, created by Jed Mercurio, and in Cuffs on BBC1. He played recurring leads in Curfew for Sky, MotherFatherSon with Richard Gere for BBC2, and was also Ralph Hanson in Series 5 of the BBC1 drama series Poldark. He will soon reoccur in Jack Thorne’s drama The Light for Channel 4, having also appeared in Thorne's miniseries The Accident for the same channel.

Sullivan played antagonist Nyle Bellamy in the 2022 BBC adaptation of adventure novel Around the World in Eighty Days by Jules Verne.

Sullivan played Julian Baxter in the 2025 TV series The Iris Affair created by Neil Cross.

He has appeared in numerous television shows, both as regular and guest characters and in a number of films, both studio pictures as well as indie films in the U.S., UK and Spain.
