= Alex Lanipekun =

British actor (born 1981)

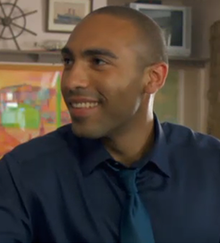
- Lanipekun on set of Being Human
- Born: Alexander Olaseni James Lanipekun; 7 April 1981 (age 45); London, England
- Occupation: Actor/Writer
- Years active: 2001–present

Alex Lanipekun (born 7 April 1981) is an English actor. He trained at the Royal Academy of Dramatic Art but left early to join the cast of the BBC drama Spooks (2007–2008) as Ben Kaplan. He has since appeared in the BBC series Troy: Fall of a City (2018) and the Sky Atlantic series Riviera (2019), Domina (2021–2023), and The Rising (2022). He is also known for his theatre work.

== Early life ==
Lanipekun was born in London, during the 1981 Brixton riot. His father is Nigerian and his mother is of half Italian and half English descent. He attained a financial scholarship to Christ's Hospital School in Horsham, West Sussex. He then attended Westminster College. Lanipekun has A-Levels in English, Psychology, History, Drama and Religious Studies. He then obtained a Grant to study for a BSc in Anthropology at University College London. After University, he attended the Royal Academy of Dramatic Art as a Grant Student. He was assisted financially by many Arts Charities and Foundations, including The Actors' Charitable Trust.

== Career ==
At age thirteen, Alex auditioned for the National Youth Music Theatre and became a member, subsequently playing the part of Leroy The Boxer in the musical adaptation of the film Bugsy Malone. At seventeen, he auditioned for the National Youth Theatre, and gained a place. It was then that he first seriously considered acting as a career.

Lanipekun was a member of the MOBO-nominated Hip-Hop Collective 'ONE' alongside producer Al Shux. The group was made up of 12 MC's and Producers, including rapper Sway. ONE released their only album, Onederful World, in 2001. ONE were nominated for a MOBO Award after reaching the final of the Unsung Competition for independent artists and although not the final winners, the group's profile had been raised within the music industry and they began to get airplay on major British radio stations.

At this time, Lanipekun was also working as a freelance journalist. Originally joining the Sony Street Team under DJ Semtex, he was given the opportunity to write for their promotional website and eventually for their magazine. He wrote reviews, and advertorials, as well as interviewing many of the Urban Division's roster of Artists. Lanipekun began freelancing more widely and was hired as the Entertainment Editor for Alexander Amosu's online magazine 'ICON'.

Alex graduated from the Royal Academy of Dramatic Art In 2007, winning the prestigious Carleton Hobbs Award, and joining the BBC Radio Drama Rep during their winter season. In 2008, Lanipekun also played Eric the Red in Wig Out! at the Royal Court Theatre, by Tarrell McCraney, directed by Dominic Cooke.

In 2009, Lanipekun played Danilo in Dimetos, by Athol Fugard, at the Donmar Warehouse with Jonathan Pryce, directed by Douglas Hodge. The play was previously last performed in 1976 with Paul Scofield in the title role and Ben Kingsley playing Danilo. The production received mixed reviews, but Charles Spencer of the Telegraph gave the play 5 stars, highlighting the central performances of Pryce and Anne Reid, as well as the young leads, Lanipekun and Holliday Grainger.

In Autumn 2010, Lanipekun returned to the stage, taking on the character of Laertes in Nicholas Hytner's production of Hamlet at the National Theatre. Alongside Rory Kinnear, David Calder, Claire Higgins and Ruth Negga the play had a sellout run and tour. It then returned to the National and finally ended in April 2011. The production and Alex's performance were critically well received, earning 5 and 4 star reviews across all the major broadsheets. The Telegraph, highlighted Lanipekun's portrayal of Laertes, and the Spectator described his performance as "outstanding". The production was also nominated for Evening Standard and Olivier Awards.

In 2013, Lanipekun played Steve in Comedy Central's new show Big Bad World, alongside Blake Harrison, Caroline Quentin and James Fleet. The series broke previous records for Comedy Central's viewing figures. He also returned to theatre, in Geraldine Alexander's play Amygdala, performing for the first time since 2011 on stage at The Print Room in Notting Hill. The reviews were generally positive, with Kate Bassett from The Times writing "Here's hoping that British theatregoers see more of Lanipekun, who is both magnetic and mercurial, switching in a flash between real tenderness and explosive rage". Between 2014 and 2015, he also played the role of Hank Wonham in series 4 and 5 of Homeland.

Lanipekun played role of DC Sean Armitage alongside Kenneth Cranham in the BBC Radio 4 show The Interrogation, written by Roy Williams and directed by Mary Peate and Jessica Dromgoole. The show ran for 8 series, and was named one of the best audio dramas of the 21st Century, by a panel of academics and radio experts.

Since 2017, Lanipekun has played Nil in the PlayStation video game "Horizon Zero Dawn". Nil is on a mission to kill all bandits and calls upon Aloy's help to do so. He reprised his role in its sequel Horizon Forbidden West, in 2022.

In 2018, he was part of the great ensemble cast, put together to tell the epic story of Homer's Iliad in Troy: Fall of a City, playing the role of Pandarus. The show was produced by Netflix/ BBC.

In 2019, he joined the Sky Atlantic show Riviera for Season 2, playing the role of Raafi Al-Qadar. The show was Sky's most successful original series, with an audience of 2.3 million an episode, and more than 20 million downloads and views total.

From 2021 to 2023, he played Tycho in the Sky Atlantic series Domina, alongside Kasia Smutniack, Matthew McNulty, and Claire Forlani. Lanipekun also joined the cast of The Rising, starring Clara Rugaard.

In 2023 he played the role of Hugo Kupka in Final Fantasy XVI, developed and published by Square Enix.

== Filmography ==
=== Film ===
Year	Title	Role	Notes	Director
2001	The Fourth Angel	Mugger 2		John Irvin
2010	Clash of the Titans	Captain	Character cut from final film.	Louis Leterrier
2011	Blitz	Precocious PC		Elliot Lester
2012	Dead Europe	Red		Tony Krawitz
2012	Twenty8k	Jude Clarke		David Kew and Neil Thompson
2014	Second Coming	Michael		Debbie Tucker Green
2014	Legacy	Alex		Davie Fairbanks/ Marc Small
2014	Resonant Frequency	Tyrone		Jonathan Birch
2016	Love Is Thicker Than Water	Llion		Ate De Jong / Emily Harris
2017	The Titan	Andrew Rutherford		Lennart Ruff
2026	Greenland 2: Migration	Riley Watson		Ric Roman Waugh

=== Television ===
Year	Title	Role	Notes	Channel
2007–2008	Spooks	Ben Kaplan	Regular 2 Series	BBC 1/BBC America
2009	Apples And Oranges	Ashley		Channel 4
2010	Being Human	Saul	2 episodes	BBC3/BBC1
2010	Beautiful People	Tiger		BBC 2
2011	Death in Paradise	Benjamin Lightfoot		BBC 1
2012	Big Bad World	Steve	Regular	Comedy Central
2012	Way To Go	Eddie		BBC 3
2012	New Cross	Andy		Channel 4
2012	The Borgias	Mohammed	2 episodes	Showtime/Sky Atlantic
2013	London Irish	Dr Lewin		Channel 4
2014	The Missing	Chris	Recurring	BBC 1
2014–2015	Homeland	Hank Bonham	4 Episodes	Showtime
2014	24: Live Another Day	James Harman	Recurring	Fox
2018	Troy: Fall of a City	Pandarus	6 Episodes	Netflix / BBC
2019	Riviera	Raafi Al-Qadar	Regular	Sky Atlantic / Sundance Now
2021- 2023	Domina	Tycho	15 episodes	Sky Atlantic
2022	Avenue 5	Isaac	2 episodes	HBO
2022	The Rising	Daniel Sands	8 episodes	Sky Atlantic

=== Theatre ===
Year	Title	Role	Venue	Director
2004	Eyes Catch Fire	Ernesto	Finborough Theatre	Daniel Nyman
2008	Wig Out!	Eric The Red	The Royal Court	Dominic Cooke
2009	Dimetos	Danilo	Donmar Warehouse	Douglas Hodge
2010/11	Hamlet	Laertes	National Theatre	Nicholas Hytner
2013	Amygdala	Joshua	The Print Room	Geraldine Alexander

=== Video games ===
Year	Title	Role
2017	Horizon Zero Dawn	Nil
2022	Horizon Forbidden West	Nil
2023	Final Fantasy XVI	Hugo Kupka

== Awards and nominations ==
Year	Award	Category	Work	Result	Ref.
2026	New Renaissance Film Festival	Emerging Talent Award	Echoes	Nominated	
2026	South London Film Festival	Best Social Impact Film	Echoes	Won	
