= Nicholas Blake (Spooks) =

The Rt Hon Nicholas Blake MP
- Spooks character
- First appearance: Series 5, Episode 1
- Last appearance: Series 9, Episode 1 (16 appearances)
- Portrayed by: Robert Glenister

In-universe information
- Gender: Male
- Occupation: Secretary of State for the Home Department (2006–2009)

Nicholas Blake MP is a fictional character in the British TV series Spooks, portrayed by British actor Robert Glenister. Blake was Home Secretary in the British government. He was regularly in contact with Harry Pearce, regarding National Security.

== History ==
He was introduced as part of the security council siding with then National Security Coordinator Juliet Shaw. He was opposed to the plans of a senior MI6 agent Michael Collingwood, Collingwood was leading a coup attempt and had a bomb planted in Blake's car. Blake survived the assassination attempt.

Blake was seen again at the beginning of Series 6 when he covertly ordered the Tehran train bomb, however, he was acting on false intelligence provided by Bob Hogan. Soon after a biological virus released from the train infected a man named Mehan Asnik. The virus was brought back to the UK. MI5 stopped this and meanwhile Blake was in negotiation with the Russians over a solution. He was then seen again later in the series when he ordered the false assassination of Section D to keep the team busy while his Policy Advisor, Jason Belling reassured Iranian Special Consul Bakshi about the team's death. Belling then convinced Bakshi about buying safe nuclear reactors which could not make nuclear bombs.

Blake reappears in Series 7, Episode 3 when Section D are tracking an active Al-Qaeda cell that is planning an attack on crowded places in London, mostly markets. Blake at first refuses to raise the national threat level, stating that the British public need good news due to the housing and financial crisis. He is seen in the House of Commons, proposing a British Day as a national holiday. Harry Pearce reveals to Ros Myers that Blake is extremely patriotic and feels proud to be British. After the Al-Qaeda crisis is resolved, Blake meets with Sir Richard, Harry's new boss, Harry and Ros. Sir Richard attempts to scapegoat Ros but Ros states that she doesn't care about what people think of her. This seemingly impresses Blake, who agrees to raise the national threat level to Severe. Blake is last seen in the House of Commons again, thanking MI5 for stopping the attacks with no civilian casualties, albeit two SO19 officers being killed. He makes a resounding speech attacking Al Qaeda, being met with roaring approval from MP's.

He also appears being briefed by Harry and Ros in Episode 4 when Al-Qaeda's number three wanted to negotiate. He was forced to allow a pardon and release of two prisoners from Guantanamo Bay prison. He is last seen in that Episode watching the TV as a House of Commons restaurant is destroyed by Al-Qaeda, however the people inside had been evacuated by Section D and the explosion was staged.

In Episode 7, where he is informed that Harry Pearce has supposedly been passing secrets to the Russians. He enters the Grid and is briefed by Director-General, Sir Richard Dolby on Harry's supposed deception. Blake talks to Harry in the interrogation room and angrily tells him he will lose everything for his betrayal. When Harry is proved innocent by Lucas North and Ros Myers, Harry is released. Soon after, he and Blake meet and share a conciliatory handshake; on Harry's recommendation, Blake awards Ben Kaplan a Distinguished Service Order (Kaplan died trying to stop the actual mole, analyst Connie James from escaping).

Finally in Episode 8, Blake is told by Harry of an imminent Russian nuclear threat with a suitcase bomb. With less than three hours until it goes off, Harry tells Blake to expect a phone call from either Harry or someone from Section D at 2:45pm. Blake was told that if he received the call, then he should evacuate Parliament, Buckingham Palace and Whitehall.

Blake received the phone call from Jo Portman at that time, after a brief conversation Jo ends the call. Blake then calls the Cabinet Office and says he is invoking Protocol Landslide, an emergency evacuation of the government and royal family to deep-level nuclear shelters. Seconds after Blake ends the call, alarms ring inside the Home Office for personnel to be evacuated. Blake is last seen, however, electing to remain at his desk, privately willing Harry to find the bomb in time.

Blake was approached by Ros Myers when she is trying to find out the truth behind Harry's disappearance. He declares that he counts Harry as a friend but that he can't do what Ros wants him to do. After the events of Episode 2, Blake approached Harry with intelligence of a meeting taking place in Basel of corrupt intelligence officers, Blake had Harry investigate this.

In Episode 6, Blake was forced to resign when the Nightingale operation falsely provided information to the media that Blake had done dodgy deals with the Mafia. Although Blake's actions throughout the day had managed to prevent Britain from going bankrupt, he resigned after a long conversation with Harry, who offered his support. He was seen pushing through press to get to his car and then being driven away. Soon afterward, Harry said of his ally's downfall: "I might have known it couldn't last – a decent politician."

He was featured in the first episode of the ninth series, being revealed as a senior member of Nightingale who ordered the hotel bombing during the Pakistan-India summit, resulting in the death of Ros Myers and Blake's successor Andrew Lawrence at the end of the Series 8 with Blake's resignation being a smokescreen to cover up his Nightingale affiliation. Harry Pearce visited him at his home in Scotland, poisoning him with tainted whisky which caused Blake to appear to die from a heart attack; before Blake died he expressed regret and sadness about Ros' death and commented that by being a member of Nightingale, he had a chance to change the system for good.

== Appearances ==
- Series 5 : Episodes 1 & 2
- Series 6 : Episodes 1, 2 & 9
- Series 7 : Episodes 3, 4, 7 & 8
- Series 8 : Episodes 1 - 6
- Series 9 : Episode 1
