= Jo Portman =

Fictional character from Spooks

- Spooks character
- First appearance: Series 4, Episode 5
- Last appearance: Series 8, Episode 3
- Portrayed by: Miranda Raison

In-universe information
- Gender: Female
- Occupation: Junior Case Officer, Section D; Former: Journalist
- Family: Mother (S05E10)

Joanna Portman (1979–2010) was a fictional Field Operative in the Counter-Terrorism department at MI5, featured in the British television series Spooks (also known as MI-5 in the United States). She was played by Miranda Raison. A former aspiring journalist, she joined the team in the fifth episode of series 4 after being recruited by Adam Carter; Jo retained her journalist occupation as her MI5 cover. She was killed in a volatile hostage situation in the third episode of the eighth series.

== Character history ==
Jo is first introduced in the fifth episode of series four. At that time, Jo is an aspiring journalist with an inquisitive instinct and becomes embroiled in an undercover operation involving Section D. She immediately recognizes that Adam Carter, at the time posing as a gas engineer, isn't all he makes out to be and her latent skills are soon put to good use, ensuring the success of Adam and his colleagues. Having earned the respect of Adam and the rest of Section D, she is offered a job as a junior case officer on the grid and gladly accepts the role.

The character dies in season 8 and her place on the team remains vacant throughout the remainder of series 8 and she is only replaced in the following series when Beth Bailey is installed as junior case officer.

=== Other appearances ===
Jo's name appears in a newspaper byline in series 3, episode 6 of the crime drama Hustle, a show devised by the same creators as Spooks.
