= Stewart Williams =

Stewart Williams may refer to:

- Stewart Williams (rugby league) (born c. 1958), English rugby league player
- E. Stewart Williams (1909–2005), American architect
- Stewart Williams, filmmaker of Tim Allsop & Stewart Williams

== See also ==
- Stuart Williams (disambiguation)
