= Dragon Age: Absolution =

2022 fantasy animated series

- The poster featuring the main characters (clockwise from upper left): Roland, Qwydion, Lacklon, Fairbanks, Miriam and Hira.
- Genre: Action; Adventure; Drama; Fantasy
- Created by: Mairghread Scott
- Based on: Dragon Age by BioWare
- Directed by: Bae Ki-Yong (Note: In this Korean name, the family name is Bae.)
- Voices of: Kimberly Brooks; Matthew Mercer; Ashly Burch; Sumalee Montano; Phil LaMarr; Keston John; Josh Keaton; Zehra Fazal
- Composer: Penka Kouneva
- Countries of origin: South Korea; Canada; United States
- Original language: English
- No. of seasons: 1
- No. of episodes: 6

Production
- Executive producers: Mairghread Scott; Chris Bain; Matthew Goldman; John Epler
- Editor: Nam Jong-Hyun (Note: In this Korean name, the family name is Nam.)
- Running time: 25–27 minutes
- Production companies: Red Dog Culture House; Netflix Animation Studios; BioWare

Original release
- Network: Netflix
- Release: December 9, 2022

Dragon Age: Absolution is an adult animated fantasy television series created by Mairghread Scott for Netflix. Produced by Red Dog Culture House under the supervision of BioWare, the series was released on December 9, 2022. Set in BioWare's Dragon Age fictional universe, it focuses on the fallout from a heist gone wrong in the Tevinter Imperium.

== Premise ==
=== Synopsis ===
After a heist to steal the Circulum Infinitus – an artifact fueled by blood magic – goes wrong, the mercenaries tasked with acquiring the artifact deal with the fallout.

=== Setting ===
The series is set in Thedas, a fictional world created for BioWare's video game series Dragon Age. The story will focus on characters within the Tevinter Imperium – a nation in the northern region of Thedas, The Location is "Nessum" a city which once subjugated southern Thedas during ancient times, and is governed by a powerful oligarchy of magic-wielding magisters led by an Imperial Archon. The Imperium is known for its strict caste system, which includes slavery. It is also known for its mages who practice sacrificial and forbidden blood magic.

Chronologically, Absolution takes place after the conclusion of Dragon Age: Inquisition and months after Dragon Age: Inquisition – Trespasser, as characters make reference to events in that game follows BioWare's own canon not by player's own canon, but ten years before the events of Dragon Age: The Veilguard.

== Cast and characters ==
Main

- Kimberly Brooks as Miriam, an elven mercenary and escaped Tevinter slave.
- Matthew Mercer as Fairbanks, a freedom fighter. The character first appeared in a minor role in Dragon Age: Inquisition.
- Ashly Burch as Qwydion, a light-hearted Qunari mage.
- Sumalee Montano as Hira, a human mage and former member of the Inquisition.
- Phil LaMarr as Roland, a warrior and ally of Miriam.
- Keston John as Lacklon, a dwarven fighter and Lord of Fortune.
- Josh Keaton as Rezaren Ammosine, a Tevinter magister who is seeking a mysterious artifact.
- Zehra Fazal as Tassia, Rezaren's lover and a Knight-Commander of the Templar Order.

Guest

- Miranda Raison as Cassandra Pentaghast, a member of the Seekers of Truth and a former companion of the Inquisitor. Raison reprises her role from Dragon Age II and Dragon Age: Inquisition.
- Jean Gilpin as Meredith Stannard, the former Knight-Commander of Kirkwall who was encased in red lyrium after she is defeated by Hawke. Gilpin reprises her role from Dragon Age II.

The Inquistions characters like Cullen Rutherford, Josephine Montilyet and Leliana appeared as a non-speaking cameo appearance in Episode 6.

== Episodes ==
No.	Title	Directed by	Written by	Original release date
1	"A Woman Unseen"	Bae Ki-Yong	Mairghread Scott	December 9, 2022
Mercenaries Miriam and Roland successfully steal lyrium at the cost of their crew, upsetting their handler, Dolph. The meeting is intervened by Sir Fairbanks and Hira, Miriam's old flame. Fairbanks revealed that he commissioned the heist under Hira's suggestion to test Miriam. After the meeting is violently disbanded, Fairbanks introduces Miriam and Roland to his group, healer mage Qwydion and Dwarven warrior Lacklon. They plan to steal the Circulum Infinitus, a magical artifact fueled by forbidden blood magic, from the Summer Palace in Nessum, home of the Tevinter oligarchy and its magister, Rezaren Ammosine. The group intends to use Miriam's familiarity with the location and deliver the artifact to The Inquisition. Despite initial reluctance caused by her traumatic past involving a childhood with her brother and Rezaren, Miriam agrees to assist in the group's infiltration as they prepare for the heist. The group risks attention in a tavern fight to defend Miriam. This reassured her of the mission and she proceeds to lead the group inside the Palace.
2	"The Will of the Maker"	Bae Ki-Yong	Mae Catt	December 9, 2022
Rezaren studies the Circulum stored in the vault by summoning a spirit to inquire about the artifact's origins and resurrection capabilities, despite Knight Commander Tassia's warnings. The spirit mentioned others who seek to use it to bring Tevinter harm but refuses to reveal who. Rezaren's pressures transform the spirit into a demon, which is then vanquished after a brief struggle. Meanwhile, the group continues to infiltrate the Palace. Miriam, tasked with guarding the escape route, encounters an Elven girl trying to hide after stealing from the chef, but decides to give her up despite the girl's pleas. Ridden with guilt, she chases after the girl and ends up eavesdropping on Rezaren and Tassia. As Roland and Lacklon distract the guards, Fairbanks and Hira enter the vault. Hira disables the magical barrier left by Rezaren, but is instead betrayed and attacked by Fairbanks, who eventually escapes with the Circulum with serious injuries. Hira activates the barrier's magical security, which awakens the chained dragon in the vault and floods the Palace with monsters and the undead. Miriam stumbles upon Fairbanks; the latter handing the artifact to the former before succumbing to his injuries, much to Roland and Lacklon's shock.
3	"The Serpent's Coils"	Bae Ki-Yong	Tim Sheridan	December 9, 2022
Lacklon suspects Miriam and refuses her plan to round up the group before reluctantly agreeing. Tasia ordered Rezaren to lock himself in the apartments while her soldiers secure the Palace. Rezaren, eager to join the fight, orders his bodyguard Neb to let him out and join him instead. Roland and Lacklon fight to subdue the undead while Miriam tries to free Hira from the magical barrier to no avail. Elsewhere, Qwydion escapes the monster and saves an elven populace from the undead. Hira, stuck on the dragon's path, forces the group to leave her. They later reunite with Qwydion but finds their escape route surrounded by Rezaren and his soldiers.
4	"Those Who Falsely Dream"	Bae Ki-Yong	Mae Catt	December 9, 2022
A battle ensues between the group and Rezaren's forces. Instructed to handle Miriam, Neb becomes an even match for her. Much to Miriam's horror, Neb is later revealed to be her twin brother, now a submissive, demon-infused corpse. Rezaren expresses his intention on resurrecting Neb before Tassia intervenes. The group manages to escape with Miriam severely injured. Rezaren reveals to Tassia that Miriam was raised as his sibling and suggests using blood magic as an alternative to finding the group, although Tassia rejected the idea. Meanwhile, the group dodges the city's heavy patrol and returns to their safehouse to treat Miriam. Rezaren subdues the dragon and uses blood magic to contact Miriam through her dream, again explaining his plan to resurrect Neb. Miriam argues that she has conflicting memories with Rezaren regarding their childhood, stating that she and Neb were merely slaves raised alongside Rezaren to eventually serve him. She recalls The Harrowing incident where she killed Rezaren's mother after she sacrificed Neb as a conduit, which resulted in Miriam forcefully killing the possessed Neb and escaping slavery. Rezaren proposes to use his magic and Miriam's blood to resurrect Neb and reunite as a family, a prospect she rejects. Peeved, Rezaren reveals his enslaving nature, offering to free the still-alive Hira in exchange for the Circulum before healing her. After recovering, Miriam determines to save Hira.
5	"An Altar of Fire"	Bae Ki-Yong	Tim Sheridan	December 9, 2022
Miriam confides her dark past to the group and they join her plan to save Hira. Tassia interrogates Hira, finding out that she was a Tevinter aristocrat until the Venatori supremacists executed her father for helping enslaved people. She becomes spiteful towards Tevinter, working alongside The Inquisition to bring harm to the nation. Rezaren intercepts the interrogation and admits to using Hira's mutual love with Miriam to lure her back to the Palace. The group arrives at the Palace and slaughters most of Tassia's soldiers. Miriam battles Neb and eventually decapitates him. Tassia fights both Roland and Lacklon while Qwydion sneaks into the throne room and awakens the dragon, wreaking havoc and forcing citizens to evacuate. Miriam readies herself to face the dragon.
6	"The Price of Salvation"	Bae Ki-Yong	Mairghread Scott	December 9, 2022
Amidst the chaos, Hira frees herself and escapes to the safe house, ignoring the group. A grieving Rezaren infused another demon into Neb and controls the dragon using blood magic. Tassia retreats in disgust after realizing Rezaren's deeds. At the safe house, the group confronts Hira on her way to steal the hidden Circulum. Miriam deduces that Fairbanks realizes Hira is the actual traitor, thus his attacks and death on her hands, confirming Lacklon's suspicion. Hira reveals that due to The Inquisition's doubt to attack Tervinter, she instead volunteered herself to the Crimson Knight who plan to use the Circulum to wage war against the nation. To achieve this, she made a deal with Rezaren: offering him to use the Circulum and Miriam for his ritual in exchange for the artifact's ownership and the safety of the group afterward. Rezaren and Neb arrive with the dragon and attack the group whilst demanding the Circulum. Despite Miriam surrendering the artifact, Rezaren breaks his promise to spare the group. He conducts the ritual alongside Miriam, Neb, and the dragon, using their blood to summon Neb's spirit. Against Rezaren's wishes, Neb's spirit destroys his own body. The group's subsequent attacks disrupt the ritual, providing a chance for Miriam to strike Rezaren dead; his body is later found by a tearful Tassia. The group frees the dragon and witnesses Hira escaping with the Circulum. Reassured, they plan on destroying the artifact. In her domain, Meredith the Crimson Knight receives intel from Hira and sends her army to slaughter the "enemy agents" pursuing Hira.

== Development ==
=== Production ===
Dragon Age: Absolution, an animated series set within BioWare's Dragon Age fictional universe, was announced at Netflix's June 2022 Geeked Week event. It was also announced that the show would be produced by Canadian company BioWare and Korean animation studio Red Dog Culture House and helmed by showrunner Mairghread Scott.

== Release ==
The series was released on Netflix on December 9, 2022. A teaser trailer debuted during Netflix's "Geeked Week" event in June. A full trailer was released in November.

== Reception ==
=== Pre-release ===
Ash Parrish, for The Verge after the release of the trailer in November 2022, was optimistic about the quality animation and voice acting but was also curious about how the series might relate to the upcoming Dragon Age: Dreadwolf. Parrish highlighted that BioWare has done several series based on their various video game franchises, such as Dragon Age: Dawn of the Seeker and Dragon Age: Redemption, which feature characters who later appear in the corresponding video game series. She speculated that a character from the series could appear in some form in the forthcoming game as either a companion or an NPC, highlighting Miriam as a possibility for her narrative as a former elven slave.

Sisi Jiang, for Kotaku, commented that based on Cassandra Pentaghast's appearance in the trailer, they assume that Dragon Age: Absolution occurs after the video game Dragon Age: Inquisition. Jiang noted BioWare's prior incorporation of spin-off elements into Inquisition side quests, and thought the same could happen for Dragon Age: Dreadwolf.

=== Critical response ===
On the review aggregator website Rotten Tomatoes, 92% of 12 critics' reviews are positive, with an average rating of 8.40/10.

Petrana Radulovic, for Polygon, commented that focus on characters is part of what makes the Dragon Age video game series "compelling"; likewise, the characters of this animated show jump "off the screen with stellar animation and superb voice acting" and that "while the characters are individually delightful, it's their relationships with one another that seal the deal". Radulovic called the show an "accessible [...] way into the franchise, teasing what makes it special without changing too much". However, she also commented on the short run of episodes and the "limited framework" the show has to work in to not make "assumptions" on player choices in previous games.

Alana Joli Abbott, for Paste, rated Absolution a 9.5/10 and stated that fans of the Dragon Age video game series will enjoy the "trip back to Thedas" while waiting for Dreadwolf; Abbott felt that newcomers who are "fans of adult narrative cartoons and fantasy" would also find "plenty" to enjoy in this show. Abbott highlighted the narratives featuring "LGBTQ romances and characters" as a particular draw to the show – she wrote that "the chemistry between Roland and Lacklon [...] is particularly well developed". Abbott also highlighted Qwydion who acts as "comic relief without ever undermining her character" and called Miriam "a compelling lead". She commented that Absolution has "vibes that mix" shows such as Avatar: The Last Airbender (2005), Carmen Sandiego (2019), and The Legend of Vox Machina (2022) and that the show "uses what's best in both fantasy and heist stories to create a compelling and character driven narrative".

Rafael Motamayor, for /Film, called the show "a hoot" and "a true gift to fans of the games" even though it wasn't as accessible for newcomers – he wrote that "it recreates the experience of playing an RPG, from the many kinds of romances, to the action almost feeling like it's turn-based, with a main party composed of your archetypical RPG classes". He commented that the heist story has an Ocean's Eleven (2001) feel and that the comedy seems similar in tone to Critical Role. Motamayor highlighted the kinetic animation by Red Dog Culture House with "dynamic fight choreography and camera work that feels distinct" from other animated shows such as Castlevania (2017) and The Legend of Vox Machina (2022).

Alyssa Mora, for IGN, stated that the show is a "memorable installment in the fantasy franchise" with an "excellent" cast and "compelling story beats"; she rated it a 7/10. However, Mora felt Absolution was "inaccessible to those unfamiliar with the series" unlike other animated adaptations such as Arcane (2021) and The Legend of Vox Machina (2022). Mora also commented on the limited time the show has which leaves "little room to breathe" as the characters go through their mission and that the relationship development between characters feels "fast-forwarded" – she wrote that "it only speaks to the strength of the writing that we're left wanting to see so much more".

Lauren Morton, for PC Gamer, also felt the show was inaccessible and in a rush as "Absolution just doesn't have enough time for its entire ensemble cast. It barely has enough time to string along its central plot, let alone three romantic relationships and a handful of flashbacks in less time than Robert Pattinson spent on screen as Batman this year". Morton commented that the Dragon Age video game series hinges on its characters and with fewer characters, any character in Absolution could have been "a new fan favorite". She did not feel the show was memorable which was "a real shame" especially as "Dragon Age spinoffs have historically been great".
