= Plus One (TV series) =

- Created by: Tim Allsop; Stewart Williams
- Directed by: Sarah O'Gorman
- Starring: Daniel Mays; Miranda Raison; Nigel Harman; Steve John Shepherd; Ingrid Oliver; Ruth Bradley; Duncan James
- Composer: Mark Thomas
- Country of origin: United Kingdom
- No. of series: 1
- No. of episodes: 5

Production
- Cinematography: Ian Liggett
- Editor: Nick Ames
- Running time: 30 minutes
- Production company: Kudos

Original release
- Network: Channel 4
- Release: 9 January – 6 February 2009

Plus One is a British sitcom written and created by Tim Allsop and Stewart Williams, originally broadcast in 2007 as part of Channel 4's Comedy Showcase, before a full five episode series was commissioned and began transmitting on 9 January 2009. The programme was produced by production company Kudos and directed by Sarah O'Gorman. It centres itself around a "record producer" (of music compilation albums) Rob Black (Daniel Mays), whose girlfriend (Miranda Raison) has dumped him to marry "Duncan from Blue". Rob's life is turned upside-down when he is invited to the wedding and feels that he must have a 'plus one' who will "blow everyone away."

== Cast ==
- Daniel Mays as Rob Black
- Miranda Raison as Linsey
- Ingrid Oliver as Rebecca Black
- Nigel Harman as Rich Black
- Steve John Shepherd as Paul
- Ruth Bradley as Laura
- Duncan James as Duncan
- Georgia King as Astrid
- Susie Amy as Nicola
- Sophie Winkleman as Abby
- Camilla Beeput as Amy

Guest appearances

- Jamelia - herself
- Lisa Snowdon - herself
- Steve Jones - himself

== Episodes ==
No.	Title
1	"I Do a Lot of Work for Charity"
Rob is invited to the wedding of his ex-girlfriend, Linsey, to Duncan James, from Blue. In his attempt to get one up on his new nemesis, Rob decides to find Duncan's first love, Jo, and ask her to the wedding as his ‘plus one’. However, he finds her in a coma, under the care of her mother who is hoping to raise money for her treatment by holding a fun run. In an attempt to impress Nicola Dare (Susie Amy) - his own first love - after having insulted her transgender brother, Rob decides to participate in the fun run himself. Doubting his ability to run 20 km, he plans to cut through the middle of the devised route. He turns up at the event with a cheque donating the greatest amount - most of which was put in from himself instead of sponsors - which earns him great popularity. However, while cutting through the middle of the route, he trips, hits his head on a log and is knocked unconscious. He wakes up with his shoes having been stolen by a tramp, and ends up getting kicked in the crotch by someone who assumes he is also homeless. A five-year-old girl catches him holding his groin in pain, and he proceeds to run to the end of the fun run, where the rest of the participants are awaiting his arrival to celebrate his generous donation. As he arrives, Duncan appears and provides a donation of £17,000, making him the largest donor instead of Rob. Already frustrated, the parents of the eight-year-old girl appear and accuse him of masturbating in front of a young girl, and he is chased further.
2	"Black White and Red All Over"
T4 is featuring the buildup to Duncan and Linsey's wedding in reality show One Love. Rob feels he needs to find an impressive girl to have on his arm if he's to show his ex just what she has missed out on. Enter Rich - Rob's brother - and his girlfriend's sister, Abby (Sophie Winkleman); a gorgeous West End star who always has to have what she wants. In an attempt to secure her as his plus one, Rob agrees to go to a 'bad taste' fancy dress party with Abby, dressed as a panda. Before the party, she paints his face to resemble a panda, but ends up getting the colours the wrong way round. A car crash on the way leads to a nasty case of whiplash and Rob offending two paramedics with his facepaint. The paramedics call Linsey, who arrives at the hospital along with T4's Steve Jones, a million TV viewers and Duncan from Blue. Continuing to offend people with his accidentally racist facepaint, the episode ends with Duncan telling young children in the hospital how it's wrong to be racist and wondering why we all can't just get along.
3	"See it in a Boys Lies"
Rich persuades Rob that he needs a model to accompany him to the wedding. Working in the music compilation industry by placing songs in a spreadsheet, he has access to beautiful models only through the means of his colleague Laura, who works in graphic design. He convinces her to set up a photoshoot with model Aimee, who becomes more and more attracted to him when Laura tells her all the celebrities he has allegedly worked with, including mentioning that Rob and Jamelia are 'practically best friends'. After the shoot, Rob fantasizes about kissing Laura on their desk and begins to see her in a different way. Aimee invites Rob and Laura to a club night, and notice Jamelia is at the same club. Aimee begs Rob to introduce them, leading to him pleading with Jamelia to go along with the story that they're friends. She goes along with it, grudgingly, and tells Aimee that he is a very talented breakdancer. Having to go along with this story to impress Aimee, he performs a dance routine and manages to impress Jamelia, Aimee and Laura. However, this is short-lived when he kicks Laura in the face and is thrown out of the club. He drives alongside her, trying to apologise, and is arrested for mistakenly trying to solicit sex with Laura whom they think is a prostitute.
4	"The Competition Winner"
Rob decides the only way he can upstage Linsey and Duncan in their celebrity wedding magazine pictures is by taking a celebrity as his plus one. Spotting George Clooney's ex Lisa Snowdon across a crowded bar gives him an idea - however he needs a 'competition winner' to even have a chance at meeting her. His brother, Rich, offers his assistance with one of his pupils, Craig, who pretends to be disabled - for a price of money and video games - to get Rob in with Lisa. An allergic reaction to peanuts on Craig's part leads to Lisa having to leave the date early but scheduling a lunch appointment with Rob the next day. Rob tells her about Linsey and Duncan's wedding, and Lisa insists he takes her as his plus one in order to upstage the bride and groom. However, his happiness son comes crashing down, as Craig's mother finds him and accuses him of grooming her son with money and video games in front of a crowd of paparazzi.
5	"One Love"
After a catalogue of dating disasters, close shaves with the law and public disgrace in front of celebrities and models, Rob decides to give up looking for the perfect plus one to outshine Linsey and Duncan. However, before long he meets the beautiful Astrid (a millionaire, supermodel, biochemist whose dad invented Toilet Duck), and they quickly fall for each other. On spending the night together and joining Linsey and Duncan for a double date, he decides Astrid is the perfect plus one. However, on arriving at the wedding in her Aston Martin, Astrid appears to be slightly uncomfortable. The priest asks for any objections, and Astrid pulls out a knife, stabbing Duncan in his testicle. It is revealed that she is his number one stalker, believing that she should be his bride. The wedding is ruined, and Linsey and Duncan plan to do it all again in the future. Laura hints at Rob to take her to the next wedding instead of hunting down models and celebrities, but Duncan bursts into the office in tears, claiming that Linsey ran off with Steve Jones, who was covering their wedding for T4.
