= Second extinction =

Second extinction may refer to:

- Second Extinction, a video game
- Late Devonian extinction, second of the five most severe extinction events in the history of the Earth's biota
