= Rage (video game) =

2011 video game

- Developer: id Software (Note: The multiplayer component was developed by Escalation Studios. The OS X version was ported by Aspyr.)
- Publisher: Bethesda Softworks
- Director: Tim Willits
- Producers: Hunter Hyneman; Jason Kim; Matthew Nelson
- Programmers: Robert Duffy; Jan Paul van Waveren
- Writer: Matthew J. Costello
- Composer: Rod Abernethy
- Engine: id Tech 5
- Platforms: PlayStation 3; Windows; Xbox 360; OS X
- Release: PS3, Windows, Xbox 360: NA: October 4, 2011; AU: October 6, 2011; EU: October 7, 2011; OS X: WW: February 2, 2012
- Genres: First-person shooter, vehicular combat
- Modes: Single-player, multiplayer

Rage is a first-person shooter video game developed by id Software and published by Bethesda Softworks, released in October 2011 for Microsoft Windows, the PlayStation 3, and the Xbox 360, and in February 2012 for OS X. It was first shown as a tech demo at the 2007 Apple Worldwide Developers Conference and was announced at the QuakeCon. Rage uses id Software's id Tech 5 game engine and is the final game released by the company under the supervision of founder John Carmack.

Rage is set in a post-apocalyptic near future, following the impact of the asteroid 99942 Apophis on Earth. Players take control of Nicholas Raine, a soldier put into hibernation in an underground shelter who emerges into the wasteland a century later, and finds himself a wanted man by an oppressive organization known as The Authority. The game has been described as similar to the movie Mad Max 2, and video games such as Duke Nukem, Fallout and Borderlands.

Rage received mainly positive reviews, with reviewers praising the game's combat mechanics, gameplay and graphics while criticizing the lack of story, characters, and direction. A sequel, Rage 2, was released on May 14, 2019.

== Gameplay ==
A player drives a car and uses its weapons to destroy an enemy.

In first-person view, a player alternately throws a three bladed boomerang (wingstick) to kill his foe.

The game primarily consists of first-person shooter and driving segments, with the player using their vehicle to explore the world and travel between missions.

Combat is undertaken from a first-person perspective; the player is armed with a variety of upgradeable firearms, as well as a crossbow, and boomerang-like weapons called "wingsticks" which can be used for stealthy attacks. There are several types of ammunition available for each weapon, to allow the player to further customize their play style. As an example, the crossbow's primary ammunition is metal bolts, but it also can shoot electrified bolts, explosive bolts, and more. There are two standard varieties of enemies: enemies with firearms which will take cover and exchange fire with the player, and melee enemies that will charge the player and attack with melee weapons.

There are a variety of vehicular events for the player to take part in, including races and checkpoint rallies. Racing events may or may not have opponents, and some of them are armed races while others are not. Players can augment their cars with various items and upgrades they can gain by completing events. Rage features some role-playing elements, including an inventory system, looting system, and different types of ammo. Players have the option to customize their weapons and vehicles, as well as build a wide assortment of items using collected recipes. Vehicles be used for racing and for traveling from one location to the other with occasional attacks from enemy vehicles. There are side missions and several other minor exploratory elements.

=== Multiplayer ===
Rage has two multiplayer modes: Road Rage and Wasteland Legends. In Road Rage, up to four players compete in a free-for-all match that takes place in an arena designed to make use of the vehicles. The goal is to collect rally points that appear around the arena while killing one's opponents and stealing their points. Legends of the Wasteland is a series of two-player co-op missions based on stories that are heard throughout the single-player campaign. A total of nine objectives are in this game type.

== Plot ==
On April 13, 2029, asteroid 99942 Apophis collides with Earth, destroying human civilization and turning the world into a wasteland. Survivors come together to form settlements around oases and other practical or habitable locations, while the wastes are plagued by various bandits clans, and mutants, who attack all normal humans in a voracious horde.

In 2135, former U.S. Marine Lieutenant Nicholas Raine emerges from an underground shelter called an Ark, 106 years after being put into stasis. These underground shelters are the direct result of the Eden Project, a massive international undertaking in which hundreds of Arks, containing cryogenic pods, were sealed under the surface of the Earth to preserve enough of the human population to rebuild civilization after the asteroid collision. The Eden Project was far less successful than hoped, as Raine's Ark, in particular, was heavily damaged, with all of its other residents dead and equipment destroyed, and he wakes up alone with no specific goal in mind.

Raine enters the surface, where he is immediately attacked by bandits but is saved by Dan Hagar (voiced by John Goodman), a local wasteland settler who brings Raine to his settlement. Hagar informs him that a powerful technologically advanced organization known as the Authority, which considers itself the one true government of the wasteland, is hunting for Ark survivors for an unknown purpose. Raine briefly aids Hagar's settlement and others in the local area by completing a few small jobs, and during this time it is revealed that the nanotrites injected into Raine's blood before he was sent into hibernation have granted him superhuman abilities to help him survive the harsh environment, but have made him valuable to the Authority. Hagar believes Raine's continued presence is too dangerous for the settlement and sends him to the nearby town of Wellspring instead.

In Wellspring, Raine helps the town with various problems such as fighting off bandits, mutants, and ferrying supplies. Eventually, he comes into contact with Dr. Kvasir, an elderly scientist who previously worked for the Authority, who tells Raine about the inhumane experiments they were responsible for, such as the creation of the mutants. Kvasir puts him into contact with the Resistance, an armed anti-Authority group, where he is tasked with rescuing their leader, Captain Marshall, who has recently been imprisoned by the Authority. Raine again attracts attention from the Authority, forcing him to flee Wellspring and join the Resistance at their headquarters in Subway Town, where he earns the trust of the town and its tyrannical mayor, Redstone. He also learns what had happened in the past century from Captain Marshall, who is an Ark survivor himself. General Martin Cross, who was in charge of the Eden Project, sabotaged the operation shortly before 99942 Apophis struck the Earth by ensuring that only the Arks with people loyal to him were opened on schedule, with this first wave of Ark survivors eventually forming the Authority. The remaining Arks were supposed to stay underground forever in hibernation, including Raine's Ark, which surfaced only because its systems were damaged and it automatically rose to protect any surviving inhabitants.

With the Authority beginning to forcefully expand its influence on the wasteland settlements, the Resistance is forced to act with the help of Raine who can recover data that shows the location of every Ark on the planet. Captain Marshall plans to use this data to activate all the Arks and form an army that can defeat the Authority, but the only way to do this is to transmit the data from Capital Prime, the main headquarters for the Authority. Alone, Raine fights his way through Capital Prime to transmit the Ark activation code, and the game concludes with all the remaining Arks simultaneously becoming active and surfacing.

== Development ==
Several early screenshots were released at the SIGGRAPH conference.

According to design director Matt Hooper, the game's origins were in the concept of muscle cars within a desert setting, which was expanded upon by the creation of a post-apocalyptic world. A team of around 60 core developers worked on the game, which was intended to be the first release of an ongoing franchise.

Rage was intended to have an Entertainment Software Rating Board rating of Teen but received an M. The Windows and Xbox 360 versions are on three dual-layer DVDs, and the PlayStation 3 version is on one Blu-ray Disc. John Carmack has revealed that an uncompressed software build of Rage is one terabyte in size. The PS3, Windows, and OS X versions use OpenGL. A Linux version was rumored. Timothee Besset had stated that he would try to make Linux builds for Rage as he had done in the past, and was expected to do so some time in 2012, but he resigned. John Carmack has since tweeted that there are "no plans for a native Linux client". However, the Windows version is playable on Linux via Wine compatibility.

id announced its partnership with Electronic Arts for publication of Rage. In March 2009, the company's CEO Todd Hollenshead said "No, it won't be out this year". A trailer and several screenshots were released on August 13, 2009, at QuakeCon where it showcased various locations, racing, and first-person gameplay, and a brief insight into the storyline. During Gamescom in Cologne, Germany, Electronic Arts released four new screenshots for Rage.

In 2009, John Carmack stated id Software was not planning to support dedicated servers for the Windows version, and instead would use a matchmaking system like console games. ZeniMax Media, who had acquired developer id Software in June 2009, announced that it had the publishing rights to Rage and that EA would not be involved in the sales or marketing. The announcement also noted that the development of Rage had not been affected by the new deal. Creative director Tim Willits confirmed that the release would miss 2010 and would launch in 2011. Willits later accepted the award from IGN Media for "Best Game" and "Best First Person Shooter" at E3. Additionally, the game was awarded Best First-Person Shooter, Best New IP, Best Xbox 360, Windows, and PlayStation 3 game and the Game of the Show of E3 2010 by GameTrailers.

"No. It actually benefits us. When Call of Duty sells 20 bazillion copies, that means there are 20 bazillion people that meet our potential market. People who have never played a first-person shooter before may play a Call of Duty and say, 'You know, that was fun. Now what else is out there?'"

— Tim Willits, when asked by EGM if he's worried about Rage competing with today's much more crowded shooter genre.

In his keynote speech at QuakeCon 2010 on August 12, 2010, Carmack announced that id was developing a Rage-related game for Apple's iOS. He later described the mobile Rage as a "little slice of Rage ... [about] Mutant Bash TV, a post-apocalyptic combat game show in the Rage wasteland", and separately hinted that he might try to port Rage Mobile to Android, although he later stated no id games would be coming to Android due to lack of financial viability.

At QuakeCon 2011, Carmack offered many technical insights of the development and differences between the three main platforms of Windows, Xbox 360, and PlayStation 3, noting that it was not easy developing such an optimized engine to be able to smoothly run on consoles and still having the best artistically looking game on consoles. He also affirmed that the PC platform at the time was as much as 10 times faster than the current generation of gaming consoles, but this did not mean 10x the performance because of the extra layers of abstraction found in PC compatible operating systems. On September 16, 2011; Bethesda announced Rage had gone gold.

== Marketing and release ==
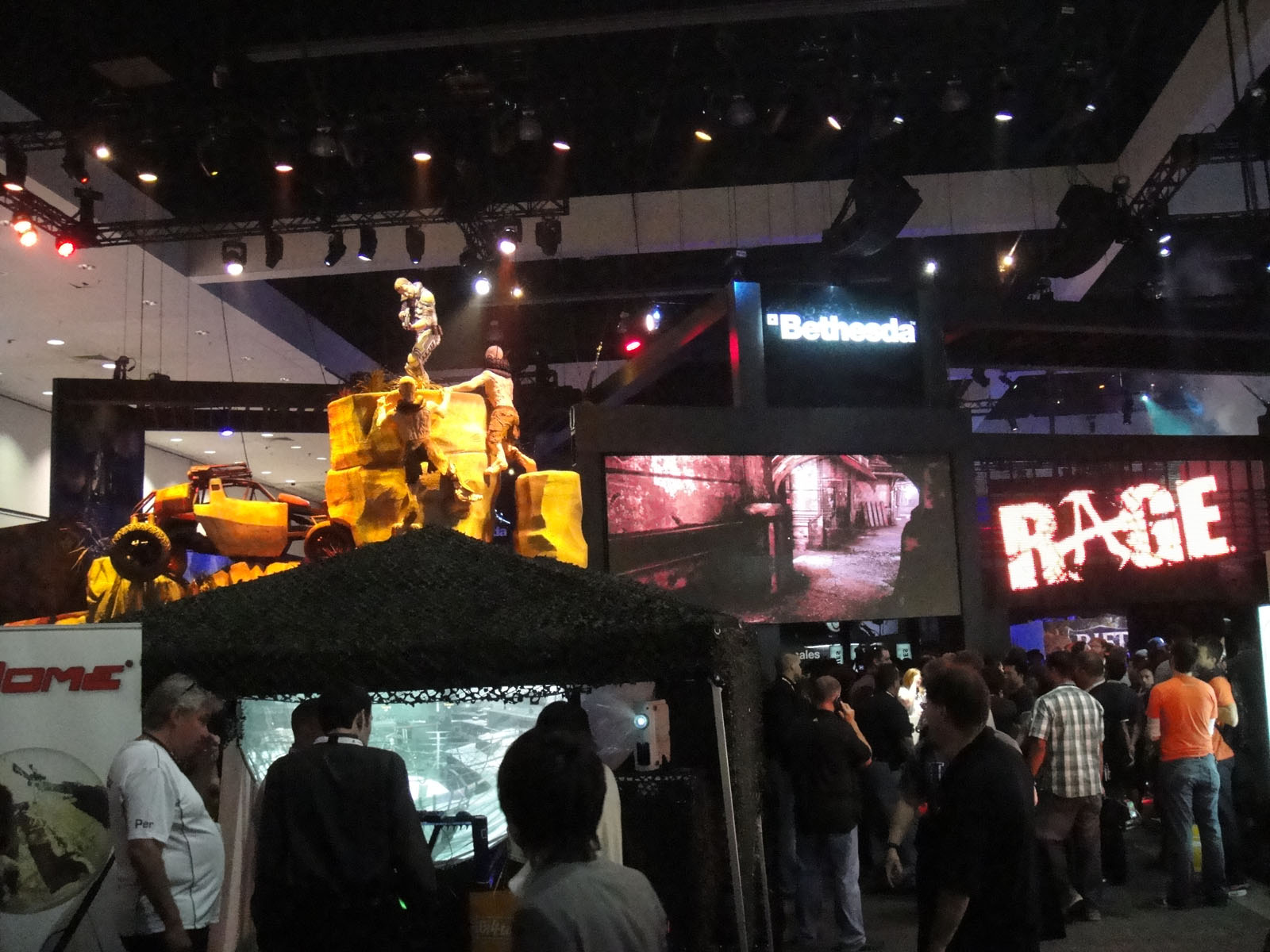
Gameplay demo at E3 2011

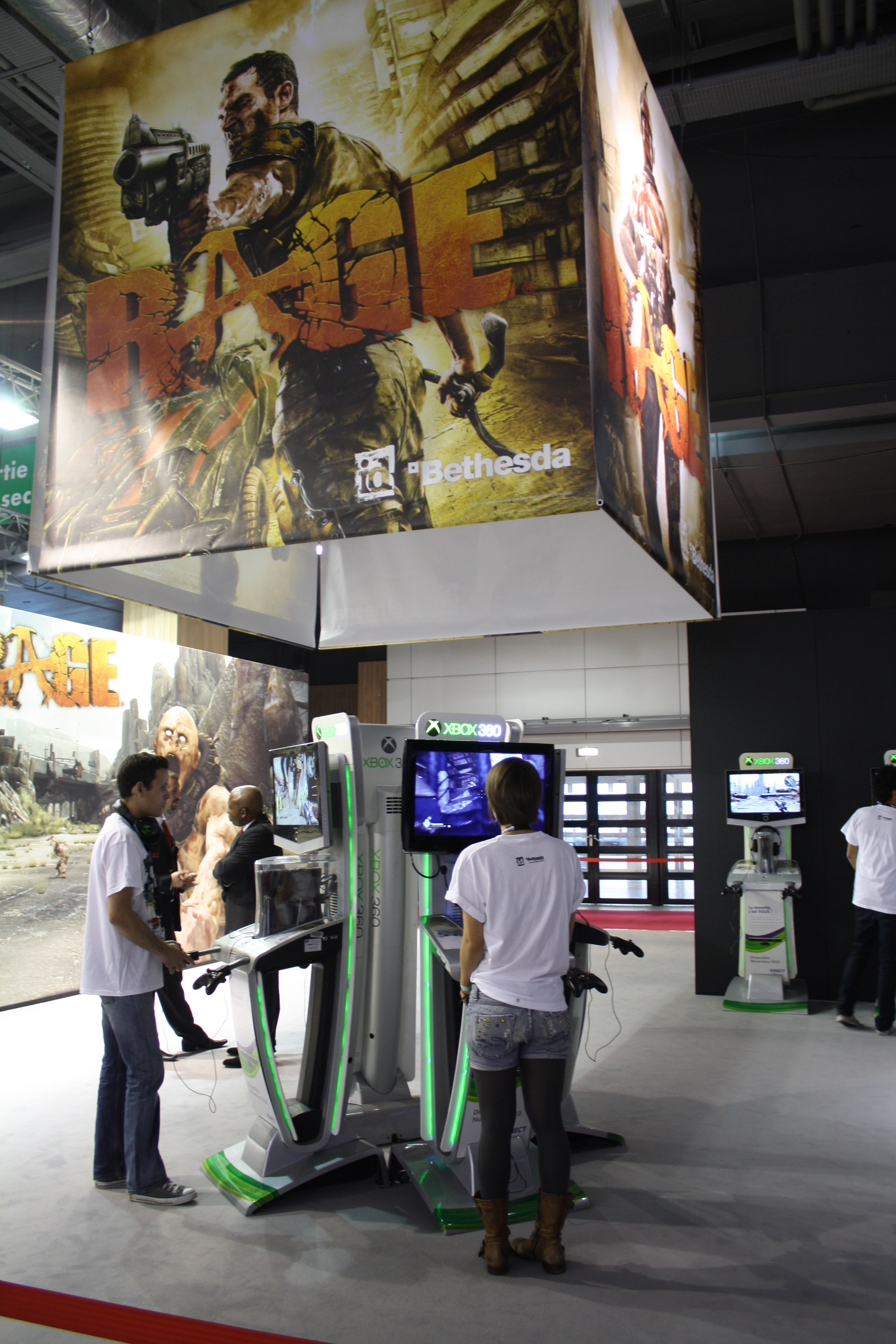
Promotion at Paris Games Week 2011

Bethesda vice president of public relations Pete Hines initially said that a demo of the game is not likely, although one was later released on the Xbox Live Marketplace. Those who pre-ordered the game would receive an automatic upgrade to the Anarchy Edition of the game, which included four exclusive in-game items. Tim Willits claimed modding tools will be available a couple of days after release, although this proved to be untrue.

Rage appeared on fourth season episodes "Problem Dog" and "Hermanos" of Breaking Bad, both broadcast in 2011, as a video game that Jesse Pinkman plays to try to shake off the memory of having killed another character. The case for the disc is also shown in several episodes. The inclusion had come from marketing opportunity discussions between id and AMC as mutual fans. Looking for video game material to include, id suggested Rage. id took mostly pre-existing game areas (the Well area), but worked with the production of the show to include allusions and references to the murder to tie into Jesse's narrative within the game, such as the victim's name written on walls. From there, they provided pre-recorded game footage for AMC to work with. Though the show has Jesse playing Rage via a light gun, this was not part of the end development. In return, id included several Breaking Bad references in Rage on release, such as a version of the acrylic cube containing another character's teeth grill that Hank Schrader receives as a reward for killing him, from the second season episode "Bit by a Dead Bee".

A viral campaign was released that features Los Angeles Clippers power forward Blake Griffin in which he performs stunts to get himself in the game such as dunking over a tiger to impress the developers.

On October 4, 2011, the game was released. On February 2, 2012 Rage was released for OS X through digital distribution, lacking multiplayer content.

=== Editions ===
Rage was available for pre-order in three retail versions: the Anarchy Edition and two region-dependent Collector's Editions. Those who pre-ordered the standard edition of Rage automatically got their copy upgraded to Anarchy Edition. Two Collector's Editions of the game were also available; one through EB Games in Australia, the other through Game and Gamestation in the UK.

- The Anarchy Edition adds a Crimson Elite Armor, a double barrel shotgun, fists of rage (an upgrade for fists that attaches metal blades to the character's hand gloves for use in melee combat) and a buggy called Rat Rod.
- The Australian version of the Collector's Edition (officially called Rage Exclusive EB Games Edition) contains everything from the Anarchy Edition, an exclusive Wingstick prop, six exclusive Rage badges and an exclusive poster of the game.
- The British version of the Collector's Edition (officially called Rage Collector's Pack) also contains all the content of the Anarchy Edition, the three-issue Dark Horse comics based on Rage and a 'Making Of' DVD.

The version released for Mac OS X was called Rage: Campaign Edition. This version contains all content of the Anarchy Edition and the Wasteland Sewer Missions DLC pack. Multiplayer is not present in this version. Only the single-player campaign is available hence the name of the edition.

=== Mods ===
The modding tools for Rage were originally going to be released with the game itself but instead were released on February 8, 2013, on Steam. Titled RAGE Tool Kit or simply id Studio, the tools were used to create the game as well as the DLC.

=== Downloadable content ===
Downloadable content (DLC) was mentioned to be planned for all platforms. The Wasteland Sewer Missions DLC pack, integral part of the Campaign Edition, was released on October 4, 2011, providing access to the sewer systems. A code for the DLC was given away as a pre-order bonus with the Anarchy Edition that allowed early and free access to the DLC. The player character is given a task by people of various cities to rid their city's sewers of the mutant infestation.

Anarchy Edition add-on DLC was released on 15 February 2012 containing all the content of the Anarchy Edition excluding the free Wasteland Sewer Missions Pack DLC code. The package upgrades the standard edition of Rage to the Anarchy Edition.

A new Rage DLC release called The Scorchers was released on December 18, 2012, for Windows, Xbox 360 and PlayStation 3. The plot focused on 'The Scorchers', a bandit clan cut from the final release of the main game and only encountered in vehicle combat missions. The Scorchers were hatching a plan to end all life by destroying the Wasteland and it was up to the main character to save humanity. The DLC added an "Ultra Nightmare" difficulty level and the ability to keep playing the game even after the main questline was completed. The pack features new characters, six new areas, new minigames, new enemies and a new weapon called Nailgun which features three distinct ammunition types. The DLC also fixes some bugs in the game.

== Related media ==
=== Mobile game ===
In November 2010, id Software released Rage: Mutant Bash TV for iOS devices as a demo for showcasing its gameplay. The HD version called Rage HD was released for all iOS devices. John Carmack hinted that he intends to release another iPhone app based on the Rage universe that focuses on the racing aspect of the game.

=== Comics ===
In March 2011, Bethesda and Dark Horse Comics announced a three-issue comic book series based on Rage. The original miniseries was written by Arvid Nelson, and penciled by Andrea Mutti. The cover art was created by Glenn Fabry. The comic series, developed with the direct participation of Rage's creative director, Tim Willits, presents a new twist on the post-apocalyptic near future as one woman discovers that the survival of humankind does not necessarily mean the survival of humanity. The Earth has been devastated by a collision with an asteroid, with a tiny fraction of the population surviving in life-sustaining Arks buried deep below its surface. Those who survive emerge to find a wasteland controlled by a global military dictatorship called the Authority. But a rescued scientist learns that the Authority has lied to her and the other survivors about how this new world came to be.

=== Novel ===
That month, Bethesda announced it would team up with Del Rey Books to create a novel based on Rage. The novel was written by Matthew J. Costello, who wrote the story for the video game. It was released on August 30, 2011.

== Reception ==
Reception

Aggregate score
Aggregator	Score		
Aggregator	PC	PS3	Xbox 360
Metacritic	79/100	81/100	81/100

Review scores
Publication	Score		
Publication	PC	PS3	Xbox 360
Destructoid	N/A	N/A	7/10
Eurogamer	N/A	N/A	8/10
Game Informer	N/A	9/10	9/10
GamePro	N/A	4/5	4/5
GameRevolution	N/A	B	N/A
GameSpot	7/10	8/10	8/10
GameSpy	3.5/5	N/A	N/A
GameTrailers	N/A	9/10	9/10
Giant Bomb	4/5	4/5	4/5
IGN	8.5/10	8.5/10	8.5/10
Joystiq	N/A	N/A	3/5
Official Xbox Magazine (US)	N/A	N/A	7.5/10
PC Gamer (UK)	84%	N/A	N/A
PlayStation: The Official Magazine	N/A	7/10	N/A
VideoGamer.com	8/10	8/10	8/10
The Daily Telegraph	N/A	N/A	3.5/5
Digital Spy	N/A	4/5	N/A

=== Pre-release ===
The game received much recognition before its release. It won the Game Critics Awards of E3 2010 for "Best Console Game", and "Best Action Game", along with the "Special Commendation for Graphics". IGN awarded its "Best Overall Game" and "Best Shooter" in its E3 2010 awards. It also won many of GameTrailers's E3 2010 awards, including "Best New IP", "Best First Person Shooter", "Best PS3 Game", "Best Xbox 360 Game", "Best PC Game", and "Game of the Show".

=== Post-release ===
Rage received generally positive reviews on all platforms according to the aggregate review site Metacritic. The game received praise for its graphics, gameplay and combat mechanics, and criticism mostly aimed towards the game's story and poor out-of-the-box PC compatibility.

EGMNow praised the Xbox 360 version and stated it features impressive visuals, brutal and satisfying combat, fluid animations, advanced enemy AI, many entertaining side-missions, and an addictive multiplayer component. The one complaint was that the final boss fight was unsatisfying compared to the rest of the impressive combat scenarios. GameZone gave the same console version 8.5 out of 10 and called it "a great experience that's coupled with some intensely fun gunplay and some incredibly impressive graphics. It's not quite the Borderlands meets Fallout experience that gamers were expecting. It isn't very long, and it does skimp out on character development, but it focuses more on what id knows best—shooting things in the face. This is one post-apocalyptic wasteland that you'll definitely want to venture into." Ars Technica gave a more negative review of the Xbox 360 version, criticizing lack of story, undeveloped characters, uninteresting quests and a "broken save system" (autosave checkpoints being too far apart, forcing frequent manual saves which are slow on the Xbox 360), while acknowledging the quality of the visuals. Edge gave it seven out of ten and called it "a stunningly rendered FPS, but one that seems caught between a desire to innovate and the desire to be true to the template its creators defined".

Game Informer said that "while most people will rave about Rage's technology, this game's most impressive component is its gunplay ... the mutated hostiles of the wastes ... crawl out of the woodwork, scamper along walls, and create a sense of absolute terror", and "the challenge posed to the player is to put them down quickly or pray that every close range shotgun blast takes a large chunk of flesh." The soundtrack was described as "appropriately moody", and the animation system as one of the most "impressive" ever made. However, the review also argued that "the driving sections are no more than optional diversions" and "the lack of content in the overworld is disappointing". In conclusion, the story and overworld were described as "dated", but the "pulse-pounding gunplay" was hailed as "a nice change of pace" that "stands out in a crowded market". IGN praised the graphics, calling them some of the best, but criticized the game's story and forgettable characters. VideoGamer.com gave the game an 8 out of 10 praising Rage's combat, but criticized the driving controls with ATVs that felt like they were "culled from a different, far cheaper game." In Japan, where the game was ported on October 6, 2011 (the same release date as Australia's), Famitsu gave the PS3 and Xbox 360 versions a score of two nines, one eight, and one nine for a total of 35 out of 40.

411Mania gave the PS3 version a score of eight out of ten and said it was "by no means a bad game. Id has a solid shooter with great graphics and solid controls. However, plenty of other games have done the same things now. Rage is still a good game and will tide shooter fans over until other shooters release later this year. Just don't expect anything groundbreaking here." Digital Spy gave the same console version four stars out of five and called it "a triumphant mix of vintage shooter mechanics and high-octane driving segments. The end result is a title that captures the essence of its genre-defining predecessors while offering fans something new. id's Tech 5 engine ensures that this is the studio's best-look release to date, and the sheer volume of features on offer make it one of the most rewarding." Softpedia gave the Xbox 360 version a score of four stars out of five and called it "a must-have, must-play game." The Digital Fix gave the same console version eight out of ten and called it "a sound purchase". The Guardian gave the same console version a similar score of four stars out of five and called it "a decidedly mixed affair. It isn't perfect, some of it feels quite antiquated, and it is by no means the high-water moment in the FPS genre that Doom and Quake were in their day. But it is still a very eye-catching and incredibly fun shooter, and in its best moments, it can't be matched for pure entertainment value."

However, The Daily Telegraph gave the Xbox 360 version three-and-a-half stars out of five and called it "a game that would have benefitted from being streamlined, with additional FPS levels replacing the awkward driving. It should have been an id game. Instead, it occupies this weird halfway-house between Borderlands, MotorStorm, and Doom, not quite an RPG, not quite a racer and not quite an FPS." The A.V. Club gave the same console version a C+ and said that its "huge swaths ... are lifted wholesale from Fallout 3, Borderlands, and BioShock, making Rage forever veer between loving homage and blatant plagiarism. In the end, Rage is an insecure, overly busy game that tries too hard to be too many things, and winds up with a greasy sheen of flop-sweat on its brow."

=== Accolades ===
Rage was also recognized in several 2011 end-of-year award ceremonies. It was nominated for "Best Graphics" and "Best New Franchise" in Xbox Achievements' Game of the Year 2011 Awards. GameTrailers nominated it for "Best First Person Shooter" and "Best New IP". At the 2011 Spike Video Game Awards, it was nominated for "Best Graphics" and "Best Shooter". During the 15th Annual Interactive Achievement Awards, the Academy of Interactive Arts & Sciences nominated Rage for "Outstanding Achievement in Visual Engineering". Technical issues with the PC version led to articles explaining to users how to "fix" Rage's problems. AMD has released drivers that attempt to fix some of the issues. On October 10, 2011, patches for the Windows version were released which added various graphical options to the game and fixed some driver-related graphical issues.

== Sequel ==
A sequel, Rage 2, which is a joint development between id Software and Avalanche Studios, was released on May 14, 2019, for Microsoft Windows, PlayStation 4, and Xbox One.
