= Comedy Showcase =

British comedy specials

- Genre: Comedy
- Country of origin: United Kingdom
- Original language: English
- No. of series: 3
- No. of episodes: 17

Production
- Running time: 30mins (inc. adverts)

Original release
- Network: Channel 4
- Release: 5 October 2007 – 13 January 2012

Related
- Comedy Lab

Comedy Showcase is a series of one-off comedy specials featuring some of Britain's fledgling comedy talent. Its format is reminiscent of the much earlier television series Playhouse. The format was replaced in 2012 by 4Funnies.

== Series overview ==
Series	Episodes	Originally released	
Series	Episodes	First released	Last released
1	6	5 October 2007	23 November 2007
2	6	6 November 2009	18 December 2009
3	5	2 September 2011	13 January 2012

== Episodes ==
=== Series 1 (2007) ===
No.	Title	Original release date
1	"Other People"	5 October 2007
Martin Freeman stars as Greg Wilson, a washed-up child magician whose career was ended in 1986 after being publicly humiliated on a children's show phone-in. Now in his 30s, Greg is recognised at his sofa-salesman job by a former fan and asked for an autograph, a request that sets a bizarre set of circumstances in motion and sees Greg in a courtroom facing a long sentence.
2	"Ladies and Gentlemen"	12 October 2007
The lives and awkward loves of a group of thirtysomething friends who share a house in London in 1865. Written by Peep Show's Jesse Armstrong and Sam Bain. Starring Reece Shearsmith and Darren Boyd.
3	"Plus One"	19 October 2007
After his girlfriend Linsey (played by Miranda Raison) leaves him to marry Duncan James from Blue, Rob Black (played by Rory Kinnear) decides to take revenge by upstaging the couple on their wedding day. Written by Tim Allsop & Stewart Williams Plus One has been spun off into a full-length five-part series in 2009 for Channel 4.
4	"The Eejits"	26 October 2007
An Irish pub band by the name of E-Z Feelin hope to hit the big-time when a former U2 roadie gives them some of the stars' old equipment. But they run into trouble when U2 want their stuff back - and E-Z Feelin's sideline in smuggling mystery packages into Northern Ireland probably wasn't such a smart move either.
5	"Free Agents"	9 November 2007
Stephen Mangan stars as Alex, a maudlin theatrical agent, who's been thrown out by his wife. He has a disastrous one-night stand with his colleague Helen (Sharon Horgan) that ends in him sobbing with self-pity. The pair spend the rest of the episode engaged in an unseemly, often embarrassing, psychological tussle. Free Agents has been spun off into a full-length six-part series in 2009 for Channel 4.
6	"The Kevin Bishop Show"	23 November 2007
The Star Stories impressionist presents a super-fast-paced sketch show, which features a 42 sketches in 23 minutes. The Kevin Bishop Show has been spun off into a full-length six-part series in 2008 with another six-part series in 2009 for Channel 4.

=== Series 2 (2009) ===
No.	Title	Original release date
1	"Campus"	6 November 2009
A semi-improvised sitcom created by the writers of Green Wing set at the fictitious Kirke University, following the lives of some of the staff. Campus has been spun off into a full-length six-part series in 2011 for Channel 4.
2	"PhoneShop"	13 November 2009
Sitcom set in a mobile phone shop and a new employee working as part of a one-day trial. Featuring Ricky Gervais as script editor. PhoneShop has been spun off into a full-length six-part series in 2010 with another six-part series in 2011 and another six-part series in 2013 for E4.
3	"The Increasingly Poor Decisions of Todd Margaret"	27 November 2009
Sitcom about an American (played by David Cross) who takes a job running the sales team at the London branch of his company, but who has no experience of British culture, knows nothing about sales and has only one employee. The Increasingly Poor Decisions of Todd Margaret has been spun off into a full-length six-part series in 2010 with another six-part series in 2012 for More4 and a third six part series in 2016.
4	"The Amazing Dermot"	4 December 2009
Sitcom pilot starring Rhys Darby as a struggling magician trying to get his career back on track following an incident. Genevieve Barr plays a deaf nurse.
5	"Guantanamo Phil"	11 December 2009
Sitcom about a birdwatcher from Stoke-on-Trent returning home after spending six years as a prisoner in Guantanamo Bay.
6	"Girl Friday"	18 December 2009
A sketch show featuring an all female cast, including Josie Long, Kerry Howard, Sara Pascoe, Nat Luurtsema, Kathryn Drysdale and Lu Corfield.
7	"Pete v Life"	N/A (Transmitted as part of full series)
Sitcom about a struggling sports writer whose life is commented on by two sports commentators. Pete v Life was given a full series before it was transmitted. The pilot was therefore shown with the rest of the series and not part of the showcase. The show ran for two series.

=== Series 3 (2011–2012) ===
No.	Title	Original release date
1	"Chickens"	2 September 2011
Scripted comedy from long-time collaborators Simon Bird, Joe Thomas and Jonny Sweet set during World War I, it follows the antics and everyday lives of three young men, who have not gone to war for three very different reasons. They meanwhile deal with disdain from the women of the village, left behind when the other men went to war. Chickens was made into a full-length six-part series broadcast in 2013 on Sky1.
2	"Coma Girl"	9 September 2011
Three old school chums are flung together once again, due to the tragic circumstances following a mutual friend's road accident.
3	"The Fun Police"	16 September 2011
Rhys Darby headlines an ensemble cast of rising comedy stars, in this sitcom based around the inner workings of a dysfunctional branch of Health and Safety operatives.
4	"The Angelos Epithemiou Show"	30 December 2011
Starring Dan Skinner as Angelos Epithemiou, a modern-day clown living in an oversized world of pure fun. The Angelos Epithemiou Show has been spun off into a full-length six-part series in 2012 for Channel 4.
5	"House Of Rooms"	13 January 2012
Milton and his mother live together in a big old house, renting out their spare rooms to a variety of tenants including Alice, a shy, tongue-tied girl who can't quite communicate with Milton, who's equally awkward in her presence. When new tenant Paul arrives, he seems to hit it off with Alice right away, forcing Milton to up his game and try to compete for her attention.
