= Evolution of the Daleks =

182b – "Evolution of the Daleks"
- Doctor Who episode

Cast
- Doctor: David Tennant – Tenth Doctor
- Companion: Freema Agyeman – Martha Jones
- Others: Miranda Raison – Tallulah; Ryan Carnes – Laszlo; Hugh Quarshie – Solomon; Andrew Garfield – Frank; Eric Loren – Dalek Sec; Earl Perkins – Man #1; Barnaby Edwards, Nicholas Pegg, David Hankinson – Dalek Operators; Nicholas Briggs – Dalek Voices; Paul Kasey – Hero Pig Man (Note: Hero Pig Man, or Hero Pig in part 1, played by Paul Kasey is mentioned in the credits. This is not a reference to a specific character but to the pig who was given the most to do, 'Hero' being the term for a prop or costume with the most detail and therefore most suitable for closeups.); Ian Porter – Hybrid

Production
- Directed by: James Strong
- Written by: Helen Raynor
- Produced by: Phil Collinson
- Executive producers: Russell T Davies; Julie Gardner
- Music by: Murray Gold
- Production code: 3.5
- Series: Series 3
- Running time: 2nd of 2-part story, 45 minutes
- First broadcast: 28 April 2007

Chronology
← Preceded by "Daleks in Manhattan"	Followed by → "The Lazarus Experiment"

"Evolution of the Daleks" is the fifth episode of the third series of the revived British science fiction television series Doctor Who. It was first broadcast on BBC One on 28 April 2007, and is the conclusion of the two-part story begun in "Daleks in Manhattan" on 21 April.

The episode is set in New York City in 1930. In the episode, Dalek Sec (Eric Loren) of the Cult of Skaro attempts to make further alterations to his human test subjects he intends to remake into a new race of Daleks as part of his species' evolution. Sec is betrayed by his fellow Daleks for doing this.

According to Broadcasters' Audience Research Board figures this episode was seen by 6.97 million viewers and was the seventeenth most popular broadcast on British television in that week.

== Plot ==
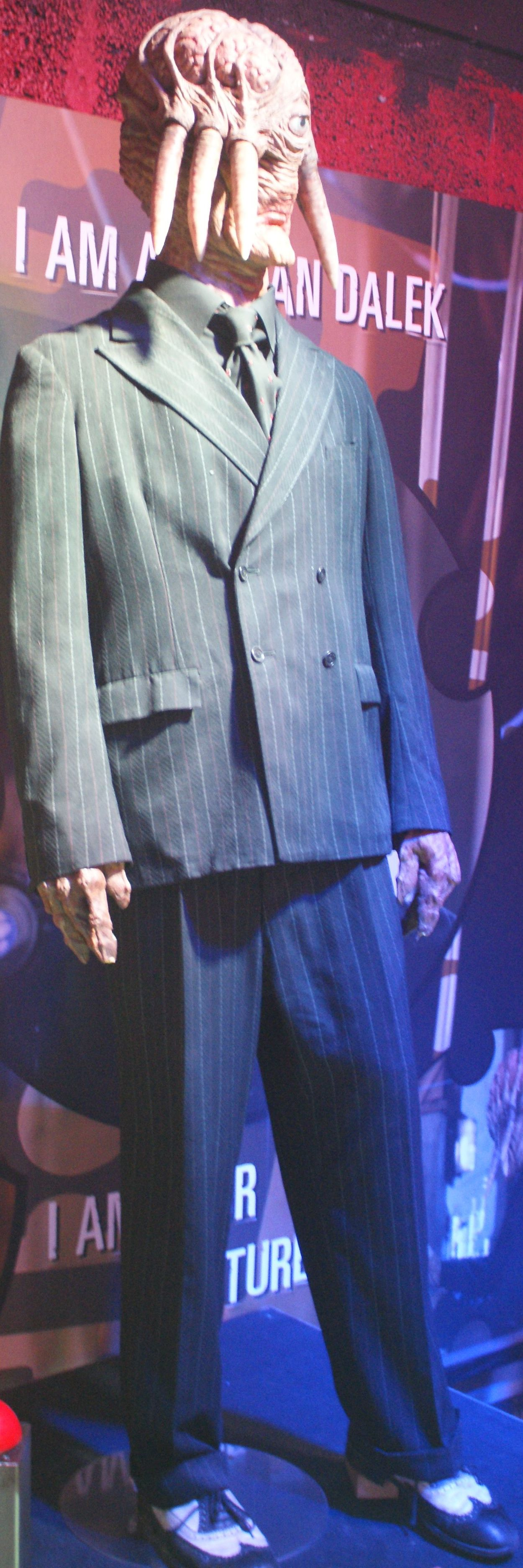
The Human Dalek, as shown at the Doctor Who Experience.

After the creation of the hybrid Dalek-human, the Tenth Doctor confronts the Cult of Skaro and helps Martha and Frank escape. As Dalek Sec begins experiencing emotions Dalek Caan and Dalek Jast discuss their lack of confidence in him. The Doctor and Martha return to Hooverville, which is attacked by the Daleks. Although Solomon is killed, Dalek Sec orders the Doctor to be brought to him alive.

At the Dalek lab at the Empire State Building, the Doctor learns that the Daleks are planning to combine their DNA with humans and create more hybrids. The process requires more energy than can be generated with the technology of 1930, so the Daleks plan to use gamma radiation from a solar flare. The Doctor agrees to help once he realises that the human subjects are already brain dead and cannot be saved otherwise. He also offers to take the new hybrids and the Daleks to a new planet so they can start over, to which Dalek Sec agrees. Daleks Caan, Jast, and Thay stage a mutiny, chaining up Dalek Sec and declaring him a traitor. The Daleks then decide to replace the human DNA completely with their own. The Doctor regroups with Martha, who has broken into the Empire State Building with Tallulah and Frank and analysed the building plans together. Martha tells the Doctor he must remove the Dalekanium panels on the mast of the building to stop the energy collection. The Doctor does not remove the Dalekanium in time and holds the mast as the strike hits. The energy flows down the building, awakening the new hybrids.

The Doctor returns to the theatre with the human-Dalek army following them in the sewers. In the theatre, the Doctor pleads with Daleks Thay and Jast to listen to Dalek Sec and let him help. They refuse, attempting to kill the Doctor but Sec steps in between and sacrifices himself. The Daleks order their army to kill the Doctor, but find that the humans are questioning orders. By exposing himself to the gamma strike, the Doctor caused some of his Time Lord DNA to transfer to the human shells. The army kill Thay and Jast. Dalek Caan activates a termination sequence to kill the rest of the army. Upset by this act of genocide, the Doctor returns to the Dalek lab to face Caan, but Caan escapes via temporal shift.

== Production ==
The theatre sequence was filmed at the Parc & Dare Theatre, Treorchy. Scenes set at the Hooverville shanty town were filmed at Bute Park, Cardiff. Some second unit filming for this story was done in New York City. It primarily consisted of static shots of landmarks and landscape views, many of which were digitally altered to remove architecture created since the story's setting. This constitutes the second time any filming for Doctor Who has been conducted in America. (The 1996 TV movie, although produced in Vancouver, Canada, included establishing shots of San Francisco filmed by a second unit; an earlier story, The Two Doctors, was originally to have been filmed in New Orleans, but the budget of the time would not allow it.)

The presence of the Daleks in this story was reported by the News of the World on 12 November 2006, and confirmed by the BBC in late December.
