= Dragon Age: Dawn of the Seeker =

Japanese name
- Kanji: ドラゴンエイジ ブラッドメイジの聖戦
Transcriptions
- Revised Hepburn: Doragon'eiji: Chi madō-shi no jūjigun
- Directed by: Fumihiko Sori
- Written by: Jeffrey Scott
- Produced by: Justin Cook; Makoto Hirano; Carly Hunter; Tomohiko Iwase; Lindsey Newman; Adam Zehner
- Starring: Colleen Clinkenbeard; J. Michael Tatum
- Edited by: Jeremy Jimenez, Daniel Mancilla
- Music by: Naoyuki Horiko, Reiji Kitazato, Shogo Ohnishi, Masafumi Okubo
- Production companies: BioWare; Electronic Arts; FUNimation Entertainment; Oxybot; T.O Entertainment
- Distributed by: T.O Entertainment
- Release date: 11 February 2012
- Running time: 90 minutes
- Country: Japan
- Languages: Japanese; English

Dragon Age: Dawn of the Seeker (Japanese: ドラゴンエイジ ブラッドメイジの聖戦, Hepburn: Doragon Eiji Buraddo Meiji no Seisen; "Dragon Age: Crusade of the Blood Mage") is a 2012 Japanese fantasy anime film directed by Fumihiko Sori and based on the video game series Dragon Age. The film explores the backstory of Cassandra Pentaghast, a major character in the Dragon Age universe, and how she became known as the Right Hand of the Divine. It was co-produced by BioWare, EA and anime distribution company Funimation Entertainment and released in Japanese theaters on 11 February 2012.

== Plot ==
The film begins just before the Seekers launch an attack against a group of mages who have kidnapped a young girl for an unknown ritual, with Cassandra being warned to watch her fury by Byron, a fellow Seeker and a mentor/paternal figure to her. The Seekers successfully rescue the girl and Cassandra fells the mage's dragon, though the leader of the rogue mages escapes. Later, Cassandra finds Byron taking the girl from the other Seekers, and accompanies him as he warns of a possible conspiracy. The rogue mages ambush them, kill Byron, and re-kidnap the girl, with Byron's last words telling Cassandra "Hate can only breed more hate".

Cassandra discovers another mage in the woods, named Regalyan (nicknamed "Galyan"), who claims to be unaffiliated with the other mages and is instead a contact of Byron, intending to take the girl to safe place. Cassandra is initially suspicious of him for being a mage, but after they escape from the other Seekers and he heals her wounds with magic, she becomes less hostile. Eventually, they discover a templar to be conspiring with the rogue mages' help. They try to tell the High Seeker of the plot, but the templar kills him and frames them from it, capturing them and slating them for execution.

Galyan's fellow loyalist mages rescue them, and reveal that the templar is part of a conspiracy to assassinate the current Divine, which would transfer power to the current Right Hand, also in on the plot. Cassandra confronts the templar, but spares him to be taken into custody, citing Byron's last words. However, she ends up reneging on her promise to Byron when she immediately decapitates him after he suddenly gets up and desperately tries to attack her by surprise. The rogue mages then complete their ritual and send dragons to attack the Divine and other high-ranking Chantry members in the middle of a festival, and a massive fight breaks out, with Cassandra saving the Divine and taking out the dragon killing her. At the end, Cassandra is named the "Hero of Orlais", and the Divine's new Right Hand.

== Cast ==
Character	Japanese voice actor	English voice actor
Cassandra Pentaghast	Chiaki Kuriyama	Colleen Clinkenbeard
Regalyan D'Marcall	Shōsuke Tanihara	J. Michael Tatum
Frenic	Hiroshi Iwasaki	Chuck Huber
Grand Cleric	Kaya Matsutani	Brina Palencia
Byron	Tetsuo Komura	John Swasey
High Seeker	Takaya Hashi	R. Bruce Elliott
Knight Commander	Gackt	Christopher Sabat
Divine	Gara Takashima	Pam Dougherty
Lazarro	Hiroomi Sugino	Mike McFarland
First Enchanter	Kazuaki Itō	Kenny Green
Alte	Hajime Iijima	Joel McDonald
Haydi	Go Shinomiya	Ian Sinclair
Anthony Pentaghast	Eiji Miyashita	John Burgmeier
Avexis	Tomoko Nakamura	Monica Rial
Revered Mother	Junko Kitanishi	Luci Christian

== Development ==
In contrast to the games, the CGI-animated Cassandra in Dawn is younger, with longer hair, and wears largely light armor.

Unlike the Dragon Age video games, the animation studio developing Dawn of the Seeker could build specific sets for the film's scenes and focus on picture making. The choice to center the film on Cassandra as it tied into the themes the series had been building, giving "a new take" on the events and groups of the franchise. Mike McFarland, voice director of the film, felt the character had been well received in the second game, so seeing her again would be good for fans. The choice to use a female protagonist was to then-Dragon Age creative director Mike Laidlaw a "non-issue", calling the Dragon Age setting largely gender-blind and placing her gender secondary to being a "badass".

The character's design and personality differs from the video games, and is grounded on her family's legacy as a dragon hunting clan. Dawn takes place after Cassandra has become a Seeker, but before she has become Right Hand of the Divine. Being younger, Funimation lengthened the character's hair and lightened her make-up in order to give her a "more innocent" appearance. A ponytail was chosen for its practicality, as it wouldn't obstruct vision during a fight. In addition to her heavy armor, the need for stealth led to the creation of light armor for the character. Early sketches explored the possible designs for these armors. Laidlaw called the Cassandra of Dawn of the Seeker "a little more emotionally tempestuous", someone more "vulnerable" physically and emotionally than in Dragon Age II.

Cassandra's voice actress in the games, Miranda Raison, was not involved with Dawn of the Seeker. The character is voiced by Chiaki Kuriyama in the original Japanese dialogue and Colleen Clinkenbeard in the English dub.

== Reception ==
Dawn of the Seeker received mixed reviews. Zac Bertschy, of Anime News Network, called its characters uninteresting, saying there was no given reason to care about Cassandra other than her being "so brash, serious and in need of an ass to kick". Japanator.com's Pedro Cortes similarly criticized her character, saying Cassandra was only differentiated from other characters by her "hate of anything magic" from her "tragic past", though called her design "visually appealing". Both criticised the animation in the film. In a positive review of the film, Holly Ellingwood for activeAnime compared Cassandra's appearance to that Bo from Lost Girl and praised "the expression in her eyes", saying the character "looked fierce and every bit the dangerous and elite knight she is supposed to be".
