= Cassandra Pentaghast =

Fictional character in Dragon Age

- Dragon Age character
- Cassandra as she appears in Dragon Age: Inquisition (2014)
- First game: Dragon Age II (2011)
- Voiced by: Miranda Raison; Colleen Clinkenbeard (Dawn of the Seeker)

In-universe information
- Home: Nevarra
- Class: Warrior
- Specialization: Templar

Cassandra Pentaghast is a fictional character in BioWare's Dragon Age franchise. She is the "Right Hand" of the Divine, the leader of the dominant religion in the Dragon Age setting, and a Seeker of Truth, an order of said religious organization. The character made her debut in 2011's Dragon Age II, where she appeared as part of the game's framing device. An anime film prequel, Dragon Age: Dawn of the Seeker, was released in 2012, covering the character's backstory. She appeared again in 2014's Dragon Age: Inquisition, where she serves as a party member. Cassandra makes a cameo appearance in the first episode of the 2022 Netflix animated series Absolution.

A forceful character was needed to "carry" Dragon Age II's story. The character was designed to be "severe and dramatic", and has a heavily angular face representing her "hard edge". The developers wanted the Seeker armor to be easily recognisable, and it has a "strong and graphic" silhouette. Longer hair proved difficult to animate in the game, leading to her current short hair. It was intended that Cassandra visually display her authority and power. Miranda Raison provides Cassandra's voice in the games and in Absolution, though she does not voice the character in Dawn of the Seeker.

Cassandra received a positive reception in Inquisition, with attention being drawn to her layered personality, as well as her place as one of Inquisition's diverse cast of women. For her earlier appearance in Dawn of the Seeker, she received a more mixed response, with some credit going to her design but her characterization being criticised.

== Character overview ==
The character is presented as a member of the Seekers of Truth, a "quiet" order dedicated to protecting and policing the Chantry, described as "the best of the best" with unique training and access to powerful magic. The order are "granted ultimate authority in its investigations", and answer directly to the Divine. Robert Purchese of Eurogamer roughly equated the Chantry and the Divine to the Christian Church and the Pope, respectively. Originally a noble, the Pentaghasts being the ruling family of Neverra as well as famed dragon hunters, Cassandra joined the Seekers after her brother died. In addition to being a Seeker, she is the Right Hand of the Divine, serving as the physical side in extending the Divine's reach.

Cassandra is "strong, militant, with a very hard line" concerning the Chantry, someone who "won't take no for an answer". Creative director Mike Laidlaw described Cassandra as being "brash, impulsive" and having "anger management issues", but also being "incredibly dedicated" and in the third Dragon Age game doing "whatever it takes to set the world right". Cassandra's writer in Inquisition, David Gaider, attributed to her "a sense of propriety and duty", though felt she did what she felt was "right and just" over following "law or duty". He described her as "very practical in battle", and primarily focused on protecting the helpless or innocent over style or "showing off". Gaider also drew a distinction between how the character views herself and how others see her, with her appearing "very stern and rigid, perhaps even humorless" despite the occasional "surprise" of a "wry comment" or some small sarcasm.

== Concept and creation ==
BioWare needed a strong character in order to "carry" the story of Dragon Age II, where she acts as an interrogator. This meant she had to be "powerful", "forceful", and "a little bit angry". Dragon Age II itself was a sequel to 2009 game Dragon Age: Origins. For the games, British actress Miranda Raison was chosen to voice Cassandra. Raison uses a made-up accent to voice the character, reflective of her Nevarran origins.

Cassandra was originally written by Jennifer Hepler, though then-lead writer David Gaider took up the character after Hepler left the company during the development of Inquisition. Her hidden romanticism proved an aspect which Gaider felt made her "quite fun" to write, and he commented he had yet to make a character quite like her. BioWare built upon the characters before deciding who the romance options would be, and felt it important to try to make each romantic arc unique and not a retread of past plots. Mike Laidlaw said, "In a lot of ways, I think she represents the opportunity to grow by understanding [and not] getting increasingly lost in the noise of Dragon Age's rising chaos."

BioWare wanted returning characters to make sense, and had to ask questions like "How did they grow? How did they change in the intervening years?" Laidlaw noted how, after the events of Dragon Age II Cassandra's opinions could change, while Gaider commented that "what we find in Inquisition is a Cassandra who's realizing the world doesn't work like she believed it does", saying that she is walking a path of doubt.

Her voice actor in the games, Miranda Raison, called the character a "toughie", yet noted her vulnerable side. Raison described her as "not just masculine, she's just a girl who's not a girly girl". Both Raison and Gaider noted her hidden sense of romanticism, with Gaider saying that she hides the things she holds passion for due to placing them "on display" feeling very unseemly. In contrast to II, Raison commented that the Cassandra in Inquisition has a more human, if "not exactly softer", side to her, and called her "angrier" in the second game.

=== Visual design ===
"Her face became all about her aggression. Through the angle of her facial structure to the angle of her ears. It all became about giving her a strong aggressive forward visual flow." —Casper Konefal

The character was intended to be "severe and dramatic", with associate art director Matt Rhodes likening her appearance to being "queen of the vampires". The in-universe country Cassandra came from influenced her appearance, Nevarra being closer to the equator and Nevarrans generally having darker-tone skin and black hair as a result. Art director Matthew Goldman attributed her with an "austere" beauty, reflective of her intelligence and devotion to good. Creative director Mike Laidlaw commented that the team "wanted to make sure she was hot. To dial her to eleven, to make her absolutely gorgeous, really enticing—yet at the same time, she's powerful, she's strong, she's wearing platemail."

In the series, Cassandra has "hair as short as her temper". The character was originally designed with long hair. However, the long-hair proved difficult to manage, especially in Dragon Age II where the character was in dark lighting for almost the entirety of the game. The shorter hair tried to remain "severe" while working better in the game engine and not causing bugs with her armor. Improving the lighting on characters was one of the "main goals" of the second game.

Cassandra's face has various elements to keep her unique, such as "narrow eyebrows, heart-shaped face, strong jaw, darker lips, and walnut hazel eyes". The choice of walnut hazel eye colour served to further her authoritative look, appearing a bit warmer than blue eyes and giving her a harder edge. Similarly, her portraiture is heavily angular, to reflect her "hard" demeanor. For her appearance in Inquisition, concept artist Casper Konefal decided to ignore the subjective criteria of "beauty", and try to focus her design on presenting her "power and authority", trying to give her "a strong aggressive forward visual flow".

The character is depicted in heavy armor, fitting in with her "tough" character. Cassandra's "uniformed, practical attire" also acts to show her lack of love for "comfort or convenience". BioWare wanted the Seeker armor to be "instantly recognisable" or "iconic". The Seeker symbol, emblazoned on the armor, is an altered version of the Chantry symbol (a sun) with an eye in the middle, representative of the Chantry "seeking the truth". Her armor lets her cast a "strong and graphic" silhouette, again illustrating her "hard" demeanor.

The change to the Frostbite engine for Inquisition allowed for increased visual fidelity compared to previous games, and enhanced model details with more sophisticated shaders and a "realistic surface response". Unlike the second game, in Inquisition party members may equip any armor barring class and other restrictions; however, each armor looks different on characters, with each having their own "themes". Cassandra and the other followers are divided into two bases and two bitpacks that can be interchanged, with each part of the bitpacks having three separate "progressions", and colors and material may be varied. BioWare wished to retain the feel of a character while still giving a sense of advancement.

In the lead-up to Inquisition's release, BioWare released character kits of Cassandra and Varric in order to assist cosplayers.

== Appearances ==
=== Dragon Age II ===
Cassandra first appeared in Dragon Age II, in 2011, as part of the game's frame narrative. The game opens with her interrogation of Varric Tethras, a party member in the game, who then recounts the story of Hawke, the refugee-turned-"Champion of Kirkwall" and player character. As the story plays out, Cassandra occasionally interrupts to either call Varric out on lying at certain parts or to offer commentary on the events. At the end of the game, it is revealed that the Circle of Magi and the Templar Order, a Chantry group dedicated to watching over or "imprisoning" mages, have both gone rogue and are warring in the streets, and Cassandra seeks Hawke to help resolve the conflict, no longer blaming them for starting it. Laidlaw commented that, in his view, Cassandra has in some ways the "biggest transformative arc" of all the characters in the game.

=== Dawn of the Seeker ===
Cassandra next appears in Dragon Age: Dawn of the Seeker, a CGI-anime film by Funimation released in 2012, which explores her backstory and how she comes to be known as the Right Hand of the Divine. Dawn of the Seeker tells the story of a younger Cassandra who, through the last acts of her mentor Byron, learns of a plot by a coven of blood mages to bring down the entire Chantry. The blood mages have discovered a girl who has the ability to control dragons and attempts to use her to usher in a new era of magic domination. It falls to Cassandra, one of the last dragon hunters, to stop the blood mages.

=== Inquisition ===
Cassandra is one of two returning characters from Dragon Age II in 2014's Inquisition, the third main game in the series, along with Varric. Cassandra is a party member and a possible love interest if the player chooses to play a male Inquisitor. The character is of the Warrior class, designed around close-range combat, and by default uses a sword and shield combination though this can be changed if the player wishes. Unlike other party members, she has access to the "Templar" skill tree, which is based around nullifying magical effects and fighting demons, one type of enemy found in the game, as well as providing support and buffs for other party members.

The character is introduced interrogating the Inquisitor at the start of the game, who is the sole survivor of a large explosion that has ripped open the sky, causing demons to fall out, and killed the Divine, many mages, and many templars during their peace talks. She immediately joins the party and, after the Inquisitor temporarily seals the "Breach" in the sky, protests the player's innocence and forms the Inquisition, breaking away from the Chantry. Depending on the player's choices throughout the game, she may at its end be crowned Divine. If so, she ushers in an age of reform.

Her personal quest, which each party member has, concerns her discovery that the other Seekers are all going missing. If the player chooses to complete it, they discover that Lord-Seeker Lucius has been luring the Seekers away to be killed, intending to wipe out the order due to their duplicity, attributing the ongoing mage/templar war to them. Lucis hands Cassandra a book full of Seeker secrets, and after Lucius is defeated and the Inquisitor and Cassandra return to base, Cassandra reads it and discovers the Seekers had knowledge vital to stopping the war. The player may choose to encourage her to rebuild the Seekers reformed, leave them, or let her make her own decision.

== Reception ==
Cassandra's depiction in Dawn of the Seeker was met with mixed reviews. Prior to the release of Inquisition, Kimberly Wallace of Game Informer considered the potential of her return to the series, and thought she could be interesting due to the mystery surrounding her, what she could bring to the group, and how she could develop.

After Inquisition's release, Cassandra received a positive reception. Ray Ivey of Just Adventure noted how, while she seemed "cold and unappealing at first", she grew on him. Joe Juba, also from Game Informer, called the character his new "Garrus", a popular party member in the Mass Effect series. He appreciated her "detailed and believable character", as well as how she took a more measured approach instead of dealing in extremities. Wallace also included the character in their list of "the 10 best sidekicks" in 2014, commenting "she battles with you, but she's also an amazing adviser."

Inquisition got attention for its female characters. Danielle Riendeau, writing for Polygon, praised the female characters, stating that they all were "written with care, attention to detail, and enormous respect". Susan Arendt noted how the majority of the Inquisition's leaders were female, and how this was not made a point in Inquisition. Arendt commented that had Cassandra been a man, little would change, "but that's exactly why it's so encouraging for her to be a woman". GamesRadar's Ashley Reed and Andy Hartup listed her as one of the "most inspirational female characters in games", writing "Cassandra's an unstoppable storm, but one with a calm and quiet eye, too."
