= Rage 2 =

First-person shooter video game

- Developers: Avalanche Studios id Software
- Publisher: Bethesda Softworks
- Director: Magnus Nedfors
- Producers: Susan Paula Holman; Erik Olsen; Anders Strid
- Programmers: Stefan Dagnell; Fredrik Egeberg; Alvar Jansson
- Artist: Jeremy Miller
- Writers: Odd Ahlgren; Loke Wallmo
- Composers: Johan Nilsson; Andreas Kinger; Eirik Røland (Note: Additional music by Jukka Rintamäki)
- Platforms: PlayStation 4; Windows; Xbox One; Stadia
- Release: PS4, Windows, Xbox One; May 14, 2019; Stadia; November 19, 2019
- Genre: First-person shooter
- Mode: Single-player

Rage 2 is a 2019 first-person shooter video game developed by Avalanche Studios in conjunction with id Software and published by Bethesda Softworks. The game is the sequel to the 2011 game Rage. The game was released for PlayStation 4, Windows, and Xbox One on May 14, 2019. It received mixed reviews from critics, with praise for its combat but criticism for its story, characters, and open world gameplay.

== Gameplay ==
Rage 2 is a first-person shooter. Players assume control of a ranger named Walker, who is free to explore the game's apocalyptic open world. Players are given control over some of Walker's attributes, such as their gender, skills, or attire. Walker is able to wield various firearms and tools to fight against enemies, including returning weapons such as the wingstick. Players can develop Walker's skills with Nanotrite-based powers. Through a mode called Overdrive, Walker's guns do more damage, enemies drop more energy and they get healed constantly — providing players with an aggressive way to mow down enemies. Nanotrites from the first game, which act as special powers and ability boosts, can be used to increase combat efficiency. The game features vehicular combat, including trucks, buggies and gyrocopters, with the player being able to drive any vehicle in the game's world.

== Plot ==
Players assume control of Walker, the last Ranger of Vineland, who must survive in a world inhabited by dangerous mutants and crazed bandits after it was hit by the asteroid 99942 Apophis. The majority of mankind died during this apocalyptic event. While new settlements and factions emerged, a group called the Authority declared themselves the new military power. The game's prologue begins in Walker's home, Vineland, a city founded by former Ark residents and their descendants. Vineland gets stormed by the Authority's rebuilt Abadon mutant armies, and Walker's adoptive Aunt Prowley is killed by General Cross. Prowley leaves a pre-recorded holotape asking Walker to carry out Project Dagger, a mission conceived to stop General Cross. Walker is inducted as the last Ranger, a group of Ark survivors whose nanotrite-powered suits give them enhanced combat abilities. They are asked by Prowley's recording to find the three other members of Project Dagger; Loosum Hagar, Marshall, and Dr. Kvasir. Prowley's biological daughter, Lily, provides Walker with the Phoenix, an indestructible vehicle to travel the Wasteland, and promises to rebuild Vineland in the Ranger's absence.

Marshall is found in the town of Gunbarrel. Walker is asked to assist him in restoring power to Gunbarrel and retrieving Gulo, a scout sent by Marshall from an hostile enemy clan named the Immortal Shrouded. The scout's last defiant act was to swallow the recorder with the bunker's location, which Walker recovers from her already-carved-out gut. They proceed to the bunker, wiping out both the Immortal Shrouded and the Authority patrol sent to dislodge them, and secures the data necessary to penetrate the Authority's security scans.

Loosum Hagar is the mayor of Wellspring, a major travel hub in the Wasteland. When Walker arrives at her office, the Ranger is forced to fight off an assassination attempt against the mayor, who she suspects Wasteland tycoon Klegg Clayton of masterminding the attack. Klegg tries to kill Walker after admitting he was on a first name basis with General Cross. Fighting through Klegg's henchmen, Walker warns Loosum of the plot against Wellspring and uncovers a Xerxes MK III Authority Predator tank hidden in Klegg's catacombs beneath the town. The Ranger follows Klegg to an Authority bunker, to witness General Cross put down his unsuccessful lackey for failing to deliver Wellspring. Exploring deeper into the facility, Walker finds evidence that the Authority is building massive Abadon mutants piece by piece, calling them "Titans" and planning to unleash them on the rest of the Wasteland. Walker tears the fusion core out of a huge, half-build Titan, causing a chain reaction that destroys the facility and simultaneously securing a power source for the Xerxes III Predator tank that is necessary to complete Project Dagger.

Dr. Anton Kvasir is a master of genetic manipulation tasked to create a nanotrite virus that would disable General Cross' ability to clone himself indefinitely to prolong his life. The scientist invites Walker into his sanctum, where he says he is held back from finishing his project by insufficient computing power. Walker is asked to land Eco-Pod 15, the last of a series of satellites tasked with re-seeding the Earth with life in the event that the Apophis meteor rendered the planet barren after impact. After entering EDEN Space Center, Kvasir hacks the Vault mainframe to grant Walker the status of POTUS to ensure they can access every aspect of the EDEN Project. Successful in lowering Eco-Pod 15 back to Earth, Walker slaves its processor to Kvasir's mainframe before being forced to fight off an Authority strike force. Kvasir sends Walker on a mission to retrieve a DNA sample from General Cross. Raiding an Authority base for the sample, Walker frees captives from Vineland whose DNA was used in horrific cloning and mutant experiments. Walker decapitates General Cross after defeating him in battle, though a fresh clone of the General escapes. Back at Kvasir's lab, the doctor uses Cross' severed head to produce the nanotrite virus that was his part of Project Dagger.

With the three components, Walker initiates the final phase of Project Dagger by infiltrating the Authority HQ. Able to gain entry to the compound by impersonating General Cross, the Ranger is discovered by the real general. General Cross meets Walker while riding a gigantic Cyber Titan, and the two battle. Killing the Titan, Walker stabs Cross in the eye with the Nanotrite Virus, causing his DNA to be corrupted to prevent future clones from being created. However, unbeknownst to Walker due to Kvasir's manipulation, the Ranger's own nanotrites are also susceptible to the virus. Choking to death alongside the broken body of General Cross, Walker is saved by the intervention of Lily, who returns them to Hagar's Wellspring office for medical treatment. With Lily's gun to his head, Dr. Kvasir works frantically to save the Ranger. When he succeeds, the doctor begs for his life from the enraged Lily, who spares him. The game ends with Walker regaining consciousness and thanking Lily for her help, promising to continue helping the Wasteland as the Last Ranger.

== Development ==
Rage 2 is a joint development between id Software and Avalanche Studios. Avalanche was selected as the collaboration partner for the project as id Software was impressed by Avalanche's work on Just Cause 3, especially its physics-based emergent gameplay. According to Tim Willits, the team hoped that the sequel could deliver on the promise made by the first game, which was limited by technology during its time of release. Willits added that Rage 2 was designed to be the player's "power fantasy", thus they ensured that they will not feel underpowered at the beginning of the game. The game features a colorful color palette so as to distinguish itself from other id Software games. Rage 2 utilizes Avalanche Studios' proprietary Apex game engine instead of id Tech, which had been used for the predecessor. The Apex engine allowed the team to create detailed indoor environments as well as broad outdoor locations, also allowing players to transition between these worlds without any loading screens. The game engine uses the Vulkan API exclusively with HLSL shaders.

A sequel to Rage was hinted by Bethesda's Pete Hines, who believed that both Rage and The Evil Within had sold enough to warrant sequels. In mid-May 2018, rumors of the sequel were fueled when Walmart Canada's website updated its video game sections with several as-yet-unannounced titles, which included Rage 2. Bethesda poked fun at Walmart over social media in the following days, but this turned into more direct hints of the sequel's existence. Bethesda formally revealed Rage 2 on May 14, 2018 with a teaser trailer and a gameplay trailer the next day. The game was released on PlayStation 4, Windows, and Xbox One on May 14, 2019. The game's Collector Edition, which includes a severed mutant head voiced by Andrew W.K., is set to be released alongside the standard edition. Players who preordered the game will have access to an exclusive mission and additional gameplay items. Willits revealed that the game will be a game as a service, and he promised that lootboxes would not be present in the game. Rage 2 was released on Steam with Denuvo digital rights management. However, the game was cracked within a day because the version on Bethesda's own store did not use Denuvo. Denuvo was subsequently removed from the Steam release.

An expansion pack titled Rise of the Ghosts was released on September 26, 2019. It introduced cheats, new vehicles, a new story, and pilotable mechs to the game. The game was made available for Stadia as a launch title for the console on November 19, 2019.

== Reception ==
Reception

Aggregate score
Aggregator	Score
Metacritic	(PC) 73/100 (XONE) 72/100 (PS4) 67/100

Review scores
Publication	Score
Destructoid	8/10
Game Informer	7/10
GameSpot	6/10
GamesRadar+	3/5
IGN	8/10
Jeuxvideo.com	17/20
USgamer	4/5

On release, Rage 2 received "mixed or average reviews" according to the review aggregator website Metacritic.

Daniel Tack from Game Informer rated the game a 7/10, praising the game's shooting mechanics and music but criticized the visuals, open-world and characters. Dan Stapleton from IGN gave a rating of 8/10, comparing the game to 2016's Doom, praising the game for its gunplay and the open-world gameplay as well as the abilities and the visual style, but felt bemused about the use of microtransactions as it featured no co-op or multiplayer. Michael Higham from GameSpot gave the game a 6/10, praising the game's combat and abilities, but criticized the humor, short length, narrative, characters, gameplay and side activities.

Rage 2 was the best-selling retail game in the United Kingdom in its week of release, beating Days Gone, although its physical sales figures were only 25% of the original game's launch-week sales. In Japan, the PlayStation 4 version Rage 2 was also the best-selling retail game during its first week of release, selling 12,146 copies.
