= Renegade Ops =

2011 video game

- Developer: Avalanche Studios
- Publisher: Sega
- Director: Axel Lindberg
- Producer: Andreas Thorsén
- Programmer: Andreas Tadic
- Writer: Gordon Rennie
- Composer: Johan Nilsson
- Platforms: PlayStation 3 Xbox 360; Windows
- Release: PlayStation 3; 13 September 2011; Xbox 360; 14 September 2011; Windows; 26 October 2011
- Genres: Multidirectional shooter Vehicular combat
- Modes: Single-player, multiplayer

Renegade Ops is a top-down vehicular combat video game with role-playing elements developed by Avalanche Studios and published by Sega. It was released on 13 September 2011 for PlayStation 3 and 14 September 2011 for Xbox 360. The Microsoft Windows version was released on 26 October 2011.

The Steam version of the game includes Gordon Freeman and the buggy he uses in Half-Life 2 as additional bonus characters and vehicle, and the Antlion from the same game as additional special weapon.

Miranda Raison provides the voice of Natasha in the game.

== Reception ==
Reception

Aggregate score
Aggregator	Score
Metacritic	PC: 76/100; PS3: 80/100; X360: 81/100

The game holds an 81 and 80 for Xbox 360 and PlayStation 3 on Metacritic, respectively, indicating generally positive reviews.

As of 2011, the game sold over 25,000 copies on Xbox Live Arcade.
