= TheHunter =

Video game series

theHunter
- theHunter series logo as of Call of the Wild
- Genre: Simulation
- Developers: Avalanche Studios (2009–2015); Expansive Worlds (2015–2017)
- Publishers: Emote Games (2009); Avalanche Studios (2015); Expansive Worlds (2015–present)
- Platforms: Microsoft Windows; PlayStation 4; Xbox One; PlayStation 5; Xbox Series X/S
- First release: theHunter: Classic; April 2009
- Latest release: theHunter: Call of the Wild; 16 February 2017

theHunter is a series of simulation video games developed by Expansive Worlds and published by its parent company, Avalanche Studios. The first game in the series, known as theHunter: Classic, was developed and published by Emote Games, in association with Avalanche Studios, and released in April 2009. Subsequently, Avalanche Studios bought the rights to the franchise and opened Expansive Worlds as a subsidiary that would exclusively focus on theHunter development. A standalone expansion, theHunter: Primal, was developed and published by Expansive Worlds and Avalanche Studios, and released on March 15, 2015. The most recent entry in the series, theHunter: Call of the Wild, was developed by Expansive Worlds and published by Avalanche Studios on February 16, 2017.

== Gameplay ==
theHunter games play as first-person hunting games that recreate hunting wild animals in a manner as realistic as possible. The initial setting is on an open world island based on various locations, including the islands and surroundings of Washington state in the United States. The player can hunt from a variety of animals ranging from Deer, Elk, Bears, Rabbits, Birds and other types depending on the reserves.

To play the player must first create a character on the game's website, which includes social networking tools and messaging capabilities to allow players to connect and share in-game experiences. Creating a character requires selecting an avatar from a pool of unique faces, and adding a unique name. Once a character is created and the tutorial completed, the player can hunt freely, activate missions and earn one of two types of in-game currency called gm$. Completing the first 3 whitetail deer missions unlocks further missions from other animals in the game.

Players must use natural cover to avoid detection by the animals in the game; each animal species reacts to different stimuli in different ways. Scent detection for the quadrupeds is their keenest sense, which means the player has to be aware of wind direction or the animal might smell the player's scent and run off. Players must also pay careful attention to the soundscape, listening for subtle signals that indicate the presence of animals in the locality.

The core gameplay revolves around tracking and harvesting (killing) animals with the weapons provided, although a digital camera is also provided for those who do not wish to shoot with a gun or a bow (taking these digital pictures only store in files on computer). Animal tracks can be found and identified with the "Huntermate", an in-game GPS-like device that identifies tracks, scat, rooting, bedding, blood trails, and animal calls and grunts. To hunt certain species, theHunter requires the player to utilise the correct weapon for each hunt. Most bows are considered ethical for all species while rifles, handguns and shotguns of different calibre must be selected according to the animal the player will hunt. Players that break this rule lose a ranking on the animals trophy rating.

Hunting areas added since May 2011 are: Settler Creeks (rugged North American mountain forest with abandoned homesteads); Redfeather Falls (rough Canadian mountains and swamps); Hirschfelden (German highland farms and forests); Hemmeldal (Northern Swedish snowy mountains, swamps and icy lakes), which is also the first reserve to allow hunting during snowfall; Rougarou Bayou (Southern United States); Val des Bois (rugged mountains, meadows and woods in the Alps), Bushranger's Run (dry, rocky and sandy Australian Outback), Whiterime Ridge (chilly arctic landscape surrounded by high mountains and icefields), Timbergold Trails (Rocky Mountains-inspired Reserve), and Piccabeen Bay (Australian tropics-inspired reserve). Subscribers can choose to start anywhere in these hunting areas (provided they have a tent, otherwise a hunting lodge can be chosen to start in a list of two or three in each reserve), and at any time of day, between 5 AM and 6 PM.

== Development ==
=== theHunter: Classic ===
Prior to announcing theHunter: Classic, British developer Emote Games and Swedish developer Avalanche Studios revealed on 8 April 2008 that they had formed a joint venture through which they would create a "unique cross-format socially-enabled game". theHunter was officially announced on 17 September 2008. The game was released as a free-to-play title in April 2009.

Avalanche Studios announced on 18 February 2010 that they had acquired the intellectual property to theHunter: Classic from Emote Games. According to Avalanche Studios' chief technology officer, Linus Blomberg, the studio lost £35 million and 20 employees due to publishing deals in 2009, because of which they sought to take advantage of theHunter: Classic independently. He further noted that, although the game had 100,000 registered users at the time, the number of active users had declined significantly since November 2009. Christofer Sundberg, chief executive officer for Avalanche Studios, explained that the company planned to establish a separately managed subsidiary studio that would focus exclusively on theHunter: Classic. This studio was announced as Expansive Worlds on 23 March 2010, with Stefan Pettersson, previously senior consultant at Netlight Consulting, leading the establishment as managing director. On 9 July 2026, Expansive Worlds announced that development for theHunter: Classic would permanently end. Expansive Worlds also announced that the game would permanently shut down on 11 November 2026, including the deletion of all player accounts and forum content. theHunter: Classic became unavailable for purchase on Steam on 19 August 2026.

=== theHunter: Primal ===
On 24 November 2014, Expansive Worlds announced theHunter: Primal, a standalone expansion to theHunter that would feature dinosaurs. The game was made available through Steam Early Access on 15 December 2014, and was fully released on 31 March 2015. The game was developed and published collaboratively by Expansive Worlds and Avalanche Studios.

=== theHunter: Call of the Wild ===
A sequel to both games, titled theHunter: Call of the Wild, was announced on 28 November 2016. This time developed by Expansive Worlds and only published by Avalanche Studios, the game was released on 16 February 2017. Expansive Worlds confirmed on 27 March 2017 that the game would also receive ports for PlayStation 4 and Xbox One. These were released on 2 October 2017.

The game continued to receive development throughout 2019 with the introduction of TruRacs, an implementation of random rack design being applied to animals with racks that provides more diversity in the look of certain animals. Expansive Worlds announced that they aim to include TruRacs for all species that have horn/antler variations within the game.

In January 2020, Expansive Worlds announced a beta which would look at changes to weapons and scoring of the animal system in the game to make the game more in line with simulation play and provide a better overall experience. With feedback provided the Expansive Worlds team launched a second round of their beta in late January to further get feedback on the proposed Scoring 2.0 system. The Animal Scoring System 2.0 went live on 18 February 2020.

To date, Expansive Worlds has released nineteen hunting reserves for theHunter: Call of the Wild:

Africa

- Vurhonga Savanna (2018), Southern Africa

Asia

- Medved-Taiga National Park (2017), Siberia, Russia
- Sundarpatan Hunting Reserve (2024), Nepal

Europe

- Hirschfelden Hunting Reserve (2017), Central Europe
- Cuatro Colinas Game Reserve (2019), Spain
- Revontuli Coast (2022), Finland
- Salzwiesen Park (2024), Schleswig-Holstein, Germany
- Tòrr nan Sithean (2025), Scotland

Oceania

- Te Awaroa National Park (2020), New Zealand
- Emerald Coast Australia (2023), Australia

North America

- Layton Lake District (2017), Pacific Northwest
- Yukon Valley (2019), Yukon River Basin, Alaska
- Silver Ridge Peaks (2020), Colorado, U.S.
- Mississippi Acres Preserve (2021), Mississippi, U.S.
- Rancho del Arroyo (2021), Sonora, Mexico
- New England Mountains (2022), New Hampshire, U.S.
- Askiy Ridge Hunting Reserve (2025), Alberta, Canada
- Goodnight Ranch (2026), Texas, U.S.

South America

- Parque Fernando (2018), Patagonia, Argentina
- Intisuyu Hunting Preserve (2026), Peru
