= Second Extinction =

Cancelled video game

- Developer: Systemic Reaction
- Publisher: Systemic Reaction
- Platforms: Windows; Xbox One; Xbox Series X/S
- Release: October 13, 2020 (early access)
- Genre: First-person shooter
- Modes: Single-player, multiplayer

Second Extinction was a cooperative first-person shooter developed and published by Systemic Reaction for Windows, Xbox One, and Xbox Series X/S. In the game, mutated dinosaurs have taken over the Earth, and players must work together in fighting a war against the animals. The game received an early access release through Steam on October 13, 2020, and through Xbox Game Preview on April 28, 2021.

Originally scheduled to leave early access on October 20, 2022, the full launch was delayed several times due to unspecified issues, before being cancelled in October 2023. The game had been in development by a small 35-person team which lacked the resources necessary to continue. The game servers were scheduled to shut down in 2024.

== Gameplay ==
Second Extinction was a first-person shooter, and a live service game, with content updates being made regularly. Because the game was always online, it never included a pause feature.

The game's premise revolves around mutated dinosaurs taking over the Earth. A group of human survivors retreated to an orbital station, and eventually returned to Earth, launching a war against the dinosaurs. The animals work together against the player. Enemies include raptors and T. rexes. Because all the dinosaurs are mutated, they possess unusual features, including the ability to generate electricity to launch shock attacks. Some dinosaurs can spit acid, while others can dig underground, or can call reinforcements.

The game can be played solo, but is primarily meant as a three-player cooperative video game. The game has several playable characters, who are divided into different classes, each one with its own weapons. The player can request additional ammunition and health to be airdropped into the environment.

The game has various locations, including caves where dinosaur nests must be destroyed. The game has four threat levels (low, medium, high, and emergence), which are applied to each area depending on the local dinosaur population. Players' success in the war effort will reduce threat levels in parts of the world, although the dinosaurs will turn elsewhere in response, increasing the threat level wherever they go. Threat levels are updated each week. The game has several weather conditions, such as snow storms, and some gameplay takes place at night.

An update in September 2021 added a horde mode and a new playable character for a total of six. Full crossplay support, matchmaking lobbies, and voice chat were also added.

== Development and release ==
Second Extinction was announced on May 7, 2020. It was developed by Systemic Reaction, a newly formed self-publishing division of Avalanche Studios Group. The game was developed by a small team of 35 people, based in Malmö, Sweden. The dinosaurs were designed as mutants in order to portray them with monstrous elements. Gameplay was designed to be exceptionally challenging unless playing with other people. Systemic Reaction developed the game using its Apex game engine, which allowed for a high level of detail, particularly when killing dinosaurs. Producer Brynley Gibson said that with the engine, "no two dismembered raptors even look the same as they sail through the air." The game also features an abundance of explosions.

Second Extinction was released for computer platforms, via Steam Early Access, on October 13, 2020. At the time, Systemic Reaction stated that the game still had a number of glitches which would be gradually corrected. The game would remain in Early Access for an undetermined amount of time while the issues were worked out. The game was released for Windows, Xbox One and Xbox Series X/S on April 28, 2021, via Xbox Game Preview and Xbox Game Pass. The full game was scheduled to launch on Xbox and Windows platforms on October 20, 2022. However, the release was delayed until the following month, and was later pushed back to 2023. The delays were a result of unspecified "critical issues".

In October 2023, Systemic Reaction announced cancellation of the full launch, due to a lack of necessary resources to leave early access. The company stated that Second Extinction would be removed from sale, and that its early access servers would be shut down in 2024, making the game unplayable to those who purchased it. The development team did not have the resources to add an offline mode, which would have required significant changes to the game.

== Reception ==
The game had a "Mostly Positive" rating among Steam players. David Jagneaux of IGN concluded, "As far as Early Access games go, Second Extinction is in excellent shape. For all intents and purposes, it feels very close to being finished already". Chris Jarrard of Shacknews praised the graphics in the Early Access version, while some critics found the weapons to be dissatisfying. Gameplay was compared to other games such as Left 4 Dead, Destiny 2, the Turok series, and Avalanche's Generation Zero.
