= Miranda Raison =

British actress (born 1977)

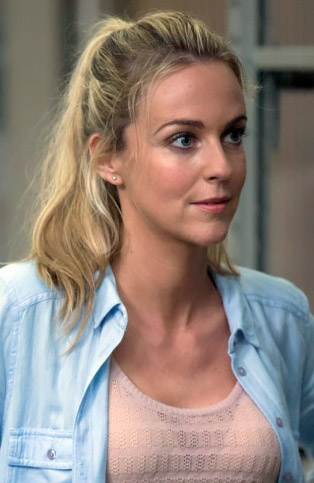
- Raison in 2014
- Born: Miranda Caroline Raison; 18 November 1977 (age 48); Burnham Thorpe, Norfolk, England
- Citizenship: British, French
- Occupations: Actor; narrator
- Years active: 1999–present
- Spouses: Raza Jaffrey (m. 2007; div. 2009) Christopher Mollard (m. 2017)
- Children: 2
- Relatives: Paul Raison (cousin); Jack Huston (cousin)

Miranda Caroline Raison (born 18 November 1977) is a British actress who is best known for playing Jo Portman in five seasons of Spooks (MI5), Nellie Davenport in HBO's Warrior and for various leading roles in Spotless, Vexed, Silk, Plus One, Dark Heart, Married, Single, Other, Sister Boniface Mysteries and Nightflyers.

On stage she is known for originating the title role of Anne Boleyn in Howard Brenton's eponymous play at Shakespeare's Globe Theatre, originating the role of 'Woman' in The River by Jezz Butterworth at The Royal Court Theatre, playing 'Hermione' in Kenneth Branagh's production of The Winter's Tale opposite Branagh and Judi Dench and playing Ellen Terry opposite Ralph Fiennes as Henry Irving in Grace Pervades by David Hare.

She is also an award-winning voice artist.

== Early life and education ==
Miranda Caroline Raison was born in Burnham Thorpe, Norfolk. Her mother is former Anglia News reader Caroline Raison (née Harvey). Her father, Nick Raison, is a jazz pianist who accompanied the BBC National Orchestra of Wales when Raison played a showgirl in the Doctor Who episodes "Daleks in Manhattan" and "Evolution of the Daleks".

Raison's parents divorced when she was five years old. From a young age she attended five boarding schools, including Gresham's School, Felixstowe College and Stowe School; her education was paid for by her grandfather.

It was at Felixstowe College where she developed an interest in acting; she moved there after experiencing bullying at her previous school. She trained at the Webber Douglas Academy of Dramatic Art.

== Career ==
=== Theatre ===
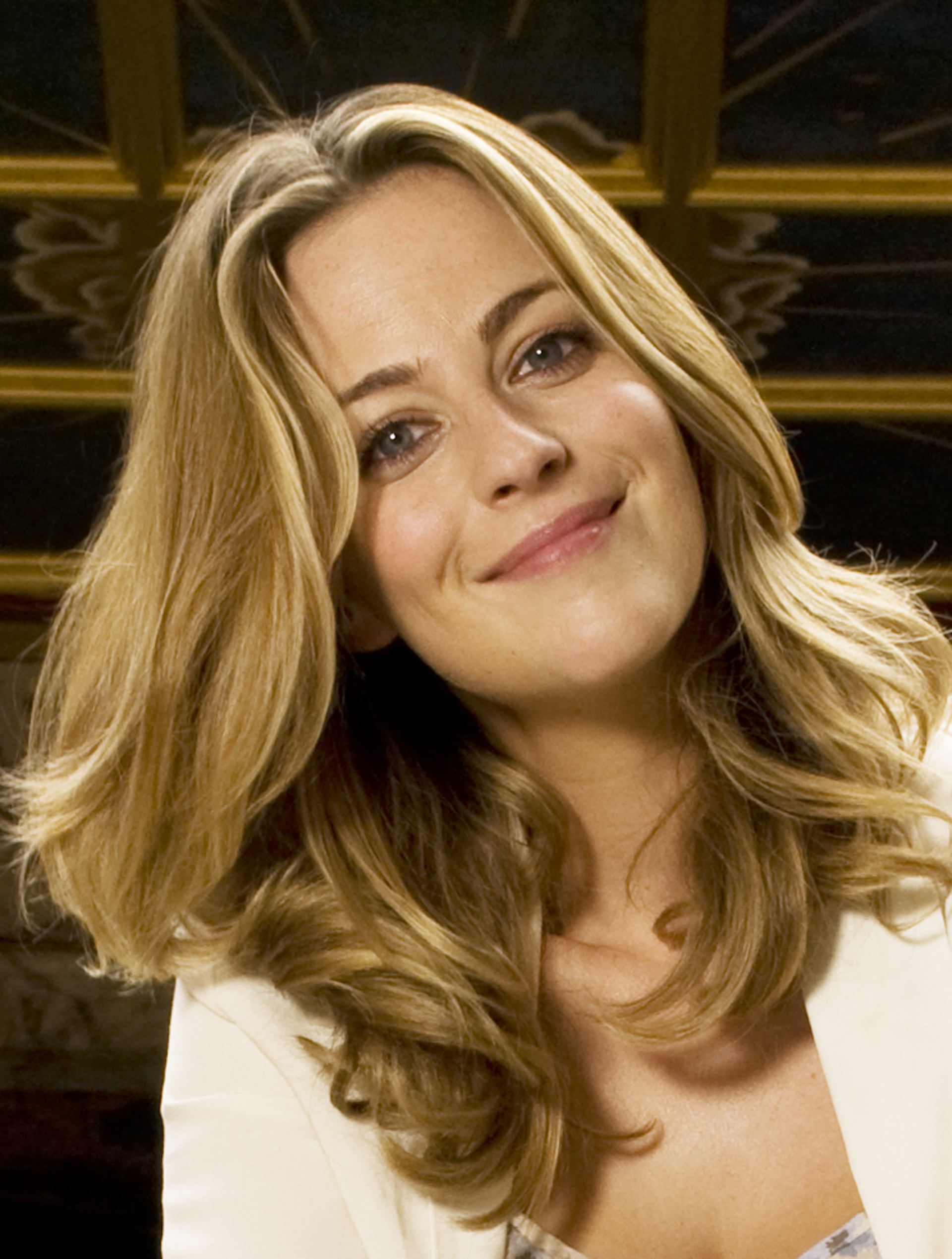
Raison at Shakespeare's Globe, 2013

From 2002 to 2003, she appeared as Ben-Hur's love interest in a minimalist production of the eponymous play at the Battersea Arts Centre. Later in 2003, she was featured in Pains of Youth, again at the Battersea Arts Centre, playing the death obsessed bisexual Desiree; Lyn Gardner of The Guardian described her performance as making "Desiree's death wish seem tragic rather than merely silly."

In 2010, she played the title role in Anne Boleyn, a new play by Howard Brenton, who had also been involved in scripts for BBC's Spooks in which Raison went on to appear in 5 series, which premiered at Shakespeare's Globe on 24 July 2010. In the same Shakespeare's Globe season, Raison also played Anne Boleyn in Henry VIII by William Shakespeare.

In 2011, she appeared as Ann in the short play "Oliver Lewis" by Jack Thorne, part of the series of plays 66 Books performed at the Bush Theatre.

In June/July 2012, she appeared in a production of The Physicists: A Comedy in Two Acts at the Donmar Warehouse, playing the roles of Lina Rose, the lead character's ex-wife, and Monika Settler, the lead's attending nurse. From October 2012 Raison starred in The River, a new play by Jez Butterworth, at the Royal Court Theatre (Jerwood) alongside Dominic West. Tickets became "the most sought-after theatre tickets in London" after rave reviews.

In 2013–14, she played Anne Faulkner in the theatrical version of Strangers on a Train at the Gielgud Theatre, produced by Barbara Broccoli.

From January to February 2015, she starred opposite Shaun Evans in Hello/Goodbye at the Hampstead Theatre. In August 2015 she joined the Kenneth Branagh Theatre Company in The Winter's Tale and Harlequinade which ran at the Garrick Theatre from October 2015 until January 2016. Raison played the wife of Kenneth Branagh's character in both plays. She stated that she enjoyed the experience and was grateful for the opportunity, given that previously she had a bad audition with Branagh for Macbeth in 2011. She also enjoyed learning from Judi Dench.

Raison played Ellen Terry opposite Ralph Fiennes as Henry Irving in Grace Pervades, a new play by David Hare, directed by Jeremy Herrin, at the Theatre Royal Bath, from 27 June to 19 July 2025. It marked Raison's return to the stage after nearly a decade. The play transferred to the Theatre Royal Haymarket with the same cast in the Spring of 2026 with Raison and Fiennes garnering positive reviews for their performances, with Susannah Clapp in The Observer writing 'Miranda Raison exactly, finely, suggests both intelligence and lightness, the rare marvel of an actor (Atkins is another, Carey Mulligan a third) who seems not to project but to transmit.'. Many critics also praised the chemistry between Raison and Fiennes with Mark Lawson in The Guardian calling the pair 'exceptional' and Dominic Cavendish in The Telegraph praising 'two standout performances'.

=== Film and television ===
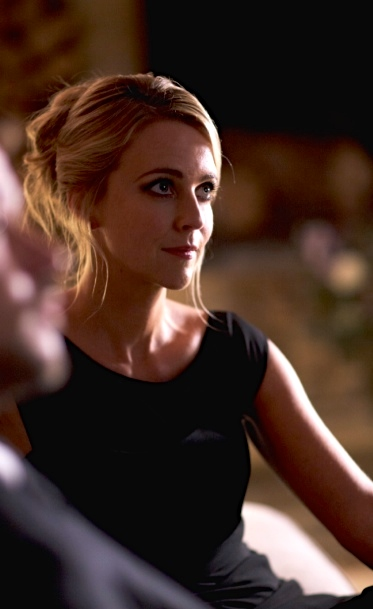
Raison in 2014

Raison's first film role in 2000 was playing Marianne Faithfull in Suzy Q alongside Carice Van Houten

In 2004, Raison was cast as 'Heather' in Match Point, the first Woody Allen film to be made in London.

In 2005, she appeared in Deuce Bigalow: European Gigolo, which she said "may as well have been the most brutal Lars von Trier film. Another actress and I actually spent a whole night just crying." She called the experience "regrettable from start to finish" and a "hideous, hideous moment and a great lapse of judgement on my part".

Raison's breakthrough role was as Jo Portman (2005–2009) in the BBC One television drama series Spooks (also broadcast under the title MI-5). She requested that the production company let her go in 2009 as she felt that her character could not develop further and wanted to follow up on theatre opportunities.

In April 2007, she appeared in the Doctor Who episodes "Daleks in Manhattan" and "Evolution of the Daleks" as Tallulah, a show girl whose opening scene involved singing to a musical number, for which Raison's father played the piano background as part of the BBC National Orchestra of Wales.

In 2009, she was featured in the show Plus One. She was originally featured in the Comedy Showcase pilot in 2007, where she wore a fat suit.

In 2010, after leaving Spooks, she played a model called Abbey in the ITV1 comedy-drama Married Single Other.

She had a small role in My Week with Marilyn. She expressed pleasure in being able to work with great British talent and her fascination with Marilyn Monroe.

In 2012, she played DI Georgina Dixon in the second series of Vexed, screened on BBC2.

In 2013, she played 'Harriet Hammond' in the third series of the BBC legal drama Silk; her character was a practice manager who shook up the firm and a potential love interest for her former Spooks co-star Rupert Penry-Jones' character.

In 2014, she had a small role in I Am Soldier, playing "Stella", the lead interrogator in the "Tactical Questioning" portion of the lead character's training.

In July 2014, she was announced as a new cast member of Spotless, a (10 × 1 hour episode) drama produced by Canal+.

In 2018, Raison reprised her role as 'Sylvie' in 6 episodes of Dark Heart, played xenobiologist 'Tessia' in 6 episodes of Nightflyers and appeared in Artemis Fowl.

In May 2019, it was announced that Raison would be joining the main cast of Warrior for the second season.

In September 2021, it was announced that Raison had joined the first series of Sister Boniface Mysteries playing Ruth Penny, a main character across all ten episodes.

Raison reprised her role as 'Nellie Davenport', as part of the main cast of the third season of Warrior which began airing on HBO in July 2023.

In April 2023, she was cast as Jean Seberg in L'Enchanteur opposite Charles Berling as Romain Gary which was aired on France 2 in 2024.

== Other work ==
In 2005, Raison appeared in the BBC radio comedy Deep Trouble. She has voiced several video game characters, including Cassandra Pentaghast in the Dragon Age series, Lieutenant Sandra Lansing in Apache: Air Assault and Natasha and other characters in Renegade Ops. BioWare also hired Raison for providing several voices in Mass Effect: Andromeda. She voiced three characters in The Secret World and lent her voice for Dreamfall Chapters and Blades of Time. Raison has voiced Cassandra Pentaghast since 2014, which won her the BTVA Video Game Voice Acting Award for "Best Vocal Ensemble in a Video Game" in 2015 and a nomination for Best Lead Female Actor in a Video Game.

She has also acted in several Big Finish Doctor Who audios, including The Davros Mission and The Wreck of the Titan, has played Constance Clarke, a regular companion to the Sixth Doctor since 2015 and provides additional voices in other Big Finish audio productions, including other Doctor Who stories and The Avengers.

Raison won the Earphones Award for The Screaming Staircase in 2013 and the Audies Award for The Book of Doors in 2025

In 2013, she joined the CGI series cast of Thomas & Friends and provides the voice of Millie (UK/US), first introduced in King of the Railway.

Since July 2017, she has been narrating the BBC Two documentary Hospital.

Since 2024 Raison has been narrating the This World series for BBC One.

== Personal life ==
Raison plays golf and is a member of the Aldeburgh Golf Club.

While separated from her first husband, Raza Jaffrey, she began a relationship with her Married Single Other co-star Ralf Little in November 2009, which ended in February 2013.

She married again in 2017 and had a daughter in that same year. In the summer of 2022, Raison gave birth to her second child. Her husband is 13 years her junior.

Raison has dual nationality and holds both French and British passports. She speaks fluent French and is conversational in Italian and Spanish.

Raison is a cousin to Jack Huston and Paul Raison, who was a Chairman of Christie's.

She has been a patron of the charity Home-Start Suffolk since 2020.

Raison does not drink alcohol.

== Filmography ==
=== Film ===
| Year | Title | Role | Notes |
|---|---|---|---|
| 1999 | Suzy Q | Marianne Faithfull | Television film |
| 2003 | The Private Life of Samuel Pepys | Deb Willet | Television film |
| 2004 | The Deal | Virginia | Short film |
| 2005 | Match Point | Heather | Feature film |
| 2005 | Deuce Bigalow: European Gigolo | Svetlana Revenko | Feature film |
| 2006 | Land of the Blind | Daisy | Feature film |
| 2006 | Nostradamus | Henriette | Television film |
| 2008 | Exit Strategy | Wife / Eve Klammer | Short film |
| 2008 | HeavenScent | HeavenScent | Short film; voice role |
| 2011 | My Week with Marilyn | Vanessa | Feature film |
| 2013 | Thomas & Friends: King of the Railway | Millie | Direct-to-video; voice role |
| 2014 | I Am Soldier | Stella | Feature film |
| 2015 | Yussef Is Complicated | Miss Robson | Short film |
| 2015 | AfterDeath | Robyn | Feature film |
| 2017 | My Daughter Is Missing | Sara | Television film |
| 2017 | Breathe | Mary Dawney | Feature film |
| 2017 | Murder on the Orient Express | Sonia Armstrong | Feature film |
| 2019 | Widow's Walk | Eve | Feature film |
| 2020 | Artemis Fowl | Angeline Fowl | Uncredited |
| 2024 | L'Enchanteur | Jean Seberg | Feature film |

=== Television ===
| Year | Title | Role | Notes |
|---|---|---|---|
| 1999 | Heartbeat | Lucy | Episode: "Kindness of Strangers" |
| 2000 | Sunburn | Madeline Chalfont | Episode: "Children and Growing Up" |
| 2001 | Emmerdale | Nurse | Episode: "26th January 2001" |
| 2001 | Perfect Strangers | Young Grace | Miniseries; 3 episodes |
| 2001 | Dark Realm | Nicole | Episode: "Castle Keep" |
| 2002 | The Inspector Lynley Mysteries | Ros | Episode: "For the Sake of Elena" |
| 2003 | Emmerdale | Rosanna Jennings | Episode: "30 June 2003" |
| 2003 | Holby City | Michelle Andrews | Episode: "Me and My Gal" |
| 2004 | Heartbeat | Kate | Episode: "No Hard Feelings" |
| 2005 | Coming Up | Katy | Episode: "Bird's Eye View" |
| 2005–2009 | Spooks | Jo Portman | Series regular; 37 episodes |
| 2007 | Doctor Who | Tallulah | Episodes: "Daleks in Manhattan" & "Evolution of the Daleks" |
| 2007 | Comedy Showcase | Linsey | Episode: "Plus One" |
| 2008 | Agatha Christie's Poirot | Mademoiselle Blanche | Episode: "Cat Among the Pigeons" |
| 2009 | Plus One | Linsey | Series regular; 5 episodes |
| 2010 | Married Single Other | Abbey | Series regular; 6 episodes |
| 2011 | Sugartown | Emily Shirley | Miniseries; 3 episodes |
| 2011 | Death in Paradise | Megan Talbot | Episode: "Missing a Body?" |
| 2011 | Merlin | Isolde | Episode: "The Sword in the Stone" |
| 2012 | Dirk Gently | Kate Edwards | Episode: "Episode 1" |
| 2012 | Vexed | DI Georgina Dixon | Series regular; 6 episodes |
| 2012 | Sinbad | Lara Assuage | Episode: "Fiend or Friend?" |
| 2013 | Jo | Katie Miville | Episode: "Concorde" |
| 2013 | Lewis | Stella Drew | Episode: "Intelligent Design" |
| 2013–2020 | Thomas & Friends | Millie | Voice role |
| 2014 | Silk | Harriet Hammond | Series regular; 6 episodes |
| 2014 | 24: Live Another Day | Caroline Fowlds | Series regular; 6 episodes |
| 2015 | Spotless | Julie Greer-Bastière | Series regular; 10 episodes |
| 2018 | Dark Heart | Sylvie | Series regular; 6 episodes |
| 2018 | Nightflyers | Tessia | Series regular; 6 episodes |
| 2022 | Dragon Age: Absolution | Cassandra Pentaghast | Episode: "A Woman Unseen" |
| 2020–2023 | Warrior | Nellie Davenport | Series regular; 17 episodes |
| 2024 | The Chelsea Detective | Nichole Hammond | Episode: "Myths And Legends" |
| 2022–2025 | Sister Boniface Mysteries | Ruth Penny | Recurring character; 14 episodes |

=== Video games ===
| Year | Game | Role | Notes |
|---|---|---|---|
| 2010 | Apache: Air Assault | Lieutenant Sandra Lansing | Voice role |
| 2011 | Dragon Age II | Cassandra Pentaghast / Varania / Dulci de Launcet / Elsa | Voice role |
| 2011 | Renegade Ops | Natasha | English version; voice role |
| 2012 | Blades of Time | Ayumi / Spirit of the Dragon | Voice role |
| 2012 | The Secret World | Zaha / Rada Nastase / Aveline Belmont | Voice role |
| 2014 | Dreamfall Chapters | Nela / Na'ane | Voice role |
| 2014 | Dragon Age: Inquisition | Cassandra Pentaghast | Voice role |
| 2015 | Dragon Age: Inquisition – Trespasser | Cassandra Pentaghast | Voice role |
| 2017 | Mass Effect: Andromeda | Mariette Rensus / Saneris / Annea / Ljeta / Revia Luxen | Voice role |
| 2019 | Anthem | Kista Stormbreaker / Varice Mal / Detective Hops | Voice role |
| 2022 | Elden Ring | Fia | Voice role |
