= Stuart Williams =

Stuart Williams may refer to:

- Stuart Williams (cricketer) (born 1969), West Indian cricketer
- Stuart Williams (cyclist) (born 1967), New Zealand cyclist
- Stuart Williams (footballer) (1930–2013), Wales international footballer
- Stuart Williams (ten-pin bowling) (born 1981)

== See also ==
- Stewart Williams (disambiguation)
