= Avalanche Studios Group =

Swedish video game developer and publisher

- Type: Subsidiary
- Industry: Video games
- Predecessor: Rock Solid Games
- Founded: March 2003; 23 years ago
- Founders: Linus Blomberg; Christofer Sundberg
- Headquarters: Stockholm, Sweden
- Key people: Stefanía Guðrún Halldórsdóttir (CEO)
- Products: Just Cause series; theHunter series; Mad Max; Renegade Ops
- Number of employees: 400+ (2025)
- Parent: Nordisk Film (2018–present)
- Subsidiaries: Avalanche Studios; Expansive Worlds AB; Systemic Reaction
- Website: avalanchestudios.com

Avalanche Studios Group is a Swedish video game developer and publisher based in Stockholm. It is a parent company that includes Avalanche Studios, Expansive Worlds, and Systemic Reaction. Founded by Linus Blomberg and Christofer Sundberg in March 2003, Avalanche Studios focuses on developing open world projects and bases them on their proprietary Apex game engine (formerly known as Avalanche Engine). The company is best known for developing the Just Cause and theHunter game series.

Formed after the collapse of Rock Solid Games, the studio gained early success with the first Just Cause title. The team then began Just Cause 2's development, but the company suffered from financial problems due to the cancellations of two contracted projects. Despite missing the release window twice, Just Cause 2 was both a critical and financial success for Avalanche Studios. The company then opened a studio in New York City to work on Just Cause 3, while the Stockholm team began working on Mad Max in collaboration with Warner Bros. Interactive Entertainment. The company announced two titles in 2017, Rage 2 with id Software and a self-published title named Generation Zero. Nordisk Film acquired the company in 2018, having invested in it the year prior.

A casual gaming subsidiary, Expansive Worlds, was established in March 2010 to work on theHunter series. The company aims to begin self-publishing new original intellectual properties in the future. In addition to the office in Stockholm, the company has offices in Malmö and Liverpool.

== History ==
=== Background ===
Avalanche Studios was founded by Linus Blomberg and Christofer Sundberg in 2003. Prior to the establishment of the studio, Sundberg had worked in video game publishing as well as FIFA Soccer for Electronic Arts. Both of them joined Paradox Interactive, a video game publisher that had published games such as Europa Universalis. Eventually, Sundberg and Blomberg left and founded their own company called Rock Solid Studios during the second quarter of 2001. The company partnered with Conspiracy Entertainment to develop a video game adaptation of Tremors, a movie series from Universal Pictures. Titled Tremors: The Game, it was set to be released for personal computers, PlayStation 2, Xbox, and GameCube in 2003. During that period, another Stockholm-based video game development studio, Starbreeze Studios, announced that they would acquire Rock Solid. The agreement between the two companies was ultimately broken by Starbreeze, and the acquisition was stopped. In addition, Universal decided to cancel Tremors: The Game, which led Rock Solid to declare bankruptcy. With the failure and collapse of Rock Solid, Sundberg and Blomberg became unemployed and in debt. They eventually decided to start over in 2003, establishing Avalanche Studios with six other employees. Reflecting on the founding in 2015, Sundberg stated that the studio was born in "pure chaos", and attributed their failure with Rock Solid to trusting "the wrong people".

=== 2003–2010 ===
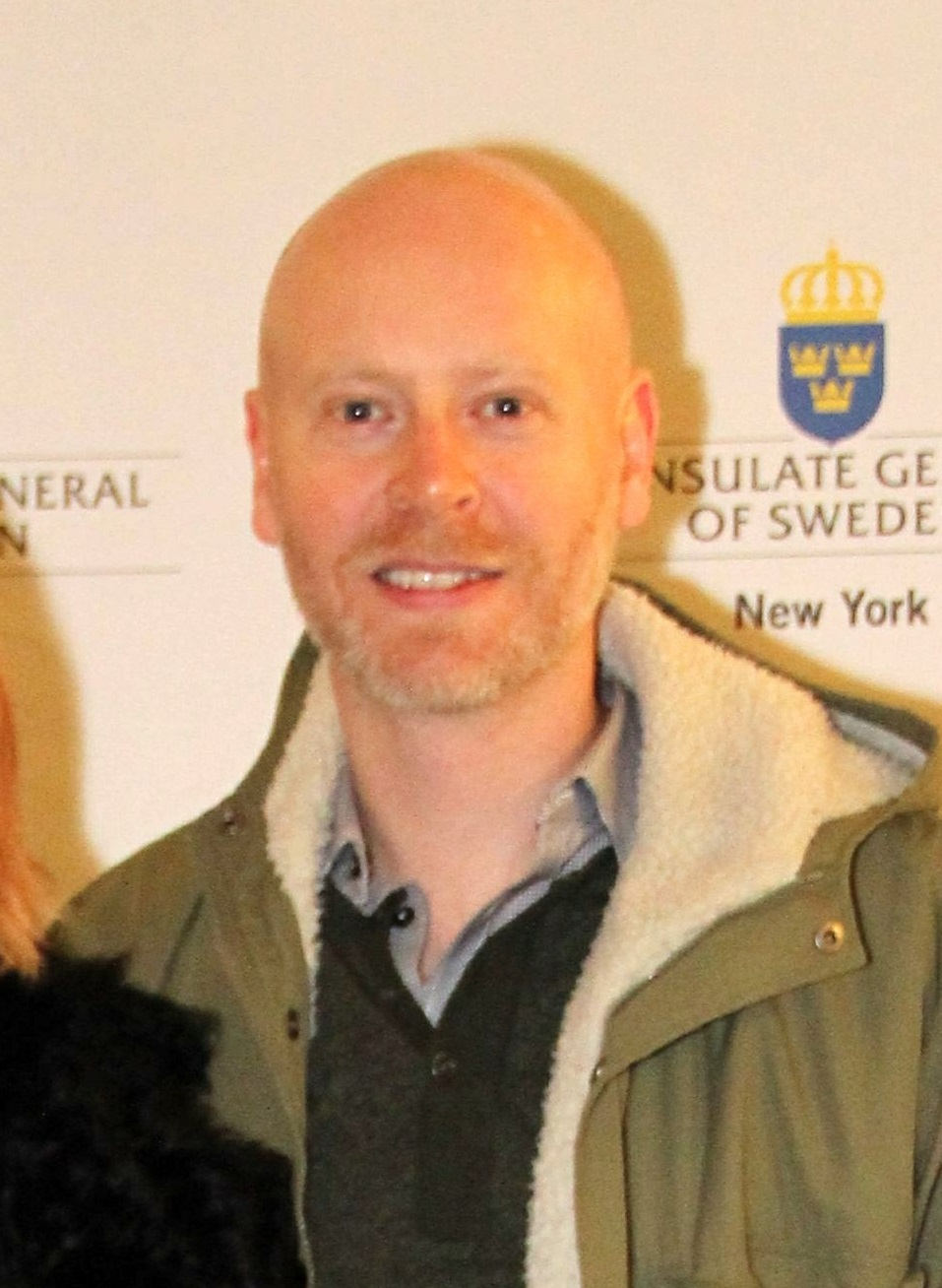
Linus Blomberg, co-founder of Avalanche Studios

When naming the company, Sundberg, Blomberg and the other employees brought up a list of military code words used during World War II. They ultimately decided upon "Avalanche" as the company's name. The company worked on a prototype project called Rico: Terror in the Tropics in 2003. The project, designed by Sundberg himself, would eventually become Avalanche's first title, Just Cause. He pitched the game's concept to publisher Eidos Interactive, which was accepted. According to Sundberg, he wanted to develop a game "where you could skydive onto the roof of a car and keep on going". The game was released in 2006 for Microsoft Windows, PlayStation 2 and Xbox 360. Sundberg considered Just Cause to be the 'DNA' and 'center point of the studio', since it was the first game they developed.

Following Just Cause, Avalanche began to provide technical assistance to theHunter. Originally developed and published by Emote Games, the franchise was acquired by Avalanche on 18 February 2010. As theHunter is an online-activated game, Avalanche established a subsidiary studio called Expansive Worlds on 24 March 2010 to provide support to the continuous development of theHunter. The new studio will also work on new online games. It was a commercial success for Avalanche, with Sundberg claiming that the title "contribute[s] quite a lot to [Avalanche's] financial success". Avalanche considered theHunter to be an experiment for them to see whether the free-to-play business model suited the company or not.

Also in development during Avalanche's work on theHunter was AionGuard and Just Cause 2. AionGuard is a fantasy video game that was ultimately put on hold. Just Cause 2 was announced in January 2008. Powered by the Apex Engine 2.0, Avalanche Studios' in-house engine, the game included several new and improved features. Originally set to be released in 2008, the game subsequently missed its target release window. In 2008, the studio suffered from layoffs; Avalanche dismissed 77 staff members after the company lost approximately US$35 million due to the loss of two contracted projects. One of them was later leaked as Arcadia, a game that once was to be published by THQ. After the incident, Sundberg claimed that the company would remain as a small studio in the future. Just Cause 2 was not released in 2009, which was regarded as "a bad year for most companies including ourselves" by Sundberg. In May 2009, 20 more employees were laid-off. Despite Avalanche's layoffs, development of Just Cause 2 was completed, and the game was launched in March 2010 for Microsoft Windows, PlayStation 3 and Xbox 360. Upon release, Just Cause 2 was proven to be more popular than its predecessors; over 2 million players played the game's demo, and over 6 million players purchased the final game. As the game did not ship with any multiplayer feature, a multiplayer PC mod, which can accommodate more than one thousands players in a single map, was created by a modder. Avalanche Studios supported the mod, made the mod official on 16 December 2013, and released the mod on Steam as free downloadable content for players who had purchased the game.

=== 2011–2018 ===
Upon the completion of Just Cause 2, Avalanche teased a new project. A new downloadable title, called Renegade Ops, was announced on 30 March 2011. The team was approached by Sega to develop a new downloadable intellectual property using the Apex Engine. Compared to their past titles, the game's production and development periods were much shorter. The game drew inspirations from 1986's Jackal, 1992's Desert Strike: Return to the Gulf and 1993's Cannon Fodder. It received generally positive reviews upon its release in October 2011.

On 15 June 2011, Avalanche announced that the company would establish a new division in New York City. The studio was officially opened on 17 November 2011, and the first title set to be developed by the New York division was revealed. Codenamed Project Mamba, the title was a AAA video game set to be released for "next-gen" consoles and PC in 2014. The new studio is located in SoHo, Manhattan, and is led by David Grijns, who was a former employee of Activision and Atari, SA. According to Grijns, Avalanche Studios chose New York City as their location due to less competition. They also aimed to change the "inhospitable" environment of the game industry there.

In 2012, Avalanche began the development of Mad Max. Prior to the game's development, Avalanche had pitched several projects that were set in a post-apocalyptic environment to different publishers. While the original projects never came to fruition, an opportunity was presented to Avalanche Studios by Warner Bros. Interactive Entertainment to develop a video game set within the Mad Max universe. Film director and creator of the Mad Max franchise, George Miller, was consulted during the game's pre-production period. Cory Barlog, the game director of God of War II, joined the studio in 2010 and left in 2012. Prior to his arrival, he had already been working on a Mad Max game with Miller, leading to a confusing relationship between the two projects. In August 2014, Avalanche Studios announced that they were developing several new projects, calling 2015 "the biggest year since the inception of Avalanche Studios more than a decade ago". In addition, the company announced that the Stockholm-based studio would be moved to a larger building for further expansion in the third quarter of 2015. Mad Max was originally set to be released in 2014, but was delayed to September 2015.

While Mad Max was being developed by Avalanche's studio in Stockholm, the New York division was working on Just Cause 3. The development of Just Cause 3 also began in early 2012. While the previous Just Cause games were developed by the Swedish studio, the development of Just Cause 3 was transferred to the American studio to give the title a fresh start. The game was the first title published by Square Enix after their acquisition of Eidos Interactive. Avalanche Studios sent a team to visit a jungle in Costa Rica to inspect the local landscapes and environments to help them create the game worlds for both Mad Max and Just Cause 3. Sundberg considered the collaboration with Square Enix as "a long-term partnership". During Square Enix's E3 2015 press conference, Square Enix of America CEO, Phil Rogers, stated that he considered Just Cause a major franchise that can stand "side by side" with other iconic Square Enix franchises.

In addition to Mad Max and Just Cause 3, a standalone expansion of theHunter featuring dinosaurs, titled theHunter: Primal, was released on Steam's early access on 15 December 2014. The full game was launched on 31 March 2015. The company also released their first mobile title called Rumble City, a strategy board game which takes inspiration from the American bike culture during the 1960s. It was released on 7 July 2015.

In June 2015, vice president of business development Pim Holfve was promoted to Avalanche Studios's chief executive officer, the first to hold this post. In October 2015, the company announced that both the New York office and the Stockholm office suffered minor lay-offs as the studio was undergoing major transition between projects and that it was unable to maintain multiple large teams during this period. In June 2016, the Sweden office announced that they had hired Cameron Foote, the lead designer of Just Cause 2's multiplayer mod, to work on both Avalanche's "present and future projects".

=== 2018–present ===
In May 2018, Avalanche Studios announced that they had established a second Swedish office in Malmö. Avalanche was announced in May 2018 to be co-developer of Rage 2 along with id Software. In a video interview with Game Informer, Sundberg revealed that the company will focus on developing new original intellectual property in the future and, despite continuing to work with other larger publishers, the company's focus will be shifted to self-publishing.

Nordisk Film invested US$10 million into Avalanche Studios in April 2017, acquiring the developer fully on 30 May 2018 for €117 million. In June 2018, Avalanche announced a first-person shooter game, titled Generation Zero, scheduled for release on 26 March 2019. On 10 June 2018, Just Cause 4 was announced at the Xbox Briefing at E3 2018, scheduled for release on 4 December 2018. On 25 June 2018, Avalanche announced that it had 6 projects currently in development. Co-founder Christofer Sundberg left the company in 2019, and said it became "so numbers focused" in 2026 during development of Samson.

The company announced it was reorganising as Avalanche Studios Group in March 2020, serving as a parent company to three subsidiaries, Avalanche Studios (which will continue to handle AAA titles like Rage and Just Cause), Expansive Worlds (for the outdoor themed titles like theHunter), and Systemic Reaction (for the self-publishing division for games like Generation Zero). The company's first UK office was opened in Liverpool in June 2020.

In 2021, the company hired a project lead who had been accused of sexual harassment at their previous company. Despite numerous complaints to the company's management and human resources department, no actions were taken; the person voluntarily resigned in mid-2022. Employees still pressed the leadership on the lack of transparency, and the company posted a public apology to its website in November 2022.

Holfve was replaced by Stefanía Guðrún Halldórsdóttir in March 2023. By October, more than 100 staffers had joined Unionen, Sweden's largest labour union, in hopes to negotiate better contracts. In the same month, Avalanche Studios Group established a Montreal office through its acquisition of Monster Closet, a studio formed by former Ubisoft developers. In April 2024 it was announced that the developers had successfully unionized, with Halldórsdóttir open to work along Unionen to implement new frameworks. In June 2024, Avalanche closed its offices in Montreal and New York, laying off 50 employees.

In September 2025, Avalanche announced they intend to close the Liverpool studio, and the removal of certain roles in other offices.

== Games ==
=== Games developed by Avalanche Studios ===
Year	Title	Platform(s)	Publisher(s)
2006	Just Cause	Windows, PlayStation 2, Xbox, Xbox 360	Eidos Interactive
2009	theHunter	Windows	Emote Games
2010	Just Cause 2	Windows, PlayStation 3, Xbox 360	Square Enix
2011	Renegade Ops	Windows, PlayStation 3, Xbox 360	Sega
2015	theHunter: Primal	Windows	Expansive Worlds, Avalanche Studios
2015	Rumble City	iOS, Android	Avalanche Studios
2015	Mad Max	Windows, macOS, Linux, PlayStation 4, Xbox One	Warner Bros. Interactive Entertainment
2015	Just Cause 3	Windows, PlayStation 4, Xbox One	Square Enix
2018	Just Cause 4	Windows, PlayStation 4, Xbox One	Square Enix
2019	Rage 2	Windows, PlayStation 4, Xbox One	Bethesda Softworks

=== Games developed by Expansive Worlds ===
Year	Title	Platform(s)
2015	theHunter: Primal	Windows
2017	theHunter: Call of the Wild	Windows, PlayStation 4, Xbox One
2022	Call of the Wild: The Angler	Windows, PlayStation 4, Xbox One

=== Games developed by Systemic Reaction ===
Year	Title	Platform(s)
2019	Generation Zero	Windows, PlayStation 4, Xbox One
2020	Second Extinction	Windows, Xbox One, Xbox Series X/S
2023	Ravenbound	Windows

=== Cancelled projects ===
The studio also worked on several cancelled projects. In 2009, Avalanche announced AionGuard, a God of War-style open world fantasy game which features World War I fighters, samurai and knights for the PlayStation 3 and Xbox 360. Influences for the game were drawn from Star Wars and works from Frank Herbert and Michael Moorcock. However, the project was eventually put on hold indefinitely in 2010. In 2012, the company announced a non-Superman comic book game, which was eventually cancelled in 2014. The studio almost collaborated with LucasArts to develop an open world video game based on the Star Wars universe. A steampunk-themed game was also reported to be in development, but was later put on hold. In 2021, the open world co-op game Contraband was announced to be in development at Avalanche and set to be published by Xbox Game Studios, but was later cancelled in August 2025.
