= Generation Zero (video game) =

2019 video game

- Developer: Systemic Reaction
- Publisher: Systemic Reaction
- Director: Emil Kraftling
- Engine: APEX
- Platforms: Microsoft Windows; PlayStation 4; Xbox One
- Release: March 26, 2019
- Genres: First-person shooter, survival
- Modes: Single-player, multiplayer

Generation Zero is a first-person shooter video game developed and self-published by Avalanche Studios, under the brand Systemic Reaction. The game was announced in June 2018 and released on PlayStation 4, PC and Xbox One on March 26, 2019.

== Gameplay ==
Generation Zero is an open-world, co-operative, first-person shooter, survival game that can be played online with up to three other players or solo.

== Plot and setting ==
The game takes place in an alternate 1989 Sweden where violent robots have taken over. The robots range in size from tiny scouting drones to massive robots that tower over the houses. The player assumes the role of a Swedish teenager who returns from an island excursion to find that the local populace has disappeared as a result of the robotic invasion. While striving to survive in the Swedish wilderness, the player must figure out a means to beat the machines and learn what happened to people who lived there.

The artistic style of the game has frequently been likened to the artwork of Simon Stålenhag, including by the artist himself. However, despite perceived similarities, Avalanche Studios has denied that the style of the game has been inspired or motivated by Stålenhag's art and that the artist was involved directly or indirectly in the making of the game.

== Reception ==
Reception

Aggregate score
Aggregator	Score		
Aggregator	PC	PS4	Xbox One
Metacritic	51/100	45/100	50/100

Review scores
Publication	Score		
Publication	PC	PS4	Xbox One
Destructoid	2.5/10	N/A	N/A
Game Informer	N/A	5/10	N/A
IGN	4/10	N/A	N/A
PC Gamer (US)	67/100	N/A	N/A
Push Square	N/A	3/10	N/A

According to review aggregator Metacritic, Generation Zero has received "generally unfavorable reviews" for the PlayStation 4 version of the game and "mixed or average reviews" for the Windows and Xbox One versions.
