= Tim Allsop & Stewart Williams =

British filmmaking duo

Tim Allsop and Stewart Williams
- Occupations: Producers; writers; directors
- Years active: 2006–present

Tim Allsop and Stewart Williams are a British filmmaking duo.

They met in 2005 working for Elisabeth Murdoch’s production company Shine Limited. Their first joint work was a Comedy Lab for Channel 4 starring Alex Zane which they wrote, produced, and directed. Since then they have written for a variety of comedy and entertainment shows for the BBC, ITV and Channel 4, as well directing music videos and commercials – most recently for the Guitar Hero brand. In 2007 they began working on a pilot for Plus One in the Comedy Showcase strand for Channel 4 which they made with production company Kudos.

They have previously written for the Cartoon Network animated series The Amazing World of Gumball, as well as developing the show bible and writing for the Disney EMEA series Space Chickens in Space.

From 2015 to 2022, Allsop served as Head of Comedy and Entertainment for Spelthorne Community Television and was a producer on the Showtime television series Who Is America. Williams wrote an episode for the BBC series Famalam in 2020.
