= 2018 in video games =

Numerous video games were released in 2018. Best-selling games included Madden NFL 19, NBA 2K19, NBA Live 19, WWE 2K19, Call of Duty: Black Ops 4, Marvel's Spider-Man, Red Dead Redemption 2, Super Smash Bros. Ultimate, Far Cry 5, God of War, Monster Hunter: World, Assassin's Creed Odyssey, Spyro Reignited Trilogy, and Dragon Ball FighterZ. Games highly regarded by video game critics released in 2018 included Red Dead Redemption 2, God of War, Super Smash Bros. Ultimate, Marvel's Spider-Man, Forza Horizon 4, Monster Hunter: World, Dead Cells, Return of the Obra Dinn, and Celeste. The year's highest-grossing games included Fortnite, Honor of Kings/Arena of Valor, Dungeon Fighter Online, League of Legends, and Pokémon Go.

Among major trends in 2018 included the explosive growth of battle royale games such as Bluehole's PlayerUnknown's Battlegrounds and Epic Games' Fortnite Battle Royale, the resurgence of Pokémon Go, ongoing governmental review of loot boxes in light of national gambling restrictions, Sony Interactive Entertainment agreeing to allow cross-platform play between PlayStation 4 and other console users, and the entry of Fortnite-related internet memes into popular culture. With Fortnite's success, Epic was able to establish the Epic Games Store for personal computers as a strong competitor to the dominant but criticized position held by Valve's Steam digital storefront by significantly increasing the revenue split it gave to developers. Additionally, with a number of major sudden studio closures, including Telltale Games, there was an increasing call for video game developers to unionize. A nearly year-long freeze on video game approvals by the Chinese government had a major impact on publishers Tencent and NetEase, and was anticipated to impact future revenues in the industry.

Series with new installments in 2018 include Anno, Assassin's Creed, Battlefield, Bloons Tower Defense, Bayonetta, Bit.Trip, BlazBlue, Bomberman, Call of Duty, Darksiders, Digimon, Donkey Kong, Dragon Ball, Dynasty Warriors, Earth Defense Force, Fallout, Far Cry, Forza, God of War, Hitman, Just Cause, Kirby, Life Is Strange, Mario Party, Mario Tennis, Mega Man, Monster Hunter, Ni no Kuni, Persona, Pillars of Eternity, Pokémon, Red Dead, Sakura Wars, Science Adventure, Shantae, Soulcalibur, Spider-Man, Spyro, State of Decay, Super Smash Bros., The Bard's Tale, The Crew, The Walking Dead, Tomb Raider, Tropico, Valkyria Chronicles, WarioWare, Warhammer, Wolfenstein, and Yakuza.

In addition, 2018 saw the introduction of several new properties, including Among Us, Astro Bot Rescue Mission, A Way Out, Baldi's Basics in Education and Learning, Celeste, Dead Cells, Deltarune, Detroit: Become Human, Firewall, Frostpunk, InnerSpace, Just Shapes & Beats, Marvel's Spider-Man, Moss, Octopath Traveler, Overload, Paladins: Champions of the Realm, Past Cure, The Persistence, Rust, Sea of Thieves, Subnautica, and Vampyr.

== Financial performance ==
According to industry analysis firm NewZoo, the video game industry was worth $134.9 billion by revenues in 2018, a 10.9% growth over 2017. Of this, 47% of the revenues were generated from mobile gaming, with consoles taking 28% and personal computers taking the remaining 25%. The top five largest video game markets of 2018 were China ($34.4 billion), the United States ($31.5 billion), Japan ($17.7 billion), South Korea ($5.8 billion), and Germany ($5 billion).

According to the NPD Group, total revenue from the video game industry, including hardware, software, and accessories, in the United States grew by 17% to US$43.4 billion, nearly matching revenues for the American film industry for 2018. Of that, US$35.8 billion were from software sales, digital content, and subscriptions. Hardware sales, at US$7.5 billion, were up 15% from 2017, as despite the fact that there was no new hardware releases, several system-exclusive titles helped to drive hardware sales.

Licensed merchandise based on video game franchises generated $20.68 billion in 2018 retail sales, a rise of 6.1% compared to 2017.

=== Highest-grossing games ===
The following were 2018's top ten highest-grossing video games in terms of worldwide digital revenue (including digital purchases, microtransactions, free-to-play and pay-to-play) across all platforms (including mobile, PC and console platforms). Six of the top ten highest-grossing games are published or owned by Tencent, including the top five titles.

Rank	Game	Revenue	Publisher(s)	Genre	Business model	Ref.
1	Fortnite	$5,477,000,000	Epic Games (Tencent)	Battle royale, Survival	Free-to-play	
2	Honor of Kings / Arena of Valor	$2,510,000,000	Tencent	MOBA	Free-to-play	
3	League of Legends	$1,900,000,000	Riot Games / Tencent	MOBA	Free-to-play	
4	Dungeon Fighter Online	$1,700,000,000	Nexon / Tencent	Beat 'em up	Free-to-play	
5	Crossfire	$1,453,000,000	Smilegate / Tencent	FPS	Free-to-play	
6	Monster Strike	$1,387,419,755	Mixi	Physics	Free-to-play	
7	Pokémon Go	$1,300,000,000	Niantic / Nintendo / The Pokémon Company	AR	Free-to-play	
8	PlayerUnknown's Battlegrounds (PUBG)	$1,224,800,000	Bluehole / Tencent	Battle royale	Buy-to-play / free-to-play	(Note: PlayerUnknown's Battlegrounds (PUBG): PC and consoles (buy-to-play) – $1.025 billion; PUBG Mobile (free-to-play) – $196.8 million)
9	Fate/Grand Order	$1,200,000,000	Aniplex (Sony Music Entertainment Japan)	RPG	Free-to-play	
10	Candy Crush Saga	$1,100,000,000	King (Activision Blizzard)	Puzzle	Free-to-play	

The video game franchise that has generated the highest licensed merchandise sales is Pokémon. Other video game franchises with significant licensed merchandise sales include Sonic the Hedgehog, Mario, Call of Duty, Overwatch, Roblox, Halo, Fortnite and Minecraft.

=== Best-selling games by region ===
The following were 2018's top ten best-selling video games by region, in terms of software units sold (excluding microtransactions and free-to-play titles) on PC and console platforms, for the United States, Japan, and Europe.

Rank	Europe	Japan (Note: Not including PC sales)	United States
1	FIFA 19	Monster Hunter: World	Red Dead Redemption 2
2	Red Dead Redemption 2	Super Smash Bros. Ultimate	Call of Duty: Black Ops 4
3	Spider-Man	Pokémon: Let's Go	NBA 2K19
4	Call of Duty: Black Ops 4	Splatoon 2	Madden NFL 19
5	Mario Kart 8 Deluxe	Mario Kart 8 Deluxe	Super Smash Bros. Ultimate (Note: Not including digital sales)
6	God of War	Super Mario Party	Spider-Man
7	Far Cry 5	Kirby Star Allies	Far Cry 5
8	Super Smash Bros. Ultimate	Minecraft: Nintendo Switch Edition	God of War
9	Super Mario Party	Call of Duty: Black Ops 4	Monster Hunter: World
10	Super Mario Odyssey	Super Mario Odyssey	Assassin's Creed: Odyssey

== Top-rated games ==
=== Critically acclaimed games ===
Metacritic is an aggregator of video game journalism reviews. It generally considers expansions and re-releases as separate entities.

Releases scoring higher than 90/100 in 2018
Title	Publisher(s)	Release	Platform(s)	MC score
Red Dead Redemption 2	Rockstar Games	October 26, 2018	PS4, XBO	97
God of War	Sony Interactive Entertainment	April 20, 2018	PS4	94
Celeste	Maddy Makes Games	January 26, 2018	XBO	94
Undertale	8-4	September 18, 2018	NS	93
Super Smash Bros. Ultimate	Nintendo	December 7, 2018	NS	93
Forza Horizon 4	Xbox Game Studios	October 2, 2018	XBO	92
Divinity: Original Sin II - Definitive Edition	Larian Studios	August 31, 2018	PS4, XBO	92
Celeste	Maddy Makes Games	January 25, 2018	NS	92
Bayonetta 2	Nintendo	February 16, 2018	NS	92
Inside	Playdead	June 28, 2018	NS	91
Sonic Mania Plus	Sega	July 17, 2018	NS	91
Dead Cells	Motion Twin	August 7, 2018	XBO	91
Shadow of the Colossus	Sony Interactive Entertainment	February 6, 2018	PS4	91
Celeste	Maddy Makes Games	January 25, 2018	PS4	91
Nier: Automata Become As Gods Edition	Square Enix	June 26, 2018	XBO	90
Bastion	Supergiant Games	September 13, 2018	NS	90
Monster Hunter: World	Capcom	January 26, 2018	PS4, XBO	90
Hollow Knight	Team Cherry	June 12, 2018	NS	90
Into the Breach	Subset Games	February 27, 2018	WIN	90
Astro Bot Rescue Mission	Sony Interactive Entertainment	October 2, 2018	PS4	90
Bayonetta + Bayonetta 2	Nintendo	February 16, 2018	NS	90

=== Major awards ===
Category/Organization		36th Golden Joystick Awards November 16, 2018	The Game Awards 2018 December 6, 2018	22nd Annual D.I.C.E. Awards February 13, 2019	19th Annual Game Developers Choice Awards March 20, 2019	15th British Academy Games Awards April 4, 2019
Game of the Year		Fortnite: Battle Royale	God of War			
Independent / Debut (Note: Certain award presentations combine these categories.)	Indie	Dead Cells	Celeste	Celeste	Florence	Yoku's Island Express
Independent / Debut	Debut	Dead Cells	The Messenger	Celeste	Florence	Yoku's Island Express
Mobile/Portable		PUBG Mobile	Florence			
VR/AR		The Elder Scrolls V: Skyrim VR	Astro Bot Rescue Mission	Beat Saber		—N/a
Innovation		—N/a			Nintendo Labo	
Artistic Achievement	Animation	God of War	Return of the Obra Dinn	Marvel's Spider-Man	Gris	Return of the Obra Dinn
Artistic Achievement	Art Direction	God of War	Return of the Obra Dinn	God of War	Gris	Return of the Obra Dinn
Audio	Music	God of War	Red Dead Redemption 2	God of War	Celeste	God of War
Audio	Sound Design	God of War	Red Dead Redemption 2	God of War	Celeste	God of War
Character or Performance		Bryan Dechart as Connor; Detroit: Become Human	Roger Clark as Arthur Morgan; Red Dead Redemption 2	Kratos; God of War	—N/a	Jeremy Davies as Baldur; God of War
Game Design or Direction	Game Design	—N/a	God of War	God of War	Into the Breach	Return of the Obra Dinn
Game Design or Direction	Game Direction	—N/a	God of War	God of War	Into the Breach	Return of the Obra Dinn
Narrative		God of War	Red Dead Redemption 2	God of War	Return of the Obra Dinn	God of War
Technical Achievement		—N/a		Red Dead Redemption 2		—N/a
Multiplayer/Online	Competitive	Fortnite Battle Royale	Fortnite		—N/a	A Way Out
Multiplayer/Online	Cooperative	Monster Hunter: World	Fortnite		—N/a	A Way Out
Action		—N/a	Dead Cells	Celeste	—N/a	
Adventure		—N/a	God of War		—N/a	
Family		—N/a	Overcooked 2	Unravel Two	—N/a	Nintendo Labo
Fighting		—N/a	Dragon Ball FighterZ	Super Smash Bros. Ultimate	—N/a	
Role-Playing		—N/a	Monster Hunter: World		—N/a	
Sports/Racing	Sports	—N/a	Forza Horizon 4	Mario Tennis Aces	—N/a	
Sports/Racing	Racing	—N/a	Forza Horizon 4	Forza Horizon 4	—N/a	
Strategy/Simulation		—N/a	Into the Breach		—N/a	
Social Impact		—N/a	Celeste	—N/a		My Child Lebensborn
Special Award		Lifetime Achievement	Industry Icon Award	Hall of Fame	Lifetime Achievement Award	BAFTA Special Award
Special Award		Hidetaka Miyazaki	Greg Thomas	Bonnie Ross	Amy Hennig	Epic Games

== Major events ==
Date	Event	Ref.
January 4	Video game peripheral maker Mad Catz was re-established.	
January 7–12	The 2018 Consumer Electronics Show (CES) was held in Las Vegas, Nevada.	
January 8	Rebellion Developments acquired Radiant Worlds and rebranded the studio as Rebellion Warwick.	
January 10	The inaugural season of the Overwatch League began.	
January 22	Yuji Naka announced that he joined Square Enix.	
February 14	THQ Nordic acquired Koch Media.	
February 20–22	Academy of Interactive Arts & Sciences hosted the 2018 D.I.C.E. Summit and 21st Annual D.I.C.E. Awards at the Mandalay Bay Convention Center in Las Vegas, Nevada. Genyo Takeda received the Lifetime Achievement Award.	
March 9–18	The 2018 South by Southwest Festival was held in Austin, Texas.	
March 19–23	The 2018 Game Developers Conference was held in San Francisco, California.	
March 20	Vivendi formally ended its attempt to acquire Ubisoft, selling all of its 30 million shares of Ubisoft to other companies, including Tencent.	
April 1	Kaz Hirai stepped down as CEO of Sony Corporation while remaining as chairman of the board, with CFO Kenichiro Yoshida replacing him as CEO.	
April 5–8	PAX East was held in Boston, Massachusetts.	
April 21	Valve acquired developer Campo Santo.	
May 14	Cliff Bleszinski's studio Boss Key Productions closed down.	
May 14	Bigben Interactive acquired Cyanide.	
May 15	2K Games developer Hangar 13 opened a fourth game development studio in Brighton, England.	
May 16	Polish developer People Can Fly opened a new studio in Rzeszów, Poland.	
June 1	Facebook launched Facebook Gaming as a competitor to Twitch.	
June 10	Microsoft announced its acquisitions of Undead Labs, Playground Games, Compulsion Games, and Ninja Theory and the formation of a new studio named The Initiative in Santa Monica.	
June 12–14	E3 2018 (Electronic Entertainment Expo 2018) was held at the Los Angeles Convention Center.	
July 11	Electronic Arts announced its acquisition of Industrial Toys.	
August 13	Crystal Dynamics opened Crystal NorthWest.	
August 14	Sumo Group Plc acquired The Chinese Room.	
August 20–25	The International 2018, a Dota 2 tournament with the largest prize pool in esports history, was held at the Rogers Arena in Canada.	
August 21–25	Gamescom was held in Cologne, Germany.	
August 26	A mass shooting occurred at a Madden NFL 19 tournament in Jacksonville, Florida, with the shooter, a participant in the tournament who lost, killing two people and injuring ten others before committing suicide.	
September 18	Wargaming opened a UK studio	
September 18	Capcom Vancouver shut down.	
September 18	The Nintendo Switch Online service launches for the Nintendo Switch, which allows subscribers to play games online as well emulated games from the Nintendo Entertainment System.	
September 20–23	The 2018 Tokyo Game Show was held in Tokyo.	
September 20–23	The UK's largest games show, EGX was held at the National Exhibition Centre in Birmingham, England.	
September 21	Telltale Games announced a "majority studio closure", laying off more than 90% of its staff and cancelling several in-progress games.	
September 26	Sony Interactive Entertainment revises its policy on cross-platform play and allows PlayStation 4 players of Fortnite: Battle Royale to matchmake across all supported platforms.	
October 6	Skybound Entertainment acquires the rights and capabilities to finish off Telltale's work-in-progress, The Walking Dead: The Final Season, after Telltale's shutdown.	
November 2–3	The 2018 BlizzCon was held in Anaheim, California.	
November 9	It was announced video game guide creator Prima Games would be shutting down after 28 years in business.	
November 10	Microsoft announced the acquisitions of InXile Entertainment and Obsidian Entertainment.	
December 3	Starbreeze Studios files for financial restructuring after the commercial failure of Overkill's The Walking Dead.	
December 6	The Game Awards 2018 were held in Los Angeles, California.	

== Notable deaths ==
- February 7 – Jill Messick, 50, producer of A Minecraft Movie.
- March 3 – David Ogden Stiers, 75, voice actor best known for the voice of Doctor Jumba Jookiba in the Lilo & Stitch franchise.
- May 24 – TotalBiscuit, 33, English video gaming commentator and game critic on YouTube.
- June 18 – Big Van Vader, 63, pro wrestler (cover star of WCW SuperBrawl Wrestling and WWF In Your House).
- July 4 – Ronnie Edwards, 25, content creator MatPat's The Game Theorists.
- August 23 – McSkillet, 18, Counter-Strike: Global Offensive YouTuber.
- September 6 – Burt Reynolds, 82, voice actor known for the voice of Avery Carrington in Grand Theft Auto: Vice City.
- November 12 – Stan Lee, 95, comic book writer, editor, publisher, and producer for Marvel Comics. Numerous of his characters have appeared in video games.
- November 26 – Stephen Hillenburg, 57, animator and creator of SpongeBob SquarePants which had numerous video games.

== Hardware releases ==
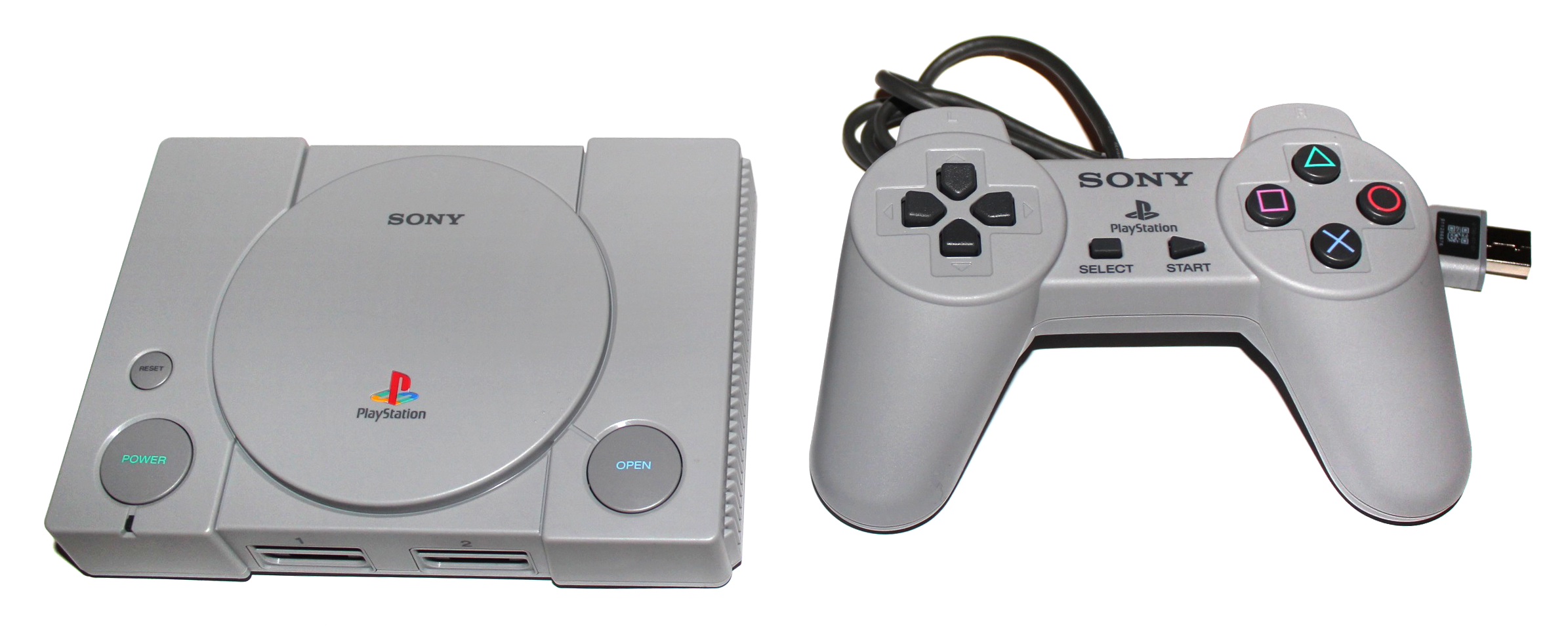
PlayStation Classic

Date	Console	Manufacturer	Ref.
May 1	Oculus Go	Oculus VR	
May	GPD Win 2	GamePad Digital	
July 20	Phoenix One		
July 24	NEOGEO mini	SNK	
October 9	THEC64Mini	Retro Games	
October 24	Atari Flashback 9	AtGames	
November 15	Atari Flashback 9 Gold	AtGames	
November 30	Go! Retro Portable		
December 3	PlayStation Classic	Sony	

== Video game-based film and television releases ==
Title	Date	Type	Distributor(s)	Franchise	Original game publisher(s)	Ref.
E-League Australia	January, 2018	Esports television series	Fox Sports	—N/a	—N/a	
Tomb Raider	March 16, 2018	Feature film	Warner Bros. Pictures	Tomb Raider	Square Enix	
Ready Player One	March 29, 2018	Feature film	Warner Bros. Pictures	Ready Player One	—N/a	
Persona 5: The Animation	April 7, 2018	Anime television series	Aniplex	Persona	Atlus	
Caligula	April 8, 2018	Anime television series	Tokyo MX (Japan)	The Caligula Effect	FuRyu	
Rampage	April 13, 2018	Feature film	Warner Bros. Pictures	Rampage	Midway Games	
Subway Surfers: The Animated Series	June 1, 2018	Animated series	SYBO (via YouTube)	Subway Surfers	SYBO	
Hi Score Girl	July 13, 2018 (Note: The series debuted on Netflix as a "Netflix Original" in December 2018.)	Anime television series	Tokyo MX (Japan); Netflix (international)	—N/a	—N/a	
Pokémon the Movie: The Power of Us	July 13, 2018	Anime film	Toho (Japan)	Pokémon	Nintendo; The Pokémon Company	
Uncharted Live Action Fan Film	July 16, 2018	Independent film	—N/a	Uncharted	Naughty Dog	
Mega Man: Fully Charged	August 5, 2018	Animated series	Cartoon Network	Mega Man	Capcom	
Noobees	September 17, 2018	Television series	Nickelodeon	—N/a	—N/a	
Legend of the Ancient Sword	October 1, 2018	Feature film	Alibaba Pictures	GuJian2	Gamebar	
Ingress: The Animation	October 17, 2018	Anime television series	Fuji TV (Japan); Netflix (international)	Ingress	Niantic	
Million Arthur	October 25, 2018	Anime television series	Tokyo MX (Japan)	Million Arthur	Square Enix	
Ralph Breaks the Internet	November 21, 2018	Animated film	Walt Disney Studios Motion Pictures	Wreck-It Ralph	—N/a	
Yo-kai Watch: Forever Friends	December 14, 2018	Anime film	Toho	Yo-kai Watch	Level-5	

== See also ==
- 2018 in esports
- 2018 in games
