= GuJian =

2010 video game

- Developer: Aurogon
- Publishers: Gamebar; Typhoon Games; Interwise
- Designer: Shao Yun
- Artist: Zheng Wen
- Writer: Shao Yun
- Composers: Lo Chi-Yi; Zhou Zhihua
- Series: Gujian
- Engine: Gamebryo
- Platforms: Microsoft Windows, Xbox One
- Release: Microsoft Windows: PRC: July 10, 2010; TW: January 31, 2011; HK: February 24, 2011; Xbox One; Canceled
- Genre: Turn-based role-playing
- Mode: Single-player

GuJian (simplified Chinese: 古剑奇谭: 琴心剑魄今何在; traditional Chinese: 古劍奇譚: 琴心劍魄今何在; pinyin: Gǔjiàn Qítán: Qínxīn Jiànpò Jīn Hézài; lit. 'Old Sword Legend: Where Is the Heart of the Qin and the Soul of the Sword?') is a role-playing video game developed by Aurogon with the Gamebryo engine and published by Gamebar. The first installment of the Gujian series, it was originally released in China on July 10, 2010 for Microsoft Windows. An Xbox One port of the game was announced in 2014.

Set in a fictionalized version of ancient China, players control Baili Tusu, a young swordsman with a tragic background. Elements of traditional Chinese culture, including mythology, cuisine, fashion, architecture and Taoism, were prominent; the main characters' names are derived from names of alcoholic beverages in ancient China. The game's monsters were inspired by Chinese mythology, and many of the in-game locations are based on photographs and descriptions of historic sites.

GuJian is the first Chinese video game with fully voiced main characters. The combat is turn-based, occasionally including quick time events. It received generally positive reviews, and was updated by Aurogon with downloadable content.

The first sequel, GuJian 2, was released in August 2013. The third game in the series, GuJian 3, was released on December 14, 2018.

== Gameplay ==
Players control the main characters during their journey across ancient China. The game has a main story missions and side quests, which tell stories about non-player characters. Combat is turn-based, and each action has a number of action points, from one to five.

Players can collect food from monsters and buy recipes from shopkeepers. The prepared dishes and their leftovers can be used for recovery or attack.

=== Downloadable content ===
Since August 11, 2011, Aurogon has released seven items of downloadable content, including costumes, weapons, sub-quests and stories.

== Synopsis ==
=== Plot ===
The game begins with a young Han Yunxi, son and sole successor to a female village shaman, sneaking out of the village to play. His plan to take his best friend, Chu Chan, to see a rare golden fox is disrupted when they are attacked by a bear, causing Chu Chan to stop playing with him. Under his mother's orders, Yunxi enters the Cave of Ice and Fire to perform a village ritual. Inside the cave, he sees the Sword of Fenji within a magical seal. He finally emerges from the cave, only to witness a group of outsiders massacre his village. He passes out in shock, and wakes up in the cave beside his mother's dead body.

Several years later, a 17-year-old Yunxi, now called Baili Tusu, has become the second disciple of Master Ziyin from the Tianyong sect that resides in the Kunlun Mountains. Tusu carries with him the Sword of Fenji, which has been released from the seal after the massacre. Vicious spirits residing within the sword torment him from time to time. Tusu leaves the mountains for the outside world to answer to the desperate pleas of a group of men kidnapped by bandits. He rescues Fang Lansheng, a young, talkative scholar, Ouyang Shaogong, a gentle, mild-mannered alchemy expert, and Ji Tong, Shaogong's elderly servant. Shaogong tells Tusu that he is trying to retrieve the stolen treasure of the Qingyutan sect: a special jade which can be used to create a potion to revive the dead. The jade has been broken into pieces, and are being used to absorb human souls. Hoping to revive his mother, Tusu proposes to help Shaogong find the fragments, in exchange for Shaogong to brew him the potion of resurrection. Tusu also vaguely recognises the jade, and is convinced that it will lead him to the true culprit behind the massacre.

Tusu leaves the bandit camp for the town of Qinchuan. He passes by a mountain stream and runs into Feng Qingxue, who happens to be bathing in the stream. Taking him to be a voyeur, she immobilises him and takes away his Sword of Fenji as punishment. Tusu chases after Qingxue, but the evil spirits in the sword haunt him again when he finally catches up to her in Qinchuan, causing him to lose his mind. Tusu regains his consciousness to discover that he is on Shaogong's ship. By passing some of her chi to him, Qingxue was able to relieve him of his pain, something he thought was impossible.

Qingxue, in search of her missing elder brother, joins Tusu and Shaogong in the search for the jade fragments. On the ship, they meet Xiang Ling, a half-fox who was also saved when Tusu cleared the bandit camp. Lansheng attempts to escape from an arranged marriage, meeting a lady named Hong Yu. The three of them join Tusu's party.

=== Characters ===
- Han Yunxi (韩云溪), also called Baili Tusu (百里屠苏), voiced by Chen Guang: The game's 17-year-old protagonist, whose village was massacred when he was eight. His most trustworthy companion is a white gyrfalcon he calls Xiang (阿翔). Tusu constantly feeds it pork to prevent it from going on a hunt and possibly injuring civilians. This has unintentionally made the fierce predator resemble an overweight chicken. While normally cold and stoic, he also has a warm and childish side. "Tusu" is an alcoholic drink often consumed on the eve of the Lunar New Year to ward off evil spirits. He gives himself this name after the massacre as he wishes to protect everything he holds dear.
- Feng Qingxue (风晴雪), voiced by Shen Qiuxiang: A kind, outgoing and innocent girl of 17 with a sweet smile. Her family lives in the underground world, and serves the goddess Nüwa. At some point in time after the massacre of Tusu's village, she left the underground world in search of her missing brother. She is born with poison in her body, and always wears gloves to prevent direct contact with others. Her unbridled curiosity and a fear of loneliness compels her to explore the world and reach out to others.
- Ouyang Shaogong (欧阳少恭), voiced by Peng Yao: 25 years old, he is from Qinchuan and a childhood friend of Fang Lansheng. Owing to his unrivalled expertise in alchemy, he has attained a prestigious elder status within the Qingyutan sect at a very young age. His weapon is an antique guqin.
- Fang Lansheng (方兰生), voiced by Hui Long: an 18-years-old scholar at the Qinchuan school. He comes from an affluent family with five sisters. He leaves with Tusu to avoid an arranged marriage and falls in love with Xiang Ling. When in battle, he uses prayer beads to cast buddhist incantations that he learnt from his father, the head monk at a temple near Qinchuan. "Lansheng" was a royal alcoholic drink made from the petals of a hundred different flowers, showing that he grew up shielded by his elder sisters. "Lan" stands for "orchid", which symbolises a gentleman in Chinese culture. This reflects the high hopes his parents have for him.
- Xiang Ling (襄铃), voiced by Yan Mengmeng: A 16 years old half-fox, half-human girl. Ling was raised by Grandfather Banyan, a banyan spirit, after her parents abandoned her. A cute and lively child at heart, she loves romance and dreams of meeting her prince charming. "Xiang Ling" is a type of baijiu with a sweet and refreshing taste, which brings to mind her purity. She uses an ornate Chinese hand fan to cast spells and buffs.
- Yin Qianshang (尹千觞), voiced by Lu Kui: A 27-year-old broadsword fighter who enjoys gambling and drinking; Feng Qingxue says he looks like her older brother, who disappeared a long time ago.
- Hong Yu (红玉), voiced by Xu Xiaoqing: A beautiful and mysterious 25-year-old lady who is rather experienced for her age. She wields dual swords.
- Ziyin (紫胤), a legendary and mysterious elder in the Tianyongcheng sect who has reached immortal status. He has an enormous collection of swords, many of which are crafted by himself.

== Audio ==
=== Voice acting ===
The dubbing group Jingcheng Zhi Sheng voiced the game.

=== Music ===
GuJian's score was composed by Lo Chi-Yi and Zhou Zhihua of the Musit Music Studio, and its 101-track CD was released on March 18, 2011. Aurogon and Gamebar released "Gu Jian Qing Yun" from the Xiaoxu Music Studio, sung by Dong Zhen, during the summer of 2011 with the game's second ending.

== Reception ==
GuJian received generally favourable reviews from players and the media. Reviewers praised the story, character setting and graphics. PCGames calls it "basically the best that local single-player games have to offer" at its time. POPSOFT gave the game a score of 8.5/10, lauding it for the story and graphics, but noted that "it takes a while to fully immerse oneself into the game".

== Legacy ==
A novel adaptation was published in August 2012.

In 2014, the game was adapted into a critically acclaimed television series, Swords of Legends, starring Li Yifeng and Yang Mi.

== See also ==
- The Legend of Sword and Fairy
- Xuan-Yuan Sword
