= Rico Rodriguez =

Rico Rodriguez is the name of:

- Rico Rodriguez (musician) (1934–2015), Cuban born Jamaican trombonist
- Rico Rodriguez (actor) (born 1998), American actor
- Rico Rodriguez, the protagonist of Just Cause video games

== See also ==
- Ricco Rodriguez (born 1977), American martial artist
