= Just Cause 3 =

2015 action-adventure game

- Developer: Avalanche Studios
- Publisher: Square Enix Europe
- Director: Roland Lesterlin
- Producers: Adam Davidson; Bill Podurgiel
- Designer: Francesco Antolini
- Programmer: Andrew Yount
- Artist: Zach Schläppi
- Writers: Nathaniel Bryan; Patrick Downs; Katie Elwood; Benjamin Jaekle; Joe Laurino; Roland Lesterlin; Greg Orlando; Omar Shakir; Mike Varley
- Composer: Henry Jackman
- Series: Just Cause
- Engine: Apex
- Platforms: Microsoft Windows; PlayStation 4; Xbox One
- Release: 1 December 2015
- Genre: Action-adventure
- Mode: Single-player

Just Cause 3 is a 2015 action-adventure game developed by Avalanche Studios and published by Square Enix's European subsidiary. It is the third game in the Just Cause series and the sequel to 2010's Just Cause 2. It was released worldwide in December 2015, for Microsoft Windows, PlayStation 4, and Xbox One.

Additionally, the game can be purchased from the Xbox and PlayStation digital stores and played on Xbox Series and PlayStation 5 consoles.

Set six years after its predecessor, Just Cause 3 follows series protagonist Rico Rodriguez as he returns to his homeland of Medici, a fictional Mediterranean island country under the control of dictator General Sebastiano Di Ravello. The game is played from a third-person perspective and allows players to explore the island of Medici in an open world environment.

Just Cause 3 received generally positive reviews. Critics praised its open-ended gameplay, destruction mechanics, and emphasis on player agency. Criticism was directed both at its narrative, which some considered clichéd and uninspired, and also its performance issues, particularly on the console versions of the game.

A sequel, Just Cause 4, was released in 2018.

== Gameplay ==
A screenshot of an ongoing liberation of a town

Just Cause 3 is an action-adventure game with a third-person perspective. It is set in an open world environment on the fictional Mediterranean island nation of Medici. The world size is 400 square miles (1,000 km^{2}), similar to that of the setting of Just Cause 2. However, its volumetric terrain has increased to allow more verticality—as a result of this, it is possible for the player to explore caverns and scale buildings more effectively and realistically. The game's world is composed of five major biomes, with each having unique landmarks and landscapes.

A variety of tools are provided to players for traversing the game's environments. Just Cause 2's signature features—the grappling hook and parachute—re-appear with improved mechanics. The focus on chaos and exaggerated physics also remain. A new wingsuit, which is permanently equipped by protagonist Rico Rodríguez, is featured in the game and allows the player to glide across the world more quickly. When the player reaches the ground while using the wingsuit, they can use the grappling hook and parachute to draw themselves upward again. Players can switch between using the parachute and wingsuit freely. In addition to the equipment provided, a wide range of weapons, like assault rifles, missile launchers, shotguns, RPGs, and vehicles, such as fighter aircraft, planes, ships, and exotic cars, are included in the game. These vehicles can be used as weapons.

Other game mechanics have been overhauled and updated. For example, players can tether multiple objects together with the grappling hook and can increase the amount of available tethers by activating in-game 'mods', which are earned by completing challenges. Parachuting is also more stable and allows players to shoot enemies from the air. The player can grapple nearly every object and non-playable character in the game with the grappling hook. In-game currency has been left out of Just Cause 3, making supply drops more easily accessible. However, this affects the game's difficulty; for example, if the player chooses to ride a tank, the enemy AI matches the power of it and adopts weapons that are able to take down a tank. Another new feature is giving the character an infinite amount of "GE-64", a Bavarium-based planted explosive similar to C4. Players can deploy three units of GE-64 at a time, and up to five with the in-game 'mods'. In Just Cause 2, players were able to stand on top of moving vehicles but only in the center; in Just Cause 3, players are allowed to move around freely on vehicles. Players are expected to liberate hostile military bases and towns featured in the game, which thereafter can be used as fast travel locations.

Creativity and destruction are heavily emphasized in Just Cause 3. Many objects in the game, including structures like bridges and statues, can be destroyed in a variety of different ways. A new mechanic called Rebel Drop allows the player to pause the game to select equipment, weapons, and vehicles. The selected objects are then dropped in a supply cache. The game also features Challenge Modes. It includes mini-games like wingsuit races and the destruction frenzy mode, in which new objectives and challenges are unlocked when the player destroys an enemy base.

Despite the multiplayer mod of Just Cause 2 being well received by players, the game only featured asynchronous multiplayer, in which challenges and leaderboards were included instead of any cooperative or competitive multiplayer mode, as the studio wanted to focus their manpower, time and resources in creating the game's world.

== Plot ==
Six years after the events of Just Cause 2, mercenary Rico Rodriguez returns to his homeland of Medici, a fictional Mediterranean island country that has fallen under the control of a military dictatorship led by General Sebastiano Di Ravello. Seeking to restore freedom to his people, Rico sets out to overthrow Di Ravello and his regime, alongside an underground resistance movement led by his oldest friend, Mario Frigo.

After saving Mario from almost certain death, it quickly becomes apparent to Rico that the Rebellion is on the verge of collapse. As Rico begins to help the Rebellion onto its feet, he reunites with another old ally from his past, Dimah al-Masri. With Rico's help, the rebels retake the former Medician capital of Manaea and destroy the Vis Electra power plant, a symbol of Di Ravello's power. In response, troops are sent to destroy the coastal town of Costa del Porto as retribution. Dimah and her team inform Rico and Mario that Di Ravello has been mining Bavarium, a valuable mineral found only on Medici, so that he can use it to build the most powerful arsenal the world has ever seen.

While retrieving an experimental scanner for Dimah, Rico discovers his former Agency contact, Tom Sheldon, is also working with the rebellion. In the process, the scanner is heavily damaged; Rico delivers it to Sheldon, although not trusting him to have the rebels' interests in mind. Mario assigns Rico to rescue Zeno Antithikara, a Bavarium researcher seeking to defect from the regime. In response, Di Ravello has one of his new Bavarium missiles fired directly into the heart of rebel territory, the province of Baia. At the last second, Rico is able to manually maneuver the missile off its course and crash it into Di Ravello's command base at Cima Leon. The rebels hold a celebration, during which Rico arrives with wine stolen from Di Ravello's estate.

Some time later, the regime sends a small fleet to kill Mario and Dimah while they are out at sea. In the process of saving them, Rico meets Annika and Teo, two smugglers waging their own war on Di Ravello. After Mario is critically wounded during the fight, Annika offers medical aid to Mario in exchange for Rico's help in stealing Di Ravello's Imperators, tanks equipped with protective shields powered by Bavarium. In addition to destroying a number of the tanks, Rico also helps the smugglers destroy the regime's Bavarium refineries and mines, as well as test out an experimental EMP device created using technology from the Imperators. However, the rebels begin to suffer a series of defeats on the battlefield, which Rico attributes to a double agent in their ranks. In a push to wipe out the rebellion, Di Ravello orders a full-scale attack on Mario's coastal hideout. Rico rallies the rebels to defeat the invasion forces, reducing Di Ravello's control to only one region of Medici after igniting an unstable reactor at another command base at Corda Dracon.

Rosa Manuela, a Medician politician and old rival of Di Ravello's, returns to Medici from political exile to form a government opposed to his regime. At the same time, Zeno is identified as the aforementioned double agent. With help from the smugglers, Rico destroys a train carrying Bavarium for export and frees the prisoners working in Di Ravello's last remaining mines. With Sheldon and Dimah, he also prevents Di Ravello from selling a Bavarium bomb by forcing it out of its transport plane and detonating it in the sea. Afterwards, Di Ravello orders the military to attack the rebel-held part of the wall as a diversion to break Zeno out of jail. Zeno attempts to escape by helicopter, but Rico manages to kill him.

The rebels make a final push to end Di Ravello's rule by attacking his central command at Falco Maxime, during which Dimah sacrifices herself to wipe out all known information about Bavarium. With his forces in disarray, Di Ravello confronts Rico in an active volcano, piloting his personal helicopter. After destroying the chopper, the player is given the choice to shoot Di Ravello dead as he laments his failures and regrets. If the player chooses not to, Di Ravello will commit suicide by throwing himself into a lava pit. Rosa forms a new Republic of Medici, assuming the office of President.

== Development ==
The development of Just Cause 3 began in 2012, and was handled by Avalanche Studios' satellite studio in New York, which has around 75 staff members, while the main studio in Sweden focused on the development of Mad Max, which was announced in 2013. The game's controls received an overhaul, and several members from Criterion Games, the developer of the racing video game series Burnout, joined the studios and worked on the vehicle handling of the game. Inspiration for the game's asynchronous multiplayer was taken from racing games like Need for Speed and Forza Horizon 2, while the "Destruction Frenzy" mechanic was inspired by the Red Faction series. Inspirations for the game were drawn from the modding community of Just Cause 2. As a result, the upgrades featured in the game are called "mods".

When designing the game's world, the studio collected photo books of the Mediterranean area and sent a team to several Mediterranean islands to get a better glimpse of the area. The environment of the game is inspired by the landscape of Monaco and the southern Mediterranean area. Avalanche Studios considered such areas "an untapped resource" which no other developer had worked on before. In order to portray a world under dictatorship, the developers of the game established a color scheme composed of mainly grey, yellow, and red, to convey a sense of oppression. The size of the game's world is similar to that of Just Cause 2, but Avalanche promised that the content featured in the world would be "denser" than its predecessor. Environmental destruction is expanded in Just Cause 3, as Avalanche considered it a key element in creating a cinematic experience and a mechanic to give players more freedom. The team also considered that with the advancements in technologies, they were able to add more destruction mechanics, which are of larger scale, to the game.

In an interview, the CEO of Avalanche Studios Christofer Sundberg stated that the game would continue to retain and expand Just Cause 2's joy and humor, and that the tone of the game would not be very serious, but slightly more so than that of Just Cause 2. He described the tone of the game "70 percent wacky and 30 percent serious". The game's campaign explores the series' protagonist Rico Rodriguez's backstory, as the game is set in his motherland. His image was made more "approachable", in which he wears casual clothing like jeans throughout the game, as opposed to his uniform in the original Just Cause and Just Cause 2. His gadgets and equipment were also made more realistic. The art director of the game explained that the studios "[wanted] just a touch of that James Bond agency feel [on Rico Rodriguez] without going too far into the goofy and outlandish like XXX starring Vin Diesel."

The game was first hinted at by the CEO of Avalanche Studios on 27 February 2013. In August 2014, Avalanche Studios announced that 2015 would be their "biggest year since the inception of the studio", teasing "several surprises". The game was rumored to feature a free-to-play structure and microtransactions. However, the developer denied such rumors and confirmed that it would be a full-price game without microtransactions. The game was officially announced on 11 November 2014. The first gameplay demo for the game was shown at Square Enix's E3 2015 conference.

== Release ==
Just Cause 3 was released worldwide on 1 December 2015, for PlayStation 4, Windows, and Xbox One. The game was published by Square Enix. A Collector's Edition of the game was announced on 12 March 2015. People were allowed to vote for the items included in the Edition. The result of the poll was revealed on 9 July 2015, and the Collector's Edition includes a grappling hook, the Weaponized Vehicle Pack content, a poster of Medici and an artbook. At Gamescom 2015, Square Enix announced that players who purchased the game on Xbox One would receive the backward-compatible version of Just Cause 2 for the Xbox 360. Console players who purchased the game's Day One Edition are eligible to enter a contest held by Avalanche and Square Enix, which tasks players to score Chaos Points to top the leaderboard. The winner of the contest would get a real-life island, or US$50,000 cash.

The game's expansion pass, Air, Land and Sea Expansion Pass, introduces three different mission sets which add new weapons, enemies, missions, and vehicles to the game. The first expansion set, titled Sky Fortress, which includes a jet-powered wingsuit and a new aerial area, was released on 15 March 2016 (7 March for players who own the Air, Land and Sea Expansion Pass for the game). The second pack, Mech Land Assault, which introduces a mech equipped with a gravity gun, a new area called Lacrima, and new enemies, has been released on 11 June 2016 (3 June for Expansion pass owners). The final DLC, titled Bavarium Sea Heist, which adds a new lightning gun, the "Loochador", a boat equipped with missile launchers and miniguns, and a new area called "Stingray", a laboratory owned by Eden Corporation, was released on 18 August 2016 (11 August for Expansion Pass owners).

A multiplayer mod developed by the team that created Just Cause 2: Multiplayer Mod has been developed. In July 2016, Avalanche hired the lead developer of the mod, Cameron Foote, to work on projects within the studio. As a result, while the mod team will continue to support the Just Cause 2 multiplayer mod, the one for the Just Cause 3 will be cancelled. In July 2016, a team called Nanos GbR, who had previously produced multiplayer mods for Grand Theft Auto IV and Mafia II, announced plans to build a similar mod for Just Cause 3, which was ultimately released on Steam on 20 July 2017.

== Reception ==
Reception

Aggregate score
Aggregator	Score
Metacritic	PC: 74/100; PS4: 73/100; XONE: 71/100

Review scores
Publication	Score
Destructoid	8/10
Electronic Gaming Monthly	9/10
Eurogamer	8/10; 4.5/5
Game Informer	8/10
GameRevolution	3.5/5
GameSpot	8/10
GamesRadar+	3/5
Giant Bomb	4/5
IGN	PC: 8/10; PS4/XONE: 5.9/10
PC Gamer (US)	67/100
Polygon	8.5/10
VideoGamer.com	6/10

Just Cause 3 received "mixed or average" reviews from critics, according to review aggregator website Metacritic.

Reviewers praised the open world environment, destruction mechanics and its promotion of player agency, but criticized the narrative and technical issues.

=== Awards ===
Year	Award	Category	Result	Ref.
2015	NAVGTR Awards 2015	Game, Franchise Action	Nominated	
2016	Steam Awards 2016	The 'Boom Boom' Award	Nominated	
2016	19th Annual D.I.C.E. Awards	Action Game of the Year	Nominated	
2016	19th Annual D.I.C.E. Awards	Outstanding Technical Achievement	Nominated	
2017	Steam Awards 2017	The 'Cry Havoc And Let Slip The Dogs Of War' Award	Won	
