= Just Cause (video game) =

2006 action-adventure game

- Box art, featuring Rico Rodriguez
- Developer: Avalanche Studios
- Publisher: Eidos Interactive
- Directors: Christofer Sundberg; Linus Blomberg; Stefan Ljungqvist
- Producer: Fredrik Sjöö
- Designer: Magnus Nedfors
- Programmers: Andreas Thorsen; Sara Roos; Fredrik Lönn
- Artists: Johan Carlberg; Conny Bergqvist; Mats Bergström; Svante Danielsson; Staffan Norling; Timo Väisänen; Vidar Rapp
- Writers: Odd Ahlgren; Matthew J. Costello; Neil Richards
- Composer: Rob Lord
- Series: Just Cause
- Platforms: Windows; PlayStation 2; Xbox; Xbox 360
- Release: EU: 22 September 2006; NA: 27 September 2006; AU: 29 September 2006
- Genre: Action-adventure
- Mode: Single-player

Just Cause is a 2006 third-person action-adventure game set in an open world environment. It is developed by Swedish developer Avalanche Studios and published by Eidos Interactive, and is the first game in the Just Cause series.

It was released for Microsoft Windows, PlayStation 2, Xbox, and Xbox 360. Additionally, the game can be purchased from the Xbox digital store and played on Xbox One and Xbox Series consoles through the Xbox backwards compatibility program.

The area explored during the game is described as being over 1,024 km^{2} (395 mi^{2}) in size, with 21 story missions and over 300 side missions to complete. As of 23 April 2009, it has sold more than one million copies.

== Gameplay ==
The core gameplay consists of elements of a third-person shooter and a driving game, with a large, open world environment in which to move. On foot, the player's character is capable of walking, swimming, and jumping, as well as utilizing weapons and basic hand-to-hand combat. Players can take control of a variety of vehicles, including cars, boats, aircraft, helicopters, and motorcycles. Players can also perform stunts with their cars in which they can stand on the roof and jump to another car, or choose to open their parachute while still in motion on the roof. Other key features of the game include skydiving, base jumping, and parasailing (by latching onto a moving car or boat while one's parachute is deployed).

The open, non-linear environment allows players to explore and choose how they wish to play the game. Although storyline missions are necessary to progress through the game, players can complete them at their own leisure. When not taking on a storyline mission, players can roam freely. However, doing so can attract unwanted and potentially fatal attention from the authorities.

The player can partake in a variety of optional side missions, for example, liberating a village or taking over a drug cartel hideout. These are necessary to gain points with certain factions.

== Plot ==
Rico Rodriguez, an operative for an organization known only as the "Agency", being dropped into a Caribbean island nation called San Esperito to link up with his mentor and Agency superior, Tom Sheldon, and help him overthrow San Esperito's dictator, President Salvador Mendoza, whom the Agency believes to be in possession of weapons of mass destruction. After his arrival, Rico meets up with Sheldon and fellow agent Maria Kane, and they ally themselves with a guerrilla group and the Rioja drug cartel staging a rebellion against both Mendoza and the Montano drug cartel, which has exploited the corruption of the regime to expand its operations throughout San Esperito. Most of the game focuses on Rico's efforts to dismantle Mendoza's regime, eliminate the Black Hand mercenaries hired to oppress the people of San Esperito, and fight back against the cartels. Rico can also assist in the liberation of various territories to further destabilize the government's rule over the island.

Eventually, Sheldon discovers that Mendoza does, indeed, have control of WMDs, and with San Esperito lost to his control, the president is forced to retreat to his private island just off the mainland. To stop him from using the weapons, Sheldon and Kane fly Rico to the island, causing Mendoza to attempt an escape by jet. However, Rico boards the jet and kills Mendoza and his remaining bodyguards, ending his reign over the islands and allowing the Agency to secure the WMDs.

== Development ==
Development of Just Cause began at Avalanche Studios in the early 2000s, with the team aiming to create a large-scale open-world action game that emphasized freedom of movement and emergent gameplay. A major technical focus was the studio’s proprietary Avalanche Engine, which was designed to stream vast environments seamlessly, allowing players to traverse long distances without loading screens. To support this vision, developers prioritized systemic mechanics—such as physics, vehicle handling, and environmental interactions—over tightly scripted missions. The team also experimented with verticality and traversal, laying the groundwork for mechanics like parachuting and vehicle hijacking that would later define the series. Hardware limitations of the PlayStation 2 influenced design choices, requiring careful optimization to maintain performance while still delivering an unusually expansive world for its time.

== Reception ==
Reception

Aggregate score
| Aggregator | Score | | | |
| Aggregator | PC | PS2 | Xbox | Xbox 360 |
|---|---|---|---|---|
| Metacritic | 75/100 | 67/100 | 74/100 | 73/100 |

Review scores
| Publication | Score | | | |
| Publication | PC | PS2 | Xbox | Xbox 360 |
|---|---|---|---|---|
| Computer Games Magazine | 2.5/5 | N/A | N/A | N/A |
| Electronic Gaming Monthly | N/A | 6.67/10 | 6.67/10 | 6.67/10 |
| Eurogamer | N/A | N/A | N/A | 6/10 |
| Famitsu | N/A | N/A | N/A | (X360) 32/40; 31/40 |
| Game Informer | 7.25/10 | 7.25/10 | 7.25/10 | 7.25/10 |
| GamePro | N/A | N/A | N/A | 4.25/5 |
| GameSpot | 7.2/10 | 6.7/10 | 7.2/10 | 7.2/10 |
| GameSpy | N/A | N/A | N/A | 3/5 |
| GameTrailers | N/A | N/A | N/A | 7.6/10 |
| GameZone | N/A | N/A | 7.5/10 | 7.9/10 |
| IGN | 6.8/10 | 5.5/10 | 6.8/10 | (UK) 8.8/10 (US) 6.8/10 |
| Official U.S. PlayStation Magazine | N/A | 4/10 | N/A | N/A |
| Official Xbox Magazine (US) | N/A | N/A | 8/10 | 8.5/10 |
| PC Gamer (US) | 93% | N/A | N/A | N/A |
| The Sydney Morning Herald | 3/5 | 3/5 | 3/5 | 3/5 |
| The Times | 5/5 | 5/5 | 5/5 | 5/5 |

The PC version of Just Cause received "generally favourable reviews", while the rest of the console versions received "mixed or average" reviews, according to the review aggregation website Metacritic. In Japan, where the Xbox 360 version was ported for release under the name Just Cause: Viva Revolution and published by Electronic Arts on 8 November 2007, Famitsu gave it a score of 31 out of 40, while Famitsu Xbox 360 gave it a score of one seven, one eight, one nine, and one eight for a total of 32 out of 40.

IGN noted that the gameplay of the same console version lacked depth and that the side quests are boring and repetitive. The game suffers from its share of bug-related issues though, as noted by many reviewers, who felt the game may have been "rushed" to market without sufficient time to fix certain problems. The PlayStation 2 version, in particular, suffers from a number of 'game-killing' bugs that render certain missions impossible to complete, or the entire game unplayable until it is reset. Eidos had not released a patch for the PC or Xbox 360 versions of the game.

The Times gave the game all five stars and said, "Fans of the Nintendo SNES classic Pilotwings will literally jump at the chance to parachute from any of the aircraft for spectacular views of the vast landscape below. There is bound to be a sequel, because this original is so good." Edge gave the Xbox 360 version seven out of ten and said, "For all its quirks, the overriding impression of Just Cause is favourable. There's an almost childish enthusiasm at work here – and an unparalleled sense of freedom that can be enjoyed just as easily as it can be criticised." However, 411Mania gave the same console version 6.5 out of 10 and called it "a fun game but only a must-own by a wide stretch of the imagination." The Sydney Morning Herald gave the game three stars out of five and said, "Sloppy vehicle handling, some bugs in the design of the missions and the endless travel means it doesn't hit the same high notes as Grand Theft Auto and others, but the mindless action is still good dumb fun."

The Xbox 360 version stayed on top of the Xbox 360 sales chart in the UK for three weeks in a row.

== Legacy ==
A sequel to the game developed by Avalanche Studios, published by Eidos Interactive and distributed by Square Enix, titled Just Cause 2, was released in March 2010. Just Cause 3 was revealed in November 2014 and released in December 2015. Just Cause 4 was released for Windows, PlayStation 4, and Xbox One in December 2018. A free-to-play spinoff entry for Android and iOS titled Just Cause Mobile was soft launched in November 2021 in select countries before being canceled ahead of its official release in July 2023. As of June 2022, a fifth installment in the franchise is currently in development.
