= Just Cause 4 =

2018 video game

- Developer: Avalanche Studios
- Publisher: Square Enix
- Director: Francesco Antolini
- Designer: Joe Ishikura
- Writer: Omar Shakir
- Composer: Zach Abramson
- Series: Just Cause
- Platforms: Microsoft Windows; PlayStation 4; Xbox One
- Release: 4 December 2018
- Genre: Action-adventure
- Mode: Single-player

Just Cause 4 is a 2018 action-adventure game developed by Avalanche Studios and published by Square Enix. It is the fourth game in the Just Cause series and the sequel to 2015's Just Cause 3 and was released for Microsoft Windows, PlayStation 4, and Xbox One on 4 December 2018.

In the game, the player assumes the role of series protagonist Rico Rodríguez who arrives in the fictional nation of Solís to take down The Black Hand, the world's biggest private military. The game uses a new version of Avalanche's Apex game engine. The new technology allows the game to feature diverse and extreme weather effects, including blizzards, sandstorms, tornadoes and more. Square Enix External Studios worked with Avalanche for the development.

Just Cause 4 received mixed reviews upon release, with criticisms directed towards its story, mission design, cutscenes and voice acting, while the graphics, sound design, controls and the open world mechanics are praised, the game also failed to meet the sales expectations of Square Enix.

== Gameplay ==
In this gameplay screenshot, Rico is driving towards a tornado.

Just Cause 4 is an action-adventure game played from a third-person perspective. The player assumes the role of series protagonist Rico Rodríguez. The game takes place in the fictional nation of Solís, a large open world consisting of different biomes including snowy mountains and deserts. Rico can travel the game's world using his wingsuit and grappling hook, whose functions are expanded to include the ability to attach hot air balloons and rocket boosters on objects. A new wind and particle system was introduced, and it affects Rico's traversal with his wingsuit. The game also features a weather system and environmental hazards such as tornados and thunderstorms.

The game features a large variety of vehicles and firearms, including exotic weapons like the Wind Gun and the Lightning Gun. Each weapon also has an alternate firing mode. Players can call for supply drop any time in the game. During combat, he may be assisted by allies who are controlled by artificial intelligence. The game includes a frontline system in which the rebel forces fight against the Black Hand army at the borders of their territories. Rico can participate in these battles at any time.

== Plot ==
=== Characters and setting ===
The game is set in a fictional South American country called Solís, which is home to extreme weather conditions. Rico Rodríguez takes on the Black Hand, the world's most powerful private army run by Gabriela Morales, a newly introduced character. The Black Hand served as a mercenary group to dictators Salvador Mendoza of Just Cause and Sebastiano Di Ravello in Just Cause 3. When Rico is shown evidence that his late father was working with The Black Hand, he plunges into the South American nation of Solís, the homeland of the Black Hand in search of answers.

=== Plot ===
After the events of Just Cause 3, Rico Rodríguez is approached by Mira Morales, a native of Solís, who says that Rico's father, Miguel Rodríguez, was working on the Illapa Project, a weather weapon that Oscar Espinosa is using to control the people of Solís.

After a failed attempt at deposing Espinosa and a run-in with his private army, the Black Hand, which is led by Mira's cousin Gabriela Morales, Rico forms an army of his own with Mira, named the 'Army of Chaos', aimed at taking down Project Illapa and ending Espinosa's regime. Along the way, he meets up with Luis "Sargento", an eager commander of the Army of Chaos; Izzy, a hacker; Garland King, a filmmaker obsessed with filming stunts in Solís; and Javi Huerta, an archeologist wishing to uncover the history behind Solís and the Espinosa legacy. As Rico sets out to destroy the four prototype weather cores being tested in Solís, he also meets up with Lanza Morales, Mira's uncle and a scientist who worked on Project Illapa; César Pedrone, a former pilot turned conspiracy theorist; and Tom Sheldon, Rico's old handler at the Agency.

Soon, it is revealed that years ago, Miguel, together with Lanza, and Espinosa's father, Leon Espinosa, worked on the project with the aim of controlling the weather for the good of the people. However, Espinosa, convinced that his father was wasting his family's money on the project, took over after his father's sudden death and intended to weaponise Illapa's technology and research to sell to the highest bidder. Miguel, disgusted by the idea, left the project, but Espinosa used his control of Sebastiano Di Ravello in Medici and connections with the Agency to kill Miguel, before proceeding to imprison Lanza to force him to continue working on the project.

After Rico succeeds in destroying the auxiliary three weather cores, the Army of Chaos prepares to launch a final assault on Espinosa's mountain stronghold, which holds the final experimental weather core. Espinosa and Gabriela have a heated argument the morning of the attack, where Espinosa implicitly suggests the deployment of the last weather core to raze the entire facility, killing both the rebel forces and the Black Hand troops. After Gabriela protests this, Espinosa berates her for her inability to repel the rebels from every other Illapa facility. Espinosa sternly warns Gabriela that any failure to hold the mountain will result in the deployment of the weather core, before dismissing her. As the Army of Chaos rebels fight their way into the facility through harsh weather, it is revealed that Espinosa is unsurprisingly charging the weather core for deployment on the facility regardless. After forcibly cutting power to the facility, and supposedly halting the weather core's charge, Rico forces his way into Espinosa's vacant office. Upon realizing that the office is empty, Rico receives a voice call from Espinosa. Espinosa coldly mocks Rico for inadvertently causing the experimental core to be ready ahead of schedule, before revealing his plans to wipe out the entire facility with the core before selling it to the Agency. As the new weather core is poised to strike both the Army of Chaos and the Black Hand, Rico gains control of the core with help from Gabriela, who turns against Espinosa after she realizes that Espinosa was planning to decimate her forces regardless of his escape. Rico drives the weather core straight into Espinosa's jet, killing him and ending his regime.

As the Army of Chaos is celebrating their victory, Rico reveals that he and his father were just 'pawns in a larger game', and that everything 'always comes back to the Agency'. With that reasoning, Rico suggests attacking the Agency next, and both Sheldon and Mira agree to join him.

== Development and release ==
Just Cause 4 was developed by Avalanche Studios and published by Square Enix. The game uses a new version of Avalanche's Apex game engine. The new technology allows the game to feature diverse and extreme weather effects, including blizzards, sandstorms, tornadoes and more. Developers of the game noted that improvements had been made to the game's artificial intelligence over Just Cause 3. These changes were intended to make non-player characters smarter so that they behave more tactically and pose more of a threat to the player. Other improvements to the game engine include physics-based rendering and a new animation system. The game includes an Easter egg gameplay sequence which replicates the viral platformer Getting Over It with Bennett Foddy (2017). It is a collaboration between Square Enix and the game's developer Bennett Foddy, who provides humorously philosophical narration for the sequence.

The game was announced during Microsoft's press conference at E3 2018, and also appeared later at Square Enix's showcase and the PC Gaming Show. On 30 October, the game was announced as having "gone gold", signifying the completion of development on the base game. The game was released for PlayStation 4, Windows, and Xbox One on 4 December 2018.

Square Enix released three pieces of downloadable content (DLC) upon the game's release. Dare Devils of Destruction, released on 30 April 2019, introduced weaponized vehicles and challenge modes. The second DLC, Los Demonios, which sees Rico defending Solís against an invading demonic force, was released on 3 July 2019. The last DLC named Danger Rising, which features new missions against the Agency and adds a hoverboard, was released on 5 September 2019.

== Reception ==
Reception

Aggregate score
Aggregator	Score
Metacritic	PC: 68/100; PS4: 65/100; XONE: 70/100

Review scores
Publication	Score
Game Informer	8/10
GameSpot	6/10
IGN	7.9/10
PC Gamer (US)	73/100
PCGamesN	7/10

Edit on Wikidata

According to review aggregator Metacritic, Just Cause 4 received "mixed or average" reviews from critics. While the open-world gameplay, controls, graphics and soundtrack were praised, its story, mission design, cutscenes and voice acting were criticized. The game was also heavily criticized by users who noted the game's regression in graphics quality relative to past installments in the series, in particular pointing out the greatly simplified water effects and flat-looking vegetation. This led to Square Enix developing a patch in an attempt to alleviate these complaints, with partial success.

=== Sales ===
The PlayStation 4 version of Just Cause 4 sold 16,100 copies within its first week on sale in Japan, which placed it at number seven on the all-format video game sales chart.

During a financial briefing session, Square Enix explained that Just Cause 4 had sold fewer copies than expected, and that the number of copies sold did not cover the development costs.

Square Enix president Yosuke Matsuda also cited the slow sales of Just Cause 4 as a significant reason for the company's low operating income in 2018.

=== Awards ===
Year	Award	Category	Result	Ref.
2019	National Academy of Video Game Trade Reviewers Awards	Control Design, 3D	Nominated	
2019	National Academy of Video Game Trade Reviewers Awards	Game, Franchise Adventure	Nominated	
2019	2019 G.A.N.G. Awards	Best Original Instrumental ("Main Theme")	Nominated	
2019	2019 Webby Awards	Action Game	Won	
2019	2019 Webby Awards	Technical Achievement	Nominated	
