= Mad Max (2015 video game) =

2015 video game

- Developer: Avalanche Studios
- Publisher: Warner Bros. Interactive Entertainment (Note: Feral Interactive published the Linux and macOS versions.)
- Director: Frank Rooke
- Producer: John Fuller
- Designer: Magnus Nedfors
- Programmer: Fredrik Lönn
- Artist: Martin Bergquist
- Writer: Odd Ahlgren
- Composer: Mats Lundgren
- Series: Mad Max
- Platforms: PlayStation 4; Windows; Xbox One; Linux; macOS
- Release: PS4, Windows, XOne: NA/UK: 1 September 2015; AU: 2 September 2015; NZ: 3 September 2015; EU: 4 September 2015; Linux, macOS: WW: 20 October 2016
- Genres: Action-adventure, vehicular combat
- Mode: Single-player

Mad Max is a 2015 action-adventure video game based on the Mad Max franchise developed by Avalanche Studios and published by Warner Bros. Interactive Entertainment. The game follows Max Rockatansky as he progresses through the wasteland building a vehicle, the Magnum Opus, to battle against a gang of hostile raiders led by Scabrous Scrotus and reach the storied "Plains of Silence", where he hopes to find peace. Mad Max emphasizes vehicular combat, in which players can use weapon and armor upgrades on their car to fight enemies. It is set in an open world, a post-apocalyptic wasteland consisting of deserts, canyons, and caves. The game adopted a free-flowing combat system, similar to Rocksteady Studios' Batman: Arkham series.

Two other Mad Max games, developed by Cory Barlog and Interplay Entertainment respectively, were in production before the announcement of this game, but neither of them were successfully released. Although Mad Max is not based on a specific film in the series, it was inspired by its universe, features locations that appear in the films, and franchise co-creator George Miller was consulted during the game's pre-production. Avalanche Studios found developing a vehicular-combat video game a challenge because of their inexperience with creating that type of game. Unlike Avalanche's previous games like the Just Cause series, Mad Max had a more mature tone. The game was re-tooled a year into development, as the studio pivoted from making Mad Max a linear experience to an open world game.

Announced at E3 2013 and originally planned for release in 2014, Mad Max was released in September the following year, several months after the theatrical release of Mad Max: Fury Road, the fourth film in the series, for PlayStation 4, Windows, and Xbox One. Feral Interactive published the game's Linux and macOS versions, while the PlayStation 3 and Xbox 360 versions were canceled. Mad Max received mixed reviews from critics. Although the game's environment, direction, vehicular combat, and graphics were praised, its quest design and story were criticized. The game underperformed commercially, with former CEO of Avalanche Studios Christofer Sundberg attributing its underwhelming performance to going on sale on the same day as Metal Gear Solid V: The Phantom Pain. Plans to release downloadable content packs for the game were scrapped.

== Gameplay ==
Gameplay screenshot showcasing vehicular combat

Mad Max is an action-adventure game set in an open world post-apocalyptic environment caused by resource shortages and ecocide. It emphasizes vehicular combat, in which the player is the eponymous Mad Max. According to its publisher, up to 60 percent of the game focuses on driving. Some weapons and tools, including flamethrowers and turbo boosts, are mounted directly onto the Magnum Opus, while others, such as a harpoon and sniper rifle, are used in conjunction with the vehicle by Chumbucket, Max's assistant, or Max himself. Max's Magnum Opus, with its V8 engine and powerful ramming ability, can destroy enemies' vehicles and weaponry. When simultaneously driving and aiming, the game changes to slow motion to allow the player to toggle between targets. Although Mad Max primarily uses a third-person perspective, the player can switch to first-person view when fighting enemies while driving the Magnum Opus. Chumbucket repairs the car when instructed to do so or when the player exits.

To encourage exploration, the Magnum Opus can be upgraded with materials scavenged from the desert, by hijacking enemies' cars or collecting their car parts. An enemy can jump on top of the Magnum Opus to make it explode, but the player can avoid that by surrounding the car with hazards such as spikes. The player can access the garage screen throughout the game, allowing them to customize the Magnum Opus. Max's garage can change and modify the car's engine, chassis, wheels, body work, paint job, and its "shell". Upgrading one aspect of the car will negatively affect other aspects; upgrading the engine will allow Max to drive faster, but handling will be more difficult. The sound produced by the engine changes when the player changes, adds, or remove parts of the Magnum Opus. Max, his armor, and weapons are customisable; the player can unlock new skills and upgrades for him as he progresses through the game and earns experience points. Max is also customisable, with his clothing, appearance, fighting skills, and weapons being modifiable. Griffa, a wasteland wanderer, also offers Max tokens which can be used to upgrade his abilities.

Mad Max features a variety of weapons, including Max's iconic shotgun, but ammunition is scarce and the game emphasizes melee combat over firearms. One weapon is the explosive Thunderstick, which can be lanced into an enemy's chest. The game has a free-flow combat system combining professional wrestling attacks and boxing techniques, similar to Warner Bros.' previous Batman: Arkham video-game series (in which indicators on enemies' heads remind the player when to strike, counter or make finishing moves). Attacks by Max during his "frenzied" state are more powerful than usual.

Mad Max's landscape consists of canyons, caves, deserts, and abandoned wastelands. The game's world is divided into several regions, with each having its own backstory and landscape. Unique landmarks and ruins can be discovered in each region. Side activities such as races, time trials, invading enemy fortresses, and eliminating enemy convoys can be found in each region. A region's threat level is lowered by completing these activities, facilitating its navigation. Each region has a boss, who can be found and defeated in their base. Some of the game's strongholds are friendly, and eliminating hostile strongholds gives Max additional quests and rewards. These strongholds can be upgraded, offering Max different benefits such as helping Max to collect scraps when the game is turned off, or restoring Max's health and shotgun ammo upon visits. Max can ascend in a hot-air balloon (permanently attached to the ground) to look for new objectives and locations. After seeing the objectives through binoculars, they are highlighted on the map. Max can be guided by Chumbucket in strategically completing his objectives. Max is accompanied by a dog companion who can detect land mines. Max has limited climbing abilities, and objects that he can climb are highlighted in yellow.

Most resources in the game are scarce except for gasoline, which is needed for driving. The player can collect one jerrycan at a time, storing it in the back of the Magnum Opus, and can find collectibles (history relics) throughout the game. The relics are primarily photos and notes of the wasteland before the apocalypse. Food and water are vital to Max's survival; the player can collect them in the wasteland and use them to replenish their health. Max can also eat small animals, such as rodents, and maggots from decomposing corpses, to replenish his health, and areas where he can find food and supplies have crows flying around them. As initially described, the player would be able to venture into the Big Nothing, an uncharted, volatile area of the wasteland with dangerous sandstorms and no food or water in which rare parts for the Magnum Opus could be found (according to Avalanche, the "Big Nothing" made the game map infinite) but ultimately this was not a feature of the final gameplay. A dynamic day-night cycle, a weather system and a variety of environmental hazards are included in the game, whose terrain is affected by weather and natural disasters.

== Plot ==
Highway patrol officer-turned-survivalist Max Rockatansky (Bren Foster) journeys in search of what he calls the Plains of Silence. He runs into War Boys led by Scabrous Scrotus (Travis Willingham), son of Immortan Joe and ruler of Gastown. The War Boys run Max off the road and steal his car and supplies, leaving him to die in the desert. Max chases them and duels Scrotus on top of his vehicle, the Land Mover. Scrotus sics his war hound on Max, but after Max fends off the dog, Scrotus throws it aside in disgust. Max then stabs Scrotus in the head with his own chainsaw, but Scrotus, with the broken chainsaw blade still stuck in his head, kicks Max off the Land Mover.

Max obtains a weapon and clothes from a dead Wastelander, cares for the wounded dog, and resolves to find Scrotus's base of operations and recover his car. In the desert, Max meets a hunchbacked mechanic named Chumbucket (Jason Spisak). Max agrees to find parts for Chumbucket's project, a car he calls the Magnum Opus; Chumbucket believes that Max has been sent by God to aid him and addresses him as "Warrior Saint". Max must first liberate Wasteland leaders' territories from the War Boys: Jeet (Josh Keaton), whose stronghold is in an old lighthouse, and Gut Gash (Liam O'Brien), whose followers believe that they will be protected from a flood in their ship stronghold built on the remains of an oil tanker. Chumbucket builds an exploding harpoon launcher for the Magnum Opus, allowing Max to destroy a massive gate protected by War Boys and explore new territory. Max and Chumbucket must then save Pink Eye (Adrienne Barbeau), a woman whose mechanical skill rivals Chumbucket's, from an invasion of her silo base led by Stank Gum—one of Scrotus' Top Dogs.

Searching for a V8 engine for the Magnum Opus, Max learns about a race in Gastown with a Big Chief V8 as a prize. After winning the race against Stank Gum (Yuri Lowenthal) and defeating the fighter Tenderloin in a Thunderdome duel, Max receives the engine and the concubine Hope (Courtenay Taylor). His victory is short-lived; Scrotus recognizes Max and attacks him. After he is shot with a crossbow and thrown down a mine shaft, Max is saved by Hope, who takes him to the medic Organic Mechanic (Fred Tatasciore) and his blood donor Scab (Orion Acaba) before Max loses consciousness. While he is undergoing surgery, he has a hallucination of marrying Hope, officiated by Chumbucket and a man with a dog's head. When he wakes up, he and Hope steal the Big Chief; they drive to the temple of Deep Friah (Robin Atkin Downes), a friendly fire cultist.

At the temple, Hope asks Max to find her daughter Glory (Madison Carlon), who had fled to Buzzard territory. He travels to the Underdune and rescues Glory from the Buzzards. Returning, he discovers that Chumbucket has taken the Magnum Opus to his old home. Max follows him in one of Deep Friah's cars, but learns that Scrotus and Stank Gum tortured Chumbucket, who revealed Hope and Glory's location and their ties to Max. Max kills Stank Gum, rushes back to the temple and finds Hope hanged and Glory tortured on the floor. Glory dies in his arms, and Max swears vengeance against Scrotus.

He returns to Gastown and learns Scrotus' location from Scab. Max and Chumbucket find Scrotus driving around the Purgatory Flatlands, and after a prolonged chase the Land Mover is left teetering on the edge of a cliff. Over Chumbucket's protests, Max rams the wreck with the Magnum Opus, leaping clear while Chumbucket is killed and both vehicles are sent over the cliff. Scrotus reappears driving Max's Interceptor, and the two fight on until Max pulls the chainsaw blade back out of Scrotus' head, killing him. Max enters the Interceptor, restores a picture of his family to the dashboard, and drives away.

== Development ==
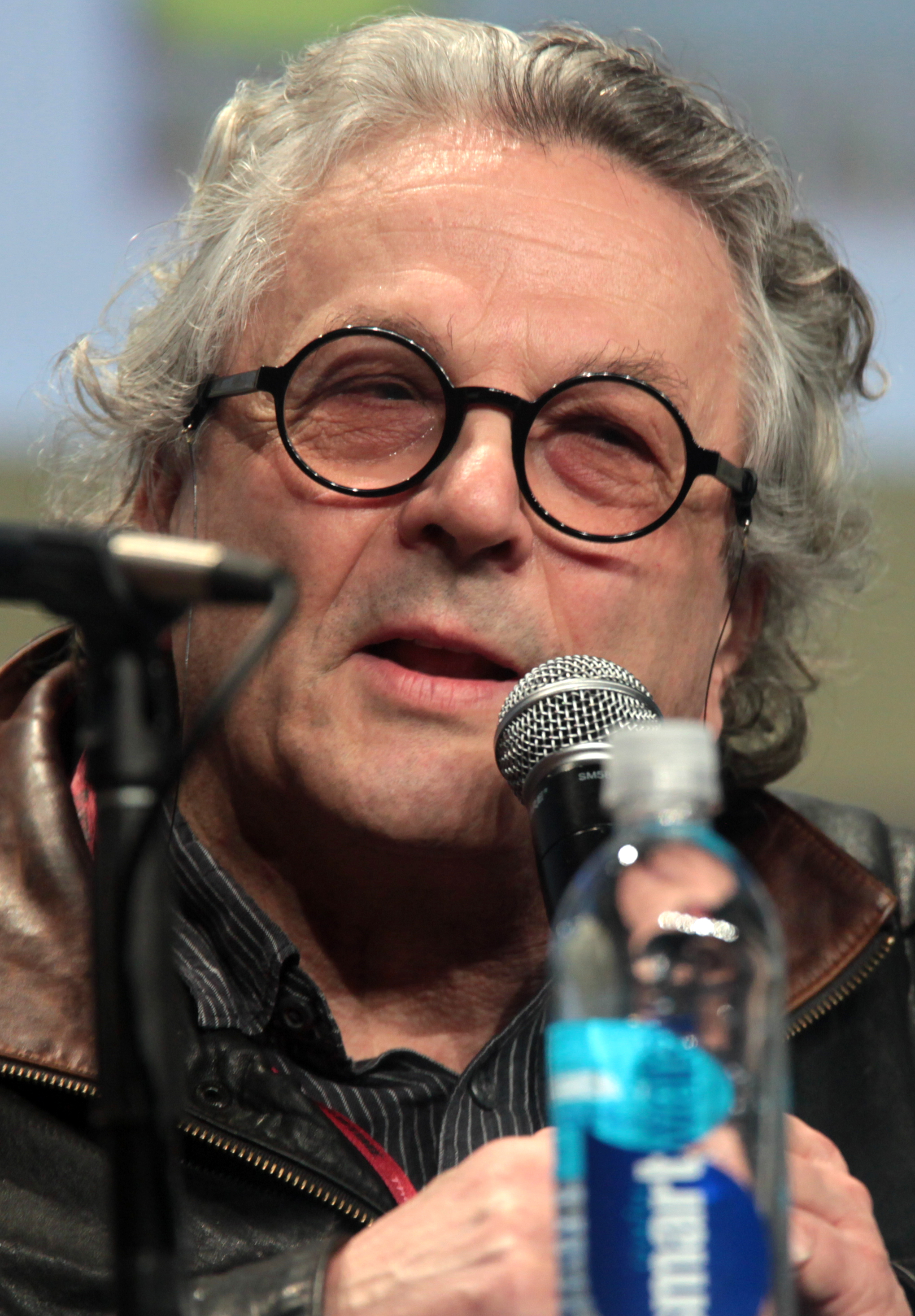
George Miller provided input during the game's pre-production period.

A video game set in the Mad Max universe was mentioned by franchise creator George Miller in a 2008 interview. Miller joined God of War II director Cory Barlog to develop the game after Barlog left Sony Computer Entertainment. The project was originally intended as a tie-in with a Mad Max animated film which would be released simultaneously. The film's production was suspended to allow adequate production time for the game. After Barlog announced in 2008 that a publisher for the game was being sought, no further information about the project was forthcoming. In 2010, Barlog was a consultant for Avalanche Studios, leaving in 2012 for Crystal Dynamics. A Mad Max: Fury Road tie-in video game was in development by Interplay Entertainment, but was scrapped when Electronic Arts acquired the franchise's video-game rights for $20 million.

Avalanche Studios revealed that they were working on the game in 2013. Avalanche's founder and CEO Christofer Sundburg said that Miller and Barlog's project was not the Mad Max game announced by Avalanche, though Barlog briefly worked on a Mad Max game while working at Avalanche. Miller had collaborated with Avalanche during the game's pre-production in mid-2011. The game was not intended to be a tie-in for Fury Road; its setting and story are original. This decision was made because the game's publisher, Warner Bros. Interactive Entertainment, believed that a standalone game was more beneficial to players than a "play-the-movie game" after the success of its Batman: Arkham series. Locations which have appeared in the films, such as Gas Town and Thunderdome, are featured in the game. Full production of the game began before May 2012. According to Avalanche, the game was retooled during development. It was revealed in 2024 that the studio, despite its experience in working on open world games, were forced to make Mad Max a linear experience during the game's first year of development.

Unlike previous Avalanche games, such as Just Cause 2, the game's tone is more mature and its narrative is emphasized. Similar to the films, Max seldom speaks or expresses emotion; his thoughts are reflected by his actions. According to the team, Max is traumatized by past experiences (such as losing his family); this makes him "insane", "unstable", and "mad". These qualities are reflected in the game's "rage" mode, in which Max inflicts additional damage on enemies. Gaming journalists invited to preview at E3 2013 noted that Max had an American accent, rather than the Australian accent of the film series, and fans protested his new American voice. Australian actor Bren Foster was subsequently chosen for the role. Chumbucket, Max's mechanic and companion, is obsessed with the Magnum Opus; according to the game's lead writer, he "has a pseudo-religious/sexual relationship with engines". Scabrous Scrotus, the game's main antagonist, is a warlord designed as a "bloodthirsty monster that only can find solace from his own pain through the suffering of others". Enemies' faces are painted and scarred; according to game director Frank Rooke, their appearance "is kind of the approach of how this civilization merged into this kind of state". Like the films, the game does not identify the apocalypse; its developers wanted to give "a sense of mystery" to the wasteland so players could imagine how the wasteland evolved. The game's setting is described as "wasteland creole", with elements of a number of civilizations, so its characters have a variety of accents.

Lead designer Emil Krafting said that gameplay was the top priority during development. Like the Just Cause series, the developer aimed to give players autonomy by providing tools to create their own events. The studios intended to build a dynamic world, creating "a seamless series of events". The game was inspired by the atmosphere of the Mad Max universe, rather than a particular film in the series. They were not influenced by other post-apocalyptic video games such as Fallout, Rage, and Borderlands since most of those games were inspired by the original Mad Max. The company said that the game's vehicular combat posed a challenge because of their inexperience with that type of game. The car customization system was designed to give players more freedom. Garages allowing players to upgrade and repair their cars were originally intended to be featured in the game. The idea was later scrapped, since the studio thought the element "interfered with gameplay".

Regions feature different landmarks to create a variety of environments. The developers used vibrant colors to depict the sky in contrast to the brown ground.

The game's world was inspired by the Just Cause series, which features large sandboxes for players to explore. One challenge faced by the developers was building a wasteland with a variety of environments, since Mad Max is Avalanche's first post-apocalyptic game. They spent most of their time designing ground and terrain variations to minimize repetition in the landscape. The game world is scaled according to gameplay density and frequency; the development team emphasized creating a world with choices and distractions, rather than focusing on size. According to design director Magnus Nedfors, the game world was designed to be barren, threatening, and hostile, while also offering "high-octane, full speed ahead, full of action moments" as well as “moments of solitude" whereas players in take in the surroundings and relax. Sundberg hoped that players would compare Mad Max's desert setting to the western setting of Red Dead Redemption. Since the game is set in a desert, the team used vibrant colors for the sky. Mad Max is powered by Apex Engine (formerly known as Avalanche Engine), an in-house proprietary engine. The team introduced new graphical features to the engine during the development of Mad Max. The team also worked on improving the world's draw distance and ensured that gameplay across the three major platforms have no significant difference.

== Release and marketing ==
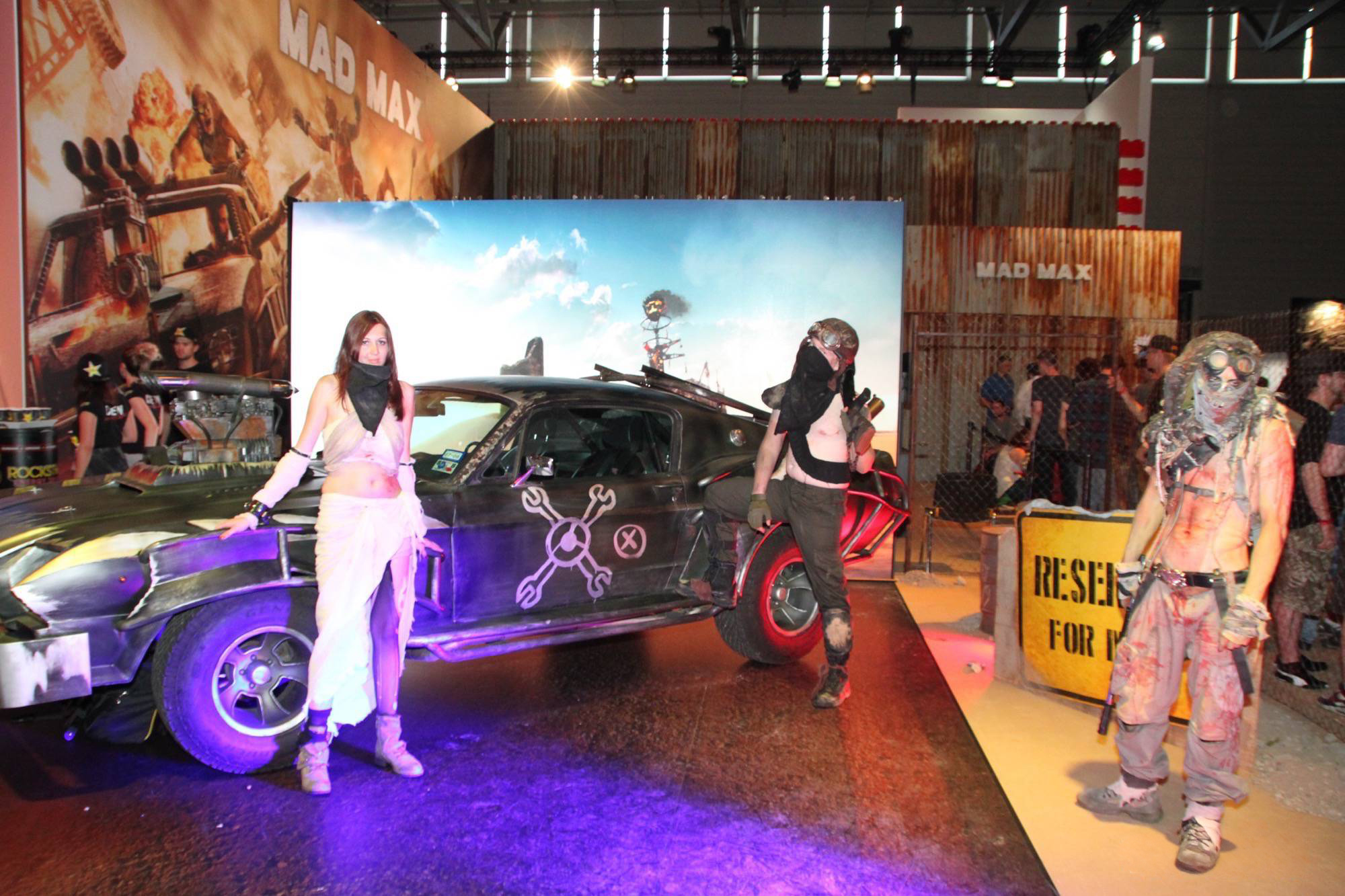
Promotion at Gamescom 2015

On 14 February 2013, a blurry screenshot of the game was released by Sundberg. The game was announced at E3 2013 on 10 June at Sony's press conference, with a scheduled 2014 release for PlayStation 3, PlayStation 4, Windows, Xbox 360, and Xbox One. In April 2014, Avalanche announced that Mad Max would be delayed until the following year, The game was released on 1 September 2015 in North America and the United Kingdom, 2 September in Australia, 3 September in New Zealand and 4 September in Europe for PlayStation 4, Windows, and Xbox One. It was announced on 3 May 2015 that the PlayStation 3 and Xbox 360 versions had been cancelled due to hardware restrictions, but a Linux port was announced. The game was released for Linux and macOS on 20 October 2016.

Players who pre-ordered the game could receive the Ripper, an additional Magnum Opus design. The Ripper, a steelbook, collector's box, mini-license plate and Blu-ray copy of Mad Max: Fury Road were included in the Post-Apocalypse Edition. PlayStation 4-version purchasers could access a Road Warrior Survival Kit, with twelve hood ornaments for the Magnum Opus, exclusively until 30 November 2015. To promote Mad Max, Warner Bros. Interactive Entertainment sponsored launch events. In Australia, the company invited artists to create artwork on their vehicles with dust. They joined Uber for a Seattle promotion in which Uber users could access a free ride "straight from the post-apocalypse". The offer was free, since "dollars are worthless in the wasteland".

== Reception ==
=== Critical reception ===
Reception

Aggregate scores
Aggregator	Score
Metacritic	(PC) 73/100 (XONE) 72/100 (PS4) 69/100
OpenCritic	27%

Review scores
Publication	Score
Destructoid	7/10
Eurogamer	Recommended
Game Informer	7.5/10
GameSpot	6/10
GamesRadar+	4/5
GameTrailers	7.4/10
IGN	8.4/10
Polygon	5.5/10

Mad Max received "mixed or average" reviews from critics, according to review aggregator Metacritic. George Miller said in a 2024 interview that the game "wasn't as good as" how he wanted it to be. Retrospectively, the game was considered to be "underrated".

Its story received a mixed response. Brandin Tyrrel of IGN found the story surprising and genuine, despite most of the action occurring later in the game. Tyrrel wrote that the characters have different personalities and distinct qualities, and considered them the "true star" of the game. According to Chris Carter of Destructoid, the game's story engages the player. Leon Hurley of GamesRadar found the overall story weak and "barely exist[ing] for the majority of the game", but thought the game's climax was exciting. Matt Bertz of Game Informer also criticized the story, calling it thin and light, and called the voice actors' performances uneven.

Mad Max's world design received generally positive reviews. According to Brandin Tyrrel, it captured the films' savage tone and the game's sandbox was a "gorgeous" setting for players to explore. GamesRadar's Leon Hurley praised the game's scale, which he compared to The Witcher 3: Wild Hunt. Martin Robinson of Eurogamer compared its scale favorably to Avalanche's previous Just Cause game series, and opined that Avalanche had successfully combined the Mad Max universe with an open-world game design. Matt Bertz praised the game's inhospitable atmosphere, commending Avalanche for adding a variety of styles and a vibrant sky to an otherwise-boring sandbox. Daniel Bloodworth of GameTrailers echoed Bertz, calling each region unique and distinct. Bloodworth also praised Avalanche for its efforts in crafting the world. Peter Brown of GameSpot praised Mad Max's natural disasters, writing that it set a new standard for in-game weather effects. Philip Kollar of Polygon criticized the game's layout, writing that every location in the game feels identical and its bland environments discourage exploration.

Tyrrel considered the vehicular combat one of the game's best elements, adding a layer of creativity. Brown praised the car action, calling it intense, complex, and unpredictable, but criticized the over-simplistic and shallow on-foot combat. Carter compared the game's vehicular controls to the best racing games, and commended its handling. He also praised the car mechanics, writing that it has offered players a cinematic experience. Tyrrel liked the additions to the game's combat (such as the introduction of weapons and the Fury mode), writing that they added depth to the combat. Hurley praised the game's progression system, which he found satisfying, and the balance between vehicular and on-foot combat. Bloodworth wrote that the melee combat used a "tried-and-true system" which worked well, despite awkward camera angles. Kollar criticized the boss fights, which he thought lacked variety.

Other gameplay aspects received mixed reviews. Tyrrel praised the customization system for Max and the Magnum Opus, since the customization impacts the gameplay and makes the overall experience more rewarding; Kollar echoed this. Brown criticized the game for failing to offer much challenge or a sense of accomplishment to players. He called the health system a redundant addition in which resources, such as water and food, play an insignificant role and can be neglected by players. Brown also criticized the scrap-collecting system, writing that it frustrated most players and slowed the game's pace. However, Robinson wrote that those elements reflect the barbarian nature of the wasteland. He praised its world design (which he thought echoed the films), describing it as "a world of twisted metal and sudden violence that's there to be survived rather than conquered". Bloodworth criticized the game's stronghold system, which he called repetitive. Bertz criticized the game's lack of a climbing system, which hinders movement; this was echoed by Carter.

Mad Max's quest design also received mixed reviews. Tyrrel praised the content and activities scattered across the world, calling the activities engaging for most players. However, he disliked the repetition which dragged down their replay value. Hurley found it easy for players to become confused in the game's early stages, since the objectives are unclear. Brown criticized the structure of several quests which force players to use a certain method, removing freedom and creativity. Chris Carter of Destructoid wrote that the game brought nothing new to the genre, and its quests and features were too similar to typical Ubisoft open-world design.

The game had some technical problems when it was released. Tyrrel noted an unstable frame rate and occasional texture pop-up, and Kollar identified audio problems.

=== Sales ===
Mad Max was the second-best selling game in the United Kingdom in its first week of release on the United Kingdom software retail chart, only behind Metal Gear Solid V: The Phantom Pain, which was released the same day. According to the NPD Group, it was the eighth-best selling game in the United States in September 2015.

Former Avalanche CEO Christofer Sundberg revealed in 2024 that "[WB] blamed us for the bad sales" and that canceled DLC was "just sitting there waiting to be released". Sundberg attributed the game's commercial underperformance to being released on the same day as Metal Gear Solid V: The Phantom Pain, and his attempts at convincing Warner Bros. to move the game's release date were unsuccessful.
