= Just Cause 2 =

2010 video game

- Cover art featuring protagonist Rico Rodriguez
- Developer: Avalanche Studios (Note: Additional development by Square Enix London Studios)
- Publisher: Square Enix
- Director: Magnus Nedfors
- Producer: Daniel Willför
- Designer: Peter Johansson
- Programmer: Fredrik Larsson
- Artist: Stefan Ljungqvist
- Writers: Odd Ahlgren; Matthew J. Costello; Neil Richards
- Composer: Mats Lundgren
- Series: Just Cause
- Platforms: PlayStation 3; Windows; Xbox 360
- Release: NA: 23 March 2010; EU: 26 March 2010; AU: 1 April 2010
- Genre: Action-adventure
- Mode: Single-player

Just Cause 2 is a 2010 action-adventure video game developed by Avalanche Studios and published by Square Enix. The sequel to 2006's Just Cause, it features Rico Rodriguez, a major operative of the fictional Agency who arrives at Panau (a fictional island nation in Maritime Southeast Asia) to overthrow dictator Pandak "Baby" Panay and confront former mentor Tom Sheldon. The gameplay involves Rico fighting hostile militants with guns and a grappling hook, enabling players to tether objects to each other and slingshot into the air with a parachute. Just Cause 2 introduces the Chaos System, in which players must complete missions and destroy government property on Panau for Chaos points.

The game was developed as an improvement of Just Cause; its team saw missed opportunities in the first game, analyzing and refining it. As a result, mission design, artificial intelligence and most core gameplay mechanics were overhauled. The game was powered by Avalanche Studios' Avalanche 2.0 Engine. Panau, inspired by Southeast Asia, was considered by the team a good location for an action game. Square Enix London Studios worked with Avalanche for the development. It was announced in 2007 with a demo attracting two million players.

The game was released in March 2010 for Windows, PlayStation 3 and Xbox 360. Additionally, the game can be purchased from the Xbox digital store and played on Xbox One and Xbox Series consoles through the Xbox backwards compatibility program.

Just Cause 2 received generally positive reviews from critics, who praised its gameplay, open-ended nature, stunts, world design, and graphics while criticizing its story, gunplay, and mission design. The game sold over six million copies worldwide, exceeding its original projections. The game was supported with downloadable content at release, and a multiplayer fan project was eventually approved as an add-on. A sequel, Just Cause 3, was released in late 2015.

== Gameplay ==
Screenshot of Rico Rodriguez grappling under a helicopter while receiving Chaos points by destroying government property

Just Cause 2 is a third-person action-adventure game in which players control Rico Rodriguez, field operative of the Agency, in an effort to overthrow the island dictatorship of Panau: an open world for players to explore. The game has three types of missions. Agency missions advance the story and are the game's main campaign; faction missions task players to assist the game's three factions, and stronghold missions task players to infiltrate government bases and liberate them for the factions. To advance through the campaign missions a player must earn chaos points, a progression system introduced in the game. Players earn chaos points for completing missions and destroying designated government property. As the number of chaos points increases, the factions gain influence and the government begins to collapse. In addition to typical missions, Just Cause 2 has race challenges which give players cash.

The game's open world is free for players to explore when they are not on missions. Panau is described as an area of about 1,000 square kilometres (390 sq mi). There are a variety of landscapes, including deserts, mountains and jungles, and over three hundred settlements. The settlements contain government properties, which can be destroyed, and unlockables such as cash stashes and weapon, vehicle and armor parts. Finding all the collectibles and destroying all the government properties will help players liberate a settlement and receive chaos points. When players create chaos or enter restricted areas, they generate heat noticed by hostile government militants; the heat decreases when the player evades them. The map is Rico's PDA, with points of interest including mission locations, settlements, military outposts, race challenges and the player's progress. Waypoints may be set on the PDA.

Players can use a variety of weapons to fight enemies. The game features a large arsenal of weapons, from two-handed pistols to rocket launchers, and a variety of sea, land and air vehicles. Players can drive them, jump on top of them or hide in front of them while they are moving and hijack enemy vehicles, triggering a series of quick-time events. Initially, the player must acquire weapons and vehicles in the field. Early in the game, they encounter a black market supplier from whom weapons and vehicles can be purchased (with optional delivery to the player's location by helicopter). As more chaos points are gained, additional weapons, vehicles and an extraction option become available on the black market. All black-market weapons and vehicles can be upgraded in steps with weapon and vehicle components in the game world; over 2,000 parts may be acquired. Players use a beacon to access the market.

Just Cause 2 includes a grappling hook enabling players to tether objects together. In a high-speed vehicle chase a player can use the grappling hook to attach the pursuit vehicle to the ground, forcing it to stop and often damaging it by flipping. Players can also tether two enemies together. The grappling hook allows a player to pull himself, hold onto objects such as walls or helicopters and pull enemies towards Rico. The player has a parachute, which can be instantly deployed and repacked. This can be combined with the grappling hook as quick transport, with players "slingshotting" themselves into the air.

== Plot ==
Four years after Just Cause, Rico Rodriguez is dropped into Panau to find his former handler Tom Sheldon, who is suspected of going rogue and aligning himself with the country's dictator Pandak "Baby" Panay. With the aid of intelligence asset Karl Blaine and a weapons dealer only known as the Sloth Demon, Rico allies with the island's three dominant criminal gangs and factions: the Roaches, an organized crime syndicate; the Reapers, an insurgent socialist militia; and the Ular Boys, an ultranationalist rebel group which espouses traditionalism and opposes foreign influence.

Rico gathers enough information to track down Sheldon, who reveals that he has been the Sloth Demon while he was investigating a greater conspiracy behind Panay's rise to power. Rico determines that Sheldon has not gone rogue, and Sheldon tells him to continue causing chaos on Panau while he explains the situation to the Agency.

Sheldon then tells Rico to hurry to his hideout, where Rico learns that intelligence asset Jade Tan has been captured in Panay's military base and will be tortured and possibly summarily executed. Although Rico rescues her and destroys the base, Jade is bundled into a truck and a fleet of gunmen try to escape along a frozen lake. A nuclear submarine emerges from the ice, but Rico hijacks the truck and they are airlifted to safety by Kane (Sheldon and Rico's mission handler). Jade later explains that the Roaches, Reapers, and Ular Boys are secretly backed by Russia, China, and Japan, respectively, to bring down Baby Panay, but Rico and Sheldon wonder what the small island has which is so attractive to superpowers. They track down and assassinate the foreign intelligence officers liaising with the factions.

Soon afterwards, the island is engulfed in so much chaos that Panay leaves the capital for his fortified military base. Rico assaults the base with the aid of a faction of his choosing. Panay is apparently killed during the assault by Karl Blaine in a murder-suicide, but not before Panay explains that the three nations, along with the United States, have been interested in Panau for its oil reserves, supposedly the largest in the world.

With Panay dead, the situation in Panau becomes a free-for-all as foreign nations scramble to claim the oil. Russia, China and Japan send a fleet of supertankers to Panau, and the U.S. begins scrambling its military forces to defend the island. Rico is tasked with holding off the supertankers until reinforcements arrive, but a nuclear submarine suddenly surfaces. Rico investigates the submarine and finds Panay, alive but injured. Although Panay fires nuclear missiles at Russia, China, Japan and the U.S., his clothing snags on one of the missiles and he goes up with it. In pursuit, Rico grapples onto the missile; the men battle in midair as he disarms each missile.

Finally, Rico pins Panay to the exposed core of the U.S.-bound missile, and reprograms the targeting computer before jumping to safety. The missile changes course and explodes over Panau's oilfields, killing Panay and destroying the island's oil reserves. Rico rejoins Sheldon, Kane and Jade, who are dismayed at the loss of billions of dollars' worth of oil. Rico explains that oil is not worth dying for; with its oil gone, interest in Panau will be lost, the superpowers will not go to war and the island's residents will be spared. Sheldon agrees, assuring Rico that a president friendly to the U.S. will be installed on Panau and the island will be closely monitored; the group raise their glasses, toasting friendship and a job well done.

== Development ==
Just Cause 2 was developed by the Swedish Avalanche Studios, with Square Enix London Studios providing additional support. The game's predecessor, Just Cause, was a moderate commercial success and received mixed reviews from critics. The team thought that although it had potential, it was an opportunity missed and described Just Cause 2 as a "sequel waiting to be made". Shortly after the start of development, the team begin analyzing the first game's strengths and weaknesses with the intention of improving it. They wanted to use the large open world to create rewarding quests and missions, dropping the first game's side missions in favor of faction missions, stronghold takeovers and race challenges to increase gameplay density (keeping players occupied, even when simply exploring the world). This density increased the connectivity between the faction and Agency missions. Another goal was to improve the game's combat and artificial intelligence, so action stunts would be easier to perform and the game's tactical element would increase. The team overhauled the artificial intelligence, improving enemy characters' reaction to player action and their environment. The game features a Hybrid Locking System, which makes aiming easier, and a real-time destruction system. The team refined the game's driving mechanics to make them feel more realistic.

They said that its "over-the-top" action and emphasis on player freedom would distinguish Just Cause 2 from other open world games. According to Peter Johansson, many gameplay mechanics were so "crazy" that they hesitated when testing the game; they were included in the final product because it was thought that they would make the game fun to play, meeting the franchise's main goal of performing many stunts in a massive open world. Since Just Cause's grappling hook was praised, the team made it more accessible and easier to use as an essential part of the sequel's combat system. The team also refined the parachute, making it more realistic and giving players more control of its movement. They added the Chaos system, enhancing player freedom by allowing them to progress through the game in a number of ways instead of completing missions.

The game is set in Panau, described as an island with a variety of landscapes and cultural influences (including Japan, Thailand and the Malay Archipelago). The team chose the setting because they considered that its exoticism suited an action game. Hawaii and New Zealand also inspired the game world. Although the game's plot was unconnected to Just Cause, it featured a more-experienced Rico as the protagonist. According to game director Magnus Nedfors, the team retained the first game's "campy" tone. The narrative remained light and the game was made into something intentionally "silly"; the team "don't take ourselves or our game too seriously". Plot was not the primary focus of Just Cause 2, and the team took three to five months to create the story. The game runs on Avalanche Software's upgraded Avalanche Engine. Unlike Just Cause, it was released only for seventh-generation consoles and its graphics were not limited by the restrictions of older consoles. Since it is set in an open world, Avalanche co-founder Linus Bloomberg thought a long draw distance was essential to motivate players to explore the game world and the engine was modified to accommodate that feature. The PC version runs on DirectX 10 hardware, and is incompatible with Windows XP. The PlayStation 3 version allows the user to capture gameplay video and export it to the XMB or upload it to YouTube. However, most content is identical across all platforms.

== Marketing and release ==
The game was announced in January 2007 by publisher Eidos Interactive, and a year later a Christmas 2008 release was planned. Its release was later postponed to the third quarter of 2009. A demo for the game, released on 4 March 2010, attracted more than two million players. According to studio founder Christofer Sundberg, the demo was envisioned as a smaller version of the game so players could fully experience its open-ended gameplay. After Japanese publisher Square Enix acquired Eidos Interactive, it announced that the game would be released in North America on 23 March 2010 and in Europe on 26 March. Pre-orders received a map of Panau and access to the Black Market Chaos Pack. An Ultimate Edition, with the game and the Black Market Aerial and Boom Packs, was released on 20 December 2011 for the PlayStation Network.

=== Downloadable content ===
According to designer Peter Johansson, the game would support a variety of downloadable content and DLC was released on PlayStation Store, Steam and Xbox Live Marketplace after the game's release. The Black Market Aerial Pack included an F-33 Dragonfly jet fighter, dual parachute thrusters and a multi-lock missile launcher. The Black Market Boom Pack included a quad rocket launcher, a cluster bomb launcher and an air-propulsion gun. The Black Market Chaos Pack included Rico's signature gun, an Agency hovercraft, a Chevalier Classic, a bull's-eye assault rifle and Tuk Tuk Boom Boom. Although the pack is no longer available, its contents may be downloaded separately. Avalanche also released several pieces of free DLC, including a Chevalier Icebreaker (an ice-cream truck with bullbars), Tuk Tuk Boom Boom (introducing a tuk tuk with a "roof-mounted weapon of mass destruction") and a Chaos Parachute pack.

=== Multiplayer Mod ===
Just Cause 2: Multiplayer Mod originated as a fan project by two modders, Jaxm and Trix, who were impressed with the game's scale after playing its demo. They stopped modding Grand Theft Auto: Vice City and Grand Theft Auto: San Andreas, and began developing a multiplayer mod for Just Cause 2; the team eventually expanded to six. The mod was later recognized by the game's developers as an add-on. It supports achievements and adds multiplayer capability, allowing hundreds to thousands of players to interact in the game's map of Panau. After several years in the making, the mod became available as free downloadable content on Steam on 17 December 2013.

== Reception ==
Reception

Aggregate score
Aggregator	Score
Metacritic	(PC) 84/100 (PS3) 83/100 (X360) 81/100

Review scores
Publication	Score
1Up.com	A
Eurogamer	8/10
Game Informer	9/10
GameSpot	8/10
GamesRadar+	4/5
Giant Bomb	4/5
IGN	8.8/10

Just Cause 2 received generally positive reviews upon release, with critics praising its gameplay, graphics and open world; the game was widely regarded as a significant improvement to its predecessor. It was nominated for Best Action Game at the 28th Golden Joystick Awards, losing to Assassin’s Creed II.

Eric Neigher of 1UP.com praised the game's texture, draw distance, depth of field and variety, writing that such details made the game feel more alive. The explosions were praised for their visual effects. According to Neigher, the varied landscape and the grappling hook made Just Cause 2's game world superior to those of Grand Theft Auto and Infamous. Eurogamer's Simon Parkin commended Avalanche Studios for developing a "picture-postcard amalgam of Pacific landscapes" without significant technical difficulties, such as framework instability. However, Kevin VanOrd of GameSpot and Ryan Clements of IGN noted a number of gameplay problems, such as loose shooting mechanic and technical glitches. Jeff Marchiafava of Game Informer considered its world one of the most enjoyable and entertaining sandboxes for players to explore, overshadowing other open-world games with urban settings.

Just Cause 2's action elements were widely praised. Ryan Davis of Giant Bomb praised the game for its defiance of physics, increasing player enjoyment. The combined grappling hook and parachute was praised for facilitating and enhancing traversal and exploration. Eurogamer's Parkin agreed, adding that the tool was a mix of Spider-Man and Bionic Commando, but Game Informer's Marchiafava thought that the mechanic and its precision exceeded both. He praised the action stunts, especially skydiving (which he called "thrilling"). VanOrd described the stunts as "satisfying", "silly", "fun" and "crazy", and stated that travelling between locations was so enjoyable that players would rarely use the black marketeer. Clements praised Avalanche Studios for providing action only found in a "top-dollar Hollywood production" with the game's stunts. Parkin and Neigher commended its potential, with Parkin writing that players use their imagination to experiment with the grappling hook (making the game addictive). However, its gunplay (particularly the aiming system) was criticized. The game's difficulty and artificial intelligence were criticized as frustrating, as they sometimes spawned in front of the player. According to Clements and Marchiafava, its controls had a steep learning curve.

The game's mission design and progression system received mixed reviews. According to Parkin, the chaos system did not make sense; Rico sometimes destroys properties which help local citizens. He called most missions repetitive and a "grind", losing their appeal as players progress (although he praised some side missions). Parkin and VanOrd criticized the stronghold-takeover missions. Parkin added that most players probably would not have the patience to complete the settlements, since the island's appeal wanes after hours of play. Marchiafava praised the game's side activities, saying that the diversions increased its replayability. Davis criticized the missions' repetition, but liked their quantity.

Just Cause 2's story also received mixed reviews, with Neigher criticizing its mediocre voice acting and lack of logic. Clements thought the presentation of its cutscenes were not on par with the game world, and Parkin described the plot as a "low-rent thriller". Marchiafava called its story the game's weakest part, with its "unscripted" moments the high points. Most critics agreed that the strong gameplay mechanics overshadowed design and narrative flaws, and that narrative was not the game's focus.

=== Sales ===
It was the best-selling retail game in the UK when it was released, outselling Pokémon HeartGold and SoulSilver (released the same week). Although the initial sales projection was 2.2 million, sales exceeded expectations. In February 2014, describing its sales as "slow", studio founder Christofer Sundberg said that Just Cause 2 had sold more than six million copies.

== Legacy ==
Purchasers of Just Cause 2 and another Square Enix game, Sleeping Dogs, received an exclusive Rico Rodriguez outfit and the ability to perform "stunt-style takeovers" while hijacking vehicles as Officer Shen. After the game's release, the Swedish team developed Mad Max. A studio based in New York City was established to develop a new game, set in the Just Cause universe. Just Cause 3 was Game Informer's November 2014 cover game, and it was released on 1 December 2015 for Windows, PlayStation 4 and Xbox One. Purchasers of Just Cause 3 for the Xbox One would also receive Just Cause 2 via backward compatibility.
