= GuJian2 =

2013 video game

Swords of Legends 2
- Developer: Aurogon
- Publishers: Gamebar (Mainland); Soft-World International Corporation (Hong Kong)
- Producer: Gong Changjun
- Composers: Lo Chi-Yi; Zhou Zhihua; ACG Music (小旭音乐)
- Series: Gujian
- Engine: Vision
- Platform: Microsoft Windows
- Release: August 18, 2013
- Genre: RPG
- Mode: Single-player

GuJian 2 (simplified Chinese: 古剑奇谭二 永夜初晗凝碧天; traditional Chinese: 古劍奇譚二 永夜初晗凝碧天; lit. 'Old Sword Legend: Staring at the blue sky after a long night') is a 3D role-playing video game developed by Aurogon with the Vision engine and published by Gamebar. The second main entry of the Gujian series, it was originally released in China on August 18, 2013 for Microsoft Windows. A sequel, Gujian3, was released in 2018.

== Setting ==
A calamity befalls the world With the immortal tree Ju Mu as a base, the Shen Nong tribe reconstructs Liu Yue City, guiding the immortals to construct the five-colored stones and hand it over to Nuwa in order to repair the pillar of heaven. However, due to the long period of time needed, death and casualty were aplenty. There exists a tribe named "Lie Shan", who possesses psychic power. The people of the tribe entered Liu Yue City and assisted the Shen Nong. Touched by their sincerity, the Shen Nong therefore inserted a drop of their immortal blood into Gui Mu, causing the tree to blossom with the power of life; therefore allowing the people of Lie Shan to survive without food or water.

The process of repairing the heavens was difficult. The heaven's emperor Fu Yi then uses the immortal Zhao Ming sword, heading toward the Eastern Seas to kill the Ju Ao (a great turtle) and uses its legs to set them up as the four pillars. The azure sky was patched; the four pillars were set up; the surging waters were drained. However in the process, the Zhao Ming sword was destroyed. After the disaster, foul air filled the mortal realm, and people slowly began to die of illness. However, Liu Yue City was situated within the Nine Heavens, and therefore was not affected much by the foul air. The Shen Nong and Lie Shan tribe stayed within the city while looking for other suitable places to reside in. Slowly, Liu Yue City was left a barren land. The Lie Shan tribe therefore construed the Temple of Wei'e, praying every day for the immortals to return.

== Characters ==
Character	Voice	Introduction
Yue Wuyi	Zhao Yi	Born into a wealthy commerce family in Chang Fu; his father was a former accomplished general, and his mother was a woman who came from the West; hence he has half of Hu People's bloodline. His stepmother specializes in Yan Magic, and is descendant of the Jiang Yan female tribe; she treats Wuyi just like her own. Wuyi lived in comfort for many years, until one day he had an encounter with Yan Magic. From then on, he becomes interested in the ancient arts. On his journey to finding Xie Yi, he realizes that he is the son of the great general of Du Juan. He eventually convinces the Wolf King to transform his army into a commerce team.
Wenren Yu		Born into Bai Cao Valley's "Tian Gang" special forces, Renyu was used to the way of the armies from young, and becomes accustomed to life and death. She possesses a maturity and calmness beyond her years, has great sensitive hearing and is easygoing and generous. She is extremely considerate for others. Often seen as the "female version of General Zhaoyun" (a strong female warrior), Renyu also possesses a young lady's gentleness and adorableness.
Xia Yize		Xia Yize is a child of extraordinary talent. The child of Emperor Shengyuan and a mermaid, he was sent away due to his demon origins. Under a fateful occurrence, he was adopted by Tai Hua Mountain's reverent, and lived as a Taoist monk. Intelligent, hardworking and possessing a flair of Taoism. Due to his calm and respectful personality, Yize was popular among his fellow disciples. He is also low-profile and does not speak much, hence appearing cold. However, he is caring and trustworthy to people he is close with. In the end, he wanders the world with Ah Ruan, while studying the cure to prevent psychic powers from dissipating.
Ah Ruan		A girl who comes from mysterious origins. From very long ago, her only companions were two beasts, Ah Li and Xiao Hong, who were loyal to her. She is bright, gentle and innocent, hence earning the trust and protections of her companions. Ah Yuan's hobbies were eating, and searching for unique things to play with. She eventually learns that she is a fragment of the Zhao Ming sword, and wanders the world together with Xia Yize.
Xie Yi / Chu Qi	Zhao Ling	Master of Yan Magic, Liu Yue City's Priest of Po Jun (Broken Army). Disciple of Shen Ye. He is intelligent and possesses eidetic memory, and a love for research/discovering new things. 122 years ago, Xie Yi gets into a conflict with Chen Ye regarding the survival of their tribe, and left Liu Yue City. He wandered the world, looking for the ideal solution to save his tribe while not harming the Underworld. Along the way, his Yan magic benefited countless. Hundred years before, he was captured by Shen Ye while searching for the fragments of the Zhao Ming sword, and was gravely injured. Chen Ye then used the dummy Xie Yi created to assume Xie Yi's identity and preserve the Yan Magic. Hundred years later, the re-constructed Xie Yi meets Yue Wuyi and took him in as his disciple. However, the current Xie Yi only retains some of his memories. Chu Qi is the reconstructed soul of Xie Yi. Chen Ye destroyed his memory, and used dummies and ancient bugs to extend his life, and changed his name to Chu Qi. He was created as a puppet for Chen Ye to use as a murdering tool.
Shen Ye	Wu Lei	The grand priest of Liu Yue City. In order to ensure the continuity of Liu Yue City's bloodline, he has no choice but to join forces with his heart's demon Li Ying, helping him to absorb the Underworld's Seven Emotions and raise his cultivation. To repay him, Li Ying promised Shen Ye to imbue the Lie Shan tribe with demonic aura, hence allowing them to possess survival abilities. In the end, Shen Ye realized his wrongdoings, and saved the tribe by getting the people to escape to Long Bing Island. Together with Yue Wuyi and company, he uses the power of the Zhao Ming sword and killed Li Ying, and shortly died after.

=== Key characters ===
Character	Voice	Introduction
Li Ying		A heart demon existing within Chen Ye. Cruel and deceptive, he swallows thoughts and emotions to increase his demon power. He joined forces with Chen Ye, causing pain and destruction to the mortal realm.
Yu Qi		The sword spirit of Han Guang. He was the creator of the immortal Zhao Ming and Han Guang sword, but evolved into a spirit to protect HYan Guang. He saved Yue Wuyi and company from dangers multiple times. Eventually, he merged with the Zhao Ming sword and becomes one with it.
Cang Ming		The current chief of Liu Yue City. A beautiful and strong woman. She was trapped within Ju Mu's branch for many years, and uses the power of her soul to evolve into a spiritual butterfly. In order to trap the demon Li Ying, Cang Ming exhausted all her powers and was ultimately destroyed.
Hua Yue		Liu Yue City's Priest of Lian Zhen. From young, she was chosen by the previous grand priest to stay by Shen Ye's side as his assistant and childhood play mate. She is the highest ranked priest in Liu Yue city, and Shen Ye's most trusted confidante.
Shen Xi		Shen Ye's younger sister, who possesses a beautiful appearance. In order to save Cang Ming, she was punished by her father and used as an experimental tool, trapped inside Ju Mu. She was affected by the Immortal's blood, causing her body to never be able to grow. Every other three days, her memory would disappear. During the battle between Yue Wuyi and Li Ying, she was possessed by the latter, causing her to be killed by Shen Ye.
Tong		Liu Yue City's Priest of Qi Sha (Seven Murder), who lives in seclusion. He is interested in learning about the arts of healing, and often carries out his experiments on Shen Ye's prisoners. Though he is a healer, he is not very devoted in rescuing patients, but rather he aims to discover the origins of things.
Feng Ya		Liu Yue City's Priest of Tan Lang (Greedy Wolf). His ability is to control and command magic puppets made out of living people, and is skilled in Dark Magic. An evil, calculative and vengeful person, who is later killed by Chu Qi.
Yu Feng		Liu Yue City's Priest of Ju Men (Huge Door), Cang Ming's cousin. An arrogant, narcissistic and cruel person. He tries to attack Yue Wuyi and company, but is killed by Xie Yi.
Yue Shaocheng		A general of Yan Dynasty who becomes a commerce after retirement. His hobby is to collect swords. Father of Yue Wuyi, he is gentle and warm toward his son, and often spoils him.
Fu Qingjiao		Descendant of the Jiang Yan female tribe, who has a flair for both Yan Magic and Taoism. While on a mission, she meets Yue Shaocheng. She was not attracted to him initially, as she felt that he was too gentle. However after witnessing Shaocheng handle a dangerous situation with calm and compose, she was taken aback and from then on, falls in love with him.
An Ni Wa Er		Leader of the Eastern Wolf Tribe, also known as "Wolf King". He is the son of Wu Huo Luo, great general of Juan Du.
Reverent Qing Zhen		Xia Yize's teacher, Mt. Taihua's chief. He is also good friends with Emperor Shengyuan, father of Xia Yize.
Yi Qing		Xia Yize's junior. She could not stand Xia Yize's heartlessness toward her junior, and thus adopted the alias "Hong You Tian Xiang", spreading misinformation about Xia Yize's flirtatious nature.
Emperor Shengyuan		Xia Yize's father. He becomes the Emperor after eliminating a group of demons.
Xia Hongshan		Xia Yize's mother, a mermaid residing at the Ming Zhu Sea. She saved Emperor multiple times, and falls in love with him.

== Gameplay ==
Players control the main characters as they travel around ancient China and complete missions. The game has a main storyline and side quests, which objectives are usually for players to obtain certain items, travel to specific areas or kill monsters. The main quests allow the player to proceed onto the next stage and continue with the storyline, while the side quests serve mainly to give insights to the history and personality of non-player characters and provide information about skills. Players interact with notice boards in villages to accept missions, collect points and compete in the rankings.

When players encounter an enemy in the game's overworld, they are taken to a separate arena to fight enemies in real time. Characters in the player's party gain combat experience to level up, and can gain extra rewards during a "perfect battle". Characters in the party fight as a team, with the player controlling one while the others are controlled by artificial intelligence.

The weapons inside the game have experience values. Combined with specific items, the level of the weapon can be raised. Magic stones can be collected throughout the game to increase the weapons' value or alter their visual appearance; as well as be used for recovery attack. Players can collect recipes and cook food, or if failed, achieve a special effect or item. In the game, each player has a piece of land which is their "home", where they can plant items, enjoy the hot spring, and decorate the buildings with furniture. Players can also dig for treasures which serve as additional elements of storytelling.

== Adaptations ==
=== Film ===
A film adaptation titled Legend of the Ancient Sword and produced by Alibaba Pictures and directed by Renny Harlin was released in October 2018. It stars Taiwanese singer Leehom Wang, Victoria Song, Godfrey Gao, Karena Ng and Archie Kao.

=== Television ===
The game has been adapted into a drama series, starring Fu Xinbo, Ying Er and Aarif Lee, which aired in July 2018.
