= Legend of the Ancient Sword =

2018 Chinese film

- Chinese film poster
- Directed by: Renny Harlin
- Screenplay by: Tan Guangyuan
- Based on: Gu Jian Qi Tan 2
- Produced by: Defu Jiang; Kailuo Liu; Yan Lu; Yang Lu; Xianming Meng; Nicolas Zhi Qi; YaNan Wang; Hai Yang; Ben Zhang; Haiyan Zhang
- Starring: Leehom Wang; Victoria Song; Godfrey Gao; Karena Ng
- Music by: Lasse Enersen
- Production company: Alibaba Pictures
- Distributed by: Alibaba Pictures
- Release date: 1 October 2018
- Running time: 105 minutes
- Country: China
- Language: Mandarin

Legend of the Ancient Sword (Chinese: 古剑奇谭之流月昭明) is a Chinese fantasy-adventure-action film directed by Renny Harlin and based on the video game Gu Jian Qi Tan 2. The film was released worldwide on October 1, 2018.

== Plot ==
Due to a fateful occurrence, Yue Wuyi leaves home. He meets revered master Xie Yi, who imparts to him the magical arts of Yan, and thus begins his journey of cultivation. Along the way he meets Wen Renyu, Xia Yize, Ah Ruan and company. They discover the schemes and conspiracies of Shen Ye, the grand priest of Liu Yue City. The group of adventurers undergoes dangers to defeat Shen Ye and prevent a disaster from befalling the world.

== Cast ==
- Leehom Wang as Yue Wuyi
  - Wu Jiacheng as Young Yue Wuyi
- Victoria Song as Wen Renyu
- Godfrey Gao as Xia Yize
- Karena Ng as Ah Ruan
- Archie Kao as Xie Yi
- Julian Cheung as Chen Ye
- Ada Liu as Cang Ming
- Li Yan as Nu Nu

== Production ==
Principal photography began in December 2016 and wrapped up in March 2017.

== Reception ==
The film was a box office disaster during China's golden week of cinema. It attracted widespread derision online and only grossed US$1.25m despite a government mandate to screen the film nationwide.
