= E-League (Australia) =

Esports league and an Australian television show

E-League Australia
- Most recent season or competition: 2024
- Founded: January 2018; 8 years ago
- No. of teams: 12 (24 players total)
- Countries: Australia; New Zealand
- Continent: Oceania
- Most titles: Sydney FC (2 titles)
- Broadcaster: Twitch
- Website: e-league

E-League is an esports league and Australian television show. It was announced in January 2018 as a partnership with Fox Sports and Twitch. Currently, the competition is broadcast only on Twitch on the official E-League channel.

== Competition rules and format ==
Each club is represented by two competitors in the E-League (one in each division). As of 2024, there will be five regular "matchdays", and competitors will play best-of-one games in all phases, including the playoffs and final match. The top eight players in the main division will advance to the playoffs, and the bottom four will play against the top four players from the lower "Challenger" division in what is called the "Gauntlet". The two best players in the Gauntlet will also advance to the playoffs for a total of 10 final competitors.

The playoff round is played in a double-elimination format, and will determine four finalists who will ultimately compete for two spots in the final.

The grand final is a one-off match (unless there is a bracket reset; if a player from the lower bracket wins, the game is re-played), with the winner receiving a cash prize along with an invitation to the EA SPORTS FC Pro World Championships.

== Current competitors ==
Club	Competitors	
Club	E-League	Challenger
Adelaide United	(Australia) Mattbro27	(Australia) Juancini
Brisbane Roar	(Australia) vNuggzy	(Australia) Redcap
Central Coast Mariners	(Australia) Patty	(Australia) Nickstav
Macarthur FC	(Australia) Fadi	(Australia) Brady Carr
Melbourne City	(Australia) Mark11	(Australia) MateoJR
Melbourne Victory	(Australia) Sesto	(Australia) Bilzagamus
Newcastle Jets	(New Zealand) Noahja	(Australia) Daman
Perth Glory	(Australia) Naylor	(Australia) Mystaboom
Sydney FC	(Australia) Dylan Campbell	(Brazil) LuanPiuga
Wellington Phoenix	(New Zealand) JMKKing	(New Zealand) Airbrn
Western Sydney Wanderers	(Australia) Negede	(Australia) Eagarx
Western United	(Australia) Saad	(Australia) HarrisonJH

== Winners ==
Season	Premiers	Champions	Grand Final		
Season	Premiers	Champions	Winner	Score	Runner-up
2018	Sydney FC	Sydney FC	(Australia) Samer96_ (Sydney FC)	6–1	(Australia) Joshingwood (Melbourne City)
2019	Melbourne Victory	Sydney FC	(Australia) Marko (Sydney FC)	1–0	(Australia) Marcus Gomes (Melbourne City)
2020	Sydney FC	Sydney FC	(Australia) Marko (Sydney FC)	2–1	(Australia) AussieFifaHD (Brisbane Roar)
2021	Newcastle Jets	Not awarded	Not played		
2022	—	Western United	(Australia) Dylan (Western United)	5–2	(Australia) MikeJ (Newcastle Jets)
2023	—	Western Sydney Wanderers	(Australia) Mark11 (Western Sydney Wanderers)	5–0	(Australia) ANezer (Western Sydney Wanderers)
2024	—	Melbourne City	(Australia) Mark11 (Melbourne City)	2–1 (first match) 5–1 (bracket reset)	(Australia) Dylan Campbell (Sydney FC)
