= Gujian 3 =

2018 video game

Swords of Legends 3
- Developer: Aurogon
- Designer: Shao Yun
- Artist: Zheng Wen
- Writer: Shao Yun
- Composer: Joe Chou
- Series: Gujian
- Engine: Havok Vision Engine
- Platform: Microsoft Windows
- Release: Microsoft Windows; December 14, 2018
- Genre: Action role-playing
- Mode: Single-player

Gujian 3 (古剑奇谭三 in Chinese, Swords of Legends 3) is an action role-playing game developed by Aurogon Info & Tech, a subsidiary of Wangyuan Shengtang. The third installment of the Gujian series, it was released on December 14, 2018, on Microsoft Windows.

== Setting and gameplay ==
The game's monsters were inspired by Chinese mythology, and many of the in-game locations are based on photographs and descriptions of historic sites. Gujian 3 brings a more free and smooth combat experience to the series with its real-time combat system. The game has been described as using xianxia motifs to create an action RPG “that often comes close to feeling like a Chinese take on The Witcher”.

== Release and reception ==
On August 20, 2018, a trailer and demo were released. Gujian3 was released December 14, 2018 on Microsoft Windows. A year later, a version of the game with English subtitles was released. In July 2020 it was announced that the game sold over 1.3 million copies.
