= Past Cure =

2018 video game

- Developer: Phantom 8 Studio
- Publisher: Phantom 8 Studio
- Engine: Unreal Engine 4
- Platforms: Microsoft Windows; PlayStation 4 Xbox One
- Release: 23 February 2018
- Genre: Action

Past Cure is an action video game developed by German indie developer Phantom 8. In the game the player controls Ian, a former elite soldier, who has undergone military experiments and tries to uncover his past. Past Cure was released on 23 February 2018 for Windows, PlayStation 4 and Xbox One.

== Gameplay ==
Past Cure is an action indie video game. Played from a third-person perspective, the player controls Ian, a former elite soldier. Ian sets out to uncover the truth about military experiments that were done to him, which gave him special powers. Abilities include the power to slow time and astral projection. Ian, assisted by his brother, also tries to master his abilities. Ian goes to the criminal underworld where he uses his special powers to survive. However, every time he uses his powers, his mind becomes more detached from reality.

== Development ==
Simon Gerdesmann, managing director of Phantom 8, said the idea to develop a game started from a pitch from a friend. While hesitant at first, he later decided to develop the game. The development started in March 2016 with three video game developers; later the team expanded to six members in the middle of the development stage and by the end had grown to eight members. Simon said that because of the eight people on the team, the studio was called Phantom 8. The studio is an international team, with people from Turkey, Belgium, Egypt, Romania, England and North Macedonia. The game is built in Unreal Engine 4. The inspirations for the game were Silent Hill and Metal Gear Solid.

== Reception ==
=== Critical response ===
Reception

Aggregate score
Aggregator	Score
Metacritic	(PC) 48/100 (PS4) 37/100 (XONE) 34/100

Review scores
Publication	Score
Computer Games Magazine	2/10
Destructoid	2/10
IGN	5.8/10
Push Square	3/10

Review aggregator Metacritic calculated an average score of 37 out of 100, based on 22 reviews, indicating "generally unfavorable reviews".

John Cal McCormick of the Push Square said that the game is bad, and he further elaborated that, "But it's also the best kind of bad game, in that it's not for a lack of effort or that the team were bereft of ideas that the finished product doesn't come together". Makedonski of the Destructoid wrote that, "This is a game that is flawed to its core. The mangled story and shoddy design prevent any single aspect from ever sticking out as something special. Don't even risk taking a bargain bin flier on this one. You'll only end up frustrating yourself".

Jon Denton of Trusted Reviews wrote, "Past Cure has a much lower budget than most action games, and it's refreshing that the team didn't use crowdfunding to get their project off the ground". Chandler Wood of the PlayStation LifeStyle wrote that the voice actors of the game were uninterested in delivering their lines, he further explained that, "There were numerous places where I felt that my Google Assistant's voice would do a better job at reading the lines than the voice actors did".

=== Accolades ===
Year	Award	Category	Result	Refs.
2017	Game Connection	People's Choice Award	Won	
2017	Game Connection	Best Hardcore Game	Nominated	
2017	Game Connection	Best Indie Game	Nominated	
2017	Game Connection	Most Original Game	Nominated	
2017	White Nights Conference	Best Storytelling	Won	
