= The Persistence =

2018 video game

- Developer: Firesprite
- Publisher: Firesprite
- Director: Stuart Tilley
- Designer: Alex Moore
- Programmer: Tom Vernon
- Artist: Lee Carus
- Writers: Chris Bateman; Niki Smith
- Composers: John Sanderson; Alistair Kerley; Santino Browne
- Engine: Unreal Engine 4
- Platforms: PlayStation 4; Windows; Nintendo Switch; Xbox One; PlayStation 5; Xbox Series X/S
- Release: PlayStation 4; 24 July 2018; Windows, Switch, Xbox One; 21 May 2020; Enhanced; 4 June 2021
- Genre: Survival horror
- Mode: Single-player

The Persistence is a 2018 virtual reality survival horror video game developed and published by Firesprite for the PlayStation 4. It was originally released for the system's virtual reality headset PlayStation VR. A version with support for conventional controls was released for Windows, Nintendo Switch, Xbox One in May 2020; an Enhanced version of the game was released for Windows, PlayStation 5 and Xbox Series X and Series S in June 2021. It is the only game developed by Firesprite to appear on Nintendo and Xbox consoles, as the studio was closely associated with Sony Interactive Entertainment, who later acquired the studio as part of PlayStation Studios.

== Gameplay ==
The Persistence is a first-person survival horror game. The game is set onboard The Persistence, a stranded spaceship in the year 2521. The player assumes control of a clone of security officer Zimri Eder. She is tasked to reactivate the ship's stardrive in order to escape while fighting mutated clones which have occupied the ship. Stealth is encouraged, though the player also has access to several weapons, including but not limited to a taser gun named the Harvester, a gravity gun named the Gravometric Hook, as well as items such as Ivy Serum which temporarily turns an enemy into an ally. The game also features elements commonly found in roguelike games. The player needs to complete tasks on each of the four ship decks, though the ship layout, which is procedurally generated, changes whenever the player uses a teleporter. As the player explores the ship, they will find FAB chips, which can be used to unlock weapon upgrades, and stem cells, which can grant the player passive perks such as increased health or enhanced strength. Whenever the player dies, they will respawn as another clone of Zimri Eder. A companion app for iOS and Android was released alongside the game, which allows up to four players to influence how the game plays out by either helping or hindering a player's progress.

== Development ==
The game was developed by UK-based developer Firesprite. The studio was inspired by sci-fi classics including Alien, as well as games such as Dead Space and System Shock. Stories of Your Life and Others, a collection of short stories by American writer Ted Chiang, was also a major source of inspiration. Development of the game first started in early 2015. The studio used their experience developing The Playroom and The Playroom VR to understand how social play and interaction worked when they were developing the companion app. Firesprite chose Unreal Engine 4 as the game's engine because it allowed the team to prototype and experiment with different gameplay mechanics quickly.

Firesprite officially announced the game in March 2017. It was initially released for virtual reality headset PlayStation VR exclusively on July 24, 2018. A modified version of the game, which allows players to play the game without using any VR headset, was released on 21 May 2020 for PC, PS4, Xbox One and Nintendo Switch. The Persistence Enhanced was released for PC, PlayStation 5 and Xbox Series X and Series S on 4 June 2021. Players who owned the game on PS4, Xbox One or PC will be able to upgrade their game at no additional cost.

== Reception ==
According to review aggregator website Metacritic, the PC version of the game received generally positive reviews based on 4 reviews, while the PlayStation 5 version received "mixed or average" reviews based on 5 reviews. Ian Higton, reviewing the PSVR version, described the game as "an ideal purchase for VR horror fans", and remarked that the game, with its roguelike elements, "offers way more in terms of gameplay" when compared with other VR titles in the market. Sammy Barker from Push Square, reviewing the PS5 version of the game, also liked the roguelike elements and the game's sense of progression, though noted that some of the systems "feel odd outside of VR".
