= Just Cause (video game series) =

Action-adventure video game series

- Logo since 2018
- Genres: Action-adventure, third-person shooter
- Developer: Avalanche Studios
- Publishers: Square Enix (2010-2018); Eidos Interactive (2006–2009)
- Platforms: Microsoft Windows; PlayStation 2 PlayStation 3 PlayStation 4 Xbox; Xbox 360; Xbox One
- First release: Just Cause; September 22, 2006
- Latest release: Just Cause 4 December 4, 2018

Just Cause is an action-adventure video game series created by Avalanche Studios. Originally published by Eidos Interactive and after 2009 by Square Enix's External Studios. The series consists of Just Cause, Just Cause 2, Just Cause 3, and Just Cause 4. The games are open world and take place in islands and archipelagos. Each game in the series tasks the player to overthrow the governing body of the game's setting. By May 2019, the series had shipped over 26 million copies worldwide.

The series directly draws its name from the real-life United States invasion of Panama, code-named "Operation Just Cause".

== Overview ==
Each installment in the series takes place on a different fictional island nation, where the player plays the character Rico Rodriguez, a secret agent who originally hails from the fictional nation of Medici (featured in the third game). On foot, Rico can walk, swim, jump, and operate weapons. Players can also take control of vehicles found in the world and perform stunts while driving them. From the second game onwards, players can also utilize Rico's parachute and grappling hook to travel around the map, with the third game introducing a wingsuit for further movement options.

During the game, the player is given a main storyline as well as several side missions. Side missions may include liberating a village or taking over a drug cartel's villa. In Just Cause, these side missions are repetitive but necessary to gain points with certain factions. In Just Cause 2, the side missions became unique and more complex.

When not playing story or side missions, the player can roam freely in the open world. However, committing certain aggressive acts will attract a "heat" level (similar to Grand Theft Auto's wanted level), which will then increase the strength and number of enemy NPCs spawned seeking to kill the player.

== Games ==
Release timeline
2006	Just Cause
2007–2009
2010	Just Cause 2
2011–2014
2015	Just Cause 3
2016–2017
2018	Just Cause 4

=== Just Cause (2006) ===
Just Cause is the first game in the Just Cause series, released on September 22, 2006. It is set on the fictional island nation of San Esperito (inspired by the Caribbean) and follows the protagonist Rico Rodriguez as he attempts to overthrow the corrupt government. The game combines a third-person perspective with a large open-world environment, offering the player freedom to explore all 250K acres of the island and engage in both main and side missions.

The gameplay involves Rico using a variety of weapons, equipment (Grappling hook), vehicles (cars, boats, airplanes, helicopters, and motorcycles), and unique features like parasailing (where Rico grapples onto moving vehicles while using a parachute) and skydiving to help complete missions. Combat gameplay involves both firearms and melee combat mechanics, while stunt-based gameplay became a signature feature of side missions.

=== Just Cause 2 (2010) ===
Released on March 23, 2010 (in Europe on March 26, 2010), Just Cause 2 builds on the foundation set by its predecessor, expanding both gameplay mechanics and the open world. Set in the fictional Southeast Asian archipelago of Panau, ruled by dictator Pandak "Baby" Panay, the game introduces more dynamic and varied mission structures, moving beyond the repetitive format of the first installment. Rico’s grappling hook received significant upgrades, allowing for more creative uses like attaching enemies to objects or tethering vehicles together.

The game received praise for its massive open-world map, covering over 1,085.70 square kilometers (400 square miles) of diverse environments, including deserts, tropical forests, and snowy mountains. Just Cause 2 was also well received for its explosive action and sandbox-style gameplay, encouraging player experimentation with destruction and traversal mechanics more than its predecessor. Just Cause 2 also featured a large modding community on PC.

Initially set to be released in 2008, it was delayed multiple times until it was released in North America on March 23, 2010.

=== Just Cause 3 (2015) ===
Released worldwide on December 1, 2015, Just Cause 3 takes place on the fictional Mediterranean island of Medici, where the protagonist Rico Rodriguez returns to overthrow the ruthless dictator General Di Ravello. The game offers a map almost the same size as Just Cause 2 but with less diverse terrains than its predecessor. Just Cause 3 also introduces a wingsuit, allowing players to traverse the landscape in new ways.

The main storyline is shorter than that of Just Cause 2, but the game does not feature faction side-missions, replacing them with 'random encounters' and a greater variety of races and other challenges.

=== Just Cause 4 (2018) ===
Just Cause 4 is the latest PC and console game in the Just Cause series, released on December 4, 2018. The game is set in the fictional South American country of Solís. The new dynamic weather systems expand upon the function of the wingsuit introduced in Just Cause 3 and are the focus of the storyline.

In comparison to Just Cause 3, the map is much larger and more diverse, however, the removal of its liberation mechanic does reduce the need to visit large portions of the map.

=== Just Cause Mobile (cancelled) ===
Just Cause Mobile was officially announced by Square Enix during The Game Awards for iOS and Android mobile devices. It is a free-to-play action shooter game set in the Just Cause universe featuring single-player and multiplayer four player co-op and PvP gameplay for up to thirty players. While the console and PC games are third-person affairs, the mobile take on the franchise will feature a top-down isometric perspective. It received an early access release in Singapore in November 2021. The game was scheduled to globally release in 2022. It was cancelled in July 2023.

=== Future ===
In November 2025, Avalanche co-founder Christofer Sundberg stated on X that he believed that Just Cause 5 will not release in the near future. In June 2025, MP1st reported a former Sumo Digital employee stated on LinkedIn that Just Cause 5 was cancelled.

== Reception ==
The Just Cause series has received a mixed reception from critics, but audiences generally have given the series a positive reception. Critics and audiences alike praise the series for its innovative gameplay, open-world design, set-pieces and non-linear approach to mission structure, however it is generally criticised for its generic storyline and cliché characters.

== Film adaptation ==
In 2010, it was reported that a film adaptation of Just Cause, titled Just Cause: Scorpion Rising, was in production, written by comic book writer Bryan Edward Hill. Nothing came of these plans, and Hill's Just Cause: Scorpion Rising was never produced.

In 2015, Adrian Askarieh, producer of the Hitman films, stated that he hoped to oversee a shared universe of Square Enix films with Just Cause, Hitman, Tomb Raider, Deus Ex, and Thief, but admitted that he does not have the rights to Tomb Raider. He also stated, at that time, that the latest outlook for the Just Cause film was that it would be based on the third release of the video game series. In May 2017, the Game Central reporters at Metro UK suggested that the shared universe was unlikely, pointing out that no progress had been made on any Just Cause, Deus Ex nor Thief films.

In March 2017, it was announced that Jason Momoa would play Rico Rodriguez and Brad Peyton would direct the film. As of April 2018, Peyton admitted that no script existed yet, and that he and Momoa already had full schedules well into 2019. On May 21, 2019, it was announced that Derek Kolstad would write the script. On July 15, 2020, it was announced that Michael Dowse would direct the film, which was set to be produced by Constantin Film and Askarieh's Prime Universe.

In May 2024, it was announced that Ángel Manuel Soto would direct the film, with Story Kitchen's Dmitri M. Johnson, Michael Lawrence Goldberg, and Timothy I. Stevenson producing alongside 87North's David Leitch & Kelly McCormick with Universal Pictures distributing. In January 2025, it was announced that Aaron Rabin had been hired to pen the screenplay.

== See also ==
- Operation "Just Cause"
- List of Square Enix video game franchises
