= Characters of Dragon Age: Inquisition =

From left to right: Cullen, Vivienne, Varric, Cole, Solas, Cassandra, the Inquisitor (customizable), Iron Bull, Dorian, Leliana, Sera, Josephine (unused hairstyle), Blackwall.

Dragon Age: Inquisition, the third main video game in BioWare's Dragon Age series, is the most successful video game launch in BioWare history based on units sold. The game features a large number of characters who are members or potential allies of the organization known as the Inquisition; its formation was sanctioned by Divine Justinia V of the Andrastrian Chantry, the dominant religious organization in the Dragon Age series, prior to the events of Inquisition. The organization's primary purpose is to restore order to the continent of Thedas, the setting of Inquisition, where civil unrest and civil wars have already plunged entire nations and societies across the known world into chaos. A supernatural calamity in the beginning of Inquisition led to the deaths of the Divine and the majority of the Chantry leadership, and the subsequent opening of a mysterious metaphysical tear in the sky called the "Breach", which is unleashing dangerous demons upon the world and sends Thedas deeper into crisis.

The characters of Inquisition were created and written by a team of writers employed by BioWare, led by lead writer David Gaider. The leader of the Inquisition is the "Inquisitor", whose race and gender is chosen by the player. The Inquisitor has a glowing "mark" on their hand which is capable of closing the Breach, and is viewed by some Theodosians as the "chosen one" of their revered prophet Andraste. The Inquisition eventually discovers the true enemy behind much of the chaos: Corypheus, a returning villain from the Dragon Age II downloadable content (DLC) pack, Legacy. The conflict between the Inquisition and Corypheus' forces forms the core narrative of Inquisition.

The Inquisitor is supported by several "companions", or party members, who join the Inquisition to stop the demons that have invaded the world of Thedas. Several characters, such as Morrigan and Leliana, return from previous games in the series, and two of the companions have previously appeared in the second game. Nine companions appear in all: Cassandra Pentaghast, Varric Tethras, Solas, Vivienne, Sera, Iron Bull, Blackwall, Dorian Pavus, and Cole. Inquisition features eight possible romance options; six of them are party companions, the remainder are two of the three non-playable characters who serve as the Inquisitor's advisors. The advisors assist the Inquisitor by planning operations and handling situations across southern Thedas; in gameplay terms, these generally lead to rewards and often deeper explorations of plot and lore.

Inquisition's cast of characters is noted for its diversity and have received generally positive reviews from gaming magazines and websites.

== Concept and design ==
The setting of Inquisition is a world that has been described as a dark fantasy setting, and events primarily occur within the Theodosian nations of Ferelden and Orlais; a significant focus of the narrative is character-driven, and revolves around how its characters deal with the weight of cataclysmic destruction and carry on through hardship.

The creation process for Inquisition's characters each began with a concept artist, who was supplied with a very short blurb by the writers, rather than being written in advance. This was done in order to keep the concept artists from always having to "play catch-up". After several initial stages of visualization, the character is refined through a collaborative process until the details are just right. For example, senior artist for Inquisition Rion Swanson recalled that a lot of "back-and-forth" had occurred to ensure that the character of Vivienne met the studio's quality standards, and that BioWare's concept artists were instrumental in locking down her final design.

For Inquisition, they wanted the characters to be more recognizable, and BioWare stated they preferred "realistic" characters over "the embodiment of perfection". In deciding the cast for their games, Mike Laidlaw commented that BioWare looks at its major themes, and uses the party members to help pose "high-level questions" to the player and allow them to humanise issues. BioWare tries to create a party dynamic. Mark Darrah, the game's executive producer, noted that generally they tried to balance the characters between the classes, genders, romance options, and other things.

Several characters from previous Dragon Age games return in Inquisition. It was important that any returning characters made sense. Darrah commented that they were unlikely to reuse any previous romance options as companions due to the "baggage" that comes with them, though they could appear in cameos. He gave one reason that a character might return is an incomplete arc, pointing to Isabela's return in Dragon Age II. Unlike the previous Dragon Age games, no DLC companion was ever planned for Inquisition. Creative director Mike Laidlaw commented how due to the nature of their companions part of the DLC companion had to be on the disc, and some controversy was caused by players believing they were paying for companions they already owned.

Gaider acknowledged in a BioWare forum post uploaded in January 2014 that the company's video games have become known for its optional romantic side story content. He claimed that characters, not the story, is what BioWare does best as they are often "done to a level that few other games even attempt, with an element of agency that strikes a chord in our players", and highlighted romances as a "natural outgrowth" of their work in developing these characters. Gaider noted there would an "inevitable reaction" from disappointed fans when the romance options in Dragon Age: Inquisition are revealed, and that the developers expected to receive a hostile reception from certain players who may feel slighted for any number of reasons as they could not please everybody. In spite of this, he said that a significant number of players have consistently expressed their enjoyment of the romance content, and expressed doubt that BioWare would stop developing romantic side content altogether in their future games as it has become a signature aspect of the company's creative output.

The characters were made before deciding who the romance options will be, and how many options there are; this is in order to ensure the characters are built-up and "real" first. The developers try to balanced making the romances nuanced while not spending too much time developing "essentially optional" content. The romances in Inquisition tried to explore new ground rather than repeat narratives seen in earlier romances. Unlike previous games, Inquisition is said to favor event-driven content over approval ratings. Romances can vary between falling for heated rival or "fooling around with a friend", depending on the player's choices, in addition to the more traditional route of falling in love. The sex scenes in Inquisition are intended to be more "mature and tasteful", with cinematic director Jonathan Perry noting that controversy wasn't just a matter of concern, but also a limit on budget and the expense of animation fidelity. The developers wanted to focus not on the sex itself, but rather on that it was "the culmination of spending a lot of time with a character and getting to know them".

To help cosplayers, fan-artists, and others, BioWare released character reference kits that detail their costumes. The first one released was Morrigan.

== The Inquisitor ==
Concept for the Inquisitor. The main character's look took long to design and was hotly debated.

Voiced by: Harry Hadden-Paton and Alix Wilton Regan (British accents); Jon Curry and Sumalee Montano (American accents)

The player character of the game, the Inquisitor is the sole survivor when a giant Fade tear called "the Breach" erupts over a peace conclave between leaders of the Chantry, rebel mages from the former Circles of Magi, and the Templar Order. The character is initially known as the Herald of Andraste, after eyewitness accounts of a feminine entity believed to be Andraste who was seen with the survivor when they escaped from the Fade through a dimensional rift. The Herald becomes part of a reformed version of the historical Inquisition, tasked with stopping the Fade tears and investigating their source. After closing the Breach and facing the Elder One, they are placed as the Inquisitor, head of the Inquisition. The Inquisitor is customizable, with the player given the choice over their gender, class (mage, rogue or warrior), race, and voice set. Most of their responses are controlled by the player through a dialogue wheel.

With the Dragon Age series, developers wished to focus more on the world than build an arc around a single protagonist. Mark Darrah noted how Hawke, the protagonist of Dragon Age II, was "really a leaf in the wind", and contrasted them against the Inquisitor, acting on the world instead of reacting to the world "pushing down on you".

Although BioWare initially stated that the Inquisitor would be human-only, it was later announced that their race is customizable, much like the silent protagonists of Origins. In addition to being able to be a human, dwarf or elf, Inquisition also introduces the option for the player to make their Inquisitor a "Qunari", a large horned race. The developers wanted there to be some sort of significant impact to the player's choices, both from characters and the storyline.

The Inquisitor has two different voices for each gender, with the choice between either a British or an American accent. Alix Wilton Regan, provider of the Inquisitor's British female accent, believed there should be a sense of "strength, authority" to the Inquisitor, and so used a more "chesty" voice instead of more high and in the throat. Regan has said she is proud to be voicing a female protagonist for BioWare, focusing on the importance of inclusion.

As the warrior class had been the signature Warden in Origins and the mage the signature class of Hawke in II, for Inquisition artists experimented more with how a rogue would look in a position of power. Many different archetypes were used, and as directions began emerging the artists tried to ensure designs would translate across gender and class. They wished for all the Inquisitor's design elements to be interchangeable, allowing them then to make armor based on specific classes, factions or races in the knowledge they would fit with other clothing. The designs of the rank-and-file Inquisition forces were made in tandem, and allowed them then to refine the visuals for each possible class. The Inquisitor's helmet, considered to be a "first face" of the protagonist, went through the most different designs.

== Companions ==
=== Cassandra Pentaghast ===
Voiced by: Miranda Raison

Cassandra is a member of the Seekers of Truth and the former Right Hand of the Divine. She first appeared in Dragon Age II, where she interrogates Varric Tethras about Hawke, the Champion of Kirkwall. By Inquisition, she is one of the few Seekers remaining loyal to Divine Justinia V, after the Order formally broke away from the Andrastrian Chantry along with the Templar Order. As a co-founder of the Inquisition, she invoked the Divine's writ to reform the organization and was heavily involved with the fledgling organization's decision-making. Should the player play as a male Inquisitor, she is a romance option for all races.

Cassandra is described by Bioware as the "Believer" in promotional materials for Inquisition. Cassandra's specialization is "Templar", based around nullifying magical effects, fighting demons, and providing support and buffs for other party members.

In Inquisition, the character was originally written by Jennifer Hepler, and Gaider took up the character after Hepler left the company. BioWare wanted returning characters to make sense, and had to ask questions like "How did they grow? How did they change in the intervening years?" Gaider noted that "what we find in Inquisition is a Cassandra who's realizing the world doesn't work like she believed it does", saying that she is walking a path of doubt. In contrast to Dragon Age II, Cassandra's voice actress Miranda Raison commented that the character in Inquisition has a more human, if "not exactly softer", side to her, and called her "angrier" in the second game.

=== Varric Tethras ===
Voiced by: Brian Bloom

Varric is a surface dwarf and former companion of the Champion of Kirkwall in Dragon Age II. Wallace, again writing for Game Informer, was excited for Varric's return, noting his wild stories, intriguing past, funny banter, and wondering if, like with Hawke, Varric would still always have your back. Varric is described by Bioware as the "Storyteller" in promotional materials for Inquisition. In late 2014, Varric was featured prominently in a cinematic trailer promoting the release of Inquisition, which was uploaded on multiple EA-affiliated channels. Varric's specialization is "Artificer", based on making mechanical traps for enemies and controlling the battlefield to give allies the advantage.

=== Solas ===
Voiced by: Gareth David-Lloyd

Solas is an elven mage apostate and expert on the Fade. Solas is one of the few mandatory companions whom the player meets early in the game and Solas will not leave the Inquisition even if he greatly disapproves of the inquisitor and his or her decisions. As a companion he offers opinions and information that are unique and sometimes clashes with accepted accounts of Thedosian history. His approval generally increases when the player asks questions, is thoughtful, helps the downtrodden, or favors magic and spirits. Solas is a romance option, but is interested only in a female elf player character. Solas is described as "The Mind" in promotional material. Solas' specialization is "Rift Mage", based on weakening enemies and setting up opportunities for allies to exploit.

=== Sera ===
Voiced by: Robyn Addison

Sera is an impulsive rogue and an elven member of the mysterious thieves group, the "Friends of Red Jenny", where she has access to a spy network she can use for the Inquisition, which often includes the eyes and ears of disgruntled servants around Thedas. Sera is a romance option for a female Inquisitor of any race, though she has a preference for dwarves and Qunari. Sera is described as "The Wildcard" in promotional material. Sera's specialization is "Tempest", based on using alchemical mixtures and potions to produce elemental effects for attacks.

=== Vivienne ===
Voiced by: Indira Varma

Vivienne is a Circle mage and mistress of an Orlesian nobleman. As the official enchanter to the Orlesian Imperial Court, Vivienne is often referred to as Madame de Fer, an Orlesian sobriquet which means "the Lady of Iron". She is described as "The Ambition" in promotional material. In late 2014, Vivienne was featured prominently in a cinematic trailer promoting the release of Inquisition, which was uploaded on multiple EA-affiliated channels. Vivienne's specialization is "Knight-Enchanter", which adds a melee ability for mages and provides buffs to magical barriers and close-quarters combat.

=== The Iron Bull ===
Voiced by: Freddie Prinze, Jr.

The Iron Bull is a Qunari warrior, leader of a mercenary company known as the Bull's Chargers, and a Ben-Hassrath agent originally stationed in Orlais, a position that he has become conflicted about since he has become accustomed to life outside of the teachings of the Qun. He is a bisexual romance option for the Inquisitor of any gender or race. He is described as "The Muscle" in promotional material. In late 2014, the Iron Bull was featured prominently in a cinematic trailer promoting the release of Inquisition, which was uploaded on multiple EA-affiliated channels. His specialization is "Reaver", based on sacrificing health to execute devastating attacks and increasing in power as health decreases.

=== Blackwall ===
Voiced by: Alastair Parker

Blackwall is an optional companion, who is first introduced in Inquisition when Leliana asks the Inquisitor to track down a lone Grey Warden who is sighted in the Hinterlands; he is found training villagers near the docks to defend themselves. Blackwall is a potential romance option for a female Inquisitor of any race. He presents himself as the ideal Grey Warden in most things he does or say: this includes the forfeiture of living his own life to serving as one of selfless duty, by fighting against the forces trying to tear down the world. Blackwall is seemingly unaffected by the false calling generated by Corypheus and his demon ally, which has led to the disappearance of many Grey Wardens from the world's affairs.

The designers explored several designs for Blackwall, using a sturdy, weathered warrior to represent an "ideal Warden" of the kind imagined by children hearing heroic stories.

Blackwall is described as "The Resolve" in promotional material. Blackwall's specialization is "Champion", based on providing buffs to guard and protecting allies in battle.

=== Dorian Pavus ===
Voiced by: Ramon Tikaram

Dorian is a Tevinter mage, who joins the Inquisition to oppose the servants of Corypheus, who count many extremist supremacists from his homeland in their number. He is a potential romance option for a male protagonist. Dorian states that he left Tevinter because he'd grown sick of the decadence and corruption prevalent in Imperial society, and believes the Venatori have to be stopped before they drag the Imperium even further into chaos.

Promotional material for Dragon Age: Inquisition describes Dorian as "The Redeemer". Dorian's specialization is "Necromancer", based on reanimating corpses and binding spirits to aid in battle.

=== Cole ===
Voiced by: James Norton

Cole first appeared in the 2011 novel Dragon Age: Asunder as a major character. He is revealed as the mysterious killer known as the Ghost of the White Spire, a tower in Val Royeaux used by the local Circle of Magi and as a templar stronghold. By the end of the story, Cole holds then-Lord Seeker Lambert van Reeves at knifepoint and tells him to "look into his eyes", the same mantra he recited to his other victims, before killing him.

In Inquisition, Cole is first encountered by the player during the Inquisitor's fight with an Envy demon during the main storyline. If recruited, Cole is a rogue assassin who seeks to "heal the hurts" and fix the troubles of people the Inquisitor comes across, including the Inquisitors companions. Many of the companions find that the disappearing and reappearing Cole is unsettling and unnatural, and some even call him a demon. As the story progresses the Inquisitor discovers Cole moving things around without other people's wishes and without their knowledge, does things that are odd or confusing, and some characters cannot recall Cole ever being present at all. Cole is a supernatural creature that can make others forget things, read their minds, and seemingly teleport at will. It is slowly revealed that Cole is most definitely a spirit inhabiting a body, but whose agenda is uncertain. As the Inquisitor and Cole become friendlier and the game advances, Cole becomes more unstable, and eventually asks to be destroyed or bound by blood magic. Solas recommends the player instead gather an amulet that will protect Cole from himself and others who wish to control him. The amulet does not work, and both Varric and Solas put forth recommendations as to what to do with Cole, with Varric wanting Cole to become more human, and Solas wanting him to become truly aware of his spirit nature. The real Cole was an apostate mage that was forgotten and left to starve to death in a tower in Orlais by a templar, and at death was inhabited by a spirit of compassion who is now the current Cole.

Cole is described as "The Spirit" in promotional material. Cole's specialization is "Assassin", based on stealth and surgical strikes on opponents.

== Supporting characters ==
=== Leliana ===
Voiced by: Corinne Kempa

Leliana, also known as Sister Nightingale, is the former Left Hand of the Divine and co-founder of the reformed Inquisition, where she takes on the roles of seneschal and spymaster in the organization. She first appeared as a potential companion of the Hero of Ferelden in Origins, and have made recurring appearances in various Dragon Age franchise media. Unlike her previous appearances, Leliana is presented in Inquisition as a cunning strategist with eyes and ears across Thedas, and she runs a network which collects whispers and secrets to be leveraged to the Inquisition's advantage.

Charter, one of Leliana's subordinates within her espionage network and the commanding officer of Caer Bronach near the village of Crestwood, is rumoured to be an alias of the notorious spy known as "The Black Hart". Charter has appeared in the limited comic series Dragon Age: Magekiller and Dragon Age: Knight Errant as a major character.

=== Cullen ===
Voiced by: Greg Ellis

Cullen Rutherford is a former high-ranking member of the Templar Order and a recurring character in the Dragon Age series. Cullen first appeared as a minor character in Origins, and is given a significant role in Inquisition's narrative due to his increase in popularity with the series' fandom. Cullen is a romance option for a female human or elven Inquisitor.

In Inquisition, he is the military commander of the Inquisition's forces, and serves as tactical advisor to the Inquisitor. Cullen is described as the kind of leader who spends as much time in the dirt with his soldiers as he does in the war room planning their next move. In Inquisition Cullen wears a highly functional complement of armour, which consists plate spaulders, vambraces, breastplate, decorative fur, and an ornate lion-shaped helm which he occasionally wears in the battlefield. The armour includes leather components that grants an adequate degree of agility for the armour bearer to charge all comers with cutting precision. An embellished robe draped around the Commander of the Inquisition's attire is a reminder of his time as a member of the Templar Order, which developed his ability to crush and suppress magic at the cost of developing a dependency on regular and uninterrupted consumption of lyrium.

A number of templars left their Order and followed Cullen into the Inquisition during the organization's early days, including Knight-Captain Rylen of Starkhaven, who later became Cullen's second-in-command and commanding officer of Griffon Wing Keep.

=== Josephine Montilyet ===
Voiced by: Allegra Clark

Lady Josephine Montilyet, nicknamed "Josie" by Leliana, is the Inquisition's ambassador and chief diplomat in charge of maintaining the Inquisition's connections, and one of three advisors to the Inquisitor. She is a romance option for an Inquisitor of any gender or race.

Josephine is the eldest daughter and heir to a noble Antivan family, and she was educated in Val Royeaux, where she built and maintained connections; among them were Leliana, who later recruited her for the Inquisition, and Baron Edouard Desjardins, a family friend of the Montilyets who was enlisted by her to manage the Inquisition's holdings in Orlais' Dales region, including Suledin Keep. Once she finished her schooling, Josephine became the official diplomat to Empress Celene I of Orlais on behalf of King Fulgeno of Antiva. She is presented as a rising star among diplomatic circles, known for being well traveled, familiar with many forms of etiquette, and a skilled negotiator. Her role in Inquisition involves building "relationships with key players across Thedas, for bolstering the Inquisition’s strength requires the help of those in high places", and being the voice of her organization among the influential "when victories and alliances cannot be forged with strategy and sword alone".

Josephine is designed to look constantly ready to meet with even the most venerable dignitaries, and carries an ornate ledger and quill pen to record messages and draft treatises. Her attire is adorned in rich materials of golden silk and patterned velvet, and she wears an ornamented collar which is finished by a brilliant red ruby around her neck, described as "like a drop of Antivan wine in a sunbeam".

=== Scout Harding ===
Voiced by: Ali Hillis

Lace Harding is a surface dwarf who is the lead scout of the Inquisition and holds the rank of lieutenant. She was born just outside of Redcliffe to a seamstress mother and a trader father. Though her mother named her "Lace" in the hopes that her daughter would be as pretty and delicate, Harding quickly proved herself a strong and active child. She helped her elderly neighbor tend to her sheep, which allowed her to explore the hills of the Hinterlands at length. When the Inquisition first began to build a presence in Redcliffe, Harding volunteered to guide the newly arriving Inquisition forces. Eventually, impressed by Harding's skill, Officer Charter recruited Harding to serve as a member of the organization. She quickly became indispensable to the Inquisition thanks to her cunning, daring, and positive outlook.

=== Mother Giselle ===
Voiced by: Sara Powell

A Chantry Revered Mother and early supporter of the Inquisition. She is found aiding refugees fleeing from the Mage-Templar War in the Ferelden Hinterlands early in the game. She offers general advice and moral support for the Inquisitor, and assists in rallying the Inquisition after the organization was forced out of Haven by Corypheus and his forces. She would return to the Chantry to serve under Divine Victoria during the events of the Exalted Council, two years after the defeat of Corypheus.

According to Patrick Weekes, though Mother Giselle has no magic or martial prowess she nevertheless braves the wilds during a war in order to help others, and is in fact "in her own way, one of the most powerful characters in the game."

=== Cremisius "Krem" Aclassi ===
Voiced by: Jennifer Hale

Cremisius Aclassi, better known by his nickname Krem, is a member of the Bull's Chargers mercenary company. Krem is a former Tevinter soldier who fled his homeland after he was caught falsifying personal information about himself on his enlistment documents for the Tevinter military forces. Krem met the Iron Bull in a tavern at a Tevinter border town when Bull intervened to protect Krem from a group of Tevinter soldiers who wanted to execute him for desertion, losing his eye in the process. Bull then offered a position in the Bull's Chargers to Krem, who would go on to become the Iron Bull's second in command.

Krem is also the only transgender representation in the entire game.

=== Dagna ===
Voiced by: Laura Bailey

Dagna is a dwarven arcanist who first appeared as a minor character in Origins. She offers her services to the Inquisition, and the Inquisitor will receive access to new items and upgrades as well as special crafting options if Dagna is recruited. Since Dagna has left Orzammar for the surface world, to become an established scholar of the Circle of Magi or as a self-taught arcanist depending on player choice in Origins, she has sacrificed her status as a smith caste dwarf and is now considered a surface dwarf. Dagna will assist the Inquisitor in dealing with the lieutenant of Corypheus, either Samson or Calpernia, depending on whether the rebel mages or the templars have been recruited.

If Sera remains with the Inquisition and is not in a romantic relationship with the Inquisitor, the epilogue for the Trespasser DLC will reveal that she is dating Dagna, whom she affectionately nicknames "Widdle".

=== Hawke ===
Voiced by: Nicholas Boulton and Jo Wyatt

Hawke is the protagonist of Dragon Age II, Champion of Kirkwall and ally to the Inquisition. By the events of Inquisition, Hawke has gone into hiding following the events of the Kirkwall Rebellion. Following the Inquisition's relocation to Skyhold, Hawke resurfaces and works alongside the Inquisitor to investigate the actions of the Grey Wardens in Orlais. Players could recreate their own custom Hawke using an in-game editor, and import their personality, class and accomplishments using the Dragon Age Keep program.

=== Alistair, Loghain and Stroud ===
Hawke is aided by a contact within the Grey Warden order, who has broken ranks with the Warden-Commander of Orlais with regards to her response to the Calling heard by every Grey Warden in southern Thedas, and went into hiding as a result. Depending on the player's choices, Alistair, Loghain, or Stroud may appear as Hawke's Grey Warden ally in Inquisition.

Alistair is a former companion of the Hero of Ferelden from Origins. Depending on player choices for Origins, Alistair may either appear in Inquisition as a member of the order, or as the ruling King of Ferelden instead; as King Alistair Theirin, he will make a cameo appearance in Redcliffe Castle by himself or alongside Loghain's daughter Queen Anora as joint monarchs, if the Inquisition recruits the rebel mages. If Alistair is not made king in Origins, Anora will appear by herself as the queen regnant of Ferelden, who either rules on her own or with her prince consort, who would be the Hero of Ferelden from a male Human Noble Origin. Alistair may also be the father of Morrigan's son, if he was chosen to perform the ritual with her prior to the Battle of Denerim in Origins, and may interact with Morrigan and their son at Skyhold if he remains with the order.

Loghain is the former Teyrn of Gwaren in the Kingdom of Ferelden who may, depending on player choice in Origins, survive the events of Origin and appear as Hawke's Warden ally. Loghain may also be the father of Morrigan's son, if he was chosen to perform the ritual with her prior to the Battle of Denerim in Origins, and may interact with Morrigan and their son at Skyhold.

Ser Jean-Marc Stroud is an Orlesian Grey Warden Stroud who first appears in Dragon Age II as a high ranking Warden who operates within the Free Marches region. He appears as Hawke's ally in a world state where Loghain is dead, or if Alistair is dead or no longer a Warden.

Alistair, Loghain and Stroud are voiced by Steve Valentine, Simon Templeman, and Stéphane Cornicard respectively.

=== Morrigan ===
Voiced by: Claudia Black

Morrigan is a mage who first appeared as a companion in Origins. By the events of Inquisition, she has been serving as an adviser for Empress Celene in Orlais. Claudia Black, who voices Morrigan in Origins, returns to voice the character. If the player romanced Morrigan or if the dark ritual was performed in Origins, Morrigan will have a son, Kieran, that she wholeheartedly cares for and loves.

=== Flemeth ===
Voiced by: Kate Mulgrew

Flemeth is the legendary and notorious Asha'bellanar, Witch of the Wilds, and mother of Morrigan. She is encountered by the Inquisitor and Morrigan whilst they are searching for a way to defeat Corypheus. Flemeth reveals that she is possessed by what is left of the elven goddess Mythal, and that she has been working throughout the centuries to give the goddess the justice that was denied to her. In Inquisition's post-credits scene, Flemeth meets Solas, who is revealed to be the elven god Fen'harel. She is then petrified and had her power drained by Solas, leaving her fate unknown.

=== Shaper Valta ===
Voiced by: Ali Hillis

Valta appears as a temporary follower during The Descent DLC; she is a scholar from the Shaperate in Orzammar. Valta comes from a highly respected smith caste family and she was born with a keen Stone sense required of the Shapers. As a Shaper, Valta used to record the Memories in lyrium. Three years ago she refused to remove an official record despite the order from her superiors. This refusal cost her dearly, as she was demoted and sent to do field research in the Deep Roads.

=== Lieutenant Renn ===
Voiced by: David Hayter

Renn appears as a temporary follower during The Descent DLC; he is a dwarven officer of the Legion of the Dead holding the rank of lieutenant, tasked by Orzammar's Shaperate with protecting Valta during her search for dwarven relics in the Deep Roads. The two developed mutual affinity, although Renn is skeptical of Valta's theories about her discoveries, in particular text about the mysterious Titans that predates the First Blight.

== Antagonists ==
=== Corypheus ===
Voiced by: David Sterne

The main antagonist in Inquisition, Corypheus is one of the original Magisters Sidereal: magic-wielding magisters from the Tevinter Imperium in ancient times, said to have broken into the Maker's Golden City long ago to claim it for their own selfish, power-hungry reasons. In spite of his defeat by Hawke in the Dragon Age II DLC Legacy, his soul is capable of transferring to another Blight-tainted body upon death; this includes any Grey Warden in his immediate vicinity.

By the events of Inquisition, Corypheus is known as the "Elder One" to his followers. He sets into motion a plan to tear open the Fade and become a god by using magic that he obtained from a powerful orb-shaped elven artifact. Due to the Inquisitor's unexpected interruption while he was making preparations to sacrifice Divine Justinia V as part of a ritual, the magic Corypheus desired was passed to them instead. After a long and arduous war, which involved the restored Inquisition recruiting allies and key agents all across Thedas, resolving the Orlesian Civil War, and obtaining forgotten magic from the elven goddess Mythal, the Inquisitor was able to finally end Corypheus by killing him with the power he craved, destroying the orb in the process. The ending of Inquisition reveals that the orb belonged to an individual known as Fen'Harel, who helped the Inquisition as Solas, who used Corypheus to unlock its destructive power.

=== Demons ===
Corypheus forged alliances with demonic entities of the Fade as part of his plan to breach the Fade and conquer the world. A core part of the lore and mythology of the Dragon Age series, demons play an important role in Inquisition's narrative and are some of the most common enemies faced by the Inquisition. Two of Corypheus' key allies are the Envy Demon, a shapeshifting spirit who has infiltrated the Templar Order by impersonating the presiding Lord Seeker, and the Nightmare, an ancient Fear demon of enormous size and power.

For Inquisition, the design team created a mixture of new and old creatures, in order to present a familiar yet refreshingly exciting feel for players. In addition to Pride and Rage Demons which are recurring enemies throughout the series, the childlike Despair Demon and various iterations of fear-based demons are among the new creatures introduced in Inquisition. For creatures like the Shade, a returning enemy type, the designers have added a bitpack progression, which is "a set of armored parts that are attached to the base model to change the silhouette and create a visual hierarchy in order illustrate the increased difficulty curve when encountering them over the campaign".

According to Shawn Hawco, lead character artist on the Dragon Age franchise, the Nightmare is designed with the understanding of arachnophobia as a commonly shared phobia, which the design team consider to be the perfect avenue to exploit. This is based on the lore of the Dragon Age series: demons find sustenance by feeding off the emotions of mortal beings. In its main form, it appears as a floating humanoid creature with spider-like appendages coming out of its back, and it is accompanied by small spider-like spirits known as "Fearlings". A larger, more formidable arachnoid form with innumerable eyes on its body is only seen in the Fade; the Inquisitor will encounter both forms of the Nightmare together in one occasion, in a sense linking both entities "across dimensions but also amplify the fear setting whenever they are encountered". The design team intended for the encounter to create an impression that the Nightmare is "starting to bleed into Thedas, and manifesting in the more humanoid form", and that the encounter amplifies a sense of fear as well as invoking a sense of resolve in the player.

=== The Red Templars ===
The Red Templars are a splinter faction of the Templar Order, which broke away from the Chantry prior to the events of Inquisition. Unlike the Demons that are bent on destruction, these corrupted templars are meant to be the elite soldiers of Corypheus. They will make up the bulk of his forces should the Inquisitor seek the help of the rebel mages in Redcliffe. Regardless of the faction the Inquisitor chooses to recruit, the Red Templars will still be found in certain areas of the game.

Their namesake stems from their use of red lyrium. Uncorrupted templars are given their powers from the use of normal lyrium. When red lyrium is used instead, a templar become more powerful, but at a terrible cost. Corrupted by the addictive power that red lyrium gave them, most of the Red Templar's senior members experience extensive physical deformation, mental deterioration, and crystallization of body parts into red lyrium itself. The design team intended to showcase the hierarchy of the faction through the extent of the transformations. Hawco explained that the normal rank and file soldiers "look no different from their counterparts, aside from the red lyrium crystal around their neck. The more specialized creatures show how the lyrium had mutated them to enhance their abilities. From the long crystal blades of the red lyrium assassin to the sheer intimidating size of the behemoth, we wanted to illustrate that red lyrium was indeed a powerful and potent drug".

Notable leaders of the Red Templars include Raleigh Samson, who first appeared in Dragon Age II, and Knight-Captain Denam.

=== The Venatori ===
The Venatori are a cult of Tevinter nationalist supremacists who have organized around serving their master, known to them as the Elder One, and help him attain divinity. Unlike demons or the Red Templars, the Venatori are the main human faction in Inquisition who do not have the benefit of innate supernatural abilities or powers aside from its spellcasting members. Venatori mages are known for using blood magic, which uses a living being's life force to fuel their magic, and are also known for their technique of binding multiple spirits into a single inanimate object such as books or other easily compartmentalized objects set with runes. Should the Inquisitor seek the help of the Templar Order at Therinfal Redoubt, the former Circle mages in Redcliffe will be incorporated into the Venatori, which bolster their numbers greatly. The Venatori may be found in multiple areas of the game, regardless of the faction the Inquisitor chooses to recruit.

The design team used visual elements of bondage to illustrate the power and tyranny of the Venatori's resolve. Most of the Venatori encountered by the Inquisition are masked, while others appear to be chained, clear identifying them as slaves who lack agency in their actions. The distinct look of the Venatori is meant to differentiate them from other human factions around Thedas; their choice of clothing represents the arid climate of the Tevinter Imperium, and also to evoke an ominous "sense of fear and deviance".

The Venatori is led by a Tevinter mage named Calpernia. Other notable leaders include Magisters Gereon Alexius and Livius Erimond.

=== Lord Seeker Lucius Corin ===
Voiced by: Timothy Watson

Lord Seeker Lucius Corin is the head of the Seekers of Truth, an organization responsible for leading and supervising the Templar Order. Both organizations once formed the Chantry's military wing, but Lambert van Reeves, Lucius' predecessor as Lord Seeker severed ties with the Chantry, as depicted in the novel Dragon Age: Asunder. In Inquisition, Lucius reaffirms the Templar Order's independence from the Andrastrian Chantry and declares both the Chantry's remaining leadership and the capital city of Orlais, Val Royeaux, unworthy of the Order's protection. Under his orders, the templars garrison themselves at the abandoned Seeker fortress of Therinfal Redoubt. If the Inquisition meets the Lord Seeker at Therinfal Redoubt, it is revealed the Lord Seeker they met in Val Royeaux is in fact an Envy demon in disguise, who is corrupting the Templar Order on behalf of Corypheus. The real Lucius Corin is also in league with Corypheus all along; he aligns himself with the Order of Fiery Promise, a longtime rival organization to the Seekers of Truth, to create a "new purer Order" that will start anew after the world ends with Corypheus' ascension to godhood.

=== Grand Duchess Florianne de Chalons ===
Voiced by: Emily Lucienne

Grand Duchess Florianne de Chalons is the sister of Grand Duke Gaspard de Chalons. She serves her cousin Empress Celene I as a respected but low ranking member of both her cabinet, and of the Imperial Court. The Grand Duchess is responsible for organizing the peace talks between Gaspard and Celene at the Winter Palace in Halamshiral in the Dales, but is secretly in league with Corypheus, believing that the darkspawn magister would give her all of Thedas to rule once he ascends to godhood.

=== The Jaws of Hakkon ===
The Jaws of Hakkon, also known as Hakkonites, are the eponymous antagonists of the Jaws of Hakkon DLC. They are a cult-like tribe of Avvar barbarians who have eschewed all other gods in favor of Hakkon Wintersbreath, the Avvar god of war and winter. Unlike many other Avvar, they are an aggressive group and seek to conquer the Fereldan Lowlands. The Hakkonites are based on a previous incarnation which were active centuries ago during the Second Blight, re-formed in the current age by Gurd Harofsen, an Avvar warrior formerly of Red Lion Hold in the Frostback Basin. He intends to locate an ancient dragon bound with the spirit of Hakkon Wintersbreath and draw the spirit into himself with a ritual to become its vessel.

=== The Viddasala ===
Voiced by: Louise Lambert

The Viddasala appears in the Trespasser DLC as the primary antagonist. She is one of the leaders of the Qunari religious police, the Ben-Hassrath, who presides over the branch whose name translates as "Dangerous Purpose". She specializes in finding, studying, and stopping magic. The Viddasala also handles the conversion of foreigners and the re-education of Qunari dissidents. In Trespasser The Viddasala is charged with overseeing the Dragon's Breath conspiracy, a plot which involve smuggling barrels of gaatlock (The Qunari version of gunpowder) into seats of power across southern Thedas using Qunari sleeper agents within the Inquisition. The plot's outcome is to simultaneously kill most of the leadership of southern Thedas, rendering the region vulnerable to Qunari occupation and conversion, ostensibly to prevent incidents like the Breach from being repeated through the Qunari leadership's suppression of magical activity. She is accompanied by a particularly powerful Qunari mage called Saarath, whom she unleashes on the Inquisition in an attempt to thwart their pursuit, instigating a boss fight while her forces are pursuing Fen'Harel and his agents, who are also attempting to foil the Qunari's plot.

== Critical reception ==
Several gaming media outlets have provided significant coverage about Inquisition's characters prior to the game's release. IGN's Mitch Dyer highlighted the ability to play as a Qunari and the gameplay mechanic of agents operating on behalf of the Inquisitor as "exceptional" features he looked forward to. Dyer was also intrigued by the option to play as a female Qunari, partly due to it being their first video game appearance. Matt Bertz of Game Informer was also glad to be able to play as a Qunari, believing "[t]he more playable races, the better in my mind". Also writing for Game Informer, Kimberley Wallace called the player's "reach" as Inquisitor one of Inquisition's "striking features", saying "Your character has so much power over where the story goes and how events will play out, and part of the fun is deciding what type of leader you want to be." Jenni Lada of TechnologyTell deeply hoped that EA would reveal more about who the romance options of the game were at E3 2014.

Following Inquisition's release, Kimberley Wallace of Game Informer praised its entire cast, noting a good mix of new and old characters as well as eclectic personalities. She found that Inquisition managed to find a right balance for its cast and that every character, companion or otherwise, does not feel superfluous and stand out in some way. She found that character side quests in Inquisition measure up to the standard set by BioWare's previous title, Mass Effect 2, in terms of memorable character moments and developments. She argued that the cast of characters from its prequels were "never this varied or evolved". Wallace concluded that she "felt significantly more invested and connected with everyone. There wasn't one shining star this time around; each character shines for different reasons to create a superior whole". In his 2014 review of Inquisition for Polygon, Phillip Kollar noted that while he does have his personal favorites, "there really isn't a weak character in the bunch this time around". Kollar found that "each companion has reams of dialogue conveying a fully developed personality", and that he felt invested enough to befriend every companion in his party and take their opinions seriously. Kollar praised the war table missions conducted with the Inquisitor's advisors and said it got at the heart of what makes Inquisition great: moving away from the story of a single hero all on their own and towards "a vast world of complex, interconnected political groups all at each other's throats".

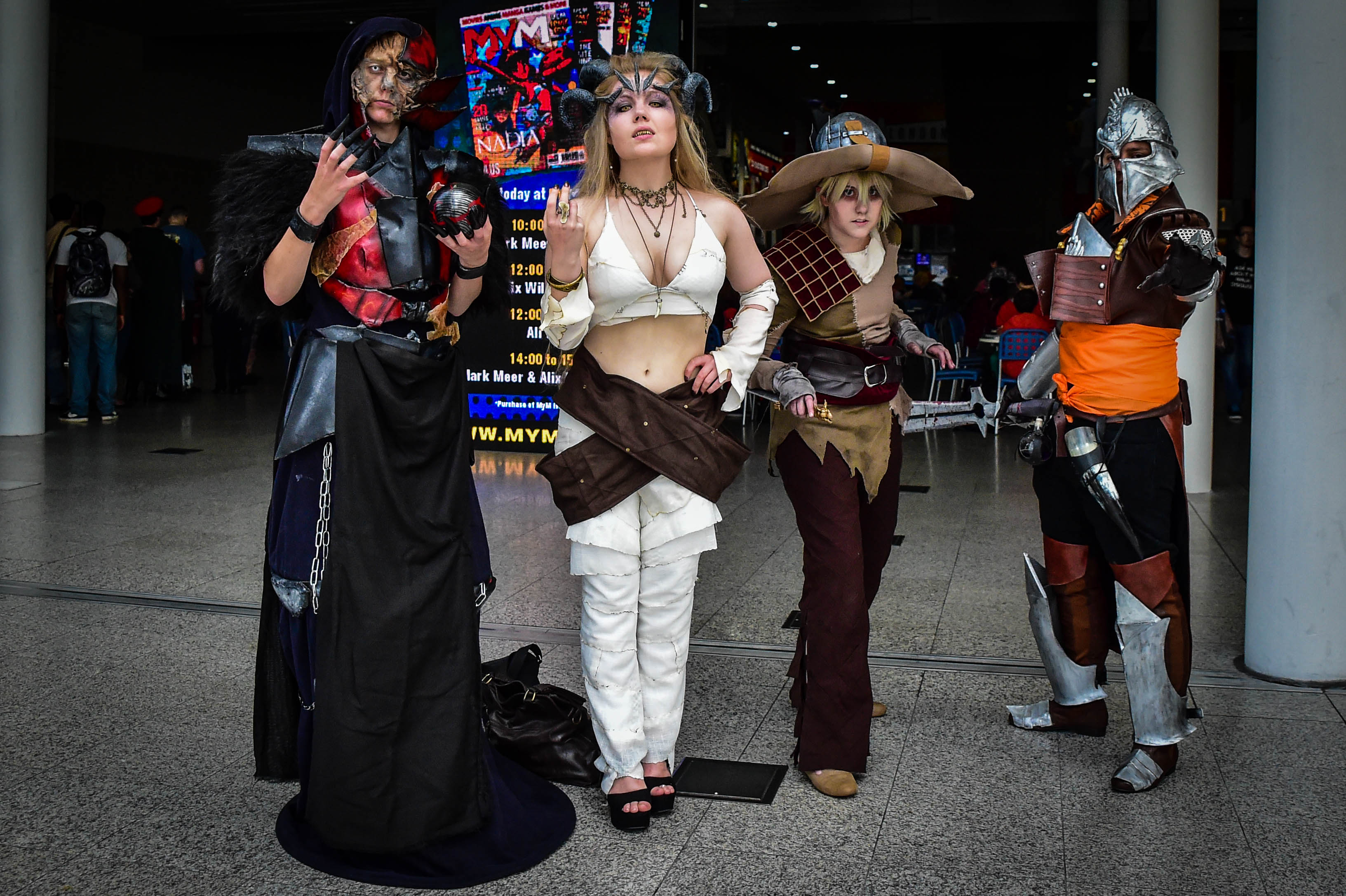
Fans cosplaying as Dragon Age: Inquisition characters.

Inquisition's cast of characters is praised for its diverse representation of various minority groups. For his list of 2014's Most Intriguing LGBT Characters, Matt Kane from GLAAD included four characters who made their first appearances in Inquisition. Mike Williams of US Gamer noted that even beyond its principal cast of characters, Inquisition made small, quiet steps forward by simply having women, people of colour and sexual minorities as random characters all over the game world, often in non-stereotyped roles. Williams was of the view that stories focusing on the character's specific race, gender, or religion do not always have to be the point of said character; he believes sometimes a stronger statement is made by allowing those characters to simply exist as part of the world. Danielle Riendeau of Polygon agreed with Williams over Inquisition's handling of both major and minor female characters. Riendeau praised the game for featuring some of the best and most memorable female characters of 2014, stating that "all of these characters are written with care, attention to detail, and enormous respect"

The romantic and sexual content encountered as part of the character subplots in Inquisition have been praised; one humorous scene involving the Iron Bull has been very well received. In her article published by Kotaku in December 2014, Patricia Hernandez shared and analyzed ten of the romance and sex scenes in Inquisition. She noted that "Some are good, if not outright hilarious. Some are a tad cringeworthy. But overall, it seems like Bioware has improved their approach to romance in games a bit". Reflecting on BioWare's uneven handling of queer characters and romance options over the years, Richard Cobbett, writing for PC Gamer, argued that "what matters though isn't really the execution, but the willingness to try". He lauded BioWare's developers for their willingness to push for inclusivity and that their recent characters are increasingly not defined by their sexuality. He notes that BioWare is in a position to demonstrate to the rest of the world about the right approach, concluding that "...they show how much further we still have to go, and how even the best of intentions doesn't always pay off as you might think. Either way though, I'm grateful they keep trying, and setting an example worth following".

Certain individual characters have received particular acclaim. For example, Hazel Monforton of PC Gamer praised Cole's characterization. She likes his inclusion in the Inquisitor's party, as he makes her rethink things which are often taken for granted, such as speech, memory, and compassion. She said that Cole approaches each "with a level of clarity that we might find confusing, at first. But as with any companion in Dragon Age, we’re richer for learning from his differences". Giant Bomb named Iron Bull the Best New Character of the Year Award in their Game of the Year Awards in December 2014. Another companion, Sera, was nominated for Best Character by Hardcore Gamer for their Best of 2014 Awards. In January 2015, GLAAD gave BioWare a "Special Recognition" award for their representation of LGBT characters in Inquisition.
