= Dragon Age: Blue Wraith =

- Variant cover art of the first issue by Matt Taylor

Publication information
- Publisher: Dark Horse Comics
- Format: Limited series
- Publication date: January – March 2020
- No. of issues: 3

Creative team
- Written by: Christina Weir; Nunzio DeFilippis
- Artist(s): Fernando Heinz Furukawa; Sachin Teng (cover); Matt Taylor (variant cover)
- Colorist: Michael Atiyeh

Dragon Age: Blue Wraith is a three-issue heroic fantasy comic book series published by Dark Horse Comics and released between January and March 2020. The series was co-written by Nunzio DeFilippis and Christina Weir, with artwork by Fernando Heinz Furukawa. A limited edition of the first issue with alternate cover art was released concurrently with the regular version. The series takes place after the events of Dragon Age: Deception, and follows the protagonists of both Dragon Age: Magekiller and Dragon Age: Knight Errant as they attempt to recruit the notorious elven warrior Fenris.

The series has received a generally positive reception from critics, who praised the overall quality of the artwork, character writing, and narrative, while criticism focused on the lack of accessibility for newcomers and the inclusion of an excessive amount of characters.

== Plot ==
The story follows a group of Inquisition operatives, which consist of Vaea, Ser Aaron Hawthorne, Marius, and Tessa Forsythia, as they attempt to follow a caravan led by a Tevinter magister, in order to seize powerful Tevinter artifact before it can be used to unleash chaos across the land. They are accompanied in their journey by Calix, Francesca Invidus, and the mabari hound Autumn, all of whom were first introduced in Deception. The group eventually encounters Fenris, who has become a notorious mage hunter by the events of Blue Wraith, garnering the eponymous nickname due to his lyrium infused skin and his ability to attack with deadly, quiet precision as he possesses a "phasing" ability that allows him to become intangible. The group later discovers that the artifact is an ornate sarcophagus-shaped device, designed to infuse elven subjects with lyrium, similar to the one that imbued Fenris his unusual abilities and potentially imbue them with the same abilities. Concerned about the magister's goal of weaponizing the device and that a former associate of his covets power offered by the device, Fenris agrees to ally with the group of Inquisition operatives and their associates in an attempt to stop the magister before he reaches his intended destination.

== Publication ==
Blue Wraith is the third Dragon Age comic book series by the same creative team as Knight Errant and Deception, which consists of husband and wife writing team Nunzio DeFilippis and Christina Weir, artist by Fernando Heinz Furukawa, colorist Michael Atiyeh, and cover artist Sachin Teng. DeFilippis is the Chair of the New York Film Academy (NYFA) Los Angeles Screenwriting Department and Dean of Faculty, while Weir is an instructor at NYFA. Matt Taylor provided the cover art for the limited edition of the first issue.

The series features Fenris as a co-lead character; the character's last appearance was 2011's Dragon Age II, but nevertheless is described by various sources as a fan favorite. According to Weir, "there is a lot of backstory to catch up on" for Fenris, and "a lot of in-story choices he's going to make". The creative team followed a story canon where Fenris was recruited by Hawke in Dragon Age II and stayed with their group until the end, where they all went their separate ways. DeFilippis and Weir wanted to explore a version of Fenris who has been left alone by his friends, and even a potential lover in Hawke, and his reaction to living in solitude. The writers worked closely with BioWare to ensure the comics do not conflict or contradict the video game setting; the developer provided notes along the way, and the writers would conduct story conferences with the developers before starting a miniseries. The writers claimed that their vision are always on the same page as the developer's notes on issues such as story quality and character development. On what set writing Blue Wraith apart from writing previous Dragon Age series, DeFilippis said they intended to paint on a bigger canvas than just the individual miniseries issue count, noting that while Knight Errant was a new concept, it picked up characters from Magekiller, which was then picked up by Deception and so on, describing the story continuity as "one long quest”.

On the redesign process, Furukawa said he took what he liked the most of the original design as well as alternate designs depicted in concept art, and added visual cues like a scarf to give the character something that he could use to depict movement. Furukawa recalled using a lot of references from existing games and comics of the series, and then he did further research for more realistic reference for castles, armors, and weapons to match the established tone of the series.

In February 2020, original Fenris voice actor Gideon Emery uploaded an audio recording on his twitter account reading specific dialogue from the comic on a fan's request.

== Release ==
The Blue Wraith mini-series consist of three issues, all of which have been released digitally on Dark Horse's official website. Issue #1 featured the first ever variant comic for the Dragon Age series, which is bundled with a 11x14 giclée fine art print of the variant cover art, saw a limited edition physical release. The series will be collected and released as a trade paperback graphic novel, pending release on July 8, 2020.

Issue	Date	Pages	Creators
1	15 January 2020	32	Writers: Nunzio DeFilippis and Christina Weir; Artist: Fernando Heinz Furukawa; Colorist: Michael Atiyeh; Cover Artist: Sachin Teng
2	19 February 2020	32	Writers: Nunzio DeFilippis and Christina Weir; Artist: Fernando Heinz Furukawa; Colorist: Michael Atiyeh; Cover Artist: Sachin Teng
3	18 March 2020	32	Writers: Nunzio DeFilippis and Christina Weir; Artist: Fernando Heinz Furukawa; Colorist: Michael Atiyeh; Cover Artist: Sachin Teng

== Reception ==
The series as a whole holds a score of 7.8 out of 10 on comics review aggregator Comic Book Roundup, indicating generally favorable reviews, based on 14 reviews by critics of individual issues.

The first issue received mixed or average reviews, with an aggregate score of 7.3 out of 10. Reviewing the first issue for Multiversity Comics, Gregory Ellner praised the coloring work, but commented that while longtime fans of Dragon Age may find it intriguing, "the narrative is better for returning fans than it is inviting for anyone coming into the world of BioWare's dark fantasy franchise fresh", scoring the issue 6.5 out of 10. Matthew Aguilar was more positive about the first issue and scoring it 4 out of 5, and commented that "Dragon Age fans will enjoy Fenris' appearance. He was hopeful that Fenris will have a more prominent role in the series.

Reviewing the second issue, Aguilar from Comicbook.com complimented the writers for their thorough and in-depth knowledge of the series, particularly in how events from Dragon Age II were organically woven into the story. In his assessment of the third and final issue, Aguilar also scored it 4 out of 5, noting that "it is a bummer that the book feels as if it's about to take off in an awesome direction by the book's last page", though he is hopeful for the future of the Dragon Age comic series. Christa Harada from Multiversity Comics felt that the second issue struggled to balance a huge cast and dense story, saying that while it "slows down a bit to give us some more time with Fenris", it was insufficient to offset the overly hectic pace of the first issue.

Charles Hartford from But Why Tho? scored the second issue 9 out of 10, drawing attention to the satisfying cliffhanger moments staged by the creative team. He commented that the team, who have previously worked on Knight Errant and Deception, have put their stamp on this corner of the world and expressed hope the creative team could keep this energy going so they could finish the story with an explosive final act. He scored the final issue 8 out of 10, and concluded that Blue Wraith treats its characters wonderfully and that it "lands some truly emotional moments splendidly", noting that he would have considered the series perfect if it felt more like a complete story.

== Sequel ==
Blue Wraith is followed by Dragon Age: Dark Fortress, another three-issue miniseries published and released between March 2021 to May 2021.
