= Dragon Age: Deception =

Heroic fantasy comic book

- Cover art of the first issue by Sachin Teng

Publication information
- Publisher: Dark Horse Comics
- Format: Limited series
- Publication date: October – December 2018
- No. of issues: 3

Creative team
- Written by: Christina Weir; Nunzio DeFilippis
- Artist(s): Fernando Heinz Furukawa; Sachin Teng (cover)
- Colorist: Michael Atiyeh

Dragon Age: Deception is a three-issue heroic fantasy comic book limited series published by Dark Horse Comics and released between October and December 2018. The series was co-written by Nunzio DeFilippis and Christina Weir, with artwork by Fernando Heinz Furukawa. The series takes place after the events of the 2017 miniseries Dragon Age: Knight Errant and features appearances from its protagonists, Ser Aaron Hawthorne and Vaea, as well as Dorian Pavus, a major character from Dragon Age: Inquisition. Deception follows a con artist named Olivia Pryde, who crosses paths with another con artist in the Tevinter city of Ventus, which is on the brink of war.

The series has received a generally positive reception from critics, who praised the overall quality of the artwork, character writing, and narrative.

== Plot ==
The story opens with Olivia Pryde, a failed actress turned con artist, as she prepares her disguise as a Magister in Ventus, a city in the Tevinter Imperium. At a tavern, she targets Calix, a young man she believes to be the scion of the reclusive Magister Qintara, only to discover that he is also a con-artist like herself albeit with less experience. Following a confrontation, Olivia and Calix agree to cooperate in targeting a pair of siblings, Francesca and Florian Invidus, but their competitiveness undermines their ruse and forces them to flee from the Invidus' guards. The pair, along with Olivia's pet Mabari hound Autumn, run into Ser Aaron, a former lover and mark of Olivia who offers them protection from their pursuers by his friend, the Magister Dorian Pavus. In exchange, Aaron secures their cooperation to assist his squire Vaea to break into the Qintara estate and retrieve the red lyrium that was previously stolen from the city-state of Kirkwall during the events of Knight Errant, as Ventus is on the verge of an invasion by the Qunari.

== Publication ==
The Knight Errant series was first announced by Dark Horse Comics on June 29, 2018, along with a preview of the comic's first cover. Like, Knight Errant, Deception features new lead characters who have not appeared in previous media. Polygon offered a preview of the comic's first six pages, interior art, and story.

Deception is the second Dragon Age comic book series by the same creative team as Knight Errant, which consists of husband and wife writing team Nunzio DeFilippis and Christina Weir, artist by Fernando Heinz Furukawa, colorist Michael Atiyeh, and cover artist Sachin Teng. DeFilippis is the Chair of the New York Film Academy (NYFA) Los Angeles Screenwriting Department and Dean of Faculty, while Weir is an instructor at NYFA. Though the writers regularly produce fictional writings through their creator-owned books, they have since become regular collaborators to the Dragon Age media franchise, beginning with Knight Errant. Prior to the commencement of their work on Deception, the writers were instructed by BioWare's Dragon Age writing team on how the story world would progress going forward, and decided to seed a major piece of emerging lore in its story to advance BioWare's creative direction and shape the franchise's overarching narrative.

Describing Dragon Age as an established universe with "its own history, characters, and fan-base", the writers had the opportunity to utilize their own central characters alongside fan-favorite characters like Dorian Pavus, who play a small but important role in the plot of Deception. The writers noted during an interview that it was easier to write for Knight Errant compared to Deception, as the former consists of five issues, which allowed the writers more space to properly develop story arcs. The writers described their creative process as painting on a bigger canvas made up of the franchise's individual mini-series as components for their storytelling, a "long quest" which began with Knight Errant.

== Release ==
The Deception mini-series consist of three issues, all of which have been released digitally on Dark Horse's official website. All three issues were collected and released as a trade paperback graphic novel, pending release in March 2019.

Issue	Date	Pages	Creators
1	17 October 2018	32	Writers: Nunzio DeFilippis and Christina Weir; Artist: Fernando Heinz Furukawa; Colorist: Michael Atiyeh; Cover Artist: Sachin Teng
2	14 November 2018	32	Writers: Nunzio DeFilippis and Christina Weir; Artist: Fernando Heinz Furukawa; Colorist: Michael Atiyeh; Cover Artist: Sachin Teng
3	12 December 2018	32	Writers: Nunzio DeFilippis and Christina Weir; Artist: Fernando Heinz Furukawa; Colorist: Michael Atiyeh; Cover Artist: Sachin Teng

== Reception ==
The series as a whole holds a score of 8.3 out of 10 on comics review aggregator Comic Book Roundup, indicating generally favorable reviews, based on 8 reviews by critics of individual issues. Caitlin Rosberg from Paste praised the return of the same creative team from Knight Errant, as in her view it "builds confidence that the story will be as sharp, engaging and fun as they do so again".

Rollin Bishop from ComicBook.com positively reviewed all three issues of Deception and suggested that it may have been the best Dragon Age comic book series to date. He observed that Deception drew elements from previous series in a manner that feels natural, while offering newer perspectives, questions and implications, although the first issue's initial premise of con artists was thin in his view. Bishop found that its second issue demonstrated that the series was the fastest among previous Dragon Age comic book series when transitioning between plot points to reach the mystery at the plot's core, and that it successfully plays off established characters with new ones. Bishop felt that the conclusion of the series by its third issue demonstrated that a three-issue arc was the appropriate length, praising each panel's pacing, the overall plot, and the manner in which the characters could engage the reader.

Multiversity Comics praised the series for its characters and dialogue. Both Rowan Grover and Laura Merrill from Multiversity Comics lauded Olivia Pryde as a good leading character for Deception. Grover liked how she is set up as an relatable and strong character by the writers of Deception. Merrill in particular liked how Deception "elegantly walks the line between comedy and tragedy with a complicated hero", and felt that the writers convincingly constructed a good example of a deeply flawed anti-hero archetype who achieves redemption in the end. When summarizing the Dragon Age comic series from the 2010s, Merrill considered Deception to be one of the best, primarily due to its depiction of its doomed protagonist, Olivia Pryde, as a female protagonist with agency who could keep readers absorbed and engaged in her actions.

The series' artwork and its attention to detail has received unanimous praise from commentators. Describing artist Fernando Heinz Furukawa's style as "Arthur Adams vibes with a little bit of Shonen manga mixed in", Grover lauded the "nicely detailed art that is expressive and human, yet fluid and fast-paced at the same time", praised Furukawa's skill at crafting "capable dynamic facial expressions" to complement the dialogue. Rosberg thought Furukawa managed to bring new life to established Dragon Age characters. Grover praised the color work by Mike Atiyeh for its "fresh, bright palette", which gives a "coastal and fresh feel" to Deception. Sachin Teng's cover art for the first two issues of the series was praised by Steven Foxe from Paste. Bishop is particularly impressed with Teng's work, and remarked that the first issue's "cover alone might be worth the price".

== Sequel ==
Deception is followed by Dragon Age: Blue Wraith with the same creative team. Blue Wraith continues the overarching narrative and character arcs introduced in Knight Errant and Deception, and also incorporates returning characters from Dragon Age II and Dragon Age: Magekiller.
