= Wind Dancer =

- Sofia Mantega as Renascence, as depicted in The New Warriors (vol. 4) #9 (April 2008). Art by Paco Medina.

Publication information
- Publisher: Marvel Comics
- First appearance: New Mutants (vol. 2) #1 (July 2003)
- Created by: Nunzio DeFilippis; Christina Weir; Keron Grant

In-story information
- Alter ego: Sofia Elizabeth Mantega-Barrett
- Species: Human mutant
- Team affiliations: New Mutants training squad New Warriors; S.H.I.E.L.D; Avengers
- Notable aliases: Renascence
- Abilities: Minimal athlete and martial artist Air, wind and climate manipulation Flight; Long-distance eavesdropping

Sofia Elizabeth Mantega, also known as Wind Dancer and formerly known as Renascence, is a fictional character, a mutant appearing in American comic books published by Marvel Comics. One of the student body in the Xavier Institute, she is a member of the New Mutants squad therein. Her first appearance was in New Mutants, vol. 2 #1.

== Fictional character biography ==
=== Early life ===
Sofia was born and lived most of her life in Caracas, Venezuela. While under the care of her uncle, Sofia's mother is killed in a riot. Her only Venezuelan adult relative, an uncle, is unable to support her in addition to his own children, so she is sent to her father Walter Barrett, who had been previously unaware of her existence. The head of a major supermarket chain in the United States, Barrett is a cold, asocial man with little interest in his daughter. As such, he extracts from her a promise that she would learn English before school started, she would get good grades, and she would not use her mutant power, in exchange for which all her material wants would be provided for without question.

Over the next three weeks, Sofia befriends Barrett's manservant Derek Newton, learns English, and joins a local school, but despite her outgoing nature, she has difficulty fitting in and is unable to reconcile herself to Barrett's lack of affection for her. She ultimately acts out by skipping school and wrecking one of Barrett's stores. Barrett is incensed, less at the destruction of his store than by her exposing him as the father of a mutant, and considers leaving her in prison for 48 hours to punish her. Danielle Moonstar, having seen Sofia's vandalism on the news, steps in and offers her a place at the Xavier Institute.

=== Xavier Institute ===
Wind Dancer as a New Mutant using her wind powers.

Sofia and Laurie Collins are assigned to the New Mutants squad, along with Surge, Elixir, Prodigy, and Wither. Prodigy rejects the offer to lead the New Mutants, so the position falls to Sofia. Sofia doubts her leadership skills, which leads Prodigy to form a compromise. He agrees to be co-leader of the New Mutants to better mesh their strengths.

=== New Warriors ===
In Decimation, Wind Dancer loses her powers along with 98% of the mutant population when the Scarlet Witch produces a reality-bending spell in an attempt to solve the human/mutant problem. Along with most of the de-powered students, she leaves the Xavier Institute, planning to return to Venezuela. For as-yet-unknown reasons, Sofia instead moves to New York City, where she lives alone and works as a waitress. She feels directionless in her new "normal" life and has nightmares about losing her powers.

Sofia is invited to join the New Warriors, but initially turns down the offer. During a battle between the New Warriors and Zodiac, Sofia tries to get a young boy to safety, but is blasted from behind. After being treated, Sofia reconsiders Night Thrasher's offer to join the New Warriors, as he is considering disbanding the group. She takes the codename Renascence and utilizes a suit with electrified tentacles to make up for her lack of powers.

=== Krakoa ===
During the Krakoan Age, Wind Dancer becomes an online streamer broadcasting to the Mojoverse. After making a poll with her followers, she learns that they want her to die and hires Adam X to kill her. The Five quickly resurrect Wind Dancer, restoring her powers in the process. Following the end of the Krakoan Age, Dazzler returns to her musical career and Wind Dancer becomes her publicist.

== Powers and abilities ==
Wind Dancer is a mutant with the ability to control the movement of air, which included the ability to generate wind with intense force, lift and carry objects, fly and, more subtly, amplify small vibrations in the air - allowing her to hear faraway conversations.

As Renascence, she wore a suit equipped with six metallic tentacles that could discharge surges of electricity. She was also equipped with a personal force field that emits a golden aura.

Sofia has some athletic and martial arts skills due to her training as a New Mutant at Xavier's and the combat sessions with the New Warriors.
