= Dragon Age: Magekiller =

2015–2016 fantasy comic book series

- Cover art of the first issue by Sachin Teng

Publication information
- Publisher: Dark Horse Comics
- Format: Limited series
- Publication date: December 2015 – April 2016
- No. of issues: 5

Creative team
- Written by: Greg Rucka
- Artist: Sachin Teng (cover)
- Penciller: Carmen Carnero
- Inker: Terry Pallot
- Colorist: Michael Atiyeh

Dragon Age: Magekiller is a five-issue dark fantasy comic book series published by Dark Horse Comics set in the Dragon Age universe, and released between December 2015 and April 2016. The series was written by Greg Rucka, with artwork by Carmen Carnero and Terry Pallot. The timeline of the series run concurrently with the events of Dragon Age: Inquisition and tells the story, in several arcs, of the "mage-killer" Marius and his loquacious handler Tessa Forsythia. The series also tells the origin story and rise of the Venatori faction, and features appearances by several secondary characters from the Dragon Age series.

The series has received an overall mixed reception. Critics praised the writing and artwork but felt that exposition and story set-up were prioritized at the expense of developing the actual narrative, while other sources consider Magekiller one of the best video game based comic books.

== Plot ==
Marius and Tessa are mercenary partners who hunt maleficarum: blood mages who employ blood magic, a school of magic that uses the power inherent in a living being's blood to fuel spellcasting, and also to twist the blood in others for domination or violent corrupting purposes. In the second issue they are inadvertently recruited and coerced by Archon Radonis, the powerful mage-ruler of the Tevinter Imperium, to hunt down and assassinate key members of the Venatori, an armed nationalist cult seeking to restore the Imperium of old and therefore threatening his rule as Archon. The remainder of the series follow the plight of Marius and Tessa as they end up on the run from the Archon's forces, and witnessed the opening of the Breach in the sky, which leads to other job opportunities including membership of the fledgling Inquisition.

Notable characters from Inquisition who appear in the series include Dorian Pavus, a companion of the Inquisitor; Calpernia, a Venatori leader; Cremisius "Krem" Aclassi, second-in-command of the Bull's Chargers mercenary group; and Leliana, co-founder and spymaster of the Inquisition.

== Publication ==
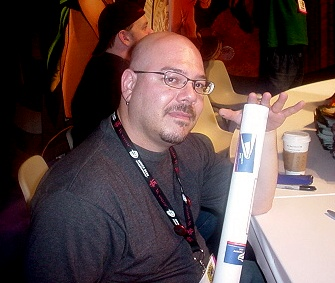
Dragon Age: Magekiller is writer Greg Rucka's first comic series set in the Dragon Age universe.

Magekiller marked the fourth comic book series published by Dark Horse Comics under the Dragon Age license. The series was first announced by Polygon in an exclusive interview with Greg Rucka, published on July 3, 2015, and an official announcement was to be made at San Diego Comic Con 2015. It is a spin-off series featuring protagonists Marius, a former Tevinter slave "who was raised and trained to kill mages without using magic himself, and Tessa, the estranged child of the powerful Forsythia family in the kingdom of Nevarra. They met "somewhere south of Tevinter" and joined forces as a mage-killing mercenary outfit. The story of Magekiller begins when Marius and Tessa "take a job from a powerful patron and realize that they are in over their heads, so much so that the task may just be their last."

The comic series was written by Greg Rucka, with Carmen Carnero as penciller and Terry Pallot as inker. Michael Atiyeh provided colors for the series, and Sachin Teng was the cover artist for the series. Rucka expressed enthusiasm for his contribution to the Dragon Age series with Magekiller, praising its setting as "one of the most fully and beautifully realized examples of world building that we’ve seen", and that his priority was to focus on expanding it. On the series' overarching tension between those who can use magic and those who cannot, Rucka asserted that it is an element that really "should exist in any fantasy world where magic exists", as the use of magic "grossly slants the playing field", which makes it problematic on every social, political, economic, interpersonal, spiritual or religious level.

Rucka explained that the expression of that tension in Magekiller is dissimilar to the war between mages and templars seen in the games and in other media. He described the first arc of the comic series as an introduction to the main characters as well as some self discovery on their part, noting that Marius is neither a rogue templar who believes "all mages must die" nor is he a facsimile of Fenris from Dragon Age II, as he is simply a sellsword who is "really, really good at what he does, but that's all that he was ever trained to do." He said Marius was conceived from a suggestion by former series writer David Gaider for a "Tevinter Boba Fett". He described Tessa's role as someone who "facilitates", "assists", and "maintains" Marius, and that "there's a lot she doesn't know about him, just as there's a lot that he doesn't know about her". Rucka said he wanted to make sure that Magekiller feels like it could fit within any player's version of events in spite of the variety of decisions they could make in Inquisition.

== Release ==
The Magekiller series consist of five issues. All five issues of the series have been released digitally on Dark Horse's official website, and were subsequently collected and released as a trade paperback graphic novel, released on July 27, 2016. The Magekiller series was included in Dragon Age Library Edition Volume 2, an anthology collection of comics released on October 24, 2018.

| Issue | Date | Pages | Creators |
|---|---|---|---|
| 1 | 16 December 2015 | 23 | Writers: Greg Rucka; Pencillers: Carmen Carnero; Inkers: Terry Pallot; Colorist: Michael Atiyeh; Cover Artist: Sachin Teng |
| 2 | 20 January 2016 | 22 | Writers: Greg Rucka; Pencillers: Carmen Carnero; Inkers: Terry Pallot; Colorist: Michael Atiyeh; Cover Artist: Sachin Teng |
| 3 | 17 February 2016 | 23 | Writers: Greg Rucka; Pencillers: Carmen Carnero; Inkers: Terry Pallot; Colorist: Michael Atiyeh; Cover Artist: Sachin Teng |
| 4 | 16 March 2016 | 22 | Writers: Greg Rucka; Pencillers: Carmen Carnero; Inkers: Terry Pallot; Colorist: Michael Atiyeh; Cover Artist: Sachin Teng |
| 5 | 20 April 2016 | 23 | Writers: Greg Rucka; Pencillers: Carmen Carnero; Inkers: Terry Pallot; Colorist: Michael Atiyeh; Cover Artist: Sachin Teng |

== Reception ==
The series as a whole holds a score of 6.9 out of 10 on comics review aggregator Comic Book Roundup, indicating mixed or average reviews, based on 32 reviews by critics of individual issues. With the exception of Issues #3 which had scored 7.6 out of 10, indicating generally favorable reviews, all other individual issues received generally mixed or average reviews. Reviewing the first issue for AIPT, Todd Young praised the title as well-written and that "there is an opportunity for the characters and story to be really interesting going forward for any reader", and that fans of Inquisition will appreciate "certain references and an understanding of the general dynamic of the world." Greg McElhatto from Comic Book Resources criticized the ending of the first issue for being predictable; though construed as a twist within the confines of the story itself, he believes most readers will see it coming. He scored the issue 7 out of 10 and said the comic is overall a fun read, and that it motivates him to play a Dragon Age game and continue to follow the series. On the other hand, ComiConverse scored the first issue 6 out of 10 and said it "fails to create an exciting introduction by spending too much time on exposition and not enough time developing the world."

Nevertheless, various sources considered the Dragon Age: Magekiller series to be one of the best video game based comic books, including Gamesradar, Comic Book Resources, PreviewsWorld, and Gameinformer.

== Sequel ==
Magekiller is followed by Dragon Age: Knight Errant, written by Christina Weir and Nunzio DeFilippis with artwork by Fernando Heinz Furukawa, though Michael Atiyeh and Sachin Teng are retained as colorist and cover artist. The story is centered on an elven thief named Vaea who is set on a dangerous recovery mission for Marius and Tessa after the pair are captured during an Inquisition mission. Both series have been collected and re-released as Dragon Age Library Edition Volume 2 on October 16, 2018, and as part of the Dragon Age: The First Five Graphic Novels compilation released on October 27, 2020.
