= Krem (Dragon Age) =

Cremisius Aclassi Krem
- Dragon Age character
- Krem as he appears in Dragon Age: Inquisition
- First appearance: Dragon Age: Inquisition (2014)
- Created by: Patrick Weekes
- Designed by: Colleen Perman
- Voiced by: Jennifer Hale

In-universe information
- Full name: Cremisius Aclassi
- Nickname: Krem
- Gender: Trans man

Cremisius "Krem" Aclassi is a fictional character in the 2014 video game Dragon Age: Inquisition. He is a former soldier in the Tevinter Imperium's military forces, and is currently a member of the Bull's Chargers, a mercenary company led by the Iron Bull. He was created and written by Patrick Weekes. Canadian-American voice actress Jennifer Hale voiced Krem in Inquisition.

Krem is the first transgender character to appear in a BioWare video game. The character has received mostly positive reception in the Dragon Age series as a positive representation of transgender characters in video games.

== Concept and creation ==
"Talking over drinks at the bar later, we hit two major challenges. First, any conversation about the subject had to come up naturally in-game. A minor character like a shopkeeper would have no reason to explain that he is trans, so either the conversation would never come up or it would come up because his voice was clearly masculine, at which point it would look like a joke to most players, no matter how we tried to write it. Second, the character had to serve a purpose beyond “being there to be a genderqueer person.” Every character in our game serves a purpose — reinforcing the theme of a plot, character, or area — and we do not have the budget for someone who is just there to tick off a box."

— Patrick Weekes, "Building a Character: Cremisius “Krem” Aclassi"

Krem is the second openly transgender character in the Dragon Age series, the first being Maevaris Tilani from the comic mini-series Dragon Age: Those Who Speak. Patrick Weekes went into detail about the multi-year creation process for Krem in a blog post published on the official BioWare blog dated December 4, 2014. They revealed that the idea for Krem first began when BioWare organised a panel discussion on how characters from the LGBTQ community are presented in its video games at a prior PAX event. Weekes claimed that an oft-repeated request from fans was for a respectful representation of transgender and/or genderqueer characters, without resorting to stereotypes or tokenism.

The writing team for Inquisition brainstormed and eventually came up with an idea to make the Iron Bull's lieutenant as such a character. Weekes developed the idea that Iron Bull's character, as a mercenary commander, would require the presence of a subordinate as a grounding force "to remind players that Bull has a history of command" and that he "is more than just hired muscle". This character would represent Iron Bull's dilemma over being pulled between a life of freedom and a life of devotion and submission to the Qunari system of thought and behavior, the Qun, and that his status as a trans man could enable them to explore gender roles in Qunari culture. Weekes noted that their writing goal was for Krem "to be a positive character who was living his life happily now", noting that a team of editors would examine every line of dialogue involving Krem and alter any dialogue and paraphrases that may give a wrong impression. Iron Bull and Krem would constantly bicker about little things as part of their relationship dynamic, but never attack each other's "truly sore spots".

The lead writer of Inquisition, David Gaider, recalled that he approved of Weekes' proposal to portray the Iron Bull's lieutenant as a trans man during a meeting, and he suggested canvassing feedback from someone within the transgender community. Gaider explained that Serendipity, a minor queer character who appeared in the Dragon Age II downloadable content Mark Of The Assassin, was intended to be a drag queen, but her comedic portrayal was interpreted by some fans as transphobic. He found the criticisms directed towards Serendipity to be regrettable, and he wanted a transgender character to be properly depicted should the opportunity present itself.

Weekes disclosed that they had received criticism after soliciting constructive feedback about their characterization of Krem from their friends within the genderqueer community; an initial draft which had Krem deserting from the Tevinter Imperium after fighting off someone who discovered his secret and attempted to assault him was derided for relying on the "attacked trans person" stereotype. The feedback Weekes received indicated that while the scenario is plausible, it may inadvertently become an emotional trigger for real life transgender players who have faced traumatic transphobic attacks.

Krem was specially designed as gender appropriate on matters such as animation, body language, and translation for localization. Krem's face was created by Development Manager Colleen Perman using the character artist team's head-morph system. Hale, who has played multiple characters in BioWare's games, developed a voice for a trans man "in a world without access to transitional procedures" under Director of Voice Acting Caroline Livingstone's direction. Weekes noted though it wasn't the simplest of tasks to overcome" as much of the game's engine was based on set assignments of gender, "from voice to face to animation set to localization plan for foreign languages", and praised the various departments working on Inquisition for their enthusiasm and dedication.

== Appearances ==
Krem is briefly seen in a cinematic trailer promoting Inquisition starring Iron Bull, which was uploaded on multiple EA-affiliated channels, prior to the release of the game.

Krem appears as a non-playable character in Inquisition, where he serves as the Iron Bull's second in command of the Bull's Chargers. Krem is first encountered outside the Haven Chantry building following the Inquisition leadership's return from the Orlesian capital city of Val Royeaux; he reveals that he was sent by his commander and suggests that their mercenary company would be a good fit for the Inquisition, and a worthy hire in spite of their high asking price. Krem, along with Iron Bull will later be found in the Storm Coast where they could be recruited for the Inquisition. Speaking to Krem periodically after completing a major event in Inquisition's narrative will unlock side quests and text-based war table operations throughout the game. Krem's fate is also involved in the Iron Bull's personal side quest, the outcome of which depends on the player-controlled Inquisitor choosing between sacrificing the Chargers or rescuing them at the expense of an alliance with the Qunari and Bull being excommunicated from Qunari society.

Krem appears in the five-issue limited comic series Dragon Age: Magekiller, where he is dispatched by Bull to lead the Chargers on an operation to the Hissing Wastes with Dorian Pavus and a mage assassin named Marius.

== Reception ==
Although he is presented as a minor character in Inquisition, Krem received significant media coverage from gaming journalists and LGBT-centric media outlets due to his positive depiction as a transgender character in a AAA video game. He has been described by various sources as groundbreaking, as well as the best representation of a transgender character in the video game medium. GLAAD's Matt Kane included Krem and fellow Inquisition characters Sera, Dorian and The Iron Bull in his list of 2014's Most Intriguing LGBT Characters. In February 2016, Vada Magazine provided coverage of a satirical work about negative fan reaction to Krem's 2014 debut in Inquisition by Point & Clickbait, noting that "people are still talking about him two years later".

Queerty staff was impressed by BioWare's handling of Krem's gender identity, as was Sam Maggs from The Mary Sue. Maggs stated "the fact that BioWare has chosen to make a major side character in the game trans, and have a whole dialogue about it in-game, is a huge step forward in representation in mainstream gaming". Matt Baume mentioned Krem in his article "Dorian of Dragon Age: Inquisition: Why Gaming's 'Breakout' Gay Character Matters", and praised his storyline for providing players the opportunity to ask questions, and demonstrates "how one can be accepting and considerate of the feelings of trans people". Author Nicholas Taylor includes him in a section on transgender characters in the book Queerness in Play, discussing how Krem's role in the narrative can educate players about their experiences with gender, identity, and expression through exposition. Shann Smith from Pop Dust claimed that among the characters of Inquisition, "the amount of sheer representation in this game is enough to write a book on", but felt that Krem was the standout of the cast. He opined that Krem should have had a spot in the Inquisitor's party as a playable character instead of Blackwall. In a later article uploaded in 2018, Smith discussed transgender visibility in video games and compared Krem's portrayal to Birdo and Poison, two other notable transgender video game characters.

Fraser Brown from PCGamesN praised Hale's subtle and understated performance. Brown thought that Krem's voice "sounded youthful, like a boy’s, but also gruff, which was an unusual juxtaposition"; it was not apparent to him at the time of his playthrough that Krem's voice actor is actually a woman. Although she liked that Inquisition's character design allows for female characters to appear with an Adam's apple and she considered Krem to be a well-written character, Kristine Croto from Inquisitr expressed disappointment that Krem is voiced by Hale, a cisgender actress. She compared the casting of a cisgender actor to play a transgender character, to putting white actors in black face to play a person of color. To Croto, "a cis-gendered actress playing a trans man is by definition “acting” man", which undermines the point about gender identity made by Iron Bull to a male player character. Emma Osborne from Junkee agreed that an actual trans person should have been cast as Krem's voice actor. They felt that while the player is presented with options to have their Inquisitor ask questions which they consider to be insensitive, to them it "nevertheless presents a learning experience for the player".

Weekes further revealed they have received feedback from transgender players following the launch of Inquisition, who felt the player choices were written to be "too clueless and uninformed". Kotaku's Kirk Hamilton praised Weekes for being clear and transparent about Krem's developmental process and the feedback they have received. Echoing Weekes' experience for approaching and handling Krem's characterization, he pointed out that it is crucial for writers who do not identify as transgender to always ask transgender and genderqueer people for feedback when attempting to write such a character. He praised BioWare for being willing to actively listen and learn from its audience, and that more studios should follow their example.
