= Durwin Talon =

Canadian artist and author

- Born: London, Ontario
- Areas: artist and writer
- Notable works: Panel Discussions (books); Bonds (comics)

Durwin Talon (born in London, Ontario) is a comics artist, illustrator, author and professor of illustration.

== Early life and education ==
Talon developed an interest in art at an early age. He received his bachelor's degree in Fine Arts (BFA) from the Savannah College of Art and Design (SCAD), then received his ISDP Master's Degree (MA) from Syracuse University in the United States. In 2007, he received the terminal degree of Masters of Fine Arts (MFA) in Illustration from the University of Hartford.

== Career ==
Talon's first book, Panel Discussions from TwoMorrows Publishing, is an overview of techniques for developing sequential art. It has been described as "indispensable reading for anyone interested in the subject of sequential art."

His artwork has been featured on the covers of Batman, Skinwalker, and Queen & Country. A review of Skinwalker No. 3 commented that "[t]he covers by Durwin Talon are a wonderful blend of pastel and oil that prompt you into wishing we could read a whole book that looks like this." Durwin painted all 8 covers of the Batman: Officer Down cross-series story arc, in 2001: (Batman #587, Robin #86, Batgirl #12, Birds of Prey #27, Catwoman #90, Nightwing #53, Detective Comics #754, Batman: Gotham Knights #13).

He worked on his own comic Bonds, and Beautiful Scars, in collaboration with Guin Thompson. The first two issues of Bonds were released by Image Comics in 2007 and issue No. 3 shipped and completed the series in 2009. Beautiful Scars is an original graphic novel being published by Archaia Studios Press, and will be released in March 2014.

Until August 2007, Talon was an associate professor, in the New Media Program at the School of Informatics at Indiana University-Purdue University Indianapolis, before returning to the Illustration department at Savannah College of Art and Design. Currently, he is The Head Professor of Illustration at Grand Valley State University in Allendale, Mi, USA.

== Bibliography ==
Books

- Panel Discussions: Design in Sequential Art Storytelling (TwoMorrows Publishing, 2002, reprinted July 2007, ISBN 1-893905-14-4)
- Comics Above Ground: How Sequential Art Affects Mainstream Media (TwoMorrows Publishing, 2004, ISBN 1-893905-31-4)

Comics

- Bonds (Image Comics, August 2007) - Interior work
- Beautiful Scars (with Guin Thompson, Original graphic novel, Archaia Studios Press, March 2014, forthcoming) - Interior work
- Batman: Officer Down (DC Comics) - Cover work
- Queen & Country (Oni Press) - Cover work
- Skinwalker (Oni Press) - Cover work

== See also ==
- Upper Deck
- White Wolf, Inc.
- Wizards of the Coast
