= The Tomb (comics) =

Graphic novel (2004)

- Date: 2004
- Main characters: Jessica Parrish
- Publisher: Oni Press

Creative team
- Writers: Nunzio DeFilippis, Christina Weir
- Artist: Christopher Mitten

The Tomb is a graphic novel written by Nunzio DeFilippis and Christina Weir and illustrated by Christopher Mitten. It was published in 2004 by Oni Press.

== Synopsis ==
Jessica Parrish is a down-on-her-luck archaeologist whose last hope of glory is to lead a team of explorers into a tomb that is buried in the most unlikely place — the basement of a New England mansion. The team discover that the house is booby-trapped like an ancient Egyptian tomb. It is also seemingly haunted by ghosts condemned by King Tut's curse.
