= Once in a Blue Moon (comics) =

Once In A Blue Moon

Publication information
- Publisher: Oni Press
- Format: Graphic novels
- Publication date: 2004–present

Creative team
- Created by: Nunzio DeFilippis and Christina Weir (writers)

Once In A Blue Moon is a series of graphic novels published by Oni Press, written by Nunzio DeFilippis and Christina Weir. The first volume was published in 2004 and featured art by Jennifer Quick. The series is currently looking for a new artist and has yet to publish a second volume, but many volumes are planned.

== Publication history ==
The only volume, so far, was published in 2004. With original artist Jen Quick leaving to pursue her own project, there is no news as to when a second volume will be available.

== Plot ==
Once In A Blue Moon is the story of Aeslin Finn, a teenage girl who buys the sequel to a story book that her parents read her when she was young. She never found out what happened next because her father died on a business trip, her mother, stricken with grief, throws away all of her fantasy items, Aeslin manages to save a special toy dragon. Then, years later when she and her best friend read the book, she wishes she was there, and finds herself transported to the kingdom of Avalon. There, she meets up with a tough girl whom she becomes friends with, and the author of the books son, who is chronicling the story. He tells her that it is her destiny to save the kingdom, but she refuses. Then she is transported back into the real world, that the son makes her look bad in the book so she decides to go back and accept her destiny. Back in the real world her mother finds the book and is transported there. She tells her that she was originally the "Dragon Knight" (savior of the kingdom) but fell in love with her dad the prince after she slays the bad guy and goes home and returns to a normal life. Then she finds out that the bad guy wasn't slayed so she and her husband go back on a "business trip" but her father is "killed" by the bad guy but then they find out that he is still alive via the means of a magical flame that will always burn while the current member of the royal family is alive. Her mother pours water on it but it doesn't go out.
