= Maria's Wedding =

2003 graphic novel by Nunzio DeFilippis and Christina Weir

- Author: Nunzio DeFilippis and Christina Weir
- Illustrator: Jose Garibaldi
- Language: English
- Genre: Graphic novel, Comedy-drama
- Publisher: Oni Press
- Publication date: 2003
- Publication place: United States

Maria's Wedding is a graphic novel published by Oni Press, written by Nunzio DeFilippis and Christina Weir, with art by Jose Garibaldi.

== Plot ==
Maria's Wedding is a comedy-drama about a wedding at a large Italian family, the first traditional wedding since the family was split into bickering sides over a gay wedding. Maria's cousin Frankie, whose brother had married another man, has vowed to tell off the family members who were against that wedding, and the family wonders if he will destroy Maria's wedding in the process of carrying out that threat. Complicating matters is the fact that no-one likes Maria's groom, and that Frankie may be more interested in rekindling his romance with Maria's bridesmaid, Brenna.
