= Ramon Tikaram =

British actor (born 1967)

- Born: 16 May 1967 (age 59); Singapore
- Education: University of Kent
- Occupation: Actor
- Years active: 1995–present
- Relatives: Tanita Tikaram (sister), Moti Tikaram (great uncle)

Ramon Tikaram (born 16 May 1967) is a British actor. On television, he is known for his roles in the BBC2 series This Life (1996–1997), the BBC One soap opera EastEnders (2009–2012), the Channel 4 sitcom Man Down (2013–2015), the Sky Atlantic series Fortitude (2015–2017), the DC Universe series Pennyworth (2019–2022), and the Sky One comedy-drama Brassic (2019–2023). His films include Mischief Night (2006) and Endgame (2009).

== Early life and education ==
Tikaram is the son of Pramod Tikaram, an Indo-Fijian officer of the British Army, and Fatimah Rohani, a Sarawakian Malay mother. His younger sister is singer-songwriter Tanita Tikaram. The family moved frequently during Tikaram's youth due to his father's military service with the British army. When not living abroad, Tikaram grew up in Basingstoke. He went to the Duke of York's Royal Military School before studying English at the University of Kent, where he discovered acting.

== Career ==
=== Music and musical theatre ===
In 1992, Tikaram had a recording contract and released two singles followed by the album Chill and Kiss, the latter with musicians including brothers Bill and Ian Nelson on guitar and sax respectively. Tikaram starred as Judas in the West End production of Jesus Christ Superstar from 1997 to 1998. Tikaram performed the role of the King of Siam in a UK tour of the musical The King and I, ending in May 2012.

=== Television and film ===
In 1996–97, he played the recurring character of Ferdy Garcia in the BBC TV series This Life. A 10th-anniversary return of the show in 2006 was based on Ferdy's funeral, and Tikaram therefore did not appear. In 1997, Tikaram was offered a role in the Star Wars prequel trilogy, but refused because it required that he cut his hair. In October 2009, it was announced that Tikaram would appear in the BBC One soap opera EastEnders. He played the part of Qadim Shah, father of the established character Amira Shah. He appeared on-screen in the role from 17 December 2009 to 29 April 2010 in two stints, then returned on 6 September 2011 and 6 January 2012 for short appearances. He appeared as Prendahl in Game of Thrones in 2013. In 2013-2015, Tikaram played the part of Dom in Channel 4 sitcom Man Down. Tikaram also appeared as Inspector Victor Aziz in Pennyworth since it premiered in 2019. Tikaram also appeared as The Baker in Simon Davison's 2023 adaptation of Lewis Carroll's 'The Hunting of the Snark'.

=== Voice acting and narration ===
Tikaram provided voice acting for the character of Gabe Weller in the 2009 video game Dead Space: Extraction. In November 2012, he also provided the voice of World Eaters Captain Macer Varren for the Black Library audio drama Garro: Sword of Truth, part of the long-running Horus Heresy series. He lent his voice for Dorian in Dragon Age: Inquisition, Gein in the cancelled Legacy of Kain: Dead Sun, and Ravindra 'Rav' Chaudhry in Need for Speed Payback. He voiced the roles of Ozzy, Danby, and Second Officer Keen, characters in the 2018 video game Subnautica. In 2018, he took on the role of voicing Aatrox in the video game League of Legends as well as its auto battler counter part Teamfight Tactics. Tikaram continued this role when Aatrox was released in the card game Legends of Runeterra. Tikaram also voiced the role of Godrick The Grafted in the 2022 video game Elden Ring. Tikaram has also narrated a number of audiobooks. Tikaram voices the character Ramattra from the 2022 video game Overwatch 2. He had also narrated a number of Sleep Stories for the Calm app.

== Discography ==
=== Singles ===
- Johnny's Coming Home (1992) German release DSB (Deutsche Schallplatten GmbH Berlin)
- Hey! (1992) German release DSB (Deutsche Schallplatten GmbH Berlin)

=== Album ===
- Chill and Kiss Bill Nelson guitar, Ian Nelson sax on some tracks (1992) German release DSB (Deutsche Schallplatten GmbH Berlin)

== Filmography ==
=== Film ===
Year	Title	Role	Notes
1995	Cutthroat Island	Dawg's Pirate	
1996	Kama Sutra: A Tale of Love	Jai Kumar	
2006	Mischief Night	Immie - Khans	
2006	Take 3 Girls	Seth	
2008	Speed Racer	Casa Cristo Announcer	
2008	Dean Spanley	Nawab of Ranjiput	
2009	Endgame	Aziz Pahad	
2014	Vampire Academy	Mr. Meisner	
2014	Mortadelo and Filemon: Mission Implausible	Conductor (voice)	English version
2015	Jupiter Ascending	Phylo Percadium	
2015	Dragonfly	Flint Lock	
2016	5 Greedy Bankers	Fidel	
2017	Tad the Lost Explorer and the Secret of King Midas	Rackham (voice)	English version
2018	Boogie Man	Deepak	
2022	Fisherman's Friends: One and All	Jez	
2023	The Hunting of the Snark	The Baker	
2025	Fackham Hall	Darvesh Khalid	
2026	Mutiny	Tibu Campallo	

=== Television ===
Year	Title	Role	Notes
1996	Code Name: Wolverine	Nardo	Television film
1996–1997	This Life	Ferdy	21 episodes
1997	Supply & Demand	Irwin	Television film
1997–2016	Casualty	Various roles	5 episodes
2000	Waiting at the Royal	Saresh	Television film
2000	Daylight Robbery	Adrian Harris	4 episodes
2000–2002	Dream Team	Prashant Dattani	47 episodes
2001	Judge John Deed	Adam Parsons	Episode: "Hidden Agenda"
2002	Crossroads	Eddie Weaver	4 episodes
2003	Mile High	Mark Angel	Episode #1.8
2004	Holby City	Gil Waverley	Episode: "Honour Thy Father"
2004	Silent Witness	Rakesh Bhandari	2 episodes
2005	Murder Investigation Team	DI Vince Ruddy	Episode #2.1
2005	Down to Earth	Henry Mayhew	2 episodes
2005	Murphy's Law	Richard Holloway	4 episodes
2005	The Mighty Boosh	Banoo	Episode: "Fountain of Youth"
2005	Nathan Barley	Troll	2 episodes
2005, 2018	Doctors	Jose Rodriguez / Misal Khatib	2 episodes
2006	Krakatoa: The Last Days	Tokaya	Television film
2006	Tripping Over	Dave / Robbie	4 episodes
2006	The Ruby in the Smoke	Maharajah	Television film
2007–2009	My Spy Family	Mr. Vong	29 episodes
2008	Heroes and Villains	Montezuma	Episode: "Cortes"
2008	Wired	Mr. Ralindi	3 episodes
2008–2009	Primeval	Mick Harper	3 episodes
2009–2012	EastEnders	Qadim Shah	11 episodes
2009, 2013	Moving On	Tony / Charan Sarin	2 episodes
2010	Identity	Real / Fake Bansi Dutta	Episode: "Reparation"
2010	Combat Kids	Colin	3 episodes
2011	M.I. High	Quillian Pendrix	Episode: "The First to Crack"
2012	White Heat	Jay (present day)	2 episodes
2012	The Kidnap Diaries	Mr. C	Television film
2013	Father Brown	Umesh Varma	Episode: "The Wrong Shape"
2013	Game of Thrones	Prendahl na Ghezn	Episode: "Second Sons"
2013–2014	Law & Order: UK	Vijay Prasad	2 episodes
2013–2015	Man Down	Dominic	3 episodes
2014, 2016	Happy Valley	Praveen Badal	3 episodes
2015	Stella	Mr. Honey	8 episodes
2015	Gallipoli: When Murdoch Went to War	Narrator	Television film
2015	New Tricks	Evan Langley	Episode: "Life Expectancy"
2015–2017	Fortitude	Tavrani	11 episodes
2015, 2018	Thunderbirds Are Go	Father in Balloon / Kip Harris / Doctor Peck (voice)	3 episodes
2016	Midsomer Murders	Lance Auden	Episode: "A Dying Art"
2016	The Coroner	Don Shapur	Episode: "Pieces of Eight"
2017	Death in Paradise	Oliver Wolf	Episode: "The Secret of the Flame Tree"
2017	Hetty Feather	Chester Benjamin	Episode: "Land of Opportunity"
2018	Shakespeare & Hathaway: Private Investigators	Roman Randall	Episode: "Exit, Pursued by a Bear"
2018	Lee and Dean	Jonty	3 episodes
2018	Flowers	Clive	Episode #2.2
2019	The Victim	Soloman Mishra	4 episodes
2019–2022	Pennyworth	Inspector / Prime Minister Victor Aziz	28 episodes
2019–2023	Brassic	Terence McCann	15 episodes
2020	Feel Good	David	6 episodes
2021	The Great	Uncle Varnya	3 episodes
2022	The Curse	Billy English	3 episodes
2022	Murder They Hope	Neil	Episode: "Can't See the Blood for the Trees"
2024	Love Rat	George	Miniseries, 4 episodes
2024	Renegade Nell	Mr. Honeycomb	Episode: "Tracks Less Well Trod"
2024	Tell Me Everything	Cyrus	5 episodes
2024	Kaos	Charon	5 episodes
2025	Virdee	Jai Pawa	3 episodes
2026	The Split Up	Uncle Rick	episode 3

=== Video games ===
Year	Title	Voice role	Notes
2009	Dead Space: Extraction	Gabe Weller	
2009	League of Legends	Aatrox (Rework)	
2010	Fable III	Vincent / Selan / Auroran Villagers	
2010	James Bond 007: Blood Stone	Bernin	
2011	The Adventures of Tintin: The Secret of the Unicorn	Ben Salaad	
2011	Dead Space 2: Severed	Gabe Weller	
2012	Risen 2: Dark Waters	Pedro	
2014	Dragon Age: Inquisition	Dorian	
2015	Dragon Quest Heroes: The World Tree's Woe and the Blight Below	Velasco	English version
2015	Dragon Age: Inquisition – Jaws of Hakkon	Dorian	
2015	Dragon Age: Inquisition – Trespasser	Dorian	
2016	Hitman	Mr. Fanin	
2017	Raid: World War II	Wolfgang	
2017	Total War: Warhammer II	Malekith the Witch King	
2017	Need for Speed Payback	Ravindra 'Rav' Chaudhry	
2017	Lego Marvel Super Heroes 2	Doctor Strange	
2017	Dark Souls III: The Ringed City	Pygmy King	
2018	Subnautica	Danby / Lifepod 3 Crew / Second Officer Keen / Ozzy	
2018	World of Warcraft: Battle for Azeroth	Kul Tiran Civilian	
2018	Shadows: Awakening	Aknush / Arashad / Archon Medlar / Nobles / Refugees	
2018	Xenoblade Chronicles 2: Torna – The Golden Country	Tornan King / Soldiers	English version
2019	Total War: Three Kingdoms		
2019	GreedFall	Catasach / Other Characters	
2022	Elden Ring	Godrick / Pumpkin Head Berserkers	
2022	Diablo Immortal		
2022	Overwatch 2	Ramattra	
2023	Diablo IV	Additional voices	
2023	Harmony: The Fall of Reverie	Bond	
2023	Final Fantasy XVI		English version
2024	Dragon Age: The Veilguard	Dorian Pavus / Additional voices	
