= Dragon Age: Knight Errant =

Comic book series

- Cover art of the first issue by Sachin Teng

Publication information
- Publisher: Dark Horse Comics
- Format: Limited series
- Publication date: May – September 2017
- No. of issues: 5

Creative team
- Written by: Christina Weir; Nunzio DeFilippis
- Artist(s): Fernando Heinz Furukawa; Sachin Teng (cover)
- Colorist: Michael Atiyeh

Dragon Age: Knight Errant is a five-issue heroic fantasy comic book series set in the Dragon Age universe, published by Dark Horse Comics and released between May and September 2017. The series was co-written by Nunzio DeFilippis and Christina Weir, with artwork by Fernando Heinz Furukawa. The series takes place after the events of Dragon Age: Inquisition – Trespasser and Dragon Age: Magekiller and serves as its sequel. The protagonists of Knight Errant are the elven thief Vaea and Ser Aaron Hawthorne, a drunken washed up Fereldan knight. The series features appearances from secondary characters in the Dragon Age series, such as Varric Tethras and Sebastian Vael.

The series has received a generally positive reception from critics; most expressed satisfaction for the overall quality of the artwork, character writing, and narrative, while some were less enthusiastic about elements which are intentionally added to please the franchise's fanbase.

== Plot ==
The story begins after Dragon Age: Inquisition – Trespasser as Vaea and Ser Aaron Hawthorne arrive in the city state of Kirkwall just in time for the coronation celebration of the city's latest Viscount, Varric Tethras, following his adventures from Dragon Age: Inquisition. Moonlighting as a thief, Vaea follows the roving Ferelden knight's travels to roam the world and unbeknownst to him, uses their act as a cover for her to steal valuable artifacts. Various flashbacks of Vaea's past are depicted in the series, which detail how she came into Ser Aaron's service as his squire. Vaea takes on a seemingly easy job in Kirkwall, but later becomes embroiled in a dangerous recovery mission on behalf of the Inquisition for Marius and Tessa Forsythia, the protagonists of Magekiller who were captured during an Inquisition mission. She is also in danger of having her knight, and her meal ticket, discover the truth about her thievery.

== Publication ==
The Knight Errant series was first announced by Polygon on February 14, 2017; Polygon offered a preview of the comic's first cover, interior art, and story. The first issue's cover art features the visage of Knight Commander Meredith Stannard, the chief antagonist of Dragon Age II, who was petrified and turned into a red lyrium statue by the game's ending sequence. Like Magekiller, Knight Errant features new lead characters who are not connected to previous media.

The series was written by husband and wife team Nunzio DeFilippis and Christina Weir, with art by Fernando Heinz Furukawa, Michael Atiyeh as colorist, and Sachin Teng reprising as cover artist. DeFilippis is the Chair of the New York Film Academy (NYFA) Los Angeles Screenwriting Department and Dean of Faculty, while Weir is an instructor at NYFA.

== Release ==
The Knight Errant series consist of five issues. All five issues of the series have been released digitally on Dark Horse's official website, and were subsequently collected and released as a trade paperback graphic novel, released on January 3, 2018. The Knight Errant series was included in Dragon Age Library Edition Volume 2, an anthology collection of comics released on May 6, 2018. Knight Errant is also included as part of the Dragon Age: The First Five Graphic Novels compilation released on October 27, 2020.

Issue	Date	Pages	Creators
1	10 May 2017	22	Writers: Nunzio DeFilippis and Christina Weir; Artist: Fernando Heinz Furukawa; Colorist: Michael Atiyeh; Cover Artist: Sachin Teng
2	14 June 2017	22	Writers: Nunzio DeFilippis and Christina Weir; Artist: Fernando Heinz Furukawa; Colorist: Michael Atiyeh; Cover Artist: Sachin Teng
3	12 July 2017	22	Writers: Nunzio DeFilippis and Christina Weir; Artist: Fernando Heinz Furukawa; Colorist: Michael Atiyeh; Cover Artist: Sachin Teng
4	16 August 2017	21	Writers: Nunzio DeFilippis and Christina Weir; Artist: Fernando Heinz Furukawa; Colorist: Michael Atiyeh; Cover Artist: Sachin Teng
5	13 September 2017	21	Writers: Nunzio DeFilippis and Christina Weir; Artist: Fernando Heinz Furukawa; Colorist: Michael Atiyeh; Cover Artist: Sachin Teng

== Reception ==
The series as a whole holds a score of 7.6 out of 10 on comics review aggregator Comic Book Roundup, indicating generally favorable reviews, based on 16 reviews by critics of individual issues. Issues #1 and #3 scored 6.4 and 7.4 out of 10 respectively, indicating mixed to average reviews, while all other individual issues received a score of 8 out of 10. Reviewing the first issue for GWW, Percy Waelchl praised Knight Errant for providing a solid setup for a new story within the Dragon Age setting, noting that "the social and political separation of races provides the context for this introductory first issue". He welcomed the writers' decision to focus on new lead characters, "free of the narratives from previous media", which affords them the opportunity to tell their own stories. Todd Young from AIPT scored the first issue 6 out of 10; he found its narrative to be on a smaller scale with a more intimate storyline, commenting in summary that "it delivers familiar fantasy appeal and characters that fan of the franchise will get more out of than newcomers"; Young scored the second issue 7.5, noting that it has more to offer by "giving background to the characters and adding more action, which helped the pacing throughout". In her assessment of the third issue, Lacey Jackson from Bleeding Cool said that both the writing and art are "passable, enjoyable to read, and fluid, just not captivating." She was more critical of the lack of action scenes as well as the fan service aspects of the narrative, commenting that Dragon Age: Knight Errant "is a book for fans and nothing more. I'm not quite sure why anyone would bother with it if they weren't already huge fans of the Dragon Age series. If you like the games and want more of the extended universe, this is the book for you." Reviewing Issue #4, Matthew Mueller from ComicBook.com praised the strong writing which drives the complicated character dynamic between Vaea and Ser Aaron, commenting that "the biggest compliment one can offer is how natural Ser Aaron and Vaea fit into Bioware's rich and beloved universe. Getting to know them has been a delightful experience thus far, and issue #4 teases even more that should get fans excited."

== Sequel ==
Knight Errant is followed by Dragon Age: Deception which retains the same creative team. Deception is set in the Tevinter Imperium and incorporates returning characters from Knight Errant. Its story follows a new protagonist named Olivia Pryde, a failed actress turned con artist.
