= Dorian Pavus =

- Dragon Age character
- Dorian as he appears in Dragon Age: Inquisition.
- First appearance: Dragon Age: Inquisition (2014)
- Created by: David Gaider
- Voiced by: Ramon Tikaram

In-universe information
- Origin: Tevinter Imperium
- Class: Mage
- Specialization: Necromancer

Dorian Pavus is a fictional character in BioWare's Dragon Age franchise. The character made his debut in the 2014 video game Dragon Age: Inquisition, where he serves as a companion and party member. Within the series, he is a human mage from a proud noble bloodline of the Tevinter Imperium, a realm governed by a powerful magic-using magocracy situated in the northern region of Thedas, the continent in which the Dragon Age series is set in. A self-assured man born with magical virtuosity, he is nonetheless considered a pariah as his morals and ideals do not line up with the rest of his family nor the rest of the general populace living in Tevinter. Though he rejects the decadence and corruption which is prevalent throughout Tevinter society, he loves his homeland and wants his vision of a Tevinter where prejudices don't run rampant realized. Seeking to halt what he perceives as the moral decay of his countrymen and the fundamentalist zealotry of his former mentor, he decides to join the Inquisition, believing he could not return without first eliminating the forces corrupting his homeland.

Dorian received a positive reception in Inquisition, with attention drawn to his complex and richly written character, as well as his identities as an openly gay man and person of colour. Dorian is voiced by Ramon Tikaram.

== Character overview ==
A Tevinter native who has a flair for magic that made him the envy of his peers, Dorian knows who he is and what he is capable of, and he revels in it. He is described as "charming and confident", with a wit "as sharp as any blade, and if some suggest his manner cocky, it could be attributed to being a powerful mage in a land where mages rule". Dorian would have been the pride of his family, had he not opposed everything the Tevinter Imperium has come to stand for. He wears the labels of "pariah" and "outcast" proudly, knowing that views of the Imperium are unlikely to change until and unless someone of his ability stands up to make a difference. Despite his cocky and self-absorbed demeanor, Dorian has a troubled past. He grew frustrated and lost respect for his former mentor, Magister Gereon Alexius, once an influential member of the Magisterium who was in favour of reforming the Imperium, now a zealot who has joined an armed cult of Tevinter nationalist supremacists known as the Venatori.

He is a potential romance option for a male Inquisitor. If he is not in a relationship with the Inquisitor and Iron Bull is recruited as a member of the Inquisition, Dorian and Bull may form a relationship with each other, which may last well beyond the ending of the Dragon Age: Inquisition – Trespasser DLC. Dorian's personal storyline in Inquisition included what could be considered an "ex-gay" allegory. His father had attempted to change his sexual orientation by a dismal blood magic ritual, and Dorian responded by running away from home. The player can either choose to help Dorian reconcile with his apologetic father, or to remain estranged.

== Concept and creation ==
"No character ever has to justify why they're straight, white, and male. The moment you make them anything else, you suddenly need reasons why that's okay…or do you? A certain amount of deliberateness is required to challenge the idea of a default, and while it feels a bit unnatural to do so, it's absolutely necessary. It's a way to create without unthinkingly doing things the same way simply because that's how you've always done them."

— David Gaider on his thought process behind Dorian's conception.

Dorian was created and mainly written by David Gaider prior to his departure from BioWare. He is named after the character "Prince Dorian" from the cartoon series The Mighty Hercules, which ran from 1962 to 1966. Gaider explained in an interview that Dorian's sexuality was a natural evolution as the character of a genuinely good mage took shape; after that it was about rounding out the other facets of Dorian as a character. Once he'd taken form, however, BioWare was interested to include this particular character in Inquisition. Gaider further notes that, "it's very little in comparison to the entire rest of the game and thus, considering what it means to those fans who receive that validation almost nowhere else, it's not too much to demand a bit of tolerance and compassion from the portion of the audience for whom this content is not even intended." "Dorian is gay–he is, in fact, the first fully gay character I've had the opportunity to write. It added an interesting dimension to his back story, considering he comes from a place where "perfection" is the face that every mage puts on and anything that smacks of deviancy is shameful and meant to be hidden. Dorian's refusal to play along with that facade is seen as stubborn and pointless by his family, which has contributed to his status as a pariah."

Gaider would later clarify that his previous use of the term "fully gay" was meant to communicate that Dorian would only be a love interest for male characters, where previous romance options would be open to romance from both men and women. He noted in a 2015 interview that his then-colleagues in BioWare, who themselves identified as heterosexual, went ahead and included same-sex relationships into the optional romance subplots for 2005's Jade Empire. This inspired him to be bolder about writing openly gay characters and integrating LGBT themes into the main narratives of the video games he would go on to work on. Gaider acknowledged that the presentation of Dorian's homosexuality may be "controversial in some corners", but said that fans will find him "a fully realized character" in the end.

After he left Bioware in 2016, Gaider wrote and posted a fan fiction story on his Medium account in 2018, which attempts to provide closure about Dorian's handling of his family's matters after his permanent return to the Tevinter Imperium.

=== Visual design ===
"Dorian wears the magic robes of the Imperium, but like a good black sheep, he makes them his own."

— The Art of Dragon Age: Inquisition, page 86

Gaider had explored the idea of a "rock star mage" long before Dorian had a name; his inclusion in Inquisition offers the game's designers an opportunity to explore the visual language of the Tevinter Imperium. Dorian is designed with a view to offer a glimpse of the depth, artistry and richness of Tevinter culture, which is often perceived by the cultures of Southern Thedas as exotic and often menacing. According to the character kit published by Bioware's official blog, Dorian wears an ashen mage's cloak which is embellished with the image of a twisting viper. A satchel is positioned on his belt, which is meant to store reagents. He wears leather gauntlets which provides a solid grip for his staff, so that he could swing it about with good precision. A coiled viper clasp secures his cloak, which is meant to serve as a reminder that the bite of his magic can sting as much as his wit.

Dorian is noted as a gay person of color in a AAA-standard video game. The Lead Narrative Designer of Inquisition, John Epler, once commented that "Indian would be the closest real world analogue" with regard to Dorian's ethnicity.

== Appearances ==
=== Dragon Age: Inquisition ===
The Inquisition will encounter Dorian in two distinctly different scenarios, depending on whether the player decides to recruit the rebel mage faction or the templars to help seal the Breach.

If the Inquisitor travels to Redcliffe, Alexius' son, Felix, secretly passes them a note asking to meet in the Chantry. They will then meet Dorian, who asks for help in sealing a Fade rift which is present inside the Chantry building. After the rift is sealed, Dorian introduces himself and reveals Alexius' allegiance to the Venatori, who are interested in the mark on the Inquisitor's hand. He also reveals that Alexius has invoked time-traveling magic, once thought theoretical back in Tevinter, which is how he arrived at Redcliffe first.

If the Inquisitor chooses to confront Alexius, Dorian will walk in on the war council in Haven, stating he could help the Inquisition's agents infiltrate Castle Redcliffe and outsmart his former mentor. Unfortunately, once they meet Alexius at the Redcliffe Castle, he pulls out an amulet to attempt to travel back in time before the Inquisitor interfered with the Elder One's ritual at the Temple of Sacred Ashes. Dorian interrupts him, but accidentally sending both himself and the Inquisitor one year into the future, where the Elder One rules over southern Thedas. They are able to track down the future Alexius and claim the amulet from him. Using it, the two are able to return to the exact moment they left and defeat Alexius. Afterwards, the Inquisitor may decide to formally recruit Dorian into the Inquisition.

Alternatively, if the Inquisitor has recruited the templars to seal the Breach, Dorian turns up at Haven to help the Inquisition, warning them that the rebel mages are now under control of the Venatori and have arrived at Haven along with the Elder One, now revealed to be the ancient darkspawn and former Tevinter Magister Corypheus. The Inquisitor may decide to formally recruit Dorian into the Inquisition after they move to Skyhold.

After settling in at Skyhold, Mother Giselle informs the Inquisitor of a letter sent by Dorian's father, Halward, asking to meet with the family retainer at the Gull and Lantern in Redcliffe, but asks that they not tell Dorian. The Inquisitor can choose to reveal the letter to Dorian and either convince Dorian not to go or go with him to the tavern. The Inquisitor can also choose not to show Dorian the letter and instead just bring him to the tavern. Upon entering the Gull and Lantern, Dorian is surprised to see his father instead. Dorian gets angry, revealing to the Inquisitor that when his father learned that he was gay and didn't want to keep up appearances by marrying his betrothed, he tried to use a blood magic ritual, which Dorian was taught was "the last resort of the weak mind", to change his sexuality and make him comply with his family's wishes. Halward defended that he wanted what was best for his son, but Dorian retorts that he only cared about himself and his legacy. The Inquisitor can encourage Dorian to try to reconcile with Halward. Halward will then reveal that he feels guilty for having driven Dorian to the Inquisition, and wanted to ask for his forgiveness. Alternatively, the Inquisitor can suggest that they leave instead of talking with Halward, ending the quest. Either way, Dorian is grateful and thanks the Inquisitor for taking him to the meeting.

After the events at the Temple of Mythal, Dorian feels inspired to return to Tevinter. If he was in the party at the Temple, having learned from Abelas that the Imperium didn't destroy Arlathan, he observes that this truth would reflect badly on his countrymen, as it'd reduce their ancestors to scavengers, though he believes that his people must accept the truth. If he wasn't in the party, he remarks on the ancient elven sentinels' survival and states that his countrymen can make amends. For either outcome, he feels that some Tevinter magisters would resist but he believes he can follow the Inquisitor's example.

==== Trespasser ====
In the two years after Corypheus' defeat, Dorian has since become the official Tevinter ambassador to the Inquisition. The Inquisitor re-encounters him at the Winter Palace while he is in the middle of a conversation with the Exalted Council's Orlesian representative, Duke Cyril de Montfort. Dorian explains to the Inquisitor that his father is dead, presumably by assassination, and he is to inherit his seat in the Magisterium, the upper house of the Tevinter Imperial Senate. He indicates he will be permanently departing the Inquisitor's company imminently, and he also states that his friend Maevaris Tilani is making a push for reforms in the Imperium that he'd like to be a part of; Varric Tethras and several of the Inquisitor's companions would hold a farewell toast to Dorian.

=== Other appearances ===
In the lead-up to Inquisition's release, BioWare released character kits for the major characters of Inquisition in order to assist cosplayers.

Dorian appears in Dragon Age: Magekiller, a comic series which runs concurrently with the events of Inquisition. He is sent along with some of the Bull's Chargers to help Marius and Tessa Forsythia clear out the remaining Venatori, whose position has actually grown stronger since the Inquisitor left. Though he is initially wary of Marius, a former Tevinter slave who specializes in killing mages, they work well together and manage to destroy the camp while rescuing the Venatori's captive slaves. Dorian saves Marius' life during the battle, and they part on friendly terms.

Dorian makes a further appearance in Dragon Age: Deception, a comic series which tells the tale of Olivia Pryde, a failed actress turned con artist. Now a full-fledged member of the Magisterium, Dorian meets with Ser Aaron Hawthorne in Ventus to help him with his mission of infiltrating the Qintara estate. In the same tavern, he briefly encounters Olivia Pryde under her guise of Magister Aramis, and her mark-turned-rival Calix, who very unsuccessfully attempts to con him. Later, when Olivia and Calix are confronted by one of their angry marks, Dorian uses his authority as a magister to make the problem go away, enabling Ser Aaron and Vaea to recruit them to infiltrate the Qintara mansion. As Ventus falls to the Qunari, Dorian provides Ser Aaron's group with the means of escaping the city while he stays behind to try and get as many people out as he can.

Heroes of Dragon Age, an iOS and Android game released in 2013, featured Dorian as an unlockable character.

== Reception ==
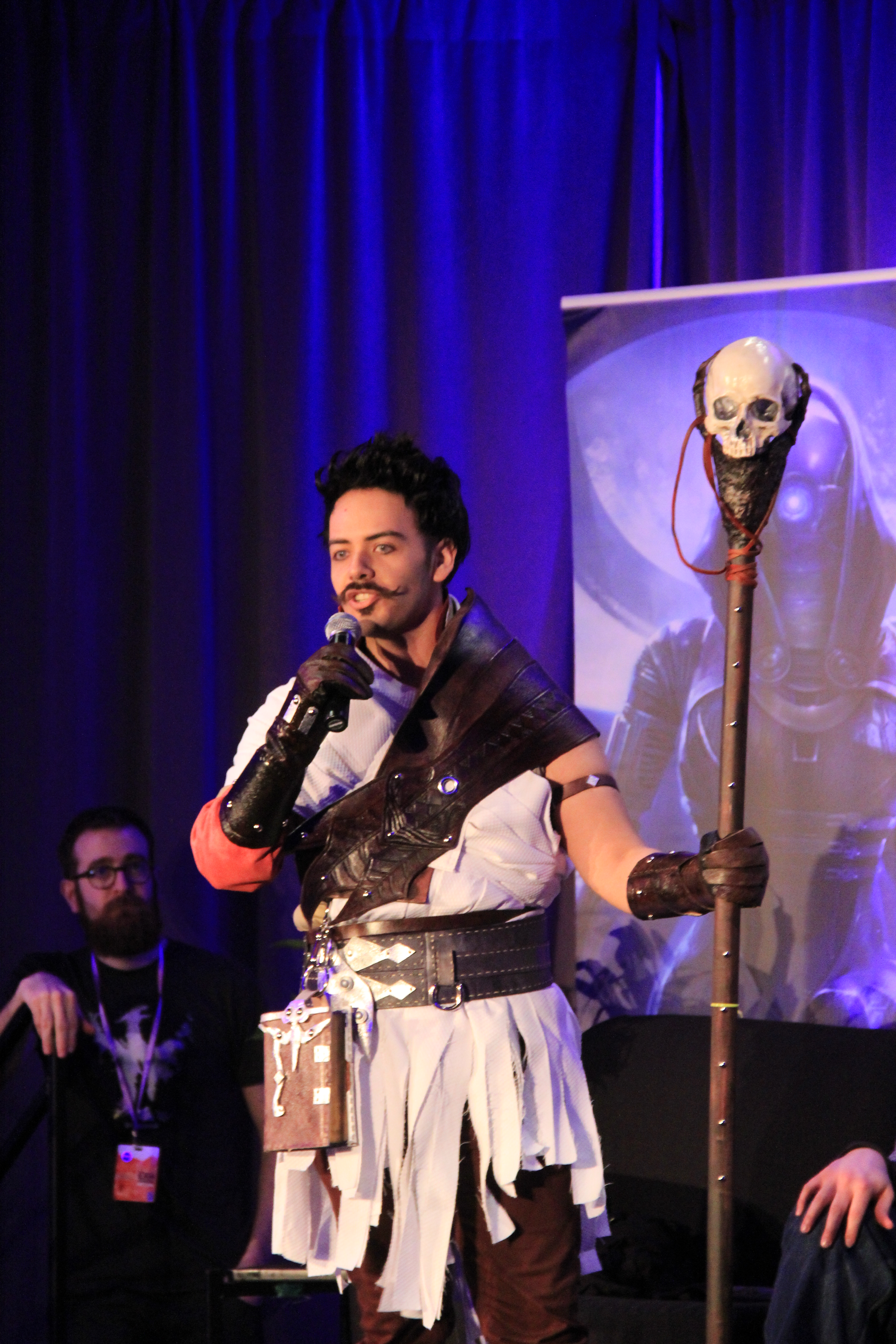
Cosplay of Dorian Pavus at PAX South 2015.

Dorian received a very positive reception from critics, with appearances in multiple "top" character lists. Staff from GamesRadar and PC Gamer ranked Dorian among the most iconic characters in the video game medium. Matt Kane from GLAAD included Dorian and fellow Inquisition characters Krem, Sera and the Iron Bull in his list of 2014's Most Intriguing LGBT Characters. Engadget staff named Dorian among their "Favorite New Characters of 2014" list. In 2015, Logo TV ranked Dorian as the fourth on their list of the sexiest male video game characters. Justin Davis from IGN rated Dorian's moustache as among the most "glorious" examples in video games, describing it as "classy and refined, but maybe just a tiny bit over-the-top".

Some commentators consider Dorian to be a breakout character, specifically as an openly gay male character in the video game medium. Aimee Hart from Techradar said Dorian is a character she would want to see return for any future installments of the Dragon Age series. Paul Tassi from Forbes notes that Dorian is a companion who is a permanent fixture in his party because he was a lot of fun compared to the other party members, and felt that while he was somewhat flamboyant in a possibly stereotypical manner, it was a non-issue given Dorian's strong characterization. Kelly Peirce said Dorian is her favourite among the large LGBT cast of characters in Inquisition; while he is noted to be sharp and fun to chat with no matter the protagonist's gender, some of the most emotional moments for Kelly in Inquisition involved earning Dorian's loyalty for the Inquisitor and learning about his past.

Cian Maher from TheGamer consider Dorian to be "one of the most important characters ever written for a video game", as well as "one of the most prominent LGBTQ characters in contemporary fiction, even outside of video games". Joe Parlock from The Daily Telegraph lamented the lack of proper representation for gay men in video games in a 2016 article. He posited that gaming publishers perceive their audiences as primarily straight males who would respond negatively to seeing male-male romance in their games, leading to video game writers relying on lesbian and bisexual women to cater to diversity instead of being creative about getting their players to care about gay male characters. He reflected on Dorian's portrayal in Inquisition, where his backstory and dialogue fleshed out the numerous experiences he has had because of his being a gay man, which added significantly to his characterization. Gaspard Pelurson noted in his 2018 article Mustaches, Blood Magic and Interspecies Sex: Navigating the Non-Heterosexuality of Dorian Pavus that, "while video games are now catching up on LGBTQ representation, only a few characters are granted a role that is as significant as that of Dorian". The Advocate's Alley Hector notes that his sexuality wasn't merely a player's option but his identity, with his backstory of running away from home after his family tried to make him straight.

Although Dorian is statistically the least popular romance option for the Inquisitor, several critics have lauded the way the character is depicted within the context of Inquisition's romantic side content. Kenneth Shepard from Fanbyte said Dorian's romance subplot is the best among Inquisition's eight options. Emma Osborne, writing for Junkee, concurred and said "there's a real love story in the narrative". Kotaku's Mike Rougeau realised some hours into his playthrough with a male character, that he found Dorian's personality to be more attractive than the two female romance options who are available for a male Inquisitor, and decided to have his character start a romantic relationship with Dorian. Rougeau explains that even though he identifies as heterosexual, he saw this as an opportunity to build empathy and role-play a video game protagonist as something other than an avatar for himself, noting that his character has taken on a life of its own. For The Guardian's Kate Gray, the most "human response" she believed that she ever experienced in a video game, was when Dorian apologized to Kate's female Inquisitor for leading her on and admitting that he couldn't change his sexual orientation or have a romantic relationship with her. Kate explained that her character had previously exchanged flirtatious banter with Dorian repeatedly, but did not realize until Dorian's apology that he was in fact written as a homosexual character. She appreciated the attention to detail by Bioware's writers and noted that somehow, "someone at Bioware had predicted this very situation - that I would fall virtual head over digital heels for the wrong man - and had written heartfelt dialogue just for someone like her".
