= Skinwalker (comics) =

Skinwalker is a comic miniseries published by Oni Press, written by Nunzio DeFilippis and Christina Weir with art by Brian Hurtt. The miniseries follows the investigation of Navajo Tribal Police Officer Ann Adakai and FBI Agent Greg Haworth into a series of murders where the killer has skinned the victim and worn their skin, mystically taking on the victim's features and becoming them. The killer has corrupted the rituals of the Navajo Skinwalkers, a feared witch-like figure in Navajo culture. This leads Officer Adakai to suspect someone outside the tribe is responsible, leading the investigation from Navajo Country all the way to Washington, D.C.

== Publication ==
- Skinwalker (written by Nunzio DeFilippis and Christina Weir, with art by Brian Hurtt, Oni Press, tpb, 2003, ISBN 1-929998-45-7)
