= Nunzio DeFilippis =

American writer of comic books, podcasts, and television

Nunzio DeFilippis is an American writer of comic books, podcasts, and television. He writes with his wife, Christina Weir, whom he met while they were both students at Vassar College.

== Career ==
DeFilippis and Weir have written for two seasons on HBO's Arli$$, and have sold story ideas to the Disney Channel's Kim Possible.

=== Comics ===
In comics, DeFilippis and Weir have written several graphic novels and miniseries for independent publisher Oni Press, including Skinwalker, Three Strikes, Maria's Wedding, The Tomb, Once In A Blue Moon, The Amy Devlin Mysteries, Frenemy of the State (written with Rashida Jones), and Bad Medicine. Their work at Oni led to work at Marvel Comics, relaunching the teen mutant book New Mutants. This book was renamed New X-Men: Academy X. Their run on these books spanned three years and created almost two dozen new super-powered mutant characters for Marvel's X-Men franchise, including Surge, Hellion, Wind Dancer, Prodigy, Wallflower, Elixir, Tag, Rockslide, Mercury, Anole, and Wither.

DeFilippis and Weir have also written for DC Comics, with stories appearing in Wonder Woman, Adventures of Superman and Batman Confidential and Dark Horse with several comic books tying into the world of the videogame Dragon Age, starting with Dragon Age: Knight Errant and continuing with Dragon Age: Deception and Dragon Age: Blue Wraith and concluding with Dragon Age: Dark Fortress. The duo also work in the expanding field of Japanese manga, providing English adaptations for the Del Rey titles Guru-Guru Pon-Chan, Sugar Sugar Rune and Kagetora. They also write original English language manga for Seven Seas Entertainment, writing one of the company's launch titles, Amazing Agent Luna and the pirate manga, Destiny's Hand. DeFilippis also wrote, without his wife, an issue of DC Comics' Detective Comics.

=== Podcast ===
In 2025, DeFilippis and Weir teamed up with Jenny Sterner to create Cheating History a narrative podcast about time travel. A pilot was recorded, starring Winter Bassett, Colette Freedman, David Blixt and John Kassir. It was successfully funded on Kickstarter and will have a full first season in 2026.

=== Teaching ===
DeFilippis taught comic writing at UCLA Extension before teaching screenwriting and comic book writing at the Los Angeles branch of the New York Film Academy, where he is now Chair of the Screenwriting and Producing Departments and Dean of Faculty.

== Selected works ==
- Skinwalker #1-4 (art by Brian Hurtt) (Oni Press, May - September 2002)
- Three Strikes #1-5 (art by Brian Hurtt) (Oni Press, April - October 2003)
- Maria's Wedding graphic novel (art by Jose Garibaldi) (Oni Press, July 2003)
- New Mutants vol. 2 #1-13 (Marvel Comics, July 2003 - June 2004)
- The Tomb graphic novel (art by Christopher Mitten) (Oni Press, July 2004)
- New X-Men: Academy X vol. 2 #1-19 (Marvel Comics (July 2004 - December 2005)
- Amazing Agent Luna vol. 1-11 (Seven Seas Entertainment, 2005–2015)
- New X-Men: Hellions #1-4 (Marvel Comics, July–October 2005)
- Adventures of Superman #644-648 (with Greg Rucka) (November 2005 - March 2006)
- Past Lies: An Amy Devlin Mystery graphic novel (Oni Press, March 2006)
- Destiny's Hand vol. 1-3 (art by Mel Calingo) (Seven Seas Entertainment, 2006–2009)
- Bakugan Battle Brawlers, The Evo Tournament (Del Rey, 2009)
- Batman Confidential #26-28 (DC Comics, April - June 2009)
- All Saints' Day: An Amy Devlin Mystery graphic novel (Oni Press, October 2010)
- Frenemy Of The State (Oni Press, 2010)
- Amazing Agent Jennifer vol. 1-2 (Seven Seas Entertainment, 2011–2012)
- Dracula Everlasting vol. 1-2 (Seven Seas Entertainment, 2011–2012)
- The Avalon Chronicles, Volume 1: Once In A Blue Moon (Oni Press, 2012)
- Play Ball (Oni Press, 2012)
- Bad Medicine (Oni Press, debuted Free Comic Book Day 2012)
- The Avalon Chronicles, Volume 2: Once In A Blue Moon (Oni Press, 2013)
- Dragon Age: Knight Errant (Dark Horse, 2017)
- Dragon Age: Deception (Dark Horse, 2018)
- Dragon Age: Blue Wraith (Dark Horse, 2020)
- Dragon Age: Dark Fortress (Dark Horse, 2021)
- Cheating History (Tavern Trio LLC, 2025)
