= Surge (Marvel Comics) =

Marvel Comics superhero

- Surge as depicted in New X-Men #43 (December 2007). Art by Skottie Young.

Publication information
- Publisher: Marvel Comics
- First appearance: New Mutants (vol. 2) #8 (January 2004)
- Created by: Nunzio DeFilippis; Christina Weir; Keron Grant

In-story information
- Alter ego: Noriko "Nori" Ashida
- Species: Human mutant
- Team affiliations: New Mutants training squad; X-Men in training; New X-Men; Xavier Institute; Jean Grey School Students
- Abilities: Electrical generation and manipulation; Superhuman speed

Noriko "Nori" Ashida is a superhero appearing in the American comic books published by Marvel Comics. Created by writers Nunzio DeFilippis, Christina Weir, and artist Keron Grant, the character first appeared in New Mutants vol. 2 #8 (January 2004). Ashida is known under the codename Surge. She is a mutant—a subspecies of humans born with superhuman abilities—who possesses electrical superpowers. She is also a student at the Xavier Institute and a former member of the New Mutants team.

== Publication history ==
Noriko Ashida debuted in New Mutants, vol. 2 #8 (January 2004), and was created by Nunzio DeFilippis, Christina Weir, and Keron Grant. She subsequently appeared in several Marvel series, appearing as a main character in the 2024 series X-Force. She also appeared in Age of X-Man: The Amazing Nightcrawler (2019), House of X (2019), and Bishop: War College (2022).

In January 2022, Marvel Comics ran a voting contest where voters could pick between one of ten characters to join the X-Men, with Surge being among the candidates. In July 2022, Surge appeared in a digital comic released as a companion to the second Hellfire Gala. This comic revealed that the election had also been held in-universe, with Surge losing the vote.

== Fictional character biography ==
Noriko Ashida was born in Japan. She was close to her brother, Keitaro, but she ran away from home after her powers manifested; she claimed that her father "doesn't believe in mutants". How she came to the United States is unknown, but she ended up homeless on the streets of Salem Center, reduced to buying illegal drugs to calm her powers, using stolen money. With no training or practice in the use of her powers, Noriko's body automatically absorbs all nearby electricity and, once fully charged, releases it in a storm of electrical bolts.

With no training or practice in the use of her powers, Noriko's body automatically absorbs all nearby electricity and, once fully charged, releases it in a storm of electrical bolts. Additionally, her acceleration ability forces her to speak so quickly that no one can understand her. Though she finds no treatment for most of these problems, the drugs sedate her body enough that she can control her outbursts of electrical power. Keeping herself regularly supplied proves impossible, however, and during a robbery, Noriko accidentally hits the young owner of a coffee shop with an electric bolt. A group of young mutants find her and bring her back to the X-Mansion. There, Beast designs gauntlets that regulate her absorption of ambient electricity and discharge as required to prevent further mental overloads.

Noriko becomes a student of the Xavier Institute and is assigned to the New Mutants squad led by Danielle Moonstar. Marvel writer Christopher Yost has stated that, "Surge is the right candidate, because she wants it the least. And you'll see, it's taking a big toll on her. Being a leader when you're doing team sports and field day exercises is one thing, but leading when the stakes are life and death is another thing."

Noriko retains her powers after the events of "House of M". Most of the remaining students are organized into a melee fight to determine who would become a member of Emma Frost's X-Men-in-training. Noriko is chosen by Frost to be the team's leader. Soon afterwards, Noriko receives new, lighter, and more effective gauntlets from Forge.

Surge joins her fellow mutants on Utopia. Surge remains with Cyclops after X-Men: Schism. She is placed in the custody of the Avengers during Avengers vs X-Men, joins the Jean Grey School for Higher Learning after Cyclops' defeat, and shelters in X-Haven during the Inhumans vs X-Men event. She is transported to a different plane of reality during Age of X-Man.

After being freed from the other plane, Surge joins mutantkind on Krakoa. After the fall of Krakoa, Surge joins Forge's X-Force in the X-Men: From the Ashes line of books.

== Powers and abilities ==
Noriko Ashida possesses the mutant ability to absorb and control electricity. She naturally draws in ambient electrical energy—from minor static charges to large-scale electrical attacks—and stores it within her body. Once charged, she can release this energy as powerful lightning blasts or channel it to enhance her physical speed and reflexes. Because her absorption is involuntary and potentially dangerous, she typically relies on specially designed gauntlets to regulate and safely discharge the excess electricity.

== Other versions ==
=== House of M ===
An alternate universe version of Noriko Ashida appears in the House of M tie-in New X-Men: Academy X. This version is a junior agent of S.H.I.E.L.D. and the daughter of a human terrorist father, who she was separated from at a young age. Due to her father's involvement during one of the group's missions, Ashida is ousted from the Hellions and replaced with Magik.

=== Ultimate Universe ===
An alternate universe version of Noriko Ashida from Earth-6160 appears in Ultimate X-Men (2024).

== In other media ==
- Surge appears in Marvel Disk Wars: The Avengers, voiced by Kokoro Kikuchi in the Japanese version and Stephanie Sheh in the English dub. This version's hair is naturally blue and is initially a student of Techno Isle's International Academy. After briefly becoming romantically attracted to Hikaru Akatsuki, she leaves for the Xavier Institute with Wolverine to receive protection from Magneto.
- Surge will appear in the third season of X-Men '97.
- Surge appears in X-Men: Destiny, voiced by Aileen Casas.
- Surge appears as a playable card in Marvel Snap.
