= Iron Bull =

Fictional character from Dragon Age video game

The Iron Bull
- Dragon Age character
- Render of Iron Bull's character model from Dragon Age: Inquisition.
- First appearance: Dragon Age: Inquisition (2014)
- Voiced by: Freddie Prinze Jr.

In-universe information
- Alias: Hissrad
- Race: Qunari
- Home: Par Vollen
- Class: Warrior
- Specialization: Reaver

The Iron Bull is a fictional character in BioWare's Dragon Age franchise. He appears in the 2014 video game Dragon Age: Inquisition, where he serves as a companion party member. He is a Qunari, a member of metallic-skinned race of large humanoids who live in the northern part of Thedas, the setting of the Dragon Age series, that venerates a civil religion known as The Qun. He is a spy commissioned by the Ben'Hassrath, the secret police of the Qunari government, to operate in southern Thedas. As part of his cover, he leads a mercenary company known as the Bull's Chargers. Freddie Prinze Jr. voices the character.

The Iron Bull's critical reception has been positive, with Prinze praised for his voice acting. Various merchandise has been made around him, including T-shirts, character dolls and collectible statues coins too .

== Character overview ==
The Iron Bull is a Qunari, literally "People of the Qun" in their native language. Within series lore, it is an umbrella term used in Thedas, the setting of the Dragon Age series, to describe the society that governs the settlements where these beings reside. "The Iron Bull" is not his real name, but a nickname he chose for himself; this is because the Qunari do not have a concept of personal identity, using their job titles instead of names. If the protagonist meets Gatt, a former elven slave and a convert to the Qun (known as a "Viddathari") whom Bull nicknamed and recruited in the past, he reveals that the Iron Bull is in fact known as Hissrad (meaning "one who creates illusion" or "liar") among his own people. The Iron Bull used to hunt spies, rebels, and deserters on behalf of his superiors prior to being transferred to Orlais to gather intelligence and collate reports on behalf of the Ben-Hassrath. While he still maintains his duties to the Qunari government, he has become accustomed to life outside of the teachings of the Qun, such as indulging in hedonistic pursuits or maintaining interpersonal relationships.

After the protagonist of Inquisition gained renown as the so-called Herald of Andraste, the Iron Bull eventually joins the organisation they lead, the Inquisition, to act as a double agent on instructions from the Qunari leadership. He openly admits this to the Herald during their initial meeting, having anticipated that the Inquisition would eventually discover his duplicity; this effectively makes him the Qunari's representative within the Inquisition if he is accepted into the organisation. The player may gain insight into Qunari culture, physiology, society, and politics by conversing with the Iron Bull, though he reveals little about himself in any specific individual sense.

== Conception and creation ==
The Iron Bull is written by Patrick Weekes; Weekes stuck to movie soundtracks for most of his writing involving the Iron Bull, as they do not usually contain lyrics, and fades into comfortable mood music quickly enough for him that he could handle the same several albums and be fine. Weekes' playlist includes original motion picture soundtracks for The Avengers, Battle: Los Angeles, Captain America: The First Avenger, Iron Man 3, Thor, Salt, and the expanded score for Transformers.

The Iron Bull's character concept was primarily developed by Casper Konefal; art director Matt Goldman delegated the task to Konefal. He bears a set of horns deemed to be impressive even by the standards of his species. His battle-scarred body is sporadically covered by leather armor; loose pantaloons and leather boots give him the agility he needs in battle. He is one-eyed and covers the other eye with an eye patch.

Konefal said the first thing that came to his mind when designing the character was a "hulking giant of a warrior that had a career ending disability to over come". He wanted the Iron Bull to have "something more to his character", a challenging trait which showed his strength both physical and mental. Noting the underrepresentation of people with disabilities in entertainment media, Konefal had at one point considered making Iron Bull a warrior who had suffered a crippling loss of one of his fighting hands, and thought that "it would be cool to change that." Reflecting on his design work for the character, Casper notes that he always had an image of the Iron Bull "grabbing his sword by the hilt with his good hand, smashing it down on an enemy still in the sheath, the sword sheath and all cutting half way down the guy then Iron Bull using that to pull the sword out of the sheath and fight on". One iteration had the Iron Bull's hand outfitted with a cannon prosthesis. Design work for a unique fighting style was eventually discontinued due to budget and technical constraints.

== Appearances ==
Iron Bull is the central focus of a 2014 cinematic trailer, where he appears alongside The Bull's Chargers, promoting the release of Inquisition which was uploaded on multiple EA-affiliated channels. Like most of Inquisition's companions, recruiting the Iron Bull is optional. Iron Bull is designed as a pansexual character. If he is pursued as a romantic interest, the Iron Bull will reveal his interest in consensual adult sadomasochistic activity.

The Iron Bull may be recruited if the player character, the Herald of Andraste, initiates a conversation with Krem after he appears at Inquisition's base of operations in the village of Haven. Krem conveys the Iron Bull's interest in having their mercenary company being retained by the Inquisition as its agents. The Inquisition may then travel to the Storm Coast region in Ferelden to meet the Chargers. The Iron Bull will openly admit to working with the Ben-Hassrath after his initial meeting with the Herald of Andraste, and he will explain that he will be relaying information about the Breach and Inquisition to them at certain points. However, he will also relay information to the Inquisition as well. If the protagonist is Qunari, the Iron Bull will burst out in laughter; they have heard that the Herald of Andraste is in fact a Qunari mercenary, which Bull initially brushed off as a fanciful rumour. Should the Iron Bull be hired, he can be found outside of Haven by the stables, and later in the main courtyard in Skyhold, before he eventually winds up in the tavern.

Following the Inquisition's relocation to Skyhold, Bull later informs the Herald of Andraste, now leading the organisation as its Inquisitor, that the Ben-Hassrath recognize the threat the Venatori, led by an ancient being known as Corypheus, pose and willing to offer an alliance. To that end, they set up a joint effort to attack a Venatori smuggling operation on the Storm Coast. Upon arrival, the party meets with Bull's contact, Gatt. After detailing the plan for a Qunari dreadnought to ambush the smuggling vessel before it reaches open waters. the Inquisitor's party, which includes Bull and Gatt, and the Chargers would separately takes two hills where the Venatori are stationed so their mages can't sink the dreadnought. Bull assigns the Chargers what he believed to be "the easy job", but a large Venatori force began advancing on their position. Gatt insisted that the Chargers hold the hill, otherwise the dreadnought would be destroyed. Bull will defer to the Inquisitor to decide whether or not to sacrifice the Chargers. If the Inquisitor signal the Chargers to retreat, the dreadnought is destroyed; the possibility of an alliance between the Qunari and the Inquisition ceases, while the Iron Bull is cast out and becomes Tal-Vashoth (literally meaning "True Grey One"). If Bull is told to sacrifice the Chargers, the mission ends in success; the Inquisition remains allied to the Qunari and the Iron Bull affirms his faith in the Qun. He is however deeply affected by the deaths of the Chargers and later collects their remains so that he could perform Qunari funeral rites.

In the Trespasser DLC, the Iron Bull returns to attend the Exalted Council, two years after Corypheus is defeated. Depending on whether the player has completed his personal quest and if so, whether the Chargers were saved or sacrificed as the outcome of the quest, the Iron Bull may or may not betray the Inquisition to side with the invading Qunari.

== Reception and analysis ==
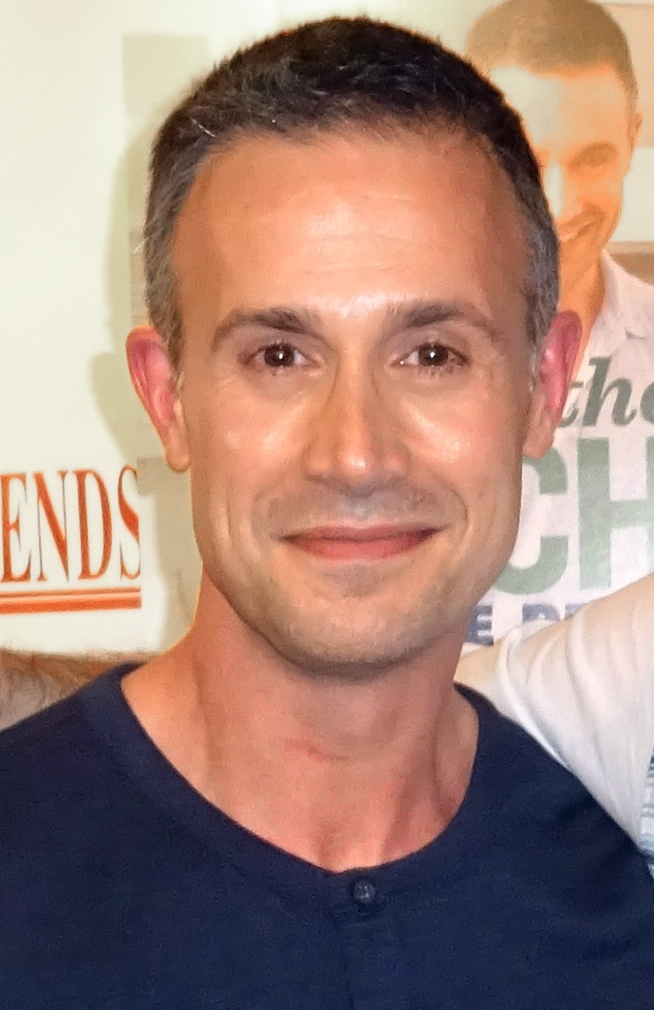
Freddie Prinze Jr. has received acclaim for his performance as the Iron Bull.

The Iron Bull was very well received, and gained accolades for his appearance in Inquisition. He is considered Inquisition's best party member by various sources. He was named Best New Character of the Year for Giant Bomb's 2014 Game of the Year Awards. Iron Bull was a nominee for Most Memorable Character for New Game Network's Game of the Year Awards 2014. Commentators found his characterization as a self-confident figure who is irreverent and eccentric to be appealing.

Kirk Hamilton, the editor-in-chief of Kotaku, described the Iron Bull as "a thoughtful, wry killer whose joie de vivre and reckless enthusiasm for danger make him an all-but-essential party member for adventures out in the field". Kate Gray observed that he started off as a witty yet slightly cold Qunari warrior that towers imposingly over the rest of the party companions, but "get to know him through the complex and engaging romance system and you'll discover the heart of a teddy bear underneath all that bravado". His interactions with an Inquisitor who is of Qunari background is praised as interesting by Giant Bomb, noting that "in a game rooted in class and racial warfare, watching Iron Bull criticize your own upbringing roots the game's politicization in surprisingly electric waters".

Alec Meer said he was fascinated by Iron Bull's visual design, noting that he's "...both muscley and fat; sometimes he looks like horned Adonis, sometimes he looks like Obelix wearing a Goth hat". He comments that the Iron Bull's design does not resemble the typical archetype or image of male warrior characters in massive fantasy adventures. Describing the character as "both grotesque and magnificent", he notes that the character is "clearly raw power, but I badly want to know just how far out that belly will flop if he ever takes off that girdle". Alec also commented on the design of his nipples, "The pecs are like fatty paving slaps, sure, but those are some pretty damn big nipples too. They're wider than his chin. They's so low-slung. Almost an udder. What is the story of the nipples, and of the vast, almost tectonic chest-squares on which they sit? Why are they so mesmeric despite looking kind of awful?".

The character's sexuality has invited commentary from several critics. Hassan treated Iron Bull as part of Inquisition's expansion of non-heterosexual representation, identifying him as a bisexual Qunari romance option within a cast whose relationships vary according to the player character's gender and race, and argues more broadly that the game's diversity of racial and sexual identities operates within continuing constraints on gender representation. Gaspard Pelurson, writing in Game Studies, separately analyses the possible relationship between Iron Bull and Dorian Pavus as a queer interspecies pairing, arguing that the pairing allows readings of non-normative sexuality that move beyond human categories of gay and straight identity. Matt Kane of GLAAD praised the Iron Bull's characterization, noting that "not only will he school the player on using respectful language if they misgender Krem, Bull is also openly bisexual and will end up dating Dorian (provided both characters are in the party long enough) if the player doesn't pursue either of them for a romance. Iron Bull demonstrates that classic, masculine video game archetypes and progressive views on human nature are not mutually exclusive". He included Bull and fellow Inquisition characters Krem, Dorian Pavus and Sera in his list of 2014's Most Intriguing LGBT Characters.

Kate Gray was surprised by the Iron Bull's enthusiasm for BDSM, a topic she was not expecting to find in a AAA game. She praised the character's insistence on obtaining informed consent from the player character before engaging them in any sexual activity. Gita Jackson, writing for Kotaku, noted thatt the character is "very open about being dominant in bed and he's respectful of your boundaries". Elizabeth Sampat notes that there is a healthy BDSM relationship dynamic between Iron Bull and his sexual partners, with "frank and open communication, safe words, and aftercare". She observes that the Iron Bull does not treat transgender people any differently from cisgender people, and she believes that this strongly implies that Qunari sex culture, at least as told from the Iron Bull's perspective, is generally queer with little to no regard to gender. Various sources have called a sex scene involving the character as one of the funniest moments in Inquisition.

Prinze's performance as The Iron Bull has drawn unanimous praise from Bioware's developers and video game journalists. Gita Jackson of Kotaku is amused by the fact that the Iron Bull "is roughly the size of a truck and voiced by a 90s teen heartthrob". Lucas Sullivan of Gamesradar praised Prinze's performance, stating "anyone who says they can't be charmed by Freddie Prinze Jr.'s deep, dulcet voice is a bold-faced liar". Hamilton concluded that the Iron Bull steals the show due to the combination of a good script and a lusty performance by Prinze, and that he "knocks it out of the park"; a sentiment shared by Mike Laidlaw, former creative director of the Dragon Age series.

== See also ==
- List of fictional double agents
