= Dragon Age: Inquisition – Trespasser =

- Developer: BioWare
- Publisher: Electronic Arts
- Series: Dragon Age
- Engine: Frostbite 3
- Platforms: Microsoft Windows; PlayStation 4; Xbox One
- Release: September 8, 2015
- Genre: Action role-playing
- Mode: Single-player

Dragon Age: Inquisition – Trespasser is a downloadable content (DLC) pack developed by BioWare and published by Electronic Arts for the 2014 action role-playing video game Dragon Age: Inquisition. It was released for Xbox One, PlayStation 4, and Microsoft Windows through Electronic Arts' digital distribution platform Origin, on September 8, 2015.

Trespasser follows members of the Inquisition as they uncover a conspiracy to invade southern Thedas, while at the same time being confronted over their relevancy as an organization two years after a cataclysmic series of events which unfolded in Inquisition. As the Inquisition works to undermine a secret invasion by the Qunari, its leadership will eventually have to decide whether the organization itself should continue to exist.

Trespasser is the final major single-player narrative DLC pack released for Dragon Age: Inquisition, and sets up a story thread which connects Inquisition to its sequel, Dragon Age: The Veilguard. It received positive reviews from video game publications.

== Gameplay ==
Trespasser is a downloadable content (DLC) pack for the 2014 action role-playing video game Dragon Age: Inquisition. The player assumes the role of the Inquisitor, who is initially viewed by many in Thedas, the world setting of the Dragon Age franchise, as a messianic figure due to a supernatural 'mark' on their hand known as the Anchor, which enabled them to repel a demonic invasion by restoring the metaphysical boundaries between the physical world and the spiritual realm known as the Fade. As the leader of the paramilitary organization known as the Inquisition, the Inquisitor defeated the ancient Darkspawn mage known as Corypheus and ended the Mage-Templar War as well as the Orlesian Civil War two years prior to the events of Trespasser. However, the Inquisition is increasingly seen as having outlived its usefulness by the sovereign nation states of Thedas.

A gameplay screenshot showing the Inquisitor's party fighting Saarath, a Qunari mage, with companions Dorian, Sera and Cassandra. The player is required to use the Anchor's powers to conclude the boss fight.

Players must utilize a character that has completed the ending of the main game's narrative in order to access the pack's contents. Since Trespasser is the definitive epilogue to the story of Inquisition, players will no longer have access to Skyhold, the Inquisition's base of operations, and any open quests from the main game will be abandoned. The pack is focused on delivering a story-driven gameplay experience punctuated with a wide range of in-universe lore, and follows the Inquisitor as they embark on one final mission with their companions. Trespasser also adds an optional gameplay mode which is intended to be challenging in terms of gameplay difficulty, new cosmetic options for player characters, and a "Golden Nug" statue which allows players to keep all their acquired schematics and recipes through the synchronization of in-game data.

The premise of Trespasser involves the Inquisition's return to the Winter Palace located in the Orlesian city of Halamshiral to engage in diplomatic talks with the leadership of Ferelden and Orlais regarding its future. The Inquisition's primary opponents in Trespasser are the Qunari, a civilization of large, horned humanoid beings who live in the northern part of Thedas. The Inquisition will travel to various locations in Thedas via the Eluvian network, and uncover lore which delve into the "secrets of the Fade". The conclusion of Trespasser expands upon the original endings of Inquisition, and provides additional epilogues explaining the fates of the Inquisitor's companions, advisors and other supporting characters.

== Development and release ==
On August 29, 2015, during PAX Prime 2015, BioWare announced the imminent release of Trespasser. Then-creative director at Bioware, Mike Laidlaw, previously noted that BioWare was humbled by Inquisition's positive reception and intended to support the game with further DLC content. Unlike the lighthearted tone presented by a DLC pack like Mass Effect 3: Citadel, Trespasser explores "the tensions of a world that no longer needs a savior", offers "hints at what might come next" in the franchise, and allows players to define the legacy of their player characters. Laidlaw compared the political tensions presented in Trespasser to the Krogan genophage storyline in the Mass Effect series, and noted that the good the organization can do is sharply contrasted against the potential threat they may pose as a powerful, border-crossing and self governing organization. An earlier version of the story involved Sten, the qunari companion from Dragon Age: Origins arriving to apprehend the Inquisitor, and Skyhold, the player's base of operations, being destroyed by explosives.

Trespasser was released on September 8, 2015, for Microsoft Windows, PlayStation 4, and Xbox One. It is made available for download via access codes bundled with physical copies of the Game of the Year edition of Inquisition for PC, PlayStation 4 and Xbox One, released on October 6, 2015.

== Plot ==
Two years after the events of the main campaign, the Inquisition arrives at the Winter Palace to attend a summit at the request of the recently elected Divine Victoria. A council is assembled to determine the role of the Inquisition now that the Breach has been closed and Thedas is at peace. A dead Qunari warrior is found during the talks, leading the Inquisitor to investigate the presence of Eluvians, magical mirror artifacts, in the palace.

The Inquisitor discovers a Qunari plot to invade southern Thedas using the Eluvians and proselytize its people to the Qun, the collectivist philosophy which governs Qunari society. Notes indicate that a mysterious elven "agent of Fen'Harel" has been disrupting the Qunari's plans. During this time, the Inquisitor's Anchor begins to flare up uncontrollably. The Inquisition is confronted by the Viddasala, a high-ranking Qunari leader who accuses Solas, a former companion who departed the Inquisition after Corypheus' defeat, of disrupting their plans and manipulating the Inquisition into opposing the Qunari.

After traveling through the Eluvians and defeating the Qunari, the Inquisitor encounters Solas, who petrifies the Viddasala. Solas reveals that he is Fen'Harel and had created the Veil — the metaphysical boundary between the physical world and the Fade — to imprison the other ancient elven gods after they abused their power. Regretful at causing the downfall of the elves (whose society was dependent on the presence of the Fade), Solas states his intentions to collapse the Veil and restore the world of the ancient elves, an act which will likely destroy the current state of the world in turn. He also reveals that he warned the Inquisition about the Qunari threat because, despite what he plans to do, he'd rather the world live in the peace it has left. He also confirms that he has placed agents in the Inquisition, which is now growing corrupt. The Inquisitor may declare their intention to either kill or redeem Solas. Solas ultimately amputates the Inquisitor's arm to prevent the Anchor from killing them and leaves. Back at the council, the Inquisitor either disbands the Inquisition or restructures it into a peacekeeping organization under the oversight of the Divine.

In a post-epilogue scene, the Inquisitor resolves to find allies who are beyond Solas' influence, marking the location of the Tevinter Imperium on a map of Thedas.

== Reception ==
Reception

Aggregate score
Aggregator	Score
Metacritic	77/100 (PC)

Review scores
Publication	Score
GameRevolution	9/10
Hardcore Gamer	8/10
IGN	7/10
PC Gamer (US)	7.7/10
Forbes	9/10

According to the review aggregator Metacritic, the Microsoft Windows version of Trespasser received generally favorable reviews from video game publications.
