= Christina Weir =

American writer of comic books and television

Christina Weir is an American writer of comic books and television. She writes with her husband, Nunzio DeFilippis, whom she met while they were both students at Vassar College.

== Career ==
Weir and DeFilippis have written for two seasons on HBO's Arli$$, and have sold story ideas to the Disney Channel's Kim Possible.

In comics, Weir and DeFilippis have written several graphic novels and miniseries for independent publisher Oni Press, including Skinwalker, Three Strikes, Maria's Wedding, The Tomb, Once In A Blue Moon, the Amy Devlin Mysteries, Frenemy Of The State (written with Rashida Jones), and Bad Medicine. Their work at Oni led to work at Marvel Comics, relaunching the teen mutant book New Mutants. This book was renamed New X-Men: Academy X. Their run on these books spanned three years and created almost two dozen new super-powered mutant characters for Marvel's X-Men franchise, including Surge, Hellion, Wind Dancer, Prodigy, Wallflower, Elixir, Tag, Rockslide, Mercury, Anole, and Wither. They have also written for DC Comics, with stories appearing in Wonder Woman, Adventures of Superman and Batman Confidential.

Weir and DeFilippis also work in the expanding field of Japanese manga, providing English adaptations for the Del Rey titles Guru-Guru Pon-Chan, Sugar Sugar Rune, and Kagetora. They also write original English language manga for Seven Seas Entertainment, writing one of the company's launch titles, Amazing Agent Luna and the pirate manga, Destiny's Hand as well as Dracula Everlasting.

== Selected works ==
- Skinwalker #1-4 (art by Brian Hurtt) (Oni Press, May - September 2002)
- Three Strikes #1-5 (art by Brian Hurtt) (Oni Press, April - October 2003)
- Maria's Wedding graphic novel (art by Jose Garibaldi) (Oni Press, July 2003)
- New Mutants vol. 2 #1-13 (Marvel Comics, July 2003 - June 2004)
- The Tomb graphic novel (art by Christopher Mitten) (Oni Press, July 2004)
- New X-Men: Academy X vol. 2 #1-19 (Marvel Comics (July 2004 - December 2005)
- Amazing Agent Luna vol. 1-7 (Seven Seas Entertainment, 2005–2011)
- New X-Men: Hellions #1-4 (Marvel Comics, July–October 2005)
- Adventures of Superman #644-648 (with Greg Rucka) (November 2005 - March 2006)
- Past Lies: An Amy Devlin Mystery graphic novel (Oni Press, March 2006)
- Destiny's Hand vol. 1-3 (art by Mel Calingo) (Seven Seas Entertainment, 2006–2009)
- Bakugan Battle Brawlers, The Evo Tournament (Del Rey, 2009)
- Batman Confidential #26-28 (DC Comics, April - June 2009)
- All Saints' Day: An Amy Devlin Mystery graphic novel (Oni Press, October 2010)
- Amazing Agent Jennifer vol. 1-2 (Seven Seas Entertainment, 2011–2012)
- Dracula Everlasting vol. 1-2 (Seven Seas Entertainment, 2011–2012)
- The Avalon Chronicles, Volume 1: Once In A Blue Moon (Oni Press, 2012)
- Play Ball (Oni Press, 2012)
- Bad Medicine (Oni Press, debuted Free Comic Book Day 2012)
