= Zevran =

Fictional character from the Dragon Age video game series

Zevran Arainai
- Dragon Age character
- First appearance: Dragon Age: Origins (2009)
- Created by: David Gaider
- Voiced by: Jon Curry

In-universe information
- Race: Elf
- Home: Antiva City
- Class: Rogue

Zevran Arainai, also known mononymously as Zevran, is a character in BioWare's Dragon Age series. He first appears in the 2009 video game Dragon Age: Origins as a companion character and an elf assassin trained by the Antivan Crows, a guild of assassins operating from the nation of Antiva in Northern Thedas, the setting of Dragon Age. After failing an attempt to assassinate the player-controlled protagonist, Zevran can join their party. He is one of the game's romance options and can pursue a relationship with protagonists regardless of gender. Supplementary material later expanded on the background described by Zevran in Origins, including his early life in Antiva and his recruitment and training by the Antivan Crows, and provides further context for the assassination attempt against the protagonist.

Zevran was originally envisioned by writer David Gaider as a gay character before the romance was changed to bisexual during development. Gaider described his characterisation as a charismatic and pragmatic assassin whose confidence and humour contrast with his experiences as a contract. His background as an elf, assassin and social outsider has also been analysed in relation to the literary tradition of the rogue.

Later retrospectives and academic criticism has continued to discuss Zevran as part of the broader significance and limitations of Dragon Age: Origins' approach to queer romance through Zevran's relationship mechanics and bisexual representation, including both the increased visibility of queer intimacy in role-playing games and criticism that aspects of his portrayal draw on stereotypes.

== Concept and creation ==
Zevran was created and written by David Gaider for Dragon Age: Origins. Gaider recalled that the character was developed relatively late in production, as the writing team was finalising the game's group of companions. Alistair and Morrigan had already been established when Gaider began considering the two rogue companions. The female rogue concept was taken on by writer Sheryl Chee, while Gaider developed the male rogue who became Zevran. Gaider linked this period of development to BioWare's experience with Jade Empire, whose inclusion of same-sex romance options had demonstrated that such relationships could be incorporated into one of the studio's role-playing games.

Gaider initially proposed making Zevran gay. The idea drew partly on material he had read about gay men and intelligence work, which suggested to him the concept of a gay assassin. Lead designer James Ohlen instead proposed making Zevran bisexual, allowing the same romance option to be available to protagonists of either sex. Gaider reflected in retrospect that the decision was not discussed by the team in terms of representation or diversity; he had previously assumed that his own sexuality and his work in games would remain separate. He described Zevran's bisexuality as a practical compromise that nevertheless resulted in queer relationships becoming part of the game's companion and romance systems.

Gaider wrote Zevran as a character who is "fun" and "a bit nihilistic". He was conscious that Zevran's overt flirtatiousness risked becoming stereotypical for modern sensibilities. Rather than removing those traits, he developed Zevran as a humorous and sexually confident contrast to Alistair. Gaider later explained that Zevran's readiness to flirt or have sex was also intended to reflect how the character understood his own value to other people: sex was something he knew how to offer, whereas genuine emotional intimacy left him less certain of himself. The romance consequently develops from an initially casual relationship towards one in which Zevran has to confront a deeper attachment to the protagonist.

Jon Curry provided Zevran's voice. Gaider recalled that the initial casting call produced performances that were considerably darker and more severe than he wanted, which he attributed partly to the character being described as an assassin. BioWare broadened its search and selected Curry, whose audition used an exaggerated delivery that is evocative of characters played by Spanish actor Antonio Banderas. Gaider encouraged Curry to emphasise Zevran's humour and flirtatiousness and later said that hearing Curry perform the role helped him establish the character's voice while completing Zevran's dialogue. Curry later recalled that he knew relatively little about the different outcomes available to Zevran while recording Origins. After recording a death scene, he assumed that Zevran's death was a fixed part of the story and only learned later that the character could survive depending on the player's choices.

Zevran was considered for a larger role in the Dragon Age comics written after Origins. In an annotation for Dragon Age Library Edition Volume 1, Gaider stated that Zevran was originally intended to take the place later occupied by Varric Tethras alongside Alistair and Isabela. Gaider considered Zevran a natural choice because the story travelled to Antiva, but ultimately decided that the resulting group dynamic did not work as well. A separate plan for Zevran to make a cameo appearance later in the story was also abandoned because of space constraints.

== Appearances ==
=== Dragon Age: Origins ===
Zevran is introduced as a member of the Antivan Crows, an organisation of professional assassins based in Antiva. He is contracted to kill the Grey Warden during the events surrounding the Fifth Blight, but survives the encounter and can subsequently become a companion. Through companion conversations, Zevran reveals details about his upbringing, training and experiences as an assassin. His personal storyline explores his relationship with the Antivan Crows and his changing loyalty towards the Grey Warden.

Zevran is one of four romance options available in Dragon Age: Origins. His romance route is available to protagonists of either sex, with his bisexuality represented through his dialogue and character history.

=== Dragon Age II ===
Zevran appears in Dragon Age II as a returning character. His appearance references his continued activities after the Fifth Blight and his association with the Antivan Crows.

=== Other ===
Official supplementary material identifies Zevran with House Arainai, one of the houses of the Antivan Crows. Zevran's entry in The World of Thedas Volume 2 is presented as an in-universe Antivan Crow report, which states that Guildmaster Talav brought Zevran into House Arainai in 9:12 Dragon, when he was about seven years old, after paying the remaining debt owed by the brothel in which Zevran had been raised. He was one of eighteen purchased recruits, or comprati, acquired by the house that year; only Zevran and fellow recruit Taliesen survived their training. Rinna later joined House Arainai, and the three were eventually trained as a unit whose complementary skills were used on assassination contracts. The same account places Zevran's early career against changes in House Arainai's standing within the Crows, as the house fell from First Talon and later sought to regain its position under Master Eoman Arainai.

The report describes Zevran's involvement in Rinna's death after she was accused of betraying the Crows and suggests that his reaction to her death contributed to his later willingness to undertake particularly dangerous contracts. It interprets his decision to seek the contract against the Grey Warden as potentially self-destructive rather than simply an attempt to advance within the organisation. The World of Thedas Volume 2 also discusses Zevran's later activities and his relationship with other characters, including his connection with Isabela during his time in Antiva.

== Reception and analysis ==
Zevran has been the subject of academic and critical discussion primarily concerning sexuality, romance systems and representation in role-playing games. Later criticism has placed him within the history of queer representation in mainstream role-playing games, while also examining limitations in the way his sexuality and characterisation are presented.

Writing retrospectively about Dragon Age: Origins, PC Gamer's Harvey Randall described the presence of two bisexual companions in a major 2009 role-playing game as unusually bold for its time, while characterising the game's treatment of queer themes as imperfect and sometimes contradictory. With respect to the relationship between Zevran's sexuality and his occupation as an assassin, Randall observed that traces of Gaider's original idea remain in Zevran's history of using seduction in his work as an assassin and in his difficulty treating his own feelings as something he can express openly. He nevertheless argued that the intelligence service inspiration behind the character was never developed into an explicit connection between Zevran's occupation and his queerness, describing this as a missed element of the finished characterisation.

Holmes examines Zevran as part of BioWare's changing approach to queer representation, arguing that Origins brought non-heteronormative relationships into the ordinary systems governing interaction with companions. He notes that companion approval is linked both to character interaction and to gameplay benefits: increasing Zevran's approval improves his combat attributes while also unlocking additional dialogue and the possibility of romance. Holmes argues that tying these systems together could expose players to queer intimacy even when romance was not their principal reason for interacting with a companion, and treats the visibility of bisexual relationships in Origins as significant in the context of Western computer role-playing games. Greer similarly analyses Dragon Age through the concept of queer "affordances", or the possibilities a game's systems provide for players to enact non-heterosexual identities and relationships. He argues that the series' relatively even treatment of heterosexual and same-sex relationships enables queer play, but also identifies a tension in treating sexual difference as effectively invisible: a design based on sameness may facilitate inclusion while limiting opportunities to represent sexuality as a distinct part of identity. Süngü likewise discusses Zevran as an example of interactive bisexual representation, in which the character's sexuality is encountered through dialogue and relationship choices rather than merely stated as background information.

Reynolds examines Zevran's flirtatious personality and sexual openness within fantasy conventions surrounding sexuality, arguing that the romance combines positive bisexual representation with characteristics associated with broader stereotypes. She nevertheless identifies a development in the romance storyline away from its initially sexual presentation towards trust and emotional commitment. Schallegger was more critical and argued that aspects of Zevran's portrayal reproduce stereotypes associated with representations of gay male characters in video games.

The reception of Zevran among LGBT players has also been examined empirically. In a qualitative study of six Czech LGBT players of the Dragon Age and Mass Effect series, Tereza Krobová, Ondřej Moravec and Jaroslav Švelch found that three participants criticised Zevran's portrayal. The participants associated the choice of a bisexual male elf with a broader fantasy convention in which elves are depicted as feminine or gentle, and some interpreted the character as a stereotypical or token form of queer representation. The authors cautioned that their small and geographically specific sample was not representative of LGBT players generally.

Zevran's characterisation has additionally been examined through the literary tradition of the rogue. David Matencio Durán compares his background with the protagonists of picaresque literature, identifying similarities in impoverished origins, social exclusion and the acquisition of skills such as seduction, deception and theft as means of survival. Matencio Durán also points to Zevran's status as an elf from an oppressed population and his later career as an assassin, arguing that contemporary video games retain the rogue as a socially marginal figure through whom narratives of oppression and non-conformity can be explored.
