= Heroes of Dragon Age =

2013 video game

- Loading screen of Heroes of Dragon Age, as of version 4.2
- Developer: EA Capital Games
- Publisher: Electronic Arts
- Series: Dragon Age
- Platforms: Android, iOS
- Release: December 5, 2013
- Genres: Tactical role-playing, Collectible card game

Heroes of Dragon Age was a freemium mobile tactical role-playing game developed by Capital Games and published by Electronic Arts. It is a spin-off title utilizing collectibles based on characters and lore from the Dragon Age fantasy series. The game received a soft launch in select countries during October 2013 for Android devices, and was released on December 5, 2013 for Android and iOS platforms.

== Premise ==
Unlike other spin-off media from the Dragon Age franchise, Heroes of Dragon Age does not contribute additional backstory or lore; instead, it explores what would happen if pivotal moments from various plot lines in the series have occurred differently. These alternative story elements serve as the backdrop for up to 16 quests available in the game's single-player format, which delve into extant game lore such as the Fifth Blight or during the fall of the ancient elven capital of Arlathan. Each quest is a self-contained map and lets players re-experience key moments from the main Dragon Age video games, novels, and codex entries.

Heroes of Dragon Age allows players to purchase and collect 3D figures of characters called "heroes" in the game, form them into a squad, and then battle either player or AI-controlled enemies. Robert Purchese from Eurogamer observed that the characters featured in Heroes were "pulled from all corners of the Dragon Age lore: good, evil, past, present - even the books are mined for inspiration", which include multiple fan favorites and notorious foes from the series. Collectible units range from common types like soldiers and bandits, through to unique characters like Alistair and Morrigan, each with their own traits for the players to consider. Post-launch support for Heroes has increased the number of collectible characters drawing from Dragon Age: Inquisition, which was released in November 2014, as well as other recent media.

== Gameplay ==
A squad of five characters, with the color of each figurine's base indicating the faction and rank of the individual unit

The game functions as a squad-based strategy game with the battles playing out automatically, and the outcome is contingent upon the selection of characters in a five-person party, their abilities and formation on the battlefield, as well as any runes that are buffing the team. Every character has a faction, shown by the colored tile they stand on, and if players who match these in appropriate rows and columns are rewarded with boosted statistics. Players can also tweak a characters statistics based on their placement in the player's squad: characters placed on the back row also gain a higher chance of dealing double damage, while those on the front get bonus health. The fifth character slot is to the side, and is reserved for large units such bears, giant spiders, or towering tree monsters known as Sylvan. When four characters of the same faction are used simultaneously, a faction bonus is granted which is calculated from each individual character's percentages added together. Players may keep multiple squads on hand which are optimized to take down specific types of opponents.

The player's characters are sorted into different classes and could level up by accumulating experience points earned in combat, similar to a traditional role-playing video game. Players may choose to combine identical characters in their collection into one amalgamation, which pools their experience points and raises their experience level cap in the process. Players may apply the "consume" mechanic on up to five redundant or unwanted characters of any kind and absorb them into a preferred favorite character, which in turn appropriates experience points from redundant characters in exchange for the probability of increasing the odds of delivering double-damage critical hits, as well as improving the statistics of another character.

In combat, the player's team line up on the left hand side while the opposing team line up on the right hand side. Once a battle has commenced, individual units from both teams will then exchange attacks, with their turns and actions dictated by their statistics and positions, until the entirety of one team is eliminated. Characters with a high initiative score move quickly and will be the first to strike, while slower characters will attack on a lower priority scale but deal more damage per hit. Players may use runes, which are single-use, time-limited power-ups to enhance their chances of success. Runes provide a range of benefits such as buffing the party's overall attack power, help players accumulate experience points or in-game currency faster, or direct individual units to focus their attacks on the opponent's quickest, weakest or most powerful fighters.

Players may also engage in player versus player battles, where players win and lose trophies depending on their rate of success.

== Development ==
EA announced Heroes of Dragon Age for mobile platforms in August 2013. Heroes producer Tim Lander disclosed in an interview with Eurogamer that he led a 30-person team at EA Capital Games, and together they spent about a year developing the game prior to launch. He described the game's freemium model as a "time versus money thing", noting that money only speeds up the time it would take for players to obtain any attractive rewards, and that players do not have pay anything provided they are willing to invest their time into the game. Executive Producer Jeferson Valadares said that the studio wanted to make an accessible strategy RPG which "takes full advantage of the Dragon Age universe's cool characters and locations.” Both Lander and Valadares insisted that nothing is locked behind a paywall in the game and that the entirety of the game's content is accessible just through playing. Valadares in particular explained that fairness is very important to the developers, and that "players that spend money can just increase their odds of getting rare characters".

The game does not provide any original story content or story-based tie-in to Inquisition, as EA Capital Games felt that content of that nature is best left to BioWare; instead, the focus for the developers is on gameplay. Lander did not rule out adding any original story content for the game at a future date, noting that the developers would need to work closely with BioWare on that aspect and that any content of that nature would need to "make sense", and claimed that EA Capital Games employ community managers who actively engage with the player community and canvass for their opinions on solutions to improve their gameplay experience. Lander explained that the developers were committed continue to support Heroes by adding new characters, new features and support over a period of several years, and he was confident that Heroes is a standalone title that he believe players could play for years.

== Reception ==
Reception

Aggregate score
Aggregator	Score
Metacritic	59/100

Review scores
Publication	Score
Eurogamer	5/10
MacLife	7/10
Digital Spy	6/10

Heroes of Dragon Age has received a mixed response from critics, holding a 59/100 rating on Metacritic based on 9 reviews. Dan Whitehead from Eurogamer explained that while the game's various mechanics suggests that Heroes is about depth and strategy, he observed that it is "only true up to a point", noting that it is difficult to stay engaged when players have no real input in determining battlefield tactics, and have to leave it to chance. Whitehead felt that "it would only take a few more turns of the micro-transaction screw for it to be intolerable", and that a "more astute understanding of what players want and need (often two different things) can make for a more satisfying, yet no less commercial, free-to-play experience". Nevertheless, he observed that the "somewhat awkward middle ground" as exemplified by games like Heroes represented "huge progress for EA's freemium ambitions", drawing a comparison to its contemporary, the much-maligned Dungeon Keeper Mobile game and said that Heroes "doesn't get it as gruesomely wrong". He opined that had the developers put "a little more faith in the player's ability to cope with deeper strategy", Heroes would have turned out to be "a genuinely good game".

Scott Nichols from Digital Spy drew attention to the game's focus which was "squarely on collecting character figurines", and concluded that Heroes of Dragon Age will only really appeal to dedicated fans of the series. He observed that "collecting and leveling up your figurines can become quite addicting", but advised that series fans "should set their expectations accordingly before playing, because there is still a long wait until the next proper game in the series". Leif Johnson from MacLife said Heroes is a "generally entertaining romp through Thedan lore", with its Campaigns full of extra information about the world's lore. He praised the visuals and music for providing an authentic ambience, fast-paced battles where the game's "consume-and-combine mechanic" adds a depth of strategy. He criticized the lack of battle interaction and an overly limiting stamina bar.

Kenn Leandre from IGN gave a positive review with a scored of 7.8 out of 10. He said the game "hits all the right notes in not only getting players hooked-up on playing it over and over again", but also succeeds in "presenting impressive depths in terms of strategy, style of play and character designs". Leandre praised Heroes for its quality visuals, engaging battle mechanics, the generous variety of characters available for players at the start of the game, and its booster pack mechanics; conversely, he noted the game's repetitive battles and lack of trading option as among its most prominent weaknesses.
