= Loghain =

Loghain Mac Tir
- Dragon Age character
- Concept Art of Loghain Mac Tir.
- First appearance: Dragon Age: The Stolen Throne (2009)
- First game: Dragon Age: Origins (2009)
- Voiced by: Simon Templeman

In-universe information
- Home: Ferelden
- Class: Warrior
- Specialization: Champion

Loghain Mac Tir is a character from BioWare's Dragon Age media franchise. He hails from the kingdom of Ferelden, a realm in the world of Thedas, where the Dragon Age series is set. Loghain first appears in the 2009 novel The Stolen Throne as one of its main characters alongside his friend, King Maric Theirin. The novel's story is set during their youth, where Loghain served as Maric's right hand during Ferelden's war against the Orlesian Empire. He would next appear in The Calling, eleven years after King Maric and his companions ventured into the Deep Roads as described in The Stolen Throne, and eight years after the rebellion led by Prince Maric managed to liberate Ferelden from the Orlesians.

He made his video game debut in Dragon Age: Origins, which was released shortly after the release of The Calling, as one of the video game's main antagonists. Depending on the player's choices in Origins, Loghain may appear in a cameo role in the expansion for Origins, Dragon Age: Origins – Awakening, as well as a supporting role in Dragon Age: Inquisition. He is voiced by Simon Templeman for all media.

Critics have praised Loghain as a morally complex villain whose motives remain understandable despite the severity of his actions.

== Character overview ==
Loghain is depicted as a war hero and a patriot, revered by many common folk in Ferelden. He inspires intense loyalty among those who serve under him. If the player recruits Loghain as a party member and spends time interacting with him, he would articulate his reasons for doubting the veracity of the Blight and reveal his suspicion of the Grey Warden's presence as being merely part of a scheme from Ferelden's former colonizers, the Orlesian Empire. He possesses a "strong sense of honour", albeit with a "ruthless" streak. After King Maric vanished during a sea journey and is presumed dead, Loghain became responsible for defending Ferelden and guiding Maric's naive son and successor to the throne, Cailan Theirin. His daughter, Anora would eventually be married to Cailan.

== Creation and development ==
Loghain was the first character to be created during the development cycle for Origins. In an interview with PC Gamer, Origins lead writer Gaider describes Loghain's characterization as part of the general shift toward a more morally ambiguous form of RPG. He explained that “a lot of Dragon Age was us at BioWare reacting to things we did or didn't like about Dungeons & Dragons as a game system or a setting, so I'd say the effort to move to something more morally grey was intentional. Good people are capable of terribly evil things, and terrible people are capable of great good”. Loghain's relatable motives are an intentional design choice, allowing for the possibility that a player might be able to see from his perspective and judge him as simply being misguided. Gaider considers Loghain to be his favorite villain in the Dragon Age series because he sympathized with the character's position, noting that villains who perceive themselves as the good guy are the ones that intrigue him the most. He described Loghain as a tragic figure, and he considers the decision to potentially kill him especially poignant when there is a viable option to redeem the character.

== Appearances ==
=== In video games ===
Loghain is first encountered at the fortress of Ostagar in Origins, as a general who provides strategies for King Cailan Theirin in the defense of Ferelden from the invading Darkspawn, a race of humanoid tainted creatures that mostly dwell in the underground of Thedas. As the Teyrn commanding the army, Loghain is responsible for devising the tactics that will be used in the Battle of Ostagar. Loghain's plan utilizes the hammer and anvil tactic; the Grey Wardens are to act as the anvil, drawing the main Darkspawn horde out, upon which Loghain's troops would rush forward and surround them from behind. The signal for Loghain's attack would be given by a beacon atop the dilapidated Tower of Ishal, which would be lit when the Darkspawn are fully committed in their attack on the Wardens.

Although Loghain advises him not to fight on the front lines, Cailan refuses to listen and insists on accompanying the Wardens. Cailan also insists on having the two newest Grey Wardens, the player character and Alistair, light the beacon. Although this was done, Loghain orders his army to leave the field instead, leaving both the King and the Grey Wardens to die. For the majority of the game from then on, Loghain takes up residence in Denerim and appoints himself regent to Queen Anora, becoming the de facto ruler of Ferelden. He uses the Grey Wardens as a scapegoat, blaming defeat at Ostagar on the Wardens; he simultaneously outlaws the Grey Wardens in Ferelden, putting a price on the head of any survivors and closing the border to Warden reinforcements from Orlais. He also demands that Ferelden's nobility submit to his rule. The nobility, either disbelieving Loghain's explanation of the disaster at Ostagar or feeling that, given his common birth and the alacrity with which he had taken the regency in the aftermath of Cailan's death, Loghain was opportunistically grabbing a throne he had no claim to, refused to acknowledge Loghain's authority and demanded that he resign the regency. Loghain refuses to do so and his heavy-handed tactics to force the people to fall into line instigates a civil war between his forces and those of Ferelden's nobility.

Loghain may join the player's party as a secret companion character late in the game. After the player and Loghain duel each other during the Landsmeet event, the player may choose to either have Loghain executed for his crimes or recruited into the Grey Wardens. Allowing Loghain to live will result in Alistair leaving the party in disgust, and will allow Loghain to take his place in the party. Choosing to have Loghain killed will result in Alistair staying, but Anora will refuse to marry whoever killed her father. It is possible if the player has hardened Alistair through his personal quest to have Alistair still marry Anora and rule as king while keeping Loghain alive, in this path Loghain still replaces him as a party member. Loghain is aware the Joining was meant to be a death sentence, and is willing to sacrifice himself to kill the Archdemon, seeing it as a way of making amends for his mistakes. At the conclusion of this story path, the player may sacrifice either their protagonist or Loghain to slay the Archdemon, or in the alternative the Grey Warden characters may survive the death of the Archdemon if one of them participates in Morrigan's ritual.

Loghain makes a small cameo appearance in Dragon Age: Origins – Awakening should he survive the events of Origins, he informs the player character he is being sent by the Grey Wardens to serve in Orlais by order of the senior Grey Warden leadership; if the player married Anora, he will make a number of related comments, including suggesting plans for an heir and admonishing the player to treat his daughter well.

In Dragon Age II, Loghain's actions at the Battle of Ostagar were mentioned briefly by the story's narrator, Varric Tethras.

Loghain may make a further appearance as a supporting character in Dragon Age: Inquisition, should he survive the events of Origins and joins the Grey Wardens. He is presented as an ally of the Inquisition alongside Hawke, the protagonist of Dragon Age II, while they attempt to investigate corruption within the ranks of the Grey Warden Order. If Loghain participates in the ritual with Morrigan in Origins, she will conceive a child with him; Loghain may encounter his young son in Inquisition.

=== Other appearances ===
Loghain's origin story is told in Dragon Age: The Stolen Throne, which takes place more than thirty years before the events of the Origins. During the Orlesian occupation, Loghain's father refused to pay the tax collectors a tribute tax levied on all of Ferelden landholders by the Orlesian emperor, and was accused of tax evasion. One day the Orlesian soldiers seized the farmhold, and Loghain and his father were forced to watch as Orlesian troops raped and killed his mother. After murdering the Orlesian commander responsible, Loghain's father took him and fled into the Fereldan wilds, banding together with other desperate Ferelden's to eke out a living however they could. While living with a band of outlaws, Loghain met Maric, though he was not initially aware of Maric's lineage. When the Orlesian forces caught up with them, his father sacrificed himself to save Maric after charging Loghain with his safety. They pass through the Korcari Wilds, and meets the mysterious Witch of the Wilds, who enables them to pass through the Wilds safely. She provides this help on the condition that Maric makes her a promise; the specifics of this promise are unknown. She also prophesied to Maric that a Blight will one day come to Ferelden and gives him a cryptic warning about Loghain: "Keep him close and he will betray you, each time worse than the last". The duo successfully escape the wilds and joins Maric's rebel army. Over the course of the rebellion, Loghain became one of Maric's closest friends, as well as a key military advisor of the rebel cause. His strategies and tactics were responsible for many of the rebels' greatest victories. Afterwards Loghain led the Ferelden forces at the critical Battle of River Dane and was rewarded for his leadership by being made Teyrn of Gwaren. The Ferelden resistance eventually drove the Orlesian Empire out of their homeland completely.

In the sequel to The Stolen Throne, Dragon Age: The Calling, Loghain continued to support King Maric in the years after the passing of Queen Rowan, the sister of Eamon and Teagan Guerrin and mother to Cailan Theirin. It is revealed that Loghain had long been suspicious of the Grey Wardens; the Order was previously exiled from the realm centuries before due to a power struggle for the Ferelden throne, and he perceives the organization to be in league with Orlais. After Maric vanished following a meeting with the Wardens and the First Enchanter of the Orlesian Circle of Magi, Loghain deployed the Ferelden army to search for Maric while he spied on the Orlesians, certain that they would be betrayed. Two days after a tower named Kinhold Hold was taken over by Orlesian mages and templars who allied with a Darkspawn leader, Loghain led an assault on Kinloch Hold through Lake Calenhad. The attack was successful and Loghain was surprised when he found Maric in the tower as well. Loghain believed the plot was the doing of the Grey Wardens and felt Maric made a mistake in continuing to trust them. He disapproved when Maric indicated that he has allowed the Wardens to return to Ferelden, as they were previously exiled from Ferelden for hundreds of years by a previous King of Ferelden, and re-establish their order there on a permanent basis. Loghain did not speak to Maric the entire trip back to Denerim until they parted ways. At that point, Loghain only said, “There will be no Blight, Maric”.

In 2010, Loghain was included in DC Unlimited's range of Dragon Age themed video game figures, along with Duncan, Morrigan, and a Genlock.

== Reception ==
Critics praised Loghain's characterization in Origins, particularly his moral ambiguity and the player's ability to determine whether he is executed or given an opportunity for redemption. In its December 2010 issue, Game Informer ranked him ninth on its list of the "Top 30 Characters Who Defined a Decade". The magazine's Jeff Cork described him as more than a one-dimensional traitor, arguing that his actions were motivated by loyalty to Ferelden rather than a desire for personal power. Matt Bertz later named Loghain the best character in Origins, praising BioWare for portraying a protector who continued to believe he was acting correctly even as his decisions led him into increasingly severe wrongdoing.

IGN included Loghain's withdrawal at Ostagar on its list of memorable video game moments. Christian Holt considered the event an effective beginning to the story because it left unresolved whether Loghain had abandoned a hopeless battle or betrayed Ferelden's king, before allowing the player to judge him later in the game. Rick Lane of PC Gamer similarly identified Loghain as a notable example of a human antagonist, observing that his harmful actions were driven by recognizable emotions including fear, patriotic conviction and love for his daughter. JP Gemborys of Game Informer categorized him as a sympathetic antagonist who made an arguably defensible strategic decision at Ostagar but subsequently seized power and committed further atrocities to retain it. Gemborys also highlighted Loghain's capacity for repentance if recruited into the Grey Wardens.

Lane praised Dragon Age for allowing the player to make a final judgment about Loghain rather than merely defeating him. Richard Cobbett of Eurogamer cited Loghain's complexity as evidence of the care given to the game's writing, and later described him in Rock Paper Shotgun as an especially successful sympathetic antagonist. Cobbett argued that recruiting Loghain reveals a more rounded character who recognizes his mistakes and volunteers to sacrifice himself to stop the Blight. Guest contributor Jonathan Wilson of GameCritics likewise described Loghain as logical but deluded and paranoid rather than simply evil. Although Wilson considered the Landsmeet one of the game's strongest choices, he criticized its resolution as contrived because the player may only execute Loghain or conscript him into the Grey Wardens, without alternatives such as imprisonment.

Sam Roberts of GamesRadar considered Loghain the only substantial antagonist in Origins, praising the dialogue through which the player can uncover his reasons for opposing the Grey Wardens. Keri Honea of PlayStation Lifestyle argued that the tie-in novels The Stolen Throne and The Calling were important to understanding his hostility toward Orlais and the Wardens, and said that reading them caused her to view him more sympathetically. Wendy Browne of Women Write About Comics similarly found that the novels provided greater insight into Loghain's loyalty to Maric and his past as a Fereldan hero, while not fully resolving why he later turned against Maric's heir. Josh Straub of Game Informer argued that Loghain's actions at Ostagar shaped both the central moral conflict of Origins and the broader direction of the Dragon Age franchise, including the events leading into Dragon Age II.
