= Stray Gods: The Roleplaying Musical =

2023 video game

- Developer: Summerfall Studios
- Publisher: Humble Games
- Writer: David Gaider
- Composers: Austin Wintory; Montaigne; Tripod
- Engine: Unreal Engine
- Platforms: Nintendo Switch; PlayStation 4; PlayStation 5; Windows; Xbox One; Xbox Series X/S
- Release: 10 August 2023
- Genres: Role-playing, adventure
- Mode: Single-player

Stray Gods: The Roleplaying Musical is a role-playing adventure video game developed by Summerfall Studios and published by Humble Games. The game was released on 10 August 2023, for Nintendo Switch, PlayStation 4, PlayStation 5, Windows, Xbox One and Xbox Series X/S.

== Synopsis ==
In Stray Gods, players assume the role of Grace, a college dropout who finds herself accused of murdering the last muse. Grace must prove her innocence to a pantheon of Greek gods, consisting of Athena, Apollo, Persephone, and Aphrodite, all within seven days. She must learn to wield her newly developed powers of music to find out the truth behind Calliope’s death. Players select dialogue choices, which change the lyrics, musical style, and even outcome of the songs.

== Cast and characters ==
- Laura Bailey as Grace, a young singer who inherits the power of the last muse, Calliope.
- Janina Gavankar as Freddie, Grace's best friend.
- Ashley Johnson as Calliope.
- Erika Ishii as Hermes.
- Felicia Day as Athena, Goddess of Wisdom and leader of the Chorus.
- Troy Baker as Apollo, God of Prophecy and member of the Chorus.
- Mary Elizabeth McGlynn as Persephone, former Queen of the Underworld and member of the Chorus.
- Merle Dandridge as Aphrodite, Goddess of Love and member of the Chorus.
- Khary Payton as Pan.
- Kimberly Brooks as the Oracle.
- Abubakar Salim as Eros.
- Lauren "Lolo" Spencer as Venus.
- Allegra Clark as Hecate.
- Rahul Kohli as Asterion, the Minotaur.
- Anjali Bhimani as Medusa.
- Anthony Rapp as Orpheus.

== Development and release ==
Stray Gods is developed by Melbourne, Australia-based developer Summerfall Studios. It is written by founder David Gaider, formerly of BioWare, and scored by Austin Wintory, composer of Journey. The songs were co-written by Wintory with singer Montaigne and the Australian musical trio Tripod. Stray Gods uses 2D hand-illustrated visuals, featuring comic book-style aesthetics with stylized character design.

Originally named Chorus: An Adventure Musical, the game had successfully crowdfunded on Fig.co in 2019, after it was announced at PAX AUS in an opening keynote by David Gaider. The name change was announced on March 18, 2022, as well as Summerfall Studios’ partnership with Humble Games for Stray Gods.

Chiefly inspired by Buffy the Vampire Slayer's musical episode "Once More, With Feeling", the developers of Stray Gods wanted to make a video game that combines hallmarks of musical theatre with interactive storytelling.

The game includes branching narrative paths, where player choice will not only determine the story and tone of the dialogue spoken, but also the melodies, lyrics, and styles of music that Grace sings. According to Austin Wintory, the "combinatorial potential of the songs" in Stray Gods is so large that it is virtually impossible for anyone to have the same playthrough twice. In June 2023, Summerfall and Humble announced that the game will also be available on all major home consoles alongside its Steam release in August.

On April 12, 2023, Summerfall Studios and Humble Games unveiled the cast of Stray Gods in a live event at the El Rey Theatre in Los Angeles. Titled Myth & Music, the one-hour event was hosted by Troy Baker and livestreamed on Critical Role's Twitch channel. With live performances by Laura Bailey, Mary Elizabeth McGlynn, and Ashley Johnson, Myth & Music also included various Q&As which revealed the casting of Felicia Day, Rahul Kohli, Anjali Bhimani, and Janina Gavankar. The full cast list was revealed at the event.

On June 27, 2024, Summerfall Studios released a DLC called Stray Gods: Orpheus. It features six additional songs by the original songwriters, as well as one co-written with Tom Cardy.

== Reception ==
Reception

Aggregate score
Aggregator	Score
Metacritic	(NS) 70/100 (PC) 76/100 (PS5) 78/100 (XSXS) 70/100

Review scores
Publication	Score
Destructoid	7.5/10
Eurogamer	3/5
Game Informer	8.25/10
GameSpot	9/10
GamesRadar+	4/5
Hardcore Gamer	4/5
IGN	7/10
PC Gamer (US)	81/100
RPGamer	4/5
RPGFan	92/100
Shacknews	8/10
The Guardian	3/5
VideoGamer.com	7/10

Stray Gods: The Roleplaying Musical received "generally favorable" reviews for the Windows and PlayStation 5 versions while the Nintendo Switch and Xbox Series X/S versions received "mixed or average" reviews from critics, according to review aggregator website Metacritic.

=== Accolades ===
It was an Honorable Mention for "Excellence in Audio" and "Excellence in Narrative" at the 2024 Independent Games Festival Awards, and was an Honorable Mention for "Best Debut" at the 24th Game Developers Choice Awards. The game was also nominated for "Game, Original Adventure", "Original Light Mix Score, New IP", "Performance in a Comedy, Supporting" with Janina Gavankar as Freddie, Mary Elizabeth McGlynn as Persephone, and Felicia Day as Athena, and "Song, Original or Adapted" with "Adrift", and won "Performance in a Comedy, Lead" with Laura Bailey as Grace, and "Writing in a Comedy" at the NAVGTR Awards. It also won the award for "Best Music for an Indie Game", "Best New Original IP Audio", and "Best Original Song" at the 22nd Annual Game Audio Network Guild (G.A.N.G) Awards, whereas its other nominations were for "Best Ensemble Cast Performance" and "Creative and Technical Achievement in Music".

Year	Award	Category	Result	Ref(s).
2023	Australian Game Developer Awards	Game Of The Year	Won	
2023	Golden Joystick Awards	Best Audio	Nominated	
2024	Grammy Awards	Best Score Soundtrack for Video Games and Other Interactive Media	Nominated	
2024	GLAAD Media Awards	Outstanding Video Game	Nominated	
2024	British Academy Games Awards	Debut Game	Nominated	
2024	Games for Change Awards	Best in Innovation	Won	
