= Dragon Age: The Stolen Throne =

2009 novel by David Gaider

- Cover of Dragon Age: The Stolen Throne
- Author: Various
- Language: English
- Series: Dragon Age
- Genre: Fantasy
- Publisher: Tor Books; Dark Horse Books (deluxe edition)
- Publication date: March 3, 2009; September 17, 2019 (deluxe edition)
- Publication place: Canada/United States
- Media type: Print (Paperback); Print (Hardcover) (deluxe edition)
- Pages: 400
- ISBN: 978-0-7653-2408-5
- OCLC: 277196552
- Dewey Decimal: 813/.6 22
- LC Class: PR9199.4.G337 D73 2009
- Followed by: Dragon Age: The Calling

Dragon Age: The Stolen Throne is a fantasy novel written by David Gaider, released in March 2009. It is Gaider's first novel, as well as the first novel set in Thedas, the setting of BioWare's Dragon Age role-playing video game franchise. The Stolen Throne serves as a prequel to the BioWare role-playing game Dragon Age: Origins. Set thirty years before the events of Origins, this novel tells the backstory of characters important to the game, such as Loghain Mac Tir, as well as how the kingdom of Ferelden, the setting of Origins, achieved independence from the neighboring nation of Orlais.

The Stolen Throne was first published on March 3, 2009 by Tor Books. A deluxe hardcover edition was released by Dark Horse Books on September 12, 2018, featuring new illustrations by Stefano Martino, Andres Ponce, German Ponce and Alvaro Sarraseca.

== Development ==
David Gaider was the lead writer of the Dragon Age series during his tenure at BioWare. Gaider commented that while he did discuss with BioWare management about the possibility of doing a novel earlier in the development cycle for Origins, the fact that both the Dragon Age and Mass Effect series have book-based prequels was "completely incidental". He said in an interview with Gamasutra that publishing company Tor Books first approached BioWare about a tie-in novelization for the then-upcoming Dragon Age: Origins, due to the positive reception of Mass Effect: Revelation by Drew Karpyshyn. BioWare offered the opportunity as author of the project to Gaider, who accepted as he was responsible for the majority of the writing work which fleshed out the lore and history of the Dragon Age setting. In Gaider's own words, the benefit of having someone like him writing the book was that he would know exactly what a Dragon Age story is supposed to sound like, and that the Dragon Age series was his "baby".

Gaider said that the protagonist of a novel is always pre-determined and non-interactive unlike that of a video game; as the novel's author, Gaider had access to information that players will not read in the game, which he could use to articulate the character's motivations or inner thoughts if it serves the story, and he had the freedom to change the point of view between characters during the course of the narrative. He noted that unlike his work in video games, he could put down on paper for the novel anything from his own imagination without facing the physical limitations of technology and what he could actually show. He found the overall experience to be "novel" and "unique" given his usual occupation as a game designer and writer, and not as hard of an experience he anticipated it to be. On the other hand, Gaider commented that players have agency when playing a video game character, and would tend to identify more strongly with their characters since they get to direct the action.

For the novel's theme, Gaider decided to explore some of the possible stories he seeded in parts of Thedas when he first made the setting; he did not know at first whether they would ultimately be utilized for Origins. Eventually he decided that the novel would be about the history of Ferelden's struggle for independence against the Orlesian Empire, an event referred to many times in the game, with Gaider noting that he and the rest of the development team initially tried to incorporate that story into the narrative for Origins. He recognized that the continuity between the games' narrative and the tie-in material was not "necessarily going to mix that well", noting that it is problematic to incorporate a character originally introduced in the novelizations into the games, as the character ought to be presented in a manner which does not confuse players who do not have knowledge of the tie-in material, while at the same time satisfying players who did read the novels and not giving the impression of "a rehash of what they already know".

== Plot ==
The novel opens with the country of Ferelden occupied by the neighbouring Orlesian Empire. Queen Moira, who sought to expel the Orlesians, has been murdered by traitor nobles, but her son Maric has escaped. While attempting to flee the assassins who killed his mother, Maric encounters Loghain, who is part of a band of Fereldan outlaws. Having no real alternatives, Maric joins up with them. However Maric is not able to stay at the outlaw camp long, as an Orlesian army looking for Maric attacks. Yet, Loghain is able to lead Maric to safety by taking him to the Korcari Wilds, a region avoided by most due to its danger. Here they meet the mysterious Witch of the Wilds, who enables them to pass through the Wilds safely. She provides this help on the condition that Maric makes her a promise. The specifics of this promise are unknown. She also tells Maric that a Blight will one day come to Ferelden and gives him a cryptic warning about Loghain's loyalty.

After escaping the Wilds, Maric and Loghain are led to the remaining rebel army by Maric's betrothed, Rowan Guerrin, just in time to defeat an Orlesian army about to attack them using Loghain's aptitude for strategy. The next few years see Maric, Loghain and Rowan become close friends as they strengthen the rebel army until it is in a position to take Gwaren, a Fereldan town. Katriel, an elf woman who claims to be a messenger, warns them of an impending attack on Gwaren and they are able to repel it. After this, Katriel and Maric begin a relationship. However, Katriel is a spy for Meghren, the Orlesian King of Ferelden. She provides Maric with false information that convinces him to attack the town of West Hill. This attack results in massive loss of life for the rebel army, and Maric, Loghain and Rowan being separated from the remainder of the army.

Regretting her deception and developing real feelings for Maric, Katriel leads Maric, Loghain and Rowan to the Deep Roads, a series of tunnels, in order to return to Gwaren. After facing the dangers of the Deep Roads, including giant spiders and darkspawn, and escaping in the company of a dwarven warband, whom Maric convinces to join the rebellion, the group reach the surface. Once they return to Gwaren, they find the remnants of the rebel army and once again secure the town against an Orlesian army sent to wipe out the last remnants of the rebellion. Maric's miraculous return inspires nationwide revolution by the Fereldan people against Orlesian rule, and Meghren's heavy-handed efforts to restore order only cause further insurrection and his reluctant allies amongst the Fereldan nobility to side with Maric.

By this time, Loghain and Rowan have formed a romantic bond (in part due to Maric abandoning Rowan for Katriel), but Loghain has also discovered Katriel's betrayal and reveals it to Maric, omitting that Katriel had reneged on her orders out of love for Maric. After discovering her actions, Maric kills Katriel in blind rage, only to discover later that Katriel had been loyal out of love for him; Loghain wished to impress on Maric the importance of a king doing what has to be done, as opposed to what he wants to do. Following her death, Loghain encourages Rowan to become Maric's wife and queen, for Maric and Ferelden's benefit. She agrees (though the relationship between Maric and Loghain becomes much colder as a result of this and Katriel's death) and with increased momentum and growing outrage at the continuing cruelty of the Orlesians, there is now widespread support for Maric and the rebel cause. Victory is all but assured for the rebels. Maric also exacts justice on the traitor nobles who murdered his mother, luring them to a meeting under the pretense of a truce, then killing them for their crimes, before Loghain and Rowan break the back of Meghren's armies at the Battle of River Dane, ensuring Meghren's downfall and the eventual defeat of the occupation.

The novel closes with Mother Ailis, a Chantry priestess who once lived within the outlaw camp, telling Maric and Rowan's son Cailan stories of his father; after the victory at River Dane, Orlais abandoned its occupation of Ferelden as a lost cause, and after three more years of war, Denerim fell to the rebels after a long siege, Meghren was overthrown and executed for his crimes and Maric is crowned as king. Ailis tells that Maric has become a popular king, Loghain has become a powerful lord and has married and had a daughter, and that Rowan has died after a long illness. After relating this, Ailis hobbles after Cailan, who has run off into the distance.

== Reception ==
Matt Litten, writing for VGBlogger.com, commented on The Stolen Throne's dark and mature tone, noting that "Gaider doesn't hold much back in describing the harrowing nature of battle" and that the novel's overall depiction of violence is "much more intense than most fantasy novels". He concluded that the novel "serves its purpose beautifully" as a tie-in prequel, and that its story is "very well written, and the strong character relationships that develop will surely tug on your emotions". RPGWatch concluded that reading The Stolen Throne will enhance the immersive experience of Origins for players, though the novel is found to be uneven quality with flaws like "occasionally clumsy writing", "plot points given away in advance", as well as overuse of typical fantasy and romance clichés. Nevertheless, Gaider's enthusiasm for the novel's setting was complimented, and that the kingdom of Ferelden "springs to life in all of its endearingly clichéd splendor" from his earnest articulation.

Nick Gazin from Vice praised The Stolen Throne as a great read. Clive Webster from Bit-Tech was enthused about The Stolen Throne and said that it "does read like a typical fantasy book and not merely a narration of a video game". Gamesradar recommended that readers who intend to explore the Dragon Age novel series should start from The Stolen Throne.

== Sequel ==
A sequel to The Stone Throne, Dragon Age: The Calling, was released on October 13, 2009. Also written by David Gaider, the novel is centered on the relationship between King Maric Theirin and the Grey Wardens; Maric allowed the latter to return to Ferelden after they were exiled by his predecessor two hundred years ago. One of the Wardens apparently defects and aligns himself with the darkspawn, and the Wardens seek help from Maric and Loghain to find him. A deluxe edition of The Calling was also released by Dark Horse Books on December 12, 2018.
