= Flemeth =

Fictional character from Dragon Age

- Dragon Age character
- Flemeth presented in both her humanoid and dragon form, as illustrated on the cover art of the August 2010 issue of Game Informer
- First appearance: Dragon Age: The Stolen Throne (2009)
- First game: Dragon Age: Origins (2009)
- Created by: David Gaider
- Voiced by: Kate Mulgrew

In-universe information
- Aliases: The Witch of the Wilds; Asha'bellanar
- Home: Korcari Wilds, Ferelden

Flemeth is a character in BioWare's Dragon Age franchise. She first appears in the 2009 novel The Stolen Throne as the Witch of the Wilds, a notorious sorceress who resides in the Korcari Wilds region within the Kingdom of Ferelden in the world of Thedas and provides conditional aid to the novel's main characters when they pass through her territory. Her first video game appearance is Dragon Age: Origins alongside her daughter Morrigan, which is set several decades after the events of The Stolen Throne, and again aids the story's protagonists.

Flemeth has few overall appearances in series media, though she plays an important role in its overarching narrative through her inscrutable willingness to provide aid to the various protagonists of the Dragon Age series at pivotal story moments. In Dragon Age II, she saves the Hawke family and guides them to Kirkwall, which sets the events of the game in motion. She also provides insight on how to defeat the main antagonist of Dragon Age: Inquisition. Flemeth is voiced by American actress Kate Mulgrew for all relevant media.

The character has received an overall positive reception and has been cited as a notable example of a complex and interesting older female character in video games. Praise for the character focused on her cryptic nature and morally ambiguous personality, as well as her voice acting by Mulgrew.

== Character overview ==
In the Dragon Age universe, Flemeth is the eponymous subject of many legends and superstitions which explain how she became the Witch of the Wilds, a sobriquet given to her by the locals of a region known as the Korcari Wilds. A few versions recount the tale of her husband or lover being murdered by a jealous rival; in her grief and rage she became possessed by a vengeful spirit and committed mass murder before fleeing into the Korcari Wilds, where she has remained ever since. Within the series, Flemeth alternates between maternal, antagonistic, and ambiguous personas in each of her appearances. She is said to offer aid to petitioners and supplicants who seek her, but rarely in the way one expects. The Chasind barbarians call Flemeth "The Mother of Vengeance", a capricious being that only the truly desperate would consider turning towards for help, and often paint her in the motif of a great dragon or serpent; she in fact possesses the ability to transform into a large and extremely powerful dragon.

Flemeth is noted for her longevity or even immortality; to the Dalish elves, she is known as "Asha'bellanar", or the woman of many years. She is said to have many daughters, all of whom are witches like their mother; two notable ones are Morrigan, who lives with her in the Korcari Wilds until the events of Origins, and Yavana who appears in the comic series Dragon Age: The Silent Grove and lives in Antiva's Teleri Swamps. Flemeth has a strained relationship with Morrigan, who is unsure if the witch is actually her birth mother. A subplot which revolve around Morrigan's complicated relationship with her mother in Origins involves her potential discovery of Flemeth's grimoire, which reveals her method of extending her unnaturally long lifespan by possessing her daughters' bodies.

== Concept and design ==
Flemeth was created and written by David Gaider. He intentionally wrote Flemeth as an aloof and whimsical character who talks in circles, and rarely provides the individual who converses with her a straight answer. Gaider originally intended for the game's origin story to have a historical framing which is narrated as a story by an old woman; the player would initially think it is Flemeth, only for her to be revealed as an elderly Morrigan by the end of the story. Gaider considers the resolution of the Morrigan and Flemeth plot in Dragon Age: Inquisition to be the most complex video game scene he has ever written, as it had "three overlapping variants and juggled a lot of different needs".

Flemeth's visual design received a complete overhaul from Dragon Age II onwards. Character artist Francis Lacuna remarked that her redesign "seemed a gamble at first, going from a crazy old lady living in a shoe to a crazy old lady who can turn into a dragon, eat Darkspawn for breakfast and is also kind of a hot babe...which is disturbing and awful and at the same time – awesome!".

=== Portrayal ===
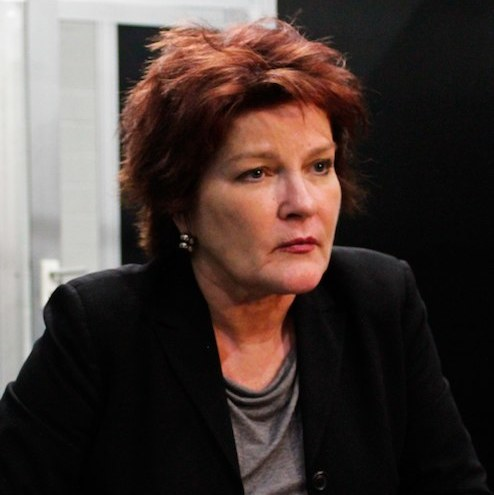
Kate Mulgrew, the voice actress of Flemeth

Kate Mulgrew spoke positively of her experience working with BioWare as Flemeth's voice actress on a number of occasions. For Mulgrew, acting without cameras, makeup or costumes and with only a script and a sound engineer to assist her was a liberating experience. She liked the range she was allowed to have with Flemeth, "from her very darkest tones to moments of almost girlishness", or "going from fury to confidence, and confidence to reflection". She described the vocal dexterity required to capture the darkness of the character to be "challenging and very freeing...almost joyful to go that deep". Mulgrew herself is not a gamer, though she indicates that this is to her benefit as it allows her to be completely detached to the character she plays. Mulgrew opined that to portray Flemeth, she cannot "really have any kind of stake in this game at all, except the stake of her reality."

Mulgrew considers Origins to be very well written, "epic, dark, and brutal" in tone, and that "there's an intelligence and a depth" that she does not see very often in other video games. She described Flemeth as a mysterious witch who is a richly textured and transcendent character, noting that the player has to "stay with the game and stay with the character to discover just how mysterious she is". She also said Flemeth is a personality who is full of rage, which emanated from what happened to her "when she was a young and very beautiful woman, and had to pay the price for a love that she once had". Mulgrew alluded to undercurrents and secrets surrounding the character which drew from her past experiences of loss and despair, though she remarked that "it is not all dark" as in time "her history reveals itself as she reveals herself". When asked to compare Flemeth to other characters she has played in a 2009 interview, Mulgrew replied that they do not have her depth, or magnitude, or discipline; to her, Flemeth is not a mere witch but "a very advanced kind of character" with a profound personal history, which she brings to bear on the choices she makes and the intriguing things she say. Having possessed context and insight into the character's motivations and true nature, Mulgrew felt she could "grasp her fury and her power in a different way", and noted that "there's a sense of great adult play". In a 2014 interview, Mulgrew further elaborates on the character's morally ambiguous nature.

== Appearances ==
Flemeth's first appears in The Stolen Throne as the mysterious Witch of the Wilds, who allows Maric and Loghain safe passage through the Korcari Wilds. She provides this help on the condition that Maric makes her an unspecified promise. She prophesied to Maric that a Blight will one day come to Ferelden and that Loghain will betray him if he keeps him close, "each time worse than the last".

Flemeth appears in a short prequel web comic for Dragon Age: Origins by the artists of Penny Arcade, released on September 4, 2009. It tells the tale of a band of templars who were tasked with hunting down the Witch of the Wilds.

In Origins, she is first encountered by the latest Grey Wardens recruits of Ferelden, where she hands over a set of ancient treaties and provides advice for their future. She later rescues the player character and Alistair from Ostagar, and commands her daughter Morrigan to accompany them on their subsequent journeys. As part of Morrigan's personal quest, the Warden may choose to attack Flemeth and fight her in her High Dragon form, or simply allowing her to leave in peace and take her grimoire. Towards the end of the game, Morrigan reveals that Flemeth had instructed her to offer the Wardens a dark ritual prior to their confrontation with the Archdemon; as long as Morrigan has made the necessary preparations and is impregnated with a child who will then carry the soul of the Archdemon upon being slain, the life of the Grey Warden who dealt the final death blow to the Archdemon will be spared, her goal being to preserve an "Old God" soul within the Archdemon. The player has the option to decline the ritual, or acquiesce to Morrigan's offer by having a male Warden character copulate with her.

In Dragon Age II, Flemeth saves the Hawke family along with Aveline Vallen from the darkspawn as they attempt to escape the Blight in Lothering, and implores them to deliver an amulet to the Dalish Keeper Marethari at Sundermount near Kirkwall. Later in the game it is revealed that regardless of what happened in Origins, she ensured her survival through the amulet which the Dalish elves in Sundermount then use to restore her. She warns Hawke and company that the world is about to change before departing.

In Dragon Age: Inquisition, she provides the Inquisitor and Morrigan with guidance on how to defeat Corypheus. If Morrigan's son Kieran exists, Flemeth meets with him and, if he has the Old God soul, extracts it. If Kieran does not exist, Flemeth is inadvertently summoned by the individual who drank from the Well of Sorrows. In all cases, she reveals that she is possessed by the remnants of the elven goddess Mythal's spirit, and that she has apparently been working throughout the centuries to secure the goddess the justice that was denied to her. In the post-credits scene of Inquisition, Flemeth meets Solas, who is revealed to be the elven god Fen'harel. She is then petrified and had her power, and possibly the soul of the Old God, drained by Solas, leaving her fate unknown.

== Promotion and merchandise ==
Flemeth, as both a humanoid and a dragon, is featured prominently in promotional material, advertisements, and cover art for Dragon Age II. Mulgrew, in character as Flemeth, was the narrator of the official Dragon Age II cinematic trailer released in August 2010.

Flemeth's dragon form was recreated by sculptor Joe Menna, with input from BioWare, in the form of a statue at 4.5" tall and 12" wide.

== Reception ==
Flemeth has received a positive reception; her enigmatic, transcendent nature has prompted discussions about unresolved stories and sub-plots which involves her within series lore, even after the character's apparent death in Inquisition. In her 2015 research paper published in the Journal of Comparative Research in Anthropology and Sociology, Elisabeta Toma argued that Flemeth is a notable elderly female video game character with power and agency, who subverts many associated gender and age stereotypes in video games or exploits them for her own purposes. Hawkins wrote that Flemeth is a very distinctive older female video game character as she is "not fragile or terribly kind, nor is she evil and merciless". In her thesis titled "The Broodmother as Monstrous-Feminine—Abject Maternity in Video Games", Sarah Stang suggested that Flemeth's various identities as a mother figure, an older woman, a witch, and a shapeshifter corresponds to the aspects of the monstrous feminine figure as proposed by Stang, though Stang felt the character is an interesting subversion as she is not presented as simply another monster to be slain.

Russ Fruschtick from MTV praised Mulgrew for her articulate explanation of Flemeth's character; he found it rare that voice actors are as committed as Mulgrew to the roles they play, and concluded that BioWare chose "the perfect actress to handle such a compelling character" with the intensity and passion she displays. Andrei Dumitrescu from Softpedia said Mulgrew delivered "superb" voice acting for the character. Carol Pinchefsky from Syfy enjoyed Mulgrew's performance as Flemeth, as it reminds her of Mulgrew's previous role as Arachnia, Queen of the Spider People, in the Star Trek: Voyager episode “Bride of Chaotica!.”

Flemeth's redesigned appearance is well received, being a popular subject for fan art, cosplay and other forms of fan labor. Hawkins commented that Flemeth's costume is "simultaneously plain and imposing, modest and yet sexually-charged", a visual representation of her characteristics which is lacking in most older female characters depicted in popular media.

The boss fight with Flemeth as a dragon in Origins has been noted by Tom's Hardware and Den of Geek for its high difficulty.

=== Analysis ===
In an essay published in Ctrl-Alt-Play: Essays on Control in Video Gaming, Karl Babij cited the conflict between Morrigan and Flemeth in Origins, with the player character being asked to choose between slaying Flemeth or sparing her and deceiving Morrigan as an example of a truly ethical game structure; since the player must deal with the consequences of their actions as the sole moral agent in the absence of any obvious notion of good or evil, this allows them to exercise full control over the ethics of the given situation. Janine Hawkins from Paste Magazine noted that Flemeth is generally indifferent about anything that does not directly concern her, but she presents herself as a powerful ally on several occasions. Kimberley Wallace of Game Informer commented that, "whether Morrigan or Flemeth can be trusted is a lingering question, as they always seem to have ulterior motives".

In a study about English accent stereotypes in fantasy role-playing games, Eugen Hellström noted that Flemeth's accent points towards a prestigious General American accent, and her speech is rhotic with her consistent pronunciation of the phoneme /r/ at the end of words and before consonants.
