= Alistair (Dragon Age) =

- Dragon Age character
- Illustration of Alistair from Dragon Age: Those Who Speak #1
- First appearance: Dragon Age: Origins (2009)
- Voiced by: Steve Valentine

In-universe information
- Home: Ferelden
- Class: Warrior
- Specialization: Templar

Alistair is a fictional character in Dragon Age, a role-playing video game series created by Canadian video game developer BioWare. He is introduced as one of many companions that can join the party of the player character in Dragon Age: Origins. Alistair is a Grey Warden who fought alongside The Warden against the Darkspawn to end the Fifth Blight. Alistair is eventually revealed to be the illegitimate child of King Maric, making him an heir to the throne of Ferelden. Depending on the player character's choices during the events of Dragon Age: Origins, Alistair may be installed as king of Ferelden, remain as a Grey Warden, become a wandering drunk, or be executed by Queen Anora.

Alistair has been featured in several Dragon Age games, novels, and graphic novels. The characterization of Alistair is based on a combination of both Xander Harris and Mal Reynolds. Various video game publications have considered Alistair to be one of the most likeable and memorable characters in Dragon Age: Origins, and have praised him for his humor, his banter with fellow Dragon Age companion character Morrigan, his relatability, and the voice acting talent provided by Steve Valentine. In spite of being generally well-received, Alistair has received some criticism for purportedly being too similar to previous BioWare-created characters.

== Concept and characteristics ==
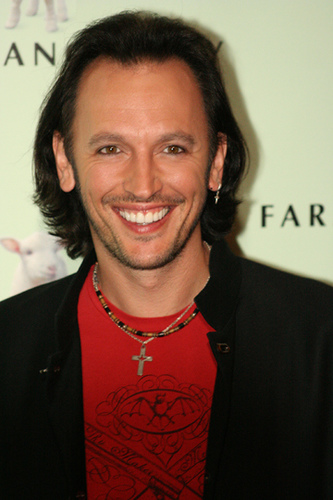
Steve Valentine, the voice of Alistair.

Alistair was mainly written by David Gaider, the lead writer of Origins, and is voiced by Steve Valentine. The character is named after actor Alistair Appleton. Alistair is a relatively new Grey Warden, who are a group devoted to fighting Darkspawn. He is believed to be the secret son of King Maric and a serving girl, and was originally raised in Redcliffe Castle by Arl Eamon after his mother's death. However, he was later given to the Chantry for training as a templar, a military order who are trained to kill "apostates" (mages outside of the Circle of Magi) and watch over the Circle of Magi. Alistair is described as having a "wry sense of humor", and makes many sarcastic remarks during the game. Alistair was originally written to be a "grizzled Grey Warden veteran", as per Dragon Age's original lead designer James Ohlen. However, such a character would be unlikely not to lead, and the character would have to start out at a low level. Gaider changed the character, and drew some inspiration from the characters Xander Harris and Mal Reynolds. Similarly, Gaider also originally wanted to have Mal's actor Nathan Fillion voice the character, but decided against it as he would have had to perform an English accent. However, Gaider was still pleased with Valentine's voicing.

Commenting on the tendency for a lot of games to feature heroes who are superheroes and have an otherworldly quality, Valentine was of the view that the best kind of "superheroes" are the ones who are insecure; he notes that Alistair is insecure, and that makes him very human and a great character for him to play. In an interview with GameZone, David Gaider said that Alistair was a bit of a "woo-bie" and that his romance was "very cute". However, Gaider said that he would not want to have another Alistair-like romance in the interest of originality.

== Appearances ==
=== In Dragon Age: Origins ===
Alistair is first introduced in Dragon Age: Origins as a junior Grey Warden once the player character reaches Ostagar, where the Grey Wardens are preparing for a battle against the Darkspawn. He accompanies the player character in organizing the preparation for their "Joining" ritual as part of their induction into the Grey Wardens, where they first encounter Morrigan, a Witch of the Wilds. After Loghain abandons the battle at Ostagar, leaving the Grey Wardens and King Cailan Theirin to die, he and the player are rescued by Flemeth. Being the last Grey Wardens in Ferelden, and all other Wardens beyond their reach as Ferelden's borders are closed, the player and he must use Grey Warden contracts to demand help from certain groups against the Darkspawn. Alistair also suggests contacting Arl Eamon, who resides in Redcliffe, to help convince the other nobles to help the player. Upon entering Redcliffe, Alistair will tell the player how he is actually the heir to the crown, but was hidden due to being a bastard and instead brought up by Eamon. He also expresses no wish to be king. He will then tell the player about his long-lost sister Goldanna, who lives in Denerim, and will ask to meet her. If brought to Goldanna, she will reject him, and the player may "harden" Alistair and tell him to stand up for himself more. If the player character is female, Alistair can be romanced.

After all the forces have been recruited by the player, Arl Eamon will call the "Landsmeet", a meeting between all of the nobles. The player will have to challenge Loghain's current regency by eroding the noble's support of him. After attending the Landsmeet, Alistair may either be made king where he assumes his position as head of the Theirin royal house, or Cailan's widow Anora may retain her position as queen. Alternatively, the player may choose to arrange a marriage between Anora and Alistair, though the latter requires persuading. If Alistair had been "hardened", he will reconsider and be less anxious of becoming king. The player may also either spare or kill Loghain. If Loghain is spared, Alistair will become so disgusted he will leave the player. If Anora is made queen and not married to Alistair, she will call for Alistair's execution if Loghain is spared. The player may interject and stop Anora, or let him be executed. If Alistair is spared, he is exiled and becomes a wandering drunk. If Loghain is killed and Alistair is not made king, he will simply return to being a Grey Warden. Finally, if Loghain was not spared and Alistair remained in the party, he may sacrifice himself killing the Archdemon – who destroys the soul of any Grey Warden who kills it – unless the player agrees to Morrigan's proposal or kills the Archdemon themselves.

Alistair will have a short appearance in Origin's expansion pack Awakening if placed as king during Origins. Alistair also appears in the game's Darkspawn Chronicles DLC as the final boss, with it being an alternate version of the game where the player character dies at the start and Alistair is left in charge, and the player playing as the Darkspawn. At the end of the DLC, the Darkspawn successfully kill Alistair and destroy Ferelden.

=== In Dragon Age II ===
If the player imports a world state where Alistair survives the events of Dragon Age: Origins, he makes a cameo appearance in Dragon Age II. If he remains a Grey Warden, he will appear during the Qunari invasion and tell Hawke that he regrets the Grey Wardens cannot help against the Qunari. If made king, he will briefly appear arguing with Meredith, head of the templars in Kirkwall. If exiled, he will become a drunk at "The Hanged Man", where Bann Teagan will show up and tell him that he can return to Ferelden.

=== In Dragon Age: Inquisition ===
Alistair also returns in Dragon Age: Inquisition as the King of Ferelden or a Grey Warden unless the player imports a world state from Dragon Age Keep where he died or became a drunk. If made king, he will make a brief appearance after the Inquisitor confronts Alexius in Redcliffe. If he remains as a Grey Warden, he will appear as Hawke's warden contact. He was branded a traitor by the Warden-Commander Clarel due to his opposition to using blood magic to stop the Blight. Afterwards, he will be trapped alongside the Inquisitor and Hawke in the Fade. Depending on the player's choice, Alistair will either sacrifice himself to help the Inquisitor to escape the Fade by battling a nightmare blocking the Fade's exit or escape with the Inquisitor while Hawke stays behind instead. If Alistair survives, he will send a report to the headquarters of the Grey Wardens in Weisshaupt Fortress.

=== Other appearances ===
Alistair is the main protagonist of a trilogy of Dragon Age graphic novels authored by David Gaider, which began with The Silent Grove. The overarching narrative tells Alistair's quest to find his father Maric with the help of Isabela and Varric Tethras. By the events of Dragon Age: Until We Sleep, the final installment in the trilogy, he eventually finds Maric, who was captured by a Tevinter Magister who used Maric's blood to enhance his power. After taking down the Magister, Alistair is forced to put his father out of his misery upon realizing that he was now unable to survive without the Magister's apparatus to which he was attached. He then returns to Ferelden to rule the kingdom the best he can. Alistair also makes a brief appearance in the novel Dragon Age: The Calling as an infant being given to his father by Fiona, his mother.

== Critical reception ==
Alistair has received a positive reception from critics, mainly for his sarcastic remarks and romance. Gamestm named Alistair as one of Bioware's eight most memorable companions. GamesRadar staff placed him at number 37 in a list of the 50 best game characters of the seventh generation of video game consoles, commenting "Dragon Age: Origins had plenty of memorable characters, but chief among them was the would-be bastard king Alistair." Tom Senior named Alistair as his personal favorite character, commenting that "A little laughter goes a long way, and Alistair shines as the self-aware bastard contender for the throne", and gave context that Origins can be very serious and dark in tone. The results of a match-up poll of Dragon Age characters hosted by Bioware as part of a March Madness theme in March 2015 revealed that fans voted the Origins Warden protagonist, Alistair, Varric Tethras and Morrigan as preferred party leader, warrior, rogue and mage in an ideal party respectively.

John Walker, writing for PC Gamer praised Alistair's conversations with Morrigan as one of the highlights of Origins. Eurogamer's Oli Welsh noted that Alistair and Morrigan are the "stars" of the game's companions; their bickering in particular evoked sexual tension in his view, a sentiment shared by his colleague Kieron Gillen from Rock, Paper, Shotgun. Nevertheless, he criticized their respective storylines as being "contrived" and their dialogue and animation as being "wooden and stiff". Rock, Paper, Shotgun's Alec Meer liked Alistair, and commented that he had some nice comic deflections. He said that Alistair, along with Shale, brought needed levity to the otherwise grim world of Dragon Age, describing the both of them as the game's most vital voices. Meer also commented that Alistair made him wish he had made his character female, believing him to be a better love interest than Morrigan due to his cheery put-downs rather than her "snide oh-I'm-bit-naughty-me line". Mike Fahey, writing for Kotaku, praised Alistair as having some of the most amusing lines in the game during his review of Origins. Fahey particularly praised Steve Valentine's voice acting, calling Alistair's voice his favourite in the game and noting that many of Alistair's lines would have fallen flat were it not for Valentine's timing. During an interview with Ray Muzyka (the co-founder and CEO of BioWare), VideoGamer.com's interviewer said that while he did not like Alistair at first he grew to like him and his humour, although Muzyka himself did not like the character. Kirk Hamilton, also writing for Kotaku, called Alistair one of his favorite characters, and looked forward to seeing how he got on with the "worldly" Isabella during The Silent Grove. Walker believed that his friendship with Alistair had an "echo of reality", and felt that his sarcasm plus balancing his emotions and bravado "continue[d] to resonate".

Kieron believed that Alistair was BioWare's best attempt at a male romantic lead, being "good without-out being entirely punchable". While romancing Alistair, Edge's Chris Dahlen found he related more to Alistair than his female mage player character, and noted many similarities between his life growing up and Alistair. He also put some blame on him being male. Wesley Yin-Poole, writing for VideoGamer.com, felt that the sex scene with Alistair was short and unerotic, calling it an example of video games still needed to learn how to do sex. Walker again, this time writing for Rock, Paper, Shotgun, commented how when playing his male character his heart was always with Alistair, and felt like he was "using" Zevran when he romanced him. In an article on video game romances, 1UP.com commented on how Alistair grew and developed with the player, despite beginning as an uncertain "somewhat naive soldier". Natania Barron, writing for Wired GeekMom column, commented that there was something "devious and devillish" about romancing him due to his ex-Templar roots. Barron also mentioned how, after making him king, she was willing to restart the game as a Human Noble when she found out he would break up with her elf and that she "honestly cared" about securing his marriage. Barron favorably compared his romance to that of Anders' from Dragon Age II, saying that she "settled" for him and most likely chose him because he reminded her of Alistair. Kotaku republished a post by a modder who had made Alistair think his character was female, who felt unable to play the game for a month after Alistair broke up with his original male character.

Some writers have compared him to previous BioWare companions, such as Star Wars: Knights of the Old Republic's Carth Onasi. Meer commented on BioWare's repeated use of themes and called Alistair Dragon Age's "Carth"; mentioning how he is the first person you recruit, had a heart of gold and is the main female love interest. However, he did note how Alistair was not as "drippy" as Carth, and how he was more someone you could have a conversation with. During a criticism of BioWare's games, GameZone's Dave Snell believed that many characters were too similar, specifically calling both Carth and Alistair the "snarky young upstart". John Walker, this time writing for Rock, Paper, Shotgun, felt that Alistair bucked the trend of BioWare making all the starting companions tedious. Similarly, several writers compared Anders to Alistair.
