= Dragon Age =

Video game series by BioWare (2009-present)

- Logo since 2024
- Genre: Role-playing
- Developers: BioWare; EA2D; Edge of Reality; TransGaming; Capital Games; Failbetter Games
- Publisher: Electronic Arts
- Creators: David Gaider and BioWare
- Platforms: Xbox 360; Microsoft Windows; PlayStation 3; OS X; Flash; Facebook Platform; iOS; Android; Google+; PlayStation 4; Xbox One; PlayStation 5; Xbox Series X/S
- First release: Dragon Age: Origins; November 3, 2009
- Latest release: Dragon Age: The Veilguard; October 31, 2024

Dragon Age is a media franchise centered on a series of fantasy role-playing video games created and developed by BioWare, which have seen releases on the Xbox 360, PlayStation 3, Microsoft Windows, OS X, PlayStation 4, Xbox One, PlayStation 5 and Xbox Series X/S. The franchise takes place on the fictional continent Thedas, and follows the experiences of its various inhabitants.

The series currently comprises four main entries: Dragon Age: Origins (2009), Dragon Age II (2011), Dragon Age: Inquisition (2014), and Dragon Age: The Veilguard (2024). The first three main series games have also been joined by a variety of expansions and downloadable content (DLC) add-ons.

The games have met with commercial success as well as positive acclaim for their narrative, lore, character development, voice acting, and emphasis on player choice. In addition to video games, the franchise has expanded to other media, including spin-off games, novels, graphic novels, comic books, a web series, an animated film, an animated television series, as well as other licensed products and merchandise.

== Premise ==
Map of Thedas featuring the main regions of the setting

The Dragon Age franchise is set in the world of Thedas (an acronym for The Dragon Age Setting), with events from the main series games taking place primarily in its southern regions. Thedas is the only continent of the known world and consists of various clans, nations and states inhabited by multiple humanoid peoples. Several kingdoms and countries have emerged over nine centuries of a calendar era based on the traditionally reckoned year of the founding of The Chantry, the dominant religious organization in the Dragon Age series, and each century is referred to as a separate "Age". Three out of several human nations play a prominent role in the series: the kingdom of Ferelden to the southeast of Thedas, which is politically organized in a similar manner to the English peerage system; the Orlesian Empire to the west of Ferelden, where its nobility is notorious for undermining each other with intrigue and subterfuge in their jostling for favor and patronage with its absolutist ruler; and the Tevinter Imperium in the northern region of Thedas, which once subjugated southern Thedas during ancient times, and is governed by a powerful magocracy of magic-wielding magisters led by an Imperial Archon. Other noteworthy civilizations explored in the main series games include the Free Marches, a human-dominated confederation of politically independent territorial entities to the north of Ferelden, and the Kingdom of Orzammar, one of the few remaining dwarven city states scattered throughout the Deep Roads, an underground highway system beneath the surface of Thedas created by the dwarves millennia ago.

Race, class, and heritage combine to determine social class and political dynamics in Thedas. A recurring theme in the series consists of power struggles and internal conflicts play out between and within various factions. Tevinter society practices slavery, which is outlawed and stigmatized in other human societies. Human nobility are treated with deference and respect across Thedas, whereas elves are often viewed as second-class citizens who live within overpopulated ghettos in human cities called alienages, or kept as slaves in the Tevinter Imperium. A significant portion of the elven population of Thedas call themselves the Dalish after the Dales region in eastern Orlais where an elven polity once stood. They proudly live a nomadic lifestyle away from the urban settlements of their city elf counterparts in an attempt to preserve and reclaim their cultural heritage, which was mostly wiped out millennia ago when the ancient elven empire of Elvhenan, which spanned most of Thedas, mysteriously collapsed. Dwarven society is organized around a rigid caste system and a form of ancestor worship. While the dwarves cannot wield magic themselves, their economic activity primarily revolves around the mining of lyrium, a mineral substance which powers the practice of magic, which they trade with the surface world. Some dwarves live on the surface, voluntarily or otherwise: they are considered "casteless" and are usually unwelcome within dwarven societies in the Deep Roads.

A fourth sapient humanoid species unique to the setting are the Qunari, meaning "People of the Qun" in their language. Qunari is an umbrella term used to describe both the race of large horned humanoids who hail from settlements in the far north of mainland Thedas, in particular the island states of Par Vollen and Seheron, as well as converts from other races to their civil religion known as "The Qun", which guides the Qunari's egalitarian yet strictly regimented society. The Qunari government is a totalitarian regime ruled by a triumvirate of leaders who represent the body (military), the soul (priesthood), and the mind (merchants and craftsmen) of their people. Individuals who are born outside of Qunari society are known as Vashoth, while those who abandon the Qun's fundamentalist teachings become known as Tal-Vashoth and are considered traitors or enemies to Qunari society. Renowned as formidable warriors, the Qunari are taller, larger, and more physically robust than other humanoid races in Thedas. They usually have skin of varying metallic colors, white or light-coloured hair, pointed ears, and eyes with colors like violet, red, silver, or yellow. Unlike other races, Qunari do not adorn themselves with tattoos or wear helmets, instead making use of war paint called Vitaar which provides a ceremonial purpose as well as practical benefits. The Qunari are locked in a perpetual conflict with the Tevinter Imperium and often seek to spread their influence throughout Thedas via covert agents or military offensives.

Magic-wielding characters known as mages are born with an uncommon gift for magic that is identified early in their lives, but they are not always in control of their own power. Mages have access to the Fade, a mysterious parallel dimension that is linked to the physical world and home to various spirit beings. It is a metaphysical realm that is normally accessible only to sapient beings (except for dwarves) when they dream: individuals who have the potential for magic have direct access to the Fade unlike most people, and conversely the Fade's inhabitants have direct access to these aforementioned individuals. A lapse in judgment or vigilance may result in the mage being unwittingly possessed by demonic spirits and utilized as vessels to come out of the Fade. Lyrium is critical to magic use as it enables the channeling of magical energy from the Fade; it is blue in color, though another more dangerous variety known as red lyrium is introduced in Dragon Age II. Some mages practice a form of forbidden magic known as "blood magic", which is powered by the blood of living beings instead, and sometimes use their power to deliberately summon demons to do their bidding.

Mages in southern Thedas are cloistered into training facilities called Circles of Magi by The Chantry, which teaches that "magic must serve man, not rule over him". The Chantry is a monotheistic religion that worships a personal god known as the Maker and venerates the prophet Andraste, a former slave who led an uprising against the Tevinter Imperium in a movement called an "Exalted March". The Chantry is led by the Divine, who is exclusively female and considered one of the world's most powerful people because of her extensive cultural, diplomatic, political, and spiritual influence over the peoples of Thedas. Mages who live outside the Chantry's control, which includes the Dalish clan chieftains known as Keepers, are considered to be extremely dangerous by many societies in Thedas. The Chantry has a military wing, the Templar Order, who are specially trained to seek out and subdue wayward "apostate" mages by any means necessary. This is in contrast to a tolerant view of mages in Tevinter society due to influence from the Imperial Chantry denomination, which historically broke away from the mainline Andrastian Chantry and utilize Imperial Templars as law enforcement under the authority of the magisters instead. While Tevinter mages practice their talent for magic without sanction in their homeland, on the other extreme the Qunari physically shackle their mages (termed Saarebas, meaning "dangerous thing,") due to their deep distrust of the practice of magic.

The Darkspawn and their recurring Blights are considered to be the single biggest threat to the civilizations of Thedas. The dwarves in particular have a specialized group of warriors known as the Legion of the Dead to fight the Darkspawn, though their civilization is a shadow of what it once was due to an unceasing war of attrition against the constant threat. The rest of Thedas rely on the Grey Wardens to disperse the Darkspawn hordes whenever they arrive on the surface during a Blight: the Wardens' goal is to slay the Archdemons, the corrupted Old Gods of the Tevinter Imperium, heralding each Blight. The first game in the series, Dragon Age: Origins, begins on the eve of the fifth Blight. Other major threats faced by the peoples of Thedas include cults and paramilitary groups corrupted by dark magic, such as the Venatori and the Red Templars; demons from the Fade, unleashed as part of a massive inter dimensional invasion during the events of Dragon Age: Inquisition; and dragons, long thought to have been extinct for many centuries, until their reemergence by the end of the Blessed Age caused the then-ruling Divine to name the next Age as the Dragon Age, the century in which the vast majority of the Dragon Age series takes place.

== Media ==
Release timeline Main series in bold
2009	**Dragon Age: Origins**
2010	Dragon Age: Origins – Awakening
2011	**Dragon Age II**
2012
2013	Heroes of Dragon Age
2014	**Dragon Age: Inquisition**
2015–2023
2024	**Dragon Age: The Veilguard**

Year	Title	Developer	Platform(s)
2009	Dragon Age: Origins^{1}	BioWare	Microsoft Windows, PlayStation 3, Xbox 360, OS X
2009	Dragon Age Journeys^{2}	EA2D, BioWare	Web browser
2010	Dragon Age: Origins – Awakening^{3}	BioWare	Microsoft Windows, PlayStation 3, Xbox 360, OS X
2011	Dragon Age II^{4}	BioWare	Microsoft Windows, PlayStation 3, Xbox 360
2011	Dragon Age Legends^{5}	EA2D, BioWare	Facebook Platform, Google+, Web browser
2013	Heroes of Dragon Age	EA Capital Games	iOS, Android
2014	Dragon Age: The Last Court^{6}	Failbetter Games	Web browser
2014	Dragon Age: Inquisition	BioWare	Microsoft Windows, PlayStation 3, PlayStation 4, Xbox 360, Xbox One
2024	Dragon Age: The Veilguard	BioWare	Microsoft Windows, PlayStation 5, Xbox Series X/S
Notes: 1 The PlayStation 3 and Xbox 360 versions of Origins were ported by Edge of Reality, while the Mac OS X version of the game was ported by TransGaming. 2 Requires Adobe Flash Player. 3 The Mac OS X version of Origins – Awakening was ported by TransGaming. 4 The Mac OS X version of Dragon Age II was ported by TransGaming. 5 Requires Adobe Flash player. A remixed version of Dragon Age Legends was released in May 2011. 6 Previously accessible via Dragon Age Keep on web browser.

=== Main series ===
==== Dragon Age: Origins ====
Dragon Age: Origins is the first game in the series, and was released for Microsoft Windows, PlayStation 3, and Xbox 360 in November 2009, and for Mac OS X in December 2009. Set in the kingdom of Ferelden during a period of civil unrest, the game puts the player in the role of a warrior, mage, or rogue coming from an elven, human, or dwarven background. The player character is recruited into the Grey Wardens, an ancient order that stands against monsters known as the Darkspawn, and is tasked with defeating the Archdemon that commands them and ending their invasion. BioWare described Origins as a spiritual successor to their previous Baldur's Gate and Neverwinter Nights franchises. Origins has received critical and public praise since its release, for its characters, story, voice acting, and traditional RPG combat and gameplay.

Dragon Age: Origins – Awakening is the expansion for the role-playing video game Dragon Age: Origins. Origins – Awakening adds a new campaign that takes place during the aftermath of Dragon Age: Origins. It was released for Microsoft Windows, OS X, PlayStation 3 and Xbox 360 on March 16, 2010, in North America, March 18 in Europe, and March 19 in the United Kingdom, and for the Mac OS X on August 31, 2010. It was later bundled with Origins and various DLC packs as Dragon Age: Origins – Ultimate Edition, released on October 26, 2010.

==== Dragon Age II ====
Dragon Age II is the sequel to Dragon Age: Origins, released for Microsoft Windows, PlayStation 3, and Xbox 360 in North America and Europe on March 8, 2011 and March 11, 2011. BioWare's Edmonton office began development of Dragon Age II during the production of Dragon Age: Origins – Awakening. The game puts players in the role of Hawke, a human mage, rogue, or warrior who arrives in Kirkwall, a city state in the Free Marches as a lowly refugee. Hawke becomes the Champion of Kirkwall over a turbulent decade of political and social conflict. Hawke is supported by several companions, most of whom play major roles in the game's plot and gameplay, and will either recognize Hawke as a friend or a rival depending on players' decisions and dialogue.

==== Dragon Age: Inquisition ====
Dragon Age: Inquisition is the sequel to Dragon Age II, released worldwide in November 2014 for Microsoft Windows, PlayStation 3, PlayStation 4, Xbox 360, and Xbox One. The game puts the players in the role of the Inquisitor, a warrior, mage, or rogue coming from an elven, human, dwarven or Qunari background, who survived a cataclysmic event which led to the creation of a mysterious tear in the sky called the "Breach", which is unleashing dangerous demons upon the world. The Inquisitor is viewed by some as the 'chosen one', as they have a 'Mark' on their hand capable of closing the Breach, and eventually becomes the leader of the titular Inquisition in an attempt to stop Corypheus, an ancient Darkspawn, who opened the Breach in the course of his attempt to conquer Thedas and achieve godhood. Dragon Age: Inquisition received critical acclaim since its release, with critics praising its story, voice acting, soundtrack, detailed environments, and engaging combat. It was awarded over 150 year-end accolades and nominated for more, including Game of the Year and Best Role-playing awards from several gaming publications.

==== Dragon Age: The Veilguard ====
The fourth Dragon Age game began development in 2015 under the codename "Joplin", however, development for "Joplin" was cancelled in October 2017. The project was rebooted in 2018 under the codename "Morrison". In June 2022, the game's title was announced as Dragon Age: Dreadwolf and in June 2024, the game was retitled Dragon Age: The Veilguard. It released on October 31, 2024.

=== Spin-offs ===
==== Dragon Age Journeys ====
Dragon Age Journeys was a 2009 Flash-based browser game developed by EA2D. A tie-in to Dragon Age: Origins, players could unlock achievements in the game, which would unlock content in Origins. Its content was intended to be spread over three chapters. The first chapter of the game, The Deep Roads, was released as a free download in October 2009. The second and third chapters were never released as the project was ultimately cancelled.

==== Dragon Age Legends ====
Dragon Age Legends was a 2011 Flash game developed by EA2D for the Facebook Platform and Google+. Legends incorporated elements of strategy and tactical role-playing games in its gameplay. It served as a tie-in to Dragon Age II by unlocking additional content for players, and is also set in the Free Marches. A "remixed" version of Legends titled Dragon Age: Legends: Remix 01 which featured hack and slash gameplay was released in May 2011 and hosted by IGN. The servers for Legends were deactivated on June 18, 2012, although a modified offline version was released shortly afterwards as a free download.

==== Heroes of Dragon Age ====
In 2013, EA released Heroes of Dragon Age, a free-to-play game for mobile devices. The game is battle-based, featuring digital 3D figurines of characters from the Dragon Age universe. Rather than introducing new lore, the game is based on "what if?" scenarios drawn from plotlines in the existing games. The sunset for Heroes of Dragon age was announced in November 2022 with the servers slated to go down on January 23, 2024.

==== Dragon Age: The Last Court ====
Dragon Age: The Last Court was a free-to-play browser game released in November 2014, with its gameplay focused on drawing cards and managing resources. Set between the events of Dragon Age II and Dragon Age: Inquisition, players would assume the role of the Marquis of Serault, a marquisate located on the western edge of Orlais. Previously accessible from the online platform Dragon Age Keep, The Last Court was taken offline by November 17, 2020, although fans led a project to preserve its contents prior to the due date. In 2025, another fan rebuilt the preserved content into a free, playable adaptation.

=== Other media ===
The Dragon Age franchise includes various types of media adaptations and merchandise outside of the video games. Its setting has been used by a variety of other media, including novels, comics, graphic novels, and licensed products such as a tabletop role-playing game, action figures, and statues.

==== Books and novels ====
- Dragon Age: The World of Thedas Volume I was released April 2013. This comprehensive guide offers detailed insight into the lore of the Dragon Age universe, including the geography of Thedas, races, and magic.
- The Art of Dragon Age Inquisition was released November 2014. It features concept art for the third game in the series.
- Dragon Age: The World of Thedas Volume II was released May 2015. Expanding upon Volume I, this edition includes insight into the cast of characters across the franchise. It also features The New Cumberland Chant of Light (an edition of the text central to the worlds fictional religion 'The Chantry'), The Seer's Yarn: A Treasury of Tales for Children All Over, and a mini cookbook called The Whole Nug Culinary Treasures of Thedas.
- Dragon Age: Tevinter Nights, an anthology of short stories by various writers, was released on March 10, 2020.
- Dragon Age: Hard in Hightown, a 72-page novella written by Mary Kirby (under the pen name of Varric Tethras), was released on July 31, 2018.

There are currently five novels set in the Dragon Age universe:

- Dragon Age: The Stolen Throne, written by David Gaider, was released on March 3, 2009.
- Dragon Age: The Calling, written by David Gaider, was released on October 13, 2009.
- Dragon Age: Asunder, written by David Gaider, was released on December 20, 2011.
- Dragon Age: The Masked Empire, written by Trick Weekes, was released on April 8, 2014.
- Dragon Age: Last Flight, written by Liane Merciel, was released on September 16, 2014.

==== Comics ====
- Dragon Age: Origins, a webcomic by the artist of Penny Arcade, was released in September 2009. It tells a story about a group of Templars sent on a search & destroy mission against Flemeth, the Witch of the Wilds. The timeline is set before the game Dragon Age: Origins, as her daughter Morrigan has not yet allied with the Grey Wardens.
- Dragon Age: Origins - Awakening, a webcomic by the artist of Penny Arcade, was released in 2010. This short story tells how Nathaniel Howe broke into Vigils Keep prior to his arrest in Awakening right before meeting The Warden.
- Dragon Age: The Revelation, written by David Gaider, was published in March 2010 on BioWare's website, and features art from Aimo. The story is based on a script from the video game Dragon Age: Origins that did not make the final release. It details a meeting between Morrigan and Alistair after the Grey Wardens learn from Riordan that in order to kill an Archdemon the warden who slays the beast must die. Morrigan seeks out Alistair to ask his advice on the lengths one would go to help a friend in need. The story assumes a female warden as Duncan's last recruit and ends with Morrigan on her way to Alistair's bedroom to offer The Dark Ritual.
- Dragon Age, a comic series written by Orson Scott Card with the help of Aaron Johnson and first released by IDW Publishing in March 2010, tells the story of a mage becoming romantically involved with a Templar. It was originally released as a monthly publication over six months, which was later collected and issued as a single 133-page graphic novel. The story is set before the events of the video games and takes place in and around the Tower of Magi.
- Dragon Age: The Silent Grove, written by David Gaider and scripted by Alexander Freed, follows Alistair, Varric and Isabela as they uncover the truth behind Alistair's past at the Teleri Swamps in Antiva.
- Dragon Age: Those Who Speak, written by David Gaider and scripted by Alexander Freed, follows Alistair, Varric and Isabela as their investigation into King Maric's disappearance lead to the Tevinter Imperium.
- Dragon Age: Until We Sleep, written by David Gaider and scripted by Alexander Freed, concludes the story arc which began in The Silent Grove as Alistair, Varric and Isabela deal with the Qunari as well as the machinations of a powerful Tevinter magister.
- Dragon Age: Magekiller, written by Greg Rucka, was released from December 2015 to April 2016. Taking place concurrently with the events of Dragon Age: Inquisition, the story follows Marius, a mage-hunting mercenary, and Tessa Forsythia, his assistant, as they progress through Thedas to seek for their targets. The story aims at "expanding the world of Dragon Age". The first issue of the comic was released on December 16, 2015.
- Dragon Age: Knight Errant, co-written by Nunzio DeFilippis and Christina Weir, was released between May and September 2017 and follows Ser Aaron Hawthorne and his squire Vaea, who become entangled in a dangerous recovery mission on behalf of the Inquisition. Magekiller and Knight Errant were later collected and re-released as a hardcover compilation titled Dragon Age Library Edition Volume 2.
- Dragon Age: Deception, co-written by Nunzio DeFilippis and Christina Weir, was released between October and December 2018. It follows Olivia Pryde, a failed actress turned con artist, as her attempt to target the scion of a Tevinter magister sets her into a fateful encounter with agents of the Inquisition.
- Dragon Age: Blue Wraith, co-written by Nunzio DeFilippis and Christina Weir, was released between January and March 2020. It features several major characters introduced in Magekiller, Knight Errant, and Deception, as well as the Dragon Age II companion character Fenris.
- Dragon Age: Dark Fortress, co-written by Nunzio DeFilippis and Christina Weir, was released between March and May 2021. It follows Fenris and several Inquisition agents as they attempt to break into an impenetrable fortress.
- Dragon Age: The Missing, written by George Mann, was released between January and May 2023. It is a tie-in set directly before the events of the fourth entry of the main game series, Dragon Age: The Veilguard.

==== Tabletop role-playing game ====
- Dragon Age has been adapted into a tabletop role-playing game by Green Ronin. The game uses a new game system using three six-sided dice, called the "AGE System". The game's initial release was as a boxed set including a Player's Guide, Game Master's Guide, map of Ferelden and three dice released on January 25, 2010. Two more boxed sets were released to carry characters to higher levels. The complete game has also been released as a hardcover book called the Dragon Age RPG Core Rulebook.

==== Film and television ====
- An anime film adaptation called Dragon Age: Dawn of the Seeker was announced on June 7, 2010. It was co-produced by BioWare, EA and anime company Funimation Entertainment. It was released in Japanese theaters on February 11, 2012. The plot of this film provides backstory for a young Cassandra Pentaghast, who is on a quest to save the Chantry from a group of blood mages that has gained the ability to control dragons.
- A Dragon Age streaming television adult animated series, titled Dragon Age: Absolution, was announced at Netflix's June 2022 Geeked Week event; it premiered on December 9, 2022. It was to feature new characters and was in the Tevinter Imperium. Mairghread Scott is the showrunner and it was produced and animated by Korean studio Red Dog Culture House.

==== Web series ====
- Dragon Age: Warden's Fall is a canonical five-part webseries, produced by Machinima in partnership with BioWare, and created on the Dragon Age: Origins toolset. Warden's Fall is an introduction to the events described in the expansion pack Dragon Age: Origins – Awakening. Its story depicts the beginning of the Grey Wardens' investigation into why the Darkspawn have not returned to the Deep Roads in the aftermath of the Battle of Denerim and the end of the Fifth Blight. It also explains how Kristoff came to the Blackmarsh, where he is found in Dragon Age: Origins – Awakening. The first episode aired on YouTube on 22 May 2010. The series features its own original soundtrack composed by Pakk Hui.
- American actress Felicia Day, in partnership with BioWare, released a six-part webseries called Dragon Age: Redemption. The web series premiered on October 10, 2011, one day before the release of the Dragon Age II DLC Mark of the Assassin, which features quests based around Day's character. The series is written by Day, who also serves as a co-producer. Filming took place over a dozen days in January 2011 in the L.A. area, with associate producer Peter Winther (Independence Day) as director and John Bartley (Lost) as cinematographer. It was teased as #mysteryproject on Day's Twitter feed for several weeks before the announcement of the project.
- Dragon Age: Vows and Vengeance is a canonical eight-part narrative podcast webseries, published weekly from August 29, 2024 to October 17, 2024 on YouTube and many podcast platforms in anticipation to the release of Dragon Age: The Veilguard. The web series is composed of eight short stories featuring podcast-exclusive characters and all the companions from the game. These podcasts were written by Will Melton and Jeremy Novick, with BioWare narrative support from Mary DeMarle and John Epler.

==== Other ====
- A series of four action figures was released by DC Direct. Series one includes action figures of Morrigan, Duncan, Loghain and a Genlock. Each highly detailed figure features game-accurate accessories and can be found in game and hobby shops and various online retailers.

== Gameplay ==
The Dragon Age video game series has featured varied gameplay mechanics; Origins was considered to be a traditional RPG, while subsequent entries are story-driven action role-playing games. The player assumes control of one primary character as the protagonist of the story of each main series game and customizes them based on gender, race (human only in Dragon Age II), physical appearance, and one of three character classes (warrior, rogue, and mage), with one or two specializations centered around the three class archetypes being made available to the player later in each game. This establishes a skill tree that the player can advance through killing enemies or completing quests (and thereby gaining experience points) until a preset value is met, whereupon they level up. Players usually conduct each main series game from a third-person perspective; control is done through a user interface that allows a player to move characters and give them actions to undertake, review information on on-going quests and the statistics of characters in their party, manage their inventories, and organize the formation of the party. Each game generally follows a main story pathway with points of branching narratives and multiple side missions, allowing the player to proceed through the game as they desire. The main protagonist also changes with each entry in the series. Secondary characters could be recruited as permanent or temporary companions by the player-controlled character over the course of the plot in each game. The player has the option to bring up to three of their companions with them whenever their traverse the game setting, and the player will have some degree of control over these companions, usually for combat sequences.

Origins present the player character almost as a blank canvas, whose visage, hairstyle, voice, race, first name, origin, gender, and class are chosen by the player. In the PC version, the point of view can be shifted from the third person view to a top-down isometric view, where friendly and hostile units are labelled with different colours to distinguish them. A party companion's approval or disapproval of the player character is represented by a scaling slider which appears on the specific character's individual screen. A companion character's scaling slider can be affected by dialogue choices, by the player character's actions, or by the giving of gift items which could be found throughout the game's narrative. The player character's standing on the scaling slider determines whether certain dialogue options are available; choosing the right dialogue options may potentially lead to higher approval, and unlock quests which the player character otherwise have no opportunity to perform. In lieu of a one-off loyalty check implemented in certain RPG games, the Warden's companions always take note of the decisions the player character makes, with their approval rising and falling in response to each decision. High approval may lead to a potential romance, while low approval might result in a companion leaving or even turning on the Warden and dying as a result.

Screenshot of the Tactical View mode in Dragon Age: Inquisition

In Dragon Age II and Dragon Age: Inquisition, the player engages in dialogue trees with non-player characters through story encounters and missions to learn information and progress the story. This is presented through what BioWare called a Dialogue Wheel, with the fully voice acted player-character reply options shown as choices extending radially outward from a circle at the bottom of the screen. Most of these choices are simple questions and responses, but in some dialogues, they offer additional choices that either influence how the game plays out from there, or are as a result from those previous choices. In Dragon Age II, the camera is locked in a third person perspective; in Inquisition, the player may access Tactical View, which pauses the game and shifts the camera to a top-down isometric view similar to Origins, allowing players to assign locations and orders to the party members and then resume the game to see their decisions play out.

''Dragon Age Keep'', launched in October 2014, was an online platform that allowed players to save their in-game choices in a "world state" and import them into new games. This affected the events and characters present in-game, most noticeably in ''Dragon Age: Inquisition''. The platform also allowed players to customize their world states and unlock various in-game items for ''Origins'' and ''Dragon Age II'' which were previously only available through limited promotional opportunities such as pre-order bonuses, platform exclusives, and as rewards from participation in special events.

Throughout the series, certain characters could enter into a romantic relationship with the player character: these included both hetero- and homosexual relationships as well as inter-species romances. This requires certain pre-requisite conditions such as gender and race being met, and possibly securing a high approval rating of the companion through the player character's actions and/or words. Successfully romancing a character would typically lead to scenes leading up to a sexual encounter though otherwise not showing anything inappropriate for the game's rating. The romance subplots in the series often take the form of side missions; they are not designed to be one-size-fits-all, and are entirely optional content.

== Development ==
Canadian video game developer David Gaider came up with most of the background lore for the franchise's setting and served as its lead writer until 2015. The name "Thedas" originated as shorthand for "The Dragon Age Setting". Thedas is a world inspired by European folklore and the romances of medieval Europe, with real world analogues used as the basis of some in-universe elements. For example, the nations of Ferelden and Orlais are based on medieval England and Renaissance-era France respectively. The Qunari's role within the setting is comparable to that of the historical Viking expansion. Gaider seeded numerous elements of lore all across Thedas during the developmental cycle for Origins, without any expectation that the material he wrote would ultimately be used for the final product. This left room for possible exploration of story elements or locations unused in Origins as the basis for tie-in material in other media, such as his debut novel Dragon Age: The Stolen Throne as well as subsequent sequels to Origin.

Although Dragon Age has been described as a dark fantasy setting, the series uses many common tropes in fantasy fiction, such as quests, the presence of magic as well as elves and dwarves in its narrative, and an overarching conflict between heroes and the forces of evil. Dragon Age also takes inspiration from A Song of Ice and Fire, a fantasy novel series by George R. R. Martin, particularly in the depiction of a morally ambiguous world where characters are often embroiled in no-win scenarios. An act of betrayal by the Ferelden lord Loghain Mac Tir which led to the disastrous outcome of the Battle of Ostagar as well as his final fate are thematically reminiscent of the treacherous political machinations depicted in A Song of Ice and Fire. The Grey Wardens' concept of a sworn brotherhood with its grim outlook and constant vigilance in anticipation of the threat of a monstrous invasion are particularly similar to that of the Night's Watch organization.

The art style for the series underwent a drastic overhaul under the leadership of art director Matt Goldman beginning with Dragon Age II, as the original art style for Origins was deemed to be "generic". The Darkspawn in particular were redesigned after the developers decided to portray them "like a complete and cohesive group" with an emphasis on their original concept as severely sickened creatures, whereas they have a more "hodgepodge appearance" in Origins which resembled J.R.R. Tolkien's orcs. The Qunari were initially presented in Origins as hornless, though the developers had originally intended for them to have horns, and as a result the Qunari's physical appearance underwent a redesign. Subsequent instalments in the franchise retroactively explained that most Qunari in fact have horns, and that hornlessness is a rare genetic variation found in certain individuals.

== Reception ==
=== Critical reception ===
Aggregate review scores As of October 31st, 2024.
Game	Metacritic
Dragon Age: Origins	(PC) 91 (PS3) 87 (X360) 86
Dragon Age II	(PC) 82 (PS3) 82 (X360) 79
Dragon Age: Inquisition	(PC) 85 (PS4) 89 (XONE) 85
Dragon Age: The Veilguard	(PC) 76 (PS5) 82 (XSXS) 85

The main series Dragon Age games have mostly been positively received. Dragon Age: Origins in particular is widely considered to be among the best video games of all time. Roberts consider Origins to be "an exhaustingly detailed RPG, with intricate combat and extensive ways to customise your party behind the scene", though "complex storytelling and characters" only occur in "infrequent flashes". He noted that Origins "did so much heavy lifting for building the world of Dragon Age that subsequent games have managed to find more interesting angles on its world." Richard Cobbett from Eurogamer described Origins as "a half-way house between the hardcore RPGs of old and a more modern style that was taking over, with an emphasis on the former". Its expansion pack, Origins - Awakening is also well received with both critics and fans across all release platforms.

Dragon Age II was released to generally favorable reviews from video game media outlets, but received a divisive reception from players. Most of their criticism was directed at the game's wave-based enemies, excessively reused environments, and the lack of origin choices. Several critics praised the game's faster-paced combat and the companions featured in the game, while the game's dialogue system and storytelling received mixed responses, and its use of a single setting with recycled assets and environments attracted some criticism.

Dragon Age: Inquisition garnered numerous game of the year awards and nominations from gaming publications for the year 2014. It also won a "Special Recognition Award" at the 26th GLAAD Media Awards for the game's "portrayal of LGBT characters". Roberts felt that Inquisition's "side quest-heavy open-worlds" went in a very distant direction from where the series began.

Sam Roberts from Gamesradar opined that unlike the Mass Effect video game series with its second entry, BioWare has yet to make "a truly great Dragon Age game" and that each main series game is flawed in some way. He observed that "BioWare keeps reinventing the mould, carrying across certain elements of the combat and remaining faithful to the fiction, but throwing a lot of stuff out. It's an approach that may eventually lead to a world-beating RPG".

Dragon Age: the Veilguard development was rife with challenges throughout the decade long gap between titles. Dragon Age: The Veilguard received "generally favorable" reviews from critics for its Windows, Xbox Series X/S, and PlayStation 5 versions according to the review aggregator website Metacritic. Veilguard won "Outstanding Video Game" at the 36th GLAAD Media Awards for its LGBTQ-inclusive content. Hayes Madsen of Rolling Stone called Veilguard a "fresh start for the franchise" with the game "practically a soft reset". Matt Purslow, from IGN, said that Veilguard was "at war with itself", as he felt that the game was not interested in exploring the franchise's past despite being its first direct sequel, and that the game sidelined major characters such as Solas and Varric. Andy Bickerton of NPR viewed the game as a "well-executed action RPG". However, he called the decision to not include prior player narrative choices a "letdown", noting that "it's easy to see how this squandered potential, along with the tonal inconsistencies, could have arisen out of Veilguard's near-decade of troubled production".

=== Sales ===
Dragon Age: Origins topped Steam's sales chart on November 10, 2009. The Digital Deluxe version of the game was ranked first place, with the standard edition ranked second. The Xbox 360 version of the game was the ninth-best-selling game in the US according to the NPD Group, selling approximately 362,100 copies. According to John Riccitiello, CEO of Electronic Arts, the company is very satisfied with the sales of Origins; more than 1 million DLC packs for the game were sold before the end of 2009. In February 2010, Electronic Arts announced that more than 3.2 million copies of the game had been sold.

Dragon Age II sold more than one million copies in less than two weeks following its launch on March 8, 2011, a faster sales pace than its predecessor when it was released in 2009. By May 2011, it had sold over two million copies.

Dragon Age: Inquisition is the most successful video game launch in BioWare's history based on units sold. Inquisition debuted at No. 5 in UK in its first launch week. According to retail monitor Chart-Track, it had sold almost the exact number of launch week copies as 2011's Dragon Age II. This does not take into account direct digital download sales however, which have been noted to be a "significant percentage of sales" by BioWare. As a result, the actual sales number is higher than reported. By September 2024, the game has sold over 12 million copies.

Dragon Age: The Veilguard topped the Steam charts and broke BioWare's concurrent player record. EA would later announce that the game engaged around 1.5 million players, underperforming by nearly 50% of the company's expectations and contributing to EA lowering its forecasts for its upcoming quarters.

=== Influence ===
Origins marked the point at which western RPGs properly moved into the spotlight, according to Cobbett. He stated that the success of Origins proved that "a hardcore, older-fashioned game could still find a devoted audience", and that it "established a new baseline for the genre in much the same way as the original Baldur's Gate back in 1998". Van Allen of US Gamer claimed that Bioware's work in character-driven AAA RPG Games has inspired "imitators in games like GreedFall", with gameplay that feels like the continuation of many concepts from Dragon Age.

The characters of the series, particularly the party companions, have received acclaim; they have often been compared to characters from the Mass Effect series in critic and reader lists and are considered some of the most memorable characters in video game history.
