= David Gaider =

Canadian writer and game designer

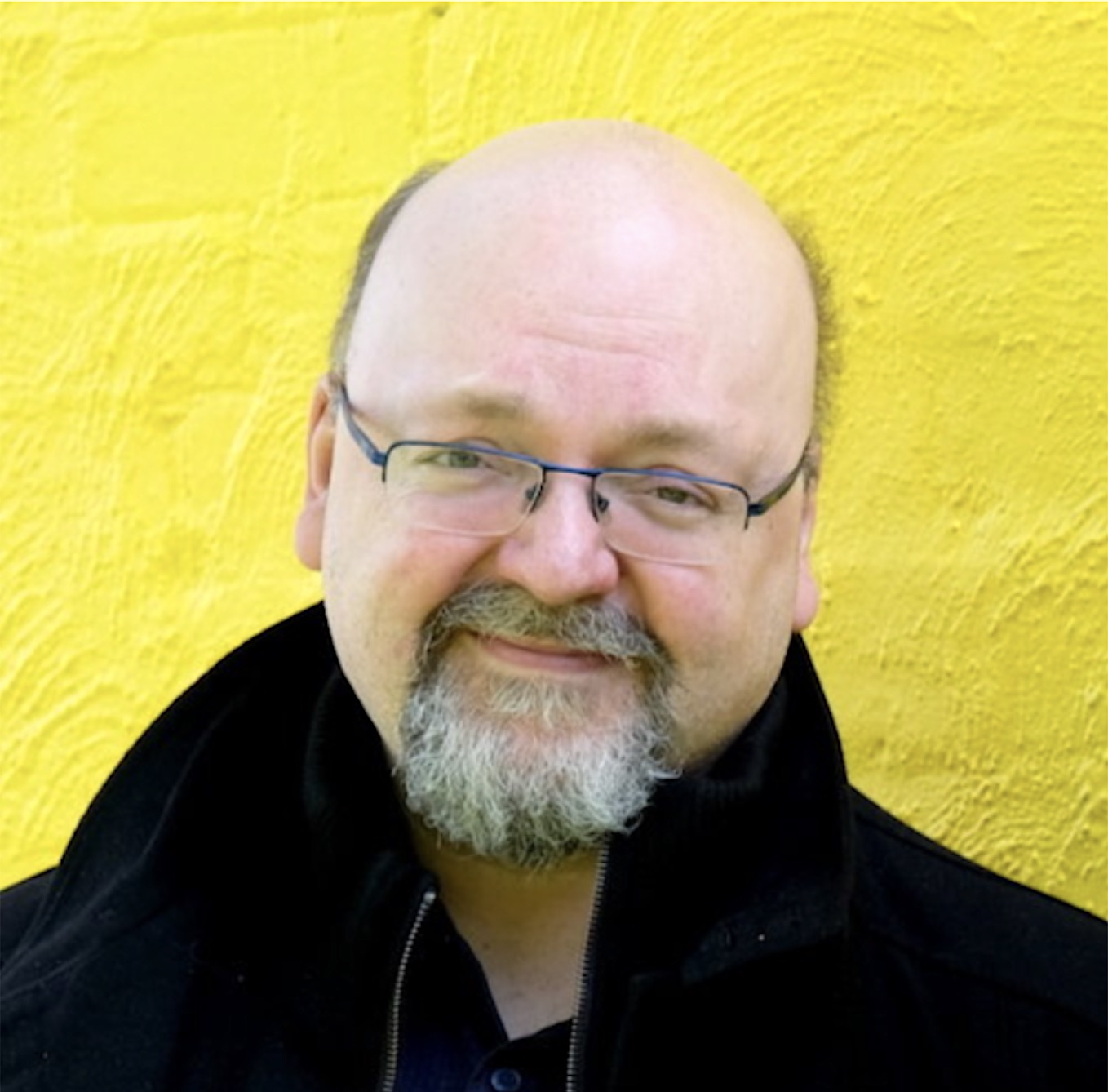
- Born: Canada
- Occupations: Video game writer Narrative designer Novelist; Comic book writer
- Writing career
- Years active: 1999–present
- Genres: Fantasy; Science fiction
- Notable work: Dragon Age

David Gaider is a Canadian narrative designer and writer. He was the lead writer and creator of the setting for the role-playing video game series Dragon Age.

He worked for Edmonton, Alberta-located game developer BioWare from 1999 to 2016, before leaving to join another Edmonton-based studio, Beamdog, as their Creative Director. He departed Beamdog after two years.

In 2019, Gaider announced the assumption of a Creative Director position at the then newly-founded Melbourne, Australia-based game developer, Summerfall Studios, and with that announcement, a project entitled Stray Gods: The Roleplaying Musical, which released later in 2023.

== Career ==
Gaider began his professional life in the service industry, eventually managing a small hotel, while game designing was a side hobby to him. In 1999, a friend who worked as an artist at a local game studio named BioWare (at that point having only recently achieved success with the release of Baldur's Gate) suggested to the studio founders, Ray Muzyka and Greg Zeschuk, that Gaider be given a newly-available position in the design department. Gaider got the job and, as his first assignment, was handed the task of writing for Baldur's Gate II: Shadows of Amn. The release of that title in 2000 was a great success for BioWare and cemented the studio as a major developer of role-playing games.

Gaider then worked on Neverwinter Nights (released in 2002) and Star Wars: Knights of the Old Republic (2003), for which he wrote the characters HK-47 (winner of the 2004 Game Developers Choice Awards for "Original Game Character of the Year"), Jolee Bindo, and Carth Onasi. An expansion for Neverwinter Nights, called Neverwinter Nights: Hordes of the Underdark, was the first title on which Gaider served as lead writer, responsible for the game's overall narrative design and managing the project's writers.

Gaider then assumed the role as lead writer on BioWare's new fantasy game, Dragon Age: Origins, which was released in 2009. He was also credited with the creation of the Dragon Age setting, the world of Thedas. He was responsible for the writing of the characters of Alistair, Morrigan, Zevran, and Shale, as well as the writing of the major quests, "Nature of the Beast" and "Redcliffe". Gaider also wrote the prequel novels to Origins, The Stolen Throne and The Calling, both released in 2009. Afterwards, Gaider continued to serve as lead writer in the expansion Dragon Age: Origins - Awakening (2010) and then the sequel game, Dragon Age II.

In Dragon Age II (2011), Gaider is credited with writing the characters Cassandra Pentaghast, Fenris, and Knight-Commander Meredith. He then penned the follow-up novel Asunder, which was released on 20 December 2011. In 2012, Gaider was the lead writer of The Silent Grove, a six-part comic series published by Dark Horse Comics. The Silent Grove was followed by its narrative sequels, Those Who Speak and Until We Sleep, also written by Gaider.

Gaider was again lead writer for Dragon Age: Inquisition, released in 2014, the third game in the Dragon Age series. The game won a number of major awards, including the prestigious DICE Award from the Academy of Interactive Arts & Science, as well as being selected by several gaming publications, including IGN, Game Informer, and Polygon as their Game of the Year. According to Electronic Arts' fiscal 2015 third quarter earnings report, Dragon Age: Inquisition is the most successful launch in BioWare history based on units sold. In early 2015, Gaider moved on to writing the story of Anthem. After Gaider's departure from Bioware the story was rewritten.

On 22 January 2016, Gaider left BioWare after 17 years in the company. In February 2016, he announced that he would assume a position as Creative Director at Beamdog, a studio known primarily for releasing updated versions of BioWare and Black Isle Studios role-playing titles. He left Beamdog in February 2018.

In 2019, Gaider co-founded Summerfall Studios, a Melbourne, Australia-based indie game company. The new studio's first project is Chorus: An Adventure Musical, funded both by Creative Victoria and a successful crowdfunding campaign on the Fig platform, which earned 690,079 USD from 6,018 backers as of November 10, 2019. The project was renamed to Stray Gods: The Roleplaying Musical by 2022, with Gaider still attached as Creative Director. The game was released in August 2023.

== Personal life ==
Gaider is openly gay. In February 2014, he wrote a post on his now-defunct Tumblr blog, detailing his experiences as a "[video game] developer who happens to be gay."

== Works ==
=== Video games ===
- Baldur's Gate II: Shadows of Amn (2000), Interplay Entertainment Corp.
- Baldur's Gate II: Throne of Bhaal (2001), Interplay Entertainment Corp.
- Neverwinter Nights (2002), Infogrames, Inc.
- Neverwinter Nights: Shadows of Undrentide (2003), Atari, Inc.
- Star Wars: Knights of the Old Republic (2003), LucasArts
- Neverwinter Nights: Hordes of the Underdark (2003), Atari, Inc.
- Dragon Age: Origins (2009), Electronic Arts, Inc.
- Dragon Age: Origins – Awakening (2010), Electronic Arts, Inc.
- Dragon Age II (2011), Electronic Arts, Inc.
- Dragon Age: Inquisition (2014), Electronic Arts, Inc.
- Anthem (2019), Electronic Arts, Inc.
- Stray Gods: The Roleplaying Musical (2023), Summerfall Studios
- Malys (2025), Summerfall Studios

=== Novels ===
- Dragon Age: The Stolen Throne (2009)
- Dragon Age: The Calling (2009)
- Dragon Age: Asunder (2011)

=== Comic books ===
- Dragon Age: The Silent Grove (2012)
- Dragon Age: Those Who Speak (2013)
- Dragon Age: Until We Sleep (2013)
