= Morrigan (Dragon Age) =

- Dragon Age character
- Render of Morrigan used to promote the Dragon Age: Origins DLC, Witch Hunt.
- First appearance: Dragon Age: Origins (2009)
- Created by: David Gaider
- Voiced by: Claudia Black

In-universe information
- Home: Korcari Wilds, Ferelden
- Class: Mage

Morrigan is a fictional character from BioWare's Dragon Age franchise, first appearing as a party member in Dragon Age: Origins. She is a shapeshifting Witch of the Wilds, one of several sorceresses whose legends originate in the Korcari Wilds region of the kingdom of Ferelden, the setting of Origins. Morrigan leaves her home to accompany the protagonist of Origins, the would-be Hero of Ferelden, at the request of her mother Flemeth to stop the monstrous Darkspawn from overrunning the world of Thedas. Morrigan also appears in Dragon Age: Inquisition and Dragon Age: The Veilguard as a supporting character. She is voiced by Claudia Black.

Morrigan has been very well received; she is considered one of the most popular and recognizable characters in the Dragon Age series. The character was featured prominently in promotional material and advertisements released by Bioware's parent company EA leading up to the release of Dragon Age: Origins and teasing her return in Dragon Age: Inquisition.

== Character overview ==
Morrigan's upbringing is drastically different than most characters encountered in Thedas, the setting of the Dragon Age series, and as a result she has not had many interactions or relationships with others because of it. The practice of magic is sanctioned and regulated by the Chantry, the dominant religious organisation of Thedas, and it is obligatory for all individuals with potential for magical powers to enroll in the Circle of Magi. Morrigan's refusal to conform makes her an apostate, a rogue mage who is isolated from civilization and an outsider who does not represent a facet of the world; she is thus presented as a cynical and antisocial witch in a world where many mages are feared for their power. Morrigan is quick to show her amoral worldview; she disapproves of actions that benefit people she perceives as worthless and/or which do not further the Warden's personal cause, such as helping a beggar or settling a dispute in Lothering. Her outlook on life is best described as "survival of the fittest", and she will approve if the Warden's choices match her beliefs. If the player chooses to play as a male protagonist, Morrigan can be romanced.

While she is not a playable companion in Inquisition, she is a major participant in the continuation of a lengthy plotline which began about midway through Origins, which would culminate in a milestone moment for the character.

== Development ==
Morrigan was mainly written by David Gaider, the lead writer of Origins. He intentionally wrote Morrigan so that she would talk a lot about herself throughout the game, while keeping players guessing as to how much of what she divulges is the truth or otherwise, and what her actual motivations are. Gaider claimed in an interview that he did not care if Morrigan comes across as being likeable, noting that there is "a certain kind of freedom when you don’t have to worry about making a character likeable because that’s a hard thing to sell.” Ray Muzyka, the co-founder and CEO of BioWare, explained in an interview that the inspiration behind creating characters like Morrigan came from the writing team, the design team and the art team working together to create a character they felt was compelling, and they would do that for every companion character that the player could bring into the game. Muzyka described Morrigan's personality as "challenging", although he does like the character on a personal level.

The creation of Alistair and Morrigan as character concepts, as they play the largest role in the game's plot, took far longer than other characters. Morrigan was originally conceived to be similar to Flemeth, speaking whimsically. However, Gaider was not satisfied and decided to completely rewrite her personality. As a result, she was redesigned as a "blunt" individual who has a strained relationship with Flemeth and always acts in defiance towards her mother. There was also an idea early in the developmental cycle for Origins to have an old lady narrate the origin story with a historical framing, as though it happened to her many years ago. The player would have initially thought it was Flemeth; an elderly Morrigan would be revealed as the narrator by the end of the game.

BioWare considered finding a suitable voice actor for Morrigan to be one of the most critical elements to a character concept. Claudia Black did not actually audition for the role of Morrigan; instead, she sent in a recording she had done to let BioWare know she is interested in future projects. BioWare settled on a different voice actress at one point, but decided that she was not suitable for the character concept they had envisioned. Gaider decided to cast Black as the voice of Morrigan as he was familiar with her work as Aeryn Sun in the science fiction television series Farscape. A few years after the release of Origin, Black would reprise her role as Morrigan for a promotional trailer of Dragon Age: Inquisition released in 2013; her delivery was very well received by Bioware staff. Black also reprised her role as Morrigan in 2024's Dragon Age: The Veilguard.

=== Visual design ===
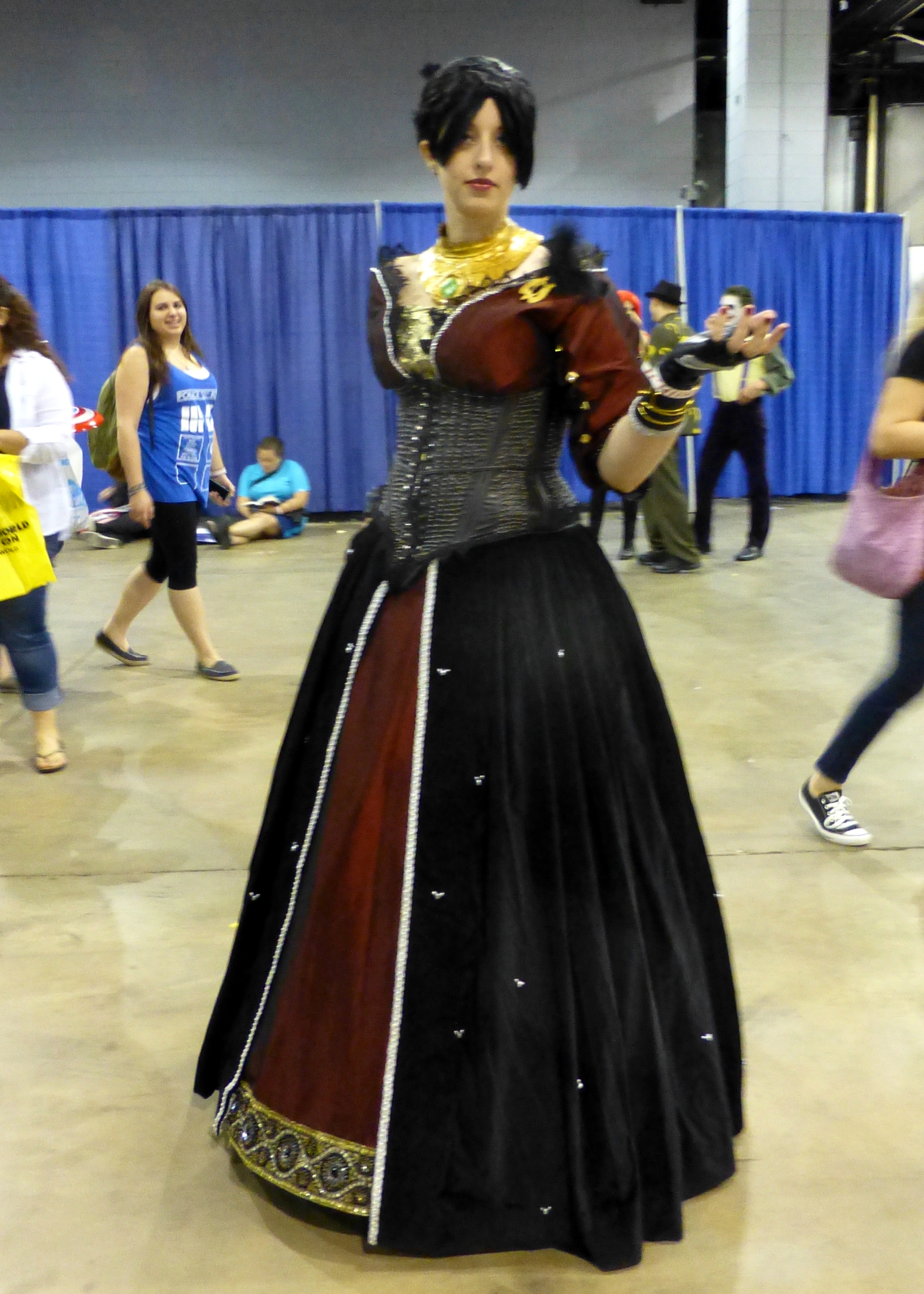
A cosplayer wearing a replica of Morrigan's Winter Palace dress at the Wizard World Chicago in 2014.

Morrigan's facial features was based on a model named Victoria Johnson. For her appearance in Dragon Age: Inquisition, the design team had concept several outfits designed for different climates, though ultimately her traditional outfit from her days in the Korcari Wilds was favored. During her initial appearance at a ball in Inquisition, Morrigan wears a black and purple gown decorated with feathers and black lace, and bound by a leather corset. Morrigan's gown is designed in the style of the Orlesian court, but the materials as well as palette of black and purple are reminiscent of her Origins outfit. The design of her dress "slyly layers the natural upon the ostentatious", and is a "cavalier, twitchy thumb to the nose of the pastel hues favoured by Orlesian fashion". Her son Kieran is dressed in Orlesian finery which evokes her trademark appearance.

In the lead-up to Inquisition's release, BioWare released character kits for the major characters of Inquisition in order to assist cosplayers; Morrigan was the first character. Her Winter Palace dress was recreated and exhibited by Jessica Merizan, then-BioWare community manager, during the PAX Prime event in 2014.

For her redesign in Dragon Age: The Veilguard, Morrigan's appearance was changed to reflect her evolution as a character in the 10 years that take place between Inquisition and The Veilguard. In order to reflect an evolution in her perceived relationship with her mother, her design was updated with a variation of Flemeth's crown.

== Appearances ==
=== In Dragon Age: Origins ===
Morrigan first appears to confront the Grey Wardens when they were searching for their old treaties with the nations of Thedas in the Korcari Wilds, and revealed that they have been taken by her mother Flemeth for safekeeping. Morrigan then joins the Warden's party following the battle at Ostagar where Flemeth have saved the surviving Grey Wardens of Ferelden from the Darkspawn hordes. Morrigan's personal quest involves a search for Flemeth's Grimoire, a book of spells and secrets from which Morrigan intends to learn. She later tasks the Warden with slaying Flemeth, who is alleged a demonic abomination who gives birth to a daughter and then, as she nears death, takes over the body of her offspring. This cycle repeats, and thus Flemeth lives on as if immortal. Upon the completion of the quest, where the player has the choice to either slay Flemeth in combat or let Flemeth go and lie to Morrigan, Morrigan is appreciative of their efforts and may even offer the player to 'join her in her tent', provided the player is not already in a relationship with another party companion.

Aside from potentially leaving the party because of a low approval rating, Morrigan may also leave the party near the end of the game before the slaying of the Archdemon; in the alternative, she will return to offer the ritual to the Grey Wardens if she had already left the party. She reveals that a Grey Warden need not die in order to slay the Archdemon as long as the Warden, Alistair, or Loghain if he has been recruited as a Warden, impregnates Morrigan with a child, who will then carry the soul of the Old God upon the Archdemon's death and thus spare the life of the Grey Warden who dealt the final death blow. If the player refuses to sleep with Morrigan or is female, and does not ask Alistair or Loghain to do the deed, she will become infuriated and leave the party permanently.

In addition to Origins, Morrigan appears in the game's DLC Witch Hunt, which explores her whereabouts following the end of the Blight and is presented as the conclusion of her storyline. The player character tracks Morrigan down one year after the Blight's end, finding her activating an Eluvian that will transport her to an unknown location and claiming that Flemeth is still alive regardless of the previous course of action taken in dealing with her. The player is given the choice of stabbing Morrigan, letting her go, or, if the player romanced Morrigan, going in with her.

Morrigan also appears in the game's Darkspawn Chronicles DLC, an alternate retelling of Origin's events where the player character dies at the start and Alistair is left in charge of Ferelden. Towards the end of the DLC, the player-controlled Darkspawn successfully kill Morrigan as well as her allies, and would eventually succeed in overrunning Ferelden.

=== In Dragon Age: Inquisition ===
Morrigan as she appears in Dragon Age: Inquisition.

Morrigan plays a significant role in the plot of Dragon Age: Inquisition, where she has managed to secure herself the position of arcane adviser to Empress Celene of Orlais. She meets the Inquisitor when the former is sent to the Empress' Winter Palace to foil an assassination attempt. After the threat has been dealt with, Morrigan is assigned by imperial decree to act as a liaison on behalf of Orlais and returns to the Inquisition's base. Depending on the decision made by the Warden in Origins, she may appear with her son Kieran, who either possesses an Old God soul if the ritual was performed or is a normal child if the Hero of Ferelden slept with Morrigan but did not go through with her plan. Morrigan proves invaluable during the Inquisition's mission to thwart the Elder One from reaching the Well of Sorrows, an ancient magical pool that contains the knowledge of the elven people. When they reach the Well, Morrigan announces her desire to absorb the powers of the Well for herself but if the Inquisitor is a mage, she can be convinced to stand down and allow them to drink instead.

If Morrigan's ritual was performed, Inquisition Spymaster Leliana will later inform the Inquisitor that Morrigan ran after Kieran through an Eluvian hidden within Skyhold. The Inquisitor catches up to Morrigan and find Kieran in the Fade with Flemeth. When the pair try to attack her, Flemeth reveals herself to be the embodiment of the long lost elven goddess Mythal and uses her magic to paralyse whoever drank from the Well. Flemeth delivers an ultimatum: she keeps Kieran and Morrigan is free to go or Kieran is returned to his mother but they will forever be hunted by her. Morrigan demands Kieran back and Flemeth agrees, absorbing the mystical Old God soul within him before departing. If Kieran is not in possession of the Old God soul or was never born, Flemeth is encountered after Morrigan performs a ritual with the Inquisitor at the Shrine of Mythal. If Morrigan drank from the Well, she gains the ability to shapeshift into a dragon and battles Corypheus' dragon. After the battle, Morrigan, and Kieran if he was born, leave the Inquisition for parts unknown. She also serves as the narrator of the epilogue for Inquisition.

=== In Dragon Age: The Veilguard ===
Morrigan returns as a recurring ally in the plot of Dragon Age: The Veilguard. In order to unlock one of the final endings of the game, player character and protagonist Rook has to locate a series of wolf statuettes in a sequence of side-quests that give an insight into the past of the game's main villain, Solas. As the narrative advances, Morrigan leads Rook into a private meeting with the Inquisitor in Dock Town, where the Inquisitor hands Rook the first of these statuettes. Once all statuettes have been collected, Rook has a conversation with Morrigan, where they learn that a part of the essence of the goddess of love, Mythal, still existed and could be key to stopping Solas. Rook then has to convince Morrigan that they are worthy of obtaining Mythal's essence to aid them in their fight against Solas, after which she will open a pathway that leads to the fragment. Rook has two options to obtain Mythal's essence: they can either convince the fragment that they are worthy via dialogue or defeat her in her dragon form.

During the game's final sequence, both Morrigan and Mythal's essence will make an appearance, provided that the side-quest has been completed. It is then that Rook can use Mythal's essence to convince Solas to back down and seal himself into the Fade, either alone or with a female elf Inquisitor if Solas had been romanced in Inquisition.

=== Other appearances ===
Morrigan appears in a short prequel web comic set also titled Dragon Age: Origins by the Penny Arcade artists, released on September 4, 2009. It tells the tale of a band of templars who were tasked with finding Flemeth, the Witch of the Wilds.

In 2010, Morrigan was included in DC Unlimited's Dragon Age themed range of video game figures, along with Duncan, Loghain, and a Genlock.

Morrigan appears as a companion in the flash based Facebook and Google+ game Dragon Age Legends, if the player unlocks "Morrigan Room" and places it in their castle.

Morrigan appears alongside Commander Shepard from the Mass Effect franchise as cameo characters in MySims SkyHeroes, the sixth game in EA's MySims franchise.

Morrigan, known as "The Scornful Sorceress", appears in Dragon Age: The Last Court a text-based, free-to-play browser game that is set between Dragon Age II and Dragon Age: Inquisition. She is on a mission for Empress Celene to rebuild an eluvian. She makes a detailed study of the Marquis of Serault's lineage, and particularly their great-grandfather, an apostate mage who is known as "The Shame of Serault".

== Reception ==
"The only time we really see a crack in her surly demeanor is if you befriend her—or bed her—and even then she holds her cards close to her chest. For the most part Morrigan is independent and not meant to be eye-candy or a trophy prize for the protagonist. She’s snarky, sassy, and sarcastic, a refreshing change from most female companions in RPGs who fawn over the protagonist and coddle their interests without question."

— Ryan Bates, "Women Who Rock Modern Gaming".

Morrigan has received a mostly positive reception since her debut appearance in Origins, and has appeared in several "top character" lists compiled by critics. Several sources drew attention to the character's spiteful personality as being particularly memorable. Welsh mentioned Morrigan as an example of Bioware's ability to create fascinating and memorable characters that players will still remember years later. During an interview with Muzyka conducted by a VideoGamer.com staff member, the interviewer expressed the view that "Morrigan will go down in history as one of the greatest RPG characters ever created", even though she is a "hard to please bitch". GamesRadar's Jordan Baughman identified Morrigan as an example of "The Recalcitrant Shrew", a minimally dressed and needlessly combative female companion character archetype found in other BioWare titles. Tom Senior thought of Morrigan as cool and mysterious, and that she is in an interesting place on the morality scale who employs dark methods for heroic reasons. Brittany Vincent from Syfy described her as "devilishly charming and yet vulnerable in an endearing way". Marshall Lemon from The Escapist enjoyed her cryptic personality and her tendency to keep others in the dark about her true intentions. He noted that by the end of Origins, "players hadn't even learned half of her mysteries".

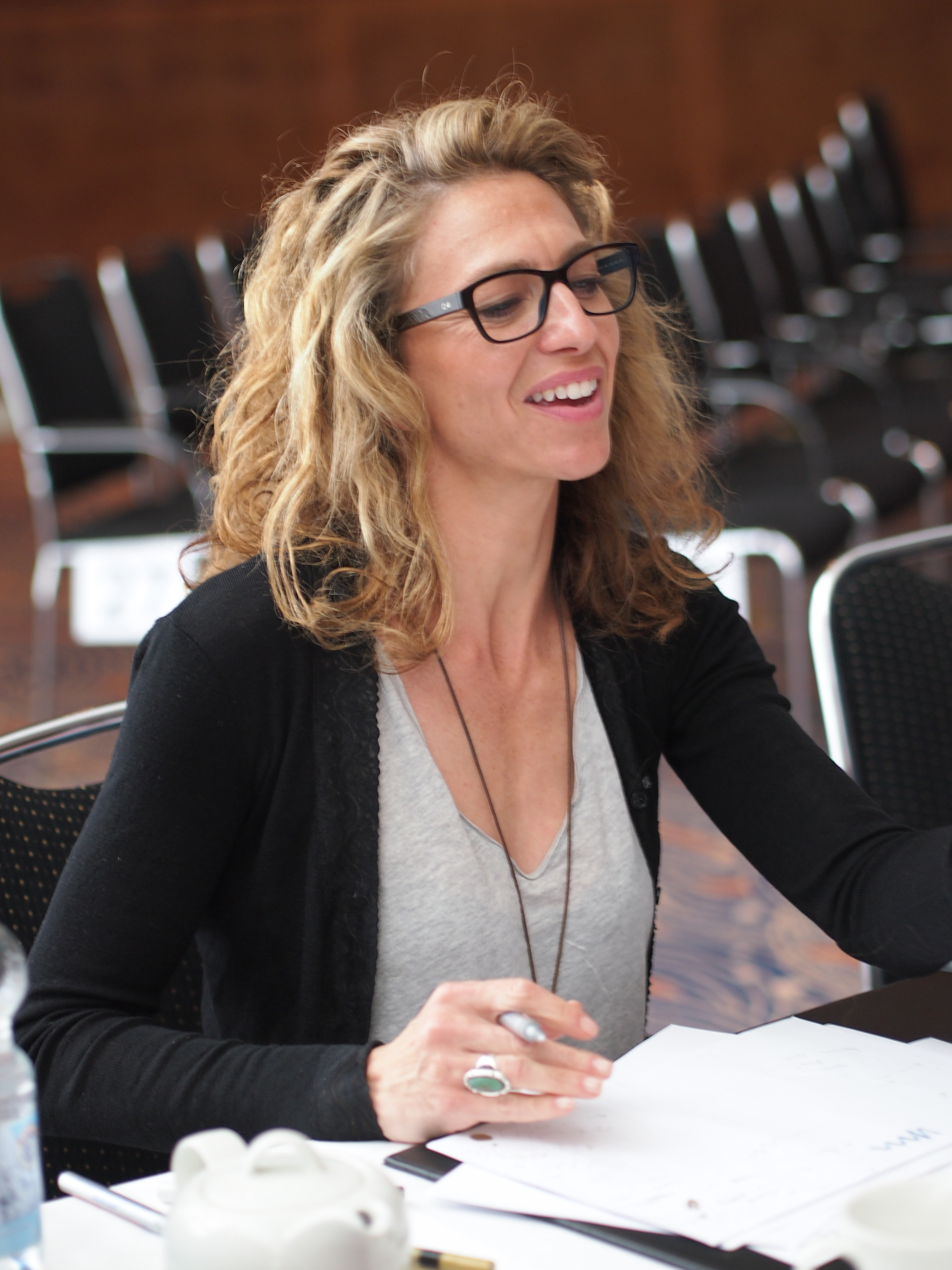
Claudia Black received praise for her performance as Morrigan.

In his review of Dragon Age: Origins, Dave Snider of Giant Bomb noted that while the game features superb voice acting all around, Claudia Black's performance as Morrigan stole the show. GameRevolution regarded her as "one of the most brilliant creations to come out of the Dragon Age series since it began in 2009", with Black's performance being praised for adding "an elegant touch to her crass cynical demeanor and the mystery of her motivations".

On the other hand, Kieron Gillen, also from Rock Paper Shotgun said that he could not stand Morrigan, although he claimed to have a clear mental image of her and her personality "burned" into his mind. Phil Savage from PC Gamer likes her sassiness but wondered if she would be just as interesting a character without her combative dynamic with Alistair. Alec Meer from Rock Paper Shotgun was similarly amused by her constant bickering with Alistair; he commented that Morrigan "seemed a textbook line in sneery, sultry know-it-alls", though he is certain there are "many more stings to be found in her self-confident tale". Oli Welsh, writing for Eurogamer, called Alistair and Morrigan the "stars" amongst the companions of Origins, but criticized their storylines as being "contrived", and the dialogue "wooden".

Morrigan is considered to be a fan favorite, even though she was not designed to be a likeable character. Her status as the most iconic of the characters introduced in Origins was acknowledged by Gaider. Vincent said that Morrigan's sarcasm and dry wit, as well as her "killer sense of style" and "gothic sensibility", have made her very popular among fans of the series. A reader's poll published by IGN in December 2014 for their top ultimate RPG party choices placed Morrigan at #4. The results of a match-up poll of Dragon Age characters hosted by Bioware as part of a March Madness theme in March 2015 revealed that fans voted the Origins Warden protagonist, Alistair, Varric Tethras and Morrigan as preferred party leader, warrior, rogue and mage in an ideal party respectively.

Commenting on her return to the Dragon Age series in Inquisition, Kimberley Wallace summarized Morrigan's appeal with fans and critics of the Dragon Age series to be her enigmatic mystique, biting wit, and bickering banter with Alistair.

=== Analysis ===
In her article Game Characters as Narrative Devices. A Comparative Analysis of Dragon Age: Origins and Mass Effect 2, Kristine Jorgensen identifies Morrigan as a character of crucial importance for the plot development of Origins. Morrigan's decision to reveal her true intention to join the Warden's party and to offer male members of the surviving Grey Wardens the opportunity to perform the ritual with her following the conclusion of the Landsmeet has two functions: she noted that Morrigan is positioned both as the Wardens' benefactor during their struggle to liberate Ferelden from the darkspawn hordes while preserving their lives at the same time, and as a potential antagonist in a sequel given the sinister implications of her giving birth to a child with the soul of a malevolent deity; it also works as catharsis (Note: catharsis is defined in this context as a "deeply transformative spiritual event" (Ryan 2001b, p.296) that takes the players through the terror and pity of tragedy, before relieving them as the Archdemon dies and Ferelden is saved.) by adding a second point of no return situation for the player to experience.

== See also ==
- List of fictional witches
