= Varric Tethras =

Video game character

- Dragon Age character
- Varric, as he appears in Dragon Age II
- First appearance: Dragon Age II (2011)
- Voiced by: Brian Bloom

In-universe information
- Race: Dwarf
- Home: Kirkwall
- Class: Rogue
- Specialization: Marksman (Dragon Age II); Artificer (Inquisition)

Varric Tethras is a fictional character from BioWare's Dragon Age franchise. The character made his debut in 2011's Dragon Age II, where he appeared as part of the game's framing device as the unreliable narrator of its plot. He also serves as a party member, a role which he reprises in its sequel, Dragon Age: Inquisition. In-universe, he is a renowned novelist as well as a self-appointed biographer to Hawke and the Inquisitor, the protagonists of Dragon Age II and Dragon Age: Inquisition respectively. In Dragon Age: The Veilguard, Varric reprises his role as narrator while also acting as the mentor for Rook whom he'd recruited to help him stop Solas from destroying the Veil. Brian Bloom provides the voice for Varric in all media.

Varric has consistently received a positive reception since his debut, with attention drawn to his sense of humour, loyalty, and wisecracking personality. The character's popularity have led BioWare to turn his most notable in-universe work, Hard in Hightown, into a real-world publication. Varric is listed as the first author; the actual novel is written by Mary Kirby, a former BioWare employee who was one of the main writers of the Dragon Age franchise.

== Character overview ==
Varric is a dwarf from House Tethras, a dwarven noble house which was exiled in disgrace to the surface world from their subterranean homeland, the kingdom of Orzammar, generations prior to the events of Dragon Age II. He is depicted as wielding considerable de facto political power by virtue of economic assets derived from his family's involvement in trade and commerce. He is considered a merchant prince among the surface dwarves of Thedas, the setting in which the Dragon Age franchise take place, and has a reputation for being the best dressed man in Kirkwall's Lowtown.

Varric claims he runs a "spy network" with contacts to deal with various troubles that come along with being in a family that is part of the Dwarven Merchants Guild, although he has little interest in their agenda and schemes; he maintains an outward facade as the idle younger scion of his family; while his older brother is in charge of the family business, he usually spends his time in taverns spinning wild stories to the local gamblers and thieves while people buy him drinks. On occasion, his storytelling act is also a cover of him to rob his audience blind. Varric is also an accomplished author renowned throughout Thedas; his most notable work is Hard in Hightown, which features the clash between a secretive group of agents of the Chantry's leader Divine with a mysterious organization known as the Executors over a mysterious artifact, with a member of the Kirkwall City Guard, Donnen Brennokovic, caught between the fronts.

Varric is the only companion member to be a permanent fixture in both Dragon Age II and Dragon Age: Inquisition; the player will never encounter crisis points with Varric or risk him leaving the party due to his central role in the games' storylines. His loyalty to the player characters of both games is noted by Mike Darrah as a defining character trait. His signature weapon is a repeating crossbow he named Bianca. Bianca has a carved wood stock and brass embellishments, as well as a retractable bayonet that slides out of a slot in the front. As such, Varric is the only companion who cannot equip alternative ranged weapons in the Dragon Age series besides his crossbow, which could be upgraded throughout the course of the games. Whenever he is asked about the story behind how Bianca got her name, he replies that it involves a girl and a promise, and that it is the one story that he can never tell.

In Dragon Age II, Varric is depicted as constantly spinning exaggerated stories about Hawke's heroic deeds. Solving problems and gaining an advantage through diplomacy, lying, and blackmail impresses him, whereas he finds straightforward violence and outright thuggery to be distasteful. He also responds well to irreverent humor and sarcasm. The events of Dragon Age II evoke his compassion and selflessness, revealing Varric to be a goodhearted person who appreciates kind and thoughtful acts, and who is determined to rebuild Kirkwall after being elected as Viscount following his adventures in Inquisition.

== Conception and creation ==
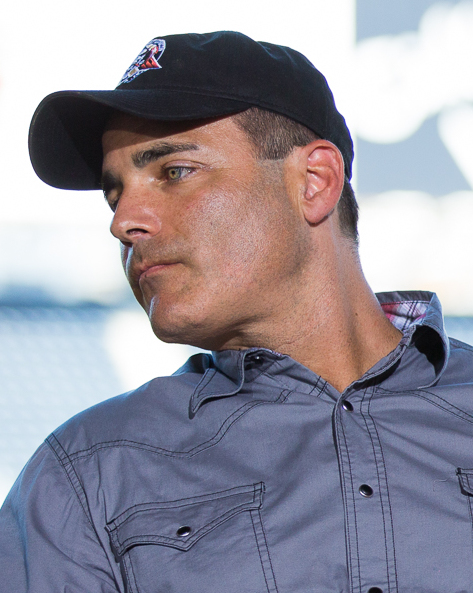
Brian Bloom, the voice of Varric

Varric was originally written as a sleazy and untrustworthy character, one who "knows a good shirt can sell a story, and the right clothes are every bit as valuable as coin". The development team later decided that given all the opposing personalities in the party, a companion who would stand up for the protagonist of Dragon Age II was necessary, and Varric was eased into that role. In order to find Varric's voice, Bloom would metaphorically "gargle glass and scotch and sharks' teeth". Though he is not a romance option in either installment of the series, he can be flirted with in dialogue conversations. Mary Kirby wrote Varric in both games.

Varric's character design is noted as a departure from the usual sword and sorcery dwarf archetype, being "clean-shaven, bare-chested, playfully roguish and broadly disinterested in the usual Dwarven concerns of mining and industry". His dress style is described as "a subtle snub to tradition, foregoing the typical beard while making light of ostentatious merchant families".

== Fictional appearances ==
=== In Dragon Age II ===
Varric first meets Hawke a year after their arrival in Kirkwall. Varric's brother, Bartrand, rejects Hawke's request to join his expedition into the Deep Roads. The future Champion is pick-pocketed by a thief whom Varric shoots and pins to a wall using Bianca. Returning Hawke's money, Varric, having heard of Hawke's reputation for skill, competence and reliability, offers them a place on the excavation as an investor. Tagging along to help Hawke gain the necessary money, Varric requests that Hawke speak to him privately in the Hanged Man in Lowtown later. At the Hanged Man, Varric tells Hawke the excavation lacks a suitable route to the Deep Roads and requests Hawke get one from a Grey Warden Varric has found in the city. Varric later accompanies both Bartrand and Hawke in The Deep Roads Expedition. They encounter a Primeval Thaig with an idol made from the dangerous mineral lyrium within. Bartrand, enamored by the idol, locks both Hawke and Varric in the room where the idol was found and makes off with idol, leaving the other two for dead. Varric is livid over this betrayal and swears to find and kill Bartrand.

Hawke and Varric manage to escape the Deep Roads and the treasures they found in their expedition make the two of them extremely wealthy. Bartrand vanishes after the Deep Roads expedition, and Varric has to divert his attention from searching for his wayward brother to keeping the now-abandoned family business from falling apart. Varric then occupies his missing brother's seat in the Dwarven Merchants' Guild, though he rarely attends Guild meetings and is hardly ever seen actually occupying the chair in their hall that belongs to House Tethras. He prefers to run the Tethras financial empire from his suite at the Hanged Man Tavern.

Eventually, Varric's spy network discovers Bartrand has returned to Kirkwall and is staying in a mansion in Hightown. Varric enlists Hawke's aid in paying Bartrand a visit, starting the quest Family Matter. Yet when they arrive at the mansion, Varric discovers that Bartrand's guards have turned crazed and hostile. After plowing through all the enemies, Hawke and Varric discover Hugin, the last surviving servant of the household. He reveals that after Bartrand left Varric and Hawke to die in the abandoned thaig, he started hearing voices, claiming the lyrium idol was 'singing' to him. Even after selling it, Bartrand can still hear the idol and is eventually driven mad by it. He tortures the servants by cutting pieces off them to help them 'hear the song'. Bartrand also feeds the guards lyrium, which makes them go insane. Hugin begs Varric and Hawke to give a quick and merciful death to anything still alive in Bartrand's study. Varric and Hawke's party proceed to fight off Bartrand and his remaining crazed guards. Once Bartrand is defeated, Varric tries to talk to him, but it becomes clear that Bartrand is crazy – he recognizes his brother and requests he help him find the idol again before talking to someone or something in his head. Varric could be persuaded to kill Bartrand, or spare him as his descent into madness is punishment enough.

When the conflict between Kirkwall's mage and templar organisations comes to a head following the destruction of the Kirkwall Chantry by one of Hawke's companions, the rebel mage Anders, Varric will side with Hawke regardless of which faction the player chooses to support. Varric leaves Kirkwall with Hawke at the end of the game; however, he later returned. Cassandra Pentaghast, a Seeker of the Chantry, travels there to interrogate him on the Chantry's behalf, believing that Hawke is the only hope of stopping the war between the mages and the Chantry. He tells her the Champion's story in full, though he exaggerates on some details. At the end of the interrogation, Varric informs Cassandra that he does not know where Hawke is, though he very much doubts that the Champion is dead. Cassandra thanks him and allows him to leave.

He later wrote and published a book called The Tale of the Champion, about the rise of his close friend Hawke and their involvement in the Kirkwall Rebellion.

=== In Dragon Age: Inquisition ===
Varric is brought to the Temple of Sacred Ashes, located near a town called Haven, by Cassandra to provide the Chantry with information on Hawke. An explosion at the temple is triggered by an entity known as the Elder One and his agents, which creates a massive portal in the sky known as the Breach, allowing multitudes of demons to escape from an otherworldly realm called the Fade into the mortal world. The explosion kills thousands, with the sole survivor being the player protagonist. Varric decides to remain to assist the Chantry forces. He later joins the Inquisition along with the protagonist, who is hailed as the Herald of Andraste due to their newfound power to banish demons as well as close the Breach and any similar portals of smaller size known as Fade Rifts.

After the Elder One's subsequent attack on Haven forces the Inquisition to move to a fortress known as Skyhold, Varric informs the Herald of Andraste, now known as the Inquisitor, that he knows someone who might be able to help. This contact is none other than Hawke. Cassandra, who is angry that he lied to her about not knowing Hawke's whereabouts, confronts Varric about his duplicity; the player may choose to intervene.

The Inquisitor may eventually encounter a dwarven woman talking to Varric at Skyhold, discussing a possible lead on Corypheus's source of red lyrium. Eventually revealed as his on-and-off love interest, Bianca Davri, she informs the Inquisitor that the location of Bartrand's Folly has been leaked, and that there are humans carting red lyrium out by the handful though the Valammar entrance. Varric discloses that her knowledge of the thaig came from him; he sent her letters after the Deep Roads Expedition.

The Inquisitor joins the duo on a mission to seal off the entrance in Valammar. At the end of the mission, the Inquisitor or Varric will come to the conclusion that it was Bianca who leaked the location of the thaig, which will result in a confrontation between the three. She reveals that she went into the ruins herself to study the red lyrium after receiving Varric's letter. If Bartrand was kept alive during the events of Dragon Age II, she will mention him as one of the reasons for going into the ruins, saying she was doing him a favour. If Varric was allowed to keep the fragment of the lyrium idol, that can also be used as a justification as she says that she was trying to help him study it. According to her research, red lyrium is corrupted with the Blight. This proves lyrium to be alive, as the Blight can only taint living things. This research led to her indirectly introducing the Elder One to red lyrium, whom she met while seeking a Grey Warden Mage.

Two years after the Inquisition's defeat of the Elder One, Varric is elected as the new Viscount of Kirkwall. If his approval is high, he can make the Inquisitor a Comte/Comtess. Varric has been funding numerous reconstruction projects in Kirkwall, and when he publicly complained that the lack of a ruling viscount was interfering with his reconstruction operations, the city state's nobility foisted the crown on Varric since they thought his complaining was "volunteering". The nobles feared the responsibility of running the city state, considering the fates of their past leaders, but could not leave the throne vacant out of concern that it could facilitate a foreign invasion. Under his rule, Kirkwall finally resumed its place as the major trade hub in the Free Marches. He also wrote a book about the Inquisition called All This Shit Is Weird, from which Cassandra reads excerpts out loud during the credits of the Trespasser DLC.

=== In Dragon Age: The Veilguard ===
Veilguard begins in medias res with the player protagonist Rook having been previously recruited by Varric to pursue and stop Solas from destroying the Veil – during the opening sequence events, Rook along with Varric and Harding have traced Solas to the Tevinter capital city of Minrathous. They then locate Solas in the forest of Arlathan, capital of the ancient elven empire, in the midst of a ritual to destroy the Veil. Rook can either support or discourage Varric in his plan to attempt to talk Solas down as Solas' friend. Regardless, Varric is stabbed while scuffling with Solas and Rook disrupts the ritual. The disruption releases two ancient elven gods tied to the Veil – Elgar'nan and Ghilan'nain. Solas is imprisoned within the Fade and bound to Rook via a blood connection made during the ritual; Rook learns that Elgar'nan and Ghilan'nain plan to harness the Blight out of revenge for Solas imprisoning them within the Veil. The protagonist and their companions take up residence within the "Lighthouse", Solas' former base of operations within the Fade. Varric appears to be severely injured and spends most of the game in the Lighthouse's infirmary advising Rook from his sick bed as Rook sets out to stop Elgar'nan and Ghilan'nain. Varric also serves as the game's narrator.

After Ghilan'nain is killed, Solas betrays Rook and entraps them within the Fade prison. Rook subsequently discovers that Solas had used blood magic to alter Rook's memory of the ritual in order to trick them into believing Varric was still alive after Solas had killed him in their scuffle. Since then, every conversation between Rook and Varric had actually been in Rook's mind. During the Fade prison escape, Rook faces the true memory of Varric's death and says goodbye.

=== Other appearances ===
==== Comics ====
Varric has appeared in a series of spin-off digital comics set in the Dragon Age universe. He appears as the central character of Dragon Age: Until We Sleep, and as a supporting character in Dragon Age: The Silent Grove, Dragon Age: Those Who Speak, and Dragon Age: Knight Errant.

==== Dragon Age: Hard in Hightown ====
Dragon Age: Hard in Hightown is a fictional crime thriller novel by Mary Kirby using Varric Tethras as her pen name, released on July 31, 2018. A female version of Hawke is depicted on the cover, and several characters from Dragon Age II, including Hawke's companions, are portrayed in the story though their names are altered; some are cameo appearances, while others are major characters in the narrative. As it is based on Varric's in-universe work, the novel features the character Donnen Brennokovic as its protagonist.

Kirby explained in an interview that Hard in Hightown was conceived as a side project during the development of Inquisition, where the staff would set aside one week every few months to work on creative projects that were related to the Dragon Age franchise but might not be included as in-game content for Inquisition. Hard in Hightown serves as flavor text in the form of in-game codex entries, which are set at a maximum word limit of 500 words. Kirby noted that then-Creative Director Mike Laidlaw offered her the opportunity to flesh out and publish Hard in Hightown as a novel following the conclusion of the development cycle for Inquisition downloadable content. Kirby originally envisioned Hard in Hightown as a parody of the buddy cop film genre, but later wrote it as a "hardboiled detective story" as she felt that film noir would better fit Varric's voice. The title of the book references the movie series Die Hard, whereas other elements within the book's narrative references the Lethal Weapon franchise. Kirby described Hard in Hightown as a mystery crime novel with "more swords", and that the plot is inspired by a combination of buddy cop films from the 1980s and the works of Dashiell Hammett, in particular The Maltese Falcon. She also noted that there are "a lot of dry dwarven observations about Kirkwall society and snide comments about the Merchants’ Guild" in the story.

BioWare uploaded a video of Brian Bloom reading an excerpt from Hard in Hightown on their official YouTube channel to promote the novel.

== Critical reception ==
Varric has received mostly positive reactions from video game journalists, and is considered to be one of BioWare's best characters. Kimberley Wallace of Game Informer said Varric "may have a thing for blackmail and you never can be sure he's actually telling the truth, but like a true sidekick, he never lets you down. He'll always be there with a drink in hand and a crazy story to lighten the mood." Alluding to Varric's in-game reputation as a best-selling author in addition to being a "kick-ass crossbow rogue", Ray Ivey of Just Adventure notes that Varric's character arc in Dragon Age: Inquisition "leads into several interesting directions, including plagiarism, spies using faked versions of his works to send nefarious messages and, hilariously, a reveal that one of the other party members (the stern Cassandra) is an almost obsessive fan of his romance serials". Samuel Roberts from PC Gamer named Varric as his personal favorite Bioware companion, commenting "Varric wins out for me because he's the closest your main character gets to an actual best buddy in a BioWare title (other than maybe Garrus in Mass Effect)."

Within the Dragon Age series, Varric is one of the most popular characters, with various sources describing him as a fan favorite. The results of a match-up poll of Dragon Age characters hosted by Bioware as part of a March Madness theme in March 2015 revealed that fans voted the Dragon Age: Origins Warden protagonist, Alistair, Varric, and Morrigan as preferred party leader, warrior, rogue and mage in an ideal party respectively. Varric's abundant chest hair, a signature physical cue of the character, and his perceived sex appeal has become a running gag both in-universe and with Dragon Age fandom.

In response to the announcement that Hard in Hightown was being published as a real-life novel, Ethan Grach from Kotaku felt that it was "an odd time" for the publication of a Dragon Age book, noting the meta-referential nature of the novel and that Varric's "writerly success is more of a punchline than anything else as evidenced by the title". He opined that the text-based War Table mission involving Varric's in-universe work was "one of the more memorable missions you get to direct from a BioWare menu system and yet probably not the kind lore Dragon Age fans are most curious to see expanded upon while they wait to hear about what’s next for the series."
