= List of Dragon Age media =

Franchise of video games and media

Dragon Age is a fantasy media franchise created by Canadian writer David Gaider and video game developer BioWare, and owned and published by Electronic Arts. Central to the Dragon Age franchise are the main series of multi-platform role-playing video games: Dragon Age: Origins, Dragon Age II, Dragon Age: Inquisition, and Dragon Age: The Veilguard. Each game features a different protagonist and plot, but is linked by a common setting, the fictional world of Thedas, as well as several recurring elements and supporting characters. The Dragon Age franchise also includes spin-off games, each with a different gameplay style: two flash games developed by EA2D; a mobile collectible card game developed by EA Capital Games; and a resource management browser game developed by Failbetter Games.

The Dragon Age video games have been influential and successful; the release of the first main series game in 2009 was credited for contributing towards a resurgence in popularity for western role-playing video games and inspiring imitators, while Inquisition won multiple Game of The Year awards and is the most successful video game launch in BioWare history based on units sold. Besides video games, this list covers associated media produced or endorsed by BioWare, or the intellectual property owner Electronic Arts, which includes novelizations, comics, tabletop role playing adaptation source material, an anime film, soundtrack albums, and other media.

== Video games ==
=== Main series ===
Game	Details
Dragon Age: Origins Original release date(s): NA: November 3, 2009; EU: November 6, 2009	Release years by system: 2009 – Microsoft Windows, Xbox 360, PlayStation 3 Mac OS X
Dragon Age: Origins Original release date(s): NA: November 3, 2009; EU: November 6, 2009	Notes: Developed by BioWare; Microsoft Windows and PlayStation 3 ports developed by Edge of Reality and Mac OS X port developed by TransGaming; Published by Electronic Arts; Additionally released as a part of the Dragon Age: Ultimate Edition compilation (2010); Expansions: "The Stone Prisoner" (2009); "Warden's Keep" (2009); "A Tale of Orzammar" (2009); "Return to Ostagar" (2010); "Awakening" (2010); "The Darkspawn Chronicles" (2010); "Leliana's Song" (2010); "The Golems of Amgarrak" (2010); "Witch Hunt" (2010)
Dragon Age II Original release date(s): NA: March 8, 2011; EU: March 10, 2011	Release years by system: 2011 – Microsoft Windows, Xbox 360, PlayStation 3, Mac OS X
Dragon Age II Original release date(s): NA: March 8, 2011; EU: March 10, 2011	Notes: Developed by BioWare and Mac OS X port developed by TransGaming; Published by Electronic Arts; Expansions: "The Exiled Prince" (2010); "Legacy" (2010); "Mark of the Assassin" (2010)
Dragon Age: Inquisition Original release date(s): NA: November 18, 2014; EU: November 21, 2014	Release years by system: 2014 – Microsoft Windows, PlayStation 3, PlayStation 4, Xbox 360,Xbox One
Dragon Age: Inquisition Original release date(s): NA: November 18, 2014; EU: November 21, 2014	Notes: Developed by BioWare; Published by Electronic Arts; Additionally released as a part of the Dragon Age: Inquisition – Game of the Year Edition compilation (2015) for Microsoft Windows, PlayStation 4, Xbox One; Expansions: "Jaws of Hakkon" (2015); "The Descent" (2015); "Trespasser" (2015)
Dragon Age: The Veilguard Original release date(s): WW: October 31, 2024	Release years by system: 2024 – Microsoft Windows, Xbox Series X/S, PlayStation 5
Dragon Age: The Veilguard Original release date(s): WW: October 31, 2024	Notes: Developed by BioWare; Published by Electronic Arts

=== Other games ===
Game	Details
Dragon Age Journeys Original release date(s): WW: October 22, 2009	Release years by system: 2009 – Web browser
Dragon Age Journeys Original release date(s): WW: October 22, 2009	Notes: Developed by EA 2-D; Published by Electronic Arts; 2-D flash game side story set in the Dragon Age universe; Tie-in game to Origins
Dragon Age Legends Original release date(s): WW: March 16, 2011	Release years by system: 2011 – Facebook and Google+
Dragon Age Legends Original release date(s): WW: March 16, 2011	Notes: Developed by EA 2-D; Published by Electronic Arts; 2-D flash based tie-in game to Dragon Age II.; Modified version with hack and slash gameplay called Dragon Age Legends: Remix 01 released in May 2011.; Re-released as a free downloadable game playable offline following server shutdown in June 2012
Heroes of Dragon Age Original release date(s): WW: December 5, 2013	Release years by system: 2013 – Android, iOS
Heroes of Dragon Age Original release date(s): WW: December 5, 2013	Notes: Developed by EA Capital Games; Published by Electronic Arts; Freemium mobile game set in the Dragon Age universe
Dragon Age: The Last Court Original release date(s): WW: November 7, 2014	Release years by system: 2014 – Web browser
Dragon Age: The Last Court Original release date(s): WW: November 7, 2014	Notes: Developed by Failbetter Games; Published by Electronic Arts; Accessed via the online application Dragon Age Keep; Story-driven, text-based digital card game set before the events of Dragon Age: Inquisition

== Printed media ==
=== Books ===
Title	Release date	ISBN	Media type	Ref.
Dragon Age: The Stolen Throne	March 3, 2009; March 1, 2010 (UK); September 25, 2018 (deluxe edition)	978-0-7653-2408-5	Novelization	
Written by David Gaider; Published by Tor Books, Titan Books, and Dark Horse (deluxe edition); A prequel story to Dragon Age: Origins
Dragon Age: The Calling	October 13, 2009 (NA); March 1, 2010 (UK); December 16, 2018 (deluxe edition)	978-0-7653-2409-2	Novelization	
Written by David Gaider; Published by Tor Books, Titan Books, and Dark Horse (deluxe edition); A story set between Dragon Age: The Stolen Throne and Dragon Age: Origins – Awakening
Dragon Age: Asunder	December 20, 2011 (NA); December 23, 2011 (UK); March 19, 2019 (deluxe edition)	978-0-85768-647-3	Novelization	
Written by David Gaider; Published by Tor Books, Titan Books, and Dark Horse (deluxe edition); A story set between Dragon Age II and Dragon Age: Inquisition
Dragon Age: The World of Thedas Volume I	April 30, 2013	978-1-61655-115-5	Concept art and guidebook	
Written by Ben Gelinas (project lead), David Gaider, Mike Laidlaw, and various contributors; Published by Dark Horse; Concept art and background lore on the Dragon Age setting
Dragon Age: The Masked Empire	April 8, 2014 (NA); April 11, 2014 (UK); June 18, 2019 (deluxe edition)	978-0-7653-3118-2	Tie-in book to Dragon Age: Inquisition	
Written by Patrick Weekes; Published by Tor Books, Titan Books, and Dark Horse (deluxe edition); A prequel story to Dragon Age: Inquisition
Dragon Age: Last Flight	September 16, 2014; September 17, 2019 (deluxe edition)	978-0-7653-3721-4	Novelization	
Written by Liane Merciel; Published by Tor Books, Titan Books, and Dark Horse (deluxe edition); A side story set in the Dragon Age universe
The Art of Dragon Age: Inquisition	November 18, 2014	978-1-61655-186-5	Art book	
Written by BioWare; Published by Dark Horse; Concept art and BioWare commentary on Dragon Age: Inquisition
Dragon Age: The World of Thedas Volume II	May 12, 2015	978-1-61655-501-6	Concept art and guidebook	
Written by Ben Gelinas (project lead), Nick Thornborrow (project lead - art), and various contributors; Published by Dark Horse; Concept art and background lore on the Dragon Age setting
Dragon Age: The Poster Collection	September 28, 2016	978-1-5067-0117-2	Concept art	
Artwork by BioWare; Published by Dark Horse Comics; Concept art, with each page detachable for use as a poster
Dragon Age Adult Coloring Book	February 8, 2017	978-1-5067-0283-4	Coloring book	
Artwork by Juann Cabal, Ron Chan, Gabriel Guzman, Andres Ponce, and Martin Tunica; Published by Dark Horse Comics; Adult coloring book, including images from the Dragon Age main series games
Dragon Age: Hard in Hightown	July 31, 2018	978-1-5067-0404-3	Novelization	
Written by Mary Kirby as Varric Tethras; Published by Dark Horse; Spin-off side story from Dragon Age II
Dragon Age: Tevinter Nights	March 10, 2020	978-0-7653-3722-1	Anthology	
Edited by Chris Bain, Patrick Weekes, Matthew Goldman, Christopher Morgan; Published by Tor Books; An anthology of short stories set in the Dragon Age universe

=== Comics ===
Title	Release date(s)	Media type	Ref
Dragon Age Origins	September — October 2009	Webcomic	
Published by Penny Arcade for free online; An eight-page mini-comic set before Dragon Age: Origins starring Morrigan and Flemeth
Dragon Age Origins Awakening	February — March 2010	Webcomic	
Published by Penny Arcade for free online; A six-page mini-comic set before Dragon Age: Origins – Awakening starring Nathaniel Howe
Dragon Age: The Revelation	March 1, 2010	Webcomic	
Written by David Gaider, with art by Irma "Aimo" Ahmed; Published on the official BioWare blog; An eight-page mini-comic based on cut content for Dragon Age: Origins, featuring Alistair and Morrigan
Dragon Age	March 31, 2010 — December 8, 2010	Comic book series	
Written by Orson Scott Card, Aaron Johnston, Mark Robinson, and Anthony J. Tan, with art by Humberto Ramos and Mark Robinson; Published by IDW Publishing; A six-part mini-series side story set in the Dragon Age universe; Released as a single book by IDW Publishing on March 16, 2011 (ISBN 978-1-60010-774-0)
Dragon Age 2	March 2011	Webcomic	
Published by BioWare on the official Dragon Age II website; A three-page mini-comic by Penny Arcade featuring Hawke and Isabela
Hindsight	March 9, 2011	Webcomic	
Published by BioWare on the official Dragon Age II website; A motion comic by Penny Arcade about an in-game item named "Hindsight"
Dragon Age: The Silent Grove	February 22, 2012 — May 2, 2012	Comic book series	
Written by David Gaider, script by Alexander Freed, art by Chad Hardin; Published by Dark Horse Comics; A six-part mini-series set after Dragon Age II featuring Alistair, Varric Tethras and Isabela; Released as a single book by Dark Horse Comics on July 25, 2012 (ISBN 978-1-59582-916-0)
Dragon Age: Those Who Speak	August 22, 2012—November 14, 2012	Comic book series	
Written by David Gaider, script by Alexander Freed, art by Chad Hardin; Published by Dark Horse Comics; A three-part mini-series sequel story to Dragon Age: The Silent Grove; Released as a single book by Dark Horse Comics on July 25, 2012 (ISBN 978-1-61655-053-0)
Dragon Age: Until We Sleep	March 27, 2013 — May 29, 2013	Comic book series	
Written by David Gaider, script by Alexander Freed, art by Chad Hardin; Published by Dark Horse Comics; A three-part mini-series sequel story to Dragon Age: Those Who Speak; Released as a single book by Dark Horse Comics on August 21, 2013 (ISBN 978-1-61655-219-0)
Dragon Age Library Edition Volume 1	June 4, 2014	Anthology	
Written by David Gaider, script by Alexander Freed, art by Chad Hardin and Anthony Palumbo; Published by Dark Horse Comics (ISBN 978-1-61655-384-5); An anthology collection of The Silent Grove, Those Who Speak, and Until We Sleep; Republished as Dragon Age Omnibus Volume 1 on November 16, 2016 (ISBN 978-1-5067-0275-9)
Dragon Age: Magekiller	December 16, 2015 — April 20, 2016	Comic book series	
Written by Greg Rucka, art by Carmen Carnero and Sachin Teng; Published by Dark Horse Comics; A five-part mini-series running parallel to Dragon Age: Inquisition, featuring Marius and Tessa Forsythia; Released as a single book by Dark Horse Comics on August 9, 2016 (ISBN 978-1-61655-634-1)
Dragon Age: Knight Errant	May 10, 2017 — September 13, 2017	Mini-comic	
Written by Nunzio DeFilippis and Christina Weir, art by Fernando Heinz Furukawa, Sachin Teng, and Michael Atiyeh; Published by Dark Horse Comics; A five-part mini-series sequel story to Dragon Age: Magekiller, featuring Vaea and Ser Aaron Hawthorne; Released as a single book by Dark Horse Comics on January 16, 2018 (ISBN 978-1-5067-0338-1)
Dragon Age Library Edition Volume 2	October 16, 2018	Anthology	
Written by Greg Rucka, Nunzio DeFilippis and Christina Weir; Art by Carmen Carnero, Fernando Heinz Furukawa, Terry Pallot, and Sachin Teng; Published by Dark Horse Comics (ISBN 978-1-5067-0660-3); An anthology collection of Magekiller and Knight-Errant
Dragon Age: Deception	October 17, 2018 — December 12, 2018	Mini-comic	
Written by Nunzio DeFilippis and Christina Weir, art by Fernando Heinz Furukawa, Sachin Teng, and Michael Atiyeh; Published by Dark Horse Comics; A three-part mini-series sequel story to Knight Errant, and features con artists Olivia Pryde and Calix; Released as a single book by Dark Horse Comics on March 27, 2019 (ISBN 978-1-5067-0745-7)
Dragon Age: Blue Wraith	January 15, 2020 — March 18, 2020	Comic book series	
Written by Nunzio DeFilippis and Christina Weir, art by Fernando Heinz Furukawa, Sachin Teng, and Michael Atiyeh; Published by Dark Horse Comics; A three-part mini-series sequel story to Deception, featuring an ensemble cast of returning characters from Magekiller, Knight Errant, Deception and Fenris from Dragon Age II; Limited edition of first issue includes variant comic art by Matt Taylor and a giclée fine art print bundle; Released as a single book by Dark Horse Comics on August 19, 2020 (ISBN 978-1-5067-0827-0)
Dragon Age: The First Five Graphic Novels	October 27, 2020	Anthology	
Written by David Gaider, Alexander Freed, Greg Rucka, Nunzio DeFilippis and Christina Weir; Art by Chad Hardin, Anthony Palumbo, Carmen Carnero, Fernando Heinz Furukawa, Terry Pallot, and Sachin Teng; Published by Dark Horse Comics (ISBN 978-1-5067-1917-7); An anthology collection of trade paperback graphic novels collected in Volumes 1 and 2 of Dragon Age Library Edition; Includes The Silent Grove, Those Who Speak, Until We Sleep, Magekiller, and Knight-Errant
Dragon Age: Dark Fortress	March 31, 2021 — May 26, 2021	Comic book series	
Written by Nunzio DeFilippis and Christina Weir, art by Fernando Heinz Furukawa, Sachin Teng, and Michael Atiyeh; Published by Dark Horse Comics; A three-part mini-series sequel story to Blue Wraith, featuring an ensemble cast of returning characters from Magekiller, Knight Errant, Deception and Blue Wraith; Released as a single book by Dark Horse Comics on October 20, 2021 (ISBN 978-1-5067-0828-7)
Dragon Age: Wraiths of Tevinter	August 24, 2022	Anthology	
Written by Nunzio DeFilippis and Christina Weir, art by Fernando Heinz Furukawa, Sachin Teng, and Michael Atiyeh; Published by Dark Horse Comics (ISBN 978-1-5067-0829-4); An anthology collection of Deception, Blue Wraith, and Dark Fortress.
Dragon Age: The Missing	January 25, 2023 — May 10, 2023	Comic book series	
Written by George Mann, art by Fernando Heinz Furukawa, Kieran McKeown, Tomás Aira, and Álvaro Sarraseca; Published by Dark Horse Comics; A four-part mini-series leading directly into Dragon Age: The Veilguard, the fourth video game in the series; Released as a single book by Dark Horse Comics on October 4, 2023 (ISBN 978-1-5067-3280-0)

=== Tabletop role-playing game ===
Title	Release date	ISBN	Media type	Ref.
Dragon Age RPG, Set 1	January 25, 2010	978-1-934547-30-4	Box Set	
Written and designed by Chris Pramas; Published by Green Ronin; Includes two introductory-level rulebooks and three six-sided dice
Dragon Age RPG, Set 2	September 20, 2011	978-1-934547-44-1	Box Set	
Written and designed by Chris Pramas; Published by Green Ronin; Includes two rulebooks and a full-color poster-sized map of the world of Thedas
Dragon Age RPG, Set 3	January 30, 2012	978-1-934547-48-9	Box Set	
Written and designed by Chris Pramas; Published by Green Ronin; Includes two rulebooks
Dragon Age RPG Core Rulebook	June 20, 2017	978-1-934547-62-5	Book of rules	
Written by Chris Pramas; Published by Green Ronin; Collects all three previously released box sets into one hardcover book; The limited edition features a slipcase with a red leatherette bound book, silver foil stamped, with silver-gilded edges and a ribbon bookmark
Faces of Thedas: A Dragon Age RPG Sourcebook	April 9, 2019	978-1-934547-83-0	Book of rules	
Written by Lisa Adams, Stephen Michael Dipesa, Justin Harris, Alyc Helms, Jack Norris, Matt Miller, Oz Mills, Ryan Schoon, Jamie Wood; Published by Green Ronin; A supplemental non-player character cast book featuring adaptations of characters from the Dragon Age video games

== Film and television ==
Title	Release date	Media type	Ref.
Dragon Age: Dawn of the Seeker	February 11, 2012	Anime film	
Written by Jeffrey Scott and directed by Fumihiko Sori; Animated by Oxybot; Produced by BioWare, Funimation, and T.O Entertainment; Animated film set before Dragon Age: Origins; Japanese version was released in select movie theaters on February 11, 2012, while the English version was released on Blu-ray and DVD on May 29, 2012.
Dragon Age: Absolution	December 2022	Animated streaming series	
Created by Mairghread Scott; Produced by Red Dog Culture House

== Soundtracks ==
Title	Release date	Release type	Ref.
Dragon Age: Origins Official Soundtrack	November 3, 2009	Album	
Composed by Inon Zur and Aubrey Ashburn; Published by Electronic Arts; 35 tracks on a single disc with a duration of 1:02:33; Released digitally on Amazon.com on December 8, 2009
Dragon Age: Origins Collector's Edition Soundtrack Album	November 3, 2009	Album	
Composed by Inon Zur and Aubrey Ashburn; Published by Electronic Arts; Included with all copies of the Collector's Edition of Dragon Age: Origins; 18 tracks on a single disc with a duration of 36:18
Dragon Age: Origins - Leliana's Song (Original Video Game Score)	October 25, 2010	Album (digital only)	
Composed by Inon Zur and Aubrey Ashburn; Published by Electronic Arts; 8 tracks on a single disc with a duration of 12:22
Dragon Age II	March 8, 2011	Album	
Composed by Inon Zur; Published by Electronic Arts; 12 tracks on a single disc with a duration of 12:22
Dragon Age II - Bioware Signature Edition	March 8, 2011	Album	
Composed by Inon Zur; Published by Electronic Arts; 29 tracks on a single disc with a duration of 10:21
Dragon Age II: The Darker Side	April 6, 2010	Album	
Composed by Inon Zur; Published by Inon Zur and Electronic Arts; 10 tracks on a single disc with a duration of 10:21
Dragon Age II: Epic Times	June 7, 2010	Album	
Composed by Inon Zur; Published by Inon Zur and Electronic Arts; 11 tracks on a single disc with a duration of 10:21
Dragon Age: Dawn of the Seeker (Music Inspired By the Film)	May 20, 2012	Mini-album (digital only)	
Features track recordings by Seether & Roger Sanche, Shanice, and The Drug & Kevin "KD" Davis; Published by Funimusic; 3 tracks on a single disc with a duration of 10:58
Dragon Age: Inquisition (Original Game Soundtrack)	November 17, 2014	Album	
Composed by Trevor Morris; Published by Electronic Arts; 39 tracks on a single disc with a duration of 1:36:46
Dragon Age Inquisition: The Bard Songs	February 17, 2015	Album (digital only)	
Composed by Raney Shockne, and features the voice of Elizaveta Khripounova and the guitar playing of Nick Stoubis; Includes "I Am the One", which was originally composed by Inon Zur; Published by Electronic Arts; 10 tracks on a single disc with a duration of 19:36
Dragon Age Inquisition: The Descent / Trespasser	November 13, 2015	Album	
Composed by Trevor Morris; Published by Electronic Arts; 10 tracks on a single disc with a duration of 25:57
Dragon Age Inquisition: Songs of the Exalted Council	January 8, 2016	Mini-album (digital only)	
Composed by Raney Shockne, and features the voice of Elizaveta Khripounova and the guitar playing of Nick Stoubis; Published by Electronic Arts; 5 tracks on a single disc with a duration of 13:09

== Other media ==
Title	Release date	Media type
Dragon Age: Warden's Fall	May 22, 2010	Web series
Five-part animated series designed by Machinima on the Dragon Age: Origins toolset in partnership with BioWare; A tie-in prequel story to Dragon Age: Origins – Awakening
Dragon Age: Redemption	October 10, 2011	Web series
Created, written and co-produced by Felicia Day; Directed by Peter Winther; Six-part live action series tie-in for Dragon Age II: Mark of the Assassin
Dragon Age Keep	October 29, 2014	Application
Enables players to tailor notable decisions from Dragon Age: Origins and Dragon Age II, and import them into a new game of Dragon Age: Inquisition; Accessible on web browsers and through the digital distribution platform Origin for mobile devices
Paper & Steel	April 30, 2015	Short story
Written by Joanna Berry; Published on the official BioWare blog; A story featuring the Red Templar leader Samson
Paying the Ferryman	June 2, 2015	Short story
Written by Joanna Berry; Published on the official BioWare blog; A story featuring the Venatori leader Calpernia
The Riddle of Truth	September 17, 2015	Short story
Written by Joanna Berry; Published on the official BioWare blog; A story written in second person about Orlesian politics and social etiquette
