= Dragon Age: Tevinter Nights =

2020 anthology of short stories

- Cover of Dragon Age: Tevinter Nights
- Editor: Chris Bain; Patrick Weekes; Matthew Goldman; Christopher Morgan
- Cover artist: Ramil Sunga (cover)
- Language: English
- Series: Dragon Age
- Genre: Fantasy
- Publisher: Tor Books; Titan Books
- Publication date: March 10, 2020
- Publication place: Canada/United States
- Media type: Print (Paperback); Digital (E-Book)
- Pages: 494 (Tor Books); 512 (Titan Books)
- ISBN: 978-0-7653-3722-1

Dragon Age: Tevinter Nights is an anthology of short stories set in Thedas, the universe of the Dragon Age media franchise. The collection is edited by Chris Bain, Trick Weekes, Matthew Goldman and Christopher Morgan, and comprises a selection of fifteen stories written by nine BioWare staff writers about various characters from the Dragon Age series. Tevinter Nights was released on March 10, 2020 in paperback and e-book format.

== Overview ==
Tevinter Nights contains a fold out color map of the world of Thedas in the front. The book's title has led to speculation by some commentators that the fourth mainline Dragon Age video game will take place in the Tevinter Imperium, a human nation in northern Thedas governed by an oligarchy of magic-wielding magisters. In spite of its title, some of Tevinter Night's stories are set in a variety of locations besides the Tevinter Imperium, and features non-Tevinter organizations such as the Antivan Crows, the Mortalitasi necromancers of the kingdom of Nevarra, the Grey Warden Order headquartered at Weisshaupt Fortress in the Anderfels, and the nomadic Dalish elven clans.

The story collection is not organized in chronological order; instead of a single linear storyline, Tevinter Nights follows different points in time and alternative perspectives of events to build out the lore of the Dragon Age franchise. While many of the stories focus on life in Thedas after the events of the Dragon Age: Inquisition DLC pack Trespasser, other stories explore the demons from the metaphysical realm known as the Fade or the Darkspawn menace. Major events such as the Qunari invasion depicted in Dragon Age: Inquisition - Trespasser and the defection of Solas from the Inquisition organization, as well as parts of Thedas which were only mentioned in the games, were also explored in some stories.

== Contents ==
- "Three Trees to Midnight" (Trick Weekes)
- "Down Among the Dead Men" (Sylvia Feketekuty)
- "The Horror of Hormak" (John Epler)
- "Callback" (Lukas Kristjanson)
- "Luck in the Gardens" (Sylvia Feketekuty)
- "Hunger" (Brianne Battye)
- "Murder by Death Mages" (Caitlin Sullivan Kelly)
- "The Streets of Minrathous" (Brianne Battye)
- "The Wigmaker" (Courtney Woods)
- "Genitivi Dies in the End" (Lukas Kristjanson)
- "Herold Had the Plan" (Ryan Cormier)
- "An Old Crow's Old Tricks" (Arone Le Bray)
- "Eight Little Talons" (Courtney Woods)
- "Half Up Front" (John Epler)
- "Dread Wolf Take You" (Trick Weekes)

== Reception ==
Tevinter Nights was mostly positively received. The anthology was praised for its characters, particularly when returning characters of the series made appearances, with Sarah Deeming from The British Fantasy Society saying that Tevinter Nights stays true to what appealed to her most about the main series video games, namely character development, as well as the "interactions between the characters that revealed the history of Thedas in what was said and done, as well as the hard choices the characters had to make", often fraught with the biases and assumptions seen in the games. Writing for Fanbyte, Kenneth Shepard noted that both of the stories that stood out to him, “Luck in the Gardens” by Sylvia Feketukty and “Dread Wolf Take You” by Patrick Weekes, focused on established characters returning from Inquisition, and Shepard said these stories are the ones that "don’t elect to hand stories from one person to another", and instead focuses on characters who "come with a bit of personal investment" from series fans. Natalie Flores of RPG Site noted she wished more returning characters from Inquisition or other previous entries had made appearances, and that the anthology focused on developing the world of Thedas at the expense of characters who have been established in the process. The worldbuilding of the anthology was praised, with Shepard praising it for doing "a wonderful job of expanding upon and fleshing out the world of Thedas even more," and Deeming saying that the stories reflect the "richness of the original world-building for the games". Reviewers stated the anthology would be an exciting read for fans, although it would not be "extremely accessible to newcomers".
