= Among Us Story: On Guard =

- Developer: Innersloth
- Publisher: Innersloth
- Director: Forest Willard (Note: Better known as "ForteBass")
- Designer: Carol Mertz
- Programmer: Forest Willard
- Artists: Marcus Bromander; Adriel Wallick
- Writer: Trick Weekes
- Composer: A Shell In The Pit
- Engine: Unity
- Platforms: Android; iOS; Nintendo Switch; Nintendo Switch 2; Windows
- Release: February 17, 2027
- Genre: Adventure
- Mode: Single-player

Among Us Story: On Guard is an upcoming narrative adventure game developed and published by American independent game studio Innersloth. It follows the player as a security guard who must prove their innocence by solving a murder mystery. It is scheduled to be released on February 17, 2027, for personal computers, Nintendo Switch, Nintendo Switch 2, and mobile devices. Its pre-release game demo has received positive reception.

== Plot ==
The Operator, who is working with MIRA's research and development department, is strapped into a simulator designed to train the Operator to identify impostors, which are the biggest threat to MIRA's ships. In the simulation, the Operator takes the role of a security guard, referred to simply as "the Guard", on a MIRA ship. The ship's cook has been murdered and the Guard is immediately blamed for his death. Before they are kicked out through the airlock, the lights go out and the Guard is able to escape.

The Guard starts investigating the murder, first by taking a closer look at the cook's body, which has been moved to the ship's Medbay area. The Guard then has to complete certain tasks to force other crewmates into revealing information, as well as to uncover clues, to find out who is responsible for the cook's death.

== Development ==
Following the success of Among Us, Innersloth rapidly scaled up to a team of roughly 30 full-time developers, which had to be reassigned once Among Us' popularity began to plateau. Twelve developers were assigned to Among Us Story: On Guard. Adriel Wallick, who previously worked on the 2012 game Rock Band Blitz and organizes the annual Train Jam, is the lead Unity developer of the game studio, who was tasked with creating new teams following the success of Among Us, including the team currently working on On Guard. Carol Mertz and Trick Weekes joined the company to work on the game as the lead designer and the writer, respectively. The game is directed by Forest Willard, better known as "ForteBass". Among Us Story: On Guard was announced at Summer Game Fest 2026.

== Release ==
A free demo was released as part of Steam Next Fest on June 15, 2026, as part of LudoNarraCon. The full game is scheduled to be released on February 17, 2027 for personal computers via Steam, Nintendo Switch, Nintendo Switch 2, Android, and iOS.

== Reception ==
Reviews of the demo are generally mixed to positive. Giovanni Colantonio from Polygon compared the game to The Murder of Sonic the Hedgehog—which he noted was "dropped as an April Fools' joke"—expecting the game to be "the kind of spinoff [that] can only [be] pull[ed] off once", describing the writing as "light and hokey." However, he praised the tasks and the references to the original game, calling the spinoff "a lot more charming than the series' attempt at animated TV."

Sifter's Naomi Jackson praised the vibrant colors, the art and animation, and the "new bits and pieces in each room." They noted that "each [character] has a bunch of personality that shows through instantly", finding the game "super enjoyable", though ultimately expecting that "the full experience will be quite short, even with three different endings."
