= Trick Weekes =

American author

- Education: Stanford University (BA, MA)
- Occupation: Writer
- Spouse: Karin Weekes
- Writing career
- Language: English
- Subjects: Science fiction Fantasy

Trick Weekes (also Patrick Weekes) is an American author. They were a writer at BioWare from 2005 to 2025 for the Mass Effect and Dragon Age video game franchises, becoming lead writer for Dragon Age in 2015.

== Career ==
Weekes joined BioWare in 2005, writing for both the Mass Effect and Dragon Age video game franchises. They wrote Mass Effect characters including Mordin Solus, Tali'Zorah, Jack, Kasumi Goto, and Samantha Traynor, as well as the Rannoch and Tuchanka plotlines in Mass Effect 3. For Dragon Age: Inquisition, Weekes wrote characters including Iron Bull, Solas, Krem, and Cole. They also wrote the novel Dragon Age: The Masked Empire, and edited and contributed two stories to the anthology Dragon Age: Tevinter Nights.

Following the departure of David Gaider from Dragon Age in 2015, Weekes became the lead writer for the franchise. They were lead writer for Dragon Age: The Veilguard, the franchise's next installment, and also wrote the character Taash.

After Electronic Arts' restructuring and downsizing of BioWare in January 2025, Weekes posted on Bluesky that they were no longer with BioWare. As of 2026, Weekes is working at Innersloth as a writer for Among Us Story: On Guard.

== Personal life ==
Weekes was born in the San Francisco Bay Area and attended Stanford University, graduating with a BA and an MA in English literature.

Weekes lives in Edmonton with their wife Karin Weekes; the couple has two sons. Weekes identifies as pansexual and non-binary.

== Bibliography ==
=== Games ===
- Mass Effect (2007) - writer
- Dragon Age: Origins (2009) - additional design
- Mass Effect 2 (2010) - writer
- Mass Effect 2: Lair of the Shadow Broker (2010) - writer
- Mass Effect 3 (2012) - senior writer
- Mass Effect 3: From Ashes (2012) - writer
- Mass Effect 3: Leviathan (2012) - writer
- Mass Effect 3: Citadel (2013) - writer
- Dragon Age: Inquisition (2014) - writer
- Dragon Age: Inquisition – Jaws of Hakkon (2014) - lead writer
- Dragon Age: Inquisition – Trespasser (2015) - lead writer
- Dragon Age: The Veilguard (2024) - lead writer

=== Comics ===
- Mass Effect: Homeworlds #2 (with Jeremy Barlow, Chris Staggs and Michael Atiyeh, Dark Horse, 2012)

=== Novels ===
==== Rogues of the Republic ====
- The Palace Job (2013)
- The Prophecy Con (2014)
- The Paladin Caper (2015)

==== Dragon Age ====
- Dragon Age: The Masked Empire (2014)
- Dragon Age: Tevinter Nights (2020)

==== Other ====
- Feeder (2018)

=== Short stories ===
- “Dragon Slayers” in Realms of Fantasy Issue 27 (February 1999)
- “Glass Beads” in Science Fiction Age Volume 8 Issue 4 (May 2000)
- “I Am Looking for a Book...” in Shelf Life: Fantastic Stories Celebrating Bookstores (2002, edited by Greg Ketter)
- “Why the Elders Bare Their Throats” in Strange Horizons (17 February 2003)
- “When She Grows a Soul” in The Leading Edge Issue 46 (October 2003)
- “Injure the Corners” in Amazing Stories Issue 604 (October 2004)
- “Release the Knot” in Amazing Stories Issue 606 (December 2004)
- “Unleashing the Flyers of L” in The Anthology from Hell: Humorous Stories from WAY Down Under (2012, edited by Julia S. Mandala)
