= Dragon Age: The Masked Empire =

Fantasy novel written by Patrick Weekes

- Cover of the original edition of Dragon Age: The Masked Empire
- Author: Trick Weekes
- Illustrator: Stefano Martino, Andres Ponce, German Ponce, Alvaro Sarraseca (deluxe edition)
- Language: English
- Series: Dragon Age
- Genre: Fantasy
- Publisher: Tor Books (NA); Titan Books (UK); Dark Horse Books (deluxe edition)
- Publication date: April 8, 2014 (NA); April 11, 2014 (UK); June 18, 2019 (deluxe edition)
- Publication place: Canada
- Media type: Original - Print (Paperback); Deluxe Edition - Print (Hardcover)
- Pages: 384; 344 (deluxe edition)
- ISBN: 978-1-466-83134-6
- OCLC: 1466828102

Dragon Age: The Masked Empire is a fantasy novel released on April 8, 2014, and written by Trick Weekes. The novel is set in the Empire of Orlais on the continent of Thedas, the setting for the role-playing video game franchise Dragon Age. The Masked Empire describes the events that culminate in the Orlesian civil war waged between the ruling Empress Celene I of House Valmont and her cousin, Grand Duke Gaspard de Chalons and serves as a tie-in novelization for Dragon Age: Inquisition. Besides Celene and Gaspard, other notable characters introduced in the novel who later appear in Inquisition include Celene's elven handmaiden and secret lover Briala, Celene's champion Michel de Chevin, Mihris the sole survivor of the Dalish Clan Virnehn, and the ancient demon Imshael.

A preview of the deluxe hardcover version of The Masked Empire published by Dark Horse Books, featuring three pages of prose as well as illustrations by Stefano Martino, Andres Ponce, German Ponce and Alvaro Sarraseca, was released on June 1, 2019. The deluxe edition of the novel was published on June 18, 2019.

== Plot ==
At the University of Orlais, Celene meets with Leliana, the Left Hand of the Divine, to ask that Divine Justinia V act directly to try and ease the tension between mages and templars. Leliana and the Empress agree that the Divine will make a declaration at a ball thrown in her honor in no more than a month.

Briala has been Empress Celene's elf servant for many, many years. They worked together in secret, both within Orlesian society's complex game of political intrigue and as lovers; it could never come to light that they were romantically involved, as it would be as scandalous for a lady of an estate to sleep with the gardener. However, since Celene promised Briala she would one day free the elves of Orlais, Briala continued to do Celene's bidding in secret. Briala was mainly her spymaster, using the city elves as her eyes and ears. Along with Celene's chevalier champion, Ser Michel, Briala ensured Celene kept the throne while her cousin Grand Duke Gaspard schemed.

Gaspard eventually launched a coup attempt against Celene while she is in the city of Halamshiral, which forces the Empress and her entourage to do their best to stay hidden from Gaspard and his agents as they attempt to track her down. Celene's goal is to return to Val Royeux and rally forces loyal to her as her only chance of stopping him. Along the way, Celene encounters the mysterious elven apostate Felassan, a clan of Dalish elves who has summoned a powerful demon, the magical mirror artifacts known as the Eluvians, and is even forced to work alongside Gaspard himself to ensure their mutual survival.

== Reception ==
Reviewer Liz Bourke commented that while her experience of reading The Masked Empire felt more like a prologue for a future game as opposed to a complete narrative in and of itself, she found the novel to be enjoyable and praised Trick Weekes for being a "significantly better prose writer than David Gaider, who authored the previous Dragon Age tie-in novels". She concluded that The Masked Empire is an entertaining novel, "despite possessing in full measure the flaws of its source material". Dominika "Mara" Bieńkowska from the Polish website Nerdheim scored The Masked Empire 9 out of 10.

Keri Honea from Playstation Lifestyle considered The Masked Empire to be essential reading for players, as the novel provides much context for the backstory and lore of Inquisition's events, including how and why Michel freed Imshael in the first place, as well as the “Wicked Eyes, Wicked Hearts” quest. Various sources have cited The Masked Empire as a notable example of BioWare's approach of publishing novels and written works in other media which introduce forthcoming locations, ancillary characters and quest lines leading up to a new release or a further project in the distant future, with the goal of advance the overall narrative of the series beyond the perspective of a specific video game protagonist.
