= Dragon Age: The Veilguard =

2024 action role-playing game

- Developer: BioWare
- Publisher: Electronic Arts
- Directors: Corinne Busche; John Epler
- Producers: Amber Vincent; Rob Davidson; Scylla Costa
- Programmers: Andy Kempling; Christopher Kerr; Michael Webb
- Artist: Matt Rhodes
- Writer: Trick Weekes
- Composers: Hans Zimmer; Lorne Balfe
- Series: Dragon Age
- Engine: Frostbite
- Platforms: PlayStation 5; Windows; Xbox Series X/S
- Release: October 31, 2024
- Genre: Action role-playing
- Mode: Single-player

Dragon Age: The Veilguard is a action role-playing game developed by BioWare and published by Electronic Arts (EA). It was released on October 31, 2024 for the PlayStation 5, Windows, and Xbox Series X/S platforms. The Veilguard is the fourth major game in the Dragon Age franchise, and the sequel to Dragon Age: Inquisition (2014).

The story follows a customizable player character called Rook as they prevent the elven trickster god Solas from ending the world. In the process, Rook accidentally frees two other amoral elven gods and must also prevent them from conquering the world. As in the game's predecessor, the player character is controlled from a third-person perspective, but Veilguard foregoes Inquisition's open world in favour of discrete levels accessed via fast travel. Likewise, tactical elements were deprioritized over a new combat system emphasizing combo abilities. The game's approach to combat was influenced by Sony's God of War (2018).

The game began development in 2015 and was affected by lengthy delays and changes to staff. Originally planned as a live-service game, the game was re-envisioned as a single-player title following the success of EA's Star Wars Jedi: Fallen Order (2019). It was originally announced as Dragon Age: Dreadwolf in 2022, and retitled Dragon Age: The Veilguard in June 2024.

Veilguard's release marked the biggest launch for a BioWare game on Steam and reached 1.5 million players across all platforms by December 31, 2024, which was nevertheless well below EA's expectations. The game received generally positive reviews from critics. Veilguard won Outstanding Video Game at the 36th GLAAD Media Awards and Game of the Year at the Gayming Awards, received nominations at The Game Awards, Golden Joystick Awards, and DICE Awards, and was featured in several publications' year-end lists for 2024.

Veilguard was the final Dragon Age game and BioWare's final release before the studio's shutdown in 2026.

== Gameplay ==
In this gameplay screenshot, Rook is fighting against enemies with two AI-controlled companion characters.

Dragon Age: The Veilguard is a single-player action role-playing game. In previous games, a player's role-playing choices were imported from save files or the web application Dragon Age Keep. Veilguard instead allows players to only select three choices they made in Inquisition. Creative director John Epler said that decisions made in the previous games largely did not impact events in Veilguard, which allowed the game's creators "to avoid contradicting" past choices individual players made.

During character creation, the player can choose a lineage for their player character (human, dwarf, elf, or qunari), a fighting class (rogue, mage, or warrior), and a character backstory with one of six faction associations. As with the choice of origin in the original game, the faction association sets the character's course throughout the game. Unlike in previous games, customization options include body size and body part selections that are independent of the voice or pronouns (she/her, he/him, or they/them) chosen for the player character. Players are able to remake their player character from Dragon Age: Inquisition which appears in the game, alongside some other previous Dragon Age characters.

There are seven companion characters from which two can be chosen to form a combat party of three. Unlike previous games in the series, players cannot directly control the companions in combat. The companions in Veilguard are described as pansexual, allowing romances with player characters of any gender; but Busche said that they were not "playersexual", or only attracted to the player character. Busche also noted that while player decisions can impact relationships with companions, the developers "built finding forgiveness into those relationship dynamics". Increasing the bond between Rook and a companion allows the companion to "grow more powerful". While the combat system is now real-time action-based, as opposed to the tactical–strategy approach of earlier Dragon Age titles, Veilguard still employs a pause-and-play mechanism similar to Inquisition's. Instead of that game's open world design, Veilguard uses a "hub-and-spoke design" where players get around the game's world through magical portals; the areas so accessed vary in size.

== Synopsis ==
=== Setting ===
A map of Thedas featuring the main regions of the setting. Veilguard occurs primarily in the northern regions of Thedas.

The story begins ten years after the events of Dragon Age: Inquisition. Fen'Harel, the elven god of betrayal and rebellion - previously known as the companion Solas - is attempting to destroy the Veil, the metaphysical boundary between the physical world and the world of spirits and demons called the Fade. Solas previously created the Veil to imprison the other elven gods after their misuse of power, but now attempts to restore the world of ancient elves out of regret for sealing ancient elves from the Fade and causing the downfall of their society. Varric Tethras, Viscount of Kirkwall, and Lace Harding, lead scout of the Inquisition, are tasked by the Inquisition to stop Solas.

The protagonist player character is "Rook", a member of one of six factions: the Antivan Crows, an order of assassins from Antiva; the Grey Wardens, an order dedicated to fighting darkspawn with their headquarters in the Anderfels; the Lords of Fortune, a guild of treasure hunters from Rivain; the Mourn Watch, guardians of the Grand Necropolis in Nevarra; the Shadow Dragons, a Tevinter resistance faction opposing corruption and slavery; or the Veil Jumpers, a group dedicated to uncovering the unexplored forest of Arlathan. After disobeying the orders of their faction and being sent away to ease tensions, Rook was recruited by Varric and Harding in their search for Solas.

Alongside Harding, there are six other mandatory companions: Bellara Lutare, a Veil Jumper; Davrin, a Grey Warden; Emmrich Volkarin, a Mourn Watcher; Lucanis Dellamorte, an Antivan Crow; Neve Gallus, a Shadow Dragon; and Taash, a Lord of Fortune.

=== Plot ===
Rook, Varric, and Harding pursue Solas through the Tevinter capital city of Minrathous. Joined by Neve, the team locates Solas in Arlathan Forest, the former capital of the ancient elven empire, where Solas plans to conduct a ritual to destroy the Veil. Rook interrupts the ritual, which inadvertently releases two elven gods—Elgar'nan and Ghilan'nain—from imprisonment, and traps Solas within the Fade. Solas forms a blood connection with Rook, while Varric is badly injured in the encounter.

Elgar'nan and Ghilan'nain intend to harness the Blight, the mass movement of the darkspawn after they corrupt a Tevinter Old God into becoming an Archdemon, in their quest to destroy Thedas and build a new elven empire on its ruins. Rook takes up residence within the Lighthouse, Solas' former base of operations within the Fade, and recovers the lyrium dagger used by Solas during the ritual. Travelling through the Crossroads, a pathway used by ancient elves within the Fade, Rook enlists the help of several factions across northern Thedas in their attempt to stop Elgar'nan and Ghilan'nain.

Alongside Harding and Neve, Rook recruits Bellara, Lucanis, and Davrin. Elgar'nan and Ghilan'nain send blighted dragons to both Minrathous and the Antivan city of Treviso, forcing Rook to choose which city to save. After recruiting Emmrich and Taash, Rook confronts the First Warden at Weisshaupt, home of the Grey Wardens. Unable to convince him of the danger posed by the gods, Rook either talks him down or knocks him unconscious, as Weisshaupt comes under siege by Ghilan'nain and arisen Archdemon, Razikale. Despite heavy Warden losses, Razikale is killed, rendering Ghilan'nain mortal.

Rook learns that Elgar'nan and Ghilan'nain plan to conduct a ritual on Tearstone Island on the eve of the next eclipse, preparing to pierce the Veil with a red lyrium dagger and flood Thedas with the Blight. Rallying their allies with the aid of the Inquisitor, Rook and their companions storm Tearstone Island, fighting off the Venatori, Tevinter supremacists, and the Antaam, the military of the qunari. Either Davrin or Harding sacrifices themself, allowing Lucanis to deliver a killing blow to Ghilan'nain. Solas betrays Rook, entraps them within the Fade prison, and seizes the lyrium dagger. Rook escapes with the aid of their companions after learning that Varric was killed by Solas and that Solas had used blood magic to alter Rook's memory of the event. Elgar'nan retreats to Minrathous and takes over the palace of the Archon, with Solas in pursuit.

With the help of their remaining allies, Rook and the team break through the fortified defenses of the Venatori and the Antaam; they also learn that killing Elgar'nan will collapse the Veil and that an elven god must be bound to the Veil to uphold it. Solas relinquishes the lyrium dagger to Rook and helps them defeat Elgar'nan and his Archdemon, Lusacan, before again betraying them and trying to bring down the Veil. Rook can forcibly bind Solas to the Veil either by fighting him or tricking him with a duplicate dagger created by the team; alternatively, Solas can be convinced to stop the ritual and voluntarily bind himself to atone for his mistakes.

== Development ==
=== Early development ===
The development of the fourth main entry in the Dragon Age series, code-named "Joplin", began in 2015 with Mike Laidlaw as its creative director. It was intended to be a smaller, more narrative-focused game set in the Tevinter Imperium region of the game's world setting, Thedas. According to one developer, they were striving for "a hugely reactive game, smaller in scope than Dragon Age: Inquisition but much larger in player choice, followers, reactivity, and depth." The project was focused on repeat play with evolving areas, branching missions based on player choices, and heists, incorporating systemic narrative mechanics that allow players to persuade or extort guards.

Development of the new Dragon Age was put on hold in late 2016, due to challenges with the development of BioWare's other games Mass Effect: Andromeda and Anthem, a massively multiplayer online game that was very different from Bioware's previous single-player games. Many Dragon Age contributors were pulled into the final months of Andromeda's development, with the remainder later joining the Anthem team, leading to "Joplin" being cancelled in October 2017. Several veteran Dragon Age staff, including Laidlaw, left the company in response to Joplin's cancellation in 2017.

=== Project reboot ===
In 2018, development of the game was restarted under the code-name "Morrison". Mark Darrah remained as an executive producer, while Matthew Goldman took over the position of creative director for the project from 2017 to 2021. Initially, the game included a live-service component based on Anthem's code, which developers felt was publisher EA's desire to emulate higher selling series such as FIFA and Battlefield. Later, EA and BioWare decided to remove the planned multiplayer components from Morrison and to develop it as a single-player game only.

EA's decision was based on the success of the single-player game Star Wars Jedi: Fallen Order and the disappointing sales of massively multiplayer online Anthem, leading to the live service being terminated in February 2021. Several developers felt that the multiplayer Dragon Age prototypes lacked the feel of previous single-player games, supporting the shift away from multiplayer.

After the decision was taken to abandon the multiplayer model, BioWare was not granted a full reset. Instead, the development team was required to change the game's fundamental structure and narrative on the fly within only 18 months. This constrained approach led to a final product that retained elements of its earlier multiplayer design, including limited player choices and narrative depth, which conflicted with the expectations traditionally associated with BioWare's single-player games.

As the project was rebooted, the gameplay shifted to real-time action combat gameplay influenced by God of War, reducing the turn-based elements seen in previous Dragon Age games. Hans Zimmer and Lorne Balfe composed the game's soundtrack, replacing Trevor Morris, the composer for Inquisition.

=== Staff changes and post-release ===
The long development led to many changes in staff and leadership. By December 3, 2020, Darrah had resigned from BioWare, replaced by BioWare Austin studio head Christian Dailey as executive producer. Goldman left BioWare by November 2021, and was replaced as Creative Director by John Epler. Dailey left BioWare in February 2022. Corinne Busche became game director thereafter, Benoit Houle director of product development, and Mac Walters production director. Walters, in turn, left BioWare in January 2023. In March 2023, Darrah returned as a consultant for the game and the Mass Effect team joined the production of Veilguard, according to EA.

In August 2023, BioWare laid off 50 people working on Veilguard and the next Mass Effect game; this included Mary Kirby who was one of the series' original writers and credited with "creating Varric and the Qunari". PC Gamer commented "that's not to say there are no veterans of the good old days left, but you're looking at a very different group of people than the one that made the studio's greatest hits". In October, seven of the laid-off workers sued BioWare for additional compensation, complaining that BioWare's non-disclosure agreements prevented them from adding their work on Veilguard to their portfolio.

With the game's release in October 2024, active development of the game was ended in January 2025, aside from fixing game-breaking bugs should they arise. Unlike past installments, the game would receive no downloadable content (DLC) or any other major additional post-launch content. Veilguard game director Corinne Busche exited BioWare for a role at a different company. BioWare announced a company restructure on January 29, citing its focus on Mass Effect 5.

As BioWare was no longer working on multiple titles, any staff that were not assigned to Mass Effect 5 were loaned to other studios under EA. This included writer Sheryl Chee, who joined Motive Studio, with EA later announcing that the shifts in staffing were permanent. Several members of the Veilguard team were terminated, including Trick Weekes and other long-term BioWare staff. The game was released on Xbox Game Pass in August 2025.

== Marketing ==
Dragon Age 4 was announced at The Game Awards in December 2018. Promotional material showed red lyrium (a corrupted power source of magic in the game's universe) and the character Solas – the Dread Wolf – as significant elements of the game's plot. Marketing on social media was focused on the tagline "The Dread Wolf Rises".

In August 2020, a concept art video was released at Gamescom. In December 2020, a teaser trailer featured the dwarven character Varric Tethras as narrator, as well as Solas. No details of the game were released at the July 2021 EA Play event. Jeffrey Grubb, for VentureBeat, commented that "holding back during this EA Play is just about enabling the publisher to get the game into position to begin marketing it in earnest. That will likely start in 2022". Ash Parrish, for Kotaku, highlighted that given all the changes in development "Dragon Age 4 is probably not yet ready to be shown to the world" and that "BioWare has been drip-feeding fans information for years now". Grubb, in a follow-up article for VentureBeat in January 2022, stated that "EA hasn't decided on when to begin marketing the project".

In June 2022, the game's title was announced as Dragon Age: Dreadwolf. Parrish, now for The Verge, highlighted that the title reveal for the game was "exciting for a lot of fans" because it not only makes Solas the antagonist of the upcoming game but also makes Dreadwolf a direct sequel unlike previous installments in the franchise. A teaser trailer released in December 2023 featured new locations: Antiva, Rivain, and the Anderfels.

In June 2024, the game was retitled Dragon Age: The Veilguard. BioWare explained that the previously titular Dreadwolf remains part of the game; however, the updated title is a stronger reflection of the game's focus. BioWare general manager Gary McKay stated that the retitling was not due to focus testing:

We actually think sticking with Dreadwolf would have been the safer choice – 'Dread Wolf' is a cool name after all! In the end, it was most important for us to have a title that was authentic to the companions that are the heart of this adventure we've created. We've worked throughout development to create really incredible backstories for each companion that intersect with the main narrative in meaningful ways.

On the title change, Ed Smith of PCGamesN commented that he liked "the sound of the new Dragon Age, and its focus on a cast of characters and their connections, so a name that reflects that conceit feels right". In contrast, Andy Chalk of PC Gamer and Kenneth Shepard of Kotaku disliked the name change. Chalk felt Veilguard "doesn't convey anything in the way Dreadwolf does" – "I see the word 'Dreadwolf' and I instinctively know that some bad shit is happening". Shepard stated, "I understand the naming convention lines up with Dragon Age: Inquisition, which also was named after the team you were assembling, but Dreadwolf was a striking title that I will dearly miss".

Following the release of the trailer introducing the companions, both Robin Valentine of PC Gamer and Edwin Evans-Thirlwell of Rock Paper Shotgun were apprehensive of the design shift from previous games. Valentine thought the companions looked "more ready for a battle pass than an epic quest" with Evans-Thirlwell echoing that it had more of an Ocean's Eleven vibe than a Dragon Age one. Gita Jackson of Aftermath viewed the "weird and bad" companion trailer as part of EA's "long legacy" of poor marketing since "Dragon Age has been the victim of this before".

Critics who attended the 2024 Summer Game Fest and experienced a hands-off gameplay demo were more positive about the upcoming game and felt that the companion trailer did not accurately portray it. Mike Minotti of GamesBeat commented, "don't let that weird CG trailer scare you". Both Sean Booker of CNET and Alex Donaldson of VG247 were reminded of Mass Effect games; Maddy Myers of Polygon and Parrish of The Verge thought the updated customization options in character creation stood out. Parrish reserved "final judgment" for the finished product as "an hour of hands-off gameplay isn't enough to completely dispel the lingering concerns that the game's tortured development cycle has affected its quality. But I know the Dragon Age series, and based on the conversations I've had and the little I've seen, it feels like despite the turmoil, BioWare still got it right".

On October 31, 2024, Dragon Age: The Veilguard was launched for PlayStation 5, Windows, and Xbox Series X/S. For 2024's Dragon Age Day, BioWare released a free standalone version of Veilguard's character creator on PlayStation 5, Windows, and Xbox Series X/S; players can transfer their Rook iterations to the full game after purchase.

=== Tie-in media ===
Dragon Age: Tevinter Nights is an anthology of short stories set in Thedas, which serves as a prequel to the events that lead to Veilguard. It was published on March 10, 2020. Susana Polo of Polygon noted that it is "clear that Tevinter Nights was written during a time in production when the general factions, some NPCs, and even a few companions were solidly in development" as these all appear in the anthology "years before they were officially announced". Polo explained that while the anthology is a "great portrait" of the "relevant" Dragon Age canon before the game, the caveat with Tevinter Nights is "that some of the details set down in it may have changed between 2020 and" the release of Veilguard.

Dragon Age: The Missing is a four-issue limited series comic, by writer George Mann, published by Dark Horse Comics from January 25 to May 10, 2023. This prequel focuses on the continuing investigation into Solas by Varric Tethras and Lace Harding as they follow a lead to the Dark Roads; several Veilguard companions appear in the series.

A tie-in fantasy podcast titled Dragon Age: Vows & Vengeance was released weekly from August 29 to October 17, 2024. The eight-episode audio drama focuses on backstories for the game, with each episode featuring a different Veilguard companion, and also features podcast-exclusive characters. The podcast was an honoree in two podcast categories at the 2025 Webby Awards – "Best Limited Series" and "Original Music Score / Sound Design".

== Reception ==
=== Critical reception ===
Reception

Aggregate scores
Aggregator	Score
Metacritic	PS5: 82/100 (Note: Based on 70 scored reviews of 74 total reviews); PC: 76/100 (Note: Based on 38 scored reviews of 39 total reviews); XSXS: 85/100 (Note: Based on 12 scored reviews of 14 total reviews)
OpenCritic	71% recommend (Note: Based on 145 reviews)

Review scores
Publication	Score
Game Informer	8/10
IGN	9/10
PC Gamer (US)	79/100
The Guardian	3/5

Dragon Age: The Veilguard received "generally favorable" reviews from critics for its Windows, Xbox Series X/S, and PlayStation 5 versions, according to the review aggregator website Metacritic. OpenCritic determined that 71% of critics recommended the game. Veilguard was subject to review bombing on Metacritic, with some users criticizing the game for being "woke". Some outlets noted that the user reviews of Veilguard on Steam, which requires users to play the game before leaving a review, had a "mostly positive" rating. In response, Metacritic emphasized its moderation system, which would remove abusive reviews.

Hayes Madsen of Rolling Stone called Veilguard a "fresh start for the franchise" with the game "practically a soft reset". Leana Hafer for IGN similarly commented that the "story feels like both a send-off and a soft reboot, in a way, which was paradoxically a bit refreshing and disappointing at the same time". She also found it "cool" that the Inquisitor returns as "a fairly important character". Andy Bickerton of NPR viewed the game as a "well-executed action RPG". However, he called the decision to not include prior player narrative choices a "letdown", noting that "it's easy to see how this squandered potential, along with the tonal inconsistencies, could have arisen out of Veilguard's near-decade of troubled production". Lauren Morton of PC Gamer thought that a downside of perceived streamlining and eliminating the "most common RPG frictions" is that it "can feel more action adventure than RPG at moments".

Critics were mixed on the game's story. Matt Purslow from IGN said that Veilguard was "at war with itself", as he felt that the game was not interested in exploring the franchise's past, despite being its first direct sequel, and that the game sidelined major characters such as Solas and Varric. Malindy Hetfeld of The Guardian referred to the "surprisingly mediocre" writing in Veilguard, describing the protagonist Rook as more of a witty observer than a "person with opinions". She also found the "comically evil" new villainous gods disappointing compared to the more "compelling" Solas. Hafer opined that Veilguard has "weird" pacing, and that the overarching plot "is nothing particularly outstanding in its overall structure", with the only interesting factor being Solas. Madsen argued that Solas was "a secondary protagonist", with the game focusing on his choices, their impact, "and how your journey as Rook mirrors" his journey. Ash Parrish of The Verge appreciated how Solas's arc subverted her desire to kill him despite longstanding animosity; she praised BioWare for crafting "his story arc in a way that didn't soften his actions as villain backstories typically do, but in a way that I felt compelled to make a different choice". Reviewers were divided over how consequential player choices were to the narrative, with some finding major decisions "few and far between".

Madsen praised Veilguard for its attention to detail when showcasing the player's iteration of Rook and the game's companions, calling the characters "wonderfully written and well integrated into the plot". Todd Harper of Polygon emphasized the companions as the heart of the game, noting that they were "weird and idiosyncratic in the best ways". Kazuma Hashimoto of Them commented that at a surface level the companions feel like "fantasy clichés and tropes", but with earned trust reveal "mundane moments" that make them feel closer to "normal people"; he also praised both the romance and non-romance options for interacting with companions. Hafer appreciated that companions are each "stars of their own story" with "complex, memorable, likable, distinct personalities", but was disappointed that in combat they felt more like extensions of the player character. Parrish enjoyed the "fun banter" of companions, and praised the romance options in Veilguard, highlighting that unlike previous Dragon Age games, it explicitly indicates when the player becomes locked into a romance path. Conversely, Oliver Brandt of Sports Illustrated viewed the choice to make all companions romanceable regardless of the player's gender expression as "a small step back" from other Dragon Age games. Harvey Randall of PC Gamer highlighted a lack of nuance in Rook's romantic dialogue if a player chooses to discuss Rook's gender identity. Morton thought companions lacked nuance and individual characterizations, noting that "good people don't make great characters". She further criticized the lack of a "functional mechanism for disapproval" and interpersonal group conflicts.

Veilguard generally received praise for its inclusive character creator and representations of transgender and non-binary characters. Alyssa Mora of IGN emphasized the character creator's "body diversity" where "the options feel almost endless". Both Robin Bea of Inverse and Brandt commended Taash's story arc, with Brandt noting while BioWare has previously "touched on queer stories", Veilguard "goes one step further, unashamedly and unabashedly calling one of its most compelling characters nonbinary". Bea acknowledged the "smart writing" in Veilguard in addressing transgender representation. However, she critiqued the use of a coming out narrative as "low-hanging fruit", and thought Rook's gender identity was not fully explored beyond Taash's storyline and so did not "always feel like a fully-actualized trans character". Stacey Henley of TheGamer appreciated the deliberate use of modern language in Taash's story in comparison to Inquisition's Krem, while noting that the language has been contentious with audiences as potentially "immersion breaking". Randall was more critical, noting how Veilguard "both failed and succeeded" in the narrative aspects focusing on non-binary characters, and that the overall "scattershot, clumsy, and unpolished" writing impacts the "use of queer language in a fantasy context". They found the lack of a fictional etymology connecting the word to the cultures of Thedas problematic, reflecting wider story issues as the game seems "barely interested in the politics of its own setting".

Critics enjoyed Veilguard's graphics and level design but were divided on the game's combat. Bickerton felt that Veilguard's strongest feature was its action gameplay, writing "mastering combat and party composition is a thoroughly rewarding experience from start to finish". He also highlighted the game's "accessibility and difficulty settings" as being welcoming for more casual players. Hetfeld viewed Veilguard's combat as functional but repetitive, without "much room for strategy", and similar to numerous other games. Hafer called the boss fights the highlight of combat. Parrish praised the combo system, the new elemental effects on weapons, and the ability for player mages to switch between melee and ranged combat for a "kinetic, almost chaotic energy". However, she critiqued the length of encounters from the "wave after wave of tanky enemies with multiple health bars". Harper thought the combat was "hit or miss", and that the combo system was less complex than in Inquisition and the Mass Effect games. Hafer stated that the game has "visual splendor", and Harper called it "graphically gorgeous". Parrish opined that the "companions and environments are arresting in their design". Bickerton thought that the level design was an improvement on Inquisition's "bland open zones", and praised side quests for their depth and the rewarding of exploration with "useful loot and impactful plot points". Morton viewed each area's "incredible visual design" as a standout feature of Veilguard. She found it was better off for removing Inquisition's "giant zones" and having "more constrained maps of coiled corridors and clearings".

=== Sales ===
Upon release, Veilguard ranked first on Steam's global top sellers chart, reaching over 85,000 concurrent players during the opening weekend. This broke BioWare's record for the most players on Steam for one of their games, while becoming one of EA's highest single-player totals for concurrent players. Rhiannon Bevan from TheGamer wrote that Steam figures indicated the game was performing well compared to BioWare's recent releases. In the UK, Veilguard debuted at No. 7 on the sales chart. In the US, the game debuted at No. 6.

In January 2025, EA announced that Veilguard had engaged only 1.5 million players (Note: EA has not defined "engagement". IGN highlights that EA does not differentiate between unit sales or players acquired through EA's Play Pro subscription service.) during the three months ending December 31, 2024, underperforming their expectations by nearly half. The same month, EA reported a poor performance of EA Sports FC 25 and a 18% loss in share value following their holiday earning reports. EA's CEO Andrew Wilson noted Veilguard as a high quality launch that was well-reviewed, but speculated that EA's single-player games may need to reach "beyond the core audience" with "shared-world features and deeper engagement".

Despite initial sales, the game did not meet expectations for Electronic Arts. According to Jason Schreier of Bloomberg News, the game missed its sales target by 50%. This, coupled with poor performance of BioWare's previous games and cost-cutting measures following EA's acquisition led by Sauda Arabia's Public Investment Fund, led to EA closing BioWare in October 2026.

=== Accolades ===
Dragon Age: The Veilguard was nominated for Ultimate Game of the Year at the Golden Joystick Awards. At the Equinox Latam Game Awards, the game was nominated for Best Narrative and Best RPG. Veilguard received 10 nominations at the 5th Canadian Game Awards, including Game of the Year. The game appeared on multiple publications' year-end lists of 2024, including Time (1st), Associated Press (4th), and GamesRadar+ (3rd). Veilguard was also named as Best RPG of 2024 by GamesRadar+.

Year	Award	Category	Result	Ref.
2024	Golden Joystick Awards	Ultimate Game of The Year	Nominated	
2024	The Game Awards	Innovation in Accessibility	Nominated	
2024	Titanium Awards	Best Narrative Design	Nominated	
2025	28th Annual DICE Awards	Role-Playing Game of the Year	Nominated	
2025	25th Game Developers Choice Awards	Best Technology	Honorable mention	
2025	25th Game Developers Choice Awards	Social Impact	Honorable mention	
2025	21st British Academy Games Awards	Animation	Longlisted	
2025	21st British Academy Games Awards	Music	Longlisted	
2025	21st British Academy Games Awards	Narrative	Nominated	
2025	36th GLAAD Media Awards	Outstanding Video Game	Won	
2025	Canadian Game Awards	Best Narrative	Won	
2025	Canadian Game Awards	Best Score/Soundtrack	Won	
2025	Canadian Game Awards	Best Audio Design	Won	
2025	Webby Awards	Best Music/Sound Design, Games Features (AI, Immersive & Games)	Honoree	
2025	Webby Awards	Best User Experience, Games Features (AI, Immersive & Games)	Nominated	
2025	Webby Awards	Technical Achievement, Games Features (AI, Immersive & Games)	Nominated	
2025	Hugo Awards	Best Game or Interactive Work	Finalist	
2025	Gayming Awards	Game of the Year	Won	
2025	Gayming Awards	Gayming Magazine Readers' Award	Nominated	
2025	Gayming Awards	Best LGBTQ+ Character	Won (Note: The character Rook won the award. Erika Ishii, who was one of voice actors for Rook, also won "Best LGBTQ+ Voice Actor of the Year".)	
2026	24th Game Audio Network Guild Awards	Sound Design of the Year	Pending	
