= Solas (Dragon Age) =

Video game character

- Dragon Age character
- Solas as he appears in the 2022 promotional trailer for Dragon Age: The Veilguard (originally titled Dragon Age: Dreadwolf)
- First appearance: Dragon Age: Inquisition; November 18, 2014
- Last appearance: Dragon Age: The Veilguard; October 31, 2024
- Voiced by: Gareth David-Lloyd

In-universe information
- Aliases: Dread Wolf; Fen'Harel
- Race: Elf
- Class: Mage
- Specialization: Rift Mage

Solas is a character in BioWare's Dragon Age franchise. He first appears in the 2014 video game Dragon Age: Inquisition, where he serves as a party member. He presents himself as an elven outlaw mage who operates outside of the edicts of the Chantry, the dominant religious organization in Thedas, the world setting of Dragon Age. Solas joins the Inquisition and serves as an expert on the Fade, a metaphysical realm that is tied to Thedas which is normally accessible only through dreaming, and its denizens. His knowledge and expertise prove instrumental in aiding the Inquisition's struggle to close the Breach, a massive dimensional tear in the sky that allows multitudes of demonic spirits to pass through into the physical world through dimensional rifts. A post-credit scene of Inquisition reveals his true identity as Fen'Harel. Trespasser, the final DLC pack released for Inquisition, provides further insight into his backstory and motives, as well as his involvement in the current world state of Thedas.

Solas was the focal point of pre-release promotional efforts for the fourth mainline entry in the Dragon Age video game series – titled Dragon Age: The Veilguard. The game opens with the protagonist Rook disrupting Solas' ritual to bring down the Veil which unleashes two blighted elven gods that Solas had sealed away. The disruption magically ties Rook to Solas; throughout the game, the player has the opportunity to uncover Solas' memories and regrets around historic events he was involved in. He is voiced by Welsh actor Gareth David-Lloyd.

== Development ==
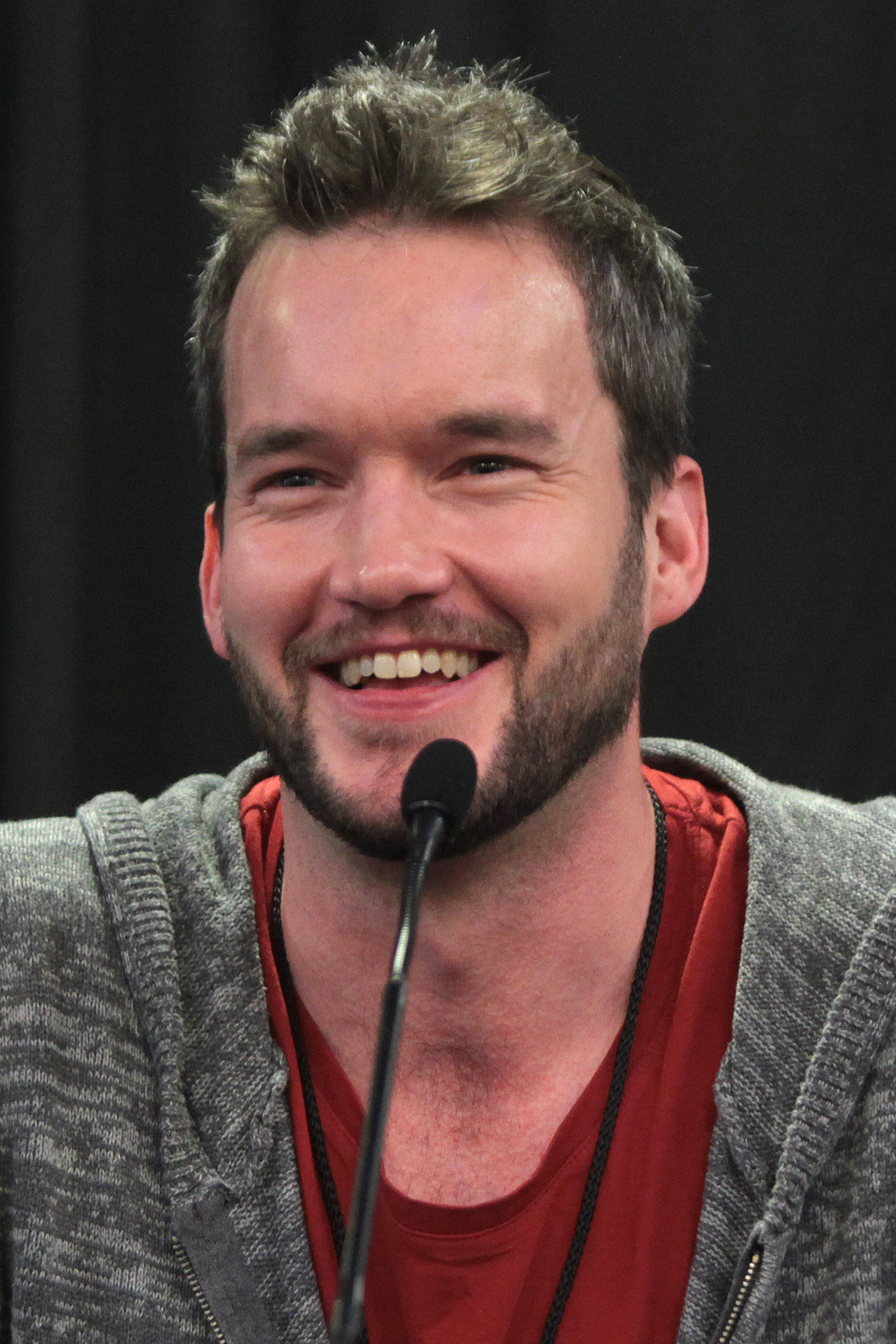
Gareth David-Lloyd, the voice of Solas in Inquisition and Veilguard

Solas was written by Trick Weekes with heavy input from lead writer for Dragon Age: Inquisition David Gaider, although the character was already conceived and named prior to Weekes joining the project. In an interview, Weekes said that aspects of Solas were based on David Tennant's Doctor Who performance, inspiring Solas' humanity as well as his ancient nature. Weekes noted that writing a character with hidden depths like Solas provided a great deal of both difficulty and opportunity. In a video uploaded on BioWare's official YouTube channel titled "What Makes a Good Character?", Weekes used Harry Potter as a metaphor to explain how Solas perceives himself as the hero of the story; he feels he is "this luckless, unfortunate person who by an unpleasant destiny and the simple fact that no one else has the ability to do it, that it has to be him and that someone else would get it wrong".

Originally, Solas was not planned as a romance option in Dragon Age: Inquisition; according to Mike Laidlaw, BioWare redesigned him as a potential love interest for a female elven Inquisitor when they extended the game's development for a year. Weekes noted that this was an opportunity to increase the basic sadness of the character. Solas breaks up his relationship with the Inquisitor at the conclusion of the romance subplot regardless of the player's choices. Jessica Barnes of GameRant noted that Solas is "only romanceable by female elves" which is "due to the revelation of his role as an antagonist in the final moments of Dragon Age: Inquisition" – BioWare limited "his romantic interests" in order "to avoid the harmful tropes of the villainous bisexual character".

During a Q&A session at the Phoenix Fan Fest 2015, Gareth David-Lloyd revealed that he had been recording voice work for Solas over a period of two and a half years. He was provided with a simple outline and some lines on a screen to work with in lieu of a comprehensive backstory for Solas; about three or four months after David-Lloyd started he developed a stronger idea of the character. In Inquisition, Solas sometimes speaks in poetic meter, and the player character gains approval of Solas when replying in kind. This is a deliberate design choice, given Solas' characterization and personality.

John Epler, creative director for Dragon Age: The Veilguard, commented that Solas was at the center of Dragon Age 4 from the very beginning of development, as the team felt that when ending Trespasser they were promising fans to tell a story centered on Solas. Epler highlighted that Veilguard's protagonist Rook creates a connection with Solas after getting in his way and becomes "almost a mirror of Solas" which leads to "interesting interactions and reactions between the two of them". During Veilguard, Rook sees Solas' memories, which as Epler explained, "explore some aspects of Solas' personality". Elper and Game Director Corinne Busche stated that the ending options in Veilguard's were primarily focused on the different "fantasies of dealing with Solas". The redemption path was indented for players who like the character along with an additional variant for romance fans "who wanted their Inquisitor to have that tragic embrace in eternity with Solas"; the fight option was for players who saw Solas as a "bad guy" and wanted to beat him; and the outsmart option was made to give players the "opportunity to pull one over" on Solas after Solas spent the duration of Veilguard "needling" Rook in a "condescending" manner. Elper and Busche highlighted the tone differences between the endings, where the fight ending leaves Solas "angry" and "frothing" while the outsmart ending has Solas acknowledge he has met his match and retain a "bit of smugness" for his mentorship of Rook. The fourth ending, where all of Rook's companions die, is "more of a pyrrhic victory" as the player both runs out of luck and preparedness.

=== Visual design ===
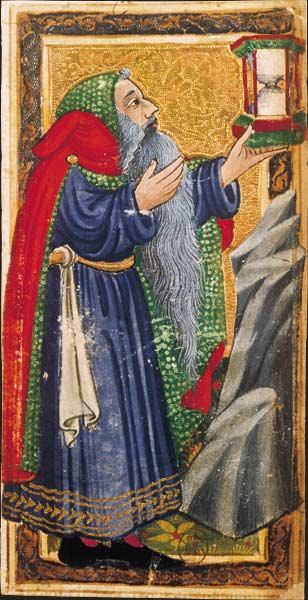
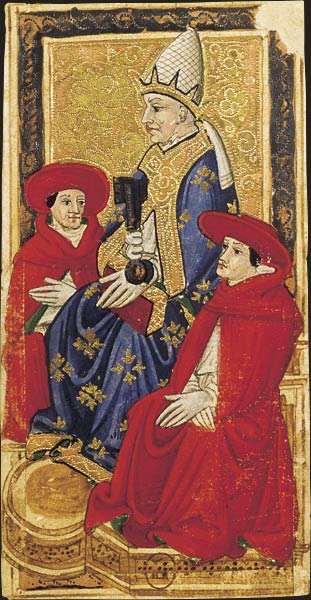
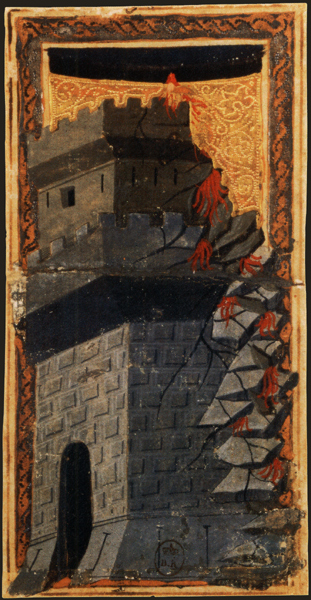
From left to right, the Major Arcana cards used to represent Solas are: The Hermit, The Hierophant, and The Tower.

Solas is envisioned by Weekes to be a middle-aged man in his early to mid-forties. His appearance is reflective of a wandering nomad's lifestyle, who journeys from place to place without a set destination. BioWare's designers intended Solas to appear as if he is wearing all that he owns, and that his items of clothing are meant to look like homemade improvisations born from necessity. The major characters in Inquisition are also depicted in tarot cards in the game's menus, with some cards changing over the course of the game. Solas is initially represented as The Hermit; a romanced version switches to The Hierophant, followed by the card in reserve after the breakup. The character's final card is The Tower and features his Dread Wolf persona. Angela D. Mitchell of The Fandomentals noted that Solas is often shown with "his man and Dread Wolf forms together" in the tarot cards and in-game murals. Mitchell wrote that these "images have always been heavily symbolic and metaphorical" with indications of the character's internal thoughts – the romance card features a red-eyed, "white, fuzzy, and adorable" wolf "without the Pride Demon eyes" while the ending card shows Solas "heading off into darkness" with "the massive shadowy Dread Wolf (complete with Pride Demon eyes) looming over him, but also following obediently behind him". In Veilguard, the designers wanted the character to have "cast off his hermit disguise" and instead don "the ancient elven god equivalent of a business suit". This version of Solas was not designed to be "flashy" but instead "calculating and intentional".

Concept art displayed in The Art of Dragon Age: Inquisition book shows the creative process for Solas as the team develops his look after many renditions to match the ideas provided by other creative teams. After exploring many different hairstyles, the final decision was made to design Solas with a bold, bald head. This is intended to evoke a sense of ageless wisdom required by his character. A side quest in Veilguard allows Rook to see memories of Solas during the rebellion he led – this younger version of the character had hair. The Art of Dragon Age: The Veilguard noted "that hair loss would be the only outward indication of an ancient elf's age" so while both Solas and Elgar'nan are bald, the latter wears a wig.

== Fictional appearances ==
=== Dragon Age: Inquisition ===
During the opening sequence of events in Inquisition, Solas is encountered fighting demons alongside Varric Tethras and a few Inquisition personnel. This follows the aftermath of a massive explosion at a peace conference which killed everyone present, except for the protagonist, who was discovered emerging from a Fade rift. Solas presents himself to the fledgling Inquisition's leadership as a self-taught hedge mage who spends much of his time dreaming in ancient ruins and learning about what lies beyond the Veil, a metaphysical barrier which normally prevents direct physical access between the physical world and the Fade. This enables him to wields powers developed outside of conventional teaching and who has no affiliation with the Chantry-sanctioned Circle of Magi or any Dalish clan. Claiming that he is able to help the sole survivor of the Divine Conclave's explosion and the suspiciously glowing mark on their hand with the use of healing magic and minor wards, he is granted permission to study the survivor and one of the smaller rifts in order to find a way to seal the Breach. He later helps the survivor seal a small rift shortly after their meeting, and then follows them to the Temple itself to close the first and largest rift, which he theorizes would stabilize the Breach.

After the survivor assumes the role of the Inquisitor and successfully enlists the help of either the mages or the templars, Solas provides assistance with closing the Breach itself. Following the destruction of the Inquisition's base in Haven by Corypheus, the perpetrator of the Breach, Solas explains that the orb that Corypheus wields is meant to channel ancient magics and of elven origin. He worries that if the orb's origin were to be revealed, it may have negative consequences for the reputation of the elven people. He then guides the Inquisitor to Skyhold, a disused fortress located in the Frostback Mountains that the Inquisition could claim as its new headquarters.

When the Inquisitor finally defeats Corypheus and stops him from opening another rift, with the orb being damaged permanently in the process, a distraught Solas laments the destruction of the orb as the loss of yet another elven artifact. He disappears shortly afterwards without a trace. In the post-credits scene it is revealed that Solas is Fen'Harel, an ancient being who is a member of the elven pantheon of gods, and a recurring trickster figure in Dragon Age lore.

==== Trespasser ====
In the midst of investigating a Qunari plot to invade Thedas, two years after the defeat of Corypheus, the Inquisitor encounters several elven ruins and learns that the elven pantheon of deities, the Evanuris, were in fact extremely powerful mages as opposed to being divine beings. The Inquisitor eventually encounters the Viddasala, the leader of the Qunari plot, and learns that agents supposedly working for Fen'Harel have been disrupting the Qunari plot; concurrently, the Inquisitor is losing control of the Anchor, threatening their life. The Inquisitor foils the plot and follows the Viddasala into the Eluvian network to confront Solas, despite the Anchor growing increasingly out of control.

After petrifying the Viddasala, Solas calms the Anchor and explains his motivations to the Inquisitor. He confesses to being Fen'Harel, who led a rebellion against the Evanuris after they became corrupt and abused their power. He created the Veil to seal away the Evanuris after they murdered Mythal, sundering the physical world and the Fade permanently, and in doing so dooming the civilization of the ancient elves to collapse due to its dependency on magic. Remorseful over his direct role in the downfall of his people, Solas now plans to unmake the Veil he created millennia ago and restore the ancient elven world by reuniting the physical world and the Fade, being fully aware and regretful that this act may potentially destroy the world in its present state and killing countless lives in the process. He also admits to engineering the events which led to the Breach, albeit inadvertently; he arranged for Corypheus to obtain his orb, anticipating that the ancient darkspawn would unlock it on his behalf as he had awakened from millennia of slumber in the Fade and was too weak as a result. Anticipating that Corypheus would destroy himself in the subsequent explosion. Solas intended to retrieve the orb and use the Anchor to achieve his goal. Realizing later that Corypheus survived the orb's destructive power, he joined the Inquisition to guide the organization into defeating him and his forces. Solas also reveals that he has double agents working within the Inquisition and he deliberately allowed the Qunari's Dragon's Breath plot to be discovered so that the Inquisitor may discover and thwart it. He then amputates the Inquisitor's arm to prevent the Anchor from killing them and leaves.

Upon returning to the Winter Palace in Orlais, the Inquisitor either disbands the Inquisition or reforms the organization into a smaller peacekeeping force to serve directly under Divine Victoria, risking weaker efforts against Solas or further infiltration in their ranks respectively. Due to Solas' familiarity with the workings of the Inquisition, the Inquisitor resolves to recruit new allies who are beyond his sphere of influence. An epilogue reveals that, following the failure of the Viddasala's plot, many elven individuals across Thedas have disappeared.

=== Dragon Age: The Veilguard ===
During the opening sequence of events, the player protagonist Rook along with Varric and Harding pursue Solas in the Tevinter capital city of Minrathous, attempting to stop Solas from destroying the Veil. They then locate Solas in the forest of Arlathan, capital of the ancient elven empire. Rook disrupts Solas' ritual to destroy the Veil, which releases two ancient elven gods tied to the Veil – Elgar'nan and Ghilan'nain. Solas is imprisoned within the Fade and bound to Rook via a blood connection made during the ritual; Rook learns that Elgar'nan and Ghilan'nain plan to harness the Blight out of revenge for Solas rebelling against their rise to power and subsequently imprisoning them within the Veil. The protagonist and their companions take up residence within the "Lighthouse", Solas' former base of operations within the Fade, and recover the lyrium dagger used by Solas during the ritual. Rook sets out to stop Elgar'nan and Ghilan'nain. At various points, the protagonist is able to meditate in order to discuss the unfolding events with Solas as Elgar'nan and Ghilan'nain wreak havoc across Thedas.

Throughout the game, the protagonist has the opportunity to recover wolf statuettes which are tied to Solas' memories. Rook and their companions relive various military actions undertaken by Fen'Harel during the rebellion. After being given a statuette by the Inquisitor, Rook can place what they've collected around the Lighthouse in front of murals which depict Solas' regrets. Each statuette triggers a memory which Rook and their companions observe. These regrets reveal that the first elves were originally spirits who harvested lyrium from the Titans to manifest their physical forms; Mythal convinced Solas, who was once a spirit of Wisdom, to transition despite his concerns. Solas then supported Mythal in the war against the Titans leading to the creation of a lyrium dagger which they used to cut the Titans off from their dreams; this severing led to the creation of the Blight which they seal away. At the end of the war, Solas breaks from Mythal when she decides to join the other Evanuris in elevating themselves as gods over the elven people leading to Fen'Harel's rebellion. During the rebellion, Solas informs Mythal that the Evanuris unsealed the Blight in an attempt to empower themselves further. Following Mythal's murder, Solas imprisons both the Evanuris and the Blight in what Rook and their companions recognize as the Black City described in the Andrastian faith; something went wrong during his ritual leading to the creation of the Veil. His last regret shows Solas taking what was left of Mythal's power from Flemeth. Rook and the companions realize that all of his regrets revolve around Mythal. Following this, Morrigan puts Rook on the path to another fragment of Mythal to gain her aid.

After Ghilan'nain is killed, Solas betrays Rook and entraps them within the Fade prison, recovering the lyrium dagger. Rook escapes with the aid of their companions, learning that Varric was killed by Solas and that Solas had used blood magic to alter Rook's memory of the event; the team also created a duplicate lyrium dagger. Elgar'nan retreats to Minrathous with Solas in pursuit. With the aid of their remaining allies, Rook and the team break through the fortified defenses. After being given the lyrium dagger by Solas, Rook learns that killing Elgar'nan will collapse the Veil since an elven god must be bound to the Veil to uphold it. After Rook kills Elgar'nan and his Archdemon, Solas again attempts to collapse the Veil. However, Solas instead ends up bound to Veil to prevent it from collapsing – Rook can force Solas' binding to the Veil by fighting him, by tricking Solas with the duplicate dagger or by sacrificing themself; otherwise, with the aid of Mythal, Rook can peacefully convince Solas to stop the ritual and voluntarily bind himself out of atonement. During the redemption path, if the Inquisitor was in a romantic relationship with Solas during Inquisition and was influenced by Rook to be willing to reunite with Solas, then the Inquisitor will voluntarily join Solas in his imprisonment.

== Promotion ==
Solas has been the focus for much of the media coverage pertaining to information released by BioWare about the fourth instalment of the Dragon Age video game series. His "Dread Wolf" sobriquet, and associated imagery is the focus of a sixty-second promotional trailer released by BioWare during the 5th annual The Game Awards show in December 2018. On social media, this teaser was paired with the hashtag "#TheDreadWolfRises". On June 2, 2022, the upcoming Dragon Age 4 title was announced as Dragon Age: Dreadwolf, after his sobriquet, with Solas being advertised as the game's antagonist. The press release stated that "using Solas's namesake no doubt suggests a spectrum of endless possibilities on where things may go. [...] If you're new to Dragon Age, you have no need to worry about not having met our antagonist just yet. He'll properly introduce himself when the time is right".

In June 2024, the game was retitled Dragon Age: The Veilguard. BioWare explained that the titular Dread Wolf remains part of the game, however, the updated title is a stronger reflection of the game's focus. Game Informer highlighted that, in the Veilguard demo, the protagonist interrupts Solas while he is in the midst of a ritual which traps Solas in the Fade while freeing two other blighted Elven gods; the protagonist and their companions then take over Solas' realm in the Fade known as the Lighthouse and turn it into their base for the game.

== Reception ==
=== Inquisition ===
Solas' bald visage become associated with that of an egg or egghead by Dragon Age fandom. Patricia Hernandez of Kotaku was fascinated by the plot twist in the post-credit scene of Inquisition which reveals his true identity. She observed that the reveal was a subject of intense discussion by Dragon Age fandom on social media at the time. She concludes that "the ending is a cliffhanger, and a damn good one at that". Kat Brewster from IGN called Solas "the dear elven pal we love to hate and hate to love", and his reveal "true BioWare trickery". Hayes Madsen, for Inverse, thought the Fen'Harel reveal was an "emotionally crushing twist" and that "suddenly, so many details from across the game start to make sense" since there were "many signs that something wasn't quite right with Solas". Madsen commented that what makes Solas' plan to destroy the Veil "especially harrowing" is that the character does not "reveal his plan with glee, but rather solemn despair". Madsen also opined that the character has "some of the biggest character development" in the game as Solas fails "to hold everyone at arm's length" and instead builds "an attachment to the Inquisitor and other party members".

Academic René Reinhold Schallegger wrote that Solas "acquires aspects of Milton's Lucifer in Paradise Lost" as players uncover the details "behind the religious legends: Solas locked away mages who had claimed godhood". He noted that by removing "those who would use their knowledge to rule", Solas has "condemned his people to slavery and near extinction". Vanessa Villarreal, in the book Critical Hits: Writers Playing Video Games, highlighted how the themes around Elvhenan and memory in Inquisition "hit different" as "a descendant of indigenous Mexican farm workers" whose indigeneity and family history "have been totally obliterated" – "Solas's anxiety over restoring elven memory is recognizable to me as a kind of postcolonial haunting", noting that she understands Solas, who has witnessed "human mages study the elven history their kind obliterated", and "his rage". Villarreal wrote that "Solas can be read as a tragic antihero who only sabotages and betrays those he loves because he is always opposed to the abuse of power, willing to sacrifice the world for the elves in order to restore Elvhenan and give the land back to its original people".

Gita Jackson from Kotaku dislikes the character on a personal level, but acknowledges him as a complex, well-written character who felt real which she thought contributed to his popularity. Jackson opined, "Solas is one of the best-written characters in video games. It's hard for me to think of a character whose loathsome worldview is so well developed, who, even when he's on your side, manages to be a complete piece of shit about everything. He is a such a great character that I want to strangle that dude with my bare hands". She commented that "in some twisted way, my hatred of Solas makes me a fan, inasmuch as I hope he comes back for later games and I can tell him how I really feel. I empathize with Solas. I truly understand why he is so condescending, thinks he knows the solution to everything, is dismissive of other points of view, and is a massive racist". She enjoyed that an Inquisition scene gave the option of punching "Solas in the face". In an opinion rebuttal piece to Jackson's article about Solas, Angela D. Mitchell of The Fandomentals found the character "too complex, too trapped, and too tragic" for her to despise. Mitchell opined that Jackson "praises his complexity, yet the entire essay ignores that complexity and paints him as an egotistical, two-dimensional tool, disregarding the moments in which he actually demonstrates humility, compassion, or self-awareness". Mitchell commented, "I like that Solas begins in arrogance—it's appropriate and ironic, especially as his journey—by the time of his final, crucial meeting with Flemeth—ends in penitence, guilt and grief" and that "Solas knows his path can only end in death and lonely darkness".

==== Romance ====
The Dragon Age fandom dubbed the romantic pairing between Solas and the elven Inquisitor, whose surname is Lavellan, as Solavellan. Alison Bell from Videogamer.com believed that the potential romantic relationship between Solas and the Inquisitor is the best written romance in a video game so far, although she compared it to that of a Shakespearean tragedy: "histrionic, ruinous, and, in the long term, one or both of you is probably going to die". Ash Parrish, for The Verge, commented that Solas was initially "one of the least interesting of companions" until the endgame reveal and that "despite his overtly asshole behavior, there was a quiet confidence about him that some players found attractive enough to want to romance him". Villarreal stated that the Solas-Inquisitor romance "is the most popular" in the game, noting it has "big 'I can fix him' energy", and that its "tragic, star-crossed-lovers storyline" complicates "the finality of Solas's Ragnarök plot". Academic Christine Tomlinson, in a journal article on player emotional investment in romantic video game narratives, highlighted Solas as an example of a romanceable video game character who is "designed to hurt the player" and this type of narrative subversion, after players have built an attachment, leads to an "ultimate shattering of their hopes and expectations when their desires are denied. Solas is most often discussed in this regard in both forums and interviews and he seems to have had a haunting effect on many players who became invested, only to be suddenly abandoned by their romantic interest".

Tomlinson noted that players have reveled "in the heart-ache and emotional pain imposed by this story" which is considered an "extremely difficult romance" – "contrary to the often assumed motivations for playing these games, Solas does not have an enticing sex scene, nor many deeply sweet moments and, in fact, unlike most other romantic options, he is designed to always leave the player without warning or preparation". Tomlinson commented that an "easy romance is not necessarily the most enticing" for players and that the Solas romance is "considered a beautiful, but excruciating experience". Villarreal highlighted the final romance scene in Inquisition where Solas reveals the origins of the Inquisitor's tattoos as slave markings which "he offers to delicately, lovingly remove them with magic before mysteriously dumping you" and then he returns in Trespasser to "break your heart again" as Solas' love for both the elven people and the romanced Inquisitor is destructive. Villarreal also commented on the questions raised around Solas having the most rigid romantic preferences in the game, limited to only a female elf player character, and that the interpretation of these "preferences depends on how you want to read Solas–genocidal villain or rebel liberator".

=== Veilguard ===
In her analysis of a promotional trailer for the upcoming game released in December 2018, Brewster remarked that "The Dread Wolf had been hiding in tapestries and lore all since Origins". Parrish, for The Verge in June 2022, wrote that, "Solas, for a lot of players, was an ally, a trusted friend, and even a romantic partner. Then, he betrayed them, helping them save the world only to turn around and promise its destruction for anybody who doesn't look like him." Parrish highlighted that the title reveal for the fourth game – Dragon Age: Dreadwolf – was "exciting for a lot of fans" because it not only makes Solas the antagonist of the next game but also makes the game a direct sequel unlike previous instalments in the franchise. Parrish stated that she takes "great, gleeful pleasure" in the idea of getting revenge on behalf of the Inquisitor who she assumes will not be the protagonist of the next game. Madsen, for Inverse in November 2022, called it "unprecedented" to have "a vitally important party member" become suddenly "the franchise's main villain" and thought it would "be fascinating to see how BioWare continues to develop a character that players have so much history with, and how the studio convinces them to still fight against him".

Madsen, now for Rolling Stone in October 2024, opined that Solas is "arguably a second protagonist" of Veilguard, with the game focusing on "the choices he made, how he's altered the world, and how your journey as Rook mirrors that". Madsen explained that Solas' "influence and spirit can be felt in every part of Veilguard's narrative, and it's a fascinating way to approach a character, especially in how the player's interpretation of his choices color interactions with Solas". Matt Purslow of IGN agreed that Solas takes "up considerable space" in the game but felt Solas was oddly "relegated to the position of fantasy Hannibal Lecter" where he offers advice in Rook's dreams instead of becoming the main villain as promised in Trespasser. Purslow commented that "despite his shift from villain to condescending informant, the story is still dedicated to him in a manner that never feels like a true fit for a game that elsewhere is so clearly attempting to be a fresh start rather than a direct sequel" and felt that Veilguard would have been "better for cutting Solas loose entirely" as his "fate feels divorced from the story that established him". Malindy Hetfeld, for The Guardian, commented that the "comically evil" new villainous gods "are a disappointment compared with the compelling character of Solas, who is, after all, right there". Stacey Henley of TheGamer similarly argued that Veilguard, to its detriment, focuses on "two evil gods who like being evil because they're so evil" instead of focusing on Solas, "a character we know and respect, with clear motivations and nuance who leaves room to be redeemed".

Parrish, for The Verge in November 2024, commented that going into Veilguard she wanted to kill Solas, however, "when it was finally time to fight this asshole for all the grief he put me and my two characters through – I didn't. BioWare crafted his story arc in a way that didn't soften his actions as villain backstories typically do, but in a way that I felt compelled to make a different choice". Parrish noted that she made a choice to "end the thousand-year cycle of violence that kicked off the game in the first place" and after a decade "of making jokes about 'cracking' Solas' bald egghead to scramble his brains for my breakfast, I let him go and it hurt". Similarly, Samantha Puc of The Mary Sue commented that "as a self-proclaimed Solas hater, I went into Veilguard wanting to fight him to the death", however, "after finishing my first playthrough, I have far more complex feelings about the Dread Wolf and an even deeper desire to spend hundreds of hours more in Thedas unpacking those feelings and deep-diving into the lore". Kenneth Shepard of Kotaku highlighted that for Dragon Age Day, in December 2024, BioWare released Veilguard player choice statistics where 72% of players took the redemption path for Solas and of those, 43% "had an Inquisitor who romanced Solas and joined him in The Fade". In terms of Solas' other ending options, 17% "chose to trick him", 8% "chose to take him on in a fight", and 3% had the sacrifice ending "which ends in Rook sacrificing themself to ensure Solas is bound to The Veil".

Josh Cotts of GameRant thought that the "Regrets of the Dread Wolf" side quest in Veilguard was "one of the best and arguably most important side quests in the game" as it "centers around Solas, his relationship with Mythal, and his past regrets". He was surprised it was not "a main story quest" but instead "reduced to mere side content" despite its narrative importance. Cotts opined that the backstory revealed in the quest "arguably makes it an essential part, especially for newcomers to the series or those who have never delved too deeply into Dragon Age lore". Shepard similarly opined that this questline was "probably the most important in the game, if not the entirety of BioWare's fantasy RPG series", as the depictions of Solas' regrets "include some of the biggest lore drops BioWare has ever put in a Dragon Age game, and fundamentally change our understanding of this world". Amer Sawan of CBR commented that the memories revealed in this quest show the character's "gradual transition from an idealistic hero who wanted to liberate his people, to a more jaded rebel who simply wants to punish the gods" due to "centuries of warfare against the increasingly depraved Evanuris". Sawan noted that it also showcases Mythal "at the heart of Solas' regrets, being the main motivator for his biggest mistakes, and depending on the point of view, allocating some of the blame for his deeds to Mythal herself". Sarah-Jane Simpson, for Screen Rant, argued that skipping "Regrets of the Dread Wolf" means "missing out on perhaps the best ending for the game" and criticized its placement as a side quest. Simpson highlighted the lore reveals which not only tie "in wonderfully with companions such as Harding and Bellara" but also elevate Solas "from a simple villain to a truly complex and misguided character". Simpson opined that "the memories do a fantastic job of explaining Solas' motivations, far better than the main plot, and give glimpses of who he was before war and conflict twisted him into the hardened character met in Dragon Age: Inquisition".

== See also ==
- Elves in fiction
- List of fictional tricksters
