= Dragon Age: Inquisition – Jaws of Hakkon =

- Developer: BioWare
- Publisher: Electronic Arts
- Series: Dragon Age
- Engine: Frostbite 3
- Platforms: Microsoft Windows; Xbox One; PlayStation 3; PlayStation 4; Xbox 360
- Release: Windows, Xbox One; March 24, 2015; PS3, PS4, Xbox 360; May 26, 2015
- Genre: Action role-playing
- Mode: Single-player

Dragon Age: Inquisition – Jaws of Hakkon is a downloadable content (DLC) pack developed by BioWare and published by Electronic Arts for the 2014 action role-playing video game Dragon Age: Inquisition. It was initially released for Xbox One and Microsoft Windows through Electronic Arts' digital distribution platform Origin, on March 24, 2015, and for PlayStation 3, PlayStation 4, and Xbox 360 on May 26, 2015. The pack follows the Inquisition's exploration of the Frostback Basin, an overgrown wilderness area populated by Avvar barbarian tribes and the site of an ancient Tevinter fortress, to determine the fate of the last Inquisitor and the powerful dragon he hunted.

Jaws of Hakkon is the first major single-player narrative DLC pack released for Dragon Age: Inquisition. It received mixed reviews from video game publications, with critics praising the in-game environments, combat difficulty, well-written side characters, and the lore and history introduced by the pack's narrative, while the main narrative's lack of flair and quality of the pack's quests were met with a less enthusiastic reception.

== Gameplay ==
Jaws of Hakkon is a downloadable content (DLC) pack for the 2014 action role-playing video game Dragon Age: Inquisition. The player assumes the role of the Inquisitor, the leader of the organization known as the Inquisition, whose goal is to quell the civil unrest in the world of Thedas. The Inquisitor is viewed by some as the 'chosen one', as they have a 'Mark' on their hand capable of closing the Breach. In Jaws of Hakkon, the Inquisition's ambassador Josephine Montilyet is contacted by an academic named Bram Kemric, who sets the Inquisition on a quest to discover ancient relics and find out what happened to Ameridan, the Inquisitor's predecessor who vanished in the Frostback Basin about 800 years before the events of Inquisition.

Through the war table in Skyhold, the Inquisition's base of operations, players access the downloadable content pack by selecting a mission marker which is added at the base of the map called Investigate Frostback Basin, which expends eight power points. The Frostback Basin area has a recommended minimum character level of 20 and is designed to be a late or post-game experience. Combat is similar to the main game, which focuses on the player's ability to prepare, position, and form a cohesive team with their party members. The Inquisition encounters the friendly Avvar of Stone-Bear Hold and comes into conflict with the titular Jaws of Hakkon, a hostile Avvar faction also known as the Hakkonites. A fanatical cult who worship the Avvar god of war, Hakkon Wintersbreath, the Hakkonites' plan to revive their god and summon him into Thedas is linked to the mystery of Ameridan's fate, leader of the original Inquisition who was last known to have fought a great dragon in the region.

== Development and release ==
Concept art of Alamarri tribesmen, who are the ancestors of the Avvar. The design for Jaws of Hakkon's titular antagonists share a similar visual language.

On March 23, 2015, BioWare announced the imminent release of Jaws of Hakkon. IGN reported on further details about the narrative pack, noting that the Inquisition may "unearth an ancient secret that could destroy the world" as part of the DLC pack's narrative. The pack adds new enemies types as well as armor and weapons for the player to collect, and expands the world of Thedas with a large playable area containing mountains, forests, and rivers. Then-creative director at Bioware, Mike Laidlaw, commented that BioWare was humbled by Inquisition's positive reception but intended to support the game with further DLC content, and said "We hope the new DLC speaks to our dedication of growing Inquisition with meaningful and exciting new content for our fans, new and old." New dialogue was recorded for the main cast of companion characters, both during missions and for general party "banter".

Jaws of Hakkon was initially released on Xbox One, and Windows PC through Origin on March 24, 2015. The DLC pack's timed-exclusive release for Xbox One and Microsoft Windows was part of a special deal between Microsoft and Electronic Arts, which generated some controversy: Inquisition executive producer Mark Darrah pleaded with fans of the PlayStation home video game console to be patient via his Twitter account, and BioWare general manager Aaryn Flynn expressed hope that fans would not boycott Jaws of Hakkon following the pack's eventual release for other platforms due to the developer's exclusivity deal with Microsoft. Jaws of Hakkon was eventually released for PlayStation 3, PlayStation 4, and Xbox 360 on May 26, 2015. On July 6, 2015, Electronic Arts announced that future DLCs will not be released for PlayStation 3 and Xbox 360, making Jaws of Hakkon the only narrative DLC pack for Inquisition to be released in the aforementioned platforms.

== Reception ==
Reception

Aggregate score
Aggregator	Score
Metacritic	74/100 (PC); 70/100 (XONE)

Review scores
Publication	Score
Eurogamer	7/10
GameSpot	7/10
Hardcore Gamer	8/10
IGN	7.5/10
PC Gamer (US)	80/100

According to the review aggregator Metacritic, the Microsoft Windows and Xbox One versions of Jaws of Hakkon received "mixed or average reviews" from video game publications. Several critics praised the beautiful and varied environments, challenging gameplay, and Scout Harding's more prominent role in Jaws of Hakkon's narrative.

Reviewing the Xbox One version, Lucy O'Brien from IGN noted that there's a genuine charm to Jaws of Hakkon due to the Frostback Basin's visually pleasant environments, a light tone underpinned by a dry sense of humour, and the upturn in combat difficulty compared to the base game. She considered the Frostback Basin to be "a worthwhile addition to Inquisition’s enormous map, although not an entirely consequential one", and expressed a wish for the next installment to have less over-familiar quests and more substance in terms of narrative story and gameplay. GameSpot's Austin Walker quibbled that Jaws of Hakkon's lacks the cinematic flair of the base game's storytelling, and that some of the pack's content can be "bloated" and somewhat boring. Though Walker scored the pack an above average rating, he concluded that the pack provides new perspective on the series' lore and fondly remembers many aspects of his Jaws of Hakkon playthrough: this includes the Frostback Basin's environments; the wittiness of Svarah Sun-Hair, the leader of the Stone-Bear tribe; the religious symbolism and iconography employed in the pack's narrative; confronting legendary foes; and interacting with some of his favorite characters in video games.

The Italian edition of Eurogamer scored the pack 7 out of 10. In his review of Jaws of Hakkon published in the English edition of Eurogamer, senior news editor Tom Phillips summarized the pack as "an interesting - if not essential - slice of extra Dragon Age lore, with an engaging new environment to explore." He commented that "for a DLC that promises a lot of story, some of it can seem fairly mundane", and observed that Jaws of Hakkon's "story stakes" never felt like they can reach or outdo that of the main campaign's narrative. He praised the "well written and realised" side characters introduced in the pack, such as the "plucky" Professor Kemric and the "Viking-like" Stone-Bear tribe, as well as the script, which is "peppered with humour and in-jokes for fans to smile at".

Chris Thursten from PC Gamer compared Jaws of Hakkon to BioWare's previous DLC offerings, noting that it is most similar in terms of quality and relevance to Mass Effect 2's Overlord DLC; Thursten opined that Jaws of Hakkon falls short of being a substantial, campaign-quality new chapter and a mandatory part of the experience, but neither is it a mediocre expansion that is padded with filler content which is entirely missable. Thursten concluded that Jaws of Hakkon is "beautiful, well-written, and with an exciting finish". Stacey Johnson from Hardcore Gamer found Jaws of Hakkon to be an overall enjoyable experience. She commented that "the humor that has come to be a key component of any BioWare game shines through here to great effect", and that Ameridan's story "is a brilliant addition to the lore of the series, working especially well with Inquisition’s themes of duty, religion, and companionship". She recommended it for "players looking to prolong their game or for an excuse to dive back into Thedas", but noted that players who expect the pack's narrative to influence the main story of the base game would be disappointed.
