= Dragon Age: Inquisition =

2014 video game

- Developer: BioWare
- Publisher: Electronic Arts
- Director: Mike Laidlaw
- Producers: Scylla Costa; Pat LaBine; Cameron Lee; Kyle Scott
- Programmer: Jacques Lebrun
- Artist: Matthew Goldman
- Writer: David Gaider
- Composer: Trevor Morris
- Series: Dragon Age
- Engine: Frostbite 3
- Platforms: PlayStation 3; PlayStation 4; Windows; Xbox 360; Xbox One
- Release: NA: November 18, 2014; EU: November 20, 2014; AU: November 21, 2014
- Genre: Action role-playing
- Modes: Single-player, multiplayer

Dragon Age: Inquisition is a 2014 action role-playing video game developed by BioWare and published by Electronic Arts. The third major game in the Dragon Age franchise, Inquisition is the sequel to Dragon Age II (2011). The story follows a player character known as the Inquisitor on a journey to settle the civil unrest in the continent of Thedas and close a mysterious tear in the sky called the "Breach", which is unleashing dangerous demons upon the world. Dragon Age: Inquisition's gameplay is similar to its predecessors, although it consists of several semi-open worlds for players to explore. Players control the Inquisitor or their companions mainly from a third-person perspective, although a traditional role-playing game top-down camera angle is also available.

The release of Dragon Age II was met with a mixed reception from players who lamented the loss of the complexity of the first game, Dragon Age: Origins (2009). BioWare sought to address player feedback for Dragon Age II as a major goal, which influenced the design decisions of its sequel. Ultimately, BioWare wanted the third Dragon Age game to combine the elements of the first two games in the series. Having begun development in 2011, BioWare used EA DICE's Frostbite 3 engine to power the game, though this created many development challenges for the team. They had to crunch extensively during development, and because of hardware limitations on older generation consoles, several gameplay features had to be cut. Trevor Morris composed the game's soundtrack, replacing Inon Zur, the composer used for the previous games.

Officially announced in September 2012 as Dragon Age III: Inquisition, the game was released worldwide in November 2014 for PlayStation 3, PlayStation 4, Windows, Xbox 360, and Xbox One. Upon release, the game received positive reviews from critics, who praised it for its exploration, combat, writing, characters, and customization. The game received some criticism for its filler content, technical issues, tactical view, and aspects of its narrative. Commercially, it was one of the most successful games released by BioWare. It was awarded numerous accolades and nominated for more, including Game of the Year by several gaming publications. Several narrative downloadable content (DLC) packs were released to support Inquisition. A sequel, Dragon Age: The Veilguard, was released on October 31, 2024.

== Gameplay ==
Dragon Age: Inquisition is an action role-playing game similar to its predecessors. At the beginning of the game, the player chooses a race for their player character: human, dwarf, elf, or Qunari, a playable race for the first time in the series. Players customize the Inquisitor's physical appearance and gender, among other things. Players can access a cloud-based online interactive story creator called Dragon Age Keep, and detail the major plots of the previous two Dragon Age games and import a world state in Inquisition without requiring replay of the initial games.

The game has a semi-open world structure, as the world is broken up into several sections, which players can freely explore. To allow players to navigate the game's world faster, mounts, creatures players can ride, are introduced. The various regions that make up the game world do not scale in level, meaning players can be too weak or strong for the enemies found in a region. In each hub world, players can complete side activities such as sealing Fade rifts and capturing keeps or forts, and establishing camps, which are used to provide fast travel and resupply points. Performing these acts will grant players resource points in Influence, which can be used to unlock global upgrades for the Inquisition (called Inquisition perks), and Power, which is required for progressing the story and unlocking new areas. In addition, the player can complete side missions, fetch quests, collect magical shards, and solve Astrarium puzzles. Players can also collect codex entries, allowing them to have a deeper understanding about the world of Thedas. At Skyhold, the Inquisition's base of operations, players can access the war table to unlock locations, receive rewards, gain influence and/or progress the story. As the Inquisitor, players deploy agents and troops of the Inquisition to complete various text-based operations through their primary advisors, which influences the rewards and time requirements of the effort undertaken.

In Inquisition, players can interact with numerous non-playable characters, some of whom can be recruited as agents for the Inquisition. A dialogue wheel offers several dialogue options for the player to select. Depending on the Inquisitor's race and class, additional dialogue options are available for players to select. Throughout the game, the Inquisitor needs to make important decisions that might change the state of Thedas and have long-lasting consequences. Companions will sometimes approve or disapprove of the Inquisitor's decision. At Skyhold, the Inquisitor can talk to their companions and learn more about their backstory, and initiate their personal quests. Among the nine companions, who assist players in battle and three advisors, eight can be romanced. Some of these party members can decide whether to fall in love with the Inquisitor based on their gender and race. In addition, the Inquisitor can "judge" certain people on their actions and decide their fate at Skyhold.

=== Combat ===
In this gameplay screenshot, the Inquisitor is fighting the Fereldan Frostback, one of the game's ten optional high dragons, with companions Cassandra and Varric.

Players choose from three classes: warrior, mage, and rogue. Warriors are sword and heavy weapon wielders who can absorb a lot of damage from hostiles; rogues are equipped with either daggers or bows and arrows; and mages are practitioners of magic that can cast spells on enemies. Each class has their own stats and attributes. For instance, rogues may favor dexterity for critical hits, while strength is more important to warriors for inflicting powerful damage. Stamina or mana governs the use of active abilities. As the player character attacks hostile opponents, the whole team gains Focus, which can be used to unleash special abilities. Combat in Inquisition focuses on the player's ability to form a cohesive team with their party members. During combat, players can switch to control other party members, while artificial intelligence (AI) will take control of the Inquisitor and the remaining members in the party. This action-oriented system follows the player in a typical over-the-shoulder third-person style. Players can access the Tactics menu to modify the behaviors of the AI companions during combat. The player can also access Tactical View, which allows them to pause the game, assign locations and orders to the party members and then resume the game to see it played out. During the use of this combat system, the camera will be closer to that of a top-down perspective.

Killing enemies and completing quests earn players experience points (XP). Once the players have enough XP, the inquisitor will level up, which increases the player character's health and stats, and gives players skill points they can use to unlock new talents. Players can specialize their character further, which grants them specific abilities. At Skyhold's Undercroft, players can craft and customize armor or weapons from crafting recipes using the materials they have collected; rarer materials give the particular weapon or armor piece better attributes. Weapons and armor can be upgraded with accessories and enchanted with runes, which introduce new properties to the weapon on which they are inscribed. The inquisitor and party members can be equipped with accessories such as rings, amulets and belts, which can further alter the character's stats. Research items can be given to Skyhold's researchers, which can then provide players an XP and damage boost against the researched enemies. Players can customize their keeps, such as rebuilding a garden as a Chantry church or an herb garden. These upgrades have minor effects on the Inquisition's espionage, commerce or military capabilities.

Dragon Age: Inquisition introduces multiplayer, which BioWare describes as a "dungeon crawling experience". The game features a co-operative multiplayer mode which tasks players to play as an Agent of the Inquisition. Players have to play through levels, and fight against increasingly difficult AI. The mode can be played with three other players, or be completed solo. At launch, the game features three multiplayer campaigns and nine playable characters. This mode is completely separate from the main campaign. As a result, the progress made by the player in the multiplayer mode does not carry over to the campaign. Players can upgrade and craft items and unlock new characters in the multiplayer mode. Players can purchase an in-game currency called Platinum to speed up unlocking new characters. Two multiplayer DLCs introduced additional features: Destruction added new routes to existing multiplayer maps, armor sets, and wild creatures that roam the battlefield and attack both friend and foe. Dragonslayer adds the Fereldan Castle multiplayer map, High Dragons as enemies, and three new characters, including Isabela, a companion from Dragon Age II.

== Synopsis ==
=== Setting ===
Following the explosion of the Kirkwall Chantry in Dragon Age II and the events of the 2011 novel Dragon Age: Asunder, the Circle of Magi has gone rogue and the Templar Order secedes from the Chantry to wage their own war on the world's mages. The Mage-Templar war is temporarily halted by a Conclave near the village of Haven in the Kingdom of Ferelden, where Divine Justinia V, leader of the Chantry, has orchestrated a peace conference prior to the events of the game. The 2014 tie-in prequel novel to Inquisition, Dragon Age: The Masked Empire by the game's writing team member Trick Weekes, details the civil war which broke out in Ferelden's neighbouring country of Orlais between the loyalists of the ruling Empress Celene and a powerful noble faction led by her cousin Grand Duke Gaspard de Chalons, as well as the rise of a neutral elven faction led by Celene's handmaiden Briala.

Returning characters from the previous games include Cullen and Leliana serving as the Inquisition's military commander and spymaster respectively, and Cassandra Pentaghast and Varric who serve as party companions. New companions introduced in the game include Solas, an elven apostate mage well-versed in the Fade and its spirit denizens; Blackwall, a lone Free Marcher Grey Warden; Sera, an elven thief and member of a secret society called the Friends of Red Jenny; The Iron Bull, a Qunari warrior leading a mercenary company called the Bull's Chargers, and agent of the Ben-Hassrath; Vivienne, the official enchanter to the Imperial Court of Orlais; Dorian Pavus, a mage from the Tevinter Imperium; and Cole, a mysterious being who is first introduced in Asunder. Josephine Montilyet, an Antivan noblewoman and diplomat, serves as the Inquisition's ambassador. Hawke, the protagonist of Dragon Age II, and Morrigan, a companion from Dragon Age: Origins, serve as important allies to the Inquisitor.

=== Plot ===
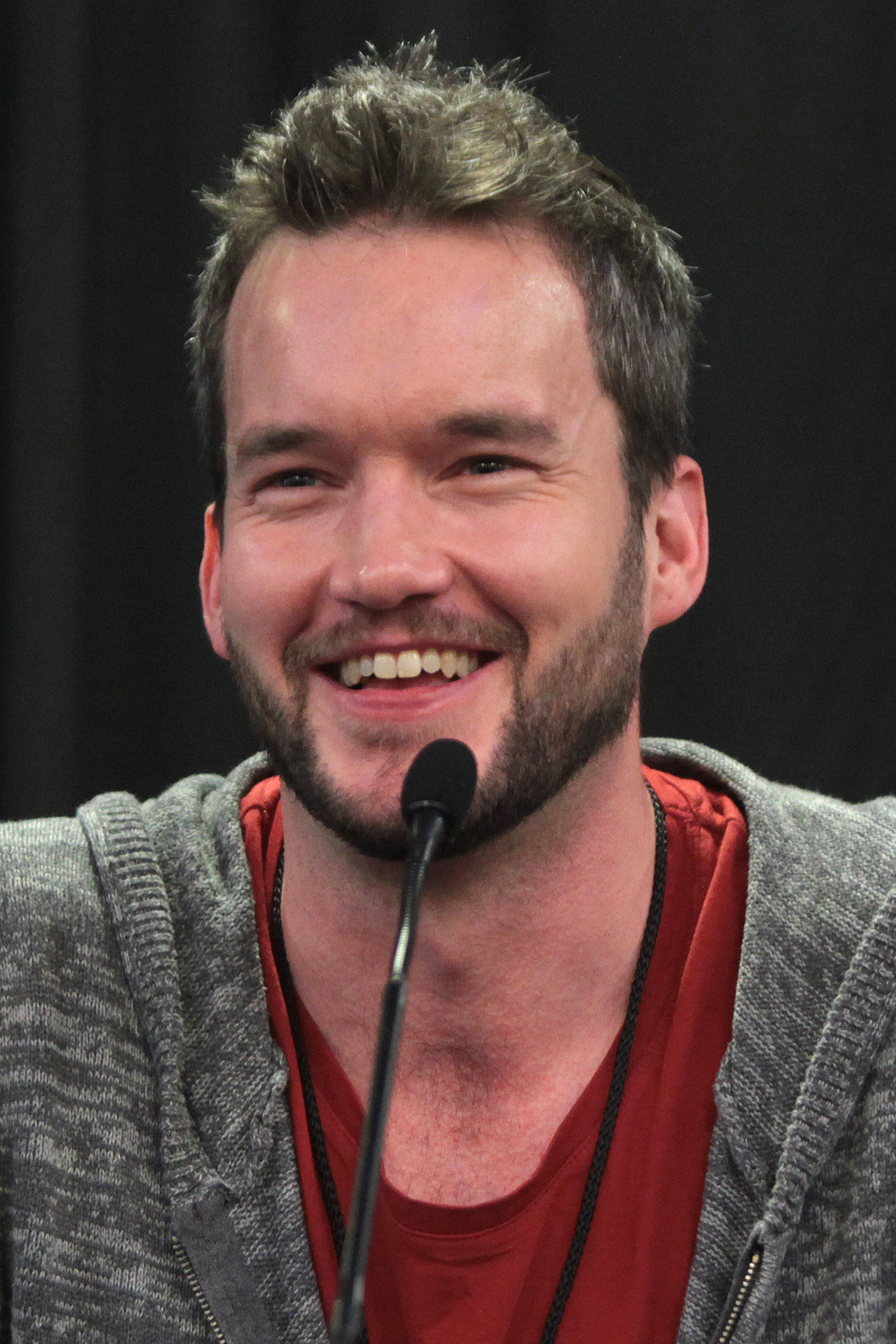
Gareth David-Lloyd voiced Solas, an elven mage companion.

A massive explosion destroys the Conclave and creates a hole in the Veil — the metaphysical boundary between the physical world and the Fade, the world of spirits and demons — referred to as the "Breach". The only survivor of the blast is the player character, who emerges with a mark on their hand capable of closing rifts in the Veil that have sprung up in the Breach's wake, but who retains no memory of what happened. Witnesses claim the player character was ushered out of the Fade by a mysterious female figure, rumored to be the prophet Andraste, the historical Bride of the Maker.

After closing several rifts, the player character begins to be referred to as the "Herald of Andraste". With the Chantry effectively leaderless, Leliana and Cassandra Pentaghast invoke one of the Divine's last orders to re-establish the Inquisition, an organization originally formed to defend against the dangers of magic and heretics. After closing the Breach with help from rebel mages or remnants of the Templar Order, Haven is attacked by a force led by Corypheus, an ancient Darkspawn mage, who was responsible for opening the Breach. Aided by a dragon, Corypheus overcomes Haven's defences and confronts the Herald. Corypheus refers to the mark as "the Anchor", which he means to use to physically enter the Fade, with the goal of attaining apotheosis for himself. He attempts to remove the Anchor with a magical orb-shaped elven artifact, but the Herald sets off an avalanche, burying Haven and decimating Corypheus's army. Solas leads the survivors to the abandoned fortress of Skyhold, which becomes the Inquisition's new base of operations. The Herald is appointed as the Inquisitor, leader of the Inquisition.

With Hawke's assistance, the Inquisitor investigates the disappearance of the Grey Wardens and discovers they are being manipulated by Corypheus into raising an army of demons. During a battle against the Wardens, the Inquisitor enters the Fade and regains their memories, discovering that they obtained the Anchor at the Conclave after stumbling onto a ritual being carried out on Divine Justinia V by Corypheus, and then coming into contact with the orb. Either Hawke or their Grey Warden ally sacrifice themselves to help the others escape the Fade, after which the Inquisitor must either exile or recruit the remaining Wardens.

The Inquisitor also attends a ball at the Winter Palace in an attempt to resolve the ongoing Orlesian civil war and gain the assistance of Orlesian forces. Afterwards, the Empress' arcane advisor, Morrigan, joins the Inquisition as an Imperial liaison. She directs the Inquisitor to the Temple of Mythal to stop Corypheus from obtaining an Eluvian, an artifact which could enable him to enter the Fade. Inside the temple, either the Inquisitor or Morrigan gains the powers of the Well of Sorrows, a store of magical energies tied to the elven goddess Mythal. The party escapes Corypheus through the Eluvian, which shatters behind them. Mythal is later revealed to be Morrigan's mother, Flemeth; whoever drinks from the Well of Sorrows is the recipient of wisdom from previous servants of Mythal, but also binds them to her will. They discover that Corypheus' dragon is the key to stopping him, then confront Corypheus as he reopens the Breach and defeat him and his dragon, resealing the Breach permanently. In the process, the orb carried by Corypheus is irreversibly damaged. The Inquisition returns to Skyhold to celebrate their victory, while a dismayed Solas vanishes after recovering the device. An epilogue narrated by Morrigan details the outcomes of the Inquisitor's major decisions.

A post-credits scene shows a meeting between Flemeth and Solas, who is in fact the Dread Wolf Fen'Harel, a previously inactive deity figure and the original owner of the orb. Their conversation reveals that Solas is indirectly responsible for the events of Inquisition, as he had allowed the artifact to come into Corypheus' possession so that it could be unlocked on his behalf. He petrifies Flemeth and seemingly absorbs Mythal's power.

== Development ==
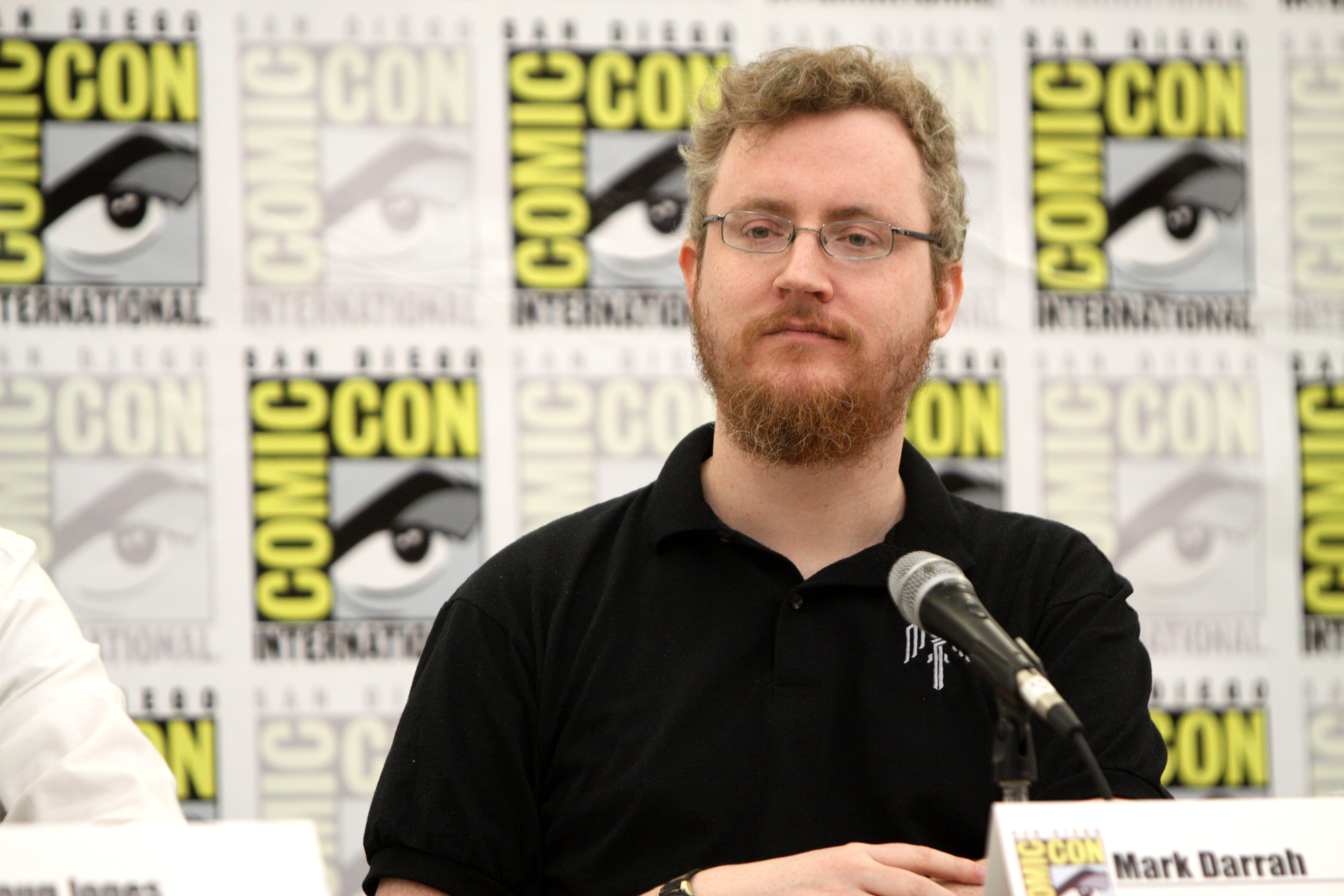
Mark Darrah, Inquisition's executive producer

Development for Dragon Age: Inquisition began in 2011. BioWare's biggest single-player video game at the time of its release, development for the project revolved around five core "design pillars": "story", "characters", "open world", "choices", and "personalise". The central idea for the game, namely that there would be an institution inspired by the historical Inquisition and the player character would be its leader, was intended originally to be the follow-up to Dragon Age: Origins, though its progress was halted completely when EA forced BioWare to rush the development of Dragon Age II. Conception of the game began in 2011; production began in 2012. Initially, the team had the choice to revisit Jade Empire (2006), or create a new intellectual property (IP). However, they were content to develop a new installment in the Dragon Age franchise as they believed it had more "pull" and consumer "awareness" than Jade Empire, and recognized that creating a new IP would be too large an undertaking. David Gaider returned as the game's lead writer, while Mike Laidlaw and Mark Darrah served as its creative director and executive producer, respectively. Jeremie Voillot and Michael Kent served as joint audio directors of Inquisition, reprising their similar roles from Dragon Age II.

The game cost "tens of millions" of dollars to develop. More than 200 people worked on it, including eight writers, 70 artists, 75 game-testers, and more than 30 actors.

=== Technology ===
“I think at launch we still didn't actually have all our tools working. We had our tools working enough."

— Mark Darrah on the challenges of using Frostbite 3 for Inquisition

While previous Dragon Age games used BioWare's own Eclipse game engine, it was not designed to handle features such as open world and multiplayer, and its renderer was not powerful enough to create great visuals. Publisher Electronic Arts also had a vision to use the same game engine for all its games. As a result, BioWare approached its sister studio DICE and used their Frostbite 3 engine, which was previously used to power the Battlefield games. As the BioWare team had never created games with the engine before, it began experimenting with its features with a multiplayer-based Dragon Age project named Blackfoot. Transitioning into Frostbite was a huge project for BioWare, and it had to cancel Exalted March, the last downloadable content pack originally planned for II in order to better manage its resources and manpower. As the team began working on Inquisition, they faced many development troubles because of the technical limitations of DICE's engine. Frostbite was initially designed for making first-person video games. It did not have features that could accommodate stats, game saving, conversations, and cutscenes, all of which are elements commonly found in a role-playing video game, and the team had to update the engine extensively to incorporate these features in Inquisition. It also cannot animate custom characters and quadrupeds. Many designers reported having a frustrating experience working with the Frostbite engine. John Epler, Inquisition's designer, called it "the worst tools experience" he had during his tenure at BioWare. The issue was made worse when DICE began incorporating new features on its own, meaning that the development build BioWare was working on was often not updated, causing it to become unstable.

While BioWare intended to release the game for PC, PlayStation 4 and Xbox One, EA worried that the popularity of mobile gaming would hinder game console sales, and forced BioWare to release the game for older hardware including PlayStation 3 and Xbox 360. The technical limitations of these older consoles created many development challenges. Many features that worked on more advanced platforms had to be removed as Laidlaw and Darrah wanted the game to be consistent across the five platforms. Laidlaw and Darrah demonstrated these features in a game demo at PAX Prime 2013. They included environmental destructibility and a war simulation system which tasked players to maintain the military strength around the Inquisition's strongholds. Laidlaw added these features were removed because they "were not fleshed out and proven enough" and might interrupt the flow of gameplay. In the book Blood, Sweat & Pixels by journalist Jason Schreier, Laidlaw and Darrah admitted that the gameplay in the PAX Prime demo was not real, and its sole purpose was to show transparency in light of Dragon Age II's divisive reception.

The technical challenges meant the game's development was behind schedule. Art director Matthew Goldman said of development, "basically we had to do new consoles, a new engine, new gameplay, build the hugest game that we've ever made, and build it to a higher standard than we ever did, with tools that don't exist". The game was unplayable during the first several years of development. Darrah later asked EA to delay the game for a year because of these development troubles, on the condition that BioWare incorporated more features into the game, such as multiple playable races. The problem was alleviated during the game's later stages of development, as BioWare and DICE managed to cooperate better, resulting in faster progress in 2014. However, the development team did not have sufficient time for development because the game had to ship in late 2014. As II was internally considered a misfire, Inquisition had to be a success to win back alienated fans. The team resorted to crunching extensively in late 2014.

The Frostbite engine helped the art team significantly in terms of productivity, as they were able to create a large variety of environments in a short time using the engine's art tools. Nevertheless, Director of Art and Animation Neil Thompson drew a comparison between BioWare's artists coming to grips with the intricacies of the Frostbite engine to European artists learning to master the challenges of realistic oil painting during the Northern Renaissance period when reflecting on his experiences leading the art direction for Inquisition. Ultimately, the adoption of new systems and technologies provided visual benchmarking for the game's iterations on next generation consoles. The project's game artists and animators drew inspiration from traditional art media, film, photography and architecture; at the same time, thematic consistency had to be maintained when dealing with multiple character factions due to the need to stay true to the intellectual property.

For Inquisition, where the game systems and tools had to be completely rebuilt as a result of the change to the Frostbite engine, BioWare had to construct an AI system that would work well in the larger combat environments of an open-world game; AI is typically iterated on between titles in multi-game franchises to provide a sense of continuity in development. According to gameplay engineer Sebastian Hanlon, BioWare leveraged the modular approach for constructing creature AI. The transition into an open world system for Inquisition not only necessitated rethinking an approach to enemy AI by Hanlon's team, they also had to ensure that players retain control over the flow of combat by refining the AI for the party members who are not directly controlled by the player to keep up with the action.

=== Gameplay ===
Dragon Age II received a lot of criticism for reusing environments, as the game was set almost entirely in the city-state of Kirkwall. To address the issue, BioWare management decided that Inquisition would have more open environments. BioWare added games such as The Elder Scrolls V: Skyrim, which the team was "checking out aggressively", would influence Inquisition. Darrah also remarked that BioWare games since Baldur's Gate II "have been getting progressively smaller", and that the goal for Inquisition was to bring back scale and exploration. The developers' goal for the project was to generate anywhere between 20 and 200 hours of gameplay for Inquisition. The design team were split into various specialist groups, each handling an aspect of game design, which was a departure from BioWare's previous approach to development when team members used to function as generalist designers. Instead of having one gigantic world, Inquisition features multiple hub worlds instead. Laidlaw added that by having multiple locations, the team can increase the game's visual variety and "give the player a break from the visual fatigue of seeing the same thing over and over again". The hub worlds had a more linear design than Skyrim's open world in that their content would eventually be fully exhausted. This was done to ensure players would return to their home base and either re-engage with the story or unlock new area. While the game features open spaces, the objectives within the world were often of little significance. This was largely because the team could not playtest the game because of troubles with the engine; it was too late for the team to change when they realized the problem. In hindsight, Laidlaw recognized the quest design was "a little hollow", and that Inquisition had a pacing problem for completionist players.

Following players' negative reactions to Dragon Age II and the ending controversy of Mass Effect 3, another tentpole title from BioWare, the Inquisition team looked at players' feedback and asked on the BioWare forum what players would like to see in the game. After two consecutive games with significant fan backlash, the team strove to create a game that would cater to the series' fans. Laidlaw added the team "wanted Inquisition to be the one which people would point to and say, 'they've found their feet. They've finally nailed down what this series is about'". According to BioWare founder Ray Muzyka, Inquisition was a "mixture of both Dragon Age: Origins and Dragon Age II" . Darrah said the return of the tactical view, the higher difficulty, and the more extensive customization system, were direct responses to criticisms of Dragon Age II and their attempt to bring Inquisition closer to that of Origins, which had a slower and more deliberate combat system. Players can also select the Inquisitor's race, an option re-introduced in Inquisition after players complained of being unable to choose a background for Hawke in II. Responding to criticisms that Dragon Age II was compromised to support console players, the user interface for the game's PC version was designed to be unique and different from that of the console versions.

=== Story ===
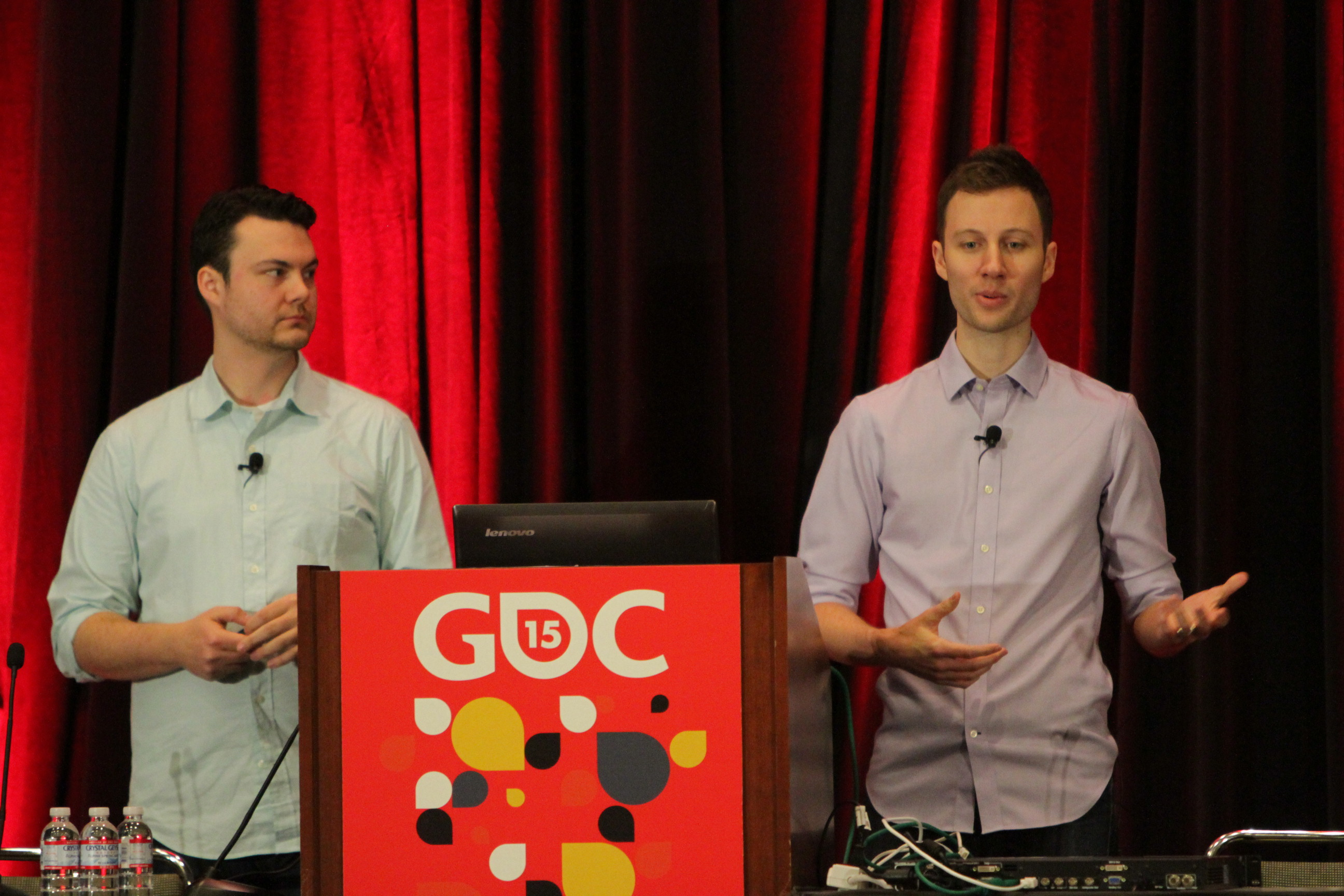
Technical designer Mark Wilson and narrative designer Kaelin Lavallee during their presentation about the game's story and systems at GDC 2015

BioWare faced the challenge of seeding story content in the largest single-player game world it had created at the time with relatively few design staff. The developmental team decided to split up and experimented with disparate techniques in order to achieve the desired content scope and density. The narrative design team's goal was to generate discrete narrative content, while the technical design team wanted to implement standalone, dynamic systems. The result was that the narrative designers discovered that the content they wrote had scaled poorly, whereas the technical team found that their work had a disconnected impact. During their presentation at the GDC in 2015, narrative designer Kaelin Lavallee and technical designer Mark Wilson explained that their respective teams decided to meet somewhere in the middle and work out a collaborative approach in order to build a large fantasy world that could properly scale in design. Examples of gameplay features given by Lavallee and Wilson which combine storytelling and level design include interactive objects that litter gameplay levels like the Astrarium puzzles and Ocularum artifacts which detect "shards", as well as a dynamic banter system which superseded banter system from previous games in the series which were triggered at specific locations in the game world. Lavallee and Wilson suggested that the teams were able to overcome some of the challenges of populating the large game world of Inquisition by combining story and systems, and concluded that the game's story content was a responsibility for everyone involved regardless of their defined role in the developmental cycle.

The development team recognised that Hawke's story lacked "clarity" and was "convoluted" and identified it as the main reason why Dragon Age II did not resonate with some players. This was because the story does not have an overarching villain and mainly explores how major events in the world influence Hawke's life. As a result, the storytelling for Inquisition aligned closer to that of Origins, and the Inquisitor was a more active hero than Hawke as they influence the world through their actions. While the critical path follows the Inquisition's attempts to foil Corypheus' plan to achieve apotheosis, the story also focuses on how players can actively turn the Inquisition into an important organization in Thedas through exploration and engaging in activities such as closing rifts and helping other non-playable characters. The writing team implemented changes to the conversation system. Additional dialogues are now hidden behind an option called "investigate"; the team wanted to allow players to pace the story on their own. The tone icons from Dragon Age II were pared back in Inquisition, as some players reported being confused by these icons in II causing them to make wrong choices. However, the team expanded the number of emotional response options available to choose from when these tone icons show up. The writing team felt it was essential to let players to react to the important events in the story and express themselves.

Inquisition saw the return of many characters from the previous two installments. Laidlaw said they only chose characters who would "add something, emotionally, to the texture of the game". The team worked to ensure that the game's cast had a balance in gender, race, and gameplay class. Characters who can be killed off in Origins and II would have a less significant role in Inquisition because not every player would have them in their world states. Gaider cited Varric as an easy inclusion because he was always going to survive Dragon Age II, and he had important roles to play in both II and Inquisition. Including characters from the previous games also allowed players to understand the significance of their choices in those games. While Hawke returns in Inquisition, the Warden from Origins does not make an appearance because they were not voiced in Origins and the team cannot create a character model that resembled their appearance in Origins. The Warden was set to appear in "Here Lies the Abyss" quest with Hawke, but this was cut late during the game's development. The team hired a former crime reporter whose role was to inspect every piece of Dragon Age media to ensure Inquisition had not deviated from the lore established. An internal wikia was created so that the team could keep track of the status of all the characters.

Unlike previous games in the series, Inquisition removed the gift system for party companions to make friendship and romance more organic. The companions would now react to game's events as they unfold and respond to the players differently. Gifts could no longer be exploited to gain or regain approval. The approval bar were removed, and players have to gauge how their companions perceive them based on subtle clues like how they greet the Inquisitor. Persona 4, The Darkness and The Last of Us inspired the new relationship system. Unlike Dragon Age II where nearly all romance options are bisexual by orientation, the romanceable characters in Inquisition have different sexual orientations. Dorian Pavus, for instance, is BioWare's first "fully gay" male companion.

=== Sound ===
Voillot was primarily responsible for technical matters, while Kent focused on the creative side. They delegated many distinct audio areas to individual employees who took ownership of the tasks they were assigned responsibility for. Voillot and Kent noted that the creative and technical vision for Inquisition, as well as relevant audio guidelines, were defined very early in pre-production. A large amount of content had been created at this stage, often with mere pictures as inspiration. Some of the important decisions they made include choosing the type of microphone that would achieve their desired dialogue direction, or locking down a composer. The decision to have Trevor Morris compose the game's original soundtracks was an intentional change, as Voillot and Kent wanted to introduce to the franchise a new emotional flavour.

For Kent and Voillot, the key challenges for Inquisition were centered on creating high quality audio across the enormous scale of content the player encounters, while at the same time creating a "dynamic, believable soundscape" to immerse them in the setting of Thedas. Voillot also liaised with audio programmers in harnessing the audio functionality of the Frostbite engine for a role-playing game, which he said differs greatly from first-person shooters in terms of technical requirements. Voillot pushed for the removal of key rote tasks including tagging animations or the placement of sound emitters so that the programmers can concentrate on producing high quality sounds. Semi-procedural systems were adopted, though audio programmers had to manually hand-script key story moments.

Raney Shockne composed a series of songs which are performed by a non-player character named Maryden Halewell, voiced by singer Elizaveta Khripounova, at a tavern in the player's base of operations. Elizaveta described the recording process for a video game as somewhat secretive, and controlled without any scope for collaboration or input from the performer as clients usually know exactly what they want and specifically request for it. Instructed to do a "folky ballad, Celtic troubadours-style", she received the instrumentals and lyrics from Shockne and recorded the songs in her bedroom with only a microphone to her laptop. Because the pronunciation for the tavern songs was meant to be very specific, she had to re-record on a number of occasions. The tavern songs and song sheets were collected into Dragon Age Inquisition: The Bard Songs, which are separate from the digital original soundtrack (OST) included with the game's Deluxe Edition. Due to popular demand, The Bard Songs were made free to download from January 26, 2015, to February 9, 2015, by BioWare, after which they were offered for sale on various digital platforms.

== Marketing and release ==
Publisher Electronic Arts first announced the game as Dragon Age III: Inquisition in September 2012. It was revealed that Inquisition was a collaboration between BioWare studios in Edmonton and Montreal. The game was initially targeting a late 2013 release date, until it was revealed at E3 2013 it was delayed to late 2014. EA dropped III from the game's title because it was an "all-new chapter inside of the Dragon Age universe", rather than a straightforward follow-up to Dragon Age II. Originally scheduled for release on October 7, 2014, the game was delayed for six weeks as the team needed additional time to polish the game.

BioWare confirmed on October 31, 2014, that Inquisition had declared gold, indicating it was being prepared for duplication and release. Electronic Arts released the game on November 18 in North America and November 21 in Europe. The game was not released in India to "avoid a breach of local content laws". EA released Dragon Age Keep, a "companion web experience", which allows players to customize the state of the world before beginning a playthrough of Inquisition. Within Dragon Age Keep, players can access Dragon Age: The Last Court, a companion game developed by Failbetter Games, although EA deactivated it in late 2020. BioWare offered a mini-game titled "Quest for the Red Lyrium Reapers" on the official Dragon Age: Inquisition website, which unlocked red lyrium-themed weapons as promotional rewards upon completion of the mini-game. This was later made available to all players in a "special delivery chest" as of Patch 11 released in October 2015. The Golden Nug statue was introduced in Patch 10 to allow players who already completed at least one playthrough to synchronize their previous collections of collectible items, recipes and schematics.

In addition to the standard version, other editions of Inquisition were made available for purchase. The Digital Deluxe Edition and Inquisitor's Editions come bundled with a digital copy of the game's OST as well as multiple in-game bonus items, such as a throne made out of a dragon's skull for Skyhold, mount skins, and the Flames of the Inquisition equipment series. The multiplayer DLC packs Destruction and Dragonslayer were released in December 2014 and May 2015 respectively, and both were available free of charge. New playable agents were also added in post-launch patches. The first single-player DLC Jaws of Hakkon was released on March 24, 2015, for PC and Xbox One and May 26, 2015, for PlayStation 3, PlayStation 4, and Xbox 360. It focuses on the previous Inquisition and the fate of the Inquisitor's predecessor, and introduces a new open area called the Frostback Basin. The Black Emporium, released on May 5, 2015, and available free of charge, adds a new vendor that sells exclusive items, and the "Mirror of Transformation", which allow players to change the appearance of their Inquisitor as many times as they want.

On July 6, 2015, BioWare announced that they intended to cease support for the remaining downloadable content of Inquisition for the seventh generation of video game consoles, though players can transfer their saved games to the newer hardwares. Spoils of the Avvar, which adds new in-game items, schematics, and customization options, was the last content pack released for the PlayStation 3 and Xbox 360 on June 9, 2015, while Spoils of the Qunari was the first content pack released exclusively for the eighth generation of video game consoles on July 22, 2015. The second single-player DLC, The Descent, developed by BioWare's Austin studio, was released on August 11, 2015. It brings the Inquisitor to the Deep Roads, where recurrent earthquakes threaten the worldwide lyrium trade, and potentially Thedas as a whole. The last single-player DLC, Trespasser, was released on September 8, 2015, set two years after the defeat of Corypheus. It expands upon the ending of Inquisition and concludes multiple story threads set up by the main game, while setting up new ones. EA released a Game of the Year edition of the game, which bundled the base game and all post-launch additional content, on October 6, 2015.

== Reception ==
Reception

Aggregate scores
Aggregator	Score
Metacritic	(PC) 85/100 (PS4) 89/100 (XONE) 85/100
OpenCritic	92% recommend

Review scores
Publication	Score
Destructoid	8.5/10
Eurogamer	8/10
Game Informer	9.5/10
GameSpot	9/10
GamesRadar+	4/5
IGN	8.8/10
Joystiq	5/5
PC Gamer (US)	87/100
Polygon	9.5/10

=== Critical reception ===
Dragon Age: Inquisition received "generally favorable" reviews, according to review aggregator platform Metacritic. OpenCritic determined that 92% of critics recommended the game. Many critics regarded it as a significant improvement over Dragon Age II, and helped revitalize the series.

Chris Carter of Destructoid liked the new combat system for its successful integration of the fast gameplay in Dragon Age II and the more tactical combat in Origins. In particular, he applauded the return of the tactical view. Polygon's Phillip Kollar agreed, saying that Inquisition "finds the best of both worlds with this system". Writing for Eurogamer, Richard Cobbett believed that the overhauled combat system was not entirely successful, and the repetitive battles disappointed him. He added none of the enemy encounters were tactically interesting. Joe Juba of Game Informer praised the combat as "satisfying" and felt it tasked players to "manage the flow of battle" during tense encounters. However, he criticized the tactical camera for being "unreliable". GameSpot's Kevin VanOrd described the combat system as "fun" and "colorful", though he too lamented the clumsiness of the tactical view, and believed that tactics and strategy were not required in most enemy encounters. GamesRadar's Maxwell McGee praised the expanded customization options and wrote that the combat system was further elevated by the game's vibrant and colorful visuals. Several critics noted the game's technical issues in their reviews.

Phil Savage of PC Gamer enjoyed the main campaign writing that "each mission is distinct, memorable, and significantly moves the story along". He enjoyed how the game showed the Inquisition's growth as an organisation. Carter appreciated the writing for the companions, singling out Varric and Dorian. However, he felt the script was weak in the early portion of the game, and that the story was "by-the-books fantasy" and "less nuanced than Origins". Cobbett felt the story was uninspiring, though he noted it eventually gained momentum. The portrayal of returning characters whose personalities were completely changed in Inquisition disappointed him. Juba lamented that many important story beats were poorly told, writing that "many of the would-be defining events feel abrupt or poorly explained", but he enjoyed interacting with the game's cast of characters and praised BioWare for reflecting player choices in Origins and II in Inquisition. Vince Ingenito, writing for IGN, also criticized the central plot, calling it "frustratingly vague", saying it "[lacked] the heart and pathos of BioWare's best games". While Cobbett was disappointed that the choices were not as impactful as he had hoped, Joystiq's Alexander Sliwinski wrote many choices were significant and that they brought both immediate and long-lasting impacts. Savage also wrote the main campaign is filled with "tough, world-shifting decisions". VanOrd liked the cast and enjoyed hearing the party banter, calling it "one of Inquisition's highlights". McGee described the characters as "eclectic" and "interesting", but wrote newcomers to the series may feel easily overwhelmed by the game's extensive lore, which was told mainly through codex entries scattered in the world. Robert Purchese of Eurogamer lauded the tarot cards used to depict the world and the characters in the game's menus, which changed based on how players interact with them.

Thedas, as presented in Inquisition, was often highlighted for being a realized world. Carter called the world "gigantic", and applauded Frostbite for its graphical prowess. He also appreciated the inclusion of optional dungeons and bosses in the game, which made exploring the hub world a rewarding experience. Juba liked the large open worlds, calling them and largest and best surprise for series fans. VanOrd added that travelling the world was "an absolute delight", though he felt that collecting crafting materials interrupted the game's pacing. While Savage enjoyed the large open worlds, the lack of a city hub like Kirkwall in II disappointed him, since the large open areas in Inquisition were set mainly in the wilderness and were not dense enough. Cobbett praised the inclusion of large open areas and believed it reflected BioWare's ambition and scale for the game, though he expressed disappointment with the mission design, compared to quests from MMOs. Many critics liked how the game's side activities are tied to Power as a gameplay mechanic. Critics considered the involvement of the Inquisitor in the politics of Thedas as one of the game's standout elements. The War Table missions were singled out by Kollar for further exploring the world and the various groups and factions inhabiting it. While the abundance of content was widely praised, Patricia Hernandez of Kotaku noted the game had a lot of filler content that was not meaningful or interesting, and it had an "overabundance of fluff". Hernandez urged players to leave the Hinterlands, one of the game's starting zones, as soon as possible.

Lisa Granshaw from Syfy praised a pivotal musical cutscene in the narrative of Inquisition, where the members of the Inquisition join and sing a song called “The Dawn Will Come”, as "one of the more unforgettable moments and pieces of music" in the series. Elijah Beahm from The Escapist noted that the game's tavern songs were made special by Elizaveta's "ethereal" voice and became unexpectedly popular.

=== Sales ===
Dragon Age: Inquisition debuted at No. 5 in UK in its first launch week. According to retail monitor Chart-Track, it had sold almost the exact amount of launch week copies as 2011's Dragon Age II. According to Electronic Arts' fiscal 2015 third quarter earnings report, Dragon Age: Inquisition is the most successful launch in BioWare history based on units sold. In September 2024, according to executive producer Mark Darrah, the game sold over 12 million units over its lifetime, surpassing EA's internal sale projections by a significant margin and becoming BioWare's best selling title.

=== Accolades ===
In addition to winning several awards at major events and ceremonies, it was selected by IGN, Ars Technica, Game Informer, Polygon, and Electronic Gaming Monthly as their Game of the Year in 2014.

Year	Award	Category	Result	Ref.
2014	Game Critics Awards Best of E3 2014	Best PC Game	Nominated	
2014	Game Critics Awards Best of E3 2014	Best RPG	Won	
2014	The Game Awards 2014	Game of the Year	Won	
2014	The Game Awards 2014	Best Role Playing Game	Won	
2015
2015	18th Annual D.I.C.E. Awards	Game of the Year	Won	
2015	18th Annual D.I.C.E. Awards	Role-Playing/Massively Multiplayer Game of the Year	Won	
2015	15th Game Developers Choice Awards	Best Design	Nominated	
2015	11th British Academy Games Awards	Best Game	Nominated	
2015	2015 SXSW Gaming Awards	Game of the Year	Won	
2015	2015 SXSW Gaming Awards	Excellence in Gameplay	Nominated	
2015	2015 SXSW Gaming Awards	Excellence in Technical Achievement	Nominated	
2015	2015 SXSW Gaming Awards	Excellence in Narrative	Nominated	
2015	2015 SXSW Gaming Awards	Excellence in Design and Direction	Nominated	
2015	2014 NAVGTR awards	Game of the Year	Won	
2015	2014 NAVGTR awards	Art Direction, Fantasy	Won	
2015	2014 NAVGTR awards	Costume Design	Won	
2015	2014 NAVGTR awards	Direction in a Game Camera	Nominated	
2015	2014 NAVGTR awards	Game Design, Franchise	Won	
2015	2014 NAVGTR awards	Performance in a Drama, Supporting (Corinne Kempa as Leliana)	Nominated	
2015	2014 NAVGTR awards	Song, Original or Adapted (The Dawn will Come)	Nominated	
2015	2014 NAVGTR awards	Sound Editing in Game Cinema	Won	
2015	2014 NAVGTR awards	Use of Sound, Franchise	Nominated	
2015	2014 NAVGTR awards	Writing in a Drama	Nominated	
2015	2014 NAVGTR awards	Game, Franchise Role-playing	Nominated	
2015	26th GLAAD Media Awards	Special Recognition Award	Won	

== Sequel ==
Dragon Age: The Veilguard, a direct sequel to Inquisition, was released on October 31, 2024. Solas featured prominently in the marketing and promotional material for the sequel; the original title of the game was Dragon Age: Dreadwolf, after his sobriquet. It was retitled Dragon Age: The Veilguard in June 2024 – BioWare explained that the titular Dread Wolf remains part of the game, however, the updated title is a stronger reflection of the game's focus.
