= Nicholas Boulton (actor) =

British actor (born 1968)

- Born: 22 November 1968 (age 57); Gibraltar
- Other name: Nick Boulton (Note: As credited in Hitman.)
- Occupation: Actor
- Years active: 1993–present
- Notable work: Game of Thrones; Dragon Age; Final Fantasy XIV
- Awards: BBC Carleton Hobbs Bursary
- Website: nicholasboulton.com

Nicholas Boulton (born 22 November 1968) is a British actor and narrator, known for his work in theatre, television, and video games.

As an actor, he has starred in Shakespeare in Love and Topsy-Turvy and has had minor roles in TV series like Game of Thrones and Doctor Who.

As a voice actor, he has provided voice work for BBC Radio 3 and BBC Radio 4. He is also known for his roles as the male version of the protagonist Hawke in Dragon Age II, Raubahn in Final Fantasy XIV, Reyes Vidal in Mass Effect: Andromeda, and Gadolt in Xenoblade Chronicles.

== Personal life ==
Boulton was born in Gibraltar to a Northern Irish family. He spent his childhood living in Ireland and England.

In his youth, Boulton attended Sherborne School in Dorset before enrolling at The Guildhall School of Music and Drama in London, where he studied from 1990 to 1993. In his final year, Boulton was awarded the BBC Carleton Hobbs Bursary, a BBC Radio Drama award aimed at supporting up-and-coming actors. Alongside the award, Boulton received a seven month contract with the Radio Drama Company.

In June 2023, AudioFile inducted Boulton as a Golden Voice for his work as an audiobook narrator. He has voiced more than 100 audiobooks.

== Career ==
Boulton is known for his voice role as Hawke, the protagonist of Dragon Age II. He shares this role with Jo Wyatt, who voices the female version of Hawke. Both actors reprise their roles in the video game series' sequel, Dragon Age: Inquisition. Boulton also stars in minor roles in several other BioWare titles such as Dragon Age: Origins, Mass Effect 3, and Mass Effect: Andromeda.

In Xenoblade Chronicles and Xenoblade Chronicles 3D, Boulton plays the role of Gadolt, a pivotal non-player character and fiancé to Sharla, one of the game's seven playable characters.

He is also known for playing Raubahn in the massively multiplayer online role-playing video game Final Fantasy XIV, a recurring character who serves as the leader of one of the game's main three city-states.

== Filmography ==
=== Film ===
Year	Title	Role	Notes
1994	Two Golden Balls	Randall Kyte	
1995	Under the Moon	Alex	TV movie
1998	Shakespeare in Love	Henry Condell	
1999	Topsy-Turvy	Hugh Conyngham	
2001	Sword of Honour	Bertie	TV movie
2006	The Kovak Box	US Consulate Official	
2007	Arn: The Knight Templar	Gerard de Ridefort	
2008	Arn – The Kingdom at Road's End	Gerard de Ridefort	
2008	Pernickety	Gordon Pernick	Short film
2011	Expectation Management	Elliot	Short film
2013	Deadly Descent: The Abominable Snowman	McCabe	
2013	Expectation Management 2	Elliot	Short film
2017	6 Days	Chris Cramer	
2018	Seven	Oil Worker	Short film
2019	Queen Marie of Romania	King George V	

=== Television ===
Year	Title	Role	Notes
1997	Kavanagh QC	David Cazalet	1 episode
1999	Wonderful You	Danny	2 episodes
2001	The Infinite World of H.G. Wells	Tom Keating	6 episodes
2004-2005	Life Begins	Keiron	6 episodes
2004	Heartbeat	Colin	1 episode
2005	Broken News	James Rampton	1 episode
2005	Firma	Simon Balls	4 episodes
2007	Doctor Who	Mr. Denning	Episode: "Gridlock"
2008	Heroes and Villains	Bleda	1 episode
2009	Jonathan Creek	Lance Gessler	1 episode
2009	Doc Martin	Mr Branning	1 episode
2009	Doctors	DS Sean Richmond	5 episodes
2012	Hustle	The Tall Man	1 episode
2012	Midsomer Murders	Dr. Markham	1 episode
2015	Game of Thrones	Pit Announcer	Episode: "The Dance of Dragons"
2016–2017	Level Up Norge	Kian Alvane, Edward Kelley	Voice, 2 episodes
2017	Benidorm	Beltoro Receptionist	1 episode
2017–2018	Casualty	Simon Feathering	3 episodes
2020	Cursed	Sir Bedivere	1 episode
2023	Doctor Who: Time War	Vice	Voice, 1 episode
2023	Endeavour	Jack Graham-Scott	1 episode
2023	Breeders	Henry	1 episode
2026	The Pendragon Cycle: Rise of the Merlin	Morcant	3 episodes

=== Video games ===
Year	Title	Role	Notes	Source
2007	Heavenly Sword	Additional voices		
2008	Viking: Battle for Asgard	-	Not specified	
2008	Conflict: Denied Ops	-	Not specified	
2009	Dragon Age: Origins	Vaughan, Ser Bryant, Arl Bryland		
2009	DiRT 2	Eastern European Male		
2010	James Bond 007: Blood Stone	Additional voices		
2010	GoldenEye 007	Additional voices		
2010	Fable III	Commander Milton		
2010	Lost Horizon	-	Not specified	
2010	Xenoblade Chronicles	Gadolt, Jade Face	Released in Europe and Oceania in 2011; voice lines are reused in the Xenoblade Chronicles: Definitive Edition remaster	
2011	Star Wars: The Old Republic	Watcher X, Lord Draahg, Stark		
2011	Dragon Age II: Mark of the Assassin	Hawke, Baron Arlange	Female Hawke is voiced by Jo Wyatt	
2011	Warhammer 40,000: Space Marine	Space Marine, Chaos Space Marine		
2011	Dragon Age II: Legacy	Hawke	Female Hawke is voiced by Jo Wyatt	
2011	Warhammer 40,000: Kill Team	-	Not specified	
2011	The Witcher 2: Assassins of Kings	Additional voices		
2011	Operation Flashpoint: Red River	Marines		
2011	Dragon Age II	Hawke, Xenon the Antiquarian, Malcolm Hawke	Female Hawke is voiced by Jo Wyatt	
2011	Killzone 3	Helghast Soldiers		
2011	The Last Story	Zangurak		
2012	ZombiU	King Boris		
2012	Assassin's Creed III	Additional voices		
2012	007 Legends	Aston Martin GPS		
2012	LittleBigPlanet PS Vita	Colonel Flounder		
2012	The Secret World	Mihas, Vlad Dracula, Eblis		
2012	Mass Effect 3	Major Coats, Dr. Baynar, Dr. Silon		
2013	Broken Sword 5: The Serpent's Curse	Richard Langham		
2013	Ryse: Son of Rome	Additional voices		
2013	Assassin's Creed IV: Black Flag	Additional voices		
2013	Killzone: Mercenary	Colonel Kratek		
2013	Company of Heroes 2	-	Not specified	
2013	Grid 2	-	Not specified	
2014	Dragon Age: Inquisition	Hawke, Xenon the Antiquarian, Master of the Hunt	Female Hawke is voiced by Jo Wyatt	
2014	Dreamfall Chapters	Kian Alvane		
2014	GRID Autosport	-	Not specified	
2015	Dragon Age: Inquisition - Trespasser	Master of the Hunt		
2015	Final Fantasy XIV: Heavensward	Raubahn Aldynn, Zephirin, Nyelbert		
2015	Xenoblade Chronicles 3D	Gadolt		
2016	Galaxy on Fire 3: Manticore	-		
2016	Star Ocean: Anamnesis	Additional voices		
2016	Steep	Ruben Bosman		
2016	Battlefield 1	-	Not specified	
2016	Battlefleet Gothic: Armada	Lord Admiral Ravensburg		
2016	Hitman	Brother Akram, Klaus Leibleid, Warlord Bodyguard	Credited as Nick Boulton	
2017	Star Wars: Battlefront II	-	Not specified	
2017	Total War: Warhammer II	Master Assassin		
2017	Echo	London		
2017	Hellblade: Senua's Sacrifice	Druth		
2017	Layton's Mystery Journey: Katrielle and the Millionaires' Conspiracy	Inspector Ercule Hastings		
2017	Final Fantasy XIV: Stormblood	Raubahn Aldynn		
2017	Warhammer 40,000: Dawn of War III	Space Marines, Eldar		
2017	Mass Effect: Andromeda	Reyes Vidal, Kadara Port Exile		
2017	Nioh	Edward Kelley		
2018	Forza Horizon 4	Mike Steel		
2018	Lego The Incredibles	Citizen		
2019	Monkey King: Hero Is Back	Hundun		
2019	Final Fantasy XIV: Shadowbringers	Raubahn Aldynn		
2019	Draugen	Edward		
2019	Another Eden: The Cat Beyond Time and Space	Lokido		
2020	Kosmokrats	Werner		
2020	Amnesia: Rebirth	Dr. Anton Metzier, Kharangi, Torture Victim		
2021	Chorus (video game)	Additional voices		
2021	Forza Horizon 5	Mike Steel, Horizon Announcer		
2021	Necromunda: Hired Gun	Rogue Doc, Lortharn, Orlock Boss		
2022	A Plague Tale: Requiem	Various soldiers		
2022	Steelrising	Eugène de Vaucanson, Nicolas Flamel, additional voices		
2022	Lego Star Wars: The Skywalker Saga	-	Not specified	
2024	Still Wakes the Deep	Trots, Banky, Dangleish		
2024	Senua's Saga: Hellblade II	Druth		
2024	Dragon Age: The Veilguard	First Warden		
2025	Final Fantasy Tactics	Ludovich Baert, Tavernmaster, Barbaneth Beoulve		
2026	Dragon Quest VII Reimagined	Sir Mervyn		
