= Hawke (Dragon Age) =

Player character in Dragon Age II

- Dragon Age character
- The default male (left) and female (right) Hawkes, as they appear in promotional material for Dragon Age II.
- First appearance: Dragon Age II (2011)
- Voiced by: Nicholas Boulton (male); Jo Wyatt (female)

Hawke is a character in BioWare's Dragon Age media franchise, first appearing as the player character of the 2011 role-playing video game Dragon Age II. Hawke is the eldest child of the human Hawke family, originally from the nation of Ferelden in the fictional world of Thedas. At the beginning of Dragon Age II, Hawke and their family flee the destruction caused by the Darkspawn during the Fifth Blight and settle as refugees in the city-state of Kirkwall. Over the following decade, Hawke rises from relative poverty to become a prominent figure in the city and receives the title "Champion of Kirkwall". Hawke later returns as a supporting character in 2014's Dragon Age: Inquisition.

The player's version of Hawke can be customized by gender, character class, first name and physical appearance. The player's cumulative choices also shape Hawke's personality, political allegiances and relationships with other characters. Unlike the protagonist of Dragon Age: Origins, however, Hawke has a predetermined family, nationality and broad personal history. The male and female versions of Hawke are voiced by Nicholas Boulton and Jo Wyatt, respectively. A male mage version of Hawke was used prominently in the marketing of Dragon Age II.

Reception towards Hawke was initially divided, particularly over BioWare's decision to replace the more freely customizable protagonist of Origins with a voiced character possessing an established background. Later criticism has frequently reassessed Hawke as an atypical role-playing game protagonist whose growing fame and power do not provide control over the events that shape their life. Critics have interpreted the character in terms of tragedy, refugee identity, limited player agency and the inability to prevent the loss of family and friends. Hawke has also been discussed in academic studies of morality, interpersonal relationships and sexuality in role-playing games.

== Character overview ==
Hawke is the eldest child of the renegade Ferelden mage Malcolm Hawke and Leandra Amell, a noblewoman originally from Kirkwall. During character creation in Dragon Age II, the player chooses Hawke's gender, first name and one of three character classes. A warrior or rogue Hawke served in the Ferelden army at the Battle of Ostagar alongside their younger brother Carver, while a mage Hawke is an apostate who, like their sister Bethany, has spent much of their life evading the Chantry and its Templars. Hawke's class determines which sibling survives the family's flight from Ferelden: Bethany survives alongside a warrior or rogue Hawke, while Carver survives alongside a mage.

Hawke's facial appearance can be customized by the player, and this customization also affects the facial structure, skin tone and hair of most members of the Hawke and Amell family. Charade Amell, the daughter of Hawke's uncle Gamlen, is an exception because she is established as resembling her mother. The player's decisions subsequently determine aspects of Hawke's combat specialization, relationships and political allegiances.

Dialogue is selected through a radial dialogue wheel which presents paraphrased responses. Repeated choices contribute to one of three broad personality types: diplomatic, humorous or aggressive. Each personality type influences Hawke's delivery when the character speaks without direct player input and can provide additional dialogue choices. Dragon Age: Inquisition allows the player to recreate their version of Hawke through its character creator and the world state imported through Dragon Age Keep.

== Concept and design ==
The 1998 role-playing game Planescape: Torment influenced lead writer David Gaider's approach to the story and characters of Dragon Age II. Gaider contrasted the largely malleable protagonist of Dragon Age: Origins with Hawke, who was designed with a pre-existing history and character arc while retaining player control over appearance, gender and major decisions. Gaider argued that introducing a voiced protagonist inevitably defined more of the character on the player's behalf, but cited the Nameless One from Planescape: Torment as an example of an established protagonist whose life could nevertheless be meaningfully shaped by the player.

An early visual concept for Hawke was a mage design referred to by the development team as the "Biker Mage". BioWare art director Matt Rhodes later recalled that exploratory visual-development work by the team provided a starting point for the eventual protagonist. The default male mage version of Hawke subsequently became the primary version used in the game's cover art, trailers and other marketing.

Where Origins was structured around an epic struggle against the Darkspawn, BioWare presented Dragon Age II as the story of a specific individual's life over approximately ten years. The player's actions determine Hawke's changing relationships, reputation and regrets during that period. The story is framed as an account given by Hawke's companion Varric Tethras, whose status as an unreliable narrator allows the game to selectively dramatize events in Hawke's biography. Gaider said the developers also wanted companion relationships to develop more organically and for Kirkwall to react to Hawke's increasing prominence over time.

BioWare did not intend Hawke to function as either a completely predefined character or a blank avatar. Jim Rossignol of Rock Paper Shotgun described the game's personality system before release as effectively allowing several substantially different versions of Hawke to emerge from the same established biography. The approach was compared with BioWare's Commander Shepard from the Mass Effect series, another voiced protagonist identified primarily by surname but whose appearance, gender and choices can be determined by the player.

=== Voice ===
Nicholas Boulton and Jo Wyatt provide the voices of male and female Hawke, respectively. Boulton said that he approached Hawke's three principal personality styles as different expressions of the same individual rather than three unrelated performances. He began from what he considered Hawke's natural emotional position and then varied the delivery according to the diplomatic, humorous or aggressive dialogue options.

Boulton reprised the role in Dragon Age: Inquisition. He said that returning to Hawke several years later required portraying someone older and changed by the events of Dragon Age II, describing the character as more experienced but also more damaged. He regarded the return as familiar despite the time between performances.

=== Cut content ===
A substantial amount of material involving Hawke was removed during Dragon Age II's compressed development. In 2021, Gaider discussed several ideas he would have restored in a hypothetical expanded version, including additional contextual dialogue from characters whose responses reflected prior encounters with Hawke. One proposed storyline concerned a mage Hawke confronting the possibility of demonic possession while trapped within their own mind. Gaider regretted its removal because mage characters elsewhere in the setting routinely face this danger while Hawke does not. He also would have restored an endgame option allowing Hawke to refuse to support either the mages or the Templars.

== Appearances ==
=== Dragon Age II ===
Dragon Age II presents Hawke's life through flashbacks narrated by Varric Tethras to Cassandra Pentaghast, who is attempting to determine Hawke's role in the conflict between the mages and Templars. Following the defeat of the Ferelden army at Ostagar, Hawke's family flees the Darkspawn destruction of Lothering. One of Hawke's siblings is killed during the journey before the survivors reach Kirkwall, the former home of their mother Leandra. The family discovers that Leandra's brother Gamlen has lost the Amell family fortune and estate, leaving them to begin their new lives among Kirkwall's poorer population.

A year later, Hawke joins Varric in a Deep Roads expedition and eventually acquires sufficient wealth to restore the family's position. Over the following years Hawke becomes increasingly involved in Kirkwall's affairs. Hawke fails to prevent the murder of Leandra by a blood mage, and later becomes central to a confrontation between Kirkwall and its resident Qunari. After defeating the Qunari leader, Hawke is celebrated as the "Champion of Kirkwall".

During the following years, relations between the city's mages and the Templar Order deteriorate despite Hawke's interventions. Hawke's companion Anders ultimately destroys Kirkwall's Chantry, precipitating open conflict and forcing Hawke to choose whether to support the mages or Templars. Regardless of that choice, the confrontation ends with the deaths of the factions' leaders and Hawke subsequently leaves Kirkwall.

=== Dragon Age: Inquisition ===
Hawke returns in Dragon Age: Inquisition after the outbreak of the Mage–Templar War and assists the Inquisition in investigating the Grey Wardens. Hawke discovers that members of the order are being manipulated by servants of Corypheus, an ancient adversary previously encountered by Hawke. During a confrontation, Hawke and the Inquisitor's party become trapped in the Fade. The player must choose between leaving Hawke or an allied Grey Warden behind while the others escape.

=== Other appearances ===
Hawke appears as a recruitable character in the Dragon Age II tie-in game Dragon Age Legends, with variants of the character later appearing in Heroes of Dragon Age. The default female Hawke is also depicted on the cover of the 2018 in-universe novella Dragon Age: Hard in Hightown, whose fictionalized story includes counterparts of several Dragon Age II characters.

== Reception ==
Hawke's conception as a more defined player character divided commentators before the release of Dragon Age II. Joe Juba of Game Informer welcomed the introduction of a fully voiced protagonist, believing that spoken responses made conversations more natural than scenes in which a silent customizable protagonist did not visibly react. Mike Fahey of Kotaku, by contrast, was concerned that Hawke's established identity would diminish the degree to which players could regard the protagonist as an extension of themselves. Although Fahey appreciated Commander Shepard as a character, he distinguished that experience from the greater identification he had felt with his character in Origins. In a separate article, however, he praised the design of the default female Hawke.

The friendship and rivalry system was likewise debated before release. Joseph Leray of Destructoid questioned whether rewarding both friendship and rivalry might lessen the consequences of Hawke repeatedly disagreeing with companions, because a sufficiently committed rivalry could preserve a relationship that might otherwise have collapsed.

Reception after release continued to reflect disagreement over Hawke and the game's narrower narrative scope. Kirk Hamilton of Kotaku defended the more personal story focused on Hawke's years in Kirkwall, while Electronic Arts later acknowledged that Dragon Age II had alienated some players. BioWare initially intended the protagonist of Inquisition to again be restricted to a human character, but restored multiple playable races after the reaction to Hawke. Fraser Brown of Destructoid nevertheless defended Hawke's fixed human origin as appropriate to the more specific story Dragon Age II attempted to tell.

Hawke's voice and personality system received more positive commentary. Lauren Morton of PC Gamer later identified Hawke as an example of a voiced role-playing protagonist that worked well despite offering fewer possible written responses than the Warden in Origins. She credited Boulton and Wyatt with providing a sufficiently strong personality to compensate for some of the lost freedom. In his contemporary review, Rich McCormick of PC Gamer found the male Hawke consistently charismatic and considered the absence of a conventional morality meter beneficial because he could select different tones according to the situation rather than maximizing one moral alignment. Becky Cunningham of RPGamer particularly praised a humorous female Hawke, crediting Wyatt's performance and the way Hawke's dialogue tone evolved according to the player's choices.

Rowan Kaiser of Unwinnable regarded the choice of potentially sacrificing Hawke, a protagonist whom returning players had previously controlled and shaped, to be particularly effective. He argued that the scene draws much of its force and gravitas from the accumulated history the player brings from the earlier games.

Hawke's temporary status as the series protagonist also attracted criticism after the character return in Inquisition. Kenneth Shepard of Fanbyte argued that repeatedly replacing the player character between Dragon Age installments weakened long-term emotional investment, because characters such as Hawke cease to be controlled by the player before their larger stories are necessarily complete.

== Analysis ==
=== Agency and tragedy ===
Later criticism has frequently treated the limitations imposed on Hawke as central to the character rather than simply a restriction on player choice. Katherine Cross of Game Developer interpreted Hawke as an unusually powerless role-playing protagonist despite the character's gradual acquisition of money, status and combat ability. She emphasized Hawke's beginning as a refugee and argued that the game's story repeatedly places the protagonist at the mercy of social and historical forces greater than any individual's power.

Cross related this structure to the concept of tyche in Greek tragedy, arguing that dramatic tension can result from what is taken away from a protagonist as much as from increasing their power. Hawke can succeed in individual confrontations but cannot necessarily save family members, prevent political radicalization or determine Kirkwall's eventual fate. Fraser Brown of PC Gamer similarly characterized Dragon Age II as effectively a biography of Hawke and considered them BioWare's most strongly defined player character. For Brown, Hawke's combination of importance and recurring powerlessness gives other people and institutions in Thedas greater apparent agency, because they continue to pursue their own agendas regardless of what the protagonist wants.

Liana Ruppert of Game Informer focused an extended retrospective on the cumulative tragedy of Hawke's story, describing the protagonist as a flawed "Schrodinger's Hero". She argued that Hawke's repeated inability to protect the people around them contributes to a form of realism unusual for a heroic player character: acquiring greater resources and prestige never guarantees that Hawke can avert personal loss. Cora Walker of Remeshed similarly interpreted Hawke as a person simultaneously burdened by power and loss. Writing specifically about the female version, Walker considered the character valuable from a feminist perspective because Hawke is allowed to make irreversible mistakes, suffer damage and continue living with the consequences rather than being required to embody an idealized form of female competence.

Susana Polo of Mothership returned to the same theme in a 2026 essay about agency throughout the Dragon Age series. She regarded Hawke as the franchise protagonist with the least control over major events and used Leandra's murder as a central example of Dragon Age II refusing the conventional fantasy that a capable hero will arrive in time to prevent disaster. Polo interpreted the contradiction between Hawke's title of Champion and their inability to save their family, control their companions or preserve Kirkwall as fundamental to the character's heroic arc: Hawke's significance lies in how they respond to events and whom they choose to care about rather than in their ability to determine history.

Not all critics regarded those restrictions as successful tragedy. Dennis C. Scimeca of The Escapist attempted to role-play Hawke as a political moderate and found that the game's final act forced the character into positions inconsistent with his earlier choices. He argued that the ending therefore failed to transform Hawke's lack of control into convincing tragedy and instead undermined the role he had attempted to construct.

=== Relationships, ethics and sexuality ===
Hawke's relationship mechanics have also attracted academic analysis. In the Heidelberg Journal of Religions on the Internet, leadership scholar Kristin M. S. Bezio examined the way each companion independently evaluates Hawke rather than the game measuring the protagonist against a universal morality scale. Bezio argued that the mechanic supports a humanist ethical framework in which interpersonal relationships provide a basis for judging Hawke's actions, contrasting this with the destructive religious absolutism depicted elsewhere in the game's mage, Templar and Qunari conflicts.

Peter Kelly examined Hawke's romances in the book Game Love: Essays on Play and Affection. Kelly treated Dragon Age II as an important development in digital romance systems, while arguing that the mechanics also demonstrate the difficulty of representing romantic attraction through predetermined ludic rules. Hawke's courtships are constructed from identifiable dialogue, approval, friendship or rivalry and progression states; Kelly argued that this makes romance mechanically legible to the player but can reduce the uncertainty and less predictable interpersonal dynamics associated with romantic relationships.

Stephen Greer analyzed Hawke's sexuality as part of a study of queer role-playing in Fable and Dragon Age. Unlike Origins, most of Dragon Age II's principal romance companions can enter relationships with Hawke regardless of whether the player has selected a male or female protagonist. Greer argued that Hawke's sexuality is therefore not defined as an attribute during character creation but emerges performatively from choices made during play. He described the companions as orienting themselves towards the player's performed desire, creating significant opportunities for gay, lesbian or bisexual role-playing while also questioning whether the system's comparative "blindness" to sexual difference can flatten distinctions between queer and heterosexual experience.

Ben Croshaw of The Escapist approached the same feature through personal role-playing experience. After playing a male Hawke who entered a relationship with Anders, Croshaw argued that the experience demonstrated the value of allowing a role-playing protagonist to possess a sexuality different from the player's own. He described becoming emotionally invested in the relationship precisely because he was role-playing Hawke as a character rather than attempting to reproduce himself in the game.

Jessica Hylton discussed a limitation of this approach in Women and Video Game Modding: Essays on Gender and the Digital Community. Hylton noted that information about Anders's previous relationship with the male mage Karl is presented differently depending on Hawke's selected gender: Anders identifies Karl as a former lover when speaking with a male Hawke, while the romantic history is omitted from the corresponding interaction with a female Hawke. Hylton treated this as an example of how player-dependent presentation can obscure queer characterization rather than merely broaden romantic choice.
