= Dragon Age: The Silent Grove =

Comics based on video games

- Cover art of the first issue by Anthony Palumbo

Publication information
- Publisher: Dark Horse Comics
- Format: Limited series
- Publication date: February – May 2012

Creative team
- Written by: David Gaider; Alexander Freed
- Artist(s): Chad Hardin; Anthony Palumbo (cover artist)
- Colorist: Michael Atiyeh

Dragon Age: The Silent Grove is a six-issue heroic fantasy comic book limited series set in the Dragon Age universe. The first in a series of Dragon Age visual media to be published by Dark Horse Comics, it was originally an exclusive digital release between February and May 2012. The series was primarily written by David Gaider, with Alexander Freed as scriptwriter and artwork by Chad Hardin.

The Silent Grove takes place following the events of the 2011 video game Dragon Age II and features appearances from major series characters Alistair, Varric Tethras, and Isabela. The story follows their exploits in the land of Antiva in search of answers to the truth behind the disappearance of Alistair's father and predecessor as King of Ferelden, Maric Theirin.

The Silent Grove has received some praise for its story, artwork and pacing, though other reviewers are less enthusiastic about the characterization of its protagonists. There is consensus among reviewers that readers who are already fans of the Dragon Age video game series would get the most enjoyment out of The Silent Grove.

== Plot ==
The events of the comic take place after the destruction of the Kirkwall Chantry at the end of Dragon Age II, but before the ending of Dragon Age: Asunder where a mage rebellion has erupted across Thedas.

Alistair Theirin, the ruling King of Ferelden, investigates the whereabouts of his father, Maric Theirin, who is presumed dead after he was said to be lost at sea years ago. Enlisting the aid of the dwarven merchant prince Varric Tethras and his associate, a pirate known as Isabela, his search for evidence leads him to Antiva, a land where merchant guilds and deadly assassins hold sway. After meeting an Antivan prince named Claudio Valisti, one of the leaders of the infamous guild of assassins known as the Antivan Crows, The trio break into a prison controlled by the Crows to investigate rumors that Maric is supposedly held as a prisoner there, where they learn from an adjacent prisoner that Maric was broken out long ago by a witch known as "The Beast of the Tellari swamps". Escaping the prison, Alistair reveals to his companions that it was Claudio who sent Alistair evidence the Crows had held Maric, spurring him into action.

The trio travel to the Teleri swamp region, where they encounter a large high dragon and the witch Yavana. Revealing herself to be a daughter of Flemeth, the Fereldan Witch of the Wilds, Yavana's claims that her mother saved Maric life long ago on the condition that he submits himself to her after he has restored his kingdom and his children had come of age. She hints that Maric's bloodline is special and is somehow connected to the fate of the world's dragons. The group is attacked by Antivan forces as soon as they depart Yavana's domain; Alistair is taken captive by Claudio, who reveals that he had manipulate the group as bait to find Yavana's sanctum, the "Silent Grove". Isabela and Varric retreat to confer with Yavana, then attacks the Antivan camp to mount a rescue. Isabela personally kills Claudio before Alistair can get an answer out of him about Maric's fate, though Yavana uses her magic to conjure Claudio's spirit and forces him to divulge the identity of his patron, a Tevinter magister named Aurelius Titus.

Yavana leads the group back to her sanctum, and bids Alistair to follow her down into a large cavern full of crystalline eggs. She explains to Alistair that this is a place where many dragons gather to hibernate and her purpose is to preserve dragonkind. As a result of her efforts in reawakening the dragons that did not sleep in their sleep, dragons have reemerged from near extinction to a sustainable population during the current century or "age". Yavana persuades Alistair to acquiesce to her request and awaken the last of the Great dragons, but Alistair responds by running her through with his sword and blames her and her kind for the recent tragedies that plague Ferelden. Unharmed by Yavana's dragons due to the nature of his bloodline, Alistair departs the sanctum with his companions and travels to the Tevinter Imperium to continue his quest.

== Publication ==
Dragon Age: The Silent Grove is the first Dragon Age comic book series to be published by Dark Horse Comics. It was first announced on November 2, 2011. Dragon Age lead writer David Gaider said Dark Horse had expressed an interest in working with BioWare on tie-in media for their video game series, such as Dragon Age, and noted their experience with making successful tie-in comic series for other intellectual properties. Dark Horse proposed centering the series around characters who are familiar to their readership, as well as the exploration lore which would give the comics some relevance to said audience. Gaider saw the comic series as an opportunity to present stories that he always wanted to do, but would not be able to fit into any of their video game projects.

The Silent Grove is Gaider's debut comic series. Gaider noted that he was personally invested in exploring storytelling opportunities for the franchise from a medium which he adored growing up. He described comic book writing to be different from his prior work in narrative design for video game as well as novel writing: a blend of cinematic and narrative elements complimented the visual composition, which lends itself to telling a story in a manner that is distinctly different from a novel, a movie, or a video game. From his perspective, comics offers similar benefits of collaboration in game design as he could see how other team members visualize the material he writes, although the collaboration process for comic books moves at a much faster pace due to the nature of the work. This is because any location within a video game requires hundreds of hours and a lot of human effort on the tileset and modeling, and due to that constraint video game developers could not afford to casually bring the player wherever they fancy unless the work could be justified as essential. With a comic book, the writer could have characters going to different geographical locations with ease, and the artist may draw any location desired by the writer.

For the comic book series, Gaider is attracted to the idea of setting the story within a locality in Thedas that is only mentioned within in-game lore and which the developers may never get to inside a video game, visualizing it for the benefit of fans of the series without any budget considerations to adhere to. Gaider decided on Antiva as the comic's initial setting, citing the cultural dynamics between the Italian city-states during the Middle Ages and its mixture of "cultured veneer and vicious in-fighting" as an inspiration. Gaider claimed in an interview that he decided to team Alistair, Varric and Isabela partly out of whim as he had enjoyed writing them in the past; a number of discussions with his colleagues also led Gaider to identify these characters and their backstories as an opportunities to explore series lore in a manner that would be impractical to do so in a video game. Although the three characters are primarily known as the companions of the player characters from the first two main series games, Gaider indicated that he would not go into too many specifics about their characteristics or what became of them. On the canon status of The Silent Grove, Gaider indicated that the series is "less canon" as it represents a divergent outcome from the open-ended nature of the video games' plots, and that story elements that are non-game are "canon if it can be". Using Alistair as an example as he is a major character in The Silent Grove, Gaider explained that his fate is linked to the player's choices in the video games, and in the same manner, the comic series may be considered simultaneously both canon and not canon to the player depending on whether Alistair is the King of Ferelden in their game.

=== Development ===
Gaider's colleague at BioWare Alexander Freed handled the task of transcribing his story outline into a script for the series. Freed described Gaider as the vision-holder for the comic, and the writing process for the series as a "David Gaider story filtered through an Alexander Freed lens". Gaider would first write a detailed outline of the key story points he wants to tell, which provides the action and a substantial amount of dialogue in narrative form, and sends it to Freed and their editor at Dark Horse. Freed would then scrutinize the outline by flagging any problematic prose, and occasionally providing feedback for minor items which could be included. Gaider would then write up a detailed plot synopsis, which breaks down all story elements, including portions of dialogue, issue-by-issue and scene-by-scene. Freed and their editor would respond by giving detailed feedback with an editorial mindset; as the series' scriptwriter, Freed focused on exploring the best approach on how to present Gaider's story synopsis in a comic. Issues which concerned Freed include how many pages a given scene may take, the pacing required by each scene and whether it is objectively interesting in a visual sense to the reader, and the optimal amount of "layering" of narrative captions, dialogue and art to convey the issue's tone.

Once Freed has finished compiling his notes and the final version of the synopsis is turned in by Gaider, he would script-break everything into a panel-by-panel script full of descriptions and lines of dialogue, and occasionally provided his own input if he felt that diverging from Gaider's synopsis would improve the story as a whole. His draft would then be revised by Gaider and their editor, with the former being primarily concerned with issues of consistency with Dragon Age lore and characterization of the characters through their dialogue. Once there is consensus on the finality of the revised draft, the panel-to-panel script is submitted to the series' artist Chad Hardin to be drawn, and afterwards it goes through coloring and lettering before it is prepared for publication. A major challenge for Gaider involved the estimation of how much story, which sometimes involve cinematic elements, is required for translation into a specific number of panels per page while leaving adequate creative freedom for the artist.

== Release ==
The Stolen Throne mini-series consist of six individual issues, all of which have been released digitally on Dark Horse's official website. On May 21, 2014, Dark Horse re-released the first two issues as part of its "#1 for $1" promotional initiative. The series was later collected in a hardcover print edition, which was published on July 25, 2012. It has been collected and re-released as Dragon Age Library Edition Volume 1 on June 4, 2014, and as part of the Dragon Age: The First Five Graphic Novels compilation released on October 27, 2020.

Dark Horse organized a live Twitter chat on February 28, 2012, to provide fans an opportunity to converse with David Gaider, with free digital copies of the first issue offered as an incentive for participation. To promote the release of the hardcover edition of The Stolen Throne, Dark Horse offered copies of Dragon Age: Dawn of the Seeker anime film, a signed Dragon Age Lithograph, a deck of themed playing cards, and Dragon Age Patches as prizes for participants in a competition held on Twitter.

Issue	Date	Pages	Creators
1	22 February 2012	14	Writers: David Gaider, Alexander Freed; Artist: Chad Hardin; Colorist: Michael Atiyeh; Cover Artist: Anthony Palumbo
2	7 March 2012	14	Writers: David Gaider, Alexander Freed; Artist: Chad Hardin; Colorist: Michael Atiyeh; Cover Artist: Anthony Palumbo
3	21 March 2012	14	Writers: David Gaider, Alexander Freed; Artist: Chad Hardin; Colorist: Michael Atiyeh; Cover Artist: Anthony Palumbo
4	4 April 2012	14	Writers: David Gaider, Alexander Freed; Artist: Chad Hardin; Colorist: Michael Atiyeh; Cover Artist: Anthony Palumbo
5	18 April 2012	14	Writers: David Gaider, Alexander Freed; Artist: Chad Hardin; Colorist: Michael Atiyeh; Cover Artist: Anthony Palumbo
6	2 May 2012	14	Writers: David Gaider, Alexander Freed; Artist: Chad Hardin; Colorist: Michael Atiyeh; Cover Artist: Anthony Palumbo

== Sequels ==
The narrative arc established by The Silent Grove is continued in its mini-series sequels, Dragon Age: Those Who Speak and Dragon Age: Until We Sleep. Those Who Speak follows the group as their investigation into Aurelius Titus leads them into the Tevinter Imperium, where they have to contend with a local cult as well as the Qunari. In Until We Sleep, the group allies with an old comrade of Alistair's from the Fifth Blight, now the supreme leader of the Qunari's military, as they attempt to stop Titus from gaining power. Along with The Silent Grove, Those Who Speak and Until We Sleep have been collected into Dragon Age Library Edition Volume 1 in 2014, and Dragon Age: The First Five Graphic Novels in 2020.

== Reception ==
The first issue of The Silent Grove was positively received, with praise for its lore, characterization, and value of money. Graphic Policy in particular suggested that this book is for readers who enjoyed the Dragon Age video games, as The Silent Grove is heavily dependent on their previous connections interacting with established characters and their knowledge of the setting. Sebastian "Severan" Kuryło from the Polish pop culture website Nerdheim scored The Silent Grove 8 out of 10. In her advance review of the first two issues, Karyn Pinter from Comics Bulletin was not particularly impressed with how the characters and action was translated from the highly regarded video games into the comic book medium, but remarked that the series may eventually become an exciting read provided improvements are made to its flaws.

In his review of Dragon Age - Library Edition, Volume 1, Mitch Dyer from IGN assessed the collection to be overall "rough around the edges", but praised The Silent Grove for its action sequences, and its exploration of its main characters to be on par with the best stories from the video games, in their physical and emotional struggles as well as their moral ambiguity. Dyer particularly liked Alistair's story, where he is depicted as struggling with his responsibilities as king and the morally questionable decisions he may be willing to make in order to accomplish his goals, and found his witticisms and levity refreshing within the context of the bleak world setting. In summary, Dyer found that "hardcore" Dragon Age fans will get the most out of the dive into the cultures, history and lore of Thedas, while newcomer readers may at least appreciate the "brutal battles, clever writing, gorgeous and detailed art, and lovable, thoughtful cast of characters".

In a retrospective review, Laura Merrill from Multiversity Comics found the plot of The Silent Grove to be overly familiar, with elements like Yavana's personality being barely distinguishable from her sister Morrigan, and that it fails to engage in the promise of its central dramatic question of whether "olde magicks" are too dangerous to be preserved. She criticized Alistair's characterization in the manner which he rushes to judgment and murders the only character with an "interesting perspective" on the dramatic question, which requires a nuanced answer in her view, and by doing so denying readers the opportunity to emotionally or intellectually invest in the story. In her summation of the various Dragon Age comic book mini series published by Dark Horse Comics up to the year 2020, Merrill considered The Silent Grove to be the worst, citing the lack of agency by its protagonists and the fact that they are written as passive characters who are being driven by the story.

Ashley Reed from Gameradar considered David Gaider's Dragon Age comic trilogy, which began with The Silent Grove, to be one of the best video game based comic books.
