= Broodmother =

The term Broodmother may refer to:

- a type of hero in Defense of the Ancients (DotA)
- a type of Darkspawn creature in the Dragon Age media franchise
- a Zerg unit in Starcraft 2
