= The Kovak Box =

- DVD cover
- Directed by: Daniel Monzón
- Written by: Daniel Monzón; Jorge Guerricaechevarría
- Produced by: Álvaro Augustín
- Starring: Timothy Hutton; Lucía Jiménez; Annette Badland; David Kelly
- Cinematography: Carles Gusi
- Edited by: Simon Cozens
- Music by: Roque Baños
- Distributed by: First Look Studios
- Release dates: 18 July 2006 (Montréal Fantasia Festival); 12 January 2007 (Spain)
- Running time: 102 minutes
- Countries: Spain; United Kingdom
- Language: English

The Kovak Box is a 2006 psychological thriller film directed by Daniel Monzón and starring Timothy Hutton, Lucía Jiménez, Annette Badland and David Kelly. The film concerns an American horror/science fiction novelist who finds the plot of one of his stories unfold around him after a conference in Spain.

== Plot ==
On the island city of Palma de Mallorca, David Norton promotes his latest book, The Kovak Box before a small private gathering of European fans. While nothing unusual happens, one of the audience members has a distinctive Russian Mafia arm tattoo, and the hotel concierges are subtly condescending towards Norton, despite the writer's mannered patronage and celebrity status.

Later in the evening, Norton's fiancée, Jane, receives an anonymous phone call and jumps off their hotel balcony. After Jane dies from her injuries in the hospital, Norton discovers a nearby patient, Silvia Méndez, did the same thing on the same night: While taking a shower, Silvia answered a call consisting only of the 1933 song Gloomy Sunday by composer Rezső Seress. After jumping from her window, she only remembers waking up nude under a crushed bar canopy. Silvia is a young nightclub debutante with no enemies or connections to the American couple. While Silvia recuperates in her apartment, a mysterious man attempts to stab her in the back of the neck but flees after their struggle. After the attack, Silvia reunites with Norton, who is also being pursued by unknown assailants.

Norton finds that the events coincide with the plot of his latest book, which is based on a real individual: Frank Kovak, a Hungarian doctor who was disgraced and driven to exile after his experiments were passed off as psychological warfare. Kovak used neural implants and paid a network of criminals to reproduce the experiment—in which everyone takes their life (or suffers a brutal death) while the Gloomy Sunday song plays—on Norton. Ailing from a terminal brain tumor, Kovak has nothing to lose except Norton winning his deadly game.

== Cast ==
- Timothy Hutton as David Norton
- Lucía Jiménez as Silvia Méndez
- David Kelly as Frank Kovak
- Georgia Mackenzie as Jane Graham (as Georgia MacKenzie)
- Gary Piquer as Jaume
- Annette Badland as Kathy
- Isabel Abarraga as Judy
- Jorge Aguado de Gabriel as Man with Umbilical Cord
- Ralph Angrick as Lift Passenger
- Ana Asensio as CNW Announcer
- Nina Bagusat as Hostess
- Keith Bartlett as Admirer
- Julio Bastida as Telecinco Announcer
- Jorge Bosch as Forensic
- Nicholas Boulton as Consulate Employee
