= Dragon Age: Redemption =

- Created by: Felicia Day
- Written by: Felicia Day
- Directed by: Peter Winther
- Starring: Felicia Day; Adam Rayner; Doug Jones; Marcia Battise; Masam Holden
- Country of origin: United States
- Original language: English
- No. of seasons: 1
- No. of episodes: 6

Production
- Cinematography: John Bartley

Original release
- Network: Machinima
- Release: October 10 – December 25, 2011

Dragon Age: Redemption is a 2011 American fantasy web series set in the fictional universe of BioWare's Dragon Age role-playing game franchise. Created and written by Felicia Day and directed by Peter Winther, the six-part series stars Day as Tallis, an elven assassin in the service of the Qunari who is sent to recapture a renegade mage. It was released through Machinima in October and November 2011.

The series was developed with BioWare as a cross-media companion to Dragon Age II and its downloadable expansion Mark Of The Assassin, in which Day also portrays Tallis. Contemporary reviewers praised the production design and its visual recreation of the games, although several found its reliance on established Dragon Age lore difficult for newcomers. The series has subsequently been discussed by scholars as an example of transmedia storytelling and for its treatment of religion and identity. It won three awards at the inaugural International Academy of Web Television Awards in 2012.

== Production ==
Electronic Arts and BioWare approached Day about creating a project based on one of the publisher's properties. Day, who had created and starred in the web series The Guild, chose Dragon Age. She later said that the opportunity allowed her to create a fantasy role for herself rather than wait to be cast in one. The production had already been filmed near Los Angeles in January 2011 when it was announced the following month.

Day worked with BioWare writers Mark Laidlaw and David Gaider on the script, with Day saying that maintaining the setting and tone of the games was an important concern. BioWare executive producer Mark Darrah described the series as canonical. Day structured the six installments after The Guild, giving each a self-contained beginning, middle and end while maintaining a continuing narrative across the series. She recruited Peter Winther to direct after he responded favorably to the script, while cinematographer John Bartley became involved through Winther. Day also approached Doug Jones to play Saarebas after meeting him at the previous year's San Diego Comic-Con.

The production sought to reproduce the visual design of the games despite the limitations of a web-series budget. Winther said that the already established visual identity of Dragon Age made the transition to live action comparatively straightforward. According to Day, the crew used artwork supplied from the games as the basis for physical costumes, props and sets. She described the project as substantially more ambitious than her previous web work, recalling that an early version of the script contained action sequences beyond what the production could realistically afford and that she relied on professional contacts to stretch its resources.

== Cast ==
- Felicia Day as Tallis, an elven assassin serving the Qunari
- Adam Rayner as Cairn, a Templar pursuing Saarebas
- Doug Jones as Saarebas, a renegade Qunari mage
- Marcia Battise as Nyree, a mercenary reaver
- Masam Holden as Josmael, a Dalish mage

== Episodes ==
No.	Title	Original release date
1	"Tallis"	October 10, 2011
Introduces the protagonist, initially referred to as "Athlok", who is tasked by the Qunari to recapture a rogue Qunari mage, who was originally captured and imprisoned in Kirkwall by the templars but managed to break out of captivity. She is promised to have her title - Tallis - returned, if she succeeds. In her search she crosses paths with a templar named Cairn, who is tracking the same mage.
2	"Cairn"	October 24, 2011
Tallis has a religious clash with Cairn, but saves him in the Dalish encampment. In the encampment they pick up another travelling companion - Josmael - a Dalish apostate. This episode gives a deeper insight into Thedas's lore.
3	"Josmael"	November 7, 2011
Tallis and her companions continue on tracking the Saarebas. Josmael reveals he is a talented healer, and Tallis puts his skills to a grim test.
4	"Nyree"	November 21, 2011
Tallis hires the mercenary reaver Nyree for her quest and fills in with her back-story and motivation for tracking the Saarebas. The episode reveals some more of Qunari lore.
5	"Mercenaries"	December 11, 2011
This episode delves into the back-story and motivations of Cairn, as the companions have an inside clash when he tries to kill Josmael and is in turn stopped by Nyree.
6	"Saarebas"	December 25, 2011
The heroes finally manage to track down the Saarebas, who is preparing a blood magic ritual to open a rift into the Fade. Josmael tries to rescue his bride-to-be only for her to reveal she's helping the Qunari willingly. In the resulting confusion, he fatally stabs her. Tallis, Cairn, and Nyree enter the fray. Tallis manages to stop the ritual, causing the angered Qunari mage to fire a lightning bolt at her. Cairn jumps in front of her and is killed. Tallis subdues the Saarebas and slits his throat against her orders. After burying the templar, Nyree leaves to escort Josmael home before heading back to Nevarra, while Tallis goes back to report to her superiors.

== Release ==
Dragon Age: Redemption premiered on October 11, 2011. It was released in six weekly installments, with the final episode appearing on November 15. The release was coordinated with Mark of the Assassin, a downloadable story expansion for Dragon Age II that also features Tallis. Media scholar Elizabeth Ellcessor described the two works as interconnected parts of a transmedia narrative, with the web series introducing Tallis outside the game and the downloadable content incorporating the character into Dragon Age II.

The series was released on DVD on February 14, 2012. The release included production featurettes, audio commentary and a blooper reel.

== Reception ==
=== Critical response ===
Critical response to Redemption was mixed. Ian MacIntyre of That Shelf regarded the series as unusually ambitious for web-based filmmaking and praised its use of costumes, sets, locations and limited visual effects. He also considered Day and Jones effective in their roles. MacIntyre's principal criticism was its method of introducing the setting: he found the explanatory title cards and dialogue dense with unfamiliar terminology and argued that the series too often relied on exposition rather than dramatizing its characters' histories.

Bobby Cooper of DVD Talk similarly thought that viewers already familiar with Dragon Age would have a considerable advantage, concluding that the series did not fully stand on its own for newcomers. He criticized what he regarded as inconsistencies in Tallis's characterization and an underdeveloped supporting cast, but praised the filmmakers' recreation of the game's appearance, describing the image quality, costumes and effects as impressive given the production's limitations.

John Stanley of the San Francisco Chronicle was substantially more negative, finding the story difficult to follow and criticizing the dialogue, action sequences and stunt work. Matt Blum, writing for Wired, responded more favorably to its presentation. He considered the limited special effects effective and singled out the fight choreography and its deliberate imitation of combat from the games, arguing that the visual approach helped make the series resemble a live-action version of a fantasy role-playing game.

=== Academic analysis ===
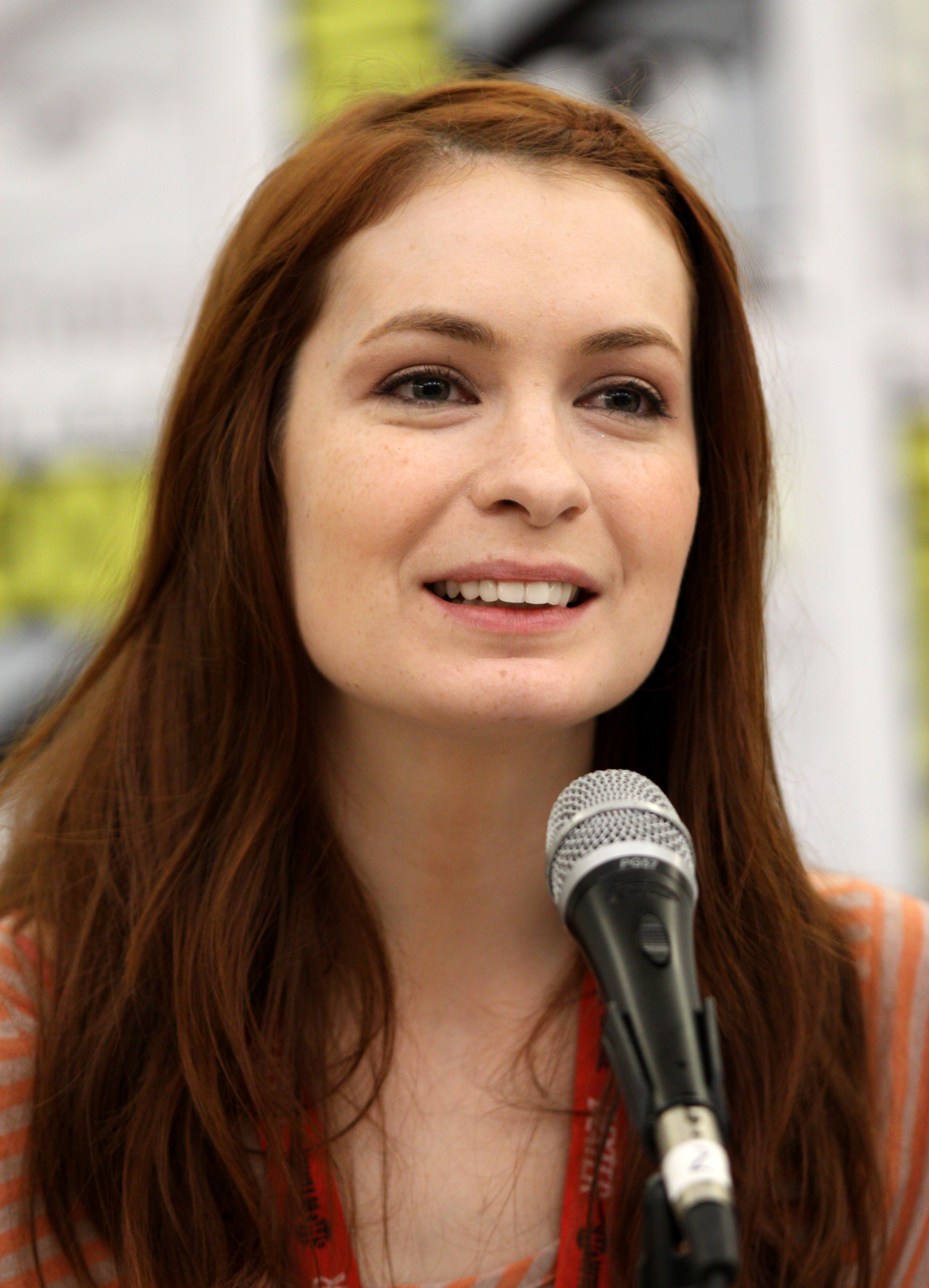
Felicia Day at the 2011 San Diego Comic-Con where she discussed her involvement in Dragon Age transmedia projects.

Ellcessor examined Redemption in a study of Day's position as an independent web producer and online celebrity. She distinguished the series from a conventional promotional paratext, describing it instead as one component of a wider transmedia narrative: the series expanded the world of Dragon Age, while Tallis and her storyline were carried back into Dragon Age II through Mark of the Assassin. Ellcessor also argued that the relatively modest production values and Day's established identity as a fan allowed Redemption to resemble a fan production despite being an officially licensed collaboration. In her analysis, this overlap between fan and producer was important to the way Day presented herself and her authority to work within an established franchise.

Media scholar Jana Radošinská identified Redemption and the earlier Warden's Fall as among the most significant transmedia extensions of the Dragon Age games. She characterized BioWare and Electronic Arts' association with Day and her existing online audience as an example of the franchise combining marketing with transmedia storytelling.

Religious-studies scholar Douglas E. Cowan later devoted part of his book Magic, Monsters, and Make-Believe Heroes to the series. He used Redemption as an example of economical fantasy storytelling, arguing that its short episodes rely on a combination of familiar fantasy conventions and the larger body of Dragon Age material to imply a more extensive world than could be shown on screen. Cowan's analysis focuses particularly on religion and identity. He interprets Tallis's obligations to the Qunari, Cairn's commitments as a Templar and Saarebas's rebellion against the role assigned to him as different expressions of characters struggling with identities defined by religious or social systems. He also contrasts the series with more conventional heroic fantasy, emphasizing its morally compromised characters and the absence of an uncomplicated victory at the conclusion..

=== Accolades ===
At the inaugural International Academy of Web Television Awards in 2012, Dragon Age: Redemption won for design, costume design, and makeup and special effects. Its composer, Peace Nistades, was also nominated for original music.

Awards and nominations for Dragon Age: Redemption
Year	Award	Category	Recipient	Result
2012	International Academy of Web Television Awards	Best Design	Greg Aronowitz	Won
2012	International Academy of Web Television Awards	Best Costume Design	Shawna Trpcic	Won
2012	International Academy of Web Television Awards	Best Makeup/Special Effects	Greg Aronowitz and Kimberly Graczyk	Won
2012	International Academy of Web Television Awards	Best Original Music	Peace Nistades	Nominated
