= Dragon Age: Inquisition – The Descent =

- Developer: BioWare
- Publisher: Electronic Arts
- Series: Dragon Age
- Engine: Frostbite 3
- Platforms: Microsoft Windows; PlayStation 4; Xbox One
- Release: August 11, 2015
- Genre: Action role-playing
- Mode: Single-player

Dragon Age: Inquisition – The Descent is a downloadable content (DLC) pack developed by BioWare and published by Electronic Arts for the 2014 action role-playing video game Dragon Age: Inquisition. It was initially released for Xbox One, PlayStation 4, and Microsoft Windows through Electronic Arts' digital distribution platform Origin on August 11, 2015. The pack follows the Inquisition's exploration of the Deep Roads, a subterranean network of underground pathways and tunnels built by dwarven civilizations of yore, to investigate the occurrence of strange earthquakes which is disrupting international trade of the precious material lyrium.

The Descent is the second major single-player narrative DLC pack released for Dragon Age: Inquisition. It received mixed reviews from video game publications, with critics praising the lore and history introduced by the pack's narrative, while criticizing its underdeveloped characters and storytelling, unbalanced combat difficulty, and short length when contrasted to its price point.

== Gameplay ==
A gameplay screenshot showing the Inquisitor being confronted by an ogre, a type of Darkspawn creature.

The Descent is a downloadable content (DLC) pack for the 2014 action role-playing video game Dragon Age: Inquisition. The player assumes the role of the Inquisitor, the leader of the organization known as the Inquisition. In The Descent, The Inquisitor receive reports about unnatural earthquakes of unknown origin rumbling through the Deep Roads, once a thriving a connection of trade, collapsing mine shafts and threatening the trade of lyrium, a mineral substance vital to the practice of magic as well as efforts to counteract it in the Dragon Age setting. Answering the call for aid from their dwarven allies, the Inquisition sets out on an expedition to investigate the source of the earthquakes. Much of the pack's dialogue consists of interactions between the Inquisitor and two dwarves, Shaper Valta and Lieutenant Renn, who accompany the Inquisitor's party and fight alongside them as allies. Valta in particular attributes the source of the earthquakes to the mythical beings known as Titans.

Through the War Table in Skyhold, the Inquisition's base of operations, players access the downloadable content pack by selecting a mission marker near the Storm Coast, which expends sixteen power points. The overall gameplay experience of The Descent is described as a linear "dungeon crawl", and a "massive dungeon" which spans many levels, and increases in difficulty as the player head steadily down into the layers of the mines. The Descent adds a selection of collectible items, equipment crafting schematics, puzzles and sidequests, spread through each layer. Players may collect dwarven cogs to open doors, or follow scrawled maps to find treasure. A smaller and area-specific version of the War Table allows the player to direct Inquisition forces on missions to repair disused passageways and open up new areas. The Darkspawn are a major enemy faction featured in the pack; players may experience difficulty spikes when fighting numerous waves of Darkspawn enemies.

== Development and release ==
BioWare's Austin studio (the developer of Star Wars: The Old Republic) developed The Descent; work began after their next project, Shadow Realms, was cancelled. BioWare staff described the pack's Deep Roads setting as dark and dangerous, and yet full of mysteries. Writer Courtney Woods noted that the further the player descends on their journey, the more secrets they will uncover and the more questions they will have about the lore of the Dragon Age universe. The Descent marks the first major appearance of the Darkspawn hordes in Inquisition. The palette for the Darkspawn is described as diverse: from an art direction standpoint, the Darkspawn are designed with a demonic-looking visage and their armor is pointy and aggressive in shape. The pack is intended to invoke a sense of exploration and the fantasy that the player is going somewhere no one else had been for a very long time, as the Darkspawn had destroyed dwarven society generations past and took over the ruins of their once thriving civilization.

On July 6, 2015, Electronic Arts announced that future DLCs will not be released for PlayStation 3 and Xbox 360, making The Descent the first narrative DLC pack for Inquisition not to be released for the seventh generation of video game consoles. The Descent was released on August 11, 2015, for Microsoft Windows, PlayStation 4, and Xbox One. It is made available for download via access codes bundled with physical copies of the Game of the Year edition of Inquisition for PC, PlayStation 4 and Xbox One, released on October 6, 2015.

== Reception ==
Reception

Aggregate score
Aggregator	Score
Metacritic	66/100 (PC); 63/100 (PS4)

Review scores
Publication	Score
GameRevolution	6/10
GameSpot	6/10
Hardcore Gamer	6/10
IGN	6.3/10
PC Gamer (US)	60/100

According to the review aggregator Metacritic, the Microsoft Windows and PlayStation 4 versions of The Descent received "mixed or average reviews" from video game publications.

Stephen Tan from Game Revolution was of the view that The Descent has the foundation of a strong side campaign and is adequately challenging with an interesting linear level design, which provides a contrast to the more freely open environments in Inquisition. On the other hand, Tan found that the characters are not memorable enough and the story does not leave a lasting impression as it finished too loosely. Tan suggested that a "fully reimagined Orzammar or characters who have some permanence" would have been a better alternative then what is presented in The Descent, noting especially that the Deep Roads is not the most fondly remembered setting in the series.

Chris Thursten from PC Gamer formed a view that while the pack is not terrible, it is "eminently missable". To Thursten, the Deep Roads' visuals seemed more dramatic and expansive due to the graphical capabilities of the game's Frostbite engine, and the revelations of certain esoteric mysteries at the conclusion of the pack would interest "hardcore Dragon Age lore fans". On the other hand, he found its overall quality to be "night-and-day in terms of scope, production values, character and lasting import" when contrasted with its immediate predecessor, Dragon Age: Inquisition – Jaws of Hakkon, and its characters likeable but whose journeys are overly familiar and brief.

Meghan Sullivan from IGN enjoyed the challenging gameplay in the pack, and that it gave her a "newfound appreciation for the pause-combat feature", which enables her to plan her moves and "find the right combination of spells and abilities" to deal with waves of enemy units instead of "mindlessly meleeing" her way.

Several reviewers expressed concerns about its length, particularly in relation its price point. Thursten finished the main story in three hours: he complained about its short length and compared the pack unfavorably to Jaws of Hakkon since both had the same price. Tan said he took more or less six-hours to complete the pack, noting that the pack's length would depend on how thorough players with acquiring collectible items. Sullivan said it took her less than ten hours to complete the pack in its entirety.
