= Dragon Age II downloadable content =

- Developer: BioWare
- Publisher: Electronic Arts
- Composer: Inon Zur
- Series: Dragon Age
- Engine: Lycium
- Platforms: Microsoft Windows, PlayStation 3, Xbox 360, OS X
- Release: The Exiled Prince; March 8, 2011; The Black Emporium; March 8, 2011; All-Class Item Pack; April 4, 2011; Legacy; July 26, 2011; All-Class Item Pack II; August 23, 2011; Mark of the Assassin; October 11, 2011

Dragon Age II is an action role-playing video game developed by BioWare and published by Electronic Arts (EA) for Microsoft Windows, PlayStation 3, Xbox 360 and OS X. It is the second major game in the Dragon Age series and was released worldwide in March 2011. The game features a total of six downloadable content packs that were released from November 2009 to September 2010 on Xbox Live, PlayStation Network, and BioWare's website. Most of these content packs feature new quests and new locations for players to access in the base game, as well as new items for the player to make use of. Two story-focused content packs serve as standalone side stories from the base game, both of which advance the narrative of the Dragon Age series as a whole: Legacy, and Mark of the Assassin.

In Legacy, released on July 26, 2011 to a mixed reception from reviewers, the game's protagonist Hawke investigates a prison constructed by the Grey Wardens with the assistance of their father Malcolm Hawke, which holds a powerful and ancient darkspawn. In Mark of the Assassin, released on October 11, 2011 which served as a tie-in with the webseries Dragon Age: Redemption, Hawke must help the elf spy Tallis infiltrate an Orlesian estate outside Kirkwall and steal a precious relic. Mark of the Assassin was warmly received by reviewers, who generally considered it to be the better of the two packs.

Many smaller content items in Dragon Age II were given away for promotional purposes as pre-order bonuses, platform exclusives and as rewards from participation in special events. Two of these items, Blood Dragon Armor and Ser Isaac's armor, were offered as part of crossover promotions.

== The Exiled Prince ==
The Exiled Prince, released on March 8, 2011, features a new companion: Sebastian Vael, a lay brother of the Chantry and master archer from a noble family who seeks vengeance after his family is murdered. It was available at the same time the game was launched, and available at no cost to players who pre-ordered a new copy of Dragon Age II. The Exiled Prince was also bundled with the "BioWare Signature Edition", which included new items and a digital version of the game's original soundtrack, as a free upgrade for players who pre-ordered a new copy of Dragon Age II.

== The Black Emporium ==
The Black Emporium, released on March 8, 2011, adds a vendor that sells exclusive items, a Mabari War Hound to fight at Hawke's side, and The Mirror of Transformation, which allows players to change Hawke's facial appearance as many times as they want. It was available at no cost to players who purchased a new copy of Dragon Age II.

== All-Class Item Packs ==
Two editions of All-Class Item Packs were released on April 4, 2011 and August 23, 2011 respectively. Each class item pack comes with around forty in-game items for the game's three character classes: the mage, the rogue, and the warrior. They include armor, weapons, boots, helmets, gloves, accessories, and shields. Each class item pack also features three companion-specific items.

== Legacy ==
Legacy, released on July 26, 2011, is the first story-driven DLC pack which is entirely played in an all-new location, a mysterious prison constructed by the Grey Wardens in a remote area. Legacy explores a story about Hawke's lineage, and the past dealings between Hawke's father and the Grey Wardens to hold an ancient evil at bay. To access the contents of the DLC pack, players must interact with a special statue in Hawke’s home.

BioWare used Legacy to address fan concerns, and rectify some of the common criticisms of the base game. These included excessive area reuse, wave-based enemy encounters, and the lack of companion customization and meaningful choices. Dragon Age producer Fernando Melo noted that players will face combat situations which will challenge them to approach gameplay in a more strategic and tactical manner compared to the main game, and that Hawke's followers and the environment play a more prominent role in combat. The DLC pack features non-linear bonus content outside of the main quest like puzzle areas and bonus rooms, as well as new enemy types like Brontos, a few varieties of Genlocks and Hurlocks, and various Deep Roads creatures. The DLC pack also unlocks "The Key", an upgradeable weapon which players can take it with them into the main campaign following the narrative's conclusion.

=== Plot ===
The narrative of Legacy is framed in the same way as the main game; Varric Tethras is still in the middle of an interrogation by Cassandra Pentaghast, where she tells him that he left out the details of one of Hawke's side adventures that she is aware of. Varric explained that Hawke's party, with Bethany or Carver as potential party members, traveled to a dark prison in the middle of the deserted Vimmark Mountains where they are trapped by magical barriers. Hawke’s investigation into why the Carta, a dwarven criminal syndicate, is targeting the Hawke family led the party there. They discover that the prison houses Corypheus, a powerful and ancient Darkspawn, and that thirty years before the events of Dragon Age II, the prison was magically resealed by Hawke's father on the direction of the Grey Wardens. This is because Corypheus is capable of influencing his Grey Warden jailors through the Taint in their blood, even while trapped in a dormant state. As a result, Corypheus managed to influence Carta members to pursue Malcolm Hawke's descendants to obtain their blood in order to release him. Corypheus is also able to influence both Grey Wardens who are entrusted with guarding his prison, Janeka and Larius, though unlike Janeka, Larius was able to retain his mental independence and kept Corypheus from controlling him completely. After meeting Janeka and Larius, Hawke is informed that the only way out is to slay Corypheus; Hawke may side with either Janeka or Larius, which results in the other being killed. Hawke releases Corypheus, and seemingly killed him. Unbeknownst to Hawke's party, Corypheus' soul transferred to the surviving Grey Warden, who then take their leave. Corypheus would later reappear in Dragon Age: Inquisition as its main antagonist.

=== Reception ===
Dragon Age II: Legacy

Aggregate score
Aggregator	Score
Metacritic	PC: 66/100; PS3: 65/100; X360: 64/100

Review scores
Publication	Score
Eurogamer	5/10
GameSpot	5.5/10
GameSpy	2.5/5
IGN	6.5/10
PC PowerPlay	9/10

Legacy received mixed to average reviews from critics. IGN's Arthur Gies noted that the DLC pack "see-saws between going-through-the-motions and meaningful character development". While Gies appreciated the character-centric exploration of the Hawke family's past, he questioned why the plotline of Legacy was not integrate into the main game in the first place. GameSpot editor Kevin VanOrd commented that Legacy expands upon the main game but makes no improvements, calling it "shrugworthy" as it had few standout moments and not worth the asking price. He noted that the DLC pack "makes a valiant attempt to strengthen your bond with Hawke, but ultimately it makes little impression", and he summed up the overall experience as "soulless".

Dan Whitehead of Eurogamer commented that Legacy "snuggles comfortably into a more traditional role-playing framework" and that little of the main game's narrative focus, which provided its greatest strengths, was evident throughout Legacy's narrative. He called Legacy a "template for not-bad-but-must-try-harder DLC" and a "passable addition to the game, but one that doesn't do anything to make itself essential". GameSpy's Mike Sharkey thought Legacy was too short and overpriced for amount and depth of content offered, and was to him a "$10 reminder of the full game's shortcomings". PC Powerplay's Meghann O'Neill gave the DLC pack a favorable review compared to other reviewers, noting that she enjoyed the character and appreciated how BioWare competently implemented genuinely useful feedback. Her verdict was that Legacy is a "surprisingly detailed add-in for this controversially received sequel. New approaches to encounter design and smarter enemies stand out, although story remains a strong feature".

== Mark of the Assassin ==
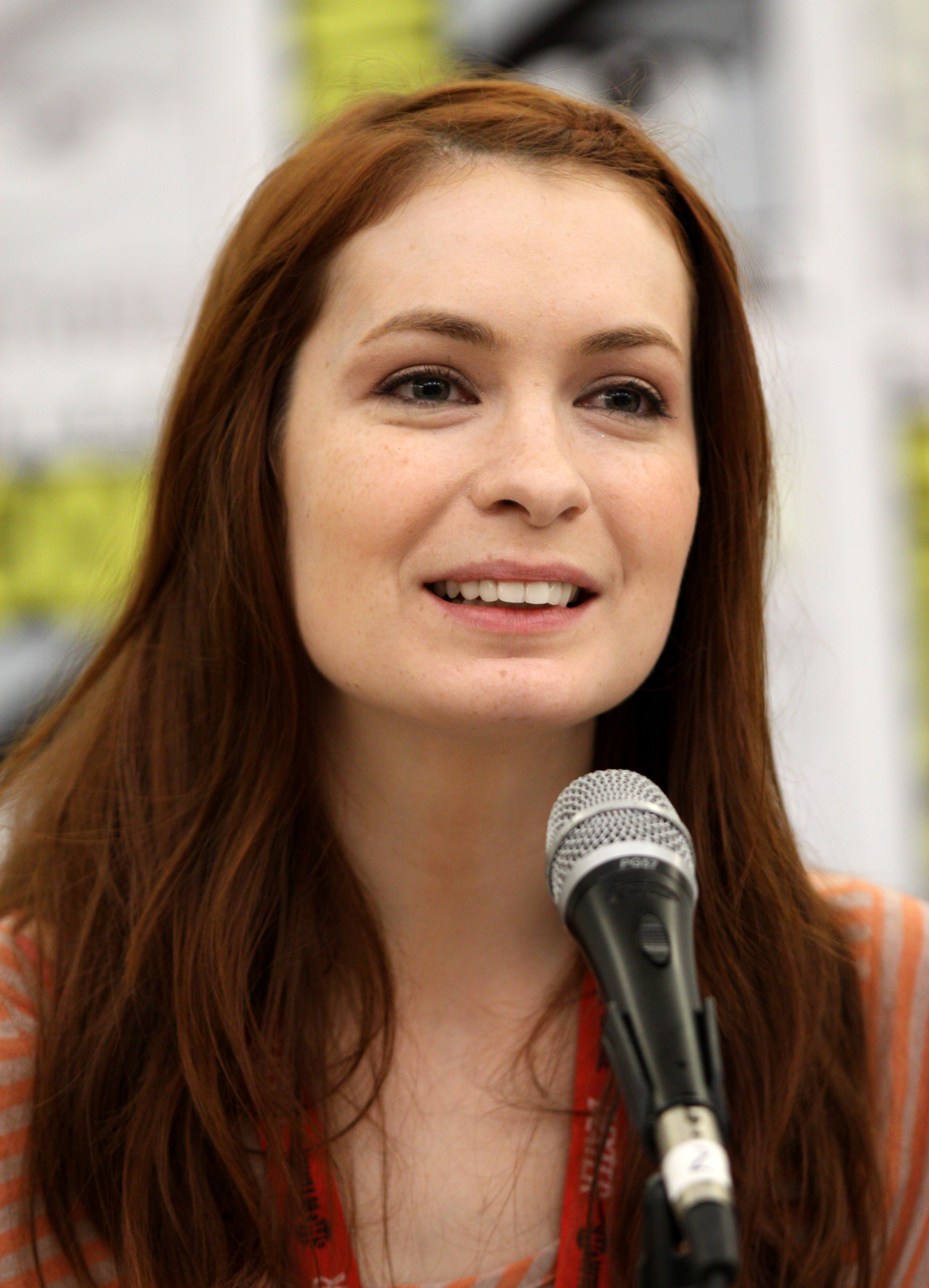
Felicia Day is the voice and likeness of Tallis.

Mark of the Assassin is the final DLC pack for Dragon Age II, released on October 11, 2011, one day after the premiere episode of the tie-in webseries Dragon Age: Redemption was released online. Like Legacy, Mark of the Assassin is a standalone story played in an entirely new location, namely Chateau Haine and its neighboring landscape. It added additional quests and Tallis from Redemption as a guest companion. The DLC pack introduces several Orlesian characters and provides further insight into their culture and society; some of the Orlesian noble characters serve as comic relief in a style of humor akin to the film Monty Python and the Holy Grail. Mark of the Assassin is slightly lengthier than Legacy, with over 12 hours of additional dialogue.

Felicia Day created the character Tallis, an elven convert to the Qunari system of thought and behavior, with BioWare's input. Day, a self-described fan of the Dragon Age franchise, said she is appreciative of the series' substantial amount of lore and that her involvement in the DLC pack was "a dream come true." As part of Day's research, she played through Dragon Age II multiple times in an attempt to discover as many of the different character reactions as possible. Day said that players do not have to watch the web series and play the DLC together, but doing so with leave them with a better insight into Tallis as a character. Day explained that the tone of the DLC pack is not overly serious, commenting that "It's very quippish," and that "There's a heavy moment, and then someone has a one-liner."

Like Legacy, some of the bigger battles in Mark of the Assassin are more challenging in difficulty and tactical in execution by design, compared to the main game. A notable enemy type introduced to the Dragon Age series in Mark of the Assassin is the wyvern, a smaller wingless cousin of dragons and is especially significant to Orlesian culture. Defeating a wyvern presents a substantial challenge for the player: proper class selection, strategy positioning, and appropriate ability usage such as magical spells or healing abilities are pivotal for success.

=== Plot ===
The narrative begins during Cassandra's ongoing interrogation of Varric, where she confronted him for not disclosing information about Hawke's involvement with Tallis and their activities at Château Haine, alleging that the Champion of Kirkwall's actions nearly started a war involving Orlais and the Free Marches. Varric reveals that Tallis interrupted an ambush meant for Hawke, and she persuaded the Champion of Kirkwall to accept an invitation from Duke Prosper de Monfort, a high-ranking Orlesian nobleman and a relative of the Orlesian Empress, to visit his estate outside Kirkwall as cover for her to steal the "Heart of the Many". Hawke and company arrive at the Château, having apparently accepted Prosper's previous invitation to the Champion of Kirkwall. After slaying a wyvern during a hunt, Prosper welcomes the Champion into his home. When Hawke and Tallis infiltrate his vault, it is then revealed that Prosper knew who the latter was all along and has the two imprisoned. Tallis reveals her allegiance to the Qunari and admits to Hawke that there never was a jewel called the "Heart of the Many"; she was in fact pursuing an individual named Salit, who defected from his people and was branded "Tal-Vashoth", as he intended to sell confidential information about the Qunari spy network in Thedas to Prosper.

After the two break out of their cell, and if Hawke and company attempt to escape right through the Château, Prosper will bar their escape as he summons a brigade of chevaliers and harlequins to fight them and seals the Château. He then leaves the Château, ordering his Chasind bodyguard, Cahir, to deal with the interlopers. Prosper then meets with Salit, expressing his regret for agreeing to spare Tallis and Hawke, and insists they conclude their exchange. Instead of the blackpowder formula, dreadnought plans, or a map of Qunanadar Prosper was expecting however, Salit gives Prosper a list of names detailing the various Qunari Ben-Hassrath agents in Thedas. Prosper fails to see the value of the information and is angered by Salit's seemingly useless offer. As he is confronted by Hawke, he unknowingly passes the list to a disguised Tallis. After all parties exchange words, Prosper fires a green substance at Salit that attracts the wyvern mount Leopold, who mauls and kills the Tal-Vashoth. In the ensuing battle, Hawke manages to trip Leopold while Prosper is riding him in mid-charge, ultimately resulting in him falling to his death. His threats of reprisal against Hawke are futile, as it would become scandalous if it became public knowledge that he was dealing with Tal-Vashoth, possibly on the Empress' orders. Tallis and Hawke part ways at the conclusion of Varric's narration.

=== Reception ===
Dragon Age II: Mark of the Assassin

Aggregate score
Aggregator	Score
Metacritic	PC: 83/100; PS3: 76/100; X360: 82/100

Review scores
Publication	Score
Destructoid	6.5/5
Eurogamer	8/10
GameSpot	7/10
IGN	8.5/10

Mark of the Assassin received generally favorable reviews. Felicia Day's involvement as Tallis in the DLC pack was considered a highlight by most reviewers. GameSpot editor Kevin VanOrd in particular commented that her "charming attitude gives the adventure a pleasant, buoyant vibe". He noted that the DLC pack's game environments were more spacious and inviting than before, and praised the humorous dialogue and story situations. IGN's Dan Griliopoulos assessed that Mark of the Assassin was overall "a neat little expansion, well formed and surprisingly well-paced", and recommended it as a worthy download.

Dan Whitehead of Eurogamer commented that BioWare's DLC output had been more variable than most in terms of quality, and noted that Mark of the Assassin was one of the better ones. Highlights for Whitehead included the narrative's superb plotting and pace, variety of quests, interesting enemy types, and the voice acting. He concluded that the pack was "an absorbing and varied side story" that subtly feeds back into the wider Dragon Age universe. Destructoid's Joseph Leray compared elements of gameplay in Mark of the Assassin more favorably to what he encountered in Legacy, rated the overall experience as slightly above average and summarized the pack as a "lighthearted and straightforward game that does most things right and nothing truly wrong."

== Other content ==
- The Blood Dragon Armor is available to players who possessed the Blood Dragon Armor in Dragon Age: Origins or Mass Effect 2.
- Players of Dead Space 2 received an exclusive armor in the game called Ser Isaac's armor, which is modeled after the costume of Dead Space's protagonist Isaac Clarke.
- Prior to December 7, 2012, certain in-game items were only available to the PC, PlayStation 3 and Xbox 360 versions of the game through limited promotional opportunities. From December 7, 2012, players may unlock all promotional and exclusive items, except for the Signature Edition bonus items, Blood Dragon Armor, and Ser Isaac Armor, for free. A total of 24 items were available for redemption by players.
