= Qunari =

Fictional people and culture in the Dragon Age franchise

- Dragon Age race
- Male and female Qunari concept art for Dragon Age II, which established the horned visual design used for the people in subsequent media.
- First appearance: Dragon Age: Origins (2009)
- Created by: BioWare

In-universe information
- Base of operations: Par Vollen and Seheron
- Leader: The Triumvirate
- Notable members: Sten; Tallis; Iron Bull

The Qunari are a fictional people and culture in BioWare's Dragon Age media franchise. Within the setting of Thedas, the term has two related meanings: it describes the large, usually horned humanoids associated with the northern territories of Par Vollen and Seheron, as well as a broader terminology for any adherent of the Qun, a religious, political and social philosophy closely associated with the aforementioned horned humanoids that assigns each individual in Qunari society a prescribed role. Those who abandon the Qun are called Tal-Vashoth, while people of Qunari ancestry born outside its society are known as Vashoth.

The Qunari were introduced through the companion Sten in the 2009 role-playing game Dragon Age: Origins. BioWare substantially redesigned the Qunari for the 2011 sequel Dragon Age II, making horns and a larger, more visually distinct physique characteristic of most Qunari. The Vashoth variant of the Qunari became a playable lineage available for player characters in 2014's Dragon Age: Inquisition, which also introduced the companion Iron Bull who provides a broader internal perspective on Qunari society.

Across the series, the Qunari are portrayed as technologically advanced and highly organized, but also politically expansionist and hostile to individual autonomy. Critical and scholarly discussion of the Qunari has focused on their changing visual design, the tension between collective order and individual autonomy in the Qun, and their use in the series to explore differences in culture, gender and sexuality. Commentators have examined them as a complication of fantasy's stereotypical "barbarous Other", while other scholarship has criticised their portrayal as an Orientalised collective against which the games privilege liberal individual agency.

== Concept and design ==
The Qunari were created as part of the development of the Dragon Age setting. Their first representative, Sten, appears in Origins as a comparatively human-looking, hornless warrior. Ahead of Dragon Age II, Game Informer's Jeff Cork contrasted Sten's appearance with the muscular, nearly demonic-looking and horned Qunari designed for the sequel.

Lead writer David Gaider later clarified that not every Qunari was intended to have horns and that hornlessness was not regarded within their society as a defect. He said that it could instead mark a person intended for a specialised role, while some people who abandoned the Qun removed their own horns. Senior artist Matt Goldman attributed the redesign to the art team's attempt to create greater visual separation between the peoples of Thedas. Because Sten had been the only Qunari shown in Origins, Goldman said that the Qunari's alteration appeared more dramatic than the contemporaneous redesigns of elves and dwarves.

For Inquisition, BioWare allowed players to create either a male or female Qunari player character. Their design was modified again to accommodate character creation and equipment. The more varied and humanised Qunari of Inquisition is a contrast to the physically imposing, comparatively uniform population as seen in Dragon Age II.

A design moodboard for Dragon Age: Inquisition, showing varied Qunari and Tal-Vashoth character designs alongside aspects of Qunari society in its architecture, weaponry and machinery. The figures include the Arishok, a restrained Saarebas mage, an early concept art of Tallis, and hornless Qunari individuals.

== Fictional attributes ==
=== Terminology and society ===
In the series, Qunari literally means "people of the Qun". It can refer to the horned humanoid people most closely associated with the Qun, but membership in Qunari society is ideological rather than exclusively biological: converts from the other peoples of Thedas are also Qunari. Conversely, a horned person who rejects the Qun is classified as Tal-Vashoth, while a Vashoth is born outside Qunari society and has never lived under it.

Within series lore, the term kossith refers to the ethnic people from whom the modern Qunari originated and is not presented as a straightforward racial synonym for Qunari. In Inquisition, Iron Bull states that the Qunari do not use the antiquated term as the name of their race and that surviving accounts do not establish whether the kossith resembled modern Qunari.

The Qun is presented as simultaneously a philosophy, religion, system of government and prescribed social order. Qunari society treats itself as a single organism in which people are educated, trained and assigned work according to assessed aptitude rather than personal preference. Most Qunari use occupational titles instead of personal names. Qunari government consists of a leadership triumvirate known as the Salasari. The Arigena heads the worker branch of society and is responsible for the welfare and health of the community; the Ariqun leads the priesthood, overseeing the teaching of the Qun and the advancement of scientific knowledge; and the Arishok commands the military, with responsibility for defence and territorial expansion. Because the military also conducts relations with outsiders, the Arishok functions as the Qunari's nominal head of state in foreign affairs and is sometimes mistaken by outsiders for a monarch. Beneath this leadership, Qunari institutions are organized according to prescribed social functions. The Ben-Hassrath operate within the priestly structure as investigators, intelligence agents and enforcers of ideological conformity, while Tamassrans exercise substantial social authority through the upbringing, education and assignment of children to roles suited to their assessed abilities.

The Dragon Age series depicts the Qunari as possessing technology unavailable elsewhere in Thedas, most notably gaatlok, an explosive powder whose production they keep as a trade secret. Their society does not use money internally and provides for its members collectively, but it also treats dissent and unassigned individual choice as threats to social order.

=== Gender and magic ===
Qunari social roles are strongly gendered, although the franchise distinguishes a person's assigned social gender from physical sex. In Inquisition, Iron Bull identifies the transgender mercenary Krem using the Qunari term aqun-athlok, describing a person who lives as a gender different from that assigned at birth.

The Qunari regard mages as especially dangerous. Qunari mages, called Saarebas, are assigned handlers and subjected to severe physical and social restrictions intended to prevent uncontrolled magic or demonic possession.

=== History ===
According to the franchise's fictional history, the Qunari established themselves on Par Vollen before launching a large-scale invasion of mainland Thedas during the Steel Age. Their forces conquered substantial territories before a series of religious wars known as the New Exalted Marches. Most combatants eventually signed the Llomerryn Accords, but the Tevinter Imperium rejected the settlement and remained at war with the Qunari. The continuing struggle over Seheron and northern Thedas forms part of the political background to the games.

== Appearances ==
=== Dragon Age: Origins ===
The Qunari are introduced in Dragon Age: Origins through Sten, a warrior sent to investigate the Darkspawn Blight in Ferelden. The player may free him from imprisonment and recruit him as a companion. Because Sten is the only Qunari encountered at length, Origins presents their society chiefly through his austere commitment to duty, his limited understanding of southern customs and his arguments with the player character about gender and social order.

=== Dragon Age II ===
The Qunari have a central role in the second act of Dragon Age II. A military delegation led by the Arishok becomes stranded in Kirkwall after the theft of a sacred text, the Tome of Koslun. As the Arishok's contempt for the city's corruption grows and frustrated residents seek conversion to the Qun, the dispute develops into an armed occupation. The storyline presents the Qunari both as an external military threat and as an ideological alternative attractive to people alienated from Kirkwall's institutions.

=== Dragon Age: Inquisition ===
Dragon Age: Inquisition allows the player to create a Vashoth protagonist with the surname Adaar, whose background is that of a mercenary raised outside the Qun. Unlike the earlier games, in which the player chiefly encounters Qunari society through non-player characters such as Sten and the Arishok, Inquisition therefore allows the player to embody a character of Qunari ancestry who has never lived under the Qun. The game also introduces Iron Bull, a Qunari Ben-Hassrath agent leading a mercenary company. His storyline contrasts loyalty to the Qun with the personal relationships he forms outside it and permits the player to influence whether he remains within Qunari society.

Inquisition presents a possible diplomatic alliance between the Inquisition and the Qunari, although its 2015 expansion Trespasser depicts Qunari agents using the eluvian network as part of an attempted military operation against the peoples of southern Thedas.

=== Dragon Age: The Veilguard ===
The player is also able to create a Qunari protagonist in Dragon Age: The Veilguard. Instead of having a predetermined Qunari backstory, the player is able to choose among five non-race-dependent backstories, which also determine the player's surname. Unlike the other races in the game, the player can only select thirty hair options for the Qunari, as opposed to the eighty-eight present for the other races.

== Reception and analysis ==
=== Visual design ===
Critics have discussed the Qunari's changing visual presentation across the series. Cork considered their transformation between Origins and Dragon Age II one of the most dramatic consequences of BioWare's revised art direction, emphasising the contrast between Sten's humanoid appearance and the horned, heavily built Qunari shown in the sequel. Brown characterised the Qunari as a society of deliberate contradictions: a technologically advanced militant theocracy that gestures toward equality and merit while maintaining rigid roles and treating people as resources. Brown similarly observed that the Qunari's physically intimidating design allows human societies within Thedas to portray them as barbaric, while their command of technology and rigorous social organization undermine that categorisation. He described their culture as combining collectivist provision and apparent meritocracy with inflexible gender roles, militarism and the subordination of individuals to assigned functions. Brown argued that the Qunari's visual design in Dragon Age II channels a reductive barbarian stereotype that humans within Thedas use to justify mistrust and poor treatment. He contrasted this image with their technologically advanced and highly ordered society, which rejects individualism and currency and suggests elements of equality and meritocracy while also enforcing strict gender roles and treating people as resources.

Matt Bertz of Game Informer considered the decision to make Qunari playable for Inquisition an appealing alternative to the human, elf and dwarf player character options traditionally offered by fantasy role-playing games. Mohamed S. Hassan, writing in the peer-reviewed journal gamevironments, situates race-defined avatar features within Inquisition's broader system of player identification and representation. He argues that the game's extensive choices of race, appearance and sexuality expand the identities available to players, while remaining constrained by a binary model of gender.

=== Culture and representation ===
Elizabeth Sampat, writing for Game Developer, analysed the Qunari as an evolution of the "barbarous Other" common to high fantasy. She argued that Sten's portrayal initially invited players to regard the Qunari as a backward warrior culture, whereas the Arishok and Iron Bull revealed a technologically sophisticated, educated and highly structured society capable of attracting willing converts. For Sampat, their distinctiveness came from ostensibly constructive principles taken to coercive extremes rather than from the innate savagery traditionally assigned to fantasy's enemy peoples. Francisco David García Martín and María Fernández Rodríguez similarly identify the Qunari as the paradigmatic "Other" of the Dragon Age setting. They argue that the series initially constructs them through the perspectives of other peoples who fear the Qunari while possessing little reliable knowledge of their society, allowing myth and misinformation to shape their apparently monstrous identity. The authors trace a gradual complication of this portrayal across the first three games, culminating in Inquisition, where greater access to Qunari perspectives and the ability to play a character of Qunari ancestry make their perceived monstrosity increasingly dependent upon perspective rather than an intrinsic characteristic.

Religious-studies scholar Douglas E. Cowan describes Tallis, an elven convert to the Qun who first appears in Dragon Age: Redemption, as acting as an enforcer of the Qunari's will. He observes that disobeying them places her at risk of becoming Tal-Vashoth, which would leave her without her name, calling or the only community she had known. Christine Marie Tomlinson likewise examines the Qunari's presentation through the series' treatment of religion. She argues that Dragon Age II gives the Qunari considerably greater narrative attention than Origins, while simultaneously flattening them into an essentialised group through their largely uniform horned character designs, their position as unwelcome outsiders in Kirkwall and the presentation of their beliefs as unfamiliar. Tomlinson interprets the resulting conflict, which centres on the theft of a Qunari sacred text, as part of the game's broader unease with religious pluralism. Kristin M. S. Bezio places the Qunari within Dragon Age II's wider depiction of religious conflict, treating the hierarchical Qun as one of the belief systems placed in opposition to the Chantry and arguing that the game's conflicts ultimately emphasise the dangers of extremist institutional devotion.

Scholar Takeo Rivera offered a more critical interpretation of their representation in Inquisition. In an article for Social Text, Rivera argued that the game validates liberal transgender inclusion through characters presented as bounded individuals capable of personal choice, while positioning the Qunari collective as a massified and Orientalised population defined by an absence of equivalent agency. Rivera termed this contrast "actional Orientalism", contending that the game's positive representation of individual queer identity depends partly on the abjection of racialised collective others.
