= Jo Wyatt =

British actress

- Born: United Kingdom
- Occupation: Actress
- Years active: 1981–present
- Website: jowyatt.com

Jo Wyatt is an English actress. She is known for her roles as Tweak in Octonauts and Little Miss Helpful, Little Miss Naughty, Little Miss Scary and Little Miss Sunshine in The Mr. Men Show, as well as Daisy Kribotnik in Love Soup, Natella in Bromwell High, and Mimi in Guess with Jess. She is also known for providing voices in many video games, such as Ciri in The Witcher 3: Wild Hunt, additional voices in Perfect Dark Zero and Dragon Quest VIII as well as narrating To Leo with Love.

== Early life ==
Wyatt was one of the original Minipops. Her father, Martin Wyatt, was the producer. She made a single, "Stupid Cupid", in 1982, and reached #1 in France. In 1984, she replaced Patsy Kensit as a new Luna in the second series of the UK science fiction show Luna.

At the age of 13, Wyatt helped to write the words to the theme song of the children's television series Wide Awake Club for the breakfast television network TV-am with a colleague of her father named Colin Frechter doing the music.

Whilst still a singer, Wyatt has also sung several songs on the vinyl record featuring the Care Bears The Care Bears to the Rescue in 1984 and the first nine songs of the long running children's television series Thomas the Tank Engine & Friends in the early 1990s with Tom and Laura Penta, Louise Roberts and Victoria Ferrer when the series was having sing along songs of its own for the very first time (only seven of them were turned into music videos whilst an early version of Gone Fishing was sung the series' former composer Junior Campbell which can be seen on the US VHS Rusty to the Rescue & Other Stories). Several years later, Wyatt went onto sing several more Thomas songs during the classic era however different children were used for each series.

In 1988, as a teenager, Wyatt wrote and provided the vocals to the theme song to the BBC children's animated series Barney with Frechter also writing the words and composing the music and some members of the Minipops doing additional vocals. In 1989, Wyatt sung a version of Downtown in the compilation Canzoni da Amare-International

== Voice acting ==
Wyatt is known for her voice role in Angelina Ballerina and as Lyra in all the His Dark Materials audio books. She has also read the role of Alice for the audio book of Alice in Wonderland.

She voiced Gracie, one of Angelina's friends, in Angelina Ballerina: The Next Steps. In Dragon Age II, she is the voice of the game's protagonist Hawke, if the player chooses to play as a female.

In The Octonauts, she voices the engineer, Tweak Bunny. She also voiced the character of Scratch in the US dub of Bob the Builder, during the final episodes of the show's classic era.

She also provided the voices of Jennifer in the video game Rule of Rose, the Female Imperial Agent in the video game Star Wars: The Old Republic, Alicia in Ni no Kuni, Meyneth in Xenoblade Chronicles, and Ciri in The Witcher 3: Wild Hunt.

== Filmography ==
=== Film ===
Year	Title	Role	Notes
1996	Vol-au-vent	Allison	
1999	Dream Street	The Wild Bunch	English version
2002	Angelina Ballerina: The Show Must Go On	Alice Nimbletoes, Priscilla Pinkpaws, Sammy Watts, Henry Mouseling	Voice, television film
2004	Captain Sabertooth	Veronica	Voice, English version
2005	Angelina Ballerina: Angelina's Princess Dance	Alice Nimbletoes, Priscilla Pinkpaws, Sammy Watts, Henry Mouseling	Voice, direct-to-video
2005	Whatever Happened to the Minipops?	Herself	Documentary, Interviewee
2006	A Christmas Carol	Mrs. Cratchit	Voice
2006	Robin Hood: Quest for the King	Maid Marian	Voice
2006	The Transporters	Sally	Voice
2007	Quest for a Heart	Princess, Frog	Voice, English version
2010	Spirit of the Forest	Pearl	Voice, English version
2010	Bob the Builder: The Legend of the Golden Hammer		Voice
2011	Foster	Jane	
2012	Tales of the Night	Girl	Voice, English version
2012	Not Born to be Gladiators	Lucilla	Voice, English version
2014	Postman Pat: The Movie	Meera Bains	Voice
2019	The Queen's Corgi	Wanda	Voice, American version

=== Television ===
Year	Title	Role	Notes
1983	Minipops	Lead Singer & Dancer	
1984	Luna	Luna	6 episodes
1992	The New Adventures of the Shoe People	All female characters	Voice
1994	The Bill	Nita James	Episode: "Fathers and Sons"
1998–2005	The Powerpuff Girls	Buttercup	Voice, UK promos
2001–03	Angelina Ballerina	Alice Nimbletoes, Priscilla Pinkpaws, Henry Mouseling, Sammy Watts, Polly Mouseling	Voice, 29 episodes
2001–03	Oswald	Gingerbread Woman, Laverne, Cactus Polly	Voice, English version
2005	Bromwell High	Natella, Various, Tasmin	Voice, 13 episodes
2005	Extras	Woman In Bar	Episode: "Ben Stiller"
2005	Love Soup	Daisy Kribotnik	Episode: "The Reflecting Pool"
2005–08	Planet Sketch	Starship Computer	Voice, season 2
2008	Chop Socky Chooks	Umé	Voice, episode: "Game Over Chooks!"
2008	Mama Mirabelle's Home Movies		Voice, episode: "Tales of the Galapagos/Happy Habitats"
2008	The Mr. Men Show	Little Miss Helpful, Little Miss Giggles, Little Miss Scary, Little Miss Naughty, Little Miss Sunshine	Voice, English version
2009	Dennis the Menace and Gnasher	Various	Voice, 2 episodes
2009	Guess with Jess	Mimi	Voice
2009–10	Angelina Ballerina: The Next Steps	Gracie	Voice, US dub
2009–13	Olivia	Olivia	Voice, UK dub
2010	Bob the Builder	Scratch	Voice, episode: "Scratch's Hidden Treasure", US dub
2010-23	Octonauts	Tweak	Voice
2012–16	Peter Rabbit	Cottontail, Mrs. Rabbit, Flopsy, Mopsy	Voice, season 1; UK dub
2014–present	Fireman Sam	Lizzie Sparkes, Hannah Sparkes	Voice, UK dub
2020–21	Mini Matinee	Croc	UK dub

=== Video games ===
Year	Title	Role	Notes	Source
1997	The Feeble Files			
2004	Fable			
2004	EyeToy: Play 2			
2005	Dragon Quest VIII: Journey of the Cursed King	Additional voices	English version	
2005	Perfect Dark Zero	Chandra		
2006	Rule of Rose	Jennifer		
2007	Hellgate: London			
2008	Dragon Quest Swords: The Masked Queen and the Tower of Mirrors	Fleurette	English version	
2008	Hot Shots Golf: Out of Bounds	Jasmine, Sophia, Rina	English version	
2008	Hot Shots Golf: Open Tee 2	Alice, Alizee, Ula	English version	
2008	Fable II			
2009	Dragon Age: Origins	Ostagar Nurse, Ostagar Priest, Elf Servant, Ostagar Soldier		
2010	Fable III			
2010	Xenoblade Chronicles	Meyneth, Face Nemesis	English version	
2011	Dragon Age II	Hawke (female)		
2011	Warhammer 40,000: Space Marine	Lilith		
2011	Star Wars: The Old Republic	Imperial Agent Female, Apprentice Malora, Phyne, Sentry Yashia, Additional Voices		
2012	The Last Story	Outsider, Meredith	English version	
2012	Mass Effect 3	Dr. Brynn Cole, Additional Voices		
2012	LittleBigPlanet PS Vita	Marianne Noisette		
2012	ZombiU	Sarah, Female Survivor #4		
2013	DmC: Devil May Cry	Additional voices	English version	
2013	Ni no Kuni: Wrath of the White Witch	Allie, Great Sage Alicia	English version	
2013	Soul Sacrifice			
2013	Professor Layton and the Azran Legacy	Aurora	English version	
2014	Professor Layton vs. Phoenix Wright: Ace Attorney	Darklaw	English version	
2014	Trials Fusion	SynDi		
2014	Dragon Age: Inquisition	Hawke (female)		
2014	Game of Thrones: A Telltale Games Series	Lady, Wildling		
2015–16	The Witcher 3: Wild Hunt	Ciri	English version	
2017	Xenoblade Chronicles 2	Galea	English version	
