= Nicholas Boulton =

Nicholas Boulton may refer to:

- Nicholas Boulton (actor) (born 1968), British voice actor
- Nicholas Boulton (cricketer) (born 1979), South African-born English cricketer

== See also ==
- Nick Bolton, American football player
