= Darkspawn =

Fictional species

- Dragon Age race
- From left to right: a hurlock, an emissary, and an ogre as they appear in Dragon Age II.
- Created by: David Gaider

In-universe information
- Base of operations: The Deep Roads
- Leader: Archdemons

The Darkspawn are a fictional collective of humanoid monsters who serve as recurring antagonists of the Dragon Age video game media franchise, developed by BioWare and owned by Electronic Arts. Within the series, they mostly dwell in the subterranean realms beneath the world of Thedas, the setting of the Dragon Age series. The Darkspawn are depicted as malevolent and ugly creatures who are capable of infecting other beings with a supernatural disease known as the "Taint", which twist its victims into monstrous creatures.

The supposed origins of the Darkspawn is presented in Dragon Age: Origins as a religious creation myth by the Chantry, the dominant religious organization of Thedas. The Darkspawn are portrayed as an overarching threat to the world of Thedas, as they periodically rise to the surface as a unified force led by an Archdemon, the corrupted form of ancient draconic beings once worshipped as deities by human civilizations in antiquity, killing indiscriminately and corrupting anything they encounter. The Darkspawn hordes are primarily opposed by the dwarven civilization of Thedas as well as the Grey Wardens, a sworn brotherhood of warriors formed to stop the rampaging hordes of monsters from overrunning the surface world by any necessary means.

The Darkspawn serve as the main antagonists of Origins, where they are initially presented as visually similar to orcs found in other fantasy fiction works such as the fantasy writings of J. R. R. Tolkien. They are redesigned from Dragon Age II onwards to match the developers' original vision of a race of diseased, twisted beings derived from the various sentient races of Thedas. The Darkspawn are generally considered to be the most notable monsters of the Dragon Age series, though some critics find them to be lacking in depth and nuance as antagonists. The Broodmother in particular, a type of Darkspawn unit that gives birth to other Darkspawn creatures, have been subject to critical commentary as a horror and gender trope.

== Development ==
The Darkspawn are created by David Gaider, the lead writer of the Dragon Age franchise from its inception until 2015. Neither the Darkspawn nor the Grey Wardens existed in his first draft of the world setting. Gaider elaborated in a 2017 post uploaded on Medium that James Ohlen, who led the design for Dragon Age: Origins, wanted Gaider to come up with an "evil horde" of sentient monsters, a ubiquitous enemy like orcs which does not confront the player with a moral dilemma about killing. Gaider initially disliked Ohlen's request, but eventually came up with an iteration he liked, where the "evil horde" is more of a reoccurring "living plague" which threaten the world on an irregular basis.

Gaider conceived of a backstory where in ancient times, mages used to rule the world of Thedas, and humanity used to worship a pantheon of draconic beings known as the Old Gods. The Maker, the deity worshipped by the Chantry which is positioned as the dominant human religion in modern times, is said to have trapped the Old Gods deep beneath the earth where they remain dormant. The rulers of a powerful nation called the Tevinter Imperium eventually decide to open a gateway into a heavenly realm out of hubris, and usurp the rule of the gods. The mages would then step out into the "Golden City", analogous to the real-world concept of Heaven, where it becomes tainted due to their imperfect nature as mortal humans and transforms into "The Black City"; the mages themselves are tainted in the process and turn into the first Darkspawn. Cast out by the Maker back into the mortal realm, the Darkspawn cannot stand the light of the day and burrow deep beneath the earth to get away from it. Gaider would then frame it as a story akin to the real world Christian original sin, told from the point of view of the priests of the Chantry instead of being an objective truth of the world's history. Codex entries and lore additions later in the series suggest multiple divergent in-universe perspectives of the Darkspawn's true origins.

Gaider decided that the Darkspawn would incessantly search for the Old Gods who are slumbering deep underground. The Darkspawn would invade the subterranean network of dwarven kingdoms known as the Deep Roads, and displace the dwarves from most of their cities. When an Old God is found the Darkspawn extend their Taint, which transforms the dragon into an Archdemon. When the Archdemon rises to the surface, the Darkspawn follow it as a "Blight", corrupting the surface as they go and spread across the land like swarms of locust. People who were wounded by a Darkspawn in battle or became infected by Darkspawn blood eventually succumb to the Taint and become Darkspawn themselves. In response, the various civilizations of the world realize they need to defend themselves against the Darkspawn. The Grey Warden Order arose as part of a trial and error response to permanently slay an Archdemon in order to stop a Blight and disperse the Darkspawn.

Screenshot of a Broodmother from Dragon Age: Origins.

Besides the origin story presented by Gaider, little was revealed about the Darkspawn, their biology or their society prior to the release of Origins. BioWare staff said in promotional material and interviews that the Darkspawn are essentially corrupted equivalents of the sentient races of Thedas; hurlocks, genlocks, shrieks and ogres are converted from human, dwarf, elf and Qunari stock respectively. Then-Creative Director of the series Mike Laidlaw described the Darkspawn as sadistic, marauding beings with no redeeming qualities. At a predetermined point in the narrative of Origins, the player encounters a boss fight with a Broodmother, a large, grotesque creature mutated from a female victim, who now function as part of the reproductive caste of Darkspawn society. Players also encounter various animals mutated by the Taint into monstrous versions of their original selves, such as blight wolves, bearskarns, corrupted spiders, and so on. Subsequent sequels in various media have further explored series lore about the Darkspawn and the Taint, including their connection to the Grey Wardens, the nature of the phenomenon known as "the Calling" which drives the Darkspawn to seek the Old Gods and the Wardens to end their lives in battle before their time, and so on.

Darkspawn characters are playable in the Darkspawn Chronicles, a downloadable content pack (DLC) for Origins which is presented as an alternate history retelling of the game's events and is non-canon. Rob Bartel, lead designer of the DLC, believed that putting the player into the role of a Darkspawn unit, and showing the capture of the human nation of Ferelden's capital city and fall from the Darkspawn's perspective is "an interesting thread that players would want to experience". Bartel said the Dragon Age franchise is "complex and multifaceted" with many different stories out there that could be told, and he positioned the Darkspawn Chronicles as a powerful visceral experience. He described the lives of the Darkspawn as "brutish, cruel, and short, but that's part of what makes them compelling.

=== Visual design ===
Side by side comparison of a hurlock character from Origins, and concept art of the redesigned hurlock. The latter's more humanlike appearance is intended to trigger strong empathetic responses from players.

"You only ever know how to design your game when it's done. That's just the reality. We're fortunate on Dragon Age to have the freedom to correct or finesse designs according to what we've learned in the past. At the end of the day, Concept Art is about telling the story of the game and we felt that the original design of the Darkspawn wasn't doing the story justice."

— Matt Rhodes, Associate Art Director at BioWare

The art style for the Darkspawn were among the major aspects of the series' setting which was overhauled during the transition between Origins and Dragon Age II. Early design work for Darkspawn in the Dragon Age universe was described in the Art of Dragon Age: Inquisition book as an "abominable" mash-up of twisted metal, chains and organic mass, literally signifying their corruption. According to Matt Goldman, who served as the art director for Dragon Age II, the adoption of a generic art style for Origins was an actual design principle for the art team that worked on the game. Goldman decided that the art style for the Dragon Age series had to change as other fantasy works like The Lord of the Rings and Conan the Barbarian have more or less defined the "generic" style in the fantasy genre. Goldman noted that he was not in a decision making role for the previous game's art department, and believed that being generic is not "the most inspirational direction" for a team to follow. Matt Rhodes, who worked on concept art for the Dragon Age series, explained in a blog post that the decision to redesign the Darkspawn was necessary for a number of reasons; besides their unsatisfactory art style in Origins, he cited the storytelling need to emphasize that the Taint is a severe sickness affecting people, and as a necessary retcon of the complex and intricate design of Darkspawn armor in Origins since the Taint is supposed to lead to brain decay, which results in a reduction of the victim's intelligence and sophistication. Rhodes acknowledged the divisive reception towards the redesign of the Darkspawn as a learning experience for the design team.

Lead Character Artist for Dragon Age II Shane Hawco explained in an interview with Pixologic that a decision was made to portray the Darkspawn "like a complete and cohesive group" with the new art direction, as opposed to their more "hodgepodge appearance" in Origins. The Darkspawn's overall visual design was simplified with a focus on angular elements, and their color palettes de-saturated "almost to the point of being black and white". Darkspawn armor is kept very primitive in aesthetic, almost to the point of not being well protected, since the Darkspawn's main concerns revolve around the Blight and the infection of the Taint as opposed to self-preservation. Hawco noted that this has the effect of reducing the perceived threat level for lower-ranked units like hurlocks, who are originally derived from humans; to balance this, the brutish ogre and the spellcasting emissary are depicted as large and intimidating, who tower over the player's party and are supported by a large army of hurlocks swarming in from all directions, the intention being to present them as a significant threat and a challenge for players.

The Darkspawn's role in combat was also considered, with the original design too easily blending into the background. As the Darkspawn are capable of appearing in almost any environment, the designers chose a high contrast color scheme to make sure individual units were readable; the skin is pale as an indicator of the Taint disease, and the armor is darkened. This assisted animators with telegraphing the attacks and movements of Darkspawn units, and players could spot them from the environment with little difficulty.

== Appearances ==
The Darkspawn are first mentioned in the 2009 novel Dragon Age: The Stolen Throne, where the Witch of the Wilds, Flemeth prophesied to King Maric Theirin of Ferelden that a Blight will come to Ferelden. An apparently sapient Darkspawn emissary, the Architect, makes his first appearance in Dragon Age: The Calling, where his plans to spread the Taint is thwarted by the Grey Wardens shortly after their return to Ferelden.

Origins opens with a cutscene reciting a parable about a group of powerful Tevinter magisters who attempted to invade the Golden City, only to be damned and cast down back into the mortal realm. Upon the mages' return to the world, they became the first Darkspawn, the source of evil that hangs over much of the series. The ending moments of the cutscene reveal that Origins is set on the eve of the fifth occurrence of the Blight, where a Darkspawn invasion led by an Archdemon on the Kingdom of Ferelden is imminent. The Grey Warden Duncan sets out to seek new recruits, where he will initiate them into the Order via a ritual called the Joining. The recruits would imbibe from a chalice a special preparation containing Darkspawn blood, which puts each initiate into a connection with the Darkspawn and the Archdemon. The Taint within the blood will kill some recruits, while survivors will become Grey Wardens. The survivor of the ritual, the player character, later became one of the few surviving members of the Order after a disastrous battle against the Darkspawn at the fortress of Ostagar wiped out most of the Grey Wardens in Ferelden.

The Blight would later spread throughout the land as civil war erupts between noble factions, while the surviving Grey Wardens work to gather allies to stand against the Darkspawn hordes and their leader. An incursion into the Deep Roads in search of the dwarven artifact the Anvil of The Void led the Grey Wardens into an encounter with a survivor of an ill-fated dwarven expedition named Hespith, who explains how the Darkspawn procreate and what the Darkpawn do to the victims they choose to take captive. Prior to the final battle against the Darkspawn in Ferelden's capital city of Denerim, Morrigan, the daughter of Flemeth and ally to Ferelden's last remaining Grey Wardens, reveals her true motivations for her companionship. Morrigan confirms that the Grey Warden who strikes the fatal blow against the Archdemon will die, but claims that if she undertakes a special ritual by copulating with a male Warden, the life of the Warden who slays the Archdemon will be preserved. The essence of the dying Archdemon will be transferred to Morrigan's unborn child who will, according to her, be reborn as an entity untouched by the corruption of the Darkspawn Taint. The Dragon Age: Origins – Awakening expansion pack reveal that following the demise of the Archdemon, the remaining Darkspawn hordes on the surface are depicted as devolving into opposing factions rallying around The Architect or a sapient Broodmother of human origin known simply as The Mother. Fully sentient and self aware versions of Darkspawn known as "Disciples", as well as the Mother's grub-like Children, are first introduced in Origins – Awakening.

Although the Blight plays a pivotal role in the beginning of Hawke's story in Dragon Age II, the Darkspawn are not the main focus of the game. The Darkspawn appear as enemies during the expedition to the Deep Roads in Act I, and in the DLC Dragon Age II: Legacy. Corypheus, another intelligent Darkspawn who is purportedly one of the original Magisters who entered the Maker's realm, is introduced in Legacy as its main antagonist. Unbeknownst to Hawke, Corypheus escaped his prison in the Vimmark Mountains by possessing one of his Grey Warden jailors, and later appears in Dragon Age: Inquisition as its central antagonist, though the Darkspawn hordes are never seen or counted among his forces. The Darkspawn appear as enemies in the DLC Dragon Age: Inquisition – The Descent, which takes place in the Deep Roads.

== Analysis ==
Tauriq Moosa from Polygon suggested that the idea of an all-consuming uncaring god stretches across BioWare's most popular franchises, including Dragon Age. Moosa said BioWare's "love of cosmic animosity toward creation found a new twist" in the Dragon Age series as reflected in the consistent victim-blaming narrative advocated by the Chantry, which blames mortal hubris for antagonizing the Maker and irresponsible use of magic for the creation of the Darkspawn. Moosa suggests that the Maker is a Victor Frankenstein figure who punishes all for the sins of the few, though he believes that the series lore secures apparent hope into mortal hands, as Chantry doctrine also encourages human action to win back the Maker's favor.

In her analysis of the cinematic intro for Origins, Cecilia Trenter formed the view that it is "designed to motivate the player" by creating a "dystopian historical consciousness" which combines and blurs the lines between a "dark past, a threatened present and an uncertain future" which is variously depicted throughout the intro; the historical consciousness works on different levels in order to create an identity. The virtual identity in this instance, the player character as the Grey Warden, is "dealing with a biographical forthcoming catastrophe" that forces them to join the Order to fight the Darkspawn.

== Reception ==
The Darkspawn are considered to be an important element of the Dragon Age series, though some sources feel they lack depth and nuance. Kirk Hamilton from Kotaku mocked the Darkspawn as "goofily-named", but acknowledged their importance as the most notable monsters of the series. PC Gamer described the Darkspawn as "the kind of world-consuming threat that demands attention, even if most of them are faceless hunks of evil" for players to kill. PC Gamer staff member Tom Senior acknowledged that the Darkspawn are good fantasy villains, but expressed a preference for "grey-area antagonists" who work against player characters for their own relatable reasons, such as Loghain Mac Tir and Flemeth. Carolyn Jong noted that other characters in the games frequently referred to the Darkspawn as "evil, soulless creatures", which in her view renders them as "voiceless objects", and are therefore subject to "finalizing secondhand definitions". Jong noted that in Origins, there are no opportunities for non-violent interactions with Darkspawn, except as "finalized, externalized objects that exist only to be killed", which in her view forces players to "operate within an overly simplistic, binary opposition". Conor Rennick from Headstuff compared the Darkspawn unfavorably to villains like Loghain due to their "comparative lack of personality".

"The argument underpinning this article is that the act of playing as a hero who slays pregnant and birthing monsters—referred to here as 'Broodmothers'— functions as a re-enactment of the violence directed at women's bodies within our heteropatriarchal societies. This virtual symbolic violence therefore reinforces misogynistic hegemonic ideologies."

— Sarah Stang, The Broodmother as Monstrous-Feminine

The Broodmother has received particular attention due to her reproductive role within Darkspawn society. Sarah Stang explored the concept of "monstrous-feminine" video game characters in a paper published by York University, where she discussed the Broodmothers in detail as "problematic examples of the abject monstrous-feminine" that follow "a long tradition in horror media of framing the female body and the birthing process as something horrific and repulsive". Aimee Hart from Bloody Disgusting agreed that Broodmothers are an example of female bodies being frequently intruded on as a horror trope and how "fertility, particularly through rape, is used to strike fear into the heart of the player through the threat of the gruesome and grotesque treatment of the body" by using "a personal threat of the obscene against female bodies to both cower and fascinate the player". Hart said Hespith's poem about the origins of the Broodmothers is one of the most disturbing moments in Dragon Age history. Conversely, Kirk McKeand from PCGamesN believe that the upcoming fourth title of the series needs to re-embrace the dark storytelling of Origins and look to its extensive collection of "sickening, self-contained stories" such as the Broodmother encounter for inspiration.

The Deep Roads setting, which is featured in all main series games and are mostly populated with Darkspawn enemies, has also been criticized. Heather Alexandra said while it is "thematically cogent in many ways" and "helps illustrate the size of the darkspawn horde", they considered the Deep Roads a long "slog" which is overly annoying and a feature they are more than happy to skip.
