= List of Satellaview broadcasts =

This list of Satellaview broadcasts is organized by genre (game, magazine, or data broadcast) and then alphabetically by broadcast title. Because the Satellaview was available only to the Japanese market, the official titles are Japanese and literal English translations are provided where possible.

This is intended as a complete list of all official St.GIGA broadcasts transmitted between April 23, 1995 and June 30, 2000 via the BS network to be received and unscrambled by subscribers to Nintendo's Satellaview service. The list encompasses data broadcast from the period of partnership between St.GIGA and Nintendo (April 1995 – April 1999) as well as the period of sole St.GIGA control (April 1999 – June 2000).

Because many Satellaview broadcasts were episodic in nature, individual broadcast titles often took a standard "Dai-Shuu" form which indicated to the player the episode number in terms of weeks (for example, "Game Title 第X週", where "X" represents the week number). Other Satellaview broadcasts bore titles that more directly reflected the exact date of the broadcast. This was common, for example, with the Nintendo Power magazine broadcasts. To reduce repetition, this list displays the name of the broadcast and the number of weeks during which unique episodes were broadcast (including the dates of first broadcast); however dates and "Dai-Shuu" constructions have been removed to allow a single listing for the item.

Numerous non-SoundLink Satellaview broadcasts were originally or simultaneously released for the Super Famicom.

== Broadcast game list ==
There are 118 of the 231 Satellaview games on this list.

Lit. English title	Japanese title	Unique broadcast weeks	Broadcast date(s)	SoundLink support	Original game for Satellaview
1st Satellaview Cup Ikuno Dictus Memorial Semi-Finals&Finals	Daiikkai Saterabyū-hai Ikunodikutasu Kinen Junkesshou.Kesshou (第1回サテラビュー杯 イクノディクタス記念 準決勝・決勝)	1	September 23, 1996	✗	✓
1st Satellaview Cup Satella Derby Semi-Finals&Finals	Daiikkai Saterabyū-hai Satera Dābī Junkesshou.Kesshou (第1回サテラビュー杯 サテラダービー 準決勝・決勝)	4	September 1, 1996; September 8, 1996; September 15, 1996; September 22, 1996	✓	✓
1st Satellaview Cup Satella Sprint Stakes Semi-Finals&Finals	Daiikkai Saterabyū-hai Satera Supurinto Sutēkusu Junkesshou.Kesshou (第1回サテラビュー杯 サテラスプリントステークス 準決勝・決勝)	1	September 2, 1996	✗	✓
1st Satellaview Cup Sharrood Memorial Semi-Finals&Finals	Daiikkai Saterabyū-hai Sharūdo Kinen Junkesshou.Kesshou (第1回サテラビュー杯 シャルード記念 準決勝・決勝)	1	September 15, 1996	✗	✓
Albert Odyssey	Arubāto Odessei (アルバートオデッセイ)	1	March 29, 1998	✗	✗
All Japan Super Bombliss Cup '95	All Japan Super Bombliss Cup'95 (All Japanスーパーボンブリスカップ'95)	4	October 4, 1995; October 11, 1995; October 18, 1995; October 25, 1995	✓	✓
Arkanoid: Doh It Again	アルカノイド Doh It Again	1	August 31, 1997	✗	✗
BS Dragon Quest I	BSドラゴンクエストI (also BSドラクエI)	4	February 4, 1996; February 11, 1996; February 18, 1996; February 25, 1996	✓	✓
BS Fire Emblem: Akaneia Senki	BS Faiā Emuburemu Akaneia Senki-hen (BSファイアーエムブレム アカネイア戦記編)	4	September 28, 1997; October 5, 1997; October 12, 1997; October 19, 1997	✓	✓
BS F-Zero Grand Prix 2	BS F-ZERO グランプリ2	2	August 10, 1997; August 17, 1997	✓	✓
BS F-Zero	BS F-ZERO	4	December 29, 1996; January 5, 1997; January 12, 1997; January 19, 1997	✓	✓
BS Harvest Moon	BS Bokujō Monogatari (BS牧場物語)	4	September 2, 1996; September 9, 1996; September 16, 1996; September 23, 1996	✓	✓
BS Ihatovo Monogatari	BSイーハトーヴォ物語	4	March 2, 1997; March 9, 1997; March 16, 1997; March 23, 1997	✓	✓
BS Marvelous: Camp Arnold	BSマーヴェラス キャンプアーノルド	4	November 3, 1996; November 10, 1996; November 17, 1996; November 24, 1996	✓	✓
BS Marvelous: Time Athletics	BSマーヴェラス タイムアスレチック	4	January 7, 1996; January 14, 1996; January 21, 1996; January 28, 1996	✓	✓
BS Monopoly Course - The Road to Boardwalk	BS Monoporī Kōza Bōdowōku e no Michi (BSモノポリー講座~ボードウォークへの道)	4	December 3, 1995; December 10, 1995; December 17, 1995; December 24, 1995	✓	✗
BS Nichibutsu Mahjong Practice	BS Nichibutsu Mājan Renshū Mājan (BSニチブツマージャン練習麻雀)	2	January 26, 1997; February 2, 1997	✓	✗
BS Shin Onigashima	BS Shin Onigashima (BS新・鬼ヶ島)	4	September 29, 1996; October 6, 1996; October 13, 1996; October 20, 1996	✓	✓
BS Shiren the Wanderer Save Surla	BS Fūrai no Shiren Surara o Sukue (BS風来のシレン スララを救え)	4	April 28, 1996; May 5, 1996; May 11, 1996; May 19, 1996	✓	✓
BS SimCity City Building Contest	BS SimCity Machizukuri Taikai (BS SimCity 街作り大会)	4	August 4, 1996; August 11, 1996; August 18, 1996; August 25, 1996	✓	✓
BS Spriggan Powered	BSスプリガン・パワード	5	May 26, 1996; June 30, 1996; July 7, 1996; July 14, 1996; July 21, 1996	✓	✗
BS Super Mario Collection	BSスーパーマリオコレクション	4	December 28, 1997; January 4, 1998; January 11, 1998; January 18, 1998	✓	✓
BS Super Mario USA Power Challenge	BSスーパーマリオUSA パワーチャレンジ	5	March 31, 1996; April 7, 1996; April 14, 1996; April 21, 1996	✓	✓
BS Detective Club: The Past that Disappeared in the Snow	BS Tantei Kurabu Yuki ni Kieta Kako (BS探偵倶楽部 雪に消えた過去)	3	February 9, 1997; February 16, 1997; February 23, 1997	✓	✓
BS The Legend of Zelda	BS Zeruda no Densetsu (BSゼルダの伝説)	4	August 9, 1995; August 16, 1995; August 23, 1995; August 30, 1995	✓	✓
BS The Legend of Zelda Map 2	BS Zeruda no Densetsu Map 2 (BSゼルダの伝説MAP2)	4	December 30, 1995; January 1, 1996; January 3, 1996; January 5, 1996	✓	✓
BS The Legend of Zelda: Ancient Stone Tablets	BS Zeruda no Densetsu: Inishie no Sekiban (BSゼルダの伝説 古代の石盤)	4	March 30, 1997; April 6, 1997; April 13, 1997; April 20, 1997	✓	✓
BS Torneko no Daibouken		canceled			
Chaos Seed – Feng Shui Corridor	Kaosu Shīdo -Fūsui Kairouki- (カオスシード ~風水回廊記~) (also CHAOS SEED 風水回廊記)	1	May 5, 1996	✗	✗
Child Research Team Mighty Pockets Survey	Kodomo Chōsadan Maiti Pokettsu Chōsa (子供調査団マイティポケッツ 調査)	3	September 7, 1997; September 14, 1997; March 22, 1998	✓	✓
Chrono Trigger Jet Bike Special	クロノトリガー ジェットバイクスペシャル	1	1995	✗	✗
Cock-A-Doodle-Doo (RPG Maker Super Dante)	Kukku-Du-Duru-Du (RPG Tsukūru Super Dante) (クック･ドゥ・ドゥル・ドゥー(RPGツクールSUPER_DANTE))	1	April 4, 1996	✗	✗
Cu-On-Pa	クオンパ	1	June 29, 1997	✗	✗
Big Laugh!! Life Theater	Daibakushō!! Jinsei Gekijō (大爆笑!!人生劇場)	1		✗	✗
Dezaemon BS Version – Amazing Shooting	Dezaemon BS-ban Sugoi Shūtingu (デザエモンBS版 凄いシューティング)	2		✗	✓
Dezaemon BS Version – BS-X Shooting	Dezaemon BS-ban BS-X Shūtingu (デザエモンBS版 BS-Xシューティング)	1	April 4, 1996	✗	✓
Dokapon Gaiden – Trial by Fire	Dokapon Gaiden - Honō no Ōdishon - (ドカポン外伝 ~炎のオーディション~)	1	December 1, 1996	✗	✗
DoReMi Original Story SoundWitch Blue SoundWitch	DoReMi-ya no Orijinaru SaundoWitchi Burū SaundoWitchi (ドレミ屋のオリジナル・サウンドウィッチ ブルー・サウンドウィッチ)	1	September 21, 1997	✓	✗
DoReMi Original Story SoundWitch Power SoundWitch	DoReMi-ya no Orijinaru SaundoWitchi Pawā SaundoWitchi (ドレミ屋のオリジナル・サウンドウィッチ パワー・サウンドウィッチ)	1	September 23, 1997	✓	✗
Dragon Slayer: The Legend of Heroes	Doragon Sureiyā Eiyū Densetsu (ドラゴンスレイヤー英雄伝説)	1	August 31, 1997	✗	✗
Dr. Mario	ドクターマリオ	1	March 30, 1997	✗	✗
Dynami Tracer	ダイナマイ・トレーサー	1	January 27, 1996	✗	✓
Excitebike Buzz Mario Battle Stadium	EkisaitoBaiku BunBun Mario Batoru Sutajiamu (エキサイトバイク ぶんぶんマリオバトルスタジアム)	5	May 11, 1997; May 18, 1997; November 2, 1997; November 9, 1997	✓	✓
F-Zero	F-ZERO	1	December 1, 1996	✗	✓
F-Zero 2 Practice	F-ZERO2プラクティス	1	June 1, 1997	✗	✓
Golf Lover! Out of Bounds Club	Gorufu Daisuki! O.B. Kurabu (ゴルフ大好き!O.B.倶楽部)	1	April 27, 1997	✗	✓
Heisei Stratego	Heisei GunjinShougi (平成軍人将棋)	1	January 1997	✗	✗
The Fortress of Fury	Ikari no Yousai (怒りの要塞)	1		✗	✗
Jewel of Life (RPG Maker Super Dante)	(JEWEL OF LIVE(RPGツクール SUPER DANTE))	3	May 1, 1996; June 2, 1996	✗	✓
Cyber Citizen Shockman Zero	Kaizou Chōnin Shubibinman Zero (改造町人シュビビンマン零)	1	March 30, 1997	✗	✓
Ken-chan to Chie Asobi	ケンちゃんとちえあそび	1	July 13, 1997	✓	✓
Kirby's Toy Box	Kabii no Omochabako (カービィのおもちゃ箱)	8	February 8, 1996	✗	✓
KlockWorx	クロックワークス	1	November 18, 1995	✗	✗
Konae-chan's Heartbeating Penguin Family	KONAE-chan no DokiDoki Penguin Kazoku (KONAEチャンのどきどきペンギン家族)	2	November 2, 1995; December 1, 1995	✓	✓
Love is a Balance – For Example, K-kun's Busy Day	Koi wa Baransu Tatoeba K-kun no Tabou na Ichinichi-hen (恋はバランス たとえばK君の多忙な一日編)	1	January 27, 1996	✗	✓
Lemmings	レミングス	1	December 1, 1996	✗	✗
Let's Play Pachinko Silver Balls	Let's Pachinko Nante Gintama (Let'sパチンコなんて銀玉)	4		✗	✗
Lord Monarch	ロードモナーク	1	December 20, 1997	✗	✗
Mario Paint BS Version	Mario Peinto BS-ban (マリオペイントBS版)	1	August 3, 1997	✗	✓
Mario Paint Winner Included Version	Mario Peinto Yūshō Naizō Ban (マリオペイント優勝内蔵版)	4	December 28, 1997; November 2, 1997; December 28, 1997; December 31, 1997	✗	✓
National Championship Betting Finals 2	Zenkoku Baken Ōja Ketteisen 2 (全国馬券王者決定戦2)	7	January 25, 1998; January 26, 1998; January 27, 1998; January 28, 1998; January 29, 1998; January 30, 1998; January 31, 1998	✓	✓
Naxat Cup Satellaview Bass "Big Fight" Tournament	ナグザットカップ サテラビュー・バス・トーナメント"BIG FIGHT"	4	December 6, 1995; December 13, 1995; December 20, 1995; December 27, 1995	✓	✓
New 3D Golf Simulation: Waiale no Kiseki	Waialae no Kiseki (ワイアラエの奇蹟)		October 26, 1997; October 27, 1997; October 28, 1997		✗
New Yatterman Yajiro-be Enduarance Challenge	New Yattāman Nandai Kandai Yajirobē (NEW ヤッターマン 難題かんだいヤジロベエ)	1	May 5, 1996	✗	✗
Nichibutsu Mahjong	ニチブツマージャン	2		✗	✗
Nintama Rantarō 2	忍たま乱太郎2	1	March, 1996	✗	✗
Panel de Pon Event '98	パネルでポン イベント'98	1	December 28, 1997	✗	✗
Parlor! Parlor	Parlor!パーラー	2	March 1, 1998; March 8, 1998	✓	✓
PICO PICO Pirates	PICO PICO パイレーツ	1	August 2, 1995	✗	✓
Radical Dreamers	ラジカルドリーマーズ	1	February 3, 1996	✗	✓
R's Study	R no Shosai (Rの書斎)	2	June 1, 1997; June 8, 1997	✓	✓
R's Study – Second Act	R no Shosai - Dai Ni Maku (Rの書斎 第二幕)	2	November 30, 1997; December 7, 1997	✓	✓
Satella de Picross	Satella de Picross (サテラdeピクロス)	1	November 30, 1997	✗	✓
SatellaQ 1999 Thanks for your help last year. This year too please quiz!	Saterakyū Ichikyūkyūkyū Kyūnenchū wa Osewa ni Narimashita. Kotoshi mo YoroshiKuIzu! (サテラQ 1QQQ Q年中はお世話になりました。今年もよろしクイズ!)	1	January 1, 1999	✓	✓
SatellaQ Brain Cooler! Summer Festival	Saterakyū - Nōryō! Natsumatsuri (サテラQ 脳涼!夏祭り)	1	July 28, 1996	✓	✓
SatellaQ Children's Koshien	Saterakyū - Kyūji-tachi no Kōshien (サテラQ Q児たちの甲子園)	1	August 3, 1997	✓	✓
SatellaQ Farewell to year Heisei 9 (1997): The End-Of-Year Closing of Accounts!	Saterakyū - Sayonara Heisei Kyū Nen - Nenmatsu Sōkessan! (サテラQ さよなら平成Q年 年末総決算!)	1	December 21, 1997	✓	✓
SatellaQ End-of-Year Jumbo Treasure Quiz	Satera Q Nenmatsu Janbo Takara Kuizu (サテラQ 年末ジャンボ宝クイズ)	4	December 1, 1996; December 8, 1996; December 15, 1996; December 22, 1996	✓	✓
SatellaQ It's Nearly Spring – How About a Little SateQuiz?	Saterakyū - Mō sugu Haru desu ne ~Chotto Satekyū shimasen ka~? (サテラQ もうすぐ春ですね~ ちょっとサテQしませんか~?)	1	March 15, 1998	✓	✓
SatellaQ Japan Series Bottom of the 9th, 2 Outs, Bases Loaded! So why a quiz!	Saterakyū Nihon Shirīzu Kyū Kai Ura Tsū Auto Manrui! Nazeka Sukuizu! (サテラQ 日本シリーズQ回裏2アウト満塁!なぜかスクイズ!)	1	October 26, 1997	✓	✓
SatellaQ MusiQ Fair	サテラQ ミュージッQフェア	1	February 1, 1998	✓	✓
SatellaQ The National Quiz-day	Saterakyū - Kokumin no Kyūjitsu (サテラQ 国民のQ日)	1	May 4, 1997	✓	✓
SatellaQ Congratulations on your Promotion, 9th-grade sparks!	Saterakyū - Shinkyū Omedetō - Pikapika no Kyūnensei! (サテラQ 進Qおめでとう ピカピカのQ年生!)	1	March 28, 1999	✓	✓
SatellaQ Q-1 Grand Prix Midsummer Revenge	Saterakyū Q-1 GuranPuri Manatsu no Ribenji (サテラQ Q-1グランプリ 真夏のリベンジ)	1	July 26, 1998	✓	✓
SatellaQ The Straight Pitch! The Changing Pitch! !	Saterakyū - Chokkyū! Henkakyū! (サテラQ 直Q!変化Q!)	1	June 15, 1997	✓	✓
Satellawalker 2	サテラウォーカー2	4	February 15, 1998; February 22, 1998; June 29, 1997; July 6, 1997	✓	✓
Shanghai Great Wall	Shanhai Banri no Chōjō (上海 万里の長城)	1		✗	✗
Shigesato Itoi's No. 1 Bass Fishing – National Spring Tournament	Itoi Shigesato no Basu Tsuri No. 1 Haru no Zenkoku Tōnamento (糸井重里のバス釣りNo.1 春の全国トーナメント)	4	April 27, 1997; May 25, 1997	✓	✓
Shigesato Itoi's No. 1 Bass Fishing – Sound Journal	Itoi Shigesato no Basu Tsuri No. 1 Saundo Jānaru (糸井重里のバス釣りNo.1 サウンドジャーナル)	1	August 24, 1997; August 27, 1997; November 23, 1997; November 26, 1997	✓	✓
Shigesato Itoi's No. 1 Bass Fishing – Summer Practice	Itoi Shigesato no Basu Tsuri No. 1 Natsu no Purakutisu (糸井重里のバス釣りNo.1 夏のプラクティス)	1	July 20, 1997	✓	✓
Sound Journal for Lovers	Saundo Jānaru for Lovers (サウンドジャーナル For Lovers)	2	February 8, 1998; February 11, 1998	✓	✓
Sound Journal	サウンドジャーナル	6	October 27, 1996; October 28, 1996; October 29, 1996; October 30, 1996; October 31, 1996; November 1, 1996	✓	✓
Special Tee Shot	スペシャルティーショット	1	December 1, 1996	✗	✓
Bakushō Mondai's Assault of the StarPirates	Bakushō Mondai no Totsugeki Sutā Pairētsu (爆笑問題の突撃スターパイレーツ)	4	June 22, 1997; July 27, 1997; August 31, 1997; September 21, 1997	✓	✓
Super E.D.F.	SUPER E.D.F.	1	August 31, 1997	✗	✗
Super Famicom Wars BS Version	Sūpā Famikon Wōzu BS-ban (スーパーファミコンウォーズ BS版)	4	March 1, 1998; March 8, 1998; March 15, 1998; March 22, 1998	✗	✓
Super Gussun Oyoyo 2	Sūpā Gussun Oyoyo 2 (すーぱーぐっすんおよよ2)	1		✗	✗
Super Mahjong Tournament	Sūpā Mājan Taikai (スーパー麻雀大会)	1	June 29, 1997	✗	✗
Super Ninja-Kun	(す〜ぱ〜忍者くん)	1	June 29, 1997	✗	✗
Super Puyo Puyo 2 Remix	す〜ぱ〜ぷよぷよ通 リミックス	1	February, 1996	✗	✗
Super Shogi Problem 1000	Sūpā Tsume Shōgi 1000 (スーパー詰将棋1000)	1	November 30, 1997	✗	✗
Sutte Hakkun '98 Event Version	すってはっくん 98イベントバージョン	1	December 20, 1998	✗	✓
Sutte Hakkun Event Version	すってはっくん イベントバージョン	3	October, 1997	✗	✓
Tamori no Picross	Tamori no Picross (タモリのピクロス)	10	April 23 to September 2, 1995	✗	✓
Takara Cup Sumo Satellite	Takara-hai Ōzumō Eisei Basho (タカラ杯 大相撲 衛星場所)	4	June 2, 1996; June 23, 1996; June 9, 1996; June 16, 1996	✓	
The Legend of Zelda: Triforce of the Gods	Zeruda no Densetsu: Kamigami no Toraifōsu (ゼルダの伝説 神々のトライフォース)	1	March 2, 1997	✗	✗
Treasure Conflix	トレジャーコンフリクス	1	February 10, 1996	✗	✓
Umataro Gennarin Daibōken (RPG Maker Super Dante)	(うまたろうゲンナリンだいぼうけん(RPGツクールSUPER_DANTE))	1	June 1, 1996	✗	✓
Valuable Part Megaton Punch	Kachiwari Megaton Panchi (かちわりメガトンパンチ)	1		✗	✗
Waiwai de Q	Waiwai de Q (わいわいでQ)	4	October 7, 1995; October 14, 1995; October 21, 1995; October 28, 1995	✓	✓
Waiwai de Q – Aki no Daikanshasai!	Waiwai de Q - Aki no Daikanshasai! (わいわいでQ 秋の大感謝祭!)	5	November 1, 1995; November 8, 1995; November 15, 1995; November 22, 1995; November 29, 1995	✓	✓
Waiwai de Q – Haru no Saiten Special	Waiwai de Q - Haru no Saiten Supesharu (わいわいでQ 春の採点スペシャル)	4	March 7, 1996; March 14, 1996; March 21, 1996; March 27, 1996	✓	✓
Wario's Woods	Wario no Mori (ワリオの森)	1	September 28, 1997	✗	✓
Wild Guns	ワイルドガンズ	1		✗	✗
Wizardry 5	ウィザードリィ5	1	August 31, 1997	✗	✗
Yoshi's Panepon BS Version	Yosshī no PanePon BS-ban (ヨッシーのパネポンBS版)	1	November 3, 1996	✗	✓
Yot-chan to Chie Asobi	(よっちゃんとちえあそび)	1	December 14, 1997	✓	✓
Zoo and Mahjong	Zūtto Mājan (ZOOっと麻雀)	2		✗	✓

== Broadcast data list ==
Lit. English title	Japanese title	Unique broadcast weeks	Broadcast date(s)
Chrono Trigger Character Library	Kurono Torigā Kyarakutā Zukan (クロノトリガー キャラクター図鑑)	1	
Chrono Trigger Music Library	クロノトリガー ミュージックライブラリ	1	
DerbyStal '96 Nintendo Breeders Cup Horse Data	DabiSuta 96 Nintendō Burīdāzu Kappu-yō Uma Dēta (ダビスタ96 任天堂ブリーダーズカップ用 馬データ)	7	
DerbyStal '96 Nintendo Breeders Cup "Qualifying Tournament" Race Data	DabiSuta 96 Nintendō Burīdāzu Kappu "Yosen Taikai" Rēsu Dēta (ダビスタ96 任天堂ブリーダーズカップ「予選大会」レースデータ)	7	
Derby Stallion '96-compatible Additional Data	Dābī Sutarion 96 Taiō Tsuika Dēta (ダービースタリオン96対応 追加データ)	1	
Derby Stallion '96-compatible G1 Race Simulation	Dābī Sutarion 96 Taiō G1 Mogi Resu (ダービースタリオン96対応 G1模擬レース)	3	
Derby Stallion '96-compatible Stallion Data	Dābī Sutarion 96 Taiō Shuboba Dēta (ダービースタリオン96対応 種牡馬データ)	7	
Invincible Mahjong Tenpai Watch Data	Jōshō Mājan Tenpai Kansen Dēta (常勝麻雀 天牌 観戦データ)	12	
Music Maker-compatible Conversion Data	Ongaku Tsukūru Taiō Konbāto Dēta (音楽ツクール対応 コンバートデータ)	1	April 22, 1996
Music Maker-compatible Score Data	Ongaku Tsukūru Taiō Sukoa Dēta (音楽ツクール対応 スコアデータ)	8	August 3, 1997; August 24, 1997
RPG Maker 2-compatible Data	RPG Tsukūru 2 Taiō Dēta (RPGツクール2対応データ)	1	June 1, 1996; June 30, 1996
RPG Maker 2-compatible Data: Hard Race	RPG Tsukūru 2 Taiō Dēta Kurekure MōResu (RPGツクール2対応データ くれくれ猛レース)	4	April 22, 1996
RPG Maker 2-compatible Data: Jewel of Life 3	RPG Tsukūru 2 Taiō Dēta Jewel Of Live 3 (RPGツクール2対応データ JEWEL OF LIVE3)	4	April 22, 1996
RPG Maker 2-compatible Data: Organic Stone	(RPGツクール2対応データ オーガニックストーン)	2	June 30, 1996
RPG Maker 2-compatible Data: Ryouba de Yuku!	RPG Tsukūru 2 - Ryōma de Yuku! (RPGツクール2対応データ 龍馬でゆく!)	9	September 29, 1996; December 1, 1996; December 8, 1996
Satellite Broadcast Data-compatible Cassette "SameGame" Panel Editor	Eiseihōsō Taiō Kasetto "SameGame" Koma Editā (衛星放送対応カセット「鮫 亀」 駒エディター)	9	
SD Gundam G-Next-compatible Data	SD Gandamu G Next Taiō Dēta (SDガンダム G NEXT対応データ)	7	
Sound-Novel Maker-compatible Data	Saundo Noberu Tsukūru Taiō Dēta (サウンドノベルツクール対応データ)	4	June 30, 1996; August 3, 1997

== Broadcast magazine list ==
Lit. English title	Japanese title	Unique broadcast weeks	Broadcast date(s)	SoundLink support
1st BS Satellaview Cup SataSpor	Daiikkai BS Saterabyū-hai SateSupo (第1回BSサテラビュー杯 サテスポ)	7		✗
1st BS Satellaview Cup SataSports DX	Daiikkai BS Saterabyū-hai SateSupo DX (第1回BSサテラビュー杯 サテスポ DX)	4		✗
3 O'Clock Wide Award	Sanji no Wide Shō (3時のWIDE賞)	8	May 31, 1998—December 6, 1998	✗
Akamatsu Yuusuke Theater	Akamatsu Yūsuke Gekijō (赤松裕介劇場)	1		✗
As a person	Hito toshite (人として)	1		✗
B Dash	B DASH	5	November 15, 1998; November 22, 1998; December 20, 1998	✗
Cheap de Gorgeous	チープdeゴージャス	8	May 10, 1998—December 6, 1998	✗
Columbus' Egg	Koronbusu no Tamagoyaki (コロンブスの卵焼き)	4		✗
Cross Review World	クロス・レビュー・ワールド	1		✗
DanDan Conveyor Belt	だんだんベルトコンベアー	6	March 29, 1998—August 30, 1998	✗
Days	DAYS	1		✗
Digital Magazine Busters BS	デジタルマガジン バスターズBS	25	October 5, 1997—March 29, 1998	✗
Dish Pong!	o-Ryōri Pon! (お料理ポン!)	4	November, 1997; December, 1997; January, 1998; February, 1998	✗
Do-Re-Mi-Fa!	DoReMi de Fa~! (ドレミでふぁ~!)	41	March 30, 1997—January 18, 1998	✗
Do-Re-Mi-Fa 2!	DoReMi de Fa 2~!) (ドレミでふぁ2~!)	17	January 25, 1998—September 20, 1998	✗
Dr. Jon G's Office	Yun Gu-hakase no Shinsatsu Shitsu (ユン・グ博士の診察室)	4	June 28, 1998; August 2, 1998; August 30, 1998; September 6, 1998	✗
Famitsū Kawara-ban	ファミ通 かわら版	1		✗
Fenek	FENEK	10	June 1, 1997—March 20, 1998	✗
Game Tiger's Big Lair	Gēmu Tora no Ōana (ゲーム虎の大穴)	69	April 24, 1995—July 15, 1995	✓
Game Tiger's Big Lair Special	Gēmu Tora no Ōana Supesharu (ゲーム虎の大穴スペシャル)	222	July 17, 1995—March 30, 1996	✓
Game Tiger's Super Big Lair	Gēmu Tora no Chōōana (ゲーム虎の超大穴)	104	March 31, 1996—March 23, 1997	✓
Game Tiger's Super Big Lair (Special Edition)	Gēmu Tora no Chōōana (Tokubetsuhen) (ゲーム虎の超大穴(特別編))	17	December 30, 1996—December 31, 1996; July 20, 1997—September 27, 1997; November 16, 1997—November 20, 1997; March 29, 1998	✓
Gator Bait	Wani no Esa (ワニのエサ)	1		✗
Goods Press	グッズプレス	12	April 27, 1997—March 15, 1998	✗
Game Tiger's Seal of Approval	Gemu Tora no Taikoban (ゲーム虎の太鼓判)	53	March 28, 1998—March 28, 1999	✗
Hikaru Ijuin's Bizarre Radio Transmitting Station School Eerie Story	Ijūin Hikaru no Kaidenpa Hasshin Kichi: Gakkō de atta Kowai o-Hanashi (伊集院光の怪電波発信基地・学校であったこわいお話)	1		✗
Lily Franky Theater	Rirī Furanki Gekijō (リリー・フランキー劇場)	1	August 15, 1995 – March 30, 1996	✗
City Magazine	Machi Maga (街マガ)	1		✗
City Magazine Idol Diary Media Strawberry	Machi Magajin: Aidoru Nikki Media Sutoroberī (街マガジン・アイドル日記 メディア・ストロベリー)	1		✗
Monthly Coin Toss: Pokémon Card Game Magazine	Gekkan Koin Tosu ~Pokemon Kādo Gēmu Magajin~ (月刊コイントス~ポケモンカードゲームマガジン~)	6	April 12, 1998—September 13, 1998	✗
Naba-chan's Music Information Research Office	NABA-chan no Ongakujōhōchōsashitsu (NABAちゃんの音楽情報調査室)	1		✗
New Magazine Show Announcement	Shin Magajin Bangumi no o-Shirase (新マガジン番組のお知らせ)	1	March 22, 1998	✗
Nintendo HP	任天堂HP	3	March 29, 1998	✗
Nintendo Power Magazine (also NP Magazine)	NINTENDO POWER Magazine	9	March 29, 1998—December 6, 1998	✗
No. 1 Bass Fishing Magazine	Basu Tsuri No.1 Magajin (バス釣りNo.1マガジン)	3		✗
Omnibus	Soushuuhen (総集編)	1	October 25, 1998	✗
One-Shot Reversal	Ippatsugyakuten (一発逆転)	1		✗
Otaku Man Beauty	オタクマンビューティー	1		✗
PokeCam Magazine	ポケカメマガジン	3	March 29, 1998	✗
Public Sweepstakes Magazine	Kōbo Kenshō Magajin (公募・懸賞マガジン)	2	March 29, 1998; May 3, 1998	✗
Rankings Magazine	ランキングマガジン	1		✗
Return of Freud	Furoito no Gyakushū (フロイトの逆襲)	7	May 17, 1998	✗
SatellaQ Answer Announcement Magazine	Saterakyū Seikai Happyō Magajin (サテラQ正解発表マガジン)	1		✗
Satellaview Magazine	Saterabyū Tsūshin (サテラビュー通信)	1		✗
Satellite Fair	Sateraito Mihon'ichi (サテライト見本市)	4	October 11, 1998; October 18, 1998; November 18, 1998; December 12, 1998	✗
Scent of Aniki	Aniki no Kaori (兄キの香り)	1		✗
Shitamachi Human Nature Series: Master!	Shitamachi Ninjō Shirīzu: Oyakatah! (下町人情シリーズ・親方っ!)	1		✗
Sousa Sentai Wappers	Sōsa Sentai Wappāzu (捜査戦怠ワッパーズ)	6	April 19, 1998—September 20, 1998	✗
As a Spaceman in 2001	2001-nen Uchū no Hito toshite (2001年宇宙の人として)	1		✗
St.GIGA PG	St.GIGA PG	1	September 27, 1998	✗
Tiger Magazine Battle	Tora Maga Daisakusen (虎マガ大作戦)	52	March 30, 1997—March 22, 1998	✗
Tora no Maki		2		✗
Travel Magazine – Thorough Travel	Tabi Magajin ~Tokoton Travel~ (旅まがじん~とことんTravel~)	6	April 5, 1998—September 6, 1998	✗
Various Information on Rumors! Media Chimpanzees	Uwasa no Jōhō Baraeti! Media Chinpanjī (噂の情報バラエティ!メディア・チンパンジー)	1		✗
View Cinema Paradise	ビュー・シネマ・パラダイス	6	October 18, 1998—December 20, 1998	✗
WaiWai Check	ワイワイチェック	2		✗
Weekly Buss	Shūkan BUSS (週間BUSS)	1		✗
Zubari	ずばり	4	September 29, 1998; November 1, 1998; November 29, 1998; December 27, 1998	✗

== See also ==
- Satellaview games from The Legend of Zelda series
