= Satellaview games from The Legend of Zelda series =

Promotional advertisement for the BS Zelda games c. 1995

Between August 6, 1995 and May 30, 1999, Nintendo, in collaboration with St.GIGA, broadcast three different The Legend of Zelda titles to fans for download via the Super Famicom's Satellaview subsystem. BS Zelda no Densetsu, BS Zelda no Densetsu: MAP2, and BS Zelda no Densetsu: Inishie no Sekiban all featured SoundLink narration which was the first time that Nintendo-sponsored Zelda titles made use of voice-actors to provide vocal tracks. (Note: The earlier CD-i titles were not sponsored by Nintendo and are considered by fans to lack canonicity.) As the first SoundLink Game released via Satellaview, BS Zelda no Densetsu in particular was identified by Nintendo as the world's first integrated radio-game. Also broadcast during this time, starting on March 2, 1997, was a non-SoundLink port of The Legend of Zelda: A Link to the Past, known as Zelda no Densetsu: Kamigami no Triforce in Japan. Broadcasts of Kamigami no Triforce continued periodically throughout the tenure of Nintendo's partnership with St.GIGA (which ended on May 30, 1999), after which St.GIGA independently broadcast the game until May 29, 2000.

With the exception of Kamigami no Triforce all Zelda titles broadcast to the Satellaview were Satellaview-exclusive. Because the Satellaview was only released in Japan, these games were also all Japan-only releases. To date none of these titles have been released in any other form and due to the download limitations imposed on the broadcasts and the termination of support for the system these games are no longer available on the commercial market. Subsequent to the announcement at E3 2010 regarding the rerelease of BS Fire Emblem: Akaneia Senki (the first Satellaview-exclusive title to be re-released commercially) 10 years after the last Satellaview broadcast, there has been renewed speculation regarding the possibility of Nintendo's rerelease of the BS Zelda titles, but to date there has been no official announcement on the matter from Nintendo.

There has been much fan debate about whether or not the Zelda titles for the Satellaview (collectively known as the BS Zelda games) should be considered enhanced remakes or spin-off titles, whether or not their plots (different plots from the prior titles in 3 of the 4 Satellaview games) should be regarded as canonical or not, and if so where they should fit into the timeline of Zelda events.

== BS Zelda no Densetsu ==
BS Zelda no Densetsu
- Developer: Nintendo R&D2
- Publisher: St.GIGA
- Designers: Shigeru Miyamoto; Takashi Tezuka
- Series: The Legend of Zelda
- Platform: Satellaview
- Release: MAP1: JP: August 6, 1995; MAP2: JP: December 30, 1995
- Genre: Action-adventure
- Mode: Time-restricted single player with multiplayer scoreboards

BS Zelda no Densetsu (BSゼルダの伝説; lit. BS The Legend of Zelda) is an action-adventure game first broadcast to Satellaview owners in August 1995. It is the fifth game developed by Nintendo belonging to The Legend of Zelda series, but it does not feature Link, the protagonist of the prior four games. Instead it features the same main character that the player selects in the Satellaview game, BS-X, and indeed the games are linked functionally and roughly through plot. As such BS Zelda no Densetsu, together with BS Zelda no Densetsu: MAP2 and BS Zelda no Densetsu: Inishie no Sekiban, is generally considered to be a spin-off title from the main Zelda series. Stylistically similar to the original top-down The Legend of Zelda for the NES, but utilizing the 16-bit graphical capabilities of the SNES, BS Zelda no Densetsu is also occasionally regarded as an enhanced remake of the original game.

The game's title derives the "BS" portion of its name from the Broadcast Satellite system through which the game was transmitted by the distributor, St.GIGA, to Satellaview owners between the date of the first broadcast (in August 1995) and the last broadcast (in January 1997). As the Satellaview's first SoundLink Game, broadcasts for BS Zelda no Densetsu were composed of both a discretely quantifiable portion of game code and a continually streaming vocal track. Employing the voices of voice actors, BS Zelda no Densetsu became the world's first integrated radio-game and it marks the first time that a Zelda title released by Nintendo would utilize spoken dialog.

The game was broadcast a total of 5 times and several broadcasts were associated with special nationwide-contests and prizes. The game's popularity among Satellaview players prompted the development of BS Zelda no Densetsu: MAP2 - a remixed version of BS Zelda no Densetsu providing a functional analog to the original The Legend of Zelda's "Second Quest".

=== Plot ===
BS Zelda no Densetsu is set chronologically close in time to A Link to the Past. Although neither of the two stories makes direct reference to the other, the back-story given at the start of the game is substantially identical. The back-story explains that the Gods had created a holy golden triangle called the Triforce which would grant the wishes of anyone who possessed it. Ganondorf, the evil boss of a gang of thieves, located the Triforce and was transformed into Ganon, meanwhile his baleful influence spread across the land of Hyrule. The Gods sent word by messenger that a holy sword would be required to stop this evil, so the King of Hyrule commissioned such a sword. After it was completed the Hyrulians discovered that nobody could wield the sword and so the king set his 7 sages to work creating a seal to seal Ganon away until such time as a hero would be born who could wield the holy blade. Not long afterward, Ganon escaped and managed to kidnap the King's daughter, Princess Zelda.

As luck would have it, on a Sunday a few days later, a youth from the far away Town Whose Name Has Been Stolen (それは名前を盗まれた街, Sore wa Namae o Nusumareta Machi) entered a fabulous portal in a fortune teller's tent and emerged in the dark of a distant land. Following the stars, the child traveled until at last arriving in the land of Hyrule. Entering a nearby cave the child met an Old Man who armed the youth with a sword and explained the predicament in which Hyrule found itself. The child set out to recover the 8 fragments of Triforce hidden deep in dangerous dungeons. After collecting them and reconstructing the Triforce, the child recovered the holy Master Sword, fought Ganon, and slew him to recover another segment of the Triforce. The child then rescued Princess Zelda and returned to the Town Whose Name Has Been Stolen.

Throughout the adventure the youth's efforts were repeatedly frustrated by the inability to progress further. Due to the unstable nature of the magic associated with the fortune teller's portal, the youth's heroic quests in Hyrule were only possible for a one-hour period known as Zelda Time (ゼルダTIME). At the end of the hour the hero would be whisked away back to the City Whose Name Has Been Stolen and the portal would not regain its magical ability to transport the child to Hyrule until the following Sunday.

To make matters easier for the youth, however, the Old Man that dwelt in the first cave the youth had discovered kept track of all of the youth's money and inventory items so that the youth could recover them again and take up from roughly the same position. Additionally, the Old Man was capable of telepathic communication with the hero and could grant the child magical abilities for short periods of time by researching spells in tomes of forbidden magic. The Old Man's ability to see clairvoyantly also enabled him to sense when certain plot elements were occurring such as the kidnapping of the great fairy or the washing up of useful items by the seashore. These events would be relayed to the hero telepathically.

=== Gameplay ===
The gameplay dynamics of BS Zelda no Densetsu (and BS Zelda no Densetsu: MAP2) are most closely comparable to those of the first The Legend of Zelda, but a few major differences exist between Zelda and BS Zelda which make the two play-through experiences distinctly different. Foremost among these differences is the use of SoundLink data to supplement and provide plot for BS Zelda.

As the world's first satellite-based integrated radio-game, BS Zelda's implementation of the streaming SoundLink broadcasts represented an early approach to dealing with the difficulty of meaningfully connecting vocal files to character actions. As such, unlike the later BS Zelda no Densetsu: Inishie no Sekiban that allows players to continue moving during SoundLink messages, when the in-game clock hits certain times in BS Zelda the game pauses to display a message reading "Listen closely" (耳をすませ). During this time, players would hear the voice of the narrator (Kiyoshi Kobayashi - playing the part of the Old Man) grant the player magical abilities or warn of events occurring elsewhere in the Land of Hyrule. During other periods of paused gameplay such as during the introduction and end sequences, fully voiced plot details relating to Princess Zelda (voiced by Naomi Fujisawa) and Ganon (voiced by Seizō Katō) were also broadcast.

In order to allow the proper pacing of plot elements revealed in vocal files, the game progresses according to a strict time-based system. An onscreen clock displaying "Zelda Time" can be seen at all times and because the game is played in real-time, the time cannot be paused even if the game is paused. At various points in "Zelda Time" certain pre-set plot events occur. These events range from the death or stunning of all enemies in a room, or the appearance of fairies, to occasional weapons/munition upgrades allowing the use of more powerful versions of items and/or the unlimited use of items for a limited time.

The game was divided in fourths and broadcast in episodic installments (with the only subtitle being the standard Satellaview suffix, Episode X (第X話, dai X wa) where X was a number between 1 and 4). Each episode limited players to a certain restricted playing area either by withholding necessary items or by using obstacles on the overworld map that would be removed in later episodes. This ensured that players would experience a paced gameplay experience and allowed for a closer tailoring of SoundLink plot details to the events unfolding in new areas of the overworld map. The overworld in BS Zelda was altered from the 8 by 16 map used in the original The Legend of Zelda to an 8 by 8 grid, although an effort to make Map 1 roughly comparable in terms of general landscape features to the overworld in Zelda is apparent.

As in The Legend of Zelda's Second Quest, dungeons are again completely different. Consequently, BS Zelda is sometimes referred to as a "Third Quest" in reference to The Legend of Zelda's Second Quest. BS Zelda: MAP2 could thus be considered the "Fourth Quest". Carrying on the tradition initiated in the Second Quest where the dungeon map layouts spelled "ZELDA", Third Quest layout spells "St.GIGA" and the Fourth Quest spells "NiNtENDO".

Unlike the original Zelda, in BS Zelda the player's name and gender were selected in the Satellaview game-selection interface, BS-X. This initial selection then carried across to the game. The characters themselves are nameless in-game and are referred to by the narrator as either "child" or "youth".

Other differences between Zelda and BS Zelda include an increase in the maximum number of rupees allowed a player from 255 to more than a thousand, and the addition of a score that was tallied when gameplay ended at the expiration of "Zelda Time". Score tallies were calculated based on an algorithm factoring in such elements as whether or not Ganon had been slain, how many pieces of Triforce had been collected, number of restarts, number of hearts lost, and number of rupees collected. As each rupee represents one point in the final score tallied at the end of a play-through, the number of rupees collected often was of central importance in achieving high-scores needed to win prizes during special competition runs.

=== Development ===
From the earliest days of the Satellaview, the intention was to provide an opportunity for players "from Kyūshū to Hokkaidō" to enjoy two-way communication and involvement with a communication system allowing multiplayer netplay. While the earliest broadcasts for the Satellaview included solo-play games and strictly time-linked SoundLink Magazines that gave a sense of the player's direct temporal connection to the broadcasting center, St.GIGA, Nintendo's goal of simultaneous involvement between and amongst players was thought to be lacking. For this reason Nintendo began sponsoring a series of student networking projects to develop a network game that would let home consumers interact with each other over the satellite broadcasting system. The result of this networking project was the world's first integrated radio-game (or SoundLink Game) - BS Zelda.

As a programming project, BS Zelda was considered by students to be exceptionally difficult due to the strict quality control imposed by Nintendo. The game was to have no interactive lag and no programming bugs of any kind. The project went through at least two beta versions prior to release. On final release the game was divided into 4 episodes each of which would be available for download only during a narrow 1-hour window. Simultaneously streaming "SoundLink" vocal files would be broadcast to players to provide an expanded fully orchestrated musical score as well as plot narration. These vocal tracks were far too large for the 8M ROM capacity of the Satellaview, however as streaming files they were only temporarily stored as RAM which was then over-written as the game progressed. Although players would not be able to play a true multiplayer game as only 1 player could be displayed in the overworld at one time, the goal of a sense of inter-player community was achieved by linking all BS Zelda players to a common real-world time-frame, by making in-game references to the idea of other players, and by including a game score and password system that allowed the publishing of ranking tables and the competition of players against one another for prizes awarded by St.GIGA. The serialized structure together with the strength of the Zelda franchise was intended to encourage Satellaview sales and viewership and to establish fan loyalty.

First announced during an early July 1995 SoundLink Magazine broadcast of Hikaru Ijuin's King of Summer (夏休みの王様, Natsuyasumi no Ō-sama), the official BS Zelda pre-release party was hosted by Hikari Ōta and took place during the August 3, 1995 SoundLink Magazine broadcast of Bakushō Mondai, and the first episode of BS Zelda was released on Sunday August 6, 1995 with new episodes broadcast every subsequent Sunday through the 27th. The game was re-broadcast on at least 4 subsequent occasions as reruns throughout the lifetime of the Satellaview.

==== Broadcast dates ====
Date	Chapter title	Notes
August 6, 1995	BS The Legend of Zelda: Episode 1 (BSゼルダの伝説 第1話, BS Zelda no Densetsu: Dai 1 Wa)	Original release
August 13, 1995	BS The Legend of Zelda: Episode 2 (BSゼルダの伝説 第2話, BS Zelda no Densetsu: Dai 2 Wa)	Original release
August 20, 1995	BS The Legend of Zelda: Episode 3 (BSゼルダの伝説 第3話, BS Zelda no Densetsu: Dai 3 Wa)	Original release
August 27, 1995	BS The Legend of Zelda: Episode 4 (BSゼルダの伝説 第4話, BS Zelda no Densetsu: Dai 4 Wa)	Original release Prizes: Collecting 8 pieces of Triforce wins a player a "secret membership card" (秘密の会員証, himitsu no kaiinshō) for admission to the locked Nichibutsu Casino game available October 1, 1995. 50 top scoring players selected by lottery win an 8M Memory Pack

Rerun dates	Notes
September 3, 1995 - September 29, 1995	First rerun (6 days a week excluding Saturdays); Prize: High scores win 8M Memory Packs
October 1, 1995 - October 24, 1995	Second rerun (3 days a week: Sundays, Mondays, and Tuesdays only)
November 5, 1995 - November 28, 1995	Third rerun (3 days a week: Sundays, Mondays, and Tuesdays only)
January 1, 1997 - January 4, 1997	Player's Choice Classic SoundLink Game (あなたが選ぶ名作サウンドリンクゲーム, Anata ga Erabu Meisaku SoundLink Game) (once a day for four consecutive days); Prize: Collecting 8 pieces of Triforce wins a player a "secret membership card" and original stickers.

Dates	Chapter title	Notes
December 30, 1995 - December 31, 1995	BS The Legend of Zelda: Map 2 - Episode 1 (BSゼルダの伝説MAP2 第1話, BS Zelda no Densetsu MAP 2: Dai 1 Wa)	Original release
January 1, 1996 - January 2, 1996	BS The Legend of Zelda: Map 2 - Episode 2 (BSゼルダの伝説MAP2 第2話, BS Zelda no Densetsu MAP 2: Dai 2 Wa)	Original release
January 3, 1996 - January 4, 1996	BS The Legend of Zelda: Map 2 - Episode 3 (BSゼルダの伝説MAP2 第3話, BS Zelda no Densetsu MAP 2: Dai 3 Wa)	Original release
January 5, 1996 - January 6, 1996	BS The Legend of Zelda: Map 2 - Episode 4 (BSゼルダの伝説MAP2 第4話, BS Zelda no Densetsu MAP 2: Dai 4 Wa)	Original release

Rerun dates	Notes
March 3, 1996 - March 27, 1996	First rerun (5 days a week excluding Thursdays and Fridays only; NOTE: Episode 1 is only a 4-day week)

=== Reception and legacy ===
By all accounts, the popular reaction to BS Zelda no Densetsu was overwhelmingly positive. During the lead-up to its August 6 release, Nintendo described the games as being the "biggest buzz of the summer", and the release of the game generated such hype that St.GIGA was inundated with postcards and faxes from excited fans. Due to the game's "amazing popularity", discussion during the King of Summer (夏休みの王様, Natsuyasumi no Ō-sama) SoundLink Magazine broadcasts was dominated by the subject throughout the month of August. With the "whirlpool of excitement across the country" growing stronger rather than diminishing, it was decided that a September rerun would be made available for fans that had missed the initial run.

The September rerun did little to satisfy fans - instead yet more new players became interested during September's broadcasts. To satisfy continued interest in the game, it was decided that a second rerun would be broadcast during the month of October due to popular demand A third rerun was again broadcast during the month of November, and in late December 1996 fans voted by an overwhelming majority to broadcast a fourth rerun of BS Zelda as the "Player's Choice Classic SoundLink Game" for January 1997.

The development goal of creating a communal sense of simultaneous game-play was considered to have been met and magazines such as Digital Magazine Busters announced that the game had set records for the greatest number of people simultaneously playing a single game.

Due to the great successes of the game Nintendo undertook the development of a remixed version of BS Zelda no Densetsu that would be entitled BS Zelda no Densetsu: MAP2. Featuring all-new dungeon layouts and altered positions of items and locations in the overworld, BS Zelda: MAP2 represented the functional equivalent of the "Second Quest" portion of the original The Legend of Zelda. This sequel broadcast was in turn rerun once during March 1996.

The successes and popularity of SoundLink Games such as BS Zelda and Super Bombliss are directly responsible for further developments in the field of SoundLink Games including such titles as Itoi Shigesato no Bass Tsuri No. 1. The first two BS Zelda games would also serve as the direct forerunners of the later-broadcast BS Zelda no Densetsu: Inishie no Sekiban.

==== Emulation ====
Due to the short-lived nature of the game and the fact that the gameplay is intimately connected to the vocal SoundLink files that were broadcast into RAM and were thus incapable of digital preservation by receiving Satellaview-owners, the game cannot currently be played in its original form. Despite this, however, a small subculture of collectors and enthusiasts devoted to the restoration of these games have successfully managed to dump the digital information originally downloaded to and saved on the Satellaview's 8M memory packs. As temporally limited games, the copies of BS Zelda that had been saved on 8M Memory Packs were initially intended by Nintendo and St.GIGA to be over-written, by players, with later games. The fortuitous preservation of these 8M Memory Packs is responsible for all subsequent emulation efforts related to the games.

Since the last broadcasts of BS Zelda (in January 1997) and BS Zelda: MAP2 (in March 1996), restoration-minded fans have created numerous patches that have been applied to the original ROM dumps to alter the game by removing the game's download pauses and time limits, stringing together all four episodes into one, and providing a title screen and file selection screen, among others. Some patches have also replaced the game's protagonist with Link, the hero of the original The Legend of Zelda in order to more closely mimic this game. Due to the lack of the sound files, the "Listen closely" segments are sometimes altered to be replaced with a display showing the text of the narration that originally accompanied the event. Some MSU-1 emulation projects have introduced fan-made voice acting of the original script. Other restorations eschew the Satellaview options and favor an approach closer to making the game a 16-bit remake of the original Famicom The Legend of Zelda. The game has been translated by fans into English, French, Spanish, and German.

== BS Zelda no Densetsu: Inishie no Sekiban ==
BS Zelda no Densetsu Inishie no Sekiban
- Developer: Nintendo R&D2
- Publisher: St.GIGA
- Series: The Legend of Zelda
- Platform: Super Famicom with Satellaview add-on
- Release: JP: March 30, 1997
- Genre: Action-adventure
- Mode: Time-restricted single-player with multiplayer scoreboards

BS Zelda no Densetsu: Inishie no Sekiban (BSゼルダの伝説 古代の石盤; lit. BS The Legend of Zelda: Ancient Stone Tablets) is an action-adventure video game first broadcast to Satellaview owners, in March–April 1997 and rebroadcast as reruns at least 3 times. It is the third game in the BS Zelda series and as with the two previously broadcast BS Zelda spin-off games, BS Zelda no Densetsu and BS Zelda no Densetsu: MAP2, it also does not feature Link as the protagonist but instead utilizes the player's avatar from the inter-related Satellaview game, BS-X. For this reason it is also generally considered to be a spin-off title from the main Zelda series. Stylistically similar to The Legend of Zelda: A Link to the Past for the SNES, BS Zelda no Densetsu: Inishie no Sekiban is also occasionally regarded as an enhanced remake of this title. This conception most likely arises from the stylistic similarities of the games and the fact that the game is no longer playable in its original form and thus the differing plot of the game is more or less unknown to the general gaming public.

The game's title derives the "BS" portion of its name from the Broadcast Satellite system through which the game was transmitted by the distributor, St.GIGA, to Satellaview owners between the date of first broadcast in March 1997 and the last broadcast in May 1999. As a Satellaview SoundLink Game, broadcasts for BS Zelda: Inishie no Sekiban were composed of both a discretely quantifiable portion of game code and, as with the earlier BS Zelda games, a continually streaming vocal track employing the voices of voice actors. This would be the last SoundLink Game to be broadcast via Satellaview marking the end of a 4-year period of SoundLink broadcasts, and it was one of the last Satellaview games to be broadcast under Nintendo's direct control.

=== Plot ===
Set six years after the events in The Legend of Zelda: A Link to the Past, the story of Inishie no Sekiban begins when the character avatar from the distant Town Whose Name Has Been Stolen (それは名前を盗まれた街, Sore wa Namae o Nusumareta Machi) enters a mysterious-looking Fortune teller's house (占い師の館, Uranai-shi no Yakata) that has appeared in the town. Finding only a magical golden bee, the avatar follows after it and enters the back of the house where strong magic whisks the youth off to the Land of Hyrule where Princess Zelda's dreams have been troubled.

Discovering the youth collapsed on the ground, Zelda and her aged companion Aginah (アジナ) (a character from A Link to the Past - brother of the more memorable Sahasrala) revive the child and discuss the recent and troubling premonitions they have felt concerning Ganon's return. A few moments later a soldier arrives and announces that Ganon's evil forces have returned. Aginah and Zelda explain that Link has left the country and they ask the child to help obtain the eight "Ancient Stone Tablets". It is believed that if the hero/heroine can obtain these tablets, the message in them will reveal an ancient secret capable of defending Hyrule from Ganon and his army.

As the youth travels through Hyrule collecting items and stone tablets, support comes from afar by telepathic communications from Aginah (voiced by Kōji Yada (矢田 耕司)), the fortune teller (Yasuhiro Takato (高戸 靖広)), Princess Zelda (Mariko Kōda (國府田 マリ子)), the Hyrulian soldier (Moriya Endou (遠藤 守哉)), and even the narrator of the game (Hiroshi Isobe (磯辺 弘)). As the hero fights through the various dungeons, the land of Hyrule lends its powers to the child at certain pre-set points in the Zelda Time (ゼルダTIME) that controls the youth's access to the land. Aginah and the fortune teller explain these matters to the youth whom Zelda identifies as the "Hero of Light" (光の勇者) spoken of in legends.

Thus, the Hero of Light sets out to collect the Ancient Stone Tablets, traveling in the same Hyrule depicted in A Link to the Past. After collecting the Tablets and drawing the Master Sword from its pedestal in the Lost Woods, (Note: This plot point is the source of some fan disagreement with the canonicity of the game as the ending sequence from its predecessor, A Link to the Past, clearly states "And the Master Sword sleeps again... FOREVER!" (Nintendo EAD (21 Nov 1991). The Legend of Zelda: A Link to the Past (SNES). Nintendo.)) the Hero of Light, along with Zelda, climbs to the summit of Death Mountain to an ancient monument. Zelda translates the tablets using the Book of Mudora discovered in the basement of Link's House and the monument then cracks, revealing the Silver Arrow and Sacred Bow. This, Zelda says, is what the Hero of Light needs to defeat Ganon. Finally, a red portal opens up and reveals the way into the Dark World, where Ganon resides.

The Hero of Light enters Ganon's Tower and battles Ganon, defeating him with the Silver Arrow. After retreating back to Hyrule, Zelda reveals that although Link had sealed Ganon's body away forever in the Dark World by defeating him 6 years ago, Ganon's malicious essence had not been sealed. It was through this evil energy that the Hero of Light was pulled into Hyrule. The Hero then returns the Master Sword to its resting place in the Lost Woods, leaves Zelda and Aginah, and returns to The Town Whose Name Has Been Stolen in a flash of light.

=== Gameplay ===
The gameplay dynamics of BS Zelda: Inishie no Sekiban are most closely comparable to A Link to the Past. However, as with the previous BS Zelda titles, there are a number of major differences that make play-through for the two games substantially different. Notable among these were the renewed uses of streaming SoundLink vocal data and strict time limits and the game's episodic nature, as previously featured in the earlier BS Zelda games.

The use of SoundLink in Inishie no Sekiban demonstrated a degree of maturity over the previous BS Zelda games, insofar as they allowed a more natural and flowing playthrough without the pauses and delays that characterized vocal messages in BS Zelda. Rather than displaying a "Listen Closely" sign and pausing gameplay, the player could continue to move about during voice messages in Inishie no Sekiban. The plot that was developed through vocal files was also considerably more intricate, with important plot details revealed in dialogue only spoken during playthrough. The voice cast also grew in number from three people in BS Zelda to a cast of five, and fully voiced side-quest events and cut-scenes were also added at the beginning and end.

The game again renewed its use of the in-game 1-hour-long "Zelda Time" clock as previously employed in earlier BS Zelda games. At various pre-set points in Zelda Time special events would occur such as the appearance of fairies, the casting of magical attacks such as Bombos or Ether, and the granting of unlimited munitions to the Hero of Light for a limited duration. At other times, plot-related events would occur (such as Princess Zelda being attacked by monsters or the priest falling into the river), the weather would change (fog or rain), and enemies would spring forth in great profusion. Most time-linked events would be explained to the player via SoundLink so the player would not miss important events such as the side-quests.

As with the earlier BS Zelda titles, Inishie no Sekiban was divided into four weekly episodes broadcast in episodic installments. Once again episodes were named using the basic Satellaview suffixes described above, and broadcast only during a narrow 1-hour window. In addition, each episode once again limited players to a certain restricted playing area by withholding necessary items to ensure a paced gameplay experience and to enable a close tailoring of SoundLink plot details to the events unfolding in new areas of the overworld map. The overworld in Inishie no Sekiban is roughly identical to that in A Link to the Past except that it features cloud coverage to demarcate the areas that are explorable by the Hero of Light.

As in the previous BS Zelda titles, the player's name and gender are selected in the Satellaview game-selection interface, BS-X. This initial selection again carries across to the game, and the characters themselves are nameless in-game referred to by other characters as either the "Hero of Light" (Note: The term "Hero of Light" (光の勇者, hikari no yuusha) is a gender-neutral construction in Japanese.) or simply "child"/"youth". The appearance of the Satellaview avatar has been updated for Inishie no Sekiban from the smaller version used in the earlier BS Zelda games in a manner consistent with A Link to the Past's differences from the original The Legend of Zelda.

Several recurring features unique to Inishie no Sekiban were introduced to the game including the addition of thieves that sell the Hero of Light munition upgrades, rental shops that rent shovels and sword upgrades, gambling minigames to increase rupee/score count, and the mysterious Mole character that if spoken to will uncover a grotto filled with many hundreds of rupees. The Mole in particular represents a noteworthy characteristic of the game as the location of the Mole and the Mole's grotto changed for subsequent rerun broadcasts. Thus, whereas reruns of the earlier BS Zelda games were identical in content to prior broadcast runs, reruns of Inishie no Sekiban contained original non-header (Note: The portion of the ROM data known as the "header" was different for every new broadcast as the header portion contained the broadcast date.) content that could be used to identify the specific date of broadcast.

Other differences between Inishie no Sekiban and A Link to the Past (and the other BS Zelda titles) include the alteration of items from the past such as the Pegasus Boots which could now enable the player to change directions while running, (Note: This ability of the Pegasus Boots evokes the same ability granted to the Satellaview avatar when wearing the Dash Shoes (ダッシュシューズ) purchasable in-game in Sore wa Namae o Nusumareta Machi no Monogatari.) and to move between rooms and screens without automatically stopping as in A Link to the Past. The dungeon items were also modified so that instead of pendants and crystals the player now collected the eight titular Ancient Stone Tablets. Slight game-dynamics alterations were made for Inishie no Sekiban as well, including the removal of cracked bombable walls and their replacement with walls that could be tested for weaknesses by sounding them with the sword as first used in Link's Awakening.

As in the previous BS Zelda games, players received a score for successful completion of in-game objectives. Factors weighing into the score included the opening of treasure chests, completion of the side-quest event, talking to the Mole, and the collection of rupees, small keys, pieces of heart, dungeon items, heart containers, special items, and tablets. Negative factors included the passage of each minute of "Zelda Time" prior to the collection of the 2 weekly tablets, the loss of hearts, and game-overs. Though scoring had no effect on gameplay, there were other post-game benefits. At the end of each hour of play the player was given a score readout. By submitting these game high scores in the form of a password player scores would be recorded by Nintendo. If the player scored high enough in comparison to other players during that week, the score and the player's name would be reported and the player could sometimes win prizes such as memory packs.

=== Development ===
==== Broadcast dates ====
Dates	Chapter title	Notes
March 30, 1997 - April 5, 1997	BS The Legend of Zelda: Ancient Stone Tablets - Episode 1 (BSゼルダの伝説 古代の石盤 第1話, BS Zelda no Densetsu: Inishie no Sekiban ~Dai 1 Wa~)	Original release Prize: The 5 top-scoring players each week win 8M Memory Packs
April 6, 1997 - April 12, 1997	BS The Legend of Zelda: Ancient Stone Tablets - Episode 2 (BSゼルダの伝説 古代の石盤 第2話, BS Zelda no Densetsu: Inishie no Sekiban ~Dai 2 Wa~)	Original release Prize: The 5 top-scoring players each week win 8M Memory Packs
April 13, 1997 - April 19, 1997	BS The Legend of Zelda: Ancient Stone Tablets - Episode 3 (BSゼルダの伝説 古代の石盤 第3話, BS Zelda no Densetsu: Inishie no Sekiban ~Dai 3 Wa~)	Original release Prize: The 5 top-scoring players each week win 8M Memory Packs
April 20, 1997 - April 26, 1997	BS The Legend of Zelda: Ancient Stone Tablets - Episode 4 (BSゼルダの伝説 古代の石盤 第4話, BS Zelda no Densetsu: Inishie no Sekiban ~Dai 4 Wa~)	Original release Prize: The 5 top-scoring players each week win 8M Memory Packs

Rerun dates	Notes
June 1, 1997 - June 28, 1997	First rerun (7 days a week)
November 29, 1998 - December 26, 1998	Second rerun (7 days a week)
May 2, 1999 - May 30, 1999	Third rerun (7 days a week)

=== Reception and legacy ===
As with the prior BS Zelda games, Inishie no Sekiban was also well received, winning official recognition by Nintendo for gaining a spot among the Top 30 Player's choice votes for BS titles. The Korean Game Developer's Conference would later cite Inishie no Sekiban as one of the Satellaview titles primarily responsible for fostering a sense of collegial competition between Japanese players through St.GIGA's publishing of score ranking tables. The successes of the game among the gaming public prompted Nintendo and St.GIGA's rebroadcasting it again for three additional reruns. Reruns were broadcast in June 1997, in December 1998, and to mark the dissolution of the partnership between St.GIGA and Nintendo as the final SoundLink Game ever broadcast via Satellaview in May 1999.

==== Emulation ====
Because the game could only be played during certain predetermined hours due to constraints imposed by the use of SoundLink content, game data was saved to 8M Memory Packs as temporary files that were originally intended to be deleted and over-written with later game data. In addition, SoundLink data itself was streamed to players and thus only saved as volatile RAM which was overwritten during gameplay and ultimately lost as soon as the Satellaview was turned off. For these reasons and the fact that the game has never been re-released in hard-copy, Inishie no Sekiban cannot currently be played in its original form. Despite these setbacks, however, a small subculture of collectors and enthusiasts devoted to the restoration of Satellaview and Zelda games have managed to create ROM emulations from dumped materials stored on 8M Memory Packs that were not over-written by their owners. A 4-week version has been completed from dumped material and is currently playable as four separate ROMs, however several alternate versions of the game (as defined by weekly positioning of the Mole character) have not been yet been recovered and may be lost forever.

The emulated versions of the BS Zelda games that exist online fall into a legal grey area as they contain proprietary material (such as the use of Zelda and Ganon graphics designed by Nintendo) but do not have a substantial effect upon the work's value considering that Nintendo has ceased support for the games and has never released them in hard-copy. In addition, emulated versions that exist today commonly contain thorough attribution giving credit to Nintendo, St.GIGA, and all original production staff. Whatever the legal status of the games, Nintendo has turned a blind eye to the existence of Satellaview emulations.

== Zelda no Densetsu: Kamigami no Triforce ==
Between March 2, 1997 and May 29, 2000, St.GIGA frequently broadcast a ported version of the original Super Famicom The Legend of Zelda: A Link to the Past, called The Legend of Zelda: Triforce of the Gods (ゼルダの伝説 神々のトライフォース, Zelda no Densetsu: Kamigami no Triforce) in Japan. Unlike the BS Zelda broadcasts and Inishie no Sekiban, the Satellaview version of Kamigami no Triforce was not a SoundLink Game, did not feature the BS-X avatars as main characters (but rather used Link as in the original), and it was not divided into episodes. More importantly, it was not limited to play-through during a 1-hour block of "Zelda Time" but could instead be downloaded and played at the player's convenience. Whereas the BS Zelda games and Inishie no Sekiban were strictly limited to this 1-hour block and would be rendered unplayable after the time block had expired, the Satellaview version of Kamigami no Triforce (like a large number of other non-SoundLink titles for the Satellaview) instead utilized an internal play-through counter that would tick down from 5 to 0 for each time the game was played. On reaching 0, the game would be locked and would need to be re-downloaded in order to continue playing.

Apart from the play-through limit and the fact that the game took a purely digital form, the differences between the Satellaview version and the original Super Famicom version of Kamigami no Triforce were exceptionally minor. Such differences include the addition of "header" info to the Satellaview version and the use of slightly different code for the start menu. Although these differences are minor, emulated versions of the Satellaview version of Kamigami no Triforce have been dumped and can be found online.

Due to Nintendo's original partnership agreement with St.GIGA and because the Satellaview version of Kamigami no Triforce was not a SoundLink title, broadcasts of the game continued for several months after the dissolution of the partnership until St.GIGA finally ceased broadcasts in June 2000. Although the downloadable data was in fact material directly produced by Nintendo, this would mark the only time since Nintendo's deal with Philips in 1993 that Zelda video games would be distributed without the direct control of Nintendo.

=== Broadcast dates ===
Dates	Title	Notes
March 2, 1997 - March 29, 1997	The Legend of Zelda: Triforce of the Gods (ゼルダの伝説 神々のトライフォース, Zelda no Densetsu: Kamigami no Triforce)	Original run (broadcast twice daily for 30 minutes each)

Rerun dates	Notes
December 1, 1997 - December 27, 1997	First rerun period (7 days a week, once daily for 30 minutes)
March 1, 1998 - March 28, 1998	Second rerun period (7 days a week, once daily for 30 minutes)
November 15, 1998 - November 28, 1998	Third rerun period (7 days a week, once daily for 30 minutes)
April 25, 1999 - May 30, 1999	Fourth rerun period (7 days a week, 1-2 times daily for 60 minutes)
June 28, 1999 - July 4, 1999	Fifth rerun period (7 days a week, once daily for 60 minutes)
July 19, 1999 - August 29, 1999	Sixth rerun period (7 days a week, 1-2 times daily for 60 minutes)
November 29, 1999 - December 5, 1999	Seventh rerun period (7 days a week, 1-2 times daily for 60 minutes)
December 13, 1999 - February 27, 2000	Eighth rerun period (7 days a week, 1-2 times daily for 60 minutes)
May 1, 2000 - May 29, 2000	Ninth rerun period (7 days a week, 1-2 times daily for 60 minutes)
