= Hikaru Ijūin =

Japanese radio personality (born 1967)

- Born: Ken Tanaka; 7 November 1967 (age 58); Kita, Tokyo, Japan
- Years active: 1984 – Present
- Height: 1.83 m (6 ft 0 in)

Hikaru Ijūin (伊集院光, Ijūin Hikaru), real name Ken Shinooka (篠岡 建), formerly Ken Tanaka (田中 建), born 7 November 1967, is a Japanese comedian, radio personality, computer game reviewer, and commentator. He was born in Kita, Tokyo. He is married to former idol Mika Shinooka.

== Media appearances ==
=== Radio shows ===
- 1988-1990: Ijuin Hikaru no All Night Nippon (Nippon Housou, Wed (2 parts), Fri (2 parts))
- 1989-1990: CREATIVE COMPANY Tomita Waon Kabushikigaisha – Ijuin Hikaru Honbu (CBC Radio)
- 1991-1995: Ijuin Hikaru no Oh! Deka-night (Nippon Housou)
- 1995-1996: Hikaru Ijuin's King of After School (King of Summer) (伊集院光の放課後の王様, Ijuin Hikaru no Houkago no Ousama (Natsu-yasumi no Ousama)) (St.GIGA, Satellaview)
- 1995–Present: Ijuin Hikaru Shinya no Baka-chikara

(1995〜2000:UP'S, 2002〜:Monday JUNK) (TBS Radio)

- 1996-1997: Hikaru Ijuin's Mysterious Radio Dispatch Base (伊集院光の怪電波発信基地, Ijuin Hikaru no Kaidenpa Hasshin Kichi)) (St.GIGA, Satellaview)
- 1998-2000: Ijuin Hikaru Nichiyou Daishougun (TBS Radio)
- 2000-2008: Ijuin Hikaru Nichiyoubi no Himitsu Kichi (TBS Radio)

=== TV shows ===
==== Variety ====
- 24 Feb 1989: Joudan Gahou II (Fuji TV)
- 1990: Ucchan Nanchan no Yaru Nara Yaraneba! (as Nanmakun's warrior victim)(Fuji TV)
- 1990: Gigu Gyagu Gerira (Nippon TV)
- 1992-1993: Hyu Hyu (Nippon TV)
- 1992-1993: Suteki na Kibun De! (TBS)
- 1993: Kinyou Mogura Negura (Denki Groove no Panda no Nagare Sagyou) (TV Tokyo)
- 1993-1996: Urutora7:00 (Nippon TV)
- 1993: Challenge Dai-Ma-Ou (TBS)
- 6 April 1994: Jungle TV ~ Tamori no Housoku~ (Mainichi Housou/TBS Series)
- 1994-1995: Tensai Tenbi-kun (NHK Kyouiku)
- 1995-1997: Game Catalogue 2 (TV Asahi)
- 1996-1997: Barikin 7 Kensha no Sakusen (TBS)
- 1996-1997: Otona no Asobi-jikan (NHK Sougou)
- 1997-1999: Weekend Show (NHKBS2)
- 1998-2002: Gamewave (TV Tokyo)
- 1999-2001: Rekishi Tanken (NHK Kyouiku)
- 2000-2002: Denga na! (later changed to 'CGTV') (TBS)
- 2000: Tekkou-ki Mikaduki Joyoru (as a TV reporter) (Fuji TV)
- 2000-2001: CX NUDE DV (as the presenter, same as in "The Kaigi-shitsu") (Fuji TV)
- 2002-2003: GameBREAK (TV Asahi)
- 2002-2004: Zenigata Kintarou (supporter) (TV Asahi)
- 2004-2005: Gekkan Ijuin (MONDO21)
- 2003-2007: Tora no Mon (only the broadcasts of 'Unchiku Ou Kettei-sen', 'Net Kensaku Yama-kuzushi' and 'All Night Tora no Mon') (TV Asahi)
- 2005-2009: Bakushou Mondai no Kensaku-chan (semi-regular panellist) (TV Asahi)
- 2007: Quiz Presen Variety Q Sama!! (always appears in the 'Pressure Study' intelligent celebrity competition) (TV Asahi)
- 2007: Ima Sugu Tsukaeru Mame-chishiki Quiz Zatsugaku Ou (semi-regular panellist) (TV Asahi)
- 2007: Hitoshi Matsumoto no Suberanai Hanashi The Golden SP2 (Fuji TV)
- 2007-2009: Ijuin Hikaru no Bangumi (BS11 Digital)
- 2007: Kaiketsu! Fushigi Sousa-tai (Presenter) (Aomori TV)
- 2008-2009: Kashikotsu!! (TV Asahi)
- 2009: Ijuin Hikaru no Shin-bangumi (BS11 Digital)

==== Journalism, topical shows and sports ====
- 1993: Nekketsu Dragons Sengen (Chukyo TV)
- Around 1996: TV Jan!! (Sports Corner Regular) (Nippon Terebi)
- 2003: Hikaru! Sports Kenkyusho (changed to 'Supoken' from April 2008) (Nagoya Broadcasting Network)
- 2003-2005: Ijuin Hikaru no Yakkyu no Mikata! (changed to 'Ijuin Hikaru no Yakkyu Ban' in 2004) (Perfect Choice)
- 2004-2007: Sports Tamashii (main caster) (TV Tokyo)
- 2007-2008: Super Morning (Wednesday's main commentator) (TV Asahi)
- 2007: NNN News Realtime (panellist on 'Koko ga Wakaran!’) (Nippon TV)

==== Drama ====
- 1992: Matta Na! (role of the fighter Takimoto) (Nippon TV)
- 14 Feb 1996: Furuhata Ninzaburō (the role of clothing official Iwata) (Fuji TV)
- 4 Feb 1997: Bayside Shakedown (the role of stalker Noguchi) 5th episode (Fuji TV)
- 19 Sep 1997: Shokuinshitsu, final episode (voice role) (TBS TV)
- 17 Apr 1998: Kinyou Entertainment Jo-ou Hachi (the role of Saburou Yusa)
- 30 Dec 1999: Yonige-ya Honpo (Nippon TV)
- 28 August 2002: Shomuni Final (the role of businessman Masaya Sakaki)

=== Film and television ===
- 1994: Kudokiya Show (role of Jin Dokuyaku (毒薬仁)) (Toei Video)
- 1994: Shin Funky Monkey Teechee Do-Tsukaretaru nen! (Pony Canyon)
- 1995: Fatman Brothers ~Hyakkan Tantei~ (Director and Appearance, formed a rap group 'FATMAN BROTHERS' with Hidehiko Ishizuka (石塚英彦) and Taguchi Hiromasa (田口浩正), also in charge of the theme song) (Bandai Visual)
- 1996: Sūpā no Onna (Supermarket Woman, Toho)
- 1997: Marutai no Onna (Woman of the Police Protection Program, Toho)
- 1997: Himitsu no Kaden (Toho)
- 1997: Flanders no Inu (the role of a judge's voice, Shochiku)
- 1999: Gamera 3: Revenge of Iris (the role of a policeman around Kyoto station, Toho)
- 2001: Go! (Nikkatsu)
- 2003: Gozamareji (Creative Akuza)
- 2007: Gegege no Kintarou (the voice of Nurikabe) (Shochiku)
- 2008: Gegege no Kintarou Sennen Noroi Uta (the voice of Nurikabe, Shochiku)
- 2018: It Comes (Toho)
- 2021: Struggling Man (Nikkatsu, Tokyo Theatres)

=== DVDs ===
- 2008: Tokuten Eizou (directed by Cream Stew's Teppei Arita (有田哲平)) (Victor Entertainment)
- 2008: Ijuin Hikaru no Bangumi no DeeVeeDee Vol.1 (Pony Canyon)
- 2008: Ijuin Hikaru no Bangumi no DeeVeeDee Vol.1 (Pony Canyon)

=== Bibliography ===
- Ijuin Hikaru no Oh! Deka-oo Hyakka (Nippon Housou Publishing, ISBN 4-594-01120-9)
- Shiawase no Tsubo (Shueisha, ISBN 4-08-781085-2)
- Silver Senryuu Kitamakura (Nippon TV, ISBN 4-8203-9520-3)
- Ijuin Hikaru to Bengoshi Ishida Takeshi no Momegoto Kaiketsu Daishougun (Shougakukan, ISBN 4-09-404581-3)
- The Kaigishitsu (co-written with Miurajun and Gorou Yamada (山田五郎), Mitsunobusha, ISBN 4-87761-056-1)
- Kyuman-Yakkyu Manga Shaberita-oshi! (Jitsugyo no Nihon Sha, ISBN 4-408-61233-2)
- D.T. (co-written with Miurajun, Media Factory, ISBN 4-8401-0619-3)
- No Hanashi (Takarajimasha, ISBN 4-7966-6094-1)
- No Hanashi ni (Takarajima, ISBN 978-4-7966-6190-4)

=== CD ===
- 'Hoshizora no Passport', Yui Haga, Sony Music Cause Kabushikigaisha, 1990
- 'ARAKAWA Tamashii', Arakawa Rap Brothers, Sony Music Cause Kabushikigaisha
- 'Zenraman no Theme', Saburou Maruhadaka and Zenraman Brothers Band, Sony Music Cause Kabushikigaisha, 1993
- 'FATMAN BROTHERS', FATMAN BROTHERS (Hikaru Ijuin, Hidehiko Ishizuka(石塚英彦), Hiromasa Taguchi(田口浩正)), Pioneer LDC, 1995
- Ijuin Hikaru Senkyoku Oba Kayou (label: EMI Music Japan ASIN: B000228X0A) Omnibus 2004
- 'Nippon Mukashi-banashi~Fairy Stories~10th Edition', Hikaru Ijuin, Youko Kon( 今陽子), Shingo Tsurumi (鶴見辰吾), Mami Yamase (山瀬まみ), Columbia Music Entertainment, 2005; Horipro talent agency's 45th anniversary recitation album series (Horipro star talent reading Japan's old tales)

=== Serials ===
- Ijuin Hikaru Sekkin ni Tsuki Game Keihou Hatsureichuu 'Shuupan Famitsu' (Enterbrain) – Column Series
- Yuukan TU-KA (TU-KA Original Contents) 3 times weekly, but the publication ended on 29 Sep 2006. The later published 'No Hanashi' and 'No Hanashi ni' included improved and revised versions of the contents.
