= The Legend of Zelda: A Link to the Past =

1991 video game

- North American box art
- Developer: Nintendo EAD
- Publisher: Nintendo
- Director: Takashi Tezuka
- Producer: Shigeru Miyamoto
- Programmers: Yasunari Soejima; Toshihiko Nakago
- Artists: Masanao Arimoto; Tsuyoshi Watanabe
- Writer: Kensuke Tanabe
- Composer: Koji Kondo
- Series: The Legend of Zelda
- Platform: Super Nintendo Entertainment System
- Release: JP: November 21, 1991; NA: April 13, 1992; EU: September 24, 1992
- Genre: Action-adventure
- Mode: Single-player

The Legend of Zelda: A Link to the Past (Note: Japanese: ゼルダの伝説 神々のトライフォース, Hepburn: Zeruda no Densetsu Kamigami no Toraifōsu; lit. The Legend of Zelda: Triforce of the Gods) is a 1991 action-adventure game developed and published by Nintendo for the Super Nintendo Entertainment System (SNES). It is the third game in The Legend of Zelda series, following Zelda II: The Adventure of Link (1987). It was released in Japan in 1991, and in North America and Europe in 1992.

The story is set many years before the events of the first two Zelda games. The player assumes the role of Link as he journeys to save Hyrule, defeat the Demon King Ganon, and rescue the descendants of the Seven Sages. It returns to a top-down perspective similar to the original The Legend of Zelda, dropping the side-scrolling gameplay of The Adventure of Link. It also introduced series staples such as parallel worlds and items including the Master Sword.

A Link to the Past is considered among the greatest video games ever made, with particular praise for its presentation and innovative gameplay. It was ported to the Game Boy Advance as A Link to the Past and Four Swords in 2002, and had sold 6.5 million copies across both platforms by 2004. It was subsequently re-released on the Wii, Wii U, and New Nintendo 3DS via the Virtual Console, the Nintendo Switch via the Nintendo Classics service, and the Super NES Classic Edition. A sequel, A Link Between Worlds, was released for the Nintendo 3DS in 2013.

== Gameplay ==
Link can travel between two worlds, which have similar layouts but different aesthetics. Shown is the same location in the Light World (top) and the Dark World (bottom), a dilapidated parallel Hyrule.

A Link to the Past puts the player in control of its protagonist, Link, and is viewed and controlled from an overhead perspective, much like the original The Legend of Zelda. This contrasts its predecessor, Zelda II: The Adventure of Link, which had a side-scrolling perspective. Where Link could only move in four directions in the original The Legend of Zelda, Link can now move diagonally as well. The player explores the overworld of Hyrule while entering dungeons in order to defeat bosses and receive items necessary for completing Link's quest. These dungeons are often multi-level, requiring Link to ascend and descend stairs or fall into holes to progress. Link is able to use a variety of weapons and items, with his two main items being his sword and shield, both of which are acquired early and can be upgraded multiple times. Certain items, such as the Lantern, use magic points when used. Link acquires items at various points in his journey, sometimes in the overworld. Each dungeon has a large chest, which grants a piece of equipment that is typically necessary to complete the game. As the player explores the overworld, they can find optional health upgrades called Heart Pieces; when four are collected, they form a Heart Container, which increases Link's health by one.

A Link to the Past features two separate but similar overworlds: the Light World and the Dark World. Link starts in the Light World. By traveling through portals, he can enter the Dark World, a parallel version of the Light World. The Dark World has different enemies, non-playable characters, and dungeons; the player will often have to travel back and forth between the two worlds to progress. The Dark World's locations and geography often line up with the Light World's, such as Kakariko Village and the Village of Outcasts. While Link can enter the Dark World via portals, he can only exit the Dark World using an item called the Magic Mirror. This leaves a special portal behind that allows him to return through it, though it is erased if Link uses the Magic Mirror in the Dark World. At times, this allows Link to reach areas otherwise inaccessible.

== Plot ==
=== Setting ===
A Link to the Past is a distant prequel to the original The Legend of Zelda and Zelda II: The Adventure of Link. Within the official chronology, it is the first game in the "Defeated Hero" timeline that connects to an alternate reality scenario where the Hero of Time is defeated by Ganondorf in Ocarina of Time. This results in Ganondorf being imprisoned in the Sacred Realm in his Ganon form out of desperation. Having successfully gathered all three pieces of the Triforce, Ganon's evil desires have transformed the realm into the Dark World. The game is set in Hyrule, also known as the Light World, which parallels the Dark World. Before the events of the game, the descendants of the Seven Sages who imprisoned Ganon are captured, Princess Zelda included, and, one by one, sent to the Dark World. The King of Hyrule is murdered, and the wizard, Agahnim, takes over.

=== Story ===
The game begins with series protagonist Link, the last descendant of the Knights of Hyrule, and his uncle being awakened by a telepathic message from Zelda, who says that she has been locked in Hyrule Castle's dungeon by Agahnim and requires rescue. Link's uncle goes to rescue her first, and Link follows, despite his uncle's orders to remain home. His uncle is mortally wounded and, before succumbing, Link receives a sword and shield from him. He infiltrates Hyrule Castle and successfully hides Zelda in the Sanctuary as his uncle's last wish. Zelda remains in the Sanctuary with the priest, who tells Link that Agahnim is a powerful wizard planning to free Ganon from the Dark World, after he was imprisoned for attempting to use the Triforce for evil purposes. Agahnim's weak point is the Master Sword, a relic weapon only the chosen hero can wield; to do so, the hero must obtain three pendants.

Link journeys to find the three pendants, aided by Sahasrahla along the way, and eventually obtaining the Master Sword. Zelda communicates her peril to Link telepathically and, upon returning to the Sanctuary, finds the priest dying, who tells him to rescue Zelda. He attempts to rescue Zelda, but to no avail, as Agahnim sends her to the Dark World. After defeating Agahnim, the wizard sends Link to the Dark World, where he must rescue the maiden descendants of the Seven Sages. He once again battles Agahnim and, upon defeat, Ganon appears from Agahnim's corpse and flies to the Pyramid of Power. Upon defeating Ganon, Link retrieves the Triforce and is given the chance to make a wish. In the ending, his uncle, the priest, and the King of Hyrule are all resurrected, everyone trapped in the Dark World comes home, and Link later puts the Master Sword back into its pedestal.

== Development ==
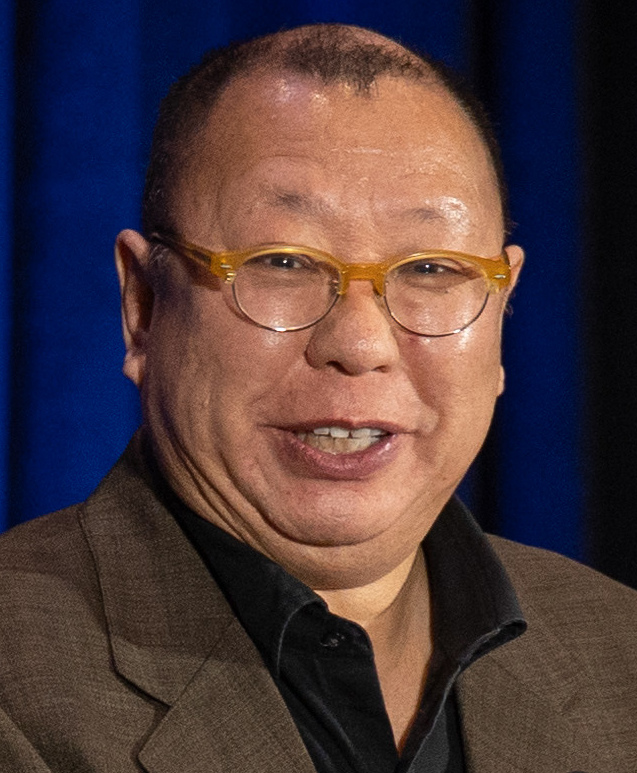
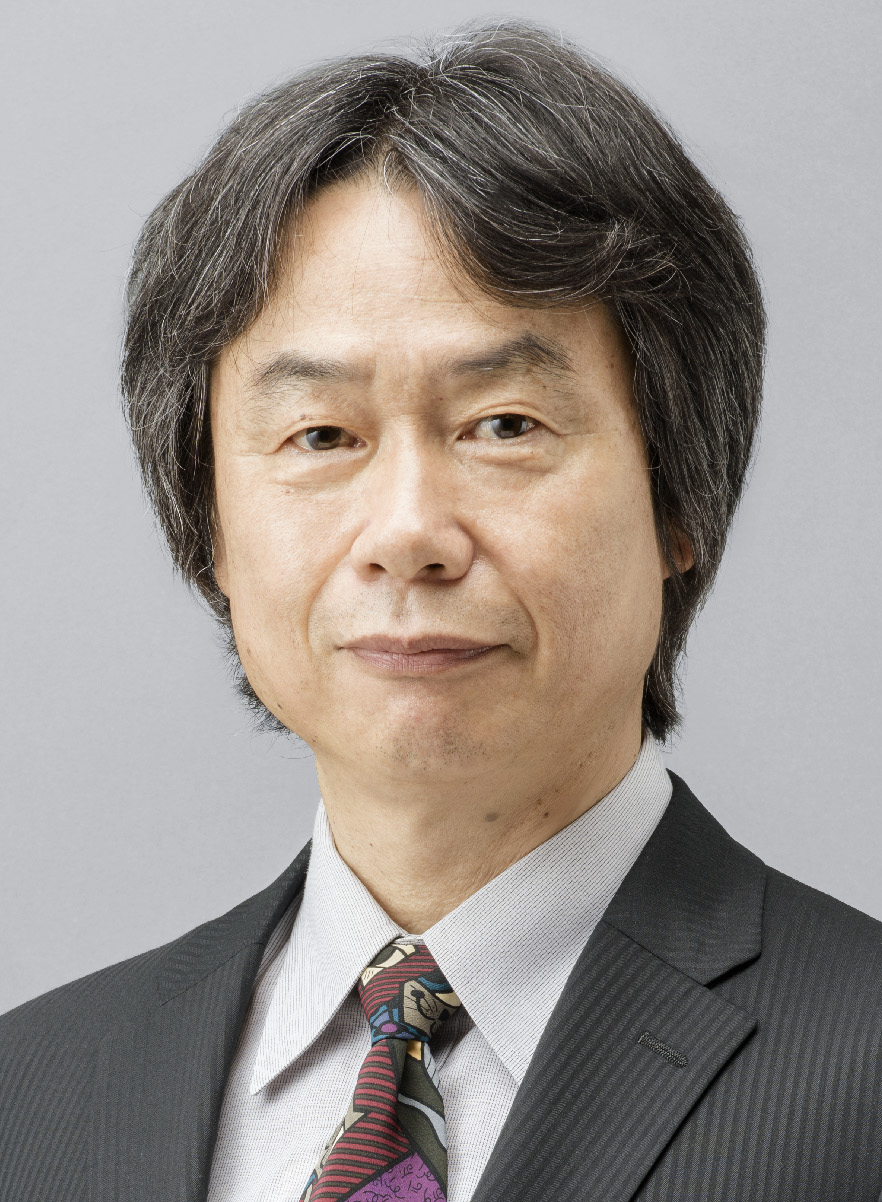
A Link to the Past's director Takashi Tezuka in 2024 (left) and its producer Shigeru Miyamoto in 2015 (right)

In 1988, development of a new NES The Legend of Zelda video game began, but one year later, the project was brought to Nintendo's next console; the Super Famicom (known as the Super NES in other regions). Due to the success of previous Zelda games, Nintendo was able to invest a large budget and ample development time and resources into the game's production. At the time, most Super NES game cartridges had 4 Mbit (512 KB) of storage space. This game broke the trend by using 8 Mbit (1 MB), allowing the Nintendo development team to create a remarkably expansive world for Link to inhabit. Like Super Mario World, this game used a simple graphic compression method on the Super NES by limiting the color depth of many tiles to eight colors instead of the Super NES's native 16-color tiles. The tiles were decompressed at runtime by adding a leading bit to each pixel's color index. Storage space was also saved by eliminating duplication: The Light World and the Dark World are almost identical in layout (though using differing texture tiles), and the Dark World exists in the ROM only as an "overlay" of the Light World. Producer Shigeru Miyamoto originally intended the game to feature a party, "one that consists of the protagonist, ... a magic user, and a girl". The script was written by series newcomer Kensuke Tanabe, while Yoshiaki Koizumi was responsible for the background story explained in the instruction manual. Due to time constraints, certain features were cut from the final release, such as the ability to cause wildfires in grassy areas (which would later be incorporated into Four Swords Adventures). The player was able to freely choose which weapons to hold and would be able to swap and combine items such as using both bombs and arrows at the same time. According to Tezuka, this did not come to pass as Miyamoto requested that Link always have the sword equipped.

To promote the game, a commercial was shot in which Link, Zelda, Gibdos, and Stalfos dance in a dungeon to a Zelda-themed version of "Game Boyz" (ゲームボーイズ) by Scha Dara Parr, from the group's second album Towering Nonsense (タワリングナンセンス).

=== Music ===
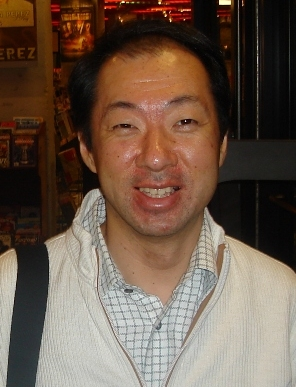
Koji Kondo in 2006

The score was composed, arranged, and produced by Koji Kondo. The overworld theme of The Legend of Zelda ("Hyrule Overture") returns in A Link to the Past, redone in S-SMP style. The theme is also featured in "Light World Overworld" and in "End Credits". A Link to the Past helped to establish the musical core of the Zelda series. While the first game originated the "Hyrule Overture", many recurring motifs of the Zelda scores come from A Link to the Past, including "Zelda's Lullaby" (Princess Zelda's Theme), "Ganondorf's Theme", "Hyrule Castle" (Royal Family Theme), "Kakariko Village" and "Select Screen/Fairy Cave". These themes have been used in subsequent The Legend of Zelda games. A soundtrack to Kamigami no Triforce, entitled The Legend of Zelda: Sound and Drama, was released by Sony Records in Japan on June 22, 1994. The first disc is 44 minutes long and features rearranged versions of a selection of the game's themes, along with a bonus drama track. The second disc features 54 minutes of the original arrangements for the game and those of the original NES game.

=== Localization ===
The English-language localization included changes to the original Japanese game. The most common change was the removal of religious references to conform with Nintendo of America's content guidelines. The most obvious change was made to the subtitle, which was renamed from Kamigami no Triforce ("Triforce of the Gods") to A Link to the Past. The font used to represent an unreadable language, Hylian, was based on Egyptian hieroglyphs, which carry religious meanings, and it was altered in the English version. The priest Agahnim became a wizard.

=== Easter egg ===
In 1990, Nintendo Power held a contest, requiring players to take a photo of the "WarMECH", a powerful and rare enemy in Final Fantasy. As a prize, one of the successful entrants was to be selected at random to appear in an upcoming game, though it was not revealed which game it would be. As a result, a hidden room exists in A Link to the Past containing 45 blue rupees and a greeting from Chris Houlihan, the winner of the contest, reading "My name is Chris Houlihan. This is my top secret room. Keep it between us, okay?"

The room was intended as a crash prevention measure; the game would send players to this room if it could not determine where Link was going when he goes to another area, and has been found through five different methods. There was no wide awareness of the room until the 2000s, more than a decade after the release of A Link to the Past with the increased popularity of the Internet and Super NES emulators.

The Game Boy Advance re-release, The Legend of Zelda: A Link to the Past and Four Swords, removed the ability to access the room; however, it could still be found in the game's code. The Virtual Console and Nintendo Classics versions contain the room, being emulations of the original game.

== Reception ==
Reception

Aggregate scores
Aggregator	Score	
Aggregator	GBA	SNES
GameRankings	92%	93%
Metacritic	95/100	

Review scores
Publication	Score	
Publication	GBA	SNES
AllGame	4.5/5	5/5
Dragon		5/5
Electronic Gaming Monthly		8/10, 9/10, 9/10, 9/10
Famitsu		9/10, 10/10, 10/10, 10/10
GamePro	5/5	5/5
GameSpot	9.2/10	
IGN	9.7/10	
Mean Machines		95%
Hippon Super!		9/10, 10/10, 10/10
SNES Force		93%

Awards
Publication	Award
Chicago Tribune	Best Game of the Year (1992)
Electronic Gaming Monthly	Best Video Game Sequel (1992)
Nintendo Power	SNES Game of the Year (runner-up), Graphics and Sound (SNES), Challenge (SNES), Best Hero (Link)
Entertainment Weekly, Next Generation, Popular Mechanics	Best Game of All Time
G4, Gamereactor, IGN	Best Game of All Time (runner-up)
GamePro, Kotaku	Best Game of the Generation

A Link to the Past was critically acclaimed upon release for its graphics and gameplay, and has since been recognized by critics as one of the greatest games of all time. Famitsu's four reviewers Tofuya Famibou, Muzno, Mariko Morishita and Giorgio Nakaji gave the game high scores. The reviewers praised the game's story and graphics with Morishita noting that even the smallest gestures of characters were very detailed. Nakaji noted the game may be difficult for players new to the Zelda games, but declared it a game that will remind players "how much fun games can be."

It was the first game to receive a near-perfect score by Famitsu magazine. It was awarded Best Sequel of 1992 by Electronic Gaming Monthly. Chicago Tribune selected it as Best Game of the Year, tied with Street Fighter II. A Link to the Past was reviewed in Dragon magazine by Sandy Petersen in 1993, giving it 5 out of 5 stars.

In 1995, Total! listed the game 2nd on its "Top 100 SNES Games". In 1996, GamesMaster rated the game 80th on their "Top 100 Games of All Time". In 2005, IGN editors placed it 11th in its "Top 100 Games", while readers voted it to 5th place, before IGN later ranked it the second best game of all time in 2015 and 2019. In 2006, Entertainment Weekly chose it as the best game of all-time and it was inducted into GameSpot's list of the greatest games of all time. It has also been listed as the best game of all time by Next Generation and Popular Mechanics magazines, and as the second best game of all time by G4 and Gamereactor. Members of GameFAQs ranked it the 4th best, and readers of Japanese magazine Famitsu ranked it 31st in a 2006 poll. It also placed 3rd in Electronic Gaming Monthly's list, 23rd in Game Informer's, and 3rd in a best 200 Nintendo games list by Nintendo Power. In July 2007, readers of the magazine Edge voted it sixth in a poll of the 100 best games of all time. ScrewAttack placed it 2nd on their list of top 20 Super Nintendo games. GamesRadar named A Link to the Past the third best Super NES game of all time, losing only to Chrono Trigger (2nd) and Super Metroid (1st). It placed eighth (the second-highest Zelda game on the list) in Official Nintendo Magazine's "100 greatest Nintendo games of all time" list. In 2009, Game Informer put A Link to the Past 12th on their list of "The Top 200 Games of All Time", saying that it "remains a blast today". This is 11 places ahead of the rank it had back in 2001. In 2018, Complex listed the game 2nd on its "The Best Super Nintendo Games of All Time". They felt the game is "definitely Nintendo's best first-party title for the SNES".

A Link to the Past and Four Swords for the Game Boy Advance received similar critical acclaim. IGN praised it for being a faithful conversion of the original, but noted that the audio did not sound as crisp on the Game Boy Advance, and found the frequent sound effects tiresome. The game holds the top spot of Metacritic's all-time high scores for Game Boy Advance games with a score of 95. In 2007, IGN named A Link to the Past and Four Swords the third best Game Boy Advance game of all time. GamePro's Star Dingo called it a "masterpiece", as well as an "important part of the Grand Renaissance of the Second Dimension". He also praised the overworld for its secrets and "quirky random characters", adding that playing it required patience and exploring. Star Dingo praised the port of A Link to the Past's ability to retain its visuals. He specifically praises its "clean sprites", calling its overworld a "colorful, happy place", sarcastically calling it kiddy. He also questioned how the series' cartoon style was abnormal for the series. Star Dingo called the sound effects "indelible", though he noted that they were "a little dated". UGO Networks compared Four Swords to Oracle of Ages and Oracle of Seasons, calling it "similarly gimmicky". They commented that the best Four Swords brought was its sequel, The Minish Cap. CNET praised both the original A Link to the Past release as well as the Four Swords multiplayer mode, calling the former a "great handheld port of one of the greatest games ever released for Nintendo's 16-bit system", while describing the latter as "an exciting, replayable multiplayer experience". Nintendo Power had a positive review for the GBA version, praising the level design and puzzles.

=== Sales ===
A Link to the Past was set for release in March 1991. Additional staff were hired to complete the game by adding further elements to the game such as more enemies and scenarios. According to Miyamoto, these elements took an additional eight months to develop. It was released in Japan on November 21, 1991. Releases in North America and Europe followed on April 13, 1992 and September 24, 1992 respectively. The game was a commercial success upon release. In Japan, it topped the Famitsu sales charts during November–December 1991 and January 1992, becoming the best-selling 1991 release. In the United States, it became the third best-selling game of 1992 (below Sonic the Hedgehog 2 and Street Fighter II) with one million units sold. It had an exceptionally long stay on Nintendo Power's top games list (ranking number 2 in Nintendo Power's last issue in December 2012): when the Super NES list was retired, A Link to the Past had more than five consecutive years in the number one spot. It was later re-released as a Player's Choice title in North America, indicating that it had sold a minimum of one million copies there. Worldwide, it was one of the best-selling Super NES games, with 4.61 million units sold as of 2004.

The later Game Boy Advance version in the United States alone sold 1.4 million copies and earned $41 million by August 2006. During the period between January 2000 and August 2006, it was the 8th highest-selling game launched for the Game Boy Advance, Nintendo DS, or PlayStation Portable in that country. The Game Boy Advance version sold 1.89 million units worldwide by 2004, bringing total sales to 6.5 million units as of 2004.

== Legacy ==
=== Chris Houlihan Room ===
The Escapist, G4TV, GameSpy, Good Game, IGN, Nintendo Life, and PALGN referenced the Chris Houlihan room in articles which discuss video game easter eggs and secrets.

GamesRadar included it in its lists of the greatest video game Easter eggs and the thirteen "video game secrets that were almost never found". GamesRadar's Jason Fanelli called it "one of the Zelda franchise's biggest mysteries". GamesRadar's Justin Towell included it in his list of the top seven secret rooms in video games at number two. He felt that the contest prize was exciting, and called it "one of the coolest and most exclusive secrets in the Zelda universe". 1UP.com featured it in its list of "25 things you didn't know about The Legend of Zelda".

=== Comics ===
A comic book adaptation of A Link to the Past illustrated by Shotaro Ishinomori was published in Nintendo Power that was serialized for 12 issues from January to December 1992. The comic was then re-released as a trade paperback in 1993. The comic is a loose adaptation of the original game's story, featuring several plot changes and new characters. Two other manga were released in Japan: a manga by Ataru Cagiva from 1995 to 1996 that was serialized in Enix Corporation's Monthly GFantasy and later collected into three volumes and a one-volume manga by the duo Akira Himekawa released in 2005 corresponding with the release of Game Boy Advance version. Both follow the game's plot more closely, and the latter introduced a new character called "Ghanti", a thief with a single devil's horn and a star under her eye.

=== Related games ===
A French version of this game was released in Canada, making it the only French-only release in North America for the Super NES. This version had the same case as the English release in North America, but the whole game was translated into French. The next Zelda game, Link's Awakening was released in 1993 for the Nintendo Game Boy. It retained many of A Link to the Past's gameplay mechanics, including the top-down perspective, as well as an overworld which resembled that of A Link to the Past. After traveling to train abroad, Link is shipwrecked and awakens on an island called Koholint. Beginning on March 2, 1997, a simple unaltered re-release of the original Japanese version of A Link to the Past was broadcast via Satellaview. The game was rebroadcast more often than any other Zelda game on the Satellaview, and was the only Zelda title broadcast by St.GIGA after ties with Nintendo were broken in April 1999. Unlike other two Satellaview Zelda games, Kamigami no Triforce lacked SoundLink support.

Apart from official sequels and re-releases made or licensed by Nintendo, A Link to the Past has proven to be very popular within the game-modding community, inspiring the development of numerous fangames, such as the unofficial 2007 sequel The Legend of Zelda: Parallel Worlds. In 2023, A Link to the Past was reverse-engineered, making unofficial ports possible on a broad range of platforms.

==== Inishie no Sekiban ====
In 1997, a follow-up, BS Zelda no Densetsu: Inishie no Sekiban (lit. "BS The Legend of Zelda: Ancient Stone Tablets" or "Stone Tablets of Antiquity"), was released in Japan. Designed exclusively for the Super Famicom's Satellaview peripheral, BS Zelda made use of a voice broadcast system, SoundLink, to provide voice-acting for several characters. The game takes place six years after the events in A Link to the Past and is set in Hyrule's Light World. It lacks a Link character, and instead the player character is known as the Hero of Light. The available player-characters are actually the male and female BS-X avatars that also featured in BS Zelda no Densetsu. The game was divided into four weekly episodes. These episodes were played live, and a voice-acted soundtrack simultaneously ran on the satellite network, sometimes containing suggestions, clues, and plot development for the game currently being broadcast. Each week, the player could only access certain portions of the overworld. Areas shrouded in clouds were unreachable. Two dungeons were accessible per week, but the episode ended only when time expired and not when the player had completed all the objectives for that week. The game could only be played during the set hours because the SoundLink content was central to gameplay (and not stored on the base unit or flash-RAM cartridge in any way), and the timer was based on a real-time clock set by the satellite itself.

==== A Link to the Past and Four Swords ====
A Link to the Past was re-released for the Game Boy Advance in 2002 in North America and 2003 in other territories as part of The Legend of Zelda: A Link to the Past and Four Swords, a collaborative development effort between Nintendo and Capcom. The port of A Link to the Past contains minor changes from the original, including the addition of voice clips and other sound effects taken from Ocarina of Time and Majora's Mask. Four Swords is a multiplayer adventure that interacts with the single-player adventure. Accomplishments can be transferred between the two; for example, if the player learns a new sword technique, it is made available in both modes. By completing Four Swords, a new dungeon called the Palace of the Four Sword is unlocked in A Link to the Past. In Four Swords, dungeons are randomly generated and are affected by the number of players. If only two players are active, the game ensures that all puzzles generated do not require a third or fourth player to solve. The plot of Four Swords revolves around the wind mage Vaati, who escapes from the Four Sword he is sealed in and captures Princess Zelda to marry her. Link uses the Four Sword to create three copies of himself and rescues Zelda, trapping Vaati in the sword once again. At the time of its release, the story of Four Swords was considered the earliest point in the series' timeline.

==== A Link Between Worlds ====
In 2011, Shigeru Miyamoto expressed desire to have A Link to the Past remade for the Nintendo 3DS, stating how attractive the two layers would look. Planning for this successor actually began after the completion of Spirit Tracks in 2009, though full development did not begin until 2012. In April 2013, Nintendo revealed in its Nintendo Direct presentation a new game based on the same world as A Link to the Past for Nintendo 3DS, featuring new 3D visuals, completely new dungeons, new gameplay mechanics, and an original story. On November 22, Nintendo released A Link Between Worlds, which takes place in the same world, but features a new storyline, new puzzles and original dungeons. Height and depth play a large role by taking advantage of the 3D feature of the 3DS, while maintaining the traditional top-down perspective.

=== In other media ===
A Link to the Past has been prominently represented in other Zelda-related media since its original release, chiefly the Super Smash Bros. series. Several music tracks from the game appear in the game on Zelda-themed stages. Finally, Princess Zelda's design in Super Smash Bros. Ultimate is partially based on her incarnation from A Link to the Past and A Link Between Worlds, replacing her previous incarnations from Ocarina of Time and Twilight Princess.

=== Speedrunning ===
A Link to the Past is a popular game for speedrunning. It had the fourth highest number of players of all games listed on Speedrun.com in 2019, though it has since fallen to a lower position. It is commonly run at the Games Done Quick charity marathon, where it is often considered one of the highlights of the event. Many speedrunners also play using A Link to the Past: Randomizer, a mod that randomizes the locations of most of the items, in an attempt to evoke the uncertainty and excitement of playing the game for the first time.

=== Nintendo Switch Online ===
A Link to the Past was added to Nintendo Switch Online on September 5th, 2019, along with nineteen other SNES games. It was included at no additional charge with the other games on the service.
