= Cyber Citizen Shockman Zero =

1997 action video game

- Cover art for the 2017 re-release
- Developer: Masaya Games
- Publishers: NCS Corporation; Columbus Circle; Ratalaika Games (NS, PS4/5, XBO, XSX); Retro-Bit (SNES)
- Platforms: Satellaview; Super NES; Nintendo Switch; PlayStation 4; PlayStation 5; Xbox One; Xbox Series X/S
- Release: Satellaview: JP: March 20, 1997; Super NES: JP: June 30, 2017; WW: March 2025; Nintendo Switch, PlayStation 4/5, Xbox One, Xbox Series X/S: WW: July 5, 2024
- Genre: Action
- Modes: Single-player, multiplayer

Cyber Citizen Shockman Zero (Japanese: 改造町人シュビビンマン零, Hepburn: Kaizou Chōjin Shubibinman Zero) is a 1997 game for the Satellaview addon for the Super Famicom. It is a side-scrolling beat-'em-up developed by Masaya and published by NCS. It is the fourth and final game in the Cyber Citizen Shockman series, and the first on the SFC. The previous entries in the series were for the PC Engine.

== Plot ==
The game is not a direct sequel to previous Shockman games, and instead features two new protagonists: Raita and Azuki.

== Gameplay ==
Cyber Citizen Shockman Zero is a side scrolling action game, where the player can make use of both fighting techniques and beam attacks. Players take control of either Raita or Azuki. Raita fights like a boxer, using physical attacks, and Azuki, fights with a sword and together they can use combo attacks. It features two player co-operative play.

== Release ==
Cyber Citizen Shockman Zero was originally intended for a 1994 Super Famicom release, before being released on the Satellaview in 1997. Thus the game didn't have a physical release, making the game rare and hard to find for collectors.

In 2014, the company Extreme gained the copyright for the game from Nippon Computer Systems.

To commemorate the 20th anniversary of the game's release, Columbus Circle gave the game a Japan-only limited release on a physical Super Famicom cartridge. It was released on June 30, 2017 where it retailed for 6,998 yen and was distributed via Amazon.

It was released worldwide by Ratalaika Games for Nintendo Switch, PlayStation 4 and 5, Xbox One, and Xbox Series X/S on July 5, 2024 and was announced for the SNES cartridge by Retro-Bit for late 2024, with pre-orders arriving by March 2025. The re-release used an uncredited 2023 fan translation by Svambo.
