= Itoi Shigesato no Bass Tsuri No. 1 =

1997 fishing video game

- Original Super Famicom cover art
- Developer: HAL Laboratory
- Publisher: Nintendo
- Director: Akihiro Saito
- Producers: Satoru Iwata; Akihiko Koseki; Satoshi Yamato
- Designer: Shigesato Itoi
- Composer: Tadashi Ikegami
- Platforms: Nintendo 64, Satellaview, Super Famicom
- Release: Super Famicom: JP: February 21, 1997; Nintendo 64: JP: March 31, 2000
- Genre: Fishing
- Mode: Single-player

Itoi Shigesato no Bass Tsuri No. 1 (糸井重里のバス釣りNo. 1; "Shigesato Itoi's No. 1 Bass Fishing") is a fishing video game developed and released only in Japan for the Super Famicom on February 21, 1997 and updated for broadcast as eight different episodes on the Satellaview subsystem between April and November 1997. On March 31, 2000, the latest version of the game was released for the Nintendo 64 as the Definitive Edition (糸井重里のバス釣りNo. 1決定版!). The game allows the player to play as the creator of the game, Shigesato Itoi, and includes a host of animal characters who occasionally appear in the game. The SA-1 was used in the Super Famicom version.

== Gameplay ==
Screenshot of the Super Famicom version

Itoi Shigesato no Bass Tsuri No. 1 is set on the fictional Akahoshi Lake (赤星湖; "Red Star Lake") where the BAC (Bass Angler's Club) catch fish and compete in tournaments. There are several types of fish and there is a size-range within each type. The goal of the player is to catch the most and the largest fish possible as to compete in extra competitions such as quizzes. In order to have the greatest success in fishing, players must determine the most fruitful part of Lake Akahoshi given the weather conditions and the time of the day. The player is also able to select from a number of different lures that can be used to attract different species and different sizes of fish. The most sought-after fish in the game is the "over 80cm bass."

== Ports and related releases ==
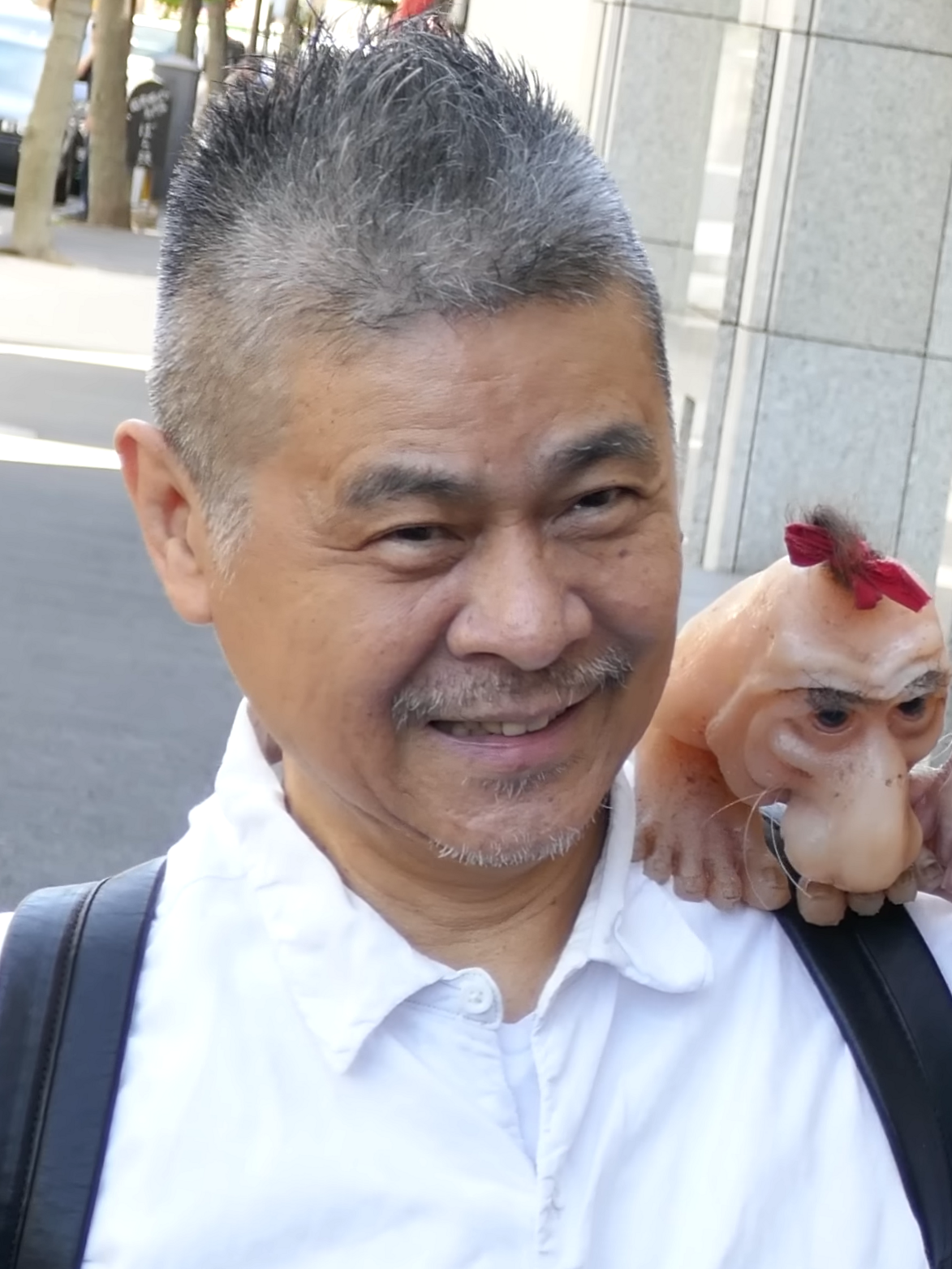
Creator and namesake Shigesato Itoi in 2016

In January 1997, Nintendo in collaboration with St.GIGA held a series of multiplayer contests allowing players of the Satellaview version of the game to compete on a national scale. Itoi himself participated in this event. The Satellaview competition event was divided into two divisions. The top 10 best scores from the General Division as well as the top 20 best scores in the Knockout Division would win a collectible Bass Tsuri No. 1-exclusive prize Lure. Each Lure was hand-painted and these prizes have become collector's items since the demise of the Satellaview. The top 100 best-scoring participants in both Divisions would additionally win Tournament original stickers, would have their names published on Nintendo's website, and would be listed in Satellaview enthusiast magazines of the time such as Bass Fishing No. 1 Weekly Magazine (週刊バス釣りNo. 1マガジン). This competition proved highly successful and its popularity prompted Nintendo and St.GIGA to run a second competition between April 27 and May 3, 1997.

In 2000, a Definitive Edition was developed and published for N64. A few changes have been made to give players a more in-depth playing experience. As such, support for a tackle-and-reel peripheral has been included to heighten gameplay realism. Force-feedback features have also been included to allow the controller (standard controller or tackle-and-reel) to vibrate realistically when a fish has been "hooked". Between March 31 and May 31, 2000, another competition was launched by Nintendo in collaboration with Famitsu magazine to promote the Definitive Edition of the game. Winners of this competition could win a free reel-and-tackle controllers, original Bass Tsuri No. 1-exclusive prize clothing, etc. By sending away for it, a select number of players could also win Bass Tsuri No. 1-exclusive prize Lures. Japanese comedian Takashi Fujii starred in television commercials for the game.

== Reception ==
Famitsu magazine rated the Definitive Edition for the Nintendo 64 a 30 out of 40.
