= Earth Defense Force (video game) =

1991 video game

- Arcade flyer
- Developer: Jaleco (Note: Ported to iOS by Dotemu.)
- Publisher: Jaleco
- Producer: Yuki Arai
- Programmer: Yuji Takahashi
- Artists: Nekomasa; Takeshi Shimizu
- Composer: Tsukasa Tawada
- Platforms: Arcade, Super Nintendo Entertainment System, iOS
- Release: Arcade: NA: January 1991; JP: March 1991; Super NES: JP: October 25, 1991; NA: January 1992; EU: 1992
- Genre: Scrolling shooter
- Modes: Single-player, multiplayer

E.D.F.: Earth Defense Force is a 1991 horizontally scrolling shooter video game developed and published by Jaleco for arcades. It was ported to the Super Nintendo Entertainment System as Super Earth Defense Force, dropping the two-player cooperative gaming mode while adding graphics and selectable weapons. The Super NES version was released in Japan on October 25, 1991, and in North America in January 1992. The Super NES version was eventually released on the Wii Virtual Console in Europe on October 29, 2010, and in 2011 for Japan on January 11, and North America on July 14. It was released on the Nintendo Classics service in September 2019.

== Gameplay ==
Released as a horizontal shooter game in the US in 1991, the object of Earth Defense Force is based on survival of the game's levels, punctuated by the defeat of bosses at the end of each one.

The player normally begins each level with three "shield" points, each able to absorb one enemy attack. The shield points are represented in the upper right corner by green squares under the heading "Shield". Additional shield points can be earned once a predetermined game score is reached. Up to five shield points are represented on screen, but a player can acquire more than five shield points, but they cannot be seen. This is extremely rare though, due to the difficulty of the game and the score intervals at which additional shield points are acquired. Loss of all shields results in the loss of one of three credits, or continues, and loss of all continues results in the player seeing the game over screen.

The game uses a unique leveling system, in which the player gains experience from defeated enemies to gain newer, more powerful versions of the weapons the player has access to.

== Development and release ==
Subsequent to its release an enhanced version was broadcast via the Super Famicom's Satellaview subsystem to Japanese gamers under the title BS Super Earth Defense Force.

== Reception ==
Reception

Review scores
Publication	Score
ACE	(SNES) 850/1000
Famitsu	(SNES) 5/5, 6/5, 6/5, 5/5
Games-X	(SNES) 3.5/5
Nintendo Life	(SNES) 6/10
Total!	(SNES) 61%
VideoGames & Computer Entertainment	(SNES) 7/10
Zero	(ARC) 2.5/5
Control	(SNES) 48%
Electric Brain	(SNES) 78%
Game Boy	(SNES) 2/5, 2/5, 4/5, 3/5
Hippon Super!	(SNES) 8/10
Super Action	(SNES) 71%
The Super Famicom	(SNES) B+
Super Pro	(SNES) 43/100

In Japan, Game Machine listed Earth Defense Force as the eleventh most popular arcade game of April 1991. Power Play said the game offered little excitement and criticized the mediocre background graphics.

Super Earth Defense Force received a 22.12/30 score in a 1993 readers' poll conducted by Super Famicom Magazine, ranking among Super Famicom titles at the number 73 spot. The game also received average reviews from critics.
