= St.GIGA =

Defunct Japanese satellite radio broadcaster

Satellite Digital Audio Broadcast Co., Ltd.

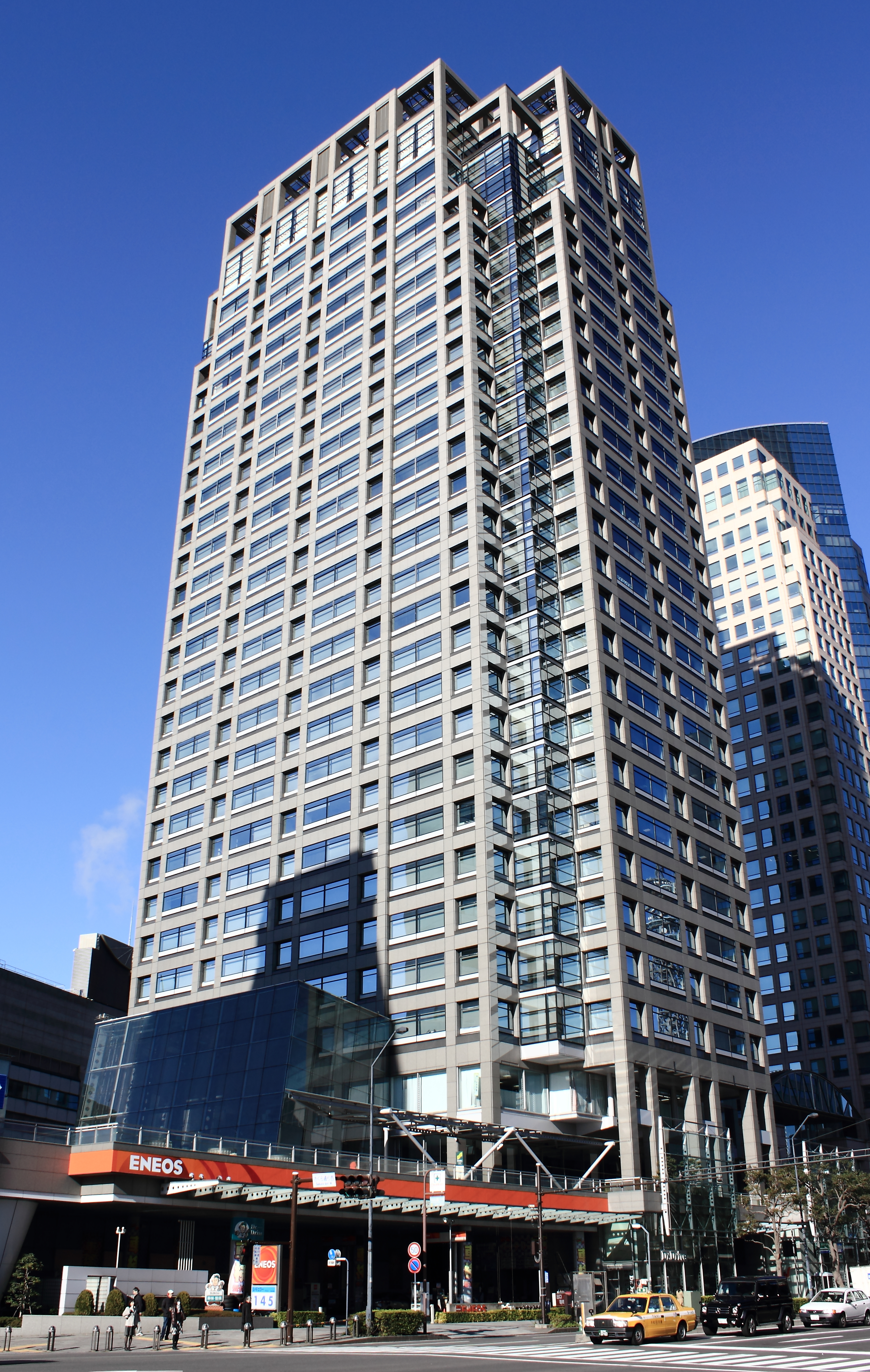
- St.GIGA's former headquarters in Yokohama (2001–2003)
- Trade name: St.GIGA
- Native name: 株式会社衛星デジタル音楽放送
- Romanized name: Kabushiki-gaisha Eisei Dejitaru Ongaku Hōsō
- Type: Subsidiary
- Industry: Satellite radio
- Founded: 2 April 1990
- Defunct: 31 March 2003
- Fate: Merged with WireBee
- Successor: Club Cosmo
- Headquarters: Akasaka, Tokyo
- Area served: Japan
- Key people: Hiroshi Yokoi (director)
- Products: Satellite radio stations; Satellaview; Soundtrack albums; Tuners
- Parent: WOWOW (1990–2003); WireBee (2003); World Independent Networks Japan (2003–2007)
- Subsidiaries: Studio St.GIGA
- Website: www.stgiga.co.jp (Archive)

Satellite Digital Audio Broadcast Co., Ltd. (株式会社衛星デジタル音楽放送, Kabushiki-gaisha Eisei Dejitaru Ongaku Hōsō), trading as St.GIGA (セント・ギガ, Sento Giga), was a Japanese satellite radio company headquartered in Akasaka, Tokyo. The company was established on 2 April 1990 as a subsidiary of the television station provider WOWOW, achieving a cult following through its "Tide of Sound" nature sounds recording broadcasts and its nonstandard methodology. By 1994, St.GIGA was struggling financially due to Japan's economic stagnation affecting the demand for its ambient music, as consumers became reluctant to invest in satellite tuners.

In 1995, St.GIGA partnered with Nintendo to produce the Satellaview, a peripheral for the Super Famicom that allowed games to be played through satellite broadcasts. Though the peripheral was successful, St.GIGA's financial state and inability to secure a proper broadcast license dissolved the relationship between the two companies, with Nintendo ceasing production of new content in March 1999. St.GIGA ran the Satellaview's servers until June 2000, leaving the video game industry entirely to focus on its radio stations and music licensing. After a significant downturn in its finances and nearing bankruptcy, St.GIGA merged with radio station provider WireBee in 2003 and was rebranded as Club Cosmo. In 2006, St.GIGA's content licensing rights were sold to World Independent Networks Japan (WINJ), which broadcast reruns of St.GIGA music until 2007.

St.GIGA is credited as being the world's first digital satellite radio station. The Satellaview has received praise for being ahead of its time, particularly for St.GIGA's method of distributing and broadcasting high-quality audio and recordings. Its music has also inspired other Japanese radio stations and musicians, such as Yoshio Ojima.

== History ==
Broadcast between 11 March 1990 and 28 November 2007, St.GIGA has undergone a number of changes of both carrier satellite and broadcast band. The following is a condensed history of these changes:

- 2 April 1990 – St.GIGA is founded.
- 1990 – St.GIGA began broadcasts on BS-3ch via the BS-2a satellite.
- August 1991 – St.GIGA switched to the BS-3b satellite, and in September it began broadcasting on BS-5ch.
- 23 April 1995 – Broadcasts begin to the Super Famicom add-on, Satellaview.
- April 1999 – Nintendo withdraws support.
- 30 June 2000 – Last Satellaview broadcast.
- 1 December 2000 – St.GIGA began simultaneous broadcasts on Radio 333ch (Data broadcasting via 633 and 636ch).
- 21 March 2003 – St.GIGA becomes Club COSMO.
- 1 October 2003 – Club COSMO sold to WINJ.
- 2005 – Club COSMO's 5ch broadcasts became analog (31 March) and the switch to 333ch was completed (10 May).
- 2006 – WINJ begins St.GIGA rebroadcasts.
- 28 November 2007 – All affiliated broadcast bands are terminated and the satellite broadcast certificate is revoked.

=== Origins and early success (1990–1994) ===
In 1990, the Japanese satellite television company WOWOW decided to expand their services into the field of satellite radio. The core management team made the executive decision to create a subsidiary named St.GIGA. The name was selected by a popular poll of "persons on the streets" because the executives agreed that they knew nothing about music. In deciding whom to hire as director for the subsidiary, Hiroshi Yokoi (横井宏) (who had recently designed the successful J-Wave FM) was selected as an innovator in the field. Soon after accepting the position, Yokoi crafted a radical proposal for the station concept. The initial reaction at WOWOW was skeptical; however within a few months of traditional satellite radio broadcasts, Yokoi's concept was given probationary adoption, and Yokoi was subsequently given full discretion to shape the company's future.

In accordance with Yokoi's conception, St.GIGA's broadcasts initially followed no externally fixed (or artificial) timetable. Rather, they were based upon the cyclical motif of a 24-hour "tide table" where broadcast themes were approximately matched to the current tidal cycle according to the rule of twelfths throughout the 24-hour broadcasting period. Under this innovative schedule, the station broadcast a variety of primarily ambient music programs including Music Tide (音楽潮流, Ongaku Chōryū), various jazz programs, and Tide Table (タイド・テーブル, Taido . Teburu) (featuring live sound-broadcasts of the ocean shore). The beginnings and ends of programs were not clearly demarcated and instead utilized the unprecedented "Tide of Sound" (音の潮流, Oto no Chōryū) method where songs of one genre would gradually flow into and intersperse with the songs from the prior genre until the new genre became predominant. The intent, according to Yokoi was to allow the listener to relax in a wave of sound "like a baby sleeps in the womb." "Tide of Sounds" broadcasts operated under a principle of "No Commercials, No DJs, No News Broadcasts, No Talk." Unlike most commercial-driven radio broadcasts, this was made possible for St.GIGA due to its reliance on a subscription digital radio service. In order to receive this service, the subscriber was required to obtain a special decoder, to pay an initiation fee, and subsequent monthly fees. "Tide of Sounds" broadcasts often took the form of high-quality digital recordings of nature sounds accompanied by spoken word narration by an actor as the "Voice". Throughout the life span of "Tide of Sounds" broadcasts, the part of the "Voice" would be played by a number of notable Japanese poets, including, among others, Ryo Michiko. "Voice" performances often consisted of all new poetry composed specifically for the show.

St.GIGA also broadcast its B-mode audio programming (a series of all classical music broadcasts) over analog broadcasting frequency bands that were shared with its parent, the satellite broadcasting company WOWOW. Highly artistic and experimental, the St.GIGA sound became extremely popular within certain segments of the population, and the station was recognized for its innovative concept, unique vision, and nonstandard methodology.

The initial popularity of the music funded trips by St.GIGA biomusic recorders to travel abroad to record at such exotic locations as England, Canary Islands, Mikonos, Venice, Bali, Tahiti, Martinique, Hanson Island (BC), and Maui. St.GIGA was also able to release a number of thematic books including the multi-volume St.GIGA Stylebook, Current of dreams: An introduction St.GIGA programming (Yume no choryu: St.Giga hensei soron) (containing the full text of Yokoi's original concept proposal), and Trends in Dreaming - St.GIGA's Hiroshi Yokoi's General Office (夢の潮流 -St.GIGA編成総論横井宏著 発行所).

St. Giga and other satellite radio broadcasters found it hard to attract paying subscribers as Japan's recession made consumer reluctant to invest in the expensive antennas and tuners needed to pick up satellite broadcasts.

— Billboard Magazine, July 23, 1994

St.GIGA sold a variety of products ranging from program guides to "sound calendars" to fragrances. The company also released a number of CDs under St.GIGA's own label as well as a variety of foreign labels such as the Hearts of Space, and music by Deep Forest.

=== Nintendo relationship and Satellaview (1994–2000) ===
From 23 April 1995 to 30 June 2000, St.GIGA broadcast video game data for such games as BS Super Mario USA which were only playable with Nintendo's Satellaview subsystem.

Unlike St. Giga's regular programming, the new data service will feature paid advertising. Nintendo president Hiroshi Yamauchi [said] that Nintendo expects to sell 2 million adapter/cassette packages a year.

— Billboard Magazine, July 23, 1994

By 1994, St.GIGA's financial difficulties resulted in the cutting back of "Tide of Sound" broadcasts. The company's portion of the subscription-funded audio broadcasts were to be replaced under subcontract by an all new series of advertising-funded Satellite Data broadcasts, managed under the "rescue" and executive control of Nintendo, St.GIGA's largest shareholder at 19.5%.

Beginning on 23 April 1995, St.GIGA broadcast video-game-related data to owners of the Super Famicom's Satellaview peripheral created by Nintendo. This device bolts onto the underside of the Super Famicom in a manner similar to the later Nintendo 64DD's attachment to the Nintendo 64 and the Game Boy Player's attachment to the GameCube. Only released to the Japanese market, the Satellaview acted as a satellite modem, allowing players to download broadcast data. The resulting games were then stored on requisite specialized rewritable storage cartridges at an additional launch price of 14,000 yen ($143).

The broadcast content ranged from video-game-related Satellaview news and specific interest journals such as Game Tiger's big House (ゲーム虎の大穴, Gemu Tora no OoAna) to expansion data for popular Super Famicom games (including, for example, Chrono Trigger) and all new video game releases including titles in such flagship series as The Legend of Zelda, Super Mario, and Kirby. Additionally, a number of these broadcasts featured an updated version of St.GIGA's earlier "Tide of Sounds" "Voice," now called "SoundLink" (サウンドリンク), with which St.GIGA voice actors would provide a live vocal track to accompany games, setting plot and describing in-game goals.

Due to the rewritability of the cartridges, the fact that "SoundLink" broadcasts were not downloaded to the game cartridges but rather were streamed live during the noon–2 a.m. Super Famicom Hour broadcasting time, and because the broadcast game data have never been rereleased by Nintendo, these games have become extremely rare. The subculture of collectors and enthusiasts that has grown online have exerted much effort engaged in electronic archaeology by extracting old data from heavily rewritten data cartridges in order to faithfully reproduce the games via emulation.

Aside from St.GIGA's "SoundLink" or broadcasts accompanying the transmission of data for its "Soundlink Games" (サウンドリンクゲーム), St.GIGA also broadcast a wealth of information on talk shows and celebrity idols, including a variety show. Broadcast times were fitted to match the schedules of students, and the station's audience demographics shifted radically much to the disappointment of the station's former ambient music fans. Before long the station had ceased transmissions of all "Time & Tide" programs (those featuring new age music) including the much-admired Tidal Currents (潮の潮流, Shio no Chōryū).

Carrying a "cumulative debt of 8.8 billion yen" as of March 1998, a Reuters report on 21 August 1998 indicated St.GIGA's rejection of Nintendo's debt management proposal as well as the broadcaster's failure to apply for renewal of its governmental satellite license. This resulted in the withdrawal of Nintendo's five executive staff, and the withdrawal of all current and proposed programming plans by Nintendo, Kyocera, and "many content providers", that had been intended for launch in 2000; though Nintendo's 19.7% ownership portfolio remained intact. St.GIGA continued Satellaview broadcasts after this point; however, the company could only broadcast reruns of games previously transmitted as Nintendo had discontinued its supply of new original content as of March 1999. Facing economic difficulties again, St.GIGA discontinued its Satellaview broadcasts on 30 June 2000 in order to return focus to music broadcasts as had been done prior to the Nintendo deal.

=== Decline and dissolution (2000–2006) ===
By 2001, St.GIGA was nearly bankrupt and entered into merger talks with WireBee Inc. (株式会社ワイヤービー, Kabushikigaisha Waiyabi) with which it became associated for the remainder of its lifespan. St.GIGA was rechristened Club COSMO (クラブコスモ, Kurabukosumo) under the leadership of Shinichi Matsuo (松尾信一). Broadcasts continued until 1 October, when the company was forced to sell its licensing rights to World Independent Networks Japan Inc. (WINJ). WireBee immediately began bankruptcy procedures, and all recording instruments and 241 tapes of nature sounds were auctioned off at open market for a total divided sale price of ¥5 million. Discussions concerning Club COSMO's involvement under WINJ's oversight in a new reality show were circulated briefly at this time, however to date no such show has been produced.

In 2006, WINJ began broadcasting reruns of St.GIGA's original "Tide of Sound" and "Time & Tide" broadcasts during a 2–4 p.m. time slot; however, on 1 November of the same year, these broadcasts were suspended on the pretext of broadcasting equipment maintenance. The program was scheduled to resume in the 2007 fiscal year. However, on 14 November 2007, Hiroya Masuda the Minister of Internal Affairs revoked the broadcasting certificate under Act 54 of Article 24 of the Japanese General Broadcasting Statute.

== See also ==
- WOWOW
- Broadcasting Satellite System Corporation
