= Satellaview =

Video game console peripheral

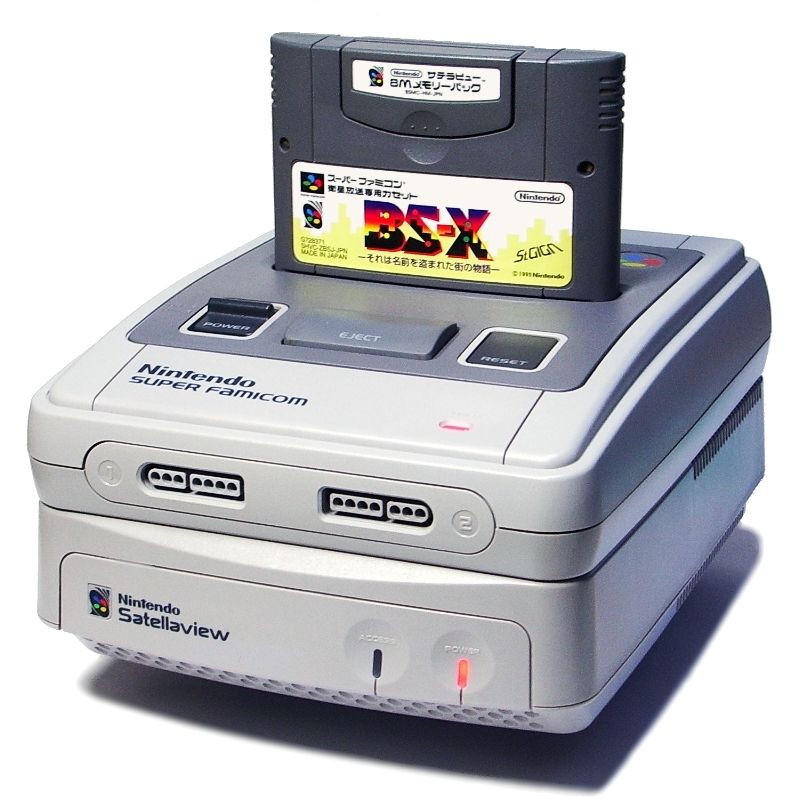
- Super Famicom with attached Satellaview
- Developer: Nintendo R&D2; St.GIGA
- Manufacturer: Nintendo
- Type: Video game console peripheral
- Generation: Fourth
- Released: JP: April 23, 1995
- Discontinued: JP: June 30, 2000
- Media: ROM cartridge, flash memory
- Storage: Game Pak, 8 Mb Memory Pak
- Predecessor: Family Computer Network System
- Successor: Nintendo 64DD

The Satellaview (Note: Japanese: サテラビュー, Hepburn: Saterabyū) is a satellite modem peripheral for the Super Famicom, produced by Nintendo as part of the fourth generation of video game consoles. It was released in Japan on April 23, 1995, as the successor to the Famicom's Network System. Containing a megabyte of ROM space and 512 kilobytes of RAM, the Satellaview allowed players to download games, magazines, and other media through satellite broadcasts provided by St.GIGA. Players purchased or rented a broadcast satellite tuner. It attaches to the expansion port on the bottom of the Super Famicom. The Satellaview received extensive support from third-party developers, including SquareSoft, Taito, Konami, Capcom, and Seta.

By 1994, St.GIGA, known in Japan for its "Tide of Sound" nature sound music, was struggling financially due to the Japanese recession reducing demand for music. Nintendo acquired a stake in St.GIGA to help financially restructure it. Nintendo Research & Development 2, the same team that designed the Super Famicom, began developing the Satellaview, which was designed for an adult audience. St.GIGA provided the satellite and broadcasting services, while Nintendo and other developers produced content. The Satellaview library comprised 114 games, including remakes of Famicom and Super Famicom games and original games such as Sutte Hakkun (1997).

The Satellaview's user base peaked at more than 100,000 in March 1997, but its adoption was hindered by the introduction of technologically superior fifth-generation consoles such as the Sega Saturn, PlayStation, and Nintendo 64, as well as its high cost and limited availability. By 1998, Nintendo's relationship with St.GIGA had deteriorated due to St.GIGA's refusal of a debt-management plan and failure to secure a government broadcasting license. Nintendo withdrew support for the Satellaview in March 1999. Later that year, it released a successor, the 64DD, for the Nintendo 64, partnering with Recruit for networking features after St.GIGA refused involvement. St.GIGA discontinued Satellaview broadcasts on June 30, 2000, due to a lack of sponsors and a dwindling user base, and declared bankruptcy in 2001.

Retrospectively, video game journalists have praised the Satellaview for its technological innovations and its game library quality, particularly of the Legend of Zelda series. It has developed a cult following due to much of its library being presumed lost. Video game preservation groups have worked to recover Satellaview games and services and host them online.

== History ==
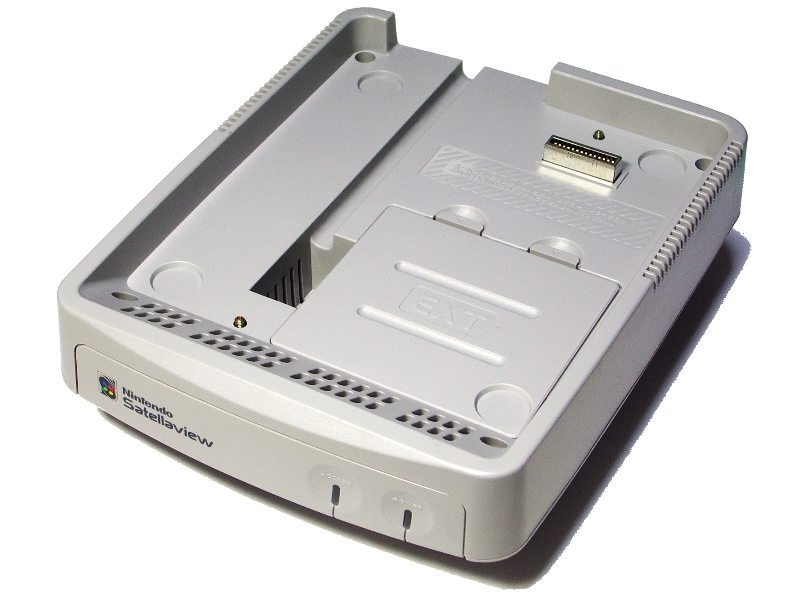
A standalone Satellaview device

Founded in early 1990, St.GIGA was a satellite radio subsidiary of the Japanese satellite television company WOWOW Inc., based in Akasaka, Tokyo. Credited as the world's first digital satellite radio station, it was maintained by Hiroshi Yokoi and best known for its "Tide of Sound" broadcasts, which were high-quality digital recordings of nature sounds accompanied by a spoken word narrator known as the "Voice". The company was initially a success, and is recognized for its innovative concept and nonstandard methodology. It later began releasing albums featuring its own music as well as foreign music such as Hearts of Space and various compositions by Deep Forest, and various pieces of merchandise such as program guides and "sound calendars". By 1994, St.GIGA struggled financially due to the Japanese Recession reducing consumer spending on ambient music and satellite systems. Nintendo purchased a 19.5% stake in St.GIGA in May, as a way to "rescue" the company and help to successfully restructure it.

Satellaview development began shortly after the acquisition, reportedly in production alongside the Virtual Boy and Nintendo 64. Nintendo had previously developed the Family Computer Network System peripheral for the Super Famicom's predecessor, the Famicom. Its lead designer, Masayuki Uemura, said that Nintendo's experiences with the Network System led to the development of the Satellaview. While Nintendo was producing the peripheral, St.GIGA revamped its broadcasting schedule to include a new programming block, the "Super Famicom Hour" providing gameplay tips and news for Nintendo's upcoming Super Famicom games. St.GIGA would provide the necessary satellite and broadcasting services, and host many of its older music and Tide of Sound broadcasts, and Nintendo and other third-party developers would create games and other content for the service. Nintendo stressed to video game publications that much of Satellaview's content, specifically St.GIGA broadcasts, were primarily for adults, with video games constituting only a small portion of airtime.

Nintendo officially announced Satellaview on December 21, 1994, at a retail price of ¥14,000, or US$150 (equivalent to $330 in 2025). Several third-party developers, such as Capcom, Taito, Konami, Seta, and SquareSoft, then announced plans to produce Satellaview games. The peripheral was designed by Nintendo Research & Development 2, the same team that had designed the Super Famicom. Though Nintendo was in a slump due to falling Super Famicom game sales and the Virtual Boy's failure, its management remained confident in Satellaview's success and would help calm any consumer concerns; company president Hiroshi Yamauchi expected to sell roughly 2 million Satellaview units each year. Pre-orders were available beginning February 25, 1995. Broadcasting services for Satellaview launched on April 1, and the peripheral was released on April 23. It was only sold via mail order, instead of being released into stores.

Satellaview was never released outside Japan, which some publications cited as being due to expensive costs of digital satellite broadcasting, and due to a supposed lack of appeal to American consumers. When the service first launched, St.GIGA had a number of issues regarding broadcasting video games and video game-related services through the Satellaview service, such as legal issues with other companies and technical restraints of the time. In June 1996, Nintendo announced a potential partnership with Microsoft to release a similar service for Windows, which would combine St.GIGA's broadcasting services with dial-up Internet; this was never launched. By March 1997, St.GIGA reported that Satellaview had 116,378 active users.

By mid 1998, Nintendo's relationship with St.GIGA began to deteriorate. St.GIGA refused a debt-management plan created by Nintendo to reduce the firm's capital, though having ¥8.8 billion in debt, and had also failed to apply for a government digital satellite broadcasting license by a deadline. This led to Nintendo halting all production of new games and content for the peripheral beginning March 1999, and to cancel content and services via a new BS-4 satellite. St.GIGA continued to supply content for Satellaview, broadcasting reruns of older content and making the service only for video games. Satellaview was fully discontinued on June 30, 2000, due to a severe lack of outside support and a dwindling player base, dropping by nearly 60% from its peak in 1997 to about 46,000 active subscribers. One year later, St.GIGA declared bankruptcy and merged with Japanese media company WireBee, Inc.

== Technical specifications ==
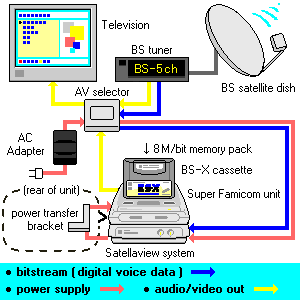
A diagram of Satellaview operation

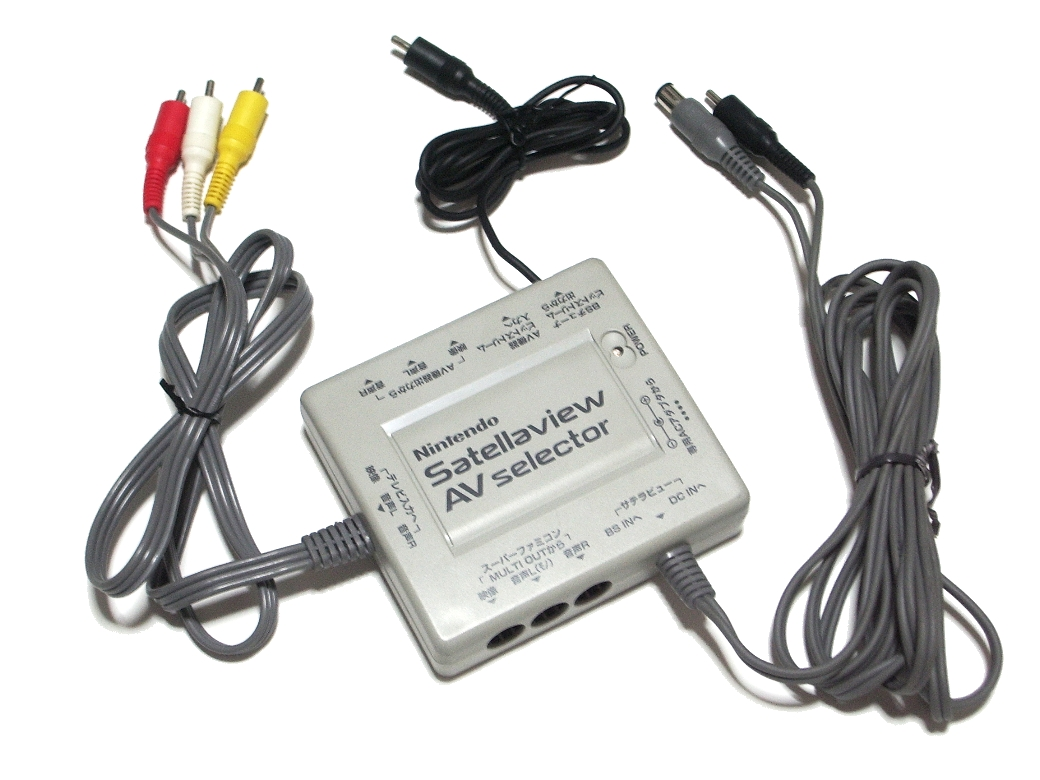
Satellaview AV selector

The Satellaview device connects to the expansion port on the underside of the Super Famicom, in a manner similar to peripherals such as the 64DD or the Sega CD. Each unit was packaged with a custom four-way AC adapter and AV selector for connecting the console to a BS (broadcast satellite) tuner. A power-transfer bracket supplies power to the Super Famicom. The device adds 1 megabyte of ROM, which contains the operating system, and 512 kilobytes of RAM.

The Satellaview service was provided free of charge and broadcast unscrambled, funded through sales of the device and advertising. Users were still required to purchase or rent a satellite dish and receiver, which could also be used for other BS television programming.

The required system cartridge, BS-X: Sore wa Namae o Nusumareta Machi no Monogatari (commonly translated as BS-X: The Town Whose Name Was Stolen), functions both as an interactive menu for the Satellaview service and as a standalone game. It presents a hub world styled after EarthBound, with buildings representing Satellaview's services. Players can create an avatar, purchase items, play minigames, read announcements from St.GIGA and Nintendo, and participate in contests. The cartridge also expands the Super Famicom's capabilities by providing additional RAM beyond that contained in the Satellaview unit. Game and broadcast data are stored on 8-megabit memory packs that insert into the top of this cartridge.

== Games and services ==
Winners of Satellaview competitions were awarded special prizes, such as Bemani Pocket games.

A total of 114 games were released for Satellaview; some are remakes or updates of older Family Computer and Super Famicom games, and others were created specifically for the service. Nintendo's popular franchises include Kirby, F-Zero, Fire Emblem, The Legend of Zelda, and Super Mario Bros. Nintendo's original games include Sutte Hakkun. EarthBound creator Shigesato Itoi designed a fishing game called Itoi Shigesato no Bass Tsuri No. 1. The previously unreleased Special Tee Shot, later reworked into Kirby's Dream Course, was released. Third-party games include SquareSoft's Radical Dreamers and Treasure Conflix, Pack-In-Video's Harvest Moon, Chunsoft's Shiren the Wanderer, Jaleco's Super Earth Defense Force, and ASCII's Derby Stallion '96. Soundlink games were broadcast with live voice acting by radio personalities and commentators. Unlike other Satellaview games, SoundLink games could only be played on a live schedule. Nintendo often held tournaments for certain games, such as Wario's Woods, that allowed players to compete for prizes.

Alongside games, Satellaview owners could access many other different services. Free magazines included video game publications like Famitsu and Nintendo Power and general Japanese publications focusing on news, music, or celebrity interviews. Soundlink magazines included commentary, often by popular Japanese personalities, such as Bakushō Mondai and All Night Nippon. St.GIGA broadcasts included "Tide of Sound" nature ambiance and other music. A special newsletter by both St.GIGA and Nintendo included service updates such as contests and upcoming events.

== Reception and legacy ==
Though having amassed a larger playerbase, and being widely-successful for St.GIGA, Nintendo viewed Satellaview as a commercial failure. The rise of technologically superior consoles such as Sega Saturn, PlayStation, and Nintendo 64, made consumers reluctant to purchase Satellaview, especially due to its exclusive availability via mail order delivery or specific electronic stores.

Retrospective feedback on Satellaview has been positive. Retro Gamer magazine applauded the peripheral for its technological achievements, providing an early form of online gaming years before the advent of services such as Xbox Live. It commended the overall quality of the game library, citing the definitive BS Legend of Zelda series. Nintendo World Report liked its uniqueness which will likely never be replicated on modern video game consoles, and its library of games and services. Shacknews listed it among Nintendo's most innovative products for its technological accomplishments and pioneering of online gaming. Kill Screen labeled Satellaview as "perhaps one of the most crucial early experiments in combining games with storytelling", specifically the Soundlink games and voice acting. They were disappointed at the loss of the entire Soundlink live content library upon discontinuation. Video Games Chronicle called it "an impressive and ingenious idea for the time, and an innovation that we see to a lesser degree now in terms of interactive television and episodic game installments from modern studios".

In 1999, Nintendo released a spiritual successor to Satellaview for Nintendo 64, the 64DD and its Randnet Internet service. Originally announced in 1995, a year prior to console launch, Randnet had many similar features, such as a Nintendo newsletter and online gaming, plus chat and email. Nintendo attempted to have St.GIGA transition from Satellaview to the 64DD, however, when St.GIGA refused, Nintendo instead partnered with Japanese media company Recruit to form Randnet. The 64DD was a commercial failure.

Satellaview has a large cult following since the late 2000s due to most of its content having been lost after the service was closed. Many video game preservationists and Nintendo fans have searched for memory packs to recover game data and preserve it online. Fans have created custom private servers that work with the official BS-X application cartridge, and translated certain games such as those from the Legend of Zelda series. In retrospective years, publications have raised concerns about the permanent loss of much Satellaview content, specifically live audio from Soundlink games and digital newsletters.

== See also ==
- Nintendo Power (cartridge)
