= Chrono Break =

Cancelled third mainline entry in the Chrono series of video games by Square

- Developer: Square
- Publisher: Square
- Series: Chrono
- Release: Cancelled
- Genre: Role-playing

Chrono Break was a cancelled third mainline entry in the Chrono series of video games by Square. While never officially announced by the company, commentary from Chrono series developers Masato Kato, Hironobu Sakaguchi, and Takashi Tokita have confirmed early plans for the game, alongside a number of trademarks filed in the game's name. However, the game would ultimately go unproduced, with many members of the internal development team either moving on to Final Fantasy XI or leaving the company in favor of freelance work. The game elicited much commentary from the company and the video game press in the following years, though as of 2021, all trademarks had expired, with no announced plans to work on the game.

== History ==
=== Registration ===
The initial Chrono Break trademark for a video game was registered by Square (now Square Enix) in the United States on December 5, 2001. A similar trademark was registered by the company in the European Union a week later.

The registration followed a press report of talks about a new Chrono series game. Within this report, Hironobu Sakaguchi stated that the development team of Chrono Cross, especially Masato Kato, was interested in creating a new game in the series, and that script and story ideas were currently being considered, but that the project had not yet been greenlighted. Kato had previously mentioned in the Ultimania guide for Chrono Cross that he wanted to create a direct sequel to Chrono Trigger to wrap up certain story elements and plot threads, but the pitfalls of a direct sequel prompted them to do Chrono Cross instead. The registration, and Sakaguchi's comments, led video game journalists to believe that a sequel to Chrono Trigger and Chrono Cross was in full development. IGN Editor Douglass Perry went as far as to say "...we're almost positive that you can expect to see this awaited monster in 2004." On November 13, 2003, the trademark was dropped in the U.S. It expired on December 14, 2011, in the European Union, and on July 26, 2012, in Japan. A similar trademark was registered in 2001 by Square Enix in Japan as Chrono Brake (Japanese: クロノ・ブレイク).

=== Official response ===
Inquiry over a new title was subsequently large enough to warrant an entry in Square Enix's FAQ page, in which the company noted that no new game was in development, though this did not mean the series was dead. In 2006, the entry was revised to include sequel inquiries for any series. After the release of Chrono Cross, a number of key staff from the title left Square to form a new development studio, Monolith Soft, which was initially owned by Namco and is currently a first-party developer working under Nintendo. Other staff who had worked on the title remained at Square and proceeded to work on Final Fantasy XI, an MMORPG conceived by Hironobu Sakaguchi – one of Chrono Trigger's creators. During an interview at E3 2003, this development team stated that they would love to develop a new Chrono game, but their commitment to Final Fantasy XI would keep them busy for a long time. Richard Honeywood, localization director for Square Enix, explained,

Final Fantasy XI is pretty much it for a while. We still have a lot of possible expansion packs we could do, and plenty of support to give. As far as Chrono is concerned, that's huge; but we can't do two or three things at the same time, and it's tough to do FFXI and another Chrono game at the same time or too close together. We'd love to do one though, but yeah, not yet.

Takashi Tokita, who directed Chrono Trigger, mentioned a "Chrono Trigger 2" in a 2003 interview which has not been translated to English. Trigger developer Yuji Horii expressed no interest in returning to the Chrono franchise in 2005. In February 2007, Square Enix producer Hiromichi Tanaka took part in several interviews while promoting games in Europe. Tanaka reiterated that no new game was in development, but that a return was certainly not out of the question.

... it's very difficult to be able to reunite the original team, to be able to make a sequel to the Chrono series ... because if we don't try to reunite these people but take other people instead, we will find ourselves at that point with a game which will feel different, since there would be different persons in charge, and we would possibly lose the Chrono spirit.

— Hiromichi Tanaka

In January 2008, composer Yasunori Mitsuda remarked that "there are a lot of politics involved" in creating a new game, and stressed that Masato Kato should participate in development should a new entry in the series materialize. He did say that he was open to working with the company on the series again "if they had a good concept for the game", and he speculated that Kato "probably would" as well.

In August 2014, at a PAX Prime panel, Sakaguchi stated that he had intended on continuing the Chrono series into another game, but that problems with Square Enix management prevented it from coming to fruition.

I think the statute of limitations has passed and expired so I think I'm okay saying this – but we just didn't see eye-to-eye with management, and so I went and fought for it, and I officially lost the battle ... Nothing's confirmed. But again, it would be nice to be able to work on a continuation of my old creations.

— Hironobu Sakaguchi

In December 2015, Kato confirmed that Square Enix had indeed discussed a project called Chrono Break, but that he was personally not involved with it.

In December 2017, Tokita stated that some smaller elements of Chrono Break eventually made it into his Final Fantasy Dimensions II game. He explained: "There was actually a time when I planned a new title called Chrono Break. Though it was canceled before accomplishing anything, the overall idea for the title was carried over to my latest game, Final Fantasy Dimensions II. Aemo's character setting and the balance between the three characters at the beginning ... these were based on the original concept [for Chrono Break] but were reworked for this title." Tokita confirmed the following year that he had begun preproduction on the game in 2000, and ultimately recycled his story ideas for Final Fantasy Dimensions II.

== Aftermath ==
The February 2008 issue of Game Informer ranked the Chrono series eighth among the "Top Ten Sequels in Demand", naming the games "steadfast legacies in the Square Enix catalogue" and asking "what's the damn holdup?!". In Electronic Gaming Monthly's June 2008 "Retro Issue", writer Jeremy Parish cited Chrono as the franchise video game fans would be most thrilled to see a sequel to. In the first May Famitsu of 2009, Chrono Trigger placed 14th out of 50 in a vote of most-wanted sequels by the magazine's readers. At E3 2009, SE Senior Vice President Shinji Hashimoto remarked "If people want a sequel, they should buy more!" In 2012, a trademark for Chrono Bind by Square Enix lead Siliconera to speculate that the game had switched titles from Chrono Break to Chrono Bind; however, it was later revealed to merely be the name of a DLC card game in Final Fantasy XIII-2. In the same year, Kotaku expressed disappointment that Square Enix had not acted on the Chrono Break name, citing strong sales of the DS port of Chrono Trigger as a reason as to why the company should release a third game in the series. Siliconera described the game as "a beacon of hope" for the game's fanbase, as proof that the company had in the past plans to continue the series. Kato revealed in 2015 that he had no involvement with whatever project Square had begun to develop under the Chrono Break trademark, and that his idea for a final game would have involved Kid and other "all-star" characters rescuing Crono, Marle, and Lucca. Though acknowledging in this interview that his idea of an ending to the trilogy would "never come out", Kato then discussed his involvement in writing Another Eden, which notably features a frog knight character and time travel.
