= Karri (disambiguation) =

Karri is the common name of Eucalyptus diversicolor, a species of flowering plant.

Karri may also refer to:

- Karri (name), including a list of people with the given name and surname
- Karri, Iran, a village

== See also ==
- Kaari (disambiguation)
- Kairi (disambiguation)
- Karai (disambiguation)
- Kari (disambiguation)
- Karri forest, a forest type found in Australia
- Pterostylis karri, species of orchid
- Karri Chahar Bonicheh, a village in Iran
