= Radical Dreamers =

1996 video game

- Title screen depicting the Frozen Flame
- Developer(s): Square
- Publisher(s): Square
- Director(s): Masato Kato
- Artist(s): Yasuhiko Kamata
- Writer(s): Masato Kato; Makoto Shimamoto; Takashi Tanegashima; Daisuke Fukugawa; Miwa Shoda
- Composer(s): Yasunori Mitsuda
- Series: Chrono
- Platform(s): Super Famicom; Windows; Nintendo Switch; PlayStation 4; Xbox One
- Release: Super Famicom: JP: February 3, 1996; Windows, NS, PS4, XBO: WW: April 7, 2022
- Genre(s): Visual novel
- Mode(s): Single-player

Radical Dreamers (Note: Original subtitled in Japanese as Nusumenai Hōseki (Japanese: 盗めない宝石; lit. "The Unstealable Jewel"). The 2022 English translation is subtitled Le Trésor Interdit, French for "The Forbidden Treasure".) is a 1996 text-based visual novel adventure video game developed and published by Square for the Satellaview, a satellite peripheral for the Super Famicom. It forms part of the Chrono series, acting as a side story to the 1995 game Chrono Trigger. A version of the game is included with Chrono Cross: The Radical Dreamers Edition, which was released worldwide on April 7, 2022, for Windows, the Nintendo Switch, the PlayStation 4 and the Xbox One.

The game centers around an infiltration carried out by the titular thief gang led by Kid; aided by Serge and Magil, she seeks an artifact called the Frozen Flame and revenge on its keeper Lord Lynx. Players navigate the mansion's environments and impact the story's progression through text choices. Chrono Trigger writer Masato Kato both directed and wrote the main scenario. Due to his attitude at the time, the plot and tone were considerably darker than Chrono Trigger, though the additional scenarists wrote alternate scenarios with comedic tones. The music was scored by Yasunori Mitsuda, who had worked on Chrono Trigger. Production was completed in three months, and Kato was left unsatisfied with its quality.

As with most Satellaview titles, Radical Dreamers did not receive a lasting commercial release at the time, and was exclusive to Japan. Attempts to bundle the game with the PlayStation port of Chrono Trigger were stopped by Kato due to quality concerns. The ROM for the game was released onto the web, allowing for the production of an English fan translation. While limited, the original's coverage in news and fan sites have praised its narrative and tone. Kato would use plot elements from Radical Dreamers in his next game Chrono Cross.

== Gameplay ==
Gameplay consists of word-based scenarios presented to the player through the narration of the main character, Serge. As the narrative progresses, the game presents a list of possible actions and the player chooses from them. Depending on the choices made, the player may enter a new area, be presented with a new situation or character, or have to choose again if the previous selection was incorrect. In combat with enemies, the player must select from options such as "Fight", "Magic", "Run", and often more complex situational commands like "Run my knife into the goblin's chest!" or "Quickly slash at its hand!". Some decisions must be made before an invisible timer runs out; in combat, hesitation results in injury or death. Serge's health is tracked by an invisible point count, restored by various events (such as finding a potion). The game also tracks Kid's affection for Serge, influenced by battles and scripted events. Her feelings determine whether Serge survives the story's climactic fight.

Radical Dreamers features minimal graphics and animation; most areas are rendered with dim, static backgrounds. The game also uses atmospheric music and sounds. Like other Chrono games, Radical Dreamers contains a variant of New Game + mode. Only one scenario is available on the first play-through; after finishing it and obtaining one of three possible endings, players can explore six others. These later stories often feature comical situations or allusions to Chrono Trigger.

== Characters and story ==
Radical Dreamers features three protagonists—Serge, Kid, and Magil—who seek out treasure as venturesome, reputable thieves. The young adult narrator, Serge, is a drifting musician who met Kid by chance three years ago in a remote town. Serge enjoys adventure with a carefree attitude. Kid, only sixteen years old, is a renowned professional thief with a reputation for boisterous behavior. Possessing a turbulent history, Kid dubiously fancies herself as a kind of Robin Hood. Magil is an enigmatic, handsome masked man skilled in magic who rarely speaks and can fade into shadow at will. Crowned by flowing, blue hair, Magil accompanied Kid well before Serge joined the group. They seek the Frozen Flame, a mythic artifact capable of granting any wish. It is hidden in Viper Manor—the home of a terrible and powerful aristocrat named Lynx, who gained control of the estate after usurping power from and killing the Acacia Dragoons, a familial unit of warriors.

The party confronts Lynx near the Frozen Flame.

Following Kid, the group infiltrates Viper Manor on the night of a full moon. While sneaking through the corridors, they battle goblins and other creatures of legend while unraveling the history of the manor and its occupants. Magil explains that the Frozen Flame is a fragment of the massive, extraterrestrial creature known as Lavos, splintered off when Lavos impacted the planet in prehistory and burrowed to its core. The thieves locate Lynx and the Frozen Flame deep within an underground ruin of the Kingdom of Zeal—an ancient, airborne civilization destroyed after it awakened Lavos in search of immortality. Serge discovers that Kid is an orphan, hoping to exact revenge upon Lynx for killing her caretaker, Lucca. Kid attempted to find Lynx in her childhood after Lucca's death, but was stopped and saved from certain defeat by Magil, who accompanied her thereafter.

The trio battle Lynx for the Frozen Flame, and Lynx gains the upper hand after trapping Magil with a powerful spell. He plans to acquire Kid's special gift from Lucca—a Time Egg, or Chrono Trigger. With a Time Egg and the Frozen Flame, Lynx boasts that he shall achieve control over time. Kid lunges at him, but Lynx easily parries her attack and wounds her. She desperately removes the Chrono Trigger from her back pocket. The Trigger shatters and causes a localized temporal distortion, leading Serge to see various scenes in history. Kid learns of her heritage as princess Schala of Zeal, a meek girl who was coerced to help awaken Lavos with her magical power. As Zeal collapsed, Schala was wracked with anguish and guilt for her role in the incident. Nearby in the Ocean Palace, the Frozen Flame felt her grief and changed her to a baby, sending her to the modern era where Lucca found her. It is also circumstantially revealed that Magil is in fact Magus, Schala's wayward brother who searched for her after battling Lavos in Chrono Trigger. Once the distortion subsides, an army from Porre—a large nation in search of the Frozen Flame—storms the mansion. Lynx withdraws as Kid, Serge, and Magil flee. Kid tells Serge that she is aware of her true origin, and knowing that is a treasure which cannot be stolen. She bids him goodbye before disappearing into the darkness with Magil.

Other scenarios are available after players complete the first. These include both humorous and serious variations of the main plot.

- "Magil: Love! Folly! Elopement!" – Magil is actually a lifelong friend of Riddel who courts her. When the manor is alerted to his presence, Magil throws Riddel over his shoulder and dashes off into the morning sun as her proud father Lynx tearily bids goodbye.
- "Kid and the Sunflower" – Kid insults a lecherous sunflower who transforms her into a malicious monster. Serge must kiss her to change her back, or use a special dagger to take her soul at risk of his own soul's capture. Three endings are available.
- "The Great Space Chase!" – Magil is a space cop searching for Lynx, secretly a green Martian creature with tentacles. Magil's rock guitar forces Lynx out of hiding, and Serge assaults him with a Lesser Martian Bunny Bun-Bun.
- "Homecoming: Felicia’s Light" – Kid learns that Lynx and her caretaker Felicia are trapped in a magical seal as part of Lynx's effort to escape a spirit prison. Felicia selflessly instructs Magil to destroy the Frozen Flame, killing Lynx forever.
- "Paradeus: The Mystery Mega-Weapon" – Serge finds an odd crystal inhabited by an entity named Ganju, who tests his strength with gladiatorial combat. Using Ganju's Paradeus mecha, Serge and Ganju challenge Mecha-Lynx for the Frozen Flame.
- "Death and the Realm of Shadow" – Kid accidentally summons Lilith, the Goddess of Death. She tries to take Kid's soul, but Magil intervenes. The outcome is slightly affected by Kid's affection for Serge.

== Development ==
Radical Dreamers was developed by Square, the company which had previously developed Chrono Trigger. Masato Kato wrote Radical Dreamers after Chrono Trigger's release, feeling that Trigger concluded with "unfinished business". He composed the main story and drafted the concepts for the sub-scenarios, leaving them to be completed by his peers. He allowed Makoto Shimamoto to write the entire "Kid and the Sunflower" segment, later joking that he "avoided having any part in that episode," while Miwa Shoda was in charge of the "Shadow Realm and the Goddess of Death" segment. According to scenario writer Daisuke Fukugawa (responsible for the game's "The Enigmatic Gigaweapon: Paradise X" subplot), the game's graphical content pushed the Satellaview's technical limits, requiring developers to redraw prerendered models until functional gameplay could be ensured. Compared to Chrono Trigger, the plot of Radical Dreamers had a bleak tone which Kato ascribed to his deep frustration and anger about coming to work every day following Chrono Trigger's hectic development. Specifically, Kid's "nihilistic" feelings were Kato's own expressions at the time. Kato intended both Dreamers and its eventual successor Chrono Cross to prompt players to pursue their personal dreams in life.

Due to being a small side project, there was a general sense of freedom compared to other Square titles. The decision to make it a text-based adventure helped push the game into its darker direction. Kato intended for it to be a survival adventure title, but abandoned this specific approach after the release of Resident Evil. The more comedic additional scenarios helped balance out the sombre elements in the main narrative. Reflecting on his work, Kato felt his work on Radical Dreamers helped solidify his style. Kato's team completed Radical Dreamers in only three months under a rushed production schedule, prompting him to label the game "unfinished" in an interview for the Ultimania Chrono Cross guide. Square had initially requested it be finished in two months. Kato regretted that the schedule hampered the quality of his work, and explained that the connections to Chrono Trigger were evoked towards the end of the project. The finished ROM totaled 8 megabits; the developers later reflected that the scenario was changed three times to work within this limited capacity.

=== Music ===
"Under the Moonlight"
A 45-second sample of "Under the Moonlight", illustrating the game's ambient musical atmosphere.

The music of Radical Dreamers was written by composer Yasunori Mitsuda, who scored Chrono Trigger and later Chrono Cross. During this time, Mitsuda was listening to Russian folk music, and used this style in the music for Radical Dreamers. He wrote the score in a very relaxed style, which he felt produced his best work at that time. Mitsuda wrote the music in around three months, and in retrospect thought it turned out well. Several themes and musical patterns were later adapted for Chrono Cross at Kato's suggestion; many appear unchanged except for new instrumentation. Mitsuda estimated that about half the music for Radical Dreamers was reused in Chrono Cross.

== Release ==
Radical Dreamers was announced in early 1996 as part of a collection of four titles produced by Square for the Satellaview platform. It was first released for broadcast starting February 3 that year. Subsequent broadcast periods were held through until March 8, with Square commenting that there were no plans to release the game in cartridge form. Famitsu promoted the game without any clear connections or references to Chrono Trigger. Owing to the eventual shutdown of the service, Radical Dreamers became impossible to play except on end users' cartridges that had the game installed during its broadcast period. It also received no English release due to the Satellaview's Japanese exclusivity. Square originally wanted to include the game as part of the PlayStation port of Chrono Trigger, but Kato stopped them due to his dissatisfaction with the final product. While he had the option of incorporating it into the Nintendo DS remake of Chrono Trigger, he did not due to its very different tone and questionable market demand. While uncertain about its quality in the gaming market at the time, at the time Kato was open to the possibility of releasing a version of Radical Dreamers.

In April 2003, the ROM hacking group Demiforce released a fan translation rendering Radical Dreamers in English. The patch works by modifying the ROM image of Dreamers used for playing console-based video games on personal computers through emulation. The ability to save games was not enabled with the first patch, and some minor typos were left in, later remedied by successive releases. On Christmas Day 2005, Demiforce and Radical R released the final version (1.4) of the translation, which fixed remaining minor bugs. The French team Terminus Traduction made a French translation patch soon after. Masato Kato did not perceive significant demand to include Radical Dreamers as a bonus with the release of Chrono Trigger DS, and omitted it to preserve continuity between Trigger and Cross. He expressed concern in 2009 over re-releasing Radical Dreamers "as-is", citing a need to revise the work.

On February 9, 2022, Square Enix announced that Radical Dreamers would receive a re-release as part of Chrono Cross: The Radical Dreamers Edition, as well as an official translation. It was released worldwide on April 7, 2022, for Windows, the Nintendo Switch, the PlayStation 4 and the Xbox One with English, French, Italian, Spanish and German translations.

== Reception ==
Website Cubed3 gave the game a score of 8/10, praising its excellent use of atmosphere and music despite the difficulties for potential players to access it. A reviewer for Home of the Underdogs lauded the game's excellent writing and the "superb" English translation patch, noting that the "interesting plot" would appeal to fantasy fans if they could stomach the limited interactivity. Having never played a Chrono game prior, the reviewer stated, "I was still able to follow the story and be drawn into the world of colorful characters." While praising the replay value afforded by the extra scenarios, the critic derided the random battles of Radical Dreamers, writing that "RPG-style random combat doesn't translate well to [a] text-only medium." The website awarded Dreamers "Top Dog" status, and the game maintains a voter score of 8.95 out of 10. Chris Kohler, in his 2004 book Power-Up: How Japanese Video Games Gave the World an Extra Life, cited Radical Dreamers' soundtrack as a precursor to Mitsuda's explicitly Celtic musical style in Xenogears.

== Legacy ==
Radical Dreamers preceded Chrono Cross, a full role-playing video game sequel to Chrono Trigger. Masato Kato cited the desire to "redo Radical Dreamers properly" as the genesis of Cross, attributing the latter's serious atmosphere to the former. Kato's desire to finish the story of the characters Kid and Serge principally shaped the plot of Cross. Several events in Chrono Cross, such as the infiltration of Viper Manor, were also a direct reference to events in Radical Dreamers. He also incorporated Radical Dreamers into the plot of Chrono Cross as an alternate timeline. The character Gil, confirmed by Kato to be Magus, was going to be featured in Chrono Cross. This idea was scrapped due to difficulties in representing the story of Magus among the game's numerous other characters; the unrelated, enigmatic magician Guile was created instead.
