= Characters of Chrono Cross =

Serge (center) with some of the playable characters of Chrono Cross. First row: Mojo, Macha, Doc, Mel, Guile, Sprigg, and Starky. Second row: Razzly, Glenn, Leena, Kid, Nikki, and Sneff. Third row: Van, Harle, Norris, Radius, Irenes, and Pierre. Fourth row: Draggy, Greco, Luccia, Korcha, Janice, Zappa, and Poshul. Bottom left: Pip. Bottom right: NeoFio.

Chrono Cross (クロノ・クロス, Kurono Kurosu) is a role-playing video game developed and published by Square (now Square Enix) for the PlayStation video game console. It is the successor to Chrono Trigger, which was released in 1995 for the Super Nintendo Entertainment System.

While its predecessor, like most role-playing games at the time, only offered a handful of playable characters, Chrono Cross was notable for making 45 different characters available for recruitment over the course of the game, each with distinct backstory and speech patterns. The game's writer, Masato Kato, started with the core characters from Radical Dreamers, a rare, Japan-only visual novel he felt ultimately went unfinished, and greatly expanded the cast and scenario, while leaving the creation of some minor characters to various other members of the development team. The developers also created an "auto accent program", to apply accents and other quirks to character's dialogue, making the dialogue altered depending on who was present in the player's party.

Reception for the game from critics was very positive, with some publications, such as GameSpot, even giving the game a perfect score. However, reception for the cast of characters was more mixed; some critics were impressed by the quantity, variety, and individuality offered by the characters, where others complained of an emphasis of "quantity over quality".

== Creation and influences ==
=== Radical Dreamers ===
A few of the core characters from Chrono Cross originate from an earlier game titled Radical Dreamers. Chrono series writer Masato Kato felt that the first game in the series, Chrono Trigger, did not wrap up all its story arcs, and as such, wrote the story of Radical Dreamers to conclude some aspects of it. However, due to the rushed nature of the development schedule, it being a short, text based visual novel, and being released on an obscure add-on for the Super Famicom, the Satellaview, Kato would label the game "unfinished", leading to the conception of a more complete game, which would be Chrono Cross. Serge, Kid, Lynx, Viper, Radius, and Riddel all originate from the game. Additionally, the Radical Dreamers character Magil, who is an amnesiac Magus from Chrono Trigger, was originally going to be the character Guile in Chrono Cross, before Kato wrote him out of the script, fearing he could not do the character justice in the massive scope of Chrono Cross. While Radical Dreamers characters were used as a base for the characters of Chrono Cross, Kato made changes as well. In Radical Dreamers, Serge acted as the game's narrator, rather than a silent protagonist, and Lynx, is just a regular human, rather than an anthropomorphic cat. With the release of Chrono Cross, the characters and events of Radical Dreamers were retconned as being from a similar but different alternate reality.

=== Conception ===
Once work on the actual Chrono Cross started, the initial vision beyond character recruitment was even more expansive. The game initially was intended to be able to have the player recruit any person they encountered, through either interacting or battling them. However, eventually the development team found this to be too ambitious, and narrowed it down to 64 playable characters, and then again down to 45 characters for the final game, which were then drawn by character designer Nobuteru Yūki. The backgrounds of some minor characters were left to members of the staff. The development team also considered the idea of having each character have their own ending, each with three variant scenarios based on events occurred in the game, leading to over 120 endings, but the idea was scrapped as being not feasible.

=== Parallel dimensions ===
The developers of Chrono Cross created a setting consisting of two parallel dimensions; the "Home World", where the game starts, and the "Alternate World", that is introduced shortly afterwards. The two worlds are used to illustrate the concept of the butterfly effect; both worlds have the same basic make-up, but show key differences that have resulted from one minor difference; the main character, Serge, died years ago in the "Alternate World". Some effects are direct, such as his mother no longer living in his home village, or that people he knew in the "Home World" no longer recognizing him in the "Alternate World". Others are far more indirect, with his absence leading other characters to make different decisions in their lives, effecting whether they end up being rich or poor, or follow their dreams or gives up on them. As such, there are sometimes two very different versions of characters, or conversely, characters who are only present in one world or another, due to dying or leaving the game's setting due to events happening in only one world. The development team conceded it was difficult for even them to keep track of all of the game's characters, with complications arising in keeping all the relationships and events straight across so many characters and two parallel dimensions.

=== Accent system ===
A vast majority of the 45 characters in the game possess their own unique accents and speech patterns. When lines were being recycled for a number of characters, instead of storing over 40 slightly different static variations of the same text and running into potential memory issues, the localization team adapted and expanded the Japanese version's auto-accent generator, to allow text to be converted into a dozen of variations that retain most of the features of the various characters. With this system, only one generic version had to be stored internally and shared by all characters. For example, the static text "How are you?" would be stored, but if spoken by an Australian character it would be changed to "How are ya?"; if spoken by an Alien character it would appear as "How aare yoou?" Translator Richard Honeywood would say in retrospect that while the converter helped deal with memory constraints, creating and working with it was described as "mind-boggling". The system did not work well with some more detailed scenes that required more context; these were treated as independent lines, retaining an original version of the dialogue for each character.

== Characters ==
=== Playable characters ===
The game contains a total of 45 playable characters. While some join automatically as the plot progresses, others only become playable depending on the actions of the player. For example, early in the game, the player is tasked with breaking Serge into a heavily guarded manor house. The player must explore the town outside of the manor in order to find assistance with breaking in. The player may choose to ask Guile, Pierre, or Nikki for help on different approaches to breaking into the manor. The player may only choose one, and only that respective character will join the party. At other times, characters will not join if other characters are present. Early in the game, Leena will only join if the player opts to have Serge traveling alone at the time; if Kid is already with him, she no longer feels the need to help, and will not join. As such, it is impossible for all characters to join over the course of a single game. However, the game employs a New Game + system, where, upon starting a second game, characters who had been recruited on the prior playthrough will become available towards the latter part of the game. As such, the player can retain characters from the first game, while taking alternate paths to recruit characters missed the first time.

The characters are presented in the order given in the game's master list of playable characters.

==== Serge ====
Serge (セルジュ, Seruju) is the silent protagonist of Chrono Cross; his motions alongside the reactions of other players indicate that Serge talks with others, but none of Serge's actual dialogue is shown outside of occasional dialogue trees. Instead, he is meant to be interpreted as "the persona of the player". Much of the game involves the player following Serge after he's been sucked into an alternative dimension where no one he previously knew recognizes him, and many are in his pursuit.

The game's events reveal that Serge had died years prior in the Alternate World. As a child, he had come in contact with the all-powerful "Frozen Flame", a remnant of the all-powerful Lavos creature from Chrono Trigger. Once Serge had made contact, it sealed off the ability for anyone else to gain access to its power. With Serge dead in the "Alternate World", the Serge alive in the Home World was now necessary in the Alternate World. Kid pulled him through the dimensions as part of Balthasar's lengthy plan to defeat the Time Devourer and free Schala from it. Meanwhile, Lynx needed his body in order to gain access to the Frozen Flame's power. While Lynx succeeds in this, resulting in the two switching bodies for a period of the game, leaving the player controlling Serge trapped in Lynx's body for the middle third of the game, if the player directs Serge to find the legendary "Chrono Cross" item and use it to fight the Time Devourer, Balthasar's plan also succeeds.

==== Lynx ====
Lynx (ヤマネコ, Yamaneko; "Wildcat") is an anthropomorphic feline that serves as one of the game's primary antagonists. Initially, he is seen as a character that is searching for Serge with the Acacia Dragoons, and loathed by Kid, both for then unknown reasons. For the middle portion of the game, Lynx switches bodies with Serge, where he is the primary playable character for a third of the game. It's eventually revealed that, due to a complicated series of events, Lynx is actually Serge's father, taken over by a supercomputer named FATE, that ultimately needed Serge's body to access the all-powerful Frozen Flame. In addition to this, Kid's hate stems from Lynx's past abduction of Lucca Ashtear, Kid's maternal figure from her orphanage, who had stood in the way of his goals.

Lynx does not have a particular speech pattern, and is silent when Serge is inhabiting his body. All of the game's events depict the "Alternate World" Lynx; the "Home World" Lynx is not ever seen. Kato, in the Ultimania guide, states that in the Home World, Lynx dies in the Dead Sea with Harle and the Acacia Dragoons.

==== Kid ====
Kid (キッド, Kiddo) is considered the second most important character of the game. Kid loathes Lynx for initially undisclosed reasons, and helps to defend Serge from Lynx's pursuit efforts against him. While they team up due to shared involvement with Lynx, various choices by the player and certain required plot points shorten or lengthen the time they work together. Late in the game, it is revealed that she is actually a cloned version of Schala from Chrono Trigger, who had fallen into an area beyond time and space following the events of the prior game. There, she was trapped and fused with Lavos, the antagonist of Chrono Trigger, but was still able to observe the rest of the world. Schala observed Serge about to drown as a child, created the storm that saved his life by directing him to the healing powers of the Frozen Flame, and then created a clone of herself to send back to reality to find Serge. The clone-baby, Kid, is found by Lucca, who raises her in her orphanage. Kid hates Lynx because he raided Lucca's orphanage, abducting Lucca and leaving Kid homeless, leaving her to fend for herself as a child on her own, leading to the brash exterior person she is for much of the course of the game. Kid is also the reason why there are two dimensions in the game; she traveled in time to save Serge from dying, splitting the world into two, one where Serge lives, and one where he had died.

She speaks with an Australian accent, as indicated by her use of several Australian slang terms such as bugger, bloke, and sheila. The Alternate World Kid is the one seen throughout the game;

==== Guile ====
Guile (アルフ, Arufu; Alf) is a traveling magician who makes a bet with a fortune-teller that he could break into Viper Manor. The player, who must break Serge into Viper Manor as well, may choose to work with Guile, leading him to join the party if selected. Early in the game's development, Guile was intended to be the character Magus from Chrono Trigger, who after the events of the first game, was traveling through time to find his lost sister, Schala. However, as development progressed, upon adding such a large cast of characters to the game, the development team felt that his story couldn't sufficiently be focused on, and he was switched into the Guile character. The developers still left some subtle references to Magus; including his Japanese name, Alf, resembling Magus's pet cat name, Alfador in Chrono Trigger, his English name, Guile, being similar to "Gil", the name for Magus in Radical Dreamers, and had quite similarities to Magus in his appearance and "floating" nature of movement.

Guile's speech often references topics such as "mystery" or "magic". He is only shown in the "Alternate World". While he does not appear in the "Home World", Sneff recognizes the "Alternate World" Guile as part of the "Magic Guild", suggesting he had seen the "Home World" Guile.

==== Norris ====
Norris (イシト, Ishito; Ishito) is the leader of the "Black Wind", an elite branch of the Porre Military. In the "Home World", they have overtaken the town of Termina, where General Viper and the Acacia Dragoons cease to exist, and as such, are unable to defend the town from them. He automatically joins the party to help Serge while trapped in Lynx's body, desiring to accompany him to the Dead Sea, and ends up stays with the group.

Norris doesn't speak with any special accent or habits, but generally speaks and acts very kindly towards people, sometimes unbefitting of a person who is a leader of a military group. In one of the game's endings, it is revealed that he is the "kind stranger" who delivered the antidote that cured Kid's life-threatening poison if the player chose to have Serge not save her. Norris is present in both the "Home World" and the "Alternate World", with him being largely the same in both worlds.

==== Nikki ====
Nikki (スラッシュ, Surasshu; Slash) is a guitarist in the "Magical Dreamers", a musical troupe of which the dancer Miki is also a member. He is the son of Fargo and his deceased wife, Zelbess, and a sibling to Marcy. In the "Alternate World", he joins the party if the player opts to have Serge work with him as one of the possible people to break into the Viper Manor. He is present in the "Home World" as well, where he is trying to cleanse the monster-infested island of Marbule.

Nikki's speech pattern finds him often referencing guitars or music in general. Several allusions to Slash, including his original Japanese name, and the song lyrics he sings, such as "Sweet Sister of Mine". He as a character is largely consistent, without any major differences, between the "Home" and "Alternate World".

==== Viper ====
General Viper (蛇骨大佐, Jakotsu Taisa; lit. Colonel Snakebone) is the lord of El Nido and leader of the Acacia Dragoons. He served as one of the four former Dragoon Devas, the highest rank of the Acacia Dragoons, until he retired and became the head of El Nido. He is also the father of Riddel. Over the course of the game, he aspires to acquire the powerful "Frozen Flame" to defend El Nido from the militaristic nation of Porre and create a peaceful world similar to the kingdom of Guardia. He automatically join's Serge party.

Viper has a formal and diplomatic speech pattern. While usually a confident father figure type, he has moments of uncertainty as well, referring to himself as ""just a fool chasing his own desires". Viper is only present in the "Alternate World"; in the "Home World", he and his men are persuaded by Lynx to visit the Dead Sea three years prior to the game, and all end up dead.

==== Riddel ====
Riddel (リデル, Rideru) is the daughter of General Viper and past fiancée to childhood friend Dario prior to his death in the "Alternate World". Riddel automatically joins Serge's party after being rescued by him from Porre soldiers. If the player opts to have Serge travel to the "Home World" with Riddel to an isolated island, they find that Dario is indeed alive in the "Home World". If the player has Serge fight and defeat Dario, Riddel decides to help him rebuild the destroyed Viper's Manor and make it an orphanage.

Riddel doesn't have a specific speech pattern, but commonly speaks as a kind and beautiful woman with a heavy heart. Riddel is only present in the "Alternate World", in the "Home World", she and the rest of the Acacia Dragoons die in the Dead Sea.

==== Karsh ====
Karsh (カーシュ, Kāshu) is one of the four Dragoon Devas. Initially, he is merely shown as a figure Lynx uses to track down Serge, though he later joins the party during Serge's body switch with Lynx. As a child, Karsh feels jealousy over Riddel's romantic feelings towards his friend Dario, and later regret for killing Dario, though its later revealed he killed Dario out a self-defense while he was possessed, not jealousy.

He is portrayed as rough but honorable. During development, a design of Karsh wearing full armor was rejected for not fitting the game's atmosphere. Karsh is only present in the "Alternate World", in the "Home World", he and the rest of the Acacia Dragoons die in the Dead Sea.

==== Zoah ====
Zoah (ゾア, Zoa) is one of the four Dragoon Devas. He constantly wears an iron helmet to cover his face due to a war injury. He rejects wealth and power and has chosen to dedicate his life to battle, although the fortune teller in Termina senses "deep sadness" beneath his helmet. During development, Zoah was meant to be "the prince of a certain country", watching over the protagonists' actions and wearing the helmet not due to an injury but to hide his true identity. However, because of time constraints, the event hinting at this was not implemented.

Zoah's dialogue is written in all capital letters to emulate his voice booming through the helmet. Zoah is only present in the "Alternate World", in the "Home World", he and the rest of the Acacia Dragoons die in the Dead Sea.

==== Marcy ====
Marcy (マルチェラ, Maruchera) is one of the four Dragoon Devas. Her appearance is of a human, though she is the daughter of Fargo, a human, and Zelbess, a demi-human, her ancestry something she struggles with internally. She largely grows up without her family - Zelbess dies right after her birth, and Fargo believed Marcy to have died as well - but lives with the assistance from the Dragoons and Luccia, a friend of Zelbess. Her original name during development was Rachel. Marcy's speech pattern sounds like an angry valley girl, often yelling at others while adding "like" through her fiery statements. Marcy is only present in the "Alternate World", in the "Home World", she and the rest of the Acacia Dragoons die in the Dead Sea.

==== Korcha ====
Korcha (コルチャ, Korucha) is a troublemaker in the town of Termina, but when Kid is poisoned, he is there to rescue her as she falls from a Viper Manor balcony. He becomes enamored with Kid, and helps Serge find the Hydra Humour needed to cure her.

==== Luccia ====
Luccia (ルチアナ, Ruchiana; Lutianna) is a scientist who conducts experiments in Viper Mansion. Her experiments create playable characters Pip and NioFio, while her brother created Grobyc. If the player chooses to have Serge speak to her late in the game, she joins the party, wanting to observe Serge's strength, and if the player has Kid speak with her reveals she was scientific colleagues with Lucca from Chrono Trigger. Luccia speaks with a German accent. She is only present in the "Alternate World"; the Viper Manor she resides in is destroyed in the "Home World".

==== Poshul ====
Poshul (ポシュル, Poshuru) is a pink dog belonging to Leena. She speaks with a lisp, a stutter, many exclamations, and commonly using "I" and "me" interchangeably. Poshul is identical in both the "Home World" and "Alternate World", and the only character that can have either version of the character join the party, merely requiring the player to have Serge give her a bone.

==== Razzly ====
Razzly (ラズリー, Razurī) is a fairy from Water Dragon Isle. If the player opts to have Serge help find a cure for Kid's poison, it leads him to the Hydra Marshes, where Razzly is imprisoned and surrounded by a deadly monster. If the player has Serge intervene to save her, she joins the party; if the player does not save her, or decides against assisting Kid altogether, Razzly is never seen again, with only her mangled cage remaining. When Razzly speaks, she replaces the words "fairly" and "very" with the word "fairy". Razzly is only present in the "Home World"; in the "Alternate World", her events occur because the Water Dragon Isle is dried up and abandoned, and the Hydra Marshes are poisoned.

==== Zappa ====
Zappa (ザッパ) is a blacksmith from the town of Termina, and had been one of the four Devas of the Acacia Dragoons prior to the events of the game. He is the husband of Zippa, and father of Karsh, who has succeeded him as one of General Viper's 4 Dragoon Devas. Zappa has a Scottish accent. He is present in both the "Home World" and "Alternate World", though very different in each one. In the "Alternate World", he is seen as a thriving blacksmith, providing equipment to the Acacia Dragoons. However, in the "Home World", his business struggles and has to shut it down, due to the Acacia Dragoons being completely wiped out and because of the Porre military restricting his business. Additionally, in the "Home World", he is saddened because Karsh has been missing for the last three years. As such, if the player has Serge talk with Zappa in the "Home World", he will join the party, in order to search the world for Karsh and improve his craft.

==== Orcha ====
Orcha (オーチャ, Ōcha) is the cook at Viper Manor. The Porre Military made him ingest Quaffid seeds, and then transformed him into the Hell's Cook to have him torture Riddel, but he is defeated by Serge, when he arrives in Lynx's body. He reverts to normal, and joins forces with Serge. Similar to Korcha, Macha, and Mel, Orcha commonly substitutes "cha" in for you, for instance, saying "Dontcha?" in place of "Don't you?". Despite his similar name and speaking patterns, none of their interactions indicate Orcha even knowing the rest of them.

==== Radius ====
Radius (ラディウス, Radiusu) is a skilled, knowledgeable, and retired warrior. Prior to his retirement, he served as one of the Dragoon Devas, where he and his friend Garai eventually found the cursed Masamune sword. This resulted in Radius assassinating Garai in a fit of jealousy partly induced by the cursed sword. Radius discarded the sword and kept the cause of death to himself, retiring from fighting to look after Garai's sons, Dario and Glenn, until Dario became a Dragoon Deva.

Radius's speech often references his old age or other's comparative younger age, and is accompanied by an old man's laugh. In the Home World, Radius becomes the village chief of Serge's hometown - Arni, while in the Alternate World, Radius left the world's affairs entirely to live as a hermit.

==== Fargo ====
Fargo (ファルガ, Faruga; Farga) is the captain of the S.S. Zelbess and Nikki and Marcy's father. In Another World, he captains a pirate ship, the S.S. Invincible. Serge stumbles across the ship in the fog south of Hermit's Hideaway and, once aboard, is challenged by Fargo to various tests of strength. In Home World, Fargo is the captain of a cruise ship, the S.S. Zelbess, and is a cheater in his own casino. Fargo exudes a very "macho" persona, and occasionally speaks with pirate dialog. Formerly a Dragoon Deva along with Radius, Garai, and Zappa.

==== Macha ====
Macha (ママチャ, Mamacha; Mamacha) is the mother of Korcha and Mel residing in Guldove. If the player chooses to have Serge not help Kid when poisoned, Korcha refuses to join the party and Macha joins instead. Like her children, she commonly subs in "cha" for "you" in her sentence, saying "dontcha" in place of "don't you".

==== Glenn ====
Glenn (グレン, Guren) is a member of the Acacia Dragoons. Glenn was created by the developers to represent a unique situation in JRPGs - a "zealous hero" type who was not actually the main character or central focus of the story. He bears the same name as the character nicknamed Frog from Chrono Trigger, but has no apparent connection to him. Originally considered a naughty child, after the death of his father Garai and brother Dario, he matures, becomes popular among the townsfolk, and joins the military. He doesn't have a specific speech pattern, but often speaks showing that he follows his own moral sense and is even willing to break military regulations if deemed necessary, being one of the few who is suspicious of Lynx early in the game. Glenn is only present in the "Alternate World", in the "Home World", he and the rest of the Acacia Dragoons die in the Dead Sea.

==== Leena ====
Leena (レナ, Rena) is the close childhood friend of Serge who lives in the town of Arni. While no romantic relationship between her and Serge is ever explicitly stated, she does ask him for jewelry, refers to long-term promises made between them in the past, and asks about the prospect of them kissing one another. While typically being a sweet, girl next door type around Serge, her brother Una claims she is prone to temper tantrums and not being very "lady-like".

The only difference between the "Home World" and the "Alternate World" Leena is her relationship with Serge; Home World Leena has had a close relationship with Serge her whole life, while the other doesn't even recognize Serge, not having seen him for ten years due to his death occurring in that world. It is actually Alternate World Leena who follows Serge for much of the game; the Home World Leena only initiates the search for jewelry that set the events of the entire game in motion, otherwise staying behind. The Alternate World Leena joins Serge if the player chooses to reject Kid's first offer to travel with Serge early in the game, Leena not chasing after him if another girl is with him already.

==== Miki ====
Miki (ミキ) is a famous dancer known throughout El Nido. In the Alternate World, she is on tour with Nikki, while in the Home World, she is a performer aboard the S.S. Zelbess cruise ship. She joins the party if the player chooses to have Serge assist Miki and Nikki in saving the monster-overrun island of Marbule.

==== Harle ====
Harle (ツクヨミ, Tsukuyomi) is a harlequin jester. Harle works with Lynx against Serge and his party, as a gadfly who interferes with their efforts and frustrates Kid due to her constant flirting with Serge. She joins the party during Serge's body switch with Lynx, and leaves just before Serge returns to his body. It's eventually revealed that she was the "Dark Moon Dragon", actually working against Lynx to obtain the powerful Frozen Flame to exact havoc against humanity damaging activities to the planet. She fails in her mission, and her ultimate fate is left unclear. The game mentions, and Kato confirms in the game's Ultimania Guide, that Harle also shares a connection of sorts to Schala, though neither source explores the details of this.

Harle's speech is written with a French accent and is often interspersed with French words. Only one version of Harle, the "Alternate World" Harle, is present in the game.

==== Janice ====
Janice (ジャネス, Janesu; Jyaness) is a female human and rabbit hybrid aboard the S.S. Zelbess. If the player chooses to have Serge participate in the monster battling tournament, and defeat her three times, she joins the party.

==== Draggy ====
Draggy (龍の子, Ryū no Ko; lit. "Dragon Child") is a baby dragon. If the player chooses to have Serge hatch the egg from Fossil Valley in the incubator at Ft. Dragonia in the Home World, Draggy emerges from the egg and joins the party. As such, his dialogue mimics a child's speech pattern, for example, replacing an "r" with a "w" to refer to himself as a "Dwagon".

==== Starky ====
Starky (星の子, Hoshi no Ko; lit. "Star Child") initially appears as "Mega-Starky", a huge alien, that Serge must fight when arriving on Home World Sky Dragon Isle in the Home World. Once defeated, he shrinks down to normal size. Starky's main goal is to collect "Star Fragments", which he explains to be broken parts of his spaceship that shattered upon contact with the planet. He joins the party to collect all of the Star Fragments, but upon traveling to Another World, he discovers the spaceship completely intact in that dimension. From the spaceship he retrieves an anti-gravity device allows the party to reach Terra Tower in the sky, which had been otherwise unreachable.

==== Sprigg ====
Sprigg (スプリガン, Supurigan; Spriggan) is a resident of the Dimensional Vortex, where Serge is sent after trading bodies with Lynx. She helps him escape back to reality, and automatically joins the party. Sprigg's unique ability is "Doppelgang", which allows her to transform into certain monsters defeated by her.

==== Mojo ====
Mojo (ラッキーダン, Rakkī Dan; Lucky Dan) is a human-sized voodoo doll purchased by a resident of Serge's hometown, Arni Village. If the player chooses to have Serge interact with it, it gains sentience and the ability to move, and joins Serge's party. While initially distraught upon learning that voodoo dolls are used to inflict pain upon others, he decides to use his newfound self-awareness to help spread happiness to others instead, taking on the new name Mojoy (ハッピーダン, Happī Dan; Happy Dan), a play on "more joy". His speech pattern commonly adds an extraneous "-om" suffix to words. He is only present in the Alternate World; he is never purchased by Arni resident in the Home World.

==== Turnip ====
Turnip (カブ夫, Kabuo; lit. Male Turnip) is first discovered growing in the ground outside of the Hermit's Hideaway after if the player chooses to cool the ground in the area. Upon freeing him, he joins the party. His speech patter adds an extraneous "-eth" suffix to various words he says.

==== NeoFio ====
NeoFio (改良種フィオ, Kairyōshu Fio; lit. Improved Breed Fio) is a half plant, half human hybrid created as a result of one of Luccia's experiments. It is created and joins the party if the player chooses to have Serge follow Luccia's request to retrieve a "Life Sparkle". NeoFio speaks normally except for substituting a "ph" for every "f" in all words, a play on pH having such importance in soil pH and plants, and that "f" and "ph" phonetically make the same sound. She does not exist in the "Home World", where Luccia, her creator, is not present due to Viper Manor's destruction.

==== Greco ====
Greco (ジルベルト, Jiruberuto; Gilberto) is a former luchador wrestler who performs funeral services on the outskirts of Termina. The death of his best friend in an accident caused him to stop wrestling. If the player has Serge talk to him after one of his services, he joins the party. Elements of the Spanish language are mixed in with his dialogue. Greco is only present in the "Alternate World", although the ghost of Ghetz does show up and recognize Greco, suggesting Greco existing there as well. Greco was based on an actual real-life lucha libre wrestler and a catholic priest that goes by the stage name Fray Tormenta, the lucha mask Greco wears heavily resembles Fray Tormenta's original design (but the main color is different, to avoid possible legal issues).

==== Skelly ====
Skelly (スカール, Sukāru; Skull) is a skeleton clown whose bones are scattered around the El Nido archipelago. His origins trace back to a boy who ran off to join the circus, but eventually died while working there. If the player opts to have Serge locate his five main bones, and has him talk to his grandmother, he will join Serge's party.

==== Funguy ====
Funguy (キノコ, Kinoko; lit. Mushroom) is the father of Leena's friend Lisa, who runs the element shop in Termina. While initially a normal human, if the player chooses to have Serge feed him the "strange mushroom" item, it turns him into a mushroom-like humanoid creature. Blaming Serge for his condition, he joins the party in hopes of finding a cure. A cure is never found, but Funguy comes to terms with his new appearance, and decides to live his life in the forest by the end of the events of the game. His counterpart in the Home world, falls mysteriously ill around the time Funguy transformed.

==== Irenes ====
Irenes (イレーネス, Irēnesu) is a mermaid from the town of Marbule. However, she, and the rest of the demi-human citizens of the town, are driven out by monsters and forced to hard work on Fargo's cruise ship. She yearns to return her people to their land, and joins the party if the player chooses to have Serge help restore the town so they can return home. Irenes's speech pattern involves her vowels having umlauts. She is only present in the "Home World"; as the Marbule conflict does not occur in the Alternate World, she never appears.

==== Mel ====
Mel (メル, Meru) is Korcha's adopted little sister, and she is known for doodling with her crayons and having little to do with anyone around her. When Kid recovers from her poisoning at the hands of Lynx, Mel steals her elements during the night, but leaves behind evidence indicating that she is the thief. Korcha outsmarts Mel, and with Serge's help, surrounds her, and she is forced to return Kid's elements to her.

==== Leah ====
Leah (リーア, Rīa) is an orphan child living on the isolated island known as Gaea's Navel. She is the daughter of an unnamed warrior who disappeared "to the sky" when she was very young. She helps Serge find the Green Dragon, and joins the party upon defeating him, desiring to travel the world to help her decide if she wants return to her village or not, and to see if she can find out what happened to her father.

Leah's appearance and speech is similar to Ayla from Chrono Trigger, such as the tendency to add the suffix -um to some words in her speech, or using the phrase "Oooga Booga". Upon the end of the game, Leah states that she will name her daughter Ayla as well. She is only portrayed in the "Home World". Riding a creature called a "Wingapede" from the Hydra Marshes is the only method to travel to Gaea's Navel.

==== Van ====
Van (バンクリフ, Bankurifu; Vancliff) is a child living with his father, Gogh, in the town of Termina; their names referencing the Vincent van Gogh in the real world. Van is never happy with his father, though the reasons vary between the two worlds. In the "Home World", Gogh follows his dreams and becomes a painter, which leaves Van living in poverty and in fear of eviction, while in the "Alternate World", Gogh gives up his passion in favor of the more lucrative business trading of paintings, leaving Van living more comfortably, but feeling neglected due to Gogh's focus on career. If the player directs Serge to Van, he joins up, hoping Serge's adventure will lead him to solutions to his issues. Van does not have a particular speech pattern, but commonly references aspect of painting or art in his dialogue.

==== Sneff ====
Sneff (スネフ, Sunefu) is a performance magician indentured to Fargo in the Home World, due to his gambling debt to the captain. However, this is due to a rigged setup that causes Fargo to win every time. Upon Serge removing a part from Fargo's cheating device, rendering it inoperable, Sneff is able to earn back his freedom, and proceeds to join the party. Sneff is missing his front teeth, and thus is unable to pronounce some sounds. He pronounces "three" as "free" and "teeth" as "teeff."

==== Steena ====
Steena (スティーナ, Sutīna) is a shaman from Guldove. She assists Serge in finding the "Chrono Cross", and recovering his former body back after it was switched with Lynx's. She is known to guard the Dragon Tear in Guldove. Steena commonly speaks of prophecies, ancient lore, and spirituality in her dialogue. She is present in both the "Home World" and "Alternate World" as primarily the same person. In the "Alternate World", she still works under her elder shaman, Direa, where as in the "Home World", Direa has died, so Steena works by herself.

==== Doc ====
Doc (ドク, Doku) is the doctor of the island village of Guldove. When Kid is poisoned by Lynx's dagger, he feels remorse for being unable to provide the cure. If the player chooses not to have Serge help Kid, Doc joins the party, in hopes of broadening his world view and knowledge. Doc speaks in surfer lingo. He is present in both the "Home World" and "Alternate World", largely having the same characteristics.

==== Grobyc ====
Grobyc (ギャダラン, Gyadaran; Gyadrun) is a cyborg, and nicknamed "Killing Machine", from the Porre Military. Cold and calculating, he only answers to anyone who is stronger than himself. As such, Grobyc joins Serge's party automatically, after Serge defeats both himself, and another cyborg, Guillot, while rescuing Riddell from Viper Manor. Grobyc spelled backwards is "cyborg". He refers to himself in the third person, and his dialogue substitutes all spaces between words with dashes, simulating a rigid and mechanical speech pattern. Kotaku named Grobyc one of the "Most Insane Cyborgs In Japanese Video Games" in 2013.

==== Pierre ====
Pierre (ピエール, Piēru) is a vain, conceited swordsman living in the city of Termina, who values "beauty" over work ethic. He refers to himself as a great hero, yet is merely living in a rented room of Zappa's and unable to even pay rent on time. He moved to Termina because he aspires to go to Viper Manor to meet with General Viper about being part of the "Acacia Dragoons", of which are the highest level of knights. However, he fears he won't be let in without his "Hero's Medal". Pierre is only part of the story if the player opts to have Serge use his assistance to break into Viper Manor, which involves the player locating the "Hero's Medal". Pierre's approach to breaking into the Viper Manor is merely storming the front gates, which, despite many resulting battles, does work. However, later skirmishes between Kid and Lynx, and the eventual stabbing of General Viper, prevents any of Pierre's personal goals from progressing.

Pierre speaks with a French accent, though very amateurishly, and speaks in a condescending manner. He is only depicted in the "Alternate World"; he is not seen in the "Home World", where there is no opening in the "Acacia Dragoons", which have been entirely wiped out.

==== Orlha ====
Orlha (オルハ, Oruha) is a resident and bartender on the island village of Guldove. She first appears in the game as the person who convinces the Doctor not to give up on saving Kid from being poisoned. Later in the game, she is seen as a protector of the island as well, defending it when the Porre invades. Serge, stuck in Lynx's body, appears to be with the Porre military, and is forced into fighting her. After the battle, Serge is able to convince the Porre soldiers to leave, saving Orlha and Guldove. Orlha, grateful but unable to trust him in his Lynx/Porre form, gives him a brooch. If the player chooses to have Serge bring the brooch to Orlha once he's back in his original body, Orlha joins the party.

Orlha is only shown to exist in the "Alternate World". Rather than another version of herself, she has a twin sister, Tia, who only exists in the "Home World". Orlha had been searching for her her whole life, but only finds her if she joins Serge's party and travels to the other world. She finds Tia dying, and is unable to save her, but Tia's spirit inhabits the blue brooch Serge returns to her, traveling with Orlha and even helping her attack in battle. Orlha doesn't follow a particular speech pattern, but is often shown as a "voice of reason" in serious times, and a rowdy tom boy in battle situations.

==== Pip ====
Pip (ツマル, Tsumaru; lit. Packed) is a cute like creature that Luccia has experimented on in her laboratory. If player chooses to have Serge unlock his cage, he can later be recruited aboard the S.S. Invincible. Pip is unique, being the only character that goes through transformations depending on how the player uses him in battle. Depending on what elements are used when fighting, he may transform into lighter or darker versions of himself, with different attacks and appearances.

Pip's speaking pattern involves substituting many "l" and "r" sounds with a "w", and using "de" in place of "the". He is only shown to exist in the "Another World"; in the "Home World", the lab he was experimented on, in Viper Manor, was destroyed.

=== Chrono Trigger characters ===
A number of the major characters of Chrono Trigger play roles in Chrono Cross as well, although much of the time they are relegated to the game's backstory rather than actively participating in the events of the game. Crono, Marle, and Lucca, three of the main playable characters from Chrono Trigger, appear in Chrono Cross, but they are neither playable nor major characters. Instead, they are presented as childlike apparitions that appear at key points in the game to inform Serge of key aspects of the game's backstory. While their homeland of Guardia was aggressively overthrown by the neighboring war nation Porre, their ultimate fate is not disclosed in Chrono Cross, leaving it unclear if they are meant to be literally deceased ghost figures, or alive and transposing their likeness through other methods. Additionally, the game explains that many Lucca's actions between Trigger and Cross directly influence the scenarios for both Kid and Lynx. Robo, while not directly present in the game, is meant to be the "Prometheus Circuit" referenced in the game.

Belthasar, "Guru of Reason" in the ancient Kingdom of Zeal in Chrono Trigger, returns as the ultimate mastermind behind much of the events of Chrono Cross. His elaborate plan, resulting in much of the events and backstory of the game, was all engineered by him in order to enable Serge to defeat the Time Devourer and save Schala.

=== Non-playable antagonists ===
==== Devourer of Time ====
The Devourer of Time (時を喰らうもの, Toki o Kurau Mono) is the creature resulting from Lavos absorbing Schala. Lavos returns as the main villain, but does not appear until the end. By accident during Chrono Trigger, Schala was banished to the darkness of time, where later, the remnants of the defeated Lavos arrived and began absorbing the former princess of Zeal to create a new being. The resulting life-form — the Time Devourer — would have been capable of devouring all spacetime once matured. Though unknown to Serge for most of his quest, the entire events concerning the dimensions and the creation of El Nido were set in motion to empower him to defeat the Time Devourer and free Schala. Using the Chrono Cross, he accomplished this mission. In DS port of Chrono Trigger, the Devourer of Time is shown in a less advanced stage of its evolution, named the Dream Devourer.

==== Dragon God ====
The Dragon God (龍神, Ryūjin) was a biological plasma machine created by the Dragonian race that existed in an alternate universe, where the Reptites survived and became the dominant race on Earth. When the city Dinopolis was sucked into the same dimension as Chronopolis, a battle ensued. In the end, the Dragonians lost the war, their city sunk into the sea, and the Dragon God itself was splintered into six beings, which became the Dragon gods that were sealed over the islands. Some like the Sky Dragon and the Water Dragon were worshiped as deities while others receded into hiding. They used Serge and his party to destroy FATE so they could break the seal and become one again. They created Harle to ensure it, though she was reluctant. However, it was revealed that the Dragon God was absorbed by the Time Devourer long ago during its separation.

==== FATE ====
FATE (フェイト, Feito) is a supercomputer created by Belthasar in the distant future. It was constructed from Mother Brain, a super computer in the apocalyptic future of 2300 AD outlined in the plot of Chrono Trigger. FATE is self-aware and can act alone. An event called the "Time Crash" ends up sending it back in time, where it operates as a mechanism that subconsciously directs and brainwashes humans from performing any actions that could cause a paradox that would harm its existence. FATE operates as an unseen villain until late in the game, where it reveals its goal was to reincarnate itself into a new, real, living species. However, it is defeated by Serge and his party.

==== The Shaker Brothers ====
The Shaker Brothers, Solt and Peppor, main purpose is to act as a tutorial for the player, often showing what not to do in the game's battle system. They tag along with the Acacia Dragoons and reside in the Viper Manor. If the player chooses to have Serge work with Pierre to get into Viper Manner, a third character, Ketchop, is also introduced. Their names are all related to condiments: salt and pepper shakers and ketchup. Solt speaks in a redundant manner, using phrases like "painfully painful" and "obviously obvious", where Peppor excessively uses the word "shake", in phrases like "Let's shake it to them!" or "Let's shake it out of here!" Ketchop's only words are shouted references to sauces, like "Tomato!".

The Shaker Brothers are primarily present in the "Alternate World", however, they do appear in a vastly different situation in the "Home World". While the two are not killed when the Acacia Dragoons were eliminated and the Viper Mansion was destroyed, the two resort to wandering the world aimlessly with amnesia. Sneff takes them in as part of his traveling magic show aboard the S.S. Zelbess, albeit as struggling comedians.

== Reception ==
While Chrono Cross on a whole generally received very positive reviews, including some publications, like GameSpot, giving it a perfect score, critics were divided on how Squaresoft handled the game's cast. David Zdyrko of IGN strongly praised the game's character accent system, stating he was impressed that "Square was able to give each of the game's 40-plus playable characters different characteristics and, in many cases, distinct accents and speech patterns. The accents were handled surprisingly well and most were pretty consistent throughout the entire game." Zdyrko felt that the accent system helped validate the choice to make the cast so big, concluding that the accents "...combined with the fact that each of the characters in the game plays an important role in the plot of the story help brings them to life as individuals. The character development isn't the best you'll find in an RPG, but it's better than most." GameSpot's Andrew Vestral similarly praised the cast, stating, "Surprisingly, Chrono Cross seemingly endless supply of characters works to its benefit, not its detriment...Every last one of the 40-plus members is a unique, story-driven, and valuable contributor. Unlike many cast-of-thousands RPG epics, each character in Chrono Cross is an interesting and worthy addition to your team. Everyone has a beautiful character model, excellently animated attacks, and three unique "limit break" type special skills. There's even a miniquest or special requirement for every character's best skill...you'll never add someone to your party and wonder, "Why is this character in the game?" There are no disposable placeholders in Chrono Cross." Vestral did concede that much of the Chrono Trigger fan-base disapproved of the concept of 40+ characters prior to release, but he argued the way the game handled should dispel any such concerns. Johnny Liu of Game Revolution also acknowledged the concerns with the large cast as well, but felt that players would see more value in the characters once their respective dedicated sidequests were played. The staff review at RPGFan also praised the cast, not only for its size and character development, but for the unique scenario of allowing the player to recruit some characters, and then have them interact with alternate versions of themselves due to the game's alternate dimension scenario. Similarly, in a Kotaku retrospective on the game by Peter Tieryas, he stated that he initially "didn’t feel the characters were as rich or interesting as the ones in Chrono Trigger", he grew more positive of the cast upon realizing that "Cross wasn’t trying to recreate the closer, more intimate adventure of Trigger. Cross was about a huge cast of characters and the implications of their existence, how one death, or life, impacts the universe around them."

Some reviewers were less enthusiastic in regards to the game's cast of characters. USGamer's Jeremy Parish, in his Chrono Cross retrospective, felt that the creators were needlessly harsh in their treatment and uncertain fates of returning Chrono Trigger characters, a sentiment also echoed by Tieryas. Furthermore, Parish criticized the size and quality of the cast, comparing it to a failed attempt to mimic Pokémon or Suikoden's large casts. He concluded that too many of the characters didn't impact the game enough, stating, "The characters are the definition of slight – most of them have little personality outside of a hokey accent – but the core cast has purpose, while everyone else is there in case you want to have a giant voodoo doll, mushroom man, or baby alien in your party for some reason. Simon Seamann of RPGamer also criticized the difficulty in switching characters and transferring equipment between them, which he felt discouraged players from experiencing the full-breadth of the varied cast. Lack of character development outside of the core, required cast of characters was also cited as a problem.

Leigh Alexander, in a separate retrospective from Kotaku, had a different interpretation of the cast altogether, claiming that while some characters weren't important or interesting, in a way, that was the point, and that still helped the overall narrative. She stated "Chrono Cross is special. That it contains so many disparate and seemingly-random recruitable party members – though a few are key to the story – seems to be considered by gamers to be a weakness of the game, but narratively it's effective, enhancing the player's empathy for Serge's isolation. Each person has his or her own goals; the game contains no grand messages on love and friendship and unity. It isn't particularly directed, either, with rewards sometimes to be found for simply exploring areas on one's own. It's easy to forget one's objective, to feel lost. The result is the game feels like an essay on self-discovery, a process that is inherently lonely and often sad."

GamesRadar particularly singled out the body-switching event between Serge and Lynx as one of their "Gaming's Most Satisfying Character Switches", with David Roberts praising the game in how it handled how differently characters interact with the player depending on the body being controlled at the time. The switch and its after-effects were also singled out by Tieryas as a standout moment, praising how the change in perspective shook up the game flow with Serge having to deal with the aftermath of Lynx's harsh prior actions to people, favorably comparing it to the film Face/Off. Other journalists found Kid to be more of a standout character. Trent Steely of RPGamer selected her as his pick for outstanding female character in RPGs, stating that "Kid deserves to be appreciated for her innate attributes. She truly cares for those around her, in spite of her rough edge and disdain towards authority. She also exhibits great strength and often pushes people to do the right thing. It's for those reasons why Kid deserves to be recognized as one of the better female RPG characters of our time. Jeremy Peeples of Hardcore Gamer deemed her his favorite character out of the 45 person cast, praising the stark contrast between her pleasant exterior and her difficult past of growing up homeless and living a difficult life, comparing her similarly to Aerith from Final Fantasy VII as being a character that the player would bond with and be disappointed when story events take her out of the player's party.
