= Orcha =

Orcha may refer to:

- Orcha (Chrono Cross), a character in the PlayStation game Chrono Cross
- Orsha, a city in Belarus
- Orchha, a town in Madhya Pradesh, India, formerly the capital of Orchha State
- Orchha State, a princely state of Bundelkhand, Madhya Pradesh, India
