= Miserere =

Miserere (Latin imperative of misereor 'have mercy' or 'have pity') may refer to:

- Psalm 51, referred to as "Miserere" because of its opening words, "Miserere mei, Deus"

== Music ==
=== Classical compositions ===
- Musical settings of Psalm 51, the "Miserere", include:
  - Miserere (Josquin), c. 1503 motet setting by Josquin des Prez
  - Miserere nostri, 1575 composition by Thomas Tallis
  - Miserere (Allegri), 1630s musical setting by Gregorio Allegri
  - Miserere mei Deus (LWV 25),1664 grand motet by Jean-Baptiste Lully
  - Miserere des Jésuites H.193 (1683-85), Miserere H.157 (1670), Miserere H.173 (late 1670s), Miserere H.219 (early 1690s ?), by Marc-Antoine Charpentier
  - Miserere S 27 by Michel-Richard de Lalande
  - Miserere by Louis-Nicolas Clérambault
  - Miserere by Charles-Hubert Gervais
  - Miserere (1726), by André Campra
  - Miserere, 1735 motet by French composer Joseph Michel
  - Miserere, (K. 85) 1770 motet by Wolfgang Amadeus Mozart
  - Miserere in B flat minor, 1809 by E. T. A. Hoffmann
  - "Miserere", from the 1853 opera Il Trovatore by Giuseppe Verdi
  - Miserere (Górecki), 1981 work by Henryk Górecki
  - Miserere (Pärt), 1989/1992 work by Arvo Pärt
  - Miserere, 2009 by James MacMillan

=== Albums and popular songs ===
- Miserere (album), by Zucchero, 1992, and its title song
- Miserere, an album by Bruno Pelletier, 1997
- "Miserere", a song by the Cat Empire from the 2005 album Two Shoes
- "Miserere", a song by Katherine Jenkins from the 2004 album Première
- "Miserere Mei", a song by Myriads from the 2002 album Introspection
- "Miserere", a song from the soundtrack of the 1986 film The Mission, by Ennio Morricone

== Other uses ==
- "Miserere seat" or Misericord, a foldable seat used to support prayer.
- Miserere (novel), a 2008 novel by Jean-Christophe Grangé
- The Mark of the Angels – Miserere, a 2013 French thriller film based on the novel
- Miserere, a 1948 suite of lithographs by Georges Rouault
- Plaza Miserere, a plaza in Buenos Aires, Argentina

== See also ==
- Kyrie (disambiguation)
