= Kirie =

Kirie can refer to:

== Fictional characters ==
Name

- Kirie (Japanese: キリエ), a character from the Ai no Kusabi Japanese novel
- Kirie (Japanese: キリエ), a character from the Angel Sanctuary Japanese manga
- Kirie Fujou (Japanese: 巫条 霧絵), a character from the Japanese animated film The Garden of Sinners
- Kirie Goshima (Japanese: 五島 桐絵), a character from the Uzumaki manga
- Kirie Himuro (Japanese: 氷室 霧絵), a character from the Fatal Frame video game series
- Kirie Kanoe (Japanese: 庚 霧江), a character from the Dusk Maiden of Amnesia manga
- Kirie Kojima (Japanese: 小島 桐絵), a character from the Girls Bravo manga
- Kirie Konami (Japanese: 小南 桐絵), a character from the World Trigger manga
- Kirie Motoba (Japanese: 本場 切絵), a character from the Himouto! Umaru-chan manga
- Kirië Sakurame (Japanese: 桜雨キリヱ), a character from the UQ Holder! manga
- Kirië Tsuchiya (Japanese: 土屋 キリエ), a character from the Spiral: The Bonds of Reasoning manga

Surname

- Yōsuke Kirie (Japanese: 切江 洋介), a character from the Bokurano manga

== Arts ==
- Kirie (art) (also kiri-e; Japanese: 切り絵), the Japanese art of papercutting
- Kirigami (also kirigami; Japanese: 切り紙), a variation of origami which includes papercutting

== Other uses ==
- Kirie, a magic system in the role-playing game Deep Labyrinth

== See also ==
- Kyrie (disambiguation)
