= Kaari (disambiguation) =

Kaari may refer to:

- Catfish, also known as Kaari, diverse group of ray-finned fish
- Kaari Utrio (born 1942), proper surname Utrio-Linnilä, Finnish writer
- Malaiyamaan Kaari, one of the kings of the Tamil royal house clan Velir of the Malaiyamān dynasty

== See also ==
- Rosaappo Ravikkai Kaari, 1979 Tamil language film
- Karri (disambiguation)
