= Kyrie (disambiguation) =

Kyrie, also called Kyrie eleison, is the common name of an important prayer of Christian liturgy.

Kyrie may also refer to:

== Music ==
- Kyrie (Vivaldi), a composition by Antonio Vivaldi
- Kyrie in F major, K. 33, a composition by Wolfgang Amadeus Mozart
- Kyrie in D minor, K. 341, a composition by Wolfgang Amadeus Mozart
- Kyrie (album), an album by Mina
- "Kyrie" (song), a song by Mr. Mister
- "Kyrie", a song by Kalafina
- "Kyrie", a song by Sheck Wes

== Other uses ==
- Kyrie (given name), a given name (and list of people and fictional characters with the name)
- Kyrie (film), a 2023 film directed by Shunji Iwai
- "Kyrie", a 1969 science fiction story by Poul Anderson
- Kyrie, a fictional race in HeroScape

== See also ==
- Kairi (disambiguation)
- Karie (disambiguation)
- Kirie (disambiguation)
- "Kyrie Eleison" (song), a song by the Electric Prunes
- "Kyrie Eleison", a song by Fates Warning on their 1985 album The Spectre Within
- “The Donor,” a song by Judee Sill with the phrase “Kyrie Eleison” chanted repeatedly in the chorus
