= Kairi =

Kairi may originally refer to:

== Places ==
- Trinidad, an island formerly known as Kairi
- Kairi, Queensland, a town in Far North Queensland, Australia
- Kairi Ka Igamba, Kenya

== People ==
- Kairi (name)
- Kairi (gamer), Filipino professional Mobile Legends: Bang Bang player
- Kairi, former member of K-pop boy group TFN (formerly T1419).

== Fictional characters ==
- Kairi (Kingdom Hearts), a character from Kingdom Hearts
- Kairi, a character from Nightmare Inspector: Yumekui Kenbun
- Kairi (Street Fighter), a character from Street Fighter
- Kairi Imahara, a character from Apex Legends
- Kairi Sanjo, a character from Shugo Chara!
- Kairi Tanaga, a character from Batman: The Animated Series and Batman Beyond
- Kairi Yano, a character from Kaitou Sentai Lupinranger VS Keisatsu Sentai Patranger

== Other uses ==
- Kairi language, another name for the Rumu language in Papua New Guinea
- Kairi, an Indian term for unripe green mangoes
- Kairi – Rishta Khatta Meetha, an Indian TV series

== See also ==
- Karri (disambiguation)
- Kyrie (disambiguation)
