= Chrono Cross =

1999 video game

- North American box art
- Developer: Square (Note: Developed by Product Development Division 3. The Radical Dreamers Edition co-developed by Square Enix and D4 Enterprise.)
- Publishers: PlayStation: JP: Square; NA: Square Electronic Arts; The Radical Dreamers Edition: WW: Square Enix
- Director: Masato Kato
- Producer: Hiromichi Tanaka
- Designer: Hiromichi Tanaka
- Programmer: Kiyoshi Yoshii
- Artists: Yasuyuki Honne; Nobuteru Yūki
- Writer: Masato Kato
- Composer: Yasunori Mitsuda
- Series: Chrono
- Platforms: PlayStation; Nintendo Switch; PlayStation 4; Windows; Xbox One
- Release: PlayStation: JP: November 18, 1999; NA: August 15, 2000; Nintendo Switch, PlayStation 4, Windows, Xbox One: WW: April 7, 2022
- Genre: Role-playing
- Mode: Single-player

Chrono Cross (Note: Japanese: クロノ・クロス, Hepburn: Kurono Kurosu) is a 1999 role-playing video game developed and published by Square for the PlayStation video game console. It is set in the same world as Chrono Trigger, which was released in 1995 for the Super Nintendo Entertainment System. Chrono Cross was designed primarily by scenarist and director Masato Kato, who had help from other designers who also worked on Chrono Trigger, including art director Yasuyuki Honne and composer Yasunori Mitsuda. Nobuteru Yūki designed the characters of the game.

The story of Chrono Cross focuses on a teenage boy named Serge and a theme of parallel worlds. Faced with an alternate reality in which he died as a child, Serge endeavors to discover the truth of the two worlds' divergence. The flashy thief Kid and many other characters assist him in his travels around the tropical archipelago El Nido. Struggling to uncover his past and find the mysterious Frozen Flame, Serge is chiefly challenged by Lynx, a shadowy antagonist working to apprehend him.

Upon its release in Japan in 1999 and North America in 2000, Chrono Cross received widespread acclaim, earning a perfect 10.0 score from GameSpot. The game shipped 1.5 million copies worldwide by 2003, leading to a Greatest Hits re-release and continued life in Japan as part of the Ultimate Hits series. Chrono Cross was later re-released for the PlayStation Network in Japan in July 2011, and in North America four months later. A remaster of the game, titled Chrono Cross: The Radical Dreamers Edition (Note: Japanese: クロノ・クロス ： ラジカル・ドリーマーズ エディション, Hepburn: Kurono Kurosu： Rajikaru Dorīmāzu Edishon) was released on April 7, 2022, for Nintendo Switch, PlayStation 4, Windows, and Xbox One.

== Gameplay ==
Chrono Cross features standard role-playing video game gameplay with some differences. Players advance the game by controlling the protagonist Serge through the game's world, primarily by foot and boat. Navigation between areas is conducted via an overworld map, much like Chrono Trigger's, depicting the landscape from a scaled-down overhead view. Around the island world are villages, outdoor areas, and dungeons, through which the player moves in three dimensions. Locations such as cities and forests are represented by more realistically scaled field maps, in which players can converse with locals to procure items and services, solve puzzles and challenges, or encounter enemies. Like Chrono Trigger, the game features no random encounters; enemies are openly visible on field maps or lie in wait to ambush the party. Touching the monster switches perspectives to a battle screen, in which players can physically attack, use "Elements", defend, or run away from the enemy. Battles are turn-based, allowing the player unlimited time to select an action from the available menu. For both the playable characters and the computer-controlled enemies, each attack reduces their number of hit points (a numerically based life bar), which can be restored through some Elements. When a playable character loses all hit points, he or she faints. If all the player's characters fall in battle, the game ends and must be restored from a previously saved chapter—except for specific storyline-related battles that allow the player to lose. Chrono Cross's developers aimed to break new ground in the genre, and the game features several innovations. For example, players can run away from all conflicts, including boss fights and the final battle.

=== Battle and Elements ===
In battle, players can attack, use Elements, defend, or run away.

The Element system of Chrono Cross handles all magic, consumable items, and character-specific abilities. Elements unleash magic effects upon the enemy or party and must be equipped for use, much like the materia of 1997's Final Fantasy VII. Elements can be purchased from shops or found in treasure chests littered throughout areas. Once acquired, they are allocated to a grid whose size and shape are unique to each character. They are ranked according to eight tiers; certain high level Elements can only be assigned on equivalent tiers in a character's grid. As the game progresses, the grid expands, allowing more Elements to be equipped and higher tiers to be accessed. Elements are divided into six paired oppositional types, or "colors," each with a natural effect. Red (fire/magma) opposes Blue (water/ice), Green (wind/flora) opposes Yellow (earth/lightning), and White (light/cosmos) opposes Black (darkness/gravity). Each character and enemy has an innate color, enhancing the power of using same-color Elements while also making them weak against elements of the opposite color. Chrono Cross also features a "field effect", which keeps track of Element color used in the upper corner of the battle screen. If the field is purely one color, characters are able to unleash a powerful summon element at the cost of one of the player's stars. The field will also enhance the power of Elements of the colors present, while weakening Elements of the opposite colors. Characters also innately learn some special techniques ("Techs") that are unique to each character but otherwise act like Elements. Like Chrono Trigger, characters can combine certain Techs to make more powerful Double or Triple Techs. Consumable Elements may be used to restore hit points or heal status ailments during or after battle.

Another innovative aspect of Chrono Cross is its stamina bar. At the beginning of a battle, each character has seven points of stamina. When a character attacks or uses an Element, stamina is decreased proportionally to the potency of the attack. Stamina slowly recovers when the character defends or when other characters perform actions in battle. Characters with stamina below one point must wait to take action. Use of an Element reduces the user's stamina bar by seven stamina points; this often means that the user's stamina gauge falls into the negative and the character must wait longer than usual to recover. With each battle, players can enhance statistics such as strength and defense. However, no system of experience points exists; after four or five upgrades, statistics remain static until players defeat a boss. This adds a star to a running count shown on the status screen, which allows for another few rounds of statistical increases. Players can equip characters with weapons, armor, helmets, and accessories for use in battle; for example, the "Power Seal" upgrades attack power. Items and equipment may be purchased or found on field maps, often in treasure chests. Unlike Elements, weapons and armor cannot merely be purchased with money; instead, the player must obtain base materials—such as copper, bronze, or bone—for a blacksmith to forge for a fee. The items can later be disassembled into their original components at no cost.

=== Parallel dimensions ===
Players navigate the game's tropical setting by boat.

The existence of two major parallel dimensions, like time periods in Chrono Trigger, plays a significant role in the game. Players must go back and forth between the worlds to recruit party members, obtain items, and advance the plot. Much of the population of either world have counterparts in the other; some party members can even visit their other versions. The player must often search for items or places found exclusively in one world. Events in one dimension sometimes have an impact in the other—for instance, cooling scorched ground on an island in one world allows vegetation to grow in the other world. This system assists the presentation of certain themes, including the questioning of the importance of one's past decisions and humanity's role in destroying the environment. Rounding out the notable facets of Chrono Cross's gameplay are the New Game+ option and multiple endings. As in Chrono Trigger, players who have completed the game may choose to start the game over using data from the previous session. Character levels, learned techniques, equipment, and items gathered copy over, while acquired money and some story-related items are discarded. On a New Game+, players can access twelve endings. Scenes viewed depend on players' progress in the game before the final battle, which can be fought at any time in a New Game+ file.

== Plot ==
=== Characters ===
Chrono Cross features a diverse cast of 45 party members. Each character is outfitted with an innate Element affinity and three unique special abilities that are learned over time. If taken to the world opposite their own, characters react to their counterparts (if available). Many characters tie in to crucial plot events. Since it is impossible to obtain all 45 characters in one playthrough, players must replay the game to witness everything. Through use of the New Game+ feature, players can ultimately obtain all characters on one save file.

Serge, the game's protagonist, is a 17-year-old boy who lives in the fishing village of Arni. One day, he slips into an alternate world in which he drowned ten years before. Determined to find the truth behind the incident, he follows a predestined course that leads him to save the world. He is assisted by Kid, a feisty, skilled thief who seeks the mythical Frozen Flame. Portrayed as willful and tomboyish due to her rough, thieving past, she helps Serge sneak into Viper Manor in order to obtain the Frozen Flame. Kid vows to find and defeat Lynx, an anthropomorphic panther who burned down her adopted mother's orphanage.

Lynx, a cruel agent of the supercomputer FATE, is bent on finding Serge and using his body as part of a greater plan involving the Frozen Flame. Lynx travels with Harle, a mysterious, playful girl dressed like a harlequin. Harle was sent by the Dragon God to shadow Lynx and one day steal the Frozen Flame from Chronopolis, a task she painfully fulfills despite being smitten with Serge.

To accomplish this goal, Harle helps Lynx manipulate the Acacia Dragoons, the powerful militia governing the islands of El Nido. As the Dragoons maintain order, they contend with Fargo, a former Dragoon turned pirate captain who holds a grudge against their leader, General Viper. Though tussling with Serge initially, the Acacia Dragoons—whose ranks include the fierce warriors Karsh, Zoah, Marcy, and Glenn—later assist him when the militaristic nation of Porre invades the archipelago. The invasion brings Norris and Grobyc to the islands, a heartful commander of an elite force and a prototype cyborg soldier, respectively, as they too seek the Frozen Flame.

=== Story ===
The game begins with Serge located in El Nido, a tropical archipelago inhabited by ancient natives, mainland colonists, and beings called Demi-humans. Serge slips into an alternate dimension in which he drowned on the beach ten years prior, and meets the thief, "Kid". As his adventure proceeds from here, Serge is able to recruit a multitude of allies to his cause. While assisting Kid in a heist at Viper Manor to steal the Frozen Flame, he learns that ten years before the present, the universe split into two dimensions—one in which Serge lived, and one in which he perished. Through Kid's Astral Amulet charm, Serge travels between the dimensions. At Fort Dragonia, with the use of a Dragonian artifact called the Dragon Tear, Lynx switches bodies with Serge. Unaware of the switch, Kid confides in Lynx, who stabs her as the real Serge helplessly watches. Lynx boasts of his victory and banishes Serge to a strange realm called the Temporal Vortex. He takes Kid under his wing, brainwashing her to believe the real Serge (in Lynx's body) is her enemy. Serge escapes with help from Harle, although his new body turns him into a stranger in his own world, with all the allies he had gained up to that point abandoning him due to his new appearance. Discovering that his new body prevents him from traveling across the dimensions, he sets out to regain his former body and learn more of the universal split that occurred ten years earlier, gaining a new band of allies along the way. He travels to a forbidden lagoon known as the Dead Sea—a wasteland frozen in time, dotted with futuristic ruins. At the center, he locates a man named Miguel and presumably Home world's Frozen Flame. Charged with guarding the Dead Sea by an entity named FATE, Miguel and three visions of Crono, Marle, and Lucca from Chrono Trigger explain that Serge's existence dooms Home world's future to destruction at the hands of Lavos. To prevent Serge from obtaining the Frozen Flame, FATE destroys the Dead Sea.

Able to return to Another world, Serge allies with the Acacia Dragoons against Porre and locates that dimension's Dragon Tear, allowing him to return to his human form. He then enters the Sea of Eden, Another world's physical equivalent of the Dead Sea, finding a temporal research facility from the distant future called Chronopolis. Lynx and Kid are inside; Serge defeats Lynx and the supercomputer FATE, allowing the six Dragons of El Nido to steal the Frozen Flame and retire to Terra Tower, a massive structure raised from the sea floor. Kid falls into a coma, and Harle bids the party goodbye to fly with the Dragons. Serge regroups his party and tends to Kid, who remains comatose. Continuing his adventure, he obtains and cleanses the corrupted Masamune sword from Chrono Trigger. He then uses the Dragon relics and shards of the Dragon Tears to create the mythic Element Chrono Cross. The spiritual power of the Masamune later allows him to lift Kid from her coma. At Terra Tower, the prophet of time, revealed to be Belthasar from Chrono Trigger, visits him with visions of Crono, Marle, and Lucca. Serge learns that the time research facility Chronopolis created El Nido thousands of years ago after a catastrophic experimental failure drew it to the past. The introduction of a temporally foreign object in history caused the planet to pull in a counterbalance from a different dimension. This was Dinopolis, a city of Dragonians—parallel universe descendants of Chrono Trigger's Reptites. The institutions warred and Chronopolis subjugated the Dragonians. Humans captured their chief creation—the Dragon God, an entity capable of controlling nature.

Chronopolis divided this entity into six pieces and created an Elements system. FATE then terraformed an archipelago, erased the memories of most of Chronopolis's staff, and sent them to inhabit and populate its new paradise. Thousands of years later, a panther demon attacked a three-year-old Serge. His father took him to find assistance at Marbule, but Serge's boat blew off course due to a raging magnetic storm caused by Schala. Schala, the princess of the Kingdom of Zeal, had long ago accidentally fallen to a place known as the Darkness Beyond Time and began merging with Lavos, the chief antagonist of Chrono Trigger. Schala's storm nullified Chronopolis's defenses and allowed Serge to contact the Frozen Flame; approaching it healed Serge but corrupted his father, turning him into Lynx. A circuit in Chronopolis then designated Serge "Arbiter", simultaneously preventing FATE from using the Frozen Flame by extension. The Dragons were aware of this situation, creating a seventh Dragon under the storm's cover named Harle, who manipulated Lynx to steal the Frozen Flame for the Dragons.

After Serge returned home, FATE sent Lynx to kill Serge, hoping that it would release the Arbiter lock. Ten years after Serge drowned, the thief Kid—presumably on Belthasar's orders—went back in time to save Serge and split the dimensions. FATE, locked out of the Frozen Flame again, knew that Serge would one day cross to Another world and prepared to apprehend him. Lynx switched bodies with Serge to dupe the biological check of Chronopolis on the Frozen Flame. Belthasar then reveals that these events were part of a plan he had orchestrated named Project Kid. Serge continues to the top of Terra Tower and defeats the Dragon God. Continuing to the beach where the split in dimensions had occurred, Serge finds apparitions of Crono, Marle, and Lucca once more. They reveal that Belthasar's plan was to empower Serge to free Schala from melding with Lavos, lest they evolve into the "Time Devourer", a creature capable of destroying spacetime. Lucca explains that Kid is Schala's clone, sent to the modern age to take part in Project Kid. Serge uses a Time Egg—given to him by Belthasar—to enter the Darkness Beyond Time and vanquish the Time Devourer, separating Schala from Lavos and restoring the dimensions to one. Thankful, Schala muses on evolution and the struggle of life and returns Serge to his home, noting that he will forget the entire adventure. She then seemingly records the experience in her diary, noting she will always be searching for Serge in this life and beyond, signing the entry as Schala "Kid" Zeal, implying that she and Kid have merged and became whole again. A wedding photo of Kid and an obscured male sits on the diary's desk. Scenes then depict a real-life Kid searching for someone in a modern city, intending to make players entertain the possibility that their own Kid is searching for them. The ambiguous ending leaves the events of the characters' lives following the game up to interpretation.

=== Relation to Radical Dreamers ===
Chrono Cross employs story arcs, characters, and themes from Radical Dreamers, a Satellaview side story to Chrono Trigger released in Japan. Radical Dreamers is an illustrated text adventure which was created to wrap up an unresolved plot line of Chrono Trigger. Though it borrows from Radical Dreamers in its exposition, Chrono Cross is not a remake of Radical Dreamers, but a larger effort to fulfill that game's purpose; the plots of the games are irreconcilable. To resolve continuity issues and acknowledge Radical Dreamers, the developers of Chrono Cross suggested the game happened in a parallel dimension. A notable difference between the two games is that Magus—present in Radical Dreamers as Gil—is absent from Chrono Cross. Director Masato Kato originally planned for Magus to appear in disguise as Guile, but scrapped the idea due to plot difficulties. Kato specifically felt that the game's large number of characters, as well as the difficult production schedule, did not allow him to develop the relationship between Magus and Kid. In the DS version of Chrono Trigger, Kato teases the possibility of an amnesiac Magus.

== Development ==
Square began planning Chrono Cross immediately after the release of Xenogears in 1998 (which itself was originally conceived as a sequel to the SNES game). Chrono Trigger's scenario director Masato Kato had brainstormed ideas for a sequel as early as 1996, following the release of Radical Dreamers. Square's managers selected a team, appointed Hiromichi Tanaka producer, and asked Kato to direct and develop a new Chrono game in the spirit of Radical Dreamers. Kato thought Dreamers was released in a "half-finished state", and wanted to continue the story of the character Kid. Kato and Tanaka decided to produce an indirect sequel. They acknowledged that Square would soon re-release Chrono Trigger as part of Final Fantasy Chronicles, which would give players a chance to catch up on the story of Trigger before playing Cross. Kato thought that using a different setting and cast for Chrono Cross would allow players unfamiliar with Chrono Trigger to play Cross without becoming confused. The Chrono Cross team decided against integrating heavy use of time travel into the game, as they thought it would be "rehashing and cranking up the volume of the last game". Masato Kato cited the belief, "there's no use in making something similar to before [sic]", and noted, "we're not so weak nor cheap as to try to make something exactly the same as Trigger ... Accordingly, Chrono Cross is not Chrono Trigger 2. It doesn't simply follow on from Trigger, but is another, different Chrono that interlaces with Trigger." Kato and Tanaka further explained their intentions after the game's release:

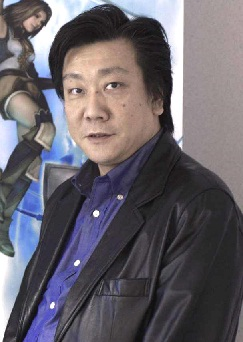
Hiromichi Tanaka, producer

We didn't want to directly extend Chrono Trigger into a sequel, but create a new Chrono with links to the original. Yes, the platform changed; and yes, there were many parts that changed dramatically from the previous work. But in my view, the whole point in making Chrono Cross was to make a new Chrono with the best available skills and technologies of today. I never had any intentions of just taking the system from Trigger and moving it onto the PlayStation console. That's why I believe that Cross is Cross, and NOT Trigger 2.

— Masato Kato

When creating a series, one method is to carry over a basic system, improving upon it as the series progresses, but our stance has been to create a completely new and different world from the ground up, and to restructure the former style. Therefore, Chrono Cross is not a sequel to Chrono Trigger. Had it been, it would have been called Chrono Trigger 2. Our main objective for Chrono Cross was to share a little bit of the Chrono Trigger worldview, while creating a completely different game as a means of providing new entertainment to the player. This is mainly due to the transition in platform generation from the SNES to the PS. The method I mentioned above, about improving upon a basic system, has inefficiencies, in that it's impossible to maximize the console's performance as the console continues to make improvements in leaps and bounds. Although essentially an RPG, at its core, it is a computer game, and I believe that games should be expressed with a close connection to the console's performance. Therefore, in regards to game development, our goal has always been to "express the game utilizing the maximum performance of the console at that time." I strongly believe that anything created in this way will continue to be innovative.

— Hiromichi Tanaka

Full production began on Chrono Cross in mid-1998. The Chrono Cross team reached 80 members at its peak, with additional personnel of 10–20 cut-scene artists and 100 quality assurance testers. The team felt pressure to live up to the work of Chrono Trigger's "Dream Team" development group, which included famous Japanese manga artist Akira Toriyama. Kato and Tanaka hired Nobuteru Yūki for character design and Yasuyuki Honne for art direction and concept art. The event team originally envisioned a short game, and planned a system by which players would befriend any person in a town for alliance in battle. Developers brainstormed traits and archetypes during the character-creation process, originally planning 64 characters with unique endings that could vary in three different ways per character. Kato described the character creation process: "Take Pierre, for example: we started off by saying we wanted a wacko fake hero like Tata from Trigger. We also said things like 'we need at least one powerful mom', 'no way we're gonna go without a twisted brat', and so on so forth."

As production continued, the length of Cross increased, leading the event team to reduce the number of characters to 45 and scrap most of the alternate endings. Developers humorously named the character Pip "Tsumaru" in Japanese (which means "packed") as a pun on their attempts to pack as much content into the game as possible. To avoid the burden of writing unique, accented dialogue for several characters, team member Kiyoshi Yoshii coded a system that produces accents by modifying basic text for certain characters. Art director Nobuteru Yuuki initially wanted the characters to appear in a more chibi format with diminutive proportions. The game world's fusion of high technology and ethnic, tribal atmospheres proved challenging at first. He later recalled striving to harmonize the time period's level of technology, especially as reflected in characters' garb. The demands of the art style led to Square merging the Final Fantasy VIII team into that of Chrono Cross two months before the Japanese release.

The Chrono Cross team devised an original battle system using a stamina bar and Elements. Kato planned the system around allowing players to avoid repetitive gameplay (also known as "grinding") to gain combat experience. Elements were developed while planning the final battle (during which a sequence of specific Elements must be triggered), and then applied in reverse to the rest of the game. Hiromichi Tanaka likened the Elements system to card games, hoping players would feel a sense of complete control in battle. The team programmed each battle motion manually instead of performing motion capture. Developers strove to include tongue-in-cheek humor in the battle system's techniques and animations to distance the game from the Final Fantasy franchise. Masato Kato planned for the game's setting to feature a small archipelago, for fear that players would become confused traveling in large areas with respect to parallel worlds. He hoped El Nido would still impart a sense of grand scale, and the development team pushed hardware limitations in creating the game's world. To create field maps, the team modeled locations in 3D, then chose the best angle for 2D rendering. The programmers of Chrono Cross did not use any existing Square programs or routines to code the game, instead writing new, proprietary systems. Other innovations included variable-frame rate code for fast-forward and slow-motion gameplay (awarded as a bonus for completing the game) and a "CD-read swap" system to allow quick data retrieval.

Masato Kato directed and wrote the main story, leaving sub-plots and minor character events to other staff. The event team sometimes struggled to mesh their work on the plot due to the complexity of the parallel worlds concept. Masato Kato confirmed that Cross featured a central theme of parallel worlds, as well as the fate of Schala, which he was previously unable to expound upon in Chrono Trigger. Concerning the ending sequences showing Kid searching for someone in a modern city, he hoped to make players realize that alternate futures and possibilities may exist in their own lives, and that this realization would "not ... stop with the game". He later added, "Paraphrasing one novelist's favorite words, what's important is not the message or theme, but how it is portrayed as a game. Even in Cross, it was intentionally made so that the most important question was left unanswered." Kato described the finished story as "ole' boy-meets-girl type of story" with sometimes-shocking twists. Kato rode his motorcycle to relieve the stress of the game's release schedule. He continued refining event data during the final stages of development while the rest of the team undertook debugging and quality control work. Square advertised the game by releasing a short demo of the first chapter with purchases of Legend of Mana. The North American version of Cross required three months of translation and two months of debugging before release. Richard Honeywood translated, working with Kato to rewrite certain dialogue for ease of comprehension in English. He also added instances of wordplay and alliteration to compensate for difficult Japanese jokes. To streamline translation for all 45 playable characters, Honeywood created his own version of the accent generator which needed to be more robust than the simple verbal tics of the Japanese cast. Although the trademark Chrono Cross was registered in the European Union, the game was not released in Europe.

After the game was done, the team was merged with those behind Parasite Eve II, Brave Fencer Musashi and Mana to make Final Fantasy XI. The programming for the game endured as the basis for the engine of Final Fantasy XI.

=== Music ===
"Dreams of the Ages"
A 30-second sample of "Dreams of the Ages", illustrating the use in the game's music of melodies established in Radical Dreamers.

Chrono Cross was scored by freelance video game music composer Yasunori Mitsuda, who previously worked on Chrono Trigger. Director Masato Kato personally commissioned Mitsuda's involvement, citing a need for the "Chrono sound". Kato envisioned a "Southeast Asian feel, mixed with the foreign tastes and the tones of countries such as Greece"; Mitsuda centered his work around old world cultural influences, including Mediterranean, Fado, Celtic, and percussive African music. Mitsuda cited visual inspiration for songs: "All of my subjects are taken from scenery. I love artwork." To complement the theme of parallel worlds, he gave Another and Home respectively dark and bright moods, and hoped players would feel the emotions of "'burning soul,' 'lonely world,' and 'unforgettable memories'". Mitsuda and Kato planned music samples and sound effects with the philosophy of "a few sounds with a lot of content".

Xenogears contributor Tomohiko Kira played guitar on the beginning and ending themes. Noriko Mitose, as selected by Masato Kato, sang the ending song—"Radical Dreamers – The Unstolen Jewel". Ryo Yamazaki, a synthesizer programmer for Square Enix, helped Mitsuda transfer his ideas to the PlayStation's sound capabilities; Mitsuda was happy to accomplish even half of what he envisioned. Certain songs were ported from the score of Radical Dreamers, such as "Gale", "Frozen Flame", and "Viper Mansion". Other entries in the soundtrack contain leitmotifs from Chrono Trigger and Radical Dreamers. The melody of "Far Promise ~ Dream Shore" features prominently in "Dreams of the Ages" and "Sailing (Another World)". Masato Kato faced internal opposition in hiring Noriko Mitose:

Personally, for me, the biggest pressure was coming from the ending theme song. From the start of the project, I had already planned to make the ending into a Japanese song, but the problem was now "who was going to sing the song?" There was a lot of pressure from the people in the PR division to get someone big and famous to sing it, but I was totally against the idea. And as usual, I didn't heed to the surrounding complaints, but this time, there was a pretty tough struggle.

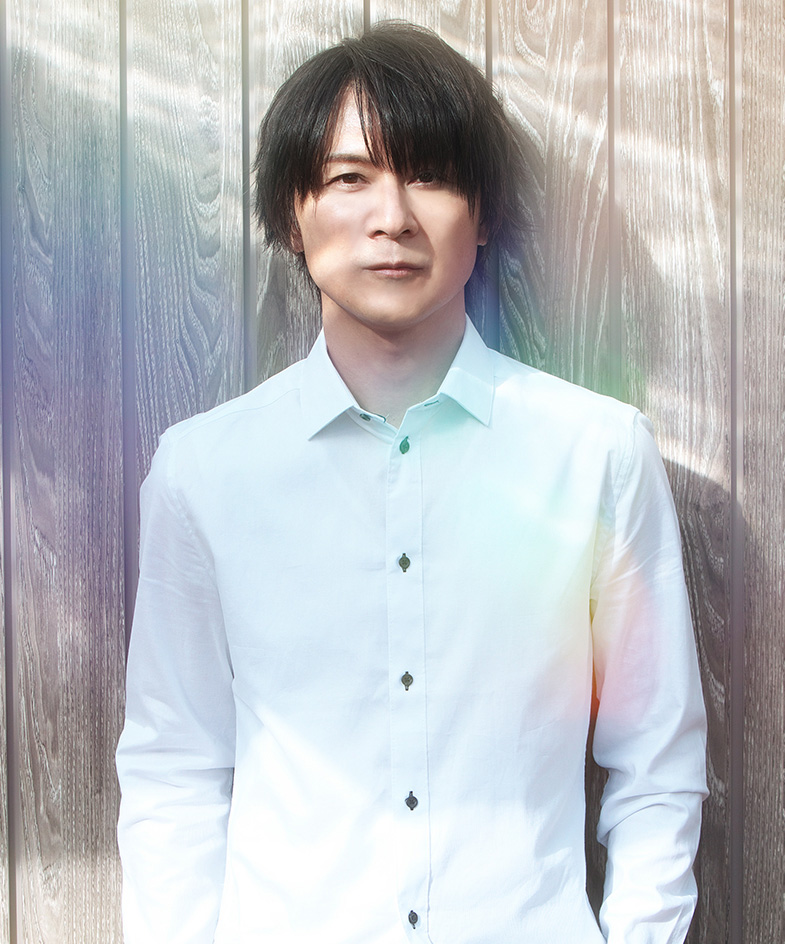
Yasunori Mitsuda

Production required six months of work. After wrapping, Mitsuda and Kato played Chrono Cross to record their impressions and observe how the tracks intermingled with scenes; the ending theme brought Kato to tears. Players who preordered the game received a sampler disc of five songs, and Square released a three-CD official soundtrack in Japan after the game's debut. The soundtrack won the Gold Prize for the PlayStation Awards of 2000. In 2005, Square Enix reissued the soundtrack due to popular demand. Earlier that year, Mitsuda announced a new arranged Chrono Cross album, scheduled for release in July 2005. Mitsuda's contract with Square gave him ownership and full rights to the soundtrack of Chrono Cross. It was delayed, and at a Play! A Video Game Symphony concert in May 2006, he revealed it would feature acoustic music and would be "out within the year", later backtracking and alleging a 2007 release date. Mitsuda posted a streaming sample of a finished track on his personal website in January 2009, and has stated the album will be released to coincide with the 10th anniversary of the Japanese debut of Cross. Music from Chrono Cross has been featured in the September 2009 Symphonic Fantasies concerts, part of the Symphonic Game Music Concert series conducted by Arnie Roth. That same year, the Chrono Cross theme "Scars of Time" was voted first place in Hardcore Gaming 101's "Best Video Game Music of All Time" poll. "Scars of Time" was also featured in 2012 by NPR in a program about classically arranged video game scores.

== Release and reception ==
Reception

Aggregate score
Aggregator	Score
Metacritic	94/100

Review scores
Publication	Score
Electronic Gaming Monthly	9.5/10, 10/10, 10/10
Famitsu	9/10, 9/10, 9/10, 9/10
GameRevolution	A−
GameSpot	10/10
IGN	9.7/10
Next Generation	4/5
Official U.S. PlayStation Magazine	5/5

Chrono Cross received critical acclaim, it shipped 850,000 units in Japan and 650,000 abroad by 2003. It was re-released once in the United States as a Sony Greatest Hits title and again as part of the Japanese Ultimate Hits series. Chrono Cross was also released on the PlayStation Network in Japan on July 6, 2011, and in North America on November 8, 2011, but a PAL region release has not been announced. Critics praised the game's complex plot, innovative battle system, varied characters, moving score, vibrant graphics, and success in breaking convention with its predecessor. Electronic Gaming Monthly gave Chrono Cross a Gold Award, with one reviewer calling it "a masterpiece, plain and simple". GameSpot awarded the game a perfect 10, one of only sixteen games in the 40,000 games listed on GameSpot to have been given the score, and its Console Game of the Year Award for 2000. It also received the annual Best Role-Playing Game, Best Game Music and Best PlayStation Game awards, and nominations for Best Game Story and Best Graphics, Artistic. IGN gave the game a score of 9.7, and Cross appeared 89th in its 2008 Top 100 games list. Famitsu rated the game 36 out of 40 from four reviewers. GamePro praised the plot, graphics and music while stating that the combos in the game were tough as there was a lot to learn about them.

Fan reaction was largely positive, though certain fans complained that the game was a far departure from its predecessor, Chrono Trigger; Chrono Cross broke convention by featuring more characters, fewer double and triple techs, fewer instances of time travel, and few appearances of Trigger characters and locations. Producer Hiromichi Tanaka and director Masato Kato were aware of the changes in development, specifically intending to provide an experience different from Chrono Trigger. Kato anticipated and rebuffed this discontent before the game's release, wondering what the Chrono title meant to these fans and whether his messages ever "really got through to them". He continued, "Cross is undoubtedly the highest quality Chrono that we can create right now. (I won't say the 'best' Chrono, but) If you can't accept that, then I'm sorry to say this but I guess your Chrono and my Chrono have taken totally different paths. But I would like to say, thank you for falling in love with Trigger so much." Tanaka added, "Of course, the fans of the original are very important, but what innovation can come about when you're bound to the past? I believe that gameplay should evolve with the hardware." Kato later acknowledged that he could have "shown more empathy to the player" by making the story less complex, and acknowledged fans who felt the game was a departure from Chrono Trigger, noting that one can still "equally enjoy the game." He later reflected in 2015 that "the bashing was terrible" in reference to fans' push-back on featuring so many playable characters, acknowledging the complaint that recruiting all characters required several playthroughs.

During the 4th Annual Interactive Achievement Awards, the Academy of Interactive Arts & Sciences nominated Chrono Cross for the "Game of the Year", "Console Game of the Year", and "Console Role-Playing" awards.

== Legacy ==
On December 9, 2021, a cross-over event between Chrono Cross and the free-to-play RPG Another Eden was released. A collaborative effort between Chrono writer Kato and composer Mitsuda, the game features elements similar to the Chrono series, such as talking frog protagonists and time-travel elements. Titled Complex Dream, the event introduces several Chrono Cross characters, including Serge, Kid, and Harle, as well as gameplay elements from the series such as element magic and combo techs.

=== Remaster ===
Publications began discussion of a possible remastered version of Chrono Cross in September 2021, when a security flaw allowed for a web developer to see an internal listing of current and upcoming video games in Nvidia's GeForce Now database, which included a never-announced Chrono Cross Remastered. Nvidia later confirmed that the list was real, but that the games listed were speculative, and may or may not end up getting a final release. A second Nvidia leak occurred the following November, which again listed Chrono Cross Remastered, this time with a December 2021 release date. Further comments on the game's existence also arose in November; Video Games Chronicle reported Nick Baker of the XboxEra podcast could confirm prior reports of its existence, and game website Gematsu separately confirmed the game's existence. On December 4, 2021, Square Enix announced a cross over event between Chrono Cross and mobile game Another Eden; the announcement spurred more discussion on a remaster, considering Square was reviving the game for the first time in 20 years, and writer Masato Kato worked on both games.

A remaster of the game, titled Chrono Cross: The Radical Dreamers Edition, was announced on February 9, 2022, during a Nintendo Direct presentation, being slated for release on April 7, 2022, for Nintendo Switch, PlayStation 4, Windows, and Xbox One. The remaster of the title includes quality-of-life updates such as the ability to disable encounters, in addition to an enhanced OST. The remaster is also bundled with the text adventure game Radical Dreamers, previously only available to Japanese players through the Satellaview peripheral for the Super Famicom. Masato Kato, Yasunori Mitsuda, Nobuteru Yuuki, and Hiromichi Tanaka were brought in to lightly polish the game's dialogue, music, character art, and mechanics, respectively. Tanaka revealed that the game's assets, stored on magnetic tape after development ceased in 1999, were lost in the intervening years, causing him to rely on a personal backup he had maintained for certain aspects of his polishing work. Producer Koichiro Sakamoto further explained that creating the remaster required teams to painstakingly upscale the game's original location art and remap each 3D field map, sometimes relying on AI to improve the resolution. The work demanded close scrutiny to ensure no original details were missed.

While Chrono Cross: The Radical Dreamers Edition was received well by critics, it received a negative reaction from players in part due to how it performed as compared to its PlayStation 1 counterpart. Analysis showed that the remastered version had its frame rate dropping quite frequently, and was also unable to cross the threshold of 30 FPS. This issue has been noticed across all the platforms it was released on.

On February 22, 2023, Square-Enix released an update patch for the remaster on all systems it released for which has fixed some of the various gameplay issues with the remaster, as well as updating several performance aspects of the game including increasing the game's framerate to 60fps.

=== Sequel ===
In 2001, Hironobu Sakaguchi revealed the company's staff wanted to develop a new game and were discussing script ideas. Although Kato was interested in a new title, the project had not been greenlighted. Square then registered a trademark for Chrono Break worldwide, causing speculation concerning a new sequel. Nothing materialized, and the trademark was dropped in the United States on November 13, 2003, though it still stands in Japan and the European Union. Kato later returned to Square Enix as a freelancer to work on Children of Mana and Dawn of Mana. Mitsuda also expressed interest in scoring a new Chrono series game. In 2005, Kato and Mitsuda teamed up to do a game called Deep Labyrinth, and again in 2008 for Sands of Destruction, both for the Nintendo DS. The February 2008 issue of Game Informer ranked the Chrono series eighth among the "Top Ten Sequels in Demand", naming the games "steadfast legacies in the Square Enix catalogue" and asking "what's the damn holdup?!" In Electronic Gaming Monthly's June 2008 "Retro Issue", writer Jeremy Parish cited Chrono as the franchise video game fans would be most thrilled to see a sequel to. In the May 1, 2009, issue of Famitsu, Chrono Trigger placed 14th out of 50 in a vote of most-wanted sequels by the magazine's readers. At E3 2009, SE Senior Vice President Shinji Hashimoto remarked, "If people want a sequel, they should buy more!"
