= Kyrie (Vivaldi) =

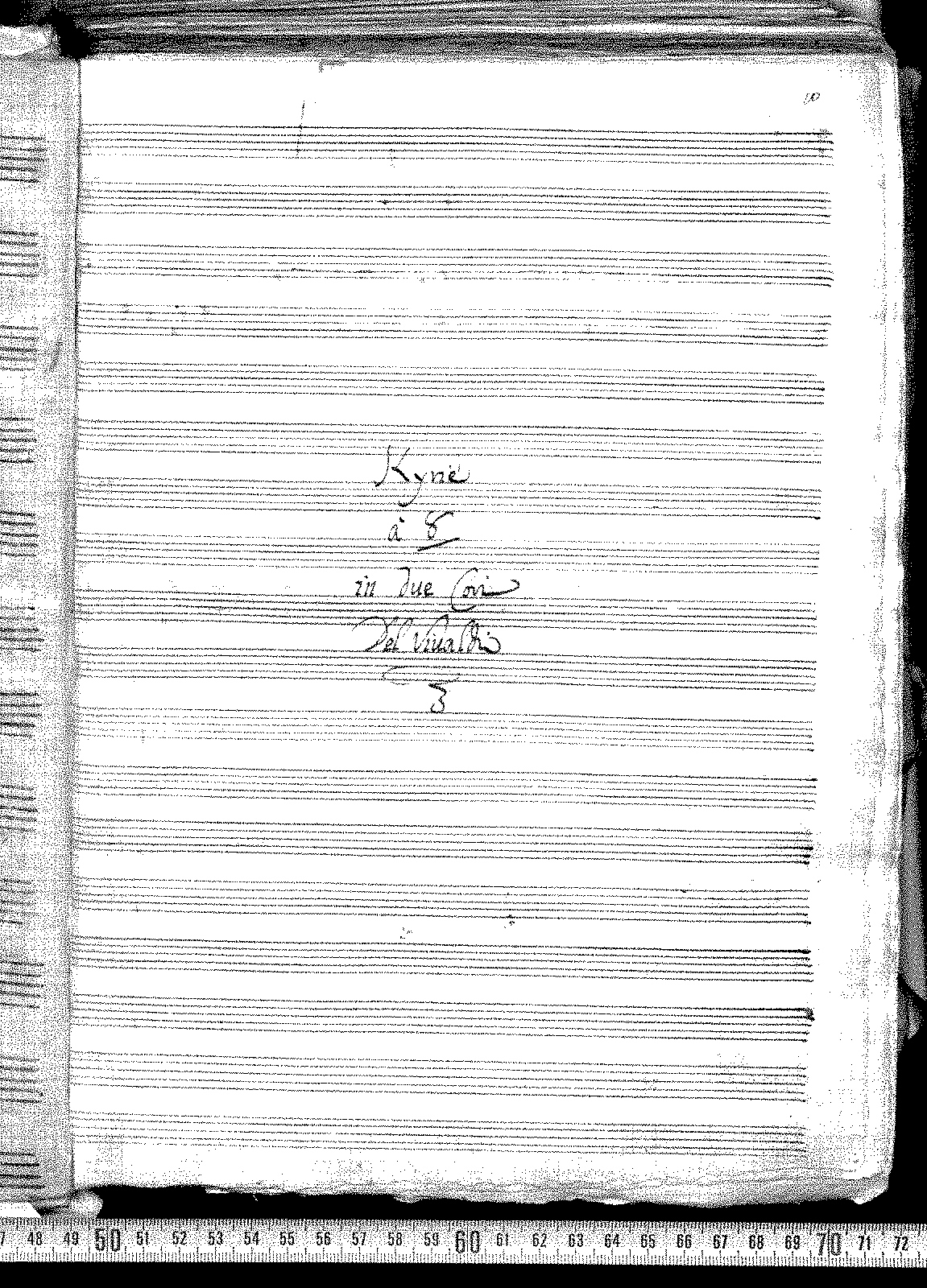
Kyrie, RV 587

The Kyrie in G minor (RV 587) by Antonio Vivaldi is a setting of the Kyrie for two cori (two orchestras, each with respective four-part chorus) written between 1720-35. This is the only extant setting of the Kyrie the composer wrote.

RV 587 is divided into three movements. The first movement begins with an orchestral interlude based on a modified version of the first movement of the composer's Magnificat. The chorus is adorned with descending quavers in the orchestra. The second movement is a duet between cori and for two soprani in each cori. The final movement unites the two cori with a brief grave and enters a fugue. The fugue would later be reworked for the composer's Concerto Madrigalesco (RV 129).
