= List of Square Enix companion books =

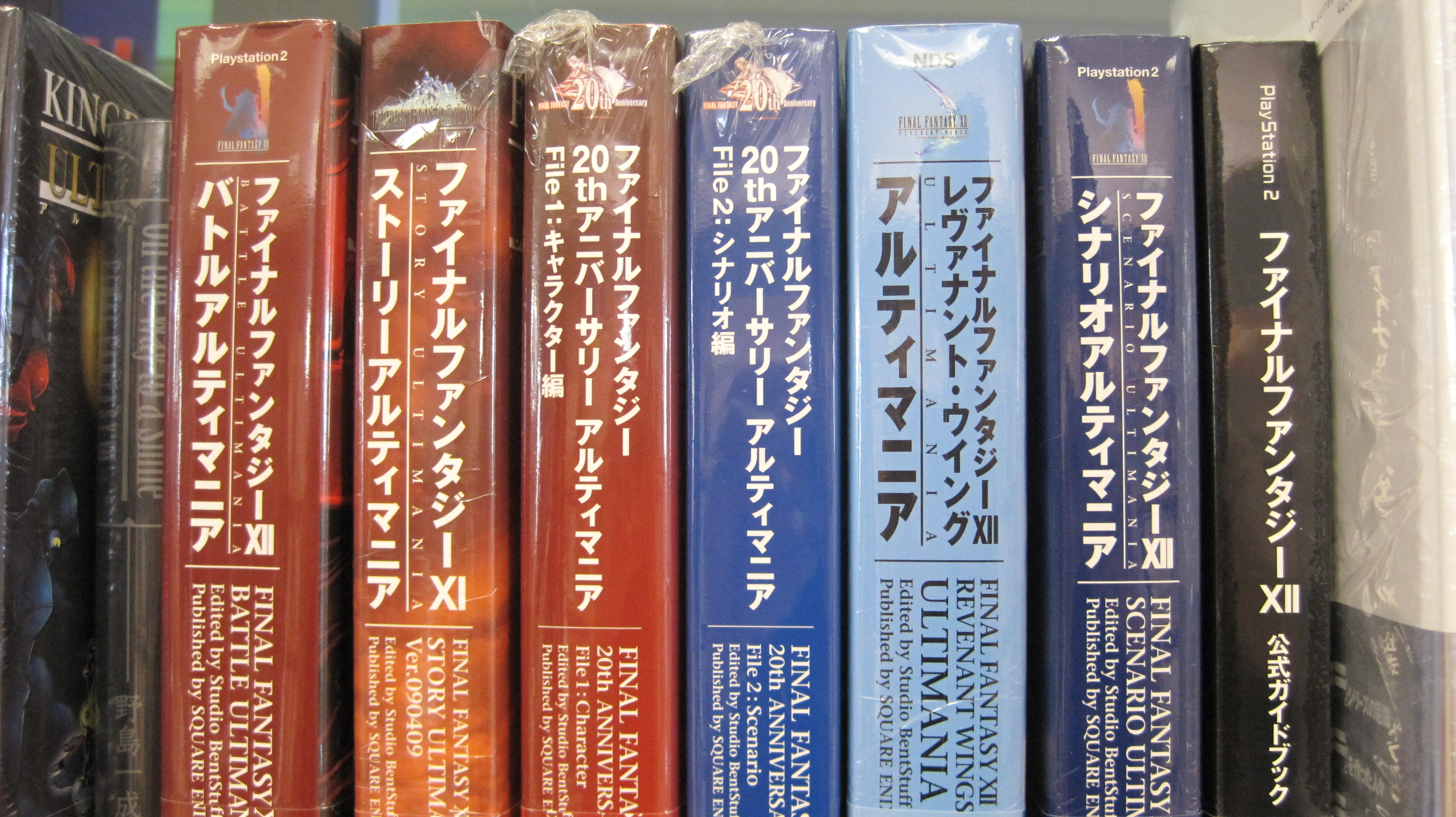
Various Ultimania books at a Books Kinokuniya in San Francisco, California

Dozens of Square Enix companion books have been produced since 1998, when video game developer Square began to produce books that focused on artwork, developer interviews, and background information on the fictional worlds and characters in its games rather than on gameplay details. The first series of these books was the Perfect Works series, written and published by Square subsidiary DigiCube. They produced three books between 1998 and 1999 before the line was stopped in favor of the Ultimania (アルティマニア, Arutimania) series, a portmanteau of ultimate and mania. This series of books is written by Studio BentStuff, which had previously written game guides for Square for Final Fantasy VII. They were published by DigiCube until the company was dissolved in 2003. Square merged with video game publisher Enix on April 1, 2003, to form Square Enix, which resumed publication of the companion books.

Both the Perfect Works and Ultimania books have focused primarily on Square and Square Enix's role-playing video game franchises, such as the Final Fantasy and Kingdom Hearts series; over half of the more than 75 books are for games related to the Final Fantasy series. Sometimes, multiple books have been written per game or revised editions have been published years afterwards. One of the books, Final Fantasy IX Ultimania Online, was solely published online as part of an experiment by Square Enix with online content delivery; another for Final Fantasy XI was planned, but the idea was abandoned as unsuccessful and all subsequent books have been published traditionally.

The books are written and edited by Studio BentStuff; beginning with Final Fantasy VII Remake Ultimania in 2020, they switched to be credited to both Studio BentStuff and its parent company Digital Hearts, and since 2023 with Final Fantasy XVI Ultimania they have been credited solely to Digital Hearts. The Ultimania series had sold over 10 million books by July 2007, increasing to over 12 million copies sold as of 2017. The highest selling Square Enix companion books are Final Fantasy VIII Ultimania (over 2.2 million copies) and Final Fantasy X Scenario Ultimania (over 1 million copies). The majority of the books have been released solely in Japanese. Dark Horse Books published English translations of the three-volume 2012 Final Fantasy 25th Memorial Ultimania as Final Fantasy Ultimania Archive in June 2018, and an English translation of the 2014 Kingdom Hearts Series Memorial Ultimania as Kingdom Hearts Ultimania: The Story Before Kingdom Hearts III in June 2021. Square Enix additionally released the Final Fantasy VII Remake Material Ultimania, Final Fantasy VII Remake Material Ultimania Plus, and Final Fantasy VII Rebirth Material Ultimania books in English.

== Perfect Works ==
Perfect Works titles
Title	Game	Date	ISBN	Ref.
Xenogears Perfect Works	Xenogears	October 10, 1998	ISBN 978-4-9250-7532-9	
SaGa Frontier II Perfect Works	SaGa Frontier 2	July 15, 1999	ISBN 978-4-9250-7554-1	
Front Mission 3 Perfect Works	Front Mission 3	November 20, 1999	ISBN 978-4-9250-7566-4	

== Ultimania ==
Ultimania titles
Title	Game	Date	ISBN	Ref.
Final Fantasy VIII Ultimania	Final Fantasy VIII	March 31, 1999	ISBN 978-4-9250-7549-7	
SaGa Frontier II Ultimania	SaGa Frontier 2	June 18, 1999	ISBN 978-4-9250-7553-4	
Seiken Densetsu: Legend of Mana Ultimania	Legend of Mana	September 30, 1999	ISBN 978-4-9250-7564-0	
Chrono Cross Ultimania	Chrono Cross	January 27, 2000	ISBN 978-4-9250-7573-2	
Vagrant Story Ultimania	Vagrant Story	April 13, 2000	ISBN 978-4-9250-7575-6	
Final Fantasy IX Online Ultimania	Final Fantasy IX	December 29, 2000	Internet-only	
Final Fantasy X Scenario Ultimania	Final Fantasy X	September 14, 2001	ISBN 978-4-8878-7010-9	
Final Fantasy X Battle Ultimania	Final Fantasy X	September 14, 2001	ISBN 978-4-8878-7011-6	
Final Fantasy X Ultimania Ω	Final Fantasy X	January 31, 2002	ISBN 978-4-8878-7021-5	
Final Fantasy IX Ultimania	Final Fantasy IX	February 28, 2002	ISBN 978-4-8878-7025-3	
Kingdom Hearts Ultimania	Kingdom Hearts	June 13, 2002	ISBN 978-4-8878-7042-0	
Kingdom Hearts Ultimania Revised Edition	Kingdom Hearts	January 9, 2003	ISBN 978-4-8878-7090-1	
Final Fantasy X-2 Ultimania	Final Fantasy X-2	May 31, 2003	ISBN 978-4-8878-7126-7	
Final Fantasy X-2 Ultimania Ω	Final Fantasy X-2	February 13, 2004	ISBN 978-4-7575-1161-3	
Final Fantasy Crystal Chronicles World Ultimania	Final Fantasy Crystal Chronicles	March 19, 2004	ISBN 978-4-7575-1162-0	
Final Fantasy X-2 Ultimania	Final Fantasy X-2	April 16, 2004	ISBN 978-4-7575-1205-4	
Final Fantasy X-2 International+Last Mission Ultimania	Final Fantasy X-2 International+Last Mission	April 16, 2004	ISBN 978-4-7575-1163-7	
Final Fantasy X Scenario Ultimania	Final Fantasy X	May 28, 2004	ISBN 978-4-7575-1215-3	
Final Fantasy X Battle Ultimania	Final Fantasy X	May 28, 2004	ISBN 978-4-7575-1216-0	
Final Fantasy X Ultimania Ω	Final Fantasy X	May 28, 2004	ISBN 978-4-7575-1214-6	
Final Fantasy VIII Ultimania	Final Fantasy VIII	June 25, 2004	ISBN 978-4-7575-1243-6	
Final Fantasy IX Ultimania	Final Fantasy IX	June 25, 2004	ISBN 978-4-7575-1244-3	
Chrono Cross Ultimania	Chrono Cross	July 30, 2004	ISBN 978-4-7575-1249-8	
Seiken Densetsu: Legend of Mana	Legend of Mana	July 30, 2004	ISBN 978-4-7575-1250-4	
Kingdom Hearts: Chain of Memories Ultimania	Kingdom Hearts: Chain of Memories	December 17, 2004	ISBN 978-4-7575-1344-0	
Kingdom Hearts Ultimania Revised Edition	Kingdom Hearts	December 17, 2004	ISBN 978-4-7575-1349-5	
Romancing SaGa: Minstrel Song Ultimania	Romancing SaGa: Minstrel Song	July 15, 2005	ISBN 978-4-7575-1487-4	
Final Fantasy VII Ultimania Ω	Final Fantasy VII	September 9, 2005	ISBN 978-4-7575-1520-8	
Kingdom Hearts Series Ultimania α ~Introduction of Kingdom Hearts II~	Kingdom Hearts	December 9, 2005	ISBN 978-4-7575-1597-0	
Kingdom Hearts II Ultimania	Kingdom Hearts II	February 23, 2006	ISBN 978-4-7575-1621-2	
Final Fantasy XII Scenario Ultimania	Final Fantasy XII	June 16, 2006	ISBN 978-4-7575-1696-0	
Final Fantasy XII Battle Ultimania	Final Fantasy XII	June 16, 2006	ISBN 978-4-7575-1697-7	
SaGa Frontier II Ultimania	SaGa Frontier 2	July 20, 2006	ISBN 978-4-7575-1733-2	
Vagrant Story Ultimania	Vagrant Story	July 20, 2006	ISBN 978-4-7575-1734-9	
Final Fantasy XII Ultimania Ω	Final Fantasy XII	November 24, 2006	ISBN 978-4-7575-1821-6	
Kingdom Hearts II Final Mix+ Ultimania	Kingdom Hearts II Final Mix+	May 2, 2007	ISBN 978-4-7575-2013-4	
Final Fantasy XII: Revenant Wings Ultimania	Final Fantasy XII: Revenant Wings	June 14, 2007	ISBN 978-4-7575-2024-0	
Final Fantasy XII International Zodiac Job System Ultimania	Final Fantasy XII International Zodiac Job System	September 6, 2007	ISBN 978-4-7575-2100-1	
Final Fantasy VII 10th Anniversary Ultimania	Final Fantasy VII	September 13, 2007	Part of the Final Fantasy VII Potion box set	
Crisis Core: Final Fantasy VII Ultimania	Crisis Core: Final Fantasy VII	October 18, 2007	ISBN 978-4-7575-2126-1	
Final Fantasy 20th Anniversary Ultimania File 1: Character	Final Fantasy series	January 31, 2008	ISBN 978-4-7575-2206-0	
Final Fantasy 20th Anniversary Ultimania File 2: Scenario	Final Fantasy series	April 10, 2008	ISBN 978-4-7575-2251-0	
Final Fantasy 20th Anniversary Ultimania File 3: Battle	Final Fantasy series	June 19, 2008	ISBN 978-4-7575-2320-3	
Dissidia Final Fantasy Ultimania α	Dissidia Final Fantasy	December 4, 2008	ISBN 978-4-7575-2466-8	
Chrono Trigger Ultimania	Chrono Trigger	January 20, 2009	ISBN 978-4-7575-2469-9	
Dissidia Final Fantasy Ultimania	Dissidia Final Fantasy	January 29, 2009	ISBN 978-4-7575-2488-0	
Final Fantasy VII 10th Anniversary Ultimania Revised Edition	Final Fantasy VII	April 16, 2009	ISBN 978-4-7575-2560-3	
Final Fantasy XI Story Ultimania Ver.090409	Final Fantasy XI	June 11, 2009	ISBN 978-4-7575-2507-8	
Kingdom Hearts 358/2 Days Ultimania	Kingdom Hearts 358/2 Days	June 25, 2009	ISBN 978-4-7575-2578-8	
Final Fantasy XIII Scenario Ultimania	Final Fantasy XIII	January 28, 2010	ISBN 978-4-7575-2775-1	
Final Fantasy XIII Battle Ultimania	Final Fantasy XIII	January 28, 2010	ISBN 978-4-7575-2776-8	
Kingdom Hearts Birth By Sleep Ultimania	Kingdom Hearts Birth by Sleep	March 25, 2010	ISBN 978-4-7575-2788-1	
Final Fantasy XIII Ultimania Ω	Final Fantasy XIII	September 30, 2010	ISBN 978-4-7575-2958-8	
Kingdom Hearts Re:coded Ultimania	Kingdom Hearts Re:coded	November 4, 2010	ISBN 978-4-7575-3050-8	
Dissidia 012 Final Fantasy Ultimania Action Side	Dissidia 012 Final Fantasy	March 10, 2011	ISBN 978-4-7575-3161-1	
Dissidia 012 Final Fantasy Ultimania RPG Side	Dissidia 012 Final Fantasy	March 31, 2011	ISBN 978-4-7575-3162-8	
Final Fantasy Type-0 Ultimania	Final Fantasy Type-0	November 30, 2011	ISBN 978-4-7575-3432-2	
Final Fantasy XIII-2 Scenario Ultimania	Final Fantasy XIII-2	January 31, 2012	ISBN 978-4-7575-3496-4	
Final Fantasy XIII-2 Battle Ultimania	Final Fantasy XIII-2	January 31, 2012	ISBN 978-4-7575-3497-1	
Kingdom Hearts 3D [Dream Drop Distance] Ultimania	Kingdom Hearts 3D: Dream Drop Distance	May 1, 2012	ISBN 978-4-7575-3615-9	
Final Fantasy XIII-2 Ultimania Ω	Final Fantasy XIII-2	June 21, 2012	ISBN 978-4-7575-3619-7	
Final Fantasy 25th Memorial Ultimania Volume 1	Final Fantasy series	December 18, 2012	ISBN 978-4-7575-3769-9	
Final Fantasy 25th Memorial Ultimania Volume 2	Final Fantasy series	December 18, 2012	ISBN 978-4-7575-3770-5	
Final Fantasy 25th Memorial Ultimania Volume 3	Final Fantasy series	December 18, 2012	ISBN 978-4-7575-3771-2	
Lightning Returns: Final Fantasy XIII Ultimania	Lightning Returns: Final Fantasy XIII	December 19, 2013	ISBN 978-4-7575-4158-0	
Final Fantasy X HD Remaster Ultimania	Final Fantasy X/X-2 HD Remaster	December 26, 2013	ISBN 978-4-7575-4159-7	
Final Fantasy X-2 HD Remaster Ultimania	Final Fantasy X/X-2 HD Remaster	January 30, 2014	ISBN 978-4-7575-4160-3	
Kingdom Hearts Series Memorial Ultimania	Kingdom Hearts series	October 2, 2014	ISBN 978-4-7575-4384-3	
Biohazard Revelations 2 Ultimania	Resident Evil: Revelations 2	March 26, 2015	ISBN 978-4-7575-4600-4	
Final Fantasy XV Ultimania - Scenario Side-	Final Fantasy XV	December 28, 2016	ISBN 978-4-7575-5214-2	
Final Fantasy XV Ultimania - Battle + Map Side -	Final Fantasy XV	December 28, 2016	ISBN 978-4-7575-5215-9	
Final Fantasy XII The Zodiac Age Ultimania	Final Fantasy XII: The Zodiac Age	July 13, 2017	ISBN 978-4-7575-5339-2	
Dissidia Final Fantasy NT Ultimania	Dissidia Final Fantasy NT	January 11, 2018	ISBN 978-4-7575-5615-7	
Another Eden: The Cat Beyond Time and Space World Ultimania	Another Eden	July 31, 2018	ISBN 978-4-7575-5800-7	
Kingdom Hearts III Ultimania	Kingdom Hearts III	February 28, 2019	ISBN 978-4-7575-6001-7	
Final Fantasy VII Remake Ultimania	Final Fantasy VII Remake	April 28, 2020	ISBN 978-4-7575-6586-9	
Final Fantasy VII Remake Material Ultimania	Final Fantasy VII Remake	October 29, 2020 (JA) / December 28, 2021 (EN)	ISBN 978-4-7575-6869-3 (JA) / ISBN 978-1-64609-121-8 (EN)	
Final Fantasy VII Remake Material Ultimania Plus	Final Fantasy VII Remake	July 25, 2021 (JA) / November 19, 2024 (EN)	ISBN 978-4-7575-7347-5 (JA) / ISBN 978-1-64609-176-8 (EN)	
Final Fantasy I-VI Pixel Remaster Memorial Ultimania	Final Fantasy I-VI Pixel Remasters	April 20, 2023	Included with Final Fantasy I-VI Pixel Remaster FF35th Anniversary Limited Edition	
Final Fantasy XVI Ultimania	Final Fantasy XVI	September 7, 2023	ISBN 978-4-7575-8707-6	
Final Fantasy VII Rebirth Ultimania	Final Fantasy VII Rebirth	April 12, 2024	ISBN 978-4-7575-9134-9	
Final Fantasy VII Rebirth Material Ultimania	Final Fantasy VII Rebirth	December 27, 2024	ISBN 978-4-7575-9540-8 (JA)/ISBN 978-1-6460-9472-1 (EN)	
