= Karri Chahar Bonicheh =

Karri Chahar Bonicheh كري چهاربنيچه
- Village
- Location within Iran
- Coordinates: 31°57′23″N 50°27′49″E
- Country: Iran
- Province: Chaharmahal and Bakhtiari
- County: Ardal
- Bakhsh: Central
- Rural District: Dinaran

Population (2006)
  - Total: 224
- Time zone: UTC+3:30 (IRST)
  - Summer (DST): UTC+4:30 (IRDT)

Karri Chahar Bonicheh (Persian: كري چهاربنيچه, also Romanized as Karrī Chahār Bonīcheh; also known as Karrī Chahār Bonīsheh, Korī Chahār Bīncheh, Korī-ye Chahār Pīcheh, and Kūy-ye Chahār Bonīsheh) is a village in Dinaran Rural District, in the Central District of Ardal County, Chaharmahal and Bakhtiari Province, Iran. At the 2006 census, its population was 224, in 34 families. The village is populated by Lurs.
