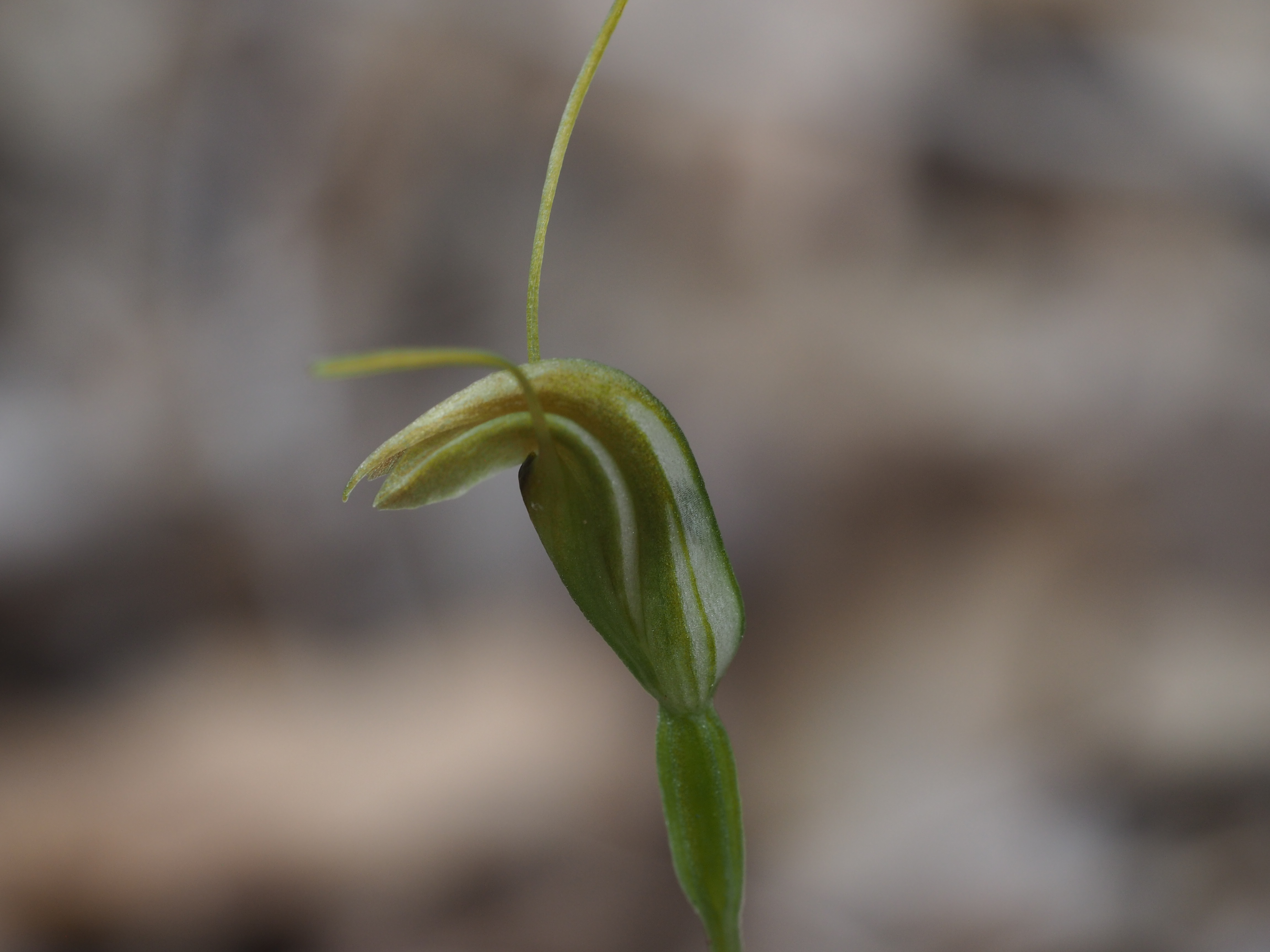
- Near Dunsborough

Scientific classification
- Kingdom: Plantae
- Clade: Tracheophytes
- Clade: Angiosperms
- Clade: Monocots
- Order: Asparagales
- Family: Orchidaceae
- Subfamily: Orchidoideae
- Tribe: Cranichideae
- Genus: Pterostylis
- Species: P. karri

Binomial name
- Pterostylis karri D.L.Jones & C.J.French

Synonyms
- Diplodium karri (D.L.Jones & C.J.French) D.L.Jones & M.A.Clem.; Pterostylis aff. nana

= Pterostylis karri =

Karri snail orchid

Species of orchid

Pterostylis karri, commonly known as the karri snail orchid, is a species of orchid endemic to the south-west of Western Australia. Both flowering and non-flowering plants usually have a small rosette of leaves and flowering plants have a single green and white flower with unusually long, erect lateral sepals. Like some similar greenhoods, it often forms dense colonies.

== Description ==
Pterostylis karri is a terrestrial, perennial, deciduous, herb with an underground tuber and a small rosette of leaves 10–20 mm (0.4–0.8 in) wide and 5–10 mm (0.2–0.4 in) although the rosette is absent in some specimens. Flowering plants have a single green and white flower 15–20 mm (0.6–0.8 in) long and 7–8 mm (0.28–0.31 in) wide on a flowering stem 100–400 mm (4–20 in) high. There are three to eight leaves 10–20 mm (0.4–0.8 in) long and 5–8 mm (0.2–0.3 in) wide on the flowering stem. The dorsal sepal and petals are fused, forming a hood or "galea" over the column. The lateral sepals are held close to the galea almost closing the front of the flower and have erect, thread-like tips 15–30 mm (0.6–1 in) long. The labellum is large but not visible from outside the flower. Flowering occurs from August to early December.

== Taxonomy and naming ==
Pterostylis karri was first formally described in 2014 by David Jones and Christopher French from a specimen collected south of Mandurah and the description was published in Australian Orchid Review. The species had previously been known as Pterostylis sp. 'karri' or Pterostylis sp. 'karri forest'. The specific epithet (karri) refers to the karri (Eucalyptus diversicolor) forest where this species often grows.

== Distribution and habitat ==
The karri snail orchid grows in moist places in shady forest and around granite outcrops between Walpole and Margaret River in the Jarrah Forest, Swan Coastal Plain and Warren biogeographic regions.

== Conservation ==
Pterostylis karri is classified as "not threatened" by the Western Australian Government Department of Parks and Wildlife.
