= Another Eden =

2017 video game

- Developer: Wright Flyer Studios
- Publisher: Wright Flyer Studios (Note: Mobile versions published outside of Japan by GREE, Inc.)
- Directors: Daisuke Taka; Kaito Furuya; Masato Kato
- Producers: Daisuke Taka; Souichi Tamura
- Artists: Takahito Exa; Shinwoo Chei
- Writer: Masato Kato
- Composers: Shunsuke Tsuchiya; Mariam Abounnasr; Yasunori Mitsuda
- Platforms: Android; iOS; Windows; Nintendo Switch; Nintendo Switch 2
- Release: Android, iOS: JP: April 12, 2017; NA: January 28, 2019; EU: June 26, 2019; Windows: WW: March 31, 2021; JP: December 6, 2021; WW: September 17, 2026; Nintendo Switch: WW: September 17, 2026; Nintendo Switch 2: WW: September 17, 2026
- Genre: Role-playing
- Mode: Single-player

Another Eden: The Cat Beyond Time and Space (Note: Japanese: アナザーエデン 時空を超える猫) is a free-to-play role-playing video game developed and published by Wright Flyer Studios. It features the collaboration of writer Masato Kato and composer Yasunori Mitsuda, who both worked on Xenogears and the Chrono series of role-playing games. Another Eden involves time travel elements, where players explore different points in time. The game was released for Android and iOS in Japan in April 2017 and worldwide in 2019, with a Windows port released in 2021. A reworked version, Another Eden Begins, was released for the Nintendo Switch, Nintendo Switch 2, and Windows in 2026.

== Gameplay ==
Despite being a mobile game created on the GREE platform, the game has little focus on social interactions and log-in bonuses frequently found on the platform. The game is free to play, with in-app purchases for in-game items. The game features an 114-chapter main scenario that continues to grow, with the gameplay involving the player time travelling through three main time periods; the past, present, and future.

The game primarily plays as a side-scrolling JRPG, at times opening up for full 3D movement. The player directly maneuvers a character between locations and interacts with non-playable characters to progress through the game. Confrontations with enemy characters are played out with turn-based battles. New characters will join the party and grow stronger naturally over the course of the game flow, however the player may opt to spend "Chronos Stones" to obtain a larger roster of characters to use throughout the game. "Chronos Stones", which can be obtained naturally through playing the game, or bought through in-app purchases, allows access to the "Star Dreaming Hall", which allows the player to gamble gacha-style for a wide variety of characters.

== Plot ==
The game centers around a boy named Aldo, the game's protagonist, and his sister, Feinne. The two live plain and peaceful lives in a small village; however, one day, the Beast King appears and seeks to use Feinne's dormant abilities to erase humans from the world, leaving the planet only for beast-kin. Aldo desperately attempts to rescue his sister from the Beast King, but a distortion in space-time occurs in the air and whisks Aldo away 800 years into the future.

== Development and release ==
Development on the game started in early 2015, with its first announcement occurring in September 2015, at that year's Tokyo Game Show. The game was revealed as a new project by Masato Kato, who had written and directed Chrono Cross, and wrote parts of Xenogears and Chrono Trigger. The game was developed by Wright Flyer Studios for iOS and Android devices on the GREE, Inc. platform, with Kato directing and writing the game's scenario and script. Kato collaborated with GREE producer Daisuke Takasaki, who previously worked on Puyo Puyo Quest, on the game, as they shared the same vision of putting a more traditional JRPG on mobile device, something Takasaki felt the platform generally lacked. Importance was placed on making free-range movement comfortable on button-less devices, something Takasaki felt was poorly, or not at all, implemented on many mobile RPGs. Graphics were kept two dimensional to help accommodate the game's large scope, with 2D graphics being cheaper and easier to create on a larger scale. This was necessary to realize Kato's large scope for the game's story as well. Similar to the Chrono series, the game is centered around time travel. Additionally, a "day and night" theme is also in the game.

The game's soundtrack was primarily composed by Shunsuke Tsuchiya and Mariam Abounnasr, with the opening theme and a few additional tracks by Yasunori Mitsuda, who had previously worked with Kato on Xenogears and the Chrono series. The development team was initially unsure on whether or not voice acting should be implemented into the game, though after an impromptu questionnaire was issued to fans, over 70% favored its inclusion, so the team decided in favor of it. However, the limitations of the game being on mobile platforms lead to it only being partial voice acting, not full voice acting for every scene. A two-disc official soundtrack was released by Procyon Studio, Mitsuda's music label, on September 27, 2017.

The game was initially targeting a release in mid-2016, but was later pushed back to April 12, 2017. Prior to the game's release, a sign-up for a 1,000 participant closed beta testing was held in late February 2017, and conducted for a week in March 2017. Post-release, the game received large-scale advertising and promotional support from GREE, including regularly released updates featuring new gameplay content. It was first released in English in selected countries on January 28, 2019, and in more regions on June 26, 2019. A Windows port was released on March 31, 2021, with one for Nintendo Switch under development.

In February 2026, a reworked version of the game, Another Eden Begins, was announced for Nintendo Switch, Nintendo Switch 2, and Windows, for release later in the year. In April 2026, Wright Flyer Studios announced that Another Eden Begins would launch worldwide on September 17, 2026, for Nintendo Switch, Nintendo Switch 2, and Steam.

== Reception ==
RPG Site praised the original Japanese release of the game, stating that despite it being on mobile devices, it still played like a "fun, traditional RPG" and that they could "barely call it a free-to-play game. The annoying trappings (like stamina and timers) are almost nonexistent". They also gave praise to the graphics, soundtrack, and post-release game updates.
