= Masato Kato =

Japanese video game screenwriter

- 加藤 正人
- Born: March 28, 1963 (age 63)
- Occupations: Video game artist, writer
- Years active: 1988–present

Masato Kato (加藤 正人, Katō Masato; born March 28, 1963) is a Japanese video game artist, scenario writer and director. In the early days of his career, he was credited under the pseudonyms of "Runmaru" and "Runmal". He then joined Square, and was most famous for penning the script of Chrono Trigger (based on a story draft by Yuji Horii), as well as Radical Dreamers, Xenogears, Chrono Cross, Final Fantasy XI and parts of Final Fantasy VII.

== Biography ==
=== Early years ===
Kato first worked for Tecmo on Captain Tsubasa and the Ninja Gaiden series. On his first three games, he moved from graphics, to graphics and scenario writing, to also directing the action elements. He went on to work for Gainax.

=== Square Co. ===
Masato Kato's first title at Square was Chrono Trigger as the game's story planner and script writer. The game's composer Yasunori Mitsuda have considered Kato to be one of the game's directors.

Kato stated that Chrono Cross development encountered difficulty in expanding the game world due to hardware limitations, and that they crammed as much data as they could onto the game disk. Conversely, developing the multiple game endings was seen as easier, on par with Chrono Trigger as a bonus for players who finished the game.

=== Freelance works ===
Kato left Square after designing the plot of Final Fantasy XI: Rise of the Zilart to become a freelance scenario writer. In addition to games for different companies, he has continued to work on Square Enix projects such as the World of Mana series, an enhanced port of Chrono Trigger for the Nintendo DS, and three more expansion chapters for Final Fantasy XI.

In 2017 he released a spiritual successor to the Chrono series for iOS and Android, titled "Another Eden: The Cat Beyond Time and Space." Similar to the SNES hit Chrono Trigger, Another Eden also involves time travel, where players get to explore three time periods out of ancient, contemporary, and the future. Additionally, the game features an opening theme created by Yasunori Mitsuda, who also worked on Chrono Trigger‘s music.

=== Writings ===
In 2005, Masato Kato also collaborated with Yasunori Mitsuda, longtime friend and music composer, to write a short story titled Five Seasons of kiЯitɘ, which Mitsuda accompanied with music on his album kiЯitɘ. The story and soundtrack have also been presented in opera form. Prior to this, Mitsuda composed the soundtrack for several of Kato's games, including Chrono Cross and Xenogears.

== Games ==
Kato has been credited for the following games:

=== Early games ===
- Captain Tsubasa (1988): animation sprites
- Ninja Gaiden (1988): pictures
- Ninja Gaiden II: The Dark Sword of Chaos (1990): movie director, scenario, pictures
- Ninja Gaiden III: The Ancient Ship of Doom (1991): director of action sequences
- Nadia: The Secret of Blue Water (1992): assistant director, planner, script writer, graphics
- Princess Maker 2 (1993): planner, script writer, graphics

=== Square ===
- Chrono Trigger (1995): director (uncredited), story planner, script writer
- Radical Dreamers: Nusumenai Hōseki (1996): director, scenario and script writer
- Final Fantasy VII (1997): event planner, script writer
- Xenogears (1998): event planner, script writer, lyricist
- Chrono Trigger (PlayStation enhanced port) (1999): supervisor
- Chrono Cross (1999): director, scenario and script writer, event planner, FMV storyboard
- Final Fantasy XI (2002): plot conception and events, lyricist
- Final Fantasy XI: Rise of the Zilart (2003): plot conception and events

=== Freelance ===
- Baten Kaitos: Eternal Wings and the Lost Ocean (2003): scenario writer, screenplay
- Deep Labyrinth (2006): scenario writer
- Dawn of Mana (2006): scenario writer
- Children of Mana (2006): scenario writer
- Heroes of Mana (2007): scenario writer
- Sands of Destruction (2008): scenario writer
- Chrono Trigger (Nintendo DS) (2008): supervisor
- A Crystalline Prophecy: Ode to Life Bestowing (2009): plot conception
- A Moogle Kupo d'Etat: Evil in Small Doses (2009): plot conception
- A Shantotto Ascension: The Legend Torn, Her Empire Born (2009): plot conception
- Shiren the Wanderer (2008): scenario writer
- Shiren the Wanderer 4 (2010): scenario writer
- Ninja Gaiden 3 (2012): story
- The Legend of Legacy (2015): writer
- Another Eden (2017): director, scenario, script writer, concept artist
