= Deep Labyrinth =

2004 video game

- North American Nintendo DS box art
- Developer: Interactive Brains
- Publishers: JP: Interactive Brains; NA: Atlus; EU: 505 Games; AU: Atlus
- Writer: Masato Kato
- Composer: Yasunori Mitsuda
- Platforms: Mobile phone, Nintendo DS
- Release: Mobile phone: JP: December 1, 2004 (Vodafone); JP: March 7, 2005 (FOMA); Nintendo DS: JP: March 23, 2006; NA: August 15, 2006; EU: February 9, 2007; AU: February 15, 2007
- Genre: Role-playing
- Mode: Single-player

Deep Labyrinth (Note: Japanese: ディープラビリンス, Hepburn: Dīpu Rabirinsu) is a 3D role-playing video game developed by Interactive Brains for mobile phone devices and the Nintendo DS handheld game system.

== Plot ==
Both versions of the game contain a campaign story where a man is unexpectedly warped into a labyrinth several stories tall while talking on his cell phone. Starting from the bottom, in the deeper of two basement floors, he quickly picks up a sword and shield and battles his way through every floor to the top, seeking the secrets of this mysterious place, answers to why he is trapped there and the identity of a mysterious girl whose soul is trapped in a crystal. Depending on how quickly the player is able to dispatch the final boss at the top, he may or may not save this girl.

The Nintendo DS version has an extra, easier, scenario intended for casual players, in which the main protagonists are a boy and his pet dog, named Shawn and Ace (Shou and Alf respectively in the Japanese version) respectively. One summer afternoon, Shawn goes for a drive with his parents and dog, Ace, but the family car suffers a flat tire in front of an abandoned mansion. Ace is upset by something inside the mansion and leaps out of the car to investigate. Shawn's parents follow Ace, but fail to return. As Shawn tentatively approaches the dilapidated structure, the entrance door swings open, and he's drawn into a magical vortex. Reunited with Ace, Shawn must travel into the heart of the Deep Labyrinth to rescue his parents.

The North American and Australian box art for the DS version depicts the original scenario, designated as the game's second chapter, titled "Wandering Soul", while the European and Japanese box art conversely shows the Shawn and Ace scenario, which is designated as the game's first chapter. While both stories do not connect, they both have similar plot elements and appear to occur in the same Deep Labyrinth, as they both include a room called the "Parallel Labyrinth", which is a hard-to-reach bonus area containing dangerous enemies and special gear in the former story.

== Gameplay ==
=== Nintendo DS version ===
From a first-person perspective, players must navigate through dungeons and environments in a 3-D world, battling enemies while searching for items, secret side areas and ways to unlock locked doors, whether with keys or magical spells. Both swordplay and sorcery are at the player's disposal, controlled using the Nintendo DS' stylus and touch screen, and the more frequently a player uses either means of attack, the stronger it will become. Players can also use shields to block and reduce damage from enemy attacks, or evade them with quick steps via circle strafing and an automatic lock-on system.

To cast magic spells, whose names are ancient Greek words (for instance, astrape for thunder and iaomai for healing), the player must trace out runic Kirie symbols across a 3 x 3 grid, using one unbroken stroke of the stylus over select squares in the grid. Spells cost mana and most spells must be learned either through leveling up or from reading Kirie slates that will teach particular spells. Players can only save their progress by talking to certain non-playable characters, and save points serve as checkpoints; should the player fall in battle from losing all health or getting hit by a death spell, unsaved progress is forfeited and the player must reload a previously saved game.

Shawn and Ace's story also makes use of the microphone, in which the player must blow or scream to it in order to advance the story.

== Development ==
Deep Labyrinth was developed by Interactive Brains, with Masato Kato writing the game's scenario and Yasunori Mitsuda composing its music. The game is billed as the first 3D RPG for Japanese mobile phones.

== Reception ==
Reception

Aggregate score
Aggregator	Score
Metacritic	57/100

Review scores
Publication	Score
Edge	4/10
Electronic Gaming Monthly	4.17/10 (Note: Three critics of Electronic Gaming Monthly gave the DS version each a score of 2/10, 3/10, and 7.5/10.)
Famitsu	26/40
Game Informer	4/10
GameDaily	6/10
GameSpot	6.3/10
GameSpy	3/5
IGN	6.5/10
Nintendo Power	6/10
RPGamer	2/5
RPGFan	48%
X-Play	2/5
411Mania	6.6/10

According to Nasaki Takeda, CEO and CTO of Interactive Brains, the mobile phone release of Deep Labyrinth was very popular, having been downloaded nearly 100,000 times prior to its North American DS launch.

In Japan, Famitsu gave the DS version a score of one eight and three sixes, for a total of 26 out of 40. Elsewhere, though, the port received "mixed" reviews according to video game review aggregator Metacritic.
