= Frog (Chrono Trigger) =

Fictional character from Chrono Trigger

- Chrono character
- Frog in Chrono Trigger
- First game: Chrono Trigger (1995)
- Designed by: Akira Toriyama

Frog (Japanese: カエル, Hepburn: Kaeru), also known as Glenn, is a fictional character in the 1995 video game Chrono Trigger. He was designed by the game's artist, Akira Toriyama. He is an anthropomorphic frog knight from the Middle Ages era who was cursed into the form by his nemesis, Magus. He was born as a human by the name Glenn and a friend of the late brave knight Cyrus. After witnessing Cyrus' death at the hands of Magus and being transformed into a frog, Frog vowed to avenge Cyrus by killing Magus. During the game, he obtains the Masamune (Grandleon in the Japanese version), an ancient sword whose offensive capabilities against magic users is Magus' major weakness. Frog wields a broadsword and can also learn "Water" and, like Marle, healing magic.

Frog's design in the final version of the game replaces that of a monster man character from the initial character sketches. Frog has received generally positive reception, with discussion by critics about the relationship between Frog and Magus. His dialogue was also the subject of discussion, particularly how he speaks compared to others in his time period.

== Concept and creation ==
Frog is a half-man, half-frog in the video game Chrono Trigger who was cursed with this form by one of the game's antagonists, Magus, against whom he seeks revenge. Frog originally came from a desire of the staff to use a non-human character due to Square thinking it would make battles more interesting. They considered a pig or monkey concept, but went with a frog because the staff felt they'd be too similar to humans. Frog initially started off as a sketch that lacked detail and finesse created by Yuji Horii, who then gave it to Chrono Trigger artist Akira Toriyama. He was identified as a favorite by multiple Chrono Trigger designers, including field designers Yasuyuki Honne and Akiyoshi Masuda. Chrono Trigger director Takashi Tokita regarded the ending where Frog and Magus do battle to be one of the best endings in Chrono Trigger.

In the Japanese version of Chrono Trigger, Frog's manner of speech is that of a "strong, independent, disciplined man," speaking in a way that tends to be "slightly more complicated" than most people. The English version of the game saw Frog given Elizabethan Olde English dialogue. The Nintendo DS version of Chrono Trigger dropped the Elizabethan dialogue for Frog.

== Appearances ==
In Chrono Trigger, Frog is a knight found in the Medieval era of 600 AD. He has multiple goals; his main goal is to defeat the wizard Magus, who has been at war with his kingdom, for turning him into a frog and for killing his mentor, Cyrus. When the player first meets Frog, he is attempting to rescue Queen Leene, who had been kidnapped by Magus' forces, and he joins with Crono and Lucca. After rescuing Leene (and in turn her descendant, Marle), he departs from the group. Frog, once Crono is able to get the legendary sword Masamune repaired and delivered to him, assists them in their fight against Magus, which ultimately sends them into the past after Magus summons the game's main antagonist, Lavos. When Frog reencounters Magus in 12,000 BC, he is given the option to do battle with Magus. If he does, Magus is defeated. If he does not, Magus joins the party. During an optional quest, Frog can lay his mentor to rest, which causes the Masamune to become the Masamune II. Frog is able to assist the party in defeating Lavos, which prevents the world from being destroyed in 1999 AD.

While Frog does not appear in the sequel, Chrono Cross, another character, Glenn, shares multiple elements, including their name, weapon of choice, and special skill. In Final Fantasy XIV, a character inspired by Frog was included.

Frog is featured as part of a series of Chrono Trigger figures.

== Reception ==
Game Informer writer Jeff Cork felt that Frog, along with Magus, was among the coolest characters in Chrono Trigger, commenting about how intense a dilemma there was between allowing Frog to defeat Magus and allowing Magus to join the party. TechRaptor writer Robert Grosso similarly discussed the significance of the relationship between Frog and Magus, describing them as "mirror foils" while noting how Frog fits the warrior archetype while Magus fits the black mage archetype. He stated that the two are both driven by revenge, Frog for Magus and Magus for Lavos, noting how Frog tends to push people away and take on his revenge as a solitary act of penance so he doesn't lose anyone else. He felt that the option to spare Magus reflected Frog's character growth, preventing him from being consumed by revenge. The moment when Frog first joins Crono's party was regarded as one of the best first encounters in a video game by IGN writer Marty Sliva, who felt that he was "possibly [his] favorite character in what's probably [his] favorite RPG." He attributed this to his theme, as well as the sheer power of Frog when compared to other characters in the game at that point. Author Fredrik Norman discussed various themes they felt were employed with Frog, including how his various traits impact his journey through an "existential maze." He also discussed Frog in the context of Magus, arguing that both are "always doomed to fail" and that there is an "inevitable gloom" at the center of revenge.

Regarding the relocalization of Frog's dialogue in Chrono Trigger on the DS, Siliconera staff felt that the original English translation made Frog's dialogue better, recommending a patch of the DS version to change the localization back. Writer Michael P. Williams found his manner of speech charming but "grammatically suspect," noting how he is the only character in his time period who speaks like that. He further points out that even when he was a human he didn't speak this way, suggesting he does so because of a desire to be more heroic. He stated that everything about Frog "oozes hero," discussing how Frog aspires to be like Cyrus which is "realized heteronormatively as a desire to protect Queen Leene." A writer for RPGFan picked Frog as his favorite character from Chrono Trigger, stating that it was one of the first times he became emotionally invested in a video game character. He felt that his appearance in the intro, where he departs from Cyrus' grave and walking away resolute, while "standard and tropey," was made all the better due to his frog design created by Toriyama.
