= Chrono Resurrection =

2004 video game

- The logo of the project's second version, based on Chrono Trigger's own logo
- Developer: Resurrection Games
- Designer: Nathan Lazur
- Artist: Luis Martins
- Composer: Mathew Valente
- Series: Chrono (unofficial)
- Platforms: Nintendo 64 (as CT64); Windows, GameCube, Xbox
- Release: None (set to December 25, 2004 before public closure)
- Genre: Role-playing
- Mode: Single-player

Chrono Resurrection, also known as Chrono Trigger: Resurrection, is an unreleased fangame developed by North American team Resurrection Games under Nathan Lazur's direction. It is based on the critically acclaimed role-playing game Chrono Trigger for the Super Nintendo Entertainment System by the Japanese company Square. The project was initially called CT64 and was meant to be a complete remake of the original game for the Nintendo 64, with both 2D and 3D playing modes.

After a first interruption in development, the project was redefined as a short interactive demo for Windows-based personal computers. New team members, including professional artists and designers, were recruited for the demo, which would feature ten scenes from Chrono Trigger and most of its playable characters. In 2004, the project was publicly closed after Square-Enix issued a cease-and-desist letter to Resurrection Games for trademark and copyright infringement. Despite its closure, the project has received critical and popular praise.

== Nintendo 64 version ==
Nathan Lazur initially planned to create a Chrono Trigger remake for the Nintendo 64, called CT64, using GNU-based homebrew tools. Lazur's motivation for the project came in 1999 when playing Chrono Trigger and Super Mario 64. The remake, developed by a team of four people, was Lazur's first attempt at creating a complete title. The game was intended to have two playing modes and the same battle system as the original.

The first mode would feature 2D and pre-rendered graphics enhanced with 3D spell and battle effects. Some of the effects created by Lazur would rely on software programming rather than the Nintendo 64 hardware, as the latter would not be capable of rendering them directly. The second mode would be a full 3D mode played in either regular or high display resolution, and would feature different level of detail textures depending on camera distances, to maximize clarity and performance. Both modes would be in a top-down perspective, although more cinematic camera angles, similar to those from The Legend of Zelda: Ocarina of Time, were also considered for the 3D mode.

A gallery feature was also planned and would allow players to unlock bonus material depending on their progression in the game. Fan artwork and music would be unlockable through this feature, as well as minigames, including a card game similar to Triple Triad from Final Fantasy VIII. The remake was expected to be released on the Internet for free and played on console emulators, since there would be no cartridge version due to financial constraints. Only a semi-working 3D test was actually completed, and the project was discontinued in mid-2000 due to a number of factors, including the accidental loss of Lazur's data and his desire to improve his programming skills.

== Second version ==
Concept art by Luis Martins, depicting his take on the character Magus originally designed by Akira Toriyama

=== Development ===
The second version of the project, tentatively called Chrono Trigger: Brink of Time then Chrono Resurrection, started development in April 2003. Lazur has given several reasons to explain his willingness to restart the project, including his experience coding for the Dreamcast Visual Memory Unit, programming for game developer DC Studios, and playing Chrono Cross, the official sequel to Chrono Trigger for PlayStation. Unlike CT64, the second version would be a short demo developed in a cross-platform engine with a single 3D playing mode. The Windows version was planned for a free Internet release, while GameCube and Xbox ports would be reserved for official developers with access to development kits of either of the two consoles.

The new development team was mostly recruited on the game developers website Gamasutra and worked in a small studio in Lazur's apartment, in Montreal, Quebec, Canada. The team included up to nine members, most of which had about two-and-a-half years of experiences in the industry. Lazur has admitted that he began to seriously focus on the quality of the demo only after art director Luis Martins joined the project. Other professional designers in the team included Moise Breton, a 3D artist who had worked on character models for the commercially successful movie The Matrix Reloaded, and Michel Cadieux, an animator who had worked for game company Microïds. Difficulties were encountered in the game engine development as Lazur was the unique programmer and worked from scratch.

The score for the demo was composed by Mathew Valente, who had been with the project since its Nintendo 64 version. The score was to consist in arrangements of the official Chrono Trigger soundtrack written by Yasunori Mitsuda, Nobuo Uematsu and Noriko Matsueda. Valente's goal was to retain the feeling of the original music while enhancing it for a modern platform. Most of the arrangements were created in the Impulse Tracker format, then converted to MIDI and enhanced with a number of tools.

The protagonist Crono as he appears in the first of the ten scenes of the demo

=== Content ===
The team tried to capture the feel of the original game with updated graphics and sounds in the demo. It was to feature ten short interactive scenes from Chrono Trigger. Despite receiving requests from fans, the development team did not intend to create a complete remake of the original game since they would not have the necessary resources, and because they thought the result would not have been on par with Square Enix-developed titles. The story of the game was altered slightly to allow for the ten scenes to better flow from one to the other.

The demo was meant to be played using a "default party" of characters, with other party members unlockable for additional replay value. Due to time constraints, the development team expected that two of the seven characters of the original game, Robo and Ayla, would have 50% chances of not being featured. While the team tried to capture the feel of the original game with updated graphics and sounds, the artists and animators faced difficulty in reproducing the characters due to the differences of style between the sprites, artwork and PlayStation version anime sequences. They noted, however, that they overcame the issues and managed to add a bit of their own art style into the game.

== Closure and aftermath ==
Chrono Resurrection was originally set for a Christmas 2004 release. However, Square Enix issued a cease-and-desist letter to Resurrection Games before the release for trademark and copyright infringement. Faced with a threat of legal action, the project was publicly closed on September 6, 2004. According to the development team, the website of the project had received significant hits from Square Enix Japanese IP addresses for a period of three months before the letter issuing. They assumed these visits were mostly from employees rather than top executives, and hoped the company would see the demo as how the team sees it, a tribute to Chrono Trigger rather than a replacement.

Gaming websites 1UP.com and GameSpot called the project's second version "ambitious" and praised its graphics, noting that the art style is mostly faithful to that of the original game's character designer Akira Toriyama. Website Nintendo World Report praised the game's graphics and music, and called the quality of the artwork "professional". 1UP.com judged the project's closure "unfortunate" but deduced that Square Enix could not leave the possibility of a "competing" Chrono Trigger remake open. GameSpot also expressed their disappointment in Square Enix's decision to shut down the "furthest along" of Chrono Trigger fan remakes, pointing at the fact that with no news of another official sequel, fans of the Chrono series "have been left in the cold". Website GamePro Australia called the project "possibly the greatest fan remake to get crushed under the huge shoe of a big-time developer".

Several Internet petitions were created by fans to pressure Square Enix into green-lighting Chrono Resurrection; none have had any effect, however. Nathan Lazur, though disappointed, holds no ill will towards Square Enix for protecting its intellectual property, and he has stated that he "felt honoured to even be recognized" by the company. He added that to avoid legal issues, developers of fangames should present their polished demos directly to the original publishers so that the products can be handled in a "more traditional business procedure". Before the closure of Chrono Resurrection, Lazur had stated that his team had no plans to remake other games after the project's completion and would have liked to develop an original concept based in feudal Japan.
