= Flea (Chrono Trigger) =

Fictional character in the Chrono series

- Chrono character
- Flea, as he appears in Chrono Trigger.
- First game: Chrono Trigger (1995)
- Designed by: Akira Toriyama

Flea, known as Mayonnai (マヨネー, Mayonē) in Japanese, is a fictional character in the Chrono series of video games. He is a shapeshifter that presents as feminine but identifies as a man and, in Japanese, uses feminine signifiers in his speech. He first appears in Chrono Trigger, where he serves as a subordinate to the antagonist Magus and cameos in the sequel, Chrono Cross. Flea has been recognized as a noteworthy LGBT character, particularly for non-binary and genderqueer people. Critics like writer Flynn Demarco and author William Gibbons felt disappointed by the use of stereotypes of transgender people and androgyny to represent villainy.

== Concept and creation ==
Flea was created for Chrono Trigger by artist Akira Toriyama. He presents as feminine but identifies as a man. Flea is named Mayonnai in Japanese, a play on mayonnaise. This was changed in the English version to Flea, based on the musician of the same name. Flea ends all of his sentences with "yo ne" (ヨネ, pronounced like 'yonnai' in mayonnaise) in the Japanese version, intended to be "[sickeningly] cutesy." He also speaks in a tough feminine tone, using the personal pronoun 'atai' (あたい). During English localization, the nature of Flea's character was partially lost due to Nintendo of America's strict policies on "sexually suggestive or explicit content." Feminine signifiers, such as a feminine manner of speaking, tildes, long vowel marks, and heart icons were absent in the English version. The Japanese version features an item called Mayonnai's Bra which was censored and changed to Flea Vest in the English version. Flea Vest was later changed to Flea Bustier in the Nintendo DS port's English localization.

== Appearances ==
Flea first appears in Chrono Trigger. In this game, he serves as a subordinate to one of the game's antagonists, Magus. He is encountered by the protagonists in Magus' Castle where he is mistaken for a woman. He clarifies that he is actually a man and elaborates that he views gender as irrelevant in comparison to power and beauty. Flea uses various attacks that inflict status effects including blindness, confusion, and rage. Flea is defeated, but returns along with fellow subordinates, Ozzie and Slash, to do battle against Magus who had defected to join the protagonists. Flea later appears in the sequel Chrono Cross in a cameo role in which players may choose to fight him.

== Reception ==
Flea has been discussed as an LGBT character by multiple critics, with critics like author William Gibbons noting how his androgyny is used to indicate villainy. Automaton writer Ritsuko Kawai discussed Flea's gender, citing him as an example of how LGBT depictions in video games in the 90s increased dramatically. While describing his design as seductive, he could not determine whether the character was meant to be transgender or queer. TechRadar writer Christian Guyton felt that Flea was handled well, particularly for an LGBT character from the 90s, noting how the main characters use male pronouns after they initially mistook him for a woman.

Flea has been criticized as being played for laughs by multiple critics, including RPGFan writer Nilson Carroll and IGN Japan writer Nayuta Miki. Carroll believed that androgyny was used to depict a character as villainous, stating that Flea falls under a stereotype of queer people being "villains, enchanters, people who are mystical but who should not be trusted." Despite this criticism, they attributed a large part of their discovery of their gender identity to Flea, particularly his line about gender not mattering to him while also expressing surprise that this line made it into the English localization of the game. This helped Carroll come to understand gender as being a fluid construct. Flea also made a lasting impact on Miki, believing that he was a transgender character and stating that he stood out among what they believed to be the role-playing genre's propensity to favor heterosexual romances with little representation for queer people.

Authors Adrienne Shaw and Elizaveta Friesem suggested that Flea was coded as non-binary or genderqueer, while author Madeleine Brookman expressed surprise that Nintendo of America allowed the localization team to depict him the way they did. Author Michael P. Williams felt Flea was an inauthentic representation of trans people and drag culture, referring to him instead as an okama. He discussed how Flea's attacks represent how people react to "nontraditional genderings," namely how Flea's status-effect attacks represent how people will "turn a blind eye" towards LGBT people, or will react with confusion or rage. He also noted a comment from sociologist James Valentine that, despite okama failing to pass as women, Flea does quite well. Writer Beth Cato lamented the lack of representation for transgender people in video games, feeling that Flea's portrayal was not adequate. Autostraddle writer Loraine commented on Flea's line about power and beauty positively, declaring him their favorite character in Chrono Trigger. Despite disappointment that he was a villain, they praised the game for not making a joke out of Flea's ambiguous gender. They were unsure of how Flea was meant to be depicted, citing poor representation of trans and gender-nonconforming people during localization. The Advocate writer Jacob Ogles regarded it as the "greatest pro-trans [line] in gaming history" and listed Flea as one of the best LGBT characters in video games.
