= Lucca Ashtear =

Fictional character from Chrono Trigger

- Chrono character
- Official art for Lucca Ashtear.
- First game: Chrono Trigger (1995)
- Designed by: Akira Toriyama

Lucca Ashtear (Japanese: ルッカ・アシュティア, Hepburn: Rukka Ashutia) is a character in the Chrono series of video games designed by Akira Toriyama. Her design did not change much during development, with the only major difference being a change in headgear. She is one of the main characters of the 1995 game Chrono Trigger by Square where she is known as a brilliant inventor in the canon of the series. She is the best friend of the protagonist Crono and is instrumental in advancing the story multiple times. She also appears in Chrono Cross as the caretaker to one of its protagonists, Kid.

She has received praise for being a positive example of a female scientist in video games, with one critic suggesting that she is a positive influence for aspiring female scientists and engineers. She has also been discussed as a character defying gender stereotypes, due to her style of clothing and high level of intelligence. A scene where her mother loses the use of her legs and Lucca has the opportunity to use time travel to prevent this has been the subject of positive reception, both for the possibility of failure and in how it impacts Lucca emotionally, regardless of success.

== Concept and creation ==
Lucca Ashtear's design was created by Akira Toriyama. Her design had been fairly consistent throughout development, though at one point she wore a headband instead of a cap. She bears some resemblance to his Dr. Slump character Arale Norimaki. Her personality is described as dependable but boisterous. She is a genius scientist who creates multiple advanced technologies, including teleporting and time travel technology. Director Yoshinori Kitase was responsible for the creation of extra scenes featuring Lucca. Chrono Trigger story planner and script writer Masato Katō noted that Lucca was the character in the game that he felt most emotionally attached to, due to her kindness, dignity, and occasional obliviousness. He also identified the first time Robo and Lucca met as one of his favorite events in the game. When discussing a theoretical game to follow Chrono Cross, Katō discussed an idea where Kid, Lucca's adopted daughter, went on a quest to save her, Crono, and Marle. He ultimately rejected this idea due to his principle that "the past is the past".

One significant scene relating to Lucca has her going back in time to save her mother from having her legs crushed, a task which may succeed or fail depending on players' ability. Originally, it was going to be impossible to prevent her injuries. While the solution to the scene involves inputting L, A, R, and A in the English version, the original Japanese version required players to input L, A, L, and A, which did not appear to have an easily discernible explanation since Lara's name is written in Japanese. In the Japanese version, past Lucca has letters written in the third person and initially wants to be a "normal bride" and thus dislikes science. If present Lucca fails to rescue her mother, she begins speaking in the third person; if she succeeds, her writing is a mixture of the first and third person. No matter whether she succeeds or fails, Lucca is driven to learn science to make sure something like this cannot happen again. In the English version, the bride aspect is dropped and replaced with an annoyance that her father is too busy with science to spend time with her.

In the original Japanese version, fellow playable character Ayla suggests an attraction to Lucca due to her power, causing Lucca to grow defensive and saying that she does not "swing that way". In the English Super Nintendo version, the suggestion that Ayla was attracted to Lucca was removed and replaced with showing respect to her for her power. Chrono Trigger DS localizer Tom Slattery changed this English localization to be close to the original without explicit reference to Ayla's attraction to Lucca.

== Appearances ==
Lucca first appears in the Super NES video game Chrono Trigger. She is the friend of protagonist Crono, both of whom live in the year 1000 AD, in Guardia Kingdon, in the capital city of Truce, where a Millennial Fair is being held. She invites Crono to witness her teleportation demonstration at the fair, and he brings a new companion, Marle, along. Marle winds up getting sent back in time to 600 AD while attempting to use the teleporter due to an interaction between her pendant and the machine, resulting in Crono going after her with Lucca's help. She later joins them using a time travel device she created and helps Crono rescue Marle. She returns to 1000 AD with Crono and Marle and helps Crono escape prison when he's mistakenly taken prisoner and sentenced to death for kidnapping Marle. The three are chased and escape through time into 2300 AD, where they discover a post-apocalypse and a robot named Robo who she repairs and accept into the team. They also learn that the cause of the apocalypse was a creature named Lavos who emerged from the Earth in 1999, and they vow to stop this from happening. They arrive at the End of Time, where Lucca gains the ability to use Fire magic. At this point, Lucca may be left out of the story for much of the game after this point due to time travel only allowing three entities to travel at a time.

After aiding in the growth of a forest, Lucca discovers a red time portal that sends her back to the day where her mother lost the use of her legs due to an accident with a machine of her father's. If present Lucca is able to input the correct password to deactivate the machine it stops and her mother in the present is no longer handicapped. She bonds with Robo following returning to the present, who tries to console her. When Crono is killed by Lavos, Lucca is visibly upset and feels guilty about not being able to help him. Lucca and the party eventually managed to defeat Lavos. In one ending of the game, Lucca is saddened over the possibility that Robo may cease to exist due to changing history.

In the PlayStation release of Chrono Trigger, one of the endings show Lucca finding an abandoned child who she takes in. This child turns out to be the character Kid from the sequel Chrono Cross. Lucca serves in a supporting role in this game as the owner of an orphanage, which she converted her house into. The game's antagonist, Lynx, killed her and burns down the orphanage in pursuit of a powerful artifact called the Frozen Flame. Following her death, Kid receives a letter that Lucca wrote to her about the ethical ramifications of their time travel. She makes a cameo appearance in the PlayStation video game Xenogears.

A figurine of Crono, Robo, and Lucca was shown at Toy Fair 2010.

== Reception ==
Since appearing in Chrono Trigger, Lucca has been met with positive reception, particularly as a positive example of a female scientist in video games. Jamin Warren of PBS' Game/Show regarded her as one of the best female video game characters due to her scientific prowess, which he feels can inspire future generations of female scientists and engineers. Author Michael P. Williams discussed her agency in Chrono Trigger, contrasting Lucca to Marle, particularly that Marle's advancement of the plot is passive while Lucca is a catalyst for multiple events. He goes on to discuss her design, which he matches with a stereotype described by journalist Miki Tanikawa of a female scientist who does not care about beauty. He goes on to discuss her status as a mother in Chrono Cross, questioning whether this takes away from her as a scientist. Author Madeleine Brookman noted Lucca's defiance of gender expectations, citing Lucca's non-feminine clothing, agency, and a level of brilliance that enables her to deal with advanced technology.

The scene depicting Lucca going back in time to when her mother became handicapped from a machinery accident has been covered by journalists and in academic studies. McGee Maxwell of GamesRadar+ found that it contrasts with the rest of Chrono Trigger due to being time-sensitive and permanent. They also discuss the stress players experience from guiding Lucca through this. Chad Concelmo of Destructoid suggested that one of the reasons it makes such an impact is that players can fail to save Lucca's mother. It was one of his favorite video game moments and one that made them feel for Lucca, particularly due to her being upset regardless of the outcome. The scene was covered in detail in the essay Playable Tragedy: Ergodic Tragedy in Squaresoft's Chrono Trigger by Luis Torres Meza. Meza uses the scene as an example of an argument made by author Jesper Juul in his 2013 work The Art of Failure, where Juul argues that video games allow for players to be complicit in what happens in a story, thus providing a "new type of tragedy". Juul suggests that her view on robots – that robots do not behave evilly without human influence – may have been influenced by the incident.
