= Lavos =

- Chrono character
- The external shell and mouthparts of Lavos as seen in Chrono Trigger
- First game: Chrono Trigger (1995)
- Designed by: Tsutomu Terada (sprite)

In-universe information
- Origin: Outer space

Lavos (ラヴォス, Ravosu) is a fictional extraterrestrial monster and the main antagonist of the 1995 role-playing video game Chrono Trigger, also appearing as an antagonist in its sequel, Chrono Cross. A parasitic alien that falls from the skies in 65,000,000 B.C., its impact results in an ice age. In the intervening time, it drains the planet's energy, until in 1999 A.D., it resurfaces, causing an apocalypse that destroys most life on the planet.

The character of Lavos became one of the most iconic antagonists in video games, and was praised by critics due to its Lovecraftian design, mysterious origins and motivations, and the player's unique ability to travel to 1999 and fight it at any time in the story, resulting in multiple potential endings, something assisted by the game's New Game Plus mode. By the same token, it was noted for lacking characterization and serving only as an evil force and motivator for the game's characters.

== Characteristics ==
The exterior of Lavos consists of a spiky shell that protects its true form within. It is suggested that Lavos originated as the spawn of another, similar creature, due to its life-cycle of replication. A parasite, Lavos travels from planet to planet, burrowing into the core and sapping its energy for millions of years, and collecting the DNA of its organisms for its own. Finally, upon the planet's eventual destruction, it creates Lavos Spawn, offspring that leave the planet and continue the cycle.

Lavos's mere presence has profound effect on organic life, with some characters attributing the evolution and extinction of many important organisms to it, especially humanoid races. There is reoccurring interest in the story from those seeking power to attempt to communicate with Lavos despite the danger; it is unclear whether Lavos is truly "evil" or even if it is fully sapient. It has a general lack of dialog and behaves similarly to an animal, being possibly oblivious to its effect on life beyond collateral damage. That said, Lavos' secondary and tertiary forms are technological in nature, suggesting some form of intellect.

== Appearances ==
=== Chrono Trigger ===
Lavos initially crash-lands on the planet in 65,000,000 B.C., an event witnessed by the prehistoric Ayla, who coins the name "Lavos" by combining the Iokan words for "big" and "fire". As Lavos is a name invented by humans, its true name, if one exists, is completely unknown. The ensuing ice age causes the Reptites, an advanced species of reptilian humanoids, to go extinct, incidentally ensuring the survival of the human race. In 12,000 B.C., the Kingdom of Zeal is powered by the energy of Lavos through the use of the Mammon Machine, although this relationship is symbiotic, with Lavos also gathering the kingdom's magic. Queen Zeal attempts to use the machine to harness even more power, via her daughter, Schala. Magus intervenes, rescuing Schala, but prompting the awakening of Lavos and the destruction of Zeal. In 600 A.D., Lavos awakens yet again when the party battles Magus, causing a split in the timeline. Finally, in 1999 A.D., the "Day of Lavos", a recording shows Lavos emerging from underground and destroying the world, leaving only a few human survivors and no food. Lavos then possibly moves beneath Death Peak, where many of its spawn can be found in the post-apocalyptic world of 2300 A.D.

The battle against Lavos in 1999 A.D. starts with its outer shell, which goes through phases in which it mimics other bosses the player has fought. After the shell is defeated, the player moves inside to fight its true form, first as a giant humanoid whose arms must be destroyed before the head is vulnerable, and then as a smaller humanoid with two assisting "bits" (although the right side bit is actually the true essence of Lavos). While players can battle Lavos at any time after arriving at the End of Time, they will struggle to beat it before the recommended point in the story and achieve many of the game's multiple endings. However, New Game Plus mode allows players to defeat Lavos early with much greater ease, prompting many what-if scenarios, some of which are joke endings.

The 2008 Nintendo DS port of the game links the story to Chrono Cross by adding a hidden superboss, the Dream Devourer, the result of Schala becoming fused with Lavos following the disaster at the Ocean Palace. The Dream Devourer's defeat at the hands of Crono and his allies only momentarily frees Schala from its control, who tells Magus to forget she ever existed.

=== Radical Dreamers and Chrono Cross ===
The interactive fiction spin-off Radical Dreamers reveals that a wayward piece of Lavos, the Frozen Flame, enabled early humans to communicate with the creature, greatly evolving them and allowing them to both use magic and create the Kingdom of Zeal. This plot point is also used in Chrono Cross, where the Frozen Flame is again a major aspect of the story. The final boss, the Devourer of Time, is a fusion of Lavos, Schala, and the Dragon God capable of destroying all of spacetime if left to its own devices. As in the previous game, there are also numerous alternate endings caused by defeating it at various times in the story.

== Development ==
Lavos' sprite was drawn by Tsutomu Terada. Due to a lack of references by Akira Toriyama, there were many arguments within Square on how he would have designed different aspects of Lavos when creating its in-game representation. The creature has Lovecraftian influences, with its Japanese name possibly referencing Ravukurafuto, the Japanese rendering of "Lovecraft". Similar to the Great Ones of the cosmic horror genre, Lavos is also an ancient creature from beyond the known universe. However, its physical design, which is not inconceivable or amorphous, as well as its penchant for indiscriminate destruction, more resembles that of a kaiju.

== Reception ==
Jeremy Signor of 1UP called Lavos "mysterious" and "strange", with "a truly alien vibe that we rarely see in media" that depicts "the inherent 'otherness' of beings from another world". In Reverse Design: Chrono Trigger, Patrick Holleman stated that the boss battle against Lavos was not "especially difficult", with the initial boss rush being "a little cheesy", but that it was nevertheless an "unqualified success" due to its status as serving as the culmination of the game's story. Casey Foot of TheGamer described Lavos as "the perfect antagonist for Chrono Trigger’s story", explaining that it did not distract from the other plot points, acting as "an overarching threat" that, across different time periods, the characters must come together to defeat. However, Bryan Vore of Game Informer critiqued Lavos as a "faceless engine of destruction" rather than a true character, saying that Magus needed to "pick up Lavos' slack".

The Escapist writer Anthony John Angello discussed Lavos in the context of the real-world climate crisis. They note that unlike in reality, where the existential threat is complicated, with multiple causes and issues to address, Lavos represents a singular threat that the protagonists need to defeat in order to save the world. They speculated that the reason why it seemed so easy for the protagonists to pursue defeating Lavos is because of the singular nature of the threat, whereas unifying people against climate change was far more difficult. Angello also drew parallels between the message that reads if players experience a game over while fighting Lavos: "But ... the world refused to change" and James Lovelock's longstanding opinion that "changing [the] future" is impossible.

Writer Michael P. Williams compared Lavos to creatures in Lovecraftian works, citing aspects such as destruction of the world for its gain, its driving insane of Earth's inhabitants, and it being an "ancient being from beyond the known universe." Williams notes that Lavos is unlike Lovecraftian creatures in other ways, such as it being "deadly physical and highly resilient" unlike Lovecraftian works' "inconceivable, amorphous horror" creatures. Williams noted Lavos as not being evil, unlike other characters in games at the time, such as Kefka from Final Fantasy VI and Zemus from Final Fantasy IV, who Williams compared to Queen Zeal instead. Williams argued that, regardless of the harm Lavos poses, Lavos was necessary for the survival of the human race.

== See also ==
- Characters of Chrono Trigger
- Jenova, a similar extraterrestrial parasite from Squaresoft.
