= Chrono Trigger =

1995 video game

- North American SNES box art by Akira Toriyama
- Developer: Square (Note: Ported to PlayStation and Nintendo DS by Tose. All subsequent versions of the game are developed by Square Enix.)
- Publisher: Square (Note: PlayStation version published by Square Electronic Arts in North America. All other releases of the game are published by Square Enix.)
- Directors: Takashi Tokita; Yoshinori Kitase; Akihiko Matsui
- Producer: Kazuhiko Aoki
- Designer: Hironobu Sakaguchi
- Programmers: Katsuhisa Higuchi; Keizo Kokubo
- Artists: Akira Toriyama; Yasuhiko Kamata; Masanori Hoshino; Tetsuya Takahashi
- Writers: Masato Kato; Takashi Tokita; Yoshinori Kitase; Yuji Horii
- Composers: Yasunori Mitsuda; Nobuo Uematsu; Noriko Matsueda
- Series: Chrono
- Platforms: SNES; PlayStation; Nintendo DS; i-mode; iOS; Android; Windows; Apple TV
- Release: March 11, 1995: Super NES; JP: March 11, 1995; NA: August 22, 1995; PlayStation; JP: November 2, 1999; NA: June 29, 2001; Nintendo DS; JP: November 20, 2008; NA: November 25, 2008; AU: February 3, 2009; EU: February 6, 2009; i-mode; JP: April 25, 2011; iOS; WW: December 8, 2011; Android; JP: December 22, 2011; WW: October 29, 2012; Windows; WW: February 27, 2018
- Genre: Role-playing
- Modes: Single-player, multiplayer (DS)

Chrono Trigger (Note: Japanese: クロノ・トリガー, Hepburn: Kurono Torigā) is a 1995 role-playing video game developed and published by Square for the Super Nintendo Entertainment System. It is the first installment of the Chrono series. The game's plot follows a group of adventurers who travel through time to prevent a global catastrophe.

The game's development team included three designers that Square dubbed the "Dream Team": Hironobu Sakaguchi, creator of Square's Final Fantasy series; Yuji Horii, creator of Enix's Dragon Quest series; and Akira Toriyama, character designer of Dragon Quest and author of the Dragon Ball manga series. In addition, Takashi Tokita co-directed the game and co-wrote the scenario, Kazuhiko Aoki produced the game, while Masato Kato wrote most of the story.

Chrono Trigger was a critical and commercial success upon release, receiving multiple accolades from gaming publications, and is considered one of fourth-generation console gaming's most significant titles and one of the greatest video games ever made. Nintendo Power magazine described aspects of the game as revolutionary, including its multiple endings, plot-related side-quests focusing on character development, unique battle system, and detailed graphics. The game's soundtrack, scored by Yasunori Mitsuda with assistance from veteran Final Fantasy composer Nobuo Uematsu, has been hailed as one of the best video game soundtracks of all time. Chrono Trigger was the second best-selling game of 1995 in Japan, and the various incarnations of the game have shipped more than 5 million copies worldwide.

The game has been re-released on several other platforms with varying differences. A port by Tose for the PlayStation was released only in Japan in 1999, which was later repackaged with a Final Fantasy IV port as Final Fantasy Chronicles (2001) exclusively in North America. A slightly enhanced Chrono Trigger, again ported by Tose, was released for the Nintendo DS in Japan and North America in 2008, and PAL regions in 2009. The game has also been ported to i-mode, the Virtual Console, the PlayStation Network, iOS, and Android. In 2018, a higher resolution version was released for Windows via Steam.

== Gameplay ==
Chrono Trigger features standard turn-based role-playing video game gameplay. The player controls the protagonist and his companions in the game's two-dimensional world, consisting of various forests, cities, and dungeons. Navigation occurs via an overworld map, depicting the landscape from a scaled-down overhead view. Areas such as forests, cities, and similar places are depicted as more realistic scaled-down maps, in which players can converse with locals to procure items and services, solve puzzles and challenges, or encounter enemies. Chrono Trigger's gameplay deviates from that of traditional Japanese RPGs in that, rather than appearing in random encounters, many enemies are openly visible on field maps or lie in wait to ambush the party. Contact with enemies on a field map initiates a battle that occurs directly on the map rather than on a separate battle screen.

Unlike most other role-playing games at the time, combat in Chrono Trigger occurs in the same area where general navigation occurs, with all enemies visible on screen.

Players and enemies may use physical or magical attacks to wound targets during battle, and players may use items to heal or protect themselves. Each character and enemy has a certain number of hit points; successful attacks reduce that character's hit points, which can be restored with potions and spells. When a playable character loses all hit points, they faint; if all the player's characters fall in battle, the game ends and must be restored from a previously saved chapter, except in specific storyline-related battles that allow or force the player to lose. Between battles, a player can equip their characters with weapons, armor, helmets, and accessories that provide special effects (such as increased attack power or defense against magic), and various consumable items can be used both in and out of battles. Items and equipment can be purchased in shops or found on field maps, often in treasure chests. By exploring new areas and fighting enemies, players progress through Chrono Trigger's story.

Chrono Trigger uses an "Active Time Battle" system—a recurring element of Square's Final Fantasy game series designed by Hiroyuki Ito for Final Fantasy IV—named "Active Time Battle 2.0". Each character can take action in battle once a personal timer dependent on the character's speed statistic counts to zero. Magic and special physical techniques are handled through a system called "Techs". Techs deplete a character's magic points (a numerical meter similar to hit points), and often have special areas of effect; some spells damage huddled monsters, while others can harm enemies spread in a line. Enemies often change positions during battle, creating opportunities for tactical Tech use. A unique feature of Chrono Trigger's Tech system is that numerous cooperative techniques exist. Each character receives eight personal Techs which can be used in conjunction with others' to create Double and Triple Techs for greater effect. For instance, Crono's sword-spinning Cyclone Tech can be combined with Lucca's Flame Toss to create Fire Whirl. When characters with compatible Techs have enough magic points available to perform their techniques, the game automatically displays the combo as an option.

Chrono Trigger features several other distinct gameplay traits, including time travel. Players have access to seven eras of the game world's history, and past actions affect future events. Throughout history, players find new allies, complete side quests, and search for keynote villains. Time travel is accomplished via portals and pillars of light called "time gates", as well as a time machine named Epoch. The game contains twelve unique endings (thirteen in DS, iOS, Android and Steam versions); the ending the player receives depends on when and how they reach and complete the game's final battle. The DS version of Chrono Trigger features a new ending that can be accessed from the End of Time upon completion of the final extra dungeon and optional final boss. Chrono Trigger also introduces a New Game Plus option; after completing the game, the player may begin a new game with the same character levels, techniques, and equipment, excluding money, with which they ended the previous playthrough. However, certain items central to the storyline are removed and must be found again, such as the sword Masamune. Square has employed the New Game Plus concept in later games including Chrono Cross and Final Fantasy XV among others.

== Story ==
=== Setting ===
Chrono Trigger takes place in an Earth-like world, with eras such as the prehistoric age, in which primitive humans and dinosaurs share the earth; the Middle Ages, replete with knights, monsters, and magic; and the post-apocalyptic future, where destitute humans and sentient robots struggle to survive. The characters frequently travel through time to obtain allies, gather equipment, and learn information to help them in their quest. The party also gains access to the End of Time (represented as year ∞), which serves as a hub to travel back to other time periods. The party eventually acquires a time-machine vehicle known as the Wings of Time, nicknamed the Epoch (this default name can be changed by the player when the vehicle is acquired). The vehicle is capable of time travel between any time period without first having to travel to the End of Time.

=== Characters ===
Chrono Trigger's six playable characters (plus one optional character) come from different eras of history. Chrono Trigger begins in 1000 AD with Crono, Marle, and Lucca. Crono is the silent protagonist, characterized as a fearless young man who wields a katana in battle. Marle, revealed to be Princess Nadia, lives in Guardia Castle; though sheltered, she is at heart a princess who seeks independence from her royal identity. Lucca is a childhood friend of Crono's and a mechanical genius; her home is filled with laboratory equipment and machinery. From the era of 2300 AD comes Robo, or Prometheus (designation R-66Y), a robot with a near-human personality created to assist humans. Lying dormant in the future, Robo is found and repaired by Lucca, and joins the group out of gratitude. The fiercely confident Ayla dwells in 65,000,000 BC. Unmatched in raw strength, Ayla is the chief of Ioka Village and leads her people in war against a species of humanoid reptiles known as Reptites.

The last two playable characters are Frog and Magus. Frog originated in 600 AD. He is a former squire once known as Glenn, who was turned into an anthropomorphic frog by Magus, who also killed his friend Cyrus. Chivalrous but mired in regret, Frog dedicates his life to protecting Leene, the queen of Guardia, and avenging Cyrus. Meanwhile, Guardia in 600 AD is in a state of conflict against the Mystics (known as Fiends in the US/DS port), a race of demons and intelligent animals who wage war against humanity under the leadership of Magus, a powerful sorcerer. Magus's seclusion conceals a long-lost past; he was formerly known as Janus, the young prince of the Kingdom of Zeal, which was destroyed by Lavos in 12,000 BC. The incident sent him forward through time, and as he ages, he plots revenge against Lavos and broods over the fate of his sister, Schala. Lavos, the game's main antagonist who awakens and ravages the world in 1999 AD, is an extraterrestrial, parasitic creature that harvests DNA and the Earth's energy for its own growth.

=== Plot ===
In 1000 AD, Crono and Marle watch Lucca and her father demonstrate her new teleporter at the Millennial Fair in the Kingdom of Guardia. When Marle volunteers to be teleported, her pendant interferes with the device and creates a time portal into which she is drawn. After Crono and Lucca separately recreate the portal and find themselves in 600 AD, they locate Marle, only to see her vanish before their eyes. Lucca realizes that this time period's kingdom has mistaken Marle (who is actually Princess Nadia of Guardia) for Queen Leene, an ancestor of hers who had been kidnapped, thus putting off the recovery effort for her ancestor and creating a grandfather paradox. Crono and Lucca, with the help of Frog, restore history to normal by rescuing Leene. After the three part ways with Frog and return to the present, Crono is framed for kidnapping Marle and sentenced to death by the current chancellor of Guardia. Lucca and Marle help Crono escape prison, haphazardly using another time portal to evade their pursuers. This portal lands them in 2300 AD, where they learn that an advanced civilization has been wiped out by a giant creature known as Lavos that appeared in 1999 AD, and find the last remnants of humanity living in underground domes subsisting off of machine energy in place of food. The three vow to find a way to prevent the future destruction of their world. After meeting and repairing Robo, Crono and his friends find Gaspar, an old sage residing in an atemporal space known as the End of Time, who offers them the ability to travel through time by way of several pillars of light. (The party is able to challenge Lavos at any point after this scene, with completion of the game prior to its final chapter unlocking one of twelve different endings.)

The party discover that a powerful mage named Magus summoned Lavos into the world in 600 AD. To stop Magus, Frog requires the legendary sword, Masamune, to open the way to the mage's castle. In search of ore to re-forge the sword, the party travel to prehistoric times and meet Ayla, the chief of an ancient hunter-gatherer tribe. The subsequent battle with Magus disrupts his spell to summon Lavos, opening a temporal distortion that throws Crono and his friends to prehistory. The party assist Ayla in battling the Reptites, enemies of prehistoric humans. The battle is cut short as the party witness the true origin of Lavos, who descends from deep space and crashes into the planet before burrowing to its core. Entering a time gate created by Lavos's impact, the party arrive in the ice age of 12,000 BC. There, the utopic Kingdom of Zeal resides on islands raised above the icy surface using energy harnessed from Lavos's body beneath the earth's crust via a machine housed on the ocean floor. The party are imprisoned by the Queen of Zeal on the orders of its mysterious Prophet, and are ultimately banished, with the time gate leading to 12,000 BC sealed by the Prophet. Seeking a way to return, the party discover a time machine in 2300 AD called the Wings of Time (or Epoch), which can access any time period at will. The party return to 12,000 BC, where Zeal inadvertently awakens Lavos, leading the Prophet to reveal himself as Magus, who tries and fails to kill the creature. Lavos defeats Magus and kills Crono, before the remaining party are transported to the safety of the surface by Schala, Zeal's princess. Lavos annihilates the Kingdom of Zeal, whose fallen continent causes devastating floods that submerge most of the world's landmass.

Magus confesses to the party that he used to be Prince Janus of Zeal, Schala's brother, and that in the original timeline, he and the Gurus of Zeal were scattered across time by Lavos's awakening in 12,000 BC. Stranded as a child in 600 AD, Janus took the title of Magus and gained a cult of followers while plotting to summon and kill Lavos in revenge for the death of his sister. Magus tried once more after the party's battle in his castle returned him to Zeal, where he disguised himself as the Prophet. At this point, Magus is either killed by the party, killed in a duel with Frog, or spared and convinced to join the party. The ruined Ocean Palace then rises into the air as the Black Omen, Queen Zeal's floating fortress. The group turns to Gaspar for help, and he gives them a "Chrono Trigger", a device that allows the group to replace Crono just before the moment of death with an identical doppelgänger (doing so is optional, and the game's ending will change depending on the player's decision). The party then gather power by helping people across time with Gaspar's instructions. Their journeys involve defeating the remnants of the Mystics, stopping Robo's maniacal AI creator, giving Frog closure for Cyrus's death, locating and charging up the mythical Sun Stone, retrieving the legendary Rainbow Shell, unmasking Guardia's Chancellor as a saboteur, restoring a forest destroyed by a desert monster, and preventing an accident that disabled Lucca's mother. The party then enter the Black Omen and defeat Queen Zeal, after which they battle Lavos. They discover that Lavos is self-directing his evolution via absorbing DNA and energy from every living creature before razing the planet's surface in 1999 AD, so that it could spawn a new generation to destroy other worlds and continue the evolutionary cycle. The party slay Lavos, and celebrate at the final night of the Millennial Fair before returning to their own times.

If Magus joined the party, he departs to search for Schala. If Crono was resurrected before defeating Lavos, his sentence for kidnapping Marle is revoked by her father, King Guardia XXXIII, thanks to testimonies from Marle's ancestors and descendants, whom Crono had helped during his journey. Crono's mother accidentally enters the time gate at the Millennial Fair before it closes, prompting Crono, Marle, and Lucca to set out in the Epoch to find her while fireworks light up the night sky. If Crono was not resurrected, Frog, Robo, and Ayla (along with Magus if he was recruited) chase Gaspar to the Millennial Fair and back again, revealing that Gaspar knows how to resurrect Crono; Marle and Lucca then use the Epoch to travel through time to accomplish this. Alternatively, if the party used the Epoch to break Lavos's outer shell, Marle will help her father hang Nadia's bell at the festival and accidentally get carried away by several balloons. If resurrected, Crono jumps on to help her, but cannot bring them down to earth. Hanging on in each other's arms, the pair travel through the cloudy, moonlit sky.

Chrono Trigger DS added two new scenarios to the game. In the first, Crono and his friends can help a "lost sanctum" of Reptites, who reward powerful items and armor. The second scenario adds ties to Trigger's sequel, Chrono Cross. In a New Game Plus, the group can explore several temporal distortions to combat shadow versions of Crono, Marle, and Lucca, and to fight Dalton, who promises in defeat to raise an army in the town of Porre to destroy the Kingdom of Guardia. The group can then fight the Dream Devourer, a prototypical form of the Time Devourer—a fusion of Schala and Lavos seen in Chrono Cross. A version of Magus pleads with Schala to resist; though she recognizes him as her brother, she refuses to be helped and sends him away. Schala subsequently erases his memories and Magus awakens in a forest, determined to find what he had lost.

== Development ==
Chrono Trigger was conceived in October 1992 by Hironobu Sakaguchi, producer and creator of the Final Fantasy series; Yuji Horii, writer, game designer and creator of the Dragon Quest series; and Akira Toriyama, character designer of Dragon Quest and creator of the Dragon Ball manga series. Traveling to the United States to research computer graphics, the three, that Square dubbed the "Dream Team", decided to create something that "no one had done before". Toriyama's editor, Kazuhiko Torishima, later credited the concept to a fusion of "Dragon Quest plus Final Fantasy", and arranged for Enix to lend Yuji Horii to Squaresoft for development. After spending over a year considering the difficulties of developing a new game, the three received a call from Kazuhiko Aoki, who offered to produce. The four met and spent four days brainstorming ideas for the game. Square convened 50–60 developers, including scenario writer Masato Kato, whom Square designated story planner; development started in early 1993. An uncredited Square employee suggested that the team develop a time travel-themed game, which Kato initially opposed, fearing repetitive, dull gameplay. Kato and Horii then met several hours per day during the first year of development to write the game's plot; Horii desired a silent protagonist from the outset. Square intended to license the work under the Mana franchise and gave it the working title Maru Island; Hiromichi Tanaka (the future producer of Chrono Cross) monitored Toriyama's early designs. The team hoped to release it on Nintendo's planned SNES-CD; when Nintendo canceled the project, Square reoriented the game for release on a Super Famicom cartridge and rebranded it as Chrono Trigger. Tanaka credited the ROM cartridge platform for enabling seamless transition to battles on the field map. While Chrono Trigger had been planned for a 24-megabit cartridge, Square ultimately chose a 32-megabit platform, enabling additional graphics and music. Torishima later reflected that at least one early revision of the game had been scrapped.

Aoki ultimately produced Chrono Trigger, while director credits were attributed to Akihiko Matsui, Yoshinori Kitase and Takashi Tokita. Toriyama designed the game's aesthetic, including characters, monsters, vehicles, and the look of each era. Masato Kato also contributed character ideas and designs. Kato planned to feature Gaspar as a playable character and Toriyama sketched him, but he was cut early in development. The development staff studied the drawings of Toriyama to approximate his style. Sakaguchi and Horii supervised; Sakaguchi was responsible for the game's overall system and contributed several monster ideas. Other notable designers include Tetsuya Takahashi, the graphic director, and Yasuyuki Honne, Tetsuya Nomura, and Yusuke Naora, who worked as field graphic artists. Yasuhiko Kamata programmed graphics, and cited Ridley Scott's visual work in the film Alien as an inspiration for the game's lighting. Kamata made the game's luminosity and color choice lay between that of Secret of Mana and the Final Fantasy series. Features originally intended to be used in Secret of Mana or Final Fantasy IV, also under development at the same time, were appropriated by the Chrono Trigger team. According to Tanaka, Secret of Mana (which itself was originally intended to be Final Fantasy IV) was codenamed "Chrono Trigger" during development before being called Seiken Densetsu 2 (Secret of Mana), and then the name Chrono Trigger was adopted for a new project. After its release, the development team of Final Fantasy VI was folded into the Chrono Trigger team.

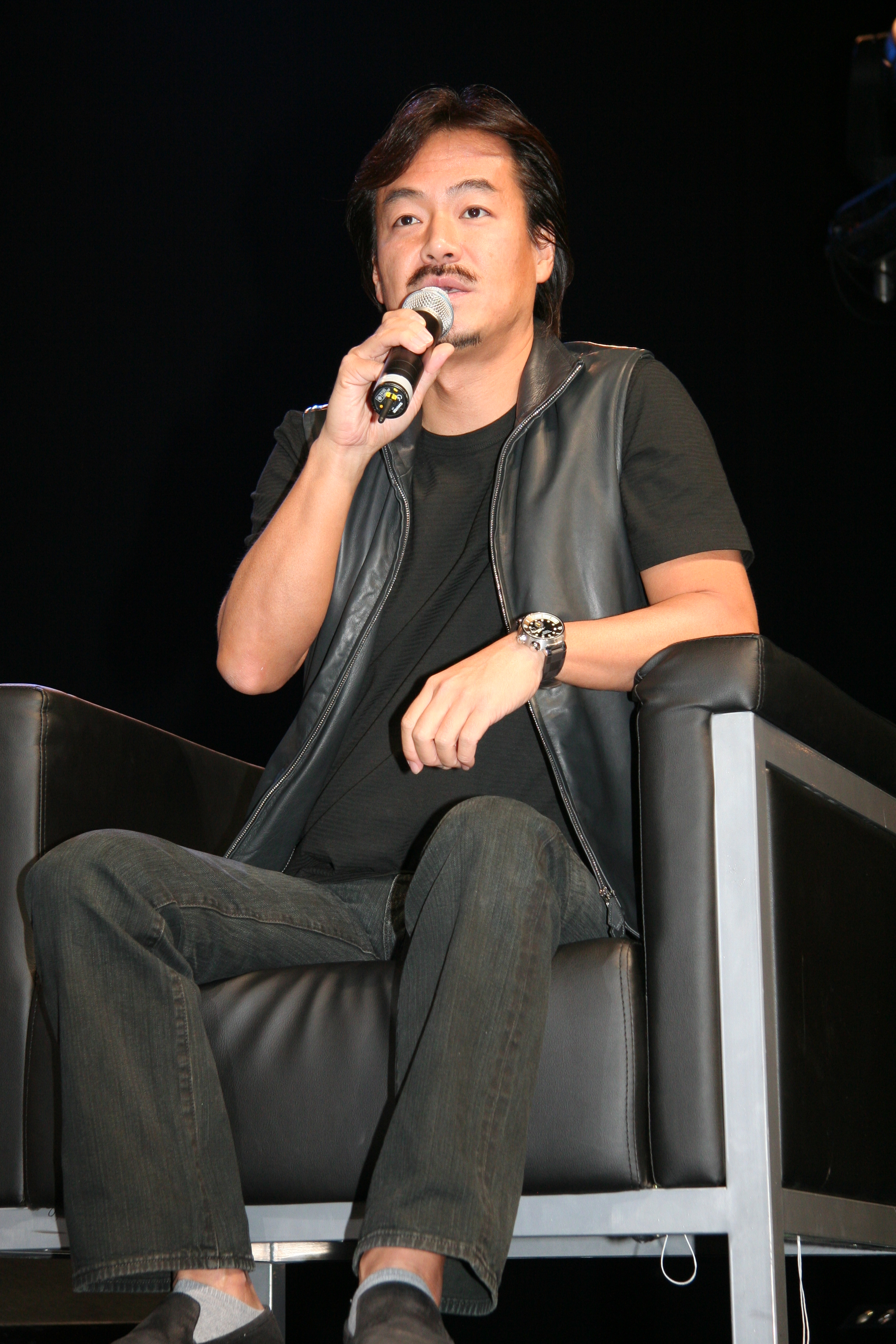
Hironobu Sakaguchi, part of the "Dream Team"

Yuji Horii, a fan of time travel fiction (such as the TV series The Time Tunnel), fostered a theme of time travel in his general story outline of Chrono Trigger with input from Akira Toriyama. Horii liked the scenario of the grandfather paradox surrounding Marle. Concerning story planning, Horii commented, "If there's a fairground, I just write that there's a fairground; I don't write down any of the details. Then the staff brainstorm and come up with a variety of attractions to put in." Horii also devised Lavos as the final boss, having wanted the final boss to be an ancient evil. Sakaguchi contributed some minor elements, including the character Gato; he liked Marle's drama and reconciliation with her father. Masato Kato subsequently edited and completed the outline by writing the majority of the game's story, including all the events of the 12,000 BC era. He took pains to avoid what he described as "a long string of errands [...] [such as] 'do this', 'take this', 'defeat these monsters', or 'plant this flag'." Kato and other developers held a series of meetings to ensure continuity, usually attended by around 30 personnel. Kato and Horii initially proposed Crono's death, though they intended he stay dead; the party would have retrieved an earlier, living version of him to complete the quest. Square deemed the scenario too depressing and asked that Crono be brought back to life later in the story. Kato also devised the system of multiple endings because he could not branch the story out to different paths. Yoshinori Kitase and Takashi Tokita then wrote various subplots. They also devised an "Active Time Event Logic" system, "where you can move your character around during scenes, even when an NPC is talking to you", and with players "talking to different people and steering the conversation in different directions", allowing each scene to "have many permutations." Kato became friends with composer Yasunori Mitsuda during development, and they would collaborate on several future projects. Katsuhisa Higuchi programmed the battle system, which hosted combat on the map without transition to a special battleground as most previous Square games had done. Higuchi noted extreme difficulty in loading battles properly without slow-downs or a brief, black loading screen. The game's use of animated monster sprites consumed much more memory than previous Final Fantasy games, which used static enemy graphics.

Hironobu Sakaguchi likened the development of Chrono Trigger to "play[ing] around with Toriyama's universe," citing the inclusion of humorous sequences in the game that would have been "impossible with something like Final Fantasy." When Square suggested a non-human player character, developers created Frog by adapting one of Toriyama's sketches. The team created the End of Time to help players with hints, worrying that they might become stuck and need to consult a walkthrough. The game's testers had previously complained that Chrono Trigger was too difficult; as Horii explained, "It's because we know too much. The developers think the game's just right; that they're being too soft. They're thinking from their own experience. The puzzles were the same. Lots of players didn't figure out things we thought they'd get easily." Sakaguchi later cited the unusual desire of beta testers to play the game a second time or "travel through time again" as an affirmation of the New Game Plus feature: "Wherever we could, we tried to make it so that a slight change in your behavior caused subtle differences in people's reactions, even down to the smallest details [...] I think the second playthrough will hold a whole new interest." The game's reuse of locations due to time traveling made bug-fixing difficult, as corrections would cause unintended consequences in other eras.

=== Music ===
Music samples:
"Chrono Trigger"
A 30-second sample of the game's main theme, illustrating Chrono Trigger's aural style and aesthetic.

"Zeal Palace"
A 30-second sample of "Zeal Palace" from The Brink of Time, demonstrating the acid-jazz style of the arranged album.

Chrono Trigger was scored primarily by Yasunori Mitsuda, with contributions from veteran Final Fantasy composer Nobuo Uematsu and one track by Noriko Matsueda. A sound programmer at the time, Mitsuda was unhappy with his pay and threatened to leave Square if he could not compose music. Hironobu Sakaguchi suggested he score Chrono Trigger, remarking, "maybe your salary will go up." Mitsuda composed new music and drew on a personal collection of pieces composed over the previous two years. He reflected, "I wanted to create music that wouldn't fit into any established genre [...] music of an imaginary world. The game's director, Masato Kato, was my close friend, and so I'd always talk with him about the setting and the scene before going into writing." Mitsuda slept in his studio several nights, and attributed certain pieces—such as the game's ending theme, "To Far Away Times"—to inspiring dreams. He later attributed this song to an idea he was developing before Chrono Trigger, reflecting that the tune was made in dedication to "a certain person with whom [he] wanted to share a generation". He also tried to use leitmotifs of the Chrono Trigger main theme to create a sense of consistency in the soundtrack. Mitsuda wrote each tune to be around two minutes long before repeating, unusual for Square's games at the time. Mitsuda suffered a hard drive crash that lost around forty in-progress tracks. After Mitsuda contracted stomach ulcers, Uematsu joined the project to compose ten pieces and finish the score. Mitsuda returned to watch the ending with the staff before the game's release, crying upon seeing the finished scene.

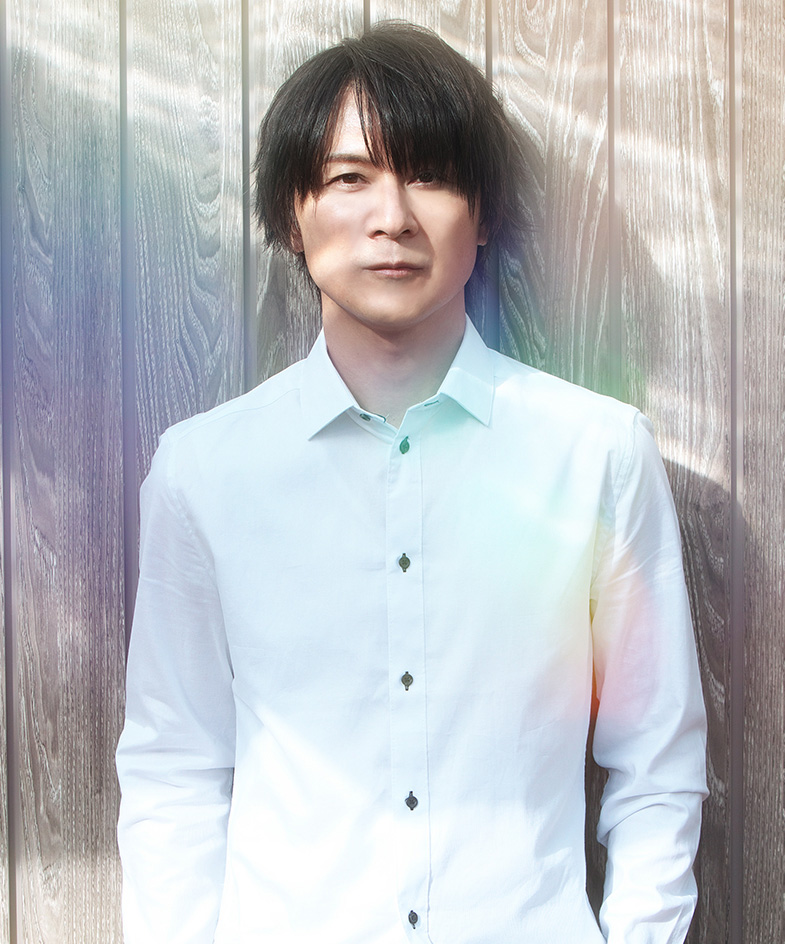
Yasunori Mitsuda composed the bulk of the music for Chrono Trigger and would later serve as composer for Chrono Cross.

At the time of the game's release, the number of tracks and sound effects was unprecedented—the soundtrack spanned three discs in its 1995 commercial pressing. Square also released a one-disc acid jazz arrangement called The Brink of Time by Guido that year. The Brink of Time came about because Mitsuda wanted to do something that no one else was doing, and he noted that acid jazz and its related genres were uncommon in the Japanese market. Mitsuda considers Chrono Trigger a landmark game which helped mature his talent. While Mitsuda later held that the title piece was "rough around the edges", he maintains that it had "significant influence on [his] life as a composer". In 1999, Square produced another one-disc soundtrack to complement the PlayStation release of the game, featuring orchestral tracks used in cutscenes. Tsuyoshi Sekito composed four new pieces for the game's bonus features which weren't included on the soundtrack. Some fans were displeased by Mitsuda's absence in creating the port, whose instruments sometimes aurally differed from the original game's. Mitsuda arranged versions of music from the Chrono series for Play! video game music concerts, presenting the main theme, "Frog's Theme", and "To Far Away Times". He worked with Square Enix to ensure that the music for the Nintendo DS would sound closer to the Super NES version. Mitsuda encouraged feedback about the game's soundtrack from contemporary children (who he thought would expect "full symphonic scores blaring out of the speakers"). Fans who preordered the DS version received a special music disc containing two orchestral arrangements of the game's music directed by Natsumi Kameoka; Square Enix also held a random prize drawing for two signed copies of Chrono Trigger sheet music. Mitsuda expressed difficulty in selecting the tune for the orchestral medley, eventually picking a tune from each era and certain character themes. Mitsuda later wrote:

I feel that the way we interact with music has changed greatly in the last 13 years, even for me. For better or for worse, I think it would be extremely difficult to create something as "powerful" as I did 13 years ago today. But instead, all that I have learned in these 13 years allows me to compose something much more intricate. To be perfectly honest, I find it so hard to believe that songs from 13 years ago are loved this much. Keeping these feelings in mind, I hope to continue composing songs which are powerful, and yet intricate...I hope that the extras like this bonus CD will help expand the world of Chrono Trigger, especially since we did a live recording. I hope there's another opportunity to release an album of this sort one day.

Music from the game was performed live by the Tokyo Symphony Orchestra in 1996 at the Orchestral Game Concert in Tokyo, Japan. A suite of music including Chrono Trigger is a part of the symphonic world-tour with video game music Play! A Video Game Symphony, where Mitsuda was in attendance for the concert's world-premiere in Chicago on May 27, 2006. His suite of Chrono music, comprising "Reminiscence", "Chrono Trigger", "Chrono Cross~Time's Scar", "Frog's Theme", and "To Far Away Times" was performed. Mitsuda has also appeared with the Eminence Symphony Orchestra as a special guest. Video Games Live has also featured medleys from Chrono Trigger and Chrono Cross. A medley of Music from Chrono Trigger made of one of the four suites of the "Symphonic Fantasies" concerts in September 2009 which was produced by the creators of the Symphonic Game Music Concert series, conducted by Arnie Roth. Square Enix re-released the game's soundtrack, along with a video interview with Mitsuda in July 2009. "Frog's Theme" and "Robo's Theme" were among the video game music performed during the 2020 Summer Olympics opening ceremony. In 2022, the main theme continued to feature in the setlist of the 8-Bit Big Band, led by Charlie Rosen.

== Release ==
The team planned to release Chrono Trigger in late 1994, but release was pushed back to the following year. Early alpha versions of Chrono Trigger were demonstrated at the 1994 and 1995 V Jump festivals in Japan. A few months prior to the game's release, Square shipped a beta version to magazine reviewers and game stores for review. An unfinished build of the game dated November 17, 1994, it contains unused music tracks, locations, and other features changed or removed from the final release—such as a dungeon named "Singing Mountain" and its eponymous tune. Some names are also differed; the character Soysaw (Slash in the US version) was known as Wiener, while Mayonnay (Flea in the US version) was named Ketchappa. The ROM image for this early version was eventually uploaded to the internet, prompting fans to explore and document the game's differences, including two unused world map NPC character sprites and presumed additional sprites for certain non-player characters. Around the game's release, Yuji Horii commented that Chrono Trigger "went beyond [the development team's] expectations", and Hironobu Sakaguchi congratulated the game's graphic artists and field designers. Sakaguchi intended to perfect the "sense of dancing you get from exploring Toriyama's worlds" in the event that they would make a sequel.

Chrono Trigger used a 32-megabit ROM cartridge with battery-backed RAM for saved games, lacking special on-cartridge coprocessors. The Japanese release of Chrono Trigger included art for the game's ending and running counts of items in the player's status menu. Developers created the North American version before adding these features to the original build, inadvertently leaving in vestiges of Chrono Trigger's early development (such as the piece "Singing Mountain"). Hironobu Sakaguchi asked translator Ted Woolsey to localize Chrono Trigger for English audiences and gave him roughly thirty days to work. Lacking the help of a modern translation team, he memorized scenarios and looked at drafts of commercial player's guides to put dialogue in context. Woolsey later reflected that he would have preferred 2 1/2 months, and blames his rushed schedule on the prevailing attitude in Japan that games were children's toys rather than serious works. Some of his work was cut due to space constraints, though he still considered Trigger "one of the most satisfying games [he] ever worked on or played". Nintendo of America censored certain dialogue, including references to breastfeeding, consumption of alcohol, and religion.

The original SNES edition of Chrono Trigger was released on the Wii download service Virtual Console in Japan on April 26, 2011, in the US on May 16, 2011, and in Europe on May 20, 2011. Previously in April 2008, a Nintendo Power reader poll had identified Chrono Trigger as the third-most wanted game for the Virtual Console. The game has also been ported to i-mode, the PlayStation Network, iOS, Android, and Windows.

=== PlayStation ===
Square released an enhanced port of Chrono Trigger developed by Tose in Japan for the Sony PlayStation in 1999. Square timed its release before that of Chrono Cross, the 1999 sequel to Chrono Trigger, to familiarize new players with the story leading up to it. This version included anime cutscenes created by original character designer Akira Toriyama's Bird Studio and animated at Toei Animation, as well as several bonus features, accessible after achieving various endings in the game. Scenarist Masato Kato attended planning meetings at Bird Studio to discuss how the ending cutscenes would illustrate subtle ties to Chrono Cross. The port was released in North America in 2001—along with a newly translated version of Final Fantasy IV—as Final Fantasy Chronicles. Reviewers criticized Chronicles for its lengthy load times and an absence of new in-game features. This same iteration was also re-released as a downloadable game on the PlayStation Network on October 4, 2011, for the PlayStation 3, PlayStation Vita, and PlayStation Portable.

=== Nintendo DS ===
On July 2, 2008, Square Enix announced that they were planning to bring Chrono Trigger to the Nintendo DS handheld platform. Composer Yasunori Mitsuda was pleased with the project, exclaiming "finally!" after receiving the news from Square Enix and maintaining, "it's still a very deep, very high-quality game even when you play it today. I'm very interested in seeing what kids today think about it when they play it." Square retained Masato Kato to oversee the port, and Tose to program it. Kato explained, "I wanted it to be based on the original Super NES release rather than the PlayStation version. I thought we should look at the additional elements from the PlayStation version, re-examine and re-work them to make it a complete edition. That's how it struck me and I told the staff so later on." Square Enix touted the game by displaying Akira Toriyama's original art at the 2008 Tokyo Game Show.

The DS re-release contains all of the bonus material from the PlayStation port, as well as other enhancements. The added features include a more accurate and revised translation by Tom Slattery, a dual-screen mode which clears the top screen of all menus, a self-completing map screen, and a default "run" option. It also features the option to choose between two control schemes: one mirroring the original SNES controls, and the other making use of the DS's touch screen. Masato Kato participated in development, overseeing the addition of the monster-battling Arena, two new areas, the Lost Sanctum and the Dimensional Vortex, and a new ending that further foreshadows the events of Chrono Cross. One of the areas within the Vortex uses the "Singing Mountain" song that was featured on the original Chrono Trigger soundtrack. Additionally, one of the dungeons absent from the original game was remade within the Vortex. These new dungeons met with mixed reviews; GameSpot called them "frustrating" and "repetitive", while IGN noted that "the extra quests in the game connect extremely well." It was a nominee for "Best RPG for the Nintendo DS" in IGN's 2008 video game awards. The Nintendo DS version of Chrono Trigger was the 22nd best-selling game of 2008 in Japan.

=== Mobile ===
A cellphone version was released in Japan on i-mode distribution service on August 25, 2011. An iOS version was released on December 8, 2011. This version is based on the Nintendo DS version, with graphics optimized for iOS. The game was later released for Android on October 29, 2012. An update incorporating most of the features of the Windows version—including the reintroduction of the animated cutscenes, which had been absent from the initial mobile release—was released on February 27, 2018, for both iOS and Android.

=== Windows ===
Square Enix released Chrono Trigger without an announcement for Windows via Steam on February 27, 2018. This version includes most content from the Nintendo DS port besides the arena mode, as well as the higher resolution graphics from the mobile device releases, support for mouse and keyboard controls, and autosave features, along with additional content such as wallpapers and music. The PC port initially received a negative reception due to its inferior graphical quality, additional glitches, UI adapted for touchscreens, and failure to properly adapt the control scheme for keyboards and controllers. (Note: Attributed to multiple sources:) In response, Square Enix provided various UI updates and several other improvements including adding an original graphics option based on the game's original version, fixing glitches introduced, and adding a true 16:9 widescreen presentation for the first time, to address the aforementioned complaints. In total, five major updates were released—the first on April 10, 2018, and the last on August 3, 2018—all of which have substantially improved its overall reception. (Note: Attributed to multiple sources:) On March 11, 2022, a sixth major patch was released; it added ultrawide 21:9 support and other quality of life features and improvements. (Note: Attributed to multiple sources:)

== Reception ==
Reception

Aggregate scores
Aggregator	Score		
Aggregator	DS	iOS	SNES
GameRankings	92%	N/A	96%
Metacritic	92/100	71/100	N/A

Review scores
Publication	Score		
Publication	DS	iOS	SNES
1Up.com	A	N/A	N/A
Edge	N/A	N/A	7/10
Electronic Gaming Monthly	A	N/A	9/10, 9.5/10, 9.5/10, 9/10
Eurogamer	10/10	N/A	N/A
Famitsu	N/A	N/A	8/10, 9/10, 8/10, 9/10
Game Informer	9/10	N/A	9.25/10
GamePro	5/5	N/A	20/20
GameSpot	8.5/10	N/A	N/A
GameSpy	4.5/5	N/A	N/A
GamesRadar+	5/5	N/A	N/A
IGN	8.8/10 (US); 9.1/10 (AU)	N/A	N/A
Next Generation	N/A	N/A	4/5
Nintendo Power	9/10	N/A	N/A

Awards
Publication	Award
Electronic Gaming Monthly	Best Super NES Game, Best Role-Playing Game, Best Music in a Cartridge-Based Game
GamePro	Best RPG Game
Nintendo Power Awards	Best Super NES Game, Best Epic Game, Best Story, Best Ending, Coolest Transportation (Epoch), Worst Baddie (Juggler)

=== SNES release ===
Chrono Trigger received critical acclaim upon its original SNES release. The gameplay received praise, with Nintendo Power and Next Generation considering it innovative. Both magazines and Super Play cited the visibility of enemies in the overworld map and the use of combos as reasons for their enjoyment. (Note: Attributed to multiple sources:) Both Edge and GamePro felt the game was easier than Final Fantasy VI, though GamePro enjoyed it nonetheless. The graphics and music received praise by Nintendo Power, Electronic Gaming Monthly, and Nintendo Magazine System. GamePro found them better than in prior role-playing video games such as Final Fantasy VI, and Game Informer felt the graphical upgrades shortened the quests, though Edge considered them lacking Final Fantasy VI's grandness. Evaluations of the story and characters were more mixed. The critics for Electronic Gaming Monthly generally found the storyline compelling, and Game Informer felt that the game's character arcs were well-developed. Next Generation and Super Play disagreed; they both negatively compared the character arcs to Final Fantasy VI, with Super Play finding Frog's story to be the only meaningful one.

=== Windows release ===
In contrast to the critical acclaim of Chrono Trigger's original SNES release, the 2018 Windows port of Chrono Trigger was critically panned. Grievances noted by reviewers included tiling errors on textures, the addition of aesthetically intrusive sprite filters, an unattractive GUI carried over from the 2011 mobile release, a lack of graphic customization options, and the inability to remap controls. In describing the port, Forbes commented: "From pretty awful graphical issues, such as tiling textures and quite a painful menu system, this port really doesn't do this classic game justice." USGamer characterized the Windows release as carrying "all the markings of a project farmed out to the lowest bidder. It's a shrug in Square-Enix's mind, seemingly not worth the money or effort necessary for a half-decent port." In a Twitter post detailing his experiences with the Windows version, indie developer Fred Wood derisively compared the port to "someone's first attempt at an RPG Maker game", a comment which was republished across numerous articles addressing the poor quality of the rerelease. (Note: Attributed to multiple sources:) Square Enix released six major updates to address the complaints, thus improving its overall reception; (Note: Attributed to multiple sources:) Alex Donaldson of VG247, commenting on the improvements, wrote that "Square Enix took the criticism to heart and over the course of a string of hefty patches have slowly turned this into something that actually could be argued as the best version of Chrono Trigger."

=== Sales ===
The game was a best-seller in Japan, where two million copies were sold in only two months. It ended the year as the second best-selling game of 1995 in Japan, below Dragon Quest VI: Realms of Revelation. Chrono Trigger was also met with substantial success upon release in North America, and its re-release on the PlayStation as part of the Final Fantasy Chronicles package topped the NPD TRSTS PlayStation sales charts for over six weeks. (Note: Attributed to multiple sources:) By March 2003, the game's SNES and PS1 iterations had shipped 2.65 million copies worldwide, including 2.36 million in Japan and 290,000 abroad. The PS1 version was re-released in 2003 as part of Sony's Greatest Hits line. The original SNES version had sold 2.5 million copies by 2006. Chrono Trigger DS sold 790,000 copies worldwide, as of March 2009, including 490,000 in Japan, 240,000 in North America and 60,000 in Europe. The SNES, PS1 and DS versions shipped a combined 3.44 million copies worldwide by March 2009. Excluding the PC version, the game had shipped over 3.5 million copies worldwide by February 2018. As of March 2025, all versions together have shipped more than 5 million copies worldwide.

=== Awards and accolades ===
Chrono Trigger is frequently listed among the greatest video games of all time. In 1997 Electronic Gaming Monthly ranked it the 29th best console video game of all time; while noting that it was not as good as Final Fantasy VI (which ranked 9th), they gave superlative praise to its handling of time travel and its combat engine. It has placed highly on all six of multimedia website IGN's "top 100 games of all time" lists—4th in 2002, 6th in early 2005, 13th in late 2005, 2nd in 2006, 18th in 2007, and 2nd in 2008. (Note: Attributed to multiple sources:) Game Informer called it its 15th favorite game in 2001. Its staff thought that it was the best non-Final Fantasy game Square had produced at the time. GameSpot included Chrono Trigger in "The Greatest Games of All Time" list released in April 2006, and it also appeared as 28th on an "All Time Top 100" list in a poll conducted by Japanese magazine Famitsu the same year. In 2004, Chrono Trigger finished runner up to Final Fantasy VII in the inaugural GameFAQs video game battle. In 2008, readers of Dengeki Online voted it the eighth best game ever made. Nintendo Power's twentieth anniversary issue named it the fifth best Super NES game. In 2009, Official Nintendo Magazine ranked the DS version of the game 31st on a list of greatest Nintendo games. In 2012, it came 32nd place on GamesRadar's "100 best games of all time" list, and 1st place on its "Best JRPGs" list. GamesRadar named Chrono Trigger the 2nd best Super NES game of all time, behind Super Metroid. In 2023, Time Extension included the game on their "Best JRPGs of All Time" list.

== Legacy ==
=== Add-ons ===
Chrono Trigger inspired several related releases; the first were three games released for the Satellaview on July 31, 1995. They included Chrono Trigger: Jet Bike Special, a racing video game based on a minigame from the original; Chrono Trigger: Character Library, featuring profiles on characters and monsters from the game; and Chrono Trigger: Music Library, a collection of music from the game's soundtrack. The contents of Character Library and Music Library were later included as extras in the PlayStation rerelease of Chrono Trigger. Production I.G created a 16-minute OVA, Dimensional Adventure Numa Monjar, which was shown at the Japanese V Jump festival of July 31, 1996.

=== Fangames ===
There have been two notable attempts by Chrono Trigger fans to unofficially remake parts of the game for PC with a 3D graphics engine. Chrono Resurrection, an attempt at remaking ten small interactive cutscenes from Chrono Trigger, and Chrono Trigger Remake Project, which sought to remake the entire game, were forcibly terminated by Square Enix by way of a cease and desist order. (Note: Attributed to multiple sources:) Another group of fans created a sequel via a ROM hack of Chrono Trigger called Chrono Trigger: Crimson Echoes; developed from 2004 to 2009; although feature-length and virtually finished, it also was terminated through a cease & desist letter days before its May 2009 release. The letter also forbade the dissemination of existing Chrono Trigger ROM hacks and documentation. After the cease and desist was issued, an incomplete version of the game was leaked in May 2009, though due to the early state of the game, playability was limited. This was followed by a more complete ROM leak in January 2011, which allowed the game to be played from beginning to end.

=== Sequels ===
Square released a related Satellaview game in 1996, named Radical Dreamers. Having thought that Trigger ended with "unfinished business", scenarist Masato Kato wrote and directed the game. Dreamers functioned as a side story to Chrono Trigger, resolving a loose subplot from its predecessor. A short, text-based game relying on minimal graphics and atmospheric music, the game never received an official release outside Japan—though it was translated by fans to English in April 2003. Square planned to release Radical Dreamers as an easter egg in the PlayStation edition of Chrono Trigger, but Kato was unhappy with his work and halted its inclusion.

Square released Chrono Cross for the Sony PlayStation in 1999. Cross is a sequel to Chrono Trigger featuring a new setting and cast of characters. Presenting a theme of parallel worlds, the story followed the protagonist Serge—a teenage boy thrust into an alternate reality in which he died years earlier. With the help of a thief named Kid, Serge endeavors to discover the truth behind his apparent death and obtain the Frozen Flame, a mythical artifact. Regarded by writer and director Masato Kato as an effort to "redo Radical Dreamers properly", Chrono Cross borrowed certain themes, scenarios, characters, and settings from Dreamers. Yasunori Mitsuda also adapted certain songs from Radical Dreamers while scoring Cross. Radical Dreamers was consequently removed from the series' main continuity, considered an alternate dimension. Chrono Cross shipped 1.5 million copies and was widely praised by critics. (Note: Attributed to multiple sources:)

There are no plans as of 2025 for a new title, despite a statement from Hironobu Sakaguchi in 2001 that the developers of Chrono Cross wanted to make a new Chrono game. The same year, Square applied for a trademark for the names Chrono Break in the United States and Chrono Brake in Japan. However, the United States trademark was dropped in 2003. Director Takashi Tokita mentioned "Chrono Trigger 2" in a 2003 interview which has not been translated to English. Yuji Horii expressed no interest in returning to the Chrono franchise in 2005, while Hironobu Sakaguchi remarked in April 2007 that his creation Blue Dragon was an "extension of [Chrono Trigger]." During a Cubed³ interview on February 1, 2007, Square Enix's Senior Vice President Hiromichi Tanaka said that although no sequel is currently planned, some sort of sequel is still possible if the Chrono Cross developers can be reunited. Yasunori Mitsuda has expressed interest in scoring a new game, but warned that "there are a lot of politics involved" with the series. He stressed that Masato Kato should participate in development. The February 2008 issue of Game Informer ranked the Chrono series eighth among the "Top Ten Sequels in Demand", naming the games "steadfast legacies in the Square Enix catalogue" and asking, "what's the damn holdup?!" In Electronic Gaming Monthly's June 2008 "Retro Issue", writer Jeremy Parish cited Chrono as the franchise video game fans would be most thrilled to see a sequel to. In the first May Famitsu of 2009, Chrono Trigger placed 14th out of 50 in a vote of most-wanted sequels by the magazine's readers. At E3 2009, SE Senior Vice President Shinji Hashimoto remarked, "If people want a sequel, they should buy more!"

In July 2010, Obsidian Entertainment designer Feargus Urquhart, replying to an interview question about what franchises he would like to work on, said that "if [he] could come across everything that [he] played", he would choose a Chrono Trigger game. At the time, Obsidian was making Dungeon Siege III for Square Enix. Urquhart said: "You make RPGs, we make RPGs, it would be great to see what we could do together. And they really wanted to start getting into Western RPGs. And, so it kind of all ended up fitting together." Yoshinori Kitase stated that he used the time travel mechanics of Chrono Trigger as a starting point for that of Final Fantasy XIII-2.
