= Akihiko Matsui =

Japanese video game developer

Akihiko Matsui (松井 聡彦, Matsui Akihiko) is a Japanese video game developer and battle designer working for Square Enix. He was one of the directors for Chrono Trigger and worked on several battle systems for the Final Fantasy series.

== Career ==
After finishing his work on Romancing SaGa 2, Matsui joined the development of Chrono Trigger midway through. He was responsible for planning and the movements of monsters in battles. Since 2000, Matsui has been a member of the production staff for the MMORPG Final Fantasy XI, where he was in charge of the battle system. He became the director of the game's ongoing development in September 2010 but was succeeded by Mizuki Ito two months later. Matsui was switched to the Final Fantasy XIV team as lead combat system designer following the game's unsuccessful launch.

When Final Fantasy XI producer Hiromichi Tanaka left the company in August 2012, Matsui was chosen to fill the position in his place. In March 2023, Yoji Fujito replaced Matsui, who would in some form continue supporting Final Fantasy XI.

== Works ==
Release	Title	System	Credit(s)
1991	Final Fantasy IV	Super Nintendo Entertainment System	Battle designer
1992	Final Fantasy V	Super Nintendo Entertainment System	Battle planner
1993	Romancing SaGa 2	Super Nintendo Entertainment System	Map developer, map data developer
1995	Chrono Trigger	Super Nintendo Entertainment System	Director
1996	Koi wa Baransu Tatoeba K-kun no Tabou na Ichinichi-hen	Satellaview	Game designer
1997	SaGa Frontier	PlayStation	Game data developer
1999	Legend of Mana	PlayStation	Game designer, system design chief
2002	Final Fantasy XI	PlayStation 2, Windows	Battle data designer, battle director, director (2010), producer (2012 – 2023)
2013	Final Fantasy XIV: A Realm Reborn	PlayStation 3, PlayStation 4, Windows	Lead combat system designer
2024	SaGa: Emerald Beyond	Android, iOS, Nintendo Switch, PlayStation 4, PlayStation 5, Windows	Assistant Director
