= New Game Plus =

Unlockable video game mode in some games

New Game Plus, also known as New Game+, NG+, or hero mode, is an unlockable video game mode available in some video game titles that allows the player to restart the game's story with all or some of the items or experience gained in the first playthrough. New Game Plus modes are typically unlocked after completing the game's story at least once and sometimes contain certain features not normally available in the initial playthrough, such as increased difficulty, altered combat or encounters, and more.

== Origin ==
The term was coined in the 1995 role-playing video game Chrono Trigger, but examples can be found in earlier games, such as Digital Devil Story: Megami Tensei, The Legend of Zelda and Ghosts 'n Goblins. This play mode is most often found in role-playing video games, where starting a New Game Plus will usually have the player characters start the new game with the statistics and equipment with which they ended the last game. Key items that are related to the story are normally removed so they cannot ruin the game's progression, and are given back to the player at the time they are needed; likewise, characters that the player acquires throughout the story will also not appear until their scheduled place and time, but will get the enhanced stats from the previous playthrough.

== Examples ==
Games with multiple endings, such as Chrono Trigger, may feature a New Game Plus mode which allows the player to explore alternate endings. Many games increase the difficulty in a New Game Plus mode, such as those in the Mega Man Battle Network series and Borderlands series. Others use the feature to advance the plot. In Astro Boy: Omega Factor, the player uses the game's Stage Select mechanism, explained in-story as a form of time travel, to avert disaster, while in Eternal Darkness, the player defeats three different final bosses, one in each playthrough, to access the true ending.

Some New Game Plus variations alter established gameplay. This includes unlocking new characters, such as in Castlevania: Symphony of the Night; new areas, such as in Parasite Eve; new items, such as in the Metal Gear series; new challenges, such as in the .hack series, or new weapon and armor upgrades, like in God of War II's Bonus Mode and God of War's New Game+ mode.

Games that connect to online marketplaces may require the player to complete a New Game Plus game to obtain certain achievements, such as the "Calamity Kid" achievement in the game Bastion. Others may require or be required by additional purchases in the form of downloadable content, such as in Yakuza: Like a Dragon.

Final Fantasy XIV is a MMORPG with an extensive story line called the "main scenario quest" or colloquially the "MSQ". A New Game Plus option was introduced during the Shadowbringers expansion patch cycle, which allows players to replay the main scenario and selected other scenarios, either in their entirety or specific expansion's stories.

== See also ==
- Incremental games
- Eternal return
