= Subplot =

Secondary strand of a narrative plot

In fiction, a subplot or side story is a strand of the plot that is a supporting side story for any story or for the main plot. Subplots may connect to main plots, in either time and place or thematic significance. Subplots often involve supporting characters, those besides the protagonist or antagonist. Subplots may also intertwine with the main plot at some point in a story.

== Function and characteristics ==
Subplots are distinguished from the main plot by taking up less of the action, having fewer significant events occur, with less impact on the "world" of the work, and occurring to less important characters.

== Examples ==
An example of a subplot interacting with a main plot can be found in the TV series Mr. Robot (season 1). One of the main plots followed the hacker ring known as F-society, led by Elliot Alderson, in which they intended to perform a massive hack against the conglomerate Evil Corp; they were executing this hack through a partnership with another hack-ring known as The Dark Army. A subplot emerged around the character development of Elliot's childhood friend and love interest Angela Moss, in which she evolved from a brow-beaten assistant at cybersecurity firm Allsafe into a powerbroker at Evil Corp through first leading a massive lawsuit against them.

During an early point of this subplot, Angela Moss is blackmailed by The Dark Army into installing spyware (surveillance malware) into an Allsafe computer (the cybersecurity firm responsible for protecting Evil Corp). The result of her action in this subplot ended up affecting the main plot when F-society was ready to initiate the hack against Evil Corp. The Dark Army decided to back out from participating in the hack because of information they learned as a result of Angela Moss installing the spyware. Without The Dark Army's support, F-society was unable to initiate the hack and had to realign their strategy, thus introducing a new obstacle in the main plot that had to be overcome. Throughout the story, her subplot repeatedly affected this main plot.

== In screenwriting ==
In screenwriting, a subplot is referred to as a "B story" while the main plot point can be referred to as the "A story".
