= Crono =

- Chrono character
- Crono as designed by Akira Toriyama
- First game: Chrono Trigger
- Created by: Masato Kato
- Designed by: Akira Toriyama

Crono, known as Chrono (Japanese: クロノ, Hepburn: Kurono) in Japan, is a fictional character in the Chrono series of video games by Square and the series' namesake. He has appeared in two games, starring as the protagonist in the 1995 role-playing game Chrono Trigger and Chrono Cross, where he makes a brief appearance. Crono is a silent swordsman protagonist who uses facial expressions to communicate. During a party in his hometown, Crono finds himself on a quest to protect Princess Marle. Though he is successful, the main character finds himself on a major quest to protect the world from a giant creature known as Lavos that will destroy the world in the future. Reunited with Marle and new allies, Crono goes on multiple quests to save the world.

Crono's design was originally created by Chrono Trigger's story planner, Masato Kato, and finalized by Akira Toriyama. While his design did not change much throughout the game's development, Kato's idea to kill the protagonist resulted in negative feedback from Square higher-ups for being too dark for the story, and thus Crono became able to revive. Since his appearance in Chrono Trigger, Crono has received generally positive reception and has gained a strong fan following. He has been praised as a likable blank canvas for the player to project themselves onto, and his death scene in Chrono Trigger is considered by critics to be one of gaming's most memorable moments.

== Concept and creation ==
Crono's initial design was created by Chrono Trigger's story planner, Masato Kato. The hero retained his "innocence": His hairstyle, clothing, the Japanese sword he wields gave an image that stayed the same since the game's development. The only difference was that his expression belies his youth in sketches. His crimson hair is a symbol for his blazing courage. The concept behind Crono was that his adventure begins when he goes to save a girl who was sucked into a time warp created by a teleportation device. Despite the simplicity of such a quest, it gradually reveals itself as you travel through time to each different era, far surpassing the story's creation. The adventure Crono embarks on while time-traveling was the key appeal to the audience. His design was meant to be highly notable in order to make fights more entertaining. Crono was the first written character to star as a young male, resulting in Square balancing it by adding female characters as well as non-human characters to balance it and make the party more entertaining. Crono's most developed parts are his Japanese blade, which gives a hint of the Orient.

Crono's final design was created by Akira Toriyama. In the initial design sketches, Crono was a "bad kid" wearing goggles and a cape. While he was called Chrono in the Japanese version, this was changed in the North American version. Crono is a silent protagonist who uses facial expressions to communicate; this is never addressed by any characters in the games he appears in. Concerning his death in the game, Kato noted that his policy has always been "to try and create games that run counter to users' expectations, surprise them." Chrono was his name originally, but it lost the "h" due to problems with memory and the names. Chrono had six letters, while five appeared to be the limit.

Masato Kato and other developers held a series of meetings to ensure continuity, usually attended by around 30 personnel. Kato and Yuji Horii initially proposed Crono's death, though they intended for him to stay dead; the party would have retrieved an earlier, living version of him to complete the quest. Square deemed the scenario too depressing and asked that Crono be brought back to life later in the story. Although Crono does not appear in the sequel, the staff has often been asked about what happens to the character. Taking into consideration the fall of the Kingdom of Guardia and the rise of Porre's militarism on the main continent, Kato suggested the couple might have been involved in an incident. When discussing a theoretical game to follow Chrono Cross, Katō discussed an idea where Kid, Lucca's adopted daughter, went on a quest to save her, Crono, and Marle. He ultimately rejected this idea due to his principle that "the past is the past".

== Appearances ==
Crono is the spiky-haired, silent protagonist of the Chrono Trigger. He originates from the year 1000 A.D., where he lives in the village of Truce with his mother. While attending the Millennial Fair, he meets a young girl named Marle, and the two go see a teleporter created by Crono's friend Lucca. As Marle tries the teleporter, it reacts with her pendant and creates a time gate, leading Crono to travel back in time 400 years to rescue Marle. This begins a series of time-traveling adventures where Crono and his friends discover that Lavos, an extraterrestrial monster who crashed on Earth in pre-historic times, is set to awaken in 1999 A.D. and destroy civilization. Crono is tried and arrested on charges of kidnapping Marle, and sentenced to death by the current chancellor of Guardia. Lucca and Marle help Crono escape prison, haphazardly using another time portal to evade their pursuers. This portal lands them in 2300 A.D., where they learn that an advanced civilization has been wiped out by a giant creature known as Lavos that appeared in 1999 A.D., and find the last remnants of humanity living in undergrowth domes subsisting off of machine energy in place of food. The three vow to find a way to prevent the future destruction of their world. After meeting and repairing Robo, Crono and his friends find Gaspar, an old sage residing in an atemporal space known as the End of Time, who offers them the ability to travel through time by way of several pillars of light.

The ruined Ocean Palace then rises into the air as the Black Omen, Queen Zeal's floating fortress. The group turns to Gaspar for help, and he gives them a "Chrono Trigger", a device that allows the group to replace Crono just before the moment of death with an identical doppelgänger. The party then gathers power by helping people across time with Gaspar's instructions. Their journeys involve defeating the remnants of the Mystics, stopping Robo's maniacal AI creator, giving Frog closure for Cyrus's death, locating and charging up the mythical Sun Stone, retrieving the legendary Rainbow Shell, unmasking Guardia's Chancellor as a saboteur, and restoring a forest destroyed by a desert monster. If Crono is resurrected before defeating Lavos, his sentence for kidnapping Marle is revoked by her father, King Guardia XXXIII, thanks to testimonies from Marle's ancestors and descendants, whom Crono had helped during his journey. Crono's mother accidentally enters the time gate at the Millennial Fair before it closes, prompting Crono to set out in the Epoch to find her. If Crono is not resurrected, Gaspar knows how to resurrect Crono; If resurrected, Crono jumps on to help the group.

Chrono Trigger DS adds a scenario in which Crono and his friends can help a "lost sanctum" of Reptites. The second scenario adds ties to Trigger's sequel, Chrono Cross where they have a limited role as ghosts. The group can explore several temporal distortions to combat shadow versions of Crono, Marle, and Lucca and to fight Dalton, who promises in defeat to raise an army in the town of Porre to destroy the Kingdom of Guardia.

== Reception ==
Since his appearance in Chrono Trigger, Crono has received generally positive reception and has gained a strong fan following. In a special Chrono Trigger Cross Review, Famicom Tsūshin scored Crono a 30 out of 40. GamesRadar's staff ranked Crono as the 21st best hero in video games; they claimed that while he seemed like a typical hero from a role-playing game, he makes a large impact on the characters around him. They also praised the game's narrative for Crono's quality as a lead character. Crono has also been called a likable "everyman" by IGN's Jesse Schedeen and GamesRadar's Matt Bradford. Bradford claimed that while Crono did have some advantages, he took on the role of a hero without them. Crono has been referenced by a character in the NBC TV show Heroes. The character Hiro Nakamura compared himself to Crono due to his newly acquired time-travel ability. Super Retro Squad developer Jay Pavlina wanted to feature a character based on Crono in the game but never got around to it. Crono has proven to be a popular choice for an appearance in the Super Smash Bros. series by IGN and IGN's readers alike, as well as GamesRadar. Due to the character's silent personality and lack of friends, VentureBeat said Crono comes across as a common archetype of lonely role-playing protagonists who tend to spend most of their time recruiting new allies, most of whom happen to be attractive women. According to the same site, Crono is a common Akira Toriyama RPG hero, attributing his silent personality and spiky hair, which make him look more like Dragon Quest heroes as well as Goku, the protagonist of Dragon Ball. In retrospect, Alexander Pan from IGN saw Crono's games at a festival while finding new people, which was one of the most nostalgic things he did as a teenager. He also liked Crono's design, as it reminded him of Toriyama's Goku. Comic Book Resources lamented the fact that the character was silent and believed he would be more appealing if he were given lines due to the large number of friends and enemies he possesses as well as his special techniques. Should Chrono Trigger get a sequel, GameRadar demanded that in such an installment, the child of Crono and Marle be playable alongside his parents.

The character's death scene is considered one of gaming's most memorable moments by critics. IGN called it "unforgettable" and felt that killing off the main character of a video game was both "brave and rare." They added that anyone who experienced this felt a "sting in their heart" when they thought about it. UGO Networks' K. Thor Jensen felt that in a genre notable for having plot twists, this was one of the most significant examples. In another article, IGN felt this moment was sudden for the audience as the game had yet to reach its ending and it was rare for games to do this to their protagonists. The possibility of reviving Crono was still praised for making the game more complex. 1UP.com's Justin Haywald called his death the most memorable element of Chrono Trigger, which he identifies as one of his favorites. While acknowledging the shock of Crono's death, IGN said his resurrection seems obligatory for the player due to the feeling of emptiness and loss caused by the literal absence of the main hero. This adds a bittersweet and familiar taste to an already very emotional and universal experience. 1UP.com's Scott Sharkey featured him in a list of the 10 video game deaths that "didn't stick." Game Informer's Kyle Hilliard called his death the game's biggest surprise, due to the fact that you can beat the game without reviving him. Game Informer's Dan Rykert commented that while Crono was supposed to be "wish-fulfillment" for players due to his silence, his death contradicted that idea. Among the game's endings, VG247 found it weird how in one of them Crono becomes the new Magus, while in a surprisingly shocking ending, Crono stops being a silent character and talks to his comrades for the first time ever. In Playable Tragedy: Ergodic Tragedy in Chrono Trigger, Luis Felipe Torres Meza discusses that Crono's death is a well-executed fictional tragedy based on the notable loss the player suffers, especially because the dead character acts as an avatar for him. The writer further compared the tragedy in Chrono Trigger with the 1997 video game Final Fantasy VII, where the player suffers tragedy upon Cloud Strife's failure to save his comrade Aerith Gainsborough from the villain Sephiroth. Both scenes were compared for being highly engaging to the player, though Crono's death still comes across as a death that no gamer had seen coming, as referenced by the writers from the Square who wanted to surprise the audience. However, in the case of the story of Chrono Trigger, Crono's death is overshadowed by Lucca's actions in the next sequences before the player ends the game, among other side quests involving the main cast.

In the book Reverse Design: Chrono Trigger, Crono is described as an exceptional protagonist as he is both a player avatar as well as a hero destined to face the villain Lavos, as the resolution of such a battle does not affect the player highly based on how many sidequests he or she has accomplished. Nevertheless, the handling of Crono in the early parts of the game was praised for being able to fight alone by the video game developers or be assisted depending on the player's decisions. The death of Crono is also analyzed in the book Japanese Role-Playing Games: Genre, Representation, and Liminality in the JRPG, as the impact is also notable due to him being the most powerful member of the party who was always available. While his death was not unique in gaming history, the gameplay changed forever. Although his return is optional, the narrative is not affected by this, as the plot now relies more on the entire party than mainly Crono.
