= Chrono (series) =

Video game series

- Genre: Role-playing
- Developers: Square; Square Enix
- Publishers: Square; Square Enix
- Composer: Yasunori Mitsuda
- Platforms: Super NES, PlayStation, Nintendo DS, iOS, Android, Windows, Nintendo Switch, PlayStation 4, Xbox One
- First release: Chrono Trigger; March 11, 1995
- Latest release: Chrono Cross; November 18, 1999

The Chrono (Japanese: クロノ, Hepburn: Kurono) series is a video game franchise developed and published by Square, and is currently owned by Square Enix. The series began in 1995 with the time travel role-playing video game Chrono Trigger, which spawned two continuations, Radical Dreamers: Nusumenai Hōseki, and Chrono Cross. A promotional anime called Dimensional Adventure Numa Monjar and two ports of Chrono Trigger were also produced. As of March 31, 2003, Chrono Trigger was Square Enix's 12th best-selling game, with 2.65 million units shipped. Chrono Cross was the 24th, with 1.5 million units shipped. By 2019, the two games had sold over 5.5 million units combined. The games in the series have been called some of the greatest of all time, with most of the praise going towards Chrono Trigger. The series' original soundtracks, composed by Yasunori Mitsuda, have also been praised, with multiple soundtracks being released for them.

== Concept and creation ==
Chrono Trigger was produced in 1995 by Kazuhiko Aoki and directed by Akihiko Matsui, Yoshinori Kitase and Takashi Tokita. The development of the game was dubbed the "Dream Project", because it was headed by a "Dream Team" composed of supervisor Hironobu Sakaguchi, of Final Fantasy fame, as well as freelance supervisor Yuji Horii and character designer Akira Toriyama, both of Dragon Quest fame. Yuuji Horii worked on the general outline of the story; as a fan of time travel fictions, such as the TV series The Time Tunnel, he focused on a theme of time travel for Chrono Trigger. The outline was then finalized by story planner and script writer Masato Kato.

In 1996, Masato Kato and several other members of the Chrono Trigger staff worked on a minor project for the Super Famicom Satellaview extension, titled Radical Dreamers: Nusumenai Hōseki. Initially, the game was intended to be a short, original text-based adventure developed in three months with almost no planning. Nevertheless, by the end of the development, Masato Kato had connected the game's plot and characters to Chrono Trigger, turning it into a side story. Since the platform of the game was not mainstream, the connections were however left blurred on purpose and were not advertised on the game's release.

In 1999, a continuation of Chrono Trigger, titled Chrono Cross, was announced. Although the "Dream Team" members did not participate in Chrono Cross, the game was developed mostly by the same staff as the first installment. In terms of basic system and gameplay, producer Hiromichi Tanaka made it clear that the new installment was not a sequel to Chrono Trigger; rather, the game designers' approach was to make the "gameplay evolve with the hardware", creating a completely new game while restructuring the former style so as to maximize the performance of the console. The gameplay focuses on the theme of parallel worlds rather than time travel, although the latter is still deeply involved in the game's plot. In terms of storyline, Chrono Cross was described by director and scenario writer Masato Kato as "not a Chrono Trigger 2", but "a result of a pulled trigger", "another Chrono".

== Games ==
=== Chrono Trigger ===
Chrono Trigger is a role-playing video game which was released on the Super Nintendo Entertainment System on March 11, 1995, in Japan and on August 22 in North America. The game's story follows a group of young adventurers led by Crono, who are accidentally transported through time and learn that the world will be destroyed in the distant future. Vowing to prevent this disaster, they travel throughout history to discover the means to save the planet. It is regarded by critics as one of the greatest games of all time. Chrono Trigger was ported to the PlayStation in 1999 as a standalone title in Japan and in 2001 as part of the Final Fantasy Chronicles compilation in North America. An enhanced port was released for the Nintendo DS handheld platform on November 20, 2008. which itself was later released on iOS in 2011, Android in 2012, and on PC via Steam on February 27, 2018.

Additionally, three Chrono Trigger related applications were released for the Super Famicom's Broadcast Satellaview extension the same year: Character Library, a database featuring profiles on characters and monsters from the game, Jet Bike Special, a racing game based on a minigame from the original, and Music Library, a collection of music from the game's soundtrack. The contents of Character Library and Music Library were later included as extras in the PlayStation re-release of Chrono Trigger.

=== Radical Dreamers ===
Radical Dreamers: Nusumenai Hōseki (literally "The Jewel That Cannot Be Stolen") is a Japanese-exclusive text-based game released in 1996 through the Super Famicom Satellaview extension. The player takes on the role of Serge, a young adventurer accompanied by Kid, a teen-aged thief, and Gil, a mysterious masked magician. It is a side story to Chrono Trigger, wrapping up a loose end from its predecessor's plot.

=== Chrono Cross ===
Chrono Cross was released on the PlayStation on November 18, 1999, in Japan and on August 15, 2000, in North America. The story is partly a remake of Radical Dreamers, and as such replaces it as Chrono Trigger's successor. The protagonist Serge, faced with an alternate reality in which he died as a child, struggles to uncover his past and meets Kid, a thief seeking the mysterious Frozen Flame artifact. Serge and Kid's fates are ultimately revealed to find their roots in the events of Chrono Trigger. A remaster, Chrono Cross: Radical Dreamers Edition, was released in 2022.

=== Chrono Break ===
Chrono Brake and Chrono Break are the names of two trademarks owned by Square Co.; the first applied in Japan on November 5, 2001, and the second registered in the United States on December 5 of the same year. The registrations were preceded by a press report in which Hironobu Sakaguchi mentioned that the Chrono Cross team was interested in developing a new game in the Chrono series, and that script and story ideas were being considered. However, Square did not publish further news, and the American trademark Chrono Break was eventually dropped on November 13, 2003.

== Dimensional Adventure Numa Monjar ==
Dimensional Adventure Numa Monjar (時空冒険ヌウマモンジャ～, Jikū Bōken Nūmamonjā; lit. "Time and Space Adventures: Nu-Mamonja") is a 16-minute humoristic and promotional Chrono Trigger anime which was broadcast at the Japanese V-Jump Festival of July 31, 1996. It was created by Production I.G, and written by Hiroshi Izawa and Akihiro Kikuchi, while Itsuro Kawasaki served as director, Tensai Okamura as animation director, and Riho Nishino as character designer.

The anime takes place in the same setting as Chrono Trigger during the night before the beginning of the game's events. It follows two monsters from the game, a Nu and a Mamo (called Kilwala in the English version of the game), voiced by Chafurin and Mayumi Tanaka respectively, through various adventures. These all take place in the "Millennial Fair", the festival at the beginning of Chrono Trigger, which in the anime has been infested by a festive gathering of monsters coming through portals. They meet several characters from the game, including Johnny and Gonzalez (called Gato in the English version of the game). The anime ends with a scene from the following morning after the monsters have all left, in which Crono and Lucca can be seen. The credits show Nu and Mamo parodying scenes from the game.

The anime was followed by a manga series of the same name published in V Jump starting in 1996. The series follows Mamo and Nu, who are joined by Johnny and Spekkio (in the form of a frog), as they continue their adventure through time. They meet various characters from Chrono Trigger along the way, including Masamune, Lavos, Gaspar, Ozzie, Slash and Flea. In 1998, the chapters of the series were released as a tankōbon.

== Music ==
The music of the Chrono series was mainly composed by Yasunori Mitsuda. Chrono Trigger was the first game for which he had served as composer. After Mitsuda contracted stomach ulcers, Final Fantasy composer Nobuo Uematsu was brought onto the project to compose ten songs. At the time of the game's release, the quantity of its tracks and sound effects were unprecedented. Additionally, a one-disc acid jazz arrangement called The Brink of Time was also released. Mitsuda went on to compose the soundtrack for Radical Dreamers: Nusumenai Hōseki, which was never commercially released as an album.

In 1999, Yasunori Mitsuda, now a freelance composer, returned to score the soundtrack for Chrono Cross after being contacted by Masato Kato. Mitsuda decided to center his work around old world cultural influences, including Mediterranean, Fado, Celtic, and percussive African music. Xenogears contributor Tomohiko Kira played guitar on the beginning and ending themes. Noriko Mitose, as selected by Masato Kato, sang the ending song, "Radical Dreamers ~ Le Trésor Interdit". Mitsuda was happy to accomplish even half of what he envisioned. Certain songs were ported from the score of Radical Dreamers, while other entries in the soundtrack contain leitmotifs from both Chrono Trigger and Radical Dreamers.

In 2006, Mitsuda arranged versions of music from the Chrono series for Play! video game music concerts, presenting the Chrono Trigger and Chrono Cross main themes, as well as "Frog's Theme", and "To Far Away Times".

== Reception ==
Aggregate review scores As of October 24, 2013.
Game	Metacritic
Chrono Trigger	(NDS) 92 (iOS) 71
Chrono Cross	(PS) 94

The Chrono series has been very successful in game rankings and sales. Chrono Trigger shipped 2.36 million copies in Japan and 290,000 abroad by 2003, reaching two million in sales in only two months. It ended 1995 as the third best-selling game of the year behind Dragon Quest VI: Realms of Revelation and Donkey Kong Country 2: Diddy's Kong Quest in Japan. The game was met with substantial success upon release in North America, and its rerelease on the PlayStation as part of the Final Fantasy Chronicles package topped the NPD TRSTS PlayStation sales charts for over six weeks. The Chrono Trigger DS remake has shipped 490,000 copies in Japan and 220,000 in North America as of December 2008. Chrono Cross also sold well, shipping 850,000 and 650,000 units in Japan and abroad respectively. It was re-released once in the United States as a Greatest Hits title and again as part of the Japanese Ultimate Hits series. Excluding the PC version, Chrono Trigger had shipped over 3.5 million copies worldwide by February 2018. By 2019, Chrono Trigger and Chrono Cross had sold over 5.5 million units combined.

Chrono Trigger has placed highly on all six of multimedia website IGN's "top 100 games of all time" lists—4th in 2002, 6th in early 2005, 13th in late 2005, 2nd in 2006, 18th in 2007, and 2nd in 2008. GameSpot included Chrono Trigger in "The Greatest Games of All Time" list released in April 2006, and it also appeared as 28th on an "All Time Top 100" list in a poll conducted by Japanese magazine Famitsu. Nintendo Power's 100th issue placed it eighteenth on their "100 Best Nintendo Games of All Time", and in their twentieth anniversary issue named it the fifth best Super NES game. Chrono Cross was also well received by reviewers; GameSpot awarded the game a perfect 10, one of only seven games in over 40,000 games listed on GameSpot to have been given the score, and its Console Game of the Year Award for 2000. IGN gave the game a score of 9.7, and Cross appeared 89th in its 2008 Top 100 games list.

The music of the series has been very highly regarded and enjoyed wide popularity. IGN termed the Chrono Trigger soundtrack "one of the best videogame soundtracks ever produced" and said that the music was a large part of the game's ability to "capture the emotions of the player". It furthermore called the soundtrack "some of the most memorable tunes in RPG history". The game itself won the "Best Music in a Cartridge-Based Game" award in Electronic Gaming Monthly's 1995 video game awards. The soundtrack for Chrono Cross won the Gold Prize for Sony's PlayStation Awards of 2000. IGN, in their review of the game, termed the soundtrack "a brilliant score" that "does wonders in stirring the emotional strings of the players as they're playing through the game". In a separate piece about Japanese RPG composers, IGN named Yasunori Mitsuda the second best out of ten behind Nobuo Uematsu.

== See also ==
- List of Square Enix video game franchises
