= Characters of Chrono Trigger =

From left to right: Frog, Ayla, Lucca, Robo, Marle, and Crono

This is a listing of notable characters from the video game Chrono Trigger, a role-playing video game released in 1995 by Square Co. (now Square Enix) for the Super Nintendo Entertainment System video game console. In keeping with the time travel theme of the game's storyline, the characters hail from different eras of a fictional history, ranging from prehistory to a post-apocalyptic future.

== Creation and influences ==
Masato Kato's original sketches of the main characters. From left to right: the daughter of a fairy king, a tin robot (top), a monster man (bottom), an inventor girl, the male protagonist, a demon king, a primitive girl, and an old sage

The characters of Chrono Trigger were designed by Akira Toriyama based on sketches from the story planner Masato Kato. The development team wanted a diverse cast to reflect the various eras visited by the player; while working on the in-battle actions of the game, they decided to include a playable character that was neither human nor robot. Kato drew sketches for a cast of eight playable characters, comprising a male protagonist, the daughter of a fairy king, a tin robot, a monster man, an inventor girl, a demon king, a primitive girl, and an old sage. Pig and monkey characters were also considered. Six of the initial ideas were reworked by Toriyama, while the old sage character was scrapped and the monster man replaced with Toriyama's own frog man design.

In addition to the artwork for the main cast, Toriyama designed the non-playable characters and the monsters of the game, though Hironobu Sakaguchi contributed the idea of the singing robot Gato. The development staff studied all the drawings Toriyama made for the game and tried to be as faithful to his lighthearted style as possible. In particular, humorous names were chosen for several characters. The staff noted that this kind of humor would have been impossible in the Final Fantasy series. Some of the names used in the English localization of the game were inspired by Biblical characters, including Belthasar, Gaspar, Melchior, and Magus. However, Kato did not especially have the Bible in mind when writing the story and was not aware of the names created by the translator Ted Woolsey.

== Playable characters ==
=== Crono ===
Crono (クロノ, Kurono) is the red spiky-haired silent protagonist of the game. He is never shown speaking, using facial expressions to communicate. His name is spelled "Chrono" in Japanese materials. He lives in the village of Truce with his mother. A chance encounter with Marle at the fair begins a series of adventures and uncovers a pre-millennial evil. In 12,000 BC, when the party is confronted with Lavos in the Ocean Palace of the Kingdom of Zeal, Crono sacrifices himself to save his friends, resulting in his death. With time travel, the player can manage to replace Crono at the moment before he dies with a clone received from the Millennial Fair in 1000 A.D, saving his life. The PlayStation, Nintendo DS, Apple iOS, Android, and Microsoft Windows/Steam versions of Chrono Trigger include an FMV scene at the end that shows Crono and Marle getting married. A second FMV depicts the fall of Guardia Kingdom in the year AD 1005, though it is unknown what happened to him during this event.

=== Marle ===
Marle (マール, Māru; "Marl" in Japanese materials) is the princess of Guardia. Her real name is Princess Nadia (マールディア, Mārudia; "Marldia"), and she is often at odds with her father, the king. Bored of royal life in the castle, she slips out to the Millennial Fair in Truce. Here, she meets Crono and tries out Lucca's teleporter, which reacts with her pendant and creates a time Gate, sending her to the Middle Ages and kicking off the events of the game. Her family line is the victim of two unsuccessful plots to overtake the kingdom: once in the Middle Ages, and once in the Present time by the shapeshifting monster Yakra (ヤクラ, Yakura) and his descendant Yakra XIII, respectively. In both cases, the monsters kidnap the chancellor and assume his form. The likeness of the latter was perfect to a fault, but he did make one mistake: barring Marle from the courtroom, allowing her to investigate the false claims leveled against her father. The PlayStation and Nintendo DS versions of Chrono Trigger includes an FMV scene at the end that shows Crono and Marle getting married. A second FMV depicts the fall of Guardia Kingdom in the year AD 1005, though it is unknown what happened to Marle during this event.

Marle uses a crossbow as her weapon. When she gains the ability to use magic, she learns to use "Ice (Water)" elemental magic manifesting as ice and healing spells. In the initial character sketches, she was the daughter of a fairy king and had shorter hair.

Four writers in Famicom Tsūshin gave Marle rating of 8, 9, 4, and 5 out of 10 respectively. They found her useful as a healer early in the game, with one reviewer dislike how much she relied on Chrono.

=== Lucca Ashtear ===
Lucca Ashtear (ルッカ・アシュティア, Rukka Ashutia) is Crono's childhood friend. Using her intelligence and creativity, Lucca invented many devices, such as a battle-training robot named Gato ("Gonzales" in the Japanese version) and a short-range teleporter. This device caused Marle to go back in time, inevitably leading to the start of the game. Lucca is directly responsible for the playability of another character in the game – Robo, whom she finds and repairs in the future. In the ending FMV scene of the PlayStation and Nintendo DS versions, it is seen that Lucca eventually created a mini-robot modeled after Robo. In the same scene, Lucca finds an infant with a pendant and takes her in. That child is revealed to be Kid, Schala's daughter-clone and the female protagonist in the sequel to Chrono Trigger, Chrono Cross.

=== Frog ===
Frog (カエル, Kaeru) is an anthropomorphic frog knight from the Middle Ages era. He was born as a human by the name Glenn and a friend of the late brave knight Cyrus. After witnessing Cyrus' death at the hands of Magus and being transformed into a frog, Frog vowed to avenge Cyrus by killing Magus. During the game, he obtains the Masamune (Grandleon in the Japanese version), an ancient sword whose offensive capabilities against magic users is Magus' major weakness. Frog can later put Cyrus' ghost to rest, regaining his courage and clearing his conscience.

Frog wields a broadsword and can also learn "Water" and, like Marle, healing magic. His design in the final version of the game replaces that of a monster man character from the initial character sketches. In Ted Woolsey's English translation, Frog speaks in a grandiose, pseudo-Shakespearean manner, using words such as 'thou', 'thee', and 'shalt'. No one else from his era speaks that way, nor does he use it himself as the young or adult Glenn. In the re-translation for the DS version, Frog's manner of speech is closer to modern, yet antiquated English, and no longer adopts the accent of the earlier versions. Likewise, in the Japanese version, he does not speak with the accent and instead talks rather rudely.

Four writers in Famicom Tsūshin gave Frog ratings of 10, 10, 10, and 9 out of 10 respectively. They found him useful because he was strong and could heal characters. Reviewers appreciated his tear-inducing narrative.

=== Robo ===
Robo (ロボ) is a futuristic robot with serial number R-66Y, rendered dormant by the apocalypse in AD 1999 but found and repaired by Lucca in the year AD 2300. Upon his reactivation, Robo has no memory of his prior mission and joins the party. In a sidequest, Robo is branded a traitor by his maker, Mother Brain (マザーブレーン, Mazā Burēn), a rogue computer who opposes humans and desires a utopia of robots. Robo learns of his original purpose which was to observe and study human behavior as well as his original name, which is Prometheus (プロメテス, Purometesu). Robo is then forced to kill his long-lost, brainwashed companion robot Atropos XR (アトロポス145, Atoroposu 145; Atropos 145) because he refuses to side with her before he manages to shut down the computer. In another side quest, Robo can volunteer to spend four hundred years restoring Fiona's forest. During this time, Robo ponders the existence of an "entity", a dying being who wished Crono and his friends to witness its life throughout time. At the end of this side quest, the beginning of another side quest involving Lucca is started.

Robo uses his robotic arm as a weapon and can use laser attacks which mimic "Shadow" magic, as well as other techs that mimic "Fire" and "Light" skills. He is considered unable to use magic because he is not organic, and therefore did not descend from the magic-using people of Zeal. In the initial character sketches, he had a different design and was larger. In the Japanese version, Robo has a unique speech; he speaks with bits of katakana in his sayings and has trouble with pronunciations. Most of the robots talk in katakana, with the exception of Johnny.

Four writers in Famicom Tsūshin gave Robo ratings of 7, 8, 9, and 8 out of 10 respectively. While reviewer said that outside battles, they tended to leave him behind, another said they liked the noises he made while talking but disliked his name suggesting players to re-name him. Destructoid's Chad Concelmo named Robo the best robot in gaming, citing an ongoing connection with the character.

=== Ayla ===
Ayla (エイラ, Eira) is the chief of a prehistoric tribe. She is engaged in a conflict with Azala (アザーラ, Azāra), the leader of the Reptites who leads the effort to destroy the human race to prove their superiority. Ayla and the party eventually defeat Azala at the Tyrano Lair, and Azala dies from the impact of Lavos crashing into the place. At that point, Ayla is revealed to be the person who gave Lavos its name, claiming that "La" means fire, and "Vos" means big. In the ending anime cut-scene of the PlayStation version, Ayla is seen brashly forcing engagement on Kino, her sweetheart, and Marle's ancestor.

=== Magus ===
Magus (魔王, Maō; "Maoh" in Japanese materials, literally meaning "Demon King") is the lord of the Mystics of the Middle Ages. Depicted as an antagonist for a large part of the game, Magus is eventually revealed to be the older version of Janus (ジャキ, Jaki; "Jaki"), the young prince of Zeal in 12,000 BC. After an encounter with Lavos as a child, he had been sent through a time gate to the Middle Ages, where he was adopted by Ozzie of the Mystics and became their leader. After the fall of Zeal, the player can choose to fight Magus or spare him, allowing him to reluctantly join the party. As the second fight is to the death, Magus will be permanently gone after this fight plays out.

In the DS version of the game, a future version of Magus appears in the new scenario, stating that the player's party may or may not be from the same dimension as his. He finally finds Schala at the Time's Eclipse, integrated into Lavos as the Dream Devourer the early form of Time Devourer from Chrono cross. Failing to save his sister, Magus is sent away by his sister Schala and erase his memories in a fit of desperation. Though he lost his memories, Magus is determined to remember what he had desired to find something. Also in the Nintendo DS version, most NPCs have given him the title of "the Fiendlord."

Magus fights using a scythe, as well as a combination of all magic types, including his own exclusive "Shadow" magic. Contrary to the other characters, he does not learn any dual techs, and accessories must be found to unlock several triple techs. His three main generals in the Middle Ages are Ozzie (ビネガー, Binegā; "Vinegar"), Slash (ソイソー, Soisō; "Soysau"), and Flea (マヨネー, Mayonē; "Mayonnai"). In a side-quest, the player can visit the place they took refuge in after the fall of Magus' castle and defeat them again.

Four writers in Famicom Tsūshin gave Magus ratings of 7, 8, 7, and 7 out of 10 respectively. They found his strong attacks useful. One reviewer complimented his quiet and stern personality.

== Main non-playable characters ==
=== Lavos ===
Lavos (ラヴォス, Ravosu) is the game's primary antagonist, an alien parasite with immense destructive powers, which crash landed in the year 65,000,000 BC (65,000 BC in the Japanese version). Lavos slept, gaining power until AD 1999, when he emerged and put the world into an apocalyptic state. While traveling to AD 2300, Crono, Marle, and Lucca see a video of the Day of Lavos of AD 1999, and decide to prevent it somehow. It is eventually revealed that Lavos came to Earth with the intention of draining its energy so that it could produce genetically enhanced spawn, which would then continue the cycle on other planets.

The DS version adds an optional final boss to the game, the "Dream Devourer", which is the result of the assimilation of Schala by the defeated Lavos at Time's Eclipse. In the North American version of the game, it is claimed that Lavos directly influenced all technology and life on the planet, evolving the planet's life forms to cultivate it, and make itself stronger. Magus states, "We were created only to be harvested. All people... and all living things..." This line is absent in the Japanese version, with Lavos being a more passive parasite instead.

Early in the game, the characters believe that Lavos created the time Gates. They come to a different realization in one of the sidequests; due to the timing of when the gates appeared and their significance, the gates may have been created by some other entity reliving its life cycle, flashing back over important memories in its past which were tied to Lavos. The original Japanese dialogue in this scene heavily implies that this entity is the planet itself.

=== Gurus ===
The Gurus of Life, Time, and Reason – named Melchior (ガッシュ, Gasshu; "Gasch"), Gaspar (ハッシュ, Hasshu; "Hash"), and Belthasar (ボッシュ, Bosshu; "Bosch") – are three highly intelligent figures of authority originally living in the Kingdom of Zeal in 12000 BC. Their original Japanese names are Gash (Gasshu), Hash (Hasshu) and Bosch (Bosshu). Their English names are taken from the traditional names given to the Magi who brought gifts of gold, frankincense and myrrh to the infant Jesus. When Queen Zeal became obsessed with harnessing the energy of Lavos, the Gurus tried to stop her, which ultimately resulted in Lavos sending each of them into different eras of the future: Melchior to AD 1000, Belthasar to AD 2300, and Gaspar to the End of Time.

The player encounters the Gurus in their respective eras or in 12000 BC and receives valuable items and advice from them.

- Melchior's main creation is the Masamune, which has a symbiotic relation with twin magical creatures named Masa (グラン, Guran; "Gran") and Mune (リオン, Rion; "Leon"). The two have a "big sister" named Doreen, who has a liking for dreams.
- Gaspar's main creation is the "Time Egg", also known as the "Chrono Trigger", a mysterious item capable of effecting miracles. Gaspar lives in the End of Time with Spekkio (スペッキオ, Supekkio), the self-proclaimed "Master of War" who introduces the art of Magic to Crono and his teammates.
- Belthasar lives in the wastelands of the year 2300 and his main creation is the Epoch, a time-traveling machine that works independent of portals.

=== Schala ===
Schala (サラ, Sara) is the daughter of Queen Zeal and the older sister of Janus. She was raised in the Kingdom of Zeal in 12000 BC when mankind was separated into the Enlightened Ones, who are able to use magic, and the Earthbound Ones, who are not. She is one of the few Enlightened Ones sympathetic towards the Earthbound Ones. Schala was forced by her power-hungry mother, Queen Zeal, to use her magic power to control the energy of Lavos with the Mammon Machine. She disappeared after the Ocean Palace disaster. In the DS version, she is revealed to have been assimilated by the defeated Lavos in the Time's Eclipse, as in the sequel Chrono Cross. The creature can be fought, as the "Dream Devourer", which unlocks a new ending.

=== Dalton ===
Zeal's general and high-ranking adviser of the magical Kingdom of Zeal, Dalton (ダルトン, Daruton) is depicted as an overall inept character, once even breaking the fourth wall when he complains about the wrong music playing in the background while he stole the Epoch. He is not entirely loyal to Queen Zeal, and he wants to have Lavos' power for himself. Dalton has an army of Golems that he uses to attack the party. He also uses the plane The Blackbird, as a flying fortress. After the rise of the Ocean Palace and the disappearance of Zeal's royal family, Dalton sees himself as the new king of the Dark Ages. He abducts the party shortly after Crono's death and imprisons them on The Blackbird. He is also responsible for modifying The Epoch with the ability to fly for his own purposes. Ultimately, Dalton disappears by accident in a portal he himself opened.

In the DS remake, Dalton later resurfaces at the Dimensional Vortex and attacks the party one final time. When defeated, he vows revenge and disappears again after stating he will raise the world's greatest army in Porre and defeat Guardia. A caped silhouette is seen briefly during the attack on Guardia Castle in the ending FMV from the PlayStation and DS versions of the game, and Masato Kato has stated that the armies of Porre received assistance from "beyond the regular flow of time" in their invasion of Guardia.

=== Zeal ===
Queen Zeal (ジール, Jīru) is the ruler of the kingdom of the same name in 12,000 BC. Her change from kind and loving to evil and manipulative seems to be linked to her interest in Lavos, whom she wishes to use to achieve power and eternal life. Zeal's court of Enlightened Ones includes her magician and general, Dalton, her young son, Janus, her unwilling daughter, Schala, and the mysterious Prophet (actually Magus in disguise). Zeal becomes the antagonist for a period of the game and eventually the catalyst for the death of Crono. She commissions to have the Mammon Machine built for direct communication to Lavos, as well as to help the creature achieve more power. Eventually, Zeal raises her Ocean Palace and lives in the Black Omen for several thousand years, even into the post-apocalyptic world of 2300 AD. She is eventually killed by Crono and company if they infiltrate the Black Omen.

== Other appearances ==
=== In Radical Dreamers ===
Magus appears in Radical Dreamers as Gil, a shadowy and handsome member of the Radical Dreamers thieving group. He is depicted as masked and mysterious, though gentle and cultured. He has the ability to slip in and out of the shadows of the night at will. In the game, Schala's fate is explained as she is seen reincarnated in the present time as a girl named Kid. Gil is mentioned in Chrono Cross in an easter egg designating the events of Radical Dreamers as having taken place in an alternate dimension. In the English version of this easter egg, Gil is referred to as "Magil".

=== In Xenogears ===
Early in Xenogears, Lucca has a brief cameo appearance in the Lahan Village, in which she gives a tutorial about the basics of the game's battle system and explains save points to Fei.

=== In Chrono Cross ===
In Chrono Cross, Crono, Marle, and Lucca make appearances as ghost children. Kato stated that Crono and Marle's fate "is not thoroughly explained in Chrono Cross" but that the two were likely involved in "some kind of incident" related to the invasion of their kingdom by the Porre army. He further explained that an intervention "from outside the original flow of history" had helped Porre build its military, though the details were left out of Chrono Cross as they did not directly relate to the sequel.

On the other hand, Lucca plays a role in the backstory of Chrono Cross, being involved in the "Project Kid" central to the game's plot and presumably killed by the antagonists Lynx and Harle. An artificial intelligence named Prometheus also plays a part in the plot and is eventually erased by FATE, a supercomputer based on Mother Brain. Masato Kato implied in an interview that this character is the same as Chrono Trigger's Robo, whose real name was also Prometheus.

Magus was slated to appear in Chrono Cross. Several designs were considered for his appearance, including one close to his Chrono Trigger design, one as a teenage boy, and one as a masked magician called Guile. However, as development of the game progressed and the number of playable characters increased, the staff decided it would be too difficult to integrate his complex relationship with Schala into the plot. Consequently, Guile's backstory as Magus was removed and his design was altered to look paler. Kato noted that Magus' non-appearance in the game is "in a way, […] a pity".

Though he died in Chrono Trigger, Balthazar reappears alive and well in Chrono Cross due to the changed future created by Crono's actions. Belthasar initiated "Project Kid", a complicated series of events that would lead to the saving of Schala and the annihilation of the Devourer of Time, thus saving the universe. The Devourer of Time is the result of the defeated Lavos assimilating Schala in the darkness beyond time. In "New Game+" mode, Ozzie, Slash, and Flea also make an appearance as hidden bosses, nicknamed the "mystical knights".

=== In other media ===
Gaspar and Johnny appear in the board game Koi Ha Balance: Battle of Lovers released on the Satellaview system. The promotional anime Dimensional Adventure Numa Monjar centers on the adventure of a Kilwala and a Nu (ヌゥ), a mysterious type of creature which in Chrono Trigger was found in all time periods, usually sleeping. Gato and Johnny also appear in Dimensional Adventure Numa Monjar.

In the spiritual successor game of Another Eden: The Cat Beyond Time, there is a character that is in the starting village of Baruoki that is named Ashtear that has a heavy resemblance to Lucca Ashtear from Chrono Trigger, which is not surprising, as several former Square Enix employees also worked on that game. Moreover, she is also the one to help Aldo and his party with getting through the game, much as a similar house in the village of Truce served a similar purpose for Crono and his party in Chrono Trigger.

== Reception ==
IGN described the cast of characters as one that players "immediately fell in love with, and helped "Chrono Trigger" become one of the most beloved RPGs ever released. Games Radar praised the depth of the characters’ sub-plots, which gave the game a deeply "personal" feel. In a retrospective, Game Informer noted that the characters still felt "fresh and interesting" even two decades since the game's original release. Venture Beat described the more realistic proportions of the characters than previous games, which helped give characters a more "human-like" appearance and thus more relatability. The dialogue lets the characters express the emotions they would rather hide, and the game's emphasis on character interaction leads to great emotional investment in Crono and Marle's relationship, Frog's struggles for redemption, and even Magus's eons-long fight for revenge against Lavos.

GamePro ranked Lavos the 34th most diabolical video game villain of all time. IGN ranked Lavos 75th in the "Top 100 Videogames Villains" saying "Despite Crono's victory, being the perpetrator of humankind's annihilation while at the same time napping makes Lavos a pretty good candidate for the Top 100 Villains, wouldn't you think?". Magus was also ranked 52nd.
