= Colours of Light =

Compilation album by Yasunori Mitsuda
- Released: August 26, 2009
- Length: 69:49
- Label: Sleigh Bells
- Producer: Yasunori Mitsuda

Colours of Light is the compilation album of vocal pieces by Yasunori Mitsuda. It was released on August 26, 2009, in Japan by Sleigh Bells. The album is composed of 14 remastered songs from games and soundtracks that he has composed, and one piece from an album of original songs by game music composers.

== Track listing ==
All music is composed by Yasunori Mitsuda.

No.	Title	Performance	Length
1.	"Sailing to the World" (from The Seventh Seal)	Koko Komine	3:34
2.	"Promise with Winds ~ Petals' Whereabouts" (from Kirite)	Eri Kawai	4:52
3.	"Time's Arm" (from Sands of Destruction)	Czech Philharmonic Collegium	2:09
4.	"Pain" (from Xenosaga Episode I)	Joanne Hogg	5:39
5.	"Creid" (from Creid)	Eimear Quinn	4:44
6.	"Stairs of Light" (from Creid)	Tetsuko "Techie" Honda	3:49
7.	"Kokoro" (from Xenosaga Episode I)	Joanne Hogg	5:41
8.	"Ring" (from Soma Bringer)	Eri Kawai	1:14
9.	"Silver Leica" (from Ten Plants 2)	Noriko Mitose	7:03
10.	"Stars of Tears ~Yasashiku Hoshi wo Furishikiru~" (from Xenogears)	Joanne Hogg	3:02
11.	"Spring Lullaby" (from Creid)	Tetsuko "Techie" Honda	5:34
12.	"Small Two of Pieces ~Kishinda Hahen~" (from Xenogears)	Joanne Hogg	6:24
13.	"Reincarnation" (from The Seventh Seal)	Koko Komine	5:22
14.	"The Name of Our Hope" (from Kirite)	Eri Kawai	4:56
15.	"Radical Dreamers ~The Jewel That Has Not Been Stolen~" (from Chrono Cross)	Noriko Mitose	4:37
