= Tamago =

Tamago is the Japanese word for egg.

It may also refer to:

== Literature ==
- "Tamago", a 1950 short story by Yasunari Kawabata in Palm-of-the-Hand Stories
- "Tamago", a 1953 short story by Yukio Mishima

== Music ==
- Tamago (album), by Masami Akita, 2003
- Tamago (EP), by Aimyon, 2015
- "Tamago", a 1983 single by Sugar
- "Tamago", a song from the 2008 Misono album Say

== Television ==
- "Tamago" (Mr. Stain on Junk Alley), a 2003 anime episode
- "Tamago", a segment in episode 21 of Delicious in Dungeon, 2024

== Other uses ==
- Tama-Go, a character class from Tamagotchi Town
- In sushi cuisine, tamago can refer to nigiri made with Tamagoyaki.

== See also ==
- The dictionary definition of たまご at Wiktionary (Japanese: たまご, romanized: tamago)
- The dictionary definition of 玉子 at Wiktionary (Japanese: 玉子, romanized: tamago)
- The dictionary definition of 卵 at Wiktionary (Japanese: 卵, romanized: tamago)
