= Music of Chrono Cross =

Music of the video game Chrono Cross

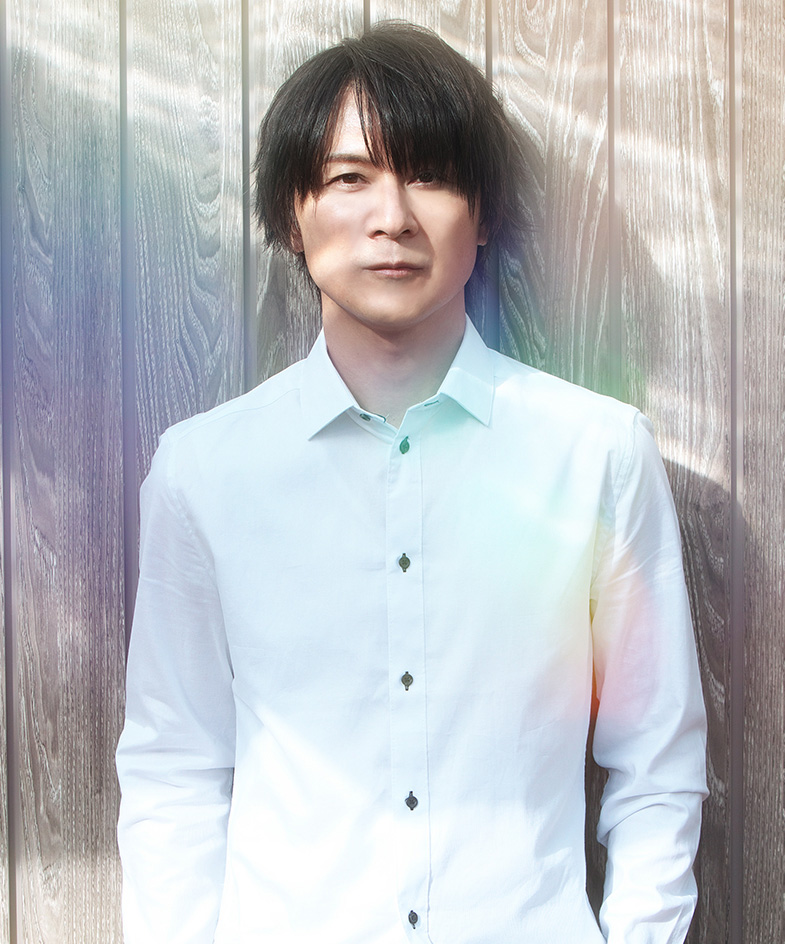
Composer Yasunori Mitsuda

The Chrono series is a role-playing video game franchise by Square Enix (formerly Square). It began in 1995 with Chrono Trigger, which spawned two continuations, Radical Dreamers and Chrono Cross. The music of Chrono Cross was composed by Yasunori Mitsuda, the main composer of Chrono Trigger and Radical Dreamers. Chrono Cross has sparked a soundtrack album, released in 1999 by DigiCube and re-released in 2005 by Square Enix, and a greatest hits mini-album, published in 2000 by Square along with the North American release of the game. Radical Dreamers, the music of which heavily inspired the soundtrack of Chrono Cross, has not sparked any albums, though some songs from its soundtrack were reused in Chrono Cross. An album of arrangements of Chrono Cross songs was first announced by Mitsuda in 2005, and later intended to be released to coincide with the tenth anniversary of the game in 2009; its release date was pushed back several times since then. In 2015, Mitsuda released an album of arranged music from Chrono Trigger and Chrono Cross entitled To Far Away Times to commemorate the 20-year anniversary of Chrono Trigger.

The original soundtrack album has been hailed as an excellent video game music album, while the Chrono Cross Music Selection mini-album has garnered little attention. Songs from the soundtrack have been played at various orchestral concerts, such as the personal arrangements by Mitsuda for the Play! A Video Game Symphony concert series. Chrono Cross music has also been extensively remixed by fans, and such remixes have been included in both official and unofficial albums.

== Creation and development ==
Mitsuda returned as the lead composer for 1999's Chrono Cross after composing its predecessor, Chrono Trigger. After being contacted to compose the score by the game's director Masato Kato, Mitsuda decided to center his work around Old World cultural influences, including Mediterranean, Fado, Celtic, and percussive African music. To complement the theme of parallel worlds, he gave the songs for the two worlds of the game, Another and Home, respectively dark and bright moods. Mitsuda was happy to accomplish even half of what he envisioned. Once production concluded, Mitsuda played Chrono Cross to record his impressions and observe how the tracks intermingled with scenes.

Radical Dreamers was a 1996 text-based Visual Novel set as a gaiden, or side story, to Chrono Trigger. It was released to complement its predecessor's plot, and later served as inspiration for Chrono Cross. The music of Radical Dreamers was written by Yasunori Mitsuda. The soundtrack includes several ambient pieces, including the sound of water running in a fountain and wind accompanied by strings. Players can listen to the game's 15 songs by accessing a hidden menu in one of the game's scenarios. The soundtrack has never been released as a separate album.

Several themes and musical patterns from Radical Dreamers were later adapted for Chrono Cross on the suggestion of Masato Kato; many appear unchanged except for new instrumentation. Appearing in Chrono Cross are "Gale", "Frozen Flame", "Viper Manor", "Far Promise ~ Dream Shore" (as part of "On the Beach of Dreams - Another World" and "The Dream that Time Dreams"), "The Girl who Stole the Stars", and "Epilogue ~ Dream Shore" (as part of "Jellyfish Sea"). Other entries in the soundtrack contain leitmotifs from Chrono Trigger and Radical Dreamers. The melody of "Far Promise ~ Dream Shore" features prominently in "The Dream That Time Dreams" and "Voyage - Another World".

== Albums ==
=== Chrono Cross Original Soundtrack ===
Chrono Cross Original Soundtrack

Soundtrack album by Yasunori Mitsuda
- Released: December 18, 1999; June 29, 2005
- Genre: Ambient, Classical, Downtempo, Electronic, Minimal, Video game music
- Length: 2:53:51
- Label: DigiCube; Square Enix (re-release)

The Chrono Cross Original Soundtrack is a soundtrack of the music from Chrono Cross, composed by Yasunori Mitsuda. The soundtrack spans three discs and 67 tracks, covering a duration of 3 hours. It was published by DigiCube on December 18, 1999, and reprinted by Square Enix on June 29, 2005.

Xenogears contributor Tomohiko Kira played guitar on the beginning and ending themes. Noriko Mitose, selected for the role by Masato Kato, sang the ending song "Radical Dreamers ~ Unstolen Jewel ~". Ryo Yamazaki, a synthesizer programmer for Square Enix, helped Mitsuda transfer his ideas to the PlayStation's sound capabilities. The soundtrack has been described as having "some of the most haunting melodies known to man". The "Home World" tracks from the soundtrack have been termed "emotional", "driving" and "striking", while the "Another World" tracks are described as "slower", "dreamier", and more "serene" than their counterparts.

"Radical Dreamers ~ Unstolen Jewel"
A 30-second sample of game's credits theme, demonstrating the voice of Noriko Mitose.

The soundtrack won the Gold Prize for Sony's PlayStation Awards of 2000. It reached #72 on the Japan Oricon charts on its first print and #174 when reprinted. It was praised by reviewers such as Patrick Gann of RPGFan, who called it his favorite video game music soundtrack of all time and especially praised the vocals in "Radical Dreamers ~ Unstolen Jewel ~". This high opinion was echoed by Don Kotowski of Square Enix Music Online, who called it "one of Mitsuda's best, both in and out of [the] context" of the game and said that it "surpasses his Chrono Trigger soundtrack". He singled out "Scars of Time" and "Radical Dreamers" as especially worthy of praise. IGN, in their review of the game, termed the soundtrack "a brilliant score" that "does wonders in stirring the emotional strings of the players as they're playing through the game". IGN praised the technical sound quality of the soundtrack as well, though they did comment that for them no specific tracks stood out as especially memorable. In a separate piece about Japanese RPG composers, however, IGN called "Scars of Time" and "Arni Village - Home World" as two of Mitsuda's most memorable tracks in naming him the second best out of ten behind Nobuo Uematsu.

Track listing

Disc one
No.	Title	Length
1.	"Chrono Cross -Scars of Time-" (CHRONO CROSS ~時の傷痕~)	2:29
2.	"The Brink of Death" (死線)	2:38
3.	"Arni (Home World)" (アルニ村 ホーム)	3:23
4.	"Plains of Time (Home World)" (時の草原 ホーム・ワールド)	3:26
5.	"Dances with Lizards" (トカゲと踊れ)	2:41
6.	"Reminisce -Enduring Thoughts-" (回想 〜消せない想い〜)	3:25
7.	"Shore of Dreams (Another World)" (夢の岸辺に アナザー・ワールド)	2:22
8.	"Arni (Another World)" (アルニ村 アナザー)	3:32
9.	"Fleeting Thoughts" (うたかたの想い)	2:51
10.	"Missing Piece" (失われた欠片)	3:12
11.	"Fossil Valley" (溺れ谷)	2:00
12.	"Termina (Another World)" (テルミナ アナザー)	2:43
13.	"The Departed Ones" (去りにし者ども)	3:43
14.	"Shadow Forest" (影切りの森)	3:25
15.	"Viper Manor" (蛇骨館)	2:54
16.	"Victory -Boon of Spring-" (勝利 ~春の贈り物~)	0:56
17.	"Lost in Time" (時の迷い子)	3:24
18.	"Guldove (Another World)" (ガルドーブ アナザー)	3:26
19.	"Hydra Marshes" (ヒドラの沼)	3:10
20.	"Dreamy Shards" (夢のかけら)	1:35
21.	"Sailing (Another World)" (航海 アナザー・ワールド)	2:32
22.	"Ghost Ship" (幽霊船)	2:00
23.	"Mount Pyre" (死炎山)	3:39
24.	"Fort Dragonia" (古龍の砦)	3:54
25.	"Sorrow" (悲愴)	0:20
Total length:		69:40

Disc two
No.	Title	Length
1.	"Prelude to a Dream" (夢のはじまり)	0:42
2.	"The Bend of Time" (次元の狭間)	2:47
3.	"Termina (Home World)" (テルミナ ホーム)	3:38
4.	"Dragoons" (龍の騎士)	3:01
5.	"Sailing (Home World)" (航海 ホーム・ワールド)	3:22
6.	"Guldove (Home World)" (ガルドーブ ホーム)	3:58
7.	"Marbule (Home World)" (マブーレ ホーム)	2:55
8.	"Zelbess" (ゼルベス)	2:42
9.	"Miraculous & Mystifying" (天晴驚愕大奇術団)	1:31
10.	"Slumber" (まどろみ)	0:13
11.	"Chronomantic" (クロノマンティーク)	3:18
12.	"Peril" (窮地)	2:47
13.	"Optimism" (楽天)	2:19
14.	"Isle of the Damned" (亡者の島)	3:11
15.	"The Dead Sea -Tower of Geddon-" (死海・滅びの塔)	3:10
16.	"Bound by Fate" (運命に囚われし者たち)	3:26
17.	"Light Cast on the Lost" (あらかじめ失われし、ともしび)	0:32
18.	"Earth Dragon Isle" (土龍の島)	3:16
19.	"Gaea's Navel" (世界のへそ)	2:59
20.	"Whirlwind" (疾風)	2:00
21.	"Victory -Call of Summer-" (勝利 ~夏の呼び声~)	0:53
22.	"Marbule (Another World)" (マブーレ アナザー)	3:00
23.	"Fairy Magic" (妖精のくれた魔法)	0:13
24.	"Etude 1" (エチュード1)	0:12
25.	"Etude 2" (エチュード2)	0:14
26.	"Magical Dreamers -Wind, Stars, and Waves-" (MAGICAL DREAMERS ~風と星と波と~)	2:02
Total length:		58:21

Disc three
No.	Title	Length
1.	"The Garden of Eden" (神の庭)	2:45
2.	"Chronopolis" (クロノポリス)	4:12
3.	"Fates -Divine Destiny-" (FATES ~運命の神~)	3:10
4.	"The El Nido Triangle" (海月海)	2:55
5.	"Burning Orphanage" (炎の孤児院)	2:44
6.	"The Girl Who Stole the Stars" (星を盗んだ少女)	3:48
7.	"Dreams of the Ages" (時のみる夢)	4:01
8.	"Dragon Prayers" (龍の祈り)	5:37
9.	"Terra Tower" (星の塔)	2:26
10.	"The Frozen Flame" (凍てついた炎)	2:54
11.	"Dragon God" (龍神)	3:21
12.	"The Darkness of Time" (時の闇にて)	0:42
13.	"Life -A Distant Promise-" (生命 ~遠い約束~)	6:32
14.	"Reminisce -Enduring Thoughts-" (回想 ~消せない想い~)	1:39
15.	"Radical Dreamers -Le Tresor Interdit-" (RADICAL DREAMERS ~盗めない宝石~)	4:25
16.	"Dreamy Shards" (夢のかけら)	2:00
Total length:		53:31

=== Chrono Cross Music Selection ===
Chrono Cross Music Selection is a mini-album of Chrono Cross music that was released in North America exclusively as a bonus for pre-ordering Chrono Cross. The five-track disc was composed by Yasunori Mitsuda, has a length of 15:47 and was published by Square along with the game on August 15, 2000. Although the release of the album sparked rumors that it would be followed by a North American release of the full soundtrack album, Square Enix has not to date published Chrono Cross OST outside Japan.

Patrick Gann enjoyed the album, calling it a "little American gem of VG music", but noted that there is no reason to purchase it now that the full soundtrack is just as easy to obtain, especially given its short length. The five tracks on this album were released on the "Original Soundtrack" with three of the tracks renamed.

Track listing
No.	Title	Length
1.	"Chrono Cross - Scars of Time" (Also "Chrono Cross - Time's Scar" on the Original Soundtrack)	2:30
2.	"The Bend of Time" (Also "The Brink of Death" on the Original Soundtrack)	2:47
3.	"Chronomantique"	3:17
4.	"Magical Dreamers - Wind, Stars, and Waves"	3:33
5.	"The Girl who Stole the Stars" (Also "Star-Stealing Girl" on the Original Soundtrack)	3:44
Total length:		15:47

=== To Far Away Times: Chrono Trigger & Chrono Cross Arrangement Album ===
In 2005, Mitsuda announced a new arranged album of Chrono Cross music was scheduled for release in July of that year. It did not materialize, though at a Play! A Video Game Symphony concert in May 2006, he revealed it would be out "within the year" and would feature acoustic music. Later in 2006, Mitsuda alleged that the album would actually be released in 2007. In 2008, Yasunori Mitsuda posted a streaming sample of a track from the upcoming Chrono Cross arranged album. Though no official release date was announced, Mitsuda more than once stated that the album would be planned to coincide with the 10th anniversary of the game's original release in 2009. Mitsuda claimed that the album was "nearly done", but that it may not be possible to release it before the year was out.

On a live performance at the Tokyo Dome in July 2015 commemorating the 20-year anniversary of Chrono Trigger, Mitsuda announced that the long requested Chrono series arrangement album, entitled To Far Away Times: Chrono Trigger & Chrono Cross Arrangement Album would be released. This was eventually released by Square Enix Music on October 14, 2015. The album was released on the Square Enix website. A number of the tracks had vocalists to go on top of the score. All tracks were composed by Yasunori Mitsuda.

Track listing
No.	Title	Length
1.	"Time's Scar" (Arranged by Tomohiko Kira / Lyrics & Vocal: Koko Komine)	4:47
2.	"RADICAL DREAMERS" (Arranged by Sachiko Miyano / Lyrics & Vocal: Sarah Àlainn)	5:31
3.	"Wind Scene" (Arranged by Kumi Tanioka & Sachiko Miyano)	4:28
4.	"Schala's Theme" (Arranged by Yasunori Mitsuda & Laura Shigihara / Lyrics & Vocal: Laura Shigihara)	4:07
5.	"The Frozen Flame" (Arranged by Natsumi Kameoka)	3:21
6.	"Marbule" (Composed & Arranged by Yasunori Mitsuda)	4:01
7.	"The Bend of Time" (Arranged by Natsumi Kameoka)	3:35
8.	"Corridors of Time" (Arranged by Yasunori Mitsuda & Laura Shigihara / Lyrics & Vocal: Laura Shigihara)	3:54
9.	"On The Other Side" (Arranged by Kazune Ogihara & Laura Shigihara / Lyrics & Vocal: Laura Shigihara)	4:12
10.	"To Far Away Times" (Arranged by Sachiko Miyano / Lyrics & Vocal: Sarah Àlainn)	4:36
Total length:		42:32

=== Orchestral Arrangement ===
On September 4, 2019, Square Enix released the album Chrono Cross Orchestral Arrangement, containing eight tracks arranged by Kosuke Yamashita, Mariam Abounnasr, Daisuke Shinoda, and Tomomichi Takeoka, and performed by the Tokyo Philharmonic Orchestra. A box set containing the album, a similar album of orchestral arrangements for Chrono Trigger, and a bonus disc of two piano duet arrangements for each game was also released. The album and box set were reviewed by Tien Hoang of VGMOnline, who found it to be a short album of uncreative arrangements that stuck closely to the original compositions. He found the piano arrangements in the box set to be better, but uneven.

=== Piano Collections ===
An album of piano arrangements was published by Wayô Records on February 4, 2021 as Across the Worlds – Chrono Cross Wayô Piano Collections. Wayô licensed the music from Mitsuda's Procyon Studio and funded the production through a June 2020 Kickstarter campaign; the arrangements were done by former Square Enix composer Masashi Hamauzu, Akio Noguchi, and Mariam Abounnasr from Procyon Studios, and were performed by Benyamin Nuss. The album contains seventeen tracks across two discs, with a total length of 1:24:38. It was reviewed by Tien Hoang of VGMOnline, who found it a solid and well-performed album, but was disappointed that the arrangements were not more complex and creative. Patrick Gann of RPGFan, however, praised the "advanced, meandering, and nuanced arrangements" as highlighting the different arrangers' styles rather than straightforward conversions of the melodies to piano, though he found the medleys and track selection to be a missed opportunity.

== Legacy ==
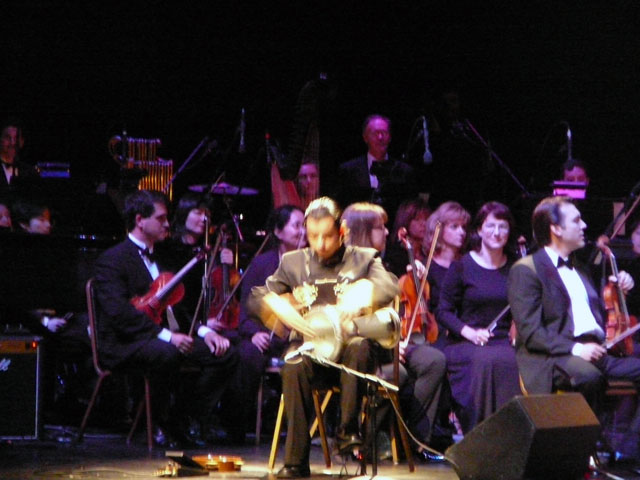
Rony Barrak during the Chrono symphonic suite at the Play! concert

Mitsuda has personally arranged versions of music from Chrono Cross for Play! A Video Game Symphony video game music concerts in 2006. Music from the game has also been performed in other video game concert tours such as the Video Games Live concert series and in concerts by the Eminence Orchestra. Music from Chrono Trigger and Cross made up one fourth of the music in the Symphonic Fantasies concerts in Leipzig in September 2009 which were produced by the creators of the Symphonic Game Music Concert series and conducted by Arnie Roth. The concerts featured a suite of music from both games interspersed together with the songs from Cross comprising "Scars of Time", "Gale", "Brink of Death", and "Prisoners of Fate". A suite comprising music from Chrono Trigger and Cross was performed at the Press Start -Symphony of Games- 2008 concerts in Tokyo and Shanghai. "Scars of Time" was played at the Fantasy Comes Alive concert in Singapore on April 30, 2010. A set of three concerts titled Radical Dreamers were performed in Tokyo, Osaka, and Aichi on November 3, 16 and 17, 2019, to celebrate the game's 20th anniversary. Sheet music for Chrono Cross tracks arranged for both solo guitar and guitar duets has been released by Procyon Studio.

Chrono Cross's soundtrack has been heavily remixed by fans, sparking several albums. These include the officially licensed Time & Space - A Tribute to Yasunori Mitsuda, released by OneUp Studios on October 7, 2001 and containing 18 remixes over a span of 1:00:58, with a second version of the album released on June 17, 2003. A related popular album release was Radical Dreamers: Thieves of Fate, an unofficial download-only album release by the remix website OverClocked ReMix on January 5, 2008 containing 15 remixes of the soundtrack to Radical Dreamers, including remixes of the tracks that later appeared in Chrono Cross. Selections of remixes also appear on dōjin remix albums, and on English remixing websites such as OverClocked Remix. "Time's Scar" was featured by NPR in a program about classically arranged video game scores in December 2012.
