= Music of Chrono Trigger =

Soundtrack of SNES game Chrono Trigger

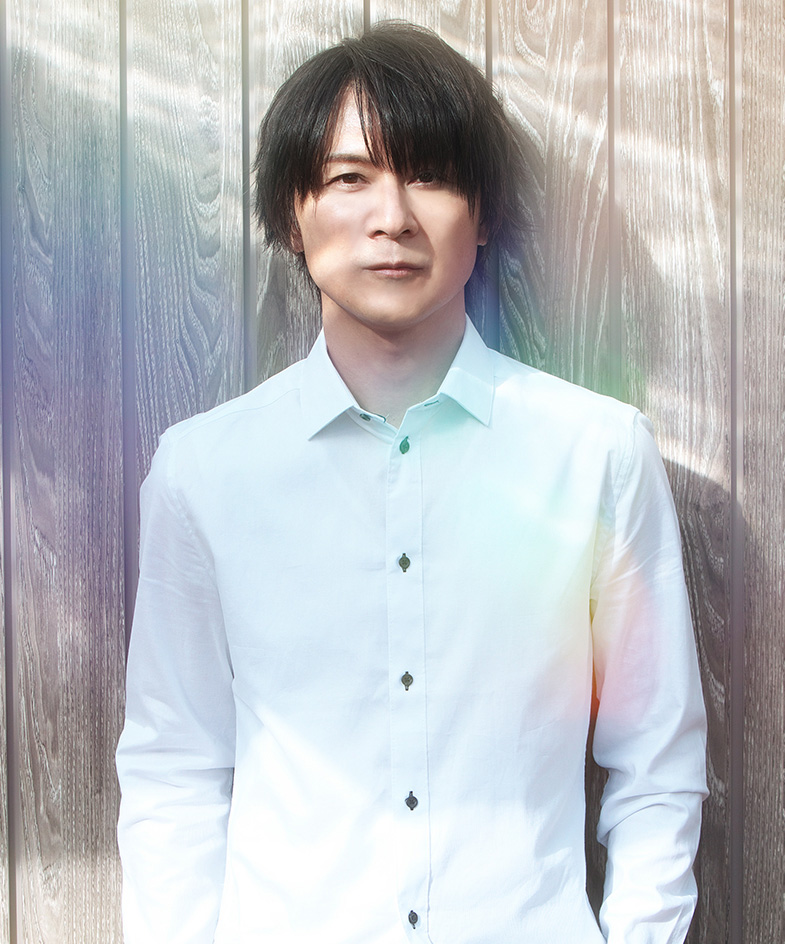
Composer Yasunori Mitsuda

The Chrono series is a video game franchise developed and published by Square Enix (formerly Square). It began in 1995 with the time travel role-playing video game Chrono Trigger, which spawned two continuations, Radical Dreamers and Chrono Cross. The music of Chrono Trigger was composed primarily by Yasunori Mitsuda, with a few tracks composed by regular Final Fantasy composer Nobuo Uematsu. The Chrono Trigger soundtrack has inspired four official album releases by Square Enix: a soundtrack album released by NTT Publishing in 1995 and re-released in 2004; a greatest hits album published by DigiCube in 1999, published in abbreviated form by Tokyopop in 2001, and republished by Square Enix in 2005; an acid jazz arrangement album published and republished by NTT Publishing in 1995 and 2004; and a 2008 orchestral arranged album by Square Enix. Corresponding with the Nintendo DS release of the game, a reissued soundtrack was released in 2009. An arranged album for Chrono Trigger and Chrono Cross, entitled To Far Away Times, was released in 2015 to commemorate the 20 year anniversary of Chrono Trigger.

The original soundtrack has been hailed as one of the best video game soundtracks ever made, and the Original Sound Version album met with similar applause. The reception for the other albums has been mixed, with the releases finding both fans and detractors among reviewers. Pieces from the soundtrack have been played at various orchestral concerts, such as the personal arrangements by Mitsuda for the Play! A Video Game Symphony concert series. Chrono Cross music has also been extensively remixed by fans, and such remixes have been included in both official and unofficial albums.

== Creation and development ==
Chrono Trigger was scored primarily by Yasunori Mitsuda, with assistance by veteran Final Fantasy composer Nobuo Uematsu. A sound programmer at the time, Mitsuda was unhappy with his pay and threatened to leave Square if he could not compose music. Final Fantasy developer Hironobu Sakaguchi, one of the three designers for the upcoming Chrono Trigger, suggested he score the game, remarking, "maybe your salary will go up." Mitsuda reflected, "I wanted to create music that wouldn't fit into any established genre...music of an imaginary world. The game's director, Masato Kato, was my close friend, and so I'd always talk with him about the setting and the scene before going into writing." Mitsuda has said that he was unsure of how to start, saying that he "must've tried to start writing the music 4 times" and that it took "a month and a half" before he knew how to compose the music for Chrono Trigger.

"Chrono Trigger"
Sample of "Chrono Trigger", illustrating the game's aural style and aesthetic.

Mitsuda slept in his studio several nights, and attributed certain tracks, such as "To Far Away Times", to inspiring dreams. He later attributed this track to an idea he was developing before Chrono Trigger, reflecting that the piece was made in dedication to "a certain person with whom I wanted to share a generation." Mitsuda tried to use leitmotifs of the Chrono Trigger main theme to create a sense of consistency in the soundtrack. He also suffered a hard drive crash that lost around forty in-progress tracks. After Mitsuda contracted stomach ulcers, regular Final Fantasy series composer Nobuo Uematsu joined the project to compose ten tracks and finish the score. Mitsuda returned to watch the ending with the staff before the game's release, crying upon seeing the finished scene. Mitsuda considers Chrono Trigger a landmark title which helped his talent mature. While Mitsuda later held that the title piece was "rough around the edges," he maintains that it had "significant influence on my life as a composer." At the time of the game's release, the number of tracks and sound effects was unprecedented, causing the soundtrack to span three discs in its 1995 commercial pressing.

== Albums ==
=== Chrono Trigger: Original Sound Version ===
Chrono Trigger: Original Sound Version

Soundtrack album by Yasunori Mitsuda and Nobuo Uematsu
- Released: March 25, 1995
- Genres: Chiptune; video game music
- Length: 46:33 (disc one); 50:33 (disc two); 53:46 (disc three)
- Labels: NTT; Polystar
- Producers: Yasunori Mitsuda; Mitsunobu Nakamura

Chrono Trigger: Original Sound Version is a soundtrack of the music from Chrono Trigger, produced by Yasunori Mitsuda and Mitsunobu Nakamura. The soundtrack spans three discs and 64 tracks, covering a duration of 2:39:52. It was published by NTT Publishing on March 25, 1995 and re-published on October 1, 2004.

The majority of the tracks were composed by Yasunori Mitsuda, while ten tracks were contributed by Nobuo Uematsu after Mitsuda contracted stomach ulcers. Noriko Matsueda composed one track, "Boss Battle 1", which was arranged by Uematsu. The soundtrack tunes have been described as covering a wide variety of moods, from "simple, light-hearted tunes" like "Spekkio" to "sad themes" like "At The Bottom of Night" and "darker themes" like "Ocean Palace".

The album was well received by reviewers such as Liz Maas of RPGFan, who termed it "well worth its price" and noted that the tracks were very memorable and "always fit the mood in the game". IGN termed it "one of the best videogame soundtracks ever produced" and said that the music was a large part of the game's ability to "capture the emotions of the player". It furthermore called the soundtrack "some of the most memorable tunes in RPG history". The game itself won the "Best Music in a Cartridge-Based Game" award in Electronic Gaming Monthly's 1995 video game awards.

==== Track listings ====
All music is composed by Yasunori Mitsuda, except where noted.

Disc one
No.	Title	Music	Length
1.	"Presentiment" (予感)		0:34
2.	"Chrono Trigger" (クロノ・トリガー)		2:01
3.	"Morning Sunlight" (朝の日ざし)		0:58
4.	"Peaceful Days" (やすらぎの日々)		2:48
5.	"Memories of Green" (みどりの思い出)		3:51
6.	"Guardia Millennial Fair" (ガルディア王国千年祭)		3:17
7.	"Gato's Song" (ゴンザレスのお歌)		0:42
8.	"A Strange Happening" (不思議な出来事)		1:43
9.	"Wind Scene" (風の憧憬)		3:22
10.	"Good Night" (おやすみ)		0:08
11.	"Secret of the Forest" (樹海の神秘)		4:46
12.	"Battle 1" (戦い)		2:29
13.	"Courage and Pride" (ガルディア城 ～勇気と誇り～)		3:28
14.	"Huh!?" (んっ！？)		0:05
15.	"Manoria Cathedral" (マノリア修道院)		1:13
16.	"A Prayer to the Road that Leads" (道行くものへ 祈りを・・・)		0:11
17.	"Silent Light" (沈黙の光)	Nobuo Uematsu	2:23
18.	"Boss Battle 1" (ボス・バトル１)	Noriko Matsueda, Uematsu (arrangement)	1:58
19.	"Frog's Theme" (カエルのテーマ)		1:49
20.	"Fanfare 1" (ファンファーレ１)		1:16
21.	"Kingdom Trial" (王国裁判)		3:44
22.	"The Hidden Truth" (隠された事実)		0:59
23.	"A Shot of Crisis" (危機一髪)		2:39
Total length:			46:33

Disc two
No.	Title	Music	Length
1.	"Ruined World" (荒れ果てた世界)		3:24
2.	"Mystery of the Past" (過去の謎)	Uematsu	0:07
3.	"Lab 16's Ruin" (16号廃墟)		1:34
4.	"People Without Hope" (生きる望みをすてた人々)	Uematsu	3:07
5.	"Lavos' Theme" (ラヴォスのテーマ)		5:10
6.	"The Day the World Revived" (世界最期の日)		1:25
7.	"Robo Gang Johnny" (暴走ロボ軍団ジョニー)		2:21
8.	"Bike Chase" (バイクチェイス)	Uematsu	1:35
9.	"Robo's Theme" (ロボのテーマ)		1:32
10.	"Remains of the Factory" (工場跡)		3:09
11.	"Battle 2" (戦い2; unreleased track)		2:10
12.	"Fanfare 2" (ファンファーレ２)		0:07
13.	"Brink of Time" (時の最果て)		2:31
14.	"Delightful Spekkio" (愉快なスペッキオ)		2:48
15.	"Fanfare 3" (ファンファーレ３)		0:05
16.	"Underground Sewer" (地下水道)	Uematsu	2:24
17.	"Boss Battle 2" (ボス・バトル２)		2:41
18.	"Primitive Mountain" (原始の山)	Uematsu	3:07
19.	"Ayla's Theme" (エイラのテーマ)		1:24
20.	"Rhythm of Wind, Sky, and Earth" (風と空と大地のリズム)		1:51
21.	"Burn! Bobonga!" (燃えよ！ボボンガ！)	Uematsu	2:12
22.	"Magus' Castle" (魔王城)		0:29
23.	"Confusing Melody" (錯乱の旋律)		1:40
24.	"Battle with Magus" (魔王決戦)		3:30
Total length:			50:33

Disc three
No.	Title	Music	Length
1.	"Singing Mountain" (歌う山; unreleased track)		3:05
2.	"Tyran Castle" (ティラン城)	Uematsu	3:49
3.	"At the Bottom of Night" (夜の底にて)		2:31
4.	"Corridors of Time" (時の回廊)		3:01
5.	"Zeal Palace" (ジール宮殿)		3:57
6.	"Schala's Theme" (サラのテーマ)		2:48
7.	"Sealed Door" (封印の扉)	Uematsu	2:47
8.	"Undersea Palace" (海底神殿)		3:23
9.	"Far Off Promise" (クロノとマール ～遠い約束～)		1:56
10.	"Wings That Cross Time" (シルバード ～時を渡る翼～)		3:23
11.	"Black Omen" (黒の夢)		3:04
12.	"Determination" (決意)		0:56
13.	"World Revolution" (世界変革の時)		3:48
14.	"Last Battle" (ラストバトル)		4:07
15.	"First Festival of Stars" (星の祝祭)		2:44
16.	"Epilogue - To Good Friends" (エピローグ ～親しき仲間へ～)		2:34
17.	"To Far Away Times" (遥かなる時の彼方へ)		5:46
Total length:			53:46

=== Chrono Trigger Arranged Version: The Brink of Time ===
Cover artwork for Chrono Trigger Arranged Version: The Brink of Time

Chrono Trigger Arranged Version: The Brink of Time is an album of acid jazz rearrangements of the music from Chrono Trigger, arranged and performed by GUIDO (Hiroshi Hata and Hidenobu Ootsuki). The soundtrack spans one disc and 10 tracks, covering a duration of 52:47. It was published by NTT Publishing on June 25, 1995, and reprinted on October 1, 2004.

The Brink of Time came about because Mitsuda wanted to do something that no one else was doing, and he noted that acid jazz and its related genres were uncommon in the Japanese market. It was the first album for which Mitsuda had to work with live recordings. The cover art of the album depicts a plate of fried eggs between a fork, knife and glass, while the inside booklet depicts a rooster which was specifically brought into the studio for the photo shooting. Several eggs had to be fried before the designers could settle on the correct shape. Mitsuda has stated that Ootsuki's arrangement technique left a strong impact on him and notably influenced his next score, the soundtrack to Front Mission: Gun Hazard.

"Zeal Palace"
Sample of "Zeal Palace" from The Brink of Time, demonstrating the acid-jazz style of the arranged album.

The album received mixed reviews from critics. Freddie W. of RPGFan, while calling the album "pretty good" overall, said that several of the tracks including "Zeal Palace" and "Warlock Battle" were "absolutely horrible" due to the "disgustingly bad" distorted guitars. He cited the overuse of guitars as the worst part of the album. Simon of Square Enix Music Online had a different reaction; he enjoyed the guitars in the tracks and said that the album had "skill, class, and a feel that's relatively original". He concluded, however, that he could not seem to "connect" with the album, and that the CD was "very much down to personal taste — a love or hate arrangement".

No.	Title	Length
1.	"Chrono Trigger" (クロノ・トリガー)	6:13
2.	"Secret of the Forest" (樹海の神秘)	6:10
3.	"Zeal Palace" (ジール宮殿)	4:46
4.	"Battle with Magus" (魔王決戦)	3:46
5.	"Corridors of Time" (時の回廊)	7:15
6.	"Undersea Palace" (海底神殿)	4:09
7.	"World Revolution" (世界変革の時 ~ラストバトル)	6:03
8.	"Brink of Time" (時の最果て)	2:45
9.	"Guardia Millennial Fair" (ガルディア王国千年祭)	6:28
10.	"To Far Away Times" (遥かなる時の彼方へ)	5:08

=== Chrono Trigger Original Soundtrack ===
Chrono Trigger Original Soundtrack, also referred to as "Chrono Trigger '99" or "Chrono Trigger PSX OST", is a greatest hits album featuring 21 tracks from Chrono Trigger Original Sound Version and nine arranged tracks from the release of Chrono Trigger for the PlayStation. The arranged tracks come from the cutscenes added to the game, while Tsuyoshi Sekito composed four new pieces for the game's bonus features that weren't included on the soundtrack. The album was released by DigiCube on December 18, 1999 to coincide with the PlayStation release and re-released by Square Enix on February 23, 2005. The album is 1:14:12 long and spans 30 tracks.

A version of the album was re-published by Tokyopop in North America as Chrono Trigger Official Soundtrack: Music From Final Fantasy Chronicles on August 21, 2001, to coincide with the release of the Final Fantasy Chronicles collection of Final Fantasy IV and Chrono Trigger. The first 21 tracks of the album out of 25 were identical to Chrono Trigger Original Soundtrack, while the next three tracks corresponded to tracks 22, 23, and 29 of the Original Soundtrack and the final track was the same as the first track of Brink of Time. This version of the album is 1:13:03 long.

Original Soundtrack received mixed reviews by critics. Ryan Mattich of RPGFan termed it "an excellent selection of music", primarily due to the arranged tracks, saying that the Original Sound Version album's tracks were better than this version's as they were looped and thus played longer. Patrick Gann was disparaging of the North American version of the CD, however, saying that its shortened track list destroyed the main reason to buy the album. Don Kotowski of Square Enix Music Online was dismissive of the Original Soundtrack album, saying that while the Original Sound Version tracks truly represented the "best of" the game's soundtrack, the arranged tracks were "either too short, too much like the original, or lifeless compared to the original", giving no incentive to purchase the album over the Original Sound Version.

No.	Title	Length
1.	"Presentiment" (予感)	0:36
2.	"Chrono Trigger" (クロノ・トリガー)	2:33
3.	"Peaceful Days" (やすらぎの日々)	2:45
4.	"Guardia Millenial Fair" (ガルディア王国千年祭)	3:18
5.	"Wind Scene" (風の憧憬)	3:21
6.	"Secret of the Forest" (樹海の神秘)	4:47
7.	"Frog's Theme" (カエルのテーマ)	1:17
8.	"Kingdom Trial" (王国裁判)	3:45
9.	"Lavos' Theme" (ラヴォスのテーマ)	5:10
10.	"Robo Gang Johnny" (暴走ロボ軍団ジョニー)	1:43
11.	"Robo's Theme" (ロボのテーマ)	1:31
12.	"Brink of Time" (時の最果て)	2:32
13.	"Delightful Spekkio" (愉快なスペッキオ)	2:47
14.	"Battle with Magus" (魔王決戦)	2:44
15.	"Corridors of Time" (時の回廊)	3:02
16.	"Zeal Palace" (ジール宮殿)	3:58
17.	"Schala's Theme" (サラのテーマ)	2:44
18.	"Undersea Palace" (海底神殿)	3:20
19.	"World Revolution" (世界変革の時)	3:52
20.	"Epilogue - To Good Friends" (エピローグ ～親しき仲間へ～)	2:26
21.	"To Far Away Times" (遥かなる時の彼方へ)	4:15
22.	"Far Off Promise" (クロノとマール ~遠い約束~; arrange version 1)	0:38
23.	"Chrono Trigger" (クロノ・トリガー; arrange version 1)	2:03
24.	"Ayla's Theme" (エイラのテーマ; arrange version)	1:31
25.	"Frog's Theme" (カエルのテーマ; arrange version)	2:00
26.	"Chrono Trigger" (クロノ・トリガー; arrange version 2)	0:35
27.	"Chrono Trigger" (クロノ・トリガー; arrange version 3)	0:27
28.	"Schala's Theme" (サラのテーマ; arrange version)	1:40
29.	"Ending - Burn! Bobonga! - Frog's Theme - To Far Away Times" (エンディング ～燃えよ！ボボンガ！～カエルのテーマ～遥かなる時の彼方へ～; arrange version)	1:04
30.	"Far Off Promise" (クロノとマール ～遠い約束～;l arrange version 2)	0:39

=== Chrono Trigger Orchestra Extra Soundtrack ===
Chrono Trigger Orchestra Extra Soundtrack is an album of orchestral arrangements of Chrono Trigger pieces, arranged by Natsumi Kameoka. Published by Square Enix on November 20, 2008 exclusively as a pre-order bonus of the Nintendo DS port of Chrono Trigger, this soundtrack consists of two tracks, "Chrono Trigger ~Orchestra Version~" and "Chrono Trigger Medley ~Orchestra Version~", the latter spanning the pieces "A Premonition", "Guardia's Millennial Fair", "Yearnings of the Wind", "Frog's Theme", "Battle with Magus", "Epilogue ~To Good Friends~", and "To Far Away Times". Mitsuda expressed difficulty in selecting the pieces for the orchestral medley, eventually picking a track from each era and certain character themes. While both tracks involve a full orchestra, "Chrono Trigger" is more heavily horn-based, while "Medley" relies more on stringed instruments. The album as a whole has a length of 6:18.

The album has been described as showing that Mitsuda was "well ahead of the curve" when he composed the Chrono Trigger soundtrack. IGN described "Chrono Trigger ~Orchestra Version~" as having a heavy 1970's influence and as being "a testament to Mitsuda's compositional skills", while calling "Chrono Trigger Medley ~Orchestra Version~" "playfully romantic" with "a fairy tale element" in the beginning of the piece that later transforms into "an entirely more grandiose arena". Patrick Gann described the soundtrack as "awesome" and said that "Kameoka is really good at orchestral arrangement". His primary complaint was the length of the album, as he wished it had been a full album instead of a "mini-album" of only two tracks.

No.	Title	Length
1.	"Chrono Trigger ~Orchestra Version~" (クロノ・トリガー 〜Orchestra Version〜)	2:08
2.	"Chrono Trigger Medley ~Orchestra Version~" (クロノ・トリガーメドレー 〜Orchestra Version〜)	4:11

=== Chrono Trigger Original Soundtrack (2009 release) ===
Chrono Trigger Original Soundtrack is a Square-Enix re-release of the Chrono Trigger Original Sound Version soundtrack that was made available for purchase on July 29, 2009. This soundtrack corresponds to the Nintendo DS version of Chrono Trigger, with different instrumentation from the original Super NES version. The 3-disc soundtrack contains additional tracks from the PlayStation version of the game, some of which were included in the 1999 Chrono Trigger Original Soundtrack album, as well as a bonus DVD containing an interview with Mitsuda and music videos for the two tracks that were on the Orchestra Extra mini-album.

"Wind Scene (1995/2009)"
Samples of "Wind Scene" from the 1995 and 2009 soundtracks, illustrating the different synths used between the two.

The album was well-received by RPGFan reviewer Patrick Gann, who regarded it as the most definitive release of music from the game. He suspected, however that the main purpose of the album was to publish a version by Square Enix's own label rather than the original's NTT Publishing, and concluded that the additional tracks did not make the album worth getting for people who already had the original.

==== Track listings ====
All music is composed by Yasunori Mitsuda, except where noted.

Disc one
No.	Title	Music	Length
1.	"Presentiment" (予感)		0:34
2.	"Chrono Trigger" (クロノ・トリガー)		2:33
3.	"Morning Sunlight" (朝の日ざし)		0:39
4.	"Peaceful Days" (やすらぎの日々)		2:55
5.	"Memories of Green" (みどりの思い出)		3:48
6.	"Guardia Millennial Fair" (ガルディア王国千年祭)		3:27
7.	"Gato's Song" (ゴンザレスのお歌)		0:41
8.	"A Strange Happening" (不思議な出来事)		1:47
9.	"Wind Scene" (風の憧憬)		3:24
10.	"Good Night" (おやすみ)		0:09
11.	"Secret of the Forest" (樹海の神秘)		4:56
12.	"Battle 1" (戦い)		1:49
13.	"Courage and Pride" (ガルディア城 ～勇気と誇り～)		3:30
14.	"Huh!?" (んっ！？)		0:07
15.	"Manoria Cathedral" (マノリア修道院)		0:46
16.	"A Prayer to the Road that Leads" (道行くものへ 祈りを・・・)		0:13
17.	"Silent Light" (沈黙の光)	Nobuo Uematsu	2:25
18.	"Boss Battle 1" (ボス・バトル１)	Noriko Matsueda, Uematsu (arrangement)	1:26
19.	"Frog's Theme" (カエルのテーマ)		1:23
20.	"Fanfare 1" (ファンファーレ１)		0:49
21.	"Kingdom Trial" (王国裁判)		3:55
22.	"The Hidden Truth" (隠された事実)		1:10
23.	"A Shot of Crisis" (危機一髪)		2:08
24.	"Far Off Promise" (arrange version 1)		0:39
25.	"Chrono Trigger" (arrange version 1)		2:04
26.	"Ayla's Theme" (arrange version)		1:32
27.	"Frog's Theme" (arrange version)		1:59
Total length:			50:50

Disc two
No.	Title	Music	Length
1.	"Ruined World" (荒れ果てた世界)		2:40
2.	"Mystery of the Past" (過去の謎)	Uematsu	0:08
3.	"Lab 16's Ruin" (16号廃墟)		1:38
4.	"People Without Hope" (生きる望みをすてた人々)	Uematsu	3:09
5.	"Lavos' Theme" (ラヴォスのテーマ)		5:06
6.	"The Day the World Revived" (世界最期の日)		1:22
7.	"Robo Gang Johnny" (暴走ロボ軍団ジョニー)		1:36
8.	"Bike Chase" (バイクチェイス)	Uematsu	1:12
9.	"Robo's Theme" (ロボのテーマ)		1:34
10.	"Remains of the Factory" (工場跡)		3:12
11.	"Battle 2" (戦い2; unreleased track)		1:37
12.	"Fanfare 2" (ファンファーレ２)		0:09
13.	"Brink of Time" (時の最果て)		2:33
14.	"Delightful Spekkio" (愉快なスペッキオ)		2:43
15.	"Fanfare 3" (ファンファーレ３)		0:08
16.	"Underground Sewer" (地下水道)	Uematsu	2:32
17.	"Boss Battle 2" (ボス・バトル２)		2:15
18.	"Primitive Mountain" (原始の山)	Uematsu	3:13
19.	"Ayla's Theme" (エイラのテーマ)		1:34
20.	"Rhythm of Wind, Sky, and Earth" (風と空と大地のリズム)		1:56
21.	"Burn! Bobonga!" (燃えよ！ボボンガ！)	Uematsu	1:35
22.	"Magus' Castle" (魔王城)		0:29
23.	"Confusing Melody" (錯乱の旋律)		1:29
24.	"Battle with Magus" (魔王決戦)		2:51
25.	"Chrono Trigger" (arrange version 2)		0:36
26.	"Chrono Trigger" (arrange version 3)		0:28
27.	"Schala's Theme" (arrange version)		1:39
Total length:			49:24

Disc three
No.	Title	Music	Length
1.	"Singing Mountain" (歌う山; unreleased track)		4:02
2.	"Tyran Castle" (ティラン城)	Uematsu	3:49
3.	"At the Bottom of Night" (夜の底にて)		2:35
4.	"Corridors of Time" (時の回廊)		3:03
5.	"Zeal Palace" (ジール宮殿)		3:58
6.	"Schala's Theme" (サラのテーマ)		2:54
7.	"Sealed Door" (封印の扉)	Uematsu	2:57
8.	"Undersea Palace" (海底神殿)		3:22
9.	"Far Off Promise" (クロノとマール ～遠い約束～)		1:54
10.	"Wings That Cross Time" (シルバード ～時を渡る翼～)		3:26
11.	"Black Omen" (黒の夢)		3:08
12.	"Determination" (決意)		0:55
13.	"World Revolution" (世界変革の時)		4:07
14.	"Last Battle" (ラストバトル)		3:45
15.	"First Festival of Stars" (星の祝祭)		2:31
16.	"Epilogue – To Good Friends" (エピローグ ～親しき仲間へ～)		2:21
17.	"To Far Away Times" (遥かなる時の彼方へ)		4:28
18.	"Ending - Burn! Bobonga! – Frog's Theme – To Far Away Times" (エンディング ～燃えよ！ボボンガ！～カエルのテーマ～遥かなる時の彼方へ～; arrange version *)		2:14
19.	"Far Off Promise" (クロノとマール ～遠い約束～ arrange version 2 *)		0:46
20.	"One Sunny Day When We Met"		3:22
21.	"Scattering Blossoms"		3:12
22.	"A Meeting with Destiny"		3:10
23.	"Time to Rest ~After the Battle~"		3:43
24.	"Extras Mode ~Frog's Theme Intro Plus~"		1:48
Total length:			69:48

=== To Far Away Times: Chrono Trigger & Chrono Cross Arrangement Album ===
On a live performance at the Tokyo Dome in July 2015 commemorating the 20 year anniversary of Chrono Trigger, Mitsuda announced that the long requested Chrono series arrangement album, entitled To Far Away Times: Chrono Trigger & Chrono Cross Arrangement Album would be released. This was eventually released by Square Enix Music on October 14, 2015.

No.	Title	Length
1.	"Time's Scar" (arranged by Tomohiko Kira / lyrics & vocal: Koko Komine)	4:47
2.	"Radical Dreamers" (arranged by Sachiko Miyano / lyrics & vocal: Sarah Àlainn)	5:31
3.	"Wind Scene" (arranged by Kumi Tanioka & Sachiko Miyano)	4:28
4.	"Schala's Theme" (arranged by Yasunori Mitsuda & Laura Shigihara / lyrics & vocal: Laura Shigihara)	4:07
5.	"The Frozen Flame" (arranged by Natsumi Kameoka)	3:21
6.	"Marbule" (composed & arranged by Yasunori Mitsuda)	4:01
7.	"The Bend of Time" (arranged by Natsumi Kameoka)	3:35
8.	"Corridors of Time" (arranged by Yasunori Mitsuda & Laura Shigihara / lyrics & vocal: Laura Shigihara)	3:54
9.	"On The Other Side" (arranged by Kazune Ogihara & Laura Shigihara / lyrics & vocal: Laura Shigihara)	4:12
10.	"To Far Away Times" (arranged by Sachiko Miyano / lyrics & vocal: Sarah Àlainn)	4:36
Total length:		42:32

=== Chrono Orchestra ===
In 2019, Square Enix held a pair of concerts by the Tokyo Philharmonic Orchestra in Osaka on September 7 and in Tokyo on October 27, featuring music from Chrono Trigger and Chrono Cross. On September 4, 2019, Square Enix released the album Chrono Trigger Orchestral Arrangement, containing eight tracks arranged by Kosuke Yamashita, Mariam Abounnasr, Daisuke Shinoda, and Tomomichi Takeoka, and performed by the Tokyo Philharmonic Orchestra. A box set containing the album, a similar album of orchestral arrangements for Chrono Cross, and a bonus disc of two piano duet arrangements for each game was also released. The album and box set were reviewed by Tien Hoang of VGMOnline, who found it to be a short album of "pleasant but unambitious" arrangements that stuck closely to the original compositions. He found the piano arrangements in the box set to be better, but uneven.

=== Chrono Trigger Piano Soundscape Arrangement ===
The Chrono Trigger Piano Soundscape Arrangement was published in 2025 as part of the 30th anniversary of Chrono Trigger. It consists of piano arrangements of tracks of Chrono Trigger, albeit with post-processing rather than being a "pure" piano experience. The album was arranged by Shogo Nomura and Sachiko Miyano. Patrick Gann of RPGFan thought that while the album was not necessarily an all-time favorite of Chrono arrangements, he admired its unique take in the "soundscape" processing of the piano tunes, and that it was re-listenable without growing old.

=== Chrono Trigger Orchestral Concert: Melodies Across Time ===
A live orchestral performance of Melodies Across Time, including other tracks

Chrono Trigger Orchestral Concert: Melodies Across Time is both a concert of tracks arranged for orchestra, as well as an album consisting of recordings of the concert. Some of the tracks are shared with the 2019 orchestral album, but the overlaps largely have new arrangements.

Patrick Gann of RPGFan thought that the arrangements in Melodies Across Time were largely superior to the ones in the 2019 album, and appreciated the ambition in attempting to make pieces such as "Lab 16's Ruin" and "Last Battle" work well for an orchestra.

Chrono Trigger Orchestral Concert: Melodies Across Time
No.	Title	Length
1.	"Presentiment - Chrono Trigger"	2:39
2.	"Secret of the Forest - Wind Scene"	5:13
3.	"Courage and Pride - Frog's Theme"	5:11
4.	"Lab 16's Ruin - Robo's Theme"	3:03
5.	"The Day the World Revived - Lavos' Theme"	5:58
6.	"Brink of Time - Delightful Spekkio - Fanfare 3"	4:39
7.	"Primitive Mountain - Ayla's Theme"	4:26
8.	"Determination - Wings That Cross Time"	3:52
9.	"World Revolution - Last Battle"	4:59
10.	"To Far Away Times"	5:27
Total length:		45:27

== Covers and adaptations ==
Music from Chrono Trigger Original Sound Version has been arranged for the piano and published as sheet music by DOREMI Music Publishing. Chrono Trigger's soundtrack has been heavily remixed by fans, sparking several albums. These include the officially licensed Time & Space - A Tribute to Yasunori Mitsuda, released by OneUp Studios on October 7, 2001 and containing 18 remixes over a span of 1:00:58, with a second version of the album released on June 17, 2003. In 2009, another album, "Chronotorious", was released by the same band under the name "Bad Dudes". Another album release was Chrono Symphonic, an unofficial download-only album release by the remix website OverClocked ReMix on January 3, 2006 containing 25 remixes over 2 "discs". Selections of remixes also appear on Japanese remix albums, called Dōjin, and on English remixing websites such as OverClocked Remix. In 2013, Video game composer Blake Robinson officially licensed the compositions and released his new arrangements as "The Chrono Trigger Symphony". Volume 1, 2 and 3 are available for paid download from iTunes and Loudr.

== Live performances ==
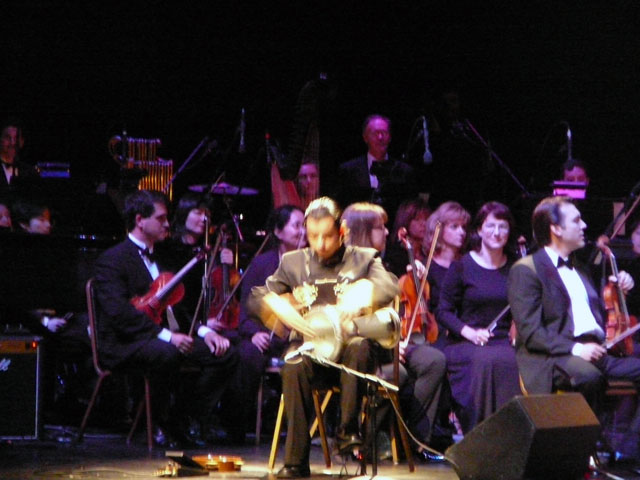
Rony Barrak during the Chrono symphonic suite at the Play! concert

The main theme of Chrono Trigger was played at the fifth of the Orchestral Game Music Concerts in 1996, and released on an accompanying album. Mitsuda has arranged versions of music from Chrono Trigger for Play! A Video Game Symphony video game music concerts in 2006, presenting the main theme, Frog's Theme, and To Far Away Times. Music from the game has also been performed in other video game concert tours such as the Video Games Live concert series and in concerts by the Eminence Orchestra. Music from Chrono Trigger and Cross made up one fourth of the music in the Symphonic Fantasies concerts in Cologne in September 2009 which were produced by the creators of the Symphonic Game Music Concert series and conducted by Arnie Roth. The concerts featured a suite of music from both games interspersed together with the pieces from Trigger comprising "A Premonition", "Battle with Magus", "Chrono Trigger", "Peaceful Days", "Outskirts of Time", "Frog's Theme", and "To Far Away Times", as well as a boss battle suite that featured "Lavos’ Theme". "Crono's Theme" was performed at the Press Start -Symphony of Games- 2007 concerts in Yokohama and Osaka, Japan, and a suite comprising music from Chrono Trigger and Cross was performed at the Press Start -Symphony of Games- 2008 concerts the following year in Tokyo and Shanghai. An arrangement of "Light of Silence" was performed on July 9, 2011 at the Symphonic Odysseys concert, which commemorated the music of Uematsu.

For the 20th anniversary in 2015, Mitsuda, along with his performing group Millennial Fair, performed tracks from the game at the Tokyo Globe in Tokyo, Japan on July 25 and 26. The event, titled "The Brink of Time", included Mitsuda performing on the piano, guitar, and Irish bouzouki. "Frog's Theme" and "Robo's Theme" were among the video game music performed during the 2020 Summer Olympics opening ceremony.
