= Soraya Saga =

Japanese illustrator, designer and video game story writer

- 嵯峨 空哉
- Born: April 18, 1969 (age 56); Japan
- Occupations: Video game story writer, illustrator, and designer
- Spouse: Tetsuya Takahashi

Kaori Tanaka (田中 香, Tanaka Kaori; born April 18, 1969), also known by her pen name Soraya Saga (嵯峨 空哉, Saga Soraya), is a Japanese freelance illustrator, designer, and video game story writer.

== Biography ==
=== Final Fantasy ===
Saga joined Squaresoft as a graphic designer in the early 1990s through an advertisement in ASCII computer magazine. Saga was a graphic designer at Squaresoft for Final Fantasy IV: Easy Type, Romancing SaGa, Final Fantasy V, and Final Fantasy VI, She helped create the characterization for Final Fantasy VI characters Edgar and Sabin, beginning by choosing two playable character classes, in this case monk and machinist, choosing the desert as a setting, and then creating an extensive character background in a private booklet for herself.

=== Xenogears/Xenosaga ===
Saga and her husband Tetsuya Takahashi submitted a script for Final Fantasy VII which was called "too dark" and "complicated" for a fantasy game, but were allowed to start a new project based on the script, which was worked into a full treatment with cutscenes, eventually being released under the name Xenogears. The story was inspired by the writing pair's interest in Jung, Nietzsche, and Freud, addressing questions of "where do we come from, what are we, where are we going". Saga and Takahashi went on to write the plot of Xenosaga Episode I, Xenosaga Episode II, and Xenosaga Pied Piper. Xenosaga's use of many religious references reflected Saga's interest in belief and its power. KOS-MOS was designed by Takahashi, reflecting a reversed view of human construction, giving the character a powerful body and fragile soul. Several designs that were not used were created by designers Kunihiko Tanaka and Kouichi Mugitani. Originally intended to be six games, the series was cut short, and many plot points had to be changed and moved because of the second episode's plot.

At some point during the production of Xenosaga Episode II, Saga was informed that her services would no longer be needed in the production of the remaining installments of the series.

=== Later works ===
She also helped develop the story for Soma Bringer. She also did a draft for Monolith Soft in 2000 for a sci-fi RPG called "Titus 12".

In December 2025, she announced her retirement from video game writing in order to take care of a family member.

== Games ==
- Final Fantasy V (1992): map design
- Final Fantasy VI (1994): field graphic designer, script
- Romancing SaGa 3 (1995): graphic designer
- Xenogears (1998): scenario writer
- Xenosaga Episode I: Der Wille zur Macht (2002): event scenario writer
- Xenosaga Episode II: Jenseits von Gut und Böse (2004): assistant author
- Xenosaga: Pied Piper (2004): script co-author
- Soma Bringer (2008): scenario
- Xenoblade Chronicles 2 (2017): guest artist
