= Yasunori Mitsuda =

Japanese composer (born 1972)

- 光田 康典
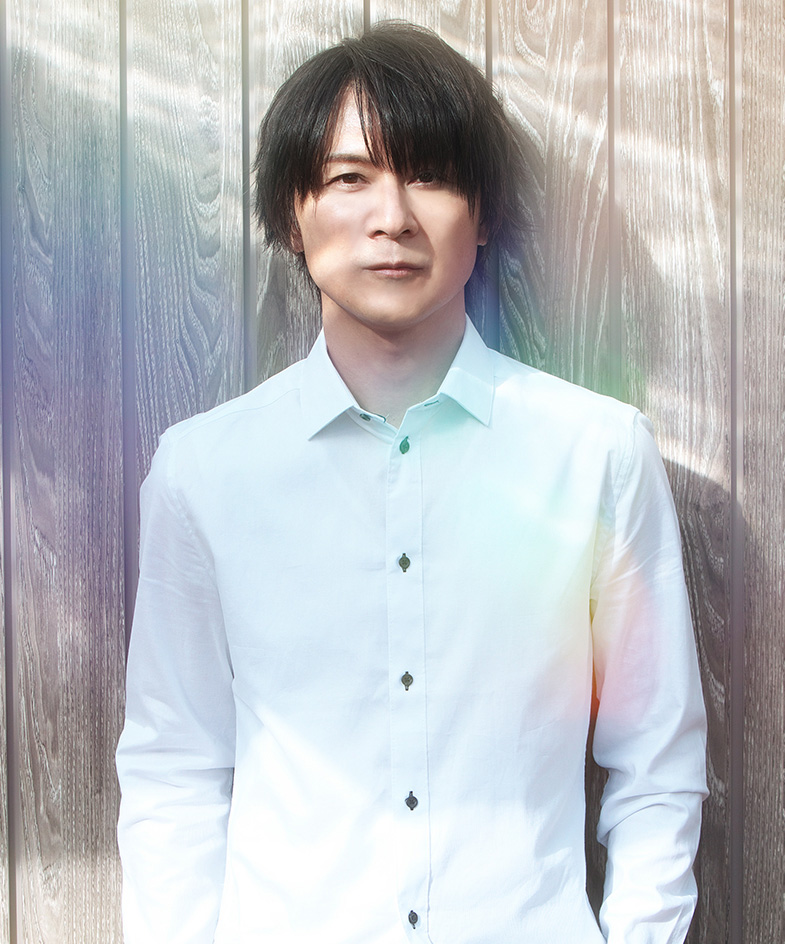
- Mitsuda in 2019
- Born: January 21, 1972 (age 54); Tokuyama, Yamaguchi, Japan
- Occupations: Composer; musician
- Years active: 1994–present
- Employer: Square (1992–1998)
- Musical career
- Genres: Video game; world; orchestral; vocal
- Instruments: Piano; guitar
- Label: Sleigh Bells

Yasunori Mitsuda (光田 康典, Mitsuda Yasunori; born January 21, 1972) is a Japanese composer. He is best known for his work in video games, primarily for the Chrono, Xeno, Shadow Hearts, and Inazuma Eleven franchises, among various others. Mitsuda founded a music production studio and record company, Procyon Studio and Sleigh Bells, in 2001.

Mitsuda joined Square upon graduation in 1992. He worked there designing sound effects for two years before being assigned his debut project in Chrono Trigger (1995). Mitsuda went on to compose for several other games at Square, including Xenogears (1998) and Chrono Cross (1999). He left the company and became independent in 1998. Mitsuda has also worked on anime series, films, and television programs. His music in Chrono Trigger, Xenogears, and Chrono Cross has since been cited as among the best in video games.

== Biography ==
=== Early life ===
Mitsuda was born in Tokuyama, Japan, on January 21, 1972, and was raised in the Kumage District of Yamaguchi Prefecture. He took piano lessons beginning at the age of five, but was more interested in sports at the time and did not take music seriously, quitting by the age of six. For a while, he wanted to become a professional golfer. By high school, Mitsuda wanted to become a music composer, inspired by Vangelis' Blade Runner and Henry Mancini's The Pink Panther film scores. He became interested in PCs after his father bought him one, which was a rare item at the time. He started to program computer games and compose music for them, as well as take more technically oriented classes.

After high school, Mitsuda decided to leave town and become independent. With encouragement from his father and sister, he moved to Tokyo and enrolled in the Junior College of Music. Despite the school's low prestige, Mitsuda received solid instruction from his professors, most of them practicing musicians who would take Mitsuda to gigs with them to help carry and set up equipment. At the cost of being used for free physical labor, Mitsuda got a first-hand view of the Japanese music world and valuable training both in and out of the classroom. As part of his college course, he was granted an intern position at the game development studio Wolf Team studying under composer Motoi Sakuraba. With his school term ending, Mitsuda saw an advertisement for sound production at Square in a copy of Famitsu. With no plans as to what he wanted to do after school, he applied for the position and joined the company in April 1992.

=== Career ===
Although his official job title was as a composer, Mitsuda found himself working more as a sound engineer. Over the next two years, he created sound effects for Hanjuku Hero, Final Fantasy V, Secret of Mana, and Romancing SaGa 2. In 1994, realizing that he would never get a chance to move up to a real composition duty without some drastic action and feeling concerned about his low pay, he gave Square's vice president, Hironobu Sakaguchi, an ultimatum: let him compose, or he would quit. Sakaguchi assigned the young musician to the team working on Chrono Trigger, telling him that "after you finish it, maybe your salary will go up". Mitsuda was assigned as the sole composer for the game, in the end creating 54 tracks for the final release. Mitsuda drove himself to work hard on the score, frequently working until he passed out, and would awake with ideas for songs such as the ending theme for the game. He worked himself so hard that he developed stomach ulcers and had to be hospitalized, which led Nobuo Uematsu to finish the remaining tracks for him.

Chrono Trigger proved a great success, and the soundtrack proved popular with fans. Mitsuda claims that it is his "landmark" title, which "matured" him. He attributes its success to folk and jazz music, rather than the "semi-orchestral" style popular in game music at the time. Following Chrono Trigger, Mitsuda composed the soundtrack for Front Mission: Gun Hazard, again with Uematsu. According to Uematsu, Mitsuda again worked so much that he eventually defecated blood out of stress and physical problems. Mitsuda worked on three more titles for Square: Tobal No. 1 and Radical Dreamers: Nusumenai Hōseki both in 1996, and Xenogears in 1998, which featured the first ballad in a Square game, the Celtic ending theme "Small Two of Pieces" sung by Joanne Hogg. Mitsuda also during this period produced albums of arranged music of his original scores, creating acid jazz remixes in Chrono Trigger Arranged Version: The Brink of Time and a Celtic arrangement album of Xenogears music, Creid. In July 1998, following up on what he had said in his original interview with the company, Mitsuda left Square to work as a freelance composer, the first of several of Square's composers to do so.

Following his leaving, Mitsuda has only worked on one more original game with Square, composing for 1999's Chrono Cross, a sequel to Chrono Trigger. He has worked on over a dozen games since then, including the spiritual sequel to Xenogears, Xenosaga Episode I: Der Wille zur Macht, and major games such as Shadow Hearts and Luminous Arc. In addition to video games, Mitsuda has composed music for the anime Inazuma Eleven and for the independent album Kirite. On November 22, 2001, Mitsuda formed Procyon Studio as a company to produce his music, along with a record label, Sleigh Bells. The company consisted of only Mitsuda as composer along with a few sound producers for several years but has since expanded to include other composers. Mitsuda and Procyon Studio have also produced more arranged albums, such as Sailing to the World and 2009's Colours of Light, a compilation album of vocal pieces Mitsuda had composed. The studio was also involved in co-designing the KORG DS-10 synthesizer program for the Nintendo DS, and its successor for the Nintendo 3DS, KORG M01D.

By the late 2000s, Mitsuda began working as a producer for a team of artists. Scores in the 2010s include the Inazuma Eleven series, Soul Sacrifice, and Valkyria Revolution, with the latter marking his first fully solo game soundtrack in nearly a decade. Around the same time, Mitsuda also began to compose for non-video game media, including several NHK-produced television shows, as well as anime series such as Black Butler and adaptions of Inazuma Eleven. In addition to serving as the lead composer for 2017's Xenoblade Chronicles 2, he also was in charge of the game's audio budget, musician booking, schedule management, and music sheet proofreading, for which he claimed was the largest project he ever worked on. He also composed for its expansion pack, Torna – The Golden Country, and Xenoblade Chronicles 3.

== Musical style and influences ==
Mitsuda claims to compose by "just fool[ing] around on my keyboard" and letting the melodies come to him. He also sometimes comes up with songs while asleep, including the ending theme to Chrono Trigger and "Bonds of Sea and Fire" from Xenogears, though his main inspiration is visual items, "paintings or other things". His music is frequently minimalistic, and he has cited Minimalism as an influence. His final battle themes for Chrono Trigger and Xenogears are based on only a few chords each, with the latter containing only two. Mitsuda has listened to a great number of musical genres throughout his life, which he learned from his father, and is especially inspired by jazz music. He grew up listening to artists such as jazz musician Art Blakey, electronic music band Yellow Magic Orchestra, and instrumental rock group The Ventures before exploring classical music. He is also inspired by Celtic music, and has created two albums of music in that style. His soundtrack for Chrono Trigger also shows the influence of Asian music, including the sounds of Japanese shakuhachi flutes, Indian tabla drums and the sitar. He has cited Maurice Ravel, J.S. Bach, Pyotr Tchaikovsky, Claude Debussy, Robert Schumann, Antonín Dvořák, and Gustav Holst as his favorite classical composers, claiming that his modern influences are too numerous to name as he listens to so much music.

Mitsuda names his favorite works as the soundtracks to the Chrono series, Xenogears, Xenosaga Episode I, and the original album Kirite, though he also says that all of his soundtracks are "representational works", as they represent who he was as a composer when he made them. His favorite pieces overall are "The Girl Who Closed Her Heart" and "Pain" from Xenosaga Episode I and pieces from Kirite. When he starts to compose a soundtrack, he first takes one month to gather information and artwork about the game world and scenario, so that his music will fit in with the game. He also finds it easier to be inspired if he has a visual representation. Mitsuda claims that he does not save his best work for more popular games, as he tries to compose each piece to correspond to how it is going to be used in a specific game. He also tries to compose good pieces even for games he feels do not live up to them, so that they will be a redeeming point about the game for the players. The majority of his video game soundtracks are for role-playing games, but he likes projects that are different from what he has done before and is interested in working in other genres.

I think [game music] is something that should last with the player. It's interesting because it can't just be some random music, but something that can make its way into the player's heart. In that sense, this not only applies to game music, but I feel very strongly about composing songs that will leave a lasting impression...What I must not forget is that it must be entertaining to those who are listening. I don't think there's much else to it, to be honest. I don't do anything too audacious, so as long as the listeners like it, or feel that it's a really great song, then I've done my job.

— Yasunori Mitsuda, 2008

== Legacy ==
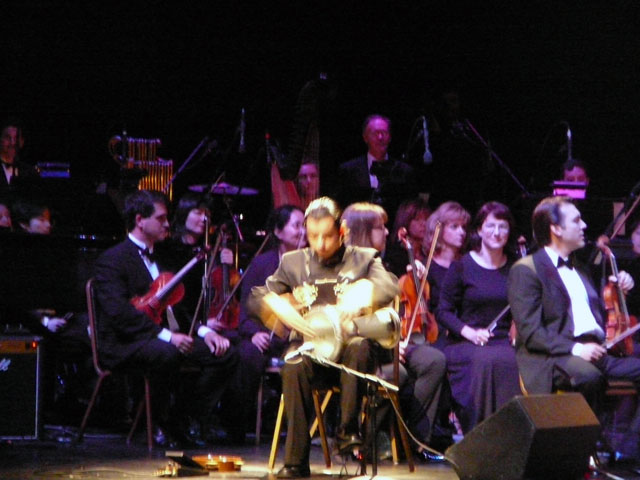
Rony Barrak performing Mitsuda's music at a Play! A Video Game Symphony concert in 2006

Mitsuda's music from Chrono Trigger was first performed live by the Tokyo Symphony Orchestra in 1996 at the Orchestral Game Concert in Tokyo, Japan, and released on an accompanying album. The first symphonic performance of his music outside Japan took place in 2005 at the Symphonic Game Music Concert in Leipzig, Germany when music from Chrono Cross was presented. Mitsuda has arranged versions of music from Trigger and Cross for Play! A Video Game Symphony video game music concerts in 2006. Music from the two games has also been performed in other video game concert tours such as the Video Games Live concert series and in concerts by the Eminence Orchestra. Chrono Trigger and Chrono Cross music made up one fourth of the music of the Symphonic Fantasies concerts in September 2009 at the Kölner Philharmonie which were produced by Thomas Böcker as a part of the Game Concerts series. "Scars of Time" from Chrono Cross was played at the Fantasy Comes Alive concert in Singapore on April 30, 2010.

Mitsuda's music for Xenogears has also sparked fan-made albums; an officially licensed tribute album titled Xenogears Light: An Arranged Album, was published in limited quantities by the fan group OneUp Studios in 2005. The album features 20 tracks arranged from the Xenogears score and performed with acoustic instruments, such as piano, flute, guitar and violin. Another, unofficial album of remixes titled Humans + Gears was produced as a digital album by OverClocked Remix on October 19, 2009, consisting of 33 tracks. Selections of remixes of Mitsuda's work also appear on Japanese remix albums, called Dōjin, and on English remixing websites such as OverClocked Remix.

Music from Chrono Trigger has been arranged for the piano and published as sheet music by DOREMI Music Publishing. Sheet music for Chrono Cross tracks arranged for both solo guitar and guitar duets has been released by Procyon Studio. For the 20th anniversary of Chrono Trigger, Mitsuda, along with his performing group Millennial Fair, performed songs from the game in Tokyo on July 25–26, 2015. The event, titled "The Brink of Time", included Mitsuda performing on the piano, guitar, and Irish bouzouki. During the event, Mitsuda also announced that the long requested Chrono series arrangement album, entitled To Far Away Times: Chrono Trigger & Chrono Cross Arrangement Album, would be released by Square Enix Music on October 14, 2015.

== Notable works ==
=== Video games ===
Video games
Year	Title	Role(s)	Ref.
1995	Chrono Trigger	Music with Nobuo Uematsu	
1996	Radical Dreamers	Music	
1996	Front Mission: Gun Hazard	Music with Nobuo Uematsu, Masashi Hamauzu, and Junya Nakano	
1996	Tobal No. 1	Music with several others	
1998	Xenogears	Music	
1998	Mario Party	Music	
1999	Chrono Cross	Music	
1999	Bomberman 64: The Second Attack	Music with several others	
2000	Mega Man Legends 2	Arrangements (Note: "It's OK to Cry" and "The Place Where Wishes Come True")	
2001	Tsugunai: Atonement	Music	
2001	Shadow Hearts	Music with Yoshitaka Hirota	
2001	Legaia 2: Duel Saga	Music with Hitoshi Sakimoto and Michiru Oshima	
2002	Xenosaga Episode I	Music	
2002	The Seventh Seal	Music with Chia Ai Kuo and Tsai Chih-Chan	
2004	Shadow Hearts: Covenant	Music with Yoshitaka Hirota, Kenji Ito, and Tomoko Kobayashi	
2004	Graffiti Kingdom	Music	
2005	10,000 Bullets	Music with Miki Higashino	
2005	Tantei Kibukawa Ryosuke Jiken-Tan	Music with Takanari Ishiyama and Kazumi Mitome	
2006	Monster Kingdom: Jewel Summoner	Music with several others	
2006	Deep Labyrinth	Music	
2007	Luminous Arc	Music with Kazumi Mitome, Akari Kaida, and Shota Kageyama	
2007	Kikou Souhei Armodyne	Music	
2008	Super Smash Bros. Brawl	Arrangements (Note: "Vs. Marx" and "World Map (Pikmin 2)")	
2008	Soma Bringer	Music	
2008	Inazuma Eleven	Music	
2008	Sands of Destruction	Music with Shunsuke Tsuchiya and Kazumi Mitome	
2009	Arc Rise Fantasia	Music with Shunsuke Tsuchiya and Yuki Harada	
2009	Lime Odyssey	Music with Dong-Hyuc Shin, Jun-Su Park, and Sa-Yin Jeong	
2009	bQLSI Star Laser	Music	
2009	Inazuma Eleven 2	Music	
2010	Xenoblade Chronicles	Ending theme "Beyond the Sky"	
2010	Inazuma Eleven 3	Music with Natsumi Kameoka	
2011	Inazuma Eleven Strikers	Music with Natsumi Kameoka	
2011	Half-Minute Hero: The Second Coming	"Battle of the 4 Deadly Sins"	
2011	Pop'n Music 20 Fantasia	"Tradria"	
2011	Inazuma Eleven Strikers 2012 Xtreme	Music with Natsumi Kameoka	
2011	Tokyo Yamanote Boys	Opening theme "Overture"	
2012	Kid Icarus: Uprising	"Opening", "Boss Battle 1"	
2012	Black Wolves Saga: Bloody Nightmare	Main theme "Dear Despair"	
2012	Inazuma Eleven GO 2: Chrono Stone	Music with Natsumi Kameoka	
2012	Inazuma Eleven GO Strikers 2013	Music with Natsumi Kameoka	
2013	Soul Sacrifice	Music with Wataru Hokoyama	
2013	Soukyuu no Sky Galleon	Main theme	
2013	DoDoDo! Dragon	Music with Shunsuke Tsuchiya and Maki Kirioka	
2013	Ken ga Kimi	Ending theme "Forever, and One"	
2013	Inazuma Eleven GO: Galaxy	Music	
2013	Hundred Years' War: Euro Historia	Arrangements with Shunsuke Tsuchiya, Maki Kirioka and Natsumi Kameoka	
2014	Soul Sacrifice Delta	Music with Wataru Hokoyama	
2014	Terra Battle	"Beyond the Light"	
2014	Ten to Daichi Megami no Mahou	Main theme	
2014	Super Smash Bros. for Nintendo 3DS and Wii U	Arrangements (Note: "Forest/Nature Area" and "Mii Channel")	
2015	Chunithm: Seelisch Tact	"Alma"	
2015	Stella Glow	Music with Shunsuke Tsuchiya	
2016	Seventh Rebirth	Music	
2017	Valkyria Revolution	Music	
2017	Another Eden	Music with Shunsuke Tsuchiya and Mariam Abounnasr	
2017	Xenoblade Chronicles 2	Music with ACE, Kenji Hiramatsu, and Manami Kiyota	
2017	Final Fantasy XV: Episode Ignis	Music with Tadayoshi Makino and Yoko Shimomura	
2017	Winning Hand	Music with Shunsuke Tsuchiya and Mariam Abounnasr	
2018	Xenoblade Chronicles 2: Torna – The Golden Country	Music with ACE, Kenji Hiramatsu, and Manami Kiyota	
2018	Revolve8	Music with Shunsuke Tsuchiya and Mariam Abounnasr	
2019	Renshin Astral	Tokyo battle themes	
2021	Edge of Eternity	Music with Cedric Menendez	
2022	Sin Chronicle	"HI・KA・RI"	
2022	Xenoblade Chronicles 3	Music with ACE, Kenji Hiramatsu, Manami Kiyota, and Mariam Abounnasr	
2023	Sea of Stars	Music with Eric W. Brown	
2024	Soul Covenant	Music	
2026	Edge of Memories	Ending theme	
2026	Another Eden Begins	Main theme	
2027	Chronoscript: The Endless End	Music with Shunsuke Tsuchiya, Mariam Abounnasr, and Manami Kiyota	
2027	Xenoblade Genesis	Music with Manami Kiyota and Mariam Abounnasr	

=== Anime ===
Anime and film
Year	Title	Role(s)	Ref.
2004	Pugyuru	Music	
2008	Inazuma Eleven	Music	
2010	Inazuma Eleven: Saikyō Gundan Ōga Shūrai	Music	
2012	Inazuma Eleven GO: Chrono Stone	Music with Shiho Terada and Natsumi Kameoka	
2012	Chōyaku Hyakunin isshu: Uta Koi	Music with Maki Kirioka	
2012	Inazuma Eleven GO vs. Danbōru Senki W	Music with Natsumi Kameoka and Rei Kondoh	
2013	Inazuma Eleven GO: Galaxy	Music with Natsumi Kameoka	
2014	Inazuma Eleven: Chou Jigen Dream Match	Music	
2014	Black Butler: Book of Circus	Music	
2014	Black Butler: Book of Murder	Music	
2017	Black Butler: Book of the Atlantic	Music	
2017	Yo-kai Watch Shadowside: Oni-ō no Fukkatsu	Recording director; orchestrations with Mariam Abounnasr	
2018	Inazuma Eleven: Ares	Music	
2018	Inazuma Eleven: Orion no Kokuin	Music	
2018	Yo-kai Watch: Forever Friends	Recording director; orchestrations with Mariam Abounnasr	
2021	Irina: The Vampire Cosmonaut	Music	
2024	Delicious in Dungeon	Music with Shunsuke Tsuchiya	
2024	Inazuma Eleven Movie: The Legendary Kickoff	Music	

=== Other projects ===
Other projects
Year	Title	Role(s)	Ref.
1995	Chrono Trigger Arranged Version: The Brink of Time	Producer	
1998	Creid	Arrangements from Xenogears	
2005	Kirite	Solo album	
2005	Specter	Film; music with Kazumi Mitome	
2009	Colours of Light	Solo album	
2011	Myth: The Xenogears Orchestral Album	Producer, arrangements	
2011	Play for Japan: The Album	"Dimension Break"	
