= Eri Kawai =

Eri Kawai 河井 英里
- Born: May 8, 1965; Tokyo, Japan
- Died: August 4, 2008 (aged 43)
- Occupation: Singer

Eri Kawai (河井 英里, Kawai Eri; May 8, 1965 – August 4, 2008) was a Japanese singer from Tokyo, Japan. She graduated from the Tokyo National University of Fine Arts and Music and both composed and sang not only classic but also pop and world music. She was also friends with well-known video game composer Yasunori Mitsuda and had collaborated with him on some of his works. She died on August 4, 2008, at age 43 after being hospitalized as the result of liver cancer.

== Discography ==
- Wāzu Wāsu no Bōken, Released May 17, 1996
- Ao ni Sasageru, Released in 1997
- Prayer, Released April 25, 2001
- Animage, Released November 22, 2001
- Animage 2, Released March 2, 2002
- Kirite, Released May 18, 2005
- Madoromi no Rinne, Released June 7, 2006
- Soma Bringer, Released February 28, 2008
- Kaze no Michi e, Released December 17, 2008
- Himawari, Released December 24, 2008
- Oriental Green, Released August 26, 2009

And she also sang the song "Almateria" from the anime and game Tales of Symphonia as well as tracks for Aria (see List of Aria soundtracks)
