= Kirite =

Studio album by Yasunori Mitsuda
- Released: May 18, 2005
- Length: 49:45
- Language: Japanese
- Label: Sleigh Bells
- Producer: Yasunori Mitsuda

Yasunori Mitsuda chronology
| Moonlit Shadow (2005) | Kirite (2005) | Near Death Experience: Shadow Hearts Arrange Tracks (2005) |

Kirite (Note: Stylized as kiЯitɘ) is a 2005 album composed by Yasunori Mitsuda based on The Five Seasons of Kirite, a story by Masato Kato. Unlike their other previous major collaborations like Chrono Trigger, Xenogears and Chrono Cross, Kirite was never developed and published as a video game, but published as musical album bundled with Masato Kato's story text in Japanese and a collection of artistic nature photographs. The music of Kirite incorporates Celtic music, jazz and ambient noise influences.

== Story ==
"The Five Seasons of Kirite" by Masato Kato set inside a world of magic and fantasy, tells the story of a boy by the name Kirite, a girl by the name Kotonoha and a darkness by the name Orochi. When those three would meet, the world would silently start to go mad.

== Creation ==
Yasunori Mitsuda and Masato Kato devised the concept of Kirite in 2003.

== Track listing ==
| No. | Title | Lyrics | Length |
|---|---|---|---|
| 1. | "Is Kirite Burning?" | | 4:25 |
| 2. | "The Market in Volfinor" | | 4:28 |
| 3. | "Promise with Winds - Petal's Whereabouts" | Junko Kudo | 4:51 |
| 4. | "The Forest of Lapis Lazuli" | | 3:19 |
| 5. | "The Azure" | Junko Kudo | 5:27 |
| 6. | "Scorning Blade" | | 3:53 |
| 7. | "Upon the Melodies of the Moon" | Eri Kawai | 2:02 |
| 8. | "The Fall of Darkness" | | 2:58 |
| 9. | "Nocturne" | | 2:33 |
| 10. | "As Autumn Passes Away" | | 3:40 |
| 11. | "The Snow Howling" | | 3:29 |
| 12. | "Prayer Tree" | | 2:10 |
| 13. | "The Name of Our Hope" | Junko Kudo | 4:53 |
| 14. | "Circle of Eternity" | | 1:32 |

== Personnel ==
- Yasunori Mitsuda – composer, sound programming, piano
- Masato Kato – story
- Junko Kudo – lyrics
- Eri Kawai – vocals, lyrics, piano
- Haruo Kondo – "early instruments"
- Akihisa Tsuboy – violin
- Tomohiko Kira – guitar, bouzouki
- Hitoshi Watanabe – bass guitar
- Kinya Sogawa – shinobue, shakuhachi
- Laurie Sogawa – tin whistle
- Hidenobu Ootsuki, Yutaka Odawara – drum kit
- Tamao Fujii – percussion
- Masumi Takahashi – photos
