= Soma Bringer =

2008 video game

- Developer: Monolith Soft
- Publisher: Nintendo
- Director: Shingo Kawabata
- Producer: Tetsuya Takahashi
- Designer: Tetsuya Takahashi
- Artists: Tonny Waiman Koo; Tadahiro Usuda
- Writer: Soraya Saga
- Composer: Yasunori Mitsuda
- Platform: Nintendo DS
- Release: JP: February 28, 2008
- Genre: Action role-playing
- Modes: Single-player, multiplayer

Soma Bringer (Note: Japanese: ソーマブリンガー, Hepburn: Sōma Buringā) is a 2008 action role-playing game developed by Monolith Soft and published by Nintendo for the Nintendo DS. The player, controlling one of the eight main characters, explores dungeons and fights enemies in real-time combat across three-dimensional plains from a top-down perspective. Multiplayer functions allow up to three players to participate in exploration and combat. The story takes place on the continent of Barnea, where its principle magical energy, Soma, is disrupted by the arrival of monsters called Visitors. This prompts a military group called Pharzuph Division 7 to defeat the Visitors and restore the balance of Soma.

Soma Bringer was the creation of producer and studio co-founder Tetsuya Takahashi. Initially a standard role-playing game before transitioning to action role-playing due to hardware restrictions, the aim was to create an engaging multiplayer experience: this resulted in the gameplay being developed before the story, a reversal of the development style used for earlier Monolith Soft titles. It featured returning staff from Takahashi's earlier titles, including Xeno series writer Soraya Saga and Chrono series composer Yasunori Mitsuda. Development took approximately two years.

First announced in October 2007, Soma Bringer was the first portable title to be fully developed by Monolith Soft and the first game they released since their acquisition by Nintendo. The game was released exclusively in Japan in February 2008. Upon its release, it was critically acclaimed by both Japanese and Western journalists and sold strongly in Japan. Western journalists drew positive comparisons with the Mana and Diablo series.

== Gameplay ==
A battle in Soma Bringer, featuring three of the eight available player characters. Battles take place in real-time in 3D environments from a top-down perspective.

Soma Bringer is an action role-playing game where players control members of a military unit dubbed Pharzuph Division 7 and explore three-dimensional environments from a top-down perspective, while the overhead camera can be zoomed in and out. Seven characters are available at the start of the game, with an eighth being unlocked later on. The game uses two modes of play. In single-player, the player controls the party leader while two assigned companions are controlled using the game's artificial intelligence. In addition to the single-player mode, the game features cooperative (co-op) multiplayer, which is activated through wireless connection and allows up to three players to freely explore environments and dungeons.

Battles take place in real-time within overworld environments and dungeons. Using a style similar to hack and slash, the three characters attack targeted enemies in the field. Abilities, including standard attacks and special moves related to a character, are mapped to the Nintendo DS's face buttons. Attacks can be chained together into combinations for higher damage. Continually attacking an enemy will cause a "Break", a period where the enemy is stunned and attacks cause more damage. Gameplay is not paused when the item menu is opened, which allows items such as regenerative potions to be used. Character health is automatically replenished when moving into a new area, and can also be restored using items.

There are six different specialized combat roles equivalent to standard character classes, which determines what weapons and skills they can equip. They are Battlers (warriors), Dark (dark knights), Gunners, Kanbus (ninja), Koas (paladins), and Somas (mages). Each class uses a different fighting style: the Kanbus focuses on dual weapons and one-hit attacks, the Koas focuses on a combination of attack and healing abilities, the Dark sacrifices health to deal more damage, Gunners specialize in long-range attacks, Battlers focus on melee attacks, and Somas use long-range magic over close-range physical attacks. Weapons are equipped based on a character's class, and can be upgraded using special items called Orbs. Weapons and items collected through exploration and from enemy drops can be sold to other players through wireless connection.

Through combat and quest completion, characters gain experience points, which raise their level. When the main character is killed in battle, the party respawns at the nearest town, and a headstone appears where they fell, containing some of the experience points gained during battles up to that point. Although experience points are lost with each death, the character does not lose experience levels. Other playable characters gain experience levels quicker depending on the player character's own level. Upon each level up, a character is granted three statistic points, which can be distributed by the player to increase a character attribute: these include maximum health. Ability points are also given, which are allocated to skills related to weapons and abilities such as spells and passive buffs and debuffs. These skills are maxed out at Level 20.

== Synopsis ==
Soma Bringer is set on the continent of Barnea, which is part of a world where the energy of everyday life is drawn from Soma, a mystical power that fills the atmosphere and forms the so-called "Soma Ring" around the planet. Through a special conversion process, it is used for everything from ordinary appliances to advanced weaponry. At some point prior to the game's opening, mysterious monsters called Visitors began appearing, which took the form of corrupted animal and plant life and began attacking human settlements. To combat the Visitors, the controlling organization in charge of regulating Soma usage - Secundady - created a dedicated military force called the Pharzuph. The main narrative follows new and veteran members of Pharzuph Division 7, who set out to investigate and combat a recent spate of Visitor attacks. During the mission, the group encounter Idea, an amnesiac girl with latent and highly attuned Soma-related abilities who is assigned to Pharzuph Division 7 by their leader Master Laban. During their continued missions against Visitors, Pharzuph Division 7 are confronted by the Unbras, a group with similar powers to Idea and whose leader Adonis seeks Master Cages, Soma-condensing devices connected to the origins of Soma technology.

As the group travels, they discover that Adonis and the Master Cages are linked to the origin of Soma, the energy of life which the extraterrestrial Arethia granted humans the ability to use. Arethia existed in legend as a false god banished through the use of Soma, but was actually a non-physical collective consciousness that traded use of human bodies for technical knowledge that allowed humans to thrive. The Arethia were betrayed by humanity and robbed of the ability to use physical hosts after a vicious war. The Arethia consciousness was imprisoned beyond the atmosphere in the Soma Ring, which is an orbital ring controlled from the Ring Tower in the ancient human citadel of Cremona; imprisoning the Arethia allowed humanity to freely use and control Soma energy. However, a weakness eventually appeared in the Ring's containment field and some of the Arethia consciousness escaped. After being corrupted by the journey to the surface, the formerly benign energy mutated and infected other lifeforms with a mindless wish for self-preservation, becoming the Visitors.

Both Idea and Adonis were created using Master Cages as weapons during the conflict, though they were awakened in the present. Only Adonis fully awoke, while Idea suffered an incomplete awakening after being found by Pharzuph Division 7 and regressed to a childlike amnesiac state. In addition, Master Laban has been using Pharzuph Division 7 to gain access to the Master Cages to stop Adonis and continue the use of Soma energy by destroying the Arethia consciousness. Welt, a new member of Pharzuph Division 7, is contacted by Orpheus, the avatar of the Arethia's true will. Through Welt, it asks Pharzuph Division 7 to stop both Laban and Adonis, the latter wishing to bring destruction upon mankind for its treatment of the Arethia. After traveling to the Soma Ring via the Ring Tower, Pharzuph Division 7 confronts Adonis and defeats the incarnation of the corrupt Arethia energies. With Welt's help, Adonis, Idea, and Orpheus stabilize the Soma flow and pacify the Visitors. Welt reunites with his comrades, but Orpheus, Adonis, and Idea leave to merge with the Arethia along with the Visitor energies.

== Development ==
Soma Bringer was the brainchild of Tetsuya Takahashi, one of the co-founders of developer Monolith Soft. It was the first time Monolith Soft had full development responsibilities for a game on a portable platform. The game took approximately two years to develop: Takahashi's aim was to create an in-depth introductory role-playing experience for the DS. The DS was chosen as the game's platform so people could both enjoy the game and play it for short bursts on the go. The story was written by Takahashi's wife Soraya Saga, whose previous work included Final Fantasy VI (1994), Xenogears (1998), and the Xenosaga series. Due to the goal of creating a fun co-op gameplay experience, Saga deliberately kept the story "simple and clear not to interrupt the fun of playing". The narrative was based around the titular energy "Soma", which was a key part of everyday life, with the Soma Ring encircling the planet forming a key part of the story. Also among the staff were director Shingo Kawabata, art director Tonny Waiman Koo, and character designer Tadahiro Usuda. Takahashi acted as game designer.

At the beginning of development, Soma Bringer was to be a standard role-playing game. During early testing, it was seen that typical role-playing games were not well suited to the DS' limited hardware and controls, so they adjusted the gameplay to its current form as an action role-playing game. After positive feedback from this, the team went ahead. The move to being an action role-playing game enabled the incorporation of cooperative multiplayer: the team wanted to focus as much as possible on the combat and related gimmicks over environmental puzzles. Rather than a separate mode, multiplayer was incorporated into the main story. The development cycle differed greatly from previous Monolith Soft titles. In Takahashi's earlier games, the scenario was written first then the gameplay was tailored to fit. For Soma Bringer, the gameplay was finalized first, and the scenario was built around the locations, dungeons, and mechanics the team had created. Also in contrast to earlier Monolith Soft titles was the lack of lengthy cutscenes, which could not be incorporated into the game with the DS' limited hardware. Instead, the team used the real-time graphics and gameplay models for equivalent scenes.

=== Music ===
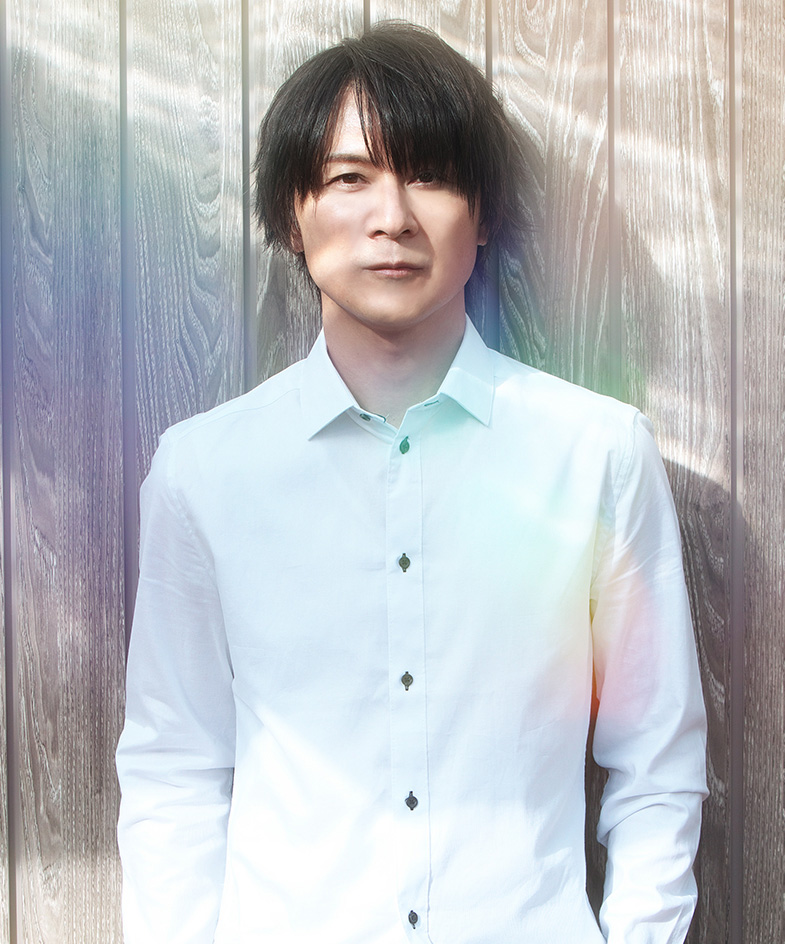
Yasunori Mitsuda composed and produced the original score for Soma Bringer

The music for Soma Bringer was composed and arranged by Yasunori Mitsuda, whose previous notable work included titles such as Chrono Trigger, Xenogears, Chrono Cross, and Xenosaga Episode I. Mitsuda was involved from the very beginning of development, as Takahashi did not want to work on a game without Mitsuda's music. Mitsuda accepted due to their past work on Xenogears and Xenosaga, considering it a kind of reunion. Mitsuda's music formed a key part in compensating for the lack of proper cutscenes, as the music made up for any lack in dramatic character movement during story sequences.

Due to the gameplay being created first, Mitsuda had difficulty pinning down what he had to do, and wrote songs for the soundtrack based on the gradually-emerging visuals and scenario. Mitsuda estimated that he had written around one hundred songs for the game including test tracks. The opening vocal track, titled "Ring", was written for the opening movie and set to a piece of poetry written by Takahashi: to portray the themes of the game, Mitsuda used three female vocalists, Eri Kawai, Koko Komine, and Tamie Hirose, and recorded in a multiplexer to produce as clear a sound as possible. Kawai also performed vocal work for the track "Destruction". For each of the location themes, Mitsuda used a different primary instrument to create an impression: for instance, for a desert location, he used a sitar, while a location dominated by machinery used electric guitar. All the instrument sounds were created using a synthesizer.

Mitsuda and his team spent the first year of the game's development studying the DS hardware, which had notoriously bad sound quality and brought with it severe technical difficulties in creating a soundtrack of a similar caliber to Mitsuda's previous work: the main limitations were the speaker limits and limited memory capacity. Part of the difficulty in composing the music was creating different mixes for the soundtrack depending on whether the player selected the built-in speakers or the headphones. According to Mitsuda, the speakers and the headphones had very different hertz outputs, meaning it was impossible to maintain the same quality for both settings. The end result was described by Mitsuda as "a much better sound quality with a lesser amount of data". Two key people cited by Mitsuda in overcoming these barriers were sound programmer Hidenori Suzuki and synthesizer operator Junya Kuroda. Kuroda came up with multiple techniques for improving the sound quality, a task which had been so infuriating for Mitsuda that he came close to giving up multiple times. According to Kuroda, the main difficulty was not a lack of techniques for creating a clean sound for the DS, but applying them to the music of Soma Bringer, which was more ambitious than many other soundtracks for the platform. The result of using their own technology meant that, after adjustment and balancing, the tracks were very close to the original tracks prior to being incorporated into the game and DS sound environment. Suzuki worked on the dedicated sound driver, and Mitsuda appraised him with achieving a clean sound for the opening track.

A soundtrack album, Soma Bringer Original Soundtrack, was released through the Sleigh Bells label on April 2, 2008. The soundtrack covers three discs. In addition to tracks used in-game, the album includes four tracks with full orchestral versions of particular tracks. Ben Schweitzer, writing for RPGFan, positively compared the score to earlier works by Mitsuda, calling it his best recent soundtrack despite some tracks being overly similar to earlier work. Don Kotowski of Video Game Music Online gave the soundtrack album a perfect score of 5/5 stars. He frequently praised Mitsuda's style, and like Schweitzer noted that it often recalled his earlier work. He also praised the additional tracks for their richness and depth, finishing his review by saying that it was a soundtrack not to be missed by buyers of video game music.

=== Release ===
The existence of Soma Bringer was first hinted at when Nintendo filed a trademark for the title alongside others. It was officially announced in October that year at a Nintendo press conference. Published by Nintendo, Soma Bringer was the first Monolith Soft title to be released after its acquisition by Nintendo in April 2007. It was released on February 28, 2008. After positive impressions from previews during public gaming events in Japan, both IGN and 1UP.com voiced a hope that the game would receive a localization. Speaking in 2010, Saga said that she did not know whether it would be released outside Japan, or whether further games set in the Soma Bringer universe would be developed.

Ultimately, Soma Bringer was not released outside Japan: no explanation was given by Nintendo, although there was some speculation that its high text content was to blame. Its exclusivity to Japan has drawn both disappointment and criticism from some journalists, in addition to continued hope for a Western release: an article from IGN cited the release of Glory of Heracles as a possible precursor to a Western release, while gaming site Siliconera reported that Nintendo might release it in the West during the transitional phase between the DS and its successor the Nintendo 3DS, although the writer noted that Soma Bringer's text-heavy approach made it more difficult and thus less appealing to localize. To date, it remains exclusive to Japan. An unofficial open fan translation patch was created: while not complete, it translated the greater majority of text into English.

== Reception ==
Reception

Review scores
Publication	Score
Famitsu	32/40
GamesRadar+	3.5/5
RPGamer	4/5

Soma Bringer entered the Japanese sales charts at #4 with sales of 50,844 units, with an estimated sell-through rate of just over 68%. The limited edition was the best-selling DS title during its opening week on Amazon Japan. By the following week, the game had dropped to #7 with further sales of 17,000 units. By the end of 2008, the game had sold 107,127 units.

Famitsu gave the game a positive review: while one reviewer noted that the story and gameplay offered little originality, all reviewers positively noted the amount of depth and customization next to the ease of play. GamesRadar compared Soma Bringer to Square Enix's Final Fantasy: Crystal Chronicles, except noting that the gameplay systems and customization options were deeper. The reviewer called it "pretty good", but noted that it was not import friendly due to the large amount of text. Mike Moehnke of RPGamer was generally positive about the game, praising the character customization, general gameplay, ease of entry, and Mitsuda's music. Like the GamesRadar reviewer, Moehnke noted the heavy amount of text making understanding Japanese a necessity for understanding the story, despite calling it a "fairly easy import" as the story was not the game's main focus.

Siliconera writer Rolando again echoed the necessity for understanding Japanese due to the game's text-heavy nature while noting the plot was quite simple and in common with other Monolith Soft titles, but otherwise generally praised the gameplay mechanics and noted that multiplayer would be fun despite the lack of WiFi functionality. In conclusion, he positively compared Soma Bringer to console turn-based role-playing game Lost Odyssey: while it brought nothing new to the genre, it was a nostalgic experience that reminded players of the genre's worth. English reviews positively compared the gameplay to the Mana series, with 1UP.com's Jeremy Parish also noting it feeling familiar to gameplay from the Diablo series. These comparisons were also shared by other reviewers.
