= List of Delicious in Dungeon episodes =

Key visual for the series

Delicious in Dungeon is an anime television series based on the manga series of the same name by Ryoko Kui. Originally announced in 2022, the series is produced by Trigger. It is directed by Yoshihiro Miyajima, with scripts written by Kimiko Ueno, character designs by Naoki Takeda, and music composed by Yasunori Mitsuda and Shunsuke Tsuchiya. The first opening theme song is "Sleep Walking Orchestra", performed by Bump of Chicken, while the first ending theme song is "Party!!", performed by Ryokuoushoku Shakai. The second opening theme song is "Unmei" (運命; "Destiny"), performed by Sumika, while the second ending theme song is "Kirakira no Hai" (キラキラの灰; "Twinkling Ash"), performed by Regal Lily. The series aired its first season in two consecutive cours from January 4 to June 13, 2024, on Tokyo MX and other networks, with Netflix licensing it for streaming and simuldubbing worldwide weekly.

After the final episode of the first season, a second season was announced. It is set to premiere worldwide on Netflix in October 2027.

== Series overview ==
Season	Episodes	Originally released	
Season	Episodes	First released	Last released
1	24	January 4, 2024	June 13, 2024
2	TBA	October 2027	TBA

== Episodes ==
=== Season 1 (2024) ===
No.	Title (Note: All English titles are taken from Netflix.)	Directed by	Written by	Storyboarded by	Original release date
1	"Hot Pot"; Transliteration: "Mizutaki" (Japanese: 水炊き)	Hideyuki Satake	Kimiko Ueno	Yoshihiro Miyajima	January 4, 2024
1	"Tart"; Transliteration: "Taruto" (Japanese: タルト)	Hideyuki Satake	Kimiko Ueno	Naoki Takeda	January 4, 2024
After encountering a legendary red dragon in a dungeon, the adventurer Laios Touden and his party are almost killed until his sister Falin is swallowed by the dragon. Her last act is to teleport everyone safely out of the dungeon. Laios hopes to retrieve Falin so she can be resurrected, but this must happen before she is fully digested, or she will be dead permanently. Unfortunately, two party members quit, leaving only Elven mage Marcille Donato, Halfling thief Chilchuck Tims, and no money. Since they need their equipment to survive and cannot sell it to buy food, Laios makes the radical suggestion to hunt and eat dungeon monsters. After spending some time convincing Marcille, they agree to try it. Their initial attempt to cook a monster scorpion is disgusting but does draw the attention of Dwarf warrior Senshi, a veteran of monster cookery. With his assistance, they produce a scorpion and mushroom hot-pot even the reluctant Marcille finds delicious. Learning they seek the red dragon, Senshi joins their party. Moving deeper into the dungeon, they camp for the night while Senshi makes supper; a tart made from the fruits of giant carnivorous plant monsters.
2	"Roast Basilisk"; Transliteration: "Rōsuto Bajirisuku" (Japanese: ローストバジリスク)	Takumi Ichikawa	Nanami Higuchi	Takumi Ichikawa	January 11, 2024
2	"Omelet"; Transliteration: "Omuretsu" (Japanese: オムレツ)	Takumi Ichikawa	Nanami Higuchi	Takumi Ichikawa	January 11, 2024
2	"Kakiage" (Japanese: かき揚げ)	Takumi Ichikawa	Nanami Higuchi	Takumi Ichikawa	January 11, 2024
Senshi lectures the group on the typical poor diet of adventurers, which is high in fat and low on vegetables. As Marcille is craving meat, Senshi recommends hunting a basilisk and its eggs. During the hunt, another adventurer is poisoned, but Senshi shows them cooking then eating the basilisk acts as an antidote. Requiring vegetables, Senshi harvests screaming mandrakes using a shortcut method. Marcille tries to demonstrate the proper method of harvesting mandrakes, but messes up and is attacked by a bat monster. Laios helps her feel better by pointing out things she is good at. Senshi discovers harvesting mandrakes the right way makes them taste sweeter, so he credits Marcille for teaching him something new and cooks mandrake and basilisk egg omelettes. Moving to the next floor, Chilchuck takes the lead as the area is full of booby traps. Unfortunately, Senshi delights in setting off traps on purpose and repurposes a fire trap and a hot oil trap into an oil fryer to make mandrake and bat meat kakiage. During the process, the two gain a better appreciation of each other as Chilchuck shows Senshi how to manipulate traps in exchange for basic cookery skills.
3	"Living Armor"; Transliteration: "Ugoku Yoroi" (Japanese: 動く鎧)	Kōdai Nakano	Yū Satō	Ichigo Kanno	January 18, 2024
When Laios' sword is damaged, he recalls how he first found it. Three years ago, he and Falin were novices and Laios was killed for the first time by a living armor monster but managed to keep the armor's sword once he was resurrected. By chance, the party is now in the same area where suits of armor congregate and end up surrounded by them. Marcille suspects the suits of armor are not monsters themselves, but empty puppets magically controlled by another monster. Laios confronts a larger suit of armor guarding an egg case and his damaged sword is destroyed. He realizes the armor pieces are actually the shells of dozens of small, mollusc-like monsters. Using the egg as bait, Laios defeats the larger suit of armor then distracts the smaller suit of armor and they safely escape. Deciding to treat them like giant shellfish, Senshi removes all the monsters from the large suit of armor and cooks them in several ways. While edible, the results vary by cooking method. Laios takes the large suit of armor's much stronger sword as a replacement but makes the odd decision to hide from the others that one monster is still alive in the sword's handle.
4	"Stewed Cabbage"; Transliteration: "Kyabetsu Ni" (Japanese: キャベツ煮)	Yūki Kono	Kimiko Ueno	Tatsumi Fujii	January 25, 2024
4	"Orcs"; Transliteration: "Ōku" (Japanese: オーク)	Yūki Kono	Kimiko Ueno	Tatsumi Fujii	January 25, 2024
Senshi reveals the third floor is populated only by undead and golems. Fortunately, golems are made of mud perfect for growing vegetables, so he keeps three at his secret campsite. After enjoying stewed cabbage, Marcille is disgusted that Senshi uses toilet waste as fertilizer. Senshi reveals that his golems help prevent more dangerous monsters from rising to the surface. By keeping the remaining three golems healthy, he keeps adventurers on upper floors safe. They take the extra vegetables to a merchant, but the shop is attacked by orcs led by Chief Zon. It transpires Senshi intended to trade with the orcs all along as they are friends. The orcs are struggling as the red dragon has been invading their territory. Senshi gives them the vegetables and also shows them how to make bread. Marcille and Zon argue due to their species' past conflicts, but when Zon's infant son interrupts, they manage to share a meal. Laios shares the party's reason for hunting the dragon and his goal of conquering the dungeon. As such, Zon reveals the dragon was last seen two floors down on the fifth floor.
5	"Snacks"; Transliteration: "Oyatsu" (Japanese: おやつ)	Aika Ikeda	Nanami Higuchi	Aika Ikeda	February 1, 2024
5	"Sorbet"; Transliteration: "Sorube" (Japanese: ソルベ)	Aika Ikeda	Nanami Higuchi	Aika Ikeda	February 1, 2024
An adventuring party led by Kabru are also attempting to conquer the dungeon. After slaying an undead, they find treasure in its pockets. Later, Laios and the others find Kabru and his party mysteriously dead and the monster in Laios' sword goes berserk. It turns out the treasure Kabru found are actually venomous insects called Treasure Bugs. After defeating them, Laios continues to conceal the monster's presence. To Marcille's horror, Senshi reveals some of the bugs are edible and can be made into fried snacks. After Chilchuck throws the inedible treasure into an abyss, Senshi reveals they are inedible due to it being real treasure. Laios suspects the monster tried to protect him, so he names it Kensuke. They are then attacked by ghosts using ice magic, causing everyone to remember Falin used to treat ghosts kindly as she could communicate with them. Senshi drives them away with his version of holy water; a mix of alcohol, sugar, slime organs, herbs, and sweet Treasure Bugs boiled over blessed candles. The ghosts eventually disperse but Senshi discovers their coldness froze the holy water into an ice cream he dubs Exorcist Sorbet. Laios wishes Falin were there with them.
6	"Court Cuisine"; Transliteration: "Kyūteiryōri" (Japanese: 宮廷料理)	Keita Nagahara	Yū Satō	Keita Nagahara	February 8, 2024
6	"Boiled in Salt Water"; Transliteration: "Shioyude" (Japanese: 塩茹で)	Keita Nagahara	Yū Satō	Keita Nagahara	February 8, 2024
The party discover a disused dining hall where paintings turn out to be Living Picture monsters. Laios decides to see if being absorbed by the paintings makes the food inside them edible. As he passes from painting to painting, he witnesses scenes from the life of Prince Delgal. In each painting, Laios encounters an elf who remembers and ultimately tries to kill him, believing he is there to assassinate Delgal. Proving the food is not real, the party remains hungry and sets up camp. Chilchuck spots a Mimic but says nothing as he despises Mimics for always disguising themselves as treasure chests. However, while everyone asleep that night, he accidentally lets a Treasure Bug lure him into the Mimic's room and becomes trapped. Figuring out how to open the door, he escapes the Mimic, which is crushed when the door closed on it. With everyone now awake, Senshi, seeing the Mimic's resemblance to a giant crab, boils it in saltwater. Chilchuck eats it reluctantly as his experience has only made him hate them more. Chilchuck also admits that he is 28, turning 29 soon, making Laios the youngest party member.
7	"Kelpie"; Transliteration: "Kerupī" (Japanese: 水棲馬)	Kōdai Nakano	Yū Satō	Yoshihiro Miyajima	February 15, 2024
7	"Porridge"; Transliteration: "Zōsui" (Japanese: 雑炊)	Kōdai Nakano	Yū Satō	Yoshihiro Miyajima	February 15, 2024
7	"Broiled with Sauce"; Transliteration: "Kabayaki" (Japanese: 蒲焼き)	Kōdai Nakano	Yū Satō	Yoshihiro Miyajima	February 15, 2024
Kabru and his party are resurrected and tricked into believing they were killed by Laios' party. Meanwhile on the fourth floor, Laios' party must cross a lake using magic, only for Senshi to refuse, revealing he has so much monster blood and oil in his beard that magic does not work on him. When he summons his pet kelpie, Anne, she cunningly tries to drown him. With Laios' help, Senshi kills her. Laios and Chilchuck later find Kabru's party has died again, this time drowned by mermaids. Chilchuck rejects Laios' suggestion they eat the latter. Laios makes porridge from grain Kabru dropped, Mimic and lake weeds. Chilchuck is furious when Laios secretly adds mermaid eggs. Marcille makes soap from kelpie fat, which Senshi uses to bathe for the first time in years, allowing them all to cross the lake. They are then attacked by a kraken, which Senshi kills with a mermaid's trident. Due to the kraken's bitterness, they instead eat the giant parasitic worms infecting it. When Laios foolishly tries to eat it raw, he becomes infected with a smaller worm, leaving him with a stomach ache.
8	"Raspberries"; Transliteration: "Kiichigo" (Japanese: 木苺)	Yuichi Shimohira	Nanami Higuchi	Yūki Yonemori	February 22, 2024
8	"Grilled Meat"; Transliteration: "Yakiniku" (Japanese: 焼き肉)	Yuichi Shimohira	Nanami Higuchi	Yūki Yonemori	February 22, 2024
While considering the effects of adventurers on the dungeon's ecosystem, Marcille remembers her youth as an academy student when she dreamed of creating a balanced dungeon that would be safe for adventurers. By contrast, Falin was aimless and easily distracted yet achieved better results by sneaking out to experience a real dungeon. Marcille accompanied her on one trip and realized even dungeons that seemed chaotic were delicately balanced and designing one herself would be much more complex than she naively assumed. This gave her great respect for the sorcerer who created this dungeon as he supposedly did so despite being insane. Chilchuck decides they are only two days away from the dragon and plans their sleep schedule accordingly. Marcille misses other girls, causing her to angrily remember Namari and Shuro, the party members who quit after Falin died. Marcille later accidentally provokes an Undine. She eventually escapes but runs out of magic to recover from her blood loss, delaying the party's progress. To recover, Senshi feeds her ingredients high in iron, namely grilled kelpie liver, angering her when they eat all the other tastier meat without her getting to try any. Meanwhile, Namari's party smells them cooking and becomes curious.
9	"Tentacles"; Transliteration: "Tentakurusu" (Japanese: テンタクルス)	Noboru Furukawa	Kimiko Ueno	Noboru Furukawa	February 29, 2024
9	"Stew"; Transliteration: "Shichū" (Japanese: シチュー)	Noboru Furukawa	Kimiko Ueno	Noboru Furukawa	February 29, 2024
Namari's party consists of gnome researchers Mr. and Mrs. Tansu, and bodyguards Kaka and Kiki. The Tansus arrogantly assume the Undine will not attack them, resulting in Namari's death. After resurrecting her, Mr. Tansu's further impatience gets Kiki attacked by a tentacle monster. Once it is defeated, Senshi discovers tentacles pair well with vinegar. As it will take a week for the Undine to calm down, the Tansus decide to return to the surface. Laios tries to send Marcille with them but she refuses. Marcille then asks Namari to rejoin the party, but she cannot due to financial reasons. To recover her magic, Marcille decides she must eat the Undine. Senshi offers his cooking pot and lid as a shield, which Namari realizes are forged from adamant. Namari and Senshi trap and kill the Undine by boiling it, after which Marcille turns it into a kelpie and tentacle stew. Before departing, Laios asks Namari about Shuro's whereabouts. Namari reveals that since Shuro is in love with Falin, she believes that he too is trying to rescue her.
10	"Giant Frogs"; Transliteration: "Ōgaeru" (Japanese: 大ガエル)	Tomoyuki Munehiro	Yū Satō	Tomoyuki Munehiro	March 7, 2024
10	"Aboveground"; Transliteration: "Chijōnite" (Japanese: 地上にて)	Tomoyuki Munehiro	Yū Satō	Tomoyuki Munehiro	March 7, 2024
While trying to get to the fifth floor, frog monsters attack the party on a staircase infested with tentacles. Chilchuck discovers frog skin is immune to tentacle venom, allowing him to rip out a tentacle blocking a crossbow trap, killing the last frog. To bypass the tentacles, Laios makes frog suits while Senshi makes pasta from tentacles and frog meat. Reaching the Castle City, the party find the orcs' abandoned stronghold. Laios is confused why the dragon is still moving from place to place. Elsewhere, Mr. Tansu reports to the local Lord who has recently received a demand from the Elf King to return lands that once belonged to the elves, which includes the dungeon. Tansu suspects the elves want the dungeon's unique spell of immortality. As the spell is likely to be held by the insane sorcerer, the Lord decides to delay the elves and support the adventurers until they defeat the sorcerer. Back in the dungeon, Laios starts to realize how difficult killing the dragon will be due to the absence of Falin, Namari, and Shuro. The decision is instead made to lure and trap it. The dragon finally appears after Senshi makes frog meat cutlets.
11	"Red Dragon I"; Transliteration: "Reddo Doragon Ichi" (Japanese: 炎竜1)	Hideyuki Satake	Nanami Higuchi	Nobutoshi Ogura	March 14, 2024
Luring the dragon to Marcille's trap goes awry when Laios drops the cooking pot shield due to the dragon's fire breath. The party rushes to the trap and Marcille activates it, seemingly burying the dragon in rubble. When the dragon emerges unharmed, Kensuke panics and jumps out of reach, leaving Laios weaponless while Senshi's axe shatters on the dragon's scales. Luckily, Senshi's chef knife is made of mithril, which Chilchuck ultimately uses to blind the dragon's left eye. With the dragon distracted, Senshi grabs Kensuke and throws it to Laios before he and Chilchuck are buried under rubble. With Marcille's magic, Laios manages to kill the dragon. However, he loses his leg in the process. While on the ground, Laios remembers how he first discovered Falin was able to communicate with ghosts after she rescued him. He abruptly awakens after Falin confusingly tells him goodbye and not to worry about her. After Marcille heals everyone (even reattaching Laios' leg), Chilchuck demands Laios eventually explain about his sword. The party then slowly carves the dragon up to reach the organs. Unfortunately, they discover the dragon staying awake for longer than normal sped up the digestion process and all they find of Falin is her magic staff and her skeleton.
12	"Red Dragon II"; Transliteration: "Reddo Doragon Ni" (Japanese: 炎竜2)	Chiho Kiyota	Kimiko Ueno	Chiho Kiyota	March 21, 2024
Due to the complex rules of resurrection, the party is unable to take Falin's bones to the surface or fetch a necromancer. In desperation, Marcille decides to perform the spell herself using dragon flesh to regrow Falin's missing parts. This also reveals her strongest magic is Ancient Black Magic, which she rarely uses as it is considered evil. Reassembling Falin's skeleton, Marcille performs the spell and Falin is resurrected. After getting over her confusion, Falin and Marcille bathe while Laios worries about how to safely return to the surface again. Chilchuck is conflicted over knowing Marcille can use illegal magic. Senshi prepares to cook the dragon, unaware the fuel that creates its fire breath has leaked, causing a giant explosion. Everyone survives thanks to Falin, who somehow used magic without an incantation. With the dragon now on fire, Senshi makes dragon soup, pizzas and steaks. Falin easily accepts eating monsters, thrilling Laios who also finally reveals the truth about Kensuke. As no one can decide what to do with it, Laios continues to keep it for now. As the party sleeps that night, another elf finds the dragon corpse and the remains of Marcille's forbidden ancient magic spell.
13	"Red Dragon III"; Transliteration: "Reddo Doragon San" (Japanese: 炎竜3)	Kōdai Nakano	Yū Satō	Kōdai Nakano	March 28, 2024
13	"Good Medicine"; Transliteration: "Ryōyaku" (Japanese: 良薬)	Kōdai Nakano	Yū Satō	Kōdai Nakano	March 28, 2024
Falin sleepwalks back to the dragon corpse. The elf, who is the insane sorcerer who built the dungeon, is angry that Falin failed to locate Lord Delgal. Laios recognizes the sorcerer as the elf from the Living Picture Monsters. As Falin's body is made of dragon flesh, the sorcerer uses similar ancient magic as Marcille to transform her into a new form to locate Delgal. Meanwhile, the rest of the party is captured by a group of orcs led by Chief Zon's sister, Leed. While Marcille and Laios are unconscious, Chilchuck suggests lying to them so they agree to return to the surface instead of saving Falin. Leed is disgusted but agrees to take him to retrieve his belongings so he can leave alone. Chilchuck notices the dragon corpse has now disappeared entirely. Leed coaxes him to recount the story of how they killed the dragon, causing Chilchuck to realize he is afraid of having to watch his friends die. After retrieving everyone's belongings, he tries to convince Laios to return to the surface. When Senshi approves of the idea, Laios reluctantly agrees.
14	"Sea Serpent"; Transliteration: "Shīsāpento" (Japanese: シーサーペント)	Shinya Kawabe	Nanami Higuchi	Hisatoshi Shimizu	April 4, 2024
In a flashback, Mr. and Mrs. Tansu resurrected Kabru and his party. Without food, they attempted to return to the surface. However, they encountered an illusion spell that caused them to see each other as enemies. Once Kabru realized this, the culprits were revealed to be the labyrinth's corpse retrievers. After he killed them, he became unexpectedly depressed as similar scams caused less adventurers to bother entering the dungeon. Kabru gathered all the details he knew of the thieves and deduced they must be the Toudens' party. He also deduced Laios wanted to conquer the dungeon, but doubted Laios could handle owning a dungeon and its resources without harming society on the surface. The party were then attacked by a sea serpent but were saved by Shuro and his new party of women from his homeland in the East. Kabru volunteered his help to Shuro in finding Falin. Back in the present, despite two days having passed since killing the dragon, Laios and his friends remain trapped in the underground city where all the exits have mysteriously vanished, and are in danger of starving to death.
15	"Dryad"; Transliteration: "Doraiado" (Japanese: ドライアド)	Yūki Kono	Kimiko Ueno	Nobutoshi Ogura	April 11, 2024
15	"Cockatrice"; Transliteration: "Kokatorisu" (Japanese: コカトリス)	Yūki Kono	Kimiko Ueno	Nobutoshi Ogura	April 11, 2024
Marcille realizes the sorcerer is altering the dungeon's layout to keep them trapped. Noticing everyone is hungry, Senshi feels ashamed over not feeding them enough and decides to hunt the very next monster they encounter. Unfortunately, he, Laios, and Chilchuck encounter dryads whose pollen causes severe hay fever. Using voice commands, Chilchuck acts as Senshi's eyes allowing him to kill the dryads. Meanwhile, Marcille is unable to fight with her staff broken but requires magic and time to regrow it. Senshi makes dryad and mandrake soup and sautéed dryad fruits. To increase their chances of survival, Marcille begins teaching Laios healing magic. Feeling oddly fatherly toward Chilchuck, Senshi bizarrely chooses to give him "the talk". Laios performs his first healing spell but becomes affected by mana sickness, a common ailment for first timers, so the others leave him to rest. They are attacked by a cockatrice. They kill the cockatrice, but Marcille is turned to stone in an unbalanced position that makes her fragile and easy to break. Using a combination of Laios' new healing magic and medicinal herbs, they cure her but it takes four days, making her feel guilty so much time was wasted.
16	"Cleaners"; Transliteration: "Sōjiya" (Japanese: 掃除屋)	Shimon Dohi	Yū Satō	Yoshifumi Hagano	April 18, 2024
16	"Dried with Sweet Sake"; Transliteration: "Mirin Boshi" (Japanese: みりん干し)	Shimon Dohi	Yū Satō	Yoshifumi Hagano	April 18, 2024
Chilchuck notices a pattern to how the dungeon keeps changing and manages to lead them back to where they killed the dragon. Laios sees an undead that warns him of the Magician's Eye. Marcille then spots cleaners, minuscule magical animals that repair damage to the dungeon. Chilchuck locates the exit to the fourth floor, so Senshi cooks a chicken and egg dish using cockatrice, dryad, mandrake, and leftover healing herbs inside an edible stone dish made of crushed cleaners. The party abruptly encounter Shuro, Kabru, and their parties, and Kabru quickly determines Laios might not be the thief he thought he was. When Shuro collapses from exhaustion, everyone gets together to cook a larger meal. Laios tells Shuro and Kabru that Falin might have been taken to an even deeper floor by the sorcerer. Senshi notices Shuro's attendant, Maizuru, is deeply concerned for Shuro's health since she has been taking care of him since he was a child. Senshi consoles her and together they bring a meal to Shuro and Laios. They find a furious Shuro attacking Laios for using black magic to revive Falin since if this is ever revealed to the authorities, Laios' party will be executed, including Falin. Meanwhile, a mutated Falin watches them from a distance, mindlessly searching for Delgal.
17	"Harpy"; Transliteration: "Hāpī" (Japanese: ハーピー)	Noboru Furukawa	Nanami Higuchi	Yoshiyuki Kaneko	April 25, 2024
17	"Chimera"; Transliteration: "Kimera" (Japanese: キメラ)	Noboru Furukawa	Nanami Higuchi	Yoshiyuki Kaneko	April 25, 2024
Kabru helps Shuro realize Laios' only other option was to let Falin stay dead. Whilst being attacked by harpies, Falin, now a chimera, suddenly attacks as well and kills most of Shuro's and Kabru's party members. Laios hesitates to attack her, resulting in Kabru's death. Once Falin flees, Holm, Maizuru and Marcille resurrect everybody. Asebi, one of Shuro's party members, goes missing. Shuro blames Marcille and insists that after they kill Falin, Marcille will be handed to the Western Elven Kingdom for punishment. When Laios counters that they should defeat the sorcerer to save Falin instead, they have a fistfight that quickly becomes a childish squabble. Having cleared the air, Shuro decides to treat Falin as though she died, return to his own country and never come back. Laios still plans to defeat the sorcerer and Kabru starts to believe that with his level of monster knowledge and ingenuity, Laios might somehow manage to succeed. After eating a harpy egg omelette, Shuro's and Kabru's parties teleport to the surface. Before he leaves, Shuro gives Laios a magic tool to contact him with in case he needs help to escape. Alone again, Laios and his friends follow after Falin.
18	"Shapeshifter"; Transliteration: "Sheipu Shifutā" (Japanese: シェイプシフター)	Takumi Narita	Kimiko Ueno	Akira Amemiya	May 2, 2024
The party follows Falin down to the sixth floor, where there are old dwarven tunnels that should be warm but are instead frozen over by ice. Laios learns from Marcille that Delgal was king 1,000 years ago but disappeared when the labyrinth was discovered, leading to the sorcerer's obsession with finding him. The party soon encounters a shapeshifter that makes copies of everyone. After exposing the obvious fakes, only one copy each of Marcille, Chilchuck and Senshi remain, making it Laios' responsibility to identify them. Despite their lack of faith in his deductive abilities due to his general obliviousness, everyone pairs up with their copies to prepare dinner. Laios guesses which copies are real, but the rest of the party does not trust him and begins fighting their copies. Laios exposes the shapeshifter by assuming the persona of a hunting hound, scaring it enough to lose control of the copies, which disappear and confirm Laios' guesses to be correct. Marcille blows up the shapeshifter, and Laios reveals that the lack of monster awareness is what tipped him off on which Chilchuck and Senshi were fake and which Marcille was real. Marcille is suddenly taken hostage by Asebi.
19	"Hag"; Transliteration: "Yamanba" (Japanese: 山姥)	Kōdai Nakano	Yū Satō	Nobutoshi Ogura	May 9, 2024
19	"Nightmare"; Transliteration: "Muma" (Japanese: 夢魔)	Kōdai Nakano	Yū Satō	Nobutoshi Ogura	May 9, 2024
Asebi reveals she is affected by two black magic curses, which she demands Marcille remove. When Senshi gives her some cheese and mushroom risotto, she ungratefully throws away the mushrooms. Maizuru's curse summons a demon to kill Asebi. After Senshi kills it, he lectures Asebi on wasting food. The second curse turned Asebi into an artificial beast-man, which is the same curse Falin has. Laios is glad, however, as Asebi's ability to retain her sanity means that it may be possible to restore Falin's mind. Asebi soon abandons her beast-man name and returns to her human name, Izutsumi. Days later, Marcille is affected by Nightmares, a monster that causes bad dreams and eventually death from exhaustion. Laios is able to lucid dream himself into Marcille's dream where a terrified adolescent Marcille is running away from a monster. Laios deduces it represents her fear of her loved ones dying. Thanks to his encouragement, Marcille is ultimately able to defeat the monster. An awakened Marcille only vaguely remembers a puppy helping her find a treasure. Laios reveals Nightmares are actually clam-like monsters that nested in Marcille's pillow and are perfectly edible cooked in butter and soy sauce.
20	"Ice Golem"; Transliteration: "Aisu Gōremu" (Japanese: アイスゴーレム)	Takashi Kotori	Nanami Higuchi	Emi Tamura	May 16, 2024
20	"Barometz"; Transliteration: "Baromettsu" (Japanese: バロメッツ)	Takashi Kotori	Nanami Higuchi	Emi Tamura	May 16, 2024
The party makes it to where they fought the dragon the first time and recovers the equipment they left behind. Senshi finds one of his golem dolls has fallen down a sewer and bonded with the snow, forming an ice golem. Chilchuck cracks the ice, allowing Izutsumi to destroy it. As the golem contained frozen fish, Senshi makes fried fish and harpy egg custard. Chilchuck later crafts Izutsumi her own adventurer's bag while Marcille makes her clothing better suited for the snow. During a disagreement over her refusal to eat monsters, Izutsumi explains she fears catching incurable monster diseases. Izutsumi soon spots a tree growing a sheep and rushes to harvest the meat, unaware it is a barometz and a food source for dire wolves. When Izutsumi selfishly leaves the battle, she is attacked and almost killed by a wolf until Marcille drives away it and heals her. As the wolves ate the adult sheep, all Senshi can harvest is an unripe barometz fruit containing an unborn lamb. He makes lamb chops with fruit sauce, which a skeptical Izutsumi ends up enjoying. She then takes sadistic delight in forcing Marcille to eat it as well.
21	"Egg"; Transliteration: "Tamago" (Japanese: 卵)	Aika Ikeda	Kimiko Ueno	Ryūtarō Suzuki	May 23, 2024
21	"The Golden Country"; Transliteration: "Ōgonkyō" (Japanese: 黄金郷)	Aika Ikeda	Kimiko Ueno	Ryūtarō Suzuki	May 23, 2024
Shuro and Kabru see that the local Lord is being visited by the Canaries, elvish dungeon specialists. Not wanting the Canaries to take ownership of the dungeon, Shuro and Kabru propose that they could seal the dungeon. The Canaries put Kabru in charge but warn him they will invade the dungeon if his plan fails. Meanwhile in the dungeon, Izutsumi senses a spirit, confirming Laios' recent hallucinations were actually a ghost. The ghost can finally explain it wants them to meet someone. Agreeing, the party is teleported to the legendary Golden Castle where farmers are living with tamed monsters. The village makes Izutsumi strangely docile as the monster taming spells affect her too. Chief Yaad, Delgal's grandson, explains the sorcerer cursed them with immortality. As a result, Delgal fled to the surface to get help but never returned. Once Marcille reveals what happened to him, Yaad explains the winged lion that originally guarded the dungeon was imprisoned by the sorcerer but first prophesized his own death by a warrior with a winged sword who would become king of the dungeon. Laios worries this refers to him and is overwhelmed.
22	"Griffin"; Transliteration: "Gurifin" (Japanese: グリフィン)	Yūki Kono	Yū Satō	Masaru Sakamoto	May 30, 2024
22	"Familiars"; Transliteration: "Tsukaima" (Japanese: 使い魔)	Yūki Kono	Yū Satō	Masaru Sakamoto	May 30, 2024
Yaad reveals Thistle, the sorcerer, was originally the court jester for Delgal's father but Delgal encouraged him to study magic until he became Royal Magician. Laios still wishes to talk with Thistle so Yaad advises the party to free the winged lion. Once they leave, Thistle furiously confronts Yaad. The party return to the dungeon where they are attacked by a griffin, which Senshi surprisingly has a phobia of, and his attempt to escape causes it to carry him away. While Marcille summons familiars to track him, Chilchuck becomes curious after he realizes there are various inconsistencies concerning Senshi. The familiars knock the griffin to the ground where Laios kills it, saving Senshi. As the familiars were made from their food supplies, Laios wastes no time and cooks them, angering Marcille. Meanwhile, Senshi refuses to butcher the griffin. In an effort to learn about him, Chilchuck reveals more about himself, including that he actually has a family he has not seen in years. In turn, Senshi reveals that in his youth, he was a miner and one day his crew accidentally found the Golden Castle, making them the very first people to enter the dungeon.
23	"Griffin Soup"; Transliteration: "Gurifin no Sūpu" (Japanese: グリフィンのスープ)	Yuichi Shimohira	Nanami Higuchi	Yuichi Shimohira	June 6, 2024
23	"Dumplings -1-"; Transliteration: "Danpuringu 1" (Japanese: ダンプリング1)	Yuichi Shimohira	Nanami Higuchi	Yuichi Shimohira	June 6, 2024
While lost in the dungeon, a griffin killed most of the dwarves until only Senshi and two others, Gillin and Brigan, remained. Brigan and Gillin left the hideout arguing; Brigan and the Griffin were both killed, and Gillin returned alone with Griffin meat he fed to Senshi. When Gillin disappeared, Senshi suspected the meat was Brigan. Senshi escaped the dungeon but his guilt drove him to begin hunting monsters. After finally eating the griffin, Senshi does not recognize the taste. However, Laios deduces it was actually a hippogriff. With changeling mushrooms, Laios magically transforms the griffin meat into hippogriff meat, which Senshi recognizes immediately. Free from his trauma, a thankful Senshi decides to continue the journey. Unfortunately, the mushrooms cause the party to switch species. While searching for more mushrooms to change back, they actually find the door to move deeper into the dungeon. Kensuke surprises them by emerging from the sword to open the magically locked door, which awakens some nearby gargoyles. Unable to fight, the party flees through the door and find themselves in a dwarven stronghold from the days of the ancient elf/dwarf war. With nothing else to do they make camp and cook hippogriff dumplings.
24	"Dumplings -2-"; Transliteration: "Danpuringu 2" (Japanese: ダンプリング2)	Yuichi Shimohira	Kimiko Ueno	Nobutoshi Ogura	June 13, 2024
24	"Bacon and Eggs"; Transliteration: "Bēkon'Eggu" (Japanese: ベーコンエッグ)	Yuichi Shimohira	Kimiko Ueno	Nobutoshi Ogura	June 13, 2024
Laios wonders if the mushrooms are powerful enough to transform Falin back to human. The gargoyles soon attack again and in the chaos, Kensuke transforms. Marcille realizes everyone is covered in mushroom spores and by holding hands, they become a magic circle. The gargoyles are turned into harmless statues and the party quickly wash off the spores. Senshi makes more dumplings but uses the spores to transform them into different varieties. The next morning, everyone is back to normal so they explore the dwarf stronghold and get stuck in a trolley that automatically sets off even deeper into the dungeon. Senshi comes up with the idea that to separate Falin from the dragon and make her human again, they might need to cut off her dragon body parts and then eat them to stop them from healing and reattaching to Falin. Laios is worried that this plan could take years to accomplish, unless they ask for help from other parties and everyone they have met in the dungeon. Regardless, they must first find the winged lion. Meanwhile, Kabru, Namari and Shuro enter the dungeon, as do the Canaries.

== Home media release ==
=== Japanese ===
Kadokawa (Japan – Region 2/A)
Vol.	Episodes	Cover character	Release date	Ref.
1	1–6	Laios Touden	April 24, 2024	
2	7–12	Marcille Donato	May 29, 2024	
3	13–18	Chilchuck Tims	June 26, 2024	
4	19–24	Senshi	July 24, 2024	
