= Rony Barrak =

Lebanese musician and composer

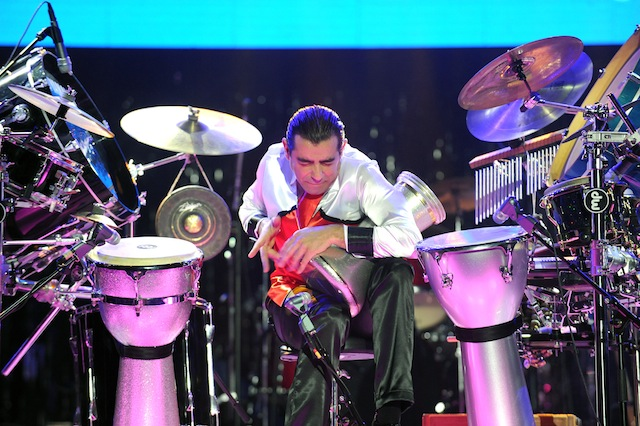
Rony Barrak

Rony Barrak is a Lebanese darbouka player and composer. He began playing the darbouka (Middle Eastern Tabla) at the age of four.

== Career ==
Barrak made his first TV performance at the age of seven and then proceeded to improve his skills through school and family performances. Rony started his first music studies at the age of sixteen, at Holy Spirit University of Kaslik (Music School department) in Lebanon. At the age of seventeen, Rony won the Gold Medal in a competition on the Lebanese Broadcasting Corporation International (LBCI) television for talented young musicians in Lebanon and the Middle East.

He moved to London in 1990, where he studied orchestral percussion and drums at the Guildhall School of Music and Drama. He later taught Middle Eastern Percussion at Trinity College of Music.

Since 2009 he has composed, orchestrated and premiered three symphonic compositions, including a percussion interlude and a Darbouka cadenza, that was performed in the US, Germany and Armenia, plus other work for chamber orchestra that was premiered at Al Bustan Festival in Lebanon 2016. In the same year, he was also commissioned by “Ensemble mini orchestra” in Berlin to orchestrate & perform “Romanian Folk Dances” by Béla Bartók (Bartok beyond borders project). He introduced his Middle Eastern touch to the orchestration that was premiered in Berlin 2016 and 4 other concerts in Budapest and Germany 2022.

Besides original symphonic compositions, Rony achieved success between 2005 and 2023 by being the first Darbouka soloist performing with Symphonic Game Music Concerts produced by Thomas Böcker (Merregnon Studios). Rony was featured in five video game music albums. Over the years, he has been a darbouka soloist with orchestras such as the London Symphony Orchestra, Tokyo Philharmonic Orchestra and WDR Radio Orchestra.

In 1999, his solo performance with his British band at Royal Albert Hall in London UK, and 2004 “Harem world tour” with Sarah Brightman, of 110 concerts in 4 continents. Rony makes regular appearances on television and radio shows in Lebanon and throughout the Middle East, including interviews and solo performances, consistently demonstrating a strong rapport with worldwide audiences. Further, Rony served as the musical director and composer for a Saturday night television show (Iktachafna el Baroud) on LBCI TV-Lebanon in 2006 and on “What the viewers want” on MBC TV in 1997. Since 2005 till 2022 Barrak has been invited to an international World Music Festival “Morgenland Festival” in Osnabrück, Germany, as he is also a major member of an international touring fusion Band that was formed in 2012 “Morgenland all Star Band” produced by Michael Dreyer.

Barrak became a British citizen in year 2000 and has dual citizenship of the U.K. and Lebanon.

== Orchestral compositions ==
- 2022 "Beirut Sensations" with Yakima Symphony Orchestra conducted by Lawrence Golan at The Capitol Theatre, Yakima, Washington State, USA
- 2022 "Beirut Sensations" with York Symphony Orchestra conducted by Lawrence Golan at Appell Center, York, Pennsylvania, USA
- 2022 "Beirut Sensations" with Denver Philharmonic Orchestra conducted by Lawrence Golan at Antonia Brico Stage, Central Presbyterian Church, Denver, Colorado, USA
- 2014 "Beirut Sensations & Phoenicia" with the Academic Theatre Symphonic Orchestra of Yerevan conducted by Karen Drugaryan, Yerevan, Armenia
- 2012 "Boulder Sensations" (world premiere) Boulder, USA With the Boulder Philharmonic Orchestra, conducted by Michael Butterman.
- 2011 "Phoenicia" (world premiere) & Beirut Sensations, Bremen, Germany, with the Bremer Philharmonic Orchestra, conducted by Markus Poschner and broadcast live on Bremen Radio.
- 2009 "Beirut Sensations" (world premiere) Boulder, Colorado, USA.

== Awards and honors ==
- 2023 Acadêmico de Honra” Rony Barrak was chosen to be an “Academic of Honor” member of the Lebanese-Brazilian Academy of Literature, Arts and Sciences in Brazil. With huge privileged to share this Honorary position next to the greats and remarkable “Gabriel Yared” and “Paulo Coelho” including other exceptional personalities. Many thanks to the consul general of Lebanon in Rio de Janeiro, Dr. Alejandro Bitar, for his constant trust and support.

https://academialibanobrasil.com.br/portfolio-item/academico-30-2/

- 2010 Appreciation award by the ambassador of Lebanon-Buenos Aires-Argentina
- 2010 Appreciation award by the Juventudo de la uniõn cultural Argentino-Libanesa
- 2010 Appreciation award by the president of Saint George Hospital
- 2005 Honorary Citizen of the City Dearborn, Michigan
- 1988 Gold Medal-Studio al Fan on LBCI Television-Lebanon

== Discography ==
- Aramba (1999)
- Karizma (EMI, 2005)
- Darbouka City (EMI, 2010)
- Cycle of Return (2017)
