= 18 rating =

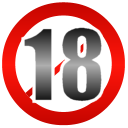
Under 18 Icon

18 rating refers to a type of age-based content rating that applies to media entertainment, such as films, television shows and computer games. The following articles document the rating across a range of countries and mediums:

== Ratings ==
- 18 (British Board of Film Classification), a prohibitive rating used to regulate age based admission to films in the United Kingdom and Ireland
- R18 (British Board of Film Classification), a more restrictive rating used for hardcore pornography in the United Kingdom
- X rating, a common variant of the UK's 18 and R18 ratings used across many countries

== Classification organizations ==
- Australian Classification Board (R18+ and X18+, but very similar film content as M - Mature rating)
- Brazilian advisory rating system (18)
- British Board of Film Classification (18 and R18)
- Canadian motion picture rating system
  - Canadian Home Video Rating System (18A, R and A – 18 equivalents)
  - Manitoba Film Classification Board (18A, R and A)
  - Maritime Film Classification Board (18A, R and A)
  - British Columbia Film Classification Office (18A, R and A)
  - Saskatchewan Film and Video Classification Board (18A, R and A)
  - Ontario Film Review Board (18A, R and A)
  - Régie du cinéma (Quebec) (18+)
- Central Board of Film Certification (A – 18 equivalent)
- Common Sense Media (18+)
- Computer Entertainment Rating Organization (Z – 18 equivalent)
- Conseil supérieur de l'audiovisuel (18)
- Dirección General de Radio, Televisión y Cinematografía (C and D – 18 equivalents)
- Eirin (R18+)
- Entertainment Software Rating Board (Adults Only – 18 equivalent, but very similar game content than Mature 17+ equivalent)
- Film Censorship Board of Malaysia (18)
- Freiwillige Selbstkontrolle der Filmwirtschaft (18)
- Hong Kong motion picture rating system (III – 18 equivalent)
- Irish Film Classification Office (18)
- Korea Media Rating Board (R – 18 equivalent)
- Media Development Authority (M18)
- Motion Picture Association of America film rating system (NC-17 – 18 equivalent)
- Movie and Television Review and Classification Board (R-18)
- National Audiovisual Institute (Finland) (18)
- National Bureau of Classification (NBC) (18+ and 18+R)
- National Institute of Cinema and Audiovisual Arts (18)
- Norwegian Media Authority (18)
- Office of Film and Literature Classification (New Zealand) (R18 and RP18)
- Pan European Game Information (18)
- Unterhaltungssoftware Selbstkontrolle (18)

== Systems ==
- Motion picture content rating system, a range of classification systems for films that commonly use the age 18 as part of its regulatory criteria
- Television content rating system, a range of classification systems for television broadcasts that commonly use the age 18 as part of its regulatory criteria
- Video game content rating system, a range of classification systems for video games that commonly use the age 18 as part of its regulatory criteria
- Mobile software content rating system, a range of classification systems for mobile software that commonly use the age 18 as part of its regulatory criteria

== See also ==
- Adults Only (disambiguation)
- R18 (disambiguation)
- Censorship in France
- 12 rating
- 14 rating
- 15 rating
