= 14 rating =

14 rating refers to a type of age-based content rating that applies to media entertainment, such as films, television shows and computer games. The following articles document the rating across a range of countries and mediums:

== Classification organizations ==
- Brazilian advisory rating system (14)
- Canadian motion picture rating system (14A)
  - Canadian Home Video Rating System
  - Manitoba Film Classification Board
  - Maritime Film Classification Board
  - British Columbia Film Classification Office
  - Saskatchewan Film and Video Classification Board
  - Ontario Film Review Board
- TV Parental Guidelines (TV-14)
- Common Sense Media (14+)

== Systems ==
- Motion picture content rating system, a range of classification systems for films that commonly use the age 14 as part of its regulatory criteria
- Television content rating system, a range of classification systems for television broadcasts that commonly use the age 14 as part of its regulatory criteria
- Video game content rating system, a range of classification systems for video games that commonly use the age 14 as part of its regulatory criteria
- Mobile software content rating system, a range of classification systems for mobile software that commonly use the age 14 as part of its regulatory criteria
