= Adults Only =

Adults Only or variants refers to

== Entertainment content rating ==
Many age based content ratings denote content deemed suitable only for adults, and are often identified or defined as "Adults Only":

- Adults Only (AO); assigned to video games by the Entertainment Software Rating Board (ESRB)
  - List of AO-rated video games; a list of games given the "Adults Only 18+" rating by the ESRB
- NC-17 – Adults Only; assigned to films by the Motion Picture Association of America film rating system (MPAA)
  - List of NC-17 rated films; a list of films rated NC-17 by the MPAA
- 18 rating (many variants), a common "adults only" rating used by classification organizations
- R18 (disambiguation) (many variants), an "adults only" rating used by several classification organizations
- X rating, a common "adults only" rating used by classification organizations

== Visual and audio media ==
=== Films ===
- Adults Only (film), premiering at the 63rd Venice International Film Festival

=== Albums ===
- Adults Only, album by Peter Rauhofer and Club 69 1994
- Adults Only, album by Mungo Jerry
- Adults Only: The Final Album, Aaron Hall (singer) 2005
- Adults Only, Mike Botts (2000)
- Adults Only, Ringo Sheena
- For Adults Only, Bill Cosby album
- Pearl Bailey Sings For Adults Only, album by Pearl Bailey (1959)

=== Songs ===
- "Adults Only", a song by Slick Rick on the album The Art of Storytelling
- "For Adults Only", The Compositions Of Al Cohn 1953
- "Adults Only", song by Manfred Mann from Soft Vengeance
