= 15 rating =

15 rating refers to a type of age-based content rating that applies to media entertainment, such as films, television shows and computer games. The following articles document the rating across a range of countries and mediums:

== Classification organizations ==
- Australian Classification Board (MA15+ and M)
- British Board of Film Classification (15)
- Common Sense Media (15+)
- Computer Entertainment Rating Organization (C – 15 equivalent)
- Dirección General de Radio, Televisión y Cinematografía (B-15)
- Eirin (R15+)
- Irish Film Classification Office (15 and 15A)
- Korea Media Rating Board (15)
- Norwegian Media Authority (15)
- Office of Film and Literature Classification (New Zealand) (R15)

== Systems ==
- Motion picture content rating system, a range of classification systems for films that commonly use the age 15 as part of its regulatory criteria
- Television content rating system, a range of classification systems for television broadcasts that commonly use the age 15 as part of its regulatory criteria
- Video game content rating system, a range of classification systems for video games that commonly use the age 15 as part of its regulatory criteria
- Mobile software content rating system, a range of classification systems for mobile software that commonly use the age 15 as part of its regulatory criteria
