= Canadian motion picture rating systems =

Film ratings in Canada

Motion picture ratings in Canada are mostly a provincial responsibility, and each province has its own legislation regarding exhibition and admission. For home video purposes, a single Canadian Home Video Rating System rating consisting of an average of the participating provincial ratings is displayed on retail packages, although various provinces may have rules on display and sale, especially for the R and A categories.

There are currently three film classification offices rating commercially released movies in Canada, each an agency of a provincial government:

- Alberta Film Classification provides ratings for Alberta, the Northwest Territories, and Nunavut.
- British Columbia Film Classification Office, a division of Consumer Protection BC, provides ratings for British Columbia, Manitoba, and formerly Saskatchewan.
- Ministère de la Culture et des Communications provides ratings for Quebec (Formerly by Régie du cinéma du Québec).

The province of Saskatchewan retained its own classification board, Saskatchewan Film Classification, but it has used ratings provided by British Columbia since 1997 for almost all commercially distributed films. Similarly, the Manitoba Film Classification Board was dissolved in 2018, and the province now uses the ratings assigned by British Columbia. Film distributors pay additional fees to Consumer Protection BC for certification in other provinces; they can also pay for certification in one or more provinces if they do not plan on distributing their film in British Columbia, although films to be shown only in Saskatchewan are still rated by that province's film classification office.

Yukon does not have a compulsory rating system; the two Landmark Cinemas commercial theatres in Whitehorse "assign the average of film classification for Canada." The Ontario Film Review Board was abolished in September 2019 as part of cuts by the Doug Ford government; the province temporarily entered into an agreement with British Columbia to use its ratings in the interim while a "modernized" framework was developed by the provincial government. The Film Content Information Act, 2020 subsequently abolished the requirement for films exhibited at cinemas to receive a formal classification, instead placing the responsibility on exhibitors to provide and display their own ratings information "to support informed viewing choices". Saskatchewan adopted a nearly identical bill in 2024, which took effect on April 1, 2026. Additionally, the Maritime Film Classification Board, run by the Nova Scotia Alcohol & Gaming Authority, provided ratings for Nova Scotia, New Brunswick, and Prince Edward Island, and was used voluntarily in Newfoundland. This board was shut down in 2025.

== Canadian ratings except Quebec ==
General Canadian Ratings

In the past there was a wide range of rating categories and practices in the various provinces. However, the five rating systems outside Quebec now all use categories and logos derived from the Canadian Home Video Rating System. In general, the categories are:

- G – General – Suitable for all ages.
- PG – Parental Guidance – Parental guidance advised. There is no age restriction but some material may not be suitable for all children.
- 14A – 14 Accompaniment – Persons under 14 years of age must be accompanied by an adult.
- 18A – 18 Accompaniment – Persons under 18 years of age must be accompanied by an adult. Additionally, admittance restricted to people 14 years of age or older in the Maritimes and Manitoba.
- R – Restricted – Admittance restricted to people 18 years of age or older.
- A – Adult – Admittance restricted to people 18 years of age or older. Sole purpose of the film is the portrayal of sexually explicit activity and/or explicit violence. In Alberta, the A category is used only for sexually explicit products. Manitoba does not have this category, and instead uses a barcode labelling system for adult home video products. In British Columbia, the A symbol is a red octagon rather than a blue diamond.

This system was adopted by Alberta and British Columbia in 1997, Manitoba in 2003 and the Maritimes in 2005.

There is also a common stock of Information Pieces ("Frightening Scenes", "Coarse Language", etc.), although different boards may have additional qualifiers.

Each board is responsible for assigning a rating to films, and while most movies will likely obtain the same rating, there can be differences. For instance, the 2006 film The Texas Chainsaw Massacre: The Beginning was rated 18A in Alberta, British Columbia and Ontario, while Manitoba and the Maritimes gave the film an R, and Quebec gave the film a 16+. Also, 2016's Deadpool was rated 14A in Alberta, British Columbia, and Saskatchewan, yet rated 18A in Ontario and Manitoba; 2018's Deadpool 2 was rated 18A in Ontario and British Columbia, yet 14A in Alberta and Manitoba. All of these films were R in the USA.

Canada also receives a great deal of American advertising that features MPA film ratings. These ratings do not have any legal effect; however, they are typically similar to those applied by Canadian classification bodies.

== Quebec system ==
Régie du cinéma Ratings Labels.

In Quebec, the Régie du cinéma rates all films and videos. The Régie is a governmental agency overseen by the Quebec Ministry of Culture and Communications. Its purview devolves from the Cinema Act (CQLR c. C-18.1). The same classifications are used for television broadcasts.

The ratings and their optional complementary indications are as follows:

- G Visa général (General Rating): May be viewed, rented or purchased by people of all ages.
  G-rated content that may not be suitable for children under eight is denoted with Déconseillé aux jeunes enfants (Not suitable for young children).
- 13+ 13 ans et plus (13 years and over): May be viewed, rented or purchased by people 13 years of age or over. Children under 13 may be admitted only if accompanied by an adult.
- 16+ 16 ans et plus (16 years and over): May be viewed, rented or purchased by people 16 years of age or over.
- 18+ 18 ans et plus (18 years and over): May be viewed, rented or purchased by people 18 years of age or over.

While not a classification per se, educational or pedagogical movies, sport and physical exercise programs, and promotional materials are exempt from classification.

The Régie does not cut sequences from movies; they are rated in the format provided by the production company. Nonetheless, the Régie has the authority to deny classification, in which case the movie cannot be distributed in any format in the province of Quebec.

== Criticism ==
In certain provinces in Canada, the rating system has come under criticism as being too lenient. For example, in British Columbia, the film Scary Movie (2000) was given an 18A rating, but was re-rated on appeal by the Motion Picture and Liquor Appeal Board to a 14A. This resulted in a record number of complaints to the British Columbia Film Classification Office from parents who felt the film should have been rated 18A. Many parents wrote letters to their local newspaper warning others that the film may be inappropriate for their fourteen-year-olds. Theatre owners complained about the inappropriate rating as well.

Conversely, the Saskatchewan Film and Video Classification Board faced criticism for briefly refusing to classify Exit to Eden (1994), despite no other jurisdiction in Canada having done so. In the wake of the criticism, Saskatchewan eventually began to use the ratings provided by the British Columbia Film Classification Office instead.

== See also ==
- Motion picture content rating system
