= Motion Picture Association – Canada =

Canadian branch of the MPA

- Company type: Private
- Industry: Film, trade group
- Founded: 1922
- Headquarters: Toronto, Ontario, Canada
- Key people: Charles H. Rivkin, Chairman and CEO (MPA); Wendy Noss, President (MPA-Canada)
- Services: Canadian Home Video Rating System
- Parent: Motion Picture Association
- Subsidiaries: Motion Picture Classification Corporation of Canada
- Website: www.mpa-canada.org

The Motion Picture Association – Canada (French: Association Cinématographique – Canada), or MPA-Canada, is a film industry trade group that speaks for and represents the major U.S. producers and distributors of motion pictures, streaming media, and television programming in Canada.

It is the Canadian counterpart of the American Motion Picture Association (MPA).

Through the Motion Picture Classification Corporation of Canada (MPCCC), MPA-Canada administers the Canadian Home Video Rating System.

== Functions ==
The organization exists to promote the interests of its member organizations, and expand the Canadian film and video industry. It lobbies at the provincial and federal government levels to advance its agenda.

MPA–Canada administers the Canadian Home Video Rating System (CHVRS), though unlike the MPA it does not rate films itself, instead depending on provincial ratings.

The organization functions as copyright advocate, and directs an anti-piracy initiative.

== Member organizations ==
Only American companies are part of the organization; there are no Canadian members.

- Walt Disney Studios
- Sony Pictures Entertainment
- Netflix Studios
- Paramount Pictures
- Universal Pictures
- Warner Bros. Entertainment
- Amazon MGM Studios and Prime Video
