= Canadian Home Video Rating System =

Voluntary film rating classification system

The Canadian Home Video Rating System (CHVRS) (French: Classement canadien des vidéocassettes) is a voluntary rating classification system applied to films on DVDs and Blu-rays. It is administered by the Motion Picture Classification Corporation of Canada, a subsidiary of the Motion Picture Association – Canada (MPA–C). Ratings are "averaged" from ones given by participating provincial film boards: Alberta, British Columbia (whose ratings are also followed in Manitoba and Saskatchewan), Maritimes (New Brunswick, Nova Scotia, and Prince Edward Island), and applied by the distributor to home video packaging. These ratings only applies to home ratings, as theater ratings are distributed by the provincial film board of the relevant province.

== Canadian Home Video Ratings System ==
Canada has no federal rating system for the theatrical release of motion pictures; such controls lie in the jurisdiction of the provinces and is enacted through six film classification boards across the country. However this system for home video (on cassette, DVD, etc.) came into effect in May 1995, at the initiative of the Canadian Motion Picture Distributors Association and it works as a uniform Canadian ratings system.

Although the CHVRS is a voluntary industry classification some of the provinces have incorporated it into legislation regarding home video sales and rentals, and CHVRS labelling is found on most home video products sold in Canada. Saskatchewan, Manitoba, and the Maritime provinces have regulations requiring CHVRS labelling or the equivalent while British Columbia, Alberta, and Ontario do not, although most provinces have additional regulations regarding the labelling and display of adult video material.

In Quebec, a separate classification system is in effect under provincial law and administered by the Ministry of Culture and Communications (prior to 2017 administered by the Régie du cinéma). All home video products sold in the province must be appropriately labelled.

Ontario previously had a provincial film board, which was established in 2015. The board was later disbanded in September of 2019.

== Classifications ==
The symbols used to represent the ratings on video packages
The ratings used in Quebec.

The CHV rating system is as follows:

G - Suitable for viewing by all ages. (5)
PG - Parental guidance advised. Some themes or content may not be suitable for children. (4)
14A - Suitable for people 14 years of age or older. Those under 14 should view with an adult. No rental or purchase by those under 14. Parents cautioned. May contain violence, coarse language and/or sexually suggestive scenes. (3)
18A - Suitable for people 18 years of age or older. Persons under 18 should view with an adult. No rental or purchase by those under 18. Parents strongly cautioned. Will likely contain explicit violence, frequent coarse language, sexual activity and/or horror. (2)
R - Restricted to 18 years and older. No rental or purchase by those under 18. Contents not suitable for minors. Contains frequent sexual activity, brutality/graphic violence, intense horror, and/or other disturbing content. (1)
E - Exempt. Contains material not subject to classification, such as documentaries, nature, travel, music, arts and culture, sports and leisure, educational and instructional information.

== Information Pieces ==
Beginning in 2003, "information pieces" are applied depending on the pieces used by the provinces for a certain film. The information pieces are as follows:

Not Recommended For Young Children - The film may be inappropriate for young children. An example might be the death of a family pet, a complicated family breakdown, or images considered frightening or disturbing for the very young.

Not Recommended For Children - The film may include scenes that reflect a more mature situation, such as drug use/abuse.

Frightening Scenes - The film contains images that might shock or frighten a person. These scenes might be found in a thriller, suspense, or war genre.

Mature Theme - Contains images or storylines that may be disturbing or incomprehensible to minors. The film may contain portrayals of domestic violence, racism, religious matters, death, or controversial social issues.

Coarse Language - Product contains profanity, threats, slurs, sexual references, or sexual innuendo.

Crude Content - Material or humour that is unrefined or coarse and that may be seen as harsh, rude, or offensive.

Nudity - Contains images of full frontal, partial, or rear nudity. Context will be determined by the situation, clarity, detail, repetition, and whether the nudity is in a non-sexual or sexual situation.

Sexual Content - Film may contain images and/or verbal references of sexual themes, sexual innuendo, fondling, implied sexual activity, and simulated sexual activity.

Violence - May contain restrained portrayals of non-graphic violence, portrayals of violence with some bloodletting and/or tissue damage, and frequent more prolonged portrayals of violence resulting in bloodletting and tissue damage. The degree, frequency and intensity of the acts of violence will be factors in the classification decision.

Disturbing Content - Indicates the expected natural reaction by an audience to any elements of a film, including the tone of a film, pertaining to distress or suffering. This includes the implication or threat of physical and/or psychological violence, even when violence is not depicted.

Substance Abuse - Descriptive scenes depicting the use of illegal substances, the excessive use of tobacco, or the use of alcohol resulting in impairment.

Gory Scenes - Graphic images of bloodletting and/or tissue damage. Includes horror or war representations. Degree, frequency, and intensity will also be a major factor in the classification decision. Any media with this category requires at least a 14A rating.

Explicit Sexual Content - Sexual acts, shown in full, clear, unequivocal, and realistic detail, that may or may not be gratuitous to the film. It is true that this category can only be used with the R rating.

Brutal Violence - Visually explicit portrayals of violence, which may be characterized by extreme brutality, extreme bloodletting, and/or extreme tissue damage. May include images of torture, horror, or war. This category is mostly used with the 18A rating or higher, however the 14A rating may use this category depending on the content level. On top of that, Extreme Violence, Explicit Violence, and Graphic Violence would have the same description.

Sexual Violence - The degradation of an individual in a sexual manner. May contain images of non-consensual acts with the intent to inflict harm, for example: simulated rape, and/or the use of threat to force compliance in sexual activity.

Language May Offend - Contains language that may be offensive to some groups, i.e. sacrilegious language such as Goddamn; also used for PG films that contain explicatives.

== Process ==
In order to determine an average rating, a numerical value is applied to each of the five rating classifications. The eight participating provincial ratings are applied the appropriate numerical value and then an average is calculated. For example, if a film receives five 14As and three 18As, the numerical values would be 3, 3, 3, 3, 3, 4, 4, and 4 (the Maritimes count as three provinces, and Saskatchewan is counted separately from British Columbia) which gives an average of 3.4, which would equate to a 14A Canadian Home Video Rating.

== Notes ==
The rating symbols are embedded in the artwork or stickers applied to the packaging by the distributor. When the system was introduced in 1995, many of the provinces did not use a rating similar to the 18A (or in some cases, the R category). This results in numerous inconsistencies and misprints.

Home video ratings in Canada do not necessarily correspond with similar ratings in the United States or elsewhere. For example, sexually explicit series such as Girls, Orange is the New Black, and Shameless, all TV-MA rated under the U.S. system, are only rated 14A under the Canadian system. Other series with sexual and violent content, such as Bitten and Black Sails have been released to DVD and Blu-ray in Canada with no content rating at all.
