= Dirección General de Radio, Televisión y Cinematografía =

Mexican government agency

General Directorate of Radio, Television and Film
- Dirección General de Radio, Televisión y Cinematografía
- Abbreviation: RTC
- Formation: July 6, 1977; 49 years ago
- Type: Broadcast content regulator and film and television rating board
- Headquarters: Mexico City
- Director: Rodolfo González Fernández
- Parent organization: Secretariat of the Interior
- Website: dgrtc.segob.gob.mx

The Dirección General de Radio, Televisión y Cinematografía (General Directorate of Radio, Television and Film), known by its acronym RTC, is an agency of the Mexican Secretariat of the Interior (SEGOB). It rates films and television programs broadcast in the country, and it also manages the time allotted to the government on broadcast television and radio stations, including the production and distribution of La Hora Nacional, a weekly program heard on all radio stations in Mexico.

Its current director is Rodolfo González Fernández.

== History ==
The RTC was created on July 6, 1977, by a decree published in the Diario Oficial de la Federación. Its first director was Margarita López Portillo. When it was created, it took over various tasks, including the operations of the national radio station Radio México, rural television services and other radio and television stations owned by the federal government and the management of the National Film Archive. It also proceeded to liquidate the nearly 40-year-old National Film Bank. In 1983, the broadcast stations under RTC's purview were transferred to new government institutes. In 1985, it received further power by issuing opinions on broadcast stations during their concession renewals (managed by the SCT), and in 1989, it took over production of La Hora Nacional, government commercials, and mandatory cadenas nacionales. At this time, it also began rating movies and television programs.

In 2006, the RTC closed its nine regional offices which had monitored broadcast stations throughout the country, in favor of monitoring stations from Mexico City only.

From 2014 to 2018, RTC was headed by Amador Díaz Moguel.

== Functions ==
The RTC has several functions in the three media covered in its remit:

=== Government broadcasts and advertising ===
In radio, the RTC coordinates the broadcasting of government public service announcements and cadenas nacionales across the country's radio stations and makes new PSAs and content available over the internet. In most years, except during election campaigns when electoral authorities and parties take it over, the RTC controls 88 percent of the time allotted to the government, with the remaining 12 percent managed by the National Electoral Institute. Likewise, the RTC also distributes PSAs for air on television stations, as well as longer-form programs that must be at least five minutes in length.

=== Rating, standards and censorship ===
The RTC also has the power to regulate content and programming in broadcasting and film, as the manager of the country's film and television rating systems. It issues the required permits to broadcast religious programming and sanctions violators of its policies on language, standards of conduct and station contests. From 2013 to 2015, however, it rarely used this power, only issuing two fines, one to a Monterrey radio station for "corrupt language" and another to a Mérida broadcaster for improperly held contests.

The RTC's ratings scale includes AA, A, B, B15, C, and D classifications. On television, the rating of a program determines the time period when it may be broadcast: for instance, programs rated B15 can only be aired after 7pm, those rated C can only be aired after 9pm, and D-rated programming can only be screened after midnight, notably including telenovelas that deal with drug trafficking or cartels. Other media (such as television programs and movies) may be rated by other entities. The RTC rating system is one of various motion picture rating systems that are used to help parents decide what films and TV are appropriate for their children.

The RTC has also been far more lax than it once was in issuing permits for religious programming; while it issued 7,536 such authorizations between 2000 and 2001, it issued 380,263 of them in 2013 and 2014, a more than 50-fold increase.

=== RTC film and television ratings ===
Rating	Preferential audience	Preferred timetable	Previous TV message	Most common uses	Description of treated topics				
Rating	Preferential audience	Preferred timetable	Previous TV message	Most common uses	General	Violence	Language	Sex	Drugs
	All audiences; Understandable for children under 7 years	Any time	«[This program is] suitable for children»	Educational cartoons or soft productions.	Informative programs.; Assigned to productions easy to understand.; Plots and themes of particular interest for children under 7 years old are chosen.; Does not affect the integral development of a child under 7 years of age.	May be minimal, as long as it is not encouraged.; It should not be shocking or traumatic.	Forbidden for this category.	The naked human body is not shown.; Kisses, hugs or pats are presented in a loving, familial or friendly manner.	Forbidden for this category.
	All ages	Any time	«[This program is] suitable for all ages» (in Spanish, Apto para todo público).	Documentary, musical, infantile, family films and those where there are deaths without psychologically shocking violence (whether natural, spontaneous, fantastic, discreet, scientifically unrealistic or mild, among others) are used in this category.	Informative programs.; May have complex themes depending on the profile of the story.; Some programs require parental supervision.; Must be easy to distinguish from reality.	Minimal aggression is allowed against characters, as long as it is not promoted.; It should not be displayed as the only method for solving problems between individuals.	May contain some bold expressions, as long as their use is justified.; Only those that are culturally non-offensive are allowed.	Nudes can be presented as long as they are brief, not frequent or detailed.; Sexual or erotic scenes are not permitted, unless they are used for scientific, educational or documentary purposes.	Cartoons and children's series should not contain scenes of drug use or mentions of them.; Tobacco and alcohol consumption are occasional and justified by the plot. It is obligatory to show their negative consequences.
	Teens 12 years old and older	From 4:00 p.m. to 5:59 a.m.	«This program may contain scenes of violence, addictions, sexuality or language not suitable for audiences under 12 years old.»	This category includes films with horror, suspense and fear of minimal impact; As well as non-extreme violence. It includes infidelities, death threats, explosions, racism, deaths from natural disaster, domestic violence and elder abuse; war or violent scenes, including mutilations without blood in contexts whether historical, fantasy, epic or comic; and varied action scenes. Films that are not attractive to children under 12 can be classified. Depending on the plot, decapitated corpses or heads may be shown.	Informative programs.; In some plots, on the subject, there may have some degree of complexity and require the use of viewers' judgment.	It should not be the main plot.; There may be implied scenes of violence.; Some violent scenes can be shown, as long as the causes are justified and should not be executed for sexual reasons.; It is mandatory to show the consequences.	Double entendre is permissible, but these should not be continuous or offensive and should not be part of the personality of the character.; There can be no scenes of extreme verbal violence.; Can not be used for discriminatory and/or degrading purposes.; In Mexican or foreign films (with Mexican characters), curses common to Mexican Spanish may be used.	There may be nudity, but not frequent.; Sexual scenes can be suggested but not shown.; Sexual behavior is not part of the plot or the main plot.	Topics such as addiction and drugs may be mentioned, but not their consumption.; Occasional consumption of tobacco and/or alcohol.; It is mandatory to show the consequences of abuse.
	15 years old or older	From 7:00 p.m.to 5:59 a.m.	«This program may contain scenes of violence, addictions, sexuality or language not suitable for audiences under 15 years old.»	This category covers films that deal with topics such as drug addiction, homosexuality, displayed murder, implicit suicide and paranormal horror. Films with controversial themes are rated B-15.	Informative programs, with some complexity depending on the subject.; Some plots are not suitable for people under 15 years.; Due to the content, one must have judgment and common sense to differentiate fantasy from reality.	There may be scenes of physical violence, as long as it is not the main plot and is justified by the argument.; Violent scenes can not be detailed.; Any other profile of violence, with or without details, should show the negative consequences.	Indecent words and expressions are permitted, but they should not be part of the profile of the character nor present as a positive attribute.; Can not be used for discriminatory and/or degrading purposes.	Erotic and sexual scenes can be performed, as long as they are implicit and not performed in degrading and/or humiliating contexts.; Occasional partial and full nudity in the background is permissible, without specifically showing genitals.	Drug use may be explicit or constant, but this is minimal and discouraged, and its negative consequences are shown.; Programs cannot encourage drug consumption or show their preparation.
	18 years old or older	From 9:00 p.m. to 5:59 a.m.	«This program may contain scenes of violence, addictions, sexuality or language not suitable for audiences under 18 years old.»	Assassinations by dismemberment or incineration; pedophilia; incest; cannibalism.	A restricted rating.; Several of the issues may be more explicit or less censored.	All horror, even detailed, is authorized.; Programs can not advocate violence or crimes.	Any language can be used.; Can not be used for discriminatory and/or degrading purposes.	There may be erotic nudity without genital presentation.; There may be sexual intercourse (discreetly, implicitly or veiled).	Consumption of drugs is authorized.; Programs cannot defend or promote their consumption or trafficking.; Negative consequences should be shown.
	Adults only	From midnight to 5:00 a. m.	«This program is intended exclusively for audiences over 18 years of age; may contain scenes of extreme violence, addictions, explicit sexuality and/or violent rude language.»		The most restrictive rating.	Violence and profanity are fully authorized, even if they are not part of the plot.		There may be scenes, implicit or direct, of sexual and nude relationships.; Sex may be erotic without being considered pornography.	Scenes of drug use are presented.; There may be mention of drug trafficking, narcotics and related lifestyles.

== Ownership and operation of broadcast stations ==
In 1978, the government nationalized several radio stations that held outstanding debts, owned by Grupo Fórmula. As a result, the RTC-Radio Group was formed, with three stations: XEB, XERPM and XEMP, all in Mexico City. These stations would be transferred to the new Instituto Mexicano de la Radio in 1983.

The rural television service, known as Televisión Cultural de México and quickly changed to Televisión Rural de México and later Televisión de la República Méxicana (from 1980), also was transferred out of the RTC in 1983, to the newly formed Instituto Mexicano de la Televisión.

== See also ==
- Motion picture content rating system
- Television content rating systems
- Motion Picture Association of America
- TV Parental Guidelines
- Canadian motion picture rating system
- Régie du cinéma (Quebec)
