= R18 =

R18, or R-18, may refer to:

== Media content ratings ==
- R18 (British Board of Film Classification)
- R18+ issued by the Australian Classification Board
- R18 issued by the New Zealand Classification Office
- R18+ issued by Eirin in Japan
- R-18 issued by the Philippine Movie and Television Review and Classification Board

== Other uses ==
- R18 (aircraft), a Ukrainian unmanned combat aerial vehicle
- Audi R18, a Le Mans prototype racing car
- BMW R18, a cruiser motorcycle made by BMW during the COVID-19 pandemic
- R18: In use, may form flammable/explosive vapour-air mixture, a risk phrase
- R18.com, a Japanese English-language adult website created by Hokuto Corporation
- R-18 regional road (Montenegro)
- Renault 18, a French automobile
- Rubik R-18 Kánya, a Hungarian light aircraft
- USS R-18 (SS-95), a submarine of the United States Navy

== See also ==
- 18 rating
