= Manitoba Film Classification Board =

Former media classification organisation in Canada

Agency overview
- Dissolved: July 1, 2018
- Parent agency: Manitoba Sport, Culture and Heritage
- Website: www.gov.mb.ca/cp/mfcb/

The Manitoba Film Classification Board (MFCB) was a provincial government organization responsible for rating films and video games rented, sold, or shown in the province of Manitoba. In mid 2018, the Board was dissolved, with its duties being outsourced to British Columbia for film classifications, and transferred to the Entertainment Software Rating Board (ESRB) for video games.

The MFCB consisted of a minimum of 16 community members, and was tasked with providing ratings information about film, videos, DVDs, computer and video games distributed in Manitoba.

== History ==
Film censorship in Manitoba began in 1911 with An Act to Regulate Moving Picture Exhibitions. As Winnipeg was the only place in the province showing films, such censorship would the responsibility of civic government.

In 1916, as films began showing in other centres, the Manitoba Censor Board (MCB) was created under the Public Amusements Act (assented 10 March 1916), with regulation by the Amusements Act soon after. Manitoba would not be the only jurisdiction to establish a film censor board in the wake of cinema:

The proliferation of film censor boards in Canada in the quarter century following the birth of the cinema mirrored, to a degree, the situation in the United States where, from 1907 onwards, state and city bodies sought to control the content of motion pictures. Each Canadian province had its own jurisdiction by the 1930s.

— James M. Skinner, deputy presiding member of the MFCB (1981-1987)

Only two classifications—general and adult—were used by MCB; all films were permissible to everyone since any undesirable material was removed by film editing. (In cases where editing was not possible, films were banned.) By 1933, "permissiveness on the screen had reached a peak with the phenomenal popularity of Mae West, whose dialogue was peppered with innuendo and double entendres."

Until 1934, the Board fell under the Treasury Department, forming part of the section devoted to collecting the amusement taxes. However, public concern would develop over the MCB's dual and conflicting role as the body responsible for both censoring film and taxing film.

As result, the Board would be moved in 1935 to the Department of the Municipal Commissioner; at this time, the person who was appointed Commissioner was also appointed to the chairmanship of the MCB on a part-time basis. In 1948, the MCB was transferred to the newly-created Department of Public Utilities. The board would be composed of the chair, two censors, an inspector, a couple projectionists, and a secretary.

In 1959, the Board rejected the internationally-acclaimed film Laronde, due to the theme of adultery that could not be edited out. The ensuing controversy caused a new film classification to be developed: the Restricted classification, which would be applicable to films deemed suitable for strictly adult audiences, and any one under the age of 17 was inadmissible.

The Board's ability to censor made it the subject of several court cases in 1972, wherein defendants would successfully argue that if a government board had approved a film for public exhibition, another arm of government (in this case, the Department of Justice) should not charge them with the exhibition of that film. In response, the Amusements Act was amended to revoke the Board's authority to censor films. The MCB thus evolved into a classification board, the Manitoba Film Classification Board (MFCB), with the power to classify, but not edit or ban, making Manitoba the only province to not provide its board with the authority to censor.

In 1991, the Home-Use Video Classification and Licensing Regulation of Manitoba came into effect, allowing MFCB the power to classify films that were in video format, as well as to license and regulate the home-use video industry.

In 2003, MFCB classifications were changed its classification system from four tiers to five (G, PG, 14A, 18A, R), using the same symbols as the Canadian Home Video Rating System and the boards of B.C., Alberta, Saskatchewan, Ontario, and the Maritimes. The name for adult video/DVD products for home use was changed from 18+ to Adult, whereby all such products rented and sold in Manitoba must now display the Manitoba bar code.

On 1 June 2005, through the Amusement Amendment Act, the MFCB would gain the power to regulate and enforce age restrictions on video and computer games sold in Manitoba. Under these regulations, video and computer games classified by the Entertainment Software Rating Board (ESRB) were adopted and some age restrictions were now enforced in Manitoba. Thereafter, it would be against the law to sell or rent video and computer games classified as M (mature) 17+ to anyone under the age of 17, or as AO (Adults Only) 18+ to people under 18.

In 2017, the Government of Manitoba announced that it would dissolve the Manitoba Film Classification Board in order to "create efficiency" and streamline the content-classification system in Canada. On 1 July 2018, the MFCB was eliminated and its duties were outsourced to Consumer Protection British Columbia, following the footsteps of Saskatchewan. While the government would maintain the right to inspect or review all film and video games under the new legislation, the new framework replacing the MFCB would nonetheless provide film festivals the freedom to classify movies on their own accord.

== Ratings ==
The following categories were the film and video ratings used by the Manitoba Film Classification Board:

- General (G): Suitable for viewing by all ages.
- Parental Guidance (PG): Parental guidance is advised. Theme or content may not be suitable for all children.
- 14A: Suitable for viewing by persons 14 years of age or older. Persons under 14 must be accompanied by an adult. May contain violence, coarse language, and/or sexually suggestive scenes.
- 18A: Suitable for viewing by persons 18 years of age or older. Persons aged 14 to 17 must be accompanied by an adult. In the province of Manitoba, Children under the age of 14 are banned from viewing the film. May contain explicit violence, frequent coarse language, sexual activity and/or horror.
- Restricted (R): Admittance restricted to persons 18 years of age and older. Persons under 18 years of age are not permitted to attend under any circumstances. Contains frequent sexual activity, brutal/graphic violence (example: torture, mutilation and/or suicide), intense horror and/or other disturbing content that is inappropriate and therefore off-limits for viewing by persons under 18.
- Exempt (E): Films not reviewed or rated. "Any film not subject to, or exempt from classification."
