= Ministry of Culture and Communications (Quebec) =

Canadian provincial government ministry

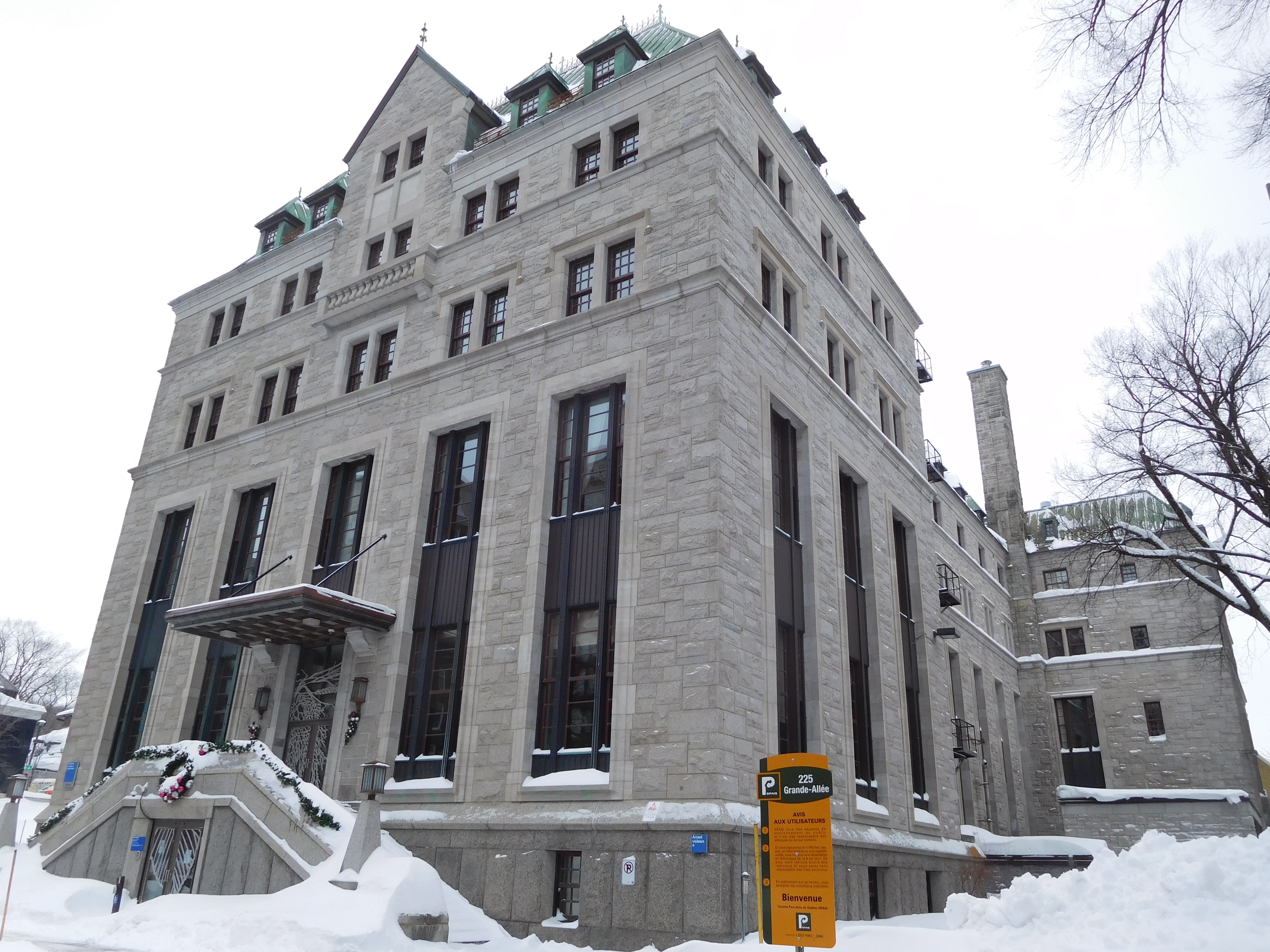
Edifice Guy-Fregault, in Quebec City, where the ministry is located

The Ministry of Culture and Communications (French: Ministère de la Culture et des Communications, pronounced [ministɛʁ də la kyltyʁ e de kɔmynikasjɔ̃]) is responsible for promoting and protecting the culture in the Canadian province of Quebec. The current minister, since 2026, is Pascal Bérubé.

The ministry was formed in 2012 after the immigration portfolio was transferred from the former Minister of Immigration and Cultural Communities, created in 2005, to the new Ministry of Immigration, Diversity and Inclusion. Since 1 April 2017, the Ministry of Culture and Communications also administers Quebec's provincial film classification rating system, acquired from the former Régie du cinéma.

== List of office holders ==
- Kathleen Weil as Minister of Culture and Immigration 2010–2012
- Maka Kotto 2012–2014
- Hélène David 2014–2016
- Luc Fortin 2016–2017
- Marie Montpetit 2017–2018
- Nathalie Roy 2018–2022
- Mathieu Lacombe 2022–2026
- Martine Biron 2026
- Pascal Bérubé 2026–present
