= Motion picture content rating system =

Rates the suitability of movies to its audience

A motion picture content rating system classifies films based on their suitability for audiences due to their treatment of issues such as sex, violence, substance abuse, profanity, or other matters typically deemed unsuitable for children or adolescents. Most countries have some form of rating system that issues determinations variously known as certifications, classifications, certificates, or ratings. Age recommendations, of either an advisory or restrictive capacity, are often applied in lieu of censorship; in some jurisdictions, movie theaters may have a legal obligation to enforce restrictive ratings.

In some countries such as Australia, Canada, and Singapore, an official government body decides on ratings; in other countries such as Denmark, Japan, and the United States, it is done by industry committees with little if any official government status. In most countries, however, films that are considered morally offensive have been censored, restricted, or banned. Even if the film rating system has no legal consequences, and a film has not explicitly been restricted or banned, there are usually laws forbidding certain films, or forbidding minors to view them. The influence of specific factors in deciding a rating varies from country to country.

Other factors may or may not influence the classification process, such as being set within a non-fictional historical context, whether the film glorifies violence or drug use, whether said violence or drug use is carried out by the protagonist, with whom the viewer should empathize, or by the antagonist. In Germany, for example, films depicting explicit war violence in a real war context (such as World War II) are handled more leniently than films with purely fictional settings.

A film may be produced with a particular rating in mind. It may be re-edited if the desired rating is not obtained, especially to avoid a higher rating than intended. A film may also be re-edited to produce a different version for other countries.

== Comparison table ==
A comparison of current film rating systems, showing age on the horizontal axis. Note however that the specific criteria used in assigning a classification can vary widely from one country to another. Therefore, the color codes and age ranges are not directly comparable from one country to another.

Key:

- White – No restrictions: Suitable for all ages / Aimed at young audiences / Exempt / Not rated.
- Yellow – Advisory: Parental guidance is suggested for designated age range.
- Purple – Strong advisory: Not recommended for a younger audience but not restricted.
- Red – Restrictive: Parental accompaniment required for younger audiences.
- Black – Prohibitive: Exclusively for older audiences / Restricted to licensed premises / Restricted to a specific audience / Banned.

Table guide
Country	Age rating																						Other
Country	0	1	2	3	4	5	6	7	8	9	10	11	12	13	14	15	16	17	18	19	20	21	Other
Example	G (suitable for all ages)													PG-13 (advised for ages 13 and over)					NC-17 (prohibited for under 18s)				Exempt
Example	PG (parental guidance)												12A (adult supervision mandated for under 12s)		18A (prohibited for under 14s)				18A (adult supervision mandated for under 18s)				Banned
Where the highlighting starts for a particular rating indicates the lower age threshold for which the film is suitable, and any associated restrictions. Some ratings have two components: for example, Canada's 18A rating requires audiences aged between 14 and 18 to be accompanied by an adult in some provinces. In such instances the rating is represented by two highlights to indicate the two restrictions.

Country	Age rating																						Other
Country	0	1	2	3	4	5	6	7	8	9	10	11	12	13	14	15	16	17	18	19	20	21	Other
Argentina	G													R-13				R-17	C				—
Argentina	SP													R-13				R-17	C				—
Australia	G															M			R 18+				Exempt
Australia	PG															MA 15+			X 18+				RC
Austria	Unrestricted						6+		8+		10+		12+		14+		16+						—
Bahamas	A															T			B				D
Bahamas	A															T			C				D
Barbados	GA													PG-13					R				—
Barbados	PG													PG-13					A				—
Belgium	AL/TOUS						6			9			12		14		16		18				—
Bhutan	U																		A				—
Bhutan	PG												PG						A				—
Brazil	L						6				10		12		14		16						—
Brazil	L						6				10		12		14		18		18				—
Bulgaria	A												C		C+		D+		X				?
Bulgaria	B												C		C+		D		X				N/A
Cambodia	G															NC15			R18				—
Canada (outside Québec)	G														14A				R				E
Canada (outside Québec)	G														14A				A				E
Canada (outside Québec)	PG														18A				18A				Prohibited
(Quebec)	G													13+			16+		18+				Exempt
(Quebec)	G													13+			16+		18+ (Explicit sexuality)				Refused classification
Chile	TE							TE+7							+14				+18				Educational
Chile	TE							TE+7							+14				Excessive violence				Educational
Chile	TE							TE+7							+14				Pornography				Educational
Colombia	T							7					12			15			18				Prohibited
Colombia	T							7					12			15			X				Prohibited
Cook Islands	G															MA			R18				—
Cook Islands	PG															MA			R18				—
Costa Rica	TP							TP7					TP12			M15			M18				Recommended
Costa Rica	TP							TP7					M12			M15			M18				Recommended
Denmark	A							7															F
Denmark	A							11				11											F
Denmark	A							15								15							F
Estonia	PERE						MS-6						MS-12		K-14		K-16		K-18				—
Estonia	L						MS-6						K-12		K-14		K-16		K-18				—
Fiji	G													PG					A				—
Fiji	G													Y					R				—
Finland	S/T				7			7		12			12	16			16		18				—
France	TP												12				16		18				Prohibited
France	TP												12				16		X				Prohibited
Germany	FSK 0						FSK 6										FSK 16		FSK 18				Educational
Germany	FSK 0						FSK 12						FSK 12				FSK 16		Unrated				Educational
Ghana	U												12			15			18				NS
Ghana	PG												12			15			18				NS
Greece	Unrestricted													13				17	18				—
Hong Kong	I																		III				Exempt
Hong Kong	II_{A}																		III				Exempt
Hong Kong	II_{B}																		III				Exempt
Hungary	KN						6						12				16		18				—
Hungary	KN						6						12				16		X				—
Iceland	L						6			9			12		14								—
Iceland	L						6			9			12		16		16						—
Iceland	L						6			9			12		18				18				—
India	U							UA 7+						UA 13+			UA 16+		A				S
Indonesia	SU													13+				17+				21+	—
Iraq	G													PG 13		PG 15			18+				—
Iraq	G													PG 13		15+			18TC				—
Ireland	—				G				PG				12A			15A	16		18				—
Ireland	—				G				PG				12			15	16		18				—
Italy	T						6+				10+		14+		14+		18+		18+				—
Jamaica	G													PG-13	T-16		T-16		A-18				—
Jamaica	PG													PG-13	T-16		T-16		A-18				—
Japan	G												PG12			R15+			R18+				—
Kazakhstan	6-						6+						12+		14+		16+		18+			21+	—
Kenya	GE										PG						16		18				Restricted/Banned
Kuwait	G												PG-12			PG-15			R-18				—
Kuwait	PG												PG-12			R-15			R-18				—
Latvia	U							7+					12+				16+		18+				—
Lebanon	G													PG13			PG16		18+				—
Lebanon	PG													PG13			PG16		18+				—
Lithuania	V							N-7									N-16		N-18				—
Lithuania	V							N-13						N-13			N-16		N-18				—
Luxembourg	EA / 0						6						16				16						—
Luxembourg	EA / 0						12						12				18		18				—
Macau	A													B					D				—
Macau	A													B					Pornography				—
Macau	A													C					C				—
Malaysia	U												P12	13			16		18				Banned
Maldives	G												12+			15+			18+				PU
Maldives	PG												12+			15+			18+R				PU
Malta	U												12A			15			18				Not fit for exhibition
Malta	PG												12			15			18				Not fit for exhibition
Mauritius	U												PG			15			18				Rejected
Mauritius	U												PG			15			18R				Rejected
Mexico	AA							—					B			B-15			C				—
Mexico	A												B			B-15			D				—
Nepal	U																A						S
Nepal	PG																A						S
Netherlands	AL						6			9			12		14		16						—
Netherlands	AL						6			9			12		14		18		18				—
New Zealand	G													RP13			M		RP18				Exempt
New Zealand	G													RP13			RP16		RP18				Exempt
New Zealand	PG													R13		R15	R16		R18				R
New Zealand	PG													R13		R15	R16		R18				Objectionable
Nigeria	G												12A			15			18				RE
Nigeria	PG												12			15			18				RE
Norway	A						6			12			12						18				Not approved
Norway	A						9			9			15			15			18				Not approved
Papua New Guinea	G																		MA				R
Papua New Guinea	PGR																		MA				RC
Philippines	G													PG			R-16		R-18				X
Philippines	G													R-13			R-16		R-18				X
Portugal	A			M/3			M/6						M/12		M/14		M/16		M/18				—
Portugal	A			M/3			M/6						M/12		M/14		M/16		M/18				—
Portugal	A			M/3			M/6						M/12		M/14		M/16		M/18-P				—
Qatar	G													PG-13		PG-15			18+				—
Qatar	PG													PG-13		15+			18+				—
Romania	AG												AP-12			N-15			IM-18				IC
Romania	AG												AP-12			N-15			IM-18-XXX				IC
Russia	0+						6+						12+				16+		18+				Refused classification
Saudi Arabia	G												PG12			PG15			R18				—
Saudi Arabia	PG												PG12			R15			R18				—
Singapore	G													PG13			NC16		M18			R21	Exempt
Singapore	PG													PG13			NC16		M18			R21	Refused classification
Slovakia	"Teddy bear's head"												12			15			18				—
Slovakia	U							7					12			15			18				—
South Africa	A							7–9PG			7–9PG			13			16		18				XX
South Africa	PG										10–12PG			10–12PG			16		X18				XX
South Korea	ALL												12			15				19			—
South Korea	ALL												12			15				Restricted			—
Spain	A							7					12				16		18				—
Spain	A							7					12				16		X				—
Sweden	Btl							7				15				15							—
Sweden	Btl							11				11											—
Switzerland	JIF 0				JIF 6		JIF 6		JIF 10		JIF 10		JIF 14		JIF 14		JIF 18		JIF 18				—
Switzerland	JIF 0				—		JIF 8		JIF 8		JIF 12		JIF 12		JIF 16		JIF 16						—
Taiwan	0+						6+						6+			15+			18+				—
Taiwan	0+						—						12+			15+			18+				—
Thailand	P													13		15			18		20		Banned
Thailand	G													13		15			18		20		Banned
Turkey	General Audience						6A				10A			13A			16+		18+				Educational purposes
Turkey	General Audience						6+				10+			13+			16+		18+				Refused classification
Ukraine	ДА												12				16		18				Denied
Ukraine	ЗА												12				16		18				Denied
United Arab Emirates	G													PG13		PG15			18+			21+	—
United Arab Emirates	PG													PG13		15+			18+			21+	—
United Kingdom	Uc				U				PG				12A			15			18				Exempt
United Kingdom	Uc				U				PG				12			15			R18				Unsuitable for classification
United States	G													PG-13				R	NC-17				Not rated
United States	PG													PG-13				R	NC-17				Not rated
Uruguay	ATP						AM 6			AM 9			AM 12			AM 15			AM 18				—
Uruguay	ATP						AM 6			AM 9			AM 12			AM 15			R 18				—
Venezuela (San Cristóbal and the Baruta municipalities)	AA												B				C		D				—
Venezuela (San Cristóbal and the Baruta municipalities)	A												B				C		D				—
(Maracaibo municipality)	—		A												B				C				—
Vietnam	P													K			T16		T18				C
Vietnam	P													T13			T16		T18				C
Country	0	1	2	3	4	5	6	7	8	9	10	11	12	13	14	15	16	17	18	19	20	21	Other

== Argentina ==
Through its Advisory Commission of Cinematographic Exhibition (Comisión Asesora de Exhibición Cinematográfica) the National Institute of Cinema and Audiovisual Arts (INCAA) issues ratings for films. In 2026, a new classification system was introduced:

Categories of the new Argentinian classification system
- G: General Audience: content suitable for people of all ages.
- SP: Suggested Parental Supervision: general content, with recommendation of adult accompaniment for young children.
- R-13: Restricted to minors under 13 years of age: contains material that may be inappropriate for minors under that age without parental or guardian supervision.
- R-17: Restricted to minors under 17 years of age: contains material that may be inappropriate for minors under that age without parental or guardian supervision.
- C: Only suitable for those over 18 years of age: exclusive to specially licensed venues.

== Australia ==
The Classification Board and Classification Review Board are government-funded organisations which classify all films that are released for public exhibition.

The Australian classifications
- Advisory categories
  - Check the Classification (CTC) - Message for unclassified films and computer games. The film or computer game has been assessed and approved for advertising. You should check the classification closer to the release date. Advertising relating to unclassified films and games must display the CTC message - this includes posters, trailers, internet posts, and any other type of advertising. Once the content is classified, the classification marking should replace the CTC marking on all advertising material.
  - General (G) – General. The content is very mild in impact. The G classification is suitable for everyone.
  - Parental Guidance (PG) – Parental guidance recommended. The content is mild in impact. It is not recommended for viewing or playing by persons under 15 without guidance from parents or guardians.
  - Mature (M) – Recommended for mature audiences. The content is moderate in impact. Children under 15 may legally access this material because it is an advisory category. However, M classified films and computer games may include classifiable elements such as violence and nudity of moderate impact that are not recommended for children under 15 years.
- Restricted categories
  - Mature Accompanied (MA 15+) – Not suitable for people under 15. Under 15s must be accompanied by a parent or adult guardian. The content is strong in impact.
  - Restricted (R 18+) – Restricted to 18 years and over. The content is high in impact. Despite this category being legally restricted, in Queensland the restriction is not applicable to persons under 2.
- Adult film categories
  - Restricted (X 18+) – Restricted to 18 years and over. This classification is a special and legally restricted category which contains only sexually explicit content. That is, material which shows actual sexual intercourse and other sexual activity between consenting adults. X 18+ films are only available for sale or hire in the Australian Capital Territory and the Northern Territory.
  - Refused Classification (RC) – Refused Classification. Banned from sale or hire in the country and cannot be legally imported. Films are rated RC if their content is very high in impact and exceeds the guidelines.

Films intended to inform, educate or instruct or concerned with sport, religion or music are exempt from classification provided they do not contain material that would result in an "M" rating or higher if submitted for classification.

== Austria ==
Motion pictures are rated by the Austrian Board of Media Classification (ABMC) for the Federal Ministry of Education, Arts and Culture (Bundesministerium für Unterricht, Kunst und Kultur). The recommendations made by the ABMC are generally not legally binding and there are nine sets of state laws on the cinema sector with different age provisions. The only exception is in the case of "16" rated films, since under Austrian law there is a legal age restriction on certain types of content i.e. discrimination, sexual abuse, glorification of violence etc. In addition to the ABMC's age recommendations, in the state of Vienna children under the age of 6 are only permitted to attend public film performances if they are accompanied.

The AMBC issues age recommendation from the following categories:

- Unrestricted – Released for all age groups.
- 6+ – Released for children from age 6.
- 8+ - Released for children from age 8.
- 10+ – Released for children from age 10.
- 12+ – Released for children from age 12.
- 14+ – Released for children from age 14.
- 16+ – Released for children from age 16. Restricted classification.

== Bahamas ==
The Bahamas Plays and Films Control Board classifies films in the Bahamas. Upon completion of the examination the Board will classify the film in accordance with the following ratings:

- A - Suitable for all ages.
- B - Suitable for adults; persons under the age of 18 must be accompanied by a parent or responsible adult.
- T - Suitable for persons 15 and over, persons under 15 years are not admitted whether accompanied by an adult or not.
- C - Suitable for adults only, persons under 18 years are not admitted whether accompanied by an adult or not.
- D - Unsuitable for public viewing.

== Barbados ==
In Barbados, films are classified by the Film Censorship Board (FCB):

- GA – General Audience; Suitable for all ages.
- PG – Parental Guidance.
- PG13 – Parental Guidance 13; suitable for 13 years and older.
- R – Suitable for 18 years and older.
- A – Adult Only; No-one under 18 admitted.

== Belgium ==
On 8 January 2020, Belgium adopted the Dutch Kijkwijzer classification system. Belgium had previously used a basic two-tier system, in place since 1 September 1920. Until January 2020, classifications for films publicly exhibited in Belgium were issued by the Inter-Community Commission for Film Rating (Dutch: Intergemeenschapscommissie voor de Filmkeuring; French: Commission Intercommunautaire de Contrôle des Films). Films were prohibited to minors under the age of 16 unless passed by the commission. There is no mandatory rating system for video formats but 90% of video distribution abides by the voluntary Belgium Video Federation. It was basically the same as the system for theatrical exhibition, but also provided a "12" rating. Under Kijkwijzer, the distributor fills out a questionnaire about the content of the film and an age category is automatically assigned. The new system is fully advisory, and carries no mandatory restrictions. In the French and German-speaking communities, the system is known as Cinecheck.

The rating labels and content descriptors used in Belgium for feature films

The age categories are as follows:

- AL/TOUS: All ages.
- 6: From 6 years.
- 9: From 9 years.
- 12: From 12 years.
- 14: From 14 years.
- 16: From 16 years.
- 18: From 18 years.

== Bhutan ==
In Bhutan, film classification is administered by the Bhutan InfoComm and Media Authority (BICMA) under Chapter 12, Section 250 of the Information, Communications and Media Act of Bhutan 2018. Feature films are evaluated by a five-member examining panel drawn from the National Film Review Board. The examining panel assesses films based on local sensitivities, prevailing social and cultural standards, and their overall impact on society, taking into account depictions of violence, sex, nudity, and substance abuse. While the framework applies to all public theatrical releases, imported foreign films that already hold certificates from recognized external classification bodies may be exempted from a full review at BICMA's discretion.

Following evaluation, films are certified under one of three categories:

- U: Suitable for unrestricted public exhibition.
- U (PG): Suitable for unrestricted public exhibition, but parental guidance is suggested as certain scenes may not be suitable for children. While such films should not disturb children aged around 12 years or older, parents should consider whether the content might upset younger or more sensitive children.
- A: Restricted to viewers aged 18 years and over.

== Brazil ==
All films that are exhibited in public or released on a home video format in Brazil must be submitted for classification to the advisory rating (Classificação Indicativa, abbreviated ClassInd), which is run by the Brazilian Ministry of Justice (Ministério da Justiça). Under 10s must always be accompanied by an adult guardian, even for films rated L. Anyone below the film's minimum age can watch it if accompanied or allowed by the parent or guardian who is at least 18 years old, except for those rated 18, which can only be allowed for teenagers aged 16+. Unlike many countries, the ClassInd does not have any legal right to ban, demand cuts or refuse to rate any film.

In 2025, a new rating was introduced, which set at an age threshold of 6-years-old.

Film classification symbols used in Brazil

The ClassInd uses the following system:

- L: Livre (General)
- 6: Não recomendado para menores de seis anos (Not recommended for minors under 6)
- 10: Não recomendado para menores de 10 anos (Not recommended for minors under 10)
- 12: Não recomendado para menores de 12 anos (Not recommended for minors under 12)
- 14: Não recomendado para menores de 14 anos (Not recommended for minors under 14)
- 16: Não recomendado para menores de 16 anos (Not recommended for minors under 16)
- 18: Não recomendado para menores de 18 anos (Not recommended for minors under 18)

There are also operational descriptions of attenuating and aggravating elements that can interfere on the final rating.

== Bulgaria ==
The Bulgarian film rating system is defined in the Film Industry Act of 2003 and administered by the National Film Rating Committee. Since then, two more restrictive ratings (C+ and D+) have been added to the system:

- A – Recommended for children.
- B – No age restrictions.
- C – Not recommended for children under 12. No persons under 12 shall be admitted unless accompanied by an adult.
- C+ – Not recommended for children under 14. No persons under 14 shall be admitted unless accompanied by an adult.
- D+ – Not recommended for children under 16. No persons under 16 shall be admitted unless accompanied by an adult.
- D – Prohibited for persons under 16.
- X – Prohibited for persons under 18, for licensed venues only.

== Cambodia ==
In Cambodia, the Department of Movies and Promotion of Culture at the Ministry of Culture and Fine Arts (MCFA) classifies films for exhibition in cinemas and on home media under the following age categories:

- G – General audience.
- NC15 – Permitted for viewers aged 15 and over.
- R18 – Permitted for viewers aged 18 and over (only permitted to be shown in cinemas)

== Canada ==
Film ratings in Canada are a provincial responsibility, and each province has its own legislation, rules and regulations regarding rating, exhibition and admission. Ratings are required for theatrical exhibition, but not all provinces require classification for home video. In the past there was a wide range of rating categories and practices in the various provinces; however, the seven rating systems—with the exception of Quebec—now all use categories and logos derived from the Canadian Home Video Rating System (CHVRS).

=== Classifications used outside Quebec ===
Canadian cinema ratings used outside Quebec

Canadian home video ratings used outside Quebec.

The categories are mostly identical to the CHVRS with a few minor variations. In the provinces that require classification of video formats, supply of 14A and 18A films is restricted to customers above those ages. In the case of theatre exhibition, children are admitted to 14A if accompanied by an adult. In British Columbia, Saskatchewan (administered by the British Columbia Film Classification Office), Alberta and Ontario children are also admitted to 18A films if accompanied. However, children under the age of 14 are prohibited to view 18A films in the Manitoba and Maritime provinces even if accompanied by an adult. The Maritimes and British Columbia (along with Saskatchewan) also provide an "A" classification for adult content. Some provinces, such as Nova Scotia, reserve the right to prohibit films altogether.

In general, the categories are:

- G – Suitable for viewing by all ages.
- PG – Parental guidance advised.
  - Not Recommended For Young Children – The film may be inappropriate for young children. "Young Children" would be persons age 8 and under.
- 14A – Suitable for people 14 years of age or older. Those under 14 should view with an adult. No rental or purchase by those under 14. Parents cautioned. (Formerly "Adult Accompaniment (14)" in the Maritimes)
  - Not Recommended For Children – "Children" would be persons age 13 and under. Films with this advisory may include scenes that reflect a more mature situation, such as drug use or abuse.
- 18A – Suitable for people 18 years of age or older. Those under 18 should view with an adult. Additionally, in certain provinces there is a mandatory age restriction of 14 years. No rental or purchase by those under 18. Parents strongly cautioned.
- R – Restricted to 18 years and over. No rental or purchase by those under 18. Content not suitable for minors.
- A – Adult. Film is not suitable for viewers under 18 years of age. (Formerly "Explicit Material (XXX)" in the Maritimes)
- E – Exempt.

=== Classifications used in Quebec ===
The ratings used in Quebec

In Quebec, the provincial Ministry of Culture and Communications (and until 2017 the Régie du cinéma) rates all films and videos; its purview devolves from the Cinema Act (chapter C-18.1). In some cases the Ministry may refuse to provide a classification, effectively banning the film. Educational and sports films are exempt from classification.

- G: Visa général (General Rating) – May be viewed, rented or purchased by persons of all ages. If a film carrying a "G" rating might offend the sensibilities of a child under 8 years of age, "Not suitable for young children" is appended to the classification.
- 13+: 13 ans et plus (13 years and over) – May be viewed, rented or purchased only by persons 13 years of age or over. Children under 13 may be admitted only if accompanied by an adult.
- 16+: 16 ans et plus (16 years and over) – May be viewed, rented or purchased only by persons 16 years of age or over.
- 18+: 18 ans et plus (18 years and over) – May be viewed, rented or purchased only by persons 18 years of age or over. If a film contains real and explicit sexual activity, "Explicit sexuality" is appended to the classification, and in the retail video industry, storeowners are required to place the film in a room reserved for adults.

== Chile ==
Films are classified by the Council of Cinematographic Classification (Consejo de Calificación Cinematográfica) which is a central agency under the Ministry of Education. In 2002, legislation was enacted which reversed the ban on all 1,090 films that had previously been banned in Chile.

The current age ratings (enacted in 2002) are:

- Todo Espectador – All spectators.
  - Inconveniente para menores de 7 años – Not recommended for children younger than 7 years of age. (Only applied on TE)
- Mayores de 14 años – 14 years old and over.
- Mayores de 18 años – 18 years old and over.
  - Contenido pornográfico – Pornographic content.
  - Contenido excesivamente violento – Excessively violent content.
- Contenido educativo – Educational content.

Minors are allowed to watch cinematographic productions rated in an immediately higher category than their age if accompanied by any of their parents, guardians, or their teachers within the framework of their educational activities. This rule does not apply to films with pornographic or excessively violent content. Furthermore, films with pornographic content may only be exhibited at venues licensed for that purpose.

== Colombia ==
In 2005, the Ministry of Culture issued its new rating system. The classifications are:

- T: For general audiences.
- 7: Advisory.
- 12: Advisory.
- 15: Restricted.
- 18: Restricted.
- X: Pornographic content.
- Prohibited: Contains elements that incite or advocate crime.

== Cook Islands ==
In the Cook Islands, publications such as films, TV shows and video games are classified by the Cook Islands Censorship Office in accordance with the Film and Censorship Act 1985. The following four classifications are used:

- G (general)
- PG (parental guidance)
- MA (mature audiences)
- R18 (restricted to adults)

The Censorship Office does not define the age for a "mature audience", but its television code—which uses the same ratings—defines a child as "under 15 years".

== Costa Rica ==
In Costa Rica, films are classified by the Ministry of Justice and Peace:

- TP (Todo Público): All public
- TP7 (Todo público, advertencia personas menores de 7 años acompañadas de una persona adulta): All public (parental guidance is recommended for children under 7)
- TP12 (Todo público, personas con edad inferior a 12 años, acompañadas de una persona adulta): All public (children under 12 must be accompanied by an adult)
- M12 (Mayores de 12 años): Over 12 years old
- M15 (Mayores de 15 años): Over 15 years old
- M18 (Mayores de 18 años): Over 18 years old
- Material Cinematográfico recomendado (Recommended cinematographic material): Films and documentaries that, due to their content and various themes they present, are recommended for their cultural value.

== Denmark ==
In Denmark, the Media Council for Children and Young People currently rates films. Films do not have to be submitted for a rating and in such instances must be labelled a "15" (restricted to people aged 15 and above). Children aged 7 and above may attend any performance—including those restricted to older audiences—if they are accompanied by an adult.

The Danish ratings
- A – Suitable for a general audience.
- 7 – Not recommended for children under 7.
- 11 – For ages 11 and up.
- 15 – For ages 15 and up.
- F – Exempt from classification.

== Estonia ==
Film classification in Estonia is regulated by the Child Welfare Act.

- PERE – Family Film.
- L – Allowed to all.
- MS-6 – Not recommended for under 6.
- MS-12 – Not recommended for under 12.
- K-12 – Prohibited for under 12 unless accompanied by an adult.
- K-14 – Prohibited for under 14 unless accompanied by an adult.
- K-16 – Prohibited for under 16 unless accompanied by an adult.
- K-18 – Prohibited for under 18 unless accompanied by an adult.

== Fiji ==
In Fiji, films are classified by the Fijian Censors Board. In 2019 the ratings system was overhauled, resulting in four categories. There is a classification for general exhibition and two age-restrictive categories: 13 and an "adult" category. There is also a "restricted public exhibition" category that imposes special conditions. In 2025, the Cinematographic Film Amendment Bill updated the classification system; it re-introduced the PG rating (which had been abolished in 2019) and re-defined the "adult" classification to denote a person aged 18 and over (up from 16). The classifications are:

- G – approved for general exhibition;
- PG – approved for exhibition to a person below the age of 13 years with an adult, parent or guardian present;
- Y – approved for exhibition to viewers of the age of 13 and over;
- A – approved for exhibition to adults only (18 and over);
- R – approved for restricted public exhibition subject to conditions imposed by the censor.

== Finland ==
The age ratings and content descriptors used in Finland

Films in Finland are classified by the National Audiovisual Institute. A minor up to 3 years younger than the age limit is permitted to see a film in a cinema when accompanied by an adult, except for 18-rated films. Films with an age rating may contain an additional marker for violence, sex, fear, or substance abuse. The ratings are as follows:

- S (Finnish) or T (Swedish) – For all ages.
- 7 – For 7 years and over.
- 12 – For 12 years and over.
- 16 – For 16 years and over.
- 18 – Prohibited for children under 18 years of age.

== France ==
Prior to showing in theatres, a distribution certificate must be obtained from the Ministry of Culture. The Minister will decide which certificate to issue based on a recommendation by the classification of the Centre national du cinéma et de l'image animée (CNC). In some cases, films may be classified as "pornographic films or those containing an incitement to violence" or completely prohibited from screening.

Categories of the French film age rating classification system

A certificate will be granted from the following:

- TP (Tous publics) – Certificate authorising the screening of the film to all members of the public.
- -12 – Certificate prohibiting the screening of the film to minors under 12.
- -16 – Certificate prohibiting the screening of the film to minors under 16.
- -18 – Certificate prohibiting the screening of the film to minors under 18.
- X – Certificate for pornographic or violence-inciting movies. They cannot be screened to minors under 18, are heavily taxed and cannot receive any subvention. The last X-rating occurred in 1996 and the last adult cinema closed in 2019.
- Interdiction totale (prohibition) – Certificate totally prohibiting the screening of the film. No film has been refused a certificate since 1979.

== Germany ==
In Germany, films are classified under the Freiwillige Selbstkontrolle der Filmwirtschaft (Voluntary Self-Regulation of the Film Industry, FSK). All the ratings contain the phrase "gemäß §14 JuSchG" (in accordance with §14 of the Youth Protection Law), signifying that they are legally binding for minors. Cinemas may legally exhibit films without a classification but minors are prohibited from such screenings.

The German motion picture classifications
- Ohne Altersbeschränkung (FSK 0): for everyone (white sign).
- Freigegeben ab 6 Jahren (FSK 6): for ages 6 and older (yellow sign).
- Freigegeben ab 12 Jahren (FSK 12): for ages 12 and older; children who are at least age 6 may be admitted with adult accompaniment (green sign).
- Freigegeben ab 16 Jahren (FSK 16): for ages 16 and older, nobody under this age admitted (blue sign).
- Keine Jugendfreigabe (FSK 18): "no youth admitted", adults only. (red sign).
- Infoprogramm or Lehrprogramm: "educational programming". This rating is not issued by the FSK, but may be self-applied to films seeking to educate their audience (e.g. documentaries, instructional films, etc.). Films with this rating may be sold without any age restriction provided they do not contain any material "evidently harmful to the development of children and youths".

The FSK rating also governs regulations regarding the timeslot a film may be aired on a television station. Films rated FSK 18 can only be broadcast between 11:00 pm and 6:00 am, while those rated FSK 16 can only air between 10:00 pm and 6:00 am; films rated FSK 12 may be aired at any time, though broadcasters must give due consideration to younger children's well-being when deciding on the timeslot. Public broadcasters are free to make exceptions at their own discretion, whereas private broadcasters must submit a request to make exceptions.

== Ghana ==
In Ghana, films are classified by the Film Classification Committee.

Categories of the Ghana classification system
- U - Universal for all categories of persons.
- PG - Viewers below twelve are to watch under Parental Guidance.
- 12 - For persons of twelve years and above. Children under this age must be accompanied.
- 15 - For persons of fifteen years and above only.
- 18 - For persons of eighteen years and above only.
- NS - Not suitable for public exhibition.

== Greece ==
All publicly released films must be submitted to the Youth Committee for classification. There are four categories:

- Unrestricted – No restrictions (The film does not contain violence, drug abuse, or sexual content).
- 13 – The film may contain mild violence and adult themes. Suitable for people aged 13 and above.
- 17 – The film may contain violence, drug abuse, and softcore pornographic scenes. An ID card certifying the age is required in all Greek cinemas and video rental shops in order to get a cinema ticket or rent a video of a "17" rated film. Not permitted to young people under the age of 17.
- 18 – Not permitted to people under the age of 18.

== Hong Kong ==
Films intended for public exhibition have to be submitted to the Director of Film, Newspaper and Article Administration, who is the Film Censorship Authority (FCA) under the Ordinance, for approval. Films approved for public exhibition are then either classified or exempted from classification.

Hong Kong ratings administered by the Film Censorship Authority
- I – Suitable for all ages. (circle sign).
- II_{A} – Not suitable for children. (square sign).
- II_{B} – Not suitable for young persons and children.
- III – Persons aged 18 or above only. (triangle sign).

Of the four levels, Categories I, II_{A}, and II_{B} are unrestricted. Only Category III is a restricted category and regulated by the government.

== Hungary ==
The Hungarian ratings administered by the National Media and Infocommunications Authority

Hungarian ratings are decided by the National Media and Infocommunications Authority (NMHH):

- KN (korhatár nélkül) – All audiences.
- 6 – Not recommended below age of 6.
- 12 – Not recommended below age of 12.
- 16 – Not recommended below age of 16.
- 18 – Not recommended below age of 18.
- X – Restricted below 18, for adults only. Excessively violent scenes.

All ratings are advisory except the "X" classification. The current one is the third motion picture rating system in Hungary. The first system existed between 1965 and 2004, and was administered by the Ministry for National Cultural Heritage and its predecessors. Its categories were "Without age restriction", "Not recommended below age of 14", "Above age of 16 only", and "Above age of 18 only". A second system was introduced in 2004 which was overhauled in 2011 in favour of the current system. Its categories—given by the National Film Office—were "Without age restriction", "Parental guidance suggested below age of 12", "Not recommended below age of 16", "Not recommended below age of 18", and "For adults only".

== Iceland ==
Since 1 July 2006, FRÍSK (short for Félag rétthafa í sjónvarps- og kvikmyndaiðnaði) has replaced the Kvikmyndaskoðun system in Iceland. In October 2013, FRÍSK announced that it was adopting a new system similar to the Netherlands' Kijkwijzer at least through 2016. The Icelandic ratings system also provides an "18" rating in addition to the Kijkwijzer ratings. Under Icelandic law, minors aged 14-years-old and over may be admitted to a film carrying a higher age rating if accompanied by an adult. The ratings are as follows:

The ratings and descriptors used in Iceland since 2017
- L: All ages.
- 6: Not suitable for children under 6 years.
- 9: Not suitable for children under 9 years.
- 12: Not suitable for children under 12 years.
- 14: Not suitable for children under 14 years.
- 16: Not suitable for children under 16 years.
- 18: Not suitable for children under 18 years.

== India ==
The Indian ratings administered by the Central Board of Film Certification

In India, Central Board of Film Certification (CBFC) is responsible for certifying films meant for public exhibition.

- U – Unrestricted public exhibition.
- UA – Unrestricted public exhibition, but with mandatory age-restricted parental guidance. The age threshold was previously set at 12 years of age, but in 2023 this was further refined to 7, 13 and 16 years of age.
  - UA 7+ – Unrestricted public exhibition, but with parental guidance for children below the age of 7 years.
  - UA 13+ – Unrestricted public exhibition, but with parental guidance for children below the age of 13 years.
  - UA 16+ – Unrestricted public exhibition, but with parental guidance for children below the age of 16 years.
- A – Restricted to adults.
- S – Restricted to any special class of persons.

== Indonesia ==
The Indonesian ratings administered by the Film Censorship Board (LSF)

Motion pictures shown in Indonesia must undergo reviewing by the Film Censorship Board (LSF). Other than issuing certificates, the LSF also reviews and issues permits for film-related advertising, such as movie trailers and posters. Since the late 2000s, LSF has no authority to cut scenes from films, but it may suggest cuts to distributors in order for it to issue certificates in a certain rating. Films passed for exhibition are awarded one of the following classifications:

- SU (Semua Umur): All ages.
- 13+: Suitable for ages 13 and above.
- 17+: Suitable for ages 17 and above.
- 21+: Suitable for ages 21 and above.

== Iraq ==
The Iraqi film rating system is declared by the Ministry of Information and Culture. It is against the law for an underage person to enter restricted films at the cinemas, even with their parents, where a proof of identity may be required.

- G: General Exhibition - open for all ages.
- PG 13: Customer may be aged 13 years and under, but must be accompanied by someone 13 years old or older. Please note content may not be appropriate for 13 years and below, booking to be at the discretion of guardians and parents.
- PG 15: Customer may be aged 15 years and under, but must be accompanied by someone 15 years old or older. Please note content may not be appropriate for 15 years and below, booking to be at the discretion of guardians and parents.
- 15+: No persons under 15 years of age will be admitted. Babies not allowed.
- 18+: No persons under 18 years of age will be admitted. Babies not allowed.
- 18TC: Rated 18+ until confirmed by the National Media Council. Entry to the cinema must comply with the age restriction of final confirmed rating. Booking prior to confirmed rating is at customers discretion.

== Ireland ==
All films that are exhibited in public or released on a home video format must be submitted for classification to the Irish Film Classification Office (IFCO).

Cinema ratings

Video ratings
- G (General) – Suitable for children of school going age (note: children can be enrolled in school from the age of 4).
- PG (Parental Guidance) – Suitable for children over the age of 8. Parental guidance is recommended for children under the age of 12.
- 12A, 12 – Suitable for viewers of 12 and over. Younger children may be admitted to the film at cinemas if accompanied by an adult; on home video younger viewers are not permitted to purchase/rent the video.
- 15A, 15 – Suitable for viewers of 15 and over. Younger viewers may be admitted to the film at cinemas if accompanied by an adult; on home video younger viewers are not permitted to purchase/rent the video.
- 16 (cinema only) – Suitable for viewers of 16 and over. Younger viewers are not admitted.
- 18 – Suitable only for adults. Viewers under 18 are not admitted at cinemas or permitted to purchase/rent the video.

== Italy ==
In Italy the rating system of the films is currently disciplined by the Decreto legislativo n° 203 of 7 December 2017. For commercial release, distributors are requested to classify their films based on the age of the audience. Their decision is verified by a commission of the Ministry of Culture, composed of members of the film industry and experts in education and animal rights. Since 2021, the commission is no longer allowed to ban a film or demand edits. Films are classified into one of the following categories:

The age ratings used in Italy

The content descriptors used in Italy
- T (film per tutti): no age restriction.
- 6+ (non adatto ai minori di anni 6): not suitable for children under 6.
- 10+ (non adatto ai minori di anni 10): not suitable for children under 10.
- 14+ (vietato ai minori di 14 anni): released to ages 14 and older; children who are at least 12 may be admitted with adult accompaniment.
- 18+ (vietato ai minori di 18 anni): released to ages 18 and older; children who are at least 16 may be admitted with adult accompaniment.

The classification only applies to commercial releases in theaters, and the law does not require classification of home media. Before 2021, films aimed to be shown in theatres were classified for all ages (T) or prohibited for children under 14 or 18 by the Commission for Film Review. The commission could also ask for some scenes to be cut or ban the distribution of the film. The 6+ classification was introduced in 2021, while the 10+ classification was adopted in 2025.

== Jamaica ==
Film classification in Jamaica is a requirement of the Cinematograph Act of 1913, which also established the Cinematograph Authority.

- G (General Audiences): Appropriate for all ages.
- PG (only applied occasionally).
- PG-13: Children 12 years and under must be accompanied by parent/guardian.
- T-16: Teenagers 14 & 15 will be admitted in the company of an adult.
- A-18: No one under the age of 18 years will be admitted.

== Japan ==
A Japanese film rating regulator known as Eirin (映倫) [full-name: Eiga Rinri Kanri Iinkai (映画倫理管理委員会), or Film Ethics Management Committee] has a film classification system under which films are classified into one of four categories. The categories have been in use since 1 May 1998.

Eirin ratings
- G: General, suitable for all ages.
- PG12: Parental guidance requested for young people under 12 years.
- R15+: No one under 15 admitted.
- R18+: No one under 18 admitted.

== Kazakhstan ==
In Kazakhstan, films are rated by the Committee for Culture of the Ministry for Culture and Information.

- 6-: 6 жасқа толмаған балаларға арналған фильмдер. Suitable for children under the age of 6.
- 6+: 6 жасқа толған балаларға арналған фильмдер. Suitable for children over the age of 6.
- 12+: 12 жасқа толған балаларға арналған фильмдер. Suitable for children over the age of 12.
- 14+: 14 жасқа толған балаларға арналған фильмдер. Supervision by parents recommended for children under the age of 14.
- 16+: 16 жасқа толған адамдарға арналған фильмдер. Supervision by parents recommended for children under the age of 16.
- 18+: 18 жасқа толған адамдарға арналған фильмдер. For viewers aged over 18.
- 21+: 21 жасқа толған адамдарға арналған фильмдер. For viewers aged over 21. Restricted to licensed venues between 10 pm and 6 am local time.

== Kenya ==
In Kenya, films are rated by the Kenya Film Classification Board.

- GE (General Exhibition) – Suitable for all ages.
- PG (Parental Guidance Recommended) – May contain scenes unsuitable for children under the age of 10. While the content may be suitable for children, parents are advised to monitor the content.
- 16 (Unsuitable for persons under age of 16) – Restricted to persons aged 16 years and above.
- 18 (Adults Only) – Restricted to persons aged 18 years and above.
- Restricted/Banned

== Kuwait ==
In Kuwait, films are rated by the Censor Board Committee (لجنة الرقابة) under authority of the Ministry of Information (وزارة الإعلام). The Committee may sanction edits of or outright ban certain films in order to comply with cultural laws and values of Kuwait. The Ministry of Information originally established an age classifications system for films under decision number #73, article #10 of year 2012.

The classification system has undergone periodic revisions since 2012. The latest incarnation was introduced in 2025 and comprises six ratings:

- G – Suitable for all ages
- PG – Parental guidance is advised
- PG-12 – Adults must accompany children under 12 years old
- PG-15 – Adults must accompany children under 15 years old
- R-15 – Only for ages 15 and above
- R-18 – Only for ages 18 and above

== Latvia ==
In Latvia, it is the duty of the producer of a film or distributor to assign a rating according to a pre-determined set of criteria. All publicly exhibited films, visual recordings and films broadcast over television and electronic networks must be classified.

- U (universal audience) – Suitable for persons of all age groups.
- 7+: Suitable for a person who has reached at least 7 years of age.
- 12+: Suitable for a person who has reached at least 12 years of age.
- 16+: Suitable for a person who has reached at least 16 years of age.
- 18+: Not suitable for a minor (prohibited to people under 18).

== Lebanon ==
Films released in Lebanon are rated by the Lebanese Censorship Board.

- G: Intended for General Audiences. All ages are admitted.
- PG: Parental Guidance is suggested.
- PG13: Children under 13 years of age will not be admitted.
- PG16: Persons under 16 years of age will not be admitted.
- 18+: Persons under 18 years of age will not be admitted.

== Lithuania ==
The Lithuanian Film Centre is a state institution under the Ministry of Culture of Lithuania. A film approved for public exhibition receives one of the ratings below based on its content:

- V: Released for all ages. The full name for the classification is visi, meaning "all"
- N-7: Released from age 7 and above. Children aged under 7 may be admitted with adult supervision.
- N-13: Released from age 13 and above. Children aged between 7 and 12 may be admitted with adult supervision.
- N-16: Released from age 16 and above. No one under 16 is admitted.
- N-18: Released from age 18 and above. No one under 18 is admitted.

== Luxembourg ==
In Luxembourg, film age classifications are overseen by the Independent Luxembourg Audiovisual Authority (Autorité indépendante audiovisuelle luxembourgeoise; ALIA), which maintains the national database of rated theatrical releases. The theatrical rating system consists of five age categories:

- 0 / EA (Tous publics / Enfants Admis) – Accessible to all audiences with no age restrictions.
- 6 – Suitable for ages 6 and above.
- 12 – Suitable for ages 12 and above.
- 16 – Suitable for ages 16 and above.
- 18 – Suitable for ages 18 and above.

Children aged 6 and above may watch a film classified in the next higher age category if accompanied by a parent or legal guardian. If the film is rated more than one category above the child’s age, access remains prohibited.

== Macau ==
In Macau, public film screenings and performances are classified by the Assessment Committee of Performing Arts (Chinese: 公開映、演甄審委員會; Portuguese: Comissão de Classificação de Espectáculos) under Decree-Law No. 15/78/M. The committee operates under the Cultural Affairs Bureau (IC) of the Macao SAR Government and is responsible for providing advice on the age classification and audience admission of public performances, film screenings, and public entertainment prior to their exhibition.

Films are classified into four categories:

- A: Suitable for all ages.
- B: Not suitable for audiences under the age of 13.
- C: Not suitable for audiences under the age of 18, and prohibited for audiences under the age of 13.
- D: Prohibited for audiences under the age of 18.

Pornography: Pornographic films are prohibited for audiences aged under 18 and are regulated separately under Law No. 10/78/M, which establishes a distinct legal framework governing the public exhibition of pornographic and obscene materials.

== Malaysia ==
Historically, film censorship in Malaysia was carried out by police under the Theatre Ordinance 1908. In 1954 the Film Censorship Board (LPF) was created to censor films distributed across Malaysia in accordance with the Cinematograph Films Act 1952, and later the Film Censorship Act 2002. Malaysia's motion picture rating system was introduced in 1953, initially classifying films either for General Audiences (Tontonan Umum) or For Adults Only (Untuk Orang Dewasa Sahaja), and in 1996 these classifications were changed to "U" and four different "18" categories (which were amalgamated back into a single classification in 2010). In 2008, the "PG13" classification was introduced, which admitted children under the age of 13 if accompanied by an adult ("PG13" underwent a cosmetic change to "P13" in 2012). In February 2023, the "P13" classification was split in two—a "P12" classification (effectively the same as "P13" but with a slightly lower age threshold) and a prohibitive "13" classification, which bars admission to children under the age of 13. A prohibitive "16" classification was also introduced, barring audiences under the age of 16.

The new film classification logos introduced since February 2023

Upon viewing the board will assign one of three categories to the film:

- Lulus Bersih (Passed Clean [i.e. without cuts])
- Lulus Dengan Pengubahan (Passed with Edits/Cuts)
- Tidak Diluluskan Untuk Tayangan (Not Approved for Screening)

Should a film be approved, the Board then assigns the film a classification. As of 2023 the ratings are:

- U (Umum) - Suitable for all ages.
- P12 (Penjaga) – Parental guidance required for audiences under the age of 12.
- 13 – For audiences aged 13 years old and above.
- 16 – For audiences aged 16 years old and above.
- 18 – For audiences aged 18 years old and above.

== Maldives ==
Film in the Maldives are classified by the National Bureau of Classification. Certificates issued are based on the following categories:

Maldive film classifications
- G – Suitable for all ages.
- PG – Parental guidance.
- 12+ – For ages 12 and above.
- 15+ – Suitable for ages 15 and above.
- 18+ – Suitable for ages 18 and above.
- 18+R – Suitable for ages 18 and above. Restricted.
- PU – For professional use only.

== Malta ==
As of 2012, films in Malta are classified by the Film Board in accordance with the Malta Council for Culture and the Arts Act. As part of an overhaul in 2013 the "14" and "16" age classifications were replaced by "12A" and "15"; the "PG" rating was redefined while "U", "12" and "18" were retained in their existing form.

If the film is deemed "fit for exhibition" it will be awarded one of the following classifications:

- U (Universal) – Suitable for all.
- PG (Parental Guidance) – General viewing, but some scenes may be unsuitable for young children.
- 12A – Suitable for persons of 12 years and over: Provided that persons younger than 12 years may attend only when accompanied by an adult.
- 12 – Suitable only for persons of 12 years and over.
- 15 – Suitable only for persons of 15 years and over.
- 18 – Suitable only for persons of 18 years and over.

== Mauritius ==
The Film Classification Board (FCB) classifies films and stage plays on behalf of the Ministry of Arts and Cultural Heritage. Film will be awarded one of the following classifications in accordance with the Film Act 2002 or rejected.

- U (Universal) – Suitable for all audiences.
- PG – Parental Guidance is compulsory for children under the age of 12.
- 15 – Suitable for persons of the age of 15 and above.
- 18 – Suitable for all Adults.
- 18R – Adult audiences only (subject to specified conditions)
- Rejected – Not allowed.

== Mexico ==
Mexican age Ratings

The General Directorate of Radio, Television and Cinematography (in Spanish, Dirección General de Radio, Televisión y Cinematografía) is the issuer of ratings for motion pictures. The RTC is an agency of the Secretariat of the Interior (Secretaría de Gobernación). It has its own classification system, as follows:

- AA - Informative-only rating: Understandable for children under 7 years.
- A - Information-only rating: For all age groups.
- B - Information-only rating: For adolescents 12 years and older.
- B-15 - Information-only rating: Not recommended for children under 15.
- C - Restrictive rating: For adults 18 and older.
- D - Restrictive rating: Adult movies (legally prohibited to those under 18 years of age).

== Nepal ==
In Nepal, films are reviewed and certified by the Central Film Examination Committee (Nepali: केन्द्रीय चलचित्र जाँच समिति), formerly known in English as the Central Film Censorship Committee (Film Censor Board), under the Film Examination and Classification Procedure, 2082 (2025). The committee evaluates films based on their subject matter, dialogue, scenes, and their potential impact on the mental health of children and adolescents, taking into account depictions of violence, sex, nudity, narcotic substances, language, the context and purpose of the story, and its overall theme.

Films are classified into four categories:

- U (Universal): Suitable for all audiences. Films in this category may be watched by children either alone or with their families.
- PG (Parental Guidance): Parental guidance is recommended for viewers under the age of 16. These films may have an adverse psychological impact on viewers under 16 if viewed without parental guidance.
- A (Adult): Restricted to viewers aged 16 and older.
- S: Reserved for films intended only for specified audiences or for exhibition in limited venues due to their highly specialized or sensitive subject matter, visuals, or dialogue.

== Netherlands ==
In the Netherlands, the Kijkwijzer system is used, which is executed by the Netherlands Institute for the Classification of Audiovisual Media (NICAM). Kijkwijzer is an advisory system for parents, but Dutch law also has a legal provision for public spaces, including cinemas. Children under the specified age limits are only admitted to films carrying an age limit of 6, 9, 12, or 14 if accompanied by an adult. In the case of "16" and "18" rated films, admission is legally prohibited for children under 16 years of age in both categories (a person aged 16 or 17 may rent, see or be admitted to "18" rated films) per section 240a of the Dutch Criminal Code.

The Kijkwijzer ratings used in the Netherlands since January 2020
- AL: All ages.
- 6: Potentially harmful to children under 6 years.
- 9: Potentially harmful to children under 9 years.
- 12: Potentially harmful to children under 12 years.
- 14: Potentially harmful to children under 14 years.
- 16: Potentially harmful to children under 16 years.
- 18: Potentially harmful to children under 18 years.

There are also seven descriptor icons used:

- Violence (Geweld)
- Fear (Angst)
- Sexual Content (Seks)
- Discrimination (Discriminatie)
- Drug and/or Alcohol abuse (Drugs- en/of alcoholmisbruik)
- Bad Language (Grof taalgebruik)
- Dangerous Challenges and Stunts (Gevaarlijk gedrag)

Mostly, these icons are used along with other symbols, displaying if a film contains violence, sexual content, frightening scenes, drug or alcohol abuse, discrimination, coarse language or dangerous challenges and stunts. These symbols are also used in television channels broadcasting under license issued in the Netherlands (independent from the country for which the channels are dedicated).

== New Zealand ==
The Films, Videos, and Publications Classification Act 1993 gives the Office of Film and Literature Classification the power to classify publications into three categories: unrestricted, restricted, or "objectionable" (banned). With a few exceptions, films, videos, DVDs and restricted computer games must carry a label before being offered for supply or exhibited to the public.

In 2017 the Office of Film and Literature Classification created a special RP18 rating for online content in response to the Netflix television series, 13 Reasons Why. The new classification reflects concerns raised with 17 and 18 year olds in New Zealand being at a higher risk of suicide. The current ratings are:

New Zealand Ratings
- G: Anyone can be shown or sold this.
- PG: Films and games with a PG label can be sold, hired, or shown to anyone. The PG label means guidance from a parent or guardian is recommended for younger viewers.
- M: Films and games with an M label can be sold, hired, or shown to anyone. Films with an M label are more suitable for mature audiences 16 years and over.
- RP13: Restricted to persons 13 years and over unless accompanied by a Parent/Guardian.
- RP16: Restricted to persons 16 years and over unless accompanied by a Parent/Guardian.
- RP18: Restricted to persons 18 years and over unless accompanied by a Parent/Guardian (online content only).
- R13: Restricted to persons 13 years and over.
- R15: Restricted to persons 15 years and over.
- R16: Restricted to persons 16 years and over.
- R18: Restricted to persons 18 years and over.
- R: Restricted exclusively to a certain audience.

== Nigeria ==
Nigerian Ratings

The National Film and Video Censors Board classifies films, videos, DVDs, and VCDs. Classifications carrying an age rating are legally restricted, although the "15" and "18" classifications do not apply to people below 2 years of age. The categories are:

- G: Suitable for general exhibition. Content is appropriate for all audiences including children of all ages.
- PG: Some material may not be suitable for young children. Parental guidance is suggested for children under 12.
- 12A: Not suitable for people under the age of 12. A child must be accompanied by an adult to view the film.
- 12: Not permitted for people under the age of 12.
- 15: Not permitted for persons under the age of 15.
- 18: Not permitted for people under the age of 18.
- RE: Films which fall under this category are to be exhibited and distributed only in specially licensed premises.

== Norway ==
In Norway, all films—whether they are exhibited in cinemas, distributed on video, shown on television or streamed through on-demand services—are required by law to be classified. Films shown in cinemas must be classified by the distributor, and films made available by other means must be classified by whoever who has the rights to make them available in Norway. Classifications are mandated to follow the guidelines and age limits set by the Norwegian Media Authority (Medietilsynet). The law previously required films to be classified by the Norwegian Media Authority, but this was repealed in 2022.

The Norwegian Media Authority ratings

The following age limits apply to films:

- A – Suitable for all.
- 6 – 6 years (no restriction for children accompanied by an adult).
- 9 – 9 years (children down to 6 years accompanied by an adult).
- 12 – 12 years (children down to 9 years accompanied by an adult).
- 15 – 15 years (children down to 12 years accompanied by an adult).
- 18 – 18 years (no one under this age admitted).

== Papua New Guinea ==
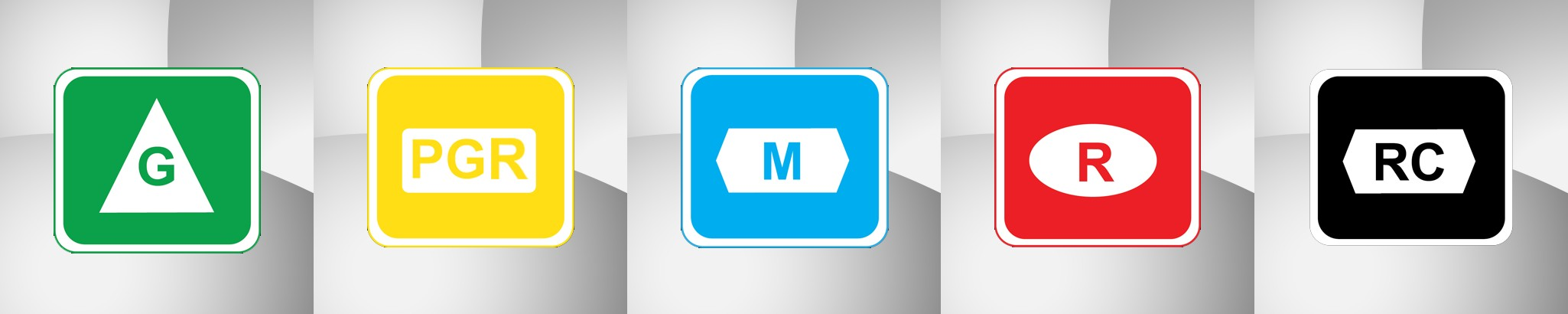
Motion picture content rating labels used in Papua New Guinea

In Papua New Guinea, films are classified by the Office of Censorship under the Classification of Publication (Censorship) Act 1989. The Office of Censorship, headed by the Chief Censor, is responsible for examining films and advertising material submitted for public exhibition. Films are assessed for their suitability based on their content, including depictions of sex, drug misuse or addiction, crime, cruelty, violence, or other material that may be offensive or unsuitable for minors. Applications may also be referred to the Censorship Board for classification where appropriate.

Films are classified into the following categories:

- G (General Exhibition): Suitable for people of all ages. Parents can be confident that children may watch a G-rated film without being harmed or distressed.
- PGR (Parental Guidance Required): Parents may choose to provide guidance for persons under the age of 18. PGR-rated films may contain mild coarse language, mild stylized, theatrical or historical violence, or discreet references to sex.
- MA (Note: The official classification logo uses M, whereas the Office of Censorship website refers to the classification as MA (Mature Audiences).) (Mature Audiences): Recommended for mature audiences aged 18 years and over because the themes or content may disturb, harm, or offend persons under 18. MA-rated films may contain coarse language, implied sexual activity, and violence of medium intensity.
- R (Restricted Exhibition): Restricted by law to persons 24 years of age and over. R-rated films may contain strong language, highly realistic and explicit violence (provided it is not unduly detailed or cruel), and simulated sexual acts.
- RC (Refused Classification): Films refused classification are illegal to publicly exhibit, sell, or hire. This applies to films containing, for example, unduly detailed or cruel violence, explicit sexual activity, depictions of child sexual abuse, or other material considered unacceptable.

== Philippines ==
The rating labels used in the Philippines

In the Philippines, motion pictures, along with television programs, are rated by the Movie and Television Review and Classification Board, a special agency of the Office of the President. As of 2012, the Board uses six classification ratings.

- G (General Audiences) – Viewers of all ages are admitted.
- PG (Parental Guidance) – Viewers below 13 years old must be accompanied by a parent or supervising adult.
- R-13 (Restricted-13) – Only viewers who are 13 years old and above can be admitted.
- R-16 (Restricted-16) – Only viewers who are 16 years old and above can be admitted.
- R-18 (Restricted-18) – Only viewers who are 18 years old and above can be admitted.
- X (Not For Public Exhibition) – "X-rated" films are not suitable for public exhibition.

Independent, foreign-language and art-house films released in the Philippines are not rated by the MTRCB themselves but are instead rated through the Film Development Council of the Philippines. Nevertheless, the same rating system applies.

== Portugal ==
Movies are rated in Portugal by the Comissão de Classificação de Espectáculos of the Ministry of Culture. In cinemas the ratings are mandatory (subject to parental guidance) whereas for video releases they are merely advisory, except in the case of pornographic content. Children under the age of 4 were formerly prohibited from public film performances, but a special category was introduced for this age group when the classification system was overhauled in 2014. A category for 14-year-olds was also introduced, and the lowest age rating was dropped from 4 years of age to 3. The categories are the following:

- Para todos os públicos – For all the public (especially designed for children under 3 years of age).
- M/3 Passed for viewers aged 3 and older.
- M/6 Passed for viewers aged 6 and older.
- M/12 Passed for viewers aged 12 and older.
- M/14 Passed for viewers aged 14 and older.
- M/16 Passed for viewers aged 16 and older.
- M/18 Passed for viewers aged 18 and older.
  - P Special rating supplementary to the M/18 age rating denoting "pornography".

== Qatar ==
Ratings in Qatar are set by the Ministry of Culture and Sports.

- G – General Audience
- PG – Parental Guidance
- PG-13 – Individuals under 13 not admitted without adult accompaniment.
- PG-15 – Individuals under 15 not admitted without adult accompaniment.
- 15+ – Individuals under 15 not admitted.
- 18+ – Individuals under 18 not admitted.

== Romania ==
Ratings in Romania are set by the National Center of Cinematography (Romanian: Centrul Național al Cinematografiei) (CNC).

- AG (audiență generală) – General audience.
- AP-12 (acordul părinților pentru copiii sub 12 ani) – Parental guidance for children under 12.
- N-15 (nerecomandat tinerilor sub 15 ani) – Not recommended for children under 15.
- IM-18 (interzis minorilor) – Prohibited to minors under 18.
- IM-18-XXX (interzis minorilor și proiecției cu public) – Prohibited to minors under 18 and projection in public.
- IC (interdicție de comunicare) – Prohibition of communication, indicates a total ban of public exhibition and/or distribution within the country.

== Russia ==
Since 2012, the rating appears inside circles, which indicate age restrictions followed by a plus(+), and appears in most shows, including TV and Internet shows in Russia.

Russian rating system

The indication shown:

- 0+ – All ages are admitted.
- 6+ для детей старше 6 лет (For children over 6 years) – Unsuitable for children under 6.
- 12+ для детей старше 12 лет (For children over 12 years) – Unsuitable for children under 12.
- 16+ для детей старше 16 лет (For children over 16 years) – Unsuitable for children under 16.
- 18+ запрещено для детей (Prohibited for children) – Prohibited for children under 18.
- Фильмы, которым отказано в классификации (Refused classification) – Banned.

== Saudi Arabia ==
Film classification in Saudi Arabia is administered by the General Authority of Media Regulation (Gmedia; formerly known as the General Commission for Audiovisual Media or GCAM), after the reintroduction of film theatres in the country, as of 2017. GCAM (now Gmedia) officially approved a system in 2018, and revised it in 2022 to incorporate a "PG15" rating, which has later officially replaced the "R12" rating. The classifications are:

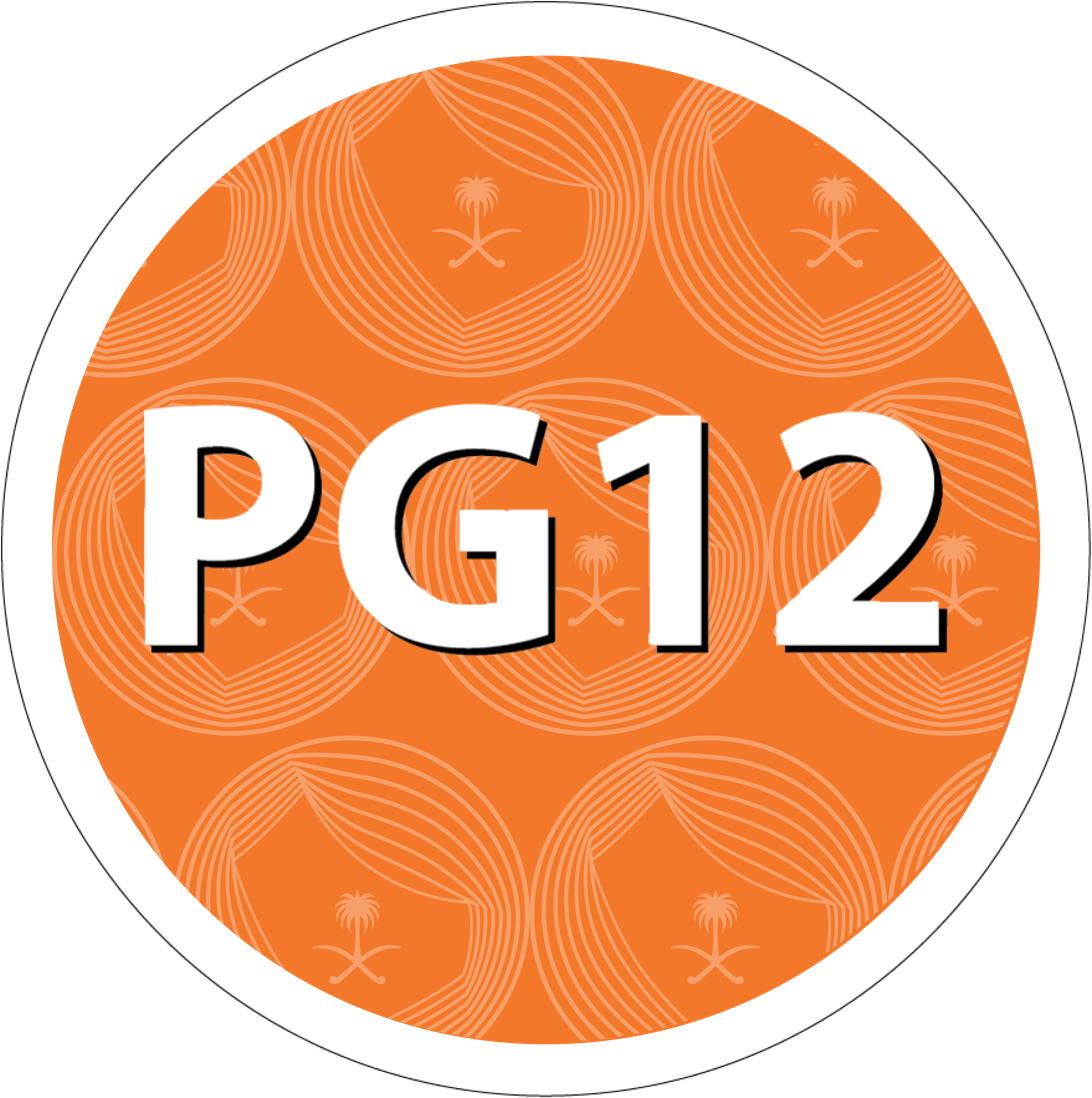
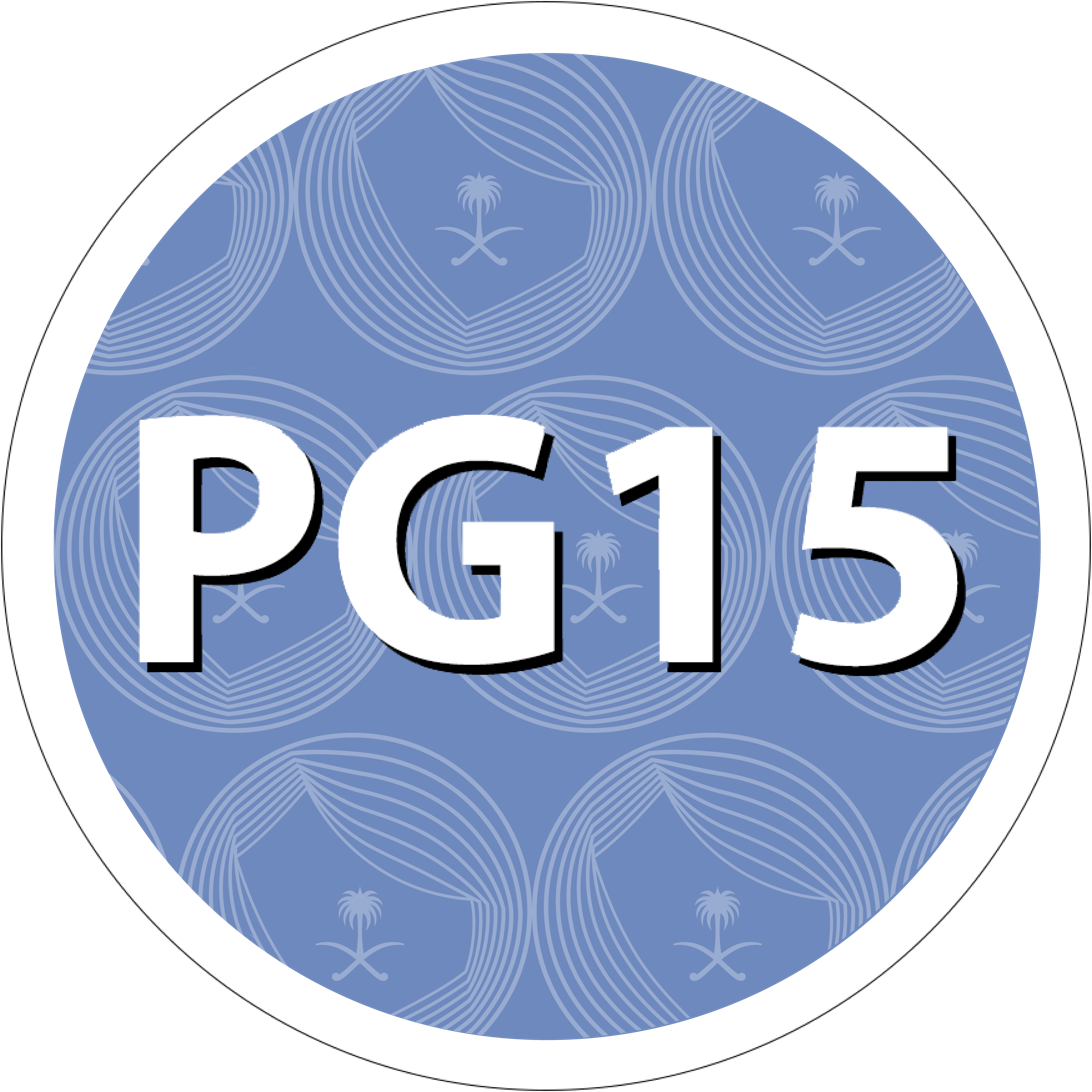
Gmedia classification symbols as of December 2023
- G: General – For the general public.
- PG: Parental Guidance – Adult supervision recommended for children under the age of 12.
- PG12: Parental Guidance 12 – Adult supervision required for children under the age of 12.
- PG15: Parental Guidance 15 – Adult supervision required for children under the age of 15.
- R15: Audiences under the age of 15 are prohibited.
- R18: Audiences under the age of 18 are prohibited.

== Singapore ==
Film classification in Singapore was introduced on 1 July 1991 and comes under the jurisdiction of the Board of Film Censors (BFC), currently part of the Infocomm Media Development Authority (IMDA). There were three ratings originally: G (General), PG (Parental Guidance) and R (Restricted to 18 years and above). Prior to then films were either approved or effectively banned. Since then, there have been several alterations to the ratings over the years. In September 1991, a Restricted (Artistic) (R(A)) rating was introduced to replace the previous R-rating so as to allow the screening of certain art-house films which would otherwise have been banned without said rating, with an increased age restriction set at 21 years of age. The R(A) rating has since been replaced by NC16 (No Children under 16), M18 (Mature 18) and R21 (Restricted 21). A PG13 (Parental Guidance 13) rating, introduced in 2011, is the latest rating to be introduced. The G, PG and PG13 ratings are advisory while NC16, M18 and R21 carry age restrictions. Video ratings are mostly the same as the cinema ratings, except only go up to M18. Some titles, such as documentaries, children's programmes and sports programmes may be exempt from classification on video, but all titles must be classified for public theatrical exhibition.

Singapore's film rating symbols as of 2021

The categories are:

- G: General – Suitable for all ages.
- PG: Parental Guidance – Suitable for all but parents should guide their young.
- PG13: Parental Guidance 13 – Suitable for persons aged 13 and above but parental guidance is advised for children below 13.
- NC16: No Children Under 16 – Suitable for persons aged 16 and above.
- M18: Mature 18 – Suitable for persons aged 18 and above.
- R21: Restricted 21 – Suitable for adults aged 21 and above (restricted to licensed cinemas).

In exceptional cases, a film may be refused classification if it either exceeds the permissible limits of the R21 classification, contains any material that undermines or is likely to undermine public order, or is likely to be prejudicial to national interest.

== Slovakia ==
Jednotný systém označovania (English: Unified System of Age Rating/Labeling) (JSO) is a statutory board of Ministry of Culture of Slovakia under act 589/2007, which regulates age restriction of films, television programs and video games in Slovakia. In 2024, rating were once again updated, this time content descriptions were added and ratings -7, 7+, 12+ and 15+ were abolished.

The rating labels and content descriptors used in Slovakia

The age ratings are:

- "Teddy bear's head" – Content suitable for children younger than 12 years.
- U – General audience
- 7 – Not recommended for children younger than 7 years.
- 12 – Not recommended for people younger than 12 years.
- 15 – Not recommended for people younger than 15 years.
- 18 – Prohibited for minors under 18 years of age.
Educational movie ratings that were used in Slovakia

The educational movie ratings, which have since been abolished, were:

- -7 – Targeted at children younger than 7 years.
- 7+ – Appropriate for children older than 7 years.
- 12+ – Appropriate for people 12 years and over.
- 15+ – Appropriate for people 15 years and over.

New content descriptors and icons were added, including ones for sex, nudity (Slovak: nahota), drugs (zavislost), vulgar language (vulgarismus), violence (nasilie), discrimination (diskriminacia), and fear (strach).

== South Africa ==
In South Africa, films are classified by the Film and Publication Board. Distributors and exhibitors are legally compelled to comply with the age ratings. All broadcasters, cinemas and distributors of DVD/video and computer games must comply with the following:

The FPB's rating categories
- A: Suitable for all.
- PG: Parental Guidance
- 7–9PG: Not suitable for children under the age of 7. Children aged 7–9 years old may not be admitted unless accompanied by an adult.
- 10–12PG: Not suitable for children under the age of 10. Children aged 10–12 years old may not be admitted unless accompanied by an adult.
- 13: Not suitable for children under the age of 13.
- 16: Not suitable for persons under the age of 16.
- 18: Not suitable for persons under the age of 18.
- X18: No one under 18 admitted; restricted to licensed adult premises.
- XX: Must not be distributed or exhibited in public.

There are also sub-descriptors used with some of the ratings:

The FPB's rating descriptors
- S for sex.
- L for language.
- V for violence.
- P for prejudice.
- N for nudity.
- H for horror.
- D for substance abuse.
- SV for sexual violence.

== South Korea ==
KMRB rating logos and content descriptors

The Korea Media Rating Board (영상물등급위원회) in Busan administers South Korea's film classification system. There are five ratings: an "All" category for films that are suitable for all ages, three age-restrictive categories, and a "restrictive" rating, which limits exhibition to specially licensed venues. Children below the ages of 12 and 15 are allowed into films rated 12 and 15, respectively; this is only if accompanied by an adult. The 19-rating replaced the 18-rating on May 1, 2024; this change was retrospective, meaning that all films which were previously rated 18 had their former ratings withdrawn and uprated to 19. As with the previous classification, minors are prohibited. The KMRB divides licensed films into the following categories:

- ALL (전체관람가) – Film suitable for all ages.
- 12 (12세이상관람가) – Film intended for audiences 12 and over. Underage audiences accompanied by a parent or guardian are allowed.
- 15 (15세이상관람가) – Film intended for audiences 15 and over. Underage audiences accompanied by a parent or guardian are allowed.
- 19 (청소년관람불가) – No one under 19 is allowed to watch this film.
- Restricted Screening (제한상영가) – Film needs a certain restriction in screening or advertisement as it is considered an especially undesirable influence to universal human dignity, social value, good customs or national emotion due to excessive expression of nudity, violence, social behavior, etc. This is technically not an age restriction but films with this rating may only be screened at "adults only" theatres, with the age of majority set at 19.

Classification ratings are determined by the following:

- Theme (주제) - The effect on the emotions and values of the age group as well as the ability to understand and accept the theme.
- Sex and Nudity (선정성) - Level of bodily exposure as well as other sexual actions and references.
- Violence (폭력성) - Level of injury and oppression through torture, war, pain, indignity, and sexual violence.
- Language (대사) - Level and frequency of expletives and other vulgar language.
- Horror (공포) - Level of psychological shock resulting from tension, alarming stimuli, and threats.
- Drugs (약물) - Level of drug use and promotion or glorification of such activities.
- Imitative Behavior (모방위험) - Level of encouragement and stimulus to perform problematic behavior depicted.

== Spain ==
All films to be commercially released in Spain in any medium must be submitted to the ICAA (Instituto de Cinematografía y Artes Audiovisuales - Cinematography and Audiovisual Arts Institute). Classifications are advisory except for X-rated films, which are restricted to specially licensed venues. A supplementary classification, "Especialmente Recomendada para la Infancia" (Especially recommended for children), is sometimes appended to the lowest two classifications. Another supplementary classification, "Especialmente recomendada para el fomento de la igualdad de género" (Especially recommended for the promotion of gender equality), is sometimes appended to any of the classifications except the last one.

Spanish classifications
- A(i) – General admission.
- 7(i) – Not recommended for audiences under 7.
- 12 – Not recommended for audiences under 12.
- 16 – Not recommended for audiences under 16.
- 18 – Not recommended for audiences under 18.
- X – Prohibited for audiences under 18 (may only be shown in premises where adult films are screened).

== Sweden ==
The Swedish Media Council ("Statens medieråd") is a government agency with the aims to reduce the risk of harmful media influences among minors and to empower minors as conscious media users. The classification bestowed on a film should not be viewed as recommendations on the suitability for children, as the law the council operates under (SFS 2010:1882) only mandates them to assess the relative risk to children's well-being. It is not a legal requirement to submit a film to the Media Council. The councils classification only applies to public exhibition, and the law does not require classification of home media.

The following categories are used:

- Btl (Barntillåten) – All ages.
- 7 – Children under the age of 7, who are accompanied by an adult, are admitted to films that have been passed for children from the age of 7.
- 11 – Children over the age of 7, who are accompanied by an adult, are admitted to films that have been passed for children from the age of 11.
- Not Approved/15 – Children over the age of 11, who are accompanied by an adult, are admitted to films with a 15-year limit.

== Switzerland ==
The Swiss Commission for Youth Protection in Film (Schweizerische Kommission Jugendschutz im Film, Commission nationale du film et de la protection des mineurs, Commissione svizzera del film e della tutela dei giovani) is a commission protecting minors from harmful material in film. It was established in 2012. Under Swiss law, however, children up to two years younger than the age recommendations will be admitted if accompanied by a person invested with parental authority.

- No age restriction
- from 6 years
- from 8 years
- from 10 years
- from 12 years
- from 14 years
- from 16 years
- from 18 years

== Taiwan ==
From 1994 until 2015, the Government Information Office (GIO) classified films into four categories (General Audience/Protected/Parental Guidance/Restricted) pursuant to its issued Regulations Governing the Classification of Motion Pictures of the Republic of China (電影片分級處理辦法 in traditional Chinese): The "Parental Guidance" rating previously prohibited viewing by children under the age of 12 and required adolescents aged 12–17 to be accompanied by an adult. In 2015, the "Parental Guidance" rating was further divided into two categories: one that prohibits children under the age of 12 and one that prohibits adolescents under the age of 15.

The revised Taiwan motion picture rating system which took effect from 16 October 2015
- 0+: 普遍級(普) (General Audience) – Viewing is permitted for audiences of all ages.
- 6+: 保護級(護) (Protected) – Viewing is not permitted for children under 6; children between 6 and 11 shall be accompanied and given guidance by parents, teachers, seniors, adult relatives or friends.
- 12+: 輔導十二歲級(輔12) (Parental Guidance 12) – Viewing is not permitted for children under 12.
- 15+: 輔導十五歲級(輔15) (Parental Guidance 15) – Viewing is not permitted for those under 15.
- 18+: 限制級(限) (Restricted) – Viewing is not permitted for those under 18.

== Thailand ==
A motion picture rating system was proposed in the Film and Video Act of 2007, and was passed on December 20, 2007, by the Thai military-appointed National Legislative Assembly, replacing laws which had been in place since 1930. The draft law was met with resistance from the film industry and independent filmmakers. Activists had hoped for a less-restrictive approach; however, films are still subject to censorship, or can be banned from release altogether if the film is deemed to "undermine or disrupt social order and moral decency, or might impact national security or the pride of the nation".

Thai film rating symbols

The ratings were put into effect in August 2009. They are as follows:

- P – Educational.
- G – General audience.
- 13 – Suitable for viewers aged 13 years and over.
- 15 – Suitable for viewers aged 15 years and over.
- 18 – Suitable for viewers aged 18 years and over.
- 20 – Content is unsuitable for viewers aged under 20.
- Banned – Films that are not allowed to screen publicly in Thailand.

== Turkey ==
In Turkey, movies to be shown in cinemas are rated by the Evaluation and Classification Board of the Ministry of Culture and Tourism. All films to be made commercially available must be classified, except in the case of educational films which are labeled as "for educational purposes" instead. The board also has the power to refuse classification in extreme cases (producers and distributors can submit an edited version of a movie to the board but edited versions may also be rejected if still deemed inappropriate); in this case, the movie will be banned with the exception of special artistic activities like fairs, festivals, feasts and carnivals.

The rating labels and content descriptors used in Turkey
- Genel İzleyici Kitlesi – General audience.
- 6A – Viewers under the age of 6 may watch with accompanying family members.
- 6+ – Restricted to viewers aged 6 and over.
- 10A – Viewers under the age of 10 may watch with accompanying family members.
- 10+ – Restricted to viewers aged 10 and over.
- 13A – Viewers under the age of 13 may watch with accompanying family members.
- 13+ – Restricted to viewers aged 13 and over.
- 16+ – Restricted to viewers aged 16 and over.
- 18+ – Restricted to viewers aged 18 and over.

Under this rating system, content may be assigned multiple ratings, with one signifying a minimum age of attendance, and the other signifying the minimum age of unaccompanied attendance. In addition to the age ratings, content is also assessed for violence/horror, sexuality and negative examples i.e. drugs, vulgar and slang language.

== Ukraine ==
The Ukrainian State Film Agency is the central executive body of cinematography in Ukraine. The Ratings issued by the Derzhkino are:

- DA: ДА (Дитяча аудиторія): Film aimed for children. They contain no violence or obscenity.
- ZA: ЗА (Загальна аудиторія): Suitable for all.
- 12: Suitable for children aged 12 and older; those under 12 may be admitted if accompanied by an adult as parents may find upsetting to them.
- 16: Not allowed for viewing by persons under 16 years of age.
- 18: Not allowed for viewing by persons under 18 years of age. Additionally, "18" rated features may only be screened in theatres after 18:00, and they may be broadcast on television only after 22:00.
- Denied: Відмовлено: Refused a classification by the Derzhkino. Content may not be shown, advertised, or distributed anywhere in Ukraine.
  - Films can be rejected if they promote war, violence, cruelty, and fascism aimed at eliminating Ukraine's independence.

== United Arab Emirates ==
The United Arab Emirates has had a form of an age rating system for theatrical films since circa early 1980s, established under the federal 1980 Press and Publications Law, and originally authorised by the Ministry of Information and Culture (1972–2006). The National Media Council, established in 2006 when the ministry was eventually dissolved, would continue practising categorising films by perceiving content until February 2018, when it officially re-established the film age rating system under new guidelines, whilst also introducing new age rating systems for video games and print publications.

In June 2021, the Ministry of Culture and Youth launched the Media Regulatory Office to execute a number of functions and tasks previously under the National Media Council, following a restructure of the federal U.A.E. government that was approved in July 2020. This made the Media Regulatory Office the current authority for age ratings in the U.A.E. as of June 2021. The New Media Law came into force on December 1, 2023, in which the top logo of the label changed to reflect the corporate image of the UAE Media Council which went into effect in 2024. In December 2025, the federal government issued a legislation to establish the National Media Authority, effectively replacing the UAE Media Council and its parent entity the National Media Office.

U.A.E.'s film rating symbols as of 2024

As of December 2021, the following are the official classifications used for films in the U.A.E.:

- G – For public viewing, suitable for all age groups.
- PG – For public viewing, with adult supervision.
- PG13 – Persons below 13 allowed with adult supervisions.
- PG15 – Persons below 15 allowed with adult supervisions.
- 15+ – Ages 15 and above only.
- 18+ – Ages 18 and above only.
- 21+ – Ages 21 and above only. Films that receive this classification are legally restricted to its age group, but are authorised for commercial exhibition guaranteed without edits.

== United Kingdom ==
The British Board of Film Classification (BBFC) classifies films to be publicly exhibited in the United Kingdom, although statutory powers remain with local councils which can overrule any of the BBFC's decisions. Since 1984, the BBFC also classifies films made commercially available through a home video format. If the BBFC refuses a classification this effectively amounts to a ban (although local councils retain the legal right to overturn it in the case of cinema exhibition). The BBFC's regulatory powers do not extend to the Internet, so a film they have banned on physical media can still be made available via streaming media/video on demand. Videos designed to inform, educate or instruct or concerned with sport, religion or music are exempt from classification; exempt films may be marked as "E", but this is not an official label.

BBFC classification symbols (from 2019)

The current BBFC system is:

- U (Universal – Suitable for all) – A U-rated film should be suitable for audiences aged four years and over.
- PG (Parental Guidance) – General viewing, but some scenes may be unsuitable for young children. A PG-rated film should not unsettle a child aged around eight or older.
- 12A/12 (Suitable for 12 years and over) – Films classified 12A and video works classified 12 contain material that is not generally suitable for children aged under 12. No one younger than 12 may see a 12A-rated film in a cinema unless accompanied by an adult. No one younger than 12 may rent or buy a 12 rated video work.
- 15 (Suitable only for 15 years and older) – No-one under 15 is allowed to see a 15-rated film at the cinema or buy/rent a 15-rated video.
- 18 (Suitable only for adults) – No-one under 18 is allowed to see an 18-rated film at the cinema or buy/rent an 18-rated video.
- R18 (To be shown only in specially licensed cinemas, or supplied only in licensed sex shops, and to adults only) – The R18 category is a special and legally restricted classification primarily for explicit works of consenting sex or strong fetish material involving adults. Films may only be shown to adults in specially licensed cinemas, and video works may be supplied to adults only in licensed sex shops. R18-rated video works may not be supplied by mail order.

Older video works still in circulation may still carry the deprecated Uc label, classifying the work as "Especially suitable for pre-school children".

== United States ==
In the United States, film classification is a voluntary process with the ratings issued by the Motion Picture Association (MPA) via the Classification and Rating Administration (CARA). The system was established in 1968, but the version listed below is the most recent revision, having been in effect since 1996. An unrated film is often informally denoted by "NR" in newspapers and so forth.

Current American film ratings, since 1990
- G (General Audiences) – All ages admitted.
- PG (Parental Guidance Suggested) – Some material may not be suitable for children.
- PG-13 (Parents Strongly Cautioned) – Some material may be inappropriate for children under 13.
- R (Restricted) – Under 17 requires accompanying parent or adult guardian.
- NC-17 (Adults Only) – No one 17 and under admitted.

== Uruguay ==
In Uruguay, films are classified by the Instituto del Niño y Adolescente del Uruguay (INAU) under Resolution No. 2526/04, as amended by Resolution No. 1227/07. Films are examined by honorary classification tribunals composed of three members, who assess each work in accordance with the rights of children and adolescents, respect for human dignity, educational and cultural values, the development of the story and its message, as well as depictions of violence, discrimination, pornography, and other content that may negatively affect minors. Decisions may be appealed to a separate reclassification tribunal, whose ruling is final.

Films are classified into seven categories:

- ATP (Autorizado para Todo Público): Suitable for all audiences.
- AM 6: Suitable for audiences aged 6 years and over. Children under 6 may attend only when accompanied by a parent or legal guardian.
- AM 9: Suitable for audiences aged 9 years and over. Children under 9 may attend only when accompanied by a parent or legal guardian.
- AM 12: Suitable for audiences aged 12 years and over. Children under 12 may attend only when accompanied by a parent or legal guardian.
- AM 15: Suitable for audiences aged 15 years and over. Children under 15 may attend only when accompanied by a parent or legal guardian.
- AM 18: Suitable for audiences aged 18 years and over. Persons under 18 may attend only when accompanied by a parent or legal guardian.
- R 18: Restricted to persons aged 18 years and over. No person under 18 may be admitted. Films containing explicit sexual content are automatically classified as R 18.

== Venezuela ==
Age ratings are divided into several categories. The age that corresponds to the category and the level of enforcement is defined by municipality ordinances.

In the San Cristóbal municipality the following ratings apply:

- AA – Aimed at children under 12 years of age.
- A – Suitable for all ages.
- B – Suitable for audiences aged 12 years or older.
- C – Suitable for audiences aged 16 years or older.
- D – Suitable for audiences aged 18 years or older.

In the Baruta municipality the following ratings apply:

- A – Suitable for all ages.
- B – Suitable for audiences aged 12 years or older.
- C – Suitable for audiences aged 16 years or older.
- D – Suitable for adults.

In the Maracaibo municipality children under the age of two are not admitted to performances and the ratings are enforced:

- A – Suitable for all ages.
- B – Suitable for audiences aged 14 years or older.
- C – Suitable for audiences aged 18 years or older.

== Vietnam ==
All theatrical releases are screened by the Cinema Department of the Ministry of Culture, Sport and Travel of Vietnam to ensure suitability for public viewing. Regardless of the rating, some scenes may be altered or removed to comply with regulations. The classification was revised in 2022 to incorporate a parental accompaniment rating.

The current ratings are:

- P (Vietnamese: Phổ cập, lit. 'universal') – Suitable for all ages.
- K – Viewers under 13 years old are admitted provided that they are with their parents or guardians.
- T13 – Viewers under age 13 are not admitted.
- T16 – Viewers under age 16 are not admitted.
- T18 – Viewers under age 18 are not admitted.
- C – Prohibited.

== See also ==
- Mobile software content rating system
- Television content rating system
- Video game content rating system
