= Régie du cinéma (Quebec) =

Former film classification agency in Canada

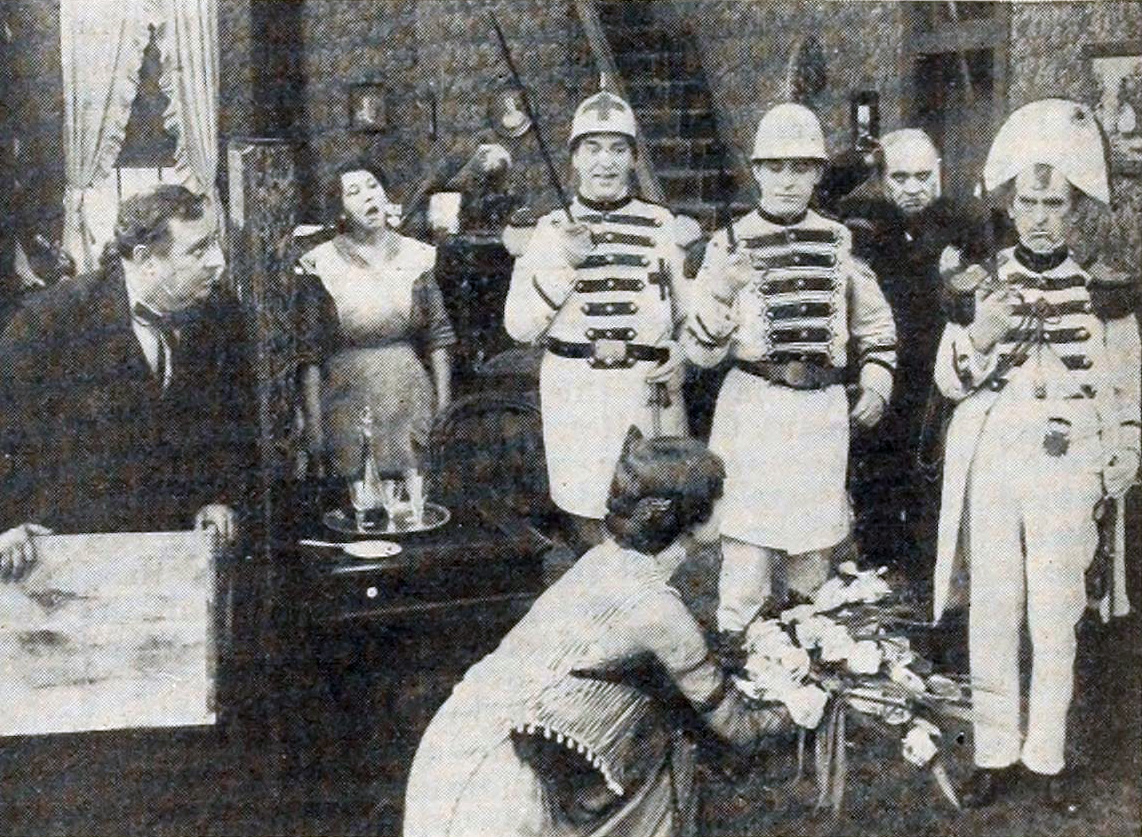
A Milk White Flag, a 1916 burlesque short, was refused by the Régie as "not in good taste from a military point of view".

The Régie du cinéma (French pronunciation: [ʁeʒi dy sinema]) was a provincial film classification organization responsible for the motion picture rating system within the Canadian province of Quebec. Existing in several guises since the start of the 20th century, the organization came into being in its final form as a department of the Government of Quebec's Ministry of Culture and Communications (MCC) on 23 June 1983. Its roles were merged and fully integrated into the MCC on 1 April 2017. Its mandate was to classify and approve films for distribution to Quebec's movie theatres and home video outlets. Its purview devolved from the Cinema Act (RSQ, C-18.1). As of 2010, the organization had a net income of 7 million dollars and had accumulated more than 85 million dollars in cash in their bank account.

== Rating system ==
The Régie du cinéma rates all films and videos. The same classifications are used for television broadcasts, who make their own determinations as to a program's rating.

The current ratings are:

Rating Label	Description
G	Visa général (General Rating) May be viewed, rented or purchased by persons of all ages. If a film carrying a "G" rating might offend the sensibilities of a child under 8 years of age, "Not suitable for young children" (Déconseillé aux jeunes enfants) is appended to the classification.
13+	13 ans et plus (13 years and over) May be viewed, rented or purchased only by persons 13 years of age and over. Children under 13 may be admitted to a public showing of the film but only if accompanied by an adult.
16+	16 ans et plus (16 years and over) May be viewed, rented or purchased only by persons 16 years of age and over.
18+	18 ans et plus (18 years and over) May be viewed, rented or purchased only by persons 18 years of age and over. The 18+ rating is usually reserved for pornographic movies or works that are especially violent, cruel or feature torture. An Explicit Sexuality indication requires retailers to place materials out of the reach of minors, in a separate room.

Each rating can also include one or a number of complementary indications. The possible combinations (as of 2007) are as follows:

Rating	For children	Not suitable for young children	Coarse language	Eroticism	Violence	Horror	Explicit sexuality
G	✓ (exclusive use)	✓ (exclusive use)	✗ (not used)	✗ (not used)	✗ (not used)	✗ (not used)	✗ (not used)
13+	✗ (not used)	✗ (not used)	✓ (used)	✓ (used)	✓ (used)	✓ (used)	✗ (not used)
16+	✗ (not used)	✗ (not used)	✓ (used)	✓ (used)	✓ (used)	✓ (used)	✗ (deprecated)
18+	✗ (not used)	✗ (not used)	✓ (used)	✓ (used)	✓ (used)	✓ (used)	✓ (used)

G rated films usually can have some swearing in them, as long as the offensive language is not prevalent throughout. Violence can also be permitted, but only in a fantasy context. Sex can be present as long as it is filmed with extreme maintenance. Horror elements can be present, but have to be filmed in a way that would not scare children under 13 years of age. In cases where objectionable material can be found, the Not recommended for young children tag, which indicates that the movie could contain material inappropriate for young children but does not prohibit them from viewing the film, is added to the original rating.

13+ rated films usually have content that likely would not be suitable for young children. Typically, scenes of violence that are darker than what is depicted in traditional fantasy films warrant a 13+ rating. As opposed to G movies, strong horror elements can be present; these are usually accompanied with the Horror tag. Vulgar Language is more prevalent and scenes of sexual acts or nudity can be more explicit.

16+ rated films are usually movies with more explicit violence than what a 13+ movie can afford. Most of these cases, a movie deals with extreme violence. In some cases, it can be for sex and nudity, and that rating usually occurs to soft-core pornography. Horror elements can also be present, although in these cases, they are mostly mixed with violence. In rare cases, a movie is rated 16+ for the language it uses.

18+ rated films are mostly hard-core or soft-core pornography movies, but they can also feature movies of extreme violence and gore. It is rare that a normal movie will get an 18+ rating for the language or horror elements it has. Sometimes, nudity and sex is strong enough to warrant an 18+ rating without going into the edges of pornography, but is usually accompanied by another indication, such as violence.

Movies that have not yet been rated feature the indication En attente de classement (Rating Pending). This is common on print advertising before the release of a movie. The movie must have been rated by the Régie by the time it is released.

While not a classification per se, educational or pedagogical movies, sport and physical exercise programs, and promotional materials are exempt from classification.

The Régie does not cut sequences from movies; they are rated in the format provided by the production company. Nonetheless, the Régie has the authority to deny classification, in which case the movie cannot be distributed in any format in the province of Québec. Such movies usually feature inhumane sexual exploitation.

== See also ==
- Canadian motion picture rating system
- Canadian Home Video Rating System, the English-speaking equivalent of the Régie's ratings for home video materials
