= Saskatchewan Film and Video Classification Board =

The Saskatchewan Film and Video Classification Board is a board of the Saskatchewan Department of Justice responsible for providing film and video classification documents to movie theatres in the Canadian province of Saskatchewan. The Board was formerly responsible for reviewing films and granting film ratings, but since 1 October 1997 these duties have been done by the British Columbia Film Classification Office on Saskatchewan's behalf.

In 1994, the Board briefly achieved international notoriety when it banned the BDSM-based comedy film Exit to Eden from being shown in Saskatchewan theaters. This was the first time a major Hollywood film had been banned in Canada since Pretty Baby was temporarily banned in some jurisdictions in 1978. After a significant public outcry, the ban was lifted a few days later.

The Board is empowered by Saskatchewan's Film and Video Classification Act.

== Film ratings ==
- General (G): A film is to be classified as General if the contents are considered acceptable for all age groups. Films with this rating are allowed to include: occasional violence, occasional swearing and coarse language, the most innocent of sexually suggestive scenes and nudity. If a film includes any of the above, a warning accompanying the films advertisements may be required.
- Parental Guidance (PG): A film is to be classified as Parental Guidance where the themes or content of the film may not be suitable for all children, although there is no age restriction.
- 14A: A film is to be classified as 14A where the film is suitable for viewing by people aged 14 or older. Children under 14 are admitted if accompanied by an adult. Films with this rating may contain: violence, coarse language, and/or sexually suggestive scenes. Parents Cautioned
- 18A: A film is to be classified as 18A where the film is suitable for viewing by people aged 18 or older -- not for people under age 18 unless accompanied by an adult. Films with this rating will contain: horror, explicit violence, frequent coarse language and sexually suggestive scenes. Parents Strongly Cautioned
- Restricted (R): People under the age of 18 are not granted entrance to "Restricted" films. Films with a restricted rating contain some or all of the following: sexually explicit scenes, brutal violence, intense horror and/or other disturbing scenes, frequent use of coarse language and swearing.
- Adult (A): Admittance to films classified as "Adult" is strictly prohibited to persons under the age of 18. The content is not suitable for minors -- contains predominantly sexually explicit activity, explicit violence and/or scenes of brutality or torture to persons or animals.
