= List of content rating systems =

Rating of the suitability of entertainment to its audience

A content rating (also known as maturity rating) rates the suitability of TV shows, movies, comic books, or video games to this primary targeted audience. A content rating usually places a media source into one of a number of different categories, to show which age groups are suitable to view media and entertainment. The individual categories include the stated age groups within the category, along with all ages greater than the ages of that category.

== Film ==
- Motion picture content rating system
  - MPA film rating system
  - Canadian Home Video Rating System
  - Maritime Film Classification Board
  - British Board Of Film Classification

== Television ==
- Television content rating system
  - Federal Communications Commission
  - TV Parental Guidelines
  - United States pay television content advisory system

== Video games ==
- Video game content rating system
  - Entertainment Software Rating Board
  - Videogame Rating Council
  - Pan European Game Information
  - Computer Entertainment Rating Organization
  - On Protecting Children from Information Harmful to Their Health and Development (Russia)

== Internet ==
- Content-control software
  - Internet Content Rating Association
  - Association of Sites Advocating Child Protection – RTA "Restricted to Adults" label
  - Platform for Internet Content Selection
  - Internet Watch Foundation – maintains a website denylist
  - Digital media

== Comics ==
- Comics Code Authority
  - Marvel Rating System
  - DC Comics rating system
  - Viz Media Manga distribution rating system

== Music ==
- RIAA's Parental Advisory

== Legal means of content regulation and prohibition ==
- United States obscenity law
- Communications Decency Act
- Miller test
- Dost test

== Various ==
- Thematic elements – for content that is not specifically covered by generic content rating systems (e.g., grief)
- Australian Classification Board
- Brazilian advisory rating system
- Federal Department for Media Harmful to Young Persons (Germany)
