= British Columbia Film Classification Office =

Film classification organisation in Canada

The British Columbia Film Classification Office, part of Consumer Protection BC (legally known as the Business Practices and Consumer Protection Authority) in the Canadian province of British Columbia, is responsible for rating and censoring films under the province's Motion Picture Act. The BCFCO film ratings are also used by Manitoba and Saskatchewan by bilateral agreement.

== Rating system ==
Since January 1, 1997, the BCFCO has used the following motion picture rating system, based on the Canadian Home Video Rating System, for theatrical releases:

- General. Suitable for viewing by persons of all ages. Occasional violence, swearing and coarse language, and the most innocent of sexually suggestive scenes and nudity, are permitted in this category. According to the Manitoba Film Classification Board (which now uses the same ratings as British Columbia), this rating is similar to the MPAA's G rating used in the United States and the Australian Classification Board's G Rating.
- Parental Guidance. Parental guidance advised. Theme or content may not be suitable for all children although there is no age restriction. Motion pictures in this category may contain less subtle sexually suggestive scenes and nudity and a more realistic portrayal of violence than in the General category; coarse language may occur more often than in the General category. This rating is also similar to the similarly-named MPAA rating and Australian Classification Board rating. (formerly Mature)
- 14A. Suitable for persons 14 years of age or older. Persons under 14 years of age must view these motion pictures accompanied by an adult. Motion pictures in this category may contain violence, coarse language or sexually suggestive scenes, or any combination of them. Most films rated PG-13 by the MPAA, M by the Australian Classification Board and some rated R (typically for language), will be rated in this category. (formerly 14 Years Limited Admission)
- 18A. Suitable for persons 18 years of age or older. Persons under 18 years of age must view these motion pictures accompanied by an adult. Motion pictures in this category will contain horror, explicit violence, frequent coarse language or scenes that are more sexually suggestive than in the 14A category, or any combination of them. This is generally equivalent to the MPAA's R rating and the Australian Classification Board's MA15+ rating, although commercial films rated NC-17 and R18+ may also receive the 18A rating by the BCFCO. (formerly Restricted)
- Restricted. Restricted to persons 18 years of age and over. Persons under 18 years of age are not permitted to attend under any circumstances. These motion pictures are "adult motion pictures", as defined in the Act, and may contain explicit sexual scenes, violence or scenes referred to in Section 5(3) of the Act, or any combination of them. The director will assign this classification to motion pictures if the director considers that the theme, subject matter or plot of the adult motion picture is artistic, historical, political, educational or scientific. This is generally similar to the MPAA's NC-17 rating and the Australian Classification Board's R18+ rating, although most commercial films will be edited to receive an 18A rating instead, as many theatres will not exhibit a Restricted film (much as most films rated NC-17 by the MPAA are edited to receive an R rating instead for their theatrical release; formerly Restricted Designated).
- Adult - Restricted to persons 18 years of age and over. Persons under 18 years of age are not permitted to attend under any circumstances. These motion pictures are "adult motion pictures", as defined in the Act, and may contain explicit sexual scenes or scenes of brutality or torture to persons or animals, or any combination of them, that are portrayed in a realistic and explicit manner; however, the scenes would, in the director's opinion, be tolerable to the community. These films would typically not submitted for a rating to the MPAA in the United States, Equivalent to Australia Classification Board's X18+.

The age ratings are enforced as law in the provinces using them. Titles in the "Restricted" and "Adult" categories have labelling and/or display restrictions under the Motion Picture Act for home video retailing purposes, but not those rated 18A or below.

== The "restricted cougar" symbol ==
The B.C. Film Classification Office originated the restricted cougar symbol in August 1960 as an icon that audiences could easily associate with the former "Restricted" category, which was much broader in application than today's category. The B.C. Film Classification Office "chose the cougar not only for its dramatic presence but also its significance as the largest wild cat native to BC". The symbol was trademarked in 1965 and soon became identified with the movie-going experience, as an animated "Restricted Cougar" trailer typically preceded any film bearing the Restricted rating; according to the BCFCO, "the trailers also added a new excitement to the movie-going experience: when the Cougar made its way to the screen, audiences knew they were only moments away from the highly anticipated feature presentation."

The use of the symbol was discontinued with the adoption of the 18A rating in 1997, although the symbol itself remains a provincial trademark. In 2011, Consumer Protection BC made digital versions of several of the trailers available for viewing on YouTube.
