= Maritime Film Classification Board =

Film classification agency in Canada

The Maritime Film Classification Board was a government organization responsible for reviewing films and granting film ratings in New Brunswick, Nova Scotia and Prince Edward Island.

Created on May 1, 1994, it is jointly funded by all three provinces through the Council of Atlantic Premiers. Nova Scotia is the lead administrator of the program, which provides office space and employees through its Alcohol and Gaming Authority.

Prior to 1994, New Brunswick and Nova Scotia provided their own ratings for theatrical films and rating stickers for videos. However, the New Brunswick ratings were usually identical to those provided by the Nova Scotia Film Classification Board, thus the decision to amalgamate services. Prince Edward Island had no classification board and usually used the ratings from New Brunswick.

Under new legislation in all three provinces, each province can continue to individually regulate and enforce the exhibition and distribution of films, as well as licence theatres and video stores, this specifically includes banning operations, designating adult video stores, etc.

== Rating categories ==
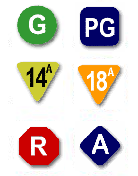
The icons for the currently used rating system.

The following ratings were adopted on April 1, 2005 and are currently in use:

- General (G) – Suitable for viewers of all ages.
- Parental Guidance (PG) – Parental guidance is advised. Theme or content may not be suitable for all children.
- 14 Accompaniment (14A) – Suitable for viewing by persons 14 years of age and older. Persons under 14 must be accompanied by an adult. May contain: violence, coarse language and/or sexually suggestive scenes.
- 18 Accompaniment (18A) – Suitable for viewing by persons 18 years of age and older. Persons between 14 and 17 must be accompanied by an adult. Persons under 14 years of age are strictly prohibited from viewing the film. May contain: explicit violence, frequent coarse language, sexual activity and/or horror.
- Restricted (R) – Admittance restricted to persons 18 years of age and over. No rental or purchase by those under 18. Content not suitable for minors. Contains frequent use of sexual activity, brutal/graphic violence, intense horror and/or other disturbing content.
- Adult (A) – Film is not suitable for viewers under 18 years of age because the sole or primary premise for the film is the depiction of explicit sexual activity, graphic nudity, or graphic violence.

The supervising guardian, in the case of 14A and 18A films, must be 19 years of age or older.

Classification information pieces:

- Not Recommended For Young Children: The film may be inappropriate for young children. An example might be the death of a family pet, a complicated family breakdown, images considered frightening or disturbing for the very young, or cursing.
- Not Recommended For Children: The film may include scenes that reflect a more mature situation, such as drug use/abuse.
- Frightening Scenes: The film contains images that might shock or frighten a person. These scenes might be found in a thriller, suspense or war genre.
- Mature Theme: Contains images or storylines that may be disturbing or incomprehensible to minors. The film may contain portrayals of domestic violence, racism, religious matters, death or controversial social issues.
- Language May Offend: Contains language that may be offensive to some groups, (i.e. sacrilegious language such as Goddamn; also used for PG films that contain expletives.) Some G movies use this language.
- Coarse Language: Product contains profanity, threats, slurs, sexual references or sexual innuendo.
- Crude Content: Material or humour that is unrefined or coarse and that may be seen as harsh, rude, or offensive.
- Nudity: Contains images of full-frontal, partial or rear nudity. The context will be determined by the situation, clarity, detail, repetition, and whether the nudity is in a non-sexual or sexual situation.
- Sexual Content: Film may contain images and/or verbal references of sexual theme, sexual innuendo, fondling, implied sexual activity and simulated sexual activity.
- Violence: May contain restrained portrayals of non-graphic violence, portrayals of violence with some bloodletting and/or tissue damage and frequent more prolonged portrayals of violence resulting in bloodletting and tissue damage. The degree frequency and intensity of the acts of violence will be factors in the classification decision. Used in all ratings.
- Disturbing Content: Indicates the expected natural reaction by an audience to any elements of a film including the tone of a film pertaining to distress or suffering. This includes the implication or threat of physical and/or psychological violence, even when violence is not depicted.
- Substance Abuse: Descriptive scenes depicting; the use of illegal substances, the excessive use of tobacco or the use of alcohol resulting in impairment.
- Gory Scenes: Graphic images of bloodletting and/or tissue damage. Includes horror or war representations. Degree, frequency and intensity will also be a major factor in the classification decision.
- Explicit Sexual Content: Sexual acts, shown in full, clear, unequivocal and realistic detail, that may or may not be gratuitous to the film.
- Brutal Violence: Visually explicit portrayals of violence, which may be characterized by extreme brutality, extreme bloodletting and/or extreme tissue damage. May include images of torture, horror or war.
- Sexual Violence: The degradation of an individual in a sexual manner. May contain images of non-consensual acts with the intent to inflict harm, for example, simulated rape, and/or the use of threat to force compliance in sexual activity.

Also in April 2005, the province of Nova Scotia officially adopted the Entertainment Software Rating Board (ESRB) system of classification for video games.

Source for rating information: Maritime Film Classification Board website.

== History ==
In the early 1900s, motion pictures were rising in popularity. It was decided nationally that censorship of them was necessary in order to be suitable for a wide, general audience of varying ages, mental, and educational levels. However, since national censorship for such a large and diverse country was unworkable, each province would censor according to their own provincial community standards. However, Ontario would be the "main" censor in that theatrical prints would be censored/edited by the Ontario censors then distributed throughout Ontario, and the other provinces. The other provinces would provide additional censorship/editing if it was necessary for their own province.

In the Maritimes, motion pictures were censored for a general audience until the 1950s when the provincial film censor boards began to simply attach an "Adult rating" warning to films if necessary, if the approved film was deemed suitable for adults. All films were still subject to editing by censors if necessary.

The following ratings were used from the late 1960s to the early 1980s:

- General Entertainment
- Adult Entertainment
- Admittance Restricted to persons 18 years of age or over.

Films were still subject to editing by censors until the 1980s, when the boards slowly drifted towards classification. Films that were made for the purpose of "pornography" or "excessive violence" were rejected altogether. Around 1984, rating captions were created for use with all categories. These warnings underwent a few changes over the next few years.

In the late 1980s, the ratings were altered slightly and remained unchanged until December 31, 1993:

- General (G) – Suitable for general audiences.
- Adult (A) – Suitable for ages 14 and older. These films may contain scenes involving hand-to-hand combat, the use of weapons with brief scenes of blood-letting or killing, scenes involving brief or casual nudity, implicit sexual activity not visually portrayed, horror scenes, use of coarse or vulgar language, or violence or nudity that is integral to the plot.
- Restricted (R) – Suitable for ages 18 and older. These films may contain prolonged scenes depicting violence with blood-letting, graphic depiction of accident, intense horror, full nudity, rape or sexual activity, or repeated use of offensive language.
- Exempt (E) – Certain videos were exempt from classification if they were educational videofilms used for instruction in educational institutions, cultural videofilms, heritage videofilms, religious videofilms, children's cartoons, travelogues, political videofilms, videofilms used for industrial or business promotions, videofilms of sporting events, and instructional "how-to" videofilms, other than sexual.

It was around this time that the home video market began to increase in popularity and pornographic films were no longer rejected. Pornographic videos would receive a Restricted rating with an "Explicit Sex" caption. These videos would require segregation from non-pornographic videos.

Some of the captions:

- Extreme Violence
- Offensive Language
- Language May Offend
- May Frighten Young Children
- May Offend Some Religious Beliefs
- Not Recommended For Children
- Nude Scenes
- Parental Guidance Recommended
- Some Scenes May Offend
- Violent Scenes
- Not Suitable for Children
- Perversions
- Objectional Material
- Explicit Sex

The following ratings were used from January 1, 1994 to March 31, 2005:

- General (G) – Considered to be suitable for all ages. No restrictions on viewing.
- Parental Guidance (PG) – All ages may attend. However, parents should know that the theme or content of the film may be more mature than in general films. It may be appropriate for those 8 years of age and over. Some titles may carry an additional information caption.
  - Captions for PG:
    - Frightening Scenes
    - Language Warning
    - Mature Theme
- Adult Accompaniment (14) – Considered to be suitable for those 14 years of age and older. Those under 14 must be escorted by an adult.
  - A film with this rating may contain:
    - Scenes of limited violence
    - The use of weapons without excessive blood-letting
    - Restrained portrayal of accident or disaster
    - Scenes of casual or brief nudity, romantic involvement that is not sexually explicit, where participants are at least partially clothed
    - Some coarse or vulgar language
  - Captions for 14:
    - Violent Scenes
    - Nude Scenes
    - Blood Letting
    - Offensive Language
    - Sexual Content
    - Controversial Subject Matter
    - Mature Subject Matter
    - Gory Scenes
- Restricted (18) – Considered to be suitable for those 18 years of age or older. Those under 18 must be escorted by a parent or legal guardian.
  - Films with this rating may contain:
    - Excessive use of foul or offensive language
    - Depictions of extreme violence and horror
    - Graphic sexual activity
  - Captions for 18:
    - Offensive Language Throughout
    - Extreme Violence
    - Explicit Nudity
    - Graphic Sexual Content
    - Controversial Subject Matter
- Explicit Material (XXX)
  - These films contain:
    - Sexually explicit scenes
    - Graphically or excessively violent scenes
  - Captions for XXX:
    - Explicit Sex
    - Excessive Violence
- Exempt (E) – Some types of videos are exempt from classification and will carry an E label. These videos have not been viewed by the Authority. They may include children's cartoons, travelogues, instructional videos, athletic events and cultural, industrial, religious or political material.
- Not Approved (NA) – The Authority may prohibit the display, exhibition, sale, lease, rental, exchange or distribution of a film where the film contains:
  - (a) a graphic or prolonged scene of violence, torture, crime, cruelty, horror or human degradation;
  - (b) the depiction of the physical abuse or humiliation of human beings for the purposes of sexual gratification or as pleasing to the victim;
  - (c) a scene where a person who is or is intended to represent a person under the age of sixteen years appears in a scene of explicit and exploitative sexual activity;
  - (d) a scene depicting indignities to the human body or an animal in an explicit manner.
