= 12 rating =

12 rating refers to a type of age-based content rating that applies to media entertainment, such as films, television shows and computer games. The following articles document the rating across a range of countries and mediums:

== Classification organizations ==
- Brazilian advisory rating system (12)
- British Board of Film Classification (12 and 12A)
- Central Board of Film Certification (UA – 12 equivalent)
- Common Sense Media (12+)
- Computer Entertainment Rating Organization (B – 12 equivalent)
- Dirección General de Radio, Televisión y Cinematografía (B – 12 equivalent)
- Eirin (PG-12)
- Freiwillige Selbstkontrolle der Filmwirtschaft (12)
- Irish Film Classification Office (12 and 12A)
- Korea Media Rating Board (12)
- National Audiovisual Institute (Finland) (12)
- Netherlands Institute for the Classification of Audiovisual Media (12)
- Norwegian Media Authority (12)
- Pan European Game Information (12)
- Unterhaltungssoftware Selbstkontrolle (12)
- General Commission for Audiovisual Media (Saudi Arabia) (12+)

== Systems ==
- Motion picture content rating system, a range of classification systems for films that commonly use the age 12 as part of its regulatory criteria
- Television content rating system, a range of classification systems for television broadcasts that commonly use the age 12 as part of its regulatory criteria
- Video game content rating system, a range of classification systems for video games that commonly use the age 12 as part of its regulatory criteria
- Mobile software content rating system, a range of classification systems for mobile software that commonly use the age 12 as part of its regulatory criteria

== See also ==
- 12A (disambiguation)
- History of British film certificates (PG-12)
- Censorship in France
