= Mobile software content rating system =

Age rating used to classify mobile software

A mobile software content rating system is a rating system which is tailored to users of mobile software.

== Comparison table ==
A comparison of current mobile software rating systems, showing age on the horizontal axis. Note however that the specific criteria used in assigning a classification can vary widely from one country/system to another. Thus a color code or age range cannot be directly compared from one country to another.

Key:

- White – No restrictions: Suitable for all ages / Aimed at young audiences / Exempt / Not rated.
- Yellow – Advisory: Parental guidance is suggested for designated age range.
- Purple – Strong advisory: Not recommended for a younger audience but not restricted.
- Red – Restrictive: Parental supervision required for younger audiences.
- Black – Prohibitive: Exclusively for older audiences / Restricted to licensed apps or regions / Banned.

Explanations of specific ratings are available in corresponding articles.

Country/System	Age rating																						Other
Country/System	0	1	2	3	4	5	6	7	8	9	10	11	12	13	14	15	16	17	18	19	20	21	Other
Apple App Store	—				4+ (aged 5 and under)		4+ (ages 6–8)			4+ (ages 9–11)			—	13+			16+ 17+		18+				No Rating
Apple App Store	—				4+					9+				13+			16+ 17+		18+				No Rating
Australia (ACB)	G															M			R 18+				CTC
Australia (ACB)	PG															MA 15+			R 18+				RC
Brazil (ClassInd)	L						6				10		12		14		16		18				—
Entertainment Software Rating Board (ESRB) Canada Mexico United States	EC										E10+			T				M	AO				RP
Entertainment Software Rating Board (ESRB) Canada Mexico United States	E										E10+			T				M	AO				RP – Likely Mature 17+
Germany (USK)	USK 0						USK 6						USK 12				USK 16		USK 18				Unrated
Germany (USK)	USK 0						USK 6						USK 12				USK 16		No Rating				Confiscated
Germany (USK)	USK 0						USK 6						USK 12				USK 16		Indexed				Confiscated
Indonesia (IGRS)	—			3+				7+						13+		15+			18+				Refused classification
International Age Rating Coalition (IARC)	—			3+				7+					12+				16+		18+				—
Pan-European Game Information (PEGI) Albania Austria Belgium Bosnia and Herzegovina Bulgaria Croatia Cyprus Czech Republic Denmark Estonia Finland France Greece Hungary Iceland Ireland Italy Kosovo Latvia Lithuania Luxembourg Malta Moldova Montenegro Netherlands North Macedonia Norway Poland Portugal Romania Serbia Slovakia Slovenia Spain Sweden Switzerland Turkey Ukraine United Kingdom	—			3				7					12				16		18				!
Saudi Arabia (Gmedia/GAMR)	—			3				7					12				16		18			21	TBC
South Korea (GRAC)	ALL												12			15				19			Refused classification
Taiwan (GSRR)	0+						6+						12+			15+			18+				—
Samsung Galaxy Store	All				4+								12+				16+		18+				Banned
Huawei AppGallery	—			3+				7+					12+				16+		18+				—
Amazon Appstore	All Ages																		Adult				—
Amazon Appstore	Guidance Suggested																		Adult				—
Amazon Appstore	Mature																		Adult				—
Blackberry World	G													T				M	A				—
Common Sense Media	—		2	3	4	5	6	7	8	9	10	11	12	13	14	15	16	17	18				Not Yet Rated
Country/System	0	1	2	3	4	5	6	7	8	9	10	11	12	13	14	15	16	17	18	19	20	21	Other

== Existing systems ==
=== App Store (iOS/iPadOS) ===
Since iOS 26, Apple's rating system for the App Store has followed the following rubric:

Apple App Store (iOS/iPadOS) rating logos since iOS 26
- 4+: Contains no objectionable material. Apps specifically aimed at children can be placed into one of three subcategories: ages 5 and under, 6–8 and 9–11.
- 9+: May contain content unsuitable for children under the age of 9.
- 13+: May contain content unsuitable for children under the age of 13. Replaces the 12+ rating.
- 16+: May contain content unsuitable for children under the age of 16. Replaces the 17+ rating.
- 18+: May contain content unsuitable for children under the age of 18. Replaces the 17+ rating. Apps rated 18+ are restricted in Australia, Brazil, Singapore, and United Kingdom.

Apps rated 17+ were prohibited from purchase by younger users.

=== Google Play ===
Up until March 17, 2015 Google Play used the following rubric:

- Everyone
- Low maturity
- Medium maturity
- High maturity

Google now uses the International Age Rating Coalition (IARC) in most countries not represented by a rating authority, whilst countries or regions with a superimposed video game rating authority continues applying their own ratings where applicable. This includes Americas (except Brazil), where ESRB is imposed, Brazil with ClassInd, Europe and Israel with PEGI, Australia with ACB and South Korea with GRAC. However, a new Google Play Rating system is used exclusively in Russia and for non-gaming apps in South Korea. These ratings include:

- 3+
- 7+
- 12+
- 16+
- 18+

In Australia, IARC applies its own ratings for non-gaming apps.

=== Samsung Galaxy Store ===
The ratings are, All Ages, 4+, 12+, 16+ and 18+. The 18+ rating is enforced and the rest are advisory.

=== Huawei AppGallery ===
Huawei AppGallery developed its own rating system. The ratings are: 3+, 7+ (or 8+ in China), 12+, 16+ and 18+. The AppGallery also self-assigns the content ratings of apps (indicated by the letter "A" preceding the ratings) using the ClassInd rating system for the Brazilian market.

=== Amazon Appstore ===
On the Amazon Appstore, "All Ages" is for all ages. "Guidance Suggested" is for recommendation that parents should give guidance to pre-teens/children. "Mature" is recommended to be suitable for mature and adult audiences. "Adult" is advertisements, graphic violence, nudity or other content only suitable for adult audiences.

=== Blackberry World ===
The Blackberry appstore has the following ratings:

- G (General) – All ages, no bad content
- T (Teen) – May not be suitable for children under the age of 13
- M (Mature) – May not be suitable for children under the age of 17, contains inappropriate content
- A (Adult) – Content that is generally recognized as appropriate only for, or that is legally restricted to, persons at least the age of majority in their region.

=== Common Sense Media ===
Common Sense Media's rating scheme ranges from 2+ to 18+, in one-year increments.

=== ONE store ===
ONE store uses the ONE store Rating Classification for non-game applications distributed in South Korea. The system comprises five age categories: 3+, 7+, 12+, 16+, and 19+. Games are classified separately in accordance with the national game rating system.

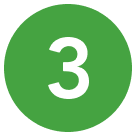
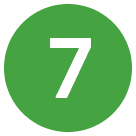
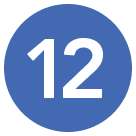
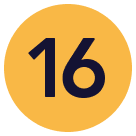
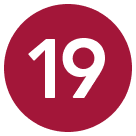
ONE store Rating Classification icons
- 3+: Suitable for all ages. Limited comic or fantasy violence may be present, but profanity is not permitted.
- 7+: May include mildly frightening scenes or sounds, as well as implied or unrealistic mild violence.
- 12+: May contain non-graphic violence, mild language, non-explicit nudity, and simulated gambling. Sexual profanity is not permitted.
- 16+: May include realistic violence, sexual activity, strong language, references to tobacco and drug use, and depictions of criminal activity.
- 19+: May contain graphic violence, sexual violence, explicit sexual content, discriminatory material, and depictions that glorify illegal drug use.

=== RuStore ===
RuStore uses a five-tier age rating system for applications distributed through its platform, comprising 0+, 6+, 12+, 16+, and 18+. Developers assign an age rating during the publication process based on the application's content.

- 0+: Suitable for all audiences. Does not contain violence or objectionable content, although applications with this rating are not necessarily intended for children.
- 6+: May contain limited violence or mildly frightening scenes. Not recommended for children under six years of age.
- 12+: May include moderate violence, frightening scenes, or objectionable content. Not recommended for children under twelve years of age.
- 16+: May contain violence or sexual content. Not recommended for children under sixteen years of age.
- 18+: May include strong violence, sexual content, or references to drugs or alcohol. Intended for adults only.

== See also ==
- Internet Content Rating Association
- Motion picture content rating system
- Television content rating system
- Video game content rating system
