= International Age Rating Coalition =

International media content rating initiative

- Abbreviation: IARC
- Formation: December 2013
- Type: NGO
- Legal status: Company
- Purpose: Classification of digitally delivered video games and apps
- Official languages: Arabic, Chinese, English, French, German, Indonesian, Japanese, Korean, Portuguese, Spanish
- Website: globalratings.com

The International Age Rating Coalition (IARC) is an initiative aimed at streamlining acquisition of content ratings for video games and mobile apps, from authorities of different countries. Introduced in 2013, the IARC system simplifies the process of obtaining ratings by developers, through the use of questionnaires, which assess the content of the product. This new process reduces the costs of video game developers as they seek to obtain ratings for their products that are distributed digitally online. It acts as a mobile software content rating system on several online storefronts.

The effort was created through a coalition of rating authorities from around the world, including ESRB in North America, PEGI in Europe, USK in Germany, ClassInd in Brazil, and the Australian Classification Board, and first announced by PEGI's MD at the 2013 London Games Conference. In August 2014, the Australian Classification Board introduced amendments to allow for the automated classification process employed by the IARC. On 19 December 2017, South Korea's Game Rating and Administration Committee (GRAC) became a member. In 2023, IARC partnered with the Taipei Computer Association (TCA) to provide age ratings for the Taiwanese market using the government's Taiwan Entertainment Software Rating Information (TESRI) age rating system and became a member the same year. In 2024, both Indonesia’s Indonesia Game Rating System (IGRS) and Saudi Arabia’s General Authority of Media Regulation (Gmedia/GAMR) became members of IARC.

== Adoption ==
It is similar to the previous "Short Form" application of the ESRB. The Firefox Marketplace was the first storefront to adopt the system in 2014. Google Play for Android devices adopted the rating system in March 2015. In October 2015, Nintendo became the first console manufacturer to adopt IARC, specifically for their Nintendo eShop service. In January 2017, the Oculus Store (now known as Meta Horizon Store) has integrated IARC's age rating process for all developers moving forward, including retroactively for previously released games and apps. In 2018, it was reported that the Microsoft Store had adopted it, with PlayStation Store planning to later on. In 2023, Epic Games has partnered with IARC, assisting developers to self-publish onto their Epic Games Store service with required age ratings, and later that same year extended IARC's rating process to user-generated content in Fortnite.

In 2019, Wired reported that content inappropriate for children rated via IARC self questionnaires was available on Google Play. Google said it removes content inappropriately rated.

Participating Storefronts:

- Epic Games Store
- Facebook Gaming
- Fortnite
- Google Play
- Amazon Luna
- Meta Horizon Store
- Microsoft Store for Windows and Xbox
- Nintendo eShop
- ONE Store
- Pico Store
- PlayStation Store

== Comparison table ==
A comparison of participants, showing age on the horizontal axis. Note however that the specific criteria used in assigning a classification can vary widely from one country to another. Thus a color code or age range cannot be directly compared from one country to another.

Key:

- White – No restrictions: Suitable for all ages / Aimed at young audiences / Exempt / Not rated.
- Yellow – Advisory: Parental guidance is suggested for designated age range.
- Purple – Strong advisory: Not recommended for a younger audience but not restricted.
- Red – Restrictive: Parental accompaniment required for younger audiences.
- Black – Prohibitive: Exclusively for older audiences / Restricted to licensed premises / Banned.

Explanations of specific ratings are available in corresponding articles.

Region/Participant	Age rating																						Other
Region/Participant	0	1	2	3	4	5	6	7	8	9	10	11	12	13	14	15	16	17	18	19	20	21	Other
Australia (ACB)	G															M			R 18+				CTC
Australia (ACB)	PG															MA 15+			R 18+				RC
Brazil (ClassInd)	L						6				10		12		14		16		18				—
Entertainment Software Rating Board (ESRB) Canada United States	EC										E10+			T				M	AO				RP
Entertainment Software Rating Board (ESRB) Canada United States	E										E10+			T				M	AO				RP – Likely Mature 17+
Germany (USK)	USK 0						USK 6						USK 12				USK 16		USK 18				Unrated
Germany (USK)	USK 0						USK 6						USK 12				USK 16		No Rating				Confiscated
Germany (USK)	USK 0						USK 6						USK 12				USK 16		Indexed				Confiscated
Indonesia (IGRS)	—			3+				7+						13+		15+			18+				Refused classification
Pan-European Game Information (PEGI) Albania Austria Belgium Bosnia and Herzegovina Bulgaria Croatia Cyprus Czech Republic Denmark Estonia Finland France Greece Hungary Iceland Ireland Italy Kosovo Latvia Lithuania Luxembourg Malta Moldova Montenegro Netherlands North Macedonia Norway Poland Portugal Romania Serbia Slovakia Slovenia Spain Sweden Switzerland Turkey Ukraine United Kingdom	—			3				7					12				16		18				!
Saudi Arabia (Gmedia/GAMR)	—			3				7					12				16		18			21	TBC
South Korea (GRAC)	ALL												12			15				19			Refused classification
Taiwan (GSRR)	0+						6+						12+			15+			18+				—
Unrepresented countries	—			3+				7+					12+				16+		18+				—
Region/Participant	0	1	2	3	4	5	6	7	8	9	10	11	12	13	14	15	16	17	18	19	20	21	Other

== IARC generic rating system ==
In addition to obtaining official age ratings from coalition members, developers who apply through IARC’s process also receive a complimentary generic age rating for their software under IARC’s name, usable across participating digital storefronts. These generic ratings apply to territories that lack their own rating systems or are not formally supported by existing age rating bodies, including regions where a local rating authority exists but is not yet part of the IARC system.

Icon	Rating	Description
	3+	Suitable for all age groups. Some violence in a comical or fantasy context is acceptable. Bad language is not permitted.
	7+	May contain some scenes or sounds that are frightening for children. Mild violence (implied or non-realistic) is permitted.
	12+	Violence involving fantasy characters and/or non-graphic violence involving human-looking characters or animals is permitted. Non-graphic nudity, mild language and simulated gambling are also permitted, but sexual expletives are not.
	16+	Realistic violence, sexual activity, strong language, use of tobacco and drugs, and the depiction of criminal activities are permitted.
	18+	Graphic violence, including depictions lacking motive and/or directed towards defenseless characters, and sexual violence are permitted. May also include graphic sexual content, discriminatory acts and/or the glamorization of illegal drug use.

== See also ==
- Video game content rating system
