= Parental Guidance Suggested =

Parental Guidance Suggested may refer to:

- PG rating (disambiguation), in several countries, a content rating for film, television, and other media
- Parental Guidance Suggested (2008 film), or Extreme Movie, an American satirical sex comedy
- "Parental Guidance Suggested" (NCIS), a 2014 TV episode

== See also ==
- Parental Guidance (disambiguation)
