= Computer Entertainment Rating Organization =

Japanese video game age rating organization

- Type: Nonprofit organization
- Industry: Video game content rating system
- Founded: 5 June 2002; 24 years ago
- Headquarters: Chiyoda, Tokyo, Japan
- Area served: Japan
- Key people: Kazuya Watanabe
- Website: www.cero.gr.jp

The Computer Entertainment Rating Organization (Japanese: 特定非営利活動法人コンピュータエンターテインメントレーティング機構, Hepburn: Tokutei Hieiri Katsudō Hōjin Konpyūta Entāteinmento Rētingu Kikō) (CERO (セロ, Sero)) is a Japanese entertainment rating organization based in Tokyo that rates video game content in console games with levels of ratings that inform the customer of the nature of the product and what age group it is suitable for. It was established on 5 June 2002 as a branch of Computer Entertainment Supplier's Association, and became an officially recognized nonprofit organization under Japanese law in December 2003.

== CERO rating marks ==
On March 1, 2006, CERO implemented the latest revision of its rating system. The symbols that CERO uses are stylized Latin letters, named after academic grading, except "F" is replaced with "Z". Each is meant to convey a game's suitability for minors. "CERO rating marks" are grouped broadly into "age classification marks" and "other marks". Age classification marks include the following five marks. One of the marks is indicated on the left bottom of the game box front, and a corresponding color bar is also shown on the box spine. (Bar colors: black for "A"; green for "B"; blue for "C"; orange for "D"; red for "Z")

Mark	Rating	Description
	All Ages (全年齢対象, Zen nenrei taishō)	Expressions and content subjected to age-specific limitation are not included in the game, thereby being suitable for all ages.
	Ages 12 and up (12才以上対象, Jūnisai ijō taishō)	Expression and content suitable only to 12-years-olds and above are included in the game.
	Ages 15 and up (15才以上対象, Jūgosai ijō taishō)	Expression and content suitable only to 15-years-olds and above are included in the game.
	Ages 17 and up (17才以上対象, Jūnanasai ijō taishō)	Expression and content suitable only to 17-years-olds and above are included in the game.
	Ages 18 and up only (18才以上のみ対象, Jūhassai ijō nomi taishō)	Expression and content suitable only to 18-years-olds and above are included in the game. (This assumes that the game should not be sold or distributed to those younger than 18 years old.)
	Educational/Database (教育・データベース, Kyouiku Deetabeesu)	A special rating applied only to non-game, educational/utility software (e.g. books) released on consoles aimed to older audiences (games like this aimed to children are rated A instead). Despite having education in its name, it can still feature expressions and content that might not be suitable for minors.
	CERO Regulations-Compatible (規定適合, Kitei tekigō)	Applied only to trial versions of games. Titles with this rating do not have all of the expressions and content featured in the full game.
	Rating Scheduled (審査予定, Shinsa yotei)	The game has not been assigned its final rating. Used in trailers and advertisements for games that have not been assigned their final rating from CERO.

=== Content icons ===
In April 2004, CERO defined the following "content icons". Content icons represent that the age classification decision has been made based on the expressions belonging to one (or more) of the content icons. They are grouped into nine categories. These icons are displayed on the back of all game boxes except on those rated "A" or "Educational/Database".

Icon	Name	Description
	Love	Contains expressions of romance or love. (Possibly includes kissing, hugging, dating, and other expressions of romantic desire or relations.)
	Sexual Content	Contains expressions of sexual relations and/or sexual activity. (Possibly includes swimwear or suggestive outfits, exposure of underwear, partial nudity, suggestive behavior, immoral thoughts, prostitution, sexual contact and/or activities, and other sexual content.)
	Violence	Contains violent activity. (Possibly includes fighting, bodily harm and wounding, killing, dismemberment, depiction of corpses, blood and gore, and other violent content.)
	Horror	Contains frightful or horror elements. (Possibly includes traditional horror characters such as ghosts, zombies, vampires, or other elements of the occult, as well as moments designed to frighten. Usually used to designate games that may scare children, the Horror icon might not be found on frightening games outside of lower age ratings, even in games that fall into the horror genre.)
	Drinking/Smoking	Contains depictions or references to the consumption of alcohol and/or cigarette or cigar smoking.
	Gambling	Contains illegal gambling activities, either by depiction or in interactive form.
	Crime	Contains criminal activity, either by depiction or in interactive form. (Possibly includes illegal activity, dangerous and unlawful behavior, abusive behavior, rape, organized crime, and other criminal acts.)
	Drugs	Contains depictions or references to the use of drugs and illegal narcotics.
	Language	Contains profane, derogatory, or bigoted language.

=== Former ratings ===
Mark	Rating
	All Ages (全年齢対象, Zen nenrei taishō)
	Ages 12 and up (12才以上対象, Jūnisai ijō taishō)
	Ages 15 and up (15才以上対象, Jūgosai ijō taishō)
	Ages 18 and up (18才以上対象, Jūhassai ijō taishō)

Before March 1, 2006, the former four ratings were all advisory. Until concerns had been raised to the game Capcom released on Japan Grand Theft Auto III, which was then banned from being sold to anyone under 18 in two separate prefectures. As a result, which Capcom vigorously contested, the Japanese trade organization CESA (Computer Entertainment Supplier's Association) suggested a voluntary program to prevent the sale of games rated 18 to minors. The ratings were renamed to letters, the D rating was made and Z became restrictive. CERO also revised its criteria to be stricter, causing contents that used to be allowed at a lower rating to receive a higher rating. (Note: Sly Cooper's games Thievius Raccoonus and Band of Thieves were rated All. They got re-rated as B with a crime icon as the collection of the trilogy that was released on January 27, 2011 for PlayStation 3 in Japan. Most likely because of the stealing mechanics.) (Note: Super Mario Odyssey is the first game of the series to receive a higher rating. It was rated B with a violence and crime icon. Producer Yoshiaki Koizumi commented on the rating increase, stating: "Fundamentally, we designed the game so that people of all generations could enjoy it, and we certainly didn't intend to create anything dangerous. It is likely that actions which were acceptable in previous titles simply feel more intense or nerve-wracking when placed against a realistic backdrop such as the lifelike world of New Donk City".)

== Rating process ==
According to Kazuya Watanabe, CERO's senior director, the group of assessors is composed of five regular people unaffiliated with the game industry. They are trained by rating past games. The rating process is determined by 30 different expressions, each with an upper limit. The expressions that exceed the upper limit are designated as "banned expressions". In addition, six expressions are not allowed and are also considered to be banned expressions. The expressions are categorized into four different types: "Sex-related expression type" (Love, Sexual Content), "Violence expression type" (Violence, Horror), "Antisocial act expression type" (Drinking/Smoking, Gambling, Crime, Drugs), and "Language and ideology-related expression type" (Language). Each expression is rated using the A to Z scale that the rating marks use. After the group evaluates the game, the results are sent to CERO's main office where the final rating attempts to use the majority of the evaluators' ratings.

It is not mandatory for digital console games to receive a CERO rating. However, Japanese Sony Interactive Entertainment still demands for the rating. On 9 June 2025, Microsoft announced via Xbox Live Japan that Gears of War: Reloaded, the remaster of its first game, will not get a Japanese PlayStation 5 release. According to Microsoft, it's due to the "regional rating restrictions" and "platform policies". Although Sony accepted International Age Rating Coalition ratings on PlayStation Store on 10 March 2022, it still demands a CERO rating for titles rated 18+ as a measure to protect the youth.

== Controversies and criticisms ==
=== Misrating ===
One month after the initial release of Atelier Meruru: The Apprentice of Arland, shipments of it were halted due to it having been misrated. It was re-released a few days later with a B rating from CERO. Its A (All Ages) rating was revoked and it was given a B (Ages 12+) rating instead, due to some suggestive themes featured in the game. The game was originally rated for all ages due to Gust allegedly not providing them with the complete content of the game for them to review.

=== Strict criteria ===
CERO has been criticized for being stricter on content in games when compared to other video game rating boards. CERO's criteria consist of refusing to rate games that have "banned expressions", which means that such expressions are not allowed even at the highest rating Z. A 2020 example being The Last of Us Part II. The game's sexual content, where a sex scene that is featured in the game was censored. In the Japanese version, the scene cuts out just a short time after both characters begin kissing, removing the nudity seen in other versions of the game. The game also received heavy censorship of its violence, as most of the gore and dismemberment seen in the game was removed in the Japanese version.

The Callisto Protocol's Japanese release was canceled when the game did not receive a CERO rating due to the game's violent content, and the developer refused to make any necessary changes.

In a 2015 compilation of columns that he wrote for Famitsu magazine, video game developer and Super Smash Bros. series creator Masahiro Sakurai criticized CERO for having stricter standards on sexual content than violence, citing conflicts that he had with the board over the character models for Palutena and Wonder Pink in Super Smash Bros. for Nintendo 3DS and Wii U. According to Sakurai, the game was nearly delayed due to the developers needing to constantly revise the characters' models, which CERO considered "sexually provocative" due to the possibility that players could take upskirt shots with them. Sakurai claimed that these designs were never intended to be titillating, deriding CERO's demands as "ridiculous and frankly quite juvenile."

Masahiro Sakurai expressed negative thoughts about Super Mario Odyssey's B rating. While he suggested that the rating might stem from the violence or interference directed at realistic characters and environments, such as those found in New Donk City, he notes that the content is comparable to Pixar films and hardly unsuitable for children. He questioned who actually benefits from such a rating, arguing it does not serve children, parents, retailers, Nintendo, or the industry and lamented that players find the classification out of touch, resulting in a situation where a high-quality game fails to reach its intended audience simply because of rigid rules.

== See also ==
- Film Classification and Rating Organization – The Japanese rating system for films.
- Video game content rating system
