= Italian ratings =

Italian ratings may refer to:

- Motion picture rating system in Italy
- Television content rating systems used in Italy
