= IGRS =

IGRS may refer to:

- Indonesia Game Rating System
- Irish Genealogical Research Society
