= Parental Guidance =

Parental Guidance may refer to:

- PG rating (disambiguation), in several countries, a content rating for film, television, and other media
- Parental Guidance (film), a 2012 American family comedy
- Parental Guidance (Singaporean TV series), a 2007–2008 Singaporean drama
- Parental Guidance (Australian TV series), an Australian parenting reality television series
- "Parental Guidance" (Black-ish), a 2015 TV episode
- "Parental Guidance" (Live with Yourself!), a webtoon storyline
- Parental Guidance (album), a 2000 album by Edmond Leung
- "Parental Guidance", a 1986 song by Judas Priest from Turbo

== See also ==
- Parental Guidance Suggested (disambiguation)
