= PG =

PG, P.G., P&G, pg, or Pg, or similar, may refer to:

- Parental Guidance (PG), a content rating in the following motion picture content rating systems and television content rating systems:
  - Australian Classification Board
  - Film Censorship Board in Barbados
  - Canadian motion picture rating system/Canadian Home Video Rating System
  - Canadian TV Classification System
  - Cook Islands Censorship Office
  - Hong Kong television rating system
  - Irish Film Classification Office
  - Jamaican motion picture rating system
  - Kenya Film Classification Board
  - Censor Board Committee in Kuwait
  - Lebanese Censorship Board
  - National Bureau of Classification in the Maldives
  - Film Board in Malta
  - Film Classification Board in Mauritius
  - Classification Office (New Zealand)
  - New Zealand television rating system
  - National Film and Video Censors Board in Nigeria
  - Movie and Television Review and Classification Board in the Philippines
  - General Commission for Audiovisual Media in Saudi Arabia
  - Board of Film Censors in Singapore
  - Singaporean television rating system
  - Film and Publication Board in South Africa
  - National Media Council (United Arab Emirates)
  - British Board of Film Classification
  - Motion Picture Association in the United States
  - TV Parental Guidelines in the United States (TV-PG)

== Businesses and organisations ==
- P.G. Cigars, a cigar brand named after Paul Garmirian
- PG Tips, a British brand of tea
- Bangkok Airways, a Thai regional airline, IATA airline designator PG
- Procter & Gamble (P&G), an American multi-national consumer goods corporation
- Left Party (France) (Parti de gauche), a French democratic socialist political party
- Partido Galeguista (1931), a Galician nationalist political party in Galicia, Spain
- Partido Galeguista (1978), a Galician nationalist political party in Galicia, Spain
- Peoples Gazette, a Nigerian online newspaper
- Petrokimia Gresik, an Indonesian fertilizer company
- PlatinumGames, a Japanese video game developer
- Porter-Gaud School, Charleston, South Carolina, U.S.

== People ==
- PG, student in a postgraduate year after high school (secondary school)
- P.G., Brazilian musician and singer who performed with the band Oficina G3
- P.G. Sittenfeld (born 1984), American politician
- P. G. Wodehouse, English author and humorist
- Peter Gabriel, English musician and songwriter

== Places ==
- Papua New Guinea (ISO 3166-1 country code PG)
- Pauri Garhwal district, a district in the state of Uttarakhand, India
- Podgorica, Montenegro, vehicle licence plate code PG
- Prince George, British Columbia, Canada
- Prince George's County, Maryland, or PG County, U.S.

== Science, technology and mathematics ==
- Polygalacturonase, an enzyme
- Propylene glycol, an organic compound
- Prostaglandin, physiologically active lipid compounds
- PG(n,q), a projective space of Galois geometry
- pg (Unix), a Unix system command (a terminal pager)
- Paleogene (Pg), a geologic period and system
- Panzergewinde, a technical standard for screw threads
- Petagram (Pg), 10^{15} grams, an SI unit of mass
- Picogram (pg), 10^{−12} grams, an SI unit of mass
- PostgreSQL, a free and open-source relational database management system

== Other uses ==
- Pacific Games, multi-sporting event in Oceania
- Page (paper), one side of a sheet of paper, as in a book
- Patrologia Graeca, a collection of writings by Christian Church Fathers
- Point guard, one of the five positions in basketball
- Project Gutenberg, a volunteer effort to digitize and archive cultural works
- iPhrothiya yeGolide, a South African military decoration
- PG: Psycho Goreman, a 2020 Canadian horror comedy film
- Rated PG (album), a compilation album by musician Peter Gabriel
- A US Navy hull classification symbol: Patrol gunboat (PG)
- Highland Papua (vehicle registration prefix PG)
