= 12A =

12A may refer to:

- Media content ratings including the following:
  - 12A, a current certificate issued by the British Board of Film Classification
  - 12A issued by the Irish Film Classification Office
  - 12A issued in Malta and Nigeria, documented at Motion picture content rating system
- A type of Mazda Wankel engine
- Any of the several highways numbered 12A
- Refrigerant HC-12a consisting of propane and isobutane, a replacement for R-12
