= List of highways numbered 12A =

The following highways are numbered 12A:

== India ==
- National Highway 12A (India)

== United States ==
- New England Interstate Route 12A (former)
- County Road 12A (Gadsden County, Florida)
  - County Road 12A (Liberty County, Florida)
- Nebraska Spur 12A
- New Hampshire Route 12A
- County Route 12A (Monmouth County, New Jersey)
- New York State Route 12A
  - County Route 12A (Chenango County, New York)
- Vermont Route 12A
- Secondary State Highway 12A (Washington) (former)
