= Game Rating and Administration Committee =

South Korean video game content rating board

- 게임물관리위원회

Video game content rating body overview
- Formed: 2006 (as Game Rating Board)
- Jurisdiction: South Korea
- Headquarters: Busan, South Korea
- Website: www.grac.or.kr

Korean name
- Hangul: 게임물관리위원회
- Hanja: 게임物管理委員會
- RR: Geimmul gwalli wiwonhoe
- MR: Keimmul kwalli wiwŏnhoe

The Game Rating and Administration Committee (GRAC; Korean: 게임물관리위원회), formerly the Game Rating Board (GRB; Korean: 게임물등급위원회) until December 23, 2013, is a South Korean video game content rating board. A governmental organization, the GRAC rates video games to inform customers of the nature of game contents.

== History ==
Prior to the foundation of GRB, the Korea Media Rating Board rated video games like most other entertainment media. In 2006, the controversies surrounding the arcade gambling game Sea Story, which the Korea Media Rating Board found suitable for all-age, lead to allegations of misconduct. The Korean government responded by creating the GRB in 2006 and making it the only rating organization for rating video games in South Korea.

The GRAC has been criticized as one of the elements of the Internet censorship in South Korea, and is seen as similar to how censorship in China is carried out. By law, games sold in the country must be rated by GRAC prior to sale; additional regulations stipulate age and real name verification for certain mature-audience titles, as well as regulations on location-based games.

In October 2022, the GRAC's sudden decision to raise the age rating of video games was accused of being an illegitimate policy, leading to an audit of the board suggested by Democratic Party politician Lee Sang-heon.

== Age rating symbol ==
The GRAC currently uses four different age ratings.

| Rating | Description |
|---|---|
| | ALL: Titles rated ALL have content that may be suitable for all ages.: The content of the game offers educational, or cultivating moral character and sentiments for children.; The content of the game has no representation of anti-societal idea, distortion or profanity of religion and public morals that harm children emotionally and physically.; The content and motif of the game have no representation of obscenity, violence, or reproduction of gambling spirit that harms children at all. |
| | 12+: Titles rated 12+ have content that may be suitable for ages 12 and older.: The content of the game may have representations of anti-societal idea, distortion or profanity of religion and public morals that would be harmful to children under 12 emotionally and physically.; The content and motif of the game may have representations of obscenity, violence, reproduction of gambling spirit that would be harmful to children under 12 (slight level of sexuality, violence, improper language (expletives), etc.). |
| | 15+: Titles rated 15+ have content that may be suitable for ages 15 and older.: The content of the game may have representations of anti-societal idea, distortion or profanity of religion and public morals that would be harmful to children under 15 emotionally and physically.; The content and motif of the game may have representations of obscenity, violence, speculation, etc. that would be harmful to children under 15 (indirect and restricted representation of sexuality, violence, improper language (expletives) and low level of reproduction of gambling spirit (arousing of passion for excessive use of gaming money, or dependence on one's luck). |
| | 19+: Titles rated 19+ have content prohibited to people who have not yet reached 1 January of the year they reach 19-year-old birthday. People, who have reached 1 January of the year they reach 19-year-old birthday, can access that content even they are 18.: The content of the game may have representations of anti-societal idea, distortion or profanity of religion and public morals that would be harmful to minors emotionally and physically.; The content and motif of the game may have representations of obscenity, violence, speculation, etc. that would be harmful to minors (direct and concrete graphical representation of sexuality, violence, improper language (expletives), reproduction of gambling spirit (existence of arousing of passion of excessive use of gaming money, or dependence on one's luck, but no real gain or loss of one's asset). |
| | TESTING: Game contents for testing with GRAC's permission before general release.: The game is either being demonstrated, or the rating is pending. |

== Former rating ==
| Rating | Description |
|---|---|
| | 18+: Titles rated 18+ have content restricted for ages 18 and older.: The content of the game may have representations of anti-societal idea, distortion or profanity of religion and public morals that would be harmful to minors emotionally and physically.; The content and motif of the game may have representations of obscenity, violence, speculation, etc. that would be harmful to minors (direct and concrete graphical representation of sexuality, violence, improper language (expletives), reproduction of gambling spirit (existence of arousing of passion of excessive use of gaming money, or dependence on one's luck, but no real gain or loss of one's asset). This rating was withdrawn and replaced by the 19 rating in 2024. (For new classifications issued, this change took effect from January 9, 2024. On July 1, 2024, all games which had previously been issued 18 ratings, had their former certification withdrawn and raised to 19). |

== Content descriptors ==
Content descriptors
| Icon | Content descriptor | Description | Ratings |
|---|---|---|---|
| | Sexuality | Contains references or explicit depictions of sexual behavior, possibly including nudity. | |
| | Violence | Contains references or scenes involving aggressive conflict, may contain blood scenes (realistic blood, gore, weapons, and depictions of human injury and death)/PvP or PK. | |
| | Fear, Horror, Threatening | Contains references or depictions of horrifying action. | |
| | Language | Contains references or explicit depictions of inappropriate language. (sexual, problematic social messages, abusive language, etc.) | |
| | Alcohol, Tobacco, Drug | Contains references or images of alcoholic beverages, tobacco products, and/or illegal drug use. | |
| | Crime, Anti-societal | Contains references or images of crime, anti-societal, and/or anti-governmental messages. | |
| | Gambling | Contains references to gambling or betting (speculation), and/or simulated gambling. | |

== See also ==
- Video game content rating system
