= Korea Media Rating Board =

Motion picture rating organization

- 영상물등급위원회
- Official KMRB logo as of February 2020

Film content rating body overview
- Formed: 1966 (as the Korean Art and Culture Ethics Committee)
- Jurisdiction: South Korea
- Headquarters: Busan, South Korea
- Website: www.kmrb.or.kr

Korean name
- Hangul: 영상물등급위원회
- Hanja: 映像物等級委員會
- RR: Yeongsangmul deunggeup wiwonhoe
- MR: Yŏngsangmul tŭnggŭp wiwŏnhoe

The Korea Media Rating Board (Korean: 영상물등급위원회; KMRB) is a public organization that classifies films, videos, and other motion pictures into age-based ratings and recommends domestic performances of foreign artists. Through these rating systems, the Korea Media Rating Board provides domestic viewers with accurate information for their viewing and protects children from harmful and unsuitable materials.

Established in 1966 as the "Korean Art and Culture Ethics Committee", the organization changed the name to the "Korean Ethics Committee for Performing Arts" in 1976 and The "Korean Council Performing Arts Promotion" in 1997. In June 1999, it finally changed to the current name of "Korea Media Rating Board".

== Ratings ==
Ratings are determined on films and videos which are classified, stage performances, and advertising. Stage performances have been rated ALL, Teenager restricted, or not rated. Advertisements have generally been rated ALL or not rated. The media that is rated includes:

- Nationally produced movies
- Foreign movies
- Advertisements on:
  - previews
  - posters
  - newspapers
  - notice boards

=== Film ratings ===
KMRB ratings since the start of 2021 and changed from 18 to 19 since May 1, 2024

The Korea Media Rating Board (영상물등급위원회) in Busan divides licensed films into the following categories:

- ALL (전체관람가 - meaning "all") – Green label: Film suitable for all ages.
- 12 (12세이상관람가 - meaning "over 12 years") – Yellow label: Film intended for audiences 12 and over. Underage audiences accompanied by a parent or guardian are allowed.
- 15 (15세이상관람가 - meaning "over 15 years") – Orange label: Film intended for audiences 15 and over. Underage audiences accompanied by a parent or guardian are allowed.
- 19 (청소년관람불가 - meaning "not for young people") – Red label: No one under 19 is allowed to watch this film.
- Restricted screening (제한상영가 - meaning "limited screening") – White label: Film needs a certain restriction in screening or advertisement as it is considered a highly bad influence to universal human dignity, social value, good customs or national emotion due to excessive expression of nudity, violence, social behavior, etc.

On January 1, 2021, the KMRB updated their maturity icons.

Classification ratings are determined by the following:

- Theme (주제) - The effect on the formation emotions, values of group of age as well as the ability to understand and accept the theme.
- Sex and Nudity (선정성) - Level of exposure of human body as well as caress, sexual intercourse and other sexual activities.
- Violence (폭력성) - Level of damage to human body and oppression through torture and blood battles, pain, indignity and sexual violence.
- Language (대사) - Level and frequency of vulgar language and slangs.
- Horror (공포) - Level of psychological shock resulting from tension, stimuli and threat.
- Drugs (약물) - Level of drugs use and promotion or glamorization of such activities.
- Imitative Behavior (모방위험) - Level of imitation, encouragement and stimulus to perform the expressed act of murder, drug, suicide, school violence and out casting and use of weapons.

Former rating

- 18 (청소년관람불가 - meaning "not for young people") – Red label: No one under 18 is allowed to watch this film. This rating was replaced by 19 on May 1, 2024.

== See also ==
- Game Rating and Administration Committee – game rating organization that separated from KMRB
- Motion picture rating system
