= Game Software Rating Regulations =

Taiwanese video game content rating system

- Type: Incentive
- Founded: July 6, 2006; 20 years ago
- Headquarters: Taiwan
- Number of locations: Southeast Asia
- Area served: Hong Kong

Game Software Rating Regulations
- Traditional Chinese: 遊戲軟體分級管理辦法
- Simplified Chinese: 游戏软体分级管理办法
Transcriptions
Standard Mandarin
- Hanyu Pinyin: Yóuxì ruǎntǐ fēnjí guǎnlǐ bànfǎ
Southern Min
- Hokkien POJ: Iû-hì nńg-thé hun-kip koán-lí pān-hoat

Game Software Rating Regulations (Chinese: 遊戲軟體分級管理辦法), also translated as Game Software Rating Management Regulations or Taiwan Entertainment Software Rating Information (TESRI), is the official video game content rating system used in Taiwan, and a de facto rating system for the Hong Kong and Southeast Asia markets. The rating system was established on July 6, 2006, and changed to its current style on May 29, 2012.

== Ratings ==
Currently, the system uses five ratings:

Logo	Rating	Chinese	Taiwanese	Hakka	Description
	General Public (G)	普遍級	Phó͘-phiàn Kip	Phû-phiên Kip	All ages may use such software.: There are no scenes of nudity, violence, blood, horror, inappropriate language, and inappropriate behavior.; Use of virtual currency or game results do not directly affect the increase or decrease of virtual currency in the game.
	Protected (P)	保護級	Pó-hō͘ Kip	Pó-fu Kip	Only persons of age 6 and above may use such software.: Cartoon characters fighting, and no depictions of character casualties and bloody details.
	Parental Guidance 12 (PG 12)	輔12級	Hù 12 Kip	Phú 12 Kip	Only persons of age 12 and above may use such software.: Suggestive themes.; No bloody fights and horrifying scenes.; Scenes with general obscene speech but no crude language.; Game design that promotes virtual love and marriage.; Use of virtual currency or game results do not directly affect the increase or decrease of virtual currency in card and puzzle entertainment games.
	Parental Guidance 15 (PG 15)	輔15級	Hù 15 Kip	Phú 15 Kip	Only persons of age 15 and above may use such software.: A character is naked with no obscene details, the naked back is shown, a character is naked from a distance, and/or strong sexual references.; Bloody, cruel, and/or horrible scenes that are not graphic.; Contains crude language.; Encourages the use of alcohol and/or tobacco.; Virtual game currency will increase or decrease due to game results, such as chess, cards, and puzzle entertainment games (for example: black jack, chess, mahjong, poker, slot machines, etc.).
	Restricted (R)	限制級	Hān-chè Kip	Han-chṳ Kip	Only persons of age 18 and above may use such software.: Full nudity, and/or sex scenes.; Bloody, cruel, and/or terrifying scenes that are graphic.; Use of drugs, repeated hate speech, anti-social behavior, and/or other inappropriate behaviors.

=== Former ratings ===
Logo	Rating	Chinese	Taiwanese	Hakka	Description
	General Public (G)	普遍級	Phó͘-phiàn Kip	Phû-phiên Kip	All ages may use such software.
	Protected (P)	保護級	Pó-hō͘ Kip	Pó-fu Kip	Only persons of age 6 and above may use such software.
	Parental Guidance 12 (PG 12)	輔12級	Hù 12 Kip	Phú 12 Kip	Only persons of age 12 and above may use such software. Parental or teacher guidance is demanded for those aged 12-17.
	Restricted (R)	限制級	Hān-chè Kip	Han-chṳ Kip	Only persons of age 18 and above may use such software.

The four ratings were used when the organization was first established until May 29, 2012. The Parental Guidance rating was split into the two currently ratings: PG 12 and PG 15.

== See also ==
- Video games in Taiwan
