= Television content rating system =

Rating systems for network and broadcast television

Television content rating systems are systems for evaluating the content and reporting the suitability of television programmes for minors. Many countries have their own television rating system and countries' rating processes vary by local priorities. Programmes are rated by the organisation that manages the system, the broadcaster, or the content producers.

A rating is usually set for each individual episode of a television series. The rating can change per episode, network, rerun, and country. As such, programme ratings are usually not meaningful unless when and where the rating is used is mentioned.

== Comparison table ==
A comparison of current television content rating systems, showing age on the horizontal axis. Note however that the specific criteria used in assigning a classification can vary widely from one country to another. Thus a colour code or age range cannot be directly compared from one country to another.

Key:

- White – No restrictions: Suitable for all ages / Aimed at young audiences / Exempt / Not rated.
- Yellow – Advisory: Parental guidance is suggested for designated age range.
- Purple – Strong advisory: Not recommended for a younger audience but not restricted.
- Red – Restrictive: Parental accompaniment required for younger audiences.
- Black – Prohibitive: Exclusively for older audiences / Restricted to a specific audience / Banned (content is usually locked by a password).

Country	Age rating																						Other
Country	0	1	2	3	4	5	6	7	8	9	10	11	12	13	14	15	16	17	18	19	20	21	Other
Australia	P					C										M			R 18+				E
Australia	G															MA 15+			X 18+				E
Australia	PG															MA 15+			X 18+				E
Brazil	L						6				10		12		14		16		18				—
Brazil	AL						A6				A10		A12		A14		A16		A18				—
Canada (English)	C								C8						14+				18+				E
Canada (English)	G								PG						14+				18+				E
Quebec (French)	G								8+					13+			16+		18+				E
Colombia	Children												Teenager						Adults				—
Colombia	Family																		Adults				—
Denmark	A							7				11				15							—
Ecuador	A																		C				—
Ecuador	B																		C				—
Finland	S/T							7					12				16		18				—
France	Unrated										10+		12+				16+		18+				—
Germany (Public broadcasting)	Unrated																16		18				—
(Commercial broadcasting)	FSF 0						FSF 6						FSF 12 (day time)				FSF 16		FSF 18				X
(Commercial broadcasting)	FSF 0						FSF 6						FSF 12 (prime time)				FSF 16		FSF 18				X
Ghana	U												12+			15+			18+				NS
Ghana	PG												12+			15+			18+				NS
Greece	K								8				12				16		18				—
Hong Kong	Unrated																		M				—
Hong Kong	PG																		M				—
Indonesia	—		SU																D				—
Indonesia	—		P					A						R					D				—
Indonesia	—		P–BO					A–BO						R–BO					D				—
Mexico	AA							A					B			B-15			C				—
Mexico	AA							A					B			B-15			D				—
Morocco	All audiences										–10		–12				–16						—
Netherlands	AL						6			9			12		14		16		18				—
New Zealand	G																M		18				—
New Zealand	PG																16		18				—
North Macedonia	[Green circle]								[Yellow circle]				[Orange square]				[Blue triangle]		X18+				—
Norway	A						6			9			12			15			18				—
Philippines	G																						—
Philippines	PG																						—
Philippines	SPG																						—
Poland	BOW							7					12				16		[Key symbol]				—
Portugal	T										10AP		12AP				16						—
Romania	Unrated						AP						12			15			18				—
Russia	0+						6+						12+				16+		18+				—
Singapore	G													PG13			NC16		M18			R21	—
Singapore	PG													PG13			NC16		M18			R21	—
Slovakia	[Teddy bear's head]												12			15			18				—
Slovakia	U							7					12			15			18				—
Slovenia	Unrated												12			15			18				—
Slovenia	VS												12			15			18+				—
Slovenia	VS												12			15			18++				—
South Korea	All							7					12			15				19			Exempt
Spain	ERI							7					12				16		18				X
Spain	TP							7					12				16		18				X
Catalonia	ERI							7			10			13					18				—
Catalonia	Per a tothom							7			10			13					18				—
Thailand	Preschool						Children							PG 13					PG 18		Adults		—
Thailand	General													PG 13					PG 18		Adults		—
Turkey	General							7+						13+					18+				Exempt
United States	TV-Y (E/I)							TV-Y7(-FV)(E/I)							TV-14			TV-MA					—
United States	TV-G (E/I)														TV-14			TV-MA					—
United States	TV-PG														TV-14			TV-MA					—
Venezuela	Todo usuario																		Adulto				—
Venezuela	Supervisado																		Adulto				—
Vietnam	P													K			T16		T18				C
Vietnam	P													T13			T16		T18				C
Country	0	1	2	3	4	5	6	7	8	9	10	11	12	13	14	15	16	17	18	19	20	21	Other

== Use ==
=== Australia ===
==== Child-specific ratings ====
Symbol	Abbreviation	Name	Description
P-rated (pink)	P	Preschoolers	Programmes deemed to specifically meet the educational needs and interests of preschool children who have not yet started school. P-rated content must be broadcast between 7 am and 4:30 pm, Monday to Friday.
C-rated (orange)	C	Children	Programmes deemed to specifically meet the educational needs and interests of children of school age who are under 14 years of age. C-rated content must be broadcast between 7 a.m. and 8:30 a.m. or between 4 p.m. and 8:30 p.m on weekdays or 7 a.m. and 8:30 p.m. on weekends and school holidays.

==== Standard ratings ====
Classifications are intended to be equivalent to the Australian Classification Board (ACB) classifications of the same name. They're usually presented with the same shape and sometimes colour as their ACB counterparts.

Symbol	Abbreviation	Name	Description
	E	Exempt	Exempt from classification; Only very specific types of material can be exempt from classification and the material cannot contain anything that exceeds the constraints of the PG classification. These include news & current affairs, sports broadcasting, education videos and certain documentaries.
G-rated (green)	G	General	General exhibition, suitable for all ages but not necessarily intended for children and may be more suitable for older children or adults. Content is VERY MILD in impact. G content may air at any time of day.
PG-rated (yellow)	PG	Parental Guidance Recommended	Parental guidance is recommended for young viewers. Content is MILD in impact; Elements in these programmes may require parental supervision for young children. PG content may air at any time of the day.
M-rated (lime)	M	Mature	Recommended for viewing only by persons aged 15 years or over. Content is MODERATE in impact; These programmes may require a mature perspective and are deemed not suitable for all children. M content may only be broadcast between 7:30 p.m. and 6:00 a.m. on any day, and additionally between 12:00 p.m. and 3:00 p.m. on school days.
MA15+-rated (red)	MA 15+	Mature Accompanied	Not suitable for people under 15. Content is STRONG in impact; It is advised people under the age of 15 do not view these programs, due to the strength of the elements within. MA 15+ programming may only be broadcast between 8:30 p.m. and 6:00 a.m. on any given day. Consumer advice is mandatory.
AV15+-rated (purple)	AV 15+	Mature Accompanied (Adult Violence) No longer used	Not suitable for people under 15. The category deal with content or contain depictions that require a more mature perspective. Violence is STRONG in impact; this classification was the same as MA 15+, except the "AV" stands for "Adult Violence". AV 15+ content was broadcast between 9:30 p.m. and 5:00 a.m. on any day. Consumer advice is mandatory. The AV 15+ classification was abolished after 30 November 2015. Strong impact violence is now incorporated into the MA 15+ classification.

Adult "Pay Per View" only

Symbol	Abbreviation	Name	Description
	R 18+	Restricted R 18+	Not for anyone under 18; this is limited to Adult "Pay Per View" VC 196 and 197, access to these programmes is locked by a personal password. Content may include prolonged scenes of intense violence, sexual situations, coarse language and strong drug use.
	X 18+	Restricted X 18+	Contains material that is pornographic in nature. No one under 18 may legally rent, buy, possess, exhibit, hire, or view these programmes, on television, DVD, or otherwise. The exhibition or sale of these programmes to people under the age of 18 years is a criminal offence carrying a maximum fine of $5,500.

R 18+ and X 18+ restricted classifications are not permitted for free-to-air broadcast in Australia. Many R 18+ movies on DVD/Blu-ray are often edited on Free TV/cable networks, to secure an MA 15+ classification or lower. Some movies that were classified R 18+ on DVD have since been aired on Australian TV with an MA 15+ classification.

===== Consumer advice =====
Consumer advice is compulsory for all MA 15+ and one-off programmes, as well as very short series classified M or higher (such as feature films, miniseries and documentaries). When a programme carries consumer advice, appropriate abbreviations are displayed along with the classification symbol after each commercial break. In general, these abbreviations are as follows:

- A – used for programmes with adult themes, medical procedures or crude humour.
- V – used for programmes depicting violence;
- L – used for programmes coarse language;
- S – used for programmes depicting simulated sex scenes and/or references;
- H – used for programmes containing horror or supernatural themes;
- D – used for programmes with drug references and/or use;
- N – used for programmes containing nudity;

For violence, coarse language and sex scenes, the intensity and/or frequency is mentioned in front of the consumer advice. These include: "mild", "stylised", "some", "frequent" or "strong". Example: "strong sex scenes".

=== Brazil ===
A television content rating system in Brazil was implemented following a consultation in 2006. Since then, the television networks themselves rate the shows, while the indicative rating (Portuguese: Classificação Indicativa) judges the content to guarantee that the rating is appropriate for that specific show. On broadcast networks, where the system is mandatory, the ratings are also translated in Brazilian Sign Language, and may also carry content descriptors. The icons must be shown at the start of each block of the show, and their respective promos.

The Brazilian content rating system utilises age-specific classifications (with the exception of L-rated programming), and generally follow the film ratings. However, unlike with films, television programmes can be rated by the broadcaster with the need to formally submit them for a rating, although the Department of Justice, Ratings, Titles and Qualification (DEJUS) reserves the right to revise the rating. Ratings assigned by the broadcaster mirror those assigned by DEJUS, but are preceded by the letter "A".

In 2025, a new rating was introduced, which set at an age threshold of 6-years-old.

Symbols	Abbreviations	Portuguese Name	English Translation
	L	Livre para todos os públicos	Suitable for all public.
	AL	Livre para todos os públicos	Suitable for all public.
	6	Não recomendado para menores de 6 anos	Not suitable for viewers under 6 years of age.
	A6	Não recomendado para menores de 6 anos	Not suitable for viewers under 6 years of age.
	10	Não recomendado para menores de 10 anos	Not suitable for viewers under 10 years of age.
	A10	Não recomendado para menores de 10 anos	Not suitable for viewers under 10 years of age.
	12	Não recomendado para menores de 12 anos	Not suitable for viewers under 12 years of age.
	A12	Não recomendado para menores de 12 anos	Not suitable for viewers under 12 years of age.
	14	Não recomendado para menores de 14 anos	Not suitable for viewers under 14 years of age.
	A14	Não recomendado para menores de 14 anos	Not suitable for viewers under 14 years of age.
	16	Não recomendado para menores de 16 anos	Not suitable for viewers under 16 years of age
	A16	Não recomendado para menores de 16 anos	Not suitable for viewers under 16 years of age
	18	Não recomendado para menores de 18 anos	Not suitable for viewers under 18 years of age (access to these programmes is locked by a personal password)
	A18	Não recomendado para menores de 18 anos	Not suitable for viewers under 18 years of age (access to these programmes is locked by a personal password)

=== Canada ===
The Canadian TV Classification System was created in late 1997 for English-language programmes to use, which lined up with those of the American v-chip, both matching that system and allowing television manufacturers to use the same backbone firmware for both systems. The upper-right corner of symbols are shaped like the corner of a maple leaf, as is used in the national flag, and are rendered in black and white. The icons are intended to be shown once an hour lasting 15 seconds, although in the case of longer programmes that do not start on the hour, some broadcasters show the rating at the start and at the top of each subsequent clock hour, while others show the rating at the start and again precisely one hour later. However, there are some networks like Global that only display the television rating at the beginning of the show. The icons are displayed in the upper-left corner and the size is mandated to be a minimum of 52 scan lines or pixels tall, and must also fully cover an American ratings icon if burned-in or broadcast live by an American broadcaster.

Additionally, should a programme contain content potentially unsuitable for some viewers, such as violence, coarse language, or nudity, members of the self-regulating Canadian Broadcast Standards Council (which does not include the CBC, although it still uses such warnings) are required to air a disclaimer at the beginning of the programme and at the end of each commercial break, advising viewer discretion (such disclaimers are only required for the first hour if airing after 9:00 p.m.). This disclaimer is technically required even if the final commercial break comes immediately before the closing credits, and some (but not all) channels in fact observe this.

Notably, the television rating given may depend on the level of cable and satellite, or if the programme is broadcast over-the-air. Also, television ratings are generally considered more restrictive than movie ratings.

==== English-language ratings ====
Canadian Television Ratings

The Canadian rating system for English-language broadcasters (as well as third-language broadcasters, which broadcast in a language other than English or French) is as follows:

- Exempt – Programming that is exempt from ratings (such as news and sports programming) will not display an on-screen rating at all.
- C – Programming is intended for younger children under the age of 8 years. No offensive language or sexual content of any level allowed. Might contain occasional comedic, unrealistic depictions of violence.
- C8 – Intended for children ages 8+. Infrequent/mild violence and fantasy horror is allowed. No profanity is allowed, but occasional "socially offensive and discriminatory" language is allowed if in the context of the story. No sexual content of any level allowed.
- G – Intended for general audiences. Programming suitable for the entire family with minimal and infrequent violence. No profanity is allowed, but offensive slang is permitted. No sexual content.
- PG – Intended for general audiences, but may not be suitable for children under the age of 8. Moderate violence and infrequent/mild profanity is allowed. May contain brief nudity and sexual references if important to the context of the story. Some content may not be suitable for children under the age of 8 and parental supervision is recommended for children aged 8–13.
- 14+ – Programming intended for viewers ages 14 and older. May contain intense violence and strong/frequent profanity. Might contain nudity and depictions of sexual activity as long as they are within the context of a story. Parents are strongly cautioned to exercise discretion in permitting viewing by pre-teens and early teens without parent/guardian supervision.
- 18+ – Programming intended for viewers ages 18 and older. May contain explicit violence, graphic language, and explicit portrayals of sexual activity. Programming with this rating cannot air before the watershed (9:00 p.m. to 5:00 a.m.).

==== Quebec ratings ====
French-language broadcasters use a rating system that is virtually identical to Quebec's Régie du cinéma's film rating system, with one additional category (8+):

- G: Général (general) – appropriate for all ages and must contain little or no violence and little to no sexual content.
- 8+ ans – appropriate for children 8 and up may contain little violence, language, and little to no sexual situations;
- 13+ ans – suitable for children 13 and up and may contain moderate violence, language, and some sexual situations;
- 16+ ans – recommended for children over the age of 16 and may contain strong violence, strong language, and strong sexual content;
- 18+ ans – to be viewed by adults and may contain extreme violence and graphic sexual content. It is mostly used for 18+ movies and pornography.
- An E rating (no rating will appear on screen) is given to exempt programming, in the same classes used for English-Canadian programming above.

=== Colombia ===
As of 2011, programmes in Colombia are regulated by the National Television Commission, and are divided into the following categories:

- Children - Programmes that have been designed and produced to meet the entertainment, education or training needs of children between 0 and 12 years old, whose narrative and language respond to the profile of that audience. They must be broadcast between 07:00 and 21:30. These programmes must be suitable to be watched by the child audience, without the company of adults.
- Teenager - Programmes that have been designed and produced to meet the entertainment, education or training needs of children between 12 and 18 years old, whose narrative and language respond to the profile of that audience. They must be broadcast between 07:00 and 21:30. These programmes must be suitable to be watched by the adolescent audience, without the company of adults.
- Family - Programmes that have been designed and carried out to meet the needs of entertainment, education or training of the family. They must be broadcast between 05:00 and 22:00. These programmes should be suitable for viewing by the whole family and may require the company of adults.
- Adult - Programmes that have been designed and carried out to meet the entertainment, education or training needs of those over eighteen (18) years of age. They must be broadcast between 22:00 and 05:00. These programmes should be suitable for viewing by the adult population. The presence of children and adolescents shall be subject to the co-responsibility of the parents or adults responsible for the aforementioned population.

Programmes containing pornography or apologies for violence are not allowed to be broadcast at all in Colombia, even in the adult fringes.

=== Denmark ===
The Danish ratings administered by the Media Council for Children and Young People

Since 1 September 2020, the Media Council for Children and Young People (Medierådet for Børn og Unge) classifies all programmes and films for television broadcast and video-on-demand release, using the same rating system also used for theatrically released films and home media releases. On television, the age limit must be informed orally before the programme starts or continues. The clear rating should be shown during the entire transmission time or a minimum first five minutes, and must be available in programme listings. Films and series on VOD services must have age ratings and mention the content in them that explains why the content was given its rating. The location of the rating is up to the individual provider as long as it is visible to the consumer before choosing a film or programme.

This television classification system only applies to domestic television channels and VOD services, such as DR, TV 2, TV3, Kanal 4 and Viaplay. As such, it does not apply to foreign television channels and VOD services, including international streaming services such as Netflix, Max and Disney+.

The requirements apply to all programming outside of news & current affairs; music; sports; live telecasts; instructional & leisure programmes; programming of nonprofit political or religious nature; preface of programmes; and teaching & research programmes.

The ratings are:

- A – Suitable for a general audience.
- 7 – Not recommended for children under 7.
- 11 – For ages 11 and up.
- 15 – For ages 15 and up.

=== Ecuador ===
Article 65 of the Communications Law of Ecuador presents the following classification:

- A: Apto para todo público (Suitable for all age groups). It can be transmitted at any time, especially in the "FAMILIAR" (FAMILY), from 6:00 to 18:00.
- B: Apto para todo público, con vigilancia de una persona adulta (Suitable for all age groups, with supervision of an adult). It can be transmitted at any time, especially in "RESPONSABILIDAD COMPARTIDA" (SHARED RESPONSIBILITY), from 18:00 to 22:00; but not during FAMILIAR.
- C: Apto solo para personas adultas (Suitable only for adults). It can be transmitted only during the hours of "ADULTOS" (ADULT), from 22:00 to 6:00.

The classification to which belongs each programme will be arranged by the Consejo de Regulación y Desarrollo de la Información y Comunicación (Regulatory and Development Council of Information and Communication) depending on the parameters which are considered relevant.

=== Finland ===
Categories of the Finnish ratings system

The ratings system for television programmes shown on Finnish television channels consists of the following mandatory age classifications:

- S (or T for Swedish-language programming) – allowed at all times; suitable for all audiences
- 7 – allowed at all times, not for persons under 7;
- 12 – allowed at all times, not for persons under 12;
- 16 – not allowed air before 9:00 p.m., not for persons under 16;
- 18 – not allowed air before 11:00 p.m., not for persons under 18.

If a programme is classified as '16' or '18', a notification or a password prompt must be shown before broadcast.

Programmes with an age rating may contain an additional marker for violence (a fist), sex (the male and female symbols), fear (a spider), or substance abuse (a syringe).

=== France ===
A content rating system in French is regulated by the Regulatory Authority for Audiovisual and Digital Communication (ARCOM, the new CSA). Each rating icon is translucent and, as of December 2012, is shown for the whole duration of the show.

Categories of the French television classification system
- If no rating appears, it is most likely appropriate for all ages.
- Déconseillé aux moins de 10 ans (English: not recommended for children under 10) – not allowed in children's television blocks;
- Déconseillé aux moins de 12 ans (English: not recommended for children under 12) – not allowed air before 10:00 p.m. (some channels and programmes are subject to exception);
- Déconseillé aux moins de 16 ans (English: not recommended for children under 16) – not allowed air before 10:30 p.m. (some channels and programmes are subject to exception);
- Déconseillé aux moins de 18 ans (English: not recommended for persons under 18) – allowed only between midnight and 5 a.m, access to these programmes is locked by a personal password.

There initially was no ratings system for French television. In March 1961, following the broadcast of a film where a female nude was briefly visible, the "white square" was introduced. A white square, replaced by a white rectangle in 1964, was displayed in the corner of the screen. An off-screen voice warned at the beginning of the programme that it was unsuitable for all audiences. This system continued until 1996 when the Conseil supérieur de l'audiovisuel replaced it with a system of five pictograms, indicating the suitability of the programme. This system was replaced by the current system on 18 November 2002.

=== Germany ===
Categories of the FSF television classification system

In Germany, every broadcaster has to show a disclaimer displaying the sentence Die nachfolgende Sendung ist für Zuschauer unter 16/18 Jahren nicht geeignet before transmission if the programme contains potentially offensive content. This roughly translates to The following programme is not suitable for viewers under 16/18 years of age. The Freiwillige Selbstkontrolle Fernsehen (FSF) checks many shows in private television.

- 0 – For all ages, can be broadcast any time.
- 6 – For ages 6 and up, can be broadcast any time.
- 12 – For ages 12 and up, split between content that can be broadcast any time, and content that can only be broadcast between 20:00 and 06:00.
- 16 – For ages 16 and up, can only be broadcast between 22:00 and 06:00.
- 18 – For ages 18 and up, can only be broadcast between 23:00 and 06:00.
- X – No broadcast.

=== Ghana ===
In Ghana, TV series and selected TV programmes are classified by the Film Classification Committee:

Categories of the Ghana classification system
- U – Universal for all categories of persons.
- PG – Viewers below twelve are to watch under Parental Guidance.
- 12+ – For persons of twelve years and above (generally suitable for children aged under 12).
- 15+ – For persons of fifteen years and above (aimed at a teenage audience).
- 18+ – For persons of eighteen years and above only (specifically for adults).
- NS – Not suitable for public exhibition.

=== Greece ===
A new content rating system in Greece was introduced on 30 September 2019. The system is now associated with the age of viewers and has new visual symbols (replacing rhombus, circle, triangle, square and cross symbols), however, there are no mature-accompanied ratings compared to the previous system. The ratings are compulsory and are displayed and verbally announced at the beginning of each broadcast. These provisions are enforced by the Greek National Council for Radio and Television (ESR).

Categories of the Greek television classification system
- K – suitable for all ages
- 8 – suitable for ages 8 and up (allowed only 30 minutes before and after the kid-friendly zone)
- 12 – suitable for ages 12 and up (allowed only between 9:30 p.m. and 6:00 a.m., or between 10:00 p.m. and 6:00 a.m. during Fridays, Saturdays and school holidays)
- 16 – suitable for ages 16 and up (allowed only between 11:00 p.m. and 6:00 a.m.)
- 18 – suitable for ages 18 and up (allowed only between 1:00 a.m. and 6:00 a.m.)

Also, programmes suitable for ages 12 and up will be accompanied by a special word marker identifying their content, which is divided into the following four categories:

- ΒΙΑ (English: VIOLENCE): The programme contains scenes of violence.
- ΣΕΞ (English: SEX): The programme contains sex scenes.
- ΧΡΗΣΗ ΟΥΣΙΩΝ (English: USE OF SUBSTANCES): The programme contains scenes of drug use and other addictive substances.
- ΑΚΑΤΑΛΛΗΛΗ ΦΡΑΣΕΟΛΟΓΙΑ (English: INAPPROPRIATE LANGUAGE): The programme contains inappropriate language.

=== Hong Kong ===
The Hong Kong television rating system is since by generic code of television programmes standard of the Broadcasting Ordinance (Cap.562) on 11 December 1995. The current ratings are:

- If no rating appears, it is for general audiences.
- PG (parental guidance recommended) – programmes are unsuitable for children, parental guidance is recommended; programmes that are classified as 'PG' should not be broadcast between 4:00 p.m. and 8:30 p.m. every day, as this is a watershed devised for family viewing.
- M (mature) – programmes are recommended only for adult viewers above the age of 18, only allowed to be shown between 11:00 p.m. and 6:00 a.m. Before 24 September 2020, the programmes were only allowed to be shown between 11:30 p.m. and 6:00 a.m.

=== Indonesia ===
The Indonesian Broadcasting Commission (KPI)'s Broadcasting Code regulate broadcast television content that classifies television programme into several classifications:

- SU – Semua Umur (All Ages) – suitable for all ages over the age of 2 years;
- P – Prasekolah (Preschool) – suitable for preschool children aged 2 through 6 (not yet in use by any TV channel);
- A – Anak-anak (Children) – suitable for children from ages 7 through 12;
- R – Remaja (Teenagers) – suitable for teens from ages 13 through 17;
- D – Dewasa (Adult) – suitable for viewers over 18 and older only. Programmes with this rating may only be aired between 22:00 local time and 03:00 local time the next day.

There is officially also a BO (Bimbingan Orangtua, Parental Guidance) subrating often used accompanied with the above ratings (P-BO, A-BO, or R-BO).

In addition, all films and advertisements broadcast in Indonesia must be rated by the Film Censorship Agency (LSF) and use the ratings provided by the LSF to rate those films and advertisements broadcast. Although the Broadcasting Code only requires films and advertisements to be rated by the LSF prior to broadcast, many broadcasters opted to have all prerecorded programmes (not just films and advertisements) to be rated by the LSF and use the ratings given by the LSF on rating those programmes.

=== Mexico ===

The classification system of television programmes in Mexico is rated by the Dirección General de Radio, Televisión y Cinematografía, and consists of the following classes:

- AA – for persons of all ages, mostly for children (can be broadcast anytime);
- A – for persons of all ages, parental guidance is recommended for children under 7 years (can be broadcast anytime);
- B – for persons over 12 years of age (allowed only between 16:00 and 05:59);
- B-15 – for persons over 15 years of age (allowed only between 19:00 and 05:59);
- C – for adults (i. e. persons over 18 years of age) only (allowed only between 21:00 and 05:59);
- D – exclusively for adults (allowed only between midnight and 05:00);

=== Morocco ===
The classification system of television programmes in Morocco is established by the HACA. There are 4 categories. Before the airing of the program, an off-screen voice warned at the beginning of the programme that it was unsuitable for all audiences.

Category	Symbol	Name	Broadcast restriction
1	No symbol	All audiences	No restriction
2		Not recommended for under 10	Prohibited broadcast from 12:00 to 14:00 and between 17h and 19h from Monday to Friday, until 14h on Saturday and Sunday
3		Not recommended for under 12	Prohibited broadcast from 12:00 to 14:00 and between 17h and 19h from Monday to Friday, until 14h on Saturday and Sunday
4		Not recommended for under 16	No broadcast daily before 22:30

=== Netherlands ===
The Kijkwijzer ratings and descriptors used in the Netherlands since January 2020

The television rating system in the Netherlands was created in 2001 by the Dutch Institute for the Classification of Audiovisual Media (NICAM) and is known as Kijkwijzer (ViewingGuide or WatchWiser). The same rating systems are used for both television programmes and films, and serve partly as guidelines (Programmes with the classification 12, 14 and 16 years may only be broadcast from 8pm and with the classification 18 years from midnight. Cinemas and theatres in the country cannot provide films with the classification 16 years to people under the age of 16). They are the same as Dutch film ratings.

The following age ratings apply:

- AL – All Ages (Alle leeftijden)
- 6 – Parental advisory for children under 6 (Let op met kinderen tot 6 jaar)
- 9 – Parental advisory for children under 9 (Let op met kinderen tot 9 jaar)
- 12 – Parental advisory for children under 12 (Let op met kinderen tot 12 jaar)
- 14 – Parental advisory for children under 14 (Let op met kinderen tot 14 jaar)
- 16 – Parental advisory for children under 16 (Let op met kinderen tot 16 jaar)
- 18 – Parental advisory for children under 18 (Let op met kinderen tot 18 jaar)

There are also six descriptor icons used:

- Violence (Geweld)
- Fear (Angst)
- Sex (Seks)
- Discrimination (Discriminatie)
- Drugs and/or alcohol abuse (Drugs- en/of alcoholmisbruik)
- Coarse Language (Grof taalgebruik)

=== New Zealand ===
On 1 May 2020, New Zealand realigned its television content rating system to a common system for free-to-air television, subscription television and on-demand services:

- G: Approved for general viewing (this was unchanged from the previous rating system).
- PG: Parental Guidance recommended for younger viewers (previously known as PGR, Parental Guidance Recommended).
- M: Suitable for mature audiences 16 years and over.
- 16: People under 16 years should not view.
- 18: People under 18 years should not view.

The last three ratings replaced the former AO (Adults Only) classification.

On free-to-air television, programmes classified M can be broadcast between 9:00am and 3:00pm on weekdays (school term time only, as designated by the Ministry of Education) and from 7:30pm until 5:00am on a daily basis. Programmes classified 16 can only be broadcast after the 8:30pm watershed, while programmes classified 18 can only be broadcast after 9.30pm.

On pay television, where content filtering is not available, programmes classified 18 can only be broadcast between 8.00pm and 6:00am on a daily basis and from 9:00am until 3:00pm on weekdays (school term time only). If content filtering is available, programmes classified 18 can be broadcast at any time. Explicit adult sex programmes classified 18 may screen only on premium channels.

The following descriptor codes (audience advisories) may be added for programmes classified PG or higher:

- C: Content may offend
- L: Language may offend
- V: Contains violence
- S: Sexual content may offend

=== North Macedonia ===
North Macedonia uses five symbols for each programme. They are as follows:

- ● – Programme can be watched by everyone.
- ● – Programme not recommended for children below the age of 8 (parental supervision recommended under this age).
- ■ – Programme not recommended for children below the age of 12 (parental supervision required under this age). Only broadcast between 20:00 to 5:00.
- ▲ – Programme not recommended for children below the age of 16 (parental supervision required under this age). Only broadcast between 22:00 to 5:00.
- X – Programme not suitable for audiences under 18 years of age. Only broadcast between 0:00 to 5:00.

The symbols are put in the lower-left or lower right corner on screen.

=== Norway ===
Norwegian rating system

In Norway Television broadcasters are obliged to classify their programmes in the following age categories: A (all ages), 6 years, 9 years, 12 years, 15 years or 18 years. The classification must be based on the guidelines made by The Norwegian Media Authority. Programmes in the different age categories must be transmitted according to the following time schedule during the day:

- A, 6, 9 – allowed at all times
- 12 – only allowed during the period 19:00 – 05:30
- 15, 18 – only allowed during the period 21:00 – 05:30

Television broadcasters shall specify the age limit acoustically before the programme starts or clearly mark the programme with an age limit throughout its duration. Television broadcasters shall also specify the age limit in programme schedules and electronic programme guides. Content that is judged to be seriously harmful to minors is strictly prohibited from being broadcast.

=== Philippines ===
In the Philippines, the Movie and Television Review and Classification Board, commonly known as MTRCB, implements and regulates local television content rating systems. In 1979, it only had implemented two television ratings: "General Viewership" (GV) later renamed (General Patronage/GP) in 1995 and "Parental Guidance" (PG), in the mid-1990s up until from now on, some advisories are simply written on the upper left side or at the lower right side of the television screen.

On 6 October 2011, in order to encourage parents to supervise and be responsible with their children in watching television, the MTRCB revamped its rating system, implementing a three-tiered system:

Pictogram	Classification rating	English name	Filipino name	Description
	G	General Patronage	–	Suitable for all audiences.
	PG	Parental Guidance	Patnubay at Gabay	May contain scenes or other content that are unsuitable for children without the guidance of a parent.
	SPG	Strong Parental Guidance	Striktong Patnubay at Gabay	Contains mature themes or moderate to intense violence, which may be deemed unfit for children to watch without strong and vigilant parental supervision.

The new ratings system is similar to the old one, but the look and the ratings themselves were completely revamped. All of these were only implemented on Free to-Air Television stations. The new system consists of a new full-screen advisory of the programme's rating which is played before each programme, whatever the rating of such programme is, except in the case of programmes with SPG rating, wherein the rating must be aired twice (before the start of the programme and after each commercial break. e.g. in the middle part of the programme). A rating pictogram then appears at the bottom right corner of the screen during a programme if it was rated as such. Sometimes, when annotations are to be put and it takes the place of the pictogram, then it has to be put on the upper left corner of the screen, opposite the logo of the TV station.

On 9 February 2012, the SPG rating was implemented, which utilises at least one of the following content descriptors:

- T for tema (themes);
- L for lengguwahe (language);
- K for karahasan (violence); {V is also used for programmes in English or a foreign language}
- S for sekswal (sex);
- H for horror; and
- D for droga (drugs);

The SPG rating was first broadcast on the film Cinco which was aired in ABS-CBN, where it had its old advisory.

=== Poland ===
Before 2000, Poland did not have a uniform classification system for television programmes. Some stations, however, applied their own systems. TVP showed a card with the text "Adult only" or "Film for adult audiences only". Canal+ used their set-top box key colours (green, yellow, red) to indicate "General Audiences", "Most Likely for Adults" and "For Adults". Until 27 February 2000, TVN marked adult movies with a pulsating red circle. On 1 March 2000, the "Friendly Media" agreement with the KRRiT and the broadcasters was reached to introduce a uniform system of classification. Eight television broadcasters – TVP, Polsat, TVN, Nasza TV, Canal+, Wizja TV, Polish Cable Television and TV Niepokalanów – had signed the agreement.

The current Polish television rating system was introduced on 15 August 2005 and consists of five icons which need to be broadcast for the entire duration of the programme. On 28 August 2011, their appearance was changed to the following:

Symbol	Name	Broadcast restriction	Possible contents
	No age limit	None	Positive or neutral view of the world, little to no violence, non-sexual love, and no sexual content.
	For minors from age 7	None	As above; may additionally contain some mild language, bloodless violence, and a more negative view of the world.
	For minors from age 12	None	May contain some foul language, some violence, and some sexual content.
	For minors from age 16	Only; 8 PM–6 AM	Deviant social behaviour, world filled with violence and sexuality, simplified picture of adulthood, display of physical force, especially in controversial social context (against or by parents, teachers, etc.), immoral behaviour without ethic dilemma, putting the blame on the victim, excessive concentration on material possessions.
	Permitted from age of 18 only	Only; 11 PM–6 AM	One-sided display of the joys of adult life without showing responsibilities (e.g. work), social justification of violent behaviour, excessive vulgarity, use of racial slurs and social stereotypes, explicit sexual content, praise of aggression or vulgarity, access to these programmes is locked by a personal password. Since May 2022, this category is split further into four sub-categories: P – Przemoc (Violence), N – Narkotyki (Drugs), S – Seks (Sex) and W – Wulgaryzm (Vulgarity).

=== Portugal ===
Portuguese television rating icons

For a long time, the only existing regulation on Portuguese television was that programmes with potentially shocking or harmful content could air only between 10:30pm and 6am and with a red circular marker on the top-right corner of the screen indicating it was for audiences aged 16 and over.

In 2006, all free-to-air networks decided to complement this rule with a shared, more detailed rating system for TV shows:

- Todos (suitable for all)
- 10, Acompanhamento Parental (may not be suitable for children under 10, parental guidance advised)
- 12, Acompanhamento Parental (may not be suitable for children under 12, parental guidance advised)
- 16 (not suitable for children under 16), access to these programmes is locked by a personal password.

These logos must be shown during 10 seconds in the beginning of any programme and after every break. If a programme is rated 16, it can only be broadcast between 10:30pm and 6am. However, most cable channels in Portugal use the Spanish classification system.

=== Romania ===
The current Romanian rating symbols were adopted in September 2002, and are as follows: On 3 April 2006, the rating "16" was abolished and was replaced with "15":

- Unrated – programmes can be viewed by any age.
- AP – programmes are recommended for children with parental guidance.
- 12 – programmes not for children below the age of 12 years, May only air between 20:00 and 6:00
- 15 – programmes not for teens and children below the age of 15 years, May only air between 22:00 and 6:00
- 18 – the programme is recommended only for adult viewers (for ages 18 and up), May only air between 0:00 and 6:00

=== Russia ===
Russian rating system

The rating system for programmes and films shown on Russian television:

- 0+ (Suitable for all ages)
- 6+ (May not be suitable for young children)
- 12+ (Intended for viewers over the age of 12)
- 16+ (Intended for viewers over the age of 16)
- 18+ (Unsuitable for children, only for adults)

These logos are shown in the beginning of the programme and after every ad break.

=== Singapore ===

Singapore has adopted the use of TV Ratings from 21 October 2011. They consist of PG and PG13 ratings for Free-to-Air TV and NC16 and M18 ratings in addition to the PG and PG13 ratings for Pay TV channels. For Free-to-Air TV, the shows rated PG may be aired anytime while PG13 should air between 10pm to 6am. For Pay TV, PG13 rated programmes can be shown anytime. Before the rated programme starts the TV channels will show a notification. From now on, only StarHub TV's and Singtel TV's self-packaged non-regional Pay TV channels (e.g. StarHub TV's E City and Sensasi and Singtel TV's FashionTV HD and FashionTV HD on Demand, both of which features modelling nudity in certain programmes) are enabled to carry NC16 and M18 rated content. FashionTV is also Singapore's first official M18 rated channel. M18 rated programmes can only be telecast from 10pm onwards to 6am on Pay TV. Regional channels like Fox Life, Fox Movies and HBO Asia are unable to carry Infocomm Media Development Authority's film ratings as they are targeted at the same region (a certain group of Asia territories), which results in programmes being subjected to external censorship of a much harsher nature outside Singapore territorial control. Only Video on Demand (VOD) Pay TV services are allowed to carry R21 content currently. G-rated programmes are not required to show a notification for any channel.

=== Slovakia ===
The rating labels and content descriptors used in Slovakia

Slovak government accepted a law in 2001 (updated in 2007), in which television stations are required to display one of the following icons during all the programme and in promos:

- Children's programming – Content created primarily for children under 12.
- U – Suitable for all age groups.
- 7 – Content not suitable for children under 7 years
- 12 – Content not suitable for children under 12 years
- 15 – Content not suitable for children and teens under 15 years, may only be broadcast from 8:00 pm to 6:00 am (except for trailers with this rating [or lower, for that matter] as they can be broadcast anytime)
- 18 – Content suitable only for those 18 years and older, may only be broadcast from 10:00 pm to 6:00 am (except for trailers with this rating as they can be broadcast 8:00 pm to 6:00 am)

Additional icons used only for educational content which are unused after 2024:

- -7 – Educational content suitable for children younger than 7.
- 7+ – Educational content suitable for children over 7 years
- 12+ – Educational content suitable for children over 12 years
- 15+ – Educational content suitable for teens over 15 years, this programme may only be broadcast from 8:00 pm to 6:00 am

For content suitable for all children, a green "U" icon is available, but broadcasters are not required to use it. Until 2007, all ratings went with faces: green smiley face – all viewers; orange sad face – suitable for 7, 12, 15 years and over; red very sad face – suitable for adults only. In 2024, rating were once again updated, this time at beginning of each programme and in promos, content descriptions were added to the programming:

- Violence (for the "7", "12", "15" and "18" ratings)
- Discrimination (only for the "15" and "18" ratings)
- Fear/Horror (for the "7", "12" and "15" ratings)
- Addiction (only for the "15" and "18" ratings)
- Sex (for the "12", 15 and "18" ratings)
- Profanity (for the "12", "15" and 18" ratings)
- Nudity (only for the "12" rating)

=== Slovenia ===
Slovenian government accepted a law, which requires television stations to play a voiceover and age icon warning, which has to be at least 10 seconds long, before programmes inappropriate for some audiences begin. Additionally, one of the following icons (a white rhombus with the age number) has to be displayed for the duration of the programme:

- VS (vodstvo staršev) – Parental guidance suggested for children under the age of 12.
- 12 – Content suitable for children over the age of 12.
- 15 – Content suitable for teens over the age of 15.
- 18 – Content suitable for adults only.
- 18+ – Not suitable for persons under 18, contains explicit sexual content, may only be broadcast on demand in television programmes and in on-demand audiovisual media services if those programmes are subject to mandatory restricted access for exclusively adults through an assigned PIN or equivalent protection system. Access must be locked by default, and the user must be able to set access to the programme content, whereby only an adult who becomes acquainted with the purpose of technical protection and who is provided with detailed instructions on its use can be given permission to view (code, password).
- 18++ – Pornographic content/programmes which unlawfully depict violence. These programmes are subject to mandatory restricted access for the exclusive reaches of legal age through an assigned PIN or equivalent protection system. Access must be locked by default, and the user must be able to set access to the programme content, whereby only an adult who becomes acquainted with the purpose of technical protection and who is provided with detailed instructions on its use can be given permission to view (code, password).

Two symbols were used for designating television content unsuitable for all audiences starting in 2003. A red triangle with a stylised eye inside icon was used for content where parental guidance is advised for viewers under the age of 15, while content not allowed under the age of 15 had to be recognisable by a red circle symbol with a stylised eye inside. In 2007 new content rating symbols were introduced: red inverted triangle-shaped symbols with VS (parental guidance), +12 and +15 inscriptions, while for 18+ rated content a red circle-shaped symbol with the letters AD inside was used. Current television content rating symbols were introduced in 2014.

Age rating symbols can since 2017 be accompanied by additional symbols, which are not shown on-screen and warn the audience of the type of inappropriate content: They are only obligatory shown online on video-on-demand platforms and not during television programming

- Violent content can be recognised by a white rhombus, containing two stick figures. One is laying on the floor while being beaten up by the other with a baseball bat.
- Scary content contains a white rhombus with a stylised grey ghost figure.
- Sexual content is recognised by a white rhombus, containing conjoined male and female sex symbols (circle with a cross, pointing downwards and a circle with an arrow, pointing upwards).
- Programmes, containing dangerous scenes are equipped with a white rhombus, containing a crouching stick figure, trying to jump over a fence and an open fire.
- If a programme includes discriminative scenes, a white rhombus, containing three stick figures, of which the middle one is white, while the other two are black is shown.
- A white rhombus, containing a bottle, defaced with a stylised face warns of programming including drug and/or alcohol abuse scenes.
- If there is usage of inappropriate or strong language in a show, a white rhombus, containing a speech bubble with a hash sign, ampersand ("and" sign) and an exclamation mark is seen.

Programmes, appropriate for all audiences do not have a rating.

The public broadcaster RTV Slovenija and most other broadcasters use three watersheds. 12+ rated content is shown between 8 p.m. and 5 a.m., 15+ rated programmes are allowed between 10 p.m. and 5 a.m., and adult-only content can be shown between midnight and 5 a.m. Cartoons and children's programmes have to be screened until 7 p.m., while content rated VS (Parental Guidance) should not be screened before 7 p.m.

=== South Korea ===
The South Korean television rating system has been in force since 2000, and it started with only four classifications which were All, 7, 13 and 19. In February 2001, all programmes except domestic dramas (which had been enforced since November 2002) has required to have a rating system. In 2007, the 13 rating was replaced with 12 and the 15 ratings. Most programmes have to be rated, except the "exempt" rating below. Even if it qualifies for being exempt, a broadcaster may apply a rating.

Example of Korean TV rating icons

Korean television rating system icons
- All (모든 연령 시청가): This rating is for programmes that are appropriate for all ages. Television programmes with this rating may contain some violence and/or some mild language. No adult content is allowed.
- 7 (7세 이상 시청가): This rating is for programmes that are suitable for those above 7 years old. Television programmes with this rating can contain mild violence, mild language and few romance.
- 12 (12세 이상 시청가): This rating is for programmes that are suitable for those above 12 years old. Television programmes with this rating may contain horror, some fantasy violence, some sexual content, little use of strong language, mild blood, and/or mild suggestive themes.
- 15 (15세 이상 시청가): This rating is for programmes that are suitable for those above 15 years old. TV shows with this rating may contain use of alcohol, more sexual content, mild violence or little strong violence, major blood or gore, and/or suggestive themes.
- 19 (19세 이상 시청가): This rating is for programmes that are suitable for those above 19 years old. 19-rated programming is banned from airing during the hours of 7:00AM to 9:00AM, and 1:00PM to 10:00PM. (7:00 AM to 10:00 PM on Weekends and Public Holidays Only) Programmes that receive this rating will almost certainly have adult themes, sexual situations, strong language and disturbing scenes of violence.
- Exempt (no icon or name): This rating is only for knowledge based game shows; lifestyle shows; documentary shows; news; current topic discussion shows; education/culture shows; sports that excludes MMA or other violent sports; and other programmes that the Korea Communications Standards Commission recognises. Disclaimer or rating icons are not needed.

Rating icons may be transparent, and can be positioned either on the upper-left or upper-right corner of the screen. The icon has a size of at least 1/20 of the screen, and has black writing on a yellow circle with a white outline. These icons are shown for 30 seconds when the programme starts, and are shown again every 10 minutes, and when the programme resumes after commercial breaks. This does not apply to 19-rated programmes, where the icon must be visible throughout the entire programme. These regulations do not apply to the "All" rating, as it does not have an icon. A rating disclaimer is displayed on the start of the programme for five seconds stating "This programme is not suitable for children/youths under the age of X, so parental guidance is required" (이 프로그램은 X세 미만의 어린이/청소년이 시청하기에 부적절하므로 보호자의 시청지도가 필요한 프로그램입니다) for 7, 12, and 15 ratings. "All" and "19" ratings have a different disclaimer, which say "This programme is suitable for all ages" (이 프로그램은 모든 연령의 시청자가 시청할 수 있는 프로그램입니다) and "This programme is not suitable for youths under the age of 19" (이 프로그램은 19세 미만의 청소년이 시청하기에 부적절한 프로그램입니다) respectively.

These ratings are used by all South Korean television broadcasters. Despite being intended for viewing outside of the country, KBS World also uses these ratings.

South Korean television ratings do not include content descriptors or advisories as they do in most other nations. The ratings are therefore used in a broader sense.

=== Spain ===
In Spain, between 1963 and 1985, a rhombus rating system was devised by the Censorship Committee of TVE and first applied on 1 May 1963. Initially it had two levels.

- One rhombus (◊) – Not suitable for viewers under the age of 14.
- Two rhombuses (◊◊) – Not suitable for viewers under the age of 18.

The two rhombuses appeared in the right upper corner of the screen, generally, at the start of the programmes.

The current rating system for TV was designed in 1999 and has been updated few times since then. Since 2015, the following categories are used:

- (Especialmente recomendada para la infancia): Specially recommended for younger children.
- (Todos los públicos): For general viewing.
- : Not recommended for viewers under the age of 7.
- : Not recommended for viewers under the age of 12.
- : Not recommended for viewers under the age of 16.
- : Not recommended for viewers under the age of 18.
- (Content X): Pornographic or incitement to violence content.

Unrated programmes (like newscasts) do not display any icon on the screen. Nowadays rating symbols are shown during all the programme and in promos; each channel has its right to choose its design and where it has to be placed. A warning tone can be heard every time a 18-rated programme starts; these cannot be shown on free-to-air television before 10 PM and after 6 AM. X-rated content isn't allowed on free-to-air television.

==== Catalonia ====
In Catalonia, different guidelines for TV ratings are used, although sometimes Spanish ratings are also shown, specially if a film with an ICAA rating had been issued for it. TP-rated shows do not show any icon and all, and every other icon is coloured yellow (except for the 18 rating, which also uses a triangular shape instead of a squared one), and only show during the first 30 seconds (except for any rating higher than 13).

- (Especialment recomanat per a la infància): Specially recommended for younger children. Optional and very rare rating.
- (Per a tothom): For general viewing.
- : Not recommended for viewers under the age of 7.
- : Not recommended for viewers under the age of 10.
- : Not recommended for viewers under the age of 13.
- : Not recommended for viewers under the age of 18.

=== Thailand ===
In Thailand, a television rating system was introduced in 2006 alongside a movie rating system for movies. In September 2013, the television rating was revised.

Thai television rating symbols

Under the new guideline, the so-called 'Free TV' channels have to label their programmes and reschedule their shows to comply in the following categories:

- Preschool (ป) – content suitable for preschool-aged children
- Children (ด) – content suitable for children between 6–12 years old
- General (ท) – content suitable for general audiences
- PG 13 (น๑๓) – content suitable for people aged 13 and above, but can be watched by those who are under the recommended age if parental guidance is provided. Under this category, the content can be shown on television between 8:30 p.m. and 5:00 a.m.
- PG 18 (น๑๘) – content suitable for people aged above 18 years old; those who are younger than 18 must be provided with parental guidance. The programmes can be shown on television between 10:00 p.m. and 5:00 a.m.
- Adults (ฉ) – content only suitable for viewers 20 and older, and can be viewed on TV only between 12:00 a.m. and 5:00 a.m.

TV programmes in Thailand are already labeled by a certain system of categories, a practice criticised by rights group as nanny-state censorship and ridiculed by some Netizens for its confusing standards.

=== Turkey ===
Turkish television rating system and descriptor icons

The TV content rating system in Turkey was introduced by RTÜK in 2006. The ratings are the following:

- Genel İzleyici – General audience. Suitable for all ages. Shown (family symbol) at the beginning of the programme/movie and after every commercial break.
- 7+ – Suitable for ages 7 and over. Shown at the beginning of the programme/movie and after every commercial break.
- 13+ – Suitable for ages 13 and over. Shown for the whole duration of the programme/movie (may be translucent). May only be broadcast between 9:30 p.m. and 5:00 a.m.
- 18+ – Suitable for ages 18 and over. Shown for the whole duration of the programme/movie (may be translucent). May only be broadcast between 12:00 a.m. and 5:00 a.m.
- Şiddet ve/veya Korku – Violence and/or horror
- Cinsellik – Sexuality
- Olumsuz Örnek Oluşturabilecek Davranışlar – Negative examples

News programmes, sports competitions, religious ceremonies and commercial communication broadcasts are exempt from the content rating system.

=== United States ===
==== TV Parental Guidelines ====
The TV parental guidelines were first proposed on 19 December 1996, as a voluntary-participation system—in which ratings are determined by participating broadcast and cable networks—by the United States Congress, the television industry and the Federal Communications Commission (FCC), and went into effect by 1 January 1997, on most major broadcast and cable networks in response to concerns from parents and advocacy groups regarding increasingly explicit sexual content, graphic violence and strong profanity in American television programming, and was designed to be used in conjunction with the V-chip, which the U.S. government had mandated to be built into all television sets manufactured from 2000 onward (and the vast majority of cable/satellite set-top boxes). The system—which is used for, including but not limited to, most television series, specials, made-for-television films, and theatrically released films re-edited for broadcast or basic cable telecast—has since been applied to internet-based television services (such as Hulu, Amazon Prime Video and Netflix), digital video retailers (such as Apple's iTunes Store and Google Play) and digital media players (such as Amazon Fire TV, Apple TV, Android TV and Roku). The guidelines are not assigned to sports or news programmes nor are they used during commercial advertisements, outside of promotional ads for network programmes.

The rating icons are required to be shown for 15 seconds at the start of each program, although since June 2005, many advertiser-supported network broadcasters and some syndication divisions also display the assigned rating for that particular programme after each commercial break; for networks and syndicators that continue to run the rating icon once per hour during a programme running longer than 60 minutes, the broadcaster may show the rating again during a segment/scene that starts closest to the top of the next clock hour. Premium channels—in addition to applying them to any offered original programming—may assign Parental Guideline ratings for theatrical or home video-released movies that either did not receive a Motion Picture Association-assigned rating or were aired as an "unrated" cut, which is an exempt.

United States television rating system icons

TV-Y – All Children: This program is designed to be appropriate for all children, including children from ages 2-6.
Designed to be appropriate for children of all ages. The thematic elements portrayed in programmes with this rating are specifically designed for a very young audience.

TV-Y7 – Directed to Older Children: This program is designed for children age 7 and above.
Designed for children age 7 and older. The FCC states that it "may be more appropriate for children who have acquired the developmental skills needed to distinguish between make-believe and reality". The thematic elements portrayed in programmes with this rating contain mild fantasy and comedic violence.

TV-Y7-FV Programs where fantasy violence may be more intense or more combative. Programmes given the "FV" content descriptor exhibit more 'fantasy violence' and are generally more intense or combative than other programmes rated TV-Y7.

TV-G – General Audience: Most parents will find this program suitable for all ages.
Programmes are generally suitable for all audiences, though they may not necessarily contain content of interest to children. The FCC states that "this rating does not signify a program designed specifically for children, [and] most parents may let younger children watch this program unattended". The thematic elements portrayed in programmes with this rating contain little or no violence, mild language, and little or no sexual dialogue or situations.

TV-PG – Parental Guidance Suggested: This program contains material that parents may find unsuitable for younger children.
Programmes may contain some material that parents or guardians may find inappropriate for younger children. Programmes assigned a TV-PG rating may include infrequent coarse language, some sexual content, some suggestive dialogue, or moderate violence.

TV-14 – Parents Strongly Cautioned: This program contains material that most parents would find unsuitable for children under 14 years of age.
Programmes contain material that parents or adult guardians may find unsuitable for children under the age of 14. The FCC warns that "parents are cautioned to exercise some care in monitoring this program and are cautioned against letting children under the age of 14 watch unattended". Programmes with this rating contain intensely suggestive dialogue, strong coarse language, intense sexual situations or intense violence.

TV-MA – Mature Audience Only: This program is specifically designed to be viewed by adults and therefore may be unsuitable for children under 17.
Contains content that may be unsuitable for children. This rating is rarely used by broadcast networks or local television stations, although it is commonly applied to television programmes featured on certain cable channels (basic and premium networks) and streaming networks for both mainstream and softcore programmes. Programmes with this rating may include crude indecent language, explicit sexual activity and graphic violence.

Some thematic elements, according to the FCC, "may call for parental guidance and/or the program may contain one or more of the following" sub-ratings, designated with an alphabetic letter:

- D – Suggestive dialogue (not used with TV-MA-rated programmes)
- L – Coarse language
- S – Sexual content
- V – Violence
  - FV – Fantasy violence (exclusive to TV-Y7-rated programmes)

Up to four content descriptors can be applied along with an applied rating, depending on the kind of suggestive content featured in a programme (with the exception of the "FV" sub-rating, due to its sole applicable use for children's programmes). As the rating increases pertaining to the age, the content matters generally get more intensive. The 'suggestive dialogue' descriptor is used for TV-PG and TV-14 rated programmes only, although certain networks may choose to rate their TV-MA programmes with the descriptor, while the DLSV sub-ratings are only used with the TV-PG and TV-14 ratings.

An additional content descriptor, "E/I", is applied to select TV-Y, TV-Y7, and TV-G programmes that are designed to meet the educational and informative needs of children aged 16 and under. A minimum of three hours of E/I-compliant programming must be broadcast per week by each television network; E/I programming must air between 6:00 a.m. and 10:00 p.m. to count toward this minimum.

==== Content advisory ratings (premium cable and pay-per-view) ====
The American pay television industry uses a separate, unrelated content advisory system—used in conjunction with the TV Parental Guidelines and the Motion Picture Association rating system—that first went into effect on 1 March 1994, on participating cable-originated premium channels and pay-per-view services (led by the system's charter services, HBO, Cinemax, Showtime and The Movie Channel). Inspired by similar content guidelines that had already been included in the services’ monthly programme guides, the voluntary-participation system provides guidance to pay-cable subscribers on the suitability of a program for certain audiences based on its content.

=== Venezuela ===
Television content in Venezuela is regulated by the Law on Social Responsibility on Radio and Television (Ley de Responsabilidad Social en Radio y Televisión), introduced in January 2003. Free-to-air television broadcasters are required to classify their programmes using the following ratings:

- Todo usuario: Suitable for all ages.
- Supervisado: Parental supervision recommended for children and teens (only allowed between 7:00 p.m. and 7:00 a.m.).
- Adulto: Suitable only for adults aged 18 or older (only allowed between 11:00 p.m. and 5:00 a.m.).

It is mandatory for all Venezuelan television stations to broadcast a short presentation, before the broadcast of any programmes, made by the same channel, where the type of programme (recreational, informational, mixed, etc.), type of production (domestic or national independent) elements include containing (such as language, health, sex and/or violence) and lastly the rating of the programme.

=== Vietnam ===
In Vietnam, VOD and pay-TV contents are subject to the same regulations used to classify films. The current ratings are:

- P – Suitable for all ages.
- K – Should not be viewed by viewers under 13 years old unless they are with their parents or guardians.
- T13 – Not suitable for viewers under 13.
- T16 – Not suitable for viewers under 16.
- T18 – Not suitable for viewers under 18.
- C – Prohibited.

== See also ==
- Mobile software content rating system
- Motion picture content rating system
- Video game content rating system
- Watershed (broadcasting)
