= General Authority of Media Regulation =

Saudi Arabian government organization

Agency overview
- Formed: 2012
- Jurisdiction: Saudi Arabia
- Headquarters: Riyadh, Saudi Arabia
- Agency executive: Media Minister, Chairman
- Parent department: Ministry of Media
- Website: gmedia.gov.sa/en

The General Authority of Media Regulation (Gmedia; Arabic: الهيئة العامة لتنظيم الإعلام) is a government organization in Saudi Arabia that censors and represses media organizations and individuals who publish media content contrary to rules that GAMR puts out.

It was founded in 2012 originally as the General Commission for Audiovisual Media (GCAM), and is responsible for the development, regulation, and supervision of audio-visual media transmission, publication, and overall media content within the state.

== History ==
The General Commission for Audiovisual Media (Arabic: الهيئة العامة للإعلام المرئي والمسموع) was founded following decision no. #236 of the Council of Ministers on 21 Rajab 1433 AH (11 June 2012). In Shawwal 1433 AH (September 2012), the organisation of General Commission for Audiovisual Media was approved, which includes having a board of directors headed by the Minister of Culture and Information (or presently the Minister of Media as of 2018).

In September 2023, to comply with Saudi Vision 2030, the Council of Ministers have approved to reorganise the General Commission for Audiovisual Media to include regulation for publication media, subsequently transforming the agency into the General Authority of Media Regulation. By December 2023, the Ministry of Media has revealed the strategy and corporate identity of the General Authority of Media Regulation.

As of December 2022, Abdullatif bin Mohammed Al-Abdullatif (عبداللطيف بن محمد العبداللطيف) has been appointed as CEO of the General Authority of Media Regulation.

== Responsibilities ==
Gmedia conducts and regulation and policies audiovisual activities in accordance with Kingdom’s “media policy” as well as provides related services to facilitates the content broadcasting. furthermore, it issues and manages licenses for audiovisual media transmission and content. Gmedia is also responsible for technical issues and specifications related to the media such as providing the approval for the frequency spectrum, media transmission devices.

== Saudi cinema ==
In December 2017, the General Commission for Audiovisual Media (now Gmedia) chaired by Ministry of Culture and Information (currently Ministry of Media) announced the re-opening the cinema in the Kingdom where the commission would be responsible for granting licenses to cinemas.

== Saudi Arabian age rating systems ==
=== Video games ===
In August 2016, GCAM (now Gmedia) introduced Saudi Arabia's official age rating system for video games. This came following two years of research, and working closely with Sony MEA's Saudi office. Any game title is effectively banned if Gmedia refuses to give it a rating, unless publishers possibly address concerns and remove violating content specifically for the market. The ratings include the following:

Icon	Rating	Description
	3	Video game content suitable for ages 3 and above.
	7	Video game content suitable for ages 7 and above.
	12	Video game content suitable for ages 12 and above.
	16	Video game content suitable for ages 16 and above.
	18	Video game content suitable for ages 18 and above.
	21	(Introduced in 2025) Video game content suitable for ages 21 and above only.
	To be classified	(Introduced in 2020) Video game content has not been yet classified. This symbol is used in early marketing prior to said game's release.

=== Films ===
Following the December 2017 announcement of film theatres re-opening in Saudi Arabia, in early 2018 Deadline Hollywood reported that the Center for International Communication (CIC) started developing a new content classification system for films to be exhibited in the country. By April 2018, GCAM (now Gmedia) has officially approved of a 6-category film content classification system. In June 2022, the system was silently revised with an additional "PG15" classification, and the "R12" classification has been eventually officially retired.

Any film is refused classification (effectively banned) if said film does not pass Gmedia's censorship standards, unless edited by the film's local or global distributor if possible. Theatres are obligated to refuse admittance to any minor under minimal age from viewing films rated "R15" or higher. As of December 2023, the film ratings received slightly redesigned icons reflecting the corporate identity of Gmedia, and include the following:

Icon	Rating	Description
	G	Film is suitable for a general audience of all ages.
	PG	Parental guidance is advised for film audience below 12 years old.
	PG12	Film audience below 12 years old must be accompanied by an adult.
	PG15	Film audience below 15 years old must be accompanied by an adult.
	R15	Film audience below 15 years old are prohibited to be admitted.
	R18	Film audience below 18 years old are prohibited to be admitted.

=== Former ratings ===
Icon	Rating	Description	Years used
	R12	Film audience below 12 years old are prohibited to be admitted. (This classification has been phased out and retired.)	2018-2022
