= Brazilian advisory rating system =

Content rating for movies, games and television

Advisory rating Classificação Indicativa
- Abbreviation: ClassInd
- Formation: 1990; 36 years ago
- Purpose: Rating body
- Headquarters: Brasília, Federal District, Brazil
- Parent organization: Ministry of Justice
- Website: https://www.gov.br/mj/pt-br/assuntos/seus-direitos/classificacao-1

The Brazilian Advisory Rating (Portuguese: Classificação Indicativa, abbreviated ClassInd) is a content rating system in Brazil for the classification of movies, games and television programs. The ClassInd rating system is controlled by the Advisory Rating Coordination (Coordenação de Classificação Indicativa) of the Department of Justice Policies (Departamento de Políticas de Justiça). It is established on the National Secretariat of Justice (Secretaria Nacional de Justiça) of the Ministry of Justice.

== Staff ==
The staff consists of about 10 people, including raters and the administrative staff, having passed public service exams, with various academic backgrounds. These content rating analysts undergo continuous training, and never affix a rating individually. All works are watched by at least two analysts separately and if there is no consensus, the analysis group is broadened.

== Analyses and criteria ==
The criteria that guide the public policy of the content rating are supported under 3 broad themes—sex, drugs, and violence—content considered inappropriate to the upbringing of children and adolescents. The analysis is made counterbalancing the frequency, relevance, context, intensity and importance to the plot of scenes, dialogues and images containing violence, drug use and sex/nudity. This margin of subjectivity ensures flexibilities that are critical to the process and the rating result. The analyses consist of three steps: factual description, thematic description and age grading. When the process is finished, it is subjected to the coordination, and finally to the director of the department, who makes the order for publication on the Brazilian Official Journal, along with small content descriptors. The criteria for rating the works were developed taking into account national and international studies and public hearings in all regions across Brazil, including public debates, both face-to-face and online.

Aiming to provide an instrument for the choice of the family, the Practical Guide was created, which claims to bring transparency and objectivity to the public policy of the content rating, showing detailed analysis criteria, subdivided by age groups. They can serve broadcasters, producers and distributors of movies and games and also families and society in general.

The objectivity of the analysis departs from moral considerations and moralistic views. The Ministry of Justice specifically cited that sexual orientation does not aggravate the rating and that, in fact, showing material of respect and encouragement to diversity can attenuate the rating. They also specified that their job is to give an advisory rating for parents, therefore, they do not have any legal right to ban, demand cuts or refuse to rate any work.

== Works ==
=== Films and television programs ===
People under the minimum age indicated by the rating can watch the movie if accompanied by an adult guardian or if they are carrying a consent form, except for 18-rated movies on the cinemas. Movies rated 18 are legally restricted to persons aged 16 and over, and those aged 16 and 17 require parental consent. Films for cinema and DVD/Blu-ray releases are previously rated by the ClassInd. TV programs are rated by their own broadcasters and therefore the rating can be accepted or denied if considered inappropriate. Ratings assigned by the broadcaster itself rather than assigned by DEJUS (e.g. a TV network or a streaming service), are preceded by the letter "A".

=== Video games ===
The Entertainment Software Rating Board (ESRB) system was de facto adopted by some Brazilian distributors, consequence of working with North American publishers, and was not translated from English or adapted to the Brazilian culture, being inappropriate for the Brazilian market and leaving most consumers uninformed. It was introduced by Senator José Gregori, that the growing game market in Brazil needed bigger control over the countless games sold in the country every day.

Since 2001, games are rated in Brazil by the Department of Justice, Rating, Titles and Qualification, part of the Ministry of Justice.

The ClassInd rating system is the same for games, films and television programs. Rating is mandatory for all games released in Brazil. However, after becoming a member of the International Age Rating Coalition in 2013, it became easier for digitally distributed games to receive a ClassInd rating.

== Rating ranges ==
NOTE: There are also operational descriptions of attenuating and aggravating elements, such as scene composition, relevance, frequency, motivation, among others, that can interfere on the final rating.

Symbols	Abbreviations	Description
	L	Livre para todos os públicos (General Audiences): The following contents are accepted for this age range: Violence: Fantasy violence; display of weapons without violence; very mild swear words; deaths without violence; slapping; fighting; bones and skeletons without violence. Sex and Nudity: Non-erotic or hidden nudity; kissing; farting. Drugs: Moderate or suggestive use of legal drugs. Interactivity: Essential and risk-free educational resource.
	AL	Livre para todos os públicos (General Audiences): The following contents are accepted for this age range: Violence: Fantasy violence; display of weapons without violence; very mild swear words; deaths without violence; slapping; fighting; bones and skeletons without violence. Sex and Nudity: Non-erotic or hidden nudity; kissing; farting. Drugs: Moderate or suggestive use of legal drugs. Interactivity: Essential and risk-free educational resource.
	6	Não recomendado para menores de seis anos (Not recommended for minors under six): The following contents are accepted for this age range: Violence: Balanced depiction of sadness; weapon without violence; mild offensive language; fantasy violence. Sex and Nudity: Educational content on sexuality. Drugs: Educational content on drug prevention. Interactivity: Controlled interaction mode with artificial intelligence; restricted and pedagogical interaction mode.
	A6	Não recomendado para menores de seis anos (Not recommended for minors under six): The following contents are accepted for this age range: Violence: Balanced depiction of sadness; weapon without violence; mild offensive language; fantasy violence. Sex and Nudity: Educational content on sexuality. Drugs: Educational content on drug prevention. Interactivity: Controlled interaction mode with artificial intelligence; restricted and pedagogical interaction mode.
	10	Não recomendado para menores de dez anos (Not recommended for minors under ten): The following contents are accepted for this age range: Violence: Anguish; displays of weapons with violence; fear or tension; vomiting; distress; bones and skeletons with signs of violent acts; criminal acts without violence; derogatory language; mild swear words. Sex and Nudity: Educational content about sex; tongue kiss. Drugs: References to the use of legal drugs; discussion on the issue "drug trafficking"; medicinal use of illegal drugs. Interactivity: Generative AI for controlled educational content.
	A10	
	12	Não recomendado para menores de doze anos (Not recommended for minors under twelve): The following contents are accepted for this age range: Violence: Violent act; body injury; violent references; blood presence; victim's pain or suffering; deaths with violence; animal cruelty; exposure to danger; showing people in embarrassing or degrading situations; verbal aggression; obscenity; bullying; corpses; sexual harassment; overvaluation of the physical beauty; overvaluation of consumption. Sex and Nudity: Veiled nudity; sexual innuendo; sexual fondling; genitals; masturbation; sexual arousal; coarse language; swear words used in a sexual context; sexual references; sex simulation; sexual appeal. Drugs: Use of legal drugs; medication misuse; inducing the use of legal drugs; discussion on the "decriminalization of illegal drugs"; illegal drug references. Interactivity: Secure communication between users; advertising or marketing communication.
	A12	
	14	Não recomendado para menores de quatorze anos (Not recommended for minors under fourteen): The following contents are accepted for this age range: Violence: Abortion; euthanasia; sexual exploitation; intentional death; death penalty; social stigma or prejudice. Sex and Nudity: Erotization; moderate nudity; crude language; sexual intercourse; prostitution. Drugs: Suggestive use of illegal drugs; references to the use or trafficking of illegal drugs Interactivity: Online shopping or product exchange; direct communication without standard protection; broad-scope generative artificial intelligence.
	A14	
	16	Não recomendado para menores de dezesseis anos (Not recommended for minors under sixteen): The following contents are accepted for this age range: Violence: Act of pedophilia; hate crime; rape; incest; sexual coercion; mutilation; sexual abuse; suicide; sexual violence; torture; gratuitous violence/trivialization of violence. Sex and Nudity: Intense sexual intercourse; strong sexual content; complete nudity. Drugs: Production or trafficking of any illegal drug; use of illegal drugs; inducing the use of illegal drugs; cannabis. Interactivity: Data sharing; location sharing; algorithmic curation with targeted engagement; automated beauty filter; continuous engagement mechanisms.
	A16	
	18	Não recomendado para menores de dezoito anos (Not recommended for minors under eighteen): The following contents are accepted for this age range: Violence: Apology to violence; extreme violence; cruelty. Sex and Nudity: Explicit sex; complex/strong impact sexual situation; violent fetishes; pornography. Drugs: Apology to the use of illegal drugs. Interactivity: Digital manipulation tool with sensitive content; betting functionality or gambling simulation; interaction functionality with potential for harm; online interaction intended for relationships; purchase of random virtual items (loot box); advertising and sale of adult content.
	A18	

=== Former ratings ===
Icon	Description
	Especialmente recomendado para crianças e adolescentes (Especially recommended for children and teenagers); This film and/or TV program does not contain any inappropriate contents, and is aimed at viewers under 10. This rating was abandoned in 2008.

=== Content descriptors ===
Information on the rating system includes content descriptors which are a summary of the main rating indicators inserted in the work rated. The list of descriptors explains the rating system and also informs parents and guardians about the type of content that the work contains. For instance, a work rated as "10 years old" and with the descriptor "Violence" will contain light violent scenes, while a work rated as "16 years old" and the same descriptor will show stronger violent scenes. Below is a list of the sixteen terms used in the rating system:

1. Violência (Violence);
2. Violência Extrema (Extreme Violence);
3. Violência Fantasiosa (Fantasy Violence);
4. Conteúdo Sexual (Sexual Content);
5. Nudez (Nudity);
6. Sexo (Sex);
7. Sexo Explícito (Explicit Sex);
8. Drogas (Drugs);
9. Drogas Lícitas (Legal Drugs);
10. Drogas Ilícitas (Illegal Drugs);
11. Linguagem Imprópria (Inappropriate Language);
12. Atos Criminosos (Criminal Acts);
13. Conteúdo Impactante (Shocking Content);
14. Temas Sensíveis (Sensitive Themes);
15. Procedimentos Médicos (Medical Procedures);
16. Medo (Fear).

== Requesting a rating ==
In order to request a Qualification Rating, one will have to provide a documentation (in a Portuguese-language form) which explains why a media (game/TV show, etc.) is recommended or not to a certain rating. A preview of that media is also compulsory to avoid mistakes during media verification.

The document will have to be sent to the Department of Justice, Rating, Titles and Qualification. There's no fee to get the rating and the process from the documents reception to the official rating can take about 20 days.

== See also ==
- Motion picture rating system
