= Indonesia Game Rating System =

Indonesian video game content rating system

- Formation: 2016; 10 years ago
- Founder: Ministry of Communication and Informatics
- Coordinates: 6.174925°S 106.822367°E
- Region served: Indonesia
- Services: Video game ratings
- Website: www.igrs.id

The Indonesia Game Rating System (IGRS) is a video game content rating system founded by the Indonesian Ministry of Communication and Informatics in 2016. There are 5 classifications of ratings based on the game content, which includes the use of alcohol, cigarettes, drugs, violence, blood, language, sexual content, etc.

IGRS generally assigns age ratings for games that are developed and published in Indonesia, but they also provide age ratings for imported games that are verified as official Indonesian products. Starting as of late 2019, only some physical PlayStation titles are officially verified for sale in Indonesia, such as the PlayStation 4 versions of Death Stranding and Minecraft.

In 2024, Ministry of Communications and Informatics revised the IGRS in Ministerial Regulation MCI 2/2024 by enforcing the requirement that every video game publisher must have an Indonesian representative office to directly submit their game to the MCI for assessment by the IGRS. Failure to do so would require in sanctions such as having the game being banned from access in Indonesia. This regulation will be enforced in practise starting in January 2026, after the Indonesian government overhauls its application system, and relaunches the official IGRS website on October 11, 2025.

== Objectives of IGRS ==
Public or Users: Serves as a guideline for choosing games that are appropriate for specific age categories.

Protection for Publishers: Classified games provide legal certainty and protection from potential misuse by users.

Government: Ensures public protection against the misuse of game products.

== Game Classification Registration ==
On October 11, 2025, the IGRS Service was officially launched and is accessible through the website igrs.id.

The game classification registration process can be conducted through the website or via storefront platforms that have established official partnerships with IGRS.

== Age ratings ==
Rating (2024)	Description
	3+ – Age 3 and over. "Game content is very mild, without elements of violence, fear, or any other negative material."
	7+ – Age 7 and over. "Game content contains no elements of violence, fear, or other negative material. Games in this age group must not feature characters resembling humans. They may include depictions of blood, provided the blood is unrealistic."
	13+ – Age 13 and over. "Game content may contain elements of violence but without expressions of anger and without the use of realistic weapons. It must not include cannibalism or mutilation. Games in this age group may also include online interaction features equipped with language filtering."
	15+ – Age 15 and over. "Game content is more intense and may feature realistic weapons, mature humor, and online interaction features with language filtering. The game must not contain cannibalism or mutilation."
	18+ – Age 18 and over. "Game content may include realistic violence, blood, mature humor, gambling simulation, drug-related elements, and/or other adult themes."
	RC – Refused Classification. "Game content that contains elements of pornography, gambling using legal payment instruments, and/or content that violates laws and regulations. Games with this classification are not permitted to be distributed in Indonesia."

== Controversy ==
In April 2026, the implementation of IGRS on Steam drew condemnation and criticism from both players and game producers in Indonesia. This was due to the IGRS classifications assigned not being consistent with the actual content within the games.

In several cases, games that are actually child-friendly were given 18+ ratings, such as Upin & Ipin Universe. Conversely, games considered non-child-friendly received 3+ ratings, such as PUBG.

According to experts, this chaos occurred because, much like the International Age Rating Coalition (IARC) system on Steam, there is a total reliance on automated systems (bots) via the Steam Content Survey, which are accepted at face value without manual verification from supervisors.

The Ministry of Communication and Digital Affairs (Komdigi) responded that these occurrences were not the result of official verified ratings. Those labels were still self-classifications provided by developers or the platform itself.

Komdigi summoned Valve regarding this incident. The Ministry stated that Valve is indeed still organizing the integration of IGRS into their system, including the self-classification mechanism. Valve issued a statement in March 2026, noting that the initial implementation of IGRS on Steam was still an automated system based on surveys filled out by developers. For those who have not updated or filled them out, they reserve the right to request additional information and data before distribution.

Some netizens are concerned that Steam is under threat of being blocked if they do not clarify the situation immediately. Additionally, some believe that Steam carelessly applied the labels without following proper procedures.

== See also ==
- Internet censorship in Indonesia
