= Video game content rating system =

System used for the classification of video games into suitability-related groups

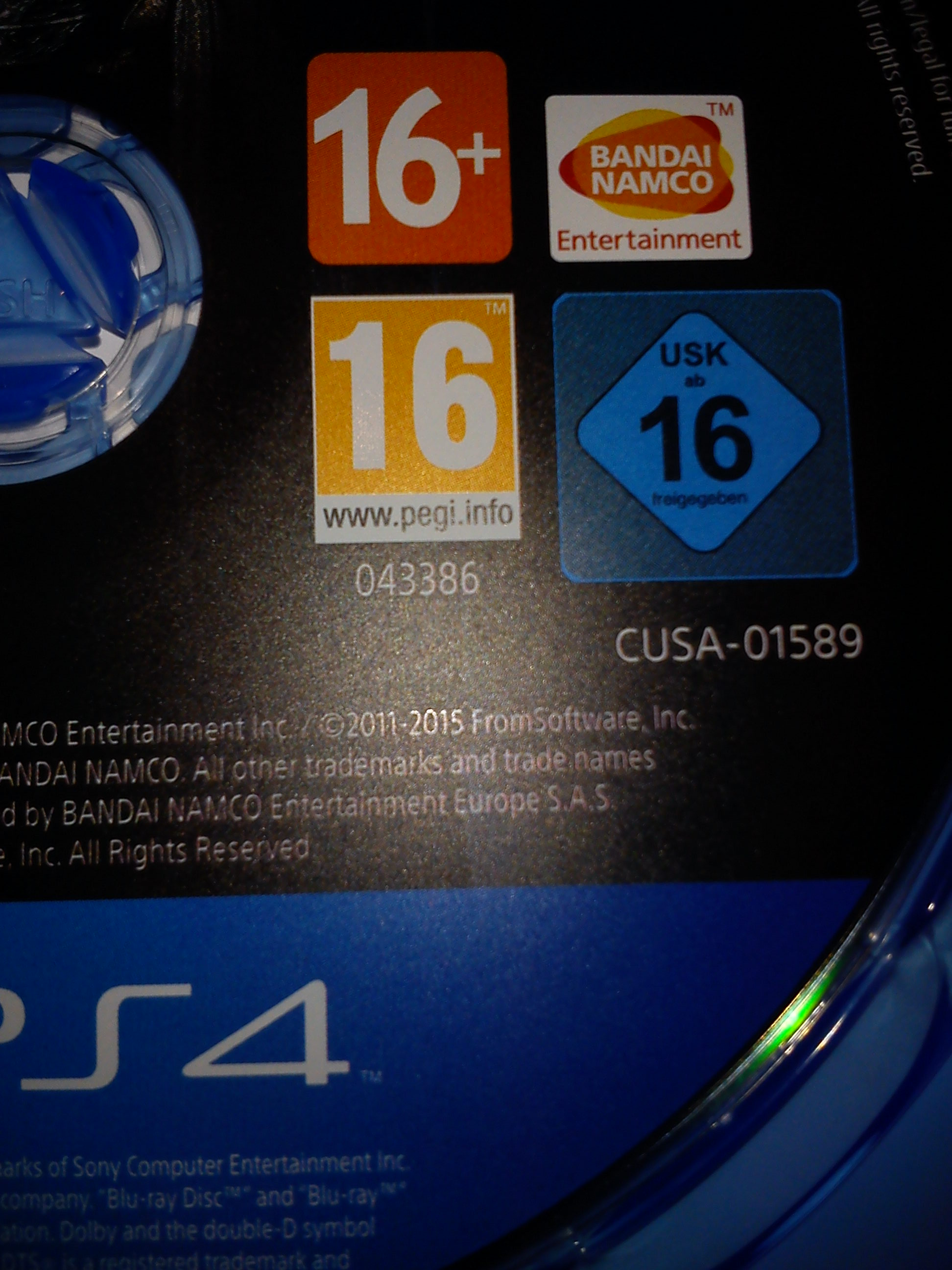
An example of different rating systems on video game discs which is common practice in Europe and Australia. From top left to down right: the Russian video game rating system, the European PEGI system, the German USK, all sharing the same age classification on this example game.

A video game content rating system is a system used for the classification of video games based on suitability for target audiences. Most of these systems are associated with and/or sponsored by a government, and are sometimes part of the local motion picture rating system. The utility of such ratings has been called into question by studies that publish findings, such as 90% of teenagers claim that their parents "never" check the ratings before allowing them to rent or buy video games, and as such, calls have been made to "fix" the existing rating systems. Video game content rating systems can be used as the basis for laws that cover the sales of video games to minors, such as in Australia. Rating checking and approval is part of the game localization when they are being prepared for their distribution in other countries or locales. These rating systems have also been used to voluntarily restrict sales of certain video games by stores, such as the German retailer Galeria Kaufhof's removal of all video games rated 18+ by the USK following the Winnenden school shooting.

== Comparison table ==
A comparison of current video game rating systems, showing age on the horizontal axis. Note however that the specific criteria used in assigning a classification can vary widely from one country to another. Thus a color code or age range cannot be directly compared from one country to another.

Key:

- White – No restrictions: Suitable for all ages / Aimed at young audiences / Exempt / Not rated.
- Yellow – Advisory: Parental guidance is suggested for designated age range.
- Purple – Strong advisory: Not recommended for a younger audience but not restricted.
- Red – Restrictive: Parental accompaniment required for younger audiences.
- Black – Prohibitive: Exclusively for older audiences / Restricted to licensed premises / Banned.

| Country/System | Age rating | | | | | | | | | | | | | | | | | | | | | | Other |
| Country/System | 0 | 1 | 2 | 3 | 4 | 5 | 6 | 7 | 8 | 9 | 10 | 11 | 12 | 13 | 14 | 15 | 16 | 17 | 18 | 19 | 20 | 21 | Other |
|---|---|---|---|---|---|---|---|---|---|---|---|---|---|---|---|---|---|---|---|---|---|---|---|
National/Regional Ratings Systems
| Argentina | ATP | | | | | | | | | | | | | +13 | | | | | +18 | | | | — |
| Australia | G | | | | | | | | | | | | | | | M | | | R 18+ | | | | CTC |
| Australia | PG | | | | | | | | | | | | | | | MA 15+ | | | R 18+ | | | | RC |
| Brazil | L | | | | | | 6 | | | | 10 | | 12 | | 14 | | 16 | | 18 | | | | — |
| Chile | ER | | | | | | | | 8+ | | | | | | 14+ | | | | 18+ | | | | — |
| Chile | TE | | | | | | | | 8+ | | | | | | 14+ | | | | 18+ | | | | — |
| China | — | | | | | | | | 8+ | | | | 12+ | | | | 16+ | | | | | | — |
| Europe (PEGI) Albania Austria Belgium Bosnia and Herzegovina Bulgaria Croatia Cyprus Czech Republic Denmark Estonia Finland France Greece Hungary Iceland Ireland Italy Kosovo Latvia Lithuania Luxembourg Malta Moldova Montenegro Netherlands North Macedonia Norway Poland Portugal Romania Serbia Slovakia Slovenia Spain Sweden Switzerland Turkey Ukraine United Kingdom | — | | | 3 | | | | 7 | | | | | 12 | | | | 16 | | 18 | | | | ! |
| Germany | USK 0 | | | | | | USK 6 | | | | | | USK 12 | | | | USK 16 | | USK 18 | | | | Unrated |
| Germany | USK 0 | | | | | | USK 6 | | | | | | USK 12 | | | | USK 16 | | No Rating | | | | Confiscated |
| Germany | USK 0 | | | | | | USK 6 | | | | | | USK 12 | | | | USK 16 | | Indexed | | | | Confiscated |
| Indonesia | — | | | 3+ | | | | 7+ | | | | | | 13+ | | 15+ | | | 18+ | | | | Refused classification |
| International Age Rating Coalition (IARC) Australia (ACB) Brazil (ClassInd) (European Union) European countries (PEGI) Germany (USK) Indonesia (IGRS) Saudi Arabia (Gmedia/GAMR) South Korea (GRAC) Taiwan (GSRR) United States (ESRB) | — | | | 3+ | | | | 7+ | | | | | 12+ | | | | 16+ | | 18+ | | | | — |
| Iran | — | | | +3 | | | | +7 | | | | | +12 | | | +15 | | | +18 | | | | — |
| Japan (CERO) | A | | | | | | | | | | | | B | | | C | | D | Z | | | | 審査予定 |
| Japan (CERO) | A | | | | | | | | | | | | B | | | C | | D | Z | | | | 教育・データベース |
| Japan (CERO) | A | | | | | | | | | | | | B | | | C | | D | Z | | | | 規定適合 |
| Japan (EOCS) | G | | | | | | | | | | | | 12 | | | 15 | | | 18 | | | | — |
| Mexico | A | | | | | | | | | | | | B | | | B15 | | | C | | | | P |
| Mexico | A | | | | | | | | | | | | B | | | B15 | | | D | | | | P |
| New Zealand | G | | | | | | | | | | | | | R13 | | R15 | M | | R18 | | | | Objectionable |
| New Zealand | PG | | | | | | | | | | | | | R13 | | R15 | R16 | | R18 | | | | Objectionable |
| North America (ESRB) Canada United States | EC | | | | | | | | | | E10+ | | | T | | | | M | AO | | | | RP |
| North America (ESRB) Canada United States | E | | | | | | | | | | E10+ | | | T | | | | M | AO | | | | RP – Likely Mature 17+ |
| Russia | 0+ | | | | | | 6+ | | | | | | 12+ | | | | 16+ | | 18+ | | | | — |
| Saudi Arabia | — | | | 3 | | | | 7 | | | | | 12 | | | | 16 | | 18 | | | 21 | TBC |
| Singapore | G | | | | | | | | | | | | | | | | ADV16 | | M18 | | | | Refused classification |
| Slovakia | "Teddy bear's head" | | | | | | | | | | | | 12 | | | 15 | | | 18 | | | | — |
| Slovakia | U | | | | | | | 7 | | | | | 12 | | | 15 | | | 18 | | | | — |
| South Africa | PG | | | | | | | 7–9PG | | | 7–9PG | | | 13 | | | 16 | | 18 | | | | XX |
| South Africa | PG | | | | | | | — | | | 10–12PG | | | 10–12PG | | | 16 | | X18 | | | | XX |
| South Korea | ALL | | | | | | | | | | | | 12 | | | 15 | | | | 19 | | | Refused classification |
| Taiwan | 0+ | | | | | | 6+ | | | | | | 12+ | | | 15+ | | | 18+ | | | | — |
| United Arab Emirates | — | | | 3 | | | | 7 | | | | | 12 | | | | 16 | | 18 | | | 21 | — |
| Vietnam | 00+ | | | | | | | | | | | | 12+ | | | | 16+ | | 18+ | | | | — |
| Country/System | 0 | 1 | 2 | 3 | 4 | 5 | 6 | 7 | 8 | 9 | 10 | 11 | 12 | 13 | 14 | 15 | 16 | 17 | 18 | 19 | 20 | 21 | Other |
Specific Storefront Ratings Systems
| App Store (iOS/iPadOS) | — | | | | 4+ (aged 5 and under) | | 4+ (ages 6–8) | | | 4+ (ages 9–11) | | | — | 13+ | | | 16+ | | 18+ | | | | No Rating |
| App Store (iOS/iPadOS) | — | | | | 4+ | | | | | 9+ | | | | 13+ | | | 16+ | | 18+ | | | | No Rating |
| Google Play (South Korea) | — | | | 3 | | | | 7 | | | | | 12 | | | | 16 | | | 19 | | | Unrated |
| Google Play (Russia) | — | | | 3 | | | | 7 | | | | | 12 | | | | 16 | | 18 | | | | Unrated |
| Samsung Galaxy Store | All | | | | 4+ | | | | | | | | 12+ | | | 15+ | | | 18+ | | | | Banned |

== Initial controversy ==
Similar to other forms of media, video games have been the subject of argument between leading professionals and restriction and prohibition. Often these bouts of criticism come from use of debated topics such as video game graphic violence, virtual sex, violent and gory scenes, partial or full nudity, drug use, portrayal of criminal behavior or other provocative and objectionable material. Video games have also been studied for links to addiction and aggression. A meta analysis of studies from both eastern and western countries yielded evidence that "strongly suggests that exposure to violent video games is a causal risk factor for increased aggressive behavior, aggressive cognition, and aggressive affect and for decreased empathy and prosocial behavior."

There are also groups that have argued to the contrary, that few if any scientifically proven studies exist to back up these claims, and that the video game industry has become an easy target for the media to blame for many contemporary issues. Researchers have also proposed potential positive effects of video games on aspects of social and cognitive development and psychological well-being. It has been shown that action video game players have better hand-eye coordination and visuo-motor skills, such as their resistance to distraction, their sensitivity to information in the peripheral vision and their ability to count briefly presented objects, than non-players.

== Rating systems ==
=== Argentina ===
The law 26.043 (passed in 2005) states that the National Council of Children, Youth and Family ('Consejo Nacional de la Niñez, Adolescencia y la Familia') in coordination with the National Institute of Cinema and Audiovisual Arts will be the government agencies that assigns age ratings. The Argentine Game Developer Association (Asociación de Desarrolladores de Videojuegos Argentina) was critical of the law. There are three ratings: "Suitable for all public", "Suitable for those over 13 years of age" and "Suitable for those over 18 years of age". In practice, this system has never been enforced or put in active use. Storefronts and retailers choose to use the ESRB, instead.

=== Australia ===
- Advisory categories
  - General (G) – General. The content is very mild in impact. The G classification is suitable for everyone.
  - Parental Guidance (PG) – Parental guidance recommended. The content is mild in impact. It is not recommended for viewing or playing by persons under 15 without guidance from parents or guardians.
  - Mature (M) – Recommended for mature audiences. The content is moderate in impact. Children under 15 may legally access this material because it is an advisory category. However, M classified films and computer games may include classifiable elements such as violence and nudity of moderate impact that are not recommended for children under 15 years.
- Restricted categories
  - Mature Accompanied (MA 15+) – Not suitable for people under 15. Under 15s must be accompanied by a parent or adult guardian. The content is strong in impact.
  - Restricted (R 18+) – Restricted to 18 years and over. The content is high in impact. Despite this category being legally restricted, in Queensland the restriction is not applicable to persons under 2.

The Australian Classification Board (ACB) is a statutory classification body formed by the Australian Government which classifies films, video games and publications for exhibition, sale or hire in Australia since its establishment in 1970. The Classification Board was originally incorporated in the Office of Film and Literature Classification (OFLC) which was dissolved in 2006. Originally a part of the Attorney-General's Department and overseen by the Minister for Justice, the ACB is now a branch of the Department of Communications and the Arts which provides administrative support to the Board and is overseen by the Minister for Communications & the Arts. Decisions made by the Board may be reviewed by the Australian Classification Review Board.

=== Brazil ===

The advisory rating (ClassInd) (Classificação Indicativa in Portuguese) rates films, games and television shows in Brazil. It is controlled by the Ministry of Justice (Ministério da Justiça).

- L - General Audiences.
- 6 - Not recommended for minors under six.
- 10 - Not recommended for minors under ten.
- 12 - Not recommended for minors under twelve.
- 14 - Not recommended for minors under fourteen.
- 16 - Not recommended for minors under sixteen.
- 18 - Not recommended for minors under eighteen.

=== Chile ===

Games are classified by the Council of Cinematographic Classification (Consejo de Calificación Cinematográfica) which is a central agency under the Ministry of Education.

The current age ratings are:

- ER (Especialmente Recomendado) – Recommended for children.
- TE (Toda Edad) – All ages.
- 8+ – Not recommended for children under 8 years of age.
- 14+ – Not recommended for children under 14 years of age.
- 18+ – Not recommended for children under 18 years of age.

The manufacturers, importers, suppliers and merchants are only permitted to sell and rent video games that are classified as 8, 14 or 18, to those who prove they meet those ages respectively. In the case of each sale or lease by physical means, the respective identity card is required.

=== China ===

China introduced a pilot content rating system in December 2020 called the Online Game Age-Appropriateness Warning, which is overseen by the governmental agency China Audio-video and Digital Publishing Association (CADPA). Games with online components are required to show one of the three classifications on websites and registration pages: green for "8+" (appropriate for players 8 years and older), blue for "12+", and yellow for "16+".

=== Europe ===

The Pan European Game Information (PEGI) is a European video game content rating system established to help European parents make informed decisions on buying computer games with logos on games boxes. It was developed by the Interactive Software Federation of Europe (now Video Games Europe) and came into use in April 2003; it replaced many national age rating systems with a single European system. The PEGI system is now used in more than thirty-one countries and is based on a code of conduct, a set of rules to which every publisher using the PEGI system is contractually committed. PEGI self-regulation is composed by five age categories and seven content descriptors that advise the suitability and content of a game for a certain age range based on the games content. The ratings are:

- 3: Suitable for all age groups.
- 7: Not suitable for younger children.
- 12: Not suitable for persons under 12 years of age.
- 16: Not suitable for persons under 16 years of age.
- 18: For adults.

The ratings do not indicate the difficulty of the game or the skill required to play it.

=== Germany ===

Unterhaltungssoftware Selbstkontrolle (USK; lit. 'Entertainment Software Self-Regulation Body'), is Germany's video game rating organization founded in 1994.

- USK 0 - Approved without age restriction.
- USK 6 - Approved for children aged 6 and above.
- USK 12 - Approved for children aged 12 and above.
- USK 16 - Approved for children aged 16 and above.
- USK 18 - Not approved for young persons.

=== India ===
On 10 March 2026, the Bureau of Indian Standards (BIS), under the Media and Entertainment Services Sectional Committee (SSD 13), notified IS 19690:2026 (Video and Digital Games – Age Rating and Content Descriptor Labels – Specification), establishing India's first national age-rating and content descriptor framework for video and digital games. Prior to this, India lacked a standardized domestic video game rating system, relying instead on foreign systems like PEGI or ESRB on global distribution platforms.

The standard defines a self-assessment model comprising six age categories aligned with Indian cinematic and OTT classification conventions:

- U/A 0+: Content suitable for all ages.
- U/A 3+: Content suitable for young children; minimal mature elements.
- U/A 7+: Content suitable for older children.
- U/A 13+: Content suitable for teenagers; mild violence or mature themes.
- U/A 16+: Content suitable for older teenagers; moderate violence, language, or mature themes.
- A: Adult content; explicit material or graphic violence.

The system also incorporates Content Descriptor Labels (CDLs) for elements such as violence, nudity, language, in-game purchases, and "socially sensitive themes" (covering cultural, religious, and community-related sensitivity).

As of 2026, compliance with IS 19690:2026 remains voluntary. Neither a Quality Control Order (QCO) from the government nor a mandatory notification from the Ministry of Electronics and Information Technology (MeitY) has been issued to tie game distribution rights to obtaining a BIS classification.

=== Indonesia ===
The IGRS classifications used in Indonesia as of 2024.

The Indonesia Game Rating System (IGRS) is the official video game content rating system founded and set by the Indonesian Ministry of Communication and Informatics in 2016. IGRS rates games that are developed and published in Indonesia. There are 5 classifications of ratings based on the game content, which includes the use of alcohol, cigarettes, drugs, violence, blood, language, sexual content, etc.

These are the following classifications:

- 3+ – Age 3 and over. No restricted content is shown including adult content, use of drugs, gambling simulation, and online interactions.
- 7+ – Age 7 and over. No restricted content is shown including adult content, use of drugs, gambling simulation, and online interactions.
- 13+ – Age 13 and over. Restricted contents are partially shown, including light use of drugs and alcohol by figures/background characters, cartoon violence, mild language, gambling simulation, horror theme, and online interactions.
- 15+ – Age 15 and over. Restricted contents are partially shown, including limited animated violence without hatred, online interactions with language filters, blood elements, and non-sexual adult humor.
- 18+ – Age 18 and over. Restricted contents are mostly shown, if not all, including use of drugs and alcohol by main characters, realistic violence (blood, gore, mutilation, etc.), crude humor, gambling simulation, horror theme, and online interactions.

Since November 2019, various imported PlayStation titles released since then have been rated by the IGRS after SIE Asia opened their Indonesian office. Those titles are also marked as "Official Indonesia Products" (Indonesian: Produk Resmi Indonesia).

In 2024, the Ministry of Communications and Informatics revised the IGRS in Ministerial Regulation MCI 2/2024, subsequently requiring that every video game publisher to have an Indonesian representative office, as all games imported into the country must be age rated. After overhauling and launching the new application system in October 2025, this will be enforced in practise starting January 2026.

=== International Age Rating Coalition ===

The International Age Rating Coalition (IARC) is an association of various organizations for the global age rating of online games and apps. The age rating is assigned according to the specifications of the respective national self-regulation bodies, so that it is generated directly for each region or country. Before being published on these gaming platforms, the content of games is evaluated using a questionnaire-based system. This questionnaire collects information on content relevant to the protection of minors, such as depictions of violence, as well as on possible risks of use, such as chat or purchase functions.

- 3+ - Video game or software content suitable for ages 3 and above.
- 7+ - Video game or software content suitable for ages 7 and above.
- 12+ - Video game or software content suitable for ages 12 and above.
- 16+ - Video game or software content suitable for ages 16 and above.
- 18+ - Video game or software content suitable for ages 18 and above (adults).

=== Iran ===

The Entertainment Software Rating Association (Persian: اسرا) (ESRA) is a governmental video game content rating system that is used in Iran. Games that have been exempt from the rating are de facto banned from sale in Iran.

- +3 – Ages 3 and over
- +7 – Ages 7 and over
- +12 – Ages 12 and over
- +15 – Ages 15 and over
- +18 – Ages 18 and over

=== Japan ===
In Japan, the content rating is not required by law, but most commercial video game publishers take the industry self-regulations. Console manufacturers often require video game publishers to have their games rated by CERO. Distributors of PC games (mostly dating sims, visual novels, and eroge) require games having the approval of EOCS or Japan contents Review Center. These ratings are referred to by local governments, and the Ordinance Regarding the Healthy Development of Youths (青少年健全育成条例) prohibits retailers from supplying 18+ rating games to persons under 18. Dōjin softs do not have such restrictions, but distribution of obscene materials can be punished under the Article 175 of the Penal Code of Japan.

==== Computer Entertainment Rating Organization ====

The Computer Entertainment Rating Organization (特定非営利活動法人コンピュータエンターテインメントレーティング機構, Tokutei Hieiri Katsudō Hōjin Konpyūta Entāteinmento Rētingu Kikō) (CERO) is an organization that rates video games in Japan, with different levels of rating that inform the customer of the nature of the product and what age group it suits. It was established in June 2002 as a branch of the Computer Entertainment Supplier's Association, and became an officially recognized non-profit organization in December 2003. It currently consists of five age categories and nine content descriptors.

- A – Content is suitable for all ages. Formerly "All."
- B – Contains some content parents may not like for children under the age of 12. Formerly "12."
- C – Some content may be inappropriate for children under the age of 15. Formerly "15."
- D – Contains adult material. It may be inappropriate for anyone under the age of 17.
- Z – Contains strong adult material. It is illegal for anyone under 18 to buy video games with this rating. Formerly "18."
- 教育・データベース – Assigned to educational software.
- CERO – Assigned to free demos and trial versions of games
- 審査予定 – Assigned to games which are currently awaiting classification

==== Ethics Organization of Computer Software ====

The Ethics Organization of Computer Software (一般社団法人コンピュータソフトウェア倫理機構, Ippan Shadan Hōjin Konpyūta Sofutowea Rinri Kikō) (EOCS, or Sofurin) is an incorporated association that rates PC games in Japan. It was established on November 20, 1992, and was incorporated in 2009. The association also works to crack down on copyright infringement of PC games for the companies it represents, and sponsors the Moe Game Award (萌えゲーアワード) to help PC game sales.

The current ratings are:

- General Software - All ages.
- General Software (recommended to ages 12 and over)
- General Software (recommended to ages 15 and over)
- Software that is banned from selling to persons under 18
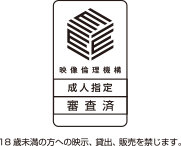
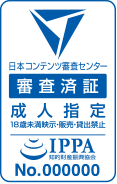

==== Japan Contents Review Center ====
The Japan contents Review Center (日本コンテンツ審査センター, Nihon Kontentsu Shinsa Sentā) is a cooperative that reviews adult videos and adult PC games in Japan. The organization was founded on December 1, 2010, as Ethics Organization of Video (映像倫理機構, Eizō Rinri Kikō) after the dissolution of the Content Soft Association (CSA).

=== Mexico ===

On November 27, 2020, the Secretariat of the Interior (SEGOB) published a new set of guidelines on the Official Journal of the Federation called Lineamentos Generales del Sistema Mexicano de Equivalencias de Clasificación de Contenidos de Videojuegos (General Guidelines of the Mexican System of Classification Equivalencies for Video Game Content). This stated that all games distributed in Mexico would have their own set of ratings effective May 27, 2021, replacing the ESRB ratings system that was being used, while still being in accordance with them.

The ratings are as follows:

- A (Todo Público): For all ages.
- B (+12 Años): Content for teens 12 and over.
- B15 (+15 Años): Content for ages 15 and over.
- C (Adultos +18 Años): Content not suitable for those under 18. Cannot be supplied to consumers below the age of 18.
- D (Exclusivo Adultos): Extreme and adult content. Cannot be supplied to consumers below the age of 18.
- P (Etiquetado Pendiente): Content pending for its classification.

=== New Zealand ===

The Office of Film and Literature Classification (OFLC) is the government agency in New Zealand that is responsible for classification of all films, videos, publications, and some video games in New Zealand. It was created by the Films, Videos, and Publications Classification Act 1993 (FVPC Act), replacing various film classification acts, and is an independent Crown entity in terms of the Crown Entities Act 2004. The head of the OFLC is called the Chief Censor, maintaining a title that has described the government officer in charge of censorship in New Zealand since 1916.

The current ratings are:

- G: This can be shown and sold to anyone.
- PG: Films and games with a PG label can be sold, hired, or shown to anyone. The PG label means guidance from a parent or guardian is recommended for younger viewers.
- M: Films and games with an M label can be sold, hired, or shown to anyone. Films with an M label are more suitable for mature audiences 16 years and over.
- R13: Restricted to persons 13 years and over.
- R15: Restricted to persons 15 years and over.
- R16: Restricted to persons 16 years and over.
- R18: Restricted to persons 18 years and over.
- R: Restricted to a particular class of people.

=== North America ===

The Entertainment Software Rating Board (ESRB) is a self-regulatory organization that assigns age and content ratings, enforces industry-adopted advertising guidelines, and ensures responsible online privacy principles for computer and video games and other entertainment software in countries of North America. Despite being self-regulatory, in Canada, games rated by the ESRB are required by law to be rated and/or restricted, though this only varies at a province and territory level.

- E - Suitable for all ages.
- E10+ - Suitable for ages 10 and over.
- T - Suitable for ages 13 and over.
- M - Suitable for ages 17 and over. Cannot be supplied to customers under the age of 17 unless accompanied by a parent or guardian.
- AO - Only suitable for ages 18 and over. Cannot be supplied to customers under the age of 18.
- RP - Content awaiting classification. Sometimes may be marked RP - Likely Mature 17+

=== Russia ===

The Russian Age Rating System (RARS) of information products is a new statutory classification set of rules formed by the Russian Government after enacting in September 2012 a Federal Law of Russian Federation no. 436-FZ of 2010-12-23 “On Protecting of Children from Information Harmful to Their Health and Development” (Russian: Федеральный закон Российской Федерации от 29 декабря 2010 г. N 436-ФЗ «О защите детей от информации, причиняющей вред их здоровью и развитию»), which classifies films, video games and publications for exhibition, sale or hire in Russia since 1 September 2012. The Ministry of Culture provides administrative support to the classification.

In December 2022, the federal government has announced plans to establish a dedicated regulation procedure and age rating specifically for digital products, which include video games. There are concerns this may encompass excessive regulation and costs, as the new regulation will focus on interactive and online elements rather than just audiovisual content.

- 0+ - Products for all ages.
- 6+ - Products for children aged 6 and above.
- 12+ - Products for children aged 12 and above.
- 16+ - Products for children aged 16 and above.
- 18+ - Prohibited for distribution to children.

=== Saudi Arabia ===

The General Authority of Media Regulation (Arabic: الهيئة العامة لتنظيم الإعلام, romanized: alhayyat aleamat litanzim al'iielam) (Gmedia/GAMR) is responsible for the age-ratings of films, television programs and interactive games. In 2025, the age rating criteria was updated along with addition of the 21 rating.

- 3+ - Video game content suitable for ages 3 and above.
- 7+ - Video game content suitable for ages 7 and above.
- 12+ - Video game content suitable for ages 12 and above.
- 16+ - Video game content suitable for ages 16 and above.
- 18+ - Video game content suitable for ages 18 and above.
- 21+ - Video game content suitable for ages 21 and above only.

=== Singapore ===

The Info-communications Media Development Authority (IMDA) is a statutory board of the Singapore Government which regulates films, television programs and video games in Singapore.

- G - Suitable for all ages.
- ADV16 - Suitable for persons 16 and above.
- M18 - Restricted to persons 18 years and above.

=== Slovakia ===

Jednotný systém označovania (English: Unified System of Age Rating/Labeling) (JSO) is a statutory board of Ministry of Culture of Slovakia now under act 328/2023 which regulates age restriction of films, television programs and video games in Slovakia.

The current age ratings are:

- "Teddy bear's head" – Content targeted towards children younger than 12 years.
- U – General audience
- 7 – Not recommended for children younger than 7 years.
- 12 – Not recommended for children younger than 12 years.
- 15 – Not recommended for children younger than 15 years.
- 18 – Prohibited for minors under 18 years of age.

Under current act (328/2023) content descriptors, indicating depiction of violence, discrimination, fear/terror, addiction, sex, coarse language and nudity were added to the statutory board.

In previous act (589/2007), there were educational content age ratings, which are no longer being used:

- -7 – Targeted towards children younger than 7 years.
- 7+ – Appropriate for persons 7 years and over.
- 12+ – Appropriate for persons 12 years and over.
- 15+ – Appropriate for persons 15 years and over.

The labeling was mandatory for all physical releases (games redeemable from gift cards including), but there was no legislative basis for labeling electronic releases (instead, PEGI rating was shown). Under act 78/2023, publishers can now release videogames in Slovakia without JSO rating, if the videogame obtained PEGI rating.

=== South Africa ===

The South African Film and Publication Board (FPB) is a statutory classification body formed by the South African Government under the Films and Publications Act of 1996 which classifies films, publications, and video games for exhibition, sale or hire in South Africa. Distributors and exhibitors are legally compelled to comply with the age ratings.

The ratings, as of August 1, 2022 are;

- PG: Not recommended for young children without Parental Guidance.
- 7–9 PG: Not permitted for children under 7 years of age. Children 7 to 9 should be accompanied before purchasing the game.
- 10–12 PG: Not permitted for children under 10 years of age. Children 10 to 12 should be accompanied before purchasing the game.
- 13: Not permitted for children under 13 years of age.
- 16: Not permitted for children under 16 years of age.
- 18: Not permitted for children.
- X18: Can only be distributed in licensed premises to persons over 18 years of age.
- XX: Not to be distributed or exhibited to public.

=== South Korea ===

The Game Rating and Administration Committee (게임물관리위원회 Geimmul Gwanri Wiwonhoe) (GRAC) is the South Korean video game content rating board. A governmental organization, the GRAC rates video and computer games to inform customers of the nature of game contents.

- ALL - Everyone can play.
- 12 - 12-year-olds can play.
- 15 - 15-year-olds can play.
- 19 - Teenagers and children (under 19) cannot play.

=== Taiwan ===

Game Software Rating Regulations (遊戲軟體分級辦法), also translated as Game Software Rating Management Regulations, is the video game content rating system used in Taiwan.

- 0+ - Appropriate for all ages
- 6+ - Prohibited to anyone under 6
- 12+ - Prohibited to anyone under 12
- 15+ - Prohibited to anyone under 15
- 18+ - Prohibited to anyone under 18

=== United Arab Emirates ===

The National Media Council (Arabic: المجلس الوطني للإعلام, romanized: al-Majlis al-Watani li'al-Ealam) (NMC) was a body of the federal U.A.E. government which regulated all aspects of media production, publication, and media trade in the United Arab Emirates. The body was established under Federal Law (1) of 2006, and had full authority over the media in the country, both commercial and government related.

In 2018, the NMC introduced local age rating systems for various media, including video games available in retail.

In June 2021, the Ministry of Culture & Youth launched the Media Regulatory Office (Arabic: مكتب تنظيم الإعلام, romanized: Maktab Tanzheem al-Ealam) (MRO) to execute a number of functions and tasks previously under the National Media Council, following a restructure of the federal U.A.E. government that was approved in July 2020. In June 2022, the 2018 NMC rating labels for video games began phasing out in favour of new labels reflecting the corporate image of the MRO. The ratings themselves were unchanged. The New Media Law came into force on December 1, 2023, in which the top logo of the label changed to reflect the corporate image of the UAE Media Council which went into effect in 2024. In December 2025, the federal government issued a legislation to establish the National Media Authority (Arabic: الهيئة الوطنية للإعلام, romanized: al-Hai'aa al-Watania li'al-Ealam), effectively replacing the UAE Media Council and its parent entity the National Media Office.

- 3 - Video game content suitable for ages 3 and above.
- 7 - Video game content suitable for ages 7 and above.
- 12 - Video game content suitable for ages 12 and above.
- 16 - Video game content suitable for ages 16 and above.
- 18 - Video game content suitable for ages 18 and above.
- 21 - Video game content suitable for ages 21 and above.

=== Vietnam ===
Video games in Vietnam are classified by age ratings regulated by the government as part of the country's game licensing and content-classification framework. The system is administered by the Authority of Broadcasting and Electronic Information (ABEI) under the Ministry of Culture, Sports and Tourism (Vietnamese: Bộ Văn hóa, Thể thao và Du lịch) (MOCST). Prior to the government restructuring that took effect on 1 March 2025 under Decree No. 55/2025/NĐ-CP, responsibility for the administration of the system was overseen by the former Ministry of Information and Communications (Vietnamese: Bộ Thông tin và Truyền thông) (MIC).

==== Current rating system ====
Effective 25 December 2024, Article 38 of Decree No. 147/2024/NĐ-CP established a four-tier age classification system for online video games. Publishers are required to self-classify games according to statutory criteria, submit the classification as part of the licensing process, and display the assigned rating on game screens and advertisements.

- 00+ – Suitable for all ages; limited to animation simulation games without violence, horror, sexual content, or weapon-based combat.
- 12+ – Suitable for players aged 12 and older; permits limited animated combat while prohibiting sexual content and graphic depictions.
- 16+ – Suitable for players aged 16 and older; permits combat but prohibits sexual content and violent imagery.
- 18+ – Suitable for players aged 18 and older; permits more realistic combat depictions but continues to prohibit explicit sexual content.

==== Historical classification ====
Prior to 25 December 2024, video games were classified under Article 31a of Decree No. 72/2013/NĐ-CP, as amended by Decree No. 27/2018/NĐ-CP, which established a three-tier age classification system consisting of 00+, 12+, and 18+ categories.

- 00+ – Suitable for players of all ages; limited to cartoon simulation games without weapon-based combat, violence, horror elements, or sexual content.
- 12+ – Suitable for players aged 12 and older; permitted limited animated combat while prohibiting sexual content, restricting close-up depictions of weapons, and requiring moderated combat sound effects.
- 18+ – Suitable for adults aged 18 and older; permitted armed combat using weapons but prohibited pornographic activities, sounds, or images.

== Usage ==
The image below presents outdated usage of various video game content rating systems around the world. Countries filled with stripes are using several rating systems.

== See also ==
- International Age Rating Coalition
- Mobile software content rating system
- Motion picture content rating system
- Television content rating system
- Video game controversy
