= Video Game Decency Act =

Proposed legislation in the United States

The Video Game Decency Act of 2007 (H.R. 1531) was a failed proposed piece of U.S. video game legislation originally introduced into the 109th Congress as H.R. 6120 by Congressman Fred Upton on September 29, 2006. The bill was reintroduced into the 110th Congress as H.R. 1531 in March 2007, but died in committee later that year.

== Content ==
The stated aim of the proposed legislation was to "prohibit deceptive acts and practices in the content rating and labeling of video games". It would prevent video game developers from deliberately withholding content from the ESRB with the intention of securing a less restrictive rating. A less restrictive rating would mean that more people could buy copies because the game would be more accessible. The primary target of the legislation was not all video games but those with a "Mature 17+" rating. According to the ESRB, games with this rating have "content that is generally suitable for ages 17 and up and may contain intense violence, blood and gore, sexual content, strong language, drug use, and nudity."

"Upton introduced the legislation with the assistance of Illinois Democrat, representative Bobby Rush, along with ten other co-sponsors". The idea for this proposed legislation arose after Congressman Fred Upton took issue with video game developer Rockstar Games over an incident with their biggest title at the time, Grand Theft Auto: San Andreas. The incident involved a third party modifying the game by creating a minigame called "Hot Coffee" that allowed players to engage in sexual intercourse. Upton believed that Rockstar Games intentionally hid this sexually explicit content from the ESRB to secure a "Mature 17+" rating instead of an "Adults Only" rating. As a result of this incident, Fred Upton later proposed the Video Game Decency Act, which would, pending an investigation by the Federal Trade Commission, punish any video game producer found guilty of deliberately deceiving rating organizations.

Before and during the events leading up to this proposed legislation, the video game industry experienced a significant boom in revenue with the creation of online games. "It grew the gaming industry from tens of billions to hundreds of billions in revenue". Video games began to influence not only pop culture but also the economy. Many people, particularly parents, were concerned about the video game content their children were consuming and called for more regulation. Congressman Upton hoped to capitalize on this sentiment, commenting, “This legislation will restore parents’ trust in a system in which game makers had previously done an end-run around the process to deliver violent and pornographic material to our kids".
