= Theatres Act =

Theatres Act may refer to:

- Theatres Act 1843, a law in the United Kingdom governing the theatre industry
- Theatres Act, 1953, a law in Ontario, Canada now succeeded by the Film Classification Act, 2005
- Theatres Act 1968, a law in the United Kingdom governing stage performances
