= Truth in Video Game Rating Act =

2006 proposed law in the U.S.

- Long title: A bill to direct the Federal Trade Commission to prescribe rules to prohibit deceptive conduct in the rating of video and computer games and for other purposes.
- Announced in: the 109th United States Congress
- Sponsored by: Sam Brownback (R-KS)

Legislative history
- Introduced in the Senate as S.3935 by Sam Brownback (R-KS) on September 26, 2006; Committee consideration by Committee on Commerce, Science, and Transportation

The United States Truth in Video Game Rating Act (S.3935) was a failed bill that was introduced by then Senator Sam Brownback (R-KS) on September 26, 2006. The act would require the ESRB to have access to the full content of and hands-on time with the games it was to rate, rather than simply relying on the video demonstrations submitted by developers and publishers. In addition, the ESRB would become oversighted by the Government Accountability Office (GAO), and the Federal Trade Commission would define details of content for the ESRB ratings. Brownback said of the bill's introduction, "The current video game ratings system needs improvement because reviewers do not see the full content of games and don't even play the games they are supposed to rate. For video game ratings to be meaningful and worthy of a parent's trust, the game ratings must be more objective and accurate."

The bill was one of several proposed federal and state legislation that were introduced following the media attention from the "Hot Coffee" scenes in Grand Theft Auto: San Andreas in mid-2005, and the ESRB re-rating of The Elder Scrolls IV: Oblivion in 2006. In the case of "Hot Coffee", while the sexually-explicit content had been originally hidden by Rockstar Games at release, modders had been able to patch the game to show it, causing the ESRB to re-evaluate the game from Mature to Adults-Only. Oblivion had been rated as Teen but was changed to Mature after a mod revealed that the game included art assets with violent depictions and nudity.

Prior to Brownback's bill, Senators Hillary Clinton, Joe Lieberman, and Evan Bayh had introduced the Family Entertainment Protection Act in December 2005, which called for a federal mandate enforcement of the ESRB ratings system in order to protect children from inappropriate content, though the legislation failed to pass. The ESRB had been summoned to testify before Congress on these matters in June 2006, where ESRB president Patricia Vance stated that the group had changed its rules, and that, "After a game ships, if disclosure is found to have been incomplete, recent enhancements to the ESRB enforcement system will soon allow for the imposition of fines up to USD 1 million." Vance also explained the difficulties of reviewing every element of a game, some which take more than 100 hours to complete and would require professional players, well beyond the experience of the average video game player.

This bill was unacted upon during its original session and was reintroduced by Senator Brownback on February 14, 2007, under the same title "the Truth in Video Game Rating Act" with a new session number (S.568). The bill remained in the Senate Committee on Commerce, Science and Transportation and expired at the end of the 110th Congress without further action.
