= Joe Lieberman 2004 presidential campaign =

American political campaign

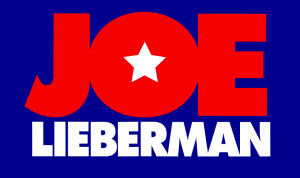
- Campaign: 2004 United States presidential election (Democratic Party primaries)
- Candidate: Joe Lieberman; U.S. Senator from Connecticut (1989-2013)
- Affiliation: Democratic Party
- Announced: January 13, 2003
- Suspended: February 3, 2004

Website
- joe2004.com (archived - April 1, 2003)

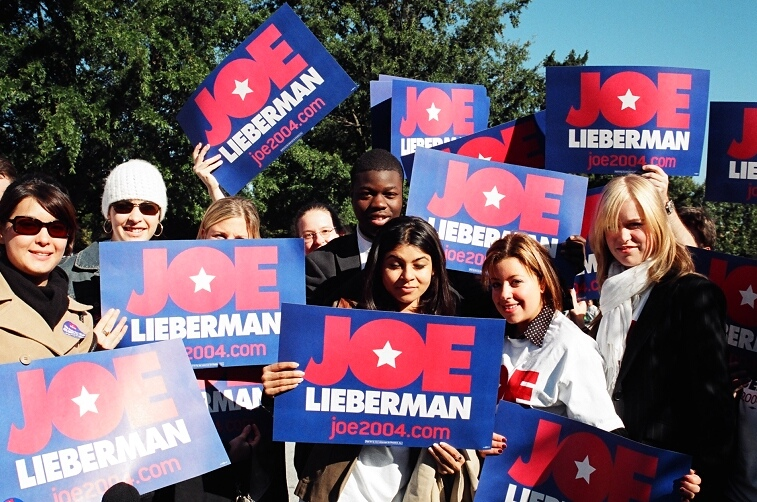
Lieberman supporters

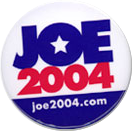
campaign button

The 2004 presidential campaign of Joe Lieberman, the long-time United States senator from Connecticut and the vice-presidential nominee under Al Gore in the previous election, began on January 13, 2003, when he announced his intention to seek the Democratic nomination as a candidate in the 2004 presidential election. Describing his presidential hopes, Lieberman opined that his historically hawkish stance would appeal to voters. Prior to his defeat in New Hampshire, Lieberman famously declared his campaign was picking up "Joementum". On February 3, 2004, Lieberman withdrew his candidacy after failing to win any of the five primaries or two caucuses held that day. He acknowledged to the Hartford Courant that his support for the war in Iraq was a large part of his undoing with voters. Lieberman's former running candidate Al Gore did not support Lieberman's presidential run, and in December 2003 endorsed Howard Dean's candidacy, saying "This is about all of us and all of us need to get behind the strongest candidate [Dean]."

== Political positions ==
=== Domestic policy ===
==== Affirmative action ====
In a 1995 speech before the National Press Club, Lieberman said, "this business of deciding by group, the argument that some make that some groups are genetically less able than others. That's an un-American argument." Affirmative action programs "must change because they are inconsistent with the law and basic American values of equal treatment and opportunity." He also stated that he was "against group preferences".

In 1996, he expressed support for California's Proposition 209, which eliminated state and local government affirmative action programs in the areas of public employment, public education, and public contracting to the extent these programs involve "preferential treatment based on race, sex, gender, color, ethnicity, or national origin." "Affirmative action is dividing us in ways its creators could never have intended.", he said.

Since 2000, Lieberman rescinded his support for the proposition, saying that he expressed support "without understand[ing] the intent of Proposition 209", and renounced any support for Proposition 209. In the 2000 campaign, Lieberman assured the black voters, "I have supported affirmative action, I do support affirmative action, and I will support affirmative action because history and current reality make it necessary."

In 2003, Lieberman criticized Bush's affirmative action policy. In 2004, he reiterated his support, saying, "I support affirmative action programs, including in appropriate instances consideration of race and gender in government contracting decisions, when the affirmative action program is designed to remedy the effects of past discrimination."

Lieberman has stated that he wants to increase subsidies for women-owned non-profit business, and he voted "yes" on setting aside 10% of highway funds for minorities and women.

==== Consumer protection ====
Lieberman was one of four Senate Democrats to side with Republicans in 1995 in voting to limit punitive damage awards in product liability cases.

In February 2005, breaking ranks with fellow Senate Democrats, Lieberman voted for the Class Action Fairness Act of 2005, S. 5, a bill designed to curtail the ability of plaintiffs to file class action lawsuits against corporations in federal courts. The bill was backed by the White House and business groups as an essential tort reform measure that would reduce what they said was a debilitating number of frivolous lawsuits. The bill was opposed by consumer advocacy groups and trial lawyers who argued that many valid claims against corporations would be dismissed, leaving consumers without legal recourse.

==== Education ====
Lieberman championed experimental voucher programs, which would redirect some education funding directly to parents, who could apply it towards paying for the public or private school of their choice.

Lieberman has described Bush's "No Child Left Behind" plan as a "progressive piece of legislation" which has been insufficiently funded. He said, "A month after he signed the law, President Bush under funded it by $6 billion less than was promised in the legislation. This is creating greater pressures on our schools to perform and educate our kids - which is appropriate - but without giving them sufficient resources to make it happen." He has repeatedly criticized the administration to this effect.

With Lynne Cheney, Richard Lamm, Saul Bellow, and others, Lieberman co-founded the American Council of Trustees and Alumni (ACTA), a controversial educational organization which released the post-9/11 report titled "Defending Civilization: How Our Universities Are Failing America and What Can Be Done About It" that criticized universities for evidence of anti-Americanism.

==== Entertainment industry ====
Lieberman has been critical of the entertainment media. On November 29, 2005, he co-sponsored the Family Entertainment Protection Act, which was introduced by Hillary Clinton, S.2126. The act is intended to protect children from what he says is inappropriate content found in video games. He has denounced the violence contained in video games and has tried regulating sales of violent video games to minors, arguing that games should have to be labeled based upon age-appropriateness. Regarding Grand Theft Auto, he said, "The player is rewarded for attacking a woman, pushing her to the ground, kicking her repeatedly and then ultimately killing her, shooting her over and over again. I call on the entertainment companies—they've got a right to do that, but they have a responsibility not to do it if we want to raise the next generation of our sons to treat women with respect." He voted for the Communications Decency Act.

==== Environment ====
Lieberman co-sponsored the 1990 Clean Air Act, a 1991 legislation intended to give consumers more information about the dangers of pesticides. He has addressed the need to limit global warming.

Lieberman has stated that the US population has to accept responsibility for global warming, and voted "yes" on banning drilling in the Arctic National Wildlife Refuge. He also voted "yes" on reducing oil usage by 40% by 2025 (instead of 5%). He voted against Gale Norton as Secretary of Interior. He even voted for funding for greater risk assessment by the EPA. Lieberman has even gone as far as saying that he wants to raise mileage standard to 40 mpg. Lieberman voted for the administration-backed Energy Policy Act of 2005; facing criticism, Lieberman called the bill imperfect but good for Connecticut, citing a saving of $800 million for Connecticut electricity customers. Lieberman has been a vocal critic of Bush's environmental policy.

==== "Gang of 14" ====
On May 23, 2005, Lieberman was one of fourteen senators, dubbed the "Gang of 14," who forged a compromise on the Democrats' use of the judicial filibuster, thus avoiding the Republican leadership's implementation of the so-called "nuclear option". Under the agreement, the Democrats would exercise the power to filibuster a Bush judicial nominee only in an "extraordinary circumstance," and three of the filibustered Bush appellate court nominees – (Janice Rogers Brown, Priscilla Richman and William Pryor) – would receive a vote by the full Senate, which resulted in their confirmation. Lieberman refused to support a filibuster against Supreme Court justice nominee Samuel Alito. Alito was confirmed by the U.S. Senate on January 31, 2006, by a vote of 58–42, becoming the court's 110th justice. Lieberman voted against the Alito confirmation in the final Senate vote. On John Roberts's nomination as chief justice, Lieberman believed that Roberts did not seem to be the kind of right-wing candidate the "Gang of 14" feared the president would select. Lieberman said he thought Roberts was a "decent guy," but also said that it was too early to draw further conclusions. Roberts was confirmed by the Senate on September 29, 2005, by a 78–22 vote, becoming the court's 17th chief justice. Lieberman voted for confirming Roberts.

==== LGBT rights ====
In 2004, Lieberman scored a rating of 88/100 by the Human Rights Campaign (HRC), one of the largest civil rights organization working to achieve gay, lesbian, bisexual and transgender equality."

Lieberman voted "no" on constitutionally banning same-sex marriage. In 2003, in response to the Massachusetts ruling that sanctions gay marriage, Lieberman stated, "although I am opposed to gay marriage, I have also long believed that states have the right to adopt for themselves laws that allow same-sex unions. I will oppose any attempts by the right wing to change the Constitution in response to today's Massachusetts Supreme Court ruling, which would be unnecessary and divisive."

Lieberman cosponsored the Domestic Partners Benefits and Obligations Act of 2003, which provided the same benefits to domestic partners of federal employees as spouses currently have. In 1996, he cosponsored the Employment Nondiscrimination Act (ENDA), which would prohibit employment discrimination based on sexual orientation. Lieberman voted in favor of the Early Treatment for HIV Act of 2003, which provided Medicaid treatment for people diagnosed with HIV. He has adopted a non-discriminatory policy in employment decisions, which include sexual orientation and gender. Although Lieberman had no military personnel policy experience, he was among the minority in the Senate in 1993 to vote in support of President Clinton's proposal to let gays and lesbians serve openly in the military. However, he supported the Defense of Marriage Act and "Don't ask, don't tell."

In August 1994, Jesse Helms (R-NC) and Bob Smith (R-NH) proposed an amendment, S.AMDT.2434, to Elementary and Secondary Education Reauthorization (ESEA) - S.1513 - that would prevent federal funding for schools that "implement or carry out a program or activity that has either the purpose or effect of encouraging or supporting homosexuality as a positive lifestyle." Lieberman voted for the amendment. He voted for prohibiting HIV-positive immigrants from entering the US and against a measure to grant domestic-partner benefits to District of Columbia employees.

==== Gun control ====
Lieberman received a failing grade from the National Rifle Association but a 90% from the Coalition to Stop Gun Violence. He has sought to ban guns in schools and places of worship. He has voted against prohibiting most lawsuits against gun manufacturers, but cast another vote immunizing gun manufacturers from lawsuits over gun violence. He has voted to require background checks at gun shows and against allowing guns to be sold without trigger locks.

In 2000, he opposed Al Gore's position to require a license to purchase a new handgun. Although they disagreed on this issue, Gore asked Lieberman not to change his position.

Lieberman's general pro-gun control stance has not prevented him from earning the nicknames "Joe Gun" and "Cowboy Joe" in reference to his straightforward, aggressive approach to lawmaking.

==== Health care and reproductive rights ====
In March 2006, according to The New Haven Register, when asked about the approach of the Catholic hospitals on contraceptives for rape victims, Lieberman said he believes Catholic hospitals that refuse to give contraceptives to rape victims for "principled reasons" shouldn't be forced to do so. "In Connecticut, it shouldn't take more than a short ride to get to another hospital," he said.

During his 2004 campaign, Lieberman said, "The day I walk into the Oval Office, the first thing I'm going to do is rescind the Bush administration restrictions on embryonic stem cell research." He has criticized Bush's recent veto of the embryonic stem cell research.

Lieberman has been critical of Bush's Medicare plan, arguing that in its current state, it does not provide sufficiently for our nation's elderly.

In 2005, Lieberman introduced S. 975, the Project BioShield II Act of 2005, to provide incentives to increase research by private sector entities to develop medical countermeasures to counter bioterrorism threats. The bill seeks to grant liability protection for these drugs and an extension of patents to companies producing drugs needed in case of a bioterrorism attack.

Lieberman joined a few other Democrats, Republican Florida Governor Jeb Bush and the Republican Congress as a vocal supporter of intervention in the Terri Schiavo case.

When control of the Senate switched from Republicans to Democrats in June 2001, Lieberman became Chairman of the Governmental Affairs Committee, with oversight responsibilities for a broad range of government activities. When Republicans regained control of the Senate in January 2003, Lieberman resumed his role as ranking minority member of the committees he had once chaired.

==== Social Security ====
Lieberman cosponsored a resolution urging the Congress to reject the Bush administration Social Security Commission's report.

Lieberman described the debate as "an ongoing problem, and we'd be wise to deal with it." He told The Hartford Courant in January 2005 when asked about Social Security, "if we can figure out a way to help people through private accounts or something else, great." Although Lieberman praised Lindsey Graham (R-SC) for trying to fashion a bipartisan social security plan, he ultimately voted against the Bush Social Security plan.

Lieberman has toyed with the idea of switching his affiliation to Republican, especially if Senate Democrats go what he sees as too far in ending the War in Iraq. but this would not cause the Republicans to become the majority party during the 110th session of Congress.

He helped defeat the Financial Accounting Standards Board (FASB) proposal of requiring the report of the costs of stock options as a business expense during the mid-1990s. During an interview with PBS after the Enron scandal, Lieberman defended his position, saying, "it was a good action." Facing the growing stock option scandals, Lieberman acknowledged that "clearly a disproportionate percent of the options went to a small percentage of executives. That was disappointing."

==== Other ====
Lieberman has voted against amending the U.S. Constitution to make it constitutional to criminalize flag desecration.

=== Foreign policy ===
==== Committee on the Present Danger ====
At the 20 July launching of the 2004 Committee on the Present Danger, Joe Lieberman and Senator Jon Kyl were identified as the honorary co-chairs. The Committee on the Present Danger (CPD) is a hawkish "advocacy organization" first founded in 1950 and re-formed in 1976 to push for larger defense budgets and arms buildups, to counter the Soviet Union.

==== Iraq War ====
Lieberman sponsored S.J. Res.46, the Senate version of H.J. Res. 114, that is, the Authorization for Use of Military Force Against Iraq Resolution of 2002, also called the Iraq Resolution.

Lieberman defended his support of the Iraq Resolution; in a November 29, 2005 op-ed piece for The Wall Street Journal, he praised the efforts of the U.S. military in the occupation of Iraq and criticized both parties:

I am disappointed by Democrats who are more focused on how President Bush took America into the war in Iraq almost three years ago, and by Republicans who are more worried about whether the war will bring them down in next November's elections, than they are concerned about how we continue the progress in Iraq in the months and years ahead.

Later, on December 7, 2005, Lieberman said, "It is time for Democrats who distrust President Bush to acknowledge that he will be Commander-in-Chief for three more critical years, and that in matters of war we undermine Presidential credibility at our nation's peril. It is time for Republicans in the White House and Congress who distrust Democrats to acknowledge that greater Democratic involvement and support in the war in Iraq is critical to rebuilding the support of the American people that is essential to our success in that war. It is time for Americans and we their leaders to start working together again on the war on terrorism. To encourage that new American partnership, I propose that the President and the leadership of Congress establish a bipartisan Victory in Iraq Working Group, composed of members of both parties in Congress and high ranking national security officials of the Bush Administration."

Senate Minority Leader Harry Reid expressed disappointment with Lieberman, saying, "I've talked to Senator Lieberman, and unfortunately he is at a different place on Iraq than the majority of the American people." House Minority Leader Nancy Pelosi added, "I completely disagree with Lieberman. I believe that we have a responsibility to speak out if we think that the course of action that our country is not making the American people safer, making our military stronger and making the region more stable." Lieberman responded, "I've had this position for a long time – that we need to finish the job."

Lieberman's defense of the administration resulted in speculation that he was attempting to position himself to replace Secretary of Defense Donald Rumsfeld or another high-ranking government official, but Lieberman has denied having any desire for this. In 2005, media reports suggested that Lieberman might replace Secretary of Defense Donald Rumsfeld; Lieberman responded with, "It's a total fantasy, there's just no truth to it."

On June 22, 2006, Lieberman voted against two Democratic amendments to the annual defense appropriations bill, including S. 2766, which called for a withdrawal of U.S. troops from Iraq. S.2766 did not set a withdrawal deadline, but urged President Bush to start pulling U.S. forces out of Iraq in 2006. Both amendments were defeated in the Senate, 60–39.

==== Free trade ====
Lieberman supported the North American Free Trade Agreement (NAFTA) and continues to do so. During a 2004 Democratic presidential primary debate in South Carolina, he said, "though it's cost some jobs, has actually netted out 900,000 new jobs that were created by NAFTA". Lieberman also voted for the Dominican Republic–Central America Free Trade Agreement (DR-CAFTA) in 2005.

Lieberman is also the co-author of the US-China Relations Act that would create new incentives in bilateral relations with China. He voted for the U.S./China World Trade Organization (WTO) Accession agreement in 2000.

==== Israel ====
In 2002, Lieberman sponsored a pro-Israel U.S. Senate Resolution (S. Res. 247) regarding the Middle East Conflict, "expressing solidarity with Israel in its constant efforts to fight against terror".

==== Homeland security ====
As chairman of the Senate Committee on Homeland Security and Governmental Affairs (formerly the Governmental Affairs Committee) in 2001, Lieberman proposed forming the Department of Homeland Security, a proposal that passed into law in 2002. As ranking member of the committee from 2003 to 2007, he played a leading role in the passage of homeland security legislation such as the Intelligence Reform and Terrorism Prevention Act, the SAFE Port Act, and the Post-Katrina Emergency Management Reform Act, and in the investigation of the Bush administration's response to Hurricane Katrina. In January 2007 he became chairman again of the Senate Homeland Security and Governmental Affairs Committee, where he led efforts to pass the Implementing Recommendations of the 9/11 Commission Act of 2007.

==== Geneva Conventions ====
Lieberman supports the Alberto Gonzales policy memo on the application of provisions of the Geneva Conventions. He believes "the decision was, in my opinion, a reasonable one, and ultimately a progressive one." He agrees with Gonzales in describing certain provisions of Geneva Conventions, specifically "that a captured enemy be afforded such things as commissary privileges, script advances of monthly pay, athletic uniforms and scientific instruments" as "quaint". He also agrees with the legal decision that al Qaeda's members "were not entitled to prisoner of war status." In 2006, the United States Supreme Court ruled in Hamdan v. Rumsfeld that "at least" Common Article 3 of the Geneva Conventions is applicable to combatants "in the territory of" a signatory of the Conventions.
