= Entertainment Software Rating Board =

North American self-regulatory organization

- Formation: September 16, 1994; 32 years ago
- Type: Non-profit, self-regulatory
- Purpose: Rating of video game content
- Location: New York City, US
- Region served: North America
- Key people: Patricia Vance (president, CEO)
- Parent organization: Entertainment Software Association
- Website: esrb.org

The Entertainment Software Rating Board (ESRB) is a self-regulatory organization that assigns age and content ratings to consumer video games in the United States and Canada. The ESRB was established in 1994 by the Entertainment Software Association (ESA), formerly the Interactive Digital Software Association (IDSA), in response to criticism of controversial video games with excessively violent or sexual content, particularly after the 1993 congressional hearings following the releases of Mortal Kombat and Night Trap for home consoles and Doom for home computers. The industry, pressured with potential government oversight of video game ratings from these hearings, established both the IDSA and the ESRB within it to create a voluntary rating system based on the Motion Picture Association film rating system with additional considerations for video game interactivity.

The board assigns ratings to games based on their content and the context in which it is presented to the player, using a combination of five age-based rating categories intended to aid consumers in determining a game's content and suitability, along with a system of "content descriptors" which detail specific types of content present in a particular game. More recently, the ratings also include "Interactive Elements" for games with online interactivity or in-game monetization. The ratings are determined by a combination of material provided by the game's publisher in both questionnaires and video footage of the game, and a review of this material by a panel of trained raters who assign it a rating. The ratings are designed to help parents make informed decisions about purchasing age-appropriate games for their children. Once a game is rated, the ESRB maintains a code of ethics for the advertising and promotion of video games—ensuring that marketing materials for games are targeted to appropriate audiences.

The ESRB rating system is enforced via the voluntary leverage of the video game and retail industries in the subscribing countries for physical releases; most stores require customers to present photo identification when purchasing games carrying the ESRB's highest age ratings, and do not stock games which have not been rated. Additionally, major console manufacturers will not license games for their systems unless they carry ESRB ratings, while console manufacturers and most stores will refuse to stock games that the ESRB has rated as being appropriate for adults only. More recently, the ESRB began offering a system to automatically assign ratings for digitally-distributed games and mobile apps, which utilizes a survey answered by the product's publisher as opposed to a manual assessment by ESRB staff, allowing online storefronts to filter and restrict titles based on the ESRB. Through the International Age Rating Coalition (IARC), this method can generate equivalent ratings for other territories. Alongside its game rating operation, the ESRB also provides certification services for online privacy on websites and mobile apps. There have been attempts to pass federal and state laws to force retailers into compliance with the ESRB, but the 2011 Supreme Court case Brown v. Entertainment Merchants Association ruled that video games are protected speech, and such laws are therefore unconstitutional.

Due to the level of consumer and retail awareness of the rating system, along with the organization's efforts to ensure that retailers comply with the rating system and that publishers comply with its marketing code, the ESRB has considered its system to be effective, and was praised by the Federal Trade Commission for being the "strongest" self-regulatory organization in the entertainment sector. Despite its positive reception, the ESRB has still faced criticism from politicians and other watchdog groups for the structure of its operations, particularly after a sexually-explicit minigame was found within 2004 game Grand Theft Auto: San Andreas—which was inaccessible from the game but could be accessed using a user-created modification.

The ESRB has been accused of having a conflict of interest because of its vested interest in the video game industry, and that it does not rate certain games, such as the Grand Theft Auto series, harshly enough for their violent or sexual content in order to protect their commercial viability. Contrarily, other critics have argued that, at the same time, the ESRB rates certain games too strongly for their content, and that its influence has stifled the viability of adult-oriented video games due to the board's restrictions on how they are marketed and sold.

== History ==
=== Background ===
Video games with objectionable content date back as far as 1976; the arcade game Death Race required users to run over "gremlins" with a vehicle and avoid the gravestones they leave behind. Although its graphics were relatively primitive, the game's overall theme and the sound effects made when gremlins were killed were considered disturbing by players, prompting media attention. A developer known as Mystique became known for making sexually explicit adult video games for the Atari 2600 console, but garnered the most attention with its 1982 game Custer's Revenge, which featured a crude simulation of the rape of a Native American woman. Atari received numerous complaints about the game, and responded by trying to sue the game's makers.

A 1983 industry crash, caused by the market being overrun with low-quality products, prompted a higher degree of regulation by future console manufacturers: when the Nintendo Entertainment System (NES) was launched in the United States in 1985, Nintendo of America instituted requirements and restrictions on third-party developers, including the requirement for all games to be licensed by the company. The console itself also included a lockout chip to enforce this requirement and prevent the console from loading unlicensed games. Such leverage on developers has since become a standard practice among console makers, although Nintendo of America also had stringent content policies, frequently censoring blood, sexual content, and references to religion, tobacco and alcohol from games released on its consoles in the United States.

When asked in 1987 about the suitability of a film-like rating system for video games, a representative of the Software Publishers Association said that "Adult computer software is nothing to worry about. It's not an issue that the government wants to spend any time with ... They just got done with a big witchhunt in the music recording industry, and they got absolutely nowhere". The association did recommend voluntary warnings for games like Leisure Suit Larry in the Land of the Lounge Lizards (1987).

=== Formation and early years ===
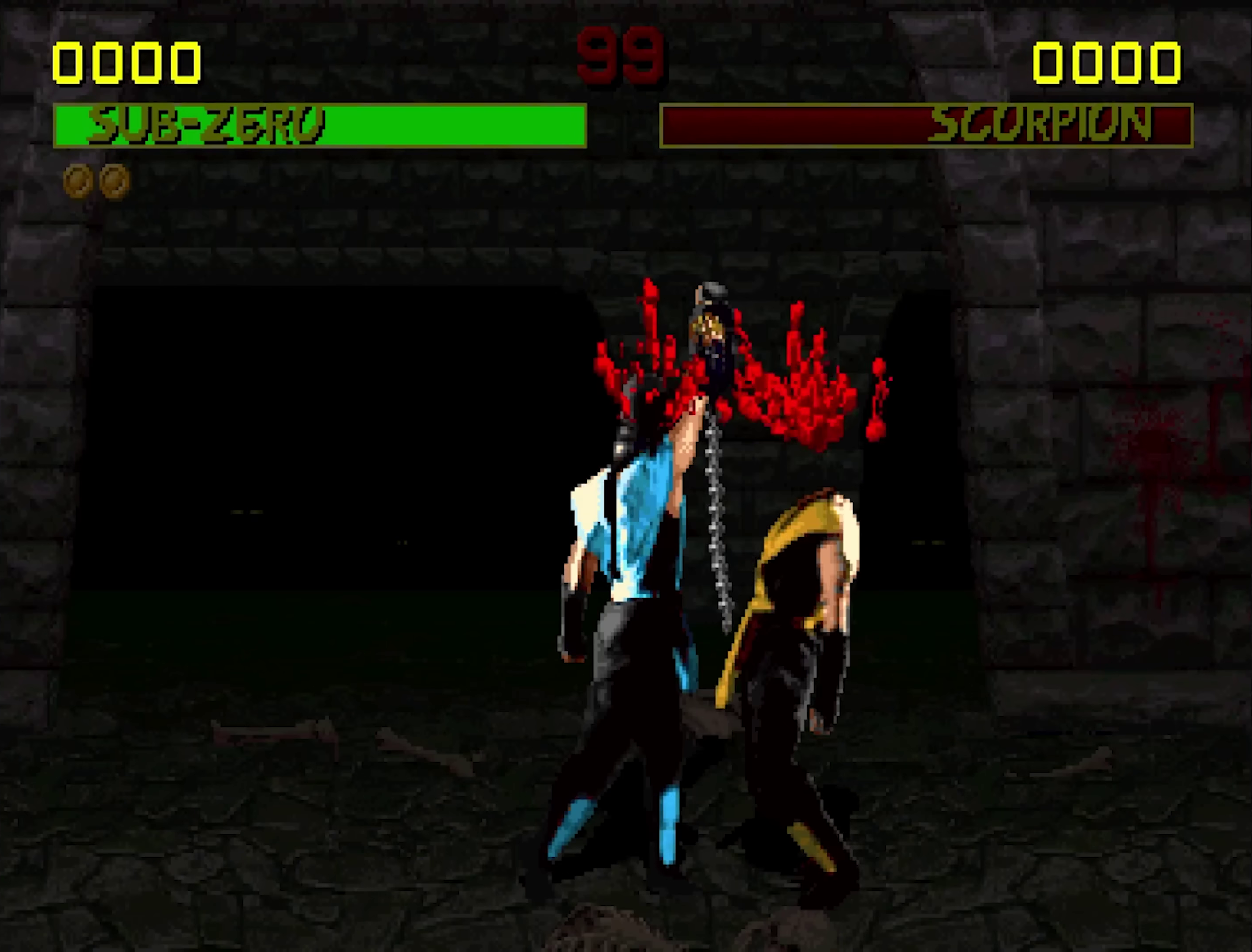
A fatality finishing move in the first Mortal Kombat (1992). The violence and gore associated with the move was one of the triggering factors into the U.S. Senate investigation into the lack of video game ratings.

Video games' progression into the 1990s brought dramatic increases in graphics and sound capabilities, and the ability to use full-motion video (FMV) content in games. In the United States Senate, Democratic Senators Joe Lieberman of Connecticut and Herb Kohl of Wisconsin led hearings on video game violence and the corruption of society which began in 1993. Two games of this era were specifically cited in the hearings for their content; the fighting game Mortal Kombat featured realistic, digitized sprites of live-action actors, blood, and the ability to use violent "fatality" moves to defeat opponents, while Night Trap featured 90 minutes of FMV content, with scenes that were considered to be sexually suggestive and exploitive. Both Nintendo and Sega had differing views on objectionable content in video games; a port of Mortal Kombat for the Super NES was censored to remove the game's overly violent content, whereas the port for Sega consoles retained much of this content, which helped increase sales. In May 1993, British censors banned Night Trap from being sold to children under 15 years old in the United Kingdom, which was an influence on Sega's decision to create an age rating system.

At the time of the 1993 hearings, there was no industry-wide standard in place for rating video games, which was a point of contention at the hearings. Sega had implemented its own voluntary ratings system, the Videogame Rating Council (VRC), largely to rate games released for its own consoles, which Nintendo largely disputed. The 3DO Interactive Multiplayer platform had its own age ratings voluntarily determined by game publishers, and the Recreational Software Advisory Council (RSAC) was formed for rating PC games, which used a system that rated the intensity of specific classes of objectionable content, but did not use age recommendations. However, Lieberman did not believe that these systems were sufficient, and in February 1994, threatened to propose the creation of a federal commission for regulating and rating video games. Stores like Toys "R" Us refused to sell titles they deemed were too violent for children following the hearings.

With the threat of federal regulations, a group of major video game developers and publishers, including Acclaim Entertainment and Electronic Arts along with Nintendo and Sega, formed a political trade group known as the Interactive Digital Software Association in April 1994, with a goal to create a self-regulatory framework for assessing and rating video games. While Sega had proposed that the industry use its VRC rating system, Nintendo representatives objected to the idea because they did not want to associate themselves with the work of their main competitor; instead, a vendor-neutral rating system known as the Entertainment Software Rating Board (ESRB) was developed. The formation of the ESRB was officially announced to Congress on July 29, 1994. The ESRB was officially launched on September 16, 1994; its system consisted of five age-based ratings; "Early Childhood", "Kids to Adults" (later renamed "Everyone" in 1998), "Teen", "Mature", and "Adults Only". The ESRB was the first rating system to also use "descriptors" with brief explanations of the content contained in a game, as the ESRB found that parents wanted to have knowledge of this type of content before they purchased games for their children.

The U.S. arcade gaming industry did not adopt the ESRB system, with the American Amusement Machine Association (AAMA) having cited "fundamental differences between the coin-operated and consumer segments of the video game industry" as reasoning. The AAMA, the Amusement & Music Operators Association, and the International Association for the Leisure and Entertainment Industry, adopted their own three-tier "Parental Advisory System" in 1994, which uses three color-coded levels of content intensity (designated by green, yellow, and red stickers affixed to arcade cabinet artwork).

=== Expansion and recent developments ===
Alongside its efforts to classify video games, the ESRB also formed a division known as Entertainment Software Rating Board Interactive (ESRBi), which rated internet content using a similar system to its video game ratings. ESRBi also notably partnered with the internet service provider America Online to integrate these ratings into its existing parental controls. ESRBi was discontinued in 2003.

In 2002, Dr. Arthur Pober, the original president of the ESRB, stepped down so he could focus on academics. In November 2002, he was formally replaced by Patricia Vance, who formerly worked for The Princeton Review and The Walt Disney Company. In March 2005, the ESRB introduced a new rating, "Everyone 10+", designating games with content of a relatively higher impact than those of games rated "Everyone", but still not high enough to garner a "Teen" rating. The first games to receive this rating was Donkey Kong Jungle Beat and Shadow the Hedgehog .

In response to the growth of smartphone use, in November 2011, CTIA, a group of major U.S. companies representing the wireless industry, and ESRB announced the co-development of a free, voluntary ratings process for mobile app stores. The system uses ESRB's icons and content descriptors, along with four additional "Interactive Elements" ("Digital Purchases", "Shares Info," "Shares Location," and "Users Interact") to inform users of an app's behavior in regards to data collection and interactions with others. Verizon Wireless and T-Mobile US were among the first to implement the system for their own application storefronts, and Microsoft's Windows Phone Marketplace already supported ESRB ratings upon its introduction. ESRB president Patricia Vance explained that the partnership was intended to help broaden the ESRB's reach into the mobile market, and that "consumers, especially parents, benefit from having a consistently applied set of ratings for games rather than a fragmented array of different systems."

In November 2012, the ESRB and other video game ratings boards, including PEGI, the Australian Classification Board, and USK among others, established a consortium known as the International Age Rating Coalition (IARC). The group sought to design an online, questionnaire-based rating process for digitally-distributed video games that could generate ratings for multiple video game ratings organizations at once. The resulting ratings information is tied to a unique code, which can then be used by online storefronts to display the corresponding rating for the user's region. The three major console makers, Microsoft, Sony, and Nintendo have all committed to supporting IARC for their digital storefronts, including ESRB ratings for North American markets. Google Play Store was updated in March 2015 to adopt and display ESRB ratings for apps in North America through IARC. Windows Store also implemented IARC in January 2016. Apple's App Store still uses its own generic age rating system and does not use the ESRB or IARC systems.

== Rating process ==
While the ESRB is technically part of the ESA, the rating authority is self-funded and operates independently of the trade group to assess and apply industry-wide standards for video games. The ESRB operates out of offices in New York City.

To obtain a rating for a game, a publisher submits a detailed questionnaire (a "Long Form") that describes the graphic and extreme content found in the game to the ESRB, along with a video (VHS, DVD, video file, or other means) that demonstrates this content which can include gameplay footage and in-game cutscenes. This information includes the game's context, storyline, gameplay mechanics, reward system, unlockable and otherwise "hidden" content, and other elements that may affect its rating; the ESRB seeks to have enough information on context of the extreme content to be able to judge its appropriateness. The video game publisher may also provide printed copies of the game's script and lyrics from songs in the game. The publisher also pays an upfront fee for obtaining the ESRB rating.

After the information is reviewed for completeness and appropriateness by ESRB staff, the material is sent to at least three different raters, who are treated anonymously and prevented from talking directly with the publishers through the ESRB offices. Raters represent various demographics, including parents, along with casual and "hardcore" gamers. ESRB employs several full-time raters, who are supported by specially trained part-time raters. The raters discuss what the most appropriate and "helpful" rating for the game would be, based on the footage and details provided. Most ESRB reviews at this stage take approximately 45 minutes, though some cases based on material provided by publisher or by the type of game have taken up to four hours over multiple days to complete. One rater is designated as the lead for each game reviewed. The lead rater writes up the report and conclusions of the process, and works with other ESRB staff members to do a parity analysis to make sure the assigned ratings align with ratings from similar games in the past. Overall, between the raters' discussion and final reporting, the process takes about a week to complete.

At times during the internal review, the raters may find inconsistencies between the details on the Long Form and in the video footage. Should these occur, the ESRB contacts the publisher to ask for clarification of these matters, typically which are then resolved quickly. In some cases, the omission of certain material on the Long Form or in the footage may be significant. For any publisher, the ESRB gives them a number of warnings of such omissions which help the publisher to better prepare future submissions, but should a publisher make such omissions multiple times, the ESRB will fine them for subsequent infractions.

The publisher receives this final report of what rating the game will carry. According to the ESRB, most publishers have a good expectation of what they will be assigned and do not challenge what they are given. However, if a publisher does not agree with the rating that they were assigned, they may ask questions about why a rating was given and work back and forth with the ESRB to adjust it. Alternatively, the publisher may edit the game and submit the revised version for a new rating, which restarts the process. In such cases, the ESRB does not inform the publisher of what content must be changed or removed to change the rating, but only which content triggered certain rating elements, leaving the choice to the publisher to resolve. For example, an initial cut of The Punisher was given an AO rating due to the extremely violent nature of certain scenes contained within the game. To lessen their impact, the developer changed these scenes to be rendered in black and white: the revised cut of the game was re-submitted, and received the M rating. There is also an appeals process, but as of 2007, it has never been used.

When the game is ready for release, the publisher sends copies of the final version of the game to the ESRB, who reviews the game's packaging, and a random number of games they receive are play tested for a more thorough review, typically for up to four hours. Penalties apply to publishers who misrepresent the content of their games, including the potential for fines up to US $1 million and a product recall to reprint proper labels, if deemed necessary. With newer games often having large content patches at release as well as downloadable content, season passes, and other games as a service updates, the ESRB will flag these games in their system and periodically check on the new content to make sure it remains within the established rating.

The ESRB typically posts rating information for new titles on its website 30 days after the rating process is complete; in 2008, in response to incidents where this practice inadvertently leaked information about games that had not yet been announced, the ESRB began to allow publishers to place embargoes on the release of ratings information until a game is officially announced.

=== Associated media review ===
Besides evaluating games, the ESRB also oversees the marketing and advertising materials released for games that have undergone the ESRB rating process or in progress. This includes making sure that such material includes the given ESRB rating, and that the marketing has been tailored appropriately to its target audience, particularly for television spots. The ESRB provides guidance for what type of content is reasonable for certain types of games, what type of content may be inappropriately gratuitous, and the presentation of the ESRB rating within the work. The ESRB will go back and forth with publishers when there is objectionable elements within the marketing to correct these issues.

=== Shortened processes ===
In April 2011, the ESRB introduced its Short Form, a free, streamlined, automated process for assigning ratings for console downloadable games as a way to address the rapidly growing volume of digitally-delivered games. Rather than having raters review each product (the Long Form), publishers of these games complete a series of multiple-choice questions that address content across relevant categories, including violence, sexual content, language, etc. The responses automatically determine the game's rating category and content descriptors. Games rated via this process may be tested post-release to ensure that content was properly disclosed. The survey-based method is also used in the ESRB/CTIA and IARC rating programs for mobile apps. The ESRB phased out the Short Form for digital-only games, instead directing those developers and publishers to use the similar free questionnaire-driven IARC program, which was being adopted beyond mobile app stores, including the Nintendo eShop and PlayStation Store, as a requirement for posting, and which automatically are accepted by several national-level rating boards, including the ESRB.

In response to concerns from Sony on the growing number of indie game titles that were receiving physical releases alongside retail ones, the ESRB began instituting new rules around August 2017 that any retail product was mandated to undergo the standard Long Form review for the game, disallowing the use of the Short Form for such titles. Alongside this, ESRB introduced a "value tier" for the Long Form review process for games developed at lower budgets (under $1 million), with a cost of $3000 for obtaining the retail rating. This decision has impacted the choice of several boutique indie game publishers, who have either cancelled plans for retail versions or had to stop selling retail versions to comply with the new ESRB rules.

== Ratings ==
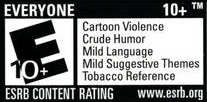
A typical ESRB rating label, listing the rating and specific content descriptors for the Wii version of Rabbids Go Home

ESRB ratings are primarily identified through icons, which are displayed on the packaging and promotional materials for a game. Each icon contains a stylized alphabetical letter representing the rating. A full label, containing both "content descriptors" and rating, are typically displayed on the back of a game's packaging.

Games that provide post-release downloadable content must ensure that the new content remains consistent with the original ESRB rating; otherwise the ESRB requires that the original game be re-evaluated and remarked with the more appropriate rating in considering this new content.

The original design of the ESRB rating icons used from 1994 to late 1999

The appearance of the ratings icons themselves have been updated several times; originally carrying a stylized, pixelated look, they were first updated in late 1999 to carry a cleaner appearance. In August 2013, the rating icons were streamlined again; the textual name of the rating became black text on white, the "content rated by" tagline was removed, and registered trademark symbols were moved to the bottom-right corner. The changes were intended to increase the icons' clarity at smaller sizes (such as on mobile devices), reflecting the growth in the digital distribution of video games.

| Icon | Rating | Years active | Description |
|---|---|---|---|
| | Rating Pending (RP) | 1994–present | This symbol is used in promotional materials for games which have not yet been assigned a final rating by the ESRB. |
| | Rating Pending – Likely Mature 17+ (RP) | 2021–present | This symbol is used in promotional materials for games which have not yet been assigned a final rating by the ESRB, but are anticipated to carry a "Mature" rating based on their content. |
| | Everyone (E) | 1994–1998 (as K-A); 1998–present (as E) | Games with this rating contain content that the ESRB believes is suitable for all ages, including minimal cartoon, fantasy, or mild violence, and infrequent use of profane language. This rating was initially known as Kids to Adults (K-A) until 1998, due to trademark issues preventing the use of an "E" icon. Prior to November 2012, the ESRB had a suggested recommendation of ages 6 and above for the E rating. |
| | Everyone 10+ (E10+) | 2005–present | Games with this rating contain content that the ESRB believes is suitable for ages 10 and over, including a larger amount of cartoon, fantasy, or mild violence than the "E" rating can accommodate, mild use of profane language, and minimal suggestive themes. |
| | Teen (T) | 1994–present | Games with this rating contain content that the ESRB believes is suitable for ages 13 and over, including aggressive depictions of violence with minimal blood, moderate suggestive themes, crude humor, and stronger use of profane language. |
| | Mature 17+ (M) | 1994–present | Games with this rating contain content that the ESRB believes is suitable for ages 17 and over, including intense and/or realistic depictions of violence, blood and gore, sexual content, and frequent use of profane and vulgar language. Requires age verification and parental accompaniment verification for purchase. |
| | Adults Only 18+ (AO) | 1994–present | See also: List of AO-rated video games Games with this rating contain content that the ESRB believes is suitable for ages 18 and over only; the majority of AO-rated titles are adult video games with graphic or explicit sexual content. There have been isolated cases of games receiving the rating for other reasons, including extreme violence, or allowing players to gamble using real money. The latter also includes games that utilize blockchain technology to distribute virtual goods with real-world value. |

=== Retired ratings ===
| Icon | Rating | Years active | Description |
|---|---|---|---|
| | Early Childhood (EC) | 1994–2018 | This rating denoted content which is aimed towards a preschool audience. Games with the rating do not contain content that parents would find objectionable to this audience. The EC rating was retired in 2018 due to underuse; such content today would receive an E rating. |

=== Content descriptors ===
In addition to the main age-based ratings, ESRB ratings also incorporate one or more of 32 "content descriptors", which provide detailed information about the specific types and levels of objectionable content contained in a game, including categories covering different levels of violence, language, sexual content, nudity, use of alcoholic beverages, tobacco products and drugs, crude and mature humor, or gambling. When a descriptor is preceded by the term "Mild", it is intended to convey low frequency (unless the definition of the content descriptor says otherwise), intensity, or severity.

| Name | Description |
|---|---|
| Alcohol Reference | References to alcohol in any form. |
| Animated Blood | Content includes unrealistic and/or discolored blood. |
| Blood | Graphics include realistic blood. |
| Blood and Gore | Graphics include realistic blood and the mutilation of body parts. |
| Cartoon Violence | Violent actions that look cartoon-like in nature. |
| Comic Mischief | Content includes slapstick or suggestive humor. |
| Crude Humor | Content includes humor that may seem vulgar. |
| Diverse Content: Discretion Advised | Contains content with varying levels of maturity. |
| Drug Reference | References to illegal drugs in any form. |
| Fantasy Violence | Violent actions that look unrealistic and can easily be distinguished from reality. |
| Gambling Themes | Prominently features images or activities that are typically associated with real-world gambling, even if they are not directly simulating a gambling experience. |
| Intense Violence | Graphic and realistic depictions of violence. May include weapons, human injury, blood, gore and/or death. |
| Language | Mild to moderate use of profanity. |
| Lyrics | Mildly objectionable lyrics contained in the game's soundtrack contain use of profanities, and/or references to sexuality, alcohol, tobacco, and/or drug use. |
| Mature Humor | Content includes "adult" humor. |
| Nudity | Depictions of nudity. |
| Partial Nudity | Brief and/or mild depictions of nudity. |
| Real Gambling | Player can gamble with real-life currency. |
| Sexual Content | Depictions of sexual behavior. |
| Sexual Themes | References to sex and/or sexuality. |
| Sexual Violence | Includes violent, sexual acts including rape. |
| Simulated Gambling | Contains gameplay that simulates gambling activities without using real-life currency. |
| Strong Language | Explicit/frequent use of profanity. |
| Strong Lyrics | Lyrics contained in the game's soundtrack contain explicit/frequent use of profanities and/or references to sexuality. |
| Strong Sexual Content | Explicit and/or frequent sexual behavior. |
| Suggestive Themes | Mild references to sex and/or sexuality. |
| Tobacco Reference | References to tobacco products in any form. |
| Use of Drugs | Depictions of the use of real illegal drugs. |
| Use of Alcohol | Depictions of alcohol consumption. |
| Use of Tobacco | Depictions of the use of tobacco products. |
| Violent References | References to violent acts. |
| Violence | Content includes aggressive behavior against an individual, community, self, or other real or fictional animals. |

=== Interactive elements ===
An ESRB ratings label may also include a third section related to "Interactive Elements", which disclaims if a game offers online communications, collects personal data, or offers digital goods or other premiums (including downloadable content and microtransactions) that require payment of real money to obtain. As of March 2026, after PEGI announced plans to specifically require games with certain types of interactive elements to be rated into existing categories, the ESRB states they have no plans to do that, staying with these labels, with a spokesperson saying "ESRB's research indicates that parents want upfront notice about features like online communications and the ability to spend real money on in-game purchases, but that it could be confusing if non-content related features influence rating category assignments."

| Icon | Name | Description |
|---|---|---|
| | In-Game Purchases | Game contains means to purchase in-game items with real-world money. |
| | In-Game Purchases (Includes Random Items) | Game contains in-game offers to purchase digital goods or premiums with real world currency (including virtual currency purchasable with real-world currency) for which the player does not know prior to purchase the specific digital goods or premiums they will be receiving, including loot boxes, item packs, and mystery awards. |
| | Shares Info | Personal information such as email address, phone number or credit card is provided to third parties. |
| | Shares Location | Can display the player's location with other players. |
| | Unrestricted Internet | Product provides access to the internet. |
| | Users Interact | Players can get in direct communication with others through social media and networks. |
| | Online Music Not Rated by the ESRB | Warns that songs that are streamed or downloaded as add-ons for music-based games have not been rated and that their content has not been considered in the ESRB rating assignment. |

== Enforcement ==
The ESRB rating system is primarily enforced on a self-regulatory basis by the video game and retail industries; in markets where it is used, retailers typically enforce the "Mature" rating using photo identification, and refuse to stock video games that have not been rated by the organization, or are rated "Adults Only". Modern video game consoles include parental controls that can be configured to restrict games played by specific users, using factors such as their ESRB rating. The ESRB has also taken action against video game distributors who use the ratings icons in advertising without authorization or having actually been issued the rating by the board. For example, in 2013, the ESRB told the publisher of Wartune to cease using the board's "Adults Only" icon in advertising material, as the ESRB had not actually rated the game, and ESRB guidelines do not allow ads to "glamorize or exploit" the game's ESRB rating.

Steam, the largest digital distribution storefront for personal computers, does display ratings when available, and allows games to be categorized and filtered based on categories and the extent of potentially objectionable content, but an ESRB rating is not mandatory. As of June 2018, following complaints regarding inconsistent enforcement of its previous guidelines, Steam stated that it would only ban the sale of games that contain blatantly illegal content, or games that it classifies as being "straight up trolling". However, in March 2019, it was revealed that there are still undisclosed limitations to this policy based on "costs and risks" associated with Steam's ability to distribute specific games, and in July 2025, in compliance with demands from Australian advocacy group Collective Shout, Steam expressly prohibited games that "may violate the rules and standards" of its payment processors, including "certain types of adult content". Epic Games Store prohibits "Adults Only"-rated games, unless the rating was solely for their use of blockchain technology.

In the United States, there have been attempts at the state and federal level to introduce laws requiring retailers to enforce the ESRB ratings system. In 2004, California Assemblyman Leland Yee sponsored a state bill requiring retailers to stock M-rated games on separate shelves that are at least 5 feet (60 in) from the ground. The bill was passed, after it was modified to only require that retailers promote awareness of the ESRB ratings system to their customers.

The following year, California passed AB 1179, a second bill sponsored by Yee, which banned the sale of "violent video games" to minors. The term was defined using a variation of the Miller test (originally created to judge whether a work is obscene), separate from any rating the game may have received. In a landmark ruling, the law was struck down by the Supreme Court in Brown v. Entertainment Merchants Association, which ruled that AB 1179 was unconstitutional because video games are a protected form of expression.

In Canada, ESRB ratings are enforced under provincial laws by film ratings boards in Manitoba, New Brunswick, Nova Scotia, and Saskatchewan, and by the Ministry of Public and Business Service Delivery and Procurement in Ontario. As in the U.S., retailers voluntarily enforce the ratings regardless. Prior to the implementation of the Film Classification Act, 2005, which gave it the power to enforce ESRB ratings, the Ontario Film Review Board had used its own powers to classify the M-rated Manhunt as a film and give it a "Restricted" rating to ban its sale to those under 18. By contrast, the British Columbia Film Classification Office considered the ESRB rating to be appropriate.

== Marketing ==
Example of an ESRB cross-promotion. In this case, this is marketing games that are rated E, E10+, T, and M.

The ESRB enforces guidelines that have been adopted by the video game industry in order to ensure responsible advertising and marketing practices. These include ensuring that game packaging and promotional materials (including advertisements and trailers) properly display rating information, restricting where promotional materials for games rated "Teen" or higher can appear, prohibiting publishers from glamorizing or exploiting a game's rating in marketing materials, and requiring online marketing of games rated "Mature" or higher to be restricted to users who are appropriately aged. This allows the ESRB to restrict video game advertising "to consumers for whom the product is not rated as appropriate." The board also forbids ratings from other organizations from being shown alongside ESRB ratings on publishers' websites or social media outlets.

A group of online gaming publications known as the ESRB Website Council operates under a similar code of conduct, which requires them to display ESRB ratings information for games that they cover, and implement systems to restrict access to audiovisual content depicting M or AO-rated games to users who are appropriately aged.

In March 2013, the ESRB eased certain restrictions on the promotion of M-rated games. Firstly, trailers for games that are or are anticipated to be rated "Mature" can be cleared by the ESRB as being appropriate for "general" audiences—similarly to the "green band" ratings issued by the MPAA for film trailers. Secondly, the board began to allow, on a case-by-case basis depending on the target demographic of the game, M-rated games to be cross-promoted in the marketing materials of games with lower ratings.

== Online privacy ==
In addition to its video game ratings operation, the ESRB also offers an online privacy program which helps websites adopt privacy policies and data usage practices which comply with relevant laws and best practices for the collection and use of personal information, and provides "Privacy Certified" seals indicating certification under the ESRB's privacy guidelines. In June 2013, the service was extended to mobile apps, with a particular emphasis on helping application developers comply with the then-upcoming changes to the Children's Online Privacy Protection Act.

== Reception ==
The ESRB has considered its system to be effective, due in part to initiatives by the Board to promote enforcement and consumer awareness of the system, and efforts by retailers to prevent the sale of M-rated games to minors.

In the year following its 1994 launch, the ESRB rating system had achieved widespread usage across the console game industry, although adoption was not yet as high within the PC gaming industry. Lieberman and Kohl also reported that some retailers were reluctant to the idea of removing older, non-rated games from their shelves, and that some retail employees lacked knowledge of the new system. By 2008, the Federal Trade Commission reported 20% of underaged mystery shoppers were able to successfully purchase an M-rated video game from a selection of retailers—a 22 percent reduction from 2007. By 2011, these numbers had dropped further to 13%. In its 2009 Report to Congress, the FTC recognized the ESRB for having "the strongest self-regulatory code" of all entertainment sectors because of its enforcement of advertising and marketing guidelines.

=== Ratings accuracy ===
The ESRB has often been accused of not rating certain games, such as Manhunt and the Grand Theft Auto series, harshly enough for violence and other related themes, and for lacking transparency in certain aspects of the ratings process. Critics have argued that some games only received the M rating rather than the stricter AO rating because of the commercial effects of such a rating; console manufacturers and most retailers refuse to distribute AO-rated games, dramatically affecting their commercial availability. An ESRB representative stated that the Board uses the AO rating when warranted, even due to violence, and that in most occasions, publishers would edit the game to meet the M rating to ensure wide commercial availability instead of keeping the AO rating. The film classification boards of the Canadian provinces of British Columbia and Ontario respectively classified the M-rated games Soldier of Fortune and Manhunt as films due to concerns over the nature of their content, and gave them "Restricted" ratings, legally restricting their sale to adults.

There has been a correlation between the M rating and sales; a 2007 study by Electronic Entertainment Design and Research found that M-rated games "have both the highest average Metacritic scores and the highest average gross sales in the United States", and NPD Group found that 7 of the top 20 video games of 2010 (including the #1 game, Call of Duty: Black Ops) were M-rated, even though only 5% of games released that year carried the rating.

In 2005, the National Institute on Media and the Family (NIMF) criticized the ESRB for seldom-using the Adults Only rating, arguing that because it has a vested interest in the video game industry, it did not want to perform actions that would affect their commercial availability. The organization stated that "study after study shows that ratings would be stricter if parents were doing the job. It took explicit porn to get Grand Theft Auto: San Andreas an AO rating, even though the original version, still rated M, rewards players whose on-screen persona had sex with prostitutes and then killed them. We have been calling for AO ratings for the Grand Theft Auto series for years—now it is clear why the ESRB has ignored our request." The ESRB disputed these claims, arguing that the organization "relies on flawed research and ignores any and all conflicting evidence", was "imposing its own narrow values and morality on the rest of the country, regardless that it has little evidence to show that parents agree with their point of view", and did not reply to the ESRB's request for comments following its report card in 2004. The board also pointed out that the NIMF's study and "report card" used data from PSVRatings, a for-profit competitor to the ESRB.

On the other hand, some have felt that the "Mature" rating is too broad; video game journalist Ben Kuchera noted that Halo 3—a sci-fi first-person shooter whose level of violence was, in his opinion, comparable to a Star Wars film, had received an M rating for "Blood and Gore," "Mild Language" and "Violence". He argued that "having a game like Halo 3 share the same rating as Saints Row IV, which carries the 'Blood,' Intense Violence,' 'Partial Nudity,' 'Sexual Content,' 'Strong Language' and 'Use of Drugs' descriptors was always silly, and it weakened the thrust of the ratings system." Likewise, he felt that the tone and content of the PG-13 rated film The Dark Knight was relatively harsher to children than that of the Saints Row series due to the latter's comedic tone, but still noted that "as parents we know what's right and what isn't for our kids, and being aware of the content they consume is a large part of our job as parents." Halo 5: Guardians received a "Teen" rating instead of "Mature". Microsoft Xbox division executive Aaron Greenberg argued that consumers had been "surprised" by the M rating on previous installments "given the style of the game and the lack of real graphic violence and things like that", but that the "Teen" rating would theoretically enable the game to reach a broader audience of younger players.

=== Adults Only rating ===
The "Adults Only" (AO) rating has attracted a negative stigma among the video game industry—one which has been criticized for stifling the ability for developers to have creative freedom in their portrayal of certain themes in a game, at the risk of being commercially unviable due to publishers' objections to AO-rated content. AO-rated games cannot be published for major video game console platforms, and most retailers do not stock AO-rated games. ESRB President Patricia Vance argued that applying self-censorship to ensure marketability was a compromise that is "true in every entertainment medium", but still believed that the idea of the AO rating eventually becoming acceptable would be a good thing for the ESRB system. The stigma is primarily affected by a perception by the industry and other activists that video games are generally considered children's products; for example, the availability of a Wii version of Manhunt 2 was condemned by Senator Hillary Clinton over fears that children could use the game's motion controls to act out the game's "many graphic torture scenes and murders".

Attitudes towards AO-rated games have also been influenced by the types of games that have received the rating; Peter Payne, head of Peach Princess, a publisher of English translations of Japanese eroge visual novels, believed that the "Adults Only" rating had acquired a "smutty" and "tasteless" reputation since the majority of AO-rated titles were either niche pornographic titles such as eroge games, or immature titles such as Riana Rouge (which Polygon described as a game which had the quality of an adult movie, and "[aimed] to do nothing more than tell low-brow jokes and show nude women prancing around") and Lula 3D (whose packaging advertised the inclusion of "Bouncin' Boobs Technology").

By contrast, the ESRB has only officially issued the AO rating for extreme violence three times: Thrill Kill, a fighting game with heavy sexual overtones, received an AO rating with content descriptors for "Animated Violence" and "Animated Blood and Gore". Due to objections over the game's content, Thrill Kill was canceled by Electronic Arts after it acquired the North American operations of the game's publisher, Virgin Interactive Entertainment. Manhunt 2 also received an AO rating for its extreme violence; while the uncut version would be released exclusively for PCs, the console versions were edited to meet the M rating criteria. In January 2015, Hatred, a controversial game whose plot centers around a character indiscriminately murdering everyone he encounters, received the rating for its extreme violence and harsh language; one of the game's developers disputed the rating, arguing that "its violence isn't really that bad and this harsh language isn't overused", but also acknowledged the rarity of their situation.

=== Hidden content ===
The 2005 game Grand Theft Auto: San Andreas was originally intended to include a broader amount of sexually explicit content, but Rockstar North elected to leave the content out of the final game due to concerns over its eventual ESRB rating. Due to time constraints, Rockstar could not remove this content from the game's source code entirely, and instead made it inaccessible via normal gameplay; soon after the release of San Andreas, a modification for the PC version known as "Hot Coffee" allowed access to an incomplete sex minigame that was present in the code of the released game.

The discovery of the minigame caused California State Assemblyman Leland Yee to rebuke both Rockstar and the ESRB, arguing that the ESRB was not doing its job properly. US Senators Hillary Clinton and Joe Lieberman also expressed their disapproval. Rockstar initially claimed that the minigame was created by the mod community and was not a part of the original game. This was disproven when it was discovered that a third-party cheat device could be used to unlock the scenes in console versions of the game. Following an investigation, the ESRB changed its rating from M to AO, setting a precedent that games can be re-rated due to the presence of pertinent content that exists on the game's disc, even if that content is programmed to not be playable without modification or unauthorized use of a third-party cheat device. Following the release of a version excluding the content, the rating was reverted to M.

In May 2006, The Elder Scrolls IV: Oblivion had its rating changed from T to M due to "more detailed depictions of blood and gore than were considered in the original rating", along with a third-party mod for the PC version allowing the use of topless female characters. The game's co-publisher, Bethesda Softworks, decided not to re-edit the game or contest the new rating, but noted that Oblivion's content was "not typical" of games with the M rating, and that the game "does not present the central themes of violence that are common to those products."

In the wake of these two incidents, the ESRB changed its policies in June 2006 to account for hidden content; publishers must disclose information surrounding all unlockable or otherwise "hidden" content in the game as part of the ratings process, and publishers can be fined up to US$1 million if they are found to have misrepresented the content of their game after further reviews. In response to the aftermath of Hot Coffee and the resulting policy changes, ESRB President Patricia Vance stated that in her opinion, "there is no other industry self-regulatory system willing or capable of imposing such swift and sweeping sanctions on its own members, which in this particular case resulted in the removal of a top-selling product from the market and a major loss of sales." However, several U.S. politicians, including Senator Sam Brownback, California State Senator Leland Yee, and Michigan Congressman Fred Upton (who was a major critic against Rockstar during the controversy), still felt that the ESRB had "lost" its trust of consumers, believing that video game developers were taking advantage of the board's conflict of interest with the industry to incorporate objectionable content into their products without the ESRB's full knowledge.

In late 2006, both Upton and Brownback tabled bills to place governmental oversight on aspects of the ESRB rating process, and make it illegal for publishers to misrepresent the playable content of a video game to a ratings board; Upton proposed a bill known as the Video Game Decency Act, explaining that developers had "done an end-run around the process to deliver violent and pornographic material to our kids", and that the bill would "[go] hand in hand with the mission of the industry's own ratings system." Brownback proposed a bill known as the Truth in Video Game Rating Act, which would have also forced the ESRB to have full, hands-on access to games instead of just video footage, and have initiated a government study on the "effectiveness" of the organization and the possibility of forming a ratings organization independent from the video game industry.

=== Microtransactions ===
In October 2017, in response to growing criticism of the loot box model for video game microtransactions (which grant chances at earning randomized items of various rarities, typically cosmetic in nature, in exchange for payment), the ESRB stated their opinion that they were not a form of gambling. They described them as a voluntary and optional aspect of a video game, and comparable to booster packs for collectible card games because their purchase guarantees that a user will receive items, but not necessarily high-value items all the time. The ESRB added that games that contain actual wagering of real money would hold the Adults Only rating.

On February 14, 2018, U.S. senator Maggie Hassan asked the ESRB to examine if games with loot box microtransactions were being marketed in an "ethical and transparent way" that "adequately protects the developing minds of young children from predatory practices." The ESRB subsequently announced on February 27, 2018, that it would introduce a new label for any games that contain "the ability to purchase digital goods or premiums with real world currency". The announcement was criticized for being overreaching and ambiguous, as it applies to not only microtransactions, but any purchases of digital goods in relation to a game (which includes downloadable content), and would thus apply to almost all modern video games. Patrica Vance stated that the ESRB avoided references to specific types of microtransactions, so that the advisory label could be understood by parents unaware of specific details. Vance added that the ESRB was "unable to find any evidence that children specifically have been [psychologically] impacted by loot boxes" or that they caused children to develop "some sort of tendency towards gambling." The new label "in-game purchases" was added to ESRB's standards by April 2018.

On April 13, 2020, the ESRB announced on their official blog that they are introducing a new interactive elements: "in-game purchases (includes random items)". This notice will specifically apply to "all games that include purchases with any randomized elements", which includes, but is not limited to, loot boxes, gacha games, item or card packs, prize wheels, and treasure chests. The original label will still apply for "other type purchases", such as additional levels, cosmetics, DLC, expansions, and other downloadable contents.

== Usage ==
The ESRB is officially recognized, implemented and used in Canada, Mexico and the United States.

| Entity | Status of ESRB |
|---|---|
| Canada | The ESRB ratings system is recognized by law in several Canadian provinces, primarily by restricting the sale of "Mature" and "Adults Only"-rated games to those who are not appropriately aged. |
| Mexico | Implemented and recognized. Used alongside "Lineamientos Generales del Sistema Mexicano de Equivalencias de Clasificación de Contenidos de Videojuegos" since May 2021. |
| United States | A series of Senate hearings from 1992 to 1994 led to the creation of the ESRB. Officially implemented and recognized, technically voluntary compliance. |

== See also ==
- Censorship in Canada
- Censorship in Mexico
- Censorship in the United States
- Video game controversies
- Video game rating system
