= Brown v. Entertainment Merchants Association =

- Supreme Court of the United States

Argued November 2, 2010 Decided June 27, 2011
- Full case name: Edmund G. Brown, Governor of the State of California, and Kamala Harris, Attorney General of the State of California v. Entertainment Merchants Association and Entertainment Software Association
- Docket no.: 08-1448
- Citations: 564 U.S. 786 (more) 131 S. Ct. 2729; 180 L. Ed. 2d 708

Case history
- Prior: Preliminary injunction granted to plaintiffs, sub nom. Video Software Dealers Assn. v. Schwarzenegger, 401 F. Supp. 2d 1034 (N.D. Cal. 2005); summary judgment granted to plaintiffs, No. C-05-04188, 2007 WL 2261546 (N.D. Cal. Aug. 6, 2007); aff'd, 556 F.3d 950 (9th Cir. 2009); cert. granted, 559 U.S. 1092 (2010).

Questions presented
- Does the First Amendment bar a state from restricting the sale of violent video games to minors?

Holding
- Bans on the sale of violent video games to children without parental supervision violate the Free Speech Clause of the First Amendment.

Court membership
- Chief Justice John Roberts Associate Justices Antonin Scalia · Anthony Kennedy; Clarence Thomas · Ruth Bader Ginsburg; Stephen Breyer · Samuel Alito; Sonia Sotomayor · Elena Kagan

Case opinions
- Majority: Scalia, joined by Kennedy, Ginsburg, Sotomayor, Kagan
- Concurrence: Alito (in judgment), joined by Roberts
- Dissent: Thomas
- Dissent: Breyer

Laws applied
- U.S. Const. amend. I; Cal. Civ. Code §§ 1746–1746.5 (2009)

Brown v. Entertainment Merchants Association, 564 U.S. 786 (2011), is a landmark decision of the US Supreme Court that struck down a 2005 California law banning the sale of certain violent video games to children without parental supervision. In a 7–2 decision, the Court affirmed the lower court decisions and nullified the law, ruling that video games were protected speech under the First Amendment as other forms of media.

The ruling was seen as a significant victory for the video game industry. Several of the Court's justices suggested that the issue might need to be re-examined in the future, considering the changing nature of video games and their continuously developing technology.

== Background ==
Many video games, as early as 1976's Death Race, incorporate some aspect of violence into the gameplay mechanic, such as killing an enemy with a weapon, using explosives to destroy a structure, or engaging in dangerous vehicle races. With modern technology, representations of such violence have become more realistic. This has led to concerns that minors who play such video games will be influenced by the violence, altering their real-life behavior. Academic studies have attempted to find a connection between violent video games and the rate of violence and crimes from those that play them; some have stated a connection exists, while others find no link between the matters. Incidents such as the Columbine High School massacre in 1999 have heightened concerns of a potential connection between video games and violent actions. Accordingly, many concerned groups including politicians and parents have sought to enact regulatory controls of video games to prevent their sales to youth. Prior and during the Brown v. EMA case, parties like the Entertainment Software Association (ESA) sought to overturn similar state laws that placed limits on the sales of violent video games to minors in Michigan and Illinois. The ESA won these cases, with the laws being found unconstitutional and overly restrictive of protected speech. These states did not further challenge the court rulings. The ESA similarly defeated a Louisiana bill in the 2006 Entertainment Software Association v. Foti case that would have attempted to ban sales of violent video games to minors.

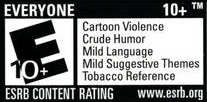
A typical ESRB rating label will identify the appropriate age group and specific content descriptors for each rated game.

To counteract these increasing complaints and attempts at legislation, the video game industry in the United States created the Entertainment Software Rating Board (ESRB) in 1994. This was prompted by a 1993 congressional hearing over the violence in the video game Mortal Kombat and lack of consistent content ratings between publishers, with Congress threatening to pass legislation that would mandate a ratings system if the industry did not take its own steps. The industry reacted by forming the Interactive Digital Software Association, which would become the ESA, and establishing the ESRB. The ESRB, like the Motion Picture Association of America's rating system, is a voluntary and self-regulated body that examines the content of video games as provided by the publisher before distribution, and given a rating describing the content within, generally classified from being all ages-appropriate to adult audiences only. Video game distributors are similarly bound by voluntary compliance to check the age of the purchaser against the rating of the game to prevent the sale of mature titles to younger players. Most stores prevent the sale of unrated games, so virtually every video game sold at retail in the United States is rated by the ESRB.

Attempts have been made to mandate the ratings system; the Family Entertainment Protection Act, a 2005 bill introduced into the U.S. Congress by Senators Hillary Clinton, Joseph Lieberman, and Evan Bayh, would have made ESRB participation mandatory with oversight by the Federal Trade Commission, and introduced fines for selling Mature or Adult-Only content to minors. The bill, however, did not clear the Senate. Though the ESRB met criticism in 2000–2005 for the ease of access of mature-rated games to minors, the Board has improved its efforts to enforce the ratings system at retailers. A 2011 report issued by the Federal Trade Commission found that the voluntary controls by the ESRB had the highest success rate of any media industry, preventing sales of mature titles to minors 87% of the time. Similar content rating systems exist in other countries, including Europe's Pan European Game Information (PEGI) system, the Australian Classification Board, and Japan's Computer Entertainment Rating Organization.

=== California law ===
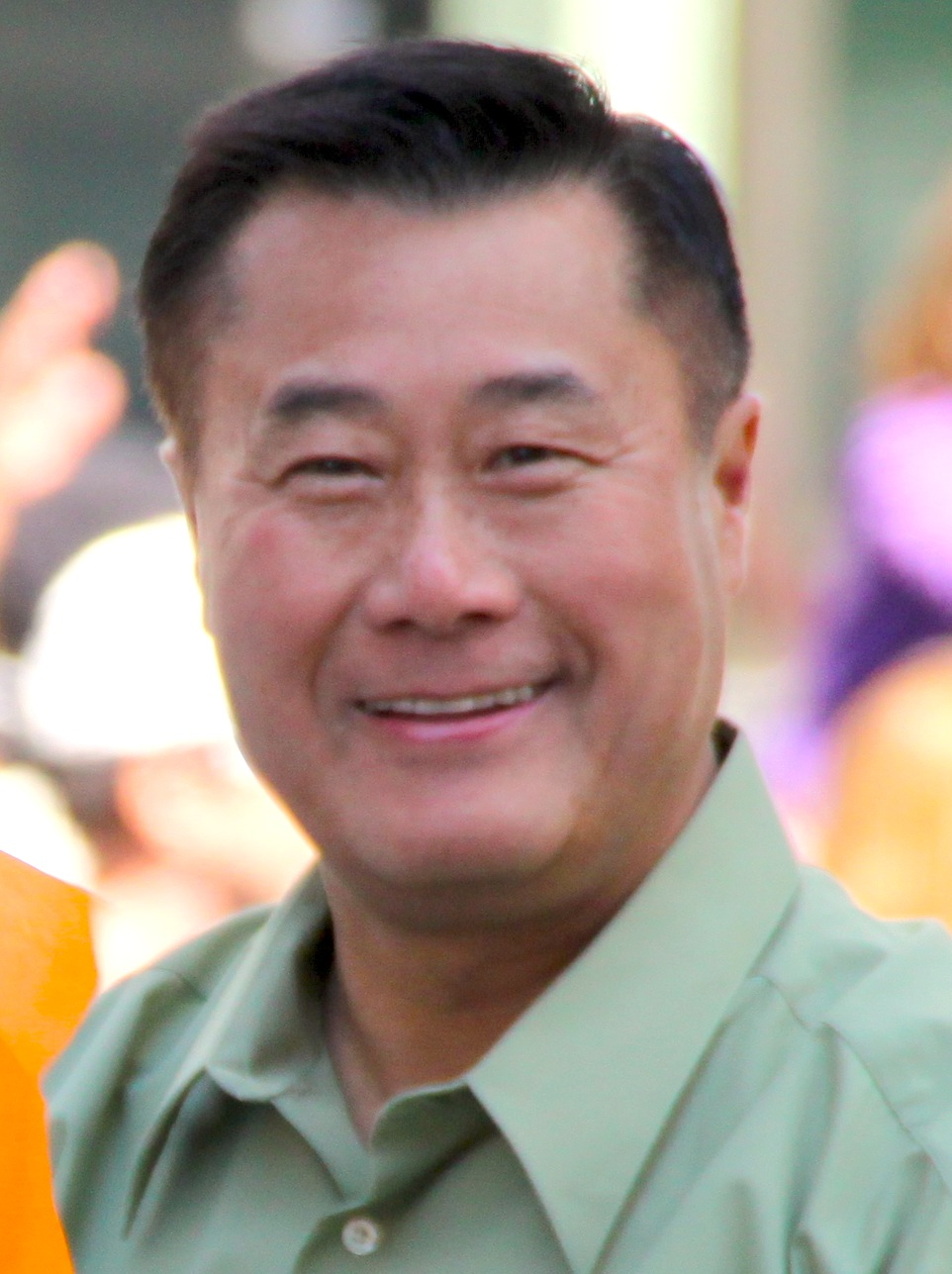
California state senator Leland Yee introduced CA Law AB 1179, the law debated in the case.

In 2005, the California State Legislature passed AB 1179, sponsored by then-California State Senator Leland Yee, which banned the sale of violent video games to anyone under age 18 and required clear labeling beyond the existing ESRB rating system. The law would have a maximum $1000 fine for each infraction. The definition of "violent video game" used a variation of the Miller test, a three-pronged test used previously by the United States Supreme Court to define when obscene speech is not protected under the First Amendment. The bill was signed into law by Governor Arnold Schwarzenegger in October 2005. The law would have gone into effect in January 2006.

The law was a second attempt by Yee to enact restrictions for video game sales to minors. Yee's background as a child psychologist led him to assert there was a connection between video games and violence and believed that the government had strong interest in restricting video game sales to minors as was already done for pornographic works. In 2004, Yee had drafted a law that would have required mature-rated video games to be stocked separately from other titles. Though the bill ultimately passed as CA Law AB 1793, the bill's language was diluted at its passage, only requiring stores to display the ESRB ratings system and provide information to parents about it.

== Legal challenges ==
=== The District Court opinion ===
Before the California bill was signed into law, the ESA and the Video Software Dealers Association (VSDA), now known as the Entertainment Merchants Association (EMA), were preparing a lawsuit to overturn the law, fearing that the "violent video game" definition would affect many titles that the ESRB has otherwise labeled appropriate for younger players, and threaten to harm the video game industry. The VSDA filed suit in the United States District Court for the Northern District of California and was later joined by the ESA. The two groups succeeded in obtaining a preliminary injunction in December 2005 to block enforcement of the law during the case; U.S. District Judge Ronald M. Whyte cited in his preliminary decision: "The plaintiffs have shown at least that serious questions are raised concerning the States' ability to restrict minors' First Amendment rights in connection with exposure to violent video games, including the question of whether there is a causal connection between access to such games and psychological or other harm to children." In August 2007, Whyte ultimately ruled for the plaintiffs, holding that the law violated the First Amendment, and that there was an insufficient showing of proof that either video games differed from other media or that there was established causality between violent video games and violent behavior.

=== The Ninth Circuit appeal ===
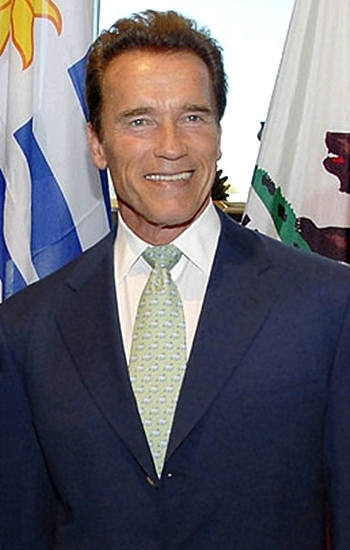
Governor Arnold Schwarzenegger led the appeal of the lower courts' decisions.

California Governor Arnold Schwarzenegger appealed the ruling in September 2007, stating that he would "vigorously defend this law" and that he and the people of California have "a responsibility to our kids and our communities to protect against the effects of games that depict ultra-violent actions". The Ninth Circuit Court of Appeals affirmed Whyte's decision in 2009.

The Ninth Circuit considered the constitutionality of the law; given the timeframe of the law's passing relative to litigation, it was referred to as the "Act" in the court's opinion. The Ninth Circuit affirmed the District Court's Summary Judgment for the VSDA by holding:

1. The Act is a presumptively invalid content-based restriction on speech, so it is subject to strict scrutiny and not the "variable obscenity" standard from Ginsberg v. New York.
2. The Act violates rights protected by the First Amendment because the state has not demonstrated a compelling interest, has not tailored the restriction to its alleged compelling interest, and there exists a less-restrictive means that would further the State's expressed interest.
3. The Act's labeling requirement is unconstitutionally compelled speech under the First Amendment because it does not require the disclosure of purely factual information, but compels the carrying of the State's controversial opinion.

The court first addressed the VSDA's argument that the entire Act should be invalidated based on the defendant's concession on appeal that the definition of "violent video game" in the Act is unconstitutionally broad. However, the statute had a severability clause, so the court went through the severability test set forth in Hotel Employees & Rest. Employees Int'l Union v. Davis. The court held that the definition for "violent video game" is grammatically and functionally separable because, as an alternative definition of "violent video game", it can be removed from the Act without affecting the wording or function of the Act's other provisions. Further, the definitions are volitionally separable because those sections were not of critical importance to the passage of the Act and the legislative body would have adopted the Act had it foreseen the partial invalidation of the statute. These definition sections were only included to avoid the possibility that a court would rule the terms unconstitutionally vague; the court found that the legislature would still have enacted the statute without this definition section.

The court next went on to determine what level of scrutiny should be applied in reviewing the Act's prohibitions. The defendants insisted that the "variable obscenity" standard from Ginsberg v. New York should be used. However, the court held that the "variable obscenity" standard does not apply to violence. The Court in Ginsberg was careful to place substantive limits on its holding, and concern in Ginsberg regarded only "sex material", not violence. The court declined to extend the application of the "variable obscenity" standard to violence, so strict scrutiny was applied instead.

In applying the strict scrutiny standard, the court recognized that "content-based regulations are presumptively invalid", and to survive invalidation, the Act had to fulfill two qualifications:

1. Restrictions "must be narrowly tailored to promote a compelling Government interest".
2. "If a less restrictive alternative would serve the Government's purpose, the legislature must use that alternative."

The court invalidated the statute on both accounts. First, the court said that in considering its decision, the court limited the purpose of the Act to the actual harm to the brain of a child playing a violent video game. As a result, the state was required to show that "the recited harms are real, not merely conjectural, and that the regulation will in fact alleviate these harms in a direct and material way". Here, the defendants failed to do so because all of the reports they relied on in making these claims were admittedly flawed. While the state is allowed to protect minors from actual psychological or neurological harm, it is not permitted to control minors' thoughts. Second, the court held that the defendants did not demonstrate the absence of less restrictive alternative means. In fact, video games already comply with a voluntary rating system that rates video games based on their topics and age appropriateness. This is a clear example of a less restrictive means. The court noted that the least restrictive means is not the same as the most effective means.

The court also evaluated the constitutionality of the Act's labeling provision, which requires that a label be affixed to the front of every package the state deems to be a "violent video game". Generally, "freedom of speech prohibits the government from telling people what they must say". However, the court has upheld compelled commercial speech where it is the inclusion of "purely factual and uncontroversial information" in advertising. However, the labeling requirement of "violent video game" is not factual information. The Act has not clearly and legally provided a way to determine if a video game is violent so the sticker does not convey factual information. Consequently, the court found that the Act is unconstitutional.

=== Supreme Court appeal ===
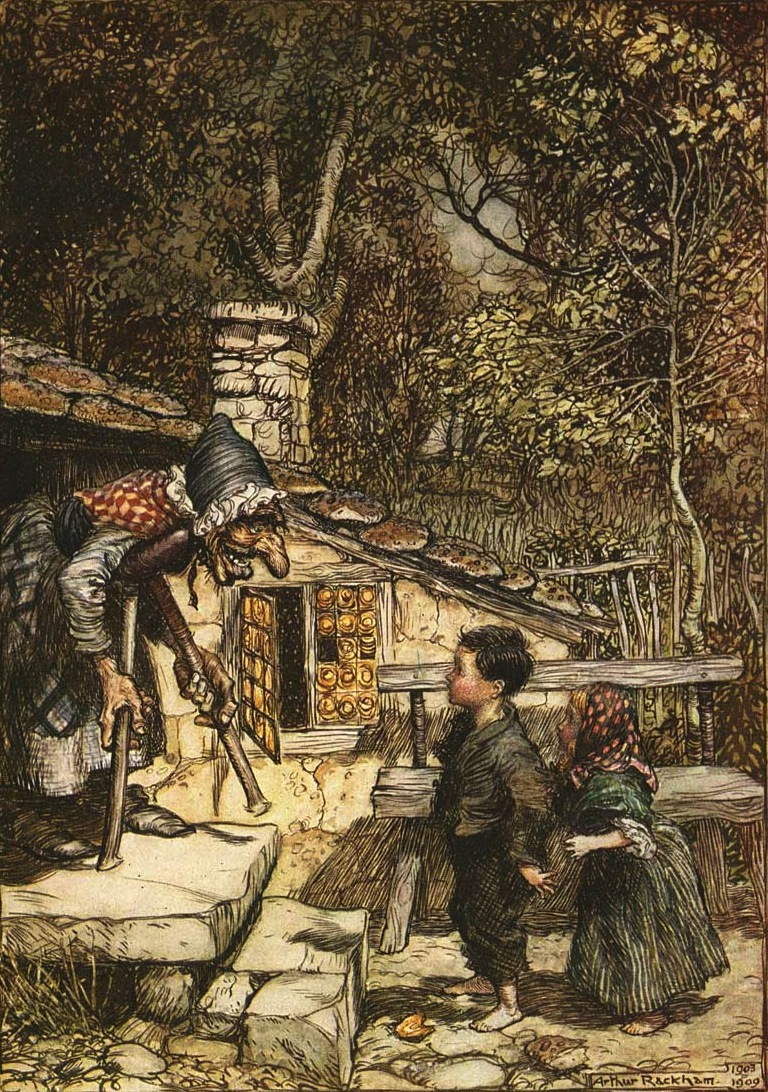
Justice Antonin Scalia, along with those supporting the ESA side of the case, questioned whether violent video games should be treated differently from other media with similar violence regularly exposed to minors, such as the fairy tale of Hansel and Gretel.

Schwarzenegger again appealed to the Supreme Court, looking to overturn the Ninth Circuit's ruling, filing a writ of certiorari to the Court in May 2009. The Supreme Court agreed to hear the case, at this point filed as Schwarzenegger v. Entertainment Merchants Ass'n. The fact that the Court accepted this case was considered surprising, based on the previous case record for such violent video game laws that were unanimously overturned in other states. Analysts believed that because the Court agreed to hear this case, there were unanswered questions between the protection of free speech from the First Amendment, and the legal enforcement of protecting minors from unprotected free speech such as through restrictions on the sales of pornography to minors. Just a week prior to the acceptance of the certiorari, in United States v. Stevens the Court overturned another law that sought restrictions on depictions of animal cruelty, which some analysts felt would reflect the Court's position to likely overturn the violent video game law.

The Entertainment Consumers Association (ECA) launched an online petition along with their amicus brief to provide the Supreme Court additional information. The Progress & Freedom Foundation and the Electronic Frontier Foundation together submitted an amicus brief citing social research that declared Super Mario Bros. to be a violent video game. It was compared to Mighty Mouse and Road Runner, cartoons that depict a similar form of violence with little negative reaction from the public. Video game developers Microsoft and Activision Blizzard supported the ESA effort. Industry associations for musical works, movies, and publishing, including the National Association of Broadcasters, the Motion Picture Association of America, Recording Industry Association of America, National Cable & Telecommunications Association, and the Future of Music Coalition, also submitted briefs to the court in favor of striking down the law, fearing that should the law be found constitutional, their industries would also be affected. Associations for the protection of civil rights, including the American Civil Liberties Union, the National Coalition Against Censorship, and the National Youth Rights Association, submitted amicus briefs. Also filing amicus briefs against the State of California was a coalition of other states including Rhode Island, Arkansas, Georgia, Nebraska, North Dakota, Oklahoma, South Carolina, Utah and Washington, as well as Puerto Rico, which stated the law was unnecessary as no evidence linked video games to youth violence and the voluntary ESRB system was working well. Also submitting an amicus brief opposing the law was a coalition of 82 psychologists, criminologists, medical scientists and media researchers concerned that the State of California had misrepresented the science on video games.

The State of California was joined by eleven other States, including those that had passed laws later declared unconstitutional; the States, in an amicus brief, stated that they are "vitally interested in protecting the welfare of children and in helping parents raise them" but the District Court's decision restricts their authority to do so. Further supporting the State of California were the American Academy of Pediatrics, the California Psychological Association, Common Sense Media, and the Eagle Forum.

Oral arguments were held on November 2, 2010. To California's attorney, the Justices voiced concern on the distinction between video games and other commercial works such as films and comic books. Justice Antonin Scalia wondered if the law with its vague definition of "violence" could also be applied to Grimms' Fairy Tales. To the ESA and other trade groups, the Justices suggested that California and other states do have precedence to protect minors from certain forms of violence, though under narrower terms than the California law. Justice John Roberts argued that while companies can provide parental filters on such violent games, "any 13-year-old can bypass [them] in about five minutes". Several questions centered on the controversial game Postal 2, where the player can urinate on non-player characters and set them ablaze, among other violent acts. The Justices, in general, agreed that upholding California's law would require a "novel extension of First Amendment principles to expressions concerning violence".

With Jerry Brown winning the 2010 California Governor election, the case was renamed to Brown v. Entertainment Merchants Ass'n after the oral hearings.

== Opinion ==
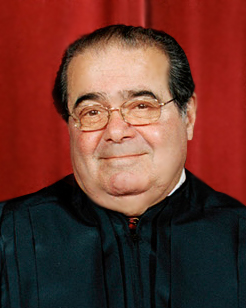
Justice Antonin Scalia wrote the majority opinion in the case.

On June 27, 2011, the Supreme Court issued a 7–2 judgment striking down the California law as unconstitutional on the basis of the First and Fourteenth Amendments. The majority opinion was authored by Justice Antonin Scalia and joined by Justices Kennedy, Ginsburg, Sotomayor, and Kagan. It first held that "video games qualify for First Amendment protection":

Like the protected books, plays, and movies that preceded them, video games communicate ideas—and even social messages—through many familiar literary devices (such as characters, dialogue, plot, and music) and through features distinctive to the medium (such as the player's interaction with the virtual world). That suffices to confer First Amendment protection.

Justice Scalia then affirmed that, while states may pass laws to block obscene material from minors as previously decided in the 1968 Ginsberg v. New York case, "speech about violence is not obscene", and California's statute was unlawful. The decision pointed to fairy tales like those of the Brothers Grimm, which are regularly given to children to read, "contain no shortage of gore" that are also present in video games. The decision further compared video games to classical works like The Divine Comedy, stating that "Even if we can see in them nothing of any possible value to society ..., they are as much entitled to the protection of free speech as the best of literature." Scalia's decision also stated that the current self-moderated industry standards like the ESRB are operated effectively to regulate the sale of more mature games to minors, and that "filling the remaining modest gap in concerned-parents' control can hardly be a compelling state interest" requiring a law to enforce. The Court's decision also determined that from the evidence, there was no "compelling" link between violent video games and its effects on children. The decision cited one medical report that asserted that cartoons like Looney Tunes generate the same effects in children as in games like Sonic the Hedgehog or imagery of guns.

=== Alito's concurrence ===
Justice Samuel Alito wrote an opinion concurring in the judgment, which was joined by Chief Justice John Roberts. Though Alito agreed that the California law violated the First Amendment, believing that its "threshold requirement" that guides what material would be covered by the law was too broad, he questioned the potential double standard that existed between violence and sexual content in regards to this threshold. Alito wrote that he was unsure that there was no connection between violent video games and effects on children, stating that "There are reasons to suspect that the experience of playing violent video games just might be very different from reading a book, listening to the radio, or watching a movie or a television show", referencing the book Infinite Reality which highlights the psychological effects of virtual reality, and argued that the decision "would not squelch legislative efforts to deal with what is perceived by some to be a significant and developing social problem".

=== Dissents ===
Justices Clarence Thomas and Stephen Breyer dissented, each writing a separate dissent. Justice Thomas, in his dissent, considered that historically, the Founding Fathers "believed parents to have complete authority over their minor children and expected parents to direct the development of those children", and that the intent of the First Amendment "does not include a right to speak to minors (or a right of minors to access speech) without going through the minors' parents or guardians".

Breyer wrote separately, concerned that the majority's decision conflicts with previous rulings from Ginsberg and Miller. He contrasted the previous findings regulating sales of publications containing nudity to those of violent video games: "But what sense does it make to forbid selling to a 13-year-old boy a magazine with an image of a nude woman, while protecting a sale to that 13 year-old of an interactive video game in which he actively, but virtually, binds and gags the woman, then tortures and kills her?" Breyer further argued that "This case is ultimately less about censorship than it is about education", believing that the Government has a vested interest in allowing parents to make decisions for their child as to "raise future generations committed cooperatively to making our system of government work", and that "California's law imposes no more than a modest restriction on expression." Breyer also expressed concern that the self-regulation of the industry still allowed for 20% of minors to purchase mature video games on a national average, and as high as 50% in the case of one nationwide chain, based on the aforementioned 2011 Federal Trade Commission study.

== Reactions ==
The ruling was praised by the video game industry, which had expected the law to be ruled unconstitutional, but sought affirmation by the Court. ESA's CEO, Michael Gallagher, responded that "The Court declared forcefully that content-based restrictions on games are unconstitutional; and that parents, not government bureaucrats, have the right to decide what is appropriate for their children." Bo Anderson of the EMA stated that "there now can be no argument whether video games are entitled to the same protection as books, movies, music, and other expressive entertainment", while Electronic Arts' (former) CEO John Riccitiello asserted that the decision "affirmed the constitutional rights of game developers". Other entertainment industries, such as the Motion Picture Association of America, also showed support for the Court's decision. Former U.S. Senator and current head of the Association Chris Dodd recognized that the motion picture industry has seen similar attempts to limit its freedom of expression, and that "We applaud the Supreme Court for recognizing the far-reaching First-Amendment implications posed by the California law."

Groups that supported the California law were critical of the decision. California State Senator Leland Yee was very critical of the decision, claiming that "It is simply wrong that the video game industry can be allowed to put their profit margins over the rights of parents and the well-being of children." Yee stated he would review the opinions and attempt to reintroduce a new bill within the constitutionality of the decision, and claimed it was "disappointing the court didn't understand just how violent these games are". James Steyer of Common Sense Media also criticized the decision, citing that "If parents decide a violent game is okay for their kid, that's one thing, but millions of kids are not able to judge the impact of ultra-violence on their own." Andy Schlafly, who had submitted a brief to the court on behalf of the Eagle Forum and Legal Defense Fund, heavily criticized the majority opinion, believing that "the court's latest disregard of parental rights is on a crash course with technological advances". Tim Winter of the Parents Television Council asserted that the Court's decision "replaces the authority of parents with the economic interests of the video game industry". The Washington Post opined that the California law "did nothing to infringe on the rights of adults" while dealing with "reasonable limitations on minors' access to extremely violent games that even the video game industry acknowledges are inappropriate", and that with the high bar for any future legislation, the onus is on the video game industry to maintain its self-policing of video game sales.

Analysts believed that while this was a major victory for the video game industry, the challenge is not yet over. Dan Offner, a partner for the video game industry analysis firm Loeb & Loeb believed that similar laws and regulations will be sought by State and Federal governments, as "the regulation of mature content with respect to minors as a hot button issue for the Federal Trade Commission and the various state governments". Other analysts cited that as more game content becomes available online as opposed to retail channels, the focus may shift more towards "privacy and security" of children and preventing children from amassing large fees from pay-to-use gaming services, pointing to a $3 million settlement that Playdom had to pay for violating privacy of its younger users. Sean Bersell of the EMA noted that future debates over violent video games may involve public opinion in addition to new legislation, noting that "Retailers along with publishers and parents all have a role in keeping kids away from these games." Seth Schiesel of The New York Times proposed that the Court's decision should be a challenge to the industry to show that they can mature on the decision that video games are a form of art, asking the industry: "Will you use it as cover to pump out schlock or will you rise to the opportunity and respectability that has been afforded you?" Schiesel also considered that even if games with increased interactivity and reality may make the games more dangerous, this could also make the player more aware of the potential consequences of his or her actions, even when such an action is made with the purpose to gain points/level or to kill a "dangerous enemy" in that game.

In January 2012, the state of California agreed to pay the ESA $950,000 for reimbursing the ESA's legal fees during the Supreme Court trial, atop approximately $350,000 in fees from the previous trials at lower courts. The ESA stated that it will use an unspecified portion of this money to help create after-school programs in "underserved" communities in the Oakland and Sacramento areas to help teach students job skills. The total cost of defending the case is estimated around $1.8 million, including the State's own legal costs.

In March 2012, Kenneth Doroshow and Paul M. Smith, the lawyers for the EMA who argued the case, were presented with the Ambassador Award by the Game Developers Choice Awards. The Ambassador Award "honors an individual or individuals who have helped the game industry advance to a better place, either through facilitating a better game community from within, or by reaching outside the industry to be an advocate for video games".

In a seminar given in November 2014, Justice Elena Kagan expressed her thoughts on the decision in this case, noting that for herself, she faced a difficult decision between what she felt was right – allowing parents to decide what their children should watch and play – and what the state of the law was, and in hindsight, was still not sure if they made the right decision. She noted that she, along with four others on the court, effectively added language to the decision that would preempt any future laws that attempted to restrict game sales.

Mike Gallagher, CEO of the ESA, observed in 2017 that the same moral panic that led to concerns over video games and resulting in this case were starting to appear for newer video game systems that can further blur lines between the virtual and real world, such as virtual reality, augmented reality, and mixed reality, and anticipates that there will be further tests of the applicability of First Amendment protection toward these new forms of media. Gallagher cites the AR-based game Pokémon Go as a good example of how the courts may re-examine the case.

=== Public opinion ===
A national telephone poll conducted in the second quarter of 2011 by Fairleigh Dickinson University's PublicMind showed that a majority of American voters (57%) agreed that states should have the "right to regulate the sale of video games [that are violent] in order to protect minors; the same way states regulate tobacco, alcohol and pornography". On the other hand, 39% of voters agreed with the Court's majority that "parents should make the decision" about what video games they purchase for their children, and what constitutes "too violent". These voters agreed with the statement "states do not have the right to decide that some video games are too violent for [minors], any more than they have the right to decide what literature or fairy tales are too violent". The poll was conducted before the Court released its decision on June 27, 2011.

== See also ==
- Video gaming in the United States
