= Ontario Film Review Board =

Former film classification organisation in Canada

Agency overview
- Formed: June 27, 1911
- Preceding agency: Board of Censors
- Dissolved: October 1, 2019
- Type: Crown agency
- Jurisdiction: Government of Ontario
- Key document: Film Classification Act, 2005

The Ontario Film Review Board (French: Commission de contrôle cinématographique de l’Ontario) was an agency of the government of the Canadian province of Ontario responsible for that province's motion picture rating system. The board reported to the Minister of Consumer Services until October 1, 2015 when the board was overseen by the Ontario Film Authority. The board's activities were based on the Film Classification Act, 2005.

The Ontario Film Authority, as well as the Ontario Film Review Board, were disbanded on October 1, 2019, with responsibility for film classification being transferred to the Ministry of Government and Consumer Services. Films were briefly deemed to have the same classification as those given by the British Columbia Film Classification Office, and adult films will be cleared for screening in Ontario if they have been approved by any jurisdiction in Canada. Ratings are now no longer required for movies to be shown in Ontario.

== History ==
A three-person Board of Censors was established on 27 June 1911 following passage of the Theatres and Cinematographs Act, 1911. The initial members were Chair George E. Armstrong, Robert Wilson and Otter Elliott. From that point, films to be shown in Ontario legally required review and approval by the board. The Board's censorship authority included newsreels, for example footage from a 1937 General Motors strike was banned "to avoid propaganda by either side."

The Board of Censors began to provide basic film classifications from 1 June 1946, initially as a year-long pilot project to designate certain films which were deemed inappropriate for children. Theatre operators were required to identify such films as "adult entertainment" on marquees and advertising. The Blue Dahlia and Her Kind of Man were among the first films to be identified as adult entertainment in Ontario.

Further changes to the Theatres Act in 1975 empowered what was now known as the Ontario Censor Board to review and censor videotapes and 8 mm film formats as well as conventional theatrical films. In the late 1970s and early 80s the Board was involved in a number of high-profile disputes with the Toronto International Film Festival (known then as the Festival of Festivals) over the Board's refusal to approve some films for screening without cuts, and for banning other films outright. In 1977, the board ordered cuts from the film Je, tu, il, elle which depicted two women having sex; the Festival pulled the film from its programme. In 1978, it demanded a 38-second cut from a love scene in In Praise of Older Women; director Robert Lantos agreed but at the last minute substituted the uncut version of the film. The screening was introduced by federal Secretary of State for Canada John Roberts who publicly denounced the board, telling the audience at the Elgin Theatre that “because of the actions of the Ontario censor it is time for an active affirmation that censors shouldn’t tell people what they should or should not see.” In 1982, the board refused to approve Pierre Rissient’s Cinq et la peau; instead of substituting another film, festival organizers protested the ban by posting a sign outside the theatre explaining why the screen was being kept dark.

The board's high profile actions against various films being screened at the festival had the unintended effect of raising their profile and audience interest. According to former festival director Helga Stephenson, “Silly old [Ontario Censor Board chairman] Mary Brown filled some theatres with some pretty tame stuff. The ranting and raving was a very good way to get the festival into the minds of the public, but internationally it was hugely embarrassing. And it filled the theatre with the wrong people, because they came looking for nothing but blow jobs, and they found themselves in the middle of a long, hard, boring film waiting for a few seconds of a grainy image showing something that looked vaguely like a male sex organ.”

In 1985, the name of the board was changed to the Ontario Film Review Board after the provincial government amended the Theatres Act. The Board composition changed from full-time civil servants to part-time members of the public. In 1988 festival films became exempt from review by the board provided the audience was limited to those eighteen and over.

In 2005, the original and much amended Theatres Act was replaced by the Film Classification Act.

In 2013, the Ontario Film Authority was incorporated. It entered into an agreement with the Minister of Consumer Services dated 5 May 2014. On 1 October 2015, an amendment to Ontario Regulation 187/09 came into effect, providing that the Ontario Film Authority is the sole administrative authority for the purpose of administering all provisions of the Film Classification Act, 2005 and the regulations made under that Act.

This restructuring of administrative oversight in 2015 was "part of a larger provincial initiative to streamline more than 200 boards and commissions", according to The Toronto Star.

=== Censored film cases ===
Significant cases have occurred where a film was either banned outright in Ontario, or certain scenes were ordered removed:

- 1926: Moana - the censor board would not approve this film unless 300 feet, or about 4% of the footage, was removed. The depiction of topless Samoan women in the production was cited as the cause for this censorship. The film was defended by artist Arthur Heming and others, while it was approved by film review authorities in Manitoba and Saskatchewan.
- 1940: The March of Time newsreel episode "Canada At War" was banned until the 1940 federal election was completed, as Premier Mitchell Hepburn charged that the production was "pure political propaganda for the Mackenzie King Government". The newsreel was allowed in Quebec where cinemas in Hull, Quebec reported significant audience levels.
- 1978: In Praise of Older Women - The Board requested a two-minute cut from this federally funded and Canadian made film, showing as the festival opener at the Toronto Film Festival. The cut was negotiated down to 38 seconds, but most sources claim an uncut version was shown at the festival. The offending scene was simulated sexual activity.
- 1978: Pretty Baby - The film was fully banned from Ontario as it depicted a prostitute who was a minor.
- 1980: The Tin Drum - Specific scenes were ordered deleted before the film could be shown in Ontario. The director and distributor initially refused to edit the film but eventually agreed to a compromise where the film would be distributed with fewer cuts than originally ordered.
- 2000: Baise-moi - This film originally played uncut at the Toronto Film Festival. When it was rated for general release, it was banned due to excessive explicit sexual content. The distributor resubmitted the film for consideration as an adult sex film, but it was banned due to sexual violence. Eventually the film was approved and rated R, after a small cut.
- 2001: Fat Girl - The Film Review Board ordered deletion of scenes from most of the film's 93-minute length, effectively banning the production. Scenes of sexuality involving a 13-year-old character were cited. The film's distributors filed an appeal with the Ontario Superior Court of Justice, but the Film Review Board reconsidered and passed the film intact for Ontario audiences before the appeal could be heard.

Several sources claim the Board banned the NFB anti-pornography documentary Not a Love Story. The Board was asked to rate this film, along with three others, submitted by a group of artists, known as the Ontario Film and Video Appreciation Society (OFVAS). The Board refused to view or rate Not a Love Story on the grounds that OFVAS did not own the film or have any distribution rights. Ratings were provided on the other films. The artists then took the Board to court over the ratings given, and the refusal to rate Not a Love Story. The Board's actions were challenged under the new Canadian Constitution.

The Ontario Divisional Court ruled in 1983 that film classification and censorship were justifiable under the Constitution. The court also determined that three of the Board's rulings were valid. Approval with time and place restrictions in the case of The Art of Worldly Wisdom and Rameau's Nephew was considered a "valid exercise of the Board's power." The Board's refusal to review Not A Love Story: A Film About Pornography was acceptable as the Board did not need to perform hypothetical reviews. The film had not been submitted for commercial distribution, and the judge noted "the applicants were seeking permission to show a film they did not own and which they had no right to exhibit." Concerning the Board's ban of the fourth film, Amerika, the court ruled that the Board had no legally defined rights to determine what the public could view. The government appealed to the Ontario Supreme Court, but the appeal was dismissed in 1984. The government subsequently added regulations to define the Board`s powers.

== Classifications ==
The board used the following motion picture rating system for theatrical releases in the province:

Ratings used from 1946 - 1953:

- (No classification) - Film appropriate for viewing by a person of any age.
- Adult Entertainment - Film may be viewed by persons of any age, although its content may not necessarily be suitable for children.

Ratings used from c. 1953 - 1981:

- (No classification) - Film appropriate for viewing by a person of any age.
- Adult Entertainment - Film may be viewed by persons of any age, although its content may not necessarily be suitable for children.
- Restricted - Film restricted to persons 18 years of age or older.

Ratings used from 1981 - 2003:

- Family - Film appropriate for viewing by a person of any age.
- Parental Guidance - Parents should exercise discretion in permitting a child to view the film.
- Adult Accompaniment - Film restricted to persons 14 years of age or older or to persons younger than 14 years of age who are accompanied by an adult.
- Restricted - Film restricted to persons 18 years of age or older.

The ratings used from 2003–present:

- General - Suitable for viewers of all ages.
- Parental Guidance - Parental guidance is advised. Theme or content may not be suitable for all children.
- 14A - Suitable for viewing by persons 14 years of age and older. Persons under 14 must be accompanied by an adult. May contain: violence, coarse language and/or sexually suggestive themes.
- 18A - Suitable for viewing by persons 18 years of age and older. Persons under 18 may attend but must be accompanied by an adult. May contain: explicit violence, frequent coarse language, sexual activity and/or horror.
- Restricted - Admittance restricted to persons 18 years of age and over. Content not suitable for minors. May contain: frequent use of sexual activity, brutal/graphic violence, intense horror and/or other disturbing content.

These ratings include a set of Content Advisories:

- Not Recommended for Children
- Not Recommended for Young Children
- Some scary scenes
- Cartoon/Animation action
- Mature Theme
- Violence
- Graphic Violence
- Brutal Violence
- Sexual Violence
- Crude Content
- Disturbing Content
- Frightening Scenes
- Nudity
- Sexual Content
- Explicit Sexual Content
- Gory Scenes
- Coarse Language
- Language May Offend
- Language Not Evaluated
- Subtitled
- Substance Abuse
- Tobacco Use

The primary reason for the addition of the 18A category was films such as Scary Movie and South Park: Bigger, Longer & Uncut.

== Adult Movies ==
Adult movies were given a sticker which denotes:

- Title
- Running Time
- Distributor ID
- Approval certificate number

== Chairs ==
Janet Robinson was the board's most recent Chair. The longest-serving chair was O. J. Silverthorne, who retired from that position after 40 years. The following people were appointed as Chair of the Board of Censors, and subsequently the Ontario Film Review Board.

- June 1911 - George E. Armstrong
- 1920 - Alex. S. Hamilton (d. 1926)
- 1926 - J. C. Boylen
- 1934 - O. J. Silverthorne
- October 1974 - Don L. Sims
- July 1980 - Mary Brown
- August 1986 - Anne Jones
- September 1989 - Robert Payne
- October 1992 - Dorothy Christian
- September 1994 - Leslie Adams
- August 1997 - Robert Warren
- November 2002 - Bill Moody
- October 2004 - Janet Robinson
