= Film Classification Act, 2005 =

Ontario, Canada statute

The Film Classification Act, 2005 (French: Loi de 2005 sur le classement des films) is a statute which governs motion picture and computer game ratings in the province of Ontario, Canada. The law also provides the legal basis for the activities of the Ontario Film Review Board. Prior to this, film censorship and classification in Ontario was mandated first by the Theatres and Cinematographs Act, 1911 then the Theatres Act, 1953.

== History ==
=== Theatres and Cinematographs Act, 1911 ===
Originally, motion pictures were reviewed and censored under the Theatres and Cinematographs Act which was passed on 24 March 1911 and established the Board of Censors, the first film review board in Ontario. The law was originally scheduled to be in force on 1 June that year, but was postponed until at least 20 June because of an illness of Arthur Matheson who as Ontario's treasurer was responsible for appointing the new board. This led to the creation of the Ontario Board of Censors of Moving Pictures which began operations on 27 June 1911. Each film shown in the province was required to be reviewed and approved by the Board which would then apply a "stamp" which would be displayed on theatre screens prior to the start of the film. Films which did not include the Board's stamp could be confiscated by authorities under the new law, which conversely prevented law enforcement officials from stopping the presentation of stamped films because of the film's content (section 6). Enforcement of the stamping provisions began after 1 December 1911, following the Board's initial task of reviewing 4000 extant films.

Section 10 of the original 1911 act prohibited children less than 15 years from attending a commercial film unless accompanied by an adult. This led to an unintended consequence where young girls would approach adult strangers to escort them to movies. There were recommendations that this provision be revoked or changed, especially since the film censorship regime would be deemed sufficient to protect children from inappropriate film content. In 1914, the provincial government introduced amendments to restrict eligible escorts to parents or legal guardians. Theatre operators were held responsible for ensuring that children were not being escorted by strangers.

After its first year, some film exhibitors would flout the law by removing certificate stamp images from films inspected by the Board of Censors then splicing these certificates to films which were not approved for Ontario audiences.

=== Theatres Act, 1953 ===
In 1953, the province replaced the Theatres and Cinematographs Act with a new law, the Theatres Act.

Significant amendments to the act and its regulations were made on various occasions. Videotape and 8 mm film classification was introduced in 1975, following concerns that pornographic presentations were being distributed in such formats beyond the purview of the Board of Censors.

In 1981, the Adult Accompaniment rating was introduced which allowed films to be classified so that children under 14 were restricted unless escorted by an adult. The classification was developed to open films of social significance to younger audiences which might otherwise have been restricted. In developing the new classification, provincial officials noted that the film One Flew Over the Cuckoo's Nest was restricted to adults only, although the film was based on a book that was studied by many high school students.

The provincial government introduced Bill 82 to change the Theatres Act in May 1984. The bill passed that December and took effect February 1985. These changes renamed the Board of Censors to the Ontario Censor Board the Ontario Film Review Board.

Rating categories were restructured again in 2001, with the introduction of the 18A rating which when applied to a film prohibits persons under 18 from attending unless accompanied by an adult. The Adult Accompaniment rating was renamed 14A but its effect was otherwise unchanged.

On 30 April 2004, the Ontario Superior Court of Justice found certain sections of the Theatres Act to violate the freedom of expression provisions of the Canadian Charter of Rights and Freedoms in the case of R. v. Glad Day Bookshops Inc.. The Ontario government modified the regulation under the Theatres Act was modified on 5 July 2004 to restrict the grounds on which a motion picture can be banned from Ontario, namely to pornographic films which involve violence, degradation or minors.

=== Film Classification Act, 2005 ===
The Legislative Assembly of Ontario introduced Bill 158, the Film Classification Act, for first reading on 9 December 2004. Minister of Consumer and Business Services Jim Watson introduced the legislation as a means of updating the film classification system while curtailing the censorship powers of the Ontario Film Review Board. The bill's second reading began on 15 February 2005 and was carried on 6 April. After review by the province's Standing Committee on Justice Policy, Bill 158 received its third reading on 19 May then was carried on division on 30 May with Royal Assent proclaimed on 13 June. The statute took legal effect on 31 August 2005.

The Film Classification Act, 2005 ended the provincial power to ban films, although film censorship powers would be retained for some cases of pornographic films. For video games, the Act also gave the province power to enforce the ratings system of the Entertainment Software Rating Board (ESRB), prohibiting the sale or exhibition of "Mature" and "Adults Only"-rated games to those under the age of 17 and 18 respectively. The OFRB had previously attempted to enforce such restrictions by classifying specific games as films, notwithstanding their rating.

The act itself specifies the general provincial powers of entertainment classification including the appeals process, licensing of distributors and exhibitors, powers of inspection and investigation and transition from the previous Theatres Act. Details of rating categories, licensing, and exemptions from classification are specified in the associated Ontario Regulation 452/05 which took effect at the same time as the act.
