= Family Entertainment Protection Act =

2005 proposed American law

- Long title: Family Entertainment Protection Act
- Acronyms (colloquial): FEPA
- Announced in: the 109th United States Congress
- Sponsored by: Hillary Clinton (D-NY)
- Number of co-sponsors: 3

Legislative history
- Introduced in the Senate as S.2126 by Hillary Clinton (D-NY) on December 16, 2005; Committee consideration by Committee on Commerce, Science, and Transportation

The United States Family Entertainment Protection Act (FEPA) was a failed bill introduced by Senator Hillary Clinton (D-NY), and co-sponsored by Senators Joe Lieberman (D-CT), Tim Johnson (D-SD) and Evan Bayh (D-IN) on November 29, 2005. The bill called for a federal mandate enforcement of the Entertainment Software Rating Board (ESRB) ratings system for video games in order to protect children from inappropriate content.

The FEPA would have imposed fines of US$1000 or 100 hours of community service for a first time offense of selling a "Mature" or "Adult-Only" rated video game to a minor, and $5000 or 500 hours for each subsequent offense. The bill also called for a FTC investigation into the ESRB to ascertain whether they have been properly rating games.

Similar bills have been passed in some U.S. states such as California, Michigan and Illinois, but were ruled to be unconstitutional in Brown v. Entertainment Merchants Ass'n, 564 U.S. 08–1448 (2011).

This bill did not become law; it was referred to the Senate Committee on Commerce, Science and Transportation and expired at the end of the 109th Congress without further action.

== Major Proposals ==
=== I. Prohibition on Selling Mature and Adults Only video games to minors ===
The centerpiece of this bill is a prohibition against any business for selling or renting a Mature, Adults-Only, or Ratings Pending game to a person who is younger than seventeen. On-site store managers would be subject to a fine of $1,000 or 100 hours of community service for the first offense; $5,000 or 500 hours of community service for each subsequent offense. This provision is not aimed at punishing retailers who act in good faith to enforce the Entertainment Software Ratings Board (ESRB) system. That's why retailers would have an affirmative defense if they were shown an identification they believed to be valid or have a system in place to display and enforce the ESRB system. Similar prohibitions had become law in the last several months in California, Michigan, and Illinois, but were later overturned.

=== II. Annual Analysis of the Ratings System ===
Since the bill relies on the video game industry to continue rating the appropriateness of games for minors, this bill requires an annual, independent analysis of game ratings. This analysis will help ensure that the ESRB ratings system accurately reflects the content in each game and that the ratings system does not change significantly over time.

=== III. Authority for the Federal Trade Commission (FTC) to Investigate Misleading Ratings ===
Part of the genesis of this bill was the revelation that the makers of Grand Theft Auto: San Andreas had included, through embedded code that was discovered and made accessible to the public, sexually explicit content inconsistent with the game's Mature rating (commonly known as the Hot Coffee mod). This bill requires the FTC to conduct an investigation to determine whether what happened with GTA: San Andreas is a pervasive problem. It also includes a Sense of Congress that the Commission shall take appropriate action if it determines that there is a pervasive problem.

=== IV. Authority to Register Complaints ===
This bill requires the Bureau of Consumer Protection (BCP) of the FTC to ensure that consumers can file complaints if they find content to be misleading or deceptive and requires the BCP to report on the number of such complaints to Congress.

=== V. Annual Retailer Audit ===
This bill authorizes the FTC to conduct an annual, random audit of retailers – sometimes referred to as a secret shopper survey – to determine how easy it is for young people to purchase Mature and Adults Only video games and report the findings to Congress.
