= Hot Coffee (minigame) =

Minigame in Grand Theft Auto: San Andreas

The player, as CJ (left), engaging in the "Hot Coffee" minigame

"Hot Coffee" is the unofficial name for a minigame in the 2004 action-adventure video game Grand Theft Auto: San Andreas by Rockstar Games. While it was not playable in the official game release, the modding community discovered hidden code that, when enabled, allows protagonist Carl "CJ" Johnson to have animated sexual intercourse with his in-game girlfriend.

Rockstar Games president Sam Houser wanted to include more role-playing elements in San Andreas while also pushing the Grand Theft Auto series' controversial reputation. The development team was forced to curtail the nudity and sexual content of Houser's original vision, however. This was necessary to avoid an "Adults Only" rating from the Entertainment Software Rating Board (ESRB), which most U.S. retailers would then refuse to sell. Rather than removing the content, the developers made it inaccessible to players. Modders discovered the code on the game's PlayStation 2 release, and when San Andreas was released for Windows, modder Patrick Wildenborg disabled the controls around the code. He released this modified code online under the name "Hot Coffee".

The discovery of the "Hot Coffee" minigame resulted in intense legal backlash for Rockstar Games and their parent company, Take-Two Interactive. While both companies remained mostly silent on the matter, Rockstar Games released a statement claiming that modders were responsible for the minigame. The ESRB upped the game's rating from "Mature" to "Adults Only" after an investigation, while the game was banned entirely in Australia until the explicit content was removed. Rockstar Games and Take-Two received a warning from the Federal Trade Commission (FTC) for failing to disclose the extent of graphic content present in the game, while a class action lawsuit alleged that the company had misled customers who believed the game's content fell along the lines of a "Mature" rating.

"Hot Coffee" had a major impact on the video game industry. Rockstar Games's refusal to publicly comment on the matter was poorly received by the industry and modding community, while the ESRB announced fines of up to US$1 million for game developers who failed to disclose the extent of their graphic content. "Hot Coffee" reappeared in future Rockstar Games releases: A similar mod for Red Dead Redemption 2 was posted on Nexus Mods in 2020 and subsequently taken down by Rockstar Games, while 2021's Grand Theft Auto: The Trilogy – The Definitive Edition, which includes a remaster of San Andreas, was briefly removed from sale after data miners discovered the code associated with "Hot Coffee".

== Gameplay ==
Rockstar Games, a subsidiary of Take-Two Interactive, released the action-adventure video game Grand Theft Auto: San Andreas for the PlayStation 2 on 26 October 2004. The game was subsequently released for Windows and the Xbox on 7 June 2005. The fifth entry in the Grand Theft Auto video game franchise and a sequel to 2002's Grand Theft Auto: Vice City, San Andreas expanded upon its predecessor with a virtual world four times larger than Vice City, as well as the introduction of more role-playing elements for its player character, Carl "CJ" Johnson. Prior to the release of San Andreas, the Grand Theft Auto series was popular among the modding community, with players known as "modders" hacking into a game's source code and creating modifications, or "mods". By introducing in-game character customisation options, San Andreas made game mods more accessible to those outside of the hacking community. Rockstar Games's president Sam Houser told reporters before the game's release that he "wanted to blur the lines more between what was in-mission and part of the story and your 'leisure time' in the game ... all of your actions feel like they have consequences, and you are always in the world".

San Andreas begins with CJ returning to his home state, the fictional San Andreas. Although there is an overarching plot, San Andreas is primarily an open world game, where narrative missions are supplemented by other activities and interactions that have little bearing on the primary mission. One open world task in which CJ may participate is romantic. San Andreas contains six unlockable girlfriends that can be discovered either through completing missions or by exploring the virtual world. Each girlfriend has preferences for CJ's appearance and date activities; if CJ impresses the girlfriend by catering to these preferences, the player unlocks certain rewards. When CJ has sufficiently impressed one of these girlfriends, she will invite him home "for some coffee", a euphemism for sexual intercourse. In the unmodified version of the game, the player hears muffled sexual sounds from inside the house, while the camera remains outside the front door and no explicit content is visible.

The modified version of San Andreas replaces this censored cutscene with the unused minigame found in the code. After receiving fellatio from his girlfriend, CJ assumes the missionary position. Both characters remain clothed as the player is instructed to "push the left analog stick up and down in rhythm", which increases CJ's progress on a bar graph labelled "Excitement". Button controls allow the player to change the camera angle or the sex position. If the excitement bar reaches completion, CJ's girlfriend and the game congratulate the player; if the meter empties, the player is criticised for "failure to satisfy a woman". There is also an erotic spanking mini-game in which the player must press buttons in rhythm, which results in CJ spanking his girlfriend and her excitement bar increasing.

== Development and discovery ==
=== Rockstar Games development ===
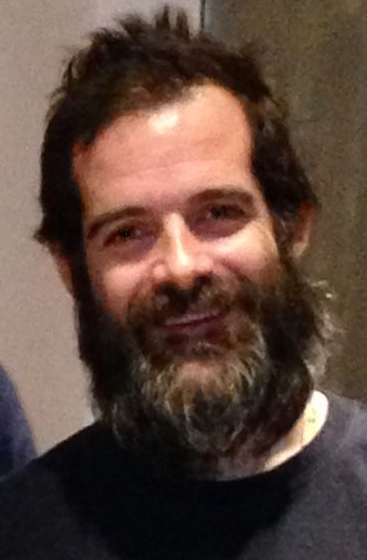
Sam Houser, the president of Rockstar Games, requested the inclusion of sexually explicit elements in San Andreas.

The first commercially successful game in the Grand Theft Auto series was Grand Theft Auto III. Upon its 2001 release, the graphic violence and sexual content in the game were met with controversy from politicians and other public figures such as Joe Lieberman and Jack Thompson. Both Grand Theft Auto III and its sequel Vice City received commercial success but faced scrutiny, particularly among those concerned about the impact of violent video games on children. Both games received an "M" ("Mature 17+") rating from the Entertainment Software Rating Board (ESRB) in the United States, and Houser responded to the criticism by stating that the Grand Theft Auto series, and video games as a medium, were not designed for children.

In an interview with 1Up.com prior to the release of San Andreas, Houser told reporters that the game was the "official conclusion to a trilogy" preceded by Grand Theft Auto III and Vice City. Houser and the creative team at Rockstar North faced two major challenges in the development of San Andreas: First, they wanted to implement more role-playing elements without turning the series "uber-nerdy". Furthermore, they were determined to "do everything possible to exceed people's expectations" beyond previous games in the series. By this point, games in the Grand Theft Auto series were expected to contain graphic violence, depictions of crime, and coarse language, and Houser believed that the way to "include new functionality and interaction in line with the 'vibe' of the game" was to branch into more explicit sexual content. The inclusion of sexual content in video games proved challenging for developers, as the medium was still seen primarily as entertainment for children. The inclusion of in-game nudity, for instance, was likely to earn San Andreas an "AO" ("Adults Only") rating from the ESRB, and such a rating would curtail the markets in which the game could be sold, putting a great financial burden on Rockstar Games in the process.

On 14 July 2004, Houser emailed Jennifer Kolbe, Rockstar Games's director of operations, with a list of the sexual content he planned to include in the game. This included oral sex, sexual intercourse, masturbation, erotic whipping, and dildos, both in-game and during cutscenes. Kolbe responded with concern that the graphic content would result in an AO rating, and the creative team began to research the content limits for video games in the United States. On 16 August, Rockstar Games co-founder Terry Donovan emailed Houser a list of alterations that developers would need to make to ensure that the game fell in line with video game content rating systems in all markets. While certain countries like Spain and Italy had more relaxed guidelines towards nudity and sexuality, the ESRB's strict limits on these situations drastically limited the content that Houser and Rockstar Games could include without receiving an AO rating. Because Houser received this list of alterations so close to the game's intended release date, there was insufficient time to remove any graphic content from the game without compromising the source code. Instead, developers rewrote the code so that the content was still present on the game disc, but controls made this content inaccessible to the player.

Houser emailed San Andreas producer Leslie Benzies on 25 November, after the PlayStation release of the game, to see "how hard we can push the sex stuff" on the impending Windows release. Houser's original plan was to release two versions of the game, one with an M and the other with an AO rating, but the sales department was concerned about the financial impact of releasing an explicit game. Instead, Rockstar Games decided to release the game in its M-rated form, with a later patch including more graphic content for players who desired. On 7 January 2005, Rockstar Games submitted the Windows and Xbox versions of San Andreas to the ESRB. Because the game was identical to the already-reviewed PlayStation 2 version, the company did not need to send the Board a content disc, and it was automatically given an M rating.

=== Modifications and discovery ===
Rockstar Games's decision to release San Andreas on the PlayStation 2 before Windows impacted the modding community, as console games were more difficult to hack into and alter than their PC counterparts. Unable to enact any major edits to the console's source code, modders instead accessed the file formats, planning the mods they would create for the Windows version upon its release. In December 2004, a group of modders, including Patrick Wildenborg, uncovered several character animations with file names including "SEX", "KISSING", "SNM", and "BLOWJOBZ". One modder, operating under the screen name Barton Waterduck, was able to preview the animations using character model sheets, and these previews confirmed their sexual nature. To overrule the control toggles around this hidden code, however, Wildenborg, Waterduck, and others had to wait until the game's Windows release.

Wildenborg was based in the Netherlands, where San Andreas would be released on Windows and the Xbox three days later than in North America, so he collaborated with a modder in the United States to gain early access to the game files. The American modder sent Wildenborg a copy of the game script, which Wildenborg altered with a hex editor to unlock the minigame and returned. At 11:37 p.m. (CEST) on 8 June 2005, Wildenborg received a video of the minigame that his modifications had unlocked. Wildenborg released the game patch on 9 June to GTAGarage.com, a Grand Theft Auto modding website. He named the patch "Hot Coffee" after the euphemism used in the game, and it was downloaded over 1 million times in a span of four weeks.

On the day it was released, Houser discovered the "Hot Coffee" minigame by browsing Grand Theft Auto message boards where it was being discussed. On the same day, Doug Lowenstein, then the president of the Entertainment Software Association, discovered the minigame by viewing a viral video of its content. Over the next month, Rockstar Games's public relations team were instructed not to respond to any requests for comment on the controversy. The only communication they offered was to Lowenstein and Patricia Vance, the president of the ESRB. Rockstar Games informed both parties that "Hot Coffee" was the result of a third-party modification and that they would comply with any forthcoming investigation.

== Response ==
=== Product rating and reissue ===
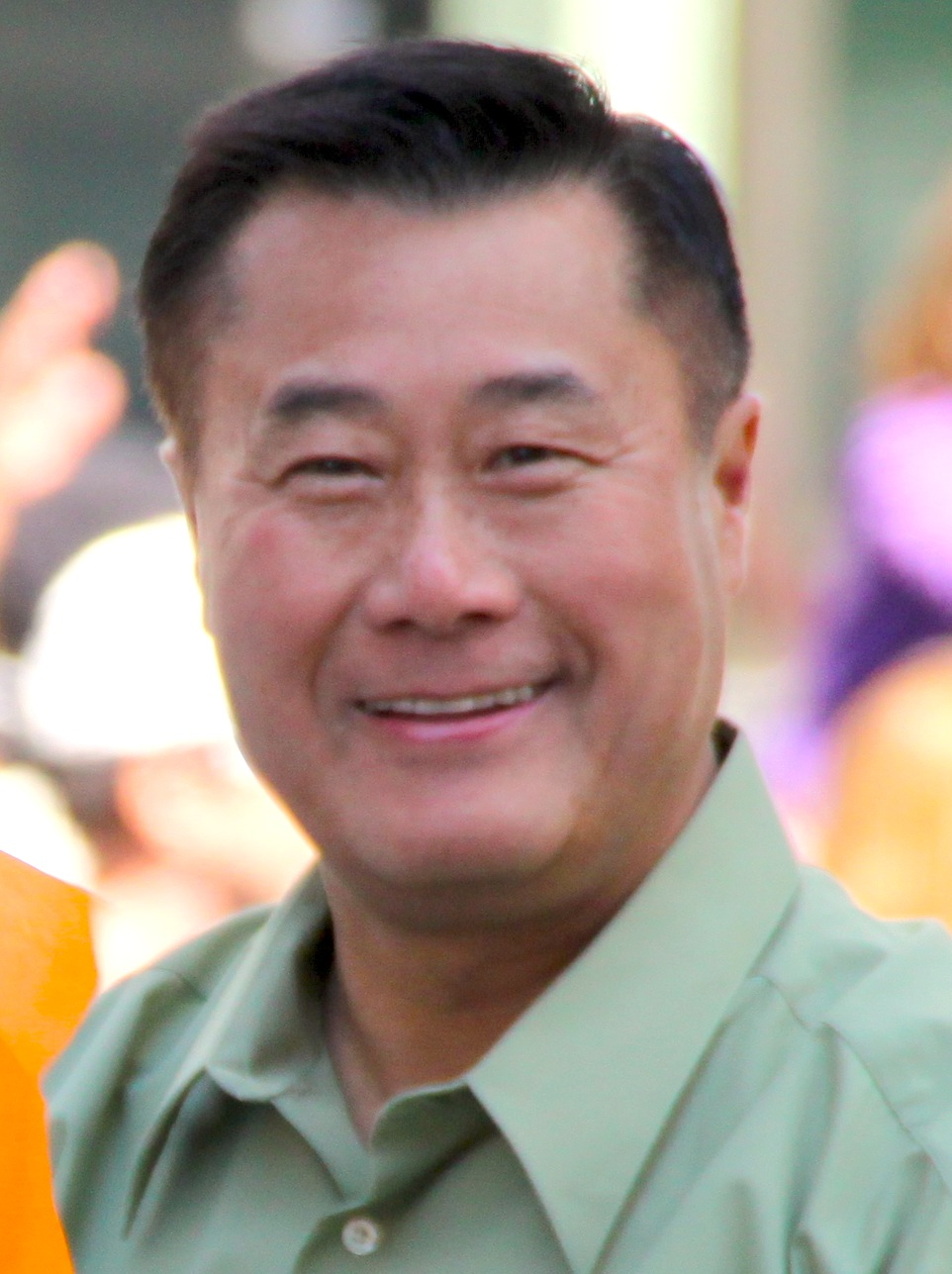
Leland Yee criticised the Entertainment Software Rating Board for not issuing San Andreas an AO rating.

On 7 July 2005, Leland Yee, the speaker pro tempore of the California State Assembly, issued a press release condemning the ESRB for not providing San Andreas with an AO rating for its violence and the explicit sexual activity in the "Hot Coffee" minigame. At the time, Yee had been promoting his bill AB 450, which would require the state of California to place warning labels on violent video games and require retailers to check for identification before selling these games to customers. On the following day, while Vance criticised Yee for his "crusade ... to undermine the integrity of the ESRB", she also announced that the Board had opened an investigation into "the circumstances surrounding the 'Hot Coffee' modification". On 12 July, meanwhile, the Australian Office of Film and Literature Classification (OFLC) announced that it was opening its own investigation into the game at the request of Philip Ruddock, the Attorney-General of Australia. The OFLC had originally rated San Andreas MA15+, which limited purchase to individuals aged 15 or older.

While "Hot Coffee" had been popular among the Grand Theft Auto modding community upon its release, Yee's comments drew the public's attention to the minigame. In a statement on his personal website, Wildenborg clarified that although he was not responsible for the creation of any explicit sexual material present in the game, such material was impossible to access without modifying the source code, and thus "Hot Coffee" could "therefore not be considered a cheat, Easter egg or hidden feature but is most probably just leftover material from a gameplay idea that didn't make the final release". On 14 July, Rockstar Games released a statement denouncing any responsibility for "Hot Coffee", stating that the minigame was "the work of a determined group of hackers who have gone to significant trouble to alter scenes in the official version of the game".

On 20 July 2005, the ESRB announced that all editions of San Andreas would be re-rated from M to AO. While acknowledging that Rockstar Games had not intended to make any graphic material accessible to customers, they issued the re-rating on the basis that the material was present "in a fully rendered, unmodified form on the final discs" of the game, which, "compounded by the broad distribution of the third party modification", undermined "the credibility and utility of the initial ESRB rating". As a result, major retailers such as Walmart, Target, Best Buy, and Circuit City announced that they would immediately cease all sales of San Andreas for as long as it was rated AO. On 29 July, the OFLC stripped San Andreas of its classification. Because Australia did not have an R18+ rating for games and it was used only for movies and TV shows at the time, the inclusion of explicit content instead resulted in a complete ban on sales of the game.

In response to the re-ratings, Take-Two suspended all production of San Andreas until they could release a version of the game that prohibited access to "Hot Coffee". On 11 August, Rockstar Games released a game patch disabling access to "Hot Coffee" for Windows customers. By September, San Andreas had been edited and released as an M-rated game for Windows and the Xbox. In November, Grand Theft Auto: San Andreas – Special Edition was released for PlayStation 2 without "Hot Coffee". Outside of the US, Rockstar Games released an edited version of the game in September 2015, which received an MA15+ rating in Australia.

=== Federal and legal action ===
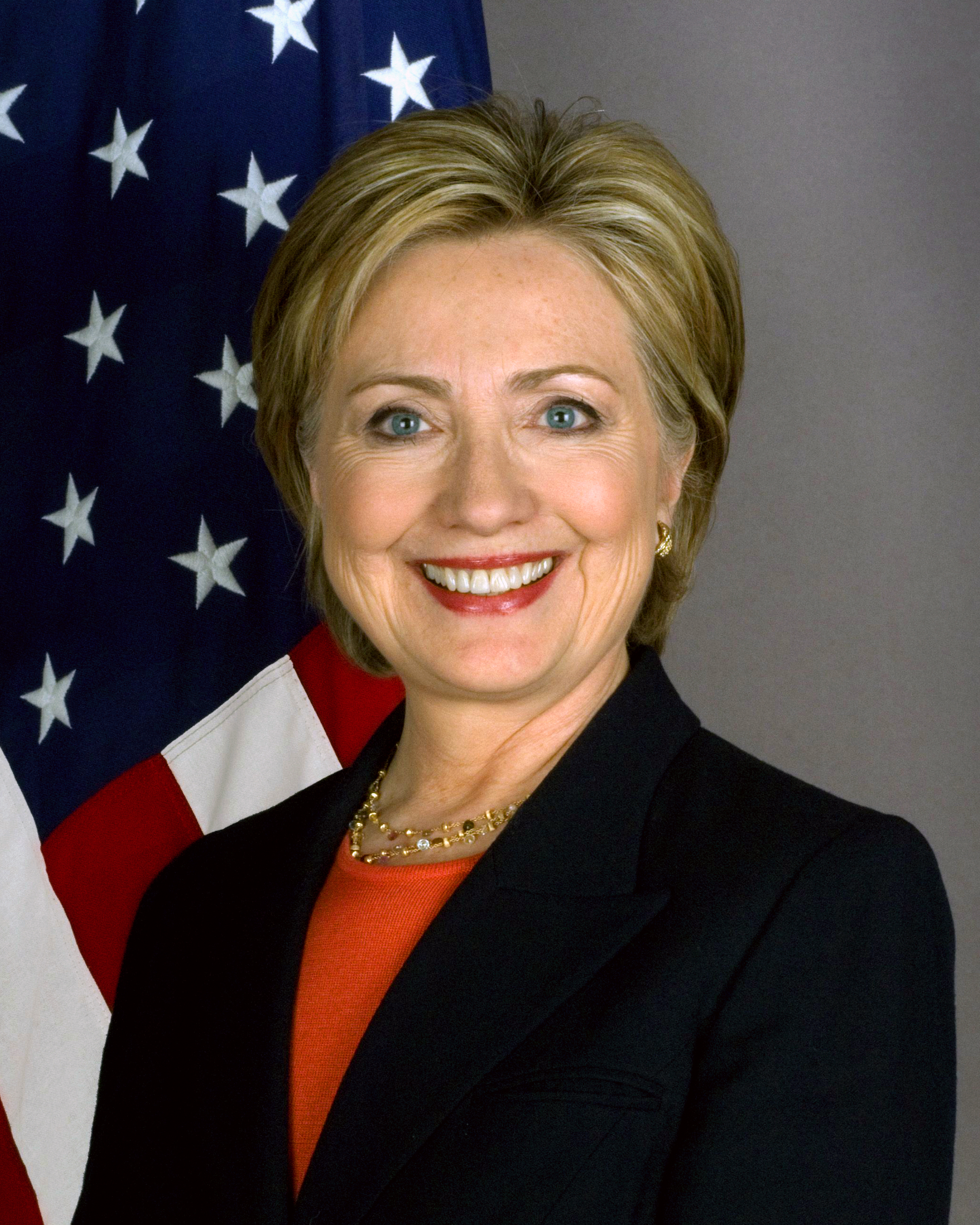
Hillary Clinton introduced the Family Entertainment Protection Act in response to the "Hot Coffee" scandal.

Following the ESRB's announcement that they were investigating San Andreas, U.S. Senator Hillary Clinton petitioned the Federal Trade Commission (FTC) to uncover the source of the game's "graphic pornographic and violent content", determine whether the game should receive an AO rating, and "examine the adequacy of the retailers' rating enforcement policies". Clinton further declared that she would begin work on a bill that would make it a federal crime, accompanied by a mandatory US$5,000 fine, to sell violent or sexually explicit video games to individuals under the age of 18. She filed the Family Entertainment Protection Act on 17 December 2005, with backing from fellow senators Joe Lieberman and Evan Bayh. In addition to preventing the sale of M- and AO-rated video games to minors, the bill recommended that the FTC check annually for hidden content in existing games, such as the code that led to the "Hot Coffee" mod. The bill was referred to the United States Senate Committee on Commerce, Science and Transportation, where it expired without action at the end of the 109th Congress.

Meanwhile, on 28 July 2005, the United States House of Representatives voted 355–21 to launch an FTC investigation against Take-Two and Rockstar Games with the intent of determining whether the developers had intentionally misled the ESRB on the content of San Andreas to avoid an AO rating. The parties reached a settlement on 8 June 2006, with the FTC ruling that Take-Two and Rockstar Games had violated the Federal Trade Commission Act of 1914 by failing to disclose the inclusion of "unused, but potentially viewable" nude imagery and sexual content in the game, regardless of whether the content was enabled by a third party. The settlement required that Take-Two and Rockstar Games "clearly and prominently disclose on product packaging and in any promotion or advertisement for electronic games, content relevant to the rating, unless that content had been disclosed sufficiently in prior submissions to the rating authority", with violations punishable by a fine of up to $11,000 (equivalent to $17,568 in 2025). The FTC opted not to fine either company for the "Hot Coffee" incident, but at the time of the decision, Take-Two had already incurred losses of $24.5 million (equivalent to $39.1 million in 2025) from the earlier recall.

=== Class action lawsuits ===
On 27 July 2005, an 85-year-old woman from New York filed a lawsuit against Rockstar Games and Take-Two in the United States District Court for the Southern District of New York. The woman had purchased the game for her 14-year-old grandson before it received its AO re-rating, and she alleged that Rockstar Games had engaged in false advertising, consumer deception, and unfair business practices by marketing the game under its initial M rating. A similar lawsuit was filed in January 2006 by the city of Los Angeles, headed by City Attorney Rocky Delgadillo. Several similar claims were ultimately consolidated into one case.

In October 2006, a federal judge ruled that the initial plaintiff could pursue class action status for her lawsuit. Settlement talks between the associated parties began in February 2007, and the case was settled on 28 January 2008. All customers who purchased the game before its ESRB re-rating were eligible for a claim up to $35 (equivalent to $52.34 in 2025). While San Andreas had sold over 21.5 million copies, fewer than 3,000 customers filed claims in response to this settlement. While attorneys had settled the case for $1.3 million, it would take less than $30,000 to resolve the submitted claims, and most of the settlement cost would be in legal fees. Rockstar Games also agreed to make a charitable donation worth $860,000 as part of the settlement. Because so few affected individuals pursued settlement claims, a judge decertified the settlement class on 31 July.

At the time of the "Hot Coffee" controversy, Take-Two was already under investigation by the United States Securities and Exchange Commission on charges of insider trading involving company founder and chairman Ryan Brant. This investigation culminated in a $7.5 million settlement on 9 June 2005. On 17 February 2006, Take-Two shareholders filed a class action lawsuit alleging that the company's mishandling of various financial aspects had caused a direct, negative impact on their earnings. One example of this financial mismanagement was the company's response to the "Hot Coffee" scandal. Plaintiffs alleged that Take-Two had engaged in a securities violation, as by "merely 'wrapping' rather than removing the Adult Content, Defendants knew that the Adult Content would inevitably be made widely available". This suit was settled on 2 September 2009, with Take-Two agreeing to pay over $20 million and enact changes to corporate governance policies and practices that would protect investors from future such issues. By this point, shareholders had voted to oust most of the executive leadership at Take-Two, with Strauss Zelnick named the new chief executive officer.

== Impact ==
=== Impact on the gaming industry ===
The "Hot Coffee" controversy and subsequent legal and financial action soured the relationships among Rockstar Games, the video game industry, and the modding community. By refusing to publicly comment on the ongoing scandal, Rockstar Games was accused of cowardice by Lowenstein, who said, "If you want to be controversial, that's great ... but then don't duck and cover when the shit hits the fan. Stand up and defend what you make." In a 2012 interview, Rockstar Games co-founder Dan Houser responded to the backlash surrounding Grand Theft Auto's controversial content, stating, "We never felt that we were being attacked for the content, we were being attacked for the medium, which felt a little unfair. If all of this stuff had been put into a book or a movie, people wouldn't have blinked an eye." The modding community, meanwhile, felt alienated by Rockstar Games's response to the controversy: in addition to taking the blame for the cultural fallout around "Hot Coffee", they were informed that future versions of the game would be "much more mod-resistant". GTAGarage.com voluntarily removed "Hot Coffee" amidst the controversy, but the negative response that the minigame generated resulted in a chilling effect. Some modders feared that all game alterations would be taken as intentionally hidden content, which could in turn lead to more legal restrictions on video games.

The "Hot Coffee" scandal also had a major impact on the ESRB and video game content rating in the United States, as the Board was forced to refine its submission and rating process to avoid additional scandal. In the year after San Andreas was reissued, The Elder Scrolls IV: Oblivion was re-rated from "T" ("Teen 13+") to M after the ESRB discovered "more detailed depictions of blood and gore than were considered in the original rating", as well as a locked skin which, if modded, allowed female characters to appear topless. Responding to both the Grand Theft Auto and Elder Scrolls incidents, the ESRB testified before the United States House Energy Subcommittee on Consumer Protection and Commerce that after that point, manufacturers who failed to disclose mature or explicit content would be punished with fines up to $1 million. In September 2006, Senator Sam Brownback introduced the Truth in Video Game Rating Act, which would require the ESRB to access the full content of games before issuing a rating, as opposed to relying on video demonstrations from game companies. Brownback introduced the bill to both the 109th and 110th Congress, and it expired without action at the end of both sessions.

=== Take-Two, Rockstar Games, and the Grand Theft Auto series ===
In June 2006, Take-Two cancelled Snow, a real-time strategy game about illegal drug trade that had been in production at its Frog City Software studio. While the publisher provided no reason for this decision, it was believed that it stemmed from the "increased political pressure" Take-Two was under, partially brought about by the "Hot Coffee" scandal. The lack of news about San Andreas's Japanese release by November 2006, six months after its announcement, was also partly attributed to "Hot Coffee".

Rockstar Games released Grand Theft Auto IV, the next game in the Grand Theft Auto series, on 29 April 2008, to critical and commercial acclaim. The game included an Easter egg referencing Hillary Clinton's involvement in the "Hot Coffee" controversy. In the game, the Statue of Happiness, a Statue of Liberty-type figure, bears a physical resemblance to Clinton holding a steaming cup of coffee in place of a torch, and the game file for the statue is named stat_hilberty01.wdr. Grand Theft Auto IV has an obtainable in-game achievement called "Warm Coffee", the criteria being to get protagonist Niko Bellic successfully invited inside a girlfriend's home for sex. The "Hot Coffee" scandal was mentioned again upon the 2014 release of Grand Theft Auto V, in which players could engage in sexual activity with prostitutes from a first-person perspective. Despite this mechanism, Grand Theft Auto V received an M rating from the ESRB.

In February 2020, a modification to Red Dead Redemption 2 was released on Nexus Mods that drew comparisons to "Hot Coffee". In the mod, protagonist Arthur Morgan meets a prostitute in a saloon and takes her upstairs to engage in sexual intercourse. Rockstar Games, who developed the Red Dead series as well as Grand Theft Auto, issued the modders a cease and desist letter stating that their creation had violated the game's end-user license agreement. The creators insisted that they had not violated service terms; despite their protest, the mod was taken down from Nexus Mods shortly after its release.

On 11 November 2021, Rockstar Games released Grand Theft Auto: The Trilogy – The Definitive Edition. Designed for Windows, the Nintendo Switch, PlayStation 4, PlayStation 5, Xbox One and Xbox Series X/S, The Trilogy is a remastered compilation of Grand Theft Auto III, Vice City, and San Andreas. Two days after its wide release, Rockstar Games announced that they were removing the Windows version from online purchase to "remove files unintentionally included"; this primarily referred to the game soundtrack, which included unlicensed songs, but some data miners claimed to have found "Hot Coffee" within the game's code. Three days after its removal, Rockstar Games made The Trilogy available for online purchase again.

== See also ==
- Jacked: The Outlaw Story of Grand Theft Auto
- List of AO-rated video games
- Sexual content in video games
- The Gamechangers
