= Valis II =

1989 video game

- PC Engine CD-ROM² cover art
- Developer: Laser Soft (Note: PC-8801, PC-9801, MSX2 and X68000 versions by Renovation Game, Sega Mega Drive/Genesis remake by Imaginative System Create (I.S.C. Co., Ltd.))
- Publishers: List: PC Engine CD-ROM²/TurboGrafx-CD; JP: Telenet Japan; NA: NEC PC-88, MSX2, PC-98, X68000; JP: Renovation Game Mega Drive/Genesis; JP: Laser Soft; NA: Renovation Products
- Director: Masami Hanari
- Producer: Fumiyuki Moriyama
- Designers: Hiroshi Akahori; Yukito Ohayashi
- Programmer: Masami Hanari
- Artists: Osamu Nabeshima; Tomokazu Tokoro
- Writers: Bunzō Matsui; Hiroshi Akahori
- Composers: Kenichi Kamio; Shinobu Ogawa
- Series: Valis
- Platforms: PC Engine CD-ROM²/TurboGrafx-CD, PC-8801, MSX2, PC-9801, X68000, Mega Drive/Genesis
- Release: 1989: PC Engine CD-ROM²/TurboGrafx-CD; JP: June 23, 1989; NA: May 23, 1990 PC-8801; JP: July 8, 1989 MSX2, PC-9801; JP: August 5, 1989 X68000; JP: November 18, 1989 Mega Drive/Genesis (remake); JP: February 14, 1992; NA: 1992
- Genres: Action, platform
- Mode: Single-player

Valis II (Note: ヴァリスII, Varisu Tsū) is a 1989 action-platform video game originally developed by Laser Soft, published by Telenet Japan and NEC for the PC Engine CD-ROM²/TurboGrafx-CD. A home computer version was released for PC-8801, MSX2, PC-9801 and X68000. A super deformed-style remake was also released in 1992 for the Sega Mega Drive/Genesis. It is the second entry in the eponymous series. It stars Yuko Asou, a Japanese schoolgirl teenager chosen to become the Valis warrior by wielding the titular mystical sword, after defeating the demon lord Rogles. The dream world Vecanti fell under the rule of emperor Megas, whose hatred towards his brother Rogles and bloodthirsty tendencies seeks to wipe out traces of the former tyrant, including his supporters. Gameplay varies between each version but all share similar elements, as the player explores and search for items and power-ups, while fighting enemies and defeat bosses.

Work on Valis II did not start for a period of two and a half years, as the team became understaffed when several members had left after Valis: The Fantasm Soldier. Telenet began shifting their focus in order to establish themselves in the LaserDisc market when the development moved toward. It was the first title created by Laser Soft, an internal gaming division of Telenet formed specifically to explore games for the CD-ROM format, and they also cooperated with Renovation Game (Reno), which handled the home computer version. The staff hired animators for the project, as people within the anime industry were becoming interested in the video game industry. Both the TurboGrafx-CD and computer versions were made simultaneously, but each under different development lines. The Genesis remake was slated for a European release by Ubi Soft, as part of a multi-game licensing deal with Telenet's North American subsidiary Renovation Products, but it was never officially released in the region. Each version of the game have since been re-released through download services for other platforms and compilations.

Valis II on the TurboGrafx-CD garnered generally favorable reception from critics since its initial launch, some of which reviewed it as an import title; praise was given to the audiovisual presentation for showcasing the potential of the CD-ROM format, but others felt mixed regarding various aspects. The home computer version carried sentiments similar to the original release, with some reviewers noting the overall dark tone of its plot. The Mega Drive/Genesis remake, however, received negative response from the gaming press. It was followed by Valis III (1990).

== Gameplay and premise ==
Gameplay screenshot of the original PC Engine CD-ROM²/TurboGrafx-CD version

As with its predecessor, Valis II is an action-platform game starring Yuko Asou, (Note: 麻生 優子 (Asou Yūko)) a Japanese schoolgirl teenager chosen to become the Valis warrior by wielding the titular mystical sword. It takes place after the defeat of demon lord Rogles (Note: ログレス (Roguresu)) at the hand of Yuko. Time passes, however, the dream world Vecanti fell under the rule of emperor Megas, (Note: めがす (Megasu)) whose hatred towards his brother Rogles seeks to wipe out any trace of the former tyrant, to the point of murdering any supporters Rogles might have had. Furthermore, his bloodthirsty tendencies recognize Yuko and the Valis sword as viable threats to his claim of the throne, and he orders his minions to eliminate her first before she has the chance to thwart him. Despite details of the gameplay varying between each platform, all versions do share several similar features with Castlevania II: Simon's Quest, and Castlevania III: Dracula's Curse as well.

The player controls Yuko through two-dimensional levels, battling enemies, jumping from ledge to ledge, and running until the player faces a boss at the end of each level. At certain points in the game, gameplay pauses, and cinematic cutscenes play regarding the game's storyline. The home computer versions feature two shoot 'em up-like stages where Yuko flies over a constantly scrolling background. This version also introduces a separate menu inventory where the player can choose power-ups found during levels, as well as costumes that alters Yuko's overall offensive and defensive attributes. The Mega Drive/Genesis remake is an amalgamation of both the PC Engine CD-ROM²/TurboGrafx-CD original and the home computer versions, featuring the ability to select power-ups and costumes. Yuko can also shoot projectiles upward against enemies. However, the game's physics are different, while characters interact via in-game text boxes.

== Development ==
Valis II on the PC Engine CD-ROM²/TurboGrafx-CD was the first title developed by Laser Soft, an internal gaming division of Telenet formed specifically to explore games for the CD-ROM format. It was directed by Masami Hanari, who acted as programmer, and produced by Fumiyuki Moriyama. Hiroshi Akahori, who co-wrote the game's scenario alongside Bunzō Matsui, and Yukito Ohayashi served as co-designers. Animator Osamu Nabeshima served as art director with Tomokazu Tokoro, best known for directing the anime series Haibane Renmei and Hellsing Ultimate, providing support as character designer. The soundtrack was co-composed by Kenichi Kamio and Shinobu Ogawa. Laser Soft also cooperated with Renovation Game (Reno), which handled the home computer version. Tadashi Tadami, Hiroyuki Kai, Hiroshi Yoshida, as well as Masayasu Yamamoto collaborated as main programmers of the PC-8801, MSX2, PC-9801, and X68000 versions respectively. Ogawa and Tenpei Sato co-arranged the mayority of music for the home computer version, with Sato focusing on tracks featured during animated cutscenes, while Masahiro Kajihara and an uncredited member under the pseudonym "Jizou Kurabo" each scored two pieces.

Yamamoto recounted the creation process and history of Valis II in a 2007 interview, explaining that work on the sequel did not start immediately and several members had left after Valis: The Fantasm Soldier, leaving the team were understaffed for a period of two and a half years. He stated that Telenet started shifting their focus to establish themselves in the LaserDisc market when development of the project went forward. Yamamoto claimed that the team made both the PC Engine CD-ROM² and home computer versions simultaneously, but remarked that each were created under different development lines. He also stated that the staff hired animators for the project, as people within the anime industry were becoming interested in the video game industry, and wanted them to employ similar production standards and methods they would use in anime series for the game.

== Release ==

Top: Valis: The Fantasm Soldier II (PC-8801 version showcased).
Bottom: SD Valis/Syd of Valis.

Valis II was first released for the PC Engine CD-ROM²/TurboGrafx-CD in Japan by Telenet on June 23, 1989, and later in North America by NEC on May 23, 1990. The home computer version was first released in Japan for the PC-8801 on July 8, 1989, then for the MSX2 and PC-9801 on August 5, and later for the X68000 on November 18 under the name Valis: The Fantasm Soldier II. (Note: 夢幻戦士 ヴァリスII (Mugen Senshi: Varisu Tsū)) These versions contained more graphic cutscenes, while the X68000 version featured improved visuals. The release of the computer versions were also supplemented with a soundtrack album, distributed in Japan by Toshiba EMI on August 27.

A remake for the Sega Mega Drive/Genesis, developed by Imaginative System Create (I.S.C.), was first released in Japan by Laser Soft as SD Valis (Note: ＳＤヴァリス (Esu Dī Varisu)) on February 14, 1992. Telenet also released the game through its subsidiary Renovation Products in North America as Syd of Valis in the same year. A European release was planned by Ubi Soft, as part of a multi-game licensing deal with Renovation, but it was never officially released in the region for unknown reasons. It features the same gameplay and plot as the TurboGrafx-CD original, but the character design was changed to a super deformed (SD) style, while the North American version incorrectly identifies Yuko as "Syd" and reuses artwork of another Telenet release called The Sugoroku '92: Nariagari Trendy (Note: ~ザスゴロク´92~ なりトレ (Suguroku '92: Naritore)) for its front cover.

A compilation titled Valis Visual Collection was released in 1993 by Telenet for the PC Engine CD-ROM², featuring the visual scenes from Valis II. The original PC Engine version, as well as the home computer versions, were re-released in digital form for Microsoft Windows through D4 Enterprise's Project EGG service. The game was included as part of the Valis: The Fantasm Soldier Complete compilation for Windows, published by Bothtec in 2004 under a limited run of 2000 copies, which came bundled with a bonus CD and a figure. In 2011, D4 Enterprise re-released the compilation with SD Valis and an additional title as Valis: The Fantasm Soldier Complete Plus, which came bundled with a CD soundtrack instead. The PC Engine version was also made available by Sunsoft as part of the "PC Engine Archives" line on the PlayStation Network in 2011.

In 2021, the media company Edia announced a reprint of the PC Engine version to commemorate the series' 35th anniversary. The PC Engine version was re-released physically and digitally as part of Valis: The Fantasm Soldier Collection for the Nintendo Switch in Japan by Edia on December 9, 2021. The physical edition of the collection is also planned for an English localization by Limited Run Games. This version was later re-released separately through the Nintendo eShop by Edia first in Japan on February 10, 2022, and later in Europe and North America in March 2022. The Genesis remake was included as part of Valis: The Fantasm Soldier Collection II for Switch. In 2023, the MSX2 version was included as part of Valis: The Fantasm Soldier Collection III for Switch.

== Reception ==
Reception

Review scores
Publication	Score
Electronic Gaming Monthly	7/10, 8/10, 7/10, 7/10
Famitsu	5/10, 6/10, 7/10, 5/10
Génération 4	70%
Joystick	92%
The Games Machine (UK)	74%
Tilt	15/20
Computer+Videogiochi	76%
TurboPlay	3/5

Valis II on the PC Engine CD-ROM²/TurboGrafx-CD garnered generally favorable reception from critics since its initial launch, some of which reviewed it as an import title. The Games Machine's Warren Lapworth lauded the anime-style cutscenes for showing off the PC Engine CD-ROM's capabilities, while finding the game's action to be simple but enjoyable. However, Lapworth felt that the in-game graphics were uninteresting due to the drab and repetitive backgrounds, and expressed similar thoughts regarding the sprites. Joystick's Jean-Marc Demoly commended the increasing difficulty of each level that contributed to its playability, as well as the game's visuals for the original and well-drawn enemy sprites, controls and sound, but noted that Yoko's animation lacked flexibility. Génération 4's Philippe Querleux gave positive remarks to the soundtrack and save system, finding it to be a very addictive title, but noted its increasing difficulty starting from the third level. An editor for TurboPlay was impressed by the game's visuals and music but disappointed by its perceived low difficulty.

Tilt's Alain Huyghues-Lacour commended the game for its graphics, animation and audio for showcasing the potential of the CD-ROM format. Electronic Gaming Monthly's four reviewers praised the intermission scenes, CD-quality soundtrack, and visuals. They also found the story entertaining, but its short length and low difficulty were faulted. Computer+Videogiochi, the Italian edition of British gaming publication Computer and Video Games, compared the game with Rastan but noted its variety and animated sequences. In contrast, Hardcore Gaming 101's Kurt Kalata criticized its linear stages for being dull and boring, English dub and overall audiovisual presentation, regarding Valis II as "just a very mediocre and forgettable action game, only memorable for some nice creepy enemy sprites."

=== Home computers ===
Reception (Home computers)

Review scores
Publication	Score
MSX Magazine	(MSX2) 7/6/7
Software Gids	(MSX2) 5/5
Technopolis	(PC-8801) 6/7

Valis: The Fantasm Soldier II on home computers carried sentiments similar to the original release. Micom Basic Magazine analyzed the PC-8801 version, praising the amount of visual scenes compared to the original Valis: The Fantasm Soldier, background music and audio but criticized the overall graphical quality due to the limited colors. Technopolis' Gēzō also analyzed the PC-8801 version and commended the music, graphics, and variety of selectable suits. The writer also expressed that the game's story "makes me cry". Japanese publication MSX Magazine reviewed the MSX2 version, giving positive ratings for its playability, visuals, scenario, and overall value. Software Gids' Dennis Lardenoye also reviewed the MSX2 version, giving positive remarks to the visuals, sound, and overall game quality. Oh!X's Hiroyuki Urakawa reviewed the X68000 version, noting the overall dark tone of its plot. In the same retrospective outlook discussing the original TurboGrafx-CD release, Kurt Kalata of Hardcore Gaming 101 found it to be a better-designed title than the first entry but criticized the 8-bit computer version for the choppy action, finding the X68000 version to be more enjoyable.

=== Mega Drive/Genesis ===
Reception (Mega Drive/Genesis)

Review scores
Publication	Score
Beep! MegaDrive	5.0/10
Consoles +	36%
Famitsu	18/40
Games-X	2/5
Joypad	63%
Joystick	56%
Video Games (DE)	46%
Console XS	65/100
MegaTech	47%
Sega Pro	65%

SD Valis/Syd of Valis received negative response from the gaming press. It received scores of 19.5 out of 30 and 3.9718 out of 10 in public polls taken by Mega Drive Fan and the Japanese Sega Saturn Magazine respectively. Games-X criticized its gameplay, short length, and overall presentation. Consoles +' Navarro and Laurent Defrance commended the audio and manga-style character sprites but faulted their small size. They also criticized the game's imprecise scrolling, playability, and length. Joypad's Olivier Prézeau gave positive remarks to its audiovisual presentation and controls, however Joystick's Jean-Marc Demoly found it unpleasant to play, stating that "Syd Of Valis is a game that I strongly advise against, unless somewhere deep inside you, a small dose of masochism is present." MegaTech's Mark Patterson and Paul Glancey lambasted its presentation for the lack of options, simplistic sprites, and low sound quality. Both Patterson and Glancey summarized that it was a "pretty poor attempt at producing a cute beat 'em up."

Sega Force's Paul Mellerick bashed its "very dull" gameplay despite "great" levels and enemies, writing that "even platform addicts will only play it for a while". Sega Pro's James Scullion gave SD Valis a mediocre outlook, recommending saving money for some other game. Console XS found it "mildly disturbing" due to the visual style. Video Games' Michael Paul faulted the controls for being slippery and imprecise, while gearing his criticism towards the graphical design, low-detailed sprite animations, audio, and repetitive enemy patterns. In contrast to most reviewers, GamePro's Feline Groovy gave high marks to the visuals, sound, controls, and fun factor. In a retrospective article from Hardcore Gaming 101 dedicated to the SD remake, Kurt Kalata noted that the game's level design was improved over the original Valis II but equally dull.
