= Valis: The Fantasm Soldier =

1986 video game

- Home computer cover art
- Developer: Wolf Team (Note: Ported to Family Computer by Telenet Japan, Sega Mega Drive/Genesis and PC Engine Super CD-ROM² by Riot, Mobile phones by R-Force Entertainment.)
- Publishers: Telenet Japan: Tokuma Shoten (FC); Mega Drive/Genesis; JP: Riot; NA: Renovation Products; Riot (PCE SCD-ROM²); Bandai Networks (Mobile)
- Producers: Hiroki Hayashi; Yukio Mitsuhashi
- Designer: Hiroki Hayashi
- Programmers: Masahiro Akishino; Masayasu Yamamoto; Tomoki Anazawa
- Artist: Hiroki Hayashi
- Writers: Hiroki Hayashi; Yukio Mitsuhashi
- Composer: Shinobu Ogawa
- Series: Valis
- Platforms: MSX, PC-8801, X1, FM-7, PC-9801, Family Computer, Sega Mega Drive/Genesis, PC Engine Super CD-ROM², Mobile phone
- Release: November 26, 1986: MSX; JP: November 26, 1986 PC-8801, X1; JP: December 1986 FM-7; JP: March 1987 PC-9801; JP: April 1987 Family Computer; JP: August 21, 1987 Mega Drive/Genesis; JP: December 27, 1991; NA: 1991 PC Engine Super CD-ROM²; JP: March 19, 1992; WW: March 2022 Mobile phone; JP: May 18, 2005
- Genres: Action, platform
- Mode: Single-player

Valis: The Fantasm Soldier (Note: Japanese: 夢幻戦士ヴァリス, Hepburn: Mugen Senshi: Varisu; lit. "Dream Soldier: Valis") is a 1986 action-platform video game originally developed by Wolf Team and published by Telenet Japan for the MSX, PC-8801, X1, FM-7, and PC-9801 home computers. It is the first entry in the Valis series. It stars Yuko Asou, a Japanese teenage schoolgirl chosen as the Valis warrior and wielder of the mystical Valis sword to protect the Earth, the land of spirits, and the dream world Vecanti from demon lord Rogles. Throughout the journey, the player explores and search for items and power-ups, while fighting enemies and defeating bosses to increase Yuko's attributes.

Programmers Masahiro Akishino and Osamu Ikegame began planning on a side-scrolling action game featuring a customed delinquent heroine, an idea originated from Sukeban Deka to compete in a contest sponsored by Japanese computer magazine Login, being kept secret within Telenet until they approved development to continue when the company learned of its existence. After a Telenet superior expressed disliking towards its graphics, writer Hiroki Hayashi was ordered to take action and fix it, leading to the conception of Valis. Akishino and Hayashi used Ikegame's work as basis to introduce their own story and character ideas, which were based on an unfinished personal novel Hayashi wrote prior to the game's production.

Valis sold well and was listed as one of the best-selling games in 1987 rankings. A reworked version was also released for the Family Computer, followed by remakes for the Sega Mega Drive/Genesis and PC Engine Super CD-ROM², and a version for mobile phones as well. The game was supplemented with manga adaptations, an anime short by Sunrise, albums from King Records and Wave Master, and doujinshi books. Critical reception has varied depending on the version; the original MSX version garnered mixed reviews while the Genesis remake carried average sentiments, however the enhanced PC Engine remake was received more favorably. It was followed by Valis II (1989).

== Gameplay and premise ==
Gameplay screenshot of the MSX version

Valis: The Fantasm Soldier is an action-platform game starring Yuko Asou, (Note: 麻生 優子 (Asou Yūko)) a Japanese schoolgirl teenager who is fated to protect three different realms – the Earth, the land of spirits, and the dream world Vecanti. The demon lord Rogles (Note: ログレス (Roguresu)) extinguishes a light, which acts as a source of power for the inhabitants of Vecanti. In a desperate plea for salvation, the queen of Vecanti, Valia, (Note: ヴァリア (Varia)) reaches out for a brave soul who can help them in their time of despair, with Yuko being the one who answers the call. Yuko is magically summoned into becoming the Valis warrior by wielding the titular sword to liberate Vecanti from the evil of Rogles. Yuko's classmate, Reiko Kirishima, (Note: Kirishima Reiko (桐島 麗子)) is brainwashed by Rogles into helping him and destroy Yuko.

Gameplay varies depending on the platform, but each version retains the same basic plot; in the original MSX, PC-8801 and X1 versions, as well as the FM-7 and PC-9801 ports, Valis is a side-scrolling game where the player controls Yuko to fight through each level's enemies while jumping across ledges, exploring and searching for items and power-ups, before confronting a boss at the end of each level to increase Yuko's maximum health and attributes. At certain points in the game, gameplay pauses, and cinematic cutscenes play regarding the game's plot. The Family Computer version differs considerably from the other versions, being more akin to a side-scrolling action role-playing game. It is a more difficult game due to its larger maze-style levels with multiple paths, and a lack of a password or save feature.

The Mega Drive/Genesis remake exhibits a gameplay system more similar to later games in the Valis series, particularly Valis III; the d-pad moves the main character and three buttons allow Yuko to perform three actions: sliding, jumping, and swinging her sword, which can be upgraded three times. The player can also use magic spells, gaining them after defeating bosses. The PC Engine Super CD-ROM² remake features changes to the gameplay system (e.g. single high jumps instead of two-phase jumps, a sliding move damaging enemies) and voiced cutscenes. The mobile phone version further added new stages and alternate costumes.

== Development ==
Character artwork by Hiroki Hayashi of the unnamed main protagonist from Shoujo Furyou Densetsu, before it was morphed into Valis: The Fantasm Soldier

Valis: The Fantasm Soldier was developed over the course of half a year by Wolf Team, an internal gaming subsidiary of Telenet Japan founded in 1986. It was co-produced by conceptual designer Hiroki Hayashi and Yukio Mitsuhashi, both of whom acted as co-designers and co-scenario writers as well. Masahiro Akishino provided additional scenario support and served as programmer of the PC-8801 version. Former Compile staffer Tomoki Anazawa and Masayasu Yamamoto served as main programmers for the MSX and X1 versions respectively. Hayashi also acted as art director, with Daisuke Kiyasu, Hiroshi Toriumi, Makoto Takahashi, Mitsuru Takahashi, Shinichi Shiino, and Tsuyoshi Tanaka being responsible for the graphics. The music was composed by Shinobu Ogawa.

Akishino and programmer Osamu Ikegame started planning on a project tentatively titled Shoujo Furyou Densetsu, (Note: 少女不良伝説 (Shōjo Furyō Densetsu)) a side-scrolling action game featuring a customed delinquent heroine, who would have served as a vehicle to showcase the action. The idea originated from Sukeban Deka, particularly the live-action television adaptation, as both Akishino and Ikegame were fans of the series. The project was made as an entry for "Program Olympics", a contest sponsored by Japanese computer magazine Login where game developers created software to compete. The game was kept secret within Telenet, but when the company learned of its existence, they approved development to continue.

Yamamoto was set to work on the game Final Zone Wolf, before being switched to Shoujo Furyou Densetsu due to staff shortage. Hayashi joined the staff after development of Final Zone Wolf had finished, helping with making various settings and drawing character artwork of the unnamed main protagonist. One day, a Telenet superior came to the development room to inspect the situation and expressed disliking towards the project, particularly its visuals. Hayashi, to his surprise, was ordered to take action and fix it, which led to the conception of Valis on the spot as Hayashi had an image of a girl fighting with a magical sword.

Akishino and Hayashi used the project Ikegame was creating prior to quitting Telenet as a basis to introduce their own story and character ideas. Hayashi was responsible for the designs of Yuko and Reiko. The idea for Valis was based on an unfinished personal novel revolving around the light and darkness of the human heart Hayashi wrote prior to development, featuring Yuko and Reiko as main characters. Hayashi used his novel as reference for the game's plot and worldview, which was written in parallel with Shoujo Furyou Densetsu. Yamamoto calculated the number of needed tiles for each level early in development, reckoning that using 32x32 sprites would require 1024 tiles for stage maps and began making his own data under this assumption. Knowing that the sales team used a program's size and character sprites as marketing ploys, Yamamoto told a Telenet sales staffer that they should be able to scroll large maps.

Kouji Yokota served as graphic designer for the Family Computer version. Yokota joined Telenet after being introduced to a senior staffer via an acquaintance and applying for a job interview. Yokota particularly cited the story and visual design of Valis as his reasons to join Telenet. Due to the Family Computer having limited memory compared to home computers and the available memory mapper chips (MMC) being a concern, Yokota implemented a mirroring technique to reuse sprites in order to create the graphics. Because the original version featured multi-directional scrolling not possible on the Family Computer, and games on the platform at that time had either vertical or horizontal scrolling, Yokota and the staff were forced to take a different approach. The team added changes and revisions to the game's design, introducing an exploration component and more complex maps to deepen its gameplay. Yokota has since regarded the Family Computer version to be a remake rather than a port.

== Release ==
Valis: The Fantasm Soldier was first published for the MSX in Japan on November 26, 1986, by Telenet Japan. It was followed by conversions for the PC-8801 and X1 computers on December of that year, as well as for FM-7 and PC-9801 computers in 1987. These versions were handled by Wolf Team. Telenet would later develop a reworked version of Valis for the Family Computer, published only in Japan by Tokuma Shoten on August 21 of the same year. On December 27, 1991, a remake of Valis for the Sega Mega Drive/Genesis was developed and published in Japan by Riot, another game development division of Telenet. This version features character artwork by Osamu Nabeshima. Telenet also released the game through its subsidiary Renovation Products in North America. A European release was planned by Ubi Soft, as part of a multi-game licensing deal with Renovation, but it was never officially released in the region for unknown reasons. In 1992, an enhanced remake for the PC Engine Super CD-ROM² was also developed and published by Riot. This version introduced voice acting, with Yuko Asou being voiced by Sumi Shimamoto.

The MSX version was first re-released in digital form for Microsoft Windows through D4 Enterprise's Project EGG service and the i-Revo store front. The Genesis and PC Engine remakes were also re-released digitally on Project EGG. The PC-88 version was re-released via Project EGG as well. The game is found in the Valis: The Fantasm Soldier Complete compilation for Windows, published by Bothtec in 2004 under a limited run of 2000 copies, which came bundled with a bonus CD and a figure. In 2011, D4 Enterprise re-released the compilation with two additional titles as Valis: The Fantasm Soldier Complete Plus, which came bundled with a CD soundtrack instead. In 2005, Bandai Networks collaborated with developer R-Force Entertainment to produce a version for Yahoo! Keitai-compatible mobile phones, published through SoftBank's S! Appli service on May 18. The PC Engine remake was made available by Konami as part of the "PC Engine Archives" line on PlayStation Network in 2010, and was given away for free to Japanese PlayStation Plus subscribers in 2014.

In 2021, the media company Edia announced reprints of Valis and its two sequels for the PC Engine to commemorate the series' 35th anniversary. The PC Engine remake and its two follow-ups were re-released physically and digitally as part of Valis: The Fantasm Soldier Collection for the Nintendo Switch in Japan by Edia on December 9. The physical edition of the collection is also planned for an English localization by Limited Run Games. This version was later re-released separately through the Nintendo eShop by Edia first in Japan on February 10, 2022, and later in Europe and North America on March. The Genesis remake was included in the Renovation Collection 1 compilation released by Blaze Entertainment for Evercade, and was also included along with the MSX version as part of Valis: The Fantasm Soldier Collection II for Switch. That same year, publisher Retro-Bit announced a re-release of the Genesis remake as part of a collection. The MSX and Genesis versions were later re-released separately via eShop by Edia in Japan on December 22. In 2023, the PC-8801 and Family Computer versions were included as part of Valis: The Fantasm Soldier Collection III for Switch. In 2024, Edia released the Valis: The Fantasm Soldier Collection on Steam.

=== Other media ===
The release of Valis was supplemented by a manga adaptation in Tokuma Shoten's Wanpaku Comic magazine that ran between September and October 1987, written and illustrated by Susumu Kobayashi. To promote the Family Computer version, a three-minute anime short by Sunrise, directed by Hideaki Anno and Katsuhiko Nishijima, featuring music by Kohei Tanaka, was included in the November 1987 issue of the VHD magazine Anime Vision. The videogame was featured as a central plot element in the 1987 movie, Pleasure Kill (暴行本番) by Hisayasu Satō. It received an album containing the original soundtrack and other Telenet titles, distributed in Japan by King Records in 1988. It was one of several video games adapted by Kouta Hirano into a manga titled Susume!! Hijirigaku Dennou Kenkyuu Bu, (Note: 進め！！静学電脳研究部 (Susume!! Hijirigaku Dennō Kenkyū Bu)) published by Shinseisha as part of their Gamest Comics collection on April 25, 1999. Between 2007 and 2008, Hiroki Hayashi published three doujinshi books at Comiket under the pseudonym "PiXEL". In 2011, an album containing orchestral arrangements of the game's music was released by Wave Master. In 2022, Kobayashi's manga adaptation was reissued by Tokuma Shoten as an ebook.

== Reception ==
Reception

Review scores
Publication	Score
Micromanía	8/10
Arcades	9/10
MSX Gids	4/5
MSX Magazine	4/5

Valis: The Fantasm Soldier garnered mixed reception from critics, most of which reviewed the MSX version as an import title. According to Masayasu Yamamoto, it sold "very well" and was listed as one of the best-selling games in 1987 rankings. Japanese publication MSX Magazine gave high praise to its graphics, character sprites, music, and playability. French magazine Micro News regarded it as a strange game, noting its characters and setting, as well as the frenetic but stressful gameplay. Arcades' Laurence Le Gentil found it to be a poorly designed and difficult game, criticizing the jerky movement, language barrier and enemy sprites for being "almost transparent", but commended its fast-pacing and music. Micromanía's José Miguel Rodríguez gave positive remarks to the game's backgrounds for their graphical quality, addictive nature and originality, noting its increasing difficulty curve and recommending it for "those who are able to enjoy shooting frantically for hours", but criticized its repetitive sprites.

Reviewing for the Spanish magazine MSX Club, the group MSX Boixos Club gave it a high recommendation for its audiovisual presentation, smooth movement, and addictive factor. Echoing a similar opinion as MSX Magazine, MSX Gids' Alfred Debels and José Herps praised the visuals, sound, and overall quality. In contrast, MSX Club Magazine's Jan van Roshum liked the visuals but lambasted its difficult nature. The Family Computer version received an 18.17 out of 30 score in a public poll taken by Family Computer Magazine. In a retrospective outlook, Hardcore Gaming 101's Sam Derboo highlighted its cinematic cutscenes and chiptune music, but ultimately found the original computer versions unplayable. Derboo further described the Family Computer version as a competent but frustrating action role-playing game.

=== Mega Drive/Genesis ===
Reception (Mega Drive/Genesis)

Review scores
Publication	Score
Aktueller Software Markt	5/12
Beep! MegaDrive	5.75/10
Consoles +	76%
Famitsu	5/10, 6/10, 6/10, 5/10
Joystick	65%
Video Games (DE)	51%
Sega Pro	75%
Sega Visions	65/100

The Sega Mega Drive/Genesis remake of Valis: The Fantasm Soldier carried the same average sentiments as the original release from Japanese and Western gaming publications, some of which also reviewed it as an import title. It also received scores of 19.22 out of 30 and 4.909 out of 10 in public polls taken by Mega Drive Fan and the Japanese Sega Saturn Magazine respectively. Famitsu's four reviewers felt that it closely followed the Family Computer version. Consoles +'s Kaneda Kun found it to be a competent conversion, commending the overall presentation, graphics, animations, music and longevity, but felt mixed regarding its slow playability. Joystick's Olivier Prézeau gave it a more mixed outlook, citing its slow action and short length. Video Games' Andreas Knauf expressed mixed feelings regarding the game's graphical quality and criticized the sound effects, but highlighted its soundtrack in a positive manner. Sega Force's Adrian Pitt bashed its "dull and repetitive" gameplay and declared the following: "High graphical content, low playability level. That's Valis in a nutshell."

Sega Visions regarded it as a fun game, citing its large bosses and cinematics. They also praised the audiovisual presentation, but felt it lacked the depth and challenge compared to other action games, and noted that the slow movement of both Yuko and her enemies may alienate experienced players. Aktueller Software Markt's Heinrich Stiller gave positive remarks to the colorful visuals and audio, but criticized its jerky scrolling, slow pacing, and low difficulty. GamePro's Abby Normal gave high remarks to the Genesis release for its graphics, sound, controls, and fun. Sega Pro wrote that "it's not worth bothering with this cart (...). If you must, dig it out for a laugh." An editor for the Japanese gaming book Mega Drive Encyclopedia gave an overall negative retrospective outlook to the Mega Drive version for its slow pacing, the character's short attack range, graphics and drastically different characteristics compared to the original release, but the music was positively commended. Derboo of Hardcore Gaming 101 opined that "Valis on the Genesis isn't a bad game, definitely leagues above the original, but still not particularly enjoyable. It's just so slow and boring."

=== PC Engine ===
Reception (PC Engine Super CD-ROM²)

Review scores
Publication	Score
Consoles +	81%
Famitsu	6/10, 6/10, 7/10, 4/10
Gekkan PC Engine	85/100, 90/100, 75/100, 75/100, 80/100
Génération 4	78%
Joypad	77%
Joystick	83%
Marukatsu PC Engine	7/10, 7/10, 8/10, 4/10

The PC Engine Super CD-ROM² remake of Valis: The Fantasm Soldier received more favorable response from reviewers. It ranked at the number 119 spot with a 22.82 out of 30 score in a public poll taken by PC Engine Fan as well. Jacques Harbonn of Consoles + commended the presentation for its animated cutscenes, graphics, Yuko's animations and soundtrack, but criticized the lack of additional gameplay options, underdeveloped backgrounds, and issues with the jumping mechanic for interfering with combat. Génération 4's Philippe Querleux praised the visuals and soundtrack but criticized Yuko's occasionally unresponsive controls and slow movement. Joystick's Jean-Marc Demoly and Joypad co-writer Jean-François Morisse gave positive remarks for its audiovisual presentation and controls.

In a retrospective outlook, GameFan's Eric L. Patterson found the PC Engine better over the Genesis version, citing its tight controls, enemy designs, varied backgrounds, and redbook audio. IGN's Lucas M. Thomas placed it as number six among his top ten list of TurboGrafx (Note: North American version of the PC Engine) titles not released on the Virtual Console. Retro Gamer's Rory Milne highlighted it as "arguably the best" entry in the series. Derboo from Hardcore Gaming 101 regarded it as the most well-executed game in the series, however he wrote that "It's still a bit too derivative and pedestrian to be counted among the genre greats like Castlevania and Ninja Gaiden, but at least very, very high second tier."

== Legacy ==
Valis: The Fantasm Soldier spawned a series of three sequels released during the fourth generation of video game consoles: Valis II (1989), Valis III (1990), and Valis IV (1991). In addition to the main games, an eroge visual novel spin-off titled Valis X was developed by Eants and released in 2006 on the 20th anniversary of the series, being the last game published by Telenet Japan. It is divided into five episodes that retell the stories of the first four titles, containing copious amounts of lesbian acts and tentacle erotica. Outside of video games, a four-volume Valis manga series by the artist ZOL was published by Kill Time Communication and featured in the seinen manga magazine Comic Valkyrie between 2007 and 2012. In 2023, an homage to the series titled Violet Wisteria was developed by KaniPro Games and released for Windows (via Steam), followed by versions for Nintendo Switch, PlayStation 4, PlayStation 5, Xbox One, and Xbox Series X and Series S published by Eastasiasoft in 2024.
