= Valis III =

1990 video game

- PC Engine CD-ROM² cover art
- Developer: Laser Soft (Note: Ported to Sega Genesis by Telenet Japan)
- Publishers: TurboGrafx-CD: JP: Telenet Japan; NA: NEC; Genesis: JP: Renovation Game; NA: Renovation Products
- Director: Masami Hanari
- Producer: Fumiyuki Moriyama
- Artist: Osamu Nabeshima
- Series: Valis
- Platforms: TurboGrafx-CD; Sega Genesis
- Release: TurboGrafx-CD: JP: September 7, 1990; NA: March 1992; Genesis: JP: March 22, 1991; NA: June 1991
- Genres: Action, platform
- Mode: Single-player

Valis III (Note: ヴァリスIII, Varisu Surī) is a 1990 action-platform video game originally developed by Laser Soft, published by Telenet Japan and NEC for the TurboGrafx-CD. A Sega Genesis version was released in 1991. It is the third entry in the Valis series. It stars Yuko Asou, a Japanese teenage schoolgirl chosen as the Valis warrior and wielder of the mystical Valis sword after the events of Valis II. King Glames, wielder of the sword Leethus, leads denizens of the dark world to conquer both Vecanti and Earth, seeking refuge for his people amid the destruction of their planet. Together with the demon warrior-maiden Cham and her sister Valna, Yuko must prevent Glames from destroying both worlds. Through the journey, the player explores and searches for items and power-ups while fighting enemies and defeating bosses.

Valis III was created by most of the same staff members who worked on the previous entry at Laser Soft, an internal gaming division of Telenet. Masami Hanari and Fumiyuki Moriyama reprised their roles as director and producer, respectively. The TurboGrafx-CD version features animated cutscenes, similar to those initially introduced in Valis II. The Genesis port was slated for a European release by Ubi Soft as part of a multi-game licensing deal with Telenet's North American subsidiary Renovation Products, but it was never officially released in the region. Both versions of the game have since been re-released through download services for other platforms and compilations. The TurboGrafx-CD version garnered generally favorable reviews from critics, while the Genesis version carried similar reception as the original release. It was followed by Valis IV (1991).

== Gameplay ==
Gameplay screenshot of the original TurboGrafx-CD version

Like its predecessors, Valis III is an action-platform game starring Yuko Asou, wielder of the mystical Valis sword, and is set after the events of Valis II. Together with her two allies, Valna and Cham, Yuko must prevent the Dark World's king, Glames, who is wielding the sword Leethus, from destroying Vecanti and Earth, . The player controls Yuko through two-dimensional levels, battling enemies, jumping from ledge to ledge, and running until the player faces a boss at the end of each level. At certain points in the game, gameplay pauses, and a cinematic cutscene plays regarding the game's storyline.

The main difference between Valis III and previous games in the Valis series is that the player is now in control of multiple characters that can be switched at any time (reminiscent of Zillion (1987) and Castlevania III: Dracula's Curse). Each character uses different upgradable weapons (Yuko has a chargeable energy wave, Cham has a whip, and Valna shoots magical blasts from her wand) and spells (of lightning, fire, and ice variety). The characters cannot be switched during boss fights, where the choice of the character also results in a different cutscene. Some stages also force the player to play as a particular character, usually the main heroine Yuko. Another feature new to the series is a ground slide move which can double as an attack. The Sega Genesis port had most of the cinematic cutscenes removed. Several levels were removed as well, and a new one was added to this version, while the remaining levels are more similar to each other. However, boss fights and parallax scrolling were improved.

== Plot ==
=== Story ===
King Glames (Note: ぐらめす (Guramesu), Ramses in the North American localization for the TurboGrafx-CD version.) leads denizens of the Dark World to conquer both Vecanti and Earth, seeking a home for his people before the destruction of his planet. Against this common foe, Yuko Asou fights together with Cham and Valna. Furthermore, the mystical Valis sword wielded by Yuko Asou is shown to be capable of more than what Yuko has accomplished with it thus far. During the course of the game, Yuko rescues Cham from kidnapped and Valna from captivity. Later, they visit the ruler of Vecanti, Nizetti, (Note: にぜち (Nizeti)) and unleashes the Valis blade's full potential, which culminates in a climactic battle between the three girls and Glames as well the returning antagonist from the first game, Rogles. (Note: ログレス (Roguresu)) Yuko defeats them both, and for her dutiful and unwavering service, she is permitted to step down from being a guardian and become a goddess in Vecanti, leaving Earth behind forever. The Valis sword retires to the heavens, and Vecanti prepares itself for prosperity, while Cham and Valna wave goodbye to Yuko as she departs to take on her new role.

=== Characters ===
Yuko Asou (Note: 麻生 優子 (Asou Yūko)) is the main character of the Valis series, a Japanese teenage schoolgirl chosen as the Valis warrior and keeper of the Valis sword. Of the three playable characters, she is the one with the most fighting strength, but is little weak in her magical abilities. Cham (Note: ちゃむ (Chamu)) is the game's second character, a demon warrior-maiden born in the Dark World who wields a deadly whip. Her father, Lada, a baron of the Dark World, was killed by Glames for standing against the plan to invade Dreamland. Faced with this fact, she seeks revenge and initially tries to steal the Valis sword from Yuko. However, Cham and Yuko decide to fight together. Valna (Note: ヴァルナ (Varuna)) is Yuko's sister who grew up within Vecanti and the game's third character. She became strong in the ways of magic and carries with her a powerful magic staff. Valna has the most powerful magic of the three character, but it is the one with the least attack strength.

== Development and release ==
Valis III was developed by Laser Soft, an internal gaming division of Telenet, previously responsible for Valis II (1989). It was created by most of the same staff members who worked on the previous entry, with both Masami Hanari and Fumiyuki Moriyama reprising their roles as director and producer respectively, while animator Osamu Nabeshima returned as one of the game's artists. Because of being released on CD-ROM, the team was able to include animated cutscenes into the game as they had done before with Valis II.

Valis III was first released for the PC Engine CD-ROM² (the Japanese iteration of the TurboGrafx-CD) by Telenet on September 7, 1990. The game was shown off at the 1991 Summer Consumer Electronics Show and originally slated for a January 1992 launch in North America, before being eventually published by NEC in March 1992 for the TurboGrafx-CD. The game was then ported to the Sega Genesis, published by Renovation Game (Reno) in Japan on March 22, 1991. Telenet also released the Genesis version through its subsidiary Renovation Products in North America in June 1991. A European release was planned by Ubi Soft, as part of a multi-game licensing deal with Renovation, but it was never officially released in the region for unknown reasons. The Genesis conversion was co-programmed by Yoshiki "UAI" Yamauchi and Masayasu Yamamoto, who had prior involvement with the series since Valis: The Fantasm Soldier. Michiko Naruke, best known for her work on the Wild Arms series, was involved in the Genesis adaptation as one of three composers under late sound director Shinobu Ogawa. A new stage was introduced for the port, but most of the cutscenes and multiple stages were removed due to cartridge size limitations.

A special visual compendium CD-ROM released in 1993 for the PC Engine, Valis Visual Collection, features the cutscenes from the game along with those of Valis II and its follow-up Valis IV. Valis III was included as part of the Valis: The Fantasm Soldier Complete compilation for Microsoft Windows, published by Bothtec in 2004 under a limited run of 2000 copies, which came bundled with a bonus CD and a figure. In 2011, D4 Enterprise re-released the compilation again with SD Valis and Super Valis as Valis: The Fantasm Soldier Complete Plus, which came bundled with a CD soundtrack instead. In 2021, the media company Edia announced a reprint of the PC Engine version to commemorate the series' 35th anniversary. The PC Engine version was included in the Valis: The Fantasm Soldier Collection compilation for the Nintendo Switch in Japan by Edia on December 9, 2021. The physical edition of the collection is also planned for a western release by Limited Run Games. It was re-released separately through the Nintendo eShop by Edia first in Japan on February 10, 2022, and later in Europe and North America in March 2022. The Genesis port was included as part of the Renovation Collection 1 compilation for Evercade, launched in 2022 by Blaze Entertainment. In 2023, the Genesis version was included as part of Valis: The Fantasm Soldier Collection III for Switch.

== Reception ==
Reception

Review scores
Publication	Score	
Publication	Sega Genesis	TurboGrafx-16
Aktueller Software Markt	N/A	8/12
Electronic Gaming Monthly	8/10, 8/10, 7/10, 8/10	8/10, 8/10, 7/10, 8/10
Famitsu	5/10, 6/10, 7/10, 5/10	5/10, 6/10, 7/10, 4/10
Games-X	90%	N/A
IGN	7.5/10	N/A
Joystick	80%	94%
Raze	85%	N/A
Tilt	14/20	N/A
Console XS	78/100	N/A
Mega Drive Advanced Gaming	48%	N/A
Sega Power	4/5	N/A
Sega Pro	79/100	N/A
TurboPlay	N/A	8/10

Valis III on the TurboGrafx-CD garnered generally favorable reviews from critics, some of which reviewed it as an import title. Readers of PC Engine Fan voted to give the game a 24.02 out of 30 score, ranking at the number 30 spot in a 1992 public poll. According to programmer Masayasu Yamamoto in a 2007 interview, the PC Engine version sold better compared to the Sega Mega Drive release.

Joystick's Jean-Marc Demoly applauded the title's gameplay and audiovisual improvements compared to Valis II. Aktueller Software Markt's Sandra Alter also commended the graphics, sound and gameplay, but criticized its animated cutscenes between stages for their length. Electronic Gaming Monthly's four reviewers felt that the TurboGrafx-CD version was superior, but they disliked its overall audio design and low difficulty. TurboPlay's Donn Nauert stated that the game's multiple characters offered enough challenge for players. Hardcore Gaming 101's Kurt Kalata wrote that "At the time of its release, Valis III was by far the most versatile, fun and best-looking game in the series."

The Sega Genesis version of Valis III carried similar reception as the original TurboGrafx-CD release, most of which also reviewed it as an import title. Readers of the Japanese Sega Saturn Magazine voted to give the title a 6.029 out of 10 score, ranking among Mega Drive games at the number 396 spot in a 1995 public poll. The four reviewers at EGM stated that it "has all of the qualities of a good game; cool graphics, control, music, and cinema displays." Games-X highlighted its cinematic cutscenes and sliding technique. GamePro's Doctor Dave praised the conversion for its visuals, sound, gameplay, fun factor, and challenge. Raze compared the title with Strider but praised its attention to detail, depth, and visuals.

Tilt's Jacques Harbonn criticized the port for its repetitive action. Sega Power's Steve Jarratt lauded its music for being "astounding". Sega Pro's Damian Butt opined that it "lacks the edge-of-the-seat gameplay that made El Viento such a winner". Console XS felt the game was monotonous. Mega Drive Advanced Gaming noted the overall presentation but found it occasionally difficult. Kalata of Hardcore Gaming 101 commended the Genesis release for its improved boss encounters. Complex selected it as the 61st best game on the Sega Genesis in a list originally published in 2016.
