= Valis IV =

1991 video game

- PC Engine CD-ROM² cover art
- Developer: Laser Soft
- Publishers: Telenet Japan; Super NES: JP: Telenet Japan; NA: Atlus Software
- Director: Mitsuo Nakamura
- Producer: Masami Hanari
- Designers: Chiyo Raya; Haruyuki Nishida
- Programmer: Hiroshi Ono
- Artist: Osamu Nabeshima
- Writers: Bunzō Matsui; Haruyuki Nishida
- Composers: Junta; Kawame; Shingo Murakami
- Series: Valis
- Platforms: PC Engine CD-ROM²; Super NES
- Release: PC Engine CD-ROM²: JP: August 23, 1991; Super NES: JP: March 27, 1992; NA: February 1993
- Genres: Action, platform
- Mode: Single-player

Valis IV (Note: ヴァリスIV, Varisu Fō) is a 1991 action-platform video game originally developed by Laser Soft and published by Telenet Japan for the PC Engine CD-ROM². A vastly different version titled Super Valis IV (Note: スーパーヴァリス 赤き月の乙女, Sūpā Varisu: Akaki Tsuki no Otome; lit. Super Valis: Red Moon Rising Maiden) was published in Japan by Telenet in 1992 and in North America by Atlus Software in 1993 for the Super Nintendo Entertainment System. It is the fourth and final main entry in the eponymous series. Following on the events of Valis III, Yuko became a goddess and has watched over Vecanti since Glames' defeat. The dark world prince Galgear, who lost self-control after acquiring a magical ring, broke from his fifteen-year imprisonment by the gods of Vecanti, kidnapping Valna and being pursued by troops led by Cham. Lena, a member of Cham's band, is joined by her sister Amu and the prince's father Asfal on a journey to retrieve the titular sword and defeat Galgear.

Valis IV was created by most of the same staff members who worked on previous entries in the series at Laser Soft, an internal gaming division of Telenet. The PC Engine CD-ROM² version garnered generally favorable reviews from critics, most of which reviewed it as an import title, while the Super Nintendo adaptation was met with mixed response. The original PC Engine version never received a western localization, but both versions have since been re-released through digital services for other platforms and compilations. The SNES version was later added to the Nintendo Classics service on December 18, 2020.

== Gameplay ==
Gameplay screenshot of the original PC Engine CD-ROM² version

In line with previous entries in the series, Valis IV is a side-scrolling action platform game starring Lena, a young Vecanti woman set to become the next Valis warrior, taking place after the events of Valis III. Together with her sister Amu and the dark world king Asfal, Lena must retrieve the Valis sword to defeat prince Galgear, the king's son. The player controls Lena through nine two-dimensional levels, battling enemies, jumping from ledge to ledge, and running until the player faces a boss at the end of each level. As in the previous entries, gameplay pauses and a cinematic cutscene plays at certain points regarding the game's storyline.

Valis IV retains the same gameplay format as Valis III, in which the player is now in control of multiple characters that can be switched at any time. However, the characters cannot be switched during boss fights. Each character wields a unique weapon and have access to their own elemental spell, which can be enhanced up to three levels and are charged via a "weapon power" meter. The characters also possess their own special ability: Lena can slide, Amu can perform double-jumps, and Asfal is invincible against certain stage hazards. By exploring and searching across each level, the player can acquire items and power-ups to increase the characters' maximum health and magic attributes.

== Plot ==
The original PC Engine CD-ROM² version follows on the events of Valis III. Yuko has become the goddess of the world of Vecanti and has watched over the world in peace since the defeat of Glames. Trouble brews when the Dark World prince named Galgear (Note: ガルギア (Garugia)) begins to search for a magical ring. This ring increases his powers, but to the loss of control he could have maintained under its effects, and the gods of Vecanti recognize this and imprison Galgear inside a crystal sunk into the ocean.

Fifteen years pass, and Galgear manages to break out of his prison, kidnapping the former heroine Valna and being pursued by troops led by Cham as a result. A member of her band, named Lena, (Note: レナ (Rena)) requests permission to infiltrate Galgear's stronghold and free Valna on her own; Cham initially disagrees, but a disembodied voice convinces her to allow this, and Lena brings her twin sister Amu (Note: アム (Amu)) with her. They both succeed in reaching Galgear's inner sanctum, but are stopped by the prince and his ring, who is about to obliterate them when they are teleported away by a magic force — that of Asfal, (Note: アスファー (Asufaru)) the prince's father, who tells them that only the Valis sword, no longer in this world, can stop him. Both girls journey day and night to reach the heavens of Vecanti and claim the sword, which is bequeathed onto them by Yuko herself, sent with her blessings in stopping the power-hungry prince. They return to Vecanti and use the mystic blade to defeat Galgear.

== Development and release ==
Valis IV was developed by Laser Soft, an internal gaming division of Telenet, previously responsible for Valis III (1990). It was created by most of the same staff members who worked on previous entries in the Valis series, with both Mitsuo Nakamura and Masami Hanari being director and producer respectively. Haruyuki Nishida, who was also responsible as designer with assistance from Chiyo Rara, co-wrote the scenario along with Bunzō Matsui. Hiroshi Ono acted as programmer, while animator Osamu Nabeshima returned as one of the game's artists. The soundtrack was co-composed by Shingo Murakami and members under the pseudonyms "Junta" and "Kawame".

Castle Vanity, a new act introduced in Super Valis IV for the SNES

Valis IV was originally released for the PC Engine CD-ROM² in Japan by Telenet on August 23, 1991. It never received a western localization. A compilation titled Valis Visual Collection was released in 1993 by Telenet for the PC Engine CD-ROM, featuring visual scenes from the game. The title was included as part of the Valis: The Fantasm Soldier Complete compilation for Microsoft Windows, published by Sunsoft in 2004 under a limited run of 2000 copies, which came bundled with a bonus CD and a figure. The original PC Engine CD version was re-released in digital form for Windows through D4 Enterprise's Project EGG service on August 21, 2007. In 2011, D4 Enterprise re-released the compilation with additional titles as Valis: The Fantasm Soldier Complete Plus, which came bundled with a CD soundtrack instead. The PC Engine original was included as part of Valis: The Fantasm Soldier Collection II for Nintendo Switch.

=== Super Valis IV ===
A vastly different version for the Super Nintendo Entertainment System, titled Super Valis IV (known in Japan as Super Valis), was first published in Japan by Telenet on March 27, 1992, and later in North America by Atlus Software in February 1993. In December 2020, it was added to the Nintendo Classics service. In 2023, Super Valis IV was included as part of Valis: The Fantasm Soldier Collection III for Switch. Hal Nishida was responsible for rearranging the game under direction of Masami Hanari. Extensive changes were made to Valis IV when it was adapted to the Super NES: Two of the three playable characters from the original (Amu and Asfal) were replaced with Yuko (which could be played via a cheat code), the magic system was replaced by special items and weapons, and the animated sequences from the original version also were removed. Though several levels were removed, a new level was designed for this version.

== Reception ==
Reception

Review scores
Publication	Score
Consoles +	87%
Famitsu	7/10, 7/10, 7/10, 4/10
Génération 4	90%
Joypad	92%
Joystick	90%
Hippon Super!	6/10
Super Gaming	24/30

Valis IV on the PC Engine CD-ROM² garnered generally favorable reviews from critics, most of which reviewed it as an import title. Famitsu's four reviewers gave it an overall mixed outlook. Génération 4's Frank Ladoire praised its visuals, character animations, CD-quality soundtrack and playability. Likewise, Joystick's Jean-Marc Demoly and Joypad's Alain Huyghues-Lacour commended the game for its graphics, animations, music and controls, but noted the prolonged loading times.

Consoles +' Robinton and Damon gave the title positive remarks for its audiovisual presentation, responsive controls and longevity. Super Gaming's three reviewers praised the music, graphics, improved cinematics and expanded depth. Nevertheless, while Mike regarded it as a good addition to the Valis series, both Ken and Samrye commented that it "loses a little in the plot dimension" and felt similar to previous entries. Hardcore Gaming 101's Kurt Kalata wrote that "as a whole, Valis IV is not quite as good as its immediate predecessor, but still one of the better games in the series."

=== SNES ===
Reception (SNES)

Review scores
Publication	Score
Consoles +	72%
Electronic Gaming Monthly	7/10, 7/10, 7/10, 7/10
Famitsu	20/40
GameFan	139/200
Joypad	81%
Joystick	84%
Mega Fun	44/100
Total!	3
Video Games (DE)	38%
Play Time	67%
SNES Force	60%
The Super Famicom	65/100
Super Pro	35/100

Super Valis IV on the Super Nintendo Entertainment System received mixed reception from critics, most of which reviewed it as an import title, compared to the original PC Engine CD-ROM² release. Consoles +' François Hermellin and Kaneda Kun commended the game's graphical presentation of most stages and classic-style playability, finding it "neither excessively difficult nor particularly innovative." However, both stated that its music did not make good use of the system's sound chip. Famitsu's gave it an overall mixed outlook. In contrast, Joystick's Demoly praised the adaptation for its visuals, controls, audio and character animations. Joypad's Alain Huyghues-Lacour and Olivier Prézeau echoed similar thoughts as Demoly, but both noted that the title was structurally different compared to the PC Engine CD-ROM version. Electronic Gaming Monthly's four reviewers wrote that it played faster compared to other titles in the genre. They commended the audiovisual presentation and variety of weapons, but criticized its slow action during early levels and low difficulty. GameFan's Dave Halverson and Brody shared similar opinions but disagreed about its difficulty and playability.

Mega Fun's Philipp Noak and Bastian Lorz faulted its simplistic visuals, low number of enemies on-screen, and audio but noted its animations in a positive light. Super Pro's David Westley highlighted the game's colorful and imaginative backgrounds, high quality cutscenes and adequate audio, but panned its bosses for their slow animations and monotonous gameplay. Video Games' Julian Eggebrecht labeled its visuals and audio as "catastrophic" for Super Nintendo standards, and criticized its level design and uninteresting enemies. Play Time expressed that "decent sound and a mixed graphic aren't everything", negatively noting the low number of enemies present on a level. SNES Force found its gameplay to be "unchallenging". Total!'s Maris Feldmann stated that the title was highly difficult due to "nasty jumps and tough intermediate opponents." Hardcore Gaming 101's Kalata opined that Super Valis IV is "just kind of bland and boring, and very disappointing in comparison to the CD-ROM powered version."
