= Valis (video game series) =

Platform video game series

- Logo used in Japanese releases
- Genres: Platform, visual novel
- Developers: Telenet Japan, Wolf Team, I.S.C
- Publishers: Japan; Telenet Japan, Bandai, Tokuma Shoten, Riot, Laser Soft, Sega, Razorsoft; North America; Renovation Products, NEC, Turbo Technologies Inc., Atlus
- Platform: Various home console systems
- First release: Valis: The Fantasm Soldier; 1986
- Latest release: Valis: The Fantasm Soldier Collection III; January 18, 2024

Valis (Note: ヴァリス, Varisu) is a platform game series created by Telenet Japan. A magical girl plot, the games tell the story of a Japanese schoolgirl who is fated to protect three realms by wielding a mystical sword known as Valis.

The original game, Valis: The Fantasm Soldier (1986), was developed for the PC-88 and ported to several other platforms. This was followed by a series of platform games released during the 16-bit era for various home consoles, most notably the TurboGrafx-16 and Sega Mega Drive. Outside the original series, an erotic visual novel was released in 2006, followed by compilations of the original games.

After Telenet Japan shut down in 2007, Sunsoft acquired the rights to the series. These rights were passed on to Japanese media company Edia in December 2019.

== Games ==
All Valis games are platform games except Valis X, an erotic visual novel released for Windows in 2006 on the 20th anniversary of the series. Developed by Eants, it was the last game published by Telenet Japan. Valis X is divided into five episodes that retell the stories of the first four games, containing copious amounts of lesbian acts and tentacle erotica.

In June 2021, on the 35th anniversary of the Valis series, Edia announced a crowdfunding campaign to bring ports of the Valis games to the Nintendo Switch.

After the crowdfunding period, Edia ported several games from the Valis series to the Switch through collections. The first collection, Valis: The Fantasm Soldier Collection, was released in December 2021 in Japan and in March 2022 in Western territories. In March 2022, Edia also announced the launch of a second collection of Valis that will feature Valis IV (PC Engine), Syd of Valis (Genesis / Mega Drive) and Valis: The Fantasm Soldier (Genesis / Mega Drive and MSX). In December 2023, the third collection was launched in Japan.

=== Original games ===
Year	Title	Original platform	Notes
1986	Valis: The Fantasm Soldier	PC-8801	
1989	Valis II	PC Engine CD-ROM²/TurboGrafx-CD	
1990	Valis III	PC Engine CD-ROM²/TurboGrafx-CD	
1991	Valis IV	PC Engine CD-ROM²/TurboGrafx-CD	
1992	Super Valis IV	Super Famicom/Super NES	Despite a similar name, it is significantly different from Valis IV
1992	Syd of Valis (SD Valis)	Sega Mega Drive/Genesis	Super deformed remake of Valis II
2006	Valis X	Windows	Erotic visual novel

=== Compilations ===
Year	Title	Platform	Games included
2006	Valis Complete	Windows	The four original games. Plus version includes Syd of Valis and Super Valis IV.
2011	Valis Complete Plus	Windows	The four original games. Plus version includes Syd of Valis and Super Valis IV.
2021	Valis: The Fantasm Soldier Collection	Windows, Nintendo Switch	The TurboGrafx-CD versions of the first three games: Valis I, Valis II and Valis III.
2022	Valis: The Fantasm Soldier Collection II	Nintendo Switch	Syd of Valis (Genesis); Valis: The Fantasm Soldier (Genesis and MSX); Valis IV (TurboGrafx-CD)
2023	Valis: The Fantasm Soldier Collection III	Nintendo Switch	Super Valis IV (SNES); Valis: The Fantasm Soldier (PC-8801 and NES); Valis II (MSX2); Valis III (Genesis)

== Manga ==
A four-volume Valis manga series by the artist ZOL was published by Kill Time Communication and featured in the seinen manga magazine Comic Valkyrie in 2007-2012. The first game had been separately adapted into a manga in 1999.
