= Canard PC =

French video game magazine

- Editor: Julie Le Baron
- Categories: PC gaming magazine
- Frequency: Monthly
- Publisher: Presse Non-Stop
- First issue: November 2003
- Country: France
- Based in: Paris
- Language: French
- Website: canardpc.com
- ISSN: 1764-5107

Canard PC is an independent magazine founded in France in 2003 devoted to PC gaming and published monthly.

The title Canard PC is a paronym, derived from Canard WC, which is the French name for Toilet Duck.

Canard PC's independence from the game companies is recognized in the French video gaming circles. Canard PC has a sister magazine, Canard PC Hardware.

Independent studies have shown that Canard PC reviews many games not mentioned by other magazines or websites specialized in video games, and has a strong variation in its review scores. Canard PC Managing editor, Ivan Gaudé, recognized in a video games critics panel on a French network that they did not like scoring very much, but they felt they had to put them for their reviews because gamers wanted them.

== History ==
In July 2003, some editors left the publishing staff of the French gaming monthly Joystick after its acquisition by Future Publishing. They founded Canard PC in the following months. The magazine is edited by Presse Non-Stop, a company owned at 75% by the editors themselves, specifically created for Canard PC.
