= General Guidelines of the Mexican System of Classification Equivalencies for Video Game Content =

Mexican video game content rating system

- Formation: 27 May 2021; 5 years ago
- Founder: Dirección General de Radio, Televisión y Cinematografía

The Mexican System of Equivalences of Video Game Content Classification (SMECCV) (Sistema Mexicano de Equivalencias de Clasificación de Contenidos de Videojuegos) is the current legislation in Mexico in terms of the regulation of the age classification of video games. This legislation was adopted and published in the Official Journal of the Federation by the Secretariat of the Interior in November 2020 and entered into force on 27 May 2021.

== History ==
New Pokémon Snap was the first game to comply with the rating system.

Since the beginning of the commercialization of the video game industry in Mexico there was no regulation for its classification by age and on its restriction on the sale to minors in the case of video games with a high content of violence or sexual nature. Since the 1990s, manufacturers and distributors marketed in Mexico the titles that were sold in the United States being these already qualified by the ESRB of that country, resulting in the classifications given by this association being used de facto in Mexico even though they were printed in English on the packaging of the games which began to be translated around 2012.

Given the growth of the video game industry in Mexico and within the framework of the war against drug trafficking, in April 2017 Aurora Cavazos Cavazos, a deputy for the Institutional Revolutionary Party, proposed a reform to the Federal Telecommunications and Broadcasting Law for the Federal Telecommunications Institute (IFT) to regulate the classification and sale of video games to minors in Mexico, being Turn to the Senate that finally approved on 17 April of that year that was the Secretariat of the Interior in charge of classifying by age and regulating the sale of video games in Mexico after the Organic laws of the Federal and General Public Administration of the Rights of Children and Adolescents were reformed.

The aforementioned reforms suggested that it would be the Ministry of the Interior that would issue the guidelines for the classification and regulation of the sale of video games in national territory, which were not published until November 2020 and entered into force on 27 May 2021. In accordance with what was published in said guidelines, the Ministry of the Interior established that it would be the responsibility of the General Directorate of Radio, Television and Film to classify the titles and monitor compliance with the standard. The first video game to comply with this regulation was New Pokémon Snap for the Nintendo Switch.

== Classifications ==
Classification	Name	Description	Appropriate age
	All public	The content is suitable for all ages. It may contain a minimal amount of caricature, fantasy or light violence, or infrequent use of moderate foul language.	All ages.
	+12 years old	The content is suitable for people 12 years of age or older. It may contain more cartoon, fantasy or light violence, more suggestive topics, minimal vulgar humor, moderate foul language, minimal references to alcohol or tobacco, animated blood, minimal simulated bets or minimally provocative insinuating topics.	All ages from 12 years old.
	+15 years old	The content is suitable for people 15 years of age or older. They may contain moderate violence, insinuating topics, too suggestive topics, vulgar humor, minimal amount of blood, simulated bets, references to tobacco and alcohol or moderate use of strong language.	Teenagers from 15 years old.
	Adults +18 years old	The content is suitable for people over 18 years of age. Requires age verification for purchase. They may contain intense or extreme violence, bloodshed, moderate graphic sexual content, frequent use of tobacco and alcohol, bets with real currency or strong language.	Young people and adults over 18 years of age.
	Exclusive to adults	The content is only suitable for adults. It is very similar to the previous one, but they may include more prolonged scenes of intense violence, intense graphic sexual content, continuous use of tobacco or alcohol, intense bloodshed or bets with real currency.	Adults only.
