= Easybits =

Norwegian privately held educational software company

- Company type: Private
- Industry: Parenting, E-learning
- Products: Magic Desktop, Inspirus platform, GameXN, Kiddo Smart
- Services: Educational software

Easybits AS is a Norwegian privately held educational software company. Its principal product is Magic Desktop, an educational and parental control software suite. Easybits partnered with Skype, powering Skype's games channel in 2006 and Intel for building the first version of Classmate PC.

== History ==
The company initially announced a line of parental control software in 2003. Its goal was to offer a safe and educational environment for children. The company’s principal product Magic Desktop won European Union’s benchmarking study of tools for parental control award in 2006 and 2007 for children. Deloitte described the product as "very well suited for children because it offers a safe and educational environment”. Easybits landed distribution and licensing deals with the internet service providers in Europe including Tiscali, T-Online, Telenor, Telecom Italia, Belgacom, UPC, TalkTalk and a few others.

In 2004, Easybits Software partnered with Telenor to introduce e-mail solutions for children. In 2009, Disney and Asus teamed up to work on a new product Disney Netpal, they asked EasyBits to ascertain what makes the User Interface differentiation and provide parental controls.
