= Region lock =

Type of digital rights management

A region lock (or region coding) is a class of digital rights management preventing the use of a certain product or service, such as multimedia or a hardware device, outside a certain region or territory. A regional lockout may be enforced through physical means, through technological means such as detecting the user's IP address or using an identifying code, or through unintentional means introduced by devices only supporting certain regional technologies (such as video formats, i.e., NTSC and PAL).

A regional lock may be enforced for several reasons, such as to stagger the release of a certain product, to avoid losing sales to the product's foreign publisher, to maximize the product's impact in a certain region through localization, to hinder grey market imports by enforcing price discrimination, or to prevent users from accessing certain content in their territory because of legal reasons (either due to censorship laws, or because a distributor does not have the rights to certain intellectual property outside their specified region).

== Multimedia ==
=== Disc regions ===
The DVD, Blu-ray Disc, and UMD media formats all support the use of region coding; DVDs use eight region codes (Region 7 is reserved for future use; Region 8 is used for "international venues", such as airplanes and cruise ships), and Blu-ray Discs use three region codes corresponding to different areas of the world. Most Blu-rays, however, are region-free. Ultra HD Blu-ray discs are also region-free.

On computers, the DVD region can usually be changed five times. Windows uses three region counters: its own, that of the DVD drive, and that of the player software (occasionally, the player software has no region counter of its own, but uses that of Windows). After the fifth region change, the system is locked to that region. In modern DVD drives (type RPC-2), the region lock is saved to its hardware, so that even reinstalling Windows or using the drive with a different computer will not unlock the drive again.

Unlike DVD regions, Blu-ray regions are verified only by the player software, not by the computer system or the drive. The region code is stored in a file or the registry, and there are hacks to reset the region counter of the player software. In stand-alone players, the region code is part of the firmware.

For bypassing region codes, there are software and multi-regional players available.

A new form of Blu-ray region coding tests not only the region of the player/player software, but also its country code, repurposing a user setting intended for localization (PSR19) as a new form of regional lockout. This means, for example, while both the U.S. and Japan are Region A, some American discs will not play on devices/software configured for Japan or vice versa, since the two countries have different country codes. (For example, the United States is "US" (21843 or hex 0x5553), Japan is "JP" (19024 or hex 0x4a50), and Canada is "CA" (17217 or hex 0x4341).) Although there are only three Blu-ray regions, the country code allows much more precise control of the regional distribution of Blu-ray Discs than the six (or eight) DVD regions.

Since Blu-ray discs are cheaper in America than in Japan, American releases of Japanese anime series are often protected in that way to prevent reversal importations. Some discs check whether the country code is U.S. or Canada (sometimes also Mexico) and play only in these countries, others allow all country codes (even those of non–Region-A countries), except the Japanese.

AnyDVD HD (7.5.9.0 and higher) has an option to enforce the U.S. country code. The software developers say users can also change the country code to enforce in the registry value "bdCountryCode" themselves or set "no country code" by using the value 4294967295 or hex 0xFFFFFFFF. (Before the change of the value, AnyDVD must be closed, and after changing, it must be restarted.)

Some stand-alone Blu-ray players and player programs allow to change the country code (e.g., via the parental lock) and can bypass this protection like that.

=== Software ===
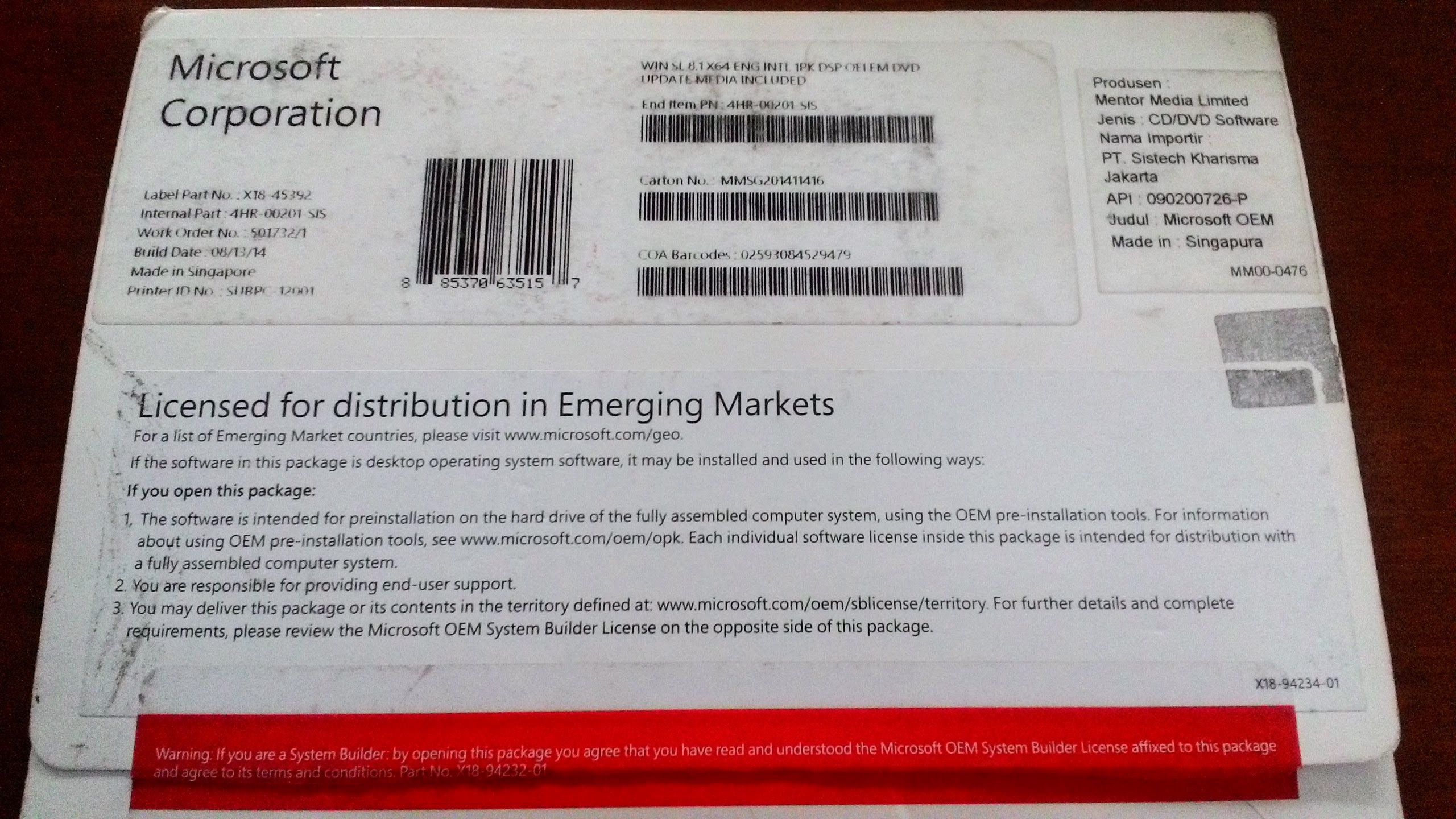
Emerging Markets licensed OEM installer for Windows 8.1 Single Language, such installer may only be used in territories designated as "emerging markets"

Some features of certain programs are/were disabled if the software is/was installed on a computer in a certain region.

In older versions of the copy software CloneCD, the features "Amplify Weak Sectors", "Protected PC Games," and "Hide CDR Media" were disabled in the United States and Japan. Changing the region and language settings in Windows (e.g., to Canadian English) or patches could unlock these features in the two countries. SlySoft left these options disabled for the U.S. for legal reasons, but no features were disabled in AnyDVD. The current version of CloneCD (5.3.1.4) is not region-restricted anymore.

The newer versions of the copy software DVDFab (9.1.5.0 and higher) come in a U.S. version (with no Blu-ray–ripping feature), which is downloaded if the homepage dvdfab.cn identifies a U.S. IP address, and a non-US version (with working Blu-ray–ripping feature). Some webpages allow the download of the non-U.S. version also from the U.S. (they store the non-U.S. version directly and do not use download links to the developer's homepage).

The software CCleaner v5.45.6611 has an added check to prevent the use in embargoed countries.

Some programs (e.g., games) are distributed in different versions for NTSC and PAL computers. In some cases, to avoid grey market imports or international software piracy, they are designed not to run on a computer with the wrong TV system. Other programs can run on computers with both TV systems.

Kaspersky Lab sells its anti-virus products at different prices in different regions and uses regionalized activation codes. A program bought in a country of a region can be activated in another country of the same region. Once activated, the software can also be used in and download updates from other regions as long as the license is valid. Problems may arise when the license must be renewed, or if the software must be reinstalled, in a region other than the one where it was bought. The region is identified by the IP address (there is no activation possible without Internet connection), so the use of VPN or a proxy is recommended to circumvent the restriction.

The Kaspersky regions are:

- Region 1: Canada, United States, Mexico, and Bermuda
- Region 2: Western Europe, the Middle East, South Africa, Egypt, and Japan
- Region 3: Southeast Asia
- Region 4: Central America, South America (excluding French Guiana), and Oceania; Mexico uses software that uses flags for both regions 1 and 4
- Region 5: Africa, India, and the Commonwealth of Independent States (also includes Czech Republic, Greece, Hungary, Poland, Romania, and Serbia)
- Region 6: Mainland China
- Region 7: Elsewhere
- Region 8: Special international area (airplane, steamer, etc.)

The desktop versions of HP Pavilion and Compaq Presario are region-locked, according the build is 91UKV6PRA1, for the A6740uk released in 2009. WildTangent EMEA, Magic Desktop will not work on models in the U.S.

The HP FlexBuild regions are:

- USA: United States
- JAP: Japan
- KOR: Korean
- EMEA: Middle East
- TOUCH: Designed for HP Touchsmart only

=== Websites ===
On the internet, geo-blocking is used primarily to control access to online media content that is only licensed for playback in a certain region due to territorial licensing arrangements.

== Video games ==
Regional lockouts in video games have been achieved by several methods, such as hardware/software authentication, slot pin-out change, differences in cartridge cases, IP blocking and online software patching. Most console video games have region encoding.

The main regions are:

- Japan and Asia (NTSC-J)
- Americas (NTSC-U)
- Europe, Oceania, Middle East, India, South Africa (PAL)
- China (NTSC-C)

=== Atari ===
The Atari 2600 does not have regional locking; however, NTSC games can display wrong colors, slow speed and sound on PAL systems, and vice versa.

The Atari 7800 has regional locking on NTSC systems, making PAL games unplayable on them. However, the PAL versions of the Atari 7800 can run NTSC games, but still suffering from the same problems the Atari 2600 had.

The Atari 5200, Lynx, and Jaguar are region-free.

=== Nintendo ===
Nintendo was the first console maker to introduce regional locks to its consoles, using them for every one of its home consoles until the Nintendo Switch. Nintendo has mostly abstained from using them for its handheld consoles.

Games for the Nintendo Entertainment System (NES) were locked through both physical and technical means; the design of cartridges for the NES differed between Japan and other markets, using a different number of pins. As the Famicom (the Japanese model) used slightly smaller cartridges, Japanese games could not fit into NES consoles without an adapter (and even with that, they could still not use the extra sound functionalities of the Famicom due to their differing hardware). Official adapters existed inside early copies of Gyromite; other Famicom games could be played by disassembling the cartridge and then swapping out the original board of the game with a different Famicom game's board.

Additionally, the NES also contained the 10NES authentication chip; the chip was coded for one of four regions:

- NTSC (North America)
- PAL-A (United Kingdom, Australia, and Italy)
- PAL-B (other European countries and South Korea)
- Asia (South East Asia, India, and Hong Kong)

A game's region is recognized by the console using the 10NES chip. If the chip inside the cartridge conflicts with the chip inside the console, the game will not boot. The 10NES chip also doubled as a form of digital rights management to prevent loading unlicensed or bootleg games. The redesigned Nintendo Entertainment System model released in 1993 lacks the 10NES chip, and can play PAL and unlicensed games, although Famicom games still need a converter. The Famicom does not include a 10NES chip, but is still unable to play imports unless an adapter is used, due to the different size of the media.

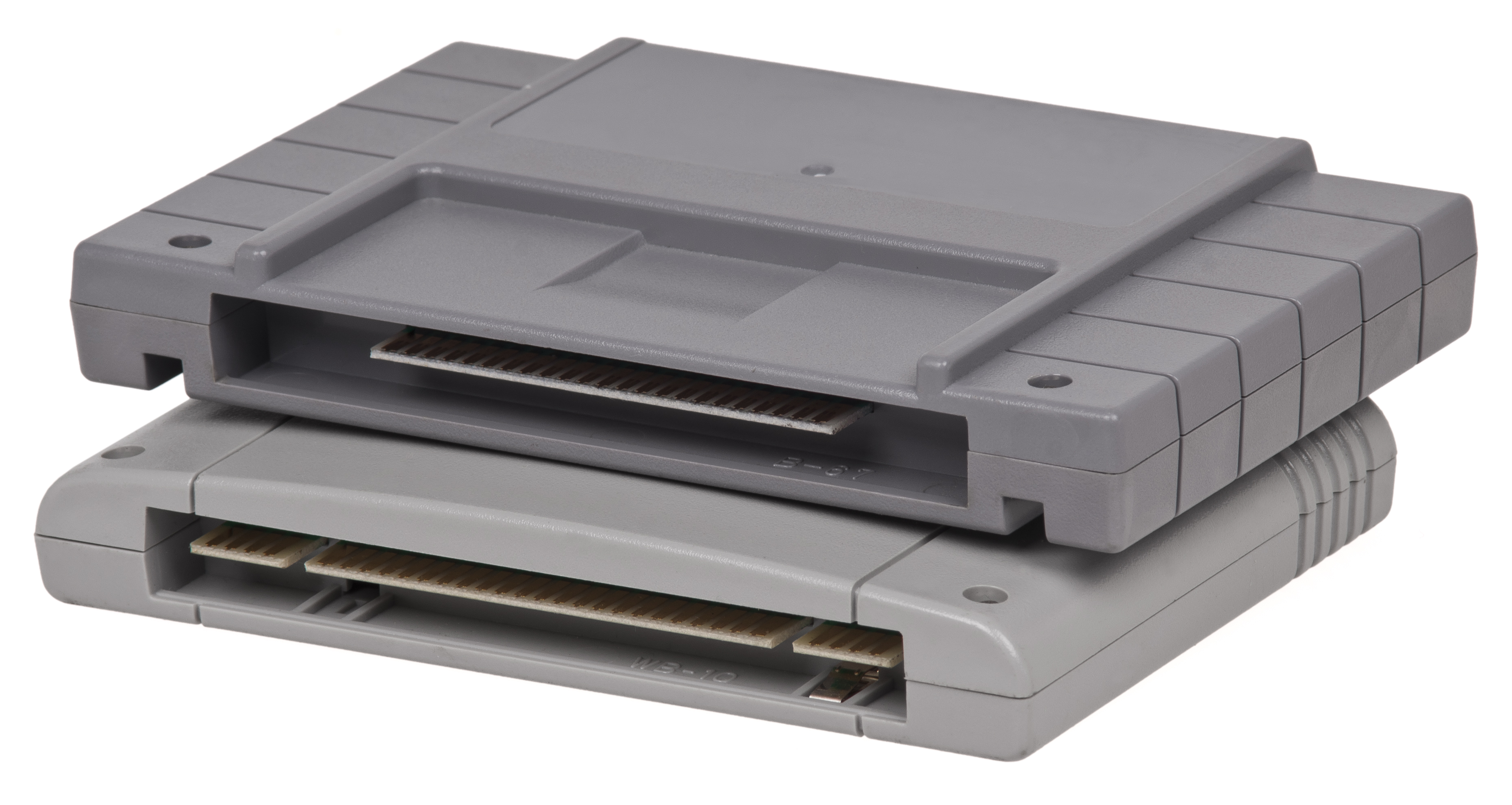
Cases for Super Famicom games in Japan and Super NES games in PAL regions (bottom), and Super NES games in North American (top) regions. Notice the slots in the top cartridge to accommodate for plastic tabs in the North American console.

The American Super Nintendo Entertainment System (Super NES) and the Super Famicom use differences in cartridge cases. A Super NES cartridge will not fit in a Super Famicom/PAL Super NES slot due to its different shape and two pieces of plastic in the Super NES slot prevent Super Famicom cartridges from being inserted in the Super NES. PAL Super NES carts can be fully inserted in Japanese consoles, but a similar chip to the 10NES, called the CIC, prevents PAL games from being played in NTSC consoles and vice versa. While physical modification of the cases (either console or cartridges) is needed to play games from the different regions, in order to play games of different TV systems, a hardware modification is also needed. Region locks could be bypassed using special unlicensed cartridge adapters such as Game Genie. The swapping of cartridge shells also bypasses the physical regional lockout.

The Nintendo 64 uses similar lockout methods to the Super NES.

Both the GameCube and Wii are region-locked, and the Wii Shop Channel is also region-locked as well. On the Wii, channels from other regions will refuse to load with the message "This channel can't be used." The coded regions are:

- NTSC-U (The Americas and Asia)
- PAL (Europe and Oceania)
- NTSC-J (Japan)
- NTSC-K (South Korea)

The GameCube and Wii's regional lockout can be bypassed either by console modification or simply by third-party software. Datel's FreeLoader or Action Replay discs are most notable.

The Wii U and its GamePad is also region-locked.

The Nintendo Switch is region-free, and therefore allows for games from any region to be played, whether through physical cartridges or digital downloads. For instance, games from the Nintendo eShop can be purchased and downloaded regardless of region. The only exception to this is the Chinese version of the Nintendo Switch distributed by Tencent in mainland China. This version of the console can still play cartridge-based games from any region; however, they can only connect to Chinese servers. Thus, it cannot access any game updates, DLC or online modes from games in other regions, or download said games digitally. Conversely, all other versions of the Nintendo Switch are unable to play cartridge-based games made by Tencent specifically for the Chinese Nintendo Switch.

Nintendo Switch regions (affects in-game measurement systems, language, region-specific content, save games, DLCs)
Region Code	Country	Notes
JPN	Japan	Japanese–based games and systems are usually released in JPN region first.
USA	The Americas (North/South America)	American–based games are usually released in USA region first, while Japanese–based games and systems are usually released in USA region second.
EUR	Europe	Games and systems usually launch in EUR region third.
AUS	Oceania (Australia/New Zealand)	Many games released in Australia/New Zealand actually share the same version as the EUR region. However, a minority of games released in Australia/New Zealand have a different version from the European release, due to censorship and content edits. Games from AUS region will work in European systems and vice versa.
ASI, CHT, KOR	Asia (China/Hong Kong/Taiwan/South Korea)	Applicable for Versions 8.0.0 and later. This region is less common in terms of number of titles, compared to JPN/USA/EUR. Similar to AUS region, games with ASI region have a different version due to censorship, content edits, or regional language differences. Before version 8.0.0, most Asian countries belonged to the Americas, similar to the Nintendo 3DS and Wii U.

The Nintendo Switch 2 is also region-free in regions outside of Japan, similar to the Nintendo Switch. However, a cheaper Japan-exclusive model has been released alongside the regular worldwide version for that region which prevents the use of non-Japanese accounts and is locked to the Japanese language only.

All Nintendo handheld consoles except both Nintendo DSi and Nintendo 3DS models are fully region-free. In the case of the former, only the physical and digital games that cannot be played on earlier DS models are region-locked. The latter's region lock strictly applies to all software designed for it, with the only exception being the application Nintendo 3DS Guide: Louvre, which is not a game in of itself but rather as an application that serves as a guide for visitors of the Louvre Museum. Like the Wii, the 3DS's regional lockout can be bypassed by third-party software or custom firmware such as Luma3DS.

=== Sony ===
The PlayStation and PlayStation 2 are region-locked into three regions: NTSC U/C, NTSC-J, and PAL. It is possible to disable region locking on said systems via a modchip or by performing a disk-swap when the console starts. In the case of the PlayStation 2, disk-swapping is achieved by using a special disc known as the Swap Magic, which can be used to bypass regional locks and allows imported games and game backups to be successfully run on the system. DVD movies on the PlayStation 2 are also region-locked.

All PlayStation 3 games except for Persona 4 Arena are region free. Although publishers could choose to region-lock specific games based on a mechanism that allows for the game to query the model of the PS3, none did so during the first three years after the PS3's launch. In the case of Persona 4 Arena; publisher Atlus declined to reverse its decision despite substantial outcry by some of their fanbase. The decision was made to avoid excessive importing, because all versions of the game share the same features and language support, but have differing price points and release dates in each region. They did, however, decide not to apply region‑locking to its sequel (Persona 4 Arena Ultimax). Region locking is present for backwards-compatible PlayStation and PlayStation 2 games, as well as DVD and Blu-ray movies. Additionally, some games separate online players per region, such as Metal Gear Solid 4: Guns of the Patriots.

The PlayStation Store only contains content for its own country. For example, the EU store will not supply usable map packs for an imported U.S. copy of Call of Duty 4: Modern Warfare. In addition, downloadable content for the PlayStation 3 systems is region-matched with the game itself. For example, DLC from the U.S. PlayStation Store must be used in conjunction with a U.S.–region game. More specifically, the PS3's file system includes region-of-origin, so DLC cannot be shared between different region games much like save files cannot. Also, the PSN Store is tied to each user's PSN account, and payment methods for PSN is also region-locked. For example, a user with a Japanese PSN account will only be able to access the Japanese PSN store despite owning a U.S. PS3, and can only pay for a game with a Japanese PSN gift card or Japanese credit card. However, with a few rare exceptions, notably Joysound Dive, downloaded content from each PSN store are also region free, as are PSOne and PS2 classics offered on the store.

PlayStation 3 / PlayStation 4 regions for physical discs & DLC
Region Code	Region	Country categorisation	Rating	SKU Title ID
R1	America (both North and South)	(categorised under SIEA: Argentina, Belize, Bolivia, Brazil, Canada, Chile, Colombia, Costa Rica, Dominican Republic, Ecuador, El Salvador, French Guiana, Guam, Guatemala, Guyana, Honduras, Mexico, Nicaragua, Panama, Paraguay, Peru, Puerto Rico, United States, Uruguay)	ESRB, SMECCV, DJCTQ	Number only CUSA + number
R2	Europe Australia / New Zealand (for titles that share the same version/compatibility as the Europe release) Japan (special R2, not compatible with Europe DLCs)	(categorised under SIEE: Australia, Austria, Bahrain, Belgium, Bulgaria, Croatia, Cyprus, Czech Republic, Denmark, Finland, France, Germany, Hungary, Iceland, India, Ireland, Israel, Italy, Kuwait, Lebanon, Luxembourg, Malta, New Zealand, Norway, Oman, Poland, Portugal, Qatar, Romania, Russia, Saudi Arabia, Slovak Republic, Slovenia, South Africa, Spain, Sweden, Switzerland, The Netherlands, Turkey, United Arab Emirates, United Kingdom, Ukraine) (categorised under SIEJ: Japan)	PEGI, USK, CERO	CUSA + number
R3	Asia (except Japan and South Korea) South Korea (special R3)	(categorised under SIE Asia: Brunei, Cambodia, Hong Kong, Indonesia, Lao People's Democratic Republic, Macau, Malaysia, Philippines, Singapore, Taiwan, Thailand, Vietnam) (categorised under SIEK: South Korea)	TESRI, GRAC	PLAS + number PCAS + number
R4	Australia / New Zealand (for specific titles with censorship/content edits)	(categorised under SIEE)	ACB	CUSA + number

Although PlayStation Portable has no region locking for UMD games, UMD movies are locked by region. However, Sony has confirmed that it is possible to implement region‑locking on the PSP, and the firmware will disable features based on region. For example, Asian region PSPs will not display the "Extras" option on the XMB despite having been upgraded to the U.S. version of Firmware 6.20, preventing owners of such PSPs from installing the Comic Book Viewer and the TV Streaming applications. As the applications are installed through a PC, and users from the region are not blocked from downloading them, it is possible to install them on non-Asian PSPs that have been imported into the region.

While PlayStation Vita games had the potential to be region-locked, all games released for the system are region-free.

Like with the PlayStation 3, the PlayStation 4 and PlayStation 5 are not region-locked, although it is still possible to develop region-locked games. Sony's official stance is that they discourage developers from region-locking and will only relent in special cases (as with the PS3 with Persona 4 Arena). However, as with the PlayStation 3, digital content such as downloadable content for games still requires a PSN account from the region the content was made for. That said, PSN accounts themselves are not region-locked and an account for one region can be made on a console from another one.

In the case of the PlayStation 5, both physical and digital versions of games no longer use region codes and instead used rating labels and SKU title IDs to determine the regional variant of the game. Nevertheless, both distribution methods of PlayStation 5 games are region-free.

PlayStation 5 regions for physical discs & DLC
Region	Country categorisation	Rating	SKU Title ID
America (both North and South)	Categorised under SIEA	ESRB (US), DJCTQ (Brazil), SMECCV (Mexico)	Number only Digital titles only use PPSA, regardless of region.
Europe (includes Australia)	Categorised under SIEE	PEGI (most European countries), USK (Germany), ACB (Australia)	PPSA + number
Asia (except Japan and South Korea)	Categorised under SIE Asia	TESRI (Taiwan, Hong Kong)	ECAS + number ELAS + number
Japan	Categorised under SIEJ	CERO	ELJM + number
South Korea	Categorised under SIEK	GRAC	ELAS + number

=== Sega ===
The SG-1000 does not have region lockout between Japanese and Australian systems. The same applies with SC-3000 games on cartridge and cassettes, as well SF-7000 disks.

Western Sega Master Systems have a different shape and pinout from the Japanese cartridge connector, meaning that Sega Mark III and SG-1000 games are incompatible with it. A BIOS included with western systems prevents Japanese cartridges (both Mark III and SG-1000) to be played on those systems, even with adapters. The Sega Card slot on these systems has the same pinout as its Japanese counterpart, but they cannot run Japanese and SG-1000 cards due to lack of a certain code in the ROM header. This can be circumvented by removing the BIOS IC from it. However, some European-only games such as Back to the Future Part III will refuse to boot on NTSC systems. Japanese games can be run on Power Base Converter with use of adapters, but it will not run SG-1000 games, regardless of region.

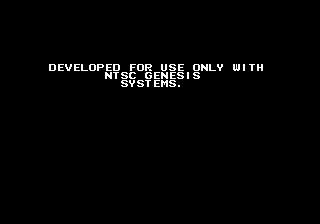
Error screen indicating that a region-locked Sega Genesis game is incompatible with European or Japanese Mega Drive consoles

Japanese Sega Mega Drive cartridges use the same pinouts as with the Genesis and PAL Mega Drive cartridges but has a different shape and will not fit in the Genesis or PAL Mega Drive slot, which has the same shape (although the Genesis 3 in the U.S. will accept Japanese titles due to its wider slot.) Japanese Mega Drive systems also has a piece of plastic that slides in a place of the cartridge when the power switch is turned on, preventing it from being removed while the console is running, thus, inserting an American or European cart will make it impossible to use on a Japanese Mega Drive (though minor modifications to the plastic locks in the systems will bypass this). The console's main board, which was designed with language and frequency jumper sets that originally activated features in the same ROM for different regions, was later used to enable software-based regional locks that display warning messages that prevent the game from being played. Switches, instead of the jumpers, were used to bypass the locks. In region-locked games, if there is a multiple language feature, it can be changed with the switches after the game has booted-up (as with the case of NTSC versions of Cyber Brawl / Cosmic Carnage for the 32X). Despite the console itself being region‑locked, most of the games, especially ones made by Sega, were region-free and could be played on any region, unless the cartridge does not fit the console. Swapping out cartridge shells between either designs will also bypass the physical lockouts of the console.

The Game Gear is region free, and some games have a dual-language feature depending on which region of the system is used. Puyo Puyo (game title changes to Puzlow Kids on Western systems) and Donald no Magical World (title changes to Ronald McDonald in Magical World in Western systems), are both Japan-exclusive games, but if run on Western units, they will be fully translated.

Sega Mega-CD games are region-locked. The region can be changed when making CD-R copies; however, this method is not completely foolproof (e.g., Sengoku Denshou in American consoles will freeze on the Sega license screen with a region-swapped CD-R copy). Furthermore, third party accessories exist that can bypass the regional-lockouts of Mega-CD games, which are inserted into the main console's cartridge slot. Flashcarts such as the Everdrive can also be used to boot any regional Mega-CD BIOS from the SD card. Different region Mega-CD consoles will also work with different region Mega Drive/Genesis systems; however, they often carry the risk of damaging the add-on if the proper voltage converters are not used. The power voltages for the add-on will vary depending on the region, therefore requiring voltage converters to prevent damage to the add-on. For instance, the Japanese Mega-CD will work in the Genesis; however, it does not use the same AC voltage as the Genesis or the American Sega CD. Likewise, the European Mega-CD will work on a Japanese Mega Drive or Genesis, but the differences in AC voltage are more staggering compared to a Japanese Mega-CD in a Genesis. In such cases, using a step-up (or step-down) converter is recommended.

Like the Mega Drive/Genesis, the use of a switch on the Sega Saturn will circumvent the region-lock, but will not change the language. In addition, the use of certain unlicensed backup/RAM cartridges will also allow a console to play games from different regions, except for games that use proprietary ROM-RAM carts. Games from different television systems may have graphical problems.

Dreamcast GD-ROM discs are region-locked; however, this could be circumvented with the use of boot discs. MIL-CDs and backup CDs are region-free.

=== Microsoft ===
==== Xbox and Xbox 360 ====
From the start, Microsoft decided to give publishers the option to choose the region(s) in which their games would be able to be played. Every original Xbox and Xbox 360 game is identified by its XeMID (Xenon Master ID). For example: "Alan Wake" (360 game, its XeMID is MS205301W0X11), and a variant of "JSRF: Jet Set Radio Future" (Xbox game, the variant SE01003J will be used). The first two characters indicate the publisher (for "Alan Wake", MS = Microsoft. For "Jet Set Radio Future", SE = Sega). 2 is the platform identifier. 2 indicates Xbox 360. Original Xbox games do not have this number, since it was the first platform to receive these IDs. 053 is the game ID. Every title has a unique value, taken from the low-order bytes of the title ID. The next two digits (01) make the SKU number. This value is unique per SKU for a particular title. Variants of the same game (for example if a game has several releases with different languages) will see this number differ: 01, 02, 03, ... There is no other "Alan Wake" version than this one. However, this is the third variant of "Jet Set Radio Future". The next letter (W for Alan Wake, J for Jet Set Radio Future) indicates the region of the disc. The last bytes of the XeMID are only present for Xbox 360 games and are less important: 0 is the base version of the title executables on the disc. The order of versions would be 0, 01, 02, 03, ... X indicates a XGD2 disc (7.3 GB) while F indicates a XGD3 disc (8.5 GB). Finally, the last two bytes indicate that it is disc 1 of 1.

Xbox has three main regions (PAL, NTSC-J and NTSC), so the region letter can either be:

- J for Japan + Korea + Southeast Asia (Taiwan, Hong Kong, Singapore, ... Usually it is just called Asia even though it is SE Asia). This corresponds to the NTSC-J region.
- E for PAL regions (Europe, Oceania, Africa, Middle East, India). This corresponds to the PAL region.
- A for America (North and South). This corresponds to the NTSC region.
- H for J + E (Japan/Asia + Europe/Oceania)
- K for A + J (America + Japan/Asia)
- L for E + A (America + Europe/Oceania)
- W for World (J+E+A, effectively all the existing regions)

An original Xbox or Xbox 360 console will belong to one of the 3 regions, and will be able to read a disc with a region ID that corresponds to its region. For example, a Canadian 360 will be able to read discs with a XeMID that has either A, K, L or W as the region letter. If two variants from different regions have the same MediaID, it means that their content is 100% the same, they just have a different label. For the original Xbox, the XeMID was directly written on the disc, on the ringcode. Ringcodes are the small letters and numbers near the center hole of discs. This means it was easy to know to which region they belong. However, for Xbox 360, the ringcode is not the XeMID, but instead an 8 character code called MediaID (for "Alan Wake": 54E34DF4), that is unique to each XeMID. The XeMID is instead stored somewhere in the files of the game.

Digital content through Xbox Live on the Xbox 360 and original Xbox are also region-locked, such as DLC, movies, and apps.

Since they both use the same region locking system, backward compatible OG Xbox games keep the same region on Xbox 360. If a game's region code was E on the original Xbox, it will also only work on PAL Xbox 360s. However, as the Xbox One and Xbox Series are using a recompiled version of the games, backward compatible Xbox and Xbox 360 games are region free on Xbox One and Xbox Series.

==== Xbox One and Xbox Series X/S ====
The Xbox One was initially planned to have a region blocking policy that would have prevented its use outside its region in an effort to curb parallel importing. Microsoft later reversed the policy and the final retail version of the console was not region-locked. It was reported, though, that the console would be region-locked in China; however, this decision has since been reverted as of April 2015.

The Xbox Series X and Series S are region-free.

=== Other ===
The TurboGrafx-16 and PC Engine (the Japanese model of the TurboGrafx-16) HuCards are region-locked, however this can be circumvented with adapters.

The Philips CD-i and the 3DO Interactive Multiplayer are region-free. Japanese 3DO units, however, have a kanji font in ROM, which is required by a few games. When such games cannot find the font, they can get locked or rendered unplayable.

The Neo Geo, Neo Geo CD, and Neo Geo Pocket line are also region-free.

Amongst PC games, regional lockout is more difficult to enforce because both the game application and the operating system can be easily modified. Subscription-based online games often enforce a regional lock by blocking IP addresses (which can often be circumvented through an open proxy) or by requiring the user to enter a national ID number (which may be impossible to verify). A number of other games using regional lockout are rare but do exist. One of the examples of this is the Windows version of The Orange Box, which uses Steam to enforce the regional lockout. Steam also enforces a form of regional lockout in adherence to German law by offering to German users special versions of some games with banned content – most notably swastikas – replaced. Steam is also used to restrict the release of the PC port of Metal Gear Rising: Revengeance to US and Europe only due to Sony having an exclusivity deal with Konami in Asia, and to restrict the Asian release of the Final Fantasy XIII trilogy to Japanese-only versions of the games. Besides the law and licensing issues, there is also a financial reason for Steam to region lock their games, since in Russia and other CIS countries prices of games on Steam are much lower than in the UK, EU, or North America.

== Printers ==
Hewlett-Packard printer cartridges have been regionalised since 2004. Thus, they do not work in printers with a different region code, unless the user calls technical support for the device to be reassigned to the appropriate region.

HP printers have four regions:

1. Americas, Greenland, Australia, New Zealand, Koreas, Mongolia, Pakistan, Nepal, Bhutan, Bangladesh, East Asia
2. Western Europe, Turkey
3. CIS, Africa, Near East, Japan
4. China (except Hong Kong), Taiwan and India

The region can be changed three times; then, the printer will be locked to a region.

Lexmark printers use different region-coding systems:

a) e.g., OfficeEdge Pro4000, OfficeEdge Pro4000c, OfficeEdge Pro5500, OfficeEdge Pro5500t, CS310, CS410 Color Laser Printer

1. Americas
2. Greenland, EU, EFTA
3. (in CS310, CS410 Color Laser Printer called Region 8): Former Yugoslavian states, except for EU members Croatia and Slovenia, and rest of world (East Europe, Africa, Near East, Asia, Australia)

b) e.g., MS710, MS810 Monochrome Laser Printer

1. USA, Canada
2. Greenland, EU, EFTA
3. Asia, Australia, New Zealand
4. Central and South America
5. Former Yugoslavian states (except Croatia and Slovenia), Eastern Europe, Turkey, Near East, Africa

Canon print cartridges for the Pixma MP 480 will not work in printers of that type with a different region code either (even when listed on the packaging of the Canon printer cartridges in question).

Epson ink cartridges are also region-coded.

Xerox also uses region codes. Their printers are shipped with neutral "factory" ink sticks with no region coding. Upon the installation of the first new ink stick after these factory sticks, the machine will set a region code based on the installed ink stick and will only accept ink stick for that region from that point forward. "Officially," only three starter ink sticks per color can be used; then, the printer will no longer accept them and will want region-coded ink sticks to be inserted, but there are workarounds for that problem.

Common region settings are:

- NA (North America)
- Metered-NA
- DMO (developing markets, such as Asia and South America)
- XE (Europe)

=== Circumvention ===
One method to bypass printer-region-coding is to store empty cartridges from the old region and refill them with the ink of cartridges from the new region, but many modern ink cartridges have chips and sensors to prevent refilling, which makes the process more difficult. On the Internet, one can find refilling instructions for various cartridge models. Another method is have ink cartridges from the old region shipped to the new region.

Some manufacturers of regionalized printers also offer region-free printers specially designed for travelers.

== Smartphones, tablets, and computers ==
=== Samsung devices ===
Starting from the Samsung Galaxy Note 3, Samsung phones and tablets contained a warning label stating that it would only operate with SIM cards from the region the phone was sold in. A spokesperson clarified the policy, stating that it was intended to prevent grey-market reselling, and that it only applied to the first SIM card inserted. For devices to use a SIM card from other regions, one of the following actions totaling five minutes or longer in length must first be performed with the SIM card from the local region:

- Make calls on the phone or watch from the Samsung Phone app
- Use the Call and Text on Other Devices feature to make calls

==== South Korea, US, Canada, and China ====
If the phone/tablet was purchased in any of these countries and the SIM card is from a different region, they cannot be used together. Although the restriction can be removed after using a local SIM card to make a call for at least five minutes, it only removes the restrictions for that particular country. Furthermore, the device may not work properly in some circumstances, such as Samsung Pay. An unlocked device purchased in these above markets can only work on other service providers within the same market where the device was purchased from, and so on, despite having the bands to work on other networks. For example, if one buys an XAA/OYM device in the United States but one is now living in China and using a Chinese SIM, the active CSC will not be changed to CHC/OYM, because the firmware does not include CHC in the multi-CSC file. As a result, the new SIM card cannot be used in a device made for another market.

===== Phones =====
- N: South Korea
- U/U1: United States of America
- W: Canada
- 0: China, Taiwan, Hong Kong, and Macao

===== Tablets =====
- N: South Korea
- U/U1: United States
- W: Canada
- C: China mainland

==== All other regions ====
The same rules still apply as usual; however, not all the countries will be unlocked for use. For example, if one buys a DBT/OXM device in Germany, but one is now living in Portugal and using a Portuguese SIM, the active CSC is potentially TPH/OXM, which makes the new SIM card usable in the new region.

===== Phones =====
- E: Latin America & Caribbean, Middle East & North Africa, India, Asia Pacific
- B: Europe & CIS

===== Tablets =====
All countries except for South Korea, USA, Canada, and mainland China fall in the B section.

==== Country Specific Codes (CSCs) for Samsung devices ====
===== Wi-Fi only devices =====
As of 2022, Samsung has simplified most CSCs into a larger one. Assume that all service providers are supported for each region. For example, if one buys an XAR/OXM tablet in the United States but one is now living in Taiwan and using a Chinese phone with a Taiwanese SIM card paired to an XAR tablet, the active CSC on both devices is potentially BRI/OXM, which makes the paired phone usable in the new region. However, if the SIM card is from mainland China, it cannot be paired with the tablet, since mainland China (CHN) is not part of the OXM multi-CSC file.

====== OXM ======
With the release of the Galaxy Tab S8 series, Southeast Asia is now Asia Pacific (APAC does not include South Korea, Japan, Taiwan or China (Mainland China and Hong Kong)).

- KOO: South Korea
- XAR: North America (USA)
- XAC: North America (Canada)
- MXO: Latin America (Mexico)
- ZBR: Latin America (Other)
- EUX: Europe (1)
- EUY: Europe (2)
- SER: CIS (Russia)
- SEK: CIS (Ukraine)
- CAU: CIS (Caucasus)
- ILO: Middle East (Israel)
- TUR: Middle East (Turkey)
- XSG: Middle East (Other, formerly UAE)
- INU: India
- XSP: Asia Pacific (formerly Singapore/Southeast Asia)
- BRI: Taiwan

===== Cellular devices =====
- OKR: South Korea (cellular devices only)
- OYM/OYN: United States (cellular devices only)
- OYA/OYV: Canada (cellular devices only)
- OWA: Puerto Rico (smartphones only)
- OWB/OWO/OWE: Latin America and the Caribbean (most cellular devices)
- OJM: Middle East (including Israel and Turkey) and Africa (some devices)
- ODM/ODI: India/South Asia (some devices)
- OLM/OLN/OLO: Southeast Asia (from 2025 also includes Indonesia) and Oceania (some devices)
- OLE/OLP: Indonesia (all devices released between 2015 and 2024, except smartwatches)
- OXE: Post-Soviet states (some devices)
- CHN/CHC: Mainland China (all devices)
- OZS: Taiwan and Hong Kong (smartphones only)
- XJP/SJP: Japan (some devices)
- OXM: Europe/All other countries (including US/Canada/South Korea/Hong Kong/Taiwan Wi-Fi only devices, as well as Hong Kong/Taiwan cellular tablets)

As of the Galaxy Tab S6, Wi-Fi only devices are no longer region locked, and the Call and Text on Other Devices features on those devices can work on SIM cards from most regions (excluding mainland China). All regions (except for mainland China) share the same CSC in their firmware version.

Starting with Windows Phone 7 for mobile devices and Windows 8 for computers, not all display languages are preinstalled/available for download on all devices with an OEM license of Windows. Users may not see all the display languages listed as options on the device or as options available for download as separate language packs. These exact options depend on the device manufacturer and country/region of purchase (and the mobile operator, if the device features cellular connectivity). Microsoft believes region locking is necessary because these display languages (which contains additional features like text suggestions, speech languages, and supplementary fonts) can take up a significant amount of storage, which leaves less space for data and media and impacts device performance. For cellular-connected devices, some mobile operators may choose not to support particular languages. For example, a wireless carrier in North America may not feel comfortable supporting European languages.

=== Google Play store ===
Starting from June 2021, Google began enforcing region-locking by preventing users from redeeming Google Play gift cards of other countries, despite user attempts to alter location with usage of VPNs. Detection is based on location history tracking and device fingerprint activity data associated with a user's Google account usage history.

=== Apple devices ===
There are provisions in place to restrict iOS features in specific locations, which include both hard-coding techniques (e.g., device model variants for different countries) and soft-coding techniques. For example, FaceTime is not available in the UAE, Oman, Qatar, and Saudi Arabia due to government restrictions on VoIP services.

An inspection of iOS 16.2's code showed a new system internally called "countryd" was added to precisely determine the user's location, to enforce restrictions determined by government regulators. The system gathers multiple data sources, such as: current GPS location, country code from the Wi-Fi router, and information obtained from the SIM card to determine the user's current country.

==== Exclusive features for the European Union ====
In March 2024, Apple released iOS 17.4, introducing a distinct set of additional features for the European Union residents to comply with the Digital Markets Act. The expanded features include: installation of apps from alternative marketplaces, installation of web browsers with alternative engines, management of default web browser settings, utilization of alternative payment methods in the app store.

To prevent non-EU users from accessing the additional features introduced in iOS 17.4, Apple has put in place measures which include: requiring a user's Apple ID region to be set to one of the EU's 27 member states, and performing routine on-device geolocation checks to ensure a user is physically present within the EU's borders. Users who travel out of the EU can continue accessing alternative app marketplaces for a grace period of 30 days. Users who are away from the EU for too long would lose access to these features; they can continue using previously installed apps but are unable to update or install apps from 3rd party app stores.

== Import gamers ==
Import gamers are a subset of the video game player community that take part in the practice of playing video games from another region, usually from Japan and Europe, where the majority of games for certain systems originate. Some common reasons for importing include:

- Wider selection of titles. Not all video games are available in all countries, and a large fraction of games are not released outside Japan. This is especially true of the visual novel medium, or many games based on licensed anime/live TV series where very few titles have ever been given overseas releases. Those who are interested in these games but do not live in Japan can only enjoy them through importing. This also applies to Anglophone European gamers who purchase North American game releases, as it offers an extended selection of English titles. Japan is not the only region to have exclusive games which attract importers, simply the most common.
- Localization issues. Many import gamers do not want games that feature edited dialogue, changed names, re-dubbed audio tracks, removal/censorship of content, and/or other similar changes which often appear in translated versions.
- Collector's value. Sometimes, an enthusiastic fan of a series that is released in their local region will buy both the domestic and the Japanese copies. This is also sometimes done for special print or premium box versions which are more common in Japanese releases than those from other regions and come with special extras.
- Language factor. Import gaming is common among students looking to improve their language skills, and for native speakers of Japanese who do not live in Japan. This is also occasionally done with games in other languages, though less commonly. Some non-students who import games would learn foreign languages (English and Japanese) just to be able to play these games. Additionally, the region provisioning in some regions does not make sense- for example, NTSC/J was assigned as the region for South-East Asia and many games were released in Japanese, despite the fact that few people in the region understood Japanese.
- Advance release. Some do not wish to wait for a game to be released in their local region, and import the Japanese (non-domestic) copies to obtain the game sooner. This is very common in English-speaking countries (i.e. UK and Australia) where games are often released later than in the USA. This is also sometimes done with consoles; shops offering advance PSP imports made news when Sony took action against them.
- Financial reasons. Due to high release-prices, it is often considerably cheaper for gamers to buy Japanese (non-domestic) versions of popular games that have already passed out of the "new release" phase of their marketing in the foreign country. Furthermore, because of variations in international exchange rates and international video game market demand, import gamers may save money by importing games instead of buying localized versions, even when shipping and handling costs and import tax are taken into consideration. This is also true within the used games market offering used import games way cheaper than local new games due to the localization delay. Before, however, the introduction of the Euro, new import games were commonly sold 40% more expensive by import shops than the European local edition. Similar price disparities exist between American and Asian markets. Additionally, certain retro games no longer being manufactured are much rarer and thus more expensive in domestic markets, while Japanese copies are more abundant and therefore cheaper.
- Technical issues. US and Japanese games were historically developed with NTSC television specs (480 lines, 60 Hz) in mind. PAL specs (576 lines, 50 Hz) used in the EU required changes to the source code of these games. While some games were rewritten accordingly, some weren't (or were done so only partially). Issues include black bars on top and bottom of the picture to make up for the 96 missing lines, resulting in a distorted image. Due to the different refresh ratio, some PAL games are about 17% slower than their NTSC counterpart. An infamous example would be the entire SquareEnix lineup on Sony systems, as well as other RPGs of different make. Users could often override these effects by applying their own software or hardware modifications to their setup (thus forcing the PAL software back into its native 480i/60 Hz resolution), but this may be out of the scope of some users, could potentially invalidate the system warranty (as opening up older cartridge-based machines was necessary to force 60 Hz), and in some instances could disrupt "PAL optimisations" that the coder applied (such as PAL-optimised video or 576i menu screens – even where the game itself was not PAL-optimized). Another factor to consider is that certain features are inherently included with software in some territories (such as the 480p/576p option on NTSC/PAL GameCube consoles and 1080i/720p exclusive to NTSC and PAL version of Microsoft Xbox), but not on others. As HDTV hardware spread however, games for the Xbox 360 and PlayStation 3 were typically programmed in 720p or 1080p (which are standard across all territories), thus eliminating the TV specs hurdle. Also - starting with the Dreamcast - most software in PAL territories included the option to play PAL software in its original 480i/60 Hz format.

=== Region-free consoles ===
While many games consoles do not allow games from other countries to be played on them (mainly due to voltage, localization and licensing issues), some consoles (often handheld, due to the universal nature of batteries) are not necessarily restricted to a certain locale. Some of these include:

- 3DO Interactive Multiplayer (Note: While the 3DO does not feature regional lockout, a few Japanese 3DO games can only be played on a Japanese console due to special kanji data not being present on non-Japanese 3DO. At the 3DO company's suggestion, the majority of game developers added these files to the game CDs so that they could be played on foreign consoles.)
- Atari Jaguar
- Atari Jaguar CD
- Game Boy
- Game Boy Advance
- Game Boy Color
- Game Gear
- Neo Geo (Note: Neo Geo software can query the system's BIOS to determine its region, however this is only used to localize certain elements, and no titles use it for region locking.)
- Neo Geo CD
- Neo Geo Pocket
- Nintendo Entertainment System (NES-101 model only, cannot play Famicom titles due to different cartridge connectors)
- Nintendo DS (Note: Games with enhanced functionality for the Nintendo DSi are region locked, though non-DSi models can play DSi-enhanced games from any region. Additionally, games for the Chinese iQue model do not run on international systems, as they lack the Chinese characters built into the iQue's firmware.)
- Nintendo Switch
- Nintendo Switch 2 (Note: The standard Japanese model of the Nintendo Switch 2 is region-locked to Japan only. All other models, including the multi-language Japanese model, are region-free.)
- PlayStation 3 (Note: The PlayStation 3 supports region locking but its use was discouraged by Sony, only two titles (Persona 4 Arena and the digital-only title Joysound Dive) were released with a region lock. Backwards compatible titles for the PlayStation and PlayStation 2 retain their original region encoding, however.)
- PlayStation 4
- PlayStation 5
- PlayStation Portable (Note: The PlayStation Portable supports region locking but its use was discouraged by Sony, only one title (Battlezone) was released with a region lock. Additionally, certain firmware features are locked depending on the system's region.)
- PlayStation Vita
- TurboGrafx-CD
- Vectrex
- Virtual Boy
- Xbox One
- Xbox Series X/S

Note: Pre-third generation consoles are not listed because at the time there was little to no importing and consequently there was little reason to introduce regional lock-out. Sometime importing difficulties may still arise (e.g. Atari 2600 games from regions the console is not from may introduce some glitches, such as missing colors).

Most handheld video game systems are region free due to most of them having a built in screen, run on batteries and being much cheaper to produce if they do not have a region lock on the system or games.

=== Disk-based protected systems ===
The majority of disk-based home consoles released in more than one region feature regional lockout, the main exceptions being the 3DO Interactive Multiplayer and the Sony PlayStation 3.

Modchips are a popular choice for many of these consoles as they are generally the easiest to use; however a poorly installed chip could permanently break the console. Some modern consoles, such as Xbox, cannot be used for online play if chipped. However, some Xbox modchips can be turned off by the user, allowing online play.

Boot disks are another common choice, as they are generally reliable and do not require risky installation methods. These disks are loaded as though they are local game disks, then prompt the user to swap them for an imported game, allowing it to run. A Wii "Freeloader" boot disk was launched by Codejunkies. However, the Freeloader boot disk was rendered unusable with the release of Firmware 3.3 for the Wii. Most Wii users have since turned to "hacking" their Wii instead using the "Twilight Hack", and when Nintendo patched the bug that allowed the exploit to take place in Firmware 4.0, users soon discovered another method, aptly called the "BannerBomb Hack". This, when combined with the Homebrew channel and a disk loader application, allows users to bypass region checks for Wii games. Aside from the Freeloader series, other boot disks include the Action Replay, the Utopia boot disk, Bleemcast!, and numerous other softmod disks.

The Sega Saturn has a fairly unusual workaround; while a disk-based console, it has a cartridge slot generally used for backup memory, cheat cards, and other utilities. This same slot can also be used for cartridges that allow imported games to run. Some of these cartridges include regional bypass, extra memory, RAM expansion(s), and cheat devices all in one, while others feature only regional bypass and cannot play certain Japanese Saturn games that require RAM expansion cartridges.

The Xbox is not very restrictive due to the console being capable of "softmods" which can do things such as make the console region-free, allowing for burned games to be used and homebrew and multimedia functionality

All three major game console makers refuse to repair any system that has been modded or if boot disks are used.

== See also ==
- CIC (10NES)
- Fan translation
- Geo-blocking
- Modchip
- NTSC-C
- NTSC-J
- NTSC
- PAL
- Parallel import
- Parallel importing in video games
- Trusted Platform Module
- Vendor lock-in
- TAC block
