= TurboPlay =

American video game magazine

Jim McDermott illustration on the cover of TurboPlay #12

TurboPlay Magazine is a bi-monthly, U.S.-based video game magazine which was published by L.F.P. from June/July 1990 through August/September 1992. It was available via subscription only (US$9.95 per year). A total of 14 issues were released, on schedule. TurboPlay exclusively covered NEC's line of video game consoles, especially the North American models: TurboGrafx-16 (PC Engine), TurboGrafx-CD (TG-CD), Turbo Duo (DUO) and the handheld TurboExpress (PC Engine GT). NEC's SuperGrafx (which was never released outside Japan) also received some minor coverage.

== Overview ==
Each 32-page issue features software and hardware reviews and previews, strategy guides and cheats, letters to the editor, one or two feature articles and contest announcements. These bi-monthly contests often required folks to be creative (as writers or artists) and winning entries were awarded one Grand Prize (typically five TG-16 software titles) and five Runners Up (typically one TG-16 software title).

Feature articles ranged from coverage of trade shows (CES, Tokyo Toy Fair) to behind-the-scenes peeks at game development (i.e. interviews with actors during the filming of FMV (full motion video) sequences for the TG-CD It Came From the Desert; interviews with the ICOM development team that created the TG-CD Addams Family).

Both HuCard (TurboChip) and CD-ROM (TG-CD) games were reviewed. Since the TG-CD library was relatively small, the bulk of reviews cover HuCard games. The format of the game reviews changed over the course of the first few issues: initially games were not given a quantitative score (issues #1 & #2), then games were graded on a scale of one to five stars (five being the best, issues #3 & #4), finally, with issue #5, TurboPlay adopted VG & CE's standard format for reviews (i.e. games were given individual scores—on a ten-point scale—for Sound/Music, Graphics, Playability and "Overall").

NEC did not produce TurboPlay, and thus did not have editorial control over its content, but NEC was the primary source of advertising revenue (NEC agreed to purchase at least four full-page ads in each issue, "indefinitely"). As a result, NEC's ads dominated the pages of TurboPlay, although one could also find ads for mail-order companies and a small roster of third-party publishers: Tengen (KLAX), Radiance Software (Sidearms), IGS (Sonic Spike, CyberCore, Sinistron, Tricky Kick), and Working Designs (Cadash, Parasol Stars, Cosmic Fantasy 2, Exile, Exile 2, Vasteel).

== Publication history and personnel ==
TurboPlay was a spin-off magazine from the editors of VideoGames & Computer Entertainment (VG&CE), a popular multi-platform magazine of the late 1980s / early 1990s. VG&CE, like TurboPlay, was published by L.F.P. The two magazines would occasionally run cross-promotions to encourage readers to subscribe to their sister publication.

Alan Hunter, Jim McDermott, Van Arno and other illustrators supplied the cover (and interior) art for TurboPlay.

Lee Pappas and Andy Eddy (respectively, publisher and executive editor of VG&CE) lent their talents to TurboPlay, as did many other VG&CE staff / reviewers. Notable writers for TurboPlay included Victor Ireland (of Working Designs fame) and Donn Nauert (a video game record holder). Donn Nauert was senior editor of TurboPlay for the first twelve issues, with Chris Bieniek taking over the reins for the final two issues.

Donn Nauert, a celebrity of sorts in the gaming community (at the time, he held many video game "high score" records in the Guinness Book of World Records and was a member of the short-lived "U.S. National Video Game Team", wrote many of the feature articles for TurboPlay, in addition to the strategy guides that appeared in nearly every issue.

Victor Ireland, another up-and-coming "celebrity" in the gaming community (he convinced the owner of Working Designs to enter the video game market and begin localizing popular titles for TG-16, TG-CD, Sega CD and later, Sony PlayStation platforms) also contributed regularly to TurboPlay. Beginning with issue #4 (Dec. 90 / Jan. 91), Victor Ireland wrote "Games Around the World", a regular column that profiled PC-Engine games available in Japan. He also covered many trade shows and even penned a feature article on "The Sound and Vision of CD+G". (CD+G—audio compact disc + graphics—was a relatively new format supported by high-end CD players, TurboGrafx-CD, and later, the Sega CD.)

Initially, the software reviews in TurboPlay were uncredited, but eventually the authors were acknowledged. Some reviewers from VG & CE (Chris Bieniek, Clayton Walnum, Donn Nauert, etc.) were commissioned to write reviews for TurboPlay as well. Donn Nauert and Chris Bieniek eventually became permanent staffers at TurboPlay.

== Importance of TurboPlay to the TG-16 gaming community ==
During the 16-bit console wars, TurboGrafx-16 struggled in the North American market and, as a result, was given marginal coverage in the major multi-platform magazines of the day. By default, TurboPlay was the only resource Turbo fans could turn to for more in-depth, consistent and timely coverage of TG-16 domestically and PC-Engine in Japan. Ultimately, it proved to be the most successful North American publication dedicated exclusively to NEC's consoles (see below for related TG-16 publications).

== Notes: related TG-16 publications ==
- NEC published TurboEdge, an official TG-16 newsletter. Only three issues were released: Spring 1991, Fall 1991, Spring 1992. Black and white, 6-8 pages apiece.
- Sendai Publishing Group, under editorial control of TTi, published four issues of Turbo Force to promote the launch of the Turbo Duo console: June 1992, September 1992, January 1993, Spring 1993. Full color, 32 pages apiece.
- After the Turbo Duo was launched, L.F.P. published three issues of Duo World that covered the new console: July/August 1993 (32 pages), September/October 1993 (16 pages), November / December 1993 (16 pages).
