= Item (game terminology) =

Collectible object in a game

In pen and paper games and video games, an item (sometimes called a pick-up) is an object within the game world that can be collected by a player or, occasionally, a non-player character.

Items are most often beneficial to the player character, providing resources such as health, ammunition, or score points. Some games contain detrimental or negative items, such as cursed armor that confers penalties or hazardous environmental pickups. Other items may hold no intrinsic value or serve purely cosmetic functions. Items are especially prevalent in role-playing games (RPGs) and adventure games, where key items are frequently required to solve environmental puzzles, complete quests, or advance the story.

Games differ in how players collect and use items. In many platformers, items take effect immediately upon contact with the player character. In other titles, such as classic beat 'em ups or early action-adventure games, items require manual collection—requiring a button press while standing near the object to collect and apply its effects. In RPGs and adventure titles, items can be collected automatically or manually and placed into an inventory to be carried and used at a time of the player's choosing.

== Types ==
Items come in various forms and are usually categorized by their function. In RPGs, an inventory user interface (UI) allows players to manage their collected items, often organized into sub-categories such as "equipment", "potions", or "quest items". In other genres, items take effect immediately upon pickup.

=== In platform games ===
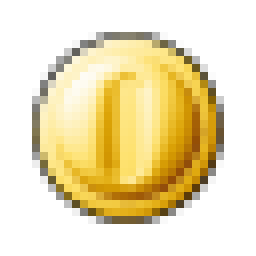
Coins are a common collectible item across many video game genres.

In many platformers, such as Sonic the Hedgehog and Super Mario Bros., items are scattered throughout levels inside item boxes or placed openly in the environment. Certain item archetypes appear across many different games:

- 1-ups (extra lives): Grant the player character an additional life, allowing them to continue playing after dying. They usually appear as an icon of the main character's face or with the text "1UP". Extra lives can often be earned by collecting a set number of minor collectibles (such as 100 rings in Sonic the Hedgehog), completing levels within time limits, or reaching specific score thresholds.
- Treasure: Items such as coins, rings, or gems are primarily used to increase the player's score. In games with an overworld or hub, players can exchange gathered treasure at shops for new abilities, upgrades, or equipment. Secret areas in levels often contain large concentrations of treasure.
- Health recovery: Items like food, medicine, or energy containers restore a character's health meter. Games like the Sonic series use primary treasure items (rings) to double as a health cushion against taking damage.
- Quest items: Also known as key items or plot items, these are required to progress through stages or finish a game. In platformers, optional quest items (such as the Chaos Emeralds in the Sonic series) are often required to unlock secret levels or the true ending.
- Negative items: Some items hinder the player character, such as Poison Mushrooms in the Super Mario series.

=== In adventure games ===
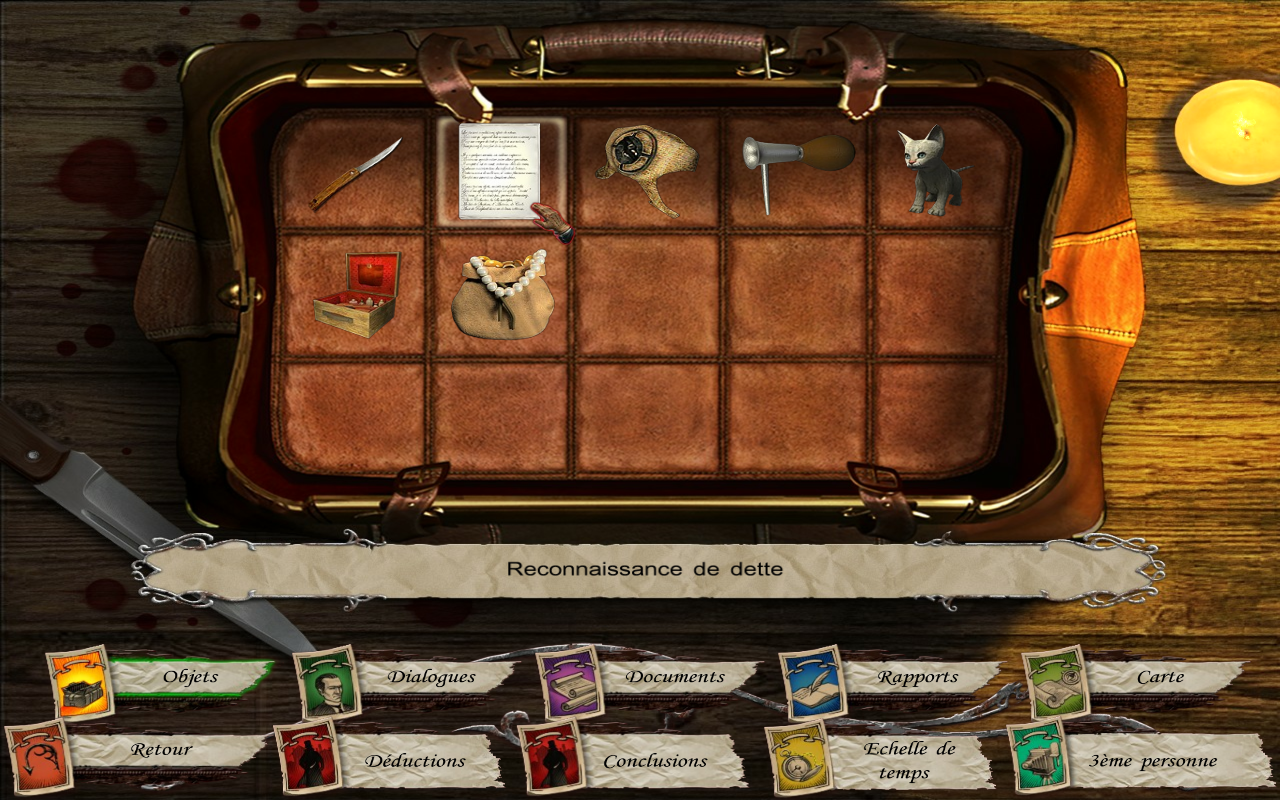
An inventory interface showing collected objects in the adventure game Sherlock Holmes Versus Jack the Ripper.

Adventure games frequently feature environmental puzzles that must be solved using specific items found while exploring. For example, in The Legend of Zelda series, tools like the Hookshot or bombs are required to cross chasms or blast through walls. In the Metroid series, key equipment like the Gravity Suit or Power Bombs allows traversal to previously inaccessible regions (a core mechanic of the Metroidvania genre). In sandbox games like Minecraft, items range from weapons and crafting tools to utility items necessary for progressing toward end-game bosses.

Keys are another standard item in adventure games, used to unlock doors and gates to progress through dungeons or levels.

=== In shooting games ===
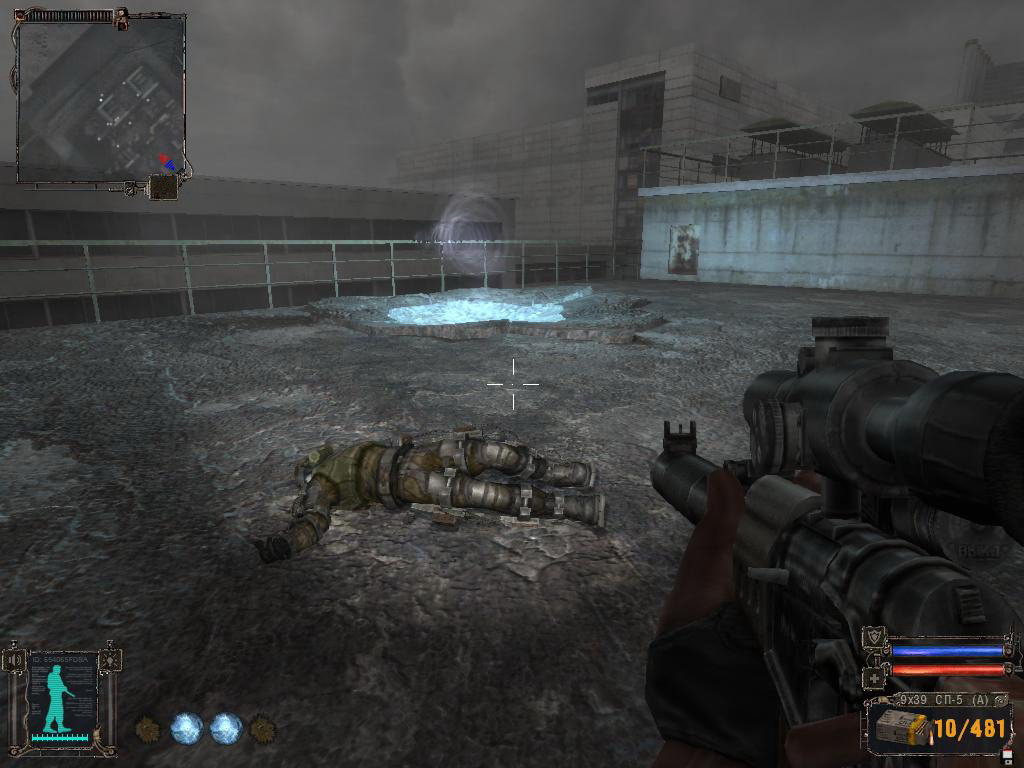
In games like S.T.A.L.K.E.R.: Shadow of Chernobyl, items can be looted from fallen enemies.

Items in shooter games primarily sustain combat operations. Common pickups include health packs to restore damage and ammunition boxes that replenish ammo for the equipped weapon. Games featuring diverse arsenals often include specialized ammunition pickups, such as rockets, grenade rounds, or fuel containers.

Players can also acquire new weapons directly from defeated enemies or designated supply crates. More powerful weapons—such as flamethrowers or rocket launchers—are typically introduced later in a game's progression.

=== In fighting games ===
While less common in standard fighting games, items appear frequently in sub-genres like platform fighters and arena brawlers. In the Super Smash Bros. series, items drop randomly onto the stage and can dramatically alter the tide of a battle (e.g., invincibility stars or heavy weapons). In combat sports games like wrestling titles, arena props such as folding chairs or tables can be picked up and used as makeshift weapons with limited durability.

=== In sports games ===
Sports titles frequently feature items through digital trading card formats in modes like FIFA Ultimate Team (now EA Sports FC). Players collect cards representing real-world athletes, managers, staff, stadiums, and performance boosts. The rarity and attributes of these item cards correspond to the real-world performance and skill level of the represented athletes.

== Works cited ==
- Hart, Casey B. (2017). The Evolution and Social Impact of Video Game Economics. Lexington Books. ISBN 978-1498543422.
- Ratliff, Jacob A. (2015). Integrating Video Game Research and Practice in Library and Information Science. IGI Global. pp. 127–206. ISBN 978-1466681767.
- Rogers, Scott (2014). Level Up! The Guide to Great Video Game Design (2 ed.). John Wiley & Sons. ISBN 978-1118877197.
- Solarski, Chris (2017). Interactive Stories and Video Game Art: A Storytelling Framework for Game Design. CRC Press. ISBN 978-1315401201.
- Steinberg, Scott; Thomas, Dave; Orland, Kyle (2007). The Videogame Style Guide and Reference Manual. Lulu.com. ISBN 978-1430313052.
- Wolf, Mark J.P.; Perron, Bernard (2008). The Video Game Theory Reader 2. Routledge. ISBN 978-1135895174.
