= Joystick (magazine) =

French computer magazine

- Issue 107 cover
- Categories: Computer magazine, Video games
- Frequency: Monthly
- Circulation: 14000
- Founder: Marc Andersen
- Founded: 1988
- First issue: 9 November 1988
- Final issue Number: 23 November 2012; 260
- Company: Sipress, Hachette Digital Presse, MER7, Anuman Interactive
- Country: France
- Based in: Paris
- Language: French
- ISSN: 1145-4806

Joystick (formerly Joystick Hebdo) was a French computer magazine that published monthly issues on PC games. It was founded in 1988 by Marc Andersen, who later left in November 1995. Originally published in the form of a 32-page weekly magazine in 1988 and 1989, it saw monthly 148-page issues (and more) past 1990. It initially sold with one or more floppy disks and then later with several CD-ROMs, and finally, until April 2012, a DVD that included complete copies of video games. In 2012, Joystick ceased distribution.

Despite 80,000 unique visitors per month to Joystick's website, it was closed in March 2002 due to the lack of profitability. It reopened in early 2008 as a summary of the magazine, including video game reviews and video game news; it would be updated irregularly until June 2012.

== History ==
The first issue of Joystick Hebdo was published on 9 November 1988 and contained cheat-code listings, game testings and reviews.

Sometime between November 1989 and January 1990, Joystick Hebdo rebranded as Joystick and began selling monthly issues.

In June 1993, Joystick was purchased by Hachette Digital Presse. In 2003, Hachette Digital Presse was acquired by Future. During this time, many editors left Joystick and created the independent publication Canard PC.

In 2011, MER7 (formerly Future France) was liquidated, causing the last issue of Joystick to release on 23 November 2012. On 8 February 2013, based on a decision by the Paris Commercial Court, Anuman Interactive acquired the Joystick brand and announced Joystick Replay in March 2013.

On 17 May 2018, ZQSD.fr and Anuman launched a podcast series to commemorate the magazine. It showcases interviews with former Joystick writers and editors.

== Joystick Replay ==
In March 2013, Anuman Interactive announced Joystick Replay, a game label that repurposes retro PC games for the modern age. It has published remakes of games such as Darkstone, Fire & Forget, Moto Racer, North Vs South, Prehistorik, Prohibition 1930 and Titan.

== Controversy ==
On 3 July 2012, in the "Summer Special" issue of that year, Kévin Bitterlin, a former journalist for Joystick, wrote in a review for the 2013 Tomb Raider game "Subjecting one of the most iconic figures in video games to such torture is just great. And I daresay it is quite exciting." Many outraged reactions launched a debate on sexism in video games in France.
