= Yuri Lowell =

- Tales character
- Yuri as seen in Tales of Vesperia
- First game: Tales of Vesperia (2008)
- Designed by: Kōsuke Fujishima
- Voiced by: English: Troy Baker; Grant George (Definitive Edition); Japanese: Kosuke Toriumi

Yuri Lowell (ユーリ・ローウェル, Yuuri Rouweru) is a fictional character introduced in the 2008 role-playing game Tales of Vesperia by Namco Tales Studio. The protagonist of the story, Yuri is a young adult from the Lower Quarter of the Imperial Capital, Zaphias. He leaves the town with a noble named Estellise in order to find a thief who stole an important instrument to his people. Across the story, he is willing to help those in need, even if he has to take extreme measures to do so, adopting a vigilante-like attitude in many situations. He also forms a guild known as Brave Vesperia when aiding Estellise. Yuri and his childhood friend Flynn are also the protagonists of the anime film Tales of Vesperia: The First Strike which details their backstories as an imperial knight protecting a town alongside his comrades.

The character of Yuri was created to be a young adult to contrast previous Tales protagonists who besides being younger were developed across their games. Yuri has been designed by Kōsuke Fujishima. His role in the film The First Strike was carefully planned to explain his role in the empire, his relationship with Flynn as well as how he decides to leave them.

Yuri also been well received with many writers for video game publications finding him as an appealing protagonist that contrasted other heroes. His role in The First Strike also received positive reception. The positive response has resulted in Yuri often appearing in polls and Tales producer Hideo Baba commenting on whether they could create another character with similar traits.

== Creation and design ==
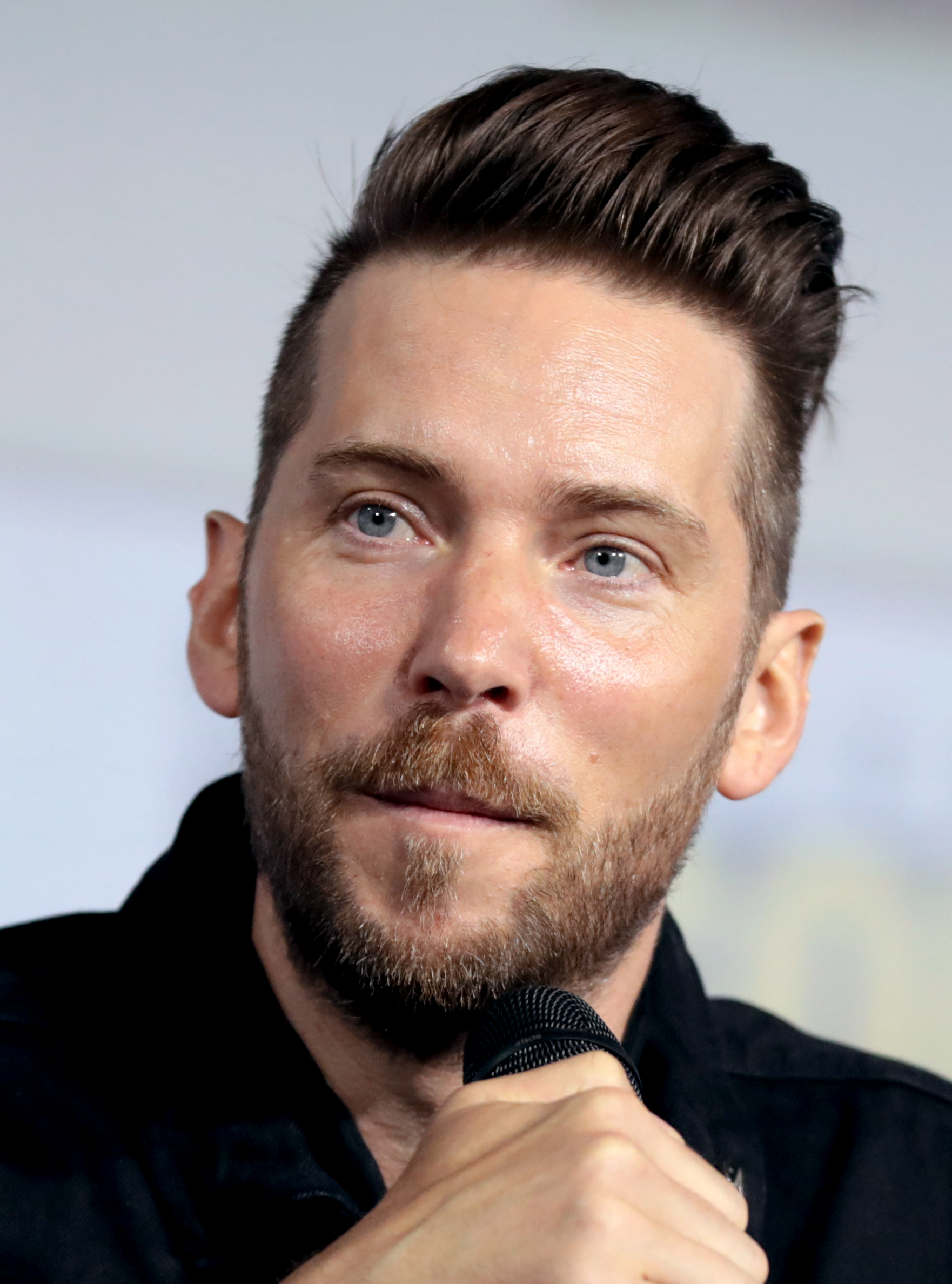
Yuri's American voice actor, Troy Baker, considered voicing him a "rarity" due to starting the dub near the same time of the original

Yuri Lowell was designed for Tales of Vesperia by regular series designer Kōsuke Fujishima. Compared to other characters like Flynn, Fujisaka found designing Yuri a challenge, as he was a type of protagonist that the series had not featured previously. Yuri was created to be different from previous protagonists in the series such as Kyle Dunamis from Tales of Destiny 2 and Luke fon Fabre from Tales of the Abyss. While the stories of previous games focused on revealing and developing these characters' personalities, Yuri was given a more adult personality. As such, Yuri was in a position to aid in the growth of the main cast. The game's theme of justice came partially from this portrayal. His deep friendship with Flynn also formed the core theme of Bonnie Pink's theme song "Ring a Bell".

Tales of Vesperia: The First Strike was affected by Yuri and Flynn's younger ages. Niren Fedrock was created to serve as a mentor figure as well as the possible future of the two's careers. Since Yuri was surer of his interest, the coming of age story was more focused on Flynn. The friendship between Yuri and Flynn was seen as "priceless" by director Kenta Kamei due to the mutual respect each other share as well as the occasion each gets angry. Kamei's favorite scene is when Yuri looks up at the sky of Ceazontania the night before the Knights expedition to the old ruins. It meant to emphasize the importance of Yuri's decision in regards to his future.

In Japanese, Yuri has been voiced by Kosuke Toriumi. Yuri has been voiced in the English version of the game by Troy Baker. Baker wanted to pay a homage to the original Japanese version, and while working with the script, Baker started understanding the character, considering sometimes what Yuri would say in the game. When he was brought into the project, the script was at a very early stage of development, meaning that he and the rest of the localization team were able to get right into Yuri's personality: Troy stated that this kind of feeling was a relative rarity in the profession. During announcements from the rerelease of Tales of Vesperia, Baker commented that he would have liked doing all of Yuri's new lines again but was never approached by the localization team. This resulted in Yuri being voiced by actor Grant George for his new lines.

== Appearances ==
=== In Tales of Vesperia ===
The 21-year-old protagonist of Tales of Vesperia, Yuri was born and raised in the Lower Quarter of the Imperial Capital, Zaphias. He was a member of the Imperial Knights, but left after only three months of service because of his contempt for the Empire's treatment of its lower citizens. He is willing to help those in need, even if he has to take extreme measures to do so, adopting a vigilante-like attitude in many situations. He is an expert fighter, capable of wielding swords and axes. He attempts to chase the thief of the aque blastia core from Zaphias' lower quarter. Along with Yuri's faithful dog Repede and a young girl named Estellise, the three leave the safety of Zaphias' barrier to chase after both Flynn and the thief. On their journey, Yuri learns about the state of the world and the philosophy of the guilds, who gave up their citizenship in order to live free from the rule of the Empire. After forming several alliances, Yuri's group stop the machinations of an evil guild leader named Barbos and recover the aque blastia core. Yuri turns the core over to Flynn and announces his intention to form a guild with Karol, later named Brave Vesperia.

Yuri, seeing how the laws of the Empire are powerless against the corruption within its officials, takes matters into his own hands and kills two corrupt officials: Ragou, a conspirator in Barbos' plot, and Captain Cumore, a high-born knight who was using his power to commit atrocities. Flynn confronts Yuri in order to settle the outstanding issue of Yuri's double homicide and his willingness to let Flynn take credit for all of his accomplishments. Yuri tells Flynn that he is the leader that the world needs right now, and that Yuri is happy to be a criminal in the shadows to achieve that end. Flynn accepts this, but warns that if Yuri continues to break the law then Flynn will have no choice but to stop him; an ultimatum that Yuri gladly accepts.

Yuri then continues working with Brave Vesperia to find a sentient creature that threatened Estellise's life. However, their mission changes when Estellise is kidnapped and face the Imperial Knights' Commandant Alexei. Although they succeed in defeating Alexei, the group sees the return of the Adephagos, a being that is capable of destroying the planet. The party then allies to find a way to destroy the Adephagos as well as to stop Duke Pantarei, who plans to use his own method of defeating the Adephagos at the cost of all human life.

=== Other appearances ===
Yuri also appears in the manga adaptation of the series as well as a novelization; the latter depicts his backstory. He also serves as one of the protagonists in the 2009 Japanese animated prequel film Tales of Vesperia: The First Strike. There, he joins the Imperial Knights because like Flynn, he wants to change the imperial law and justice. He goes on a mission to protect a town from mysterious monsters. However, their superior Niren dies in the evacuation. Fellow corpsman Garista reveals that he was attempting to create a new kind of blastia that would give humans total control over aer. After killing Garista, Yuri leaves the knights, taking Niren's blastia as a keepsake and bringing Repede along with him, saying his goodbyes to everyone in the town. The film ends with Yuri leaving the Imperial Knights and swearing to meet Flynn once again.

Outside Vesperia, Yuri has also appeared in Tales of the World: Radiant Mythology 2 and Tales of the World: Radiant Mythology 3 as a playable character. He also appears in Tales of the Heroes: Twin Brave, Tales of VS. and Tales of the World: Reve Unitia. The first print of Tales of Xillia 2 also included Yuri's outfit for Jude Mathis. Outside the Tales games, Yuri has been present in Project X Zone alongside Estellise as well as in the PlayStation Portable version of Venus & Braves. He returned in Project X Zone 2 with Flynn as his partner.

== Reception ==
Yuri has been well received by the gaming audience and publications for video games. GamesRadar listed him as the thirty-sixth best character from his generation praising his unusual traits rarely seen in other Tales protagonists. Similarly, Eliot Gay from Japanator said Yuri "was also something of a revelation. At 21, he was one of the older Tales main characters and far more mature than most JRPG fans are probably used to." In a Famitsu poll from 2010, he was voted seventh best video game character. In a Dengeki poll, he was voted fourth as a character readers wanted to befriend. Ever since his debut, Yuri has also been voted as the most popular Tales character in official polls, reaching the same spot three times. In another poll, Estelle and he were voted as the fifth best duo within the series. In addition, Yuri and Flynn ranked first in the "Best/Ideal Partners" poll 3 years in a row.

According to RPGamer, "Yuri is a compelling protagonist and even something of an anti-hero." Jared Prewitt from the same site commented that Yuri "breaks the mold of previous Tales games by being more in control with his destiny and willing to eliminate the foes that are a threat to society." In a Tales of Graces review, the reviewer commented "There are prevailing opinions that the story doesn't quite match up to that of Tales of Vesperia's, possibility heavily influenced by the absence of Yuri Lowell." GameTrailers commented on how Yuri's actions later on in the game "will test the threshold of some player's morals." 1UP.com's Andrew Fitch credited Yuri for most of the plot's enjoyment calling him "badass, charismatic ex-knight." They also compared him with Luke fon Fabre from Tales of the Abyss, finding Yuri more relatable and relevant than him, also adding that Yuri was "the embodiment of that vigilante spirit."

Eurogamer's Simon Parkin called Yuri a "strong protagonist" as he is "Old enough to be appealing to any player past their teens, yet flawed enough to be believable, he remains heroic enough to provide the leadership his role requires." Parkin also gave praise to the character's voice acting for making his character more engaging. GameSpot's Kevin VanOrd praised the interactions between Yuri and Estelle as "heartfelt" as one of the scenes that helps to further characterize them. Reviewing Tales of Vesperia: The First Strike, John Rose from the Fandom Post praised both Yuri and Flynn's characters as "neither character is simply some cardboard cutout incapable of growth or prevented from having another aspect to their personality and it is in these moments where the characters are able to show off their differences and complexities that the two really shine." Eliot Gay said both "Yuri and Flynn receive full arcs of development that get them to where they need to be by the start of the game. The film doesn't assume you know who either of these two men are and does an impressive job of defining their relationship and opposing views of the Imperial Guard." Anime News Network's Rebecca Silverman commented that both of Yuri's voice actors do a good job at "capturing his character" even though Troy Baker makes it "a little too masculine for his slightly feminine design."

When dedicating an article to the Tales of Vesperia characters RPGFan said Yuri was a beloved protagonist despite his dark actions like killing enemies based on his own principles. However, the writer believed Yuri's characterization softens when meeting Estelle as he becomes kinder when interacting with her. Meanwhile, Yuri was also noted for coming across as a mentor to Karol when it comes to making their guild while Raven comes across as Yuri's opposite due to how selfish the elder man in comparison to the protagonist. Meanwhile, Yuri and Flynn were recognized as one of the game's biggest draws for how important are their values and yet remain as close friends.

Siliconera's Spencer spoke with Tales producer Hideo Baba, commenting how Yuri was quite popular in the west due to how well developed he is as a character. He added "He knows who he is rather than searching for himself like the young "gung ho" JRPG hero archetype." In response Baba commented: "There is a possibility to have another Yuri-style character again, but I think it's important to listen to the fan's voices," Baba responded. "The development team is always creating new worlds and characters, so it's possible to see different kinds of leading characters."
