= Tales of Vesperia: The First Strike =

2009 anime film

- Theatrical release poster
- Directed by: Kanta Kamei
- Screenplay by: Reiko Yoshida
- Story by: Namco Bandai Games
- Produced by: Makoto Yoshizumi; Jun Yukawa; Hidekazu Terakawa
- Starring: Kōsuke Toriumi; Mamoru Miyano; Mai Nakahara; Rika Morinaga; Eiji Takemoto
- Cinematography: Kazuhiro Yamada
- Edited by: Junichi Uematsu
- Music by: Akira Senju
- Production companies: Namco Bandai Games; Bandai Visual; Production I.G
- Distributed by: Kadokawa Pictures
- Release date: October 3, 2009
- Running time: 110 minutes
- Country: Japan
- Language: Japanese
- Box office: $941,610

Tales of Vesperia: The First Strike (Japanese: テイルズ オブ ヴェスペリア 〜The First Strike〜, Hepburn: Teiruzu Obu Vesuperia ~The First Strike~) is a 2009 Japanese animated film by Production I.G. It is directed by Kanta Kamei and written by Reiko Yoshida, featuring the voice talents of Kōsuke Toriumi, Mamoru Miyano, Mai Nakahara, Rika Morinaga, and Eiji Takemoto. The film is the prequel to the Namco Tales Studio's role-playing game Tales of Vesperia and the first animated feature film in the Tales series. Tales of Vesperia: The First Strike revolves around the two knights, Yuri Lowell and Flynn Scifo, from the Niren Corps as they protect a town from monsters with their allies.

The project was led by Kenta Kamei who previously worked on the animated cutscenes from the Tales games. He expressed pressure due to First Strike being his debut as a director and also elaborated on how difficult was creating the storyboard. Yoshida was given the role of screenwriter in order to appeal to the female fanbase the series has always had. It was released in Japan on October 3, 2009, as a result of delays in production. Kadokawa Pictures distributed the film. It was released in North America on June 26, 2012, by Funimation Entertainment and in the United Kingdom on December 3, 2012, on DVD and Blu-ray by Manga Entertainment.

The film grossed a total of US$941,610 in Japan. Its home media release had positive sales in Japan, with the Blu-ray being one of the bestselling from the year it was released. Critical reception of the film has been generally positive for its accessibility to the non-gamers of Tales of Vesperia as well as the appeal of the main cast and the production value. Nevertheless, it has also attracted criticism for its slow pace.

== Plot ==
Using a powerful substance known as aer, the people of Terca Lumireis live in an age of discovery and prosperity. The crystallized form of aer, Apatheia, is considered a potent energy source as it is essential to human life. Large amounts of Apatheia are being produced to protect towns from attacks by monsters and create barriers around towns. One day, in a forest near the town of Shizontania, Yuri Lowell and Flynn Scifo, two knights who have just joined the Niren Corps, together with two of their senior knights and fellow Corps members, Hisca and Chastel, are sent on a mission to investigate an abnormal gushing of aer in the area.

After their first assignment to help destroy a monster infestation near the town, Yuri, Flynn, Hisca, and Chastel meet the local guild leader, Merzhom Keida. Niren, the captain of the knights stationed in Shizontania, was once dedicated to following the letter of the rules and regulation of the knights. However, he attributes the death of his wife and daughter to this trait, saying that if he had defied orders, he might have been able to protect them. The knights' efforts to repel the monsters around the area prove to be in vain. Despite being called by Commandant Alexei to attend a formal gathering at the imperial capital of Zaphias, Niren sends Flynn in his stead to attend the gathering and to request aid in defending the town. Niren and Chastel leave in search of a "strange blastia expert" named Rita Mordio. Yuri and Hisca are left to care for Lambert, Niren's hound, and Repede, Lambert's son. Niren succeeds in finding Rita Mordio and obtaining a device with which to return the aer to normal. Commandant Alexei admonishes Flynn, and his request for reinforcements to hold Shizontonia is denied until the end of the gathering. Yuri and Hisca assist in defending the town against a strange monster made out of aer. While they successfully repel the invasion, the monster takes control of Lambert along with two other wardogs. As Lambert rages out of control, Yuri is forced to kill him to protect Hisca.

When Flynn returns from Zaphias, he and Yuri come to blows, as each believes the other had an effortless assignment. Meanwhile, a platoon of high-ranking knights from central is seen in the forest being slaughtered by monsters. One survives and flees to Shizontonia's front gate, where he delivers a report to an unseen individual in the city. Niren, upon receiving the news that reinforcements would not be arriving anytime soon, decides to take the knights to investigate the source of the aer, which he believes to be a fortress at the center of a nearby lake. Flynn disagrees with Niren's decision, viewing it as disobedience of a direct order.

Garista, the strategist for the Niren Corps, attempts to dissuade Niren but to no avail. The investigation in the fortress turns out to be more dangerous as the aer begins to turn the fortress into a living weapon to attack the knights. The knights make their way into the fortress' center, where a giant blastia is found to be using the aer. Niren uses the device given by Rita to stifle the gushing of aer, but the sudden ceasing of aer flow causes a backlash, and the blastia explodes, destroying the barrier blastia that keeps Shizontonia safe, knocking out Chastel and causing the fortress to begin to crumble. As Niren attempts to carry Chastel to safety, the floor beneath him crumbles. Niren is able to throw Chastel to Yuri and is stranded in a sinkhole of gushing aer. Despite Yuri's attempts to save him, due to a wound he received during the investigation, Niren is unable to pull himself to safety. Leaving his blastia with Yuri, Niren has the knights leave without him.

The knights and the entire town mourn over Niren's death. Flynn realizes that the blastia used in the fortress where the aer abnormality originated, along with the piece he spotted on the floor, were a specialized type used only by Garista. Yuri and Flynn confront Garista with this information. Garista reveals that he attempted to create a new kind of blastia illegally but failed. He decided to leave the blastia to destroy itself, destroying Shizontonia and killing all witnesses. Yuri and Flynn attempt to arrest Garista, but a fight ensues, and Yuri kills him. In the aftermath, Shizontonia is evacuated due to the failure of the barrier blastia. Yuri leaves the knights, taking Niren's blastia as a keepsake and bringing Repede along with him, saying his goodbyes to everyone in the town. Flynn sees him off at the gates, and the two share a fond farewell, swearing to meet again.

== Voice Cast ==
Character name	Japanese	English
Yuri Lowell	Kosuke Toriumi	Troy Baker
Flynn Scifo	Mamoru Miyano	Sam Riegel
Niren Fedrok	Takashi Taniguchi	Christopher Sabat
Hisca Aiheap	Arisa Ogasawara	Trina Nishimura
Chastel Aiheap	Fumie Mizusawa	Leah Clark
Garista Luodur	Mitsuru Miyamoto	J. Michael Tatum
Merzhom Keida	Daisuke Gori	R. Bruce Elliot
Yurgis	Yasuyuki Kase	Mike McFarland
Rita Mordio	Rika Morinaga	Luci Christian
Estellise Sidos Heurassein	Mai Nakahara	Cherami Leigh
Kansuke	Yukito Soma	Ricco Fajardo
Chris	Chikara Oosaka	Newton Pittman
Elvin	Masafumi Kimura	Scott Freeman
Raven	Eiji Takemoto	Jonathan Brooks
Gradana	Wataru Takagi	Barry Yandell
Hanks	Kouzou Douzaka	Cris George
Ivan	Ryuichi Aizawa	Christopher Bevins
David	Masanori Iwasaki	Josh Grelle
Alexei Dinoia	Jurota Kosugi	Jason Douglas
Emma	Reika Uyama	Lindsay Seidel

== Development ==
Tales of Vesperia: The First Strike was officially announced in early 2009 with the staff confirming the return of Kousuke Toriumi and Mamoru Miyano as the protagonists. Production of the movie started when Tales of Vesperia was still in plot stage. The team discarded the idea of making an adaptation of the game due to its large length. The team was also against making a sequel or a sidestory due to the required time-consuming character introductions that would make it required to play the game to enjoy. Director Kenta Kamei wanted a movie that anybody would enjoy. As a result, it was decided to make it a prequel as they could explore Yuri and Flynn's background. Kamei was originally involved in the movie parts of the Tales series. When he was assigned as the movie's director, he recalls feeling "honoured, surprised and a bit nervous at the same time".

The First Strike was Kamei's first movie, and he wanted to rely on an experienced screenwriter. He eventually requested Reiko Yoshida's help as the Tales series had a strong female fanbase and thus needed "feminine sensitiveness" in designing the script. The film uses 2D and computer-generated animation. The director was demanding with the 3DCG director, and he relied on a very skilled team. He started from the director of photography, Kazuhiro Yamada, who he personally insisted to join the production. Kamei elaborated on how blending hand-drawn animation and CGI was one of the most difficult and time-consuming tasks. As a result, especially in the opening scene, the film had hand-drawn characters running on a 3D background. It took a while before he could get the result he was aiming for. The plot took two years and a half to produce. Originally, there were plans to release the movie before the game, but a delay in the schedule resulted in Vesperia being released first. Kamei believes that this was due to how demanding he was.

Much of the plot was affected by Yuri and Flynn's youth. Niren Fedrok was created to serve as a mentor figure as well as the possible future of the two's careers. Since Yuri was surer of his interest, the coming-of-age story was more focused on Flynn. This is meant to act as a counterpart to the video game, where not much of Flynn's past and his weaknesses are exposed. The friendship between Yuri and Flynn was seen as "priceless" by Kamei due to the mutual respect they share as well as the occasion each gets angry.

The storyboard took six months to complete. Kamei struggled with several difficulties as he was under pressure due to how it would influence the entire film. The climax of the film also proved difficult to make. He also noted how the first scene had the challenge of attracting the audience's attention. Kamei's favorite scene is when Yuri looks up at the sky of Shizontania the night before the knights' expedition to the old ruins. It meant to emphasize the importance of Yuri's decision in regards to his future.

=== Music ===
Tales of Vesperia The First Strike Original Soundtrack

Soundtrack album by Akira Senju
- Released: October 21, 2009
- Length: 53:17
- Label: Lantis

The music of the film was composed by Akira Senju. According to Elliot from Japanator Senju "brings an orchestral sound that really elevates the film in a way that veteran Tales series composer Motoi Sakuraba seems to struggle with these day". The Japanese version of the source game's theme song, "Ring a Bell" (鐘を鳴らして, Kane o Narashite) by Bonnie Pink, was reused as the movie's theme song, which included a clean version of the Xbox 360 version of the source game's opening movie, albeit without the close-up shot of Estelle, Yuri, Rita and Karol shown at the start. A 27-track original soundtrack, Tales of Vesperia The First Strike Original Soundtrack (テイルズ オブ ヴェスペリア ～The First Strike～ オリジナル・サウンドトラック), was released by Lantis on October 21, 2009.

Tales of Vesperia The First Strike Original Soundtrack
No.	Title	Length
1.	"序曲～魔力と魔物～ / 千住明"	1:22
2.	"First Operations / 千住明"	2:51
3.	"魔導器 / 千住明"	1:51
4.	"テイルズ オブ ヴェスペリア～The First Strike～ / 千住明"	2:09
5.	"シゾンタニアの騎士団 / 千住明"	2:24
6.	"一日を終えて / 千住明"	0:50
7.	"(ギルド / 千住明)"	1:32
8.	"Bridge ～Bonus Piece～ / 千住明"	0:22
9.	"父の追憶 / 千住明"	0:41
10.	"赤いエアルの謎 / 千住明"	2:02
11.	"帝都との軋轢 / 千住明"	2:53
12.	"予期せぬ襲撃 / 千住明"	2:53
13.	"魔物への変貌 / 千住明"	1:49
14.	"見えない作為 / 千住明"	1:32
15.	"騎士の葛藤 / 千住明"	3:07
16.	"出動へ / 千住明"	2:45
17.	"突入のとき / 千住明"	2:32
18.	"異常現象 / 千住明"	2:35
19.	"Golem Fight / 千住明"	1:32
20.	"大きな陰謀 / 千住明"	0:44
21.	"ナイレン / 千住明"	2:58
22.	"悲しみを迎えて / 千住明"	0:47
23.	"勇者との別れ / 千住明"	3:18
24.	"最後の敬礼 / 千住明"	0:34
25.	"黒幕との決別 / 千住明"	2:08
26.	"それぞれの道、一つの友情 / 千住明"	2:15
27.	"テイルズ オブ ヴェスペリア～The First Strike～ (エンディング) / 千住明"	2:51
Total length:		53:17

== Release ==
On October 3, 2009, Tales of Vesperia: The First Strike debuted in Japan's box office in seventh place with US$230,917. It grossed a total of US$941,610 in Japan and US$4,351 in Taiwan for a total of US$945,961. It was released on home media on May 28, 2010, in Japan. It was released on three different formats: DVD, Blu-ray Disc, and Universal Media Disc. In its first week of release, the DVD sold 14,314 units, while the Blu-ray ranked second in the charts. In 2010, the Blu-ray sold a total of 36,059 units.

Funimation Entertainment announced in April 2011 that they would release the movie in 2012 on Blu-ray and DVD in North America. The movie was released on June 26, 2012. In June 2011, Madman Entertainment announced they also licensed the film for an Australian release. In the United Kingdom, the film was released in December 2012 by U.K. Anime Industry. The film debuted in the sixth International Animation Film Festival of Cordoba feature film competition section.

=== Critical reaction ===
Critical reception to the film has generally been positive. Rebecca Silverman of Anime News Network gave the film a positive review. Despite criticizing the film's pace, she said that "It may still appeal primarily to fans of the game, but for those who enjoy a heroic fantasy tale, this is one worth checking out." Elliot Gay from Japanator praised the development of its cast and agreed with Frith in regards to the film's accessibility. He gave the film a "Great" 8 out of 10 calling it "A well executed film that defines its genre without resorting to cliches". John Rose from the Fandom Post praised both Yuri and Flynn's characters as "neither character is simply some cardboard cutout incapable of growth or prevented from having another aspect to their personality and it is in these moments where the characters are able to show off their differences and complexities that the two really shine." He also called the film "a fantastically animated feature that may also be one of the best adaptations of an RPG world that has been created in a different medium". Carly Frith from EGMNow gave it a score of 9 out of 10, praising its accessibility and the work from the English voice cast. He said "The story is good and absorbing with only a few times when it feels like it's tripping up" criticizing some aspects that felt poorly translated from the video game.

The film also attracted criticism. UK Anime Network's Andy Hanley stated "It has potential in its characters and concept, but does very little with them over the course of this film to make for a disappointly mediocre movie." Similar to Silverman, Jeffrey Kauffman from Blu-ray.com noted that the film had a slow pace in developing Yuri and Flynn's relationship. He gave high praise to the animation used in the story. He criticized its supporting cast as he believes "Tales of Vesperia: The First Strike is a standalone offering, or at least one that might have done better had it focused solely on Yuri and Flynn and left the rest of the 'cast of thousands' far in the background." Gay was saddened by the lack of appearances from the side characters such as Siren, Hisca, and Chastel.

The production value has been met with positive critical response. Silverman praised the film's animation, stating that "the movie is gorgeous, and not just for theatrical animation." Silverman also praised the cast, most notably Yuri's voice actors. EGMnow also gave high praise to the animation calling it "beautiful and rich" and said "It is top-of-the-line in artwork, artistic style and coloring. The action sequences, though reminiscent of the game, are not repetitive nor silly. This is a very serious movie and it was treated as such." The Fandom Post agreed saying "the feature has some absolutely stunning visuals which create lush and vibrant environments for the characters to live in which adds a wonderful polish to the work." Similar praise was given by Jeffrey Kauffman from Blu-ray.com. Andy Hanley praised the distinctive character designs despite criticizing some aspects from the fight scenes.
