= Venus & Braves =

2003 video game

Venus & Braves: Majo to Megami to Horobi no Yogen
- PlayStation 2 version cover art
- Developer: Namco
- Publisher: Namco
- Platforms: PlayStation 2, PlayStation Portable
- Release: PlayStation 2: JP: February 13, 2003; PlayStation Portable: JP: January 20, 2011
- Genre: Tactical role-playing game
- Modes: Single-player, multiplayer

Venus & Braves: Majo to Megami to Horobi no Yogen (Note: Japanese: ヴィーナス&ブレイブス〜魔女と女神と滅びの予言〜, Hepburn: Vuīnasu & Bureibusu 〜 Majo to Megami to Horobi no Yogen 〜; Venus & Braves: The Witch and the Goddess and the prophecy of Destruction) is a tactical role-playing game developed by Namco for the PlayStation 2. A pseudo-sequel to the 2-dimensional RPG Seven: Cavalry Troop of Molmorth, it takes place in the same fantasy world. Venus & Braves includes both a single player mode and multiplayer PlayStation Network battles. The game's plot revolves around an immortal warrior named Blood Boal who is sent by a goddess to save the world from destruction in a hundred years' time. The story itself takes place during the ensuing century and beyond. The game was released exclusively in Japan on February 13, 2003.

== Gameplay ==
Venus & Braves uses a "Rotation Battle System" in which seven characters are placed on a 4 block by 3 block isometric grid, and fight enemies in a similar pattern on the opposite grid. The abilities of characters are geared towards different rows; some may attack from the back row, while others may heal ally characters in the same row. Battle takes place automatically, with the player deciding whether to send the front row to the back at the end of the turn, thus "rotating" the field. As the field is rotated, the second row is sent to the front lines, and so on. If a character dies, they are permanently removed from the game.

The effectiveness of a character is determined by a number of stats, including an "assistance" attribute for attack and defense, and recovery attributes that affect the speed of a unit's healing and allow them to heal allies. There are over 50 individual unit types and 17 unit categories, and certain combinations of characters possess special abilities.

Weapons can become stronger if they are continuously used by a certain character. These weapons retain their power if they are bequeathed to a younger party member and not merely removed from their previous user.

== Plot ==
=== Characters ===
Venus & Braves revolves around Blood Boal, who, while having the appearance of a pale 18-year-old, is actually 345 years old, having been given immortality by the goddess Aria after an important battle. While previously a bloodthirsty warrior, Blood settles down into a more peaceful life before the start of the game. Aria, who travels with Blood as a fellow immortal, has full knowledge of his past and has trouble relating with humans. A witch named Vivid, who obtained immortality through similar circumstances, also has a mysterious grudge towards Blood. Throughout the game, other characters die due to the passage of time, and their age is a key statistic for discerning whether a character is at their peak performance level.

=== Setting ===
Venus & Braves is set in the same fictional world as its spiritual predecessor, Seven. The game begins in the town of Barakway, where Blood is the leader of a group of bandits. After the town is attacked, he sets out on his journey.

== Development ==
The development title for Venus & Braves was "Project Venus".

== Remake ==
The PlayStation Portable version of the game was released on January 20, 2011.

The remake features cameos from characters of Namco Bandai's RPG - the Tales series, including: Colette Brunel (Tales of Symphonia), Cless Albein, Suzu Fujibayashi, and Mint Adnade (Tales of Phantasia), Tear Grants, Luke fon Fabre, and Natalia Luzu Kimlasca-Lanvaldear (Tales of the Abyss), Phillia Felice and Leon Magnus (Tales of Destiny), Yuri Lowell (Tales of Vesperia), Asbel Lhant and Sophie (Tales of Graces) and Kyle Dunamis (Tales of Destiny 2). KOS-MOS of the Xenosaga series also appears as a cameo.

== Reception ==
Reception

Review score
Publication	Score
Famitsu	34/40 (PS2); 31/40 (PSP)

IGN called the battle system of Venus & Braves "complex and enjoyable", with "an intriguing storyline" supplementing the element of strategy in character formations. The game's artwork and sound were generally praised, with IGN calling the visuals "top-tier".
