= Tales of VS. =

2009 video game

- Developers: Namco Tales Studio; Matrix Software
- Publisher: Namco Bandai Games
- Composers: Motoi Sakuraba; Go Shiina
- Series: Tales
- Platform: PlayStation Portable
- Release: JP: August 6, 2009
- Genre: Fighting
- Modes: Single-player, multiplayer

Tales of VS. (テイルズ オブ バーサス, Teirusu Obu Bāsasu) (pronounced as "Tales of Versus") is a crossover fighting game featuring various characters across the Tales video game series. It was developed by Matrix Software and published by Namco Bandai Games for the PlayStation Portable on August 6, 2009, in Japan. It was not localized for release in any other regions.

== Gameplay ==
The game takes the basic fighting engine from the main series of Tales video games, which is called the "Linear Motion Battle System", and uses it in a crossover fighting video game in the vein of Dissidia Final Fantasy and Super Smash Bros.. Characters are able to carry out normal attacks as well as "Artes", special techniques which have been utilized in almost every Tales game. Items appear on the playing field that also affect gameplay; food such as sushi may offer a temporary stat boost, while others, like a boomerang-blade, may offer a temporary means of attack. Battles can feature up to a total of four characters at a time, with an emphasis on two on two battles, although "free for all and one vs. two battles do occur as well. Stages are interactive with different stages having different effects, such as rays of light or rolling barrels that cause damage, or disappearing and reappearing platforms for characters to jump on.

Customization also plays a large role in the game as well. Upon winning battles, characters gain experience in the form of "grade points", which are used to upgrade statistics. Grade points may be distributed and redistributed in between battles, to statistics such as health points, attack power, or defense. Additionally, grade points can be used to equip skills and abilities as well, such as a "dash" move that increases general speed, or a move that increases jumping height. Like games in the main series, characters are also able to customize their equipment, although it doesn't change the character's physical appearance.

=== Story mode ===
Shing battles Yuri in Tales of VS.

The game features a number of different game modes. The main part of the game, the "Story Mode", is where the bulk of the gameplay occurs and where the game's overall plot unfolds. In game, it is referred to as the "Yggdrasill Mode", named after the "World Tree" that the game's story is centered around. This mode focuses entirely on two on two battles, where the player chooses a preset duo, some from the same game, like Lloyd Irving and Colette Brunel of Tales of Symphonia, some being random pairings, such as Farah Oersted of Tales of Eternia pairing with Yuri Lowell of Tales of Vesperia. In the game, the player directs the characters around a World Map with preset paths and destinations, not allowing for exploration beyond the straight line. Different events occur when the character stops on different icon amongst the paths; typically leading to either story sequences, required battles, or optional side-quests. Finishing the game with certain character sets, or playing through the course of the game and making certain choices, unlocks further sets of characters to play through the game.

=== Other modes ===
There are multiple other aspect of the games beyond the "Story Mode". The game's "Arcade Mode" simplifies things down to simply continuous fights against computer-controlled opponents in a preset order, where as the "Survival Mode" plays similarly, but entails advancing for as long as possible against increasingly stronger opponents. The game also has a "Special Battle Mode", where special challenges, scenarios, or restrictions are set up for the player to do in order to win the battle. For example, a winning condition for a battle may be to use certain characters, being the first to attack, or being restricted from using certain moves. A general "Training Mode" also exists, where the player can practice moves against a dummy opponent.

A wireless "Multiplayer Mode" is also available, for up to four players to battle amongst each other. "Grade Points" earned from performance in multiplayer battles can be used in the "Story Mode" as well. In addition to the specific "Multiplayer Mode", a number of the other modes can be played with a second player in a cooperative manner as well.

Beyond the various different fighting modes, the game also has other areas, such as a specific "Customization Mode" that is just for setting up characters for battle, and an "Item Library", where unlocked content, such as music, movies, or collectable cards can be viewed.

=== Tales of Wallbreaker ===
Tales of VS. also contains a detailed mini-game, Tales of Wallbreaker, separate from the typical fighting that takes place in the rest of the main game. This part of the game opts to use a completely different graphical style than the rest of the game, modeled after traditional 2D sprite-based graphics similar to the first few Tales games. The gameplay still revolves around fighting on a 2D plane, but the goal is no longer based on draining the other character's health. Instead there are two walls, one behind each character, and the object is to attack the other character into the wall enough times to make it shatter. The mini-game contains twenty one characters, including thirteen exclusive characters that cannot be played as in the main game. While largely a stand-alone game, characters for Tales of Wallbreaker can be unlocked due to actions that take place in the "Story Mode" of the main game.

== Story ==
Unlike many cross-over scenarios, where characters from one world are transplanted into another, in Tales of VS. all of the characters from different games come together into a new, original world, called Dailantia. The world is largely drained of resources, with only four countries left, all needing the remaining resources. The four countries consist of the Holy Kingdom of Hazel, the Knight States of Fleswelg, the New Imperial Nation Niddshogg, and the Free States Alliance of Dyne. The "World Tree", the source of the world's energy (called "mana" in-game), only releases a "Great Seed" of energy every couple of years, which leads to the Nations fighting amongst themselves for ownership of it.

Instead of falling back on war, the nations come up with a diplomatic competition to decide who gets the resources. The countries would have representatives that would travel the land to collect special flags, and the country that collects all of the flags would be given the rights to the "Great Seed". The "representatives" are characters of the past games in the Tales series, and the fights between the representatives to obtain the flags make up the game's battles.

== Characters ==
Tales of VS. features a total of 35 characters from 13 previous Tales games. Character interactions and relationships are handled in a similar way to how it is handled in Dissidia Final Fantasy and Dissidia 012 crossover fighting video games; character's share their same general characteristics and relationships from their prior games, but technically have slightly different backstories. For instance, Lloyd is still Colette's guardian in Tales of VS., as he was in his original game Tales of Symphonia, but their overall goal and country they live in differs from their hometown and "World Regeneration Project" featured in their original game.

When more than one of the same character is being used in the same battle, the characters wear the same costumes but in different colors.

=== Main game ===
- Cress Alvein (Tales of Phantasia)
- Mint Adnade (Tales of Phantasia)
- Chester Barklight (Tales of Phantasia)
- Arche Klaine (Tales of Phantasia)
- Dhaos (Tales of Phantasia)
- Stahn Aileron (Tales of Destiny)
- Leon Magnus (Tales of Destiny)
- Philia Philis (Tales of Destiny)
- Mighty Kongman (Tales of Destiny)
- Farah Oerstead (Tales of Eternia)
- Kyle Dunamis (Tales of Destiny 2)
- Nanaly Fletch (Tales of Destiny 2)
- Harold Berselius (Tales of Destiny 2)
- Barbatos Goetia (Tales of Destiny 2)
- Lloyd Irving (Tales of Symphonia)
- Collette Brunel (Tales of Symphonia)
- Kratos Aurion (Tales of Symphonia)
- Presea Combatir (Tales of Symphonia)
- Mao (Tales of Rebirth)
- Eugene Gallardo (Tales of Rebirth)
- Senel Coolidge (Tales of Legendia)
- Luke fon Fabre (Tales of the Abyss)
- Tear Grants (Tales of the Abyss)
- Jade Curtiss (Tales of the Abyss)
- Anise Tatlin (Tales of the Abyss)
- Asch (Tales of the Abyss)
- Caius Qualls (Tales of the Tempest)
- Ruca Milda (Tales of Innocence)
- Iria Animi (Tales of Innocence)
- Richter Abend (Tales of Symphonia: Dawn of the New World)
- Yuri Lowell (Tales of Vesperia)
- Rita Mordio (Tales of Vesperia)
- Judith (Tales of Vesperia)
- Shing Meteoryte (Tales of Hearts)
- Kohak Hearts (Tales of Hearts)

=== Tales of Wallbreaker ===
Additionally, there are some characters that are only playable in the Tales of Wallbreaker minigame.

- Suzu Fujibayashi (Tales of Phantasia)
- Rutee Kartret (Tales of Destiny)
- Woodrow Kelvin (Tales of Destiny)
- Chelsea Tone (Tales of Destiny)
- Mary Agent (Tales of Destiny)
- Reid Hershel (Tales of Eternia)
- Max (Tales of Eternia)
- Chat (Tales of Eternia)
- Rassius Luine (Tales of Eternia)
- Celsius (Tales of Eternia)
- Frio (Tales of the World: Narikiri Dungeon 2)
- Kyaro (Tales of the World: Narikiri Dungeon 2)
- Valkyrie (Valkyrie no Bōken: Toki no Kagi Densetsu)

== Development and release ==
Tales of VS. was released on August 6, 2009, in Japan. While the game's name was trademarked in North America, and even had trailers with some English voiceovers and English text, it was never announced or released for any region outside Japan. Shortly before and after the game's Japanese release, a series of videos of the game, titled "Director's Corner" videos, were released, showcasing aspects of the game by the developers. The theme song accompanying the opening scene is "Be Your Wings", sung by Girl Next Door, and was released on August 5, 2009.

The game came packaged with a code for free DLC for the PlayStation 3 version of Tales of Vesperia, which unlocked new skits, and pre-ordering the game resulted in further DLC that unlocked new costumes in Tales of Vesperia based on Tales of the Abyss. Additionally, Tales of Vesperia contained a DLC code for Tales of VS., to unlock a special fight that unlocks special, otherwise unobtainable equipment.

A fight in Tales of VS.'s mobile version.

A radically different game under the title of Tales of VS. was also released for mobile phones. Players would be able to use a login ID and password to send and receive data from the PSP version of the game. Through this players can view status, equipment or even get bonus items. In the mobile version, players are also able to make their own characters, and change their Guild, Job, Title and Accessories. Contrary to the action-based fighting in the PSP release, the mobile version utilizes a turn-based system known as "Command Battle" in which each character has four commands: Attack, Defend, Use Skill or Counter. Each battle lasts 10 turns.

== Reception ==
Reception for the game has been mixed. Japanese gaming magazine Famitsu released a generally positive review for the game in their August 2009 issue giving the game a 8/8/8/8 a total of 32 of 40. Famitsu praised the gameplay and controls, stating "The controls are simple...but the gameplay system is remarkably deep. It's pretty basic as a multiplayer game, but I get the impression that the charms of the series are well-represented." Siliconera was also positive with the game, praising the crossover character interactions and different game modes, stating that it was "generally fun to play". Excessive load times between battles and occasional odd camera views were noted as faults of the game.

PlayStation LifeStyle was less enthusiastic regarding the game, giving it a 4/10 and stating, "Tales fans might have some reason to import this interesting spinoff, and the ones who can understand some Japanese would get a few smiles out of the story mode, but without the appeal of fanservice, we're left with a fighting game that gets boring quickly."

Initial sales of the game in Japan were high, with 133,000 copies sold in its first week, and just short of another 35,000 in its second week.
