= Chihiro Suzuki =

Japanese voice actor (born 1977)

- 鈴木 千尋
- Born: February 17, 1977 (age 49); Yamagata Prefecture, Japan
- Other names: Chi-chan; Chi-kun
- Occupation: Voice actor
- Years active: 1998–present
- Website: maharo-s.jp

Chihiro Suzuki (鈴木 千尋, Suzuki Chihiro; born February 17, 1977) is a Japanese voice actor. He made his debut role as Soichiro Arima in Kare Kano.

== Filmography ==
=== Television animation ===
1998

- Kareshi Kanojo no Jijō (Soichiro Arima)

2000

- Tottoko Hamutarō (Megane-kun and Mr Yoshi)

2001

- Dā! Dā! Dā! (Mizuki Yamamura)
- Great Dangaioh (Kuya Amagi)

2002

- Haibane Renmei (Hyohko)
- The Prince of Tennis (Akira Kamio)
- Rizelmine (Ryuunosuke Hououin)
- Rockman EXE (ElecMan.EXE)

2003

- Di Gi Charat Nyo! (Ky Schweitzer)

2004

- Elfen Lied (Kouta)
- Desert Punk (Sunabōzu/Kanta Mizuno)
- Fantastic Children (Palza)

2005

- Amaenaideyo!! (Ikkou Satonaka)
- Angel Heart (Liu Xin Hong)
- Cluster Edge (Chrome Team No. 2)

2006

- Buso Renkin (Shi)
- Makai Senki Disgaea (Vyers)
- Pumpkin Scissors (Warrant Officer Machs)
- Sumomomo Momomo (Hanzō)

2007

- Bakugan Battle Brawlers (Shun Kazami)
- Heroic Age (Mehitaka Pore)
- Ōkiku Furikabutte (Yūto Sakaeguchi)

2008

- Nintama Rantarou (Tomesaburou Kema)
- Tales of the Abyss (Luke fon Fabre, Asch the Bloody)

2009

- Bakugan Battle Brawlers: New Vestroia (Shun Kazami)
- Hipira (Georuge)

2010

- Katanagatari (Kōmori Maniwa)
- Bakugan Battle Brawlers: Gundalian Invaders (Shun Kazami)
- Inazuma Eleven (Dylan Keith)

2012

- Monsuno (Bren)

2013

- Kill la Kill (Suzuki)
- Meganebu! (Tetsu Suzuki)

2014

- Free! - Eternal Summer (Shigino Kisumi)
- PriPara (Kuma)

2017

- Yu-Gi-Oh! VRAINS (Windy)

2018

- Free! - Dive to the Future (Shigino Kisumi)

2022

- Reiwa no Di Gi Charat (Ky Schweitzer)

2024

- Bucchigiri?! (Akutaro)

2025

- Promise of Wizard (Snow)

=== Original video animation ===
- Ichi the Killer (2002) (Ichi)
- Voices of a Distant Star (2002) (Noboru Terao)
- Angel's Feather (2006) (Chris Ousaka)

=== Theatrical animation ===
- Neppu Kairiku Bushi Road (2013) (Kagato Maeda)
- High Speed! -Free! Starting Days- (2015) (Shigino Kisumi)
- Nintama Rantarō: Invincible Master of the Dokutake Ninja (2024) (Kema Tomesaburo)

=== Video games ===
- Apocripha/0 (2001) (Platina Pastenr)
- Suto*Mani: Strobe*Mania (2011) (Ritsu Rokuka)
- Arknights (2019) Steward
- Mahoutsukai no Yakusoku (2019) Snow

Unknown date

- Angel's Feather (Chris Ousaka)
- Disgaea: Hour of Darkness (Vyers)
- Disgaea 2: Cursed Memories (Tink)
- Disgaea 3: Absence of Justice (Master Big Star)
- Laughter Land (Sergi)
- Lucian Bee's Justice Yellow Didie Lightnorth
- Rockman EXE Transmission (ElecMan.EXE)
- Star Ocean: First Departure (T'nique Arcana)
- Super Robot Wars UX (Agnes Berge)
- Sweet Fuse: At Your Side (Makoto Mikami)
- Tales of the Abyss (Luke fon Fabre, Asch the Bloody)
- Tales of the World: Radiant Mythology (Luke fon Fabre)
- Teikoku Sensenki (Ki Syaraku)
- Tokimeki Memorial Girl's Side: 2nd Kiss (Itaru Hikami)
- Tokyo Babel (Hagane Oshiba)
- Wand Of Fortune Noel Valmore
- Wand Of Fortune Mirai e no Prologue Noel Valmore
- Wand Of Fortune II Jikuu ni Shizumu Mokushiroku Noel Valmore
- Wand Of Fortune II FD Kimi ni Sasageru Epilogue Noel Valmore
- Zettai Fukuju Meirei (Timo Wilkes)

=== Drama CDs ===
- Aisaresugite Kodoku series 1: Aisaresugite Kodoku (Fukami Oozora)
- Aisaresugite Kodoku series 2: Itoshisugita Shifuku (Fukami Oozora)
- Angel Game series 1: Angel Game Zenhen (Fumihiko Kaiya)
- Angel Game series 2: Angel Game Kouhen (Fumihiko Kaiya)
- Answer series 1 (Yukio Hatano)
- Answer series 2: Suggestion (Yukio Hatano)
- Corsair series (Canale Dellacqua)
- Datenshi Game series 1: Datenshi Game Zenhen (Fumihiko Kaiya)
- Datenshi Game series 2: Datenshi Game Kouhen (Fumihiko Kaiya)
- Honoka na Koi no Danpen wo (Nanaki)
- Junk!Boys (Takato Kajimoto)
- Munasawagi series (Kazuhide Sawada)
- Ourin Gakuen series 3: Sekushi Boizu de Sasayaide (Shuuichirou Kazama)
- Rossellini Ke no Musuko Ryakudatsusha (Luca Ernesto Rossellini)
- Scarlet (Harumi)
- Te wo Nobaseba Haruka na Umi (Seiji Fujige)
- Three Wolves Mountain (Jirou Tsukihara)
- TV-kun no Kimochi (Takumi Sudou)
- Wagamama Ouji ni Goyoujin (Tomoya Kurabashi)
- Yoromeki Banchou (Shinpei Wakaba)

=== Tokusatsu ===
2006

- GoGo Sentai Boukenger (Grand Beast Rei/Quester Rei (eps. 17-18 (Nomal), 19 - 20, 23, 28, 31, 33–34, 36, 39 - 42 (Quester))
- GoGo Sentai Boukenger the Movie: The Greatest Precious (Quester Rei)

2007

- Kamen Rider Den-O (Spider Imagin (Red Eye, Green Eye) (ep. 25 - 26))

2008

- Kamen Rider Den-O & Kiva: Climax Deka (Clown Imagin)
- Engine Sentai Go-onger (Savage Land Barbaric Machine Beast Drill Banki (ep. 32 - 33))

2009

- Samurai Sentai Shinkenger (Ayakashi Hyakuyappa (ep. 18))

2010

- Tensou Sentai Goseiger (Yuumajuu Waraikozou of the Gremlin (ep. 21))

=== Dubbing roles ===
==== Live-action ====
- Alien 3 (2005 Blu-ray edition) (Golic (Paul McGann))

==== Animation ====
- Tasty Time with ZeFronk (ZeFronk)
