= Tales of the Heroes: Twin Brave =

2012 video game

- Cover art
- Developer: Alfa System
- Publisher: Namco Bandai Games
- Composers: Motoi Sakuraba; Go Shiina
- Series: Tales
- Platform: PlayStation Portable
- Release: JP: February 23, 2012
- Genres: Beat 'em up, Action
- Mode: Single-player

Tales of the Heroes: Twin Brave is a 2012 hack and slash video game developed by Alfa System and published by Namco Bandai Games for the PlayStation Portable It is considered a spin-off of the Tales series, and plays similarly to the Dynasty Warriors series. The game was released in Japan on February 23, 2012.

== Gameplay ==
The game plays similarly to the Dynasty Warriors video game series. The premise of the game is to control characters from past Tales video games, and use them to fight large waves of enemies. In addition to using past game's protagonists, it is also possible to fight against past game's antagonists, and even unlock some to be played as in game.

Equipping items gives characters different statistics. Some special items even change appearance, such as giving character models a super deformed look with especially big heads.

== Development ==
A demo for the game was made available for the Japanese PlayStation Network on January 26, 2012. After the game's release, there was downloadable content for the game, in the form of new missions to play, but not through the PlayStation Store, but rather, a special Tales-related website.

== Characters ==
Heroes

Character	Game
Cless Alvein	Tales of Phantasia
Chester Burklight	Tales of Phantasia
Stahn Aileron	Tales of Destiny
Leon Magnus	Tales of Destiny
Reid Hershel	Tales of Eternia
Farah Oersted	Tales of Eternia
Kyle Dunamis	Tales of Destiny 2
Reala	Tales of Destiny 2
Lloyd Irving	Tales of Symphonia
Zelos Wilder	Tales of Symphonia
Veigue Lungberg	Tales of Rebirth
Tytree Crowe	Tales of Rebirth
Senel Coolidge	Tales of Legendia
Chloe Valens	Tales of Legendia
Luke Fon Fabre	Tales of the Abyss
Guy Cecil	Tales of the Abyss
Caius Qualls	Tales of the Tempest
Rubia Natwick	Tales of the Tempest
Ruca Milda	Tales of Innocence
Spada Belforma	Tales of Innocence
Emil Castagnier	Tales of Symphonia: Dawn of the New World
Marta Lualdi	Tales of Symphonia: Dawn of the New World
Yuri Lowell	Tales of Vesperia
Flynn Scifo	Tales of Vesperia
Shing Meteoryte	Tales of Hearts
Kohak Hearts	Tales of Hearts
Asbel Lhant	Tales of Graces
Cheria Barnes	Tales of Graces
Milla Maxwell	Tales of Xillia
Jude Mathis	Tales of Xillia

Villains

Character	Game
Elraine	Tales of Destiny 2
Schwartz	Tales of Legendia
Duke	Tales of Vesperia

== Reception and sales ==
The game topped the Japanese video game sales charts in its first week, selling 85,000 copies. However, these sales only represented a 69.47% sell-through rate for the game, and the game sold significantly less than recent spinoff Tales titles on the PlayStation Portable, such as 2009's Tales of VS. at 133,076 copies sold. Media Create felt this was due to the game containing less character interaction than most Tales games, and that some retailers had reported less interest from women as well.

The game received a score of 31/40 (8/7/8/8) from Famitsu.
