= Kohsuke Toriumi =

Japanese voice actor

Kosuke Toriumi
- 鳥海 浩輔
- Born: May 16, 1973 (age 53); Chigasaki, Kanagawa, Japan
- Occupation: Voice actor
- Years active: 1996–present
- Agent: Arts Vision
- Notable credits: Uta no Prince-sama as Cecil Aijima; Naruto as Kiba Inuzuka; Namco × Capcom and Project X Zone 2 as Strider Hiryu; Haikyū!! as Kiyoomi Sakusa; Fairy Tail as Acnologia; One Punch Man as Flashy Flash; Bleach as Szayel Aporro Grantz; Touken Ranbu as Mikazuki Munechika; Yowamushi Pedal as Shunsuke Imaizumi; Black Clover as Nozel Silva; Danganronpa: Trigger Happy Havoc as Kiyotaka Ishimaru; Tales of Vesperia as Yuri Lowell; JoJo's Bizarre Adventure: Golden Wind as Guido Mista; Dies Irae as Ren Fujii and Karl Krafft; Persona 3 as Junpei Iori; Hungry Heart: Wild Striker as Kanō Kyōsuke; Diabolik Lovers as Shu Sakamaki; Brothers Conflict as Azusa Asahina; Genshin Impact as Kaeya; Final Fantasy XIV as Zenos yae Galvus; Code Vein as Yakumo Shinonome; Cookie Run: Kingdom as Shadow Milk Cookie
- Height: 170 cm (5 ft 7 in)

Kohsuke Toriumi (鳥海 浩輔, Toriumi Kōsuke; born on May 16, 1973) is a Japanese voice actor affiliated to Arts Vision.

== Biography ==
He is a member of Nazo no Shin Unit Starmen (謎の新ユニットSTA☆MEN) and PHERO☆MEN (フェロ☆メン). To commemorate twenty years of his debut, a book entitled "Tekitō" (『てきとう』) released on May 16, 2016. He created his YouTube channel Torisan Gakkyu (鳥さん学級) on March 19, 2020.

== Filmography ==
=== Anime television series ===
1997

- Remi, Nobody's Girl – Henry, Sailor B, Subordinate, Porters
- Slayers TRY – Lizardman
- The King of Braves GaoGaiGar – Driver

1998

- DT Eightron – Garfy's Member, Waiter
- Gandalla (Nessa no Haou Gandalla) – Man B, Subordinates
- Marvelous Melmo – Shikaku, Boy, Announcer, Ikehara, TV-Analyst, Inkichi, Banchō, Jirō
- Nazca – Delinquent, Soldier
- Outlaw Star – Prisoner

1999

- Di Gi Charat – Rik Heisenberg

2000

- Saiyuki Reload: Burial – Kenyuu

2001

- Captain Tsubasa Road to 2002 – Adult Tarō Misaki
- Prétear – Hayate
- The Prince of Tennis – Kiyosumi Sengoku

2002

- Naruto – Kiba Inuzuka

2003

- Bobobo-bo Bo-bobo – Takashi
- Hungry Heart: Wild Striker – Kanō Kyōsuke
- Zatch Bell! – Uri
- Peacemaker Kurogane – Tōdō Heisuke
- Papuwa – Shintaro

2004

- Transformers: Energon – Hot Shot
- Yakitate!! Japan – Go Chimatsuri

2005

- Aria – Arashi
- Basilisk: Kouga Ninpou Chou – Kouga Gennosuke
- Elemental Gelade – Grayarts
- To Heart 2 – Yuji Kousaka

2006

- 009-1 – Borzov
- Bakumatsu Kikansetsu Irohanihoheto – Kanna Sakyōnosuke
- Black Blood Brothers – Zaza
- Crash B-Daman – Kyousuke Arasaki
- Makai Senki Disgaea – Kurtis
- Ouran High School Host Club – Akira Komatsuzawa
- Princess Princess – Masayuki Koshino
- Pumpkin Scissors – Warrant Officer Oreldo
- Saiunkoku Monogatari – Sa Kokujun

2007

- Bleach – Szayel Aporro Grantz
- Darker than Black – Yutaka Kōno
- Hayate the Combat Butler – Himuro Saeki
- Majin Tantei Nōgami Neuro – Jun Ishigaki
- Naruto: Shippuden – Kiba Inuzuka
- Romeo x Juliet – Curio
- Saiunkoku Monogatari Second Series – Sa Kokujun

2008

- Junjou Romantica – Haruhiko Usami
- Rosario + Vampire – Kozo Kasahara
- Rosario + Vampire Capu2 – Kozo Kasahara

2009

- 15 Bishoujo Hyouryuuki – Shiraishi Kazuma
- Hayate the Combat Butler!! – Himuro Saeki
- Gokujō!! Mecha Mote Iinchō – Fulansuowa-sama
- Pandora Hearts – Raven/Gilbert Nightray
- Hey, Class President! – Kokusai Yuuzo

2010

- A Certain Magical Index II – Saiji Tatemiya
- Broken Blade – Girge
- Hakuouki – Saitou Hajime
- Hakuouki: Hekketsu Roku – Saitou Hajime
- Maid Sama! – Soutarou Kanou
- Nura: Rise of the Yokai Clan – Kurotabo
- The Tyrant Falls in Love – Tetsuhiro Morinaga
- Togainu no Chi – Akira

2011

- Heart no Kuni no Alice – Sidney Black
- Hakuouki Sekkaroku – Saitou Hajime
- Kaiji: Against All Rules – Hiromitsu Ishida
- Nura: Rise of the Yokai Clan: Demon Capital – Kurotabo
- Towa no Quon – Cyborg Epsilon AKA Shun Kazami
- Toriko – Match
- Uta no Prince-sama maji Love 1000% (Season 1), Aijima Cecil

2012

- Ai no Kusabi Remake – Gai
- Aquarion Evol – Andy W. Hole
- Cross Fight B-Daman eS – Drive=Garuburn
- Dog Days – Valério Calvados
- From the New World – Inui
- Ginga e Kickoff!! – Tanaka Satoru
- Hakuouki: Reimei Roku – Saitou Hajime
- Kimi to Boku 2 – Kouichi Azuma
- Kingdom - Ping Wei
- Kuroko's Basketball – Kōsuke Wakamatsu
- Mobile Suit Gundam AGE – Asemu Asuno/Captain Ash
- Rock Lee & His Ninja Pals – Kiba Inuzuka
- Sengoku Collection, Seiichi Ōta
- The New Prince of Tennis – Kiyosumi Sengoku

2013

- Brothers Conflict – Asahina Azusa
- Diabolik Lovers,– Sakamaki Shuu
- Diamond no Ace,– Manaka Kaname
- Danganronpa: The Animation – Kiyotaka Ishimaru
- Ginga Kikoutai Majestic Prince – Visconti Giuliano
- Kuroko's Basketball 2 — Kōsuke Wakamatsu
- Makai Ouji: Devils and Realist – Gilles de Rais
- Nagi no Asukara – Uroko-sama
- Neppu Kairiku Bushi Road – Shin Kazusa
- Uta no Prince-sama Maji Love 2000% (Season 2), Aijima Cecil
- Yowamushi Pedal – Imaizumi Shunsuke
- Watamote – Ishimine Jun

2014

- Aldnoah.Zero – Sōma Yagarai
- Baby Steps – Ryuuhei Aoi
- Black Bullet – Rand Ayn
- Broken Blade – Girge
- Cross Ange – Julio Asuka Misurugi
- Donten ni Warau – Abeno Sousei
- Gugure! Kokkuri-san – Tengu
- Knights of Sidonia – Tsuruuchi Kouichi
- Nagi no Asukara – Uroko-sama
- Pokémon: XY – Saizō
- Psycho-Pass 2 – Mukoujima Riku, Yomogida
- Ryūgajō Nanana no Maizōkin – Todomatsu Shuu
- Shounen Hollywood: Holly Stage for 49 – Hayamizu Shiima
- Tokyo Ghoul – Asaki Fueguchi
- Yowamushi Pedal: GRANDE ROAD – Imaizumi Shunsuke

2015

- Aikatsu! 2 – Sunny
- Akagami no Shirayuki-hime – Chairman
- Aldnoah.Zero 2 – Sōma Yagarai
- The Heroic Legend of Arslan – Rajendra
- Baby Steps Season 2 – Ryuhei Aoi
- Binan Koukou Chikyuu Bouei-bu LOVE! – Igarao Oyaji
- Dog Days – Valério Calvados
- Diabolik Lovers, More Blood – Sakamaki Shuu
- Diamond no Ace -SECOND SEASON-– Manaka Kaname
- Fairy Tail – Acnologia
- Hokuto no Ken: Ichigo Aji – Rei
- Junjou Romantica 3 – Haruhiko Usami
- Kuroko's Basketball 3 — Kōsuke Wakamatsu
- Detective Conan – Makabe Jun (Episode 795)
- Makura no Danshi – Mochizuki Shirisu
- Mobile Suit Gundam: Iron-Blooded Orphans – Naze Turbine
- One-Punch Man – Flashy Flash
- Shounen Hollywood: Holly Stage for 50 – Hayamizu Shiima
- Star-Myu – Christian Leon Yuzuriha
- Sidonia no Kishi: Dai-kyū Wakusei Sen'eki – Tsuruuchi Kouichi
- Q Transformers: Return of the Mystery of Convoy – Red Alert
- Tinny Balloon (ふうせんいぬティニー) – Sarurīman
- Uta no Prince-sama Maji Love Revolutions (Season 3) – Aijima Cecil
- Yowamushi Pedal: Re:ROAD – Imaizumi Shunsuke

2016

- Active Raid: Kidou Kyoushuushitsu Dai Hachi Gakari – Namihei Sado/Kyokai-san
- Active Raid: Kidou Kyoushuushitsu Dai Hachi Gakari (Second Season) – Namihei Sado/Kyokai-san
- The Heroic Legend of Arslan: Dust Storm Dance – Rajendra
- B-Project: Kodou*Ambitious - Yashamaru Sakutarou
- ClassicaLoid – Chopin
- Dimension W – Salva-Enna-Tibesti
- Divine Gate – Lancelot
- Endride – Eljuia
- Hitori no Shita the outcast – Chō Reiyu
- Hakuouki: Otogisoushi – Saitou Hajime
- Kindaichi Shounen no Jikenbo R (Season 2) – Momose Shinpei (Episode 44)
- Luck & Logic – Lucifer
- Mobile Suit Gundam: Iron-Blooded Orphans S2 – Naze Turbine
- Sousei no Onmyouji — Arata Inanaki
- Tsukiuta. The Animation — Mutsuki Hajime
- Touken Ranbu: Hanamaru — Mikazuki Munechika (ep.5 - )
- Uta no Prince-sama Maji LOVE Legend Star (Season 4) — Aijima Cecil
- Udon no Kuni no Kiniro Kemari – Saeki Manabu
- WWW.Working!! – Sakaki Kenichirō

2017

- Black Clover - Nozel Silva
- One Piece - Stelly (adult)
- Room Mate - Miyasaka Shinya
- Star-Myu: High School Star Musical 2 (Lion Christian Yuzuriha)
- Saga of Tanya the Evil – Salaryman ("Tanya Degurechaff" Before Incarnation) (ep.2)
- Yowamushi Pedal NEW GENERATION – Imaizumi Shunsuke
- Kirakira PreCure a la Mode – Prince Nata
- Katsugeki/Touken Ranbu – Mikazuki Munechika
- 6 Lovers - Yuuzou Kokusai
- Sengoku Night Blood - Uesugi Kenshin
- Dies Irae - Ren Fujii/Mercurius
- Ikemen Sengoku:Toki Wo Kakeru ga Hajimarinai - Hideyoshi Toyotomi

2018

- Yowamushi Pedal GLORY LINE – Imaizumi Shunsuke
- Hitori no Shita the outcast – Chō Reiyu
- Hakyuu Houshin Engi - Shinkohyou
- Touken Ranbu: Hanamaru 2 - Mikazuki Munechika
- Pop Team Epic - Pipimi (Episode 7)
- Legend of the Galactic Heroes: Die Neue These – Ivan Konev
- Cute High Earth Defense Club HAPPY KISS! – Unazuki Taijyu
- Rokuhōdō Yotsuiro Biyori – Eisuke Kadosaki
- High School DxD Hero – Cao Cao
- Dakaichi – Kazuomi Usaka
- Aikatsu Friends! – Mushirō Haryū
- JoJo's Bizarre Adventure: Golden Wind – Guido Mista / Sex Pistols
- Ingress – Liu Tien Hua
- Gaikotsu Shotenin Honda-san – Wholesaler
- Phantom in the Twilight - Backup
- Cells at Work! - Bacillus Cereus

2019

- Meiji Tokyo Renka – Otojirō Kawakami
- The Rising of the Shield Hero – Shirono Mamoru (Previous Shield Hero)
- Endro! – Fisherman
- One-Punch Man 2 – Flashy Flash
- Ensemble Stars! – Madara Mikejima
- Beyblade Burst GT - Blind DeVoy
- Kochoki: Wakaki Nobunaga – Hayashi Michitomo
- Stand My Heroes PIECE OF TRUTH – Watabe Satoru
- The Disastrous Life of Saiki K.: Reawakened – Takumi Iguchi

2020

- Drifting Dragons – Berko
- Haikyū!! To The Top – Kiyoomi Sakusa
- A Destructive God Sits Next to Me – Shikimi Tokimune
- Cagaster of an Insect Cage – Petrov
- Arte – Yuri
- Tsukiuta. The Animation 2 — Mutsuki Hajime
- Deca-Dence – Minato
- Re:Zero − Starting Life in Another World – Kenichi Natsuki
- The Misfit of Demon King Academy – Ydol Anzeo
- Fire Force Season 2 – Hajiki
- Detective Conan — Hiro Kamijo (Episode 987)

2021

- Gekidol – Hirokazu Takezaki
- Moriarty the Patriot – Von Herder
- Kingdom Season 3 – Seikai
- Pretty Boy Detective Club – Rai Fudatsuki
- How Not to Summon a Demon Lord Ω – Vishos
- Higehiro: After Being Rejected, I Shaved and Took in a High School Runaway – Issa Ogiwara
- My Next Life as a Villainess: All Routes Lead to Doom! – Rufus Brode
- Mieruko-chan – Mamoru Yotsuya
- Deep Insanity: The Lost Child – Leslie Blanc

2022

- Requiem of the Rose King – Edward IV of York
- Trapped in a Dating Sim: The World of Otome Games Is Tough for Mobs – Jilk Fia Marmoria
- Skeleton Knight in Another World – Dillan
- Love All Play – Haruo Itachi
- Shoot! Goal to the Future – Yoshiharu Kubo
- Reiwa no Di Gi Charat – Rik Heisenberg

2023

- Opus Colors – Togo Takise
- The Aristocrat's Otherworldly Adventure: Serving Gods Who Go Too Far – Galm
- Demon Slayer: Kimetsu no Yaiba – Gyokko
- The Ancient Magus' Bride – Narcisse Maugham
- Golden Kamuy 4th Season – Takuboku Ishikawa
- Mushoku Tensei: Jobless Reincarnation 2 – Soldat Heckler

2024

- The Weakest Tamer Began a Journey to Pick Up Trash – Verivera
- Touken Ranbu Kai: Kyoden Moyuru Honnōji – Mikazuki Munechika
- A Salad Bowl of Eccentrics – Suzuki
- Highspeed Etoile – Lorenzo M. Salvatore
- Go! Go! Loser Ranger! – Green Keeper
- Welcome Home – Tomohiro Matsuo
- Pokémon Horizons: The Series – Aoki
- My Deer Friend Nokotan – Narrator
- Tower of God 2nd Season – Maddox
- Seirei Gensouki: Spirit Chronicles 2nd Season – Lucius Orgueille

2025

- Übel Blatt – Fargo
- Sakamoto Days – Saw
- My Hero Academia: Vigilantes – Soga Kugisaki
- With Vengeance, Sincerely, Your Broken Saintess – Ross Dedmond

2026

- Yoroi-Shinden Samurai Troopers – Saizō
- High School! Kimengumi – Don Harumage
- A Gentle Noble's Vacation Recommendation – Rei
- The Oblivious Saint Can't Contain Her Power – Nathan
- Red River – Prince Mattiwaza
- I'm Looking for Zombies – Aki's father

=== OVA ===
1996

- Shinseki GPX Cyber Formula SAGA 「ROUND3 CRITICAL DAYS」 – Reporter

1997

- Princess Rouge – Ota Tsutomu

2003

- Hunter × Hunter: Greed Island – Goreinu

2004

- Hunter × Hunter: G.I. Final – Goreinu

2012

- Pokémon Mystery Dungeon: Gates to Infinity Animated Shorts - Umbreon

2013

- Yowamushi Pedal: Special Ride – Imaizumi Shunsuke

2014

- Juuza Engi: Engetsu Sangokuden - Gaiden Youzhou Genya – Sousou

2016

- Star-Myu: High School Star Musical (Lion Christian Yuzuriha)

=== ONA ===
2018

- Sword Gai – Hakim

2025

- Record of Ragnarok III – Siegfried

=== Anime films ===
2012

- Road to Ninja: Naruto the Movie – Kiba Inuzuka
- Code Geass: Boukoku no Akito 1 - Yokuryuu wa Maiorita – Anou Pierre

2013

- Hakuouki Movie 1: Kyoto Ranbu – Saitou Hajime
- Persona 3 The Movie: No. 1, Spring of Birth – Iori Junpei
- Mobile Suit Gundam AGE: Memory of Eden - Captain Ash/Asemu Asuno

2014

- Hakuouki Movie 2: Shikon Soukyuu – Saitou Hajime
- Kushimitama Samurai – Yami
- Persona 3 The Movie: No. 2, Midsummer Knight's Dream – Junpei Iori
- THE LAST -NARUTO THE MOVIE- – Kiba Inuzuka
- Yowamushi Pedal: Re:RIDE – Imaizumi Shunsuke

2015

- Code Geass: Boukoku no Akito 3 - Kagayaku Mono Ten yori Otsu – Anou Pierre
- Gekijōban Meiji Tokyo Renka: Yumihari no Serenade – Otojirō Kawakami
- Persona 3 The Movie: No. 3, Falling Down – Iori Junpei
- Sidonia no Kishi Movie – Tsuruuchi Kouichi
- Yowamushi Pedal Movie – Imaizumi Shunsuke
- Yowamushi Pedal Re:ROAD – Imaizumi Shunsuke

2016

- Gekijōban Meiji Tokyo Renka: Hanakagami no Fantasia – Otojirō Kawakami
- Kuroko no Basket Movie 1: Winter Cup Soushuuhen - Kage to Hikari – Wakamatsu Kōsuke
- Persona 3 The Movie: No. 4, Winter of Rebirth – Iori Junpei
- Yowamushi Pedal SPARE BIKE – Imaizumi Shunsuke

2017

- Kuroko's Basketball The Movie: Last Game — Kōsuke Wakamatsu
- Fairy Tail: Dragon Cry — Acnologia

2019

- Blackfox – Kasumi
- My Hero Academia: Heroes Rising – Mummy

2020

- WAVE!! Surfing Yappe!! – Hayamichi Inada

2021

- Dakaichi: Spain Arc – Kazuomi Usaka

2022

- Uta no Prince-sama: Maji Love ST☆RISH Tours – Cecil Aijima

2023

- My Next Life as a Villainess: All Routes Lead to Doom! The Movie – Sora

2024

- Yamato yo Towa ni: Rebel 3199 – Seiya Kitano

2025

- Cute High Earth Defense Club Eternal Love! – Taiju Unazuki

=== Puppet ===
2016

- Thunderbolt Fantasy Touriken Yuuki - Lǐn Xuě Yā (Rin Setsu A) / Lüè Fēng Qiè Chén (Ryō Fū Setsujin) / Guǐ Niǎo (Kichō)

2017

- Thunderbolt Fantasy: The Sword of Life and Death - Lǐn Xuě Yā (Rin Setsu A) / Lüè Fēng Qiè Chén (Ryō Fū Setsujin) / Guǐ Niǎo (Kichō)

2018

- Thunderbolt Fantasy Touriken Yuuki 2 - Lǐn Xuě Yā (Rin Setsu A) / Lüè Fēng Qiè Chén (Ryō Fū Setsujin) / Guǐ Niǎo (Kichō)

2021

- Thunderbolt Fantasy Touriken Yuuki 3 - Lǐn Xuě Yā (Rin Setsu A) / Lüè Fēng Qiè Chén (Ryō Fū Setsujin) / Guǐ Niǎo (Kichō)

2025

- Thunderbolt Fantasy Touriken Yuuki 4 - Lǐn Xuě Yā (Rin Setsu A) / Lüè Fēng Qiè Chén (Ryō Fū Setsujin) / Guǐ Niǎo (Kichō)

=== Tokusatsu ===
- Mirai Sentai Timeranger (2000) – Assaulter Borg (ep. 24)
- Kamen Rider Den-O (2007) – Anthopper Imagin Ari (Kirigiris Voiced by: Tomokazu Seki) (ep.31-32)
- Kamen Rider Decade (2009) – Buffalo Lord / Taurus Ballista (ep. 12 - 13)
- Cho Kamen Rider Den-O & Decade Neo Generations: The Onigashima Warship (2009) – Gelnewt (Voiced by: Nobuyuki Hiyama, Yoshimasa Tanno)
- Kamen Rider × Kamen Rider × Kamen Rider The Movie: Cho-Den-O Trilogy - Episode Red (2010) – Anthopper Imagin Ari, Piggies Imagin (Second Son (Voiced by: Kazuya Nakai (Eldest Son), Tetsuya Kakihara (Third Son))
- Kamen Rider OOO (2011) – Ei-Sai Yummy (ep. 23 - 24)
- Kaizoku Sentai Gokaiger (2011) – Vannain (ep. 31)
- Tokumei Sentai Go-Busters (2012) – Rhino Doubler (ep. 31 - 32)
- Zyuden Sentai Kyoryuger (2013) – Debo Kokodoko (ep. 8)
- Ressha Sentai ToQger (2014) – Rainbow Line President (eps. 31 - 32, 35, 44, 47)
- Ressha Sentai ToQger vs. Kyoryuger: The Movie (2015) – Rainbow Line President

=== Dubbing ===
==== Live-action ====
- Avengers: Doomsday - Scott Summers / Cyclops (James Marsden)
- The Final Girls – Chris Briggs (Alexander Ludwig)
- Jeepers Creepers – Darry Jenner (Justin Long)
- The Last King of Scotland – Nicholas Garrigan (James McAvoy)
- The Perfect Host – John Taylor (Clayne Crawford)
- Princess Hours – Lee Yul (Kim Jeong-hoon)
- Step Up Revolution – Eddy (Misha Gabriel)
- You Got Served – David (Omarion)

==== Animation ====
- Spider-Man: Across the Spider-Verse – Johnathon Ohnn / The Spot

=== Game ===
- Another Eden - Ewan
- Arknights - Broca
- Akane-sasu Sekai de Kimi to Utau – Abe no Seimei
- Atelier Ayesha: The Alchemist of Dusk – Juris Grunden
- Baten Kaitos: Eternal Wings and the Lost Ocean – Kalas
- Beast Master & Prince – Alfred
- BlazBlue: Cross Tag Battle – Gordeau
- Blaze Union: Story to Reach the Future – Garlot
- Brothers Conflict: Passion Pink – Asahina Azusa
- Brothers Conflict: Brilliant Blue – Asahina Azusa
- Captain Tsubasa: Dream Team – Ramon Victorino
- Clock Zero – Hanabusa Madoka/Bishop
- Code Vein – Yakumo Shinonome
- Cookie Run: Kingdom – Shadow Milk Cookie
- Diabolik Lovers – Sakamaki Shuu
- Diamond no Kuni no Alice ~Wonderful Wonder World~ – Sidney Black
- Diamond no Kuni no Alice ~Wonderful Mirror World~ – Sidney Black
- Disgaea – Kurtis
- Dies Irae – Ren Fujii/Mercurius
- Dangan Ronpa: Academy of Hope and High School Students of Despair – Kiyotaka Ishimaru
- Dragon Ball Xenoverse – Demigra
- Dynasty Warriors 8 – Li Dian
- Ensemble Stars – Mikejima Madara
- Estpolis: The Lands Cursed by the Gods – Idura
- Etrian Odyssey Untold: The Millennium Girl – Hero
- Fate/Extra – Archer/Robin Hood
- Fate/Grand Order – Asterios, Robin Hood
- Final Fantasy XIV - Zenos Yae Galvus
- Fushigi Yūgi: Suzaku Ibun – Tasuki
- Gakuen Club – Takizawa Saku
- Gakuen Heaven 2: Double Scramble (2014) – Masatsugu Takato
- Genshin Impact (2020) – Kaeya
- Granblue Fantasy – Mikazuki Munechika, Isaac
- Grand Chase: Dimensional Chaser (2018) – Rufus Wilde
- Hakuōki Shinsengumi Kitan (PS2) (2008) – Saitou Hajime
- Hakuōki Portable (PSP) (2009) – Saitou Hajime
- Hakuōki Zuisouroku (PS2) (2009) – Saitou Hajime
- Hakuōki Zuisouroku Portable (PSP) (2010) – Saitou Hajime
- Hakuōki Shinsengumi Kitan (Mobile Game) (2010) – Saitou Hajime
- Hakuōki DS (Nintendo DS) (2010) – Saitou Hajime
- Hakuōki Junsouroku (PS3) (2010) – Saitou Hajime
- Hakuōki Reimeiroku (PS2) (2010) – Saitou Hajime
- Hakuōki Yuugiroku (PSP) (2010) – Saitou Hajime
- Hakuōki 3D (Nintendo 3DS) (2011) – Saitou Hajime
- Hakuōki Reimeiroku Portable (PSP) (2011) – Saitou Hajime
- Hakuōki Yuugiroku DS (Nintendo DS) (2011) – Saitou Hajime
- Hakuōki Zuisouroku DS (Nintendo DS) (2011) – Saitou Hajime
- Hakuōki Reimeiroku DS (Nintendo DS) (2012) – Saitou Hajime
- Hakuōki Reimeiroku Nagorigusa (PS3) (2012) – Saitou Hajime
- Hakuōki SSL ~Sweet School Life~ (PS Vita) (2014) – Saitou Hajime
- Hakuōki Reimeiroku Omohase Sora (PS Vita) (2015) – Saitou Hajime
- Hakuōki Shinkai (PS Vita) (2015) – Saitou Hajime
- Hakuōki Zuisouroku Omokage Hana (PS Vita) (2015) – Saitou Hajime
- Harukanaru Toki no Naka de 3: Izayoiki – Fujiwara no Yasuhira
- Heart no Kuni no Alice – Sidney Black
- Hyakka Hyakurou Sengoku Ninpou-chou aka Nightshade (2016)– Chojiro Momochi
- I/O – Kosuke Miyata
- JoJo's Bizarre Adventure: All Star Battle R – Guido Mista
- JoJo's Bizarre Adventure: Last Survivor – Guido Mista
- Jyuzaengi Engetsu Sangokuden (PSP) – "Sou Sou"
- Lucian Bee's Resurrection Supernova – Viola
- Lucian Bee's Justice Yellow – Viola
- Lucian Bee's Evil Violet – Viola
- Luminous Arc – Heath
- Mega Man 11 – Acid Man
- Mermaid Prism
- Mobile Suit Gundam Battlefield Record U.C. 0081 – Fritz Bauer
- Moujuutsukai to Oujisama – Alfred
- Namco × Capcom – Strider Hiryu, Strider Hien
- Onmyōji – Onikiri
- Pachi-Slot Tekken 4 – Claudio Serafino
- Persona 2: Innocent Sin – Eikichi Mishina
- Persona 3 – Junpei Iori
- Persona 4 Arena Ultimax – Junpei Iori
- Persona Q: Shadow of the Labyrinth – Junpei Iori
- Pokémon Masters – Takeshi
- Project X Zone – Yuri Lowell
- Project X Zone 2 – Yuri Lowell, Strider Hiryu
- Rune Factory 4 - Leon
- Samurai Love Ballad: PARTY - Sanada Nobuyuki
- Sengoku Night Blood - Uesugi Kenshin
- Several Shades of Sadism (SSS) – Toma Kira
- Shinobi – Shirogane
- Shinobi, Koi Utsutsu – Sanada Yukikage
- Shiritsu Berubara Gakuen ~ Berusaiyu no Bara Re* imajineishon ~ (2019) - Philippe Hanson
- Sol Trigger – Farel
- Soul Nomad & the World Eaters – Endorph
- Soulcalibur II – Hong Yun-seong
- Soulcalibur III – Hong Yun-seong
- Soulcalibur III: Arcade Edition – Hong Yun-seong
- Soulcalibur IV – Hong Yun-seong
- Soulcalibur: Broken Destiny – Hong Yun-Seong
- Street Fighter Alpha 3 – Fei Long
- Street Fighter V - Nash
- Strider 2 – Strider Hiryu
- Super Smash Bros. for Nintendo 3DS and Wii U – Little Mac
- Super Smash Bros. Ultimate - Little Mac
- Tales of Vesperia – Yuri Lowell
- Tenshou Gakuen Gekkou Hasumi – Kyouragi Takashi
- To Heart 2 – Yūji Kōsaka
- Tokimeki Restaurant – Date Kyoya (X.I.P Leader)
- Touken Ranbu - Mikazuki Munechika
- Ultimate Marvel vs. Capcom 3 – Phoenix Wright
- Under Night In-Birth – Gordeau
- Uta no Prince-sama – Aijima Cecil
- VitaminX – Nanase Shun
- VitaminX Evolution – Nanase Shun
- VitaminZ – Nanase Shun
- VitaminZ Evolution – Nanase Shun
- VitaminXtoZ – Nanase Shun
- Yume100 Prince – Haku & Raven
- Zettai Zetsumei Toshi 3 – Naoki Kousaka
- Yakuza: Like a Dragon – Masato Arakawa / Ryo Aoki
- Zone of the Enders – Slash, Corporal, Boy A
- Pokémon Masters EX – Raihan
