= Luke fon Fabre =

Fictional character from Tales of the Abyss

- Tales character
- Luke as seen in Tales of the Abyss
- First game: Tales of the Abyss (2005)
- Designed by: Kōsuke Fujishima
- Voiced by: Yuri Lowenthal (English); Chihiro Suzuki (Japanese)

Luke fon Fabre (Japanese: ルーク・フォン・ファブレ, Hepburn: Rūku fon Fabure; Luke fone Fabre) is a fictional character introduced in the 2005 role-playing video game Tales of the Abyss by Namco Tales Studio. Luke is a young swordsman who has been living in a mansion in the Kimlasca Kingdom for seven years after being kidnapped and suffering from amnesia. His pampered life turns upside down when he unwittingly becomes the target of a military-religious organization known as the Order of Lorelei, who believe him to be the key to an ancient prophecy. Across his journey, Luke fights to stop an impending war and matures as a person. He has also appeared in the anime and manga versions of the game as well other games within the Tales series.

Namco's staff created Luke to be a flawed person who, despite being unlikable because of his personality, would mature across the game. He was designed by Kōsuke Fujishima who wanted his appearance to show his laziness, a sense of fashion, as well as the fact he practises martial arts.

Critical reception to Luke's character has ranged from negative to positive based on his development in Tales of the Abyss. While initially seen as an unlikable person, his growth into a respectable hero across the story arc received praise from critics. He has also appeared in multiple Tales polls where he has been voted as one of the series' most popular characters.

== Creation and design ==
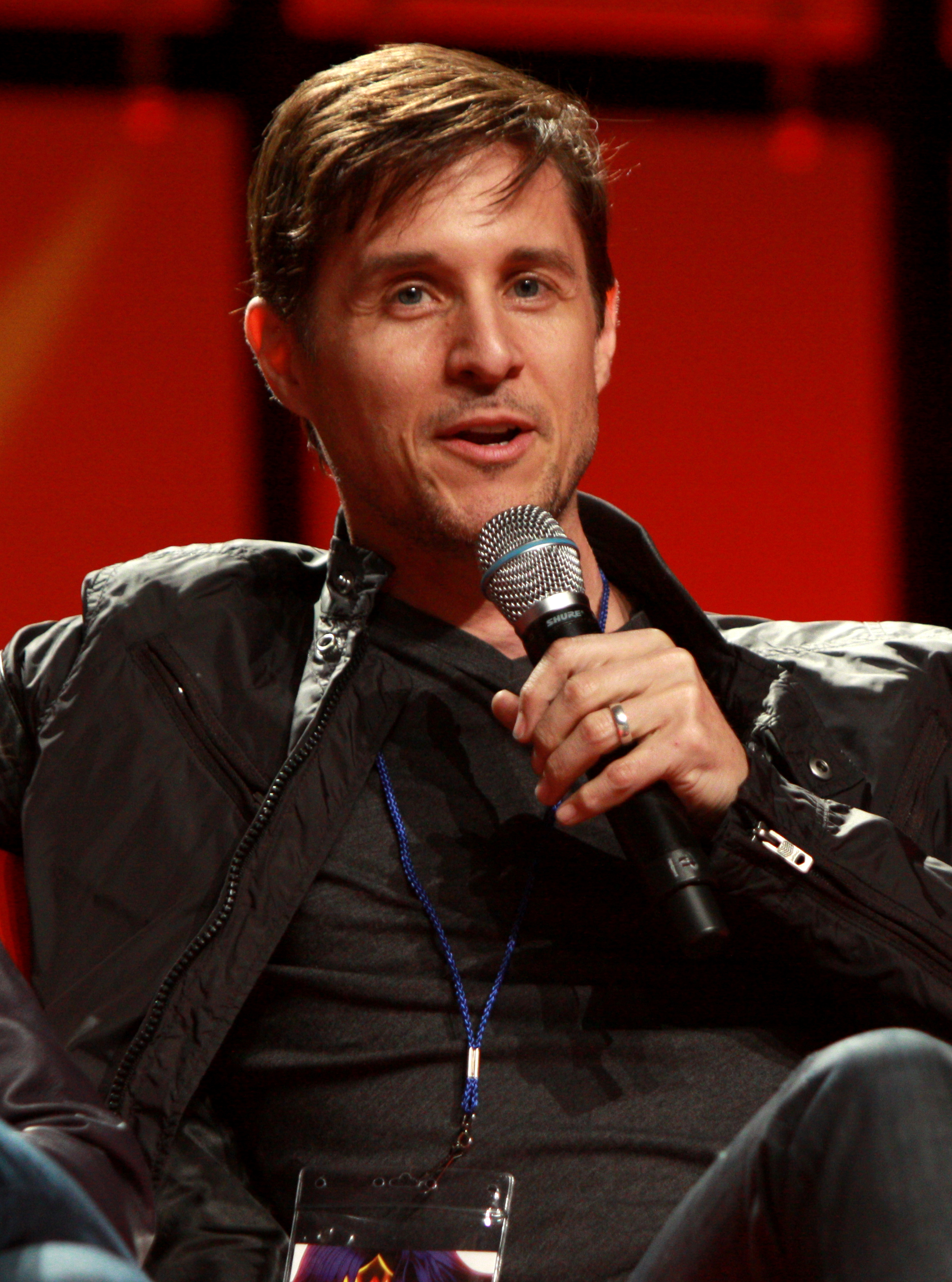
Yuri Lowenthal voices Luke in the English dub

Makoto Yoshizumi, the producer of Tales of the Abyss explained that studio staff made the protagonist, Luke, unlikable by being "selfish" and "annoying" at the outset of the game. These negative personality traits were designed to cause gamers to dislike him but over the course of the game, he would mature into someone so likable that the other main characters would comment, "Huh, Luke's not that bad". While such a character could turn off many players, Yoshizumi preferred a cast of "flawed characters" rather than a story in which "the fated protagonist had a perfect life and a perfect upbringing, and he grew up to defeat the demon king".

During early promotions of the games, one of the staff members, Yasuhiro Fukaya, noted multiple fans disliked the character. However, upon ending the game which developed him, fans started liking him. Fukuya shared the same feelings to the point of calling Luke his favorite Tales character. The staff wanted Luke to gradually change across the narrative so that players would notice his character arc and feel him likable during this process. Another important part involving Luke was how he starts bonding with the playable characters in the story and find how they start working together. Although Luke is the protagonist of the game, the staff commented that his relationship with Asch is also one of the main themes, describing them as almost the same character.

Character designer Kōsuke Fujishima noted that while Luke's clothing makes him look lazy, it was okay to have clothes that are outrageous since the setting was designed to have him wear the most fashionable clothes of his time. He decided to show Luke's abdomen to demonstrate that he was a combatant in the game. Fujishima remains anxious about Luke's design wondering what people think about his abdomen always showing. Luke's pose is the result of Fujishima's research in fashion books, which feature images of boys who look like they hang out at Shibuya.

Luke's English voice actor is Yuri Lowenthal, who noted he could relate to the character because of his selfish nature and comically noted he lacked Luke's development. His Japanese voice actor is Chihiro Suzuki, who was chosen over Yasunori Matsumoto, who also wanted the role. Suzuki had no idea of the game's setting or how Luke looked since there were no images. He was told to use Shibuya as an image. Suzuki enjoyed doing the audio drama of the series and ended up confused in regards to who was the final character to appear in the game's ending. Overall, Suzuki enjoyed Luke's characterization.

== Appearances ==
Luke cutting his hair signifies a change in his character to avoid making the same mistakes

The main protagonist of the game, Luke is 17 and is the only son of a noble family in the kingdom of Kimlasca-Lanvaldear. After being kidnapped at age ten, Luke lost all of his childhood memories, and after being returned home was confined to the safety of the fon Fabre manor. His isolation leads him to become a rather immature, selfish individual with next to no knowledge of the world. His only hobby is swordsmanship. During a training session with Van Grants, Luke tries to protect his teacher from the assassin Tear Grants and the two are transported to the outer world. On his way back, Luke meets Colonel Jade Curtiss from the Malkuth forces who requests his help to stop an impending war using his status as a noble. When reuniting with Van, he learns he possesses the ability to create a "hyperresonance" on his own, an extremely powerful ability when two fonists of the same type use their abilities in tandem. Luke is convinced by his teacher to use his power to become a hero and stop war so that he would not be used as a weapon. Van manipulates him into using the hyperresonance to save the town of Akzeriuth from miasma and become a hero. However, this results in the town's destruction and Luke losing everyone's trust.

After Akzeriuth's destruction, Luke learns that he is actually a seven-year-old isofonically identical "replica" of Asch, the real Luke fon Fabre. This event, along with the abandonment of his friends, prompts Luke to change himself for the better, cutting his hair as a symbol of his resolve. He also asks Tear to look after him and to watch over him. Across the game, Luke also develops feelings for her to the point he once tries to confess them but decides not to. He then starts working with his comrades to protect the towns like Akzeriuth from being destroyed by using his hyperressonance on the Sephiroth trees. He fights Van, who wishes to create a new world of replicas, and emerges victorious.

A month after Van's defeat, Luke and his comrades become concerned with the appearance of miasma in the world. With no way of making it go away, Luke eventually decides to sacrifice himself alongside the new replica to destroy the miasma. Although he survives, a doctor later tells him he has little time to live. As he is dying Asch gives Luke what remains of his power allowing him to perform Second Order hyperressonance. Luke then confronts Van once again using his powers to free the spirit of Lorelei. After Van's death, Luke, along with Asch's corpse, is engulfed in a blinding light as Luke frees Lorelei. One year after the battle on Eldrant, and three years after the start of his initial journey, Luke is presumed to be dead. However, on the night of his coming of age ceremony, his twentieth birthday, Luke reunites with his friends.

Luke reprises his role from the game in the manga and anime adaptations of the series, as well as in the manga spin-off Tales of the Abyss: Asch: the Bloody. The Tales of the Abyss fandisc also features two segments where Luke roleplays with Tear and goes to visit a doctor, Jade. Luke also appears in Tales of the World: Radiant Mythology and the sequels Tales of the World: Radiant Mythology 2 and Tales of the World: Radiant Mythology 3 as a playable character. In Tales of the Heroes: Twin Brave, Luke appears in Guy's serious scenario as his partner. He is also playable in Tales of VS. Outside the Tales series, he also appears in the PlayStation Portable version of Venus & Braves.

== Reception ==
Critical reception to Luke fon Fabre has ranged from negative to positive based on his appearances in Tales of the Abyss. Based on his first impression of the game, Jeff Haynes from IGN called Luke a "spoiled and sheltered child" and noted how he was the opposite of Tear. GameSpot's Ashton Raze noted that Luke "is highly obnoxious, at least at first, and the way the other characters riff off his behavior is entertaining." Casey Brienza from Anime News Network (ANN) saw Luke's interactions with Cheagle Mieu as a big appeal in the anime's second episode. "Anyone who has ever briefly nurtured homicidal thoughts when confronted by yet another cute anime creature will rejoice at his comedic whack-a-mole treatment and die laughing at his instantaneous hatred of its high-pitched squeal". Carl Kimlinger also from ANN found the character irritating. Christian Nutt of GamesRadar noted that Luke will probably annoy most players saying "though any guy who's made it through his teens will wince... this stuff cuts close to the bone." He also annoys the game's other characters and "when the first big plot twist hits, they take it out on him - too much". Alex Fuller of RPGamer commented that: "The exceedingly good handling of character development is easily Abyss' biggest storytelling strength. Luke's journey from selfish and sheltered brat into the final hero of the game is plotted superbly." Dan Whitehead of Eurogamer commented that Luke, in particular, stands out within the RPG genre's heroes "as his evolution from spoiled brat to worthy hero is enjoyably organic."

RPGFan's Abraham Ashton Liu commented that Luke was highly different from previous Tales protagonists because of his prominent unlikable traits which made his growth in the game highly notable. Game Informer's Kimberley Wallace praised the development of the character as well as his relationship with Tear, commenting the two had one of the best moments in the game during the ending. On the other hand, Keza MacDonald of IGN felt his character development was "from total obnoxious jerk to slightly less of an obnoxious jerk" as the other characters were more likable than him. UK Anime Network's Kevin Leathers said that while Luke's development lacked originality, in the end manages to entertains players.

In a Famitsu poll from 2010, Luke was voted as the forty-ninth best video game character. He has also appeared in official Tales popularity polls where he was voted as one of the most popular characters from the series. He appeared third in the fourth poll, while in the following two he was fourth. In another poll in 2014, he was voted second. The character has also been popular with cosplayers.

Universidade Federal de Algoas said that Luke starts as a petty character due to his poor personality and selfish attitude despite being from high class. After a catastrophe that is the result of Luke's stubbornness and ego, a whole city is decimated, and this results in him being scolded by his companions and consequently abandoned. The writer praised the young man's noticeable character's arc due to how he deals with the idea of being Asch's replica and tries to become a better person in the process. Similar to the tagline of the video game Tales of the Abyss, Luke's quest leads him not only being a better person but instead find a meaning to life despite his nature and the sacrifices he has to makes in order to redeem himself. Besides his personality, the writer praised how the character design father symbolizes his personality with his initial look standing out with his messy long hair and a commoner clothing. However, after cutting his hair, Luke starts becoming a more inspiring character.

In The Role-Playing Society: Essays on the Cultural Influence of RPGs, Luke is referenced as having one of the most influential character developments in gaming history due to finding a balance in his noble quest when deciding to become a better person, acknowledging his flaws. Luke's growth was compared to that of Riku from Kingdom Hearts who goes through distinctive growth in his franchise and found that both can be seen in the narrative of Meina of Alel.

Game Informer heavily praised Luke and Tear's relationship due to how they both have character's arc in Tales of the Abyss that help to complement each other; While Luke starts a poor natured and often complains about his life, Tear tries to hide her emotions when interacting with others to the point of coming across as a cold woman. When Luke decides to redeem himself, he asks Tear to look over his spiritual mission which results into a strong romantic relationship related with catastrophe. By the game's ending, Luke has to fulfill his role in protecting the world at the cost of his life which makes Tear beg him to promise to him to survive and return to her. This leads to the ending of their arcs as Luke has become a mature person while Tear has opened her emotions to him, confessing her love for in the aftermath.

Despite the constant praise to Luke's journey, Escapist Magazine regarded him as one of the worst protagonist in gaming history as a result of his constant complaints and antisocial attitude he shows through most of the game's first half.

Richard Eisbeins from Kotaku praised Luke's character development in a review of the anime. He commented that while "Luke starts the series as one of the most unlikable protagonists in all anime", it "becomes less and less prominent over the first eight episodes of the series—as he develops a hero complex of sorts which drives him into the jaws of disaster. From that point on, however, he tries frantically to be better than he was—to think for himself and to do what he feels is right. And despite the occasional minor setback, he succeeds." They further praised the dynamic Luke has with Tear due to how the latter often helps the former with his quest for redemption.

== See also ==
- Characters of Tales of the Abyss
