= Tales of Vesperia =

2008 roleplaying video game

- PAL region Xbox 360 cover art, featuring the main cast
- Developer: Namco Tales Studio (Note: Definitive Edition developed by QLOC.)
- Publisher: Namco Bandai Games
- Director: Yoshito Higuchi
- Producers: Tsutomu Gouda; Yoshito Higuchi
- Artists: Kōsuke Fujishima; Daigo Okumura
- Writers: Takashi Hasegawa; Koki Matsumoto; Takaaki Okuda
- Composers: Motoi Sakuraba; Hibiki Aoyama
- Series: Tales
- Platforms: Xbox 360; PlayStation 3; Nintendo Switch; PlayStation 4; Windows; Xbox One
- Release: Xbox 360: JP: August 7, 2008; NA: August 26, 2008; EU: June 26, 2009; AU: June 25, 2009; PlayStation 3: JP: September 17, 2009; Definitive Edition; Nintendo Switch, PlayStation 4, Windows, & Xbox One: WW: January 11, 2019
- Genre: Action role-playing game
- Modes: Single-player; Multiplayer

Tales of Vesperia (Note: テイルズ オブ ヴェスペリア, Teiruzu Obu Vesuperia) is an action role-playing game developed by Namco Tales Studio. The tenth mainline entry in the Tales series, it was released for the Xbox 360 and published in Japan and North America by Namco Bandai Games in 2008, and in European territories in 2009. An expanded port of the game for the PlayStation 3 was released in 2009 in Japan. An enhanced version, subtitled Definitive Edition, was released for the Nintendo Switch, PlayStation 4, Windows, and Xbox One in January 2019. The gameplay is similar to previous Tales games, featuring a new version of the series' trademark action-based "Linear Motion Battle System", while also introducing new elements such as online leaderboards.

Vesperia is set in the world of Terca Lumireis, which uses an energy source called aer that is regulated by devices called Blastia. This powers much of the magic of the world, including creating protective barriers around its cities. The story focuses on Yuri Lowell, a former Imperial soldier who forms a guild called Brave Vesperia to aid Estelle, a noble woman he encounters on a mission. As they explore the world, Brave Vesperia are challenged by factions who have different plans related to the abuse of blastia resources, and Yuri is forced to confront his friend and former comrade Flynn.

Preliminary work on Vesperia began in 2005, with full development starting the following year, lasting approximately two years. Returning staff included producer Yoshito Higuchi, composers Motoi Sakuraba and Shinji Tamura, and character designer Kōsuke Fujishima. The writers included Takashi Hasegawa and Hideo Baba. Developed by the same team that made Tales of Symphonia and Tales of the Abyss, it was designed for the Xbox 360 as the PlayStation 3 had yet to be shown to the company and the former console was achieving international popularity. The anime cutscenes were created by Production I.G, with an art style influenced by cel-shaded animation. The game's theme song, "Ring a Bell / Kane o Narashite", is by Bonnie Pink, Tales of Vesperia's characteristic genre name is RPG to Enforce "Justice" (「正義」を貫き通すRPG, "Seigi" o tsuranukitōsu RPG). The game received positive reviews and has sold over 2.8 million copies worldwide across all platforms. Further media related to the world of Vesperia have been released, including the prequel film Tales of Vesperia: The First Strike.

== Gameplay ==
Tales of Vesperia is an action role-playing game set in a fantasy world featuring three-dimensional environments and characters. The game's environments are split into two types. On the field map, the main characters navigate reduced-scale environments. A compass and mini-map are displayed, along with towns, other named locations, and enemy icons. Striking an enemy icon triggers a battle, while interacting with a town causes the party to enter it. In battle and towns or similar locations, characters move around environments built on a lifelike scale relative to the human characters. In these areas, the party may interact with non-player characters. Within these environments, items such as crates can be moved by the currently assigned character. After a certain point in the game, an item called the Sorcerer's Ring is given to the party, enabling them to shoot bolts of energy. These bolts can be used to activate switches, move objects, and attack enemies from a distance. Save points can be found in dungeons and towns. Items such as equipment and weapons are purchased with Gald, the in-game currency. While in environments, players can trigger optional character conversations called Skits. In Skits, characters are represented by head-and-shoulder portraits, and the conversations can range from dramatic to comedic.

Characters have several different stats and gauges: their health, a magic meter stocked by Technical Points, and Learning Points for learning skills, raising a character's respective agility or luck, and how a character reacts to attacks. Attack types are physical and magical, while defense is limited to physical attacks. Characters gain experience levels through accumulating experience points. Experience Points and Gald is earned through battles, along with recovering a degree of Technical Points and occasionally items dropped by defeated enemies. Skills, attributes that change different stats, can be assigned to each character. The number of skills that can be assigned is calculated by the number of skill points each character has available. Battling with equipment associated with a particular skill enables that character to learn it when they have filled their Learning Points meter. Cooking, creating meals with ingredients found in battle or around explored environments, can also be used by individual characters to restore their Health and Technical Points and grant temporary enhancements. Recipes are learned from a character called the Wonder Chef.

=== Battle system ===
Tales of Vesperia uses the "Evolved Flex-Range Linear Motion Battle System": the characters' status is displayed along the bottom of the screen. Featured in the display are the Over Limit gauge, an Arte title, and damage chain display.

Vesperia uses a variation on the series' trademark action-oriented Linear Motion Battle System, which plays out in a similar way to a fighting game. The variation used in Vesperia is called the "Evolved Flex-Range Linear Motion Battle System". Battles take place in an isolated battle arena within the environment, with the battle party being made up of one player-controlled character and three characters controlled by the game's artificial intelligence. The AI commands can be customized from a set of skills, with their assigned tasks affecting their actions and placement on the battlefield. Vesperia also features a local four-player multiplayer option: up to four players can connect to a single Xbox 360 console through both wired and wireless controllers. While no online multiplayer is available, players can use Xbox Live to post their respective scores, including damage chains and consecutive hit numbers, on online leaderboards. The boards can be updated by players while saving the game.

Enemies, encountered in environments as icons, react differently depending on how they are approached and attacked: using the right attack or approaching them unawares grants the party an advantage in battle. If other groups of enemies are close by, they are also drawn into the initiated battle. For both player characters and enemies, battle skills and character performance can be affected by elemental attributes. Status ailments can also be inflicted by both the party and enemies. They are divided into physical ailments and magical ailments, which have a variety of negative effects: physical effects can be effects like slowing or poisoning a character, while magical ailments can cause units to turn on their allies or automatically recover a knocked-out party member. Items used on characters can restore TP or HP, or remove status ailments. Characters learn new skills during battles, along with Titles that affect aspects of characters.

In battle, players can perform multiple actions: walking or running along a fixed axis, freely running around the battlefield, jumping in any direction, guarding against attacks, and pausing the battle to select a different enemy to attack. Characters can launch various attacks, from standard strikes to strikes that can interrupt enemy attacks. The player character's attacks can be chained together to create combo attacks, which create a continual flow of attacks without giving the enemy a chance to attack. Continual strikes activate the chance for a Fatal Strike, which kills normal enemies and heavily damages bosses. Landing successive Fatal Strikes grants bonuses at the end of the battle. During battle, landing successive strikes without taking hits fill an Over Limit meter. Once the meter is full, the player character can perform continual attacks and cast Artes without casting time during the Over Limit's duration. During battles, Secret Mission can be triggered by performing unspecified actions. Completing Secret Missions grants a bonus to the battle grade or acquire an item. All characters can use Artes, special physical and magical abilities which can range from standard attacks to healing magic. Learned by leveling up a character, Artes can be both specifically directed and have a general area of effect. Four Artes can be assigned to each character, and each Arte can be assigned to a hot key. Some Artes can be used outside battle to cure characters. In addition to standard Artes, each character can access Mystic Arts, extra-powerful cinematic attacks.

== Plot ==
The people of Terca Lumireis rely on an energy source called "blastia", devices created by the Krytia from using the crystallized remains of a powerful race known as the Entelexeia. Blastia are powered using a mystical substance known as "aer" and were used to provide resources and protection to major cities. In ancient times, misuse of blastia by the Krytia prompted the Entelexeia to absorb the excess aer generated by blastia abuses: consuming too much aer to handle, a group of Entelexeia transformed into a monster known as the Adephagos, which would consume every living thing on the planet by converting it into aer and absorbing it. (Note: "Judith: The Krytia. Stewards of wisdom, founders of the mighty Geraios, and ancient sages. Our misbegotten wisdom has sown only the seeds of ruin. The blastia we created granted us blessings, but also corrupted the aer, lifeblood of this world. / Estelle:Then Rita was right. There were disturbances in the aer in the past. / Yuri: You think this is showing a disturbance in the aer? / Karol: It looks more like the aer is trying to... eat the planet. / Elder: Hmm. It is said that a great mass of aer threatened to swallow the very planet whole. [...] / Judith: The blight grew ever stronger and brought forth a cataclysm... In our terror, we gave a name to the cataclysm: the Adephagos. [...] The world united the challenge the Adephagos, and banish the loathsome power which created it.") (Note: "Undine: ...Gusios, you... / Yuri: Undine. What happened to him? [...] / Undine: Even Entelexeia cannot they can endure... change. And... / Rita: No! / Undine: Become Adephagos themselves. ") Sacrificing humans with the innate ability to convert aer into magical energy, known as "Children of the Full Moon", they created a barrier to seal away the Adephagos. The remaining Children of the Full Moon and the Entelexeia decided on the new arrangement of the world: in future times, an unnamed Empire rules over large portions of Terca Lumireis, with the Children's descendants being its ruling family. (Note: "Yuri: The leaders of the ancients possessed an innate power, and were called Children of the Full Moon. The Shrine of Zaude received their lives and power. It sealed the Adephagos away, saving the world. [...] So the Shrine of Zaude was powered by the lives of the Children of the Full Moon? / Duke: Humans brought for the Adephagos, and lead it. Consider it...atonement. The few remaining Children of the Full Moon, together with the Entelexeia, decided how the world would be. The Imperial family are their descendants. / Yuri: So that's how the Empire started.") Ten years prior to the events of Vesperia, a new form of blastia was developed that could seriously damage Terca Lumireis' ecosystem and potentially release the Adephagos. The Entelexeia attempted to warn humanity in vain, and when they attempted to destroy the new blastia, they were defeated in a war. One of the veterans of the Great War, Duke, is utterly disillusioned with humanity after his Entelexeia companion Elucifer is seen as a potential threat and killed. (Note: "Sylph: The Great War was between humans who broke an ancient prohibition and the Entelexeia who opposed them. / Raven: And the war ended when the hero Duke won victory for the humans. [...] / Sylph: Humans alone could not have won that war. Elucifer-the leader of the Entelexeia advocating living with humans-fought alongside them, and granted them victory. / Raven: Are you serious? ...Even I never heard that... But...what does this have to do with Duke not trusting humans? / Sylph: Elucifer was Duke's friend. Duke fought with Elucifer against the leader of the ones who opposed humans, and defeated him. However, once the war ended, the empire feared Elucifer's power. They assaulted the injured Elucifer and took his life. He had promised Duke that he would merely watch. But I didn't matter.")

In the present, former Imperial knight Yuri Lowell goes on a mission to retrieve his neighborhood's blastia core from a nobleman when their reservoir fails. While on his mission, he encounters a noble woman called Estelle, and flees with her from the capital in pursuit of the blastia thief. On their journey, they also meet Karol, a trainee hunter separated from his guild; a blastia researcher named Rita; Raven, a Great War veteran; Judith, a Krytia who seeks to destroy the blastia harming the aer balance; and exclusive to the PS3 version only, seemingly the descendant of a legendary pirate Aifread named Patty Fleur. Together, the group recover the stolen core from a corrupt guild leader and return it to Yuri's friend and former fellow knight Flynn. Yuri and Karol then decide to form an independent guild called Brave Vesperia. Shortly after this, Estelle is attacked by an Entelexeia called Phaeroh, who accuses her of poisoning the planet. After investigating and meeting a second time with Phaeroh, Brave Vesperia learn that Estelle is a Child of the Full Moon, capable of converting aer into magic without the aid of a blastia core, and that her actions are causing the aer krene, the sources of aer, to overproduce aer with deadly results. (Note: "Phaeroh: The power of the Child of the Full Moon stimulates the aer krene more than any blastia. / Yuri: Huh? / Rita: Blastia convert aer into energy by way of a formula. So if Estelle can use her healing artes without the aid of any blastia... She must possess a formula in her very being that lets her convert aer into energy. Judith was looking for blastia that used a particular kind of formula. So...this special formula Estelle has must also consume massive amounts of aer... Which causes the aer krene to become more active and pump out more aer than they should. [...] / Phaeroh: It is as she has said... With each use of her power, the Child of the Full Moon uses far more aer than the blastia... In so doing, the imbalance of aer in this world is furthered. For the planet, such an existence can only be called a poison.") Alongside these events, Yuri sees that the Imperial authorities are powerless to act against powerful figures involved in blastia abuse: he takes matters into his own hands and murders two officials connected to the abuses. These acts put a strain on his friendship with Flynn. (Note: "Yuri: The laws have always been the tools of whoever happens to hold all the chips. / Flynn: Just saying that doesn't make it right for individuals to judge right from wrong, or for you to operate your own private court of law! If the laws are at fault, then fixing those laws comes first. It's for that very reason that I'm still with the Imperial Knights! / Yuri: But you can't deny that lives were saved because those bastards were put down. You'd rather tell those people, 'Sorry you have to die today. I promise we'll change things soon'? / Flynn: That's not what I'm saying at all! / Yuri: They're out there, you know. People so bad they'll just go on hurting others. What can the average person do but be victimized by people like that? You know it was the same way with our people in the lower quarter. / Flynn: Even so, Yuri, what you're doing isn't right. Do you intend to rain your justice down on all the villains of the world? That's the behavior of a common criminal. / Yuri: I recognize it for what it is, and I've made my choices. Murder is a crime. / Flynn: And even knowing that, you intend to dirty your hands.")

After this, Estelle is kidnapped by Raven, revealed to be an agent of Commandant Alexei, leader of the Knights and the mastermind behind the blastia thefts: Alexei intends to use Estelle's power and the replica of a magical sword to activate an ancient weapon called the Enduring Shrine of Zaude and remake the world, erasing the harmful blastia. After Raven decides to remain with Brave Vesperia after helping Estelle to escape with them, the group travel to Zaude to stop Alexei. They fail, and as Zaude is activated, it is revealed to be a barrier generator which kept the Adephagos sealed off from the world. (Note: "Raven: The Adephagos?! Did you use that much aer? / Alexei: No. This catastrophe has always waited there. / Karol: Wh-what do you mean? / Judith: The Adephagos was never eliminated. It was just sealed off far from sight. [...] / Rita: You mean Zaude has been holding it back this entire time?!") As the Adephagos is released, Alexei is killed as Zaude collapses and Yuri is separated from the group after one of Flynn's subordinates attempts to kill him without Flynn's knowledge. Rescued by Duke, Yuri decides to stop the Adephagos. During his absence, Rita discovers a means of converting blastia cores into spirits, which can process aer into a less-dangerous alternate energy called mana, stabilizing the aer krene and keeping Estelle's powers in check. In turn, the mana could power a weapon capable of destroying the Adephagos. After receiving permission from the world's leaders to carry out their plan, Brave Vesperia must confront Duke aboard the city-sized weapon Tarqaron. Duke intends to convert all of human life, including himself, into energy to power the weapon and destroy the Adephagos, returning the world to a more primal state of being. (Note: "Yuri: Duke, we have the four elemental spirits. Their power can counter the Adephagos. / Estelle: There's no need to use people to destroy the Adephagos. [...] / Duke: ...And will the world return to its former state? [...] Will the aer be controlled by the Entelexeia? Will all life be returned to a time when nature ruled? / Rita: No. / Duke: You are changing this world-our Terca Lumireis-for what? For the convenience of humans. Nothing more.") While they share some goals, they are forced to fight due to their conflicting methods. (Note: "Duke: We are in contradiction... ...However our feelings for the world are no different. How odd. / Yuri: No, it's not. The future we chose...what we saw for the future...is different.") After defeating Duke, Yuri attempts to use the converted blastia energy against Adephagos, but it proves insufficient. Moved by Brave Vesperia's efforts, Duke provides the extra power and Adephagos is destroyed. The Entelexeia that formed the Adephagos are then converted into spirits to revitalize the planet. (Note: "Estelle: Spirits. / Karol: You mean all of them? Awesome... / Rita: All the Entelexeia who became Adephagos... They all transformed into these spirits. / Raven: So the Adephagos was also a part of this world. Unbelievable.") A post-credits scene shows Brave Vesperia continuing their adventures and helping the world adjust to life without blastia.

== Development ==
Preliminary work for Tales of Vesperia began in 2005 during the later development stages of Tales of the Abyss, which released that year. Due to the success of Abyss, Vesperia was initially planned as a title for the PlayStation 2. However, upon seeing the projected lifespan of sixth-generation consoles, the executives at Namco Bandai informed the team that Abyss would be the last Tales title of that generation. In addition to this, the team felt limited by the previous generation's hardware. In response, they decided to make the next flagship installment on next-generation hardware. At the time when a platform was chosen, the PlayStation 3 had yet to be shown to the company and the Xbox 360 was highly popular in the west, so they settled on the latter. Being on that platform, the team were also able to make use of Xbox Live, enabling achievements and online ranking implementation. During areas of development, the team were in communication with Microsoft about how to best utilize the platform. Full development began in May 2006, taking approximately two years to complete. The development team, dubbed "Team Symphonia", was the same group that developed Abyss and the 2003 entry Tales of Symphonia. While designing the battle system, the team drew inspiration from the version used in Abyss.

During the early production phases, the team was torn between a cel-shaded anime or realistic style of art direction: they eventually settled on an anime style and production went fairly smoothly from there on. The shaders for the characters were designed using the game's drawing engine, as opposed to the hand-drawn shaders of characters in Abyss. The game's director Yoshito Higuchi originally wanted a realistic feel after the cartoon-like styling and shader techniques of Abyss and the Wii spin-off title Tales of Symphonia: Dawn of the New World. One of the challenges this presented for the background designers was adjusting for the advent of LCD televisions. The positive aspect of this was that more colors could be displayed than on cathode ray tubes. In hindsight, it was felt that the final effect lacked the desired polish. The anime cutscenes were created by Production I.G, with the number and length increasing from previous titles.

The scenario was written by Takashi Hasegawa, who had written for multiple series entries since Tales of Eternia; Koki Matsumoto, who had written the scenario of Tales of Legendia; Hideo Baba, who had previously done work on Tales of Rebirth; and Takaaki Okuda, a newcomer to the series. The game's title, meant to be indicative of the games' theme of justice, was derived from "Vesper", a name referring to the planet Venus. Its general meaning was to depict the protagonists and their ship as a newly born star shining on the land, similar to Venus in the evening sky. The logo was also design to convey this, and the term "Vesperia" was used in-game for the party's airship. The game's main protagonist, Yuri Lowell, was created to be a more mature, evolved protagonist than Kyle Dunamis in Tales of Destiny 2 or Luke fon Fabre in Abyss. His role was to facilitate the growth of the other characters, and to have a sense of justice that did not take account of the law. Veteran Tales character designer, Kōsuke Fujishima, was brought in to design the main characters. Fujishima found designing Yuri difficult, while Flynn proved one of the easiest designs. One of the intentions for Flynn and Yuri was for their designs to contrast with each other. A main character not designed by Fujishima was Repede, who was designed by the art director Daigo Okumura.

=== Music ===
The music was composed by Motoi Sakuraba, who had composed for nearly all the previous Tales games, and his regular partner Shinji Tamura, the latter working under the alias Hibiki Aoyama. While creating the soundtrack, Sakuraba was caught in the transition between sequenced to prerecorded streamed music, the latter of which gave room for rearrangements and improvisation mid-production. Sequenced music had been used up to Abyss, so it was the first time in the series that Sakuraba used this method, although he had done so for all his other projects at the time. For some tracks, a heavy piano element was used, with Sakuraba playing the instrument. Tamura worked with Sakuraba to create different feelings for the various tracks: character themes were melodic, dungeon themes were given a simple and minimalist mood, while town themes struck a balance between these two approaches. In addition to original tracks, three remixed tracks from other Namco Bandai Games were included.

The game's theme song, "Ring a Bell / Kane o Narashite", was sung by Japanese singer-songwriter Bonnie Pink, and was the first theme song to be shared by both the Japanese and western versions of a Tales game with the English version used in the Western release and the Japanese version used in the Japanese release. The song's subject matter, inspired by the game's story and themes, focused on deep friendship between men, and by extension love between men and women. Bonnie Pink was chosen by the producers after a long period of internal consultation. They contacted Warner Music Japan, Bonnie Park's label company, fairly early in the game's production, and discussed the theme song's connection to the story at great length. Bonnie Pink was also chosen as part of the team's plans for an international release, as they wanted to create an English version of the song for the Western release. Bonnie both wrote the original lyrics and translated them into English. Arrangements of "Ring a Bell / Kane o Narashite" are used in some tracks in the main soundtrack, but the song itself is not included on the soundtrack album.

== Release ==
Vesperia was first announced in December 2007 at that year's Jump Festa for a 2008 release in Japan, although its planned platform was not revealed. The game's characteristic genre name, a recurring feature for the series representative of the game's theme, is "RPG to Enforce Justice" (正義を貫くＲＰＧ, Seigi o tsuranukitōsu RPG). It represents Yuri's feelings and personal goals. It was announced for a 2008 overseas release on Xbox 360 in February 2008. It was later confirmed that it would release for that platform in Japan. In a first for the series, the team wanted to have a simultaneous worldwide release for the title, and so were developing the localized version alongside the original. This process proved exhausting. The team were able to make the skits, the game's extra conversation pieces, fully voice in the western version, which they were not able to do for Abyss or Symphonia because of time constraints. The translation was done by 8-4, and dubbed by Cup of Tea Productions.

The game released in Japan on August 7, 2008. Alongside the standard release, the game was packaged with an Xbox 360 Premium Edition. The game released in North America on August 26, just under three weeks after its Japanese release. In July, a demo for the game was released via Xbox Live. Along with the standard edition, a Special Edition bundled with a CD featuring selected music from previous games was released to celebrate the series' tenth anniversary in the west. The European release, which came nearly a year after the game's North American release, was distributed through Atari. The game released in Europe on June 26, 2009. The game was released in Australia on June 25, 2009.

=== PlayStation 3 port ===
A port of the game for the PlayStation 3 was announced in April 2009. The port features full voice acting, containing nearly twice as much voice work as the original voice script, which covers previously unvoiced cutscenes in the 360 version. The game also features various new characters, has Flynn as a permanent playable character, and adds a new playable character in the form of Patty Fleur. Development on the port began in 2008, after the release of the original version. Speaking on why the port was being developed, a developer who worked on Vampire Rain said that companies like Namco Bandai first developed for the Xbox 360 due to superior funding and development support when compared to Sony, then ported to PS3 with minimal effort so they could recoup development costs and add features that needed to be cut from the original game.

The port was released on September 17, 2009. It was later re-released as part of Sony's budget series release on August 2, 2012. Speaking in January 2010, Namco Bandai announced that they had no plans to release the port overseas. Later that year, Yuri's English voice actor Troy Baker said that he had been recording new English dialogue for the PS3 port. A report from a Namco Bandai employee sparked speculation that the reason behind the lack of a localization was due to a deal with Microsoft to keep the game as an Xbox 360 exclusive in western territories. Later, she retracted this statement, apologizing for creating false impressions. Series producer Hideo Baba later said that the main factor in this decision was the strain put on the team with the simultaneous release of the original, meaning a Japan-exclusive release was chosen to lessen the burden. This also coincided with poor marketing feedback for the series in western territories.

=== Definitive Edition ===
A remastered version, Tales of Vesperia: Definitive Edition, known in Japan and Asia as Tales of Vesperia Remaster (Note: テイルズ オブ ヴェスペリア REMASTER(リマスター), Teiruzu Obu Vesuperia Rimasutā), was announced at E3 2018 for Nintendo Switch, PlayStation 4, Windows via Steam, and Xbox One. Designed to celebrate the game's tenth anniversary, Definitive Edition includes upscaled graphics, all content from the Japan-exclusive PS3 version, and English and Japanese voice tracks. Some members of the English voice cast, including Troy Baker, were not asked to reprise their roles for Definitive Edition, with different actors voicing their characters for new content. Definitive Edition was released on January 11, 2019.

== Reception ==
Reception

Aggregate scores
Aggregator	Score
Metacritic	X360: 79/100; NS: 83/100; PC: 80/100; PS4: 81/100; XONE: 80/100
OpenCritic	88% recommend(Definitive Edition) (Note: Based on 99 reviews.)

Review scores
Publication	Score
1Up.com	B+
4Players	87/100
Destructoid	8/10
Easy Allies	8.5/10
Edge	8/10
Eurogamer	8/10
Famitsu	X360: 35/40; PS3: 35/40
Game Informer	7.5/10
GamePro	85/100
GameSpot	8.5/10
GameSpy	4/5
Hardcore Gamer	4/5
IGN	8.2/10
Nintendo Life	8/10
Nintendo World Report	9/10
PlayStation Official Magazine – UK	8/10
Official Xbox Magazine (US)	8.5/10
RPGFan	X360: 89% PS3: 91% NS: 85%

=== Critical reception ===
The game garnered a generally positive reception, according to review aggregator website Metacritic. In IGN's Best of 2008 awards, Vesperia was nominated for Best RPG and Best Original Score in the Xbox 360 category. In GameSpot's own similar awards, it was nominated for awards in the "Special Achievement - Best Story" and "Special Achievement - Best Graphics, Artistic" categories. The year after its release, Technology Tell cited it as one of the best Tales games to have come overseas. During the 12th Annual Interactive Achievement Awards, the Academy of Interactive Arts & Sciences nominated Tales of Vesperia for "Role-Playing Game of the Year", but lost to Fallout 3.

Famitsu gave the game a strong review, with one reviewer calling it "[one] of the most outstanding games in the series", giving it a Platinum award and giving it the highest score out of the games reviewed in that edition of the magazine. Eurogamer's Simon Parkin said that, while lacking the big-budget look of other JRPG series and sticking to many of the genre's conventions, "Namco is to be applauded for updating the series with no small amount of consideration and flair, an effort that has resulted in the strongest entry to the aging series yet". Edge praised the cast's strength and the battle system, saying that the development team's focus in other areas was what made the game enjoyable and easy to play. Andrew Fitch, writing for 1UP.com, greatly enjoyed the technical improvement over Abyss and enjoyed the battle system and other elements including some mature plot elements, but noted translation issues in the English script and a lack of end-game content. As part of his review, he called it "perhaps the finest franchise entry to date". Matt Miller of Game Informer was less positive than most other reviewers, finding the story and gameplay lacking while appreciating the graphical polish.

IGN's Ryan Geddes called it "a strong anime-style Japanese RPG", generally citing the game as an enjoyable experience. Francesca Reyes, writing for Official Xbox Magazine, found some aspects of the battle system frustrating, but stated that most other aspects of the game made up for this deficiency. Kevin VanOrd of GameSpot was positive overall, despite noting a lack of strategy in a lot of battles and similarity to previous Tales games. Hardcore Gamer's Steve Hannley called the game a good starting point for the series on then-current consoles. RPGFan's Ashton Liu said that, while it stood as perhaps the best entry in the series, he also noted that it had not evolved very much mechanically when compared to other RPG series. GameSpy's Gabe Graziani cited it as a graphical improvement over other JRPGs on the console, and praised the characters despite citing the story as being conventional, and called it "[a] superior blend of style and production value".

Famitsu gave the PS3 port a positive review, noting its expanded content when compared to the original and sharing many sentiments with their original review. Japanese gaming website 4Gamer.net recommended the PS3 port to both veterans of the series and to newcomers, and positively noting its expanded content. James Quentin Clark, reviewing the port for RPGFan, said that the added features had made Vesperia the best JRPG of its console generation. In conclusion, he called it "the most complete package game in the series and a must-have for fans of action RPGs".

=== Sales ===
In its debut week, Vesperia reached #4 in Famitsu's sales charts, selling around 120,000 units. An alternate assessment by Media Create placed the game at #4 with sales of 108,000 units. The game helped boost sales of its console in Japan: sales rose to just under 25,000 over roughly 5,000 during the previous week, doubling the console's sales when compared to the PS3. By the beginning of 2009, the game had sold just over 161,000, reaching #82 in Famitsu's list of 100 top-selling games of 2008. It was also the only Xbox 360 game to appear in the list. As of April 2010, the game's Japanese sales have reached 204,305 units for the Xbox 360. This makes it the second best-selling Xbox 360 game in Japan, behind Star Ocean: The Last Hope and ahead of Blue Dragon.

In North America, Vesperia sold 33,000 copies during the 4 days after its launch. In its debut week, the Premium and Standard editions were placed first and second in North American sales charts. In the United Kingdom, it debuted at #35 in the country's gaming charts. According to Namco Bandai's fiscal report for that financial year, the game sold a combined total of 410,000 units in the United States and Europe, becoming the company's third best-selling title in that period. Combined, the Xbox 360 version sold 614,305 units worldwide.

During its first day on sale, the PS3 port sold 140,000 units, more than the first month's sales of the original version and nearly equal to its lifetime sales at the time. The port sold 407,000 units by September 2011, making it one of the better-selling Tales games on PlayStation consoles at the time. The budget series release of the port sold a further 7,229 units in its first week, and eventually sold 57,717 units. In total, the PS3 version has sold 465,888 units in Japan.

In February 2019, Bandai Namco announced via the Japanese Tales account that Tales of Vesperia: Definitive Edition shipments have surpassed 500,000 units worldwide. As of 2021, Definitive Edition sold over 1.5 million units worldwide. Combined, all versions of the game collectively sold a total of over 2.8 million units worldwide. (Note: Tales of Vesperia sales: Xbox 360 (Japan) – 204,305; Xbox 360 (United States and Europe) – 410,000; PS3 (Japan) – 465,888; Definitive Edition – 1,500,000+)

== Media adaptations ==
In October 2009, an anime film titled Tales of Vesperia: The First Strike was released in Japanese cinemas, roughly coinciding with the release of the PS3 version of the game. The anime is prequel to the game showing Yuri Lowell's time as an Imperial Knight. It was released as a Blu-ray/DVD bundle in Japan with downloadable content for the PS3 version in May 2010. The game was also released in Japan on Universal Media Disc. An English localization of the anime was released on Blu-ray and DVD in 2012. Speaking in 2009 after the theatrical release of The First Strike, Makoto Yoshizumi, the publishing general manager for Namco Bandai, said that there was a possibility of sequels to both Tales of Vesperia and The First Strike, but as yet nothing has materialized.

Tales of Vesperia spawned five manga adaptations: one specially produced anthology collection, one traditional adaptation, one yonkoma titled Tales of Vesperia Four Panels Kings, (Note: テイルズオブヴェスペリア4コマKINGS, Teiruzu Obu Vesuperia 4-koma KINGS) an adaptation of the last segment of the game titled Tales of Vesperia: Trajectory of Venus, (Note: テイルズ オブ ヴェスペリア 明星たちの軌跡, Teiruzu Obu Vesuperia Myōjō-tachi no Kiseki) and an adaptation of The First Strike. Ichijinsha was the publisher for all but Trajectory of Venus, which was published by ASCII Media Works. Three novel adaptations have also been made: a four-part novelization of the game, a four-part series focusing on Raven titled Tales of Vesperia: Mask of the Void, (Note: テイルズ オブ ヴェスペリア 虚空の仮面, Teiruzu Obu Vesuperia Kokū no Kamen) and a two-part series focusing on Judith titled Tales of Vesperia: Silence of the Errand Dragon. (Note: テイルズ オブ ヴェスペリア 竜使いの沈黙, Teiruzu Obu Vesuperia Ryū Tsukai no Chinmoku) An episodic audio novel adaptation following Yuri and Flynn's childhood, Tales of Vesperia: Genealogy of the Condemned, began release on Android and iOS in April 2014. Multiple CD dramas have also been produced: these include an audio adaptation of Vesperia, comic dramas focused around Brave Vesperia, a prequel to Mask of the Void, and a prequel to The First Strike.
