= Tales of the Abyss =

2005 video game

- North American PlayStation 2 version cover art
- Developer: Namco Tales Studio
- Publishers: JP: Namco; NA/PAL: Namco Bandai Games
- Director: Yoshito Higuchi
- Producer: Makoto Yoshizumi
- Artist: Kōsuke Fujishima
- Writer: Takumi Miyajima
- Composers: Motoi Sakuraba; Shinji Tamura; Motoo Fujiwara
- Series: Tales
- Platforms: PlayStation 2, Nintendo 3DS
- Release: PlayStation 2: JP: December 15, 2005; NA: October 10, 2006; Nintendo 3DS: JP: June 30, 2011; AU: November 24, 2011; EU: November 25, 2011; NA: February 14, 2012
- Genre: Action role-playing game
- Modes: Single-player, multiplayer

Tales of the Abyss (Note: Tales of the Abyss (Japanese: テイルズ オブ ジ アビス, Hepburn: Teiruzu Obu Ji Abisu)) is an action role-playing game developed by Namco Tales Studio. It is the eighth main title in their Tales series and was released in celebration of the series' 10th anniversary. Originally released for the PlayStation 2, the game was published by Namco in Japan in December 2005, and Bandai Namco Games in North America in October 2006. Its development team included director Yoshito Higuchi, producer Makoto Yoshizumi, and character artist Kōsuke Fujishima. The game features music by series composers Motoi Sakuraba and Shinji Tamura, and includes the opening theme song "Karma" by Bump of Chicken, which is replaced with the instrumental version in the western release, due to licensing issues. Namco has given Tales of the Abyss the characteristic genre name To Know the Meaning of One's Birth RPG (Note: To Know the Meaning of One's Birth RPG (生まれた意味を知るRPG, Umareta Imi o Shiru RPG)). A port for the Nintendo 3DS handheld was released in Japan in June 2011, followed by an Australian and European release in November 2011 and a North American release in February 2012.

Taking place in a fantasy world, the story focuses on Luke fon Fabre, a young swordsman whose pampered life turns upside down when he unwittingly becomes the target of a military-religious organization known as the Order of Lorelei, who believe him to be the key to an ancient prophecy. Together with his companions, Luke attempts to discover the truth and significance of his own birth, as well as unravel the mystery of The Score, the prophecy that has bound humanity's actions for thousands of years.

Reviews for both its original console and handheld releases were mostly positive, with critics praising the title's combat system yet remarking that the game's plot had a tendency to move slowly and adhered to many stock Japanese role-playing game conventions. The PlayStation 2 version has sold approximately 734,000 copies worldwide. A 26-episode anime adaptation by BN Pictures was also produced, which first aired in Japan on MBS between October 2008 and March 2009.

== Gameplay ==
=== Battle system ===
Luke performing his Fang Blade

The game's "Flex Range Linear Motion Battle System" (FR-LMBS) is real-time. The game controls are very similar to other Tales games, especially Tales of Symphonia, except with increased maneuverability. The player can attack, defend, perform a skill or call up a menu with multiple functions, such as using items or commanding an ally to perform an action. This system offers multiplayer co-op battles, and the camera for this mode is improved over the one found in Tales of Symphonia, zooming out as characters move away from each other so that other players are now always on screen. A new feature, "Free Run", allows the player character to run in any direction, unlike previous Tales games.

The game features many skills and spells to unleash upon enemies. Characters can learn "AD Skills", which can be equipped and unequipped at will, to help them in battles. The game features a large number of these skills, acquired through the use of "Capacity Cores" – items that give stat bonuses when a character levels up. Once a certain statistic has a large enough bonus, the AD skill is learned automatically. A new addition to the system is the "Field of Fonons" (often abbreviated as FOF). Whenever a character uses a spell or battle technique that features an elemental alignment, a circle will appear on the ground, corresponding to that element. After being reinforced with more techniques of the same element, the circle will light up in that element's color to signify that an FOF change is available. Finally, if a character stands in the circle and performs a specific skill that corresponds with the FOF circle, the skill will be upgraded into a more powerful version. Enemies can also use and create FOF fields. As with other Tales games, characters can engage in "Over Limit" mode when their green OVL bar is full. This can be filled by completing combos and making critical hits. During Over Limit, characters can use their Mystic Artes (Hi-Ougis), powerful skills that can only be performed when certain conditions are fulfilled. Every character has one standard Mystic Arte, along with an additional hidden one unlockable only on repeat plays. Enemy boss characters have Mystic Artes as well.

=== Recurring features ===
Many recurring features in the Tales series return, such as skits, grade, cooking, and titles. Skits are short conversations that may be viewed when prompted. During a skit, anime-style faces of the characters taking part in the skit appear and interact with each other.

"Grade" is awarded after each battle, either raising or lowering the player's total number of points depending on how the battle was played. For example, defeating the enemies within a short period of time or getting a large combo will increase the grade awarded; characters being killed or having negative status effects on them will lower the grade acquired. At the end of the game, players can use earned Grade to purchase bonuses for the next playthrough.

Abyss also features a cooking system. The player collects recipes and ingredients throughout the game, and can use them to cook either after battles or between battles. Unlike Tales of Symphonia, up to four different recipes can be set to the control pad for use after battle. Different recipes require different items and have different effects. The player can increase characters' cooking stats for each recipe by having them cook the recipe frequently.

Abyss features titles which each character gains through a series of tasks or events. Titles have various effects, some of which are stat-related. In the tradition of newer Tales games, some of these titles also change costumes. Each character has unique costumes; to acquire additional costumes, the player must accomplish certain tasks. Unlike some other Tales games, every title in Tales of the Abyss carries a special effect, varying from discounts in shops to recovering small amounts of HP periodically.

== Plot ==
=== Setting ===
Tales of the Abyss takes place on Auldrant, a planet composed of elementary particles called "Fonons". For much of Auldrant's history, only six fonons were known to exist, representing the elements of Shadow, Earth, Wind, Water, Fire and Light; but eventually a seventh fonon, controlling Sound, is discovered. Its discovery brings great chaos: using this newest Seventh Fonon allows one to read the future. One such Seventh Fonist, Yulia Jue, an important religious figure in the game, puts in place a future for the world for thousands of years to come, with the promise of unlimited prosperity at its end. This prophecy of the future's set path becomes known as the "Score" and is documented on "Fonstones" scattered throughout the world. The nations of Kimlasca-Lanvaldear and Malkuth have fought over the fragments of these tablets for generations, each uncovering them and hoping to discover the future before the other. Meanwhile, a holy order emerges dedicated to the reading of the Score and the keeping of the peace. This "Order of Lorelei" is headed by a Fon Master and maintains both religious/political and military branches. Finally, the Score and its promise of prosperity lead to a dangerous complacency within the general population of Auldrant; the slaughter of an entire people living on the island of Hod and the destruction of that landmass was countenanced because it was predicted in the Score.

=== Characters ===
The game primarily follows Luke fon Fabre, a teenage son of the Kimlasca King's sister who has suffered from amnesia ever since he was kidnapped seven years prior. He encounters Tear Grants, a member of the Order of Lorelei who seeks the death of her brother, Luke's teacher Van Grants. As Luke and Tear meet and return to Kimlasca, they meet several other characters including Jade Curtiss from the Malkuth military forces, Fon Master Ion from Daath and his guardian Anise. They are also joined by Kimlasca's Guy Cecil, Luke's servant and best friend, and Princess Natalia, Luke's fiance. Acting as an anti-hero in the game is Asch the Bloody.

Along with Van, major antagonists of the game include: Mohs, a Score-devoted leader of the Order. In addition, there are the 6 God-Generals of the Order including: Legretta, Tear's former master with undying loyalty to Van; Arietta, a general who took a rivalry against the party after they killed the animals that raised her; Dist, a mad scientist with ties to Jade; Sync, a mysterious masked strategist; and Largo, the leader of the Oracle's shock troops.

=== Story ===
Luke fon Fabre is a teenager who has been held in his manor for years by his uncle, the King of Kimlasca-Lanvaldear, after being kidnapped and started suffering amnesia. As Luke's teacher and the Commandant of the Oracle Knight, Van, has to leave to search for the Fon Master Ion, a proud woman known as Tear Grants tries to kill Van. As Luke intervenes, the Seventh Fonons in the two individuals' bodies react causing a hyperresonance, a reaction that sends the two flying to a land faraway. Tear then decides to escort Luke back to the manor in Kimlasca-Lanvaldear. However, the duo finds themselves in Malkuth. The two meet Fon Master Ion as well as Colonel Jade Curtiss from the Malkuth forces, who informs them of an impending war. Jade requires Luke's status as a noble to convince the King of Kimlasca to stop his forces and prevent the war.

As Luke's group heads back to Kimlasca, they are aided by Fon Master Guardian Anise and Luke's servant Guy Cecil. Luke learns that Tear is Van's younger sister, who suspects Van of scheming to threaten the world. They also encounter the members from the Oracle Knights with one of them, Asch, sharing an extreme resemblance to Luke. In Kimlasca, Luke, Jade and Ion inform the King of their worries. Luke is then made an ambassador and is sent to Akzeriuth to help the people who are being poisoned by miasma. Van tells Luke he can neutralize the miasma by using his own hyperresonance which the King has been aware of to use him as a weapon. Luke decides to follow his master's plan. However, in Akzeriuth the hyperresonance destroys the land's Sephiroth tree, making the entire town be consumed by the miasma.

Blaming Luke for his actions, Asch also reveals Luke is the result of fomicry, a replica based on the real Luke fon Fabre: Asch. As Luke's friends abandon him for what he did to Akzeriuth, Luke starts detesting his current form and makes a promise to Tear to change for the best. He then starts working with Jade to protect the people of St. Binah whose town is also collapsing like Akzeriuth. In order to prevent more of these collapses, the group takes advantage of Luke's hyperresonance skills to move the land to the subarea, the Qliphoth. In the meantime, they are opposed by Van's forces except Asch who is against his master's wishes of a new world populated by replicas in order to go against the score. After making a peace treaty between Kimlasca and Malkuth, Luke's group defeats Van who falls to the Planet's Core.

A month after Van's defeat and moving the world population to the Qliphoth, the miasma starts affecting mankind. Additionally, a large number of replicas start appearing. Luke and Asch learn from the spirit of the Seventh Fonon, Lorelei, that Van has survived and took it. Grand Maestro Mohs from the Order of Lorelei forces Ion to read the Planet Score, killing him in the process. Mohs then forms the New Order of Lorelei with the Oracle Knights who are awaiting Van's return. Jade reveals that the miasma can be neutralized through a hyperresonance that sacrifices a large amount of lives. The replicas offer themselves in exchange that the rest of their kind are given home. Luke offers himself to perform the hyperresonance and although the plan is a success, Luke is left with little time to live.

The group then heads to confront the New Order of Lorelei who wish to follow Van's will. In confronting the remaining God Generals, Asch dies while helping Luke to reach Van. The group defeats Van who had sealed Lorelei inside his right arm and kill him. As the area starts collapsing, Luke decides to stay behind to free Lorelei. Two years later, he reappears to meet Tear and the rest of his friends.

== Development ==
The first mention of Tales of the Abyss occurred when Namco filed a trademark for the game in December 2004, and first formally announced the title in an August 2005 issue of Weekly Shōnen Jump magazine, where the company also announced that the title would be released in celebration of the series' tenth anniversary. The first gameplay trailer was featured on a pre-order bonus DVD included with Tales of Legendia released later that month, which also revealed that the game would be developed by the same team that produced Tales of Symphonia for the GameCube and PlayStation 2, including producer Makoto Yoshidumi and character designer Kōsuke Fujishima. In April 2006, four months after the game's Japanese release, Namco Bandai Games announced that Tales of the Abyss would be headed to North America the following fall, and would later showcase the game at the 2006 Electronic Entertainment Expo in Los Angeles in June.

The game was directed by Yoshito Higuchi who also acted as director of Tales of Symphonia and previously served on the development team of Namco's fighting game franchises Tekken and Soulcalibur. Abyss's Free Run battle system was originally designed for Symphonia and implemented in the middle of development, but was removed due to possible player exploitation of the game's enemy AI making battle too easy. This problem was avoided in Abyss by designing the battle system around this feature from the beginning. The "Field of Fonons" (FOF) feature was added to supplement the Free Run system, with Higuchi stating that "we needed to have battle positioning play a more important role if we wanted players to use Free Run at all", with the concept becoming more streamlined as development when on. The North American version of Tales of the Abyss includes new Mystic Arte attacks for most of the main characters not seen in the original Japanese release, but also removed all spoken dialogue from the optional skit cutscenes, translating only the text.

=== Nintendo 3DS port ===
The 3DS port of Tales of the Abyss was first announced in September 2010 during Nintendo of Japan's "Nintendo Conference" press event, along with a tentative release date of spring 2011. The following April, Namco Bandai announced that the 3DS port for Japan had been delayed and would miss its originally intended deadline, with a commercial release eventually coming the following June. In May 2011, Namco Bandai confirmed a North American release alongside Tales of Graces F for some time later that year. A European release was confirmed a few days later for a spring 2012 time-frame, which also marked the first official release of the game in the region. Namco's European branch would later feature the game at the 2011 Gamescom event in Germany.

The port made use of the handheld's 3D and dual screen capabilities, including the ability to register combat skills on the bottom screen for quick access, which is replaced by a world map while outside battle. Artist Kousuke Fujishima, who had worked on the previous version of the game, provided a new title logo graphic and promotional character art for the release. In addition, the Japanese version includes the new Mystic Arte attacks added to the original North American PlayStation 2 version.

=== Audio ===
The music for Tales of the Abyss was mostly composed by series veterans Motoi Sakuraba and Shinji Tamura. The Japanese version features the theme song "Karma" (カルマ, Karuma) by J-Rock group Bump of Chicken, with group's lead vocalist, Motoo Fujiwara, also providing compositions for certain songs in the game that later appeared on his album Song for Tales of the Abyss. "Karma" was also used as the opening theme of the anime adaptation. The western version uses the instrumental version of the theme song, due to licensing rights. The incidental vocal theme performed by Tear throughout the game, "Fu Uta" (譜歌, Tone Song), was sung by Yukana.

A commercial soundtrack was released in Japan in March 2006 by King Records featuring 115 tracks across four discs. A number of radio drama albums featuring the Japanese voice cast were also produced by Frontier Works, including a five-volume set titled Drama CD Tales of the Abyss (ドラマCD テイルズオブ ジ アビス, Dorama CD Teiruzu Obu Ji Abisu) released between September 2006 and February 2008, and a two-volume set called Anthology Drama CD Tales of the Abyss (アンソロジードラマCD テイルズ オブ ジ アビス, Ansorojī Dorama CD Teiruzu Obu Ji Abisu) released in July and August 2008.

== Reception ==
Reception

Aggregate score
Aggregator	Score	
Aggregator	3DS	PS2
Metacritic	75/100	78/100

Review scores
Publication	Score	
Publication	3DS	PS2
Electronic Gaming Monthly	N/A	7.33/10
Eurogamer	8/10	N/A
Famitsu	31/40	36/40
Game Informer	6.75/10	7.25/10
GamePro	N/A	4.25/5
GameSpot	7/10	7.9/10
GameSpy	N/A	4/5
GameTrailers	N/A	8.3/10
GameZone	N/A	7.8/10
IGN	7/10	8.3/10
Nintendo Power	7/10	N/A
Official U.S. PlayStation Magazine	N/A	5/10

=== PlayStation 2 version ===
Tales of the Abyss was well received in Japan, with Weekly Famitsu magazine awarding it a 36 out of 40 based on individual scores of 9, 9, 9, and 9, which earned it the publication's Platinum Award, and was later ranked 44th in a Famitsu reader poll of the 100 greatest games of all time in March 2006. The game would go on to sell 440,225 copies in the region by the end of 2005, becoming the 23rd most-bought software title that year, and over 556,000 copies in Japan by the end of 2006, with worldwide sales totaling approximately 734,000 copies by December 2007.

Overall, English reviews for the game became "favorable" according to video game review aggregator Metacritic. The game has been praised for its diverse cast with IGN particularly placing attention on the game's protagonist and his ensuing character development. Others likewise praised the game's dialogue and cut-scene direction, although some questioned both the overabundance of "skits" which popped up from time to time as well as the localization team's decision to omit the voice-acting that accompanied the skits in the Japanese version. Most reviewers praised the battle system, stating that it was an improvement from earlier Tales installments while at the same time noting that it often devolved into "mindless button mashing". The graphics have received mixed attention. In particular, 1UP.com felt that they were "rough around the edges" and GameSpot pointed out a drop in frame-rate on the world map, along with a generic mix of RPG locales.

=== 3DS version ===
Famitsu granted the 3DS version a lower score than its predecessor based on individual reviews of 8, 8, 7, and 8, primarily due to the lack of new features compared to the original, with one editor remarking that "It's well-made and doesn't feel old, but there also hasn't been much added to it, although touch-screen skill selection on the bottom screen is nice." It would enter the Japanese sales charts as the top-selling game of its debut week with 74,173 copies sold, and would go on to sell a total of 126,808 copies in the region by the end of 2011.

The Nintendo 3DS port also received "favorable" reviews, though slightly less than the PS2 original, according to Metacritic. GameSpot called the game "entertaining" and "engrossing", but felt that it was not well-suited to the handheld's stereoscopic 3D, remarking that "for those who have already played the game on the PS2, it's harder to recommend a repeat purchase when the central new feature actively makes the game worse." While IGN praised the fact that the portable title had not lost any features from the console version, they nonetheless felt that the title "hasn't aged well in all respects," adding that "Having fallen in love with games like Xenoblade Chronicles and Dragon Quest IX in the past few years, it's difficult to return to this complex world of menus and jargon without a bit of reluctance." Game Informer called the game a "well-executed port", but ultimately felt that the story moved too slowly and adhered to too many stock "JRPG" conventions. In 2012, the magazine would name Jade and Tear among the best characters in the Tales series. That same year, Nintendo Power would name the 3DS version the 228th greatest game released for a Nintendo console in their farewell issue.

Although exact numbers were not disclosed, a representative from Namco Bandai stated that sales of the game in Europe exceeded the company's expectations, and had to reprint the title "three or four times" to meet demand. The success of Tales of the Abyss in the region encouraged the publisher to reconsider their western markets and potentially localize more Tales games in the future.

== Adaptations ==
=== Anime ===
Tales of the Abyss
- テイルズ オブ ジ アビス
- Genre: Adventure, Fantasy
- Created by: Namco Bandai Games
- Developed by: Akemi Omode
- Directed by: Kenji Kodama
- Music by: Motoi Sakuraba
- Country of origin: Japan
- Original language: Japanese
- No. of episodes: 26 (list of episodes)

Production
- Executive producers: Masayuki Ozaki; Satoshi Kubo; Makoto Yoshizumi
- Producers: Naohiro Ogata; Yuto Kuwazono; Yoshinori Higuchi; Hiroo Maruyama
- Production companies: Sunrise (Note: As of 2015, the copyright for this work was transferred to BN Pictures.); Bandai Visual; Namco Bandai Games; Mainichi Broadcasting System

Original release
- Network: Tokyo MX, MBS, CBC, BS11, Animax
- Release: October 4, 2008 – March 28, 2009

A 26-episode animated TV adaptation of Tales of the Abyss, produced by Bandai Visual, Namco Bandai Games and Sunrise began airing on October 4, 2008, and ended its run on March 28, 2009. The episodes were directed by Kenji Kodama and written by Akemi Omode. The game's theme song, "Karma" by Bump of Chicken, was reused as the opening theme; most of the voice actors from the game also reprised their roles.

On July 22, 2010, Anime News Network announced that the North American anime distributor Bandai Entertainment acquired the license to the Tales of the Abyss anime. Originally set to release on July 7, 2011, it was later delayed to October 11, 2011. Following the closure of Bandai Entertainment in 2012, Sunrise USA announced at their panel at Otakon 2013, that Funimation (later known as Crunchyroll) has rescued the series, along with a handful of other former Bandai Entertainment titles.

On August 1, 2026, Discotek Media announced at Otakon they had rescued the Tales of the Abyss anime series for a North American Blu-ray release in 2026.

=== Manga ===
Three manga adaptations of the Tales of the Abyss game have been created and released in Japan. The first, which is simply named Tales of the Abyss and is written and illustrated by Rei was serialized in Dengeki Maoh. The second, Tales of the Abyss: Asch The Bloody, written by Rin Nijō and illustrated Hana Saitō ran in the official Tales of Magazine. A third manga adaptation, Tales of the Abyss: Jade in My Memories (Tales of the Abyss -Tsuioku no Jade-) was written by newer artist Ayumi Kano and is a side story piece focusing on character Jade Curtiss' background. The first chapter premiered in Asuka magazine's April 24, 2009 issue.
