= Honne =

Honne or Hönne may refer to:

- Honne and tatemae, Japanese words that describe the contrast between a person's true feelings and desires, and the behavior and opinions one displays in public
- Hönne, a river in Germany
- Honne (band), an English electronic music duo
- Honne (tree), a tree that grows in southern India
- Yasuyuki Honne (born 1971), Japanese video game designer
