= Baten Kaitos: Eternal Wings and the Lost Ocean =

2003 video game

- North American GameCube box art featuring the protagonist Kalas
- Developers: Monolith Soft tri-Crescendo
- Publishers: WW: Namco; NA: Namco Hometek; WW: Bandai Namco Entertainment (Switch, PC)
- Directors: Yasuyuki Honne; Hiroya Hatsushiba
- Producer: Tadashi Nomura
- Artists: Nakaba Higurashi; Shinji Noguchi; Yasuyuki Honne
- Writer: Masato Kato
- Composer: Motoi Sakuraba
- Platforms: GameCube; Nintendo Switch; Windows
- Release: GameCube: JP: December 5, 2003; NA: November 16, 2004; PAL: April 1, 2005; Nintendo Switch: WW: September 15, 2023; Windows: WW: June 18, 2024
- Genre: Role-playing
- Mode: Single-player

Baten Kaitos: Eternal Wings and the Lost Ocean (Note: Baten Kaitos: Eternal Wings and the Lost Ocean (バテン・カイトス 終わらない翼と失われた海, Baten Kaitosu Owaranai Tsubasa to Ushinawareta Umi) in Japan) is a role-playing video game developed by Monolith Soft and tri-Crescendo and published by Namco for the GameCube. It was released in Japan in 2003, North America in 2004 and PAL territories in 2005. The player assumes the role of a "guardian spirit" – an unseen player avatar – who guides protagonist Kalas and his party of companions in an adventure across an aerial floating island-based kingdom in the clouds. The game is focused around the concept of "Magnus" – magical cards that capture the "essence" of items found in the in-game world. The concept is used as a plot device, for in-game item management, and as a basis for the card-themed battle system. The game was noted for its unique battle system, which included aspects of turn-based and action-based battle systems, collectible card games, and poker.

Developed specifically for the GameCube due to its lack of JRPGs in its game library, the game was generally well received by critics, but received lukewarm sales. Despite this, a prequel, Baten Kaitos Origins was green-lit and released at the end of the GameCube's lifespan by Nintendo, receiving a similar reception itself. Outside of the cancelled Baten Kaitos DS and Baten Kaitos 3 concepts, no further entries have been announced or released, with the team largely focusing on other projects, like the Xenoblade games. In the years following, Monolith Soft staff have mentioned the desire to return to the series should the opportunity ever arise. A collection containing both released titles, Baten Kaitos I & II HD Remaster was released on the Nintendo Switch in 2023, and on Windows through Steam the following year.

== Gameplay ==
Baten Kaitos plays as a Japanese role-playing video game. However, the player does not directly play as the game's protagonist as in most JRPGs, but rather, as a self-named "guardian spirit" that directly interacts with the protagonist through preset text dialogue tree response options. At times, characters will address the player and ask questions, giving the sensation of breaking the fourth wall. Answering questions in a rational manner that mirrors the respective character's mindset strengthens their "bonds", which in turn awards benefits in the game's battle system. Outside of this indirect way of advising and guiding the flow of the game, the game plays as a traditional RPG, with the player directing characters in the exploration of a game world and in combat against opponents in battles.

The game's mechanics rely heavily on magical cards known as "Magnus", which absorb the essence of real-world objects for storage and later use, acting as a container for items, as a sense of inventory management. Some objects are already found in their card form, while others are found and needed to extracted into blanks Magnus cards. Over 1,000 different Magnus exist in the game. Magnus are used in a multitude of ways; Magnus containing food or medicine may be used to heal or temporarily invigorate characters, Magnus containing weapons or armor may be equipped to strengthen characters, Magnus containing battle moves may be put into the players deck and used as attacks in battles, and Magnus may be used to interact with non-playable characters to reveal new conversations or complete various quests. Magnus change automatically in real-time as well, for better and worse; a Magnus containing milk that would heal the player may eventually curdle into cheese, which may heal the character even more, or a Magnus containing a ripe banana may turn into a rotten banana, which would in turn hurt the character if consumed. Additionally, a camera Magnus may be used in battle to take photographs of enemies, which can in turn be sold for varying amounts of money, based on picture quality and rarity of image captured.

Gameplay screenshot

Prior to a battle, the player must assemble a deck of Magnus for each party member to be used during combat, from which random hands are dealt from during battle. Battles are both turn-based and action-based; each character has both an offensive and defensive turn, where they have a brief number of seconds to quickly play a limited number of cards from their pre-build deck. Weapon cards are used to fight with, armor cards to defend with, and effect cards cause different effects, such as healing. Each Magnus has a spirit number in the corner ranging from 1–9; playing same-number groupings or numbers used in gradual succession (1-2-3-4) result in an increased damage effect; cards with multiple numbers allow for the player to select the more beneficial option. Magnus can also be combined during battle, and when certain Magnus are played, special combos are formed that create new Magnus. For example, playing the healing cards cucumber and honey combine to create a much stronger healing effect through the creation of a honey dew melon card. Additionally, character-specific "finishing move" Magnus may be found over the course of the game, their use leading to especially powerful attacks.

Experience points are accumulated by winning battles, but may only be applied to a character upon visiting blue flowers across the world, which teleports the party to a church, where one may "pray" to apply the experience points. Doing so allows the player to "level up", leading an increase in the character's primary attributes such as health points, attack strength, or defensive ability, or occasionally "class up" which increases the character's magnus deck capacity.

== Synopsis ==
=== Setting and characters ===
The world of Baten Kaitos is centered around magic cards called "Magnus", which allows humanity to store the essence of objects or powers in them for later use. In the ancient times prior to the game's events, an evil god Malpercio invades the planet and sucks all of the water out of the ocean. Legendary heroes eventually seal his power away with the five all-powerful "End Magnus", but the planet itself is left uninhabitable, leaving humanity to migrate and live among the floating continents in the sky. Overtime, this causes humans to evolve and grow wings, allowing for limited flight.

The player assumes the role of a player-named, unseen "guardian spirit" who directly communicates with and guides Kalas, the game's protagonist. Kalas is considered a bit of a hooligan, and an outcast due to only having one wing, with the other being replaced by a mechanical wing. He travels the world to seek revenge for the death of his grandfather and his little brother. Eventually, his priorities shift when he meets and travels with a young woman named Xelha, and accidentally releases one of the five End Magnus, loosening the seal on Malpercio. The two travel to prevent the corrupt Alfard Empire from fully releasing Malpercio again, eventually joining up with several teammates along the way: Gibari, a laid-back fisherman from a small seaside town; Lyude, the ethical son of a powerful family in the heart of the Alfard Empire; Savyna, a skillful ex-mercenary; and Mizuti, a strange masked creature from unknown origins.

=== Plot ===
Kalas, in his travels to avenge the death of his grandfather and brother, joins Xelha, a good-willed but naive traveler. Together, they inadvertently release the first of the "End Magnus", which is quickly seized by members of the Alfard Empire, a hostile nation on one of the islands. The two chase after them to the Empire's capital, stopping at Diadem along the way, where they meet and team up with Gibari, a fisherman, and Lyude, the Empire's ambassador to the Diadem. Upon arrival, they learn there are five End Magnus in total, and the Empire wishes to locate all five of them, which together, will unseal the power of the evil god Malpercio. The party begins an unsuccessful effort to obtain the End Magus to keep them away from the Empire. One is found in Diadem, but is stolen from them immediately. They travel to Anuenue, where they team up with Savyna, an ex-mercenary from the Empire, but are stopped from obtaining an End Magnus by the Empire's emperor, Geldoblame.

They travel to Mira, Kalas's home nation, where they meet Mizuti, a strange masked being who joins the group. A temporary arrest for being suspected of kidnapping Miran resident Lady Melodia causes them again to lose the only End Magnus they had obtained there. The group escapes to Alfard to stop Geldoblame, but in the confrontation, it is revealed that Kalas had secretly been working for Melodia all along to find the End Magnus and revive Malpercio for her benefit. Melodia takes control of the Empire from Geldoblame, and his former soldiers drive him to the depths of Alfard's Lava Caves. Kalas absorbs the power of the five End Magnus and falls under Malpercio's control. The other members are captured and imprisoned, though Xelha escapes and frees them. They travel to Wazn, an island covered in snow, where they learn that Xelha is its queen. She obtains the Ocean Mirror, which allows Xelha to restore Kalas's free will. Malpercio and Melodia refuge themselves into Cor Hydrae, an ancient fortress also unsealed by the five End Magnus.

Kalas, guilty over his deception, vows to reseal Malpercio. Mizuti directs the group to her homeland, a village in the lands below the Taintclouds, a poisonous layer of gas below the floating islands. They venture down to seek the power of the "Sword of the Heavens" to aid their quest; however, Malpercio and Melodia show up, and the two sides clash. The party is able to ward them off, but the Sword of Heavens is broken in the process. The party then learns of one last hope of stopping Melodia and Malpercio: the Magnus of Life. Kalas learns the truth about his origins; Kalas's scientist grandfather, Georg, under the direction of Emperor Geldoblame, used this power to artificially create life – namely Kalas and his brother, Fee. Geldoblame felt Kalas was too human and only had one wing, so he ordered his death. Georg instead faked his death by blowing up his laboratory, and secretly fled to Mira with Kalas and Fee. Because he was created by the Magnus of Life, however, Kalas can use its power, though he does not yet know how to tap into it.

The party breaks through into Cor Hydrae for a final showdown with Malpercio and Melodia. Malpercio is defeated, Melodia receives free will again, and Kalas, Melodia, and the Guardian Spirit use their powers to release Malpercio's spirit from his body. The energy needed to break the shield around Cor Hydrae drains the energy that allows the five major floating islands to float in the sky, and the islands fall toward the Earth below. However, the planet has now become habitable again, and with the help of the five ancient gods, the islands safely fall into place on the planet as continents. While the general population celebrates a bright new future, Xelha privately confides to Kalas that she is an ancient ice queen, and that her death is required in order to restore the oceans of water necessary for humanity to exist again on the planet. A final battle with Geldoblame ensues, and Kalas and Xelha defeat him, but the battle uses the last of Xelha's strength and she dies in Kalas's arms just after confessing her love. All over the world, a rain begins to fall, accumulating into the long-lost ocean. With resolution found, it is deemed time for the "guardian spirit" to leave, with Kalas and the others congregating to say their goodbyes. The guardian spirit sticks around just long enough to see a local boy give Kalas a pendant Xelha had worn throughout the game, saying that he can hear Xelha's voice in it; Kalas puts it up to his ear, and Xelha reappears in a flash of water.

== Development ==
The game's developer, Monolith Soft, was initially founded in October 1999 after its founder, Tetsuya Takahashi, left his previous employer, Squaresoft, after the company refused to green-light funding for a second entry of Takahashi's first major project, Xenogears. Frustrated, Takahashi decided to start his own company, alongside other Squaresoft employees who had previously worked on Xenogears, Chrono Trigger, and Chrono Cross, to further work on the Xeno series. Takahashi started the company through funding from Japanese company Namco, leading them into an ownership role. However, unable to directly continue Xenogears due to Squaresoft still owning the rights to 'it, the company's main focus became to create Takahashi's spiritual successor, the Xenosaga series. Once the company was fully established and staffed, the company decided to start up a secondary project, driven primarily by their younger staff.

The game's initial concept was created in 2001, with development beginning six months later. Monolith Soft, at the time only really known for the Xenosaga games, clarified after its announcement that while they would be utilizing their development experience from creating said games, the game would not have any actual connection to the Xenosaga series. The GameCube was chosen as the game's platform due to the general lack of JRPGs in its game library; the team wanted to offer a "true RPG" for the userbase, and eventually establish it as a franchise for the system. It was named Baten Kaitos after the star of the same name in the Cetus constellation; the name was chosen to be symbolic of rich nature and the grand world view the team aimed to depict with the game, and as an "anti-Xenosaga" game, which instead a space opera. The game was co-developed by Tri-Crescendo, and was the company's first venture into full-fledged video game development, previously only dealing with music and sound in video games. Both Monolith Soft and Tri-Crescendo had recently sent similar game pitches to Namco, leading Namco to suggest the two companies work together. Tri-Crescendo was primarily responsible for the game's battle system and sound design. Game development approximately consisted of a staff of about 50 people over the course of an 18-month time period, leading to a cumulative 2 years process from inception to finish.

The game's story was written by Masato Kato, a prior Squaresoft staff member who had left the company around the same time many of other people had left to form Monolith Soft. He was selected because he having experience working with many team members, such as artist and game design director Yasuyuki Honne, on past projects like Chrono Cross and Xenogears, and for his ability to "write passionate dialogue that doesn't sound weird or embarrassing". Many aspects of the game were set very early on in developments, such as the game's setting of the floating islands and having an action theme to the battle. Smaller details of the game were vastly changed over time; the kingdom of Mira originally was envisioned by Honne as "a weird place" outside of the scope of the main game, for the player to go for unrelated events when "the story events got too heavy", but Kato reworked it into its final state in the game as an integral part of the story. Similarly, while the Alfard Empire always existed in the game, its original form was a very small, desolate island rather than a large powerful nation. The game was primarily developed to have 3D character models moving over 2D hand drawn art for the game's general world, to increase the level of detail that could be shown onscreen with the GameCube's processing power. Honne wished to experiment with other art styles as well, including an entirely 2D segment with 8-bit graphics. Many experiments ensued, though he couldn't figure out how to do it in a meaningful way until he was able to persuade Namco to allow the use of their Tower of Druaga license for the level. Some of the game's sidequests, such as "Quzman's family tree" and the "star map" originated from submissions from the development team after they polled the team for ideas. The team worked with Robot Communications for the opening full motion video (FMV); the game was initially going to have many short videos interspersed throughout the game, but due to budgetary restraints, they decided it would be best to focus on making one large video at the beginning, explaining why the opening video contains so many spoilers upon first viewing.

The game was always designed to have six playable characters, 3 playable at a time, and between 40 and 50 key non-playable characters, feeling that anymore than that was taxing on the system's hardware, and made it difficult to programm all the different possibilities that can occur in-game. Honne noted that Kalas was most difficult to design, in balancing his wings, cape, and generally garish clothing, which they felt were necessary for his personality. Xelha initially wore a mini-skirt, but this was later changed to pants to better meet the game's Middle Eastern theme and her generally active nature. Lyude was initially intended to be more of a coward, but that aspect of his character was removed, as they had a hard time reconciling that trait with his battle animations. Kato insisted that the character Mizuti speak with a certain accent, to the point that he sat in on her, and only her, voice acting recording sessions. Main characters were generally given a central color in their design, to help identify them from a distance. Early character designs initially had larger, anime-styled eyes, but more realistic eye proportions were eventually given to better meld with the 3D character designs, and to better appeal to Western markets. In Japan, a bonus disc containing a playable version of The Tower of Druaga was offered as a pre-order incentive for the game.

"Vitriolic a Stroke"
One of Baten Kaitos's boss music tracks.

The soundtrack was composed and arranged by Motoi Sakuraba, with Sakuraba personally performing on every track. Over sixty songs were created for the game. He noted the song's opening theme was particularly difficult to create, as the accompanying video has so many frequently changes and movements that needed to be synced with it. The soundtrack album was published by Team Entertainment on December 17, 2003.

=== Baten Kaitos I & II HD Remaster ===
In a February 2023 Nintendo Direct, an HD Remaster of the game, Baten Kaitos I & II HD Remaster, was announced for the Nintendo Switch for release in mid-2023. The release bundles Baten Kaitos and Baten Kaitos Origins (originally released as Baten Kaitos 2 in Japan) together as one release. The remaster does not add or remove any story content from either title, although it only features Japanese voice acting; the English voice acting has been removed. The game features improved graphics and resolution, widescreen display, and a stabilized framerate of 30 frames per second. New features include new options to alter the battle system, including eliminating random battles, an "auto-battle" function, a "1 hit kill" option, and a simplified, faster post-battle results screen. Other new features include two new game plus options that allow the player to retain materials from a prior playthrough or set up new restrictions to make a second playthrough more difficult, the ability to skip cutscenes, an auto-saving feature, and the ability to speed up both battles or general gameplay by up to 3 times the original speed.

== Reception ==
Reception

Aggregate score
| Aggregator | Score |
|---|---|
| Metacritic | 80 (48 reviews) |

Review scores
| Publication | Score |
|---|---|
| 1Up.com | C+ |
| Famitsu | 31 of 40 |
| Game Informer | 8.75 of 10 |
| GamePro | 4 of 5 |
| GameRevolution | 4/5 |
| GameSpot | 8.5 out of 10 |
| GameSpy | 3.5/5 |
| GamesRadar+ | 4.5/5 |
| IGN | 8.8 out of 10 |

The game was generally well received by professional critics. At Metacritic, which assigns a normalized rating out of 100 to reviews from mainstream critics, the game has an average score of 80 out of 100, which indicates "generally favorable reviews" based on 48 reviews. Game Informer praised the game's level of immersion created through the game's graphics and music, stating that "the world feels alive. The colorful graphics depict storybook settings teeming with movement, complete with swaying leaves and moving clouds. I felt like a child with a picture book, all of the substance and subtlety falling by the wayside in the face of breathtaking environments, slick character designs, and terrifying creatures" and calling the soundtrack "amazing" and "a masterpiece". GameSpot agreed with the notion, stating that it was " a beautiful game with a captivating world, a unique art style and... a great place to go for a nice fairy tale". Game Revolution singled out the game's card-based battle system as a stand-out quality in the game, praising the combination of collectible card games, poker-based moves, and action based combat; concluding that "it becomes quite obvious that the developers put a tremendous amount of time and energy into it. The unique combat is very addictive and a welcome aspect to the RPG genre." IGN similarly praised the game's graphics and battle system, concluding that "Monolith Software has crafted a beautiful and thoroughly engrossing game filled with great characters, impressive visuals and solid combat." GamePro praised the freedom given to the player through the game's many side-quests and ability to avoid random battles. Despite the overall praise, 1Up.com and Game Informer criticized the game's storyline and poor voice acting.

Baten Kaitos received a runner-up position in GameSpot's 2004 "Best Role-playing Game" award category across all platforms, losing to Paper Mario: The Thousand-Year Door.

== Legacy ==
=== Impact and other releases ===
While the game was generally well-received critically, it did not reach commercial expectations. Publisher Namco had set a sales-goal of 500,000 copies sold worldwide, and initial sales figures fell well-short of it; it had sold only 80,000 copies in Japan after 2 weeks, and only 161,000 copies in North America after its first month and a half on the market. It also sold poorly in comparison to Tales of Symphonia, Namco's other JRPG released along the same time period for the GameCube; which had sold 290,000 copies in Japan, and 285,000 copies in North America. Namco's senior executive officer Youichi Haraguchi stated that the company feared that the title has not fit well with the GameCube's userbase at the time. Despite this, the game was still considered to have accumulated a "cult following" in the years following its release.

The game was initially created in hopes of making it a franchise, although after its Japanese release, any future releases were described as "undecided" by Monolith Soft. Initially, the only other releases came in the form of two separate novelizations of the game released in Japan; Baten Kaitos: The Destruction of Truth and the Lie of the Promise (Note: Baten Kaitos: Shinjitsu no Hakai to Yakusoku no Uso in Japanese) and Baten Kaitos: Castle of Storms. (Note: Baten Kaitos: Arashi no Shiro in Japanese) However, work on a video game followup was eventually green-lit; in September 2005, a direct prequel, Baten Kaitos Origins, was announced. It was released late in the GameCube's life-cycle in 2006, garnering a similar critical and commercial reception as the original.

=== Cancelled entries Baten Kaitos DS and Baten Kaitos 3 ===
Prior to Origins release, in December 2004, another title, Baten Kaitos DS, was on Nintendo's list of upcoming games scheduled for their then-upcoming Nintendo DS platform, alongside a Xenosaga DS. While the Xenosaga title was later released as Xenosaga I & II, the Baten Kaitos DS title was never further detailed, and later disappeared from Namco's own list of upcoming games in October 2005. In August 2006, when Monolith Soft's president was questioned about the title, responded that the team was "strongly willing to develop [it]", but that questions on the project needed to be directed to their publisher, Namco. A Namco representative further clarified that "The Baten Kaitos DS project has been stopped once. Further development is currently undecided at this point." A month later, Monolith Soft producer Mirohide Sugiura offered a similar response stating that, "The plan for a DS version [was] currently pending, and [they were] awaiting direction from the publisher." The game was not mentioned further by either company outside of a brief listing almost immediately taken down on Namco's Japanese website in 2008, and is generally not believed to be in production.

In 2011, Eurogamer published a report of a number game titles rumored to be in development, including a Baten Kaitos 3 being in development for the Nintendo 3DS. The game, with the subtitle Silence of the Mechanized Son, was said to feature leaked promotional artwork featuring a blue haired male character with a mechanized wing, and was thought to feature a continuation of Kalas's story from the original game. The report mentioned a 2011 Tokyo Game Show reveal, and while many of the rumored titles surfaced, a Baten Kaitos title did not. In 2018, Honne revealed that a Baten Kaitos 3 had entered pre-production planning shortly after the conclusion of development on Origins/2, though his details differed greatly from the 3DS reports. The game never entered production, but game design documents and concept art had been created. Honne notes the planning happened while Monolith Soft was still owned by Namco Bandai, and talks on creating the game ended due to the circumstances of Nintendo purchasing Monolith Soft from Namco Bandai. The materials and rights to the game were retained by Namco Bandai, though Honne still recalled some details from memory - the third entry would have featured a female protagonist, would have been created for a home console (not the rumored DS/3DS entries), and that it would have been a large-scale adventure exploring land, sea, and sky of a world. Both Honne and Monolith Soft staff member Kensuke Tsukanaka have shown interest in making a third entry in the series, but that more fan feedback would be required to be directed at Monolith Soft and Bandai Namco.

=== Future ===
The series has largely lain dormant since the release of Origins in 2006. In Nintendo's transition from the GameCube to the Wii video game hardware in 2006, Monolith Soft stated they had no plan to support the Wii with a Baten Kaitos title, instead focusing on other projects, namely what would turn into Disaster: Day of Crisis and Xenoblade Chronicles. Meanwhile, Tri-Crescendo went on to develop and release Eternal Sonata in 2007 for the Xbox 360 (and later PlayStation 3), a project company founder Hiroya Hatsushiba stated was only possible due to the experience of co-developing Baten Kaitos. Monolith Soft employees would continue to mention the games on occasion. In 2008, producer Tadashi Nomura stated that "We [...] are still willing to start developing a new Baten Kaitos when the time is ripe."

In 2010, in an interview, Honne spoke fondly of Baten Kaitos, calling it his favorite game to work on, and then transitioned into a comment about working on a "secret project", in a way that lead some publications to suggest he may be referring to further Baten Kaitos entries. In 2014, the Baten Kaitos Origins music track "The Valedictory Elegy" appeared in Nintendo's cross over video game Super Smash Bros. for Wii U. In 2015, developer Kensuke Tsukanaka revealed in an interview that while the game series was considered for inclusion in the cross over video game Project X Zone, the developers couldn't figure out a way to work it into the game's story. In the same interview, he also stated that while it would be possible to bring back the series, it would require substantial fan feedback encouraging Bandai Namco Entertainment to use the franchise again. Honne later mentioned that a third game did not came to fruition due to Tri-Crescendo's financial troubles and Bandai-Namco's restructuring. Game journalists have expressed desire for sequel, but no further entries have been released to date.

== See also ==
- Ar Nosurge - another fourth-wall breaking JRPG where the player directly interacts as themselves with game characters
