= Blue Dragon: Awakened Shadow =

2009 video game

- North American box art
- Developers: Mistwalker tri-Crescendo
- Publishers: JP/PAL: Namco Bandai Games; NA: D3 Publisher
- Directors: Yoshiharu Miyake; Takeshi Kaneda
- Producers: Hideo Baba; Hiroya Hatsushiba
- Artists: Akira Toriyama; Kaori Tosa
- Composer: Nobuo Uematsu
- Series: Blue Dragon
- Platform: Nintendo DS
- Release: JP: October 8, 2009; NA: May 18, 2010; GER: September 21, 2010; EU: September 24, 2010; AU: September 2010
- Genre: Action role-playing
- Modes: Single-player, multiplayer

Blue Dragon: Awakened Shadow (Note: Japanese: ブルードラゴン 異界の巨獣, Hepburn: Burū Doragon: Ikai no Kyōjū; "Blue Dragon: Great Beast of the Underworld") is an action role-playing video game developed by Mistwalker and tri-Crescendo for the Nintendo DS. It was released by Namco Bandai in Japan in October 2009 and Europe in September 2010 and by D3 Publisher in North America in May 2010.

It is the third and most recent installment in Microsoft's Blue Dragon series, and is the second to be on the Nintendo DS after Blue Dragon Plus. Series creator Hironobu Sakaguchi and character designer Akira Toriyama return from the original game while Hideo Baba, brand manager of the Tales series, is producer.

== Gameplay ==
In contrast to its predecessors, which were a traditional turn-based RPG and a strategy RPG, respectively, Blue Dragon: Awakened Shadow is an action RPG with real time combat. The player is able to explore 3D fields, attack enemies directly as well as call upon shadows.

The game allows the player to customize their character's appearance, such as their gender, hairstyles, eyebrows, eyes, voices, among other traits. Players are able to use their customized characters in multiplayer with two other friends, locally or online. Previous Blue Dragon protagnist Shu and his friends appear as AI controlled party members.

== Reception ==
Reception

Aggregate score
Aggregator	Score
Metacritic	63/100

Review scores
Publication	Score
The A.V. Club	B−
Eurogamer	4/10
Famitsu	31/40
GameSpot	7/10
GameZone	5.5/10
IGN	8/10
Nintendo Life	5/10
Nintendo Power	7.5/10
RPGamer	2/5
RPGFan	80%
Metro	3/10

The game received "mixed" reviews according to the review aggregation website Metacritic. In Japan, Famitsu gave it a score of two eights, one seven, and one eight for a total of 31 out of 40. 1Up.com summarized the magazine's stance on the game as "a solid standard action RPG but not an exceptional game". Famitsu praised the amount of extra content put into the game such as character customization, item synthesis and boss battles, but they noted that with the battles on the lower screen of the DS and the status on the upper screen it may cause some problems for the player. They also noted that there was a large amount of cutscenes in the game which may make the player "feel like a passive viewer at times".
