= Tales of Xillia =

2011 video game

- North American box art
- Developers: Namco Tales Studio; DokiDoki Groove Works Inc. (Remastered)
- Publisher: Namco Bandai Games
- Director: Naoto Miyadera
- Producer: Hideo Baba
- Designer: Yoshimasa Tanaka
- Programmer: Toyokazu Endo
- Artists: Kōsuke Fujishima; Mutsumi Inomata
- Writers: Daisuke Kiga; Naoki Yamamoto; Itsumi Hori; Takashi Hasegawa
- Composer: Motoi Sakuraba
- Series: Tales
- Engine: Unity (Remastered)
- Platforms: PlayStation 3 Tales of Xillia Remastered; Nintendo Switch; PlayStation 5 Windows; Xbox Series X/S
- Release: PlayStation 3: JP: September 8, 2011; NA: August 6, 2013; AU: August 8, 2013; EU: August 9, 2013; Tales of Xillia Remastered; Nintendo Switch, PlayStation 5, Windows, Xbox Series X/S: WW: October 31, 2025
- Genre: Action role-playing
- Modes: Single-player, multiplayer

Tales of Xillia (Note: Japanese: テイルズ オブ エクシリア, Hepburn: Teiruzu Obu Ekushiria) is an action role-playing game released for the PlayStation 3. It is the thirteenth main installment of the Tales series and is developed by Namco Tales Studio with Namco Bandai Games as the publisher. The game was released in Japan on September 7, 2011, and was localized in North America and PAL regions in August 2013. The game takes place in a fictional world called Rieze Maxia where humans and ethereal spirits live in harmony. It follows Jude Mathis and Milla Maxwell who elude government officials after sabotaging a weapon of mass destruction known as the Lance of Kresnik. The plot's central theme is Yuruginaki shinnen no RPG (揺るぎなき信念のRPG, lit. "RPG of Unwavering Convictions").

Tales of Xillia's reception in Japan was highly positive. At the time of its release in Japan, it was the most preordered Tales game in the series and sold half a million copies in a week, before eventually shipping over 1 million copies worldwide. The game also won awards from Sony and Famitsu. The English localization received positive reception for its battle system, neutral to positive reviews for its plot and characters, and criticism for the map designs. A sequel, Tales of Xillia 2, was released in November 2012 in Japan, and in August 2014, in North America and PAL regions.

== Gameplay ==
Tales of Xillia consists primarily of two major areas: the field map and the battle screen. The field map is a realistically scaled 3D environment where the player character traverses and interacts with non-player characters, items, or mob avatars. On the field map, character interactions between the party can also be viewed in the form of a sketch story; these sketch stories are referred to as skits and consist of animated portraits and voice acting. When coming into contact with a mob avatar, the environment switches to the battle screen, a 3D representation of an area in which the player commands the characters in battles against the CPU-controlled mobs.

Tales of Xillia uses the Dual Raid Linear Motion Battle System during battles. From left to right, the bottom screen displays the Linked Artes Gauge, character portraits and status, and the link supporting character.

During battle sequences, the game uses the Dual Raid Linear Motion Battle System, a variation of the Linear Motion Battle used in the Tales series. Four characters from the party are chosen to battle and characters not controlled by a player are controlled by artificial intelligence with instructions set by the players beforehand. The enemy mob's number, appearances, behavior, vary and are dependent on the mob's avatar. Both sides' objective is to deplete the other side's health points (HP) using attacks and skills. When a party member's health falls to zero, the party member faints until revived with items, by a healer, or resting at an inn on the field map; Mobs with zero HP disappear from the arena. Killing all the mobs will yield experience points, items, and allows the player to return to the field map. If all four participating party members are defeated, a game over will occur. Skill and attribute development is based on a system of orbs placed on the nodes of a hexagonal web called the Lilium Orb. When characters level up, they receive GP which can then be allocated to the orbs on the web in a uni-linear path. Each orb activated contains either a new skill or an attribute upgrade.

Battles take place in real-time. Player actions include moving, dashing, standard attacks, and artes; artes are special attacks which consume "Technical Points" (TP), the in-game synonym for magic points. Dashing, standard attacks, and artes usage are also restricted by the "Assault Counter" (AC), a synonym for action points. (Note: Tutorial speech balloon: "Your AC (Assault Counter) shows the number of consecutive attacks you can use. [...] Artes consume both AC and TP (Technical Point) numbers. As long as you have AC and TP left, you can use attacks continuously.") Party members are able to link to each other to perform unified attacks called linked artes. While linked, the supporting partner provides unique abilities to the character, while also increasing the Linked Artes Gauge. When the Linked Artes Gauge is full, the player character can enter Over Limit which gives them immunity to stagger, unlimited AC, and allows them to use linked artes in succession. (Note: Tutorial speech balloon: "Once you have filled all five segments of the Linked Artes Gauge, use a linked arte to go into Over Limit! While in Over Limit, your AC number will not drop and enemy attacks do no stagger you. What's more, you can use as many linked artes as you want!")

== Plot ==
Two millennia ago, humans developed spyrix, a power source which absorbs spirits. In response, the spirit Maxwell gathered humans, who share a symbiotic relationship with spirits, onto an isolated land protected by a barrier; the isolated land became known as Rieze Maxia and the outer lands as Elympios. As spirits are needed to sustain nature, Maxwell waits for the day all humans on Elympios die off before dispelling the barrier. (Note: Maxwell: Two millennia ago, spyrix appeared in the world. Spirits Perished. Nature withered and died. Humans began following the path of annihilation. So I saved all the spirits and animals as I could, and I gathered humans born with the ability to produce mana. It was then I created Rieze Maxia and sealed them all inside it, to provide a haven from the spyrix. The world is an ark that must sail until Elympios falls.) Twenty years prior to the present, an Elympion cruise ship becomes trapped in Rieze Maxia, eventually forming a terrorist group known as Exodus. Exodus works with the Elympios military to find a way to destroy the barrier. In the present era, Rieze Maxia is ruled by two countries called Rashugal and Auj Oule. While the two countries appear to live in harmony, they both initiate black operations in attempts to conquer the other in hopes of uniting Rieze Maxia as a single country.

In the present, medical student Jude Mathis investigates a military research facility in order to search for his missing professor. There he witnesses a spyrix-powered weapon called the Lance of Kresnik absorb his professor. The military prep Jude as the next victim, but he is saved by Milla Maxwell, Maxwell's successor. In response, the military activates the lance which absorbs Milla's spirit companions forcing her and Jude to retreat. (Note: Event List (Secret of the Research Center): "She discovers the Lance of Kresnik, but the girl they defeated before has set a trap for them. Milla loses The Four Great Spirits, but thanks to their quick thinking, Milla and Jude are unharmed. Milla and Jude are able to escape the research center") Jude and Milla decide to confront Rashugal's king who had endorsed the Lance's creation. During their travel, they are joined by Alvin, Elize Lutus, Rowen J. Illbert and Leia Rolando. After Rashugal's king is defeated, Exodus obtains and uses the Lance to temporarily disable the barrier protecting Rieze Maxia, allowing Elympios' army to invade. (Note: Event List (Mounting Anxiety and The Mysterious Voice): "Through Milla's disclosure that Rieze Maxia is covered by a grand arte known as the schism, our heroes learn that these mysterious soldiers come from a separate world named Elympios.") Assisted by Auj Oule's king, Gaius, the party defeats Exodus at the cost of Milla's life. (Note: Event List (An Intention): "Jude tries to stop Milla, who is hell-bent on using the Lance of Kresnik by herself. [...] The Lance of Kresnik repeals the arte. Milla is killed in the collapse of the Zenethra.")

After mourning her death, Jude leads the party to meet Maxwell and attempts to persuade him to dispel the barrier and save Elympios. (Note: Event List (Freedom of Choose): "The party meets the real Maxwell at last on the Temporal Crossroads, the space that connects the human world to the spirit realm. Jude tells Maxwell that the schism should be destroyed. At this, Maxwell flies into a rage, believing that Jude is a traitor who would destroy Rieze Maxia.") Reunited with Milla, who has been reborn as a spirit, they convince Maxwell of their cause. However, Gaius and the spirit named Muzét seal Maxwell within the Lance of Kresnik, intent on sustaining the barrier until all spyrixs are destroyed; Maxwell sends the party to Elympios before he is completely subdued. (Note: Event List (Freedom of Choose): "Maxwell promises to dispel the schism, but he is prevented by Gaius and Muzét. With the help of Maxwell, our heroes are spirited away to Elympios to recoup and find time to retaliate against Gaius and Muzét.") There, the party learns about Elympios' dependence on spyrix and an ongoing research on spyrite, a power source harmless to spirits. (Note: Event List (New Possibilities): "Our heroes learn about spyrite from the rescued Balan. It may be possible to control the spyrite and save both worlds.") With renewed conviction, the party confronts and defeats Gaius and Muzét. Maxwell dispels the barrier and disperses its energy to temporarily power spyrixes until the completion of spyrites. The party returns to their daily lives with Jude joining a spyrite research team, Milla resuming her role as Maxwell, and Gaius uniting Rieze Maxia under his rule.

== Development and release ==
The game began development after Tales of Hearts was completed. A Tales game for the PlayStation 3 was announced on July 28, 2010's Weekly Shonen Jump and officially announced by Namco Bandai Games on August 2, 2010; On December 15, 2010, Tales of Xillia was unveiled in Weekly Shonen Jump and its official website was launched. Its staff, battle system and two main characters were revealed along with the game's main theme, Yuruginaki shinnen no RPG (揺るぎなき信念のRPG, lit. "RPG of Unwavering Convictions"). Between January and March 2011, Namco released information about the other four playable characters. In May the game's release date, a Xillia themed PS3, and the game's theme song, "Progress" by Ayumi Hamasaki were revealed, with the Japanese vocals being retained in the Western release. Before the game's release, a Korean game guide of the game was leaked onto the internet forcing Namco to issue a response. Due to time constraints, some planned features were excluded such as an onsen scene and having Gaius or Muzét as playable characters. The game was released on September 8, 2011, and was made available on the Japanese PlayStation Store a year later. The game was re-released under PlayStation 3 The Best label on October 9, 2014.

The characters were designed by Mutsumi Inomata and Kōsuke Fujishima. They were each given characters which played to their strengths. During development, an old woman design was considered but dropped. For the antagonists, the development team gave them motives that were equally sound to the protagonists. During the development of Tales of Xillia, the developers intended the players to recruit Gaius and antagonist Muzét or vice versa; the idea was dropped due to time constraints. Since both artists had different sizes for their character's anatomy in the concept art, the in-game models were rescaled for consistency.

In March 2012, Tales of Xillia was trademarked in Europe and North America. A Western localization was officially announced by Namco Bandai Games Europe on July 6, 2012, through Twitter. On November 5, 2012, Ted Tsung, the North American producer for Tales of Xillia, announced the completion of the English voice recordings. On the same day, Europe's localization was announced to have subtitles in English, French, Spanish, German, and Italian. In April 2013, Namco announced the game would be released in August for North America and PAL region; also announced was the collector's edition of the game. In North America, the first print of the game were released as a limited edition bundle. The game was translated by 8-4 and dubbed by Cup of Tea Productions. (Note: Ending Credits)

=== Downloadable content ===
Tales of Xillia had several downloadable content (DLC) which changed a character's appearance or provided in-game bonuses such as items, currency, or levels. The majority of the DLC were released weekly between September 8 until October 6, 2011, on the PlayStation Store. Costumes were themed and released in sets; in order of release the sets were, Star Driver, The Idolmaster 2, swimwear, steward and maid, school, and Tales series. Accompanying these costume releases were hair styles, accessories, palette swaps, and in-game bonuses DLC. Two DLC codes were bundled with physical releases: Ayumi Hamasaki's album Five contains Milla's songstress costume; the first print of the game contains a Tales of Phantasia outfit for Jude and a Tales of Destiny outfit for Milla. The final DLC was the Santa Claus costume set and was released on the PlayStation Store on December 1, 2011.

In the English localization, the Tales of Phantasia and Tales of Destiny costumes were given with preorders of the collector's edition; North America's Limited Edition and the PAL region's day one edition also contained the codes. Excluding Star Driver, the Japanese PlayStation Store's contents were released bi-weekly for North America and PAL region between August 6 and September 3, 2013. The final DLC, the Santa Claus costume set, was released on November 26, 2013.

== Media adaptations ==
=== Manga ===
Tales of Xillia spawned four manga adaptions: two anthology collections and two traditional manga series. Ichijinsha were the publishers for the anthology collections. The first anthology collection is Tales of Xillia Yonkoma Kings (Note: Japanese: テイルズ オブ エクシリア 4コマ Kings, Hepburn: Teiruzu Obu Ekushiria Yonkoma Kings). Its two volumes were released on November 25, 2011, and February 25, 2012. The second anthology collection is Tales of Xillia Comic Anthology (Note: テイルズ オブ エクシリア コミックアンソロジー, Teiruzu Obu Ekushiria Komikku Ansorojī). Its three volumes were released between December 24, 2011, and July 25, 2012. The two traditional manga series are Tales of Xillia Side:Jude (Note: テイルズ オブ エクシリア Side:Jude, Teiruzu Obu Ekushiria Side:Jude) by ASCII Media Works and Tales of Xillia Side:Milla (Note: テイルズ オブ エクシリア Side:Milla, Teiruzu Obu Ekushiria Side:Milla) by Media Factory; they are adaptions of the game's storyline and follows one of the two protagonists. The Jude manga has four volumes released between February 2012 and March 2013, while the Milla manga has five volumes between February 2012 and October 2013.

=== Books ===
Shueisha, Yamashita Books, and Enterbrain each published a strategy guide for the game. Tales of Xillia was adapted into a novel series under the same name. It is published by ASCII Media Works and three volumes were released between November 10, 2011, and March 10, 2012. A play diary by Famitsu was published by Enterbrain on December 8, 2011. Tales of Xillia Illustration: Matsumi Inomata X Kōsuke Fujishima's Character Work (Note: テイルズ オブ エクシリア イラストレーションズ いのまたむつみ×藤島康介のキャラクター仕事, Teiruzu Obu Ekushiria Irasutorēshonzu Inomata Mutsumi X Fujishima Kōsuke no Kyarakutā Shigoto) is a book by the game's character designers and was released on December 27, 2011, by Ichijinsha. It provides details on the characters' back story and how their design came to be. On the same day, Tales of Xillia Official World Guidance (Note: テイルズ オブ エクシリア 公式設定資料集, Teiruzu Obu Ekushiria Kōshiki Settei Shiryōshū) was released by Yamashita Books and expands on Tales of Xillia's lore.

=== Audio CDs ===
Five drama CDs based on the game's plot were produced by Frontier Works. DJCD: Talesring Xillia (Note: DJCD「テイルズリング・エクシリア」, DJCD: Teiruzu Ringu Ekushiria) volumes 1 and 2 were released on May 23 and June 20, 2012. Anthology Drama CD: Tales of Xillia (Note: アンソロジードラマCD「テイルズ オブ エクシリア」, Ansorojī Dorama CD: Teiruzu Obu Ekushiria) volumes 1 and 2 were released on September 26 and October 24, 2012. DJCD: Talesring Xillia Comic Market 83 Limited (Note: DJCD 「テイルズリング・エクシリア」 Comic Market 83 Limited, DJCD: Teiruzu Ringu Ekushiria Comic Market 83 Limited) was released on January 26, 2013, in a regular and limited edition. It contains a cameo from Tales of Xillia 2's Ludger Will Kresnik and Elle Mel Marta. Tales of Xillia Original Soundtrack (Note: テイルズ オブ エクシリア オリジナル･サウンドトラック, Teiruzu Obu Ekushiria Orijinaru Saundotorakku) soundtrack was released by Avex Group on September 7, 2011, in a regular and limited edition; it peaked 31st on Oricon's charts.

== Reception ==
Reception

Aggregate scores
Aggregator	Score
GameRankings	77.91%
Metacritic	78/100
OpenCritic	76% recommend(Remaster) (Note: Based on 50 reviews.)

Review scores
Publication	Score
Edge	7/10
Electronic Gaming Monthly	7.5/10
Famitsu	39/40
Game Informer	8.25/10
GameRevolution	4/5
GameSpot	7.0/10
IGN	8/10
Joystiq	4.5/5
PlayStation Official Magazine – UK	6/10
Polygon	7/10

Awards
Publication	Award
PlayStation Awards 2011	Gold Prize
Famitsu Awards	Award of Excellence

At the time of its release in Japan, Tales of Xillia was the most preordered Tales game in the series and sold half a million copies in a week. In North America, Tales of Xillia was one of the top selling games on the PlayStation Network in August 2013. As of December 2013, the game has shipped over 1 million copies worldwide. The game was re-released in Japan under the PlayStation 3 The Best label in 2014.

Due to the amount of sales, Sony awarded Tales of Xillia the Gold Prize during the PlayStation Awards; the game also received the User's Choice award from the PlayStation Awards online poll. Famitsu's review of the game was highly positive; they praised the game for its attentive visuals, accessibility, and fast battle system. In the "Newtype Anime Awards" from 2011, Xillia won the "Game Opening Animation" award. The English localized version of the game was also a nominee for the Satellite Award for Outstanding Role Playing Game in 2013, but lost to Ni no Kuni: Wrath of the White Witch, another game from Bandai Namco Entertainment.

All English reviewers agreed the battle system was fast and engaging; however, Electronic Gaming Monthly, Game Informer, GameSpot, and PlayStation Official Magazine panned the map designs calling them repetitive, lifeless and bland. The plot received neutral to positive reception. Game Revolution wrote "There's a pleasing inertia to the way plotlines form, unfold, and reach a conclusion that propels our heroes ever-forward, never stopping long enough to feel meandering but never feeling rushed or forced either.", praising the narrative to be one of the qualities to the game. Game Informer described the plot as "investing" and liked the balance in tragic and lighthearted moments. Joystiq lauded the execution of the plot for avoiding the usual JRPG "info dumps" and how small plot-lines intertwined into a larger conflict. PlayStation Official Magazine considered the plot as average and called it a let-down compared to the combat system. Reviewers have also noted the dual-protagonist execution caused incoherency in Milla's story.

Reviewers had mixed opinions on the characters. Generally, reviewers liked the character interactions. IGN praised the diverse characters but panned Milla's English voice acting. Game Revolution felt the characters were relatable and agreed with IGN about Milla's voice noting it sounded robotic and forced. Electronic Gaming Monthly described the characters as rather normal and competent compared to the previous Tales games, adding that they could imagine the cast having lives and dreams outside of the party's journey. Edge described the character interactions as engaging, well written, and praised how the characters avoided the cliché found in manga and anime. Oppositely, PlayStation Official Magazine felt the characters "fall into the familiar anime archtypes [sic?]" and that "flat voice acting and a melodramatic script" made it difficult to feel invested in the cast; Polygon agreed about the character archetypes and called it a lazy strategy used to make the characters understandable.

== Notes and references ==
=== Primary references ===
Namco Tales Studio (August 6, 2013). Tales of Xillia (PlayStation 3). Namco Bandai Games.
