= Baten Kaitos Origins =

2006 video game

- North American cover art featuring the protagonist Sagi
- Developers: Monolith Soft tri-Crescendo logicalbeat (HD Remaster)
- Publishers: Nintendo; Bandai Namco Entertainment (HD Remaster)
- Directors: Yasuyuki Honne; Hiroya Hatsushiba
- Producer: Hirohide Sugiura
- Designer: Koh Kojima
- Artist: Yasuyuki Honne
- Writer: Koh Kojima
- Composer: Motoi Sakuraba
- Platforms: GameCube; Nintendo Switch; Windows
- Release: GameCube: JP: February 23, 2006; NA: September 25, 2006; Nintendo Switch: WW: September 15, 2023; Windows: WW: June 18, 2024
- Genre: Role-playing
- Mode: Single-player

Baten Kaitos Origins, released in Japan as Baten Kaitos II, (Note: Full Japanese title: Baten Kaitosu II: Hajimari no Tsubasa to Kamigami no Shishi (バテン・カイトスII 始まりの翼と神々の嗣子; Baten Kaitos II: Beginning of the Wings and the Heir of the Gods)) is a 2006 role-playing video game developed by Monolith Soft and Tri-Crescendo and published by Nintendo for the GameCube. It was released in February 2006 in Japan, and in North America in September 2006. It is a prequel to Baten Kaitos: Eternal Wings and the Lost Ocean (2003). Similar to the first entry, the player assume the role of a "guardian spirit" – an unseen player avatar – who guides protagonist Sagi and his party of companions in an adventure across an aerial floating island-based kingdom in the clouds. The game retains the original's focus around the concept of "Magnus" – magical cards that capture the "essence" of items found in the in-game world, where the concept is still used as a plot device, for in-game item management, and as a basis for the card-themed battle system, albeit with minor tweaks. A remaster was released with its predecessor as Baten Kaitos I & II HD Remaster for the Nintendo Switch on September 15, 2023 and on Windows through Steam on June 18, 2024 by series owner Bandai Namco Entertainment under license from Nintendo.

== Gameplay ==
The game plays as a traditional JRPG and very similarly to the first Baten Kaitos game, albeit with some changes and adjustments. Similar to the original, the player plays the role of a "guardian spirit" that can break the fourth wall to interact with the game party through dialogue options. Outside of this, the player also maneuvers the main character, "Sagi" through the game's environment and battles in the traditional sense. Unlike typical role-playing games, the Baten Kaitos series uses a mechanism where all in-game items are stored in magical cards called "Magnus". Magnus come in two forms - battle and quest. Battle Magnus replace equipment; rather than equipping characters with weapons and armor, battle Magnus are dealt to the player at the start of the battle and then selected as battle commands. Hence, equipment and even attack types exist as cards, rather than as statistics associated with the characters. Quest Magus, on the other hand, are treated like most in-game RPG items, and can be used to interact with the game's environment. For example, if the player wanted to light a torch, they could choose to use a Fire Magnus next to it. Some Magnus change naturally as time progresses (such as a fruit changing from ripe to rotten), while other Magnus may be combined manually using the "Magnus Mixer" to create new, more powerful items. For example, combining "Saber" and "Flame" creates the stronger "Flame Sword". As the game progresses, the player obtains more Magnus to be used and manipulated as needed. In addition to playing through the game's main narrative, many side quests exist as well, including on-going efforts to restore the abandoned village of Sedna.

Gameplay screenshot

The game retains the core battle system from the original game as well, which focuses around the player selecting Magnus cards in specific orders to attack and deplete the health of computer-controlled opponents. Battles are turn based, but have brief time limits in which cards must be selected as well. A key difference is that all characters now use cards from a single deck and play from a single hand, instead of having separate decks as it was in the original Baten Kaitos. Battle Magnus are assigned number value, and playing increasingly higher numbered cards spur combos that increase effectiveness. As the game progresses, the player may add more Magnus into the decks, or organize preset decks that may be set to either active or inactive for use, allowing the player to set up themed decks for specific battles. The game contains no "out of battle" statistics, so there is no need to heal characters after battles. The game does not contain random battles; enemy characters are visible on the field, and the player is able to choose to fight or avoid them.

== Synopsis ==
=== Settings and characters ===
The game is a prequel to the original Baten Kaitos game, taking place in the same fictional world twenty years prior to the events of the first game. While many of the locales are present in an altered form, the game also features several new locales, such as the continent of Hassaleh, and Sedna, a fantastical town made entirely out of clay sculptures. While featuring a new cast of playable characters, younger versions of characters from the original game can be found scattered across the game's world, albeit twenty years younger. The overall theme of the game's world is that of a struggle between "pro-magnation" (the power of hearts, wings of the heart, and magic) and "pro-machination" (mechanical) forces; having many parallels to the modern concept of industrialization. The main race of characters are human-like in nature, but possess bird-like wings on their back that assists in flying in small short bursts. The player plays the role of an unseen guardian spirit who can communicate to Sagi, the main character, who is a "spiriter" - a rare type of person who can communicate with said spirits. Communication is limited to pre-set dialogue tree option selections. Other playable characters include Guillo, a synthetic, puppet-like genderless life form which Sagi has known since childhood, and Milly, a sheltered, runaway young woman who decides to travel with the two.

=== Plot ===
Twenty years prior to the events of the original Baten Kaitos. The main character, Sagi, works for the Alfard Empire in an elite unit, the Dark Service, that reports directly to a powerful politician, Lord Baelheit. Sagi is a spiriter: someone with a connection to an extra-dimensional entity called a Guardian Spirit that provides power and protection. The role of the Guardian Spirit is taken by the player. He is joined by Guillo, a sentient mechanized puppet animated by magic. Their assignment, coming from an unnamed source, is to assassinate Emperor Olgan. However, it is a set-up; a third party kills Olgan and frames Sagi and Guillo for it, requiring them to flee the area. A man named Geldoblame assists them and suggests they meet up with his master, Quaestor Verus, due to Sagi and Verus both being spiriters. They encounter a giant beast called an Umbra, which Guillo has been mysteriously programmed to defeat, and meet up with the third and final member of the party, a young woman named Milly. The three of them work to clear Sagi's name while trying to uncover the nature of the threat causing unrest among Alfard's various power-hungry politicians. They also continue to work under Verus as Verus runs against Baelheit in an election to replace Olgan.

Verus assigns the group to stop Baelheit's efforts at pro-machination, an effort to forcibly mechanize key locations in other nations to boost Baelheit's power and control. Though Sagi's group secure the cooperation of the other nations' leaders, they're unable to contend with the powerful mechanical weapons of Baelheit's Machina Vanguard, ultimately allowing Baelheit to establish footholds in every nation. The group encounters more Umbra on their journey, learning that they are "afterlings", pieces of an ancient, evil god named Malpercio. Whenever an afterling is slain in Sagi's presence, he sees visions of another world, in which a sorcerer named Wiseman pursues "pro-magnation" to turn every being in the world into Magnus. They discover the visions are real scenes from the past, and that Malpercio was not a god, but simply a group of warriors who solicited the help of dark forces to defeat Wiseman.

Sagi learns that he is not actually a spiriter, but a subject in the Empire's "Malideiter Project" experiments to create artificial spiriters by infusing people with pieces of Malpercio's afterlings. The project, ordered by Baelheit on behalf of Olgan, was abandoned after a mishap, but Sagi still lived on with pieces of Malpercio within him. This revelation means the player is not actually a "Guardian Spirit" either, but one of the Malpercio warriors. Sagi coming to terms with the player on this gives him the strength to defeat the Machina Vanguard. Meanwhile, Milly admits she is Baelheit's daughter, sent to spy on the group until she had a change of heart. Baelheit reveals that Milly is half-Machina; when she was just a child, a failed experiment similar to the "Malideiter Project" tore her in half and killed her mother. With the help of his own guardian spirit, Baelheit managed to revive Milly using Machina.

Baelheit wins the election over Verus and becomes Emperor. He completes Tarazed, a huge flying mechanized fortress, and orders everyone to move onto it, as he intends to destroy the continents. Verus orders Sagi to stop Baelheit, and Sagi does so. Verus reveals he has been pulling the strings and using the group for his own corrupt goals. The group defeats him, but this brings Wiseman, who had possessed Verus, out to attack the group. With the aid of the members of Malpercio, Sagi is able to defeat Wiseman, but this leads to Tarazed's collapse. Sagi, Milly and Guillo flee, aided by the previously defeated members of the Machina Vanguard. In the chaos of the fortress's collapse, Guillo sacrifices itself to save Sagi. Sagi and Milly return to Alfard, happily reunite with family and friends, and eventually decide to elope and move to Mira. Geldoblame, as Verus's most loyal devotee, is devastated and driven mad by Verus's betrayal, but discovers that he is now Emperor due to the deaths of Verus and Baelheit's entire cabinet in the destruction of Tarazed. The game's final scenes foreshadow the original Baten Kaitos: Geldoblame, corrupt and fixated on power, instructs his new subjects to locate the five "End Magnus" that have the power to end the world, and announces his intention to work with the scientist Georg. The game ends on a still-frame of a baby with one wing, the same as Kalas in Baten Kaitos, with a note about the story being continued in Baten Kaitos.

== Development and release ==
The original Baten Kaitos was originally conceived as the start of a new series for the relatively newly created Monolith Soft, which up to that point, had largely focused on the company's flagship Xeno series. After a brief period of waiting and seeing how the original performed, and despite underperforming in sales, a follow-up title was quickly green-lit, largely in part of the original's strong critical reception. The game was first announced as Baten Kaitos 2 in September 2005 at the Tokyo Game Show. Despite being a prequel, the game retained its 2 moniker even through its final release in Japan, while being renamed to Origins in its North American release. For its North American release, it was given the Origins subtitle to better indicate it was a prequel, while in Japan, it retained its 2 and was given the subtitle of Baten Kaitos II: Beginning of the Wings and the Heir of the Gods for context.

Development took approximately 18 months with a staff of around 50 employees. Monolith Soft again partnered with tri-Crescendo on the game's development, who again focused on sound and battle direction. The developer's aim was to create a similar experience to the original game, while streamlining, lessening, or removing aspects of it in the process. The game runs on the same game engine as the original, retaining the style of 3D characters over 2D art backgrounds, with fully 3D battles, a format popularized during the original PlayStation's time. The general game flow and battle system was sped up and its combo system revamped and simplified. The originals restrictive leveling up system was scrapped entirely, as is the need to heal characters outside of battle. While the original had over 1,000 collectible "Magnus" cards, Origins was cut down to 655, and no opening CG movie was produced. Yasuyuki Honne returned to direct the game and its art direction. In 2003, Honne had pitched a sequel to the Mother/Earthbound, involving a claymation styled background, to Nintendo; while the project was rejected, the concept was revisited and implemented in a portion of Origins in the magical town of Sedna. Masato Kato, who had previously worked with Honne on Chrono Cross and the original Baten Kaitos as a freelance scenario writer, did not return for Origins, instead being replaced by internal Monolith Soft staffer Koh Kojima. Motoi Sakuraba returned from the original Baten Kaitos to arrange and compose the game's soundtrack; a total of 61 individual tracks of music are included within the game.

Unlike the first Baten Kaitos game, which was published by Namco, Origins was published by Nintendo, and translated and localized by 8-4. While no official reason was given for the change, Nintendo proceeded to buy Monolith Soft from Namco shortly after the completion of the game. Originally planned for release in December 2005 in Japan, it was later delayed several months later to February 2006. The North American version was released six months later in September 2006. Unlike its predecessor, it was not released in Europe. The game's release dates would make it one of the last major titles released for the GameCube, with many Nintendo published titles at the time, such as Super Paper Mario, The Legend of Zelda: Twilight Princess, and Fire Emblem: Radiant Dawn being pushed towards the then-upcoming launch and early lifespan of the Wii instead. Producer Hirohide Sugiura explained that the team was just wrapping up the game's development around the time of the Wii's announcement, and they did not feel it was worth the time or cost to port it to the Wii, with the game's largely traditional control scheme being incongruent with the Wii's new motion-controlled Wii Remote. They felt it made more sense to start with a new game concept for the Wii, which eventually led to the creation and release of action game Disaster: Day of Crisis in 2008. The team did not feel restricted by sticking with the GameCube's then-aging technical hardware limitations; some content was cut, but this was strictly due to time and budget restraints. The North American release had a brief instance of censorship; late in the game features Sagi being crucified on a cross in the Japanese version of the game was changed to him being placed on a golden cube.

=== Baten Kaitos I & II HD Remaster ===
In February 2023 Nintendo Direct, an HD Remaster of the game, Baten Kaitos I & II HD Remaster, was announced for the Nintendo Switch for release in mid-2023. The release bundles the original Baten Kaitos and Baten Kaitos Origins (originally released as Baten Kaitos 2 in Japan) together as one release. The remaster does not add or remove any story content from either title, although it only features Japanese voice acting; the English voice acting has been removed. The game features improved graphics and resolution, widescreen display, and a stabilized framerate of 30 frames per second. New features include new options to alter the battle system, including eliminating random battles, an "auto-battle" function, a "1 hit kill" option, and a simplified, faster post-battle results screen. Other new features include two new game plus options that allow the player to retain materials from a prior playthrough or set up new restrictions to make a second playthrough more difficult, the ability to skip cutscenes, an auto-saving feature, and the ability to speed up both battles or general gameplay by up to 3 times the original speed.

== Reception ==
Reception

Aggregate scores
Aggregator	Score
GameRankings	77% (20 reviews)
Metacritic	75 (21 reviews)

Review scores
Publication	Score
Electronic Gaming Monthly	7, 4.5, 5.5 of 10
Game Informer	7 of 10
GameSpot	7.5 of 10
GamesRadar+	4/5
GameZone	8.2 of 10
IGN	8.3 of 10
Nintendo World Report	8 of 10
PCMag	3.0/5.0
RPGamer	4.0/5.0
RPGFan	88/100
X-Play	3/5
Nintendojo	9.1 of 10

Award
Publication	Award
IGN	Game of the Month, September 2006

The game was generally well received by critics. At Metacritic, it received an average score of 73 out of 100, which indicated "generally favorable reviews", based on 21 reviews. IGN praised the game for being "visually stunning and hold[ing] true to the original" and having "a better story overall", but conceded that one's enjoyment may vary depending on ones ability to overlook some of the shortcomings of tediousness and randomness of the game's battle system. They later described it as "one of the last great gems" on the GameCube, naming it their "Game of the Month" for September 2006. GameSpot and GameZone largely echoed their sentiments - praising the level of content and sidequest and its ability to build off of the original Baten Kaitos, but felt that some could be scared away by the difficulties in battles and grinding involved to advance the game. Conversely, GamesRadar+ cited the battle system as the game's strongest point, stating that the developer's decision to streamline the battle system and have all characters pull cards from the same deck made a world of a difference in making it more fun. The game's translation and localization was praised by many reviewers as well, as was the improvement of quality in the voice acting, which was panned in the prior entry.

Baten Kaitos Origins debuted at number 15 on the weekly games sales charts in Japan, with roughly 14,000 units sold in the first week.

== Legacy ==
To date, Baten Kaitos Origins is the last entry into the Baten Kaitos series. An entry for the Nintendo DS was announced concurrently to Origins, but development was halted and the game was never released. In 2011, Eurogamer published a report of a Baten Kaitos 3 being in development for the Nintendo 3DS. The game, with the subtitle Silence of the Mechanized Son, was said to feature leaked promotional artwork featuring a blue haired male character with a mechanized wing, and was thought to feature a continuation of Kalas's story from the original game. The game was to be revealed at the 3DS event at the 2011 Tokyo Game Show, but while many of the rumored titles surfaced, a Baten Kaitos title did not. In 2018, Honne revealed that a Baten Kaitos 3 had entered pre-production planning shortly after the conclusion of development on Origins/2, though his details differed greatly from the 3DS reports. The game never entered production, but game design documents and concept art was created. Honne notes the planning happened while Monolith Soft was still owned by Bandai Namco, and talks on creating the game ended due to the circumstances of Nintendo purchasing Monolith Soft from Bandai Namco. The materials and rights to the game were retained by Bandai Namco, though Honne still recalled some details from memory - the third entry would have featured a female protagonist, would have been created for a home console (not the rumored DS/3DS entries), and that it would have been a large-scale adventure exploring land, sea, and sky of a world. Both Honne and Monolith Soft staff member "Kensuke Tsukanaka" have shown interest in making a third entry in the series, but said that more fan feedback would have to be directed at Monolith Soft and Bandai Namco.

An arrangement of the battle theme of this game, "The Valedictory Elegy" appears in the 2014 fighting game Super Smash Bros. for Nintendo 3DS and Wii U, composed by Origins composer Motoi Sakuraba. The arrangement also returns for Super Smash Bros. Ultimate, alongside the characters Sagi and Milly both appearing as spirits.
