= Tales of Hearts =

2008 video game

- North American cover to the PlayStation Vita remake, Tales of Hearts R
- Developers: Namco Tales Studio (DS); 7th Chord, Bandai Namco Studios (PSV)
- Publisher: Bandai Namco Games (Note: Published under the Namco brand name in Japan)
- Directors: Naoto Miyadera (DS); Kazuhisa Oomi (DS); Hironori Naoi (PSV)
- Producers: Hideo Baba (DS); Takashi Yota, Mika Murakita (PSV)
- Artist: Mutsumi Inomata
- Writers: Naoki Yamamoto; Keishi Maeda (Hearts R)
- Composers: Motoi Sakuraba; Hiroshi Tamura; Shinji Tamura; Kazuhiro Nakamura (Hearts R)
- Series: Tales
- Platforms: Nintendo DS, PlayStation Vita, iOS
- Release: Nintendo DS: JP: December 18, 2008; PlayStation Vita: JP: March 7, 2013; NA: November 11, 2014; EU: November 14, 2014; iOS: JP: October 9, 2013
- Genre: Action role-playing game
- Mode: Single-player

Tales of Hearts (Note: Tales of Hearts (Japanese: テイルズオブハーツ, Hepburn: Teiruzu Obu Hātsu)) is an action role-playing game released for the Nintendo DS in Japan and the PlayStation Vita worldwide. It is the eleventh main entry in the Tales series, developed by Namco Tales Studio and published by Bandai Namco Games. The Japan-exclusive DS version received two editions: the "Anime Edition," featuring cutscenes by Production I.G, and the "CG Movie Edition," featuring CGI cutscenes created by Shirogumi. A remake of the game, Tales of Hearts R (Note: Tales of Hearts R (テイルズオブハーツ アール, Teiruzu Obu Hātsu Āru)), was released on the Vita in March 2013 and later released in western regions in November 2014. Hearts R was also ported to iOS and released in Japan in October 2013 although it was pulled from the App Store on March 31, 2016, and therefore no longer available for download. Hearts R was developed by 7th Chord and includes staff from Bandai Namco Studios.

The game follows main protagonist Kor Meteor after he discovers a woman named Kohaku Hearts and her brother Hisui near his home town. When Kohaku is attacked by a mysterious antagonist named Incarose and infected by a monster called a xerom, Kor attempts to cure her using his Soma, an ancient weapon designed to fight xerom. In the process, he ends up shattering Kohaku's Spiria, the essence of her heart and emotions, and scattering the pieces across the world. Together with Hisui, Kor sets off with Kohaku on a quest to restore her Spiria. Its characteristic genre name, a concept used extensively in the Tales series, is Kokoro to deau RPG (心と出会うRPG, lit. "A Meeting Between Hearts RPG"). It represents the game's central theme of people's hearts uniting to overcome strife. For Hearts R, extra story scenes were created and the genre name was altered to Aratana kokoro to deau RPG (新たな心と出会うRPG, lit. "A New Meeting Between Hearts RPG").

Hearts began production in the winter of 2006, during the final development stages of the PlayStation 2 remake of Tales of Destiny. It was produced by Hideo Baba, the former brand manager for the series. Though the third title on the DS, it was the first portable title to be developed by Namco Tales Studio. The remake was mostly handled by different development staff, but the writer and character designer both returned to add new content. Both versions of the game have received strong sales and highly positive reviews in Japan, with the DS version selling 260,000 units by 2009. Reviews of the DS version have been positive overall, while western reviews of Hearts R have been mixed to positive.

== Gameplay ==
The battle gameplay from the Nintendo DS version, showing the battle on the top screen and selections on the bottom screen

Like previous entries in the Tales series, Tales of Hearts is an action role-playing game. The game is split into two main areas: the field map and battlefield arenas triggered upon encountering an enemy. The battle arenas are fully rendered and played out in 2D. Characters are rendered outside pre-rendered cutscenes as 2D character sprites against 3D backgrounds. For the original Nintendo DS version, the top screen shows the main visuals, while the bottom screen shows the navigation map and other functions. Battles are triggered by running into enemy sprites rather than appearing as random encounters. As with previous titles, Skits, extra conversations between characters, are available for the player to trigger.

The battle system is a variant on the Linear Motion Battle System (LMBS) from multiple Tales titles: an action-based combat system similar to a fighting game: button commands instantly trigger various attacks and actions, and different attacks string together to form combos. The system used in Hearts is called the "Combination Aerial LMBS". Up to three characters participate in battle, with one controlled by the player and the other two controlled via artificial intelligence. The two AI characters be assigned to perform different actions such as healing or attacking. The "Combination" element refers to a special gauge that fills up and can be used to perform special attacks with party members not assigned in battle. A second "Emotion" gauge determines how many moves a character can perform: the gauge fills while the character is blocking, and is depleted by performing actions. The lower the gauge is, the lower a character's defenses are. Characters can employ special attacks called "Combination Blasters," Hearts' take on the series' staple Mystic Artes ("Hi-Ougis" in the Japanese version). Defeated enemies drop items and materials that can be used to level up character abilities, with certain combinations of items yielding certain abilities and skills. Once enough skills have been learned, a character's weapon can be upgraded via three separate skill trees, with the abilities and power of the character changing according to the choice of skills beforehand.

A battle from the Vita version

For the PlayStation Vita remake, the gameplay takes place in 3D environments with fully rendered character models. Along with including a fourth AI-controlled character in battle, Hearts R uses a redesigned battle system titled the Aerial Chase Linear Motion Battle System (called "Arc Chase" in the Japanese version). The "chase link" mechanic enables a character to follow an enemy after knocking it into the air and continue a combo attack. By selecting an ally at the right moment, the player character can perform a Chase Cross attack, while holding down the attack button activates a finishing move. Multiple items found in chests scattered across the land can be used in battle (such as curative items) and for obstacles and objects in the field areas. Multiple elements from the series, including cooking healing recipes, are included. Random encounters with enemies on the field are also present. Characters level up using Soma Build Points (SBP), with the "soma" being a character's signature weapon and points causing the Soma to evolve, granting new abilities. SBPs are assigned to character stat values called Spir Parameters, which strengthen different character stats. Mystic Artes from the original game are carried over, along with new ones. Also added are Union Artes, special attacks unique to a particular character pairing. Characters can be assigned special accessories called "Combo Commands": activated by a specific set of button presses, the accessory grants a character full access to all their Artes for a limited time.

== Story ==
=== Setting ===
Tales of Hearts is set on the worlds of Organica (Note: Celland in Hearts and the Japanese version of Hearts R) and Minera (Note: Quartzia in Hearts and the Japanese version of Hearts R) (known to Organicans as the "white moon"), with the events of the story mostly taking place on Organica. Two millennia before the present day, Minera was in a state of war with itself, and Organica's inhabitants were used by the Minerans as a food source for organic weapons called xeroms. The xeroms were designed to attack Spirias, the crystalline essence of a person's emotions, and either destroyed them or infected them with an ailment known as despir. Some Minerans who sympathized with the Organicans' plight and wishes for peace provided them with weapons to fight off the xerom, called Soma. (Note: Lithia: Eons ago, the Mineran race flourished, boasting a culture highly skilled in the use of Will artes. But such prosperity led to greed and decadence, and our weak Spirias soon turned against each other. During the course of the unending Will artes war, a weapon was born. / Ines: The xeroms! / Lithia: Yes. Xeroms were engineered to be living weapons that fed off Spirias in order to fuel their monstrous evolutions. Though primitive, you Organicans boasted powerful Spiria, which attracted the attention of we Minerans. / Hisui: So you decided to turn people from our world into xerom chow. / Lithia: We invaded your planet and enslaved your ancestors to power the xeroms' evolutions. [...] No words can express my profound regret. However, know that some among us were gentle souls who detested these actions. My elder sister Fluora was one such person, and she dedicated her life to ensuring peace between realms. She created the Somas and the fortress of Mysticete so that we might be able to bridge our Spiria.) In the present day, after Minera was destroyed, the xerom continue to threaten the people of Minera and the people who bear Somas and fight the creatures are called Somatics. Other remnants of the Mineran civilization left on the planet include the airship fortress Mysticete, mostly known to the Organicans as the "Forest of Thorns", and mechanoids, machines with synthetic Spirias who acted as guardians to important Minerans. During the events of Hearts, Organica is under the united rule of the Maximus Empire, which waged a war against the world's other factions eighteen years before in a conflict called the "Unification War".

=== Characters ===
Kor Meteor
A boy with a strong curiosity for the world, Kor lives on an isolated island with his grandfather Sydan. Encountering Kohaku and Hisui and venturing beyond his town for the first time, his grandfather is killed by Incarose. His attempt to save Kohaku from an attack of despir unwittingly causes her Spiria to shatter, prompting Kor to join Hisui and Kohaku in an effort to restore her. By the end of the game he has developed romantic feelings for Kohaku. His name is Shing Meteoryte (シング・メテオライト, Shingu Meteoraito) in the original Japanese. His first name was based on the Japanese words "shin" (心) and "gu" (具), which was intended to mean that he "is armed with a heart." His surname was taken from the English word meteorite.

Kohaku Hearts (コハク・ハーツ, Kohaku Hātsu; Kohak Hearts in Japanese)
A girl who travels the world with her brother searching for a Soma, guided on her quest by Lithia. Attacked by Incarose and infected by a xerom, Kor's attempt to save her ends up shattering her Spiria, rendering her virtually emotionless. During the course of the game, she develops romantic feelings for Kor. Kohaku's first name is the Japanese word for "amber". Her name is alternately translated as "Amber Hearts".

Hisui Hearts (ヒスイ・ハーツ, Hisui Hātsu)
Kohaku's older brother. Because of the circumstances of their mother's death, he is overprotective of his sister. He is initially distant and cold towards Kor because of the latter's actions with Kohaku, but gradually comes around. Hisui's first name is the Japanese word for "jade". His name is alternately translated as "Jadeite Hearts".

Ines Lorenzen (イネス・ローレンツ, Inesu Rōrentsu; Innes Lorenz in Japanese)
A woman who is the manager and sole employee of the transport shop "Wanderlust". Possessed of superhuman strength, she initially accompanies the group to help sell her wares. Her surname is based on the mineral lorenzenite.

Beryl Benito (ベリル・ベニト, Beriru Benito)
A girl who ran away from her village to become a court painter, she is easily conned due to her inexperience of the world and prone to be nihilistic. Her name is directly drawn from both the eponymous gemstone and the mineral benitoite.

Kunzite (クンツァイト, Kuntsaito)
A guardian knight hidden from the public by those currently using him, he is an ancient machine constructed with functions that mimic and understand human emotions, giving him the equivalent of a heart. He was created as Richea's guardian. His name is one of the names for spodumene.

Chalcedony Akerman (カルセドニー・アーカム, Karusedonii Aakamu; Calcedny Arcome in Japanese)
The leader of the Crystal Knights, Chalcedony has been a skilled swordsman from childhood, and is initially antagonistic towards the protagonists. Originally a non-player character (NPC) in Hearts, he is included as a playable character in Hearts R.

Gall Gruner (ガラド・グリナス, Garado Gurinasu; Galando Grinus in Japanese)
A veteran Somatic who joins Kor's group in the hope of destroying the Xerom. He became a master after his wife and daughter were killed by Xerom, and becomes attached to Kohaku as she reminds him of his daughter. Initially cold and distant, he begins to show a lighter side while traveling with the group.

=== Plot ===
Note: Aside from the addition of Gall and Chalcedony's presence in the late section of the game, the plots of Hearts and Hearts R are the same.

Kor Meteor, a young man living on a remote island with his grandfather Sydan and being trained as a Somatic, encounters Kohaku and Hisui Hearts outside his village: they are fleeing from the female mechanoid Incarose and are seeking a Soma. After finding one on the island, the island is attacked by Incarose and a group of xerom. During the conflict, Sydan is fatally injured by Incarose and Kohaku is infected with despir. Despite his inexperience, Kor enters Kohaku to destroy the infection. While there, he encounters a Mineran called Lithia Spodumene, who has been using Kohaku as a host. Sensing a hostile presence inside Kor during an angry outburst from him, Lithia causes Kohaku's Spiria to shatter: aside from one fragment, the pieces are scattered across the world. (Note: Lithia: This power! It is exactly like- No. Such a thing should not be. It cannot be! Forgive me, Kohaku! I have no alternative!) (Note: Kor: That's a piece of Kohaku's Spiria Core. / Hisui: So it ain't all gone then? / Kor: Well, her core shattered, but it looks like the shard containing her kindness stayed behind.) Feeling responsible, Kor chooses to go with Hisui to restore Kohaku's Spiria. (Note: Kor: That light must be pointing to a shard of Kohaku's Spiria Core. We should check it out. / Hisui: [hits Kor] Check it out? CHECK IT OUT? This ain't a freakin' field trip, kid! And you're certefiably insane if you think I'll let the likes of you hang around Kohaku! / Kor: Okay, fine. But I'm still going! Kohaku's problem is my fault, after all. I have to fix it. I have to make it right.) During their quest, they are joined by Somatic Gall, Ines, Beryl, Kunzite, and reluctantly Chalcedony: through their early encounters with him, they become involved in a conflict between the Maximus Empire's military and religious authorities. They are also opposed by Silver, the head of a rebel militant group who wants to use Mineran technology to topple the Empire and create a new world order. (Note: Silver: Let me tell you a little story. In the Age of Stones, the world was ruled by an alien race with bodies of crystal. The aliens, called the Minerans, invented many of the weapons of Will - including xeroms, Somas and your mechanical friend there. All of these are controlled by the Forest of Thorns, and the Mineran known as Lithia is the key. Of course, I'm not telling the mechanoid anything it doesn't already know. / Kunzite: What I know is that you are another petty human bent on exploiting Mineran technology for your own ambitions. / Silver: Not ambition, my friend. Ideals! I wish to mold this world into a utopia filled with noble and true Spirias. And such a cause requires great power.) They eventually arrive at the fortress Mysticete, where they retrieve the final piece from Silver and are forced to kill him when he fuses with a xerom. It is then revealed that Kor holds the consciousness of Creed Graphite, a hostile Mineran and Incarose's master, within him. Creed and Lithia, within their respective hosts, briefly do battle, but the effort on Lithia's part breaks a seal containing their physical forms, allowing the two Minerans to return to them.

The group escape Mysticete with Lithia, who explains that in an effort to stop the warring on Minera, Creed, Lithia and her sister Fluora created Gardenia, a xerom capable of remotely absorbing Spirias. Though intended to quell violent thoughts in the population, Gardenia went berserk when activated and absorbed every Spiria on Minera, calcifying the planet. (Note: Lithia: Creed, too, once desired peace, although the thing he created in that service was an abomination. [...] The queen of all xeroms. The "Savior System", capable of absorbing Spirias from afar. You know her as "Gardenia". The "black moon". [...] The white moon was not always white. Once it was a vibrant blue planet, and our home world of Minera. But 2000 years ago, Creed and I activated Gardenia, and in the process caused our own planet to calcify. We thought we were doing right. We only wanted to remove the seeds of war from our people's Spiria. But we made a horrible mistake. Our world was doomed the instant we set Gardenia in motion.) Fluora used herself to seal Gardenia away, and when Creed attempted to free Fluora, Lithia interfered, causing both to be separated from their physical forms: since then, they have been living in Organican hosts and battling each other for two millennia. Creed, who still believes the Minerans are alive within Gardenia, intends to undo Fluora's work and rebuilding Minera at the cost of Organica and its people. (Note: Lithia: Having expelled each other's Spirias from our physical bodies, Creed and I existed in Organican hosts for millennia. Changing hosts over countless generations, we waged a secret and endless war for control of Gardenia. [...] / Hisui: So what's Creed plan now he's got his little science project off and running again? / Lithia: Creed believes that the Spiria of all Minerans are alive within Gardenia. He also believes that Fluora is alive, despite her sacrificing herself to the beast so she might escape. He intends to reactivate Gardenia, and resurrect my sister, along with our entire planet.) In the aftermath, Kohaku and Kor find out how Lithia and Creed ended up inside them: eighteen years before, Creed and Lithia were respectively in the bodies of Zirconia, then-ruler of the Maximus Empire, and Iola Hearts, Kohaku's mother. Iola faced Zirconia with a group of Somatics that included Sydan and Kor's mother Kardia, who was then carrying him. During their final battle, Iola's Spiria was shattered, forcing Lithia to transfer herself into the unborn Kohaku's Spiria, and Creed was forced to abandon his host, leaving Zirconia emotionally scarred. Creed attempted to possess Kardia's child, but with help from the unborn Kor, she succeeded in sealing Creed away with Kor's help at the cost of her Spiria. (Note: Kardia: Stay away from my kid, bastard! You haven't SEEN dangerous until you've run into an angry mother! / Creed: Impressive. But without your friends, it will take more than a flimsy seal to contain me! Wh-What's this? Where is this new power coming from? H-how?! Why?! Yaaaaaaaargh! / Kardia: Aw, did you help Mommy? Good to know I have a kid who listens! Unlike me. Heh. That seal was just patchwork though. It won't be holding him forever. Sorry, kid. Mommy tried her best.) Though Kor is initially disheartened by these revelations, Kohaku helps bring him round. (Note: Kor: You remember Gramps' last words, right? "Do not hate. To not succumb to anger in the heat of battle." I screwed that up about as badly as a guy can. Now Creed's back to destroy the world, and it's my fault. The Xerom? The despir? Creed? It all comes back to me. Everyone would be better off if I died! / Kohaku: That's not true! Because you're alive, I was able to meet you. And meeting you has made me happy. [...] "Even the darkest place has a little bit of light." You taught me that!)

With Creed controlling Mysticete and xerom attacking people across the planet, the group, along with Peridot and Pyrox, manage to unite the disputing factions of the Maximus Empire. With the world now united against the xerom, they set off to find the means of turning Chalcedony's wing-based Soma into an airship for their use. In gathering the final component inside an active volcano, Incarose attacks them and the group are forced to leave Peridot and Pyrox to die. After this, Lithia is shown to be dying, as her Spiria is in a severely weakened condition, but she resolves to live until her mission is complete. (Note: Kunzite: This phenomenon is the preliminary stage of calcification! / Hisui: Your Spiria's that far gone, Lithia? I had no idea. / Lithia: I trust you two can keep it a secret? / Hisui: But! / Lithia: I will not perish so easily! Not before I've sealed Gardenia away once and for all.) During their first assault on Mysticete, the group are repelled and end up on Minera. Finding their way to a transport tower that can take them to Gardenia, they have a final confrontation with Incarose, who is defeated and forced to provide the power for their journey at the cost of her life. Reaching Gardenia, the two are unable to prevent Creed from freeing Fluora and activating Gardenia. Gardenia instantly absorbs Fluora, and Creed fuses with it in an attempt to gain control over it. When he is defeated, Kor and Kohaku, together with his friends and the still-living Mineran Spirias, destroy Gardenia, then escape as Creed dies with Gardenia. After learning that the Minerans have a chance of being reborn, Kunzite saves the dying Lithia by sealing her inside his Spiria and entering a comatose state. (Note: Kunzite: Clinoseraph looped time within his Nexus, replaying the day of Minera's calcification over and over. Therefore, it is logical to assume that I can control time within my Nexus as well. If I can replay time, I can stop it. And if Master Lithia sleeps in such a state, she can live on.) (Note: Closing narration: There lies a princess fair and dear, who has slept for over a thousand years, amidst a bramble of thorny spires. The love of friends is a radiant beam, and to them she grants a sword of dreams. An ebony moon by the hero slew. An ivory moon to be born anew. The whale of legend still does fly, but now it is a star in the dark night sky, to soothe the sleep of you and I. The princess dreams in her forest of thorns. The prayers of people her heart warms. She is protected by her metal knight, as two stars shine out eternal light. And she is always dreaming. Dreaming her world will awaken.) After this, the rest of the group return to Kor's home village, where Kor and Kohaku confirm their love for each other.

== Development ==
Hearts began development in the winter of 2006, while debugging was being performed on the PlayStation 2 remake of Tales of Destiny, though active development did not begin until spring the following year. The production was headed by Hideo Baba, producing his first original Tales game, and the development team was made up of members from both "Team Symphonia" (the team behind 3D entries in the series) and "Team Destiny" (responsible for 2D titles). Multiple development assets were borrowed from the Destiny remake for use in Hearts. The earliest form of the game was as a DS remake of Destiny. The game's characteristic genre name, a recurring feature of the series in Japan, was Kokoro to deau RPG (心と出会うRPG, lit. "A Meeting Between Hearts RPG"), which represented the core theme of people's hearts meeting and uniting to overcome difficulties in their lives. The characters were designed by regular Tales series designer Mutsumi Inomata. Inomata worked on the designs while she was also working on character designs for Tales of Innocence, and found it hard working on both titles at once. The characters' names were inspired by various ores and gemstones. More conventional names were repeatedly suggested and rejected.

Despite being the third Tales title on the Nintendo DS after Tales of the Tempest and Innocence, it was the first to be produced by Namco Tales Studio, and thus it was an unusual experience for the development team. According to director Naoto Miyadera, one of the most difficult aspects was creating a suitable interface and fitting the game's content on the limited hardware, which required a trial-and-error programming process. During the early phases, the team considered ways of using the DS touch screen during battles, but this was eventually scrapped and the final game made little to no use of the feature. Production I.G created the anime cutscenes, while Shirogumi created CGI cutscenes for a separate edition of the game. The CGI cutscenes were worked on by a three-person team, including company director Manabu Koike: the three worked closely with the development team to make sure the cutscenes fit properly into the game, and that they did justice to Inomata's character designs despite the different animation style. One issue they had was lip-synching dialog to the CGI character models. The main reason behind the creation of CGI cutscenes was that the team wanted to try something new, attempting to sell two versions of the games. Hearts was released as two separate game editions: the "Anime Edition", featuring the cutscenes by Production I.G, and "CG Movie Edition", using the Shirogumi cutscenes. After release, it was determined that the CGI cutscenes were less popular with fans. Speaking to Siliconera after the game's release, Baba said that it was the Tales game he most wanted western players to try out, due to its story and technical achievements.

=== Hearts R ===
Hearts R was primarily developed by Japan-based developer 7th Chord, with staff from in-house development studio Bandai Namco Studios helping with development. The game was a complete remake of Hearts, featuring full voice acting for the main scenario, new playable characters, 3D graphics and over ten new anime cutscenes created by Production I.G. in addition to the "Anime Edition" cutscenes already present. Due to the poor reception of the "CG Edition" by the fanbase, it was decided not to use CGI cutscenes again. It was given an altered genre name: Aratana kokoro to deau RPG (新たな心と出会うRPG, lit. "A New Meeting Between Hearts RPG"). The staff of the game also had differences: Hironori Naoi replaced Kazuhisa Oomi as director, while Takashi Yota (also known under the alias "Ryuji Odate") and Mika Murakita produced the game in place of Baba. Inomata returned as character designer.

The concept behind Hearts R was to leave the base story and theme intact while building on and improving it, using the development of Innocence R as a template. It was developed alongside Innocence R, and many staff overlapped on the projects. Naoi joined the team in early 2012, after finishing work on Tales of the Heroes: Twin Brave, and was the principal developer for the new combat system. In the middle of development, the "Chase Link" system was added based on a similar gameplay mechanic from Innocence R. Naoki Yamanoto, the scenario writer for Hearts, returned to co-write the extra story content with Keishi Maeda. For the rebuilt battle system, the team were asked by Baba to create a sense of speed when compared with the original. Along with the gameplay and story additions, two new playable characters were introduced: Chalcedony and new character Gall Gruner. Chalcedony, originally an antagonist in Hearts, was included in the playable cast to fully explore the character's relationship with Kor. Gall was originally conceived as a woman, but at a suggestion from Murakita for a mature leader figure for the group, Gall was changed to a man. Inomota's design was based on a picture of Yota wearing sunglasses. The narrative connection to Innocence R was initially unplanned, but positive fan reception prompted the team to add it in.

=== Audio ===
Heart's soundtrack was composed by veteran Tales composer Motoi Sakuraba, Hiroshi Tamura and Shinji Tamura (as Hibiki Aoyama). The official soundtrack album, Tales of Hearts Original Soundtrack, was published by BMG Japan on two compact discs on December 10, 2008. In addition to the original soundtrack, a special disc of selected arranged tracks titled Tales of Hearts CG Movie Edition Visual & Original Soundtrack DVD was released alongside the "CG Movie Edition" of the game. Reviews of the soundtrack have been mixed. RPGFan's Patrick Gann both called it the best soundtrack of the three Nintendo DS Tales games and a weaker soundtrack than the console-based Tales games. Max Nevill of Game-OST was also mixed, feeling that the album was too much like previous Tales scores by Sakuraba. Some tracks did please him, but he noted that some might not find them to their taste. The music featured in Hearts R was re-arranged and added to by Kazuhiro Nakamura and Sakuraba. (Note: Ending Credits)

The game's theme song, "Eien no Ashita" (永遠の明日; "Eternal Tomorrow"), was written and performed by Japanese rock band Deen, who had previously performed the theme song for the original version of Destiny. The single reached 6th place in the Oricon charts during its first week of release and remained in the charts for eight weeks. Both Gann and Nevill praised the song and the multiple versions found in the soundtrack: Nevill called it "a charismatic and emotional rock ballad", while Gann referred to it as "a great opening single". In the western release, it was replaced with an original track from the game, instead of an orchestrated instrumental version of the theme song used in some promotional DVDs, due to licensing issues.

== Release ==
In order to compete against Square Enix's PlayStation Portable exclusive Dissidia Final Fantasy, which was releasing on the same day as Hearts, the company heavily promoted the game at several events and offered multiple pre-order bonuses for buyers. The original version of Hearts has not been released in the west, and a fan translation for this version was released in 2009. Hearts R came as both a standard edition and a special edition titled "Linked Edition", which included a Vita and accessories themed after the game. First print copies of Hearts R gave access to a special downloadable game called Tales of Hearts R: Infinite Evolve. Rendered in the same graphic style as Hearts, it is a game separate from the main story with an exponentially increasing difficulty level. At release, DLC outfits for the characters were created themed around "idol", "school", "maid" and "butler". Another set was based around protagonists from previous Tales games. Hearts R was also ported to and released on iOS mobile devices in October 2013 exclusively in Japan.

=== Vita version ===
Speculation about the existence of Hearts R started back in early 2012. The game was first teased during the credits of Innocence R, with both a post-credits message saying "To be continued to next Re-imagination", and artwork in certain dungeons featuring scenes and characters from both Hearts and Tempest. This caused speculation as to whether the next remake was Tempest, Hearts or both. Hearts R was officially announced in Weekly Shōnen Jump in October 2012.

The localization of the title was originally unplanned, but during heavy promotion of the Tales series in Europe and North America alongside the domestic release of Innocence R and Hearts R, there were multiple requests from the western fanbase to bring the titles west: as Hearts R was the most recent title, it was chosen for localization. The localization was officially announced in April 2014. Unlike previous localizations, the game remained with Japanese voice acting, but with subtitles in multiple languages. This decision was influenced both by limited space on the Vita cartridge and fan requests for the original Japanese voice track. The North American physical release was exclusive to video game retail line GameStop. It also received a digital release on PlayStation Store. For its European release, a special day-one "Soma Linked Edition" was created: it featured three costumes from Tales of Vesperia. The edition also included a code to enter a competition for five autographed Japanese Collector's Editions of Hearts R, which would include a special congratulatory video from Baba and a personalized case featuring the winner's name. Pre-order downloadable content in the form of character costumes was also created. The costume DLC was also made available in North America from selected stores. The stores also had a limited digital release of the game alongside the physical release. Hearts R is compatible with the PlayStation TV.

=== Media adaptations ===
Hearts R received a manga adaptation of the same name. The manga was eventually collected into a single volume and released under the title Tales of Hearts R Comic Anthology (テイルズ オブ ハーツ R コミックアンソロジー, Teiruzu Obu Hātsu R Komikku Ansorojī) on 25 June 2013. An official strategy guide, Tales of Hearts R Official Complete Guide (テイルズ オブ ハーツR 公式コンプリートガイド, Teiruzu Obu Hātsu R Kōshiki Konpurīto Gaido), was released on 14 March 2013. Five audio dramas based on Hearts were produced after the release of the official soundtrack, released under the general name of Tales of Hearts Drama CD (テイルズ オブ ハーツ ドラマＣＤ, Teiruzu Obu Hātsu Dorama CD).

== Reception ==
Reception

Aggregate scores
Aggregator	Score
GameRankings	76.65% (Vita)
Metacritic	78/100 (Vita)
OpenCritic	57% recommend(R) (Note: Based on 31 reviews.)

Review scores
Publication	Score
Destructoid	7/10 (Vita)
Electronic Gaming Monthly	8/10 (Vita)
Famitsu	33/40 (DS); 34/40 (Vita)
Game Informer	7/10 (Vita)
Hardcore Gamer	3.5/5 (Vita)
RPGFan	93% (DS); 75% (Vita)
RPGamer	4/5 (DS); 3.5/5 (Vita)

=== Nintendo DS ===
Bandai Namco had high expectations for Hearts, preparing shipments of 400,000 units, based on previous high sales they had for Innocence. During its week of release, Hearts reached fourth place in Famitsu's sales charts and fifth place in Dengeki's. It sold 137,000 units in its week of release, more than Innocence in a similar period: the "Anime Edition" accounted for 122,000 units, while the "CG Movie" edition sold 15,000. According to Famitsu, Hearts sold a slightly higher 140,000 units in its first week. By the end of the year, both versions of the game together had sold 176,526 units, placing #72 in Famitsu's list of 2008's 100 best-selling titles. As of 2009, the game has sold 260,000 units.

Famitsu gave the game 33/40 points from four reviewers. They praised the battles as being "plain fun", there being "a ton of volume to the story" and both the anime and CG cutscenes. Their main criticism was that there was little difference between the two versions besides the cutscenes. Japanese gaming site Game Watch Impress was greatly positive about most aspects, saying it would fully satisfy fans of the series despite some elements falling below expectations for the series. Andrew Barker of RPGFan, reviewing an imported version of the "Anime Edition" of Hearts, was highly positive: he praised the story for straying from the normal course of a Tales narrative, called the graphics "outstanding", the music "excellent", and was generally positive about the battle system and graphic presentation. It was also awarded the site's "Editor's Choice" award.

=== PlayStation Vita ===
Hearts R also did well commercially in Japan, selling 55,258 copies in its first week, outselling previous Vita Tales title Innocence R. The title sold 75,049 units by June that year, ranking among Japan's fifty top-selling games of that year. Famitsu ranked Hearts R a little higher than the original, giving it 34/40: they cited the battles as being "more exciting" than in Hearts, and generally praised the additions to the story. They also praised the graphical overhaul, calling it "a true Tales at the core." Dengeki PlayStation also praised the game, with the four reviewers giving it scores of 80, 85, 90 and 93. Praise went to the fully voiced main scenario, the new playable characters and aspects of the battle system. The main criticisms were "flat" graphics and other elements of the battle system such as the lack of character support and companion AI.

Western reviews of the title have been mixed to positive: review aggregate sites GameRankings and Metacritic gave it scores of 76.77% and 77/100 based on 22 and 23 critic reviews respectively. The gameplay was a general point of praise. RPGFan's John McCarroll said that its various elements "tie together to provide a cohesive battle experience that's quite enjoyable" despite him finding it inferior to Tales of Graces, and Destructoid's Kyle MacGregor said that the experience "can be quite fun". Hardcore Gamer's Adam Beck said that the combat "works perfectly on the handheld system", while Kimberley Wallace of Game Informer said that the pace and various features "help keep [the battles] exciting." Andrew Fitch of Electronic Gaming Monthly was more mixed about the gameplay, citing the combat as a less smooth experience compared to previous Tales titles and being annoyed at the reintroduction of random encounters, a feature not present in the original Hearts.

The story received a generally mixed response. Beck found the characters to be a mixed assortment, being particularly unimpressed with Kohaku's condition through most of the game and stating that her awkward romance with Kor "almost feels forced". Wallace referred to the storyline as "cheesy and campy", stating that it didn't impress her despite it not being taken very seriously. McCarrol was unimpressed by the story or the cast, while MacGregor cited the story as "a slow-burn", though commenting that the cast succeeded in seeming like real people rather than character archetypes. In contrast with the other reviewers, Fitch generally enjoyed the story, calling it one of the stronger casts and narratives of recent Tales titles. The localization received some criticism over discrepancies between the English text and Japanese dialogue, with Fitch describing it as "written with an ultimately canceled English dub in mind", and McCarrol citing the renaming of some characters despite the presence of the original Japanese as a downside. MacGregor, while not minding the setup, was concerned that the lack of an English option would cause controversy. Todd Ciolek of Anime News Network listed the game as the second most overlooked title from 2014, stating that its release mediums and close proximity to the release of Tales of Xillia 2 hampered its notability.

== Notes and references ==
Notes

Primary references

Bandai Namco Studios, 7th Chord (11 November 2014). Tales of Hearts R (PlayStation Vita). Bandai Namco Games.
