= Tri-Crescendo =

Japanese video game developer

tri-Crescendo
- Type: Kabushiki gaisha
- Industry: Video games
- Founded: 1999
- Headquarters: Tokyo, Japan
- Key people: Hiroya Hatsushiba
- Products: Baten Kaitos series Eternal Sonata; Fragile Dreams
- Number of employees: 29 (2024)
- Website: tri-crescendo.co.jp

tri-Crescendo is a Japanese video game developer. It was founded in February 1999 by Hiroya Hatsushiba, who still runs the company. Hatsushiba, originally being a sound programmer, carried his experience into tri-Crescendo; the company was initially responsible for the sound in all games by tri-Ace starting with Valkyrie Profile until 2001 when the company co-created Baten Kaitos with Monolith Soft. tri-Crescendo then went on to make Eternal Sonata for the Xbox 360 and PlayStation 3 and Fragile Dreams: Farewell Ruins of the Moon for the Wii.

tri-Crescendo was responsible for the programming and sound design in both the first Baten Kaitos and the prequel, Baten Kaitos Origins. In the first game battle planning was handled by Hiroya Hatsushiba, from tri-Crescendo and Yoshiharu Kuwabara from Monolith Soft, but in the second game it was handled by tri-Crescendo themselves led by Shuhei Rokumoto.

== Games developed ==
Year	Title	Platform(s)	Notes
1999	Valkyrie Profile	PlayStation	Sound development for tri-Ace
2001	Star Ocean: Blue Sphere	Game Boy Color	Sound development for tri-Ace
2001	The Fear	PlayStation 2	Sound development
2003	Star Ocean: Till the End of Time	PlayStation 2	Sound development for tri-Ace
2003	Baten Kaitos: Eternal Wings and the Lost Ocean	GameCube	Co-developed with Monolith Soft
2005	Radiata Stories	PlayStation 2	Sound development for tri-Ace
2006	Baten Kaitos Origins	GameCube	Co-developed with Monolith Soft
2006	Valkyrie Profile 2: Silmeria	PlayStation 2	Sound development for tri-Ace
2007	Eternal Sonata	PlayStation 3, Xbox 360	
2009	Blue Dragon: Awakened Shadow	Nintendo DS	Co-developed with Mistwalker
2009	Calling	Wii	Sound development for Hudson Soft
2009	Fragile Dreams: Farewell Ruins of the Moon	Wii	Co-developed with Bandai Namco Games
2011	Danbōru Senki	PlayStation Portable	Co-developed with Level-5
2011	Danbōru Senki Boost	PlayStation Portable	Co-developed with Level-5
2012	Digimon World Re:Digitize	PlayStation Portable	
2013	Digimon World Re:Digitize Decode	Nintendo 3DS	
2013	Tales of Symphonia Chronicles	PlayStation 3	HD remaster of Tales of Symphonia and Tales of Symphonia: Dawn of the New World
2014	Super Smash Bros. for Nintendo 3DS	Nintendo 3DS	Co-developed with Sora Ltd. and Bandai Namco Studios
2014	Super Smash Bros. for Wii U	Wii U	Co-developed with Sora Ltd. and Bandai Namco Studios
2015	Tales of Zestiria	PlayStation 3, PlayStation 4	Co-developed with Bandai Namco Studios
2016	Tales of Berseria	PlayStation 3, PlayStation 4	Co-developed with Bandai Namco Studios
2016	The Idolmaster Platinum Stars	PlayStation 4	Co-developed with Bandai Namco Studios
2017	Mario Sports Superstars	Nintendo 3DS	Co-developed with Camelot Software Planning
2017	Gundam Versus	PlayStation 4	Co-developed with Bandai Namco Studios
2018	Mobile Suit Gundam Extreme Versus 2	Arcade	Co-developed with Bandai Namco Studios
2018	Super Smash Bros. Ultimate	Nintendo Switch	Co-developed with Sora Ltd. and Bandai Namco Studios
2021	Tales of Arise	PlayStation 4, PlayStation 5, Xbox One, Xbox Series X and Series S	Co-developed with Bandai Namco Studios
2022	Gran Turismo 7	PlayStation 4, PlayStation 5	Co-developed with Polyphony Digital
2022	SD Gundam Battle Alliance	PlayStation 4, PlayStation 5, Xbox One, Xbox Series X and Series S, Nintendo Switch	
2025	Donkey Kong Bananza	Nintendo Switch 2	Co-developed with Nintendo EPD & 1-Up Studio
2025	Kirby Air Riders	Nintendo Switch 2	Co-developed with Sora Ltd. and Bandai Namco Studios
