= Hideo Baba =

Japanese video game producer

- 馬場 英雄
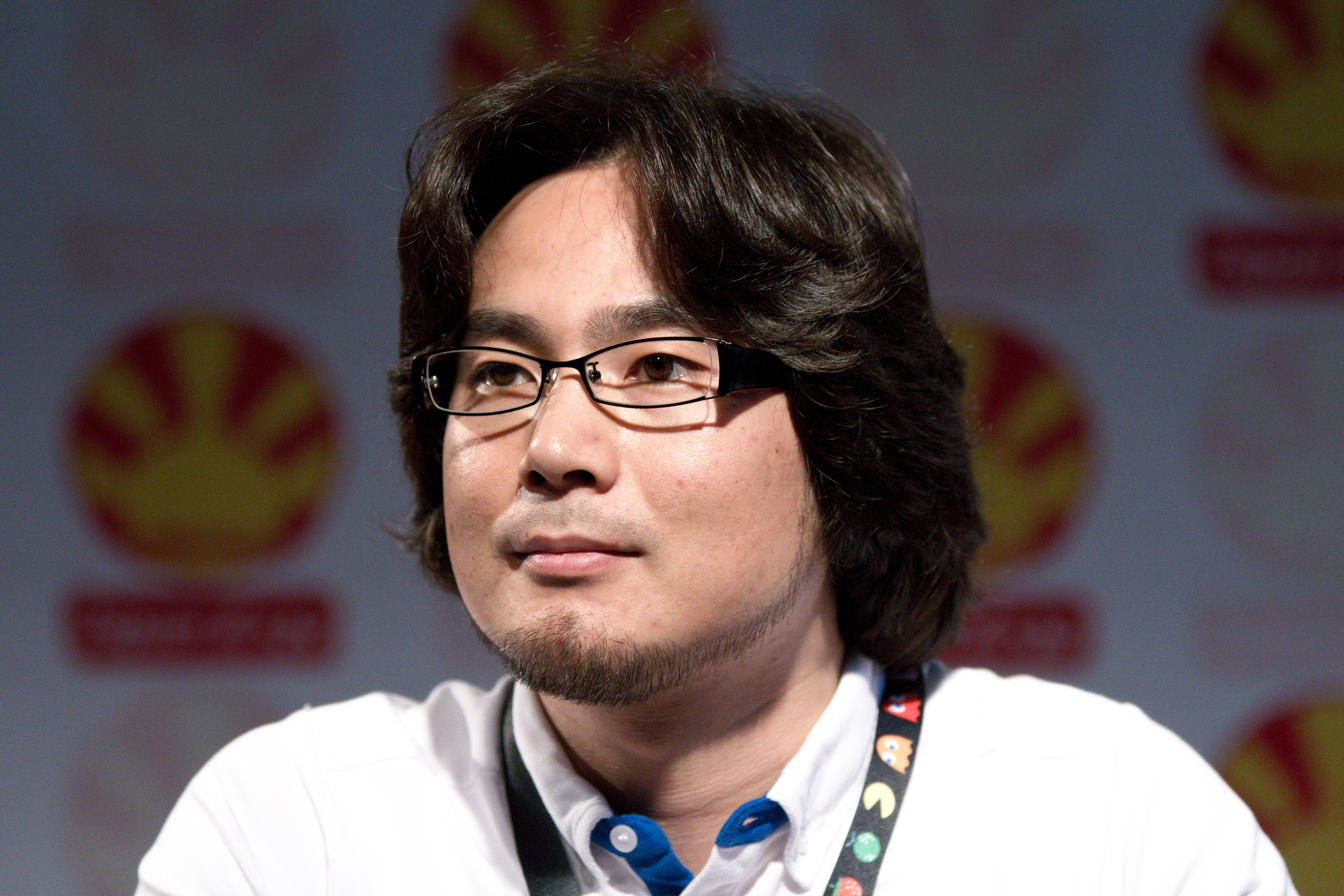
- Occupation: Video game producer
- Known for: Tales series

Hideo Baba (馬場 英雄, Baba Hideo) is a Japanese video game producer and president of the game development company, Studio Istolia. He formerly worked at Namco Bandai Studios where he was hired by them before their merge to be primarily involved with the production of the Tales video games. He joined Namco in 2001. From Tales of Innocence (2007), he was the brand manager and the producer of the Tales of video game series.

On February 21, 2017, Square Enix announced the formation of a new development studio, Studio Istolia, with Baba the president of the studio and producer of its first game Project Prelude Rune. In April 5, 2019 it was announced that Hideo Baba had resigned from Square Enix and Studio Istolia due to a change in management policies.

== Games ==
- Death by Degrees [PS2] (January 27, 2005) — production manager
- Tales of Destiny [PS2] (November 30, 2006) — director
- Tales of Innocence [DS] (December 6, 2007) — producer
- Tales of Destiny - Director's Cut [PS2] (January 31, 2008) — producer
- Tales of Symphonia: Dawn of the New World [Wii] (June 26, 2008) - production supervisor
- Tales of Vesperia [X360] (August 7, 2008) — brand manager
- Eternal Sonata [PS3] (September 18, 2008) — producer
- Tales of Hearts [DS] (December 18, 2008) — producer
- Tales of the World: Radiant Mythology 2 [PSP] (January 29, 2009) — producer
- Tales of VS [PSP] (August 6, 2009) — producer
- Blue Dragon: Awakened Shadow [DS] (October 8, 2009) — producer
- Tales of Graces [Wii] (December 10, 2009) — producer
- Tales of Graces F [PS3] (December 2, 2010) — producer
- Tales of Xillia [PS3] (September 8, 2011) — producer
- Tales of the Heroes: Twin Brave [PSP] (February 2, 2012) — Special Thanks
- Tales of Xillia 2 [PS3] (November 1, 2012) — producer
- Tales of Zestiria [PS3] (2015) — producer
- Project Prelude Rune [PS4] (Cancelled) — producer
