= Fragile Dreams: Farewell Ruins of the Moon =

- North American box art featuring the main characters Seto (center) and Ren (bottom)
- Developers: Namco Bandai Games; Tri-Crescendo
- Publishers: JP: Namco Bandai Games; NA: Xseed Games; PAL: Rising Star Games
- Director: Kentaro Kawashima
- Producer: Kentaro Kawashima
- Designers: Kentaro Kawashima; Tomomi Tagawa
- Programmer: Munehito Yasui
- Artists: Keiko Harada; Katsuyuki Ujinawa
- Writers: Kentaro Kawashima; Gingitsune
- Composer: Riei Saito
- Platform: Wii
- Release: JP: January 22, 2009; NA: March 16, 2010; EU: March 19, 2010; AU: April 1, 2010
- Genre: Action role-playing
- Mode: Single-player

Fragile Dreams: Farewell Ruins of the Moon (Note: Japanese: フラジール ～さよなら月の廃墟～, Hepburn: Furajīru: Sayonara Tsuki no Haikyo; lit. Fragile ~Farewell Ruins of the Moon~) is an action role-playing game for the Wii developed by Namco Bandai Games in co-operation with Tri-Crescendo. The game was released by Namco Bandai Games in Japan on January 22, 2009. It was later published by Xseed Games in North America on March 16, 2010, and in Europe by Rising Star Games on March 19, 2010, followed by its release in Australia on April 1, 2010.

== Gameplay ==
A fight in Fragile Dreams: Farewell Ruins of the Moon: protagonist Seto fights hostile ghosts.

Fragile Dreams: Farewell Ruins of the Moon is an action role-playing game (RPG) in which the player takes on the role of Seto, a young boy exploring ruined environments; while using RPG mechanics, there are also mechanics comparable to those of survival horror. Seto is controlled using the Wii Remote and Nunchuk; his movement is mapped to the Nunchuck analogue stick, the D-pad is mapped to the menus, and the Remote's pointer controls Seto's flashlight which is used to illuminate different environments and tied to the camera position and character rotation. The player can also switch from the standard third-person view into first-person to examine environments and in-game objects.

Much of the game focuses on exploring its environments, completing objectives often tied to the people or spirits Seto encounters while travelling, and managing a limited inventory space which includes weapon slots and consumables for healing. Seto is guided to his objective by the Personal Frame, a mechanical backpack he picks up early in the story. While exploring environments, Seto fills out a map of the area. Some parts require particular approaches, such as moving slowly over weak floors. Seto can find fires which act as save points, allow inventory items to be switched round or deposited in a suitcase, and give access to a merchant who sells consumables and weapons. Seto can highlight clues in the environment such as graffiti on walls, and collect Mystery Items, objects which once identified can be either consumables or items tied to a story retelling part of someone's history. Mystery Items can either be found in the environment, highlighted by gatherings of fireflies, or dropped be enemies.

During the game, Seto must fight off hostole ghosts which are initially invisible. The player can detect them through sound cues fed through the Wii Remote's speaker, and make them visible using the flashlight. Combat has Seto fighting with different melee and ranged weapons, with melee attack patterns dictated by how the player presses the attack button: repeated presses trigger a standard combination attack, while holding a button lands more powerful attacks. After being used for a certain time, melee weapons break, which weakens their damage output and prevents combination attacks. Defeating enemies awards in-game currency, items, and experience points which raise Seto's level, boosting his health and attack power.

== Story ==
=== Setting and characters ===
Fragile Dreams is set in a near-future where humanity has been almost wiped out by an unknown catastrophe: what traces remain are memory fragments which take the form of ghosts. Previously-populous cities have been abandoned, with metal structures rusting and becoming covered in greenery. The game is specifically set in and around the ruins of Tokyo.

The main protagonist is Seto, a lonely 15-year old boy who recently lost his grandfather and goes on a journey to find other survivors. He is initially accompanied by Personal Frame (P.F.), an artificial intelligence (AI) stored in a mechanical backpack. During his journey he encounters a number of other characters, both survivors and spirits. These include Ren, an enigmatic white-haired girl; Crow, a young man who is also exploring Tokyo in search of childhood memories; Sai, a spirit that possesses Seto and offers comments on his situation; Chiyo, a hostile young girl who suffers from great loneliness; and Shin, a taciturn scientist alienated from his former peers due to his intelligence.

=== Plot ===
The story is narrated by an older Seto, who recalls becoming truly alone after his grandfather dies, leaving only a locket; the locket's blue stone allows Seto to perceive and fight lingering ghosts. Discovering a letter in his possessions, he follows its instructions to "reach a tall red tower" to the east where other survivors might be found. He is also attacked by a mask-like entity dubbed "Tracker" which appears periodically through the game. During his journey to the tower, Seto runs into Ren, whom he initially scares off due to his unfamiliarity with human contact, and picks up P.F. while exploring a subway area, who helps him navigate the old tunnels. Before arriving at the surface, P.F.'s battery fails, and Seto buries it. Reaching an abandoned amusement park, Seto runs into Crow, who steals the locket and forces Seto to give chase. Upon being caught, Crow returns the locket and gives Seto his ring as keepsake before leaving.

Continuing his journey in pursuit of both the tower and Ren, Seto ends up being possessed by Sai, and helps the spirit of Chiyo finds rest. He runs into Crow again, who is revealed to be a robot. Crow dies with his battery expires, prompting Seto to mourn him. Eventually finding Ren, who connects with Seto but is also under the influence of Shin, who sees Seto as a threat. Sai reveals that the catastrophe was caused by Glass Cage, a scientific project intended to allow humans to communicate empathically without words, with her as its first catalyst. Upon activation, Glass Cage caused people to die in their sleep around the world. Shin, who along with Tracker is a remnant of the Glass Cage team, wants to use Ren as the next catalyst to complete humanity's extinction.

Seto reaches the red tower, where the Glass Cage project is housed, defeating Tracker along the way. While he frees Ren, Shin has copied her psyche into AI form and is ready to trigger Glass Cage again. Upon being confronted, Shin reveals that he was Glass Cage's first test subject, and only ever felt envy or hatred from those around him, wanting to end humanity as a result. Sai, who fell in love with Shin after becoming the catalyst, talks him out of his scheme by sharing her emotions with him. Before the two fade away, Shin destroys Glass Cage's AI mainframe, preventing it from ever being activated. The game ends with Seto and Ren heading out together in search of other survivors; the older Seto's narration reveals that Ren eventually died, leaving him alone once more. (Note: In a post-release interview, Kentaro Kawashima confirmed both that Ren eventually died, and that humanity did survive in small numbers.)

== Development ==
Fragile Dreams was developed by the team at Namco Bandai Games. Director and producer Kentarō Kawashima came up with the concept for the game in 2003, before the Wii console was revealed. When the Wii was unveiled, it became the obvious choice as the game's platform as the Wii remote could be used to control the flashlight. Kawashima wrote the main scenario for the title, with the rest of the events being handled by sub-scenario writer Gingitsune. The sound of the title was carefully designed to coincide with the game's environments. The game's music, composed by Riei Saitō, was built around the game's ruined atmosphere. The theme song and ending theme, "Hikari" (光; "light") and "Tsuki no Nukumori" (月のぬくもり; "the moon's warmth") respectively, were performed by Aoi Teshima.

In an interview with IGN concerning the English localization of the game, Xseed stated that they will attempt to give players a dual-language option in addition to new content for the North American release. Fragile Dreams did indeed contain both dubs. Actual game content was not changed, as Xseed aims to "keep the original creator’s vision intact as much as possible."

== Reception ==
Reception

Aggregate score
Aggregator	Score
Metacritic	67/100

Review scores
Publication	Score
1Up.com	C+
Destructoid	6/10
Eurogamer	5/10
Famitsu	8/10, 8/10, 8/10, 7/10
GameSpot	7/10
IGN	6.7/10
Nintendo Power	5.5/10
Nintendo World Report	7.5/10
RPGFan	68%

During its opening week, Fragile Dreams sold 26,055 copies, becoming the highest-selling new release and the second best-selling title at the time. By the end of 2010, the game had sold 39,101 units, with a sell-through rate of over 66%. Review aggregate site Metacritic gave Fragile Dreams a normalised score of 67 out of 100, indicating "mixed or average" reception based on 41 reviews.

The story and themes met with widespread acclaim. Casey Loe of Nintendo Power positively noted the story without giving specific commentary, and Japanese gaming magazine Famitsu lauded the story's mysterious tone and the overarching themes. James Stephanie Sterling of Destructoid positively highlighted the game's tragic tone and focus on isolation and loneliness, while Eurogamer's Simon Parkin gave extensive praise to both the main narrative and the short stories players could unlock. Kimberley Wallace, writing for RPGFan, highlighted the story as the game's best part, praising it as an unusual take on a post-apocalyptic setting. Adriaan den Ouden of RPGamer positively highlighted the atmosphere and narrative theme of loneliness, Matt Casamassina of IGN praised the story's presentation and environmental storytelling, while James Jones of Nintendo World Report felt that the story was well-delivered and reinforced by the environment. Carolyn Petit of GameSpot felt the story was not very structured, but made up for it with its themes and characters. 1Up.com's Alice Liang, while noting the atmosphere, disliked the story's slow pace.

The visual and audio presentation also met with a generally positive response. Parkin praised the environmental design and lighting as the game's best feature, calling Fragile Dreams one of the best-looking games on the Wii. The Famitsu reviewers lauded the environmental design and music, with one highlighting the lighting for sunsets and the design of the ruins. Jones praised the audio design and melancholic soundtrack, while Loe praised the early environments as a perfect match for the story while faulting the corridor designs of later sections. Petit felt the character designs fitted the melancholy environments and praised the musical and audio design, though she felt the voice acting could become "a bit overwrought at times". Liang praised the art design and music, but called the English dub "awkward and stilted", preferring the Japanese voice track. Casamassina lauded the graphics and environment design, highlighted the musical score, and enjoyed the voice acting despite faulting some slow deliveries. Wallace positively noted the game's art design within the Wii's limited hardware, lauded the soundtrack as a fit for the overall tone, but disliked the English cast as not fitting the characters. Ouden again felt the game was one of the best-looking games on the platform and felt the audio and music were "terrific", but faulted the localization in both its in-game text translation and voice acting.

The gameplay design met with general criticism, often for its combat system and inventory management. Wallace enjoyed the exploration and some associated mechanics, but found the combat and limited inventory space frustrating to manage. Ouden was forgiving of the combat as he felt it fit the tone and characters, but felt the inventory system was needlessly restrictive. Casamassina felt the controls were functional, but negatively highlighted the backtracking and quest design. Liang praised the use of the Wii Remote speaker but otherwise faulted the gameplay as boring or simplistic, while Famitsu frequently highlighted the controls and camera as awkward to handle. Loe called the gameplay the game's one major weakness, highlighting the combat as clumsy and faulting the limited inventory as needlessly restrictive. Jones disliked the combat and controls, and also felt the content became less enjoyable towards the ending, and Parkin found the combat awkward due to the lack of a lock-on mechanic along with faulting the "generally tedious" puzzles and the inventory management. Petit disliked the combat, and was highly critical of the inventory management due to how weapon damage was handled. Sterling disliked the combat and was highly negative about the other gameplay elements, faulting the empty level areas and frustrating mechanics despite liking the story.
