= Hiroya Hatsushiba =

Japanese video game sound designer

Hiroya Hatsushiba (Japanese: 初芝 弘也, Hatsushiba Hiroya) is the founder of video game developer tri-Crescendo, and a long time sound programmer for composer Motoi Sakuraba, whom he also gives English titles of the tracks Sakuraba creates.

Hatsushiba came up as a sound director and programmer for the Telenet Japan subsidiary Wolfteam in 1993. It is here that he met Sakuraba; these two have worked together on various games since then. He was one of the many people that left Telenet Japan on March 6, 1995 to participate in the founding of tri-Ace. Here, he continued his sound programmer duties for Sakuraba, as well as doing some field programming.

In 1999, he left tri-Ace and formed tri-Crescendo. While initially continuing to provide sound programming for tri-Ace's games, tri-Crescendo moved into game development in 2001. Hatsushiba partnered up with Monolith Soft to develop Baten Kaitos: Eternal Wings and the Lost Ocean, which became one of the more successful games for GameCube. Developmental duties have continued for its sequel, as well as Eternal Sonata, which he both directed and wrote story material for, as writing the original lyrics (later adapted into Italian) for the original song "Heaven's Mirror."

His alias "Hassy" has been said to be fellow game sound designer Michiko Naruke's. However, Michiko claimed in an interview "Hassy" was not her, but rather Hatsushiba.
