= Yasuyuki Honne =

Video game artist

- 本根 康之
- Born: March 5, 1971 (age 55)
- Occupations: Art director, video game director, and producer
- Board member of: Monolith Soft
- Website: honnesan.seesaa.net

Yasuyuki Honne (本根 康之, Honne Yasuyuki; born March 5, 1971) is a video game artist, director and producer. He was employed by Square from 1993 to 1999 and is now working at Monolith Soft. He is known for his work on the Chrono series, Xeno games and Baten Kaitos series.

== Early life ==
Yasuyuki Honne was born on March 5, 1971. When he was young, Honne enjoyed video games and playing fighting games in video arcades, but wanted to become a freelance illustrator. However, after graduating and moving to Tokyo, he saw a recruitment ad for Square in the magazine Gamest, with a picture of Final Fantasy VI. Since his design studies had made him interested in the relationship between a person's life and fantasy art, Honne decided to apply for a job at the company.

== Career ==
Honne joined Square as a graphic artist in 1993 and notably worked on Front Mission and Chrono Trigger under graphic director Tetsuya Takahashi. Honne then served as the art director of Square's Product Development Division-3 on Xenogears and Chrono Cross. In 1999, Honne left Square to join Monolith Soft, the new company founded by Takahashi, previously Xenogears' director, who had suggested that Honne and he work together again after Honne finishes working on Chrono Cross. Honne became a board member of Monolith Soft, owning 20 shares out of the total 2,400, and the director of the company's graphics development division. His position also includes handling the graphics work contracted for by external companies.

After serving as the art director for Xenosaga Episode I: Der Wille zur Macht, Honne made his debut as a game director on Baten Kaitos: Eternal Wings and the Lost Ocean, the project that has left him with the fondest memories since the founding of Monolith Soft. This was followed by a prequel, Baten Kaitos Origins. Honne's first project as a game producer was Dragon Ball Z: Attack of the Saiyans, during which he gained experience on the handling of licensed characters. When Takahashi was in the planning stages for the project that would become Xenoblade Chronicles, Honne produced a model of the two gods of the game's world in order to help explain the concept to the publisher Nintendo. Honne is currently working on an unannounced title. As of October 2011, he is part of Monolith Soft's new Kyoto studio.

== Personal life ==
Honne is married. He enjoys traveling, and his hobbies include practicing judo (he is black belt) and playing plucked string instruments.

== Games credited ==
Honne has been credited with the following games:

- Front Mission (1995): assistant graphic designer
- Chrono Trigger (1995): map designer
- Treasure Conflix (1996): main graphic
- Xenogears (1998): art director, map textures
- Chrono Cross (1999): art director, map painter
- Xenosaga Episode I: Der Wille zur Macht (2002): art director, map designer
- Baten Kaitos: Eternal Wings and the Lost Ocean (2003): director, art director, map painter
- Dirge of Cerberus -Final Fantasy VII- (2006): special thanks
- Baten Kaitos Origins (2006): director, art director, map painter, opening movie
- Super Smash Bros. Brawl (2008): Adventure Mode map design
- Dragon Ball Z: Attack of the Saiyans (2009): producer, art director
- Xenoblade Chronicles (2010): concept model
- The Legend of Zelda: Skyward Sword (2011): special thanks
- Project X Zone (2012): map graphic supervisor
- Animal Crossing: New Leaf (2012): special thanks
- Pikmin 3 (2012): special thanks
- The Legend of Zelda: A Link Between Worlds (2013): special thanks
- Splatoon (2015): special thanks
- Animal Crossing: Happy Home Designer (2015): special thanks
- Project X Zone 2 (2015): map graphic supervisor
- The Legend of Zelda: Breath of the Wild (2017): special thanks
- Splatoon 2 (2017): special thanks
- Xenoblade Chronicles 2 (2017): artwork
- The Legend of Zelda: Tears of the Kingdom (2023): special thanks
