= Eternal Sonata =

2007 video game

- Xbox 360 cover art used in North America and Europe
- Developer: tri-Crescendo
- Publisher: Namco Bandai Games (Note: Released under the Namco brand outside North America.)
- Director: Hiroya Hatsushiba
- Producers: Hideo Baba; Shinji Noguchi
- Artist: Nozomi Shibahara
- Writer: Hiroya Hatsushiba
- Composer: Motoi Sakuraba
- Platforms: Xbox 360, PlayStation 3
- Release: Xbox 360: JP: June 14, 2007; NA: September 17, 2007; EU: October 19, 2007; AU: November 12, 2007; PlayStation 3: JP: September 18, 2008; NA: October 21, 2008; EU: February 13, 2009; AU: February 19, 2009
- Genre: Role-playing
- Modes: Single-player, multiplayer

Eternal Sonata (Note: Japanese: トラスティベル 〜ショパンの夢〜, Hepburn: Torasuti Beru ~Shopan no Yume~; Trusty Bell: Chopin's Dream) is a role-playing video game developed by tri-Crescendo and published by Bandai Namco Games. The game was originally released on Xbox 360 in 2007, followed by an expanded version releasing on PlayStation 3 the following year.

The story follows the Polish romantic pianist and composer Frédéric Chopin, who died of tuberculosis at the age of 39, and his adventure in a fictional world that he dreams of as he is dying, which is influenced by his life and music and in which he and others are playable characters. The game's battle system focuses on musical elements and character-unique special attacks. Light and darkness affect the appearance and abilities of enemies on the battlefield, as well as the types of magic that can be cast.

The game features a selection of Chopin's compositions performed by pianist Stanislav Bunin, with original compositions composed and arranged by Motoi Sakuraba. It is notable for its use of classical piano pieces, educational cutscenes featuring real paintings and photographs, in contrast to its cel-shaded graphics, and lush landscape design.

== Gameplay ==
Eternal Sonata follows general conventions of the role-playing genre; the player controls a party of up to twelve characters to explore the world, interact with its inhabitants, buy and sell equipment at shops, and encounter monsters while in the field. These encounters are visible and the player can choose to avoid the encounter, if possible, as well as gain the advantage in battle by approaching them from behind. Experience points are awarded to all members of the party, though at a reduced rate for those not involved in combat, and characters improve in various statistics and learn special combat skills as they level up. Weapons, armor, and accessories can be used to improve these statistics, which can be purchased through money earned in combat, found in chests, or by selling equipment and photographs which Beat can take during battle. The player can also find Score Pieces scattered about the world, which represent short musical phrases. Various NPCs in the game will offer to perform with the party, requiring the player to match a Score Piece to the phrase they offer, with the resulting composition being ranked. Discordant matches will result in no reward, but close or perfect matches will gain a bonus item from the NPC.

=== Combat ===
Combat in Eternal Sonata takes place in both lit and shaded areas, affecting the skills the player can use.

While the main combat system is turn-based, using only three characters within the party, it also incorporates elements of an action game. Each character's turn is preceded by "Tactical Time", a period of time during which the player decides what action they take. Once the player initiates an action or "Tactical Time" expires, a function of the Party Class Level, they have a limited amount of time, indicated by an Action Gauge, to move the character, attack the enemy, or use recovery skills or items. Regular attacks are made at melee or ranged distances depending on the character's weapon and add to the Action Gauge as well as to the party's "Echoes" meter. Special skills, which include offensive attacks and recovery skills, consume generated Echoes, with the effect becoming more powerful with more Echoes. When a character defends against an attack, there is a short period before the attack where the player can press a button to block some damage from the attack or to counterattack and interrupt the monster's turn. Recovery and other one-time-use items are stored in a common pouch with a limited capacity; the player must "set" items in the pouch so that they can be cycled through and triggered during battle.

Light and dark areas on the battlefield, created by the time of day, environment, and the shadows of characters and monsters, affect combat. Party members have special skills that are active in lit and dark areas, with the effect changing depending on the area. Monsters also have powers depending on whether the area is lit or dark, while others will change form when moving between lit and dark areas. The player can manipulate the nature of areas using special items, but this can also be affected by monsters or by dynamic changes on the battlefield, such as the shadow of a cloud moving across the ground.

As the player progresses through the game, they increase their Party Class Level, which grants bonuses but imposes limitations on combat. For example, one Party Class improvement increases the number of slots for character's special skills, but reduces the amount of Tactical Time and time available in the Action Gauge. The Level cannot be altered by the player in their first playthrough, but can be adjusted in Encore Mode.

== Plot ==
The game takes place mainly within Chopin's dream world, with brief segments in the real world where he is on his deathbed. The story is divided into eight chapters, each represented by one of Chopin's compositions and related to events in his life. The dream sequences combine the game's fictional narrative with elements drawn from Chopin's biography and musical works.

Chopin meets Polka, a young girl who possesses magic and will soon die from her illness. She also sells floral powder, but her business is being threatened by the introduction of the cheaper mineral powder, which is mined by Forte's ruler, Count Waltz. After being shunned by the citizens of Ritardando, who believe that her magic is related to her illness, she decides that she wants to do something with her life before she dies. The party sets out to meet with Count Waltz regarding the mineral powder and to stop the mining of Mt. Rock, which is damaging Agogo Forest. Over time, they learn that Waltz intends to use the mineral powder to create an army of soldiers and lead an insurrection against Forte's enemy, Baroque. They head for Forte, but are stopped and taken to its dungeon, as it was alerted to the arrival of the rebel group Andantino. After escaping, the party meets up with Andantino, but is spotted by Forte personnel and escapes by jumping off of a bridge into a river. Half of the party and Andantino head for their hideout Andante, while the other half is rescued by Prince Crescendo of Baroque. Upon reaching Baroque, the party discusses the situation, as Forte threatens war, but Baroque wants peace. Crescendo considers a plan to assassinate Count Waltz, but it is soon discarded.

That half of the party returns to Ritardando to reunite with the party, while Allegretto leaves to retrieve Polka from her village. The party heads for Baroque and decides to explore Aria Temple; upon returning to Baroque, they find that Crescendo and Serenade are missing and learn that they left for Forte to turn themselves in to prevent war. On their way to Forte, they fight Crescendo, Serenade, and Count Waltz, who completes a potion that transforms his partner, Legato, into a monster. Realizing that the world is in danger, the party follows Waltz and Legato to the city of the dead, Elegy Of The Moon, where souls lost to the mineral powder dwell. At Double Reed Tower, they fight and defeat them before facing Chopin, who he believes that this is the only way to put his soul to rest. Realizing that it is the only way to save the world, Polka jumps off a cliff and is reborn younger, but soon ages and embraces Allegretto. Back in the real world, Chopin dies and he plays his piano in a blooming sea of nocturnal flowers called 'Heaven's Mirror', composing a song inspired by Polka.

=== Characters ===
Characters in Eternal Sonata, with the exception of real-world people such as Chopin, are named after musical terms.

- Frédéric François Chopin (フレデリック・フランソワ・ショパン, Furederikku Furansowa Shopan): A renowned composer and pianist who meets Polka in the dream world and decides to help her. Over the course of the story, he begins to question whether or not the dream world is reality. He is 39 years old, the age Chopin was when he died.
  Voiced by: Mitsuaki Madono (Japanese); Patrick Seitz (English)
- Polka (ポルカ, Poruka): A young girl who sells floral powder in Ritardando. She possesses powerful magic abilities, which will soon kill her and have caused her to be shunned by others. Despite this, she seeks to do something with her life before she dies while using her magic to help others. She is 14 years old, the same age that Chopin's sister Emilia was when she died.
  Voiced by: Aya Hirano (Japanese); Erin Fitzgerald (English)
- Allegretto (アレグレット, Areguretto): A thief who is kind and steals to feed children who cannot feed themselves. While he knows that this is not a permanent solution, he does so in hopes that they will not go hungry or poor like he has.
  Voiced by: Hiro Shimono (Japanese); Sam Riegel (English)
- Beat (ビート, Bīto): A boy who lives with Allegretto in Ritardando and treasures the camera his father gave him. He is cheerful and gets along well with others.
  Voiced by: Yumiko Kobayashi (Japanese); Mona Marshall (English)
- Viola (ビオラ, Biora): A shepherd who the party meets in the countryside. She is a tough talker and, due to being older than the others, can fend for herself. She has a pet named Arco, who tags along with the group.
  Voiced by: Hoko Kuwashima (Japanese); Megan Hollingshead (English)
- Salsa (サルサ, Sarusa): A guardian of the Agogo Forest along with her sister March, who the party meets while imprisoned in Forte Castle's dungeons. She is brash, outspoken, and energetic.
  Voiced by: Mika Kanai (Japanese); Amy Gross (English)
- March (マーチ, Māchi): Salsa's twin sister and a guardian of the Agogo Forest. In contrast to Salsa, she is more reasonable and gentle.
  Voiced by: Chiwa Saito (Japanese); Amy Gross (English)
- Jazz (ジルバ, Jiruba; his Japanese name is a transliteration of "jitterbug"): The leader of the revolutionary group Andantino, who is quiet and serious and worries about the damage Count Waltz is causing through mineral powder and the processes to mine it.
  Voiced by: Joji Nakata (Japanese); D.C. Douglas (English)
- Falsetto (ファルセット, Farusetto): Jazz's lieutenant in Andantino, who is perceptive and tough and has known him since childhood.
  Voiced by: Tomoe Hanba (Japanese); Julie Ann Taylor (English)
- Claves (クラベス, Kurabesu): Jazz's girlfriend and a soldier of Andantino, who is also a spy for Forte but comes to regret her position. She is later murdered by Rondo for treason, but can be revived.
  Voiced by: Mie Sonozaki (Japanese); Tara Platt (English)
- Crescendo (クレッシェンド, Kuresshendo): The prince of Baroque, who replaces his father as Baroque's leader due to his sickness and later rescues Polka, Beat, Chopin, and Salsa after they fall into Adagio River. He is playable in the PlayStation 3 version.
  Voiced by: Katsuyuki Konishi (Japanese); Cam Clarke (English)
- Serenade (セレナーデ, Serenāde): Prince Crescendo's fiancée, who initially works as a spy for Forte, but leaves Forte to join Baroque. She is playable in the PlayStation 3 version.
  Voiced by: Fumiko Orikasa (Japanese); Stephanie Sheh (English)

== Development ==
Director Hiroya Hatsushiba stated:

People who play games and people who love classical music are not necessarily sharing [the] same type of interests. Most people in Japan know the name of [Frederic] Chopin; however, most of the people who know of Chopin think he is just some kind of a great music composer without knowing any more about him. Most of them have heard Chopin's music but not a lot could put his name to it immediately. By creating a colorful fantasy world in Chopin's dream, I was hoping that people would get into this game easily and also come to know how great Chopin's music is.

For the localization, the game's text was proofread by the Frédéric Chopin Society in Warsaw. The localization team wanted to be as historically accurate as possible, without losing the original message of the script.

ESRB posted their rating for Eternal Sonata in April 2007, listing the game as being intended for release on Xbox 360 and PlayStation 3. However, when news of this quickly spread, the ESRB removed the listing entirely. On September 11, Bandai Namco's official site listed Eternal Sonata as coming soon to PlayStation 3, yet also listed the Xbox 360 version as being "available now". Again, as news quickly spread, the information was removed. The following day, scans from Famitsu were released, confirming the game as being released for the PlayStation 3. Bandai Namco later officially confirmed Eternal Sonata for the PlayStation 3, and was scheduled for release in 2008.

There are features exclusive for the PlayStation 3 version. This includes new playable characters, Crescendo and Serenade, who played a major role in the plot of the game, but were not playable in the Xbox 360 version. It also includes a new clothing system, in which the player can freely change a few characters' costumes, specifically those of Allegretto, Beat and Polka – the three characters that are controllable in the field at various points in the game. The other extras are the two dungeons, Lament Mirror and Church of EZI, the former of which is compulsory.

Eternal Sonata features a large soundtrack, mostly composed by Motoi Sakuraba, with seven of Chopin's compositions performed by Russian pianist Stanislav Bunin and presented in 5.1 surround sound. Featured music of Chopin's include Étude Op. 10, No. 12, Étude Op. 10, No. 3 and Polonaise Op. 53. A Japanese aria composed by Sakuraba titled "Heaven's Mirror" (鏡天花, Kyōtenka) is also performed by Akiko Shinada for the soundtrack. The game's background music was released in Japan as the four-disc album Trusty Bell: Chopin's Dream Original Score (トラスティベル 〜ショパンの夢〜 オリジナルスコア, Torasuti Beru ~Shopan no Yume~ Orijinaru Sukoa) on July 25, 2007, under the King Records label.

== Manga ==
A manga adaptation of Eternal Sonata was drawn by Mimei Kuroi and published by ASCII Media Works under their Dengeki Comics comic imprint, and the chapters were collected into a single tankōbon on September 27, 2008. While it deviates from the game's story drastically, it does reach the same conclusion; in addition, Viola, Falsetto and Claves do not appear at any point in the manga due to the condensation of the altered story, and the roles of Salsa and March are greatly reduced, with the two appearing only briefly and not joining the party.

== Reception ==
Reception

Aggregate scores
Aggregator	Score
GameRankings	X360: 80% PS3: 82%
Metacritic	X360: 79/100; PS3: 80/100

Famitsu rated the game 9/9/9/8, for a total score of 35/40. During its release week, the Xbox 360 version the game reached second place on the Japanese sales charts at 49,334 copies. The following week, it had dropped to 35th. The PlayStation 3 version debuted on Japanese sales charts at number four with around 34,000 copies sold. Famitsu reported that year-end Japanese sales of the game reached about 70,435 copies on the Xbox 360 in 2007 and 53,314 copies on the PlayStation 3 in 2008.

At E3 2007, it won GameTrailers's award for Best Role-Playing Game and IGN's award for Best Original Score on Xbox 360, and was a runner-up in Best RPG, Best Artistic Design on Xbox 360 and Best Use Of Sound on Xbox 360.

In 2007, Eternal Sonata was nominated for Spike Video Game Awards for Best RPG, but lost to Mass Effect.

In 2008, the Academy of Interactive Arts & Sciences named Eternal Sonata as one of the nominees for 2007's "Role-Playing Game of the Year", but eventually lost to Mass Effect.

In Europe and the U.S., it received many high reviews. GameRankings gave the PlayStation 3 version an average aggregate score of 82% based on 28 reviews, and the Xbox 360 version 80% based on 59 reviews. Metacritic gave the PlayStation 3 version an average aggregate score of 80/100 based on 34 reviews, and the Xbox 360 version 79/100 based on 56 reviews. GameSpot gave it an 8.5 out of 10, praising its magnificent visual design, stunning musical score, inventive battle system and great cast, though it admitted that the story is completely linear. IGN gave the Xbox 360 version an 8.3 out of 10, claiming that it had some of the best visuals on the 360 and had great combat. They also said that "the soundtrack is astounding" and claimed the story did a great job of educating the player about Frédéric Chopin, but the game was criticized for its linearity and for the lack of exploration. IGN gave the PlayStation 3 version a higher 8.7 out of 10 and the Editor's Choice Award, with praise for its extension of the storyline, the inclusion of new playable characters, and the inclusion of other extras, such as new dungeons and customizable characters. X-Play gave the game a 3 out of 5 praising the combat, soundtrack and visuals but complained that there were too many mini games, a poor story and too many role-playing video game clichés. Johansen Quijano-Cruz of Eludamos: Journal for Computer Game Culture reviewed the game from an artistic and literary perspective, praising it as an excellent role-playing game, particularly for the social criticism conveyed by its storyline. He regards it as a primary example of a video game that "makes powerful statements about the society in which we live" and "incorporates, analyzes, interprets, and offers critical commentary of certain aspects of society".

== Music ==
The music is mostly featured a classical piano compositions.
