= Tales of Xillia 2 =

2012 video game

- North American cover art
- Developer: Bandai Namco Studios
- Publisher: Bandai Namco Games
- Directors: Kenji Anabuki; Asana Inoki
- Producer: Hideo Baba
- Artists: Kōsuke Fujishima (character); Mutsumi Inomata (character); Daigo Okumura (character)
- Writers: Naoki Yamamoto; Daisuke Kiga
- Composer: Motoi Sakuraba
- Series: Tales
- Platform: PlayStation 3
- Release: JP: November 1, 2012; NA: August 19, 2014; EU: August 22, 2014
- Genre: Action role-playing game
- Modes: Single-player, multiplayer

Tales of Xillia 2 (Note: Tales of Xillia 2 (Japanese: テイルズ オブ エクシリア2, Hepburn: Teiruzu obu Ekushiria 2)) is an action role-playing game for the PlayStation 3 released on November 1, 2012, in Japan. It is the fourteenth core product in the Tales series and was developed and published by Bandai Namco Games. The game was localized for North America and Europe in August 2014.

The game takes place after Tales of Xillia and follows Ludger Will Kresnik; the Kresnik family has the ability to infiltrate and destroy parallel dimensions. Since the spirit Origin is unable to support the abundance of souls, a famous company hires Ludger to destroy these dimensions to keep the world in balance. The game's central theme is Sentaku ga Mirai wo Tsumugu RPG (選択が未来を紡ぐRPG, lit. "An RPG where your choices spin the future").

== Gameplay ==
Tales of Xillia 2 consists primarily of two major areas: the field map and the battle screen. The field map is a realistically scaled 3D environment where the player character traverses and interacts with non-player characters, items, or mob avatars. On the field map, character interactions between the party can also be viewed in the form of a sketch story; these sketch stories are referred to as skits and consist of animated portraits and voice acting. When coming into contact with a mob avatar, the environment switches to the battle screen, a 3D representation of an area in which the player commands the characters in battles against the CPU-controlled mobs.

During battle sequences, the game uses the Cross Dual Raid Linear Motion Battle System, a similar system to the prequel. Four characters from the party are chosen to battle and characters not controlled by a player are controlled by artificial intelligence with instructions set by the players beforehand. The enemy mob's number, appearances and behavior vary and are dependent on the mob's avatar. Both sides' objective is to deplete the other side's health points (HP) using attacks and skills. When a party member's health falls to zero, the party member faints until revived with items, by a healer, or resting at an inn on the field map; Mobs with zero HP disappear from the arena. Killing all the mobs will yield experience points, items, and allows the player to return to the field map. If all four participating party members are defeated, a game over will occur.

Battles take place in real-time. Player actions include moving, dashing, standard attacks, and artes; artes are special attacks which consume "Technical Points" (TP), the in-game synonym for magic points. Dashing, standard attacks, and artes usage are also restricted by the "Assault Counter" (AC), a synonym for action points. Party members are able to link to each other to perform unified attacks called linked artes. While linked, the supporting partner provides unique abilities to the character, while also increasing the Linked Artes Gauge. When the Linked Artes Gauge is full, the player character can enter Over Limit which gives them immunity to stagger, unlimited AC, and allows them to use linked artes in succession.

== Plot ==
The game takes place a year after the first Tales of Xillia. Under orders from her father to find the mystical Land of Canaan, Elle Mel Marta boards a train which is hijacked before its departure. Ludger Will Kresnik follows her onboard and works with Jude Mathis to retake the train. The train crashes and the resulting medical treatment from Spirius Corporation puts Ludger in debt. Aware of the Kresnik family's ability to destroy parallel dimensions, Spirius CEO, Bisley Karscy Bakur, hires Ludger for this purpose since the spirit Origin can no longer sustain the abundance of souls in the worlds. At the same time, Ludger searches for his brother, Julius Will Kresnik, who has been declared the train hijacking's instigator.

As Ludger works for Spirius, he is joined by the protagonists from Tales of Xillia in addition to Gaius and Muzét. It is slowly revealed that the world's current predicament is a millennia aged trial arranged by the spirits Origin, Maxwell, and Chronos, as a test on whether humanity was worth preserving. The first person to reach the Land of Canaan will have a wish granted by Origin. As part of the trial, Chronos gave the Kresnik their powers called Chromatus; overusing the Chromatus turns the user into a divergence catalyst which is the core of a parallel dimension. If the number of dimensions reach a million, Origin will release a miasma which will kill everything but spirits. In addition, a special Kresnik is born every generation with the power to take items from parallel dimensions and is dubbed the Key of Kresnik. To reach Canaan, a Key of Kresnik must obtain five objects, called Waymarkers, from parallel dimension. Having used Elle's Key of Kresnik powers, Ludger is able to gather four Waymarkers. In search of the final Waymarker, the party learns that Elle originates from a parallel dimension and her father, Victor, is a Waymarker and that dimension's Ludger. Victor tries to kill Ludger to replace him in the prime dimension but is killed instead.

With all five Waymarkers gathered, the entrance to Canaan is revealed. Bisley takes Elle with him to Canaan, intending to use Origin's wish to enslave spirits. With Julius' sacrifice, the party follows and defeats Bisley. The party uses Origin's wish to destroy all parallel dimensions and Ludger is given a choice resulting in two endings: If Ludger does nothing, Elle's transformation into a divergence catalyst causes her to disappear with the other dimensions. Years later, Ludger is the CEO of Spirius and meets Lara Mel Marta during a business deal. If Ludger offers his life to save Elle's, Ludger disappears with the other dimensions. Years later, an adult Elle highlights the party's accomplishments.

== Development and release ==
On May 9, 2012, Weekly Shōnen Jump announced a Tales game will be revealed on June 2, 2012. On May 14, 2012, Bandai Namco Games opened a website counting down to the reveal. Hideo Baba described the game as more modernized than past games and the phrase "Are you prepared to destroy the world for the girl?" as a tie to the game's plot. On the reveal date, Tales of Xillia 2 was revealed along with its new characters and battle system. The game will also have a bundle with a specially designed DualShock 3. The day after, the official site revealed the game's central theme is revealed to be Sentaku ga Mirai wo Tsumugu RPG (選択が未来を紡ぐRPG, lit. "An RPG where your choices spin the future"). On June 27, 2012, Baba announced the game's release date for November 1, 2012, during a live broadcast. On July 18, 2012, Baba stated there were no Western localization plans at the time but expressed interest in localizing the game to complement with the prequel's English localization. Between August 1 and 7, Bandai Namco Games hosted a survey on Famitsu to determine which version of the game's demo will be playable at an event. On September 23, 2012, the games theme song is revealed to be "Song 4 U" by Ayumi Hamasaki, with the Japanese vocals being retained in the Western release. On July 6, 2013, a localization for North America and Europe was announced. The localization was announced to be released on August 19 and 22 in North America and Europe, respectively.

=== Conception ===
The concept for Tales of Xillia 2 originated during the development of the original Xillia, but did not enter active development, instead undergoing extensive conceptual work in preparation for production should it be called for. Active development began in 2011, after Xillia was completed. The game was the first mainline Tales title to be developed by Bandai Namco Studio, a studio founded as an in-house development environment after Namco Tales Studio was absorbed into its parent company in 2011.

Baba conceived the game's plot while thinking about Tales of Xillia's plot and imagined what the history and aftermath of Xillia was like. Because a large proportion of the world and lore of Xillia had only been referred to in speech or text, the decision was made to create a sequel, with a central theme inspired by the choices that must be made by people in both casual and dire situations. A choice mechanic was implemented to help players form a deeper connection with Ludger. Several concepts for alternate timelines went unused, and the original plot differed substantially from that in the final product. The script was handled by multiple writers: Naoki Yamamoto, who had handled Xillia's side events, wrote the main scenario. Daisuke Kiga, Xillia's main scenario writer, handled the character scenarios. Other writers also contributed to add to the variety of the script. A silent protagonist was chosen so the main character would feel like a full extension of the player. Ludger's transforming abilities and debt needed to be created through cooperation between the writers and designers.

=== Downloadable content ===
Tales of Xillia's downloadable content is usable in Tales of Xillia 2. Aside from the prequel's content, Tales of Xillia 2 offers new costumes for the playable characters. A preorder bonus for the game is a costume of Emil Castagnier for Ludger. The first print of the game contains a Yuri Lowell costume for Jude and an Asbel Lhant costume for Milla. On the game's release date, a Code Geass costume set was made available. On November 8, a hairstyle and a sports theme set were made available. On November 15 there were four sets of DLC released: a Puella Magi Madoka Magica costume set for Milla, Elize, and Leia; A school themed set and a swimsuit set were released for Ludger, Gaius, and Muzét; and a set of doll attachments were released. On November 22, a Tales set for Ludger, Gaius, and Muzét were released to make them resemble other characters from the Tales series. On the same day, a hat set and an additional set of doll attachments were released.

== Media adaptations ==
=== Manga ===
Tales of Xillia 2 spawned four manga adaptions: two anthology series and two traditional manga series. The first anthology series is Tales of Xillia Yonkoma Kings (Note: テイルズ オブ エクシリア 4コマ Kings, Teiruzu obu Ekushiria Yonkoma Kings) by Ichijinsha with two volumes released in February 2013 and January 2014. The second is Tales of Xillia 2 Comic Anthology (Note: テイルズ オブ エクシリア2 コミックアンソロジー, Teiruzu obu Ekushiria 2 Komikku Ansorojī) by DNA Media Comics which released a volume in March 2013.

The Tales of Xillia 2 manga series is an adaption of the game's storyline. Its prelude was published in the December 2012 issue of Viva Tales of Magazine. It began serialization in Dengeki Maoh beginning January 2013. The series Tales of Xillia 2: Bipolar Crossroads (Note: テイルズ オブ エクシリア2 双極のクロスロード, Teiruzu obu ekushiria 2 Sōkyoku no Kurosurōdo) is published by ASCII Media Works. It takes place between the first and second Xillia games and follows Jude and Alvin.

=== Books ===
Tales of Xillia 2 had three different strategy guides published; one each from Yamashita Books, Shueisha, and Enterbrain. The book Tales of Xillia 2 Official World Guidance (Note: テイルズ オブ エクシリア2 公式設定資料集, Teiruzu obu Ekushiria 2 Kōshiki Settei Shiryōshū) was released by Yamashita Books and details the in-universe information of the game. It was released on March 2, 2013. Tales of Xillia 2 Official Scenario Book (Note: テイルズ オブ エクシリア2 公式シナリオブック, Teiruzu obu Ekushiria 2 Kōshiki Shinario Bukku) was published by Bandai Namco Games and Yamashita Books. It details the in-game plot and acts as a guide.

=== Audio CDs ===
A drama CD called Anthology Drama CD: Tales of Xillia 2 2013 Winter (Note: アンソロジードラマCD テイルズ オブ エクシリア2 2013 Winter, Ansorojī Dorama CD Teiruzu obu Ekushiria 2 2013 Winter) by Frontier Works was released in January 2014. Tales of Xillia 2 Original Soundtrack (Note: テイルズ オブ エクシリア2 オリジナル･サウンドトラック, Teiruzu obu Ekushiria 2 Orijinaru Saundotorakku) was released by Avex Group on November 2, 2012, in a regular and limited edition. It peaked 87th on Oricon's charts.

== Reception ==
Reception

Aggregate scores
Aggregator	Score
GameRankings	70.50%
Metacritic	71/100

Review scores
Publication	Score
Famitsu	35/40
Hardcore Gamer	4/5

Award
Publication	Award
Japan Game Awards	Future Division Award

Tales of Xillia 2 was received with generally positive reviews, albeit usually lower than its predecessor. It sold half a million copies in Japan and failed to meet Namco Bandai Game's target sales. Famitsu's review of the game was positive and commented on how the game will meet expectations of fans of the series. Hardcore Gamer gave the game a 4/5, calling it a "well-designed RPG bursting with content." It was also well received in western releases.
