= Legend (disambiguation) =

A legend is a historical narrative, a symbolic representation of folk belief.

Legend(s) or The Legend(s) may also refer to:

== Businesses and brands ==
- Legend (comic imprint), a comic-book brand-name
- Legend (TV channel), a British TV channel, formerly the Horror Channel
- Legend, brand name used in Europe by American boat manufacturer Hunter Marine
- LEGEND, a brand of fur of the American Legend Cooperative
- Legend Books, an imprint of Random House
- Legend Entertainment, a former American computer game developer
- Legend Group Ltd., the former name of the Lenovo Group, a Chinese technology company
- HTC Legend, a smartphone by the HTC Corporation
- Legends Hospitality, a food, beverage, merchandise retail and stadium operations corporation
- Legends Outlets Kansas City, a super-regional shopping mall

== Film ==
- Legend (1985 film), a fantasy-film starring Tom Cruise, Mia Sara, and Tim Curry
- Fong Sai-yuk (film) (The Legend, 1993), and its sequel, Fong Sai-yuk II
- The Legend (2005 film), a Finnish short documentary
- The Legend (2012 film), directed by Christian Lara featuring Barry Primus
- Legend (2014 film), an Indian film starring Nandamuri Balakrishna, Sonal Chauhan, and Radhika Apte
- Legend (2015 film), a biographical film of the Kray Twins, starring Tom Hardy and Emily Browning
- The Legend (2022 film), an Indian science-fiction film
- A Legend, a 2024 action fantasy film starring Jackie Chan

== Games ==
=== Video games ===
- Legend (1984 video game), for the ZX Spectrum; see Andrew Glaister
- Legend (1992 video game), for the PC, Atari ST and Commodore Amiga
- Legend (1994 video game), for the Super Nintendo Entertainment System
- Burnout Legends, a 2005 Burnout video game
- Tomb Raider: Legend, 2006
- Rayman Legends, a 2013 platform game
- Asphalt Legends, a 2018 Asphalt video game
- Pokémon Legends, a subseries of the core series of Pokémon games

=== Other games ===
- Legends, playing card set; see Magic: The Gathering expansion sets, 1993–1995
- Legends (play-by-mail game), moderated by Harlequin Games

== Literature ==
=== Books ===
- Legend (Gemmell novel), a 1984 fantasy novel by David Gemmell
- Legend (Lu novel), the first novel in Legend: The Series: A trilogy by Marie Lu
- Legends: The Enchanted, a graphic novel published by Radical Comics
- Legends (anthology), a 1998 collection of short novels edited by Robert Silverberg
  - Legends II (anthology), a 2003 second collection
- Dragonlance Legends, trilogy of books central to the Dragonlance series
- The Legend, a 1969 novel by Evelyn Anthony
- Legend: The Secret World of Lee Harvey Oswald, 1978, by Edward Jay Epstein

=== Other literature ===
- Legends (comics), comic-book limited series published by DC Comics
- Legend (comic imprint), a comic-book brand-name
- Legend (play), a 1976 Broadway play by Samuel A. Taylor
- "Legend" (poem), 1950, by Judith Wright
- Legend Books, an imprint of Random House
- Legends!, a 1986 stage play by James Kirkwood, Jr.

== Music ==
=== Albums ===
- Legend (Bob Marley and the Wailers album), 1984
- Lennon Legend, a posthumous album of greatest hits of John Lennon
- Legend (Robin of Sherwood soundtrack), by Irish group Clannad
- Legend (Tangerine Dream soundtrack), U.S. version of the soundtrack to the 1985 film
- Legend (film score), European version of the soundtrack by Jerry Goldsmith, for the 1985 film
- Legend (Henry Cow album), 1973
- Legend (Jannabi album), 2019
- Legend (Legend Seven album), 1992
- Legend (Lynyrd Skynyrd album), 1987
- Legend (Poco album), 1978
- Legend (MC Lyte album), 2015
- Legend (Two Steps from Hell album), 2008
- Legend (Witchcraft album), 2012
- Legend (House of Pain EP), 1994
- Legend (Abigail Williams EP), 2006
- Legend, the title of three different albums by rockabilly band Legend, fronted by Mickey Jupp
- Legends (Above the Law album), 1998
- Legends (Benny Carter album), 1993
- Legends (Bob Catley album), 1999
- Legends (Beverley Craven album), 2005
- Legends (Five Star album), 2005
- Legends (Sabaton album), 2025
- Legends (Dvořák), orchestral composition by Antonín Dvořák
- The Legend (Count Basie album), 1961
- The Legend (Joe Cocker album), 1992
- The Legend (Johnny Cash box set), 2005, by Johnny Cash

=== Songs ===
- "Legend" (Tchaikovsky), composition by Pyotr Ilyich Tchaikovsky, 1883
- "Legend" (Mika Nakashima song), 2004
- "Legend", by Alma from Heavy Rules Mixtape, 2018
- "Legend", by Attila from Chaos, 2016
- "Legend", by Chronixx from Chronology, 2017
- "Legend", by Dance Gavin Dance from Instant Gratification, 2015
- "Legend", by Drake from If You're Reading This It's Too Late, 2015
- "Legend", by G-Eazy from The Beautiful & Damned, 2017
- "Legend", by House of Pain from Legend, 1994
- "Legend", by Mike Oldfield from the B-side of "Pictures in the Dark", 1985
- "Legend", by Nelly Furtado from Whoa, Nelly!, 2000
- "Legend", by Poco from Legend, 1978
- "Legend", by Snoop Dogg from Coolaid, 2016
- "Legend", by Twenty One Pilots from Trench, 2018
- "Legend", by Upchurch from King of Dixie, 2017
- "Legend", by The Score, 2017
- "The Legend", by Jerry Reed for Smokey and the Bandit, 1977
- "The Legend", by Pallbearer from Sorrow and Extinction, 2012
- "The Legend", a 2018 track by Toby Fox from Deltarune Chapter 1 OST from the video game Deltarune
- "Legends" (Juice Wrld song), 2018
- "Legends" (Kelsea Ballerini song), 2017
- "Legends" (Quavo and Lil Baby song), 2025
- "Legends", by The Afters from Live On Forever, 2016
- "Legends", by Sleeping with Sirens from Gossip, 2017

=== Bands ===
- Legend, original name of Christian rock band Legend Seven
- Legend, a rockabilly band fronted by Mickey Jupp
- Legend (Icelandic band), Icelandic rock band
- The Legend (band), South Korean band
- The Legends, a band of Sam McCue before forming Crowfoot
- The Legends, one of several early bands of Gram Parsons
- The Legends, first band of Dan Hartman
- The Legends (Swedish band)
- The Legends (Tejano band)

=== Other uses in music ===
- The Legend (opera), a 1919 one-act tragic opera by Joseph Carl Breil

== Television ==
=== Episodes ===
- "Legend", NCIS season 6, episodes 22–23 (2009)
- "Legends" (Avatar: The Last Airbender), season 1, episode 8 (2024)
- "Legends", Dance Academy series 2, episode 4 (2012)
- "Legends", Drunk History season 4, episode 2 (2016)
- "Legends", Justice League season 1, episodes 18–19 (2002)
- "Legends", Spartacus: Blood and Sand episode 3 (2010)
- "Legends", The Invisible Man (2000) season 2, episode 1 (2001)
- "Legends", The Loud House season 2, episode 43a (2017)
- "Legends", Tornado Chasers season 2, episode 2 (2013)
- "Legends", Walker, Texas Ranger season 8, episode 18 (2001)
- "The Legend", Black Tie Nights season 1, episode 10 (2004)
- "The Legend", Cars on the Road episode 4 (2022)
- "The Legend", Gunsmoke season 17, episode 6 (1971)
- "The Legend", Invasion America episode 1 (1998)
- "The Legend", Lavender Castle episode 19 (2000)
- "The Legend", Mission: Impossible (1966) season 1, episode 20 (1967)
- "The Legend" (Prison Break), season 4, episode 10 (2008)
- "The Legend", Qumi-Qumi season 1, episode 1 (2011)
- "The Legend", Tales of Zestiria the X season 2, episode 13 (2017)
- "The Legend", The Waltons season 1, episode 10 (1972)
- "The Legend", They Came from Outer Space episode 10 (1991)
- "The Legend", Wander Over Yonder season 2, episode 16a (2016)
- "The Legend", Wanted Dead or Alive season 1, episode 27 (1959)

=== Shows ===
- Legend (TV series), a 1995 science fiction Western television series
- Legends of the Hidden Temple, a 1993-1995 American action-adventure television game show
- The Legend (TV series), a 2007 South Korean historical fantasy television series
- Legends (TV series), a 2014 American crime drama television series, based on the 2005 Robert Littell book
- The Legends (TV series), a 2019 Chinese romance
- Marvel Studios: Legends, a 2021 television series from Marvel Studios
- MasterChef: Legends, the eleventh season (2021) of FOX's reality culinary show MasterChef
- Legends (2026 TV series), a television series, for Netflix from Neil Forsyth

=== Other uses in television ===
- Legend (TV channel), a British TV channel, formerly the Horror Channel
- Ghost Chips, actually Legend, a New Zealand public service announcement

== People ==
- Everett True (born 1961), English music journalist and musician, aka The Legend
- Bill Legend (born 1944), English musician, drummer for T. Rex
- John Legend (born 1978), American singer, songwriter, musician and actor
- Johnny Legend (1948–2026), American rockabilly musician, film producer, actor and wrestling manager
- Tobi Legend (born 1942), American-born Canadian soul and gospel singer

== Transport ==
=== Aircraft ===
- Aeropilot Legend 540, a Czech ultralight aircraft
- Turbine Legend, a US kit monoplane

=== Cars ===
- Honda Legend, a Honda car model now marketed as Acura RL
- Acura Legend, another car marketed as Honda Legend outside North America
- Mahindra Legend, a four-wheel-drive vehicle
- Legends car racing, a motor racing series based on 1930s and 1940s American automobiles

=== Motorcycles ===
- Triumph Legend TT, a 4 stroke-engined motorcycle from Triumph

=== Watercraft ===
- Legend, brand name used in Europe by American boat manufacturer Hunter Marine
- Carnival Legend, a 2001 Spirit class cruise ship operated by Carnival Cruise Line

== Other uses ==
- Legend, a fictitious identity used in espionage
- Legend, Alberta, an unincorporated community in Alberta, Canada
- Legend (map), a guide to a map's symbology
- Legend (chart), a guide to colours and symbols used in a data chart, graph, plot or diagram
- Legend (numismatics), a formal inscription such as is found around the margin of a coin or seal
- <LEGEND>, an HTML element used to create a frame around other elements
- The Legend (roller coaster), at Holiday World in Santa Claus, Indiana
- Star Wars Legends, an alternate, decanonized continuity in the Star Wars franchise

== See also ==
- Legendary (disambiguation)
- Legende (disambiguation)
- American Legend (disambiguation)
