= List of Tales of Zestiria the X episodes =

Tales of Zestiria the X
- Native name
- Kanji: テイルズ オブ ゼスティリア ザ X(クロス)
- Revised Hepburn: Teiruzu Obu Zesutiria Za Kurosu
- No. of episodes: 26

Release
- Original network: Tokyo MX, Sun TV, KBS, TV Aichi, BS11
- Original release: July 3, 2016 – April 29, 2017

Tales of Zestiria the X is an anime television series based on the Tales of Zestiria and Tales of Berseria video games developed by Bandai Namco Studios and tri-Crescendo and published by Bandai Namco Entertainment. The series was produced by Ufotable and announced at the Tales of Festival 2015. The original plans for the anime was about Tales of Berseria and its promotion before its release, hence the reason why the game makes an adapted appearance. The series is directed by Haruo Sotozaki and written by Hikaru Kondo. Akira Matsushima adapted the original character designs for the anime, while the art director is Minji Kim. The music is composed by Motoi Sakuraba and Go Shiina. The main voice actors from the game reprised their roles in the series except for Lailah's voice actress Miyu Matsuki, who died in 2015 and was replaced by Noriko Shitaya. The series was originally announced for broadcast sometime in July 2016.

The series aired from July 3, 2016, to September 25, 2016. The opening theme is "Kaze no Uta" by Flow, while the ending theme was "Calling" by Fhána. The second season aired from January 8, 2017, to April 29, 2017. The opening theme is "Illuminate" by Minami Kuribayashi while the ending theme is "Innosense" by Flow.

== Series overview ==
| Season | Episodes | Originally released | |
| Season | Episodes | First released | Last released |
|---|---|---|---|
| 1 | 13 | July 3, 2016 | September 25, 2016 |
| 2 | 13 | January 8, 2017 | April 29, 2017 |

== Episode list ==
=== Season 1 (2016) ===
| No. overall | No. in season | Official English title (Note: All English titles are taken from Funimation.) Original Japanese title | Original release date |
|---|---|---|---|
| 1 | 0 | "Age of Chaos"; Transliteration: "Saiyaku no Jidai" (Japanese: 災厄の時代) | July 3, 2016 |
For the past few years in the Kingdom of Hyland situated in the northeast region of the Glenwood continent, unusual weather has increasingly damaged crops, and even affected the health of the people. Alisha, a royal princess, hears of an ominous mist that has been discovered in Guriel and sends Clem to investigate. When there is no word from Clem, Alisha begins to worry and sets out for Guriel with her attendants. They find the town still shrouded by the eerie mist...
| 2 | 1 | "Capital of Seraphim"; Transliteration: "Ten no Miyako" (Japanese: 天の都) | July 10, 2016 |
One by one, the people she met at Guriel and her attendants are swallowed up by the tornado, leaving Alisha all by herself. As she wanders, she comes upon an ancient ruin and finds a mural depicting the "Shepherd," who will save the world from calamity. But she is attacked by a huge swarm of insects. Alisha barely gets away alive and as though guided by the crest of the Shepherd, arrives in the celestial capital. Just around that time, Sorey, a human youth who resides in Elysium, Home of the Seraphim, and Mikleo, a young Seraph, have also come to the ruins.
| 3 | 2 | "Elysia"; Transliteration: "Izuchi" (Japanese: イズチ) | July 17, 2016 |
Sorey decides to take Alisha, the young girl he meets in the ruins, to Izuchi. Mikleo doesn't care for the idea of taking a human, but Sorey just cannot ignore someone in need. When they reach Izuchi, Alisha passionately calls out to the seraphim to help her. But her pleas seem to go unheard. It is because the seraphim believe that humans will bring calamity to their land. Although she had believed in the seraphim, a forlorn Alisha concludes that the Celestial Record was a legend and nothing more.
| 4 | 3 | "The Sacred Blade Festival"; Transliteration: "Seiken-sai" (Japanese: 聖剣祭) | July 24, 2016 |
After Alisha leaves, Sorey fears that the mysterious man that appeared in Elysium is after her. So Sorey, accompanied by Mikleo, head for Ladylake, the water capital where the Sacred Blade Festival that Alisha mentioned is being held. Upon arriving in the capital, and seeing the human world for the first time, Sorey cannot hide his amazement at the people and scenery. Thanks to a young girl named Rose who comes to his rescue, he is able to enter the city. But the capital is teeming with Malevolence which causes Mikeo to grow physically weak. During that time, Sorey sees the man who was after Alisha.
| 5 | 4 | "The Shepherd's Destiny"; Transliteration: "Dōshi no Sadame" (Japanese: 導師のさだめ) | July 31, 2016 |
In order to save the people from the hellion that appears in Ladylake, Sorey extracts the Sacred Blade of the Lady of the Lake which would make him a Shepherd. He brings down the hellion, but Sorey himself collapses and regains consciousness later. Donning the legendary Shepherd's attire given to him by Alisha, Sorey goes into town. The streets are lined with banners bearing the Shepherd's crest and he realizes how much hope the people place on the Shepherd. Later, Sorey becomes the vessel of the Lady of the Lake and gains the ability to perceive Malevolence. And sensing Malevolence, he searches for its source in the aqueduct.
| 6 | 5 | "Dawn of Chaos"; Transliteration: "Saiyaku no Hajimari" (Japanese: 災厄のはじまり) | August 7, 2016 |
Velvet – a woman who is in prison. Devouring monsters called "daemons," she has lived in confinement for several years. Velvet has only one purpose in life. To get revenge against the man who leads the Abbey, an organization of exorcists who possess the power to battle daemons. To bring down the man they call their savior, Artorius Collbrande. One day, Artorius' former partner, a Malak known as Seres, appears before Velvet to try to help her escape. This episode also features the clean version of the opening movie of Tales of Zestiria, featuring the game's theme song, "White Light" by Superfly, which is also replaced with the instrumental version in the English version, due to licensing issues.
| 7 | 6 | "Velvet Crowe"; Transliteration: "Berubetto Kurau" (Japanese: ベルベット・クラウ) | August 14, 2016 |
Velvet escapes from the prison tower with the help of a young daemon named Rokurou. The only way to access the island prison is by ship, so she and Seres head for the harbor. But Oscar, the praetor exorcist who has been ordered by Artorius to subdue Velvet, is already there. Velvet takes him on. Oscar believes in the natural law of the world that Artorius espouses. But Velvet cannot forgive such a world that was made possible by the sacrifice of her younger brother, Laphicet. Completely at odds with each other, the fighting continues... when suddenly, a dragon appears. This episode also revealed the opening movie of Tales of Berseria, featuring the game's theme song, "Burn" by Flow, four days before the game's release in Japan.
| 8 | 7 | "Each One's Feelings"; Transliteration: "Sorezore no Omoi" (Japanese: それぞれの想い) | August 21, 2016 |
Sorey listens to Lailah explain about the Shepherd's true mission when a dragon appears. It goes away without attacking Sorey, but the townspeople who see this are overcome with gratitude, and even Barltow himself invites Sorey to his mansion. On the way there, Sorey see miasma from the Malevolence rising up among the people. He resolves to pursue the dragon in order to stop the Malevolence before it can spread in Ladylake. Meanwhile, Mikleo begins to ponder what he must do to inspire Sorey who is now a Shepherd.
| 9 | 8 | "Rayfalke Spiritcrest"; Transliteration: "Reihō Reiforuku" (Japanese: 霊峰レイフォルク) | August 28, 2016 |
Mikleo goes to the Galahad Ruins in search of the legendary Divine Artifact that can suppress evil spirits. Meanwhile, after parting ways with Alisha who is headed for Marlind, Sorey goes to Rayfalke Spiritcrest which appears in dragon folklore. There, he encounters a young seraph named Edna being attacked by a hellion. Sorey and Lailah confront the hellion, but the Malevolence is too strong and they cannot deliver a decisive blow. Suddenly, another seraph named Zaveid appears and makes quick work of the hellion, declaring that killing hellions is his style. When Sorey objects, the seraph cryptically counters with "Maybe some are saved by killing them."
| 10 | 9 | "The Plagued City"; Transliteration: "Ekibyō no Machi" (Japanese: 疫病の街) | September 4, 2016 |
Alisha's party and the medical unit find the bridge leading to Marlind collapsed due to the heavy rains, and start searching for a detour. Meanwhile, Sorey continues his journey and reveals to Edna the seraph that he is going to Rolance, which is rumored to have many ancient ruins where dragons were deified as gods. Sorey's earnest faith in the writings in the Celestial Records exasperates Edna, but she opts to tag along. Later, Lailah asks Sorey, "What does 'purify' mean to you?" This causes Sorey to reflect on how he must confront future hellions. About that time, Mikleo, armed with a Divine Artifact, heads for Griftlet Bridge where a maelstrom of clouds swirls overhead.
| 11 | 10 | "Alisha Diphda"; Transliteration: "Arīsha Difuda" (Japanese: アリーシャ・ディフダ) | September 11, 2016 |
Sorey pursues the elusive Drake to Marlind and reunites with Mikleo who has acquired a Divine Artifact in the form of a bow. Entering into a Sub Lord pact, they armatize and successfully purify the Drake with an arrow. Later, they go to help with the reconstruction and set about purifying the town's water. Sorey accompanies Alisha to disperse emergency supplies that have arrived from Ladylake and encounters Rose, the Sparrowfeathers merchant who helped him when he first arrived in Ladylake. Her group has also brought supplies from Ladylake.
| 12 | 11 | "The War"; Transliteration: "Sensō" (Japanese: 戦争) | September 18, 2016 |
Sorey and the others leave Rohan the seraph and Atakk the Normin seraph to watch over Marlind, and head for Glaivend Basin at the border of Hyland and Rolance, where Bartlow is attempting to incite a war. Sorey warns Alisha that if war has begun, he will side with neither Hyland nor Rolance. But as a Shepherd, he wants to stop the fighting. Sorey and company reach Glaivend, only to find a battlefield teeming with Malevolence. Alisha sets out to convince Hyland's General Landon to stop the fighting, but Sorey tells her "I am going to do what I can."
| 13 | 12 | "The Lord of Calamity"; Transliteration: "Saika no Kenshu" (Japanese: 災禍の顕主) | September 25, 2016 |
War inevitably breaks out between the Kingdom of Hyland and the Rolance Empire. Just at Bartlow had planned, Alisha is stabbed by a soldier from her own kingdom. Meanwhile, an immense mass of Malevolence appears before Sorey and company on the main battlefield. It is none other than Heldalf, the Lord of Calamity. Sorey sees the real Heldalf in the center of the Malevolence and declares that he will "purify" him. Even as countless hellions summoned by Heldalf charge at him, Sorey has faith in his power and the power of his friends, and continues to fight.

=== Season 2 (2017) ===
| No. overall | No. in season | Official English title Original Japanese title | Original release date |
|---|---|---|---|
| 14 | 1 | "World without Malevolence"; Transliteration: "Kegarenaki Sekai" (Japanese: 穢れなき世界) | January 8, 2017 |
Accompanied by Rose and the Sparrowfeathers, Sorey and friends head for a new land, Rolance. On the way, some rogues try to sell Rose stolen herbs. When she sees through them, they threaten her, but Rose thrashes them easily. Sorey is impressed with her sharp business acumen. At night, he continues to train with Lailah, learning to recognize and stop the Malevolence; honing his skills to confront the powerful mass of Malevolence known as "The Lord of Calamity." The party arrives in the commercial city of Lastonbell and meet Mayvin the storyteller.
| 15 | 2 | "Wind Seraph, Dezel"; Transliteration: "Kaze no Ten-zoku Dezeru" (Japanese: 風の天族デゼル) | January 15, 2017 |
In Lastonbell, the assassination guild known as the "Scattered Bones" led by Rose kills the bishop who has been fattening his pockets and silencing any who might talk. Despite feeling uncomfortable about Rose's attitude, Sorey joins her for breakfast. Sergei, the general of the Rolance imperial guards, the Platinum Knights, appears. The previous night, he had come looking for Sorey, only to end up getting intoxicated, and has come to apologize for his unbecoming behavior. Just then, an explosion occurs near the city's sanctuary, causing the ground to collapse. Sorey and company rush to check. After confirming that the Malevolence caused the collapse, they enter the sanctuary to perform a purification.
| 16 | 3 | "Each One's Principles"; Transliteration: "Sorezore no Tetsugaku" (Japanese: それぞれの哲学) | January 22, 2017 |
Rose is enraged upon learning that her trading partner Guren was captured by the Bishop's men and is no longer alive. To ease her anger, Dezel the Seraph sets out to destroy the church sanctuary in Lastonbell. While Lailah and the others go to stop him, Sorey goes to join Rose. Although she cannot see Dezel, she becomes aware that Dezel is causing the phenomenon occurring near the sanctuary and urges him to stop. Sorey asks Dezel, "Why did you try to destroy the sanctuary?" And Dezel recounts his past, and how he first met Rose.
| 17 | 4 | "Revenge"; Transliteration: "Fukushū" (Japanese: 復讐) | January 29, 2017 |
Long ago, her comrades in the Windriders and her foster parent Brad had been driven to death by the imperial prince, Konan. Rose receives news of Prince Konan's whereabouts and begins preparing for a journey of revenge. Sorey is told of the unceasing rain by Sergei and decides to go to Pendrago, the capital of Rolance, to investigate the cause. Worried about Dezel, Sorey asks Rose to join him on the journey, but is flatly turned down. As he heads out to Pendrago, he asks Mikleo to follow Rose, and Dezel who is with her. Mikleo agrees, and he and Edna set out to check on how Rose's journey is going.
| 18 | 5 | "Justice at Hand rather than Ideal beyond One's Reach"; Transliteration: "Todokanai Risō yori Me no Mae no Seigi" (Japanese: 届かない理想より目の前の正義) | February 5, 2017 |
Rose finally finds Prince Konan, the target of her revenge, but he has already turned into a hellion. Her attacks against him are useless and he counters with a power that is beyond human. When Dezel comes to her assistance, the tower inside which they are fighting suddenly collapses. Sorey rescues them, but Rose is distraught that Konan is nowhere to be seen and that she did not "finish him completely." Sorey tells Rose he disapproves of her being an assassin, to which she replies, "There are guys in this world who must be killed." And Sorey goes on to explain about "Malevolence."
| 19 | 6 | "Negotiation"; Transliteration: "Shōdan" (Japanese: 商談) | February 12, 2017 |
Escorted by the Platinum Knights, Sorey and friends arrive at the residence of Doran, ruler of the Rolance Empire. Doran recounts to Sorey the legend passed down through the imperial family, about the Malevolence in the world and the "beginning of calamities." Furthermore, he gives Sorey the disturbing news that Alisha of Hyland seems to have been put house arrest. Sorey is shocked but decides that the Malevolence must be stopped as soon as possible and heads for Pendrago. Meanwhile, Rose who has learned from Sorey that the Malevolence is the cause of the disasters in the world, asks Dezel of a way to see this Malevolence. Then she goes to Sorey with a certain proposal for negotiation.
| 20 | 7 | "Ladylake"; Transliteration: "Redireiku" (Japanese: レディレイク) | February 19, 2017 |
With Rose who enters into a Squire's contract with him, Sorey goes to Pendrago and purifies the dead dragon which has continued to fester Malevolence. Then, Alisha's voice reaches him from Ladylake, calling for his help to deal with the tornadoes that have appeared. She loses connection with him but Alisha heads for Sitole which is in the path of the tornado, intent on rescuing the people. Alisha and her knights arrive safely, but even here, a hellion attacks. Just as she is about to be swallowed up by this mud-like hellion, the seraph Zaveid arrives.
| 21 | 8 | "Purification"; Transliteration: "Jōka" (Japanese: 浄化) | February 26, 2017 |
Upon learning that Maltran her teacher has been imprisoned by Bartlow, and is being crucified, Alisha and her subordinates sneak into Ladylake. Swearing that "no one must die," she sprints through the city undauntedly even though Bartlow's men obstruct her path. Meanwhile, Sorey and company pursue the dragon, which is headed towards Ladylake, but the dragon picks up speed, making it impossible for Sorey to catch up. About that time, Lunarre comes to taunt Maltran, who smiles and retorts, "Alisha will not come here."
| 22 | 9 | "The Ideal World"; Transliteration: "Itsuka Yumemita Sekai" (Japanese: いつか夢見た世界) | March 5, 2017 |
With the help of his friends, Sorey purifies the dragon that resides inside the tornado headed for Ladylake. Alisha and Rose had absorbed some of the Malevolence from Sorey. This takes its toll and causes them to fall into a deep slumber, but they awaken with no ill effects. They resolve to continue to help Sorey as his squires. Meanwhile, Dezel battles Symonne who declares that her master, the Lord of Calamity, can no longer be stopped, and that the world will end. Symonne shows Sorey an illusion of the Lord of Calamity and despite feeling the impact of his overwhelming power, he decides to head for the northern land to find the Lord of Calamity.
| 23 | 10 | "Northern Land"; Transliteration: "Kita no Daichi" (Japanese: 北の大地) | March 12, 2017 |
Sorey and company head for the north to find the Lord of Calamity. Alisha and Rose resolve to support Sorey as his squires and continue to practice armatization with Edna and Dezel. Meanwhile, Sorey reads the second Celestial Record given to him by Lailah and finds entries about the north. In the northern land is the wellspring of a power of creation, and earthpulses connect the world to it. However, this land in the extreme north is not effective in spreading Malevolence. Sorey begins to ponder why the Lord of Calamity would go there. Then, Malevolence overflowing from the north attack Sorey and the others.
| 24 | 11 | "Be like the Wind"; Transliteration: "Kaze ni Naru" (Japanese: 風になる) | March 19, 2017 |
Despite being thwarted by numerous dragons and the Malevolence, Sorey and company forge ahead and catch up to the Lord of Calamity. But after declaring that he is going to the center of the world, the Lord of Calamity disappears. Sorey and the others pursue him far to the north to the town of Meirchio where they encounter Grimoire of the Normin Clan. In town, Sorey ponders about the origin of the Malevolence, as well as the seraphim and the Lord of Calamity. After their short respite, Sorey along with Alisha, Rose and the five seraphim bid farewell to their friends who had traveled with them, and they set out to their final battle.
| 25 | 12 | "The Chosen Answer"; Transliteration: "Michibiki Dashita Kotae" (Japanese: 導き出した答え) | March 26, 2017 |
While in pursuit of the Lord of Calamity, Sorey and company are hindered by a huge army of dragons, but Dezel gives his life to thrash the dragons and open up a path. Sorey moves forward, determined that Dezel's sacrifice will not have been in vain. Seeing an enormous amount of Malevolence flowing out of a cave, Sorey confirms the presence of the Lord of Calamity. Meanwhile, deep down in the large cavern, the Lord of Calamity has a confrontation with Maotelus, one of the Five Lords.
| 26 | 13 | "The Legend"; Transliteration: "Denshō" (Japanese: 伝承) | April 29, 2017 |
Sorey Armatizes with Zaveid, Edna, Mikleo, and Lailah, using all of their powers in an ultimate Armatization form in a final battle against Heldalf, who had become a monstrous beast. In a hard battle, Sorey is able to defeat Heldalf, releasing him from the monstrous form, but he still remains the Lord of Calamity. The Malevolence uses the beaten Heldalf as a hollow vessel to use. Sorey promises to free him from this fate and attacks again, plunging the two of them into underground river. He sends the Seraphim away so he can fight him on his own. This sacrifice seems to have worked as the Malevolence has stopped and lowered to near non-existent levels around the world. Maotelus proclaims that this is the first time to truly purifying the world. Their battle done; everyone goes their separate ways. In the years that followed, Alisha becomes Queen of Hyland and brokers a peace treaty with Rolance. Lailah is revered by the people of Ladylake and the surrounding countryside, leaving on another adventure with a new Sheapard. Edna has become a Lord of the Land, with Zaveid serving as her bodyguard, and Eizen, who had regained some semblance of humanity with the lowered Malevolence. Rose and Alisha remain close friends. Mikleo is still exploring the world but receives a telepathic contact from Sorey. Mikleo finds Sorey alive and well, revealing that he was able to Purify Heldalf and left him in a far-off country town that was unaffected by his rampage. He and Mikleo decide to head home, hitting up whatever ruins they can find along the way.
