= Glma =

Glma may refer to:

- GLMA: Health Professionals Advancing LGBTQ Equality
- Great Lakes Mink Association, now part of American Legend Cooperative, marketers of Blackglama
- Exo-1,4-beta-D-glucosaminidase, an enzyme
