= Conclusion (book) =

Ending section of a book

In a non-fiction book, a conclusion is an ending section which states the concluding ideas and concepts of the preceding writing. This generally follows the body or perhaps an afterword, and the conclusion may be followed by an epilogue, outro, postscript, appendix/addendum, glossary, bibliography, index, errata, or a colophon. Aristotle, in The Rhetoric, tells us a good writer should do this in the conclusion: "make the audience well-disposed towards ourselves and ill-disposed to our opponent."

== See also ==
- Addendum
- Postface
- Publishing
