= American Legend =

American Legend or An American Legend may refer to:

- American Legend Cooperative, an agricultural marketing cooperative of mink fur farmers in the United States and Canada
- American Legend AL11, an American light-sport aircraft
- John Henry, an American Legend, a 1965 children's picture book
- Geronimo: An American Legend, a 1993 historical Western film
- Seabiscuit: An American Legend, a 1999 non-fiction book written by Laura Hillenbrand
- Disney's American Legends, a 2002 American animated anthology film
- El Muerto (2007 film), also known as The Dead One: An American Legend, a 2007 American independent superhero film

== See also ==
- American (disambiguation)
- Legend (disambiguation)
