= Martin de Knijff =

Swedish sports bettor and poker player (born 1972)

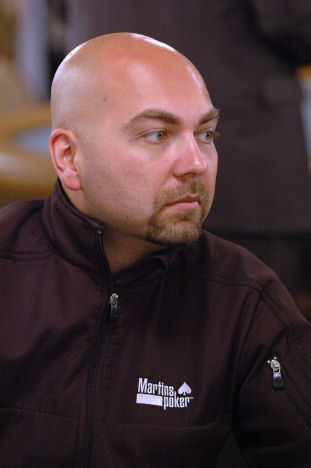
- de Knijff in 2006 World Series of Poker
- Nickname: The Knife
- Born: 2 October 1972 (age 54); Sweden
Betting information
- Type: Sports betting Horse betting Poker betting
- Stake: High-stakes/Nosebleed stakes
- Status: Professional (poker); World renowned (horse); Millionaire (sports)
World Series of Poker
- Bracelet: None
- Money finishes: 3
- Highest WSOP Main Event finish: 13th, 2002
World Poker Tour
- Title: 1
- Final table: 1
- Money finishes: 6
European Poker Tour
- Title: None
- Final table: None
- Money finish: 1

Martin de Knijff (born 2 October 1972) is a professional sports bettor and live tournament high-stakes poker player from Gothenburg, Sweden.

His last name is from his Dutch father. His mother is Swedish. The family moved to Falkenberg when Martin was 5 and in 1992 Martin left to go to Stockholm and from there to Las Vegas where he currently lives.

Martin started playing poker aged 15 (mostly 5-card draw) but became fond of Omaha and Hold-Em when introduced to them. He considers Doyle Brunson's book Super/System to be the best poker book ever written.

He first made a name for himself in the poker world with a 13th-place finish in the 2002 World Series of Poker Main Event, earning himself $60,000.

In the World Poker Tour, he finished 15th in the series 1 championship, winning $26,664; and went on to win the same tournament the following year, earning a then-record-breaking $2,728,356.

Less than a month later his success continued with a 2nd-place finish in the $5,000 No Limit Hold-Em event at the 2004 World Series of Poker.

Martin wrote an article for Card Player magazine in 2005 encouraging tournament backers to reveal themselves. It was met with mixed reactions from poker professionals.

As of his last tournament cash in 2008, his total live tournament winnings exceed $3,370,000.

In addition to poker, Martin is an avid bridge player. He finished second in the 2008 Blue Ribbon Pairs, one of the two major North American pairs bridge championships.
