= Before Lawrence v. Texas =

2023 non-fiction book by Wesley G. Phelps

- Cover for Before Lawrence v. Texas
- Author: Wesley G. Phelps
- Subject: History of LGBT legal cases in Texas
- Publisher: University of Texas Press
- Publication date: February 7, 2023
- Pages: 344
- Awards: 2024 Coral Horton Tullis Memorial Prize; 2024 Kempner Family Book Prize Honorable Mention
- ISBN: 9781477326664

Before Lawrence v. Texas: The Making of a Queer Social Movement is a 2023 non-fiction book by Wesley G. Phelps that discusses the history of anti-sodomy laws in the United States and how queer activism and legal action led to the 2003 Lawrence v. Texas decision. Published by the University of Texas Press, the idea for the book came after Phelps began researching the Lawrence case for a panel discussion and found how Baker v. Wade and other legal conflicts created more depth in the history that led to the 2003 case.

The book covers five chapters, with one or several legal cases being the focus of each, including Buchanan v. Batchelor, Baker v. Wade, Morales v. Texas, and England v. City of Dallas, and how the fight against Texas' Homosexual Conduct Law lasted multiple decades. This serves to show how LGBT groups tried to combat anti-sodomy laws throughout the 20th century, with many legal victories being waylaid by the United States Supreme Court refusing to contradict Texas legal code.

Positively reviewed by academic journals and news media, Phelps' dive into Texas LGBT history has been noted for its level of historiography that has extensively contributed to greater understanding of how legal cases impacted each other over time. The timely release of the book with ongoing legal issues facing the LGBT community in the 2020s was also appreciated by multiple reviewers, though some wished the final conclusion of the book had spent more time outlining that important facet of the narrative.

== Background ==
While Phelps was a professor at Sam Houston State University, his colleague Thomas Cox created several panel discussions about the Constitution and asked Phelps if he would like to hold one on Lawrence v. Texas. The research done for hosting the discussion led Phelps to find the subject had more depth than he expected and resulted in him writing a book to better explain the history that led to the judicial decision. The first connected case he found when beginning his investigation was that of Donald Baker and Baker v. Wade, which led Phelps to have a picture of Baker be on the cover of the book. The book was published in February 2023 by the University of Texas Press.

== Content ==
The book includes an introduction, five chapters, and a conclusion section. The first page features a quote from Baker, which states "You have to look at the long-term, not the short-term in this case". The introduction discusses the judicial arguments behind the Lawrence v. Texas ruling and its effect on sodomy laws at the state level. Later ramifications and developments from the decision are explained, including the overturing of the Defense of Marriage Act and the Supreme Court rulings in United States v. Windsor and Obergefell v. Hodges. Phelps then looked back to earlier historical events in the 19th century that includes the original passing of sodomy penal laws in the 1860s and the conflict between Fennell v. State (1869) and Frazier v. State (1873) that led to an overturning of the law due to its vague language. Revisions to the laws, particularly in Texas, over the following decades saw a re-enforcement alongside rulings in Texas courts to support the changes as constitutional. Further challenges and evolutions to the law are explained up through Sinclair v. State (1958), which had the definition of sodomy enlarged to include non-penetrative sex.

The first chapter covers the years from 1965 through 1974 and the 1970 case of Buchanan v. Batchelor that challenged sodomy laws on the right to privacy and a violation of the previous decision in Griswold v. Connecticut. The judge agreed and overturned Texas' Article 524, which led the Texas legislature to pass a new article in 1973 that converted the sentencing of multiple years in jail to only a misdemeanor for violating sodomy. This was called Article 21.06 and became colloquially known as the Texas Homosexual Conduct Law. At the same time, however, the Texas government, police, and other state agencies began prosecuting the LGBT community for any form of aforementioned "homosexual conduct" that was now deemed to be a violation of this new form of the sodomy statute, including restricting basic rights such as child custody and job employment under claims that being homosexual was an inherently criminal act.

Chapters two and three cover how Article 21.06 was expanded up through 1982 and the efforts made to legally fight back against its impact on sexual minorities, with a focus on the story of Gene Leggett and his fight to receive welfare benefits. The fourth chapter concerns Baker v. Wade and the case of Donald Baker who agreed to work with the Texas Gay Alliance and the Texas Human Rights Foundation to file a challenge against the homosexual conduct law. As a Pentecostal Christian, a military veteran, and a teacher, he was seen as the best chance for overturning the conduct law. While he won his case at the district level, the result was later stayed by the Fifth Circuit and the Supreme Court ultimately heard the case of Bowers v. Hardwick instead and upheld Texas' sodomy law.

The final chapter follows the subsequent decades and other outcomes in cases including Morales v. Texas (1992) and England v. City of Dallas (1993). The former had a district court again invalidate Article 21.06 as a violation of privacy law. However, the Texas Supreme Court muddled the decision on appeal by ruling that a civil court judge could not rule on the constitutionality of criminal law, but did not themselves rule on the constitutionality of the law in question. The latter case involved a lesbian who was actively discriminated against by police recruiters after they were informed of her sexuality. Once more, the case was won on the district level and dismissed at the appeals court level. Though the appeals judges did uphold that the law was unconstitutional, allowing the Dallas city council to revoke the Dallas Police Department's ban on employing gay individuals. The conclusion section re-examines Lawrence v. Texas in light of all the caselaw that came before it and how the arguments used by the litigators in the case reflected much of the same prior statements in earlier cases. Phelps also warns that evolving case law means that even this victory may not be permanent and future litigation should be carefully watched and considered.

== Critical reception ==
For the journal Texas Books In Review, John Mckiernan-González stated that the book belongs alongside other "iconic monographs" of Texas politics and history, with the work being exemplified by the written records and personal narratives of those involved in the court cases and other events that Phelps helped gather for the publication. While having some criticisms for the organization of chapters about the Texas Homosexual Conduct Law, Pacific Historical Review review writer Jay Watkins nonetheless considered the book an "excellent contribution to the historiography and should be read by those interested in modern LGBTQ and legal history." Kirkus Reviews noted that the book's coverage of prior LGBT legal history in Texas successfully creates a "vivid narrative that shows how Lawrence didn't spring out of the blue" and that the book's release is very timely for current challenges facing the LGBT community.

Leisa D. Meyer in the Journal of Southern History praised the book's discussion of individuals and events in a manner that "persuasively and compellingly demonstrates how citizens at the local level became the critical vector and source for the successful litigation of Lawrence and Garner", but also criticized Phelps' lack of attention to how the queer activist groups were composed and how this personal makeup affected their actions. She points out that the "greatest weakness" of the book is how it largely avoids addressing factors beyond sexuality that majorly impacted applications of Texas' anti-LGBT laws, including how specific sexualities were "racialized and gendered and classed" by conservatives in their rhetoric. Complimenting the "exhaustively researched legal and political analysis" the book represents, the Southwestern Historical Quarterly's La Shonda Mims acknowledges the worth that such an investigation gives to modern history and what it offers to "future researchers who should build on the issues of race and the queer past in Texas".

Publishers Weekly called the book "scholarly yet accessible" for its ability to explain the events leading up to Lawrence v. Texas that shows the growing activist action throughout the decades. The Historian's Sofia Paschero considered Before Lawrence v. Texas a "significant historical contribution to United States queer history" with its ability to break down multiple legal cases in an understandable and compelling manner, though wished the Conclusion section had been its own full chapter with more detail on ongoing importance of the case.

== Awards ==
The 2024 Coral Horton Tullis Memorial Prize was awarded to Before Lawrence v. Texas by the Texas State Historical Association in the category of "Best Book on Texas History". For an honorable mention award, the Philosophical Society of Texas included the book in their 2024 Kempner Family Book Prize in the nonfiction category.
