= Postscript =

Content appended to completed document

A postscript (P.S., PS., or PS) may be a sentence, a paragraph, or occasionally many paragraphs added, often hastily and incidentally, after the signature of a letter or (sometimes) the main body of an essay or book. For such longer works it may also be known as an afterword or subscription. The term comes from the Latin "post scriptum", an expression meaning "written after" (which may be interpreted in the sense of "that which comes after the writing").

== Afterword ==
In a book or essay, a more carefully composed addition (e.g., for a second edition) is called an afterword. It is a literary device that is often found at the end of a piece of literature. It generally covers the story of how the book came into being, or of how the idea for the book was developed.

An afterword may be written by someone other than the author of the book to provide enriching comment, such as discussing the work's historical or cultural context (especially if the work is being reissued many years after its original publication).

== Addendum ==
The word "postscript" has poetically been used to refer to any sort of addendum to some main work even if it is not attached to a main work, for example Søren Kierkegaard's book titled Concluding Unscientific Postscript. Such a section may also be called a "subscription", for example a subscription is found at the end of St Paul's Second Letter to the Corinthians in some manuscripts, stating that it was written by Paul when he was at Philippi, a city of Macedonia, and transcribed by Titus and Lucas.

== Cascading postscripts ==
Sometimes when additional points are made after the first postscript, abbreviations such as P.P.S. (post-post-scriptum) and P.P.P.S. (post-post-post-scriptum) and so on are added, ad infinitum.

== See also ==
- Addendum
- Appendix
- Conclusion
- Epilogue
- Foreword
- Nota bene
- Postface
- Preface
