= Epilogue =

Literary device

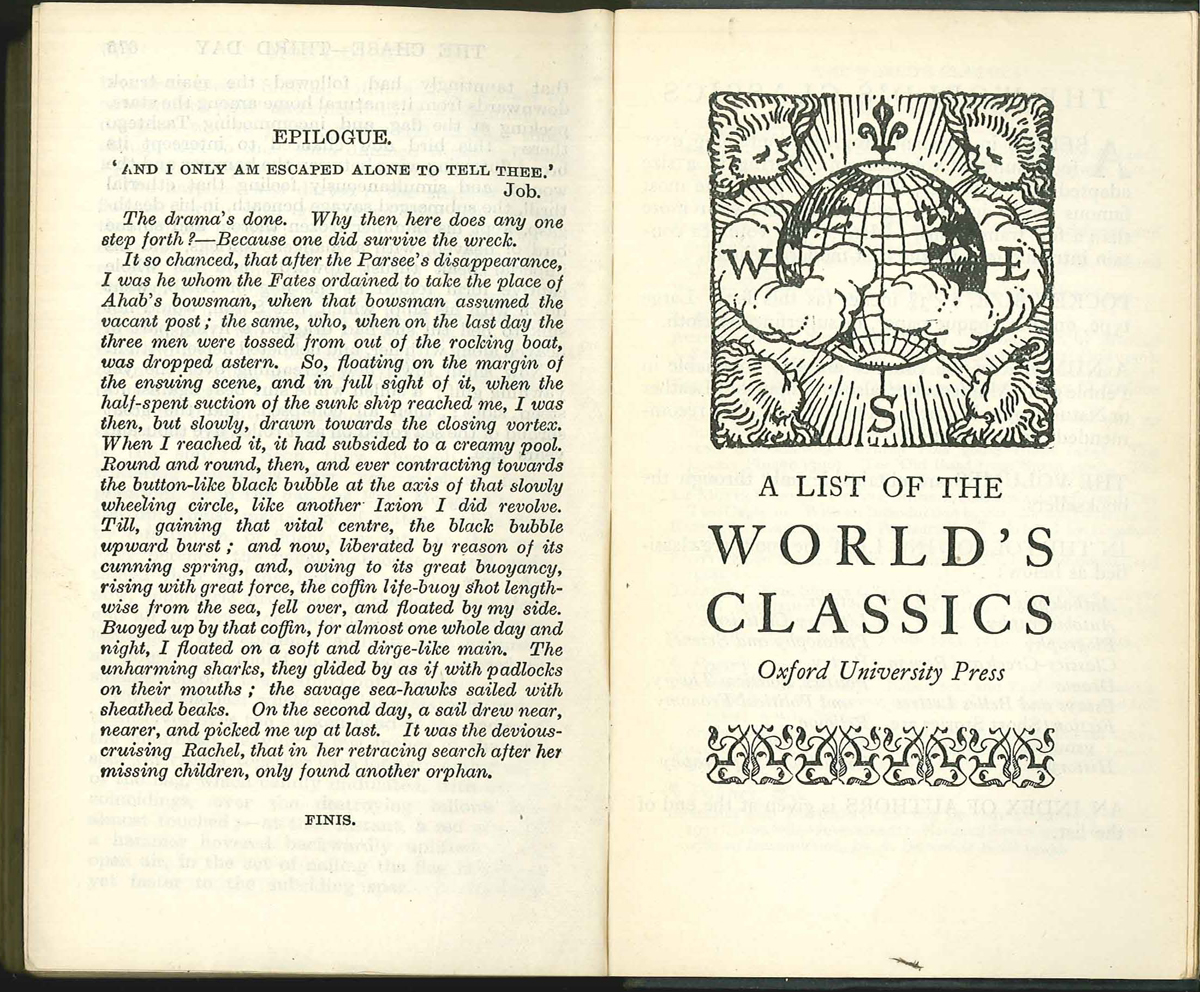
Photo of Epilogue from Moby Dick or, The Whale, by Herman Melville

An epilogue or epilog (from Greek ἐπίλογος epílogo, "conclusion" from ἐπί epi, "in addition" and λόγος logos, "word") is a piece of writing at the end of a work of literature, usually used to bring closure to the work. It is presented from the perspective of within the story. When the author steps in and speaks directly to the reader, that is more properly considered an afterword. The opposite is a prologue—a piece of writing at the beginning of a work of literature or drama, usually used to open the story and capture interest. Some genres, for example television programs and video games, call the epilogue an "outro" patterned on the use of "intro" for "introduction".

Epilogues are usually set in the future, after the main story is completed. Within some genres it can be used to hint at the next installment in a series of work. It is also used to satisfy the reader's curiosity and to cover any loose ends of the story.

== History of the term ==
The first known use of the word epilogue was in the 15th century and it was used as a concluding section for literary work.

In Middle English and Middle French the term "epilogue" was used. In Latin they used epilogus, from Greek epilogos, and then epilegein.

The first citation of the word epilogue in the Oxford English Dictionary is from 1564: "Now at length you are come to the Epilogue (as it were) or full conclusion of your worke." Prior to this the OED only refers to Caxton's term ‘Epylogacion’ in 1474, ‘The Epylogacion and recapitulation of this book’. However, this term was not widely followed and instead ‘conclusion’ was the term used to introduce final words of a text. The first example of a dramatic epilogue in print is John Phillip's The Play of Patient and Meek Grissell (1569). Although in non-dramatic publications, the word does appear prior to this such as in Turbervile's Epitaphs (1566).

The word epilogue could be adopted to describe the end of speeches within medieval plays, but at the time this was primarily used to hint at the connection to later works. Most Greek plays would end with lines from the Chorus, which was different to the epilogues of early modern playwrights as well as Ancient Roman plays.

American Author Henry James has said the epilogue is a place that distributes last "prizes, pensions, husbands, wives, babies, millions, appended paragraphs and cheerful remarks." The word epilogue has also been described as a "Parthian Dart" by Pat Rogers. He said it has the potential to be excessive for some readers as it has a "shift in tense, and a jump in tempo-an accelerando" which quickly changes to a "loosening of the temporal screw, enabling us to move rapidly ahead over a period of years". Epilogues also consisted of a non-traditional "topoi" which was a metaphor introduced by Aristotle, to symbolise writers creating arguments in their story.

== In literature ==
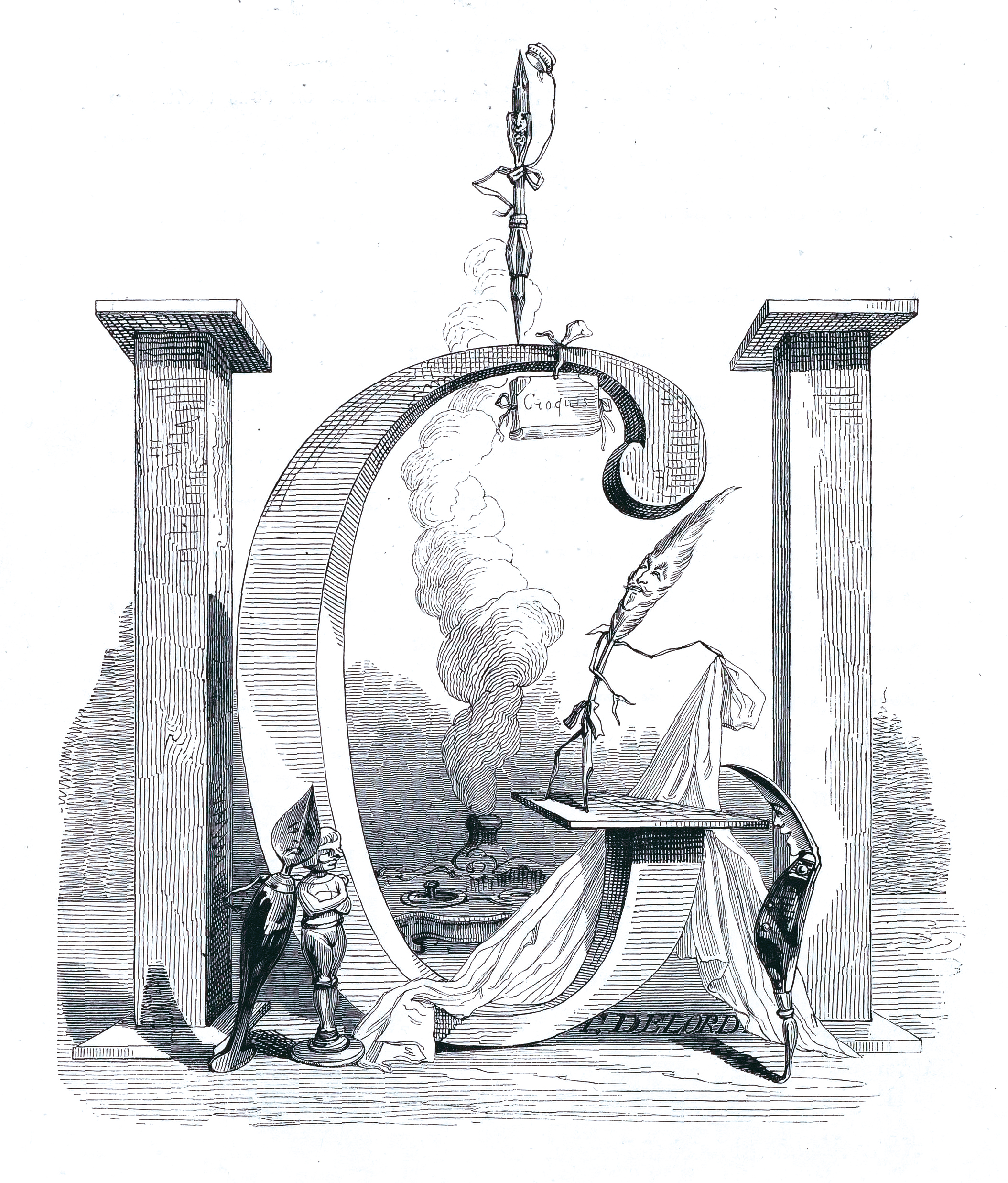
Illustration from Un Autre Monde epilogue, by Grandville

An epilogue is the final chapter at the end of a story that often serves to reveal the fates of the characters. Some epilogues may feature scenes only tangentially related to the subject of the story. They can be used to hint at a sequel or wrap up all the loose ends. They can occur at a significant period of time after the main plot has ended. In some cases, the epilogue is used to allow the main character a chance to "speak freely".

An epilogue can continue in the same narrative style and perspective as the preceding story, although the form of an epilogue can occasionally be drastically different from the overall story. It can also be used as a sequel.

=== Books ===
For example, in Margaret Atwood's The Handmaid's Tale the epilogue is a transcript of a symposium at a university in the Arctic, held in 2195. The majority of the epilogue is a speech given by a professor named Pieixoto who is an expert on the area of Gilead where The Handmaid's Tale takes place. In the epilogue the land of Gilead has long gone and the main character Offred has her story published. The story is her perspective of the past events within the novel and Offred titles her publication the eponym, ‘The Handmaid's Tale.’

In George Orwell's Animal Farm, the epilogue is used to satisfy the curiosity of the readers by revealing a utopic ending to the characters in the Manor Farm many years after the revolution. "YEARS passed. The seasons came and went, the short animal lives fled by. A time came when there was no one who remembered the old days before the Rebellion, except Clover, Benjamin, Moses the raven, and a number of the pigs."

=== Horror and suspense novels ===
The epilogue can be used to reveal an approaching threat for the character. Readers may believe that the villain has been dealt with, but the epilogue will suggest that this is not entirely true, adding to the horror and mystery of the story.

=== Children's fantasy ===
In children's fantasy it has a particular purpose. It can serve as a reassuring ending to calm fears about a possible bad outcome. This is seen in the Harry Potter Saga where the characters have a happy ending as they are much older and with families. This provides comfort for readers who may have anticipated a bad outcome for them. Epilogues also serve as a transitory stage for the novel to change genres into myths and legends.

=== Plays ===
In Greek and Elizabethan plays, an actor would stand at the front of the stage and speak directly to the audience. They would usually show the contentment the characters have after experiencing the tragedies within the play. If the hero has had a tragic ending, the speaker of the epilogue would provide the moral lesson that the audience can learn from after the hero's poor moral choices were made.

==== Elizabethan plays ====
For example, in Shakespeare's epilogue in Romeo and Juliet, the speaker is providing the moral lesson and the consequences for the audience to take away.

"A glooming peace this morning with it brings;

The sun for sorrow will not show his head.

Go hence to have more talk of these sad things,

Some shall be pardoned, and some punished,

For never was a story of more woe

Than this of Juliet and her Romeo."

In As You Like It, the epilogue is said by Rosalind which shows her content.

"… and I charge you, O men, for the love you bear to women—as I perceive by your simpering, none of you hates them—that between you and the women the play may please. If I were a woman, I would kiss as many of you as had beards that pleased me, complexions that liked me, and breaths that I defied not. And I am sure as many as have good beards, or good faces, or sweet breaths will, for my kind offer, when I make curtsy, bid me farewell."

Epilogues were more frequently delivered by actors. As the epilogue would frame the end of the play it would allow the speaker to both simultaneously perform and reflect on the character. In combining both the speaker's persona and character, Felicity Nussbaum called this the "double consciousness". This invites the audience to reflect on each moment and its meaning behind it. Within tragedies the female epilogues were the most popular, and it would often challenge the integrity of the play. For example, Tyrannick Love took the main female character, who had often undergone tragedy, and reconceptualised her to be a comedian in the epilogue. The female character was adorned in the same costumes that she wore in Act 5 and the speaker would combine her two entities, the tragic role within the main play and her humourized public persona, when speaking in the epilogue.

Many writers would contribute their epilogues to other writer's plays. This would often be out of friendship. Other epilogues were designated as "written by a person of quality" or "sent from and unknown hand". From the period between 1660 and 1714 outsiders of England would supply both prologues and epilogues 229 times.

Epilogues would often focus to ensure the audience will return by pointing out the play's worth in the closing lines. There have also been linkages between epilogues and prayers and how they are often synonymous with each other when concluding pieces of literature.

==== Greek plays ====
Most Greek plays would end with lines said by the Chorus. They usually consist of two lines which encapsulate the moral observation of the play. Nine of Euripides’s plays have a deux ex machina and another three "end with a mortal who takes on the superhuman powers of a deus".

==== Roman plays ====
Roman plays have particularly shorter epilogues and mainly consist of pleas for a plaudite. This is seen in Terence’s extant plays and Plautus’s comedies. In Plautus’s plays Trinummus, Poenulus, Persa, Milus Gloriosus and Curculio all end with pleas for applause. This is to involve the audience by asking them to participate in the applause. However, in Epidicus the epilogue further states ‘Give us your applause… and stretch your limbs and rise’ and in Stitchus ‘Give us your applause, and then have a party of your own at home.’ This was a strategy to disengage the audience, by smoothly transitioning them to the outside world to regain their sense of reality.

== In opera ==
Because commenting on past action is inherently undramatic, few operas have epilogues, even those with prologues. Among those explicitly called epilogues are the concluding scenes of Stravinsky's The Rake's Progress and Offenbach's The Tales of Hoffmann. Other operas whose final scenes could be described as epilogues are Mozart's Don Giovanni, Mussorgsky's Boris Godunov, and Delius's Fennimore and Gerda.

== In film ==
In films, the final scenes may feature a montage of images or clips with a short explanation of what happens to the characters. A few examples of such films are 9 to 5, American Graffiti, Changeling, Four Weddings and a Funeral, Harry Potter and the Deathly Hallows – Part 2, National Lampoon's Animal House, Babe: Pig in the City, Happy Feet Two, Remember the Titans and Zack Snyder's Justice League.

The epilogue of La La Land shows a happy ending, an alternative to the actual ending.

In many documentaries and biopics, the epilogue is text-based, explaining what happened to the subjects after the events covered in the film.

== In video games ==
In video games, epilogues can occur at the end of the story, usually after the credits have rolled. An epilogue in a game functions similarly to an epilogue in film and literature, providing closure to the end of a story. However, the way in which a video game epilogue is interacted with can then determine how the story ends in works of fiction that contain multiple endings. For example, there are four possible endings to the 2012 video game Spec Ops: The Line, and three of the endings are chosen by what the player does in the epilogue. Epilogues may also be presented as peripheral downloadable content or expansion packs that supplements the main content or campaign mode of a game.

In video games that allow the permanent death of playable characters, an epilogue can chronicle what happened to the playable characters who survived and depict how their situation has changed after the story has ended. For example, the 2015 video game Until Dawn features characters who survived (if any) recounting their experiences to the police after being rescued. This system can also be expanded; relationships can be built between characters in most games of the Fire Emblem series, allowing for unique outcomes for characters depending on the actions of the player throughout the campaign.

A visual novel can also feature a type of epilogue, which will wrap up all of the scenarios encountered by a player, most often after the game has been fully completed by reaching all of the multiple endings; as is the case with Tsukihime, featuring an epilogue that expands on the endings of all completable routes, as well as providing context for the rest of the game by explaining events in the prologue.

== See also ==
- Conclusion
- Prologue
