= Legende =

Legende or Légende may refer to:

- Légende (Cras), a work for cello and piano by Jean Cras
- Légende (Enescu), a work for solo trumpet and piano by George Enescu
- Légende (Wieniawski), a showpiece by the Polish violin virtuoso Henryk Wieniawski
- Légende Films, a production company
- Legende 1 Ton, a French racing sailboat design
- Legende (opera)

== See also ==
- Legend (disambiguation)
