= Blind Faith (Legend Seven album) =

Studio album by Legend Seven
- Released: 1993
- Genre: Christian rock
- Length: 49:47
- Label: Word Records
- Producer: Bubba Smith

Legend Seven chronology
| Legend (1992) | Blind Faith (1993) |

Blind Faith is the second album of Christian rock band, Legend Seven. It was released in 1993 under the Word Records label. The band charted several hits on Christian radio from this album ("Be Still", No. 1 for 2 weeks, 1994; "First Love", No. 10, 1994; "Call on Me", No. 15, 1994).

== Track listing ==
All songs written by Andy Denton and Michael Jacobs, except where noted.

1. "Refuge" – 5:52
2. "Burning Desire" (Denton, Jacobs, Billy Williams) – 4:58
3. "Blind Faith" – 4:56
4. "Calm (After the Storm)" – 5:43
5. "Call on Me" – 5:40
6. "Shoot Straight Johnny" (Denton, Jacobs, Randy Ray) – 4:51
7. "Hold Out" (Denton, Jacobs, Williams) – 4:10
8. "First Love" (Darrell Brown, Denton, Jacobs, David Batteau) – 4:52
9. "Soul Surrender" (Ray, Dann Huff) – 4:51
10. "Be Still" (Denton, Jacobs, Tommy Greer) – 3:54

== Musicians ==
- Andy Denton – lead vocals
- Michael Jacobs – guitar, background vocals
- Randy Ray – bass, background vocals
- Billy Williams – drums, percussion, background vocals

=== Additional musicians ===
- Tommy Greer – keyboards, synthesizer and percussion programming
- John Catchings – cello solo on "Call On Me"
- Cheryl Rogers – acoustic piano on "First Love"
- Al "Fish" Herring – trumpet and horn
- Jim Spake – tenor sax on "Blind Faith"
- Mark "Queen Bee" Rider – sunglasses guy on "Blind Faith"

== Production ==
- Produced by Bubba Smith

== Recording ==
- Basic tracks engineered by Marc DeSisto at Quad Studios, Nashville, Tennessee
- Andreas Krause – Assistant Engineer
- Andreas Krause, Bubba Smith, Bert Stevens – Overdub Engineers
- Overdubs recorded at Studio 3319 and Quad Studios at Nashville, Tennessee; Classic Recording at Franklin, Tennessee; Crosstown Records at Memphis, Tennessee.
- Mixed by Marc DeSisto at Kiva Recording Studio, Memphis, Tennessee.
- Terri Argot and Gari Harwood – Mix Assistants
- Mastered by Ken Love at Master Mix, Nashville, Tennessee.
