= Postface =

Brief article or explanatory information placed at the end of a book

A postface is the opposite of a preface, a brief article or explanatory information placed at the end of a book. Postfaces are quite often used in books so that the non-pertinent information will appear at the end of the literary work, and not confuse the reader.

A postface is a text added to the end of a book or written as a supplement or conclusion, usually to give a comment, an explanation, or a warning. The postface can be written by the author of a document or by another person. The postface is separated from the main body of the book and is placed in the appendices pages. The postface presents information that is not essential to the entire book, but which is considered relevant.

== See also ==
- Afterword
- Epilogue
