= Utsunomiko =

Japanese light novel series

- Utsunomiko Bunko Volume 1, illustrated by Mutsumi Inomata

宇宙皇子
- Light novel
- Written by: Keisuke Fujikawa
- Illustrated by: Mutsumi Inomata
- Published by: Kadokawa Shoten
- Original run: 1984 – 1998
- Volumes: 52
- Anime film
- Directed by: Kenji Yoshida
- Produced by: Haruki Kadokawa; Junzō Nakajima; Shōji Satō
- Written by: Sukehiro Tomita; Kenji Terada; Junki Takegami
- Music by: Kunihiro Kawano
- Studio: Nippon Animation
- Released: March 11, 1989
- Runtime: 80 minutes
- Anime film

Utsunomiko: Tenjōhen
- Directed by: Tetsuo Imazawa
- Produced by: Akira Takano; Haruki Kadokawa; Kenji Yokoyama; Sachiko Iijima; Tetsuo Oka; Yōichi Kominato
- Written by: Sukehiro Tomita; Junki Takegami
- Music by: Masahiro Kawasaki
- Studio: Toei Animation
- Released: September 22, 1990
- Runtime: 70 minutes
- Original video animation

Utsunomiko: Heaven Chapter
- Directed by: Tetsuo Imazawa
- Written by: Junki Takegami
- Music by: Masahiro Kawasaki
- Studio: Toei Animation
- Released: October 24, 1990 – February 19, 1992
- Runtime: 30 minutes each
- Episodes: 13

UtsunoMiko (宇宙皇子), also written Utsu no Miko, is a Japanese historical fantasy light novel series written by Keisuke Fujikawa (藤川桂介) and illustrated by Mutsumi Inomata, which was later adapted into an anime of the same title. The story is set in the late Asuka Period to the Nara Period, and follows the trials of the title character Utsunomiko (usually shortened to Miko), the offspring of the kami of the north star. There are 52 Utsunomiko novels, the first published in 1984, and the last published in 1998. The Utsunomiko anime film premiered in 1989, followed by a second anime film and a 13-episode OVA starting in 1990.

== Introduction ==
In the chaos of the Jinshin War of 672, a child with a small horn in his forehead was born. The child's mother condemned him as an oni and cast him away. The founder of the Shūgendō tradition, the miracle-worker and mountain hermit En no Gyōja, earthly incarnation of the heavenly Jinben Daibosatsu, raised the child as his disciple and named him Utsunomiko, or 'Divine Child of the Heavens', telling Miko that his horn symbolizes the union of heaven and earth, and that his father is Hoku-Ten, the god of the North Star, whose name is Ama no Minaka Nushi no Kami, the primeval creator deity of the Kojiki.

Miko matured in the wilderness and becoming a Yamabushi, learning his master's syncretism of Daoism, Buddhism and Shintoism, and soon started venturing into villages out of curiosity. He found that the common people of the villages live in poverty and suffering, and began using his spiritual powers to help them. But his anger at the self-serving rulers and their petty power-struggles grew until he came into open conflict with the Imperial Court (but not the Emperors and the Imperial Family itself, as he befriended some of its members, such as Otsu-no-Miko, a prince of Emperor Tenmu, who, historically, was set up and killed by Empress Jitō in order to secure her son's position as Crown Prince), especially Fujiwara no Fuhito, setting Miko down a long path as a champion of the oppressed, and of his perillious spiritual journey.

== Story arcs ==
- Chronicle of Earth (地上編 – Chijō-hen) – 10 volumes
- Chronicle of Heaven (天上編 – Tenjō-hen) – 10 volumes (Miko faces the rulers of the Heavenly plane and seeks his father)
- Uncanny Dream Chronicle (妖夢編 – Yōmu-hen) – 10 volumes
- Chronicle of Purgatory (煉獄編 – Rengoku-hen) – 10 volumes
- Chronicle of Dawn (黎明編 – Reimei-hen) – 8 volumes
- Gaiden Collection (拾異伝 – Shūiden) – 4 volumes
