= Mutsumi Inomata =

Japanese illustrator and animator (1960–2024)

- Born: 猪股 睦弥; December 23, 1960; Kanagawa Prefecture, Japan
- Died: March 10, 2024 (aged 63)
- Occupations: Illustrator, animator
- Employers: Maki Pro (?–1978); Ashi Productions (1978–1982); Kaname Productions (1982–1984)

Mutsumi Inomata (いのまたむつみ, born 猪股 睦弥, Inomata Mutsumi; December 23, 1960 – March 10, 2024) was a Japanese illustrator and animator.

== Biography ==
Mutsumi Inomata was born in Kanagawa Prefecture on December 23, 1960.

An anime fan, Inomata began working for Ashi Productions, working as an animator, key animation director and character designer on several anime television series.

In 1982, she joined some of the younger staff of Ashi Productions who established Kaname Productions, where she worked as an animator, animation director, and character designer on several of its series. In 1983, she also made her debut as a manga artist, with her work GB Bomber being featured in Tokuma Shoten's The Motion Comic. Later, in 1984, she left Kaname Productions and continued her work as a freelance animator.

Inomata is noted for her work as an animator, character designer and animation director on several anime titles, including Windaria, Plawres Sanshirō, Future GPX Cyber Formula, and Brain Powerd.

Inomata was also a prolific novel illustrator, known for her vivid watercolor paintings which often center around young women with wide, jewel-like eyes. Many of her illustrations are collected in her artbooks, which include Voice of the Stars, Dreams of the Moon (星の聲月の夢), Eccelente, SAI, and numerous others. Her representative works as a novel illustrator are for the Utsunomiko (宇宙皇子) series written by Keisuke Fujikawa (藤川圭介) and Weathering Continent (風の大陸) series by author Sei Takegawa (竹河聖). She is also noted for being the main character designer on a number of titles in Bandai Namco Entertainment's Tales of series of video games.

Inomata died on March 10, 2024, at the age of 63.

== Works ==
=== Manga ===
- GB Bomber (Motion Comics)
- Nyan no Ohanashi (Anime Juke Mix) - based on her love for cats.

=== Artbooks ===
- Inomata Mutsumi Lovely Collection
- Inomata Mutsumi Art Collection - Utsunomiko (いのまたむつみ画集 宇宙皇子)
- Voice of the Stars, Dreams of the Moon (星の聲月の夢)
- Utsunomiko 2 (宇宙皇子2)
- Mikan Story (みかんSTORY)
- Dragon Quest
- Eccellente
- SAI (彩)
- Tales
- Un Ballo En Maschera, The Weathering Continent

=== Anime ===
- Kujira no Josefina (animation)
- Zukkoke Knight Don De La Mancha (animation)
- Space Warrior Baldios (animation)
- Gekijōban Uchū Senshi Baldios (key animation)
- Sengoku Majin GoShōgun (animation director, key animation)
- Sasuga no Sarutobi (animation director, key animation)
- Leda: The Fantastic Adventure of Yohko (character designs, animation director (ep.1))
- Windaria (character designs, animation director)
- Acrobunch (character designs, animation director)
- Plawres Sanshiro (character designs, animation director)
- Urusei Yatsura (key animation)
- City Hunter (animation director)
- City Hunter 2 (animation director)
- Utsunomiko (original character design)
- The Weathering Continent (original character design)
- Watt Poe to Bokura no Ohanashi (character design)
- Magical Princess Minky Momo (key animation)
- Future GPX Cyber Formula (original character design)
- Brain Powerd (original character design)
- Mobile Suit Gundam SEED (design coordinator)
- My-HiME (original seifuku (school uniform) design)
- Mobile Suit Gundam SEED Destiny (design coordinator)
- Sacred Seven (original character design)

=== Games ===
- Alpha (Square)
- Dungeon of Windaria (Nintendo DS, Compile Heart; original character design)
- EMIT (PC game)
- Surging Aura
- Yami no Ketsuzoku (Sega Saturn game)
- Tales series (Bandai Namco Entertainment)
  - Tales of Destiny
  - Tales of Eternia
  - Tales of Destiny 2
  - Tales of Rebirth
  - Tales of Breaker
  - Tales of Eternia Online
  - Tales of the Tempest
  - Tales of Innocence
  - Tales of Hearts
  - Tales of Graces
  - Tales of Xillia
  - Tales of Xillia 2
  - Tales of Zestiria
  - Tales of Berseria
  - Tales of Crestoria
- Tekken series (Bandai Namco Entertainment)
  - Tekken 5 (PlayStation 2; Ling Xiaoyu and Jin Kazama's third costume designs)
  - Tekken 6 (PlayStation 3, Xbox 360 PlayStation Portable; Zafina's third costume design)
  - Tekken Tag Tournament 2 (PlayStation 3, Xbox 360, Wii U; Jaycee's second costume design)
- BB Ball

=== Tokusatsu ===
- Dennō Keisatsu Cyber Cop (Luna design)
