= Legends (Five Star album) =

Compilation album by Five Star
- Released: May 12, 2005
- Recorded: 2005
- Genre: Pop
- Length: 180 minutes
- Label: RCA/BMG/Camden
- Producer: Buster Pearson

Five Star chronology
The Greatest Hits (2003)	Legends (2005)	25th Anniversary Album (2008)

Legends is the name of a 2005 triple CD compilation album by British pop group Five Star. It was the group's fourth 'Greatest Hits' collection issued by BMG Camden in 2005 as a general release, to celebrate the band's 20 years since their first hit single. The album was issued on CD only. The 41-track album comprises remastered versions of all 40 tracks from Five Star's first four albums with RCA/BMG (replacing the full version of "Strong as Steel" with the single edit) with the addition of the 1989 Greatest Hits single "With Every Heartbeat", but omitting the only remaining released song from their RCA/BMG catalogue, 1989's "Something about my baby".

== Track listing ==
=== Disc 1 ===
1. System Addict
2. Rain or Shine
3. The Slightest Touch
4. If I Say Yes
5. All Fall Down
6. Let Me Be the One
7. Can't Wait Another Minute
8. Love Take Over
9. RSVP
10. Whenever You're Ready
11. Another Weekend
12. Somewhere Somebody
13. Rock My World
14. Strong as Steel (single version)

=== Disc 2 ===
1. Find the Time
2. Stay Out of My Life
3. There's a Brand New World
4. Let Me Be Yours
5. With Every Heartbeat
6. Hide and Seek
7. Now I'm In Control
8. Say Goodbye
9. Crazy
10. Winning
11. Please Don't Say Goodnight
12. Show Me What You've Got for Me
13. Are You Man Enough

=== Disc 3 ===
1. Don't You Know I Love It
2. Read Between the Lines
3. Live Giving Love
4. Ain't Watcha Do
5. Made Out of Love
6. You Should Have Waited
7. Knock Twice
8. Hard Race
9. Are You Really the One
10. Free Time
11. Physical Attraction
12. Godsend
13. Someone's In Love
14. Rescue Me
