= Exo-1,4-beta-D-glucosaminidase =

Identifiers
- EC no.: 3.2.1.165

Databases
- IntEnz: IntEnz view
- BRENDA: BRENDA entry
- ExPASy: NiceZyme view
- KEGG: KEGG entry
- MetaCyc: metabolic pathway
- PRIAM: profile
- PDB structures: RCSB PDB PDBe PDBsum
Search
- PMC: articles
- PubMed: articles
- NCBI: proteins

Exo-1,4-beta-D-glucosaminidase (EC 3.2.1.165, CsxA, GlcNase, exochitosanase, GlmA, exo-beta-D-glucosaminidase, chitosan exo-1,4-beta-D-glucosaminidase) is an enzyme with systematic name chitosan exo-(1->4)-beta-D-glucosaminidase.! This enzyme catalyses the following chemical reaction

Hydrolysis of chitosan or chitosan oligosaccharides to remove successive D-glucosamine residues from the non-reducing termini

Chitosan is a partially or totally N-deacetylated chitin derivative that is found in the cell walls of some phytopathogenic fungi .
