= Legendary =

Legendary may refer to:

- Legend, a folklore genre
- Legendary (hagiography)
- J. R. R. Tolkien's legendarium

== Film and television ==
- Legendary (2010 film), a 2010 American sports drama film
- Legendary (2013 film), a 2013 film featuring Dolph Lundgren
- Legendary (TV series), a 2020 American reality competition series
- "Legendary" (Legends of Tomorrow), a television episode

== Music ==
=== Albums ===
- Legendary (AZ album), 2009
- Legendary (The Summer Set album) or the title song, 2013
- Legendary (TQ album) or the title song, 2013
- Legendary (Tyga album) or the title song, 2019
- Legendary (Z-Ro album), 2016
- Legendary (Zao album), 2003
- Legendary, by Kaysha, 2006
- The Legendary, an EP by the Roots, 1999

=== Songs ===
- "Legendary" (Deadmau5 and Shotty Horroh song), 2017
- "Legendary" (Welshly Arms song), 2016
- "Legendary", by Alaska Thunderfuck from Anus, 2015
- "Legendary", by Daya from Daya, 2015
- "Legendary", by Royce da 5'9" from Success Is Certain, 2011
- "Legendary", by Skillet from Victorious, 2019
- "Legendary", by Joey Badass from All-Amerikkkan Badass, 2017
- "Legendary", by Jorge Rivera-Herrans from Epic: The Musical, 2024
- "Legendary" (Bon Jovi song), 2024

== Other uses ==
- Legendary (video game), a 2008 first-person shooter
- Legendary: A Marvel Deck Building Game, a board game
- Legendary Entertainment, an American film production and mass media company
  - Legendary Comics, an American comic book publisher founded in 2010
- Legendary Pokémon, a group of fictional species in the Pokémon franchise

== See also ==
- Legend (disambiguation)
