= Tales of Berseria =

2016 video game

- North American PlayStation 4 cover art
- Developers: Bandai Namco Studios; D.A.G Inc. (Remastered)
- Publisher: Bandai Namco Entertainment
- Director: Yoshimasa Tanaka
- Producer: Yasuhiro Fukaya
- Designer: Tatsuro Udo
- Artists: Mutsumi Inomata; Kōsuke Fujishima; Minoru Iwamoto; Daigo Okumura
- Writer: Naoki Yamamoto
- Composer: Motoi Sakuraba
- Series: Tales
- Engine: Unity (Remastered)
- Platforms: PlayStation 3; PlayStation 4; Windows; Remastered: Nintendo Switch; PlayStation 5; Windows; Xbox Series X/S
- Release: August 18, 2016: PlayStation 3; JP: August 18, 2016 PlayStation 4; JP: August 18, 2016; NA: January 24, 2017; PAL: January 27, 2017 Windows; WW: January 27, 2017 Remastered Nintendo Switch, PC, PS5, Xbox Series X/S; JP: February 26, 2026; WW: February 27, 2026
- Genre: Action role-playing
- Modes: Single-player, multiplayer

Tales of Berseria (Note: Japanese: テイルズ オブ ベルセリア, Hepburn: Teiruzu Obu Beruseria) is an action role-playing video game developed and published by Bandai Namco Entertainment for PlayStation 3, PlayStation 4, and Windows. It is the sixteenth main entry in the Tales series and a prequel of Tales of Zestiria. It was released in Japan for PlayStation 3 and PlayStation 4 in mid-August 2016, and was released worldwide for PlayStation 4 and Windows in late January 2017. A manga adaptation of this game was serialized in Ichijinsha's Monthly Comic Rex Magazine since October 2016. The third and last volume was published August 2018 with an English translation finishing April 2020.

Tales of Berseria Remastered, an updated port of the game, was released on February 26, 2026 for PlayStation 5, Xbox Series X/S consoles, Nintendo Switch and PC.

== Gameplay ==
A battle sequence from Tales of Berseria, demonstrating the HUD, character skills, and general setup of the Liberation Linear Motion Battle System

Tales of Berseria is a role-playing video game, where players navigate the game's world through the game's characters from a third-person perspective. As with previous Tales games, characters can interact through Skits, animated clips that play outside cutscenes and battle: characters are represented by head-and-shoulder portraits, and conversations can range from serious to comedic. New to the series Skit systems is a cut-in effect, where at certain moments within skits characters in various poses will appear in response to the dialogue.

As with previous Tales titles, the game uses a variation of the Linear Motion Battle System (LMBS). Berseria's version is dubbed the "Liberation-LMBS": when in the battle zone, players can freely move around the arena and rotate the camera at will. Characters fight using physical and magical attacks, along with performing skills known as Artes that have various effects on enemies such as stunning them or causing status ailments. Artes can be directly mapped to different control buttons. Abilities outside attacking include guarding against attacks, side-stepping around opponents, and escaping from battle.

A key element in battles is the Soul Gauge, which replaces the move-governing mechanics of earlier Tales games: each character has a separate gauge showing up to five Souls, which are used up when Artes are used. While characters can still attack with a depleted Soul Gauge, their attacks can be easily deflected by enemies, but the Soul Gauge automatically recharges with time. Souls are dropped by enemies in battle that can be "stolen" to refill the gauge, a mechanic that enemies can also use to steal Souls from the player. If enough of the Soul Gauge is full characters can activate unique states called the Break Soul, where they can exceed their combo limit and bring unique effects into battle: for instance, Velvet's Break Soul triggers her arm to become bestial and different elemental attacks are triggered depending on enemy type.

The main party consists of four characters, which can all be assigned as the controlled character during battle, with the other available playable characters held in reserve. While primarily designed for single-player, local multiplayer for battles is supported. A mechanic called the Switch Blast can be used when changing characters: by consuming a portion of the Blast Gauge, the controlled party member switches out for a reserve member, who delivers a free attack. The Blast Gauge is also depleted by performing power attacks called Mystic Artes.

== Story ==
=== Setting ===
Berseria takes place in the Holy Midgand Empire, a powerful country that rules over this world's archipelago of a continent. The game's world is shared with Tales of Zestiria, although the events occurred 1000 years before the latter. There are countless numbers of islands around, and Midgand's rule crosses even the seas. Areas of land and islands in the game are divided into "territories." Along with humans, one of the other main races is the Malakhim (singular: Malak), supernatural spirits whose wills are sealed and used by humans as slaves to utilize their magical abilities after being made visible to even normal humans due to the Advent, an incident 3 years before Velvet escaped from her prison. Throughout the empire, a disease known as Daemonblight causes those infected to lose their humanity and sense of rationality and transform into monsters known as Daemons, who pose a threat to the world. Along with the rulers of the Holy Midgand Empire exists a theocratic order known as the Abbey, which is of great political and religious importance and is influential in imperial affairs. The Exorcists, soldiers from the Abbey, are tasked with bringing peace and order by purging the world of Daemons and are willing to go to extremes to reach their goal.

=== Plot ===
When she was a child, Velvet Crowe and her younger brother Laphicet were saved by her brother-in-law Artorius when a Scarlet Night happened and daemons attacked their village; Velvet's pregnant older sister Celica was killed during the event known as the "Opening". Seven years later, Velvet takes care of her sickly brother with Artorius. The Scarlet Night returns, with the entire village succumbing to the Daemonblight: when Velvet finds Artorius, she sees him sacrifice her brother as part of a ritual, known as the "Advent". Artorius attempts to use her for the Advent as well, but she fights back and the Daemonblight possesses her arm, mutating it and turning her into a Daemon called a "Therion", with the ability to absorb Daemons. In a rage, she slaughters the nearby Daemons before passing out. She awakes in a prison for Daemons on the island Titania, swearing to kill Artorius and avenge her brother's murder. A group of beings known as Malakhim, who were previously only visible to "resonant" individuals, become visible to most people of the world after the "Advent". Over the next three years, Artorius forms the Abbey to bring peace to the Holy Midgand Empire, becoming the Abbey's "Shepherd" and is seen as a savior by the people for establishing the Exorcists using the malakhim.

After three years in prison, Velvet is freed by Seres, Artorius' former malak, who has broken away from him. During her escape, Velvet aids fellow prisoners Rokurou and Magilou and fights against the Praetor Exorcist Oscar Dragonia. Seres takes a fatal attack when Oscar turns one of his Malakhim servants into a dragon to face them. Absorbing Seres at her request, Velvet makes a final attack on Oscar that blinds him in one eye before he escapes. Velvet realizes at this point that Seres must be a reincarnation of her deceased sister, Celica. Velvet and company then escape the island. Throughout her journey to get her revenge, she also meets Laphicet, a Malak formerly in service to Praetor Exorcist Teresa Linares until being kidnapped and named by her; Eleanor, an Abbey Exorcist who questions their methods; and Eizen, a Malak who travels with pirates who grant the group sanctuary. They are also joined by Bienfu, a Normin Malak originally contracted with Magilou and who had since been bound to Eleanor while Magilou was imprisoned. Eleanor is initially reluctant to join Velvet, attempting suicide before being asked to spy on the group and then learning the Abbey's full plans.

The group learns that Artorius, Oscar, Teresa, and Legate Exorcists Shigure Rangetsu and Melchior Mayvin are trying to purge the Daemonblight by erasing all emotion from humankind: to do this, they need to summon Innominat, one of five powerful Malakim called the Empyreans, into the world. The Abbey has been creating Therions and feeding their power to Innominat to awaken him. The Abbey is ultimately successful, with Innominat taking on the form of Velvet's deceased brother. It is also revealed to the group early on that Daemonblight is an impurity called "malevolence" generated by the negative emotions of humanity, which can turn humans into Daemons, and that Daemons and Malakhim are visible to only humans who possess "resonance" in them. Artorius' actions caused humanity's latent resonance to be amplified, revealing Malakhim and Daemons. Laphicet is revealed to be the reincarnation of Celica's unborn son. Initially disheartened by the revelations, Velvet embraces her role as the "Lord of Calamity" who will topple the Abbey.

In order for the group to defeat Artorius and Innominat, they pursue each of the Exorcists, defeating them and using their souls as sacrifices to awaken the four Empyreans. They then face Artorius, who merges with Innominat in the final battle before Velvet kills him once and for all. Innominat begins going berserk, and Velvet decides to seal herself away with him, allowing him to feed off of the malevolence in her soul and feeding off of him in turn, so that Laphicet and the other Therions (whose lives are linked to Innominat's) can survive. Laphicet becomes Innominat's replacement with the help of the four Empyreans who would serve Laphicet as his Lords. Laphicet then transforms into a benevolent dragon and purifies the land of malevolence, at the cost of humans not being able to see the Malakhim. Eleanor decides to become a Shepherd to guide the people, Magilou records the events of the world in her role as a scribe, while Laphicet renames himself as "Maotelus"—these events set the scene for Tales of Zestiria, which will occur 1000 years later. The game ends with Velvet embracing Innominat and living in a never-ending dream of what might have been.

== Development ==
Development for Tales of Berseria began in the fall of 2014 at Bandai Namco Studios, after active development had finished on Zestiria. A notable change was Hideo Baba not acting as producer, his role instead being filled by Yasuhiro Fukaya while Baba himself took over general supervision of the Tales series. Yoshimasa Tanaka acted as director; the music was composed by Motoi Sakuraba; the battle system was designed by Tatsuro Udo; while the characters were designed by Mutsumi Inomata, Kōsuke Fujishima, Minoru Iwamoto and Daigo Okumura. While it is the first original Tales title to be developed for the PlayStation 4, it was also released on the PlayStation 3 in Japan: the game was first developed on PS3, then upgraded to PS4. Using a similar engine to past Tales titles, the majority of updating went into technical improvements to ensure smooth performance on all platforms. Berseria is intended to be the last mainline Tales title for seventh-generation consoles.

The scenario was written by Naoki Yamamoto, who had previously worked on Zestiria. Despite being a distant prequel to Tales of Zestiria—taking place in the distant past and containing references—the game's story was designed to be able to work on its own. This distant connection concept was inspired by the developer's wish to emulate the similar distant narrative connection between Tales of Phantasia and Tales of Symphonia. It also featured nods to earlier entries in the series, such as the party's ship being named after a similar transport ship in Tales of Eternia. The main theme of Tales of Berseria is the conflict between emotion and reason, with Velvet being the incarnation of emotion and rage. This theme is represented in the game's title, which stems from the term "Berserker", legendary warriors who were imbued with uncontrollable power. The game is the fifth in the series to feature a female protagonist and the second following Tales of Breaker to feature a sole female protagonist. As Milla Maxwell from Tales of Xillia, who shared her role of protagonist with male character Jude Mathis, had been popular with the Tales fanbase, it was decided that Berseria would have a female lead. The decision was also influenced by the growing demands for female lead characters in gaming, particularly from the West.

Bandai Namco Entertainment filed a trademark for the title, along with two other titles, on April 20, 2015. On June 6, 2015, the game was officially announced, including details on the protagonist Velvet, voiced by Rina Satou in Japanese and Cristina Vee in English and designed by Mutsumi Inomata. It was revealed that ufotable would animate the anime cutscenes, as the game's opening movie was revealed four days before the game's release in Japan at the end of Episode 6 of Tales of Zestiria the X. The game was described as the final part of the company's 20th anniversary celebrations for the Tales series. The game's year of release was announced in December 2015, while its western release for PS4 and Microsoft Windows was confirmed the following week. The game's theme song, "Burn", was composed and performed by Flow, with Japanese vocals being retained in the Western version. Its characteristic genre name, a recurring feature of the series, is Kimi ga kimirashiku ikiru tame no ārupījī (君が君らしく生きるためのRPG, lit. "RPG of Discovering your Own Reason to Live"). For the game's Western release, the scene where Artorius kills Velvet's brother Laphicet was altered: rather than stabbing him directly with his sword, Artorius sacrifices him through a magical ceremony, reducing the level of violence while keeping the dramatic significance of the scene intact. This alteration was made to keep the game's age rating within acceptable levels, with particular reference being given to preserving the "16" rating given by Europe's Pan European Game Information board. In a later statement Bandai Namco stated that, aside from text and dialogue variations that were standard for the game's Japanese-to-English localization, no other content had been altered for the Western release. On December 10, 2016, Bandai Namco America posted its apology for the changes of scenes in charge of localization.

On November 19, 2025, Bandai Namco announced an updated version of the game for PlayStation 5, Xbox Series X/S, Nintendo Switch and Microsoft Windows platforms, titled Tales of Berseria Remastered, using the western release as its basis.

== Reception ==
Reception

Aggregate scores
Aggregator	Score
Metacritic	(PS4) 79/100 (PC) 80/100
OpenCritic	68% recommend(Remaster) (Note: Based on 56 reviews)

Review scores
Publication	Score
Destructoid	8/10
Famitsu	35/40
IGN	8.8/10
Dengeki PlayStation	92.5/100

The game received a positive reception overall. Aggregate site Metacritic gave the PS4 and PC versions of the game scores of 79/100 and 80/100 respectively. Famitsu gave Tales of Berseria a score of 35 out of 40 based on four reviews. Among the positive comments made were some directed toward its story and characters along with aspects of its gameplay. The reviewers' main criticisms were leveled against some lack of originality in the gameplay and disappointment that the game did not better utilize the graphical power of the PS4. Dengeki PlayStation praised the story and characters, particularly noting Satō's performance as Velvet, and said the battles were the most enjoyable in the series to date. However, they also criticized the tutorials as being too long, wanted faster character movement earlier in the game, and said that series newcomers might be overwhelmed by the number of aspects to learn.

Meghan Sullivan from IGN gave Tales of Berseria a score of 8.8/10, praising the emotional storytelling, diverse cast of characters, and how Velvet felt more like an anti-hero compared to protagonists of prior entries of the Tales series. Some criticisms were about the generic look of some of the game's environments and how much backtracking was required through old locations to advance through the game.

=== Accolades ===
Year	Award	Category	Result	Ref.
2018	National Academy of Video Game Trade Reviewers Awards	Performance in a Drama, Supporting (Monica Rial)	Nominated	
2018	National Academy of Video Game Trade Reviewers Awards	Song, Original or Adapted ("Burn")	Nominated	
