= Tales of Zestiria the X =

Japanese anime television series

- Main visual

テイルズ オブ ゼスティリア ザ X(クロス) (Teiruzu Obu Zesutiria Za Kurosu)
- Anime television series
- Directed by: Haruo Sotozaki
- Produced by: Tomoko Takehara; Koichiro Tomita; Hikari Kondo; Kenichi Yatomi; Yohei Kisara
- Written by: Hikaru Kondo
- Music by: Motoi Sakuraba; Go Shiina
- Studio: Ufotable
- Licensed by: AUS: Madman Entertainment; NA: Crunchyroll
- Original network: Tokyo MX, Sun TV, KBS, TV Aichi, BS11
- Original run: July 3, 2016 – April 29, 2017
- Episodes: 26

Tales of Zestiria the X (テイルズ オブ ゼスティリア ザ X(クロス), Teiruzu Obu Zesutiria Za Kurosu; pronounced "Tales of Zestiria the Cross") is a Japanese anime television series based on both Tales of Zestiria and Tales of Berseria video games developed by Bandai Namco Studios and tri-Crescendo, and published by Bandai Namco Entertainment. It is produced by Ufotable, directed by Haruo Sotozaki and written by Hikaru Kondo, featuring character designs by Akira Matsushima and music by Motoi Sakuraba and Go Shiina. The anime series is split into two halves: the first half premiered on July 3, 2016, and finished airing on September 25, 2016. The second half premiered on January 8, 2017, and finished airing on April 29, 2017.

== Plot ==
Tales of Zestiria the X takes place in a world where there are beings called Seraphim. Humans and Seraphim used to live together in harmony thousands of years ago. The humans prayed to the Seraphim, and in return the Seraphim blessed them. The Seraphim have magical powers and their own element to control. Earth, wind, water, or fire. There were thousands of Seraphim, but mankind was awash with terrible emotions, and could easily be overcome and turn into monsters. When Seraphim became too connected to a human, seeing their friend physically and mentally turn into a monster caused them to despair and their ephemeral forms were quickly turned into monsters as well. The monsters were created when an area was thick with negative emotions that created a dangerous byproduct called malevolence. Malevolence turns any weak or negative living creature into a monster. While Seraphim are turned into powerful dragons, all other living creatures are turned into monsters called Hellions when they are taken over by malevolence.

The Seraphim kept nature running smoothly and in balance, while a person called the Shepherd kept the malevolence at bay. The Shepherd is a regular person until they are able to pull a sacred sword from a stone. Then they become a living legend with the power to purify all Hellions. They can form contracts with Seraphim and combine their bodies so they can use their elemental powers to purify dangerous creatures. They can also form contracts with humans, who help carry the burden of malevolence. While forming contracts with Seraphim has no adverse consequences, humans are a different story. Should the Shepherd die, so will the humans that have a contract with him or her. Also, the more humans the Shepard has contracts with, the heavier the burden on the Shepherd. They can weigh him or her down and cause problems if there are too many.

Shepherds and Seraphim belong to legend now. No one has seen either in centuries. The story goes that humans grew selfish and cruel enough to lose the sight, and the Seraphim slipped out of view rather than out of existence.

Then a princess meets a young man raised inside a Seraphim village, someone who sees them, touches them, and talks to them as easily as he talks to her. He wants a world where the two can live alongside each other again. What he lacks is any power to build it.

What humans can no longer see has been growing all along, and it is nearly done. A princess and one boy who refuses to stop hoping stand between it and everyone else.

== Characters ==
=== Zestiria characters ===
Sorey (スレイ, Surei)
Voiced by: Robbie Daymond (English); Ryōhei Kimura (Japanese)
Mikleo (ミクリオ, Mikurio)
Voiced by: Philip Lamont (English); Ryōta Ōsaka (Japanese)
Alisha Diphda (アリーシャ・ディフダ, Arīsha Difuda)
Voiced by: Alexis Tipton (English); Ai Kayano (Japanese)
Lailah (ライラ, Raira)
Voiced by: Carrie Keranen (English); Noriko Shitaya (Japanese)
Rose (ロゼ, Roze)
Voiced by: Caitlin Glass (English); Mikako Komatsu (Japanese)
Edna (エドナ, Edona)
Voiced by: Kira Buckland (English); Misato Fukuen (Japanese)
Dezel (デゼル, Dezeru)
Voiced by: Chris Niosi (English); Daisuke Ono (Japanese)
Zaveid (ザビーダ, Zabīda; pronounced "Zaveed")
Voiced by: Ian Sinclair (English); Kenjiro Tsuda (Japanese)

=== Berseria characters ===
Velvet Crowe (ベルベット・クラウ,, Berubetto Kurau)
Voiced by: Rina Satō
Rokurou Rangetsu (ロクロウ・ランゲツ,, Rokurō Rangetsu)
Voiced by: Daisuke Kishio
Magilou (マギルゥ,, Magirū)
Voiced by: Satomi Satō
Oscar Dragonia (オスカー・ドラゴニア,, Osukaa Doragonia)
Voiced by: Tomoaki Maeno
Seres (シアリーズ, Shiarizu)
Voiced by: Satomi Arai

== Production and release ==
An anime television series adaptation of the video game, titled Tales of Zestiria the X, which is animated by Ufotable, was announced at the Tales of Festival 2015. The original plans for the anime was about Tales of Berseria and its promotion before its release, hence the reason why the game makes an adapted appearance. The series is directed by Haruo Sotozaki and written by Ufotable staff. Akira Matsushima adapted the original character designs for the anime, while the art director is Minji Kim. The music is composed by Motoi Sakuraba and Go Shiina. The main voice actors from the game reprised their roles in the series except for Lailah's voice actress Miyu Matsuki, who died in 2015 and was replaced by Noriko Shitaya. The series was originally announced for broadcast sometime in July 2016.

The first half of the anime television series adaptation aired from July 3, 2016, to September 25, 2016. The opening theme song for the first half was "Kaze no Uta" by Flow, while the ending theme was "Calling" by Fhána. The second half aired from January 8, 2017, to April 29, 2017. The opening theme for the second half is "Illuminate" by Minami Kuribayashi and the ending theme is "Innosense" by Flow.

The anime had been licensed by Funimation and by Madman Entertainment for streaming. Following Sony's acquisition of Crunchyroll, the series was moved to Crunchyroll. Daisuki later added the series to their streaming service, via Anime Consortium Japan alongside Rewrite, Fate/Grand Order ~First Order~ and Blue Exorcist Kyoto Saga.
