= North American Fur Auctions =

Canadian company

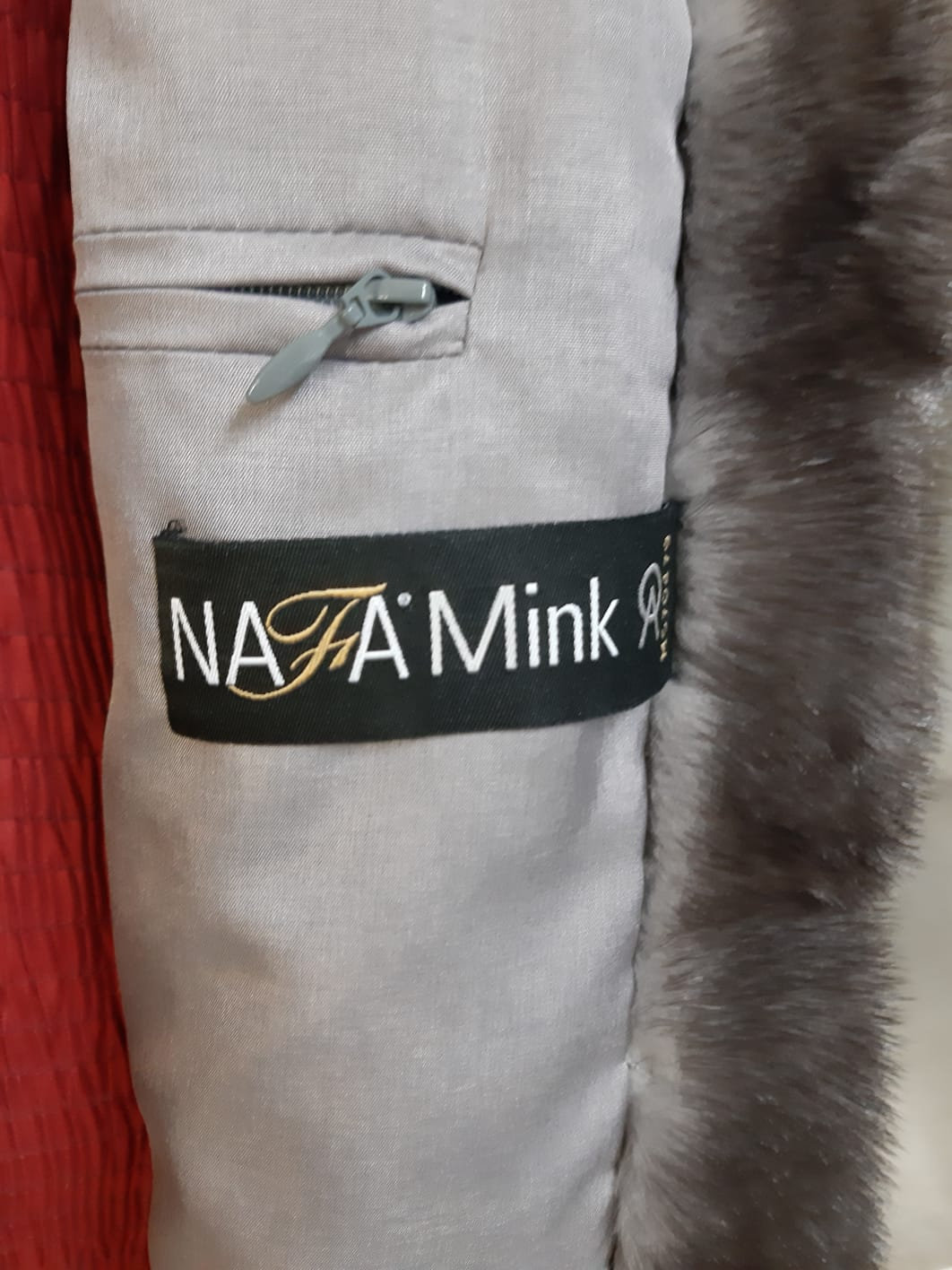
North American Fur Auctions label in a German made mink jacket

North American Fur Auctions (commonly known as NAFA) is a Canadian company that auctions on consignment fur pelts harvested in Canada and the United States. Its services are used by both large fur farms and small-time trappers. Its auctions are held three to four times a year in Toronto. It is the largest fur auction house in North America, and the second largest in the world.

In its May 2008 auction, NAFA handled nearly 3.5 million pelts. Animal types included otter, sable, beaver, raccoon, coyote, red fox, grey fox, lynx, bobcat, fisher, muskrat, mink, silver fox, badger, skunk, opossum, squirrel, ermine, timber wolf, wolverine and black bear.

NAFA is the successor to the Hudson's Bay Company's Canadian and U.S. fur auction businesses, which were spun off in 1987 and 1989, respectively. In 2019, NAFA filed for creditor protection (CCAA).

== Communications ==
NAFA is a founding member of the North American Fur Industry Communications group (NAFIC), established in 2013 as a cooperative public educational program for the fur industry in Canada and the USA. NAFIC disseminates information via the Internet under the brand name “Truth About Fur”.
