= Pokémon Legends =

Pokémon Legends is a subseries of the core series of Pokémon games:

- Pokémon Legends: Arceus, released in 2022
- Pokémon Legends: Z-A, released in 2025
