= Addendum =

Addition made to a document following its publication

An addendum or appendix, in general, is an addition required to be made to a document by its author subsequent to its printing or publication. It comes from the gerundive addendum, plural addenda, "that which is to be added", from addere (lit. ''give toward'', compare with memorandum, agenda, corrigenda).

== Specific uses ==
=== In books ===
An addendum may explain inconsistencies or expand the existing work or otherwise explain or update the information found in the main work, especially if any such problems were detected too late to correct the main work. For example, the main work could have had already been printed and the cost of destroying the batch and reprinting it deemed too high. As such, addenda may come in many forms—a separate letter included with the work, text files on a digital medium, or any similar carrier. It may serve to notify the reader of errors present, as errata.

=== In contracts and other legal documents ===
In other documents, most importantly in legal contracts, an addendum is an additional document not included in the main part of the contract. It is an ad hoc item, usually compiled and executed after the main document, which contains additional terms, obligations or information. An Additional Agreement to a contract is often an addendum to a contract and is simply referred to as being an extension or addition to a main contract. In today's business world additional authorisation subjects such as company seals are not usually required unless stipulated in the original agreement.

It is to be distinguished from other appendices to a contract which may contain additional terms, specifications, provisions, standard forms or other information which have been separated out from the main body of the contract. These are called: an appendix (general term), an annex (which includes information, usually large texts or tables, which are independent stand-alone works which have been included in the contract, such as a tax table, or a large excerpt from a book), or an exhibit (often used in court cases),

Similarly an attachment is used usually for e-mails, while an enclosure is used with a paper letter.

Addenda are often used in standard form contracts to make changes or add specific detail. For example, an addendum might be added to a contract to change a date or add details as to delivery of goods or pricing. The addendum should be referenced in the contract, or the contract should be referenced in the addendum, so that it is clear which contract the addendum is modifying.

A rider is often used to add specific detail and especially specific conditions to a standard contract such as an insurance contract. A rider may also be added to a piece of legislation.

Schedules and exhibits are sub-categories of addenda, with schedules being related to numerical and time information, such as pricing and time-schedules, and exhibits used for examples of standard forms or additional information necessary for the parties to understand and/or comply with their contractual obligations. Outside of contract law, exhibits are often used in legal documents filed with a court as part of judicial proceedings such as motions, briefs and the submission of different types of evidence for inclusion in the record of trial of a particular case.

=== In legal judgments ===
Juries in inquests or trials may amplify or explain their decisions by issuing a commentary known as a rider, as in the prosecution of Harold Greenwood and the inquest of Jean Charles de Menezes. This practice persisted in the United Kingdom and Ireland until the 1970s. In inquests, these riders influenced decisions by local authorities regarding physical infrastructure, and decisions by employers about safe working practices. In trials, they influenced the sentencing decisions of judges, and the decision by central government whether a particular person convicted of a capital crime should be executed.

=== In medical transcription ===
Addendum is also used if the medical care staff is inserting additional information about the patient.

=== In engineering ===
The addendum is the radial distance from the pitch circle of a cogwheel, worm wheel, etc., to the crests of the teeth or ridges. This is also the radial height of a tooth above the pitch circle.

== See also ==
- Erratum
- Postscript
