= Tales of Zestiria =

2015 video game

- Box art of the Japanese release, also used for worldwide release
- Developer: Bandai Namco Studios
- Publisher: Bandai Namco Entertainment
- Directors: Yuuta Hase; Mari Miyata
- Producer: Hideo Baba
- Designers: Hikaru Kondo; Tatsuro Udo
- Artists: Minoru Iwamoto; Kōsuke Fujishima; Mutsumi Inomata; Daigo Okumura
- Writers: Naoki Yamamoto; Takashi Hasegawa
- Composers: Motoi Sakuraba; Go Shiina
- Series: Tales
- Platforms: PlayStation 3; PlayStation 4; Windows
- Release: January 22, 2015: PlayStation 3; JP: 22 January 2015; EU: 16 October 2015; NA: 20 October 2015 PlayStation 4; JP: 7 July 2016; EU: 16 October 2015; NA: 20 October 2015 Windows; EU: 16 October 2015; NA: 20 October 2015
- Genre: Action role-playing game
- Modes: Single-player; Multiplayer

Tales of Zestiria (Note: Tales of Zestiria (Japanese: テイルズ オブ ゼスティリア, Hepburn: Teiruzu Obu Zesutiria)) is an action role-playing game. It is the fifteenth main entry in the Tales series, developed by Bandai Namco Studios and published by Bandai Namco Entertainment. It was released in January 2015 in Japan on the PlayStation 3. For Western release in October of the same year, it was also ported to PlayStation 4 and Windows via Steam. The PS4 version was released in Japan in July 2016. As with previous entries in the Tales series, the game uses a variation of the action-based Linear Motion Battle System, with additional elements including a navigable open world, and the ability for certain characters to fuse into a single entity in battle to deliver powerful attacks.

The story follows Sorey, a young man blessed with powers by a mystical spirit race known as the Seraphim who act as a stabilizing force in the land, as he travels to free the land of Glenwood from the threat of the Hellion, creatures spawned by negative emotions. The game's characteristic genre name is Jōnetsu ga sekai o terasu ārupījī (情熱が世界を照らすRPG, lit. "RPG of Passion Lighting the World"), with its story focusing on the passion of the characters.

The game began development in 2012 as the 20th anniversary title for the Tales series, returning to the series' thematic roots as established in Tales of Phantasia and featuring revamped gameplay systems. Multiple staff members from previous Tales games returned, including producer Hideo Baba, battle programmer Tatsuro Udo, designers Kōsuke Fujishima and Mutsumi Inomata, and composers Motoi Sakuraba and Go Shiina. It has received positive reviews in Japanese gaming magazines, and shipped over 400,000 units in its first week. It has similarly garnered mixed to positive reviews in the west, with the majority of praise going to the battle system while its story and presentation received a mixed response. Despite the praise, it has received criticism from fans in Japan for its handling of the game's characters.

== Gameplay ==
Tales of Zestiria is an action role-playing game set in a fantasy world with three-dimensional characters rendered to scale with the areas around them. The game's main world employs an open world layout, in contrast to previous entries in the series. Skits, extra conversations between characters that can be either dramatic or comical, also return; their full-body representation of characters is carried over from Tales of Graces. As in Graces and Tales of Xillia, they are fully voiced. During exploration of the field area between locations and while a specific Seraph character is assigned, the player can execute special commands; they are slicing through minor obstacles (all characters), smashing large obstacles (Edna), temporarily shielding themselves from enemy view (Mikleo), igniting special lights in dungeons (Lailah), or teleporting across gaps (Dezel). A changeable second character accompanies the lead character, and story-relevant or trivial conversations can be started with them. Characters all have unique Support Talents, which range from locating treasure chests to monitoring a characters health, which can be leveled up along with the characters.

New special abilities for characters are gained by performing side-quests for creatures called Normins scattered through the land. Equipment assigned to characters can be given special skills, with one piece of equipment having four skill slots. Certain combinations add additional effects produced by equipment. Some equipment types can only be obtained by fusing two different accessories. A local four-player multiplayer option is also available. Items such as outfits, weapons and armor and items can be bought and sold at shops across the land. Using a certain shop enough levels it up, unlocking higher-end items. During exploration, players visit various regions under the control of Lords of the Land, which require the protection of the Seraphim. Ensuring this protection gives the player access via the Lords of the Land to abilities such as warping between save points for a fee. Other abilities including various abilities and bonuses unlocked by completing certain objectives in battle and establish further Normin. The player can increase these boons by leveling up the strength of the protection through battles in the area. Players can rest characters at inns, restoring their health and magic meters.

=== Battle system ===
A battle sequence from Tales of Zestiria, demonstrating the Fusionic Chain Linear Motion Battle System, with player character Sorey triggering Armatization

As with previous titles in the series, the game uses the series's action-based Linear Motion Battle System (LMBS). The variant used in Zestiria is called the Fusionic Chain LMBS. Unlike previous entries in the series, which featured a separate battle screen, battles in the open field and environments like towns and dungeons take place in the same space as exploration. These encounters are called "Real Map Battles". The player characters' fighting ability during this battle can be affected by the topography and features such as ponds and rocks. Preemptively attacking enemies also grants the player an advantage during the battle. Like previous entries in the series, the LMBS incorporates special skills called artes. There are two types of artes: human characters specialize in close-quarters melee-based artes, while Seraph characters employ mid-to-long range magical artes. These artes are further divided into multiple categories for each character. Artes can interrupt standard attacks. Alongside standard attacks and artes, characters can cast spells for actions such as healing or attacking enemies. The standard attacks, artes and spells are governed by a rock-paper-scissors system. Special attacks called Mystic Artes (Note: 秘奥義, Hi Ougi) can be performed which deal high damage, with each character having a unique Mystic Arte.

While in battle, characters status is displayed in special windows on the battle screen: their window shows their current health, their Blast gauge (an energy bar linked to special abilities), and Spirit Chain (SC) gauge, which fuels the ability to link characters and perform special attacks. A high level of SC points grants conditional boons to characters, such as dealing higher damage and faster recovery of SC. Characters have the option to side-step (dodge forward, backward or to the side), and precisely timed dodges can allow characters to stagger enemies and fill the SC gauge. The Blast gauge allows characters to trigger a blast of energy which knocks enemies back and heals injuries. The SC gauge allows for a maximum of four linked attacks, and any remaining points in the gauge can be used for later linked attacks. The order of activation for linked attacks cannot be changed. At the end of battles, if certain requirements are fulfilled, characters can learn skills called Battle Acts, abilities that grant the characters advantages in battle, such as being able to run around the field freely.

The characters Sorey and Rose can also perform "Armatization", (Note: 神依, Kamui; lit. "Divine Reliance") which fuses either of them with a chosen Seraph partner to produce a powerful hybrid form, which can perform magical attacks indicative of the element the Seraph represents. While in this form, the human character's stats are boosted, and they gain special abilities unique to the fusion: the character can wield a large sword and fire-based magic (Lailah), shoot water arrows using a bow (Mikleo), use stone fists and summon stone pillars (Edna), and gain blade-like wings and summon whirlwinds (Dezel/Zaveid). A character can swap out their Seraph partners while not in this form. Both characters capable of Armatization can be in this form at the same time. If the human character is defeated on the field, activating Armatization will resurrect them if their current Seraph partner is still active. There is a maximum of four party members allowed in battle, with one human being linked to one Seraph.

== Plot ==
=== Setting ===
Tales of Zestiria takes place on a fictional continent named Glenwood. Glenwood is set in the middle of an ocean-dominated world, sharing its setting with Tales of Berseria, the latter being set in the distant past of Zestiria's world. Glenwood is divided between two warring countries: the Hyland Kingdom, which is ruled by a constitutional monarchy, and the Rolance Empire. Existing independently are multiple Guilds, who readily profit from the conflict and encompass multiple professions from transportation to goods manufacture to assassination. Throughout the land, an impurity known as "malevolence" generated by the negative emotions of humanity periodically transforms the living, the dead and even inanimate objects into monsters called the Hellion, (Note: 憑魔, Hyōma; lit. "Possessing Evil") who pose a threat to the world. Along with humans, one of the main races of the world is the Seraphim, (Note: 天族, Tenzoku; lit. "Heavenly Race") supernatural humanoids and animals who can only interact with humans with sufficient resonance in them. Though once an abundant people in Glenwood, the Seraphim have become scarce. The people of the world call those who interact with the Seraphim "Shepherds", (Note: 導師, Dōshi; lit. "Monks") and they are both hailed as saviors and feared because of their power. The Shepherds have frequently appeared during times of crisis, and have entered into common folklore along with the Seraphim. Seraphim can also form contracts between themselves, with one dominant figure called a "Prime Lord" and a number of partners called "Sub Lords" who act as supports for them. The game tells the story of the Shepherds during the "Era of Chaos", when the Hellion are running rampant across Glenwood, attacking both the countryside and cities. Dragons play an important role in both the world lore and main story arc, but do not follow their traditional representation as beings of good and evil or symbolic creatures; rather, they are actually Seraphim who are corrupted by [the aforementioned] malevolence.

=== Story ===
The game begins with a young human called Sorey and his friend Mikleo, a Seraph of water, exploring some nearby ruins when they rescue a human girl, Alisha, and bring her back home in the village of Elysia. Once Alisha departs back home, Sorey and Mikleo have a short clash with a Hellion called Lunarre. Fearing for Alisha's safety, they decide to leave the village in search of her. While looking for Alisha's whereabouts, Sorey has an encounter with Lailah, a Seraph of fire known as the Lady of the Lake, who makes a pact as his Prime Lord, granting him the power to purify the Hellions and making him a Shepherd. After Sorey reunites with Alisha, who is revealed to be a princess to the Hyland Kingdom, she becomes his "Squire" to fight the Hellions by his side, and the party starts traveling the continent purifying the Hellions and searching for the main source of the malevolence that plagues the land into an Era of Chaos, the individual known as the "Lord of Calamity". During their travels Sorey and the others have a short encounter with Zaveid, a rogue Seraph of wind who hunts down Hellions on his own accord, and befriend Edna, an earth Seraph who also joins the party. However, Alisha's low resonance with the Seraphim takes a toll on Sorey's body and she is forced to leave the group.

When a war between Hyland and the neighboring Rolance Empire breaks out, Alisha is used by Hyland's military as leverage to force Sorey and his friends to take part in a battle. During the skirmish, Heldalf, the Lord of Calamity himself, appears before Sorey and he is almost killed, being rescued in the nick of time by an assassin called Rose. After recovering, Sorey learns that there are four shrines with trials that a Shepherd must accomplish in order to become stronger, and decides that he must clear them first before challenging Heldalf again. During his journeys, it is discovered that Rose has a high level of resonance and she becomes Sorey's Squire, joining the party along Dezel, a Seraph of wind who was guarding Rose as part of a secret agenda. After the party completes the four trials, they fall into a trap by Symonne, a fallen Seraph who works under Heldalf. It is then revealed that Dezel's true objective was to enact revenge on Symonne for causing the death of his friend and disgracing Rose's guild. Rose is severely wounded during the battle, forcing Dezel to sacrifice himself in order to protect her, and Zaveid joins the party afterwards.

Sorey and his friends then confront Heldalf again, but figure out that something is amiss as he does not show any intention to kill them immediately, as after failing to provoke Sorey, Heldalf attempts to convince him to join his side. This prompts the party to retreat and look for the true reason behind his motives before their final confrontation. It is revealed that the Era of Chaos was initiated when the previous Shepherd turned Heldalf, a Rolance military general at the time, into a cursed immortal being by fusing him with the fallen Seraph Maotelus when he refused to provide aid to his village when it was invaded: this filled his life with hatred and turned him into the Lord of Calamity. It was also revealed that two infants from the village, Sorey and Mikleo, were saved and taken in to be raised with the Seraphim. With the truth revealed and understood, the Shepherd and his comrades take on Heldalf once again and defeat him once and for all, turning Heldalf back into his human self and finally ending his life, giving him the peace he craved. Sorey then merges with Maotelus to expel the malevolence from the world and usher in a new era, where both the Seraphim and humans finally live together peacefully. In a post-credits sequence, a future Mikleo is shown exploring some ruins, and is saved from a fall by a reawakened Sorey.

=== Main characters ===
- Sorey (スレイ, Surei) is a human raised by the Seraphim. Because of his upbringing, he possesses high levels of resonance, allowing him to interact with the Seraphim. Due to becoming a Shepherd after entering into a pact with Lailah, Sorey holds the power to purify the Hellion. In battle, he wields a sword and is capable of Armatization. Sorey is designed by Kōsuke Fujishima.
- Mikleo (ミクリオ, Mikurio) is the Seraph aligned with the element of Water, and Sorey's childhood best friend. He acts as a contrast to Sorey, being cool and considerate, but because of this he has a very strong bond of friendship with him. Mikleo fights with a long Earth-based staff and Water-based seraphic artes. He is designed by Mutsumi Inomata.
- Alisha Diphda (アリーシャ・ディフダ, Arīsha Difuda) is a princess to the Hyland Kingdom. Due to her mother's low status and the decreasing importance of the kingdom's monarchy, she is treated poorly by the royal family, and decides to become a knight. While initially unable to see and interact with the Seraphim as Sorey can, she enters a pact with him to become a "Squire", a servant of the Shepherd with limited magic and the ability to see the Seraphim. Due to conflicting loyalties and patriotism, and negative effects on Sorey due to lacking resonance within her that is taking its toll on Sorey, she leaves the party early in the story. Alisha wields a long spear in battle. She is designed by Okumura.
- Rose (ロゼ, Roze; Rosé in Japanese) is a young human woman who joins Sorey's quest, originally seen as a member of the "Sparrowfeathers" (Note: セキレイの羽, Sekirei no Hane) merchant's guild. Although possessing high levels of resonance similar to Sorey, an incident in her youth removed her ability to see the Seraphim until she becomes a "Squire" to Sorey. During gameplay, she fights using twin daggers and is capable of Armatization. Officially, she is classified as a playable accompanying character, as opposed to accompanying NPCs such as Claire Bennett in Tales of Rebirth. Rose is designed by Fujishima.
- Lailah (ライラ, Raira) is a Seraph aligned with the element of Fire. She acts as a tutor to Sorey, and forms a pact with him when he wishes to become a Shepherd. Lailah becomes a Prime Lord to Mikleo, Edna and Dezel/Zaveid as Sub Lords, being the senior member of the partnership. Though she is knowledgeable, she is prone to delusional outbursts if provoked. Lailah fights with book pages and Fire-based seraphic artes. She is designed by Inomata.
- Edna (エドナ, Edona): Edna is a Seraph aligned with the element of Earth. While she has a pretty and petite exterior, she has a cold personality and has a hatred for humans. However, when it comes to her brother, she is prone to outbursts of emotion. Edna uses her parasol in combat and utilizes Earth-based seraphic artes. She is designed by Minoru Iwamoto.
- Dezel (デゼル, Dezeru) is a Seraph aligned with the element of Wind. Working in secret among the human population, he seeks vengeance against the Hellion after they killed a close friend. He is also considered an outlaw by the humans and the Seraphim. Dezel uses whip-like pendulums and Wind-based seraphic artes in battle. He is designed by Daigo Okumura.
- Zaveid (ザビーダ, Zabīda; pronounced "Zaveed") is a Seraph also aligned with the element of Wind. Though he also fights the Hellion, he is generally a prankster and shares some form of connection with Dezel, he is also dangerous due to his uncertain allegiance and his willingness to fight Sorey. Zaveid fights with whip-like pendulums and Wind-based seraphic artes too. The character is designed by Iwamoto.

== Development ==
Tales of Zestiria began production at Bandai Namco Studios in 2011, roughly three years prior to its release. Japanese developer tri-Crescendo helped with the game's programming. The game was conceived as a 20th anniversary title for the series, incorporating classic elements with new gameplay ideas. The story focuses on the theme of the casts' passion in pursuing their beliefs, in contrast to other entries in the series where the theme was justice or faith: the title "Zestiria" refers to the "zest" of the main characters. It also focused on the series theme of coexistence between different peoples and races. The game also returned to a medieval European high fantasy setting involving dragons, as opposed to the previous recent entries such as Tales of Xillia and its sequel. Producer Hideo Baba wanted to return to the themetic roots of the Tales series first explored in Tales of Phantasia to celebrate the series' anniversary. When beginning development, the team built off the basics established in the Xillia games. The game's main director was Yuuta Hase, who had previously helped develop the gameplay systems for the Xillia games. In helping develop the gameplay systems, he was initially in a deadlock with the rest of team about developing the new functions while maintaining traditional elements. Roughly two hundred staff worked on the game, double the number of the previous mainline Tales game Xillia 2.

The main scenario writer was Naoki Yamamoto, who had previously written the scripts for Tales of Hearts and the Xillia games. He wrote the script keeping the concept of a long and fun journey in mind, and developed Sorey as a mature character representing the game's central theme. Yamamoto worked closely with the team to ensure the story and gameplay relations between human and Seraphim characters were consistent. The concept of the Seraphim being a race invisible to humans was established early in development. This created difficulties in fitting a normal quest structure around this. The story was constructed around Alisha's departure from the party, with the development team adjusting the outfits sold for her as downloadable content (DLC) could also be worn by Rose. While Alisha's DLC scenario hinted at a continuation of the story, Zestiria and its story DLC were a self-contained experience, with no subsequent DLC scenarios planned. The final script covered six script books, including one for battle dialogue. In hindsight, there were concerns from staff that the scenario had not gone very deeply into the characters' psychologies, lessening its potential appeal, with Baba saying that they would attempt to take a more involved approach in future titles.

The characters were designed by Kōsuke Fujishima, Mutsumi Inomata, Daigo Okumura, and Minoru Iwamoto, all of whom worked on previous Tales titles. Iwamoto also acted as the game's art director. As part of the character designs, the artists reversed the physical stereotypes associated with the classical elements used by the main Seraphim characters: as stated examples, the fire Seraph Laliah was made petite and gentle in appearance, while the earth Seraph Edna was both shorter than the other characters and wielded great power over a potent element. Extensive work was needed to make environments distinctive so players would not get lost during exploration. Anime studio Ufotable created the game's opening and anime cutscenes. Iwamoto worked with Ufotable to make sure the opening successfully conveyed the personalities of the main characters.

Tatsuro Udo, battle programmer for Eternia, Rebirth and Graces, helped design the battle system. During the beginning of development, the team had to recreate the basic gameplay from the Xillia games to work off, which proved a difficult task for the team. The battle system was intended to combine familiar elements from previous installments with new ideas intended to refresh the series. Creating the seamless transition between exploration and combat, as well as implementing Armitization, proved to be difficult for the team. The idea of encountering and fighting enemies in the same space as exploration was designed to help evoke a fresh sense of adventure for players, as the team felt the previous method of transferring to a separate battle arena was limiting the series' development. Until the battle system's completion, development of other systems related to it was slow. As part of this development, a completely new engine had to be developed for the game, rather than just modified their old engine as they did in the past. Because of a staff shortage, developing the game was harder than previous titles and took a longer time. The PlayStation 3 was chosen as the original platform of release as the next generation of gaming hardware had yet to take off in Japan in terms of sales, and Bandai Namco was unwilling to take the risk of releasing on platforms with low install bases.

=== Music ===
The music for Zestiria was composed by Motoi Sakuraba and Go Shiina. Due to the title's status as an anniversary title and the popularity of both composers with the Tales series fanbase, it was decided that they should co-compose the soundtrack. During his work on the project, Sakuraba was involved in the composition of over one hundred tracks. The standard and boss battle themes were intended to evoke the atmosphere of the series as a whole. Shiina, who worked on thirty of the game's tracks, encountered difficulties expressing his musical style in the soundtrack. His role included focusing on thematic themes for Alisha, Zaveid and the Dragons. He included choral work in some of the tracks related to the Seraphim. The game's official soundtrack was released on 18 February 2015. Selected tracks from the game were included on a disc in the European and North American Collector's Editions.

The game's theme song, "White Light", was composed and performed for the game by J-pop group Superfly. Superfly developed the song alongside the game, with the band being allowed to view the material for inspiration. The title was inspired by the idea of people starting out with a "white canvas" and coloring it through their lives. The single was released digitally on iTunes the day before Zestiria's release and was also the lead single of Superfly's fifth album White, released on 27 May 2015. The western releases use an instrumental version of the song in the opening, due to licensing issues.

== Release and promotion ==
Launch trailer

The Tales of Zestiria trademark was registered in Japan, Europe, and North America between August and September 2013. Bandai launched a website in November as a teaser campaign which counted down for 12 December 2013; A live stream date for Niconico went live after the countdown. The game was revealed through the live stream. Localizations for North America, South America, and Europe were announced afterwards. Shortly after the game's announcement, it was revealed that character designs and story writing were complete, while the battle system and graphics were still being finalized. In April, the game's characteristic genre name was unveiled as Jonetsu ga sekai o terasu RPG (情熱が世界を照らすRPG, lit. "RPG of Passion Lighting the World"). The game was released in Japan on 22 January 2015, and it was released in Europe, Australia, and North America in October 2015.

Starting in October 2014, Bandai Namco began a promotional campaign for the game, starting with offering Zestiria with a 30% price cut on PlayStation Network. PlayStation Plus members got a further 20% discount. A Zestiria-themed PS3 controller was released in Japan as part of a collaboration with video game accessory company Hori. It included a cleaning cloth featuring chibli renditions of the eight main characters. Lolita fashion brand Putumayo, who had previous collaborated on promotional clothing for Tales of Symphonia, designed clothing and jewellery based on the eight main characters. Figurines of Sorey and Alisha were also produced. After release, the game received two guides: a Complete Guide, published by Bandai Namco Entertainment in February 2015, and a Perfect Guide containing a full breakdown of the game and behind-the-scenes content, published by Enterbrain in April of the same year.

The game's planned year of release in Japan was revealed at a Tales Of Festival in June 2014, while its exact release date and period of release in the west at that year's Tokyo Game Show. As part of the localization process for the game, Bandai Namco announced it was working to release the game across all major regions within the same year, with the localization starting after the game had released in Japan. The motivation behind this was fan reaction to the delayed release of the Xillia games. For the English release, the team actively considered including the Japanese vocal track as in Tales of Symphonia Chronicles. Dual audio was confirmed with the announcement of the game's western release window. Despite the high popularity of the PlayStation 4 (PS4) in the west, no initial plans were made for a port to that console due to a shortage of manpower. Later, due to the high adoption rate of the PS4 in western territories, and the popularity of PC games, ports of Zestiria to those platforms were created exclusively for western markets. Collector's Editions were created for Europe and North America: the collections feature DLC codes, chibi figures of four of the game's characters, an art book, and special cases for the game disc. In North America, the collection was exclusive to the PS4. In the European Steam version, a code for the Steam port of Tales of Symphonia was included. The PS4 version was later released in Japan on 7 July 2016 as a "Welcome Price!!" budget edition.

=== Downloadable content ===
Multiple pre-order bonuses in the form of DLC were created to promote the game. The standard bonuses were four new Mystic Artes for Lailah, Mikleo, and Alisha, plus limited rubber straps portraying the playable characters. A further offer for those who pre-ordered the game through 7-Eleven stores included special character costumes and a powerful healing ability for Sorey. Along with the pre-order DLC, Bandai Namco also created crossover character costumes based on the Rebuild of Evangelion film series for selected characters, and four playable characters from the raising simulation video game The Idolmaster One For All. They also created original Academy Costumes for the eight main characters. For the Idolmaster DLC costumes, the battle music changed to match the characters' appearances. There were further collaborative efforts with costumes based on characters from the manga Blue Exorcist, and attachments inspired by characters from Capcom's Sengoku Basara 4. In addition to these, there are also swimsuit costumes and outfits based on protagonists from previous Tales titles.

Japanese players who kept save data from the Xillia games, and the PlayStation 3 ports of Vesperia and Graces, unlocked attachments themed after the main protagonists of those games. After release, further DLC in the form of further costumes, cosmetic accessories, and free skits. Delivery of these and other DLC ended in March 2015. A downloadable scenario titled Alisha's Story: The Strength of a Knight (Note: アリーシャ アフターエピソード －瞳にうつるもの－, Arīsha Afutā Episōdo -Hitomi ni Utsuru Mono-; lit. Alisha After Episode: What is Reflected in the Eyes), featuring Alisha and Rose in a post-endgame scenario, was released on 12 February 2015 in Japan and alongside the game in the West. The scenario can be played without needing to complete the main game, with the playable characters' stats carried over from the main game. To celebrate the series anniversary and the game's initial sales, the company made the scenario free until 26 February. Alisha's Story and much of the original pre-order DLC was included in the European and North American Collector's Editions. It was also offered free for a limited time to players who purchased the game on Steam.

== Reception ==
=== Reviews ===
Reception

Aggregate scores
Aggregator	Score
Metacritic	PC: 77/100; PS4: 72/100
OpenCritic	43% recommend (Note: Based on 52 reviews)

Review scores
Publication	Score
Famitsu	PS3: 36/40
Game Informer	6.5/10
GameSpot	6/10
GameTrailers	7.4/10
Hardcore Gamer	3/5
IGN	7.8/10
PC Gamer (US)	82/100
RPGamer	3.5/5
RPGFan	80%
Dengeki PlayStation	PS3: 91/100
PlayStation LifeStyle	PS3: 7/10; PS4: 8/10

The game received a positive reception overall. Aggregate site Metacritic gave the PS4 and PC versions of the game scores of 72/100 and 77/100 respectively. The Japanese version also received positive press prior to release: at the 2014 Japan Game Awards after that year's Tokyo Game Show, Zestiria was among the games that won the "Future Division" award. The game also received the Platinum award from Japanese gaming magazine Famitsu upon release.

The story and characters were praised by Famitsu and fellow gaming magazine Dengeki PlayStation: Famitsu called the former "epic" and the latter "charming". Dengeki generally referred to Zestiria as the Tales series' "finest masterpiece". Erren Van Duine, writing for gaming website PlayStation Lifestyle, called the characters "likable" and praised the first half of the story, but felt that the narrative "fell flat" during the second half. In a different review for the same site, Jowi Meli found the experience enjoyable despite a slow start and awkward English voice work. Opinion on the characters was generally divided in western reviews: while Danielle Lucas of PC Gamer, RPGamer's Adriaan den Ouden, RPGFan's Alana Hagues and Ben Moore of GameTrailers enjoyed the characters, other reviewers such as Hardcore Gamer's Jordan Helm, IGN's Meghan Sullivan, and GameSpot's Miguel Concepcion were generally less impressed, with Concepcion in particular drawing comparisons between multiple other games within the genre and saying that the cast came across as unoriginal. The story received mixed opinions from reviewers, with some enjoying it and others noting a lack of originality as its primary fault. In particular, Kimberley Wallace of Game Informer found it less innovative than previous titles despite a more mature approach and less clichéd dialogue.

Famitsu positively noted a noticeable "evolution" in the interaction between battles and navigation, described the battles as exciting and found the Armitization feature worked smoothly. The main point of criticism was the environmental interaction, which grew tiresome once the player grew used to all the skills. Van Duine said that, while not perfect, the battle transition "[provided] a greater sense of environment rather than shifting to an instanced zone", while Dengeki PlayStation positively noted smooth gameplay, "seamless" transition from navigation to battle, and the ability to retry battles after being defeated. Wallace was pleased with the battle system and praised Armitization despite a general slow pace, while Remi found the gameplay deeper than in previous titles and echoed Wallace's praise for the battle system. This praise and similar notes surrounding Armitization were shared by multiple other western reviewers, although a few minor criticisms arose concerning old-fashioned gameplay mechanics, and item and equipment management. A common issue raised by reviewers was the camera behavior both in battle and when navigating environments, which was generally described as wayward or distracting.

Some other issues were raised, with Famitsu citing obscure tutorials as one of the game's weak points. Van Duine, while praising the art style, noted multiple dips in frame rate, showing that the hardware was having trouble coping with the game. Both Boone and Wallace noted a lack of hints for players, which resulted in bouts of aimless wandering. Wallace also critiqued archaic elements within the game, and faulted the artificial intelligence for other characters in battle. The game's graphics also came in for criticism, with Remi in particular comparing it to titles for the PlayStation 2. Multiple reviewers also noted rough patches when traversing the open world, with a few commenting that it was made harder when the teleport system was disabled at certain points in the story.

=== Sales ===
According to Media Create, Zestiria topped the Japanese sales charts upon release, selling 340,891 units, beating The Legend of Legacy for the Nintendo 3DS and Kirby and the Rainbow Curse for Wii U. A week after release, Bandai Namco announced that the game had shipped over 400,000 units. It was the fifth best-selling game during the period between its release and August 2015. Upon release in the United Kingdom, Zestiria reached #8 in the top twenty game titles in its week of release, becoming the highest-ranking new release. As of 2021, Zestiria ranks as the fourth best-selling Tales title worldwide, indicating sales of over one million units. It has recorded sales of 600,000 units in North America, and 481,000 in Europe where it was the best-selling Tales title released in the region.

=== Controversy ===
There was negative player feedback after release concerning the handling of playable characters, in particular that Alisha was not playable through most of the game despite her prominent presence in early promotional material. It was further inflamed by the announcement of Alisha After Episode, with many players saying that Alisha's absence from the second half of the main game was an excuse to monetize the character. During an appearance at the Taipei Game Show, Baba said that the appearance of characters in promotional material reflected their order of appearance in the game rather than their importance or prominence in the game. He also stated that the story did not have a specific heroine, leaving players the freedom to choose one for themselves. Later, Baba elaborated to Famitsu that the material sent to publications did not specifically refer to Alisha as the game's heroine, although the development team for mobile spin-off Tales of Asteria included information describing Alisha as Zestiria's heroine, much to Baba's regret. He further stated that Alisha's story role is important despite her early departure, and that the ability for Rose to wear Alisha's DLC costumes was kept quiet to avoid spoiling the story. Bandai Namco kept this situation in mind while considering whether to release Alisha After Episode with the main game or as a standalone product in the west.

== Media adaptations ==
=== Animation ===
A made-for-television anime film titled Tales of Zestiria: Dawn of the Shepherd (Note: テイルズ オブ ゼスティリア ～導師の夜明け～, Teiruzu Obu Zesutiria: ～Dōshi no Yoake～) was produced to promote the game. It was animated by Ufotable, and distributed by Bandai Namco Games. The anime depicts the opening part of the game, where Sorey trains to become a Shepherd and first encounters Alisha and Lunarre. The anime was directed by Haruo Sotozaki, produced by Baba, and scored by Sakuraba and Shiina. Given the costs associated with including the anime with the game on a Blu-ray hybrid disc, the company was originally opposed to its creation and originally planned for a Tales of Berseria anime adaption. Despite this, Baba wanted to create the anime as part of the 20th anniversary series celebrations related to the game. It was first broadcast on 30 December 2014 on Tokyo MX and Kyoto Broadcasting System (KBS), and on 31 December on BS11. It was subsequently broadcast through January on Kochi TV, Okayama Broadcasting, Ehime Asahi Television and Bandai Channel. It was repeated again on 20 January to commemorate the release of the game. In Japan, the anime is included on the game's disc. For its western release, the anime was included in the European and North American Collector's Editions.

An animated television series adaptation, titled Tales of Zestiria the X, (Note: テイルズ オブ ゼスティリア ザ クロス, Teiruzu Obu Zesutiria Za Kurosu; pronounced "Tales of Zestiria the Cross") also animated by Ufotable, was announced at the Tales of Festival 2015. The original plans for the anime was about Tales of Berseria and its promotion before its release, hence the reason why the game makes an adapted appearance. The series is directed by Haruo Sotozaki and written by Ufotable staff. Akira Matsushima is adapting the original character designs for the anime, while the art director is Minji Kim. The music is composed by Motoi Sakuraba and Go Shiina. The anime's opening theme song, "Kaze no Uta", is performed by Flow, while the ending theme, "Calling", is performed by Fhána. The main voice actors from the game will reprise their roles in the series except for Lailah's voice actress Miyu Matsuki, who died in 2015 and was replaced by Noriko Shitaya. The series was originally announced for broadcast sometime in July 2016. The anime has been licensed by Funimation and by Madman Entertainment for streaming. The first half of the anime television series adaptation aired from 3 July 2016 to 25 September 2016. The second half aired from 8 January 2017 to 29 April 2017. The anime shares certain scenes and plot points with the game and, at times, also deviates from the game.

=== Print ===
A manga adaptation written and illustrated by Shiramine, titled Tales of Zestiria: The Time of Guidance (Note: テイルズ オブ ゼスティリア: 導きの刻, Teiruzu Obu Zesutiria: Michibiki no Koku), began serialization in Japan on 28 January 2015 in Monthly Comic Zero Sum. An official novelization of the opening part of the game, written by Sawako Hirabayashi, was released on 30 April 2015. Seven Seas Entertainment have licensed the manga for a North American release.
