= Legend (Legend Seven album) =

Studio album by Legend
- Released: 1992
- Genre: Christian rock, rock
- Length: ??:??
- Label: Word Records

Legend chronology
Legend (1992)	Legend Seven (1993)

Legend is the debut album of the Christian rock band of the same name. After this recording, the band changed the name to Legend Seven when they became aware of another band with the same name. It was released in 1992 under the Word Records label.

== Track listing ==
1. "Friendly Fire"
2. "Don't Believe It"
3. "Angela"
4. "After The Fall"
5. "Carry Me"
6. "Set This Place On Fire"
7. "Colours"
8. "They That Wait"
9. "Lead Me Back"
10. "Always And Forever"

== Personnel ==
- Andy Denton
- Mike Jacobs
- Randy Ray
- Billy Williams
