= American Legend Cooperative =

Agricultural marketing coop for mink fur

The American Legend Cooperative (ALC) was an agricultural marketing cooperative of mink fur farmers in the United States and Canada, best known for its Blackglama, American Legend, and older LEGEND brands of fur. American Legend was formed in 1986 as a merger of the Great Lakes Mink Association (GLMA) and the Mutation Mink Breeders Association (EMBA). It was acquired by North American Fur Auctions in 2018.

The Great Lakes Mink Association (GLMA) was formed in 1941 by mink breeders in the Great Lakes region of the United States who bred a black-furred mink which they characterize as "the richest, deepest, most lustrous dark mink with the lightest, most flexible leather", and trademarked it as Blackglama. Their long-running advertising campaign is known by the tagline "What becomes a legend most?", featuring a series of celebrities modeling their furs. The name "Blackglama" is a play on the word "glamor" and the initialism "GLMA".

The Mutation Mink Breeders Association (MMBA) was formed in 1942 by mink ranchers specializing in clear bright fur colors, to which they gave distinctive trade names: Autumn Haze (brown), Desert Gold (light brown), Argenta (grey), Cerulean (blue), Lutetia (gunmetal), Azurene (pale grey), Jasmine (white), Tourmaline (pale beige), Arcturus (lavender beige), Diadem (pale brown), Aeolian (grey taupe). In 1948, they adopted the name EMBA; EMBA used the trademark "The American Mink".

In April 2018, North American Fur Auctions acquired the American Legend Cooperative and its Blackglama brand.

== Membership ==
Membership in the American Legend Cooperative was open to active mink farmers in the United States or Canada who had sold over 1200 mink pelts at American Legend auctions within the previous year and who were approved by the cooperative's Board of Directors.

== 'Blackglama - What Becomes a Legend Most' Spokesmodels ==
- 1968: Lauren Bacall, Bette Davis, Judy Garland, Melina Mercouri, Barbra Streisand
- 1969: Joan Crawford, Marlene Dietrich, Lena Horne
- 1970: Brigitte Bardot, Maria Callas, Rita Hayworth, Leontyne Price, Barbara Stanwyck, Rosalind Russell
- 1971: Claudette Colbert, Paulette Goddard, Ruby Keeler
- 1972: Pearl Bailey, Carol Burnett, Carol Channing, Ethel Merman
- 1973: Peggy Lee, Liza Minnelli, Diana Ross
- 1975: Mary Martin, Beverly Sills, Raquel Welch
- 1976: Martha Graham, Margot Fonteyn, Lillian Hellman, Rudolf Nureyev
- 1977: Shirley MacLaine, Suzy Knickerbocker, Liv Ullmann, Diana Vreeland
- 1978: Faye Dunaway, Joan Fontaine (later reprinted as the cover of her autobiography 'No Bed of Roses'), Helen Hayes
- 1979: Lillian Gish, Angela Lansbury, Renata Scotto
- 1980: Myrna Loy, Ann Miller, Maggie Smith, Lana Turner
- 1981: Luciano Pavarotti, Gloria Swanson, Natalie Wood
- 1982: Julie Andrews, Sophia Loren
- 1983: Elizabeth Taylor
- 1984: Lucille Ball, Dinah Shore
- 1985: Ann-Margret
- 1986: Cher
- 1987: Audrey Hepburn
- 1988: Catherine Deneuve
- 1990: Ray Charles
- 1991: Jessica Tandy
- 1992: Jessye Norman
- 1993: Debbie Reynolds
- 1994: Tommy Tune
- 2001: Linda Evangelista
- 2002: Gisele Bündchen
- 2004: Cindy Crawford
- 2005: Elle Macpherson
- 2007: Naomi Campbell
- 2008: Elizabeth Hurley
- 2010, 2011: Janet Jackson
- 2012: Ginta Lapina
- 2013: Carolyn Murphy
- 2014: Hilary Rhoda
- 2015: Jessica Stam
- 2017: Daphne Groeneveld

== Communications ==
ALC is a founding member of the North American Fur Industry Communications group (NAFIC), established in 2013 as a cooperative public educational program for the fur industry in Canada and the USA. Its slogan is "Truth About Fur".
