= James Bourque =

Canadian politician

James W. Bourque, PC (December 17, 1935 – October 19, 1996) was a First Nations activist, who in 1992 became one of the few Canadians ever appointed to the Queen's Privy Council for Canada who had not previously served in an elected political office.

Born in Wandering River, Alberta, Bourque was of Cree and Métis background. At the age of 18 he was elected president of the hunters and trappers association in Fort Chipewyan before working as a park warden in Wood Buffalo National Park from 1955 to 1963.

He served as president of the Métis Association of the Northwest Territories from 1980 to 1982, was deputy minister of renewable resources for the government of the Northwest Territories from 1982 to 1991 and chairman of the Northwest Territories' Commission for Constitutional Development.

Bourque was also the founder of the Centre for Traditional Knowledge.

In 1984 he founded the Fur Institute of Canada, serving as its chairman for four years. He was named co-director of policy for the Royal Commission on Aboriginal People in 1994. On July 1, 1992 he was sworn into the Queen's Privy Council.
