= Fur clothing =

Clothing made of furry animal hides

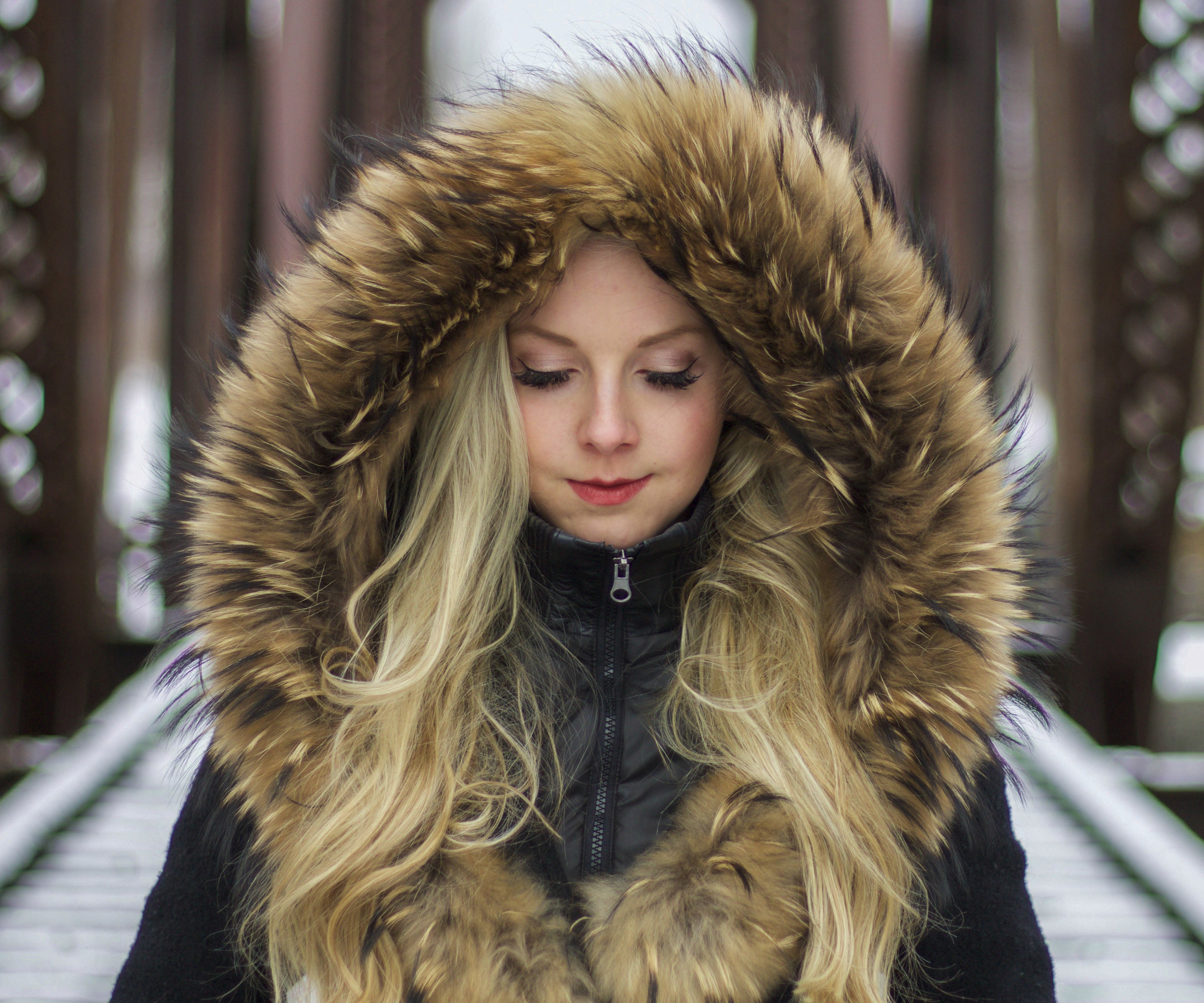
Hood with Asiatic raccoon trimming

Fur clothing is clothing made from the preserved skins of mammals. Fur is one of the oldest forms of clothing and is thought to have been widely used by people for at least 120,000 years. The term 'fur' is often used to refer to a specific item of clothing such as a coat, wrap, or shawl made from the fur of animals.

Humans wear fur garments to protect them from cold climates and wind chill, but documented evidence of fur as a marker of social status exists as far back as 2,000 years ago with ancient Egyptian royalty and high priests wearing the skins of leopards.

Historically in European and Middle Eastern cultures fur garments often had the fur facing inwards with cloth on the exterior of the jacket, but in the 19th century wearing seal fur coats with the fur facing outwards became the trend. Worldwide, both styles are popular, with fur linings offering more thermal benefits and exterior furs serving more of a fashionable purpose.

== History ==
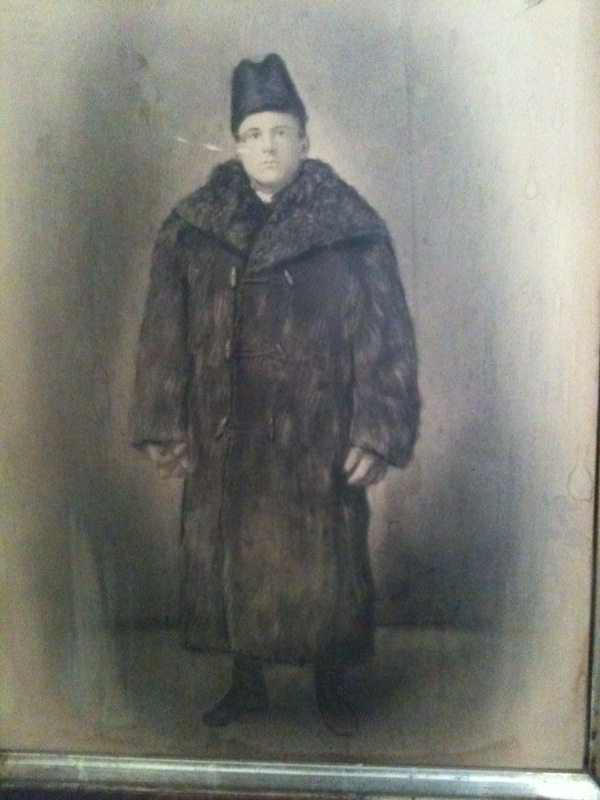
A French-Canadian man, wearing a fur coat and hat, around 1910

Fur is generally thought to have been among the first materials used for clothing. The period when fur was first used as clothing is debated. It is known that several species of hominoids including Homo sapiens and Homo neanderthalensis used fur clothing. Clothing was made from the hides of animals such as bison, muskox, bear, ground sloth, woolly rhinoceros, mammoth or Irish elk.

Fur clothing predates written history and has been recovered from various archaeological sites worldwide.

Crown proclamations known as "sumptuary legislation" were issued in England limiting the wearing of certain furs to higher social statuses, thereby establishing a cachet based on exclusivity. Furs such as leopard, snow leopard and cheetah (all three of them known as 'panther' at the time), red squirrel, marten, and ermine were reserved for the aristocracy, while fox, hare and beaver clothed the middle, and goat, wolf and sheepskin the lower. Fur was primarily used for visible linings, with species varied by season within social classes. Populations of fur-bearing animals decreased in West Europe and began to be imported from the Middle East and Russia.

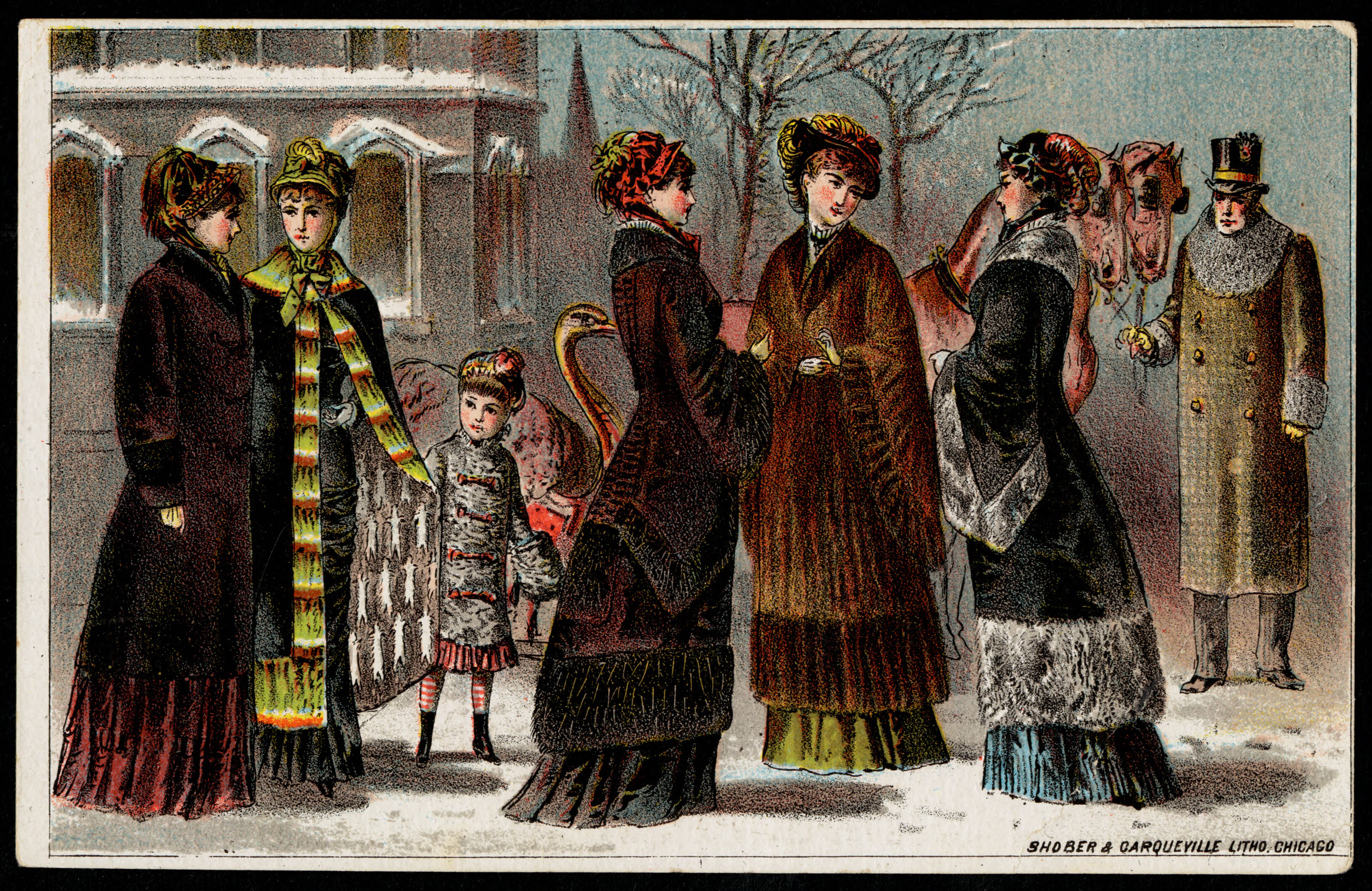
M. J. F. Periolat & Co. leading furriers of the northwest. Furs of every description at reasonable prices, ca. 1870-1900; from the 19th Century American Trade Cards collection of the Boston Public Library

As new kinds of fur, such as jaguar and chinchilla, entered Europe, other uses were found for fur other than clothing. Beaver was most desired and used to make hats which became popular headpieces, especially during wartime. Swedish soldiers wore broad-brimmed hats made exclusively from beaver felt. Due to the limitations of beaver fur, hat-makers relied heavily on North America for imports as beaver was only available in the Scandinavian peninsula.

Other than the military, fur has been used for accessories such as hats, hoods, scarves, and muffs. Design elements including the visuals of the animal were considered acceptable with heads, tails and paws still being kept on the accessories. During the nineteenth century, Seal and karakul were made into indoor jackets.

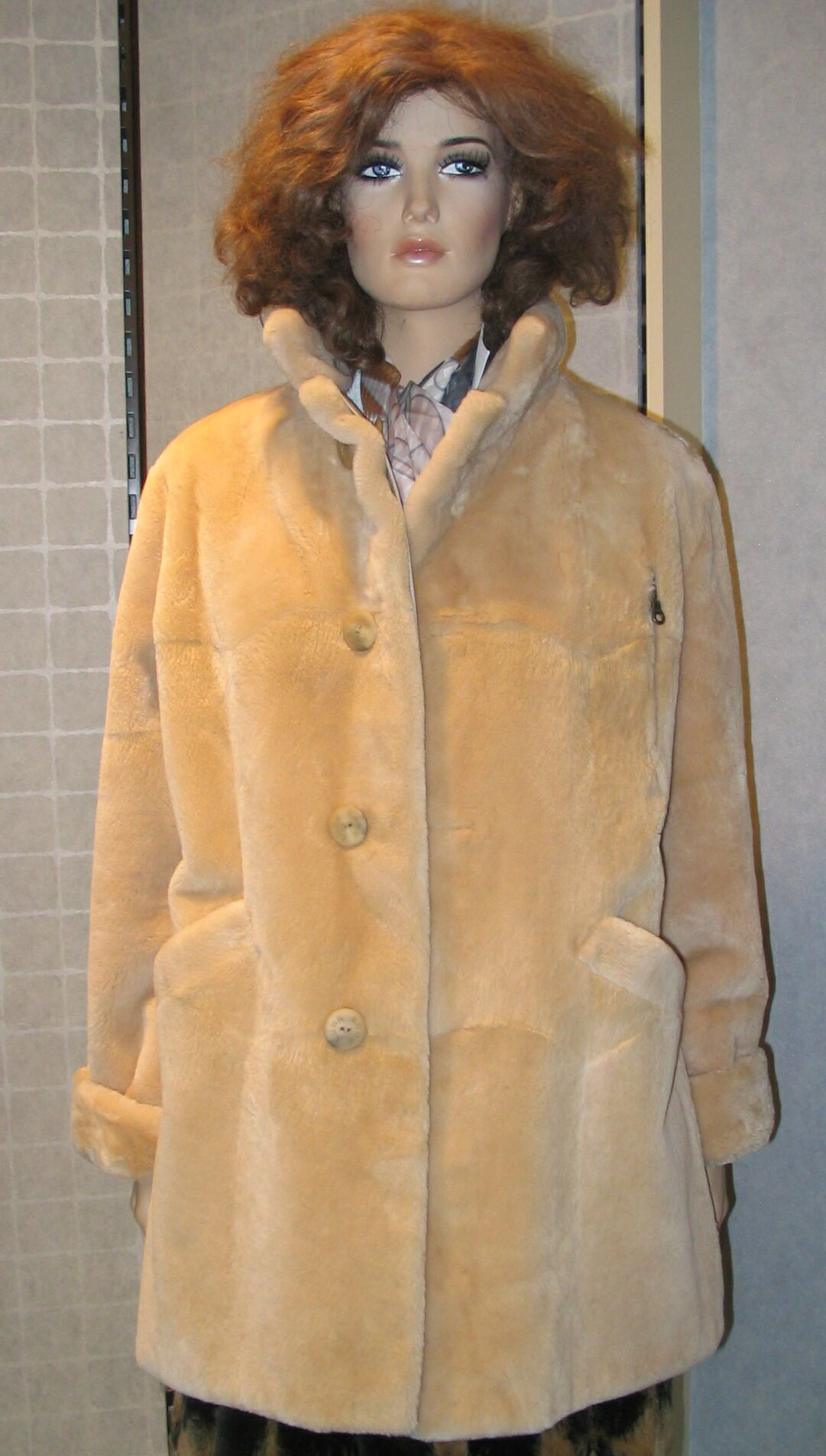
Coypu jacket, reversible

The twentieth century saw fur being fashionable in West Europe with full fur coats. With lifestyle changes as a result of developments like indoor heating, the international textile trade affected how fur was distributed around the world. Europeans focused on using local resources giving fur association with femininity with the increasing use of mink.

The most popular kinds of fur in the 1960s (known as luxury fur) were blond mink, white rabbit, yellow leopard, jaguar or cheetah, black panther, silver striped fox and red fox. Cheaper alternatives were pelts of wolf, Persian lamb or muskrat. It was common for ladies to wear a matching hat. In the 1950s, a must-have type of fur was the mutation fur (naturally nuanced colours) and fur trimmings on a coat that were beaver, lamb fur, Astrakhan and mink.

In 1970, Germany was the world's largest fur market. In 1975, the International Fur Trade Federation banned endangered species furs like silk monkey, silky sifaka, ringtailed lemur, golden bamboo lemur, sportive lemur, dwarf lemur, ocelot, margay, cougar, snow leopard, black panther, leopard, jaguar, tiger, cheetah, quoll, numbat, chinchilla, black bear, Sun bear, Moon bear, and polar bear. The use of animal skins was brought to light during the 1980s by animal rights organizations while the demand for fur decreased. Anti-fur organizations raised awareness of animal welfare issues within the fashion industry. Fur farming was banned in Britain in 1999. During the twenty-first century, foxes and mink have been bred in captivity with Denmark, the Netherlands and Finland being leaders in mink production. Fur farming has since been banned in the Netherlands.

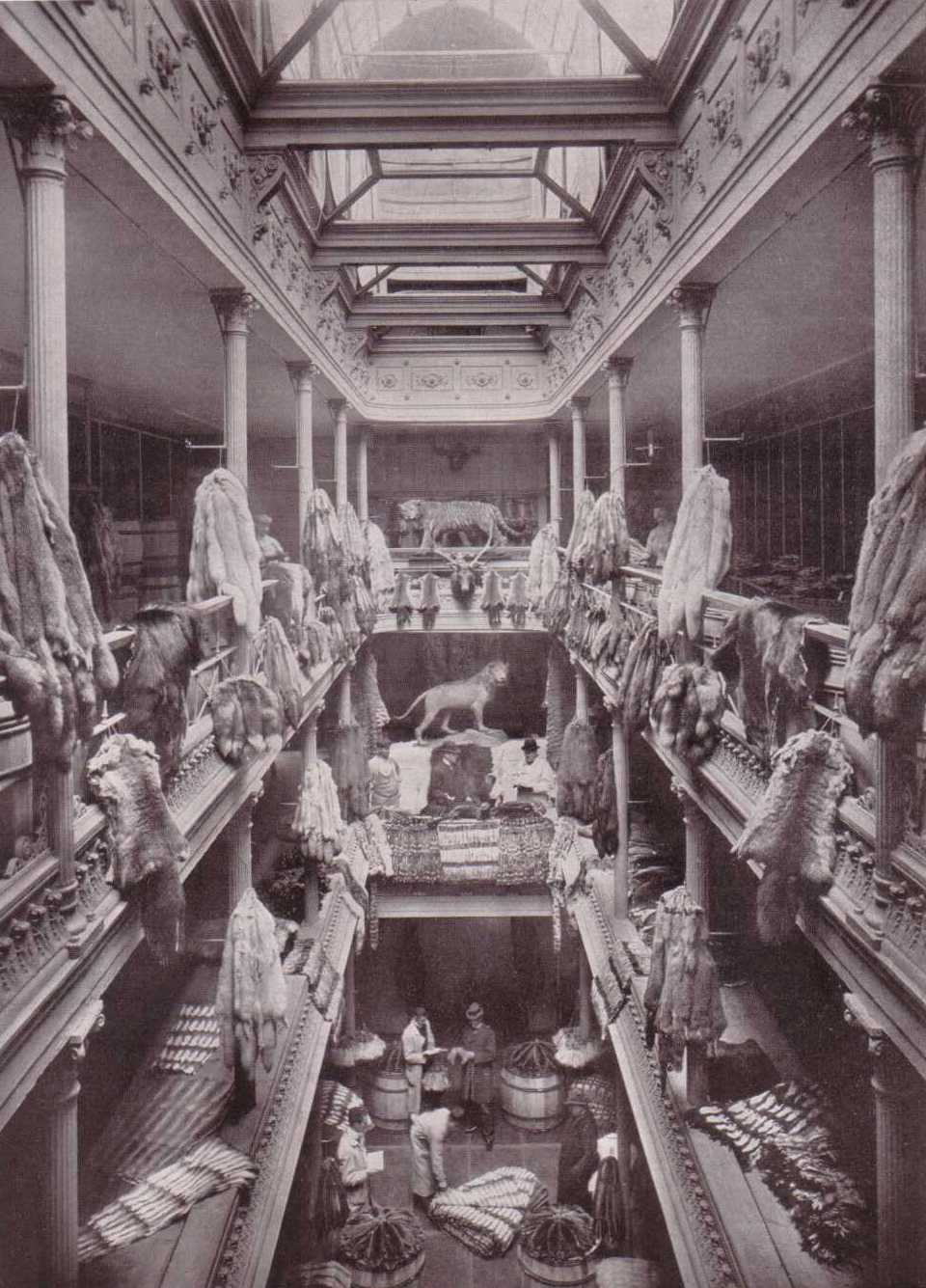
Wholesale dealer (Leipzig, c. 1900)

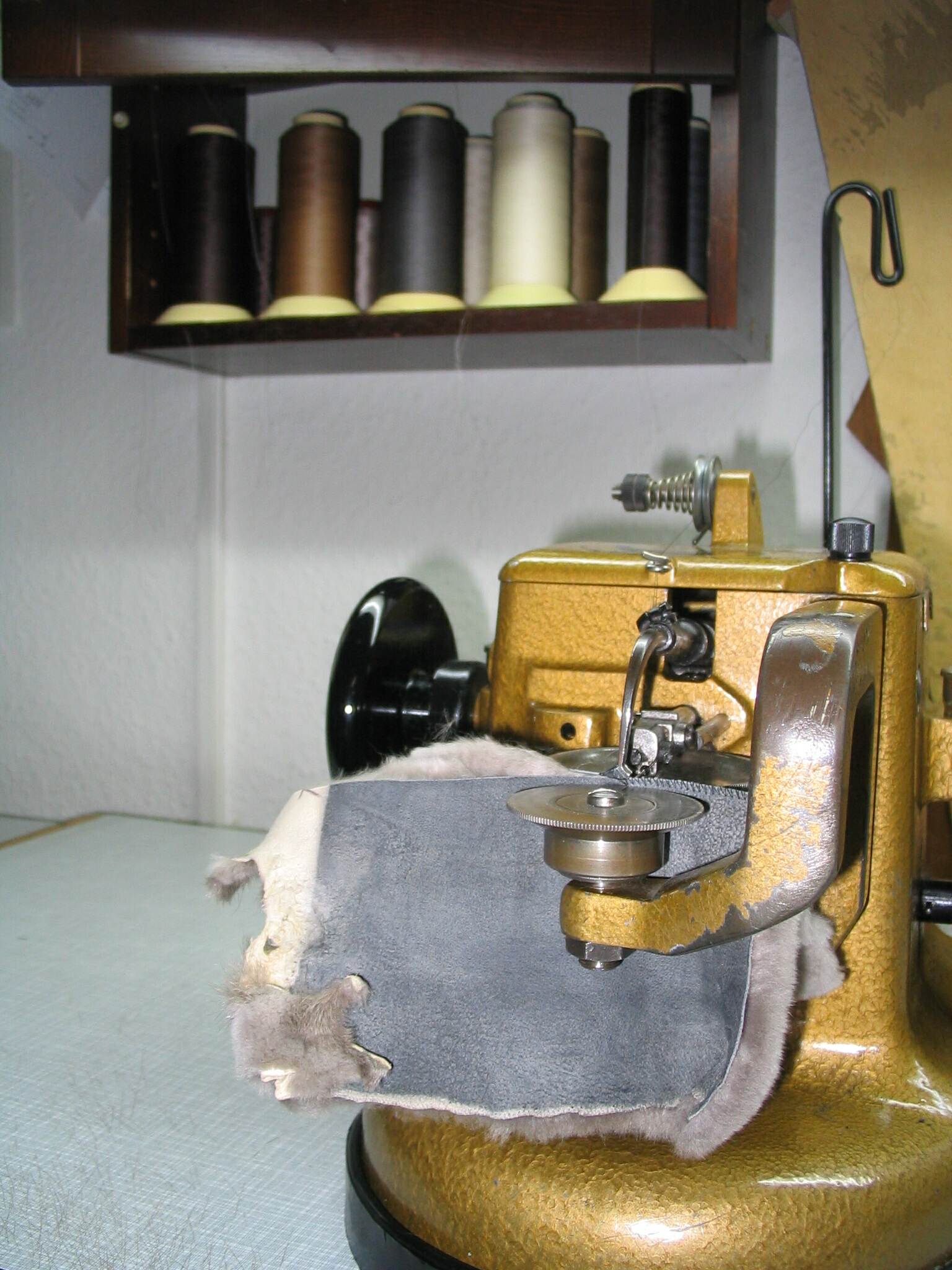
Fur sewing machine Success from Allbook & Hashfield, Nottingham, England

Fur is still worn in cooler climates around the world due to its warmth and durability. From the days of early European settlement, up until the development of modern clothing alternatives, fur clothing was popular in Canada during the cold winters. The invention of inexpensive synthetic textiles for insulating clothing led to fur clothing falling out of fashion.

Fur is still used by indigenous people and industrialized societies, due to its availability and superior insulation properties. The Inuit peoples of the Arctic relied on fur for most of their clothing, and it also forms a part of traditional clothing in Russia, Ukraine, the former Yugoslavia, Scandinavia, and Japan.

A number of consumers and designers—notably British fashion designer and outspoken animal rights activist Stella McCartney—reject fur due to moral beliefs against cruelty to animals.

Animal furs used in garments and trim may be dyed bright colors or with patterns, often to mimic exotic animal pelts: alternatively, they may be left their original pattern and color. Fur may be shorn down to imitate the feel of velvet, creating a fabric called shearling.

The introduction of alternatives in the early 20th century brought tension to the clothing industry as the faux fur manufacturers started producing faux fur and capitalising on profits. By the 1950s synthetic fur garments had become popular and affordable. Newspapers were writing articles on major chemical companies trying to outdo each other in the quest to create the most realistic fake fur.

The popularity of natural fur has declined in recent years. While Vogue Paris published a homage to fur in August 2017, Gucci later endorsed the idea of not using animal fur. Other high-end brands to follow this lead are Stella McCartney, Givenchy, Calvin Klein, Ralph Lauren, Michael Kors, Philosophy di Lorenzo Serafini. Burberry announced its intentions to stop sending models with fur on runways but did not stop selling it in stores. Some companies have attempted to devise sustainable methods of producing leather and fur. Designer Ingar Helgason is developing Bio fur which would grows synthetic pelts the way that Modern Meadow has been able to produce grown leather and Diamond foundry-created lab-grown diamonds. BOF fur debate hosted by Zilberkweit director of the British Fur Association argued that natural fur was more sustainable. Others said that chemical processes needed to treat animals' fur in order to be worn are just as detrimental to the environment.

Fashion houses such as Hermès, Dior and Fendi still use natural fur. Alex Mcintosh, who leads the Fashion Futures post-graduate program at London College of Fashion, says "change on this level would only be driven on a genuine lack of demand and not just social media outcry".

== Fur sources ==
Common animal sources for fur clothing and fur trimmed accessories include fox, mink, rabbit (specifically the rex rabbit), finnraccoon (industry term for tanuki), lynx, bobcat, polecat (called 'fitch'), muskrat, beaver, stoat (ermine), marten, otter, sable, civet, seals, karakul sheep, muskox, caribou, llama, alpaca, skunk, coyote, wolf, chinchilla, opossum, and common brushtail possum. Some of these are more highly prized than others, and there are many grades and colors. In the past animals such as leopards, jaguars, tigers, lemurs, and Colobus monkeys were commonly used but CITES laws and the environmental regulation has made these furs illegal. Additionally, in some regions the furs of domestic dogs and cats are used for warmth.

Different furs have different properties; coyote fur is resilient and works as a great wind barrier but is very rough to touch, while fox fur is silky but delicate.

The import and sale of seal products was banned in the US in 1972 over conservation concerns about Canadian seals. The import and sale is still banned even though the Marine Animal Response Society estimates the harp seal population is thriving at approximately 8 million, and the bans harmful impact on Indigenous communities that had relied on seal hunting as a source of international income. The import, export and sales of domesticated cat and dog fur were also banned in the US under the Dog and Cat Protection Act of 2000.

Most of the fur sold by high fashion retailers globally is from farmed animals such as mink, foxes, and rabbits. Some cruel methods of killing have made people more aware as animal rights activists work harder to protect the animals. The 2001 recommendations of the European Commission's Scientific Committee on Animal Health and Animal Welfare (SCAHAW) state correspondingly: 'In comparison with other farm animals, species farmed for their fur have been subjected to relatively little active selection except with respect to fur characteristics.

== Processing of fur ==
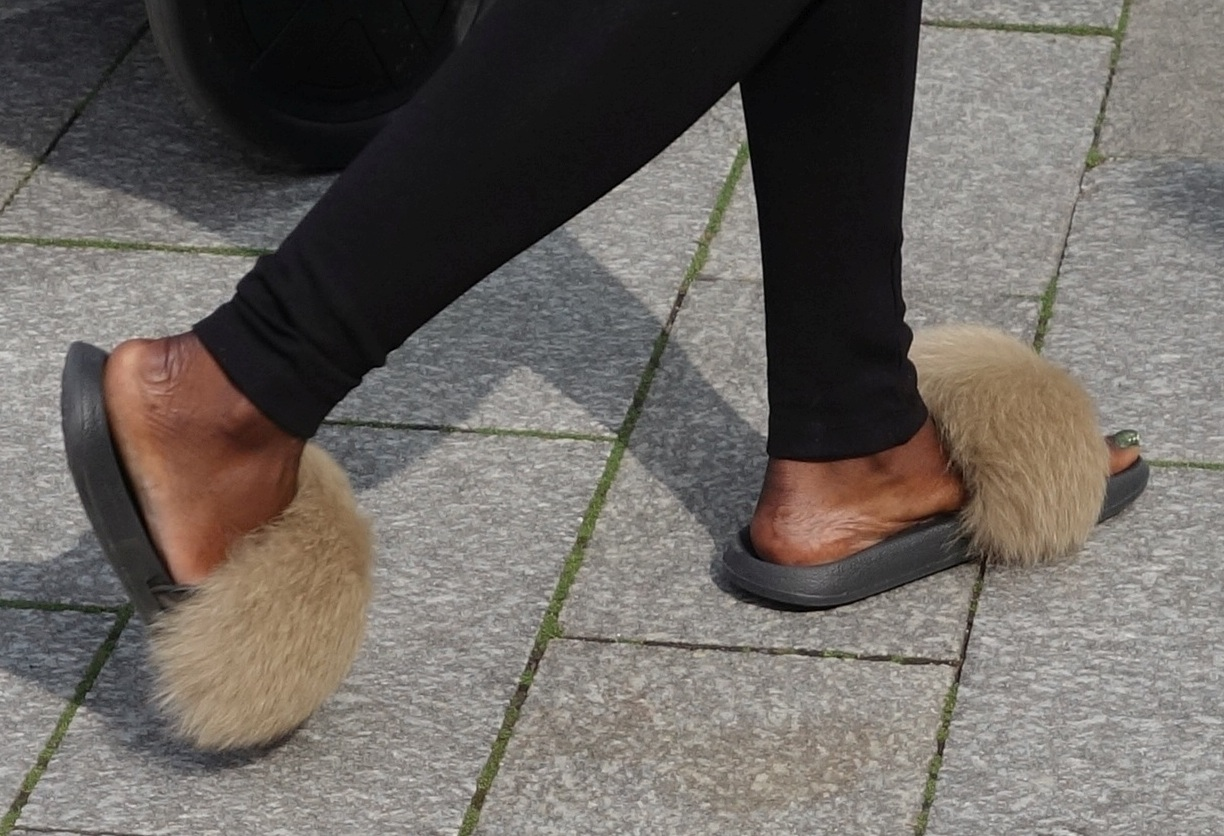
Sandals with dyed fox fur

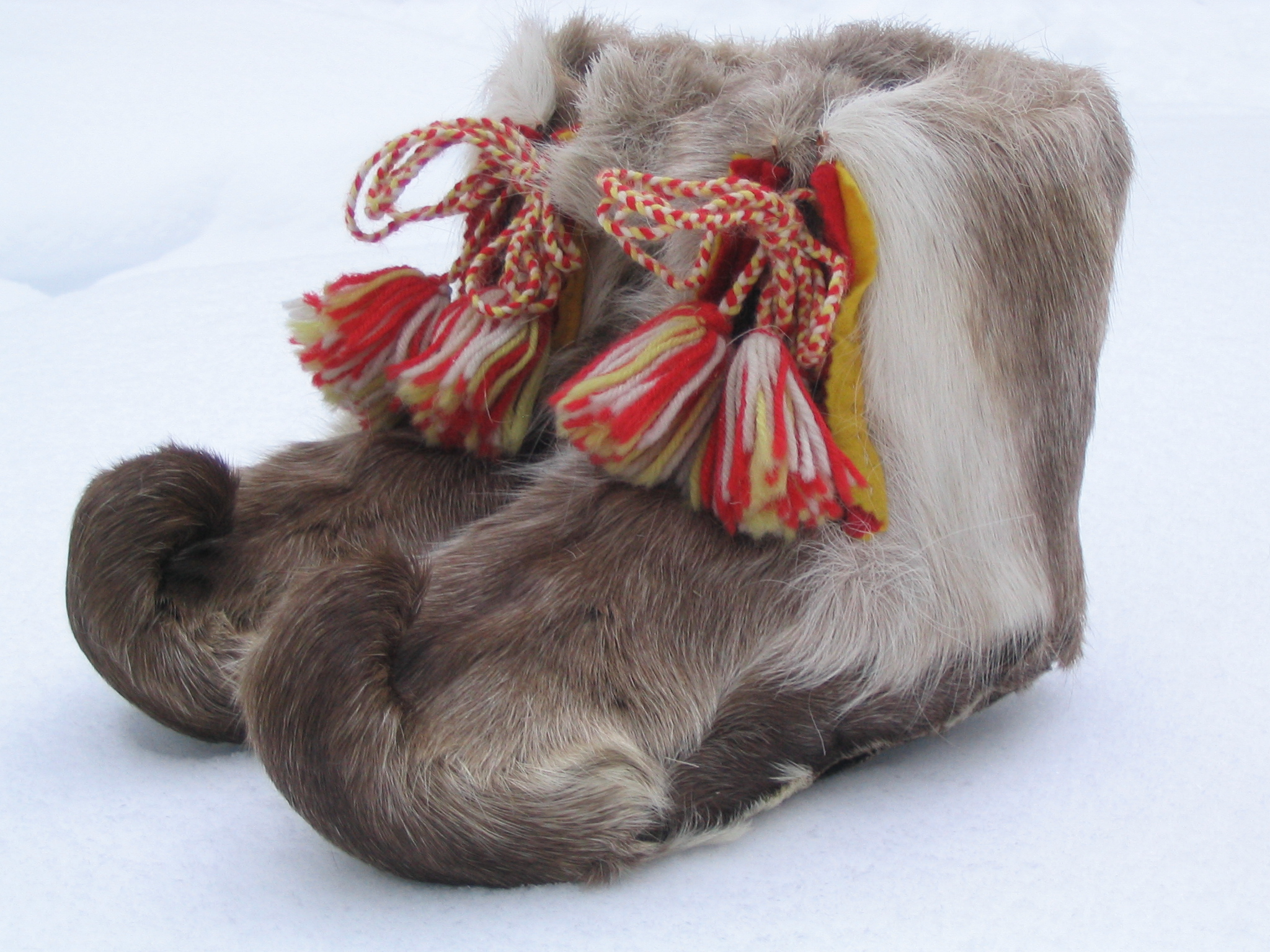
Traditional Sami fur footwear

=== Processing the pelt ===
The manufacturing of fur clothing involves obtaining animal pelts where the hair is left on. Depending on the type of fur and its purpose, some of the chemicals involved in fur processing may include table salts, alum salts, acids, soda ash, sawdust, cornstarch, lanolin, degreasers, and, less commonly, bleaches, dyes and toners (for dyed fur).

The first step in the process is the skinning phase. Animals must be frozen in order to make this phase safe, otherwise, the temperature change from the warm body of the animal to the cold environment around it would cause all the hair to fall off the pelt. It's also best for the carcass to be frozen before skinning so that the carcass won't bleed while being skinned. After the carcass is skinned it's then fleshed, dried, salted, pickled, tanned (either by chemical or by natural method), and then softened. The length of time taken to skin, tan, and process the fur is a contributing factor of the high price.

Workers exposed to fur dust created during fur processing have been shown to have reduced pulmonary function in direct proportion to their length of exposure. The process of fur manufacturing includes waterways-pumping waste and toxic chemicals into the surrounding environment. Dyed furs also do not last as long as natural furs. On the other hand, fur is naturally biodegradable, whereas faux fur is not. Using natural tanning methods such as bark tanning can eliminate the harmful effects of the modern leather and fur tanning industries. Bark tanning involves boiling leaves or bark of trees to extract the tannins that are then used to preserve the hide.

The use of wool involves shearing the animal's fleece from the living animal so that the wool can be regrown but sheepskin shearling is made by retaining the fleece to the leather and shearing it.

=== Garment manufacturing ===
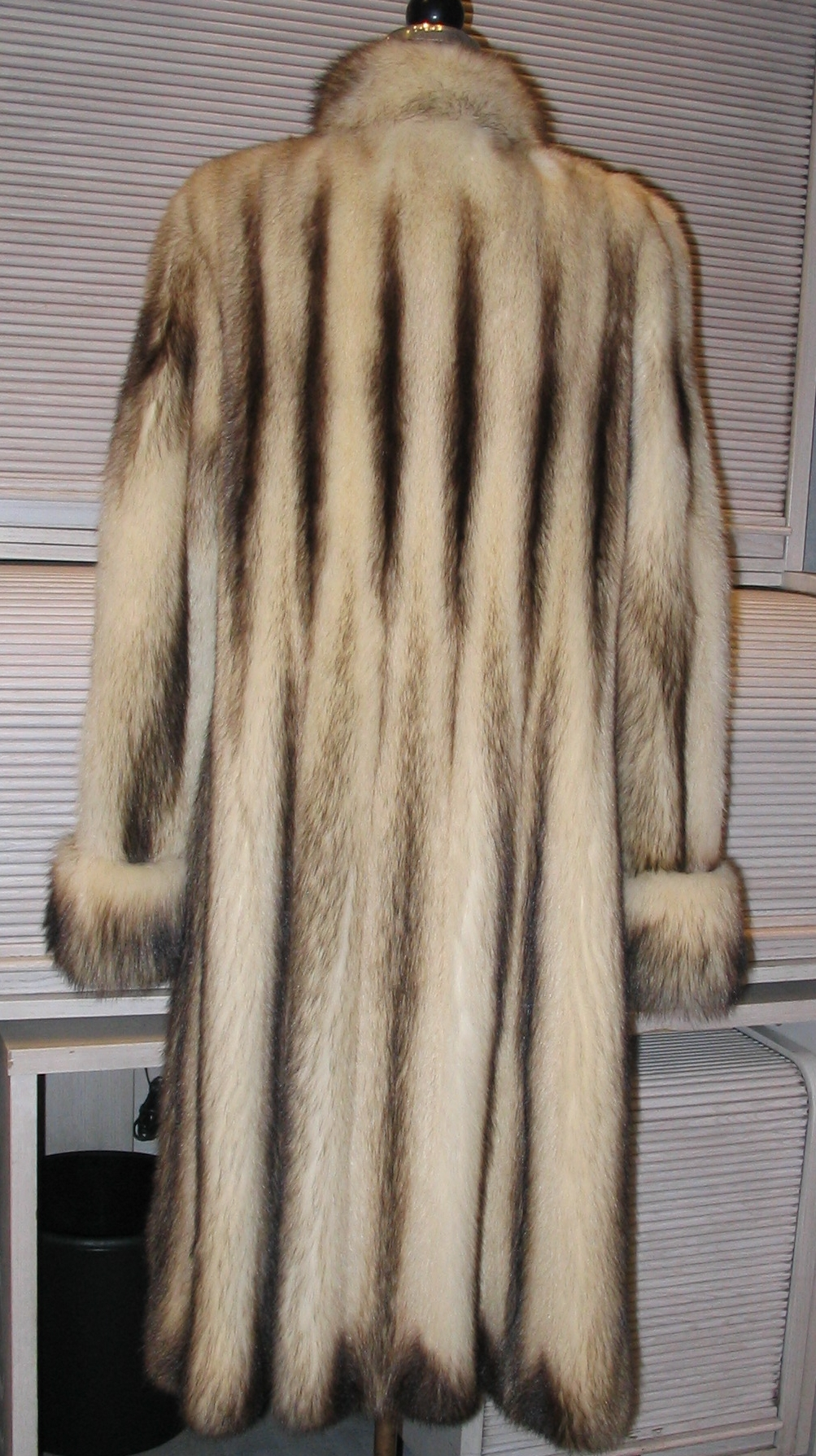
Fitch fur coat worked in the "let-out" method

The foremost reason for the exorbitant price of a fur coat is the amount of time it takes to craft the garment. The first step is the pelt matcher who takes the furs available and matches them based on size and color to create one cohesive garment. Next a craftsperson will repair any damage shown on any of the pelts such as bald spots of torn leather.

Next the pelt is worked in a variety of ways to accentuate the markings of the animals, increase the thermal properties of the pelt, save on cost, or to create new patterns or styles. The let-out method is the most popular method used in the past, this involves cutting the pelt into countless thin strips and sewing them back together in a staggered fashion to make the pelt thinner and longer. The skin-to-skin method, now often called 'full pelt' is the easiest method where whole pelts are sewn side-by-side to fit the pattern. This method is incredibly warm, but looks the least like fabric. The airgallon method involves making small slits in the leather side of the fur making it longer and more lightweight for those who need to save on price. SAGA Furs and Kopenhagen Furs have both been investing in new methods such as knitting with fur (first invented by Indigenous people knitting arctic hare fur into blankets), fur lace, and fur intarsia.

== Anti-fur campaigns ==
Anti-fur campaigns gained popularity in the 1980s and 1990s, with the participation of numerous celebrities and since then fur has been in decline. Fur clothing has become the focus of boycotts due to the opinion that it is cruel and unnecessary. PETA and other animal rights organizations, celebrities, and animal rights ethicists, have called attention to fur farming.

Animal rights advocates object to the trapping and killing of wildlife, and to the confinement and killing of animals on fur farms due to concerns about the animal' suffering and death. They may also condemn "alternatives" made from synthetic (oil-based) clothing as they promote fur for the sake of fashion. Protests also include objections to the use of leather in clothing, shoes and accessories.

Some animal rights activists have disrupted fur fashion shows with protests, while other anti-fur protesters may use fashion shows featuring faux furs or other alternatives to fur clothing as a platform to highlight animal suffering from the use of real leathers and furs. These groups sponsor "Compassionate Fashion Day" on the third Saturday of August to promote their anti-fur message. Some American groups participate in "Fur Free Friday", an event held annually on the Friday after Thanksgiving (Black Friday) that uses displays, protests, and other methods to highlight their beliefs regarding furs.

In Canada, opposition to the annual seal hunt is viewed as an anti-fur issue, although the Humane Society of the United States claims that its opposition is to "the largest slaughter of marine mammals on Earth." IFAW, an anti-sealing group, claims that Canada has an "abysmal record of enforcement" of anti-cruelty laws surrounding the hunt. A Canadian government survey indicated that two-thirds of Canadians supported the hunting of seals if the regulations under Canadian law.

PETA representative Johanna Fuoss credits social media and email marketing campaigns for helping to mobilize an unprecedented number of animal rights activists. "In the year before Michael Kors stopped using fur, he had received more than 150,000 emails," Fuoss tells Highsnobiety. "This puts a certain pressure on designers who can see that the zeitgeist is moving away from fur." New technologies and platforms have made it easier than ever for those advocating change to get results. While in the past, activists had to invade runways with signs and paint, or physically mail privately viewed letters, today's activist can raise a commotion without leaving the house.

The rise of social media has provided the general public with a direct line of communication with companies and a platform for opinions and protests, making it harder for brands to ignore targeted activism. "Brands are under huge pressure to respond to social media and avoid any controversy," says Mark Oaten, chief executive of the IFF. The anti-fur messaging is being amplified by social media and a millennial customer base that is paying closer attention to the values represented by the products they buy.

The feeling of outrage against animal suffering is particularly intense when cats and dogs are involved since these are the most popular pets in Western countries. Therefore, consumers demand to be assured about the production of furs to avoid the risk of inadvertently buying products made with fur from these animals. To counteract the growing concern of consumers, European Union officially banned the import and export from all Member States of dog and cat furs, and all products containing fur from these species, with Regulation 1523/2007, applying since December 31, 2008. A combined method for species identification in furs, based on a combined morphological and molecular approach, has been proposed to discriminate dog and cat furs from allowed fur-bearing species, as this is a necessary step to comply with the ban.

Alternatives to fur have been proposed or invented, including faux biodegradable plant based fur.

== Fur trade ==
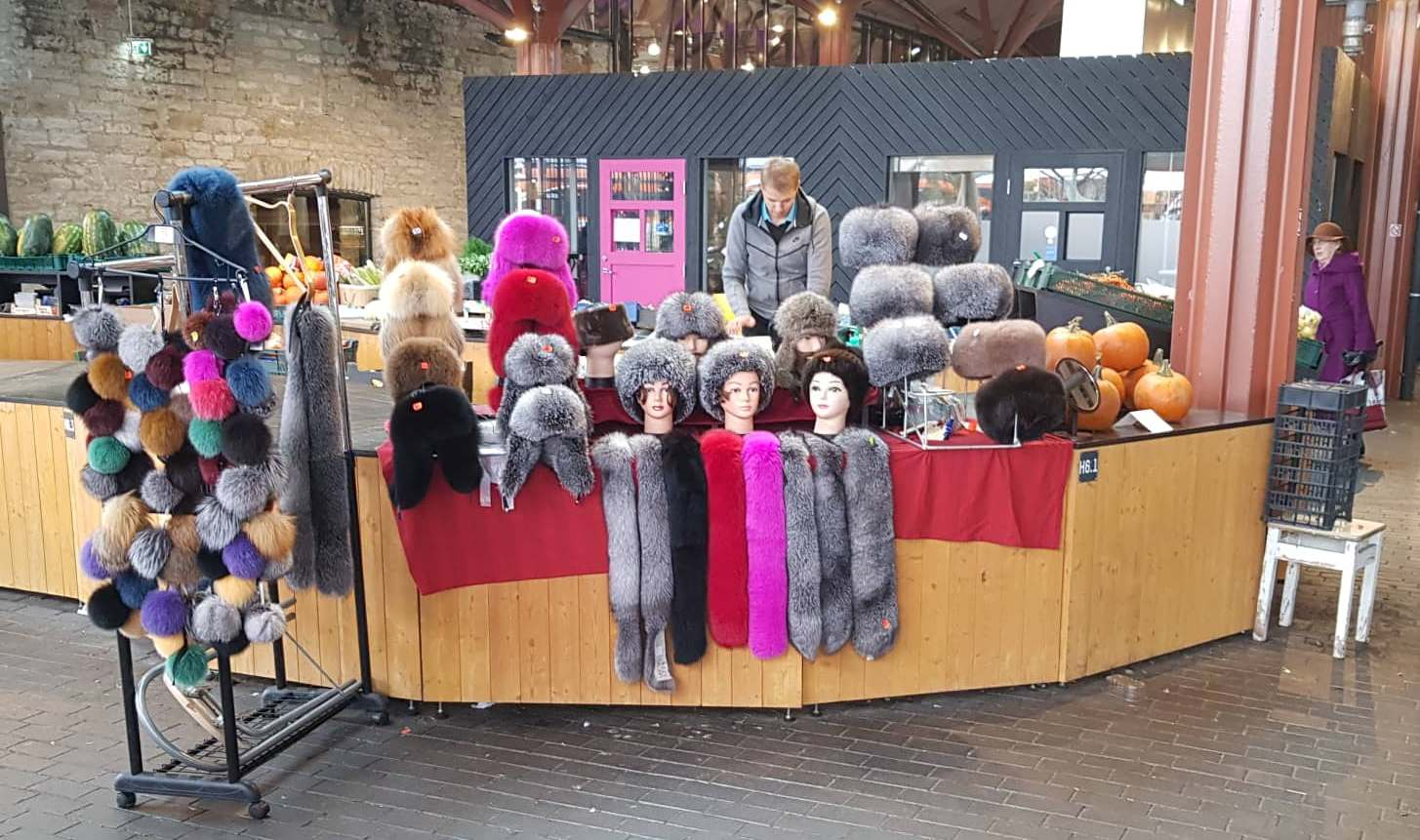
A fur trading in Tallinn, Estonia in 2019

The fur trade is the worldwide buying and selling of fur for clothing and other purposes. The fur trade was one of the driving forces of exploration of North America and the Russian Far East.

The fur trade has long-lasting effects, specifically on the Natives in North America and the populations of fur bearing animals worldwide. When fur farming was first developed in North America it was in response to the dwindling numbers of wild furbearing animals caused by unregulated hunting and trapping.

Currently the most common animals in the global fur trade are farmed animals; mink are the most traded fur worldwide, followed by arctic fox (see Arctic fox fur), red fox, finn raccoon and rabbit.

Following the public awareness of animal welfare abuses in the fur industry, the European Union initiated the WelFur system. WelFur is the agreed upon certification program in the E.U. that prioritizes animal welfare in European fur farms, these farms are then given a QR code through the Furmark system to share with the clothing company which theoretically allows consumers to trace their fur coat back to which farm the animals came from. This system only applies to fur farms in the E.U. that supply fox, mink, and raccoon, and does not apply to farms in China or Russia.

Wild furs are still sold in the fur trade as well such as sable, wild fox, coyote, beaver, lynx, and martens. The Agreement on International Humane Trapping Standards (AIHTS), negotiated between the Russian Federation, the E.U., the U.S. and Canada, is an agreement signed in 1998 to "establish international standards of humane trapping" worldwide.

== Contemporary fashion industries ==
Real fur in fashion is contentious, with Copenhagen (2022) and London (2018) fashion weeks banning real fur in its runway shows following protests and government attention to the issue. Fashion houses such as Gucci and Chanel have banned the use of fur in its garments. Versace and Furla also stopped using fur in their collections in early 2018. In 2020, the luxury outdoor brand Canada Goose announced it would discontinue the use of new coyote fur on parka trims following protests. Luxury brands like Dior, Fendi, Louis Vuitton, Max Mara, and Hermès continue to use fur in their designs.

Governing bodies have issued legislation banning the sale of new real fur garments. In 2021, Israel was the first government to ban the sale of real fur garments, with the exception of those worn as part of a religious faith. In 2019, the state of California banned fur trapping, with a total ban on the sale of all new fur garments except those made of sheep, cow, and rabbit fur going into effect on January 1, 2023.

== See also ==
- Fur farming
- List of fur headgear
