= Fur trade =

Worldwide industry dealing in the acquisition and sale of animal fur

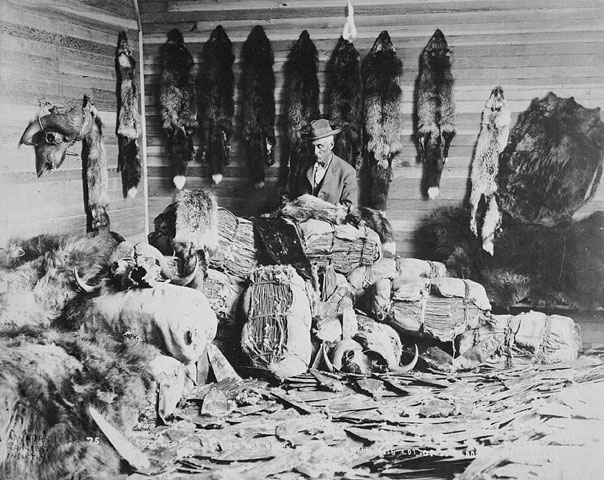
A fur trader in Fort Chipewyan, Northwest Territories, in the 1890s

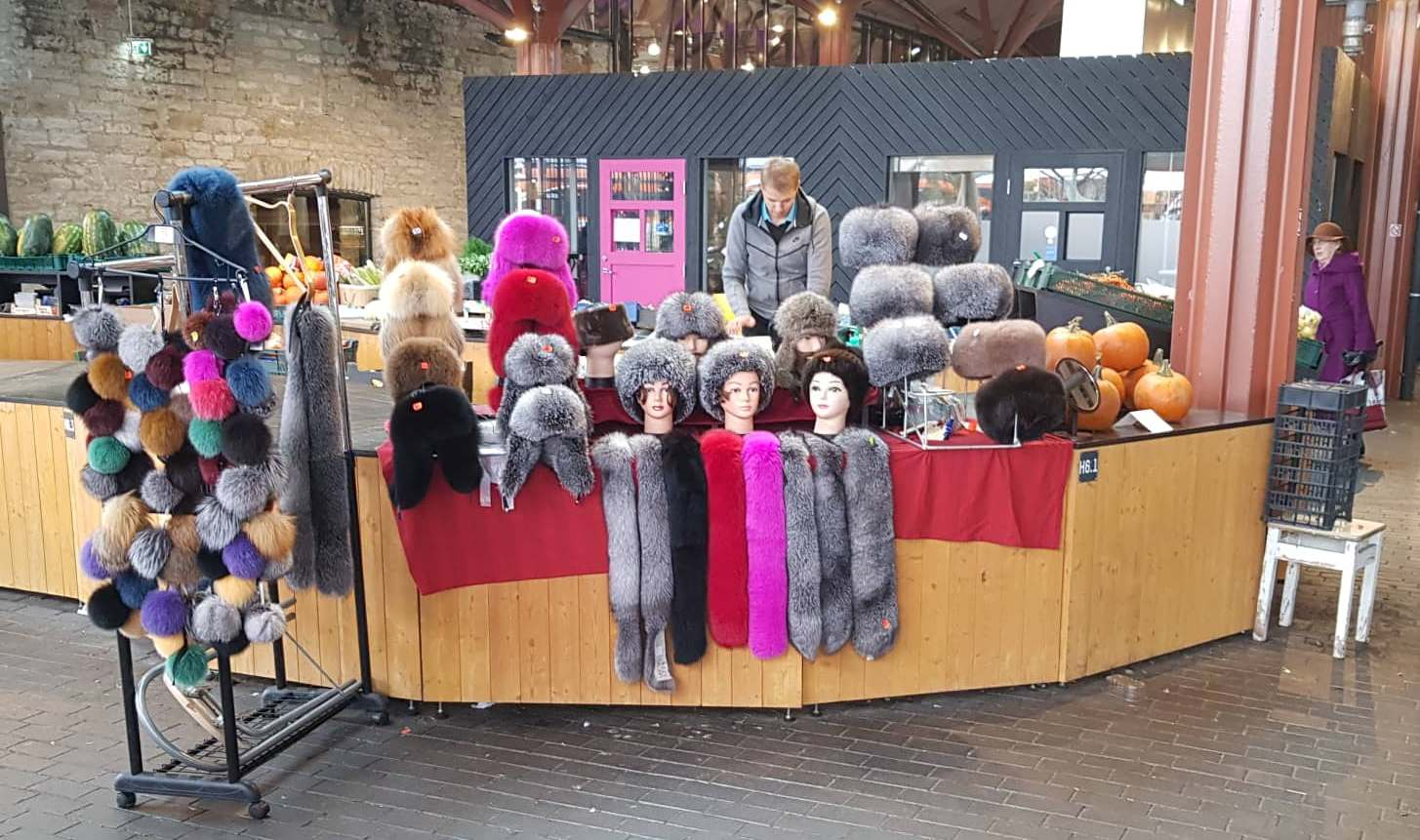
A fur shop in Tallinn, Estonia, in 2019

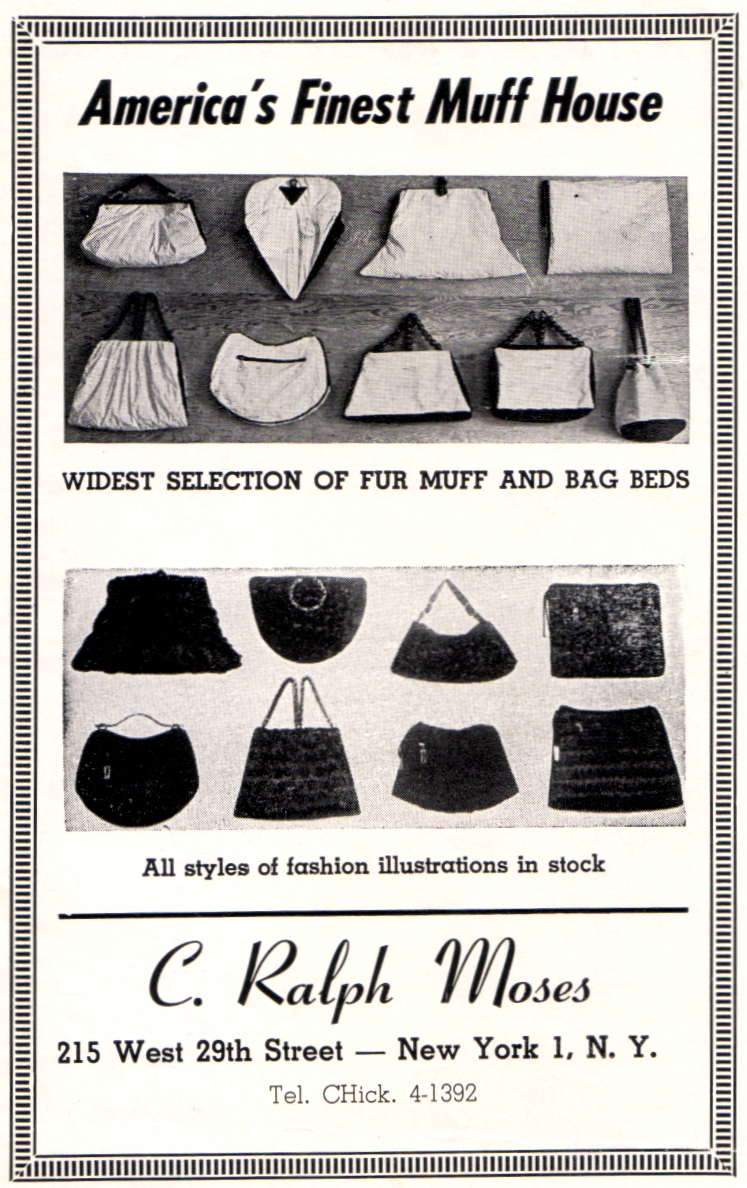
Fur muff manufacturer's 1949 advertisement

The fur trade is a worldwide industry dealing in the acquisition and sale of animal fur. Since the establishment of a world fur market in the early modern period, furs of boreal, polar and cold temperate mammalian animals have been the most valued. Historically the trade stimulated the exploration and colonization of Siberia, northern North America, and the South Shetland and South Sandwich Islands.

Today the importance of the fur trade has diminished; it is based on pelts produced at fur farms and regulated fur-bearer trapping, but has become controversial. Animal rights organizations oppose the fur trade, citing that animals are brutally killed and sometimes skinned alive. Fur has been replaced in some clothing by synthetic imitations, for example, as in ruffs on hoods of parkas.

== Continental fur trade ==
Which countries have banned fur trading

=== Russia ===
Before the European colonization of the Americas, Russia was a major supplier of fur pelts to Western Europe and parts of Asia. Its trade developed in the Early Middle Ages (500–1000 AD/CE), first through exchanges at posts around the Baltic and Black seas. The main trading market destination was the German city of Leipzig. Kievan Rus' was the first supplier of the Russian fur trade.

Originally, Russia exported raw furs, consisting in most cases of the pelts of martens, beavers, wolves, foxes, squirrels and hares. Between the 16th and 18th centuries, Russians began to settle in Siberia, a region rich in many mammal fur species, such as Arctic fox, lynx, sable, sea otter and stoat (ermine). In a search for the prized sea otter pelts, first used in China, and later for the northern fur seal, the Russian Empire expanded into North America, notably Alaska. From the 17th through the second half of the 19th century, Russia was the world's largest supplier of fur. The fur trade played a vital role in the development of Siberia, the Russian Far East and the Russian colonization of the Americas. As recognition of the importance of the trade to the Siberian economy, the sable is a regional symbol of Sverdlovsk Oblast in the Urals and Novosibirsk, Tyumen and Irkutsk Oblasts in Siberia.

European contact with North America, with its vast forests and wildlife, particularly the beaver, led to the continent becoming a major supplier in the 17th century of fur pelts for the fur felt hat and fur trimming and garment trades of Europe. Fur was relied on to make warm clothing, a critical consideration prior to the organization of coal distribution for heating. Portugal and Spain played major roles in fur trading after the 15th century with their business in fur hats.

==== Siberia ====
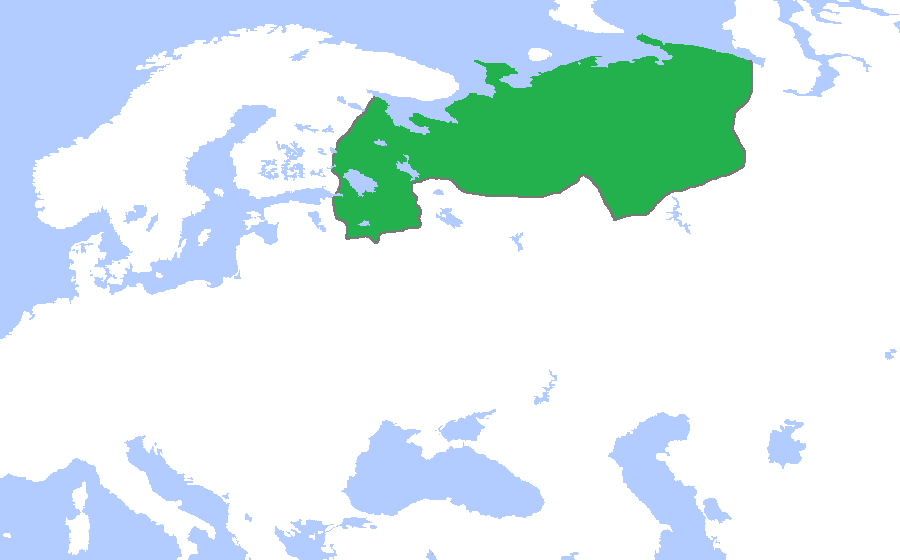
Possessions of the city-state of Novgorod c. 1400. Novgorod created a vast territorial empire and controlled much of the fur trade with Europe.

From as early as the 10th century, merchants and boyars of the city-state of Novgorod had exploited the fur resources "beyond the portage", a watershed at the White Lake that represents the door to the entire northwestern part of Eurasia. They began by establishing trading posts along the Volga and Vychegda river networks and requiring the Komi people to give them furs as tribute. Novgorod, the chief fur-trade center prospered as the easternmost trading post of the Hanseatic League. Novgorodians expanded farther east and north, coming into contact with the Pechora people of the Pechora River valley and the Yugra people residing near the Urals. Both of these native tribes offered more resistance than the Komi, killing many Russian tribute-collectors throughout the tenth and eleventh centuries.

As the Grand Principality of Moscow increased in power over the course of the 15th century and proceeded with the "gathering of the Russian lands", the Muscovite state began to rival the Novgorodians in the north for the Russian fur trade; ultimately, Novgorod would lose its autonomy and be absorbed by the authorities in Moscow along with its vast hinterland. At the same time, Moscow began subjugating many native tribes. One strategy involved exploiting antagonisms between tribes, notably the Komi and Yugra, by recruiting men of one tribe to fight in an army against the other tribe. Campaigns against native tribes in Siberia remained insignificant until they began on a much larger scale in 1483 and 1499–1500.

Besides the Novgorodians and the indigenes, the Muscovites also had to contend with the various Muslim Tatar khanates to their east. In 1552, Ivan IV, the tsar of all Russia, took a significant step towards securing Russian hegemony in Siberia when he sent a large army to attack the Khanate of Kazan and ended up obtaining the territory from the Volga to the Ural Mountains. At this point the phrase, "ruler of Obdor, Konda, and all Siberian lands" became part of the title of the tsar in Moscow. Even so, problems ensued after 1558 when Ivan IV sent Grigory Stroganov (c. 1533–1577) to colonize land on the Kama and to subjugate and enserf the Komi living there. The Stroganov family soon came into conflict in 1573 with the khan of Sibir whose land they encroached on. Ivan told the Stroganovs to hire Cossack mercenaries to protect the new settlement from the Tatars. From c. 1581 the band of Cossacks led by Yermak Timofeyevich fought many battles that eventually culminated in a Tartar victory in 1584 and the temporary end to Russian occupation in the area. In 1584, Ivan's son Feodor sent military governors (voivodas) and soldiers to reclaim Yermak conquests and officially to annex the land held by the Khanate of Sibir. Similar skirmishes with Tartars took place across Siberia as Russian expansion continued.

Map of Asia in 1636. With the conquest of Siberia in the 16th and 17th centuries, Russia gained access to the world's richest source of high quality fur.

Russian conquerors treated the natives of Siberia as easily exploited subjects who were inferior to them. As they penetrated deeper into Siberia, traders built outposts or winter lodges called zimovye where they lived and collected fur tribute from native tribes. By 1620 Russia dominated the land from the Urals eastward to the Yenisey valley and to the Altai Mountains in the south, comprising about 1.25 million square miles of land.

Furs would become Russia's largest source of wealth during the sixteenth and seventeenth centuries. Keeping up with the advances of Western Europe required significant capital and Russia did not have sources of gold and silver, but it did have furs, which became known as "soft gold" and provided Russia with hard currency. The Russian government received income from the fur trade through two taxes, the yasak (or iasak) tax on natives and the 10% "Sovereign Tithing Tax" imposed on both the catch and sale of fur pelts. Fur was in great demand in Western Europe, especially sable and marten, since European forest resources had been over-hunted and furs had become extremely scarce. Fur trading allowed Russia to purchase from Europe goods that it lacked, like lead, tin, precious metals, textiles, firearms, and sulphur. Russia also traded furs with Ottoman Turkey and other countries in the Middle East in exchange for silk, textiles, spices, and dried fruit. The high prices that sable, black fox, and marten furs could generate in international markets spurred a "fur fever" in which many Russians moved to Siberia as independent trappers. From 1585 to 1680, tens of thousands of sable and other valuable pelts were obtained in Siberia each year.

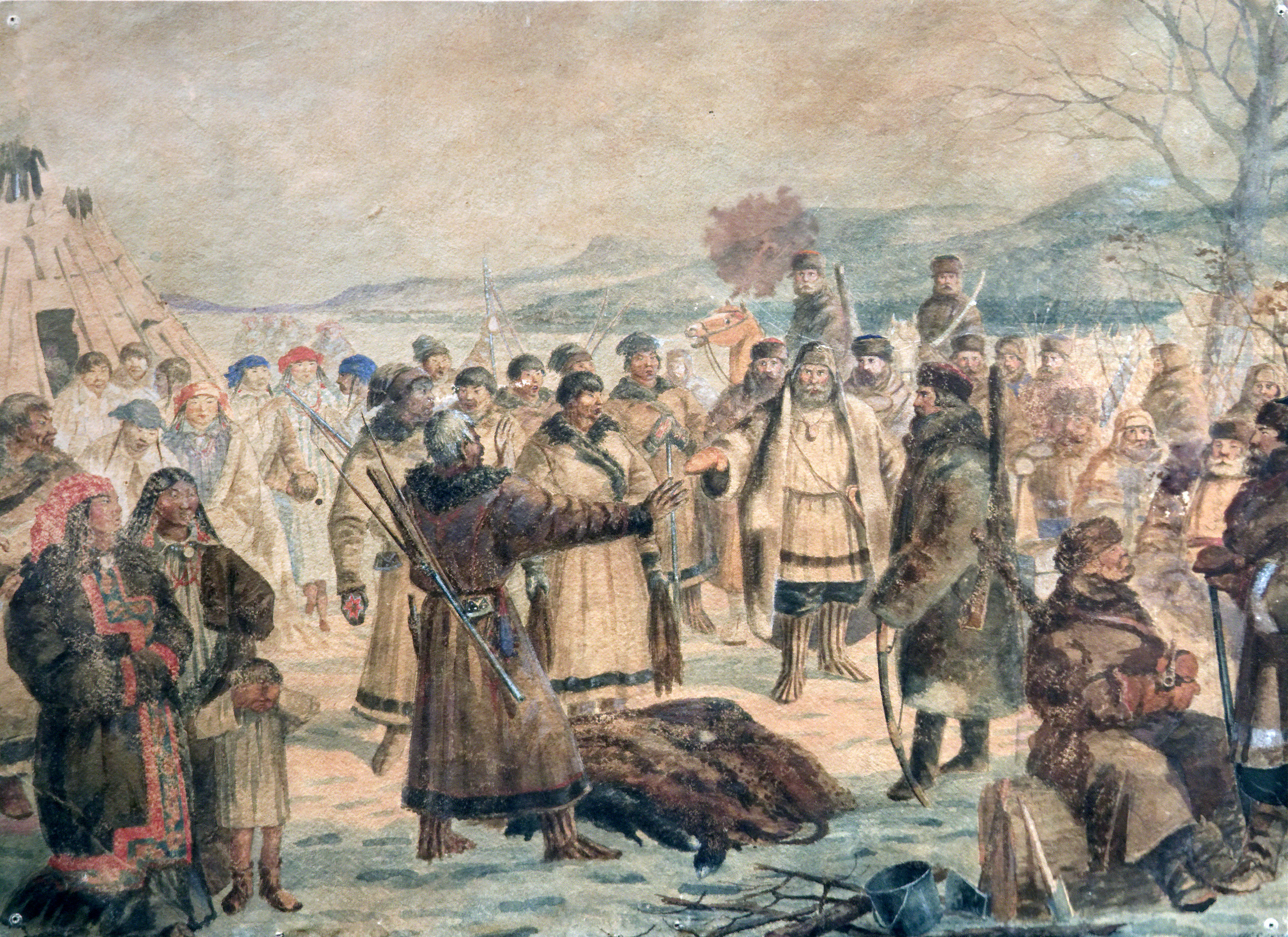
Cossacks collecting yasak in Siberia

The primary way for the Russian state to obtain furs was by exacting a fur tribute from the Siberian natives, called a yasak. Yasak was usually a fixed number of sable pelts which every male tribe member who was at least fifteen years old had to supply to Russian officials. Officials enforced yasak through coercion and by taking hostages, usually the tribe chiefs or members of the chief's family. At first, Russians were content to trade with the natives, exchanging goods like pots, axes, and beads for the prized sables that the natives did not value, but greater demand for furs led to violence and force becoming the primary means of obtaining the furs. The largest problem with the yasak system was that Russian governors were prone to corruption because they received no salary. They resorted to illegal means of getting furs for themselves, including bribing customs officials to allow them to personally collect yasak, extorting natives by exacting yasak multiple times over, or requiring tribute from independent trappers.

Russian fur trappers, called promyshlenniki, hunted in one of two types of bands of 10–15 men, called vatagi. The first was an independent band of blood relatives or unrelated people who contributed an equal share of the hunting-expedition expenses; the second was a band of hired hunters who participated in expeditions fully funded by the trading companies which employed them. Members of an independent vataga cooperated and shared all necessary work associated with fur trapping, including making and setting traps, building forts and camps, stockpiling firewood and grain, and fishing. All fur pelts went into a common pool that the band divided equally among themselves after Russian officials exacted the tithing tax. On the other hand, a trading company provided hired fur-trappers with the money needed for transportation, food, and supplies, and once the hunt was finished, the employer received two-thirds of the pelts and the remaining ones were sold and the proceeds divided evenly among the hired laborers. During the summer, promyshlenniki would set up a summer camp to stockpile grain and fish, and many engaged in agricultural work for extra money. During late summer or early fall the vatagi left their hunting grounds, surveyed the area, and set up a winter camp. Each member of the group set at least 10 traps and the vatagi divided into smaller groups of two to three men who cooperated to maintain certain traps. Promyshlenniki checked traps daily, resetting them or replacing bait whenever necessary. The promyshlenniki employed both passive and active hunting-strategies. The passive approach involved setting traps, while the active approach involved the use of hunting-dogs and of bows-and-arrows. Occasionally, hunters also followed sable tracks to their burrows, around which they placed nets, and waited for the sable to emerge.

The hunting season began around the time of the first snow in October or November and continued until early spring. Hunting expeditions lasted two to three years on average but occasionally longer. Because of the long hunting season and the fact that passage back to Russia was difficult and costly, beginning around the 1650s–1660s, many promyshlenniki chose to stay and settle in Siberia. From 1620 to 1680, a total of 15,983 trappers operated in Siberia.

=== North America ===
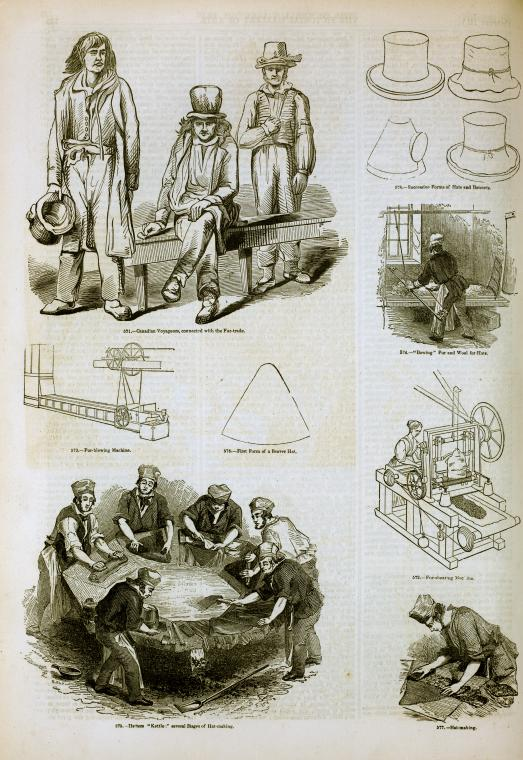
Fur-hat industry

The North American fur trade began as early as the 1500s between Europeans and First Nations (see: Early French Fur Trading) and was a central part of the early history of contact between Europeans and the native peoples of what is now the United States and Canada. Dr. S. E. Dawson's admirable "The Saint Lawrence Its Basin & Border-Lands" covers in detail the twenty-or-so main "gateways" connecting the St. Lawrence River with its neighbouring basins. Though these were all once canoe routes, not all were trade routes. In 1578 there were 350 European fishing vessels at Newfoundland. Sailors began to trade metal implements (particularly knives) for the natives' well-worn pelts. The first pelts in demand were beaver and sea otter, as well as occasionally deer, bear, ermine and skunk.

Fur robes were blankets of sewn-together, native-tanned, beaver pelts. The pelts were called castor gras in French and "coat beaver" in English, and were soon recognized by the newly developed felt-hat making industry as particularly useful for felting. Some historians, seeking to explain the term castor gras, have assumed that coat beaver was rich in human oils from having been worn so long (much of the top-hair was worn away through usage, exposing the valuable under-wool), and that this is what made it attractive to the hatters. This seems unlikely, since grease interferes with the felting of wool, rather than enhancing it. By the 1580s, beaver "wool" was the major starting material of the French felt-hatters. Hat makers began to use it in England soon after, particularly after Huguenot refugees brought their skills and tastes with them from France.

==== Early organization ====
General map of the "Beaver Hunting Grounds" described in "Deed from the Five Nations to the King, of their Beaver Hunting Ground", also known as the Nanfan Treaty of 1701

Captain Chauvin made the first organized attempt to control the fur trade in New France. In 1599 he acquired a monopoly from Henry IV and tried to establish a colony near the mouth of the Saguenay River at Tadoussac. French explorers, like Samuel de Champlain, voyageurs, and Coureur des bois, such as Étienne Brûlé, Radisson, La Salle, and Le Sueur, while seeking routes through the continent, established relationships with Amerindians and continued to expand the trade of fur pelts for items considered 'common' by the Europeans. Mammal winter pelts were prized for warmth, particularly animal pelts for beaver wool felt hats, which were an expensive status symbol in Europe. The demand for beaver wool felt hats was such that the beaver in Europe and European Russia had largely disappeared through exploitation.

In 1613 Dallas Carite and Adriaen Block headed expeditions to establish fur trade relationships with the Mohawk and Mohican. By 1614 the Dutch were sending vessels to secure large economic returns from fur trading. The fur trade of New Netherland, through the port of New Amsterdam, depended largely on the trading depot at Fort Orange (now Albany) on the upper Hudson River. Much of the fur is believed to have originated in Canada, smuggled south by entrepreneurs who wished to avoid the colony's government-imposed monopoly there.

Rupert's Land, granted as a commercial monopoly to the Hudson's Bay Company in 1670

England was slower to enter the American fur trade than France and the Dutch Republic, but as soon as English colonies were established, development companies learned that furs provided the best way for the colonists to remit value back to the mother country. Furs were being dispatched from Virginia soon after 1610, and the Plymouth Colony was sending substantial amounts of beaver to its London agents through the 1620s and 1630s. London merchants tried to take over France's fur trade in the St Lawrence River valley. Taking advantage of one of England's wars with France, Sir David Kirke captured Quebec in 1629 and brought the year's produce of furs back to London. Other English merchants also traded for furs around the Saint Lawrence River region in the 1630s, but these were officially discouraged. Such efforts ceased as France strengthened its presence in Canada.

Much of the fur trade in North America during the 17th and 18th centuries was dominated by the Canadian fur shipping network that developed in New France under the fur monopoly held first by the Company of One Hundred Associates, then followed in 1664 by the French West India Company, steadily expanding fur trapping and shipping across a network of frontier forts further west that eventually went all the way to modern day Winnipeg in Western Canada by the mid-1700s, coming into direct contact and opposition with the English fur trappers stationed out of York Factory at Hudson Bay. Meanwhile, the New England fur trade expanded as well, not only inland, but northward along the coast into the Bay of Fundy region. London's access to high-quality furs was greatly increased with the takeover of New Amsterdam, whereupon the fur trade of that colony (now called New York) fell into English hands with the 1667 Treaty of Breda.

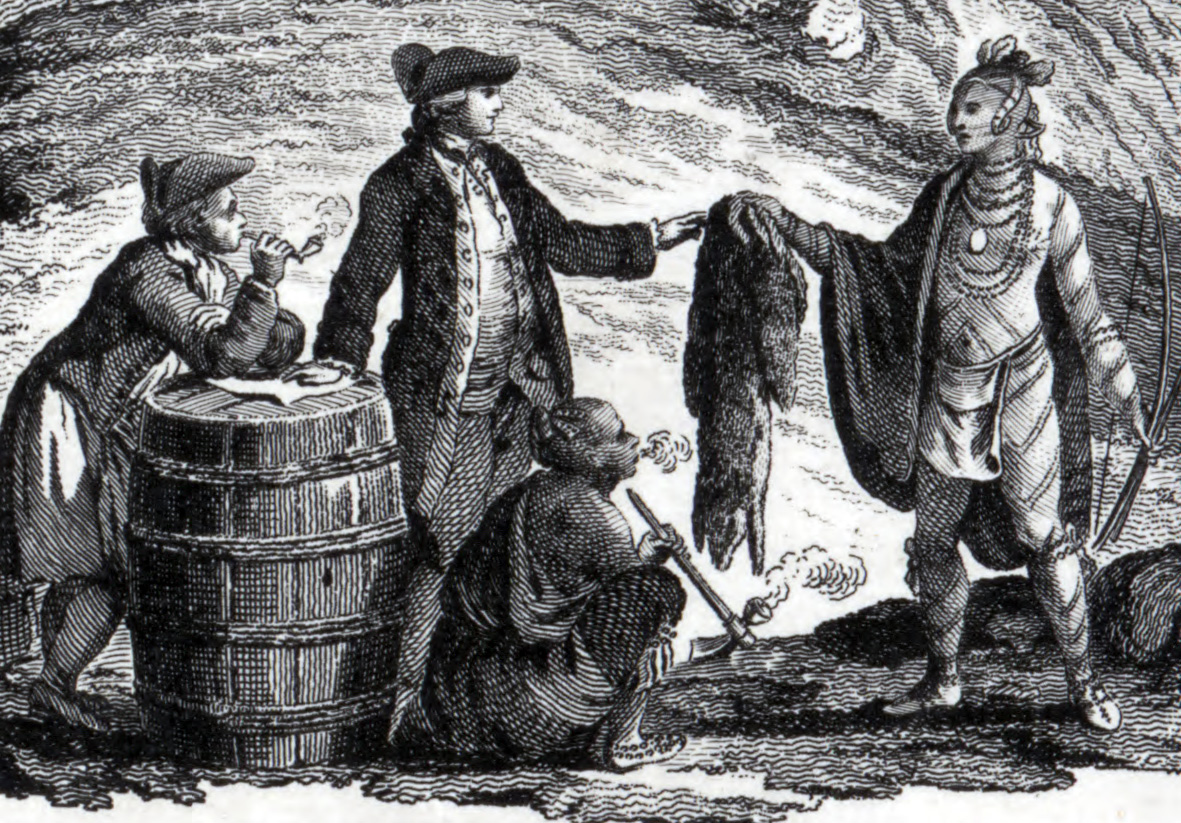
Fur traders in Canada, trading with Native Americans, 1777

In 1668 the English fur trade entered a new phase. Two French citizens, Pierre-Esprit Radisson and Médard des Groseilliers, had traded with great success west of Lake Superior in 1659–60, but upon their return to Canada, most of their furs were seized by the authorities. Their trading voyage had convinced them that the best fur country was far to the north and west, and could best be reached by ships sailing into Hudson Bay. Their treatment in Canada suggested that they would not find support from France for their scheme. The pair went to New England, where they found local financial support for at least two attempts to reach Hudson Bay, both unsuccessful. Their ideas had reached the ears of English authorities, however, and in 1665 Radisson and Groseilliers were persuaded to go to London. After some setbacks, a number of English investors were found to back another attempt for Hudson Bay.

Two ships were sent out in 1668. One, with Radisson aboard, had to turn back, but the other, the Nonsuch, with Groseilliers, did penetrate the bay. There she was able to trade with the indigenes, collecting a fine cargo of beaver skins before the expedition returned to London in October 1669. The delighted investors sought a royal charter, which they obtained the next year. This charter established the Hudson's Bay Company and granted it a monopoly to trade into all the rivers that emptied into Hudson Bay. From 1670 onwards, the Hudson's Bay Company sent two or three trading ships into the bay every year. They brought back furs (mainly beaver) and sold them, sometimes by private treaty but usually by public auction. The beaver was bought mainly for the English hat-making trade, while the fine furs went to the Netherlands and Germany.

Meanwhile, in the Southern colonies, a deerskin trade was established around 1670, based at the export hub of Charleston, South Carolina. Word spread among Native hunters that the Europeans would exchange pelts for the European-manufactured goods that were highly desired in native communities. Carolinan traders stocked axe heads, knives, awls, fish hooks, cloth of various type and color, woolen blankets, linen shirts, kettles, jewelry, glass beads, muskets, ammunition and powder to exchange on a 'per pelt' basis.

Colonial trading posts in the southern colonies also introduced many types of alcohol (especially brandy and rum) for trade. European traders flocked to the North American continent and made huge profits from the exchange. A metal axe head, for example, was exchanged for one beaver pelt (also called a 'beaver blanket'). The same pelt could fetch enough to buy dozens of axe heads in England, making the fur trade extremely profitable for the Europeans. The Natives used the iron axe heads to replace stone axe heads which they had made by hand in a labor-intensive process, so they derived substantial benefits from the trade as well. The colonists began to see the ill effects of alcohol on Natives, and the chiefs objected to its sale and trade. The Royal Proclamation of 1763 prohibited sale by European settlers of alcohol to the Indians in Canada, following the British takeover of the territory after it defeated France in the Seven Years' War (known as the French and Indian War in North America).

Following the British take over of Canada from France, the control of the fur trade in North America became consolidated under the British government for a time, until the United States was created and became a major source for furs being shipped to Europe as well in the nineteenth century, along with the largely unsettled territory of Russian America, which became a significant source of furs also during that period. The fur trade began to significantly decline starting in the 1830s, following changing attitudes and fashions in Europe and America which no longer centered around certain articles of clothing as much such as beaver skin hats, which had fueled the growing demand for furs, driving the creation and expansion of the fur trade in the 17th and 18th centuries, although new trends as well as occasional revivals of prior fashions would cause the fur trade to ebb and flow right up to the present.

===== Socioeconomic ties =====
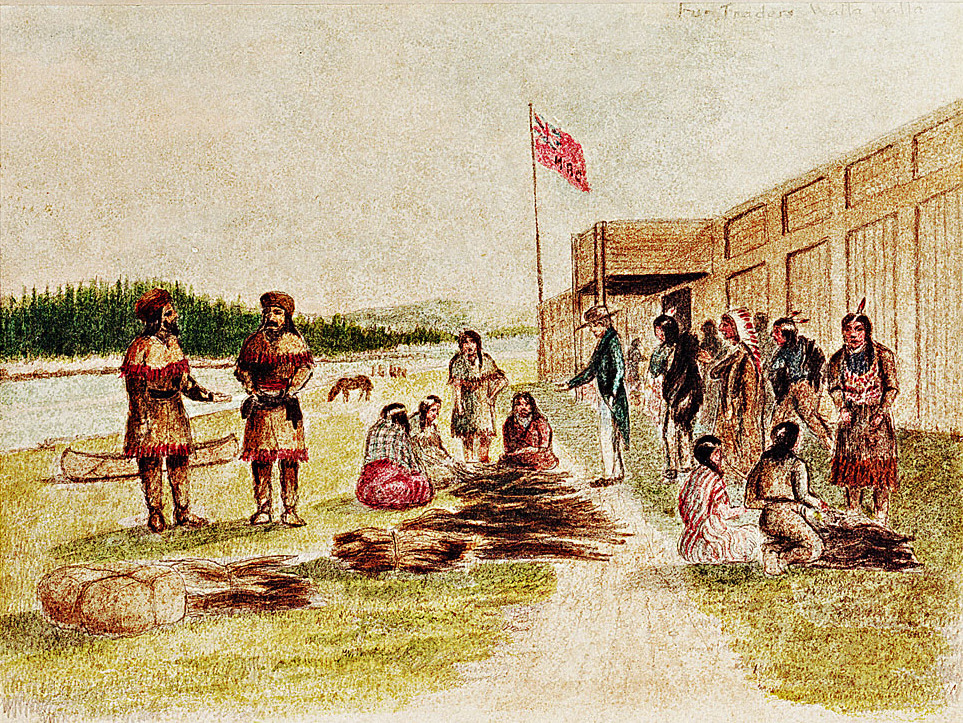
Fur trading at Fort Nez Percé in 1841

Often, the political benefits of the fur trade became more important than the economic aspects. Trade was a way to forge alliances and maintain good relations between different cultures. The fur traders were men with capital and social standing. Often younger men were single when they went to North America to enter the fur trade; they made marriages or cohabited with high-ranking Indian women of similar status in their own cultures. Fur trappers and other workers usually had relationships with lower-ranking women. Many of their mixed-race descendants developed their own culture, now called Métis in Canada, based then on fur trapping and other activities on the frontier.

In some cases both Native American and European-American cultures excluded the mixed-race descendants. If the Native Americans were a tribe with a patrilineal kinship system, they considered children born to a white father to be white, in a type of hypodescent classification, although the Native mother and tribe might care for them. The Europeans tended to classify children of Native women as Native, regardless of the father, similar to the hypodescent of their classification of the children of slaves. The Métis in the Canadian Red River region were so numerous that they developed a creole language and culture. Since the late 20th century, the Métis have been recognized in Canada as a First Nations ethnic group. The interracial relationships resulted in a two-tier mixed-race class, in which descendants of fur traders and chiefs achieved prominence in some Canadian social, political, and economic circles. Lower-class descendants formed the majority of the separate Métis culture based on hunting, trapping and farming.

Because of the wealth at stake, different European-American governments competed with various native societies for control of the fur trade. Native Americans sometimes based decisions of which side to support in times of war in relation to which people had provided them with the best trade goods in an honest manner. Because trade was so politically important, the Europeans tried to regulate it in hopes (often futile) of preventing abuse. Unscrupulous traders sometimes cheated natives by plying them with alcohol during the transaction, which subsequently aroused resentment and often resulted in violence.

In 1834 John Jacob Astor, who had created the huge monopoly of the American Fur Company, withdrew from the fur trade. He could see the decline in fur animals and realized the market was changing, as beaver hats went out of style. Expanding European settlement displaced native communities from the best hunting grounds. European demand for furs subsided as fashion trends shifted. The Native Americans' lifestyles were altered by the trade. To continue obtaining European goods on which they had become dependent and to pay off their debts, they often resorted to selling land to the European settlers. Their resentment of the forced sales contributed to future wars.

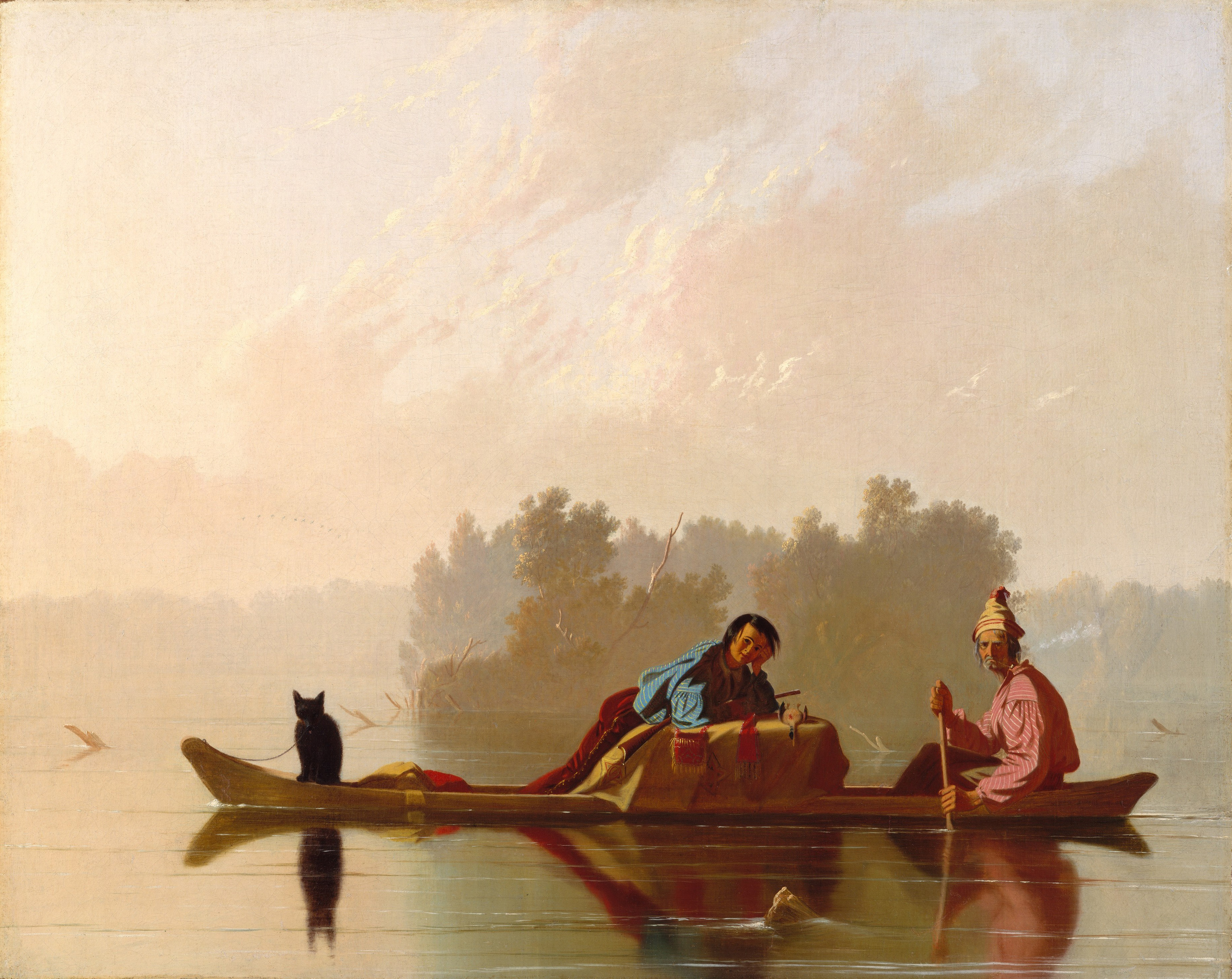
Fur Traders Descending the Missouri, c. 1845

After the United States became independent, it regulated trading with Native Americans by the Indian Intercourse Act, first passed on July 22, 1790. The Bureau of Indian Affairs issued licenses to trade in the Indian Territory. In 1834 this was defined as most of the United States west of the Mississippi River, where mountain men and traders from Mexico freely operated.

Early exploration parties were often fur-trading expeditions, many of which marked the first recorded instances of Europeans' reaching particular regions of North America. For example, Abraham Wood sent fur-trading parties on exploring expeditions into the southern Appalachian Mountains, discovering the New River in the process. Simon Fraser was a fur trader who explored much of the Fraser River in British Columbia.

===== Role in economic anthropology =====
Economic historians and anthropologists have studied the fur trade's important role in early North American economies, but they have been unable to agree on a theoretical framework to describe native economic patterns.

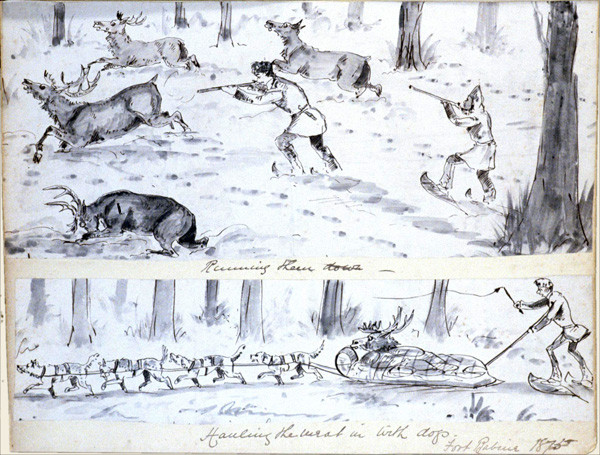
Sketches of life in the Hudson's Bay Company territory, 1875

John C. Phillips and J.W. Smurr tied the fur trade to an imperial struggle for power, positing that the fur trade served both as an incentive for expanding and as a method for maintaining dominance. Dismissing the experience of individuals, the authors searched for connections on a global stage that revealed its "high political and economic importance." E.E. Rich brought the economic purview down a level, focusing on the role of trading companies and their men as the ones who "opened up" much of Canada's territories, instead of on the role of the nation-state in opening up the continent.

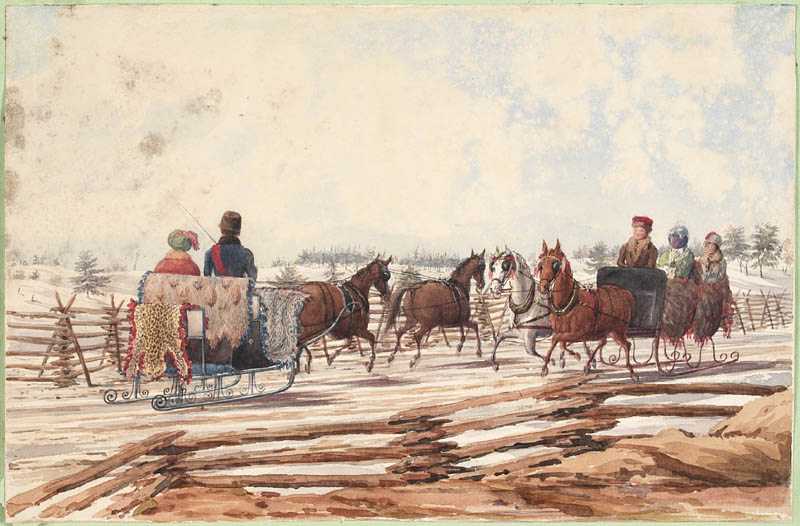
Two Sleighs on a Country Road, Canada, c. 1835–1848. Image includes a variety of fur throws and clothing, including hides of animals not native to Canada.

Rich's other work gets to the heart of the formalist/substantivist debate that dominated the field or, as some came to believe, muddied it. Historians such as Harold Innis had long taken the formalist position, especially in Canadian history, believing that neoclassical economic principles affect non-Western societies just as they do Western ones. Starting in the 1950s, however, substantivists such as Karl Polanyi challenged these ideas, arguing instead that primitive societies could engage in alternatives to traditional Western market trade; namely, gift trade and administered trade. Rich picked up these arguments in an influential article in which he contended that Indians had "a persistent reluctance to accept European notions or the basic values of the European approach" and that "English economic rules did not apply to the Indian trade." Indians were savvy traders, but they had a fundamentally different conception of property, which confounded their European trade partners. Abraham Rotstein subsequently fit these arguments explicitly into Polanyi's theoretical framework, claiming that "administered trade was in operation at the Bay and market trade in London."

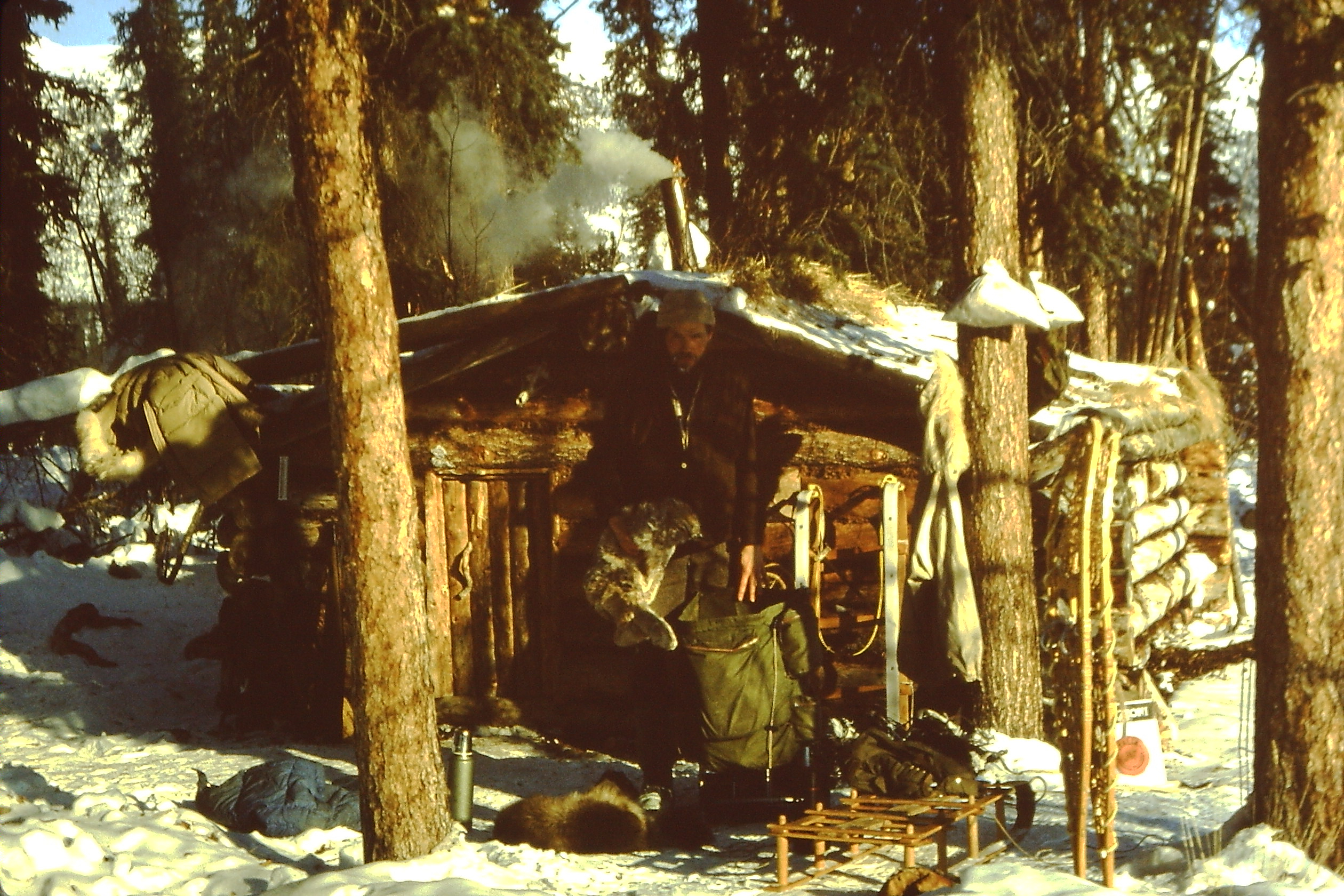
Trapper's cabin in Alaska, 1980s

Arthur J. Ray permanently changed the direction of economic studies of the fur trade with two influential works that presented a modified formalist position in between the extremes of Innis and Rotstein. "This trading system," Ray explained, "is impossible to label neatly as ‘gift trade', or ‘administered trade', or ‘market trade', since it embodies elements of all these forms." Indians engaged in trade for a variety of reasons. Reducing them to simple economic or cultural dichotomies, as the formalists and substantivists had done, was a fruitless simplification that obscured more than it revealed. Moreover, Ray used trade accounts and account books in the Hudson's Bay Company's archives for masterful qualitative analyses and pushed the boundaries of the field's methodology. Following Ray's position, Bruce M. White also helped to create a more nuanced picture of the complex ways in which native populations fit new economic relationships into existing cultural patterns.

Richard White, while admitting that the formalist/substantivist debate was "old, and now tired," attempted to reinvigorate the substantivist position. Echoing Ray's moderate position that cautioned against easy simplifications, White advanced a simple argument against formalism: "Life was not a business, and such simplifications only distort the past." White argued instead that the fur trade occupied part of a "middle ground" in which Europeans and Indians sought to accommodate their cultural differences. In the case of the fur trade, this meant that the French were forced to learn from the political and cultural meanings with which Indians imbued the fur trade. Cooperation, not domination, prevailed.

===== Present =====
According to the Fur Institute of Canada, there are about 60,000 active trappers in Canada (based on trapping licenses), of whom about 25,000 are indigenous peoples. The fur farming industry is present in many parts of Canada. The largest producer of mink and foxes is Nova Scotia which in 2012 generated revenues of nearly $150 million and accounted for one quarter of all agricultural production in the Province.

In 2000 there were 351 Mink farms in the U.S. As of 2015 there were 176,573 trappers in the U.S. with most being in the midwest. California was the first (and only) state to ban trapping for commercial and recreation purposes in 2015.

The North American Fur Auction (NAFA) occurs four times a year and attracts buyers from around the world.

According to the Northeast Association of Fish & Wildlife Agencies, at present approximately 270,000 families in the United States and Canada derive some of their income from fur trapping.

== Maritime fur trade ==
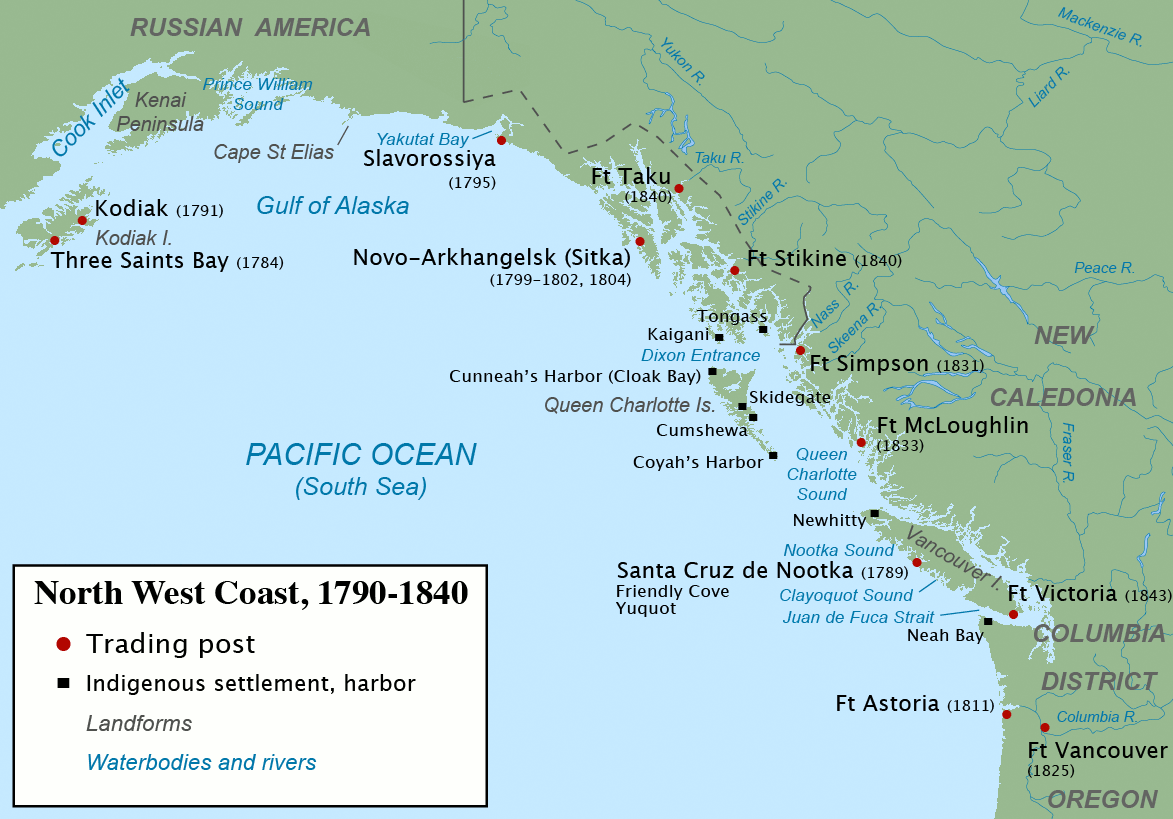
The North West Coast during the maritime fur trade era, about 1790 to 1840

The maritime fur trade was a ship-based fur trade system that focused on acquiring furs of sea otters and other animals from the indigenous peoples of the Pacific Northwest Coast and natives of Alaska. The furs were mostly traded in China for tea, silks, porcelain, and other Chinese goods, which were then sold in Europe and the United States. The maritime fur trade was pioneered by the Russians, working east from Kamchatka along the Aleutian Islands to the southern coast of Alaska. British and Americans entered during the 1780s, focusing on what is now the coast of British Columbia. The trade boomed around the turn of the 19th century. A long period of decline began in the 1810s. As the sea otter population was depleted, the maritime fur trade diversified and was transformed, tapping new markets and commodities while continuing to focus on the Northwest Coast and China. It lasted until the middle to late 19th century. Russians controlled most of the coast of what is now Alaska during the entire era. The coast south of Alaska saw fierce competition between, and among, British and American trading vessels. The British were the first to operate in the southern sector, but were unable to compete against the Americans who dominated from the 1790s to the 1830s. The British Hudson's Bay Company entered the coast trade in the 1820s with the intention of driving the Americans away. This was accomplished by about 1840. In its late period the maritime fur trade was largely conducted by the British Hudson's Bay Company and the Russian-American Company.

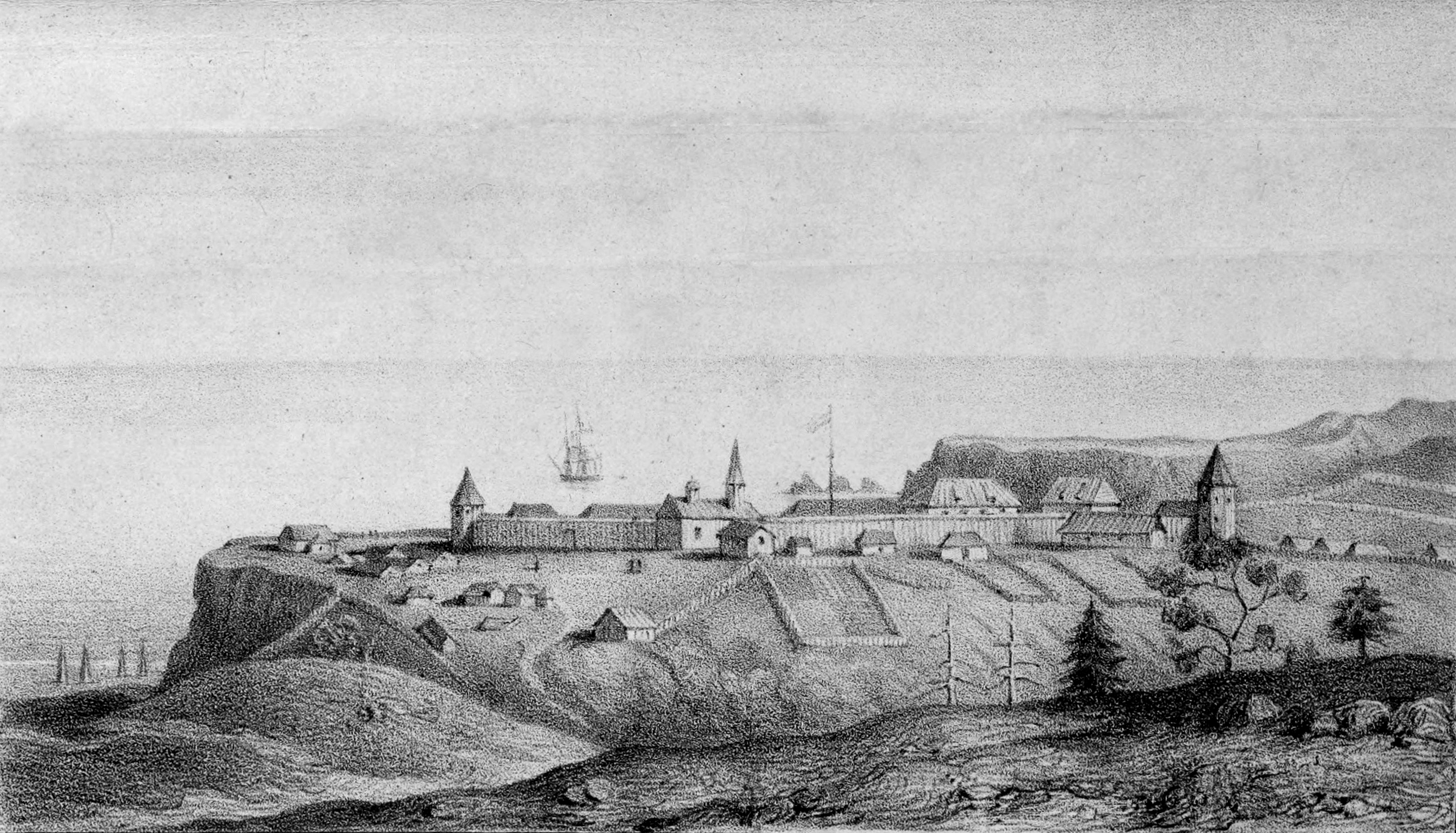
The Russian fur traders from Alaska established their largest settlement in California, Fort Ross, in 1812.

The term "maritime fur trade" was coined by historians to distinguish the coastal, ship-based fur trade from the continental, land-based fur trade of, for example, the North West Company and the American Fur Company. Historically, the maritime fur trade was not known by that name, rather it was usually called the "North West Coast trade" or "North West Trade". The term "North West" was rarely spelled as the single word "Northwest", as is common today.

The maritime fur trade brought the Pacific Northwest coast into a vast, new international trade network, centered on the north Pacific Ocean, global in scope, and based on capitalism but not, for the most part, on colonialism. A triangular trade network emerged linking the Pacific Northwest coast, China, the Hawaiian Islands (only recently discovered by the Western world), Europe, and the United States (especially New England). The trade had a major effect on the indigenous people of the Pacific Northwest coast, especially the Aleut, Tlingit, Haida, Nuu-chah-nulth, and Chinook peoples. There was a rapid increase of wealth among the Northwest Coast natives, along with increased warfare, potlatching, slaving, depopulation due to epidemic disease, and enhanced importance of totems and traditional nobility crests. The indigenous culture was not however overwhelmed, it rather flourished, while simultaneously undergoing rapid change. The use of Chinook Jargon arose during the maritime fur trading era and remains a distinctive aspect of Pacific Northwest culture. Native Hawaiian society was similarly affected by the sudden influx of Western wealth and technology, as well as epidemic diseases. The trade's effect on China and Europe was minimal. For New England, the maritime fur trade and the significant profits it made helped revitalize the region, contributing to the transformation of New England from an agrarian to an industrial society. The wealth generated by the maritime fur trade was invested in industrial development, especially textile manufacturing. The New England textile industry in turn had a large effect on slavery in the United States, increasing the demand for cotton and helping make possible the rapid expansion of the cotton plantation system across the Deep South.

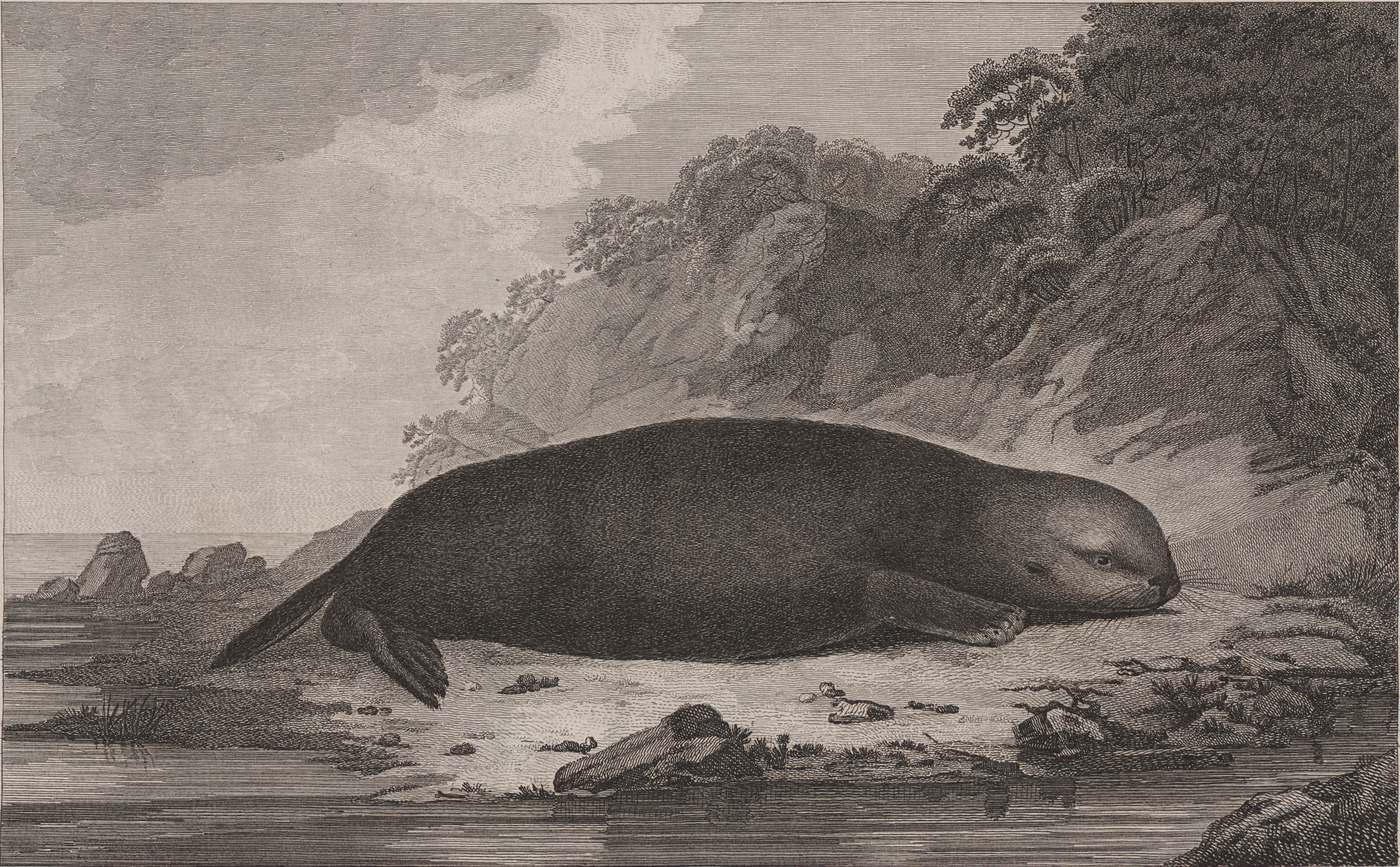
A sea otter, drawing by S. Smith after John Webber

Modern and historical ranges of sea otter subspecies

The most profitable furs were those of sea otters, especially the northern sea otter, Enhydra lutris kenyoni, which inhabited the coastal waters between the Columbia River to the south and Cook Inlet to the north. The fur of the Californian southern sea otter, E. l. nereis, was less highly prized and thus less profitable. After the northern sea otter was hunted to local extinction, maritime fur traders shifted to California until the southern sea otter was likewise nearly extinct. The British and American maritime fur traders took their furs to the Chinese port of Guangzhou (Canton), where they worked within the established Canton System. Furs from Russian America were mostly sold to China via the Mongolian trading town of Kyakhta, which had been opened to Russian trade by the 1727 Treaty of Kyakhta.

== See also ==
- Beaver Wars
- California Fur Rush
- The Coalition to Abolish the Fur Trade
- Coureur des bois
- Fur brigade
- List of fur trading post and forts in North America

== Bibliography ==
=== General surveys ===
- Chittenden, Hiram Martin. The American Fur Trade of the Far West: A History of the Pioneer Trading Posts and Early Fur Companies of the Missouri Valley and the Rocky Mountains and the Overland Commerce with Santa Fe. 2 vols. (1902). full text online
- Dolin, Eric Jay (2010). Fur, Fortune, and Empire: The Epic History of the Fur Trade in America (1st ed.). New York: W.W. Norton & Company. ISBN 978-0-393-06710-1.
- Fisher, Raymond Henry (1943). The Russian Fur Trade, 1550–1700. University of California Press. p. 275.
- Forsyth, James (1994). Reviewed work: A History of the Peoples of Siberia: Russia's North Asian Colony, 1581–1990., James Forsyth. Vol. 53. Cambridge: Cambridge University Press. pp. 905–906. doi:10.2307/2501564. ISBN 978-0521477710. JSTOR 2501564. S2CID 164630981.
- Naumov, Igor V. (22 November 2006). The History of Siberia. Routledge. ISBN 978-1-134-20703-9.
- Voorhis, Ernest, Historic Forts and Trading Posts of the French Regime and of the English Fur Trading Companies, 1930 (e-book – with maps.)

=== Biographies ===
- Berry, Don. A Majority of Scoundrels: An Informal History of the Rocky Mountain Fur Company. New York: Harper, 1961.
- Hafen, LeRoy, ed. The Mountain Men and the Fur Trade of the Far West. 10 vols. Glendale, California: A.H. Clark Co., 1965–72.
- Lavender, David. Bent’s Fort. Garden City, N.Y.: Doubleday, 1954.
- Lavender, David. The Fist in the Wilderness. Garden City, NY: Doubleday, 1964.
- Oglesby, Richard. Manuel Lisa and the Opening of the Missouri Fur Trade. Norman, Oklahoma: University of Oklahoma Press, 1963.
- Utley, Robert. A Life Wild and Perilous: Mountain Men and the Paths to the Pacific. New York: Henry Holt and Company, 1997.

=== Economic studies ===
- Allaire, Bernard. Pelleteries, manchons et chapeaux de castor: les fourrures nord-américaines à Paris 1500–1632, Québec, Éditions du Septentrion, 1999, 295 p. (ISBN 978-2840501619)
- Bychkov, Oleg V.; Jacobs, Mina A. (1994). "Russian Hunters in Eastern Siberia in the Seventeenth Century: Lifestyle and Economy" (PDF). Arctic Anthropology. 31 (1). University of Wisconsin Press: 72–85. JSTOR 40316350.
- Black, Lydia. Russians in Alaska, 1732–1867 (2004)
- Cronon, William. Changes in the Land: Indians, Colonists, and the Ecology of New England. New York: Hill and Wang, 1983.
- Gibson, James R. Otter Skins, Boston Ships, and China Goods: The Maritime Fur Trade of the Northwest Coast, 1785–1841. Seattle: University of Washington Press, 1992.
- Ray, Arthur J. The Canadian fur trade in the industrial age (1990)
- Ray, Arthur J., and Donald B. Freeman. "Give Us Good Measure": An Economic Analysis of Relations between the Indians and the Hudson's Bay Company Before 1763. Toronto: University of Toronto Press, 1978.
- Rotstein, Abraham. "Karl Polanyi’s Concept of Non-Market Trade." The Journal of Economic History 30:1 (Mar., 1970): 117–126.
- Vinkovetsky, Ilya. Russian America: an overseas colony of a continental empire, 1804–1867 (2011)
- White, Richard. The Middle Ground: Indians, Empires, and Republics in the Great Lakes Region, 1650–1815. Cambridge; New York: Cambridge University Press, 1991.
- White, Richard. The Roots of Dependency: Subsistence, Environment, and Social Change Among the Choctaws, Pawnees, and Navajos. Lincoln, Nebraska: University of Nebraska Press, 1983.

=== Social histories: Native Americans ===
- Brown, Jennifer S.H. and Elizabeth Vibert, eds. Reading Beyond Words: Contexts for Native History. Peterborough, Ontario; Orchard Park, N.Y.: Broadview Press, 1996.
- Francis, Daniel and Toby Morantz. Partners in Furs: A History of the Fur Trade in Eastern James Bay, 1600–1870. Kingston; Montreal: McGill-Queen's University Press, 1983.
- Holm, Bill and Thomas Vaughan, eds. Soft Gold: The Fur Trade & Cultural Exchange on the Northwest Coast of America. Portland, Oregon: Oregon Historical Society Press, 1990.
- Krech, Shepard III. The Ecological Indian: Myth and History. New York; London: W.W. Norton & Company, 1999.
- Krech, Shepard III, ed. Indians, Animals, and the Fur Trade: A Critique of Keepers of the Game. Athens: University of Georgia Press, 1981.
- Martin, Calvin. Keepers of the Game: Indian-Animal Relationships and the Fur Trade. Berkeley; Los Angeles; London: University of California Press, 1978.
- Malloy, Mary. Souvenirs of the Fur Trade: Northwest Coast Indian Art and Artifacts Collected by American Mariners, 1788–1844. Cambridge, Massachusetts: Peabody Museum Press, 2000.
- Ray, Arthur J. Indians in the Fur Trade: Their Role as Trappers, Hunters, and Middlemen in the Lands Southwest of Hudson Bay, 1660–1870. Toronto; Buffalo; London: University of Toronto Press, 1974.
- Vibert, Elizabeth. Trader’s Tales: Narratives of Cultural Encounters in the Columbia Plateau, 1807–1846. Norman: University of Oklahoma Press, 1997.

=== Social histories: women, Métis, voyageurs ===
- Brown, Jennifer S.H. Strangers in Blood: Fur Trade Company Families in Indian Country. Vancouver; London: University of British Columbia Press, 1980.
- Brown, Jennifer S.H. and Jacqueline Peterson, eds. The New Peoples: Being and Becoming Métis in North America. Winnipeg: University of Manitoba Press, 1985.
- Giraud, Marcel. The Métis in the Canadian West. Translated by George Woodcock. Edmonton: University of Alberta Press, 1986.
- Gitlin, Jay. The Bourgeois Frontier: French Towns, French Traders & American Expansion, Yale University Press, 2010
- Nicks, John. "Orkneymen in the HBC, 1780–1821." In Old Trails and New Directions: Papers of the Third North American Fur Trade Conference. Edited by Carol M. Judd and Arthur J. Ray, 102–126. Toronto: University of Toronto Press, 1980.
- Podruchny, Carolyn. Making the Voyageur World: Travelers and Traders in the North American Fur Trade. Lincoln: University of Nebraska Press, 2006.
- Podruchny, Carolyn. "Werewolves and Windigos: Narratives of Cannibal Monsters in French-Canadian Voyageur Oral Tradition." Ethnohistory 51:4 (2004): 677–700.
- Sleeper-Smith, Susan. Indian Women and French Men: Rethinking Cultural Encounter in the Western Great Lakes. Amherst: University of Massachusetts Press, 2001.
- Van Kirk, Sylvia. Many Tender Ties: Women in Fur-Trade Society, 1670–1870. Winnipeg: Watson & Dwywer, 1999.

=== Regional histories ===
- Allen, John L. "The Invention of the American West." In A Continent Comprehended, edited by John L. Allen. Vol. 3 of North American Exploration, edited by John L. Allen, 132–189. Lincoln: University of Nebraska Press, 1997.
- Braund, Kathryn E. Holland. Deerskins and Duffels: The Creek Indian Trade with Anglo-America, 1685–1815. Lincoln: University of Nebraska Press, 2008.
- Faragher, John Mack. "Americans, Mexicans, Métis: A Community Approach to the Comparative Study of North American Frontiers." In Under an Open Sky: Rethinking America’s Western Past, edited by William Cronon, George Miles, and Jay Gitlin, 90–109. New York; London: W.W. Norton & Company, 1992.
- Gibson, James R. Otter Skins, Boston Ships, and China Goods: The Maritime Fur Trade of the Northwest Coast, 1785–1841. Seattle: University of Washington Press, 1992.
- Gibson, Morgan Arrell. Yankees in Paradise: The Pacific Basin Frontier. Albuquerque: University of New Mexico Press, 1993.
- Keith, Lloyd, and John C. Jackson. The Fur Trade Gamble: North West Company on the Pacific Slope, 1800–1820 (Pullman: Washington State University Press, 2016). xiv, 336 pp.
- Malloy, Mary. "Boston Men" on the Northwest Coast: The American Maritime Fur Trade 1788–1844. Kingston, Ontario; Fairbanks, Alaska: The Limestone Press, 1998.
- Panagopoulos, Janie Lynn. "Traders in Time". River Road Publications, 1993.
- Ronda, James P. Astoria & Empire. Lincoln; London: University of Nebraska Press, 1990.
- Weber, David. The Taos Trappers: The Fur Trade in the Far Southwest, 1540–1846. Norman: University of Oklahoma Press, 1971.
- White, Richard (27 September 1991). Hoxie, Frederick E.; William L. Clements Library; Salisbury, Neal (eds.). The Middle Ground: Indians, Empires, and Republics in the Great Lakes Region, 1650–1815. Vol. 49. Cambridge: Cambridge University Press. pp. 283–286. doi:10.1017/CBO9780511976957. ISBN 978-0521371049. JSTOR 3630498.
- Wishart, David J. The Fur Trade of the American West, 1807–1840: A Geographical Synthesis. Lincoln: University of Nebraska Press, 1979.

=== Papers of the North American Fur Trade Conferences ===
The papers from the North American Fur Trade conferences, which are held approximately every five years, not only provide a wealth of articles on disparate aspects of the fur trade, but also can be taken together as a historiographical overview since 1965. They are listed chronologically below. The third conference, held in 1978, is of particular note; the ninth conference, which was held in St. Louis in 2006, has not yet published its papers.

- Morgan, Dale Lowell, ed. Aspects of the Fur Trade: Selected Papers of the 1965 North American Fur Trade Conference. St. Paul: Minnesota Historical Society, 1967.
- Bolus, Malvina. People and Pelts: Selected Papers. Winnipeg: Peguis Publishers, 1972.
- Judd, Carol M. and Arthur J. Ray, eds. Old Trails and New Directions: Papers of the Third North American Fur Trade Conference. Toronto: University of Toronto Press, 1980.
- Buckley, Thomas C., ed. (1984). Rendezvous: Selected Papers of the Fourth North American Fur Trade Conference, 1981. St. Paul, Minnesota: North American Fur Trade Conference.
  - White, Bruce M. "Give Us a Little Milk: The Social and Cultural Meanings of Gift Giving in the Lake Superior Fur Trade". In Buckley (1984), pp. 185–197.
- Trigger, Bruce G., Morantz, Toby Elaine, and Louise Dechêne. Le Castor Fait Tout: Selected Papers of the Fifth North American Fur Trade Conference, 1985. Montreal: The Society, 1987.
- Brown, Jennifer S. H., Eccles, W. J., and Donald P. Heldman. The Fur Trade Revisited: Selected Papers of the Sixth North American Fur Trade Conference, Mackinac Island, Michigan, 1991. East Lansing: Michigan State University Press, 1994.
- Fiske, Jo-Anne, Sleeper-Smith, Susan, and William Wicken, eds. New Faces of the Fur Trade: Selected Papers of the Seventh North American Fur Trade Conference, Halifax, Nova Scotia, 1995. East Lansing: Michigan State University Press, 1998.
- Johnston, Louise, ed. Aboriginal People and the Fur Trade: Proceedings of the 8th North American Fur Trade Conference, Akwesasne. Cornwall, Ontario: Akwesasne Notes Pub., 2001.
