= Agreement on International Humane Trapping Standards =

The Agreement on International Humane Trapping Standards (AIHTS) establishes the required standards for approval and certification of animal trapping devices.

== History ==
In 1991, following extensive pressure from the anti-fur lobby, the European Union (EU) passed Regulation 3254/91, which bans the import of wild fur products derived from 13 species into the EU from any country, unless the use of the leghold trap is prohibited in said country, or trapping methods used in that country meet internationally agreed humane trapping standards. EU Regulation 3254/91 remains in place in the EU today .

Following several years of negotiations, the EU agreed to two humane trapping agreements in 1997. The Agreement on International Humane Trapping Standards (AIHTS) was reached with the EU, Canada and Russia; a separate agreement was reached between the EU and United States due to US regulatory requirements. Both Agreements incorporate the same standards. The EU Council ratified them in 1998. All countries are encouraged to apply the AIHTS. Under these agreements, all traps must be tested against the standards set out in the AIHTS and, if they conform, must be certified by a designated competent authority. If they fail to meet the Standards, they must be replaced with traps that do.

== Status of the AIHTS ==
The AIHTS was signed by Canada and the EU in December 1997 and by the Russian Federation in April 1998. A separate bilateral agreement with equivalent standards was signed between the US and Europe in 1998. Both agreements are legally binding on all signatories.

The Russian parliament ratified the AIHTS for implementation on July 22, 2008. The European Parliament, as of 2008, has yet to approve a Directive to implement the Agreement within its member countries. Canada has been implementing the AIHTS on a bilateral basis (with the EU), in good faith, since the Canadian government ratified it in 1999. The USA has been progressing on implementing its best management practices under its bilateral EU agreement.

== Main points of the Agreement ==
Under the AIHTS, the parties (currently, Canada, EU and Russia) guarantee not to impose trade restrictions on fur products from listed species from other signatory countries. The Agreement establishes procedures for settling disagreements and does not affect the right to resort to WTO (World Trade Organization). The Agreement on International Humane Trapping Standards applies to listed species (total of 19) regardless of the reason for trapping, including:

- Wildlife management purposes, including pest control
- Obtaining fur, skin, or meat
- The capture of mammals for conservation

The AIHTS establishes criteria for rating traps by species and by method of use. Killing traps are rated according to the time to loss of consciousness. Restraining traps are rated according to injuries indicative of poor welfare. Ratings form part of the trap approval process.

The AIHTS establishes approval and certification standards for all types of traps and requires that traps be certified as meeting the AIHTS, initially by fall 2007. The Agreement prohibits the use of restraining and killing traps that are not certified in accordance with the Standards. However, it does not prevent individuals from constructing and using traps that comply with designs approved by the competent authorities. (Competent authorities are legal bodies that regulate trapping, including governments, government mandated agencies and those Aboriginal groups with authority to regulate wildlife management activities.) Traps not meeting the Agreement Standards must be phased out by the signatories. If there are no traps certified for a particular species, all traps legal for use for that species can continue to be used until certified traps become available and provided research continues to search for traps that meet the Agreement Standards.

== Other points in the AIHTS ==
Under the Agreement, parties are instructed to use their best efforts to ensure appropriate processes are in place for permitting the use of traps and for enforcing trap legislation within their jurisdiction. It is also recommended that parties have in place trapper training in humane devices/methods. The Agreement also advocates incorporating ISO testing procedures into the trap certification process.

Parties of the AIHTS (Canada, Russian Federation and EU) are required to meet on an ongoing basis. Delegates to these meetings make up the Joint Management Committee (JMC), established under the terms of the AIHTS to administer the Agreement. The US is a permanent observer on the JMC.

== Objectives of the Agreement on International Humane Trapping Standards ==
1. To meet a requirement of EU Regulation 3254/91
2. To pursue an international standard that scientifically addresses animal welfare related to trapping furbearers. This reduces the ability to force legislation based on political lobbying efforts
3. To enlist signatories to address the issue of animal welfare related to trapping, regardless of the reason the animals are trapped. Whether it is for pest control, research, disease control, wildlife management or the commercial fur trade, the AIHTS is designed to ensure that the same scientifically validated standards apply in all three jurisdictions.
4. To maintain access to the European wild fur market. As the world's fashion centre, the European Union remains an important market for North American wild fur

As the Agreement on International Humane Trapping Standards is a dynamic treaty, it provides opportunity for continuing the improvement of animal welfare related to trapping as new technology and scientific knowledge emerges

== Species covered by the AIHTS ==
In EU Regulation 3254/91, 12 North America and one Russian furbearer species were listed. Under the AIHTS, six additional European species were added. The Standards apply to the following 19 species:

Species List
Original 13	European Species Added
Badger	Badger
Beaver	Beaver
Bobcat	Lynx
Coyote	Pine marten
Ermine	Raccoon dog
Marten
Muskrat
Otter
Raccoon
Wolf
Sable (Russian)

Additional species, regardless of the reason for trapping them, may be included in the future as appropriate. All signatory parties must agree to any changes made to the species list.

== Traps covered by the AIHTS ==
AIHTS requirements for certification in accordance with the Standards do not apply to traps individually constructed by trappers.

=== Killing Traps ===
Definition: Traps designed and set with the intention of killing a trapped animal of the target species. May include restraining traps set as killing traps when used in water.

=== Restraining Traps ===
Definition: Traps designed and set to restrain a target animal's movements. For use on land only. This includes all traps such as the foot snare, the padded foothold trap and any other limb restraining traps that are not "conventional steel-jawed leghold restraining traps". It also applies to manufactured live capture cages and boxes.

== Implementation requirements and progress ==
Since autumn 2007, only certified traps are legally permitted for trapping the species listed in the Agreement on International Humane Trapping Standards. Local or regional jurisdictions may have additional regulatory requirements exceeding the AIHTS. Restraining Traps - The use, on land, of conventional steel-jaw leghold restraining traps for the following species is now prohibited:

Badger	Lynx
Beaver	Marten
Bobcat	Muskrat
Coyote	Otter
Ermine	Raccoon
Fisher	Wolf

Other restraining traps, such as laminated, padded, offset, foot snares and cage traps must meet the requirements of the AIHTS and be certified initially by 2007. If research has not identified certifiable traps for use on a particular species by 2007, the AIHTS has a provision for continued use of current traps while research continues. Research is ongoing among all four countries.

Trap Certification – The certification process for both restraining and killing traps began in 2002. Criteria for certification are:

- performance under AIHTS requirements
- safety and efficiency (as required by a competent authority)
- manufacturer must put certification mark on traps and provide instructions for use

As required under the Agreement, six provisional Joint Management Committee meetings have been held to date, in Edmonton, Alberta (2000), Brussels, Belgium (2002), St. Petersburg, Russia (2003), New York City, USA (2004), Quebec City, Canada (2005) and Brussels, Belgium (2008).

== See also ==
- Fur Institute of Canada
- International Union for Conservation of Nature (IUCN)
- International Organization for Standardization (ISO)
- World Trade Organization
