= Fur Institute of Canada =

- Abbreviation: FIC
- Type: Fur Institute of Canada
- Legal status: active
- Purpose: industry voice
- Headquarters: Ottawa, Ontario
- Region served: Canada
- Members: 100
- Official language: English; French

The Fur Institute of Canada (FIC) works to promote the fur trade and to advocate for the fur industry. The organization, has more than 100 members from industry and trade, government, Aboriginal groups and the scientific community.

The FIC manages Canada’s humane trap research and testing program through the Alberta Research Centre and in accordance with The Agreement on International Humane Trapping Standards (AIHTS). As the national voice for the Canadian fur sector the Institute provides information to the media, the public and governments pertaining to the economic, social, cultural, animal welfare and environmental issues surrounding today's fur trade.

== Mission ==
The mission of the Fur Institute of Canada is to promote the sustainable and wise use of Canada's fur resources.

== Values ==
The Fur Institute of Canada and its members promote the following values:

- The sustainable use and conservation of renewable resources.
- The continued improvement of animal welfare through ongoing research and the development of national and international trapping standards.
- The conservation and management of natural resources based on scientific evidence and traditional knowledge.
- Professionalism through continued education, licensing and research.
- Respect for people, animals and the environment.
- Respect for tradition, heritage and culture.
- Respect for the right of Aboriginal peoples to pursue their Aboriginal and Treaty Rights.

== Organizational structure ==
The Fur Institute was founded in 1983 on the initiative of the Federal, Provincial and Territorial Wildlife Ministers to pursue the work of the Federal-Provincial Committee for Humane Trapping. The FIC is governed by an elected Board of Directors representing all sectors of the industry and stakeholder groups.

=== Membership Categories ===
- Trappers
- Fur Farmers
- Wholesale Fur Dealers
- Fur Manufacturers/Processors
- Fur Retailers
- Aboriginal Organizations
- Conservation Organizations
- Animal Welfare Associations
- Support Industries
- Government of Canada
- Provincial and Territorial Governments

=== Operational Committees ===
Fur Institute of Canada programs are developed and delivered by six operational committees within the structure of the Institute. Committees are formed by, and report to, the Board of Directors.

==== Trap Research and Testing ====
Through research, development, communication and education, the Trap Research and Development Committee ensures that the best possible furbearer capture technology is available to Canadian trappers. This world recognized program seeks the highest level of animal welfare that can be achieved through traditional knowledge and current science. The trap research and testing program is conducted through the Alberta Research Centre. It adheres to the "Three R’s" of animal research and is overseen by the Canadian Council on Animal Care.

==== Conservation ====
Through policy development, evaluation, education and advocacy the committee furthers the principles of wise and sustainable use and of applied management in relation to furbearers and their habitats. The committee works in cooperation with wildlife agencies and conservation groups.

==== International Relations ====
By monitoring and participating in international activities on trapping, fur ranching, fur use and trade the committee is able to apprise and advise its members and stakeholders. This includes, but is not limited to, monitoring policies and activities of international organizations and governments affecting wildlife management or international trade, and participating in international forums, such as IUCN and CITES. The committee is also charged with managing the implementation in Canada of the 1997 Agreement on International Humane Trapping Standards (AIHTS) and provides a Canadian representative to the Joint Management Committee for the implementation of the AIHTS.

==== Communications ====
The FIC delivers and develops information and resources directed to the Institute membership, the fur trade, other conservation and animal welfare organizations and the public sector, including the media, schools, federal, provincial and territorial governments and the general public.

It is also a member of the North American Fur Industry Communications group (NAFIC), established in 2013 as a cooperative public educational program for the fur industry in Canada and the USA. NAFIC disseminates information via the Internet under the brand name "Truth About Fur".

Other members of NAFIC are: the auction houses American Legend Cooperative in Seattle, North American Fur Auctions in Toronto, and Fur Harvesters Auction in North Bay, Ontario; the American Mink Council, representing US mink producers; the mink farmers’ associations Canada Mink Breeders Association and Fur Commission USA; the trade associations Fur Council of Canada and Fur Information Council of America; Fur wRaps The Hill, the political and legislative arm of the North American fur industry; and the International Fur Federation, based in London, UK.

==== Aboriginal Communications ====
The committee is mandated to inform Canada’s Aboriginal trappers of important developments in the fur sector, particularly relating to international humane trapping standards and results of the trap research and testing program. The committee also facilitates communications and promotes joint programs between Aboriginal trappers and provincial and territorial wildlife agencies. Aboriginal organizations, governments and industry are kept informed of issues of concern to Aboriginal communities, trappers and the fur trade.

==== Sealing ====
The Sealing Committee ensures that factual information on seals and sealing in Canada is made available from primary sources, on a timely basis, to the general public, media and legislators in Canada and around the world. The committee also facilitates the Seals and Sealing Network (SSN).

== External memberships ==
The Fur Institute of Canada is an active member of various international fur trade and conservation organizations, including the IFTF (International Fur Trade Federation), the IUCN (World Conservation Union) Canadian Committee, and AFWA (Association of Fish and Wildlife Agencies).

== See also ==
- Agreement on International Humane Trapping Standards
- Animal trapping
- Timeline of environmental events
- Wildlife management
