= Tales of the World: Radiant Mythology 3 =

2011 video game

- Developer: Alfa System
- Publisher: Namco Bandai Games
- Composers: Takuya Yasuda; Kota Nakashima; Motoi Sakuraba; Kazuhiro Nakamura; Go Shiina
- Series: Tales
- Platform: PlayStation Portable
- Release: JP: February 10, 2011
- Genre: Action RPG
- Mode: Single-player

Tales of the World: Radiant Mythology 3 (テイルズオブザワールド レディアントマイソロジー3, Teiruzu Obu Za Wārudo Redianto Maisorojī 3) is the eight entry in the Tales of the World series, and the third entry in the Radiant Mythology series. Like most of the "Tales Of" games, the game is only available in Japanese. Like other games in the series, it features a group of characters from various Tales games.

== Gameplay ==
Like previous installments in the Radiant Mythology series, the player character will be capable of changing job classes by talking with this game's Guild Leader. Some job classes have special requirements in order for them to be unlocked, and players will have to expend grade points in order to transform into them.

The game features the past job classes from the two previous installments in the Radiant Mythology series, as well as introducing new ones.

- Warrior - A fighting class that specializes in close range combat.
- Swordsman - Has a variety of strong and quick sword attacks.
- Thief - Uses quick dagger attacks, giving enemies little chance to counter.
- Mage - Uses offensive magic spells for dealing damage.
- Priest - Specializes in healing and support magic.
- Fighter - Uses fast and power attacks based on martial arts.
- Hunter - Long range fighters that are masters at fighting with a bow.
- Magic Knight - A versatile class that uses both physical and magic attacks.
- Bishop - A master class of offensive and support magic artes.
- Ninja - A class that hides in the shadows and uses trickery to defeat enemies.
- Twinsword - A quick swordsman class that uses dual swords to deal fast attacks on the enemies.
- Brandish - A advanced form of a warrior that fights with broadswords.
- Monk - A fist fighting class that is able to use healing artes.
- Pirate - An agile class that is a master in both close and ranged combat with a dagger and pistol.
- Paladin - A swordsman class that uses broadswords and focuses on using healing artes.
- Gunman - A new class that is a master in ranged combat with dual guns.

As each job class is used, it increases in level and will over time eventually learn its job class specific Hi-ougi/Mystic Arte, which can be used to unleash a great deal of damage.

Class Name	First Appearance	Hi-Ougi/Mystic Arte
Warrior	Radiant Mythology	Infernal Ruin
Swordsman	Radiant Mythology	Dark Blade
Thief	Radiant Mythology	Death Spiral
Mage	Radiant Mythology	Indignant Judgement
Priest	Radiant Mythology	Sacred Shine
Fighter	Radiant Mythology	Fire Dragon Rampage
Hunter	Radiant Mythology	Wild Geese
Magic Knight	Radiant Mythology	Shining Bind
Bishop	Radiant Mythology	Divine Judgement
Ninja	Radiant Mythology	Nine Seals
Twin Sword	Radiant Mythology 2	Burning Phoenix
Brandish	Radiant Mythology 2	Wyrm Wrath
Monk	Radiant Mythology 2	Ground Breaker
Pirate	Radiant Mythology 2	Bullet of Force
Paladin	Radiant Mythology 2	Dragon Wrath
Gunman	Radiant Mythology 3	X Buster

== Characters ==
Like previous games in the Tales of the World: Radiant Mythology series, the game features various characters each from different games in the Tales series. The game has 80 different characters from past Tales games, including all of the 50 characters from Radiant Mythology 2.

=== Original ===
- Kanonno Grassvalley
- Rocks (Rocksprings)
- Lazaris
- Pasca Kanonno
- Mormo
- Kanonno Earhart
- Widdershin
- Goede

=== Series ===
Character	Original Appearance	Platforms	Year released	Status	Mystic Arte
Cress Albane	Tales of Phantasia	Super Famicom/PlayStation/Game Boy Advance/PlayStation Portable	1995/1998/2003/2006	Playable	Dark Blade
Mint Adenade	Tales of Phantasia	Super Famicom/PlayStation/Game Boy Advance/PlayStation Portable	1995/1998/2003/2006	Playable	Time Stop
Chester Burklight	Tales of Phantasia	Super Famicom/PlayStation/Game Boy Advance/PlayStation Portable	1995/1998/2003/2006	Playable	(Ten'i Jouhakyuu)
Arche Klein	Tales of Phantasia	Super Famicom/PlayStation/Game Boy Advance/PlayStation Portable	1995/1998/2003/2006	Playable	Big Bang
Suzu Fujibayashi	Tales of Phantasia	Super Famicom/PlayStation/PlayStation Portable	1995/1998/2003/2006	Playable	Jiraiya
Dhaos	Tales of Phantasia	Super Famicom/PlayStation/PlayStation Portable	1995/1998/2003/2006	Non-Playable	Super Dhaos Laser
Stahn Aileron	Tales of Destiny	PlayStation/PlayStation 2	1997/2006	Playable	Phoenix
Rutee Katrea	Tales of Destiny	PlayStation/PlayStation 2	1997/2006	Playable	Life Discharge
Leon Magnus	Tales of Destiny	PlayStation/PlayStation 2	1997/2006	Playable	Infernal Suffering
Woodrow Kelvin	Tales of Destiny	PlayStation/PlayStation 2	1997/2006	Playable	Azure Cannon^{2}
Philia Felice	Tales of Destiny	PlayStation/PlayStation 2	1997/2006	Playable	Sacred Penance
Mighty Kongman (Bruiser Khang)	Tales of Destiny	PlayStation/PlayStation 2	1997/2006	Playable	Tres Bien Hip
Lilith Aileron	Tales of Destiny	PlayStation/PlayStation 2	1997/2006	Playable	Thunder Sword
Chelsea Torn^{1}	Tales of Destiny	PlayStation/PlayStation 2	1997/2006	Playable	Wild Geese
Reid Hershel	Tales of Eternia	PlayStation/PlayStation Portable	2000/2005	Playable	Aurora Wall
Farah Oersted	Tales of Eternia	PlayStation/PlayStation Portable	2000/2005	Playable	Fire Dragon Rampage
Keele Zeibel	Tales of Eternia	PlayStation/PlayStation Portable	2000/2005	Playable	Rem
Chat	Tales of Eternia	PlayStation/PlayStation Portable	2000/2005	Playable	Eternal Hammer
Celsius	Tales of Eternia	PlayStation/PlayStation Portable	2000/2005	Playable	Ground Breaker
Meredy & Quickie^{1}	Tales of Eternia	PlayStation/PlayStation Portable	2000/2005	Playable	Shadow
Kyle Dunamis	Tales of Destiny 2	PlayStation 2/PlayStation Portable	2002/2007	Playable	Heavenward Thrust
Reala	Tales of Destiny 2	PlayStation 2/PlayStation Portable	2002/2007	Playable	Aqua Limit
Loni Dunamis^{1}	Tales of Destiny 2	PlayStation 2/PlayStation Portable	2002/2007	Playable	Final Prayer
Judas^{1}	Tales of Destiny 2	PlayStation 2/PlayStation Portable	2002/2007	Playable	Wolf's Penitence
Nanaly Fletch	Tales of Destiny 2	PlayStation 2/PlayStation Portable	2002/2007	Playable	Wild Geese
Harold Berselius	Tales of Destiny 2	PlayStation 2/PlayStation Portable	2002/2007	Playable	Princess of Mermaid (Start from Meteoric Rise)
Barbatos Goetia	Tales of Destiny 2	PlayStation 2/PlayStation Portable	2002/2007	Non-Playable	No Items Ever!
Lloyd Irving	Tales of Symphonia	GameCube/PlayStation 2/PlayStation 3	2003/2004/2013	Playable	Falcon's Crest
Colette Brunel	Tales of Symphonia	GameCube/PlayStation 2/PlayStation 3	2003/2004/2013	Playable	Holy Judgment
Genius (Genis) Sage	Tales of Symphonia	GameCube/PlayStation 2/PlayStation 3	2003/2004/2013	Playable	Indignation Judgment
Refill (Raine) Sage	Tales of Symphonia	GameCube/PlayStation 2/PlayStation 3	2003/2004/2013	Playable	Sacred Shine
Kratos Aurion	Tales of Symphonia	GameCube/PlayStation 2/PlayStation 3	2003/2004/2013	Playable	Shining Bind
Sheena Fujibayashi^{1}	Tales of Symphonia	GameCube/PlayStation 2/PlayStation 3	2003/2004/2013	Playable	Summon: Heart
Zelos Wilder	Tales of Symphonia	GameCube/PlayStation 2/PlayStation 3	2003/2004/2013	Playable	Shining Bind
Presea Combatir	Tales of Symphonia	GameCube/PlayStation 2/PlayStation 3	2003/2004/2013	Playable	Crimson Devastation
Yggdrasill / Mithos Yggdrasill^{1}	Tales of Symphonia	GameCube/PlayStation 2/PlayStation 3	2003/2004/2013	Non-Playable	Time Stop
Veigue Lungberg	Tales of Rebirth	PlayStation 2/PlayStation Portable	2004/2008	Playable	Celsius Calibur
Claire Bennett	Tales of Rebirth	PlayStation 2/PlayStation Portable	2004/2008	Non-Playable	None
Mao	Tales of Rebirth	PlayStation 2/PlayStation Portable	2004/2008	Playable	Inferno Drive
Eugene Gallardo	Tales of Rebirth	PlayStation 2/PlayStation Portable	2004/2008	Playable	Light Blast
Annie Barrs	Tales of Rebirth	PlayStation 2/PlayStation Portable	2004/2008	Playable	Wyrm Wrath
Tytree Crowe^{1}	Tales of Rebirth	PlayStation 2/PlayStation Portable	2004/2008	Playable	Crimson Phoenix^{2}
Saleh^{1}	Tales of Rebirth	PlayStation 2/PlayStation Portable	2004/2008	Non-Playable	Steife Brise
Senel Coolidge	Tales of Legendia	PlayStation 2	2005	Playable	Phantom Dragon Flurry
Shirley Fennes^{1}	Tales of Legendia	PlayStation 2	2005	Playable	Urel Nerifes
Will Raynard^{1}	Tales of Legendia	PlayStation 2	2005	Playable	Apocalyptica
Chloe Valens	Tales of Legendia	PlayStation 2	2005	Playable	(Musou Jinretsusen)
Norma Beatty^{1}	Tales of Legendia	PlayStation 2	2005	Playable	Originate Blaze
Jay^{1}	Tales of Legendia	PlayStation 2	2005	Playable	Flame Serpent Seal^{2}
Quppo^{1}	Tales of Legendia	PlayStation 2	2005	Non-Playable	None
Pippo^{1}	Tales of Legendia	PlayStation 2	2005	Non-Playable	None
Poppo^{1}	Tales of Legendia	PlayStation 2	2005	Non-Playable	None
Mimi Bread (Baker)^{1}	Tales of Legendia	PlayStation 2	2005	Non-Playable	None
Luke fon Fabre	Tales of the Abyss	PlayStation 2/Nintendo 3DS	2005/2011	Playable	Radiant Howl
Tear Grants	Tales of the Abyss	PlayStation 2/Nintendo 3DS	2005/2011	Playable	Innocent Shine
Guy Cecil	Tales of the Abyss	PlayStation 2/Nintendo 3DS	2005/2011	Playable	Razing Phoenix
Jade Curtiss	Tales of the Abyss	PlayStation 2/Nintendo 3DS	2005/2011	Playable	Mystic Cage
Anise Tatlin	Tales of the Abyss	PlayStation 2/Nintendo 3DS	2005/2011	Playable	Final Fury & Dying Moon
Asch	Tales of the Abyss	PlayStation 2/Nintendo 3DS	2005/2011	Playable	Rending Saber
Natalia L.K. Lanvaldear^{1}	Tales of the Abyss	PlayStation 2/Nintendo 3DS	2005/2011	Playable	Astral Rain
Van Grants^{1}	Tales of the Abyss	PlayStation 2/Nintendo 3DS	2005/2011	Playable	Imperial Slaughter
Caius Qualls	Tales of the Tempest	Nintendo DS	2006	Playable	Beast Blow
Rubia Natwick	Tales of the Tempest	Nintendo DS	2006	Playable	Sacred Shine
Ruca Milda	Tales of Innocence	Nintendo DS/PlayStation Vita	2007/2012	Playable	Infernal Overlord^{2}
Illia Animi	Tales of Innocence	Nintendo DS/PlayStation Vita	2007/2012	Playable	Ruined Vain Wish
Spada Belforma	Tales of Innocence	Nintendo DS/PlayStation Vita	2007/2012	Playable	Sundering Light^{2}
Ange Serena^{1}	Tales of Innocence	Nintendo DS/PlayStation Vita	2007/2012	Playable	Soaring Phoenix^{2}
Ricardo Soldato^{1}	Tales of Innocence	Nintendo DS/PlayStation Vita	2007/2012	Playable	Endless Tragedy
Coda^{1}	Tales of Innocence	Nintendo DS/PlayStation Vita	2007/2012	Non-Playable	None
Emil Castagnier^{1}	Tales of Symphonia: Dawn of the New World	Wii/PlayStation 3	2008/2013	Playable	Devil's Hellfire
Marta Lualdi^{1}	Tales of Symphonia: Dawn of the New World	Wii/PlayStation 3	2008/2013	Playable	Radiant Roar
Richter Abend^{1}	Tales of Symphonia: Dawn of the New World	Wii/PlayStation 3	2008/2013	Playable	Towering Inferno
Yuri Lowell	Tales of Vesperia	Xbox 360/PlayStation 3	2008/2009	Playable	Savage Wolf Fury
Estellise Sidos Heurassein	Tales of Vesperia	Xbox 360/PlayStation 3	2008/2009	Playable	Sacred Penance
Flynn Scifo^{1}	Tales of Vesperia	Xbox 360/PlayStation 3	2008/2009	Playable	Radiant Dragon Fang
Rita Mordio^{1}	Tales of Vesperia	Xbox 360/PlayStation 3	2008/2009	Playable	Ancient Catastrophe
Judith^{1}	Tales of Vesperia	Xbox 360/PlayStation 3	2008/2009	Playable	Radiant Moonlight
Raven^{1}	Tales of Vesperia	Xbox 360/PlayStation 3	2008/2009	Playable	Blast Heart
Shing Meteoryte^{1}	Tales of Hearts	Nintendo DS/PlayStation Vita	2008/2013	Playable	Solar Wind
Kohaku Hearts^{1}	Tales of Hearts	Nintendo DS/PlayStation Vita	2008/2013	Playable	Final Fury
Hisui Hearts^{1}	Tales of Hearts	Nintendo DS/PlayStation Vita	2008/2013	Playable	Golden Eagle
Asbel Lhant^{1}	Tales of Graces	Wii/PlayStation 3	2009/2010	Playable	Stampede Strike
Sophie^{1}	Tales of Graces	Wii/PlayStation 3	2009/2010	Playable	Critical Blade
Cheria Barnes^{1}	Tales of Graces	Wii/PlayStation 3	2009/2010	Playable	Garden of Innocence

Notes:
^{1} New to Radiant Mythology.
^{2} Unofficially translated name.

== Reception ==
Famitsu awarded the game a total of 35/40, composed of a 9/9/9/8 score. The game topped sales in the week it was released selling 222,068 units and improved PSP sales.
