= Tales of the World: Radiant Mythology =

2006 video game

- European cover art
- Developer: Alfa System
- Publishers: JP/NA: Namco Bandai Games; PAL: Ubisoft
- Composers: Takuya Yasuda; Motoi Sakuraba; Go Shiina
- Series: Tales
- Platform: PlayStation Portable
- Release: JP: October 12, 2006; NA: July 17, 2007; AU: September 6, 2007; EU: September 7, 2007
- Genre: Action role-playing
- Mode: Single-player

Tales of the World: Radiant Mythology (Note: Japanese: テイルズオブザワールド レディアントマイソロジー, Hepburn: Teiruzu Obu Za Waarudo Redianto Maisorojii) is a Japanese action role-playing game developed by Alfa System and published by Namco Bandai Games. It is part of the Tales series of video games, more specifically the fourth game in the Tales of the World spin-off series, which heavily emphasizes the crossover appearances of characters from past games in the series. The game was released in 2006 in Asia; July 2007 in North America; and September 2007 in Australia and Europe. The game saw two sequels, Radiant Mythology 2 and Radiant Mythology 3, though neither were released outside Japan. It is the only Tales of the World entry to be translated into English.

== Gameplay ==
The gameplay resembles that of a massively multiplayer online role-playing game dungeon crawler, but without the online component. Unlike games in the mainline series of Tales games, the player creates their own, customizable player, both in statistics and physical appearance. The players must accept quests at the local guild office from a selection of five different choices at a time. Quests include defeating certain monster types, mining or harvesting certain raw ingredients, or crafting certain goods. Upon completion of quests, the player is rewarded with money and "Fame" points. Money is used to upgrade weapons and equipment, making players more powerful, while "Fame" is used to progress the game's story. Additionally, the more "Fame" the player has, the more characters are available to be recruited, some of which are cross-over characters originating from prior games in the Tales series, namely Tales of Phantasia, Tales of Destiny, Tales of Eternia, Tales of Symphonia, Tales of Legendia, Tales of Rebirth, and Tales of the Abyss.

Beyond just creating the new, main character, the player is able to continually customize both statistics and physical appearances with the equipment collected throughout the game. Additionally, the game's crafting system allows the player to further customize their equipment by combining multiple items into one new item.

Upon completing the game at least once, two additional difficulty levels are unlocked, "Hard and "Very Hard" on top of the original default "Normal" level. Players can then restart the game with all their levels, in-game currency and items (except quest items) intact, and can switch difficulty levels at any point during the new game, as long as they are outside the explorable dungeons.

Characters will also learn Artes through leveling up which can be chained (basic to master to arcane) and by mastering these Artes will unlock the specific class's Mystic Artes/Hi-Ougi which can unleash a great deal of damage.

The player will also obtain Magic Map drops from random monsters during the course of the game. Magic Maps will open an "Ex" version of a specific dungeon and contain rare items and stronger enemies. Also, some quests trigger an event for the Radiant Quest which if completed will grant the player very powerful equipment for their specific class.

=== Job classes ===
- Warrior — Starter Class. Excels in melee attacks, and can equip powerful axes as well as swords.
- Thief — Starter Class. A professional in quick attacks and stealing, like Rutee Katrea or Ange Serena.
- Priest — Starter Class. A healer that uses light and healing magic.
- Mage — Starter Class. A magician that uses offensive magic to smite foes, like Genis Sage or Arche Klein.
- Swordsman — Elite Class. Uses sword-based artes used by many other Tales characters, like Cress Albane, or Luke fon Fabre.
- Fighter — Elite Class. Their most powerful weapon is their body. Like Senel Coolidge or Farah, they attack with their arms and legs rather than with weapons.
- Ninja — Elite Class. Assassin who specializes in stealthy strikes. Similar to Sheena Fujibayashi.
- Magic Knight — Elite Class. A warrior who masters physical and magical Artes. Similar to the likes of Zelos Wilder, Kratos Aurion, Norma Beatty or Will Raynard.
- Bishop — Elite Class. An elite magician who masters offensive and healing magic. Similar to Mint Adenade, or Raine Sage.
- Hunter — Elite Class. Marksmen who snipe enemies with the bow. Similar to Chester Barklight.

Non-playable

- Lancer - Elite Class. Only Eugene is this class.

=== Battle System ===
The game uses the Flex Range Linear Motion Battle System found in the PlayStation 2 game Tales of the Abyss. This system allows the player character to move freely across the field.

== Story ==
=== Synopsis ===
The world of Terresia is under assault by a "devourer", which seeks to consume its mana and leave it barren. Although the residents of the planet are unaware, this is actually a result of the actions of two entities named Widdershin and Aurora, the descenders of other worlds. As a last resort, the world's life-giving tree (the World Tree) uses the last of its power to create a Descender - the player's own character. The hero, after being awakened by a strange creature named Mormo whose own world was destroyed by the same threat, learns of the danger to this world's World Tree. Upon hearing a scream, the player rushes to discover that a girl is being attacked by a soldier. After rescuing the girl, she introduces herself as Kanonno, a member of an organization named Ad Libitum. This guild seeks to help the people of the world, fighting injustice and oppression. With no better leads, the player and Mormo set out to join Ad Libitum, hoping to learn more about the location of the devourer.

As always, the Tales of the World spin-offs add Tales characters from entries in the main installments. They play as NPCs that will assist the player throughout the game to stop the villain from destroying the world.

=== Characters ===
Original

- Kanonno — A girl who suffers from amnesia and who is later on revealed to be the descender of the foreign world of Pasca.
- Mormo — A descender from the world of Yaoon, who accompanies the descender of Terresia on a mission to destroy Gilgulim.
- Ganser — The ruler of Ailily, the city that rests adjacent to the World Tree. His oppressive attitude towards Ailily's citizens provoked Ad Libitum to conspire against him, and eventually, defeat him. It is revealed before facing him in the Orphic Maze that he worked with Widdershin.
- Aurora — A foreign Descender who worked with Widdershin.
- Widdershin — The descender of the world of Gilgulim, who plans to devour all worlds and merge them into one, immortal being, and the main antagonist of the story.

Playable characters

Character	Original Appearance	Platforms	Year released
Chester Burklight	Tales of Phantasia	Super Famicom	1995
Arche Klein	Tales of Phantasia	Super Famicom	1995
Stahn Aileron	Tales of Destiny	PlayStation	1997
Rutee Katrea	Tales of Destiny	PlayStation	1997
Leon Magnus	Tales of Destiny	PlayStation	1997
Reid Hershel	Tales of Eternia	PlayStation	2000
Lloyd Irving	Tales of Symphonia	GameCube	2003
Raine Sage	Tales of Symphonia	GameCube	2003
Kratos Aurion	Tales of Symphonia	GameCube	2003
Genis Sage	Tales of Symphonia	GameCube	2003
Eugene Gallardo	Tales of Rebirth	PlayStation 2	2004
Senel Coolidge	Tales of Legendia	PlayStation 2	2005
Luke fon Fabre	Tales of the Abyss	PlayStation 2	2005
Tear Grants	Tales of the Abyss	PlayStation 2	2005

== Development ==
Tales of the World: Radiant Mythology is the first and only of the Tales of the World spinoff series to be released in English.

Most Japanese releases of Tales games contain an additional subtitle referred to as a "characteristic genre name"; Tales of the World: Radiant Mythology's subtitle is An RPG For Your Sake (きみのためのRPG, Kimi no tame no RPG). The theme song for the game is Kamihikōki by Kana Uemura, and the opening song is Uemura's Hikari to Kage. Uemura previously did Kiseki, the opening theme for Tales of Commons. The US version of the game uses the same opening song, but without lyrics. This was due to licensing issues.

== Reception ==
Reception

Aggregate score
Aggregator	Score
Metacritic	66/100

Review scores
Publication	Score
Electronic Gaming Monthly	6.67/10
Famitsu	30/40
Game Informer	7/10
GamePro	4.25/5
GameRevolution	C+
GameSpot	6/10
GameSpy	4/5
GameZone	7.7/10
IGN	7.5/10
PlayStation: The Official Magazine	8/10

The game received "average" reviews according to video game review aggregator Metacritic. In Japan, Famitsu gave it a score of one eight, one seven, one eight, and one seven, for a total of 30 out of 40.

GameSpot stated that the game was "...the video game equivalent of fan fiction: familiar characters dropped into a formulaic story meant to elicit giggles from aficionados. Everything else is just the standard RPG rigmarole." IGN said, "With colorful graphics, a decent soundtrack (many of the songs are simple but catchy), 300 missions and countless hours of gameplay, it's hard to say too many negative things about Radiant Mythology."
