= List of theme songs in Tales series =

The Tales series, known in Japan as the Tales of series, is a franchise of fantasy Japanese role-playing video games published by Bandai Namco Entertainment (formerly Namco), and developed by its subsidiary, Namco Tales Studio until 2011 and presently by Bandai Namco. First begun in 1995 with the development and release of Tales of Phantasia for the Super Famicom, the series currently spans sixteen main titles, multiple spin-off games and supplementary media in the form of manga series, anime series, and audio dramas.

Multiple titles in the series use licensed theme songs by multiple Japanese artists: among the artists are Garnet Crow (Eternia), Deen (Destiny/Hearts), Kokia (Innocence) and Ayumi Hamasaki (Xillia/Xillia 2). One recurring aspect of many earlier localizations was the removal of the Japanese theme song, such as with Symphonia, which had its theme song replaced with an orchestral version. The first western release of a Tales title to feature the theme song used in Japan was Vesperia.

== Lists ==
=== Original Soundtracks ===
Title	Released	Game	Time	Label	Ref.
Tales of Phantasia Original Soundtrack Complete Version (Note: テイルズ オブ ファンタジア オリジナルサウンドトラック完全版)	21 January 1999	Tales of Phantasia (PlayStation)	141:43	Victor Entertainment	
Soundtrack "Tales of Destiny" (Note: サウンドトラック「テイルズ オブ デスティニー」)	11 March 2000	Tales of Destiny	110:03	Movic	
Tales of Destiny Original Soundtrack (Note: テイルズ オブ デスティニー オリジナル・サウンドトラック)	23 May 2007	Tales of Destiny	240:11	King Records	
Tales of Symphonia Original Soundtrack (Note: テイルズ オブ シンフォニア オリジナル・サウンドトラック)	1 October 2003	Tales of Symphonia	245:08	DigiCube	
Tales of Rebirth Original Soundtrack (Note: テイルズ オブ リバース オリジナル・サウンドトラック)	26 January 2005	Tales of Rebirth	275:14	King Records	
Tales of Legendia Original Soundtrack (Note: テイルズ オブ レジェンディア オリジナルサウンドトラック)	24 August 2005	Tales of Legendia	133:15	Avex Trax	
Tales of the Abyss Original Soundtrack (Note: テイルズ オブ ジ アビス オリジナル・サウンドトラック)	22 March 2006	Tales of the Abyss	264:49	King Records	
Tales of Innocence Original Soundtrack Another Innocence (Note: テイルズ オブ イノセンス オリジナルサウンドトラック アナザーイノセンス)	19 December 2007	Tales of Innocence	65:48	JVC Entertainment	
Tales of Graces Soundtrack (Note: テイルズ オブ グレイセス オリジナルサウンドトラック)	10 February 2010	Tales of Graces	231:01	Avex Trax	
Tales of Xillia Original Soundtrack (Note: テイルズ オブ エクシリア オリジナル･サウンドトラック)	7 September 2011	Tales of Xillia	223:41	Avex Trax	
Tales of Xillia 2 Original Soundtrack (Note: テイルズ オブ エクシリア2 オリジナル･サウンドトラック)	2 November 2012	Tales of Xillia 2		Avex Trax	

=== Related single albums ===
Album title	Released	Game	Artist	Label	Ref.
Yume wa Owaranai ~Kobore Ochiru Toki no Suzuku~ (Note: 夢は終わらない 〜こぼれ落ちる時の雫〜, Yume wa Owaranai ~Kobore Ochiru Toki no Suzuku; lit. "Dreams Won't End: Sprinkles of Time Drops")	22 November 1995	Tales of Phantasia	Yukari Yoshida (Note: 吉田由香里, Yoshida Yukari)	Victor Entertainment	

== Notes ==
Japanese

General notes
