= Keroro RPG: Kishi to Musha to Densetsu no Kaizoku =

2010 video game

- Developers: Namco Tales Studio; 7th Chord
- Publisher: Namco Bandai Games (Note: Published under the Bandai brand)
- Composers: Shinji Tamura; Hiroshi Tamura; Kenta Yabe
- Series: Sgt. Frog; Tales
- Platform: Nintendo DS
- Release: JP: March 4, 2010
- Genre: Action role-playing game
- Mode: Single-player

Keroro RPG: Kishi to Musha to Densetsu no Kaizoku (Note: Japanese: ケロロRPG 騎士と武者と伝説の海賊, Hepburn: Keroro RPG: The Knight, the Samurai, and the Legendary Pirate) is an action role-playing game developed by Namco Tales Studio and published by Namco Bandai Games for the Nintendo DS, which released in Japan in March 2010. It is the final game based on the Sgt. Frog franchise and features gameplay elements adapted from the Tales series, making it a spin-off to the main series.

== Gameplay ==
Keroro attacking a group of enemies

Out of battle, Keroro RPG has similar gameplay to other titles in the Tales series. The player visits various towns throughout the game, in which they can talk to various NPCs, buy items, and progress the story. The player also goes to dungeons, which contain various enemies, treasures, and puzzles. After battles, the player acquires gold to buy various things, and experience points, which goes toward leveling up the party. When traveling between towns and dungeons, the player travels through the field map, which sometime contains no enemies.

Unlike the other Keroro games, Keroro RPG uses the "Linear Motion Battle System", or LMBS. Like previous Tales games, Keroro RPG uses 2D sprites with combat taking place on a single two-dimensional line, and is completely real-time, with the player controlling one person and the others being controlled by A.I. if another person isn't controlling them. Similar to Tales of Hearts, only three party members are on the battlefield. The player also has the option of calling in characters from previous Namco-Bandai games to use an attack, including Pac-Man, The Prince, Taizo Hori, Don Wada and Klonoa, among others.

== Development ==
Keroro RPG: Kishi to Musha to Densetsu no Kaizoku was officially revealed in Famitsu as the mysterious K-Project by Namco-Bandai in 2009. It was revealed that Namco Tales Studio will do the gameplay mechanics just like the previous Tales series.

== Reception ==
Reception

Review scores
Publication	Score
Famitsu	32/40
RPGamer	4.5/5

Famitsu staff said "basically it's Tales of Keroro," one reviewer wrote, "They took the charm of the [anime] series and built the Tales system around it, creating a very orthodox but still well-made game. The battles are a little tough, but the combos are fun enough that you don't mind trying as often as it takes. It's also nice how you can change the difficulty level at any time." On the negative side, "the menu controls are a little annoying, and the field map seems a tad unfinished [...] The battles are so well done that it's a shame the story is so obviously a series of fetch quests."
