= Tales of Legendia =

2005 video game

- North American cover art
- Developer: Namco (Project MelFes)
- Publishers: JP: Namco; NA: Namco Hometek
- Director: Yuichiro Sadahiro
- Producer: Jun Toyoda
- Designer: Masaru Oowada
- Programmer: Yoshiaki Okano
- Artist: Kazuto Nakazawa
- Writers: Go Tanaka; Kouki Matsumoto
- Composer: Go Shiina
- Series: Tales
- Platform: PlayStation 2
- Release: JP: August 25, 2005; NA: February 7, 2006
- Genre: Action role-playing game
- Mode: Single-player

Tales of Legendia (Japanese: テイルズ オブ レジェンディア, Hepburn: Teiruzu Obu Rejendia) is an action role-playing game that was developed and published by Namco for the PlayStation 2. It is the seventh mainline title in their Tales series. Originally released in Japan in August 2005, it was later made available in English in North America in February 2006. The game was created by a development team known collectively as "Project MelFes", which was composed of members of Namco's Tales Studio along with developers from the company's Tekken and Soulcalibur fighting game series. It features character designs from anime artist Kazuto Nakazawa and music from composer Go Shiina, as well as songs performed by Do As Infinity, Donna Burke, and Kanon. Its producers gave it the characteristic genre name RPG Where Bonds Spin Legends (絆が伝説を紡ぎだすRPG, Kizuna ga densetsu o tsumugidasu RPG).

The game is set in a fantasy world covered in water, taking place entirely on a gigantic ship that is actually a remnant of an ancient civilization. Players assume the role of a young man named Senel, who must rescue his sister from individuals who believe her to be a prophesied savior, while the mysteries of his world begin to unravel before him. It received mostly mixed reviews upon its release in North America, with critics routinely commending the title's music while panning its derivative plot and tedious pace, and would sell approximately 397,000 copies worldwide.

== Gameplay ==
A real-time battle sequence. The 3D-rendered characters are restricted to a two-dimensional plane.

Tales of Legendia is a console role-playing game set in a fantasy world featuring three-dimensional characters and environments. The game is presented from a top-down perspective, and players must move their character through a number of locales, battle monsters, and interact with non-player characters to advance the story. Unlike previous games in the series where monsters were visible before being encountered, Tales of Legendia features randomized battles that occur every few steps while inside dungeons or other hostile areas.

Like previous games in the series, Tales of Legendia was designed to focus on the interactions between the main cast. However, a unique feature to this game is the addition of a second series of scenarios after the player has completed the main story that focuses more on the individual characters themselves. Animated sequences also accompany certain story segments.

The game features a variation of the series' Linear Motion Battle System, where players are able to freely move their characters around the battle area and engage enemies in real-time, known as the "X-LiMBS" (Crossover Linear Motion Battle System), which was specifically designed to resemble a traditional fighting game. Despite playable characters and enemies being rendered in 3D, battles are limited to a two-dimensional plane where combatants can only move forward, backward, or jump straight up into the air. In addition to normal attacks, players can attack enemies using special skills called "Eres", which involve spending Tech Points (TP), and can be chained together to create combos. A total of eight playable characters can be recruited as the game progresses, with up to four of them making up a player's party at any time. As players attack enemies, they fill up a "Climax" gauge at the bottom of the screen that can be expended to freeze all enemies in place for a short period. Whenever battles are completed, players are awarded both experience points that allow characters to gain levels and grow stronger, as well as items called "Eres Stones" that allow them to purchase additional skills.

== Plot ==
=== Setting ===
Tales of Legendia is set in a world covered mostly in water, with all the events of the game taking place aboard a massive, country-sized ship called the Legacy, a remnant of a highly advanced ancient civilization. The population is divided into two groups: the Orerines ("the people of the land") and the Ferines ("the people of the sea"), a race of fair-skinned, light-haired people with the ability to live underwater, with the tensions between them serving as the backdrop to the game's plot. In addition, a select portion of the population are known as "erens", people born with the ability to use special powers known as "eres", which are divided into two groups: crystal eres, which includes casting magic spells, and iron eres, which revolves around physical abilities. A fictional language known as Relares appears throughout the game, forming the basis for some location and character names.

=== Main characters ===
- Senel Coolidge (セネル・クーリッジ, Seneru Kūrijji) is a 17-year-old martial artist and marine of the Holy Alliance who can use iron eres. Although strong-willed and passionately protective of his surrogate "sister" Shirley, his cold nature comes off as uncaring to those around him. His name comes from Cuban writer Senel Paz.
- Shirley Fennes (シャーリィ・フェンネス, Shāri Fennesu) is a 15-year-old practitioner of crystal eres. She has a demure yet stubborn demeanor and is constantly chased by those who view her as the "Merines", the chosen one of the Ferines said to command great power. Her name comes from the 1849 novel Shirley by English author Charlotte Brontë.
- Will Raynard (ウィル・レイナード, Wiru Reinādo; Will Raynerd in the Japanese version) is a 28-year-old historian and local sheriff who can use crystal eres. The oldest character in the group, he is often looked to for leadership and advice, and is characterized as having a strict yet kind personality. His name comes from English writer William Shakespeare.
- Chloe Valens (クロエ・ヴァレンス, Kuroe Varensu) is a 17-year-old female knight from the prestigious House of Valens who uses iron eres. Her staunch determination to prove herself as a warrior worthy of her family name masks her true feminine nature. Her name comes from the character Chloë from the 1947 novel Froth on the Daydream by French author Boris Vian.
- Norma Beatty (ノーマ・ビアッティ, Nōma Biatti; Norma Biatty in the Japanese version) is a 16-year-old treasure hunter and practitioner of crystal eres. Uniformly cheerful and positive, she also possesses an insightful side and has a habit of creating nicknames for other members of the party. Her name comes from American author Norma Field.
- Moses Sandor (モーゼス・シャンドル, Mōzesu Shandoru) is the 17-year-old leader of a tribe of bandits and beast-tamers who wields a spear and uses iron eres. Despite his wild, uncouth exterior, he is a caring individual who looks after a large wolf-like creature named Giet (ギート, Gīto), and values family above all else. His name comes from Romanian writer Moses Gaster.
- Jay (ジェイ, Jei) is a cryptic 16-year-old ninja and practitioner of iron eres. He is characterized as being highly cynical and tends to liberally use cutting remarks, and has a talent for information gathering and analysis. His name comes from American author Jay McInerney.
- Grune (グリューネ, Guryūne) is a mysterious woman who wields magic water jugs and has the ability to use crystal eres. Despite being amnesiac, she is perpetually in high spirits and never strays from her calm demeanor, smiling almost constantly.

=== Story ===
The game begins as Senel and Shirley wash ashore on the Legacy after their boat is tossed in a storm. Shirley is soon kidnapped by a bandit named Moses, prompting Senel to team up with a local sheriff named Will and a female knight named Chloe to rescue her. Will explains that Shirley's arrival coincided with a pillar of light at the center of the ship, leading many to believe that she is the legendary "Merines", a person destined to lead the Ferines to prosperity. (Note: Will: That's right. It seems that the Merines was able to control this great ship using nothing but the power of his will. The reason Shirley is being pursued is because some people believe her to be a descendant of the Merines.) After finding her at the thieves' hideout, she is captured yet again by a Ferines soldier named Walter Delques, who takes her away. When the group eventually catches Walter, he reveals that he was only protecting her from the real enemy: the Orerine Crusand Empire Army, led by a man named Vaclav Bolud, who promptly arrives and abducts Shirley himself. While in captivity, Shirley becomes friends with another captive, a young Ferines girl named Fenimore Xelhes. (Note: Fenimore: My name is Fenimore. My true name is Xelhes./Shirley: Xelhes...That means "blessing."/Fenimore: Yes, though in my current situation, I'm not really in much of a blessing mood... What's your name?)

Senel and his team are joined by a treasure hunter named Norma as well as Moses, who has decided to atone for his earlier actions. Together, the team travels deeper into the ship, where they discover that not only does Vaclav have Shirley, but her older sister Stella, who Shirley and Senel believed dead three years earlier when the Empire's forces invaded their hometown. (Note: Vaclav: Stella never died! It's true, this girl stood before our army, risking her life to allow you and her sister to escape. However! She did not die. We captured her very much alive./Senel: No! Stella was alive! She...she wasn't dead after all... All this time... All this time I...) After being forced to escape when they are confronted by Vaclav's underlings, the Terrors, the party regroups and meets an amnesiac women named Grune and boy named Jay who joins the team and accompanies them to the Legacy's bridge. They confront Vaclav once more, who plans to use Shirley and Stella's latent Merines powers to activate a giant laser cannon located on the ship to destroy the Ferines' village and later subjugate other countries around the world. Although the party is victorious, Vaclav sets the cannon to fire in his final moments, with Stella in turn awakening her powers just in time to fly into the path of the beam, sacrificing herself. (Note: Senel: Don't go, Stella! Weren't you looking forward to performing the Rite of Feriyen?! To us.../Shirley: Senel.../Senel: If you go on without me, how can I propose to you? Stella?...Hey!)

Shirley resolves to complete a ritual to fully become the Merines and fulfill her destiny, meeting with Walter and the Ferines leader Maurits Welnes. However, soldiers from the country of Gadoria attack during the ceremony attempting to kill her thinking she willfully sided with Vaclav, with Fenimore jumping in the way of one of their blades and dying instead. The traumatic event causes Shirley to be fully engulfed by Nerifes, the malevolent spirit of the ocean itself, before leaving with Maurits. (Note: Shirley: I am the Merines. I hear the voice of Nerifes, and I am the agent of its will./Senel: Shirley, what's wrong? This isn't like you!/Shirley: I said, do not call me by that name. I am no longer the person who pretended to be your sister.) Senel and his friends go after her, passing through the deeper areas of the ship where they discover from fractured recordings that the Legacy was a colony ship from another world, and the Ferines came to the planet and made war with the Orerines 4000 years ago. Arriving at Maurits' stronghold, the party faces Walter, who reveals his jealousy over Shirley choosing Senel over him, and fights until his life gives out. (Note: Walter: Why...why you? Why...did the Merines...choose you? I was the one...who was supposed to protect her. Ever since...I was a child, that was my purpose...my mission in life.) They learn from Maurits that it was in fact the Orerines, not the Ferines, who are the outsiders. He explains that the Orerines' terraforming technology upset the will of the sea so much that his people can no longer live in it, and wishes to use Shirley to flood the world and appease the ocean so that the Ferines can thrive once more. (Note: Maurits: Heh heh...Hah hah hah! You fools think we Ferines came from another world, don't you? The truth is quite the opposite! We were the first ones on this world! It was your ancestors who came afterward!) After he is beaten and Shirley brought back to her senses, Maurits summons a physical manifestation of Nerifes itself, which is driven back by Senel and his friends. In the end, Maurits resolves to put aside old hatreds and work towards an era of peace between Orerines and Ferines as the characters return to their old lives. (Note: Maurits: Do not worry. We Ferines no longer have any reason to treat you Orerines as our enemy./Shirley: Ferines respect the will of Nerifes above all else./Maurits: Nerifes desires peace between the Ferines and Orerines. Therefore, we shall strive to accomplish that.)

== Development ==
Preliminary development on Tales of Legendia began in 2000, after the release of Tales of Eternia, with many of its staff drawn from that of Eternia. Its development happened in parallel to Tales of Destiny 2 and Tales of Symphonia. While its exact development time is unknown, a report in Famitsu stated that its development lasted three years. It was first revealed in December 2004 in a teaser trailer featured on a pre-order bonus disc for the series' previous title Tales of Rebirth, which only referred to the game by its development codename "Project MelFes". On February 14, 2005, Namco posted silhouettes of two characters on their Tales Channel website, with the game's official reveal coming four days later. A tentative Japanese release date of sometime in 2005 was announced the following month, with an English North American release formally announced by the company in April for February 2006. In May 2005, Namco gave a finalized Japanese release date set for the following August. The game would make an appearance at the 2005 Electronic Entertainment Expo in Los Angeles the following June.

The game was developed by a team that consisted of staff members from previous Tales entries, as well as developers from the company's Tekken and Soulcalibur fighting game series. Producer Jun Toyoda explained that the goal was to create a role-playing game with the "exhilarating battle scenes" found in those titles, and to appeal to players who either felt that fighting games lacked a story or felt that traditional role-playing game combat was too "tedious". Although the game features three-dimensional characters, battle sequences were purposefully restricted to a two-dimensional plane to allow the developers to create large monsters without fear of them obstructing the player's view of the action. Character animation was handled by Yosuke Kadowaki, who had previously used the same motion-capture technology on Soulcalibur II. The scenario was written by Koki Matsumoto and Tsuyoshi Tanaka. The main story theme was "bonds", with the main priority being the overlapping stories of the main cast. Unlike previous Tales games where character art and design was mostly done by either Kōsuke Fujishima or Mutsumi Inomata, Tales of Legendia features characters designed by anime illustrator and animator Kazuto Nakazawa, known for his prior work on the animated sequences from the 2003 film Kill Bill Vol. 1, as well as animated features such as El-Hazard and Nadia: The Secret of Blue Water. Tales of Legendia includes animated cutscenes produced by Japanese studio Production I.G., and contains more animation than any previous game in the series.

=== Audio ===
Tales of Legendia is the second main series title in the Tales franchise after Tales of the World: Summoner's Lineage which was composed by TAMA, to not feature music by Motoi Sakuraba, with composition duties instead going to Go Shiina. The game features the opening theme song "Tao" performed by J-pop group Do As Infinity, which is replaced with an original track, due to licensing issues, as well as the ending theme "My Tales" performed in English by Donna Burke and Gab Desmond. Incidental vocal songs include "A Firefly's Light" (蛍火, Hotarubi) performed in Japanese by Mayumi Sudou, "Hotarubi", performed in English by Donna Burke, "Let's Talk" (お話しましょう, Ohanashi Mashou) performed by the Suzukake Children's Choir, and both "The Legendary Sorcerer" (伝説の巫術士, Densetsu no Fujutsushi) and "The Birds Chirp, I Sing" (鳥は鳴き、僕は歌う, Toriba Naki, Boku wa Utau) both performed by Kanon. In addition, some of the game's instrumental themes were performed live by the New Japan Philharmonic Orchestra.

An official soundtrack was released in Japan in August 2005 by Avex Trax, which includes two discs of select tracks from the game, and a third disc that includes a radio drama featuring members of the game's voice cast. Two follow-up drama albums called Tales of Legendia ~Voice of Character Quest~ (テイルズ オブ レジェンディア ～voice of character quest～1, Teiruzu Obu Rejendia Voice of Character Quest) were released one year later in August and September 2006 respectively, with the second volume containing an additional 41 tracks not present on the previous official soundtrack release. Music from the game has been featured in video game concerts such as the Eminence Symphony Orchestra's A Night in Fantasia 2007 in Sydney, Australia, and Press Start -Symphony of Games- 2009 at the Tokyo Metropolitan Art Space.

== Reception ==
Reception

Aggregate scores
Aggregator	Score
GameRankings	73%
Metacritic	72/100

Review scores
Publication	Score
Edge	5/10
Electronic Gaming Monthly	6/10
Famitsu	32/40
Game Informer	7.25/10
GamePro	3.5/5
GameRevolution	C
GameSpot	8/10
GameSpy	3.5/5
GameZone	8.3/10
IGN	7.7/10
Official U.S. PlayStation Magazine	4/5
The A.V. Club	B+
The New York Times	(mixed)

Tales of Legendia was mostly well received in Japan, earning a 32 out of 40 total score from Weekly Famitsu based on individual reviews of 8, 8, 8, and 8, as well as an 85 out of 100 average from Dengeki PlayStation magazine based on scores of 80, 80, 90, and 90. The game would go on to sell 342,779 copies in the region by the end of 2005, becoming the 30th best-selling software title of that year, with a total of 397,000 copies sold worldwide by December 2007.

Elsewhere, Tales of Legendia received "mixed or average reviews" according to video game review aggregator Metacritic. While IGN felt that the game's characterization and "addictive" battle system were its high points, the title was ultimately marred by a "run of the mill" story and "lackluster" battle AI. The website would find that the game's second half was more enjoyable overall, stating that "Legendia is definitely slanted towards more action-oriented role-players who don't mind breezing through an easy twenty hours before getting to the real tests of skill," and although the voice acting was "rather stiff," the translation was of good quality overall. GameSpot similarly praised the strong cast of characters, and the interactions between them, but complained of excessive random battles and backtracking through locations in the game.

1UP.com praised the game's story, stating that "despite the predictability of the overall narrative, the details are frequently surprising and consistently entertaining," and additionally found that the game tended to flaunt convention in its characters: "Yet within this morass of overly familiar plot devices, Legendia tries to rise above its limitations by twisting conventions. The strongest combatants are female, and the burly man who wields a massive hammer plays the role of intellectual and healer." However, the website criticized the game for its sometimes "frustrating" combat and playing too similarly to past Tales titles, and that it would primarily appeal to longtime fans of the series. In 2012, 1UP would include Tales of Legendia on its list of "Underwhelming RPGs with Overwhelming Soundtracks," calling the game one of Go Shiina's strongest works and "one of the best and most moving RPG soundtracks to date."

The characters Chloe and Senel would rank 8th and 29th respectively in Namco Bandai's 2nd Top 30 character fan poll in 2005. Game Informer would also list Jay and Moses on their list of the best characters in the series that same year for "having some of the best banter in any Tales game."
