= Tales of Rebirth =

2004 video game

- Japanese PS2 cover art
- Developer: Namco Tales Studio
- Publishers: Namco; Namco Bandai Games (PSP)
- Directors: Eiji Kikuchi; Kiyoshi Nagai; Akiyoshi Sarukawa
- Producer: Makoto Yoshizumi
- Designer: Kazuya Ishizuka
- Artist: Mutsumi Inomata
- Writer: Hiramatsu Masaki
- Composers: Motoi Sakuraba; Shinji Tamura
- Series: Tales
- Platforms: PlayStation 2, PlayStation Portable
- Release: PlayStation 2: JP: December 16, 2004; PlayStation Portable: JP: March 19, 2008
- Genre: Action role-playing game
- Modes: Single-player, Multiplayer

Tales of Rebirth (Note: Tales of Rebirth (Japanese: テイルズ オブ リバース, Hepburn: Teiruzu Obu Ribāsu)) is a Japanese action role-playing game developed by Namco Tales Studio and published by Namco for the PlayStation 2. It is the sixth main entry of the Tales series of video games. Set in a world populated by humans (Huma) and beast people (Gajuma), it follows the adventures of Veigue Lungberg, a human whose friend Claire Bennett is kidnapped by agents of Agarte, heir to the throne of the kingdom of Karegia. Setting out to rescue Claire, Veigue and those who join him becomes entangled in escalating racial conflicts consuming the land.

As with previous Tales games, it features an action-based battle system, called the Three-Line Linear Motion Battle System. The game was developed by the 2D Tales development unit Team Destiny. The characters were designed by Mutsumi Inomata, who had previously worked on Tales of Destiny. The scenario, written by Hiramatsu Masaki, dealt extensively with issues of coexistence between races and ethnic conflicts. The game was released for the PlayStation 2 on December 16, 2004, and then later ported to the PlayStation Portable on March 19, 2008.

The game has received positive reviews and strong sales in Japan, with the PlayStation 2 version eventually selling over 600,000 units and the PSP re-release selling over 83,000. Western sites have been positive about the game, though neither version of the game has received English localizations.

== Gameplay ==
A battle sequence showing main character, Veigue, and key elements of the Three-Line Linear Motion Battle System

Tales of Rebirth is an action role-playing game with player characters rendered as two-dimensional sprites on three-dimensional backgrounds. Unlike previous Tales games, the camera follows the characters from a side-long view, zooming in or out depending on their relative position, and instead of a navigable overworld, players fast-travel to different locations using a standard map of the game world. Side conversations between characters called Skits (called "Screen Chat" (スクリーンチャット, Sukurīn Chatto) in Japanese) feature both story-relevant information and added details not essential to the story.

At certain locations in the game, characters can engage in cooking various recipes: cooking them between battles restores health points. If the recipe is cooked enough times, a character masters it. Upon mastery, a character is granted experience points each time the meal is prepared. Characters are also given "rations", helpings of restorative food, at selected locations across the game world. While initial rations are fairly small, a special "meal ticket" is made available later in the game, which provides larger rations. There are multiple difficulty levels. Mini-games are also available to play, with three types in the game. The first has the character Veigue on a raft navigating a river, with the goal being to avoid dangerous obstacles. The second is a tarot game with the character Hilda, where the player answers questions given by Hilda and has their fortune told. In the third, the player becomes a waiter at an inn, with the goal being to provide good service to the customers: poor service results in the player being dismissed, while good service earns a reward.

Rebirth uses the Tales series' trademark Linear Motion Battle System (LMBS), a real-time fighting system similar to a beat 'em up. Up to four characters can be present in battle. The variation used in Rebirth is the Three-Line LMBS, using a similar multi-plane mechanic to Tales of Symphonia: characters can be moved across three different levels on the battlefield to either attack enemies on those lines or dodge behind an enemy on one line to deal damage from behind. During battle, a character can activate the Rush Gauge, increasing a character's attack power at the cost of lowered defensive abilities and stats, and perform Mystic Artes (秘奥義, Hi Ougi) with another member of the party to inflict high damage on single enemies. During battles, performing certain feats in battle, such as finishing in a certain time, rewards the player with a grade for their performance.

Special abilities and actions are controlled by the Force Gauge, an energy meter which determines how long special skills can be active. Once drained, the skill cannot be activated until the meter refills, which it does during battles. Four skills can be equipped for each character. After battles, characters earn Enhancement Points (EP), which can be used to strengthen equipped armor, weapons and accessories, instead of using Gald (the in-game currency) as with previous Tales titles. EP can be transferred between weapons. An optional battle arena was added in the PSP version of the game with both single-player and multiplayer matches: in both modes, players need to defeat an enemy team (either AI-controlled enemies or an opposing team) within a time limit.

== Plot ==
=== Setting ===
Tales of Rebirth is set in a world where humans (called Huma) and beast people (Gajuma) coexist in relative peace. The world's magical power is called Force, which manifests in various people as control over an element or aspect of the physical laws. In ancient times, after a war sparked when Huma attempted to enslave Gajuma, both races joined forces to found the kingdom of Karegia. An unspecified time before the events of the game, Geyorkias, the ruler of a spirit race called the Sacred Beasts, sought to destroy the Huma as their dark emotions were fueling a primordial destructive force known as Yuris: the other Sacred Beasts put a stop to Geyorkias' plan by sealing him away, then acting to nullify Yuris' threat. The story opens with the death of Karegia's king, Ladras Lindblum, poisoned by the royal adviser Zilva Madigan: during his final moments, he releases his power into the world, causing many humans to become possessed by Force, including Veigue, Annie and Tytree. As the king has failed to name a successor, Karegia enters an interregnum at his death.

=== Characters ===
- Veigue Lungberg (ヴェイグ・リュングベル, Veigu Ryunguberu) is the protagonist of Tales of Rebirth, who wields a sword in battle and uses the Force of Ice. An orphan whose parents died when he was young, Veigue has been raised by the family of Claire Bennett. Veigue is cold, unsociable, and withdrawn, but when he is with Claire he softens.
- Claire Bennett (クレア・ベネット, Kurea Benetto) is the heroine of the game and the only main character not to use Force. Her family took Veigue in when he was a child. She rarely left her village of Sulz before the initial events of the game. Her focus on the positive traits of others, good heart, and optimism have earned her respect and admiration in the local community.
- Mao (マオ) is a boy who wields twin tonfas and wields the Force of Fire. Initially introduced as an amnesiac traveling with Eugene, who Mao views as a father figure, he is in reality a being called Orselg, created by the Sacred Beasts as their eyes into the mortal world.
- Eugene Gallardo (ユージーン・ガラルド, Yūjīn Gararudo), a powerful spear-wielding black panther Gajuma warrior gifted with the Force of Steel, is an ex-commander of the Karegia Kingdom. Originally part of the Royal Shield, bodyguards of the royal family, he was stripped of his rank and exiled after being framed for the murder of Doctor Barrs.
- Annie Barrs (アニー・バース, Anī Bāsu), is a staff-wielding spell caster who uses the Force of Rain. After her father died at Eugene's hands while the former is possessed by Zilva, Annie developed an intense hatred of Gajuma, and through most of the game she has difficulty dealing with her feelings.
- Tytree Crowe (ティトレイ・クロウ, Titorei Kurō) is a hotblooded young man who fights using a hand crossbow and martial arts, and is gifted with the Force of Wood. A worker in Petjanandka who cares deeply for his big sister, he has grand ideals regarding racial equality.
- Hilda Rhambling (ヒルダ・ランブリング, Hiruda Ranburingu) is a beautiful but cold fortune teller, fighting with magic cards in battle and using the Force of Lightning. She is revealed to have mixed Huma-Gajuma blood, causing her to suffer discrimination from both races.
- Milhaust Selkirk (ミルハウスト・セルカーク, Miruhausuto Serukāku) is a military leader and general of the Karegian kingdom, and a good friend of Eugene. Despite standing on the antagonistic side, Milhaust is usually amiable and rarely attacks the group on a whim, and at times lends his hand to help the team.
- Agarte Lindblum (アガーテ・リンドブロム, Agāte Rindoburomu) is a cat gajuma daughter of the late king Ladras Lindblum and heir to the throne of Karegia by blood. Her naivety and love for Milhaust are the inadvertent cause of many of the game's events.
- Zilva Madigan (ジルバ・マディガン, Jiruba Madigan) is a goat gajuma royal adviser, often referred to as the "princess" because of her familial and political ties with the royal family, and the game's main antagonist. Hiding her dark schemes, she acts as a maternal figure and adviser for Agarte.
- The Four Stars, an elite division of the Callegea Kingdom Army who serve directly under Agarte Lindblum, composed of: Saleh, a cruel Huma, who possesses the Force of Storm, Tohma, a brutish bull Gajuma who possesses the Force of Magnet, Militsa, a brainwashed Huma-Gajuma halfbreed who possesses the Force of Rainbow and Walto, a bat Gajuma who is good friends with Eugene and possesses the Force of Sound.

=== Story ===
During the initial unleashing of the king's power, Veigue's Force of Ice goes out of control, causing his friend Claire to become imprisoned in an ice pillar. One year after this, Veigue is contacted by Eugene and Mao, who help free Claire from the ice pillar. Shortly after this, Claire is taken away by agents of Agarte, who is searching for the most beautiful Huma woman in the land. Veigue heads out with Eugene and Mao to rescue Claire, eventually joining forces with Annie, Tytree and Hilda. Upon reaching the royal capital of Balka, the group find Agarte using her Force of the Moon to resurrect Geyorkias in the belief that the spirit will save her kingdom from the chaos consuming it, having been prompted by Zilva. When summoned, Geyorkias declares his intent to destroy the Huma population, forcing the group to attack and destroy his physical form. With Geyorkias gone and Claire rescued, the group part ways, but are brought back together as outbreaks of racial violence from both Huma and Gajuma begin destabilizing Karegia, caused by the hatred the summoned Geyorkias released after his defeat. To quell the violence, the group decide to summon the other Sacred Beasts in the hope of purging Geyorkias' hatred from the land. After rescuing Agarte from a Huma mob, it is revealed that Agarte switched bodies with Claire. In the aftermath, Agarte reveals that she originally captured Claire so she could switch bodies and realize her love for her bodyguard Milhaust, as relations between Huma and Gajama are taboo. Unfortunately, the trauma of events has caused Agarte to lose her Force abilities, leaving Claire and Agarte trapped in each other's bodies.

After reviving the Sacred Beasts, the hatred is purged, but the racial tensions remain. Veigue begins to have difficulty in dealing with Claire's condition, and his cold attitude causes her to leave with Milhaust. Eventually, Veigue opens up to the rest of the group and overcomes his difficulties. As the continuing negative feelings of Karegia's population are starting to damage the world, the group decide to revive Geyorkias again and bring him round to their way of thinking. At Geyorkias' resting place, Zilva appears and reveals herself as the mastermind behind the incidents, declaring that she will use Geyorkias to destroy the Humas and create a Gajuma-ruled kingdom. After her defeat, the party revive Geyorkias: he in turn reveals that the force influencing Zilva and spreading hatred was in fact Yuris, and that Yuris has become a threat to the world. The group travel to confront Yuris, but are initially sapped of strength by its negative emotions. The growing positive emotions of the people of Karegia as the racial disputes fade give them the strength to destroy Yuris' core. Agarte then recovers her Force, returns herself and Claire to their original bodies, and summons the Sacred Beasts to destroy Yuris. The effort costs Agarte her life, and she leaves Karegia in Milhaust's charge and reveals her love for him before dying. The group then go their separate ways to resolve the remaining conflicts in the land.

== Development ==
Tales of Rebirth was developed by Team Destiny, a section of Namco Tales Studio devoted to 2D Tales titles. It began production in 2003. The development team, led by series producer Makoto Yoshizumi, was the same team behind Tales of Destiny 2. Much of the technology from Destiny 2 was carried over to Rebirth. Mutsumi Inomata, a noted anime artist who had previously worked on Tales of Destiny, returned to design the main characters for Rebirth. She worked closely with Yoshizumi to create the designs, with each being representative of the characters' backgrounds and experiences: for instance, Veigue's clothing was made navy blue to emphasize his unsociable demeanor. Her Gajuma designs started with a basic human sketch, which was then embellished with animal features and faces. The majority of Rebirth's story and script was written by Hiramatsu Masaki. The main theme was the issue of coexistence between different races, with the representation of the theme being the conflict between Huma and Gajuma. The Gajuma were created to heighten the sense of contrast for players. The game's title "Rebirth", was meant to represent the rebirth and reconstruction of harmonious relations between different peoples. Ethnic conflict, another prominent theme, was inspired by the predominant ethnic conflicts in Yugoslavia at the time the game was being made. Prior to the main script writing stage, Yoshizumi conceived the basic set-up and story for the game. The final script ended up being substantially larger than that of Symphonia, covering four full script books. As with other Tales titles, Rebirth was given a characteristic genre name: the title was Kimi ga umarekawaru RPG (君が生まれ変わるRPG, lit. RPG Where You Will Be Reborn). The game's anime cutscenes were created by Production I.G.

Rebirth was officially announced in April 2004, a week after the game's title and existence had been leaked to the public early after a story from Jump magazine was made available a week early due to mistakenly being shipped early. In July, Namco announced that people who pre-ordered Tales of Symphonia for the PlayStation 2 would receive a bonus disc featuring footage from an early build of Tales of Rebirth, upon purchasing Symphonia in September. The same footage, along with a playable build of the game was present at the Tokyo Game Show in the same month. The game was released on the PlayStation 2 on December 16, 2004. In July 2004, IGN reported that Tales of Rebirth was a likely candidate for an English localization in North America due to the positive reception and sales of Tales of Symphonia in North America for the GameCube. The PlayStation Portable port of the game, which featured graphical adjustments for the platform's widescreen, was announced in July 2007. The port was made following the port of Destiny 2. As with those games, transplanting the 2D graphics onto the PSP and maintaining the experience of the original caused some difficulties. Conversely, they found the memory capacity of the PSP compared to the PS2 a good thing. Yoshizumi felt that the fact that it was a port rather than a remake divided the development team. The port also included extra minor story scenes and a viewing gallery for concept art. Neither the original nor the port of Rebirth has received an English localization, making it one of three mainline Tales titles to not have come to the west. The original version of Rebirth received a full fan translation in December 2024, which was later finished in October 2025.

=== Audio ===
Rebirth's soundtrack was composed by Motoi Sakuraba and Shinji Tamura, regular composers for the Tales series. The soundtrack was released as an album, Tales of Rebirth Original Soundtrack (ティルズ オブ リバース オリジナル・サウンドトラック), on January 26, 2005. Reception of the album has been mixed to positive. Patrick Gann of RPGFan said that fans of previous Tales soundtracks would enjoy it, though personally found it tiring due to similarity to previous Tales soundtracks. The reviewer for Game-OST was generally positive, calling it one of the best albums of the series and better listening outside the context of the game than previous albums, though stated that despite some improvements, it did little to improve on previous Tales scores. As with previous Tales games, a licensed theme song was used for the opening. For Rebirth, the theme song used was "Good Night", a 2004 single by Japanese pop band Every Little Thing. The song was released on 27 December 2004, shortly after the game's release, on a CD single also containing "Koibumi" (恋文; "Love Letter"). The single reached 1# on the Oricon charts and remained in the charts for nineteen weeks.

== Reception ==
Reception

Review scores
Publication	Score
Famitsu	32/40
RPGFan	92%

Awards
Publication	Award
CESA Game Awards 2005	Future Game Award
PlayStation Awards 2005	Gold Award

Namco planned for high sales for Rebirth, preparing shipments of the game totaling 700,000 units. By January 2005, a month after release, Rebirth had sold 546,726 units. As of December 2007, the game has sold 605,000 units. The game was among those which won the "Future Game" award at the 2005 CESA Game Awards, and later was given a "Gold" award, received for shipping over 500,000 units, at the PlayStation Awards 2005. The PSP port sold 46,719 copies at release, reaching 6th place in the Japanese sales charts. The port went on to sell 83,016 copies by the end of 2008. Gaming magazine Famitsu received a score of 32/40, with the four reviewers each giving it a score of 8. The reviewers were generally positive about the gameplay, and one of them commented on enjoying the story.

Western gaming sites have also been very positive. Andrew Alfonso of IGN, reporting on the TGS 2004 demo, called the battle system "very fun", and was generally impressed with the visual style with the exception of the world map. His main faults with the game were recurring issues with AI controls seen in previous games, but he made allowances for the fact that the version tested was a demo build. Anoop Gantayat, also writing for IGN when the game was released, was also impressed by the game, citing how quickly the game brought players into the action and how the battle mechanics had been improved over those in Destiny. GameSpy's Heidi Kemps was favorably impressed by the game, but had reservations as to whether it could improve on Symphonia. Siliconera writer Rolando, writing after the announcement of the PSP port, praised the game's ability to straddle the line between old and new, stating "this Tales really is a good Tales game that, while retaining a somewhat oldschool Tales charm, manages to reinvent the original formula and introduce a ton of good ideas that worked in your favor and made character customization fun." RPGFan writer Zain was highly positive about the game: he cited the graphics as beautiful barring a few reservations about dungeons and the overworld map, praised the voice acting, and was generally positive about the story and characters. He also commented that the game was easier than previous Tales titles, and ended by calling it "one of the strongest games of this hardware generation, if not of all time."

=== Additional media ===
Rebirth has been adapted into multiple media since its release. It inspired a five volume book series, released from February until November 2005. Guidebooks and art books have also been released for the title. It also inspired a manga retelling of the story, published through 2005. The comics were collected into two anthologies released on April 25 and May 27, 2005 respectively. The story was also adapted into a CD audio drama series, released in four parts between October 2005 and February 2006 under the umbrella title Teiruzu Obu Ribāsu Dorama CD (テイルズ オブ リバースドラマCD, lit. Tales of Rebirth Drama CD). To commemorate the PSP port, a new audio drama, titled Doramachikku DVD Pīchipai-hen (ドラマチック DVD ピーチパイ編, lit. Dramatic DVD Peach Pie Edition), was created. It was released as a limited pre-order addition, and contained voice actor interviews and stage videos from Jump Festa 2008.
