= Dino Land =

1991 video game

- North American cover art
- Developer: Wolf Team
- Publishers: JP: Wolf Team; NA: Renovation Products
- Composer: Ichiro Hada
- Platforms: Genesis; X68000
- Release: JP: August 2, 1991; NA: September 1991
- Genre: Pinball
- Mode: Single-player

Dino Land (超闘竜烈伝ディノランド; "Retsuden Super Dino Land") is a 1991 pinball video game developed by Wolf Team for the Sega Genesis and X68000 home computer.

== Gameplay ==
The player plays a character called Dino-Bunz to rescue his "sweetheart" Meeshell. Dino-Bunz curls himself into a ball for the player to fling at his enemies. The game is played across three pinball tables, starting with the "Earth" table, and progressing to the "Sea" and "Sky" tables. These tables have multiple areas. Each of these tables has a boss and during these stages the player can uncurl and walk around the table. The game also has some hidden levels. A slot machine is included on one of the tables.

== Release and development ==
Dino Land is the first pinball video game released for the Genesis.

In 2022 the game was released as part of the Renovation Collection 1 cartridge for the Evercade. This was the first time the games release included Europe.

An updated version was released in 2025 for Windows, Nintendo Switch, Xbox One, Xbox Series X/S, PS4, and PS5. This was one of 9 games licensed by Edia to Shinyuden and announced in January 2025. Additional features of this version include rewind, save states, and screen filters to modify the look of the game.

== Reception ==
Reception

Review scores
Publication	Score
Console XS	63%
Games-X	39/60
MegaTech	53%

MegaTech criticized the physics of ball movement as "jerky" and unrealistic, and called the game "jolly", but fairly unchallenging. The review also mentions that fans of pinball should look out for Devil's Crush which was "miles better". Console XS recommended avoiding it due to the poor scrolling and simple gameplay. Games-X praised the guardian boss as "a unique idea for this genre of game", but found it to be too expensive.

Retro Gamer in 2017 said it made a good "second string alternative" to Alien Crush and Devil's Crush.

Reviewing the Renovation Collection 1, Mike Diver found Dino Land to be suitable for short bursts, but compared it unfavourably to Psycho Pinball.
