= Hiōden: Mamono-tachi tono Chikai =

1992 video game

- Cover art of Hiōden: Mamono-tachi tono Chikai
- Developer: Wolfteam
- Publisher: Telenet Japan
- Composers: Motoi Sakuraba; Hiroya Hatsushiba; Shinji Tamura
- Platforms: PC-98, Super Famicom
- Release: PC-98: JP: June 26, 1992; SNES: JP: February 11, 1994
- Genre: Role-playing video game
- Mode: Single-player

Hiōden: Mamono-tachi tono Chikai (緋王伝(ひおうでん) 魔物達との誓い) is a video game that was published in 1992 by Telenet Japan and developed by their Wolfteam subsidiary. It was released on the NEC PC-98 in the same year. The game was later ported to the Super Famicom in 1994. Its subtitle could be translated as "Legend of the Scarlet King".

The game can be played using the SNES mouse or a normal controller.

== Plot ==
The main character of Hiouden is Richard A. MacIntyre, the titular Scarlet King. His castle has been taken over by the Macaulays, and everyone in the castle was executed except him. He fled to the hanging gardens in the castle to regroup. There he discovers Beatrix, a dryad, who grants him the ability to summon demons. Thus begins his quest to retake his home.

== Music ==
The game's music was composed by Motoi Sakuraba, Hiroya Hatsushiba and Shinji Tamura. Hatsushiba was also the sound programmer.

== Reception ==
Reception

Review score
Publication	Score
Famitsu	8/10, 8/10, 7/10, 6/10 (SFC)

According to Telenet, the game's PC-98 version became a best seller in June 1992.
