= Namco Tales Studio =

Video game developer

Namco Tales Studio Ltd.
- Native name: 株式会社ナムコテイルズスタジオ
- Romanized name: Kabushiki gaisha Namuko Teiruzu Sutajio
- Company type: Subsidiary
- Industry: Video games
- Founded: 1986; 40 years ago
- Defunct: January 1, 2012; 14 years ago
- Fate: Merged with Namco Bandai Games
- Headquarters: Tokyo, Japan
- Key people: Eiji Kikuchi
- Products: Tales series
- Parent: Telenet Japan; (1986—2003); Namco; (2003—2006); Namco Bandai Games; (2006—2011)
- Website: namco-talesstudio.co.jp

Namco Tales Studio Ltd. (Note: Japanese: 株式会社ナムコ・テイルズスタジオ, Hepburn: Kabushiki gaisha Namuko Teiruzu Sutajio), formerly known as Wolf Team ((株)ウルフチーム, Urufu Chīmu), was a Japanese video game development company founded in 1986. The company was renamed in 2003 when Telenet Japan sold part of its stake and made Namco the majority shareholder. Namco Tales Studio was originally the primary developer of the Tales RPG series, as it had been since the series' beginning. In November 2011, it was announced that the current Tales Studio would be dissolved and would merge with their publisher, Namco Bandai Games. In February 2012, it was announced that the 80 people of the Tales team would join Bandai Namco Studios.

== History ==
Originally headed by Masahiro Akishino, Wolf Team became independent from Telenet in 1987, was reintegrated in 1990 and got merged with another Telenet subsidiary called Lasersoft, then was completely absorbed in an internal restructuring at Telenet in 1993 at which point most of the staff left together with Akishino.

The remaining staff were the then-very-young programmer Yoshiharu Gotanda, designer Masaki Norimoto, director Joe Asanuma, graphic artist Yoshiaki Inagaki, sound composer Motoi Sakuraba, and sound effect designer Ryota Furuya. Wolf Team went on to create games such as Sol-Feace and Hiouden: Mamono-tachi tono Chikai, which faced weak sales. They were also notable for porting laserdisc video games to the Sega Mega-CD, including some Japan-only arcades like Time Gal and Ninja Hayate (released as Revenge of the Ninja for the Sega Mega-CD outside Japan).

For Tale Phantasia, a game concept by Gotanda, they looked for an outside publisher with a better reputation. After approaching Enix, Telenet struck a contract with Namco. Namco insisted on many changes to the game, including changing the title to Tales of Phantasia. The conflict over these changes pushed the game's release from 1994 into late 1995. Most of the initial staff left during this dispute and founded tri-Ace in early 1995.

To continue the lucrative arrangement with Namco to develop the Tales series, Telenet re-staffed Wolf Team and retained some other staff, such as Motoi Sakuraba on a freelance basis. Wolf Team dedicated itself to the series, developing or co-developing nearly every game. In 2003, Namco assumed majority ownership of the company and renamed it Namco Tales Studio.

At the time of its renaming Namco owned 60% of this venture, Telenet Japan/Kazuyuki Fukushima retained 34%, and Tales series director Eiji Kikuchi received 6%. (Kikuchi, who was the head of Telenet's game development department for 10 years, left Telenet to head the new team full-time.) Effective on April 1, 2006, the then-newly merged Bandai Namco Holdings bought the remaining shares from Telenet Japan, cutting the last link to the developers' former employer and increasing its stockholding majority to 94%. In October 2007, Telenet filed for bankruptcy and closed, putting an end to the Wolf Team name. Namco later acquired the remaining shares.

Namco Tales Studios remained the primary developer of the so-called "mothership" titles of the Tales series, with the exception of Tales of Legendia and Tales of Innocence. Legendia was developed by an internal Namco development team called Team Melfes; while Innocence was developed by an independent developer, Alfa System, which also developed various spinoff games in the Tales series.

In November 2011, it was announced that the current Tales Studio would be dissolved and would merge with their publisher, Namco Bandai Games. In February 2012, it was announced that the 80 people of the Tales team would join Bandai Namco Studios.

== Developed games ==
Namco Tales Studio has developed games for the GameCube, PlayStation, Game Boy Advance, PlayStation 2, PlayStation Portable, Nintendo DS, Nintendo 3DS, Wii, Xbox 360, and PlayStation 3.

Game	Release date	Platform
Tales of Phantasia	1995	Super NES
Tales of Destiny	1997	PlayStation
Tales of Eternia	2000	PlayStation
Tales of Destiny 2	2002	PlayStation 2
Tales of Symphonia	2003	GameCube
Tales of Tactics	2004	FOMA 900i
Tales of Rebirth	2004	PlayStation 2, PlayStation Portable
Tales of Breaker	2005	FOMA 900i
Tales of Commons	2005	FOMA 900i
Tales of the Abyss	2005	PlayStation 2
Tales of Wahrheit	2006	FOMA 900i
Tales of Destiny Remake	2006	PlayStation 2
Tales of the World: Material Dungeon	2008	FOMA 900i
Tales of Destiny Director's Cut	2008	PlayStation 2
Tales of Symphonia: Dawn of the New World	2008	Wii
Tales of Vesperia	2008	Xbox 360, PlayStation 3
Tales of Hearts	2008	Nintendo DS
Tales of Graces	2009	Wii
Keroro RPG: Kishi to Musha to Densetsu no Kaizoku^{[1]}	2010	Nintendo DS
Tales of Phantasia: Narikiri Dungeon X	2010	PlayStation Portable
Tales of Graces F	2010	PlayStation 3
Tales of Xillia	2011	PlayStation 3

Notes: ^{1} Tales Studio sound staff only

For a complete list of Tales of games, see Tales (video game series).

=== As Wolf Team ===
- Aisle Lord
- Anett Futatabi
- Arcus
- Arcus II: Silent Symphony
- Arcus 3
- Arcus Odyssey
- Akushu: Kagerou no Jidai wo Koe te
- Apros: Daichi no Shou Kaze no Tankyuu Sha hen
- Cliff Hanger
- Cobra Command
- Crystal Chaser: Tenkuu no Masuishou
- D: European Mirage
- Daitoua Mokujiroku Goh
- Diamond Players
- Devastator
- Dino Land
- Earnest Evans
- El Viento
- Fhey Area
- Final Zone (FZ Senki AXIS)
- Gaudi: Barcelona no Kaze
- Granada
- Goh 2
- Gulf War Soukouden
- Hiōden
- Hiōden 2
- Hiōden: Mamono-tachi tono Chikai
- Jinmu Denshou
- Mid-Garts
- Niko^2
- Revenge of the Ninja
- Road Blaster
- Ryū: Naki no Ryū Yori
- Seirei Shinseiki - Fhey Area
- Shinsengumi: Bakumatsu Genshikou
- Sol-Feace/Sol-Deace
- Span of Dream
- Suzaku
- Tales of Destiny
- Tales of Destiny 2
- Tales of Eternia
- Tales of Phantasia
- Tales of Phantasia: Narikiri Dungeon
- Tales of the World: Narikiri Dungeon 2
- Tenbu Limited / Mankan Zenseki
- Tenbu: Sangokushi Seishi
- The Grail Hunter
- The Journey Home: Quest for the Throne
- Tokyo Twilight Busters
- Time Gal
- Valis: The Fantasm Soldier
- Yaksa
- Zan: Kagerou no Toki
- Zan: Yasha Enbukyoku
- Zan II: Spirits
- Zan 2: Kagerou no Jidai
- Zan 2: Kagerou no Jidai Soshuhen
- Zan 3: Tenun Ware ni Ari
- Zan Gear
