= Tales (video game series) =

Role-playing video game series

- The Tales of series logo, used during the series' 25th and 30th anniversaries. Each entry in the series uses its own font and styling.
- Genre: Action role-playing game
- Developers: Namco Tales Studio (formerly Wolf Team) (1995–2011); Bandai Namco Studios (2012–present)
- Publisher: Bandai Namco Entertainment
- Creator: Yoshiharu Gotanda
- Artists: Mutsumi Inomata; Kōsuke Fujishima; Daigo Okumura; Minoru Iwamoto
- Composer: Motoi Sakuraba
- Platforms: Android; Game Boy Advance; Game Boy Color; GameCube; iOS; Mobile phone; Windows; Nintendo DS; Nintendo 3DS; Nintendo Switch; Nintendo Switch 2; PlayStation; PlayStation 2; PlayStation 3; PlayStation 4; PlayStation 5; PlayStation Portable; PlayStation Vita; Super Famicom; Web Browser; Wii; Xbox 360; Xbox One; Xbox Series X/S
- First release: Tales of Phantasia; December 15, 1995
- Latest release: Tales of Eternia Remastered; October 16, 2026

The Tales series (Note: Known in Japan as the Tales of series (Japanese: 「テイルズ オブ」シリーズ, Hepburn: "Teiruzu Obu" Shirīzu)) is a franchise of fantasy role-playing video games published by Bandai Namco Entertainment (formerly Namco), and developed by its subsidiary, Namco Tales Studio until 2011 and presently by Bandai Namco Studios. First begun in 1995 with the development and release of Tales of Phantasia for the Super Famicom, the series currently spans 17 main titles, multiple spin-off games and supplementary media in the form of manga series, anime series, and audio dramas.

While entries in the series generally stand independent of each other with different characters and stories, they are commonly linked by their gameplay, themes and high fantasy settings. The series is characterized by its art style, which draws from Japanese manga and anime, and its action-based fighting system called the "Linear Motion Battle System". Multiple people have become linked with the series, including character designers Kōsuke Fujishima and Mutsumi Inomata, producers Hideo Baba and Makoto Yoshizumi, and composer Motoi Sakuraba. The series was created by Yoshiharu Gotanda.

Most of the main Tales games have been localized for North America and Europe, although almost none of the spinoff titles have been released abroad. While generally seen as a niche series in English-speaking regions, Tales is considered to be among the most important JRPG franchises in Japan. The series has been gaining popularity in the West since the release of Tales of Symphonia, which is still considered one of its most popular games. As of 2024, the series has shipped over 30 million copies.

== Titles ==
=== Games ===
Since the first installment was released in 1995, the Tales series has grown to include the main entries and multiple spin-offs that derive multiple gameplay and narrative elements from the main entries. Except when indicated by naming, the main Tales entries are separate from each other apart from gameplay mechanics and themes. While Tales titles are often ported to new consoles after their original release, these remakes are rarely localized.

==== Main series ====
Release timeline
1995	Tales of Phantasia
1996
1997	Tales of Destiny
1998–1999
2000	Tales of Eternia
2001
2002	Tales of Destiny 2
2003	Tales of Symphonia
2004	Tales of Rebirth
2005	Tales of Legendia
2005	Tales of the Abyss
2006
2007	Tales of Innocence
2008	Tales of Vesperia
2008	Tales of Hearts
2009	Tales of Graces
2010
2011	Tales of Xillia
2012	Tales of Xillia 2
2013–2014
2015	Tales of Zestiria
2016	Tales of Berseria
2017–2020
2021	Tales of Arise

Seventeen main entries have been released to date. The series debuted on the Super Famicom with Tales of Phantasia in 1995, and introduced multiple elements that would become staples of the Tales series. It was released in the West on the Game Boy Advance in 2006. It was also ported to the PlayStation, PlayStation Portable and iOS. The PlayStation received two original Tales games: Tales of Destiny in 1997, which was the first title to be released in North America, and Tales of Eternia in 2000, which was released in North America as Tales of Destiny 2 in 2001.

Five titles were released on the PlayStation 2. The true direct sequel to Destiny, Tales of Destiny 2, was released on the PlayStation 2 in 2001 across Asian territories and ported to the PlayStation Portable in Japan in 2007; both versions have yet to receive a Western release. Tales of Symphonia was released in Japan on the PS2 and GameCube. The GameCube version was also released in North America and Europe. It was the first entry to feature 3D graphics for its characters and environments and the first to be released in Europe. Tales of Rebirth was released in 2004 and ported to the PlayStation Portable in 2008, but has not yet received a Western localization. Tales of Legendia and Tales of the Abyss were both released in Japan in 2005, with both being released in North America the following year. Legendia was the first and only Tales game developed by Namco internal development team "Project Melfes", while Abyss was developed by the same team that developed Symphonia, and used its same graphics engine. Abyss was later ported to the Nintendo 3DS and released in Japan, North America and Europe.

Tales of Innocence was the next game released in Japan on the Nintendo DS in 2007. A remake of the game, Innocence R was released on the PlayStation Vita in 2012. Neither version has been released in the West. The first release on seventh-generation consoles, Tales of Vesperia for Xbox 360, was released in Japan and North America in 2008 and in Europe in 2009. A Japan-exclusive PlayStation 3 port with updated content was released in 2009, which became available worldwide in 2019 with the remastered Definitive Edition on PlayStation 4, Microsoft Windows, Xbox One and Nintendo Switch. Tales of Hearts was released on the Nintendo DS in 2008. A remake, Hearts R, was released in 2013 in Japan and 2014 in North America and Europe.

The twelfth entry, Tales of Graces, released on the Wii in Japan in 2009. A PlayStation 3 port, Graces f, was released in 2010 in Japan, and in 2012 in North America and Europe. Tales of Xillia, the series' 15th anniversary title, was released in Japan for PlayStation 3 in 2011, and in North America and Europe in 2013. Xillia's direct sequel and the fourteenth main title, Tales of Xillia 2, was released in 2012 in Japan and 2014 in North America and Europe. The series' 20th anniversary title, Tales of Zestiria, was released in January 2015 in Japan and worldwide in October 2015, for PS3, PS4 and PC. The sixteenth main title, Tales of Berseria, was released in Japan for PS3 and PS4 in August 2016, and worldwide for PS4 and PC in January 2017.

Tales of Arise, designed as a departure from series conventions, was originally set to release in 2020 for Windows, PlayStation 4 and Xbox One, but was delayed to September 2021 due to internal issues and the desire to launch the game on PlayStation 5 and Xbox Series X/S as well. A story DLC expansion - Tales of Arise - Beyond the Dawn - was released in 2023. A Nintendo Switch 2 version with the DLC included was released in May 2026. A new entry in the franchise is currently in development, though no name or release window has been announced.

==== Sequels and spin-offs ====
As the Tales series grew, games became categorised under certain branches: "Mothership" for main titles, "Escort" for spin-offs, and "Mobile" for games release for mobile phones. In 2020, a different internal organization scheme was announced; "Original" for games featuring new stories as well as their sequels, and "Crossover" for secondary entries drawing characters and worlds from various past titles.

The series has received a small number of sequels, and a large number of spin-off titles and subseries. These games are derivative rather than original works. Three direct sequels have been produced: Destiny 2, Xillia 2 and Tales of Symphonia: Dawn of the New World. Eternia received an MMORPG spin-off for Microsoft Windows titled Tales of Eternia Online. Multiple games have been made for mobile platforms, including the Tales of Mobile series, Tales of Kizna (released on mobile on November 22, 2011; ended service on September 25, 2014), Tales of Card Evolve (released on mobile on June 3, 2012; ended service on September 30, 2014), Tales of Link (released in Japan on iOS on March 3 and on Android on April 23, 2014; in North America on April 5, 2016; ended service on March 28, 2018) and Tales of Asteria (released on Android on April 4 and on iOS on April 23, 2014; ended service on May 18, 2023). Two titles for the PlayStation Portable have been released in Japan: Tales of VS. in 2009, and Tales of the Heroes: Twin Brave in 2012. The main spin-off subseries is Tales of the World, which has grown to include ten games beginning with Tales of Phantasia: Narikiri Dungeon, released in Japan on the Game Boy Color in 2000. Only Tales of the World: Radiant Mythology has been released in the West. A second subseries, Tales of Fandom, consists of two puzzle-adventure games released respectively for the PlayStation and PlayStation 2 in 2002 and 2007. On February 28, 2017, they had released another mobile Tales game called Tales of the Rays in Japan and worldwide on July 24, 2017. On March 28, 2018, however, Tales of Link ended their service, and a day after the closure, they announced the global version of Tales of the Rays would end their service as well on May 29, 2018, with its Japanese version shutting down on July 23, 2024. Tales of Crestoria, another mobile game, was released on July 16, 2020. It ended service on February 7, 2022. Tales of Luminaria, the latest part of the Tales series, was released on November 3, 2021. The game was discontinued on July 19, 2022.

The 2006 Nintendo DS game Tales of the Tempest was originally seen as a main entry in the series, but in 2007 was classified as a spin-off, possibly due to poor reception of that particular title.

==== Remaster project ====
After a remastered version of Tales of Symphonia was released on February 17, 2023, Bandai Namco expressed interest in remastering other games in the series. As part of the series 30th anniversary in 2025, Bandai Namco announced the "Tales Remaster Project" - an effort to start making more previous Tales titles available on modern video game platforms. The project aims to release remasters more quickly and frequently than in the past. The first entry in the project, Tales of Graces f Remastered, was released in January 2025. The second entry, Tales of Xillia Remastered, was released in October 2025. In that same month, Famitsu reported that a remaster of Tales of Xillia 2 was in development. The third entry in the project, Tales of Berseria Remastered, was released in February 2026. Older entries in the franchise are set to be announced for remasters in 2026 as well. The fourth entry, Tales of Eternia Remastered version is set to release on October 16, 2026.

=== Related media ===
The Tales series has expanded into other media, including CD dramas, manga and anime. Multiple Tales games have been adapted into anime OVAs and TV series. The Symphonia OVA was released in three parts between 2007 and 2011, and released as a single collection in 2013. Abyss was adapted into a 26-episode TV series between October 2008 and March 2009. Phantasia and Eternia have also received anime adaptations. The series' first theatrical film, a prequel to Vesperia called Tales of Vesperia: The First Strike, was released in 2009 in Japan and 2012 in North America. A made-for-television anime based on the opening sections of Zestiria, Dawn of the Shepherd, was produced as part of the 20th anniversary celebrations related to the title. It was also released on the game disc. A full series based on Zestiria began airing in July 2016.

Books and audio dramas have also been made. Phantasia received multiple CD dramas, including four collected into anthologies in January and March 2000. and a stand-alone drama in December 2001. Symphonia received seven audio dramas. Two CD dramas for Legendia were respectively released in August and September 2005. A manga of Phantasia was written and serialized in 2008 and 2009, while Abyss received three manga adaptations in the years after its release. Symphonia was adapted into novelizations and a manga serial. Destiny, Graces and Xillia also received adaptations of these kinds.

== Common elements ==
=== Gameplay ===
The Tales series is classified as a role-playing video game series. Multiple gameplay elements carry over from entry to entry. The main unifying element is the combat system, the Linear Motion Battle System (LMBS for short). Considered one of the mainstays and building blocks for every main entry in the series, it undergoes multiple incremental changes and alterations from one installment to the next. Introduced in Phantasia, it is a real-time fighting system similar to a brawler, as opposed to the majority of RPGs at the time of Phantasia's release, which primarily used turn-based battle systems.

Some features introduced in certain games have proven popular enough to remain in future installments like "Free Running" (the ability for a character to freely roam the battlefield). Elements of turn-based combat are also present, though to a lesser degree: an example of this is Destiny's "Chain Capacity" feature (the number of skills a character can perform), which appears in later games in the series. The battle system for Legendia was deliberately designed to be similar to a brawler: the stated reason was that the team wished to combine brawler combat with the story and leveling mechanics of a Tales game. Characters generally use Artes, which are special attacks characters can perform in battle. Players can usually only control one character, though a multiplayer option was implemented for Destiny and has reappeared in later Tales games.

The battle system's name for each installment is augmented with descriptive titles representative of features of that game's battle system: examples are the "Style Shift" system from Graces (characters shifting between two types of Artes) and the "Fusionic-Chain" system from Zestiria (a human character merging with a magical character for a brief period to deal greater damage, termed in-game as Armatization). Characters are awarded with "Titles", nicknames that sometimes grant benefits to them in battle when assigned to them. In the majority of previous Tales games, when navigating the overworld or environment and encountering an enemy, combat took place on a separate battle screen. From Zestiria onwards, combat took place in the same space as exploration.

Most Tales games have skits, side conversations between different characters that can be both dramatic and comedic in nature. They are commonly portrayed as character portraits or profiles, with text along the bottom of the screen. They were first introduced in Tales of Destiny, though the majority were cut from the English release. In the original English GameCube release of Symphonia, the voice track for the skits was removed, but for its HD re-release, the Japanese voice track, and consequently the skit voice tracks, were included. Developers noted that English voices for skits were not included in Symphonia and Abyss due to time constraints, but later entries, such as Vesperia, would include English voiced skits. Another recurring feature is the Cooking system, where characters learn and prepare dishes to restore health and forms of experience points. In Tales of Crestoria, unlike the previous titles, the combat system is a turn-based RPG, which is very rare in the series.

=== Themes, plots and characters ===
The prominent narrative theme of the Tales series is the issue of coexistence between different races. A particular example of this is Tales of Rebirth, which extensively explores themes of racism. Scenario writer Hiramatsu Masaki was inspired by the ethnic conflicts seen in Yugoslavia. Another recurring feature is the plot and characters, which are often rooted in and revolve around themes such as justice or faith. The theme for each entry in the series is decided by the series producer based on current world events. The chosen theme helps dictate what the game will be called: once the theme is decided, the team search through various languages to find a suitable representative word. The narratives of each story were described by Gamasutra as "very typical" during a 2008 interview with staff members, although it was not elaborated upon by the interviewer. The interviewers suggested that this point of view was based on the fact that Western fans were not generally experienced in Japanese culture, and so would see the stories in each entry as similar. The writers for each game are hired on a per-project basis, with both freelancers and in-house story writers being involved. Two of the recurring writers are Takumi Miyajima (Symphonia and Abyss), and Naoki Yamamoto (Hearts, Xillia, Zestiria). There are very few mainline games that share a setting: Symphonia takes place along the same "time axis" as Phantasia, while Zestiria and Berseria take place on the same world at different time periods.

The settings for the stories are primarily high fantasy worlds, with the producers opting not to use a dark or science fiction-based setting. An exception is Xillia 2, which mostly took place in a modern setting, and explored darker themes than usual. This direction was confirmed as a one-off experiment for the series. The main characters play a key role in the Tales games, as it is partially through them that the main theme of each entry is depicted. For Abyss, it was decided to take a risk and create an unorthodox protagonist that would be initially unlikable. For Vesperia, the team opted to raise the age limit of the target audience, showing this in the game by making the main protagonist a more mature type. A female main protagonist was included for the first time in Xillia in the form of Milla Maxwell alongside male protagonist Jude Mathis, although at the time it was stated that there were no solid plans to create a game with a single female protagonist. A sole main female character, called Velvet, was eventually included in Berseria. The way the characters interact with each other during the narrative forms one of the core aspects of designing each game. Another main priority is for players to see a part of themselves in the characters.

=== Terminology ===
Unique terminology is used when referring to games within the series. In 2007, Yoshizumi announced two classes of Tales games, "Mothership Titles" and "Escort Titles". "Mothership" essentially means "Main series", where as "Escort" essentially means "Spinoff". One of the recurring differences between the two game types internally is that "Escort" titles don't supply inspiration for main entries in the series, but draw the most popular elements from them. The games are also frequently given what is called a "Characteristic Genre Name", which is essentially a short subtitle or phrase that outlines the game's overall theme. The main reason for this, as stated by Yoshizumi, was that the series was not seen as a role-playing series by the development team, but rather "Character Playing Game", with the player learning about the game's characters and watching them grow rather than using them as avatars: the genre names are meant to distinguish them from other role-playing games. The terms, however, are largely removed from the English localized versions. There are also terms that are used in remakes or ports of games: "R" stands for "remake" or "Re-imagination" (as in Hearts R), while "F" in Graces f stood for "future", in reference to the game's extra story content.

== Development ==
=== History ===
The Tales series originated when Phantasia began production, based on an unpublished novel titled Tale Phantasia, (Note: Tale Phantasia (テイルファンタジア, Teiru Fantajia)) written by the game's scenario writer and lead programmer Yoshiharu Gotanda. During the story development process, several elements of the original novel were dropped or changed. The game was developed by Wolf Team, an independent game development studio founded in 1986. Due to bad experiences at Telenet Japan, the previous employer of multiple Wolf Team members, the staff sought an independent publisher for the game. After an unsuccessful pitch to Enix, they entered a publishing contract with Bandai Namco (then Namco). Phantasia had a troubled development cycle for the original Super Famicom version, with many creative disagreements between Wolf Team and Namco. The disagreements led to most of the Wolf Team staff leaving after the game in order to start a new company, tri-Ace, which would go on to make the Star Ocean series. Remaining members would continue to develop games in the Tales series.

The studio remained independent until 2003, when it was acquired by Bandai Namco and renamed Namco Tales Studio. The studio's shares were divided between Bandai Namco, Telenet Japan and series director Eiji Kikuchi. In 2006, Namco bought Telenet's shares, then later Kikuchi's, giving them full control over the studio. In mid 2011, a financial report indicated that Namco Tales was in serious financial trouble, having a debt of 21 million dollars and posting a loss for the previous financial year. The studio's absorption into its parent company was formally announced in November of that year. After the absorption of Namco Tales, former series brand manager Hideo Baba was appointed as series producer. He had previously been the producer of the original version of Hearts. Alongside Baba, the chief series producer is Makoto Yoshizumi, who had produced multiple titles including Destiny and Innocence.

=== Art design ===
The series is distinguished by its art style, which emulates manga and anime. According to Baba, the character designs are created once the main character's story, personality, and environment are determined by the rest of the production team. Beyond that, the artist is allowed to use their imagination, though they can be asked to alter things like costume details, and facial expressions. One of the main designers for the series is manga artist Kōsuke Fujishima. He was first brought in to design the characters for Phantasia, and has since designed for multiple entries including Abyss and Xillia. Another designer, Mutsumi Inomata, first designed for the series with Destiny, and has contributed designs for multiple entries including Eternia, Rebirth and Xillia. A third regular artist is Daigo Okumura, who designed characters for Vesperia and Xillia 2, as well as Dawn of the New World. Other designers to work on the series include Kazuto Nakazawa (Legendia), Kouichi Kimura (Xillia 2), and Minoru Iwamoto (Zestiria). The art design for each game's world and characters has ranged between a cel-shaded anime style (Vesperia) to a more realistic style (Xillia 2). Skit character images are also directly inspired by anime art. The art style for each title is determined by the theme and story decided upon by the developers.

Anime cutscenes are included in each game, and are a primary focus for the production team as they help make the first impression on players. The series aims to avoid standard anime tropes and common narrative elements with each installment. The first game to feature such cutscenes was Destiny. The cutscenes were animated by Production I.G, which has provided cutscenes for the series until Xillia. For Xillia, aiming to demonstrate a new artistic direction for the series, production of the anime cutscenes was given to Ufotable. For the Nintendo DS release of Hearts, two identical versions of the game were released as an experiment by the production team, with one featuring traditional anime animation by Production I.G., and one featuring computer-generated cutscenes by Shirogumi Ltd. The CGI cutscenes proved less popular with fans than the established anime style. For the brand new title Tales of Arise, the world design went in a darker direction compared to earlier entries, both to further the series evolution and appeal to the Western market. Despite the overt focus on 3D graphics, 2D anime cutscenes are still planned as with previous entries. Similar to the previous games in the series, the anime sequences were produced by Ufotable.

=== Technology and development teams ===
The engines for the games are generally developed in-house. The cited reasons for this included problems with outsourced development. Until Vesperia, the team worked on a by-project basis, creating new development tools and engines for each installment. Due to cost increases, the development process was altered and streamlined as more user-friendly software engines became available. The studio was divided into two teams: Team Destiny worked on 2D Tales titles such as Tales of Destiny, while Team Symphonia developed 3D titles. In-house, major distinctions were made between the two studios except for some core staff Namco Tales produced the majority of the mainline Tales games until its absorption in 2011. The notable exceptions are Legendia, which was developed by an internal staff group at Bandai Namco, and Innocence, which was developed by Alfa System. Alfa System also developed many of the portable spin-off titles. After the absorption of Namco Tales by Bandai Namco, the teams and staff transferred to the new in-house development studio called Bandai Namco Studios. The size of the teams was reduced and the previous studio's main divisions were merged. This allowed production to be streamlined, but also meant that the team could only focus on one game at a time, rather than working on two games simultaneously as they had done before.

=== Music ===
The regular main composer for the Tales series is Motoi Sakuraba. His first work on the series was for Phantasia, and has since contributed to nearly every main entry since there in the capacity of a freelance composer. Sakuraba has become noted for his signature musical style, which is present in the majority of his Tales scores. He also frequently collaborates with Shinji Tamura. The entries Sakuraba has not worked on are Legendia, which was composed by Go Shiina, an in-house composer, and Innocence, whose composer was Kazuhiro Nakamura. Sakuraba and Shiina had collaborated on the score for Zestiria. Multiple titles in the series use licensed theme songs by multiple Japanese artists: among the artists are Garnet Crow (Eternia), Deen (Destiny/Hearts), Kokia (Innocence), Ayumi Hamasaki (Xillia/Xillia 2) and FLOW (Berseria). One recurring aspect of many earlier localizations was the removal of the Japanese theme song, such as with Symphonia, which had its theme song replaced with an orchestral version. The first Western release of a Tales game to feature the theme song used in Japan was Vesperia.

=== Localization ===
Multiple Tales titles, the majority of which are spin-offs, have not been localized for the West or have only been released in North America: two examples of the former case for entries in the main series are Rebirth and Innocence, while an example of the latter is Legendia. Speaking in 2013, Baba explained that the main priority for localizations was for the main series rather than spin-offs. In addition to this, he stated that their localization team was limited and they needed to "pick and choose" which game to bring to the West. For its Western release, Eternia's name was changed to "Destiny 2": this was due to a possible trademark conflict and the wish to exploit the popularity of Destiny. The 2006 PSP port of Eternia retained its original title. With Zestiria, Bandai Namco planned to attempt releasing the game in the West in the same year it was released in Japan. The deciding factor in this resolution was the delayed release of Xillia and its sequel, and the reaction of Western fans to this. Fan localizations have also been created, such as for the original versions of Phantasia and Innocence. While the option of the Japanese voice tracks have been heavily requested for Western releases by fans, licensing issues have mostly prevented Bandai Namco from implementing it. Localization for mobile titles is also a low priority due to them being co-developed by Japan-based mobile developers.

== Reception and legacy ==
The series has generally sold well during its lifetime. The series' strongest sales base has been Japan: in 2007, sales distribution was 87% in Japan, 8% in North America, 3% in Europe and 2% in mainland Asia. The best-selling titles of the series as of April 2008 were Tales of Symphonia (1.6 million copies for the GameCube and PS2), Tales of Destiny (1.534 million for PlayStation and PS2), Tales of Phantasia (1.431 million for Super Famicom, PlayStation, GBA, and PSP), Tales of Eternia (1.271 million for PlayStation and PSP), and Tales of Destiny 2 (1.106 million for PS2 and PSP), not including mobile or online games. Other titles that have since sold over 1 million copies worldwide include Tales of Vesperia (614,305 copies for the Xbox 360, 465,888 for PS3, and over 500,000 for Definitive Edition), Tales of Xillia (PS3), Tales of Berseria, and Tales of Arise. By March 2023, the series in total had shipped over 29.29 million copies. By March 2024, it had shipped 30.25 copies.

While keeping a lower profile in English-speaking regions, in Japan, it is regarded as one of the biggest role-playing video game series. 1UP.com's Jeremy Parish, speaking in 2006, referred to it as the third biggest RPG series in Japan behind Final Fantasy and Dragon Quest. Gamasutra's Brandon Sheffield echoed these sentiments, stating that "While the series doesn't have quite the cultural cache of Final Fantasy in the West or Dragon Quest in Japan, it's still a very popular brand worldwide". IGN's Anoop Gantayat additionally referred to it as the third biggest Japanese role-playing series in regards to sales. Multiple entries in the series, notably Destiny and Legendia have been favorably compared with fighting games and brawlers, especially the Street Fighter series. GameTrailers ranked the Linear Motion Battle System, with particular reference to Graces, as one of the top five JRPG battle systems. Their stories and characters have generally received a more mixed response from Western critics: opinions on entries such as Legendia, Abyss, Xillia were mixed to positive, while others such as Symphonia, Graces and Xillia 2 were criticized. The main criticism for these games and Legendia was that the story was either predictable or cliché. The in-game graphics have also drawn mixed responses for several games in the series, including Destiny, Eternia, Graces and Xillia.

In 2013, leading up to the release of Tales of Symphonia Chronicles, Baba called Symphonia the most successful title in the series in the West thus far, although the series' main target audience was still in Japan. In an earlier interview, Baba commented that the team behind the series put a large amount of effort and development in keeping the series fresh while retaining the base elements across each installment. The positive reaction of gamers in the US to Symphonia influenced the way the various teams developed titles after that point. Speaking in 2014, production manager Denis Lee said that, since Symphonia's release, the popularity of the series has grown. In response, Bandai Namco have focused on getting more entries out in Western territories. Much of their research about what titles to release or develop in the future revolves around direct conversation with Tales series fans at gaming conventions and special events.
