= Tales of Destiny 2 =

2002 video game

- Japanese PlayStation 2 cover art
- Developers: Telenet Japan, Wolf Team; Alfa System (PSP)
- Publishers: JP: Namco; AS: Sony Computer Entertainment
- Producer: Makoto Yoshizumi
- Artist: Mutsumi Inomata
- Writer: Gekko
- Composers: Motoi Sakuraba; Shinji Tamura
- Series: Tales
- Platforms: PlayStation 2 PlayStation Portable
- Release: PlayStation 2: JP: November 28, 2002; PlayStation Portable: JP: February 15, 2007
- Genre: Action role-playing game
- Modes: Single-player, multiplayer

Tales of Destiny 2 (Japanese: テイルズ オブ デスティニー 2, Hepburn: Teiruzu Obu Desutinī Tsū) is a 2002 action role-playing game, co-developed by Wolf Team and Telenet Japan, and published by Namco. It is the fourth main entry in the Tales series of video games, and a direct sequel to 1997's Tales of Destiny. It was released on PlayStation 2 in November 2002 in Japan, March 2003 in South Korea and August 2003 in Hong Kong and Taiwan. The overseas versions were published by Sony Computer Entertainment. An updated port for the PlayStation Portable, developed by Alfa System, was released in February 2007 in Japan, and March of the same year in South Korea. This version was published by Namco Bandai Games. Neither version has received a western release.

The story, set eighteen years after Destiny, follows Kyle Dunamis, the son of the previous game's protagonists Stahn Aileron and Rutee Katrea. Shortly after meeting a mysterious girl named Reala while trying to save Rutee's orphanage from bankruptcy, Kyle is drawn into conflict with Barbatos, a cruel warrior responsible for killing Stahn, and the machinations of Elraine, a religious leader seeking to bring peace to mankind. The gameplay uses two-dimensional character sprites and backgrounds, and the battle system is a revamped version of the series' trademark Linear Motion Battle System.

Development began after the release of Tales of Eternia in 2000, taking approximately two years to complete, and was the last Tales game to be developed by the original Wolf Team before it became Namco Tales Studio. The scenario was handled by Japanese writing company Gekko, the characters were designed by Mutsumi Inomata, and the music was composed by Motoi Sakuraba and Shinji Tamura. The PSP port was made after a similar port of Eternia met with commercial success. It was a highly anticipated game, and Namco promoted it heavily in the months prior to release. The game sold over 700,000 units by January 2003, and received critical acclaim from both Japanese and western critics.

== Gameplay ==
Screenshots of battle as they appear in the PlayStation 2 (top) and PlayStation Portable (bottom) versions of the game

Tales of Destiny 2 is a role-playing video game featuring two-dimensional (2D) sprite characters navigating both 2D environments such as dungeons and towns, and a three-dimensional overworld. The overworld features environmental effect such as fog. In towns found across the world, non-playable characters provide both information relevant to the story and world, and provide items and equipment through shops; merchants accept the Tales series currency, Gald, (Note: ガルド, Garudo) which can be obtained from battle or treasure chests on the dungeon and town maps.

Throughout the game, visiting certain individuals in towns will activate optional events and side-quests. Prisons, sewers, forests and story-centric locations serve as dungeon locales; these areas are scattered with treasure chests containing rare items, some of which cannot be purchased in stores. Dungeons frequently contain puzzles and mazes, such as boxes that must be reoriented to form a bridge, which must be cleared to advance; the "Sorcerer's Ring", a relic that shoots tiny plumes of fire, often plays a central role in puzzle resolution, along with the "Sorcerer's Scope", a tool that reveals hidden objects. Aspects of characters such as their current experience level, equipment and money levels, party organization, and assigned abilities. Cooking, a recurring series mechanic, is present: characters learn and cook various recipes using a selection of six ingredients which grant boons upon them such as restoring health. Optional voiced conversations between characters called Skits (Note: スクリーンチャット, Sukurīn Chatto; Screen Chat) can be activated when they appear in random locations or after story events. Mini-games within the world include acting as a waiter in a restaurant, and battle arenas where players fight against random enemies.

The game's battle system is the series' trademark Linear Motion Battle System (LMBS), which places up to four playable characters on a 2D plain against enemies in real-time combat similar to a beat 'em up. The version used in Destiny 2 is called the "Trust and Tactical LMBS". When entering battle, the camera follows characters, zooming in and out depending on their distance from an enemy. During battle, one character is controlled at any one time, with the others being governed by the game's artificial intelligence (AI): the AI can be customized to behave in various ways, such as adjusting their aggression level, and balancing magical and physical attacks. In addition to real-time commands given in battle, the player can issue commands to all characters by pulling up the battle menu and issuing commands. A character's performance in battle is governed by their current level of Spirit Points (SP): the more SP a character has, the higher their defensive and offensive abilities. A character's health is represented by Health Points (HP). Three types of attack are available and activated progressively depending on the number of hits an enemy has taken: a standard attack, named attacks called Artes, and special high-damage attacks called Mystic Artes. (Note: 秘奥義, Hi Ougi) At the end of each battle, its performance is assessed a given a Grade, which can sometimes trigger a bonus such as learning new skills. Some bonuses are also carried over into the next playthrough. In addition to the single-player functions, a local multiplayer option is available, supporting up to four players: when additional controllers with players are connected to the system, AI functions for selected characters are disabled, switching to manual control. An auto-battle option, which has the game's AI controlling all characters during a fight, is also available.

== Synopsis ==
=== Setting ===
Destiny 2 is set on an unnamed world that was struck by a comet 1000 years before, triggering a prolonged winter. Desperate for heat and energy, the people used a type of gemstone brought by the comet called Lens (Note: レンズ, Renzu) to create a floating city called Dycroft. The people of Dycroft eventually dominated the people below, which led to a conflict between the two realms known as the War of Heaven and Earth. (Note: 天地戦争, Tenchi Sensō) Eventually, a team of defecting Dycroft scientists developed sentient weapons called Swordians that turned the tide of war in the surface people's favor. This conflict reemerged eighteen years prior during the events of Tales of Destiny. The Swordians found new masters to wield them against Dycroft's vengeful ruler, including Stahn Aileron, Rutee Katrea and Leon Magnus. Stahn's group succeeds in restoring peace, but the world was damaged by Dycroft's weapons, and Leon was killed after he betrayed the group. Destiny 2 begins eighteen years after the events of Tales of Destiny.

=== Characters ===
- Kyle Dunamis (カイル・デュナミス, Kairu Dyunamisu) is the main protagonist of Destiny 2. Kyle is very much like his father, Stahn, although Kyle remembers little about him. His defining personality trait is an aversion towards peacefulness and boredom, always seeking out new things to try.
- Reala (リアラ, Riara) is the main female protagonist, appearing suddenly and holding an air of mystery. While she bears an overly-strong sense of responsibility, she is also bright and highly inquisitive. She is one of the two avatars of the goddess Fortuna (フォルトゥナ, Forutuna).
- Loni Dunamis (ロニ・デュナミス, Roni Dyunamisu) is a young man raised alongside Kyle, being considered a brother by him. A member of the Atamoni Shindan, the military branch of the Order of Atamoni, he has a firm and steady personality that balances against Kyle's hotheadedness.
- Judas (ジューダス, Jūdasu) is a mysterious swordsman who appears before Kyle when the latter is in a pinch. A genius swordsman, he wears a beast skull as a mask to hide his face.
- Nanaly Fletch (ナナリー・フレッチ, Nanarī Furetchi) is a master archer who opposes the Order of Atamoni. In direct contrast to the Order, she believes that happiness should be won by people rather than given to them.
- Harold Belselius (ハロルド・ベルセリオス, Harorudo Beruseriosu) is a famous scientist, and the original creator of the Swordians. Something of a mad scientist, she shares Kyle's love of adventure and has a passionate curiosity about the world.
- Elrane (エルレイン, Erurein) is the main antagonist of Destiny 2. Regarded as a living goddess due to her powers, she has an outwardly meek demeanor and espouses bringing happiness to all mankind. She is one of the two avatars of the goddess Fortuna.
- Barbatos Goetia (バルバトス・ゲーティア, Barubatosu Gētia) is one of the primary antagonists of Destiny 2. A veteran of the War of Heaven and Earth, he was forgotten by history and consequently holds a burning desire to be recognized. His chief traits are an intense desire to live and a callous disregard for others.

=== Plot ===
Kyle Dunamis, the adventurous son of Stahn and Rutee, lives at an orphanage run by Rutee. With the orphanage on the brink of bankruptcy, Kyle defies his mother to go on a quest to search for funds, together with his best friend Loni. Finding a giant Lens, a mysterious girl named Reala emerges from it, claiming to be in search of a hero. Believing that he should become a hero like his parents, he follows Reala so he can prove himself as such. Finding the Lens missing, officials from the Order of Atamoni arrest Kyle and Loni for its theft. They escape with the help of the masked swordsman Judas. After this, Kyle becomes embroiled in the attempts by a man named Barbatos Goetia to kill those who accompanied his parents, eventually learning that Barbatos also killed Stahn when Kyle was five. During his quest, a series of Lens thefts is orchestrated by Elraine, the Holy Woman of the Order of Atamoni who is capable of performing miracles using Lens and seeks to bring happiness to the world through uniting it under a single religion.

During a great theft of Lens, Elrane attacks the group directly, sending them ten years into the future. In this period, the world is beset by conflict between the Order of Atamoni and factions wanting independence from its control. During their travels there, they are joined by Nanaly Fletch. While in this time period, Reala becomes conflicted about who she is, and the group encounters a figure known as the Goddess Fortuna. During this encounter, it is revealed that Elrane and Reala are avatars of Fortuna, designed to save the world and bring happiness to humanity in different ways. Due to her unstable emotions, Reala accidentally transports Nanaly into their time. Feeling guilty because of this, Reala confronts Elraine alone and is captured. Traveling to the ship where the stolen Lens is stored, the group confront Barbatos and Elrane, successfully defeating them and saving Reala. During this confrontation, they learn that "Judas" is in fact the resurrected Leon, who was brought back to life by Elraine just as Barbatos was, but rebelled against her when he knew her full plan.

However, their efforts result in the destruction of the ship, and Reala uses the energy of the Lens to send them through time again. They appear in an alternate timeline where the War of Heaven and Earth was won by the underground dwellers, and Barbatos and Elraine are hailed as saviors. Traveling back to the time of the War, when the initial interference was caused, they ally with Harold Belselius to return history to its proper state. While they are successful and Barbatos is felled, Elraine continues to distort history in her favor. Confronting her one last time, she is defeated, then they are confronted by Fortuna. Defeating her, the group realize that the only way to correct the distorted timeline is to destroy the Lens that forms Fortuna's life source, which will mean Reala will be erased from history. When Reala comes to terms with this and gives her blessing, Kyle destroys Fortuna's Lens, which erases all the changes wrought by her agents and returns the timeline to its original state, sending everyone back to their original times and conditions. In the corrected timeline, Kyle, now raised and trained by both Stahn and Rutee, goes on a journey to the temple where he first met Reala. While her Lens is missing, Kyle's strong will succeeds in bringing Reala back into existence and restoring his memories of her.

== Development ==
Tales of Destiny 2 was co-developed by Wolf Team and Telenet Japan. Development began after work had finished on Tales of Eternia, taking roughly two years to complete. During its early development, the staff consisted of thirty people: when in full development, a team of between sixty and a hundred worked on it. It was developed under the working title Tales of X. After Eternia was completed, the development team considered what to do next, whether a new standalone game or a sequel. As Destiny had a large amount of lore created for it and there were story possibilities for a next generation of characters, it was decided to make a sequel to Destiny. This would be the first direct sequel in the Tales series. Because of the state of the world as it would have evolved after the events of Destiny, it was decided to set the events eighteen years after them and focus on the son of Destiny's protagonist. The key themes for the story were "fate" and "happiness". For the story, the team wanted to effectively portray Kyle's journey to becoming a hero. For this, they drew on themes of "learning from the teacher" as seen in films such as Star Wars and Raiders of the Lost Ark. To create the atmosphere, the team worked at balancing elements of reality and fantasy. The story and script was handled by Japanese scenario company Gekko. Two separate scripts were created for the main story and additional elements such as skits. Both scripts were quite large.

Character designs were created by Mutsumi Inomata. A key element of the designs was the variation of time periods many characters came from. To make the character sprites as close as possible to the original artwork, the team took Inomata's artwork and turned them into 2D "dot-by-dot" sprite pictures. This gave the sprites roughly four times the detail of most environments. They then built the world around the sprites. The sprite details sometimes caused problems, as they would appear larger than the environments when the camera zoomed in. The animated cutscenes were created by anime company Production I.G. The game's opening was the longest ever created for a Tales game up to that point. While many contemporary PS2 role-playing games were being developed around three-dimensional characters, Destiny 2 used two-dimensional sprites for its characters. Part of the reason behind this was that the development team wanted to create the "ultimate 2D RPG". As opposed to previous Tales games, where gameplay development was focused on the battle system, the development leads requested that the gameplay should be "waste-free and strategic". The Grade system and new skill customizing elements, later staples of the series, were also developed. The game's artificial intelligence was markedly improved, the combat system was made both more elaborate and more user-friendly, and health and magic systems were adjusted. The PlayStation 2 hardware enabled the expansion of mini-games, the improvement of the game's graphics, and the incorporation of advanced interactive elements on the world map.

=== Audio ===
The music was composed by regular series composers Motoi Sakuraba and Shinji Tamura. Sakuraba primarily worked on the battle themes and arrangements of previous themes, while Tamura handled selected boss battle tracks and created Reala's theme. They were able to create more tracks with greater detail to them due to the expanded storage capacities of the PS2. As with previous games, a licensed theme song was created by a Japanese artist for the game's opening. For Destiny 2, the theme song was "Key to My Heart" from the album Fairy Tale, by Japanese singer-songwriter Mai Kuraki. Its lyrics were designed to "express the world" of Destiny 2. Arrangements of "Key to My Heart" were featured in the soundtrack. Unlike previous Tales games, where voice work was recorded out of order, the voice work was recorded in order of the game's events to add dramatic weight to the performances. This consequently created difficulties with scheduling and put an added strain on the actors.

== Release ==
Destiny 2 was announced in February 2002 at a special conference about future developments and games for the platform. It was the first Tales title to receive a numbered designation in Japan. As with previous Tales games, it featured a characteristic genre name: "RPG to Release Destiny" (運命を解き放つRPG, Unmei wo tokihanatsu RPG). To promote the game, Namco created a themed PlayStation 2 memory card. In addition, a special competition was organized where the top-tier prizes were copies of the script books for Destiny 2 autographed by the main characters' voice actors. As a pre-order bonus, a special limited edition DVD featuring interviews with the voice cast was created. In addition, a downloadable ring tone based on the theme song and screen displays featuring the main characters was created for mobile phones of the time and released in 2003. The game was released on November 28, 2002, in Japan. It was celebrated with an official launch event, featuring interviews with the production staff and cast. Destiny 2 would be the last Tales game developed by Wolf Team prior to its acquisition by Namco in 2003 and rebranding as Namco Tales Studio.

Destiny 2 was later ported to the PSP. Development began in 2005, after the commercial success of Eternia's PSP port. The port was developed by Alfa System, a frequent collaborator with the Tales team on spin-off titles. The project was directed by Yoshito Higuchi, who had worked on Destiny 2 and became the director of the GameCube port of Tales of Symphonia. While the earlier port of Destiny made significant changes, the Destiny 2 port was meant to preserve and add onto the content of the original. Some of the adjustments included minor tweaks to gameplay, adjustments to fit the PSP's control layout, and adjusting the graphics from 4:3 to 16:9 screen ratio. A new dungeon featuring added story elements was also created. It was released on February 15, 2007.

Outside Japan, Destiny 2 was released in South Korea, Hong Kong and Taiwan by Sony Computer Entertainment in 2003. The Korean version, released on March 27, used Korean voices, a first in the series. The Hong Kong and Taiwan version, released on August 14, only translated texts into traditional Chinese while retaining the Japanese voices. The game was going to be part of a world tour by Sony Computer Entertainment to promote the next generation of role-playing games, but the tensions between America and Iraq at the time and the consequent risks of a terrorist attack caused them to cancel the trip. Asked at the launch event whether an overseas version of the game was being developed, producer Makoto Yoshizumi said he was "not certain". The PSP port was released in South Korea by Namco Bandai Games's local branch on March 5, 2007. Neither the original nor the port has been released in the west, making it one of eleven mainline Tales titles to remain exclusive to Japan.

== Reception ==
Reception

Aggregate score
Aggregator	Score
GameRankings	78.61%(14 reviews)

Review scores
Publication	Score
Famitsu	33/40 (PS2)
RPGFan	86% (PS2)

Awards
Publication	Award
CESA Game Awards 2005	Future Game Award
Famitsu	Gold Award
PlayStation Awards 2005	Gold Award

Namco had high expectations for Destiny 2, anticipating sales of 600,000 units. During its debut week, Destiny 2 reached the top of Japanese gaming sales charts: according to different sources, it sold between just over 498,000 (Famitsu) and under 558,000 (Dengeki) units. For the next three weeks, it remained in second place on the charts behind Pokémon Ruby and Sapphire, accumulating sales of over 603,000. By January 2003, the game had sold over 702,000 units, becoming the eighth best-selling game within that period. The PlayStation 2 version of Tales of Destiny 2 has shipped 977,000 copies worldwide as of December 2007, being the second most successful title in the series at the time. The PSP version sold 73,000 copies in its first week, ranking second in weekly video games sales. By the following week, it had dropped to #25. By the end of 2007, the game had sold just under 115,000 units, reached 146th place in the five hundred top-selling games of the year. In South Korea, the game reached #10 in the country's gaming sales charts. Worldwide shipments of the port as recorded by Namco have reached 129,000 units.

Famitsu Weekly found the story enjoyable, though noted that those who had played Destiny would get more enjoyment out of it, and praised the voice acting. They also found the gameplay and pacing enjoyable, positively noting the option to auto-battle. The game ranked as the 89th all-time favorite game in a 2006 Famitsu readers poll. Japanese website Game Watch found the story impressive, citing its use of time travel and the continued use of Destiny's world and lore. The gameplay, mini-games and customization options was also generally praised, with the reviewer recommending the title to players of the series. RPGFan's Woojin Lee was also positive, praising the gameplay despite the very high encounter rate, and was pleased that an auto-battle option was included. One point that received a more mixed response was the game's music, with the exception of the opening song. In a preview for IGN, David Smith was generally positive about the game. While he disliked the art style and its low-tech look compared to its hardware, he found the gameplay enjoyable and the opening parts of the story fairly relatable. He ended by hoping that Namco would put the effort into localizing the title.

=== Additional media ===
Multiple print adaptations have been made of Destiny 2: these include one three-volume comic anthology, a serialized comic adaptation originally released through Square Enix's Gangan Comics and later collected into five volumes, and an eight-volume yonkoma comic, and a second single-edition yonkoma. Novel adaptations include a novel focusing on Nanaly called Tales of Destiny 2: The Amber Wind, and multiple light novels that told segments of the story from the point of view of different characters, particularly Judas. An illustration book featuring Inomata's artwork for the game was released in March 2005. A five-part CD Drama adaptation was also developed, following the events of the game. The five volumes were released between April and August 2003, under the umbrella titled Tales of Destiny 2 Drama CD. (Note: ドラマCD テイルズ オブ デスティニー2, Teiruzu Obu Desutinī Tsū Dorama CD)
