= Tales of Eternia =

2000 video game

- Original Japanese PlayStation release
- Developers: Wolfteam (PS); Namco Tales Studio (PSP); Tose (Remastered)
- Publishers: JP: Namco; NA: Namco Hometek; EU: Ubisoft
- Director: Eiji Kikuchi
- Producer: Shinichirō Okamoto
- Designers: Takashi Hasegawa; Hiroyuki Suzuki
- Artist: Mutsumi Inomata
- Writer: Sawako Natori
- Composers: Motoi Sakuraba; Shinji Tamura
- Series: Tales
- Engine: Unity (Remastered)
- Platforms: PlayStation; PlayStation Portable; Remastered; Nintendo Switch; Nintendo Switch 2 PlayStation 4 PlayStation 5 Windows; Xbox Series X/S
- Release: PlayStation: JP: November 30, 2000; NA: September 18, 2001; PlayStation Portable: JP: March 3, 2005; AU: February 9, 2006; EU: February 10, 2006; Remastered; Nintendo Switch, Nintendo Switch 2, PlayStation 4, PlayStation 5, Windows, Xbox Series X/S; October 15, 2026
- Genre: Action role-playing game
- Modes: Single-player, multiplayer

Tales of Eternia (Note: Tales of Eternia (Japanese: テイルズ オブ エターニア, Hepburn: Teiruzu Obu Etānia)), known as Tales of Destiny II in its original North America release, is an action role-playing game published by Namco as the third main title in their Tales series. Initially released for the PlayStation in November 2000 in Japan, an English version was later released in North America in September 2001. It was developed by members of Telnet Japan's "Wolfteam", who had previously worked on its predecessors Tales of Phantasia and Tales of Destiny. The game's producers gave it the characteristic genre name RPG of Eternity and Bonds (永遠と絆のRPG, Eien to kizuna no RPG). A port was released for the PlayStation Portable handheld in Japan in March 2005, and the PAL region in February 2006.

The game, set in the fantasy world of Inferia, follows the story of a young hunter named Reid Hershel and his friends, Farah and Keele, as they meet a mysterious girl named Meredy who speaks an unknown language. Their subsequent quest to discover her origins leads them across a dimensional boundary to an entirely different realm known as Celestia, where they become involved in an age-old conflict between the two worlds. Tales of Eternia was mostly well-received during its initial release, and sold approximately 873,000 copies worldwide. It would later inspire a 13-episode anime produced by Xebec loosely based on the game's plot. As part of the Tales Remastered Project, a remastered version was released for PlayStation 4, PlayStation 5, Xbox Series X/S, Nintendo Switch, Nintendo Switch 2 and Steam on October 15, 2026.

== Gameplay ==
A shot of Meredy (far left) casting Freeze Lancer, with (left to right) Keele, Farah, and Reid

The game plays similar to other Tales games, following the precedent set by previous role-playing video games in general as well. An overworld map is used to navigate from one location to another in the game's fictional world. Cities and towns, which are populated with NPCs, are valuable sources of information, for either triggering events that move the plot forward, or extra information that fleshes out the game's story and setting. Additionally, city merchants will exchange Gald, the in-game currency, for items or equipment that can be vital to completing the game. Progress can be saved at any time - a first for the series, and the player can also learn recipes throughout the game, using them to cook status-enhancing or healing food out of combat.

Battles with enemies are done through the Linear Motion Battle System, a hybrid fighting system that combines fighting game and traditional role-playing game elements. Movements and attacks are done in real-time, with the fighting being compared to the Street Fighter series. Much like its predecessors, Tales of Eternia gives the player a large degree of control over computer-controlled allies and the techniques they use.

Since the player only directly controls one character at a time, all other characters are governed by the general rules of AI behavior set by the player before and during battle. During battle, the player can switch which character he or she is controlling, while issuing specific orders to other allies to execute certain techniques on command. The action can be paused to use different menus for things such as item. The game's menu screens can be used to organize and uses items, creates new magic spells, develops battle strategies, changes character equipment, and views character statistics. Selected features from the menu screen, such as item use and AI settings, are available in battle, while other aspects are relegated to outside of battle.

== Plot ==
=== Synopsis ===
The game follows Reid Hershel as he tries to prevent the Grand Fall, a cataclysmic event that would destroy his planet along with that of newly found traveling generate persistent mistrust between the two groups. The Orbus Barrier has shown recent signs of weakening and possible collapse due to the actions of an unknown external force.

The journey takes Reid across both planets, as he seeks out those responsible for this movement towards the brink of annihilation.

=== Main characters ===
- Reid Hershel (リッド・ハーシェル, Riddo Hāsheru; Rid Hershel in Japan) is an 18-year-old hunter from a small village who grew up with Farah and Keele. He is a laid-back character who enjoys a quiet life of eating and sleeping, and possesses a mysterious power known as "Fibril" which grants extraordinary abilities. His name comes from British astronomer William Herschel.
- Farah Oersted (ファラ・エルステッド, Fara Erusuteddo) is a 17-year-old farmhand and martial artist skilled in hand-to-hand combat and quick combination attacks. She is characterized as being headstrong as well as altruistic and caring with a keen sense of justice, and has a budding relationship with Reid throughout the course of the game. Her name comes from Danish physicist Hans Ørsted.
- Keele Zeibel (キール・ツァイベル, Kīru Tsaiberu; Keel Zeibel in Japan) is a 17-year-old student of magic known as a Craymal Mage. Although he is physically weak and tires easily, he has an insatiable hunger for knowledge and unlocking the mysteries of his world, yet he is sometimes blinded by his over-reliance on science and pure logic.
- Meredy (メルディ, Merudi) is a 16-year-old Craymal Mage from Celestia who speaks a language alien to the Inferians, "Melnics", that prevents her from being understood at the beginning of the game. A happy-go-lucky girl, she is known to spontaneously break into dance and is always accompanied by her pet Quickie (クィッキー, Kuikkī).
- Chat (チャット, Chatto) is a 12-year-old Celestian and descendant of a famous pirate who styles herself as the oddball captain of his impressive ship, the Van Eltia. Though highly intelligent for her age, she lived in isolation and avoided contact with most people until she met Reid and his friends. She fights using her handbag with an assortment of tools.
- Max (フォッグ, Foggu; Fog in Japan) is a 38-year-old Celestian leader of the resistance group Shikeska, who are in direct opposition against the corrupt Celestian government. Loud, boisterous, and prone to laughter, he wields special high-powered energy cannons that can fire capsules of a variety of elements.
- Rassius "Ras" Luine (レイシス・フォーマルハウト(レイス), Reishisu Fōmaruhauto (Reisu); Rassis "Race" Fomalhaut in Japan) is a mysterious 25-year-old swordsman who masquerades as a merchant. Despite his calm outward appearance, he is a highly determined fighter who periodically aids Reid and his friends on their journey. His name comes from the Fomalhaut star in the constellation Piscis Austrinus.

== Development ==
Tales of Eternia was first announced in a September 1999 press conference by representatives of Namco as the third game in the Tales series, and was later shown in non-playable form at the Tokyo Game Show in March 2000. Character design was handled by artist Mutsumi Inomata, who had previously worked on the game's predecessor Tales of Destiny, and features animated cutscenes by anime studio Production I.G. Namco released a limited special edition of the game in Japan alongside its standard release known as the Tales of Eternia Premium Box (テイルズ オブ エターニア プレミアム ボックス, Teiruzu Obu Etānia Puremiamu Bokkusu), which included character figurines, an art book, and a clock shaped like the character Quickie. Players who preordered the game in participating Sofmap electronics stores also received an alarm clock featuring official artwork of the main cast.

While eventually released under this name in Japan, when released in the North American region, the game was retitled to Tales of Destiny II. Some speculated the game was retitled to avoid trademark infringement on the word "Eternia", owned by Mattel in North America for the Masters of the Universe toyline, but the game's creators stated it was done strictly for brand name and brand recognition reasons; Tales of Destiny was the first of the Tales game to be released in North America, and they wanted to draw a clear connection between the two games. The first game in the Tales series, Tales of Phantasia, released in 1995 for the Super Famicom, was not brought to North America until it was ported to the Game Boy Advance and released later in 2006, so for some time, Tales of Destiny was the beginning of the series for North American audiences. The naming choice would later cause further confusion after the release of the PlayStation 2 game known as Tales of Destiny 2, a genuine sequel to Tales of Destiny taking place in the same fictional world. Tales of Eternia is not actually directly related to Tales of Destiny, and is a different game from Tales of Destiny 2 for the PlayStation 2 in 2002.

== Re-releases ==
=== PSP ===
In early 2004, Namco announced a port of Tales of Eternia for the PlayStation Portable handheld under the project codename "T.O.E." A playable demo was featured at the 2004 Electronic Entertainment Expo in Los Angeles in June, and later at the 2004 Tokyo Game Show the following September. The game itself was largely unchanged, although Namco did manage to greatly reduce loading times, eliminating the need for any "now loading" signs altogether. Graphically, the game was altered to match the PSP's specifications. The field graphics were cropped, and the battles being redone in full widescreen, and the frame rate was improved in the overworld map. The Japanese version was purposefully released on March 3, 2005 (3/3) due to the game being the third unique title in the Tales series.

Namco only published the PSP version of the game in Japan; Ubisoft picked up the game for distribution in Europe, and it went unreleased in North America. The game, which had not been released in Europe prior to the PSP release, retained the Tales of Eternia title, despite Tales of Destiny II being used in the prior English language release in North America.

=== Remastered version ===
On June 9, 2026, Bandai Namco Entertainment announced a remaster, titled Tales of Eternia: Remastered that was launched on October 16, 2026.

== Audio ==
The music of Tales of Eternia was composed by Motoi Sakuraba and Shinji Tamura, who had previously collaborated on the soundtracks to both Tales of Phantasia and Tales of Destiny. Its Japanese theme song, "Flying" was performed by J-Rock group Garnet Crow, which was replaced in the English versions by an original orchestral piece.

An official soundtrack was released in March 2001 by Marvelous Entertainment containing 109 tracks from the game across two discs. One month later in April 2001, Namco released a second soundtrack by Media Factory called Tales of Eternia Remaster Audio (テイルズ・オブ・エターニア リマスターオーディオ, Teiruzu Obu Etānia Rimasutāōdio), which featured the same tracks in slightly better quality and arranged in a more logical order closer to how they appear in the game itself. A five-volume radio drama album series called Drama CD Tales of Eternia (ドラマCD「テイルズ オブ エターニア, Dorama CD Teiruzu Obu Etānia) was released between November 2000 and March 2001 by Movic, as well as a two-volume drama series called Tales of Eternia: Labyrinth ~Forget-Me-Not~ (テイルズオブエターニア Labyrinth～forget－me－not～, Teiruzu Obu Etānia Labyrinth ~Forget-Me-Not~) released from January to February 2002.

== Reception ==
Reception

Aggregate score
Aggregator	Score	
Aggregator	PS	PSP
Metacritic	78 / 100	82 / 100

Review scores
Publication	Score	
Publication	PS	PSP
AllGame	4/5	N/A
Electronic Gaming Monthly	7 / 10	N/A
Eurogamer	N/A	8 / 10
Famitsu	33 / 40	33 / 40
Game Informer	7.75 / 10	N/A
GamePro	4/5	N/A
GameSpot	7.1 / 10	N/A
IGN	8.5 / 10	N/A
Official U.S. PlayStation Magazine	3.5/5	N/A
PALGN	N/A	9 / 10
The Sydney Morning Herald	N/A	3/5

Reception

Aggregate score
Aggregator	Score
OpenCritic	64% recommend (Note: Based on 28 reviews.)

=== PlayStation version ===
Tales of Eternia was well received in Japan, earning a 33 out of 40 possible score from Weekly Famitsu based on individual reviews of 9, 8, 8, and 8, earning the publication's Gold Award. In 2006, the magazine's readers voted it the 57th greatest game of all time, and the second highest-ranked Tales title released at that point. It sold over 550,000 copies in Japan by the end of 2000, resulting in Sony Computer Entertainment Japan bestowing a Gold Award at the 2001 PlayStation Awards ceremony for selling over 500,000 copies in the region by April 2001. By December 2007, the game had sold over 873,000 copies worldwide.

The game received "favorable" reviews according to video game review aggregator Metacritic. IGN praised the gameplay, citing "a great action-oriented battle system that has no close equivalent in any other game". GameSpot recommended it only to people who value gameplay over graphics, stating "it's a good bit of fun to play" but it "...would not be out of place on the Super Nintendo about eight years ago" regarding graphics. Namco's localization effort was generally seen as sufficient, with the humor of the script translated to the North American audience, but reviewers found the game's voice acting to be deficient and unremarkable. AllGame praised the gameplay, character designs, and 2D graphics, but criticized the game's weaker, less emphasized story, and the voice acting, stating "It isn't that the voice actors do a horrible job, it's just that more often than not, they sound as if they're waiting to get their oil changed instead of on a life-or-death mission."

=== PlayStation Portable version ===
Like its predecessor, the Japanese PlayStation Portable version of Tales of Eternia received a 33 out of 40 possible score from Famitsu based on scores of 8, 8, 9, and 8. The game sold 80,650 copies in its first week, entering the Japanese sales charts as the second-best selling title during that period, and would go on to sell approximately 398,000 copies worldwide by December 2007.

The PSP version also received "favorable" reviews according to video game review aggregator Metacritic. Eurogamer said that the game was "...by far and away the best RPG for the PSP currently on the market (as of April 2006)...", praising the graphics and gameplay, complaining the story felt "cliche" and "rushed". PALGN praised the story of the game, stating, "The story on its own has a few major twists and goes along at a pace that will keep you interested, but it's not that spectacular, but still has quite a bit of depth" and the game's sense of exploration, stating "That's one of the best things about Tales of Eternia. Despite being somewhat linear, you can still go your own way. The depth in the story and in the gameplay itself allow you to really play as you wish." In 2012, Game Informer named Farah one of the best characters in the Tales series, calling her "a loveable character with infectious energy."

== Other media ==
=== Anime ===
- Tales of Eternia
- Anime television series
- Directed by: Shigeru Ueda
- Produced by: Kazuya Watanabe; Takatoshi Chino
- Written by: Hiroyuki Kawasaki
- Music by: Takanori Arisawa
- Studio: Xebec
- Licensed by: NA: Media Blasters (expired)
- Original network: Wowow
- Original run: January 8, 2001 – March 26, 2001
- Episodes: 13

A 13 episode anime series produced and animated by Xebec also called Tales of Eternia was inspired by the game; the series originally ran on the satellite channel Wowow from January 8 to March 26, 2001. Tales of Eternia was licensed by Media Blasters on July 6, 2002, for North American distribution, but the company's license expired and it was never released in the region. The plot of the anime series is completely unrelated to the story of the original game, but contains common elements including the four main characters, Greater Craymels, and spells. A manga version of the anime was released in 2002.

=== Tales of Eternia Online ===
Tales of Eternia Online, the thirteenth main title in the series and a massively multiplayer online role-playing game set in the world of Eternia was released on March 3, 2006, in only Japan and was active there until March 31, 2007. Subscribers were able to play online for free after paying monthly fees up to January 29, 2007, until the service ended. Japanese media cited "a declining number of accounts", but the company Bandai Namco Games did not disclose its reasons to shut down the game.

The company partnered with Dwango as of 2004 and performed the game's beta testing in early 2005 before the game's release. The online game's timeline is set around the time when the main characters journey to Celestia. Its gameplay was similar to that of the Tales games but tweaked for the online game. It lets players customize their own characters, and small window boxes appear during players' conversations with each other. The character classes are warriors, skilled at defense against enemy attacks; swordspersons, skilled at attacking; martial artists, skilled at agility and with healing and attack abilities; white sorcerers, with healing and support spells; and magic sorcerers, with attack spells. A party can be formed up to four players, but any player can fight solo. The leader of a party decides whoever can earn experience points and items after battle. The game also features minigames, including one involving cooking with ingredients obtained or purchased during the game. The game required a computer running Windows 98 Second Edition or higher.
