= Eiji Kikuchi =

Japanese video game director

Eiji Kikuchi (菊池 栄二, Kikuchi Eiji) is a video game director best known as the series director of the Tales role-playing game series. He presently works for Namco Tales Studio, where he is a minority shareholder.
