= Tales of Destiny =

1997 video game

- Original North American PlayStation version box art
- Developers: Wolf Team (PS); Namco Tales Studio (PS2)
- Publishers: PlayStation: JP: Namco; NA: Namco Hometek; PlayStation 2 Bandai Namco Games
- Producer: Eiji Kikuchi
- Artist: Mutsumi Inomata
- Writer: Kazuya Ishizuka
- Composers: Motoi Sakuraba; Shinji Tamura
- Series: Tales
- Platforms: PlayStation, PlayStation 2
- Release: PlayStation: JP: December 23, 1997; NA: September 30, 1998; PlayStation 2: JP: November 30, 2006; JP: January 31, 2008 (Director's Cut)
- Genre: Action role-playing game
- Modes: Single-player, multiplayer

Tales of Destiny (Note: Tales of Destiny (テイルズ オブ デスティニー, Teiruzu Obu Desutinī)) is an action role-playing game originally developed by Telenet Japan's "Wolf Team" as the second main title in Namco's "Tales of" series. Originally released in Japan for the PlayStation in December 1997, an English version was later made available in North America in September 1998. The game features many of the same development staff as its predecessor, Tales of Phantasia, including composers Motoi Sakuraba and Shinji Tamura, with character designs by series newcomer Mutsumi Inomata. Its producers gave it the characteristic genre name (Note: RPG of Destiny RPG of Destiny (運命のRPG, Unmei no RPG)). A remake for the PlayStation 2 was released in November 2006, which was followed by an updated version called Tales of Destiny Director's Cut (Note: Tales of Destiny Director's Cut (テイルズ オブ デスティニー ディレクターズカット, Teiruzu Obu Desutinī Direkutāzukatto)) in January 2008, both exclusive to Japan. The remake was also given its own unique genre name by its producers as RPG called 'Destiny (Note: RPG called 'Destiny (運命という名のRPG, Unmei to iu na no RPG)).

Taking place in a fantasy world, the game follows the story of Stahn, a young man who comes across a sentient sword named Dymlos and his subsequent encounters with other similar sword-wielders. Eventually, he and his friends must unite against evil forces seeking a relic from an ancient war. The PlayStation version of Tales of Destiny was mostly well-received, selling over a million copies worldwide and going on to become the highest selling Tales game in Japan.

== Gameplay ==
Battle from the original PlayStation version of Tales of Destiny

The game uses an enhanced version of the Linear Motion Battle System that debuted in the first game of the series, Tales of Phantasia. Battles take place on a 2-D plane where characters and enemies act in real time. Melee and ranged attacks are executed in real time, with spell casting requiring a chanting time that increases directly with the complexity of the spell being cast. When the chanting of a spell is complete, game-time temporarily stops as the spell animation is carried out and damage is assigned, so spells essentially pause the battle when cast. Special melee and ranged attacks do more damage or have more hits than normal attacks, but require technical points, or TP, to be consumed for use. Also, the battle system rewards the player with extra experience for stringing together multi-hit combos. The end result of this break from turn-based RPG battle systems is a more fast-paced and reaction-oriented system that behaves more like a side-scrolling action game.

Pre-battle options include assigning spells and special attacks to buttons and button-directional combinations, changing the party's battle formation or order, and assigning AI behavioral patterns for computer-controlled allies. Certain spells can also be taken off the active casting list for computer-controlled allies. At any one time, the AI is controlling the other characters in the party that the player is not directly commanding, taking general strategic orders into consideration when acting. The player controls one character directly at a time, but can switch to other characters and issue special attack or spell orders for any character on command using an in-battle menu system. This menu system enables the player to use items, spells, or special attacks at will during battle. The menu system also allows the use of general commands given to the entire party during battle, along with instant adjustment of previous strategy or formation orders.

== Plot ==
=== Setting ===
In the past, a comet crashed into the world, throwing dust clouds into the sky and shrouding the world in cold and darkness. At about the same time, the inhabitants, the Aethers, discovered a new form of energy from the meteorite's core, which they named Lens. Combining this with further research, the people were able to create cities in the sky and live in them. Unfortunately, only a select few were chosen, leaving the rest of the people to remain on the bleak surface of the planet. These people became known as the Erthers.

Over time, the sky's inhabitants became known as the Aetherians and their Aeropolis cities. They created a horrific weapon called the Belcrant that shot down any who dared oppose them. This caused full-scale war to erupt between the two civilizations, now known as the Aeth'er Wars. However, regardless of their will and persistence, the Aetherians continued to have the power to dominate every engagement through the use of their superweapon.

In their disgust of their civilization's elitist behavior, a group of Aetherian scientists went to the surface. There, with aid from the people, they were able to create special swords, called Swordians, that were sentient. Unlike other weapons, these swords chose their masters and were able to call upon the elements of nature to do their will. Using these weapons, the people of the surface finally had an edge against the Aetherians.

Thanks in part to the Swordians and their masters, scores of Aeropolis were sunk to the depths of the ocean. In the end, the Erthers claimed victory over the Aetherians. Thousands of years later, this story has been mostly forgotten. In the meantime, the purposeless Swordians fell into a deep stasis sleep, only to awaken when grave threats rose once again.

=== Story ===
The story of the game begins when country-boy-turned-adventurer Stahn Aileron, who seeks fame and adventure, sneaks aboard the flying ship Draconis as a stowaway. He is found out by the crew and forced to work as a deckhand, but when a large hostile force attacks the ship, the crew is overwhelmed and Stahn breaks free during the ensuing chaos. Looking for a usable weapon to fend off the attackers, he gains access to a storeroom and discovers a "junk" sword. However, the sword starts talking to him, calling itself Dymlos and claiming to be a sentient Swordian from the Aeth'er Wars. Armed with Dymlos, Stahn fights his way to an escape pod, which he uses to escape the rapidly descending ship before it crashes into the ground.

Dymlos becomes the key to the fame, fortune, and adventure Stahn seeks as the young man meets other Swordians, quickly becoming embroiled in a battle for a relic of the Aeth'er Wars: a huge, extremely powerful Lens called the Eye of Atamoni.

=== Main characters ===
- Stahn Aileron (Note: Stahn Aileron (スタン・エルロン, Sutan Eruron; "Stan Aileron")) is a 19-year-old adventurer who grows into a powerful sword-based physical fighter, Stahn is the protagonist of Tales of Destiny. Not known for his intelligence or his cultured background, his fire-elemental Swordian is Dymlos.
- Rutee Katrea (Note: Rutee Katrea (ルーティ・カトレット, Rūti Katoretto; "Rutee Kartret")), armed with Atwight, the Swordian of water, is an 18-year-old headstrong Lens hunter who travels the world looking to make a profit with her partner, Mary, and eventually develops a romantic relationship with Stahn.
- Leon Magnus (Note: Leon Magnus (リオン・マグナス, Rion Magunasu; "Lion Magnus")) is a master swordsman of Seinegald – at age 16 the youngest in history to serve the kingdom, and a close associate of the president of the powerful Oberon Company. A complex and slightly brooding character, Leon's agile Swordian is Chaltier.
- Philia Felice (Note: Philia Felice (フィリア・フィリス, Firia Firisu; "Philia Philis")) is a 19-year-old priestess. Isolated from the outside world until the events of the game, she has a sweet, charming personality and is very dependable, but she can also be overly fastidious. Her powerful spell casting ability is augmented by her Swordian, Clemente.
- Garr Kelvin (Note: Garr Kelvin (ウッドロウ・ケルヴィン, Uddorō Keruvin; "Woodrow Kelvin")) is the 23-year-old Prince of Phandaria, and a skilled archer as well as a swordsman; Igtenos is his wind-elemental Swordian. Wise and mature, he is known for his cool-headed battle tactics.
- Mary Argent (Note: Mary Argent (マリー・エージェント, Marī Ējento; "Mary Agent")) is a 24-year-old woman who suffers from amnesia, and is not aware of her last name due to an unknown event in her past. Mary has no Swordian, but can use swords and axes as a strong physical attacker. She is generally easy-going, but sometimes flies into berserker rages in battle.
- Chelsea Torn (Note: Chelsea Torn (チェルシー・トーン, Cherushī Tōn; "Chelsea Tone")) is the 14-year-old granddaughter of Garr's archery master, Alba. Though she appears cute and innocent, she is an archer skilled beyond her age.
- Bruiser Khang (Note: Bruiser Khang (マイティ・コングマン, Maiti Konguman; "Mighty Kongman")) is a 39-year-old powerful fighter from a battle arena. Loud and egotistical, he uses his fists as weapons.
- Karyl Sheeden (Note: Karyl Sheeden (ジョニー・シデン, Jonī Shiden; "Johnny Shiden")) is the estranged 26-year-old son of an aristocratic family and a bard by trade. Seemingly fragile from outward appearances, he can provide useful support in the party through songs played on his lute.
- Lilith Aileron (Note: Lilith Aileron (リリス・エルロン, Ririsu Eruron; "Lilith Aileron")) is Stahn's younger sister. She is cheerful and energetic, but knows when to command respect when she is angry. Lilith fights with a frying pan and has no Swordian.

== Development ==
Tales of Destiny was originally developed by members of Telnet Japan and Wolf Team, who had previously worked on Tales of Phantasia. The game features character designs by anime and manga artist Mutsumi Inomata, as well as animated cutscenes produced by Japanese studio Production I.G. It was exhibited at the September 1997 Tokyo Game Show. An English version was announced for North America originally for the third or fourth quarter of 1998, and would later appear at the 1998 Electronic Entertainment Expo in Atlanta. Its North American producer commented that since the game's two-dimensional graphics were so "ordinary", the translation team focused on creating "an outstanding localization" to compensate. Namco America had originally intended to dub the character voices into English, and searched for "excellent voice talent to fill [the] positions", yet the final version still retains the original Japanese audio.

=== PlayStation 2 versions ===
In a June 2006 press conference, Namco Bandai Games announced that a remake of Tales of Destiny for the PlayStation 2 was in development and due for release some time the following winter in Japan. The remake contains several new features, including three-dimensional environments, re-drawn character sprites, and an expanded version of the original PlayStation releases' Linear Motion Battle System known as the "Aerial Linear Motion Battle System" (AR-LMBS) that emphasizes mid-air combat and elaborate combination attacks. In addition, all key cutscenes are now fully voiced, as well as a new feature called the Active Party Window where characters interact with each other during the adventure. It made an appearance at the 2006 Tokyo Game Show, where it was given a release date set for the following November. However, the discovery of unexpected bugs led to the title being delayed past its original due date of November 22, and was instead released on November 30.

Screen of the Director's Cut showcasing the new "Leon Mode" and the 3D map screen

Namco Bandai Games later announced in a July 2007 press conference that yet another version of Tales of Destiny would be released for the PlayStation 2 called the Tales of Destiny Director's Cut (Note: Tales of Destiny Director's Cut (テイルズ オブ デスティニー ディレクターズカット, Teiruzu Obu Desutinī Direkutāzukatto)), and would be due for release in early 2008. This version was designed to be compatible with the original PlayStation 2 remake's save data, and features new story events and battle difficulty settings. A new "Leon Mode" allows players to take control of the character Leon and experience story events from his point of view, and Stahn's younger sister Lilith is now a playable character. The game was released in Japan in January 2008 alongside a limited special edition packaged with an artbook and soundtrack. The PS2 version received a full fan translation in 2021.

=== Audio ===
The music for Tales of Destiny was written by Motoi Sakuraba and Shinji Tamura, who had both previously collaborated on the soundtrack for Tales of Phantasia. The Japanese version also features the opening theme song Yume de Aruyouni (Note: Yume de Aruyouni (夢であるように, lit. "Like a Dream")) by J-pop group Deen. The English version uses an original track, due to licensing issues. An official soundtrack for the original PlayStation version was released in March 2000 by Movic containing a total of 76 songs across two discs. In May 2007, a soundtrack for the PlayStation 2 remake was made available by King Records, and featured 108 songs on four discs.

Numerous Tales of Destiny radio drama albums featuring the Japanese voice cast have been produced since 1998. A three-volume set called Drama CD Tales of Destiny (Note: Drama CD Tales of Destiny (ドラマＣＤ 「テイルズ オブ デスティニー」Ｖｏｌ．１, Dorama CD `Teiruzu Obu Desutinī')) was released between October 1998 and January 1999 by Movic Records, which were followed by another three-volume collection called Radio Tales of Destiny DJCD (Note: Radio Tales of Destiny DJCD (ラジオ テイルズ・オブ・デスティニー ＤＪＣＤ, Rajio teiruzu Obu desutinī DJCD)) released between April and June 1999. A third three-volume set called Tales of Destiny Tenjō (Note: Tales of Destiny Tenjō (テイルズ・オブ・デスティニー 天上, lit. Tales of Destiny: The Heavens)) was also produced by Movic and released between June and August 1999. In December 1999, a stand-alone drama album entitled Tales of Destiny ~Proust~ Forgotten Chronicle (Note: Tales of Destiny ~Proust~ Forgotten Chronicle (テイルズ・オブ・デスティニー～プルースト・Ｆｏｒｇｏｔｔｅｎ Ｃｈｒｏｎｉｃｌｅ, Teiruzu Obu Desutinī Purūsuto Forgotten Chronicle)) was released.

== Reception ==
Reception

Aggregate score
Aggregator	Score
GameRankings	PS: 73%

Review scores
Publication	Score
Electronic Gaming Monthly	PS: 8.12 / 10
Famitsu	PS: 8/10, 7/10, 8/10, 8/10; PS2: 32 / 40
Game Informer	PS: 6.75 / 10
GameSpot	PS: 4.9 / 10
IGN	PS: 7.5 / 10
Next Generation	3/5

=== PlayStation version ===
The four critics in Weekly Famitsu magazine each gave the game individual scores of 8, 7, 8, and 8, earning it the publication's Silver Award. In 2006, Famitsu readers would declare it the 79th greatest game of all time in its "All Time Top 100" feature, making it the third highest-ranking Tales game on the list. The game sold over 450,000 copies in Japan by the end of 1997, and it received a "Gold Prize" from Sony in May 1998, indicating sales above 500,000 units in Japan. It went on to sell approximately 1,139,000 copies worldwide by December 2007. It was the best-selling individual single-platform Tales game, as of December 2007.

The English version received generally positive reception in North America, earning a 73% average score from aggregate review website GameRankings. IGN gave the game a 7.5 of 10, stating the game was "Highly recommended, as long as you're a fan of the classic Super NES". IGN praised the game for its gameplay, story, and sound, but criticized the graphics for not being much better than what the Super NES was capable of, and the frequency of the battles. RPGFan gave the game an 88% rating overall, calling the battle system "a blast to play" and "well-balanced", but had mixed feelings on the graphics, calling it "...not even as good as some of the SNES" on in the game, but saying it improves farther into the game, stating "Transparencies, lighting, reflections and beautifully drawn textures make each area interesting". RPGamer was less enthusiastic, giving the game a 6 out of 10, calling it "a fairly good game" but not without its flaws. The battle system was praised, but the lack of originality was criticized.

GameSpot, however, was much more negative in regards to the game, giving it a 4.9 out of 10. Problems cited included "...a stale and exceedingly slow-moving story...boring, moldy characters and dry, musty dialogue..." and poor graphics, stating that it looked and sounded "...far too much like an SNES game, Tales of Destiny seems like it was originally intended to be a sequel on the SNES that got delayed well into the PlayStation's life cycle. While the game's overall poor graphics were widely criticized by reviewers, Production I.G's opening anime video did receive praise from numerous critics.

Next Generation reviewed the PlayStation version of the game, rating it three stars out of five, and stated that "Tales of Destiny is a simple yet enjoyable romp through what RPGs once were – long adventures featuring lots of character interaction and battles. And with this perspective, expect the game to be entertaining and even challenging at times."

=== PlayStation 2 version ===
The PlayStation 2 remake received a slightly higher score of 32 out of 40 from editors of Weekly Famitsu based on scores of 8, 8, 8, and 8, granting it a Gold Award. The original version sold approximately 368,000 copies in Japan by the end of 2006, while the Director's Cut would sell 142,301 copies by the end of 2008, becoming the 92nd most-bought software title in the region that year.

== Legacy ==
The game received a direct sequel, Tales of Destiny 2, which released in 2002 on the PlayStation 2, and was ported to the PlayStation Portable in 2006. Both versions of the game were only released in Asia. It is not to be confused with Tales of Eternia which was released as "Tales of Destiny II" in North America.
