= List of Ascendance of a Bookworm characters =

The light novel series Ascendance of a Bookworm and its adaptations features an extensive cast of characters created by Miya Kazuki and You Shiina.

== Main characters ==
Myne (マイン, Main) / Urano Motosu (本須 麗乃, Motosu Urano) / Rozemyne (ローゼマイン, Rōzemain)
Voiced by: Yuka Iguchi (Japanese); Reba Buhr (English)
The titular bookworm, Urano (a college student) was on the cusp of being a librarian when she was crushed to death under a pile of books during an earthquake. She reincarnated as a sickly five-year-old girl named Myne, but in a world where books are only for extremely rich nobles. Her frailty is due to a rare disease known as the "Devouring," which consists of high fevers which flares up whenever the host is stressed or depressed. Now, Myne has to put her book knowledge to the test in order to become a librarian in her new world.
Ferdinand (フェルディナンド, Ferudinando)
Voiced by: Show Hayami (Japanese); Armen Taylor (English)
The High Priest in the city of Ehrenfest.

== Supporting characters ==
=== Introduced in Part 1 ===
Tuuli (トゥーリ, Tūri)
Voiced by: Megumi Nakajima (Japanese); Lisa Reimold (English)
Myne's elder sister by one year who follows her mother's craft in becoming a seamstress.
Effa (エーファ, Ēfa)
Voiced by: Fumiko Orikasa (Japanese); Kirsten Day (English)
Myne and Tuuli's mother who is a seamstress by trade and works at a dye factory.
Gunther (ギュンター, Gyuntā)
Voiced by: Tsuyoshi Koyama (Japanese); Kaiji Tang (English)
Myne and Tuuli's father who works as a soldier and a guard for the city of Ehrenfest.
Lutz (ルッツ, Ruttsu)
Voiced by: Mutsumi Tamura (Japanese); Jeannie Tirado (English)
Myne's childhood best friend who helps her in her business of making paper and creating books. He initially wanted to be a traveling merchant, but after being dissuaded by Otto, he decides to work with Myne and be the muscle to her brain. He is the first to suspect Myne is not who she used to be, and in fact taken over by someone else.
Ralph (ラルフ, Rarufu)
Voiced by: Hitomi Nabatame (Japanese); Danielle McRae (English)
He is the third of four brothers, and the older brother of Lutz.
Otto (オットー, Ottō)
Voiced by: Satoshi Hino (Japanese); Joe Zieja (English)
A former traveling merchant and now soldier and military accountant of Ehrenfest. He teaches Myne how to read and write the language of the new world.
Benno (ベンノ)
Voiced by: Takehito Koyasu (Japanese); Xander Mobus (English)
A city merchant who takes Myne and Lutz under his wing and helps them grow their bookmaking business. After realizing the potential Myne and Lutz have at their craft, he is insistent on training them to be merchants and argues against others who want the pair for themselves.
Mark (マルク, Maruku)
Voiced by: Tomoaki Maeno (Japanese); Brian Anderson (English)
An assistant at Benno's store who helps Myne and Lutz on their journey.
Gustav (グスタフ, Gusutafu)
Voiced by: Hiroshi Naka (Japanese); Brook Chalmers (English)
The head of the Merchant Guild in Ehrenfest and Benno's senior. He agrees to allow Lutz and Myne to become temporarily registered merchants after seeing the products the duo are able to create.
Freida (フリーダ, Furīda)
Voiced by: Aya Uchida (Japanese); Kayli Mills (English)
Gustav's granddaughter who wants to buy one of Myne's hairpins to wear at her baptism. Like Myne, she has the incurable illness known as the "Devouring."

=== Introduced in Part 2 ===
Gil (ギル, Giru)
Voiced by: Yūko Sanpei (Japanese); Laura Stahl (English)
A young grey-robed boy who is placed as Myne's retainer. He is pompous, brash, and believes himself superior to Myne, even though he is beneath her in the temple hierarchy. He eventually comes around and serves Myne faithfully after she shows him kindness and compassion.
Fran (フラン, Furan)
Voiced by: Shō Karino (Japanese); Chris Hackney (English)
A grey-robed young man who is placed as Myne's retainer. He is quiet, follows the rules, and is highly devoted to the temple. He is the first retainer to earn Myne's trust and becomes her right-hand man.
Delia (デリア, Deria)
Voiced by: Chiyo Tomaru (Japanese); Lizzie Freeman (English)
A young grey-robed girl who is placed as Myne's retainer. She is out to annoy and frustrate Myne on the High Bishop's orders, hoping she will grow up to be his concubine if she's successful. After Myne threatens to send her back to the orphanage, she changes her ways and serves Myne faithfully but still retains her snarky attitude.
Sylvester (ジルヴェスター, Jiruvesutā)
Voiced by: Kazuhiko Inoue
He is the archduke of Ehrenfest.
