= Tales of Mobile =

Video game series

Tales of Mobile (テイルズオブモバイル, Teiruzu Obu Mobairu) is the collective name of several mobile phone-based games, available only to Japanese NTT DoCoMo FOMA 900i cellphone users. The games often feature characters and story elements from the popular Tales role-playing video game series. As these games are offered as a download-only phone service in Japan, none of them have been made available outside Japan outside of Tales of Commons.

== Tales of Tactics ==
Tales of Tactics (テイルズオブタクティクス, Teiruzu Obu Takutikusu) is a tactical RPG similar to other turn-based tactical war games such as the Fire Emblem series. The game allows the player to take control of several characters from other Tales games and use their specific skills to battle enemies across several different boards. Among the recruitable characters are Cless Alvein from Tales of Phantasia, Judas, Kyle, Reala, and Loni from Tales of Destiny 2, Lloyd from Tales of Symphonia and Stahn from Tales of Destiny.

In addition to the normal game, Tales of Tactics also features several additional features as downloadable content, such as a puzzle-based minigame, a picture and movie gallery from several games in the Tales series, and wallpapers. Also the newest release contains a playable demo for "Tales of Tales".

== Tales of Breaker ==
Tales of Breaker
- Developer: Namco Tales Studio
- Publisher: Namco
- Director: Tsutomu Gouda
- Producer: Tsutomu Gouda
- Artist: Mutsumi Inomata
- Writers: Tsutomu Gouda; Akiko Yonemochi
- Composer: Motoi Sakuraba
- Series: Tales
- Platform: i-mode
- Release: i-mode: JP: January 31, 2005; EZapp [Brew]: JP: December 13, 2007
- Genre: Action role-playing game
- Mode: Single-player

Tales of Breaker (Japanese: テイルズ オブ ブレイカー, Hepburn: Teiruzu Obu Bureikā) is a Japanese action role-playing game published by Namco. It is the ninth main title in their Tales series of video games. The game was the second full-fledged role playing game developed by Team Tales of Mobile, a small development team composed of members of Namco Tales Studio, created exclusively to make mobile titles for NTT Docomo as well as EzWeb and Yahoo Keitai. It is the second title in the Tales of Mobile subseries, following the crossover game, Tales of Tactics, and is the first of four games to follow an original story with its own world and characters.

The game was released for i-mode on January 31, 2005, and then later re-released for EZapp [Brew] on December 13, 2007. Breaker features gameplay similar to the ones found in previous titles, and the characters were designed by series veteran Mutsumi Inomata. The scenario was written by Tsutomu Gouda and Akiko Yonemochi, both would go on to be heavily involved in the following three mobile titles. The game's was completed in 6 chapters with a new one releasing each month.

=== Gameplay ===
Tales of Breaker uses a unique take on the traditional Tales system. It uses the 2-2 Linear Motion Battle System (2-2 LMBS). Unlike the previous game's experimental combat, battles go back to being on a singular plane, and this time both player characters and enemies are limited to 2 at all times on screen. This effectively makes the battles more similar to the earlier games, namely, Tales of Phantasia and Tales of Destiny, but without spells or summons pausing the screen. Characters' health is represented by Health Points (HP) and special attacks by Technical Points (TP).

Breaker incorporates the Jenes Migrates (JM). Jenes Migrates are rare jewels of important significance within the game's world that the player can equip and, upon leveling up, boost stats with some unlocking brand new powerful artes named JM artes. Using them requires filling up the JM meter, a red bar in battle that slowly filling up each time the player takes a hit. The maximum limit to equip JM is 10 points, with some costing more than others. Additionally, each character can only equip one JM arte at a time. Mika, the game's protagonist, is the only one who can have more than two JM artes due to her unique background.

=== Plot ===
Tales of Breaker is set on the planet Lucina, a world divided among various nations and tribes. Two major powers vie for influence: the dominant Lilierecht Empire, and the Republic Alliance, a coalition of Audentia, Czarheit, and Grug. The Empire has risen to prominence through exclusive control over Amnisfield-based technology and the powerful Weltex Corporation, enabling it to aggressively expand its reach and pursue global domination.

In a quiet village, a young woman named Mika lives a simple life until an anonymous letter reveals long-buried secrets about her heritage. Compelled by the truth, Mika embarks on a journey of self-discovery. Along the way, she forges bonds with new allies and becomes entangled in a struggle against the Empire, all while confronting the mysteries of her own past.

=== Characters ===
- Mika (ミカ) : The main protagonist of Tales of Breaker. She lost her parents, grandfather, and older brother at a young age and was raised by her grandfather's friend. Eleven years later, an anonymous letter arrives with new information about her family, sending her on a journey of self-discovery. She is able to transform into different Sacred Beasts.
- Yuteki (ユーテキ, Yuuteki) : A researcher for the Weltex corporation, recruited for his innovative inventions and dedication to science. While the company operates under the Lilierecht Empire's goals, Yuteki remains committed to improving lives and takes pride in his work. He first encounters Mika late one night when she sneaks into the facility, quickly finding himself drawn into her adventure.
- Evelyn (イーヴリン, Iivurin) : A black-haired, silver-eyed girl who travels the world under the guise of a JM Hunter, though she's more of an information broker, using the title to move freely. She saves the group from the Holy Sea Knights in Lilierecht's capital and, intrigued by their quest, becomes their protector. Skilled in stealth and negotiation, she is really good at dealing with people.
- Sauber (ザウバー, Zaubaa) : A mysterious JM hunter who often likes to keep to himself. Having been raised by the JM Hunter guild, he has been hunting for Jenes Migrate jewels for most of his life. Though he's not an enemy, Sauber intentionally hides from the party the whole truth about himself. He accompanies Mika's group for his own interests.
- RuRu (ルル) : An experienced magician in the Audentia kingdom. RuRu is a skilled magician able to use a wide variety of spells, even being able to craft a Jenes Migrate for Audentia to use as a water source. As a result of her innocent mindset and mannerisms, she tends to set the mood for the party. She is part of a bloodline of extremely strong fire mages; however, due to something sensitive that happened in her past, she is terrified of fire and refuses to learn fire magic.
- Berger (バーガー, Baagaa) : The champion of the Radish Church and commander of the Holy Sea Knights. Initially an enemy, Berger begins to question his beliefs after being ordered to cross blades with Mika's party. He eventually decides to switch sides, joining with Mika's group to fight against the Lilierecht Empire.
- PoPo (ポポ) : RuRu's companion. Although he cannot speak, they can understand each other and he is always ready to encourage her and cheer her up.

=== Development ===
According to producer Tsutomu Gouda, the title Breaker symbolizes the game's mission to break away from series conventions. It is the first Tales title to offer a classic gameplay experience on mobile, and notably, the first in the series to feature a solo female protagonist, a departure from the typical male or dual protagonist structure seen in previous entries.

The story takes a more mature direction, exploring nuanced themes where the antagonists aren't simply evil but are driven by complex ideologies. A central narrative thread focuses on how people react to differences, be it in beliefs, backgrounds, or ideals. At its core, the story revolves around the theme of Truth the idea that no one has all the answers, but they continue to seek them regardless.

During development, the team had passionate internal debates about visual design choices. Some developers felt that the font should be rounded, to reflect the fact that the protagonist is a girl, while others disagreed, arguing for a style that broke gendered expectations. Similar disagreements arose over the color palette : while some advocated for blue, symbolizing the Amnis Field, others believed that purple and red, representing Mika, better suited the tone and her personal journey.

== Tales of Commons ==
Tales of Commons
- Developer: Namco Tales Studio
- Publishers: Namco (JP); WindySoft (KOR)
- Director: Tsutomu Gouda
- Producer: Tsutomu Gouda
- Artist: You Shiina
- Writers: Tsutomu Gouda; Akiko Yonemochi
- Composer: Motoi Sakuraba
- Series: Tales
- Platforms: i-mode, LG, SKT, KT
- Release: i-mode: JP: October 14, 2005; EZapp (BREW): JP: August 28, 2008; LG, KT, SKT: KOR: April 28, 2010
- Genre: Action role-playing game
- Mode: Single-player

Tales of Commons (Japanese: テイルズ オブ コモンズ, Hepburn: Teiruzu Obu Komonzu) is an action role-playing game in the Tales series of video games published by Namco. It is the eleventh mainline game and the second standalone mobile title developed by Team Tales of Mobile, a subsidiary team part of Namco Tales Studio.

The game was first released in Japan in October 2005 for NTT Docomo's i-mode service then was later ported to au's EZapp in August 2008. It remains the only title in the Tales of Mobile lineup to receive an official release outside Japan. A Korean version, published by WindySoft in 2010, was made available for mobile devices from LG, SKT, and KT.

While the music is composed by longtime series contributor Motoi Sakuraba, Commons, like Tales of Legendia, features character designs from a new artist to the franchise. This time, the visuals were created by freelance illustrator You Shiina, best known for working on titles such as the Ascendance of a Bookworm novel series by Miya Kazuki and the Legend of Heroes series by Nihon Falcom. The game also features a characteristic genre that translates to "RPG to Walk Alongside a Changing World and Trusting Thoughts" (変わりゆく世界 信じる想い 共に歩んでゆくRPG, Kawari yuku sekai shinjiru omoi tomo ni ayunde yuku RPG) and an opening theme, Kiseki, sung by Kana Uemura which was unusual for mobile games at the time.

=== Gameplay ===
Tales of Commons retains the 2-2 Linear Motion Battle System used by Tales of Breaker. Battles take place in a 2D plane limited to 2 characters at all time from both player and enemies, playing in a similar fashion to the original PlayStation version of Tales of Destiny, but without spells stopping actions.

Outside of combats, Tales of Commons plays exactly like its predecessor. However, various additions were made to make it closer to a home console title such as the introduction of series' mainstay, the skits.

The game's skill system makes use of the Souma Orbs. A total of 46 Souma orbs are available throughout the game, each offering various effects such as increased movement speed, enhanced experience point gain, or the addition of elemental attributes to weapon attacks. Certain orbs also grant access to unique abilities known as Souma artes. Each character can equip up to three Souma orbs simultaneously, however, two orbs that correspond to Souma artes cannot be equipped at the same time.

=== Plot ===
Tales of Commons is set in the world of Dionis. A world still recovering following the aftermath of an event named The Third Dionis War, a conflict lasting for 16 years opposing its two countries, Jupiter and Yinfouyang against one another and causing great losses including the total disappearance of a creature known as Gillfxy, a dragon-like species appearing alongside a human's birth to serve as its companion.

The story begins 20 years after the war. A young man named Alvin, while traveling through a forest to visit his late mother's hometown, is drawn to a familiar melody echoing from a nearby ruin. There, he encounters Sefina, who is praying for a miracle to revive the natural Gillfxies. Her prayer is answered as two Gillfxies appear in a flash of light.

Moments later, a pair of assassins emerge, intent on killing the Gillfxies. Just as the situation turns dire, a mysterious man named Seiun intervenes, saving the teenagers and driving the assassins off. With his own natural Gillfxy now at his side, Alvin chooses to accompany the two strangers, marking the true beginning of his journey.

=== Main characters ===
- Alvin (アルヴィン, Aruvin): The main protagonist of Tales of Commons. A bright, curious, but somewhat spoiled young man enjoying a comfortable life thanks to his late parents' inheritance in the border town of Dis. While traveling to his mother's hometown, he hears a familiar childhood song from a nearby temple. There, he meets Sefina, marking the beginning of his adventure.
- Sefina (セフィナ): A young girl from Yinfouyang, she lost her parents when her village was destroyed during the great war. Sheltered and quiet but with a strong sense of goodness, she never stopped believing her late mother will reincarnate as a natural Gillfxy, she often visits the sanctuary, hoping to see her wish fulfilled. During one visit, she meets Alvin, who is captivated by the familiarity of her song.
- Seiun (清雲): The captain of Yinfouyang's Bloom Imperial Brigade, is a loyal, polite, and mature leader, though sometimes stubborn. Acting as a guardian to the group, he rescues Alvin and Sefina during a solo mission, leading them to journey together.
- You (ユウ, Yuu): A mysterious young girl with hidden secrets, she is calm, easygoing, and naive, moving at her own pace. After falling from the sky and wandering alone, she is saved by Alvin and his friends, prompting her to join their journey.

=== Other characters ===
- Ferth (フェルス, Ferusu) : The new Captain of the Bloom Imperial Brigade following Seiun's departure. Stubborn and fixed to his viewpoints, he was once an orphan picked up by the President of Jupiter and raised in combat to serve his country.
- Kinah (キーナ, Kiina) : The self-proclaimed Vice Captain of the Bloom Imperial Brigade. A gentle, kind and considerate woman though she appears cold and strict to impress Ferth with whom she's in love with. She named herself Vice Captain to follow him.
- Rin Fujibayashi (藤林 凛, Fujibayashi Rin) : The next line to become chief of the Ninja Village as well as the commander of the Tamon area unit of the Bloom Imperial Brigade. A firm personality, Rin has been training under the tutelage of Ryuzou Momochi since she was nine after losing her parents as the result of the war.
- Ryuzou Momochi (百地 龍蔵, Momochi Ryuzou) : The head of the Ninja Village located to the north of Yinfouyang and the mentor of Rin.
- Kana (カナ): A mysterious woman who appears before Alvin with her singing voice, guiding him. Whether she has some connection to the legend surrounding Dionis is completely shrouded in mystery. Modeled after Kana Uemura.

=== Development ===
According to producer Tsutomu Goda, the title Commons was inspired by the concepts of "common sense" and "common knowledge", and reflects the diverse cultural backdrop of the game's world, Dionis. The setting draws influence from a variety of regions, including Japan, China, and the Ryukyu Islands, with touches of Western culture as well. The aim was to explore how different perspectives and values intersect, overlap, and often misunderstand one another, yet still coexist. This thematic blend is reflected in the cast : most characters are designed with Asian-inspired aesthetics and weaponry, while the character You stands out with a distinctly European visual style. This cultural layering is also evident in the names of several in-game locations.

During development, the team set out to ensure that Tales of Commons would carry forward some of the stylistic elements from Tales of Breaker. At the same time, they worked to align it more closely with other games within the series, particularly by integrating skits to enhance character development and highlight their personalities.

The world design was initially conceived as a fusion of traditional Tales elements with Japanese aesthetics, oriental influences, and grounded, earthly motifs. Western-style nations were added later to create a broader cultural contrast, reinforcing the story's central idea of progression and separation. To push this idea even further, You Shiina was appointed as the character designer this time around to offer brand-new worldview to the Tales series.

In the early planning phase, the team estimated that the narrative could be told within four chapters. However, as development progressed and characters, particularly Alvin, began to take on a life of their own, the script naturally expanded. To accommodate the growing depth of dialogue and events, a fifth chapter was ultimately added.

== Tales of Wahrheit ==
Tales of Wahrheit
- Developer: Namco Tales Studio
- Publisher: Namco Bandai Games
- Director: Tsutomu Gouda
- Producer: Tsutomu Gouda
- Artist: You Shiina
- Writers: Tsutomu Gouda; Akiko Yonemochi
- Composer: Motoi Sakuraba
- Series: Tales
- Platform: i-mode
- Release: i-mode: JP: June 15, 2006
- Genre: Action role-playing game
- Mode: Single-player

Tales of Wahrheit (Japanese: テイルズ オブ ヴァールハイト, Hepburn: Teiruzu Obu Vāruhaito) is a 2006 action role-playing game developed and published by Namco Bandai Games. It is the fourteenth main installment in the long-running Tales series and the third standalone title released for the Tales of Mobile service.

The game was first released in Japan in June 2006 for NTT Docomo's i-mode service with a new chapter launched each subsequent month. In total, 12 chapters were released, twice the number of its two predecessors.

Like Tales of Commons, the music was composed by series' main composer, Motoi Sakuraba and the character designs were once again handled by You Shiina. The game's opening theme is named Ienai yo and is sung by Japanese Soul and R&B artist, Jamosa alongside rapper CORN HEAD. Tales of Wahrheit also features a characteristic genre which translates to "RPG to Find the Meaning of Living" (生きる意味を見つけるＲＰＧ, Ikiru imi wo mitsukeru RPG)

=== Gameplay ===
Tales of Wahrheit retains the 2-on-2 Linear Motion Battle System first introduced in Tales of Breaker, with virtually no changes.

Outside of combat, Wahrheit features many of the same gameplay mechanics found in the previous two mobile titles, while also introducing new elements and refining existing ones to bring the experience closer to that of the home console entries. Among these returning features are the skits, which function similarly to those in Tales of Commons but with the added enhancement of full voice acting this time.

The Grade system, originally introduced in Tales of Destiny 2, also makes a return. At the end of each battle, players earn or lose Grade points based on their performance. Once the game is completed, these points can be spent in the Grade Shop to purchase various bonuses that enhance subsequent playthroughs.

A new addition exclusive to Wahrheit’s Grade Shop is the ability to purchase SP Rank. SP Rank unlocks an extra mode within a separate game mode called Tales of Wahrheit Colosseum. This arena mode is similar to the one featured in Tales of Breaker, but includes an additional difficulty tier, S Rank. By unlocking SP Rank, players gain access to a series of cameo battles against characters from past Tales games, in classic Tales series tradition.

Tales of Wahrheit features a unique skill system centered around items called Wahlem. These special items grant various effects when equipped. Wahlem that share the same Roman numeral at the end can be fused using a Vessel of Causality. If desired, fused Wahlem can also be dismantled, allowing them to revert to their original forms. Additionally, certain Wahlem with blank notes can be carried over into a New Game+ by purchasing the "Special Item Transfer" option from the Grade Shop. However, not all Wahlem are eligible for transfer, some are automatically dismantled during the process while others cannot be carried over at all. These conditions are specified individually for each item.

=== Plot ===
Tales of Wahrheit takes place in a setting composed of two distinct worlds : Gravina and Vals. These realms are divided by a massive structure known as the Wall of the World, and each possesses its own unique culture, political systems, and customs. The planet becomes embroiled in a growing conflict centered around the Wahlem. An ancient, mysterious crystal said to have descended from the heavens. Revered and feared for its immense power, Wahlem was enshrined as a "Guardian Stone" and placed under strict protection. If misused, it holds the potential to bring about global destruction.

The story begins with Seltz Vakstrum, the son of the famed arms dealer Eizel. While attending the launch ceremony of the world's first airship, known as the Luftship, disaster strikes and the vessel explodes. In the chaos, Seltz watches in horror as his father is arrested and accused of terrorism. Determined to clear his father's name, Seltz sets out in pursuit, driven by a resolve to uncover the truth and rescue him.

=== Main characters ===
- Seltz Vakstrum (セルツ・ヴァクストゥーム, Serutsu Vakusutuum) : The main protagonist of Tales of Wahrheit. A bright, cheerful, and innocent young man from the region of Gross Heidel. As the son of the famed arms dealer Eizel, he has lived a comfortable life without questioning the nature of his father's work. Everything changes after the Luftship launch ends in disaster, and he becomes separated from his father.
- Vila Czarheit (ヴィラ・ツァールハイト, Vira Tsaaruhaito) : A young mage from the region of Invistake, born into the prestigious Czarheit family. She sets out on a journey to retrieve the "Grimoire," a book passed down through generations. Intelligent and polite, she's also a bit of an airhead. Her path crosses with Seltz's when she rescues him from Starklia Empire soldiers at the Azertolija Exposition, marking a turning point in her destiny.
- Blitz Vinte (ブリッツ・ヴィント, Burittsu Vinto) : A former elite soldier from Tekkon who now serves as Eizel's bodyguard. He's a brash and prideful young man with a strong sense of loyalty and a good heart, often acting as an older brother figure to Seltz. Blitz dreams of becoming the world's greatest swordsman.
- Kalulu von Atmigars (カルル・フォン・アトミガル, Karuru fon Atomigaru) : The young prince of Seewald. Playful, arrogant, and endearing, Kalulu loves adventuring though his poor sense of direction often gets him lost. He stumbles upon Seltz's group during one of his escapades and decides to join them.
- Gamut (ガミット, Gamitto) : An automaton created by the late Doctor Barnett. After witnessing his creator's death at the hands of a similar machine, Gamut mysteriously develops a heart. He journeys with Seltz to search for other robots and uncover the meaning of life.
- Ray Sonne (レイ・ゾンネ, Rei Zonne) : A mysterious and overconfident treasure hunter from Freiheidel, wielding twin sabers. She encounters Seltz's party during their travels and, impressed by Blitz's strength after a sparring match, decides to join them in search of rare treasures.

=== Other characters ===
- Carl Walzesta (カール・ヴァルツェスタ, Kaaru Varutsuesuta) : The 72nd Emperor of the Starklia Empire and the youngest prince in its history. Though kind-hearted, Carl is also a stern ruler who fights to reclaim control of his empire from the Senate, which currently holds the real power behind the throne.
- Jamosa (ジャモーサ, Jamoosa) : A general from Vals, known for her cheerful and talkative personality. She delivers a letter from the Pope to Seltz and supports him throughout his journey with her magical songs. Modeled after Jamosa.
- Richt (リヒト, Rihito) : A priest and the Pope's personal assistant. Soft-spoken and gentle on the surface, Richt conceals a sharp mind and strong ambitions. Continuing his father's research on the Divine Stone, he plots to retrieve the Wahlem from Gravina and sends troops to respond to the Starklia Empire's invasion.
- Lights (ライツ, Raitsu) : A narcissistic and cunning knight of the Starklia Empire, originally from Tekkon. He was once a close friend and fellow member of the Crimson Flash elite alongside Blitz, but betrayed them and was branded a fugitive.
- Vissense Tolar (ヴィッセンス・トラー, Vissensu Toraa) : The leader of the craftsmen town of Bergkentos and a longtime friend of Seltz's father. When his friend is falsely accused of terrorism and taken hostage by the Empire, Vissense races across Gravina in an effort to save him.
- Brandon Rare (ブランドン・レア, Burandon Rea) : The Director of Invistake's Magic College and Vila's mentor. Easygoing and warm, Brandon is nevertheless prone to forgetfulness. He is rarely seen without his loyal pet owl perched at his side.
- Stret (シュトレ, Shutore) : The Pope and spiritual leader of Vals. A kind and gentle figure, he relies heavily on his assistant Richt to manage the state's political

=== Development ===
According to producer Tsutomu Goda, the title Wahrheit, the German word for "truth", was chosen to reflect the game's strong thematic and aesthetic ties to German culture, evident in its character names, locations, and core narrative. The story centers on uncovering the "truth behind the war" and proving one's innocence, with a major focus on each character's personal growth and how their individual journeys drive the overarching plot. Additional themes explored include peace, enlightenment, justice, and the deeper meaning of justice itself.

The development team placed particular emphasis on character gestures and expressions to ensure that the emotional tone of each scene was clearly conveyed. In terms of setting, the team opted for a more traditional royal fantasy RPG atmosphere—intentionally contrasting the distinctive worldviews seen in Tales of Breaker and Tales of Commons. Voice recording proceeded smoothly, with most actors delivering their lines successfully in a single take. Kalulu's performance was noted as especially well-matched to the character, while Gamut's unique samurai-style speech posed a challenge at first for his voice actor.

== Tales of the World: Material Dungeon ==
Tales of the World: Material Dungeon is a dungeon crawling RPG, with a focus on changing costumes (similar to Tales of Phantasia: Narikiri Dungeon).

== Other games ==
=== Tales of VS. for MOBILE ===
Tales of VS. for MOBILE is an RPG, using a unique character creation system instead of existing Tales of characters. The player creates a character to confronting a series of enemies across a map, confronting them in a side-on battle with the options to "attack, defend, technique, or counter". The game appears to be turn-based, and bares little to no resemblance to its namesake, Tales of VS..

=== Tales of the World: Radiant Mythology Mobile ===
Tales of the World: Radiant Mythology Mobile is an RPG with real-time combat. While featuring characters from other games and a unique story, it is set in the world of Radiant Mythology. Players could unlock time-limited quests for this game by playing Tales of the World: Radiant Mythology 3, and unlock items for the PSP game in return, though this functionality ended on March 15, 2012.

=== Craymel Check ===
Craymel Check features characters known as "Craymels" (beings with considerable magical skill featured in several games in the Tales series) in a number of small mini-games. The artwork and character design of the craymels themselves are based on the ones from Tales of Eternia specifically.

=== Craymel Lab ===
Craymel Lab is a puzzle game that consists of the player moving falling blocks of different colors and shapes into an arrangement and making them disappear, similar in many ways to Tetris. Several character choices are available before the game begins, all of them being from a previous Tales game. Whichever character the player chooses determines what dialogue they will present as they play through the game's increasingly more difficult levels.

=== Groovy Arche ===
Groovy Arche is the same game featured in the PlayStation and PlayStation Portable remakes of Tales of Phantasia released only in Japan. The player must control the character Arche as she flies across a horizontally scrolling screen, moving up and down as well as side to side firing bolts of magic energy at enemies to defeat them. In each round, Arche can score more points by not only defeating a large number of monsters, but also by collecting several items that appear on the screen for a short amount of time. The game is over whenever Arche's health, indicated by the life bar on the top of the screen, is depleted.

=== Klondike ===
The Tales of the Mobile take on the traditional card game Klondike, a game similar to Solitaire that can be played by only one person. While playing the game, the Fairy character from Tales of Tactics offers her insight.

=== Mieu no Daibouken ===
ミュウの大冒険 (Mieu's Great Adventure) is an action role-playing game starring Mieu, the mascot of Tales of the Abyss. A total of twelve dungeons are available to the player for download.

=== Mieu no Fonic Gojiten ===
ミュウのフォニック語事典 (Mieu's Fonic Alphabet Encyclopedia) is a companion app for Tales of the Abyss, allowing players to decipher the fonic language found in the main game.

=== Mieu no Jikkenshitsu? ===
ミュウのじっけんしつ？ (Mieu's Experiments?) is a Cooking game starring Mieu, mascot of Tales of the Abyss. The player gives Mieu ingredients to create dishes with.

=== Reversi ===
Reversi is the Tales of Mobile version of the classic board game (also known as "Othello") that features characters from other Tales games playing against each other. Incidentally, Tales of Reversi, as part of a DVD special, was suggested as an actual game by Veigue Lungberg of Tales of Rebirth.

=== Scramble Land ===
Scramble Land is a card/board game that features characters from other Tales games playing against each other.

=== Tales of Quiz ===
Tales of Quiz is a quiz game with questions given by characters the Tales universe. Includes monthly updated questions and a national ranking for the player to participate in.

=== Tales of Wonder Casino ===
Tales of Wonder Casino features various minigames from casinos in the Tales series.

=== Whis Battle ===
Nearly identical to the minigame featured in Tales of Eternia, Whis Battle puts the player against other characters from that title in a card game. Each character takes turns playing a card from their hand onto the table, and only cards of the same color may be placed on one another. However, some cards are given two colors, and may be used to switch whichever card the next player must lay. If a player is unable to place a card, they must draw cards until they can play. The game ends when a player no longer has any cards in their hand.

In addition to featuring the Whis Card Game, the game is accompanied by several small story sequences involving characters from Tales of Eternia itself.
