= List of Ascendance of a Bookworm episodes =

Anime series

Ascendance of a Bookworm is an anime series based on a light novel and manga series written by Miya Kazuki and illustrated by Yō Shiina. The series is animated by Ajia-do Animation Works and directed by Mitsuru Hongo, with Mariko Kunisawa handling series composition, Yoshiaki Yanagida and Toshihisa Kaiya designing the characters, and Michiru composing the series' music. The first season ran for 14 episodes, which aired from October 3 to December 26, 2019, on ABC, Tokyo MX, Wowow, and BS Fuji. (Note: Wowow listed the show at 24:30 on October 2, which is 12:30 AM on October 3, 2019.) The opening theme is "Masshiro" (真っ白) performed by Sumire Morohoshi, while the ending theme is "Kamikazari no Tenshi" (髪飾りの天使) performed by Megumi Nakajima. The first season's OVA episode (numbered 14.5) consisting of two parts called "Eustachius's Incognito Operation Downtown" and "Visiting Missus Corinna" aired on March 9, 2020. The second season ran for 12 episodes, which aired from April 5 to June 21, 2020. Production of the third season was announced on July 12, 2020, which ran for 10 episodes, and aired from April 12 to June 14, 2022, on ytv. (Note: ytv listed the show at 26:29 on April 11, which is 2:29 AM on April 12, 2022.) The fourth season aired from April 4 to October 3, 2026. Yoshiaki Iwasaki is directing at Wit Studio. YTV and Nippon Television Network are broadcasting episodes, and Crunchyroll is streaming season four alongside the first three seasons.

== Series overview ==
Season	Episodes	Originally released	
Season	Episodes	First released	Last released
1	14	October 3, 2019	December 26, 2019
2	12	April 5, 2020	June 21, 2020
3	10	April 1, 2022	June 14, 2022
4	24	April 4, 2026	October 3, 2026

== Episode list ==
=== Season 1 (2019) ===
No. overall	No. in season	Title (Note: All English episode titles taken from Crunchyroll.)	Original release date
1	1	"A World Without Books"; Transliteration: "Hon no Nai Sekai" (Japanese: 本のない世界)	October 3, 2019
The High Priest of the temple puts a young girl named Myne into a deep sleep and probes her mind regarding her past and her abnormal love for books. He sees Myne was known as Motosu Urano from another world and time. She loved every kind of literature in existence, but one fateful day she was suddenly crushed to death under a pile of books during an earthquake. As she was dying, she wished she would be able to read all kinds of books in her next life. She hears a small voice crying out in pain before awakening in the body of the young girl named Myne who is bedridden due to a fever. Confused about her surroundings, she asks her new mother, Effa, and elder sister, Tuuli, where she can find books to read, but they don't seem to understand. When they leave to prepare dinner, Myne searches the house, but finds out it is only a small wooden cabin with no books in sight, or even any paper. After a few days, the only convenience Myne can find is by putting a pin in her long hair to keep it up, which surprises Tuuli. When Effa asks Myne to accompany her to the food market, she agrees, believing it to be a way to find books outside her home. Looking around the city, she realizes she lives in the slightly impoverished side of a classic medieval city known as Ehrenfest, and her father, Gunther, is a city border guard. When they reach the market, Myne finds a single book enclosed in a locked glass case at a stall. She asks the owner if she can see it, but the man tells her books are rare and only nobles are allowed to handle them. Undeterred, Myne says if she cannot buy books anywhere, she will have to make them herself.
2	2	"Life Improvements and Slates"; Transliteration: "Seikatsu Kaizen to Sekiban" (Japanese: 生活改善と石板)	October 10, 2019
Irritated by her ragged and itchy hair, Myne takes a fruit Tuuli bought at the market and extracts its oil and creates a basic shampoo to clean her hair. The next day, Gunther forgets a package at home, so Myne and Tuuli attempt to make the trek to his stationed gate to bring it to him. Outside their townhouse door, they meet Lutz, Ralph, and Fey, a family trio of boys who also live in the neighborhood. Exhausted from the walk outside, Myne collapses and is given a ride on Ralph's back to the gate. They reach the gate and deliver the package to Gunther, where the boys then split off to go cut wood in the forest. Gunter introduces Myne and Tuuli to his partner Otto, who suddenly pulls out a scroll made of animal hide. Intrigued, Myne asks her father to buy parchment for her, but is declined when he tells her she cannot read or write, as well its high cost. Otto offers to teach Myne to read and write on a small chalkboard-like slate, to which she then happily agrees. The season begins to cool, halting Myne's progress as she helps her family pack for the city's fall festival. The family travels to the festival location where Myne is forced to sit off to the side due to her frailty. She comes up with the idea of weaving fiber-like papyrus as a paper substitute, similar to what ancient Egyptians did, but before she can plan this out, she faints when she sees a pig slaughtered up close, causing Gunther to bring her back to the gate to Otto. After she wakes, Otto hands her the slate and writes her name for her in the new language so she can practice. As she practices, she begins to subconsciously write in Japanese and writes down the names of everyone she has met thus far. When Otto returns, he finds Myne passed out from a fever and rushes her home. At night, she encourages herself on her progress with writing before wondering what great idea she had before she suddenly fainted at the festival.
3	3	"The Events of Winter"; Transliteration: "Fuyu no Dekigoto" (Japanese: 冬のできごと)	October 17, 2019
Two months after Myne's consciousness came to the new world, winter struck the city hard and buried it in snow. Since every day is spent indoors, Myne attempts to shave the fibers off of twigs to weave into a pseudo-papyrus paper, but gives up after only three days of working due to the slow progress. Effa comes up with an idea for Myne to help weave baskets, to which Myne has prior knowledge of how to make from when she was back in Japan. Myne makes her basket with ease and surprises Tuuli and Effa with its efficiency, though Tuuli gets upset since she wants to become an apprentice seamstress and Myne appears to be better than her. Effa offers to teach Tuuli how to weave up to her 7th birthday, which is when the city's children become baptized and choose a profession. Effa tries to ring Myne in as well, but she politely declines in favor of her next goal, which is waiting until spring to make clay tablets similar to those of ancient Mesopotamia. The next morning, Tuuli and Gunther go and pick parues, which are fruit from completely iced-over trees. The fruit can be used as both a drinkable juice and its pulp is type of bird feed, but after accidentally tasting the feed and finding it edible, Myne figures out how to turn it into a type of pancake, which her family and the neighbor boys enjoy. At night, Effa and Tuuli begin to question where Myne is getting her ideas from, but Gunther says he prefers this Myne over a sad and sick one. At the same time, Myne's slate pencil wears itself out, so she asks Gunther to take her to the gate to get it replaced. He drops Myne off the next day, and Otto gives Myne a new pencil to work with. As Otto begins his work, Myne corrects him on a few calculations, surprising him. He asks her to help out, to which she agrees in exchange for a constant supply of slate pencils. At night, while Tuuli has a dress prepared for her upcoming baptism, Myne decides to create a hair ornament for her sister to look her best.
4	4	"Forests and Clay Tablets"; Transliteration: "Hajimete no Mori to Nendoban" (Japanese: 初めての森と粘土板)	October 24, 2019
Myne decides to cook dinner for the family and, using cooking techniques from Japan, surprises them on how good it is. Gunther and Effa decide on whether to show Myne to a cooking apprentice, but she heartily declines, stating she wants to go to the forest in search of clay. Her family eventually dissuade her, claiming she is not strong enough to go to the forest and she needs to build up her strength first. Later on, Gunther tells Myne that Otto has asked for her to be his calculations assistant, though it is unofficial since unbaptized children cannot work. She arrives at the gate to see Otto teaching a class of older kids how to write, and while it was awkward to start, the class warms up to Myne and eventually begin learning from her. After the students leave, Otto rewards her by teaching her how to write complete words. While she frequently got sick near the beginning, Myne eventually builds up her stamina enough to go to the forest, but ends up getting sick the day she was supposed to go. Once spring ended, Myne finally was able to go into the forest with Lutz's family and Tuuli. She begins digging for clay, but is caught by Lutz, who after scolding her for not resting, helps her find the right spots to dig. They find a hot spot for clay, allowing Myne to collect and flatten them out into many individual tablets to write on. Myne completes a story Effa tells her when she is sick onto the tablets and leaves them out to dry, but Lutz's brothers crush them, believing them to be cushions. Heartbroken, Myne begins to mysteriously glow as she shouts and berates the boys, before Lutz arrives and calms her down. As she sadly begins digging again, Lutz orders the boys to help her as penance. They are able to recreate the tablets, but they are washed away in the rain the next day. As they build the clay book for a third time, Lutz and Myne exchange their dreams for the future; Lutz to be a traveling merchant and Myne a librarian. They complete the tablets and Myne brings them home to harden in the fireplace, but they instantly shatter, causing Myne to shout in frustration.
5	5	"Baptisms and Strange Fevers"; Transliteration: "Senrei-shiki to Fushigi na Netsu" (Japanese: 洗礼式と不思議な熱)	October 31, 2019
Tuuli's baptism day arrives and her hair ornament is the talk of the neighborhood. Though he wants to stay and watch the parade, Gunther is forced to work, so he brings Myne with him to the gate. While there, a messenger arrives while Otto is away, but Myne offers to read and deliver the message to Otto, surprising the messenger. At night, as Tuuli tells everyone about her day, Gunther presents with her a sewing kit as a gift. He also gives Myne a knife and tells her she will now be the house helper instead. However, she comes up with the idea to carve tree bark into wooden planks to write on, similar to ancient China. The next day, she goes into the forest with Lutz and begins carving her planks, but to low success. Lutz decides to help, but in exchange for an opportunity to meet Otto to discuss being a traveling merchant. Myne asks Otto about the traveling trade, but Otto states it isn't a good profession for a city child, although he agrees to talk with Lutz about it. Myne collects all the planks and brings them to her family storage room to dry. She then thinks about what to write with and comes up with the idea to use soot. Mixing soot with clay, Myne creates a basic black pencil to use to write on the planks, but when she arrives home, the planks are gone since Effa unknowingly used them for firewood. Distraught, Myne begins to mysteriously glow again, but suddenly collapses with a terrible fever. Lutz arrives and cheers Myne up, telling her to keep moving forward. While she stays in bed, Lutz brings her bamboo strips to work on, but Effa burns them as well, believing them to be more kindling for the fire. Myne starts to glow again and contemplates giving up entirely, but the thought of Lutz helping her persuades her to keep trying. As she calms down, her fever does also, begging her to question what sort of sickness her body really has. Once she's healed, Myne meets with Otto and they plan a day for Lutz and Otto to meet.
6	6	"Meeting"; Transliteration: "Kaigō" (Japanese: 会合)	November 7, 2019
Before their meeting with Otto, Myne decides to wash Lutz's hair with her shampoo so he can look his best. Afterwards, she asks why he wants to be a traveling merchant, but he responds with his own questions regarding what she wants to do. She informs him she changed her goal from selling books to selling paper, hinting she wants his help. The meeting day arrives, but Otto shows up with an old partner named Benno, a city merchant and former traveling trader. Benno becomes immediately interested in children's clean hair and Myne's hair pin, but she says the details are a secret. Otto deters Lutz from becoming a traveling merchant because he may lose his citizenship, meaning they cannot reside in any city or have any sort of luxury. Coming to terms with this, Lutz decides to help Myne make paper and sell it. Myne reveals her idea for making paper from plants and selling them for profit, though Benno questions its authenticity. Myne promises a prototype before her baptism and Benno agrees to sponsor her if it comes true. Myne goes over what tools she needs and asks Lutz to find a suitable tree to use to extract its fibers. Otto offers to give Myne nails to use to build her tools in exchange for the use of her shampoo for his wife. She agrees and meets his wife Corinna, an executive in the Seamstress Guild and Benno's sister, and washes her hair for the nails. Myne and Lutz try to build their tools, but can't get the exact proportions quite right. At the gate, Otto gives Myne and Lutz invitations from Benno to meet with him, when suddenly Otto remembers from their meeting Benno believes Myne's illness is called the "Devouring" and is fatal.
7	7	"Seeds of Suspicion"; Transliteration: "Fushinkan no Mebae" (Japanese: 不信感の芽生え)	November 14, 2019
Lutz and Myne make their way through the wealthy side of the city to Benno's office, amazed by the grandeur around them. They arrive at his building and have lunch with him, where he scolds them for going to Otto for nails and advice instead of himself. After Myne apologizes, Benno offers to create all the tools necessary to create the paper for the duo, but in exchange for the rights to Myne's shampoo. Myne agrees, but she also wants Lutz and herself to have all the rights to the paper once it becomes a profitable product, to which Benno agrees. They write out the order forms and sign a binding magical contract with Benno. On their way home, Lutz starts to become suspicious of who Myne is given the detailed discussion she had with Benno and how Lutz didn't understand any of it. Myne becomes increasingly anxious about giving herself away to those around her, and decides if she's going to let the fever take her, it'll be after the completes her paper. She meets with Mark, Benno's assistant, to discuss a possible workshop stationed near the forest gate, but suddenly collapses. She awakens in Benno's home where he orders her to be accompanied by Lutz at all times when going out for work. After she heads home, Benno explains to Otto the Devouring is manifested in commoner children who develop mana and rarely survive to their baptism. The next day, Myne and Lutz arrive at Benno's office where he says they have a workshop ready for them, but she is to do none of the heavy lifting.
8	8	"Lutz's Myne"; Transliteration: "Ruttsu no Main" (Japanese: ルッツのマイン)	November 21, 2019
Myne and Lutz arrive at their new workshop, and as they begin to put things in order, Myne is relieved to see Lutz acting normal towards her. Their first task is to create a bamboo strainer, but are not skilled enough to build it themselves. They delegate tasks between a lumberer to build tools and a craftsman to make the strainer, but after negotiating with them, Lutz again becomes suspicious of Myne's identity. Once their tools are ready, the pair venture out into the woods to extract tree fibers. While Lutz cuts down trees, Myne is suddenly attacked by a carnivorous weed known as a trombe, which will constantly grow and sprout even after it is cut down. Lutz calls his brothers, and they eventually chop the trombe to pieces. Realizing its potential, Myne uses the scattered trombe twigs as her base and easily peels the fibers off. After planning the next steps, Lutz tells Myne they need to talk after the paper is completed, causing her to worry. During each step of making the paper, Lutz becomes increasingly suspicious of Myne given how she seems to know what she is doing with no previous experience. After a few days of working, they finish the paper and Myne agrees to talk. She informs him she is not the Myne he once knew. When he asks for her to return the original Myne, she says if she does, all that will remain is a corpse. Myne adds while she herself is not the cause of the fever, the fever itself led to the original's demise and it is eating away at her as well. When Lutz starts to blame the new identity, Myne retorts claiming she never wanted this, and she was given this fate when she died in her own world. She lets him decide whether or not to let her be taken by the fever since he was the one who saved her after her mother kept burning her ideas. Conflicted, Lutz asks how long she has been Myne, but figures out it was when she added the pin to her hair, nearly a year prior. He ultimately allows the new Myne to stay and chooses to let her family decide her fate since the current Myne is the one he mostly remembers at this point. They bring their paper prototypes to Benno, who after testing them, gives them a passing grade and allows them to be his apprentices.
9	9	"The Guild Master's Granddaughter"; Transliteration: "Girudo-chō no Magomusume" (Japanese: ギルド長の孫娘)	November 28, 2019
Benno and Mark teaches Myne and Lutz how the currency works in the world from small bronze coins to silver coins up to large gold coins before giving the pair their share for creating the paper. Myne asks how much her hair ornaments could be worth to sell commercially, deciding it to be their winter merchandise. Benno brings them to the Merchant Guild to meet the head executive Gustav, who he has a rivalry with. While they wait to be seen, Myne learns the layout of the city and the surrounding land to become more acquainted for the future. They meet with Gustav, who is initially against the unbaptized children becoming apprentices until they present him with the hair ornament. He relents and allows them to be registered in exchange for the ornament for his granddaughter's upcoming baptism. After deciding a price, Gustav attempts to ring in Myne to work for him instead of Benno, but she declines. After learning how much money Benno weaseled out of Gustav, Myne learns from him to always be searching for ways to increase your income. Lutz and Myne arrange to meet with Gustav's granddaughter Freida to present her with the ornament, to which she has wanted ever since she saw Tuuli wear one the previous year. Since Freida has pigtails for her hair, Myne offers to sell her two ornaments; one at full price and the second one at half price. Freida accepts, but believes Myne is missing out on profit, similar to what Benno told her earlier. Just like her grandfather, Freida attempts to ring in Myne to her family business, but Myne again declines. They present Freida with her ornaments and prepare to leave in case of Myne's sickness, but Freida asks if she has the Devouring. She explains it is a fever-like illness that eats the host from the inside, and when Myne asks how she knows, Freida says she has it as well. When Myne asks how to cure it, Freida says it cannot be cured, but can only be contained with either expensive medicine or if the host has clear motivation and not become depressed. Myne thanks her for her advice and the pair prepares to leave.
10	10	"To the Second Winter"; Transliteration: "Futatabi-me no Fuyu ni Mukete" (Japanese: 二度目の冬に向けて)	December 5, 2019
Hitting the one year mark since her arrival, Myne is bedridden while her family prepares for the fall festival again. As she lies in bed, she suddenly begins to feel the Devouring bubbling inside her, but quickly forces it down. Her family and Lutz return home with food from the festival and are glad to see her health returning. Myne and Lutz go over the training process for apprentices, which include etiquette, literacy, and the ability to perform calculations. The pair ask Benno how to look proper, who tells them to completely overhaul their wardrobe using the money they have accumulated so far. Benno then asks Myne for help with the shampoo-making process since production is not going well. She figures out the issue and when asked what to do with the unused oil they have made thus far, Myne says she will sell them as a different product for a jokingly high price, to which Benno shockingly accepts. When asked why, he tells her it is for her Devouring medication and she should potentially be ready to sell everything she owns for it. Myne tells Benno everything he needs to know for the shampoo, causing him to ask her who she is and how she knows it all, but she refuses to say. The following day, Myne goes to the gate to practice writing words with Otto, but when he is called to deal with a trombe threat, the Devouring attempts to return again, forcing her to push it down. Later, as she and Lutz prepare the workshop for winter and set up bark hides to dry, but the Devouring appears a third time, forcing Myne to suppress it, worrying Lutz in the process. She explains it appears frequently nowadays, even when she is not disheartened, but the only real remedy is the expensive medicine. They return to Benno's office where Lutz begs him to save Myne since he himself cannot do anything for her. Benno retorts saying he can help her by manning up and not giving her anything to worry about. Lutz asks Myne if she wants to sell any more of her homemade products, to which she agrees and brings Otto her weaving basket. They discuss other consumable products, when suddenly Myne begins to glow and collapses as the Devouring explodes inside her.
11	11	"Life-or-Death Choices and Family Meetings"; Transliteration: "Kyūkyoku no Sentaku to Kazoku Kaigi" (Japanese: 究極の選択と家族会議)	December 12, 2019
Myne awakens in Freida's bed and notices a shattered bracelet on her wrist. Freida walks in and tells her how the bracelet was a magical item absorbing the Devouring fever, but her illness will soon return within a year. When Myne asks where she can get more, Freida reveals her family bought every faulty one in the city and the real bracelets are carried by nobles. Freida gives her an ultimatum: make a contract with the nobles and live but leave her family behind, or stay with her family and die. She also reveals she has a contract to be a future concubine to a noble and is at peace with the decision. Myne thanks Gustav for saving her, but he tells her the item she used is worth a large amount of money, which she agrees to pay thanks to her deals with Benno, surprising Gustav since he believed she could not and would be forced to work for him instead. Myne spends the rest of the day cooking sweets and playing with Freida before leaving with her family the following morning, who believe Myne is completely cured. She and Lutz arrive at Benno's office where he scolds her for cooking with sugar while she was with Freida since it is actually a rare commodity. Myne notices how busy Benno's shop is during the winter months and ponders making classic Japanese games to sell over the next year. At night at home, she presents her baptismal outfit to Gunther before telling her family the truth about the Devouring and her time limit. After discussing the option of moving in among the nobles with her family, she decides to stay with her family with the time she has left.
12	12	"Baptism and Divine Paradises"; Transliteration: "Senrei-shiki to Kami no Rakuen" (Japanese: 洗礼式と神の楽園)	December 19, 2019
As the seasons begin to warm, Myne arranges to end her apprenticeship with Benno and sells the rights of the paper-making process to him. Lutz decides to continue his apprenticeship as a merchant under Benno after convincing his mother he will not follow the family trade into craftsmanship. Myne then meets with Freida, who is surprised and saddened by Myne's decision to stay with her family and die. Since she wants to accumulate enough money for her family to be happy before she goes, Myne agrees to sell all her recipes for cooking with sugar to Freida, who tearfully accepts. Soon after, Myne's baptismal day arrives, so she meets Lutz and parades down the main street with the city's other children toward the city temple. There, the children register for citizenship and learn about the religious history of their world. Afterwards, the clergy and children offer a prayer to the world's gods and goddesses, but the humorous poses required cause Myne to laugh hysterically, resulting in her being taken away under the guise of being ill. She awakens in an unknown room and proceeds to wander around the halls before stumbling across the temple library, but is unable to enter since only clergy are allowed. Myne meets with the High Bishop, who says admission to work at the temple comes with a sizable donation. Myne offers one large gold coin, the highest currency, shocking him. He follows up by requiring her parents' approval, but agrees even if they say no, she is welcome to come by and read anytime she wants.
13	13	"The Choice to Be an Apprentice Priestess"; Transliteration: "Miko Minarai to Iu Sentakushi" (Japanese: 巫女見習いという選択肢)	December 26, 2019
Lutz scolds Myne as she rests in a temple bed for collapsing from excitement after finding out she can become a temple librarian. When she arrives home and tells her family about her plan, however, Gunther angrily refuses to allow her to go and convinces her the priestesses are for orphans that must stay at the temple. As Myne comes to terms with this, the Devouring begins to bubble up inside her due to her inner turmoil of choosing between books and family. A few days later, Myne returns to the temple to turn down the offer and meets the High Priest. Together, they read the religious scripture until the High Bishop arrives, who is puzzled by Myne's decision to refuse his offer. When she reveals she has the Devouring, the High Bishop frantically brings out a large golden grail. When Myne touches the goblet, it suddenly glows red, and the religious pair ask to meet with Myne's parents at a later date. Myne and Lutz then go to Benno, who demands Myne explain to him everything that happened at the temple. After she does, Benno reveals she is strongly targeted by the temple because they are short on mana due to a governmental conflict, and wish to use her Devouring as a sort of refuel in exchange for her desire of books. He informs her this will save her life, and recommends binding a magical contract with Lutz and Benno so she will be able to have contact with them while with the temple. Myne registers at the guild to create a constant supply of income for her and Benno's profits, but on their way home, Lutz tearfully laments not being able to make books with Myne anymore. Myne apologizes, but retorts he will always be her first choice if she ever has a problem and claims to still desire to make her own books with his help.
14	14	"Conclusions"; Transliteration: "Ketchaku" (Japanese: 決着)	December 26, 2019
Myne tells her parents about the meeting with the temple clergy regarding her apprenticeship, and also reveals how she would live as a noble in exchange for her Devouring to fuel the temple's mana supply. She recalls to them how Benno advised to use any means necessary to improve her life and fight for her dreams, including the option to abuse her illness in order to be treated as a noble. Gunther agrees, but Tuuli and Effa are fearful of the potential consequences of negotiating with the temple nobility. Myne and her parents arrive at the temple and meet the High Priest and the High Bishop, but when he realizes they aren't wealthy, the High Bishop's attitude suddenly becomes condescending and arrogant. After refusing to give Myne to the temple without having their demands met, Myne's parents are attacked by the temple's guards and Myne is to be taken by force. As Gunther is about to be overwhelmed, Myne begins to glow and attacks the High Bishop with a semi-psychic power. She knocks him unconscious, but as she goes in for the kill, the High Priest stands in her way and calms her down. The High Priest apologizes for not stopping the High Bishop's aggression and brings the family to his room for discussions. There, he explains to Myne's the sudden explosion of power is called the "Crushing" and occurs when the host of the Devouring lets their emotions overwhelm them. When asked why she isn't already dead, Myne says she used a broken magical item to stay alive, but refused to form a contract with a noble since it would deprive her of her way of life. Moved by her words, the High Priest agrees to the family's conditions and allows Myne to become a member of the temple with full benefits. Myne returns home to Lutz and Tuuli and tearfully hugs them with joy.
Side Stories (OVA)
14.5 (Part 1)	OVA–1 (Part 1)	"Side Story One: Eustachius's Incognito Operation Downtown"; Transliteration: "Yusutokusu no Shitamachi Sen'nyū Dai-sakusen" (Japanese: ユストクスの下町潜入大作戦)	March 10, 2020
14.5 (Part 2)	OVA–1 (Part 2)	"Side Story Two: Visiting Missus Corinna"; Transliteration: "Korinna-sama no O-Taku Hōmon" (Japanese: コリンナ様のお宅訪問)	March 10, 2020

=== Season 2 (2020) ===
No. overall	No. in season	Title	Original release date
15	1	"Apprentice Priestess"; Transliteration: "Shinden no Miko Minarai" (Japanese: 神殿の巫女見習い)	April 5, 2020
Myne returns to Benno's shop to tell him the news of her apprenticeship, only to find Lutz working as an assistant as part of his apprenticeship. When she meets Benno, she reveals how all of her terms, including living at home, being treated as a noble, and maintaining her paper-making studio, are considered, as well as her access to the temple's library. On the way home, Myne hears about a strange man looking for her and is told to be cautious. That night, Gunther meets with Otto to discuss their future, only for Otto to reveal he's been offered a position by Benno to help support his newborn child. The next day, Benno reveals that someone broke into the Merchant Guild, and the suspect is most likely a spy from the temple who's looking for Myne. He also finds out that Freida bought Myne's recipe for cooking with sugar, much to his chagrin due to a lack of supplies and accessibility, but plans to make her a future offer. At the temple, the High Priest reports his spy's findings to the High Bishop, promoting her potential high value, but the High Bishop counters with plans to abuse Myne for her mana. The day of Myne's inauguration arrives, but as she walks the halls of the temple, she hears derogatory commoner remarks aimed in her direction. She meets with the High Priest, recites the prayer to be an apprentice, and is handed her blue robes, the sign of clergy coming from a noble family. She then meets her three attendants, called "retainers", which include a quiet young man named Fran, a conceited young girl named Delia, and a pompous young boy named Gil, all who wear gray-robed uniforms, indicating the lowest level member of the temple. When the High Priest is called away, it is determined that, while Gil is brash and Fran is devoted to the temple, Delia is secretly out to get Myne, per the High Bishop's orders.
16	2	"Blue Robes and Uncommon Sense"; Transliteration: "Aoi Koromo to Kotonaru Jōshiki" (Japanese: 青い衣と異なる常識)	April 12, 2020
The High Priest informs Myne of her duties as a blue-robed priest and shows her an item that will absorb her mana donations to the temple. After finalizing the deal, Myne, accompanied by her retainers, make their way to the library so she can memorize the scriptures, though she ends up distancing herself from them out of distrust. Upon entering the library, she blissfully reads the scripture the entire day, even threatening Gil with her powers when he attempts to take her away for lunch. As the day comes to an end, Myne meets with Lutz en route Benno's, but is delayed when her retainers attempt to follow, forcing her to order them away and tell Delia to give the High Bishop a message about her mana donations. At Benno's, Myne is advised to learn all she can about being a noble, before Benno realizes that the temple expects the monetary donation immediately. He and Myne arrive at the temple and meet with the High Priest to discuss Myne's background. After the discussions, an agreement was made for the temple to earn a portion of Myne's paper-making business, before Myne suddenly collapses. As she is carried out, she makes amends with Fran and earns his trust, all the while Delia and Gil continue to spite her for their own personal gains and reasons.
17	3	"Needs"; Transliteration: "Ataerubeki Mono" (Japanese: 与えるべきもの)	April 19, 2020
Lutz is introduced to Myne's retainers when he drops her off at the temple, but gets into a fight with Gil when Myne is nearly injured due to the young retainer's actions. During the scuffle, Myne learns that Gil hasn't been able to eat as she commutes from home instead of sharing her temple food with her retainers, though Delia and Fran can eat since they work for the temple leaders. Myne is gifted an abandoned two-story office as her quarters, and directs Gil to clean it so he can work for his food, as well as so she can evaluate his productivity. When Myne later arrives at the office, she finds the top floor spotless and praises Gil, earning his trust. When the High Bishop learns of Myne's new office, he ridicules Delia for not informing him and kicks her out, causing her vendetta against Myne to grow. Myne brings the boys out for lunch, showing them the customs of the city, and meets with Benno. They all return to Myne's office and utilize the oven found in there to create pizza. As they eat, Delia arrives and berates them regarding the High Bishop's treatment of her, blaming Myne for the ordeal. When she realizes that she isn't needed, Delia pleads with Myne to keep her and that she will devote herself to her, to which Myne accepts, earning Delia's trust. Later on, in an underground part of the temple, someone appears to be eating Myne's pizza.
18	4	"Orphanage Reforms"; Transliteration: "Koji'in no Dai-kaikaku" (Japanese: 孤児院の大改革)	April 26, 2020
One day, Myne asks Gil to guide her to the orphanage area of the temple so she can see it for herself. However, they arrive at a locked underground bunker to see many of the children malnourished and bordering on insanity. Myne learns that the temple dismissed the previous priestess of the orphanage, forcing the children to exist aimlessly and starving, surviving off the leftovers Gil provides them. Though she wants to help, she doesn't have the funds or means to do so, nor the temple's approval. Later that day, Myne and Fran meet with Lutz and discuss the problem, only for Lutz to come up with the idea to turn the orphanage into a working branch of their paper-making studio. With Benno's advice, Myne arranges a meeting with the High Priest to become the orphanage director and to set up her studio for the orphans. However, he begins by reprimanding her for her lack of noble decorum and to be wary of retainers and other blue robed priests who are loyal to the High Bishop. He then accepts her request to be orphanage director before revealing that he, like Myne, joined the temple later in life for personal reasons. With the support of her retainers, Myne heads over to the orphanage and officially begins her role as director.
19	5	"Cleanups and Star Festivals"; Transliteration: "Daisōji to Hoshimatsuri" (Japanese: 大掃除と星祭り)	May 3, 2020
Under the leadership of Myne, Fran, and Gil, the orphanage is rebuilt and establishes of rule of rewarding those who work. The children go foraging for paper supplies in the forest with Gunther and Lutz, and are rewarded by Myne for their productivity and hard work. Myne's three retainers are gifted slates and pencils to practice their writing while the rest of the children were given flashcards to play with made of the wood they collected in the forest, which Benno quickly buys the rights to. While on a walk with Lutz, Myne learns that Lutz and his brother Seig have grown distant, and that the annual Star Festival is approaching, though Myne is curious if the orphans are able to attend. When she asks the High Priest about this, he informs her that the temple is open to the townspeople during the festival and that the orphans would normally be kept quiet, but allows them to partake in the town's festivities of throwing fruit at each other within the temple grounds as long as they don't cause any problems. When the day of the ceremony arrives, however, the fruit that was collected suddenly turns into a pod of trombe sprouts when touched by Myne. Lutz and the orphans quickly slay the predatory plant, then proceed to throw the fruit at one another to celebrate. At the end of the day, Myne ends up sick and is carried home by Fran. When she returns to the temple, the High Priest reveals that the temple grounds required some repair from the celebration and that he knew of the trombe attack, forcing Myne into detention for breaking her promise, though Fran's protest fell on deaf ears. At the end of the day, Myne ends up sick again, causing the High Priest to realize that Fran was protesting out of safety for Myne's health and begins to regret his punishment to Myne due to her frailty.
20	6	"The Path Ahead of Lutz"; Transliteration: "Ruttsu no Iku Michi" (Japanese: ルッツの行く道)	May 10, 2020
After being refused to travel with Benno to another town for work, Lutz runs away from home, cuts off all contact with his family, and starts living in the attic of Benno's shop. After Myne recovers from her illness, she goes to the office and discovers that Benno is considering adopting Lutz as his son so that he can devote his life to the business. At the temple, the ordeal affects Myne's work with the High Priest, so she relays the details to him about what's been going on. After giving it some thought, he proposes to bring Lutz's parents to the temple so they can sign away Lutz for adoption. All parties involved are brought before the High Priest for discussions, including Lutz, his parents, and Benno. The talks take a turn and it is revealed that Lutz's parents actually supported his choices, even though it was against their wishes, and only want him to be safe and to grow up strong. Lutz apologizes for everything and Benno decides to swap his adoption idea to instead raise Lutz as his successor in the Merchant Guild, to which everyone agrees. Lutz reunites with his family while Myne cries tears of joy for everything turning out well, and later finds out the High Priest's name is Ferdinand.
21	7	"New Retainers"; Transliteration: "Atarashii Sobadzukae" (Japanese: 新しい側仕え)	May 17, 2020
Myne learns that her mother, Effa, is pregnant, so she wants to create a picture book for the new baby as a gift. Though she initially only wanted a gray-robed retainer named Wilma to help her draw and paint, Myne is given an additional retainer named Rosina to teach her music. As a precursor, Ferdinand teaches Myne to play the harspiel, a bandura-like instrument, so that she can blend more into the nobility. Myne retrieves Rosina, who appears to be loyal and honest, but it soon becomes apparent that she asks others to do her work due to her previous retainership. Myne holds a meeting between all her retainers, including input from Wilma who worked alongside Rosina with their previous mistress, to discuss how to move forward with Rosina. Myne gives Rosina the ultimatum of working and serving or returning to the orphanage, and she decides to stay and work while still teaching Myne music. After successfully playing a song for Ferdinand, Myne discovers that Wilma is uncomfortable around the presence of men due to a traumatic event in her past.
22	8	"Wilma and Holy Scriptures for Kids"; Transliteration: "Viruma to Kodomo-yō Seiten" (Japanese: ヴィルマと子供用聖典)	May 24, 2020
Myne decides to create the picture book based on the scriptures of the temple so that both her upcoming newborn sibling and the orphans can read it. However, she runs into an obstacle when she realizes ink is a rare commodity, so Myne decides to make her own using oil and soot from the town's fireplaces. With Ferdinand's approval of the picture book's contents, Myne has Wilma draw the images, but the final result is too detailed and ends up vague and blurry. In a fit of both frustration and due to her fear of men, Wilma accidentally lashes out at an orphan boy when asked to come see the studio that finalizes her drawings. Myne changes the book to be more simple in its design and has Wilma draw it again before hearing from the orphans about Wilma's recent odd behavior. While showing off the new design to Ferdinand, Myne realizes he is catching on to her abnormally adult-like etiquette, given how she understands the complexities of the temple scriptures enough to summarize them into a picture format. Wilma finishes the picture and asks to join Myne in the studio to see it completed, as well as to help conquer her fear of men. After accomplishing this feat, Wilma finishes the rest of the picture book and sends it off to Myne, who has Tuuli put the finishing touches on it by binding all the pages together. Finally, two years after arriving in the new world, Myne has created her first book.
23	9	"Harvest Festivals and Staying Home"; Transliteration: "Shūkaku-sai no Orusuban" (Japanese: 収穫祭のお留守番)	May 31, 2020
While en route to the library, Myne encounters a blue-robed priest loyal to the High Bishop. Myne peacefully steps aside, but later finds the library destroyed and blames him for the ordeal. After consulting with Ferdinand, Myne learns that all the blue-robed priests are away for the Harvest Festival, so she decides to clean the library herself and organize it however she wishes. After finishing up, Myne realizes special books on magic are missing, but Ferdinand reassures her that they are in his room, but asks to speak with her regarding her classification system of the books. Myne reveals her use of the Dewey Decimal System, which confuses Ferdinand, but he reveals to her that magic is only for nobles who graduate from the Royal Academy. Later, Myne and Lutz bring a picture book to Benno, who immediately wants to begin to sell them for profit, but Myne refuses since she wants to create actual literature books to sell, but doesn't have the right tools yet. As the winter months approach, Myne intends to work from home and create accessories for the orphanage, but Ferdinand reveals that the annual temple Dedication Ceremony occurs during winter and requires a vast amount of mana to complete. As such, he denies her request to live at home and orders her to stay at the temple.
24	10	"Knight Orders and Requests"; Transliteration: "Kishi-dan kara no Yōsei" (Japanese: 騎士団からの要請)	June 7, 2020
Though Ferdinand holds firm on requiring Myne to stay at the temple, he offers the concession that her family can come visit to check on her. Myne tells her family about her required stay at the temple over winter, only for them to react poorly, particularly Gunther. He and the rest of the family eventually concedes after Myne explains that the only reason she's alive is because of the temple taking her in, and follows it with her responsibilities for the children of the orphanage. While preparing for a new picture book at the temple, Fran informs Myne that she needs to prepare for the Knights' Order, a group from the Noble’s Quarter of Ehrenfest, by memorizing the necessary prayers and completing her ceremonial robes. During a meeting with a newly returned Ferdinand from the Harvest Festival, he suddenly receives a message that the Knights' Order requires immediate assistance with a raid and a blessing. Once dressed, Myne meets with a knighted Ferdinand to the Noble's Gates, receives a prayer ring, and they enter the Noble’s Quarter. Greeted by the Knights' Order captain, Karstedt, the group fly away to take on a massive rampaging trombe. Myne is given two guards, Damuel and Shikikoza, to protect her as she prays for the knight's safety. As they fly off to battle, Shikikoza suddenly mocks Myne's prayer as useless and sneers at her.
25	11	"Trombe and Battles"; Transliteration: "Toronbe Tōbatsu" (Japanese: トロンベ討伐)	June 14, 2020
Shikikoza dismisses Myne's prayer as folly, but Damuel comforts her by claiming that her prayer will aid in the battle. The knights begin their assault on the trombe, using mana-infused weapons to inflict heavy damage. As the battle turns in the knight's favor, Damuel explains how the weapons work, as well as hints at Ferdinand's past within the Knights' Order. Upon victory, Shikikoza remarks about Myne's plebeian status before ultimately attempting to maim her as a lesson for plebeians to know their place below nobles. Myne attempts to call for help, but is cut by Shikikoza's blade, causing her to bleed. Upon her blood hitting the ground, a trombe grows in its exact spot and wraps itself around Myne. Ferdinand arrives, but is unable to cut the trombe down while Myne's wound is open. He closes it and has the rest of the knights chop down the monster without harming Myne. An open interrogation occurs to figure out what happened, and when it seems like Shikikoza is about to get away with his actions due to his higher nobility, Ferdinand chimes in as the highest ranking noble and reprimands the entire Order, including Karstedt. As they fly to the center of the Trombe's crater, Ferdinand reminds Myne of her importance and that she should learn to treat herself accordingly.
26	12	"Dreamlike World"; Transliteration: "Yume no Sekai" (Japanese: 夢の世界)	June 21, 2020
As penance for his transgression, Ferdinand has Shikikoza heal and replenish the area due to the events of the battle. When he is unable to do so, Myne steps in and completes the healing ritual, shocking the entire Knight's Order and renewing their faith in her. Upon returning to the city of Ehrenfest, Myne asks for a new set of ceremonial robes since hers were damaged, as well as a lenient sentencing for Damuel since he tried to help her. After being bedridden due to a fever from her strenuous venture, Myne returns to the temple as autumn wanes to find Ferdinand asking for her. She meets with him, is given a drink, and places a tiara on her head, putting her into a deep sleep. Ferdinand then probes her mind, curious about her past and her abnormal behavior and love for books, and finds out about Myne's past life in Japan where she was Motosu Urano. He realizes that her love for books came from the abundance of literature in the world, and happens upon Urano's troubled relationship with her mother. Myne, who saw everything Ferdinand was seeing, overwhelms the mind sync with her emotions and forces Ferdinand to stop. Upon returning to the present, Myne hugs Ferdinand tightly and thanks him for seeing her memories with her. He later meets with Karstedt and discusses what he saw in the mind sync, as well as her unprecedented value to Ehrenfest, and asks Karstedt to adopt her to protect her from any potential threats. Back home, Myne thanks each member of her family for being there for her as a way to internally thank her mother back in Japan for the same reason. The next day, Myne returns to the temple to have a music lesson with Rosina, while Gil and the orphans create new books.
Recap episodes
26.5 (Part 1)	Recap–1	"Re-Ascendance of a Bookworm Part 1"; Transliteration: "Honzuki no Sai Gekokujou Sono 1" (Japanese: 本好きの再下剋上その 1)	March 28, 2022
Recap of the first season.
26.5 (Part 2)	Recap–2	"Re-Ascendance of a Bookworm Part 2"; Transliteration: "Honzuki no Sai Gekokujou Sono 2" (Japanese: 本好きの再下剋上その 2)	March 28, 2022
Recap of the second season.

=== Season 3 (2022) ===
No. overall	No. in season	Title	Original release date
27	1	"The Beginning of Winter"; Transliteration: "Fuyu no Hajimari" (Japanese: 冬の始まり)	April 11, 2022 (Note: This episode aired at 2:40 a.m. JST, 11 minutes after the original air time.)
Myne prepares to overwinter at the Cathedral and sells her book to Benno for money for clothes. Johann, an apprentice blacksmith who does detail work for Myne's products, begs her to be his patron to become a full blacksmith. Shes agrees on the condition that he make her metal letter types for a letter press. The Ink Guild has issues with Myne's woodblock printing ink being a threat to their business, and she sells the recipe and production rights to them to avoid trouble; however, they attack Lutz, evidently having other, mysterious motives. To keep her and her family safe, Myne moves into the Cathedral earlier than planned.
28	2	"The Story About Winter Stays and the Future"; Transliteration: "Fuyu Gomori to Kongo no Hanashi" (Japanese: 冬籠もりと今後の話)	April 18, 2022 (Note: This episode aired at 2:32 a.m. JST, 3 minutes after the original air time.)
Myne struggles to adjust to living without her family and is very lonely without them as winter sets in. Benno visits for a meeting with Head Priest Ferdinand, along with Karstedt and Damuel, to discuss the Ink Guild's motives and goals. After, Damuel is assigned as Myne's personal guard after having been demoted to an apprentice knight as a result of the incident with Shikikoza. To further keep Myne and her family safe, Ferdinand explains she will have to be adopted by a noble, which she vehemently rejects and loses control of her mana. Ferdinand eventually agrees to allow her to wait until she is ten years old (of age to attend the Royal Academy), but that she is too powerful to be left alone.
29	3	"The Dedication Ceremony and Spring Arrives"; Transliteration: "Hōnōshiki to Haru no Otozure" (Japanese: 奉納式と春の訪れ)	April 25, 2022
Myne introduces Damuel to her attendants, as well at Lutz and Tulli when she arrives to study reading/writing with the orphans. Delia is shown to still be delivering information on Myne to the High Bishop, though she is brushed off by another attendant. The Dedication Ceremony begins, which takes several days to fill chalices with mana. The High Bishop orders Myne to fill additional chalices under orders of the lord of Ehrenfest, but Ferdinand is doubtful this is true. Johann finishes and presents Myne with the letter types, to her delight. Wolf, the leader of the Ink Guild, is found dead after Karstedt is tasked with investigating who his client is that wants information on Myne, pointing to a coverup. Ferdinand thus pushes to have Myne extend her stay at the Cathedral until they are sure the danger has passed, and informs her parents of the future adoption. Prep for the Spring Prayer continues until the day they are to leave, where they are accompanied by Karstedt and an unknown blue robed priest, who immediately teases Myne for her small stature.
30	4	"Spring Prayer"; Transliteration: "Kinenshiki" (Japanese: 祈念式)	May 3, 2022 (Note: This episode aired at 2:37 a.m. JST, 8 minutes after the original air time.)
Ferdinand exasperatedly introduces the unknown priest as Sylvester, and that he has a terrible personality and to humor him. Unfortunately, Sylvester takes the teasing too far and causes her mana to surge, which results in Ferdinand and Karstedt hitting him over the head. The Spring Prayer begins flawlessly and they stay the night at a noble's estate. Sylvester continues to be an entitled pest, and a noble with connections to the High Bishop concerns Ferdinand when he insists on meeting Myne. Luckily, the visit is not long and they stay the night elsewhere. While sleeping, the estate is broken into by bandits, likely with the intent to kidnap Myne, with the prime suspect being the previous insistent noble. A crisis on the road threatens Fran and Rosina's lives and results in a small scale battle.
31	5	"The Gift from the Blue-Robed Priest and Going Home"; Transliteration: "Aoiro Shinkan no Okurimono to Kitaku" (Japanese: 青色神官の贈り物と帰宅)	May 10, 2022 (Note: This episode aired at 2:53 a.m. JST, 24 minutes after the original air time.)
No one who attacked the carriage is from Ehrenfest, but the insistent count's land does border multiple other domains. Ferdinand concludes that Devouring Soldiers must have been involved in the attack, due to the excessive use of mana. Back at the Cathedral, Sylvester tasks Myne with showing him around the orphanage, Myne's Workshop, and the forest the orphans gather supplies in. Ferdinand expresses concern with the printing, but Sylvester states he had a great time and gifts Myne with a charm to protect her; if she is ever in danger, she should press her blood seal onto the stone and Sylvester will come save her. Later, Ferdinand explains that the printing press will put a lot of people out of work and tells Myne to cease printing until she is adopted and has enough powerful backing to keep her safe. Myne is then allowed to return home to her family, and soon after Effa goes into labor.
32	6	"The Abandoned Child of the Cathedral and Making Colors"; Transliteration: "Shinden no Sutego to Irozukuri" (Japanese: 神殿の捨て子と色作り)	May 17, 2022 (Note: This episode aired at 2:38 a.m. JST, 9 minutes after the original air time.)
A meeting between three shady nobles and the High Bishop reveals their plans to get to Myne and that all their attempts during the time of the Spring Prayer failed. A toad-like noble, Count Bindewald from the neighboring domain of Ahrensbach, expresses interest in buying Myne after her kidnapping, delighting the High Bishop who wants her gone. Myne brags about her new little brother, Kamil, to anyone and everyone. After informing Benno that they must pause all printing press productions, she forges ahead with a new idea for colored inks for more picture books. An orphaned infant arrives at the Cathedral and everyone struggles to figure out what to do without a wet nurse. The Ink Guild struggles to find a new guildmaster, but they do meet to discuss the production of colored inks. Myne and Heidi, an inkmaker, bond quickly. Delia continues to try to give information to the High Bishop, and the orphaned baby, now named Dirk, comes down with an illness.
33	7	"Delia and Dirk"; Transliteration: "Deria to Diruku" (Japanese: デリアとディルク)	May 24, 2022 (Note: This episode aired at 2:42 a.m. JST, 13 minutes after the original air time.)
Myne determines quietly that Dirk has the Devouring and informs Ferdinand, who recommends that he form a contract with a noble or he will die. Myne's existence complicates this process, however, as it will draw more attention to her situation, as well. Ferdinand then suggests she form a contract with him once she is adopted by Karstedt. Since they are the only two who know Dirk has the Devouring, they keep it secret so the High Bishop does not find out. Experimentation with ink continues, and Delia bonds with Dirk. When she overhears about Dirk's adoption, she becomes distressed.
34	8	"Ominous Developments"; Transliteration: "Fuon na Ugoki" (Japanese: 不穏な動き)	May 31, 2022 (Note: This episode aired at 2:44 a.m. JST, 15 minutes after the original air time.)
Delia misunderstands the situation with Dirk and blames Ferdinand for separating Myne and her family, and now her and Dirk. Myne confesses it was she who suggested Dirk's adoption, though she keeps the real reason hidden. Myne and Co. finally succeed in making the inks. A mysterious noble from out of town attempts to enter the city, though he was apparently unaware of the new rules and required permits issued by the lord himself, put in place to enter (meant to keep Myne safe), causing a commotion and requiring the deployment of the knights. The failure to enter the city enrages the High Bishop. After spending several days at home to keep her safe and hidden, Myne is able to return to the Cathedral only to discover Dirk and Delia are absent, and Dirk has been adopted by someone approved by the High Bishop. Despite the permission of the lord of Ehrenfest being required for noble adoptions, this does not apply to adoptions by nobles from other domains. Fran urges Myne to fire Delia, and though Delia has clearly been manipulated by the High Bishop, Myne still dismisses her. The noble who attempted to enter the city days prior succeeds in weaseling his way in with a forged permit. Damuel summons the knights when he learns, but Myne and Tulli are both abducted shortly after.
35	9	"The Black Protective Charm"; Transliteration: "Kuroi Omamori" (Japanese: 黒いお守り)	June 7, 2022 (Note: This episode aired at 2:57 a.m. JST, 28 minutes after the original air time.)
Gunther arrives and joins the chase, rescuing Myne, while the kidnappers attempt to hold Tulli at knifepoint. Myne's mana surges in rage, distracting the assailants and allowing Gunther to save Tulli. Myne decides now is the time to place her blood seal on the charm gifted by Sylvester, then she, Gunther, and Damuel rush to the Cathedral to inform Ferdinand. However, he is absent, and Dirk's new father has arrived, who also wants to meet Myne. Dirk was forced to enter a contract of servitude to Count Bindewald rather than a full adoption, and he will remain at the Cathedral until he is older, with the condition that Myne will leave the Cathedral with Bindewald immediately. The High Bishop attempts to force Myne to sign a contract of servitude to Bindewald, as well, resulting in a small battle to protect her. Gunther saves her from placing her blood seal, but is injured in the process, causing her mana to surge again. Ferdinand finally arrives, having apparently been there the whole time, entering a battle of wits with the High Bishop and Bindewald. Just as it looks like Myne and everyone who protected her will have to pay for disobeying and injuring a noble and the High Bishop, Ferdinand learns Myne used the charm Sylvester gave her. He informs her that this means she will be adopted by Sylvester effective immediately. This breaks Gunther's heart, although it is the only way to save everyone present and punish Bindewald and the High Bishop, and Ferdinand engages them.
36	10	"Blessing"; Transliteration: "Shukufuku" (Japanese: 祝福)	June 14, 2022 (Note: This episode aired at 2:35 a.m. JST, 6 minutes after the original air time.)
Karstedt and Sylvester arrive just as Ferdinand defeats Bindewald. The High Bishop is revealed to be Sylvester's uncle, and Sylvester is revealed as the Aub of Ehrenfest, shocking Myne. Bindewald attempts to weasel out of punishment and have Myne punished instead for attacking him when she is merely a commoner--until Sylvester corrects him and helpfully informs him that she's his adoptive daughter. The High Bishop also attempts to avoid responsibility, to no avail. He digs himself a deeper hole when he insults Ferdinand, which angers Sylvester as Ferdinand is his beloved younger half-brother. Sylvester sentences the High Bishop to death, along with his accomplices--including Delia. Myne pleads for leniency for Delia and is allowed to sentence her to stay in the orphanage and take care of Dirk and the children permanently and is never allowed to be an attendant again. Myne's adoption is finalized with Myne's biological family, ending in a tearful goodbye. The commoner Myne is declared dead, and Rozemyne is now the upper class noble daughter of Aub Ehrenfest. Later, Ferdinand orders Rozemyne to introduce printing as a new industry for the benefit of Ehrenfest.

=== Season 4 (2026) ===
No. overall	No. in season	Title	Original release date
37	1	"I've Become a Noble"; Transliteration: "Kizoku ni Natta Watashi" (Japanese: 貴族になったわたし)	April 4, 2026
38	2	"Lower City Family Reunion"; Transliteration: "Shitamachi Kazoku to no Saikai" (Japanese: 下町家族との再会)	April 11, 2026
39	3	"Archduke's Castle and Italian Restaurant"; Transliteration: "Ryoushu no Shiro to Italian Restaurant" (Japanese: 領主の城とイタリアンレストラン)	April 18, 2026
40	4	"How to Collect Donations"; Transliteration: "Kifukin no Atsumekata" (Japanese: 寄付金の集め方)	April 25, 2026
41	5	"Concert Preparations"; Transliteration: "Ensoukai no Junbi" (Japanese: 演奏会の準備)	May 9, 2026
42	6	"Harspiel Concert"; Transliteration: "Feshupiiru Concert" (Japanese: フェシュピールコンサート)	May 16, 2026
43	7	"Hasse's Monastery"; Transliteration: "Hasse no Shoushinden" (Japanese: ハッセの小神殿)	May 23, 2026
44	8	"Ferdinand's Task"; Transliteration: "Ferudinando no Kadai" (Japanese: フェルディナンドの課題)	May 30, 2026
45	9	"Wilfried's Day as High Bishop"; Transliteration: "Virufuriito no Ichinichi Shinden Chou" (Japanese: ヴィルフリートの一日神殿長)	June 6, 2026
46	10	"First Material Gathering"; Transliteration: "Hajimete no Sozai Saishuu" (Japanese: はじめての素材採集)	June 13, 2026
47	11	"The Gathering of Gutenberg"; Transliteration: "Guutenberuku no Tsudoi" (Japanese: グーテンベルクの集い)	June 20, 2026
48	12	"The Winter Social Season and Debut"; Transliteration: "Fuyu no Shakoukai to Ohirome" (Japanese: 冬の社交界とお披露目)	June 27, 2026
49	13	"Winter Material Gathering"; Transliteration: "Fuyu no Sozai Saiahu" (Japanese: 冬の素材採集)	July 11, 2026
50	14	"Hasse's Punishment"; Transliteration: "Hasse no Batou" (Japanese: ハッセへの罰)	July 18, 2026
51	15	"Night of Fruhtrane"; Transliteration: "Fruhtane no Yoru" (Japanese: フリュートレーネの夜)	July 25, 2026
52	16	"New Dress and Printing Press"; Transliteration: "Atarashii Ishô to Insatsuki" (Japanese: 新しい衣装と印刷機)	August 1, 2026
53	17	"Holding the Fort During the Archduke Conference"; Transliteration: "Ryoushu Kaigi no Orusuban" (Japanese: 領主会議のお留守番)	August 8, 2026
54	18	"Dameul's Proposal"; Transliteration: "Dameul no Môshide" (Japanese: ダームエルの申し出)	August 15, 2026
55	19	"Inspection of Illgner and Gathering of Summer"; Transliteration: "Irukunā Shisatsu to Natsu no Saishū" (Japanese: イルクナー視察と夏の採集)	August 22, 2026
56	20	"Georgine's Visit"; Transliteration: "Georugīne no Raihō" (Japanese: ゲオルギーネの来訪)	September 5, 2026
57	21	"Ruelle Rechallenge"; Transliteration: "Ryueru ni sai chōsen" (Japanese: リュエルに再挑戦)	September 12, 2026
58	22	"Wilfried's Actions"; Transliteration: "Virufurito no okonai" (Japanese: ヴィルフリートの行い)	September 19, 2026
59	23	"Charlotte's Baptism"; Transliteration: "Sharurotte no senrei-shiki" (Japanese: シャルロッテの洗礼式)	September 26, 2026
60	24	"Rescue"; Transliteration: "Kyūshutsu" (Japanese: 救出)	October 3, 2026
