= Sagrada Reset =

Japanese light novel series and its franchise

- First-print cover of the first light novel

サクラダリセット (Sakurada Risetto)
- Genre: Fantasy, science fiction
- Light novel
- Written by: Yutaka Kōno
- Illustrated by: You Shiina
- Published by: Kadokawa Shoten
- English publisher: NA: Seven Seas Entertainment
- Imprint: Kadokawa Sneaker Bunko
- Magazine: The Sneaker
- Original run: 30 May 2009 – 31 March 2012
- Volumes: 7
- Manga
- Written by: Masahiko Yoshihara
- Published by: Kadokawa Shoten
- Magazine: Monthly Shōnen Ace
- Original run: December 2010 – November 2011
- Volumes: 2
- Anime television series
- Directed by: Shinya Kawatsura
- Produced by: Hiroyuki Aoi; Takashi Tachizaki; Hirotsugu Ogisu
- Written by: Katsuhiko Takayama
- Music by: Rayons
- Studio: David Production
- Licensed by: AUS: Madman Entertainment; NA: Sentai Filmworks; UK: MVM Films
- Original network: Tokyo MX, Kansai TV, BS11, AT-X
- Original run: 5 April 2017 – 13 September 2017
- Episodes: 24
- Live-action film
- Directed by: Yoshihiro Fukagawa
- Produced by: Kei Haruna
- Released: 25 March 2017
- Live-action film
- Directed by: Yoshihiro Fukagawa
- Produced by: Kei Haruna
- Released: 13 May 2017
- Manga
- Illustrated by: Tatsu Nohana
- Published by: Enterbrain
- Magazine: Famitsu Comic Clear
- Original run: 2017 – present

Sagrada Reset (Japanese: サクラダリセット, Hepburn: Sakurada Risetto), also known as Sakurada Reset, is a Japanese light novel series written by Yutaka Kōno and illustrated by You Shiina. The series was published by Kadokawa Shoten between 2009 and 2012. A manga adaptation was published in Monthly Shōnen Ace in 2010. A 24-episode anime television series produced by David Production aired from 5 April to 13 September 2017. The anime is licensed by Sentai Filmworks in North America. The two-part live-action film premiered on 25 March 2017 and 13 May 2017.

== Plot ==
The story is set in Sakurada (咲良田), a town where everyone possesses special abilities. The protagonist is Kei Asai, a boy with eidetic memory. Upon Sumire Soma's urging, Kei meets Misora Haruki, a quiet, withdrawn girl who can reset the world to up to three days in the past. Thanks to his ability, Kei can remember the time Misora has reset, and thus Sumire suggests that Kei becomes the companion of Haruki to help her use her abilities for good leading to them becoming part of the Service Club—a club that accomplishes tasks given to them. The Service Club then becomes involved with the Administration Bureau, an organization that monitors all special abilities in Sakurada and orchestrates events in Sakurada according to their directives, utilizing the 'Witch' at their disposal. Unknown to the Service Club, their involvement with the Bureau puts them into a larger chain of events that only the Witch knows.

== Characters ==
Kei Asai (浅井 ケイ, Asai Kei)
Voiced by: Kaito Ishikawa
Portrayed by: Shūhei Nomura
One of the main characters. His ability is photographic memory; ever since entering Sakurada, he cannot forget anything down to the minute details, even if Haruki uses her Reset ability. He's a cunning character that can understand situations quickly and take full advantage of everything at his disposal to resolve the situation at hand.
Misora Haruki (春埼 美空, Haruki Misora)
Voiced by: Kana Hanazawa
Portrayed by: Yuina Kuroshima
One of the main characters. She possesses the ability to 'reset' the town of Sakurada for a maximum of three days. To do this, she must first 'save' at a specific time, after which, when she uses her Reset, the town of Sakurada will return to the saved time. A Reset can be done once per Save, and after a Reset, a Save can only be done 24 hours later. Her ability is not going back in time, but a literal reset; everything is reverted to its original state when the save was made. As a result, her own memories of the time between a Save and a Reset are also gone. This made her ability useless because she herself would have no idea what she wanted to change before committing a Reset, and everything will just repeat what happened before. The only person who can remember the events before the Reset is Kei.
Sumire Sōma (相麻 菫, Sōma Sumire)
Voiced by: Aoi Yūki
Portrayed by: Yuna Taira
A female classmate who was a victim during a Reset. Her ability is precognition based on a person's memories and emotions - she can 'see' an individual's future up to an unspecified point of time, and requires a conversation with a subject to function. The ability is strong enough that she starts to lose her sense of self after she discovers her ability. The future that she sees is not absolute either as they can change depending on external influences on the individual. Her suicide early in the series becomes the trigger that sets into motion the events of the series.
Tomoki Nakano (中野 智樹, Nakano Tomoki)
Voiced by: Takuya Eguchi
Portrayed by: Kentaro
A rock and roll singer who plays guitar and Kei's close friend. His ability is to send a voice he heard to a specific person, unbound by time and space and arriving exactly at the date and time intended. This ability transcends a Reset phenomena so even if a Reset is performed, the message would still be sent to the recipient at the specified time and date.
Yōka Murase (村瀬 陽香, Murase Yōka)
Voiced by: Yui Makino
Portrayed by: Tina Tamashiro
A young woman with the ability to apply an 'erase' capability to anything. The requirement is she must first state the target of the ability, the object/phenomena to be 'erased', and make physical contact with the target. For example, stating the target to be her hands and the object to be erased as a wall would apply the ability to her hands and enable her to erase a part of a wall with it. Her brother was a member of the Administration Bureau and is now deceased due to unmentioned circumstances, leading Yoka to swear revenge on the Administration Bureau for being involved in the events regarding her brother's death.
Eri Oka (岡 絵里, Oka Eri)
Voiced by: Yūka Aisaka
Portrayed by: Yuri Tsunematsu
Kei and Misora's junior in their high school. Her ability is memory manipulation via eye contact; if she maintains eye contact with a person for 5 seconds, she can change the person's memories - inserting or deleting memories that she wants, thus making her able to 'seal' other people's abilities as she can make them forget how to use their abilities. Originally, she was known as Eri Fujikawa, but after meeting Kei, who helped her escape from her abusive father, she took her mother's maiden name. She changed herself after the event, proclaiming that she wants to be more powerful and capable than Kei leading to her being hostile against Kei, but not truly hating him. Her name is read the same as "okaeri" - a Japanese phrase meaning "Welcome home".
Seika Nono (野ノ尾 盛夏, Nono Seika)
Voiced by: Sachika Misawa
A girl with the ability to access the senses of any cat in Sakurada whenever she is asleep. As long as the cat is awake, then she can access its senses and access the cat's memories.
Masamune Urachi (浦地 正宗, Urachi Masamune)
Voiced by: Takahiro Sakurai
Played by: Mitsuhiro Oikawa
The Sakurada City Administration Bureau task force's leader. His ability is to 'reset' a particular person or object to an earlier 'version' of them (up to maximum of 2 years). His ability is similar to Haruki's Reset although it only affects objects he can make physical contact with.
Sasane Ukawa (宇川 沙々音, Ukawa Sasane)
Played by: Rei Okamoto
An Administration Bureau member with the power to manipulate the properties of objects. Her power requires her to wear special rings in her fingers that would determine what kind of effects she wants to impose on an object. Her ability is seemingly unlimited in its capabilities however exactly 1 minute is needed before she can activate her ability again after the end of its first usage.
Yōsuke Sakagami (坂上 央介, Sakagami Yōsuke)
Voiced by: Yūichi Iguchi
Played by: Kenshiro Iwai
Kei's upperclassman with the power to copy abilities, however he needs to be in proximity with the target to use his ability. Furthermore, his Copy ability can be used to transfer someone's abilities to another person with him acting as the 'bridge' between the 2 people. For example, he can initiate a Copy on Kei and 'transfer' it to Haruki while he's in proximity with both of them. However, the copied abilities would be gone as soon as he's out of proximity of his targets.
Mirai Minami (皆実 未来, Minami Mirai)
Voiced by: Yuki Yamada
Played by: Yuuka Yano
Kei and Haruki's classmate who survived an accident thanks to a Reset. She's interested in supernatural phenomena, thus she became happy when she found out that her ability is to turn into a "Ghost" for a period of time although the rules regarding her ability are undefined.
Shintarō Tsushima (津島 信太郎, Tsushima Shintarō)
Voiced by: Yōji Ueda
Played by: Hisashi Yoshizawa
An Administration Bureau member and a school teacher at Ashiharabashi High School, which both Kei, Haruki and their friends attend. He serves as the middle man between the Bureau and the Service Club, giving out tasks by the Bureau to the Service Club and only providing some hints to Kei to help solve the tasks.
Kagaya (加賀屋, Kagaya)
Voiced by: Shigeo Kiyama
Played by: Tomomi Maruyama
An Administration Bureau member whose ability is to perform a 'time lock' on any physical object that his right hand touches and only his left hand can undo the 'time lock'. The 'time lock' enables the physical object he touched to be rendered immune to all physical phenomena thus they're also unaffected by the effects of time itself and is even unaffected by Haruki's 'Reset' ability. His ability is used by the Bureau to confine people or lock objects of interest.
Sakuin (索引, Sakuin)
Played by: Arisa Nakajima
Another member of the Administration Bureau. Her ability allows her to detect any lie from a person's spoken words and works similarly to a synesthesia as she can see 'colors' from a person's speech which allows her to determine if they're telling the truth or not.
Hitsūchikun (非通知くん, Hitsūchikun)
Voiced by: Kōtarō Nishiyama
A weak, sickly boy who has mysophobia, so he can't eat any food. Although to compensate for his disease, his ability allows him to convert 'information' into nutrient which allows him to survive. He can accidentally kill people if his ability drains a target's information beyond their limit. To keep this ability in check, the Administration Bureau arranged for him a set up so he can work as informant, and collect information in way that is safer for other human. When called, he will fake a destination number not found announcement and have to be called continuously until he finally answer. Hitsuuchi is his nickname, referring to the message when phone call failed to connect (such as destination number not found).
Hiroyuki Sasano (佐々野 宏幸, Sasano Hiroyuki)
Voiced by: Hiroshi Naka
Played by: Goro Oishi
A citizen of Sakurada who has the ability to create 'scenarios' in the picture that he takes using a specific camera model; the pictures taken by him are imbued with his ability, thus allowing anyone to go into the 'scenario' inside a picture and relieve it once they tear down the picture. However, the 'scenario' inside the picture only lasts for 10 minutes. It is unknown whether his ability can alter the future if a person decides to make a drastic change while in a 'scenario' or if the effects of events in a 'scenario' can affect the current world. He was involved with the Bureau's early years and was in a relationship with the Witch when they were younger.
Yoko Asai (浅井 よこ, Asai Yoko)
Played by: Akiko Yagi
Kei's mother. She does not live in Sakurada, and is unaware that Kei lives there now. Kei later meets her again outside of Sakurada and finds out that she gave birth to his sister named Megumi.
Witch (魔女, Majō)
Voiced by: Sayaka Ohara
Played by: Mariko Kaga
An elderly woman who has the ability to see the future. The Bureau keeps her confined for their use and thus she is treated as a 'tool'. She doesn't tell Kei her name and instead tells him to call her a 'Witch' instead. She and Sasano were in a relationship but separated once the Bureau found out about her ability. It is hinted that she's the one that orchestrated the events of the series due to her influence on Kei when he was younger. Her ability is simulation rather than precognition allowing her to perform very accurate simulations of events that will happen in Sakurada. Misora's Reset ability can't affect it simply because Reset itself is already a factor in any simulated events. However, the simulations she performs are not certain and can be influenced by certain unknown factors that she does not foresee. It is hinted that Sumire's precognition ability can affect her simulations.
Sawako Sera (世良 佐和子, Sera Sawako)
Voiced by: Rikako Aida
Michiru (ミチル, Michiru)
Voiced by: Maaya Uchida
A girl with ability to pull other people into her dream as long as they sleep nearby her. She created an alternate persona named Chiruchiru in her dream world which grants her wishes thus making her ability as omnipotence in a dream world. Chiruchiru and Michiru is the Japanese name of Tytyl and Mytyl, the siblings in The Blue Bird.

== Media ==
=== Light novels ===
Yutaka Kōno published the novels, with illustrations by You Shiina, in Kadokawa Shoten's The Sneaker magazine. The first volume was then published under Kadokawa Shoten's Kadokawa Sneaker Bunko imprint in 2009. The series ran until 2012, during which time it was collected into seven volumes. Kōno also wrote six short stories for the series, four of which were collected in the fourth novel, while the other two were published on Kadokawa's The Sneaker website. A reprint of the novels was announced at the same time as the anime and live-action films. The first reprinted volume was released in September 2016, and further volumes were reprinted on a monthly schedule. A new novel adaptation is also due to accompany the anime and films.

In October 2026, Seven Seas Entertainment announced that they had licensed the series for English publication, with the first volume set to release in March 2027.

No.	Title	Release date	ISBN
1	Cat, Ghost and Revolution Sunday; Neko to Yūrei to Nichiyōbi no Kakumei (猫と幽霊と日曜日の革命)	30 May 2009; 24 September 2016 (reprint)	978-4-04-474301-7; ISBN 978-4-04-104188-8
2	Witch, Picture and Red Eye Girl	27 February 2010	978-4-04-474302-4
3	Memory in Children	31 August 2010	978-4-04-474303-1
4	Goodbye is Not Easy Word to Say	30 November 2010	978-4-04-474304-8
5	One Hand Eden	28 April 2011	978-4-04-474305-5
6	Boy, Girl and ——	30 November 2011	978-4-04-474306-2
7	Boy, Girl and the Story of Sagrada	31 March 2012	978-4-04-100209-4

=== Manga ===
Masahiko Yoshihara began serializing a manga adaptation in the February 2011 issue of Kadokawa's shōnen manga magazine Monthly Shōnen Ace in December 2010. The series was compiled into two volumes, both published on 22 November 2011 (ISBN 978-4-04-120011-7 and ISBN 978-4-04-120012-4). A second manga was released to accompany the anime and film project in 2017.

=== Anime ===
A 24-episode anime television series adaptation aired from 5 April to 13 September 2017. The series is produced by David Production and directed by Shinya Kawatsura, with scripts written by Katsuhiko Takayama and character designs by Tomoyuki Shitaya. The opening theme is "Reset" sung by Yui Makino, and the ending theme is "Tonariau" (トナリアウ) by The Oral Cigarettes. The second opening theme is "Dakara Boku wa Boku o Tebanasu" (だから僕は僕を手放す) by Weaver, and the second ending theme is "Colors of Happiness" by Yui Makino. Sentai Filmworks has licensed the series in North America and will release the anime on home video. The series was initially streamed exclusively on Anime Strike, Amazon's on-demand anime subscription service, but would reappear on Hidive in 2026. MVM Films will release the series in the United Kingdom.

==== Episode list ====
No.	Title	Original release date
1	"Memory in Children 1/3"	5 April 2017
2	"Memory in Children 2/3"	12 April 2017
3	"Cat, Ghost and Revolution Sunday 1/2"	19 April 2017
4	"Cat, Ghost and Revolution Sunday 2/2"	26 April 2017
5	"Marble World and Candy Resist" "Bīdama Sekai to Kyandī Rejisuto" (ビー玉世界とキャンディーレジスト)	3 May 2017
6	"Witch, Picture and Red Eye Girl 1/3"	10 May 2017
7	"Witch, Picture and Red Eye Girl 2/3"	17 May 2017
8	"Witch, Picture and Red Eye Girl 3/3"	24 May 2017
9	"Strapping/Goodbye is not an easy word to say"	31 May 2017
10	"Memory in Children 3/3"	7 June 2017
11	"A Certain Day's Haruki-san" "Aru Hi no Haruki-san" (ある日の春埼さん)	14 June 2017
12	"One Hand Eden 1/4"	21 June 2017
13	"One Hand Eden 2/4"	28 June 2017
14	"One Hand Eden 3/4"	5 July 2017
15	"One Hand Eden 4/4"	12 July 2017
16	"Boy, Girl and — 1/4"	19 July 2017
17	"Boy, Girl and — 2/4"	26 July 2017
18	"Boy, Girl and — 3/4"	2 August 2017
19	"Boy, Girl and — 4/4"	9 August 2017
20	"Boy, Girl and the Story of Sagrada 1/5"	16 August 2017
21	"Boy, Girl and the Story of Sagrada 2/5"	23 August 2017
22	"Boy, Girl and the Story of Sagrada 3/5"	30 August 2017
23	"Boy, Girl and the Story of Sagrada 4/5"	6 September 2017
24	"Boy, Girl and the Story of Sagrada 5/5"	13 September 2017

=== Live-action films ===
A pair of live-action films were announced in September 2016. The films are directed by Yoshihiro Fukagawa and produced by Kei Haruna. Filming began on 17 September 2016, and lasted for two months. The films were screened in approximately 200 theaters. The first film premiered on 25 March 2017, while the second film premiered on 13 May 2017. The theme song for the first film is "Last Call" by flumpool.
