= You Shiina =

Japanese illustrator and manga artist

- 椎名優
- Notable work: Ascendance of a Bookworm; Shizen Chūritsushi
- Website: YouShiina Works

You Shiina (椎名 優, Shiina Yū) is a Japanese freelance illustrator and manga artist. She has contributed to light novel and children's book covers, illustrations, as well as game package and character design. She did work on the illustrations for the Ascendance of a Bookworm series by Miya Kazuki.

She received the Dengeki Game Illustration Gold Award in 1998, and her cover art for the "Ascendance of a Bookworm" earned the Kono Light Novel ga Sugoi! award in 2018 and 2019.

== Biography ==
In high school, she began submitting work to contests. Shiina found employment at a game company and undertook the character designs for Purikura Daisakusen in 1996.

She contributed character designs for Tales of Commons (2005), Tales of Wahrheit (2006), and Tales of the World: Material Dungeon (2008) in the Tales of Mobile series of mobile phone games from Bandai Namco Games. In 2008, Shiina collaborated with fellow artist Haccan on illustrations and package design for The Legend of Heroes: Trails in the Sky from Nihon Falcom.

In 2013, her artwork on the Sagrada Reset light novel series placed ninth in the annual Kono Light Novel ga Sugoi! awards from publisher Takarajimasha. Her cover art and illustration work on the Ascendance of a Bookworm light novel series have ranked in the top ten in Kono Light Novel ga Sugoi! every year since 2017 and won in 2018 and 2019. She was named the ninth most popular light novel illustrator in both 2021 and 2022.

== Bibliography ==
=== Manga ===
Shiina wrote and illustrated Monochrome Myst, a three-volume manga series published through the Dengeki Comics imprint of Kadokawa Shoten.

- Volume 1 (July 2011, ISBN 9784048707220)
- Volume 2 (January 2013, ISBN 9784048913485)
- Volume 3 (March 2014, ISBN 9784048663908)

They wrote and illustrated a manga based on The Diary of Anne Frank:

- Anne Furanku: Nikki de Heiwa o Negatta Shoujo (アンネ・フランク 日記で平和を願った少女) (January 2018, Kadokawa Shoten, ISBN 978-4041039755)

=== Art books ===
Shiina's art has been collected in several volumes:

- Shiina Yū Gashū: Tenkyū Kitan (椎名優画集 天球綺譚) (March 2002, ASCII Media Works, ISBN 4840220468)
- Shiina Yū Gashū II: Gentō Teien (椎名優画集II 幻燈庭園) (December 2002, ASCII Media Works, ISBN 4840221774)
- Shiina Yū Gashū: Enjeru Hauringu: Shōka no Koe (椎名優画集 エンジェル・ハウリング 硝化の声) (October 2004, Fujimi Shobo, ISBN 4829191309)
- Edel Farben (winter 2008, Tenkyudho, no ISBN, produced for Comicket)
- Shiina Yū Gashū III: Gānetto (椎名優画集III ガーネット) (March 2012, ASCII Media Works, ISBN 978-4-04-886316-2)

== Cover and interior illustrations ==
Shiina created the cover and/or interior illustrations for the following works:

- Tsuki to Anata ni Hanataba o (月と貴女に花束を) by Kazuya Shimura (8 volumes, June 1996 - April 2003, Dengeki Bunko)
- Neko no Chikyuugi (猫の地球儀) by Mizuhito Akiyama (2 volumes, January - April 2000, Dengeki Bunko)
- Angel Howling (エンジェル・ハウリング, Enjeru Hauringu) by Yoshinobu Akita (10 volumes, October 2000 - October 2004, Fujimi Fantasia Bunko)
- Nazuna Hime-sama SOS (なずな姫様SOS) by Taro Achi (2 volumes, September 2001 - April 2002, Dengeki Bunko)
- Kirin wa Ichizu ni Koi o Suru (麒麟は一途に恋をする) by Kazuya Shimura (7 volumes, February 2004 - December 2006, Dengeki Bunko)
- Kōga no Ruby Wolf (紅牙のルビーウルフ, Kōga no Rubī Urufu) by Homare Awamichi (8 volumes, September 2005 - April 2008, Fujimi Fantasia Bunko)
- Dark Elf no Kuchizuke (ダークエルフの口づけ, Dāku Erufu no Kuchizuke) by Tadaaki Kawato (4 volumes, August 2006 - December 2007, Fujimi Fantasia Bunko)
- Euphori Technica (ユーフォリ・テクニカ ～王立技術院物語～, Yūfori Tekunika: Ōritsu Gijutsuin Monogatari) by Shinji Sadakane (December 2006, Chuokoron-Shinsha, ISBN 412500966X)
- Megaro Ōfan (メガロ・オーファン) by Mio Wakagi (2 volumes, January 2007 - November 2008, Kadokawa Beans Bunko)
- Morpheus no Kyōshitsu (モーフィアスの教室, Mōfiasu no Kyōshitsu) by En Mikami (4 volumes, January - November 2008, Dengeki Bunko)
- Sagrada Reset by Yutaka Kōno (7 volumes, May 2009 - March 2012, Sneaker Bunko)
- Itsuwari no Dragoon (偽りのドラグーン, Itsuwari no Doragūn) by En Mikami (5 volumes, August 2009 - July 2011, Dengeki Bunko)
- Baby, Good Morning (ベイビー、グッドモーニング, Beibī, Guddo Mōningu) by Yutaka Kōno (March 2012, Sneaker Bunko, ISBN 9784041002148)
- Ajisai no Kisetsu ni Bokura wa Kannō Suru (あじさいの季節に僕らは感応する) by Fumihiko Shimo (July 2014, Famitsu Bunko, ISBN 9784047297821)
- Sheikusupia no Taimageki (シェイクスピアの退魔劇) by Yōichi Haruna (August 2014, Fujimi L Bunko, ISBN 978-4040703022)
- Ascendance of a Bookworm by Miya Kazuki (33 volumes, January 2015 - current, To Books)
- Otoko nara Ikkoku Ichijō no Aruji o Mezasanakya ne (男なら一国一城の主を目指さなきゃね) by Sandogasa (4 volumes, January - December 2015, Fujimi Shobo)
- Suraimu na Danjon kara Tenka o Torō to Omō. (スライムなダンジョンから天下をとろうと思う。) by Saitō (4 volumes, March 2015 - February 2016, Earth Star Novel)
- Jisatsusuru ni wa Mukanai Kisetsu (自殺するには向かない季節) by Ryūto Ebina (May 2017, Kodansha, ISBN 9784063815962)
- Theme of the Water & Biscuit (ウォーター&ビスケットのテーマ, Uōtā to Bisuketto no Tēma) by Yutaka Kōno (2 volumes, September 2017 - April 2018, Kodansha Ranobe Bunko)
- Itsuka no Kurisumasu no Hi, Kimi wa Toki no Hate ni Kiete (いつかのクリスマスの日、きみは時の果てに消えて) by Tsukasa Seo (November 2017, Famitsu Bunko, ISBN 9784047348899)
- I Aim for the Maximum of the Production Skills (異世界転生して生産スキルのカンスト目指します!, Isekai Tenseishite Seisan Sukiru no Kansuto Mezashimasu) by Ryūto Watari (4 volumes, March 2019 - December 2020, Dragon Novels)

=== Children's books ===
Shiina illustrated the following children's books:

- Uru wa Sorairo Majo (ウルは空色魔女) by Masumi Asano (3 volumes, February 2009 - December 2010, Kadokawa Shoten)
- The Secret Garden by Chihiro Kurihara (based on the Burnett novel) (October 2012, Tsubasa Bunko, ISBN 9784046312679)
- Sutajio kara 5-byō Mae! Hoshigaoka Kohōsōbu, Rajio Debyū! (スタジオから5秒前! 星ヶ丘小放送部、ラジオデビュー!) by Rieko Tazawa (May 2013, Kadokawa Shoten, ISBN 9784046313089)
- A Little Princess, translated by Nanae Sugita (July 2013, Tsubasa Bunko, ISBN 978-4046313263)
- Crayon Kingdom Best Collection by Reizō Fukunaga (Aoitori Bunko)
  - Kureyon Ōkoku no Jūnikagetsu (クレヨン王国の十二か月) (November 2011, ISBN 978-4062852555)
  - Kureyon Ōkoku no Hana Usagi (クレヨン王国の花ウサギ) (July 2012, ISBN 978-4062852968)
  - Shin Jūnikagetsu no Tabi (新十二か月の旅) (December 2013, ISBN 978-4062853897)
  - Ichigo-mura (いちご村) (December 2014, ISBN 978-4062854641)
  - Chō Tokkyū 24-iro Yume Ressha (超特急24色ゆめ列車) (June 2015, ISBN 978-4062854993)
  - Kuro no Ginkō (黒の銀行) (May 2016, ISBN 978-4062855556)
- Little House on the Prairie series by Laura Ingalls Wilder, translated by Nagiko Nakamura (Tsubasa Bunko):
  - Little House in the Big Woods (大きな森の小さな家, Ōki na Mori no Chīsa na Ie) (January 2012, ISBN 978-4046311870)
  - Little House on the Prairie (大草原の小さな家, Daisōgen no Chiisa na Ie) (July 2012, ISBN 978-4046312280)
  - On the Banks of Plum Creek (プラム・クリークの土手で, Puramu Kurīku no Dote de) (June 2014, ISBN 978-4046317919)
- Little Lord Fauntelroy, translated by Nanae Sugita (September 2014, Tsubasa Bunko, ISBN 978-4046314314)
- The Gift of the Magi / The Last Leaf, translated by various (December 2014, Tsubasa Bunko, ISBN 978-4046314550)
- Puri Dori: Unmei no Tobira! (プリ・ドリ 運命のトビラ!) (February 2016, Aoitori Bunko, ISBN 978-4062855402)
- Puri Dori: Umi no Ue no Uta-hime (プリ・ドリ 海の上の歌姫) (September 2016, Aoitori Bunko, ISBN 978-4062855761)
- Samurai Hustle (novelization) by Yui Tokiumi (September 2016, Aoitori Bunko, ISBN 978-4062855822)
- Sengoku no Kijōshu: Inoi Naotora (戦国の姫城主 井伊直虎) (November 2016, Tsubasa Bunko, ISBN 978-4046316615)
- The Story of Helen Keller (ヘレン・ケラー物語, Heren Kerā Monogatari) by Taeko Higashi (June 2017, Aoitori Bunko, ISBN 978-4062856393)
- Nihon no Kami-sama: Kojiki no Monogatari (日本の神さま 古事記の物語) by Yui Tokiumi (October 2017, Aoitori Bunko, ISBN 978-4062856591)

== Reception ==
=== Awards and recognition ===
Shiina has been nominated for and won multiple awards.

Year	Organization	Award title, Category	Work	Result	Ref.
1998	ASCII Media Works	Dengeki Game Illustration Award, Gold Award	Shizen Chūritsushi (自然調律師)	Won	
2013	Takarajimasha	Kono Light Novel ga Sugoi!	Sagrada Reset	9	
2017	Takarajimasha	Kono Light Novel ga Sugoi!, Tankōbon	Ascendance of a Bookworm cover art	5	
2018	Takarajimasha	Kono Light Novel ga Sugoi!, Tankōbon	Ascendance of a Bookworm cover art	Won	
2019	Takarajimasha	Kono Light Novel ga Sugoi!, Tankōbon	Ascendance of a Bookworm cover art	Won	
2019	Takarajimasha	Kono Light Novel ga Sugoi!, Top Light Novel of the Decade	Ascendance of a Bookworm	7	
2020	Takarajimasha	Kono Light Novel ga Sugoi!, Tankōbon	Ascendance of a Bookworm cover art	2	
2021	Takarajimasha	Kono Light Novel ga Sugoi!, Tankōbon	Ascendance of a Bookworm cover art	2	
2021	Takarajimasha	Kono Light Novel ga Sugoi!, Top Illustrator	Ascendance of a Bookworm	9	
2022	Takarajimasha	Kono Light Novel ga Sugoi!, Tankōbon	Ascendance of a Bookworm cover art	3	
2022	Takarajimasha	Kono Light Novel ga Sugoi!, Top Illustrator	Ascendance of a Bookworm	9	
