= Miya Kazuki =

Japanese novelist and essayist

- 香月美夜
- Born: Japan
- Occupation: Novelist
- Writing career
- Period: 2015–present
- Genre: Light novel
- Notable work: Ascendance of a Bookworm

Miya Kazuki (香月美夜, Kazuki Miya) is a Japanese light novelist and essayist.

== Career ==
Kazuki started writing novels when she was in her second year of junior high school. After taking an entrance exam, she entered into a national university before graduating and becoming busy with work, stopping her from writing. Once she was married and her child entered kindergarten, Kazuki had more free time, which she used to start writing again. From 2013 onwards, she started publishing her novel Ascendance of a Bookworm on the user-generated novel publishing website Shōsetsuka ni Narō which saw success. In 2015, she officially debuted with said series under the T.O. Books imprint.

From 2015 to 2017, Kazuki founded a research group and wrote for the magazine Minna no Toshokan (みんなの図書館) where she published her essays about issues surrounding libraries.

== Bibliography ==
=== Novels ===
- Ascendance of a Bookworm (本好きの下剋上 〜司書になるためには手段を選んでいられません〜) (Illustrated by You Shiina, published by T.O. Books, 33 volumes, 2015–2023)
