= Ascendance of a Bookworm =

Japanese light novel series and its adaptations

- First light novel volume cover, featuring Myne

本好きの下剋上 ～司書になるためには手段を選んでいられません～ (Honzuki no Gekokujō: Shisho ni Naru Tame ni wa Shudan o Erandeiraremasen)
- Genre: Isekai
- Novel series
- Written by: Miya Kazuki
- Published by: Shōsetsuka ni Narō
- Original run: September 23, 2013 – March 12, 2017
- Light novel
- Written by: Miya Kazuki
- Illustrated by: You Shiina
- Published by: TO Books
- English publisher: NA: J-Novel Club
- Imprint: TO Bunko
- Original run: January 25, 2015 – December 9, 2023
- Volumes: 33
- Novel series

Hannelore's Fifth Year at the Royal Academy
- Written by: Miya Kazuki
- Published by: Shōsetsuka ni Narō
- Original run: April 28, 2017 – present
- Light novel

Short Story Collection
- Written by: Miya Kazuki
- Illustrated by: You Shiina
- Published by: TO Books
- English publisher: NA: J-Novel Club
- Imprint: TO Bunko
- Original run: October 10, 2019 – present
- Volumes: 3
- Light novel

Hannelore's Fifth Year at the Royal Academy
- Written by: Miya Kazuki
- Illustrated by: You Shiina
- Published by: TO Books
- English publisher: NA: J-Novel Club
- Imprint: TO Bunko
- Original run: August 10, 2024 – present
- Volumes: 3
- Manga

Part 1; Part 2; Part 3; Part 4; Part 5
- Written by: Miya Kazuki
- Illustrated by: Suzuka (P1–2, 5); Ryo Namino (P3); Hikaru Katsuki (P4)
- Published by: TO Books
- English publisher: NA: J-Novel Club
- Imprint: Corona Comics
- Magazine: Comic Corona
- Original run: October 30, 2015 (P1); September 24, 2018 (P2); April 30, 2018 (P3); December 24, 2020 (P4); August 10, 2024 (P5); –: July 2, 2018 (P1); August 25, 2025 (P2); present (P3–5)
- Volumes: 7 (P1); 13 (P2); 10 (P3); 12 (P4); 1 (P5)
- Anime television series

Ascendance of a Bookworm (S1–3); Ascendance of a Bookworm: Adopted Daughter of an Archduke (S4); Ascendance of a Bookworm: Founder of the Royal Academy's So-Called Library Committee (S5)
- Directed by: Mitsuru Hongo (S1–3); Yoshiaki Iwasaki (S4)
- Written by: Mariko Kunisawa
- Music by: Michiru
- Studio: Ajiado (S1–3); Wit Studio (S4–5)
- Licensed by: Crunchyroll (streaming); NA: Sentai Filmworks (home video; S1–2 only); SA/SEA: Muse Communication
- Original network: Tokyo MX; ABC TV (S1–2); Wowow, BS Fuji, AT-X (S1–3); ytv (S3); NNS (ytv, Nippon TV) (S4)
- Original run: October 3, 2019 – present
- Episodes: 60 + 2 OVAs
- icon

Ascendance of a Bookworm (Japanese: 本好きの下剋上 ～司書になるためには手段を選んでいられません～, Hepburn: Honzuki no Gekokujō: Shisho ni Naru Tame ni wa Shudan o Erandeiraremasen; lit. 'Ascendance of a Bookworm: I'll Stop at Nothing to Become a Librarian'), also known as AoaB or Honzuki (本好き) for short, is a Japanese light novel series written by Miya Kazuki and illustrated by You Shiina. It was serialized online from September 2013 to March 2017 on the user-generated novel publishing website Shōsetsuka ni Narō. It was later acquired by TO Books, who published it in thirty-three volumes from January 2015 to December 2023.

A manga adaptation of the first part with art by Suzuka was serialized online via the Niconico Seiga website from October 2015 to July 2018. It was collected in seven tankōbon volumes by TO Books. Both the light novel and manga are published in English by J-Novel Club. An anime television series adaptation produced by Ajiado aired the first season from October to December 2019, and the second season aired from April to June 2020. A two-part OVA episode was released in March 2020. A third season aired from April to June 2022. A fourth season produced by Wit Studio aired from April to September 2026. A fifth season has been announced.

== Plot ==
The story follows Urano Motosu, a book-loving post-secondary college student and soon-to-be librarian who ends up crushed to death beneath a pile of books at her house during an earthquake. With her dying breath, she wishes to be reincarnated in a world where she can read books. Urano awakens in the body of a five-year-old girl named Myne in a world where books are scarce and only available to elites. Myne, retaining her memories from her previous life, decides to create and print her own books so that she can read again.

== Media ==
=== Light novels ===
Ascendance of a Bookworm was originally published by Miya Kazuki as a free-to-read web novel on Shōsetsuka ni Narō from 2013 to 2017. It was acquired by TO Books which published the first volume in print in their TO Bunko imprint with illustrations by You Shiina in January 2015. The thirty-third and last volume was published in December 2023. The series is divided into five parts. The light novel is published in English by J-Novel Club, who released the series between May 2019 and September 2024.

The series continued with a sequel titled Ascendance of a Bookworm: Hannelore's Fifth Year at the Royal Academy, following the perspective of Rozemyne's close friend Hannelore in her next year at the Royal Academy, after the events of the main series. As with the main series, the Hannelore sequel was originally published by Miya Kazuki as web novel.

==== Volume list ====
No.	Title	Original release date	English release date
1	Part 1: Daughter of a Soldier Vol.1; Dai Ichi-bu: Heishi no Musume 1 (第一部 兵士の娘I)	January 25, 2015; 978-4-86472-342-8	May 20, 2019 (Digital); September 3, 2019 (Physical); 978-1-7183-5600-9
2	Part 1: Daughter of a Soldier Vol. 2 Dai Ichi-bu: Heishi no Musume 2 (第一部 兵士の娘II)	February 25, 2015; 978-4-86472-347-3	July 09, 2019 (Digital); November 5, 2019 (Physical); 978-1-7183-5601-6
3	Part 1: Daughter of a Soldier Vol. 3 Dai Ichi-bu: Heishi no Musume 3 (第一部 兵士の娘III)	June 25, 2015; 978-4-86472-397-8	September 03, 2019 (Digital); January 7, 2020 (Physical); 978-1-7183-5602-3
4	Part 2: Apprentice Shrine Maiden Vol. 1 Dai Ni-bu: Shinden no Miko Minarai 1 (第二部 神殿の巫女見習いI)	September 25, 2015; 978-4-86472-424-1	November 10, 2019 (Digital); April 7, 2020 (Physical); 978-1-7183-5603-0
5	Part 2: Apprentice Shrine Maiden Vol.2; Dai Ni-bu: Shinden no Miko Minarai 2 (第二部 神殿の巫女見習いII)	December 25, 2015; 978-4-86472-447-0	January 20, 2020 (Digital); June 2, 2020 (Physical); 978-1-7183-5604-7
6	Part 2: Apprentice Shrine Maiden Vol. 3 Dai Ni-bu: Shinden no Miko Minarai 3 (第二部 神殿の巫女見習いIII)	March 25, 2016; 978-4-86472-473-9	April 20, 2020 (Digital); October 6, 2020 (Physical); 978-1-7183-5605-4
7	Part 2: Apprentice Shrine Maiden Vol. 4 Dai Ni-bu: Shinden no Miko Minarai 4 (第二部 神殿の巫女見習いIV)	June 10, 2016; 978-4-86472-492-0	June 23, 2020 (Digital); February 2, 2021 (Physical); 978-1-7183-5606-1
8	Part 3: Adopted Daughter of an Archduke Vol. 1 Dai San-bu: Ryōshu no Yōjo 1 (第三部 領主の養女I)	September 10, 2016; 978-4-86472-521-7	August 12, 2020 (Digital); April 6, 2021 (Physical); 978-1-7183-5607-8
9	Part 3: Adopted Daughter of an Archduke Vol.2; Dai San-bu: Ryōshu no Yōjo 2 (第三部 領主の養女II)	December 10, 2016; 978-4-86472-540-8	October 19, 2020 (Digital); August 17, 2021 (Physical); 978-1-7183-5608-5
10	Part 3: Adopted Daughter of an Archduke Vol. 3 Dai San-bu: Ryōshu no Yōjo 3 (第三部 領主の養女III)	March 10, 2017; 978-4-86472-562-0	January 4, 2021 (Digital); December 7, 2021 (Physical); 978-1-7183-5609-2
11	Part 3: Adopted Daughter of an Archduke Vol. 4 Dai San-bu: Ryōshu no Yōjo 4 (第三部 領主の養女IV)	June 10, 2017; 978-4-86472-586-6	March 8, 2021 (Digital); March 15, 2022 (Physical); 978-1-71835-610-8
12	Part 3: Adopted Daughter of an Archduke Vol. 5 Dai San-bu: Ryōshu no Yōjo 5 (第三部 領主の養女V)	September 9, 2017; 978-4-86472-600-9	May 6, 2021 (Digital); May 24, 2022 (Physical); 978-1-71834-622-2
13	Part 4: Founder of the Royal Academy's So-Called Library Committee Vol. 1 Dai Yon-bu Kizoku-in no Jishō Tosho Iin 1 (第四部 貴族院の自称図書委員I)	December 9, 2017; 978-4-86472-634-4	June 30, 2021 (Digital); July 19, 2022 (Physical); 978-1-71834-624-6
14	Part 4: Founder of the Royal Academy's So-Called Library Committee Vol. 2 Dai Yon-bu: Kizoku-in no Jishō Tosho Iin 2 (第四部 貴族院の自称図書委員II)	March 10, 2018; 978-4-86472-669-6	September 1, 2021 (Digital); September 6, 2022 (Physical); 978-1-71834-626-0
15	Part 4: Founder of the Royal Academy's So-Called Library Committee Vol. 3 Dai Yon-bu: Kizoku-in no Jishō Tosho Iin 3 (第四部 貴族院の自称図書委員III)	June 9, 2018; 978-4-86472-686-3	October 27, 2021 (Digital); November 1, 2022 (Physical); 978-1-71834-628-4
16	Part 4: Founder of the Royal Academy's So-Called Library Committee Vol. 4 Dai Yon-bu: Kizoku-in no Jishō Tosho Iin 4 (第四部 貴族院の自称図書委員IV)	September 10, 2018; 978-4-86472-724-2	December 22, 2021 (Digital); January 17, 2023 (Physical); 978-1-71834-630-7
17	Part 4: Founder of the Royal Academy's So-Called Library Committee Vol.5; Dai Yon-bu: Kizoku-in no Jishō Tosho Iin 5 (第四部 貴族院の自称図書委員V)	December 10, 2018; 978-4-86472-764-8	February 16, 2022 (Digital); March 14, 2023 (Physical); 978-1-71834-632-1
18	Part 4: Founder of the Royal Academy's So-Called Library Committee Vol. 6 Dai Yon-bu: Kizoku-in no Jishō Tosho Iin 6 (第四部 貴族院の自称図書委員VI)	March 9, 2019; 978-4-86472-788-4	April 20, 2022 (Digital); May 16, 2023 (Physical); 978-1-71834-634-5
19	Part 4: Founder of the Royal Academy's So-Called Library Committee Vol. 7 Dai Yon-bu: Kizoku-in no Jishō Tosho Iin 7 (第四部 貴族院の自称図書委員VII)	June 10, 2019; 978-4-86472-814-0	June 15, 2022 (Digital); July 11, 2023 (Physical); 978-1-71834-636-9
20	Part 4: Founder of the Royal Academy's So-Called Library Committee Vol. 8 Dai Yon-bu: Kizoku-in no Jishō Tosho Iin 8 (第四部 貴族院の自称図書委員VIII)	September 10, 2019; 978-4-86472-828-7	August 10, 2022 (Digital); September 12, 2023 (Physical); 978-1-71834-638-3
21	Part 4: Founder of the Royal Academy's So-Called Library Committee Vol. 9 Dai Yon-bu: Kizoku-in no Jishō Tosho Iin 9 (第四部 貴族院の自称図書委員IX)	December 10, 2019; 978-4-86472-855-3	October 5, 2022 (Digital); November 14, 2023 (Physical); 978-1-71834-640-6
22	Part 5: Avatar of a Goddess Vol.1; Dai Go-bu: Megami no Keshin 1 (第五部 女神の化身I)	March 10, 2020; 978-4-86472-923-9	November 30, 2022 (Digital); January 9, 2024 (Physical); 978-1-71834-642-0
23	Part 5: Avatar of a Goddess Vol.2; Dai Go-bu Megami no Keshin 2 (第五部 女神の化身II)	June 10, 2020; 978-4-86699-001-9	January 26, 2023 (Digital); March 11, 2024 (Physical); 978-1-71834-644-4
24	Part 5: Avatar of a Goddess Vol.3; Dai Go-bu: Megami no Keshin 3 (第五部 女神の化身III)	September 10, 2020; 978-4-86699-038-5	April 5, 2023 (Digital); May 13, 2024 (Physical); 978-1-71834-646-8
25	Part 5: Avatar of a Goddess Vol. 4 Dai Go-bu: Megami no Keshin 4 (第五部 女神の化身IV)	December 10, 2020; 978-4-86699-089-7	May 31, 2023 (Digital); July 8, 2024 (Physical); 978-1-71834-648-2
26	Part 5: Avatar of a Goddess Vol. 5 Dai Go-bu: Megami no Keshin 5 (第五部 女神の化身V)	April 10, 2021; 978-4-86699-133-7	July 26, 2023 (Digital); September 10, 2024 (Physical); 978-1-71834-650-5
27	Part 5: Avatar of a Goddess Vol. 6 Dai Go-bu: Megami no Keshin 6 (第五部 女神の化身VI)	August 10, 2021; 978-4-86699-241-9	September 20, 2023 (Digital); November 12, 2024 (Physical); 978-1-71834-652-9
28	Part 5: Avatar of a Goddess Vol. 7 Dai Go-bu: Megami no Keshin 7 (第五部 女神の化身VII)	December 10, 2021; 978-4-86699-380-5	November 15, 2023 (Digital); January 14, 2025 (Physical); 978-1-71834-654-3
29	Part 5: Avatar of a Goddess Vol. 8 Dai Go-bu: Megami no Keshin 8 (第五部 女神の化身VIII)	April 9, 2022; 978-4-86699-413-0	January 10, 2024 (Digital); March 11, 2025 (Physical); 978-1-71834-656-7
30	Part 5: Avatar of a Goddess Vol. 9 Dai Go-bu: Megami no Keshin 0 (第五部 女神の化身IX)	August 10, 2022; 978-4-86699-520-5	March 20, 2024 (Digital); May 13, 2025 (Physical); 978-1-71834-658-1
31	Part 5: Avatar of a Goddess Vol. 10; Dai Go-bu: Megami no Keshin 10 (第五部 女神の化身X)	December 10, 2022; 978-4-86699-718-6	May 15, 2024 (Digital); July 15, 2025 (Physical); 978-1-71834-660-4
32	Part 5: Avatar of a Goddess Vol. 11; Dai Go-bu: Megami no Keshin 11 (第五部 女神の化身XI)	May 10, 2023; 978-4-86699-836-7	July 10, 2024 (Digital); August 12, 2025 (Physical); 978-1-71834-662-8
33	Part 5: Avatar of a Goddess Vol.12; Dai Go-bu: Megami no Keshin 12 (第五部 女神の化身XII)	December 9, 2023; 978-4-86794-022-8	September 4, 2024 (Digital); August 12, 2025 (Physical); 978-1-71834-664-2

==== Hannelore's Fifth Year at the Royal Academy ====
No.	Title	Original release date	English release date
34	Hannelore's Fifth Year at the Royal Academy Vol. 1 Hannerōre no Kizoku-in Gonensei 1 (ハンネローレの貴族院五年生1)	August 10, 2024; 978-4-86794-274-1	May 23, 2025 (Digital); March 10, 2026 (Physical); 978-1-71835-973-4; 978-1-71835-638-2
35	Hannelore's Fifth Year at the Royal Academy Vol. 2 Hannerōre no Kizoku-in Gonensei 2 (ハンネローレの貴族院五年生2)	August 10, 2025; 978-4-86794-651-0	April 13, 2026 (Digital); 978-1-71835-975-8
36	Hannelore's Fifth Year at the Royal Academy Vol. 3 Hannerōre no Kizoku-in Gonensei 3 (ハンネローレの貴族院五年生3)	April 10, 2026; 978-4-86794-926-9	—

==== Short Story Collection ====
No.	Title	Original release date	English release date
1	Short Story Collection Vol. 1 Tanpenshū 1 (短編集1)	October 10, 2019; 978-4-86472-852-2	April 24, 2023 (Digital); June 11, 2024 (Physical); 978-1-71834-674-1
2	Short Story Collection Vol. 2 Tanpenshū 2 (短編集2)	March 10, 2022; 978-4-86699-412-3	January 22, 2025 (Digital); 978-171834-676-5
3	Short Story Collection Vol. 3 Tanpenshū 3 (短編集3)	December 10, 2024; 978-4-86794-379-3	—

==== Royal Academy Stories ====
No.	Title	Original release date	English release date
1	Royal Academy Stories: First Year; Kizokuin Gaiden: Ichinensei (貴族院外伝 一年生)	October 10, 2018; 978-4-86472-732-7	July 26, 2022 (Digital); June 13, 2023 (Physical); 978-1-71835-621-4

=== Manga ===
A manga adaptation was published by TO Books and follows similar format as the novels. Part 1, subtitled If There are No Books, I Just Have to Make Some! (本がないなら作ればいい!, Hon ga nai nara Tsukureba ī!), was illustrated by Suzuka, serialized in Comic Corona from October 2015 to July 2018, and was compiled into a total of seven volumes. Suzuka continued to illustrate Part 2, subtitled I'll Even Join the Temple to Read Books! (本のためなら巫女になる！, Hon no tamenara miko ni naru!), serialized in Comic Corona from September 2018 to September 2025, and was compiled into a total of thirteen volumes. Part 3, subtitled Let's Spread Books Through the Duchy! (領地に本を広げよう！, Ryōchi ni Hon o Hirogeyou!), is illustrated by Ryo Namino and began serialization in Comic Corona despite Part 1 still being ongoing at the time. Part 3 currently has ten volumes. Part 4, I Want to Save the Royal Academy's Library! (貴族院の図書館を救いたい！, Kizoku-in no Toshokan o Sukuitai!), is illustrated by Hikaru Katsuki and began serialization on December 24, 2020, also in Comic Corona and currently has a total of eleven volumes. The manga adaptation is also published in English by J-Novel Club. Part 5, illustrated by Suzuka, began serialization on January 19, 2026.

A sequel, subtitled Ascendance of a Bookworm: Hannelore's Fifth Year at the Royal Academy (A Princess Who Wants to Fall in Love) (本好きの下剋上 ～ハンネローレの貴族院五年生～ 「恋してみたいお姫様」, Honzuki no Gekokujou: Han'nerōre no Kizoku-in Gonensei (Koishite Mitai Ohime-sama)), is illustrated by Rei Kusakabe and began serialization in Comic Corona on September 22, 2025.

==== Part 1 ====
No.	Original release date	Original ISBN	English release date	English ISBN
1	June 25, 2016	978-4-86472-495-1	June 18, 2019	978-1-7183-3800-5
1. A New Life; 2. Books: Unobtainable; 3. Lifestyle Overhaul; 4. Learning to Respect Egyptian Culture; 5. Winter Preparations; Extra: Myne's Gotten Weird
2	July 10, 2016	978-4-86472-499-9	December 3, 2019	978-1-7183-3802-9
6. Pig Killing Day; 7. The Sweet Taste of Winter; 8. Helping Out Otto; 9. Bring Me to the Forest; 10. Finally the Forest; Extra: Lutz and the Parue Tree
3	November 10, 2016	978-4-86472-533-0	March 25, 2020	978-1-7183-3804-3
11. I Love You, Yellow River Culture; 12. The Mysterious Heat and the Meeting; 12.5. Result of the Meeting; 13. Road to Washi; 14. Summons From Benno; Extra: Improving the Food Situation; Story: The Baptism Ceremony and the Hairpin
4	February 25, 2017	978-4-86472-554-5	May 13, 2020	978-1-7183-3806-7
15. Lutz's Most Important Job; 16. Beginning to Make Paper; 17. Lutz's Myne; 18. The Merchant's Guild; 19. Temporary Registration and a Business Discussion; Extra: Coins and the Value of Things; Story: Zeg the Apprentice Craftsman
5	August 1, 2017	978-4-86472-602-3	August 12, 2020	978-1-71833-808-1
20. The Guildmaster's Granddaughter; 21. Freida's Hairpins; 22. Improving Rinsham; 23. A Trombe Appears; 24. Nearing Winter; Extra: The Power of Money; Story: Hairpins and the Meeting of Stores
6	February 24, 2018	978-4-86472-664-1	February 10, 2021	978-1-71833-810-4
25. Freida and Myne; 26. The Beginning of Winter; 27. Family Meeting; 28. Resuming Paper-Making; 29. Vested Interests; Extra: Some Time in the Woods; Story: A Long-Awaited Reunion
7	August 1, 2018	978-4-86472-720-4	May 12, 2021	978-1-71833-812-8
30. Freida's Contract and the Baptism Ceremony; 31. God-Given Paradise; 32. Becoming an Apprentice Shrine Maiden; 33. Confrontation; 33.5. Negotiations in the High Priest's Chamber; Extra: The Pound Cake Taste-Test Event; Story: As the Gilberta Company's Successor

==== Part 2 ====
No.	Original release date	Original ISBN	English release date	English ISBN
1	April 25, 2019	978-4-86472-801-0	July 7, 2021	978-1-71833-814-2
1. Apprentice Shrine Maiden in the Temple; 2. Meeting in the Temple; 3. Why I Collapsed; 4. What They Deserve; Extra: How to Handle the Myne Workshop; Story: Fran and the Commoner Apprentice Blue Shrine Maiden
2	October 5, 2019	978-4-86472-853-9	September 1, 2021	978-1-71833-816-6
5. Gil's Job; 6. Everyone Has a Job to Do; 7. My Third Attendant; 8. The Reality of the Orphanage; 9. A Secret Talk with the High Priest; Extra: Sister Myne and Me; Story: The Other Side of the Orphanage Incident
3	April 1, 2020	978-4-86472-941-3	November 10, 2021	978-1-71837-259-7
10. The Great Orphanage Cleanup; 11. The Orphanage Director's Visit; 12. Growing Problems; 13. Diptychs and Karuta; 14. Preparing for the Star Festival; 15. The Star Festival; Extra: Ordering Ceremonial Robes; Story: Gathering Taues
4	October 1, 2020	978-4-86699-056-9	March 16, 2022	978-1-71833-820-3
16. Lutz's Path; 17. Running Away from Home; 18. Family Meeting at the Temple; 19. One Wilma, Please; 20. Gifts and an Education; Extra: My Son's Growth; Story: This Thing Called Family
5	April 15, 2021	978-4-86699-203-7	May 4, 2022	978-1-71833-822-7
21. My New Attendants; 22. Attendants of an Apprentice Blue Shrine Maiden; 22.5. Christine's Former Attendants; 23. Preparing to Make Ink; 24. Making Ink; 25. Challenging Woodblock Printing; Extra: Problems with the Italian Restaurant; Story: Preparing for the Baby
6	October 15, 2021	978-4-86699-346-1	August 17, 2022	978-1-71833-824-1
26. Suspicions and a New Connection; 27. Preparing Stencils; 28. Binding a Picture-Book Bible for Children; 29. After Completing the Picture Book; 30. The Myne Decimal System; 31. Starting Winter Prep; Extra: The Story of Cinderella; Story: Books and Karuta
7	April 15, 2022	978-4-86699-416-1	February 6, 2023	978-1-71833-826-5
32. Buying Winter Clothes; 33. Winter Preparations and the Knight's Order; 34. Trombe Extermination; 35. During the Trombe Hunt; 36. Rescue and Reprimand; Extra: Mental Image; Story: My First Trombe Hunt
8	December 1, 2022	978-4-86699-689-9	January 24, 2024	978-1-71833-827-2
37. Returning from the Hunt; 38. The World of Dreams; 39. After Synchronizing; 40. Johann's Tasks and the Ink Guild; 41. Hunkering Down for the Winter; 41.5. At the Karstedt Estate; Extra: Exploring the World of Dreams; Story: Coming-of-Age Task
9	June 1, 2023	978-4-86699-855-8	April 17, 2024	978-1-7183-3828-9
42. Punishment and the Future; 43. The Dedication Ritual; 44. Rosina's Coming-of-Age Ceremony; 45. Winter's Close; Extra: New Sweets; Story: The Knight Who Came to the Temple
10	December 15, 2023	978-4-86794-029-7	November 12, 2025	978-1-7183-3829-6
46. Spring Prayer; 47. Ambush; 48. After the Ambush; 49. Touring the Orphanage; 50. The Blue Priest's Gift; Extra: Postmeal Gathering; Story: The Ambush and the Charm
11	July 16, 2024	978-4-86794-244-4	May 6, 2026	978-1-7183-3831-9
51. A New Member of the Family; 52. A Baby Left Behind; 53. Successors of the Ink Workshop; 54. Trial and Error; 55. Dirk and Delia; Bonus: Caring for Kamil; Story: New Ink and a Strange Girl
12	February 15, 2025	978-4-86794-455-4	—	—
13	September 15, 2025	978-4-86794-698-5	—	—

==== Part 3 ====
No.	Original release date	Original ISBN	English release date	English ISBN
1	February 1, 2019	978-4-86472-784-6	June 7, 2023	978-1-71833-801-2
1. The Daughter of a Noble; 2. The Archduke's Adopted Daughter; 3. The Adopted Daughter's New Guard Knights; 4. The High Bishop Inauguration Ceremony; 5. Reunion with the Gilberta Company; 6. In the Hidden Room; 7. The Starbind Ceremony (Lower City); Extra: The Knight Commander's Youngest Son; Story: My First Letter
2	December 14, 2019	978-4-86472-881-2	October 11, 2023	978-1-71833-803-6
8. The Archduke's Castle; 9. Italian Restaurant; 10. Hasse's Monastery; 11. How to Secure Funding; 12. My First Magecraft Lesson; 13. The Path to Wax Stencils; Extra: Benno and Gustav's Suffering; Story: Changes at Home
3	June 15, 2020	978-4-86699-003-3	August 14, 2024	978-1-71833-805-0
14. Picture of Ferdinand; 15. Johann and Zack; 16. Reunion with Tuuli; 17. Lamprecht and Elvira Attack; 18. Forming a Highbeast!; 19. Completing the Wax Paper; Extra: Less and Me (1 and 2); Story: All to See Myne
4	May 15, 2021	978-4-86699-220-4	December 3, 2024	978-1-71833-807-4
20. The Harspiel Concert; 21. The Little High Bishop; 22. Meeting for the Harvest Festival; 23. Inspecting the Monastery; 24. Hasse's Orphans; Extra: Unwavering Emotions; Story: From Tasty Food to Trouble
5	March 15, 2022	978-4-86699-415-4	January 14, 2026	978-1-71833-809-8
25. Hasse's Orphans and the Monastery; 26. Attack on the Monastery; 27. A New Task; 28. Concerning Hasse; 29. The Plan for Hasse; Extra: Hugo and the Chefs; Story: Night at the Monastery
6	February 15, 2023	978-4-86699-768-1	—	—
7	September 15, 2023	978-4-86699-946-3	—	—
8	August 17, 2024	978-4-86794-279-6	—	—
9	July 15, 2025	978-4-86794-628-2	—	—
10	July 15, 2026	978-4-86794-945-0	—	—

Part 3: Spin-off: At Ferdinand's House (フェルディナンドの館にて, Ferudinando no Kan ni te)

No.	Original release date	Original ISBN	English release date	English ISBN
1	July 15, 2026	978-4-86854-070-0	—	—

==== Part 4 ====
No.	Original release date	Original ISBN	English release date	English ISBN
1	March 15, 2021	978-4-86699-132-0	February 26, 2025	978-1-71832-967-6
1. Call Me Urashima Taro; 2. Dinner and Cramming; 3. To the Royal Academy; Extra: What I Know; Story: Fruitless Anxieties
2	July 15, 2021	978-4-86699-249-5	April 16, 2025	978-1-71832-968-3
4. Life at the Royal Academy; 5. The Better Grades Committee; 6. The Royal Family and Nobles of Other Duchies; 7. Math, Theology, and Mana Control; Extra: Cornelius's Resolve; Story: After Her Departure
3	November 25, 2021	978-4-86699-350-8	June 4, 2025	978-1-71832-969-0
8. History, Geography, and Music; 9. Highbeast Creation; 10. Mana Compression and an Invitation; 11. Library Registration; Extra: A Sweet Reward; Story: Out of My Lady's Sight
4	May 14, 2022	978-4-86699-512-0	July 30, 2025	978-1-71832-970-6
12. Schwartz, Weiss and Etiquette; 13. Passing Court Etiquette and Hirschur's Arrival; 14. Schtappe Acquisition; 15. The First Earthday; 16. Dedication Whirling; Extra: Secret Consultation; Story: As Lady Rozemyne's Retainer
5	November 15, 2022	978-4-86699-690-5	September 17, 2025	978-1-71832-971-3
17. Dedication Whirling and Music Class; 18. Passing Highbeast Creation and Schtappe Fundamentals; 19. Passing Schtappe Fundamentals; 20. Wilfried and Roderick; 21. To the Library!; Extra: An Exciting Morning; Story: An Update on Rozemyne's Classes
6	May 15, 2023	978-4-86699-847-3	March 11, 2026	978-1-71832-972-0
22. One Library Committee, Please!; 23. My First Royal Academy Tea Party; 24. Tea Party with the Professors; 25. Measuring Schwartz and Weiss; 26. Protecting Schwartz and Weiss; Extra: Lisaleta's Resolve; Story: Tea Party with the Music Professors
7	November 15, 2023	978-4-86794-001-3	—	—
8	May 15, 2024	978-4-86794-177-5	—	—
9	December 14, 2024	978-4-86794-381-6	—	—
10	April 15, 2025	978-4-86794-539-1	—	—
11	November 15, 2025	978-4-8679-4770-8	—	—
12	April 15, 2026	978-4-8679-4944-3	—	—

==== Part 5 ====
No.	Original release date	Original ISBN	English release date	English ISBN
1	April 15, 2026	978-4-86794-946-7	—	—

==== Hannelore's Fifth Year at the Royal Academy ====
No.	Original release date	Original ISBN	English release date	English ISBN
1	December 10, 2025	978-4-8679-4782-1	—	—

=== Anime ===
An anime television series adaptation was announced on March 7, 2019. The series is animated by Ajiado and directed by Mitsuru Hongo, with Mariko Kunisawa handling series composition, Yoshiaki Yanagida and Toshihisa Kaiya designing the characters, and Michiru composing the series' music.

The first season ran for 14 episodes, which aired from October 3 to December 26, 2019, on ABC Television, Tokyo MX, Wowow, and BS Fuji, (Note: Wowow listed the show at 24:30 on October 2, which is 12:30 AM on October 3, 2019.) and covers Part 1: Daughter of a Soldier of the light novel. Sumire Morohoshi performed the series' opening theme song "Mashiro" (真っ白, Masshiro), while Megumi Nakajima performed the series' ending theme song "Kamikazari no Tenshi" (髪飾りの天使). A two-part OVA series (numbered collectively as episode 14.5, both airing on March 9, 2020) consisted of two parts titled "Eustachius' Incognito Operation Downtown" and "Visiting Missus Corinna".

The second season ran for 12 episodes, which aired from April 5 to June 21, 2020, and covers Volumes 1 and 2 of Part 2: Apprentice Shrine Maiden of the light novel. Sumire Morohoshi also performed the second season's opening theme song "Tsumujikaze" (旋風; Commotion), while Minori Suzuki performs the ending theme "Ephemera wo Atsumete".

The production of a third season was announced on July 12, 2020, which ran for 10 episodes and aired from April 12 to June 14, 2022, on ytv and other channels, (Note: Yomiuri TV listed the show at 26:29 on April 11, which is 2:29 AM on April 12, 2022.) and covers Volumes 3 and 4 of Part 2: Apprentice Shrine Maiden of the light novel. Nao Tōyama performed the third season's opening theme song "Ano Hi no Kotoba" (あの日のことば), while Maaya Sakamoto performed the ending theme song "Kotoba ni Dekinai" (言葉にできない).

A fourth season by Wit Studio covering Part 3: Adopted Daughter of an Archduke of the light novel was announced on December 6, 2023. The season is directed by Yoshiaki Iwasaki, with Aiko Minowa as the new character designer and the rest of the staff and cast reprising their roles. It aired for 24 episodes from April 4 to October 3, 2026, on all NNS affiliate stations, including ytv and Nippon TV as well as Tokyo MX. Little Glee Monster performed the fourth season's opening theme song "Pages".

A fifth season covering Part 4: Founder of the Royal Academy's So-Called Library Committee of the light novel was announced after the fourth season's finale. It will also be produced by Wit Studio.

Crunchyroll streamed the series and has partnered with Sentai Filmworks for distribution in North America.

=== Other ===
Nine fanbooks were published by TO Books and released on December 20, 2016, December 9, 2017, November 10, 2018, November 9, 2019, November 10, 2020, November 10, 2021, November 10, 2022, November 10, 2023, and November 9, 2024. TO Books also published eleven Drama CDs released on September 9, 2017, June 9, 2018, June 10, 2019, December 10, 2019, September 10, 2020, August 10, 2021, April 9, 2022, August 10, 2022, May 10, 2023, December 9, 2023, and August 10, 2024.

== Reception ==
The series had sold over 11 million copies across physical and digital sales combined by July 2024. By August 2026, it had sold over 14 million copies. The series ranked fifth in 2017, first in 2018 and 2019, second in 2020 and 2021, third in 2022 and first in 2023, before being added to Hall of Fame in Takarajimasha's annual light novel guide book Kono Light Novel ga Sugoi!, in the tankōbon category.

In 2017, the manga adaptation was ranked seventh at the third Next Manga Awards in the web category.

The 2nd season of anime was nominated for "Best Fantasy" in 2021's Crunchyroll Anime Awards.

Steven Pearce, writing for The Encyclopedia of Science Fiction, described the series as an enjoyable, understated portrayal of everyday life in a medieval-style fantasy setting, praising its explanations of early bookmaking techniques and mercantile economics. He compared its early episodes to timeslip stories popularized by L Sprague de Camp in which protagonists introduce inventions ahead of their time. Pearce observed that magical elements initially served mainly as convenient plot devices, but became more important toward the end of the first season. He also noted the contrast between the series' generally light tone and its portrayal of the nobility as a threatening political force.
