= Telenet Shooting Collection =

- Japanese cover art
- Developer: Edia
- Publisher: Edia
- Platform: Nintendo Switch
- Release: June 8, 2023
- Genre: Shoot 'em up
- Mode: Single-player

Telenet Shooting Collection is a compilation of shoot 'em up games developed by the now-defunct studio Telenet Japan and published by Edia for the Nintendo Switch. It was released on June 8, 2023, in Japan.

== Content ==
Telenet Shooting Collection compiles four high-definition ports of shoot 'em up games developed by Telenet Japan: Granada (1990), Gaiares (1990), Avenger (1990), and Psychic Storm (1992). The ports of Granada and Gaiares are based on the Sega Genesis versions of the games while the ports of Avenger and Psychic Storm use the PC Engine versions of the games. Each game will have additional features such as new "Sound Modes", a new "Visual Mode", a rewind feature, and other added features and updates.

== Development and Release ==
In 2020, Edia bought the rights to Telenet Japan's intellectual properties from City Connection. They then proceeded to release two collections of games from the Valis series on Nintendo Switch. On November 17, 2022, Edia launched a website featuring characters and the ship from Gaiares with a tagline of "New Project begins" on November 22, 2022. On November 22, 2022, the game was officially announced with the motto of "Welcome to Shooters Heaven!" as the first game in Edia's "Telenet Revival Project" to support the "Re;Birth of Beautiful Retro Games". A crowdfunding campaign was announced the same day on Makuake seeking to raise three million yen (roughly $21,160) to cover the game's development and marketing. On January 22, 2023, the game was officially slated for a release on June 8, 2023, in Japan. A special edition was also revealed which would include an original figure of the "Storm Bringer" ship from Psychic Storm.

=== Telenet Shooting Collection II ===
Telenet Shooting Collection II was announced for the Nintendo Switch on May 11, 2025, which includes Browning, Final Zone II, Kiaidan 00, and Legion. It was released on August 28, 2025.
