= Eagle Eye Golf =

2005 video game

- Developer: Telenet Japan
- Publishers: Aksys Games (US); 505 GameStreet (UK)
- Platform: PlayStation 2
- Release: JP: June 23, 2005; UK: June 30, 2006; US: October 10, 2006
- Genre: Sports
- Modes: Single-player; Multiplayer

Eagle Eye Golf is a golf video game developed by Telenet Japan for the PlayStation 2. It was originally released in Japan in 2005, as Enjoy Golf! The following year, it was published in the US and UK as Eagle Eye Golf. It received "mixed or average" reviews according to Metacritic.

== Gameplay ==
Eagle Eye Golf has several playable golfers with a limited number of customization options. The game has seven fictional golf courses and includes a course creator, allowing the player to design courses with custom features such as slopes and hazards. Most of the seven courses, as well as golfing items, can be unlocked by playing through the various game modes, such as Tournament. Other modes include Training, in which the player can practice golfing; and Mission, in which the player must complete a series of specific golf moves. The game also includes a multiplayer option for up to three additional players, with use of the PlayStation Multitap.

== Reception ==
Reception

Aggregate score
Aggregator	Score
Metacritic	58/100

Review scores
Publication	Score
GamesMaster	61/100
GameSpot	5.2/10
GamesRadar+	2.5/5
IGN	6/10
Play	73/100
VideoGamer.com	6/10
PlayStation World	5/10
PSM2	50/100

Eagle Eye Golf received "mixed or average" reviews according to Metacritic. Critics found the game to be a mix between realistic golf simulation games and arcade-like golf games. PlayStation World called it "a decent, if somewhat dull game" with "a style that sits comfortably between arcade and full simulation". GamesMaster described it as a cross between the Tiger Woods and Mario Golf series, writing, "It's fairly enjoyable, though, rather than the mix 'n match we expected". Tom Orry of VideoGamer.com considered it inferior to the Tiger Woods series, but "as a simple, fun little golf game, it's not bad at all". He further called it "a very solid, albeit slightly too expensive, little game".

Jeff Haynes of IGN found it less accessible and engaging than the Hot Shots Golf series. He considered the course editor to be among the game's best features. Aaron Thomas of GameSpot called it an "absolutely shameless" copy of the Hot Shots series, while writing that its own unique features make up some of the game's "weakest points". Greg Sewart of GamesRadar wrote that Eagle Eye Golf "emulates the Hot Shots series right down to the font and colors used in the logo. You almost feel guilty even playing it".

The graphics were generally criticized, with Sewart calling attention to the "extremely generic-looking anime-style" characters. Orry stated that it "is far from an ugly game, but it doesn't push the limit of the PlayStation 2 either. Player models and courses are functional, but lacking in detail, and rather than being part of a whole course, each hole is rendered on its own, so you don't get the sense of being there" as in other golf games. Haynes felt a sense of isolation, noting "there's no gallery with bystanders, no visual hint that anyone else is on the green, and no caddy or other players around on a course".

The sound also received some criticism, with Thomas writing that the music "is simply dreadful and doesn't fit the game well at all". Orry stated that golfers "will often shout out odd little things", while Haynes was critical of "random comments that are thrown out as you take your time to address the ball", writing that the game "can be impatient, and admonish you for taking your time". Thomas also found the comments annoying: "The game is relentless with these idiotic quips, and unless you hit the ball right away, the CPU will pepper you with obnoxious sound bites chiding you to play faster".

== See also ==
- Swingerz Golf, a 2002 game also by Telenet
