= Psycho Dream =

1992 video game

- Developer: Riot
- Publisher: Riot
- Director: Kenichi Nishi
- Producers: Masayasu Yamamoto; Takashi Fukushima
- Designer: Marino Nishizaki
- Programmer: Masayasu Yamamoto
- Composer: Michiko Naruke
- Platforms: Super Famicom; PlayStation 4 PlayStation 5 Nintendo Switch; Xbox Series X|S; Windows
- Release: JP: December 11, 1992
- Genre: Platform
- Mode: Single-player

Psycho Dream (Note: Japanese: サイコドリーム, Hepburn: Saiko Doriimu) is a platform game developed and published by Riot for the Super Famicom and released in 1992. Riot was a division of Telenet Japan.

== Gameplay ==
Gameplay screenshot. Maria fights against the game's first boss at the end of Track 1.

The player takes control of either Ryō or Maria. Ryō is a swordsman while Maria is an angelic warrior who uses either a whip, a laser gun, or metal claws. Demons can even be summoned to destroy most of the monsters on the screen. Many of the stages are set against the backdrop of 20th century Japan.

Having a limited amount of time to defeat enemies, the focus is on advancing through the stages as quickly as possible.

== Plot ==
In the early 1980s, rumors begin to circulate about a new entertainment medium called "D Movie", which allows people to immerse themselves in a world of virtual reality. As D Movies gain traction, a trend emerges of disaffected young people taking permanent refuge in the virtual world while abandoning their physical bodies to atrophy. To retrieve these so-called "Sinkers", Japan's National Public Safety Commission establishes Public Security Division Four (公安四課, Kōan Yonka), nicknamed "Diamond Dog" (ダイアモンドの犬, Daiamondo no Inu), in 1984. The agents who enter the virtual world and perform these rescues are known as Debuggers.

In 1992, a seventeen-year-old girl named Yūki Sayaka (柚木沙耶香) sinks into "Story of the Ruined Capital" (廃都物語, Haito Monogatari), a D Movie directed by David Visconti. Three days pass before she is discovered, and combined with her weak constitution, she is expected to die within twenty-four hours. Two Debuggers, Ryō Shijima and Maria Tobari, are dispatched to rescue her before that happens.

== Development and release ==
Psycho Dream was directed by Kenichi Nishi. It was released in Japan on the Super Famicom on December 11, 1992. A North American localization was planned by Telenet Japan subsidiary Renovation Products, but was never released. It would have been their second release following Doomsday Warrior. In their 1994 SNES catalog, Nintendo Power mistakenly listed Dream Probe as having been released in September 1993.

Psycho Dream was made available through the Nintendo Classics service on February 17, 2021. It was also released on modern consoles and PC in September 2025 as a port developed by Ratalaika Games. The port features translated versions of the game's in-universe copyright disclaimer at the start. Localized versions for Super Nintendo will be released in September 2026 by Retro-Bit and Renovation Products in North America and parts of Europe.

== Reception ==
Reception

Review scores
Publication	Score
Electronic Gaming Monthly	21/40
Famitsu	5/10, 4/10, 5/10, 4/10
Joypad	68%
Super Play	33%
Game Power	75%
Hippon Super!	5/10
Marukatsu Super Famicom	6/10, 6/10, 7/10, 7/10
The Super Famicom	63/100

Famitsu gave it an 18/40. Fan reception was mixed: readers of Famimaga voted to give the game a 17.43 out of 30 score, ranking at the number 292 spot in a poll, indicating a middling following. Reviewing the planned localization, three reviewers at Electronic Gaming Monthly gave a score of 5/10 and a fourth gave a 6/10. Super Play gave the game a 33% score. Italian magazine Game Power gave it 75%.
