= Ninja Hayate =

1984 video game

- Japanese arcade flyer
- Developers: Taito (arcade); Wolf Team (Mega CD); Ecseco (Saturn/PS1); Malone Films
- Publishers: Taito (arcade); Wolf Team; Renovation; Sega (Sega CD); Ecseco (Saturn/PS1); Malone Films
- Designer: Toei Company
- Platforms: Arcade, Sega CD, PlayStation, Sega Saturn
- Release: November 1984: Arcade; JP: December 1984 Sega CD; NA: 1994 PlayStation; JP: July 5, 1996 Saturn; JP: January 17, 1997
- Genres: Action game, interactive movie
- Modes: Up to 2 players, alternating turns

Ninja Hayate (忍者ハヤテ) is a 1984 LaserDisc video game developed and released by Taito and Malone Films for arcades in Japan and the United States. The game was later ported to the Sega CD as Revenge of the Ninja in 1994.

== Arcade game ==
The game tells the story of a skilled and daring teenage ninja named Hayate, infiltrating an evil castle in an attempt to rescue a princess he loves. Hayate must survive a collection of deathtraps and defeat a variety of mythological creatures and other adversaries on his quest to save the princess and destroy the castle.

The game draws players to guide Hayate with a joystick for moving him around and one button for using weapons through 15 different stages that take place in feudal Japan-based areas. There are three difficulty levels.

Like earlier LaserDisc games such as Don Bluth's Dragon's Lair, Ninja Hayate contains traps and creatures that requires players to dodge or attack them at specific moments, by watching for the warning buzzer (like Dragon's Lair) in addition to flashing objects (e.g., arrows, buttons, light, etc.). If a player makes a mistake, one life decreases, and when players run out of lives, the game ends.

Unlike Don Bluth's LaserDisc games, Ninja Hayate is animated with anime drawings by Toei Animation. Another difference is that the game flashes the buttons that need to be pressed directly on the screen. Sometimes it also flashes multiple possible button presses on screen, indicating different paths that the player can take. Another difference is that some traps are randomly generated, so that the game is not identical every playthrough.

== Home versions ==
The Sega CD version was published by Renovation Products, Telenet Japan's North American subsidiary. Renovation sent "Master of the Ninja Arts" diplomas to players who mailed them photographic proof that they had beaten the game on hard mode. Revenge of the Ninja was also later converted by Ecseco to the Sega Saturn and PlayStation. These versions were released only in Japan as part of a double bill with Time Gal, another animated LaserDisc arcade game conversion made by Taito, as Interactive Movie Action - Time Gal and Ninja Hayate.

== Reception ==
Reviews (Sega CD)

Review scores
Publication	Score
Electronic Gaming Monthly	32/50
GamePro	3.5/5
Hyper	32%
Joypad	80%

In Japan, Game Machine listed Ninja Hayate as the fourth most successful upright/cockpit arcade unit of January 1985. It was later listed as the top-grossing upright/cockpit arcade unit of February 1985.

GamePro gave the Sega CD version a mixed review, considering the game to be inferior to Dragon's Lair and Time Gal with the gameplay lacking in "dramatics" and with "grainy and soupy looking" graphics. They said players "won't be disappointed" if they "like these types of games" but if they don't, they should avoid the game. The five reviewers of Electronic Gaming Monthly gave it a 32 out of 50 (8, 7, 5, 6 and 6 out of 10), commenting that the gameplay relies more on memorization than anything else. Although positive to game's animation, they said that it is more a treat to watch than to play.

== See also ==
- List of LaserDisc games
- The Legend of Kage
- Time Gal
