= Earnest Evans =

1991 video game

- Developer: Wolf Team
- Publishers: JP: Wolf Team; NA: Renovation Products
- Director: Yukihiko Tani
- Producer: Masaaki Uno
- Programmer: Yukihiko Tani
- Composer: Motoi Sakuraba
- Platforms: Mega-CD, Genesis
- Release: Mega-CD: JP: December 20, 1991; Genesis: NA: March 1992
- Genre: Platform
- Mode: Single-player

Earnest Evans is a 1991 platform game by Wolf Team. It was self-published in Japan for the Sega Mega-CD and the Sega Genesis in North America by Renovation Products three months later. As with Sol-Feace, the Mega-CD release has a Mixed Mode CD soundtrack along with animated cutscenes created by Madhouse.

Earnest Evans is the second game (but first chronologically) of a trilogy which also includes El Viento (1991) and Annet Returns (1993). All three games were re-released in Japan in December 2025 as part of the Earnest Evans Collection. A western localization of the collection was later released in January 2026.

== Gameplay ==
Earnest attacking a stonehead with his signature whip

As a 2D side-scrolling game in which the hero uses a whip, the gameplay and design are often compared to the Castlevania series. In addition to the whip, there are three other weapons to be found; however, they are only used once in certain areas. The three additional weapons are exploding rocks, a morning star, and a hammerlike weapon. The adventure takes Earnest to destinations which include raiding tombs in Mexico, Peru, moving trains, a forest, and the Grand Canyons, while attempting to save the world. Unlike most platform games on the Genesis/Mega Drive, the character Earnest Evans is made up of several sprites to give him a fluid ragdoll-like movement.

== Plot ==
=== Mega-CD version ===
Earnest and Annet after meeting in the Peruvian ruins

=== Genesis version ===
Reception

Review scores
Publication	Score
GamePro	19/25
GameZone	90/100
IGN	3/10
Joystick	80%
Ação Games	12/20
Mega Play	22/40
Mega Power	3/5
MegaTech	50%

In the 1930s, a man known as Earnest Evans learned of three ancient idols which hold enough power to destroy the Earth. Evans decided to search the world to find the scattered idols, but was injured before he could find all three. Now, many years later, his grandson, Earnest Evans III, continues his grandfather's quest to save humanity from total annihilation. However, a rival treasure hunter named Brady Tresidder also seeks the idols to bring the world's destruction. Evans must find the treasures before Tresidder does. During his journey, Evans stumbles upon a green-haired girl named Annet Myer in some ruins in Peru who decides to accompany him for the rest of his adventures. The two encounter a mysterious figure by the name of Sigfried, who has unknown motives, but seems to know a lot about Hastur and his cult.
