= A-Rank Thunder Tanjouhen =

1993 video game

- Developer(s): Telenet Japan
- Publisher(s): Riot
- Platform(s): Mega-CD
- Release: JP: June 25, 1993
- Genre(s): Adventure
- Mode(s): Single-player

A-Rank Thunder Tanjouhen (Aランクサンダー 誕生編) is an adventure game released in 1993 on Mega-CD. The game was developed by Telenet Japan, and published by its label Riot. The game's cover art was created by Yasushi Nirasawa, in his position as a model-builder for Hobby Japan magazine.

== Gameplay ==
The game is an RPG adventure game consisting of four stages.

== Reception ==
The Japanese magazine Famitsu gave it a score of 22 out of 40.
