= Jennifer Capriati =

American former tennis player (born 1976)

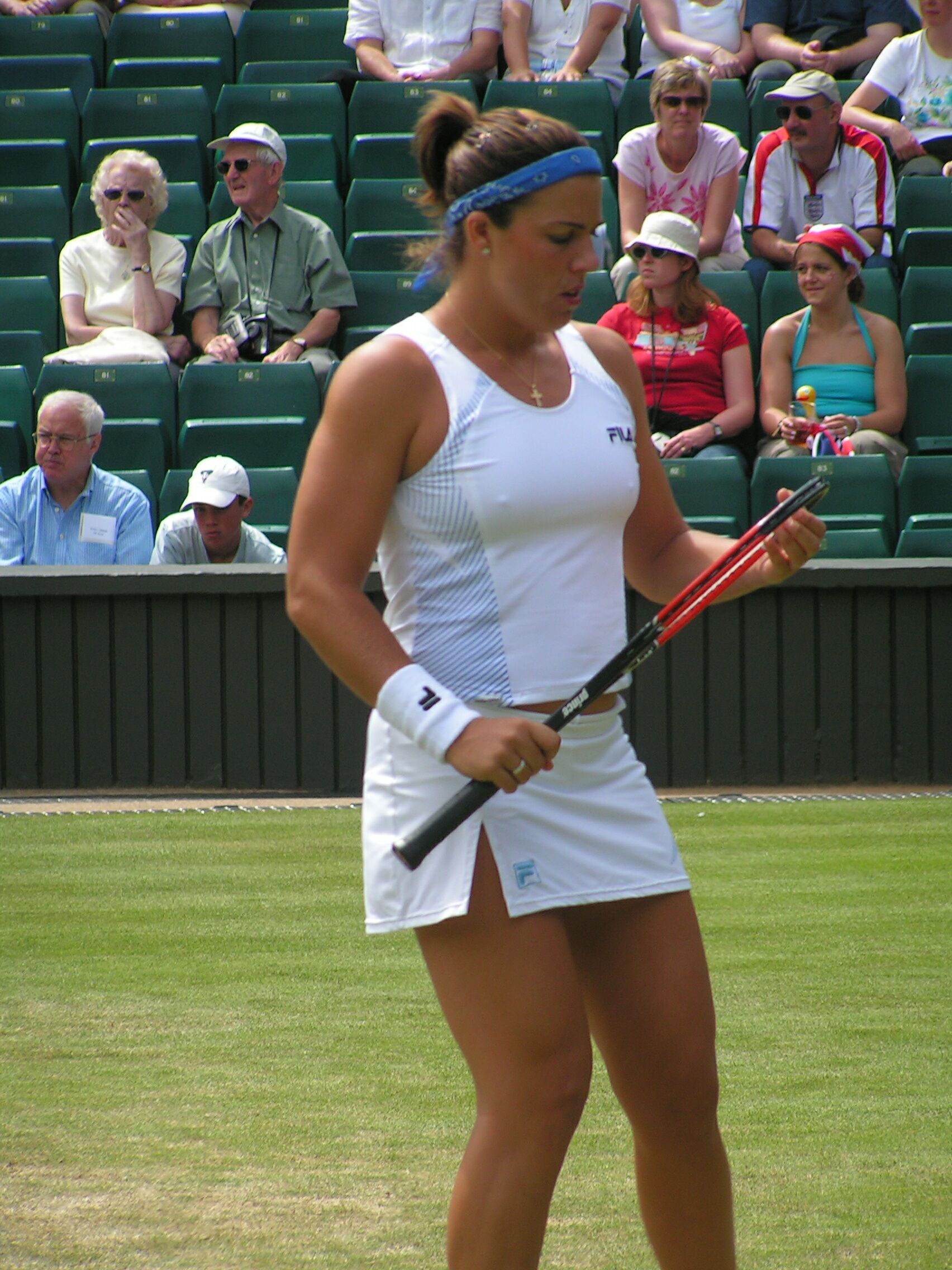
- Capriati at the 2004 Wimbledon Championships
- Full name: Jennifer Maria Capriati
- Country (sports): United States
- Residence: Wesley Chapel, Florida, US
- Born: March 29, 1976 (age 50) New York City, US
- Height: 172 cm (5 ft 7 1/2 in)
- Turned pro: March 1990
- Retired: 2004
- Plays: Right-handed (two-handed backhand)
- Prize money: US$ 10,206,639
- Int. Tennis HoF: 2012 (member page)

Singles
- Career record: 430–176
- Career titles: 14
- Highest ranking: No. 1 (October 15, 2001)

Grand Slam singles results
- Australian Open: W (2001, 2002)
- French Open: W (2001)
- Wimbledon: SF (1991, 2001)
- US Open: SF (1991, 2001, 2003, 2004)

Other tournaments
- Tour Finals: SF (2002, 2003)
- Olympic Games: W (1992)

Doubles
- Career record: 66–50
- Career titles: 1
- Highest ranking: No. 28 (March 2, 1992)

Grand Slam doubles results
- Australian Open: 3R (2000)
- French Open: 3R (2000, 2001)
- Wimbledon: 3R (1991, 2000)
- US Open: QF (2001)
Medal record
Women's tennis
Representing the United States
Olympic Games
Gold medal – first place	1992 Barcelona	Singles

Jennifer Maria Capriati (born March 29, 1976) is an American former professional tennis player. She was ranked as the world No. 1 in women's singles by the Women's Tennis Association (WTA) for 17 weeks. Capriati won 14 WTA Tour-level singles titles, including three majors at the 2001 Australian Open, 2001 French Open, and 2002 Australian Open, and an Olympic gold medal at the 1992 Barcelona Olympics.

Capriati set a number of youngest-ever records. She made her professional debut in 1990 at the age of 13 years, 11 months, reaching the final of the Boca Raton tournament. She reached the semifinals of the 1990 French Open on her debut and later became the youngest-ever player to reach the top 10, at age 14 years, 235 days, in October of that year. Following a first-round loss at the 1993 US Open, she took a 14-month break from professional tennis. Her personal struggles during this time (including arrests for shoplifting and possession of marijuana) were well documented by the press.

In 1998, Capriati won her first major-level singles match in five years at Wimbledon. During the next two years, she slowly returned to championship form, winning her first title in six years in Strasbourg in 1999 and regaining a top-20 ranking. At the 2001 Australian Open, the reinvigorated Capriati became the lowest seed ever to win the championship when she defeated Martina Hingis in straight sets for her first Grand Slam championship. She also won the French Open that year, claiming the WTA No. 1 ranking in October. After successfully defending her Australian Open title in 2002, she became a top-10 mainstay until injuries derailed her career in 2004. Capriati was inducted into the International Tennis Hall of Fame in 2014.

== Career ==
=== 1990–1991: The records ===
Capriati won the Junior Orange Bowl in both the 12- and the 14-year categories, and is one of only nine tennis players to win the Junior Orange Bowl Championship twice in its 70-year history, which list includes Andy Murray, Jimmy Connors, Monica Seles, and Yishai Oliel.

Capriati made her professional debut as a 13-year-old, reaching the finals of two of her first three pro events, losing to Gabriela Sabatini and Martina Navratilova in the Boca Raton and Hilton Head tournaments, respectively, earning her first two wins over top-10 players (No. 10 Helena Suková and number-five Arantxa Sánchez Vicario). She entered the rankings in April, at No. 23. Capriati made her Grand Slam debut at the French Open. She went all the way to the semifinals, losing to eventual champion Monica Seles. She then reached the fourth round at Wimbledon, losing to Steffi Graf. Later in the year Capriati won her first career title in Puerto Rico, defeating Zina Garrison. After this victory Capriati entered the world's top 10. She qualified for the WTA Championships, narrowly losing to Graf in the first round in three sets. She finished her first season as a professional at world No. 8.

Throughout the season Capriati set multiple "youngest ever" records. She was the youngest player to reach a tour final, the youngest player to reach the semifinals at the French Open, the youngest seed ever at Wimbledon, and the youngest player to qualify for the season-ending championships. She was also the fourth-youngest player to win a WTA Tour title. She was named the WTA Newcomer of the Year for 1990.

In her second season as a touring pro, Capriati established herself as a consistent top-10 player. She won two singles titles during the summer hard court circuit, defeating world No. 1, Monica Seles, in a third set tie-breaker in final of San Diego, and Katerina Maleeva in straight sets in the final of Toronto. She also reached two Grand Slam semifinals, at Wimbledon and the US Open. At Wimbledon, the 15-year-old Capriati stunned nine-time champion Martina Navratilova, defeating her in the quarterfinals in straight sets. Capriati became the youngest person to ever reach the semifinal round of the tournament, losing to Sabatini. At the US Open, Capriati defeated Sabatini in the quarters but lost in the semis to eventual champion Seles in a third-set tiebreak after serving for the match twice. Capriati qualified for the year-end championships for the second time, reaching the quarterfinals. She ended the year at No. 6.

Capriati also won the only doubles title of her career at the Italian Open, partnering with Seles.

=== 1992–1993: Continued success, Olympic gold medal ===
Capriati's 1992 season was highlighted by her victory at the Summer Olympics. She defeated second-seeded Arantxa Sánchez Vicario in the semifinals and came from a set down to defeat top-seeded Steffi Graf in the gold-medal match. Capriati next defended her title in San Diego, defeating Conchita Martínez in the final, the only time that Capriati won back-to-back singles titles during her career. She reached the quarter-finals at the Australian Open (in her debut), at the French Open, and at Wimbledon, and then she lost in the third round at the US Open. In Miami, Capriati ended Monica Seles's streak of 21 consecutive finals by defeating her in the quarterfinals. Capriati finished the year ranked in the top 10 for the third straight year, at No. 7. She also became the youngest player to surpass $1 million in prize money (Martina Hingis later broke this record). Also in 1992, a Sega Genesis video game titled Jennifer Capriati Tennis was released by Renovation Products.

At her first tournament (Sydney 1993), Capriati defeated third-ranked Sabatini in the semifinals before defeating Anke Huber in the final. For the second straight year, she reached the quarterfinals at the first three majors of the year. She reached the final of the Rogers Cup in Montreal, losing to Steffi Graf. At the US Open, the seventh-seeded Capriati lost her opening match to former top 15-player Leila Meskhi, her first loss in the first round of any pro tournament. Following this loss, Capriati decided to take a break from tennis. She finished the year ranked ninth.

=== 1994–95: Break from tour ===
Capriati only played one match in 1994, losing in the first round of Philadelphia to Anke Huber. She fell off the rankings in June. She did not play at all in 1995.

=== 1996: Return ===
Capriati, unranked, played her first match in 15 months in Essen, where she reached the quarterfinals, losing to Jana Novotná in three sets. She reached her first final in more than three years at Chicago, defeating Monica Seles en route, before losing again to Novotná in three sets. Capriati also reached the quarters in the fall at the Zurich Open, defeating Sabatini in the opening round in what was the last singles match of Sabatini's career. Capriati competed in her first Grand Slam tournaments since 1993 at the French Open and the US Open, losing in the first round of both. Capriati re-appeared on the rankings in April at No. 103, and finished the year inside the top 25, at No. 24. She was named the WTA Comeback Player of the Year for 1996.

=== 1997–98: Descent in the rankings ===
In January 1997, Capriati reached the final in Sydney for the second time in her career, defeating world No. 9, Lindsay Davenport, en route to her only top-10 win of the year, losing to Martina Hingis in the final. She only reached the quarterfinals at one other tournament, Oklahoma City, where she lost to Davenport. Capriati finished the year at No. 66, losing her final six matches in 1997.

Capriati did not play the first half of 1998. By the spring, she was ranked below the top 200. She accepted a wildcard entry into the clay-court tournament in Hamburg, Germany, where she reached the quarterfinals, but then lost to Martina Hingis. Capriati was also a quarterfinalist in Palermo, Italy. In the first round at Wimbledon, Capriati won her first Grand Slam singles match in five years, before losing to Lori McNeil in the second round. Capriati finished 1998 ranked 101.

=== 1999–2000: Renewed ascent ===
1999 was Capriati's best season in several years. She won her first title in six years at Strasbourg, defeating ninth ranked Nathalie Tauziat in a quarterfinal for her first win over a top-10 player in two years. She defeated Russian Elena Likhovtseva in the final. She won her second title of the year at Quebec City, defeating American Chanda Rubin in the final. She also reached the round of 16 (octofinals) at both Roland Garros and US Open. She finished the year at No. 23.

At the 2000 Australian Open, Capriati reached her first Grand Slam semifinal in nine years before losing to eventual champion Lindsay Davenport in straight sets.

At the Miami Open, Capriati defeated world No. 6, Serena Williams, for her first win over a player ranked in the top six in four years en route to a quarterfinal finish. Shortly after, Capriati was sidelined with right Achilles tendonitis in April and an elbow injury in June.

Capriati had a strong fall season, winning her ninth career title at Luxembourg, defeating Magdalena Maleeva. She also finished runner up in Quebec City to Chanda Rubin and was a semifinalist in Zürich. These results propelled Capriati back into the top 20 for the first time since April 1994. She qualified for the season-ending championships for the first time in seven years. Her year-end ranking was 14, her highest in seven years. Capriati was also a member of the United States Fed Cup team, winning a singles and doubles rubber in the U.S.' victory over Spain in the final.

=== 2001: Grand Slam champion and world No. 1 ===
Capriati was seeded 12th at the Australian Open. She rallied from a set and a break down to defeat Monica Seles to reach the semis for the second consecutive year, wherein she beat world No. 2 Lindsay Davenport. In her first ever Grand Slam final, she defeated top seed and world No. 1 Martina Hingis in straight sets, to win her first Grand Slam singles title. She was the lowest seed to ever win the title, and also the first player since Tracy Austin in 1979 to defeat the top two ranked players in straight sets at a major. As a result of this triumph, Capriati re-entered the top 10 in the rankings at No. 7, the longest absence (nearly eight years) from the top 10 in WTA history.

Capriati then reached the finals of the Cellular Cup in Oklahoma City, losing to Seles. After electing not to participate in the Indian Wells Open, Capriati reached the final in Miami, losing to Venus Williams after having failed to convert on eight championship points.

Capriati then embarked on a remarkably successful clay court campaign. She won her second title of the year at the Family Circle Cup in Charleston, South Carolina, defeating Hingis in three sets in the final. She then lost in the final of Berlin to Amélie Mauresmo, also in three sets. Seeded fourth at the French Open, Capriati defeated top seed Hingis in the semifinals and the 12th seeded Kim Clijsters in the final to win her second consecutive Grand Slam title. Her 1–6, 6–4, 12–10 win over Clijsters had the longest-ever third set in a women's final in the French Open; four times in the match, Capriati was two points away from being defeated. She was only the fifth woman in history to win the Australian Open and the French Open consecutively.

At Wimbledon, Capriati rallied from 7–6, 5–3, 30–0 down in the quarterfinals to defeat Serena Williams. Capriati's 19-match Grand Slam win streak ended in the semis at the hands of eighth seeded Justine Henin. Capriati rebounded at the Rogers Cup in Toronto, making it to the final before losing to Serena Williams after saving match point in the second set. Capriati then lost in the semifinals of the US Open to Venus Williams. Despite the loss, Capriati accumulated the best Grand Slam record of 2001, and she was the only player to reach at least the semifinals of all four of the Grand Slam tournaments.

Despite playing very little in the fall, Capriati became ranked world No. 1 on October 15. She lost her opening match at the WTA Tour Championships to Maleeva. Capriati would have finished the year ranked No. 1 if she had reached the semifinals. Instead, she finished No. 2, behind Lindsay Davenport, with a 56–14 record. She was named the ITF World Champion, WTA Player of the Year, and Associated Press Female Athlete of the Year for 2001.

=== 2002: Third Grand Slam title ===
As a result of Davenport's withdrawal from the Australian Open due to an injury, Capriati was the top seed. She defeated the sixth-seeded Amélie Mauresmo and the fourth-seeded Kim Clijsters en route to her second consecutive final there, where she once again faced Martina Hingis. The match was played in very hot conditions, with the temperature exceeding 35 degrees Celsius. Capriati fought back from 6–4, 4–0 down and four championship points to eventually prevail 4–6, 7–6^{(9–7)}, 6–2. This was Capriati's third and final Grand Slam title.

In the spring, Capriati reached finals in Scottsdale and Miami losing to Serena Williams on both occasions. Capriati prepared for her French Open title defense by participating in events in Charleston, Berlin, and Rome, losing in the semifinals of all three. As the top seed at the French Open, Capriati reached the semifinals—before losing to the eventual champion Serena Williams in three sets. Capriati surrendered her No. 1 ranking to Venus Williams as a result of this loss. Capriati's streak of six consecutive Grand Slam semifinals was broken at Wimbledon, where she lost to Amélie Mauresmo in three sets in the quarterfinals. She also lost to Mauresmo in the finals of the Canadian Open, and in the quarterfinals of the US Open after having served for the match.

Capriati won only one match in the three European indoor events she played. She rebounded at the year-ending championships, reaching the semifinals for the first time, losing to Serena Williams. Capriati finished the year ranked third.

=== 2003: New Haven champion ===
A week after the 2002 WTA Championships, Capriati had eye surgery in order to remove pterygiums (sun spots) from both eyes. Recovery from the surgery hampered Capriati's off-season preparation.

In the opening round of the 2003 Australian Open Capriati lost to unseeded and unheralded Marlene Weingärtner. Capriati was the first Australian Open title-holder to lose in the first round. She withdrew from the Pan Pacific Open to further recover from her surgery.

Capriati rebounded by reaching at least semifinals of the next five tournaments she played. She lost to Lindsay Davenport in the semifinals of the Indian Wells tournament. She then reached the final of the Miami Open for the third consecutive year before losing to world No. 1, Serena Williams. Capriati lost in the octofinals of the French Open to unseeded Nadia Petrova. She reached the quarters of Wimbledon for the sixth time, losing to Serena Williams in three sets, her eighth consecutive loss to her compatriot.

Capriati then reached her second final of 2003 in Stanford, losing to Kim Clijsters in three sets. A pectoral strain forced Capriati to retire from her opening match in San Diego and pull out of Montreal. Capriati won her first title of 2003 in New Haven after Davenport retired in the final while trailing. This ended a 28-tournament title drought for Capriati, and was her first tour victory since she won the 2002 Australian Open. Seeded sixth at the US Open, Capriati reached the semifinal where she lost to second-seeded Justine Henin in a tight third-set tiebreak many experts believed she should have won. Capriati served for the match twice and was two points away from victory eleven times, but Henin prevailed in a three-hour marathon, despite Henin's serve being visibly affected by muscle cramps in her left leg throughout much of the last half hour of the match.

Capriati did not play again until the WTA Tour Championships when she lost in the semifinal to Justine Henin again, now the world No. 1.

=== 2004: Final full season ===
Injuries plagued Capriati's 2004 season. A back injury suffered during the 2003 WTA Tour Championships forced Capriati to withdraw from the 2004 Australian Open and the Pan Pacific Open in Tokyo. Capriati advanced beyond the quarterfinals just once in her first four events of the year in Doha, losing to Anastasia Myskina in the semifinals. Her back continued to be an issue, forcing her out of Indian Wells and Miami. Her ranking dropped to No. 10 as a result of her injuries.

Capriati produced her best results of the year during the European clay-court season. She reached the semis of Berlin, defeating world No. 5 Myskina in the quarterfinals for her first top-5 win of the season, before losing to Mauresmo in the semifinals. At the Italian Open, Capriati defeated top seed Serena Williams in the quarterfinals, her first win over the American since Wimbledon 2001. Capriati moved on to the final, where she lost to Mauresmo in a three-hour struggle. Seeded seventh at the French Open, Capriati went on to the semifinals, before losing to sixth seeded and eventual champion Myskina in straight sets.

At Wimbledon, Capriati reached the quarters for the fourth straight year, where she lost to Serena Williams in 45 minutes, the most lopsided result of their 17-match rivalry. A hamstring injury forced her to withdraw from Los Angeles and San Diego, but she reached the quarterfinals of both Montreal and New Haven. Seeded eighth at the US Open, Capriati defeated Williams in a controversial line call quarterfinal match by the chair umpire, Mariana Alves, to reach her fourth US Open semifinal. The call was shown repeatedly on TV via video replay to be clearly wrong, which had renewed calls and subsequently successful implementation of line-call technology such as MacCam and then Hawk-Eye. Capriati then lost to fifth seed Elena Dementieva in the last four in yet another, her third, tight US Open semifinal tiebreak, replicating the result in the tournament from the year before.

Capriati had reached the semifinals of the US Open four times in her career (1991, 2001, 2003 and 2004), losing to a different opponent each time. Three of those times (1991, 2003 and 2004), she had lost in tough third-set tiebreaks, and two of those three opponents (Seles in 1991, and Henin in 2003) had then gone on to win the final and US Open championships easily in straight sets thereafter.

Following the US Open, Capriati lost in the quarterfinals of Philadelphia to world No. 11, Vera Zvonareva, her worst loss since 1999 (where she won only one game against Graf in Miami). Capriati failed to qualify for the season-ending championships for the first time since 1999 and finished the year world No. 10.

== Playing style ==
Capriati was one of the first power players to emerge on the women's circuit in the early-to-mid-1990s, along with Monica Seles, Lindsay Davenport, and Mary Pierce. Her style of play was characterized by taking the ball early and on the rise, powerful ground-strokes, and an aggressive mindset on the return of service.

Capriati's game was built around her groundstrokes and movement. Her flat forehand, devastating when hit hard, was considered her biggest weapon, especially when she was stretched out wide. She also possessed a solid backhand. She was quick around the court, able to play defense as well as offense. Her biggest weakness was considered to be her serve. Her first serve was powerful but offset by a wandering ball-toss which often was thrown too far right, and her second serve was considered to be the most vulnerable part of her game. However, Capriati was known to counter her inconsistent serve with her exceptional return of serve.

== Equipment and endorsements ==
In the 1990s, she signed a reported $3 million contract with Diadora, and a $1 million contract with Prince tennis rackets. In the early 2000s, her tennis court apparel line was manufactured by Fila. She used a Prince Precision Retro 27 Midplus racket.

== Legacy and accolades ==
Capriati was inducted into the International Tennis Hall of Fame in 2012 at the age of just 36, and is generally considered one of the game's greatest players. A video game titled Jennifer Capriati Tennis was released for the Sega Genesis in 1992. In 2001, ESPN named Capriati one of the world's sexiest athletes. She was awarded with the Laureus World Sports Award for Comeback of the Year in 2001 and Laureus World Sports Award for Sportswoman of the Year in 2002.

== Post-tennis endeavors ==
In April 2009, the media announced that Capriati would appear on the television reality series The Superstars. The show, described as a revival of the 1970s series of the same name, premiered on June 23, 2009, in a co-ed format, with Capriati paired with singer and actor David Charvet, best known for his role as a lifeguard on the television show Baywatch. In the first episode of the show, they were one of the lower-performing teams and were sent into a run-off in an obstacle course race against basketball player Lisa Leslie and actor Dan Cortese. Capriati/Charvet won their race and avoided elimination. She withdrew from the contest after re-aggravating a previous injury. In 2026, she presented Australian Open women's singles winner Elena Rybakina with the Daphne Akhurst Memorial Cup in the Rod Laver Arena.

== Personal life ==
Capriati was born in Queens, New York City, the first of two children of Denise (née Deamicis; 1950) and Stefano Capriati (1935–2015), of Italian descent. She has one younger brother, Steven, with whom she teamed up for mixed doubles at Grand Slam level.

In 1993, at age 17, Capriati was charged with shoplifting a $15 ring from a mall kiosk, which she has described as accidental.

She was arrested on May 16, 1994, and charged with misdemeanor marijuana possession. She agreed to enter a drug counselling program. In 2010, she required treatment for a drug overdose. In 2013, Capriati was charged with battery and stalking after reportedly following and striking former boyfriend Ivan Brennan on Valentine's Day. The charges were later dropped. In 2014, the state attorney's office in Palm Beach County, Florida, announced that Capriati had completed 30 hours of community service and four hours of anger management counseling in connection with the incident.

As of 2026, Capriati is not married and has no children.

== Career statistics ==
=== Grand Slam singles performance timeline ===
Key
W	F	SF	QF	#R	RR	Q#	DNQ	A	NH

(W) winner; (F) finalist; (SF) semifinalist; (QF) quarterfinalist; (#R) rounds 4, 3, 2, 1; (RR) round-robin stage; (Q#) qualification round; (DNQ) did not qualify; (A) absent; (NH) not held; (SR) strike rate (events won / competed); (W–L) win–loss record.

Tournament	1990	1991	1992	1993	1994	1995	1996	1997	1998	1999	2000	2001	2002	2003	2004	SR	W–L	W%
Australian Open	A	A	QF	QF	A	A	A	1R	A	2R	SF	W	W	1R	A	2 / 8	28–6	82%
French Open	SF	4R	QF	QF	A	A	1R	A	A	4R	1R	W	SF	4R	SF	1 / 11	39–10	80%
Wimbledon	4R	SF	QF	QF	A	A	A	A	2R	2R	4R	SF	QF	QF	QF	0 / 11	38–11	78%
US Open	4R	SF	3R	1R	A	A	1R	1R	1R	4R	4R	SF	QF	SF	SF	0 / 13	35–13	73%
Win–loss	11–3	13–3	14–4	12–4	0–0	0–0	0–2	0–2	1–2	8–4	11–4	24–2	20–3	12–4	14–3	3 / 43	140–40	78%

=== Grand Slam tournament finals: 3 (3 titles) ===
Result	Year	Championship	Surface	Opponent	Score
Win	2001	Australian Open	Hard	(Switzerland) Martina Hingis	6–4, 6–3
Win	2001	French Open	Clay	(Belgium) Kim Clijsters	1–6, 6–4, 12–10
Win	2002	Australian Open (2)	Hard	(Switzerland) Martina Hingis	4–6, 7–6^{(9–7)}, 6–2

=== Olympic Games: 1 (gold medal) ===
Result	Year	Tournament	Surface	Opponent	Score
Gold	1992	Barcelona Olympics	Clay	(Germany) Steffi Graf	3–6, 6–3, 6–4

Sporting positions
Preceded by (Switzerland) Martina Hingis (United States) Lindsay Davenport (United States) Venus Williams (United States) Venus Williams	World No. 1 October 15, 2001 – November 4, 2001; January 14, 2002 – February 24, 2002; March 18, 2002 – April 21, 2002; May 20, 2002 – June 9, 2002	Succeeded by (United States) Lindsay Davenport (United States) Venus Williams (United States) Venus Williams (United States) Venus Williams
Awards and achievements
Preceded by (Spain) Conchita Martínez	WTA Newcomer of the Year; 1990	Succeeded by (Czech Republic) Andrea Strnadová
Preceded by (United States) Monica Seles	WTA Comeback Player of the Year; 1996	Succeeded by (France) Mary Pierce
Preceded by (United States) Venus Williams	WTA Player of the Year; 2001	Succeeded by (United States) Serena Williams
Preceded by (Switzerland) Martina Hingis	ITF World Champion; 2001	Succeeded by (United States) Serena Williams
Preceded by (United States) Marion Jones	Associated Press Female Athlete of the Year; 2001	Succeeded by (United States) Serena Williams
Preceded by Marion Jones	USOC Sportswoman of the Year; 2001	Succeeded by Sarah Hughes
Preceded by (Australia) Cathy Freeman	World Sportswoman of the Year; 2002	Succeeded by (United States) Serena Williams
