= Yasushi Nirasawa =

Japanese illustrator, character designer, and model maker

- 韮沢 靖
- Born: August 26, 1963; Tochio, Niigata, Japan
- Died: 2 February 2016 (aged 52)
- Occupation: Character designer

Yasushi Nirasawa (韮沢 靖, Nirasawa Yasushi; August 26, 1963 – February 2, 2016) was a Japanese illustrator, character designer, and model maker born in Tochio, Niigata. He is well known for character designs in the Kamen Rider entries Kamen Rider Blade, Kamen Rider Kabuto, and Kamen Rider Den-O and the creatures called "Horrors" in the GARO series.

Much of his early work as a designer and sculptor was featured in his Hobby Japan magazine column titled "Creature Core", which featured at least one of his sculptures in each monthly issue and was later collected as a hardcover book of the same name. In addition to original designs, this column also included sculptures based on characters from Kamen Rider, Inazuman, Guyver, Phantom of the Paradise, Hellraiser, Hellraiser III, and others. As part of his work for Hobby Japan, Nirasawa did character designs and cover art for the video games Beast Warriors and A-Rank Thunder Tanjouhen, and illustrations for Japanese RPGs, including illustrations of Michael Moorcock's Elric for the Japanese edition of Stormbringer.

In 2009, he was brought onto the productions of Kamen Rider Decade, the Cho-Den-O series, and Kamen Rider G in designing the Paradoxa Undead, the Alligator Imagin, the villains Goludora and Shilubara, and the Phylloxera Worm, respectively. He later provided the designs of the original villains of the Super Sentai Series's 2011 entry Kaizoku Sentai Gokaiger. His designs for the various Tokusatsu productions are published in UNDEAD GREEN BLOOD, GITAI, SAY YOUR WISH, and ZANGYACK WORKS LOG.

Nirasawa died on February 2, 2016 due to complications from chronic renal failure.

== Art style ==
Two common themes in Nirasawa's design are asymmetry, with characters having lopsided forms or multiple limbs; and anatomical imagery, with many designs having skeletal elements and/or extensive muscular detail. His nonhuman characters often originate from a combination of animal and human features, particularly including insectoid features. His human characters are often voluptuous women, either semi-nude or wearing armor.

== Works ==
- A-Rank Thunder Tanjouhen (Cover art)
- Beast Warriors (Cover art)
- Soulcalibur (Concept art)
- Hells Angels Manga (Creature desginer)
- BlowOut (Concept art)
- Space Truckers (Concept art)
- Vampire Hunter D: Bloodlust (Set design)
- Enemy Zero (Creature designer)
- Volfoss (Creature designer)
- Cyber Doll (Character designer)
- Final Fantasy: The Spirits Within (Phantom design)
- Guilstien
- Kamen Rider Blade (Undead design)
- Godzilla: Final Wars (Gigan and Xilien design)
- The Great Yokai War
- Golden Knight Garo series (Creature design)
- Kamen Rider Kabuto (Worm design)
- Kamen Rider Den-O (Imagin design)
- Kamen Rider Decade (Creature design)
- Kamen Rider G (Creature design)
- Kaizoku Sentai Gokaiger (Creature design)
- Iron Man: Rise of Technovore (Technovore design)
- Monster Hunter Frontier G (Genome and Divol armor design)
- Shin Megami Tensei IV (Creature design)
- Amon: The Darkside of The Devilman (Creature design)
