= Time Gal =

1985 interactive movie video game

- Japanese arcade flyer featuring protagonist Reika (top) and antagonist Luda (bottom)
- Developers: Taito; Toei Company
- Publishers: Taito; Toei Company
- Designers: Hidehiro Fujiwara; Hiroaki Sato; Toshiyuki Nishimura
- Programmer: Takashi Kuriyama
- Artists: Tetsuo Imazawa; Hiroshi Wagatsuma
- Composer: Yoshio Imamura
- Platform: Arcade: Amiga CD32, MSX, Sega CD, Macintosh, LaserActive, PlayStation, Sega Saturn, iOS, Android, Nintendo Switch, Windows
- Release: 1985: Arcade; JP: 1985 MSX; JP: 1986 Sega CD; JP: November 13, 1992; NA: May 1993; EU: September 1993 Macintosh; JP: April 22, 1994 LaserActive; JP: March 29, 1995 PlayStation; JP: July 5, 1996 Saturn; JP: January 17, 1997 iOS, Android; JP: April 5, 2017 Switch; JP: December 14, 2023 Windows; WW: April 10, 2025
- Genre: Interactive movie
- Mode: Single-player

Time Gal (Note: Japanese: タイムギャル, Hepburn: Taimu Gyaru) is a 1985 interactive movie LaserDisc game developed and published by Taito and Toei Company for Japanese arcades. It is an action game that uses full motion video (FMV) to display the on-screen action. The player must correctly choose the on-screen character's actions to progress the story. The pre-recorded animation for the game was produced by Toei Company.

The game is set in a fictional future where time travel is possible. The protagonist, Reika, travels to different time periods in search of a criminal, Luda, from her time. After successfully tracking down Luda, Reika prevents his plans to alter the past. Time Gal was inspired by the success of earlier LaserDisc video games that used pre-recorded animation, including Dragon's Lair (1983) and the previous Taito/Toei collaboration Ninja Hayate (1984), while Reika's character design bears similarities to the anime characters Lum and Yuri from Urusei Yatsura and Dirty Pair, respectively.

Time Gal was later ported to the Sega CD for a worldwide release, as well as home platforms in Japan, such as the LaserActive, MSX home computers, the PlayStation, and the Sega Saturn. The Sega CD version received a generally favorable reception from critics. Reika was noted for being an early female heroine and has appeared in other Taito-related games. A sequel was released decades later in 2023 titled Time Gal Re:Birth. (Note: タイムギャル リバース, Taimu Gyaru RiBaasu) An HD remaster of Time Gal was released in Japan at the same time and was released worldwide in 2025.

== Gameplay ==
Time Gal is an interactive movie game that uses pre-recorded animation rather than sprites to display the on-screen action. Gameplay is divided into levels, referred to as time periods. The game begins in 3001 AD with the theft of a time travel device. The thief, Luda, steals the device to take over the world by changing history. Reika, the protagonist also known as Time Gal, uses her own time travel device to pursue him; she travels to different time periods, such as 70,000,000 BC, 44 BC, 1588 AD, and 2010 AD, in search of Luda. Each time period is a scenario that presents a series of threats that must be avoided or confronted. Successfully navigating the sequences allows the player to progress to another period.

During specific game moments, Reika will activate her time stop ability. While time is briefly stopped, the player must select the correct response to Reika's situation in order to progress. Game scores are tracked at the top, and remaining player lives are at the bottom corner.

The player uses a joystick and button to input commands, though home versions use a game controller with a directional pad. As the game progresses, visual cues—highlighted portions of the background or foreground—will appear on the screen to help survive the dangers that occur throughout the stage; more difficult settings omit the visual cues. Depending on the location of the cue, the player will input one of four directions (up, down, left and right) or an attack (shoot the target with a laser gun). Inputting the correct command will either avoid or neutralize the threats and progress the game, whereas incorrect choices result in the character's death. Reika dying too many times results in a game over. Specific moments in the game involve Reika stopping time. During these moments, players are presented with a list of three options and have seven seconds to choose the one which will save the character.

== Development ==
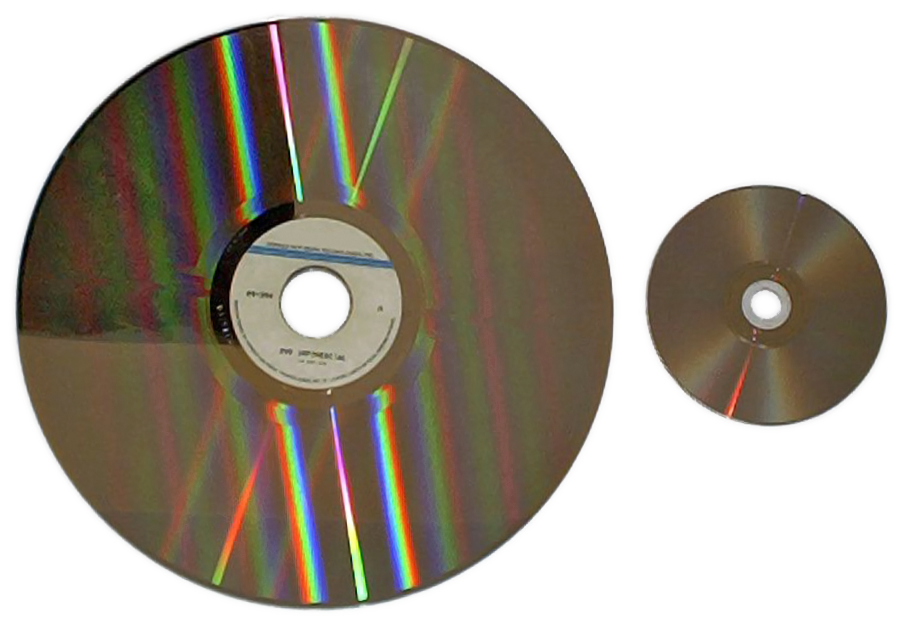
The arcade game's content is played from a LaserDisc (left), an early form of optical disc storage. A DVD (right) is shown for size comparison.

Taito developed Time Gal for arcades. The game uses LaserDisc technology to stream pre-recorded animation, which was produced by Japanese studio Toei Animation. Tetsuo Imazawa directed the animation. Japanese MSX Magazine staff reported that the game's animation required approximately six times more animation cels per minute that what is commonly used for traditional television anime. The arcade cabinet features raster graphics on a CRT monitor and amplified monaural sound.

The head of Taito's sound department, Yoshio Imamura, supervised the audio. Similar to Taito's previous LaserDisc games, Toei Animation also composed the music and sound effects; Imamura would provide feedback to Toei and approve the final audio. When it was time to review the material, Imamura along with Hisayoshi Ogura and other Taito sound staff visited the Toei composer's studio. However, the audio was unfinished as the Toei team was short-staffed. To complete the project, Imamura and his team assisted with playing the music, staying at the studio until it was finished later that night.

The main protagonist is voiced by Japanese singer and voice actress Yuriko Yamamoto. A script was not prepared for the voice recording, and Yamamoto ad-libed the lines by looking at scenes from the game. Mike Toole and Jeff Kapalka noted similarities between Reika's visual character design and Lum from Urusei Yatsura as well as Yuri from Dirty Pair; they speculated that the anime characters provided inspiration for Reika.

== Release and ports ==
Taito released Time Gal exclusively in Japanese arcades in 1985. Several factors prevented an overseas release: a decline in the popularity of LaserDisc arcade games in the mid-80s, the expensive price of LaserDisc technology, and the difficulty to translate. Following its arcade release, Time Gal has been ported to different home formats. It was first released exclusively in Japan by Nippon Victor on the Video High Density format along with a Compact Cassette for MSX home computers in the summer of 1986. The MSX version later became an expensive collector's item. In 2019, Japanese gaming store BEEP Akihabara sold a slightly-damaged complete copy for ¥178,000 (US$1,632.88).

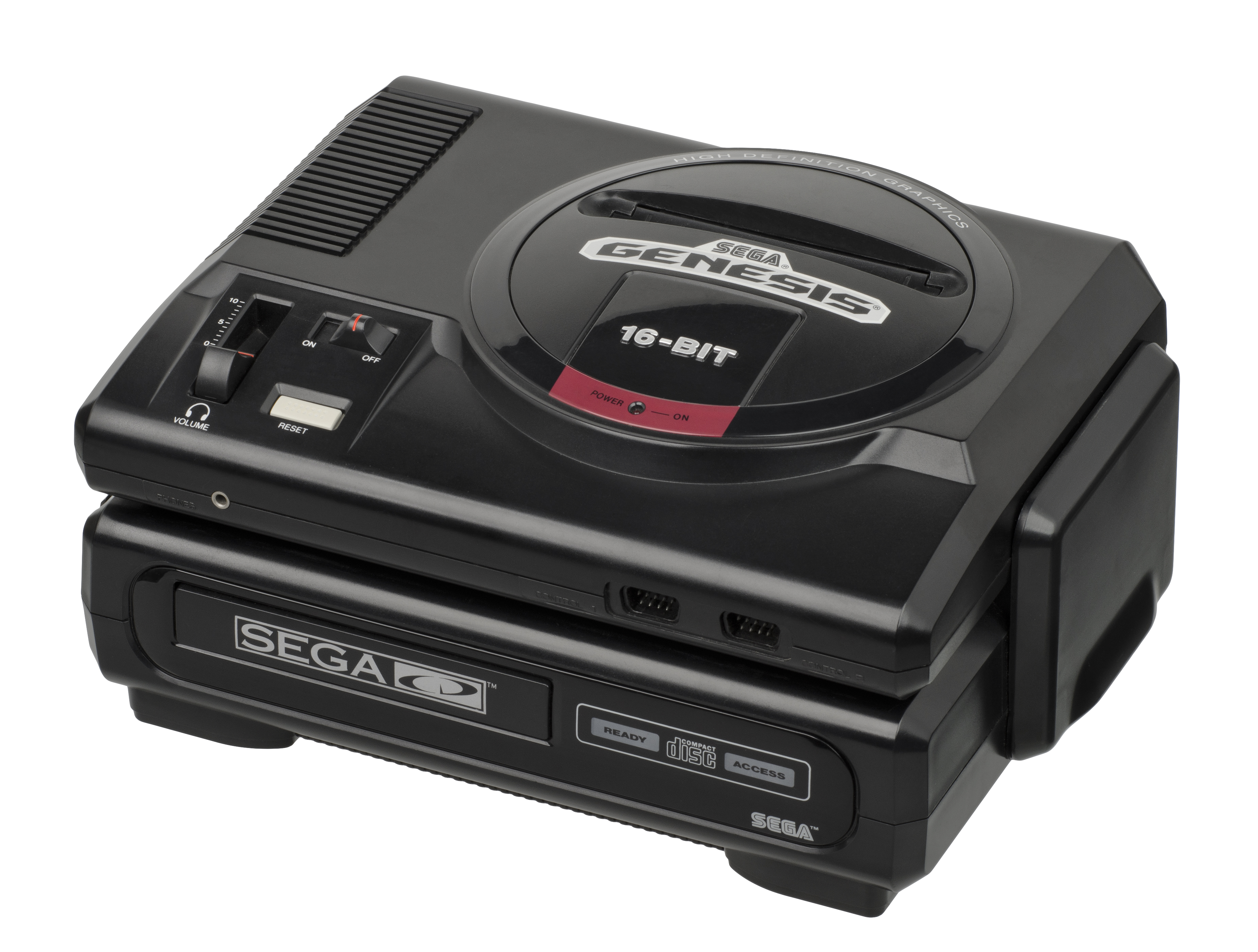
Time Gal remained exclusive to Japan until Wolf Team's conversion to the Sega CD (pictured), known as the Mega-CD outside North America. The port gained widespread attention, which led to releases in other territories.

The release of the Sega CD console in 1991 spawned numerous games that took advantage of the CD technology to introduce interactive FMVs. Among the new titles, Time Gal was one of several older LaserDisc-based games that were ported to the system. Renovation Products acquired the rights to publish Time Gal on the Sega CD, with Wolf Team handling development. This port uses a smaller color palette than the original arcade, includes a video gallery that requires passwords to view each level's animation sequences, and features new opening and ending themes composed by Shinji Tamura and Motoi Sakuraba, respectively. Yuriko Yamamoto returned to sing the opening song, 時空をこえて (Jikuu wo Koete, lit. 'Across time and space'), with lyrics by Tomoko Nakajima.

American press coverage of the Japanese release prompted video game enthusiasts to contact Renovations about a Western release. The number of requests persuaded the company's president, Hide Irie, to announce a release in the United States. In addition to being dubbed in English, a few death scenes in the US version were censored. Renovation Products released Time Gal, along with similar games, as part of its "Action-Reaction" series. After the North American release, the company submitted a trademark request for the game's title with the United States Patent and Trademark Office on July 9, 1993.

A Macintosh version was released in Japan on April 22, 1994. A Mega-LD version was released on March 25, 1995, in Japan on the Pioneer LaserActive, which requires the Sega Mega-LD module to play Mega-LD games as well as Sega-CD ones. The LaserActive version is the rarest home release of Time Gal, as well as one of the most expensive on the system among collectors. Time Gal was ported to the PlayStation in 1996 as a compilation with Ninja Hayate, another LaserDisc arcade game developed by Taito. This release lacks the Sega CD version's additional content but features a more accurate reproduction of the animation. The compilation was also released on the Sega Saturn the following year. Ecseco Development handled the conversion from the original arcade format.

Decades later, Taito released the game on newer platforms. On April 1, 2017, Taito Classics announced plans to release several of its older games onto mobile devices, with Time Gal being its first release. The game was later released in Japan on April 5, 2017. A navigational function and a gallery of the game's original concept art are available for purchase as microtransactions. Time Gal is included in the Taito LD Game Collection on the Nintendo Switch. The collection was released on December 14, 2023, and includes an HD remaster of the game. Following the release, Taito submitted a trademark request for Time Gal with the Japan Patent Office on January 16, 2024. On April 10, 2025, the remaster received a standalone release on Nintendo Switch, in Japan only, and was also released on Windows via Steam worldwide.

== Reception ==
GamePro magazine staff noted that "Japanese players ate it up" when it first released in Japanese arcades. However, GameSetWatch's Todd Ciolek believed it was released too late in the life of LaserDisc games, and that players "were getting tired" of the genre's gameplay. He further commented that, despite its gameplay, it was unique and charming. Larry Bundy Jr. compared the gameplay to Dragon's Lair and Space Ace, noting that the only difference is that Time Gal's death sequences depicts Reika in fan service scenes. A writer for GamePro referred to the arcade game as a "lost, LaserDisc treasure" and called the death sequences "hilarious", feeling that they reduced the tediousness of dying.

Reception (Sega CD)

Aggregate score
Aggregator	Score
GameRankings	80%

Review scores
Publication	Score
AllGame	3.5/5
Electronic Gaming Monthly	8/10, 8/10, 6/10, 8/10 (Note: At the time, Electronic Gaming Monthly featured four review scores. Each individual score ranges from 0 to 10.)
Famitsu	6/10, 4/10, 6/10, 4/10 (Note: Weekly Famitsu magazine's four reviewers each provided an individual score. Individual scores range from 0 to 10.)
GameFan	177/200
GamePro	5/5
VideoGames & Computer Entertainment	7/10
Sega Pro	86%

Award
Publication	Award
Mega	5th Top CD Game

The Sega CD release received far more attention than the arcade version. Weekly Famitsu magazine's four reviewers—Hirokazu Hamamura, George Nakaji, Miki Watanabe, and TACOX—were split in their separate reviews. While he noted that the simple gameplay required no strategy, only fast reflexes and memory, Hamamura conceded that he continued playing to see how the story progressed. He included it his picks of the week, commenting that the title could be the future of CD games. Conversely, Nakaji and TACOX described the gameplay as only reflex training and following instructions; however, TACOX did note that he enjoyed playing Time Gal at times. He further stated that fans of the genre would enjoy the game. Both Nakaji and Watanabe called the visuals "old-fashioned", which Watanabe attributed to the age of the original arcade game. Prior to coming to North America, staff for GamePro and Electronic Gaming Monthly magazines were enthusiastic about the Sega CD release. Electronic Gaming Monthly writers praised the use of CD technology and felt it would be followed by titles with similar gameplay. Writing for Sega Pro, Sam Hickman lauded Time Gal's visuals, praising the variety of characters, backgrounds, and settings. He called the graphics "outstanding" and the animation a "complete joy". Hickman also praised the audio and called the theme "bubbly and catchy". He summarized his review by calling the game one of the best CD games available at the time. MEGA magazine ranked the Sega CD version the number five CD game, commenting that though it lacked difficulty, it was a good showcase of the system.

Critics praised Time Gal's visuals. GameFan magazine, in praising Wolf Team's port of the game, complimented the Sega CD version's graphics and short load times. GamePro said the animation is "great, with bright, vivid colors, and fast-paced, exciting movement" and praised the "funny gameplay" and "nonstop action". Chris Bieniek of VideoGames & Computer Entertainment criticized the story as "nonsensical" and said that while the unlockable video gallery is a nice feature, it effectively eliminates any replay value, which compounds the easiness of the game to give it very low longevity. He nonetheless recommended Time Gal, based chiefly on the gameplay: "Though you never really feel like you're in control of Time Gal's movements, the zany action has an undeniable appeal that takes up a lot of the slack." Shawn Sackenheim of AllGame complimented the animation, calling it "high quality", but criticized the Sega CD graphics, calling them "downgraded". He commented that, though Time Gal offered a good thrill, it lacked replay value. Ciolek echoed similar statements, saying it is more enjoyable to watch than to play. He further commented that the game is frustrating and rigid when compared to more contemporary standards. Electronic Gaming Monthly's group of reviewers praised the Sega CD version's graphics quality. Three of the four reviewers lauded the gameplay, specifically the challenge and format. The other reviewer stated he didn't care for this type of game, referring to the gameplay as "nothing more than memorizing".

== Legacy ==
IGN's Levi Buchanan listed interactive movie games like Time Gal as one of the reasons behind the Sega CD's commercial failure, citing them as a waste of the system's capabilities. In describing the cinematic gameplay in the 2009 action game Ninja Blade, producer Masanori Takeuchi attributed the quick time event game mechanic featured in his title to LaserDisc games like Dragon's Lair and Time Gal.

Todd Ciolek referred to the protagonist as one of the first human heroines in the industry. He further added that Reika was an appealing lead character that Taito could have easily turned into a mascot and featured in other games and media; at the time, Reika temporarily became a mascot only for Taito's arcades in Japan. Bundy also noted that Reika was an early female video game protagonist, predating Samus Aran. He commented, however, that her original appearance did not have much impact until Time Gal gained mainstream recognition on the Sega CD. Reika was later included in Alfa System's shoot 'em up Castle of Shikigami III—Taito published the arcade version in Japan. In the game, Reika features attacks and a personality similar to her original debut as well as an updated visual design. Reika also appeared in the 2011 Elevator Action remake Elevator Action Deluxe via downloadable content.

Taito released a sequel titled Time Gal Re:Birthas downloadable content for the 2023 Taito LD Game Collection on Nintendo Switch. It follows a new character named Luna, who is sent on a mission to stop the villain Luda while Reika also searches for Luda. The company later published Re:Birth as a stand alone game in 2025.

== See also ==
- Cobra Command – 1984 LaserDisc arcade game that Wolf Team ported to the Sega CD
- Road Blaster – 1985 LaserDisc arcade game with animation by Toei that Wolf Team ported to the Sega CD
