= Final Zone II =

1990 video game

- North American box art
- Developer: Wolf Team
- Publishers: JP: Telenet Japan; NA: NEC
- Platform: TurboGrafx-CD
- Release: JP: March 23, 1990; NA: November 1990
- Genre: Run and gun
- Mode: Single-player

Final Zone II is a run and gun video game created by Wolf Team and published by Telenet Japan for the TurboGrafx-16 on CD-ROM in Japan on March 23, 1990. It was later ported to the TurboGrafx-16 CD add-on in North America later that year by NEC. It is the official sequel to Final Zone.

== Gameplay ==
In this game, the player takes control of one of five characters in a typical overhead run and gun style game. Unlike the original game, the player can shoot in 8 directions, and enemies have fixed starting positions and a fixed number of enemies in each part of the level. The game is designed for the player to shoot off-center from the player sprite, in order to mimic a more realistic shooting style. Levels in the game are either character paced or have vehicles which automatically scrolls across the screen, creating a vertically scrolling shooter level.

The five characters that can be played as during the game each have slightly different weapons and advantages. This makes the strategy needed for each stage vary. Throughout the levels, players can pick up power ups such as special weapon ammunition, additional health, and extending the health bar.

== Reception ==
Reception

Review score
Publication	Score
Electronic Gaming Monthly	6/10, 6/10, 6/10, 8/10

Electronic Gaming Monthly reviewers described the game's difficulty "average" and complaining about its short length but largely praising the graphics, music, and voice work. GamePro called the gunplay "intense, and rough as anything around" and characterized the gameplay as "fairly straightforward action", rating the game's difficulty as exceptionally high. Italian magazine Video Giochi heavily praised the graphics and music but criticized the high difficulty and lack of a save feature. Tilt called the game quite difficult, but stated that this is "partly offset by the flexibility and precision of the controls." Comparing it to the TurboGrafx-CD game Red Alert, they called Final Zone II "much less successful".

== See also ==
- List of TurboGrafx-16 games
