= Jennifer Capriati Tennis =

1992 video game

- North American cover art
- Developer: System Sacom
- Publishers: JP: Telenet Japan; NA: Renovation Products; PAL: Sega
- Platform: Sega Genesis
- Release: JP: June 12, 1992; NA: September 1992; PAL: 1992
- Genre: Sports
- Modes: Single-player, multiplayer

Jennifer Capriati Tennis (known as GrandSlam: The Tennis Tournament '92 in Japan and in PAL regions as GrandSlam: The Tennis Tournament) is a Sega Genesis video game developed by System Sacom and released in 1992. The game is named after Jennifer Capriati, one of the world's top-ranked female tennis players at the WTA Tour during the time of the game's release.

== Gameplay ==
A gamer can create their own player by choosing their race, gender, and tennis wear color. In addition to this, the game can be played by either one or two players. There can be doubles and singles matches, in addition to numerous tournaments. Tournaments take place in various locations around the world, including Florida, London, Paris, and Sydney.
