= El Viento =

1991 video game

- Cover art for the Japanese version
- Developer: Wolf Team
- Publishers: JP: Wolf Team; NA: Renovation Products
- Composer: Motoi Sakuraba
- Platform: Genesis
- Release: JP: September 20, 1991; NA: November 1991
- Genre: Platform
- Mode: Single-player

El Viento (エル・ヴィエント, Eru Viento; from Spanish meaning "The Wind") is a 1991 platform game developed and published by Wolf Team for the Sega Genesis. It is the first in a trilogy of games, which includes Earnest Evans and Annet Returns, despite taking place after the former.

== Gameplay ==
El Viento is a platform game. The player has access to an endless supply of bladed boomerangs and eventually up to five spell attacks. Each level ends in a fight against a stage boss.

== Plot ==
The game shares the same fictional universe with Earnest Evans, and happens several years later. It also features many references to H. P. Lovecraft's Cthulhu Mythos. The game takes place in New York City during the late 1920s, when cult leader Henry, the gangster Al Capone (Vincente DeMarcoto in the American localization), and a sorceress named Restiana plot to awaken the ancient and malevolent god Hastur. There are some people that have descended from Hastur's ancient bloodline, one of which is the young Peruvian sorceress, Annet Myer. With some assistance from Earnest Evans, Annet attempts to stop the cult from resurrecting Hastur using the very spells of this bloodline.

== Reception ==
Reception

Review scores
Publication	Score
ACE	515/1000
AllGame	3.5/5
Beep! MegaDrive	6.5/10
Electronic Gaming Monthly	8/10, 8/10, 7/10, 8/10
Famitsu	6/10, 5/10, 7/10, 4/10
Games-X	3/5
Mean Machines Sega	80%
Console XS	90/100
Entertainment Weekly	D-
Hippon Super!	6/10
Mega Play	8/10, 9/10, 9/10, 9/10
MegaTech	80%
Sega Pro	89/100

El Viento received scores of 20.052/30 and 7.3843/10 in public polls taken by Mega Drive Fan and the Japanese Sega Saturn Magazine respectively. The Japanese publication Micom BASIC Magazine ranked the game eleventh in popularity in its January 1992 issue. It also received a mixed reception from critics. Sega Pro's Damian Butt stated that "With super fast graphics and brutal gameplay, El Viento will take your breath away". MegaTech called it "A tough 'n' challenging platform which doesn't look particularly hot, but is surprisingly addictive and keeps you playing for ages". Entertainment Weekly opined that "only the game's amusing historical anachronisms-like denim-clad blond bikers wielding scimitars-save it from rating as a total failure".

Hardcore Gaming 101's Kurt Kalata said that ""overall, it's a bit of a sloppy game, with haphazard action and iffy level design, but the fast pace and overall craziness make this worth looking into, especially since it's one of Wolf Team's better titles".
