= Psychic Storm =

1992 video game

- The TurboGrafx box art
- Developer: Alfa System
- Publisher: Shin-Nihon Laser Soft
- Platforms: TurboGrafx-16, Nintendo Switch
- Genre: Shoot 'em up

Psychic Storm (Note: Japanese: サイキックストーム, Hepburn: Saikikku Sutōmu) is a 1992 vertically scrolling shooter video game released by Laser Soft for the NEC PC Engine Super CD-ROM².

It was included in the 2023 Telenet Shooting Collection for the Nintendo Switch. It was also released on the Nintendo eShop as a stand-alone title.

At the time of its original release, the Famitsu review staff gave the game average ratings, while highlighting the creature-like appearance of enemy ships. TurboPlay considered the game easy, but praised its presentation and co-op mode.
