= Cosmic Fantasy =

1990–1994 role-playing video game series

Cosmic Fantasy (コズミック・ファンタジー, Kozumikku Fantajī) is a series of role-playing video games created by manga artist Kazuhiro Ochi, published by Telenet and developed by subsidiary LaserSoft from 1990 to 1994. It consists of four games (the last one being split in two installments) for the PC Engine CD console. The first two games were re-released as Cosmic Fantasy Stories, an upgraded compilation for the Sega CD developed by Riot. The series has themes of science fiction, adventure, raunchy comedy, and light erotica. It is notable as among the earlier RPGs to feature extended anime-style cutscenes and voice acting. Cosmic Fantasy 2 was the only game in the series to be released in English, localized and published by Working Designs.

Limited Run Games released Cosmic Fantasy Collection in North America on 25 January 2024. It features new English translations for the first two games. Both of the games only have Japanese voice acting with English subtitles.

Limited Run Games released Cosmic Fantasy Collection 2 in North America on 18 February 2025. It features new English translations for the last three games. All of the games only have Japanese voice acting with English subtitles.

== Plot ==
Yuu the leader of an interstellar crime force, is fighting space pirates alongside his crew consisting of Saya, tanuki motorcycle robot Momo, and the feline Nyan. This time against Berga, who has a love interest in Yuu, which he then declines, forcing Berga to go berserk.

== Characters ==
Yuu: Minami Takayama

Saya: Yumi Takada

Berga: Rei Sakuma

Nyan: Sanae Miyuki

Tokida Director: Tesshō Genda

Monmo: Yumi Takada

== Titles ==
- Cosmic Fantasy: Bōken Shōnen Yū (1990, PC Engine CD)
- Cosmic Fantasy 2 (1991, PC Engine, TurboGrafx CD)
- Cosmic Fantasy Stories (1992, Sega CD)
- Cosmic Fantasy 3: Bōken Shōnen Rei (1992, PC Engine CD)
- Cosmic Fantasy Visual Collection (1993, PC Engine CD)
- Cosmic Fantasy 4: Ginga Shōnen Densetsu - Totsunyū-hen (1994, PC Engine CD)
- Cosmic Fantasy 4: Ginga Shōnen Densetsu - Gekitō-hen (1994, PC Engine CD)
- Cosmic Fantasy Collection (2022, Nintendo Switch)
- Cosmic Fantasy Collection 2 (2023, Nintendo Switch)

== Other media ==
- Cosmic Fantasy: Galaxy Cougar's Trap
- VHS cover

コズミック・ファンタジー 銀河女豹の罠 (Kozumikku Fantajī Ginga Mehyō no Wana)
- Original video animation
- Directed by: Kazuhiro Ochi
- Produced by: Michio Yokoo
- Written by: Kazuhiro Ochi
- Music by: Tatsuya Murayama
- Studio: Jitensha; Tokuma Shoten
- Released: 25 August 1994
- Runtime: 42 minutes

Cosmic Fantasy: Galaxy Cougar's Trap (コズミック・ファンタジー 銀河女豹の罠, Kozumikku Fantajī Ginga Mehyō no Wana) is an anime OVA, based on the series. It was released in 1994, on VHS and LaserDisc, shortly before the release of the game Cosmic Fantasy 4.
