= Traysia =

1992 role-playing video game

- North American cover art by Mick McGinty
- Developer: Riot
- Publishers: JP: Riot; NA: Renovation Products
- Director: Eiji Kikuchi
- Programmer: Masayasu Yamamoto
- Artist: Mahiro Maeda
- Writers: Eiji Utsu; Mitsuya Saitō; Mutsumi Sasaki
- Composer: Shinobu Ogawa
- Platform: Sega Mega Drive/Genesis
- Release: JP: February 14, 1992; NA: April 1992
- Genre: Role-playing
- Mode: Single-player

Traysia (known as Minato no Traysia in Japan) is a traditional role-playing video game that was released in 1992 for the Sega Genesis. The player controls a young man named Roy who is dropped off in the Kingdom of Salon by his uncle, a traveling merchant, and is joined by three other characters to begin a journey that leads them against a shadowy group of wizards from the north.

== Gameplay ==
A battle in Traysia

The game is a party-based RPG with randomly encountered enemies fought on a grid-like battlefield, with the player's characters positioned in the lower part while the enemies are in the upper part of the screen. Each characters requires more than one turn to get close enough to attack the opponent, otherwise they will just move towards them. Magic spells are cast in one of four directions and must be on the same line as an enemy in order to cause damage. The game ends when the main character's hit points reaches zero, regardless of the status of the rest of the party.

== Synopsis ==
Raised in the port town of Johanna, Roy is a young man who has grown up dreaming of exploring faraway lands, getting his opportunity to do by riding with his uncle’s traveling caravan. Before leaving, Roy’s sweetheart Traysia gives him her pendant as a memento and promises to wait for his return.

Roy is dropped off in the kingdom of Salon and overhears the Lord of the Town’s speech on merchants and travelers being attacked in an ancient forest in the north. To help eliminate the threat, Roy joins a hunting party composed of Banegie, a shrouded knight concealing her identity as a former princess; Magellan, an outcast swordsman with no sense of justice; and Floyd, a powerful wizard who serves the Lord. While exploring the forest cave, Floyd leads them into a trap and divulges that the Lord’s intent is to control the kingdom by disposing of all the strongest hunters and framing Roy’s party for their murders. When Floyd escapes, they return to town and are joined by Bellenue, a sorceress from the north who elaborates on Floyd’s history and his pattern of manipulating rulers for personal gain. The party manages to free the kingdom by defeating the Lord though Floyd flees in the aftermath. Roy and his companions agree to stay together and leave the area in pursuit of the wizard.

In the subsequent chapters, the party helps prevent a war between the kingdoms of Iyuve and Lyude by brokering a marriage between their prince and princess and defeating the wizards responsible for manipulating the sides against one another. Deep in the network of towns embodying the empire of Sandora, they foil the plans of another group of wizards who reveal their connection to Floyd. Roy and his group journey north and learn that the wizards have been experimenting with dark magic causing people to lose their memories. When the Queen of the Witches is vanquished and the memory spell over the region is broken, Floyd concedes defeat but slips away once again. While reflecting on their victory, Banegie proposes visiting Johanna so she can see Roy's hometown and meet Traysia.

During the final chapter, Roy and his companions return to Johanna to find it under martial law by a mysterious new leader, Roy’s family home burned down and Traysia being held captive along with other townsfolk. They discover that a month prior, a wizard arrived by boat and took control of the region by enthralling the authority; the party concludes that it is Floyd. Using a secret passage in the castle's dungeon, Roy rescues Traysia and the hostages but Banegie gets herself captured to ensure everyone’s escape. Upon returning to free her, Floyd reveals himself and states that he decided to take over Roy's hometown as an act of revenge. Following their final confrontation, a defeated Floyd attempts to kill Roy by detonating himself, but Banegie shields him from the blast. Suffering mortal wounds, Banegie confesses her love for Roy and urges him to marry Traysia as her final request.

In the epilogue, Roy marries Traysia and retires from adventuring to open a tavern and a supply store for adventurers, spending his days regaling children with stories from his journey. After closing up shop for the day, Roy and Traysia take a walk and look upon Banegie’s gravestone as the story ends.

== Development and release ==
Traysia was first released in Japan by Telenet Japan on February 14, 1992, through their development and publishing division Riot. Telenet also released the game in April 1992 through its North American subsidiary Renovation Products. The Western cover was illustrated by Mick McGinty.

== Reception ==
Reception

Review scores
Publication	Score
Beep! MegaDrive	5.25/10
Famitsu	13/40
RPGamer	1.5/5
Video Games (DE)	43%
Gamers	3
Mega	33%
Play Time	51%
Power Play	39%
Sega Pro	17%

Traysia received generally unfavorable reviews. The game received scores of 18.0 out of 30 and 4.7538 out of 10 in public polls taken by Mega Drive Fan and the Japanese Sega Saturn Magazine respectively. Mega Play's four reviewers praised its lengthy quest, distinctive plot, and music, but criticized the mediocre graphics and repetitive gameplay. Gamers' Heinrich Lenhardt faulted the game's poor magic system, lackluster audiovisual department, and cumbersome controls. Play Time's Alexander Geltenpoth found the game's story to be boring and the overall audiovisual presentation underdeveloped, while Power Play's Volker Weitz faulted its outdated combat and magic systems.

Video Games' Michael Hengst viewed Traysia unfavorably compared to other titles in the genre such as Shining in the Darkness and Phantasy Star, criticizing the dated graphics, sluggish interface and combat system. Sega Pro stated that the game offered very little, faulting the unacceptable visuals and lacking gameplay. Mega's Jon Smith wrote that it "should be consigned to the scrapheap of obscurity, never again to sully a Mega Drive's sacred cartridge slot". RPGamer's Mike Moehnke commended the game's low rate of random encounters and catchy soundtrack by Shinobu Ogawa, but criticized its plot, clunky interface, slow battles, and graphics due to the small size of most objects and color scheme.
