= Cosmic Fantasy 2 =

1991 video game

- North American cover art
- Developer: Nippon Telenet
- Publishers: JP: Nippon Telenet; NA: Working Designs
- Series: Cosmic Fantasy
- Platform: TurboGrafx-CD
- Release: JP: April 5, 1991; NA: June 1992
- Genre: Role-playing
- Mode: Single-player

Cosmic Fantasy 2, known in Japan as Cosmic Fantasy 2: Bōken Shōnen Ban (コズミック・ファンタジー2 冒険少年バン) is a role-playing video game developed and published by Nippon Telenet in Japan in 1991, and localized and published by Working Designs in North America in 1992, for the TurboGrafx-CD (PC Engine CD-ROM²) video game console. It is the second game in the Cosmic Fantasy series and was the only one released outside Japan until 2024.

== Gameplay ==
The gameplay is dungeon crawling typical of its era, with an overhead viewpoint and turn-based battles. The one distinguishing feature is in the predictability of the battles: all of the enemies, even the bosses, are unable to use spells, items, or special moves of any sort, and are restricted to performing a normal attack each turn. Furthermore, neither enemies nor player characters can miss with attacks, and there are no critical hits aside from certain weapons which unleash spell attacks on random turns. This leaves the enemies' choice of target for each of their attacks as the one element of uncertainty in battles.

== Plot ==
Van is a 16-year-old boy who lives on Clan Island, an island on the planet Idea. One day, while slacking off in some fields outside of his village, Van discovers an explosion in a nearby village. He soon finds out from some villagers that the village was under attack by an evil wizard named Wizda, one of Galam's henchman, who is looking for the princess of Idea. Van also finds out that the princess can be recognized through her royal pendant, and that princess is Laura, Van's sweetheart. After hearing the news, Van rushes back to his village and discovers that his village has been under attack as well. He soon finds out from Abel, an old resident of Clan Island, that Galam's forces have kidnapped Laura. As he tries to save Laura, Van finds that he is powerless against the fury of Wizda, and can only watch, bloody and bruised, as the evil wizard takes Laura away.

Abel later rescues Van, though, telling him to calm down for what he just witnessed. Van soon discovers that Laura possesses magical powers that may grant immortality to the one who marries her, and these powers can be unlocked on her 17th birthday. Once a man takes her a marriage, the power is released to him. That is exactly what the evil wizard Galam has in mind. Van sets off to rescue Laura, on a quest that involves intergalactic journeys and travel through time. Upon his arrival, he finds Darva, an old magician who knows the secret of Galam's powers because of his past years of him experimenting his black magic. Darva then tells Van that Galam did not only capture Laura, he wanted to take over the entire planet of Idea. After hearing the tragic news, Van rushes over to Galam's castle and sees him with Laura next to him, but he finds out that Laura is Galam's wife and suddenly bursts in anger for Galam's love connection with her. Being angered by his heart, Van tries to defeat Galam, but he is too weak due to Galam's black magic spells.

After getting beaten to a pulp, Galam warps Van into 20 years into the future where he will become the absolute ruler of Idea. Meanwhile, 20 years later, Babbette, a young Cosmic Hunter cadet, who is out with her ship, Little Fox, and her computer, Robert, decides to investigate on Planet Idea in search of a missing alien named Pico, a cat-like being, who was shot down and kidnapped by Cosmic Pirates in search for his father. Robert convinces her not to do that because it may be illegal for her to investigate an emergency distress signal on Idea, but Babbette is not happy by the way she feels and decides to disobey his orders and find Pico herself. Babbette finds Pico in a dungeon castle and realizes that Nova was the one who kidnapped Pico. After rescuing him, Babbette and Pico decide to flee away from the scene and get back to Pico's home.

Babette gets kidnapped by Major Payne after her ship, Little Fox, has been attacked by Cosmic Pirates. Van later saves Pico from a group of guards, and the two of them decide to team up and save Babette from Major Payne. Babette later gives Van a new armor suit after he and Pico rescued her from Major Payne and recruits him to join the team. As soon the trio team up, Van, Babette, and Pico all set out together to find Laura and save her from Galam. Upon their arrival, they find themselves under attack by a space pirate named Vega. Despite having nowhere left to hide, Cobra, a Cosmic Hunter, clashes with Vega and rescue them from his new powerful weapon. Cobra later takes them to his ship his crewmates, Nayan, Sayo, and Marley.

Pico finds his father, Nayan, and decides to stay on Cobra's ship until Van and his friends have defeated Galam. After countless battles of endless adventures, Van finally sees Laura in an old house, where she lives with a servant named Mary on her side. He tells Laura that he needs to defeat Galam and bring her back to Clan Island, where they have been living for a long time. Van decides to recruit Cobra, Sayo, and Babette to team up and go after Galam in order for them to bring Laura back to Clan Island.

After defeating Galam, Robert arrives just in time and destroys Galam's ship, just before it was about to leave. After that, Van and his friends discover that Laura is not at her house anymore and Mary is the only one here. Mary gives Van a note telling him that Laura was in serious condition and passed away last week. Van is surprised when he hears the news, but finds out that their love connection will never break apart again. Peace is restored and Van, Babette, and Pico have officially become true Cosmic Hunter members along with Cobra, Sayo, Nayan, and Marley, and they all fly away together where their adventures continue across the galaxy.

== Development ==
Cosmic Fantasy 2 was the first video game published by a third-party on a CD-based console. A potential re-release was stated by Vic Ireland, President of Gaijinworks, to be difficult due to Telenet having gone bankrupt. Sunsoft eventually acquired Telenet's catalogue of games, which lead to Gaijinworks to announce plans for re-releases. Limited Run Games released the first Cosmic Fantasy Collection in English in January 2024 and features new English translations of the first two games.

== Release and reception ==
Reception

Review scores
| Publication | Score |
|---|---|
| Electronic Gaming Monthly | 8/10, 7/10, 7/10, 6/10 |
| Famitsu | 7/10, 6/10, 8/10, 5/10 |
| RPGFan | 83% |

Award
| Publication | Award |
|---|---|
| Electronic Gaming Monthly | Best RPG Game of the Year |

Cosmic Fantasy 2 was released in Japan for the PC-Engine CD-ROM² on April 5, 1991.

Cosmic Fantasy 2 was awarded Best RPG Game of the Year for 1992 by Electronic Gaming Monthly. They stated that, with "dozens of detailed cinemas, an original plot, a huge world to traverse" and a challenging quest, "this CD literally blows away all of the other RPGs to date!" RPGFan praised the game for its storyline, gameplay, and art, but noted that the gameplay was typical of the genre and that load times before its frequent battles were frustrating. Writer Christian Nutt felt that Cosmic Fantasy 2 was the most promising choice for "the next great RPG" and discussed how compelled he was to progress in the story and see the game's cutscenes.

Cosmic Fantasy 2 has an install base of 20,000, and sold nearly 1:1 with the TurboGrafx CD-ROM.
