= Beast Wrestler =

1991 video game

- Developer: Riot
- Publishers: JP: Riot; NA: Renovation Products
- Composers: Shinobu Ogawa; Takaharu Umezu
- Platform: Sega Genesis
- Release: JP: November 29, 1991; NA: March 1992
- Genre: Fighting
- Modes: Single-player, multiplayer

Beast Wrestler (Note: Japanese: ビースト・ウォリアーズ; "Beast Warriors") is a 1991 fighting game published for the Mega Drive in Japan and North America. The cover art was made by Yasushi Nirasawa, in his position as a model-builder for Hobby Japan magazine.

== Gameplay ==
Two beasts battling each other.

Beast Wrestler is a wrestling video game containing two modes: Match and Tournament. Match is a single-round that can be played with two human players or one player and a computer opponent. Tournament has multiple rounds and requires the player to fight every beast in the game.

== Reception ==
Reception

Review scores
Publication	Score
Aktueller Software Markt	4/12
Beep! MegaDrive	4.75/10
Computer and Video Games	26/100
Famitsu	5/10, 5/10, 5/10, 5/10
Games-X	2/5
Joystick	60%
Console XS	30/100
Entertainment Weekly	C+
Mega	29%
MegaTech	45%
Sega Pro	30/100

The presentation, although generally the most-well received aspect of Beast Wrestler, garnered a mixed response. Joystick called it the best part.

Paul Rand of Computer and Video Games found the premise of monsters in a wrestling game interesting, but strongly dismissed its gameplay as "dull, simplistic and annoying in equal parts", heavily attributed to unresponsive controls. He also criticized the unsuitable music and visuals. Although appreciating the monsters' design, he was critical of the sprites' animation, shadows, their identical sizes, and flickering. Mega also found it a "tedious" experience with very few attacks to experiment with. He disliked the graphics, such as the "boring empty ring-type arena thingy" and choppy animation.

Entertainment Weekly's Bob Strauss called the gameplay tedious, despite its "thumb-busting array of holds and throws". He lauded the presentation such as the "electrified, three-dimensional playing field" and "appropriately gruesome creatures (which look like something out of a David Cronenberg movie)", although also joked, "When the monsters tangle it up in the ring, you're reminded of those intricate mating rituals Marlin Perkins used to narrate on Wild Kingdom."
