= Exile (1988 video game series) =

Exile XZR
- Genre: Action role-playing game
- Developers: Telenet Japan, Riot
- Publishers: Telenet Japan, Working Designs, Riot, Renovation Products
- Platforms: PC-8801 MSX2, PC-9801, X1 turbo, TurboGrafx-16, Sega Genesis
- First release: XZR; 1988
- Latest release: Exile: Wicked Phenomenon; 1993

Exile (エグザイル, Eguzairu; originally stylized XZR) is an action role-playing video game series developed by Telenet Japan. The first two games in the series, XZR and XZR II were both released in Japan in 1988, with versions available for the NEC PC-8801, NEC PC-9801, MSX2 and the X1 turbo (for the first game only). In 1991, a remake of XZR II simply titled Exile was released for the PC Engine and Mega Drive. These versions were both released in North America the following year, with Working Designs handling the localization for the TurboGrafx-CD version, while Renovation Products published the Genesis version. A sequel exclusive to the Super CD-ROM^{2} format, titled Exile: Wicked Phenomenon, was released in 1992, which was also localized by Working Designs for the North American market.

The Exile series centers on Sadler, a Syrian Assassin, who is the main character of each game. The original computer versions were notorious for featuring various references to religious historical figures, modern political leaders, iconography, drugs, and time-traveling assassins, although some of these aspects were considerably toned down or omitted in the later console games, with the English versions rewriting all the historical religious organizations into fictional groups.

== Games ==
=== XZR: Hakai no Gūzō ===
A top-down perspective scene from the MSX version of XZR.

XZR (エグザイル 破戒の偶像, Eguzairu: Hakai no Gūzō; lit. "XZR: Idols of Apostate"), the first game in the series, was originally released for the NEC PC-8801 in July 1988. It was subsequently released for the MSX2 and NEC PC-9801 on August and for the X1 turbo on September. The gameplay included action-platform elements, switching between an overhead perspective and side-scrolling sections. The plot of the original XZR has been compared to the later Assassin's Creed video game series. The soundtrack for the PC-8801 version was composed by Yujiroh, Shinobu Ogawa and Tenpei Sato.

The game centers on Sadler, a Syrian Assassin (a Shia Islamic sect) who is on a journey to kill the Caliph. The intro sequence briefly covers the history of the Middle East from 622 CE, the first year of the Islamic calendar, including a brief description of the Hijra, up until 1104 CE, the year of Sadler's birth. The game then starts in Baghdad, where Sadler rescues Rumi, and follows Sadler to Persia and then Babylon, where he must defend the Euphrates River from pollution by an oil magnate, encounter the Assyrian queen Semiramis and Babylonian goddess Ishtar, and visit the Tower of Babel in search of unicorns, before heading to Alexandria, becoming baptised in a Jewish village, and searching for Ouroboros. Eventually, Sadler makes his way back to Baghdad and murders the Caliph. It is then revealed that the Caliph was his father and they were separated when Sadler was kidnapped as a baby by the Assassins. The game then switches focus and enters a subplot about a Mongol invasion before Sadler is warped to the 20th century, where he must assassinate the Soviet General Secretary and the American President, ending the game.

Likely because of its controversial ending, Telenet chose not to port the original XZR when they decided to bring the series to home consoles three years later, opting to remake the sequel instead.

=== XZR II: Kanketsuhen ===
XZR II (エグザイルII 完結編, Eguzairu Tsū: Kanketsuhen; lit. "XZR II: Final Chapter") was released on December 17, 1988, for the NEC PC-8801, NEC PC-9801, and MSX2. The soundtrack for the PC-8801 version was once again composed by Shinobu Ogawa and Tenpei Sato.

XZR II depicts the further adventures of Sadler after the events of the previous game. Now living in the time of the Christian Crusades, Sadler makes an attempt to unite the world under one God and achieve world peace. Along the way, he performs a Masonic ritual in an attempt to revive Mani, and slaughters many Hindu and Buddhist deities. Sadler meets the head of the Knights Templar, Hugues de Payens, and helps him search for the Holimax, a holy artefact. Sadler travels to several different countries, including France (where Rumi is kidnapped), India, Cambodia, and Japan. In a Cambodian temple, Sadler resurrects the Manichaean prophet Mani. In Japan, Sadler rescues Ninkan, who in real life was head of Japanese sex cult Tachikawa-ryu. Afterwards, Sadler travels back in time to Eden and meets Bacchus. Sadler also murders Hiram Abiff, a Masonic figure. After defeating Jubelum of the Three Ruffians, Sadler receives the Holimax.

=== Exile ===
Exile (エグザイル〜時の狭間へ〜, Eguzairu: Toki no Hazama e; lit. "Exile: Into the Boundaries of Time"), the first console installment of the series, was first released for the PC Engine CD-ROM^{2} System on March 29, 1991. A Mega Drive version was released during the same year on December 6. Both versions of the game were released in North America the following year, with the Genesis version published by Renovation Products in March and the TurboGrafx-CD version published by Working Designs in October. Exile is a remake of XZR II which rewrites most of the story, cutting one portion of the final act in which Sadler time travels to the present day (as it referenced the ending to the original XZR), and removes the character of Sufrawaldhi, Sadler's fourth traveling companion.

The Genesis version removed scenes deemed inappropriate, such as a burning village and instances of naked women in the later areas. Working Designs was asked by NEC to change some of the names in the TurboGrafx-CD version, concerned about the religious and drug-related elements. "Hence, the Christian Crusaders became the Klispin Crusaders. Given the rules from NEC, it was a pretty sensitive subject, so direct references had to be changed", explained Vic Ireland, who worked closely with the game's localization. A town of crucified heretics being burned alive was left in the TurboGrafx-CD release, but removed from the Genesis version.

=== Exile: Wicked Phenomenon ===
The cover of the US version featured a photograph of a handcrafted final boss.

Exile: Wicked Phenomenon (エグザイルII 邪念の事象, Eguzairu Tsū: Janen no Jishō; lit. "Exile II: Wicked Phenomenon"), the final game in the series, was released in Japan for the Super CD-ROM^{2} add-on on September 22, 1992. It was released in North America in June 1993, once again published by Working Designs. While the previous games featured heavy religious elements, Sadler is now striving to defeat chaos and solve the mystery of an ancient tower.

The game's cover art featured a photograph, a rarity for North America, of the game's final boss, handcrafted. Vic Ireland commented on it, saying that "the Exile 2 cover is polarizing. People love it or hate it. It's basically aping a style of diorama that was really popular to advertise games in Japan. NCS/MASAYA did quite a bit of it, and I wanted to bring that to the US as well. So, I chose Exile 2 as the game to try this on. The practical effects guy who did the little models on the set in the ad, had done FX work for movies like Tremors and has since done work for WETA in Australia. The smoke was a time exposure to give it a thickness and glow. When we ran the ad, EGM or Gamepro (I can't remember) sent us a survey they did months later with their readers that had that ad listed as the 'most remembered' ad from the whole magazine, which, I think, justified the experiment. We tried it again for Vasteel, but the results weren't that great, so we only used part of one of the space scenes on the back cover of the jewel case".

== Common elements ==
=== Characters ===
The protagonist of the series is Sadler (voiced by Kaneto Shiozawa in the Japanese CD-ROM version and by Blake Dorsey in English), a young warrior from the village of Assassi who excels in swordsmanship and martial arts. His companions include Rumi (voiced by Yūko Minaguchi in Japanese and Rhonda Gibson in English), a female fellow warrior from Assassi skilled in acrobatics and espionage; Fakhyle (voiced by Kōji Yada in Japanese and Keith Lack in English), an elderly magician who lends his powers to Sadler; and Kindhy (voiced by Hirohiko Kakegawa in Japanese and by an unknown actor in English), a silent giant with unmatched superhuman strength.

=== Gameplay ===
The series' games feature side-scrolling areas where players fight enemies. This is the final battle from Wicked Phenomenon.

The XZR/Exile series are action role-playing games consisting of three types of play modes: the hideout screens, the RPG screens, and the action screens. The hideout screen consists of a menu in which the player can plan out Sadler's next course of actions by viewing his current companions, belongings, and stats, before choosing the next location to visit. The game switches to RPG mode when the player visits a town, which consists of an overhead map that the player must explore in order to gather clues and proceed through the story. This usually consists of talking to supporting characters to fulfill any tasks they give in order to gain access to new locations. The player can also visit various types of shops to buy new equipment and items. When the player enters a dungeon, the game switches to a side-scrolling action stage in which Sadler must fight his way through enemies, finding treasure chests along the way, until achieving an objective or finding an exit. While Sadler fights primarily with his sword, he can also use magic spells once he acquires the ability to do so. Like in most action RPGs, Sadler gains a certain amount of cash and experience points for every enemy he kills. In addition to HP (hit points) and MP (magic points), two more statistics are represented on screen: AP (attack power, the player's offensive capabilities) and AC (armor class, the player's defensive capabilities), which are determined by Sadler's current level and equipment.

One notable aspect in the original computer versions are the presence of illicit drugs. In addition to conventional items such as a potions and medical herbs, Sadler also uses narcotics such as hashish, coca, opiates, LSD, marijuana and peyote to heal himself or increase other attributes. The player's AP and AC statistics (represented by a heart-rate graph in the computer versions and green bars in the console version) are affected by the drugs Sadlers uses. Overusing certain drugs would result in side effects, including death. Exile, the console version of XRZ II, replaced most of the illicit drugs with fictionalized equivalents (e.g. Opiates became Heartpoisons), that lack the negative side effects of their original counterparts.

Exile: Wicked Phenomenon revamps several aspects of the previous games, ditching the hideout screens and adding the option to switch between Sadler or any of his companions (Rumi, Kindi and Fakhyle) during action segments, using each of their unique abilities. Wicked Phenomenon also brings back all the illicit narcotics missing in the original Exile, with the English version of the game using altered spellings for their names (e.g. cannabis became "cananavis"). While the AP and AC gauges are no longer present on the HUD (which instead shows the player's health, experience points and cash), the player can still use drugs to temporarily enhance their offensive and defensive stats.

== Reception ==
Exile was rated 24.23 out of 30 by Japanese magazine PC Engine Fan. It was later named one of "Renovation's Top 10 Games" on IGN. Levi Buchanan of IGN said that "the translation in the Genesis edition is pretty bad, but that has little effect on the breadth of the adventure itself". The game was also featured in a positive light in the book The 8-Bit Book – 1981 to 199x by Jerry Ellis.
