= Pop'n Magic =

1992 video game

- Developer(s): Riot
- Publisher(s): Telenet Japan
- Producer(s): Eiji Kikuchi
- Designer(s): Akifumi Kaneko
- Programmer(s): Hironori Ahiko
- Artist(s): Masato Kanamono
- Composer(s): Hiroaki Kai; Gō Takano; Minoru Yuasa; Toshiya Sasaki
- Platform(s): PC Engine Super CD-ROM²
- Release: JP: July 24, 1992
- Genre(s): Platform
- Mode(s): Single-player, multiplayer

Pop'n Magic is a 1992 video game for the PC Engine Super CD-ROM². It is a puzzle game developed and published by Telenet Japan.

== Gameplay ==
Gameplay screenshot

The gameplay is somewhat similar to Bubble Bobble and Don Doko Don. The game features two characters, Pop and Magic. The two characters have the same abilities and do not differ in any way. The game features character designs that resemble anime, as well as full animated cutscenes between worlds, with Japanese voice acting. The audio for the game is full CD audio.

== Development and release ==
The game took only three months to complete. The game was released on July 24, 1992, for the PC-Engine CD.

== Reception ==
Reception

Review scores
| Publication | Score |
|---|---|
| Consoles + | 27% |
| Famitsu | 5/10, 4/10, 5/10, 4/10 |
| Gekkan PC Engine | 85/100, 80/100, 80/100, 75/100, 75/100 |
| Marukatsu PC Engine | 6/10, 7/10, 6/10, 5/10 |
| Consolemania | 85/100 |
| Electric Brain | 89% |

Pop'n Magic was met with mixed reviews.
