= Granada (video game) =

1990 video game

- Developer: Wolf Team
- Publisher: Wolf Team
- Producer: Masahiro Akishino
- Designer: Toshio Toyota
- Programmer: Tadakatsu Ogura
- Artists: Hirokazu Nagata; Manabu Sato; Masayuki Matsushima
- Writer: Kazuyoshi Inoue
- Composers: Masaaki Uno; Motoi Sakuraba; Yasunori Shiono
- Platforms: X68000, Sega Genesis
- Release: X68000: JP: 20 April 1990; Mega Drive/Genesis: JP: 16 November 1990; NA: 1990
- Genre: Shooter
- Mode: Single-player

Granada (Note: Japanese: グラナダ, Hepburn: Guranada; sometimes mistakenly referred to as "XGranadaX" or "Granada X" because of ambiguity in the design of the logo.) is a shooter video game developed and originally published by Wolf Team exclusively for the X68000 in Japan on 20 April 1990. The ninth title to be created and released by Wolf Team for the X68000 platform, the game is set in a futuristic Africa in 2016 where a war erupted over mining rights towards rare metals and has quickly escalated due to newly introduced weapons called Maneuver Cepters. Players assume the role of mercenary Leon Todo piloting the titular Maneuver Cepter tank unit in an attempt to stop the conflict once and for all. Its gameplay mainly consists of action and shooting mixed with mission-based exploration using a main two-button configuration.

Developed over the course of two years, Granada became the first project by Wolf Team that placed emphasis on gameplay instead of plot and was influenced by various arcade games like Grobda and Assault by Namco. Initially launched for the X68000 home computer, the title was later ported to the Sega Genesis, which was published across several regions during the same year such as Japan by Wolf Team and North America by Renovation Products respectively, featuring several changes compared with the original version. The X68000 version has since been re-released only in Japan through download services for Microsoft Windows.

Granada became a popular title among the X68000 userbase from Wolf Team during its release for a brief period and was eventually nominated for a "Game of the Year" award by Japanese magazine Oh!X before ultimately losing against other titles on the system. The Sega Genesis version garnered generally positive reception from critics, who commended several aspects such as the presentation, graphics, sound design, controls, gameplay and replay value. Retrospective reviews for the Genesis version have been equally positive in recent years.

== Gameplay ==
Gameplay screenshot from the original Sharp X68000 version

Granada is a multidirectional shooter game similar to Thunder Force where players assume the role of mercenary Leon Todo taking control of the titular Maneuver Cepter tank unit through eight stages of varying themes set on Africa in order to complete a series of objectives as attempts to fight against the enemies and ultimately end the ongoing conflict in the region. Before starting a new game, players have access to the configuration menu at the title screen, where various settings can be adjusted such as controls and choosing any of the four levels of difficulty, each one applying a different stipulation during gameplay depending on the version that is being played.

The players are situated in a large field full of enemies, obstacles, and enemy generators that may be freely moved upon, unlike most conventional shooter titles and the main goal of each level is to destroy each main enemy signalized as red dots on the HUD located on the bottom right corner of the screen, with the last objective being a boss that must be fought at the end of the stage in order to progress further before the timer runs out. Players can also collect items scattered across the stage to increase their available arsenal.

Controlling the tank is done with a directional pad, which moves and rotates the unit across 16 directions and players have two methods of attacking enemies and bosses; The main fire button unleashes rapid-fire shots, while pressing both fire buttons at the same time activates a powerful energy shot capable of pushing back the tank with a recoil effect. Pressing the secondary fire button locks the tank's firing position and players can strafe on any direction until the button is pressed again to unlock the firing position. The Sega Genesis port uses a three-button configuration instead of the original two-button setup, assigning every action into their respective button. The tank will explode if it sustains too much enemy damage, with the players losing a life as a result and once all lives are lost, the game is over.

== Plot ==
The plot summary of Granada varies between the two versions. In October 2016, the "African Civil War" that broke out over the interests of rare metals was steadily intensified by the introduction of new tactical weapons known as Maneuver Cepter, or MC for short, on the behalf of long-range nuclear weapons. About a while after the war, abnormality occurred on the front line, where heavy mobile weapons from both north and south factions were destroyed by an unknown MC unit only known as "Granada", which would eventually be referred to as "God of Africa" or "Ghost of a soldier", whose origins remain uncertain and is piloted by mercenary Leon Todo. A month prior, Leon accepted a request from a female agent that led him to Japan, where he finds the titular MC tank unit but the agent who informed Leon of his request died soon after. While holding a suspicion, Leon boards the tank and quickly learns that he was deceived, with the engine roaring in the skies of Africa and heading towards Nigeria, with the main purpose being retribution.

== Development and release ==
Granada was created by Wolf Team over the course of two years, serving as their ninth title to be developed and published for the Sharp X68000 after Arcshu: Kagerō no Jidai o Koete. In a 1990 interview with Japanese publication Micom BASIC Magazine, the company and its members recounted about the creation process of the game, with designer and writer Kazuyoshi Inoue stating that Namco's Grobda and Assault were influences on the title, as co-designer and programmer Toshio Toyota was a fan of arcade games, while Toyota himself also claimed the team revisited some of the larger sprites until those they felt satisfied with were used in the final product. Producer Masahiro Akishino also stated the game became their first project that placed heavy emphasis on gameplay instead of plot, as he felt that previously published Wolf Team titles had poorly balanced sections in terms of structure. Composers Masaaki Uno, Motoi Sakuraba and Yasunori Shiono were responsible for co-writing the soundtrack, while Uno stated that the project was also the company's first commercial title to present full MIDI support.

Granada was first released for the X68000 on 20 April 1990. Early previews showcased a different GUI design during gameplay, before the game was ultimately polished prior to release. The game was ported to the Sega Genesis seven months later and was first released in Japan on 16 November by Wolf Team, serving as their second title for the platform after Final Zone, then in North America a month later by Renovation Products and finally in Brazil by Tec Toy during the same period. A European release of the Sega Genesis version was planned to be published by UbiSoft as a result of a multi-game licensing deal with Renovation, but was never officially released in the region for unknown reasons.

Both the original X68000 version and the later Genesis port are similar but have a number of key differences between each other such as the latter having a smaller color palette that lead to sprites being recolored in different ways, lack of both introductory and intermission sequences and minor level redesigns compared with the original, among other changes. However, the Genesis port retains most of the special effects featured in the original X68000 version, includes a brand-new seventh level and runs at a higher frame rate but suffers a greater amount of slowdown. The original X68000 version has since been re-released in digital form for Microsoft Windows through D4 Enterprise's Project EGG service on 21 February 2004. The Genesis version of Granada is included as part of the Renovation Collection 1 compilation for Evercade, marking its first official appearance in European regions.

== Reception ==
Reception

Aggregate score
Aggregator	Score
GameRankings	(Genesis) 80.50%

Review scores
Publication	Score
IGN	(Genesis) 8.2 / 10
Beep! Mega Drive	(Genesis) 33 / 40
CVG Mean Machines	(Genesis) 80%
Consoles +	(Genesis) 76%
Electronic Gaming Monthly	(Genesis) 8/10, 8/10, 8/10, 8/10
Famitsu	(Genesis) 23/40
Génération 4	(Genesis) 7 / 10
HonestGamers	(Genesis) 4/5
Joystick	(Genesis) 71% (Genesis) 70%
Mean Machines	(Genesis) 82%
Mega Drive Advanced Gaming	(Genesis) 71%
MegaTech	(Genesis) 86%
Oh!X	(X68000) 6 / 10 (X68000) 8 / 10
Sega Power	(Genesis) 4/5
Sega Pro	(Genesis) 73 / 100 (Genesis) 83 / 100 (Genesis) 83 / 100
Technopolis	(X68000) 6/7
User	(Genesis) 84 / 100

Award
Publication	Award
Oh!X (1990)	#8 1990年度Oh!X Game of the Year

Granada became a popular title among the X68000 userbase from Wolf Team during its release for a brief period and was eventually nominated for a "Game of the Year" award by Oh!X magazine but lost against other titles such as Dungeon Master. The Sega Genesis port garnered generally positive reception from critics who commended several aspects such as the presentation, graphics, sound design, controls, gameplay and replay value. In their respective retrospective reviews, gaming websites HonestGamers and IGN praised the Genesis version as well. In 2019, Den of Geek placed the Genesis version on their top 50 underrated Sega Mega Drive games at number 22.
