= Kiaidan 00 =

1992 video game

- Cover art by Yuji Kaida
- Developer: Alfa System
- Publisher: Riot
- Director: Tsunayoshi Orihara
- Producers: Shinobu Ogawa; Tetsuya Sasaki
- Designer: Motoshi Kubo
- Programmer: Shinichi Nogami
- Artist: Motoshi Kubo
- Writer: Motoshi Kubo
- Composers: Amae Nekono; Yūji Yoshikawa; Yumiko Morinaga
- Platform: PC Engine Super CD-ROM²
- Release: JP: October 23, 1992
- Genre: Horizontal-scrolling shooter
- Mode: Single-player

Kiaidan 00 (Note: Japanese: キアイダン00(ダブルオー), Hepburn: Kiaidan Daburu Ō) is a 1992 mecha side-scrolling shoot 'em up video game released by Riot for the NEC PC Engine Super CD-ROM².

== Gameplay ==
Gameplay screenshot

Kiaidan 00 is a side-scrolling shoot 'em up game.

== Development and release ==
Kiaidan 00 was published by Riot.

== Reception ==
Reception

Review scores
Publication	Score
Famitsu	7/10, 5/10, 5/10, 5/10
Gekkan PC Engine	85/100, 80/100, 90/100, 80/100, 75/100
Marukatsu PC Engine	6/10, 7/10, 7/10, 6/10
Mega Fun	58/100

Kiaidan 00 received average reviews. It received a score of 22 out of 30 in a 1993 readers' poll conducted by PC Engine Fan, ranking among PC Engine titles at the number 161 spot.
