= Final Zone =

1990 video game

- US cover art
- Developer: Wolf Team
- Publishers: JP: Wolf Team; NA: Renovation Products
- Producer: Masahiro Akishino
- Designer: Kazuyoshi Inoue
- Programmers: Hiroshi Izumino; Masahiko Sugiyama
- Artist: Haruhiko Mikimoto
- Composers: Motoi Sakuraba; Masaaki Uno; Yasunori Shiono
- Platforms: Sega Genesis, X68000
- Release: Mega Drive/Genesis: JP: October 12, 1990; NA: December 1990; PlayStation 4, PlayStation 5, Xbox One, Xbox Series X/S, Nintendo Switch, Windows: WW: May 9, 2025
- Genre: Scrolling shooter
- Mode: Single-player

Final Zone (known in Japan as FZ Senki Axis (FZ戦記AXIS)) is a 1990 isometric scrolling shooter developed and published by Wolf Team. Players take on the role of a mecha operator outfitted in the NAP suit. The NAP suit can carry 14 weapons out of the 20 available weapons and it is up to the player to use them to their maximum benefit. It is the third game released in the Final Zone series, following Final Zone Wolf and Final Zone II. On May 9, 2025 the game got ported to modern consoles as a re-release from Ratalaika Games.

== Plot ==
The player assumes the role of Howard Bowie, the heroic soldier of the El Sharia Military Nation's foreign legion and commander of the unit known as "Team Undead". It is 100 years in the future and weapons of mass destruction have been banned from the field of war. Fighting is now done with the futuristic power armor known as the New Age Power Suit (NAP). Howard is assigned to use his K-19 Phantom NAP to infiltrate enemy territory to Point A-46K Bloody Axis and destroy the sole remaining weapon of mass destruction.

== Gameplay ==
Players must traverse various battlefields and destroy a requisite number of specific enemy types in order to proceed to the end-level boss. Players can collect a large amount of weapons, but can only equip and use two at a time. Players can also equip a primary weapon to the NAP's arm and a side weapon attached to the NAP's back. Doing so unleashes one of two different variations of attack the weapon offers, but if the NAP suit is too heavily damaged, most of the weapons the player has collected previously will be lost, as well as the use of their side weapon.
