= PlayStation World =

Monthly video game magazine

- Cover of PSW
- Editor: Ian Dean
- Categories: Computer and video games
- Frequency: Four-weekly (13 issues per annum)
- Circulation: 17,132
- Publisher: Future plc
- Founded: 2000
- Final issue: 2009
- Country: United Kingdom
- Language: English
- ISSN: 1468-7240

PlayStation World (PSW) was a monthly video games magazine that covered the PlayStation brand. The pages were featured news, previews, reviews and letter pages. It was launched in 2000, published by Computec Media. The magazine had a circulation of 17,132 along with a readership of 210,000. The UK portion of Computec Media was acquired by Future Publishing in 2003, with the title added to Future's portfolio. At the time of the acquisition, the magazine had an average monthly circulation of 53,349. By 2007, the magazine's circulation had decreased to 17,132. On 13 August 2009, Future Publishing announced it was to close the PSW magazine, citing "decreasing demand" as the reason for the publication's closure.

PSW also included a DVD; showing clips, trailers, reviews and previews of the latest games. The DVD menu was based upon Sony's XMB (Xross Media Bar). This DVD later became relatively infamous after it was discovered a trailer for Tetsuo: The Iron Man was accidentally hidden on several discs. Along with the DVD, the magazine occasionally came with an additional booklet (cheat book or game guide) and a promotional article (as in a newspaper or similar) on an upcoming game.

In February 2011, a new PlayStation World was launched (commonly abbreviated PSW) and has a YouTube channel named 1playstationworld. The new PSW has its own domain name, website and forum.
