= Gaiares =

1990 video game

- Japanese cover art with Dan Dare's starfighter and the alien Queen of Leezaluth
- Developer: Telenet Japan
- Publishers: JP: Renovation Game; NA: Renovation Products
- Designers: Kōji Yokota; Masayasu Yamamoto; Takaki Iwata
- Composers: Shinobu Ogawa; Minoru Yuasa
- Platform: Genesis
- Release: JP: December 26, 1990; NA: February 1991
- Genre: Scrolling shooter
- Mode: Single-player

Gaiares (ガイアレス, Gaiaresu) is a horizontally scrolling shooter developed by Telenet Japan and published by Renovation for the Sega Genesis in 1990. It was one of the first 8Mb cartridge games on the Genesis. Its title combined Gaia (Mother Earth) and the suffix "less" (Res), as the Earth has been lost to pollution in the far future according to the game's plot (thus making mankind "Earthless").

== Plot ==
In the year 3008 Earth has become a toxic dump ravaged by careless humans, leaving an uninhabitable, polluted wasteland. The powerful alien space pirates Gulfer, led by the evil Queen ZZ Badnusty, plan to harvest the pollution to create weapons of mass destruction. The United Star Cluster of Leezaluth sent a warning to Earth about their plans, stating that if they could not stop them, Leezaluth would be forced to supernova Earth's sun to avoid war with Gulfer; but if humans succeeded, Leezaluth would use their technology to restore Earth to its former beauty.

Legendary space hero Dan Dare (Diaz in the Japanese original), a young but brave and very skilled ace pilot from Earth was chosen to be the pilot of a new starfighter to combat Gulfer. The ship is armed with a powerful experimental weapon from Leezaluth called the TOZ System, which would be operated by Alexis, an alien princess from Leezaluth and Dan's lover.

== Gameplay ==
Most horizontal shooters require the player's ship to come in contact with a capsule to gain weapons. In Gaiares the TOZ System device can be fired out like the R-Type's Force, except each time it comes in contact with an enemy, it would inherit and learn its weapon; the player can steal from the same enemy repeatedly until the weapon's strength is maxed out. There are 18 weapons in total to be captured, and the appearance of each weapon varies depending on the strength meter.

== Release ==
The 'professional gamer' who featured in magazine adverts for the US release was Jamie Bunker, who worked as a game tester at Renovation Products at the time of the original release. When Retro-Bit re-released the game in 2022, Jamie Bunker returned to recreate the original magazine advert to promote the re-release.

== Reception ==
Reception

Review scores
Publication	Score
Game Informer	9.25/10
IGN	8/10
MegaTech	84%

Gaiares was very well received. MegaTech opined it was "an excellent looking game, but by far the toughest horizontally scrolling shoot 'em up available on the Mega Drive". It was the first game to receive perfect scores in every category in GamePro.

A 2002 review by Game Informer called it "a shooter masterpiece" and "perhaps the greatest of all horizontally scrolling 2D shooters." A 2008 retrospective review by IGN called it "an excellent shooter that has aged quite well since the sunset of the Genesis."
