= Death Bringer =

1988 video game

Death Bringer Galdregon's Domain
- Commodore 64 cover art
- Developer: Pandora
- Publishers: Pandora; Spotlight Software
- Programmers: David Neale (Amiga); Steve Briggs (Atari ST)
- Artist: Robin Chapman Jeff Godfrey
- Writers: Ray Edwards; Simon Daniels
- Composer: Mike Brown
- Platforms: Amiga, Commodore 64, Atari ST
- Release: EU: 1988; NA: 1989
- Genre: Role-playing
- Mode: Single-player

Death Bringer, alternatively titled Galdregon's Domain in Europe, is a 1988 role-playing video game originally developed and self-published by Pandora and released for the Amiga, Atari ST, Commodore 64, and MS-DOS.

== Plot ==
Combat is turn-based.

The game is set in the fictional world of Mezron, where a wizard by the name of Azazeal has been resurrected and is searching for the five gems of Zator. The player takes control of a warrior charged with recovering the jewels by battling many minions who guard them, such as Medusa and High Priestess Set. They then venture into the catacombs of Castle Secnar and battle the undead.
