= Last Alert =

1989 video game

Last Alert Red Alert
- Developer: Sin-Nihon Laser Soft
- Publishers: Telenet Japan (JP), NEC (US)
- Director: M. Hanari
- Producer: F. Moriyama
- Designer: Y. Ohayashi
- Programmer: M. Hanari
- Writers: Y. Ohayashi; B. Matsui
- Composers: H. Inoue; J. Hasebe; S. Murakami
- Platform: TurboGrafx-CD
- Release: JP: December 15, 1989; NA: November 30, 1990
- Genre: Shooting game

Last Alert (known as Red Alert in Europe and Japan) is a single-player top down shooting game developed by Sin-Nihon Laser Soft. It was released in Japan in 1989 and North America in 1990 for the TurboGrafx-CD. The story is that of a lone soldier whose unit has been wiped out who has been tasked by the CIA to take down an international criminal syndicate.

== Story ==
Last Alert's story begins on November 20, 1988. Guy Kazama, an American commando in the Special Mission Unit, has been dispatched to the jungles of South America to rescue hostages upon a request from the Lloyd government. The request, however, was a trap, and Guy Kazama's unit is ambushed by an attack helicopter. Guy Kazama is the sole survivor of the ambush, and the antagonists of the game are introduced: an international arms band collectively known as the Force Project, whose ultimate goal is to rule the world. Its leaders are Colonel Jim Kadat of the Republic of Lybid, Mr. Tommy Lee of the Hong Kong mafia, Chairman Steve Lloyd of the Dual Foundation, and Dr. Che Garcia, a brilliant physicist.

Following the ambush, Secretary Harvey Leonard, Director of the CIA, is entrusted by President Allman with eliminating the Force Project. For this, Leonard enlists the help of Guy Kazama, whom he finds in a cemetery mourning his comrades. Leonard tasks him with infiltrating a military base, Blue Rhinos, which contains stealth aircraft and has already been infiltrated by an agent by the name of Spartan. Guy, wanting to avenge his comrades, accepts. Infiltrating the base, Guy finds Spartan being held hostage at gunpoint at the base's gate. Spartan informs Guy that the stealth bombers are at the back of the factory before being rescued by him. Guy destroys the aircraft and, after a confrontation with a tank, escapes with Spartan in a stealth bomber on the base's runway.

Meanwhile, the President's airplane has crashed on the eastern side of the Republic of Flett, a fictional arctic nation, where he is taken prisoner by an agent of the Force Project, Colonel Douglas Dark. Guy Kazama is sent by Leonard and his colleague Kay to the camp on top of Mount Alt where the President is being held to free him. Along the way, he rescues several hostages, is confronted by an imposter President, and defeats Dark.

After the President is rescued, Leonard sends Guy Kazama to find and assassinate Colonel Kadat, who has gone into hiding. First, he has to sneak into a camp and rescue another soldier, Robert, from imprisonment. Robert informs Guy that Kadat has three bodyguards, Red, Blue, and Black, who each have information on Kadat and his whereabouts. After defeating these bodyguards, Guy Kazama confronts the Colonel, who wields an electric shock whip, and kills him.

Mr. Lee holds a video conference with the other remaining heads of the Force Project who inform him of Kadat's death. As they have learned that Guy will use Mr. Lee's annual martial arts tournament to kill him, they present him with three of their toughest fighters. Mr. Lee also asks Dr. Garcia about the completion of his ultimate weapon, known as Indra. Dr. Garcia estimates that it will be completed within a month. Guy Kazama infiltrates the compound where the tournament is being held, kills Mr. Lee's fighters, and makes his way to the top of the tower in the middle of the compound where Mr. Lee awaits him. Guy Kazama kills Mr. Lee and sets his sights on Chairman Steve.

Some time after Mr. Lee's death, Guy Kazama is seen on a cruise ship, where Steve Lloyd is giving a speech at a party in celebration of his Dual Foundation. Guy reveals to Kay that the man giving the speech is a body double for Lloyd and that the real Lloyd is somewhere else on the ship. Guy also reveals that he has planted explosives on the ship to create a diversion that will allow him to find Chairman Steve in the ensuing chaos. Guy Kazama makes his way through the party to the secret armory in the lower decks where he confronts and kills Chairman Steve.

Following Lloyd's death, Dr. Garcia contacts the President, giving him an ultimatum of 24 hours before Indra destroys the world and challenging Guy Kazama to stop his plans. Guy arrives at a station on the Moon where Indra is being constructed. There he kills a resurrected Dark, destroys a creature known as the biomonster, and confronts Dr. Garcia, who flees on a space shuttle to Indra, which is revealed to be a space station orbiting the Moon. Guy follows shortly thereafter. Guy confronts and kills Dr. Garcia, who is revealed to be a cyborg. He warns Guy that, in order to stop Indra, he must destroy Indra, which will kill him. Guy destroys the supercomputer controlling Indra, which, in turn, destroys the space station. Guy falls to Earth in an escape capsule where he contacts Leonard to retrieve him from the ocean.

== Gameplay ==
Last Alert features somewhat basic top-down shoot 'em up gameplay. In addition to a primary weapon which has unlimited ammunition, there are consumables such as a flamethrower, grenades, and a hovering turret. There are also minor RPG mechanics, such as a points system, class leveling, and weapon upgrades. In the game, the player gains experience points by killing enemies or completing objectives. These points allow the player to reach new classes, and each new class serves to raise the player's "vital", or health. Furthermore, gaining levels grants the player access to new primary weapons; the player starts with an M1911A1, but through leveling obtains an Uzi, an M16, an M203, an LMG, and a rocket launcher, each progressively more powerful than the last.

The game has a number of stages hosted over six maps. Each stage has infinitely spawning enemies and, except for one, has a boss fight at the end. There are three variants of stages denoted by different colored markers on the hub map. Blue markers (Type A) indicate a mission where the only goal is to reach the end and kill the boss, red markers (Type B) indicate a stealth mission where firing anything other than the pistol will spawn more enemies, and yellow markers (Type C) indicate a mission with a special objective, such as freeing hostages. In addition to this, the player is required to reach the end of the stage under a certain time limit, which kills them instantly if it reaches zero. Any deaths result in a game over and require the player to continue from the beginning of the stage.

Stylistically and gameplay-wise, the game is similar to Bloody Wolf. However, unlike Bloody Wolf, Last Alert is on a CD-ROM. This allows it more storage space, and it uses that storage space for voiced dialogue – something that was uncommon at the time – its soundtrack, and cutscenes.

== Reception ==
Reception

Review scores
Publication	Score
Famitsu	24/40
PC Engine FAN	21 /30
Génération 4	75/100
Tilt	90 /100
Joystick	94 /100
TurboPlay	80 /100
PowerPlay	78 /100

While it received generally warm reception when it was released and was especially praised for its graphics and music, it received criticism by some for linear and repetitive gameplay. It has, however, received praise for its snappy controls, balanced experience point system, and comedic value in the campy story, dialogue, and acting. The Japanese version, on the other hand, has received praise for its voice acting.

Electronic Gaming Monthly listed Guy Kazama as #4 on its "Top 10 List of Video Game Blabbermouths", listing voice acting they considered "goofy" or causing laughter because of its poor quality.

== See also ==
- List of TurboGrafx-16 games
