= Anett Futatabi =

1993 video game

Annet Returns
- Cover art
- Developer: Wolf Team
- Publisher: Wolf Team
- Director: Toru Shimizu
- Artist: Masatomo Sudo
- Composer: Motoi Sakuraba
- Platform: Mega CD
- Release: JP: March 30, 1993
- Genres: Beat 'em up, hack and slash
- Mode: Single-player

Anett Futatabi is a 1993 beat 'em up video game by Wolf Team for the Mega CD. It is the final in a trilogy of games that also includes Earnest Evans and El Viento. The game was released only in Japan in 1993. As part of the Earnest Evans Collection, the game was officially in English for the first time as Annet Returns on January 16, 2026.

== Gameplay ==
Anett fighting against one of the game's bosses

Unlike the first and second entries, which are 2D platform video games, Annet Returns is a side-scrolling beat 'em up that deeply resembles Sega's Golden Axe and Streets of Rage franchises. However, like the previous installments, the story is told through cutscenes between each brief multi-scrolling level, which includes a boss character, who appears out of thin air, usually wielding a weapon.

The protagonist Annet's magic has five levels, is regulated by a power meter, and regenerates automatically. As her power meter increases, the higher her magical attacks become. The levels range from wind, earth, water, fire and death. Wind is the lower level, while death is the highest level. However, magic cannot be used against the bosses. In addition to magic, Annet wields a sword, rather than bladed boomerangs. There are not any other weapons or power-ups included in the game, other than health restoration items.

== Plot ==
Set in the same fictional universe as Earnest Evans and El Viento, the story takes place two years after El Viento, and concludes the story of Annet and Earnest. Zigfried's true motives are finally revealed as well. Being rescued from a certain sacrifice by father figure Earnest Evans, Annet travels across Europe and encounters a local sect that wants her special pendant. After an attempted ambush in the sect's castle, she barely escapes, and begins another quest to protect the world from destruction.

== Reception ==
The game was received poorly, with the difficulty and graphics highlighted as the main criticisms. However, the cutscenes' graphics were praised. Writing for Hardcore Gaming 101, Kurt Kalata criticized the game design and difficulty, saying, "Most of the end level monstrosities have pretty braindead attack patterns, but they're so strong that it's hard to attack them efficiently [...] The extreme level of challenge is clearly to mask the fact that there just isn't much game here." Kalata also criticized the graphics, saying, "The in-game graphics are pretty average. Although Annet looks much cooler here than she did in El Viento, the rest of the visuals are run of the mill and forgettable." He praised the cutscenes, saying "Anyone with a fetish for the 16-bit, low color, '90s style anime artwork that proliferated on the Mega CD and PC Engine will love this." Ken Horowitz of Sega-16 compared the game unfavorably to Streets of Rage, saying, "Playing more like Streets of Rage than El Viento, Anet Futatabi comes off as the bastard child of two genres – a part of both, yet truly belonging to neither." He also praised the cutscenes, saying "There are also plenty of beautiful cut scenes to gander at between each [stage]", but criticized the non-cutscene graphics, calling them "bland".
