= Telenet Japan =

Japanese game developer

Telenet Japan Co., Ltd.
- Native name: 株式会社日本テレネット
- Romanized name: Kabushiki-gaisha Nihon Terenetto
- Industry: Software development
- Founded: October 1983; 43 years ago
- Founder: Kazuyuki Fukushima
- Defunct: October 25, 2007; 19 years ago
- Fate: Bankruptcy
- Website: http://www.telenet.co.jp/ (archived)

Telenet Japan Co., Ltd. (株式会社日本テレネット, Kabushiki-gaisha Nihon Terenetto) was a Japanese video game and software developer founded in October 1983 by Kazuyuki Fukushima. The company had several video game divisions including: Wolf Team, Laser Soft, Renovation Game, Renovation Products, and Riot.

== History ==
The company was founded in October 1983 by Kazuyuki Fukushima. The first division created was Wolf Team, which was created in 1986. The Riot division came into existence in 1991 when Telenet Japan was expanding in the country.

However, because Telenet was starting to lose sales in 1993, the company went through extensive restructuring which resulted in the closing of a few subsidiaries. Some staff employed at Laser Soft and Riot were transferred to another subsidiary, Wolfteam. The same year, several key developers of the PC Engine games Tenshi no Uta I & II left Riot to found Media.Vision and work on a new RPG franchise, Wild Arms.

With a debt of ¥1 billion, the company ceased operating in late September 2007 and closed its doors on October 25. According to the Tokyo Keizai, the company ran into debt in selling pachinko game software, which made the company get into debt due to the US branches failing.

Sunsoft acquired Telenet's entire software library in December 2009, citing plans to remake or re-release (via Virtual Console) the old titles. The Japanese company Edia acquired Telenet's catalogue from City Connection in January 2020.

== Organization ==
Telenet Japan was formerly made up of the following teams:

=== Laser Soft ===
Served as Telenet's publishing arm for optical media, such as PC Engine. It was later merged with Wolf Team.

=== Micro World ===
Micro World served as Telenet's publishing arm to localize and market non-Japanese games.

=== Renovation Games ===
Telenet Japan's Japanese publishing arm.

=== Renovation Products ===
Telenet Japan's North American subsidiary, Renovation Products, was acquired by Sega of America in 1993. It was formerly located in California.

=== Riot ===
Riot was also known for employing graphic artist and later game director Eiji Kikuchi, as well as music composer Michiko Naruke. It's sometimes known as Reno.

== Games list ==
=== Developed ===
- Mega Drive/Genesis
  - Beast Wrestler
  - Gaiares
  - Syd of Valis
  - Traysia
  - Valis: The Fantasm Soldier
  - Valis III
  - Ys III: Wanderers from Ys
- MSX
  - Andorogynus
  - XZR: Hakai no Gūzō
  - XZR II: Kanketsuhen
  - Sa-Zi-Ri
  - Valis: The Fantasm Soldier
  - Valis: The Fantasm Soldier II
  - Digital Devil Story: Megami Tensei
- Nintendo 64
  - Parlor Pro Pachinko
- GameCube
  - Swingerz Golf (released as Ace Golf in Europe and Wai Wai Golf in Japan)
- PlayStation 2
  - Eagle Eye Golf (released as Enjoy Golf! in Japan)
  - Mahjong Party: Idol to Mahjong Shoubu
- PC
  - Meccha Golf
- Super Famicom/Super NES
  - Ace o Nerae!
  - Dark Kingdom
  - Edo no Kiba
  - Psycho Dream
  - Super Valis IV
- Sharp X1/X1 Turbo
  - Digital Devil Story: Megami Tensei
- NEC PC-88/PC-8800 series
  - Digital Devil Story: Megami Tensei
- PC Engine/TurboGrafx-16/TurboGrafx
  - Avenger
  - Babel
  - Browning
  - Columns (video game)
  - Cosmic Fantasy
  - Cosmic Fantasy 2
  - Cosmic Fantasy Visual Collection
  - Cosmic Fantasy III
  - Cosmic Fantasy IV-Chapter 1
  - Cosmic Fantasy IV-Chapter 2
  - Death Bringer
  - Dekoboko Densetsu Hashiru Wagamanma
  - Exile
  - Exile: Wicked Phenomenon
  - Final Zone II
  - F1 Team Simulation Project F
  - Golden Axe
  - High Grenadier
  - Jantei Monogatari
  - Kiaidan 00
  - Lady Phantom
  - Last Alert
  - Legion
  - Maho Shoujo Silky Lip
  - Master of Monsters
  - Meikyu no Elfeene
  - Mirai Shounen Conan
  - Valis: The Fantasm Soldier
  - Valis II
  - Valis III
  - Valis IV
  - Valis Visual Collection
  - Police Connection
  - Pop'n Magic
  - Psychic Storm
  - Puzzle Boy
  - Sugoroku '92 Nari Tore Nariagari Trendy
  - Super Albatross
  - Tenshi no Uta
  - Tenshi no Uta II: Datenshi no Sentaku
  - Travel Epule
  - Xak I & II

=== Published ===
- Game Boy
  - Pachinko CR: Daiku no Gen-San GB
- Game Gear
  - Zan Gear
- Mega Drive/Genesis
  - Gaiares
  - Syd of Valis
  - The Tennis Tournament: Grandslam
  - Traysia
  - Valis III
  - Valis: The Fantasm Soldier
  - Zan: Yasha Enbukyoku
  - Arcus Odyssey
  - El Viento
  - Elemental Master
  - Gain Ground
  - Earnest Evans
  - Whip Rush
  - Arrow Flash
  - Dino Land
  - Exile
  - Beast Wrestler
  - Master of Monsters
  - Sol-Deace
  - Ys III: Wanderers from Ys
  - Granada
  - Final Zone
- Mega-CD
  - Cyborg 009
  - Sol-Feace
  - Cobra Command
  - Time Gal
  - Road Avenger
  - Cosmic Fantasy Stories
  - Earnest Evans
  - Anett Futatabi
- MSX
  - Sa-Zi-Ri
  - Valis II
  - Albatross Tournament Golf
  - American Truck
  - Digital Devil Story: Megami Tensei
- Nintendo 64
  - Parlor Pro Pachinko
- Sharp X1/X1 Turbo
  - Digital Devil Story: Megami Tensei
- NEC PC-88/PC-8800 series
  - Digital Devil Story: Megami Tensei
- PC
  - Albatross
  - Albatross 2: Master's History
  - Valis X (published by Eants, a hentai developer)
  - Zan
  - Zan II
  - Zan III
- PlayStation
  - Cybernetic Empire
- PlayStation 2
  - Enjoy Golf!
  - Mahjong Party: Idol to Mahjong Shoubu
- Super Famicom/Super NES
  - Dark Kingdom
  - Doomsday Warrior
  - The Journey Home: Quest for the Throne
  - Super Valis IV
  - Zan II Spirits
  - Zan III Spirits
  - Psycho Dream
- PC Engine/TurboGrafx-16/TurboGrafx
  - Andre Panza Kick Boxing
  - Avenger
  - Babel
  - Browning
  - Columns
  - Cosmic Fantasy
  - Cosmic Fantasy II
  - Cosmic Fantasy Visual Collection
  - Cosmic Fantasy III
  - Cosmic Fantasy IV-Chapter 1
  - Cosmic Fantasy IV-Chapter 2
  - Death Bringer
  - Dekoboko Densetsu Hashiru Wagamanma
  - Exile
  - Exile: Wicked Phenomenon
  - Final Zone II
  - F1 Team Simulation Project F
  - Golden Axe
  - High Grenadier
  - Jantei Monogatari
  - Kiaiden 00
  - Lady Phantom
  - Last Alert
  - Legion
  - Maho Shoujo Silky Lip
  - Meikyu no Elfeene
  - Mirai Shounen Conan
  - Super Albatross
  - Valis: The Fantasm Soldier
  - Valis II
  - Valis III
  - Valis IV
  - Valis Visual Collection
  - Police Connection
  - Pop'n Magic
  - Psychic Storm
  - Puzzle Boy
  - Sugoroku '92 Nari Tore Nariagari Trendy
  - Super Albatross
  - Tenshi no Uta
  - Tenshi no Uta II: Datenshi no Sentaku
  - Travel Apple
  - Xak I & II
- Sharp X68000
  - Death Bringer
  - Sol-Feace
