= Doomsday Warrior (video game) =

1992 video game

Doomsday Warrior Taiketsu! Brass Numbers
- North American box art
- Developer: Laser Soft
- Publishers: JP: Laser Soft; NA: Renovation Products
- Producer: Masami Hanari
- Programmer: Hiroshi Ono
- Composer: Junta
- Platform: SNES
- Release: JP: November 20, 1992; NA: March 1993
- Genre: Fighting
- Modes: Single-player, multiplayer

Doomsday Warrior, known in Japan as Taiketsu!! Brass Numbers (対決！！ブラスナンバーズ, lit. "Confrontation!! Brass Numbers"), is a SNES fighting game developed and published by Telenet Japan's subsidiary Laser Soft in Japan on November 20, 1992 and later localized by Renovation Products in North America in March 1993. It was created during the fighting game trend of the 1990s that was popularized by Capcom's Street Fighter II.

Doomsday Warrior was added to the Nintendo Classics service in February 2021.

== Gameplay ==
The player takes the role of a member of the Doom Squad, a group of fighters who are under the influence of Main, a diabolical sorcerer (vengeful angel in Japan). The character the player chooses betrays the Doom Squad and battles for the people of Earth. To win, one's character must fight its former comrades of the Doom Squad. The player can choose which opponent to face after every battle. Ability Points are earned for winning each battle and are added to the character's current stats (Arm Power, Leg Power, Defense, Vitality, Soul Power).

== Characters ==
These 7 fighters are the Doom Squad, the warriors who serve Main. Except for Grimrock and Nuform, they are from different parts of Earth.

=== Sledge ===
Sledge (スレッジ Surejji) is a hot-tempered fighter and became the first warrior to betray the Doom Squad to protect Earth from Main.

=== Layban ===
Layban (レイバン Reiban) was a soldier in the military until he betrayed them to join the Doom Squad.

=== Amon ===
Amon (アモン Amon) is the muscle of the Doom Squad and is also the frontman of his heavy metal band.

=== Daisy ===
Daisy (デイジー Deijī) is a hybrid creature of half-woman and half-plant. Her origins are unknown.

=== P. Lump ===
P. Lump (ポポ・ランプ Popo Rampu) is an overweight martial artist who breathes fire and uses his long braid like a weapon.

=== Grimrock ===
Grimrock (グリムロック Gurimurokku) is a lizardman from an alien world, using his claws and tail to attack his enemies.

=== Nuform ===
Nuform (LC・38X Eru Shī Sanjūhachi Ekkusu) is a shapeless blob of liquid metal that can form a multitude of weapons for offense and shields for defense.

== Bosses ==
After the player's chosen fighter defeats the remaining Doom Squad members, that fighter then faces off against Main and his two henchmen in 3 back-to-back matches.

=== Shadow ===
Shadow (シャドー Shadō) is a shapeless creature of darkness that can mimic any fighter and the first opponent in the final battle. Shadow takes the form of the player's character during the battle and can use its moves against that character.

=== Ashura ===
Ashura (アシュラ Ashura) is Main's strongest warrior and the second opponent in the final battle. He resembles Ashura and has incredible strength and demonic energy.

=== Main ===
Main (ダーゼマイン Dāzemain) is the sorcerer who commands the Doom Squad and is the final boss. He flies in midair and uses lightning, fire, and light to attack, can generate a force field and shield, and wields a sword of light. After Main loses, he zooms into the sky and spares Earth and its people.

== Reception ==
Reception

Review score
Publication	Score
AllGame	3/5

Famitsu scored the game a 24 out of 40. Power Unlimited gave a review score of 75% and they criticized the game being a boring beat-em-up.
