= Sol-Feace =

1990 video game

- X68000 cover art
- Developer: Wolf Team
- Publisher: Telenet Japan: Sega CD Sega Genesis Renovation Products
- Composer: Motoi Sakuraba
- Platforms: X68000, Sega CD, Sega Genesis
- Release: X68000: JP: November 22, 1990; Sega CD: JP: December 12, 1991; NA: November 1992; PAL: April 2, 1993; Genesis: NA: March 1992
- Genre: Scrolling shooter
- Mode: Single-player

Sol-Feace (Note: Japanese: ソルフィース, Hepburn: Soru-Fīsu) is a 1990 horizontally scrolling shooter video game developed by Wolf Team and published by Telenet Japan for the X68000. Versions for the Sega CD and Sega Genesis were released later on, with the latter version renaming the game Sol-Deace. The player takes control of the titular starship as it must prevent a malfunctioning supercomputer from enslaving all of mankind. Gameplay involves shooting down enemies and avoiding projectiles, while collecting power capsules to increase the Sol-Feace's abilities. The Sol-Feace also has dual cannons that can fire shots diagonally.

The game's soundtrack was composed by Motoi Sakuraba, who would later work on the Tales series for Namco. Alongside Micronet's Heavy Nova, it was also one of the first launch titles for Sega CD in Japan, and was made as the console pack-in game in North America. Sol-Feace was met with mixed reviews from critics, who praised its fast-paced action, graphics and soundtrack but criticized its lack of originality and subpar quality compared to other similar games on the market. Sunsoft owns the rights to Sol-Feace after their acquisition of Telenet Japan's intellectual properties in 2009.

== Gameplay ==
X68000 version screenshot, showing the Sol-Feace fighting the first stage boss.

Sol-Feace is a horizontal-scrolling shooter. Controlling the titular starship, the player is tasked with preventing a malfunctioning supercomputer before it enslaves all of mankind. The objective of each stage is to destroy incoming enemies while avoiding their projectiles. The Sol-Feace has a pair of dual cannons that can be modified to either point forwards, backwards or diagonally, and can be arranged parallel to each other. Shooting small capsules will leave behind power-up items that upgrade the Sol-Feace's abilities when collected — these include homing missiles, a piercing laser, and a wide shot.

The game is composed of six stages, including mechanical bases, destroyed star vessels and the planet Jupiter — each of these end with a boss fight that must be defeated in order to progress. Each boss has a weak point that must be shot to inflict damage. The final stage has the player fighting against the supercomputer antagonist. Between stages are animated cutscenes that help explain the game's plot, with the Sega CD release giving these full voice acting.

== Development and release ==
Sol-Feace was originally released for the X68000 home computer on November 22, 1990. It was developed by Japanese studio Wolf Team and published by their parent company, Telenet Japan. Music for the game was composed by Motoi Sakuraba, who later helped work on the Tales series for Namco. It was ported to the Sega CD in 1991 as one of the console's first launch titles in Japan, alongside Micronet's Heavy Nova, and was made the pack-in game for the North American release — the latter version was published internationally by Sega. A Genesis cartridge version was released in 1992 and published by Renovation Products, renaming the game to Sol-Deace. The rights to Sol-Feace are owned by Sunsoft, following their acquisition of Telenet Japan's intellectual properties in 2009.

== Reception ==
Reception

Review scores
| Publication | Score |
|---|---|
| AllGame | 3/5 |
| Computer and Video Games | 89% |
| Wizard | C+ |

Sol-Feace was met with mixed reviews from critics; while some praised the game's visuals, fast-paced gameplay and soundtrack, others criticized its lack of originality and for being subpar compared to other shoot'em up titles available.

Computer and Video Games magazine criticized the gameplay for lacking originality, unfavorably comparing it to games such as Hellfire and Gynoug, adding that much of the game's mechanics and features were done better on other Sega Genesis games beforehand. Wizard stated it offered nothing new to the shoot 'em up genre, while Retro Gamer said it was a "below par" launch game for the console, saying it was simply the Genesis version with a new CD soundtrack "tacked-on". GamePro wrote for the Sega Genesis release that the power-up items weren't as impressive as those in titles such as Thunder Force III, while also disliking the game's short length. In a retrospective review, AllGame disliked the sound effects for being mediocre and its music for being average.

In a more positive light, Electronic Games called the Sega CD conversion a "solid side-scrolling shooter" for its sound effects, graphics and fast action-based gameplay, adding that Sega should be commended for making the game a pack-in for the peripheral. GamePro liked the Sega Genesis version's detailed visuals and pumping soundtrack, as well as its stage designs. They also wrote that the game could be a contender for a "shoot'em up award" had it existed in the magazine. Computer and Video Games stated that the Sega CD version was not a "total waste of money", complementing its sound effects, fast speed, music and cutscenes, while AllGame thought the version's dual-cannon mechanic was an interesting gameplay concept. AllGame also praised its frantic gameplay and colorful visuals, concluding that it was worth trying out at the very least.
