= List of Tales media =

The Tales series, known in Japan as the Tales of series (「テイルズ オブ」シリーズ, "Teiruzu Obu" Shirīzu), is a franchise of fantasy Japanese role-playing video games published by Bandai Namco Games (formerly Namco), and developed by its subsidiary, Namco Tales Studio (formerly Wolf Team) until 2011 and presently by Bandai Namco. First begun in 1995 with the development and release of Tales of Phantasia for the Super Famicom, the series currently spans twenty-eight main titles, multiple spin-off games and supplementary media in the form of manga series, anime series, and audio dramas.

While entries in the series generally stand independent of each other with different characters and stories, they are commonly linked by their gameplay, themes and high fantasy settings. Most of the main Tales games have been localized for North America and Europe, although almost all of the spinoff titles have not been released abroad. While generally seen as a niche series in English speaking regions, Tales is considered a high-profile property in Japan, just behind other series such as Final Fantasy and Dragon Quest. As of 2024, the series has shipped over 30 million copies.

== Video games ==
In 2007, series producer Makoto Yoshizumi defined two classes of Tales games, "Mothership Titles" and "Escort Titles". "Mothership" essentially means "Main series", where as "Escort" essentially means "Spinoff". In 2020, a different internal organization scheme was announced; "Original" for games featuring new stories as well as their sequels, and "Crossover" for secondary entries drawing characters and worlds from various past titles. The games are also frequently given what is called a "Characteristic Genre Name", which is a short subtitle or phrase that outlines the game's overall theme. There are also terms that are used in remakes or ports of games: "R" stands for "remake" or "re-imagination" (as in Hearts R), while "F" in Graces F stands for "future", in reference to the game's extra story content.

=== Original Titles ===
Title	Original release date		
Title	Japan	North America	PAL region
Tales of Phantasia	December 15, 1995	March 6, 2006 (Game Boy Advance)	March 31, 2006 (Game Boy Advance)
Notes: Released on Super Famicom; Developed by Wolf Team; Also available on PlayStation (1998), Game Boy Advance (2003), PlayStation Portable (as Tales of Phantasia: Full Voice Edition, 2006), mobile phones (as Tales of Phantasia Mobile, 2010), and iOS (2014); Included in Tales of Phantasia: Narikiri Dungeon X (as Tales of Phantasia X, PlayStation Portable, 2010); PlayStation and Game Boy Advance versions are a full remake with updated graphics and gameplay, PlayStation Portable version added fully voiced cutscenes; Characteristic genre name not present for original, set as Legendary RPG (伝説のRPG, Densetsu no RPG) for PlayStation version and Game Boy Advance port, and as Legendary RPG, Embellished With Voices (声が彩る、伝説のRPG, Koe ga irodoru, densetsu no RPG) for PlayStation Portable version
Tales of Destiny	December 23, 1997	September 30, 1998	none
Notes: Released on PlayStation; Developed by Wolf Team; Also available for PlayStation 2 (2006) and as Director's Cut for PlayStation 2 (2008); PlayStation 2 version is a full remake with updated graphics and gameplay; Characteristic genre name is RPG of Destiny (運命のRPG, Unmei no RPG), changed to RPG Called Destiny (運命という名のRPG, Unmei to iu na no RPG) for remake and to One More RPG Called Destiny (もうひとつの運命という名のRPG, Mou hitotsu no unmei to iu na no RPG) for the Director's Cut
Tales of Phantasia: Narikiri Dungeon	November 10, 2000	None	None
Notes: Released on Game Boy Color.; Spin-off sequel to Tales of Phantasia.; Remake for PlayStation Portable (titled Tales of Phantasia: Narikiri Dungeon X) was released in 2010.; Genre of PlayStation Portable remake is RPG to Face Reality (真実に向き合うRPG, Shinjitsu ni mukiau RPG).; PlayStation Portable version is a full remake with updated graphics and gameplay, voices, and additional content.; PlayStation Portable version includes enhanced port of Tales of Phantasia (titled Tales of Phantasia: Cross Edition).; Original developed by Telenet Japan, remake developed by Namco Tales Studio.
Tales of Eternia	November 30, 2000	September 10, 2001	February 10, 2006 (PlayStation Portable)
Notes: Released on PlayStation; Known as Tales of Destiny II in North America; Developed by Wolf Team; Also available for PlayStation Portable (2005); Port added extra cutscenes; Characteristic genre name is RPG of Eternity and Bonds (永遠と絆のRPG, Eien to kizuna no RPG)
Tales of Destiny 2	November 28, 2002	none	none
Notes: Released on PlayStation 2; Developed by Wolf Team; Also available for PlayStation Portable (2007); Characteristic genre name is RPG to Release Destiny (運命を解き放つRPG, Unmei o tokihanatsu RPG)
Tales of the World: Summoner's Lineage	March 7, 2003	None	None
Notes: Released on Game Boy Advance.; Spin-off sequel to Tales of Phantasia.; Developed by Kaga Tech.; Characteristic Genre name is Fantasy Simulation RPG (ファンタジーシミュレーションRPG, Fantajī shimyurēshon RPG)
Tales of Symphonia	August 29, 2003	July 13, 2004	November 19, 2004
Notes: Released on GameCube; Developed by Namco Tales Studio; Also available for PlayStation 2 (2004) and PlayStation 3 (as part of Tales of Symphonia Chronicles collection, 2014); A PC version of the game was released in early 2016 (via Steam); A remastered version of the game was released on Nintendo Switch, PlayStation 4, and Xbox One in 2023; Characteristic genre name is RPG That Resonates With You (君と響きあうRPG, Kimi to hibikiau RPG)
Tales of Rebirth	December 16, 2004	none	none
Notes: Released on PlayStation 2; Developed by Namco Tales Studio; Also available for PlayStation Portable (2008); Characteristic genre name is RPG Where You Will Be Reborn (君が生まれ変わるRPG, Kimi ga umarekawaru RPG)
Tales of Breaker	January 31, 2005	None	None
Notes: Released on DoCoMo, FOMA, au, and WIN.; Developed by team Tales of Mobile composed of members of Namco Tales Studio.; First game to have a solo female protagonist.
Tales of Legendia	August 25, 2005	February 7, 2006	none
Notes: Released on PlayStation 2; Developed by Namco Tales Studio; Characteristic genre name is RPG Where Bonds Spin Legends (絆が伝説を紡ぎだすRPG, Kizuna ga densetsu o tsumugidasu RPG)
Tales of Commons	October 14, 2005	None	None
Notes: Released on DoCoMo and FOMA.; Developed by team Tales of Mobile composed of members of Namco Tales Studio.; Characteristic genre name is RPG to Walk Alongside a Changing World and Trusting Thoughts (変わりゆく世界 信じる想い 共に歩んでゆくRPG, Kawari yuku sekai shinjiru omoi tomo ni ayunde yuku RPG)
Tales of the Abyss	December 15, 2005	October 10, 2006	November 25, 2011 (Nintendo 3DS)
Notes: Released on PlayStation 2; Developed by Namco Tales Studio; Also available for Nintendo 3DS (2011); Characteristic genre name is RPG to Discover the Meaning of Life (生まれた意味を知るRPG, Umareta imi o shiru RPG)
Tales of Eternia Online	March 3, 2006	None	None
Notes: Released on PC.; Developed by Dwango.; MMORPG.; Service ended on March 31, 2007.
Tales of Wahrheit	June 15, 2006	None	None
Notes: Released on DoCoMo and FOMA.; Developed by team Tales of Mobile composed of members of Namco Tales Studio.; Characteristic genre name is RPG To Find the Meaning of Living (生きる意味を見つけるRPG, Ikiru imi o mitsukeru RPG)
Tales of the Tempest	October 26, 2006	None	None
Notes: Released on Nintendo DS.; Developed by Dimps.; Characteristic genre name is RPG that Awakens the Soul (魂を呼び覚ますRPG, Tamashii o yobisamasu RPG)
Tales of Innocence	December 6, 2007	none	none
Notes: Released on Nintendo DS; Developed by Alfa System; Also available for PlayStation Vita (as Tales of Innocence R, 2012); Characteristic genre name is RPG to Tie Thoughts Together (想いを繋ぐRPG, Omoi o tsunagu RPG)
Tales of the World: Material Dungeon	January 31, 2008	None	None
Notes: Released on DoCoMo and FOMA.; Developed by team Tales of Mobile composed of members of Namco Tales Studio.; Characteristic genre name is Outfit Change RPG (着せ替えRPG, Kisekae RPG)
Tales of Symphonia: Dawn of the New World	June 26, 2008	November 11, 2008	November 12, 2009
Notes: Released on Wii.; Spin-off sequel to Tales of Symphonia.; Developed by Namco Tales Studio.; Characteristic genre name is RPG to Believe in Resonating Hearts (響き合う心を信じるRPG, Hibiki au kokoro o shinjiru RPG)
Tales of Vesperia	August 7, 2008	August 26, 2008	June 26, 2009
Notes: Released on Xbox 360; Developed by Namco Tales Studio; Also available for PlayStation 3 in 2009; The Definitive edition was released for the PlayStation 4, Xbox One, Nintendo Switch and PC (Steam) in 2019; Characteristic genre name is RPG to Enforce "Justice" (「正義」を貫き通すRPG, "Seigi" o tsuranukitōsu RPG)
Tales of Hearts	December 18, 2008	November 11, 2014 (PlayStation Vita)	November 14, 2014 (PlayStation Vita)
Notes: Released on Nintendo DS; Developed by Namco Tales Studio; Released in two editions: "Anime Edition" and "CG Movie Edition", with different styles of cutscenes; Also available for PlayStation Vita (as Tales of Hearts R, 2013); PlayStation Vita version is a full remake with updated graphics and gameplay; Characteristic genre name is RPG to Meet the Heart (心と出会うRPG, Kokoro to deau RPG)
Tales of Graces	December 10, 2009	March 13, 2012 (PlayStation 3)	August 31, 2012 (PlayStation 3)
Notes: Released on Wii; Developed by Namco Tales Studio; Also available for PlayStation 3 (as Tales of Graces F, 2010); Characteristic genre name is RPG to Discover the Strength to Protect (守る強さを知るRPG, Mamoru tsuyosa o shiru RPG)
Tales of Xillia	September 8, 2011	August 6, 2013	August 9, 2013
Notes: Released on PlayStation 3; Developed by Namco Tales Studio; Characteristic genre name is RPG of Unwavering Convictions (揺るぎなき信念のRPG, Yuruginaki shinnen no RPG)
Tales of Xillia 2	November 1, 2012	August 19, 2014	August 22, 2014
Notes: Released on PlayStation 3; Developed by Bandai Namco Games; Characteristic genre name is RPG where Choices Spin the Future (選択が未来を紡ぐRPG, Sentaku ga Mirai o Tsumugu RPG)
Tales of Zestiria	January 22, 2015	October 20, 2015	October 16, 2015
Notes: Released on PlayStation 3; Developed by Bandai Namco Games; Localized for PlayStation 3, as well as PlayStation 4, and PC (via Steam); Characteristic genre name is RPG of Passion that Illuminates the World (世界を点灯情熱のRPG, Sekai o tentō jōnetsu no RPG)
Tales of Berseria	August 18, 2016	January 24, 2017	January 27, 2017
Notes: Released on PlayStation 3, PlayStation 4, and PC; Developed by Bandai Namco Games; Characteristic genre name is RPG of Discovering your Own Reason to Live (君が君らしく生きるためのRPG, Kimi ga kimirashiku ikiru tame no RPG)
Tales of Crestoria	July 15, 2020	July 15, 2020	July 15, 2020
Notes: Released on Android and iOS.; Developed by Bandai Namco Entertainment Inc.; and KLab: Characteristic genre name is An RPG Written in Blood and Betrayal (愛しき咎我人（なかま）と出会うＲＰＧ, Itoshiki Togabito Nakama to Deau RPG; Meeting Dear Transgressors (Friends) RPG); Japanese and Global servers were shut down on February 7, 2022.
Tales of Arise	September 9, 2021	September 10, 2021	September 10, 2021
Notes: Released on PC, PlayStation 4, PlayStation 5, Xbox One, and Xbox Series X/S.; Developed by Bandai Namco Entertainment.; Characteristic genre name: RPG of Challenging the Fate That Binds You (君をつなぐ運命への挑戦のRPG, Kimi o tsunagu unmei e no chōsen no RPG).
Tales of Luminaria	November 4, 2021	November 5, 2021	November 5, 2021
Notes: Released on Android and iOS.; Developed by Bandai Namco Entertainment Inc. and COLOPL.; Characteristic genre name is "21 Ways of Life Intersecting RPG" (２１の生き様が交錯するＲＰＧ, 21 no Ikizama ga Kousakusuru RPG); Game servers were shut down on July 19, 2022.

=== Crossover titles and Spin offs ===
==== Tales of the World, Narikiri Dungeon, Radiant Mythology ====
Games that are a part of the Tales of the World, Narikiri Dungeon, and/or Radiant Mythology series.

Game	Original release date			Characteristic Genre Name
Game	Japan	North America	PAL region	Characteristic Genre Name
Tales of the World: Narikiri Dungeon 2	October 25, 2002	None	None	Cosplay RPG (コスプレRPG, Kosupure RPG)
Notes: Released on Game Boy Advance.; Developed by Alfa System.
Tales of the World: Narikiri Dungeon 3	January 6, 2005	None	None	Cosplay S-RPG (コスプレS-RPG, Kosupure S-RPG)
Notes: Released on Game Boy Advance.; Developed by Alfa System.
Tales of the World: Radiant Mythology	December 21, 2006	July 17, 2007	September 7, 2007	RPG For Your Sake (きみのためのRPG, Kimi no tame no RPG)
Notes: Released on PlayStation Portable.; Developed by Alfa System.
Tales of the World: Radiant Mythology 2	January 29, 2009	None	None	RPG For Your Sake (君のためのRPG, Kimi no tame no RPG)
Notes: Released on PlayStation Portable.; Developed by Alfa System.
Tales of the World: Radiant Mythology 3	February 10, 2011	None	None	RPG For Your Sake (君のためのRPG, Kimi no tame no RPG)
Notes: Released on PlayStation Portable.; Developed by Alfa System.
Tales of the World: Dice Adventure	April 26, 2012	None	None	None
Notes: Released on Web browser.; Developed by Namco Bandai Games.
Tales of the World: Tactics Union	July 2, 2012	None	None	None
Notes: Released on Android and iOS.; Developed by Namco Bandai Games.
Tales of the World: Reve Unitia	October 23, 2014	None	None	None
Notes: Released on Nintendo 3DS.; Developed by Namco Bandai Games.

==== Compilations ====
Game	Original release date			Characteristic Genre Name
Game	Japan	North America	PAL region	Characteristic Genre Name
Tales of Symphonia Chronicles	October 10, 2013	February 25, 2014	February 28, 2014	None
Notes: Released on PlayStation 3.; Contains both the PlayStation 2 version of Tales of Symphonia and its sequel Tales of Symphonia: Dawn of the New World.

==== Non-RPG Spin-off ====
Games that are not of the role-playing game genre but features characters and settings from the Tales series.

Game	Original release date			Characteristic Genre Name
Game	Japan	North America	PAL region	Characteristic Genre Name
Tales of VS.	August 6, 2009	None	None	N/A
Notes: Released on PlayStation Portable.; Crossover Fighting game featuring 35 characters from 13 past games from the Tales series.; Contains an additional mini-game called Tales of Wallbreaker which features traditional 2D gameplay with additional characters not featured in the main game.; Developed by Matrix Software.
Game	Original release date			Characteristic Genre Name
Game	Japan	North America	PAL region	Characteristic Genre Name
Tales of the Heroes: Twin Brave	February 23, 2012	None	None	N/A
Notes: Released on PlayStation Portable.; Crossover Action Beat 'em up video game featuring 33 characters from 15 past games from the Tales series.; Developed by Namco Bandai Games and Alfa System.

==== Fan Disk ====
Game	Original release date			Characteristic Genre Name
Game	Japan	North America	PAL region	Characteristic Genre Name
Tales of Fandom Vol.1	January 31, 2002	None	None	None
Notes: Released on PlayStation.; Developed by Namco.
Tales of Fandom Vol.2	June 28, 2007	None	None	None
Notes: Released on PlayStation 2.; Developed by Namco Bandai Games.

==== Tales of Mobile ====
Game	Original release date			Characteristic Genre Name
Game	Japan	North America	PAL region	Characteristic Genre Name
Tales of Tactics	February 16, 2004	None	None	None
Notes: Released on DoCoMo, FOMA, au, and WIN.
Tales of Tactics Gaiden	November 16, 2005	None	None	None
Notes: Released on DoCoMo and FOMA.

==== Other Mobile Titles ====
Title	Original release date		
Title	Japan	North America	PAL region
Tales of Kizna	November 22, 2011	None	None
Notes: Characteristic genre name is "RPG of Forging Connections" (絆つながるＲＰＧ).; Developed by KLabGames.; Game servers shut down on September 25, 2014.

Title	Original release date		
Title	Japan	North America	PAL region
Tales of Link	March 3, 2014	April 5, 2016	None
Notes: Developed by Bandai Namco Games; and Akatsuki Inc.: Game servers shut down on March 28, 2018.

Title	Original release date		
Title	Japan	North America	PAL region
Tales of Asteria	April 4, 2014	None	None
Notes: Characteristic genre name is RPG That Ties Together Intersecting Thoughts (交差する想いが繋がる, Kousa Suru Omoi ga Tsunagaru RPG).; Developed by KLab.; Game servers shut down on May 18, 2023.

Title	Original release date		
Title	Japan	North America	PAL region
Tales of the Rays	February 28, 2017	July 24, 2017	July 24, 2017
Notes: Characteristic genre name is An RPG About Pursuing the Power of Truth (真実の強さを追うＲＰＧ, Shinjitsu no Tsuyosa o Ou RPG).; Developed by Bandai Namco Games.; Game servers shut down on May 29, 2018 (WW) and July 23, 2024 (JP).

==== Others ====
Game	Original release date			Characteristic Genre Name
Game	Japan	North America	PAL region	Characteristic Genre Name
Keroro RPG: Kishi to Musha to Densetsu no Kaizoku	March 4, 2010	None	None	None
Notes: Released on Nintendo DS.; Spin-off of the Tales Series based on the Sgt. Frog Franchise.; Developed by Namco Tales Studio.

== Other media ==
=== Anime ===
Title	Original Run		
Title	Japan	North America	PAL region
Tales of Eternia: The Animation	January 8, 2001 – March 26, 2001	None	None
Notes: Loosely based on game.
Tales of Phantasia: The Animation	November 25, 2004 – February 24, 2006	January 16, 2007	None
Notes: OVA.; Released on DVD and VHS in 2004.; Released on Blu-ray Disc in 2008.
Tales of Symphonia: The Animation	June 8, 2007 – October 23, 2012	None	None
Notes: OVA.
Tales of the Abyss	October 4, 2008 – March 28, 2009	October 11, 2011	None
Notes: Released on DVD, Blu-ray Disc, and UMD in 2009.
Tales of Vesperia: The First Strike	October 3, 2009	June 26, 2012	January 7, 2011
Notes: Theatrical release.; Released on DVD, Blu-ray Disc, and UMD in 2010.; Prequel to Tales of Vesperia.; Features many new characters as well as returning ones.
Tales of Zestiria the X	July 3, 2016 – April 29, 2017	Simulcast Streaming	Simulcast Streaming

=== Radio ===
Title	Original Run		
Title	Japan	North America	PAL region
Tales Ring	N/A	None	None
Tales of the Radio	N/A	None	None
