= Panasonic Eluga P =

Android smartphone

ELUGA P P-03E
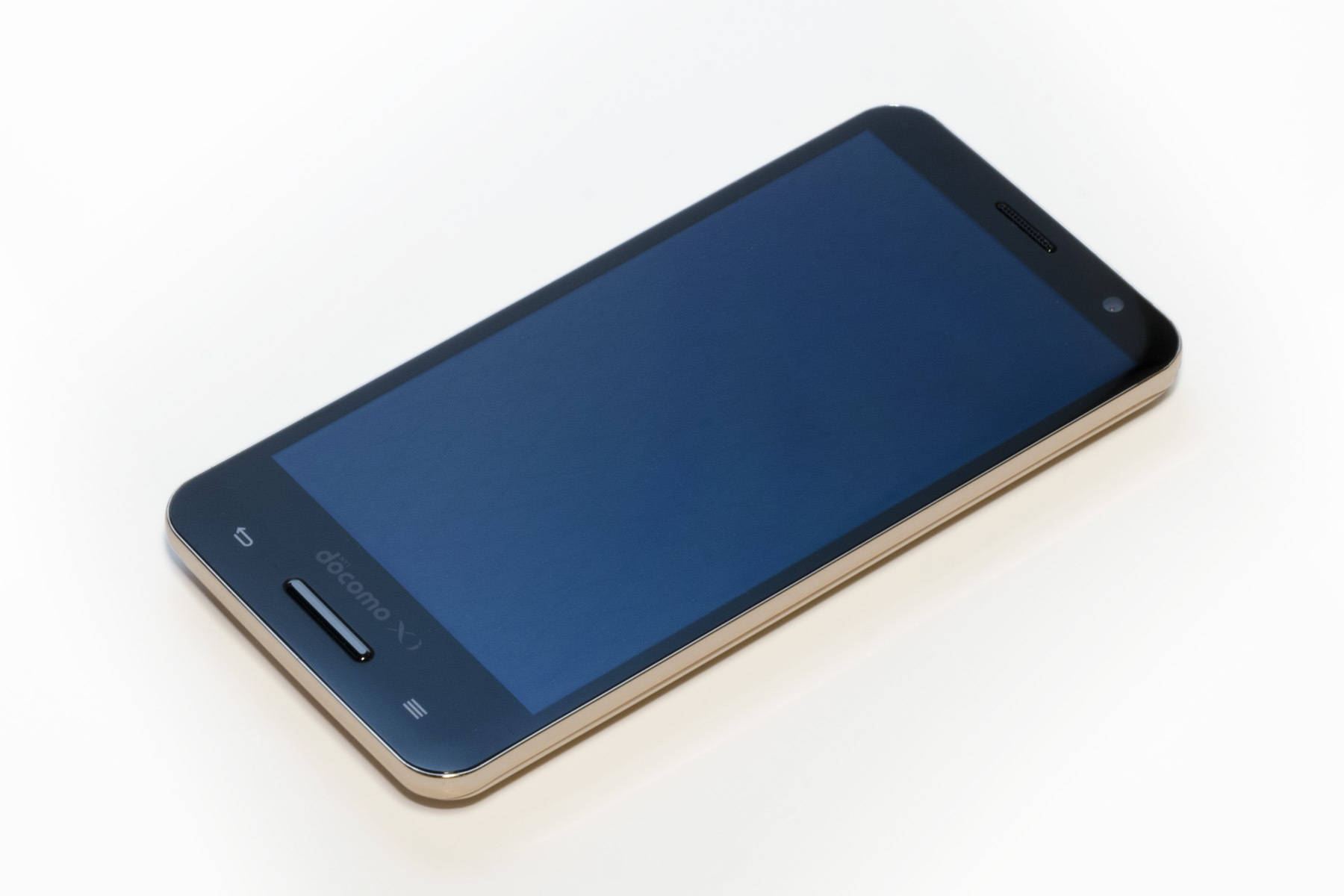
- Front view of the P-03E (Gold)
- Brand: NTT Docomo
- Manufacturer: Panasonic Mobile Communications
- Type: Smartphone
- Family: ELUGA
- First released: June 15, 2013; 13 years ago
- Predecessor: ELUGA X P-02E
- Compatible networks: 3G: FOMA (W-CDMA); 2G: GSM; 3.9G: Xi
- Form factor: Slate
- Colors: Gold; Black
- Dimensions: 132 mm (5.2 in) H 65 mm (2.6 in) W 10.9 mm (0.43 in) D
- Weight: 146 g (5.1 oz)
- Operating system: Android 4.2
- System-on-chip: Qualcomm Snapdragon 600 APQ8064T
- CPU: 1.7 GHz quad-core
- Memory: 2 GB RAM
- Storage: 32 GB (approx. 23.1 GB available for user data)
- Removable storage: microSD (up to 2 GB) microSDHC (up to 32 GB) microSDXC (up to 64 GB)
- Battery: 2,600 mAh
- Charging: Wireless charging (Qi)
- Rear camera: 13.4 MP CMOS SmartFSI
- Front camera: 1.3 MP CMOS
- Display: 4.7-inch TFT LCD, Full HD (1920×1080 pixels), 469 ppi, approx. 16.77 million colors
- Model: P-03E

The Docomo Smartphone ELUGA P P-03E is an Android smartphone developed and manufactured by Panasonic Mobile Communications for NTT Docomo, supporting 3.9G (Xi) and 3G (FOMA) networks. It is part of the second-generation Docomo Smartphone series.

== History ==
- May 15, 2013 – Announced by NTT Docomo.
- June 8, 2013 – Pre-orders began.
- June 15, 2013 – Released to the market.

== Specifications ==
Rear panel view

The device's user interface includes "Fit Home," an ELUGA-exclusive one-handed UI carried over from the P-02E, "Keitai Mode," which mimics a traditional feature phone menu, and Docomo's standard "docomo Palette UI." Additionally, it introduces "docomo Simple UI," a new layout designed specifically for users transitioning from a traditional feature phone to a smartphone for the first time.

The ELUGA P P-03E is the successor to the P-02E and features a 4.7-inch liquid crystal display, making it one of the smallest domestic smartphones equipped with a Full HD display.

The camera system utilizes a newly developed SmartFSI CMOS sensor, high color-rendering LED flash, and the Mobile VenusEngine, achieving high-resolution image capture, noise reduction, and color reproduction comparable to dedicated digital cameras. The main camera features a f/2.0 lens aperture to improve low-light performance. In terms of video output, while the P-02E only supported wireless output via Miracast, the P-03E supports both Miracast and MHL wired output. However, it does not support full-seg TV broadcast reception.

In addition to Google standard applications, the software suite includes proprietary manufacturer applications such as ELUGA Link, Polaris Office, Psmart, Osaifu-Keitai, Personal Protect, and Panasonic Smart.

On September 26, 2013, Panasonic announced the suspension of its smartphone business in Japan, making the ELUGA P P-03E the final smartphone model produced by Panasonic for NTT Docomo.

== Known issues ==
- June 19, 2013, update: Fixed an issue where a pop-up window indicating the forced closure of "docomo Simple UI" might appear after starting up the phone. Updated the build number from 10.0971 to 10.0975.
- August 22, 2013, update: Fixed an issue where background noise could be heard by the other party during a call under specific environments. Updated the build number from 10.0971 and 10.0975 to 10.0992.
- January 21, 2014, update: Fixed an issue where tapping the Docomo Mail icon while the home screen was set to Keitai Mode might fail to launch the application. Updated the build number from 10.0971, 10.0975, and 10.0992 to 10.1010.
