= LG Optimus it =

Android smartphone manufactured by LG

LG Optimus it L-05D
- Manufacturer: LG Electronics
- Series: Optimus
- First released: 30 June 2012; 14 years ago
- Compatible networks: NTT DoCoMo (3G/FOMA, LTE/Xi, GSM)
- Form factor: Bar
- Colors: White; Black; Pink; Purple
- Dimensions: 124 mm (4.9 in) H 62 mm (2.4 in) W 10 mm (0.39 in) D
- Weight: 131 g (4.6 oz)
- Operating system: Android 4.0.4 (Ice Cream Sandwich), upgradable to 4.1.2 (Jelly Bean)
- CPU: 1.5 GHz dual-core Qualcomm Snapdragon S4 (MSM8960)
- Memory: 1 GB RAM
- Storage: 8 GB
- Removable storage: microSD (up to 2 GB), microSDHC (up to 32 GB)
- Battery: 1650 mAh
- Rear camera: 8.2 MP, CMOS, autofocus, LED flash, aperture f/2.4
- Front camera: 0.32 MP, CMOS, aperture f/2.8
- Display: 4 inches, 480 x 800 pixels (WVGA), IPS LCD, 16.77 million colors
- Connectivity: Wi-Fi (802.11 b/g/n), Bluetooth 4.0, micro-USB, 3.5 mm headphone jack, FeliCa, Infrared

The LG/docomo with series Optimus it L-O5D is a FOMA (3G) and Xi (3.9G) Android mobile phones manufactured and designed by the Korean mobile phones company LG Electronics.

Part of the docomo with series, it was announced on May 16, 2012, along with 18 phone models and available on June 22 as pre-orders. NTT Docomo announced that the Optimus it will release on June 30.

== Specifications ==
The L-05D is powered by a 1.5GHz dual-core Qualcomm Snapdragon S4 "MSM8960" chipset.

The L-05D was housed by a 4-inch IPS LCD display with a resolution of 480 x 800 pixels and also includes the latest features beyond NOTTV. It includes OneSeg, waterproofing, mobile payment, and infrared communication.

The smartphone includes an 8.2-megapixel CMOS sensor with HDR. A camera feature includes a "Time Catch Shot" camera interval up to 0.25 seconds.

The smartphone runs on Android 4.0.4 Ice Cream and upgradeable to Android 4.1.2 Jelly Bean.

On July 17, 2013, a minor software was launched to fix notification sound issues on social media apps.
