= Sharp Aquos Phone EX SH-04E =

AQUOS PHONE EX SH-04E
- Brand: docomo with series
- Manufacturer: Sharp
- Type: Smartphone
- Series: AQUOS PHONE
- First released: January 25, 2013
- Predecessor: AQUOS PHONE si SH-01E
- Compatible networks: 3G: FOMA (W-CDMA); 2G: GSM; Data: 3.9G (Xi), 3G (HSDPA, HSUPA), 2G (GSM), Wi-Fi (IEEE 802.11b/g/n)
- Form factor: Slate
- Colors: Pink; Black; White
- Dimensions: 128 mm (5.0 in) H 64 mm (2.5 in) W 10.9 mm (0.43 in) D
- Weight: 145 g (5.1 oz)
- Operating system: Android 4.1.2
- System-on-chip: Qualcomm Snapdragon S4 Pro APQ8064
- CPU: 1.5 GHz quad-core
- GPU: Adreno 320
- Memory: 2 GB RAM
- Storage: 16 GB ROM (approx. 11.6 GB user accessible)
- Removable storage: microSD (up to 2 GB), microSDHC (up to 32 GB), microSDXC (up to 64 GB)
- SIM: docomo Pink miniUIM
- Battery: 2,000 mAh
- Charging: Qi wireless charging
- Rear camera: 13.1 MP back-illuminated CMOS, optical image stabilization, facial recognition, voice-activated shutter
- Front camera: 1.2 MP back-illuminated CMOS
- Display: 4.5 in (110 mm) S-CG Silicon TFT LCD, HD (1280 × 720 pixels), 16,777,216 colors
- Model: SH-04E

The docomo with series AQUOS PHONE EX SH-04E is a dual-mode smartphone developed by Sharp Corporation for NTT Docomo, supporting both 3.9G (Xi) and 3G (FOMA) networks as part of the docomo with series.

== History ==
- January 22, 2013 – Announced by NTT Docomo.
- January 23, 2013 – Pre-orders opened.
- January 25, 2013 – Officially released for sale.

== Specifications ==
=== Hardware ===
The AQUOS PHONE EX SH-04E serves as the virtual successor to the AQUOS PHONE si SH-01E, maintaining a focus on female users while expanding in size and significantly upgrading performance with a quad-core processor. Aside from its display resolution and battery capacity, its specifications rival contemporary flagship smartphones released during the same period.

The smartphone is housed by a 4.5-inch "HD S-CG Silicon LCD" display. The device features narrow bezels that keep the total width to 64 mm, which combined with a slightly curved back cover.

The bottom section of the phone features customizable multi-color illumination lighting with adjustable patterns, reminiscent of traditional Japanese feature phones.

The device is powered by a 2,000 mAh removable battery. While the capacity itself is modest, Sharp's energy-saving display technology allows for extended talk times, complemented by the customizable "Eco-技" (Eco Technique) battery-saving software. The smartphone and its standalone battery support Qi wireless charging.

It features a 13.1-megapixel rear-facing back-illuminated CMOS camera with optical and electronic image stabilizations and a 1.2-megapixel front-facing back-illuminated CMOS sensor.

For contactless features, the phone supports NFC payments (Type A/B) via the docomo Pink miniUIM card. Standard feature set incorporates FeliCa/Osaifu-Keitai, One Seg TV tuning, Bluetooth 4.0, infrared communication, and GPS.

Unlike the AQUOS PHONE ZETA SH-02E, this model does not support NOTTV, 5 GHz Wi-Fi (IEEE 802.11a/n), or Sharp's IGZO display technology, but conversely features a removable battery and Qi wireless charging support.

=== Software ===
The smartphone runs on Android 4.1.2 with Japanese input powered by iWnn.

Pre-installed applications include "Bijin Make Navi", co-developed by Sharp and Shiseido, which uses the front-facing camera to apply virtual makeup using Shiseido's "MAQuillAGE" cosmetics brand directly on screen.

== Known issues ==
May 29, 2013, update

- Fixes an issue where switching to the front camera and using the self-timer would cause the camera application to crash.
- Updated build numbers from 01.00.01 or 01.00.02 to 01.00.03.

February 25, 2013, update

- Fixes an issue where the display screen would remain lit continuously after touch interaction.
- Fixes a rare issue where file downloads via the web browser would fail.

June 27, 2013, update

- Fixes an issue where pressing the send button in the messaging app while in landscape mode failed to send SMS messages.
- Updated build numbers from 01.00.01, 01.00.02, or 01.00.03 to 01.00.04.

February 17, 2014, update

- Fixes an issue where the phone would rarely restart automatically when left idle with the screen off.
- Fixes an issue where a inserted microSD card would cause repeated "microSD card unexpectedly removed" notifications despite being fully functional.
- Updated build numbers from 01.00.01, 01.00.02, 01.00.03, or 01.00.04 to 01.00.06.

October 31, 2014, update

- Fixes an issue where internet connection failures could occur under certain Wi-Fi environments.
- Updated build numbers from 01.00.01, 01.00.02, 01.00.03, 01.00.04, or 01.00.06 to 01.00.08.
