= FOMA P901iS =

- Brand: NTT DoCoMo
- Manufacturer: Panasonic Mobile Communications
- Type: 3G mobile phone
- Series: FOMA
- First released: June 10, 2005; 21 years ago
- Predecessor: P901i
- Compatible networks: FOMA (W-CDMA) 800 MHz, 2 GHz
- Form factor: Clamshell
- Colors: Red × Dimple; Black × Smoke; Silver × GEKKA
- Dimensions: 102 mm (4.0 in) H 49 mm (1.9 in) W 25 mm (0.98 in) D
- Weight: 115 g (4.1 oz) (without outer jacket); 120 g (4.2 oz) (with outer jacket)
- Removable storage: miniSD card (up to 256 MB)
- Rear camera: Approx. 2.02 MP νMaicovicon
- Front camera: Approx. 0.1 MP CMOS
- Display: Main: 2.2 in (56 mm) TFT LCD, 240x320 pixels (QVGA), approx. 260,000 colors Sub: 0.8 in (20 mm) OLED, 96×25 pixels, blue mono
- Model: P901iS

The FOMA P901iS is a 3G mobile phone handset developed by Panasonic Mobile Communications for NTT DoCoMo's FOMA network.

== History ==
On March 31, 2005, the device was certified by the Telecom Engineering Center (TELEC) and passed the Japan Approvals Institute for Telecommunications Equipment (JATE). NTT DoCoMo officially announced the handset in a press release alongside the N901iS, D901iS, F901iS, and SH901iS on May 17, 2005. The device was subsequently released to the market on June 10, 2005.

== Specifications ==
=== Hardware ===
The handset was released following the SH901iS as part of the 901iS series, launching simultaneously with the F901iS and D901iS. It supports miniSD card expansion up to 256 MB as officially specified by DoCoMo, displaying an incompatibility message if a card exceeding 256 MB is inserted.

=== Camera ===
The rear camera features an approximate 2.02-megapixel νMaicovicon sensor without autofocus support, while the front camera intended primarily for video calls uses an approximate 100,000-pixel CMOS image sensor.

The flip-style device incorporates a blue-illuminated sub-display on the rear exterior, accompanied by green dot LEDs that can display customizable light animations, while the keypad keys illuminate in yellow-green. Following its predecessor, the P901i, it supports interchangeable custom jackets and introduces a facial recognition system—a first for a mobile phone.

=== Connectivity ===
Standard features shared across the 901iS series include support for i-mode FeliCa, dual-band compatibility with the 800 MHz "FOMA Plus-Area", the ability to switch between voice calls and video calls with other 901iS-compatible models, and a PC document viewer function capable of reading and downloading PDF files. The device also supports automatic time correction based on clock data received from DoCoMo's network.

=== Software ===
The phone supports SD-Audio playback in AAC format. It comes pre-installed with several i-applications (i-appli), including Final Fantasy II, BombLink2 Surround, Jacket Coordinator, Dot Creator, TRANCE PINBALL SURROUND, InfoScreen, and G-Guide Program Guide Remote Control.

== Known issues ==
NTT DoCoMo issued software updates via their official website to fix system issues on the following dates:

- June 27, 2005: Software update notice for P901iS.
- October 11, 2005: Software update notice for P901iS.
