= Fujitsu Arrows X F-02E =

ARROWS X F-02E
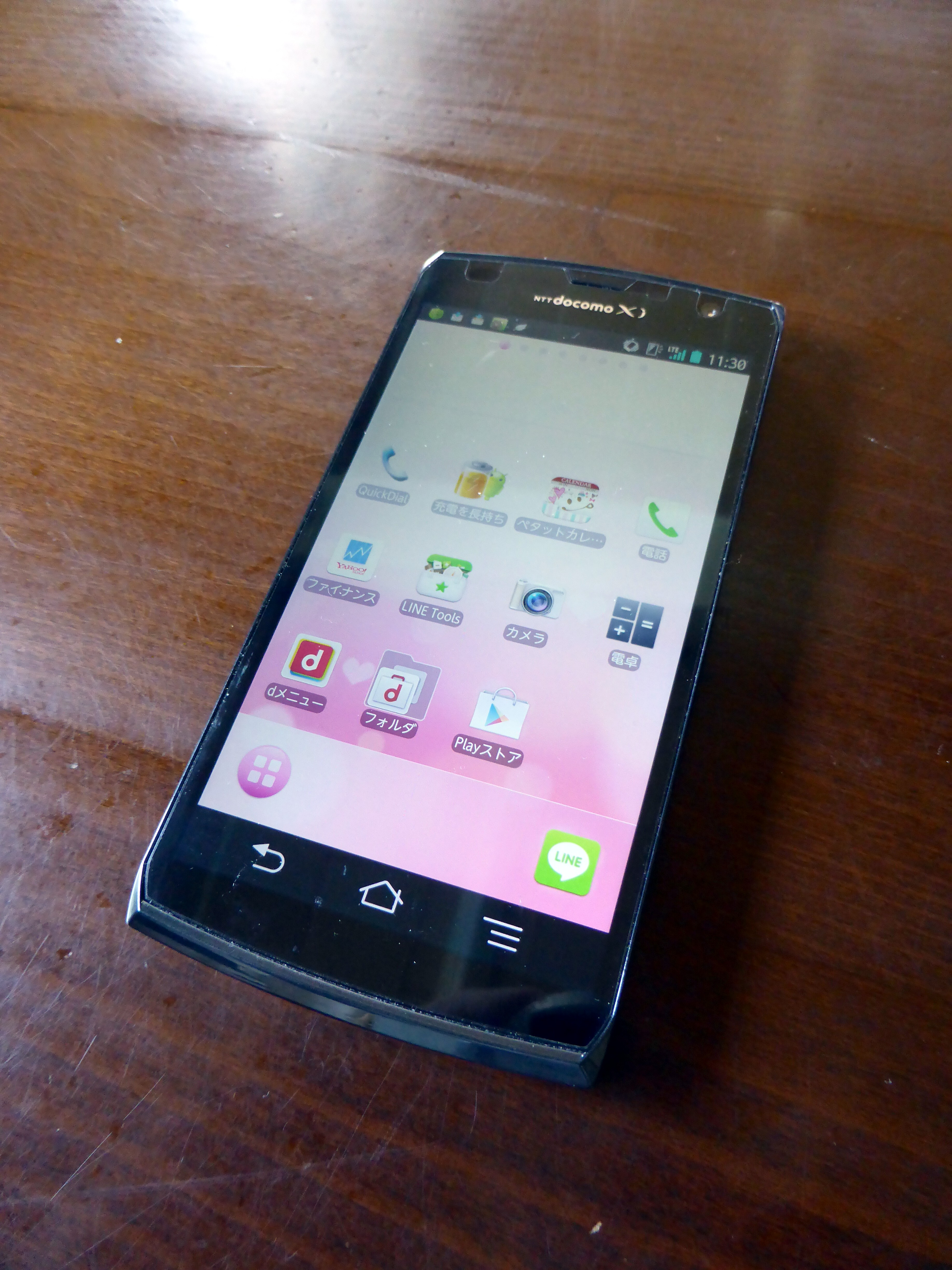
- ARROWS X F-02E (Black) front
- Brand: NTT Docomo
- Manufacturer: Fujitsu
- Series: docomo NEXT series
- Family: ARROWS
- First released: February 22, 2013
- Compatible networks: 3G: FOMA (W-CDMA); 2G: GSM
- Form factor: Slate
- Colors: White; Black
- Dimensions: 140 mm (5.5 in) H 69 mm (2.7 in) W 10.3 mm (0.41 in) D
- Weight: 157 g (5.5 oz)
- Operating system: Android 4.1.2
- System-on-chip: NVIDIA Tegra 3 AP37
- CPU: 1.7 GHz quad-core
- Memory: 2 GB RAM
- Storage: 32 GB
- Removable storage: microSD (up to 2 GB) microSDHC (up to 32 GB) microSDXC (up to 64 GB)
- Battery: 2420 mAh
- Rear camera: 16.3 MP back-illuminated CMOS (Exmor R for mobile), f/2.4
- Front camera: 1.3 MP CMOS, f/2.4
- Display: 5.0 in (130 mm) TFT LCD; 1920 × 1080 pixels (FHD), 16.77 million colors
- Connectivity: 3.9G: Xi; 3G: FOMA (HSDPA / HSUPA); 2G: GSM; Wi-Fi (IEEE 802.11a/b/g/n); Bluetooth 4.0; Infrared (IrSimple); FeliCa / NFC (Payment unsupported) microUSB (Host and MHL combined); 3.5 mm headset jack Desktop holder power terminal

The docomo NEXT series ARROWS X F-02E is a touchscreen Android mobile phone terminal supporting NTT Docomo's 3.9G LTE network (Xi) and 3G network (FOMA), manufactured and developed by Fujitsu. It belongs to the docomo NEXT series.

It was unveiled at the MWC 2013 at Barcelona.

== Specifications ==
=== Hardware ===
The ARROWS X F-02E serves as the third-generation high-end flagship "X" model in the ARROWS series for NTT Docomo. Like its predecessor, the F-10D, it utilizes the NVIDIA Tegra 3 quad-core system-on-chip, with its CPU clock speed upgraded from 1.5 GHz on the F-10D to 1.7 GHz. It features a 5.0-inch Full HD TFT LCD display with a resolution of 1920×1080 pixels displaying up to 16.77 million colors, supporting "Intelli-Color" which automatically adjusts screen color tones based on ambient light and active media content. Internal storage is set at 32 GB, which is half of the capacity offered by its sibling model, the ARROWS V F-04E. External storage expansion is provided via microSD cards up to 2 GB, microSDHC up to 32 GB, and microSDXC up to 64 GB, with user-accessible storage space totaling approximately 24.2 GB.

The main rear camera utilizes a 16.3-megapixel back-illuminated CMOS sensor (Exmor R for mobile) with an aperture of f/2.4, while the front-facing sub-camera features a 1.3-megapixel CMOS sensor with an aperture of f/2.4. Connectivity options include Xi, FOMA, GSM, Wi-Fi IEEE 802.11a/b/g/n, Bluetooth 4.0, infrared communications via IrSimple, and FeliCa/NFC (without payment compatibility). Unlike the F-10D, the device supports NOTTV broadcasts, but it lacks support for Qi wireless charging. External physical connections consist of a microUSB port supporting host and MHL functionalities, a 3.5 mm earphone microphone jack, and power contacts for a desktop cradle.

Power is provided by a 2,420 mAh battery. Continuous talk times are rated at approximately 520 minutes on 3G and 690 minutes on GSM. Continuous standby times are approximately 620 hours on 3G, 400 hours on LTE, and 420 hours on GSM. Recharging takes approximately 180 minutes using AC Adapter 04, 260 minutes when combining AC Adapter 04 with Desktop Holder F36, and 200 minutes using DC Adapter 03. The phone body measures 140 mm in height, 69 mm in width, and 10.3 mm in depth (with a maximum thickness of 10.7 mm), weighing approximately 157 grams.

=== Software ===
The ARROWS X F-02E is the first smartphone in the ARROWS series to ship with Android 4.1.2. The Japanese text input system incorporates ATOK with added handwriting recognition support. The software suite includes the home launcher NX!home, user assistant functions from the Human Centric Engine (HCE) such as "Clear Sight Display", "Shake Back", and "Touch Error Prevention".

== History ==
- January 22, 2013 – Officially announced by NTT Docomo.
- February 16, 2013 – Pre-orders opened.
- February 22, 2013 – Sales commenced.

== Known issues ==
- An issue where video playback in landscape orientation caused the screen brightness to become darker than the selected setting was fixed in an update released on April 30, 2013.
- An issue where prolonged continuous use of the device rarely caused it to reboot spontaneously was fixed in an update released on December 3, 2013.
- An issue where capturing still images using the camera application resulted in error messages and forced application closure was resolved in the December 3, 2013, update.
- An issue where geotagging location data was intermittently not attached to photos taken with the camera app was fixed in an update released on October 29, 2014.
