= SH-07A =

Sharp mobile phone released in 2009

- Brand: NTT Docomo
- Manufacturer: Sharp
- Type: Feature phone
- Series: docomo PRO series
- Family: AQUOS Phone
- First released: June 24, 2009
- Compatible networks: 3G: FOMA (W-CDMA) (800 MHz, 850 MHz, 2 GHz); 2G: GSM (850 MHz, 900 MHz, 1800 MHz, 1900 MHz)
- Form factor: Clamshell (Cycloid style)
- Colors: Red; Silver
- Dimensions: 112 mm (4.4 in) H 50 mm (2.0 in) W 15.8 mm (0.62 in) D (Thinnest section) / 23 mm (0.91 in) D (Thickest section)
- Weight: 143 g (5.0 oz)
- Operating system: Symbian OS + MOAP(S)
- CPU: SH-Mobile G3
- Storage: 2 GB
- Removable storage: microSD (up to 2 GB) microSDHC (up to 16 GB)
- Rear camera: 10.0 megapixel CCD, autofocus, image stabilization (still & video), face detection, LED flash
- Front camera: 0.43 megapixel CMOS
- Display: Main: 3.3 in (84 mm) New Mobile ASV, 480×854 Wide VGA+, 16,777,216 colors Sub: 1.0 in (25 mm) OLED, 39×96 pixels, 65,536 colors

The docomo PRO series SH-07A is a 3rd generation mobile phone (FOMA) terminal developed and announced on May 19, 2009 by Sharp for NTT Docomo. Released on June 24, 2009, It belongs to the docomo PRO series.

The SH-07A is a cycloid-style AQUOS Phone and the successor to the SH-01A. Positioned as an AV (audio-visual) specialized model, it was categorized under the PRO series, unlike the SH-01A which belonged to the docomo PRIME series. Consequently, despite being part of the PRO series, it became the first terminal in the lineup to adopt a standard flip-phone form factor. Due to its highly specialized positioning, color options were limited to two variants. In terms of design, it does not adopt the seamless new-style cycloid mechanism featured in SoftBank's Spring 2009 model (SoftBank 932SH); instead, it utilizes nearly the same chassis as the SH-01A. The interior key layout and shape remain almost unchanged.

== Specifications ==
The most significant external change is the sub-display on the rear: the 7-segment LED from the SH-01A was replaced with a 1.0-inch, approximately 65,536-color OLED panel, similar to the one used on the SH-02A. This drastically improved display capabilities over the SH-01A, which was highly limited in information output. The mail display has a 3.3-inch NEW Mobile ASV integrated with a dual "One-Seg" TV display functionality.

It also features a dedicated information LED. Alongside the SH-06A and SoftBank 933SH announced on the same day, the main camera features a 10-megapixel CCD sensor.

It includes a high-intensity LED flash, high-sensitivity shooting up to ISO 12800 equivalent, and "Chase Focus" continuous autofocus tracking.

Utitizing its 2-gigbyte internal memory (larger than other 10-megapixel models), users can store over 180 photos at full 10-megapixel resolution directly on the device. However, shooting at 10 megapixels is only available in standard portrait mode and cannot be used while in cycloid orientation. The sub-camera, consistent with other Sharp devices released concurrently, uses an approximately 0.43-megapixel CMOS sensor capable of capturing photos sized for standby wallpaper. Additional camera capabilities include image stabilization, a "Smile Focus Shutter" that automatically releases the shutter when detecting a smile, a "Turnaround Shutter", and six automated scene-recognition modes.

== Software upgrade ==
On October 29, 2009, NTT Docomo released a software update for Sharp FOMA mobile phone models SH-07A and SH-08A. The primary purpose of this update was to enable JavaScript support on the device's i-mode browser.

In NTT Docomo's Summer 2009 device lineup, a bug in the updated i-mode browser specification had forced the company to ship phones with JavaScript disabled by default for approximately five months. Alongside re-enabling JavaScript, the update fixed system bugs that prevented access to sub-menus on the SH-07A and caused the i-mode menu to fail to launch on both models.
