= Sharp Aquos Phone SH-12C =

2011 smartphone model

AQUOS PHONE SH-12C
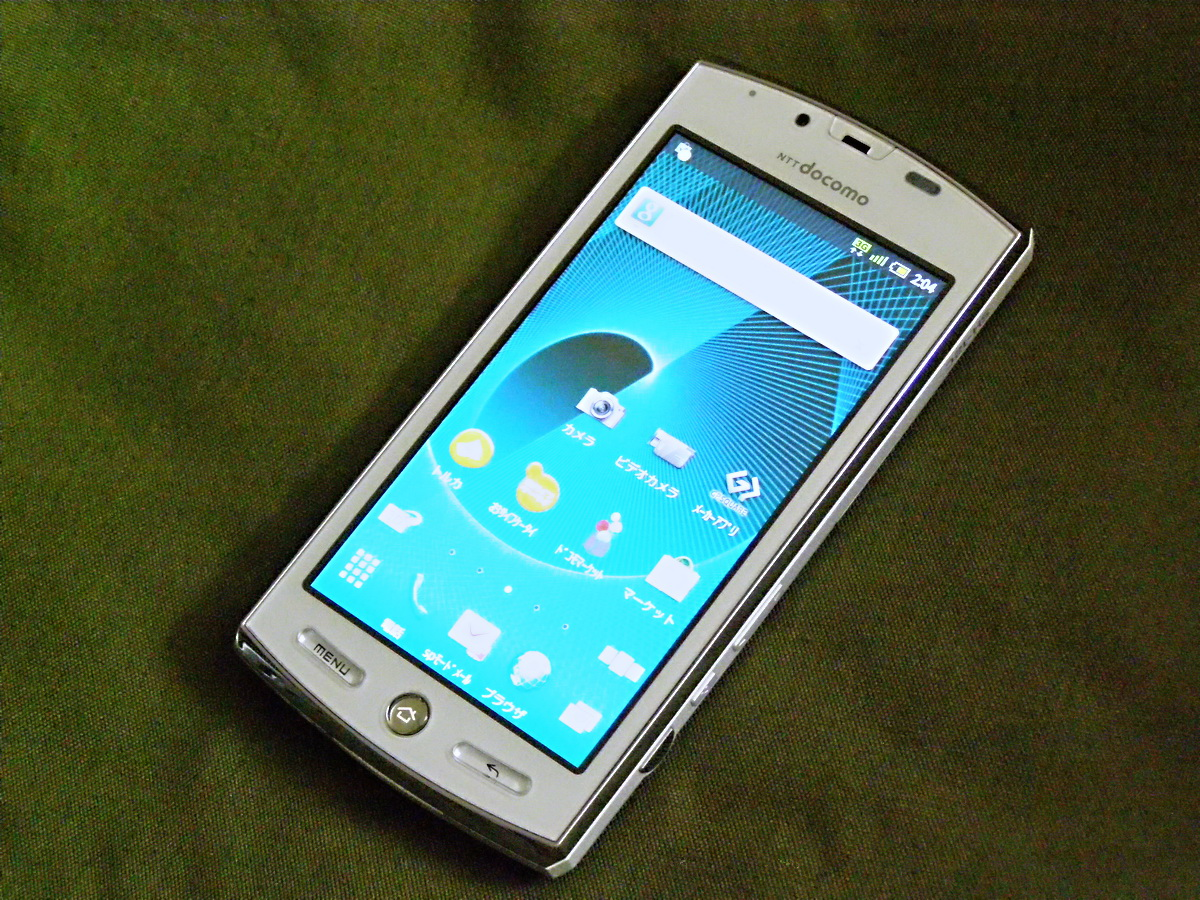
- SH-12C in White
- Brand: NTT Docomo
- Manufacturer: Sharp
- Type: Smartphone
- Series: Docomo NEXT series
- First released: May 20, 2011; 15 years ago
- Predecessor: LYNX 3D SH-03C
- Compatible networks: 3G: FOMA (W-CDMA) (800 MHz, 850 MHz, 2.1 GHz); 3.5G: FOMA (HSDPA/HSUPA); 2G: GSM/EDGE (850 MHz, 900 MHz, 1800 MHz, 1900 MHz); Wi-Fi: IEEE 802.11b/g/n
- Form factor: Slate
- Colors: White; Black
- Dimensions: 127 mm (5.0 in) H 64 mm (2.5 in) W 11.9 mm (0.47 in) D
- Weight: 138 g (4.9 oz)
- Operating system: Android 2.3.3
- System-on-chip: Qualcomm Snapdragon MSM8255T
- CPU: 1.4 GHz
- Memory: 512 MB RAM
- Storage: 2 GB ROM
- Removable storage: microSD (up to 2 GB), microSDHC (up to 32 GB)
- Battery: 3.7 V 1240 mAh (4.6 Wh)
- Rear camera: 8.0 MP CMOS (Twin-lens 3D camera)
- Front camera: 0.3 MP CMOS
- Display: 4.2 in (110 mm) qHD (540×960 pixels), 262,144 colors, New Mobile ASV LCD (3D parallax barrier)
- Model: SH-12C

The Docomo Smartphone AQUOS PHONE SH-12C, later categorized under the docomo NEXT series AQUOS PHONE SH-12C, is a 3G FOMA mobile device developed by Sharp for NTT Docomo. It operates on the Android 2.3 operating system. Originally announced on 11 May as part of the Docomo Smartphone line featuring dual 8-megapixel rear cameras capable of true 3D photo and video recording as part of NTT Docomo's summer lineup, it was showcased to the media at an official event., it was reclassified under the docomo NEXT series starting with the Summer 2011 model lineup.

== Specifications ==
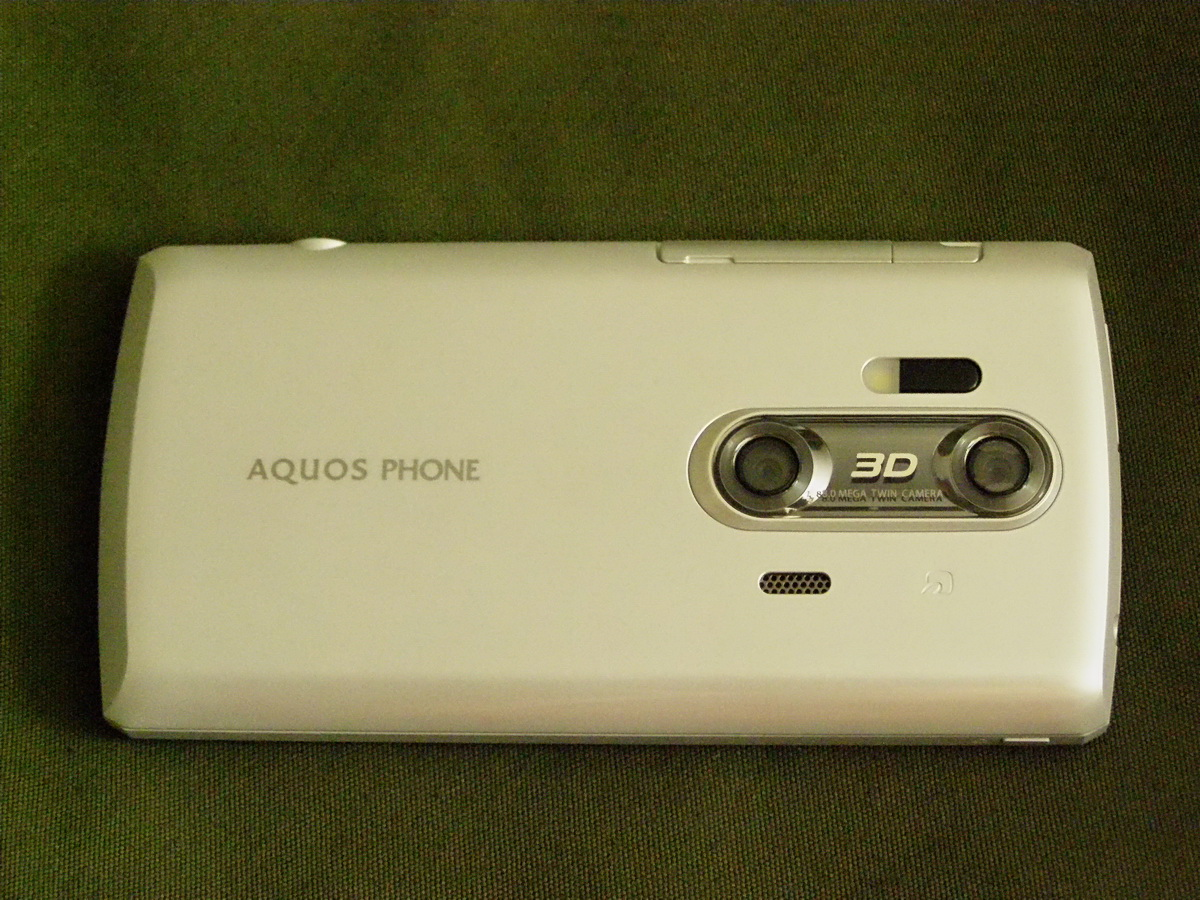
Rear panel

The SH-12C is an Android 2.3 smartphone designed as the successor to the LYNX 3D SH-03C. Inheriting features from its predecessor, it supports standard Japanese feature phone functionality including 1Seg TV playback, infrared communication, barcode reading, business card scanning, and a color "Veil View" privacy screen mode. Additionally, it features Osaifu-Keitai (FeliCa mobile payment support) and a mobile 3D LCD screen.

While the SH-03C required users to manually shift the device to capture 3D still photos, the SH-12C incorporates a twin-lens setup capable of recording native 3D video and capturing 3D still photos without moving the camera. It also supports 3D-compatible auto-focus modes such as "Smile Focus Shutter" and "Turn-around Shutter", along with a face detection system capable of tracking up to five faces simultaneously.

The camera user interface includes proprietary Sharp functions, such as automatically classifying photos and videos by time, location, and subject to display them on a map interface or sync them with calendar events. The rear camera is also capable of capturing Full HD video.

The 4.2-inch qHD (540×960 pixels) display is powered by Sharp's high-definition image processing engine under the AQUOS brand line. Utilizing the parallax barrier 3D LCD technology seen in the SH-03C, it allows users to view 3D games, pre-installed media, stereoscopic videos on platforms such as YouTube and BeeTV, and converted 2D-to-pseudo-3D 1Seg broadcasts without requiring special glasses.

The touchscreen utilizes capacitive full-touch technology and includes an orientation sensor (geomagnetic sensor) and an accelerometer. Text input is handled via software keyboards, supporting 10-key flick input, QWERTY layouts, and handwriting recognition.

For connectivity, the device supports FOMA High Speed (HSDPA Category 10) with maximum download speeds of up to 14 Mbps and upload speeds up to 5.7 Mbps. It also features Wi-Fi (IEEE 802.11b/g/n) supporting speeds up to 150 Mbps and Wi-Fi hotspot functionality (tethering).

A Type-D micro-HDMI port allows users to output photos and videos to external displays, including 3D output to compatible AQUOS TVs. Through Wi-Fi, the device can also interface wirelessly with DLNA-compatible home network devices to stream media, serving as an early integration effort toward Sharp's "Smart TV" platform. Pre-installed applications include Home Network (Transmit) and Home Network (Receive).

The contacts directory integrates with social media networks such as Twitter and mixi, allowing users to view social timelines directly within contact entries. It also features "TapFlow UI", an adaptive interface that customizes quick actions based on communication history and frequent user interactions.

Additionally, applications for major Japanese music streaming platforms, such as mora touch and music.jp for SH, are pre-installed.

The SH-12C was also the first smartphone sold by NTT Docomo to support official SIM lock unlocking through Docomo Shops for a handling fee of 3,150 yen.
