= Sharp Aquos Phone Zeta SH-06E =

Android mobile phone manufactured by Sharp

AQUOS PHONE ZETA SH-06E
- Brand: NTT Docomo
- Manufacturer: Sharp
- Type: Smartphone
- Series: Docomo Smartphone
- First released: May 24, 2013; 13 years ago
- Predecessor: AQUOS PHONE ZETA SH-02E
- Compatible networks: 3G: FOMA (W-CDMA); 2G: GSM; 3.9G: Xi
- Form factor: Slate
- Colors: White; Red; Blue
- Dimensions: 138 mm (5.4 in) H 70 mm (2.8 in) W 9.9 mm (0.39 in) D (10.4 mm max)
- Weight: 157 g (5.5 oz)
- Operating system: Android 4.2.2
- System-on-chip: Qualcomm Snapdragon 600 APQ8064T
- CPU: 1.7 GHz Quad-core
- Memory: 2 GB RAM
- Storage: 32 GB ROM (approx. 25.6 GB user accessible)
- Removable storage: microSD (up to 2 GB), microSDHC (up to 32 GB), microSDXC (up to 64 GB)
- Battery: 2600 mAh (non-user removable)
- Charging: Qi wireless charging
- Rear camera: 13.1 MP back-illuminated CMOS, f/1.9 "Bright Eye" lens, OIS, 1080p video recording, HDR
- Front camera: 2.1 MP back-illuminated CMOS
- Display: 4.8 in (120 mm) IGZO LCD, 1080p FHD (1920×1080 pixels), 460 ppi, ~16.77 million colors
- Water resistance: Waterproof
- Model: SH-06E

The Docomo Smartphone AQUOS PHONE ZETA SH-06E is a touchscreen Android smartphone manufactured and developed by Sharp Corporation for NTT Docomo, operating on their Xi 3.9G and FOMA 3G networks. It was released as part of Docomo's second-generation smartphone lineup.

== History ==
- On May 15, 2013, NTT Docomo officially announced the AQUOS PHONE ZETA SH-06E.
- On May 24, 2013, the device was released for commercial sale in Japan.
- On June 26, 2014, NTT Docomo announced that the device would not receive an upgrade to Android 4.4.
- Application support for devices running Android 4.4 and lower was eventually phased out by major application providers.

== Specifications ==
=== Hardware ===
The SH-06E succeeds the SH-02E and features an upgraded 4.8-inch IGZO LCD display with Full HD resolution (1920×1080). Unlike its predecessor which used onscreen navigation buttons, the SH-06E utilizes capacitive touch buttons below the display screen.

It is powered by a Qualcomm Snapdragon 600 APQ8064T quad-core processor clocked at 1.7 GHz, paired with 2 GB of RAM and 32 GB of internal storage. The storage can be expanded via microSD cards up to 2 GB, microSDHC up to 32 GB, and microSDXC up to 64 GB.

The rear camera features a 13.1-megapixel back-illuminated CMOS sensor equipped with a wide f/1.9 "Bright Eye" lens, optical image stabilization, and Full HD video recording. The front camera consists of a 2.1-megapixel back-illuminated CMOS sensor.

The device includes a 2600 mAh internal battery that uses a slot-in locking mechanism, allowing battery replacements to be handled in-store at Docomo service counters rather than requiring off-site repair shipments.

Connectivity options include IEEE 802.11a/b/g/n/ac Wi-Fi, Bluetooth 4.0, NFC, FeliCa, infrared port, MicroUSB with MHL host capability, and Qi wireless charging. The device casing features waterproof construction with a capless waterproof microUSB port.

=== Software ===
The AQUOS PHONE ZETA SH-06E launched running the Android 4.2.2 Jelly Bean operating system using the iWnn Japanese input method.

The preinstalled standard Google application suite includes Chrome, Gmail, Google+, Google Search, Google Settings, Play Store, Play Books, Play Music, Play Movies, YouTube, Talk (later Hangouts), Navigation, Maps, Messenger, Local, and Voice Search.

The device includes manufacturer software such as OfficeSuite, SH Tools, Album, Osaifu-Keitai, Camera, Calendar, Downloads, Browser, Mail, Messaging, Music, One Seg TV viewer, Calculator, Clock, and User Manual.

Network services support includes Docomo Mail, Phonebook Backup, Deco-mail, i-channel, i-concier, Shabette-Concier, Area Mail emergency alerts, and tethering.

== Known issues ==
- On June 5, 2013, a software update was issued to resolve an issue where the screen failed to turn on when pressing the power key in sleep mode, and an issue where rapid taps on the back key were not recognized.
- On June 24, 2013, an update addressed intermittent audio cutouts during voice calls and weak vibrator motor intensity.
- On July 31, 2013, an update fixed an issue where touching the screen while pressing the power button caused the touchscreen to stop responding, as well as an issue causing prolonged vibration upon receiving sp-mode emails.
- On October 7, 2013, an update fixed an issue where using the Sweep ON feature during calls caused unexpected vibration and call disconnection.
- On March 31, 2014, an update resolved a bug where valid microSD cards caused continuous notifications stating the card was unexpectedly removed.
- On July 14, 2014, an update resolved an issue in the Music app where scrolling displayed a false "Reading microSD card" prompt.
- On December 18, 2014, an update was released to fix intermittent system freezes while the device was in sleep mode.
