= Fujitsu ARROWS NX F-01F =

Android smartphone

ARROWS NX F-01F
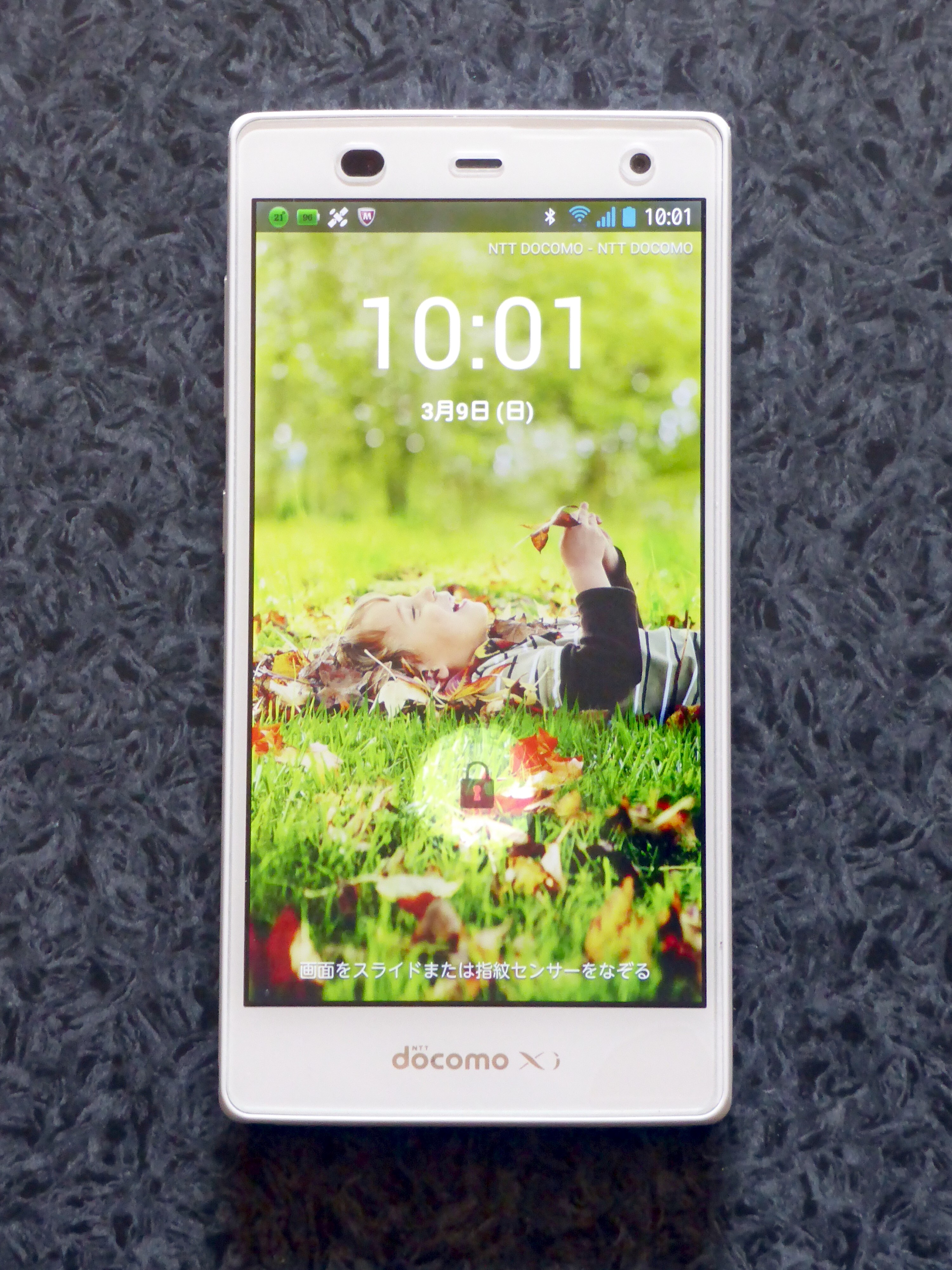
- ARROWS NX F-01F (White)
- Brand: NTT Docomo
- Manufacturer: Fujitsu
- Type: Smartphone
- Series: ARROWS
- Family: Docomo Smartphone
- First released: October 24, 2013; 12 years ago
- Predecessor: ARROWS NX F-06E
- Successor: ARROWS NX F-05F
- Compatible networks: 3G: FOMA (W-CDMA); 2G: GSM; 3.9G: Xi
- Form factor: Slate
- Colors: White; Blue Black; Magenta
- Dimensions: 140 mm (5.5 in) H 70 mm (2.8 in) W 10 mm (0.39 in) D
- Weight: 150 g (5.3 oz)
- Operating system: Android 4.2.2 (Jelly Bean), upgradable to Android 4.4.2 (KitKat)
- System-on-chip: Qualcomm Snapdragon 800 MSM8974
- CPU: 2.2 GHz quad-core
- Memory: 2 GB RAM
- Storage: 32 GB ROM
- Removable storage: microSD (up to 2 GB), microSDHC (up to 32 GB), microSDXC (up to 64 GB)
- Battery: 3,200 mAh (non-removable)
- Rear camera: 13.1 MP back-illuminated stacked CMOS (Exmor RS for mobile)
- Front camera: 1.3 MP CMOS
- Display: 4.97-inch FHD (1920×1080 pixels) TFT WhiteMagic Display, ~16.77 million colors
- Water resistance: Waterproof
- Model: F-01F

The Docomo Smartphone ARROWS NX F-01F is a dual-mode smartphone developed by Fujitsu for NTT Docomo, supporting 3.9G (Xi) and 3G (FOMA) mobile communications. It is part of the second-generation Docomo Smartphone series.

== History ==
On October 10, 2013, NTT Docomo announced the device and opened pre-orders. Sales officially began on October 24, 2013. On June 26, 2014, the smartphone was selected as a target model for the Android 4.4 upgrade. On September 29, 2014, Fujitsu was ranked overall first place in the Oricon Customer Satisfaction Ranking for Mobile Phone Manufacturers.

== Specifications ==
=== Hardware ===
The ARROWS NX F-01F features a 4.97-inch Full HD TFT display utilizing WhiteMagic technology developed by Sony, achieving a maximum brightness of 800 cd/m² while reducing power consumption by approximately 45% compared to conventional TFT displays. It is powered by a Qualcomm Snapdragon 800 MSM8974 quad-core processor running at 2.2 GHz, paired with 2 GB of RAM and 32 GB of internal storage, expandability via microSD cards up to 64 GB.

The rear camera uses a 13.1-megapixel back-illuminated stacked CMOS sensor (Exmor RS for mobile) combined with the "GRANVU" image processing engine developed by Fujitsu Semiconductor, while the front camera features a 1.3-megapixel CMOS sensor. The device is equipped with a round fingerprint sensor, a non-removable 3,200 mAh battery, and capless waterproof protection for the USB port. Connectivity options include 3.9G Xi LTE, 3G FOMA, Wi-Fi IEEE 802.11a/b/g/n/ac, Bluetooth 4.0, FeliCa/NFC, infrared communication, One-Seg, Full-Seg, and Mobacas TV tuner capabilities.

=== Software ===
The smartphone launched with Android 4.2.2 (Jelly Bean) and was later updated to Android 4.4.2 (KitKat). The user interface incorporates Fujitsu's Human Centric Engine and "NX! Eco" power-saving software, which offers multiple battery management modes ("Strict", "Gentle", and "Original") alongside automatic CPU core and clock optimization based on performance demand. Japanese text entry is powered by ATOK with handwriting recognition support. Pre-installed applications include standard Google services (Play Store, YouTube, Gmail, Maps, Google+), NTT Docomo carrier services, and utility apps such as a TV viewer, camera, and Twitter client.

== Known issues ==
- In some cases, Osaifu-Keitai and related applications such as the iD app failed to start properly; this was resolved in the November 26, 2013 software update.
- A bug occurred where pressing the power key would fail to wake the device from sleep mode, leaving the display blank; this issue was addressed in the March 27, 2014 update.
- An issue where the battery level display on the dashboard widget failed to update was resolved in the September 10, 2014 update.
- A bug causing sudden and rapid fluctuations in the reported battery level indicator was fixed in the December 1, 2014 update.
