= Panasonic Eluga X =

Android smartphone

ELUGA X P-02E
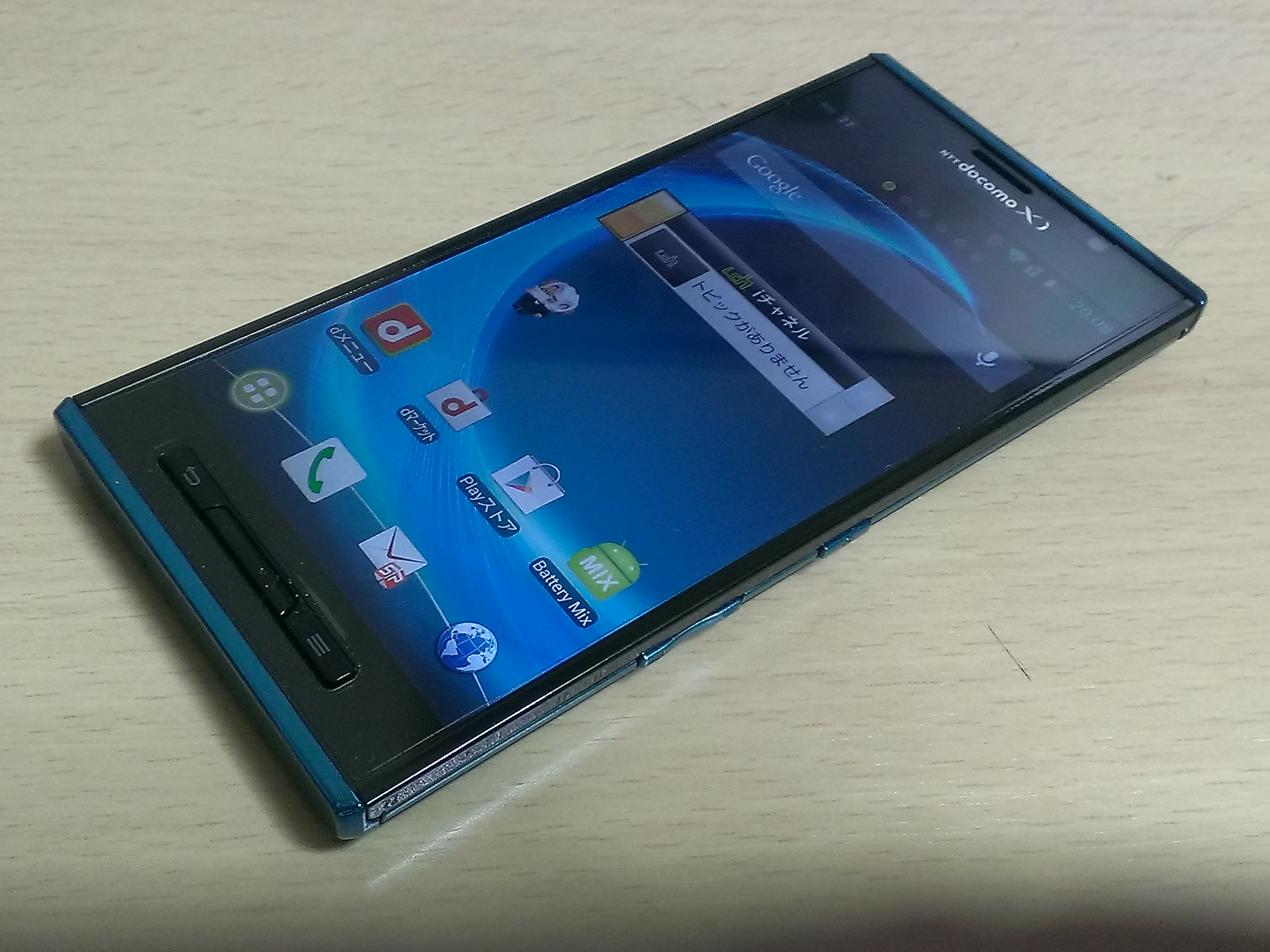
- Front panel view of P-02E
- Brand: NTT Docomo
- Manufacturer: Panasonic Mobile Communications
- Series: docomo NEXT series
- Family: ELUGA
- First released: January 30, 2013
- Predecessor: ELUGA V P-06D, ELUGA power P-07D
- Successor: ELUGA P P-03E
- Compatible networks: 3G: FOMA (W-CDMA); 2G: GSM
- Form factor: Slate
- Colors: Blue Green; Black
- Dimensions: 139 mm (5.5 in) H 68 mm (2.7 in) W 9.9 mm (0.39 in) D
- Weight: 152 g (5.4 oz)
- Operating system: Android 4.1.2
- CPU: 1.5 GHz quad-core Qualcomm Snapdragon S4 Pro APQ8064
- Memory: 2 GB RAM
- Storage: 32 GB
- Removable storage: microSD (up to 2 GB), microSDHC (up to 32 GB), microSDXC (up to 64 GB)
- Battery: 2320 mAh
- Charging: Qi wireless charging
- Rear camera: 13.2 MP CMOS
- Front camera: 1.3 MP CMOS
- Display: 5.0 in (127 mm) TFT LCD, 1920×1080 px (Full HD)

The docomo NEXT series ELUGA X P-02E is a dual-mode mobile terminal supporting 3.9G LTE (Xi) and 3G (FOMA) networks developed by Panasonic Mobile Communications for NTT Docomo. It is part of the docomo NEXT series.

== History ==
- December 26, 2012 – Appeared in the FCC listing.
- January 22, 2013 – Announced by NTT Docomo.
- January 23, 2013 – Pre-orders began.
- January 30, 2013 – Officially released.

== Specifications ==
=== Hardware ===
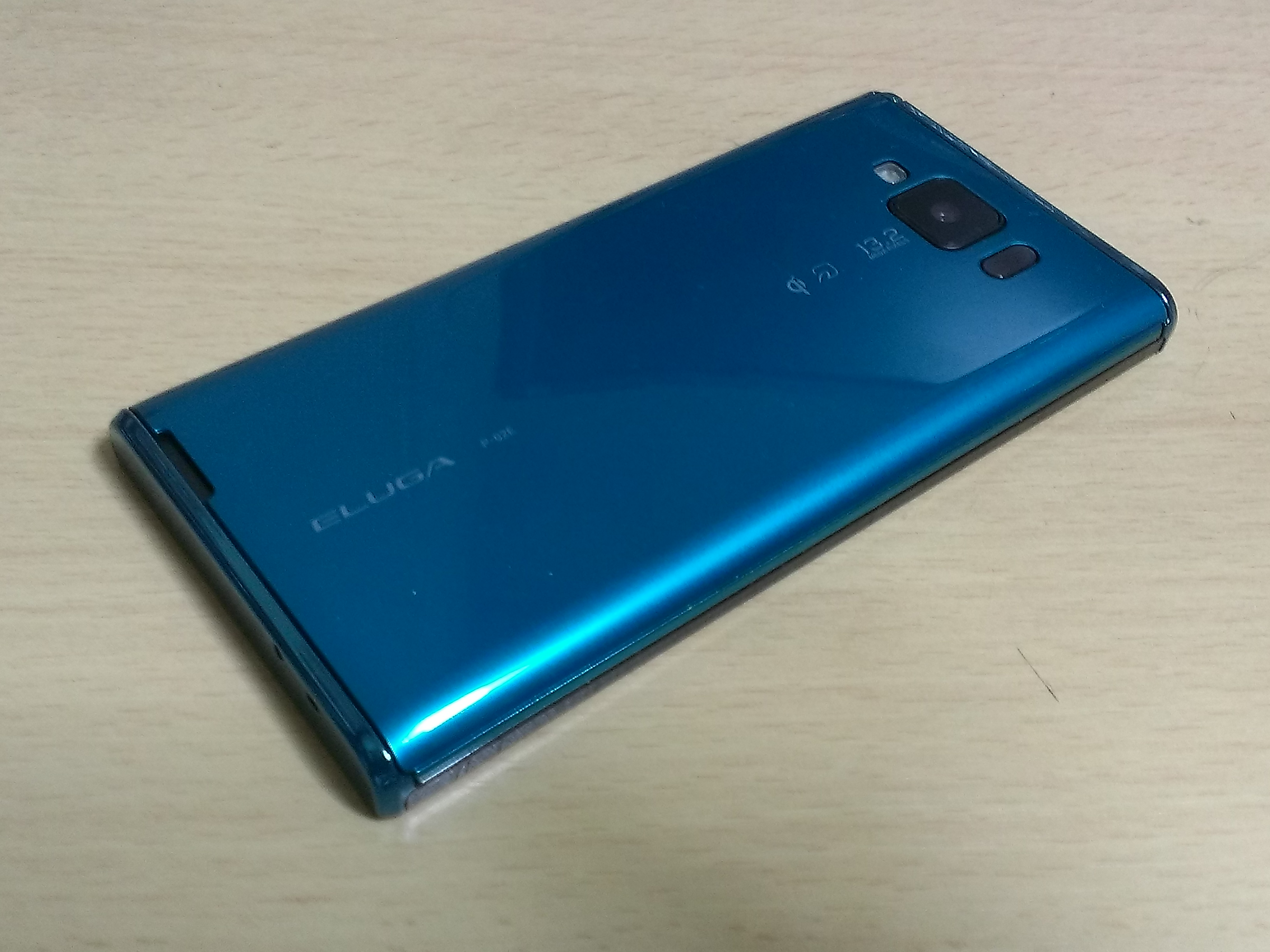
Back panel view

The ELUGA X P-02E features a 5.0-inch Full HD TFT display with narrow 3 mm side bezels, keeping the overall width to 68 mm. It is powered by a 1.5 GHz quad-core Qualcomm Snapdragon S4 Pro (APQ8064) processor paired with 2 GB of RAM and 32 GB of internal storage, expandable up to 64 GB via microSDXC. The device includes a 13.2-megapixel rear camera and a 1.3-megapixel front-facing camera. Power is supplied by a 2,320 mAh battery supporting Qi wireless charging. Connectivity options include Wi-Fi (IEEE 802.11a/b/g/n), Bluetooth 4.0, NFC/FeliCa, IrDA (IrSimple), Miracast display sharing, and 1seg / Mobile Cast TV tuners, though it lacks MHL or HDMI output ports.

=== Software ===
The smartphone runs on Android 4.1.2 Jelly Bean. The user interface options include docomo Palette UI, Fit Home, and a simplified "Feature Phone Mode" that provides a traditional 4×3 icon grid along with swipeable call logs on the home screen. Pre-installed applications include standard Google mobile services along with vendor-provided tools such as Polaris Office 4.0, Panasonic Smart, and ELUGA Link.
