= Tales of the World: Dice Adventure =

2012 video game

- Developer: Namco Bandai Games
- Publisher: Namco Bandai Games
- Series: Tales
- Platform: Web browser
- Release: JP: April 26, 2012
- Genres: Board game, roleplaying game
- Modes: Single-player, Multiplayer

Tales of the World: Dice Adventure (テイルズ オブ ザ ワールド ダイスアドベンチャー, Teiruzu obu za Wārudo Daisu Adobenchā) was a web browser-based board game in the Tales series of video games. It was released on April 26, 2012 in Japanese language only, though it was playable in any region with a Namco Bandai ID. Service for the title official ended on June 28, 2013.

== Gameplay ==
The game played as a roleplaying game and board game hybrid. The player rolled virtual dice to determine how much a character moves across the board. Through the course of traversing the board, the player could form parties with other characters, experience story events, and even participate in battles. As with all of the games in the Tales of the World subseries, the game was a crossover video game containing many characters from the main series of Tales video games. The characters were presented in a cutesy, "chibi" style, reminiscent of how Final Fantasy characters were recreated for the Nintendo 3DS video game Theatrhythm Final Fantasy.

The game followed the free-to-play business model, where it allowed a player to play entirely for free, but with the option of buying in-game items with real-life money. The only requirement was to have, or sign up for, a Bandai Namco ID, to sign into the game. Additionally, Namco Bandai separately released snack food for purchase that contained serial codes for downloading additional content to the game.

The game received special animation created by production studio A-1 Pictures, the same studio has made videos for the Shin Megami Tensei: Persona, Valkyria Chronicles, and The Idolmaster series of video games and anime.

== Development ==
The game was first revealed in December 2011, both at the Jump Festa event, and in the respective issue of Weekly Shōnen Jump. The game initially set towards a "Spring 2012" release window before ultimately being released on April 26, 2012. The game also offers Smartphone support.
