= Tales of Phantasia: Narikiri Dungeon X =

2010 video game

- Official cover art
- Developer: Namco Tales Studio
- Publisher: Namco Bandai Games
- Director: Tomomi Masubuchi
- Producers: Shinichiro Okamoto; Ryuuji Oodate
- Artists: Kōsuke Fujishima; Yuuta Saitoh
- Composers: Motoi Sakuraba; Shinji Tamura
- Series: Tales
- Platform: PlayStation Portable
- Release: JP: August 5, 2010
- Genre: Action role-playing game
- Mode: Single-player

Tales of Phantasia: Narikiri Dungeon X is 2010 role-playing video game for the PlayStation Portable developed by Namco Tales Studio and published by Namco Bandai Games. It is a remake of the Game Boy Color game Tales of Phantasia: Narikiri Dungeon. Like the original, the story begins 205 years after the beginning of the first game in the series Tales of Phantasia. The game's theme song is "Glass Flower" (ガラスの花, Garasu No Hana) and was sung by Hanako Oku.

In addition, the game also includes a separate game, Tales of Phantasia X, which is the first remake of Tales of Phantasia. It was released in Japan on August 5, 2010.

== Gameplay ==
Gameplay screenshot showing the game's XAR-LMBS

Both games utilize the Cross Arts Aerial Linear Motion Battle System (XAR-LMBS) which is a tweaked version of the series' Linear Motion Battle System which is used in almost every game in the series though each game features its own unique version of the LMBS. Battles take place in a 3D environment with 2D character sprites. The two main characters of the game Dio and Mel can change into any of the clothes they are given, depending on the clothes the characters can change skills and obtain certain equipment. For example, Dio can change into Samurai and Shinobi clothes while Mel can change into Nurse and Witch clothes. The game features a total of about 80 costumes.

== Characters ==
=== Narikiri Dungeon X ===
Dio
One of the Narikiri twins, he is carefree and optimistic.
Mel
One of the Narikiri twins, she is more level-headed and mature.
Etos
A fairy from another world, she is the adoptive mother of Dio and Mel.
Norn
A spirit who entrusted the twins to Etos.
Albert
A talking wardrobe sent by Norn to keep outfits for the twins. He adores Mel but argues with Dio.
Kruelle
A weird creature that Dio and Mel saved from a monster. It is able to change its form and has high fighting power.
Rondoline E. Effenberg
A free-spirited time-traveler who wants to alter history. Her sporadic travels through time intersect with events in Tales of Phantasia: Cross Edition, where she appears as a guest party member.

=== Phantasia X ===
Cress Albane
A swordsman who seeks the answer as to what "true justice" really is, and uses his family's Albane Style swordsmanship.
Mint Adenade
A healer whose weakness is not being able to heal the hearts of others; this often bothers her.
Arche Klein
A half-elf who is extremely playful and likes to tease others. Due to her being a half-elf she has a long life which leads to her being left behind by others making her feel lonely.
Claus F. Lester
A summoner from ancient Euclid.
Chester Burklight
Childhood friend of Cress who was thought to be killed early in the story. The party recruits him later on at a low level.
Suzu Fujibayashi
A ninja and current chief of Ninja Village.

== Development ==
The game was officially unveiled in the issue of Jump magazine in March 2010. Prior to that Japanese illustrator, Kazuyoshi Nagiyuma, who previously worked on Tales of Vesperia, said that he had just finished doing illustrations for Tales of Phantasia: Narikiri Dungeon R, which has been presumably renamed to Tales of Phantasia: Narikiri Dungeon X.
