= Tales of Phantasia =

1995 video game

- Packaging for the Super Famicom version
- Developer: Wolf Team
- Publishers: JP: Namco (SFC, PS, GBA); NA/EU: Nintendo (GBA); JP: Namco Bandai Games (PSP)
- Director: Eiji Kikuchi
- Producers: Shigeru Yokoyama; Yoichi Haraguchi
- Artist: Kōsuke Fujishima
- Writer: Yoshiharu Gotanda
- Composers: Motoi Sakuraba; Shinji Tamura; Ryota Furuya
- Series: Tales
- Platforms: Super Famicom, PlayStation, Game Boy Advance, PlayStation Portable, mobile phone, iOS
- Release: December 15, 1995: Super Famicom; JP: December 15, 1995 PlayStation; JP: December 23, 1998; JP: September 28, 2000 (re-release) Game Boy Advance; JP: August 1, 2003; NA: March 6, 2006; EU: March 31, 2006; AU: April 13, 2006 PlayStation Portable; JP: September 6, 2006; JP: August 9, 2007 (re-release) Mobile; JP: March 17, 2010 iOS; JP: September 24, 2013; NA: January 23, 2014
- Genre: Action role-playing
- Mode: Single-player

Tales of Phantasia (Note: Japanese: テイルズ オブ ファンタジア, Hepburn: Teiruzu Obu Fantajia) is an action role-playing video game developed by Wolf Team and published by Namco for the Super Famicom. Originally released only in Japan in December 1995, it is the first title in the Tales series. It was later ported to a number of other platforms, including a Japan-exclusive version for the PlayStation in December 1998 and a Game Boy Advance version published by Namco in Japan in August 2003 and later published by Nintendo in North America and Europe in March 2006, which marked the first time the game was officially available in English. A PlayStation Portable remaster known as Tales of Phantasia Full Voice Edition (Note: Tales of Phantasia Full Voice Edition (テイルズ オブ ファンタジア-フルボイスエディション-, Teiruzu Obu Fantajia -Furu Boisu Edishon-)) followed in September 2006, featuring full voice acting during story scenes, which was later included with further enhancements as part of Tales of Phantasia: Narikiri Dungeon X in June 2010. The game's producers have given it the characteristic genre name Legendary RPG (Note: Legendary RPG (伝説のRPG, Densetsu no RPG)) beginning with the PlayStation version, with the Full Voice Edition given the moniker Legendary RPG Embellished with Voices. (Note: Legendary RPG Embellished with Voices (声が彩る、伝説のRPG, Koe ga irodoru, densetsu no RPG)) An unofficial fan translation of the original Super Famicom version was released on February 12, 2001, by Dejap.

The game takes place in a fantasy world of Aselia and follows Cress Albane, a highly-trained swordsman who is driven by vengeance after his hometown is destroyed. Seeking further answers, he finds out that this is none other than a scheme to free the war-mongering Dhaos, the game's main antagonist. To prevent further catastrophes, Cress is aided by the use of time travel to gather allies from the past who can help him put an end to Dhaos's rampage in his own time.

The game was written and programmed by Yoshiharu Gotanda, designed by Masaki Norimoto, and scored by Motoi Sakuraba, Shinji Tamura and Ryota Furuya. The character designs were created by manga artist Kōsuke Fujishima. A short anime series based on the game, called Tales of Phantasia: The Animation, was released in 2004.

Tales of Phantasia experienced several delays and development challenges prior to its release in 1995, near the end of the Super Famicom's lifespan. It attracted attention due to its graphics, its original battle system, and its use of voice acting. It is also the first and only Super Famicom game to include an original, vocalized theme song. It sold over 1.3 million units in Japan alone, making it the second bestselling game in the franchise in that region, and one of the bestselling games in the franchise as a whole.

== Gameplay ==
=== Battle system ===
Screenshot from the original Super Famicom version

In the Linear Motion Battle System (LMBS), the fight is played out on a two-dimensional terrain that usually stretches wider than a single screen width, so the screen can scroll to the left and to the right, depending on where the characters and opponents are relatively located. LMBS contains a pause menu during battle that lets the player select a spell or item. As in some fighting games, it is possible to assign items or combination moves to specific buttons as shortcuts for quick actions.

As opposed to most other turn-based systems where the player controls the individual actions of every party member, in LMBS, the player only directly controls the main character in real-time. The other characters in the party can be set to passive mode (defend only), active mode and attack (computer-controlled), or the player can often force the characters to move or use a spell from the pause menu. For the titles that allow multiplayer, the other party characters can be controlled by other human players.

== Plot ==
=== Characters ===
- Cress Albane (クレス・アルベイン, Kuresu Arubein; "Cless Alvein"), the main character of Tales of Phantasia, is a 17-year-old swordsman from a small village who grew up with his best friend Chester. A natural warrior who learned the way of fighting from his father, he is otherwise an earnest and caring individual who develops romantic feelings for Mint.
- Chester Burklight (チェスター・バークライト, Chesutā Bākuraito"; Chester Barklight) is a 17-year-old archer and Cress's hometown friend. Highly devoted to his friends and family, he has a one-track mind and a tendency to rush into situations without thinking of the consequences.
- Mint Adenade (ミント・アドネード, Minto Adonēdo) is an 18-year-old priestess and daughter of a famous cleric. She commands powerful healing magic and possesses a strong sense of duty and courage that override her otherwise quiet and modest personality.
- Claus F. Lester (クラース・F・レスター, Kurāsu F. Resutā; "Klarth F. Lester") is a 29-year-old man with a deep knowledge of spirits. With the aid of magical rings, he is able to summon spirits after defeating them. He lives with a woman named Mirald Rune, who helps him with research into magic and summoning.
- Arche Klein (アーチェ・クライン, Āche Kurain; "Arche Klaine") is a 17-year-old half-elf magician. She uses a broomstick both to fly and to wield as a weapon, and is characterized by a bright, airy personality that masks her years of discrimination due to her mixed heritage.
- Suzu Fujibayashi (藤林 すず, Fujibayashi Suzu) is an 11-year-old ninja and the granddaughter of her village's chief. Originally a non-playable character in the Super Famicom version, Suzu became an optional playable character in the PlayStation version and onwards.

=== Story ===
The game begins as four heroes are locked in battle with a powerful sorcerer king named Dhaos. Before he can be defeated, Dhaos uses his magic to travel several years into the future, where he is immediately met by one of the four warriors' descendants and three companions, who seal him away with two magic pendants. Twelve years later, two young men named Cress and Chester return to their village to find it razed to the ground by a dark knight named Mars, whose army kills many of its inhabitants including Cress's parents and Chester's sister. While Chester stays behind to bury them, Cress leaves to meet his uncle Olson for help, who reveals that he is being forced to work for Mars before stealing his father's pendant and locking him in jail. Quickly escaping with the help of a dying woman in a nearby cell, he meets another prisoner, a young priestess named Mint, who reveals that the woman was her mother before the two leave through the dungeon's aqueducts.

After rendezvousing with Chester, the party meets Trinicus D. Morrison, one of the four heroes who sealed Dhaos away years ago, who reveals that their parents were once his comrades and is shocked to discover that Cress and Mint's pendants were stolen. Following him to a nearby mausoleum, the group encounters Mars just as he uses the pendants to break the seal on Dhaos's tomb, setting him free. As Mars is killed by the dark sorcerer after asking for his power, Trinicus laments that no force in this time can possibly stop Dhaos, and uses his magic to send Cress and Mint back through time to seek out a means to do so while Chester stays behind to cover their escape. The two arrive one hundred years in the past to a time before Dhaos was initially sealed, where the villain is currently waging a war with his demon armies against the human kingdoms. Learning that only magic can harm him, they seek the aid of a young mage named Arche Klein, and summoner named Claus F. Lester, who accompany them to Dhaos's castle. After a fierce showdown, Dhaos escapes once again, and the party makes their way to an ancient city called Thor that houses a functional time machine to return to the future.

Arriving just moments after they first left, Cress and his companions join Chester in his fight against Dhaos and seemingly defeat him for good. They are approached by a traveler named Harrisson from 50 years in the future, however, who tells them that Dhaos is now ravaging the world in his time. Using the Thor machine once again, the team arrives in the new period where they meet a ninja named Suzu who accompanies them (except in the original release). After meeting with a group of elves, Cress obtains the legendary Eternal Sword, the only thing that can stop Dhaos from moving through time, and travel to his invisible fortress for the final confrontation. After finally defeating him, the party learns from a tree spirit named Martel that he is a visitor from a dying planet called Derris-Kharlan, whose world was slowly withering due to the death of its world tree, the source of all mana and lifeblood of everything in it. Attempting to obtain a seed from this planet's world tree, Yggdrasil, Dhaos instead found that its power was fading as well due to the humans' constant misuse of mana-based technology, and decided to wipe them out to save it. As the party members realize that by saving their world they have doomed his, Martel takes pity on their plight and sends a mana seed into space in an attempt to rejuvenate Derris-Kharlan's tree as Cress and his team return to their proper times.

== Development ==
Tales of Phantasia was developed by members of "Wolf Team", a studio originally created by Telenet Japan. The story was based on an unpublished Japanese novel called Tale Phantasia (テイルファンタジア, Teiru Fantajia), written by the game's total programmer Yoshiharu Gotanda. The world was primarily based around Norse mythology, science fiction elements were incorporated, and some names were taken from the works of Michael Moorcock and H. P. Lovecraft to accommodate fans of western fantasy fiction. Many changes were made to Gotanda's original story, including the title, character names, and the omission of several proposed scenarios. Due to poor experiences with their parent company, the team sought a different publisher for their title. After unsuccessfully pitching the project to Enix, they secured a publishing contract with Namco. The game includes voice clips during battles and certain story points as well as the opening theme song sequence, which necessitated the use of a high-capacity 48-megabit game cartridge. To help fit the voice acting into the game, the team used a sound system dubbed the Flexible Voice Drive, which enabled full recording of both the dialogue and theme song. The use of voice acting was a noted talking point leading up to the game's release. The redone character designs and artwork was handled by manga artist Kōsuke Fujishima. The Linear Motion Battle System, which would become a mainstay of the series, was inspired by fighting games, which had become popular at the time. During the later stages of development, there were internal conflicts, leading to a large number of development staff leaving Wolf Team and establishing independent development company tri-Ace.

=== Later versions ===
In August 1998, one month before the American release of the series' second main title, Tales of Destiny, Namco announced that it would also release a PlayStation version of Tales of Phantasia, which was made available in Japan the following December. The remake contains new features including an animated opening sequence produced by Japanese studio Production I.G., re-drawn character sprites and backgrounds, a 3D-rendered world map, and re-recorded character audio to better accommodate the compact disc format. Elements used in Destiny, such as the inclusion of animated Skits and a modified version of the battle system resembling that used in Destiny, were added. For the battle system, the team wanted to increase the overall battle speed and combo potential. Suzu Fujibayashi, a non-playable supporting character in the original release, was also made playable as an optional party member. Namco Hometek translation producer Aki Kozu explained that the company eventually passed on an English release due to "Timing and market demand", as well as the development team being too busy with Tales of Eternia to properly support a localization effort. The team also felt that "[Eternia] was going to be a much better game than [Phantasia] and had a better chance of succeeding in the US market".

In May 2002, Namco and Nintendo entered into a partnership that both allowed the two companies to cooperate on a new installment of the Star Fox franchise, Star Fox: Assault, and for Namco to develop several exclusive titles for Nintendo's GameCube and Game Boy Advance hardware. One such title, a Game Boy Advance version of Tales of Phantasia, was announced shortly after the deal signing for an originally expected release of December 2002. Namco first showcased the game in March 2003 with a revised release date set for the following June, and eventually received granted it a finalized release for August 2003, one month before Tales of Symphonia on the GameCube. The Game Boy Advance version was based on both preceding versions of the game, and included the Super Famicom release's original opening and two-dimensional world map, and the PlayStation remake's character voices, reduced enemy encounter rate and gameplay tweaks. An English-language version of Tales of Phantasia was announced for the first time in November 2005 by Nintendo Vice President of Sales and Marketing Reggie Fils-Aimé for release in North America and Europe in March 2006, with English voices, and the theme song being replaced with an original track, due to licensing issues.

In June 2006, Namco announced during a press conference that the game was being remade for the PlayStation Portable handheld as Tales of Phantasia Full Voice Edition (テイルズ オブ ファンタジア-フルボイスエディション-, Teiruzu Obu Fantajia -Furu Boisu Edishon-), and would be released the following September. The remake features all the previous features of the PlayStation and Game Boy Advance versions as well as voice-overs for all story text, the ability to walk in eight directions instead of four on map screens, and a new "Grade Shop" function seen in later games in the series. It made an appearance at 2006 Tokyo Game Show alongside other Namco Bandai titles shortly after release.

In March 2010, Namco Bandai announced that its upcoming PlayStation Portable role-playing game Tales of Phantasia: Narikiri Dungeon X would include another remake of Tales of Phantasia called Tales of Phantasia X (テイルズ オブ ファンタジアX, Teiruzu Obu Fantajia X; Pronounced "Tales of Phantasia Cross") as a bonus title. The new version features a faster, more streamlined battle system where casting magic spells no longer temporarily pauses the action on screen, allowing more attacks to occur simultaneously.

A cellphone port of Game Boy Advance version was released in Japan in 2010. The iOS version was released in 2013. The version is free-to-play, but is different from other versions in removing some save points and relying heavily on an in-app purchase system, with the English version using an orchestrated piece, much like the GBA version, due to licensing issues, as well as the Japanese voices being retained. On May 29, 2014, the Japanese iOS version was discontinued after which the game cannot be started or played. The English version of the game was discontinued on August 28, 2014.

== Related media ==
=== Audio ===
The music of Tales of Phantasia was composed by Motoi Sakuraba, Shinji Tamura, and Ryota Furuya, with the PlayStation release also featuring songs from other Namco titles such as Rally-X, written by Nobuyuki Ohnogi, and Ridge Racer by Shinji Hosoe. It features the opening theme song "Yume wa Owaranai" (夢は終わらない, lit. 'The Dream Will Not End'), performed by Yukari Yoshida in the Super Famicom and Japanese Game Boy Advance versions and YO-MI in the PlayStation, PlayStation Portable and Japanese iOS versions. Yoshida would also perform the PlayStation version's ending theme, "Hoshi o Sora ni" (星を空に, lit. 'The Star in the Sky'). Namco would replace the opening theme in the English Game Boy Advance release with an original instrumental piece.

Although the original Super Famicom version did not receive a commercial soundtrack at the time of its release, an official album for the PlayStation remake was made available in May 1999 by Victor Entertainment, and features 77 songs across two discs. A number of radio drama albums were also produced, beginning with a three-volume set called Drama CD Tales of Phantasia (ドラマCD 「テイルズ オブ ファンタジア」, Dorama CD `Teiruzu Obu Fantajia') by Movic released between May and July 1999. A two-volume set called Drama CD Tales of Phantasia ~Anthology~ (ドラマCD 【テイルズ オブ ファンタジア】 アンソロジー, Dorama CD `Teiruzu Obu Fantajia' Ansorojī) was released the following year between January and March 2000, as well as a stand-alone album called Tales of Phantasia Chara Talk CD ~Panic-World~ (テイルズ オブ ファンタジア キャラトークCD ～パニックワールド～, Teiruzu Obu Fantajia Kyaratōku CD ~Panikkuwārudo~) released in December 2001.

=== Books and manga ===
Famitsu Bunko published a series of related novels written by Sara Yajima in 1999 and 2000. The series contains seven books: the two-volume Harukanaru Jikū (はるかなる時空; lit. 'Far away Space-Time'), Shinku no Hitomi (真紅の瞳, lit. 'Crimson Eyes'), Konpeki no Kizuna (紺碧の絆; lit. 'The Azure Bonds'), Kohaku no Kairō (琥珀の回廊; lit. 'Amber Corridor'), and Ruri no Yume (瑠璃の夢; lit. 'The Ruri Dream'). Other books contains: the novel Tales of Phantasia: The Untold History (テイルズオブファンタジア: 語られざる歴史), written by Ryouji Matsuri and published by Dengeki Bunko in 1999; and Tales of Phantasia: Maken Ninpou Jou (テイルズオブファンタジア: 魔剣忍法帖) written by Ryūnosuke Kingetsu, which published by Movic in 2000.

A manga adaptation of the game, simply titled Tales of Phantasia, was serialized in the Kadokawa Shoten's magazine Tales of Magazine, starting in its first issue on 7 August 2008, marking the first manga adaptation of the game in the twelve years following the game's release. It was released as compiled Tankōbon in 2009.

Each version of the game was accompanied by the release of an official game guide, along with several illustration books.

=== OVA ===
- Tales of Phantasia
- Original video animation

Tales of Phantasia: The Animation
- Directed by: Takuo Tominaga (#1–3); Shinjirō Mogi (#4)
- Produced by: Makoto Nakamura
- Written by: Ryunosuke Kingetsu
- Music by: Kimio Nomura
- Studio: Actas
- Licensed by: NA: Discotek Media
- Released: November 24, 2004 – February 26, 2006
- Runtime: 28–30 minutes (each)
- Episodes: 4

Tales of Phantasia: The Animation is an adapted OVA of the game. The anime contained four 30-minute episodes. It was released in Japan from November 2004 to February 2006 and distributed by Geneon in America in January 2007. CVs were shared with the same of the games. It was animated by Actas, and directed by Takuo Tominaga (episodes 1-3) and Shinjiro Mogi (episode 4).

The plot of the OVA is generally based on the game's plot, but there are details in the anime that are not in the game, namely, additional scenes and dialogue. The episodes themselves focus on the party's encounters with Dhaos and the scenes involving the Tree of Life and the Elves, omitting a great portion of the story told in the original game.

The opening theme "Yume no Hate" (夢の果て; "The Ends of a Dream") and ending theme "Priere" both were composed by Mika Watanabe & Ikuko Noguchi, lyrics by tomo and performed by Masami Suzuki.

Some related products of the OVA were released in Japan. In 2005, Frontier Works released an original Tales of Phantasia: The Animation Original Soundtrack, it contains 49 tracks and span 73min 15s. The company then released a series of drama CDs in 2006; it contain six CDs each featuring one of the playable characters of the game. Ichijinsha also released the book "Tales of Phantasia: The Animation The Animation Art Graphy" in 2006, which features illustrations of the anime character designer, special talking between voice actors of Cress and Mint, along with an interview of the game character designer Kōsuke Fujishima.

=== Sequel ===
A sequel, Tales of Phantasia: Narikiri Dungeon, was released for the Game Boy Color on November 10, 2000. It was the first game in the Narikiri Dungeon series. A remake of the sequel, Tales of Phantasia: Narikiri Dungeon X, was released on August 5, 2010, for the PlayStation Portable.

== Reception ==
Reception

Aggregate scores
Aggregator	Score			
Aggregator	GBA	iOS	PS	SNES
GameRankings	73%	N/A	N/A	N/A
Metacritic	76/100	35/100	N/A	N/A

Review scores
Publication	Score			
Publication	GBA	iOS	PS	SNES
Electronic Gaming Monthly	7/10	N/A	N/A	N/A
Eurogamer	6/10	N/A	N/A	N/A
Famitsu	28/40	N/A	29/40	30/40
Game Informer	7.3/10	N/A	N/A	N/A
GameFan	N/A	N/A	N/A	258/300
GameSpot	7.2/10	N/A	N/A	N/A
IGN	7.5/10	N/A	N/A	N/A
RPGFan	77%	N/A	90%	97%
TouchArcade	N/A	1/5	N/A	N/A
Cubed3	N/A	N/A	N/A	9/10

The original Super Famicom release of Tales of Phantasia received a 30 out of 40 total score from Japanese Weekly Famitsu magazine based on individual review scores of 8, 7, 6, and 9. Readers of the magazine would later declare the game to be their favorite Namco title of all time in an August 2003 poll. GameFan's panel of three reviewers scored it 90, 86 and 82 out of 100, with one of the reviewers concluding that it "is the best RPG I've ever played in Japanese on the Super Famicom".

Sales of the title were slow during its debut month, which series producer Makoto Yoshidzumi attributed to being released at nearly the same time as Enix's popular Dragon Quest VI, and would sell a total of 212,000 copies in the region. While the PlayStation remake scored slightly lower in Famitsu in 1998, it ended up being far more commercially successful by selling around 769,000 copies in Japan. The 2006 PlayStation Portable Full Voice version sold around 136,000 copies. The iOS free-to-play version was downloaded at least 150,000 times in its first 5 days.

=== Game Boy Advance version ===
The Game Boy Advance release marked the first official English-language appearance of Tales of Phantasia, which was met with mostly positive reception in the West, earning a 73% average from GameRankings and 76 out of 100 rating from Metacritic. While websites such as GameSpot felt that the game distinguished itself from other role-playing titles with its action-based combat system, it also overly relied on too many random battles to "drag down the pacing and pad out the playing time". IGN commented that the battle system was unrefined when compared to later games in the series such as Tales of Symphonia on the GameCube, but that the graphic and audio quality held up "relatively well" eleven years after its original release. The site would also call the story and characters "amazing", but that its dated design would only appeal to players familiar with older games in the genre, calling it a "love/hate" experience. Editors of Electronic Gaming Monthly similarly remarked that "fans of traditional RPGs will appreciate its long, varied dungeons and action-packed, real-time battles," and that it "still has an awful lot of charm for such an old game". Eurogamer expressed that the title's late release near the end of the handheld's life hurt it when compared to similar ports on Sony's PlayStation Portable, and that the game's "messy" interface and "rough around the edges" localization paled in comparison to the Super Famicom's unofficial fan translation.

The game would go on to sell approximately 314,000 copies worldwide by December 2007. In December 2012, Game Informer named Chester one of the best characters in the Tales series due to his struggle throughout the story to come to terms with the death of his sister, stating that "The whole process builds slowly, but it's done in such a natural way that it makes Chester's transformation believable."

=== iOS version ===
The iOS version, however, was panned by critics, garnering a 35 out of 100 rating from Metacritic. Pocket Gamer gave the game a 4/10, calling it "A port with potential ruined by obtrusively implemented IAPs". TouchArcade gave the game 1 star out of 5, criticizing the heavy use of In-App Purchases as well as how some of the save points (mainly the ones near bosses) have been disabled. Digital Spy gave the game a rating of 2 out of 5, criticizing the overly sensitive and unresponsive controls and how the game auto-saves in the middle of a fight.
