= Tales of Phantasia: Narikiri Dungeon =

2000 video game

- Developer: Wolfteam
- Publisher: Namco
- Director: Kenichi Suzuki
- Producers: Shigeru Yokoyama; Shinichiro Okamoto
- Designer: Kosuke Fujishima
- Writer: Noshin Shinmen
- Composers: Shinji Tamura; Motoi Sakuraba; Toshiki Aida
- Series: Tales
- Platform: Game Boy Color
- Release: JP: November 10, 2000
- Genre: Role-playing video game
- Mode: Single-player

Tales of Phantasia: Narikiri Dungeon (テイルズ オブ ファンタジア なりきりダンジョン, Teiruzu Obu Fantajia Narikiri Danjon) is a role-playing video game for the Game Boy Color released by Namco on November 10, 2000, selling 136,000 copies. Tales of Phantasia: Narikiri Dungeon's characteristic genre name is Dungeon RPG (ダンジョンRPG, Danjon RPG). It is the third main title and the first sequel in the Tales series, which normally does not have connected storylines. The story begins 205 years after the beginning of Tales of Phantasia.

Due to the limits of the Game Boy, the game uses a battle system called Petit LMBS, a turn-based variation on the Linear Motion Battle System used by the rest of the series. As in normal LMBS, the player controls only one character and does so via button combinations instead of a dialog choice, while party members are computer-controlled. A remake of the game was later released on PlayStation Portable called Tales of Phantasia: Narikiri Dungeon X.

== About the name ==
Attempts to convert the title into full English are difficult because narikiri (成り切り) has no convenient English substitute. Its meaning is the act of becoming [something else] completely, similar to the definition for the word "metamorphosis". Its use in the title is a reference to Mel and Dio's ability to become anything they can dress up as.

== Storyline ==
The story begins when what appears to be a shooting star lands in the mountains. The narrator describes the player (referred to in second person) finding a pair of twin babies in the light and becoming their adoptive parent. By default, the boy is named Dio (ディオ), and the girl is named Mel (メル).

The story skips ahead thirteen years to 4408 by the Aselia Calendar (the narration notes that Dio is energetic, Mel is level-headed, and both of them are mysteriously powerful). Dio enters with a strange creature that followed him home from the mountains. He and Mel decide to keep it as a pet and name it Kruelle (クルール) based on the sound it makes ("krr"). Kruelle begins as a green bipedal creature who is roughly waist-high, but it is actually a shape-shifter whose forms change based on its power and mood.

Mel and Dio start to go about their day as normal when they are suddenly visited by a winged woman who introduces herself as Norn and says that the two of them have a doomed destiny. With little else in the way of explanation, she sends them to meet Arche, the only surviving time warrior made famous by the events in Tales of Phantasia.

Arche, whose age of 223 years is possible only because she is a half-Elf, now lives in a pink heart-adorned tower which Mel and Dio must climb. When they arrive at the top, Norn startles Arche by appearing and requests Arche's assistance in preparing a trial that will test the strength of Mel and Dio's hearts and bodies.

After proving themselves in combat against Arche, Mel and Dio return to their house, where Norn enchants a painting of the sun to work as a time portal to the year 4203. Mel and Dio are sent to Euclid to speak with Claus so that he will tell them about the war with Dhaos that happened in Tales of Phantasia. He gives the popular version of the story, reminds them that history is biased, and then tells them what really happened: Dhaos waged war against users of magitechnology because they were foolishly depleting the world's Mana supply. Mel and Dio also gain words of wisdom from the spirits Sylph, Undine, Efreet, and Gnome after defeating them in combat.

Norn enchants their painting of a moon to allow them to travel to 4306, so that they can meet Chester, Cress, and Mint. At Norn's request, Chester tells them why he now runs an orphanage, which is because such disadvantaged children may turn to an immoral lifestyle and wrongly attempt to justify their actions by blaming others. He says he doesn't want anymore children to be like that and, getting emotional, accidentally mentions that he used to be such a child himself. He gives them directions to Maxwell since Cress isn't around at the time.

After another test of combat, Maxwell gives Mel and Dio a lecture in the concepts of time and space. He says that possibilities create parallel worlds, and going back in time to do something differently from how it was supposed to happen will just cause a person to end up in a different parallel world. Thus, it is impossible to change history.

They finally meet Cress, who relates the shock he felt at learning the truth behind Dhaos's motives. He says he does not regret his actions in opposing Dhaos but regrets that he had only been able to see from his own point of view, not realizing until it was too late that, from Dhaos's people's perspective, he was the destroyer of their last hope. After that, they meet Mint, who rejects being called a great healer by Norn because she can heal people's bodies but not their hearts. She tells Mel and Dio that living for others, even just one person, brings happiness. They fight with Gremlin Lair, who tells them good and evil are two halves of the same thing and cannot be separated, and Aska, who tells them to believe in their own potential. They can only continue their quest and meet Luna by helping others a few times. When they get home, a mysterious figure temporarily appears to tell them its foolish to reject evil because being human means being evil; to stop being evil is to stop being human.

Norn converts a painting of a star into a portal to 4354 so that they can meet Suzu and later asks Suzu to tell Mel and Dio what she gained by meeting Cress and the others. Suzu says that she was a child in both body and heart back then and learned that meeting and separating from various people was what it meant to become an adult. As Mel and Dio start to leave, Suzu stops them to question Kruelle about its motive. She then realizes that Kruelle must have a reason for its actions and agrees to stop asking. Kruelle spends this conversation mewing in confusion.

Mel and Dio are tested in combat by Volt and Shadow, the latter of which tells them about the balance between light and darkness. The mysterious figure appears again to tell them light and dark cannot be separated and that stifling one's own evil will cause one to have a twisted heart. Mel and Dio go on to be tested by Origin and Pluto. The mysterious figure appears again to tell them that everything is meaningless.

Norn congratulates them on completing the spirits' trial and warps them to 4506, where Arche congratulates them as well. A few days later, Norn asks them if they understand why they exist. They say no, and there's an earthquake as Norn opens a cave to the north. Going to the cave, Mel and Dio are accompanied by aggressive copies of themselves who claim to be their "true selves". Norn says there's no such thing as a true self and sends the first Mel and Dio to the land of the dead via a painting of a cloud.

While there, they are tested in combat by FenBeast (Fenrir Beast), Flambelk (Flamberge), Jestorna, Ishlant, Big Eye, and finally Dhaos to learn the truth about their past:

They were Meltia and Dios Bundy, citizens of a country on Derris-Kharlan called Palace Gudra (パレスグドラ1), which was at war with another small country. When they were 27, Meltia was a scientist in charge of creating a magitechnology (magic science, MysTek) weapon. She brushes aside the moral implications of creating such a powerful weapon of mass destruction because she feels that the search for knowledge is more important than anything else. Meanwhile, Dios is a soldier. He reports to their adoptive father General Bundy that their country is losing, and delivers a message from Dhaos, the leader of another country, warning them to stop the war because of all the innocent people dying. The general insists on ignoring the message, and when Dios reminds him of the great power Dhaos's country has, the general forces his obedience by reminding him that he would have died had not the general adopted him, saying he has a duty to give his life for his country.

As Dios predicted, the enemy country defeats Palace Gudra. After receiving his final order from the dying general, Dios runs to Meltia's lab. Meltia is wounded and dies shortly after he arrives. Dios goes to the computer and discovers that the magitechnology weapon is still functional. In compliance with the general's last order, he fires it at the enemy. The firing immediately kills 150,000 people and dooms the rest of the planet by devastating the mana supply. Norn appears to Dios and says that she is the guardian of the dying Kharlan Tree. She decides to resurrect Dios and Meltia as babies and send them to another planet so that she can judge whether or not they are inherently evil. If it turns out they are evil, she'll kill them.

Elsewhere, Dhaos, who had previously been relieved that the war ended without his country using force, now realizes that the Kharlan Tree is dying. He decides to travel to another planet in search of a mana seed of another Kharlan Tree. Later he finds Yggdrasill, the tree on Tales of Phantasia world, but realizes that magitechnology is depleting this planet's mana as well. He is shocked to experience an inner voice telling him to kill the offenders and acknowledges that as his hidden voice of evil.

Back in the present, Mel and Dio are able to continue through the cave in which they met their alternate selves. They see scenes of the Tales of Phantasia heroes suffering with their problems while their alternate selves comment. Chester is reminiscing about his dead sister Ami, and Meltia wonders whether he runs an orphanage for others' sake or for his own sake. Claus is worried about becoming too much like his own father, whom he hated for being too involved in research to spend time with family, and Milard comforts him. Dios notes the similarities between love and hate, but asks who those without parents are supposed to emulate. Arche, who has a long life span, misses all her human friends, especially Chester, and Dios says that separation is too painful, so one might as well never become attached to someone anyway. Suzu is shown being forced to kill her parents, and Meltia says no one understands the darkness in Suzu's heart, perhaps not even Suzu herself. Cress is giving his support (and love) to Mint, who is recovering from illness, and Dios criticizes her because she is needed by many people and doesn't understand what it means to be unloved.

Near the end of the cave, Mel and Dio fight Meltia and Dios, who remind them that this violates the principles of cause and effect and creates a paradox because they've killed their past selves. They become one with their dark sides again.

Finally, Kruelle walks out in front of them and reveals that it has been Norn the whole time. As their final test, Mel and Dio must defeat Norn in battle. After they win, Norn says that the flow of time will correct them. They are once again reborn and their adoptive parent (the player) finds them as babies again.
