= Freedom of Mobile Multimedia Access =

Mobile network in Japan

Freedom of Mobile Multimedia Access (FOMA) is the brand name of the W-CDMA-based 3G telecommunications services being offered by the Japanese telecommunications service provider NTT DoCoMo. It is an implementation of the Universal Mobile Telecommunications System (UMTS) and was the world's first 3G mobile data service to commence commercial operations.

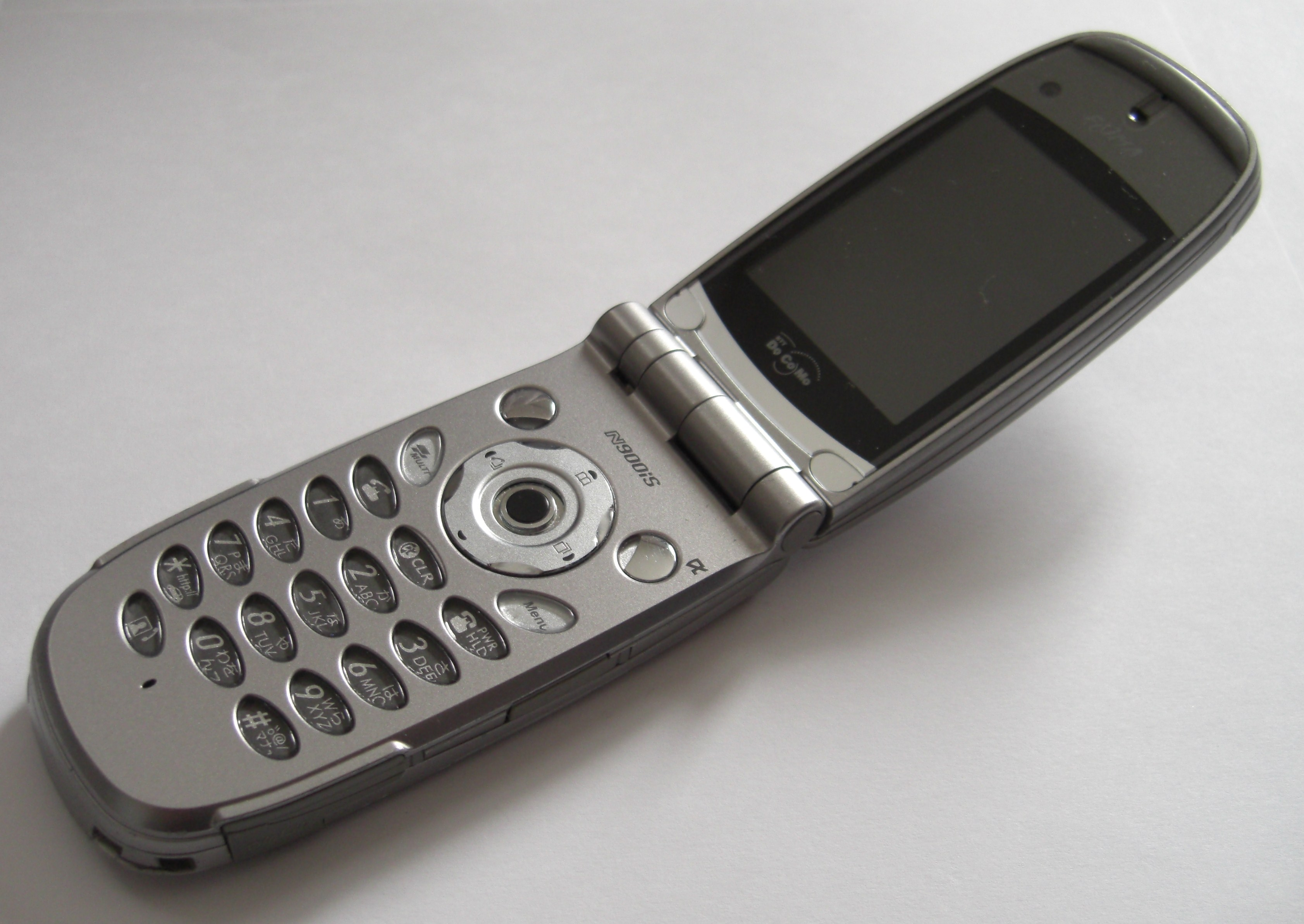
A typical FOMA phone

NTT DoCoMo also offers HSPA services branded FOMA High-Speed (FOMAハイスピード), which offers downlink speeds up to 7.2 Mbit/s and uplink speeds up to 5.7 Mbit/s.

== History ==
The W-CDMA air interface was accepted by the ITU as one of several air interfaces for the IMT-2000telecom initiative and by the ETSI as one of three air interfaces for the UMTS cellular network standard.

NTT DoCoMo originally planned to launch the world's first 3G services, initially branded Frontier of Mobile Multimedia Access (FOMA), in May 2001. However, by May 2001, NTT DoCoMo had postponed the full-scale launch until October 2001, claiming they had not completed testing of their entire infrastructure, and would only launch an introductory trial to 4,000 subscribers. In doing so, they also renamed the service to Freedom of Mobile multimedia Access. In June 2001 trial subscribers complained the mobile phones had insufficient battery life and crashed frequently, that there was inadequate network coverage, and that there were security issues within the handset itself. As a result, DoCoMo recalled 1,500 handsets by the end of June 2001. FOMA successfully launched in October 2001, providing mobile telecommunications coverage to Tokyo and Yokohama.

Initially - as the first full-scale 3G service in the world - The first FOMA handsets were of an experimental nature, targeting early adopters, were larger than previous handsets, had poor battery life, while the initial network only covered the center of Japan's largest towns and cities. For the first 1–2 years, FOMA was essentially an experimental service for early adopters - mainly centered around communication industry professionals.

As NTT DoCoMo did not wait for the completion and finalization of the 3G Release 99 network specification, their 3G W-CDMA network was initially incompatible with the internationally deployed UMTS standard. However, in 2004 NTT DoCoMo performed wide-scale upgrades on its network, bringing it into compliance with the specification and enabling 100% compatibility with UMTS handsets, including incoming and outgoing roaming.

Around March 2004, the FOMA network achieved mass adoption, and handset sales soared. As of September 29, 2007, FOMA had over 40 million subscribers.

== Terminals ==
NTT DoCoMo offers a wide range of FOMA branded handsets, which are made specifically for the Japanese market. FOMA handsets differ from Western UMTS handsets in several aspects, for example:

- A standardized menu structure and chargers.
- Japan-specific features such as i-mode or Osaifu-Keitai (electronic wallet).
- Multiband-support, which includes band VI at 800 MHz for FOMA Plus-Area (newer models).
- No support for dual-mode operation with GSM/EDGE (except some models branded by DoCoMo as World Wing).

== Frequency allocations ==
In metropolitan areas, FOMA uses the UMTS band I around 2100 MHz, which has been originally assigned to IMT-2000 services worldwide, except in the Americas. In order to improve coverage in rural and mountainous areas, NTT DoCoMo also offers FOMA services in the 800 MHz band originally assigned to the 2G PDC mova service, which corresponds to UMTS band VI and is similar to band V used in the United States. These extended service areas are branded FOMA Plus-Area (FOMAプラスエリア) and require multiband terminals.
